= 2014–15 Málaga CF season =

Málaga CF
2014–15 season
- President: Abdullah Al Thani
- Manager: Javi Gracia
- Stadium: La Rosaleda
- La Liga: 9th
- Copa del Rey: Quarter-finals
- Top goalscorer: League: Juanmi (8); All: Juanmi (8)
Home colours	Away colours	Third colours

The 2014–15 season is the 83rd season in Málaga CF history and its 34th in the top-tier.

== Squad and statistics ==
Updated as of 30 May 2015.

No.	Pos	Nat	Player	Total		La Liga		Copa del Rey	
No.	Pos	Nat	Player	Apps	Goals	Apps	Goals	Apps	Goals
1	GK	(Cameroon) CMR	Carlos Kameni	38	0	38	0	0	0
2	MF	(Morocco) MAR	Nordin Amrabat	35	6	20+11	6	2+2	0
3	DF	(Brazil) BRA	Weligton	35	0	32	0	3	0
4	DF	(Portugal) POR	Flávio Ferreira	0	0	0	0	0	0
5	DF	(Portugal) POR	Vitorino Antunes	16	1	15	1	1	0
6	MF	(Spain) ESP	Ignacio Camacho	28	4	25	2	3	2
7	FW	(Spain) ESP	Samu	38	5	27+5	5	5+1	0
9	FW	(Spain) ESP	Javi Guerra	14	5	7+6	5	1	0
10	MF	(Portugal) POR	Ricardo Horta	37	3	16+15	1	6	2
11	FW	(Spain) ESP	Juanmi	38	8	26+8	8	4	0
12	MF	(Argentina) ARG	Fernando Tissone	8	0	3+4	0	0+1	0
13	GK	(Mexico) MEX	Guillermo Ochoa	6	0	0	0	6	0
14	MF	(Spain) ESP	Recio	36	3	15+15	1	5+1	2
15	DF	(Argentina) ARG	Marcos Angeleri	28	0	21+1	0	6	0
16	FW	(Argentina) ARG	Ezequiel Rescaldani	2	0	0+1	0	1	0
17	MF	(Portugal) POR	Duda	26	1	9+16	1	0+1	0
18	DF	(Venezuela) VEN	Roberto Rosales	40	0	34	0	6	0
19	DF	(Ivory Coast) CIV	Arthur Boka	26	0	18+5	0	3	0
21	DF	(Spain) ESP	Sergio Sánchez	21	0	19+2	0	0	0
22	FW	(Spain) ESP	Luis Alberto	20	2	6+9	2	3+2	0
23	DF	(Spain) ESP	Miguel Torres	19	0	13+3	0	3	0
27	GK	(Argentina) ARG	Agustín Cousillas	0	0	0	0	0	0
28	MF	(Venezuela) VEN	Juanpi	10	1	2+3	0	5	1
29	FW	(Spain) ESP	Samu Castillejo	39	1	28+6	1	0+5	0
30	MF	(Spain) ESP	Sergi Darder	36	4	33+1	4	0+2	0
—	DF	(Panama) PAN	Roberto Chen	0	0	0	0	-	-
Players who have made an appearance or had a squad number this season but have been loaned out or transferred
8	MF	(Spain) ESP	Francisco Portillo	2	0	0	0	0+2	0
9	FW	(Paraguay) PAR	Roque Santa Cruz	13	5	11+1	3	1	2
20	DF	(Spain) ESP	José Manuel Casado	2	0	0	0	2	0
—	MF	(Argentina) ARG	Pablo Pérez	0	0	0	0	0	0

== Competitions ==
=== Overall ===
Competition	Started round	Final position / round	First match	Last match
La Liga	Matchday 1	9th	August 2014	May 2015
Copa del Rey	Round of 32	Quarter-finals	3 December 2014	29 January 2015

Updated to match played June 2014
Source: Competitions

=== La Liga ===
==== League table ====
Pos	Team	Pld	W	D	L	GF	GA	GD	Pts	Qualification or relegation
7	Athletic Bilbao	38	15	10	13	42	41	+1	55	Qualification for the Europa League third qualifying round (Note: Since the winners of the 2014–15 Copa del Rey, Barcelona, qualified for European competition based on league position, the spot awarded to the cup winners (Europa League group stage) was passed to the sixth-placed team, and the spot awarded to the sixth-placed team (Europa League third qualifying round) was passed to the seventh-placed team.)
8	Celta Vigo	38	13	12	13	47	44	+3	51	
9	Málaga	38	14	8	16	42	48	−6	50	
10	Espanyol	38	13	10	15	47	51	−4	49 (Note: Espanyol ahead on head-to-head record; Rayo Vallecano–Espanyol 1–3, Espanyol–Rayo Vallecano 1–1.)	
11	Rayo Vallecano	38	15	4	19	46	68	−22	49	

Source: La Liga
Rules for classification: 1) points; 2) head-to-head points; 3) head-to-head goal difference; 4) goal difference; 5) number of goals scored; 6) fair-play points; 7) playoff match

==== Results by round ====
Round	1	2	3	4	5	6	7	8	9	10	11	12	13	14	15	16	17	18	19	20	21	22	23	24	25	26	27	28	29	30	31	32	33	34	35	36	37	38
Ground	H	A	H	A	H	A	H	A	H	A	H	A	H	A	H	A	H	H	A	A	H	A	H	A	H	A	H	A	H	A	H	A	H	A	H	A	A	H
Result	W	L	D	D	D	L	W	W	W	W	W	L	L	W	W	W	L	D	L	D	W	L	L	W	W	L	W	L	D	L	D	L	D	L	L	W	L	L
Position	6	13	11	11	10	13	11	8	7	7	6	6	7	7	7	7	7	7	7	7	7	7	7	7	7	7	7	7	7	7	7	7	7	7	8	7	8	9

A = Away; H = Home; W = Win; D = Draw; L = Loss

==== Matches ====
Kickoff times are in CET. Win Draw Loss

23 August 2014 1	Málaga	1–0	Athletic Bilbao	Málaga
19:00 CEST (UTC+02:00)	Luis Alberto 35'; Camacho (yellow card) 67'; Duda (red card) 88'; Samu (yellow card) 88'; Antunes (red card) 90+2'; Horta (yellow card) 90+4'	Report	Iraizoz (yellow card) 35'; Gurpegui (yellow card) 39'; Laporte (yellow card) 69'	Stadium: La Rosaleda; Attendance: 24,500; Referee: Antonio Mateu Lahoz

29 August 2014 2	Valencia	3–0	Málaga	Valencia
22:00 CEST (UTC+02:00)	Gomes (yellow card) 5'; Alcácer 31'; Parejo 45'; Piatti 56'	Report	Darder (red card) 27'; Weligton (yellow card) 45'; Rosales (yellow card) 45'	Stadium: Mestalla; Attendance: 41,550; Referee: Xavier Estrada Fernández

13 September 2014 3	Málaga	0–0	Levante	Málaga
18:00 CEST (UTC+02:00)	Recio (yellow card) 68'	Report	Martins (yellow card) 50'; Vyntra (yellow card) 72'	Stadium: La Rosaleda; Attendance: 19,710; Referee: Alfonso Álvarez Izquierdo

20 September 2014 4	Espanyol	2–2	Málaga	Cornellà de Llobregat
20:00 CEST (UTC+02:00)	Caicedo 16'; J. López (yellow card) 39'; Stuani 88', (yellow card) 90+1'; Sevilla (yellow card) 90+3'	Report	Camacho 53', (yellow card) 70'; Sánchez (yellow card) 60'; Darder (yellow card) 75'; Duda (yellow card) 89', (goal) 90+3'; Kameni (yellow card) 89'	Stadium: Cornellà-El Prat; Attendance: 12,600; Referee: Ignacio Villanueva Iglesias

24 September 2014 5	Málaga	0–0	Barcelona	Málaga
22:00 CEST (UTC+02:00)	Rosales (yellow card) 73'; Weligton (yellow card) 83'	Report	Douglas (yellow card) 70'; Piqué (yellow card) 83'	Stadium: La Rosaleda; Attendance: 24,821; Referee: Alejandro Hernández Hernández

28 September 2014 6	Getafe	1–0	Málaga	Getafe
12:00 CEST (UTC+02:00)	Míchel 25'		Camacho (yellow card) 29'; Darder (yellow card) 64'; Weligton (yellow card) 87' (yellow-red card) 90+2'; Rosales (yellow card) 90'	Stadium: Coliseum Alfonso Pérez; Attendance: 5,500; Referee: Eduardo Prieto Iglesias

4 October 2014 7	Málaga	2–1	Granada	Málaga
22:00 CEST (UTC+02:00)	Amrabat (yellow card) 15'; Santa Cruz 60'; Angeleri (red card) 48'; Antunes 80'	Report	El-Arabi 1'; Piti (yellow card) 19'; Iturra (yellow card) 21'	Stadium: La Rosaleda; Attendance: 19,000

18 October 2014 8	Córdoba	1–2	Málaga	Córdoba
22:00 CEST (UTC+02:00)	Juan Carlos (yellow card) 30'; Luso (yellow card) 60'; Ghilas 90+4'	Report	Samu 22'; Amrabat 31' (pen.); Castillejo (yellow card) 41'; Recio (yellow card) 73'; Sánchez (yellow card) 90'	Stadium: Arcángel; Attendance: 17,000; Referee: José González González

26 October 2014 9	Málaga	4–0	Rayo Vallecano	Málaga
12:00 CEST (UTC+02:00)	Samu 6'; Rosales (yellow card) 13'; Sergi 21'; Juanmi 45'; Amrabat 49' (pen.)	Report	Baptistão (yellow card) 28'; Baena (yellow card) 37'; Tito (yellow card) 41'; Amaya (yellow card) 48'	Stadium: La Rosaleda; Attendance: 21,800; Referee: Alfonso Álvarezd Izquierdo

1 November 2014 10	Real Sociedad	0–1	Málaga	San Sebastián
22:00 CET (UTC+01:00)	Berchiche (yellow card) 34'; Zurutuza (yellow card) 45'	Report	Samu (yellow card) 38'; Darder (yellow card) 43'; Weligton (yellow card) 56'; Amrabat (yellow card) 63'; Juanmi 72'; Recio (yellow card) 85'	Stadium: Anoeta; Attendance: 21,086; Referee: Santiago Jaime Latre

8 November 2014 11	Málaga	2–1	Eibar	Málaga
22:00 CEST (UTC+01:00)	Boka (yellow card) 37'; Juanmi 53'; Horta (yellow card) 72'; Camacho (yellow card) 89'; Amrabat 89' (pen.)	Report	Lillo (yellow card) 26'; Arruabarrena 42'; Navas (yellow card) 67' (yellow-red card) 88'; Albentosa (yellow card) 89'	Stadium: La Rosaleda; Attendance: 22,600; Referee: Juan Martínez Munuera

22 November 2014 12	Atlético Madrid	3–1	Málaga	Madrid
16:00 CEST (UTC+01:00)	Tiago 12'; Griezmann 42', (yellow card) 48'; Gabi (yellow card) 53' (yellow-red card) 88'; Godín 83'	Report	Samu (yellow card) 47' (yellow-red card) 73'; Camacho (yellow card) 50'; Torres (yellow card) 58'; Santa Cruz 63'; Sánchez (yellow card) 71'	Stadium: Vicente Calderón; Attendance: 44,200; Referee: Fernando Teixeira Vitienes

29 November 2014 13	Málaga	1–2	Real Madrid	Málaga
20:00 CEST (UTC+01:00)	Darder (yellow card) 30'; Santa Cruz 90+2'; Weligton (yellow card) 90+4'	Report	Benzema 18'; Kroos (yellow card) 43'; Isco (yellow card) 71' (yellow-red card) 86'; Marcelo (yellow card) 80'; Bale 83'	Stadium: La Rosaleda; Attendance: 29,025; Referee: Iñaki Vicandi Garrido

6 December 2014 14	Deportivo La Coruña	0–1	Málaga	A Coruña
22:00 CEST (UTC+01:00)	Luisinho (yellow card) 60'; Sidnei (yellow card) 61'; Cuenca (yellow card) 73'; Toché (yellow card) 86'	Report	Kameni (yellow card) 11'; Darder 21'; Antunes (yellow card) 24'; Samu (yellow card) 50'	Stadium: Riazor; Attendance: 19,000; Referee: Jesús Gil Manzano

13 December 2014 15	Málaga	1–0	Celta Vigo	Málaga
22:00 CEST (UTC+01:00)	Samu 21', (yellow card) 90'; Rosales (yellow card) 24'; Weligton (yellow card) 47'; Camacho (yellow card) 52'; Recio (yellow card) 86'	Report	Fontàs (yellow card) 30'; Charles (yellow card) 42'; Mallo (yellow card) 55'; Fernández (yellow card) 64'	Stadium: La Rosaleda; Attendance: 27,000; Referee: Carlos del Cerro Grande

21 December 2014 16	Elche	1–2	Málaga	Elche
19:00 CEST (UTC+01:00)	Albácar (yellow card) 19'; Adrián (yellow card) 30'; Lombán 45+1'; Cisma (yellow card) 78'	Report	Castillejo (yellow card) 12'; Camacho (yellow card) 45+2', (goal) 49'; Luis Alberto 77'; Amrabat (yellow card) 78'	Stadium: Martínez Valero; Referee: Alberto Undiano Mallenco

3 January 2015 17	Málaga	1–2	Almería	Málaga
22:00 CEST (UTC+01:00)	Rosales (yellow card) 28'; Rescaldani (yellow card) 69'; Samu 73'; Torres (yellow card) 75'; Luis Alberto (yellow card) 90+5'	Report	Hemed (yellow card) 26', (goal) 39', 76' (pen.); Verza (yellow card) 30'; Navarro (yellow card) 70'; Michel (yellow card) 86' (yellow-red card) 90+3'; Julián (yellow card) 90+2'	Stadium: La Rosaleda; Attendance: 19,500; Referee: Fernando Teixeira Vitienes

10 January 2015 18	Málaga	1–1	Villarreal	Málaga
18:00 CEST (UTC+01:00)	Samu (yellow card) 50'; Angeleri (yellow card) 55'; Duda (yellow card) 59'; Amrabat 60'; Torres (yellow card) 71'	Report	Cheryshev (yellow card) 10'; Ruiz (yellow card) 29'; Trigueros (yellow card) 36'; J. Dos Santos 45+1'; Gabriel (yellow card) 84'	Stadium: La Rosaleda; Attendance: 23,500; Referee: Santiago Jaime Latre

18 January 2015 19	Sevilla	2–0	Málaga	Sevilla
21:00	Krychowiak (yellow card) 8'; Reyes (yellow card) 18'; Bacca 36'; Suárez 68'; Beto (yellow card) 81'	Report	Recio	Stadium: Ramón Sánchez Pizjuán; Attendance: 24,000; Referee: José Antonio Teixeira Vitienes

25 January 2015 20	Athletic Bilbao	1–1	Málaga	Bilbao
17:00 CEST (UTC+01:00)	San José 70'	Report	Camacho (yellow card) 9'; Guerra 78'	Stadium: San Mamés; Attendance: 41,200; Referee: Alfonso Álvarez Izquierdo

2 February 2015 21	Málaga	1–0	Valencia	Málaga
20:45 CEST (UTC+01:00)	Castillejo 25'; Camacho (yellow card) 66'; Amrabat (yellow card) 67'; Darder (yellow card) 73'; Weligton (yellow card) 77'; Kameni (yellow card) 79'	Report	Otamendi (yellow card) 36'; Parejo (yellow card) 48'; Cancelo (yellow card) 59' (yellow-red card) 73'; Pérez (yellow card) 90+4'	Stadium: La Rosaleda; Attendance: 20,191; Referee: Carlos Clos Gómez

7 February 2015 22	Levante	4–1	Málaga	Valencia
20:00 CEST (UTC+01:00)	Barral 27', 37', 52'; Ramis (yellow card) 45+1'; K. Uche 75'; Camarasa (yellow card) 90+1'	Report	Juanmi 24'; Sánchez (yellow card) 62'	Stadium: Ciutat de València; Attendance: 14,500; Referee: Carlos del Cerro Grande

14 February 2015 23	Málaga	0–2	Espanyol	Málaga
22:00 CEST (UTC+01:00)	Darder (yellow card) 48'; Amrabat (yellow card) 51'; Camacho (yellow card) 55'	Report	Abraham (yellow card) 8'; Sánchez (yellow card) 24'; Álvaro 41'; Arbilla (yellow card) 62'; Stuani (yellow card) 77'; Colotto (red card) 82'; López (yellow card) 82'; Casilla (yellow card) 83'; S. García (yellow card) 90+1', (goal) 90+3'	Stadium: La Rosaleda; Attendance: 16,134; Referee: Jesús Gil Manzano

21 February 2015 24	Barcelona	0–1	Málaga	Barcelona
16:00 CEST (UTC+01:00)	Rafinha (yellow card) 12'; Piqué (yellow card) 79'; Neymar (yellow card) 87'; Alba (yellow card) 90+1'	Report	Juanmi 7'; Weligton (yellow card) 49'; Recio (yellow card) 62'; Duda (yellow card) 90+1'	Stadium: Camp Nou; Attendance: 78,276; Referee: Juan Martínez Munuera

28 February 2015 25	Málaga	3–2	Getafe	Málaga
22:00 CEST (UTC+01:00)	Juanmi 10'; Darder (yellow card) 16', (goal) 57'; Horta 68'; Rosales (yellow card) 86'; Castillejo (yellow card) 90+1'	Report	Alexis (yellow card) 25'; Vázquez 55', 76'	Stadium: La Rosaleda; Attendance: 21,600; Referee: Eduardo Prieto Iglesias

7 March 2015 26	Granada	1–0	Málaga	Granada
22:00 CEST (UTC+01:00)	Márquez (yellow card) 35'; Ibáñez 57'; Piti (yellow card) 61'; Córdoba (yellow card) 76'; Pérez (yellow card) 90'	Report	Angeleri (yellow card) 8'; Torres (yellow card) 20'; Juanmi (yellow card) 32'; Camacho (yellow card) 67'; Weligton (yellow card) 76'	Stadium: Los Cármenes; Attendance: 16,374; Referee: Antonio Mateu Lahoz

15 March 2015 27	Málaga	2–0	Córdoba	Málaga
17:00 CEST (UTC+01:00)	Juanmi 48'; Amrabat 84'	Report	Andone (yellow card) 83'; Bebé (yellow card) 86'	Stadium: La Rosaleda; Attendance: 24,547; Referee: José González González

21 March 2015 28	Rayo Vallecano	1–0	Málaga	Madrid
18:00 CEST (UTC+01:00)	Nacho (yellow card) 7'; Kakuta 22'; Amaya (yellow card) 32'; Baena (yellow card) 57'; Embarba (yellow card) 59'; Manucho (yellow card) 69'; Castro (yellow card) 83'; Trashorras (yellow card) 90+1'; Tito (yellow card) 90+4'	Report	Angeleri (yellow card) 26' (yellow-red card) 74'	Stadium: Campo de Vallecas; Attendance: 9,110; Referee: Santiago Jaime Latre

4 April 2015 29	Málaga	1–1	Real Sociedad	Málaga
22:00 CEST (UTC+02:00)	Recio 55'; Sánchez (yellow card) 65'; Castillejo (yellow card) 80'; Boka (yellow card) 90+2'; Weligton (yellow card) 90+2'	Report	Bergara (yellow card) 43'; I. Martínez (yellow card) 54'; Ansotegi (yellow card) 71'; Pardo 83', (yellow card) 90+4'; Prieto (yellow card) 87'	Stadium: La Rosaleda; Attendance: 22,000; Referee: Carlos del Cerro Grande

7 April 2015 30	Eibar	1–0	Málaga	Eibar
22:00 CEST (UTC+02:00)	García (yellow card) 40'; Arruabarrena 52'; Saúl (yellow card) 63'; Bóveda (yellow card) 87'	Report	Horta (yellow card) 25'; Juanpi (yellow card) 33'	Stadium: Ipurua; Attendance: 4,008; Referee: Jesús Gil Manzano

11 April 2015 31	Málaga	2–2	Atlético Madrid	Málaga
18:00 CEST (UTC+02:00)	F. Torres 37' (o.g.); Darder (yellow card) 67'; Samu 71'; Weligton (yellow card) 78'	Report	Griezmann 25', 78', (yellow card) 88'; Gabi (yellow card) 28'; Miranda (yellow card) 85'	Stadium: La Rosaleda; Attendance: 24,500; Referee: Antonio Mateu Lahoz

18 April 2015 32	Real Madrid	3–1	Málaga	Madrid
20:00 CEST (UTC+02:00)	Ramos 24'; Arbeloa (yellow card) 61'; Rodríguez 69'; Kroos (yellow card) 81'; Ronaldo 90+2'	Report	Juanmi 71'; Sánchez (yellow card) 77'; Tissone (yellow card) 87'	Stadium: Santiago Bernabéu; Attendance: 78,354; Referee: Iñaki Vicandi Garrido

26 April 2015 33	Málaga	1–1	Deportivo La Coruña	Málaga
12:00 CEST (UTC+02:00)	Amrabat 47', (yellow card) 71'; Weligton (yellow card) 58'; Sánchez (yellow card) 82'; Recio (yellow card) 90+1'; Juanmi (yellow card) 90+3'	Report	Insua (yellow card) 23'; Riera 60'	Stadium: La Rosaleda; Attendance: 23,851; Referee: Xavier Estrada Fernández

29 April 2015 34	Celta Vigo	1–0	Málaga	Vigo
20:00 CEST (UTC+02:00)	Nolito 89', (yellow card) 90'; Fernández (yellow card) 90+2'; López (yellow card) 90+2'	Report	Darder (yellow card) 40'; Juanmi (yellow card) 77'; Tissone (yellow card) 85'; Recio (yellow card) 90+2'; Weligton (yellow card) 90+2'	Stadium: Balaídos; Attendance: 17,205; Referee: Alejandro Hernández Hernández

3 May 2015 35	Málaga	1–2	Elche	Málaga
22:00 CEST (UTC+02:00)	Samu (yellow card) 36'; Juanmi (yellow card) 38'; Duda (yellow card) 73'; Guerra 90+4'	Report	Jonathas 29'; Suárez (yellow card) 57'; Tytoń (red card) 71'; Pašalić 89'	Stadium: La Rosaleda; Attendance: 18,714; Referee: Alberto Undiano Mallenco

10 May 2015 36	Almería	1–2	Málaga	Almería
19:00 CEST (UTC+02:00)	Thomas 31'; Casado (yellow card) 42'; Dubarbier (yellow card) 86'	Report	Casado 23' (o.g.); Weligton (yellow card) 34'; Guerra 69'; Amrabat (yellow card) 72'; Samu (yellow card) 78'; Recio (yellow card) 90+2'	Stadium: Mediterráneo; Attendance: 10,690; Referee: Eduardo Prieto Iglesias

17 May 2015 37	Villarreal	2–1	Málaga	Villarreal
19:00 CEST (UTC+02:00)	G. Dos Santos (yellow card) 69'; Vietto (yellow card) 73'; Gerard 82', 87'; Rukavina (yellow card) 86'	Report	Darder (yellow card) 76', (goal) 90'	Stadium: El Madrigal; Attendance: 13,105; Referee: Carlos Velasco Carballo

23 May 2015 38	Málaga	2–3	Sevilla	Málaga
18:30 CEST (UTC+02:00)	Weligton (red card) 26'; Recio (yellow card) 26'; Angeleri (yellow card) 35'; Guerra 67', 90+2'; Tissone (yellow card) 90+2'	Report	Vidal (yellow card) 13', (goal) 62'; Krychowiak (yellow card) 35'; Reyes 52'; Banega 55'	Stadium: La Rosaleda; Attendance: 23,103; Referee: Ignacio Iglesias Prieto

=== Copa del Rey ===
==== Round of 32 ====
3 December 2014 First leg	Deportivo La Coruña	1–1	Málaga	A Coruña
	Diakité (yellow card) 56'; Toché 68', (yellow card) 77'		Camacho 11'; Angeleri (yellow card) 43'; Rosales (yellow card) 50'	Stadium: Riazor; Attendance: 8,700; Referee: Antonio Mateu Lahoz

18 December 2014 Second leg	Málaga	4–1 (5–2 agg.)	Deportivo La Coruña	Málaga
	Santa Cruz 51', 68'; Recio 59'; Horta (yellow card) 83'; Camacho 89'		Postiga 57'; Lopo (yellow card) 76'	Stadium: La Rosaleda; Attendance: 18,000; Referee: Juan Martínez Munuera

==== Round of 16 ====
6 January 2015 First leg	Málaga	2–0	Levante	Málaga
	Juanpi 16'; Horta 78'		García (yellow card) 82'; El Adoua (yellow card) 88'	Stadium: La Rosaleda; Attendance: 10,000; Referee: Alejandro Hernández Hernández

13 January 2015 Second leg	Levante	3–2 (3–4 agg.)	Málaga	Valencia
	Gavilán (yellow card) 29'; Barral 71', 74', (yellow card) 78' (yellow-red card) 90'; P. López (yellow card) 72'; Juanfran 85'		Horta 22'; Recio 38'; Darder (yellow card) 88'	Stadium: Ciutat de València; Attendance: 3,500; Referee: José González González

==== Quarter-finals ====
21 January 2015 First leg	Málaga	0–0	Athletic Bilbao	Málaga
	Recio (yellow card) 62'; Weligton (yellow card) 81'		Laporte (yellow card) 55'	Stadium: La Rosaleda; Attendance: 12,000; Referee: Eduardo Prieto Iglesias

29 January 2015 Second leg	Athletic Bilbao	1–0 (1–0 agg.)	Málaga	Bilbao
	Aduriz 48'; De Marcos (yellow card) 57'; Etxeita (yellow card) 74'; Laporte (yellow card) 90'		Antunes (yellow card) 36'; Amrabat (yellow card) 38'; Recio (yellow card) 61'; Samu (yellow card) 88'; Camacho (yellow card) 90'; Duda (yellow card) 90+1'	Stadium: San Mamés; Attendance: 18,000; Referee: Carlos Velasco Carballo

=== UEFA Schalke Cup ===
==== Table ====
Pos	Team	Pld	W	D	L	GF	GA	GD	Pts	Result
1	(Spain) Málaga	2	2	0	0	5	1	+4	6	Champion
2	(England) Newcastle United	2	1	0	1	4	4	0	3	
3	(England) West Ham United	2	0	1	1	0	2	−2	2	
4	(Germany) Schalke 04	2	0	1	1	1	3	−2	1	

Source: Matches
Rules for classification: (1) points; (2) goal difference; (3) goals scored

==== Matches ====
2 August 2014	Málaga	3–1	Newcastle United	Gelsenkirchen, Germany
14:30 BST	Darder 25'; Castillejo 32', 43'	Report	Obertan 60'	Stadium: Veltins-Arena; Referee: Christian Bandurski

3 August 2014	Málaga	2–0	West Ham United	Gelsenkirchen, Germany
14:30 BST	Rescaldani 22'; Luis Alberto 24'	Report		Stadium: Veltins-Arena; Referee: Arne Aarnink
