= 2013–14 Málaga CF season =

Málaga
2013–14 season
- President: Sheikh Abdullah Al Thani
- Manager: Bernd Schuster
- Stadium: La Rosaleda Stadium
- La Liga: 11th
- Copa del Rey: Round of 32
Home colours	Away colours	Third colours

The 2013–14 season was the 82nd season in Málaga CF's history and their 33rd season in La Liga, the top division of Spanish football. The 2013–14 season covered the period from 1 July 2013 to 30 June 2014.

Málaga competed for an ambitious run in La Liga. They entered the Copa del Rey in the Round of 32. Their participation to the UEFA Europa League was denied by the Court of Arbitration for Sport.

== Players ==
=== Squad information ===
The numbers are established according to the official website: www.malagacf.es and www.lfp.es

Updated 27 June 2013

N	Pos.	Nat.	Name	Age	EU	Since	App	Goals	Ends	Transfer fee	Notes
1	GK	(Cameroon)	Carlos Kameni	41	EU	2012 (Winter)	12	0	2014	Free	Second nationality: France
2	RB	(Spain)	Jesús Gámez (captain)	40	EU	2005	254	1	2016	Youth system	
3	CB	(Brazil)	Weligton (VC)	46	Non-EU	2007	180	8	2013	Free	
4	CB	(Portugal)	Flávio Ferreira	34	EU	2013	0	0	2016	€500,000	
5	LB	(Portugal)	Vitorino Antunes	38	EU	2013	23	1	2017	€1,250,000	
6	DM	(Spain)	Ignacio Camacho	35	EU	2011 (Winter)	69	3	2014	€1,500,000	
7	FW	(Morocco)	Mounir El Hamdaoui	41	EU	2013	8	3	2014	Loan	Second nationality: Holland
8	AM	(Spain)	Francisco Portillo	35	EU	2010	57	4	2015	Youth system	
9	FW	(Paraguay)	Roque Santa Cruz	44	EU	2013	41	11	2016	Free	Second nationality: Spain
10	AM	(Ivory Coast)	Bobley Anderson	33	Non-EU	2013	6	0	2018	€1,000,000	
12	DM	(Argentina)	Fernando Tissone	39	EU	2013	12	1	2016	Free	Second nationality: Italy
13	GK	(Argentina)	Willy Caballero	44	EU	2011 (Winter)	91	0	2016	€900,000	Second nationality: Spain
14	AM	(Chile)	Pedro Morales	40	Non-EU	2013	15	4	2015	Free	
16	RB	(Argentina)	Marcos Angeleri	42	EU	2013	8	0	2016	€230,000	Second nationality: Italy
17	LW	(Portugal)	Duda (VC)	45	EU	2008	231	30	2015	Free	
18	LB	(Portugal)	Eliseu	42	EU	2010	171	19	2014	€2,000,000	
19	FW	(Poland)	Bartłomiej Pawłowski	33	EU	2013	4	1	2014	Loan	
21	CB	(Spain)	Sergio Sánchez	39	EU	2011	47	0	2015	€2,800,000	
23	CB	(Panama)	Roberto Chen	31	Non-EU	2013	2	0	2016	€380,000	
24	FW	(Spain)	Samu	35	EU	2013	4	1	2016	Youth system	
28	FW	(Cameroon)	Fabrice Olinga	29	EU	2012	8	1	2014	Youth system	Second nationality: Spain
30	DM	(Spain)	Sergi Darder	32	EU	2013	10	0	2017	Youth system	
	LB	(Spain)	José Manuel Casado	39	EU	2013	0	0	2015	Free	

=== Transfers ===
==== In ====
No.	Pos.	Nat.	Name	Age	EU	Moving from	Type	Transfer window	Ends	Transfer fee	Source
	ST	(Portugal)	Edinho	43	EU	Académica (Portugal)	Loan return	Summer	2013	N/A	Todomercadoweb
14	AM	(Chile)	Pedro Morales	40	Non-EU	Dinamo Zagreb (Croatia)	Transfer	Summer	2015	Free	LaopiniondeMálaga.es
25	LB	(Portugal)	Vitorino Antunes	38	EU	Paços de Ferreira (Portugal)	Transfer	Summer	2017	€1,250,000	LaopiniondeMálaga.es
	CB	(Portugal)	Flávio Ferreira	34	EU	Académica (Portugal)	Transfer	Summer	2016	€500,000	Málagacf.com
	AM	(Ivory Coast)	Bobley Anderson	33	Non-EU	Wydad Casablanca	Transfer	Summer	2018	€1M	Málagacf.com
	DM	(Argentina)	Fernando Tissone	39	EU	Sampdoria (Italy)	Transfer	Summer	2016	Free	Málagacf.com
	FW	(Paraguay)	Roque Santa Cruz	44	EU	Manchester City (England)	Transfer	Summer	2016	Free	Málagacf.com
	DF	(Argentina)	Marcos Angeleri	42	EU	Estudiantes La Plata (Argentina)	Transfer	Summer	2016	€230,000	Málagacf.com
	FW	(Poland)	Bartłomiej Pawłowski	33	EU	Widzew Łódź (Poland)	Loan	Summer	2014	N/A	Málagacf.com
	CB	(Panama)	Roberto Chen	31	Non-EU	San Francisco (Panama)	Transfer	Summer	2016	€380,000	LaopiniondeMálaga.es
	FW	(Morocco)	Mounir El Hamdaoui	41	EU	Fiorentina (Italy)	Loan	Summer	2014	N/A	Málagacf.com
	LB	(Spain)	José Manuel Casado	39	EU	Free agent	Transfer	Summer	2015	Free	Málagacf.com

Total expenditure: €3,360,000 ▼

==== Out ====
No.	Pos.	Nat.	Name	Age	EU	Moving to	Type	Transfer window	Transfer fee	Source
	ST	(Portugal)	Edinho	43	EU	Braga (Portugal)	Transfer	Summer	Free	Todomercado.es
16	DM	(Chile)	Manuel Iturra	41	EU	Granada	Transfer	Summer	Free	Fichajes.com
7	RW	(Spain)	Joaquín	44	EU	Fiorentina (Italy)	Transfer	Summer	€2,000,000	Acuerdo con la Málagacf.com
22	AM	(Spain)	Isco	33	EU	Real Madrid	Transfer	Summer	€24,000,000	realmadrid.com
8	DM	(France)	Jérémy Toulalan	42	EU	Monaco (France)	Transfer	Summer	€5,000,000	Málagacf.com
5	CB	(Argentina)	Martín Demichelis	45	EU	Atlético Madrid	Transfer	Summer	Free	clubatleticomadrid.com
10	AM	(Brazil)	Júlio Baptista	44	EU	Cruzeiro (Brazil)	Contract cancellation	Summer	Free	LaopiniondeMálaga.es
	GK	(Spain)	Rubén	41	EU	Rayo Vallecano	Contract cancellation	Summer	Free	Málagacf.com
11	FW	(Uruguay)	Sebastián Fernández	40	EU	Rayo Vallecano	Contract cancellation	Summer	Free	

Total income: ▲€31,000,000

== Club ==
=== Coaching staff ===
Position	Staff
Head coach	(Germany) Bernd Schuster
2nd coach	(Switzerland) Fabio Celestini
Technical assistant	(Spain) Enrique Ruiz
General manager	(Qatar) Moyad Shatat
Sporting Director	TBA
Sporting Adviser	(Spain) Antonio Tapia
Physical trainer	(Spain) Carlos Cascallana
Goalkeepers coach	(Spain) Xabi Mancisidor
Physical readaptor	(Spain) Fernando Lacomba
Head of medical services	(Spain) Juan Carlos Pérez Frías
Masseuse	(Spain) Marcelino Torrontegui
Physiotherapists	(Spain) Luis Barbado, Hugo Camarero
Team delegate	(Spain) Vicente Valcarce
Field delegates	(Spain) Giráldez Carrasco, Miguel Zambrana, Juan Carlos Salcedo

Source: Malagacf.com

== Pre-season and friendlies ==
17 July 2013	Genk	0−1	Málaga	Genk, Belgium
20:00 CEST			Duda 25' (pen.)	Stadium: Cristal Arena; Attendance: 10,000; Referee: Serge Gumienny

19 July 2013	Kaller SC	1−7	Málaga	Kall, Germany
00:00 CEST	Michels 10'		Baptista 32' (pen.); Fernández 57'; Samu 61'; Juanmi 65', 76', 88'; Darder 73'	Stadium: TBD; Attendance: 3,000

21 July 2013	Galatasaray	3−3	Málaga	İzmir, Turkey
20:00 CEST	Sneijder 12'; Drogba 45'; Kazim-Richards 89'	Report	Santa Cruz 44'; Anderson 57'; Duda 74' (pen.)	Stadium: İzmir Atatürk Stadium; Attendance: 32,000; Referee: Halil Umut Meler

21 July 2013	Gençlerbirliği	1−0	Málaga	Munich, Germany
19:00 CEST	Delibalta 82'	Report		Stadium: TSV Stadium; Attendance: 300; Referee: Asno Blos

27 July 2013	FC Augsburg	0−1	Málaga	Augsburg, Germany
15:30 CEST		Report	Gámez 67'	Stadium: SGL Arena; Attendance: 11,000; Referee: Günter Perl

30 July 2013	Algeciras	0−4	Málaga	Algeciras, Spain
21:00 CEST		Report	Duda 20'; Portillo 30'; Moreno 81'; Fernández 82'	Stadium: Estadio Nuevo Mirador; Attendance: 5,000; Referee: Adolfo Vizuete Sánchez

3 August 2013	Wydad Casablanca	0−1	Málaga	Casablanca, Morocco
23:00 CEST		Report	Olinga 10'	Stadium: Stade Mohamed V Attendance: 40,000; Referee: Redouane Jalid

10 August 2013	Aston Villa	3–2	Málaga	Birmingham, England
15:00 CEST	Benteke 12', 30' (pen.); Vlaar 20'		Okore 42' (o.g.); Darder 62'	Stadium: Villa Park; Attendance: 22,150

== Post-season friendlies ==
19 May 2014	Málaga	3–2	El Palo	Málaga
20:30	Juanmi; Santa Cruz 81'; Pedro Montero 82'		Juanillo 85', 86'	Stadium: La Rosaleda

== La Liga ==
=== Results summary ===
Overall								Home						Away					
Pld	W	D	L	GF	GA	GD	Pts	W	D	L	GF	GA	GD	W	D	L	GF	GA	GD
6	2	2	2	9	4	+5	8	2	0	1	7	1	+6	0	2	1	2	3	−1

Last updated: 26 June 2013.
Source: Competitive matches

=== Results by round ===
Round	1	2	3	4	5	6	7	8	9	10	11	12	13	14	15	16	17	18	19	20	21	22	23	24	25	26	27	28	29	30	31	32	33	34	35	36	37	38
Ground	A	H	A	H	A	H	A	H	A	H	A	H	A	H	A	H	A	H	A	H	A	H	A	H	A	H	A	H	A	H	A	H	A	H	A	H	A	H
Result	L	L	D	W	D	W	D	L	L	L	D	W	L	L	D	W	W	L	L	D	L	W	L	L	D	D	W	L	W	L	W	W	L	W	L	L	D	W
Position	16	19	18	10	11	8	10	10	13	16	15	12	14	14	15	13	10	11	14	14	16	13	16	17	17	16	13	14	13	14	12	11	11	10	13	13	13	11

Updated to match(es) played on 25 September 2013. Source: Competitive matches
A = Away; H = Home; W = Win; D = Draw; L = Loss

=== Matches ===
17 August 2013 1	Valencia	1–0	Málaga	Valencia
23:00 CEST	Míchel (yellow card) 13'; Pereira (yellow card) 53'; R. Costa 64', (yellow card) 86'	Report	Morales (yellow card) 26'; Chen (yellow card) 38'; Antunes (yellow card) 46'; Darder (yellow card) 66'; Olinga (yellow card) 78'	Stadium: Mestalla; Attendance: 34,500; Referee: Alfonso Álvarez Izquierdo (Catalonia)

25 August 2013 2	Málaga	0–1	Barcelona	Málaga
21:00 CEST	Gámez (yellow card) 57'; S. Sánchez (yellow card) 61'; Darder (yellow card) 72'	Report	Adriano 44'; A. Sánchez (yellow card) 62'; Alves (yellow card) 84'	Stadium: La Rosaleda; Attendance: 28,513; Referee: Antonio Mateu Lahoz (Valencian Community)

1 September 2013 3	Sevilla	2−2	Málaga	Seville
21:00 CEST	Mbia (yellow card) 31'; Gameiro 44', 72'; Cala (yellow card) 60'; Rakitić (yellow card) 74'	Report	Darder (yellow card) 17'; Sánchez (yellow card) 29'; Angeleri (yellow card) 34'; Morales 40'; Santa Cruz 68'; Duda (red card) 90+1'	Stadium: Ramón Sánchez Pizjuán; Attendance: 29,849; Referee: Carlos del Cerro Grande

15 September 2013 4	Málaga	5–0	Rayo Vallecano	Málaga
20:00 CEST	El Hamdaoui 31', 62', 67'; Portillo 40'; Eliseu (yellow card) 47', (goal) 49'; Antunes (yellow card) 57'	Report	Galeano (yellow card) 8'; Arbilla (yellow card) 62'	Stadium: La Rosaleda; Attendance: 22,317; Referee: Alejandro Hernández Hernández

21 September 2013 5	Real Sociedad	0–0	Málaga	San Sebastián
16:00 CEST	I. Martínez (yellow card) 19'; Prieto (yellow card) 40'; Pardo (yellow card) 46'	Report	Angeleri (yellow card) 48'; Tissone (yellow card) 50'; Sánchez (yellow card) 73'	Stadium: Anoeta; Attendance: 25,265; Referee: José Teixeira Vitienes

25 September 2013 6	Málaga	2–0	Almería	Málaga
22:00 CEST	Tissone 68', (yellow card) 68'; Sánchez (yellow card) 84'; Portillo 90+1'	Report	Dubarbier (yellow card) 66'	Stadium: La Rosaleda; Attendance: 20,533; Referee: Carlos Clos Gómez

27 September 2013 7	Real Valladolid	2–2	Málaga	Valladolid
21:00 CEST	Sastre (yellow card) 41'; Guerra 56', (yellow card) 90+1'; Osorio 64'; Baraja (yellow card) 68'	Report	Santa Cruz 24'; Pawłowski 76'	Stadium: José Zorrilla; Attendance: 13,060; Referee: Juan Martínez Munuera

4 October 2013 8	Málaga	0−1	Osasuna	Málaga
22:00 CEST	Caballero (yellow card) 74'; Gámez (yellow card) 90+3'	Report	Riera 23', (yellow card) 90+4'; Arribas (yellow card) 55'; Silva (yellow card) 60'; Damià (yellow card) 63'; Bertrán (yellow card) 71'	Stadium: La Rosaleda; Attendance: 21,538; Referee: Jesús Gil Manzano

19 October 2013 9	Real Madrid	2–0	Málaga	Madrid
16:00 CEST	Di María 46'; Ronaldo 90+1' (pen.); Carvajal (yellow card) 90+3'	Report	Antunes (yellow card) 12'; Eliseu (yellow card) 49'; Gámez (yellow card) 72'; Sánchez (yellow card) 79'; Weligton (yellow card) 82'	Stadium: Santiago Bernabéu; Attendance: 78,362; Referee: Miguel Ayza Gámez; Man of the Match: Di María

26 October 2013 10	Málaga	0–5	Celta Vigo	Málaga
16:00 CEST	Gámez (yellow card) 77'; Pawłowski (yellow card) 87'	Report	López 6', 64'; Fernández 23'; Nolito 73'; Charles 81'	Stadium: La Rosaleda; Attendance: 28,000; Referee: Xavier Estrada Fernández

29 October 2013 11	Espanyol	0–0	Málaga	Cornellà de Llobregat
20:00 CEST	López (yellow card) 54'	Report	Tissone (yellow card) 8'; Olinga (yellow card) 68'; Oliveira (yellow card) 90+1'	Stadium: Cornellà-El Prat; Attendance: 16,143; Referee: Carlos Delgado Ferreiro

3 November 2013 12	Málaga	3–2	Real Betis	Málaga
21:00 CET	Santa Cruz 13'; Eliseu 61'; Tissone (yellow card) 75'; Samu 90+4'	Report	Verdú 33'; Juan Carlos (yellow card) 35'; Nono (yellow card) 48'; Figueras 63'	Stadium: La Rosaleda; Attendance: 21,209; Referee: Alberto Undiano Mallenco

8 November 2013 13	Granada	3–1	Málaga	Granada
22:00 CET	Yebda (yellow card) 34'; Brahimi (yellow card) 44'; El-Arabi 48', 59', 77'; Buonanotte (yellow card) 53'	Report	Juanmi 54'; Sánchez (yellow card) 80'; Gámez (yellow card) 85'; Angeleri (yellow card) 88'	Stadium: Los Cármenes; Attendance: 14,863; Referee: Eduardo Prieto Iglesias

25 November 2013 14	Málaga	1–2	Athletic Bilbao	Málaga
22:00 CET	Samu (yellow card) 30'; Juanmi 38'; Weligton (yellow card) 41'; Angeleri (yellow card) 56'; Eliseu (yellow card) 71'; Portillo (yellow card) 76' (yellow-red card) 83'	Report	San José (yellow card) 45', (goal) 69'; Muniain 86'	Stadium: La Rosaleda; Attendance: 18,643; Referee: Ignacio Iglesias Villanueva

26 November 2013 15	Villarreal	1–1	Málaga	Vilarreal
20:30 CET	Bruno 32', (yellow card) 74'	Report	Camacho (yellow card) 19'; Juanmi (yellow card) 43'; Eliseu (yellow card) 52'; Anderson (yellow card) 87'; Weligton 90+4'	Stadium: El Madrigal; Attendance: 13,793; Referee: José Luis González González

14 December 2013 16	Málaga	1–0	Getafe	Málaga
22:00 CEST	Eliseu (yellow card) 54'; Santa Cruz 75'; Duda (yellow card) 78'; Juanmi (yellow card) 81'; Weligton (yellow card) 88'	Report	Arroyo (yellow card) 21'; Rafa (yellow card) 74'; Marica (yellow card) 88'; Colunga (yellow card) 90'	Stadium: La Rosaleda; Attendance: 16,810; Referee: Alfonso Álfonso Izquierdo

20 December 2013 17	Elche	0–1	Málaga	Elche
20:30 CET	Suárez (yellow card) 28' (yellow-red card) 60'; Sánchez (yellow card) 82'; Albácar (yellow card) 84'; Coro (yellow card) 90+2'	Report	Camacho 6', (yellow card) 27'; Gámez (yellow card) 30'; Duda (yellow card) 84'; Tissone (yellow card) 84'	Stadium: Manuel Martínez Valero; Attendance: 19,124; Referee: Carlos del Cerro Grande

4 January 2014 18	Málaga	0–1	Atlético Madrid	Málaga
16:00 CET	Darder (yellow card) 24'; Angeleri (yellow card) 41'; Samu (yellow card) 87'; Antunes (yellow card) 89'	Report	Miranda (yellow card) 10'; Tiago (yellow card) 26'; Juanfran (yellow card) 53'; Koke 70'; Costa (yellow card) 77'; Courtois (yellow card) 83'; Rodríguez (yellow card) 86'	Stadium: La Rosaleda; Attendance: 26,911; Referee: José Teixeira Vitienes

12 January 2014 19	Levante	1–0	Málaga	Valencia
21:00 CET	Barral 19', (yellow card) 67'; López (yellow card) 25'; Karabelas (yellow card) 73'; Ríos (yellow card) 81'	Report	Ferreira (yellow card) 44'; Tissone (yellow card) 61'; Gámez (yellow card) 65'; Sánchez (yellow card) 66'; Samu (yellow card) 75'; Duda (yellow card) 90'	Stadium: Ciutat de València; Attendance: 11,278; Referee: Alberto Undiano Mallenco

17 January 2014 20	Málaga	0–0	Valencia	Málaga
21:00 CET	Eliseu (yellow card) 28'; Sánchez (yellow card) 45+1'	Report	Mathieu (yellow card) 17'; Romeu (yellow card) 43'; Piatti (yellow card) 66'; Alcácer (yellow card) 70'	Stadium: La Rosaleda; Attendance: 15,102; Referee: Carlos Velasco Carballo

26 January 2014 21	Barcelona	3–0	Málaga	Barcelona
21:00 CET	Piqué (yellow card) 30', (goal) 40'; Pedro 55'; Sánchez 61'	Report	Pérez (yellow card) 16'; Duda (yellow card) 31'; Ferreira (yellow card) 71'	Stadium: Camp Nou; Attendance: 56,355; Referee: Carlos Clos Gómez

1 February 2014 22	Málaga	3–2	Sevilla	Málaga
22:00 CET	Duda 31' (pen.), 83', (yellow card) 83'; Antunes (yellow card) 41'; Eliseu (yellow card) 45'; Sánchez (yellow card) 89'	Report	Coke (yellow card) 29'; Moreno (yellow card) 34'; Vitolo (yellow card) 36'; Bacca 49', (yellow card) 78'; Fazio 66'; Iborra (yellow card) 76'	Stadium: La Rosaleda; Attendance: 30,377; Referee: José Luis González González

14 February 2014 23	Rayo Vallecano	4–1	Málaga	Madrid
18:00 CET	Falque 26', 63'; Arbilla 28', (yellow card) 84'; Larrivey 45' (pen.); Saúl (yellow card) 52'; Nacho (yellow card) 62'	Report	Sánchez (yellow card) 5' (yellow-red card) 45'; Antunes (yellow card) 16'; Pérez (yellow card) 30'; Camacho (yellow card) 51'; Yakovenko 72'	Stadium: Campo de Vallecas; Attendance: 9,500; Referee: Antonio Mateu Lahoz

17 February 2014 24	Málaga	0–1	Real Sociedad	Málaga
22:00 CET	Antunes (yellow card) 39'; Ferreira (yellow card) 90'; Duda (yellow card) 90+3'	Report	Vela 10'	Stadium: La Rosaleda; Attendance: 18,000; Referee: Carlos del Cerro Grande

22 February 2014 25	Almería	0–0	Málaga	Almería
22:00 CET	Soriano (yellow card) 30'; Verza (yellow card) 37'	Report	Antunes (yellow card) 33'; Angeleri (yellow card) 35'; Gámez (yellow card) 45+1'; Yakovenko (yellow card) 85'; Pérez (yellow card) 87'	Stadium: Mediterráneo; Attendance: 9,784; Referee: César Muñiz Fernández

1 March 2014 26	Málaga	1–1	Real Valladolid	Málaga
16:00 CET	Santa Cruz 13'	Report	Larsson 30'; Mitrović (yellow card) 80'	Stadium: La Rosaleda; Attendance: 21,591; Referee: Alberto Undiano Mallenco

10 March 2014 27	Osasuna	0–2	Málaga	Pamplona
20:00 CET	Silva (yellow card) 85'	Report	Samu 14'; Gámez (yellow card) 40' (yellow-red card) 52'; Darder (yellow card) 41'; Caballero (yellow card) 60'; Camacho (yellow card) 63'; Amrabat 66'	Stadium: El Sadar; Attendance: 15,300; Referee: Fernando Teixeira Vitienes

15 March 2014 28	Málaga	0–1	Real Madrid	Málaga
20:00 CET	Antunes (yellow card) 19'; Duda (yellow card) 61'	Report	Ronaldo 23'	Stadium: La Rosaleda; Attendance: 29,265; Referee: Juan Martínez Munuera

21 March 2014 29	Celta Vigo	0–2	Málaga	Vigo
21:00 CET	Krohn-Dehli (yellow card) 86'	Report	Camacho 24', 32', (yellow card) 46'; Angeleri (yellow card) 36'; Duda (yellow card) 40' (red card) 65'; Sánchez (yellow card) 62'; Darder (yellow card) 69'	Stadium: Balaídos; Attendance: 21,669; Referee: Jesús Gil Manzano

25 March 2014 30	Málaga	1–2	Espanyol	Málaga
20:00 CET	Pérez 34', (yellow card) 51' (yellow-red card) 78'; Yakovenko (yellow card) 90+3'	Report	Stuani (yellow card) 16'; García 33'; Pizzi 76'	Stadium: La Rosaleda; Attendance: 24,879; Referee: Carlos Delgado Ferreiro

31 March 2014 31	Real Betis	1–2	Málaga	Seville
22:00 CEST	N'Diaye (yellow card) 12'; Reyes 30'; Juanfran (yellow card) 45'	Report	Antunes (yellow card) 23'; Ferreira (yellow card) 25'; Amrabat (yellow card) 47'; Santa Cruz (yellow card) 53'; Sánchez (yellow card) 60'; Juanmi (yellow card) 76', (goal) 83'; Darder 87'; Camacho (yellow card) 90'	Stadium: Benito Villamarín; Attendance: 33,488; Referee: Antonio Mateu Lahoz

6 April 2014 32	Málaga	4–1	Granada	Málaga
12:00 CEST	Camacho 14', 37'; Ferreira (yellow card) 17'; Antunes (yellow card) 20'; Amrabat 50' (pen.); Caballero (yellow card) 65'; Juanmi 74'	Report	El-Arabi (yellow card) 24', (goal) 78'; Murillo (yellow card) 49'; Buonanotte (yellow card) 57'; Angulo (yellow card) 59'; Iturra (yellow card) 88'	Stadium: La Rosaleda; Attendance: 21,000; Referee: Fernando Teixeira Vitienes

14 April 2014 33	Athletic Bilbao	3–0	Málaga	Bilbao
22:00 CEST	Aduriz 4', 46'; Herrera 62'	Report	Pérez (yellow card) 42'; Weligton (yellow card) 45+1'; Juanmi (yellow card) 57'; Yakovenko (yellow card) 82'	Stadium: San Mamés; Attendance: 34,000; Referee: José Luis González González

21 April 2014 34	Málaga	2–0	Villarreal	Málaga
22:00 CEST	Santa Cruz 6'; Samu (yellow card) 43'; Darder 53'; Ferreira (yellow card) 64'; Camacho (yellow card) 71'; Amrabat (red card) 74'	Report	Aquino (yellow card) 15'; Musacchio (yellow card) 47'; Pina (yellow card) 70'	Stadium: La Rosaleda; Attendance: 15,789; Referee: Alfonso Álvarez Izquierdo

26 April 2014 35	Getafe	1–0	Málaga	Getafe
18:00 CEST	Colunga 8', (yellow card) 44'; Marica (yellow card) 12' (yellow-red card) 37'; Gavilán (yellow card) 37'; Lacen (yellow card) 70'; Escudero (yellow card) 79'; López (yellow card) 85'; Pedro León (yellow card) 88'	Report	Angeleri (yellow card) 40' (yellow-red card) 76'; Eliseu (yellow card) 68'; Yakovenko (yellow card) 86'; Gámez (yellow card) 90+4'	Stadium: Coliseum Alfonso Pérez; Attendance: 6,500; Referee: César Muñiz Fernández

3 May 2014 36	Málaga	0–1	Elche	Málaga
18:00 CEST	Duda (yellow card) 69'	Report	Rodrigues 11'; Sánchez (yellow card) 19'; Suárez (yellow card) 26'; Márquez (yellow card) 52'; Toño (red card) 68'; Botía (red card) 82'; Herrera (yellow card) 90+6'	Stadium: La Rosaleda; Attendance: 21,329; Referee: Xavier Estrada Fernández

11 May 2014 37	Atlético Madrid	1–1	Málaga	Madrid
19:00 CEST	Turan (yellow card) 35'; Alderweireld 74'; Tiago (yellow card) 78'; Gabi (yellow card) 87'	Report	Weligton (yellow card) 4'; Angeleri (yellow card) 43' (yellow-red card) 88'; Eliseu (yellow card) 51'; Samu 65'; Duda (yellow card) 82'	Stadium: Vicente Calderón; Attendance: 46,000; Referee: José Teixeira Vitienes

16 May 2014 38	Málaga	1–0	Levante	Málaga
21:00 CEST	Portillo 60'	Report	Diop (yellow card) 29' (yellow-red card) 80'; Navarro (yellow card) 56'	Stadium: La Rosaleda; Attendance: 19,526; Referee: Eduardo Prieto Iglesias

=== Copa del Rey ===
==== Round of 32 ====
8 December 2013 First leg	Málaga	3–3	Osasuna	Málaga
	Gámez (yellow card) 20'; Sánchez 31'; Antunes 38'; Juanmi 47'; Angeleri (yellow card) 80'; Camacho (red card) 84'		Loé (yellow card) 4' (yellow-red card) 64'; Onwu (yellow card) 7', (goal) 62'; Armenteros (yellow card) 39', (goal) 78'; Torres 57'; Riesgo (yellow card) 90+1'	Stadium: La Rosaleda; Attendance: 22,000; Referee: Jesús Gil Manzano

17 December 2013 Second leg	Osasuna	1–1 (4–4 agg.)	Málaga	Pamplona
	Weligton 1' (o.g)		Gámez (yellow card) 29'; Eliseu 61'; Darder (yellow card) 87'; Samu (yellow card) 88'	Stadium: El Sadar; Attendance: 10,538; Referee: Miguel Ayza Gámez

== Statistics ==
=== Goals ===
R	Player	Position	League	Copa del Rey	Total
1	(Paraguay) Roque Santa Cruz	CF	6	0	6
2	(Morocco) Mounir El Hamdaoui	CF	3	0	3
2	(Spain) Juanmi	RW	2	1	3
2	(Portugal) Eliseu	LW	2	1	3
5	(Spain) Francisco Portillo	RW	2	0	2
6	(Chile) Pedro Morales	AM	1	0	1
6	(Argentina) Fernando Tissone	DM	1	0	1
6	(Poland) Bartłomiej Pawłowski	CF	1	0	1
6	(Spain) Samu	CF	1	0	1
6	(Brazil) Weligton	CB	1	0	1
6	(Spain) Ignacio Camacho	DM	1	0	1
6	(Spain) Sergio Sánchez	CB	0	1	1
6	(Portugal) Vitorino Antunes	LB	0	1	1

Last updated: 20 December 2013
Source: Match reports in Competitive matches
