= 2016–17 Villarreal CF season =

Villarreal
2016–17 season
- President: Fernando Roig
- Head coach: Fran Escribá
- Stadium: La Cerámica
- La Liga: 5th
- Copa del Rey: Round of 16
- UEFA Champions League: Play-off round
- UEFA Europa League: Round of 32
- Top goalscorer: League: Cédric Bakambu (11); All: Cédric Bakambu (12)
| Home colours | Away colours | Third colours |

The 2016–17 season was Villarreal Club de Fútbol's 94th season in existence and the club's 4th consecutive season in the top flight of Spanish football. In addition to the domestic league, Villarreal participated in this season's editions of the Copa del Rey, the UEFA Champions League and the UEFA Europa League. The season covered the period from 1 July 2016 to 30 June 2017.

== Players ==
=== Current squad ===
As of 13 August 2016

Note: Flags indicate national team as defined under FIFA eligibility rules; some limited exceptions apply. Players may hold more than one non-FIFA nationality.

| No. | Pos. | Nation | Player |
|---|---|---|---|
| 1 | GK | ESP | Sergio Asenjo |
| 2 | DF | ESP | Mario Gaspar (vice-captain) |
| 3 | DF | ESP | José Ángel (on loan from Porto) |
| 5 | DF | ARG | Mateo Musacchio (3rd captain) |
| 6 | DF | ESP | Víctor Ruiz |
| 7 | MF | RUS | Denis Cheryshev |
| 8 | MF | MEX | Jonathan dos Santos |
| 9 | FW | ESP | Roberto Soldado |
| 11 | DF | ESP | Jaume Costa |
| 12 | DF | ESP | Álvaro |
| 13 | GK | ESP | Andrés Fernández (on loan from Porto) |
| 14 | MF | ESP | Manu Trigueros |

| No. | Pos. | Nation | Player |
|---|---|---|---|
| 15 | FW | ESP | Adrián (on loan from Porto) |
| 16 | MF | ESP | Rodrigo Hernández |
| 17 | FW | COD | Cédric Bakambu |
| 18 | FW | ITA | Nicola Sansone |
| 19 | MF | ESP | Samu Castillejo |
| 20 | MF | ITA | Roberto Soriano |
| 21 | MF | ESP | Bruno (captain) |
| 22 | DF | SRB | Antonio Rukavina |
| 23 | DF | ITA | Daniele Bonera |
| 24 | FW | COL | Rafael Santos Borré (on loan from Atlético Madrid) |
| 25 | GK | ARG | Mariano Barbosa |

=== Out on loan ===
Note: Flags indicate national team as defined under FIFA eligibility rules; some limited exceptions apply. Players may hold more than one non-FIFA nationality.

| No. | Pos. | Nation | Player |
|---|---|---|---|
| — | DF | ESP | Pablo Íñiguez (at Rayo Vallecano until 30 June 2017) |
| — | DF | ESP | Adrián Marín (at Leganés until 30 June 2017) |
| — | MF | SEN | Alfred N'Diaye (at Hull City until 30 June 2017) |
| — | MF | ESP | Alfonso Pedraza (at Leeds United until 30 June 2017) |

| No. | Pos. | Nation | Player |
|---|---|---|---|
| — | MF | ESP | Matías Nahuel (at Real Betis until 30 June 2018) |
| — | FW | QAT | Akram Afif (at Sporting de Gijón until 30 June 2017) |
| — | FW | ARG | Cristian Espinoza (at Real Valladolid until 30 June 2017) |

== Competitions ==
=== Overall record ===
| Competition | First match | Last match | Starting round | Final position | Record | | | | | | | |
| Competition | First match | Last match | Starting round | Final position | Pld | W | D | L | GF | GA | GD | Win % |
|---|---|---|---|---|---|---|---|---|---|---|---|---|
| La Liga | 20 August 2016 | 21 May 2017 | Matchday 1 | 5th | 38 | 19 | 10 | 9 | 56 | 33 | +23 | 50.00 |
| Copa del Rey | 30 November 2016 | 11 January 2017 | Round of 32 | Round of 16 | 4 | 1 | 2 | 1 | 6 | 5 | +1 | 25.00 |
| UEFA Champions League | 17 August 2016 | 23 August 2016 | Play-off round | Play-off round | 2 | 0 | 0 | 2 | 1 | 3 | −2 | 0.00 |
| UEFA Europa League | 15 September 2016 | 23 February 2017 | Group stage | Round of 32 | 8 | 3 | 3 | 2 | 10 | 12 | −2 | 37.50 |
| Total | | | | | 52 | 23 | 15 | 14 | 73 | 53 | +20 | 44.23 |

Source: Competitions

=== La Liga ===
==== League table ====
| Pos | Team | Pld | W | D | L | GF | GA | GD | Pts | Qualification or relegation |
|---|---|---|---|---|---|---|---|---|---|---|
| 3 | Atlético Madrid | 38 | 23 | 9 | 6 | 70 | 27 | +43 | 78 | Qualification for the Champions League group stage |
| 4 | Sevilla | 38 | 21 | 9 | 8 | 69 | 49 | +20 | 72 | Qualification for the Champions League play-off round |
| 5 | Villarreal | 38 | 19 | 10 | 9 | 56 | 33 | +23 | 67 | Qualification for the Europa League group stage (Note: Since the winners of the 2016–17 Copa del Rey, Barcelona, qualified for European competition based on league position, the spot awarded to the cup winners (Europa League group stage) was passed to the sixth-placed team and the spot awarded to the sixth-placed team (Europa League third qualifying round) was passed to the seventh-placed team.) |
| 6 | Real Sociedad | 38 | 19 | 7 | 12 | 59 | 53 | +6 | 64 | Qualification for the Europa League group stage |
| 7 | Athletic Bilbao | 38 | 19 | 6 | 13 | 53 | 43 | +10 | 63 | Qualification for the Europa League third qualifying round |

Source: La Liga, Soccerway
Rules for classification: 1) Points; 2) Head-to-head points; 3) Head-to-head goal difference; 4) Goal difference; 5) Goals scored; 6) Fair-play points; 7) Play-off.

==== Results summary ====
| Overall | | | | | | | | Home | | | | | | Away | | | | | |
| Pld | W | D | L | GF | GA | GD | Pts | W | D | L | GF | GA | GD | W | D | L | GF | GA | GD |
|---|---|---|---|---|---|---|---|---|---|---|---|---|---|---|---|---|---|---|---|
| 38 | 19 | 10 | 9 | 57 | 33 | +24 | 67 | 11 | 4 | 4 | 35 | 18 | +17 | 8 | 6 | 5 | 22 | 15 | +7 |

Source: Competitive matches

==== Results by round ====
| Round | 1 | 2 | 3 | 4 | 5 | 6 | 7 | 8 | 9 | 10 | 11 | 12 | 13 | 14 | 15 | 16 | 17 | 18 | 19 | 20 | 21 | 22 | 23 | 24 | 25 | 26 | 27 | 28 | 29 | 30 | 31 | 32 | 33 | 34 | 35 | 36 | 37 | 38 |
|---|---|---|---|---|---|---|---|---|---|---|---|---|---|---|---|---|---|---|---|---|---|---|---|---|---|---|---|---|---|---|---|---|---|---|---|---|---|---|
| Ground | A | H | A | H | A | H | A | H | H | A | H | A | H | A | H | A | H | A | H | H | A | H | A | H | A | H | A | A | H | A | H | A | H | A | H | A | H | A |
| Result | D | D | W | W | D | W | D | W | W | L | W | L | L | D | W | W | D | D | L | W | D | D | W | L | W | W | W | L | L | W | W | L | W | W | W | L | L | W |
| Position | 11 | 13 | 8 | 6 | 6 | 4 | 5 | 5 | 4 | 5 | 3 | 4 | 6 | 5 | 4 | 4 | 5 | 6 | 6 | 6 | 6 | 6 | 6 | 6 | 6 | 6 | 6 | 6 | 6 | 5 | 5 | 5 | 5 | 5 | 5 | 5 | 5 | 5 |

Source: Competitive matches
A = Away; H = Home; W = Win; D = Draw; L = Loss

==== Matches ====
Win Draw Loss

| 20 August 2016 1 | Granada | 1–1 | Villarreal | Granada |
| 20:15 CEST (UTC+2) | Lombán (yellow card) 15'; Ponce 65'; Barral (yellow card) 69' | Report | Sansone (yellow card) 28'; N'Diaye (yellow card) 46'; Trigueros (yellow card) 53'; Castillejo 61' | Stadium: Los Cármenes; Attendance: 15,149; Referee: Xavier Estrada Fernández |

| 28 August 2016 2 | Villarreal | 0–0 | Sevilla | Villarreal |
| 22:15 CEST (UTC+2) | Soriano (yellow card) 48' | Report | Kolodziejczak (yellow card) 32'; Vitolo (yellow card) 49'; Sarabia (yellow card) 66' | Stadium: El Madrigal; Attendance: 17,530; Referee: Carlos del Cerro Grande |

| 10 September 2016 3 | Málaga | 0–2 | Villarreal | Málaga |
| 18:15 CEST (UTC+2) | Weligton (yellow card) 39'; Recio (yellow card) 66' | Report | Costa 33', (yellow card) 47'; Sansone 44' | Stadium: La Rosaleda; Attendance: 21,867; Referee: Alberto Undiano Mallenco |

| 18 September 2016 4 | Villarreal | 2–1 | Real Sociedad | Villarreal |
| 18:30 CEST (UTC+2) | Ruiz (yellow card) 13'; Sansone 22', 25'; Bruno (yellow card) 80' | Report | Rulli (yellow card) 15'; González (yellow card) 28'; Berchiche 35'; Zaldúa (yellow card) 45' (yellow-red card) 90+2'; Zurutuza (yellow card) 85' | Stadium: El Madrigal; Attendance: 18,692; Referee: Carlos Clos Gómez |

| 21 September 2016 5 | Real Madrid | 1–1 | Villarreal | Madrid |
| 20:00 CEST (UTC+2) | Ramos (yellow card) 45', (goal) 48'; Ronaldo (yellow card) 69'; Kroos (yellow card) 75'; Carvajal (yellow card) 90+4' | Report | Bruno 45+1' (pen.); José Ángel (yellow card) 52' | Stadium: Santiago Bernabéu; Attendance: 64,582; Referee: José González González |

| 25 September 2016 6 | Villarreal | 3–1 | Osasuna | Villarreal |
| 18:30 CEST (UTC+2) | Pato 5'; Bruno 24' (pen.); Sansone 39' | Report | Mario (yellow card) 23'; Torres 45+1' (pen.); Olavide (yellow card) 62' | Stadium: El Madrigal; Attendance: 17,679; Referee: Daniel Ocón Arráiz |

| 2 October 2016 7 | Espanyol | 0–0 | Villarreal | Barcelona |
| 18:30 CEST (UTC+2) | Sánchez (yellow card) 54'; Gerard (yellow card) 65' | Report | Musacchio (yellow card) 52'; Mario (yellow card) 90+3' | Stadium: Cornellà-El Prat; Attendance: 19,666; Referee: José Luis Munuera Montero |

| 16 October 2016 8 | Villarreal | 5–0 | Celta Vigo | Villarreal |
| 20:45 CEST (UTC+2) | Soriano 8', 12'; Bakambu 38'; Wass 48' (o.g.); Álvaro (yellow card) 56'; Trigueros 90+2' | Report | Gómez (yellow card) 13' (yellow-red card) 87'; Aspas (yellow card) 20'; Orellana (yellow card) 51'; Cheikh (yellow card) 54'; Wass (yellow card) 62' | Stadium: El Madrigal; Attendance: 18,152; Referee: Xavier Estrada Fernández |

| 23 October 2016 9 | Villarreal | 2–1 | Las Palmas | Villarreal |
| 18:30 CEST (UTC+2) | Bakambu (yellow card) 48', (goal) 90+2'; Soriano (yellow card) 56'; Sansone 64' (pen.) | Report | Boateng 31', (yellow card) 79'; Mesa (yellow card) 62'; Tyronne (yellow card) 87' | Stadium: El Madrigal; Attendance: 18,312; Referee: Santiago Jaime Latre |

| 30 October 2016 10 | Eibar | 2–1 | Villarreal | Eibar |
| 12:00 CET (UTC+1) | Enrich (yellow card) 20'; Pedro León (yellow card) 27', (goal) 80'; Ramis 80' | Report | Sansone (yellow card) 8'; Ruiz (yellow card) 13'; Bruno 41' (pen.); Castillejo (yellow card) 76' | Stadium: Ipurua; Attendance: 4,678; Referee: David Fernández Borbalán |

| 6 November 2016 11 | Villarreal | 2–0 | Real Betis | Villarreal |
| 18:30 CET (UTC+1) | Trigueros 22'; Soriano 53' | Report | Cejudo (yellow card) 72'; Martin (yellow card) 79' | Stadium: El Madrigal; Attendance: 18,826; Referee: Iñaki Vicandi Garrido |

| 20 November 2016 12 | Athletic Bilbao | 1–0 | Villarreal | Bilbao |
| 20:45 CET (UTC+1) | García 67' | Report | Sansone (yellow card) 17'; Costa (yellow card) 76' | Stadium: San Mamés; Attendance: 38,245; Referee: José María Sánchez Martínez |

| 27 November 2016 13 | Villarreal | 0–2 | Alavés | Villarreal |
| 12:00 CET (UTC+1) | Costa (yellow card) 12'; Bruno (yellow card) 22' | Report | Ibai 8'; Camarasa 17'; Torres (yellow card) 55'; Feddal (yellow card) 56'; Pantić (yellow card) 66' | Stadium: El Madrigal; Attendance: 15,629; Referee: Alberto Undiano Mallenco |

| 4 December 2016 14 | Leganés | 0–0 | Villarreal | Leganés |
| 18:30 CET (UTC+1) | Gabriel (yellow card) 17'; Ramos (yellow card) 30'; Alberto (yellow card) 41'; Timor (yellow card) 52'; Insua (yellow card) 52'; Bustinza (yellow card) 57' | Report | Costa (yellow card) 20'; Mario (yellow card) 36'; Soriano (yellow card) 65' | Stadium: Butarque; Attendance: 8,526; Referee: Mario Melero López |

| 12 December 2016 15 | Villarreal | 3–0 | Atlético Madrid | Villarreal |
| 20:45 CET (UTC+1) | Trigueros 28'; Dos Santos 38', (yellow card) 45'; Sansone (yellow card) 42'; Álvaro (yellow card) 85'; Soriano 90+3' | Report | Correa (yellow card) 45'; Gabi (yellow card) 67'; Saúl (yellow card) 85' | Stadium: El Madrigal; Attendance: – Referee: Alejandro Hernández Hernández |

| 18 December 2016 16 | Sporting Gijón | 1–3 | Villarreal | Gijón |
| 13:00 CET (UTC+1) | Amorebieta (yellow card) 55'; Cases (yellow card) 60'; Carmona 89' | Report | Dos Santos 12'; Sansone 19'; Soriano (yellow card) 40'; Pato 74' | Stadium: El Molinón; Attendance: 19,900; Referee: Iñaki Vicandi Garrido |

| 8 January 2017 17 | Villarreal | 1–1 | Barcelona | Villarreal |
| 20:45 CET (UTC+1) | Sansone 49', (yellow card) 78'; Costa (yellow card) 70' (yellow-red card) 90+4' | Report | S. Roberto (yellow card) 78'; Piqué (yellow card) 83'; Messi 90' | Stadium: La Cerámica; Attendance: 22,893; Referee: Ignacio Iglesias Villanueva |

| 14 January 2017 18 | Deportivo La Coruña | 0–0 | Villarreal | A Coruña |
| 20:45 CET (UTC+1) | | Report | Trigueros (yellow card) 79' | Stadium: Riazor; Attendance: 19,807; Referee: Daniel Ocón Arráiz |

| 21 January 2017 19 | Villarreal | 0–2 | Valencia | Villarreal |
| 20:45 CET (UTC+1) | Ruiz (yellow card) 49'; Costa (yellow card) 89' | Report | Pérez (yellow card) 33'; Soler 35'; Mina 42'; Garay (yellow card) 80' | Stadium: La Cerámica; Attendance: 17,615; Referee: José González González |

| 28 January 2017 20 | Villarreal | 2–0 | Granada | Villarreal |
| 13:00 CET (UTC+1) | Álvaro (yellow card) 37', (goal) 73'; Soriano (yellow card) 38'; Bruno 42'; José Ángel (yellow card) 88' | Report | Samper (yellow card) 48'; Gabriel Silva (yellow card) 75' | Stadium: La Cerámica; Attendance: 15,152; Referee: Ignacio Iglesias Villanueva |

| 5 February 2017 21 | Sevilla | 0–0 | Villarreal | Seville |
| 12:00 CET (UTC+1) | Nasri (yellow card) 25'; Mercado (yellow card) 44' | Report | Bruno (yellow card) 28'; Mario (yellow card) 50' | Stadium: Ramón Sánchez Pizjuán; Attendance: 33,401; Referee: Alberto Undiano Mallenco |

| 12 February 2017 22 | Villarreal | 1–1 | Málaga | Villarreal |
| 12:00 CET (UTC+1) | Bruno 62' (pen.); Soriano (red card) 71' | Report | Charles 14', (yellow card) 55'; Camacho (yellow card) 55'; Keko (yellow card) 58'; Demichelis (yellow card) 61'; Duda (yellow card) 81' | Stadium: La Cerámica; Attendance: 17,120; Referee: Iñaki Vicandi Garrido |

| 19 February 2017 23 | Real Sociedad | 0–1 | Villarreal | San Sebastián |
| 12:00 CET (UTC+1) | Prieto (yellow card) 56'; Navas (yellow card) 90+3' | Report | Cheryshev (yellow card) 29'; Mario (yellow card) 49'; Rodrigo (yellow card) 70'; Bruno (yellow card) 70'; Castillejo 90+4' | Stadium: Anoeta; Attendance: 21,649; Referee: Alejandro Hernández Hernández |

| 26 February 2017 24 | Villarreal | 2–3 | Real Madrid | Villarreal |
| 20:45 CET (UTC+1) | Trigueros 50'; Bakambu 56'; Soldado (yellow card) 73'; Bruno (yellow card) 73'; Álvaro (yellow card) 74'; Mario (yellow card) 90' | Report | Bale 64'; Ramos (yellow card) 73'; Ronaldo 74' (pen.); Morata 83'; Pepe (yellow card) 90+1' | Stadium: La Cerámica; Attendance: 21,415; Referee: Jesús Gil Manzano |

| 1 March 2017 25 | Osasuna | 1–4 | Villarreal | Pamplona |
| 19:30 CET (UTC+1) | Berenguer (yellow card) 25'; Torres 64' (pen.), (yellow card) 77'; León (yellow card) 78' | Report | Soriano 2', (yellow card) 72'; Soldado (yellow card) 26', (goal) 27'; Rukavina (yellow card) 36'; Santos Borré 74', 78' | Stadium: El Sadar; Attendance: 13,409; Referee: José González González |

| 4 March 2017 26 | Villarreal | 2–0 | Espanyol | Villarreal |
| 18:30 CET (UTC+1) | Costa (yellow card) 3'; Soriano 45'; Álvaro (yellow card) 54'; Diego López 80' (o.g.) | Report | Diego López (yellow card) 28'; Ó. Duarte (yellow card) 66' | Stadium: La Cerámica; Attendance: 17,315; Referee: Ricardo de Burgos Bengoetxea |

| 12 March 2017 27 | Celta Vigo | 0–1 | Villarreal | Vigo |
| 18:30 CET (UTC+1) | Mallo (yellow card) 14'; Aspas (yellow card) 90'; Planas (yellow card) 90'; Bongonda (yellow card) 90+1' | Report | Soldado (yellow card) 8', (goal) 45'; Fernández (yellow card) 72'; Costa (yellow card) 73'; Dos Santos (yellow card) 85'; Musacchio (yellow card) 87' | Stadium: Balaídos; Attendance: 16,651; Referee: Mario Melero López |

| 19 March 2017 28 | Las Palmas | 1–0 | Villarreal | Las Palmas |
| 20:45 CET (UTC+1) | Boateng 10'; Viera (yellow card) 70'; Lemos (yellow card) 74'; Lizoain (yellow card) 90+3' | Report | Ruiz (red card) 19'; Sansone (yellow card) 23'; Costa (yellow card) 76' | Stadium: Gran Canaria; Attendance: 18,717; Referee: Iñaki Vicandi Garrido |

| 1 April 2017 29 | Villarreal | 2–3 | Eibar | Villarreal |
| 13:00 CEST (UTC+2) | Bonera (yellow card) 10'; Soriano 18', 89'; Castillejo (yellow card) 39'; Álvaro (yellow card) 66'; Soldado (yellow card) 90+1' | Report | Luna (yellow card) 43'; Pedro León 48' (pen.); Kike 54', (yellow card) 68'; Inui (yellow card) 62', (goal) 77' | Stadium: La Cerámica; Attendance: 15,574; Referee: Daniel Ocón Arráiz |

| 5 April 2017 30 | Real Betis | 0–1 | Villarreal | Seville |
| 21:30 CEST (UTC+2) | Brašanac (yellow card) 39'; Durmisi (yellow card) 73' | Report | Adrián 47'; Ruiz (yellow card) 66'; Dos Santos (yellow card) 70' | Stadium: Benito Villamarín; Attendance: 25,392; Referee: Jesús Gil Manzano |

| 9 April 2017 31 | Villarreal | 3–1 | Athletic Bilbao | Villarreal |
| 20:45 CEST (UTC+2) | Ruiz 17', (red card) 74'; Bakambu 47', (yellow card) 53'; Soriano (yellow card) 53'; Adrián 58'; Mario (yellow card) 64'; Soldado (yellow card) 74'; Fernández (yellow card) 90+2'; Sansone (yellow card) 90+4' | Report | Laporte 20', (yellow card) 25'; Beñat (yellow card) 22'; Iraizoz (yellow card) 76' | Stadium: La Cerámica; Attendance: 17,948; Referee: Daniel Trujillo Suárez |

| 17 April 2017 32 | Alavés | 2–1 | Villarreal | Vitoria-Gasteiz |
| 20:45 CEST (UTC+2) | Ibai 35'; Ely 45'; Toquero (yellow card) 61'; Hernandez (yellow card) 90+2' | Report | Bakambu (yellow card) 26', (goal) 70'; Musacchio (yellow card) 44'; Soriano (yellow card) 66'; Costa (yellow card) 90+2' | Stadium: Mendizorrotza; Attendance: 17,831; Referee: Alfonso Álvarez Izquierdo |

| 22 April 2017 33 | Villarreal | 2–1 | Leganés | Villarreal |
| 16:15 CEST (UTC+2) | Musacchio (yellow card) 65'; Bakambu 68', 90+2' | Report | Bustinza (yellow card) 73'; Morán (yellow card) 84'; Guerrero 90'; Siovas (yellow card) 90+3' | Stadium: La Cerámica; Attendance: 16,829; Referee: Santiago Jaime Latre |

| 26 April 2017 34 | Atlético Madrid | 0–1 | Villarreal | Madrid |
| 21:30 CEST (UTC+2) | Gabi (yellow card) 55'; Godín (yellow card) 90+1' | Report | Trigueros (yellow card) 58'; Rukavina (yellow card) 66'; Soldado (yellow card) 74'; Soriano 82'; Musacchio (yellow card) 88'; Costa (yellow card) 89'; Bakambu (yellow card) 90+4' | Stadium: Vicente Calderón; Attendance: 44,432; Referee: Ignacio Iglesias Villanueva |

| 28 April 2017 35 | Villarreal | 3–1 | Sporting Gijón | Villarreal |
| 20:45 CEST (UTC+2) | Soldado 33'; Bakambu 47', 59'; Dos Santos (yellow card) 64'; Bonera (yellow card) 84' | Report | Amorebieta (yellow card) 35'; Douglas 73' | Stadium: La Cerámica; Attendance: 15,120; Referee: Xavier Estrada Fernández |

| 6 May 2017 36 | Barcelona | 4–1 | Villarreal | Barcelona |
| 18:30 CEST (UTC+2) | Roberto (yellow card) 16'; Neymar 21'; Messi 45', 82' (pen.); Iniesta (yellow card) 64'; L. Suárez 69' | Report | Álvaro (yellow card) 19'; Bakambu 32'; Soldado (yellow card) 72'; Musacchio (yellow card) 77'; Costa (yellow card) 81' | Stadium: Camp Nou; Attendance: 90,463; Referee: José María Sánchez Martínez |

| 14 May 2017 37 | Villarreal | 0–0 | Deportivo La Coruña | Villarreal |
| 20:00 CEST (UTC+2) | Trigueros (yellow card) 43'; Soldado (yellow card) 45+1' | Summary | Lux (yellow card) 45+1'; Andone (yellow card) 53'; Fajr (yellow card) 64'; Borges (yellow card) 90+4' | Stadium: La Cerámica; Attendance: 16,071; Referee: Jesús Gil Manzano |

| 21 May 2017 38 | Valencia | 1–3 | Villarreal | Valencia |
| 16:45 CEST (UTC+2) | Zaza (yellow card) 34'; Nani 54'; Parejo (yellow card) 71' | Summary | Soldado 1'; Costa (yellow card) 4'; Trigueros 58'; Bakambu (yellow card) 67'; Sansone 88' | Stadium: Mestalla; Attendance: 33,659; Referee: David Fernández Borbalán |

=== Copa del Rey ===
==== Round of 32 ====
| 30 November 2016 First leg | Toledo | 0–3 | Villarreal | Toledo |
| 19:00 CET (UTC+1) | De Lerma (yellow card) 35'; González (yellow card) 52' | Report | Jiménez 15' (o.g.); Bakambu 20'; Álvaro (yellow card) 58'; Castillejo 81' | Stadium: Salto del Caballo; Attendance: 3,900; Referee: Xavier Estrada Fernández |

| 21 December 2016 Second leg | Villarreal | 1–1 (4–1 agg.) | Toledo | Villarreal |
| --:-- CET (UTC+1) | Pato 60' | Report | Villa 57' | Stadium: El Madrigal; Attendance: 12,157; Referee: Alfonso Álvarez Izquierdo |

==== Round of 16 ====
| 4 January 2017 First leg | Real Sociedad | 3–1 | Villarreal | San Sebastián |
| 19:00 CET (UTC+1) | Willian José 17', (yellow card) 65'; Vela 33'; Oyarzabal 72'; I. Martínez (yellow card) 90+1' | Report | Trigueros 77'; José Ángel (yellow card) 87'; Castillejo (yellow card) 90+1'; Soriano (yellow card) 90+4' | Stadium: Anoeta; Attendance: 16,414; Referee: Carlos Clos Gómez |

| 11 January 2017 Second leg | Villarreal | 1–1 (2–4 agg.) | Real Sociedad | Villarreal |
| 19:00 CET (UTC+1) | Castillejo (yellow card) 21'; Santos Borré (yellow card) 34'; Soriano 45'; Ruiz (yellow card) 70'; Sansone (red card) 89' | Report | Oyarzabal 15'; Willian José (yellow card) 18'; Juanmi (yellow card) 70'; Illarramendi (yellow card) 86'; Gaztañaga (yellow card) 90+3' | Stadium: La Cerámica; Attendance: 14,298; Referee: David Fernández Borbalán |

=== UEFA Champions League ===
==== Play-off ====
| 17 August 2016 First leg | Villarreal (Spain) | 1–2 | (France) Monaco | Villarreal, Spain |
| 20:45 CEST (UTC+2) | N'Diaye (yellow card) 3'; Pato 36' | Report | Fabinho 3', (yellow card) 75'; Lemar (yellow card) 6'; Silva 72'; Mendy (yellow card) 86' (yellow-red card) 86'; Bakayoko (yellow card) 86'; Moutinho (yellow card) 90' | Stadium: El Madrigal; Attendance: 19,516; Referee: Felix Brych (Germany) |

| 23 August 2016 Second leg | Monaco (France) | 1–0 (3–1 agg.) | (Spain) Villarreal | Fontvieille, Monaco |
| 20:45 CEST (UTC+2) | Sidibé (yellow card) 25'; Fabinho 90+1' (pen.) | Report | Musacchio (yellow card) 83' | Stadium: Stade Louis II; Attendance: 8,750; Referee: Jonas Eriksson (Sweden) |

=== UEFA Europa League ===
==== Group stage ====
| Pos | Team | Pld | W | D | L | GF | GA | GD | Pts | Qualification |
|---|---|---|---|---|---|---|---|---|---|---|
| 1 | (Turkey) Osmanlıspor | 6 | 3 | 1 | 2 | 10 | 7 | +3 | 10 | Advance to knockout phase |
| 2 | (Spain) Villarreal | 6 | 2 | 3 | 1 | 9 | 8 | +1 | 9 | Advance to knockout phase |
| 3 | (Switzerland) Zürich | 6 | 1 | 3 | 2 | 5 | 7 | −2 | 6 | |
| 4 | (Romania) Steaua București | 6 | 1 | 3 | 2 | 5 | 7 | −2 | 6 | |

Source: UEFA
Rules for classification: Group stage tiebreakers

| 15 September 2016 1 | Villarreal (Spain) | 2–1 | (Switzerland) Zürich | Villarreal, Spain |
| 21:05 CEST (UTC+2) | Pato 28'; Dos Santos (yellow card) 21', (goal) 45+1' | Report | Sadiku 2'; Voser (yellow card) 22'; Winter (yellow card) 51'; Kukeli (yellow card) 65'; Kecojević (yellow card) 86'; Nef (yellow card) 90+3' | Stadium: El Madrigal; Attendance: 16,384; Referee: Sébastien Delferière (Belgium) |

| 29 September 2016 2 | Steaua București (Romania) | 1–1 | (Spain) Villarreal | Bucharest, Romania |
| 19:00 CEST (UTC+2) | Sulley 19' | Report | Santos Borré 9', (yellow card) 55'; Rukavina (yellow card) 74'; N'Diaye (yellow card) 76' | Stadium: Arena Națională; Attendance: 13,231; Referee: Yevhen Aranovsky (Ukraine) |

| 20 October 2016 3 | Osmanlıspor (Turkey) | 2–2 | (Spain) Villarreal | Ankara, Turkey |
| 19:00 CEST (UTC+2) | Rusescu 23', 24'; Güven (red card) 53'; Demir (yellow card) 90' | Report | Santos Borré (yellow card) 45'; Castillejo (yellow card) 45+2'; N'Diaye 56'; Pato 74'; Álvaro (yellow card) 83' | Stadium: Osmanlı Stadyumu; Attendance: 11,692; Referee: Liran Liany (Israel) |

| 3 November 2016 4 | Villarreal (Spain) | 1–2 | (Turkey) Osmanlıspor | Villarreal, Spain |
| 21:05 CET (UTC+1) | Rodri 48' | Report | Webó 8'; Rusescu 75' | Stadium: El Madrigal; Attendance: 15,386; Referee: Harald Lechner (Austria) |

| 24 November 2016 5 | Zürich (Switzerland) | 1–1 | (Spain) Villarreal | Zürich, Switzerland |
| 19:00 CET (UTC+1) | Brunner (yellow card) 31'; Rodríguez 87' (pen.); Marchesano (yellow card) 90+1' | Report | Bruno 14'; Ruiz (yellow card) 23'; Rukavina (yellow card) 90'; Musacchio (yellow card) 90+2' | Stadium: Letzigrund; Attendance: 6,020; Referee: Davide Massa (Italy) |

| 8 December 2016 6 | Villarreal (Spain) | 2–1 | (Romania) Steaua București | Villarreal, Spain |
| 21:05 CET (UTC+1) | Sansone 16'; Bakambu (yellow card) 27'; Dos Santos (yellow card) 68'; Trigueros 88' | Report | Tamaș (yellow card) 32' (yellow-red card) 79'; Enache (yellow card) 25'; Achim 55', (yellow card) 90+1'; Golubović (yellow card) 68' | Stadium: El Madrigal; Attendance: 19,471; Referee: Manuel Gräfe (Germany) |

==== Knockout phase ====
===== Round of 32 =====
| 16 February 2017 First leg | Villarreal (Spain) | 0–4 | (Italy) Roma | Villarreal, Spain |
| 21:05 CET (UTC+1) | Mario (yellow card) 44' | Report | Emerson 32'; Džeko 65', 79', 86'; Peres (yellow card) 89' | Stadium: La Cerámica; Attendance: 17,960; Referee: Danny Makkelie (Netherlands) |

| 23 February 2017 Second leg | Roma (Italy) | 0–1 (4–1 agg.) | (Spain) Villarreal | Rome, Italy |
| 19:00 CET (UTC+1) | Rüdiger (yellow card) 57' (yellow-red card) 81' | Report | Santos Borré 15'; Hernández (yellow card) 22' | Stadium: Stadio Olimpico; Attendance: 19,495; Referee: Felix Zwayer (Germany) |

== Statistics ==
=== Appearances and goals ===
Last updated on 21 May 2017

| No. | Pos | Nat | Player | Total | | La Liga | | Copa del Rey | | Champions League | | Europa League | |
| No. | Pos | Nat | Player | Apps | Goals | Apps | Goals | Apps | Goals | Apps | Goals | Apps | Goals |
Goalkeepers
| 1 | GK | (Spain) ESP | Sergio Asenjo | 31 | 0 | 24 | 0 | 2 | 0 | 2 | 0 | 3 | 0 |
| 13 | GK | (Spain) ESP | Andrés Fernández | 20 | 0 | 14+1 | 0 | 0 | 0 | 0 | 0 | 5 | 0 |
| 25 | GK | (Argentina) ARG | Mariano Barbosa | 2 | 0 | 0 | 0 | 2 | 0 | 0 | 0 | 0 | 0 |
Defenders
| 2 | DF | (Spain) ESP | Mario Gaspar | 43 | 0 | 36 | 0 | 2+1 | 0 | 2 | 0 | 2 | 0 |
| 3 | DF | (Spain) ESP | José Ángel | 18 | 0 | 7 | 0 | 3 | 0 | 2 | 0 | 6 | 0 |
| 5 | DF | (Argentina) ARG | Mateo Musacchio | 30 | 0 | 23 | 0 | 1 | 0 | 2 | 0 | 4 | 0 |
| 6 | DF | (Spain) ESP | Víctor Ruiz | 36 | 1 | 27+1 | 1 | 2 | 0 | 1 | 0 | 5 | 0 |
| 11 | DF | (Spain) ESP | Jaume Costa | 35 | 1 | 30+1 | 1 | 1 | 0 | 0+1 | 0 | 2 | 0 |
| 12 | DF | (Spain) ESP | Álvaro | 32 | 1 | 20+3 | 1 | 4 | 0 | 0 | 0 | 4+1 | 0 |
| 22 | DF | (Serbia) SRB | Antonio Rukavina | 12 | 0 | 3+1 | 0 | 2 | 0 | 0 | 0 | 6 | 0 |
| 23 | DF | (Italy) ITA | Daniele Bonera | 10 | 0 | 6 | 0 | 1 | 0 | 0 | 0 | 3 | 0 |
| 47 | DF | (Spain) ESP | Pau Torres | 1 | 0 | 0 | 0 | 0+1 | 0 | 0 | 0 | 0 | 0 |
Midfielders
| 7 | MF | (Russia) RUS | Denis Cheryshev | 18 | 0 | 2+9 | 0 | 1 | 0 | 0 | 0 | 5+1 | 0 |
| 8 | MF | (Mexico) MEX | Jonathan dos Santos | 29 | 3 | 12+5 | 2 | 3+1 | 0 | 0 | 0 | 7+1 | 1 |
| 14 | MF | (Spain) ESP | Manu Trigueros | 22 | 7 | 2+12 | 5 | 2+1 | 1 | 2 | 0 | 3 | 1 |
| 16 | MF | (Spain) ESP | Rodri | 31 | 1 | 8+15 | 0 | 4 | 0 | 0 | 0 | 2+2 | 1 |
| 19 | MF | (Spain) ESP | Samu Castillejo | 44 | 3 | 24+9 | 2 | 1+2 | 1 | 2 | 0 | 2+4 | 0 |
| 20 | MF | (Italy) ITA | Roberto Soriano | 43 | 10 | 31+2 | 9 | 3 | 1 | 2 | 0 | 2+3 | 0 |
| 21 | MF | (Spain) ESP | Bruno | 45 | 6 | 33+1 | 5 | 1 | 0 | 2 | 0 | 8 | 1 |
| 29 | MF | (Argentina) ARG | Leonardo Suárez | 5 | 0 | 0+3 | 0 | 0+1 | 0 | 0+1 | 0 | 0 | 0 |
Forwards
| 9 | FW | (Spain) ESP | Roberto Soldado | 11 | 4 | 10 | 4 | 0 | 0 | 0 | 0 | 1 | 0 |
| 15 | FW | (Spain) ESP | Adrián | 17 | 2 | 7+8 | 2 | 0 | 0 | 0 | 0 | 0+2 | 0 |
| 17 | FW | (Democratic Republic of the Congo) COD | Cédric Bakambu | 34 | 12 | 17+9 | 11 | 1 | 1 | 0 | 0 | 4+3 | 0 |
| 18 | FW | (Italy) ITA | Nicola Sansone | 42 | 9 | 25+7 | 8 | 2+2 | 0 | 0 | 0 | 2+4 | 1 |
| 24 | FW | (Colombia) COL | Rafael Santos Borré | 30 | 4 | 2+15 | 2 | 3+1 | 0 | 2 | 0 | 5+2 | 2 |
| 27 | FW | (Spain) ESP | Aitor Cantalapiedra | 1 | 0 | 0+1 | 0 | 0 | 0 | 0 | 0 | 0 | 0 |
| 39 | FW | (Spain) ESP | Mario González Gutiérrez | 3 | 0 | 0+2 | 0 | 0 | 0 | 0+1 | 0 | 0 | 0 |
Players who have made an appearance or had a squad number this season but have left the club
| 4 | MF | (Senegal) SEN | Alfred N'Diaye | 13 | 1 | 1+6 | 0 | 1 | 0 | 1+1 | 0 | 3 | 1 |
| 10 | FW | (Brazil) BRA | Alexandre Pato | 24 | 6 | 11+3 | 2 | 2+1 | 1 | 2 | 1 | 4+1 | 2 |

== Kits ==
| Home | Home alt | Away | Third |
