= Samu Castillejo =

Spanish footballer (born 1995)

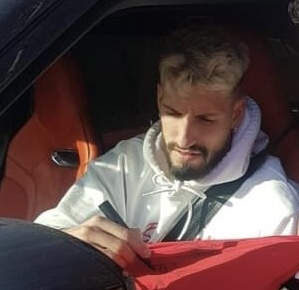
- Castillejo in 2020

Personal information
- Full name: Samuel Castillejo Azuaga
- Date of birth: 18 January 1995 (age 31)
- Place of birth: Barcelona, Spain
- Height: 1.82 m (6 ft 0 in)
- Position: Winger

Youth career
- 2004–2006: Explanada FS
- 2006–2007: UD Mortadelo
- 2007–2012: Málaga

Senior career*
Years	Team	Apps	(Gls)
2011–2014	Málaga B	75	(22)
2014–2015	Málaga	34	(1)
2015–2018	Villarreal	91	(9)
2018–2022	AC Milan	86	(7)
2022–2024	Valencia	25	(4)
2023–2024	→ Sassuolo (loan)	17	(0)
2025–2026	Johor Darul Ta'zim	3	(0)
Total		331	(43)

International career
2011	Spain U16	6	(2)
2011–2012	Spain U17	9	(0)
2015	Spain U21	4	(0)
- * Club domestic league appearances and goals

Samuel "Samu" Castillejo Azuaga (born 18 January 1995) is a Spanish former professional footballer who played as a winger.

== Club career ==
=== Málaga ===
Castillejo was born in Barcelona, Catalonia where his father, a Guardia Civil officer, was stationed at the time; the family resettled in Málaga, Andalusia within a few months. He graduated from Málaga's youth system, made his senior debut with the reserves in 2011 aged only 16, and went on to play three full seasons in the Tercera División. He was given the nickname El Fideo ("the noodle" in Spanish), due to his "wiry frame and ability to squirm away in tight spaces".

In June 2014, Castillejo was called up by first-team manager Javi Gracia for the pre-season. He was named player of the match in a 3–1 friendly win against Newcastle United where he scored twice. He was promoted to the main squad the following month.

Castillejo made his debut with the first team on 29 August 2014, coming on as a substitute for fellow youth graduate Juanmi in the 57th minute of a 3–0 La Liga away loss to Valencia. He scored his first professional goal on 2 February, the winner in a home victory over the same opposition.

=== Villarreal ===
Castillejo joined Villarreal on 18 June 2015 alongside his Málaga teammate Samu García, signing a five-year deal. He scored six times in his third season, helping his team to qualify for the UEFA Europa League after a fifth-place finish.

=== AC Milan ===
Castillejo signed with AC Milan on 17 August 2018, with Carlos Bacca moving in the opposite direction. He made his Serie A debut on 31 August, starting in the 2–1 victory over Roma at the San Siro. He scored his first goal for the club on 30 September, in a 4–1 away defeat of Sassuolo.

During the summer 2021 transfer window, following a lacklustre season, Castillejo was a priority sale; despite a number of offers, he and his agent failed to agree on a particular one. He was omitted from a 25-player squad list for the UEFA Champions League.

=== Valencia ===
On 12 July 2022, Castillejo signed a three-year contract with Valencia. He scored his first goal for the side on 4 September, the third in an eventual 5–1 home win over Getafe.

On 1 September 2023, the last day of the summer transfer window, Castillejo moved to Sassuolo on loan with an option to buy. In August 2024, he was fired by Valencia after failing to reach a mutual agreement to terminate his contract.

=== Later career ===
On 27 February 2025, Castillejo joined Johor Darul Ta'zim of the Malaysian Super League. He announced his retirement in October 2026, aged 31.

== Style of play ==
Castillejo plays mainly as a winger on either side of the pitch, although he relies mostly on his stronger left foot. He also plays occasionally as a supporting striker or a false 9.

== Personal life ==
In June 2020, Castillejo was robbed of his watch at gunpoint in Milan. On 1 November 2024 his 28-year-old brother José, who played youth football for Valencia, was confirmed a casualty in the Spain floods.

== Career statistics ==
As of match played 1 April 2024

Appearances and goals by club, season and competition
Club	Season	League			Cup		Continental		Other		Total	
Club	Season	Division	Apps	Goals	Apps	Goals	Apps	Goals	Apps	Goals	Apps	Goals
Málaga	2014–15	La Liga	34	1	5	0	—		—		39	1
Villarreal	2015–16	La Liga	28	1	4	0	13 (Note: Appearances in UEFA Europa League)	1	—		45	2
Villarreal	2016–17	La Liga	33	2	3	1	8 (Note: Two appearances in UEFA Champions League, six appearances in UEFA Europa League)	0	—		44	3
Villarreal	2017–18	La Liga	30	6	3	0	5	0	—		38	6
Villarreal	Total		91	9	10	1	26	1	0	0	127	12
AC Milan	2018–19	Serie A	31	4	4	0	4	0	1 (Note: Appearance in Supercoppa Italiana)	0	40	4
AC Milan	2019–20	Serie A	22	2	3	1	—		—		25	3
AC Milan	2020–21	Serie A	28	1	2	0	13	2	—		43	3
AC Milan	2021–22	Serie A	5	0	0	0	0	0	—		5	0
AC Milan	Total		86	7	9	1	17	2	1	0	113	10
Valencia	2022–23	La Liga	25	4	1	0	—		0	0	26	4
Sassuolo (loan)	2023–24	Serie A	17	0	2	0	—		—		19	0
Career total			253	21	27	2	43	3	1	0	324	26

== Honours ==
AC Milan

- Serie A: 2021–22
