= Cristian Tissone =

Argentine footballer (born 1988)

Personal information
- Full name: Cristian Hernán Tissone
- Date of birth: 8 February 1988 (age 38)
- Place of birth: Quilmes, Argentina
- Height: 1.88 m (6 ft 2 in)
- Position: Centre-back

Youth career
- 2006–2008: Atalanta

Senior career*
Years	Team	Apps	(Gls)
2005–2006	Tamai		
2008–2009	Atalanta Primavera		
2009–2010	Pro Sesto	15	(0)
2010–2011	Atalanta Primavera		
2011–2012	Mallorca B		
2012–2013	Olot		
2013	Honka	0	(0)
2013–2014	Málaga B	7	(0)
2014–2015	Anadia	13	(2)
2015–2016	Vitória Setúbal	0	(0)
2016–2017	Anadia	5	(0)
2017–2018	Carmelita	8	(0)
2018–	Mirandela	1	(0)
- * Club domestic league appearances and goals as of 1 October 2018

Cristian Hernán Tissone (born 8 February 1988) is an Argentine professional footballer who plays for Portuguese club Mirandela as a centre-back.

In the summer of 2015, Tissone signed for Portuguese side Vitória de Setúbal on a two-year contract.

He is the younger brother of Málaga CF player Fernando Tissone.

Tissone holds an Italian passport, and is also eligible for Cape Verdean citizenship due to his grandfather.
