= Samu García =

Spanish footballer

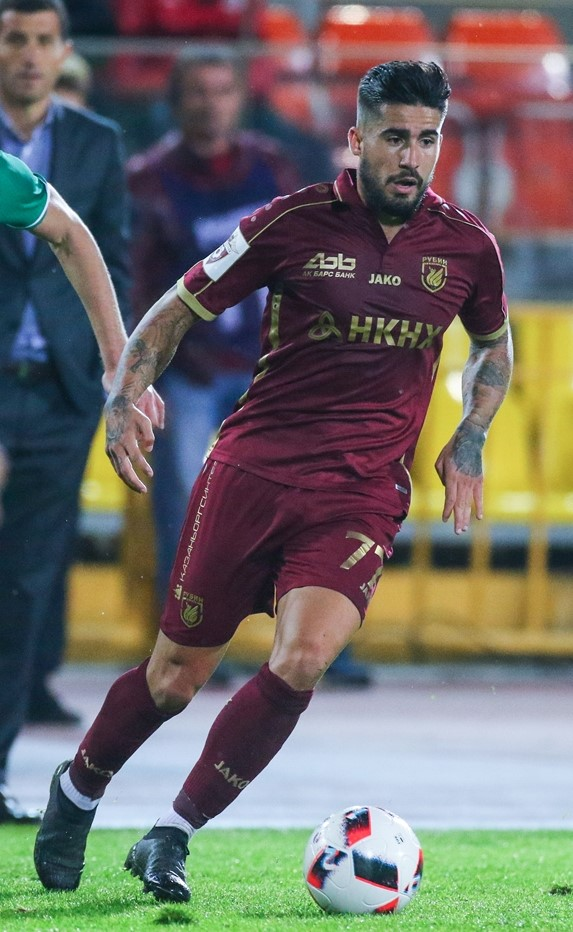
- García playing for Rubin in 2016

Personal information
- Full name: Samuel García Sánchez
- Date of birth: 13 July 1990 (age 36)
- Place of birth: Málaga, Spain
- Height: 1.79 m (5 ft 10 in)
- Positions: Winger; forward

Youth career
- Puerta Blanca
- Conejito
- 2004: Rangers
- 2004: Chelsea
- Conejito
- Goyu-Ryu

Senior career*
Years	Team	Apps	(Gls)
2008–2009	San Andrés	28	(6)
2009–2010	Alhaurino	26	(9)
2010–2013	Málaga B	92	(21)
2013−2015	Málaga	59	(9)
2015−2016	Villarreal	16	(2)
2016–2017	Rubin Kazan	13	(0)
2017	→ Leganés (loan)	11	(0)
2017–2019	Levante	11	(0)
2018	→ Málaga (loan)	7	(0)
Total		263	(47)
- * Club domestic league appearances and goals

Samuel "Samu" García Sánchez (born 13 July 1990) is a Spanish former professional footballer who played as a right winger or a forward.

He totalled 104 games and 11 goals in La Liga over five seasons, representing Málaga (two stints), Villarreal, Leganés and Levante. He also played in Russia with Rubin Kazan.

== Club career ==
Born in Málaga, Andalusia, García played his first years as a senior with UD Dos Hermanas San Andrés and Tercera División team CD Alhaurino, before joining Málaga CF's reserves in 2010 and going on to compete several seasons at that level with the club. In 2004, at the age of 14, he was signed by Chelsea in the Premier League, but returned to his hometown after only three months after failing to adjust.

In the summer of 2013, García was called to the first team by newly appointed manager Bernd Schuster. He signed his first professional contract shortly after, keeping him at the La Rosaleda Stadium until June 2016.

García made his official debut with Málaga's main squad on 17 August 2013, coming on as a second-half substitute in a 1−0 La Liga away loss against Valencia CF. He scored his first goal on 3 November, playing less than ten minutes and netting in the 93rd minute of a 3−2 derby home win over Real Betis.

Both García and his Málaga teammate Samu Castillejo joined Villarreal CF on 18 June 2015, signing a five-year deal. On 30 June of the following year, the former transferred to Russian Premier League club FC Rubin Kazan alongside coach Javi Gracia.

On 19 January 2017, García joined CD Leganés on loan until the end of the top-flight season. On 24 August, he signed a three-year contract with Levante UD in the same league but, the following transfer window, returned to Málaga on a five-month loan.

García left Levante on 14 January 2019. In December 2020, he revealed in his Instagram account that he had already decided to retire previous to that.
