= Juanmi (footballer, born 1993) =

Spanish footballer

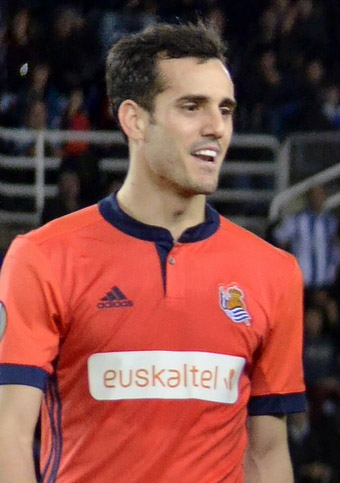
- Juanmi with Real Sociedad in 2018

Personal information
- Full name: Juan Miguel Jiménez López
- Date of birth: 20 May 1993 (age 33)
- Place of birth: Coín, Spain
- Height: 1.72 m (5 ft 8 in)
- Position: Forward

Team information
- Current team: Getafe
- Number: 7

Youth career
- Atlético Coín
- 2008–2010: Málaga

Senior career*
Years	Team	Apps	(Gls)
2009–2011	Málaga B	22	(1)
2010–2015	Málaga	85	(18)
2013	→ Racing Santander (loan)	19	(0)
2015–2016	Southampton	12	(0)
2016–2019	Real Sociedad	95	(24)
2019–2025	Betis	90	(23)
2023–2024	→ Al-Riyadh (loan)	16	(1)
2024	→ Cádiz (loan)	16	(3)
2025	→ Getafe (loan)	13	(0)
2025–	Getafe	8	(1)

International career
2009–2010	Spain U17	6	(5)
2011	Spain U18	3	(2)
2011–2012	Spain U19	19	(8)
2015	Spain	1	(0)
2016	Andalusia	1	(0)
- * Club domestic league appearances and goals as of 26 May 2026

Juan Miguel Jiménez López (Spanish pronunciation: [ˈxwam miˈɣel xiˈmeneθ ˈlopeθ]; born 20 May 1993), known as Juanmi [ˈxwammi], is a Spanish professional footballer who plays for as a forward for La Liga club Getafe.

He came through the youth ranks at Málaga, starting in its reserves and making his first-team debut in 2010, also spending time on loan at Racing de Santander in 2013. In La Liga, he also represented Real Sociedad, Betis, Cádiz and Getafe, totalling over 300 games and 60 goals and winning the Copa del Rey in 2022. He spent one season in the Premier League with Southampton, and another in the Saudi Pro League with Al-Riyadh.

Juanmi won the European Championship with Spain under-19s in 2011 and 2012, and made his senior international debut in 2015.

== Club career ==
=== Málaga ===
Juanmi was born in Coín, Province of Málaga. Raised in Málaga's youth academy, he made his first-team debut on 13 January 2010 in a Copa del Rey away match against Getafe, scoring as the Andalusians were crushed 5–1 (losing 6–3 on aggregate), which made him the club's youngest ever goalscorer in an official game at the age of only 16. Four days later, he first appeared in La Liga, playing eight minutes in a 1–0 home win over the same opponent.

On 27 March 2010, Juanmi assisted Apoño's goal in a 1–1 home draw against Tenerife. Although Málaga were threatened with relegation until the last day of the season, he still was able to make five first-team appearances, totalling 110 minutes. He signed his first professional contract on 5 August, keeping him with the club until the end of 2014–15.

On 12 September 2010, the 17-year-old Juanmi started at Real Zaragoza, scoring twice as Málaga led 5–0 at the 30-minute mark (eventually winning 5–3). By doing this, he became the youngest player in the competition's history to achieve this feat in only one game.

After the summer of 2011 signing of Ruud van Nistelrooy, Juanmi was further demoted down Málaga's attacking pecking order. He made his first appearance of the season on 11 December 2011, coming on as a substitute and scoring in a 1–1 home draw with Osasuna. He started at Getafe in the Spanish Cup two days later, and scored the game's only goal in the 84th minute.

On 15 January 2013, after featuring even more rarely, Juanmi was loaned to Segunda División's Racing de Santander until June. He failed to find the net during his short spell, and his team also suffered relegation.

Juanmi was given more playing time by new Málaga manager Bernd Schuster in 2013–14, and was made a starter by Javi Gracia in the following campaign. On 31 January 2015, he was definitely promoted to the main squad, being handed the number 11 jersey.

=== Southampton ===
On 16 June 2015, Juanmi signed a four-year deal with Premier League side Southampton, for an undisclosed fee reported to be £5 million. He made his debut on 30 July, coming on for Jordy Clasie in the 62nd minute and setting up fellow substitute Shane Long for the final goal in a 3–0 victory over Vitesse at St. Mary's Stadium in the third qualifying round of the UEFA Europa League.

=== Real Sociedad ===
On 9 June 2016, after 19 goalless appearances in all competitions – two starts – Juanmi returned to his home country and joined Real Sociedad for an undisclosed fee. He made his competitive debut on 21 August, starting as they began the season with a 3–0 home loss to Real Madrid. Six days later, he scored his first goal to open a 2–0 win at Osasuna.

Juanmi was given a yellow card on 28 February 2017 for celebrating the opening goal of a 2–2 draw with Eibar at the Anoeta Stadium by lifting up his shirt to show a tribute to the recently deceased leukemia sufferer Pablo Ráez, and was sent off in the second half for a second booking.

=== Betis ===
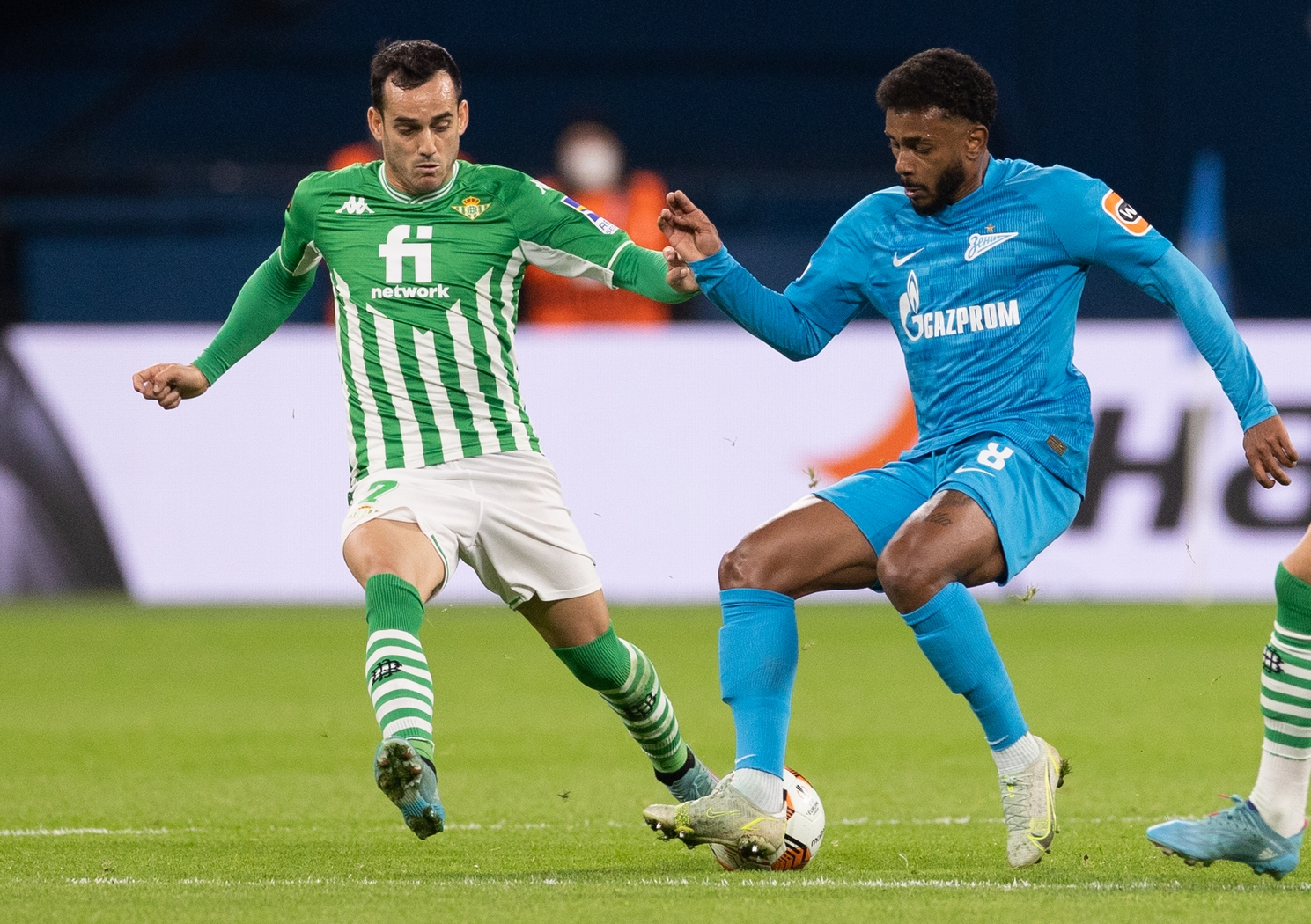
Juanmi (left) playing for Betis against Zenit in the Europa League in 2022

On 14 June 2019, Juanmi signed a five-year contract with Real Betis for a €8 million fee. He spent the vast majority of his debut campaign on the sidelines, nursing a left-foot injury.

Juanmi scored his first competitive goal on 28 June 2020, but in a 4–2 away defeat against Levante. On 28 November 2021, against the same opposition but at home, his second-half hat-trick proved crucial to the 3–1 victory. He played in the team's cup final win over Valencia five months later, having scored twice away to his previous club in a 4–0 quarter-final win on 3 February. He concluded the 2021–22 season with a career-best 20 goals in all competitions, of which 16 in the league, where he was joint fifth top scorer.

On 8 September 2022, Juanmi suffered a left-ankle ligament break in a Europa League group game at HJK. He returned to action in December in friendly matches during the FIFA World Cup, and was fully recovered from setbacks by the end of January.

Having fallen out of favour with Manuel Pellegrini following the signing of Ayoze Pérez, Juanmi joined newly promoted Saudi Pro League side Al-Riyadh on a one-year loan on 20 August 2023. He scored his only goal on 5 October, in a 2–2 home draw with Al Shabab; this broke his eight-month drought. The following February, he returned to Spain and its top tier after agreeing to a loan deal with Cádiz until June. He netted in each half of a victory against Atlético Madrid on 9 March, ending a 23-match winless run.

After returning to Betis, still under the same manager, Juanmi continue to feature sparingly; he did score a last-minute goal to help the hosts defeat Celje 2–1 in the league phase of the UEFA Conference League.

=== Getafe ===
On 31 January 2025, Juanmi was loaned to Getafe with an option to buy. On 11 June, the club exercised the clause.

== International career ==
Juanmi won two consecutive UEFA European Under-19 Championships, scoring two goals in the 2011 edition in Romania. On 23 March 2015, he was called up to the senior Spain national team for the first time by coach Vicente del Bosque, ahead of a UEFA Euro 2016 qualifier against Ukraine and a friendly with the Netherlands, after Diego Costa withdrew with a hamstring injury. He made his debut in the latter game at the Amsterdam Arena on 31 March, starting and making way for Álvaro Morata in a 2–0 defeat.

On 29 December 2016, Juanmi played for the Andalusian representative side in a 3–1 home win over a La Liga XI, to raise money for UNICEF.

== Career statistics ==
=== Club ===
As of match played 25 January 2025

Appearances and goals by club, season and competition
Club	Season	League			National cup (Note: Includes Copa del Rey, FA Cup, King Cup)		League cup (Note: Includes EFL Cup)		Continental		Other		Total	
Club	Season	Division	Apps	Goals	Apps	Goals	Apps	Goals	Apps	Goals	Apps	Goals	Apps	Goals
Málaga	2009–10	La Liga	5	0	1	1	—		—		—		6	1
Málaga	2010–11	La Liga	17	4	0	0	—		—		—		17	4
Málaga	2011–12	La Liga	6	1	1	1	—		—		—		7	2
Málaga	2012–13	La Liga	1	1	4	0	—		2 (Note: Appearances in UEFA Champions League)	0	—		7	1
Málaga	2013–14	La Liga	22	4	2	1	—		—		—		24	5
Málaga	2014–15	La Liga	34	8	4	0	—		—		—		38	8
Málaga	Total		85	18	12	3	0	0	2	0	0	0	99	21
Racing Santander (loan)	2012–13	Segunda División	19	0	0	0	—		—		—		19	0
Southampton	2015–16	Premier League	12	0	1	0	2	0	4 (Note: Appearances in UEFA Europa League)	0	—		19	0
Real Sociedad	2016–17	La Liga	35	11	6	4	—		0	0	—		41	15
Real Sociedad	2017–18	La Liga	30	8	2	1	—		6	1	—		38	10
Real Sociedad	2018–19	La Liga	30	5	4	1	—		0	0	—		34	6
Real Sociedad	Total		95	24	12	6	0	0	6	1	0	0	113	31
Betis	2019–20	La Liga	8	1	0	0	—		—		—		8	1
Betis	2020–21	La Liga	16	2	4	2	—		—		—		20	4
Betis	2021–22	La Liga	33	16	6	2	—		7	2	—		46	20
Betis	2022–23	La Liga	22	4	1	0	—		3	0	1 (Note: Appearance in Supercopa de España)	0	27	4
Betis	2024–25	La Liga	11	0	2	1	—		6 (Note: Appearances in UEFA Conference League)	1	—		19	2
Betis	Total		90	23	13	5	0	0	16	3	1	0	120	31
Al-Riyadh (loan)	2023–24	Saudi Pro League	16	1	1	0	—		—		—		17	1
Cádiz (loan)	2023–24	La Liga	16	3	—		—		—		—		16	3
Career total			333	69	39	14	2	0	28	4	1	0	403	87

=== International ===
Appearances and goals by national team and year
National team	Year	Apps	Goals
Spain	2015	1	0
Total		1	0

== Honours ==
Betis

- Copa del Rey: 2021–22

Spain U19

- UEFA European Under-19 Championship: 2011, 2012

Individual

- La Liga Player of the Month: December 2021
