= Alfred N'Diaye =

Footballer (born 1990)

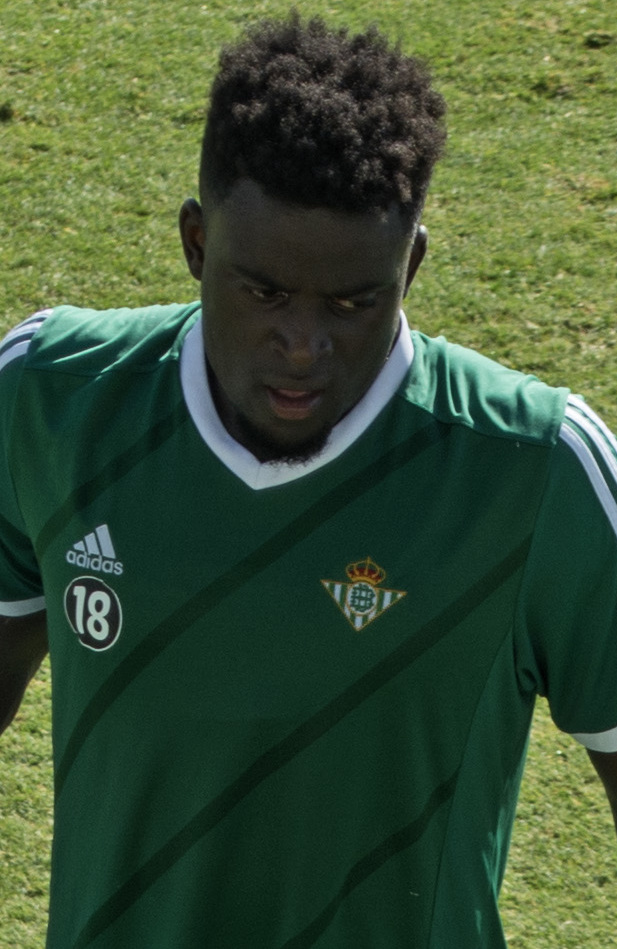
- N'Diaye training with Betis in 2015

Personal information
- Full name: Alfred John Momar N'Diaye
- Date of birth: 6 March 1990 (age 36)
- Place of birth: Paris, France
- Height: 1.86 m (6 ft 1 in)
- Position: Defensive midfielder

Youth career
- 1999–2004: US Vandœuvre
- 2004–2008: Nancy

Senior career*
Years	Team	Apps	(Gls)
2008–2011	Nancy	61	(0)
2010–2011	Nancy B	4	(0)
2011–2013	Bursaspor	51	(4)
2013–2014	Sunderland	16	(0)
2013–2014	→ Eskişehirspor (loan)	16	(3)
2014	→ Betis (loan)	16	(0)
2014–2016	Betis	62	(3)
2016–2019	Villarreal	9	(0)
2017	→ Hull City (loan)	15	(1)
2017–2018	→ Wolverhampton Wanderers (loan)	33	(3)
2018–2019	→ Málaga (loan)	34	(5)
2019–2022	Al-Shabab	65	(1)
2022–2023	Málaga	22	(0)
2024	FC Noah	7	(0)

International career
2006–2007	France U17	8	(0)
2008–2009	France U19	14	(1)
2010	France U20	2	(0)
2010	France U21	7	(0)
2013–2019	Senegal	28	(1)
Medal record
Africa Cup of Nations
Runner-up	2019
- * Club domestic league appearances and goals as of 20:51, 17 June 2024 (UTC)

Alfred John Momar N'Diaye (born 6 March 1990) is a former professional footballer who played as a defensive midfielder, who can also play as a centre back. Born in France, he played for the Senegal national team.

== Club career ==
=== Early career ===
Born in Paris, France, N'Diaye began his career with US Vandœuvre in Vandœuvre-lès-Nancy. At the age of 14, he moved across the arrondissement to join the biggest club in the region, AS Nancy. Upon arrival, Alfred endured early struggles, but quickly gained noticed following his second season at the academy. In 2006, he signed his first professional contract.

=== Nancy ===
N'Diaye made his debut in the squad during the 2007–08 season in the Coupe de la Ligue, at the age of 17, coming on as a halftime substitute for Frédéric Biancalani in a 3–0 loss to Lens. That was his only appearance that season as he would be relegated back to the reserves helping a young Nancy reserve squad barely avoid relegation.

Following the season, N'Diaye earned promotion to the senior squad for the 2008–09 season. He was assigned the number 29 shirt and made his league debut in the opening match of the season against Lille appearing as a substitute in a 0–0 draw. Two months later, he earned his first league start in a 1–1 draw against Paris Saint-Germain. His positive play earned him regular starts in the squad, including playing the full 90 minutes in the club's 3–0 upset victory over Olympique de Marseille at the Stade Vélodrome and playing, on two occasions, 120 minutes of football in cup play against Grenoble in the Coupe de la Ligue and SO Romorantin in the Coupe de France. In total, he made 27 appearances and collected 7 yellow cards.

=== Bursaspor ===
On 1 July 2011, Nancy confirmed on its website that the club had reached an agreement with Turkish club Bursaspor for the transfer of N'Diaye. The deal was finalised on 3 July for a reported fee of €2 million.

=== Sunderland ===
On 9 January 2013, it was announced that Sunderland had completed the signing of N'Diaye for an undisclosed fee. He was given the number 4 shirt. On 12 January 2013, N'Diaye made his Sunderland debut at the Stadium of Light in a match which they won 3–0 against West Ham United. He came on as a substitute for Adam Johnson and almost scored with his first touch in English Football as his shot went just wide. His full debut for Sunderland came against Wigan away, in which he produced a "wonderful" assist for Steven Fletcher to score and put them in front.

==== Eskişehirspor (loan) ====
On 28 July 2013 it was announced N'Diaye would join Turkish club Eskişehirspor on a season-long loan. On 28 January 2014, Eskişehirspor announced that N'Diaye's loan had been terminated by the club.

=== Betis ===
On 30 January 2014, N'Diaye joined Spanish side Real Betis on loan for the remainder of the 2013–14 campaign. He appeared in 16 matches, as the Andalusians were relegated.

On 22 August 2014, free agent N'Diaye signed a five-year deal with the Béticos.

=== Villarreal ===
On 8 July 2016, N'Diaye signed a five-year contract with Villarreal CF also in the main category.

==== Hull City (loan) ====
On 31 January 2017, N'Diaye moved on loan to Hull City for the remainder of the 2016–17 Premier League season. N'Diaye made his debut and scored the first goal in a home 2–0 victory over Liverpool. Despite impressing during his 15 games at the club, N'Diaye was unable to keep Hull in the Premier League.

==== Wolverhampton Wanderers (loan) ====
On 31 August 2017, the transfer deadline day of the 2017/18 summer transfer window, N'Diaye completed a last-gasp loan deal (with the option of a permanent move) to English Championship club Wolverhampton Wanderers. He made his debut for the club on 9 September 2017, coming on as a substitute in a 1–0 win against Millwall. He scored his first goal for the club on 23 September 2017 in a 2–1 win against Barnsley after coming on as a substitute.

He played 36 games for Wolverhampton Wanderers in all competitions, as he helped the club win the EFL Championship title and gain promotion to the Premier League.

==== Málaga (loan) ====
On 10 August 2018, N'Diaye moved on loan to Málaga for the 2018–19 Segunda División season.

=== Al-Shabab ===
On 30 August 2019, N'Diaye moved to Saudi club Al-Shabab FC on a three-year contract.

On 24 August 2022, N'Diaye was released from his contract.

=== Noah ===
On 1 February 2024, Armenian Premier League club Noah announced the signing of N'Diaye.

== International career ==
Having played through the France national youth football teams, he decided to play for Senegal national team and played his first senior international match in 2013.

In May 2018 he was named in Senegal's 23-man squad for the 2018 FIFA World Cup in Russia. N'Diaye played for Senegal in two group stage matches during the tournament, against Poland and Japan respectively.

== Career statistics ==
=== Club ===
As of 30 May 2021

Appearances and goals by club, season and competition
Club	Season	League			National cup		League cup		Continental		Total	
Club	Season	Division	Apps	Goals	Apps	Goals	Apps	Goals	Apps	Goals	Apps	Goals
Nancy	2008–09	Ligue 1	24	0	1	0	2	0	4	0	31	0
Nancy	2009–10	Ligue 1	23	0	1	0	1	0	—		25	0
Nancy	2010–11	Ligue 1	14	0	1	0	1	0	—		16	0
Nancy	Total		61	0	3	0	4	0	4	0	72	0
Nancy B	2010–11	CFA	4	0	—						4	0
Bursaspor	2011–12	Süper Lig	37	3	4	0	0	0	4	1	45	4
Bursaspor	2012–13	Süper Lig	14	1	3	2	0	0	4	1	21	4
Bursaspor	Total		51	4	7	2	0	0	8	2	66	8
Sunderland	2012–13	Premier League	16	0	0	0	0	0	—		16	0
Eskişehirspor (loan)	2013–14	Süper Lig	16	3	3	1	0	0	—		19	4
Betis	2013–14	La Liga	16	0	0	0	0	0	4	0	20	0
Betis	2014–15	Segunda División	28	1	1	0	0	0	—		29	1
Betis	2015–16	La Liga	34	2	2	0	0	0	—		36	2
Betis	Total		78	3	3	0	0	0	4	0	85	3
Villarreal	2016–17	La Liga	7	0	1	0	—		5	1	13	1
Villarreal	2017–18	La Liga	2	0	0	0	—		0	0	2	0
Villarreal	Total		9	0	1	0	0	0	5	1	15	1
Hull City (loan)	2016–17	Premier League	15	1	0	0	0	0	—		15	1
Wolverhampton Wanderers (loan)	2017–18	Championship	33	3	2	0	2	0	—		37	3
Málaga (loan)	2018–19	Segunda División	34	5	0	0	–		—		34	5
Al-Shabab	2019–20	Saudi Pro League	22	0	0	0	–		4 (Note: Appearances in AFC Champions League)	0	26	0
Al-Shabab	2020–21	Saudi Pro League	26	1	1	0	–		–		27	1
Al-Shabab	Total		48	1	1	0	0	0	4	0	53	1
Career total			398	21	20	3	6	0	25	3	443	27

=== International ===
As of 11 July 2019

Appearances and goals by national team and year
National team	Year	Apps	Goals
Senegal	2013	1	0
Senegal	2014	7	0
Senegal	2015	2	0
Senegal	2016	0	0
Senegal	2017	3	0
Senegal	2018	10	0
Senegal	2019	4	0
Total		27	0

== Honours ==
Wolverhampton Wanderers

- EFL Championship: 2017–18
