= Recio (footballer) =

Spanish footballer

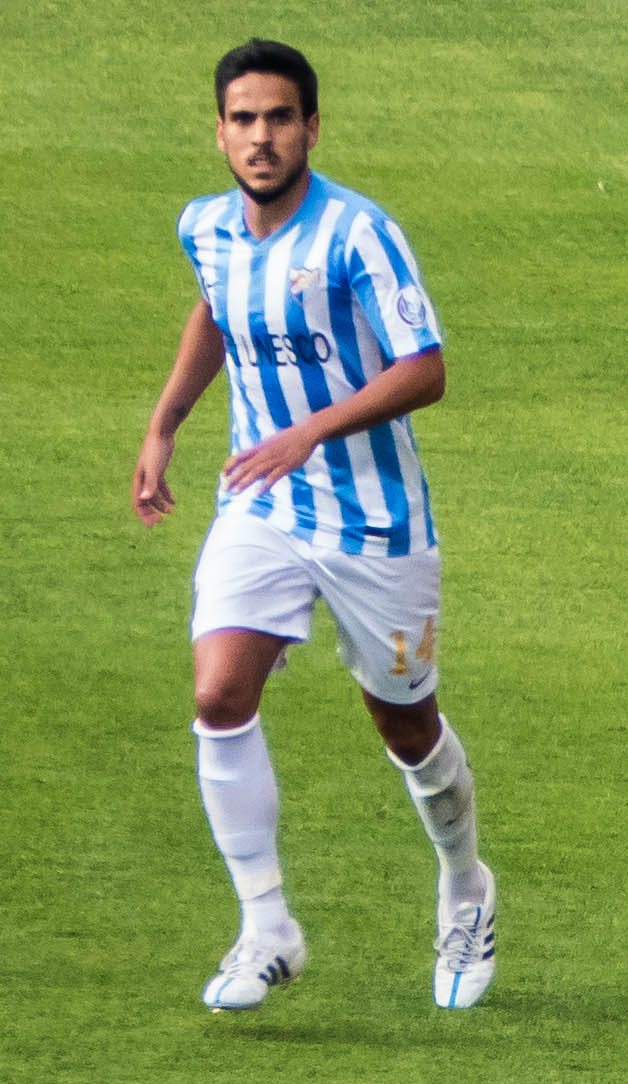
- Recio playing for Málaga in 2015

Personal information
- Full name: José Luis García del Pozo
- Date of birth: 11 January 1991 (age 35)
- Place of birth: Málaga, Spain
- Height: 1.83 m (6 ft 0 in)
- Position: Midfielder

Youth career
- Málaga

Senior career*
Years	Team	Apps	(Gls)
2010–2011	Málaga B	16	(0)
2010–2018	Málaga	140	(7)
2013–2014	→ Granada (loan)	45	(4)
2018–2022	Leganés	64	(1)
2020–2021	→ Eibar (loan)	17	(1)
2022–2023	Apollon Limassol	11	(0)
2023–2024	Córdoba	21	(0)

International career
2011	Spain U20	6	(0)
2011	Spain U21	1	(0)
- * Club domestic league appearances and goals as of 25 May 2024

José Luis García del Pozo (born 11 January 1991), known as Recio, is a Spanish professional footballer who plays as a central midfielder.

== Club career ==
=== Málaga ===
Born in Málaga, Andalusia, Recio was a product of local Málaga CF's youth system. He made his first-team debut on 11 November 2010 shortly after the arrival of manager Manuel Pellegrini who succeeded sacked Jesualdo Ferreira, starting in a Copa del Rey 3–2 home win against Hércules CF, in the round-of-32's second leg (3–2 on aggregate). Ten days later he first appeared in La Liga, again as a starter but in a 3–0 loss at Deportivo de La Coruña.

Late into the month, after performing solidly in his first matches, Recio signed his first professional contract, linking him with Málaga until the summer of 2015. On 5 December 2010 he scored his first goal as a senior, in a 4–1 home victory over Racing de Santander.

On 9 January 2013, after featuring rarely during the first half of the season, Recio was loaned to neighbouring and fellow league club Granada CF, until June. He made his debut five days later, coming on as a substitute in a 2−2 away draw against Getafe CF. He netted his first goal for the side on the 19th, in a 2−0 home defeat of Rayo Vallecano that also was his first start.

Upon returning Recio became an undisputed starter, signing a contract extension until 2018 on 11 December 2014. On 21 February 2017, he renewed his link until 2021.

=== Leganés ===
On 31 August 2018, after Málaga's relegation from the top flight, Recio signed a four-year deal with CD Leganés. On 4 September 2020, as Lega met the same fate as his previous club, he was loaned to SD Eibar for one year.

== International career ==
On 24 March 2011, courtesy of his performances with Málaga's first team, Recio made his debut with Spain under-21s, in a friendly against France. Also that year, he represented his country in the FIFA U-20 World Cup held in Colombia, appearing in four games in an eventual quarter-final exit.

== Career statistics ==
As of 11 March 2019

Appearances and goals by club, season and competition
Club	Season	League			National cup		League cup		Other		Total	
Club	Season	Division	Apps	Goals	Apps	Goals	Apps	Goals	Apps	Goals	Apps	Goals
Málaga	2010–11	La Liga	23	2	2	0	—		—		25	2
Málaga	2011–12	La Liga	8	0	0	0	—		—		8	0
Málaga	2012–13	La Liga	4	0	3	0	—		—		7	0
Málaga	2014–15	La Liga	30	1	6	2	—		—		36	3
Málaga	2015–16	La Liga	33	0	1	0	—		—		34	0
Málaga	2016–17	La Liga	18	3	0	0	—		—		18	3
Málaga	2017–18	La Liga	22	1	1	1	—		—		23	2
Málaga	2018–19	Segunda División	2	0	0	0	—		—		2	0
Málaga	Total		140	7	13	3	0	0	0	0	153	10
Granada (loan)	2012–13	La Liga	15	2	0	0	—		—		15	2
Granada (loan)	2013–14	La Liga	30	2	2	0	—		—		32	2
Granada (loan)	Total		45	4	0	0	0	0	0	0	45	4
Leganés	2018–19	La Liga	12	0	2	0	—		—		14	0
Career totals			197	11	17	3	0	0	0	0	214	14
