= Fernando Tissone =

Argentine footballer (born 1986)

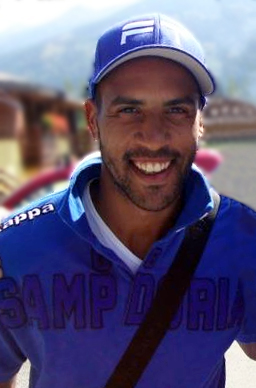
- Tissone with Sampdoria in 2012

Personal information
- Full name: Fernando Damián Tissone Rodrigues
- Date of birth: 24 July 1986 (age 40)
- Place of birth: Quilmes, Argentina
- Height: 1.82 m (6 ft 0 in)
- Position: Midfielder

Team information
- Current team: Sangiustese

Youth career
- Quilmes
- 1997–1999: Independiente
- 1999–2004: Lanús

Senior career*
Years	Team	Apps	(Gls)
2004	Lanús		
2005–2006	Udinese	26	(0)
2006–2008	Atalanta	68	(6)
2008–2009	Udinese	5	(0)
2009–2013	Sampdoria	63	(1)
2011–2012	→ Mallorca (loan)	27	(0)
2013	→ Mallorca (loan)	15	(0)
2013–2016	Málaga	45	(1)
2017–2018	Karpaty Lviv	13	(0)
2018	Desportivo Aves	12	(1)
2018–2019	Nacional	12	(1)
2021	Taranto	24	(1)
2021–2022	Paganese	26	(1)
2022	Budoni	3	(0)
2023–	Sangiustese	0	(0)
- * Club domestic league appearances and goals as of 29 March 2023

Fernando Damián Tissone Rodrigues (born 24 July 1986) is an Argentine professional footballer who plays as a central midfielder for Eccellenza club Sangiustese.

== Career ==
=== Early career ===
Tissone was born in Quilmes, Buenos Aires Province. He started his football career in Independiente's youth system before moving to neighbours Lanús.

=== Udinese ===
After making only one appearance for Lanús, Tissone was scouted by Italian side Udinese, joining the club in 2005 and making 26 Serie A appearances for the club, mainly as a substitute.

=== Atalanta ===
On 10 August 2006, Tissone was signed by Atalanta in a co-ownership deal for €1.5 million in a five-year deal. However, Udinese also acquired 50% of the registration rights of both Michele Rinaldi for €800,000 and Christian Tiboni for €1.1 million, Tissone played 33 games for the Bergamo-based club in 2006–07 Serie A season. In June 2007 the co-ownerships were renewed.

Tissone made 35 appearances in 2007–08 Serie A, missing only three match, including a suspension for a fourth yellow card received.

On 26 June 2008, Tissone returned to Udinese for €4.165 million, with Rinaldi and Tiboni both returning to Atalanta for undisclosed fees (which Atalanta immediately write-down their value).

=== Sampdoria ===
On 22 July 2009, Tissone joined Sampdoria in a co-ownership from Udinese, for €2.5 million cash and 50% of the registration rights of Jonathan Rossini; Tissone signed four-year contract. He remained at the club for two seasons, appearing in 52 league matches and scoring once, against Brescia on 1 May 2011. The co-ownerships were renewed in June 2010 and June 2011.

On 31 August 2011, Tissone was loaned to La Liga side Mallorca. He made his debut in the competition on 11 September, coming on as a late substitute in a 1–0 loss at Real Betis.

Tissone featured regularly with the Balearic outfit during the 2011–12 campaign, and returned to Samp in June 2012. In June 2012, Sampdoria acquired Tissone outright from Udinese for an additional €100,000. Tissone made 12 appearances in 2012–13 Serie A for Sampdoria

On 29 January 2013, Tissone returned to Mallorca, on loan until June, for €100,000.

=== Málaga ===
After Mallorca's relegation to the Segunda División, Tissone moved to La Liga side Málaga in a three-year deal on 6 July 2013 on a free transfer.

=== CD Nacional ===
On 28 September 2018, Tissone signed for Nacional.

=== Later years ===
In January 2021, after over a year of inactivity, Tissone signed a six-month contract for Italian Serie D club Taranto, with whom he won promotion to Serie C. He successively joined Serie C club Paganese for the 2021–22 season. In November 2022, Tissone joined Eccellenza Sardinia amateur club Budoni, joining with his brother Cristian, both of them leaving the club just a month later.

On 29 March 2023, both Fernando and Cristian Tissone signed for Eccellenza Marche team Sangiustese.

== Personal life ==
Tissone holds an Italian passport, and is also eligible for Cape Verde due to his grandfather.

Tissone's brother, Christian, is also a footballer, but spent the vast majority of his career representing Italian lower division sides, and also switched his nationality to Cape Verde.

== Honours ==
Aves

- Taça de Portugal: 2017–18
