= Javi Gracia =

Spanish footballer and manager (born 1970)

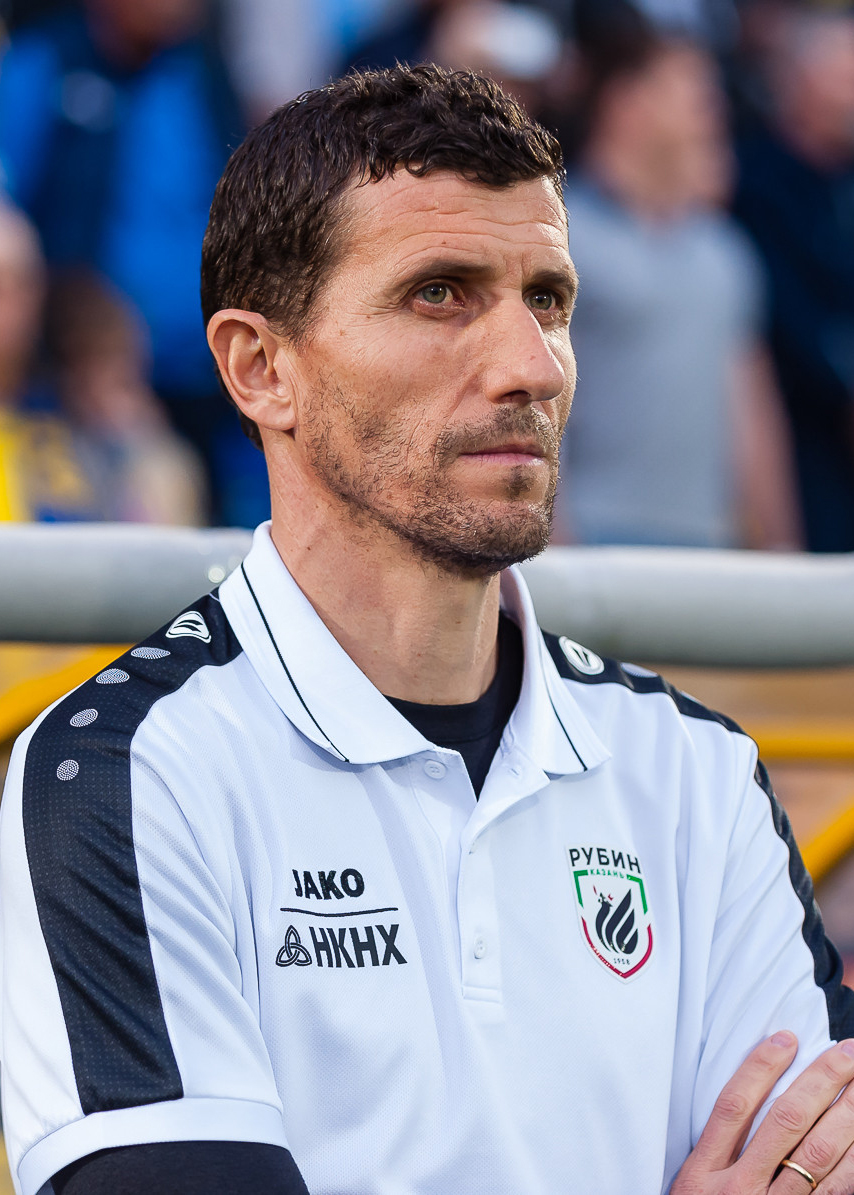
- Gracia as manager of Rubin Kazan in 2017

Personal information
- Full name: Javier Gracia Carlos
- Date of birth: 1 May 1970 (age 56)
- Place of birth: Pamplona, Spain
- Height: 1.85 m (6 ft 1 in)
- Position: Defensive midfielder

Youth career
- 1977–1982: Osasuna
- Chantrea
- Athletic Bilbao

Senior career*
Years	Team	Apps	(Gls)
1989–1992	Bilbao Athletic	100	(12)
1992–1993	Lleida	38	(12)
1993–1995	Valladolid	65	(2)
1995–1999	Real Sociedad	106	(12)
1999–2002	Villarreal	82	(6)
2003–2004	Córdoba	39	(0)
Total		430	(44)

International career
1989–1990	Spain U20	3	(0)
1991	Spain U21	1	(0)

Managerial career
- 2004–2005: Villarreal (youth)
- 2007–2008: Pontevedra
- 2008–2010: Cádiz
- 2010–2011: Villarreal B
- 2011: Olympiacos Volos
- 2011–2012: Kerkyra
- 2012–2013: Almería
- 2013–2014: Osasuna
- 2014–2016: Málaga
- 2016–2017: Rubin Kazan
- 2018–2019: Watford
- 2020–2021: Valencia
- 2021–2022: Al Sadd
- 2023: Leeds United
- 2025–2026: Watford
- * Club domestic league appearances and goals

Javier "Javi" Gracia Carlos (Spanish pronunciation: [ˈxaβi ˈɣɾaθja]; (Note: In isolation, Gracia is pronounced [ˈɡɾaθja].) born 1 May 1970) is a Spanish football manager and former player who played as a defensive midfielder.

He totalled 430 matches across both major levels of Spanish football, in a 15-year professional career. After retiring he began working as a manager, going on to coach several clubs in Spain, Greece and Russia before being appointed at Watford in January 2018.

Gracia led Watford to their second FA Cup final in their history in 2019, but was sacked later the same year. From June 2020 to May 2021 he worked with Valencia, and a year later he won the Qatar Stars League during a brief spell at Al Sadd before managing Leeds United for three months in 2023.

== Playing career ==
Born in Pamplona, Navarre, Gracia started playing professionally with Bilbao Athletic, Athletic Bilbao's reserves, never appearing officially for the first team. In the 1992–93 campaign, he scored a career-best 12 goals in all 38 games as Lleida returned to La Liga after an absence of more than 40 years, as champions.

Gracia spent the following six seasons in the top flight, appearing regularly for both Real Valladolid and Real Sociedad until 1998–99 (15 matches, one goal). In 1999, he returned to Segunda División and signed for Villarreal, helping the Valencian club to get promoted to the top division after one year and being regularly used the following campaign – 1,764 minutes of action – as the team retained their status.

In February 2003, after being scarcely played in his last one and a half seasons at Villarreal, the 32-year-old Gracia joined Córdoba in the second level, closing out his career in June of the following year. He appeared in 229 Spanish top-tier games over the course of nine seasons, netting 17 goals.

== Coaching career ==
=== Early years ===
After starting his managerial career with the youth sides of his former club Villarreal, Gracia worked in the Segunda División B with Pontevedra, finishing first and second with the team in the regular season but always falling short in the promotion playoffs.

In 2008–09, still in the third division, Gracia finally achieved promotion, now with Cádiz, but he was fired midway through the following season as the Andalusians were immediately relegated. In the 2010–11 campaign, with Villarreal's reserves, he managed to avert a drop also in the second tier, even though José Francisco Molina was in charge for the final four fixtures.

=== Greece ===
In June 2011, Gracia was hired by Olympiacos Volos, who had finished fifth in the Super League Greece. He debuted with the first European fixtures of his managerial career, eliminating Rad and Differdange from the UEFA Europa League qualifiers, but the team were then expelled from the top flight and European competition due to their alleged involvement in the Koriopolis match-fixing scandal.

Having terminated his contract, Gracia remained in the same league for the rest of 2011–12 at Kerkyra. He took the Corfu-based club to the last eight of the national cup, where they lost by a single goal at Asteras Tripolis.

=== Almería ===
Gracia returned to his country in June 2012, being hired by Almería. He led the team back to the top flight in his one season, but left after failing to agree new terms.

=== Osasuna ===
On 4 September 2013, Gracia was appointed at his hometown club Osasuna on a two-year deal, replacing the fired José Luis Mendilibar. On his top-flight debut eleven days later, he lost 2–1 at Getafe. His team were relegated in 18th place on the last day, ending 14 years in the top division, despite winning 2–1 against already condemned Real Betis; results included heavy defeats against his former teams and rivals Real Sociedad and Athletic Bilbao and a 7–0 loss at Barcelona, but also a 3–0 home win over reigning champions Atlético Madrid on 23 February 2014.

=== Málaga ===
Gracia was named the new manager of Málaga on 30 May 2014. During his two-year tenure, he led the team to the ninth and eighth position, respectively.

=== Rubin Kazan ===
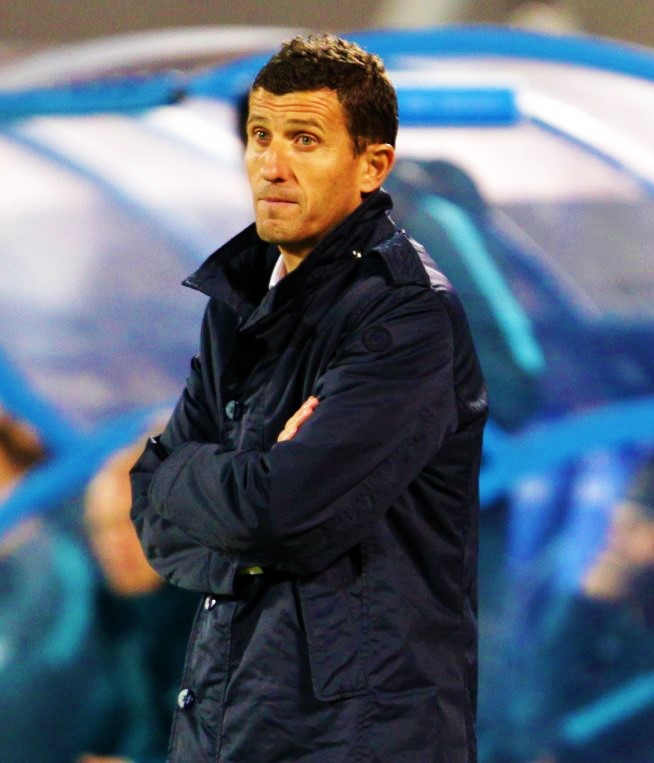
Gracia with Rubin Kazan in 2016

Before the start of the 2016–17 season, Gracia joined Rubin Kazan. After only achieving a ninth-place finish in the Russian Premier League, he left the club by mutual consent.

=== Watford ===
On 21 January 2018, Gracia was named the new head coach of Watford on an 18-month contract following the dismissal of Marco Silva. His first game in charge took place six days later, in a 1–0 away loss against Southampton in the fourth round of the FA Cup.

In the 2018–19 campaign, Gracia again coached the team to safety in the Premier League, the 11th place being their highest since 1986–87, and took them to the final of the FA Cup for the first time in 35 years and for only the second time in the club's history. He was sacked on 7 September 2019, after a poor start to the season saw them bottom with just one point.

=== Valencia ===
Gracia returned to Spain's top division on 27 July 2020, agreeing to a two-year deal at Valencia. The following 3 May, after a 3–2 home defeat to Barcelona that left the side in 14th place, he was dismissed.

=== Al Sadd ===
On 7 December 2021, Gracia was hired by Al Sadd in the Qatar Stars League, after his compatriot Xavi had left for Barcelona; he signed until 2023 with the option of one more year. The following 21 February, the team retained their title with an 8–2 win over Al Ahli. He then left and was replaced by a third Spaniard, Juan Manuel Lillo.

=== Leeds United ===
On 21 February 2023, Gracia returned to England and its top flight after replacing the sacked Jesse Marsch at the helm of Leeds United. The club announced the contract would be "flexible" but did not elaborate on that statement, further saying Gracia's appointment would be subject to the issuance of a work permit. His debut took place four days later, a 1–0 home win over Southampton.

Gracia was sacked on 3 May 2023, leaving the side 17th on the table with four fixtures remaining. He defended his record, noting that he had taken the team out of the relegation zone and had earned more points in his 11 games than four clubs around them.

=== Return to Watford ===
On 8 October 2025, Gracia returned to Watford for a second spell after Paulo Pezzolano was dismissed. Following a winless run of four matches, he resigned on 1 February 2026.

== Personal life ==
Gracia's parents were both teachers. He is married with three sons, two of whom are twins.

== Managerial statistics ==
As of 31 January 2026

Managerial record by team and tenure
Team	From	To	Record					Ref.
Team	From	To	P	W	D	L	Win %	Ref.
Pontevedra	20 March 2007	30 June 2008	57	28	19	10	49.12	
Cádiz	11 July 2008	9 January 2010	63	30	16	17	47.62	
Villarreal B	24 June 2010	12 May 2011	38	14	5	19	36.84	
Olympiacos Volos	7 June 2011	24 August 2011	4	3	1	0	75.00	
Kerkyra	14 November 2011	28 March 2012	21	7	4	10	33.33	
Almería	12 June 2012	28 June 2013	50	28	9	13	56.00	
Osasuna	4 September 2013	30 May 2014	39	10	11	18	25.64	
Málaga	30 May 2014	24 May 2016	84	28	22	34	33.33	
Rubin Kazan	27 May 2016	8 June 2017	34	13	8	13	38.24	
Watford	21 January 2018	7 September 2019	66	25	13	28	37.88	
Valencia	27 July 2020	3 May 2021	38	10	13	15	26.32	
Al Sadd	7 December 2021	18 June 2022	22	16	2	4	72.73	
Leeds United	21 February 2023	3 May 2023	12	3	2	7	25.00	
Watford	8 October 2025	1 February 2026	21	8	7	6	38.10	
Career total			549	223	132	194	40.62	—

== Honours ==
=== Player ===
Lleida

- Segunda División: 1992–93

=== Manager ===
Pontevedra

- Segunda División B: 2006–07

Cádiz

- Segunda División B: 2008–09

Watford

- FA Cup runner-up: 2018–19

Al Sadd

- Qatar Stars League: 2021–22

Individual

- Premier League Manager of the Month: August 2018
