= 2016–17 CA Osasuna season =

CA Osasuna
2016–17 season
- President: Luis Sabalza
- Head coach: Petar Vasiljević
- Stadium: El Sadar
- La Liga: 19th (relegated)
- Copa del Rey: Round of 16
Home colours	Away colours	Third colours

The 2016–17 season was the 96th season in the history of CA Osasuna. During the 2016–17 season, the club competed in La Liga, after two years in the Segunda División, and the Copa del Rey.

== Current squad ==
As of 17 January 2017

Note: Flags indicate national team as defined under FIFA eligibility rules; some limited exceptions apply. Players may hold more than one non-FIFA nationality.

No.	Pos.	Nation	Player
1	GK	ESP	Mario Fernández
2	DF	ESP	Javier Flaño
3	DF	DOM	Tano Bonnín
4	DF	ESP	Miguel Flaño (Captain)
5	DF	ESP	David García (4th captain)
6	MF	ESP	Oier (2nd captain)
7	FW	ESP	Sergio León
8	MF	SRB	Goran Čaušić
9	FW	ESP	Oriol Riera (on loan from Deportivo La Coruña)
10	MF	ESP	Roberto Torres (3rd captain)
11	MF	ESP	Álex Berenguer
12	FW	FRA	Emmanuel Rivière (on loan from Newcastle United)
13	GK	ESP	Nauzet
14	MF	ESP	Fausto
15	DF	ESP	Unai García

No.	Pos.	Nation	Player
16	DF	ESP	Juan Fuentes
17	MF	ESP	Jaime Romero
18	MF	ESP	Fran Mérida
19	FW	ESP	Kenan Kodro
20	MF	ESP	Miguel de las Cuevas
21	DF	ESP	Carlos Clerc
22	DF	MNE	Nikola Vujadinović
23	MF	FRA	Didier Digard (on loan from Real Betis)
24	MF	CMR	Raoul Loé
25	GK	ITA	Salvatore Sirigu (on loan from Paris Saint-Germain)
31	MF	ESP	Imanol García
33	DF	ESP	Iván Márquez
34	DF	ESP	Aitor Buñuel
35	MF	ESP	Miguel Olavide
36	MF	ESP	Antonio Otegui

== Competitions ==
=== Overall ===
Competition	Started round	Current position / round	Final position / round	First match	Last match
La Liga	Matchday 1	20th		19 August 2016	21 May 2017
Copa del Rey	Round of 32	Round of 32	Round of 16	30 November 2016	12 January 2017

Updated to match played 29 February 2017
Source: Competitions

=== La Liga ===
==== League table ====
Pos	Team	Pld	W	D	L	GF	GA	GD	Pts	Qualification or relegation
16	Deportivo La Coruña	38	8	12	18	43	61	−18	36	
17	Leganés	38	8	11	19	36	55	−19	35	
18	Sporting Gijón (R)	38	7	10	21	42	72	−30	31	Relegation to Segunda División
19	Osasuna (R)	38	4	10	24	40	94	−54	22	Relegation to Segunda División
20	Granada (R)	38	4	8	26	30	82	−52	20	Relegation to Segunda División

Source: La Liga, Soccerway
Rules for classification: 1) Points; 2) Head-to-head points; 3) Head-to-head goal difference; 4) Goal difference; 5) Goals scored; 6) Fair-play points; 7) Play-off.
(R) Relegated

==== Results summary ====
Overall								Home						Away					
Pld	W	D	L	GF	GA	GD	Pts	W	D	L	GF	GA	GD	W	D	L	GF	GA	GD
38	4	10	24	40	94	−54	22	2	7	10	23	39	−16	2	3	14	17	55	−38

Last updated: 20 May 2017.

==== Results by matchday ====
Matchday	1	2	3	4	5	6	7	8	9	10	11	12	13	14	15	16	17	18	19	20	21	22	23	24	25	26	27	28	29	30	31	32	33	34	35	36	37	38
Ground	A	H	A	H	H	A	H	A	H	A	H	A	H	A	H	A	H	A	H	H	A	H	A	A	H	A	H	A	H	A	H	A	H	A	H	A	H	A
Result	D	L	L	D	L	L	D	W	L	D	L	L	L	L	L	L	D	D	L	D	L	L	L	L	L	L	D	L	L	W	W	L	D	L	D	L	W	L
Position	20	20	20	20	20	20	20	20	20	20	20	20	20	20	20	20	20	20	20	20	20	20	20	20	20	20	20	20	20	20	20	20	20	20	20	20	19	19

Updated to match(es) played on 20 May 2017. Source:
A = Away; H = Home; W = Win; D = Draw; L = Loss

=== Matches ===
==== La Liga ====
19 August 2016 1	Málaga	1–1	Osasuna	Málaga
20:45 CEST	Keko (yellow card) 40'; Juanpi 56', (yellow card) 90+4'	Report	Oier (yellow card) 17'; Fausto (yellow card) 68'; Buñuel (yellow card) 73'; Mérida 85'	Stadium: La Rosaleda; Attendance: 22,347; Referee: Santiago Jaime Latre

27 August 2016 2	Osasuna	0–2	Real Sociedad	Pamplona
18:15 CEST	Flaño (yellow card) 20'; U. García (yellow card) 23'	Report	Juanmi 45+2'; González (yellow card) 66'; U. García 81' (o.g.)	Stadium: El Sadar; Attendance: 16,343; Referee: Alfonso Álvarez Izquierdo

10 September 2016 3	Real Madrid	5–2	Osasuna	Madrid
16:00 CEST	Ronaldo 6'; Danilo 40', (yellow card) 69'; Ramos 45+1', (yellow card) 72'; Pepe 56'; Modrić 62'	Report	Flaño (yellow card) 17'; U. García (yellow card) 32'; Riera 64'; Bonnín (yellow card) 75' (yellow-red card) 79'; D. García 78'	Stadium: Santiago Bernabéu; Attendance: 64,275; Referee: David Fernández Borbalán

18 September 2016 4	Osasuna	0–0	Celta Vigo	Pamplona
12:00 CEST	Oier (yellow card) 27'; D. García (yellow card) 32'; Mérida (yellow card) 36'; Torres (yellow card) 64'	Report	Guidetti (yellow card) 43'	Stadium: El Sadar; Attendance: 14,854; Referee: Daniel Trujillo Suárez

22 September 2016 5	Osasuna	1–2	Espanyol	Pamplona
20:00 CEST	I. García (yellow card) 38'; León 68', (yellow card) 87'	Report	Baptistão 42'; Diop (yellow card) 51'; Gerard 72'	Stadium: El Sadar; Attendance: 14,597; Referee: Iñaki Vicandi Garrido

25 September 2016 6	Villarreal	3–1	Osasuna	Villarreal
18:30 CEST	Pato 5'; Bruno 24' (pen.); Sansone 39'	Report	Fernández (yellow card) 23'; Torres 45+1' (pen.); Olavide (yellow card) 62'	Stadium: El Madrigal; Attendance: 17,679; Referee: Daniel Ocón Arráiz

1 October 2016 7	Osasuna	2–2	Las Palmas	Pamplona
18:30 CEST	Torres 7' (pen.); León 45+2'; U. García (yellow card) 71'; Fausto (yellow card) 78'; Nauzet (yellow card) 90'	Report	Aythami (yellow card) 34'; Gómez 57'; Livaja (yellow card) 71'; Michel (yellow card) 74'; Tana (yellow card) 83'; D. García 90+1'	Stadium: El Sadar; Attendance: 15,208; Referee: Ignacio Iglesias Villanueva

17 October 2016 8	Eibar	2–3	Osasuna	Eibar
20:45 CEST	Escalante 1'; Enrich 45'; Capa (yellow card) 62'	Report	Digard (yellow card) 15'; León 29', 32', (yellow card) 75'; Torres 58'	Stadium: Ipurua; Attendance: 5,216; Referee: Mario Melero López

21 October 2016 9	Osasuna	1–2	Real Betis	Pamplona
20:45 CEST	D. García (yellow card) 45+1'; Torres 48', (yellow card) 58'; De las Cuevas (yellow card) 57'; Rivière (red card) 87'	Report	Joaquín 19'; Brašanac (yellow card) 86'; Cejudo (yellow card) 88'; Gutiérrez 90+1'	Stadium: El Sadar; Attendance: 15,105; Referee: Carlos del Cerro Grande

30 October 2016 10	Athletic Bilbao	1–1	Osasuna	Bilbao
16:15 CET	García 28'; Muniain (yellow card) 60'; Rico (yellow card) 71'	Report	Riera 23'; Oier (yellow card) 74'	Stadium: San Mamés; Attendance: 43,396; Referee: José Luis Munuera Montero

5 November 2016 11	Osasuna	0–1	Alavés	Pamplona
18:30 CET	U. García (yellow card) 17'; Fausto (yellow card) 65'; D. García (yellow card) 75'; Flaño (yellow card) 90'; Oier (yellow card) 90+2'	Report	Toquero (yellow card) 73'; Santos 77' (pen.); Espinoza (yellow card) 89'	Stadium: El Sadar; Attendance: 15,929; Referee: Daniel Ocón Arráiz

21 November 2016 12	Leganés	2–0	Osasuna	Leganés
20:45 CET	Ibáñez 6', 57'; Rico (yellow card) 32'; Bustinza (yellow card) 62'	Report	D. García (yellow card) 43'; Rivière (yellow card) 55'; Olavide (yellow card) 88'	Stadium: Butarque; Attendance: 8,827; Referee: Ignacio Iglesias Villanueva

27 November 2016 13	Osasuna	0–3	Atlético Madrid	Pamplona
16:15 CET	Bonnín (yellow card) 10'; Čaušić (yellow card) 22'	Report	Tiago (yellow card) 21'; Giménez (yellow card) 31'; Godín 36'; Gameiro 37'; Carrasco 90'	Stadium: El Sadar; Attendance: 16,385; Referee: Antonio Mateu Lahoz

4 December 2016 14	Sporting de Gijón	3–1	Osasuna	Gijón
18:30 CET	Amorebieta (yellow card) 37'; Carmona 43', 78'; Douglas 56', (yellow card) 68'; Čop (yellow card) 67'	Report	Márquez (yellow card) 39'; Flaño 86'	Stadium: El Molinón; Attendance: 25,800; Referee: Ricardo de Burgos Bengoetxea

10 December 2016 15	Osasuna	0–3	Barcelona	Pamplona
13:00 CET	Oier (yellow card) 27'; Márquez (yellow card) 52'; Torres (yellow card) 84'	Report	L. Suárez 59'; Messi 72', 90+2'	Stadium: El Sadar; Attendance: 17,349; Referee: Juan Martínez Munuera

18 December 2016 16	Deportivo La Coruña	2–0	Osasuna	A Coruña
18:30 CET	Andone 7'; Babel 42'; Juanfran (yellow card) 66'	Report	De las Cuevas (yellow card) 52'; Márquez (yellow card) 73'; Clerc (yellow card) 79'	Stadium: Riazor; Attendance: 22,966; Referee: José María Sánchez Martínez

9 January 2017 17	Osasuna	3–3	Valencia	Pamplona
20:45 CET	Riera 7'; Márquez (yellow card) 38'; Torres 62'; Oier (yellow card) 80'; Clerc 90+2'	Report	Munir 2', (yellow card) 88'; Suárez (yellow card) 9'; Parejo (yellow card) 24'; Mangala (yellow card) 41'; Riera 45+1' (o.g.); Montoya 73'; Pérez (yellow card) 90+4'	Stadium: El Sadar; Attendance: 12,239; Referee: Alfonso Álvarez Izquierdo

15 January 2017 18	Granada	1–1	Osasuna	Granada
18:30 CET	Pereira (yellow card) 11'; Kravets 69'; Ponce (yellow card) 72' (yellow-red card) 90+5'; Agbo (red card) 73'; Tabanou (yellow card) 83'	Report	Riera 12', (yellow card) 66'; Fausto (yellow card) 13'; D. García (yellow card) 67'; Berenguer (yellow card) 79'	Stadium: Los Cármenes; Attendance: 14,328; Referee: Daniel Trujillo Suárez

22 January 2017 19	Osasuna	3–4	Sevilla	Pamplona
12:00 CET	Fausto (yellow card) 2'; León 15'; Torres (yellow card) 18'; Iborra 63' (o.g.); Fernández (yellow card) 81'; Riera (yellow card) 81'; Kondro 90+3'	Report	Nzonzi (yellow card) 19'; Rami (yellow card) 29'; Iborra 43', 65', (yellow card) 44'; Vázquez 80'; Sarabia 90+2'	Stadium: El Sadar; Attendance: 15,211; Referee: Xavier Estrada Fernández

27 January 2017 20	Osasuna	1–1	Málaga	Pamplona
20:45 CET	Fernández (yellow card) 18'; Čaušić 76'	Report	Camacho 79'	Stadium: El Sadar; Attendance: 14,327; Referee: Ricardo de Burgos Bengoetxea

5 February 2017 21	Real Sociedad	3–2	Osasuna	San Sebastián
18:30 CET	Berchiche (yellow card) 5'; Navas 62'; Vela 72'; Illarramendi (yellow card) 75'; Juanmi 77'	Report	Kodro 25'; Čaušić (yellow card) 50'; León 79'; Torres (yellow card) 90'	Stadium: Anoeta; Attendance: 21,893; Referee: Santiago Jaime Latre

11 February 2017 22	Osasuna	1–3	Real Madrid	Pamplona
20:45 CET	Fuentes (yellow card) 10'; León 33'; Fausto (yellow card) 37'; Čaušić (yellow card) 90+1'	Report	Ronaldo 24'; Modrić (yellow card) 28'; Rodríguez (yellow card) 61'; Isco 62'; Vázquez 90+3'	Stadium: El Sadar; Attendance: 17,770; Referee: Ignacio Iglesias Villanueva

19 February 2017 23	Celta Vigo	3–0	Osasuna	Vigo
18:30 CET	Sisto 23'; Jonny (yellow card) 80'; Jozabed 87'; Aspas 89'	Report		Stadium: Balaídos; Attendance: 15,556; Referee: Vicandi Garrido

26 February 2017 24	Espanyol	3–0	Osasuna	Cornellà de Llobregat
12:00 CET	Caicedo 17' (penalty missed); López (yellow card) 24'; Jurado 46'; Gerard 90+1'	Report	Rivière (yellow card) 24'; D. García (yellow card) 25'; Oier (red card) 27'; Berenguer (yellow card) 71'; Mérida (yellow card) 76'	Stadium: RCDE Stadium; Attendance: 18,766; Referee: Carlos Clos Gómez

1 March 2017 25	Osasuna	1–4	Villarreal	Pamplona
19:30 CET	Berenguer (yellow card) 25'; Torres 64' (pen.), (yellow card) 77'; León (yellow card) 78'	Report	Soriano 2', (yellow card) 72'; Soldado (yellow card) 26', (goal) 27' (pen.); Rukavina (yellow card) 36'; Santos Borré 74', 78'	Stadium: El Sadar; Referee: José González González

5 March 2017 26	Las Palmas	5–2	Osasuna	Las Palmas
18:30 CET	Jesé 7', 87'; Livaja (yellow card) 18', (goal) 55'; Boateng (yellow card) 19'; Mesa (yellow card) 22' (goal) 76'; Castellano (yellow card) 43'; U. García 70' (o.g.)	Report	D. García (yellow card) 11'; Kenan Kodro 31', 37', (yellow card) 63'; Mérida (yellow card) 75'; Loé (yellow card) 82'	Stadium: Gran Canaria; Referee: Carlos del Cerro Grande

13 March 2017 27	Osasuna	1–1	Eibar	Pamplona
20:45 CET	Fuentes (yellow card) 42'; Torres (yellow card) 48'; Kodro 79'; Romero (yellow card) 82'; Loé (yellow card) 89'	Report	García (yellow card) 70'; Kike 72'; Arbilla (yellow card) 81'; Capa (yellow card) 84'; Ramis (yellow card) 89'	Stadium: El Sadar; Referee: Santiago Jaime Latre

18 March 2017 28	Real Betis	2–0	Osasuna	Seville
20:45 CET	Navarro 4'; Castro 28'	Report	Kodro (yellow card) 8'; Mérida (yellow card) 51'; Buñuel (yellow card) 60'	Stadium: Benito Villamarín; Attendance: 32,375; Referee: Alfonso Álvarez Izquierdo

1 April 2017 29	Osasuna	1–2	Athletic Bilbao	Pamplona
16:15 CET	Riera (yellow card) 22'; Mérida (yellow card) 36'; Oier (yellow card) 60'; León 79'; Clerc (yellow card) 81'	Report	Aduriz 12'; Muniain (yellow card) 34'; Williams 44'; De Marcos (yellow card) 84'	Stadium: El Sadar; Attendance: 15,755; Referee: José Luis Munuera Montero

5 April 2017 30	Alavés	0–1	Osasuna	Vitoria-Gasteiz
20:30 CET	Torres (yellow card) 35'; Romero (yellow card) 50'; R. García (yellow card) 62'; Ely (yellow card) 80'; Femenía (yellow card) 82'	Report	Oier (yellow card) 32'; Berenguer 88'	Stadium: Mendizorrotza; Attendance: 18,344; Referee: Xavier Estrada Fernández

9 April 2017 31	Osasuna	2–1	Leganés	Pamplona
18:30 CEST	Fausto (yellow card) 24'; León 36' (pen.), 71'; Olavide (yellow card) 60'; Čaušić (yellow card) 64'	Report	Rico (yellow card) 13'; Siovas 16'; Gabriel (yellow card) 34'; Tito (yellow card) 36'; Morán (yellow card) 89'	Stadium: El Sadar; Attendance: 14,421; Referee: Daniel Ocón Arráiz

15 April 2017 32	Atlético Madrid	3–0	Osasuna	Madrid
18:30 CEST	Giménez (yellow card) 25'; Carrasco 30', 47'; Filipe Luís 61'	Report	Kodro (yellow card) 43'; Oier (yellow card) 54'; Sirigu (yellow card) 88'; Fuentes (yellow card) 90'; De las Cuevas (yellow card) 90'	Stadium: Vicente Calderón Stadium; Attendance: 43,757; Referee: Mario Melero López

22 April 2017 33	Osasuna	2–2	Sporting Gijón	Pamplona
18:30 CEST	Meré 19' (o.g.); Fausto (yellow card) 49'; Kodro 72', (yellow card) 73'; Fuentes (yellow card) 90+1'	Report	Gómez (yellow card) 36'; Álvarez (yellow card) 45'; Meré (yellow card) 62'; Burgui (yellow card) 71'; Canella 79'; Castro 81'	Stadium: El Sadar; Attendance: 15,026; Referee: Jesús Gil Manzano

26 April 2017 34	Barcelona	7–1	Osasuna	Barcelona
19:30 CEST	Messi 12', 61'; Gomes 30', 57'; Alcácer 64', 86'; Mascherano 67'	Report	Torres 48'	Stadium: Camp Nou; Attendance: 62,453; Referee: José Luis Munuera Montero

30 April 2017 35	Osasuna	2–2	Deportivo La Coruña	Pamplona
12:00 CEST	Mondragón 4'; Buñuel (yellow card) 13'; Oier (yellow card) 17'; Juanfran 78' (o.g.)	Report	Guilherme (yellow card) 2', (goal) 18', 70'; Albentosa (yellow card) 75'; Arribas (yellow card) 90+2'	Stadium: El Sadar; Attendance: 12,294; Referee: Alejandro Hernández Hernández

7 May 2017 36	Valencia	4–1	Osasuna	Valencia
16:15 CEST	Garay 22', 45'; Gayà (yellow card) 60'; Zaza (yellow card) 64', (goal) 70'; Rodrigo 75'; Montoya (yellow card) 90+1'	Report	D. García (yellow card) 47'; Fuentes (yellow card) 77'; Olavide 90+2'	Stadium: Mestalla; Attendance: 24,752; Referee: Carlos Clos Gómez

13 May 2017 37	Osasuna	2–1	Granada	Pamplona
18:30 CET	Mondragón 24'; Kodro 75'; León (yellow card) 90+3'	Summary	Ramos 41'; Hongla (yellow card) 55'; Foulquier (yellow card) 67'; Agbo (yellow card) 86'	Stadium: El Sadar; Attendance: 13,301; Referee: Iñaki Vicandi Garrido

20 May 2017 38	Sevilla	5–0	Osasuna	Seville
21:00 CET	Vitolo 10', 80'; Vázquez 20', 60'; Jovetić (yellow card) 29', (goal) 35'; Nzonzi (yellow card) 62'; Kranevitter (yellow card) 67'	Summary	Oier (yellow card) 56'	Stadium: Ramón Sánchez Pizjuán; Attendance: 26,472; Referee: Carlos del Cerro Grande

==== Copa del Rey ====
===== Round of 32 =====
30 November 2016 First leg	Granada	1–0	Osasuna	Granada
21:00 CET	Toral 52'	Report		Stadium: Los Cármenes; Attendance: 8,872; Referee: Iñaki Vicandi Garrido

21 December 2016 Second leg	Osasuna	2–0 (2–1 agg.)	Granada	Pamplona
21:00 CET	Berenguer 45'; Romero 59'; U. García (yellow card) 75'; Riera (yellow card) 86'; Fernández (yellow card) 87'	Report		Stadium: El Sadar; Attendance: 9,464; Referee: Carlos del Cerro Grande

===== Round of 16 =====
3 January 2017 First leg	Osasuna	0–3	Eibar	Pamplona
19:00 CET	I. García (yellow card) 45'; Riera (yellow card) 86'	Report	Nano 28'; Arbilla (yellow card) 41'; Rivera (yellow card) 60'; Bebé 75'; Adrián 90'	Stadium: El Sadar; Attendance: 12,651; Referee: José González González

12 January 2017 Second leg	Eibar	0–0 (3–0 agg.)	Osasuna	Eibar
19:00 CET	Escalante (yellow card) 69'	Report	D. García (yellow card) 54'; Oier (yellow card) 83'	Stadium: Ipurua; Attendance: 3,627; Referee: Santiago Jaime Latre
