= 2015–16 CA Osasuna season =

CA Osasuna
2015–16 season
- President: Luis Sabalza
- Head coach: Enrique Martín
- Stadium: El Sadar
- Segunda División: 6th (promoted via play-offs)
- Copa del Rey: Second round
Home colours	Away colours

The 2015–16 season was the 96th season in the existence of CA Osasuna and the club's second consecutive season in the second division of Spanish football. In addition to the domestic league, CA Osasuna participated in this season's edition of the Copa del Rey.

== Players ==
=== First-team squad ===
As of 1 February 2016

Note: Flags indicate national team as defined under FIFA eligibility rules; some limited exceptions apply. Players may hold more than one non-FIFA nationality.

No.	Pos.	Nation	Player
1	GK	ESP	Mario Fernández
2	DF	ESP	Javier Flaño
3	DF	DOM	Tano Bonnín
4	DF	ESP	Miguel Flaño (Captain)
5	MF	ESP	David García
6	DF	ESP	Oier (vice-captain)
7	FW	ESP	Nino
8	MF	ESP	Mikel Merino
10	MF	ESP	Roberto Torres
11	FW	ESP	Urko Vera
13	GK	ESP	Nauzet Pérez
14	MF	ESP	Maikel Mesa

No.	Pos.	Nation	Player
15	DF	ESP	Unai García
16	MF	ESP	Manuel Sánchez
19	FW	ESP	Kenan Kodro
20	MF	ESP	Miguel de las Cuevas
21	MF	SLO	Matej Pučko (on loan from Koper)
23	DF	POR	Luís Martins (on loan from Granada)
31	FW	ESP	José García
33	MF	ESP	Álex Berenguer
34	DF	ESP	Aitor Buñuel
35	MF	ESP	Miguel Olavide
36	MF	ESP	Antonio Otegui

== Pre-season and friendlies ==
Win Draw Loss

31 July 2015 Friendly	Osasuna (Spain)	1–0	(Spain) Eibar	Olite, Spain
19:00 CEST (UTC+2)				Stadium: Estadio San Miguel

2 August 2015 Friendly	Osasuna (Spain)	2–0	(Spain) Athletic Bilbao	Pamplona, Spain
19:00 CEST (UTC+2)				Stadium: Estadio El Sadar

9 August 2015 Friendly	Real Unión (Spain)	2–1	(Spain) Osasuna	Irun, Spain
19:00 CEST (UTC+2)				Stadium: Stadium Gal

13 August 2015 Friendly	Osasuna (Spain)	0–1	(Spain) Zaragoza	Tajonar, Spain
18:30 CEST (UTC+2)				Stadium: Instalaciones Deportivas de Tajonar

15 August 2015 Friendly	Osasuna (Spain)	3–2	(Spain) Mirandés	Pamplona, Spain
19:00 CEST (UTC+2)				Stadium: Estadio El Sadar

== Competitions ==
=== Overall record ===
Competition	First match	Last match	Starting round	Final position	Record							
Competition	First match	Last match	Starting round	Final position	Pld	W	D	L	GF	GA	GD	Win %
Segunda División	22 August 2015	4 June 2016	Matchday 1	6th	42	17	13	12	47	40	+7	40.48
Segunda División promotion play-offs	8 June 2016	18 June 2016	Semi-finals	Winners	4	4	0	0	9	4	+5	100.00
Copa del Rey	9 September 2015		Second round	Second round	1	1	0	0	2	1	+1	100.00
Total					47	22	13	12	58	45	+13	46.81

Source: Soccerway

=== Segunda División ===
==== League table ====
Pos	Team	Pld	W	D	L	GF	GA	GD	Pts	Promotion, qualification or relegation
4	Girona	42	17	15	10	46	28	+18	66	Qualification to promotion play-offs
5	Córdoba	42	19	8	15	59	52	+7	65	Qualification to promotion play-offs
6	Osasuna (O, P)	42	17	13	12	47	40	+7	64 (Note: Osasuna ahead of Alcorcón and Zaragoza on head-to-head record; Osasuna 7 points, Alcorcón 6 points, Zaragoza 4 points)	Qualification to promotion play-offs
7	Alcorcón	42	18	10	14	48	44	+4	64	
8	Zaragoza	42	17	13	12	50	44	+6	64	

Source: LFP
Rules for classification: 1) points; 2) head-to-head points; 3) head-to-head goal difference; 4) goal difference; 5) number of goals scored
(O) Play-off winners; (P) Promoted

==== Results summary ====
Overall								Home						Away					
Pld	W	D	L	GF	GA	GD	Pts	W	D	L	GF	GA	GD	W	D	L	GF	GA	GD
42	17	13	12	47	40	+7	64	9	9	3	26	14	+12	8	4	9	21	26	−5

Source: La Liga Adelante

==== Results by round ====
Round	1	2	3	4	5	6	7	8	9	10	11	12	13	14	15	16	17	18	19	20	21	22	23	24	25	26	27	28	29	30	31	32	33	34	35	36	37	38	39	40	41	42
Ground	A	H	A	H	A	H	H	A	H	A	H	A	H	A	H	A	H	A	H	A	H	H	A	H	A	H	A	A	H	A	H	A	H	A	H	A	H	A	H	A	H	A
Result	W	W	L	W	W	D	W	L	W	D	L	L	W	W	L	L	D	W	D	W	D	W	L	D	L	D	W	L	W	L	D	D	D	D	W	W	D	D	W	L	L	W
Position	3	3	5	2	1	1	1	1	1	1	2	3	1	1	2	4	5	4	5	5	4	3	5	5	7	8	5	6	4	7	5	7	7	9	6	6	5	6	4	4	7	6

Source: La Liga Adelante
A = Away; H = Home; W = Win; D = Draw; L = Loss

==== Matches ====
The league fixtures were announced on 14 July 2015.

22 August 2015 1	Llagostera	0–2	Osasuna	Llagostera
--:-- CEST (UTC+2)

30 August 2015 2	Osasuna	1–0	Mirandés	Pamplona
--:-- CEST (UTC+2)

6 September 2015 3	Almería	2–1	Osasuna	Almería
--:-- CEST (UTC+2)

12 September 2015 4	Osasuna	2–1	Leganés	Pamplona
--:-- CEST (UTC+2)

20 September 2015 5	Zaragoza	0–1	Osasuna	Zaragoza
--:-- CEST (UTC+2)

26 September 2015 6	Osasuna	0–0	Alcorcón	Pamplona
--:-- CEST (UTC+2)

4 October 2015 7	Osasuna	4–0	Lugo	Pamplona
--:-- CEST (UTC+2)

10 October 2015 8	Alavés	3–0	Osasuna	Vitoria-Gasteiz
--:-- CET (UTC+1)

17 October 2015 9	Osasuna	1–0	Albacete	Pamplona
--:-- CET (UTC+1)

25 October 2015 10	Tenerife	2–2	Osasuna	Santa Cruz de Tenerife
--:-- CET (UTC+1)

1 November 2015 11	Osasuna	0–1	Girona	Pamplona
--:-- CET (UTC+1)

8 November 2015 12	Elche	2–1	Osasuna	Elche
--:-- CET (UTC+1)

15 November 2015 13	Osasuna	2–1	Mallorca	Pamplona
--:-- CET (UTC+1)

22 November 2015 14	Valladolid	0–1	Osasuna	Valladolid
--:-- CET (UTC+1)

28 November 2015 15	Osasuna	1–2	Alcorcón	Pamplona
--:-- CET (UTC+1)

6 December 2015 16	Ponferradina	3–0	Osasuna	Ponferrada
--:-- CET (UTC+1)

13 December 2015 17	Osasuna	1–1	Bilbao Athletic	Pamplona
--:-- CET (UTC+1)

19 December 2015 18	Numancia	1–3	Osasuna	Soria
--:-- CET (UTC+1)

2 January 2016 19	Osasuna	1–1	Gimnàstic	Pamplona
--:-- CET (UTC+1)

10 January 2016 20	Huesca	0–1	Osasuna	Huesca
--:-- CET (UTC+1)

16 January 2016 21	Osasuna	0–0	Oviedo	Pamplona
--:-- CET (UTC+1)

24 January 2016 22	Osasuna	3–0	Llagostera	Pamplona
--:-- CET (UTC+1)

31 January 2016 23	Mirandés	4–0	Osasuna	Miranda de Ebro
--:-- CET (UTC+1)

7 February 2016 24	Osasuna	0–0	Almería	Pamplona
--:-- CET (UTC+1)

14 February 2016 25	Leganés	2–0	Osasuna	Leganés
--:-- CET (UTC+1)

21 February 2016 26	Osasuna	1–1	Zaragoza	Pamplona
--:-- CET (UTC+1)

27 February 2016 27	Córdoba	0–1	Osasuna	Córdoba
--:-- CET (UTC+1)

5 March 2016 28	Lugo	2–0	Osasuna	Lugo
--:-- CET (UTC+1)

13 March 2016 29	Osasuna	3–1	Alavés	Pamplona
--:-- CET (UTC+1)

19 March 2016 30	Albacete	3–1	Osasuna	Albacete
--:-- CET (UTC+1)

26 March 2016 31	Osasuna	0–0	Tenerife	Pamplona
--:-- CET (UTC+1)

3 April 2016 32	Girona	0–0	Osasuna	Girona
17:00 CEST (UTC+2)		Report		Stadium: Montilivi; Referee: José Ramón Piñeiro Crespo

10 April 2016 33	Osasuna	0–0	Elche	Pamplona
--:-- CET (UTC+1)

17 April 2016 34	Mallorca	1–1	Osasuna	Palma
--:-- CEST (UTC+2)

24 April 2016 35	Osasuna	1–0	Valladolid	Pamplona
--:-- CET (UTC+1)

30 April 2016 36	Alcorcón	0–1	Osasuna	Alcorcón
--:-- CEST (UTC+2)

7 May 2016 37	Osasuna	0–0	Ponferradina	Pamplona
--:-- CET (UTC+1)

15 May 2016 38	Bilbao Athletic	0–0	Osasuna	Bilbao
--:-- CEST (UTC+2)				Stadium: San Mamés

22 May 2016 39	Osasuna	3–2	Numancia	Pamplona
--:-- CET (UTC+1)

25 May 2016 40	Gimnàstic	1–0	Osasuna	Tarragona
--:-- CEST (UTC+2)

29 May 2016 41	Osasuna	2–3	Huesca	Pamplona
--:-- CET (UTC+1)

4 June 2016 42	Oviedo	0–5	Osasuna	Oviedo
--:-- CEST (UTC+2)

==== Promotion play-offs ====
15 June 2016 F First leg	Osasuna	2–1	Girona	Pamplona
20:00		Report		Stadium: El Sadar

18 June 2016 F Second leg	Girona	0–1 (1–3 agg.)	Osasuna	Girona
19:00		Report		Stadium: Montilivi

=== Copa del Rey ===
9 September 2015 Second round	Mirandés	1–2	Osasuna	Miranda de Ebro, Spain
20:30 CEST (UTC+2)	Salinas 52'		Olavide 16'; Mesa 26'	Stadium: Anduva; Attendance: 3,369; Referee: Eiriz Mata
Note: Osasuna were disqualified from the tournament for fielding an ineligible player.
