= 2016 Segunda División play-offs =

Segunda División play-offs
- Season: 2015–16
- Promoted: Osasuna
- Matches played: 6
- Goals scored: 20 (3.33 per match)

The 2016 Segunda División play-offs will take place in June 2016 and will determine the third team which will be promoted to the top division. Teams placed between 3rd and 6th position (excluding reserve teams) will take part in the promotion play-offs.

The regulations are the same as the previous season: in the semifinals the fifth placed team faces the fourth, while the sixth placed team faces the third. Each tie is played over two legs, with each team playing one leg at home. The team that scores more goals on aggregate over the two legs advances to the next round. If the aggregate score is level, the away goals rule is applied, i.e., the team that scores more goals away from home over the two legs advances. If away goals are also equal, then thirty minutes of extra time is played. The away goals rule is again applied after extra time, i.e., if there are goals scored during extra time and the aggregate score is still level, the visiting team advances by virtue of more away goals scored. If no goals are scored during extra time, the winner will be the best positioned team in the regular season.

== Road to the playoffs ==
Pos	Team	Pld	W	D	L	GF	GA	GD	Pts	Promotion, qualification or relegation
3	Gimnàstic	42	18	17	7	57	41	+16	71	Qualification to promotion play-offs
4	Girona	42	17	15	10	46	28	+18	66	Qualification to promotion play-offs
5	Córdoba	42	19	8	15	59	52	+7	65	Qualification to promotion play-offs
6	Osasuna (O, P)	42	17	13	12	47	40	+7	64 (Note: Osasuna ahead of Alcorcón and Zaragoza on head-to-head record; Osasuna 7 points, Alcorcón 6 points, Zaragoza 4 points)	Qualification to promotion play-offs

Source: LFP
Rules for classification: 1) points; 2) head-to-head points; 3) head-to-head goal difference; 4) goal difference; 5) number of goals scored
(O) Play-off winners; (P) Promoted

== Promotion play-offs ==
The first leg of the semi-finals will be played on 8 and 9 June and the second leg on 11 and 12 June at home of the best positioned team. The final will also be two-legged, with the first leg on 15 June and the second leg on 18 June, with the best positioned team also playing the second leg at home.

Semifinals
5	Córdoba	2	1	3
4	Girona	1	3	4
6	Osasuna	3	3	6
3	Gimnàstic	1	2	3

Final
4	Girona	1	0	1
6	Osasuna	2	1	3

=== Semifinals ===
Team 1	Agg.	Team 2	1st leg	2nd leg
Osasuna	6–3	Gimnàstic	3–1	3–2
Córdoba	3–4	Girona	2–1	1–3 (a.e.t.)

==== First leg ====
8 June 2016
20:00 CEST

Osasuna	3–1	Gimnàstic
Merino 33', 41'; Kodro 58'	Summary	Jean Luc 68'

El Sadar, Pamplona
Attendance: 16,793
Referee: Trujillo Suárez

Osasuna	Gimnàstic

GK	13	(Spain) Nauzet Pérez
CB	4	(Spain) Miguel Flaño
CB	5	(Spain) David García
CB	3	(Dominican Republic) Tano Bonnín
RWB	6	(Spain) Oier
LWB	2	(Spain) Javier Flaño
CM	10	(Spain) Roberto Torres	(yellow card) 70'	(substituted off) 77'
CM	16	(Spain) Manuel Sánchez
CM	8	(Spain) Mikel Merino		(substituted off) 84'
CF	19	(Spain) Kenan Kodro	(yellow card) 86'
CF	20	(Spain) Miguel de las Cuevas		(substituted off) 85'
Substitutions:
GK	1	(Spain) Mario Fernández
FW	11	(Spain) Urko Vera
MF	14	(Spain) Maikel Mesa		(substituted in) 84'
DF	15	(Spain) Unai García
MF	21	(Slovenia) Matej Pučko		(substituted in) 85'
MF	33	(Spain) Álex Berenguer		(substituted in) 77'
MF	35	(Spain) Miguel Olavide
Manager:
(Spain) Enrique Martín

GK	1	(Spain) Manolo Reina
DF	2	(Spain) Gerard Valentín	(yellow card) 90+2'
DF	18	(Japan) Daisuke Suzuki
DF	4	(Spain) Xavi Molina
DF	3	(Spain) Mossa	(yellow card) 74'	(substituted off) 86'
MF	23	(Spain) Sergio Tejera
MF	24	(Gabon) Lévy Madinda	(yellow card) 70'
RW	11	(Spain) Cristian Lobato		(substituted off) 62'
AM	14	(Spain) Juan Muñiz		(substituted off) 62'
LW	28	(Spain) Naranjo
CF	25	(Cameroon) Achille Emaná
Substitutions:
DF	5	(Spain) Xisco Campos
MF	6	(Spain) Manolo Martínez
FW	9	(Spain) Álex López		(substituted in) 62'
MF	12	(Ivory Coast) Jean Luc		(substituted in) 62'
DF	17	(Spain) Iago Bouzón	(yellow card) 68'
FW	21	(Spain) Ferrán Giner		(substituted in) 86'
GK	40	(Cameroon) Fabrice Ondoa
Manager:
(Spain) Vicente Moreno

9 June 2016
20:00 CEST

Córdoba	2–1	Girona
Xisco 9', 12'	Summary	Herrera 30'

Nuevo Arcángel, Córdoba
Attendance: 14,800
Referee: Ocón Arraiz

Córdoba	Girona

GK	1	(Ghana) Brimah Razak
RB	17	(Lithuania) Marius Stankevičius	(yellow card) 68'
CB	4	(Spain) Héctor Rodas	(yellow card) 37'
CB	15	(Spain) Deivid
LB	3	(Spain) Domingo Cisma
RM	22	(Spain) Nando García	(yellow card) 56'	(substituted off) 88'
CM	6	(Spain) Luso
CM	21	(Spain) Carlos Caballero	(yellow card) 45+1'
LM	16	(Spain) Fidel
CF	20	(Spain) Raúl de Tomás		(substituted off) 64'
CF	9	(Spain) Xisco	(yellow card) 45+1'	(substituted off) 71'
Substitutions:
MF	5	(Spain) Víctor Pérez		(substituted in) 64'
FW	7	(Chile) Jean Paul Pineda		(substituted in) 71'
MF	11	(Azerbaijan) Eddy Israfilov
GK	13	(Spain) Ismael Falcón
MF	14	(Spain) Rafa Gálvez
MF	19	(Spain) López Silva		(substituted in) 88'
DF	24	(Spain) Albert Dalmau
Manager:
(Spain) José Luis Oltra

GK	13	(Spain) Isaac Becerra
CB	5	(Spain) Pedro Alcalá
CB	7	(Spain) Richy
CB	22	(Spain) Kiko Olivas	(yellow card) 53'
RWB	17	(Spain) Carlos Clerc
LWB	15	(Spain) Pablo Maffeo	(yellow card) 49'
CM	6	(Spain) Álex Granell		(substituted off) 78'
CM	8	(Spain) Pere Pons
CM	24	(Spain) Borja García		(substituted off) 86'
CF	20	(Spain) Rubén Sobrino
CF	16	(Spain) Cristian Herrera		(substituted off) 80'
Substitutions:
GK	1	(Spain) Germán Parreño
FW	2	(Spain) Sebas Coris
FW	9	(Spain) Jaime Mata		(substituted in) 80'
MF	10	(Spain) Eloi Amagat		(substituted in) 78'
MF	11	(Spain) Aday Benítez
FW	14	(Spain) Rubén Alcaraz		(substituted in) 86'
FW	25	(Serbia) Dejan Lekić
Manager:
(Spain) Pablo Machín

==== Second leg ====
11 June 2016
19:00 CEST

Gimnàstic	2–3	Osasuna
Naranjo 7'; Muñiz 79'	Summary	D. García 32'; Flaño 54'; Merino 74'

Nou Estadi, Tarragona
Attendance: 10,950
Referee: Cordero Vega

Gimnàstic	Osasuna

GK	1	(Spain) Manolo Reina
DF	2	(Spain) Gerard Valentín	(yellow card) 35'
DF	3	(Spain) Mossa
DF	18	(Japan) Daisuke Suzuki	(yellow card) 73'
DF	4	(Spain) Xavi Molina	(yellow card) 28'
MF	23	(Spain) Sergio Tejera	(yellow card) 37'
MF	24	(Gabon) Lévy Madinda	(yellow card) 53'	(substituted off) 59'
RW	11	(Spain) Cristian Lobato		(substituted off) 52'
AM	9	(Spain) Álex López		(substituted off) 75'
LW	28	(Spain) Naranjo
CF	25	(Cameroon) Achille Emaná
Substitutions:
MF	12	(Ivory Coast) Jean Luc		(substituted in) 52'
MF	14	(Spain) Juan Muñiz	(yellow card) 76'	(substituted in) 59'
MF	15	(Georgia (country)) Giorgi Aburjania
DF	17	(Spain) Iago Bouzón
FW	20	(Spain) Marcos de la Espada		(substituted in) 75'
FW	21	(Spain) Ferrán Giner
GK	40	(Cameroon) Fabrice Ondoa
Manager:
(Spain) Vicente Moreno

GK	13	(Spain) Nauzet Pérez
CB	4	(Spain) Miguel Flaño	(yellow card) 89'
CB	5	(Spain) David García	(yellow card) 89'
CB	3	(Dominican Republic) Tano Bonnín	(yellow card) 38'
RWB	6	(Spain) Oier		(substituted off) 61'
LWB	2	(Spain) Javier Flaño	(yellow card) 58'
CM	10	(Spain) Roberto Torres
CM	16	(Spain) Manuel Sánchez
CM	8	(Spain) Mikel Merino	(yellow card) 35'
CF	19	(Spain) Kenan Kodro		(substituted off) 72'
CF	20	(Spain) Miguel de las Cuevas		(substituted off) 64'
Substitutions:
GK	1	(Spain) Mario Fernández
FW	7	(Spain) Nino		(substituted in) 72'
FW	11	(Spain) Urko Vera
MF	14	(Spain) Maikel Mesa		(substituted in) 64'
DF	15	(Spain) Unai García	(yellow card) 66'	(substituted in) 61'
MF	21	(Slovenia) Matej Pučko
MF	33	(Spain) Álex Berenguer
Manager:
(Spain) Enrique Martín

12 June 2016
19:00 CEST

Girona	3–1 (a.e.t.)	Córdoba
B. García 65'; Aday 80'; Herrera 117'	Summary	Xisco 56'

Montilivi, Girona
Attendance: 8,552
Referee: Alberola Rojas

Girona	Córdoba

GK	13	(Spain) Isaac Becerra
CB	7	(Spain) Richy
CB	4	(France) Florian Lejeune	(yellow card) 63'
CB	22	(Spain) Kiko Olivas
RWB	17	(Spain) Carlos Clerc
MF	11	(Spain) Aday Benítez		(substituted off) 87'
CM	8	(Spain) Pere Pons
MF	10	(Spain) Eloi Amagat		(substituted off) 46'
CM	24	(Spain) Borja García
CF	16	(Spain) Cristian Herrera
FW	25	(Serbia) Dejan Lekić		(substituted off) 46'
Substitutions:
GK	1	(Spain) Germán Parreño
FW	5	(Spain) Pedro Alcalá
CM	6	(Spain) Álex Granell	(yellow card) 117'	(substituted in) 46'
FW	9	(Spain) Jaime Mata
FW	14	(Spain) Rubén Alcaraz
RB	15	(Spain) Pablo Maffeo		(substituted in) 87'
FW	20	(Spain) Rubén Sobrino	(yellow card) 64'	(substituted in) 46'
Manager:
(Spain) Pablo Machín

GK	1	(Ghana) Brimah Razak
RB	17	(Lithuania) Marius Stankevičius	(yellow card) 75' (yellow-red card) 94'
CB	4	(Spain) Héctor Rodas
CB	15	(Spain) Deivid	(yellow card) 104'
LB	3	(Spain) Domingo Cisma
RM	22	(Spain) Nando García		(substituted off) 68'
CM	6	(Spain) Luso		(substituted off) 97'
CM	21	(Spain) Carlos Caballero
LM	16	(Spain) Fidel
CF	20	(Spain) Raúl de Tomás
CF	9	(Spain) Xisco		(substituted off) 73'
Substitutions:
MF	5	(Spain) Víctor Pérez	(yellow card) 113'	(substituted in) 73'
FW	7	(Chile) Jean Paul Pineda		(substituted in) 97'
MF	11	(Azerbaijan) Eddy Israfilov
GK	13	(Spain) Ismael Falcón
MF	14	(Spain) Rafa Gálvez
FW	18	(Spain) Pedro Ríos		(substituted in) 68'
DF	24	(Spain) Albert Dalmau
Manager:
(Spain) José Luis Oltra

=== Final ===
Team 1	Agg.	Team 2	1st leg	2nd leg
Osasuna	3–1	Girona	2–1	1–0

First leg

15 June 2016
20:00 CEST

Osasuna	2–1	Girona
Kodro 6'; Maikel 78'	Summary	Olivas 73'

El Sadar, Pamplona
Attendance: 18,391
Referee: José Luis Munuera Montero

Osasuna	Girona

GK	13	(Spain) Nauzet Pérez	(yellow card) 90+1'
CB	4	(Spain) Miguel Flaño	(yellow card) 20'
CB	5	(Spain) David García	(yellow card) 90'
CB	3	(Dominican Republic) Tano Bonnín
RWB	6	(Spain) Oier
LWB	2	(Spain) Javier Flaño
CM	10	(Spain) Roberto Torres		(substituted off) 80'
CM	16	(Spain) Manuel Sánchez
CM	8	(Spain) Mikel Merino
CF	19	(Spain) Kenan Kodro		(substituted off) 46'
CF	20	(Spain) Miguel de las Cuevas		(substituted off) 64'
Substitutions:
GK	1	(Spain) Mario Fernández
FW	7	(Spain) Nino		(substituted in) 46'
FW	11	(Spain) Urko Vera
MF	14	(Spain) Maikel Mesa		(substituted in) 64'
DF	15	(Spain) Unai García
MF	21	(Slovenia) Matej Pučko		(substituted in) 80'
MF	33	(Spain) Álex Berenguer
Manager:
(Spain) Enrique Martín

GK	13	(Spain) Isaac Becerra
CB	4	(France) Florian Lejeune
CB	22	(Spain) Kiko Olivas
RWB	17	(Spain) Carlos Clerc
RB	15	(Spain) Pablo Maffeo
CM	8	(Spain) Pere Pons
CM	24	(Spain) Borja García	(substituted off) 90+2'
CM	6	(Spain) Álex Granell
FW	9	(Spain) Jaime Mata	(substituted off) 81'
CF	16	(Spain) Cristian Herrera	(substituted off) 54'
FW	5	(Spain) Pedro Alcalá
Substitutions:
GK	1	(Spain) Germán Parreño
CB	7	(Spain) Richy	(substituted in) 90+2'
ACM	10	(Spain) Eloi Amagat
FW	14	(Spain) Rubén Alcaraz	(substituted in) 81'
FW	20	(Spain) Rubén Sobrino	(substituted in) 54'
MF	21	(Spain) Pol Llonch
MF	23	(Spain) Javier Álamo
Manager:
(Spain) Pablo Machín

Second leg

18 June 2016
19:00 CEST

Girona	0–1	Osasuna
	Summary	Kodro 48'

Montilivi, Girona
Attendance: 9,108
Referee: Arias López

Girona	Osasuna

GK	13	(Spain) Isaac Becerra
CB	22	(Spain) Kiko Olivas
CB	7	(Spain) Richy		(substituted off) 74'
CB	4	(France) Florian Lejeune	(yellow card) 80' (yellow-red card) 88'
RWB	11	(Spain) Aday Benítez		(substituted off) 70'
LWB	17	(Spain) Carlos Clerc
CM	8	(Spain) Pere Pons
CM	6	(Spain) Álex Granell
CM	24	(Spain) Borja García
CF	16	(Spain) Cristian Herrera		(substituted off) 70'
CF	20	(Spain) Rubén Sobrino
Substitutions:
GK	1	(Spain) Germán Parreño
DF	5	(Spain) Pedro Alcalá
FW	9	(Spain) Jaime Mata		(substituted in) 70'
MF	10	(Spain) Eloi Amagat
DF	15	(Spain) Pablo Maffeo
MF	23	(Spain) Javier Álamo		(substituted in) 70'
MF	25	(Serbia) Dejan Lekić		(substituted in) 74'
Manager:
(Spain) Pablo Machín

GK	13	(Spain) Nauzet Pérez
CB	5	(Spain) David García
CB	4	(Spain) Miguel Flaño
CB	3	(Dominican Republic) Tano Bonnín
RWB	6	(Spain) Oier	(yellow card) 32'
LWB	2	(Spain) Javier Flaño
CM	10	(Spain) Roberto Torres		(substituted off) 73'
CM	16	(Spain) Manuel Sánchez	(yellow card) 56'
CM	8	(Spain) Mikel Merino
CF	20	(Spain) Miguel de las Cuevas		(substituted off) 57'
CF	19	(Spain) Kenan Kodro		(substituted off) 75'
Substitutions:
GK	1	(Spain) Mario Fernández
FW	7	(Spain) Nino		(substituted in) 73'
FW	11	(Spain) Urko Vera
MF	14	(Spain) Maikel Mesa		(substituted in) 57'
DF	15	(Spain) Unai García		(substituted in) 75'
MF	21	(Slovenia) Matej Pučko
MF	33	(Spain) Álex Berenguer
Manager:
(Spain) Enrique Martín

Promoted to La Liga
Osasuna
(2 years later)
