= Antonio Otegui =

Spanish footballer

Personal information
- Full name: Antonio Islam Otegui Khalifi
- Date of birth: 7 March 1998 (age 28)
- Place of birth: Mendavia, Spain
- Height: 1.71 m (5 ft 7 in)
- Position: Midfielder

Team information
- Current team: Inter Club d'Escaldes
- Number: 14

Youth career
- Mendaviés
- Arenas Ayegui
- Izarra
- 2011–2015: Osasuna

Senior career*
Years	Team	Apps	(Gls)
2015–2020	Osasuna B	50	(3)
2015–2020	Osasuna	14	(0)
2018–2019	→ Melilla (loan)	36	(0)
2019–2020	→ Numancia (loan)	19	(0)
2020–2022	Badajoz	48	(1)
2023–2025	Tudelano	74	(2)
2025–	Inter Club d'Escaldes	21	(4)

International career
2016	Spain U18	2	(0)
2016	Spain U20	2	(1)
- * Club domestic league appearances and goals as of 14 June 2026

Antonio Islam Otegui Khalifi (born 7 March 1998) is a Spanish footballer who plays as a midfielder for Andorran club Inter Club d'Escaldes.

== Club career ==
Born in Mendavia, Navarre, Otegui was a CA Osasuna youth graduate. In the 2015 summer, he was called up straight to the main squad by manager Enrique Martín for the pre-season, and signed a new five-year deal with the club on 8 August of that year.

On 9 September 2015, without even appearing for the reserves, Otegui made his professional debut by coming on as a second-half substitute for fellow youth graduate José García in a 2–1 Copa del Rey away win against CD Mirandés. His Segunda División debut came on 17 October, again from the bench in a 1–0 home success over Albacete Balompié.

Otegui contributed with 11 appearances during the campaign, as his side achieved promotion to La Liga. He made his debut in the category on 17 October 2016, replacing Miguel de las Cuevas in a 3–2 away win against SD Eibar.

Otegui scored his first senior goal on 7 May 2017, netting the third for the B-side in a 3–0 home win against SD Ponferradina in the Segunda División B championship. On 10 August of the following year, he was loaned to UD Melilla in the third division for the season.

On 26 August 2019, Otegui joined CD Numancia in the second division, on loan for one year. Roughly one year later, he moved to third division side CD Badajoz. The next season, the move was permanent.

== Career statistics ==
=== Club ===
As of match played 2 October 2021

Appearances and goals by club, season and competition
Club	Season	League			National Cup		Other		Total	
Club	Season	Division	Apps	Goals	Apps	Goals	Apps	Goals	Apps	Goals
Osasuna B	2015–16	Tercera División	4	0	—		—		4	0
Osasuna B	2016–17	Segunda División B	17	1	—		—		17	1
Osasuna B	2017–18	Segunda División B	29	2	—		—		29	2
Osasuna B	Total		50	3	0	0	0	0	50	3
Osasuna	2015–16	Segunda División	11	0	1	0	—		12	0
Osasuna	2016–17	La Liga	3	0	2	0	—		5	0
Osasuna	2019–20	La Liga	0	0	0	0	—		0	0
Osasuna	Total		14	0	3	0	0	0	17	0
Melilla (loan)	2018–19	Segunda División B	36	0	4	0	4 (Note: Appearance(s) in Promotion Playoffs)	0	44	0
Numancia (loan)	2019–20	Segunda División	19	0	1	0	—		20	0
Badajoz	2020–21	Segunda División B	17	0	1	0	2	0	20	0
Badajoz	2021–22	Primera División RFEF	6	0	0	0	—		6	0
Badajoz	Total		23	0	3	0	0	0	26	0
Career total			142	3	9	0	6	0	157	3
