= Unai García =

Spanish footballer

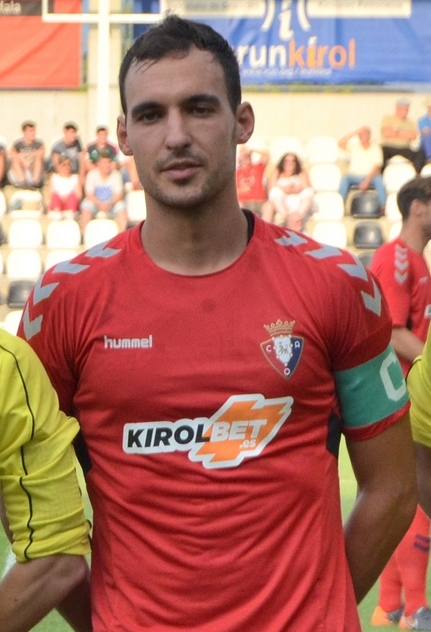
- García with Osasuna in 2018

Personal information
- Full name: Unai García Lugea
- Date of birth: 3 February 1992 (age 34)
- Place of birth: Ezcároz, Spain
- Height: 1.86 m (6 ft 1 in)
- Position: Centre-back

Team information
- Current team: Omonia Aradippou
- Number: 15

Youth career
- 2000–2011: Osasuna

Senior career*
Years	Team	Apps	(Gls)
2011–2015	Osasuna B	85	(7)
2013–2025	Osasuna	195	(11)
2015	→ Tudelano (loan)	16	(2)
2025–2026	Panetolikos	13	(0)
2026–	Omonia Aradippou	6	(0)

International career^{‡}
2025–	Basque Country	1	(0)
- * Club domestic league appearances and goals as of 01:37, 8 November 2026 (UTC) ‡ National team caps and goals as of 18:18, 13 December 2025 (UTC)

Unai García Lugea (born 3 February 1992) is a Spanish professional footballer who plays as a centre-back for Cypriot First Division club Omonia Aradippou.

== Club career ==
=== Osasuna ===
Born in Ezcároz – Ezkaroze, Navarre, García joined CA Osasuna's academy at the age of 8, making his senior debut in the 2011–12 season with the reserves in the Segunda División B. On 1 June 2013, he first appeared in La Liga with the first team, starting in a 4–2 away defeat against Real Madrid and being booked in the match.

On 28 January 2015, García was loaned to CD Tudelano until June. Upon his return, he was regularly used by manager Enrique Martín, and scored his first professional goal on 15 November in a 2–1 home win over RCD Mallorca.

García scored three times from 37 appearances in the 2018–19 campaign, as the club returned to the top flight as champions. He scored his first goal in the competition on 9 February, but in a 4–1 home loss to Real Madrid.

García made just five official appearances in 2024–25. During his 25-year spell (formative years included), he totalled 215.

=== Later career ===
On 16 June 2025, aged 33, García moved abroad and signed with Super League Greece side Panetolikos F.C. on a one-year contract. In summer 2026, he joined Omonia Aradippou of the Cypriot First Division.

== International career ==
García was called up to the Basque Country national team for a friendly against Palestine on 15 November 2025. He took part in the 3–0 win at San Mamés.

== Personal life ==
García's younger brother, Imanol, is also a footballer. A midfielder, he too was brought up at Osasuna.

== Career statistics ==
As of match played 22 May 2022

Appearances and goals by club, season and competition
Club	Season	League			National cup		Other		Total	
Club	Season	Division	Apps	Goals	Apps	Goals	Apps	Goals	Apps	Goals
Osasuna B	2011–12	Segunda División B	9	2	—		—		9	2
Osasuna B	2012–13	Segunda División B	34	3	—		—		34	3
Osasuna B	2013–14	Tercera División	32	2	—		2 (Note: Appearances in promotion playoffs)	0	34	2
Osasuna B	2014–15	Tercera División	10	0	—		—		10	0
Osasuna B	Total		85	7	0	0	2	0	87	7
Osasuna	2012–13	La Liga	1	0	0	0	—		1	0
Osasuna	2014–15	Segunda División	2	0	1	0	—		3	0
Osasuna	2015–16	Segunda División	27	2	1	0	2	0	30	2
Osasuna	2016–17	La Liga	22	0	2	0	—		24	0
Osasuna	2017–18	Segunda División	30	4	1	0	—		31	4
Osasuna	2018–19	Segunda División	37	3	0	0	—		37	3
Osasuna	2019–20	La Liga	8	1	4	0	—		12	1
Osasuna	2020–21	La Liga	17	0	4	0	—		21	0
Osasuna	2021–22	La Liga	18	0	1	0	—		19	0
Osasuna	Total		162	10	14	0	2	0	178	10
Tudelano (loan)	2014–15	Segunda División B	16	2	—		—		16	2
Career total			263	19	14	0	4	0	281	19

== Honours ==
Osasuna

- Segunda División: 2018–19
- Copa del Rey runner-up: 2022–23
