= Fausto Tienza =

Spanish footballer

Personal information
- Full name: Fausto Antonio Tienza Núñez
- Date of birth: 8 January 1990 (age 36)
- Place of birth: Talavera la Real, Spain
- Height: 1.83 m (6 ft 0 in)
- Position: Midfielder

Team information
- Current team: Amorebieta
- Number: 16

Youth career
- 2004–2009: Valencia

Senior career*
Years	Team	Apps	(Gls)
2007–2009	Valencia B	1	(0)
2009	→ La Nucía (loan)	14	(0)
2009–2010	→ Caravaca (loan)	6	(0)
2010–2011	→ La Muela (loan)	28	(0)
2011–2013	Melilla	31	(2)
2013–2014	Betis B	44	(2)
2013	Betis	1	(0)
2014–2016	Alcorcón	58	(3)
2016–2018	Osasuna	24	(0)
2018	Cádiz	5	(0)
2018–2019	Extremadura	30	(2)
2019–2021	Panathinaikos	0	(0)
2020–2021	→ Gimnàstic (loan)	27	(1)
2021–2023	Racing Santander	59	(3)
2023–2025	Ibiza	37	(3)
2025	Compostela	10	(0)
2025–	Amorebieta	26	(2)
- * Club domestic league appearances and goals as of 14 May 2026

Fausto Antonio Tienza Núñez (born 8 January 1990) is a Spanish professional footballer who plays for Segunda Federación club Amorebieta. Mainly a central midfielder, he can also play as a central defender.

== Club career ==
Born in Talavera la Real, Province of Badajoz, Fausto joined Valencia CF's youth system in 2004, aged 14. In 2006–07, while still a junior, he made his senior debut, playing one match for the reserves in the Segunda División B. In January 2009 he was loaned to neighbouring CF La Nucía and, six months later, moved to another Segunda B club Caravaca CF, also on loan.

In the 2010 summer, still owned by the Che, Fausto joined CD La Muela also in the third level, starting in all of his league appearances but suffering team relegation. On 27 August 2011, he rescinded with Valencia and signed with UD Melilla in the same category; he scored his first goal as a senior on 6 May 2012, against AD Ceuta.

On 12 January 2013, Fausto signed a contract with Real Betis, being assigned to the reserves. On 8 March he made his official debut with the Andalusians' first team, replacing Dorlan Pabón in the dying minutes of a 2–1 La Liga home win against CA Osasuna.

On 15 August 2014, Fausto signed a one-year deal with Segunda División club AD Alcorcón. He scored his first professional goal on 26 October, but in a 1–3 home loss against Real Zaragoza.

On 1 July 2016, Fausto signed a two-year deal with CA Osasuna, newly promoted to the main category. On 24 January 2018, he signed an 18-month contract with Cádiz CF in the second division, after cutting ties with his previous club.

On 9 July 2018, Fausto terminated his contract with Cádiz, and signed for fellow league team Extremadura UD eight days later.

On 12 September 2019, Fausto signed a two-year contract with Greek club Panathinaikos for an undisclosed fee. On the January transfer window, Fausto Tienza has officially returned to his native country. The 30-year-old has been heavily out of favour ever since joining the club only a few months ago. He only featured a mere 52 minutes for the club and has joined Gimnàstic de Tarragona in the Spanish third tier in a loan move until the end of this season.

On 27 May 2021, Fausto joined Racing de Santander in the third division.

=== Club ===
As of 13 March 2026

Appearances and goals by club, season and competition
Club	Season	League			National cup (Note: Includes Copa del Rey, Greek Cup)		Other		Total	
Club	Season	Division	Apps	Goals	Apps	Goals	Apps	Goals	Apps	Goals
Valencia B	2006–07	Segunda División B	1	0	—		—		1	0
Caravaca (loan)	2009–10	Segunda División B	6	0	0	0	—		6	0
La Muela (loan)	2010–11	Segunda División B	28	0	—		—		28	0
Melilla	2011–12	Segunda División B	15	1	0	0	—		15	1
Melilla	2012–13	Segunda División B	16	1	4	0	—		20	1
Melilla	Total		31	2	4	0	0	0	35	2
Betis B	2012–13	Segunda División B	12	0	—		—		12	0
Betis	2012–13	La Liga	1	0	0	0	—		1	0
Alcorcón	2014–15	Segunda División	35	2	0	0	—		35	2
Alcorcón	2015–16	Segunda División	23	0	1	0	—		24	0
Alcorcón	Total		58	2	1	0	0	0	59	2
Osasuna	2016–17	La Liga	19	0	3	0	—		22	0
Osasuna	2017–18	Segunda División	5	0	0	0	—		5	0
Osasuna	Total		24	0	3	0	0	0	27	0
Cádiz	2017–18	Segunda División	5	0	0	0	—		5	0
Extremadura	2018–19	Segunda División	30	2	0	0	—		30	2
Panathinaikos	2019–20	Super League Greece	0	0	2	0	—		2	0
Gimnàstic (loan)	2019–20	Segunda División B	4	0	0	0	—		4	0
Gimnàstic (loan)	2020–21	Segunda División B	18	1	—		6 (Note: Five appearances in Segunda División B Promotion Phase, one appearance in Copa Federación de España)	0	24	1
Gimnàstic (loan)	Total		22	1	0	0	6	0	28	1
Racing Santander	2021–22	Primera Federación	33	3	—		4 (Note: One appearance in Segunda División Promotion Playoffs, three appearances in Copa Federación de España)	0	37	3
Racing Santander	2022–23	Segunda División	26	0	1	0	—		27	0
Racing Santander	Total		59	3	1	0	4	0	67	3
Ibiza	2023–24	Primera Federación	34	3	1	0	1 (Note: Appearance in Segunda División Promotion Playoffs)	0	36	0
Ibiza	2024–25	Primera Federación	3	0	1	0	—		4	0
Ibiza	Total		37	3	2	0	1	0	40	3
Compostela	2024–25	Segunda Federación	10	0	—		—		10	0
Amorebieta	2025–26	Segunda Federación	22	1	—		—		22	1
Career total			346	14	13	0	11	0	370	14
