= Mario Fernández (footballer, born 1988) =

Spanish footballer

Personal information
- Full name: Mario Fernández Cuesta
- Date of birth: 30 April 1988 (age 38)
- Place of birth: Santander, Spain
- Height: 1.84 m (6 ft 0 in)
- Position: Goalkeeper

Team information
- Current team: Monte

Youth career
- 1996–2006: Racing Santander

Senior career*
| Years | Team | Apps | (Gls) |
| 2006–2010 | Racing B | 48 | (0) |
| 2010–2015 | Racing Santander | 91 | (0) |
| 2015–2017 | Osasuna | 7 | (0) |
| 2017–2018 | Rayo Vallecano | 1 | (0) |
| 2018–2019 | Cartagena | 11 | (0) |
| 2020 | Unionistas | 8 | (0) |
| 2020–2021 | Pontevedra | 15 | (0) |
| 2021–2024 | Tropezón | 77 | (0) |
| 2024– | Monte | 34 | (0) |

International career
| 2006 | Spain U19 | 3 | (0) |
- * Club domestic league appearances and goals as of 16:55, 12 November 2026 (UTC)

Mario Fernández Cuesta (born 30 April 1988) is a Spanish professional footballer who plays as a goalkeeper for CD Monte.

== Club career ==
=== Racing Santander ===
Born in Santander, Cantabria, Fernández was a product of Racing de Santander's youth ranks, and was promoted to the main squad for the 2009–10 season, acting as backup to established Toño and Fabio Coltorti. Benefitting from a serious injury to the former, he began being picked for some matches while also representing the reserves in the Segunda División B.

On 6 January 2010, Fernández made his official debut for Racing's first team, in a 3–2 away win against AD Alcorcón in the Copa del Rey; he also featured in the second leg (0–0 draw), adding another two appearances in the tournament as they reached the semi-finals. As the Cantabrians were already safe from relegation, and longtime first-choice Toño was suspended, he made his La Liga debut on 15 May 2011, earning player of the match accolades in the 2–1 loss at Sporting de Gijón.

=== Osasuna ===
On 4 August 2015, Fernández signed a two-year deal with CA Osasuna of Segunda División. Mainly a backup to Nauzet Pérez and later demoted to third choice after the arrival of Salvatore Sirigu, he left the club when his contract expired.

=== Rayo Vallecano ===
On 18 August 2017, free agent Fernández joined second-division club Rayo Vallecano on a one-year contract. He only managed two competitive appearances during his tenure at the Campo de Fútbol de Vallecas, with his side returning to the top flight after two years as champions.

=== Cartagena ===
Fernández returned to the third tier in the summer of 2018, with the 30-year-old signing for FC Cartagena.

== Career statistics ==
As of match played 26 January 2025

Appearances and goals by club, season and competition
| Club | Season | League | | | National Cup | | Continental | | Other | | Total | |
| Club | Season | Division | Apps | Goals | Apps | Goals | Apps | Goals | Apps | Goals | Apps | Goals |
|---|---|---|---|---|---|---|---|---|---|---|---|---|
| Racing B | 2005–06 | Segunda División B | 2 | 0 | — | | — | | — | | 2 | 0 |
| Racing B | 2008–09 | Segunda División B | 29 | 0 | — | | — | | — | | 29 | 0 |
| Racing B | 2009–10 | Segunda División B | 17 | 0 | — | | — | | — | | 17 | 0 |
| Racing B | Total | | 48 | 0 | — | | — | | — | | 48 | 0 |
| Racing Santander | 2008–09 | La Liga | 0 | 0 | 0 | 0 | 0 | 0 | — | | 0 | 0 |
| Racing Santander | 2009–10 | La Liga | 0 | 0 | 4 | 0 | — | | — | | 4 | 0 |
| Racing Santander | 2010–11 | La Liga | 1 | 0 | 1 | 0 | — | | — | | 2 | 0 |
| Racing Santander | 2011–12 | La Liga | 13 | 0 | 4 | 0 | — | | — | | 17 | 0 |
| Racing Santander | 2012–13 | Segunda División | 29 | 0 | 1 | 0 | — | | — | | 30 | 0 |
| Racing Santander | 2013–14 | Segunda División B | 16 | 0 | 5 | 0 | — | | 2 (Note: Appearances in Segunda División B play-offs) | 0 | 23 | 0 |
| Racing Santander | 2014–15 | Segunda División | 32 | 0 | 0 | 0 | — | | — | | 32 | 0 |
| Racing Santander | Total | | 91 | 0 | 15 | 0 | 0 | 0 | 2 | 0 | 108 | 0 |
| Osasuna | 2015–16 | Segunda División | 0 | 0 | 1 | 0 | — | | 0 | 0 | 1 | 0 |
| Osasuna | 2016–17 | La Liga | 7 | 0 | 4 | 0 | — | | — | | 11 | 0 |
| Osasuna | Total | | 7 | 0 | 5 | 0 | — | | 0 | 0 | 12 | 0 |
| Rayo Vallecano | 2017–18 | Segunda División | 1 | 0 | 1 | 0 | — | | — | | 2 | 0 |
| Cartagena | 2018–19 | Segunda División B | 11 | 0 | 0 | 0 | — | | 0 | 0 | 11 | 0 |
| Cartagena | 2019–20 | Segunda División B | 0 | 0 | 0 | 0 | — | | — | | 0 | 0 |
| Cartagena | Total | | 11 | 0 | 0 | 0 | — | | 0 | 0 | 11 | 0 |
| Unionistas | 2019–20 | Segunda División B | 8 | 0 | 0 | 0 | — | | — | | 8 | 0 |
| Pontevedra | 2020–21 | Segunda División B | 15 | 0 | 0 | 0 | — | | — | | 15 | 0 |
| Tropezón | 2021–22 | Segunda División RFEF | 22 | 0 | — | | — | | — | | 22 | 0 |
| Tropezón | 2022–23 | Tercera Federación | 28 | 0 | — | | — | | 3 (Note: Appearances in Tercera Federación play-offs) | 0 | 31 | 0 |
| Tropezón | 2023–24 | Tercera Federación | 27 | 0 | — | | — | | — | | 27 | 0 |
| Tropezón | Total | | 77 | 0 | — | | — | | — | | 80 | 0 |
| Monte | 2024–25 | Tercera Federación | 13 | 0 | — | | — | | — | | 13 | 0 |
| Career total | | | 271 | 0 | 21 | 0 | 0 | 0 | 5 | 0 | 297 | 0 |

== Honours ==
Rayo Vallecano

- Segunda División: 2017–18
