= Aitor Buñuel =

Spanish footballer

Personal information
- Full name: Aitor Buñuel Redrado
- Date of birth: 10 February 1998 (age 28)
- Place of birth: Tafalla, Spain
- Height: 1.73 m (5 ft 8 in)
- Position: Right-back

Youth career
- 2006–2015: Osasuna

Senior career*
Years	Team	Apps	(Gls)
2015–2017	Osasuna B	12	(0)
2015–2018	Osasuna	27	(1)
2018	→ Valencia B (loan)	16	(0)
2018–2020	Racing Santander	61	(2)
2020–2022	Almería	28	(0)
2022–2024	Tenerife	53	(0)
2024–2025	Racing Ferrol	28	(1)
2025–2026	Burgos	8	(0)

International career^{‡}
2016	Spain U18	2	(0)
2015–2017	Spain U19	8	(0)
2016	Spain U20	5	(1)
2019	Spain U21	4	(1)
- * Club domestic league appearances and goals as of 31 May 2026 ‡ National team caps and goals as of 14 November 2019

Aitor Buñuel Redrado (born 10 February 1998) is a Spanish footballer who plays as a right-back.

== Club career ==
Buñuel was born in Tafalla, Navarre. A CA Osasuna youth graduate, he was promoted to the main squad on 5 May 2015 by manager Enrique Martín.

On 16 May 2015, before even having appeared for the B-side, Buñuel made his professional debut, starting in a 1–1 Segunda División away draw against Real Valladolid. He scored his first goal in the category on 19 December, netting the first in a 3–1 win at CD Numancia.

On 19 August 2016 Buñuel made his La Liga debut, replacing Juan Rafael Fuentes in a 1–1 draw at Málaga CF. On 19 January 2018, he extended his contract for two years and was immediately loaned to Segunda División B side Valencia CF Mestalla for six months.

On 17 July 2018, Buñuel joined Racing de Santander on a two-year contract, and helped the club achieve promotion to the second division. On 15 September 2020, after suffering immediate relegation, he agreed to a two-year deal with UD Almería.

On 23 August 2022, free agent Buñuel signed a two-year contract with CD Tenerife, also in the second division. On 5 July 2024, he moved to fellow league team Racing de Ferrol.

On 12 September 2025, after suffering relegation, Buñuel agreed to a one-year deal with Burgos CF still in division two.

== Honours ==
Almería

- Segunda División: 2021–22
