= Manolín (footballer, born 1988) =

Spanish footballer

Personal information
- Full name: Manuel Sánchez López
- Date of birth: 13 September 1988 (age 38)
- Place of birth: Córdoba, Spain
- Height: 1.85 m (6 ft 1 in)
- Position: Defensive midfielder

Team information
- Current team: St Joseph's
- Number: 6

Youth career
- UDC Sur
- Séneca CF
- Córdoba

Senior career*
Years	Team	Apps	(Gls)
2007–2009	Écija	26	(1)
2009–2010	Poli Ejido	14	(1)
2010–2011	Córdoba B	30	(3)
2011–2012	La Unión	30	(4)
2012–2013	Guijuelo	33	(3)
2013–2014	La Hoya Lorca	30	(1)
2014–2016	Huesca	47	(2)
2016	Osasuna	8	(0)
2016	Alcorcón	5	(0)
2017	UCAM Murcia	12	(0)
2017–2020	Elche	84	(6)
2020–2021	Ávila	22	(2)
2022–2023	Europa	18	(5)
2023–	St Joseph's	57	(11)
- * Club domestic league appearances and goals as of 18:49, 11 April 2026 (UTC)

Manuel Sánchez López (born 13 September 1988), known as Manolín, is a Spanish professional footballer who plays for Gibraltar Football League club St Joseph's. Mainly a defensive midfielder, he can also play as a central defender.

== Club career ==
Born in Córdoba, Andalusia, Manolín graduated from Córdoba CF's youth academy, and made his debut as a senior with Écija Balompié in 2007, in the Segunda División B. On 2 August 2009, he moved to Polideportivo Ejido also of the third division.

On 31 August 2010, Manolín returned to Córdoba, being assigned to the reserves who competed in the Tercera División. In the summer of 2011, he signed with CF La Unión one league above.

Manolín remained in the third tier the following years, representing CD Guijuelo, La Hoya Lorca CF and SD Huesca. He appeared in 38 matches and scored two goals during the season with the latter club, as it returned to Segunda División after a two-year absence.

Manolín made his professional debut on 22 August 2015 at the age of 27, playing the full 90 minutes in a 2–3 home loss against Deportivo Alavés. On 10 January of the following year, after terminating his contract, he joined CA Osasuna also in the second division.

On 23 June 2016, having achieved promotion to La Liga as a starter in the play-offs, Manolín was released and signed with second-tier side AD Alcorcón. On 20 December, he became a free agent and joined UCAM Murcia CF of the same league three days later.

On 20 July 2017, Manolín agreed to a deal at Elche CF. He again promoted to the second division at the end of his debut campaign, contributing 34 games and four goals to the feat.

Manolín left the Estadio Martínez Valero on 28 August 2020, after another promotion. In September, he signed for amateurs Real Ávila CF.
