= Petar Vasiljević =

Serbian former footballer (born 1970)

Personal information
- Full name: Petar Vasiljević
- Date of birth: 3 November 1970 (age 55)
- Place of birth: Belgrade, SFR Yugoslavia
- Height: 1.86 m (6 ft 1 in)
- Position: Centre back

Senior career*
Years	Team	Apps	(Gls)
1989–1994	Partizan	102	(6)
1994–1995	Osasuna	51	(2)
1995–1999	Albacete	48	(1)
1999–2000	Osasuna	12	(2)
2000–2003	Rot Weiss Ahlen	46	(0)
2003–2004	Obilić	12	(0)
Total		271	(11)

Managerial career
- 2008–2010: Osasuna (assistant youth)
- 2017: Osasuna
- * Club domestic league appearances and goals

Petar "Peđa" Vasiljević (Serbian Cyrillic: Петар Пеђа Bacиљeвић; born 3 November 1970) is a Serbian retired footballer who played as a central defender.

== Football career ==
Born in Belgrade, Vasiljević started his career with local and national powerhouse FK Partizan, being an important part of the squad that won two national championships and as many Yugoslav Cups. In the 1994 summer he moved to Spain where he remained for the following six years, in representation of CA Osasuna (two spells) and Albacete Balompié.

Vasiljević's only season in La Liga was 1995–96, as he started in 21 of his 22 league appearances for Albacete, who ranked in 20th position and suffered relegation. After leaving the country in 2000, he played with Rot Weiss Ahlen in Germany and FK Obilić, returning later in the decade to Osasuna to work in several capacities (youth coach, co-director of football).

On 5 January 2017, Vasiljević became Osasuna's third manager of the top flight season after replacing fired Joaquín Caparrós. He signed until 30 June.

== Managerial statistics ==
As of 20 May 2017

Managerial record by team and tenure
Team	Nat	From	To	Record								Ref
Team	Nat	From	To	G	W	D	L	GF	GA	GD	Win %	Ref
Osasuna	(Spain)	5 January 2017	7 June 2017	23	3	7	13	27	60	−33	13.04	
Total				23	3	7	13	27	60	−33	13.04	—
