= Juan Rafael Fuentes =

Spanish footballer

Personal information
- Full name: Juan Rafael Fuentes Hernández
- Date of birth: 5 January 1990 (age 36)
- Place of birth: Córdoba, Spain
- Height: 1.78 m (5 ft 10 in)
- Position: Left-back

Youth career
- Córdoba

Senior career*
Years	Team	Apps	(Gls)
2008–2009	Córdoba B	33	(0)
2009–2013	Córdoba	113	(2)
2013–2016	Espanyol	67	(0)
2016–2017	Osasuna	17	(0)
2018	Nottingham Forest	1	(0)
Total		231	(2)
- * Club domestic league appearances and goals

Juan Rafael Fuentes Hernández (born 5 January 1990) is a Spanish former professional footballer who played as a left-back.

== Club career ==
=== Córdoba ===
Born in Córdoba, Andalusia, Fuentes made his professional debut with hometown club Córdoba CF on 10 October 2009, appearing in a 1–1 away draw against Real Murcia CF in the Segunda División. He was a first-team regular over the course of four seasons at that level, featuring in 30 games in 2011–12 (all starts) and 35 the following campaign.

Fuentes scored his first goal as a senior on 30 March 2013, helping the hosts to defeat CE Sabadell FC 3–0.

=== Espanyol ===
Fuentes joined La Liga side RCD Espanyol on 19 June 2013, on a four-year deal. He played his first match in the top flight on 19 August, starting in a 2–2 draw at RC Celta de Vigo.

=== Osasuna ===
On 11 August 2016, Fuentes signed for CA Osasuna also in the top tier. The following 27 July, after suffering relegation, he terminated his contract.

=== Nottingham Forest ===
On 8 February 2018, after six months without a club, Fuentes signed with Nottingham Forest which was managed by countryman Aitor Karanka. His only Championship appearance of the season took place on 24 April, when he played the first half of the 3–0 home win over Barnsley before breaking his leg.

Fuentes announced his retirement in December 2019, aged 29.
