= Jhon Mondragón =

Colombian footballer (born 1994)

Personal information
- Full name: Jhon Steven Mondragón Dosman
- Date of birth: 15 October 1994 (age 32)
- Place of birth: Tuluá, Colombia
- Height: 1.80 m (5 ft 11 in)
- Position: Right back

Team information
- Current team: Minaur Baia Mare
- Number: 4

Youth career
- –2009: Izarra
- 2009–2013: Osasuna

Senior career*
| Years | Team | Apps | (Gls) |
| 2013–2017 | Osasuna B | 99 | (1) |
| 2017 | Osasuna | 5 | (2) |
| 2017–2018 | Puebla | 2 | (0) |
| 2018 | Leones | 3 | (0) |
| 2019 | Sport Boys | 17 | (1) |
| 2020–2021 | Petrolul Ploiești | 10 | (0) |
| 2021 | FC Buzău | 4 | (0) |
| 2022–2023 | Minaur Baia Mare | 22 | (2) |
| 2023–2024 | CSM Slatina | 16 | (1) |
| 2024– | Minaur Baia Mare | 10 | (1) |
- * Club domestic league appearances and goals as of 08:04, 30 October 2024 (UTC)

Jhon Steven Mondragón Dosman (born 15 October 1994) is a Colombian footballer who plays for Romanian Liga III club Minaur Baia Mare. Mainly a right back, he can also play as a central defender or a central midfielder-

== Club career ==
=== Osasuna ===
Born in Tuluá, Steven moved from Tuluá to Navarre, Spain aged six years and finished his formation with CA Osasuna's youth setup. On 19 October 2013 he made his debut with the reserves, coming on as a substitute for Marc Nierga in a 3–0 Tercera División home win against CD Pamplona.

On 6 January 2016 Steven scored his first senior goal, netting the first in a 4–0 away routing of CD Mendi. He was an undisputed starter for the B-side during the campaign which ended in promotion, contributing 34 appearances. In the following season in the third tier, he was almost ever-present again (29 starts) before being promoted to the first team squad.

On 22 April 2017 Steven made his first team – and La Liga – debut, replacing injured Nikola Vujadinović in a 2–2 home draw against Sporting de Gijón. Eight days later he scored his first goal in the category, netting the first in a 2–2 home draw against Deportivo de La Coruña, and found the net again in his next appearance against Granada C.F., opening the scoring in a 2–1 victory. Nevertheless, at the season's end, Osasuna were relegated from the top division and Steven's contract was not renewed.

=== Puebla ===
After some weeks without a club, in September 2017 Steven signed for Liga MX team Club Puebla.

== Honours ==
CA Osasuna B

- Tercera División: 2015–16

Minaur Baia Mare

- Liga III: 2021–22
