= Nauzet Pérez =

Spanish footballer

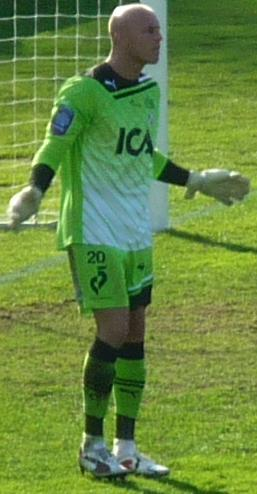
- Pérez playing for Halmstad

Personal information
- Full name: Cecilio Nauzet Pérez González
- Date of birth: 1 March 1985 (age 41)
- Place of birth: Las Palmas, Spain
- Height: 1.90 m (6 ft 3 in)
- Position: Goalkeeper

Youth career
- Maspalomas
- Las Palmas

Senior career*
Years	Team	Apps	(Gls)
2002–2005	Las Palmas	15	(0)
2003–2004	→ Lleida (loan)	2	(0)
2005–2007	Málaga B	19	(0)
2007	Orientación Marítima	9	(0)
2007–2008	Jaén	0	(0)
2008–2009	Fuerteventura	11	(1)
2009–2010	Mallorca B	27	(0)
2010	Ceuta	11	(0)
2011	Halmstad	7	(0)
2011–2012	Mirandés	25	(0)
2012–2015	Sabadell	114	(0)
2015–2017	Osasuna	59	(0)
2017–2018	APOEL	26	(0)
2018–2019	Las Palmas	4	(0)
2019–2021	Recreativo	50	(0)
2021	Linares Deportivo	9	(0)
2022	Cartaya	13	(0)
2022–2023	Unión Puerto	25	(0)
2023–2025	Unión Sur Yaiza	61	(1)

International career
2001–2002	Spain U17	11	(0)
- * Club domestic league appearances and goals

Cecilio Nauzet Pérez González (born 1 March 1985) is a Spanish professional footballer who plays as a goalkeeper.

== Club career ==
Born in Las Palmas, Canary Islands, Pérez started his career with CD Maspalomas before moving to local rivals UD Las Palmas to finish his development. In the 2002–03 season, aged 17, he played three games with the latter's main squad in the Segunda División, his first appearance being on 31 August 2002 in a 2–0 home win against Racing de Ferrol.

After a loan spell in the Segunda División B with UE Lleida, Pérez returned to the second division for the 2005–06 campaign, being backup with Málaga CF's reserves and suffering relegation. He left the club in late January 2007 and continued his career in division three, appearing for five teams and being relegated with CD Orientación Marítima and UD Fuerteventura; during his spell with the latter, on 5 October 2008, he scored from a goal kick in the 2–0 away victory over Águilas CF.

Pérez left AD Ceuta in December 2010, as both parties agreed on terminating the contract. On 23 February of the following year, he signed with Swedish club Halmstads BK.

On 29 May 2011, both Pérez and his compatriot Iván Díaz were released by Halmstads; it was announced that several factors both on and off the pitch were the reason for the rescision. He returned to his country in the summer, joining third-tier CD Mirandés and being an instrumental part in the side's semi-final run in the Copa del Rey.

In 2012, Pérez moved to CE Sabadell FC of the second division. On 27 July 2015, after their relegation, he agreed to a one-year contract at CA Osasuna in the same league.

Pérez played all the matches and minutes in 2015–16 as the Navarrese returned to La Liga after two years. On 14 July 2016 he agreed to a new two-year deal, making his debut in the competition on 19 August at the age of 31 when he started a 1–1 away draw against Málaga CF.

On 28 July 2017, having been immediately relegated, Pérez terminated his contract with Osasuna. On 22 October, he signed with Cypriot club APOEL FC where he shared teams with compatriots Roberto Lago and Jesús Rueda. His maiden appearance in the UEFA Champions League took place on 1 November, when he helped to a 1–1 group stage away draw with Borussia Dortmund.

== Career statistics ==
As of match played 23 June 2024

Appearances and goals by club, season and competition
Club	Season	League			National Cup		Europe		Other		Total	
Club	Season	Division	Apps	Goals	Apps	Goals	Apps	Goals	Apps	Goals	Apps	Goals
Orientación Marítima	2006–07	Segunda División B	9	0	0	0	—		—		9	0
Jaén	2007–08	Segunda División B	0	0	0	0	—		—		0	0
Fuerteventura	2008–09	Segunda División B	11	1	1	0	—		—		12	1
Mallorca B	2009–10	Segunda División B	27	0	—		—		—		27	0
Mallorca	2008–09	La Liga	0	0	0	0	—		—		0	0
Mallorca	2009–10	La Liga	0	0	0	0	—		—		0	0
Mallorca	Total		0	0	0	0	—		0	0	51	0
Ceuta	2010–11	Segunda División B	11	0	3	0	—		—		14	0
Halmstads	2011–12	Segunda División B	7	0	—		—		—		7	0
Mirandés	2011–12	Segunda División B	22	0	9	0	—		3	0	34	0
Sabadell	2012–13	Segunda División	37	0	2	0	—		—		39	0
Sabadell	2013–14	Segunda División	39	0	1	0	—		—		40	0
Sabadell	2014–15	Segunda División	38	0	3	0	—		—		41	0
Sabadell	Total		114	0	6	0	—		—		120	0
Osasuna	2015–16	Segunda División	42	0	0	0	—		4	0	46	0
Osasuna	2016–17	La Liga	13	0	1	0	—		—		14	0
Osasuna	Total		55	0	1	0	—		4	0	60	0
APOEL	2017–18	Cypriot First Division	26	0	0	0	3	0	—		29	0
Las Palmas	2018–19	Segunda División	4	0	1	0	—		—		5	0
Recreativo	2019–20	Segunda División B	27	0	1	0	—		—		28	0
Recreativo	2020–21	Segunda División B	23	0	—		—		0	0	23	0
Recreativo	Total		50	0	1	0	—		0	0	51	0
Linares Deportivo	2021–22	Primera División RFEF	9	0	—		—		—		9	0
Cartaya	2021–22	Tercera División RFEF	13	0	—		—		—		13	0
Unión Puerto	2022–23	Tercera Federación	25	0	—		—		—		25	0
Sur Yaiza	2023–24	Tercera Federación	34	0	—		—		2	0	36	0
Career total			417	0	22	0	3	0	6	0	448	0
