= 2016–17 La Liga =

86th season of La Liga

La Liga
- Season: 2016–17
- Dates: 20 August 2016 – 21 May 2017
- Champions: Real Madrid; 33rd title
- Relegated: Sporting Gijón; Osasuna; Granada
- Champions League: Real Madrid; Barcelona; Atlético Madrid; Sevilla
- Europa League: Villarreal; Real Sociedad; Athletic Bilbao
- Matches: 380
- Goals: 1,118 (2.94 per match)
- Top goalscorer: Lionel Messi (37 goals)
- Best goalkeeper: Jan Oblak (0.72 goals/match)
- Biggest home win: Atlético Madrid 7–1 Granada (15 October 2016); Barcelona 7–1 Osasuna (26 April 2017)
- Biggest away win: Alavés 0–6 Barcelona (11 February 2017)
- Highest scoring: Sevilla 6–4 Espanyol (20 August 2016)
- Longest winning run: 7 matches Barcelona
- Longest unbeaten run: 19 matches Barcelona
- Longest winless run: 21 matches Osasuna
- Longest losing run: 8 matches Granada
- Highest attendance: 95,961; Barcelona 1–1 Real Madrid (3 December 2016)
- Lowest attendance: 3,576; Eibar 1–0 Valencia (27 August 2016)
- Total attendance: 10,557,782
- Average attendance: 27,859

The 2016–17 La Liga season, also known as LaLiga Santander for sponsorship reasons, was the 86th since its establishment. The season began on 19 August 2016 and concluded on 21 May 2017.

Real Madrid secured the title following their away victory at Málaga on the final matchday, finishing with 93 points and winning a record-extending 33rd championship, their first since the 2011–12 season. Barcelona finished second, three points behind Real Madrid. Real became only the second side after Barcelona in 2012–13 to score in all 38 games of a La Liga season.

== Name sponsorship ==
The Spanish top flight dropped the sponsorship from BBVA and was now called LaLiga, while the second division was called LaLiga2. The league made this change to maximize the La Liga brand. On 20 July, Banco Santander was appointed as the new sponsor.

== Teams ==
Location of teams in 2016–17 La Liga
Location of Community of Madrid teams in 2016–17 La Liga
Location of teams in 2016–17 La Liga (Canary Islands)

=== Promotion and relegation (pre-season) ===
A total of 20 teams contested the league, including 17 sides from the 2015–16 season and three promoted from the 2015–16 Segunda División. This included the two top teams from the Segunda División, and the winners of the play-offs.

Deportivo Alavés was the first team from Segunda División to achieve promotion, after a ten-year absence from La Liga, on 29 May 2016 after winning 2–0 against CD Numancia. CD Leganés was promoted as the runners-up after winning 1–0 at CD Mirandés in the last match-day, on 4 June 2016. This was Leganés' first promotion to the top division. CA Osasuna was the last to be promoted after beating Gimnàstic de Tarragona and Girona FC in the play-offs. The Reds returned to La Liga two years after their last relegation.

The three promoted clubs replaced Rayo Vallecano, Getafe, and Levante, who were relegated at the end of the previous season after five, twelve, and six years respectively.

=== Stadia and locations ===
Team	Location	Stadium	Capacity
Alavés	Vitoria-Gasteiz	Mendizorrotza	19,840
Athletic Bilbao	Bilbao	San Mamés	53,289
Atlético Madrid	Madrid	Vicente Calderón	54,907
Barcelona	Barcelona	Camp Nou	99,354
Celta Vigo	Vigo	Balaídos	29,000
Deportivo La Coruña	A Coruña	Riazor	32,912
Eibar	Eibar	Ipurua	7,083
Espanyol	Barcelona	RCDE Stadium	40,500
Granada	Granada	Nuevo Los Cármenes	22,094
Las Palmas	Las Palmas	Gran Canaria	33,111
Leganés	Leganés	Butarque	10,922
Málaga	Málaga	La Rosaleda	30,044
Osasuna	Pamplona	El Sadar	18,761
Real Betis	Seville	Benito Villamarín	51,700
Real Madrid	Madrid	Santiago Bernabéu	85,454
Real Sociedad	San Sebastián	Anoeta	32,000
Sevilla	Seville	Ramón Sánchez Pizjuán	42,714
Sporting Gijón	Gijón	El Molinón	29,029
Valencia	Valencia	Mestalla	55,000
Villarreal	Villarreal	Estadio de la Cerámica	24,890

=== Personnel and sponsorship ===
Team	Manager	Captain	Kit manufacturer	Shirt sponsor
Alavés	(Argentina) Mauricio Pellegrino	(Spain) Manu García	Hummel	LEA, Álava,^{1}, Kutxabank^{2}, Euskaltel^{3}, Heraclio Fournier ^{3}
Athletic Bilbao	(Spain) Ernesto Valverde	(Spain) Gorka Iraizoz	Nike	Kutxabank
Atlético Madrid	(Argentina) Diego Simeone	(Spain) Gabi	Nike	Plus500
Barcelona	(Spain) Luis Enrique	(Spain) Andrés Iniesta	Nike	Qatar Airways, UNICEF,^{1} Beko^{2}
Celta Vigo	(Argentina) Eduardo Berizzo	(Spain) Hugo Mallo	Adidas	Estrella Galicia 0,0, Luckia,^{1}, Abanca^{3}
Deportivo La Coruña	(Spain) Pepe Mel	(Spain) Laure	Lotto	Estrella Galicia 0,0
Eibar	(Spain) José Luis Mendilibar	(Spain) Dani García	Puma	AVIA, Wiko^{1}^{3}
Espanyol	(Spain) Quique Sánchez Flores	(Spain) Javi López	Joma	Rastar Group, Riviera Maya^{3}
Granada	(England) Tony Adams	(France) Dimitri Foulquier	Joma	Energy King, Covirán^{1}
Las Palmas	(Spain) Quique Setién	(Spain) David García	Acerbis	Gran Canaria, IOC,^{1} beCordial,^{3} Volkswagen,^{3} Domingo Alonso^{3}
Leganés	(Spain) Asier Garitano	(Argentina) Martín Mantovani	Joma	Royal Jordanian, MBuzz Sport, GoldenPark^{1}
Málaga	(Spain) Míchel	(Portugal) Duda	Nike	Marathonbet, Benahavís^{1}
Osasuna	(Serbia) Petar Vasiljević	(Spain) Miguel Flaño	Adidas	Victorino Vicente^{2}
Real Betis	(Spain) Alexis Trujillo (interim)	(Spain) Joaquín	Adidas	Wiko^{1}^{3}
Real Madrid	(France) Zinedine Zidane	(Spain) Sergio Ramos	Adidas	Fly Emirates
Real Sociedad	(Spain) Eusebio Sacristán	(Spain) Xabi Prieto	Adidas	Qbao.com
Sevilla	(Argentina) Jorge Sampaoli	(Spain) Vicente Iborra	New Balance	SeePuertoRico.com
Sporting Gijón	(Spain) Rubi	(Spain) Alberto Lora	Nike	Gijón, Nissan,^{3} Telecable,^{3} CMP,^{1} Halcón Viajes^{2}
Valencia	(Spain) Voro	(Argentina) Enzo Pérez	Adidas	beIN Sports^{1}
Villarreal	(Spain) Fran Escribá	(Spain) Bruno	Joma	Pamesa Cerámica

1. On the back of shirt.
2. On the sleeves.
3. On the shorts.

=== Managerial changes ===
Team	Outgoing manager	Manner of departure	Date of vacancy	Position in table	Incoming manager	Date of appointment
Málaga	(Spain) Javi Gracia	Signed by Rubin Kazan	24 May 2016	Pre-season	(Spain) Juande Ramos	28 May 2016
Espanyol	(Romania) Constantin Gâlcă	Sacked	27 May 2016	Pre-season	(Spain) Quique Sánchez Flores	9 June 2016
Deportivo La Coruña	(Spain) Víctor Sánchez	Sacked	30 May 2016	Pre-season	(Spain) Gaizka Garitano	10 June 2016
Sevilla	(Spain) Unai Emery	Resigned	12 June 2016	Pre-season	(Argentina) Jorge Sampaoli	13 June 2016
Granada	(Spain) José González	End of contract	20 June 2016	Pre-season	(Spain) Paco Jémez	20 June 2016
Alavés	(Spain) José Bordalás	Sacked	21 June 2016	Pre-season	(Argentina) Mauricio Pellegrino	26 June 2016
Villarreal	(Spain) Marcelino	Sacked	10 August 2016	Pre-season	(Spain) Fran Escribá	11 August 2016
Valencia	(Spain) Pako Ayestarán	Sacked	20 September 2016	20th	(Italy) Cesare Prandelli	28 September 2016
Granada	(Spain) Paco Jémez	Sacked	28 September 2016	19th	(Spain) Lucas Alcaraz	3 October 2016
Osasuna	(Spain) Enrique Martín	Sacked	7 November 2016	19th	(Spain) Joaquín Caparrós	8 November 2016
Real Betis	(Uruguay) Gustavo Poyet	Sacked	11 November 2016	14th	(Spain) Víctor Sánchez	11 November 2016
Málaga	(Spain) Juande Ramos	Resigned	22 December 2016	11th	(Uruguay) Marcelo Romero	28 December 2016
Valencia	(Italy) Cesare Prandelli	Resigned	30 December 2016	17th	(Spain) Voro	10 January 2017
Osasuna	(Spain) Joaquín Caparrós	Sacked	5 January 2017	20th	(Serbia) Petar Vasiljević	5 January 2017
Sporting Gijón	(Spain) Abelardo Fernández	Mutual consent	17 January 2017	18th	(Spain) Rubi	17 January 2017
Deportivo La Coruña	(Spain) Gaizka Garitano	Sacked	27 February 2017	17th	(Spain) Pepe Mel	27 February 2017
Málaga	(Uruguay) Marcelo Romero	Sacked	7 March 2017	15th	(Spain) Míchel	7 March 2017
Granada	(Spain) Lucas Alcaraz	Sacked	10 April 2017	19th	(England) Tony Adams	10 April 2017
Real Betis	(Spain) Víctor Sánchez	Sacked	9 May 2017	15th	(Spain) Alexis Trujillo (interim)	9 May 2017

== League table ==
=== Standings ===
Pos	Team	Pld	W	D	L	GF	GA	GD	Pts	Qualification or relegation
1	Real Madrid (C)	38	29	6	3	106	41	+65	93	Qualification for the Champions League group stage
2	Barcelona	38	28	6	4	116	37	+79	90	Qualification for the Champions League group stage
3	Atlético Madrid	38	23	9	6	70	27	+43	78	Qualification for the Champions League group stage
4	Sevilla	38	21	9	8	69	49	+20	72	Qualification for the Champions League play-off round
5	Villarreal	38	19	10	9	56	33	+23	67	Qualification for the Europa League group stage (Note: Since the winners of the 2016–17 Copa del Rey, Barcelona, qualified for European competition based on league position, the spot awarded to the cup winners (Europa League group stage) was passed to the sixth-placed team and the spot awarded to the sixth-placed team (Europa League third qualifying round) was passed to the seventh-placed team.)
6	Real Sociedad	38	19	7	12	59	53	+6	64	Qualification for the Europa League group stage
7	Athletic Bilbao	38	19	6	13	53	43	+10	63	Qualification for the Europa League third qualifying round
8	Espanyol	38	15	11	12	49	50	−1	56	
9	Alavés	38	14	13	11	41	43	−2	55	
10	Eibar	38	15	9	14	56	51	+5	54	
11	Málaga	38	12	10	16	49	55	−6	46 (Note: Málaga ahead of Valencia on head-to-head points: Valencia–Málaga 2–2, Málaga–Valencia 2–0)	
12	Valencia	38	13	7	18	56	65	−9	46	
13	Celta Vigo	38	13	6	19	53	69	−16	45	
14	Las Palmas	38	10	9	19	53	74	−21	39 (Note: Las Palmas ahead of Real Betis on head-to-head goal difference: Las Palmas–Real Betis 4–1, Real Betis–Las Palmas 2–0)	
15	Real Betis	38	10	9	19	41	64	−23	39	
16	Deportivo La Coruña	38	8	12	18	43	61	−18	36	
17	Leganés	38	8	11	19	36	55	−19	35	
18	Sporting Gijón (R)	38	7	10	21	42	72	−30	31	Relegation to Segunda División
19	Osasuna (R)	38	4	10	24	40	94	−54	22	Relegation to Segunda División
20	Granada (R)	38	4	8	26	30	82	−52	20	Relegation to Segunda División

Source: La Liga, Soccerway
Rules for classification: 1) Points; 2) Head-to-head points; 3) Head-to-head goal difference; 4) Goal difference; 5) Goals scored; 6) Fair-play points; 7) Play-off.
(C) Champions; (R) Relegated

=== Results ===
Home \ Away	ALV	ATH	ATM	FCB	CEL	RCD	EIB	ESP	GCF	LPA	LEG	MCF	OSA	RBB	RMA	RSO	SFC	RSG	VCF	VIL
Alavés	—	1–0	0–0	0–6	3–1	0–0	0–0	0–1	3–1	1–1	2–2	1–1	0–1	1–0	1–4	1–0	1–1	0–0	2–1	2–1
Athletic Bilbao	0–0	—	2–2	0–1	2–1	2–1	3–1	2–0	3–1	5–1	1–1	1–0	1–1	2–1	1–2	3–2	3–1	2–1	2–1	1–0
Atlético Madrid	1–1	3–1	—	1–2	3–2	1–0	1–0	0–0	7–1	1–0	2–0	4–2	3–0	1–0	0–3	1–0	3–1	5–0	3–0	0–1
Barcelona	1–2	3–0	1–1	—	5–0	4–0	4–2	4–1	1–0	5–0	2–1	0–0	7–1	6–2	1–1	3–2	3–0	6–1	4–2	4–1
Celta Vigo	1–0	0–3	0–4	4–3	—	4–1	0–2	2–2	3–1	3–1	0–1	3–1	3–0	0–1	1–4	2–2	0–3	2–1	2–1	0–1
Deportivo La Coruña	0–1	0–1	1–1	2–1	0–1	—	2–1	1–2	0–0	3–0	1–2	2–0	2–0	1–1	2–6	5–1	2–3	2–1	1–1	0–0
Eibar	0–0	0–1	0–2	0–4	1–0	3–1	—	1–1	4–0	3–1	2–0	3–0	2–3	3–1	1–4	2–0	1–1	0–1	1–0	2–1
Espanyol	1–0	0–0	0–1	0–3	0–2	1–1	3–3	—	3–1	4–3	3–0	2–2	3–0	2–1	0–2	1–2	3–1	2–1	0–1	0–0
Granada	2–1	1–2	0–1	1–4	0–3	1–1	1–2	1–2	—	1–0	0–1	0–2	1–1	4–1	0–4	0–2	2–1	0–0	1–3	1–1
Las Palmas	1–1	3–1	0–5	1–4	3–3	1–1	1–0	0–0	5–1	—	1–1	1–0	5–2	4–1	2–2	0–1	0–1	1–0	3–1	1–0
Leganés	1–1	0–0	0–0	1–5	0–2	4–0	1–1	0–1	1–0	3–0	—	0–0	2–0	4–0	2–4	0–2	2–3	0–2	1–2	0–0
Málaga	1–2	2–1	0–2	2–0	3–0	4–3	2–1	0–1	1–1	2–1	4–0	—	1–1	1–2	0–2	0–2	4–2	3–2	2–0	0–2
Osasuna	0–1	1–2	0–3	0–3	0–0	2–2	1–1	1–2	2–1	2–2	2–1	1–1	—	1–2	1–3	0–2	3–4	2–2	3–3	1–4
Real Betis	1–4	1–0	1–1	1–1	3–3	0–0	2–0	0–1	2–2	2–0	2–0	1–0	2–0	—	1–6	2–3	1–2	0–0	0–0	0–1
Real Madrid	3–0	2–1	1–1	2–3	2–1	3–2	1–1	2–0	5–0	3–3	3–0	2–1	5–2	2–1	—	3–0	4–1	2–1	2–1	1–1
Real Sociedad	3–0	0–2	2–0	1–1	1–0	1–0	2–2	1–1	2–1	4–1	1–1	2–2	3–2	1–0	0–3	—	0–4	3–1	3–2	0–1
Sevilla	2–1	1–0	1–0	1–2	2–1	4–2	2–0	6–4	2–0	2–1	1–1	4–1	5–0	1–0	2–1	1–1	—	0–0	2–1	0–0
Sporting Gijón	2–4	2–1	1–4	0–5	1–1	0–1	2–3	1–1	3–1	1–0	2–1	0–1	3–1	2–2	2–3	1–3	1–1	—	1–2	1–3
Valencia	2–1	2–0	0–2	2–3	3–2	3–0	0–4	2–1	1–1	2–4	1–0	2–2	4–1	2–3	2–1	2–3	0–0	1–1	—	1–3
Villarreal	0–2	3–1	3–0	1–1	5–0	0–0	2–3	2–0	2–0	2–1	2–1	1–1	3–1	2–0	2–3	2–1	0–0	3–1	0–2	—

Source: La Liga, RFEF
Legend: Blue = home team win; Yellow = draw; Red = away team win.

== Season statistics ==
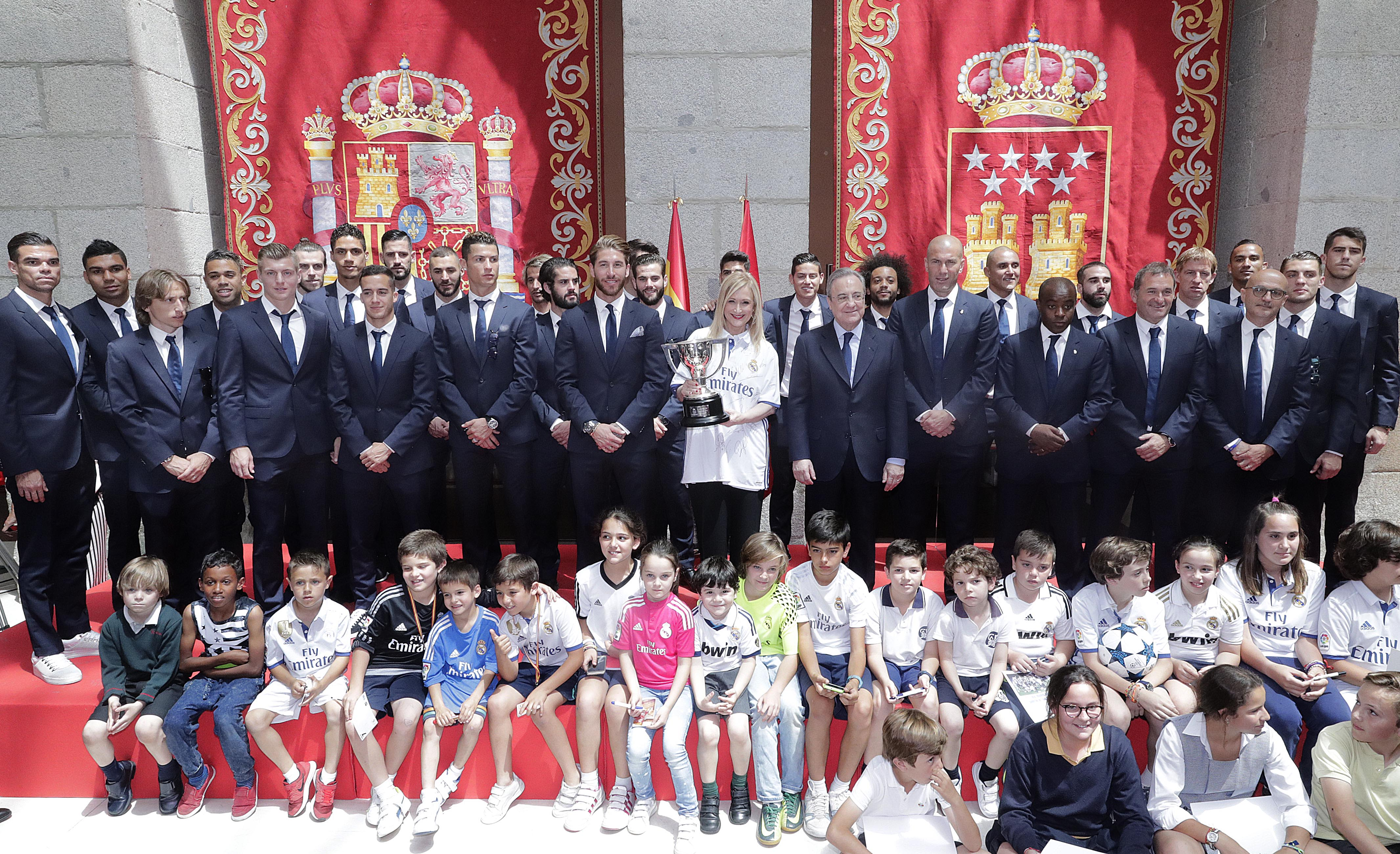
La Liga champions Real Madrid celebrate their win with Community of Madrid President Cristina Cifuentes.

=== Scoring ===
- First goal of the season:
  (Venezuela) Juanpi for Málaga against Osasuna (19 August 2016)
- Last goal of the season:
  (Argentina) Lionel Messi for Barcelona against Eibar (21 May 2017)

=== Top goalscorers ===
Rank	Player	Club	Goals
1	(Argentina) Lionel Messi	Barcelona	37
2	(Uruguay) Luis Suárez	Barcelona	29
3	(Portugal) Cristiano Ronaldo	Real Madrid	25
4	(Spain) Iago Aspas	Celta Vigo	19
5	(Spain) Aritz Aduriz	Athletic Bilbao	16
5	(France) Antoine Griezmann	Atlético Madrid	16
7	(Spain) Álvaro Morata	Real Madrid	15
8	(Spain) Sandro Ramírez	Málaga	14
9	(Spain) Rubén Castro	Real Betis	13
9	(Spain) Gerard Moreno	Espanyol	13
9	(Brazil) Neymar	Barcelona	13

=== Top assists ===
Rank	Player	Club	Assists
1	(Uruguay) Luis Suárez	Barcelona	13
2	(Germany) Toni Kroos	Real Madrid	12
3	(Brazil) Neymar	Barcelona	11
4	(Brazil) Marcelo	Real Madrid	10
4	(Argentina) Pablo Piatti	Espanyol	10
6	(Argentina) Lionel Messi	Barcelona	9
7	(Argentina) Ángel Correa	Atlético Madrid	8
7	(France) Antoine Griezmann	Atlético Madrid	8
7	(Spain) Isco	Real Madrid	8
7	(Spain) Koke	Atlético Madrid	8
7	(Spain) Pablo Sarabia	Sevilla	8

=== Zamora Trophy ===
The Ricardo Zamora Trophy was awarded by newspaper Marca to the goalkeeper with the lowest ratio of goals conceded to matches played. A goalkeeper had to play at least 28 matches of 60 or more minutes to be eligible for the trophy.

Rank	Player	Club	Goals against	Matches	Average
1	(Slovenia) Jan Oblak	Atlético Madrid	21	29	0.72
2	(Germany) Marc-André ter Stegen	Barcelona	33	36	0.92
3	(Spain) Diego López	Espanyol	37	33	1.12
4	(Spain) Fernando Pacheco	Alavés	42	36	1.17
5	(Spain) Sergio Rico	Sevilla	45	35	1.29

=== Hat-tricks ===
Player	For	Against	Result	Date	Round	Reference
(Uruguay) Luis Suárez	Barcelona	Real Betis	6–2 (H)	20 August 2016	1	
(Belgium) Yannick Carrasco	Atlético Madrid	Granada	7–1 (H)	15 October 2016	8	
(Portugal) Cristiano Ronaldo	Real Madrid	Alavés	4–1 (A)	29 October 2016	10	
(Portugal) Cristiano Ronaldo	Real Madrid	Atlético Madrid	3–0 (A)	19 November 2016	12	
(Spain) Vicente Iborra	Sevilla	Celta Vigo	3–0 (A)	11 December 2016	15	
(France) Wissam Ben Yedder	Sevilla	Real Sociedad	4–0 (A)	7 January 2017	17	
(France) Kevin Gameiro	Atlético Madrid	Sporting Gijón	4–1 (A)	18 February 2017	23	
(Italy) Giuseppe Rossi	Celta Vigo	Las Palmas	3–1 (H)	3 April 2017	29	
(Spain) Álvaro Morata	Real Madrid	Leganés	4–2 (A)	5 April 2017	30	
(Brazil) Neymar	Barcelona	Las Palmas	4–1 (A)	14 May 2017	37	

(H) – Home; (A) – Away

=== Discipline ===
- Most yellow cards (club): 121
  - Alavés
- Fewest yellow cards (club): 74
  - Real Madrid
- Most yellow cards (player): 17
  - Fernando Amorebieta (Sporting Gijón)
- Most red cards (club): 8
  - Celta Vigo
- Fewest red cards (club): 1
  - Barcelona
- Most red cards (player): 2
  - Uche Agbo (Granada)
  - Kevin-Prince Boateng (Las Palmas)
  - Zouhair Feddal (Alavés)
  - Sergi Gómez (Celta Vigo)
  - Cristiano Piccini (Real Betis)
  - Asier Riesgo (Eibar)
  - Víctor Ruiz (Villarreal)

=== Overall ===
- Most wins – Real Madrid (29)
- Fewest wins – Osasuna and Granada (4)
- Most draws – Alavés (13)
- Fewest draws – Real Madrid, Barcelona, Athletic Bilbao and Celta Vigo (6)
- Most losses – Granada (26)
- Fewest losses – Real Madrid (3)
- Most goals scored – Barcelona (116)
- Fewest goals scored – Granada (30)
- Most goals conceded – Osasuna (94)
- Fewest goals conceded – Atlético Madrid (27)

== Average attendances ==
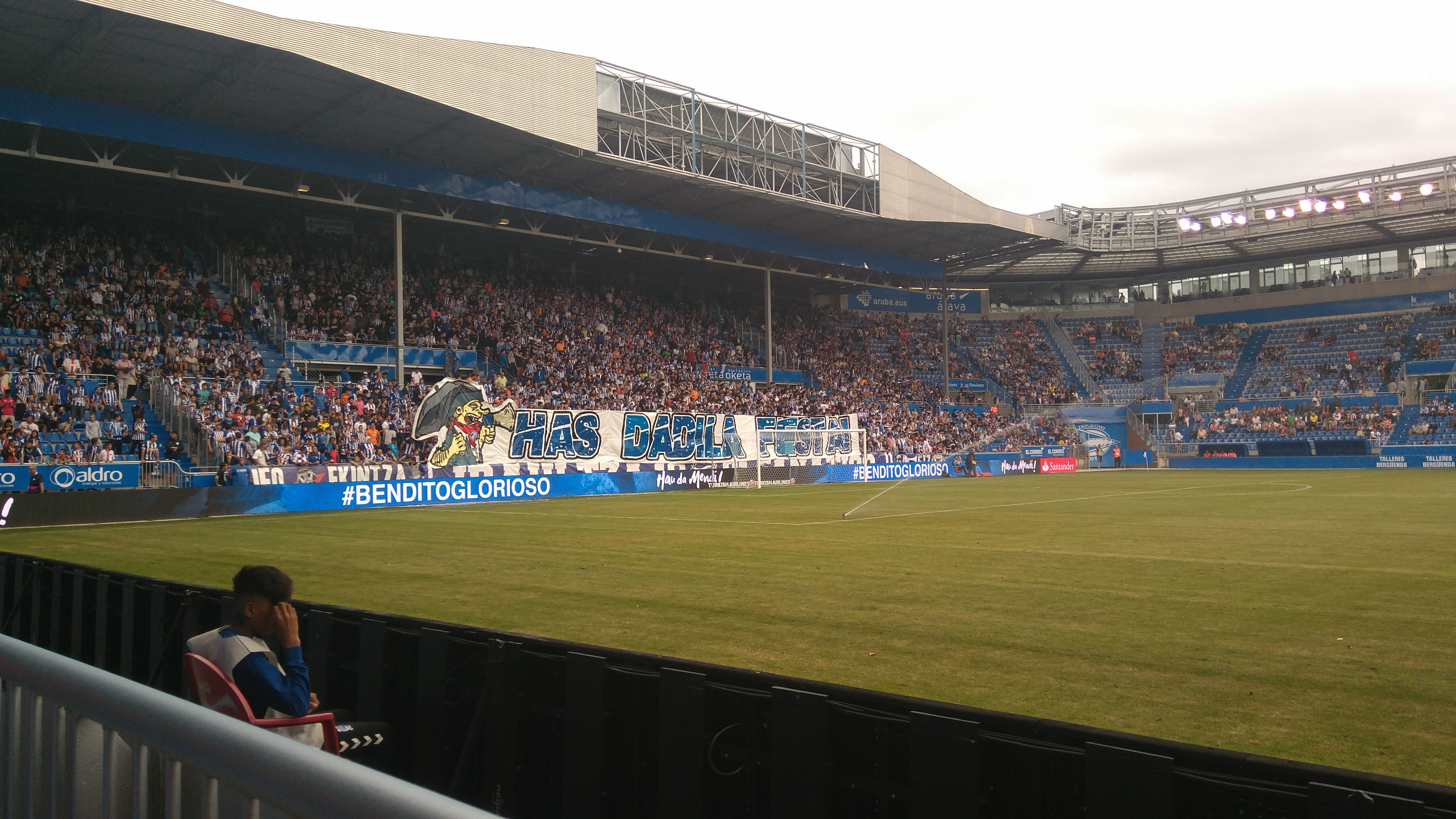
Alavés supporters before their first league match at home, against Sporting Gijón

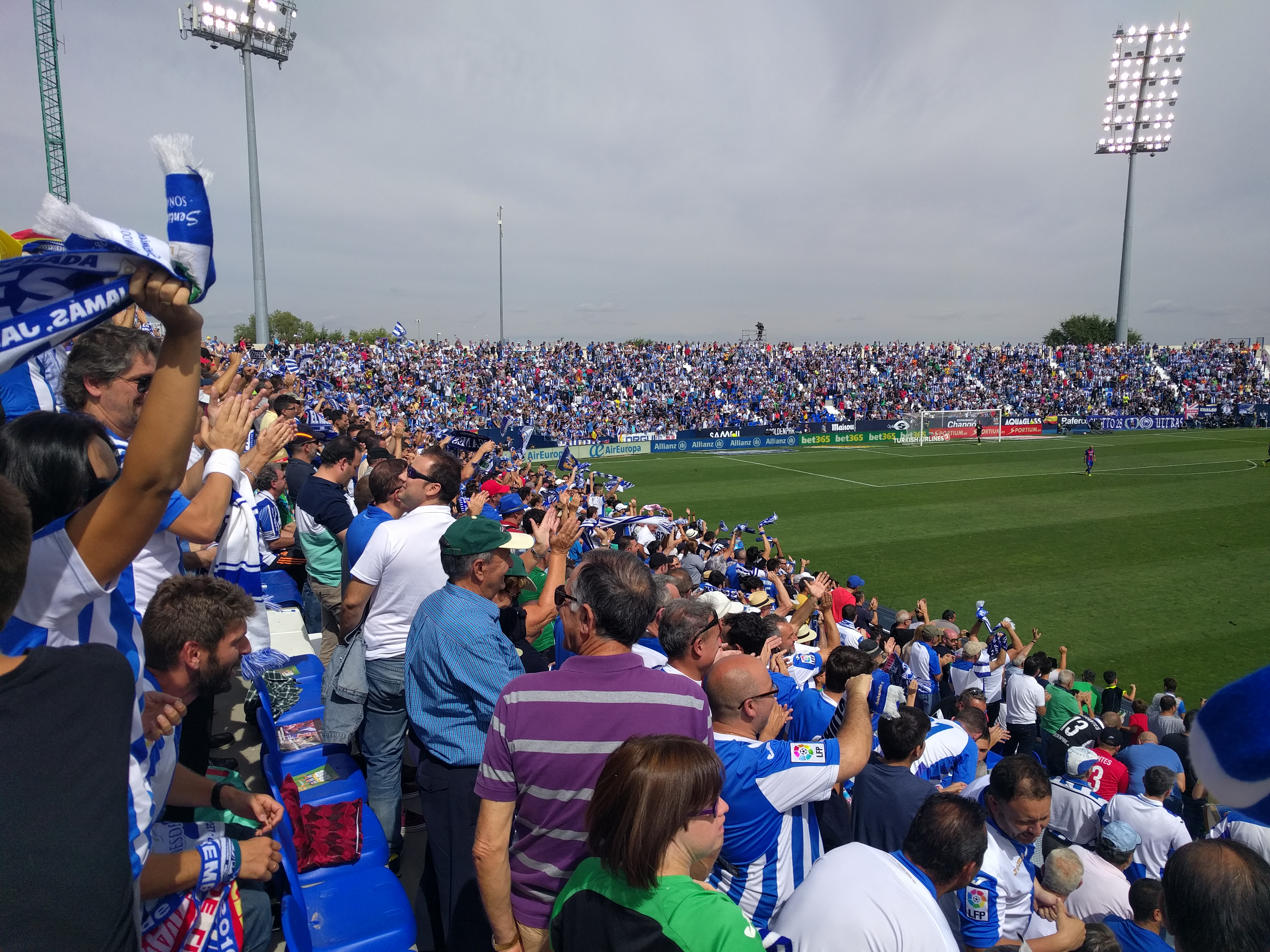
Leganés supporters celebrating their team's goal against Barcelona.

Pos	Team	Total	High	Low	Average	Change
1	Barcelona	1,463,653	95,961	55,029	77,034	−1.6%
2	Real Madrid	1,292,537	82,297	59,575	68,028	+0.5%
3	Atlético Madrid	848,754	53,668	31,059	44,671	+3.4%
4	Athletic Bilbao	781,285	49,164	33,625	41,120	−2.0%
5	Valencia	645,032	46,804	23,156	33,949	−9.1%
6	Sevilla	623,953	40,835	26,100	32,840	−3.4%
7	Real Betis	623,333	41,714	22,270	32,807	−9.2%
8	Sporting Gijón	428,313	25,899	15,365	22,543	−2.8%
9	Deportivo La Coruña	425,077	30,810	18,466	22,372	−2.8%
10	Málaga	420,630	28,486	12,996	22,138	+4.8%
11	Real Sociedad	406,832	27,653	10,927	21,412	+5.3%
12	Las Palmas	387,416	27,724	15,946	20,390	−3.8%
13	Espanyol	381,428	31,082	14,813	20,075	+9.5%
14	Villarreal	329,951	22,110	14,757	17,366	+3.6%
15	Celta Vigo	312,773	20,034	11,391	16,462	−8.6%
16	Alavés	288,310	19,540	12,628	15,174	+34.1%^{1}
17	Granada	284,890	19,161	10,706	14,994	−5.5%
18	Osasuna	281,445	17,802	11,332	14,813	+7.2%^{1}
19	Leganés	177,029	10,599	7,903	9,317	+81.6%^{1}
20	Eibar	100,922	6,694	3,576	5,312	+2.1%
	League total	10,503,563	95,961	3,576	27,641	−0.2%

Source: La Liga boxscores
Notes:
1: Team played last season in Segunda División.

== Awards ==
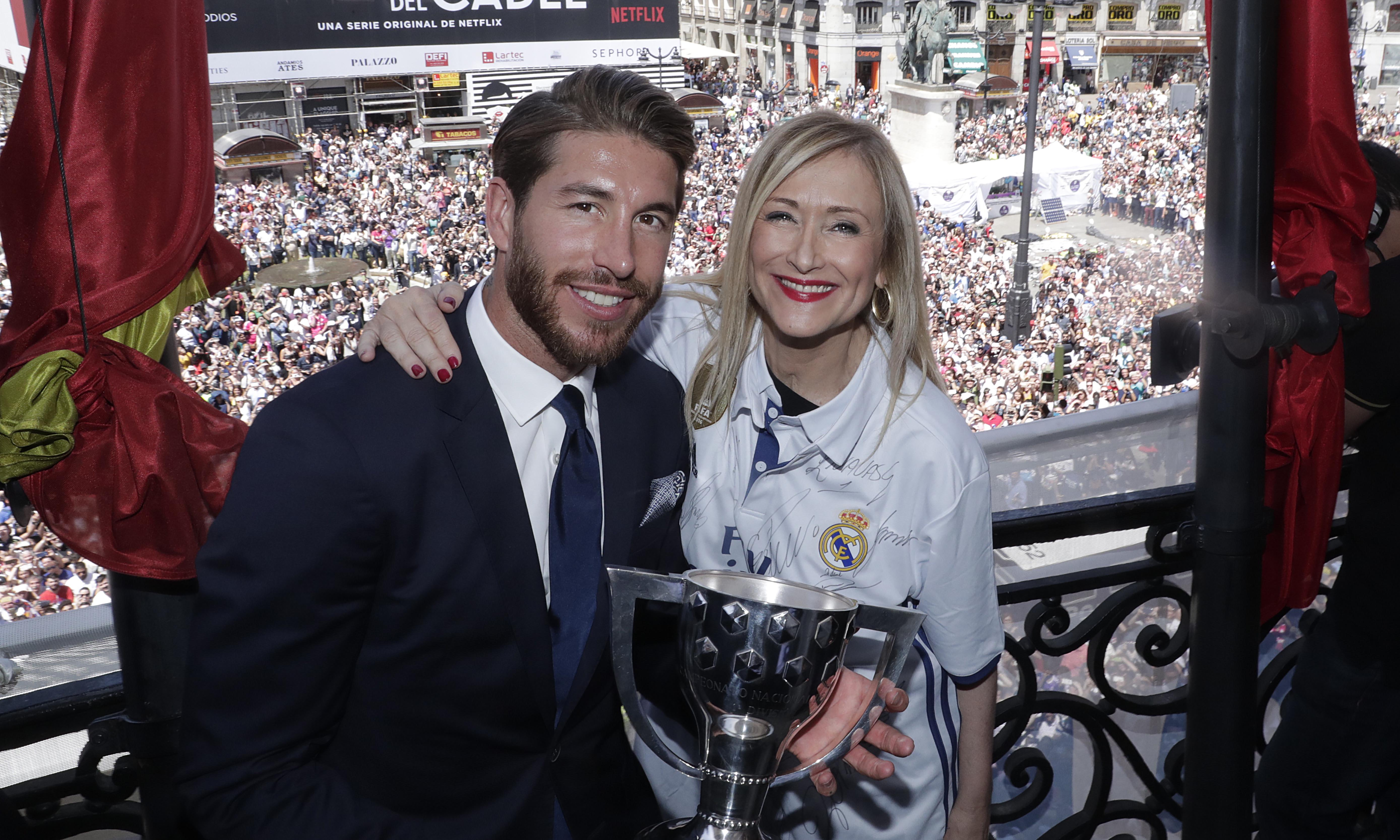
Real Madrid captain Sergio Ramos and Community of Madrid President Cristina Cifuentes with the Primera División trophy during celebrations in Madrid.

=== Seasonal ===
La Liga's governing body, the Liga de Fútbol Profesional, honoured the competition's best players and coach with the La Liga Awards.

	Recipient
Best Player	(Argentina) Lionel Messi (Barcelona)
Best Goalkeeper	(Slovenia) Jan Oblak (Atlético Madrid)
Best Coach	(Spain) José Luis Mendilibar (Eibar) and (Spain) Asier Garitano (Leganés)

==== Team of the Year ====

Team of the Year
Goalkeeper	(Slovenia) Jan Oblak (Atlético Madrid)			
Defenders	(Spain) Dani Carvajal (Real Madrid)	(Spain) Sergio Ramos (Real Madrid)	(Spain) Gerard Piqué (Barcelona)	(Brazil) Filipe Luís (Atlético Madrid)
Midfielders	(Germany) Toni Kroos (Real Madrid)		(Spain) Manu Trigueros (Villarreal)	(Argentina) Pablo Piatti (Espanyol)
Forwards	(Argentina) Lionel Messi (Barcelona)		(Uruguay) Luis Suárez (Barcelona)	(Portugal) Cristiano Ronaldo (Real Madrid)

=== Monthly ===
Month	Manager of the Month		Player of the Month		Reference
Month	Manager	Club	Player	Club	Reference
August	(Spain) Quique Setién	Las Palmas	(Spain) Jon Ander Serantes	Leganés	
September	(Spain) Ernesto Valverde	Athletic Bilbao	(France) Antoine Griezmann	Atlético Madrid	
October	(Argentina) Jorge Sampaoli	Sevilla	(Spain) Iago Aspas	Celta Vigo	
November	(Spain) Eusebio Sacristán	Real Sociedad	(Spain) Diego López	Espanyol	
December	(Spain) Fran Escribá	Villarreal	(Romania) Florin Andone	Deportivo La Coruña	
January	(Argentina) Eduardo Berizzo	Celta Vigo	(France) Steven Nzonzi	Sevilla	
February	(Spain) José Luis Mendilibar	Eibar	(Spain) Sergi Enrich	Eibar	
March	(Argentina) Diego Simeone	Atlético Madrid	(France) Antoine Griezmann	Atlético Madrid	
April	(Spain) Míchel	Málaga	(Argentina) Lionel Messi	Barcelona	
May	(France) Zinedine Zidane	Real Madrid	(Portugal) Cristiano Ronaldo	Real Madrid	
