= Urko Vera =

Spanish footballer (born 1987)

Personal information
- Full name: Urko Vera Mateos
- Date of birth: 14 May 1987 (age 39)
- Place of birth: Barakaldo, Spain
- Height: 1.89 m (6 ft 2 in)
- Position: Centre-forward

Youth career
- 1996–1997: Santutxu
- 1997–1999: Athletic Bilbao
- 2001–2003: Lezama
- 2003–2006: Santutxu

Senior career*
| Years | Team | Apps | (Gls) |
| 2006–2007 | Santutxu | 16 | (8) |
| 2007–2008 | Laudio | ? | (10) |
| 2008–2009 | Portugalete | ? | (6) |
| 2009–2010 | Eibar B | ? | (14) |
| 2010 | Eibar | 3 | (0) |
| 2010–2011 | Lemona | 18 | (13) |
| 2011 | Bilbao Athletic | 7 | (1) |
| 2011 | Athletic Bilbao | 5 | (1) |
| 2011–2012 | Hércules | 31 | (11) |
| 2012–2013 | Ponferradina | 14 | (2) |
| 2013 | Alcorcón | 7 | (1) |
| 2013–2014 | Eibar | 31 | (5) |
| 2014–2015 | Mirandés | 38 | (17) |
| 2015 | Jeonbuk Hyundai | 6 | (0) |
| 2016 | Osasuna | 19 | (3) |
| 2016–2017 | Huesca | 14 | (1) |
| 2017 | Mirandés | 16 | (5) |
| 2017–2019 | CFR Cluj | 17 | (5) |
| 2018 | → Astra Giurgiu (loan) | 10 | (1) |
| 2019–2020 | Oldham Athletic | 10 | (2) |
| 2020 | Guijuelo | 4 | (0) |
| 2020–2021 | Portugalete | 7 | (0) |
| 2021–2025 | Santutxu | 40+ | (12+) |
| Total | | 313+ | (118+) |
- * Club domestic league appearances and goals

Urko Vera Mateos (Spanish pronunciation: [ˈuɾko ˈβeɾa]; (Note: In isolation, Vera is pronounced [ˈbeɾa].) born 14 May 1987) is a Spanish former professional footballer who played as a centre-forward.

== Club career ==
Born in Barakaldo, Biscay, Vera played mostly amateur football until the age of 23, having represented Basque giants Athletic Bilbao as a youth from ages 10 to 12. During his spell at SD Lemona, he earned part of his wage by taking the team's kits to the laundry.

In the last minutes of the 2011 January transfer window, after impressing with Lemona in Segunda División B (the club was coached by legendary Athletic player Aitor Larrazábal), Vera transferred to Athletic on a one-and-a-half-year contract and was assigned to the reserve side, Bilbao Athletic. He made his first-team – and La Liga – debut on 5 February, coming on as a substitute for Iker Muniain for the final 15 minutes of a 3–0 home win against Sporting de Gijón.

On 14 March 2011, again from the bench, Vera scored his only goal for the club and in the top flight, heading home in injury time in a 2–2 draw at Getafe CF. After being released, he resumed his career in the Segunda División, appearing for five sides in four years, including CD Mirandés for whom he netted 20 times in all competitions.

Vera signed with Jeonbuk Hyundai Motors FC in the K League 1 in late July 2015. On 10 January 2016, he returned to his country and joined CA Osasuna in the second division.

On 19 August 2016, Vera agreed to a one-year deal at SD Huesca, still in the second tier. He left by mutual consent and, the following January, returned to Mirandés.

On 18 May 2017, Vera moved to Romania with CFR Cluj. In January 2019, following a short loan spell at FC Astra Giurgiu also in the country's Liga I, he signed with English League Two club Oldham Athletic. His contract at the latter was mutually terminated on 24 January 2020, and he returned to the Spanish lower leagues shortly after with CD Guijuelo.

Vera returned to his native region on 28 August 2020, with the 33-year-old agreeing to a deal at third-tier Club Portugalete. He retired in June 2025, his last employers being his first, Santutxu FC.

== Honours ==
Eibar

- Segunda División: 2013–14

Jeonbuk Hyundai

- K League 1: 2015

CFR Cluj

- Liga I: 2017–18, 2018–19
