= Tano Bonnín =

Dominican Republic footballer

Personal information
- Full name: Cayetano Bartolomé Bonnín Vásquez
- Date of birth: 30 June 1990 (age 36)
- Place of birth: Palma, Spain
- Height: 1.86 m (6 ft 1 in)
- Position: Centre-back

Team information
- Current team: Barletta 1922

Youth career
- 1996–2001: Mallorca
- 2001–2003: San Francisco
- 2003–2009: Mallorca

Senior career*
Years	Team	Apps	(Gls)
2009–2010	Mallorca B	1	(0)
2010	→ Jaén (loan)	8	(2)
2010–2011	Real Madrid C	27	(0)
2011–2013	Valencia B	58	(0)
2013	Noja	0	(0)
2013–2014	Villarreal C	20	(1)
2014–2015	Villarreal B	31	(1)
2015–2018	Osasuna	40	(0)
2018–2019	Lleida Esportiu	27	(0)
2019	Almería	0	(0)
2019–2020	Rapid București	13	(0)
2020–2022	Hércules	46	(0)
2022–2023	Vibonese	32	(1)
2023–2024	Linares	4	(0)
2024	Brindisi	13	(1)
2024–2025	Fidelis Andria	27	(1)
2025–	Barletta 1922	14	(1)

International career
2013–2022	Dominican Republic	20	(1)
- * Club domestic league appearances and goals as of 23:24, 2 April 2026 (UTC)

Cayetano "Tano" Bartolomé Bonnín Vásquez (born 30 June 1990) is a professional footballer who plays as a central defender for Serie D club SSD Barletta 1922.

Born in Spain, he represented the Dominican Republic national team.

== Club career ==
Born in Palma de Mallorca, Balearic Islands, Bonnín all but spent his formative years with local RCD Mallorca, his two spells with the club totalling 11 years. He made his senior debut with the reserves in the Segunda División B, finishing the 2009–10 season on loan to Real Jaén in the same league.

Bonnín signed with Real Madrid in the summer of 2010, being initially assigned to the B team but only representing the third side in the Tercera División. He continued competing in the Spanish lower leagues subsequently, with Valencia CF Mestalla.

In February 2013, Bonnín became an internet sensation after clearing the ball with a bicycle kick against CE L'Hospitalet in a third-division match. On 3 September he joined SD Noja, but moved to Villarreal CF C on 25 October after not being allowed to play.

On 8 July 2015, Bonnín joined CA Osasuna of Segunda División. He made his debut for the club on 30 August, coming on as a 46th-minute substitute for Miguel Flaño in a 1–0 home win against CD Mirandés, and contributed 30 appearances – play-offs included – to help his team to achieve promotion.

Bonnín first appeared in La Liga on 10 September 2016, starting and being sent off in a 5–2 loss at his former employers Real Madrid. On 11 January 2017, in the first minutes of the return match against the same opponents, he broke the fibula and tibia to his right leg after an unlucky challenge by Isco; he made his comeback on 10 December that year, as a late replacement in a 1–0 defeat away to Real Oviedo.

In August 2018, at the end of his contract with Osasuna, Bonnín signed for Lleida Esportiu for the upcoming third-tier campaign. On 11 June of the following year, he moved to UD Almería one league above after agreeing to a two-year deal. He was one of several new signings discarded by incoming manager Pedro Emanuel on 30 August, and resumed his career one month later on a link of equal duration at FC Rapid București in Romania's Liga II.

Bonnín returned to Spain in September 2020, joining Hércules CF on a one-year contract. He was released when a one-year option that had been included was not taken for financial reasons, but later agreed to an identical deal with the Segunda División RFEF club.

Until his retirement, with the exception of a brief stint in the Primera Federación with Linares Deportivo, Bonnín played in the Italian lower leagues.

== International career ==
Born to a Dominican mother, Bonnín made his debut for the Dominican Republic national team on 24 March 2013, appearing in a 3–1 friendly win over Haiti. On 22 March 2018, in his first international match since his leg injury, he captained the nation in a 4–0 friendly victory against the Turks and Caicos Islands in Santo Domingo.

Bonnín scored his only goal for his adopted nation on 12 October 2018, opening a 3–0 defeat of the Cayman Islands in CONCACAF Nations League qualifying.

=== International goals ===
Scores and results list Dominican Republic's goal tally first, score column indicates score after each Bonnín goal.

No.	Date	Venue	Opponent	Score	Result	Competition
1.	12 October 2018	Estadio Cibao, Santiago de los Caballeros, Dominican Republic	Cayman Islands	1–0	3–0	2019–20 CONCACAF Nations League qualification
