= Miguel Olavide =

Spanish footballer (born 1996)

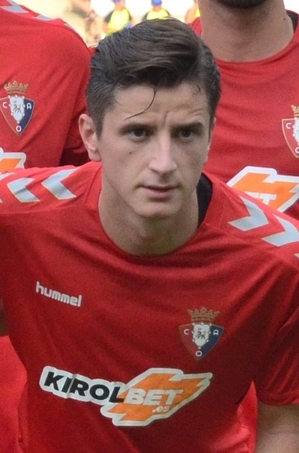
- Olavide with Osasuna in 2018

Personal information
- Full name: Miguel Olavide Montes
- Date of birth: 5 March 1996 (age 30)
- Place of birth: Pamplona, Spain
- Height: 1.78 m (5 ft 10 in)
- Position: Midfielder

Youth career
- Osasuna

Senior career*
Years	Team	Apps	(Gls)
2013–2015	Osasuna B	46	(3)
2014–2019	Osasuna	67	(1)
2017–2018	→ Sevilla B (loan)	25	(0)
2020	Hércules	1	(0)
2020–2021	El Ejido	24	(2)
Total		163	(6)
- * Club domestic league appearances and goals

Miguel Olavide Montes (born 5 March 1996) is a Spanish former professional footballer who played as a midfielder.

== Career ==
Born in Pamplona, Navarre, Olavide graduated from Osasuna's youth setup. He made his senior debuts with the reserves in the 2013–14 campaign in the Tercera División.

On 15 November 2014 Olavide made his first-team debut, replacing fellow youth graduate Maikel Mesa in a 0–1 home loss against SD Ponferradina in the Segunda División, being also sent off in the 89th minute. The following 29 August, he renewed his contract until 2019.

Olavide contributed with 30 appearances during the 2015–16 season, as his side achieved promotion to La Liga through the play-offs. He made his debut in the category on 22 September 2016, replacing Álex Berenguer in a 1–2 home loss against RCD Espanyol.

On 7 May 2017, Olavide scored his first professional goal, netting Osasuna's lone strike in a 4–1 defeat against Valencia. Later that year, on 29 August, he renewed his contract with the club until 2019 and was immediately loaned to Sevilla Atlético in the Segunda División for the 2017–18 season, where he made 25 league appearances. He returned to Osasuna in 2018 and featured briefly before departing the club the following year, having been part of two promotions to La Liga during his time in Pamplona.

In 2020, he joined Hércules in the Segunda División B, followed by a stint with El Ejido, where he played until May 2021.

Following his football career, he completed a degree in Business Administration and Management at the University of Navarra, and subsequently worked as a financial advisor for Mapfre.

== Honours ==
Osasuna

- Segunda División: 2018–19
