= Miguel de las Cuevas =

Spanish footballer (born 1986)

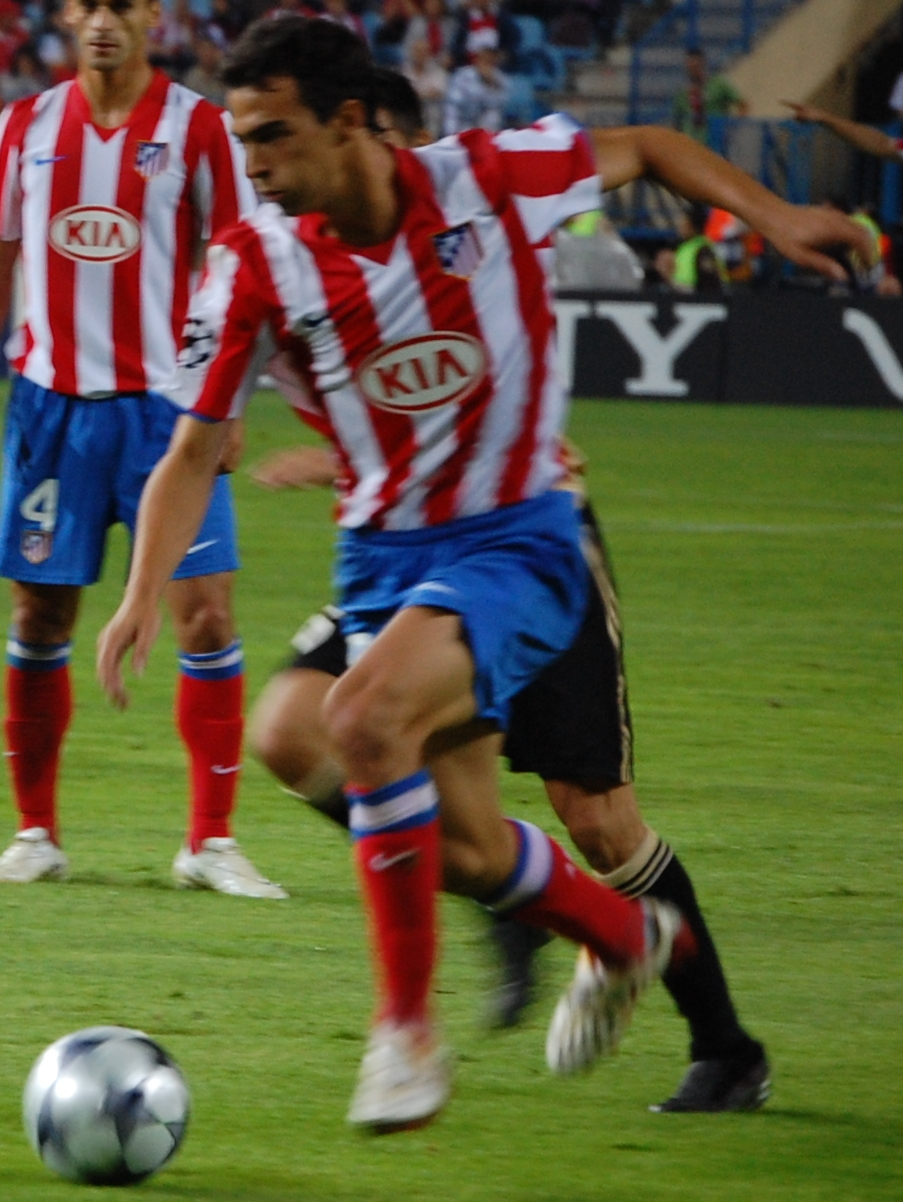
- De las Cuevas with Atlético Madrid in 2008

Personal information
- Full name: Miguel Ángel de las Cuevas Barberá
- Date of birth: 19 June 1986 (age 40)
- Place of birth: Alicante, Spain
- Height: 1.75 m (5 ft 9 in)
- Position: Attacking midfielder

Youth career
- Agustinos
- 1993–2000: Kelme
- 2000–2002: Valencia
- 2002–2003: Hércules

Senior career*
Years	Team	Apps	(Gls)
2003–2004	Hércules B		
2003–2006	Hércules	68	(3)
2006–2009	Atlético Madrid	24	(0)
2009–2013	Sporting Gijón	121	(18)
2013	→ Osasuna (loan)	16	(1)
2013–2015	Osasuna	44	(4)
2015–2016	Spezia	16	(2)
2016–2018	Osasuna	58	(2)
2018–2023	Córdoba	134	(39)
2023–2024	Orihuela	26	(2)
Total		507	(71)

International career
2005	Spain U19	3	(0)
- * Club domestic league appearances and goals

Miguel Ángel de las Cuevas Barberá (born 19 June 1986) is a Spanish former professional footballer. A versatile midfielder, he could play both in the wings and behind the forwards, but usually occupied the attacking midfielder position.

After starting out at Hércules, he went on to appear in 201 La Liga matches over eight seasons, totalling 18 goals for Atlético Madrid, Sporting de Gijón and Osasuna. He added 127 games in the Segunda División (16 goals), and also spent one year in the Italian Serie B with Spezia.

== Club career ==
=== Hércules ===
Born in Alicante, Valencian Community, de las Cuevas started his professional career with hometown club Hércules CF, in the Segunda División B. In the 2004–05 season, he was instrumental as the team achieved promotion to Segunda División after a six-year-absence.

=== Atlético Madrid ===
For the 2006–07 campaign, de las Cuevas signed a five-year contract with Atlético Madrid. During preseason, on 13 August, in the Teresa Herrera Trophy match against Club Nacional de Football, he suffered a serious ankle injury that kept him out of action for more than one year.

De las Cuevas finally made his debut for the Colchoneros on 12 December 2007, playing the second half of a Copa del Rey away tie against Granada 74 CF, in the round of 32. He appeared in 13 La Liga matches in his first season after returning from injury, 12 as a substitute.

=== Sporting Gijón ===
On 25 June 2009, after producing slightly the same numbers with Atlético, de las Cuevas moved to fellow top-tier side Sporting de Gijón on a four-year deal. However, Atlético retained an option to rebuy in the first three. He had a breakthrough season in 2009–10, ranking second in goals in the team at eight; highlights included braces against RCD Mallorca (4–1), Athletic Bilbao (2–1, away) and one against former club Atlético (1–1) that certified Sporting's permanence in the top flight for a further year, on 8 May 2010.

Still under manager Manuel Preciado, de las Cuevas was again an undisputed starter for Gijón in the 2010–11 campaign. On 2 April 2011, he scored the only goal in a win over Real Madrid at the Santiago Bernabéu Stadium, ending José Mourinho's record of nine years and 150 league matches unbeaten at home; he only missed one league game and netted six times, in another final escape from relegation.

=== Osasuna ===
De las Cuevas was loaned to CA Osasuna on 11 January 2013, thus returning to the top flight. The move was made permanent in late May after the Navarrese managed to retain their status, with a €1.2 million fee being paid in equal shares to Atlético and Sporting.

=== Spezia ===
On 29 January 2015, de las Cuevas terminated his contract that ran until June 2016, and moved abroad for the first time in his career at the age of 28, signing with Spezia Calcio in Italy. His first appearance in the Serie B occurred on 14 February, as he featured 73 minutes in a 0–0 draw at Carpi F.C. 1909.

In late September 2015, de las Cuevas successfully underwent surgery to his heart after an anomaly was detected. He was sidelined for six months.

=== Later career ===
De las Cuevas returned to Osasuna on 1 February 2016, on a free transfer. He left the club in July 2018 after his contract expired, and signed a one-year deal with Córdoba CF on 31 August.

De las Cuevas scored nine times in 2018–19, but his team suffered relegation from the second tier. He continued to be first choice the following years, contributing a career-best 13 goals to a promotion to division three in 2022 and being voted the Group IV's best player in the process.
