= Enrique Martín (footballer, born 1956) =

Spanish footballer and manager

Personal information
- Full name: Enrique Martín Monreal Lizarraga
- Date of birth: 9 March 1956 (age 70)
- Place of birth: Pamplona, Spain
- Height: 1.78 m (5 ft 10 in)
- Position: Forward

Youth career
- Osasuna

Senior career*
Years	Team	Apps	(Gls)
1975–1977	Osasuna B		
1977–1988	Osasuna	253	(45)
1977–1978	→ Tudelano (loan)	36	(4)
1978–1979	→ Lleida (loan)	38	(16)
Total		327	(65)

International career
1982	Spain U23	1	(0)
1981	Spain B	1	(0)
1982	Spain	2	(0)

Managerial career
- 1990–1993: Osasuna (youth)
- 1993–1994: Osasuna
- 1994–1997: Osasuna B
- 1997–1999: Osasuna
- 1999–2001: Leganés
- 2001–2002: Burgos
- 2002–2003: Leganés
- 2003–2004: Terrassa
- 2005: Xerez
- 2005: Numancia
- 2006–2008: Osasuna B
- 2012: Osasuna B
- 2015–2016: Osasuna
- 2017–2018: Albacete
- 2018–2019: Gimnàstic
- 2019: Córdoba
- * Club domestic league appearances and goals

Enrique Martín Monreal Lizarraga (born 9 March 1956), known as Martín, is a Spanish football manager and former player who played as a forward.

His professional career was intimately connected with Osasuna, as both a player and coach.

== Playing career ==
Born in Pamplona, Navarre, Martín spent his entire professional career with local CA Osasuna, making his debut in the 1979–80 season whilst the club was in the Segunda División and helping it to return to La Liga after a 17-year absence. He previously represented CD Tudelano and UE Lleida, both on loan.

Subsequently, until his retirement in 1988 at the age of 32, Martín always competed in the top flight, his first game in the competition taking place on 7 September 1980 in a 1–0 home win against UD Las Palmas. His best outputs occurred in that and the 1982–83 campaigns, when he netted seven times from 34 appearances.

In May 1982, Osasuna rejected an offer of 80 million pesetas from Real Madrid. Martín played three matches with his main team in the 1985–86 UEFA Cup, scoring in a 2–0 home victory over Rangers in the first round (2–1 on aggregate); he earned two caps for Spain, his debut coming on 27 October 1982 in a 1–0 defeat of Iceland for the UEFA Euro 1984 qualifiers (six minutes played in Málaga).

== Coaching career ==
Martín worked with Osasuna from 1990 to 1999, being in charge of the youth sides, the reserves and the main squad. In 1993–94, he was one of two coaches as the latter suffered top-flight relegation after finishing last.

After leaving the Rojillos, Martín coached in the second tier with CD Leganés (two spells), Burgos CF, Terrassa FC, Xerez CD and CD Numancia. He led the second club to the 16th position out of 22 teams in the 2001–02 season, but saw it suffer administrative relegation; during one of his spells with Léganes he earned notoriety for racing onto the pitch to tackle a CD Badajoz player, and earned a ten-game ban.

On 5 May 2015, following another two stints with Osasuna B (two full seasons, three games in 2011–12), Martín returned to the first team, seriously threatened with relegation in division two. After managing to narrowly avoid relegation, he achieved promotion to the top flight the following campaign through the play-offs; on 7 November 2016, however, with the side in the relegation zone, he was sacked.

Martín was named manager of Albacete Balompié in the second division on 5 October 2017. The following 4 June, having avoided relegation, he left the club.

On 23 October 2018, Martín replaced José Antonio Gordillo at the helm of Gimnàstic de Tarragona, suffering relegation at the end of the season. On 20 June 2019 he was appointed at Córdoba CF who also dropped down from the second tier, being dismissed after four months in charge.

== Managerial statistics ==
As of 20 October 2019

Managerial record by team and tenure
Team	Nat	From	To	Record								Ref
Team	Nat	From	To	G	W	D	L	GF	GA	GD	Win %	Ref
Osasuna	(Spain)	20 December 1993	1 July 1994	22	4	8	10	19	37	−18	18.18	
Osasuna B	(Spain)	1 July 1994	5 May 1997	120	48	34	38	134	115	+19	40.00	
Osasuna	(Spain)	5 May 1997	30 June 1999	105	40	27	38	105	104	+1	38.10	
Leganés	(Spain)	11 October 1999	30 June 2001	82	27	30	25	84	77	+7	32.93	
Burgos	(Spain)	30 June 2001	25 June 2002	43	12	16	15	31	38	−7	27.91	
Leganés	(Spain)	10 November 2002	30 June 2003	32	10	10	12	37	40	−3	31.25	
Terrassa	(Spain)	21 September 2003	30 June 2004	39	12	13	14	42	44	−2	30.77	
Xerez	(Spain)	17 January 2005	30 June 2005	22	7	10	5	19	20	−1	31.82	
Numancia	(Spain)	1 July 2005	5 December 2005	18	4	6	8	17	29	−12	22.22	
Osasuna B	(Spain)	1 July 2006	18 March 2008	67	18	20	29	49	70	−21	26.87	
Osasuna B	(Spain)	24 April 2012	30 June 2012	3	0	1	2	2	6	−4	0.00	
Osasuna	(Spain)	5 May 2015	7 November 2016	64	24	20	20	77	74	+3	37.50	
Albacete	(Spain)	5 October 2017	4 June 2018	35	10	15	10	31	32	−1	28.57	
Gimnàstic	(Spain)	23 October 2018	10 June 2019	32	8	6	18	24	46	−22	25.00	
Córdoba	(Spain)	20 June 2019	22 October 2019	9	3	4	2	10	10	+0	33.33	
Career Total				693	227	220	246	681	742	−61	32.76	—
