= 2012–13 Real Sociedad season =

Real Sociedad
2012–13 season
- President: Jokin Aperribay
- Head coach: Philippe Montanier
- Stadium: Anoeta
- La Liga: 4th
- Copa del Rey: Round of 32
- Top goalscorer: League: Carlos Vela (14); All: Carlos Vela (14); Imanol Agirretxe (14)
Home colours	Away colours

The 2012–13 season was Real Sociedad's 67th season in La Liga. The club's league campaign surpassed all expectations as 4th spot was achieved and the team qualified for the Champions league play-off round.

== Season summary ==
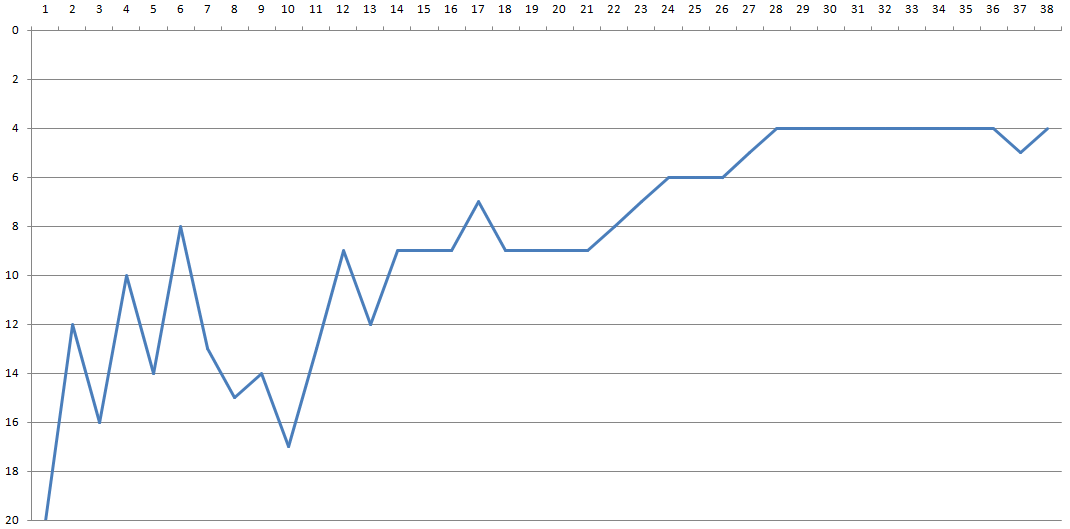
Real Sociedad's progression during the 2012–13 season.

The season began with mixed results. A series of home wins and away defeats were reminiscent of previous season's frustration. A convincing win in the Basque derby was the only exception during this disappointing period. Early in November, the club suffered a Copa del Rey defeat away to Segunda División side Córdoba. This was followed by a league defeat at home against 19th-ranked team Espanyol. With the match still in play, fans at the stadium called for Montanier's resignation.

In the Copa del Rey, the team was incapable of overturning the first leg's deficit and exited the competition.

=== An exceptional run ===
With an away victory to Málaga, Real Sociedad began a run that stretched from mid-November to the end of the season where the team suffered only two defeats. The team found stability with a 4–2–3–1 formation comprising Asier Illarramendi and Markel Bergara in the double 6 and Xabi Prieto just ahead of them as an attacking midfielder.

=== Race for fourth ===
In April, it became clear that either Real Sociedad or Valencia would capture the fourth-place spot. On 28 April, a decisive match between these two took place at Anoeta. Real Sociedad was capable of coming back and won the match, thus opening a five-point gap with Valencia. In the following weeks, however, Valencia won three-straight games while Real Sociedad dropped points. Before the last matchday, Real Sociedad were two points behind Valencia and had to travel to relegation-threatened Deportivo de La Coruña. Real Sociedad won their match and Valencia lost theirs, sending the Basque team to fourth place and securing a spot at the UEFA Champions League play-off round.

Real Sociedad scored 70 goals that season, more than any other club bar Real Madrid and Barcelona and had the fourth-best defence.

Towards the end of the season, when it seemed like Philippe Montanier was about to renew his contract, he signed a contract with Rennes instead. Montanier was awarded the Ramón Cobo trophy, given to the best manager, by the Royal Spanish Football Federation's coaches committee.

=== League table ===
Pos	Team	Pld	W	D	L	GF	GA	GD	Pts	Qualification or relegation
2	Real Madrid	38	26	7	5	103	42	+61	85	Qualification for the Champions League group stage
3	Atlético Madrid	38	23	7	8	65	31	+34	76	Qualification for the Champions League group stage
4	Real Sociedad	38	18	12	8	70	49	+21	66	Qualification for the Champions League play-off round
5	Valencia	38	19	8	11	67	54	+13	65	Qualification for the Europa League group stage (Note: Since the 2012–13 Copa del Rey champions Atlético Madrid and runners-up Real Madrid qualified for the 2013–14 UEFA Champions League, the 5th, 6th and 7th placed teams qualified for the group stage, play-off round, and third qualifying round of the 2013–14 UEFA Europa League respectively.)
6	Málaga	38	16	9	13	53	50	+3	57	(Note: Málaga was excluded from participating in any UEFA club competition in 2013–14 season as a punishment for not complying with UEFA Financial Fair Play Regulations. Málaga appealed against this UEFA ban, but the Court of Arbitration for Sport confirmed the decision of the UEFA Club Financial Control Body.)

Source: La Liga
Rules for classification: 1st points; 2nd head-to-head points; 3rd head-to-head goal difference; 4th goal difference; 5th number of goals scored; 7th Fair-play points

=== Dispute over TV broadcasting rights ===
Early in 2012, Real Sociedad filed lawsuit against Mediapro on the grounds that payments were not in time or were incomplete. This escalated to a legal case that was eventually won by Real Sociedad. The media group was told to pay what had been established in the contract and €7 million as compensation. Real Sociedad was in addition declared free to sign a broadcasting contract with whoever they wanted to. Weeks before the start of the new season Real Sociedad agreed a 3-year deal with Canal +. Mediapro appealed this decision and in May a provincial court declared that the infringement was not serious enough to justify the €7 million compensation. Real Sociedad had to refund this amount.

== Transfers ==
=== Players leaving the club (summer) ===
Player	New Team	Fee
(Spain) Mikel Aranburu	Retired	End of contract
(Spain) Borja Viguera	(Spain) Alavés	End of contract
(Spain) Toño Ramírez	(Spain) Guadalajara	End of contract
(Norway) Vadim Demidov	(Germany) Eintracht Frankfurt	€500,000

==== Loan out ====
Player	Team
(Spain) Joseba Llorente	(Spain) Osasuna
(Netherlands) Jeffrey Sarpong	(Spain) Hércules

==== Loan end ====
Player	To
(Mexico) Carlos Vela	(England) Arsenal

=== Players leaving the club (winter) ===
Player	New Team	Fee
(Netherlands) Jeffrey Sarpong		Contract rescinded

=== Players joining the club (summer) ===
==== Signings ====
Player	From	Fee
(Uruguay) Chory Castro	(Spain) Mallorca	Free agent
(Mexico) Carlos Vela	(England) Arsenal	

==== Loan in ====
Player	From
(Spain) José Ángel	(Italy) Roma

==== Loan return ====
Player	From
(Netherlands) Jeffrey Sarpong	(Netherlands) NAC Breda

== Squad ==
Note: Flags indicate national team as defined under FIFA eligibility rules; some limited exceptions apply. Players may hold more than one non-FIFA nationality.

No.	Pos.	Nation	Player
1	GK	CHI	Claudio Bravo
2	DF	ESP	Carlos Martínez
3	DF	ESP	Mikel González
4	MF	ESP	Gorka Elustondo
5	MF	ESP	Markel Bergara
6	DF	ESP	Iñigo Martínez
7	MF	FRA	Antoine Griezmann
8	MF	ESP	Asier Illarramendi
9	FW	ESP	Imanol Agirretxe
10	MF	ESP	Xabi Prieto
11	FW	MEX	Carlos Vela
13	GK	ESP	Eñaut Zubikarai

No.	Pos.	Nation	Player
14	MF	ESP	Rubén Pardo
15	DF	ESP	Ion Ansotegi
16	MF	NED	Jeffrey Sarpong
17	MF	FRA	David Zurutuza
18	MF	URU	Chory Castro
19	DF	ALG	Liassine Cadamuro-Bentaïba
20	DF	ESP	José Ángel
21	FW	URU	Diego Ifrán
22	DF	ESP	Dani Estrada
23	MF	ESP	Javi Ros
24	DF	ESP	Alberto de la Bella

== Start formations ==
Starting XI

Lineup that started most of the club's competitive matches throughout the season.

No.	Pos.	Nat.	Name	MS	Notes
1	GK	(Chile)	Claudio Bravo	31	Missed 7 games due to injury
2	RB	(Spain)	Carlos Martínez	29	A starter from the 9th round onwards
6	CB	(Spain)	Iñigo Martínez	34	
3	CB	(Spain)	Mikel González	34	
24	LB	(Spain)	Alberto de la Bella	36	
8	MF	(Spain)	Illarramendi	32	
5	MF	(Spain)	Markel	27	Pardo started 10 games
10	AM	(Spain)	Xabi Prieto	33	
11	AM	(Mexico)	Vela	32	
7	AM	(France)	Antoine Griezmann	32	Played as a 10 early in the season
9	FW	(Spain)	Agirretxe	22	Ifrán started 9 games

== Matches ==
=== Legend ===
Win Draw Loss Postponed

=== Pre-season ===
14 July 2012 Friendly	Les Eglatins (France)	0 – 15	(Spain) Real Sociedad	Hendaye
19:00 CET		(Report)	4', 35', 40' Ifrán; 23', 27', 44' Agirretxe; 51', 64', 66', 77' Llorente; 60' C. Martínez; 63', 88' Pardo; 73' Ros; 86' Hernández	Stadium: Stade Bixente Lizarazu

18 July 2012 Friendly	SD Eibar	0 – 3	Real Sociedad	Azpeitia
18:30 CET		(Report)	19' Llorente; 73' Griezmann; 83' Prieto	Stadium: Garmendipe

20 July 2012 Friendly	Lyon (France)	1 – 1	(Spain) Real Sociedad	Saint-Jean-de-Luz
18:00 CET	Briand 77'	(Report)	66' Griezmann	Stadium: Stade municipal St Jean de Luz; Referee: Maxim Thual

28 July 2012 Friendly	Bordeaux (France)	1 – 0	(Spain) Real Sociedad	Irun
19:00 CET	Gouffran 89'	(Report)		Stadium: Stadium Gal

31 July 2012 Friendly	Real Zaragoza	1 – 2	Real Sociedad	Bergara
19:00 CET	González 50'	(Report)	10', 69' Agirretxe	Stadium: Agorrosin

5 August 2012 Friendly	Modena (Italy)	0 – 1	(Spain) Real Sociedad	Modena
21:00 CET		(Report)	83' Ifrán	Stadium: Stadio Alberto Braglia; Referee: Peruzzo

9 August 2012 Friendly	Parma (Italy)	2 – 0	(Spain) Real Sociedad	Parma
20:45 CET	Lucarelli 33'; Morrone 90'	(Report)		Stadium: Stadio Ennio Tardini; Referee: De Marco

10 August 2012 Friendly	Varese (Italy)	2 – 4	(Spain) Real Sociedad	Varese
20:45 CET	Momentè 54', 78' (pen.)	(Report)	6', 28' Griezmann; 34' Agirretxe; 78' Zurutuza	Stadium: Stadio Franco Ossola; Referee: De Marco

11 August 2012 Friendly	Siena (Italy)	1 – 0	(Spain) Real Sociedad	Siena
20:45 CET	Calaiò 54'; Paci (yellow card) 52'	(Report)		Stadium: Stadio Artemio Franchi – Montepaschi Arena; Referee: Daniele Doveri

=== La Liga ===
19 August 2012 1	Barcelona	5 – 1	Real Sociedad	Barcelona
21:00 CET	Puyol 3'; Messi 10', 15'; Mascherano (yellow card) 38'; Pedro 40'; Villa 83', (yellow card) 84'	Report	Castro 8'; Prieto (yellow card) 34'; De la Bella (yellow card) 70'; Ansotegi (yellow card) 82'	Stadium: Camp Nou; Attendance: 57,721; Referee: González González (Castille and León)

25 August 2012 2	Real Sociedad	2 – 1	Celta Vigo	San Sebastián
19:00 CET	Agirretxe 54', 61'; Ansotegi (yellow card) 30'; Illarramendi (yellow card) 38'; Vela (yellow card) 62'; Griezmann (yellow card) 87'; Bergara (yellow card) 87'	Report	De Lucas 49'; Mallo (yellow card) 64'; López (yellow card) 79'	Stadium: Anoeta

1 September 2012 3	Mallorca	1 – 0	Real Sociedad	Palma
22:00 CET	Pereira (yellow card) 28'; López (yellow card) 73'; Víctor 75', (yellow card) 76'; Márquez (yellow card) 80'; Martí (yellow card) 89'	Report	Bergara (yellow card) 30'; Ansotegi (yellow card) 71'	Stadium: Iberostar

16 September 2012 4	Real Sociedad	2 – 0	Real Zaragoza	San Sebastián
19:50 CET	De la Bella (yellow card) 38'; I. Martínez 55'; Bergara (yellow card) 57'; Vela 61' (pen.), (yellow card) 68'; Griezmann (yellow card) 90'	Report	Paredes (yellow card) 37'; Abraham (yellow card) 90+1'	Stadium: Anoeta; Attendance: 20,000; Referee: Ignacio Iglesias

23 September 2012 5	Levante	2 – 1	Real Sociedad	Valencia
16:00 CET	Barkero 70' (pen.); Martins 86'; Juanfran (yellow card) 51'; Navarro (yellow card) 60'	Report	23' Zurutuza; (yellow card) 63' Estrada; (yellow card) 69' I. Martínez; (yellow card) 75' Illarramendi; (yellow card) 90+3' Vela	Stadium: Ciutat de València

30 September 2012 6	Real Sociedad	2 – 0	Athletic Bilbao	San Sebastián
20:00 CET	Illarramendi (yellow card) 48'; Griezmann 62'; Vela 71' (pen.)	Report	Iturraspe (yellow card) 9'; San José (yellow card) 24'; Amorebieta (red card) 2'; Susaeta (yellow card) 71'	Stadium: Anoeta

6 October 2012 7	Real Betis	2 – 0	Real Sociedad	Seville
22:00 CET	Paulão 18'; Castro 81'; Martínez (yellow card) 25'; Beñat (yellow card) 42'; Mario (yellow card) 54' (yellow-red card) 88'; Agra (yellow card) 77'; Pérez (yellow card) 90'	Report	Griezmann (yellow card) 26'; Estrada (yellow card) 80'	Stadium: Estadio Benito Villamarín; Attendance: 30,886; Referee: José Antonio Teixeira Vitienes

21 October 2012 8	Real Sociedad	0 – 1	Atlético Madrid	San Sebastián
21:30 CET	Bergara (yellow card) 23'; De la Bella (yellow card) 33'; I. Martínez (yellow card) 53'; Estrada (yellow card) 81'; Illarramendi (yellow card) 89'	Report	Filipe Luís (yellow card) 67'; Godín (yellow card) 77'; Falcao 90'	Stadium: Anoeta; Attendance: 27,000; Referee: Ayza Gámez (Valencian Community)

29 October 2012 9	Real Valladolid	2 – 2	Real Sociedad	Valladolid
21:30 CET	Rueda (yellow card) 15'; Ebert (yellow card) 39', (goal) 42'; Rubio (yellow card) 63'; Óscar 74'	(Report)	Griezmann 36', 56'; González (yellow card) 72'; C. Martínez (yellow card) 76'; Pardo (yellow card) 90+3'	Stadium: Nuevo José Zorrilla; Attendance: 12,574; Referee: (Catalonia) Álvarez Izquierdo

4 November 2012 10	Real Sociedad	0 – 1	Espanyol	San Sebastián
12:00 CET	González (yellow card) 29'	Report	77' Colotto; (yellow card) 33' Mubarak; (yellow card) 42' Gómez; (yellow card) 75' Longo; (yellow card) 83' Baena; (yellow card) 90+2' Stuani; (yellow card) 90' C. Álvarez	Stadium: Anoeta

11 November 2012 11	Málaga	1 – 2	Real Sociedad	Málaga
22:00 CEST	Saviola 37'	Report	Vela 1'; Prieto 58'	Stadium: La Rosaleda Stadium; Attendance: 27,000; Referee: Alberto Undiano Mallenco (Navarre)

19 November 2012 12	Real Sociedad	4 – 0	Rayo Vallecano	San Sebastián
15:30 CEST	Ifrán (yellow card) 2'; Vela 31', 53'; Mikel 61'; Castro 77'	Report	Tito (yellow card) 7'; Casado (yellow card) 10'; Gálvez (yellow card) 67'	Stadium: Anoeta; Attendance: 22,600

25 November 2012 13	Real Sociedad	0 – 0	Osasuna	San Sebastián
21:30 CEST	González (yellow card) 22'; Illarramendi (yellow card) 27'; De la Bella (yellow card) 37'	Report	Nano (yellow card) 7'; Sola (yellow card) 38'; Arribas (yellow card) 44'; Armenteros (yellow card) 53'	Stadium: Anoeta; Attendance: 20500

1 December 2012 14	Valencia	2 – 5	Real Sociedad	Valencia
18:00 (CET)	Soldado 2', 73'; Ruiz (yellow card) 16'; Jonas (red card) 41'; Banega (yellow card) 77'	Report	C. Martínez (yellow card) 33'; De la Bella 43'; González 56'; Ifrán 64'; Vela (yellow card) 67', (goal) 89' (pen.); Agirretxe 83'	Stadium: Mestalla; Attendance: 35,000; Referee: (Aragon) Clos Gómez

9 December 2012 15	Real Sociedad	1 – 1	Getafe	San Sebastián
16:00 (CET)	Pardo (yellow card) 61'; González (yellow card) 63'; C. Martínez 90+1'	Report	Lopo (yellow card) 29'; Barrada (yellow card) 46'; Mané (yellow card) 59'; Alexis (yellow card) 65'; Míchel (yellow card) 77'; Lafita 86'; Gavilán (yellow card) 90+3'	Stadium: Anoeta; Attendance: 23,000

16 December 2012 16	Granada	0 – 0	Real Sociedad	Granada
20:00 (CET)	Nyom (yellow card) 29'; Ighalo (yellow card) 78'; Romero (yellow card) 87'	Report	C. Martínez (yellow card) 44'; Prieto (yellow card) 61'; Vela (yellow card) 90'	Stadium: Los Cármenes

20 December 2012 17	Real Sociedad	2 – 1	Sevilla	San Sebastián
22:00 CET	Vela 18'; I. Martínez (yellow card) 37'; De la Bella 69'; Illarramendi (yellow card) 82'	Report	Spahić (yellow card) 23'; Medel 49'; Coke (yellow card) 71' (yellow-red card) 74'; Botía (yellow card) 76'; Navarro (yellow card) 80'	Stadium: Anoeta; Attendance: 22,000; Referee: (Catalonia) Álvarez Izquierdo

6 January 2013 18	Real Madrid	4 – 3	Real Sociedad	Madrid
17:00 CET (UTC+01:00)	Benzema 2'; Adán (red card) 6'; Khedira 35'; Ronaldo (yellow card) 44', (goal) 68', 70'; Alonso (yellow card) 70'	Report	Prieto 9' (pen.), 40', 76'; González (yellow card) 15'; Estrada (yellow card) 26' (yellow-red card) 79'; I. Martínez (yellow card) 41'; Zurutuza (yellow card) 51'; José Ángel (yellow card) 90+1'; Elustondo (yellow card) 90+2'	Stadium: Santiago Bernabéu; Attendance: 75,000; Referee: Ignacio Iglesias Villanueva (Galicia)

13 January 2013 19	Real Sociedad	1 – 1	Deportivo La Coruña	San Sebastián
17:00 CET (UTC+01:00)	Vela 45'; Illarramendi (yellow card) 54'; Ansotegi (yellow card) 67'; Castro (yellow card) 85'	Report	Pizzi 27'; Evaldo (red card) 2'; Manuel Pablo (yellow card) 55'; Assunção (yellow card) 69'; Castro (yellow card) 71'	Stadium: Anoeta; Attendance: 22,500

19 January 2013 20	Real Sociedad	3 – 2	Barcelona	San Sebastián
18:00 CET (UTC+01:00)	I. Martínez (yellow card) 36'; Castro 41', 63'; Illarramendi (yellow card) 79'; Agirretxe 90+1'; Griezmann (yellow card) 90+3'	Report	Messi 7'; Pedro 25'; Piqué (yellow card) 33' (yellow-red card) 56'; Iniesta (yellow card) 58'; Busquets (yellow card) 74'	Stadium: Anoeta; Referee: Undiano Mallenco (Navarre)

26 January 2013 21	Celta Vigo	1 – 1	Real Sociedad	Vigo
17:00 CET (UTC+01:00)	Krohn-Dehli (yellow card) 18', (goal) 32'; Cabral (yellow card) 30'; Fernández (yellow card) 42' (yellow-red card) 50'; Lago (yellow card) 76'; Park (yellow card) 86'	Report	Elustondo (yellow card) 20', (goal) 59'; De la Bella (yellow card) 65'; Bergara (yellow card) 84'	Stadium: Balaídos

3 February 2013 22	Real Sociedad	3 – 0	Mallorca	San Sebastián
21:00 CET (UTC+01:00)	Castro 55'; Vela 70'; José Ángel (yellow card) 39'; Ifrán 88' (yellow card) 89'	Report	Hemed (yellow card) 6'; Márquez (yellow card) 25' (yellow-red card) 29'; López (yellow card) 89'	Stadium: Anoeta; Attendance: 19,000

10 February 2013 23	Real Zaragoza	1 – 2	Real Sociedad	Zaragoza
17:00 CET (UTC+01:00)	Héctor (yellow card) 13' (yellow-red card) 22'; Álvaro (yellow card) 25'; Săpunaru (yellow card) 31'; Postiga (yellow card) 68'; Apoño 90+2' (pen.)	Report	Griezmann 11'; Agirretxe 32'	Stadium: La Romareda

17 February 2013 24	Real Sociedad	1 – 1	Levante	San Sebastián
12:00 CET (UTC+01:00)	Vela 18' (pen.); Pardo (yellow card) 86'; Castro (yellow card) 90+3'	Report	Karabelas (yellow card) 18' (yellow-red card) 57'; Míchel (yellow card) 37', (goal) 57' (pen.); Iborra (yellow card) 45'; Valdo (yellow card) 86'; Diop (yellow card) 90+3'	Stadium: Anoeta

24 February 2013 25	Athletic Bilbao	1 – 3	Real Sociedad	Bilbao
21:30 CET (UTC+01:00)	Ibai 30'; Laporte (yellow card) 38'; Iturraspe (yellow card) 45'; Muniain (yellow card) 84'	Report	34' Griezmann; Illarramendi (yellow card) 49'; 66' Agirretxe; 76' Vela	Stadium: San Mamés

3 March 2013 26	Real Sociedad	3 – 3	Real Betis	San Sebastián
21:00 CET (UTC+01:00)	C. Martínez (yellow card) 36'; Vela 51'; I. Martínez 56'; Prieto 62' (pen.)	Report	29' Molina; Beñat (yellow card) 42'; Pabón 49', 66' Ángel (yellow card) 61'; Cañas (yellow card) 72'; Chica (yellow card) 90+1'	Stadium: Anoeta

10 March 2013 27	Atlético Madrid	0 – 1	Real Sociedad	Madrid
21:00 CET (UTC+01:00)	Turan (yellow card) 38'; Juanfran (yellow card) 47'; Godín (yellow card) 59'; Costa (yellow card) 86'; Falcao (yellow card) 90'	Summary	Vela (yellow card) 11'; Mikel (yellow card) 16'; Prieto 53'	Stadium: Vicente Calderón; Attendance: 40,000; Referee: Miguel Ayza Gámez

17 March 2013 28	Real Sociedad	4 – 1	Real Valladolid	San Sebastián
16:00 CET (UTC+01:00)	Griezmann 33', 44'; Agirretxe 39'; Prieto 48'	Report	Balenziaga (yellow card) 33'; Guerra 87'	Stadium: Anoeta

31 March 2013 29	Espanyol	2 – 2	Real Sociedad	Cornellà de Llobregat
19:00 CET (UTC+01:00)	García 9'; Stuani 39'; Forlín (yellow card) 25'; Sánchez (yellow card) 68'	Report	24' Zurutuza; 76' (o.g.) López; (yellow card) 51' I. Martínez; (yellow card) 75' Agirretxe; (yellow card) 78' González; (yellow card) 88' De la Bella	Stadium: Cornellà-El Prat; Attendance: 22,323; Referee: Pedro Pérez Montero; Assistant referees: José Matías; Jorge Canelo; Fourth official: Alexandre Alemán

6 April 2013 30	Real Sociedad	4 – 2	Málaga	San Sebastián
16:00 CET (UTC+01:00)	Vela 21'; De la Bella 24', (yellow card) 56'; Griezmann 30'; I. Martínez 51'; Pardo (yellow card) 59'	Report	40' Morales; 70' Santa Cruz; (yellow card) 47' Camacho; (yellow card) 47' Fernández	Stadium: Anoeta

14 April 2013 31	Rayo Vallecano	0 – 2	Real Sociedad	Vallecas
12:00 CET (UTC+01:00)	Figueras (yellow card) 30'; Piti (yellow card) 45'; Gálvez (yellow card) 55'; Domínguez (yellow card) 60'; Fuego (yellow card) 71'	Report	6', 14' Agirretxe; (yellow card) 9' Vela; (yellow card) 74' Illarramendi; (yellow card) 88' Castro	Stadium: Campo de Vallecas

21 April 2013 32	Osasuna	0 – 0	Real Sociedad	Pamplona
19:00 CET (UTC+01:00)	Armenteros (yellow card) 11'; Nano (yellow card) 23'; Arribas (yellow card) 47'; Oier (yellow card) 84'	Report	(yellow card) 10' González; (yellow card) 18' Griezmann; (yellow card) 28' Cadamuro; (yellow card) 44' Vela	Stadium: El Sadar; Referee: Antonio Mateu Lahoz

28 April 2013 33	Real Sociedad	4 – 2	Valencia	San Sebastián
21:00 CET (UTC+01:00)	I. Martínez (yellow card) 20', (goal) 34'; Castro 73'; Agirretxe 86', 90'; Bergara (yellow card) 72'; Illarramendi (yellow card) 82'	Report	25' Soldado; 90' Jonas; (yellow card) 14' Cissokho; (yellow card) 37' Mathieu; (yellow card) 47' Banega; (yellow card) 66' Albelda	Stadium: Anoeta

5 May 2013 34	Getafe	2 – 1	Real Sociedad	Getafe
22:00 CET (UTC+01:00)	Pedro León 18'; Barrada 39', (yellow card) 51'; Castro (yellow card) 37'; Fernández (yellow card) 60'	Report	4' Vela; (yellow card) 56' Griezmann; (yellow card) 90' I. Martínez	Stadium: Alfonso Pérez; Referee: Alberto Undiano Mallenco

12 May 2013 35	Real Sociedad	2 – 2	Granada	San Sebastián
22:00 CET (UTC+01:00)	Castro 9'; Agirretxe 45'; González (yellow card) 90+1'; Griezmann (yellow card) 90+3'	Report	(yellow card) 14', (goal) 15' El-Arabi; (yellow card) 19' Siqueira; (yellow card) 70' Nolito; (yellow card) 82' Buonanotte; (yellow card) 89' Toño; Recio 90+3'	Stadium: Anoeta; Attendance: 22,000; Referee: Javier Estrada Fernández

19 May 2013 36	Sevilla	1 – 2	Real Sociedad	Seville
22:00 CET (UTC+01:00)	Rakitić 10'; Kondogbia (yellow card) 15'; Navarro (yellow card) 41'; Reyes (red card) 58'; Moreno (yellow card) 63'; Diawara (yellow card) 90+1'	Report	16' (o.g.) Rakitić; 24', (yellow card) 55' Agirretxe; (yellow card) 19' Vela; (yellow card) 78' Cadamuro	Stadium: Ramón Sánchez Pizjuán

26 May 2013 37	Real Sociedad	3 – 3	Real Madrid	San Sebastián
20:00 CET (UTC+01:00)	Prieto 64' (pen.), 90+3'; Griezmann 78'; Bergara (yellow card) 25'	Report	6' Higuaín; 57' Callejón; 80', (yellow card) 63' Khedira; (yellow card) 45' Essien	Stadium: Anoeta; Attendance: 30,586; Referee: González González

1 June 2013 38	Deportivo La Coruña	0 – 1	Real Sociedad	A Coruña
21:00 CEST	Sílvio (yellow card) 38'; Aythami (yellow card) 41'; J. Domínguez (yellow card) 67'; Aranzubia (yellow card) 82'; Aguilar (yellow card) 85'; Oliveira (yellow card) 89'; Riki (yellow card) 90'	Report	22', (yellow card) 89' Griezmann; (yellow card) 30' (yellow-red card) 84' Bergara; (yellow card) 82' Zurutuza	Stadium: Riazor; Attendance: 29,000; Referee: David Fernández Borbalán

=== Copa del Rey ===
1 November 2012	Córdoba	2 – 0	Real Sociedad	Córdoba
19:00 CET	Patiño 42'; Rennella 77' (pen.)	Report		Stadium: Nuevo Arcángel; Attendance: 15,790; Referee: José Luis González González

27 November 2012	Real Sociedad	2 – 2 (2 – 4 agg.)	Córdoba	San Sebastián
19:30 CET	Griezmann 21'; Agirretxe 85'	Report	Patiño 65'; Dubarbier 72'	Stadium: Anoeta; Attendance: 16,918; Referee: Miguel Ángel Ayza Gámez
