= 2013–14 Real Sociedad season =

Real Sociedad
2013–14 season
- President: Jokin Aperribay
- Head coach: Jagoba Arrasate
- Stadium: Anoeta
- La Liga: 7th
- Copa del Rey: Semi-finals
- UEFA Champions League: Group stage (4th)
- Top goalscorer: League: Antoine Griezmann (16); Carlos Vela (16); All: Antoine Griezmann (19); Carlos Vela (19)
Home colours	Away colours	Third colours

The 2013–14 season was Real Sociedad's 67th season in La Liga. Real Sociedad finished 7th in the league and reached the semifinals of the Copa del Rey. The Basque failed to make it out of the group stages of the UEFA Champions League.

== Season summary ==
Philippe Montanier, who left for Rennes, was replaced by Jagoba Arrasate, his assistant manager. The club's pre-season was marked by the shock sale of Asier Illarramendi to Real Madrid. Real Sociedad lost the player that had been its most influential midfielder during the previous season. The club signed Haris Seferovic, Esteban Granero and José Ángel on loan.

=== Participation in the UEFA Champions League ===
In the Champions League preliminary round draw, Real Sociedad were not seeded and were to face seeded opponents from Europe's biggest leagues. They were drawn against Lyon, with the second leg to be played in Anoeta. Preparations for the Champions league play-off round were marked by the long-term injuries of Mikel González, Imanol Agirretxe and Diego Ifrán.

Pre-season consisted of matches against lower division Basque clubs, Sporting CP and English clubs. These matches were disappointing for Real Sociedad in both results and quality of play.

The first official game of the season was played at home against Getafe. The Madrilians were easily beaten a few days before travelling to Lyon. At the Stade Gerland, Real Sociedad inflicted the hosts a shock defeat with a 0–2 result. After an unremarkable draw at Elche that weekend, Real Sociedad welcomed Lyon. Once again, the French were convincingly beaten with a 2–0 scoreline, thus securing progression to the 2013–14 Champions League group stage for the Basques.

With no European participations in its five preceding seasons, Real Sociedad were seeded in pot 4. In the draw, they grouped with Manchester United, Shakhtar Donetsk and Bayer Leverkusen, the first two clubs being holding champions of their respective leagues.

The Champions League had a bitter outcome for Real Sociedad. The first two matches were fairly balanced, but late goals in both games meant being bottom right before a double confrontation with Manchester United. As expected, Real Sociedad was comprehensively outplayed in both matches against the Red Devils. However, they only conceded one goal, in Manchester. With a single point after four matches, their chances of surviving this stage looked slim, eventually losing their last two matches.

=== Copa del rey ===
Thanks to being in the Champions League Real Sociedad entered the second pot in the Copa del Rey. This meant they faced an opponent from Segunda División B or Tercera División in the round of 32. Algeciras was easily beaten on a 5–1 aggregate while resting some of the main players. In the quarterfinals Real Sociedad faced Villarreal. Both sides played with many substitutes in their starting lineups. Real Sociedad went through on a 0–1 aggregate score. A bizarre tie against Racing de Santander followed. The Cantabrians refused to play the second leg unless their club's governing body resigned. The match wasn't played and Real sociedad advanced to the next round. Barcelona awaited in the semi-finals, in a prestigious tie that was eventually won by the Catalans. Refereeing in the first leg was surrounded by controversy.

Reaching the semifinals was the best performance in the cup since 1988.

=== League ===
In the league Real Sociedad started slowly but stabilized in the sixth position in late November. Exiting European competition only helped the club, focusing efforts on domestic duties. The last game played in 2013 was the derby against Athletic Bilbao. Real Sociedad emerged victorious from a very physical battle. At that point it seemed like Real Sociedad would fight for fourth spot with Athletic Bilbao. An emphatic 5–1 demolition at the hands of Villarreal right after the derby created doubts.

==== January and February ====
January and February were very positive and fourth spot still appeared attainable. The highlight of this period was the convincing 3–1 victory over Barcelona in Anoeta. This happened after Barcelona's controversial victory in the Copa del Rey and was seen by many as a revenge.

==== March and onwards ====
In March, the team's performances worsened drastically and the Basques unexpectedly lost to Rayo Vallecano at home (2–3) and Almería away (4–3). Athletic Bilbao comfortably ensured fourth place and Real Sociedad found itself in a fight to avoid seventh place against Villarreal and Sevilla. Defeat to Villarreal on the last matchday meant Real Sociedad finished seventh and had to play third qualifying round of the UEFA Europa League in July 2014.

During this season, Real Sociedad played more matches than ever in its history. This and the early preparations for the Champions League preliminary round were suggested to be behind the drop in stamina that happened from March onwards.

The performances of Carlos Vela and Antoine Griezmann were the highlight of the season. These two ended up as joint top goal scorers and made the difference in many matches.

=== Others ===
In November 2013, Real Sociedad and Kazakh club Astana signed a cooperation agreement.

On 20 January 2014, it was announced that Carlos Vela had won the La Liga Player of the Month for December and Arrasate the La Liga Manager of the Month. In April 2014, Arrasate had his contract renewed until 2016.

In 2014, Real Sociedad were awarded the 2013–14 Liga BBVA Fair Play Club prize at the 2014 LFP Awards Ceremony.

==== Annual general meeting ====
In December 2013, the annual general meeting took place. In addition to approving the new budget and the previous year's accounts a governing body had to be voted. This has to be done every five years and Jokin Aperribay had been voted in during 2008. As expected, Aperribay and the rest of the governing body were comfortably re-elected.

== Squad ==
Note: Flags indicate national team as defined under FIFA eligibility rules; some limited exceptions apply. Players may hold more than one non-FIFA nationality.

No.	Pos.	Nation	Player
1	GK	CHI	Claudio Bravo
2	DF	ESP	Carlos Martínez
3	DF	ESP	Mikel González
4	MF	ESP	Gorka Elustondo
5	MF	ESP	Markel Bergara
6	DF	ESP	Iñigo Martínez
7	MF	FRA	Antoine Griezmann
8	FW	SUI	Haris Seferovic
9	FW	ESP	Imanol Agirretxe
10	MF	ESP	Xabi Prieto
11	FW	MEX	Carlos Vela

No.	Pos.	Nation	Player
13	GK	ESP	Eñaut Zubikarai
14	MF	ESP	Rubén Pardo
15	DF	ESP	Ion Ansotegi
17	MF	FRA	David Zurutuza
18	MF	URU	Chory Castro
19	DF	ALG	Liassine Cadamuro-Bentaïba
20	DF	ESP	José Ángel
21	FW	URU	Diego Ifrán
22	DF	ESP	Dani Estrada
23	MF	ESP	Javier Ros
24	DF	ESP	Alberto de la Bella

== Start formations ==
Starting XI

Lineup that started most of the club's competitive matches throughout the season.

No.	Pos.	Nat.	Name	MS	Notes
1	GK	(Chile)	Claudio Bravo	42	
2	RB	(Spain)	C. Martínez	28	
6	CB	(Spain)	I. Martínez	46	
3	CB	(Spain)	González	25	
24	LB	(Spain)	De la Bella	22	
8	MF	(Spain)	Pardo	25	
5	MF	(Spain)	Markel	38	
10	AM	(Spain)	Prieto	27	
11	AM	(Mexico)	Vela	45	
7	AM	(France)	Griezmann	41	
9	FW	(Spain)	Agirretxe	23	

== Player transfers ==
=== In ===
No.	Pos.	Nat.	Name	Age	EU	Moving from	Type	Transfer window	Ends	Transfer fee	Source
12	FW	(Spain)	Joseba Llorente	33	EU	Osasuna	Loan return	Summer		N/A	
20	LB	(Spain)	José Ángel	23	EU	Roma (Italy)	Loan	Summer	2014	N/A	Real Sociedad
17	FW	(Switzerland)	Haris Seferovic	21	EU	Fiorentina (Italy)	Transfer	Summer	2017	€2M	Real Sociedad
25	CM	(Spain)	Esteban Granero	26	EU	Queens Park Rangers (England)	Loan	Summer	2014	N/A	Real Sociedad
?	AM	(Spain)	Sergio Canales	22	EU	Valencia	Transfer	Winter	2018	N/A	Real Sociedad

Total expenditure: €2 million

=== Out ===
No.	Pos.	Nat.	Name	Age	EU	Moving to	Type	Transfer window	Transfer fee	Source
20	LB	(Spain)	José Ángel	23	EU	Roma (Italy)	Loan end	Summer	N/A	
	FW	(Spain)	Joseba Llorente	33	EU		Contract rescinded	Summer	N/A	Real Sociedad
8	CM	(Spain)	Asier Illarramendi	23	EU	Real Madrid	Transfer	Summer	€38.9M	Real Sociedad
19	DF	(Algeria)	Liassine Cadamuro-Bentaïba	25	EU	RCD Mallorca	Loan	Winter	N/A	Real Sociedad
21	FW	(Uruguay)	Diego Ifrán	26	Non-EU	Deportivo La Coruña	Loan	Winter	N/A	Real Sociedad

Total revenue: €38.9 million Net income: ▲€36.9 million

== Technical staff ==
Position	Name
First team manager	Jagoba Arrasate
1st Assistant coach	José María "Txema" Lumbreras
2nd Assistant coach	Bittor Alkiza
Goalkeeping coach	Roberto Navajas
Physical trainer	Karla Larburu

== Competitions ==
=== Legend ===
Win Draw Loss Postponed

=== Pre-season and friendlies ===
12 July 2013 Friendly	Mondragón CF (Spain)	0 – 12	(Spain) Real Sociedad	Arrasate
19:00 CET		Report	20', 24', 28' Vela; 37' Pardo; 44' Zurutuza; 47', 89' Agirretxe; 65', 67' Prieto; 79' Ros; 81' De la Bella; 86' Sangalli	Stadium: Mojategi

20 July 2013 Friendly	Toulouse (France)	1 – 1	(Spain) Real Sociedad	Beasain
19:00 CET	Griezmann 10'	Report	78' Sylla	Stadium: Loinatz; Referee: Sagués Oscoz (Spain)

24 July 2013 Friendly	Real Unión (Spain)	1 – 7	(Spain) Real Sociedad	Irun
19:30 CET	Valín 19'	Report	31' Ansotegi; 41' Agirretxe; 58' Griezmann; 70', 72', 80' (pen.), 89' Seferovic	Stadium: Stadium Gal; Referee: Azpilikueta Saldias (Spain)

27 July 2013 Friendly	Sporting CP (Portugal)	2 – 0	(Spain) Real Sociedad	Lisbon
20:45 CET	Maurício 22'; A. Silva 55'	Report		Stadium: Estádio José Alvalade; Attendance: 28,394; Referee: Hugo Miguel (Portugal)

31 July 2013 Friendly	Eibar (Spain)	0 – 2	(Spain) Real Sociedad	Zarautz
19:00 CET		Report	39' Castro; 58' Agirretxe	Stadium: Asti; Referee: Aitor Gorostegui Fernández Ortega (Spain)

3 August 2013 Friendly	Tottenham Hotspur Reserves (England)	Cancelled	(Spain) Real Sociedad	London

3 August 2013 Friendly	Histon (England)	1 – 8	(Spain) Real Sociedad	Impington
19:00 CET	Beckles 85'	Report	34', 84' Seferovic; 42' Vela; 63', 66' Castro; 76' Elustondo; 87' Sangalli; 88' Pardo	Stadium: Bridge Road; Referee: Alan Young (England)

6 August 2013 Friendly	Norwich City (England)	1 – 1	(Spain) Real Sociedad	Norwich
20:45 CET	Van Wolfswinkel 12'; Turner (yellow card) 13'; Ferl (yellow card) 58'	Report	66' Vela; (yellow card) 56' José Ángel	Stadium: Carrow Road; Attendance: 14,433; Referee: Martin Atkinson (England)

10 August 2013 Friendly	Southampton (England)	4 – 3	(Spain) Real Sociedad	Southampton
	Lallana 7'; Schneiderlin 33'; Hooiveld 40'; Puncheon 83'; Lambert (yellow card) 45'	Report	29' Elustondo; 38' Vela; 59' Seferovic; (yellow card) 45' De la Bella	Stadium: St Mary's Stadium; Attendance: 8,434; Referee: Darren Sheldrake (England)

=== La Liga ===
==== League table ====
Pos	Team	Pld	W	D	L	GF	GA	GD	Pts	Qualification or relegation
5	Sevilla	38	18	9	11	69	52	+17	63	Qualification for the Europa League group stage (Note: Sevilla automatically qualified for the 2014–15 UEFA Europa League group stage as the defending champions; the berth through their league position was vacated.)
6	Villarreal	38	17	8	13	60	44	+16	59 (Note: Villarreal finished ahead of Real Sociedad on head-to-head points: Villarreal 5–1 Real Sociedad, Real Sociedad 1–2 Villarreal.)	Qualification for the Europa League play-off round (Note: Since both the 2013–14 Copa del Rey champions (Real Madrid) and runners-up (Barcelona) qualified for the 2014–15 UEFA Champions League, the 5th, 6th and 7th placed teams qualified for the group stage, play-off round and third qualifying round of the 2014–15 UEFA Europa League respectively.)
7	Real Sociedad	38	16	11	11	62	55	+7	59	Qualification for the Europa League third qualifying round
8	Valencia	38	13	10	15	51	53	−2	49	
9	Celta Vigo	38	14	7	17	49	54	−5	49	

Source: La Liga, ESPN
Rules for classification: 1st points; 2nd head-to-head points;

==== Results summary ====
Overall								Home						Away					
Pld	W	D	L	GF	GA	GD	Pts	W	D	L	GF	GA	GD	W	D	L	GF	GA	GD
38	16	11	11	62	55	+7	59	11	4	4	38	19	+19	5	7	7	24	36	−12

Last updated: 13 July 2014.
Source: League matches

==== Results by round ====
Round	1	2	3	4	5	6	7	8	9	10	11	12	13	14	15	16	17	18	19	20	21	22	23	24	25	26	27	28	29	30	31	32	33	34	35	36	37	38
Ground	H	A	H	A	H	A	H	A	A	H	A	H	A	H	A	H	A	H	A	A	H	A	H	A	H	A	H	H	A	H	A	H	A	H	A	H	A	H
Result	W	D	L	D	D	L	D	L	W	W	D	W	L	W	W	W	W	W	L	D	W	L	D	W	W	L	L	W	L	W	D	L	D	W	W	D	D	L
Position	4	7	8	7	7	12	13	15	12	9	9	7	7	6	6	6	5	5	6	6	6	6	6	6	6	6	6	5	6	6	6	6	7	6	6	6	6	7

A = Away; H = Home; W = Win; D = Draw; L = Loss

==== Matches ====
17 August 2013 1	Real Sociedad	2 – 0	Getafe	San Sebastián
19:00 CET	Vela 42'; Seferovic 70'; Ros (yellow card) 81'	Report	Escudero (yellow card) 52'	Stadium: Anoeta; Attendance: 24,466; Referee: Juan Martínez Munuera (Valencian Community)

24 August 2013 2	Elche	1 – 1	Real Sociedad	Elche
19:00 CET	Coro 2'; Botía (yellow card) 7'; Lombán (yellow card) 55'; Săpunaru (yellow card) 87'	Report	Vela (yellow card) 20', (goal) 74'; De la Bella (yellow card) 25'; I. Martínez (yellow card) 33'	Stadium: Manuel Martínez Valero; Attendance: 23,859; Referee: Pedro Jesús Pérez Montero (Andalusia)

31 August 2013 3	Real Sociedad	1 – 2	Atlético Madrid	San Sebastián
19:00 CET	Prieto 69'; Zurutuza (yellow card) 65'; Bravo (yellow card) 92'	Report	27' Villa; 56' Koke; (yellow card) 25' Turan; (yellow card) 54' Suárez; (yellow card) 73' Gabi; (yellow card) 79' Filipe Luís	Stadium: Anoeta; Attendance: 27,604

14 September 2013 4	Levante	0 – 0	Real Sociedad	Valencia
18:00 (CEST)	Vyntra (yellow card) 37'; Rodas (yellow card) 64'; Pinto (yellow card) 91'	Report	(yellow card) 81' González	Stadium: Ciutat de València; Attendance: 13,000; Referee: Eduardo Prieto Iglesias

21 September 2013 5	Real Sociedad	0 – 0	Málaga	San Sebastián
16:00 (CEST)	I. Martínez (yellow card) 19'; Prieto (yellow card) 41'; Pardo (yellow card) 46'	Report	(yellow card) 48' Angeleri; (yellow card) 73' Sánchez	Stadium: Anoeta; Attendance: 25,265; Referee: José Teixeira Vitienes

24 September 2013 6	Barcelona	4 – 1	Real Sociedad	Barcelona
20:00 (CEST)	Neymar 5'; Messi 8'; Busquets 23'; Bartra 77'	Report	Agirretxe (yellow card) 55'; De la Bella 64'	Stadium: Camp Nou; Attendance: 70,066; Referee: Gil Manzano

28 September 2013 7	Real Sociedad	1 – 1	Sevilla	San Sebastián
20:00 (CEST)	Griezmann 66'	Report	18' Jairo; (yellow card) 15' Figueiras; (yellow card) 55' Rakitić; (yellow card) 69' (yellow-red card) 85' Cala; (yellow card) 72' Cristóforo; (yellow card) 74' Moreno	Stadium: Anoeta; Referee: Velasco Carballo

6 October 2013 8	Rayo Vallecano	1 – 0	Real Sociedad	Vallecas
18:00 (CEST)	Viera 89' (pen.) (yellow card) 90+4'; Adrián (yellow card) 70'	Report	(yellow card) 57' Zurutuza; (yellow card) 88' Bravo	Stadium: Campo de Vallecas; Attendance: 9,000; Referee: Javier Estrada Fernández

20 October 2013 9	Valencia	1 – 2	Real Sociedad	Valencia
18:00 (CEST)	Pabón 89'; Fuego (yellow card) 40'; Banega (yellow card) 40'; Ruiz (yellow card) 75'	Report	40' Griezmann; 58' Pardo; (yellow card) 3' De la Bella	Stadium: Mestalla; Attendance: 35,000; Referee: Alejandro Hernández Hernández

27 October 2013 10	Real Sociedad	3 – 0	Almería	Anoeta
19:00 (CEST)	Griezmann 12' 49'; José Ángel 55'; Pardo (yellow card) 35'	Report	(yellow card) 4' Rodri; (yellow card) 48' Torsiglieri; (yellow card) 53' Rafita	Attendance: 24,300; Referee: Teixeira Vitienes

30 October 2013 11	Real Valladolid	2 – 2	Real Sociedad	Valladolid
20:00 (CEST)	Larsson 76'; Guerra 79'; Rueda (yellow card) 30'; Ebert (yellow card) 45'; Rossi (yellow card) 49'; Rubio (yellow card) 60'	Report	15', 53' Griezmann; (yellow card) 90' González	Stadium: Nuevo José Zorrilla; Attendance: 15,000; Referee: Antonio Mateu Lahoz

3 November 2013 12	Real Sociedad	5 – 0	Osasuna	San Sebastián
16:00 (CEST)	Ansotegi 33'; I. Martínez 47'; Griezmann (yellow card) 33', (goal) 56'; Castro 81'; Seferovic 88'; Elustondo (yellow card) 53'	Report	(red card) 49' Jordan Lotiès	Stadium: Anoeta; Attendance: 21,000; Referee: Carlos del Cerro Grande

9 November 2013 13	Real Madrid	5 – 1	Real Sociedad	Madrid
16:00 CET (UTC+01:00)	Ronaldo 12', 26' (pen.), 76'; Benzema 18'; Pepe 36'; Khedira (yellow card) 29'; Arbeloa (yellow card) 53'	Report	61' Griezmann; (yellow card) 76' González	Stadium: Estadio Santiago Bernabéu; Attendance: 77,427; Referee: Juan Martínez Munuera (Valencian Community)

24 November 2013 14	Real Sociedad	4 – 3	Celta Vigo	San Sebastián
18:00 (CEST)	Vela 6', 61', 78', 81'; Prieto (yellow card) 68'; Bergara (yellow card) 70'	Report	23', 56' Rafinha; 28' López; (yellow card) 24' Cabral; (yellow card) 31' (yellow-red card) 65' Fontàs; (yellow card) 69' Yoel	Stadium: Anoeta; Attendance: 21,000; Referee: César Muñiz Fernández

1 December 2013 15	Espanyol	1 – 2	Real Sociedad	Cornellà de Llobregat
22:00 (CEST)	Córdoba (yellow card) 7', (goal) 31'; Stuani (yellow card) 42'; Fuentes (yellow card) 59'; López (yellow card) 79'	Report	I. Martínez (yellow card) 53'; Griezmann 69'; González (yellow card) 80'; Stuani 88' (o.g.); Seferovic (yellow card) 89'	Stadium: Cornellà El-Prat; Attendance: 14,575; Referee: Fernando Teixeira Vitienes

15 December 2013 16	Real Sociedad	5 – 1	Real Betis	San Sebastián
17:00 (CEST)	Agirretxe 6', 62'; Ansotegi 55', (yellow card) 48'; Griezmann 62', (yellow card) 66'; Prieto 85', (yellow card) 39'; I. Martínez (yellow card) 7'	Report	Molina 19', (yellow card) 60'; Amaya (yellow card) 44'	Stadium: Anoeta; Attendance: 22,000; Referee: Antonio Mateu Lahoz

22 December 2013 17	Granada	1 – 3	Real Sociedad	Granada
22:00 (CEST)	Piti 37'; Brahimi (yellow card) 44'; Recio (yellow card) 51'; Riki (yellow card) 77'	Report	29', 64' Vela; 42' Griezmann; (yellow card) 72' Prieto	Stadium: Nuevo Los Cármenes; Attendance: 11,500; Referee: Carlos Clos Gómez

5 January 2014 18	Real Sociedad	2 – 0	Athletic Bilbao	San Sebastián
20:00 (CEST)	Griezmann 43'; Pardo 90+3'	Report		Stadium: Anoeta; Referee: Pedro Jesús Pérez Montero (Andalusia)

12 January 2014 19	Villarreal	5 – 1	Real Sociedad	Villarreal
22:00 (CEST)	Costa (yellow card) 7'; Dos Santos 17', 33'; Bruno (yellow card) 20'; Uche 27', 55'; Gómez 58'	Report	(yellow card) 2' José Ángel; 60' Agirretxe; (yellow card) 72' Zurutuza; (yellow card) 73' Ros; (yellow card) 76' C. Martínez	Stadium: El Madrigal; Referee: Carlos Velasco Carballo

19 January 2014 20	Getafe	2 – 2	Real Sociedad	Getafe
20:00 (CEST)	Marica 28'; Míchel (yellow card) 35'; Borja (yellow card) 42'; Rafa (yellow card) 48' (yellow-red card) 62'; Pedro León 53'; D. Castro (yellow card) 62'	Report	4', 16' Agirretxe; (yellow card) 38' José Ángel; (yellow card) 54' Vela	Stadium: Coliseum Alfonso Pérez; Referee: David Fernández Borbalán

26 January 2014 21	Real Sociedad	4 – 0	Elche	San Sebastián
22:00 (CEST)	Suárez 2' (o.g.); Griezmann 12', 74'; Vela 50'; Gaztañaga (yellow card) 90'	Report	(yellow card) 23' Botía; (yellow card) 70' Pérez	Stadium: Anoeta; Attendance: 10,492; Referee: Ignacio Iglesias Villanueva

2 February 2014 22	Atlético Madrid	4 – 0	Real Sociedad	Madrid
19:00 (CEST)	Miranda (yellow card) 22', (goal) 74'; Villa 38'; Koke (yellow card) 39'; García (yellow card) 69'; Costa 72' Diego 87'	Report	Zurutuza (yellow card) 17'; I. Martínez (yellow card) 84'	Stadium: Vicente Calderón; Attendance: 51,800; Referee: Javier Estrada

9 February 2014 23	Real Sociedad	0 – 0	Levante	San Sebastián
19:00 (CEST)	I. Martínez (yellow card) 90+2'; C. Martínez (yellow card) 90+3'	Report	(yellow card) 18' Vyntra; (yellow card) 75' Nagore; (yellow card) 87' Ivanschitz	Stadium: Anoeta; Attendance: 23,788; Referee: Carlos Clos Gómez

16 February 2014 24	Málaga	0 – 1	Real Sociedad	Málaga
22:00 (CEST)	Antunes (yellow card) 39'; Ferreira (yellow card) 90'; Duda (yellow card) 90+3'	Report	Vela 10'	Stadium: La Rosaleda; Attendance: 19,500; Referee: Carlos del Cerro Grande

23 February 2014 25	Real Sociedad	3 – 1	Barcelona	San Sebastián
20:00 (CEST)	Song 32' (o.g.); Griezmann 54'; Zurutuza 59'; José Ángel (yellow card) 23'; Canales (yellow card) 69'	Report	Busquets (yellow card) 22'; Messi 36'; Bartra (yellow card) 39'; Piqué (yellow card) 52'	Stadium: Anoeta; Referee: David Fernández Borbalán

2 March 2014 26	Sevilla	1 – 0	Real Sociedad	Seville
19:00 (CEST)	Fazio (yellow card) 53'; Gameiro 77'; Moreno (yellow card) 90'	Report	Zaldúa (yellow card) 7'; José Ángel (yellow card) 56'; I. Martínez (yellow card) 60'; Griezmann (yellow card) 66'	Stadium: Ramón Sánchez Pizjuán; Attendance: 29,618; Referee: Alejandro José Hernández Hernández

10 March 2014 27	Real Sociedad	2 – 3	Rayo Vallecano	San Sebastián
22:00 (CEST)	I. Martínez 2'; Pardo 46'	Report	4' (pen.) Larrivey; 47' Bueno; 67' Rochina; (yellow card) 34' Gálvez; (yellow card) 55' Saúl; (yellow card) 77' Arbilla	Stadium: Anoeta; Attendance: 17,500; Referee: Alfonso Javier Álvarez Izquierdo

16 March 2014 28	Real Sociedad	1 – 0	Valencia	San Sebastián
21:00 (CEST)	Agirretxe 61'; Bravo (yellow card) 92'; José Ángel (yellow card) 93'	Report	(yellow card) 41' Barragán; (yellow card) 64' Bernat; (yellow card) 87' Míchel; (yellow card) 92' Senderos	Stadium: Anoeta; Attendance: 28000; Referee: Javier Estrada Fernández

24 March 2014 29	Almería	4 – 3	Real Sociedad	Almería
22:00 (CEST)	Díaz 29' (yellow card) 63'; Verza 66' (pen.), 71' (pen.), (yellow card) 73'; Khaloua 90+1'; Trujillo (yellow card) 21'; Soriano (yellow card) 72'	Report	66' (pen.) Vela; 61' Agirretxe; 85' Bergara; (yellow card) 65' C. Martínez; (yellow card) 70' González; (yellow card) 87' De la Bella	Stadium: Los Juegos Mediterráneos; Attendance: 9,600; Referee: Miguel Ángel Ayza Gámez

27 March 2014 30	Real Sociedad	1 – 0	Real Valladolid	San Sebastián
20:00 (CEST)	Vela 23'; Pardo (yellow card) 36'; Griezmann (yellow card) 89'; Prieto (yellow card) 90'	Report	(yellow card) 43' Óscar; (yellow card) 66' Mitrović; (yellow card) 75' Guerra; (yellow card) 88' Pérez; (yellow card) 90+2' Rossi	Stadium: Anoeta; Attendance: 21,125; Referee: Carlos del Cerro Grande

30 March 2014 31	Osasuna	1 – 1	Real Sociedad	Pamplona
17:00 (CEST)	Armenteros (yellow card) 36'; De las Cuevas (yellow card) 37'; Loé (yellow card) 56'; Riera 59'; Lotiès (yellow card) 74'; Arribas (yellow card) 81'	Summary	Castro 8' (yellow card) 57'; Vela (yellow card) 32'; De la Bella (yellow card) 59'; González (yellow card) 90+1'; Canales (yellow card) 90+2'	Stadium: El Sadar; Attendance: 14,137; Referee: David Fernández Borbalán

5 April 2014 32	Real Sociedad	0 – 4	Real Madrid	San Sebastián
20:00 (CEST)	González (yellow card) 48'; I. Martínez (yellow card) 56'; Bergara (yellow card) 71'	Summary	Alonso (yellow card) 40'; Illarramendi 45', (yellow card) 50'; Bale 66'; Pepe 85'; Morata 88'; Carvajal (yellow card) 90+1'	Stadium: Anoeta; Attendance: 30,016; Referee: Alejandro Hernández Hernández

12 April 2014 33	Celta Vigo	2 – 2	Real Sociedad	Vigo
16:00 (CEST)	Nolito 37' (pen.); Mina 82'; Mallo (yellow card) 18'; Aurtenetxe (red card) 48'; Bermejo (yellow card) 53'; Cabral (yellow card) 67'	Report	8', (yellow card) 53' Canales; 43' (yellow card) 72' Griezmann; (yellow card) 29' I. Martínez; (yellow card) 64' Zaldúa; (yellow card) 80' Pardo	Stadium: Balaídos; Attendance: 21,500; Referee: Xavier Estrada Fernández

19 April 2014 34	Real Sociedad	2 – 1	Espanyol	San Sebastián
20:00 (CEST)	Canales 31'; Vela 90+1'; Pardo (yellow card) 90+3'	Report	23' Córdoba; (yellow card) 39' Sánchez	Stadium: Anoeta; Attendance: 20,382; Referee: Velasco Carballo

26 April 2014 35	Real Betis	0 – 1	Real Sociedad	Seville
22:00 (CEST)	Juan Carlos (yellow card) 30'; Rodríguez (yellow card) 38'	Report	Vela 48' (pen.)	Stadium: Benito Villamarín; Attendance: 20,600; Referee: Miguel Ángel Ayza Gámez

5 May 2014 36	Real Sociedad	1 – 1	Granada	San Sebastián
22:00 (CEST)	Seferovic (yellow card) 30'; González (red card) 57'; Vela 78'	Report	90+3', (yellow card) 90+5' Ighalo; (yellow card) 43' Riki; (yellow card) 48' (yellow-red card) 54' Recio; (yellow card) 58' Murillo	Stadium: Anoeta; Attendance: 13,813; Referee: Fernando Teixeira Vitienes

10 May 2014 37	Athletic Bilbao	1 – 1	Real Sociedad	Bilbao
17:00 (CEST)	San José (yellow card) 12'; Muniain 50', (yellow card) 90+4'; Toquero (yellow card) 90+1'	Report	75' Agirretxe; (yellow card) 26' I. Martínez; (yellow card) 55' Prieto; (yellow card) 90' Zurutuza	Stadium: San Mamés; Attendance: 33,000; Referee: Carlos del Cerro Grande

17 May 2014 38	Real Sociedad	1 – 2	Villarreal	San Sebastián
12:00 (CEST)	Vela 90+3'; Bergara (yellow card) 68'; Granero (yellow card) 87'	Report	26' Dos Santos; 69' Uche; (yellow card) 44' Jokić; (yellow card) 44' Musacchio; (yellow card) 89' Costa	Stadium: Anoeta; Attendance: 21,140; Referee: Velasco Carballo

=== Copa del Rey ===
==== Round of 32 ====
6 December 2013	Algeciras	1 – 1	Real Sociedad	Algeciras
18:00	Alfaro 64'		Griezmann 58'	Stadium: Nuevo Mirador; Attendance: 6,000; Referee: Ayza Gámez

18 December 2013	Real Sociedad	4 – 0 (5–1 agg.)	Algeciras	San Sebastián
19:30	Ros 40'; Seferovic 66'; Griezmann 70'; Vela 74'			Stadium: Anoeta; Referee: César Muñiz Fernández

==== Round of 16 ====
9 January 2014	Real Sociedad	0 – 0	Villarreal	San Sebastián
19:30		Report		Stadium: Anoeta; Referee: Alberto Undiano Mallenco

16 January 2014	Villarreal	0 – 1 (0–1 agg.)	Real Sociedad	Villarreal
13:00		Report	Ros 32'	Stadium: El Madrigal; Attendance: 15000; Referee: Eduardo Prieto Iglesias

==== Quarter-finals ====
22 January 2014	Real Sociedad	3 – 1	Racing Santander	San Sebastián
20:00	González 4', 33'; Vela 62'	Report	Koné 83'	Stadium: Anoeta; Attendance: 18911; Referee: Carlos Velasco Carballo

30 January 2014	Racing Santander	Suspended	Real Sociedad	Santander
20:00				Stadium: El Sardinero; Referee: Jesús Gil Manzano
Note: Match suspended in 1st minute at 0–0 due to Racing Santander's refusal to play.

==== Semi-finals ====
5 February 2014	Barcelona	2–0	Real Sociedad	Barcelona
22:00	Busquets 44'; Zubikarai 60' (o.g.)	Report		Stadium: Camp Nou; Referee: José Luis González González

12 February 2014	Real Sociedad	1 – 1 (1–3 agg.)	Barcelona	San Sebastián
22:00	Griezmann 87'	Report	Messi 27'	Stadium: Anoeta; Attendance: 28,153; Referee: Fernando Teixeira Vitienes

=== UEFA Champions League ===
==== Play-off round ====
20 August 2013 First leg	Lyon (France)	0 – 2	(Spain) Real Sociedad	Lyon, France
20:45 CEST	Lopes (yellow card) 43'; Biševac (yellow card) 37' (yellow-red card) 75'	Report	17' Griezmann; 50' Seferovic; (yellow card) 7' I. Martínez; (yellow card) 70' Zurutuza; (yellow card) 80' Prieto; (yellow card) 86' Cadamuro	Stadium: Stade de Gerland; Attendance: 38,156; Referee: Milorad Mažić (Serbia)

28 August 2013 Second leg	Real Sociedad (Spain)	2 – 0 (4 – 0 agg.)	(France) Lyon	San Sebastián, Spain
20:45 CEST	Vela 67', 90+1'	Report		Stadium: Anoeta Stadium; Attendance: 28,955; Referee: Damir Skomina (Slovenia)

==== Group stage ====
Pos	Team	Pld	W	D	L	GF	GA	GD	Pts	Qualification	MUN	LEV	SHK	RSO
1	(England) Manchester United	6	4	2	0	12	3	+9	14	Advance to knockout phase	—	4–2	1–0	1–0
2	(Germany) Bayer Leverkusen	6	3	1	2	9	10	−1	10	Advance to knockout phase	0–5	—	4–0	2–1
3	(Ukraine) Shakhtar Donetsk	6	2	2	2	7	6	+1	8	Transfer to Europa League	1–1	0–0	—	4–0
4	(Spain) Real Sociedad	6	0	1	5	1	10	−9	1		0–0	0–1	0–2	—

Source: UEFA

17 September 2013 1	Real Sociedad (Spain)	0 – 2	(Ukraine) Shakhtar Donetsk	Anoeta, San Sebastián
20:45		Report	Teixeira 65', 87'	Referee: Ovidiu Hațegan (Romania)

2 October 2013 2	Bayer Leverkusen (Germany)	2 – 1	(Spain) Real Sociedad	BayArena, Leverkusen
20:45	Rolfes 45+1'; Hegeler 90+2'	Report	Vela 52' (pen.)	Attendance: 27,462; Referee: Sergei Karasev (Russia)

23 October 2013 3	Manchester United (England)	1 – 0	(Spain) Real Sociedad	Manchester, England
20:45 CEST				Stadium: Old Trafford; Referee: Nicola Rizzoli (Italy

5 November 2013 4	Real Sociedad (Spain)	0 – 0	(England) Manchester United	San Sebastián, Spain
20:45 CET				Stadium: Anoeta

27 November 2013 5	Shakhtar Donetsk (Ukraine)	4–0	(Spain) Real Sociedad	Donbas Arena, Donetsk
20:45	Luiz Adriano 37'; Teixeira 48'; Douglas Costa 68', 87'	Report		Attendance: 44,348; Referee: Olegário Benquerença (Portugal)

10 December 2013 6	Real Sociedad (Spain)	0–1	(Germany) Bayer Leverkusen	Anoeta, San Sebastián
20:45		Report	Toprak 49'	Attendance: 23,408; Referee: Tom Harald Hagen (Norway)

== See also ==
- 2013–14 Copa del Rey
- 2013–14 La Liga
- 2013–14 UEFA Champions League
