= 2014–15 Real Sociedad season =

Real Sociedad
2014–15 season
- President: Jokin Aperribay
- Head coach: Jagoba Arrasate (until 2 November 2014); David Moyes
- Stadium: Anoeta Stadium
- La Liga: 12th
- Copa del Rey: Round of 16
- UEFA Europa League: Play-off round
- Top goalscorer: League: Carlos Vela (9); All: Carlos Vela (10)
Home colours	Away colours	Third colours

The 2014–15 season was Real Sociedad's 68th season in La Liga. This article shows player statistics and all matches (official and friendly) that the club played during the 2014–15 season.

== Season summary ==
In the summer of 2014, Antoine Griezmann was sold to Atlético Madrid while top forward Carlos Vela missed the early stages of the season due to fitness issues. Most performances during pre-season were poor. Real Sociedad faced Scottish side Aberdeen in the UEFA Europa League Third qualifying round. Real Socieded progressed 5–2 on aggregate, although the second leg, away from home, was far from convincing. In the next round, Real Sociedad were emphatically beaten by Russian club Krasnodar. In addition, Gerónimo Rulli suffered a serious injury on his debut.

The early months of the Liga season followed the same pattern. In early November, Real Sociedad found themselves second from bottom, prompting the club to relieve Jagoba Arrasate of his duties after just the tenth matchday. Soon after his dismissal, former Everton and Manchester United manager David Moyes was announced as the replacement. The Scotsman led the club out of the lower zone of the table and a strong series of results during February and March dispelled fears of relegation. In April, results worsened again, with the club ultimately ending the season in 12th.

In the Copa del Rey, Real Sociedad eliminated Real Oviedo but fell short against their next opponents, Villarreal.

=== Others ===
In the summer of 2014, Real Sociedad reached an agreement with sportswear manufacturers Adidas which, on 1 July, became the official suppliers of the team's kit and training clothing for all categories from youth to the first team squad.

On 11 August, Real Sociedad announced an agreement with Qbao.com in which the Chinese company became the club's main sponsor. As part of the new collaboration, the Qbao.com logo was displayed on the first team shirt during the 2014–15 season. The agreement was later renewed until 2020.

Real Sociedad reached an agreement with Spanish telecommunications provider Telefónica for the lease of audio-visual rights for the team's league matches for the 2015–16 season.

On 10 December, it was announced that Carlos Vela was named La Liga Player of the Month for November.

== Squad ==
Note: Flags indicate national team as defined under FIFA eligibility rules; some limited exceptions apply. Players may hold more than one non-FIFA nationality.

No.	Pos.	Nation	Player
1	GK	ARG	Gerónimo Rulli
2	DF	ESP	Carlos Martínez
3	DF	ESP	Mikel González
4	MF	ESP	Gorka Elustondo
5	MF	ESP	Markel Bergara
6	DF	ESP	Iñigo Martínez
7	FW	ISL	Alfreð Finnbogason
8	MF	ESP	Esteban Granero
9	FW	ESP	Imanol Agirretxe
10	MF	ESP	Xabi Prieto
11	FW	MEX	Carlos Vela
13	GK	ESP	Eñaut Zubikarai

No.	Pos.	Nation	Player
14	MF	ESP	Rubén Pardo
15	DF	ESP	Ion Ansotegi
16	MF	ESP	Sergio Canales
17	MF	FRA	David Zurutuza
18	MF	URU	Chory Castro
19	DF	ESP	Yuri Berchiche
20	DF	ESP	Joseba Zaldúa
21	DF	ALG	Liassine Cadamuro-Bentaïba
22	DF	ESP	Dani Estrada
23	MF	ESP	Jon Gaztañaga
24	DF	ESP	Alberto de la Bella

== Start formations ==
Starting XI

Lineup that started most of the club's competitive matches throughout the league.

No.	Pos.	Nat.	Name	MS	Notes
1	GK	(Argentina)	Rulli	22	
20	RB	(Spain)	Zaldúa	28	
6	CB	(Spain)	I. Martínez	34	
3	CB	(Spain)	Ansotegi	19	
24	LB	(Spain)	De la Bella	19	
8	MF	(Spain)	Pardo	21	
5	MF	(Spain)	Granero	29	
10	AM	(Spain)	Prieto	27	
11	AM	(Mexico)	Vela	45	
16	AM	(Spain)	Canales	31	
9	FW	(Spain)	Agirretxe	23	

== Player transfers ==
=== In ===
No.	Pos.	Nat.	Name	Age	EU	Moving from	Type	Transfer window	Ends	Transfer fee	Source
7	FW	(Iceland)	Alfreð Finnbogason	25	EU	Heerenveen (Netherlands)	Transfer	Summer	2018	N/A	Real Sociedad
8	MF	(Spain)	Esteban Granero	28	EU	Queens Park Rangers (England)	Transfer	Summer	2018	N/A	Real Sociedad
1	GK	(Argentina)	Gerónimo Rulli	22	Non-EU	Deportivo Maldonado (Uruguay)	Loan	Summer	2015	N/A	Real Sociedad
*	DF	(Spain)	Raúl Navas	27	EU	Free agent	Transfer	Summer	2015	N/A	Real Sociedad
21	DF	(Algeria)	Liassine Cadamuro-Bentaïba	26	EU	Mallorca	Loan return	Summer	2015	N/A	Real Sociedad
*	FW	(Uruguay)	Diego Ifrán	27	EU	Deportivo La Coruña (Spain)	Loan return	Summer	2015	N/A	Real Sociedad

=== Out ===
No.	Pos.	Nat.	Name	Age	EU	Moving to	Type	Transfer window	Transfer fee	Source
7	FW	(France)	Antoine Griezmann	23	EU	Atlético Madrid	Transfer	Summer	N/A	Real Sociedad
8	FW	(Switzerland)	Haris Seferovic	22	EU	Eintracht Frankfurt (Germany)	Transfer	Summer	N/A	Real Sociedad
1	GK	(Chile)	Claudio Bravo	31	EU	Barcelona (Spain)	Transfer	Summer	N/A	Real Sociedad
	FW	(Uruguay)	Diego Ifrán	27	EU	CD Tenerife (Spain)	Loan	Summer	N/A	Real Sociedad
	DF	(Spain)	Raúl Navas	27	EU	Eibar	Loan	Summer	N/A	Real Sociedad
	DF	(Algeria)	Liassine Cadamuro-Bentaïba	26	EU	Osasuna (Spain)	Loan	Summer	N/A	Real Sociedad
	MF	(Spain)	Pablo Hervías	21	EU	Osasuna	Loan	Winter	N/A	Osasuna
23	DF	(Spain)	Jon Gaztañaga	23	EU	Ponferradina	Loan	Winter	N/A	Real Sociedad
23	DF	(Spain)	Javi Ros	24	EU	RCD Mallorca	End of contract	Summer	€0	RCD Mallorca
26	GK	(Spain)	Kike Royo	23	EU		Contract rescinded	Summer		Real Sociedad
20	LB	(Spain)	José Ángel	24	EU	Roma (Italy)	Loan end	Summer	N/A	
25	MF	(Spain)	Esteban Granero	27	EU	Queens Park Rangers (England)	Loan end	Summer	N/A	

== Pre-season ==
12 July 2014 Friendly	Tolosa	0–2	Real Sociedad	Tolosa
19:00 CET		(Report)	43' Agirretxe; 54' I. Martínez	Stadium: Berazubi; Attendance: 2,200; Referee: Dani Palencia

19 July 2014 Friendly	Ajax	3–1	Real Sociedad	Hardenberg
14:30 CET	Milik 15'; C. Martínez 74' (o.g.); El Ghazi 90'	(Report)	10' Finnbogason	Stadium: De Boshoek; Referee: Tom van Siechum

23 July 2014 Friendly	Feyenoord	1–1	Real Sociedad	Rotterdam
	Te Vrede 40'	Report	9' Prieto	Stadium: De Kuip; Referee: Reinold Wiedemeijer

28 July 2014 Friendly	NEC	0–1	Real Sociedad	Nijmegen
		Report	18' Canales	Stadium: Goffertstadion; Referee: Pol van Boekel

3 August 2014 Friendly	Alavés	3–1	Real Sociedad	Vitoria-Gasteiz
	Llamas 29'; Juanma 41'; Andoni Benito 48'	Report	64' Agirretxe	Stadium: Mendizorrotza Stadium; Attendance: 9,886
Note: Arabako Foru Aldundia Trophy

10 August 2014 Friendly	Newcastle United	1–0	Real Sociedad	Newcastle, England
14:30 CET	Sissoko 88'	Report		Stadium: St James' Park; Attendance: 19,188; Referee: Chris Foy

12 August 2014 Friendly	Chelsea	2–0	Real Sociedad	London, England
20:45 CET	Costa 2', 7'	Report		Stadium: Stamford Bridge

16 August 2014 Friendly	Eibar	0–1	Real Sociedad	Zarautz
18:30 CET		(Report)	18' Agirretxe	Stadium: Asti sports complex Attendance: 2,200; Referee: Gorka Sagués

== Competitions ==
=== Overall ===
Competition	Started round	Current position / round	Final position / round	First match	Last match
La Liga	—	14		24 August 2014	24 May 2015
Copa del Rey	Round of 32	Round of 32		4 December 2014	14 January 2015
UEFA Europa League	Third qualifying round	—	Play-off round	31 July 2014	28 August 2014

Updated to match played 17 December 2014
Source: Competitions

=== La Liga ===
==== League table ====
Pos	Team	Pld	W	D	L	GF	GA	GD	Pts	Qualification or relegation
10	Espanyol	38	13	10	15	47	51	−4	49 (Note: Espanyol ahead on head-to-head record; Rayo Vallecano–Espanyol 1–3, Espanyol–Rayo Vallecano 1–1.)	
11	Rayo Vallecano	38	15	4	19	46	68	−22	49	
12	Real Sociedad	38	11	13	14	44	51	−7	46	
13	Elche (Note: Elche administratively relegated by the LFP.) (R)	38	11	8	19	35	62	−27	41	Relegation to Segunda División
14	Levante	38	9	10	19	34	67	−33	37 (Note: Levante ahead on head-to-head record; Levante–Getafe 1–1, Getafe–Levante 0–1.)	

Source: La Liga
Rules for classification: 1) points; 2) head-to-head points; 3) head-to-head goal difference; 4) goal difference; 5) number of goals scored; 6) fair-play points; 7) playoff match
(R) Relegated

==== Results by round ====
Round	1	2	3	4	5	6	7	8	9	10	11	12	13	14	15	16	17	18	19	20	21	22	23	24	25	26	27	28	29	30	31	32	33	34	35	36	37	38
Ground	A	H	A	H	A	H	A	H	A	H	H	A	H	A	H	A	H	A	H	H	A	H	A	H	A	H	A	H	A	A	H	A	H	A	H	A	H	A
Result	L	W	D	L	L	D	L	L	D	L	W	D	W	L	D	D	W	D	L	W	L	D	D	W	L	W	W	W	D	L	D	L	D	D	W	L	L	W
Position	16	8	7	12	14	15	15	16	17	19	15	16	14	14	14	14	13	12	12	11	13	12	12	10	12	11	10	9	10	11	11	12	12	12	12	12	12	12

A = Away; H = Home; W = Win; D = Draw; L = Loss

==== Matches ====
Kickoff times are in CET. Win Draw Loss

24 August 2014 1	Eibar	1–0	Real Sociedad	Eibar
19:00 CEST	Lara 45'; Arruabarrena (yellow card) 52'; Errasti (yellow card) 60'; Navas (yellow card) 89'; García (yellow card) 90+1'	Report	Berchiche (yellow card) 68'	Stadium: Ipurua; Attendance: 5,173

31 August 2014 2	Real Sociedad	4–2	Real Madrid	San Sebastián
21:00 CEST	I. Martínez 35'; Zurutuza 41', 65'; Vela 75'		Ramos 5'; Bale 11'	Stadium: Anoeta; Attendance: 27,879; Referee: Juan Martínez Munuera

13 September 2014 3	Celta Vigo	2–2	Real Sociedad	Vigo
22:00 CEST	Orellana 28'; Larrivey 48'	Report	Agirretxe 69'; Jonny 90+2' (o.g.)	Stadium: Balaídos

21 September 2014 4	Real Sociedad	1–2	Almería	San Sebastián
12:00 CEST	Bergara (yellow card) 56'; Castro 84'	Report	(yellow card) 23' Jonathan; 23' (o.g.) De la Bella; 51' Dos Santos; (yellow card) 53' (yellow-red card) 78' Dubarbier; (yellow card) 56' Soriano; (yellow card) 56' Trujillo; (yellow card) 64' Verza; (yellow card) 72' Thomas; (yellow card) 88' Navarro	Stadium: Anoeta; Attendance: 18,000; Referee: Xavier Estrada Fernández

24 September 2014 5	Sevilla	1–0	Real Sociedad	Seville
22:00 CEST	Deulofeu 18'; Figueiras (yellow card) 47'; Mbia (yellow card) 48'; Kolodziejczak (yellow card) 53'; Bacca (yellow card) 55'; Trémoulinas (yellow card) 76'; Beto (yellow card) 78'	Report	González (yellow card) 9'; Granero (yellow card) 64'	Stadium: Ramón Sánchez Pizjuán; Referee: Antonio Mateu Lahoz

28 September 2014 6	Real Sociedad	1–1	Valencia	San Sebastián
19:00 CEST	Vela (yellow card); Canales 36'; Bergara (yellow card)	Report	Gil 15'; Otamendi (yellow card) 26'; Gomes (yellow card) 35'; Fuego (yellow card) 65'; Feghouli (yellow card) 71'; Gayà (yellow card) 76'	Stadium: Anoeta; Referee: Ignacio Iglesias Villanueva

5 October 2014 7	Espanyol	2–0	Real Sociedad	Cornellà de Llobregat
19:00 CEST	Vázquez 7'; Cañas (yellow card) 28'; López (yellow card) 33'; Fuentes (yellow card) 47'; Sánchez (yellow card) 65'; Álvaro (yellow card) 69'; Colotto (yellow card) 86'; Stuani 90+2'	Summary	Gaztañaga (yellow card) 51'; González (yellow card) 56'	Stadium: Cornellà-El Prat; Attendance: 18,326; Referee: Mario Melero López

20 October 2014 8	Real Sociedad	1–2	Getafe	San Sebastián
20:45 CEST	Zaldúa (yellow card) 13'; Hervías 82'	Summary	Hinestroza (yellow card) 42'; Lacen (yellow card) 45+1'; Valera (yellow card) 77'; Yoda 90' 90+4'; Míchel (yellow card) 90+1'	Stadium: Anoeta; Attendance: 19,098; Referee: Pedro Pérez Montero

25 October 2014 9	Córdoba	1–1	Real Sociedad	Córdoba
22:00 CEST	Pinillos (yellow card) 80'; Ghilas (yellow card) 83'; Campabadal (yellow card) 86'; Xisco 87'	Report	I. Martínez 22'; Vela (yellow card) 56'; Granero (yellow card) 83'	Stadium: Nuevo Arcángel; Attendance: 15,712; Referee: Carlos del Cerro Grande

1 November 2014 10	Real Sociedad	0–1	Málaga	San Sebastián
22:00 CET	Berchiche (yellow card) 34'; Zurutuza (yellow card) 45'	Report	Samu (yellow card) 38'; Darder (yellow card) 43'; Weligton (yellow card) 56'; Amrabat (yellow card) 63'; Juanmi 72'; Recio (yellow card) 85'	Stadium: Anoeta Stadium; Attendance: 22,000; Referee: Santiago Jaime Latre

9 November 2014 11	Real Sociedad	2–1	Atlético Madrid	San Sebastián
21:00 CET	Vela 15', (yellow card) 23'; Berchiche (yellow card) 18'; Agirretxe 82'	Report	Mandžukić 10'; Suárez (yellow card) 13'; Turan (yellow card) 16'; Juanfran (yellow card) 17'; Siqueira (yellow card) 48' (yellow-red card) 50'; García (yellow card) 51'; Koke (yellow card) 80'; Gabi (yellow card) 81'	Stadium: Anoeta; Attendance: 22,768; Referee: Alfonso Álvarez Izquierdo

22 November 2014 12	Deportivo La Coruña	0–0	Real Sociedad	A Coruña
22:00 CET	Juanfran (yellow card) 33'; Medunjanin (yellow card) 37'; Lopo (yellow card) 90+1'	Report	Ansotegui (yellow card) 33'	Stadium: Riazor; Attendance: 18,521; Referee: Eduardo Prieto Iglesias

28 November 2014 13	Real Sociedad	3–0	Elche	San Sebastián
20:45 CET	Vela 3', 31', 53'; Ansotegui (yellow card) 5'; Canales (yellow card) 14'	Report	Adrián (yellow card) 28'; Rodrigues (yellow card) 62'; Rodríguez (yellow card) 76'; Cisma (yellow card) 82'	Stadium: Anoeta; Attendance: 17,000; Referee: Carlos Velasco Carballo

7 December 2014 14	Villarreal	4–0	Real Sociedad	Villarreal
19:00 CET	Vietto (yellow card) 41'; Jaume (yellow card) 48'; Bruno 63'; Cheryshev 73'; Gómez 80', 86'	Report	De la Bella (yellow card) 35'; I. Martínez (yellow card) 67'	Stadium: El Madrigal; Attendance: 16,000; Referee: Teixeira Vitienes

14 December 2014 15	Real Sociedad	1–1	Athletic Bilbao	San Sebastián
21:00 CET	Vela 3'	Report	San José (yellow card) 13'; Laporte (yellow card) 26' (yellow-red card) 80'; De Marcos 61'; Iturraspe (yellow card) 85'; Balenziaga (yellow card) 90+4'; Ibai (yellow card) 90+4'	Stadium: Anoeta; Referee: David Fernández Borbalán

20 December 2014 16	Levante	1–1	Real Sociedad	Valencia
18:00 CET	Karabelas (yellow card) 14'; Barral (yellow card) 42'; Navarro (yellow card) 86'; Ivanschitz 90+2'		I. Martínez (yellow card) 22'; Canales 48'; Prieto (yellow card) 74'; Finnbogason (yellow card) 75'; Rulli (yellow card) 85'; Bergara (yellow card) 90'	Stadium: Ciutat de València

4 January 2015 17	Real Sociedad	1–0	Barcelona	San Sebastián
21:00 CET	Alba 2' (o.g.)			Stadium: Anoeta

11 January 2015 18	Granada	1–1	Real Sociedad	Granada
19:00 CET	El-Arabi (yellow card) 27'; Babin (yellow card) 35'; Rico 79' (pen.)	Report	Vela (yellow card) 26', (goal) 36' (pen.); I. Martínez (yellow card) 70'	Stadium: Nuevo Los Cármenes; Attendance: 22,000; Referee: Juan Martínez Munuera

17 January 2015 19	Real Sociedad	0–1	Rayo Vallecano	San Sebastián
16:00 CET		Report	Manucho (yellow card) 65', (goal) 81'; Trashorras (yellow card) 74'; Quini (yellow card) 77'; Ba (yellow card) 87'	Stadium: Anoeta; Attendance: 21,542; Referee: Mario Melero López

24 January 2015 20	Real Sociedad	1–0	Eibar	San Sebastián
22:00 CET	Granero (yellow card) 6'; Prieto 55'; A. Elustondo (yellow card) 58'	Report	García (yellow card) 7'; Lillo (yellow card) 75'	Stadium: Anoeta; Attendance: 19,000; Referee: José González González

31 January 2015 21	Real Madrid	4–1	Real Sociedad	Madrid
16:00 CET	Rodríguez 3'; Illarramendi (yellow card) 31'; Ramos 37'; Benzema 52', 76'; Marcelo (yellow card) 70'; Khedira (yellow card) 88'	Report	A. Elustondo 1'; Berchiche (yellow card) 88'	Stadium: Santiago Bernabéu; Attendance: 73,000; Referee: Alfonso Álvarez Izquierdo

7 February 2015 22	Real Sociedad	1–1	Celta de Vigo	San Sebastián
22:00 CET	Agirretxe 8' (yellow card) 60'; González (yellow card) 12'; Granero (yellow card) 51'; Zaldúa (yellow card) 71'; Pardo (yellow card) 80'	Report	Fernández (yellow card) 53'; López (yellow card) 55'; Cabral (yellow card) 63'; Jonny (yellow card) 83'; Nolito 85'	Stadium: Anoeta; Attendance: 14,836; Referee: Santiago Jaime Latre

13 February 2015 23	Almería	2–2	Real Sociedad	Almería
20:45 CET	Verza 5' (pen.); Corona (yellow card) 30'; Hemed 40'; Vélez (yellow card) 46'; Thievy (yellow card) 69'; Dos Santos (yellow card) 73'; Zongo (yellow card) 85'	Report	Rulli (yellow card) 3'; Granero (yellow card) 18'; Agirretxe 27'; Canales 48'; Berchiche (yellow card) 82'; Ansotegi (yellow card) 84'	Stadium: Juegos Mediterráneos; Attendance: 13,600; Referee: Carlos Velasco Carballo

22 February 2015 24	Real Sociedad	4–3	Sevilla	San Sebastián
12:00 CET	De la Bella (yellow card) 12'; Agirretxe 16'; Prieto 48' (pen.), 90'; I. Martínez (yellow card) 77'; Arribas 82' (o.g.); Granero (yellow card) 88'; Rulli (yellow card) 90+2'	Report	Kolodziejczak 43'; Trémoulinas (yellow card) 47'; Iborra (yellow card) 48'; Bacca 67'; Gameiro 78' (pen.); Carriço (yellow card) 80'	Stadium: Anoeta; Attendance: 21,378; Referee: Fernando Teixeira Vitienes

1 March 2015 25	Valencia	2–0	Real Sociedad	Valencia
12:00 CET	Mustafi (yellow card) 45+2'; Pérez (yellow card) 45+2'; Piatti 53', 56'; De Paul (yellow card) 88'	Report	G. Elustondo (yellow card) 12'; A. Elustondo (yellow card) 39'; Berchiche (yellow card) 75'	Stadium: Mestalla; Attendance: 38,000; Referee: Xavier Estrada Fernández

8 March 2015 26	Real Sociedad	1–0	Espanyol	San Sebastián
17:00 CET	Canales 38'; Bergara (yellow card) 84'; Pardo (yellow card) 90+3'	Summary	Sánchez (yellow card) 50'; Moreno (yellow card) 77'; Colotto (yellow card) 89'	Stadium: Anoeta; Attendance: 23,329; Referee: Eduardo Prieto Iglesias

16 March 2015 27	Getafe	0–1	Real Sociedad	Getafe
20:45 CET		Summary	I. Martínez 66'	Stadium: Coliseum Alfonso Pérez

22 March 2015 28	Real Sociedad	3–1	Córdoba	San Sebastián
19:00 CET	Agirretxe 33'; Castro 75'; Finnbogason 90+2'	Summary	Florín 12'	Stadium: Anoeta

4 April 2015 29	Málaga	1–1	Real Sociedad	Málaga
22:00 CET	Recio 55'; Sánchez (yellow card) 65'; Castillejo (yellow card) 80'; Boka (yellow card) 90+2'; Weligton (yellow card) 90+2'	Report	Bergara (yellow card) 43'; I. Martínez (yellow card) 54'; Ansotegi (yellow card) 71'; Pardo 83', (yellow card) 90+4'; Prieto (yellow card) 87'	Stadium: La Rosaleda; Attendance: 22,000; Referee: Carlos del Cerro Grande

7 April 2015 30	Atlético Madrid	2–0	Real Sociedad	Madrid
20:00 CET	González 2' (o.g.); Griezmann 10'; Turan (yellow card) 83'	Report		Stadium: Vicente Calderón; Attendance: 42,500; Referee: Alberto Undiano Mallenco

12 April 2015 31	Real Sociedad	2–2	Deportivo La Coruña	San Sebastián
19:00 CET	Prieto 33' (pen.), (yellow card) 67'; Ansotegi (yellow card) 39'; Castro 57', (yellow card) 62'; Zaldúa (yellow card) 82'	Report	Fabricio (yellow card) 33'; Borges (yellow card) 35'; Lucas 40'; Cavaleiro (yellow card) 71'; Toché 78'; Lopo (yellow card) 85'	Stadium: Anoeta; Attendance: 21,894; Referee: Pedro Pérez Montero

20 April 2015 32	Elche	1–0	Real Sociedad	Elche
20:45 CET	Jonathas 19'; Aarón (yellow card) 75'; Pašalić (yellow card) 79'; Rodríguez (yellow card) 83'	Report	Bergara (yellow card) 27'; Zaldúa (yellow card) 67'; Zurutuza (yellow card) 72'; Rulli (yellow card) 90+4'	Stadium: Martínez Valero; Attendance: 19,159; Referee: Eduardo Prieto Iglesias

25 April 2015 33	Real Sociedad	0–0	Villarreal	San Sebastián
22:00 CET	González (yellow card) 81'	Report	J. Dos Santos (yellow card) 45+1'; Ruiz (yellow card) 46'; Trigueros (yellow card) 58'; Juan Carlos (yellow card) 72'	Stadium: Anoeta; Attendance: 17,073; Referee: Jesús Gil Manzano

28 April 2015 34	Athletic Bilbao	1–1	Real Sociedad	Bilbao
22:00 CET	Balenziaga (yellow card) 12'; Aduriz 52' (pen.); Laporte (yellow card) 79'	Report	González (red card) 50'; De la Bella (yellow card) 51', (goal) 60'; Pardo (yellow card) 85'	Stadium: San Mamés; Attendance: 42,322; Referee: Juan Martínez Munuera

1 May 2015 35	Real Sociedad	3–0	Levante	San Sebastián
20:45 CET	Finnbogason 13', (yellow card) 48'; Bergara 51'; Berchiche (yellow card) 61'; Vela 86'	Report	Morales (yellow card) 12'; Simão Mate (yellow card) 40'; Camarasa (yellow card) 58'	Stadium: Anoeta; Attendance: 18,821; Referee: Carlos del Cerro Grande

9 May 2015 36	Barcelona	2–0	Real Sociedad	Barcelona
18:00 CET	Neymar 51'; Mascherano (yellow card) 63'; Pedro 85'	Report	Granero (yellow card) 26'; De la Bella (yellow card) 27'; Bergara (yellow card) 29'; Rulli (yellow card) 62'; Pardo (yellow card) 76'	Stadium: Camp Nou; Attendance: 86,047; Referee: Ignacio Iglesias Villanueva

17 May 2015 37	Real Sociedad	0–3	Granada	San Sebastián
19:00 CET	Prieto (yellow card) 7'; Castro (yellow card) 85'	Report	Bangoura (yellow card) 26'; El-Arabi 74'; Robert 79'; Márquez (yellow card) 85'; Rochina 88'	Stadium: Anoeta; Attendance: 20,644; Referee: Xavier Estrada Fernández

23 May 2015 38	Rayo Vallecano	2–4	Real Sociedad	Madrid
18:30 CET	Morcillo (yellow card) 17', (goal) 64'; Bueno 42'	Report	Vela 19'; Castro 21'; González (yellow card) 57'; Agirretxe 73'; G. Elustondo 75'	Stadium: Campo de Vallecas; Attendance: 9,593; Referee: Fernando Teixeira Vitienes

=== UEFA Europa League ===
==== Third qualifying round ====
31 July 2014	Real Sociedad	2–0	Aberdeen	San Sebastián
20:30 CET	Zurutuza 53'; Canales 68'	Report		Stadium: Anoeta; Attendance: 23,147; Referee: Bastian Dankert (Germany)

7 August 2014	Aberdeen	2–3 (5–2 agg.)	Real Sociedad	Aberdeen
20:45 CET	Pawlett 44'; Reynolds 57'	Report	Prieto 28', 86' (pen.); Bergara 90+1'	Stadium: Pittodrie Stadium; Referee: Eitan Shemeulevitch (Israel)

==== Play-off round ====
21 August 2014	Real Sociedad	1–0	Krasnodar	San Sebastián
20:30	Prieto 71'	Report		Stadium: Anoeta; Attendance: 22,245; Referee: Ruddy Buquet (France)

28 August 2014	Krasnodar	3–0 (3–1 agg.)	Real Sociedad	Krasnodar
18:00	Joãozinho 71' (pen.); Pereyra 88'; Ari 90'	Report		Stadium: Kuban Stadium; Attendance: 26,572; Referee: Szymon Marciniak (Poland)

=== Copa del Rey ===
==== Round of 32 ====
4 December 2014 First leg	Oviedo	0–0	Real Sociedad	Oviedo
20:00 CET		Report		Stadium: Carlos Tartiere; Attendance: 9,028; Referee: Teixeira Vitienes

17 December 2014 Second leg	Real Sociedad	2–0 (2–0 agg.)	Oviedo	San Sebastián
22:00 CET	Finnbogason 28', 61'	Report	Generelo (yellow card) 90+1'	Stadium: Anoeta; Attendance: 2,500; Referee: Alberto Undiano Mallenco

==== Round of 16 ====
7 January 2015 First leg	Villarreal	1–0	Real Sociedad	Villarreal
20:00 CET	Costa (yellow card) 14'; Cheryshev 72'	Report	Berchiche (yellow card) 76'; Canales (yellow card) 85'	Stadium: El Madrigal; Attendance: 12,000; Referee: Teixeira Vitienes

14 January 2015 Second leg	Real Sociedad	2–2 (2–3 agg.)	Villarreal	San Sebastián
20:00	Pardo (yellow card) 14'; Vela 45', (yellow card) 56'; I. Martínez (yellow card) 50'; Berchiche (yellow card) 50'; Granero 74'; Moyes (red card) 81'	Report	Musacchio (yellow card) 20' (yellow-red card) 82'; Gerard 26', (yellow card) 70'; Matías Nahuel (yellow card) 62'; G. Dos Santos (yellow card) 70', (goal) 72'; Cheryshev (yellow card) 89'	Stadium: Anoeta Stadium; Attendance: 17,000; Referee: Carlos Velasco Carballo

== Statistics ==
=== Appearances and goals ===
No.	Pos	Nat	Player	Total		La Liga		Copa del Rey		UEFA Europa League	
No.	Pos	Nat	Player	Apps	Goals	Apps	Goals	Apps	Goals	Apps	Goals
Goalkeepers
1	GK	(Argentina) ARG	Gerónimo Rulli	26	0	22	0	3	0	1	0
13	GK	(Spain) ESP	Eñaut Zubikarai	21	0	16	0	1	0	3+1	0
Defenders
2	DF	(Spain) ESP	Carlos Martínez	16	0	13+2	0	1	0	0	0
3	DF	(Spain) ESP	Mikel González	18	0	14+2	0	2	0	0	0
6	DF	(Spain) ESP	Iñigo Martínez	41	3	34	3	3	0	4	0
15	DF	(Spain) ESP	Ion Ansotegi	21	0	19	0	2	0	0	0
19	DF	(Spain) ESP	Yuri Berchiche	25	0	17+4	0	4	0	0	0
20	DF	(Spain) ESP	Joseba Zaldúa	28	0	21+2	0	1	0	4	0
22	DF	(Spain) ESP	Dani Estrada	1	0	0	0	0+1	0	0	0
24	DF	(Spain) ESP	Alberto de la Bella	27	1	21+2	1	0	0	4	0
34	DF	(Spain) ESP	Aritz Elustondo	5	1	4	1	1	0	0	0
Midfielders
4	MF	(Spain) ESP	Gorka Elustondo	26	1	12+7	1	2+1	0	4	0
5	MF	(Spain) ESP	Markel Bergara	35	2	24+6	1	1	0	4	1
8	MF	(Spain) ESP	Esteban Granero	39	1	29+4	0	2	1	0+4	0
10	MF	(Spain) ESP	Xabi Prieto	42	7	33+2	4	2+1	0	4	3
14	MF	(Spain) ESP	Rubén Pardo	36	1	21+7	1	4	0	4	0
16	MF	(Spain) ESP	Sergio Canales	43	5	31+5	4	2+1	0	2+2	1
17	MF	(France) FRA	David Zurutuza	22	3	12+4	2	2	0	3+1	1
18	MF	(Uruguay) URU	Chory Castro	37	4	22+10	4	1+1	0	3	0
36	MF	(Spain) ESP	Eneko Capilla	2	0	0+2	0	0	0	0	0
Forwards
7	FW	(Iceland) ISL	Alfreð Finnbogason	31	4	6+19	2	3+1	2	2	0
9	FW	(Spain) ESP	Imanol Agirretxe	37	7	21+10	7	1+1	0	2+2	0
11	FW	(Mexico) MEX	Carlos Vela	32	10	23+6	9	1	1	0+2	0
32	FW	(Spain) ESP	Iker Hernández	2	0	0+1	0	0+1	0	0	0
35	FW	(Spain) ESP	Alain Oyarzun	2	0	0	0	0+2	0	0	0
Players transferred out during the season
21	DF	(Algeria) ALG	Liassine Cadamuro	0	0	0	0	0	0	0	0
23	MF	(Spain) ESP	Jon Gaztañaga	5	0	1+2	0	2	0	0	0
29	MF	(Spain) ESP	Pablo Hervías	18	1	2+13	1	3	0	0	0
30	DF	(Peru) PER	Alexander Callens	1	0	0	0	0+1	0	0	0

Last updated: 30 May 2015
Source: BDFutbol
