= Elustondo =

Elustondo is a surname. Notable people with the surname include:

- Aritz Elustondo (born 1994), Spanish football defender
- Gorka Elustondo (born 1987), Spanish football defender
- Jagoba Arrasate Elustondo (born 1978), Spanish football defender
- Mikel Zalbide Elustondo (born 1951), Spanish linguist
