= Sergio Canales =

Spanish footballer (born 1991)

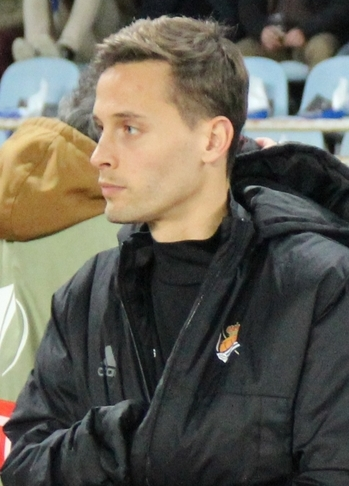
- Canales with Real Sociedad in 2018

Personal information
- Full name: Sergio Canales Madrazo
- Date of birth: 16 February 1991 (age 35)
- Place of birth: Santander, Spain
- Height: 1.76 m (5 ft 9 in)
- Position: Attacking midfielder

Team information
- Current team: Racing Santander
- Number: 20

Youth career
- 1995–2001: CD San Agustín
- 2001–2008: Racing Santander

Senior career*
Years	Team	Apps	(Gls)
2008–2010	Racing B	28	(4)
2008–2010	Racing Santander	32	(6)
2010–2012	Real Madrid	10	(0)
2011–2012	→ Valencia (loan)	11	(1)
2012–2014	Valencia	32	(2)
2014–2018	Real Sociedad	135	(10)
2018–2023	Betis	164	(30)
2023–2026	Monterrey	95	(41)
2026–	Racing Santander	13	(2)

International career
2007	Spain U16	3	(1)
2007–2008	Spain U17	11	(1)
2009	Spain U18	1	(1)
2009–2010	Spain U19	10	(2)
2011	Spain U20	4	(2)
2010–2013	Spain U21	10	(6)
2019–2023	Spain	11	(1)
Medal record
Men's football
Representing Spain
UEFA Nations League
Winner	2023 Netherlands
UEFA European Under-17 Championship
Winner	2008 Turkey
- * Club domestic league appearances and goals as of 18:52, 22 November 2026 (UTC)

Sergio Canales Madrazo (Spanish pronunciation: [ˈseɾxjo kaˈnales maˈðɾaθo]; born 16 February 1991) is a Spanish professional footballer who plays as an attacking midfielder for La Liga club Racing de Santander.

After starting out at Racing de Santander, he signed as a 19-year-old with Real Madrid for €4.5 million, but failed to reproduce his form at the latter club and left after only one season. He went on to represent, always in La Liga, Valencia, Real Sociedad and Betis, totalling 384 games and 49 goals across 15 seasons and winning the Copa del Rey once with Real Madrid and Betis.

Canales earned 39 caps for Spain at youth level, winning the 2013 European Championship with the under-21 team. He made his debut for the senior squad in 2019.

== Club career ==
=== Racing Santander ===
Born in Santander, Cantabria, Canales was a product of hometown Racing de Santander's youth ranks. In 2006, 50% of his playing rights were bought by Deportivo de La Coruña as part of the deal that saw Pedro Munitis return to Racing with Dudu Aouate and Antonio Tomás moving in the opposite direction.

Canales made his first-team debut on 18 September 2008, playing in a 2008–09 UEFA Cup home tie against FC Honka of Finland, 1–0 win. Roughly two weeks later he first appeared in La Liga, with the same result happening at CA Osasuna.

Having gradually received more playing time with the main squad, Canales scored twice against RCD Espanyol in a 4–0 away win on 6 December 2009, and repeated the feat at Sevilla FC on 9 January 2010 (2–1 at the Ramón Sánchez Pizjuán Stadium), receiving Player of the match honors in the latter game. The following week, as Racing drew at home to Real Valladolid 1–1, he also found the net, and eventually finished his first full season with six goals and four assists to help his team narrowly avoid relegation.

=== Real Madrid ===
On 12 February 2010, Real Madrid announced the signing of Canales on a six-year deal for a fee believed to be around €4.5 million plus incentives. He made his debut on 4 August, scoring a goal in a 3–2 friendly win over Club América. His first league appearance came on 29 August, in a 0–0 draw against RCD Mallorca.

Canales totalled 518 minutes of action in his only year with the club, which included three appearances in the victorious run in the Copa del Rey.

=== Valencia ===
On 4 August 2011, Valencia announced Canales would join the club on a two-year loan. After that time, they retained the option of purchasing the player whilst Real Madrid had the possibility of recalling him during that timeframe.

Canales scored his first goal for his new side on 1 October, the game's only in a home fixture against Granada CF. Late into the month, he had to be stretchered off during a league home match against Athletic Bilbao and, the following day, he was diagnosed with a torn cruciate ligament, being sidelined for six months.

On 26 April 2012, in only his fifth appearance since returning, against Atlético Madrid in the Europa League semi-finals' second leg, Canales relapsed from his injury early into the second half of an eventual 0–1 home loss (5–2 aggregate defeat), going on to miss a further six months of action.

On 19 July 2012, Canales moved permanently to Valencia for €7.5 million and five years, alongside Madrid teammate Fernando Gago. The latter also reserved an option to buy back the player during the next two seasons.

=== Real Sociedad ===
Canales was deemed surplus to requirements after the arrival of new Valencia coach Juan Antonio Pizzi, in December 2013. In late January of the following year, he signed for four and a half years and €3.5 million with fellow top-division side Real Sociedad.

Canales scored four goals from 36 appearances in his first full season, as the Txuriurdin finished in 12th position. On 30 December 2015, however, during the first half of a match at former club Real Madrid, he suffered another serious knee injury, now in the left leg.

On 24 May 2018, Real Sociedad confirmed that Canales would be leaving the Anoeta Stadium on 30 June.

=== Betis ===
On 3 July 2018, free agent Canales signed a four-year contract with Real Betis. In the 2020–21 campaign, he scored a career-best eight goals.

=== Monterrey ===
Canales moved abroad for the first time in July 2023, with the 32-year-old agreeing to a three-year deal at Liga MX club C.F. Monterrey. On 3 September, he scored twice in the 2–1 away win over C.D. Guadalajara.

Canales left in April 2026 after his contract expired.

=== Return to Racing ===
On 22 June 2026, Canales returned to his first club Racing, recently returned to the top tier, 16 years after leaving.

== International career ==
In 2008, Canales helped Spain's under-17 team win the UEFA European Championship in Turkey. At age 19 he made his under-21 debut, scoring twice in his first two games.

Subsequently, Canales was named in the squad for the 2009 European Under-19 Championship. The following year, in the same category, he represented the nation at the European Championships, reaching the final and scoring one goal in the semi-finals, a 3–1 win over England.

Canales was selected to the 2011 FIFA U-20 World Cup in Colombia, playing four out of five games for the national team (three starts) in an eventual penalty shootout quarter-final exit. He featured regularly in the 2013 European Championship Under-21 qualification where he netted three times, including a brace against Georgia; despite missing the playoff game with Denmark he was named in the squad for the finals in Israel, but withdrew from the tournament after picking an injury in the first group match against Russia– Spain went on to win the trophy.

On 15 March 2019, Canales was called up by full side manager Luis Enrique for two UEFA Euro 2020 qualifying matches against Norway and Malta. He made his debut eight days later, as a 74th-minute substitute for Dani Ceballos in the 2–1 victory over the former in Valencia.

Canales scored his first goal on 11 November 2020, opening the 1–1 friendly draw with the Netherlands in Amsterdam.

== Personal life ==
Canales' second cousin, Borja Docal, was also a footballer.

== Career statistics ==
=== Club ===
As of match played 22 November 2026

Appearances and goals by club, season and competition
Club	Season	League			National cup (Note: Includes Copa del Rey)		Continental		Other		Total	
Club	Season	Division	Apps	Goals	Apps	Goals	Apps	Goals	Apps	Goals	Apps	Goals
Racing Santander	2008–09	La Liga	6	0	1	0	1 (Note: Appearances in UEFA Europa League)	0	—		8	0
Racing Santander	2009–10	La Liga	26	6	5	1	—		—		31	7
Racing Santander	Total		32	6	6	1	1	0	—		39	7
Real Madrid	2010–11	La Liga	10	0	3	0	2 (Note: Appearances in UEFA Champions League)	0	—		15	0
Valencia (loan)	2011–12	La Liga	11	1	0	0	5 (Note: Three appearances in UEFA Champions League, two appearances in UEFA Europa League)	0	—		16	1
Valencia	2012–13	La Liga	13	2	1	0	1	0	—		15	2
Valencia	2013–14	La Liga	19	0	3	0	5	2	—		27	2
Valencia	Valencia total		43	3	4	0	11	2	—		58	5
Real Sociedad	2013–14	La Liga	16	2	2	0	—		—		18	2
Real Sociedad	2014–15	La Liga	36	4	3	0	4	1	—		43	5
Real Sociedad	2015–16	La Liga	16	0	2	1	0	0	—		18	1
Real Sociedad	2016–17	La Liga	31	0	6	0	0	0	—		37	0
Real Sociedad	2017–18	La Liga	36	4	2	1	7	0	—		45	5
Real Sociedad	Total		135	10	15	2	11	1	—		161	13
Betis	2018–19	La Liga	32	7	8	1	6	1	—		46	9
Betis	2019–20	La Liga	36	6	1	0	—		—		37	6
Betis	2020–21	La Liga	31	8	3	2	—		—		34	10
Betis	2021–22	La Liga	34	5	6	2	8	1	—		48	8
Betis	2022–23	La Liga	31	4	2	0	8	2	1 (Note: Appearance in Supercopa de España)	0	42	6
Betis	Total		164	30	20	5	22	4	1	0	207	39
Monterrey	2023–24	Liga MX	25	11	—		7 (Note: Appearances in CONCACAF Champions Cup)	0	5 (Note: Appearances in Leagues Cup)	2	37	13
Monterrey	2024–25	Liga MX	39	17	—		3	1	4 (Note: One appearance in Leagues Cup, three appearances in FIFA Club World Cup)	0	46	18
Monterrey	2025–26	Liga MX	31	13	—		1	0	3	2	35	15
Monterrey	Total		95	41	—		11	1	12	4	118	46
Racing Santander	2026–27	La Liga	13	2	0	0	—		—		13	2
Career total			492	92	48	8	58	8	13	4	611	112

=== International ===
Appearances and goals by national team and year
National team	Year	Apps	Goals
Spain	2019	2	0
Spain	2020	6	1
Spain	2021	2	0
Spain	2023	1	0
Total		11	1

Spain score listed first, score column indicates score after each Canales goal.

List of international goals scored by Sergio Canales
No.	Date	Venue	Cap	Opponent	Score	Result	Competition
1	11 November 2020	Johan Cruyff Arena, Amsterdam, Netherlands	6	Netherlands	1–0	1–1	Friendly

== Honours ==
Real Madrid

- Copa del Rey: 2010–11

Betis

- Copa del Rey: 2021–22

Spain U17

- UEFA European Under-17 Championship: 2008

Spain U19

- UEFA European Under-19 Championship runner-up: 2010

Spain U21

- UEFA European Under-21 Championship: 2013

Spain

- UEFA Nations League: 2022–23

Individual

- UEFA La Liga Team of The Season: 2018–19
- La Liga Team of the Season: 2021–22
- Liga MX Best XI: Apertura 2024, Apertura 2025
- Liga MX All-Star: 2024, 2025
