= Eñaut Zubikarai =

Spanish footballer (born 1984)

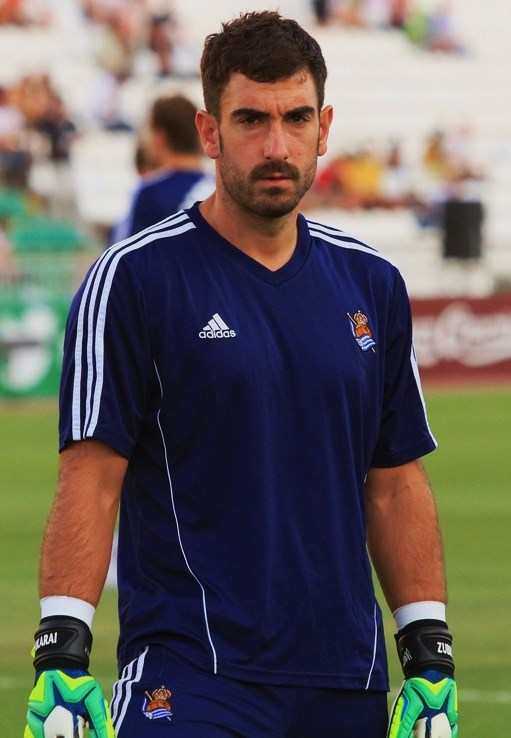
- Zubikarai with Real Sociedad in 2014

Personal information
- Full name: Eñaut Zubikarai Goñi
- Date of birth: 26 February 1984 (age 42)
- Place of birth: Ondarroa, Spain
- Height: 1.85 m (6 ft 1 in)
- Position: Goalkeeper

Youth career
- Aurrerá

Senior career*
Years	Team	Apps	(Gls)
2003–2008	Real Sociedad B	71	(0)
2005–2006	→ Eibar (loan)	1	(0)
2008–2015	Real Sociedad	46	(0)
2016	Tondela	5	(0)
2016–2021	Auckland City	60	(0)
Total		183	(0)
- * Club domestic league appearances and goals

Eñaut Zubikarai Goñi (born 26 February 1984) is a Spanish former professional footballer who played as a goalkeeper, currently goalkeeping coach of New Zealand club Auckland City FC.

== Club career ==
=== Real Sociedad ===
Born in Ondarroa, Biscay, Zubikarai joined Real Sociedad in 2003 at age 19, being assigned to the B team in the Segunda División B. For the 2005–06 season he was loaned to Basque neighbours SD Eibar, but appeared in only one game after suffering a shoulder injury (he suffered another after having returned to his parent club) and also suffered relegation from Segunda División, which triggered thoughts of an early retirement.

After Asier Riesgo moved to Recreativo de Huelva, Zubikarai was definitely promoted to the main squad but, after the former returned from his loan, both battled for second-choice status during the 2009–10 campaign. The latter contributed 12 matches as the Txuriurdin returned to La Liga after a three-year absence.

Zubikarai made his debut in the top flight on 10 April 2012 at the age of 28, in a 1–1 home draw against Real Betis. He continued to act as understudy to Claudio Bravo for the duration of his spell, but was Real Sociedad's goalkeeper in the Copa del Rey, notably helping to a semi-final run in 2013–14.

After the Chilean's departure to FC Barcelona in summer 2014, Zubikarai became the starter. However, shortly after conceding four goals in an away fixture against Villarreal CF in December, he lost his position to Gerónimo Rulli.

Zubikarai was released by Real Sociedad on 30 June 2015, after the expiration of his contract. On 20 January of the following year, after several months without a club, he signed a five-month deal with C.D. Tondela from Portugal.

=== Auckland City ===
In September 2016, free agent Zubikarai joined Auckland City FC. As part of a stellar defence which saw the team only allow 12 goals during the 2017–18 season as they won the New Zealand Football Championship title, he went 1,404 minutes or 15 games without conceding a goal in all competitions, beginning in the 70th minute of a 1–1 home draw against Southern United FC on 13 January 2018 and ending in the 37th minute of a 2–2 draw to Team Wellington on 29 April in the semi-finals of the OFC Champions League. This exploit constituted the third-longest streak of its kind of all time – behind Mazarópi and Thabet El-Batal – as well as the longest of the 21st century, and of any European goalkeeper.

Zubikarai became head goalkeeper coach on 5 October 2020, following the retirement of incumbent Simone Naddi.

== Personal life ==
In the summer of 2011, Hércules CF was on the verge of signing Zubikarai on loan, but pulled out, officially on financial grounds. However, the club reportedly feared public reaction to the signing of a player whose father, Cándido, was affiliated with terrorist organisation ETA, and was sentenced to thirty years in 1989 for the murder of two civil guards.

== Career statistics ==
Appearances and goals by club, season and competition
Club	Season	League			National cup		Continental		Other		Total	
Club	Season	Division	Apps	Goals	Apps	Goals	Apps	Goals	Apps	Goals	Apps	Goals
Real Sociedad B	2003–04	Segunda División B	13	0	—		—		—		13	0
Real Sociedad B	2004–05	Segunda División B	28	0	—		—		—		28	0
Real Sociedad B	2006–07	Segunda División B	7	0	—		—		—		7	0
Real Sociedad B	2007–08	Segunda División B	23	0	—		—		—		23	0
Real Sociedad B	Total		71	0	—		—		—		71	0
Eibar (loan)	2005–06	Segunda División	1	0	0	0	—		—		1	0
Real Sociedad	2004–05	La Liga	0	0	0	0	—		—		0	0
Real Sociedad	2007–08	Segunda División	0	0	0	0	—		—		0	0
Real Sociedad	2008–09	Segunda División	9	0	2	0	—		—		11	0
Real Sociedad	2009–10	Segunda División	12	0	0	0	—		—		12	0
Real Sociedad	2010–11	La Liga	0	0	2	0	—		—		1	0
Real Sociedad	2011–12	La Liga	1	0	4	0	—		—		4	0
Real Sociedad	2012–13	La Liga	7	0	2	0	—		—		9	0
Real Sociedad	2013–14	La Liga	1	0	8	0	1	0	—		10	0
Real Sociedad	2014–15	La Liga	16	0	1	0	4	0	—		21	0
Real Sociedad	Total		46	0	19	0	5	0	—		70	0
Tondela	2015–16	Primeira Liga	5	0	—		—		—		5	0
Auckland City	2016–17	New Zealand Football Championship	19	0	—		7	0	1	0	27	0
Auckland City	2017–18	New Zealand Football Championship	20	0	—		6	0	1	0	27	0
Auckland City	2018–19	New Zealand Football Championship	17	0	—		4	0	—		21	0
Auckland City	2019–20	New Zealand Football Championship	4	0	—		—		—		4	0
Auckland City	2020–21	New Zealand Football Championship	0	0	—		—		—		0	0
Auckland City	Total		60	0	—		13	0	2	0	75	0
Career total			183	0	19	0	18	0	2	0	222	0

== Honours ==
Real Sociedad

- Segunda División: 2009–10

Auckland City

- OFC Champions League: 2017
