= Iñigo Martínez =

Spanish footballer (born 1991)

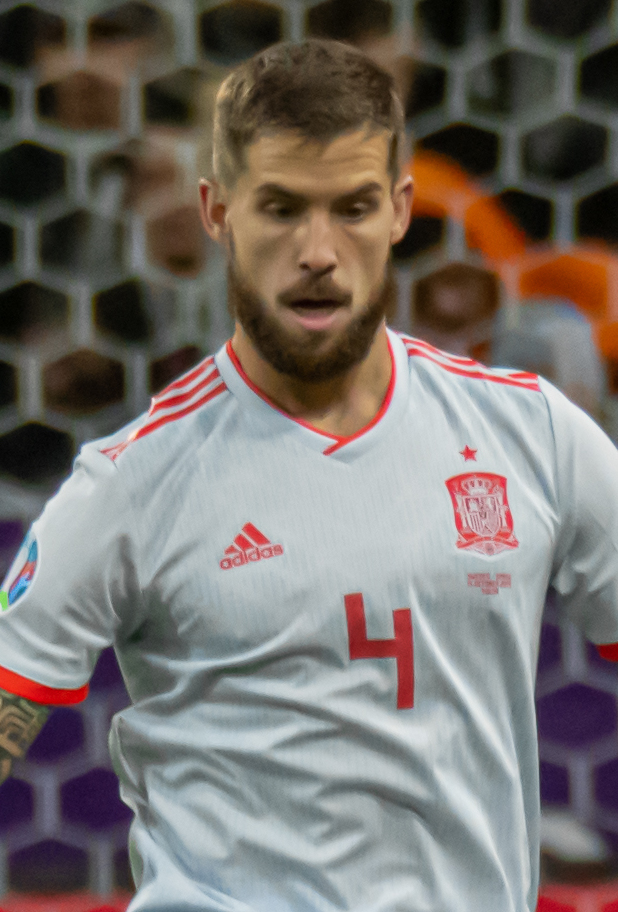
- Martínez with Spain in 2019

Personal information
- Full name: Iñigo Martínez Berridi
- Date of birth: 17 May 1991 (age 35)
- Place of birth: Ondarroa, Spain
- Height: 1.82 m (6 ft 0 in)
- Position: Centre-back

Team information
- Current team: Al-Nassr
- Number: 26

Youth career
- 2003–2006: Aurrerá
- 2006–2009: Real Sociedad

Senior career*
Years	Team	Apps	(Gls)
2009–2011	Real Sociedad B	54	(2)
2011–2018	Real Sociedad	205	(16)
2018–2023	Athletic Bilbao	152	(6)
2023–2025	Barcelona	48	(0)
2025–	Al-Nassr	41	(3)

International career
2011	Spain U20	1	(0)
2011–2013	Spain U21	15	(0)
2012	Spain U23	4	(0)
2013–2023	Spain	21	(1)
2011–2019	Basque Country	8	(0)
Medal record
Men's football
Representing Spain
UEFA Nations League
Runner-up	2021 Italy
UEFA European Under-21 Championship
Winner	2013 Israel	Team
- * Club domestic league appearances and goals as of 20:50, 20 November 2026 (UTC)

Iñigo Martínez Berridi (Basque: [iɲiɣo maɾtines̻ beriði]; Spanish: [ˈiɲiɣo maɾˈtineθ βeˈriði]; born 17 May 1991) is a Spanish professional footballer who plays as a centre-back for Saudi Pro League club Al-Nassr.

He spent most of his professional career with Real Sociedad, playing 238 matches (17 goals scored) in all competitions after making his debut at the age of 20. In January 2018, he signed with Athletic Bilbao for a fee of €32 million, with whom he won the 2020–21 Supercopa de España as well as reaching two Copa del Rey finals. He joined Barcelona in 2023, winning a domestic treble in the 2024–25 season.

Martínez won his first cap for Spain in 2013.

== Club career ==
=== Real Sociedad ===
Born in Ondarroa, Biscay, Martínez joined Real Sociedad's youth ranks from local Aurrerá Ondarroa. He made his senior debut in the 2009–10 season, helping the reserves to promote from Tercera División after one year out by contributing 23 games and one goal; he started out as a left-back.

On 27 August 2011, Martínez made his first-team – and La Liga – debut with the Basques, playing the full 90 minutes in a 2–1 away win against Sporting de Gijón. On 2 October he scored his first league goal, from inside his own half in an eventual 2–1 home loss to Athletic Bilbao in a derby.

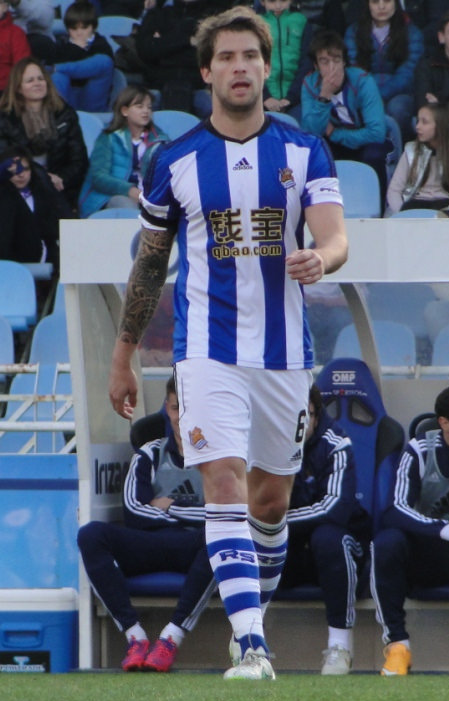
Martínez in action for Real Sociedad in 2015

Martínez scored his third league goal in the same fashion, in a 3–2 away victory over Real Betis on 27 November 2011 (in the 90th minute). He continued to be first choice in the following top-flight campaigns, notably helping the club to return to the UEFA Champions League after ten years in 2012–13 by netting four times in 34 matches.

On 26 April 2016, Martínez signed a new five-year deal.

=== Athletic Bilbao ===
On 30 January 2018, Martínez signed with Athletic Bilbao for €32 million (his contractual buyout clause amount and a record outlay for the buying club) on a deal until 2023; the fee was around half of the figure received the same day for the player he replaced in the Athletic squad, Aymeric Laporte, who had moved to Manchester City. He made his debut on 4 February, playing the entirety of a 2–0 domestic league defeat away to Girona.

During October 2018, Martínez conceded two penalties for foul challenges in two local derbies in the domestic league, both of which led to the opening goal and were awarded after Video Assistant Referee reviews – the first in a 3–1 home defeat to his old club Real Sociedad and the second in a 1–1 away draw against Eibar.

Martínez scored his first goal for Athletic (in his 85th competitive appearance) with a backheel flick in a home league fixture against Betis on 20 June 2020. He later also gave away a penalty, but the kick was missed and his proved to be the only goal of the match.

Under the spotlight playing against his former club Real Sociedad in the delayed 2020 Copa del Rey final, Martínez had a major role in proceedings: he came close to scoring with a long-range shot in the first half, appeared to have conceded a penalty for handball on the edge of the penalty area at the start of the second half – a VAR review ruled this to have been outside the box – then did concede a penalty for a foul on Portu ten minutes later. He was sent off by the referee, but another VAR check decided that he had not denied a goalscoring opportunity deliberately and the red card was downgraded to yellow. The penalty was scored, and Real took the trophy with a 1–0 scoreline. In the aftermath, he was seen taking time to offer congratulations to his many old teammates and was praised in the media for his sportsmanship.

Martínez announced his departure from the San Mamés Stadium at the end of the 2022–23 season. During his spell, he totalled 177 games and eight goals; in his last year, he dealt with several injury problems.

=== Barcelona ===
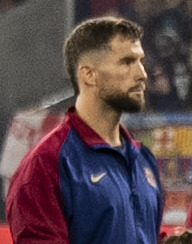
Martínez with Barcelona during the 2025 Copa del Rey final

On 5 July 2023, Barcelona announced the signing of Martínez on a free transfer with a two-year contract, which included a €400 million release clause. His early tenure was hindered by a foot injury that required surgery shortly after his arrival, delaying his registration and relegating him to fifth-choice behind Ronald Araújo, Andreas Christensen, Eric García and Jules Koundé. He made his competitive debut on 3 September, coming on for Christensen in the 91st minute of a 2–1 away win over Osasuna. His first start occurred 23 days later in the 2–2 away draw against Mallorca, and he finished his debut campaign with 25 appearances in all competitions.

Martínez became a regular starter at the beginning of 2024–25 under new head coach Hansi Flick, following injuries to Araújo and Christensen. He scored his first goal for both the club and in European competitions on 1 October 2024, in a 5–0 victory against Young Boys in the Champions League league phase.

On 13 March 2025, Martínez agreed to a new deal running until 30 June 2026. At the end of the season, he won a domestic treble of league, Copa del Rey and Supercopa de España; in the cup final against Real Madrid, he spent parts of the match as a left-back.

Martínez left Barcelona on 9 August 2025.

=== Al-Nassr ===
On 10 August 2025, the free agent Martínez joined Saudi Pro League side Al-Nassr on a one-year contract with an option for an additional year. He scored his first goal on 14 September, closing a 2–0 home win over Al-Kholood.

== International career ==
=== Spain ===
Martínez made his debut for the Spain under-21 team in 2011. In the following year, he was picked by manager Luis Milla for his squad that appeared in the 2012 Summer Olympics in London. In the first game against Japan he was sent off late into the first half for bringing down Kensuke Nagai, thus denying a clear goalscoring opportunity, in an eventual 1–0 loss.

Martínez made his first appearance with the full side on 14 August 2013, coming on as a second-half substitute for Sergio Ramos in a 2–0 friendly win over Ecuador. Between September 2018 and March 2021 he received eleven caps, including seven starting appearances; however, he was not included in Luis Enrique's 24-man squad for the UEFA Euro 2020 tournament (delayed for a year by the COVID-19 pandemic in Europe) when it was announced on 24 May, with the player stating that he was not totally happy with his physical situation having missed a number of club matches during the season and an agreement had been made between him, the national body and Athletic that he would not take part.

On 5 June 2022, Martínez scored his only goal, a last-minute header in the 2–2 away draw with the Czech Republic in the UEFA Nations League. He was called up again in March 2025 but withdrew from the squad due to a fitness issue, prompting an official complaint from Osasuna after he played for Barcelona in the next league fixture, as the Navarrese believed this to be in contravention of the regulations (the complaint was dismissed). Due to strong form, he was in consideration for the 2025 UEFA Nations League Finals, but reportedly asked national coach Luis de la Fuente not to select him due to family considerations and desire to rest in order to prolong his club career; additionally, there was some negativity towards the player among elements of the Spanish fanbase due to him having been seen waving the Estelada (flag of Catalan independence) in celebrations with Barcelona.

=== Basque Country ===
Martínez also featured in friendlies with the autonomous Basque Country team, his debut coming on 28 December 2011 in a 2–0 loss to Tunisia. In October 2018, shortly after asking to be released from a Spain squad due to physical problems, he controversially appeared for the regional selection against Venezuela.

Martínez played once more for them, against Panama on 30 May 2019.

== Style of play ==
Martínez was likened to compatriot Carles Puyol, known for his heading ability making him an aerial threat on set pieces, despite his modest stature of 1.82 m (5 ft 11 1/2 in). He was also known for his tackling and leadership qualities and ability to read the game, as well as competence with the ball at his feet.

Martínez was considered a specialist in the offside trap. At Barcelona under Flick he emerged as a pivotal figure with his leadership and experience, partnering youngster Pau Cubarsí; offensively, he contributed in attacking corners and free kicks due to his aerial prowess and timing.

== Career statistics ==
=== Club ===
As of match played 20 October 2026

Appearances and goals by club, season and competition
Club	Season	League			National cup (Note: Includes Copa del Rey, King's Cup)		Continental		Other		Total	
Club	Season	Division	Apps	Goals	Apps	Goals	Apps	Goals	Apps	Goals	Apps	Goals
Real Sociedad B	2009–10	Tercera División	23	1	—		—		—		23	1
Real Sociedad B	2010–11	Segunda División B	31	1	—		—		—		31	1
Real Sociedad B	Total		54	2	—		—		—		54	2
Real Sociedad	2011–12	La Liga	26	3	2	0	—		—		28	3
Real Sociedad	2012–13	La Liga	34	4	1	0	—		—		35	4
Real Sociedad	2013–14	La Liga	35	2	5	0	7 (Note: Appearances in UEFA Champions League)	0	—		47	2
Real Sociedad	2014–15	La Liga	34	2	3	0	4 (Note: Appearances in UEFA Europa League)	0	—		41	2
Real Sociedad	2015–16	La Liga	30	1	1	0	—		—		31	1
Real Sociedad	2016–17	La Liga	34	3	6	1	—		—		40	4
Real Sociedad	2017–18	La Liga	12	1	1	0	3	0	—		16	1
Real Sociedad	Total		205	16	19	1	14	0	—		238	17
Athletic Bilbao	2017–18	La Liga	16	0	—		—		—		16	0
Athletic Bilbao	2018–19	La Liga	33	0	2	0	—		—		35	0
Athletic Bilbao	2019–20	La Liga	33	1	8 (Note: Includes appearance in 2020 Copa del Rey final (played in 2021))	0	—		—		41	1
Athletic Bilbao	2020–21	La Liga	28	1	3	1	—		2 (Note: Appearances in Supercopa de España)	0	33	2
Athletic Bilbao	2021–22	La Liga	27	3	5	1	—		2	0	34	4
Athletic Bilbao	2022–23	La Liga	15	1	3	0	—		—		18	1
Athletic Bilbao	Total		152	6	21	2	—		4	0	177	8
Barcelona	2023–24	La Liga	20	0	1	0	4	0	0	0	25	0
Barcelona	2024–25	La Liga	28	0	5	1	11	2	2	0	46	3
Barcelona	Total		48	0	6	1	15	2	2	0	71	3
Al-Nassr	2025–26	Saudi Pro League	31	3	2	0	8 (Note: Appearances in AFC Champions League Two)	1	2 (Note: Appearances in Saudi Super Cup)	0	43	4
Al-Nassr	2026–27	Saudi Pro League	7	0	1	0	2 (Note: Appearances in AFC Champions League Elite)	0	0	0	10	0
Al-Nassr	Total		38	3	3	0	10	1	2	0	53	4
Career total			497	27	49	4	39	3	8	0	593	34

=== International ===
Appearances and goals by national team and year
National team	Year	Apps	Goals
Spain	2013	2	0
Spain	2016	2	0
Spain	2018	2	0
Spain	2019	5	0
Spain	2020	1	0
Spain	2021	5	0
Spain	2022	2	1
Spain	2023	2	0
Total		21	1

Spain score listed first, score column indicates score after each Martínez goal.

List of international goals scored by Iñigo Martínez
No.	Date	Venue	Cap	Opponent	Score	Result	Competition
1	5 June 2022	Sinobo Stadium, Prague, Czech Republic	18	Czech Republic	2–2	2–2	2022–23 UEFA Nations League A

== Honours ==
Athletic Bilbao

- Supercopa de España: 2021
- Copa del Rey runner-up: 2019–20, 2020–21

Barcelona

- La Liga: 2024–25
- Copa del Rey: 2024–25
- Supercopa de España: 2025

Al-Nassr

- Saudi Pro League: 2025–26
- AFC Champions League Two runner-up: 2025–26

Spain U21

- UEFA European Under-21 Championship: 2013

Spain

- UEFA Nations League runner-up: 2020–21

Individual

- La Liga Team of the Season: 2024–25
- The Athletic La Liga Team of the Season: 2024–25
- UEFA U-21 Championship Team of the Tournament: 2013

== See also ==
- List of footballers with 400 or more La Liga appearances
