= Ion Ansotegi =

Spanish footballer (born 1982)

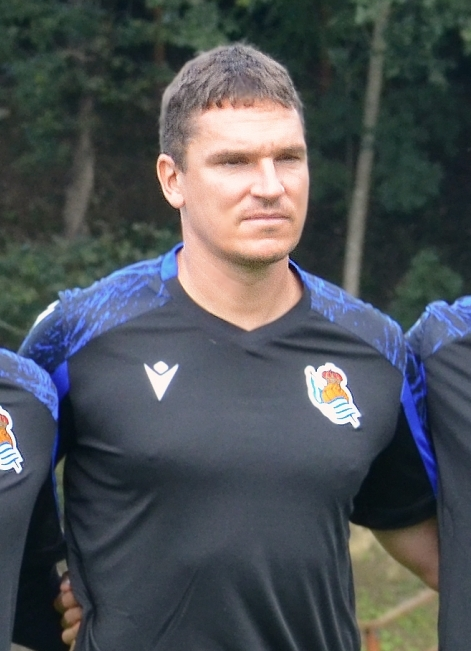
- Ansotegi with Real Sociedad in 2021

Personal information
- Full name: Ion Ansotegi Gorostola
- Date of birth: 13 July 1982 (age 44)
- Place of birth: Berriatua, Spain
- Height: 1.92 m (6 ft 4 in)
- Position: Centre-back

Team information
- Current team: Real Sociedad B (manager)

Youth career
- Eibar

Senior career*
Years	Team	Apps	(Gls)
2001–2002	Eibar B	44	(1)
2002–2003	Eibar	1	(0)
2002–2003	→ Barakaldo (loan)	17	(2)
2003–2006	Real Sociedad B	79	(3)
2006–2016	Real Sociedad	208	(11)
2016	Eibar	8	(0)
2016–2017	Mallorca	21	(2)
Total		378	(19)

International career
2010–2016	Basque Country	6	(0)

Managerial career
- 2018: Real Sociedad B (assistant)
- 2018–2025: Real Sociedad (assistant)
- 2025–: Real Sociedad B
- 2025: Real Sociedad (caretaker)
- * Club domestic league appearances and goals

Ion Ansotegi Gorostola (born 13 July 1982) is a Spanish former professional footballer who played as a central defender. He is currently manager of Segunda División club Real Sociedad B.

He spent most of his professional career with Real Sociedad after signing with the club at the age of 21, going on to appear in 226 competitive matches in 11 seasons. 124 of those came in La Liga (six goals scored).

== Playing career ==
Ansotegi was born in Berriatua, Basque Country. After starting his professional career with Eibar (with a loan to Barakaldo included), he moved to local giants Real Sociedad. He made his La Liga debut on 22 January 2006 in a 3–3 home draw against Athletic Bilbao in the Basque derby, and totalled 33 appearances over his first two top-flight seasons.

Ansotegi only missed two matches in 2009–10, being booked just six times in his 40 complete appearances – and adding four goals – as Real Sociedad returned to division one after a three-year absence. He featured in 32 games (all starts) the following campaign as the team retained their league status, but lost his importance in the squad following the January 2011 signing of Norwegian Vadim Demidov and the emergence of youth product Iñigo Martínez.

On 1 June 2015, aged 33, Ansotegi renewed his contract with Real Sociedad until 2016. On 1 February of the following year, after only two Copa del Rey appearances in the first part of the season, he cut ties with the Txuriurdin and moved back to his first club Eibar after agreeing to an initial six-month deal.

On 30 June 2016, Ansotegui signed a one-year contract with Mallorca in the Segunda División.

== Coaching career ==
In July 2017, having suffered relegation, the 35-year-old Ansotegi announced his retirement and immediate return to Real Sociedad as youth system coordinator. Roughly one year later, he joined Asier Garitano's staff as an individual coach, and remained there after the appointment of Imanol Alguacil.

On 29 May 2025, Ansotegi was named manager of Real B for the 2025–26 season, with another former teammate, Imanol Agirretxe, as his assistant. On 14 December, he was appointed at the first team on an interim basis following Sergio Francisco's dismissal. On his debut two days later, he oversaw a 2–1 away win over Eldense in the round of 32 of the national cup.

== Managerial statistics ==
As of 21 November 2026

Managerial record by team and tenure
Team	Nat	From	To	Record								Ref
Team	Nat	From	To	G	W	D	L	GF	GA	GD	Win %	Ref
Real Sociedad B	(Spain)	29 May 2025	Present	56	15	14	27	66	84	−18	26.79	
Real Sociedad (caretaker)	(Spain)	14 December 2025	20 December 2025	3	1	2	0	5	4	+1	33.33	
Total				59	16	16	27	70	88	−18	27.12	—

== Honours ==
Real Sociedad

- Segunda División: 2009–10
