= Javi Ros =

Spanish footballer

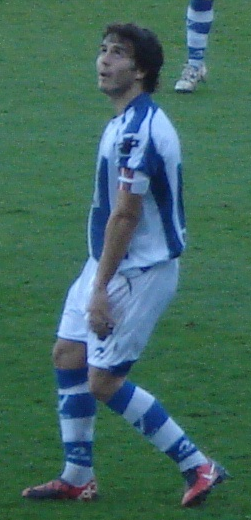
- Ros playing for Real Sociedad B in 2011

Personal information
- Full name: Javier Ros Añón
- Date of birth: 16 February 1990 (age 36)
- Place of birth: Pamplona, Spain
- Height: 1.73 m (5 ft 8 in)
- Position: Midfielder

Youth career
- 2002–2008: Real Sociedad

Senior career*
Years	Team	Apps	(Gls)
2008–2012	Real Sociedad B	120	(17)
2009–2014	Real Sociedad	20	(0)
2010	→ Eibar (loan)	16	(1)
2014–2016	Mallorca	36	(3)
2016–2022	Zaragoza	146	(14)
2022	→ Amorebieta (loan)	16	(1)
2022–2023	Badajoz	15	(2)
2023–2024	Rayo Majadahonda	18	(1)
Total		387	(39)
- * Club domestic league appearances and goals

Javier "Javi" Ros Añón (born 16 February 1990) is a Spanish former professional footballer who played as a midfielder.

He totalled 203 games and 18 goals in the Segunda División over nine seasons, representing mainly Real Zaragoza (160 competitive appearances). In La Liga, he played 15 matches with Real Sociedad.

== Club career ==
Born in Pamplona, Navarre, Ros played his youth football with Real Sociedad. Being signed at the age of only 12, he travelled regularly by taxi from Tudela to the club's training facilities, until eventually moving to a school in San Sebastián. He made his senior debut in the 2008–09 season, appearing for the reserves in the Segunda División B and suffering relegation.

Ros made his first appearance for the first team on 23 May 2009, coming on as a substitute for another youth graduate, Markel Bergara, in the early stages of a 1–0 away win against UD Salamanca. As the Basques had no chance to promote from Segunda División from that moment onwards, he started in the last four games of the campaign, renewing his contract until 2014 at its closure.

In late January 2010, Ros was loaned to neighbouring SD Eibar in the third tier. Subsequently, he returned to Real Sociedad, going on to be a notable midfield unit for the B's over two full seasons, still in division three.

On 19 August 2012, Ros made his first appearance in La Liga, playing 12 minutes in a 5–1 loss at FC Barcelona. He finished his first season with the main squad with seven competitive appearances, totalling 161 minutes of action.

Ros scored his first goal for Real Sociedad on 18 December 2013, opening the 4–0 home win over Algeciras CF in the round of 32 of the Copa del Rey (5–1 on aggregate). His second came on 16 January of the following year in the same competition, the only in the tie against Villarreal CF to qualify his team for the quarter-finals.

On 19 July 2014, Ros joined second-division club RCD Mallorca on a free transfer, signing a two-year contract. In January 2016, again as a free agent, he moved to Real Zaragoza of the same league.

A regular starter in his first seasons, Ros lost his starting spot midway through 2019–20, and suffered a knee injury which kept him out for six months in December 2020. On 30 January 2022, he was loaned to SD Amorebieta also of the second tier for six months.

Ros announced his retirement in May 2024, aged 34.

== Personal life ==
Ros was the fifth of seven brothers and sisters, Mikel being his twin. His older sibling Iñigo was also a footballer and a midfielder, spending the vast majority of his professional career in the third division and also representing Real Sociedad B and Eibar.
