= David Zurutuza =

Spanish footballer (born 1986)

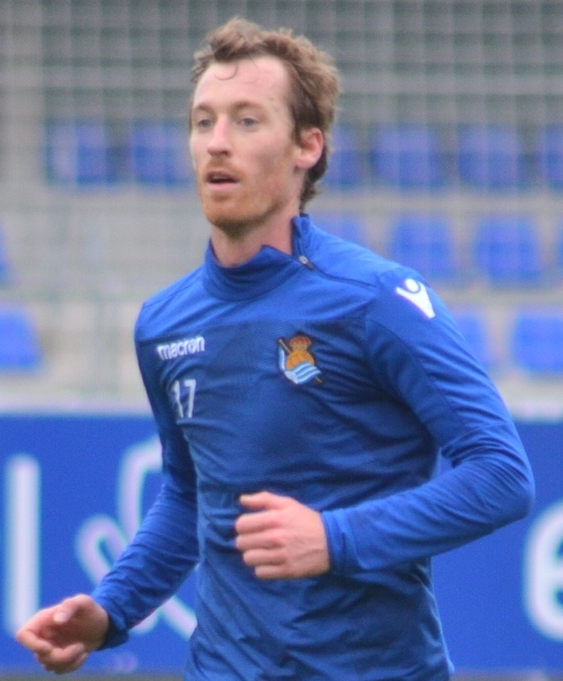
- Zurutuza with Real Sociedad in 2018

Personal information
- Full name: David Zurutuza Veillet
- Date of birth: 19 July 1986 (age 40)
- Place of birth: Rochefort, France
- Height: 1.86 m (6 ft 1 in)
- Position: Central midfielder

Youth career
- Lengokoak
- Decathlon Ondarroa
- Real Sociedad

Senior career*
Years	Team	Apps	(Gls)
2005–2009	Real Sociedad B	81	(5)
2007–2020	Real Sociedad	267	(20)
2007–2008	→ Eibar (loan)	24	(2)
Total		372	(27)

International career
2010–2018	Basque Country	5	(0)
- * Club domestic league appearances and goals

David Zurutuza Veillet (born 19 July 1986) is a Spanish former professional footballer who played as a central midfielder.

He spent his entire career contracted to Real Sociedad, with whom he made 303 competitive appearances over 12 seasons, and was also loaned to Eibar in the Segunda División.

== Early years ==
Zurutuza was born in Rochefort, Charente-Maritime, France, to a French mother and a Spanish father; the family returned to the latter's native Basque Country shortly after. He held both Spanish and French nationalities.

== Club career ==
Zurutuza joined Real Sociedad's youth system after starting his football career in Deba, Gipuzkoa. In the 2007–08 season, he was loaned to neighbours SD Eibar of Segunda División.

Zurutuza spent the following campaign with Real's B team in the Segunda División B, suffering relegation. On 23 November 2008 he made his debut for the main squad, playing ten minutes as a substitute for Necati Ateş in a 1–0 home win against SD Huesca.

In 2009–10, Zurutuza contributed four goals in 28 games as Real Sociedad returned to La Liga after a three-year absence. He continued to be first choice the next season, making his debut in the competition on 29 August 2010 in the 1–0 home victory over Villarreal CF and scoring his first goal on 28 November in a 3–1 away defeat of Sporting de Gijón; he only missed two league matches as the club managed to retain its status.

On 31 August 2014, in the second matchday of the new season, Zurutuza put on a Player of the match performance at home against Real Madrid, his brace helping Real Sociedad come from 2–0 behind to win 4–2. Five years later, on 14 September, he made his 300th appearance against Atlético Madrid.

Zurutuza retired from football in July 2020, at the age of 34.

== Career statistics ==
Appearances and goals by club, season and competition
Club	Season	League			Cup		Europe		Other		Total	
Club	Season	Division	Apps	Goals	Apps	Goals	Apps	Goals	Apps	Goals	Apps	Goals
Real Sociedad B	2005–06	Segunda División B	29	0	—		—		2 (Note: Appearances in Segunda División B play-offs)	0	31	0
Real Sociedad B	2006–07	Segunda División B	30	5	—		—		—		30	5
Real Sociedad B	2008–09	Segunda División B	22	0	—		—		—		22	0
Real Sociedad B	Total		81	5	0	0	0	0	2	0	83	5
Eibar (loan)	2007–08	Segunda División	24	2	1	0	—		—		25	2
Real Sociedad	2008–09	Segunda División	1	0	0	0	—		—		1	0
Real Sociedad	2009–10	Segunda División	28	4	0	0	—		—		28	4
Real Sociedad	2010–11	La Liga	36	2	0	0	—		—		36	2
Real Sociedad	2011–12	La Liga	33	3	4	0	—		—		33	3
Real Sociedad	2012–13	La Liga	21	2	1	0	—		—		25	2
Real Sociedad	2013–14	La Liga	28	1	5	0	5	0	—		34	1
Real Sociedad	2014–15	La Liga	16	2	2	0	4	1	—		25	3
Real Sociedad	2015–16	La Liga	16	1	0	0	—		—		18	1
Real Sociedad	2016–17	La Liga	31	3	6	0	—		—		37	3
Real Sociedad	2017–18	La Liga	31	0	1	0	5	1	—		37	1
Real Sociedad	2018–19	La Liga	21	2	3	0	—		—		24	2
Real Sociedad	2019–20	La Liga	5	0	0	0	—		—		5	0
Real Sociedad	Total		267	20	22	0	14	2	0	0	303	22
Career total			372	27	23	0	16	2			411	29

== Honours ==
Real Sociedad

- Segunda División: 2009–10
