= Diego Ifrán =

Uruguayan footballer (born 1987)

Personal information
- Full name: Diego Ifrán Sala
- Date of birth: 8 June 1987 (age 39)
- Place of birth: Cerro Chato, Uruguay
- Height: 1.74 m (5 ft 9 in)
- Position: Forward

Senior career*
Years	Team	Apps	(Gls)
2006–2008	Fénix	50	(19)
2008–2010	Danubio	45	(27)
2010–2015	Real Sociedad	52	(5)
2014	→ Deportivo La Coruña (loan)	11	(4)
2014–2015	→ Tenerife (loan)	28	(11)
2015–2016	Peñarol	19	(4)
2016	Sporting Cristal	21	(9)
- * Club domestic league appearances and goals

Diego Ifrán Sala (born 8 June 1987) is an Uruguayan former footballer who played as a forward.

== Club career ==
Born in Cerro Chato, Ifrán began his career with Fénix, where he played between 2006 and 2008. In the 2008 summer he moved to local giants Danubio.

On 13 August 2010 Ifrán signed a five-year deal with Real Sociedad, despite being sidelined due to a severe knee injury. He made his debut on 7 March of the following year, coming on as a late substitute in a 1–2 loss at Deportivo de La Coruña. His first goal came on 3 April, but in a 1–3 home loss against Hércules CF.

On 8 July 2013 Ifrán suffered an anterior cruciate ligament injury, being sidelined until January of the following year. On 19 March 2014 he was loaned to Deportivo until June.

On 1 August 2014 Ifrán moved to fellow Segunda División side CD Tenerife, also in a temporary deal. On 2 July 2015, he joined Peñarol.
