= Gorka Elustondo =

Spanish footballer

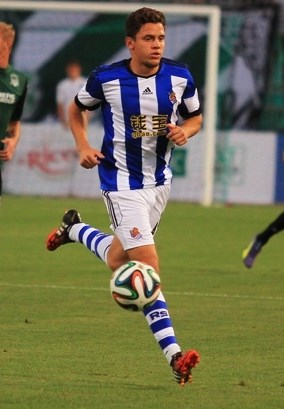
- Elustondo with Real Sociedad in 2014

Personal information
- Full name: Gorka Elustondo Urkola
- Date of birth: 18 March 1987 (age 39)
- Place of birth: Beasain, Spain
- Height: 1.82 m (6 ft 0 in)
- Positions: Centre-back; defensive midfielder

Youth career
- Aitzgorri
- 2004–2005: Real Sociedad

Senior career*
Years	Team	Apps	(Gls)
2005–2007	Real Sociedad B	64	(6)
2006–2015	Real Sociedad	144	(7)
2015–2017	Athletic Bilbao	13	(1)
2017	Atlético Nacional	8	(0)
2018–2019	Rayo Vallecano	19	(0)
Total		248	(14)

International career
2006	Spain U19	6	(0)
2007	Spain U20	2	(0)
- * Club domestic league appearances and goals

Gorka Elustondo Urkola (born 18 March 1987) is a Spanish former professional footballer who played as a central defender or a defensive midfielder.

He spent most of his career with Real Sociedad after making his debut in 2006, going on to appear in 167 competitive matches over six La Liga seasons (nine in total, eight goals). In July 2015, he signed with Athletic Bilbao.

== Club career ==
=== Real Sociedad ===
Elustondo was born in Beasain, Gipuzkoa. A product of Real Sociedad's prolific youth ranks, he made his La Liga debut on 20 December 2006 in a 0–0 away draw against RC Celta de Vigo. He made a further five first-team appearances in his first professional season, as the Basque club suffered top-tier relegation for the first time in 40 years.

In late October 2008, with Real in the Segunda División, in a home derby against Deportivo Alavés, Elustondo suffered a serious knee injury (which later relapsed), being rendered unavailable for the remainder of the campaign. He contributed 30 matches – 26 starts – and one goal in 2009–10, helping the Txuriurdin to return to the Spanish top flight after three years, as champions.

=== Athletic Bilbao ===
On 1 July 2015, after his contract with Real Sociedad expired, Elustondo signed a two-year deal with their neighbours, Athletic Bilbao. He made his competitive debut on 30 July, playing the second half of a 0–0 draw at Inter Baku PIK in the third qualifying round of the UEFA Europa League. His first league appearance occurred on 23 August, where he committed a penalty on Luis Suárez – later missed by Lionel Messi – in an eventual 1–0 home loss to FC Barcelona. Four days later, in the Europa League playoff round against MŠK Žilina, he scored through a long-range effort in the 23rd minute for the game's only goal and an away goals rule qualification.

On 2 June 2017, Elustondo confirmed that he would leave the San Mamés Stadium at the end of his contract.

=== Rayo Vallecano ===
On 17 January 2018, following a brief spell in Colombia with Atlético Nacional, the 30-year-old Elustondo returned to Spain after agreeing to an 18-month deal at Rayo Vallecano. He took part in 14 matches for the second-tier champions in his first season, and left in July 2019 after rejecting a new deal.

== International career ==
Elustondo was part of the Spain under-19 squad that won the 2006 UEFA European Championship in Poland.

== Honours ==
Real Sociedad

- Segunda División: 2009–10

Athletic Bilbao

- Supercopa de España: 2015

Rayo Vallecano

- Segunda División: 2017–18

Spain U19

- UEFA European Under-19 Championship: 2006
