= 2014–15 CA Osasuna season =

Osasuna
2014–15 season
- President: Luis Sabalza
- Head coach: Enrique Martín
- Stadium: El Sadar
- Segunda División: 18th
- Copa del Rey: Second round
Home colours	Away colours

The 2014–15 CA Osasuna season is the 94th season in the club's history.

== Season overview ==
=== July ===
On 3 July: The polish former striker Jan Urban makes his return to El Sadar as coach for his former club Osasuna. On 4 July, Argentine winger Emiliano Armenteros agreed to terminate the contract he signed two years prior and which was set to expire on 30 June 2015. He subsequently signed a two-year deal for Mexican Tuxtla Gutiérrez side Chiapas for a €7.5 million transfer fee. On 9 July, Jan Urban confirmed the official presentation of Osasuna pre-season matches on 14 July.

=== February ===
On 1 February, referee José María Sánchez Martínez suspended Osasuna's match with Real Zaragoza at El Sadar due to snow accumulation on the pitch.

== Current squad ==
As of 4 February 2015

No.	Nationality	Name	Age
Goalkeepers
1	(Spain)	Asier Riesgo	41
13	(Spain)	Roberto Santamaría	40
26	(Spain)	Jokin Ezkieta	28
Defenders
2	(Spain)	Javier Flaño	40
3	(Algeria)	Liassine Cadamuro-Bentaïba (on loan from Real Sociedad)	37
4	(Spain)	Miguel Flaño (vice-captain)	40
5	(Spain)	Ion Echaide	37
15	(Spain)	Oier	39
19	(Montenegro)	Nikola Vujadinović	38
22	(France)	Jordan Lotiès	40
28	(Spain)	David García	31
34	(Spain)	Íñigo de Frutos	30
Midfielders
6	(Iran)	Javad Nekounam (captain)	44
8	(Spain)	Mikel Merino	28
10	(Spain)	Roberto Torres	36
11	(Spain)	Sisi	39
23	(Cameroon)	Raoul Loé	36
30	(Spain)	Kike Barja	28
31	(Spain)	José García	28
35	(Spain)	Miguel Olavide	29
37	(Spain)	Yoel Sola	33
Forwards
7	(Spain)	Nino	44
9	(Spain)	Kenan Kodro	31
12	(Iran)	Karim Ansarifard	35
17	(Democratic Republic of the Congo)	Cedrick Mabwati (on loan from Columbus Crew)	33
33	(Spain)	Álex Berenguer	29

== Players and staff ==
=== Squad information ===
N	Pos.	Nat.	Name	Age	EU	Since	App	Goals	Ends	Transfer fee	Notes
1	GK	(Spain)	Riesgo	41	EU	2010	17	0	2016		
2	RB	(Spain)	J. Flaño	40	EU	2014	20	1	2015	Free	
3	CB	(Algeria)	Cadamuro	37	EU	2014	12	0	2015	Loan	Second nationality: France
4	CB	(Spain)	M. Flaño	40	EU	2004	23	1	2017	Youth system	
5	LB	(Spain)	Echaide	38	EU	2010	14	0	2015		
6	DM	(Iran)	Nekounam	44	Non-EU	2014	13	4	2016	Free	Previously played for the club from 2006 to 2012.
7	SS	(Spain)	Nino	44	EU	2011	24	9	2016		
8	AM	(Spain)	Merino	28	EU	2014	20	1	2018	Youth system	
9	CF	(Spain)	Kodro	31	EU	2014	23	1	2015	Youth system	Second nationality: Bosnia and Herzegovina
10	DM	(Spain)	Torres	36	EU	2012	22	2	2016	Youth system	
11	AM	(Spain)	Sisi	39	EU	2012	20	0	2015	Free	
12	CF	(Iran)	Ansarifard	35	Non-EU	2014	9	0	2016	Free	
13	GK	(Spain)	Santamaría	40	EU	2014	14	0	2016		
15	RB	(Spain)	Oier	39	EU	2007	94	2	2015	Youth system	Injured - LCA rupture
17	LW	(Democratic Republic of the Congo)	Cedrick	33	EU	2014	17	0	2015	Loan	Second nationality: Spain
19	CB	(Montenegro)	Vujadinović	38	EU	2014	10	0	2015	Free	
22	CB	(France)	Lotiès	40	EU	2013	37	0	2016	Free	Second nationality: Martinique
23	DM	(Cameroon)	Loé	36	EU	2012	70	4	2015	Youth system	Second nationality: France
26	GK	(Spain)	Ezkieta	28	EU	2014	0	0	2017	Youth system	
28	CB	(Spain)	D. García	31	EU	2014	12	0	2019	Youth system	
30	CM	(Spain)	Kike Barja	28	EU	2014	0	0	2015	Youth system	
31	CM	(Spain)	J. García	28	EU	2013	10	0	2015	Youth system	
33	CF	(Spain)	Berenguer	29	EU	2014	5	0		Youth system	
35	LM	(Spain)	Olavide	29	EU	2014	8	0		Youth system	
37	AM	(Spain)	Sola	33	EU	2014	0	0		Youth system	

- Last updated: 12 March 2015
- Source: Osasuna.es, Players in / out, Wikipedia players' article, ESPN (for appearances and goals) and d=386 footballdatabase.com (EU passport)

=== Transfer in ===
No.	Pos.	Nat.	Name	Age	EU	Moving from	Type	Transfer window	Ends	Transfer fee	Source
19	CB	(Montenegro)	Vujadinović	28	EU	Sturm Graz	Transfer	Autumn	2015	Free	
3	CB	(Algeria)	Cadamuro	27	EU	Real Sociedad	Loan	Summer	2015	Loan	
12	CF	(Iran)	Ansarifard	26	Non-EU	Tractor Sazi	Transfer	Summer	2016	Free	
17	LW	(Democratic Republic of the Congo)	Cedrick	23	EU	Real Betis	Loan	Summer	2015	Free	
6	DM	(Iran)	Nekounam	35	Non-EU	Al-Kuwait	Transfer	Summer	2016	Free	CA Osasuna
13	GK	(Spain)	Santamaría	31	EU	Ponferradina	Transfer	Summer	2016	Free	CA Osasuna
2	RB	(Spain)	J. Flaño	30	EU	Mirandés	Transfer	Summer	2015	Free	
3	LB	(Spain)	Echaide	27	EU	Hércules	Loan Return	Summer	2015	End of loan	
20	LW	(Belgium)	Lamah	27	Non-EU	Swansea City	Loan return	Summer	2014	End of loan	

Last updated: 13 January 2015
Total spending: ▼€0

=== Transfer out ===
No.	Pos.	Nat.	Name	Age	EU	Moving to	Type	Transfer window	Transfer fee	Source
14	CM	(Spain)	Mesa	24	EU	Racing de Ferrol	On loan	Winter	Loan	
8	RM	(Spain)	De las Cuevas	29	EU	Spezia	Transfer	Winter	Free	
27	CB	(Spain)	Unai	22	EU	Tudelano	On loan	Winter	Loan	
9	CF	(Spain)	Onwu	27	EU	Dinamo Tbilisi	Transfer	Winter	Free	
2	RB	(Spain)	Bertrán	33	EU	Recreativo Huelva	Transfer	Summer		
12	LB	(Spain)	Satrústegui	24	EU	Real Murcia	Transfer	Summer	Free	
5	DM	(Spain)	Lolo	30	EU	Real Zaragoza	Transfer	Summer	Free	
20	DM	(Chile)	Silva	29	Non-EU	Club Brugge	On loan	Summer	Loan	
24	RB	(Spain)	Damià	33	EU	Middlesbrough	Transfer	Summer	Free	
3	LB	(Spain)	J. Oriol	28	EU	Blackpool	Transfer	Summer	Free	
13	GK	(Spain)	Andrés	28	EU	Porto	Transfer	Summer	€2,100,000	
14	CB	(Spain)	Arribas	26	EU	Sevilla	Transfer	Summer	Free	
22	CM	(Spain)	Timor	26	EU	Real Valladolid	Transfer	Summer	Free	
10	DM	(Spain)	Puñal	39	EU	Retirement	End of Career	Summer	Retired	
9	LM	(Argentina)	Armenteros	29	Non-EU	Chiapas F.C.	Transfer	Summer	Free	
7	CF	(Paraguay)	Acuña	27	Non-EU	Club Olimpia	Transfer	Summer	Undisclosed	
19	CF	(Spain)	Riera	28	EU	Wigan Athletic	Transfer	Summer	€2,500,000	
20	CF	(Belgium)	Lamah	27	EU	Free agent	Free agent	Summer	Undisclosed	
17	LM	(Spain)	Lobato	26	EU	Free agent	Free agent	Summer	Undisclosed	

Last updated: 4 February 2015
Total Spending: ▲€4,600,000

=== Technical staff ===
Position	Staff
Head coach	José Mateo
Assistant coach	Alfredo Sánchez
Goalkeeper coach	Ricardo Sanzol
Trainer	César Sanjuán
Head of medical services	Patxi Cipríain Urmendia
Fitness coach	Josu Sesma
Physiotherapist	Pedro del Villar Adot; Javier Eransus
Osteopath	Damien Noirot
Delegate	Iñaki Ibáñez Sagarboy
Utillero	José Ramón Ozcoidi Ayerra

Last updated: 1 February 2014
Source: CA Osasuna Official website

== Kits ==
Supplier: Adidas
Sponsor(s): Lacturale

Home	Away	Goalkeeper Home	Goalkeeper Away

Last updated: 10 October 2014.
Source: CA Osasuna.es

== Friendlies ==
=== Pre-season ===
==== Legend ====
Win Draw Lose Postpone

==== Friendlies ====
29 July 2014 Pre-season	Brentford (England)	0–4	(Spain) Osasuna	Brentford, Greater London, England
19:45 BST		Report; Live TV: Osasuna TV	Onwu 52', 57'; Nino 74'; D. García 88'	Stadium: Griffin Park; Attendance: 5,234; Referee: Gavin Ward (England)

1 August 2014 Pre-season	Notts County (England)	2–0	(Spain) Osasuna	Nottingham, Nottinghamshire, England
19:30 BST	Jones 23'; Mullins 41'	Report		Stadium: Meadow Lane; Attendance: 1,114; Referee: Mark Brown (England)

6 August 2014 Pre-season	Osasuna (Spain)	3–1	(Spain) Atletico Bilbao	Pamplona, Navarre, Spain
20:00 CEST	J. Flaño 17'; De las Cuevas 21'; Loties 33'	Report	Iñigo 86'	Stadium: El Sadar; Attendance: 9,000; Referee: Ocón Arráiz (Spain)

9 August 2014 Pre-season	Osasuna (Spain)	1–0	(Spain) Huesca	Buñuel, Navarre, Spain
19:30 CEST	Onwu 18'	Report		Stadium: Buñuel; Attendance: 7,00; Referee: Carlos Domingo Pardales (Spain)

16 August 2014 Pre-season	Osasuna (Spain)	0–2	(Spain) Eibar	Tafalla, Navarre, Spain
19:00 CEST		Report	Albentosa 21'; Arruabarrena 37'	Stadium: San Francisco; Attendance: 1,100; Referee: Julio Leo Ollo (Spain)

17 August 2014 Pre-season	Burladés (Spain)	0–0 (a.e.t.) (3–5 p)	(Spain) Osasuna	Burlada, Navarre, Spain
18:00 CEST		Report		Stadium: Soto de Burlada; Attendance: 1,500; Referee: Eduardo Prieto Iglesias (Spain)

== Competitions ==
=== Overall ===
Competition	Started round	Current position / round	Final position / round	First match	Last match
Segunda División	—	19th		23 August 2014	6 June 2015
Copa del Rey	Second round	—	Second round	9 September 2014	9 September 2014

Updated to match played 15 March 2015
Source: Competitions

=== Liga Adelante ===
==== Legend ====
Win Draw Lose Postpone

==== Matches ====
Kickoff times are in CET and CEST

23 August 2014 1	Osasuna	2–0	Barcelona B	Pamplona
19:00	Nino 17', 81'; Loé (yellow card) 25'; Echaide (yellow card) 72'	Report; Live TV: LaLiga TV	Bagnack (yellow card) 61'; Gumbau (yellow card) 77'	Stadium: El Sadar; Attendance: 12,320; Referee: Dámaso Arcediano Monescillo

30 August 2014 2	Real Zaragoza	1–1	Osasuna	Zaragoza
19:00	Pedro 39'	Report; Live TV: Canal+1	De las Cuevas 90+3'	Stadium: La Romareda; Attendance: 2,500; Referee: Ricardo de Burgos Bengoetxea

6 September 2014 3	Osasuna	1–3	Alavés	Pamplona
18:15	Nekounam (67 p)	Report; Live TV: LaSexta	Juli (13 p); Vélez 49'; Migue 51'	Stadium: El Sadar; Attendance: 15,650; Referee: Daniel Trujillo Suárez

13 September 2014 4	Llagostera	0–0	Osasuna	Girona, Catalonia, Spain
20:30		Report; Live TV:		Stadium: Palamós Costa Brava; Attendance: 2,838; Referee: Pedro Sureda

21 September 2014 5	Osasuna	6–4	Mallorca	Pamplona, Navarre, Spain
12:00	De las Cuevas 39'; Loé 57'; Torres 60', 79'; Nino 75'; J. Flaño 85'	Report; Live TV: Canal+ 1	Asensio 21'; Šćepović 56', 57'; Abdón 87'	Stadium: El Sadar; Attendance: 12,920; Referee: Lesma López

27 September 2014 6	Lugo	4–3	Osasuna	Lugo
16:00	I. Díaz 3'; Pavón 38'; Manu 81'; B. Gómez 87'	Report; Live TV:	Nino 1', 67'; Loé 41'	Stadium: Anxo Carro; Attendance: 3,030; Referee: Oliver de La Fuente

4 October 2014 7	Osasuna	0–2	Racing Santander	Pamplona
18:15		Report; Live TV:	Juanpe 35', 76'	Stadium: El Sadar; Attendance: 13,513; Referee: Areces Franco

11 October 2014 8	Alcorcón	2–0	Osasuna	Alcorcón
18:15	Rodríguez 2', 23'	Report; Live TV:		Stadium: Santo Domingo; Attendance: 1,900; Referee: Sagués Oscoz

18 October 2014 9	Osasuna	3–2	Tenerife	Pamplona
20:00	Nekounam (46 p); Nino 77'; Kodro 90+2'	Report; Live TV: LaLigaTV	Sanz 36'; Vitolo (73 p)	Stadium: El Sadar; Attendance: 13,063; Referee: Valdés Aller

26 October 2014 10	Sporting de Gijón	2–0	Osasuna	Gijón
17:00	Lora 4'; Castro 90+3'	Report; Live TV:		Stadium: El Molinón; Attendance: 16,000; Referee: Rubén Eiriz

2 November 2014 11	Osasuna	3–2	Real Betis	Pamplona
12:00	Nekounam 47'; M. Flaño 59'; Onwu 86'	Report; Live TV:	Castro 12'; Rennella 32'	Stadium: El Sadar; Attendance: 15,000; Referee: Piñeiro Crespo

8 November 2014 12	Numancia	0–0	Osasuna	Sofia
18:15		Report; Live TV:		Stadium: Los Pajaritos; Attendance: 4,376; Referee: David Medié Jiménez

15 November 2014 13	Osasuna	0–1	Ponferradina	Pamplona
18:15		Report; Live TV:	Sobrino 26'	Stadium: El Sadar; Attendance: 12,457; Referee: López Amaya

23 November 2014 14	Albacete	2–0	Osasuna	Albacete
19:00	Cidoncha 42', 69'	Report; Live TV:		Stadium: Carlos Belmonte; Attendance: 9,000; Referee: González Fuertes

29 November 2014 15	Osasuna	0–0	Girona	Pamplona
18:00		Report; Live TV:		Stadium: El Sadar; Attendance: 11,526; Referee: Francisco Arias López

6 December 2014 16	Mirandés	1–0	Osasuna	Miranda de Ebro, Castile and León, Spain
18:00	Vela 66'	Report; Live TV:		Stadium: Anduva; Attendance: 3,000; Referee: Valentín Pizarro

14 December 2014 17	Osasuna	2–1	Real Valladolid	Pamplona
12:00	Nekounam 3'; Valiente 34' (o.g.)	Report; Live TV:	Óscar 15'	Stadium: El Sadar; Attendance: 12,000; Referee: José Luis Munuera Montero

21 December 2014 18	Las Palmas	1–2	Osasuna	Las Palmas
19:00	Momo 36'	Report; Live TV:	Nino 60'; Merino 68'	Stadium: Grab Canaria; Attendance: 20,032; Referee: Dámaso Arcediano Monescillo

3 January 2015 19	Osasuna	2–1	Leganés	Pamplona
18:15	De las Cuevas 63', 75'	Report; Live TV:	B. Lázaro 60'	Stadium: El Sadar; Attendance: 13,414; Referee: Daniel Ocón Arráiz

10 January 2015 20	Recreativo Huelva	1–1	Osasuna	Huelva
18:15	J. Vázquez (53 p)	Report; Live TV: LaSexta TV, LAOLA1 TV	Nino 63'	Stadium: Nuevo Colombino; Attendance: 8,947; Referee: Jesús Muñoz

17 January 2015 21	Osasuna	0–0	Sabadell	Pamplona
16:00		Report; Live TV: LaLiga TV, LAOLA1 TV, ETB1, Esport3		Stadium: El Sadar; Attendance: 13,092; Referee: Gorka Sagués

25 January 2015 22	Barcelona B	0–1	Osasuna	Barcelona
17:00		Report; Live TV:	Nino 27'	Stadium: Mini Estadi; Attendance: 5,791; Referee: Areces Franco

1 February 2015 P	Osasuna	P–P	Real Zaragoza	Pamplona
12:00		Report; Live TV:		Stadium: El Sadar; Referee: José María Sánchez Martínez
Note: Postsponed: Due to weather conditions

7 February 2015 P	Alavés	P–P	Osasuna	Vitoria-Gasteiz
18:00		Report; Live TV:		Stadium: Mendizorroza; Referee: Jorge Figueroa
Note: Postsponed: Due to weather conditions

10 February 2015 23	Osasuna	0–1	Real Zaragoza	Pamplona
19:00		Report; Live TV: Canal+ 1	Ruiz de Galarreta 43'	Stadium: El Sadar; Attendance: 5,000; Referee: José María Sánchez Martínez

14 February 2015 24	Osasuna	0–1	Llagostera	Pamplona
18:00		Report; Live TV: LaLiga TV, Esport3, ETB1	Juanjo 80'	Stadium: El Sadar; Attendance: 11,144; Referee: Rubén Eiriz Mata

21 February 2015 25	Mallorca	3–0	Osasuna	Majorca
18:15	Xisco 36', 73'; Arana 39'	Report; Live TV: LaSexta TV, LAOLA1 TV		Stadium: Iberostar; Attendance: 3,000; Referee: Jorge Valdés Aller

28 February 2015 26	Osasuna	0–2	Lugo	Pamplona
16:00		Report; Live TV: LaLiga TV	Iriome 3'; D. García (o.g.)	Stadium: El Sadar; Attendance: 11,025; Referee: Jesús Muñoz

7 March 2015 27	Racing Santander	2–0	Osasuna	Santander
18:15	Á. García 44'; Granero 63'	Report; Live TV: LAOLA1 TV, LaSexta TV		Stadium: El Sardinero; Attendance: 8,040; Referee: José Luis Munuera Montero

14 March 2015 28	Osasuna	1–1	Alcorcón	Pamplona
16:00	Torres (25 p)	Report; Live TV: LaLiga TV, LAOLA1 TV	Guichón 86'	Stadium: El Sadar; Attendance: 10,585; Referee: David Medié Jiménez

18 March 2015 29	Alavés	3–0	Osasuna	Vitoria-Gasteiz
21:00	M. Barreiro 7', 59'; Llamas 54'	Report; Live TV: LaLiga TV, LAOLA1 TV, EITB 1		Stadium: Mendizorroza; Attendance: 2,500; Referee: Jorge Figueroa

22 March 2015 30	Tenerife	2–1	Osasuna	Tenerife
19:00	Ifrán 35'; Pérez 85'	Report; Live TV: LaLiga TV, LAOLA1 TV, TV Canaria	Nekounam 88' (pen.)	Stadium: Heliodoro Rodríguez López; Attendance: 7,308; Referee: José María Sánchez Martínez

29 March 2015 31	Osasuna	0–0	Sporting de Gijón	Pamplona
12:00		Report; Live TV: LAOLA1 TV, Sports1, Canal+ 1		Stadium: El Sadar; Attendance: 10,500; Referee: Jorge Figueroa

5 April 2015 32	Real Betis	3–0	Osasuna	Seville
12:00	N'Diaye 61'; Castro 67'; Molina 88'	Report; Live TV: LAOLA1 TV, Canal+ 1, Bein Sports 5 HD		Stadium: Benito Villamarín; Attendance: 35,000; Referee: Gorka Sagués Oscoz

12 April 2015 33	Osasuna	1–1	Numancia	Pamplona
18:15	Nino 50'	Live TV:	Vicente 41'	Stadium: El Sadar

18 April 2015 34	Ponferradina	1–0	Osasuna	Ponferrada
18:15		Live TV:		Stadium: El Toralín

25 April 2015 35	Osasuna	2–1	Albacete	Pamplona
18:00		Live TV:		Stadium: El Sadar

2 May 2015 36	Girona	3–0	Osasuna	Girona
--:--		Live TV:		Stadium: Montilivi

9 May 2015 37	Osasuna	2–0	Mirandés	Pamplona
18:00		Live TV:		Stadium: El Sadar

16 May 2015 38	Real Valladolid	1–1	Osasuna	Valladolid
18:15		Live TV:		Stadium: José Zorrilla

19 May 2015 39	Osasuna	1–2	Las Palmas	Pamplona
--:--		Live TV:		Stadium: El Sadar

23 May 2015 40	Leganés	1–1	Osasuna	Leganés
--:--		Live TV:		Stadium: Butarque

30 May 2015 41	Osasuna	2–0	Recreativo Huelva	Pamplona
--:--		Live TV:		Stadium: El Sadar

6 June 2015 42	Sabadell	2–2	Osasuna	Sabadell
--:--		Live TV:		Stadium: Nova Creu Alta

==== Results by round ====
Round	1	2	3	4	5	6	7	8	9	10	11	12	13	14	15	16	17	18	19	20	21	22	23	24	25	26	27	28	29	30	31	32	33	34	35	36	37	38	39	40	41	42
Ground	H	A	H	A	H	A	H	A	H	A	H	A	H	A	H	A	H	A	H	A	H	A	H	H	A	H	A	H	A	A	H	A	H	A	H	A	H	A	H	A	H	A
Result	W	D	L	D	W	L	L	L	W	L	W	D	L	L	D	L	W	W	W	D	D	W	L	L	L	L	L	D	L	L	D	L										
Position	1	4	11	12	9	13	14	16	14	15	14	14	14	16	18	19	17	14	11	12	12	12	12	12	16	16	18	18	18	18	18	19										

Updated to match(es) played on 5 April 2015. Source: Competitive matches
A = Away; H = Home; W = Win; D = Draw; L = Loss

==== Results summary ====
Overall								Home						Away					
Pld	W	D	L	GF	GA	GD	Pts	W	D	L	GF	GA	GD	W	D	L	GF	GA	GD
32	8	8	16	29	48	−19	32	6	4	6	20	21	−1	2	4	10	9	27	−18

Last updated: 5 April 2015.
Source: Competitive matches

==== League table ====
Pos	Team	Pld	W	D	L	GF	GA	GD	Pts	Promotion, qualification or relegation
16	Mallorca	42	13	9	20	51	64	−13	48 (Note: Mallorca ahead on head-to-head record; Mallorca-Tenerife 2-1, Tenerife-Mallorca 0-0)	
17	Tenerife	42	11	15	16	41	48	−7	48	
18	Osasuna	42	11	12	19	41	60	−19	45	
19	Racing Santander (R)	42	12	8	22	42	53	−11	44	Relegation to Segunda División B
20	Recreativo (R)	42	10	11	21	37	59	−22	41	Relegation to Segunda División B

Source: LFP - Liga Adelante
Rules for classification: 1) points; 2) head-to-head points; 3) head-to-head goal difference; 4) goal difference; 5) number of goals scored
(R) Relegated

=== Copa del Rey ===
==== Second round ====
9 September 2014 Single Match	Alavés	2–0 (a.e.t.)	Osasuna	Vitoria-Gasteiz
22:00	Sangalli 115'; Despotović 117'	Report; Live TV: Canal+ Liga 2		Stadium: Mendizorroza; Attendance: 7,392; Referee: Francisco Arias López

== Statistics ==
=== Top goalscorers ===
No.	Pos.	Nation	Name	Liga Adelante	Copa del Rey	Total
7	SS	(Spain)	Nino	9	0	9
6	DM	(Iran)	Javad Nekounam	5	0	5
10	AM	(Spain)	Roberto Torres	3	0	3
23	DM	(Cameroon)	Raoul Loé	2	0	2
9	CF	(Spain)	Kenan Kodro	1	0	1
8	AM	(Spain)	Mikel Merino	1	0	1
2	RB	(Spain)	Javier Flaño	1	0	1
4	CB	(Spain)	Miguel Flaño	1	0	1

=== Assists ===
No.	Pos.	Nation	Name	Liga Adelante	Copa del Rey	Total

=== Minutes played ===
No.	Pos.	Nat.	Name	Liga Adelante	Copa del Rey	Total
1	GK	(Spain)	Riesgo	1,034	0	1,034
2	RB	(Spain)	J. Flaño	2,141	0	2,141
3	CB	(Algeria)	Cadamuro	1,103	120	1,223
4	CB	(Spain)	M. Flaño	2,325	8	2,243
5	LB	(Spain)	Echaide	1,091	120	1,211
6	DM	(Iran)	Nekounam	1,265	120	1,385
7	SS	(Spain)	Nino	2,701	0	2,701
8	RM	(Spain)	Merino	1,724	0	1,724
9	CF	(Spain)	Kodro	1,139	81	1,220
10	AM	(Spain)	Torres	2,114	117	2,231
11	AM	(Spain)	Sisi	2,249	0	2,249
12	CF	(Iran)	Ansarifard	588	3	591
13	GK	(Spain)	Santamaría	1,846	120	1,966
15	RM	(Spain)	Oier	142	0	142
17	LW	(Democratic Republic of the Congo)	Cedrick	1,220	0	1,220
19	CB	(Montenegro)	Vujadinović	1,324	0	1,324
22	CB	(France)	Lotiès	472	0	472
23	DM	(Cameroon)	Loé	1,989	0	1,989
26	GK	(Spain)	Ezkieta	0	0	0
28	CB	(Spain)	D. García	1,584	120	1,704
30	CF	(Spain)	Kike Barja	0	0	0
31	CM	(Spain)	J. García	253	112	365
33	CF	(Spain)	Berenguer	391	39	392
34	CB	(Spain)	De Frutos	0	0	0
35	LM	(Spain)	Olavide	514	0	514
36	AM	(Spain)	Sola	75	0	75
37	GK	(Spain)	Juan	0	0	0
39	LB	(Spain)	Buñuel	0	0	0
40	DM	(Spain)	Otegui	0	0	0

=== Bookings ===
N	P	Nat.	Name	League			Cup			Total			Notes
N	P	Nat.	Name	Yellow card	Second yellow card	Red card	Yellow card	Second yellow card	Red card	Yellow card	Second yellow card	Red card	Notes
1	GK	(Spain)	Riesgo	1						1			
2	RB	(Spain)	J. Flaño	9	1	1				9	1	1	
3	CB	(Algeria)	Cadamuro	8						8			
4	CB	(Spain)	M. Flaño	7	1					7	1		
5	LB	(Spain)	Echaide	5						5			
6	DM	(Iran)	Nekounam	3	2					3	2		
7	SS	(Spain)	Nino	6						6			
8	AM	(Spain)	Merino	9		1				9		1	
9	CF	(Spain)	Kodro	1						1			
10	AM	(Spain)	Torres	6			1			7			
11	AM	(Spain)	Sisi	6						6			
12	CF	(Iran)	Ansarifard										
13	GK	(Spain)	Santamaría	2						2			
15	RM	(Spain)	Oier	1						1			
17	LW	(Democratic Republic of the Congo)	Cedrick	2						2			
19	CB	(Montenegro)	Vujadinović	6	2					6	2		
22	CB	(France)	Lotiès	1						1			
23	DM	(Cameroon)	Loé	9						9			
26	GK	(Spain)	Ezkieta										
28	CB	(Spain)	D. García	5						5			
30	CF	(Spain)	Kike Barja										
31	CM	(Spain)	J. García	2		1	1			3		1	
33	CF	(Spain)	Berenguer	2						2			
34	CB	(Spain)	De Frutos										
35	LM	(Spain)	Olavide	3	1					3	1		
37	AM	(Spain)	Sola										

Last updated: 29 March 2015
Source: Matches
Ordered by (red card) , (second yellow card) and (yellow card)
(yellow card) = Number of bookings; (second yellow card) = Number of sending offs after a second yellow card; (red card) = Number of sending offs by a direct red card.

=== Match statistics ===
Match stats	Liga Adelante	Copa del Rey	Total
Games played	32	1	33
Games won	8	0	8
Games drawn	8	0	8
Games lost	16	1	16
Goals scored	29	0	29
Goals conceded	50	2	50
Goal difference	-19	-2	-21
Clean sheets	7	0	7
Goal by substitute			
Total shots	264	15	
Shots on target	104	4	
Shots off target	151	11	
Corners	154	4	155
Players used	28	14	42
Offsides	74	4	
Fouls suffered	439	21	
Fouls committed	205	21	
Yellow cards	88	2	90
Red cards	10	0	10

Last updated: 5 April 2015
