= 2013–14 CA Osasuna season =

Osasuna
2013–14 season
- President: Miguel Archanco
- Head coach: Javi Gracia
- Stadium: El Sadar
- La Liga: 18th (Relegated)
- Copa del Rey: Round of 16
- Top goalscorer: League: Oriol Riera (13); All: Oriol Riera (13)
- Highest home attendance: 19,398 vs Real Betis (18 May 2014)
- Lowest home attendance: 10,403 vs Real Madrid (15 January 2014)
- Average home league attendance: 14,184 vs Getafe (9 February 2014)
Home colours	Away colours

The 2013–14 CA Osasuna season was the 93rd season in club history. Osasuna completed a record 13th consecutive season in the Spanish top flight.

== Players and staff ==
=== Squad information ===
N	Pos.	Nat.	Name	Age	EU	Since	App	Goals	Ends	Transfer fee	Notes
1	GK	(Spain)	Riesgo	42	EU	2010	5	0	2016		
2	RB	(Spain)	Bertrán	44	EU	2011	30	0	2014		
3	LB	(Spain)	J. Oriol	39	EU	2013	14	0	2014	Free	
4	CB	(Spain)	M. Flaño (1st VC)	42	EU	2004	16	0	2017	Youth system	
5	DM	(Spain)	Lolo	42	EU	2010	21	0	2014	Free	
6	SS	(Spain)	Nino	46	EU	2011	4	0	2016	?	
7	CF	(Paraguay)	J. Acuña	38	Non-EU	2014	16	3	2014	Loan	
8	RM	(Spain)	De las Cuevas	40	EU						
9	LW	(Argentina)	Armenteros	40	Non-EU	2012	31	5	2014	Free	
10	DM	(Spain)	Puñal (captain)	51	EU	2000	29	2	2014	End of Loan	
11	LW	(Spain)	Sisi	40	EU						
12	CB	(Spain)	Satrústegui	35	EU						
13	GK	(Spain)	Andrés	39	EU	2011	38	0	2014	End of Loan	
14	CB	(Spain)	Arribas	37	EU						
15	LB	(Spain)	Oier	40	EU	2007	32	0	2015	End of Loan	
16	RW	(Spain)	Cejudo	42	EU	2011	33	2	2014	€320Th	
17	LM	(Spain)	Lobato	37	EU	2014	11	0	2014	Free agent	
18	CF	(Spain)	Onwu	38	EU	2012	14	1	2015	Youth system	
19	CF	(Spain)	Riera	40	EU	2013	41	13	2014	€700Th	
20	DM	(Chile)	Silva	40	Non-EU	2013	34	0	2014	€1.20M	
21	AM	(Spain)	Torres	37	EU	2012	18	2	2016	Youth system	
22	CB	(France)	Lotiès	42	EU	2013	33	0	2016	Free	
23	DM	(Cameroon)	Loé	37	Non-EU						
24	RB	(Spain)	Damià	44	EU						
26	GK	(Spain)	Cantero	31	EU						
30	LM	(Spain)	Gómez	31	EU						
31	CM	(Spain)	J. García	31	EU						

- Last updated: 1 June 2013
- Source: Osasuna.es, Players in / out, Wikipedia players' articles, ESPN (for appearances and goals) and footballdatabase.com (for EU and passport)

=== Technical staff ===
Position	Staff
Head coach	Javi Gracia
Assistant coach	Alfredo Sánchez Benito
Goalkeeper coach	Javier Vicuña Urtesun
Physical fitness coach	Toni Ruiz
football Director	Angel Martín González

Last updated: 7 July
Source: Osasuna Official Website

== Transfers ==
=== In ===
No.	Pos.	Nat.	Name	Age	EU	Moving from	Type	Transfer window	Ends	Transfer fee	Source
7	CF	(Paraguay)	J. Acuña	38	Non-EU	Watford FC	On loan	Winter	2014	Loan	
17	LM	(Spain)	Lobato	37	EU	Free agent	Transfer	Winter	2014	Free agent	
17	SS	(Spain)	Núñez	38	EU	Club Libertad	On loan	Summer	2014		
19	CF	(Spain)	Riera	40	EU	AD Alcorcón	Transfer	Summer	2014	€0.7M	
12	CB	(Spain)	Satrústegui	35	EU	CD Numancia	On loan	Summer	2014	End of loan	
3	LB	(Spain)	J. Oriol	39	EU	Villarreal CF	Transfer	Summer	2014	Free	
25	GK	(Spain)	Zabal	39	EU	SD Huesca		Summer			
22	CB	(France)	Lotiès	42	EU	AS Nancy	Transfer	Summer	2016	Free	
8	RM	(Spain)	De las Cuevas	40	EU	Sporting Gijón	Transfer	Summer	2015	€1.2M	
20	DM	(Chile)	Silva	40	Non-EU	CD Universidad Católica	Transfer	Summer	2014	€1.2M	
3	LM	(Spain)	Annunziata	39	EU	SD Huesca	Transfer	Summer	2014	End of loan	

Total spending: ▼€3.1M

=== Out ===
No.	Pos.	Nat.	Name	Age	EU	Moving to	Type	Transfer window	Transfer fee	Source

Total spending ▲€0

== Kits ==
Supplier: Adidas
Sponsor(s): Lacturale

Home	Away

Last updated: 22 July 2013.
Source: Osasuna.es

== Friendlies ==
=== Legend ===
Win Draw Loss Postponed

=== Pre-season ===
19 July 2013 Preseason	Ajax (Netherlands)	1–0	(Spain) Osasuna	Emmen, Drenthe, Netherlands
12:30	Klaassen 6'	Report		Stadium: Univé Stadion; Attendance: 2,500

20 July 2013 Pre-season	NAC Breda (Netherlands)	0–0	(Spain) Osasuna	Sint Willebrord, North Brabant, Netherlands
		Report		Stadium: Sportpark de Gagelrijzen; Attendance: 1,500; Referee: Kevin Blon (Netherlands)

23 July 2013 Pre-season	Twente (Netherlands)	0–0	(Spain) Osasuna	Enschede, Twente, Netherlands
		Report		Stadium: De Grolsch Veste; Attendance: 5,750; Referee: Van Sichen (Netherlands)

27 July 2013 Pre-season	Heerenveen (Netherlands)	2–2	(Spain) Osasuna	Heerenveen, Netherlands
				Stadium: Abe Lenstra Stadion

28 July 2013 Pre-season	NEC (Netherlands)	1–1	(Spain) Osasuna	Nijmegen, Netherlands
				Stadium: Stadion de Goffert

2 August 2013 Pre-season	Tenerife (Spain)	2–1	(Spain) Osasuna	Tenerife, Canary Islands, Spain
				Stadium: Heliodoro Rodríguez López

6 August 2013 Pre-season	Osasuna (Spain)	2–1	(Spain) Real Zaragoza	Tudela, Navarre, Spain

7 August 2013 Pre-season	Peña Sport (Spain)	0–1	(Spain) Osasuna	Tafalla, Navarre, Spain
				Stadium: San Francisco

10 August 2013 Pre-season	Real Valladolid (Spain)	1–1	(Spain) Osasuna	Burgos, Navarre, Spain
				Stadium: El Plantío

== Competitions ==
=== Overall ===
Competition	Started round	Final position / round	First match	Last match
La Liga	—	18th	18 August 2013	18 May 2014
Copa del Rey	Round of 32	Round of 16	8 December 2013	15 January 2014

Updated to match played 17 July 2014
Source: Competitions

=== La Liga ===
==== Legend ====
Win Draw Lose postpone

==== Matches ====
Kickoff times are in CET and CEST

18 August 2013 1	Osasuna	1–2	Granada	Pamplona, Navarre
20:00	Puñal 58'	Report; Live TV:	El-Arabi 38'; Yebda 45+2'	Stadium: El Sadar; Attendance: 13,427; Referee: José González

23 August 2013 2	Athletic Bilbao	2–0	Osasuna	Bilbao, Basque Country
21:00	Arribas 31' (o.g.); De Marcos 82'	Report; Live TV:		Stadium: Anoeta; Attendance: 32,000; Referee: César Muñiz

31 August 2013 3	Osasuna	0–3	Villarreal	Pamplona, Navarre
22:00		Report; Live TV:	Perbet 22'; Aquino 30'; Uche 75'	Stadium: El Sadar; Attendance: 12,474; Referee: David Fernández

15 September 2013 4	Getafe	2–1	Osasuna	Getafe, Madrid
16:00	Fedor 35', 52'	Report; Live TV:	Torres 11'	Stadium: El Sadar; Attendance: 8,000; Referee: Antonio Mateu

20 September 2013 5	Osasuna	2–1	Elche	Pamplona, Navarre
20:00	Armenteros 16'; Riera 48'	Report; Live TV:	Albácar (88 p)	Stadium: El Sadar; Attendance: 13,566; Referee: Carlos del Cerro

24 September 2013 6	Atlético Madrid	2–1	Osasuna	Madrid, Community of Madrid
21:00	Costa 18', 25'	Report; Live TV:	Riera 42'	Stadium: Vicente Calderón; Attendance: 43,000; Referee: Javier Estrada

29 September 2013 7	Osasuna	0–1	Levante	Pamplona, Navarre
11:00		Report; Live TV:	Xumetra 88'	Stadium: El Sadar; Attendance: 13,488; Referee: José Teixeria

4 October 2013 8	Málaga	0–1	Osasuna	Málaga, Andalusia
21:00		Report; Live TV:	Riera 23'	Stadium: La Rosaleda; Attendance: 21,538; Referee: Jesús Gil

19 October 2013 9	Osasuna	0–0	Barcelona	Pamplona, Navarre
19:00		Report; Live TV:		Stadium: El Sadar; Attendance: 16,123; Referee: Pedro Pérez

27 October 2013 10	Sevilla	2–1	Osasuna	Seville, Andalusia
11:00	Rakitić 55'; Jairo 75'	Report; Live TV:	Riera 87'	Stadium: Ramón Sánchez Pizjuán; Attendance: 30,582; Referee: José González

30 October 2013 11	Osasuna	3–1	Rayo Vallecano	Pamplona, Navarre
21:00	Oier 1'; Riera 13'; Torres 58'	Report; Live TV:	Gálvez 71'	Stadium: El Sadar; Attendance: 11,109; Referee: Miguel Ayza

2 November 2013 12	Real Sociedad	5–0	Osasuna	San Sebastián, Basque country
15:00	Ansotegi 33'; I. Martínez 48'; Griezmann 56'; Castro 81'; Seferovic 88'	Report; Live TV:		Stadium: Anoeta; Attendance: 25,938; Referee: Carlos del Cerro

8 November 2013 13	Osasuna	0–1	Almería	Pamplona, Navarre
19:00		Report; Live TV:	Rodri 18'	Stadium: El Sadar; Attendance: 14,654; Referee: Antonio Mateu

22 November 2013 14	Real Valladolid	0–1	Osasuna	Valladolid, Castile and León
20:00		Live TV:	Oier 84'	Stadium: Nuevo José Zorrilla; Attendance: 12,103; Referee: David Fernández

1 December 2013 15	Valencia	3–0	Osasuna	Valencia, Valencia
18:00	Jonas 45', 48', 53'	Live TV:		Stadium: El Sadar; Attendance: 31,000; Referee: Carlos Velasco

14 December 2013 16	Osasuna	2–2	Real Madrid	Pamplona, Navarre, Spain
15:00	Riera 16', 39'	Live TV:	Isco 45'; Pepe 80'	Stadium: El Sadar; Attendance: 15,978; Referee: Clos Gómez

22 December 2013 17	Celta Vigo	1–1	Osasuna	Vigo, Galicia
20:00	Fernández 34'	Report; Live TV:	Armenteros 17'	Stadium: Balaídos; Attendance: 14,500; Referee: Carlos Delgado

5 January 2014 18	Osasuna	1–0	Espanyol	Pamplona, Navarre
17:00	Cejudo 33'	Live TV:		Stadium: El Sadar; Attendance: 11,725; Referee: Ignacio Iglesias

12 January 2014 19	Real Betis	1–2	Osasuna	Seville, Andalusia
16:00	Molina 80'	Live TV:	Torres 2'; Jordi (o.g.)	Stadium: Benito Villamarín; Attendance: 33,775; Referee: Fernando Teixeira

19 January 2014 20	Granada	0–0	Osasuna	Granada, Andalusia
19:00		Live TV:		Stadium: Los Cármenes; Attendance: 11,536; Referee: Juan Martínez Munuera

26 January 2014 21	Osasuna	1–5	Athletic Bilbao	Pamplona, Navarre
14:00	Armenteros 10'	Live TV:	Susaeta 3'; Aduriz 16', 62'; Ibai 84'; Sola 88'	Stadium: El Sadar; Attendance: 14,318; Referee: Carlos Velasco

2 February 2014 22	Villarreal	3–1	Osasuna	Villarreal, Valencia
21:00	Perbet 47', 75'; Trigueros 55'	Live TV:	Riera 88'	Stadium: El Madrigal; Attendance: 9,260; Referee: Alfonso Álvarez

9 February 2014 23	Osasuna	2–0	Getafe	Pamplona, Navarre
11:00	Riera 6'; Torres 88'	Live TV:		Stadium: El Sadar; Attendance: 14,184; Referee: César Muñiz

14 February 2014 24	Elche	0–0	Osasuna	Elche, Valencia
20:00		Live TV:		Stadium: Manuel Martínez Valero; Attendance: 21,752; Referee: Alejandro Hernández

23 February 2014 25	Osasuna	3–0	Atlético Madrid	Pamplona, Navarre
20:00	Cejudo 6'; Armenteros 21'; Torres 42'	Live TV:		Stadium: El Sadar; Attendance: 15,361; Referee: Juan Martínez Munuera

1 March 2014 26	Levante	2–0	Osasuna	Valencia, Valencia
17:00	Diop 4'; R. García 42'	Live TV:		Stadium: Ciutat de València; Attendance: 11,323; Referee: Pedro Pérez

10 March 2014 27	Osasuna	0–2	Málaga	Pamplona, Navarre
19:00		Live TV:	Samu 14'; Amrabat 66'	Stadium: El Sadar; Attendance: 15,300; Referee: Fernando Teixeira

16 March 2014 28	Barcelona	7–0	Osasuna	Barcelona, Catalonia
16:00	Messi 18', 63', 88'; Sánchez 22'; Iniesta 34'; Tello 78'; Pedro 90'	Live TV:		Stadium: Camp Nou; Attendance: 71,764; Referee: José Teixeira

23 March 2014 29	Osasuna	1–2	Sevilla	Pamplona, Navarre
11:00	Acuña 90+4'	Live TV:	Jairo 28'; Bacca (45+1 p)	Stadium: El Sadar; Attendance: 14,164; Referee: Alfonso Álvarez

26 March 2014 30	Rayo Vallecano	1–0	Osasuna	Vallecas, Madrid
19:00	Larrivey 90' (pen.)	Live TV:		Stadium: Vallecas; Attendance: 10,330; Referee: Ignacio Iglesias

30 March 2014 31	Osasuna	1–1	Real Sociedad	Pamplona, Navarre
16:00	Riera 59'	Live TV:	Castro 8'	Stadium: El Sadar; Attendance: 14,137; Referee: David Fernández

4 April 2014 32	Almería	1–2	Osasuna	Almería, Andalusia
20:00	Soriano 73'	Live TV:	Riera 19'; Arribas 33'	Stadium: Jueos Mediterráneos; Attendance: 8,958; Referee: Antonio Mateu

11 April 2014 33	Osasuna	0–0	Real Valladolid	Pamplona, Navarre
20:00		Live TV:		Stadium: El Sadar; Attendance: 17,914; Referee: Clos Gómez

19 April 2014 34	Osasuna	1–1	Valencia	Pamplona, Navarre
15:00	Riera 19'	Live TV:	Jonas 82'	Stadium: El Sadar; Attendance: 16,975; Referee: Javier Estrada

26 April 2014 35	Real Madrid	4–0	Osasuna	Madrid, Madrid
19:00	Ronaldo 6', 52'; Ramos 60'; Carvajal 83'	Live TV:		Stadium: Santiago Bernabéu; Attendance: 68,930; Referee: Fernando Teixeira

3 May 2014 36	Osasuna	0–2	Celta Vigo	Pamplona, Navarre
19:00		Live TV:	Nolito 20', 34'	Stadium: El Sadar; Attendance: 18,299; Referee: Jesús Gil

11 May 2014 37	Espanyol	1–1	Osasuna	Barcelona, Catalonia
18:00	Colotto 21'	Live TV:	Acuña 44'	Stadium: Cornellà-El Prat; Attendance: 21,950; Referee: Ignacio Iglesias

18 May 2014 38	Osasuna	2–1	Real Betis	Pamplona, Navarre
17:00	Riera 12'; Acuña 22'	Live TV:	Chica 71'	Stadium: El Sadar; Attendance: 19,398; Referee: Juan Martínez Munuera

==== Results by round ====
Round	1	2	3	4	5	6	7	8	9	10	11	12	13	14	15	16	17	18	19	20	21	22	23	24	25	26	27	28	29	30	31	32	33	34	35	36	37	38
Ground	H	A	H	A	H	A	H	A	H	A	H	A	H	A	H	H	A	H	A	A	H	A	H	A	H	A	H	A	H	A	H	A	H	H	A	H	A	H
Result	L	L	L	L	W	L	L	W	D	L	W	L	L	W	L	D	D	W	W	D	L	L	W	D	W	L	L	L	L	L	D	W	D	D	L	L	D	W
Position	14	20	20	20	18	19	19	18	18	19	16	17	19	15	16	17	18	15	13	13	14	16	14	13	12	12	15	15	17	17	19	16	16	15	16	19	18	18

Updated to match(es) played on 20 July 2014. Source: Competitive matches
A = Away; H = Home; W = Win; D = Draw; L = Loss

==== Results summary ====
Overall								Home						Away					
Pld	W	D	L	GF	GA	GD	Pts	W	D	L	GF	GA	GD	W	D	L	GF	GA	GD
38	10	9	19	32	62	−30	39	6	5	8	20	25	−5	4	4	11	12	37	−25

Last updated: 20 July 2014.
Source: Competitive matches

=== Copa del Rey ===
==== Round of 32 ====
8 December 2013 First Leg	Málaga	3–3	Osasuna	Málaga, Andalusia
20:00	Sánchez 31'; Antunes 38'; Juanmi 47'	Report; Live TV:	Torres 57'; Onwu 61'; Armenteros 78'	Stadium: La Rosaleda; Attendance: 22,000; Referee: Jesús Gil

17 December 2013 Second Leg	Osasuna	1–1 (4–4 agg.)	Málaga	Pamplona, Navarre
19:00	Weligton 1' (o.g.)	Report; Live TV:	Eliseu 61'	Stadium: El Sadar; Attendance: 10,538; Referee: Miguel Ayza

==== Round of 16 ====
9 January 2014 First Leg	Real Madrid	2–0	CA Osasuna	Madrid, Community of Madrid
20:30	Benzema 19'; Jesé 60'	Report; Live TV:		Stadium: Santiago Bernabéu; Attendance: 63,871; Referee: Pedro Pérez

15 January 2014 Second Leg	Osasuna	0–2 (0–4 agg.)	Real Madrid	Pamplona, Navarre
20:30		Report; Live TV:	Ronaldo 21'; Di María 55'	Stadium: El Sadar; Attendance: 10,403; Referee: Antonio Mateu
