= 2012–13 CA Osasuna season =

Osasuna
2012–13 season
- President: Miguel Archanco
- Head coach: José Luis Mendilibar
- Stadium: El Sadar
- La Liga: 16th
- Copa del Rey: Round of 16
Home colours	Away colours

The 2012–13 CA Osasuna season was the 92nd season in the club's history. Osasuna competed in La Liga and the Copa del Rey.

== Players ==
Note: Flags indicate national team as defined under FIFA eligibility rules; some limited exceptions apply. Players may hold more than one non-FIFA nationality.

No.	Pos.	Nation	Player
1	GK	ESP	Asier Riesgo
2	DF	ESP	Marc Bertrán
3	DF	ESP	Rubén
4	DF	ESP	Miguel Flaño (vice-captain)
5	DF	ESP	Lolo
6	MF	ESP	Miguel de las Cuevas (on loan from Sporting)
7	FW	ESP	Kike Sola
8	MF	IRI	Masoud Shojaei
9	MF	ARG	Emiliano Armenteros
10	MF	ESP	Patxi Puñal (captain)
11	MF	GHA	Anthony Annan
12	FW	ESP	Joseba Llorente
13	GK	ESP	Andrés

No.	Pos.	Nation	Player
14	DF	ESP	Alejandro Arribas
15	DF	ESP	Oier
16	MF	ESP	Álvaro Cejudo
17	FW	ESP	Nino
18	FW	ESP	Manuel Onwu
19	MF	ESP	Nano
20	MF	CHI	Francisco Silva
21	MF	ESP	Roberto Torres
22	MF	ESP	David Timor
23	MF	FRA	Raoul Loé
24	DF	ESP	Damià
25	GK	ESP	Ricardo
—	MF	ESP	Sisi

== Competitions ==
=== Liga BBVA ===
==== Legend ====
Win Draw Lose Postpone

==== Matches ====
Kickoff times are in CET and CEST

20 August 2012 1	Deportivo	2–0	Osasuna	A Coruña
18:00 BTS (UTC 00)	Evaldo (yellow card) 17'; Riki 53'; Aythami (yellow card) 57'; Domínguez (yellow card) 67'; Oliveira 90'	Report	Sisi (yellow card) 36' Flaño (yellow card) 45' Damià (yellow card) 63' Fernández (yellow card) 75'	Stadium: Riazor; Attendance: 36,000; Referee: David Fernández Borbalán

26 August 2012 2	Osasuna	1–2	Barcelona	Pamplona
19:00	Llorente 17'; Sisi (yellow card) 27'; Arribas (yellow card) 34'; Damià (yellow card) 37'; Loé (yellow card) 48'; Flaño (yellow card) 52'; Puñal (red card) 75'; Lamah (yellow card) 79'; Lolo (yellow card) 87'	Report	Busquets (yellow card) 36'; Messi 76', 80'; Piqué (yellow card) 79'; Puyol (yellow card) 81'	Stadium: El Sadar; Attendance: 15,691; Referee: Muñiz Fernández (Asturias)
Note: Barcelona manager Tito Vilanova was sent off in the 71st minute for "angrily protesting after being warned."

1 September 2012 3	Celta Vigo	2–0	Osasuna	Vigo
16:00	Túñez (yellow card) 65'; Aspas 69'; Bermejo 90+3'	Report	Flaño (yellow card) 62'; Arribas (yellow card) 75' (yellow-red card) 83'; Annan (yellow card) 77'	Stadium: Balaídos; Attendance: 15,923; Referee: Alejandro Hernández Hernández

16 September 2012 4	Osasuna	1 – 1	Mallorca	Pamplona
18:00	Sola 69'		Hemed 78'	Stadium: El Sadar; Attendance: 15,000; Referee: Miguel Ángel Ayza Gámez

22 September 2012 5	Real Zaragoza	3 – 1	Osasuna	Zaragoza
16:00	Postiga 4'; Timor 45' (o.g.); Abraham (yellow card) 67'; Apoño 71' (pen.); Paredes (yellow card) 84'	Summary	Armenteros 29', (yellow card) 77'; Loé (yellow card) 70'	Stadium: La Romareda; Attendance: 22,000; Referee: Miguel Pérez Lasa; Assistant referees: Teodoro Sobrino Magán; Jacobo Martínez Segovia; Fourth official: Carlos Moreno

30 September 2012 6	Osasuna	4–0	Levante	Pamplona
18:00	Armenteros 54'; Lamah 81'; Timor 88'; Nino 90+2'	Report		Stadium: El Sadar; Attendance: 19,000; Referee: Álvarez Izquierdo

7 October 2012 7	Athletic Bilbao	1–0	Osasuna	Bilbao
18:00	Aduriz 11'	Report		Stadium: San Mamés; Referee: José Luis González González

21 October 2012 8	Osasuna	0–0	Real Betis	Pamplona
19:50 CEST	Cejudo (yellow card) 30'; Armenteros (yellow card) 66'; Damià (yellow card) 82'	Summary	Paulão (yellow card) 63'	Stadium: El Sadar; Attendance: 15,215; Referee: Carlos Velasco Carballo (Community of Madrid)

28 October 2012 9	Atlético Madrid	3–1	Osasuna	Madrid
19:45	Miranda (yellow card) 8', (goal) 31'; Godín (yellow card) 25'; García 35'; Falcao (yellow card) 66', (goal) 73'	Report	Lamah (yellow card) 31', (goal) 43'; Arribas (yellow card) 40'; Lolo (yellow card) 90'	Stadium: Vicente Calderón; Attendance: 45,000; Referee: Antonio Mateu Lahoz (Valencian Community)

4 November 2012 10	Osasuna	0–1	Valladolid	Pamplona
17:50 CET	Rubén (yellow card) 16' (yellow-red card) 75'; Armenteros (yellow card) 44'	(Report); Live TV: GolT /	(yellow card) 20' Pérez; (yellow card) 40' Manucho; (yellow card) 54' Neira; 82' Ebert	Stadium: El Sadar; Attendance: 14,068; Referee: (Andalusia) Pedro Pérez Montero

10 November 2012 11	Espanyol	0–3	Osasuna	Barcelona
18:00	Stuani (yellow card) 29'; Moreno (yellow card) 88'	Report	Timor (yellow card) 17'; Cejudo 22'; Armenteros (yellow card) 32'; Damià (yellow card) 48'; Sola 63'; Arribas (yellow card) 72'; Onwu 77'	Stadium: Cornellà-El Prat; Attendance: 20,523; Referee: Jesús Gil Manzano

17 November 2012 12	Osasuna	0–0	Málaga	Pamplona
15:00 CEST	Damià (yellow card) 30'; Sisi (yellow card) 85'; Loé (yellow card) 87'; Arribas (yellow card) 88'	Report	Toulalan (yellow card) 90+2'	Stadium: El Sadar; Attendance: 15,956; Referee: Xavier Estrada Fernández (Catalonia)

25 November 2012 13	Real Sociedad	0 – 0	Osasuna	San Sebastián
21:30 CEST	González (yellow card) 22'; Illarramendi (yellow card) 27'; De la Bella (yellow card) 37'	Report	Nano (yellow card) 7'; Sola (yellow card) 38'; Arribas (yellow card) 44'; Armenteros (yellow card) 53'	Stadium: Anoeta; Attendance: 20500

14

8 December 2012 15	Osasuna	0 – 1	Valencia	Pamplona
22:00 (CET)	Lolo (yellow card) 69'; Damià (yellow card) 78'	Report; VCF Report; SD Report; AS Report; MARCA Report; Live TV: Gol T /	R. Costa (yellow card) 25'; Soldado 55'; Albelda (yellow card) 80'	Stadium: El Sadar; Attendance: 13,849; Referee: Ignacio Iglesias Villanueva (Galicia)

15 December 2012 16	Getafe	1–1	Osasuna	Getafe
	Lopo (yellow card) 65'; Lafita (yellow card) 74'; Míchel (yellow card) 75'; Valera (yellow card) 83'; Castro 90+2'		Nano (yellow card) 48'; Armenteros (red card) 78'; Sola 85', (yellow card) 86'; Oier (yellow card) 88'; Puñal (yellow card) 90+1'	Stadium: Coliseum Alfonso Pérez; Attendance: 8,000; Referee: José Antonio Teixeira Vitienes

17

5 January 2013 18	Sevilla	1–0	Osasuna	Seville
22:00 CET	Cicinho (yellow card) 49'; Spahić (yellow card) 68', (goal) 83'	(Report); Live TV: GolT /	Bertrán (yellow card) 46'	Stadium: Ramón Sánchez Pizjuán; Attendance: 20,000; Referee: (Community of Madrid) Carlos del Cerro Grande

12 January 2013 19	Osasuna	0–0	Real Madrid	Pamplona
20:00 CET (UTC+01:00)	Rubén (yellow card) 12'; Oier (yellow card) 45'; Armenteros (yellow card) 57'; Lolo (yellow card) 90+1'	Report	Kaká (yellow card) 60' (yellow-red card) 76'; Alonso (yellow card) 69'; Özil (yellow card) 90+1'	Stadium: El Sadar; Attendance: 16,366; Referee: Carlos Clos Gómez (Aragon)

20

27 January 2013 21	Barcelona	5–1	Osasuna	Barcelona
19:00	Messi 11', 28' (pen.), 56', 58'; Adriano (yellow card) 13'; Pedro 41'	Report	Arribas (yellow card) 18' (yellow-red card) 27'; Loé 24'; Oier (yellow card) 51'	Stadium: Camp Nou; Attendance: 65,594; Referee: Teixeira Vitienes (Cantabria)
Note: Osasuna manager José Luis Mendilibar was booked (red card) in the 32nd minute.

2 February 2013 22	Osasuna	1–0	Celta Vigo	Pamplona
	Armenteros 55'; Rubén (yellow card) 59'; Damià (yellow card) 85'	Report	Lago (yellow card) 10'; Bermejo (yellow card) 33'; Toni (yellow card) 83'	Stadium: El Sadar; Attendance: 14,404; Referee: Alejandro Hernández Hernández

23 24 25 26

8 March 2013 27	Betis	2–1	Osasuna	Seville
CET	Molina 19'; Nacho (yellow card) 29'; Juan Carlos (yellow card) 57'; Beñat (yellow card) 69'; Paulão (yellow card) 72'; Nono (yellow card) 76'; Castro 79'	Summary	Oier (yellow card) 26'; Damià (yellow card) 41'; Armenteros (yellow card) 52'; Silva 74', (red card) 90'; Arribas (yellow card) 83'	Stadium: Benito Villamarín; Attendance: 23,824; Referee: Alejandro Hernández Hernández

17 March 2013 28	Osasuna	0–2	Atlético Madrid	Pamplona
19:00	Damià (yellow card) 39'	Report	Juanfran (yellow card) 7'; Costa 35', 48', (yellow card) 47'; Koke (yellow card) 57'; Gabi (yellow card) 90'	Stadium: El Sadar; Attendance: 19,512; Referee: Pedro Jesús Pérez Montero (Andalusia)

31 March 2013 29	Valladolid	1–3	Osasuna	Valladolid
12:00	Rubén 11' (o.g.); Rueda (yellow card) 45'	Summary	Sola 50', 60'; De las Cuevas (yellow card) 58', (goal) 69'	Stadium: Nuevo José Zorrilla; Attendance: 12,624; Referee: Miguel Pérez Lasa

7 April 2013 30	Osasuna	0–2	Espanyol	Pamplona
	Arribas (yellow card) 18'; Oier (yellow card) 69'; Bertrán (yellow card) 77'; Silva (yellow card) 81'		Stuani (yellow card) 12'; Moreno (yellow card) 36', (goal) 51'; Colotto (yellow card) 54'; López (yellow card) 71'; Wakaso 90+1'	Stadium: El Sadar; Attendance: 17,501; Referee: Jesús Gil Manzano

13 April 2013 31	Málaga	1–0	Osasuna	Málaga
22:00 CEST	Iturra (yellow card) 78'; Baptista 90+2'	Report	Sola (yellow card) 43'; Bertrán (yellow card) 69'; Puñal (yellow card) 90+2'; Shojaei (yellow card) 90+4'	Stadium: La Rosaleda; Attendance: 29,000; Referee: Carlos Velasco Carballo

21 April 2013 32	Osasuna	0 – 0	Real Sociedad	Pamplona
19:00 CET (UTC+01:00)	Armenteros (yellow card) 11'; Nano (yellow card) 23'; Arribas (yellow card) 47'; Oier (yellow card) 84'	Report	(yellow card) 10' González; (yellow card) 18' Griezmann; (yellow card) 28' Cadamuro; (yellow card) 44' Vela	Stadium: El Sadar; Referee: Antonio Mateu Lahoz

33

4 May 2013 34	Valencia	4 – 0	Osasuna	Valencia
16:00 (CEST)	Jonas (yellow card) 14', (goal) 89' (pen.); Soldado 38'; R. Costa 43'; Banega 59'; Pereira (yellow card) 85'	Report; VCF Report; SD Report; AS Report; MARCA Report; Live TV: Gol T /	Silva (yellow card) 41'; Arribas (red card) 57'; Timor (yellow card) 68' (yellow-red card) 74'; Bertrán (yellow card) 87'; Nano (yellow card) 89'	Stadium: Estadio Mestalla; Attendance: 35,000; Referee: Carlos del Cerro Grande

11 May 2013 35	Osasuna	1–0	Getafe	Pamplona
	Armenteros (yellow card) 28'; Puñal (yellow card) 67'; Arribas 75'; Llorente (yellow card) 90+1'		Rafa (yellow card) 19'; Borja (yellow card) 44'; Lacen (yellow card) 60'; Míchel (yellow card) 71'; Pedro León (yellow card) 90'	Stadium: El Sadar; Attendance: 18,012; Referee: Alfonso Álvarez Izquierdo

36

29 May 2013 37	Osasuna	2–1	Sevilla	Pamplona
14:00	Puñal 63'; Cejudo 79'; Riesgo (yellow card) 79'; Bertrán (yellow card) 85'; Damià (yellow card) 86'; Arribas (yellow card) 90+3'		Negredo 50'; Botía (yellow card) 60'; Kondogbia (yellow card) 62'	Stadium: El Sadar; Attendance: 19,594; Referee: César Muñiz Fernández

1 June 2013 38	Real Madrid	4–2	Osasuna	Madrid
17:00 CEST (UTC+02:00)	Higuaín 35', (yellow card) 44'; Essien 38'; Benzema 69'; Callejón 87'	Report	U. García (yellow card) 44'; Torres 52'; Cejudo 63'	Stadium: Santiago Bernabéu; Attendance: 55,000; Referee: Miguel Ángel Pérez Lasa (Basque Country); Man of the Match: Higuaín, Jesús

=== Copa del Rey ===
==== Round of 32 ====
1 November 2012 First leg	Sporting Gijón	1–0	Osasuna
18:00	Sangoy 15'

27 November 2012 Second leg	Osasuna	2–0 (2–1 agg.)	Sporting Gijón
18:00	Llorente 70'; Rubén 76'

==== Round of 16 ====
11 December 2012 First leg	Osasuna	0–2	Valencia
19:00			Parejo 47'; Soldado 90'

8 January 2012 Second leg	Valencia	2–1 (4–1 agg.)	Osasuna
14:30	T. Costa 36'; Soldado 90'		Llorente 37'

== Players and evens ==
=== Squad information ===
N	Pos.	Nat.	Name	Age	EU	Since	App	Goals	Ends	Transfer fee	Notes
8	CM	(Iran)	M. Shojaei	42	Non-EU	2008	100	8	2013		
10	CM	(Spain)	Puñal (captain)	51	EU	1997	432	22	2013		
13	GK	(Spain)	Fernández	39	EU	2007	76	0	2015		

- Last updated: 1 June 2013
- Source: Osasuna.es, Players in / out, Wikipedia players' articles, ESPN (for appearances and goals) and footballdatabase.com (for EU passport)

=== Transfers out ===
Date	Pos.	Name	To	Fee	Source
15 January 2013	MF	(Ivory Coast) Roland Lamah	(England) Swansea City	Free	

== Squad ==
=== Starting 11 ===
4–2–3–1 Formation
