= Oier Sanjurjo =

Spanish footballer (born 1986)

Oier
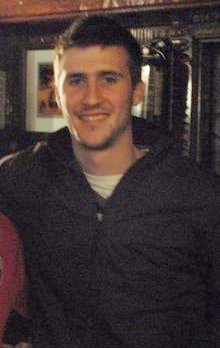
- Oier in 2014

Personal information
- Full name: Oier Sanjurjo Maté
- Date of birth: 25 May 1986 (age 40)
- Place of birth: Estella, Spain
- Height: 1.78 m (5 ft 10 in)
- Positions: Defensive midfielder; defender

Youth career
- Izarra
- Osasuna

Senior career*
Years	Team	Apps	(Gls)
2005–2009	Osasuna B	99	(0)
2008–2022	Osasuna	331	(14)
2011–2012	→ Celta (loan)	33	(0)
2022–2023	AEK Larnaca	28	(2)
Total		491	(16)

International career
2010–2020	Basque Country	5	(0)
- * Club domestic league appearances and goals

Oier Sanjurjo Maté (born 25 May 1986), known simply as Oier, is a Spanish former professional footballer who played as a defender or a defensive midfielder.

He spent the vast majority of his career with Osasuna, making 356 appearances.

== Club career ==
=== Osasuna ===
Oier was born in Estella-Lizarra, Navarre. A product of hometown CD Izarra's youth academy, he completed his development at neighbouring club CA Osasuna. He made his La Liga debut on 24 September 2008 in a game against Deportivo de La Coruña, coming on for Nacho Monreal in the tenth minute of an eventual 0–0 home draw. Although he spent most of the season with the reserves, he still managed a further nine league appearances.

In his first full professional campaign, Oier started the first five matches at right-back as starter César Azpilicueta was away on international duty. He found his chances limited after the latter's return, and was subsequently loaned to RC Celta de Vigo on 11 July 2011.

After being a starter for the Galicians as the season ended in promotion, Oier returned to Osasuna and renewed his contract until 2015. He scored two goals from 28 appearances in 2012–13, but the team returned to Segunda División after a 14-year stay.

Oier extended his contract for three years in June 2015, and in December 2018 this was lengthened to 2020 with a buyout clause of €8 million while the side remained in the second tier. He finished that season as captain of the champions.

After returning to the top flight, Oier earned two new renewals, allowing him to skipper the club during its centenary in 2020. On 31 October that year, in a 3–1 home loss to Atlético Madrid, he made his 300th official appearance for the team but also gave away a penalty by handball.

=== AEK Larnaca ===
Oier moved abroad for the first time at the age of 36, joining AEK Larnaca FC of the Cypriot First Division. On 29 May 2023, he announced his retirement.

== International career ==
Oier was never capped by Spain at any level. He did play for the Basque Country representative team, starting from a friendly against Venezuela in December 2010.

== Career statistics ==
As of match played 22 May 2022

Appearances and goals by club, season and competition
Club	Season	League			National Cup		Other		Total	
Club	Season	Division	Apps	Goals	Apps	Goals	Apps	Goals	Apps	Goals
Osasuna B	2005–06	Segunda División B	24	0	—		—		24	0
Osasuna B	2006–07	Segunda División B	34	0	—		—		34	0
Osasuna B	2007–08	Segunda División B	32	0	—		—		32	0
Osasuna B	2008–09	Segunda División B	9	0	—		—		9	0
Osasuna B	Total		99	0	0	0	0	0	99	0
Osasuna	2006–07	La Liga	0	0	0	0	—		0	0
Osasuna	2007–08	La Liga	0	0	1	0	—		1	0
Osasuna	2008–09	La Liga	10	0	3	0	—		13	0
Osasuna	2009–10	La Liga	11	0	1	0	—		12	0
Osasuna	2010–11	La Liga	3	0	0	0	—		3	0
Osasuna	2012–13	La Liga	31	0	1	0	—		32	0
Osasuna	2013–14	La Liga	28	2	4	0	—		32	2
Osasuna	2014–15	Segunda División	12	1	0	0	—		12	1
Osasuna	2015–16	Segunda División	38	3	1	0	4 (Note: Appearances in La Liga play-offs)	0	43	3
Osasuna	2016–17	La Liga	36	0	2	0	—		38	0
Osasuna	2017–18	Segunda División	39	2	2	0	—		41	2
Osasuna	2018–19	Segunda División	37	3	0	0	—		37	3
Osasuna	2019–20	La Liga	29	2	0	0	—		29	2
Osasuna	2020–21	La Liga	32	0	3	1	—		35	1
Osasuna	2021–22	La Liga	25	1	3	0	—		28	1
Osasuna	Total		331	14	21	1	4	0	356	15
Celta (loan)	2011–12	Segunda División	33	0	1	0	—		34	0
Career total			463	14	22	1	4	0	489	15

== Honours ==
Osasuna

- Segunda División: 2018–19
