= Miguel Díaz (Spanish footballer) =

Spanish footballer (born 1994)

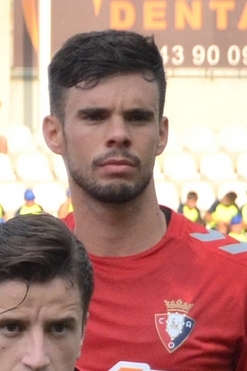
- Díaz with Osasuna in 2018

Personal information
- Full name: Miguel Díaz Montes
- Date of birth: 24 January 1994 (age 32)
- Place of birth: Estella, Spain
- Height: 1.85 m (6 ft 1 in)
- Position: Midfielder

Team information
- Current team: Valle de Egüés
- Number: 16

Youth career
- Izarra
- 2007–2012: Osasuna

Senior career*
Years	Team	Apps	(Gls)
2012–2018	Osasuna B	156	(45)
2017–2019	Osasuna	0	(0)
2018–2019	→ Mirandés (loan)	18	(2)
2019	→ Real Murcia (loan)	15	(2)
2019–2020	Tudelano	20	(3)
2020	Calahorra	5	(0)
2020–2021	Villanovense	13	(1)
2021–2022	Ebro	20	(3)
2022–2023	Racing Rioja	13	(0)
2023–	Valle de Egüés	7	(2)
- * Club domestic league appearances and goals as of 20:25, 22 October 2023 (UTC)

Miguel Díaz Montes (born 24 January 1994) is a Spanish professional footballer who plays for Valle de Egüés as a midfielder.

== Football career ==
Born in Estella, Navarre, Díaz joined CA Osasuna's youth setup in 2007 at the age of 13, from CD Izarra. He made his senior debut with the reserves on 9 September 2012, coming on as a second-half substitute for Luis Ali in a 1–4 Segunda División B away loss against Real Zaragoza B.

Díaz scored his first senior goal on 26 January 2014, in a 3–0 away win against CD Murchante in the Tercera División. He finished the campaign with a career-best 18 goals for the B-side, playing a key unit in their promotion back to the third division.

On 11 September 2016, Díaz scored a hat-trick in a 4–2 home win against Arandina CF. The following 13 June, after the first team's relegation from La Liga, he was definitely promoted to the main squad after extending his contract until 2018.

Díaz made his professional debut on 20 September 2017, starting in a 0–1 away loss against Cádiz CF in the season's Copa del Rey. The following 5 January he extended his contract until 2020, but was demoted to the B-side in the third level.

On 21 August 2018, Díaz was loaned to CD Mirandés of the third division for a year. The deal was terminated on 31 January 2019, and Díaz was instead loaned to Real Murcia.
