= Unai Santos =

Spanish footballer

- Santos playing for Osasuna B in 2025

Personal information
- Full name: Unai Santos Mañeru
- Date of birth: 3 November 2005 (age 20)
- Place of birth: Larraga, Spain
- Height: 1.80 m (5 ft 11 in)
- Position: Centre-back

Team information
- Current team: Osasuna B
- Number: 5

Youth career
- San Miguel
- Osasuna

Senior career*
Years	Team	Apps	(Gls)
2023–2025	Subiza	34	(4)
2024–	Osasuna B	52	(0)
2026–	Osasuna	2	(0)
- * Club domestic league appearances and goals as of 19 September 2026

Unai Santos Mañeru (born 3 November 2005) is a Spanish professional footballer who plays as a centre-back for CA Osasuna.

== Career ==
Born in Larraga, Navarre, Santos joined CA Osasuna's youth categories from hometown side CD San Miguel. He made his senior debut with farm team CD Subiza in the 2023–24 season, in Tercera Federación, before subsequently starting to appear with the reserves in Primera Federación in September 2024.

Santos made his professional – and La Liga – debut on 16 September 2026, starting in a 4–0 away loss to Atlético Madrid.
