= Ion Echaide =

Spanish footballer (born 1988)

Personal information
- Full name: Ion Echaide Sola
- Date of birth: 5 January 1988 (age 38)
- Place of birth: Pamplona, Spain
- Height: 1.79 m (5 ft 10 in)
- Position: Defender

Youth career
- 1999–2006: Osasuna

Senior career*
Years	Team	Apps	(Gls)
2006–2009	Osasuna B	98	(1)
2007–2015	Osasuna	27	(0)
2009	→ Huesca (loan)	13	(1)
2010–2011	→ Huesca (loan)	36	(0)
2013	→ Huesca (loan)	20	(0)
2014	→ Hércules (loan)	18	(0)
2015–2018	Toledo	96	(2)
2018–2019	Ontinyent	6	(0)
2019–2020	Calahorra	33	(0)
2020–2021	Haro	18	(1)
2021–2022	Sant Julià	10	(0)
Total		375	(5)

International career
2004	Spain U16	1	(0)
2004–2005	Spain U17	4	(0)
2007	Spain U19	5	(0)
2008	Spain U21	1	(0)
- * Club domestic league appearances and goals

Ion Echaide Sola (born 5 January 1988 in Pamplona, Navarre) is a Spanish former professional footballer who played as a defender.

== Honours ==
Spain U19

- UEFA European Under-19 Championship: 2007
