= Javier Flaño =

Spanish footballer (born 1984)

Javi Flaño
Personal information
- Full name: Javier Flaño Bezunartea
- Date of birth: 19 August 1984 (age 42)
- Place of birth: Pamplona, Spain
- Height: 1.77 m (5 ft 9 1/2 in)
- Position: Right-back

Youth career
- 1991–2001: Osasuna

Senior career*
Years	Team	Apps	(Gls)
2001–2005	Osasuna B	99	(0)
2005–2009	Osasuna	72	(1)
2009–2011	Numancia	75	(1)
2011–2013	Elche	41	(0)
2013–2014	Mirandés	29	(0)
2014–2018	Osasuna	84	(2)
2018–2019	Logroñés	20	(0)
Total		420	(4)

International career
2003	Spain U20	2	(0)
2006	Spain U21	3	(0)
2005	Spain U23	2	(0)
- * Club domestic league appearances and goals

Javier 'Javi' Flaño Bezunartea (born 19 August 1984) is a Spanish former professional footballer who played as a right-back.

He represented Spain up to under-23 level, and spent most of his career with Osasuna.

== Club career ==
A product of hometown CA Osasuna's youth system, Flaño was born in Pamplona, and he made his debut with the first team in a La Liga 2–1 home win against Villarreal CF on 28 August 2005, going on to finish his first season with 31 games. Aged only 17, he began playing regularly with the reserves in the Segunda División B.

Flaño remained an important fixture with the Navarrese the following campaign. He scored his first goal on 10 December 2006 in a 3–0 home victory over RCD Mallorca, adding eight appearances in the club's semi-final run in the UEFA Cup (plus both legs in the UEFA Champions League third qualifying round against Hamburger SV).

From 2007 onwards, twin brother Miguel became an undisputed starter while Javier was only a fringe player. Released in June 2009, he joined CD Numancia on a free transfer for two years, as the Soria side had just been relegated from the top division; he appeared in 40 Segunda División matches in his second season – 39 starts – in a final comfortable midtable position.

On 22 July 2014, following one-year spells in the second division with Elche CF and CD Mirandés, Flaño returned to his first club, where his brother was still playing. On 7 June 2015, in the last round of the campaign and with the team needing one point to avoid a second consecutive relegation, he scored a last-minute header for a 2–2 draw at CE Sabadell FC.

Flaño started in 37 of his 38 league appearances in 2015–16 to help Osasuna return to the top flight after a two-year absence. In the early stages of the following season, both siblings suffered a complete rupture of the anterior cruciate ligament on their left knee, being sidelined for several months.

Having only totalled ten games in his last two seasons, Flaño left for third-tier UD Logroñés in July 2018.

== Personal life ==
Flaño's twin brother, Miguel, was also a footballer and a defender. Both were developed at Osasuna.

== Honours ==
Elche

- Segunda División: 2012–13

Spain U23

- Mediterranean Games: 2005
