= Yoel Sola =

Spanish footballer

Personal information
- Full name: Yoel Sola Cariñanos
- Date of birth: 10 April 1992 (age 34)
- Place of birth: Pamplona, Spain
- Height: 1.85 m (6 ft 1 in)
- Position: Midfielder

Team information
- Current team: Txantrea

Senior career*
Years	Team	Apps	(Gls)
2011–2012	Txantrea	27	(3)
2012–2013	Peña Sport	31	(7)
2013–2015	Osasuna B	53	(6)
2015	Osasuna	1	(0)
2015–2018	Izarra	81	(11)
2018–2019	Real Unión	39	(4)
2020–2021	Izarra	15	(1)
2021–	Txantrea	102	(7)
- * Club domestic league appearances and goals as of 12 October 2024

Yoel Sola Cariñanos (born 10 April 1992) is a Spanish footballer who plays for Txantrea as a midfielder.

== Club career ==
Born in Pamplona, Navarre, Sola made his senior debuts with Txantrea in 2011 in the Tercera División. In the 2012 summer he moved to Segunda División B club CD Peña Sport, appearing regularly for the club and scoring seven goals.

On 16 February 2013 Sola agreed a deal with CA Osasuna, being effective in June. He was assigned to the reserves in the fourth level.

On 18 March 2015 Sola made his first-team debut, starting in a 0–3 away loss against Deportivo Alavés in the Segunda División. On 21 July he moved to CD Izarra, in the third tier.
