= Liassine Cadamuro =

Association football player (born 1988)

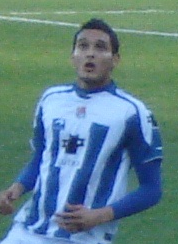
- Cadamuro playing for Real Sociedad B in 2013

Personal information
- Full name: Liassine Cadamuro-Bentaïba
- Date of birth: 5 March 1988 (age 38)
- Place of birth: Toulouse, France
- Height: 1.88 m (6 ft 2 in)
- Position: Defender

Youth career
- 2003–2008: Sochaux

Senior career*
Years	Team	Apps	(Gls)
2008–2011	Real Sociedad B	80	(3)
2011–2015	Real Sociedad	27	(0)
2014	→ Mallorca (loan)	8	(0)
2014–2015	→ Osasuna (loan)	15	(0)
2016–2017	Servette	39	(9)
2017–2018	Nîmes	17	(1)
2018–2019	Gimnàstic	9	(0)
2019	Concordia Chiajna	14	(1)
2020	Volos	5	(0)
2020–2021	Athlético Marseille	3	(1)
2021–2023	Istres	18	(0)
2023–2026	Berre SPC	0	(0)

International career
2012–2017	Algeria	15	(1)
- * Club domestic league appearances and goals as of 25 September 2021

Liassine Cadamuro-Bentaïba (Arabic: لياسين كادامورو بن طيبة; born 5 March 1988) is a former professional footballer. A versatile defender, he can operate as a right back, central defender or left back.

After starting out at Real Sociedad (first and second teams), he went on to represent clubs (other than in Spain) in Switzerland, France, Romania and Greece.

Born in France, Cadamuro featured in the Algeria national team's squads at the 2014 World Cup, and three Africa Cup of Nations tournaments.

== Club career ==
=== Real Sociedad ===
At the age of 15, Cadamuro joined Sochaux's youth system, going on to represent the reserves in three seasons. In summer 2008, he moved to Spain and signed for Real Sociedad.

With the Basques, Cadamuro played another three years with the B side, two in the third division and one in the fourth. He was promoted to the first team for the 2011–12 campaign, following the arrival of countryman Philippe Montanier as team manager. On 10 September 2011, he made his La Liga debut, coming on as a substitute for Xabi Prieto in the 70th minute of a 2–2 home draw against Barcelona.

Cadamuro finished his first season with Real with 19 league appearances (13 starts), helping to a final 12th position. He agreed to a two-year extension on 2 January 2013, extending his contract until 2016.

On 8 January 2014, after having been sparingly played during the first half of the campaign, Cadamuro joined Segunda División club Mallorca on loan until June. On 31 August, he signed with another second-tier side, Osasuna, also on loan.

=== Later career ===
In early February 2016, Cadamuro signed with Servette of the Swiss Promotion League for six months with an option for two further seasons, subject to a medical examination. He made his debut on 5 March against SC Kriens after replacing the injured Tibert Pont late into the first half, but only lasted 19 minutes as he was sent off after receiving his second yellow card of the match.

Cadamuro returned to France in the 2017 off-season, joining Nîmes Olympique from Ligue 2. He scored his first professional goal in that country on 19 September, helping to a 4–0 away defeat of Tours FC.

On 16 August 2018, Cadamuro had a trial at Gimnàstic de Tarragona. He agreed to a two-year contract with the Catalans six days later, returning to Spain and its second division.

On 31 January 2019, Cadamuro moved to Concordia Chiajna in the Romanian Liga I. A year later, he was signed by Super League Greece's Volos.

Returning to France, Cadamuro played in the fifth-tier Championnat National 3 for Athlético Marseille and Istres.

== International career ==
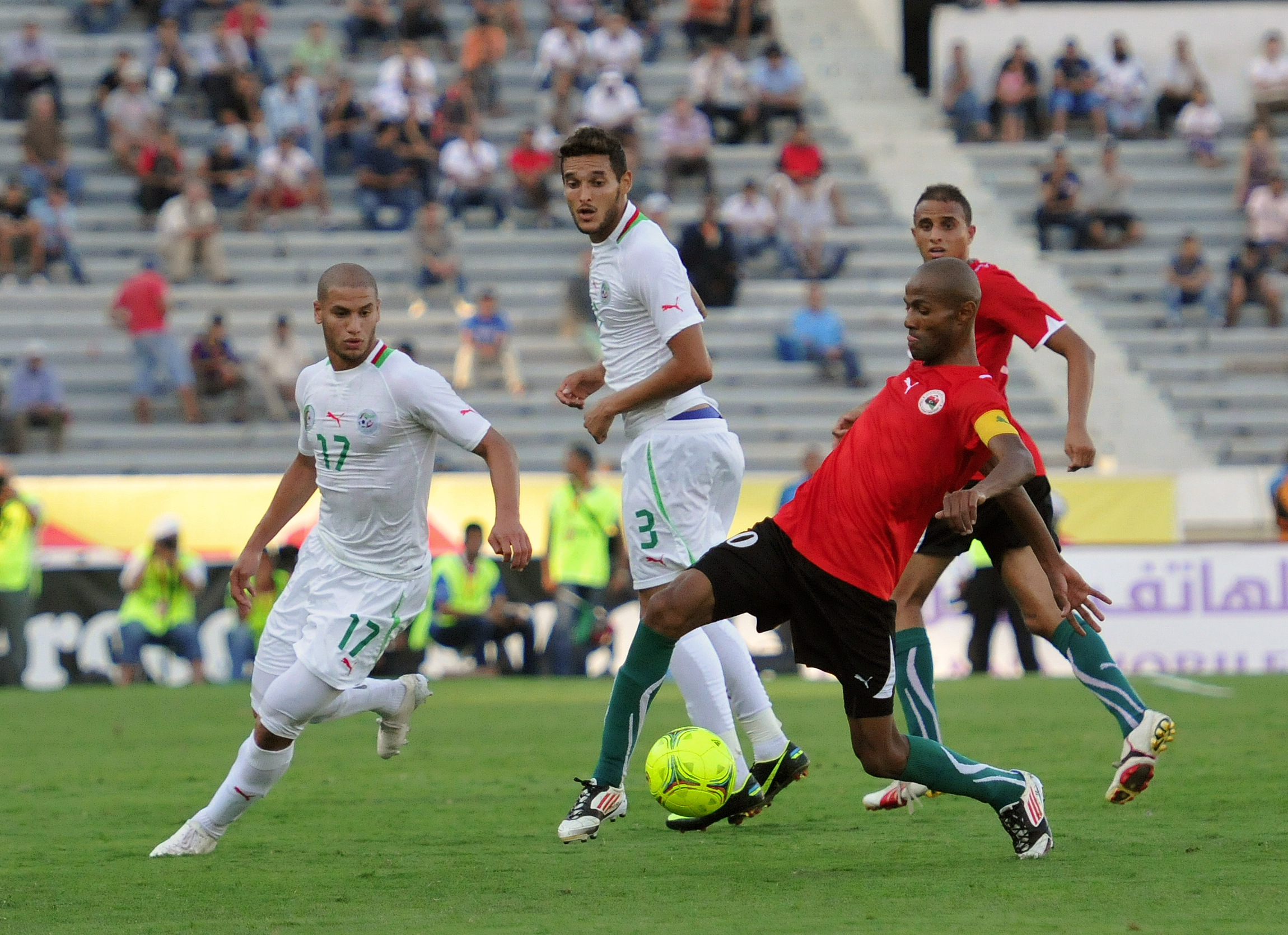
Cadamuro (number 3) playing with Algeria in 2012

On 7 January 2012, Algeria national team coach Vahid Halilhodžić was in the stands to watch Cadamuro in a league match against Osasuna. The following day, in an interview with French website FootMercato.net, the player stated that his intentions had always been to represent Algeria in international competition, despite also having the option to play for France and Italy.

On 10 February 2012, Real Sociedad's website announced that Cadamuro was officially called up by Halilhodžić for the 2013 Africa Cup of Nations qualifier against Gambia. The Algerian Football Federation confirmed the information five days later, and he made his debut on the 29th starting in the 2–1 win.

Cadamuro was selected to the Algeria's list of 23 players for the 2014 FIFA World Cup, but did not play any games. On 26 June, even though on the bench, he managed to receive a yellow card for wasting time by kicking the ball away in the last group stage match against Russia, as the nation held on to the 1–1 draw and reached the last-16.

Cadamuro scored his only international goal on 11 January 2015, in a 1–1 friendly draw against neighbours Tunisia. He was also called up for the continental cup in that year and 2017, the former as an injury replacement for Essaïd Belkalem.

== Personal life ==
Cadamuro was born in Toulouse, France, to an Italian father and an Algerian mother, originally from Tipaza Province. In June 2016, he married fellow footballer Louisa Nécib.

== Career statistics ==
=== Club ===
As of match played 17 July 2018

Appearances and goals by club, season and competition
Club	Season	League			Cup		Continental		Total	
Club	Season	Division	Apps	Goals	Apps	Goals	Apps	Goals	Apps	Goals
Real Sociedad	2011–12	La Liga	19	0	2	0	–		21	0
Real Sociedad	2012–13	La Liga	4	0	0	0	–		4	0
Real Sociedad	2013–14	La Liga	4	0	2	0	2	0	8	0
Real Sociedad	Total		27	0	4	0	2	0	33	0
Mallorca	2013–14	Segunda División	8	0	0	0	–		8	0
Osasuna	2014–15	Segunda División	15	0	1	0	–		16	0
Servette	2016–17	Swiss Challenge League	30	4	0	0	–		30	4
Servette	2017–18	Swiss Challenge League	1	0	0	0	–		1	0
Servette	Total		31	4	0	0	0	0	31	4
Nîmes	2017–18	Ligue 2	17	1	2	0	–		19	1
Career total			98	5	7	0	2	0	107	5

=== International ===
Appearances and goals by national team and year
National team	Year	Apps	Goals
Algeria	2012	3	0
Algeria	2013	2	0
Algeria	2014	3	0
Algeria	2015	1	1
Algeria	2016	2	0
Algeria	2017	4	0
Total		15	1

Score and result list Algeria's goal tally first, score column indicates score after Cadamuro goal.

International goal scored by Liassine Cadamuro
No.	Date	Venue	Opponent	Score	Result	Competition
1	11 January 2015	Olympique de Radès, Radès, Tunisia	Tunisia	1–0	1–1	Friendly
