= Larraga =

Coordinates: 42°34′N 1°51′W

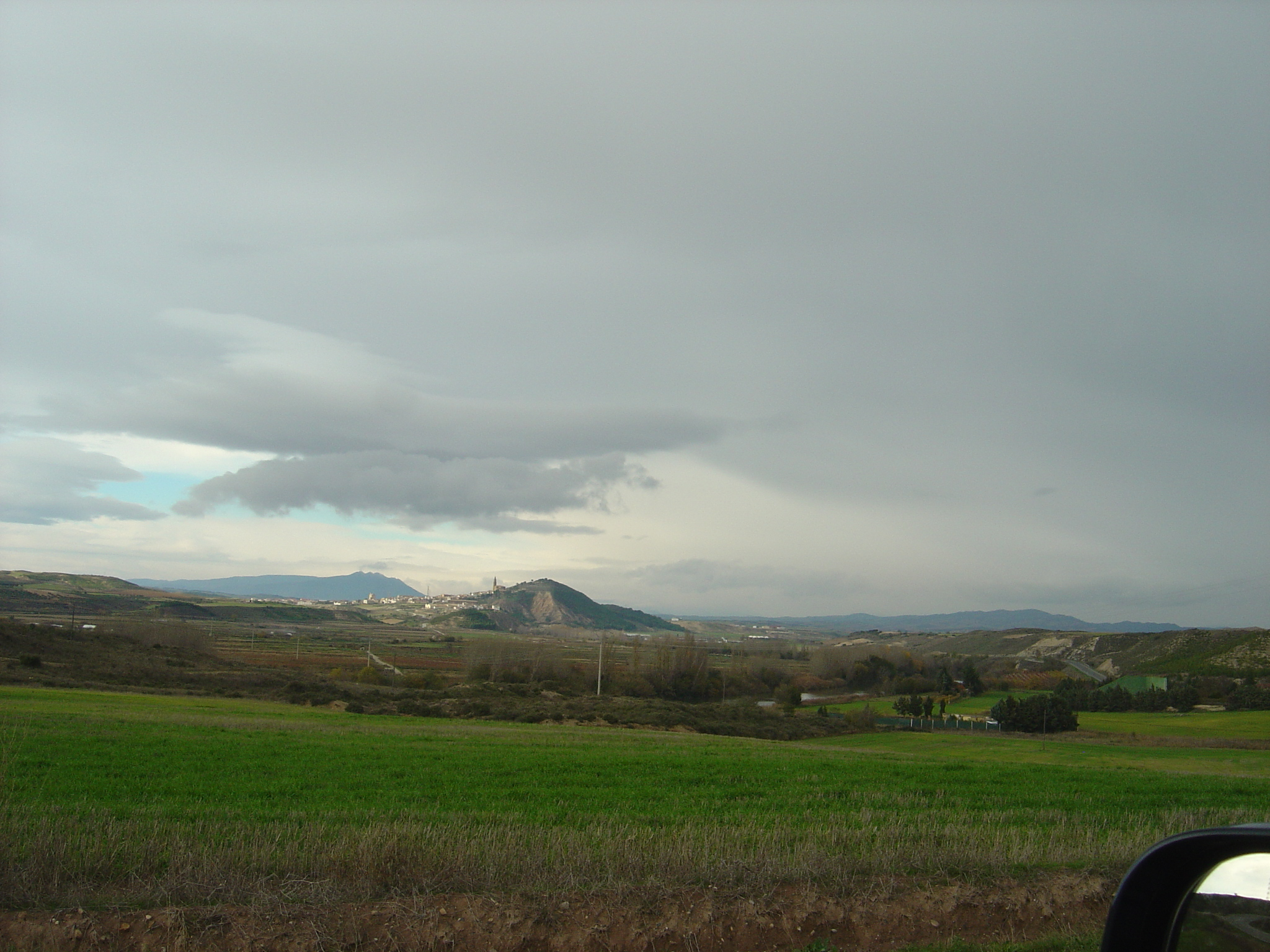
- Mountain view of Larraga in Navarre, Spain

- Coat of arms

- Map of the municipality of Larraga

Larraga is a town and municipality located in the province and autonomous community of Navarre, northern Spain.
