= 2006–07 CA Osasuna season =

Osasuna
2006–07 season
- President: Luis Sabalza
- Head coach: José Ángel Ziganda
- Stadium: El Sadar
- La Liga: 14th
- Copa del Rey: Quarter-finals
- UEFA Champions League: Third qualifying round
- UEFA Cup: Semi-finals
- Top goalscorer: League: Roberto Soldado (11); All: Roberto Soldado (13)

The 2006–07 season was the 76th season in the history of CA Osasuna and the club's seventh consecutive season in the top flight of Spanish football. In addition to the domestic league, Osasuna participated in this season's edition of the Copa del Rey.

== Competitions ==
=== Overall record ===
Competition	First match	Last match	Starting round	Final position	Record							
Competition	First match	Last match	Starting round	Final position	Pld	W	D	L	GF	GA	GD	Win %
La Liga	27 August 2006	17 June 2007	Matchday 1	14th	38	13	7	18	51	49	+2	34.21
Copa del Rey	25 October 2006	28 February 2007	Round of 32	Quarter-finals	6	3	2	1	8	4	+4	50.00
UEFA Champions League	9 August 2006	23 August 2006	Third qualifying round	Third qualifying round	2	0	2	0	1	1	+0	0.00
UEFA Cup	14 September 2006	3 May 2007	First round	Semi-finals	14	7	5	2	17	9	+8	50.00
Total					60	23	16	21	77	63	+14	38.33

Source: Competitions

=== La Liga ===
==== League table ====
Pos	Team	Pld	W	D	L	GF	GA	GD	Pts
12	Mallorca	38	14	7	17	41	47	−6	49 (Note: MLL 1–0 ESP; ESP 3–1 MLL)
13	Deportivo La Coruña	38	12	11	15	32	45	−13	47
14	Osasuna	38	13	7	18	51	49	+2	46
15	Levante	38	10	12	16	37	53	−16	42
16	Real Betis	38	8	16	14	36	49	−13	40 (Note: BET 3–0 ATH; ATH 1–2 BET)

Source: LFP
Rules for classification: 1st points; 2nd head-to-head points; 3rd head-to-head goal difference; 4th head-to-head goals scored; 5th goal difference; 6th number of goals scored; 7th Fair-play points

==== Results summary ====
Overall								Home						Away					
Pld	W	D	L	GF	GA	GD	Pts	W	D	L	GF	GA	GD	W	D	L	GF	GA	GD
32	12	8	12	33	41	−8	44	5	6	5	15	20	−5	7	2	7	18	21	−3

Source: BDFutbol

==== Results by round ====
Round	1	2	3	4	5	6	7	8	9	10	11	12	13	14	15	16	17	18	19	20	21	22	23	24	25	26	27	28	29	30	31	32	33	34	35	36	37	38
Ground	H	A	H	A	A	H	A	H	A	H	A	H	A	H	A	H	A	H	A	A	H	A	H	H	A	H	A	H	A	H	A	H	A	H	A	H	A	H
Result	L	L	W	W	D	L	L	D	L	L	L	W	W	W	W	W	L	W	L	L	D	W	L	L	L	D	W	D	L	D	L	D	L	L	W	W	W	L
Position	19	19	14	10	11	13	14																															

Source: BDFutbol
A = Away; H = Home; W = Win; D = Draw; L = Loss

==== Matches ====
27 August 2006 1	Osasuna	0–2	Getafe	Pamplona
CEST (UTC+2)				Stadium: El Sadar

9 September 2006 2	Barcelona	3–0	Osasuna	Barcelona
CEST (UTC+2)				Stadium: Camp Nou

17 September 2006 3	Osasuna	2–0	Gimnàstic de Tarragona	Pamplona
CEST (UTC+2)				Stadium: El Sadar

24 September 2006 4	Celta Vigo	0–2	Osasuna	Vigo
CEST (UTC+2)				Stadium: Balaídos

1 October 2006 5	Espanyol	0–0	Osasuna	Barcelona
CEST (UTC+2)				Stadium: Estadi Olímpic Lluís Companys

15 October 2006 6	Osasuna	0–1	Racing Santander	Pamplona
CEST (UTC+2)				Stadium: El Sadar

22 October 2006 7	Valencia	1–0	Osasuna	Valencia
CEST (UTC+2)

29 October 2006 8	Osasuna	1–1	Athletic Bilbao	Pamplona
CEST (UTC+2)				Stadium: El Sadar

5 November 2006 9	Sevilla	2–0	Osasuna	Seville
CEST (UTC+2)

12 November 2006 10	Osasuna	1–4	Real Madrid	Pamplona
CEST (UTC+2)				Stadium: El Sadar

26 November 2006 12	Osasuna	4–1	Deportivo La Coruña	Pamplona
CEST (UTC+2)				Stadium: El Sadar

14 January 2007 18	Osasuna	5–1	Real Betis	Pamplona
CEST (UTC+2)				Stadium: El Sadar

20 January 2007 19	Atlético Madrid	1–0	Osasuna	Madrid
CEST (UTC+2)

28 January 2007 20	Getafe	2–0	Osasuna	Getafe
CEST (UTC+2)

4 February 2007 21	Osasuna	0–0	Barcelona	Pamplona
CEST (UTC+2)				Stadium: El Sadar

11 February 2007 22	Gimnàstic de Tarragona	2–3	Osasuna	Tarragona
CEST (UTC+2)

18 February 2007 23	Osasuna	0–1	Celta Vigo	Pamplona
CEST (UTC+2)				Stadium: El Sadar

25 February 2007 24	Osasuna	0–2	Espanyol	Pamplona
CEST (UTC+2)				Stadium: El Sadar

4 March 2007 25	Racing Santander	1–0	Osasuna	Santander
CEST (UTC+2)

11 March 2007 26	Osasuna	1–1	Valencia	Pamplona
CEST (UTC+2)				Stadium: El Sadar

17 March 2007 27	Athletic Bilbao	0–3	Osasuna	Bilbao
CEST (UTC+2)

1 April 2007 28	Osasuna	0–0	Sevilla	Pamplona
CEST (UTC+2)				Stadium: El Sadar

8 April 2007 29	Real Madrid	2–0	Osasuna	Madrid
CEST (UTC+2)

15 April 2007 30	Osasuna	1–1	Recreativo	Pamplona
CEST (UTC+2)				Stadium: El Sadar

22 April 2007 31	Deportivo La Coruña	1–0	Osasuna	A Coruña
CEST (UTC+2)

29 April 2007 32	Osasuna	2–2	Zaragoza	Pamplona
CEST (UTC+2)				Stadium: El Sadar

6 May 2007 33	Mallorca	3–1	Osasuna	Palma
CEST (UTC+2)

13 May 2007 34	Osasuna	1–4	Villarreal	Pamplona
CEST (UTC+2)				Stadium: El Sadar

20 May 2007 35	Levante	1–4	Osasuna	Valencia
CEST (UTC+2)

27 May 2007 36	Osasuna	2–0	Real Sociedad	Pamplona
CEST (UTC+2)				Stadium: El Sadar

9 June 2007 37	Real Betis	0–5	Osasuna	Seville
CEST (UTC+2)

17 June 2007 38	Osasuna	1–2	Atlético Madrid	Pamplona
CEST (UTC+2)				Stadium: El Sadar; Referee: Luis Medina Cantalejo

=== Copa del Rey ===
==== Round of 32 ====
25 October 2006 First leg	Peña Sport	0–0	Osasuna	Tafalla
CEST (UTC+2)				Referee: Alfonso Javier Álvarez Izquierdo

8 November 2006 Second leg	Osasuna	4–0 (4–0 agg.)	Peña Sport	Pamplona
CEST (UTC+2)				Stadium: El Sadar; Referee: Bernardino González Vázquez

==== Round of 16 ====
9 January 2007 First leg	Atlético Madrid	1–1	Osasuna	Madrid
CEST (UTC+2)				Stadium: Vicente Calderón

17 January 2007 Second leg	Osasuna	2–0 (3–1 agg.)	Atlético Madrid	Pamplona
CEST (UTC+2)				Stadium: El Sadar

==== Quarter-finals ====
31 January 2007 First leg	Getafe	3–0	Osasuna	Getafe
CEST (UTC+2)				Stadium: Coliseum Alfonso Pérez

28 February 2007 Second leg	Osasuna	1–0 (1–3 agg.)	Getafe	Pamplona
CEST (UTC+2)				Stadium: El Sadar
