= Asier Riesgo =

Spanish footballer (born 1983)

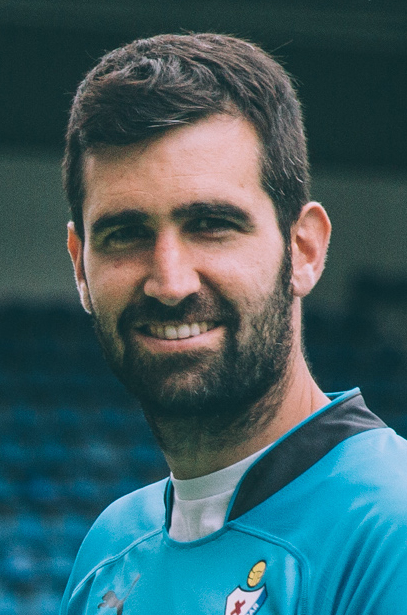
- Riesgo with Eibar in 2016

Personal information
- Full name: Asier Riesgo Unamuno
- Date of birth: 6 October 1983 (age 43)
- Place of birth: Deba, Spain
- Height: 1.85 m (6 ft 1 in)
- Position: Goalkeeper

Youth career
- Amaikak Bat
- Real Sociedad

Senior career*
Years	Team	Apps	(Gls)
2001–2002	Real Sociedad B	16	(0)
2002–2010	Real Sociedad	127	(0)
2002–2004	→ Eibar (loan)	57	(0)
2008–2009	→ Recreativo (loan)	38	(0)
2010–2015	Osasuna	26	(0)
2015–2019	Eibar	65	(0)
2019–2020	Girona	21	(0)
2020–2023	Leganés	65	(0)
Total		415	(0)

International career
2001	Spain U17	2	(0)
2001–2002	Spain U19	2	(0)
2003	Spain U20	10	(0)
2004–2005	Spain U21	9	(0)
2003–2018	Basque Country	11	(0)
- * Club domestic league appearances and goals

Asier Riesgo Unamuno (born 6 October 1983) is a Spanish former professional footballer who played as a goalkeeper.

In a 22-year senior career, he appeared in 185 La Liga games over 11 seasons, for Real Sociedad, Recreativo, Osasuna and Eibar. He added 214 appearances in the Segunda División, where he represented all the clubs but the second.

Riesgo was a youth international for Spain.

== Club career ==
Born in Deba, Gipuzkoa, and a product of Real Sociedad's youth academy, Riesgo made his professional debut with neighbouring SD Eibar in the Segunda División, where he would play for one and a half seasons. In March 2004, he was recalled from his loan due to an injury to first-choice Sander Westerveld.

After Westerveld was waived in the summer, Riesgo became a starter for the Basques, making his La Liga debut on 29 August 2004 in a 1–1 home draw against Levante UD. From the 2006–07 campaign onwards he battled with newly signed Claudio Bravo for starting duties; with the Chilean as the first choice, Real were relegated.

In 2007–08, however, Riesgo played all 42 league matches, although the team did not achieve a top-flight return. In August 2008 he was loaned to Recreativo de Huelva for €350.000, with the club having the option to make the move permanent afterwards for €4.3 million and not having to pay the player's wages.

An undisputed starter throughout the season, Riesgo stopped two penalty kicks on 4 January 2009, helping league strugglers Recre to beat CD Numancia 3–1 at home. On 11 April he became the first to ever deny Lionel Messi a penalty, clawing the Argentine's effort out of the air as he saw his side bow down to a 2–0 defeat at FC Barcelona; the Andalusians eventually dropped down a level, with him appearing in all 38 fixtures.

Riesgo served a trial at Premier League side Tottenham Hotspur in December 2009 as potential cover for injured Carlo Cudicini, lost for the campaign after a motorcycle accident. Upon his return, he found himself third choice at Real Sociedad behind Bravo and Eñaut Zubikarai, totalling only 630 minutes of play as they returned to the top tier after three years.

On 18 June 2010, Riesgo – whose contract with Real Sociedad had expired – signed for Navarrese neighbours CA Osasuna for three years. He acted solely as backup during his tenure with the club, first to Ricardo then Andrés Fernández.

Riesgo returned to Eibar in the 2015 off-season after agreeing to a one-year deal, as the team was now in the top flight. On 2 September 2019, he joined second-division Girona FC for one year as a replacement for Sevilla FC-bound Bono.

On 8 September 2020, Riesgo signed a one-year contract with CD Leganés, recently relegated to division two. On 8 July 2023, he retired from professional football at the age of 39.

== International career ==
Riesgo won the 2002 UEFA European Under-19 Championship with Spain, as backup to Miguel Ángel Moyá. We was a starter, however, for the under-20s as they finished second at the 2003 FIFA World Youth Championship, with Moyá now as second-choice.

On 17 February 2004, Riesgo earned his first cap at under-21 level, in a 2–1 friendly win over Norway.

== Career statistics ==
Appearances and goals by club, season and competition
Club	Season	League			Cup		Continental		Other		Total	
Club	Season	Division	Apps	Goals	Apps	Goals	Apps	Goals	Apps	Goals	Apps	Goals
Real Sociedad B	2001–02	Segunda División B	16	0	—		—		—		16	0
Real Sociedad	2003–04	La Liga	0	0	0	0	0	0	—		0	0
Real Sociedad	2004–05	La Liga	36	0	0	0	—		—		36	0
Real Sociedad	2005–06	La Liga	33	0	0	0	—		—		33	0
Real Sociedad	2006–07	La Liga	9	0	1	0	—		—		10	0
Real Sociedad	2007–08	Segunda División	42	0	1	0	—		—		43	0
Real Sociedad	2009–10	Segunda División	7	0	1	0	—		—		8	0
Real Sociedad	Total		127	0	3	0	0	0	—		130	0
Eibar (loan)	2002–03	Segunda División	33	0	2	0	—		—		35	0
Eibar (loan)	2003–04	Segunda División	24	0	0	0	—		—		24	0
Eibar (loan)	Total		57	0	2	0	—		—		59	0
Recreativo (loan)	2008–09	La Liga	38	0	0	0	—		—		38	0
Osasuna	2010–11	La Liga	0	0	2	0	—		—		2	0
Osasuna	2011–12	La Liga	1	0	4	0	—		—		5	0
Osasuna	2012–13	La Liga	1	0	3	0	—		—		4	0
Osasuna	2013–14	La Liga	2	0	3	0	—		—		5	0
Osasuna	2014–15	Segunda División	22	0	0	0	—		—		22	0
Osasuna	Total		26	0	12	0	—		—		38	0
Eibar	2015–16	La Liga	34	0	0	0	—		—		34	0
Eibar	2016–17	La Liga	16	0	1	0	—		—		17	0
Eibar	2017–18	La Liga	1	0	1	0	—		—		2	0
Eibar	2018–19	La Liga	14	0	2	0	—		—		16	0
Eibar	Total		65	0	4	0	—		—		69	0
Girona	2019–20	Segunda División	21	0	2	0	—		4	0	27	0
Leganés	2020–21	Segunda División	12	0	3	0	—		2	0	17	0
Leganés	2021–22	Segunda División	20	0	1	0	—		—		21	0
Leganés	2022–23	Segunda División	33	0	1	0	—		—		34	0
Leganés	Total		65	0	5	0	—		2	0	72	0
Career total			415	0	28	0	0	0	6	0	449	0

== Honours ==
Real Sociedad

- Segunda División: 2009–10

Spain U19

- UEFA European Under-19 Championship: 2002

Spain U20

- FIFA U-20 World Cup runner-up: 2003
