= José García (footballer, born 1997) =

Spanish footballer

Personal information
- Full name: José Manuel García Maurin
- Date of birth: 13 January 1997 (age 29)
- Place of birth: Pamplona, Spain
- Height: 1.69 m (5 ft 6 1/2 in)
- Position: Winger

Team information
- Current team: Inter Club d'Escaldes
- Number: 14

Youth career
- 2008–2014: Osasuna

Senior career*
Years	Team	Apps	(Gls)
2013–2016	Osasuna	28	(0)
2013–2015	Osasuna B	32	(8)
2016–2018	Alcoyano	57	(5)
2018–2021	Extremadura	27	(0)
2018–2019	→ Salamanca (loan)	19	(0)
2019–2020	→ Atlético Baleares (loan)	9	(0)
2020	→ Pontevedra (loan)	7	(1)
2022	Racing Rioja	14	(1)
2023	Colonia Moscardó	6	(0)
2024	Torrejón	8	(0)
2024–	Inter Club d'Escaldes	8	(0)
- * Club domestic league appearances and goals as of 10 June 2025

José Manuel García Maurin (born 13 January 1997) is a Spanish footballer who plays as a winger for Andorran club Inter Club d'Escaldes.

== Club career ==
=== Osasuna ===
García was born in Pamplona, Navarre. In 2003, the lifelong CA Osasuna supporter appeared in a TV show called El Día Después from Canal+, after a supporting act in a game against Athletic Bilbao, and joined the former's youth system five years later, aged 11.

On 8 November 2013, before even having appeared for the B-side, García made his professional debut, playing the last 24 minutes of a 0–1 La Liga home loss against UD Almería. Aged 16 years and 299 days, he was the third-youngest player to play his first match for the club.

García renewed his contract with Osasuna on 21 July 2015, signing until 2018. On 14 July of the following year, however, he left after failing to agree to new terms.

=== Alcoyano / Extremadura ===
On 3 August 2016, García signed for Segunda División B side CD Alcoyano. On 10 January 2018, he moved to fellow league team Extremadura UD.

García contributed with 15 appearances for Extremadura, as his side achieved promotion to the second division for the first time ever. On 22 August 2018, he joined Salamanca CF in the third division on loan for one year.

On 30 July 2019, García moved to fellow third division side CD Atlético Baleares also in a temporary deal. The following 25 January, he moved to Pontevedra CF on loan for the remainder of the campaign.
