= Jordan Lotiès =

French footballer (born 1984)

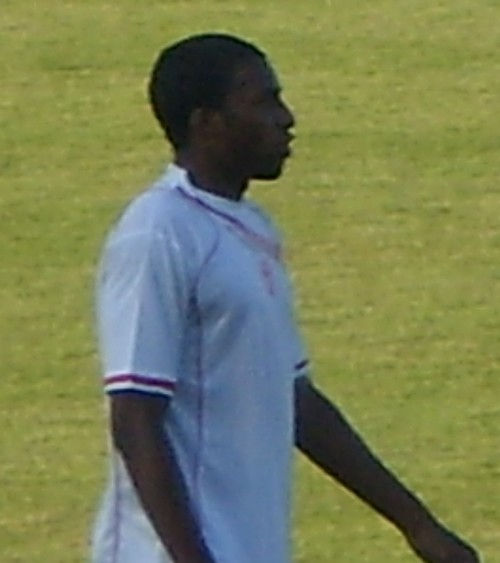
- Lotiès in 2009

Personal information
- Date of birth: 5 August 1984 (age 42)
- Place of birth: Clermont-Ferrand, France
- Height: 1.90 m (6 ft 3 in)
- Position: Centre back

Youth career
- Montferrand
- Grenoble

Senior career*
Years	Team	Apps	(Gls)
2003–2006	Clermont	86	(4)
2006–2009	Dijon	74	(2)
2009–2013	Nancy	97	(2)
2013–2016	Osasuna	44	(0)
2016–2017	Dijon	36	(2)
2017–2019	Eupen	42	(3)
- * Club domestic league appearances and goals as of 18 May 2019

Jordan Lotiès (born 5 August 1984) is a French professional footballer who plays as a central defender.

== Club career ==
Born in Clermont-Ferrand, Lotiès began his senior career with hometown's Clermont Foot, playing three full seasons with the side in Ligue 2. After the club's relegation he joined fellow second-divisioner Dijon FCO.

On 4 June 2009 Lotiès moved to Ligue 1 side AS Nancy. He made his top flight debut on 8 August, starting in a 3–1 success at Valenciennes FC; and scored his first goal for Nancy on 8 December 2012, in a 1–1 home draw against Valenciennes.

On 18 June 2013, free agent Lotiès signed a three-year deal with La Liga strugglers CA Osasuna. He made his debut abroad on 18 August, in a 1–2 home loss against Granada CF.

On 22 January 2016, after being rarely used, Lotiès rescinded his contract with the Navarrese outfit.

== Personal life ==
Lotiès is of Martiniquais descent.
