= Miguel Flaño =

Spanish footballer (born 1984)

Personal information
- Full name: Miguel Flaño Bezunartea
- Date of birth: 19 August 1984 (age 42)
- Place of birth: Pamplona, Spain
- Height: 1.77 m (5 ft 9 1/2 in)
- Position: Centre-back

Team information
- Current team: Guadalajara (manager)

Youth career
- 1991–2001: Osasuna

Senior career*
Years	Team	Apps	(Gls)
2001–2004	Osasuna B	70	(2)
2004–2019	Osasuna	309	(12)
2019	Córdoba	9	(0)
Total		388	(14)

International career
2001	Spain U16	7	(1)
2001	Spain U17	4	(0)
2002	Spain U19	1	(0)
2005	Spain U23	2	(0)

Managerial career
- 2021–2024: Osasuna (youth)
- 2024: Logroñés
- 2026–: Guadalajara
Medal record
Men's Football
Representing Spain
UEFA European Under-16 Championship
Winner	2001 England
- * Club domestic league appearances and goals

Miguel Flaño Bezunartea (born 19 August 1984) is a Spanish former professional footballer who played as a central defender. He is currently manager of Segunda Federación club Guadalajara.

He represented Spain up to under-23 level, and spent the better part of his career with Osasuna, totalling 338 official appearances for the club in 15 years.

== Playing career ==
=== Osasuna ===
Flaño was born in Pamplona. A product of hometown CA Osasuna's youth ranks, he made his first-team debut on 18 September 2004 in a 3–2 La Liga home win against Real Betis, finishing his debut season with seven games. Aged only 17, he began playing regularly with the reserves in the Segunda División B.

Flaño scored his first goal for the Navarrese on 9 June 2007, in the 5–0 away victory over Betis. He added two appearances in the club's semi-final run in the UEFA Cup.

From then on, Flaño became an essential defensive fixture with the side as twin brother Javier, who had been a starter from 2005 to 2007, gradually lost his importance, leaving after the 2008–09 campaign where Miguel netted three times in 34 matches in a narrow escape from relegation. He eventually renewed his contract in August 2009, running until 2013.

Flaño again agreed to an extension at Osasuna on 7 June 2012, now until 2017. In 2015–16, he started in all his 34 league appearances to help the club return to the top flight after a two-year absence.

In the early stages of the following season, both siblings suffered a complete rupture of the anterior cruciate ligament on their left knee, being sidelined for several months. In the following years he was only a backup option, featuring rarely.

=== Córdoba ===
On 28 January 2019, the 34-year-old Flaño agreed to a short-term deal with Segunda División side Córdoba CF after terminating his contract. After retiring later that year, he returned to Osasuna as a scout.

== Coaching career ==
Flaño was appointed manager of Osasuna's youths in 2021. On 24 June 2024, he became head coach of Segunda Federación side UD Logroñés, being dismissed in November after only one win in the last six league matches.

On 8 July 2026, Flaño was announced at CD Guadalajara in the same league.

== Personal life ==
Flaño's twin brother, Javier, was also a footballer and a defender. Both were brought up at Osasuna.

== Honours ==
Osasuna

- Segunda División: 2018–19

Spain U16

- UEFA European Under-16 Championship: 2001

Spain U23

- Mediterranean Games: 2005
