= Raoul Loé =

Cameroonian footballer (born 1989)

Personal information
- Full name: Raoul Cédric Loé
- Date of birth: 31 January 1989 (age 37)
- Place of birth: Courbevoie, France
- Height: 1.92 m (6 ft 4 in)
- Position: Defensive midfielder

Youth career
- Paris Saint-Germain
- CS Brétigny

Senior career*
Years	Team	Apps	(Gls)
2008–2009	Manchego	31	(3)
2009–2011	Ceuta	62	(1)
2011–2012	Osasuna B	28	(0)
2012–2015	Osasuna	83	(5)
2015–2017	Al-Sailiya	37	(3)
2017	Osasuna	7	(0)
2017–2018	CSKA Sofia	25	(2)
2018–2019	Omonia	10	(0)
2020–2022	Shaanxi Chang'an Athletic	65	(2)
2023	Dongguan United	25	(1)
Total		373	(17)

International career
2013–2015	Cameroon	12	(0)
- * Club domestic league appearances and goals

Raoul Cédric Loé (born 31 January 1989) is a former professional footballer who played as a defensive midfielder. Born in France, he represents Cameroon at international level.

== Club career ==
Born in Courbevoie, Paris, Loé moved to Spain in 2008 at the age of 19, and joined amateur team Manchego CF. On 14 August 2009, he signed a contract with AD Ceuta in the third division after impressing in a trial; he played 35 games in his first year, and appeared in both round-of-32 legs against FC Barcelona in the following season's Copa del Rey.

In the 2011 off-season, Loé moved to CA Osasuna, being assigned to their reserves also in the third level. He was first summoned to a La Liga match on 21 December 2011, but remained on the bench against UD Almería.

Loé made his official debut for the Navarrese side on 12 January 2012 against Barcelona in the Copa del Rey (1–2 home loss, 1–6 on aggregate). On 3 March, he played his first league game by appearing the full 90 minutes in a 1–1 draw at RCD Mallorca.

On 1 July 2015, Loé moved to Qatar after agreeing to a contract with Al-Sailiya SC. The free agent returned to the Spanish top flight and Osasuna on 6 February 2017, signing until the end of the season.

On 31 August 2017, Loé joined Bulgarian club PFC CSKA Sofia, being released at the end of the campaign. On 20 June 2018, he signed with AC Omonia from Cyprus.

== International career ==
On 1 June 2013, Loé was called up by Cameroon for the first time, for a friendly with Ukraine. He made his debut on the following day, starting in a 0–0 draw at the Olimpiyskiy National Sports Complex.

== Career statistics ==
=== Club ===
Appearances and goals by club, season and competition
Club	Season	League			National Cup		Continental		Other		Total	
Club	Season	Division	Apps	Goals	Apps	Goals	Apps	Goals	Apps	Goals	Apps	Goals
Manchego	2008–09	Tercera División	31	3	—		—		—		31	3
Ceuta	2009–10	Segunda División B	35	1	2	0	—		—		37	1
Ceuta	2010–11	Segunda División B	27	0	4	0	—		—		31	0
Ceuta	Total		62	1	6	0	—		—		68	1
Osasuna B	2011–12	Segunda División B	28	0	—		—		—		28	0
Osasuna	2011–12	La Liga	8	0	1	0	—		—		9	0
Osasuna	2012–13	La Liga	23	2	1	0	—		—		24	2
Osasuna	2013–14	La Liga	19	0	3	0	—		—		22	0
Osasuna	2014–15	Segunda División	33	3	0	0	—		—		33	3
Osasuna	Total		83	5	5	0	—		—		88	5
Al-Sailiya	2015–16	Qatar Stars League	25	2	0	0	—		—		25	2
Al-Sailiya	2016–17	Qatar Stars League	12	1	0	0	—		—		12	1
Al-Sailiya	Total		37	3	0	0	—		—		37	3
Osasuna	2016–17	La Liga	7	0	0	0	—		—		7	0
CSKA Sofia	2017–18	First League	25	2	5	0	—		—		30	2
Omonia	2018–19	Cypriot First Division	10	0	0	0	—		—		10	0
Shaanxi Chang'an Athletic	2020	China League One	13	0	—		—		—		13	0
Shaanxi Chang'an Athletic	2021	China League One	29	1	2	0	—		—		31	1
Shaanxi Chang'an Athletic	2022	China League One	23	1	0	0	—		—		23	1
Shaanxi Chang'an Athletic	Total		65	2	2	0	—		—		67	2
Dongguan United	2023	China League One	25	1	0	9	—		—		25	1
Career total			373	17	18	0	0	0	0	0	391	16

=== International ===
Appearances and goals by national team and year
National team	Year	Apps	Goals
Cameroon	2013	1	0
Cameroon	2014	5	0
Cameroon	2015	6	0
Total		12	0
