= Sisi (footballer) =

Spanish footballer (born 1986)

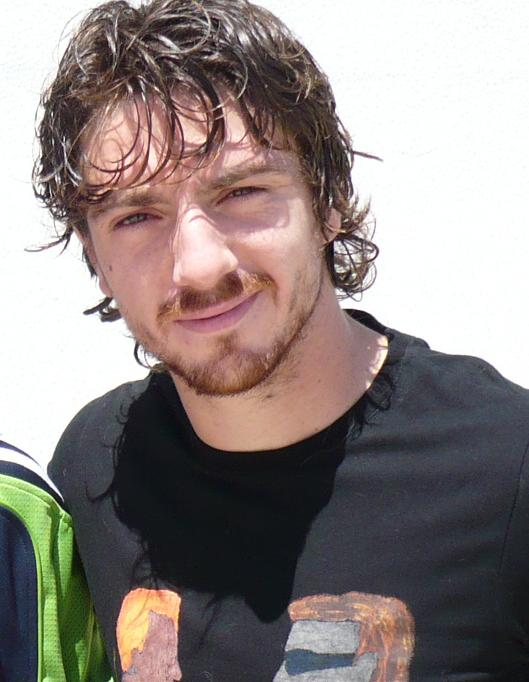
- Sisi in 2009

Personal information
- Full name: Sisinio González Martínez
- Date of birth: 22 April 1986 (age 40)
- Place of birth: Albacete, Spain
- Height: 1.69 m (5 ft 7 in)
- Position: Winger

Team information
- Current team: Valladolid (technical assistant)

Youth career
- 1995–2001: Albacete
- 2001–2003: Valencia

Senior career*
Years	Team	Apps	(Gls)
2003–2008	Valencia B	10	(2)
2004–2006	→ Hércules (loan)	69	(2)
2006–2008	→ Valladolid (loan)	76	(6)
2008–2009	Recreativo	28	(1)
2009–2012	Valladolid	76	(8)
2012–2015	Osasuna	58	(0)
2015	Suwon	17	(0)
2016	Lech Poznań	4	(0)
2016	Veria	11	(0)
2017	Gifu	39	(0)
2018–2019	Tokushima Vortis	38	(1)
2020	Ehime	1	(0)
Total		427	(20)

International career
2001–2002	Spain U16	6	(1)
2002–2003	Spain U17	17	(1)
2005	Spain U19	2	(0)
2007–2009	Spain U21	12	(2)

Managerial career
- 2023: Tokushima Vortis (assistant)
- 2024–2025: Valladolid (youth)
- 2025: Valladolid (caretaker)
Medal record
Representing Spain
Men's football
FIFA U-17 World Cup
Runner-up	2003 Finland
UEFA European Under-17 Championship
Runner-up	2003 Portugal
- * Club domestic league appearances and goals

Sisinio González Martínez (Spanish pronunciation: [siˈsinjo ɣonˈθaleθ maɾˈtineθ]; (Note: In isolation, González is pronounced [ɡonˈθaleθ].) born 22 April 1986), commonly known as Sisi [ˈsisi], is a Spanish former professional footballer who played as a left winger. He is currently technical assistant of Segunda División club Real Valladolid.

== Club career ==
Sisi was born in Albacete, Castilla–La Mancha. A product of Valencia CF's youth system – he arrived aged 15 from his hometown side Albacete Balompié – he first served loan stints in the Segunda División, with Hércules CF and Real Valladolid, with a 2007 top-flight promotion with the latter (he also appeared in the Segunda División B with the former). Whilst playing with Valladolid, the football site Goal.com mentioned him as one of the emergent talents in Spain.

In July 2008, Sisi was sold by Valencia to La Liga club Recreativo de Huelva. Midway through his only season he was diagnosed with hepatitis A, being rendered unavailable for two months; he made his return as a substitute on 4 April 2009, in a 0–1 home loss against Andalusia neighbours Sevilla FC.

On 24 August 2009, after Recre's relegation, Sisi returned to Valladolid, signing a three-year contract. He scored on his debut in a 2–1 win at Real Zaragoza, but was injured through most of the campaign and suffered relegation for the second consecutive time.

Sisi scored a career-best five goals in 2011–12 (from 36 appearances) as the Castile and León side returned to the top flight after two years. In the subsequent off-season he joined CA Osasuna, being hindered by two severe knee injuries during his spell, the last one contracted after only five minutes of the home fixture against FC Barcelona.

In the summer of 2015, aged 29, Sisi moved abroad for the first time, joining Suwon FC in the K League Challenge. In the following transfer window, he reunited with former Osasuna boss Jan Urban at Lech Poznań after agreeing to a six-month deal.

On 25 August 2016, Sisi signed a one-year contract with Veria FC. Until his retirement, he competed exclusively in Japan's J2 League.

== International career ==
In the 2003 FIFA U-17 World Championship, Sisi was a key element for Spain, who finished runners-up to Brazil (1–0). FIFA described him in their technical report as a "...well-developed technique and ball control, fast and agile", as he was listed amongst the nation's Talented Players list.

Two years later, Sisi appeared against France in the 2005 UEFA European Under-19 Championship, as the national team failed to qualify for the final stages in Northern Ireland, losing 1–0 in the elite round. In 2007, he progressed to the under-21s.

== Coaching career ==
On 7 June 2024, having previously worked as Beñat Labaien's assistant at Tokushima Vortis, Sisi returned to Valladolid as manager of the Juvenil B squad. He was promoted to the Juvenil A in February 2025, before becoming a part of Guillermo Almada's staff at the senior first team as a technical assistant.

On 15 December 2025, after Almada expressed his interest in leaving for Real Oviedo and was subsequently suspended by Valladolid, Sisi was appointed caretaker manager of the main squad. On his second-tier debut four days later, they lost 3–0 at SD Eibar.

== Career statistics ==
Appearances and goals by club, season and competition
Club	Season	League			National cup (Note: Includes Copa del Rey, Polish Cup, Greek Cup, Emperor's Cup)		Other		Total	
Club	Season	Division	Apps	Goals	Apps	Goals	Apps	Goals	Apps	Goals
Valencia B	2003–04	Segunda División B	10	2	—		—		10	2
Hércules	2004–05	Segunda División B	34	1	0	0	4 (Note: Appearances in promotion play-offs)	1	38	2
Hércules	2005–06	Segunda División	35	1	0	0	—		35	1
Hércules	Total		69	2	0	0	4	1	73	3
Valladolid	2006–07	Segunda División	40	4	4	0	—		44	4
Valladolid	2007–08	La Liga	36	2	1	0	—		37	2
Valladolid	Total		76	6	5	0	—		81	6
Recreativo	2008–09	La Liga	28	1	0	0	—		28	1
Valladolid	2009–10	La Liga	5	1	0	0	—		5	1
Valladolid	2010–11	Segunda División	35	2	2	0	2	0	39	2
Valladolid	2011–12	Segunda División	36	5	1	0	4	0	41	5
Valladolid	Total		76	8	3	0	6	0	85	8
Osasuna	2012–13	La Liga	11	0	2	0	—		13	0
Osasuna	2013–14	La Liga	9	0	0	0	—		9	0
Osasuna	2014–15	Segunda División	38	0	0	0	—		38	0
Osasuna	Total		58	0	2	0	—		60	0
Suwon	2015	K League Challenge	17	0	0	0	2	0	19	0
Lech Poznań	2015–16	Ekstraklasa	4	0	1	0	—		5	0
Veria	2016–17	Super League Greece	11	0	3	0	—		14	0
Gifu	2017	J2 League	39	0	0	0	—		39	0
Tokushima Vortis	2018	J2 League	37	1	1	0	—		38	1
Tokushima Vortis	2019	J2 League	1	0	0	0	—		1	0
Tokushima Vortis	Total		38	1	1	0	—		39	1
Ehime	2020	J2 League	1	0	0	0	—		1	0
Career total			427	20	15	0	12	1	454	21

== Managerial statistics ==
As of 19 December 2025

Managerial record by team and tenure
Team	Nat	From	To	Record								Ref
Team	Nat	From	To	G	W	D	L	GF	GA	GD	Win %	Ref
Valladolid (caretaker)	(Spain)	15 December 2025	23 December 2025	1	0	0	1	0	3	−3	0.00	
Career total				1	0	0	1	0	3	−3	0.00	—

== Honours ==
Valladolid

- Segunda División: 2006–07
