= Lolo (footballer, born 1984) =

Spanish footballer

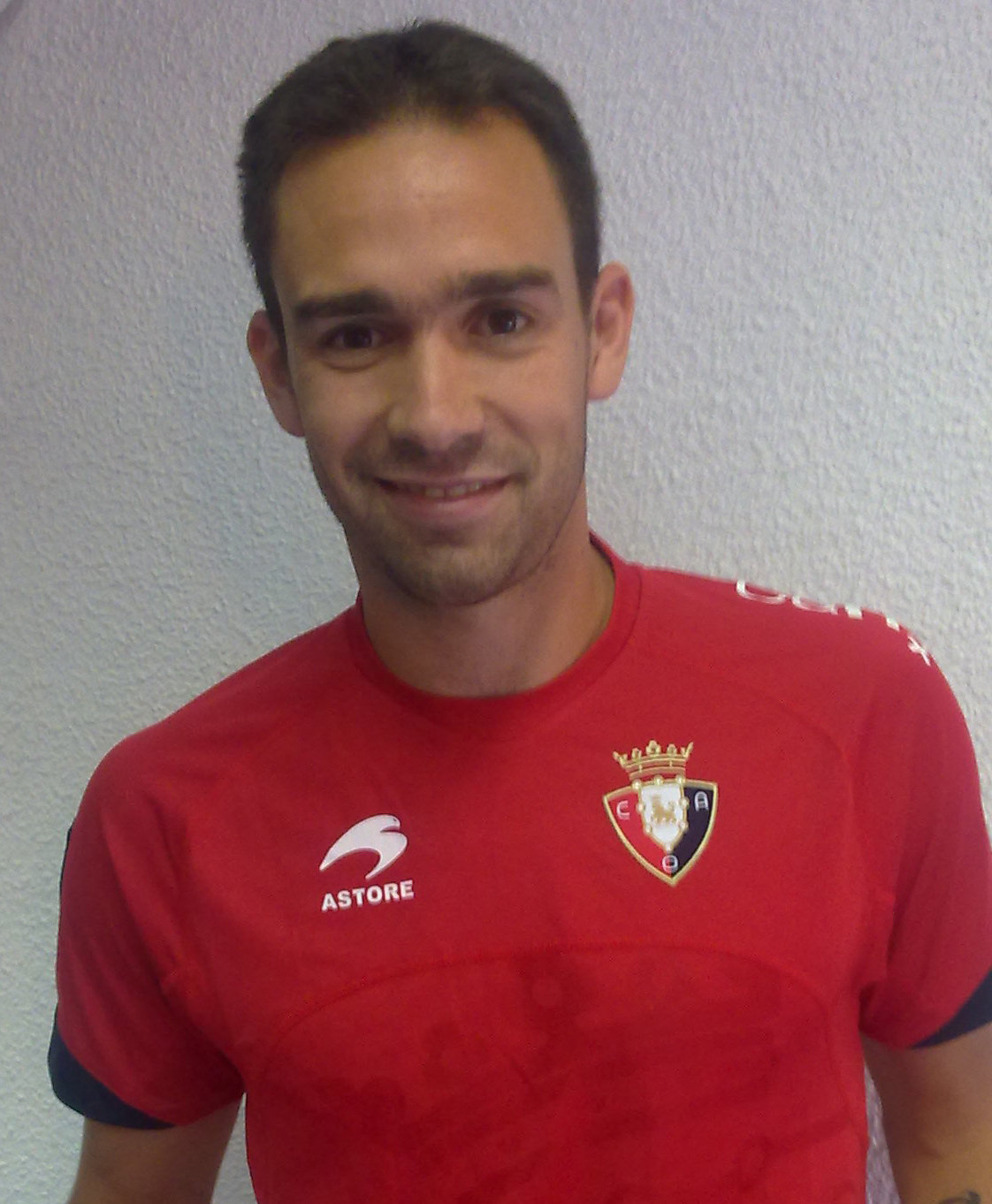
- Lolo being presented at Osasuna

Personal information
- Full name: Manuel Jesús Ortiz Toribio
- Date of birth: 22 August 1984 (age 42)
- Place of birth: Huelva, Spain
- Height: 1.82 m (6 ft 0 in)
- Positions: Centre-back; defensive midfielder

Youth career
- 1999–2002: Sevilla

Senior career*
Years	Team	Apps	(Gls)
2002–2008	Sevilla B	177	(11)
2008–2010	Sevilla	23	(1)
2008–2009	→ Málaga (loan)	26	(4)
2010–2014	Osasuna	98	(4)
2014–2015	Zaragoza	20	(1)
2015–2016	Elche	38	(0)
2017	Hércules	12	(0)
2018	Pune City	4	(0)
Total		398	(21)
- * Club domestic league appearances and goals

Manuel Jesús Ortiz Toribio (born 22 August 1984), known as Lolo, is a Spanish former professional footballer. A versatile defensive unit, he could play as both a central defender or defensive midfielder.

== Club career ==
Born in Huelva, Lolo was a product of Sevilla FC's youth system. In the 2002–03 season he started playing as a senior with their reserves in the Segunda División B, scoring a decisive goal against Burgos CF which led to a promotion to Segunda División in 2007.

Lolo made his La Liga debut the following campaign, appearing in two matches in March 2008, the first being on the 1st in a 2–1 away loss to Deportivo de La Coruña. Earlier, in December, he had made his first appearance in the UEFA Champions League, playing the entire match in a 3–0 group stage victory at SK Slavia Prague. However, he spent the majority of the season with the reserves, being a defensive stalwart for the Andalusians whom retained their league status.

Lolo was loaned to neighbours Málaga CF for 2008–09, spending most of the season as defensive midfielder and scoring home deciders against Real Valladolid (2–1) and Sporting de Gijón (1–0). In October 2009, already established in Sevilla's first team, he signed a new contract until June 2011. He scored his first goal as a Sevillista on 10 April 2010, in the 84th minute of a 2–1 win at former club Málaga.

Having been deemed surplus to requirements at Sevilla, Lolo joined fellow top-flight side CA Osasuna on a four-year deal, in late August 2010. In his debut campaign, in which the Navarrese narrowly avoided relegation, he was used mainly as a central defender while also starting regularly, and also contributed goals against Hércules CF (3–0, at home) and RCD Espanyol (4–0, also at home).

On 19 January 2018, following stints in his country with Real Zaragoza and Elche CF (second tier) and Hércules (third), 33-year-old Lolo moved abroad for the first time in his career with Indian Super League club FC Pune City. He retired later that year.

In 2021, Lolo joined Bodø-based IK Junkeren's coaching staff, with his compatriot José Isidoro being in charge of the academy and his wife Tamara Carrillo also working there.

== Career statistics ==
Appearances and goals by club, season and competition
Club	Season	League			Cup		Other		Total	
Club	Season	Division	Apps	Goals	Apps	Goals	Apps	Goals	Apps	Goals
Sevilla B	2001–02	Segunda División B	1	0	—		—		1	0
Sevilla B	2002–03	Segunda División B	25	1	—		—		25	1
Sevilla B	2003–04	Segunda División B	20	3	—		4 (Note: Appearances in promotion play-offs)	0	24	3
Sevilla B	2004–05	Segunda División B	35	2	—		2	0	37	2
Sevilla B	2005–06	Segunda División B	26	1	—		4	0	30	1
Sevilla B	2006–07	Segunda División B	35	3	—		4	1	39	4
Sevilla B	2007–08	Segunda División	35	1	—		—		35	1
Sevilla B	Total		177	11	—		14	1	191	12
Sevilla	2005–06	La Liga	0	0	0	0	—		0	0
Sevilla	2006–07	La Liga	0	0	0	0	—		0	0
Sevilla	2007–08	La Liga	2	0	0	0	1 (Note: Appearances in UEFA Champions League)	0	3	0
Sevilla	2009–10	La Liga	21	1	7	0	4	0	32	1
Sevilla	Total		23	1	7	0	5	0	35	1
Málaga (loan)	2008–09	La Liga	26	4	2	0	—		28	4
Osasuna	2010–11	La Liga	27	2	2	0	—		29	2
Osasuna	2011–12	La Liga	28	1	4	0	—		32	1
Osasuna	2012–13	La Liga	22	1	3	0	—		25	1
Osasuna	2013–14	La Liga	21	0	0	0	—		21	0
Osasuna	Total		98	4	9	0	—		107	4
Zaragoza	2014–15	Segunda División	20	1	1	0	1	0	22	1
Elche	2015–16	Segunda División	31	0	0	0	—		31	0
Elche	2016–17	Segunda División	7	0	1	0	—		8	0
Elche	Total		38	0	1	0	—		39	0
Hércules	2016–17	Segunda División B	12	0	0	0	—		12	0
Pune City	2017–18 (Note: Appearance in Super Cup)	Indian Super League	4	0	1	0	—		5	0
Career total			398	21	21	0	20	1	439	22

== Honours ==
Sevilla B

- Segunda División B: 2006–07

Sevilla

- Copa del Rey: 2009–10
