= Emiliano Armenteros =

Argentine footballer (born 1986)

Personal information
- Full name: Emiliano Daniel Armenteros
- Date of birth: 18 January 1986 (age 40)
- Place of birth: Monte Grande, Argentina
- Height: 1.79 m (5 ft 10 in)
- Position: Midfielder

Team information
- Current team: Atlético Pinto

Youth career
- 2000–2003: Banfield

Senior career*
Years	Team	Apps	(Gls)
2003–2005	Banfield	17	(2)
2005–2007	Independiente	54	(6)
2007–2009	Sevilla B	69	(11)
2008–2012	Sevilla	17	(1)
2009–2010	→ Xerez (loan)	25	(3)
2010–2011	→ Rayo Vallecano (loan)	37	(20)
2012	→ Rayo Vallecano (loan)	13	(2)
2012–2014	Osasuna	62	(8)
2014–2017	Chiapas	54	(12)
2016–2017	→ Santos Laguna (loan)	16	(0)
2017–2018	Santos Laguna	11	(0)
2018	Rayo Vallecano	11	(0)
2018–2019	Ibiza	18	(1)
2020–	Atlético Pinto	1	(0)

International career
2005	Argentina U20	11	(1)
- * Club domestic league appearances and goals as of 8 November 2020

Emiliano Daniel Armenteros (born 18 January 1986) is an Argentine former professional footballer who played for Spanish club CA Pinto as a left midfielder.

== Club career ==
=== Argentina ===
Born in Monte Grande, Buenos Aires, Armenteros started playing professionally for Club Atlético Banfield, making his Primera División debut at only 17. In 2005, he was sold to Club Atlético Independiente for roughly US$1 million.

During his two-season spell with Los Diablos Rojos, Armenteros was an undisputed starter in spite of his young age.

=== Spain ===
In 2007, Armenteros joined Sevilla FC on loan, with the La Liga club having an option to buy for €2 million at the end of the season. He began his career at the Ramón Sánchez Pizjuán Stadium almost exclusively with the reserves, newly promoted to the Segunda División, only missing two league games in 42 in his first year and scoring seven goals as the team retained their divisional status.

Armenteros made his Spanish top flight debut on 19 October 2008, playing 15 minutes in a 1–0 away win against UD Almería. He collected a further three substitute appearances over the course of the campaign, netting in a 2–0 success at CD Numancia.

On 4 August 2009, Armenteros moved to neighbouring Xerez CD on loan. On 4 October, he scored the club's first-ever top division goal in a 1–1 home draw against Málaga CF, and welcomed his first child, Sofía, on the 27th; eventually, the team were relegated back.

On 15 July 2010, still on loan, Armenteros signed with second division club Rayo Vallecano. He netted a career-best 20 goals – including a hat-trick on 20 November 2010 in a 3–1 home win against SD Ponferradina– as the Madrid outskirts team returned to the top level after eight years.

On 6 July 2012, Armenteros joined CA Osasuna on a two-year contract. He scored three times in his first season, helping to a 16th-place finish in the top tier.

=== Later years ===
Starting in 2014–15, Armenteros spent three-and-a-half seasons in the Liga MX with Chiapas F.C. and Santos Laguna. In the last days of the 2018 January transfer window, the 32-year-old returned to Spain and Rayo in a five-month deal.

== International career ==
Armenteros was part of the Argentina under-20 squad that won the 2005 FIFA World Youth Championship held in the Netherlands, appearing in five out of seven matches.

== Honours ==
Rayo Vallecano

- Segunda División: 2017–18

Argentina

- FIFA U-20 World Cup: 2005
