= Marc Bertrán =

Spanish footballer

Personal information
- Full name: Marc Bertrán Vilanova
- Date of birth: 22 May 1982 (age 44)
- Place of birth: La Pobla de Segur, Spain
- Height: 1.81 m (5 ft 11 in)
- Position: Right-back

Youth career
- Pobla de Segur
- 1998–2001: Espanyol

Senior career*
Years	Team	Apps	(Gls)
2001–2004	Espanyol B	52	(2)
2002–2005	Espanyol	17	(0)
2005	→ Córdoba (loan)	22	(1)
2005	Cádiz	1	(0)
2006	Lorca Deportiva	19	(1)
2006–2011	Tenerife	161	(4)
2011–2014	Osasuna	80	(0)
2014–2015	Recreativo	0	(0)
2015	Leganés	11	(1)
2015–2016	Zaragoza	11	(0)
Total		374	(9)

International career
2003	Spain U21	1	(0)
- * Club domestic league appearances and goals

Marc Bertrán Vilanova (born 22 May 1982) is a Spanish former professional footballer who played as a right-back.

He appeared in 119 La Liga games over nine seasons, in representation of Espanyol, Cádiz, Tenerife and Osasuna. He added 203 and six goals in the Segunda División, with five clubs.

== Club career ==
Born in La Pobla de Segur, Lleida, Catalonia, Bertrán began playing football for his local club as future FC Barcelona's Carles Puyol before him. He finished his development in RCD Espanyol's academy and played once for the first team in 2001–02, going on to make a further 16 La Liga appearances over the next two seasons; in the second part of 2004–05, he served a relegation-ending loan spell at Córdoba CF in the Segunda División.

Bertrán split 2005–06 in the two major tiers after being released in summer 2005, with Cádiz CF and Lorca Deportiva CF. Subsequently, he moved to CD Tenerife, being a defensive cornerstone from the beginning; in his third year, he helped the Canary Islands side to return to the top flight after seven years, starting in all of his 35 league appearances and scoring twice.

In 2009–10, as Tenerife were relegated in the last matchday, Bertrán appeared in 21 matches, netting in the penultimate round, a 2–2 home draw against UD Almería. Having started and finished the campaign in the starting eleven, however, he also missed almost four months due to a dangerous challenge from Real Madrid's Royston Drenthe during a 3–0 away loss in late September.

Bertrán was again first-choice for Tenerife in the 2010–11 season, but the team suffered another relegation. In early June 2011, the 29-year-old agreed to a deal at CA Osasuna, thus returning to the main division.

Bertrán retired aged 34, following second-tier spells with CD Leganés (after not being registered by Recreativo de Huelva) and Real Zaragoza.

== International career ==
In his only cap for the Spain under-21 side, on 10 October 2003, Bertrán played the entire 2–0 away victory over Armenia for the 2004 UEFA European Championship qualifiers.
