= CA Osasuna B =

Spanish football club

Osasuna B
- Full name: Club Atlético Osasuna "B"
- Nickname: Las Rojillos (The Reds) / Promesas
- Founded: 1962; 64 years ago
- Stadium: Tajonar
- Capacity: 4,500
- President: Luis Sabalza
- Head coach: Miguel Ángel Sierra
- League: Segunda Federación – Group 2
- 2025–26: Primera Federación – Group 1, 19th of 20 (relegated)
- Website: www.osasuna.es/dev/
Home colours	Away colours	Third colours

Club Atlético Osasuna B, usually known as Osasuna Promesas is the reserve team of CA Osasuna, a Spanish football club based in Pamplona, in the autonomous community of Navarre. Founded in 1962, currently plays in Primera Federación – Group 2, holding home matches at the Tajonar Facilities with 4,500-seat capacity.

== History ==
Osasuna B was founded in 1962 as Osasuna Promesas, being renamed in 1991. It first reached the third division in the 1982–83 season, then again in 1987, the latter spell eventually lasting more than two decades.

From 1994 until 2000 Osasuna B was not eligible for promotion, as the main side was playing in the second level.

A change in the club structure from 2016 meant that an affiliate club, CD Iruña of the Tercera División became part of the Osasuna structure. The Iruña team had to play at least one division below Osasuna B, which soon had a consequence when the latter were relegated from their 2017–18 Segunda División B group and Iruña, who had maintained their status for 15 seasons, were administratively sent down to the Primera Autonómica de Navarra.

In the 2018–19 season, Osasuna B won Group 15 of the Tercera División. After the win over Cádiz B in the promotional play-offs, the team were promoted back to Segunda División B for the 2019–20 season.

In the summer of 2020, the Osasuna affiliation with Iruña ended (though they would remain a local partner club) and a new arrangement was made with CD Subiza to act as the B-team's feeder.

== Season to season ==
Season	Tier	Division	Place	Copa del Rey
1964–65	5	2ª Reg.	1st	
1965–66	4	1ª Reg.	3rd	
1966–67	4	1ª Reg.	2nd	
1967–68	4	1ª Reg.	7th	
1968–69	4	1ª Reg.	9th	
1969–70	4	1ª Reg.	12th	
1970–71	4	1ª Reg.	17th	
1971–72	4	1ª Reg.	2nd	
1972–73	3	3ª	10th	
1973–74	3	3ª	20th	
1974–75	4	Reg. Pref.	9th	
1975–76	4	Reg. Pref.	5th	
1976–77	4	Reg. Pref.	7th	
1977–78	5	Reg. Pref.	4th	
1978–79	5	Reg. Pref.	5th	
1979–80	5	Reg. Pref.	2nd	
1980–81	4	3ª	10th	
1981–82	4	3ª	2nd	
1982–83	3	2ª B	13th	
1983–84	3	2ª B	11th	

Season	Tier	Division	Place	Copa del Rey
1984–85	3	2ª B	18th	
1985–86	4	3ª	1st	
1986–87	4	3ª	1st	Second round
1987–88	3	2ª B	11th	Second round
1988–89	3	2ª B	7th	First round
1989–90	3	2ª B	2nd	
1990–91	3	2ª B	3rd	DNP
1991–92	3	2ª B	10th	DNP
1992–93	3	2ª B	5th	DNP
1993–94	3	2ª B	8th	DNP
1994–95	3	2ª B	6th	DNP
1995–96	3	2ª B	2nd	DNP
1996–97	3	2ª B	14th	DNP
1997–98	3	2ª B	11th	DNP
1998–99	3	2ª B	10th	DNP
1999–2000	3	2ª B	15th	DNP
2000–01	3	2ª B	8th	DNP
2001–02	3	2ª B	11th	DNP
2002–03	3	2ª B	9th	DNP
2003–04	3	2ª B	13th	DNP

Season	Tier	Division	Place
2004–05	3	2ª B	15th
2005–06	3	2ª B	9th
2006–07	3	2ª B	15th
2007–08	3	2ª B	16th
2008–09	3	2ª B	13th
2009–10	3	2ª B	8th
2010–11	3	2ª B	7th
2011–12	3	2ª B	13th
2012–13	3	2ª B	19th
2013–14	4	3ª	4th
2014–15	4	3ª	4th
2015–16	4	3ª	1st
2016–17	3	2ª B	11th
2017–18	3	2ª B	19th
2018–19	4	3ª	1st
2019–20	3	2ª B	7th
2020–21	3	2ª B	5th
2021–22	4	2ª RFEF	1st
2022–23	3	1ª Fed.	7th
2023–24	3	1ª Fed.	12th

Season	Tier	Division	Place
2024–25	3	1ª Fed.	14th
2025–26	3	1ª Fed.	19th
2026–27	4	2ª Fed.	

- 4 seasons in Primera Federación
- 33 seasons in Segunda División B
- 2 season in Segunda Federación/Segunda División RFEF
- 10 seasons in Tercera División
- 14 seasons in Categorías Regionales

== Honours ==
- Tercera División (3): (Note: Fourth tier) 1985–86, (Note: Not promoted in play-offs) 1986–87, (Note: Promoted directly) 2015–16 (Note: Promoted in play-offs)

== Current squad ==
As of 7 September 2026

Note: Flags indicate national team as defined under FIFA eligibility rules; some limited exceptions apply. Players may hold more than one non-FIFA nationality.

No.	Pos.	Nation	Player
1	GK	ESP	Rafa Fernández
2	DF	ESP	Mikel Ansó
3	DF	ESP	Álex Jiménez
4	DF	ESP	Ander Alonso
5	DF	ESP	Unai Santos
6	MF	ESP	Xabi Garin
7	FW	ESP	Aly Doumbia
8	MF	ESP	Ibai Arrasate
9	FW	ESP	Asier Bonel
10	MF	ESP	Bruno Pérez

No.	Pos.	Nation	Player
11	MF	ESP	Lucas Ibañez
14	MF	ESP	Yoel Villamayor
16	MF	ESP	Hodei Iriarte
17	FW	ESP	Asier Arocena
18	MF	ESP	Aimar Bonel
19	FW	ESP	Lucas Díaz
20	DF	ESP	Iker Lizaso
21	DF	ESP	Kepa Sarango
22	DF	ESP	Asier Larrión
23	FW	ESP	Jaime Josa

=== Reserve team ===
Note: Flags indicate national team as defined under FIFA eligibility rules; some limited exceptions apply. Players may hold more than one non-FIFA nationality.

No.	Pos.	Nation	Player
27	DF	ESP	Iñigo Iturria
28	MF	ESP	Xabier Roldan
29	MF	ESP	Iker Zalduendo

No.	Pos.	Nation	Player
31	GK	ESP	Mikel Bermejo
35	GK	ESP	Xabi Sagaseta
36	DF	ESP	Aitor Iguaz
