= 2017–18 SD Huesca season =

SD Huesca
2017–18 season
- Chairman: Agustín Lasaosa
- Manager: Rubi
- Stadium: El Alcoraz
- Segunda División: 2nd (promoted)
- Copa del Rey: 2nd Round
Home colours	Away colours	Third colours

During the 2017–18 season, SD Huesca are participating in the Spanish Segunda División, and the Copa del Rey. The team were promoted to La Liga for the first time in club history after finishing as runner-up of the second division.

== Squad ==
As of 19 August 2017

Note: Flags indicate national team as defined under FIFA eligibility rules; some limited exceptions apply. Players may hold more than one non-FIFA nationality.

No.	Pos.	Nation	Player
1	GK	ESP	Álex Remiro (on loan from Athletic Bilbao)
3	DF	ESP	Jair Amador
4	DF	ESP	Carlos David (vice-captain)
5	MF	ESP	Juan Aguilera
6	MF	ESP	Luso Delgado
7	FW	ESP	David Ferreiro
8	MF	ESP	Gonzalo Melero
9	MF	COL	Juan Camilo Hernández (on loan from Watford)
10	MF	ESP	Juanjo Camacho (captain)
11	FW	ESP	Álex Gallar
12	DF	ESP	Rulo
13	GK	ESP	Antonio Valera

No.	Pos.	Nation	Player
14	DF	ESP	Jorge Pulido
15	DF	GEQ	Carlos Akapo
16	MF	ARG	Ezequiel Ávila (on loan from San Lorenzo)
17	MF	ESP	Álvaro Vadillo
18	FW	ESP	Kilian Grant
19	MF	VEN	Alexander González
20	DF	SRB	Rajko Brežančić
21	DF	ESP	Íñigo López (4th captain)
22	MF	ESP	Lluís Sastre
23	FW	ARG	Ezequiel Rescaldani (on loan from Atlético Nacional)
24	DF	ESP	Nagore (3rd captain)
25	GK	ESP	Ander Bardají

== Transfers ==
=== In ===
Date	Player	From	Type	Fee	Ref
30 June 2017	(France) Aly Coulibaly	(Spain) Badalona	Loan return	Free	
30 June 2017	(Montenegro) Boris Cmiljanić	(Spain) Levante B	Loan return	Free	
30 June 2017	(Spain) Álex García	(Spain) Atlético Madrid B	Loan return	Free	
7 July 2017	(Spain) Rulo	(Spain) Linense	Transfer	Free	
7 July 2017	(Spain) Jorge Pulido	(Belgium) Sint-Truiden	Transfer	Undisclosed	
8 July 2017	(Colombia) Cucho Hernández	(England) Watford	Loan	Free	
8 July 2017	(Spain) Antonio Valera	(Spain) Córdoba	Transfer	Free	
10 July 2017	(Spain) Álex Gallar	(Spain) Cultural Leonesa	Transfer	€400K	
14 July 2017	(Spain) Luso	(Spain) Córdoba	Transfer	Free	
21 July 2017	(Spain) Álex Remiro	(Spain) Athletic Bilbao	Loan	Free	
24 July 2017	(Spain) Ander Bardají	(Spain) Real Sociedad	Transfer	Free	
31 July 2017	(Argentina) Ezequiel Rescaldani	(Colombia) Atlético Nacional	Loan	Free	
1 August 2017	(Argentina) Ezequiel Ávila	(Argentina) San Lorenzo	Loan	Free	

=== Out ===
Date	Player	To	Type	Fee	Ref
30 June 2017	(Brazil) Vinícius Araújo	(Spain) Valencia	Loan return	Free	
1 July 2017	(Spain) Queco Piña	TBD		Free	
6 July 2017	(Spain) Borja Lázaro	(Spain) Alcorcón	Transfer	Undisclosed	
8 July 2017	(Spain) César Soriano	(Spain) Alcorcón	Transfer	Free	
10 July 2017	(Spain) Samuel Sáiz	(England) Leeds United	Transfer	€3.5M	
12 July 2017	(Spain) Sergio Herrera	(Spain) Osasuna	Transfer	€300K	
12 July 2017	(France) Franck-Yves Bambock	(Netherlands) Sparta Rotterdam	Transfer	Undisclosed	
26 July 2017	(France) Aly Coulibaly	(Spain) Badalona	Transfer	Free	
26 July 2017	(Spain) Javi Jiménez	TBD		Free	

== Competitions ==
=== Overall ===
Competition	Final position
Segunda División	-
Copa del Rey	-

=== Liga ===
==== League table ====
Pos	Team	Pld	W	D	L	GF	GA	GD	Pts	Promotion, qualification or relegation
1	Rayo Vallecano (C, P)	42	21	13	8	67	48	+19	76	Promotion to La Liga
2	Huesca (P)	42	21	12	9	61	40	+21	75	Promotion to La Liga
3	Zaragoza	42	20	11	11	57	44	+13	71 (Note: Zaragoza finished ahead of Sporting Gijón on head-to-head points: Sporting Gijón 0–1 Zaragoza, Zaragoza 2–1 Sporting Gijón)	Qualification for promotion play-offs
4	Sporting Gijón	42	21	8	13	60	40	+20	71	Qualification for promotion play-offs
5	Valladolid (O, P)	42	19	10	13	69	55	+14	67	Qualification for promotion play-offs

Source: La Liga
Rules for classification: 1) points; 2) head-to-head points; 3) head-to-head goal difference; 4) goal difference; 5) number of goals scored
(C) Champions; (O) Play-off winners; (P) Promoted

==== Matches ====
19 August 2017 Match 1	Numancia	1 - 0	Huesca	Soria
20:30	Pere Milla 48'; Pablo Valcarce (yellow card) 68'	Report	Carlos David Moreno (yellow card) 22' (yellow-red card); Juanjo Camacho (yellow card) 24'; Jair Amador (yellow card) 36'; Gonzalo Melero (yellow card) 56'; Álex Remiro (yellow card) 68'; Hernández (yellow card) 86'	Stadium: Nuevo Estadio Los Pajaritos; Attendance: 2,533; Referee: (Spain) Daniel Ocón

26 August 2017 Match 2	Huesca	2 - 0	Lorca FC	Huesca
19:00	Luso (yellow card) 9'; Gonzalo Melero 18'; Brežančić (yellow card) 34'; Hernández 36'; Ávila (yellow card) 44'	Report	Dani Ojeda (yellow card) 34'; Cristian Bustos (yellow card) 43'	Stadium: Estadio El Alcoraz; Attendance: 3,139; Referee: (Spain) Victor Areces

2 September 2017 Match 3	Osasuna	1 - 1	Huesca	Pamplona
18:00	David Rodríguez (yellow card) 28'; Arzura (yellow card) 42'; Robert Morales (yellow card) 45'; Unai García 67'; Lucas Torró (yellow card) 70'; Fran Mérida (yellow card) 77' de las Cuevas (yellow card) 86'	Report	Brežančić (yellow card) 14'; Gonzalo Melero (yellow card) 29' (goal) 87'; Hernández (yellow card) 38'; Aguilera (yellow card) 67'; Jorge Pulido (yellow card) 84'; Carlos Akapo (yellow card) 90'; Álvaro Vadillo (yellow card) 90+2'	Stadium: El Sadar Stadium; Attendance: 15,114; Referee: (Spain) Gorka Sagues

9 September 2017 Match 4	Huesca	0 - 0	Sevilla Atlético	Huesca
16:00	Jorge Pulido (yellow card) 65'; Hernández (yellow card) 80'; Aguilera (yellow card) 90+6'	Report	Álex Muñoz (yellow card) 32'; Marc Gual (yellow card) 61'; José Mena Rodríguez (yellow card) 90+3'	Stadium: Estadio El Alcoraz; Attendance: 3,005; Referee: (Spain) Aitor Gorostegui

17 September 2017 Match 5	Cultural y Deportiva Leonesa	3 - 2	Huesca	León, Spain
12:00	Rodri (yellow card) 13'; Yeray 24' 45' (pen.); Josep Señé (yellow card) 56'; Ariday Cabrera (yellow card) 69'; Ahmed Yasser 79'; Isaac Carcelén (yellow card) 88'; Jorge Palatsí (yellow card) 90+3'	Report	Hernández 32' (yellow card) 90+2'; Gonzalo Melero 54'; Álex Gallar (yellow card) 89'	Stadium: Estadio Reino de León; Attendance: 7,484; Referee: (Spain) José López

24 September 2017 Match 6	Huesca	1 - 0	Real Valladolid	Huesca
12:00	Brežančić (yellow card) 27'; Gonzalo Melero 38'; Luso (yellow card) 82'; Aguilera (yellow card) 90+4'	Report	Iván Salvador (yellow card) 43'; Luismi (yellow card) 48'; Míchel (yellow card) 79' (yellow-red card)	Stadium: Estadio El Alcoraz; Attendance: 1,609; Referee: (Spain) Guillermo Cuadra Fernández

1 October 2017 Match 7	Huesca	2 - 1	Rayo Vallecano	Huesca
16:00	Aguilera 45+1'; González (yellow card) 60'; Hernández 79'	Report	Trejo 17' (pen.); Unai López (yellow card) 66'; Velázquez (yellow card) 88'; Baiano (yellow card) 90+2'; Santi Comesaña (yellow card) 90+4'	Stadium: Estadio El Alcoraz; Attendance: 3,328; Referee: (Spain) Dámaso Arcediano

7 October 2017 Match 8	Almería	0 - 3	Huesca	Almería
18:00		Report	Hernández 27' 53'; González (yellow card) 32'; Gonzalo Melero 43'; Álvaro Vadillo (yellow card) 82'	Stadium: Estadio de los Juegos Mediterráneos; Attendance: 7,226; Referee: (Spain) Saúl Ais

10 October 2017 Match 9	Huesca	1 - 1	Reus	Huesca
20:00	Álex Gallar 60'	Report	Luís Gustavo 90+1'	Stadium: Estadio El Alcoraz; Attendance: 3,217; Referee: (Spain) Adrián Cordero

13 October 2017 Match 10	Sporting de Gijón	1 - 1	Huesca	Gijón
21:00	Carlos Carmona Bonet 51'; Jordi Calavera (yellow card) 61'; Sergio Álvarez (yellow card) 69'	Report	Gonzalo Melero 62' (pen.)	Stadium: El Molinón; Attendance: 21,206; Referee: (Spain) Jorge Figueroa

21 October 2017 Match 11	Huesca	1 - 0	Cádiz CF	Huesca
16:00	Lluís Sastre 12'; Jorge Pulido (yellow card) 58'; Álex Remiro (yellow card) 74'	Report	Abdullah (yellow card) 26'; Álvaro García (yellow card) 39'; José Mari (yellow card) 90+2'	Stadium: Estadio El Alcoraz; Attendance: 3,536; Referee: (Spain) Juan Pulido

28 October 2017 Match 12	Albacete	0 - 0	Huesca	Albacete
18:00	Bíttolo (yellow card) 75'	Report	Carlos Akapo (yellow card) 26'; Álex Gallar (yellow card) 29'	Stadium: Estadio Carlos Belmonte; Attendance: 6,072; Referee: (Spain) Guillermo Cuadra Fernández

6 November 2017 Match 13	Huesca	3 - 1	Real Zaragoza	Huesca
21:00	Gonzalo Melero 16'; Aguilera (yellow card) 43'; Hernández 63' 85'; Lluís Sastre (yellow card) 77'	Report	Borja Iglesias (yellow card) 46'; Alberto Zapater (yellow card) 55' (goal) 84'; Diogo Verdasca (yellow card) 90'	Stadium: Estadio El Alcoraz; Attendance: 4,805; Referee: (Spain) Oliver De La Fuente

11 November 2017 Match 14	Barcelona B	0 - 2	Huesca	Barcelona
19:30	Sergi Palencia (yellow card) 50'; José Arnaiz (yellow card) 60'	Report	Lluís Sastre (yellow card) 23'; Brežančić (yellow card) 41'; Carlos Akapo (yellow card) 44'; Hernández 51' 61'	Stadium: Mini Estadi; Attendance: 2,482; Referee: (Spain) Jorge Valdés

18 November 2017 Match 15	Huesca	3 - 0	Tenerife	Huesca
16:00	Gonzalo Melero 35' 67'; Hernández 36'	Report	Alberto (yellow card) 26'; Juan Villar (yellow card) 38'; Raúl Cámara (yellow card) 70'; Carlos Ruiz (yellow card) 81'; Jorge (yellow card) 86'	Stadium: Estadio El Alcoraz; Attendance: 4,338; Referee: (Spain) Valentín Pizarro

26 November 2017 Match 16	Granada	2 - 0	Huesca	Granada
16:00	Joselu 33'; Machís 35'; Quini (yellow card) 90'	Report	Hernández (yellow card) 40'; Carlos Akapo (yellow card) 83'; Gonzalo Melero (yellow card) 87'; David Ferreiro (yellow card) 89' (yellow-red card)	Stadium: Nuevo Estadio de Los Cármenes; Attendance: 14,106; Referee: (Spain) Iñaki Bikandi

2 December 2017 Match 17	Huesca	3 - 1	Córdoba	Huesca
16:00	Lluís Sastre 19'; Jair Amador 41'; David Ferreiro 46'; Brežančić (yellow card) 56'	Report	Sergi Guardiola 73'; Sergio Aguza (yellow card) 90+4'	Stadium: Estadio El Alcoraz; Attendance: 3,560; Referee: (Spain) Saúl Ais

9 December 2017 Match 18	Alcorcón	1 - 1	Huesca	Alcorcón
18:00	Álvaro Peña 15' (yellow card) 88'; Jon Errasti (yellow card) 28'; Marco Sangalli (yellow card) 39'; Borja Domínguez (yellow card) 74'	Report	Rulo (yellow card) 24'; Ávila 26'; Gonzalo Melero (yellow card) 38'; Luso (yellow card) 90+1'	Stadium: Estadio de Santo Domingo; Attendance: 2,806; Referee: (Spain) David Pérez

17 December 2017 Match 19	Huesca	3 - 0	Lugo	Huesca
16:00	Gonzalo Melero 21' (pen.); Álex Remiro (yellow card) 41'; David Ferreiro 44' (yellow card) 63'; Álex Gallar 78'; Hernández (yellow card) 85'	Report	Bernardo (yellow card) 20'; Azeez (yellow card) 77'; Albarracín (yellow card) 90'	Stadium: Estadio El Alcoraz; Attendance: 4,595; Referee: (Spain) José López

23 December 2017 Match 20	Gimnàstic de Tarragona	1 - 2	Huesca	Tarragona
16:00	Assoubre (yellow card) 41'; Israfilov (yellow card) 52'; Maikel Mesa 90+4'	Report	Lluís Sastre (yellow card) 13'; Ávila 37'; Gonzalo Melero (yellow card) 68'; Brežančić (yellow card) 72'; Jair Amador 79'	Stadium: Nou Estadi de Tarragona; Attendance: 4,527; Referee: (Spain) Aitor Gorostegui

7 January 2018 Match 21	Huesca	1 - 1	Real Oviedo	Huesca
18:00	Álex Gallar 31'; Lluís Sastre (yellow card) 81'	Report	Forlín (yellow card) 13'; Christian Fernández (yellow card) 23'; Carlos Hernández (yellow card) 47'; Aarón Ñíguez 70'; Héctor Verdés (yellow card) 90+4'	Stadium: Estadio El Alcoraz; Attendance: 4,282; Referee: (Spain) Álvaro Moreno

14 January 2018 Match 22	Huesca	2 - 1	Numancia	Huesca
12:00	Jorge Pulido (yellow card) 31'; Ávila (yellow card) 39' (goal) 52'; Hernández 76' (pen.)	Report	Alberto Escassi (yellow card) 39'; Diamanka (yellow card) 40'; Carlos (yellow card) 51'; Iñigo Pérez 55'; Markel Etxeberria (yellow card) 69'; Guillermo (yellow card) 75'	Stadium: Estadio El Alcoraz; Attendance: 4,428; Referee: (Spain) Santiago Varón

20 January 2018 Match 23	Lorca FC	2 - 3	Huesca	Lorca
20:00	Mallé 1'; Apeh 30' (yellow card) 53' (yellow-red card); Javier Muñoz (yellow card) 45+1'; Carlos Peña (yellow card) 61'; Juan Pedro Pina (yellow card) 64'	Report	González 24' (yellow card) 29'; Álex Gallar (yellow card) 54'; Hernández (yellow card) 56'; Ávila 59'; Gonzalo Melero 66' (pen.); Rulo (yellow card) 90+2'	Stadium: Francisco Artés Carrasco; Attendance: 4,910; Referee: (Spain) Víctor Areces

28 January 2018 Match 24	Huesca	1 - 0	Osasuna	Huesca
18:00	Álex Gallar 28'; Lluís Sastre (yellow card) 39'; Brežančić (yellow card) 70'	Report	Borja Lasso (yellow card) 4'; Carlos Clerc (yellow card) 35' (yellow-red card); Lucas Torró (yellow card) 37'; Fran Mérida (yellow card) 75'	Stadium: Estadio El Alcoraz; Attendance: 4,896; Referee: (Spain) Rubén Eiriz

4 February 2018 Match 25	Sevilla Atlético	v	Huesca	Seville
16:00				Stadium: Estadio Viejo Nervión

=== Copa del Rey ===
6 September 2017 2nd Round	Huesca	0 - 2	Real Valladolid	Huesca
21:00	Luso (yellow card) 52'; Carlos David Moreno (yellow card) 53' (yellow-red card)	Report	Óscar Plano 16'; Ángel (yellow card) 38'; Marreh (yellow card) 46'; Asier Villalibre 50'; Toni (yellow card) 62'; Antonio Cotán (yellow card) 83'; Kiko Olivas (yellow card) 85'	Stadium: Estadio El Alcoraz; Referee: (Spain) Álvaro Moreno
