= List of Spanish football transfers summer 2018 =

This is a list of Spanish football transfers for the summer sale prior to the 2018–19 season of La Liga and Segunda División. Only moves from La Liga and Segunda División are listed.

The summer transfer window began on 1 July 2018, although a few transfers took place prior to that date. The window closed at midnight on 1 September 2018. Players without a club can join one at any time, either during or in between transfer windows. Clubs below La Liga level can also sign players on loan at any time. If needed, clubs can sign a goalkeeper on an emergency loan, if all others are unavailable.

== La Liga ==
=== Alavés ===
Manager: (Spain) Abelardo Fernández (2nd season)

==== In ====
Date	Player	From	Type	Fee	Ref
25 May 2018	(Angola) Anderson	(Croatia) Rudeš	Loan return		
29 May 2018	(Sweden) John Guidetti	(Spain) Celta Vigo	Transfer	€4M	
17 June 2018	(Spain) Jony	(Spain) Málaga	Loan		
19 June 2018	(Spain) Juanan Entrena	(Croatia) Rudeš	Loan return		
30 June 2018	(Spain) Antonio Cristian	(Croatia) Rudeš	Loan return		
30 June 2018	(Spain) Einar Galilea	(Croatia) Rudeš	Loan return		
30 June 2018	(Spain) Nando	(Spain) Lorca	Loan return		
1 July 2018	(Spain) Rafa Navarro	(Spain) Real Betis	Transfer	Free	
6 July 2018	(Spain) Ximo Navarro	(Spain) Las Palmas	Transfer	Undisclosed	
11 July 2018	(Serbia) Aleksandar Katai	(United States) Chicago Fire	Loan return		
12 July 2018	(Spain) Javier Muñoz	(Spain) Real Madrid Castilla	Transfer	Free	
16 July 2018	(Spain) Borja Bastón	(Wales) Swansea City	Loan		
27 July 2018	(Ghana) Patrick Twumasi	(Kazakhstan) Astana	Transfer	Free	
9 August 2018	(Spain) Adrián Marín	(Spain) Villarreal	Transfer	Undisclosed	
12 August 2018	(Spain) Tomás Pina	(Belgium) Club Brugge	Transfer	Undisclosed	
22 August 2018	(Argentina) Jonathan Calleri	(Uruguay) Deportivo Maldonado	Loan		
31 August 2018	(Serbia) Darko Brašanac	(Spain) Real Betis	Loan		

==== Out ====
Date	Player	To	Type	Fee	Ref
25 May 2018	(Angola) Anderson	(France) Sochaux	Loan		
29 May 2018	(Sweden) John Guidetti	(Spain) Celta Vigo	Loan return		
19 June 2018	(Spain) Juanan Entrena	(Cyprus) Omonia	Transfer	Undisclosed	
22 June 2018	(Spain) Alexis	(Saudi Arabia) Al-Ahli	Transfer	Free	
28 June 2018	(Venezuela) Christian Santos	(Spain) Deportivo La Coruña	Transfer	Free	
30 June 2018	(Spain) Héctor Hernández	(Spain) Real Sociedad	Loan return		
30 June 2018	(Spain) Bojan Krkić	(England) Stoke City	Loan return		
30 June 2018	(Spain) Álvaro Medrán	(Spain) Valecia	Loan return		
30 June 2018	(Spain) Munir	(Spain) Barcelona	Loan return		
30 June 2018	(Spain) Alfonso Pedraza	(Spain) Villarreal	Loan return		
30 June 2018	(Paraguay) Hernán Pérez	(Spain) Espanyol	Loan return		
30 June 2018	(Spain) Tomás Pina	(Belgium) Club Brugge	Loan return		
1 July 2018	(Spain) Nando	(France) Sochaux	Loan		
1 July 2018	(Spain) Rafa Navarro	(France) Sochaux	Loan		
11 July 2018	(Serbia) Aleksandar Katai	(United States) Chicago Fire	Transfer	Undisclosed	
12 July 2018	(Spain) Javier Muñoz	(Spain) Oviedo	Loan		
18 July 2018	(Spain) Antonio Cristian	(Spain) Fuenlabrada	Loan		
24 July 2018	(Bosnia and Herzegovina) Ermedin Demirović	(France) Sochaux	Loan		
28 July 2018	(Spain) Sergio Llamas	TBD		Free	

=== Athletic Bilbao ===
Manager: (Argentina) Eduardo Berizzo (1st season)

==== In ====
Date	Player	From	Type	Fee	Ref
30 June 2018	(Spain) Markel Etxeberria	(Spain) Numancia	Loan return		
30 June 2018	(Spain) Unai López	(Spain) Rayo Vallecano	Loan return		
30 June 2018	(Spain) Álex Remiro	(Spain) Huesca	Loan return		
30 June 2018	(Spain) Asier Villalibre	(Spain) Lorca	Loan return		
1 July 2018	(Spain) Ander Capa	(Spain) Eibar	Transfer	€3M	
1 July 2018	(Romania) Cristian Ganea	(Romania) Viitorul Constanța	Transfer	€1M	
1 July 2018	(Spain) Dani García	(Spain) Eibar	Transfer	Free	
2 July 2018	(Spain) Yuri Berchiche	(France) Paris Saint-Germain	Transfer	€19M	

==== Out ====
Date	Player	To	Type	Fee	Ref
28 June 2018	(Spain) Enric Saborit	(Israel) Maccabi Tel Aviv	Transfer	Free	
30 June 2018	(Spain) Kike Sola	Retired			
4 July 2018	(Spain) Mikel Vesga	(Spain) Leganés	Loan		
23 July 2018	(Spain) Xabier Etxeita	(Spain) Huesca	Loan		
8 August 2018	(Spain) Kepa Arrizabalaga	(England) Chelsea	Transfer	£72M	
31 August 2018	(Spain) Sabin Merino	(Spain) Leganés	Loan		

=== Atlético Madrid ===
Manager: (Argentina) Diego Simeone (8th season)

==== In ====
Date	Player	From	Type	Fee	Ref
24 May 2018	(Spain) Rodri	(Spain) Villarreal	Transfer	€20M	
30 June 2018	(Spain) Héctor Hernández	(Spain) Albacete	Loan return		
30 June 2018	(Portugal) Diogo Jota	(England) Wolverhampton Wanderers	Loan return		
30 June 2018	(Ghana) Bernard Mensah	(Turkey) Kasımpaşa	Loan return		
30 June 2018	(Portugal) André Moreira	(Portugal) Belenenses	Loan return		
30 June 2018	(Uruguay) Emiliano Velázquez	(Spain) Rayo Vallecano	Loan return		
30 June 2018	(Argentina) Luciano Vietto	(Spain) Valencia	Loan return		
10 July 2018	(Spain) Antonio Adán	(Spain) Real Betis	Transfer	€1M	
25 July 2018	(Spain) Jonny Castro	(Spain) Celta Vigo	Transfer	€7M	
25 July 2018	(Portugal) Gelson Martins	(Portugal) Sporting CP	Transfer	Free	
27 July 2018	(France) Thomas Lemar	(France) Monaco	Transfer	£52m	
31 July 2018	(Colombia) Santiago Arias	(Netherlands) PSV	Transfer	€11M	
9 August 2018	(Croatia) Nikola Kalinić	(Italy) Fiorentina	Transfer	€8.9M	

==== Out ====
Date	Player	To	Type	Fee	Ref
28 June 2018	(Spain) Gabi	(Qatar) Al Sadd	Transfer	Free	
1 July 2018	(Portugal) Diogo Jota	(England) Wolverhampton Wanderers	Transfer	£12.6M	
3 July 2018	(Ghana) Bernard Mensah	(Turkey) Kayserispor	Loan		
10 July 2018	(Spain) Fernando Torres	(Japan) Sagan Tosu	Transfer	Free	
11 July 2018	(Argentina) Axel Werner	(Spain) Huesca	Loan		
23 July 2018	(Uruguay) Emiliano Velázquez	(Spain) Rayo Vallecano	Transfer	€1M	
25 July 2018	(Spain) Jonny Castro	(England) Wolverhampton Wanderers	Loan		
31 July 2018	(Croatia) Šime Vrsaljko	(Italy) Internazionale	Loan		
1 August 2018	(Portugal) André Moreira	(England) Aston Villa	Loan		
9 August 2018	(Argentina) Luciano Vietto	(England) Fulham	Loan		
13 August 2018	(France) Kevin Gameiro	(Spain) Valencia	Transfer	€16M	

=== Barcelona ===
Manager: (Spain) Ernesto Valverde (2nd season)

==== In ====
Date	Player	From	Type	Fee	Ref
11 June 2018	(Spain) Gerard Deulofeu	(England) Watford	Loan return		
30 June 2018	(Brazil) Douglas	(Portugal) Benfica	Loan return		
30 June 2018	(Spain) Munir	(Spain) Alavés	Loan return		
30 June 2018	(Brazil) Rafinha	(Italy) Internazionale	Loan return		
30 June 2018	(Brazil) Marlon Santos	(France) Nice	Loan return		
9 July 2018	(Brazil) Arthur	(Brazil) Grêmio	Transfer	€31M	
12 July 2018	(France) Clément Lenglet	(Spain) Sevilla	Transfer	€35M	
24 July 2018	(Brazil) Malcom	(France) Bordeaux	Transfer	€41M	
3 August 2018	(Chile) Arturo Vidal	(Germany) Bayern Munich	Transfer	€18.1M	

==== Out ====
Date	Player	To	Type	Fee	Ref
24 May 2018	(Spain) Andrés Iniesta	(Japan) Vissel Kobe	Transfer	Free	
11 June 2018	(Spain) Gerard Deulofeu	(England) Watford	Transfer	£11.5M	
8 July 2018	(Brazil) Paulinho	(China) Guangzhou Evergrande	Loan		
23 July 2018	(Brazil) Douglas	(Turkey) Sivasspor	Loan		
1 August 2018	(France) Lucas Digne	(England) Everton	Transfer	£18M	
4 August 2018	(Spain) Aleix Vidal	(Spain) Sevilla	Transfer	€8.5M	
9 August 2018	(Portugal) André Gomes	(England) Everton	Loan	£2M	
9 August 2018	(Colombia) Yerry Mina	(England) Everton	Transfer	£27M	
16 August 2018	(Brazil) Marlon Santos	(Italy) Sassuolo	Transfer	€6M	
28 August 2018	(Spain) Paco Alcácer	(Germany) Borussia Dortmund	Loan	€2M	

=== Celta Vigo ===
Manager: (Argentina) Antonio Mohamed (1st season)

==== In ====
Date	Player	From	Type	Fee	Ref
29 May 2018	(Sweden) John Guidetti	(Spain) Alavés	Loan return		
4 June 2018	(Spain) David Juncà	(Spain) Eibar	Transfer	Free	
14 June 2018	(Mexico) Néstor Araujo	(Mexico) Santos Laguna	Transfer	Undisclosed	
16 June 2018	(Turkey) Okay Yokuşlu	(Turkey) Trabzonspor	Transfer	€7.5M	
19 June 2018	(Spain) Álvaro Lemos	(Spain) Lugo	Loan return		
30 June 2018	(Guadeloupe) Claudio Beauvue	(Spain) Leganés	Loan return		
30 June 2018	(Belgium) Théo Bongonda	(Belgium) Zulte-Waregem	Loan return		
30 June 2018	(Spain) David Costas	(Spain) Barcelona B	Loan return		
30 June 2018	(Spain) Borja Fernández	(Spain) Reus	Loan return		
30 June 2018	(Denmark) Andrew Hjulsager	(Spain) Granada	Loan return		
30 June 2018	(Spain) Iván Villar	(Spain) Levante	Loan return		
20 July 2018	(Morocco) Sofiane Boufal	(England) Southampton	Loan		
1 August 2018	(Spain) Fran Beltrán	(Spain) Rayo Vallecano	Transfer	€8M	
8 August 2018	(Denmark) Mathias Jensen	(Denmark) FC Nordsjælland	Transfer	€5M	
14 August 2018	(Paraguay) Júnior Alonso	(France) Lille	Loan		

==== Out ====
Date	Player	To	Type	Fee	Ref
29 May 2018	(Sweden) John Guidetti	(Spain) Alavés	Transfer	€4M	
19 June 2018	(Spain) Álvaro Lemos	(Spain) Las Palmas	Transfer	Undisclosed	
30 June 2018	(Argentina) Lucas Boyé	(Italy) Torino	Loan return		
4 July 2018	(Belgium) Théo Bongonda	(Belgium) Zulte-Waregem	Transfer	€1.6M	
4 July 2018	(Chile) Pablo Hernández	(Argentina) Independiente	Transfer	€1M	
9 July 2018	(Spain) Borja Iglesias	(Spain) Espanyol	Transfer	€10M	
10 July 2018	(Denmark) Daniel Wass	(Spain) Valencia	Transfer	€6M	
23 July 2018	(Spain) Sergi Gómez	(Spain) Sevilla	Transfer	€5M	
25 July 2018	(Spain) Jonny Castro	(Spain) Atlético Madrid	Transfer	€7M	
8 August 2018	(Spain) Juan Hernández	(Spain) Cádiz	Loan		
8 August 2018	(Spain) Andreu Fontàs	(United States) Sporting Kansas City	Transfer	Free	
30 August 2018	(Guadeloupe) Claudio Beauvue	(France) Caen	Loan		

=== Eibar ===
Manager: (Spain) José Luis Mendilibar (4th season)

==== In ====
Date	Player	From	Type	Fee	Ref
27 April 2018	(Chile) Fabián Orellana	(Spain) Valencia	Transfer	€2M	
30 June 2018	(Portugal) Bebé	(Spain) Rayo Vallecano	Loan return		
30 June 2018	(Spain) Unai Elgezabal	(Spain) Numancia	Loan return		
30 June 2018	(Spain) Álex Gálvez	(Spain) Las Palmas	Loan return		
30 June 2018	(Spain) Pablo Hervías	(Spain) Valladolid	Loan return		
30 June 2018	(Spain) Pere Milla	(Spain) Numancia	Loan return		
30 June 2018	(Spain) Nano Mesa	(Spain) Sporting Gijón	Loan return		
30 June 2018	(Spain) Cristian Rivera	(Spain) Barcelona B	Loan return		
1 July 2018	(Spain) José Antonio Martínez	(Spain) Barcelona B	Transfer	Free	
19 July 2018	(Spain) Marc Cardona	(Spain) Barcelona B	Loan		
26 July 2018	(Spain) Sergio Álvarez	(Spain) Sporting Gijón	Transfer	€4M	
31 July 2018	(Spain) Pedro Bigas	(Spain) Las Palmas	Loan		
30 August 2018	(Argentina) Pablo de Blasis	(Germany) Mainz 05	Transfer	€2M	
31 August 2018	(Spain) Marc Cucurella	(Spain) Barcelona B	Loan		

==== Out ====
Date	Player	To	Type	Fee	Ref
27 April 2018	(Chile) Fabián Orellana	(Spain) Valencia	Loan return		
25 May 2018	(Spain) Ander Capa	(Spain) Athletic Bilbao	Transfer	€3M	
4 June 2018	(Spain) David Juncà	(Spain) Celta Vigo	Transfer	Free	
30 June 2018	(Serbia) Vukašin Jovanović	(France) Bordeaux	Loan return		
30 June 2018	(Spain) David Lombán	TBD		Free	
30 June 2018	(Spain) Fran Rico	(Spain) Granada	Loan return		
1 July 2018	(Spain) Dani García	(Spain) Athletic Bilbao	Transfer	Free	
1 July 2018	(Japan) Takashi Inui	(Spain) Real Betis	Transfer	Free	
26 July 2018	(Spain) Iván Alejo	(Spain) Getafe	Transfer	€4M	
30 July 2018	(Spain) José Antonio Martínez	(Spain) Granada	Loan		
31 July 2018	(Spain) Christian Rivera	(Spain) Las Palmas	Transfer	Undisclosed	
4 August 2018	(Spain) Nano	(Spain) Tenerife	Loan		
15 August 2018	(Spain) Unai Elgezabal	(Spain) Alcorcón	Loan		
30 August 2018	(Spain) Yoel	(Spain) Valladolid	Loan		
31 August 2018	(Portugal) Bebé	(Spain) Rayo Vallecano	Transfer	€750K	
31 August 2018	(Spain) Álex Gálvez	(Spain) Rayo Vallecano	Transfer	Free	

=== Espanyol ===
Manager: (Spain) Rubi (1st season)

==== In ====
Date	Player	From	Type	Fee	Ref
30 June 2018	(Paraguay) Hernán Pérez	(Spain) Alavés	Loan return		
30 June 2018	(Spain) Roberto Jiménez	(Spain) Málaga	Loan return		
30 June 2018	(Spain) Álvaro Vázquez	(Spain) Gimnàstic	Loan return		
1 July 2018	(Spain) Sergi Darder	(France) Lyon	Transfer	€8M	
1 July 2018	(Spain) Sergio Sánchez	(Russia) Rubin Kazan	Transfer	Free	
9 July 2018	(Spain) Borja Iglesias	(Spain) Celta Vigo	Transfer	€10M	
31 August 2018	(Venezuela) Roberto Rosales	(Spain) Málaga	Loan		

==== Out ====
Date	Player	To	Type	Fee	Ref
12 June 2018	(Spain) Gerard Moreno	(Spain) Villarreal	Transfer	€20M	
15 June 2018	(Spain) Marc Navarro	(England) Watford	Transfer	£1.8M	
21 June 2018	(Spain) José Manuel Jurado	(Saudi Arabia) Al-Ahli	Transfer	Free	
30 June 2018	(Spain) Jairo Morillas	(Japan) V-Varen Nagasaki	Transfer	Free	
30 June 2018	(Colombia) Carlos Sánchez	(Italy) Fiorentina	Loan return		
30 June 2018	(Spain) Sergio Sánchez	(Russia) Rubin Kazan	Loan return		
1 July 2018	(Spain) Pau López	(Spain) Real Betis	Transfer	Free	
6 August 2018	(Spain) Aarón Martín	(Germany) Mainz 05	Loan		
23 August 2018	(Spain) Álvaro Vázquez	(Spain) Zaragoza	Loan		
31 August 2018	(Spain) Sergio Sánchez	Unattached			

=== Getafe ===
Manager: (Spain) José Bordalás (3rd season)

==== In ====
Date	Player	From	Type	Fee	Ref
20 May 2018	(Mexico) Oswaldo Alanís	(Mexico) Guadalajara	Transfer	Free	
29 May 2018	(Spain) Alberto García	(Spain) Rayo Vallecano	Loan return		
8 June 2018	(Argentina) Emi Buendía	(Spain) Cultural Leonesa	Loan return		
11 June 2018	(Portugal) Vitorino Antunes	(Ukraine) Dynamo Kyiv	Transfer	€2.5M	
11 June 2018	(Uruguay) Mauro Arambarri	(Uruguay) Boston River	Transfer	€2M	
22 June 2018	(Spain) Sergi Guardiola	(Spain) Córdoba	Loan		
27 June 2018	(Spain) Markel Bergara	(Spain) Real Sociedad	Transfer	Free	
30 June 2018	(Spain) Chuli	(Spain) Lugo	Loan return		
30 June 2018	(Spain) Robert Ibáñez	(Spain) Osasuna	Loan return		
30 June 2018	(Spain) Rubén Yáñez	(Spain) Cádiz	Loan return		
30 June 2018	(France) Karim Yoda	(Spain) Reus	Loan return		
2 July 2018	(Spain) Jaime Mata	(Spain) Valladolid	Transfer	Free	
4 July 2018	(Argentina) Leandro Chichizola	(Spain) Las Palmas	Transfer	Free	
6 July 2018	(Morocco) Ayoub Abou	(Spain) Rayo Majadahonda	Transfer	Free	
7 July 2018	(Uruguay) Leandro Cabrera	(Italy) Crotone	Transfer	€605K	
13 July 2018	(Spain) José Carlos Lazo	(Spain) Real Madrid Castilla	Transfer	Free	
13 July 2018	(Spain) David Soria	(Spain) Sevilla	Transfer	€3M	
16 July 2018	(Serbia) Nemanja Maksimović	(Spain) Valencia	Transfer	€5M	
26 July 2018	(Spain) Iván Alejo	(Spain) Eibar	Transfer	€4M	
4 August 2018	(Spain) Ignasi Miquel	(Spain) Málaga	Transfer	€3.5M	
23 August 2018	(France) Dimitri Foulquier	(England) Watford	Loan		
31 August 2018	(Uruguay) Sebastián Cristóforo	(Italy) Fiorentina	Loan		

==== Out ====
Date	Player	To	Type	Fee	Ref
29 May 2018	(Spain) Alberto García	(Spain) Rayo Vallecano	Transfer	Free	
8 June 2018	(Argentina) Emi Buendía	(England) Norwich City	Transfer	£1.3M	
11 June 2018	(Portugal) Vitorino Antunes	(Ukraine) Dynamo Kyiv	Loan return		
11 June 2018	(Uruguay) Mauro Arambarri	(Uruguay) Boston River	Loan return		
25 June 2018	(Spain) Francisco Molinero	(Spain) Sporting Gijón	Transfer	Free	
27 June 2018	(Spain) Markel Bergara	(Spain) Real Sociedad	Loan return		
30 June 2018	(Uruguay) Leandro Cabrera	(Italy) Crotone	Loan return		
30 June 2018	(France) Mathieu Flamini	TBD		Free	
30 June 2018	(Argentina) Emiliano Martínez	(England) Arsenal	Loan return		
30 June 2018	(Spain) Sergio Mora	TBD		Free	
30 June 2018	(France) Loïc Rémy	(Spain) Las Palmas	Loan return		
1 July 2018	(Spain) Vicente Guaita	(England) Crystal Palace	Transfer	Free	
4 July 2018	(Uruguay) Mathías Olivera	(Spain) Albacete	Loan		
26 July 2018	(Serbia) Filip Manojlović	(Greece) Panionios	Loan		
31 July 2018	(France) Karim Yoda	(Spain) Reus	Transfer	Free	
2 August 2018	(Morocco) Ayoub Abou	(Spain) Real Madrid Castilla	Transfer	Free	
3 August 2018	(Morocco) Fayçal Fajr	(France) Caen	Transfer	€1.5M	
6 August 2018	(Spain) José Carlos Lazo	(Spain) Lugo	Loan		
14 August 2018	(Spain) Chuli	(Spain) Extremadura	Loan		
15 August 2018	(Spain) Dani Pacheco	(Spain) Málaga	Transfer	Free	
22 August 2018	(Spain) Álvaro Jiménez	(Spain) Sporting Gijón	Loan		
23 August 2018	(Democratic Republic of the Congo) Merveille Ndockyt	(Spain) Mallorca	Loan		
28 August 2018	(Mexico) Oswaldo Alanís	(Spain) Oviedo	Transfer	Free	

=== Girona ===
Manager: (Spain) Eusebio Sacristán (1st season)

==== In ====
Date	Player	From	Type	Fee	Ref
27 June 2018	(Spain) Marc Muniesa	(England) Stoke City	Transfer	£4.5M	
29 June 2018	(Colombia) Johan Mojica	(Spain) Rayo Vallecano	Transfer	€5M	
30 June 2018	(Spain) Rubén Alcaraz	(Spain) Almería	Loan return		
30 June 2018	(France) Farid Boulaya	(France) Metz	Loan return		
30 June 2018	(Spain) Sebas Coris	(Spain) Osasuna	Loan return		
16 August 2018	(England) Patrick Roberts	(England) Manchester City	Loan		
18 August 2018	(Spain) Jairo Izquierdo	(Spain) Extremadura	Transfer	€200K	
27 August 2018	(Ivory Coast) Seydou Doumbia	(Italy) Roma	Transfer	Free	
31 August 2018	(Brazil) Douglas Luiz	(England) Manchester City	Loan		

==== Out ====
Date	Player	To	Type	Fee	Ref
14 May 2018	(Spain) Pablo Maffeo	(England) Manchester City	Loan return		
27 June 2018	(Spain) Marc Muniesa	(England) Stoke City	Loan return		
29 June 2018	(Colombia) Johan Mojica	(Spain) Rayo Vallecano	Loan return		
30 June 2018	(Spain) Aleix García	(England) Manchester City	Loan return		
30 June 2018	(Brazil) Douglas Luiz	(England) Manchester City	Loan return		
30 June 2018	(Kenya) Michael Olunga	(China) Guizhou Zhicheng	Loan return		
25 July 2018	(Spain) Eloi Amagat	(United States) New York City	Transfer	Free	
3 August 2018	(Spain) Rubén Alcaraz	(Spain) Valladolid	Transfer	€1M	
10 August 2018	(Spain) Sebas Coris	(Spain) Gimnàstic	Loan		
29 August 2018	(Spain) Jairo Izquierdo	(Spain) Cádiz	Loan		
31 August 2018	(Spain) David Timor	(Spain) Las Palmas	Transfer	€1.5M	

=== Huesca ===
Manager: (Argentina) Leo Franco (1st season)

==== In ====
Date	Player	From	Type	Fee	Ref
6 June 2018	(Spain) Jorge Miramón	(Spain) Reus	Transfer	Free	
15 June 2018	(Portugal) Luisinho	(Spain) Deportivo La Coruña	Transfer	Free	
5 July 2018	(Italy) Samuele Longo	(Italy) Internazionale	Loan		
5 July 2018	(Spain) Eugeni Valderrama	(Spain) Valencia Mestalla	Transfer	Free	
9 July 2018	(Honduras) Jonathan Toro	(Portugal) Gil Vicente	Transfer	Undisclosed	
11 July 2018	(Argentina) Axel Werner	(Spain) Atlético Madrid	Loan		
14 July 2018	(Argentina) Damián Musto	(Mexico) Tijuana	Loan		
15 July 2018	(Spain) Dani Escriche	(Spain) Lugo	Transfer	€500K	
19 July 2018	(Portugal) Rúben Semedo	(Spain) Villarreal	Loan		
20 July 2018	(Spain) Pablo Insua	(Germany) Schalke 04	Loan		
23 July 2018	(Spain) Xabier Etxeita	(Spain) Athletic Bilbao	Loan		
7 August 2018	(Turkey) Serdar Gürler	(Turkey) Osmanlıspor	Transfer	€2.5M	
28 August 2018	(Serbia) Aleksandar Jovanović	(Denmark) AGF	Transfer	Undisclosed	

==== Out ====
Date	Player	To	Type	Fee	Ref
7 June 2018	(Spain) Jair Amador	(Israel) Maccabi Tel Aviv	Transfer	Free	
27 June 2018	(Spain) Álvaro Vadillo	(Spain) Granada	Transfer	Free	
30 June 2018	(Spain) Álex Remiro	(Spain) Athletic Bilbao	Loan return		
30 June 2018	(Argentina) Ezequiel Rescaldani	(Colombia) Atlético Nacional	Loan return		
30 June 2018	(Spain) Nagore	TBD		Free	
5 July 2018	(Spain) Carlos David	(Belgium) Union SG	Transfer	Free	
15 July 2018	(Spain) Dani Escriche	(Spain) Lugo	Loan		
23 July 2018	(Spain) Luso	(Spain) Rayo Majadahonda	Transfer	Free	
1 August 2018	(Spain) Eugeni Valderrama	(Spain) Albacete	Loan		
5 August 2018	(Venezuela) Alexander González	(Spain) Elche	Transfer	Free	
9 August 2018	(Spain) Kilian Grant	(Spain) UCAM Murcia	Transfer	Free	
10 August 2018	(Honduras) Jonathan Toro	(Portugal) Varzim	Loan		
14 August 2018	(Spain) Ander Bardají	(Spain) Fuenlabrada	Loan		
16 August 2018	(Spain) Rulo Prieto	(Spain) Alcorcón	Transfer	Free	

=== Leganés ===
Manager: (Argentina) Mauricio Pellegrino (1st season)

==== In ====
Date	Player	From	Type	Fee	Ref
27 June 2018	(Spain) Rodrigo Tarín	(Spain) Barcelona B	Transfer	Free	
28 June 2018	(Spain) Dani Ojeda	(Spain) Lorca	Transfer	Free	
30 June 2018	(Ivory Coast) Mamadou Koné	(Belgium) Eupen	Loan return		
30 June 2018	(Ghana) Owusu Kwabena	(Spain) Cartagena	Loan return		
2 July 2018	(Venezuela) Josua Mejías	(Venezuela) Carabobo	Transfer	€455K	
4 July 2018	(Spain) Mikel Vesga	(Spain) Athletic Bilbao	Loan		
5 July 2018	(Spain) Fede Vico	(Spain) Lugo	Transfer	Free	
6 July 2018	(Spain) Rubén Pérez	(Spain) Granada	Transfer	Free	
8 July 2018	(Argentina) Guido Carrillo	(England) Southampton	Loan		
9 July 2018	(Argentina) Facundo García	(Argentina) Olimpo	Transfer	Undisclosed	
12 July 2018	(Spain) Juanfran	(Spain) Deportivo La Coruña	Loan		
24 July 2018	(Argentina) Jonathan Silva	(Portugal) Sporting CP	Loan		
26 July 2018	(Uruguay) Diego Rolán	(Spain) Deportivo La Coruña	Loan		
1 August 2018	(Uruguay) Michael Santos	(Spain) Málaga	Loan		
13 August 2018	(Spain) José Arnaiz	(Spain) Barcelona B	Transfer	€5M	
13 August 2018	(Spain) Óscar Rodríguez	(Spain) Real Madrid Castilla	Loan		
15 August 2018	(Nigeria) Kenneth Omeruo	(England) Chelsea	Loan	€800K	
17 August 2018	(Morocco) Youssef En-Nesyri	(Spain) Málaga	Transfer	€6M	
17 August 2018	(Cameroon) Allan Nyom	(England) West Bromwich Albion	Loan		
27 August 2018	(Ukraine) Andriy Lunin	(Spain) Real Madrid	Loan		
31 August 2018	(Spain) Sabin Merino	(Spain) Athletic Bilbao	Loan		
31 August 2018	(Spain) Recio	(Spain) Málaga	Transfer	€1.5M	

==== Out ====
Date	Player	To	Type	Fee	Ref
13 June 2018	(Spain) Miguel Ángel Guerrero	(Greece) Olympiacos	Transfer	Free	
15 June 2018	(Argentina) Martín Mantovani	(Spain) Las Palmas	Transfer	Free	
30 June 2018	(Saudi Arabia) Yahya Al-Shehri	(Saudi Arabia) Al-Nassr	Loan return		
30 June 2018	(Morocco) Nordin Amrabat	(England) Watford	Loan return		
30 June 2018	(Guadeloupe) Claudio Beauvue	(Spain) Celta Vigo	Loan return		
30 June 2018	(Serbia) Darko Brašanac	(Spain) Real Betis	Loan return		
30 June 2018	(Spain) José Naranjo	(Belgium) Genk	Loan return		
30 June 2018	(Spain) Rubén Pérez	(Spain) Granada	Loan return		
30 June 2018	(Spain) Joseba Zaldúa	(Spain) Real Sociedad	Loan return		
3 July 2018	(Argentina) Nereo Champagne	(Argentina) Olimpo	Loan return		
9 July 2018	(Spain) Fede Vico	(Spain) Granada	Loan		
24 July 2018	(Ghana) Owusu Kwabena	(Spain) Salmantino	Loan		
24 July 2018	(Spain) Diego Rico	(England) Bournemouth	Transfer	£10.8M	
29 July 2018	(Spain) Tito	(Spain) Rayo Vallecano	Transfer	Free	
30 July 2018	(Venezuela) Josua Mejías	(Spain) Gimnàstic	Loan		
17 August 2018	(Ivory Coast) Mamadou Koné	(Spain) Málaga	Loan		
21 August 2018	(Argentina) Facundo García	(Cyprus) AEK Larnaca	Loan		
27 August 2018	(Brazil) Gabriel	(Portugal) Benfica	Transfer	€10M	

=== Levante ===
Manager: (Spain) Paco López (2nd season)

==== In ====
Date	Player	From	Type	Fee	Ref
16 May 2018	(Uruguay) Erick Cabaco	(Uruguay) Nacional	Transfer	€2M	
28 June 2018	(Spain) Coke	(Germany) Schalke 04	Transfer	Undisclosed	
30 June 2018	(Spain) Javier Espinosa	(Spain) Granada	Loan return		
30 June 2018	(Spain) Rubén García	(Spain) Sporting Gijón	Loan return		
30 June 2018	(Spain) Samu García	(Spain) Málaga	Loan return		
30 June 2018	(Montenegro) Esteban Saveljich	(Spain) Albacete	Loan return		
30 June 2018	(Spain) Verza	(Spain) Almería	Loan return		
4 July 2018	(Spain) Rubén Rochina	(Russia) Rubin Kazan	Transfer	Undisclosed	
7 July 2018	(Spain) Rober Pier	(Spain) Deportivo La Coruña	Loan		
23 July 2018	(Spain) Aitor Fernández	(Spain) Numancia	Transfer	€1M	
1 August 2018	(Bosnia and Herzegovina) Sanjin Prcić	(France) Rennes	Transfer	Free	
6 August 2018	(Nigeria) Moses Simon	(Belgium) Gent	Transfer	Undisclosed	
7 August 2018	(Ghana) Raphael Dwamena	(Switzerland) FC Zürich	Transfer	€6M	
9 August 2018	(Montenegro) Nikola Vukčević	(Portugal) Braga	Transfer	€8.9M	
31 August 2018	(Spain) Borja Mayoral	(Spain) Real Madrid	Loan		

==== Out ====
Date	Player	To	Type	Fee	Ref
16 May 2018	(Uruguay) Erick Cabaco	(Uruguay) Nacional	Loan return		
28 June 2018	(Spain) Coke	(Germany) Schalke 04	Loan return		
30 June 2018	(Saudi Arabia) Fahad Al-Muwallad	(Saudi Arabia) Al-Ittihad	Loan return		
30 June 2018	(Spain) Álex Alegría	(Spain) Real Betis	Loan return		
30 June 2018	(Serbia) Saša Lukić	(Italy) Torino	Loan return		
30 June 2018	(Italy) Giampaolo Pazzini	(Italy) Verona	Loan return		
30 June 2018	(Spain) Rubén Rochina	(Russia) Rubin Kazan	Loan return		
30 June 2018	(Spain) Iván Villar	(Spain) Celta Vigo	Loan return		
30 June 2018	(Spain) Rober Pier	(Spain) Deportivo La Coruña	Loan return		
23 July 2018	(Spain) Raúl Fernández	(Spain) Las Palmas	Transfer	Free	
27 July 2018	(Spain) Ivi López	(Spain) Valladolid	Loan		
7 August 2018	(Colombia) Jefferson Lerma	(England) Bournemouth	Transfer	£25.2M	
20 August 2018	(Spain) Rubén García	(Spain) Osasuna	Transfer	Free	
28 August 2018	(Spain) Iván López	(Spain) Gimnàstic	Loan		
31 August 2018	(Spain) Javier Espinosa	(Netherlands) Twente	Transfer	Free	
31 August 2018	(Montenegro) Esteban Saveljich	(Spain) Almería	Loan		
31 August 2018	(Spain) Verza	(Spain) Rayo Majadahonda	Transfer	Free	

=== Rayo Vallecano ===
Manager: (Spain) Míchel (3rd season)

==== In ====
Date	Player	From	Type	Fee	Ref
29 May 2018	(Spain) Alberto García	(Spain) Getafe	Transfer	Free	
29 June 2018	(Colombia) Johan Mojica	(Spain) Girona	Loan return		
30 June 2018	(Guinea) Lass Bangoura	(Spain) Almería	Loan return		
30 June 2018	(Spain) Nacho Monsalve	(Spain) Recreativo	Loan return		
30 June 2018	(Spain) Javi Noblejas	(Spain) Córdoba	Loan return		
13 July 2018	(Democratic Republic of the Congo) Gaël Kakuta	Hebei China Fortune	Transfer	€3M	
23 July 2018	(Uruguay) Emiliano Velázquez	(Spain) Atlético Madrid	Transfer	€1M	
27 July 2018	(Spain) José Ángel Pozo	(Spain) Almería	Transfer	€1.5M	
29 July 2018	(Peru) Luis Advíncula	(Mexico) Tigres UANL	Loan		
29 July 2018	(Spain) Tito	(Spain) Leganés	Transfer	Free	
9 August 2018	(Spain) Jordi Amat	(Wales) Swansea City	Transfer	£900K	
11 August 2018	(Spain) Álvaro Medrán	(Spain) Valencia	Loan		
23 August 2018	(Spain) Álvaro García	(Spain) Cádiz	Transfer	€5M	
24 August 2018	(Spain) Raúl de Tomás	(Spain) Real Madrid	Loan		
25 August 2018	(Spain) José León	(Spain) Real Madrid Castilla	Transfer	Undisclosed	
24 August 2018	(France) Giannelli Imbula	(England) Stoke City	Loan		
31 August 2018	(Spain) Álex Alegría	(Spain) Real Betis	Loan		
31 August 2018	(Portugal) Bebé	(Spain) Eibar	Transfer	€750K	
31 August 2018	(North Macedonia) Stole Dimitrievski	(Spain) Gimnàstic	Loan		
31 August 2018	(Spain) Álex Gálvez	(Spain) Eibar	Transfer	Free	

==== Out ====
Date	Player	To	Type	Fee	Ref
29 May 2018	(Spain) Alberto García	(Spain) Getafe	Loan return		
12 June 2018	(Spain) Diego Aguirre	(Spain) Zaragoza	Transfer	Free	
28 June 2018	(Brazil) Baiano	(Turkey) Alanyaspor	Transfer	Free	
29 June 2018	(Colombia) Johan Mojica	(Spain) Girona	Transfer	€5M	
30 June 2018	(Saudi Arabia) Abdulmajeed Al-Sulayhem	(Saudi Arabia) Al-Shabab	Loan return		
30 June 2018	(Portugal) Bebé	(Spain) Eibar	Loan return		
30 June 2018	(Argentina) Francisco Cerro	TBD		Free	
30 June 2018	(Argentina) Alejandro Domínguez	TBD		Free	
30 June 2018	(Angola) Manucho	TBD		Free	
30 June 2018	(Argentina) Emiliano Armenteros	TBD		Free	
30 June 2018	(Spain) Raúl de Tomás	(Spain) Real Madrid	Loan return		
30 June 2018	(Spain) Unai López	(Spain) Athletic Bilbao	Loan return		
30 June 2018	(Uruguay) Emiliano Velázquez	(Spain) Atlético Madrid	Loan return		
13 July 2018	(Spain) Ernesto Galán	(Spain) Rayo Majadahonda	Transfer	Free	
31 July 2018	(Spain) Antonio Amaya	(Spain) UCAM Murcia	Transfer	Free	
1 August 2018	(Spain) Fran Beltrán	(Spain) Celta Vigo	Transfer	€8M	
3 August 2018	(Spain) Mario Fernández	(Spain) Cartagena	Transfer	Free	
3 August 2018	(Spain) Nacho Monsalve	(Netherlands) Twente	Transfer	Free	
20 August 2018	(Spain) Javi Noblejas	(Spain) Sporting Gijón	Transfer	Free	

=== Real Betis ===
Manager: (Spain) Quique Setién (2nd season)

==== In ====
Date	Player	From	Type	Fee	Ref
30 May 2018	(Argentina) Germán Pezzella	(Italy) Fiorentina	Loan return		
30 June 2018	(Spain) Álex Alegría	(Spain) Levante	Loan return		
30 June 2018	(Serbia) Darko Brašanac	(Spain) Leganés	Loan return		
30 June 2018	(Colombia) Juanjo Narváez	(Spain) Córdoba	Loan return		
30 June 2018	(Romania) Alin Toșca	(Italy) Benevento	Loan return		
1 July 2018	(Spain) Antonio Barragán	(England) Middlesbrough	Transfer	€1M	
1 July 2018	(Japan) Takashi Inui	(Spain) Eibar	Transfer	Free	
1 July 2018	(Spain) Pau López	(Spain) Espanyol	Transfer	Free	
3 July 2018	(Spain) Sergio Canales	(Spain) Real Sociedad	Transfer	Free	
5 July 2018	(Spain) Joel Robles	(England) Everton	Transfer	Free	
13 July 2018	(Portugal) William Carvalho	(Portugal) Sporting CP	Transfer	€20M	
2 August 2018	(Brazil) Sidnei	(Spain) Deportivo La Coruña	Transfer	€4.5M	
31 August 2018	(Argentina) Giovani Lo Celso	(France) Paris Saint-Germain	Loan		

==== Out ====
Date	Player	To	Type	Fee	Ref
26 May 2018	(Spain) Dani Giménez	(Spain) Deportivo La Coruña	Transfer	Free	
30 May 2018	(Argentina) Germán Pezzella	(Italy) Fiorentina	Transfer	€11M	
22 June 2018	(Denmark) Riza Durmisi	(Italy) Lazio	Transfer	€6.5M	
30 June 2018	(Spain) Jordi Amat	(Wales) Swansea City	Loan return		
30 June 2018	(Spain) Antonio Barragán	(England) Middlesbrough	Loan return		
30 June 2018	(Costa Rica) Joel Campbell	(England) Arsenal	Loan return		
1 July 2018	(Spain) Rafa Navarro	(Spain) Alavés	Transfer	Free	
5 July 2018	(Spain) Fabián Ruiz	(Italy) Napoli	Transfer	€30M	
10 July 2018	(Spain) Antonio Adán	(Spain) Atlético Madrid	Transfer	€1M	
13 July 2018	(Spain) Rubén Castro	(Spain) Las Palmas	Transfer	Free	
9 August 2018	(Spain) Víctor Camarasa	(Wales) Cardiff City	Loan		
24 August 2018	(Romania) Alin Toșca	(Greece) PAOK	Loan		
31 August 2018	(Spain) Álex Alegría	(Spain) Rayo Vallecano	Loan		
31 August 2018	(Serbia) Darko Brašanac	(Spain) Alavés	Loan		
31 August 2018	(Colombia) Juanjo Narváez	(Spain) Almería	Loan		

=== Real Madrid ===
Manager: (Spain) Julen Lopetegui (1st season)

==== In ====
Date	Player	From	Type	Fee	Ref
5 June 2018	(Austria) Philipp Lienhart	(Germany) SC Freiburg	Loan return		
22 June 2018	(Ukraine) Andriy Lunin	(Ukraine) Zorya Luhansk	Transfer	€8.5M	
30 June 2018	(Portugal) Fábio Coentrão	(Portugal) Sporting CP	Loan return		
30 June 2018	(Spain) Raúl de Tomás	(Spain) Rayo Vallecano	Loan return		
30 June 2018	(Norway) Martin Ødegaard	(Netherlands) Heerenveen	Loan return		
5 July 2018	(Spain) Álvaro Odriozola	(Spain) Real Sociedad	Transfer	€40M	
12 July 2018	(Brazil) Vinícius Júnior	(Brazil) Flamengo	Transfer	€46M	
8 August 2018	(Belgium) Thibaut Courtois	(England) Chelsea	Transfer	€35M	
29 August 2018	(Dominican Republic) Mariano Díaz	(France) Lyon	Transfer	€23M	

==== Out ====
Date	Player	To	Type	Fee	Ref
5 June 2018	(Austria) Philipp Lienhart	(Germany) SC Freiburg	Transfer	€2M	
10 July 2018	(Portugal) Cristiano Ronaldo	(Italy) Juventus	Transfer	€105M	
11 July 2018	(Morocco) Achraf Hakimi	(Germany) Borussia Dortmund	Loan		
8 August 2018	(Croatia) Mateo Kovačić	(England) Chelsea	Loan		
10 August 2018	(France) Théo Hernandez	(Spain) Real Sociedad	Loan		
21 August 2018	(Norway) Martin Ødegaard	(Netherlands) Vitesse	Loan		
24 August 2018	(Spain) Raúl de Tomás	(Spain) Rayo Vallecano	Loan		
27 August 2018	(Ukraine) Andriy Lunin	(Spain) Leganés	Loan		
31 August 2018	(Portugal) Fábio Coentrão	(Portugal) Rio Ave	Transfer	Free	
31 August 2018	(Spain) Borja Mayoral	(Spain) Levante	Loan		

=== Real Sociedad ===
Manager: (Spain) Asier Garitano (1st season)

==== In ====
Date	Player	From	Type	Fee	Ref
27 June 2018	(Spain) Markel Bergara	(Spain) Getafe	Loan return		
30 June 2018	(Spain) Héctor Hernández	(Spain) Alavés	Loan return		
30 June 2018	(Spain) Joseba Zaldúa	(Spain) Leganés	Loan return		
12 July 2018	(Spain) Mikel Merino	(England) Newcastle United	Transfer	€12M	
10 August 2018	(France) Théo Hernandez	(Spain) Real Madrid	Loan		
30 August 2018	(Spain) Sandro Ramírez	(England) Everton	Loan		

==== Out ====
Date	Player	To	Type	Fee	Ref
27 June 2018	(Spain) Markel Bergara	(Spain) Getafe	Transfer	Free	
28 June 2018	(Spain) Toño Ramírez	(Cyprus) AEK Larnaca	Transfer	Free	
30 June 2018	(Spain) Xabi Prieto	Retired			
3 July 2018	(Spain) Sergio Canales	(Spain) Real Betis	Transfer	Free	
5 July 2018	(Spain) Álvaro Odriozola	(Spain) Real Madrid	Transfer	€40M	
6 July 2018	(Spain) Carlos Martínez	(Spain) Oviedo	Transfer	Free	
27 August 2018	(Spain) Alberto de la Bella	(Spain) Las Palmas	Transfer	Free	
29 August 2018	(Spain) Imanol Agirretxe	Retired			
30 August 2018	(Spain) Héctor Hernández	(Spain) Tenerife	Transfer	Free	

=== Sevilla ===
Manager: (Spain) Pablo Machín (1st season)

==== In ====
Date	Player	From	Type	Fee	Ref
27 June 2018	(Spain) Roque Mesa	(Wales) Swansea City	Transfer	£5.4M	
30 June 2018	(Spain) Borja Lasso	(Spain) Osasuna	Loan return		
30 June 2018	(Spain) Juan Muñoz	(Spain) Almería	Loan return		
2 July 2018	(France) Ibrahim Amadou	(France) Lille	Transfer	€15M	
9 July 2018	(Czech Republic) Tomáš Vaclík	(Switzerland) Basel	Transfer	€7M	
23 July 2018	(Spain) Sergi Gómez	(Spain) Celta Vigo	Transfer	€5M	
25 July 2018	(France) Joris Gnagnon	(France) Rennes	Transfer	€15M	
4 August 2018	(Spain) Aleix Vidal	(Spain) Barcelona	Transfer	€8.5M	
11 August 2018	(Portugal) André Silva	(Italy) Milan	Loan		
20 August 2018	(France) Maxime Gonalons	(Italy) Roma	Loan		
31 August 2018	(Netherlands) Quincy Promes	(Russia) Spartak Moscow	Transfer	€20M	

==== Out ====
Date	Player	To	Type	Fee	Ref
7 June 2018	(Argentina) Guido Pizarro	(Mexico) Tigres UANL	Transfer	€8.4M	
27 June 2018	(Spain) Roque Mesa	(Wales) Swansea City	Loan return		
30 June 2018	(France) Lionel Carole	(Turkey) Galatasaray	Loan return		
30 June 2018	(Germany) Johannes Geis	(Germany) Schalke 04	Loan return		
30 June 2018	(Mexico) Miguel Layún	(Portugal) Porto	Loan return		
30 June 2018	(Spain) Sandro Ramírez	(England) Everton	Loan return		
12 July 2018	(France) Clément Lenglet	(Spain) Barcelona	Transfer	€35M	
13 July 2018	(Spain) David Soria	(Spain) Getafe	Transfer	€3M	
28 July 2018	(Spain) Juan Muñoz	(Spain) Alcorcón	Transfer	Free	
1 August 2018	(Argentina) Joaquín Correa	(Italy) Lazio	Transfer	€16M	
9 August 2018	(Spain) Sergio Rico	(England) Fulham	Loan		
14 August 2018	(France) Steven Nzonzi	(Italy) Roma	Transfer	€26.6M	
19 August 2018	(France) Sébastien Corchia	(Portugal) Benfica	Loan		
25 August 2018	(Argentina) Nicolás Pareja	(Mexico) Atlas	Transfer	Free	
31 August 2018	(Brazil) Paulo Henrique Ganso	(France) Amiens	Loan		

=== Valencia ===
Manager: (Spain) Marcelino (2nd season)

==== In ====
Date	Player	From	Type	Fee	Ref
27 April 2018	(Chile) Fabián Orellana	(Spain) Eibar	Loan return		
24 May 2018	(France) Geoffrey Kondogbia	(Italy) Internazionale	Transfer	€25M	
8 June 2018	(Serbia) Uroš Račić	(Serbia) Red Star Belgrade	Transfer	€2.2M	
27 June 2018	(Portugal) João Cancelo	(Italy) Internazionale	Loan return		
28 June 2018	(France) Mouctar Diakhaby	(France) Lyon	Transfer	€15M	
30 June 2018	(Belgium) Zakaria Bakkali	(Spain) Deportivo La Coruña	Loan return		
30 June 2018	(Spain) Nacho Gil	(Spain) Las Palmas	Loan return		
30 June 2018	(Spain) Álvaro Medrán	(Spain) Alavés	Loan return		
30 June 2018	(Portugal) Nani	(Italy) Lazio	Loan return		
10 July 2018	(Denmark) Daniel Wass	(Spain) Celta Vigo	Transfer	€6M	
23 July 2018	(Italy) Cristiano Piccini	(Portugal) Sporting CP	Transfer	€8M	
10 August 2018	(Belgium) Michy Batshuayi	(England) Chelsea	Loan		
13 August 2018	(France) Kevin Gameiro	(Spain) Atlético Madrid	Transfer	€16M	
14 August 2018	(Russia) Denis Cheryshev	(Spain) Villarreal	Loan		
18 August 2018	(Colombia) Jeison Murillo	(Italy) Internazionale	Transfer	€12M	
27 August 2018	(Portugal) Gonçalo Guedes	(France) Paris Saint-Germain	Transfer	€40M	

==== Out ====
Date	Player	To	Type	Fee	Ref
27 April 2018	(Chile) Fabián Orellana	(Spain) Eibar	Transfer	€2M	
24 May 2018	(France) Geoffrey Kondogbia	(Italy) Internazionale	Loan return		
27 June 2018	(Portugal) João Cancelo	(Italy) Juventus	Transfer	€40.4M	
30 June 2018	(Portugal) Gonçalo Guedes	(France) Paris Saint-Germain	Loan return		
30 June 2018	(Brazil) Andreas Pereira	(England) Manchester United	Loan return		
30 June 2018	(Argentina) Luciano Vietto	(Spain) Atlético Madrid	Loan return		
4 July 2018	(Belgium) Zakaria Bakkali	(Belgium) Anderlecht	Transfer	€1.2M	
11 July 2018	(Portugal) Nani	(Portugal) Sporting CP	Transfer	Free	
13 July 2018	(Spain) Nacho Vidal	(Spain) Osasuna	Transfer	Free	
16 July 2018	(Serbia) Nemanja Maksimović	(Spain) Getafe	Transfer	€5M	
9 August 2018	(Spain) Martín Montoya	(England) Brighton & Hove Albion	Transfer	£6.3M	
11 August 2018	(Spain) Álvaro Medrán	(Spain) Rayo Vallecano	Loan		
17 August 2018	(Italy) Simone Zaza	(Italy) Torino	Loan	€2M	
18 August 2018	(Colombia) Jeison Murillo	(Italy) Internazionale	Loan return		

=== Valladolid ===
Manager: (Spain) Sergio González (2nd season)

==== In ====
Date	Player	From	Type	Fee	Ref
30 June 2018	(Spain) Alberto Guitián	(Spain) Sporting Gijón	Loan return		
30 June 2018	(Equatorial Guinea) Iban Salvador	(Spain) Cultural Leonesa	Loan return		
27 July 2018	(Spain) Ivi López	(Spain) Levante	Loan		
28 July 2018	(Spain) Churripi	(Spain) Sevilla Atlético	Transfer	Free	
29 July 2018	(Spain) Keko	(Spain) Málaga	Loan		
3 August 2018	(Spain) Rubén Alcaraz	(Spain) Girona	Transfer	€1M	
8 August 2018	(Italy) Daniele Verde	(Italy) Roma	Loan		
16 August 2018	(Spain) Fede San Emeterio	(Spain) Sevilla Atlético	Transfer	Undisclosed	
19 August 2018	(Croatia) Duje Čop	(Belgium) Standard Liège	Loan		
19 August 2018	(Argentina) Leonardo Suárez	(Spain) Villarreal	Loan		
19 August 2018	(Turkey) Enes Ünal	(Spain) Villarreal	Loan		
30 August 2018	(Spain) Yoel	(Spain) Eibar	Loan		
31 August 2018	(Spain) Joaquín	(Spain) Almería	Transfer	Undisclosed	

==== Out ====
Date	Player	To	Type	Fee	Ref
30 June 2018	(Saudi Arabia) Nooh Al-Mousa	(Saudi Arabia) Al-Fateh	Loan return		
30 June 2018	(Greece) Giannis Gianniotas	(Greece) Olympiacos	Loan return		
30 June 2018	(Spain) Borja Herrera	(Spain) Las Palmas	Loan return		
30 June 2018	(Spain) Pablo Hervías	(Spain) Eibar	Loan return		
30 June 2018	(Spain) Toni Martínez	(England) West Ham United	Loan return		
30 June 2018	(Spain) Javier Ontiveros	(Spain) Málaga	Loan return		
30 June 2018	(Austria) Lukas Rotpuller	TBD		Free	
1 July 2018	(Spain) Deivid	(Spain) Las Palmas	Transfer	Free	
2 July 2018	(Spain) Jaime Mata	(Spain) Getafe	Transfer	Free	
10 July 2018	(Equatorial Guinea) Iban Salvador	(Spain) Celta Vigo B	Transfer	Free	
28 July 2018	(Spain) Churripi	(Spain) Albacete	Loan		
31 July 2018	(Spain) Isaac Becerra	(Spain) Gimnàstic	Transfer	Free	
16 August 2018	(Spain) Fede San Emeterio	(Spain) Granada	Loan		
28 August 2018	(Spain) David Mayoral	(Spain) Alcorcón	Loan		
31 August 2018	(Spain) Antonio Domínguez	(Spain) Sabadell	Loan		
31 August 2018	(Spain) Chris Ramos	(Spain) Sevilla Atlético	Loan		

=== Villarreal ===
Manager: (Spain) Javier Calleja (2nd season)

==== In ====
Date	Player	From	Type	Fee	Ref
6 June 2018	(Cameroon) Karl Toko Ekambi	(France) Angers	Transfer	€18M	
12 June 2018	(Spain) Gerard Moreno	(Spain) Espanyol	Transfer	€20M	
21 June 2018	(Argentina) Ramiro Funes Mori	(England) Everton	Transfer	€20M	
30 June 2018	(Qatar) Akram Afif	(Qatar) Al Sadd	Loan return		
30 June 2018	(Argentina) Cristian Espinoza	(Argentina) Boca Juniors	Loan return		
30 June 2018	(Senegal) Alfred N'Diaye	(England) Wolverhampton Wanderers	Loan return		
30 June 2018	(Spain) Matías Nahuel	(Spain) Barcelona B	Loan return		
30 June 2018	(Spain) Alfonso Pedraza	(Spain) Alavés	Loan return		
11 July 2018	(Mexico) Miguel Layún	(Portugal) Porto	Transfer	€4M	
16 July 2018	(Argentina) Santiago Cáseres	(Argentina) Vélez Sarsfield	Transfer	€10M	
9 August 2018	(Spain) Santi Cazorla	Unattached	Transfer	Free	
17 August 2018	(Colombia) Carlos Bacca	(Italy) Milan	Transfer	€7M	

==== Out ====
Date	Player	To	Type	Fee	Ref
24 May 2018	(Spain) Rodri	(Spain) Atlético Madrid	Transfer	€20M	
13 June 2018	(Colombia) Roger Martínez	(China) Jiangsu Suning	Loan return		
30 June 2018	(Saudi Arabia) Salem Al-Dawsari	(Saudi Arabia) Al-Hilal	Loan return		
30 June 2018	(Colombia) Carlos Bacca	(Italy) Milan	Loan return		
4 July 2018	(Serbia) Antonio Rukavina	(Kazakhstan) Astana	Transfer	Free	
19 July 2018	(Portugal) Rúben Semedo	(Spain) Huesca	Loan		
6 August 2018	(Spain) Pau Torres	(Spain) Málaga	Loan		
9 August 2018	(Spain) Adrián Marín	(Spain) Alavés	Transfer	Undisclosed	
10 August 2018	(Senegal) Alfred N'Diaye	(Spain) Málaga	Loan		
14 August 2018	(Russia) Denis Cheryshev	(Spain) Valencia	Loan		
17 August 2018	(Spain) Samu Castillejo	(Italy) Milan	Transfer	€25M	
17 August 2018	(Italy) Roberto Soriano	(Italy) Torino	Loan	€1M	
19 August 2018	(Argentina) Leonardo Suárez	(Spain) Valladolid	Loan		
19 August 2018	(Turkey) Enes Ünal	(Spain) Valladolid	Loan		
21 August 2018	(Uruguay) Ramiro Guerra	(Spain) Gimnàstic	Loan		
31 August 2018	(Spain) Matías Nahuel	(Greece) Olympiacos	Transfer	Undisclosed	

== Segunda División ==
=== Albacete ===
Manager: (Spain) Luis Miguel Ramis (1st season)

==== In ====
Date	Player	From	Type	Fee	Ref
26 June 2018	(Spain) Iván Sánchez	(Spain) Elche	Loan return		
30 June 2018	(Spain) Isaac Aketxe	(Spain) Cartagena	Loan return		
30 June 2018	(Spain) Fran Carnicer	(Spain) Murcia	Loan return		
30 June 2018	(Costa Rica) Danny Carvajal	(Japan) Tokushima Vortis	Loan return		
30 June 2018	(Spain) Cristian Galas	(Spain) Alcoyano	Loan return		
30 June 2018	(Spain) Eloy Gila	(Spain) Mirandés	Loan return		
30 June 2018	(Spain) Adrián Gómez	(Kazakhstan) Irtysh Pavlodar	Loan return		
30 June 2018	(Spain) Héctor Pizana	(Spain) Guijuelo	Loan return		
1 July 2018	(Albania) Rey Manaj	(Italy) Internazionale	Loan		
4 July 2018	(Uruguay) Mathías Olivera	(Spain) Getafe	Loan		
7 July 2018	(Spain) Fran García	(Spain) Fuenlabrada	Transfer	Free	
10 July 2018	(Spain) Aleix Febas	(Spain) Real Madrid Castilla	Loan		
10 July 2018	(Spain) Álvaro Tejero	(Spain) Real Madrid Castilla	Loan		
23 July 2018	(Martinique) Mickaël Malsa	(Netherlands) Fortuna Sittard	Loan		
23 July 2018	(Spain) Alfredo Ortuño	(United States) Real Salt Lake	Transfer	Free	
27 July 2018	(Spain) José Antonio Caro	(Spain) Córdoba	Transfer	Free	
28 July 2018	(Spain) Churripi	(Spain) Valladolid	Loan		
1 August 2018	(Spain) Eugeni Valderrama	(Spain) Huesca	Loan		
28 August 2018	(Spain) Diego Barri	(Spain) Getafe B	Transfer	Free	
28 August 2018	(Brazil) Paulo Vitor	(Brazil) Vasco da Gama	Loan		
29 August 2018	(Argentina) Santiago Gentiletti	(Italy) Genoa	Transfer	Free	

==== Out ====
Date	Player	To	Type	Fee	Ref
18 June 2018	(Spain) Daniel Rodríguez	(Spain) Mallorca	Transfer	Free	
25 June 2018	(France) Mickaël Gaffoor	(Cyprus) Omonia	Transfer	Free	
26 June 2018	(Spain) Iván Sánchez	(Spain) Elche	Transfer	€150K	
30 June 2018	(Spain) Cifu	(Spain) Málaga	Loan return		
30 June 2018	(Spain) César de la Hoz	(Spain) Real Betis B	Loan return		
30 June 2018	(Spain) Héctor Hernández	(Spain) Atlético Madrid	Loan return		
30 June 2018	(Spain) David Morillas	TBD		Free	
30 June 2018	(Montenegro) Esteban Saveljich	(Spain) Levante	Loan return		
27 July 2018	(Argentina) Mariano Bíttolo	(Argentina) Newell's Old Boys	Loan		

=== Alcorcón ===
Manager: (Spain) Cristóbal Parralo (1st season)

==== In ====
Date	Player	From	Type	Fee	Ref
30 June 2018	(Spain) Borja Lázaro	(Spain) Racing Santander	Loan return		
28 July 2018	(Spain) Juan Muñoz	(Spain) Sevilla	Transfer	Free	
2 August 2018	(Mexico) Diego Cornejo	(Mexico) Necaxa	Transfer	Free	
2 August 2018	(Mexico) Jorge Cornejo	(Mexico) Necaxa	Transfer	Free	
15 August 2018	(Spain) Unai Elgezabal	(Spain) Eibar	Loan		
16 August 2018	(Spain) Rulo Prieto	(Spain) Huesca	Transfer	Free	
28 August 2018	(Spain) David Mayoral	(Spain) Valladolid	Loan		

==== Out ====
Date	Player	To	Type	Fee	Ref
30 June 2018	(Portugal) Bruno Gama	TBD		Free	
30 June 2018	(Argentina) Mateo García	(Spain) Las Palmas	Loan return		
30 June 2018	(Spain) Álvaro Giménez	TBD		Free	
30 June 2018	(Algeria) Foued Kadir	TBD		Free	
30 June 2018	(Spain) César Soriano	TBD		Free	
30 June 2018	(Spain) Pablo Vázquez	(Spain) Granada B	Loan return		
16 August 2018	(Spain) Rulo Prieto	(Spain) Racing Santander	Loan		

=== Almería ===
Manager: (Spain) Fran Fernández (2nd season)

==== In ====
Date	Player	From	Type	Fee	Ref
29 June 2018	(Spain) Samuel de los Reyes	(Sweden) Sundsvall	Transfer	Free	
29 June 2018	(Spain) Adrián Montoro	(Spain) Sporting Gijón B	Transfer	Free	
2 July 2018	(Spain) Álvaro Giménez	(Spain) Alcorcón	Transfer	Free	
3 July 2018	(Spain) José Corpas	(Spain) Marbella	Transfer	Free	
4 July 2018	(Spain) César de la Hoz	(Spain) Real Betis B	Transfer	Free	
12 July 2018	(Spain) José Romera	(Romania) Dinamo București	Transfer	Free	
31 August 2018	(Colombia) Juanjo Narváez	(Spain) Real Betis	Loan		
31 August 2018	(Montenegro) Esteban Saveljich	(Spain) Levante	Loan		

==== Out ====
Date	Player	To	Type	Fee	Ref
18 June 2018	(Spain) Fidel	(Spain) Las Palmas	Transfer	Undisclosed	
30 June 2018	(Spain) Javi Álamo	TBD		Free	
30 June 2018	(Spain) Rubén Alcaraz	(Spain) Girona	Loan return		
30 June 2018	(Guinea) Lass Bangoura	(Spain) Rayo Vallecano	Loan return		
30 June 2018	(Argentina) Tino Costa	TBD		Free	
30 June 2018	(Ecuador) Pervis Estupiñán	(England) Watford	Loan return		
30 June 2018	(The Gambia) Sulayman Marreh	(England) Watford	Loan return		
30 June 2018	(Spain) Jorge Morcillo	TBD		Free	
30 June 2018	(Spain) Juan Muñoz	(Spain) Sevilla	Loan return		
30 June 2018	(Italy) Edoardo Soleri	(Italy) Roma	Loan return		
30 June 2018	(Spain) Verza	(Spain) Levante	Loan return		
27 July 2018	(Spain) José Ángel Pozo	(Spain) Rayo Vallecano	Transfer	€1.5M	
31 August 2018	(Spain) Joaquín	(Spain) Valladolid	Transfer	Undisclosed	

=== Cádiz ===
Manager: (Spain) Álvaro Cervera (4th season)

==== In ====
Date	Player	From	Type	Fee	Ref
25 June 2018	(Spain) Mario Barco	(Spain) Lugo	Transfer	Free	
29 June 2018	(Spain) David Carmona	(Spain) Sevilla Atlético	Transfer	Free	
30 June 2018	(Spain) Eneko Jauregi	(Spain) Córdoba	Loan return		
30 June 2018	(Spain) Tomás Sánchez	(Spain) Toledo	Loan return		
8 August 2018	(Spain) Juan Hernández	(Spain) Celta Vigo	Loan		
29 August 2018	(Spain) Jairo Izquierdo	(Spain) Girona	Loan		

==== Out ====
Date	Player	To	Type	Fee	Ref
15 June 2018	(Netherlands) Lucas Bijker	(Belgium) Mechelen	Transfer	€305K	
30 June 2018	(Comoros) Rafidine Abdullah	TBD		Free	
30 June 2018	(Spain) David Barral	TBD		Free	
30 June 2018	(Honduras) Jona	(Spain) Córdoba	Loan return		
30 June 2018	(Senegal) Khalifa Sankaré	TBD		Free	
30 June 2018	(Spain) Eugeni Valderrama	(Spain) Valencia B	Loan return		
30 June 2018	(Venezuela) Mikel Villanueva	(Spain) Málaga	Loan return		
30 June 2018	(Spain) Rubén Yáñez	(Spain) Getafe	Loan return		
23 August 2018	(Spain) Álvaro García	(Spain) Rayo Vallecano	Transfer	€5M	

=== Córdoba ===
Manager: (Spain) José Ramón Sandoval (1st season)

==== In ====
Date	Player	From	Type	Fee	Ref
30 June 2018	(Honduras) Jona	(Spain) Cádiz	Loan return		
30 June 2018	(Spain) Jaime Romero	(Spain) Lugo	Loan return		

==== Out ====
Date	Player	To	Type	Fee	Ref
6 June 2018	(Spain) José Antonio Reyes	(China) Xinjiang Tianshan Leopard	Transfer	Free	
20 June 2018	(Spain) Josema	(France) Sochaux	Loan		
22 June 2018	(Spain) Sergi Guardiola	(Spain) Getafe	Loan		
30 June 2018	(Spain) José Antonio Caro	TBD		Free	
30 June 2018	(Spain) Eneko Jauregi	(Spain) Cádiz	Loan return		
30 June 2018	(Uruguay) Bruno Montelongo	TBD		Free	
30 June 2018	(Colombia) Juanjo Narváez	(Spain) Real Betis	Loan return		
30 June 2018	(Spain) Javi Noblejas	(Spain) Rayo Vallecano	Loan return		
27 July 2018	(Spain) José Antonio Caro	(Spain) Albacete	Transfer	Free	

=== Deportivo La Coruña ===
Manager: (Spain) Natxo González (1st season)

==== In ====
Date	Player	From	Type	Fee	Ref
26 May 2018	(Spain) Dani Giménez	(Spain) Real Betis	Transfer	Free	
15 June 2018	(Argentina) Sebastián Dubarbier	(Argentina) Estudiantes	Transfer	Free	
28 June 2018	(Spain) Pedro	(Spain) Granada	Transfer	Free	
28 June 2018	(Venezuela) Christian Santos	(Spain) Alavés	Transfer	Free	
30 June 2018	(Spain) Álex Bergantiños	(Spain) Sporting Gijón	Loan return		
30 June 2018	(Spain) Saúl García	(Spain) Numancia	Loan return		
30 June 2018	(Spain) Róber Pier	(Spain) Levante	Loan return		
1 July 2018	(Spain) Pablo Marí	(England) Manchester City	Loan		

==== Out ====
Date	Player	To	Type	Fee	Ref
31 May 2018	(Turkey) Emre Çolak	(Saudi Arabia) Al-Wehda	Transfer	€1M	
8 June 2018	(Romania) Florin Andone	(England) Brighton & Hove Albion	Transfer	£5.4M	
15 June 2018	(Portugal) Luisinho	(Spain) Huesca	Transfer	Free	
30 June 2018	(Belgium) Zakaria Bakkali	(Spain) Valencia	Loan return		
30 June 2018	(Spain) Carles Gil	(England) Aston Villa	Loan return		
30 June 2018	(Ukraine) Maksym Koval	(Ukraine) Dynamo Kyiv	Loan return		
30 June 2018	(Spain) Adrián López	(Portugal) Porto	Loan return		
30 June 2018	(Spain) Rubén Martínez	TBD		Free	
30 June 2018	(Ghana) Sulley Muntari	TBD		Free	
30 June 2018	(Spain) Fernando Navarro	TBD		Free	
30 June 2018	(Spain) Lucas Pérez	(England) Arsenal	Loan return		
30 June 2018	(Uruguay) Federico Valverde	(Spain) Real Madrid Castilla	Loan return		
12 July 2018	(Spain) Juanfran	(Spain) Leganés	Loan		
26 July 2018	(Uruguay) Diego Rolán	(Spain) Leganés	Loan		
2 August 2018	(Brazil) Sidnei	(Spain) Real Betis	Transfer	€4.5M	
24 August 2018	(Nigeria) Francis Uzoho	(Spain) Elche	Loan		

=== Elche ===
Manager: (Spain) Pacheta (2nd season)

==== In ====
Date	Player	From	Type	Fee	Ref
26 June 2018	(Spain) Iván Sánchez	(Spain) Albacete	Transfer	€150K	
5 August 2018	(Venezuela) Alexander González	(Spain) Huesca	Transfer	Free	
24 August 2018	(Nigeria) Francis Uzoho	(Spain) Deportivo La Coruña	Loan		

==== Out ====
Date	Player	To	Type	Fee	Ref
26 June 2018	(Spain) Iván Sánchez	(Spain) Albacete	Loan return		

=== Extremadura ===
Manager: (Spain) Juan Sabas (2nd season)

==== In ====
Date	Player	From	Type	Fee	Ref
14 August 2018	(Spain) Chuli	(Spain) Getafe	Loan		

==== Out ====
Date	Player	To	Type	Fee	Ref
18 August 2018	(Spain) Jairo Izquierdo	(Spain) Girona	Transfer	€200K	

=== Gimnàstic ===
Manager: (Spain) José Antonio Gordillo (2nd season)

==== In ====
Date	Player	From	Type	Fee	Ref
30 July 2018	(Venezuela) Josua Mejías	(Spain) Leganés	Loan		
31 July 2018	(Spain) Isaac Becerra	(Spain) Valladolid	Transfer	Free	
10 August 2018	(Spain) Sebas Coris	(Spain) Girona	Loan		
21 August 2018	(Uruguay) Ramiro Guerra	(Spain) Villarreal	Loan		
28 August 2018	(Spain) Iván López	(Spain) Levante	Loan		
31 August 2018	(North Macedonia) Stole Dimitrievski	(Spain) Rayo Vallecano	Loan		

==== Out ====
Date	Player	To	Type	Fee	Ref
30 June 2018	(Spain) Álvaro Vázquez	(Spain) Espanyol	Loan return		

=== Granada ===
Manager: (Spain) Diego Martínez (1st season)

==== In ====
Date	Player	From	Type	Fee	Ref
27 June 2018	(Spain) Álvaro Vadillo	(Spain) Huesca	Transfer	Free	
30 June 2018	(Spain) Javier Espinosa	(Spain) Levante	Loan return		
30 June 2018	(Spain) Rubén Pérez	(Spain) Leganés	Loan return		
30 June 2018	(Spain) Fran Rico	(Spain) Eibar	Loan return		
9 July 2018	(Spain) Fede Vico	(Spain) Leganés	Loan		
16 August 2018	(Spain) Fede San Emeterio	(Spain) Valladolid	Loan		

==== Out ====
Date	Player	To	Type	Fee	Ref
28 June 2018	(Spain) Pedro	(Spain) Deportivo La Coruña	Transfer	Free	
30 June 2018	(Denmark) Andrew Hjulsager	(Spain) Celta Vigo	Loan return		
30 June 2018	(Spain) Urtzi Iriondo	(Spain) Bilbao Athletic	Loan return		
6 July 2018	(Spain) Rubén Pérez	(Spain) Leganés	Transfer	Free	

=== Las Palmas ===
Manager: (Spain) Manuel Jiménez (1st season)

==== In ====
Date	Player	From	Type	Fee	Ref
15 June 2018	(Argentina) Martín Mantovani	(Spain) Leganés	Transfer	Free	
18 June 2018	(Spain) Fidel	(Spain) Almería	Transfer	Undisclosed	
30 June 2018	(Argentina) Mateo García	(Spain) Alcorcón	Loan return		
30 June 2018	(Spain) Borja Herrera	(Spain) Valladolid	Loan return		
30 June 2018	(France) Loïc Rémy	(Spain) Getafe	Loan return		
1 July 2018	(Spain) Deivid	(Spain) Valladolid	Transfer	Free	
13 July 2018	(Spain) Rubén Castro	(Spain) Real Betis	Transfer	Free	
23 July 2018	(Spain) Raúl Fernández	(Spain) Levante	Transfer	Free	
31 July 2018	(Spain) Christian Rivera	(Spain) Eibar	Transfer	Undisclosed	
27 August 2018	(Spain) Alberto de la Bella	(Spain) Las Palmas	Transfer	Free	
31 August 2018	(Spain) David Timor	(Spain) Girona	Transfer	€1.5M	

==== Out ====
Date	Player	To	Type	Fee	Ref
24 May 2018	(Croatia) Marko Livaja	(Greece) AEK Athens	Transfer	€1.8M	
30 June 2018	(Spain) Álex Gálvez	(Spain) Eibar	Loan return		
30 June 2018	(Spain) Nacho Gil	(Spain) Valencia	Loan return		
4 July 2018	(Argentina) Leandro Chichizola	(Spain) Getafe	Transfer	Free	
6 July 2018	(Spain) Ximo Navarro	(Spain) Alavés	Transfer	Undisclosed	
13 July 2018	(France) Loïc Rémy	(France) Lille	Transfer	€1.4M	
31 July 2018	(Spain) Pedro Bigas	(Spain) Eibar	Loan		

=== Lugo ===
Manager: (Spain) Javi López (1st season)

==== In ====
Date	Player	From	Type	Fee	Ref
15 July 2018	(Spain) Dani Escriche	(Spain) Huesca	Loan		
6 August 2018	(Spain) José Carlos Lazo	(Spain) Getafe	Loan		

==== Out ====
Date	Player	To	Type	Fee	Ref
25 June 2018	(Spain) Mario Barco	(Spain) Cádiz	Transfer	Free	
30 June 2018	(Spain) Chuli	(Spain) Getafe	Loan return		
30 June 2018	(Spain) Álvaro Lemos	(Spain) Celta Vigo	Loan return		
30 June 2018	(Spain) Jaime Romero	(Spain) Córdoba	Loan return		
5 July 2018	(Spain) Fede Vico	(Spain) Leganés	Transfer	Free	
15 July 2018	(Spain) Dani Escriche	(Spain) Huesca	Transfer	€500K	

=== Málaga ===
Manager: (Spain) Juan Muñiz (1st season)

==== In ====
Date	Player	From	Type	Fee	Ref
17 June 2018	(Spain) Jony	(Spain) Sporting Gijón	Loan return		
30 June 2018	(Spain) Cifu	(Spain) Albacete	Loan return		
30 June 2018	(Spain) Javier Ontiveros	(Spain) Valladolid	Loan return		
30 June 2018	(Venezuela) Mikel Villanueva	(Spain) Cádiz	Loan return		
6 August 2018	(Spain) Pau Torres	(Spain) Villarreal	Loan		
10 August 2018	(Senegal) Alfred N'Diaye	(Spain) Villarreal	Loan		
15 August 2018	(Spain) Dani Pacheco	(Spain) Getafe	Transfer	Free	
17 August 2018	(Ivory Coast) Mamadou Koné	(Spain) Leganés	Loan		

==== Out ====
Date	Player	To	Type	Fee	Ref
30 June 2018	(Spain) Samu García	(Spain) Levante	Loan return		
30 June 2018	(Spain) Roberto Jiménez	(Spain) Espanyol	Loan return		
17 June 2018	(Spain) Jony	(Spain) Alavés	Loan		
29 July 2018	(Spain) Keko	(Spain) Valladolid	Loan		
1 August 2018	(Uruguay) Michael Santos	(Spain) Leganés	Loan		
4 August 2018	(Spain) Ignasi Miquel	(Spain) Getafe	Transfer	€3.5M	
17 August 2018	(Morocco) Youssef En-Nesyri	(Spain) Leganés	Transfer	€6M	
31 August 2018	(Spain) Recio	(Spain) Leganés	Transfer	€1.5M	
31 August 2018	(Venezuela) Roberto Rosales	(Spain) Espanyol	Loan		

=== Mallorca ===
Manager: (Spain) Vicente Moreno (2nd season)

==== In ====
Date	Player	From	Type	Fee	Ref
18 June 2018	(Spain) Daniel Rodríguez	(Spain) Albacete	Transfer	Free	
23 August 2018	(Democratic Republic of the Congo) Merveille Ndockyt	(Spain) Getafe	Loan		

==== Out ====
Date	Player	To	Type	Fee	Ref

=== Numancia ===
Manager: (Spain) Aritz López Garai (1st season)

==== In ====
Date	Player	From	Type	Fee	Ref

==== Out ====
Date	Player	To	Type	Fee	Ref
30 June 2018	(Spain) Unai Elgezabal	(Spain) Eibar	Loan return		
30 June 2018	(Spain) Markel Etxeberria	(Spain) Athletic Bilbao	Loan return		
30 June 2018	(Spain) Saúl García	(Spain) Deportivo La Coruña	Loan return		
30 June 2018	(Spain) Pere Milla	(Spain) Eibar	Loan return		
23 July 2018	(Spain) Aitor Fernández	(Spain) Levante	Transfer	€1M	

=== Osasuna ===
Manager: (Spain) Jagoba Arrasate (1st season)

==== In ====
Date	Player	From	Type	Fee	Ref
13 July 2018	(Spain) Nacho Vidal	(Spain) Valencia	Transfer	Free	
20 August 2018	(Spain) Rubén García	(Spain) Levante	Transfer	Free	

==== Out ====
Date	Player	To	Type	Fee	Ref
30 June 2018	(Spain) Sebas Coris	(Spain) Girona	Loan return		
30 June 2018	(Spain) Robert Ibáñez	(Spain) Getafe	Loan return		
30 June 2018	(Spain) Borja Lasso	(Spain) Sevilla	Loan return		

=== Oviedo ===
Manager: (Spain) Juan Antonio Anquela (2nd season)

==== In ====
Date	Player	From	Type	Fee	Ref
6 July 2018	(Spain) Carlos Martínez	(Spain) Real Sociedad	Transfer	Free	
12 July 2018	(Spain) Javier Muñoz	(Spain) Alavés	Loan		
28 August 2018	(Mexico) Oswaldo Alanís	(Spain) Getafe	Transfer	Free	

==== Out ====
Date	Player	To	Type	Fee	Ref

=== Rayo Majadahonda ===
Manager: (Spain) Antonio Iriondo (7th season)

==== In ====
Date	Player	From	Type	Fee	Ref
13 July 2018	(Spain) Ernesto Galán	(Spain) Rayo Vallecano	Transfer	Free	
23 July 2018	(Spain) Luso	(Spain) Huesca	Transfer	Free	
31 August 2018	(Spain) Verza	(Spain) Levante	Transfer	Free	

==== Out ====
Date	Player	To	Type	Fee	Ref
6 July 2018	(Morocco) Ayoub Abou	(Spain) Getafe	Transfer	Free	

=== Reus ===
Manager: (Spain) Xavi Bartolo (1st season)

==== In ====
Date	Player	From	Type	Fee	Ref
31 July 2018	(France) Karim Yoda	(Spain) Getafe	Transfer	Free	

==== Out ====
Date	Player	To	Type	Fee	Ref
6 June 2018	(Spain) Jorge Miramón	(Spain) Huesca	Transfer	Free	
30 June 2018	(Spain) Borja Fernández	(Spain) Celta Vigo	Loan return		
30 June 2018	(France) Karim Yoda	(Spain) Getafe	Loan return		

=== Sporting Gijón ===
Manager: (Spain) Rubén Baraja (2nd season)

==== In ====
Date	Player	From	Type	Fee	Ref
25 June 2018	(Spain) Francisco Molinero	(Spain) Getafe	Transfer	Free	
20 August 2018	(Spain) Javi Noblejas	(Spain) Rayo Vallecano	Transfer	Free	
22 August 2018	(Spain) Álvaro Jiménez	(Spain) Getafe	Loan		

==== Out ====
Date	Player	To	Type	Fee	Ref
12 June 2018	(Spain) Óscar Whalley	(Denmark) AGF	Transfer	Free	
17 June 2018	(Spain) Jony	(Spain) Málaga	Loan return		
30 June 2018	(Spain) Álex Bergantiños	(Spain) Deportivo La Coruña	Loan return		
30 June 2018	(Spain) Rubén García	(Spain) Sporting Gijón	Loan return		
30 June 2018	(Spain) Moi Gómez	(Spain) Huesca	Loan return		
30 June 2018	(Spain) Alberto Guitián	(Spain) Valladolid	Loan return		
30 June 2018	(Spain) Nano Mesa	(Spain) Eibar	Loan return		
26 July 2018	(Spain) Sergio Álvarez	(Spain) Eibar	Transfer	€4M	

=== Tenerife ===
Manager: (Spain) Joseba Etxeberria (2nd season)

==== In ====
Date	Player	From	Type	Fee	Ref
4 August 2018	(Spain) Nano	(Spain) Eibar	Loan		
30 August 2018	(Spain) Héctor Hernández	(Spain) Real Sociedad	Transfer	Free	

==== Out ====
Date	Player	To	Type	Fee	Ref

=== Zaragoza ===
Manager: (Spain) Imanol Idiakez (1st season)

==== In ====
Date	Player	From	Type	Fee	Ref
12 June 2018	(Spain) Diego Aguirre	(Spain) Rayo Vallecano	Transfer	Free	
23 August 2018	(Spain) Álvaro Vázquez	(Spain) Espanyol	Loan		

==== Out ====
Date	Player	To	Type	Fee	Ref
