= Akapo =

Akapo is an Equatoguinean surname. Notable people with the surname include:

- Carlos Akapo (born 1993), Equatoguinean footballer
- Javier Akapo (born 1996), Equatoguinean footballer
- Jorge Akapo (born 1992), Equatoguinean futsal and football player
