= 2016–17 SD Huesca season =

SD Huesca
2016–17 season
- Chairman: Agustín Lasaosa
- Manager: Juan Antonio Anquela
- Stadium: El Alcoraz
- Segunda División: 6th
Home colours

The 2016–17 season is the 57th season in SD Huesca ’s history.

== Squad ==
As of 26 January 2017

Note: Flags indicate national team as defined under FIFA eligibility rules; some limited exceptions apply. Players may hold more than one non-FIFA nationality.

No.	Pos.	Nation	Player
1	GK	(Spain) ESP	Sergio Herrera
2	DF	(Spain) ESP	Jair Amador
4	DF	(Spain) ESP	Carlos David (2nd captain)
5	MF	(Spain) ESP	Juan Aguilera
7	FW	(Spain) ESP	David Ferreiro
8	MF	(Spain) ESP	Gonzalo Melero
9	FW	(Spain) ESP	Borja Lázaro
10	MF	(Spain) ESP	Juanjo Camacho (Captain)
11	FW	(Brazil) BRA	Vinícius Araújo (on loan from Valencia)
12	MF	(France) FRA	Franck-Yves Bambock
13	GK	(Spain) ESP	Queco Piña
14	FW	(Spain) ESP	Samu Sáiz

No.	Pos.	Nation	Player
15	DF	(Equatorial Guinea) EQG	Carlos Akapo
16	DF	(Spain) ESP	César Soriano
17	MF	(Spain) ESP	Álvaro Vadillo
19	MF	(Venezuela) VEN	Alexander González
20	DF	(Serbia) SRB	Rajko Brežančić
21	DF	(Spain) ESP	Íñigo López (4th captain)
22	MF	(Spain) ESP	Lluís Sastre
23	MF	(Spain) ESP	David López
24	DF	(Spain) ESP	Nagore (3rd captain)
25	GK	(Spain) ESP	Javi Jiménez
26	FW	(Spain) ESP	Kilian Grant

== Competitions ==
=== Overall ===
Competition	Final position
Segunda División	6th
Copa del Rey	Round of 32

=== Liga ===
==== League table ====
Pos	Team	Pld	W	D	L	GF	GA	GD	Pts	Promotion, qualification or relegation
4	Tenerife	42	16	18	8	50	37	+13	66	Qualification to promotion play-offs
5	Cádiz	42	16	16	10	55	40	+15	64	Qualification to promotion play-offs
6	Huesca	42	16	15	11	53	43	+10	63 (Note: Huesca finished ahead of Valladolid on head-to-head points: Valladolid 1–2 Huesca, Huesca 1–0 Valladolid)	Qualification to promotion play-offs
7	Valladolid	42	18	9	15	52	47	+5	63	
8	Oviedo	42	17	10	15	47	47	0	61	

Source: La Liga
Rules for classification: 1) points; 2) head-to-head points; 3) head-to-head goal difference; 4) goal difference; 5) number of goals scored
