= Karim Coulibaly (footballer, born 1993) =

Footballer (born 1993)

Personal information
- Full name: Abdou Karim Coulibaly
- Date of birth: 3 June 1993 (age 33)
- Place of birth: Bakel, Senegal
- Height: 1.84 m (6 ft 0 in)
- Position: Left winger

Team information
- Current team: Épinal
- Number: 11

Youth career
- 1999–2008: US Villejuif
- 2008–2011: Nancy

Senior career*
Years	Team	Apps	(Gls)
2012–2017	Nancy B	45	(10)
2013–2017	Nancy	77	(10)
2017–2020	Willem II	7	(0)
2020	Toulon	1	(0)
2020–2021	Orléans	2	(0)
2020–2021	Orléans B	1	(1)
2021–	Épinal	112	(25)

International career
2011	France U18	2	(0)
2012	France U19	2	(0)
2012–2013	France U20	4	(0)
- * Club domestic league appearances and goals as of 09:55, 7 April 2026 (UTC)

Abdou Karim Coulibaly (born 3 June 1993) is a professional footballer who plays as a left winger for Championnat National 1 club Épinal. Born in Senegal, he has represented France at youth level.

== Career ==
Born in Bakel, Senegal, Coulibaly signed for the AS Nancy training centre aged 14, whilst training at US Villejuif. He signed his first professional contract, of three years duration, in 2013. His first team debut came as a substitute in a 0–3 Ligue 1 defeat to Saint-Étienne on 23 February 2013. He scored his first senior goal on 26 October 2013 in the Ligue 2 game against Caen.

In June 2017, Coulibaly left Nancy to play for Willem II in the Dutch Eredivisie.

Coulibaly returned to France in January 2020, signing with Sporting Club Toulon, but only managed one appearance due to the premature end to the season. He was subsequently released and, in August 2020 signed for Championnat National side US Orléans. In November 2021, he joined SAS Épinal.

Coulibaly also played youth international football for France.

== Personal life ==
His brothers Mohamed, Ibrahim and Aly are also footballers.
