= Carlos Akapo =

Equatoguinean footballer (born 1993)

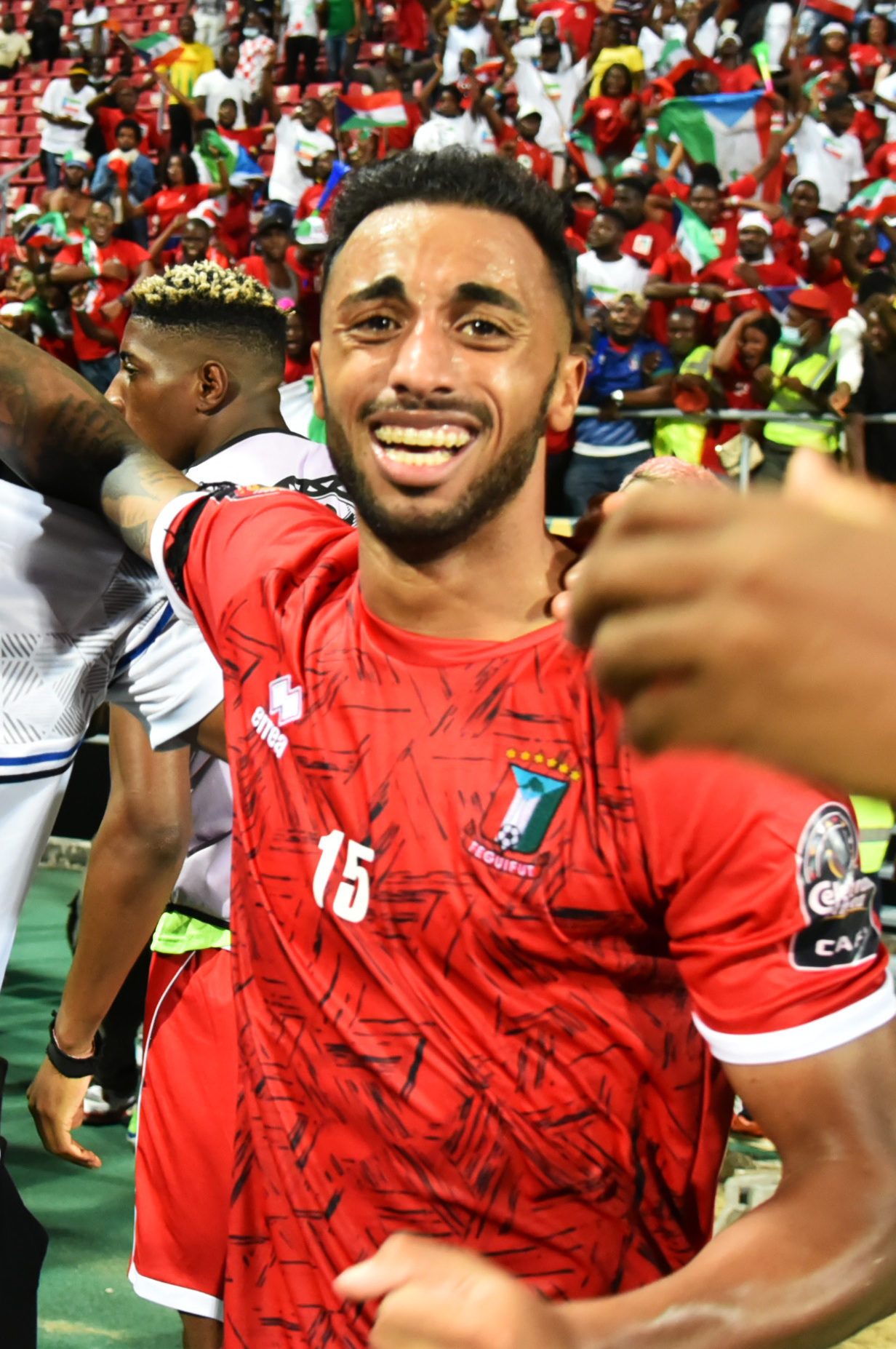
- Akapo with Equatorial Guinea in 2022

Personal information
- Full name: Carlos Akapo Martínez
- Date of birth: 12 March 1993 (age 33)
- Place of birth: Elche, Spain
- Height: 1.79 m (5 ft 10 in)
- Position: Right-back

Team information
- Current team: Johor Darul Ta'zim
- Number: 29

Youth career
- 1998–2008: Kelme
- 2008–2009: Hércules
- 2009–2011: Elche
- 2011–2012: Huracán

Senior career*
Years	Team	Apps	(Gls)
2012–2013	Huracán	24	(0)
2013–2014	Numancia	29	(0)
2014–2016	Valencia B	39	(0)
2016–2019	Huesca	61	(0)
2019–2022	Cádiz	45	(1)
2022–2024	San Jose Earthquakes	50	(2)
2025	Amazonas	20	(1)
2026–	Johor Darul Ta'zim	0	(0)

International career^{‡}
2013–	Equatorial Guinea	47	(2)
- * Club domestic league appearances and goals as of 15:35, 19 November 2025 (UTC) ‡ National team caps and goals as of 17:45, 28 December 2025 (UTC)

Carlos Akapo Martínez (born 12 March 1993) is a professional footballer who plays as a right-back for Malaysia Super League club Johor Darul Ta'zim. Born in Spain, he represents Equatorial Guinea at international level.

== Club career ==
Akapo was born in Elche, Province of Alicante, to an Equatoguinean father and a Spanish mother. He played youth football for four clubs, including Hércules and Elche, and finished his development also in the Valencian Community at Huracán. He made his senior debut with the latter on 22 January 2012, in a 2–1 home loss against Mallorca B.

On 11 July 2013, Akapo signed a two-year contract with Segunda División side Numancia. His first game as a professional took place on 25 August, as he started in a 4–2 home win over Real Jaén.

On 6 August 2014, Akapo joined Valencia and was assigned to the reserves in the third tier. After two seasons of relative playing time, he returned to division two after agreeing to a three-year deal at Huesca on 14 June 2016.

Akapo was regularly used in the following campaigns, and contributed 20 appearances in 2017–18 as the club achieved a first-ever promotion to La Liga. He made his debut in the competition on 25 September 2018, coming on as a substitute for Luisinho in a 3–0 defeat at Atlético Madrid.

On 20 June 2019, after suffering immediate relegation, Akapo signed a three-year contract with Cádiz of the second division, as a free agent. He featured sparingly in his first season at the Estadio Ramón de Carranza, in a promotion as runners-up.

Akapo scored his first goal in the Spanish top tier – also his first as a senior – on 21 May 2021, his team's second in the 2–2 away draw against Levante. On 5 August 2022, he joined Major League Soccer side San Jose Earthquakes on a one-and-a-half-year deal.

On 14 February 2025, Akapo moved to the Campeonato Brasileiro Série B with Amazonas. In August 2026, the 33-year-old joined Malaysia Super League's Johor Darul Ta'zim.

== International career ==
Akapo received his first call from Equatorial Guinea in late August 2012, for a 2013 Africa Cup of Nations qualifying match against Congo DR the following month. He did not leave the bench in the 4–0 loss, making his debut on 5 June 2013 in a friendly with Togo.

Akapo's first major tournament was the 2021 Africa Cup of Nations, delayed due to the COVID-19 pandemic. He played all the minutes but one in Cameroon to help his team reach the quarter-finals; in the round of 16 against Mali, he converted his attempt in the penalty shootout.

== Personal life ==
Akapo's younger brother, Javier, is also a defender and an international for Equatorial Guinea.

== Career statistics ==
=== Club ===
As of match played 25 October 2023

Appearances and goals by club, season and competition
Club	Season	League			National cup		Other		Total	
Club	Season	Division	Apps	Goals	Apps	Goals	Apps	Goals	Apps	Goals
Huracán	2011–12	Segunda División B	3	0	0	0	—		3	0
Huracán	2012–13	Segunda División B	21	0	0	0	2 (Note: Appearances in Segunda División B play-offs)	0	23	0
Huracán	Total		24	0	0	0	2	0	26	0
Numancia	2013–14	Segunda División	29	0	1	0	—		30	0
Valencia B	2014–15	Segunda División B	11	0	—		—		11	0
Valencia B	2015–16	Segunda División B	28	0	—		—		28	0
Valencia B	Total		39	0	0	0	0	0	39	0
Huesca	2016–17	Segunda División	28	0	3	0	2 (Note: Appearances in La Liga play-offs)	0	33	0
Huesca	2017–18	Segunda División	20	0	1	0	—		21	0
Huesca	2018–19	La Liga	13	0	1	0	—		14	0
Huesca	Total		61	0	5	0	2	0	68	0
Cádiz	2019–20	Segunda División	7	0	2	0	—		9	0
Cádiz	2020–21	La Liga	13	1	3	0	—		16	1
Cádiz	2021–22	La Liga	25	0	2	0	1	0	28	0
Cádiz	Total		45	1	7	0	1	0	53	1
San Jose Earthquakes	2023	Major League Soccer	29	2	0	0	2	0	31	2
Career total			227	3	13	0	7	0	247	3

=== International ===
As of match played 28 December 2025

Appearances and goals by national team and year
National team	Year	Apps	Goals
Equatorial Guinea	2013	3	0
Equatorial Guinea	2015	4	0
Equatorial Guinea	2016	4	1
Equatorial Guinea	2018	2	0
Equatorial Guinea	2019	1	0
Equatorial Guinea	2020	2	0
Equatorial Guinea	2021	6	0
Equatorial Guinea	2022	5	0
Equatorial Guinea	2023	5	0
Equatorial Guinea	2024	10	1
Equatorial Guinea	2025	5	0
Total		47	2

As of 9 January 2024
Scores and results list Equatorial Guinea's goal tally first, score column indicates score after each Akapo goal.

List of international goals scored by Carlos Akapo
No.	Date	Venue	Cap	Opponent	Score	Result	Competition
1	4 September 2016	Estadio de Malabo, Malabo, Equatorial Guinea	10	South Sudan	4–0	4–0	2017 Africa Cup of Nations qualification
2	9 January 2024	Estadio de Malabo, Malabo, Equatorial Guinea	33	Djibouti	1–0	1–1	Friendly
