= Javier Akapo =

Equatoguinean footballer (born 1996)

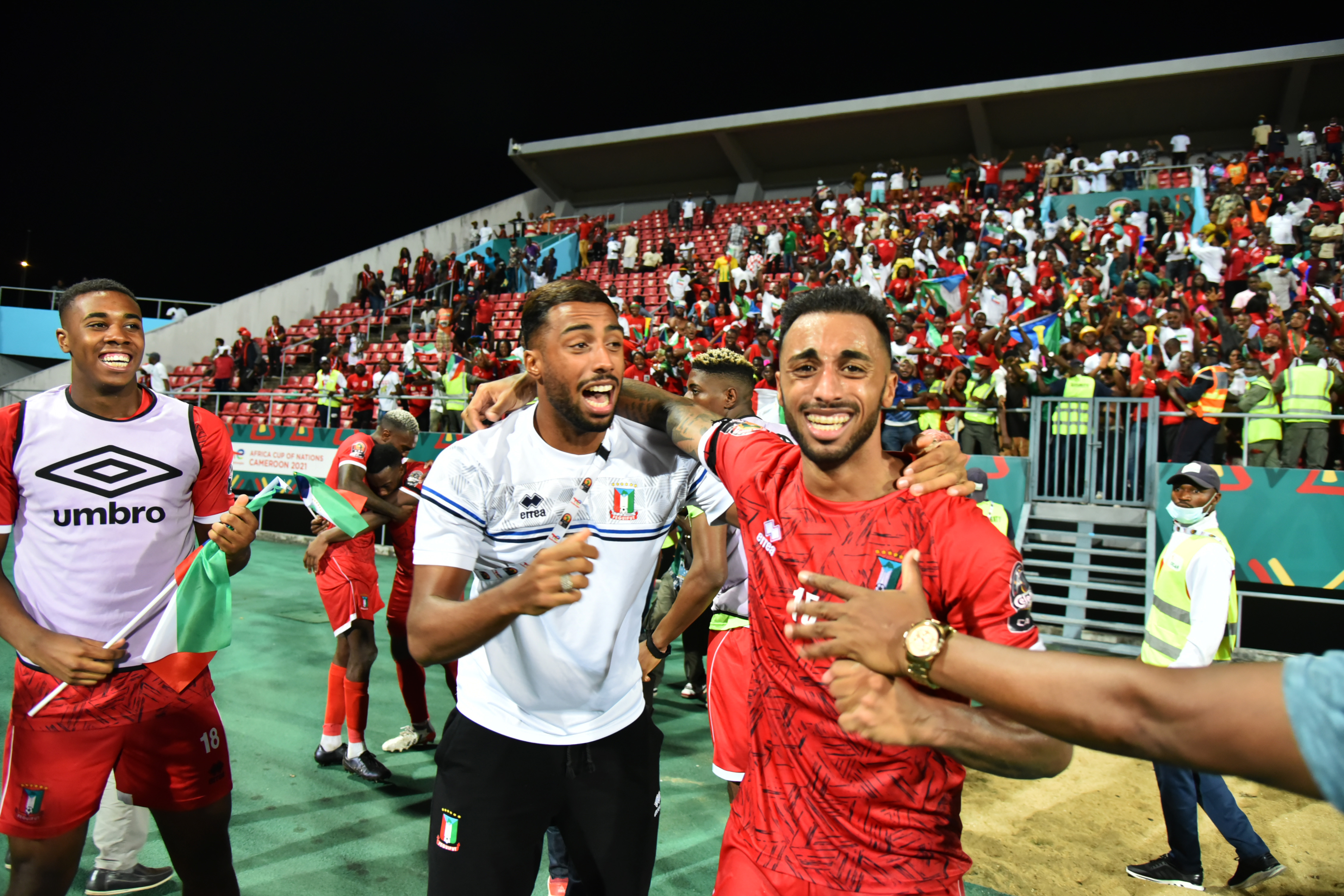
- Akapo with Equatorial Guinea in 2022

Personal information
- Full name: Javier Akapo Martínez
- Date of birth: 3 September 1996 (age 30)
- Place of birth: Elche, Spain
- Height: 1.88 m (6 ft 2 in)
- Positions: Midfielder; centre-back

Team information
- Current team: Moscardó

Senior career*
Years	Team	Apps	(Gls)
2015–2016	Cox	19	(0)
2016–2017	Binéfar	2	(0)
2017–2018	Ilicitana	30	(0)
2018	Intercity	18	(0)
2018–2019	Torrevieja	4	(0)
2019–2020	Redován	22	(0)
2020–2021	Crevillente	26	(0)
2021–2022	Ibiza	20	(0)
2022–2024	Montijo	17	(1)
2024–2025	Móstoles URJC	16	(0)
2025–	Moscardó	0	(0)

International career^{‡}
2015	Equatorial Guinea U20	2	(0)
2021–	Equatorial Guinea	2	(0)
- * Club domestic league appearances and goals as of 13 April 2025 ‡ National team caps and goals as of 6 June 2022

Javier Akapo Martínez (born 3 September 1996) is a footballer who plays as a midfielder and centre-back for Segunda Federación club Moscardó. Born in Spain, he plays for the Equatorial Guinea national team.

== Early life ==
Akapo was born in Spain to an Equatoguinean father and Spanish mother.

== Club career ==
In July 2025, Akapo signed for Moscardó.

== International career ==
Akapo represented Equatorial Guinea at the 2015 COTIF Tournament. He debuted with the senior Equatorial Guinea national team in a 1–1 2022 FIFA World Cup qualification tie with Mauritania on 16 November 2021.

== Personal life ==
Akapo is the younger brother of the professional footballer Carlos Akapo.
