= Ander Bardají =

Spanish footballer (born 1995)

Personal information
- Full name: Ander Bardají Maiza
- Date of birth: 3 May 1995 (age 31)
- Place of birth: Lasarte, Spain
- Height: 1.92 m (6 ft 3 1/2 in)
- Position: Goalkeeper

Youth career
- Real Sociedad

Senior career*
Years	Team	Apps	(Gls)
2012–2016	Real Sociedad B	74	(0)
2016–2017	Real Sociedad	0	(0)
2017–2020	Huesca	0	(0)
2018–2019	→ Fuenlabrada (loan)	2	(0)
2019–2020	→ Ejea (loan)	5	(0)

International career
2013	Spain U19	1	(0)
- * Club domestic league appearances and goals as of 8 March 2020

Ander Bardají Maiza (born 3 May 1995) is a Spanish professional footballer who plays as a goalkeeper.

== Club career ==
Born in Lasarte-Oria, Gipuzkoa, Basque Country, Bardají graduated with Real Sociedad's youth setup. On 1 September 2012, aged only 17, he made his debut as a senior, appearing with the reserves in a 2–1 home win against Real Zaragoza B in the Segunda División B championship.

Bardají was definitely promoted to the B-side on 17 July 2013, after already making seven appearances for it in the previous campaign. On 16 April of the following year he renewed his link with the Txuri-urdin, signing until 2018.

Initially promoted to the main squad for the 2014–15 season after the departure of Claudio Bravo to FC Barcelona, Bardají was only named third-choice due to the arrival of Gerónimo Rulli. After Eñaut Zubikarai's release in June 2015, he was called up to the first team by manager David Moyes for the pre-season, but was only utilized for the B-side after the signing of Oier Olazábal.

Bardají was definitely promoted to the main squad ahead of the 2016–17 campaign, but remained as a backup to Rulli and new signing Toño Ramírez. On 24 July 2017 he cut ties with Real, and signed a three-year deal with Segunda División side SD Huesca just hours later.

Bardají made his professional debut on 6 September 2017, starting in a 0–2 home loss against Real Valladolid, for the season's Copa del Rey. He achieved promotion to La Liga at the end of the campaign, but acting as a third-choice behind Álex Remiro and Roberto Santamaría.

On 14 August 2018, Bardají was loaned to CF Fuenlabrada in the third division for one year, but spent the campaign as a backup to Biel Ribas as his side achieved promotion to the second level. The following 31 July, he moved to fellow third tier side SD Ejea also in a temporary deal.

== Career statistics ==
As of match played 8 March 2020Ander Bardají at Soccerway (archived)

Appearances and goals by club, season and competition
Club	Season	League			National cup		Continental		Other		Total	
Club	Season	Division	Apps	Goals	Apps	Goals	Apps	Goals	Apps	Goals	Apps	Goals
Real Sociedad B	2012–13	Segunda División B	7	0	—		—		—		7	0
Real Sociedad B	2013–14	Segunda División B	18	0	—		—		—		18	0
Real Sociedad B	2014–15	Segunda División B	26	0	—		—		—		26	0
Real Sociedad B	2015–16	Segunda División B	23	0	—		—		—		23	0
Real Sociedad B	Total		74	0	—		—		—		74	0
Real Sociedad	2014–15	La Liga	0	0	0	0	0	0	—		0	0
Real Sociedad	2015–16	La Liga	0	0	0	0	0	0	—		0	0
Real Sociedad	2016–17	La Liga	0	0	0	0	—		—		0	0
Real Sociedad	Total		0	0	0	0	0	0	—		0	0
Huesca	2017–18	Segunda División	0	0	1	0	—		—		1	0
Fuenlabrada (loan)	2018–19	Segunda División B	2	0	2	0	—		2	0	6	0
Ejea (loan)	2019–20	Segunda División B	5	0	—		—		—		5	0
Career total			183	0	19	0	18	0	2	0	222	0
