= Aly Coulibaly =

French footballer (born 1996)

Personal information
- Date of birth: 8 April 1996 (age 30)
- Place of birth: Paris, France
- Height: 1.85 m (6 ft 1 in)
- Position: Midfielder

Team information
- Current team: Lincoln Red Imps
- Number: 17

Youth career
- Tours
- 2014–2015: Bournemouth

Senior career*
Years	Team	Apps	(Gls)
2015–2016	Almudévar	34	(9)
2016–2017	Huesca	1	(0)
2016–2017	→ Badalona (loan)	12	(0)
2017–2019	Badalona	37	(2)
2019	Calahorra	2	(0)
2019–2020	Schaffhausen	17	(0)
2020–2022	Linense	54	(9)
2022–2023	S.S. Reyes	29	(1)
2023–2024	Västerås SK	8	(0)
2024–2025	Amorebieta	25	(2)
2025–2026	TPS	8	(0)
2026–	Lincoln Red Imps	1	(0)
- * Club domestic league appearances and goals as of 30 August 2026

Aly Coulibaly (born 8 April 1996) is a French footballer who plays as a midfielder for Gibraltarian club Lincoln Red Imps.

== Club career ==
A Tours FC youth graduate, Paris-born Coulibaly joined Bournemouth's development squad on 23 July 2014 on a one-year deal, after impressing on a trial. On 27 August 2015, he switched clubs and countries again by signing for SD Huesca and being assigned to its farm team in Tercera División.

On 4 June 2016 Coulibaly made his professional debut, coming on as a late substitute for goalscorer Tyronne del Pino in a 1–0 Segunda División home win against CD Lugo. On 14 August, he was loaned to Segunda División B club CF Badalona, for one year.

On 31 January 2019, Coulibaly joined CD Calahorra.

In August 2023, Coulibaly joined Swedish Superettan club Västerås SK.

On 19 August 2024, Coulibaly returned to Spain and signed with Amorebieta in the third tier.

On 18 August 2025, Coulibaly signed with Finnish Ykkösliiga club TPS.

== Personal life ==
Coulibaly's brothers Karim, Ibrahim and Mohamed are also professional footballers.
