= Álex Gallar =

Spanish footballer

Personal information
- Full name: Alejandro Gallar Falguera
- Date of birth: 19 March 1992 (age 34)
- Place of birth: Terrassa, Spain
- Height: 1.78 m (5 ft 10 in)
- Positions: Winger; forward

Team information
- Current team: Lugo
- Number: 5

Youth career
- Terrassa
- 2010–2011: Mallorca

Senior career*
Years	Team	Apps	(Gls)
2009–2010	Terrassa	10	(2)
2011–2012	Mallorca B	19	(1)
2012–2013	Murcia B	11	(1)
2013	Rubí	16	(6)
2013–2014	Terrassa	37	(12)
2014–2015	Cornellà	35	(8)
2015–2016	Hércules	31	(6)
2016–2017	Cultural Leonesa	35	(17)
2017–2019	Huesca	63	(13)
2019–2022	Girona	32	(0)
2020–2022	→ Cartagena (loan)	59	(5)
2022–2023	Málaga	19	(1)
2023–2026	Ibiza	78	(16)
2026–	Lugo	17	(1)
- * Club domestic league appearances and goals as of 9 June 2026

Alejandro "Álex" Gallar Falguera (born 19 March 1992) is a Spanish footballer who plays as either a left winger or a forward for Primera Federación club Lugo.

== Club career ==
Born in Terrassa, Barcelona, Catalonia, Gallar was a Terrassa FC youth graduate. He made his senior debut on 8 December 2009, coming on as a second-half substitute in a 0–2 Segunda División B away loss against UE Lleida.

Gallar scored his first senior goal on 14 April 2010, netting his team's first in a 2–1 home win against Orihuela CF. On 19 June of that year he moved to RCD Mallorca, returning to youth football; he was promoted to the reserves ahead of the 2011–12 season.

On 2 August 2012, after being sparingly used, Gallar signed for another reserve team, Real Murcia Imperial in Tercera División. The following January, he moved to fellow league team UE Rubí.

On 28 May 2013, Gallar returned to Terrassa and the third division, after agreeing to a one-year deal. After spells at UE Cornellà and Hércules CF, he moved to Cultural y Deportiva Leonesa on 8 July 2016.

Gallar was a key unit in Cultu's promotion to Segunda División, scoring a career-best 20 goals. On 10 July 2017, he signed a three-year deal with SD Huesca in the second division, for a fee of €400,000.

Gallar made his professional debut on 19 August 2017, starting in a 0–1 loss at CD Numancia. His first goal came on 10 October, in a 1–1 home draw against CF Reus Deportiu; he ended the campaign as a starter, netting eight times as his side achieved a first-ever promotion to La Liga.

Gallar made his debut in the main category of Spanish football on 19 August 2018, starting and scoring a brace in a 2–1 away defeat of SD Eibar. He finished 2018–19 with four goals in 25 appearances (only ten starts, however), as his side was immediately relegated back.

On 21 August 2019, Gallar agreed to a four-year contract with Girona FC in the second level. On 25 September of the following year, he moved to fellow league team FC Cartagena on loan for the 2020–21 season; his loan with the Efesé was renewed for the 2021–22 campaign.

Gallar rescinded with Girona on 14 July 2022, and signed a two-year deal with second division side Málaga CF the following day. On 30 June of the following year, after the club's relegation, he left after activating an exit clause on his contract. On 9 August 2023, he joined Ibiza.

On 13 January 2026, Gallar moved to Lugo in Primera Federación.

== International career ==
In March 2019, Gallar was called up to the Catalonia representative team for a friendly against Venezuela. However, Huesca refused to let him and Enric Gallego take part in the match.
