= Álex Remiro =

Spanish footballer

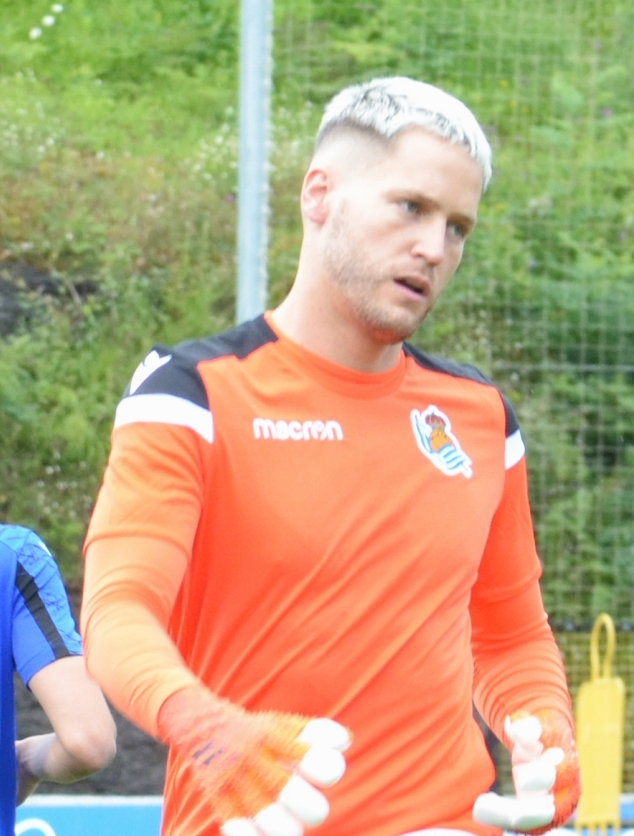
- Remiro with Real Sociedad in 2021

Personal information
- Full name: Alejandro Remiro Gargallo
- Date of birth: 24 March 1995 (age 31)
- Place of birth: Cascante, Spain
- Height: 1.92 m (6 ft 4 in)
- Position: Goalkeeper

Team information
- Current team: Real Sociedad
- Number: 1

Youth career
- Aluvión
- 2009–2013: Athletic Bilbao

Senior career*
| Years | Team | Apps | (Gls) |
| 2012–2014 | Basconia | 28 | (0) |
| 2014–2016 | Bilbao Athletic | 50 | (0) |
| 2016–2019 | Athletic Bilbao | 0 | (0) |
| 2016–2017 | → Levante (loan) | 4 | (0) |
| 2017–2018 | → Huesca (loan) | 41 | (0) |
| 2019– | Real Sociedad | 256 | (0) |

International career
| 2013–2014 | Spain U19 | 5 | (0) |
| 2024 | Spain | 2 | (0) |
Medal record
Men's football
Representing Spain
UEFA European Championship
| Winner | 2024 Germany | Team |
UEFA Nations League
| Runner-up | 2025 Germany | Team |
- * Club domestic league appearances and goals as of 20:25, 1 November 2026 (UTC)

Alejandro "Álex" Remiro Gargallo (born 24 March 1995) is a Spanish professional footballer who plays as a goalkeeper for La Liga club Real Sociedad and the Spain national team.

Developed at Athletic Bilbao, he played as a senior with Basconia, Bilbao Athletic, Levante, Huesca and Real Sociedad. He won the Copa del Rey in 2020 and 2026 with the latter club, totalling more than 300 appearances.

Remiro made his full debut with Spain in 2024, being part of the squad that won Euro 2024.

== Club career ==
=== Athletic Bilbao ===
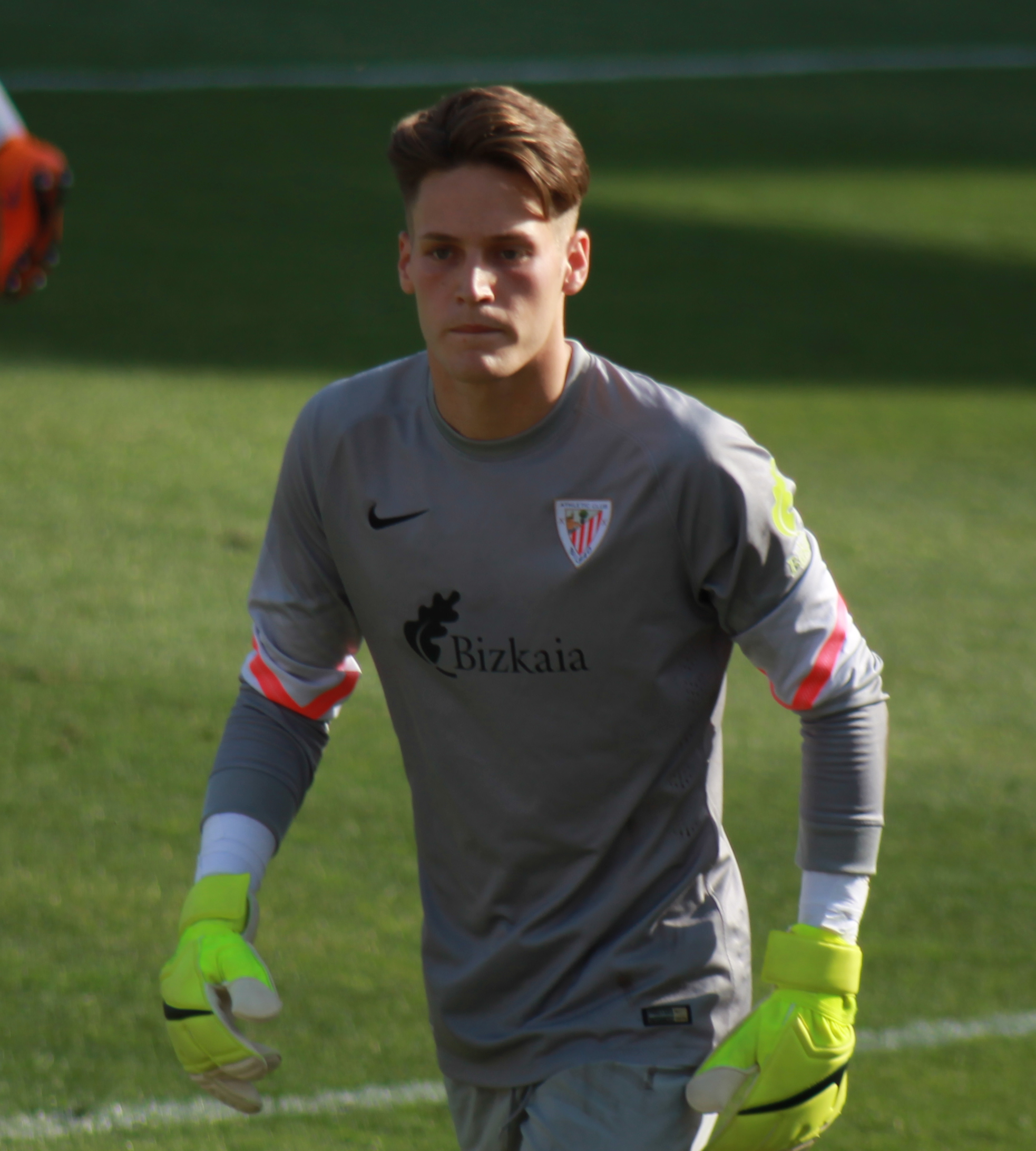
Remiro playing for Bilbao Athletic in 2015

Born in Cascante, Navarre, Remiro joined Athletic Bilbao's youth system in 2009, aged 14. He made his debut as a senior with the farm team in the 2012–13 season, in the Tercera División.

On 26 May 2014, Remiro was promoted to the reserves in the Segunda División B. He was named first choice after the departure of Kepa Arrizabalaga in January, and finished the campaign with 23 appearances – play-offs included – as they returned to Segunda División after a 19-year absence.

Remiro made his professional debut on 24 August 2015, starting in a 0–1 home loss against Girona FC. In June 2016, he was promoted to the first team in La Liga.

Remiro was loaned to second-tier side Levante UD on 1 July 2016, for one year. He was recalled by his parent club late into the following transfer window, however, due to an injury to Kepa.

On 21 July 2017, Remiro moved to SD Huesca on a one-year loan. He played a major role in the Aragonese club achieving promotion to the top flight for the first time in their history, only missing one game in 42.

On his return to the San Mamés Stadium, Remiro seemed set to play in the first team after Kepa moved to Chelsea and the other established goalkeeper Iago Herrerín sustained an injury. However, his representatives failed to agree on the terms of a new contract with the club, and in response his understudy Unai Simón was selected to play in the first match of the new campaign against CD Leganés; with Simón becoming established in the team and no resolution to the contractual dispute, some weeks later it was confirmed that Remiro wished to leave Athletic and would be allowed to do so on 30 June 2019.

=== Real Sociedad ===
Remiro agreed to a four-year deal with Athletic rivals Real Sociedad on 10 June 2019, effective as of 1 July. He made his league debut on 27 September, keeping a clean sheet in a 3–0 home victory over Deportivo Alavés.

In May 2020, Remiro tested positive for COVID-19. The following 3 April, he started in the delayed final of the Copa del Rey, helping to defeat his first club Athletic 1–0 in Seville. On 31 October, he was consoled by former teammates at the end of another Basque derby due to his obvious distress after conceding a late equalising goal with a mistimed attempt to punch the ball clear, when a victory would have put Real Sociedad clear at the top of the table.

Remiro played all 38 league matches in 2022–23 (50 overall), with Real finishing fourth and qualifying for the UEFA Champions League. His maiden appearance in the competition took place on 20 September 2023, in a 1–1 group-stage home draw against Inter Milan.

== International career ==
Remiro represented Spain at under-19 level. He was first called up to the senior team in November 2023, for UEFA Euro 2024 qualifiers against Cyprus and Georgia.

On 15 March 2024, Remiro was picked for friendlies with Colombia and Brazil to be held later that month. He won his first cap seven days later, coming on as a 46th-minute substitute for David Raya in the 1–0 loss to the former in London. He was included in the squad for the Euro finals alongside Simón and Raya, failing to make an appearance for the champions.

== Career statistics ==
=== Club ===
As of match played 1 November 2026

Appearances and goals by club, season and competition
| Club | Season | League | | | Copa del Rey | | Europe | | Other | | Total | |
| Club | Season | Division | Apps | Goals | Apps | Goals | Apps | Goals | Apps | Goals | Apps | Goals |
|---|---|---|---|---|---|---|---|---|---|---|---|---|
| Basconia | 2012–13 | Tercera División | 7 | 0 | — | | — | | — | | 7 | 0 |
| Basconia | 2013–14 | Tercera División | 21 | 0 | — | | — | | — | | 21 | 0 |
| Basconia | Total | | 28 | 0 | — | | — | | — | | 28 | 0 |
| Bilbao Athletic | 2014–15 | Segunda División B | 17 | 0 | — | | — | | 6 (Note: Appearances in Segunda División B play-offs) | 0 | 23 | 0 |
| Bilbao Athletic | 2015–16 | Segunda División | 33 | 0 | — | | — | | — | | 20 | 0 |
| Bilbao Athletic | Total | | 50 | 0 | — | | — | | 6 | 0 | 56 | 0 |
| Athletic Bilbao | 2014–15 | La Liga | 0 | 0 | 0 | 0 | 0 | 0 | — | | 0 | 0 |
| Athletic Bilbao | 2015–16 | La Liga | 0 | 0 | 0 | 0 | 0 | 0 | 0 | 0 | 0 | 0 |
| Athletic Bilbao | 2016–17 | La Liga | 0 | 0 | 0 | 0 | 0 | 0 | — | | 0 | 0 |
| Athletic Bilbao | 2018–19 | La Liga | 0 | 0 | 0 | 0 | — | | — | | 0 | 0 |
| Athletic Bilbao | Total | | 0 | 0 | 0 | 0 | 0 | 0 | — | | 0 | 0 |
| Levante (loan) | 2016–17 | Segunda División | 4 | 0 | 0 | 0 | — | | — | | 4 | 0 |
| Huesca (loan) | 2017–18 | Segunda División | 41 | 0 | 0 | 0 | — | | — | | 41 | 0 |
| Real Sociedad | 2019–20 | La Liga | 25 | 0 | 7 (Note: Includes appearance in 2020 Copa del Rey final (played in 2021)) | 0 | — | | — | | 32 | 0 |
| Real Sociedad | 2020–21 | La Liga | 38 | 0 | 2 | 0 | 7 (Note: Appearances in UEFA Europa League) | 0 | 1 (Note: Appearance in Supercopa de España) | 0 | 48 | 0 |
| Real Sociedad | 2021–22 | La Liga | 35 | 0 | 2 | 0 | 5 | 0 | — | | 42 | 0 |
| Real Sociedad | 2022–23 | La Liga | 38 | 0 | 4 | 0 | 8 | 0 | — | | 50 | 0 |
| Real Sociedad | 2023–24 | La Liga | 37 | 0 | 4 | 0 | 8 (Note: Appearances in UEFA Champions League) | 0 | — | | 49 | 0 |
| Real Sociedad | 2024–25 | La Liga | 36 | 0 | 4 | 0 | 9 | 0 | — | | 49 | 0 |
| Real Sociedad | 2025–26 | La Liga | 37 | 0 | 2 | 0 | — | | — | | 39 | 0 |
| Real Sociedad | 2026–27 | La Liga | 10 | 0 | 0 | 0 | 0 | 0 | 0 | 0 | 10 | 0 |
| Real Sociedad | Total | | 256 | 0 | 25 | 0 | 37 | 0 | 1 | 0 | 319 | 0 |
| Career total | | | 378 | 0 | 25 | 0 | 37 | 0 | 7 | 0 | 447 | 0 |

=== International ===
Appearances and goals by national team and year
| National team | Year | Apps | Goals |
|---|---|---|---|
Spain
| Spain | 2024 | 2 | 0 |
| Total | | 2 | 0 |

== Honours ==
Levante

- Segunda División: 2016–17

Real Sociedad

- Copa del Rey: 2019–20, 2025–26

Spain

- UEFA European Championship: 2024
- UEFA Nations League runner-up: 2024–25
