= Luso (footballer) =

Spanish footballer (born 1984)

Personal information
- Full name: Luis Eduardo Delgado Pacheco
- Date of birth: 4 December 1984 (age 41)
- Place of birth: Zaragoza, Spain
- Height: 1.79 m (5 ft 10 in)
- Position: Defensive midfielder

Youth career
- Ebro
- Zaragoza

Senior career*
Years	Team	Apps	(Gls)
2003–2004	Universidad Zaragoza	18	(0)
2003–2006	Zaragoza B	70	(1)
2006	Figueres	0	(0)
2006–2007	Rapitenca	30	(6)
2007–2010	Sant Andreu	106	(4)
2010–2013	Girona	69	(10)
2013–2017	Córdoba	116	(2)
2017–2018	Huesca	27	(1)
2018–2019	Rayo Majadahonda	30	(2)
2019–2020	Lleida Esportiu	12	(2)
2020–2021	Tudelano	11	(0)
2021–2022	Ejea	21	(0)
2022–2023	La Almunia	22	(3)
2023–2024	Ejea	13	(0)
Total		545	(31)
- * Club domestic league appearances and goals

Luis Eduardo Delgado Pacheco (born 4 December 1984), known as Luso, is a Spanish former professional footballer who played mainly as a defensive midfielder.

He amassed Segunda División totals of 224 games and 14 goals, with Girona, Córdoba, Huesca and Rayo Majadahonda. He added 18 appearances in La Liga with the second of those clubs.

== Club career ==
Born in Zaragoza, Aragon, Luso graduated from Real Zaragoza's youth academy, and made his senior debut with the club's farm team, CD Universidad de Zaragoza. He reached the reserves shortly after, being deployed mostly as a right-back.

Luso went on to compete with Segunda División B and Tercera División sides in the following four seasons, representing UE Figueres, UE Rapitenca and UE Sant Andreu. With the latter, he achieved promotion in 2007–08.

On 23 July 2010, Luso joined Girona FC in the Segunda División. He played his first game as a professional on 28 August, coming on as a late substitute in a 4–2 home win over CD Tenerife. He scored his first goal on 11 December, closing the 1–1 home draw against RC Celta de Vigo.

On 14 July 2013, Luso signed a three-year deal with fellow second-tier Córdoba CF. He was first-choice in his debut campaign, as the club returned to La Liga after a 42-year absence.

Luso's maiden appearance in the Spanish top flight occurred on 28 September 2014, when he started the 0–0 home draw against RCD Espanyol. He scored his only goal in the competition the following 17 May in a 1–2 loss to Rayo Vallecano also at the Estadio Nuevo Arcángel, as his team were already relegated.

On 14 July 2017, Luso signed a two-year contract with SD Huesca in division two after cutting ties with Córdoba. On 23 July of the following year, after achieving promotion to the top tier, he joined CF Rayo Majadahonda of the same league.

Luso returned to the lower leagues subsequently and remained there until his retirement, representing in quick succession Lleida Esportiu, CD Tudelano and SD Ejea.
