= Rulo Prieto =

Spanish footballer

Personal information
- Full name: Raúl Prieto Odena
- Date of birth: 24 October 1995 (age 31)
- Place of birth: Valencia, Spain
- Height: 1.86 m (6 ft 1 in)
- Position: Left back

Team information
- Current team: Calvo Sotelo

Youth career
- Valencia

Senior career*
Years	Team	Apps	(Gls)
2014–2015	Valencia B	1	(0)
2015	→ Ribarroja (loan)	10	(0)
2015–2016	Olímpic Xàtiva	29	(0)
2016–2017	Linense	24	(0)
2017–2018	Huesca	11	(0)
2018–2019	Alcorcón	0	(0)
2018	→ Racing Santander (loan)	7	(0)
2019	→ Levante B (loan)	14	(0)
2019–2020	Hércules	4	(1)
2020–2022	Cornellà	44	(1)
2023–2024	Penya Independent	34	(1)
2025	Peña Deportiva	6	(0)
2025–	Calvo Sotelo	5	(0)
- * Club domestic league appearances and goals as of 26 October 2025

Raúl "Rulo" Prieto Odena (born 24 October 1995), commonly known as just Rulo, is a Spanish footballer who plays as a left back for Tercera Federación club Calvo Sotelo.

== Club career ==
Rulo was born in Valencia, Rulo finished his formation with Valencia CF. He made his senior debut with the reserves on 24 August 2014, coming on as a late substitute for Álex López in a 1–2 Segunda División B away loss against RCD Mallorca B.

After featuring rarely, Rulo was loaned to Tercera División side Ribarroja CF on 27 January 2015, until June. Returning from loan, he moved to CD Olímpic de Xàtiva in the third level on 17 August.

On 11 July 2016, after suffering relegation, Rulo signed for Real Balompédica Linense still in the third division. The following 7 July, he signed a two-year deal with Segunda División side SD Huesca.

Rulo made his professional debut on 6 September 2017, starting in a 0–2 home loss against Real Valladolid, for the season's Copa del Rey. He contributed with eleven league appearances during the campaign, as his side achieved a first-ever promotion to La Liga.

On 16 August 2018, Rulo signed a two-year contract with AD Alcorcón in the second division, and was immediately loaned to Racing de Santander for one year. The following 24 January, after being sparingly used, he moved to fellow third division side Atlético Levante UD, on loan until June; upon returning, he terminated his contract on 16 July 2019.

On 23 January 2020, after six months at Hércules CF, Rulo moved to fellow third division side UE Cornellà.
