= Carlos David =

Spanish footballer

Personal information
- Full name: Carlos David Moreno Hernández
- Date of birth: 14 June 1986 (age 40)
- Place of birth: Mérida, Spain
- Height: 1.84 m (6 ft 0 in)
- Position: Centre back

Youth career
- 1992–2004: Nueva Ciudad Mérida
- 2004–2005: Valencia

Senior career*
Years	Team	Apps	(Gls)
2005–2009	Valencia B	64+	(7+)
2006–2007	→ Puçol (loan)		
2009–2010	Mouscron	13	(2)
2010–2011	Celta B	48	(6)
2011–2012	Teruel	35	(5)
2012–2013	Melilla	34	(4)
2013–2014	Cartagena	34	(7)
2014–2018	Huesca	107	(5)
2018–2019	Union SG	13	(0)
2019–2021	Cartagena	31	(0)
2021–2022	Hércules	25	(2)
2022–2024	Atlético Saguntino	52	(0)
2024–2025	Soneja	30	(1)
- * Club domestic league appearances and goals

Carlos David Moreno Hernández (born 14 June 1986), known as Carlos David, is a Spanish former professional footballer who played as a central defender.

== Football career ==
Born in Mérida, Badajoz, Extremadura, Carlos David graduated from Valencia CF's youth setup. He made his debuts as a senior with the reserves, appearing several seasons in Tercera División and Segunda División B.

On 20 July 2009, Carlos David signed for Belgian Pro League side R.E. Mouscron. He played his first match as a professional on 1 August, starting in a 2–1 away win against K.R.C. Genk. He scored his first professional goals on 5 December, netting a brace in a 2–1 success at K.S.V. Roeselare.

Carlos David left the club in late December 2009 due to its financial troubles, and joined Celta de Vigo's reserve team in the third level the following 15 January. He subsequently resumed his career in the same tier, representing CD Teruel, UD Melilla, FC Cartagena and SD Huesca; with the latter, he notably scored against FC Barcelona in the Copa del Rey, but in a 1–8 away defeat.

On 5 July 2018, after achieving promotion to La Liga, Carlos David terminated his contract with Huesca and signed for Royale Union Saint-Gilloise. Following one year in the Belgian First Division B, he cancelled the two remaining seasons of his contract and returned to Cartagena.

Carlos David helped the Efesé in their promotion to the second division with 20 appearances, but was only a backup option afterwards. On 16 July 2021, he agreed to a one-year deal with Segunda División RFEF side Hércules CF.
