= Borja Lázaro =

Spanish footballer

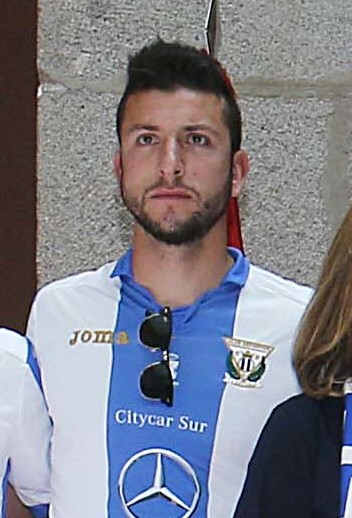
- Lázaro with Leganés in 2016

Personal information
- Full name: Luis Borja Lázaro Fernández
- Date of birth: 5 April 1988 (age 38)
- Place of birth: Madrid, Spain
- Height: 1.89 m (6 ft 2 in)
- Position: Striker

Team information
- Current team: Cayón

Youth career
- Atlético Madrid
- Rangers

Senior career*
Years	Team	Apps	(Gls)
2008–2010	Sporting B	42	(7)
2010–2011	Pontevedra	8	(1)
2011	Puerta Bonita	20	(4)
2011–2012	Noja	31	(21)
2012–2013	Ontinyent	10	(0)
2013–2014	Conquense	30	(8)
2014	Almería B	13	(7)
2014–2016	Leganés	50	(14)
2016–2017	Huesca	36	(7)
2017–2018	Alcorcón	7	(0)
2018	→ Racing Santander (loan)	13	(8)
2018–2019	Fuenlabrada	22	(3)
2020	Algeciras	3	(0)
2020–2021	Pinto	7	(1)
2021–2023	Cayón	40	(11)
2024–	Cayón	9	(5)
- * Club domestic league appearances and goals as of 19:39, 27 November 2024 (UTC)

Luis Borja Lázaro Fernández (born 5 April 1988) is a Spanish footballer who plays as a striker for CD Cayón.

== Football career ==
Born in Madrid, Lázaro finished his graduation with Scottish club Rangers F.C.'s youth setup. He moved to Sporting de Gijón in the 2008 summer, being immediately assigned to the reserves in Segunda División B.

In August 2010 Lázaro joined Pontevedra CF, also in the third level. However, after appearing sparingly for the Galicians he moved to Tercera División's CD Puerta Bonita, and later to SD Noja.

On 21 July 2012 Lázaro moved to Ontinyent CF. He continued to appear in the third and fourth levels in the following years, representing UB Conquense and UD Almería B.

On 1 July 2014 Lázaro joined CD Leganés, newly promoted to Segunda División. He played his first match as a professional on 24 August, replacing Carlos Álvarez in the 74th minute of a 1–1 home draw against Deportivo Alavés.

Lázaro scored his first professional goals on 7 September 2014, netting a hat-trick in a 3–1 home win against RCD Mallorca. He contributed with seven goals in 26 appearances during the 2015–16 campaign, as Lega achieved promotion to La Liga for the first time ever.

On 16 June 2016, Lázaro signed a three-year deal with SD Huesca also in the second tier. On 6 July of the following year, he agreed to a two-year contract with fellow league team AD Alcorcón.

On 19 January 2018, Lázaro was loaned to Racing de Santander until June. Upon returning, he terminated his contract on 12 July, and signed for CF Fuenlabrada on 1 August.

Lázro contributed with four goals during the season, helping Fuenla in their first-ever promotion to the second division. On 18 December 2019, he cut ties with the club, and signed for Algeciras CF in division three the following 29 January.
