= 2009–10 Real Sociedad season =

Real Sociedad
2009–10 season
- President: Jokin Aperribay
- Head coach: Martín Lasarte
- Stadium: Anoeta
- Segunda División: 1st (promoted)
- Copa del Rey: Round of 32
- Top goalscorer: League: Carlos Bueno (12); All: Carlos Bueno (12)

The 2009–10 season is Real Sociedad's last season to date in the second division. After three seasons in the second division the club obtained promotion on the 41st match day.

== Season summary ==
The season began with the appointment of Martín Lasarte as new coach. The Uruguayan, with no experience in European football, was chosen by Jokin Aperribay as a replacement for Juan Manuel Lillo. The preceding season under Lillo was one of the worst in the club's history, as the club never challenged for promotion.

During the transfer window, the club hired several players on loan, who would prove to be key to the club's promotion. By September, the club had reached promotion spots, a place they would not leave for the rest of the season. The winter break was preceded by a home win against Real Betis. Real Sociedad topped the table with 35 points by Christmas, two points above second-placed Hércules. After losing on the 21st matchday, Real Sociedad temporarily lost their first place.

Towards the end of the season, Real Betis began challenging for promotion and beat Real Sociedad in Seville. In late May, they joined Levante, Hércules and Real Sociedad in a tight promotion race. However, the Andalusians would fall short and fail to obtain promotion. Real Sociedad bounced back after their defeat against Betis and won three games in a row. A home win against Celta de Vigo, the last of those three, sealed promotion.

In the Copa del Rey, Real Sociedad were knocked out in the first round by Rayo Vallecano, who disposed of the Guipuscoan club with ease.

== Squad information ==
Note: Flags indicate national team as defined under FIFA eligibility rules; some limited exceptions apply. Players may hold more than one non-FIFA nationality.

No.	Pos.	Nation	Player
1	GK	CHI	Claudio Bravo
2	DF	ESP	Carlos Martínez
3	DF	ESP	Mikel González
4	MF	ESP	Gorka Elustondo
5	MF	ESP	Markel Bergara
6	DF	ESP	Mikel Labaka
7	MF	CMR	Franck Songo'o
8	FW	EQG	Emilio Nsue
9	FW	ESP	Imanol Agirretxe
10	MF	ESP	Xabi Prieto
11	MF	ESP	Mikel Aranburu
13	GK	ESP	Eñaut Zubikarai
14	DF	ESP	Iosu Esnaola

No.	Pos.	Nation	Player
15	DF	ESP	Ion Ansotegi
16	DF	ESP	Iñigo Sarasola
17	MF	FRA	David Zurutuza
18	FW	ESP	Borja Viguera
19	MF	ESP	Diego Rivas
20	FW	URU	Carlos Bueno
21	FW	COL	Jonathan Estrada
22	DF	ESP	Dani Estrada
23	MF	ESP	Sergio Rodríguez
24	DF	ESP	Alberto de la Bella
25	GK	ESP	Asier Riesgo
27	MF	FRA	Antoine Griezmann

== League ==
Pos	Team	Pld	W	D	L	GF	GA	GD	Pts	Promotion or relegation
1	Real Sociedad (C, P)	42	20	14	8	53	37	+16	74	Promotion to La Liga
2	Hércules (P)	42	19	14	9	61	34	+27	71 (Note: HÉR: 7 pts; LEV: 6 pts; BET: 4 pts)	Promotion to La Liga
3	Levante (P)	42	19	14	9	63	45	+18	71	Promotion to La Liga
4	Betis	42	19	14	9	61	38	+23	71	
5	Cartagena	42	18	11	13	58	49	+9	65	

Source: LFP – Liga Adelante
Rules for classification: 1st points; 2nd head-to-head points; 3rd head-to-head goal difference; 4th head-to-head goals scored; 5th goal difference; 6th number of goals scored; 7th Fair-play points
(C) Champions; (P) Promoted
Notes:

29 August 2009 1	Las Palmas	1–1	Real Sociedad	Las Palmas
	Cejudo 44'; García (yellow card); González (yellow card) (yellow-red card)	(Report)	27' Agirretxe; (yellow card) Bravo; (yellow card) Prieto; (yellow card) Rivas; (yellow card) Estrada; (yellow card) Bergara	Stadium: Estadio de Gran Canaria; Referee: Lesma López

6 September 2009 2	Real Sociedad	0–0	Real Murcia	San Sebastián
	De la Bella (yellow card); Agirretxe (yellow card)	(Report)		Stadium: Anoeta; Referee: Lizondo Cortés

12 September 2009 3	Gimnàstic de Tarragona	1–2	Real Sociedad	Tarragona
	Roberto 66'; Morán (yellow card); José Mari (yellow card); Fachan (yellow card)	(Report)	61' Agirretxe; 89', (yellow card) Buena; (yellow card) De la Bella	Stadium: Nou Estadi de Tarragona; Referee: Hevia Obras

20 September 2009 4	Real Sociedad	2–2	Girona	San Sebastián
	Agirretxe 53', 80'; Rivas (yellow card); Estrada (yellow card); Aranburu (yellow card)	(Report)	20' Ratón; 73', (yellow card) Peragón; (yellow card) Bernaus; (yellow card) Tortolero; (yellow card) Galán; (yellow card) Matamala	Stadium: Anoeta; Referee: Ceballos Silva

27 September 2009 5	Real Sociedad	2–0	Huesca	San Sebastián
	Griezmann 39'; Bueno 89'; Ansotegi (yellow card); Sarasola (yellow card); Estrada (yellow card)	(Report)	(yellow card) Rico	Stadium: Anoeta; Referee: Trujillo Suárez

4 October 2009 6	Numancia	1–3	Real Sociedad	Soria
	Goiria 51'; Jaio (yellow card); Nagore (yellow card); Álvaro (yellow card)	(Report)	7' Zurutuza; 26', 52', (yellow card) Prieto; (yellow card) Elustondo; (yellow card) Aranburu; (yellow card) Estrada	Stadium: Nuevo Los Pajaritos; Referee: Miranda Torres

11 October 2009 7	Real Sociedad	2–0	Salamanca	San Sebastián
	Griezmann 53'; Ansotegi 56'; González (yellow card); Labaka (yellow card); Rivas (yellow card)	(Report)	(yellow card) Gañán; (yellow card) Jurado; (red card) 89' Despotović	Stadium: Anoeta; Referee: Teixeira Vitienes

18 October 2009 8	Levante	1–0	Real Sociedad	Valencia
		(Report)	(yellow card) González; (yellow card) Labaka; (yellow card) Ansotegi; (yellow card) Zurutuza; (yellow card) De la Bella; (yellow card) Nsue	Stadium: Ciudad de Valencia; Referee: Amoedo Chas

24 October 2009 9	Real Sociedad	1–0	Córdoba	San Sebastián
	Nsue 48'; Aranburu (yellow card); Zurutuza (yellow card); Estrada (yellow card); Griezmann (yellow card); Bergara (yellow card)	(Report)	(yellow card) Vega; (yellow card) Díaz; (yellow card) Juanjo	Stadium: Anoeta; Referee: Piñeiro Crespo

1 November 2009 10	Hércules	5–1	Real Sociedad	Alicante
		(Report)	80' Griezmann; (yellow card) González; Rodríguez	Stadium: José Rico Pérez; Referee: Mariscal Sánchez

7 November 2009 11	Real Sociedad	1–0	Recreativo Huelva	San Sebastián
	Griezmann 75'; González (yellow card)	(Report)	(yellow card) Peña; (yellow card) Fuego; (yellow card) Colunga; (yellow card) Vázquez	Stadium: Anoeta; Referee: Lesma López

14 November 2009 12	Albacete	0–0	Real Sociedad	Albacete
	Ortiz (yellow card); López (yellow card); Isma (yellow card)	(Report)	(yellow card) Aranburu; (yellow card) De la Bella	Stadium: Carlos Belmonte; Referee: Lizondo Cortés

22 November 2009 13	Real Sociedad	1–0	Cartagena	San Sebastián
	Agirretxe 88'; Ansotegi (yellow card); Bueno (yellow card)	(Report)	(yellow card) (yellow-red card) Cygan; (yellow card) Expósito; (yellow card) Sánchez	Stadium: Anoeta; Referee: Hernández Hernández

29 November 2009 14	Rayo Vallecano	3–3	Real Sociedad	Vallecas
	Susaeta 6'; García 18', (yellow card); Salva (yellow card) (yellow-red card)	(Report)	16' Prieto; 29', (yellow card) Bueno; 64' Zurutuza; (yellow card) Rivas; (yellow card) González	Stadium: Teresa Rivero; Referee: Pérez Montero

5 December 2009 15	Real Sociedad	4–1	Real Unión	San Sebastián
	Bueno 8'; Ansotegi 32', 40'; Nsue 73'; Mikel Labaka (yellow card); Prieto (yellow card); Griezmann (yellow card)	(Report)	45', (yellow card) Domínguez; (yellow card) Gurrutxaga; (yellow card) Larraínzar; (yellow card) (yellow-red card) Alcalá; (yellow card) Beobide	Stadium: Anoeta; Referee: Melero López

12 December 2009 16	Castellón	0–1	Real Sociedad	Castellón
	Rafita (yellow card); Mantecón (yellow card); Uranga (yellow card)	(Report)	19' Labaka; (yellow card) González; (yellow card) Elustondo; (yellow card) Estrada; (yellow card) Bueno	Stadium: Nou Estadi Castalia; Referee: Pino Zamorano

20 December 2009 17	Real Sociedad	2–0	Real Betis	San Sebastián
	Bueno 29', (yellow card) 29'; Prieto 85', (yellow card); Rivas (yellow card)	(Report)	(yellow card) Emana; (yellow card) García; (yellow card) Rodri	Stadium: Anoeta; Referee: Hevia Obras

3 January 2010 18	Villarreal B	1–1	Real Sociedad	Villarreal
	Ruben 77'; Musacchio (yellow card) (yellow-red card); Matilla (yellow card); Pérez (yellow card)	(Report)	75', (yellow card) Zurutuza; Prieto; (yellow card) (yellow-red card) Estrada	Stadium: Ciudad Deportiva; Referee: Ceballos Silva

9 January 2010 19	Real Sociedad	4–1	Cádiz	San Sebastián
	Aranburu 11', (yellow card); Agirretxe 46'; Elustondo 76'; Griezmann 90'; Rivas (yellow card)	(Report)	6' Tristán; (yellow card) Mansilla; (yellow card) Cristian; (yellow card) Enrique	Stadium: Anoeta; Referee: Ontanaya López

16 January 2010 20	Celta Vigo	0–1	Real Sociedad	Vigo
	Mallo (yellow card); Figueras (yellow card); López Garai (yellow card); Aspas (yellow card) (yellow-red card); Joselu (yellow card)	(Report)	58' Nsue; (yellow card) Labaka; (yellow card) Ansotegi	Stadium: Balaídos; Referee: Bernabé García

24 January 2010 21	Real Sociedad	0–1	Elche	San Sebastián
	Bravo (red card) 9'; Aranburu (yellow card); Rivas (yellow card); Zurutuza (yellow card)	(Report)	11' (pen.) Molina; (yellow card) (yellow-red card) Juli; (yellow card) Crespí; (yellow card) Rubio; (yellow card) Esteban; (yellow card) Gómez	Stadium: Anoeta; Referee: Gil Manzano

30 January 2010 22	Real Sociedad	2–2	Las Palmas	San Sebastián
	Bueno 49'; Aranburu (yellow card)	(Report)	65' Rondón; 68' Darino; 89' (o.g.) Juanpa; (yellow card) Pindado; (yellow card) León; (yellow card) Suárez	Stadium: Anoeta; Referee: Jaime Latre

6 February 2010 23	Real Murcia	1–1	Real Sociedad	Murcia
	Mejia (yellow card); Bea (yellow card)	(Report)	50' Bueno; 58' (o.g.) Labaka; (yellow card) Elustondo; (yellow card) Aranburu	Stadium: Nueva Condomina; Referee: Del Cerro Grande

14 February 2010 24	Real Sociedad	1–0	Gimnàstic de Tarragona	San Sebastián
	Bravo 44'; Labaka (yellow card); Songo'o (yellow card)	(Report)	(yellow card) García; (yellow card) Fachan; (yellow card) (yellow-red card) Medina; (yellow card) (yellow-red card) Miguel Ángel	Stadium: Anoeta; Referee: Amoedo Chas

21 February 2010 25	Girona	1–0	Real Sociedad	Girona
	Calle (pen.); Matamala (yellow card)	(Report)	(yellow card) Ansotegi; (yellow card) Nsue	Stadium: Municipal de Montilivi; Referee: Lesma López

27 February 2010 26	Huesca	1–1	Real Sociedad	Huesca
	Moises 58'; Dorado (yellow card); Juanma (yellow card); Camacho (yellow card); Gomes (yellow card); Rico (yellow card)	(Report)	80' Labaka; (yellow card) Songo'o	Stadium: El Alcoraz; Referee: Ontanaya López

7 March 2010 27	Real Sociedad	2–1	Numancia	San Sebastián
	Griezmann 29', (yellow card); De la Bella 56'; Rivas (yellow card)	(Report)	39' Goiria; (yellow card) Nagore	Stadium: Anoeta; Referee: Miranda Torres

14 March 2010 28	Salamanca	0–0	Real Sociedad	Villares de la Reina
	Ribas (yellow card); Jurado (yellow card)	(Report)	(yellow card) Labaka	Stadium: El Helmántico; Referee: Melero López

21 March 2010 29	Real Sociedad	3–1	Levante	San Sebastián
	Bueno 30'; Ansotegi 89'; Zurutuza 90'; Rivas (yellow card)	(Report)	72', (yellow card) Juanlu; (yellow card) (yellow-red card) Ballesteros; (yellow card) Pallardó; (yellow card) Iborra; (yellow card) Samuel	Stadium: Anoeta; Referee: Pino Zamorano

27 March 2010 30	Córdoba	2–0	Real Sociedad	Córdoba
		(Report)	(yellow card) (yellow-red card) Prieto; (yellow card) Bueno	Stadium: Nuevo Arcángel; Referee: Trujillo Suárez

4 April 2010 31	Real Sociedad	1–0	Hércules	San Sebastián
	Nsue 33'; Elustondo (yellow card); Songo'o (yellow card); Estrada (yellow card)	(Report)	(yellow card) Rodri; (yellow card) Farinos; (yellow card) Tote	Stadium: Anoeta; Referee: Ontanaya López

12 April 2010 32	Recreativo Huelva	2–0	Real Sociedad	Huelva
	Braulio 65'; Vázquez 90' (pen.); Guaita (yellow card); Peña (yellow card); Cámara (yellow card)	(Report)	(red card) 90' Zubikarai	Stadium: Nuevo Colombino; Referee: Iglesias Villanueva

17 April 2010 33	Real Sociedad	0–0	Albacete	San Sebastián
	Prieto (yellow card); Aranburu (yellow card)	(Report)	(yellow card) López Ramos; (yellow card) Verza; (yellow card) Stuani; (yellow card) Altobelli; (yellow card) Núñez	Stadium: Anoeta; Referee: Pérez Montero

25 April 2010 34	Cartagena	1–1	Real Sociedad	Cartagena
	Herrero 17'; Signorino (yellow card); Etxeita (yellow card); Expósito (yellow card); Sánchez (yellow card)	(Report)	, (yellow card) (yellow-red card) Aranburu; (yellow card) Martínez; (yellow card) Rivas	Stadium: Cartagonova; Referee: Teixeira Vitienes

1 May 2010 35	Real Sociedad	1–0	Rayo Vallecano	San Sebastián
	Prieto 30'	(Report)	(yellow card) Coke; (yellow card) Susaeta	Stadium: Anoeta; Referee: Melero López

8 May 2010 36	Real Unión	0–0	Real Sociedad	Irun
	Descarga (yellow card); Robles (yellow card); Durán (yellow card); Beobide (yellow card)	(Report)	(yellow card) Martínez; (yellow card) Rivas; (yellow card) Viguera	Stadium: Stadium Gal; Referee: Pino Zamorano

14 May 2010 37	Real Sociedad	0–0	Castellón	San Sebastián
	Prieto (yellow card); Griezmann (yellow card)	(Report)	(yellow card) Baigorri; (yellow card) (yellow-red card) Mantecón; (yellow card) (yellow-red card) Rafita; (yellow card) (yellow-red card) Pendín	Stadium: Anoeta; Referee: Piñeiro Crespo

23 May 2010 38	Real Betis	1–0	Real Sociedad	Seville
	Emaná (pen.); Vega (yellow card); García (yellow card); Aurélio (yellow card)	(Report)	(yellow card) (yellow-red card) Martínez; (yellow card) (yellow-red card) González; (yellow card) Ansotegi; (yellow card) Rivas	Stadium: Manuel Ruiz de Lopera; Referee: Lizondo Cortés

29 May 2010 39	Real Sociedad	2–1	Villarreal B	San Sebastián
	Prieto 17' (pen.); González 57', (yellow card); Aranburu (yellow card); Rivas (yellow card); Bueno (yellow card)	(Report)	33' (pen.) Ruben; (yellow card) Musacchio; (yellow card) Cristóbal; (yellow card) Montero	Stadium: Anoeta; Referee: Del Cerro Grande

5 June 2010 40	Cádiz	1–3	Real Sociedad	Cádiz
	Ogbeche 88'; López (yellow card); Cristian (yellow card); Costa (yellow card)	(Report)	12', 50', 60', (yellow card) 12' Bueno; (yellow card) Aranburu; (yellow card) Rivas	Stadium: Ramón de Carranza Stadium; Referee: Lesma López

13 June 2010 41	Real Sociedad	2–0	Celta Vigo	San Sebastián
	Prieto 52' (pen.); Bueno 63', (yellow card); Griezmann (yellow card)	(Report)	(yellow card) Papadopoulos; (yellow card) Tuñez	Stadium: Anoeta; Referee: Teixeira Vitienes

19 June 2010 42	Elche	4–1	Real Sociedad	Elche
	Molina 39', 48', 62', 88'	(Report)	60' Nsue; (yellow card) Rodríguez	Stadium: Manuel Martínez Valero; Referee: Melero López
