= 2010–11 Real Sociedad season =

Real Sociedad
2010–11 season
- President: Jokin Aperribay
- Head coach: Martín Lasarte
- Stadium: Anoeta
- La Liga: 15th
- Copa del Rey: Round of 32
- Top goalscorer: League: Antoine Griezmann (7); All: Antoine Griezmann (7)
Home colours	Away colours

The 2010–11 season was Real Sociedad's 65th season in La Liga. After spending 3 seasons in the second tier of Spanish football the Basque club obtained promotion by topping the table in 2010.

This article shows player statistics and all matches (official and friendly) that the club played during the 2010–11 season.

== Season summary ==
In the 2010–11 season, Real Sociedad played in the top division of Spanish football for the first time since being relegated in 2007. Some additions were made to the squad that had obtained promotion. Among them Joseba Llorente stood out, having cost €2.5 million.

The season started with a home victory against Villarreal. During the first half of the season, the club got an unexpectedly high point tally. Relegation looked extremely unlikely and optimism reigned. Later in the season, the shortcomings in Lasarte's approach became clear and the club was in free fall. On the last match day Real Sociedad avoided relegation and Deportivo de La Coruña were relegated instead.

At the end of the season, Lasarte was dismissed on the grounds that he did not give enough of a chance to academy players and that his style of play was rudimentary and unattractive.

== Players ==
=== Squad information ===
Note: Flags indicate national team as defined under FIFA eligibility rules; some limited exceptions apply. Players may hold more than one non-FIFA nationality.

No.	Pos.	Nation	Player
1	GK	CHI	Claudio Bravo
2	DF	ESP	Carlos Martínez
3	DF	ESP	Mikel González
4	MF	ESP	Gorka Elustondo
5	MF	ESP	Markel Bergara
6	DF	ESP	Mikel Labaka
7	MF	FRA	Antoine Griezmann
8	FW	ESP	Joseba Llorente
9	FW	ESP	Imanol Agirretxe
10	MF	ESP	Xabi Prieto
11	MF	ESP	Mikel Aranburu (captain)
13	GK	ESP	Eñaut Zubikarai
14	MF	NED	Jeffrey Sarpong

No.	Pos.	Nation	Player
15	DF	ESP	Ion Ansotegi
16	DF	NOR	Vadim Demidov
17	MF	FRA	David Zurutuza
18	FW	ESP	Borja Viguera
19	MF	ESP	Diego Rivas
20	FW	ESP	Raúl Tamudo
21	FW	URU	Diego Ifrán
22	DF	ESP	Dani Estrada
23	MF	ESP	Francisco Sutil
24	DF	ESP	Alberto de la Bella
26	MF	ESP	Asier Illarramendi
30	GK	ESP	Toño

== Start formations ==
Starting XI

Lineup that started most of the club's competitive matches throughout the season.

No.	Pos.	Nat.	Name	MS	Notes
1	GK	(Chile)	Claudio Bravo	38	
2	RB	(Spain)	Carlos Martínez	25	
15	CB	(Spain)	Ion Ansotegi	32	
3	CB	(Spain)	Mikel González	30	
24	LB	(Spain)	Alberto de la Bella	28	
19	MF	(Spain)	Diego Rivas	31	
11	MF	(Spain)	Mikel Aranburu	27	
10	AM	(Spain)	Xabi Prieto	37	
17	AM	(France)	David Zurutuza	30	
7	AM	(France)	Antoine Griezmann	34	
20	FW	(Spain)	Raúl Tamudo	20	

4–2–3–1 was the default formation during that season. Occasionally, Lasarte changed formation, resorting to a back 5 (Santander away) or in some cases adding a second forward (Levante away). In some other games (Atlético Madrid Away) Lasarte played three center-midfielders. The preferred partnership in center midfield was that of Aranburu and Rivas. Alternative choices, such as Bergara or Elustondo, proving to be unsuccessful. Up front, Llorente began strongly but after his injury he was replaced by Tamudo, who would eventually start more games and play more minutes.

== Player statistics ==
Squad stats
Nr.	Player	Games played	Starting	Sub	Subbed	Mins played	Goals	Pens. against	Pens. for	Fouls suff.	Fouls comm.	Yellow C	Red c	Assists	Passes	Good passes
10	Prieto	37	36	1	3	3388	7	0	0	116	26	6	0	81	1872	1307
17	Zurutuza	36	30	6	20	2595	2	2	0	97	60	6	0	27	1373	972
27	Griezmann	37	34	3	19	2952	7	0	0	43	45	7	0	51	1276	750
11	Aranburu	32	27	5	11	2422	5	0	0	37	35	6	0	16	1020	782
20	Tamudo	31	20	11	13	1904	7	0	0	43	24	5	0	9	381	258
15	Ansotegi	32	32	0	1	2947	1	0	0	9	21	3	0	2	806	612
19	Rivas	32	31	1	10	2683	2	0	0	60	90	9	0	5	1163	916
3	Mikel	32	30	2	3	2795	0	0	1	8	34	5	0	4	878	638
24	De la Bella	30	28	2	2	2651	0	0	1	31	42	4	0	15	1458	1001
2	Martínez	25	25	0	1	2312	0	0	0	35	22	1	0	16	1196	791
5	Bergara	19	9	10	2	1016	0	0	0	11	19	5	0	6	468	379
8	Llorente	18	15	3	9	1320	5	0	0	13	31	4	0	14	328	241
4	Elustondo	18	13	5	4	1237	0	0	0	11	14	3	0	6	579	417
14	Sarpong	16	1	15	1	379	1	0	0	10	8	1	0	6	166	111
22	Estrada	19	18	1	0	1704	1	0	0	12	22	4	0	13	834	561
6	Labaka	14	9	5	1	973	0	0	0	4	13	3	0	2	258	201
23	Sutil	17	4	13	4	553	2	0	0	12	9	1	0	9	223	109
16	Demidov	13	12	1	0	1148	0	0	0	4	6	2	0	3	395	303
9	Agirretxe	11	1	10	0	232	3	0	0	2	3	0	0	0	53	34
21	Ifrán	10	3	7	3	350	2	0	0	7	6	2	0	1	59	41
18	Viguera	5	0	5	0	84	0	0	0	0	2	0	0	1	29	18
26	Illarramendi	3	2	1	0	199	0	0	0	0	5	2	0	2	139	111

== Summer transfers ==
Emilio Nsue and Carlos Bueno, who were instrumental to the club's promotion, returned to their original clubs, as did the less important Songo'o and Jonathan Estrada.

In the winter transfer window Agirretxe was close to being loaned to a second division club. However, a season-ending injury suffered by Joseba Llorente put an end to all speculation. Borja Viguera was loaned to Catalan second division club Gimnàstic due to lack of opportunities. After having played a handful of games, his season ended when he suffered an injury.

The club acquired some new players in order to reinforce its squad. Most of the signings were arguably failures. Jeffrey Sarpong was bought from Ajax for €200,000 and was mostly used as a substitute. Francisco Sutil, a free transfer, suffered a similar fate. Joseba Llorente, signed from Villarreal for €2.5 million, although impressive while fit, missed most of the season due to injury. Raúl Tamudo and Vadim Demidov were the most consistent signings that season. Finally, Diego Ifrán showed signs of his quality, despite coming back from injury much later than expected.

=== In ===
Player	From	Fee
(Spain) Joseba Llorente	(Spain) Villarreal	€2,500,000
(Spain) Raúl Tamudo	(Spain) Espanyol	Free
(Uruguay) Diego Ifrán	(Uruguay) Danubio	€1,600,000
(Spain) Francisco Sutil	(Spain) Eibar	Free
(Netherlands) Jeffrey Sarpong	(Netherlands) Ajax	€200,000
(Norway) Vadim Demidov	(Norway) Rosenborg	Free player, winter signing.

=== Out ===
Player	New Team	Fee
(Spain) Asier Riesgo	(Spain) Osasuna	Free, end of contract
(Spain) Sergio Rodríguez	(Spain) Logroñés	Free, end of contract

=== Loan out ===
Player	Team
(Spain) Iosu Esnaola	(Spain) Real Unión
(Spain) Iñigo Sarasola	(Spain) Real Unión
(Spain) Borja Viguera	(Spain) Gimnàstic
(Spain) Alex Albistegi	(Spain) Eibar

=== Loan return ===
Italics for players returning to the club but left it during pre-season

Player	From
(Spain) Toño	(Spain) Tenerife B

=== Loan end ===
Player	To
(Colombia) Jonathan Estrada	(Colombia) Millonarios
(Uruguay) Carlos Bueno	Universidad de Chile
(Equatorial Guinea) Emilio Nsue	(Spain) Mallorca
(Cameroon) Franck Songo'o	(Spain) Zaragoza

== Club ==
=== Coaching staff ===
Position	Staff
Head coach	(Uruguay) Martín Lasarte
Assistant Coach	(Spain) Alberto Iturralde
Fitness Trainer	(Uruguay) Pablo Balbi
Goalkeeper Coach	(Spain) Roberto Navajas
Technical Assistant	(Spain) Karla Larburu

== Pre-season ==
The club played a series of friendlies preparing for the new season. A brief stage in Austria allowed the club to play some foreign clubs.

Date	Rival	Place	Result	Scorers
30 July	Elgoibar	Mintxeta, Elgoibar	0–3	Llorente 18', Sutil 23', Agirretxe 58'
4 August	Dinamo Tirana	Bad Bleiber, Austria	4 – 2	Llorente 6', Agirretxe (2) 82', 85' Viguera 88'
6 August	AEL Limassol	Bad Bleiber, Austria	3 – 0	Viguera 55', Aranburu 63', Llorente 89'
7 August	VfL Bochum	Bad Bleiber, Austria	1 – 1	Prieto 55'
12 August	Eibar	Ipurua, Eibar	1 – 3	Aranburu 52', Agirretxe 78', Alex Albistegi 78'
14 August	Sporting de Gijón	Asti, Zarautz	0 – 1
18 August	Real Unión	Txerloia, Azkoitia	1–1	Agirretxe 46'
22 August	Osasuna	Estadio Reyno de Navarra, Pamplona	0 – 1	Tamudo 78'

== Liga BBVA ==
Win Draw Loss Postponed

29 August 2010 1	Real Sociedad	1 – 0	Villarreal	San Sebastián
17:00 CET	Prieto 57'; Zurutuza (yellow card) 62'; Llorente (yellow card) 68'; Rivas (yellow card) 74'	(Report)	(yellow card) 21' Cazorla; (yellow card) 82' Marchena; (yellow card) 90' Capdevila	Stadium: Anoeta; Attendance: 24,865; Referee: José Luis González

13 September 2010 2	Almería	2 – 2	Real Sociedad	Almería
21:00 CET	Piatti 21'; Ulloa 90'; Vargas (yellow card) 32'; Ortiz (yellow card) 73'; Acasiete (yellow card) 83'; Corona (yellow card) 90'	(Report)	8' Tamudo; 33' Sutil; (yellow card) 23' Rivas; (yellow card) 26' Mikel	Stadium: Estadio de los Juegos Mediterráneos; Attendance: 13,000; Referee: Alejandrdo Villanueva

18 September 2010 3	Real Sociedad	1 – 2	Real Madrid	San Sebastián
22:00 CET	Tamudo 62'; González (yellow card) 86'	(Report)	62' Di María; (yellow card) 25', (goal) 74' Pepe; (yellow card) 50' Ramos	Stadium: Anoeta; Attendance: 30,114; Referee: Antonio Mateu Lahoz

21 September 2010 4	Osasuna	3 – 1	Real Sociedad	Pamplona
20:00 CET	Pandiani 38', (yellow card) 81'; Camuñas 42'; Aranda 75'; Juanfran (yellow card) 59'; Soriano (yellow card) 69'	(Report)	16' Tamudo; (yellow card) 20' Bergara	Stadium: Reyno de Navarra; Attendance: 18,715; Referee: Carlos Velasco Carballo

26 September 2010 5	Mallorca	2 – 0	Real Sociedad	Mallorca
17:00 CET	Cavenaghi 7', 62'; Rubén (yellow card) 40'; Ramis (yellow card) 56'	(Report)	(yellow card) 34' Griezmann; (yellow card) 73' Zurutuza	Stadium: Son Moix; Attendance: 14,000; Referee: Antonio Rubinos Pérez

2 October 2010 6	Real Sociedad	1 – 0	Espanyol	San Sebastián
20:00 CET	Forlín 85' (o.g.); Griezmann (yellow card) 76'	(Report)	(yellow card) 8' Ruiz; (yellow card) 37' L. García; (yellow card) 52' D. García; (yellow card) 90' Chica	Stadium: Anoeta; Attendance: 24,000; Referee: Javier Turienzo Álvarez

17 October 2010 7	Levante	2 – 1	Real Sociedad	Valencia
17:00 CET	Del Horno (yellow card) 2', (goal) 60'; Nano (yellow card) 20'; Caicedo 63'; Juanlu (yellow card) 90'	(Report)	79' Sarpong; (yellow card) 31' Ansotegi; (yellow card) 43' Griezmann; (yellow card) 67' Aranburu	Stadium: Ciutat de València; Attendance: 10,000; Referee: Fernando Teixeira Vitienes

25 October 2010 8	Real Sociedad	3 – 0	Deportivo de La Coruña	San Sebastián
20:00 CET	Llorente 17'; Griezmann 70'; Agirretxe 86'; Aranburu (yellow card) 50'; Griezmann (yellow card) 72'	(Report)	(yellow card) 21' Desmarets; (yellow card) 64' Pérez	Stadium: Anoeta; Attendance: 21,836; Referee: José Luis Paradas Romero

31 October 2010 9	Málaga	1 –2	Real Sociedad	Málaga
17:00 CET	Edinho (yellow card) 59'; Juanmi 77'	(Report)	(yellow card) 21' De la Bella; (yellow card) 39' Zurutuza; 43' Griezmann; (yellow card) 51', (goal) 55' Llorente; (yellow card) 88' Prieto	Stadium: Estadio La Rosaleda; Attendance: 18,000; Referee: José Luis González

6 November 2010 10	Real Sociedad	1 –0	Racing de Santander	San Sebastián
20:00 CET	Llorente 7'; Rivas (yellow card) 77'	(Report)	(yellow card) 13' Kennedy; (yellow card) 26' Diop; (yellow card) 54' Francis; (yellow card) 54' Colsa; (yellow card) 83' Cisma; (yellow card) 90' Torrejón	Stadium: Anoeta; Attendance: 23,000; Referee: José Luis González

14 November 2010 11	Hércules	2 – 1	Real Sociedad	Alicante
17:00 CET	Trezeguet 47'; Drenthe 52'; Valdez (yellow card) 3'	(Report)	16' Griezmann; (yellow card) 38' Elustondo; (yellow card) 51' González	Stadium: Estadio José Rico Pérez; Attendance: 18,000; Referee: Alberto Undiano Mallenco

21 November 2010 12	Real Sociedad	2 – 4	Atlético Madrid	San Sebastián
21:00 CET	Llorente 11'; Rivas 85'; Aranburu (yellow card) 55'; Ansotegi (yellow card) 73'; Bergara (yellow card) 73'	(Report)	(yellow card) 12' Ujfaluši; (yellow card) 68' Suárez; 71' Forlán; 79', 82' Agüero; 90' (pen.) Simão	Stadium: Anoeta; Attendance: 23,850; Referee: Ayza Gámez

28 October 2010 13	Sporting de Gijón	1 –3	Real Sociedad	Gijón
17:00 CET	Grégory 3'; Botía (yellow card) 17'; De las Cuevas (yellow card) 34'; Sangoy (yellow card) 52'; Barral (yellow card) 59'; Carmelo (yellow card) 64'; Lora (yellow card) 66'	(Report)	11' Prieto; (yellow card) 33' De la Bella; 45', (yellow card) 73' Zurutuza; (yellow card) 64' Llorente; 90' Aranburu	Stadium: El Molinón; Referee: Paradas Romero

5 December 2010 14	Real Sociedad	2 – 0	Athletic Bilbao	San Sebastián
21:00 CET	Prieto (yellow card) 25', (goal) 26'; Rivas (yellow card) 29'; San José 48' (o.g.)	(Report)	(yellow card) 90' Gurpegui	Stadium: Anoeta; Referee: Ramírez Domínguez

12 December 2010 15	Barcelona	5 – 0	Real Sociedad	Barcelona
21:00 CET	Mascherano (yellow card) 7'; Villa 9'; Iniesta 33'; Messi 47', 87'; Bojan 90'	(Report)		Stadium: Nou Camp; Referee: David Fernández Borbalán

18 December 2010 16	Real Sociedad	1 – 2	Valencia	San Sebastián
22:00 CET	Rivas (yellow card) 7'; Prieto 23' (pen.), (yellow card) 54'; De la Bella (yellow card) 58'	(Report)	(yellow card) 21' Navarro; (yellow card) 29' Soldado; 45', (yellow card) 86' T. Costa; (yellow card) 81' Bruno; 90' Aduriz	Stadium: Anoeta; Attendance: 21,885; Referee: Iglesias Villanueva

3 January 2011 17	Real Zaragoza	2 – 1	Real Sociedad	Zaragoza
20:00 CET	Sinama Pongolle 10'; Paredes (yellow card) 42'; Ponzio (yellow card) 52'; Gabi (yellow card) 67'; Braulio 90'	(Report)	Prieto 33'; Griezmann (yellow card) 78'	Stadium: La Romareda; Attendance: 20,000; Referee: Teixeira Vitienes

8 January 2011 18	Real Sociedad	2 – 3	Sevilla	San Sebastián
20:00 CET	Rivas 23'; Llorente 43'; Rivas (yellow card) 46'; González (yellow card) 57'	(Report)	25' Kanouté; 63', 65' Fabiano; (yellow card) 70' Navarro; (yellow card) 90' Varas	Stadium: Anoeta; Attendance: 24,000; Referee: Javier Estrada Fernández

15 January 2011 19	Getafe	0 –4	Real Sociedad	Getafe
18:00 CET	Díaz (yellow card) 28'; Boateng (yellow card) 48'; Rafa (yellow card) 82'	(Report)	10' Prieto; 32' Griezmann; (yellow card) 35' Rivas; (yellow card) 41' Zurutuza; (yellow card) 58' Bergara; (yellow card) 68' Llorente; (yellow card) 73' Elustondo; 87', 90' Aranburu	Stadium: Coliseum Alfonso Pérez; Attendance: 9,500; Referee: Javier Turienzo Álvarez

23 January 2011 20	Villarreal	2 – 1	Real Sociedad	Villarreal
21:00 CET	Rossi 41', 47'; Cani (yellow card) 18'	(Report)	30', (yellow card) 60' Aranburu; (yellow card) 32' Prieto; (yellow card) 64' Sarpong; (yellow card) 77' González; (yellow card) 78' Griezmann	Stadium: Estadio El Madrigal; Attendance: 15,000; Referee: César Muñiz Fernández

29 January 2011 21	Real Sociedad	2 – 0	Almería	San Sebastián
17:00 CET	Ansotegi 45', (yellow card) 66'; Tamudo 78'; Bravo (yellow card) 64'	(Report)	(yellow card) 28' Jakobsen; (yellow card) 45' Bernardello; (yellow card) 77' García	Stadium: Anoeta; Referee: Carlos Clos Gómez

6 February 2011 22	Real Madrid	4 – 1	Real Sociedad	Madrid
19:00 CET	Kaká 8'; Ronaldo 21', 42'; Alonso (yellow card) 55'; Albiol (yellow card) 82'; Adebayor 89'	(Report)	(yellow card) 10' Prieto; (yellow card) 27' Rivas; 72' (o.g.) Arbeloa; (yellow card) 86' Estrada	Stadium: Santiago Bernabéu; Attendance: 70,000; Referee: Rafael Ramírez Domínguez

13 February 2011 23	Real Sociedad	1 – 0	Osasuna	San Sebastián
17:00 CET	Tamudo 73'; Bergara (yellow card) 81'	(Report)	(yellow card) 21' Flaño; (yellow card) 53' Josetxo; (yellow card) 60' Damià; (yellow card) 71' Calleja	Stadium: Anoeta; Attendance: 25,000; Referee: Javier Turienzo Álvarez

21 February 2011 24	Real Sociedad	1 – 0	Mallorca	San Sebastián
21:00 CET	Tamudo 56'; Aranburu (yellow card) 79'	(Report)	(yellow card) 39' De Guzmán; (yellow card) 67' Kevin	Stadium: Anoeta; Attendance: 18,599; Referee: Antonio Rubinos Pérez

26 February 2011 25	Espanyol	4 – 1	Real Sociedad	Cornellà de Llobregat
18:00 CET	Galán (yellow card) 30'; Estrada 41' (o.g.); García 54'; Callejón 81'; Márquez 90'	(Report)	43' Estrada; (yellow card) 53' Illarramendi	Stadium: Cornellà-El Prat; Referee: Miguel Ángel Ayza Gámez

2 March 2011 26	Levante	1 – 1	Real Sociedad	San Sebastián
20:00 CET	Zurutuza 53'; Sutil (yellow card) 90'	(Report)	(yellow card) 8' Juanfran; (yellow card) 39' Munúa; (yellow card) 54' Venta; 77' Del Herno; (yellow card) 87' Ballesteros	Stadium: Anoeta; Referee: David Fernández Borbalán

7 March 2011 27	Deportivo de La Coruña	2 – 1	Real Sociedad	A Coruña
21:00 CET	Riki 41'; Adrián 57'; Colotto (yellow card) 73'; Pérez (yellow card) 85'	(Report)	65' Agirretxe; (yellow card) 69' Illarramendi	Stadium: Riazor; Referee: Antonio Mateu Lahoz

13 March 2011 28	Real Sociedad	0 – 2	Málaga	San Sebastián
17:00 CET	(yellow card) 2' Rivas; (yellow card) 44' Estrada	(Report)	25' Duda; 58' Rondón; (yellow card) 64' Weligton; (yellow card) 73' Caballero	Stadium: Anoeta; Referee: Alberto Undiano Mallenco

20 March 2011 29	Racing Santander	2 – 1	Real Sociedad	Santander
17:00 CET	Bakircioglu 43'; Dos Santos 77'; Lacen (yellow card) 68'	(Report)	(yellow card) 31', (goal) 72' Griezmann; (yellow card) 89' Labaka	Stadium: Estadio El Sardinero; Referee: José Luis Paradas Romero

3 April 2011 30	Real Sociedad	1 – 3	Hércules	San Sebastián
17:00 CET	(yellow card) 20' Tamudo; (yellow card) 79', (goal) 90' Ifrán	(Report)	(yellow card) 11' Femenía; (yellow card) 13' Aguilar; (yellow card) 35' Juanra; (yellow card) 51' Farinós; 70' Portillo; (yellow card) 82' Calatayud; 84', 89' Drenthe	Stadium: Anoeta; Referee: Carlos Velasco Carballo

10 April 2011 31	Atlético Madrid	3 – 0	Real Sociedad	Madrid
19:00 CET	Filipe Luís 12'; Suárez 45'; Tiago (yellow card) 72'; Agüero 78', (yellow card) 88'	(Report)	(yellow card) 69' Demidov	Stadium: Estadio Vicente Calderón; Referee: Alfonso Álvarez Izquierdo

17 April 2011 32	Real Sociedad	2 – 1	Sporting de Gijón	San Sebastián
17:00 CET	Labaka (yellow card) 11'; Estrada (yellow card) 27'; Griezmann 32', 79'; Tamudo (yellow card) 90'; Demidov (yellow card) 90'	(Report)	(yellow card) 54' Rivera; 69' De las Cuevas; (yellow card) 86' José Ángel	Stadium: Anoeta; Referee: Ignacio Iglesias Villanueva

23 April 2011 33	Athletic Bilbao	2 – 1	Real Sociedad	Bilbao
22:00 CET	Muniain 18'; Toquero 28', (yellow card) 84'; Orbaiz (yellow card) 66'; San José (yellow card) 71'; Gurpegui (yellow card) 84'; Amorebieta (yellow card) 89'; De Marcos (yellow card) 90'	(Report)	31' (o.g.) Martínez; (yellow card) 36' Aranburu; (yellow card) 62' Tamudo	Stadium: San Mamés; Referee: David Fernández Borbalán

30 April 2011 34	Real Sociedad	2 – 1	Barcelona	San Sebastián
20:00 CET	Tamudo (yellow card) 11'; Ifrán 71'; Prieto 82'; Estrada (yellow card) 90'	(Report)	29' Thiago; (yellow card) 81' Mascherano	Stadium: Anoeta; Referee: Fernando Teixeira Vitienes

7 May 2011 35	Valencia	3 – 0	Real Sociedad	Valencia
18:00 CET	Soldado 16', 37'; Jonas 25'; Mathieu (yellow card) 71'	(Report)	(yellow card) 53' De la Bella	Stadium: Mestalla; Referee: José Luis González

11 May 2011 36	Real Sociedad	2 – 1	Zaragoza	San Sebastián
20:00 CET	Tamudo 24'; Aranburu 88'; Griezmann (yellow card) 9'; Zurutuza (yellow card) 15'; Tamudo (yellow card) 73'; Ifrán (yellow card) 85'; Prieto (yellow card) 80'	(Report)	53' Gabi; (yellow card) 26' Lanzaro; (yellow card) 45' Herrera	Stadium: Anoeta; Referee: Alfonso Álvarez Izquierdo

15 May 2011 37	Sevilla	3 – 1	Real Sociedad	Seville
21:00 CET	Escudé (yellow card) 45'; Kanouté (yellow card) 52', (goal) 54', 60'; Negredo (yellow card) 82', (goal) 85'	(Report)	(yellow card) 13' Elustondo; (yellow card) 71' Bergara; 72' Agirretxe; (yellow card) 81' Labaka	Stadium: Ramón Sánchez Pizjuán; Referee: Javier Turienzo Álvarez

21 May 2011 38	Real Sociedad	1 – 1	Getafe	San Sebastián
22:00 CET	Sutil 66', (yellow card) 90'	(Report)	9' Díaz; (yellow card) 33' Álvarez	Stadium: Anoeta; Referee: Fernando Teixeira Vitienes

== Copa del Rey ==
28 October 2010 4th	Real Sociedad	2 – 3	Almería	San Sebastián
21:00 CET	Sarpong 7'; Elustondo 31'; Estrada (yellow card) 17'; Elustondo (yellow card) 88'	[[[Category:All articles with unsourced statements]] (Report)]	66' Goitom; 71', 88' Ulloa; (yellow card) 77' Michel	Stadium: Anoeta; Attendance: ? Referee: César Muñiz Fernández

10 November 2010 4th	Almería	2 – 1	Real Sociedad	Almería
21:00 CET	Ulloa 47', (yellow card) 53'; Goitom 20'; Jakobsen (yellow card) 59'	[[[Category:All articles with unsourced statements]] (Report)]	50' Agirretxe; (yellow card) 62' Llorente	Stadium: Estadio de los Juegos Mediterráneos; Attendance: ? Referee: Antonio Mateu Lahoz

As a result of losing on a 5–3 aggregate, Real Sociedad were knocked out

== See also ==
- 2010–11 Copa del Rey
- 2010–11 La Liga
