= Toño Ramírez =

Spanish footballer

Toño
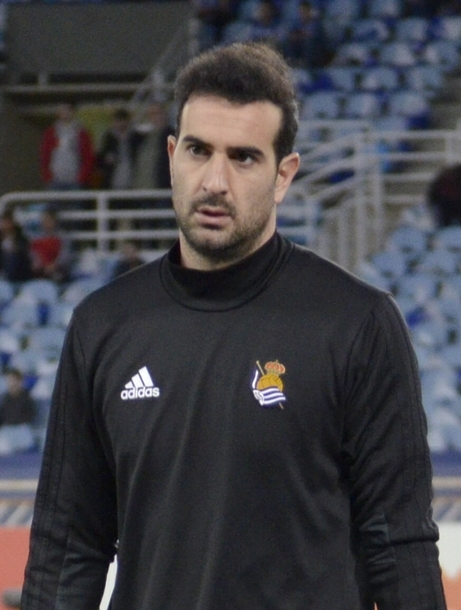
- Toño with Real Sociedad in 2018

Personal information
- Full name: Antonio Ramírez Martínez
- Date of birth: 23 November 1986 (age 39)
- Place of birth: Logroño, Spain
- Height: 1.91 m (6 ft 3 in)
- Position: Goalkeeper

Team information
- Current team: Náxara
- Number: 1

Youth career
- Valvanera

Senior career*
Years	Team	Apps	(Gls)
2004–2005	UPV		
2005–2011	Real Sociedad B	82	(0)
2009–2012	Real Sociedad	2	(0)
2009–2010	→ Tenerife B (loan)	34	(0)
2012–2013	Guadalajara	16	(0)
2013–2014	Cultural Leonesa	31	(0)
2014–2016	AEK Larnaca	56	(0)
2016–2018	Real Sociedad	4	(0)
2018–2021	AEK Larnaca	64	(0)
2021–2023	Racing Rioja	40	(0)
2023–	Náxara	75	(0)
- * Club domestic league appearances and goals as of 14 May 2026

Antonio Ramírez Martínez (born 23 November 1986), commonly known as Toño, is a Spanish professional footballer who plays as a goalkeeper for Tercera Federación club Náxara CD.

== Club career ==
Born in Logroño, La Rioja, Toño was a Valvanera CD youth graduate. In the summer of 2005, after making his senior debut for the football team of the University of the Basque Country, he moved to Real Sociedad and was assigned to their reserves in the Segunda División B.

Toño made his first-team debut on 14 June 2009, coming on as a first-half substitute for Javi Ros in a 1–1 Segunda División home draw against Levante UD as the starter Eñaut Zubikarai was sent off. In July 2009 he was loaned to CD Tenerife from La Liga, but appeared exclusively for the B side also in the third tier.

In June 2011, after another campaign at Sanse, Toño was definitely promoted to the main squad as third choice to Claudio Bravo and Zubikarai. After making no competitive appearances, he signed for division two club CD Guadalajara.

Toño appeared sparingly for the Castile-La Mancha team, also suffering administrative relegation. On 16 August 2013, he joined Cultural y Deportiva Leonesa in the third division.

On 25 June 2014, Toño moved abroad for the first time in his career, signing for AEK Larnaca FC in Cyprus. He started during the vast majority of his spell, beating competition of Alexandre Negri and compatriot Mikel Saizar.

On 23 June 2016, Toño returned to Real Sociedad after agreeing to a two-year contract. Completely barred by Gerónimo Rulli, he only made his official debut on 26 October of the following year, keeping a clean sheet in a 1–0 away win over Lleida Esportiu in the round of 32 of the Copa del Rey.

Toño's first appearance in the Spanish top division took place on 27 January 2018 (at the age of 31 years and two months), in a 4–2 defeat at Villarreal CF. On 28 June, he returned to AEK for a second spell.

Toño returned to Spain in summer 2021, with Racing Rioja CF of the newly-formed Segunda División RFEF.

== Career statistics ==
As of match played 5 May 2024

Appearances and goals by club, season and competition
Club	Season	League			National cup		Continental		Other		Total	
Club	Season	Division	Apps	Goals	Apps	Goals	Apps	Goals	Apps	Goals	Apps	Goals
Real Sociedad B	2005–06	Segunda División B	9	0	—		—		—		9	0
Real Sociedad B	2006–07	Segunda División B	16	0	—		—		—		16	0
Real Sociedad B	2007–08	Segunda División B	14	0	—		—		—		14	0
Real Sociedad B	2008–09	Segunda División B	17	0	—		—		—		17	0
Real Sociedad B	2010–11	Segunda División B	26	0	—		—		—		26	0
Real Sociedad B	Total		82	0	—		—		—		2	0
Real Sociedad	2008–09	Segunda División	2	0	0	0	—		—		2	0
Real Sociedad	2009–10	Segunda División	0	0	0	0	—		—		0	0
Real Sociedad	2010–11	La Liga	0	0	0	0	—		—		0	0
Real Sociedad	2011–12	La Liga	0	0	0	0	—		—		0	0
Real Sociedad	Total		2	0	3	0	—		—		2	0
Tenerife B (loan)	2009–10	Segunda División B	34	0	—		—		—		34	0
Guadalajara	2012–13	Segunda División	16	0	0	0	—		—		16	0
Cultural Leonesa	2013–14	Segunda División B	31	0	—		—		—		31	0
AEK Larnaca	2014–15	Cypriot First Division	24	0	1	0	—		—		25	0
AEK Larnaca	2015–16	Cypriot First Division	32	0	2	0	2	0	—		36	0
AEK Larnaca	Total		56	0	3	0	2	0	—		61	0
Real Sociedad	2016–17	La Liga	0	0	0	0	—		—		0	0
Real Sociedad	2017–18	La Liga	4	0	2	0	1	0	—		7	0
Real Sociedad	Total		4	0	2	0	1	0	—		7	0
AEK Larnaca	2018–19	Cypriot First Division	31	0	4	0	11	0	1	0	47	0
AEK Larnaca	2019–20	Cypriot First Division	23	0	2	0	6	0	—		31	0
AEK Larnaca	2020–21	Cypriot First Division	10	0	1	0	—		—		11	0
AEK Larnaca	Total		64	0	7	0	17	0	1	0	89	0
Racing Rioja	2021–22	Segunda División RFEF	29	0	0	0	—		—		29	0
Racing Rioja	2022–23	Segunda Federación	11	0	0	0	—		—		11	0
Racing Rioja	Total		40	0	0	0	—		—		40	0
Náxara	2023–24	Segunda Federación	19	0	0	0	—		—		19	0
Career total			348	0	15	0	20	0	1	0	384	0

== Honours ==
AEK Larnaca

- Cypriot Super Cup: 2018
