= Cristian Ramos =

Cristian Ramos may refer to:

- Cristian García Ramos (b. 1981), Spanish footballer
- Christian Ramos, Peruvian footballer who played at the 2007 South American Youth Championship
