= Mikel Aranburu =

Spanish footballer (born 1979)

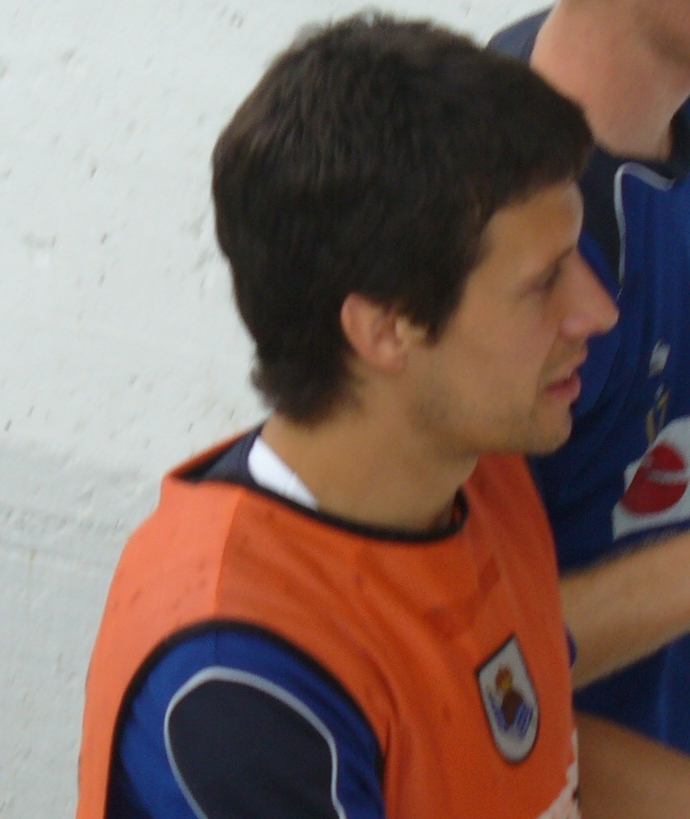

Personal information
- Full name: Mikel Aranburu Eizagirre
- Date of birth: 18 February 1979 (age 47)
- Place of birth: Azpeitia, Spain
- Height: 1.80 m (5 ft 11 in)
- Position: Midfielder

Youth career
- Lagun Onak
- Real Sociedad

Senior career*
Years	Team	Apps	(Gls)
1996–1999	Real Sociedad B	88	(10)
1997–2012	Real Sociedad	402	(31)
Total		490	(41)

International career
2002–2011	Basque Country	9	(0)
- * Club domestic league appearances and goals

Mikel Aranburu Eizagirre (born 18 February 1979) is a Spanish former professional footballer who played as a midfielder.

He spent his entire career with Real Sociedad, appearing in 427 official matches for the club and scoring 32 goals.

== Club career ==
Born in Azpeitia, Gipuzkoa, Aranburu made his professional debut aged 18, in the last round of 1996–97 against CD Logroñés, courtesy of manager Javier Irureta. From his fourth season onwards he became a full member of the main squad, being essential as the Basques finished second in La Liga in 2002–03 by contributing 34 games and two goals.

Aranburu was seriously injured in 2005–06, and returned to major action only to see Real be relegated the following year, the first time in four decades. He continued to be an important first-team member during the Segunda División campaigns, appearing in 35 matches in 2009–10 to help the Txuriurdin to return to the top flight after three years.

In 2010–11, Aranburu was once again first-choice, partnering Diego Rivas in central defensive midfield in most of the games. He equalled a career-best five goals, including two in a 4–0 away win over Getafe CF – he only played five minutes in the match– and the all-important last-minute winner at home against Real Zaragoza in the 36th round (2–1), as the side narrowly retained their league status.

== Honours ==
- Segunda División: 2009–10

== See also ==
- List of one-club men in association football
- List of Real Sociedad players
