= Francisco Sutil =

Spanish footballer

Paco Sutil
Personal information
- Full name: Francisco Sutil Tirado
- Date of birth: 21 December 1984 (age 41)
- Place of birth: Jaén, Spain
- Height: 1.73 m (5 ft 8 in)
- Position: Winger

Youth career
- Jaén

Senior career*
Years	Team	Apps	(Gls)
2000–2002	Jaén B		
2001–2002	→ Úbeda (loan)	21	(9)
2002–2008	Jaén	143	(7)
2008–2010	Eibar	74	(11)
2010–2011	Real Sociedad	17	(2)
2011–2013	Murcia	52	(3)
2013–2014	Sabadell	7	(0)
2014–2016	Jaén	49	(3)
2016–2017	Antequera	24	(2)
2017–2020	Martos	85	(11)
2020–2021	Baeza	2	(0)
2021	La Guardia	6	(4)
2022	Fuensanta	2	(0)
Total		482	(52)
- * Club domestic league appearances and goals

Francisco "Paco" Sutil Tirado (born 21 December 1984) is a Spanish former professional footballer who played as a left winger.

He spent most of his career with Real Jaén, appearing in 100 Segunda División games over four seasons with that club, Murcia and Sabadell (six goals scored). In 2010–11, he competed in La Liga with Real Sociedad.

== Club career ==
=== Jaén ===
Born in Jaén, Andalusia, Sutil began his career at hometown club Real Jaén, playing in its reserve team and on loan at amateurs Úbeda CF before making his debut in the first team on 31 August 2002 in a 2–1 away loss against CD Linares in the Segunda División B.

He spent six seasons with the main squad, always at that level.

=== Eibar ===
Sutil moved to SD Eibar of Segunda División in June 2008. His debut as a professional took place on 3 September, when he started a 1–0 defeat at CD Castellón in the second round of the Copa del Rey. He played his first league game ten days later, coming on as a half-time substitute for Josu Etxaniz as the team fell 2–0 away to SD Huesca.

On 21 February 2009, Sutil volleyed the decisive goal in a 2–1 away win over RC Celta de Vigo. He contributed a further two in 37 games, as the campaign ended in relegation.

=== Real Sociedad ===
On 29 June 2010, following an eight-goal haul in the following campaign back in the third division, Sutil signed a two-year contract with the option of a third with another Basque club, Real Sociedad. His La Liga debut came two months later, featuring 61 minutes of the 1–0 victory against Villarreal CF at the Anoeta Stadium.

Sutil scored his first goal for the Txurri-Urdin on 13 September 2010, putting them back into the lead in an eventual 2–2 draw at UD Almería. Of his 14 subsequent games over the season only two were starts, and in the final game, at home to Getafe CF, he came on at the interval in place of David Zurutuza and equalised a 1–1 draw.

=== Later career ===
On 1 August 2011, Sutil agreed to a three-year deal with Real Murcia CF in the second tier. After two years of relative playing time, he joined another team from the same league, CE Sabadell FC, for one season. An internal disciplinary hearing was taken on him in late December for undisclosed reasons, and having collected only 233 minutes of action for the Catalans, his contract was terminated on 10 January 2014.

After offering his services for a nominal salary at La Hoya Lorca CF to be nearer to his Murcian girlfriend, Sutil returned to Real Jaén on 28 January, making four substitute appearances as the side suffered relegation to the third division. Following the appointment of manager Gonzalo Arconada in the 2015 off-season, he was soon deemed surplus to requirements, moving to Antequera CF in the Tercera División in July 2016.

Sutil retired in 2022 aged 37, with all of his last clubs competing in Andalusian amateur football.
