= Salva (footballer, born 1981) =

Spanish footballer

Personal information
- Full name: Salvador Fúnez Sardina
- Date of birth: 2 June 1981 (age 45)
- Place of birth: Madrid, Spain
- Height: 1.83 m (6 ft 0 in)
- Position: Centre-back

Youth career
- Leganés

Senior career*
Years	Team	Apps	(Gls)
1999–2003	Leganés B		
2000–2003	Leganés	11	(0)
2003–2006	Alicante	81	(2)
2006–2007	Alcorcón	33	(0)
2007–2011	Rayo Vallecano	75	(2)
Total		200+	(4+)

Managerial career
- 2013–2017: Rayo Vallecano (assistant youth)
- 2017–2019: Rayo Vallecano (assistant)
- 2019–2021: Huesca (assistant)
- 2021–2026: Girona (assistant)
- * Club domestic league appearances and goals

Salvador Fúnez Sardina (born 2 June 1981), commonly known as Salva, is a Spanish former professional footballer who played as a central defender.

== Playing career ==
Born in Madrid, Salva's professional input consisted of 67 Segunda División matches over four seasons, with Leganés and Rayo Vallecano. He retired at the end of 2010–11 aged 30 as the latter club had just promoted to La Liga, due to a knee injury.

Salva scored his only goal in the second tier on 16 May 2009, opening the 5–0 win against Córdoba for Rayo.

== Coaching career ==
After retiring, Salva worked as an assistant manager under his former teammate Míchel at that team (main and youth squads), Huesca and Girona.
