= Claudio Bravo =

Chilean footballer (born 1983)

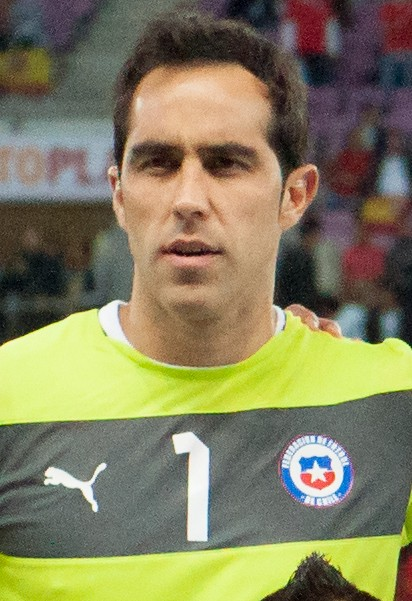
- Bravo lining up for Chile in 2013

Personal information
- Full name: Claudio Andrés Bravo Muñoz
- Date of birth: 13 April 1983 (age 43)
- Place of birth: Viluco, Chile
- Height: 1.84 m (6 ft 0 in)
- Position: Goalkeeper

Youth career
- Colo-Colo

Senior career*
Years	Team	Apps	(Gls)
2002–2006	Colo-Colo	123	(0)
2006–2014	Real Sociedad	229	(1)
2014–2016	Barcelona	70	(0)
2016–2020	Manchester City	29	(0)
2020–2024	Betis	56	(0)
Total		507	(1)

International career
2004	Chile U23	7	(0)
2004–2024	Chile	150	(0)
Medal record
Men's football
Representing Chile
Copa América
Winner	2015 Chile
Winner	2016 United States
FIFA Confederations Cup
Runner-up	2017 Russia
- * Club domestic league appearances and goals

Claudio Andrés Bravo Muñoz (Spanish: [ˈklawðjo ˈβɾaβo]; born 13 April 1983) is a Chilean former professional footballer who played as a goalkeeper.

Bravo began his career with Colo-Colo and moved to Real Sociedad in 2006, appearing in 237 official games with the latter club. Barcelona signed him for €12 million in 2014, and he won the treble and the Zamora Trophy in his first season. In the summer of 2016, he moved to Manchester City, where he won several titles. After four years in England, Bravo returned to Spain, signing for Real Betis, before announcing his retirement in 2024 at the age of 41.

With 150 total appearances, Bravo is the third-most capped player in the history of the Chile national team, behind only Alexis Sánchez and Gary Medel. He represented the nation in two FIFA World Cups, a FIFA Confederations Cup, and seven Copa América tournaments, captaining his side to victory at the 2015 and 2016 editions of the latter competition.

== Club career ==
=== Colo-Colo ===
Bravo was born in Viluco, Maipo Province. His father recognized his son's emerging talent and took him to Colo-Colo's youth academy, and he eventually made his professional debut in 2002. There, he was given the nickname Cóndor Chico, after former club goalkeeper Roberto Rojas. Similarly, during that years he complemented his football career with technical studies of physical activity at the University of the Americas, where he had as classmates to his teammates Fernando Meneses, Luis Mena and Miguel Riffo.

After an injury to Eduardo Lobos, manager Jaime Pizarro gave Bravo his first chance, which would be however short-lived, as he too was injured, which prompted the subsequent signing of Jonny Walker. He recovered in mid-2003, and with Lobos still in the sidelines he took over the starting role which he would never lose again, with his competitor eventually being sold.

In 2006, Bravo won his first title, making an acrobatic save in the Apertura's penalty shootout final win against arch-rival C.F. Universidad de Chile.

=== Real Sociedad ===
For the 2006–07 season, Bravo signed a five-year contract with Real Sociedad in Spain, in a reported €1.2 million deal – he and Asier Riesgo formed the youngest pair of goalkeepers that year in La Liga. He started on the bench, but eventually gained the battle for first-choice (29 games to nine) as the Basque side was relegated (despite this, he finished in fifth place for the Ricardo Zamora Trophy with a goal-against average of 1.00); his league debut came on 22 October 2006, in a 0–0 away draw against RCD Mallorca.

The following season, Riesgo reclaimed his starting position. For 2008–09, however, after Riesgo was loaned to Recreativo, Bravo was again the starter, but Real remained in Segunda División. He was the joint-recipient of the campaign's Zamora, alongside David Cobeño of Rayo Vallecano.

On 24 January 2010, Bravo was sent off for the first time in a loss to Elche CF at Anoeta Stadium, fouling Óscar Trejo in the ninth minute, from which Jorge Molina scored a penalty for the only goal of the game. Three weeks later, he scored the first goal of his career, from a direct free kick against Gimnàstic de Tarragona, the game's only in a home triumph; however, shortly after, he suffered a severe knee injury during Real Sociedad's 2–0 loss at Córdoba CF, which rendered him unavailable for the remainder of the season. He still featured in 25 matches to help his team finish champions and return to the top division, after three years.

=== Barcelona ===
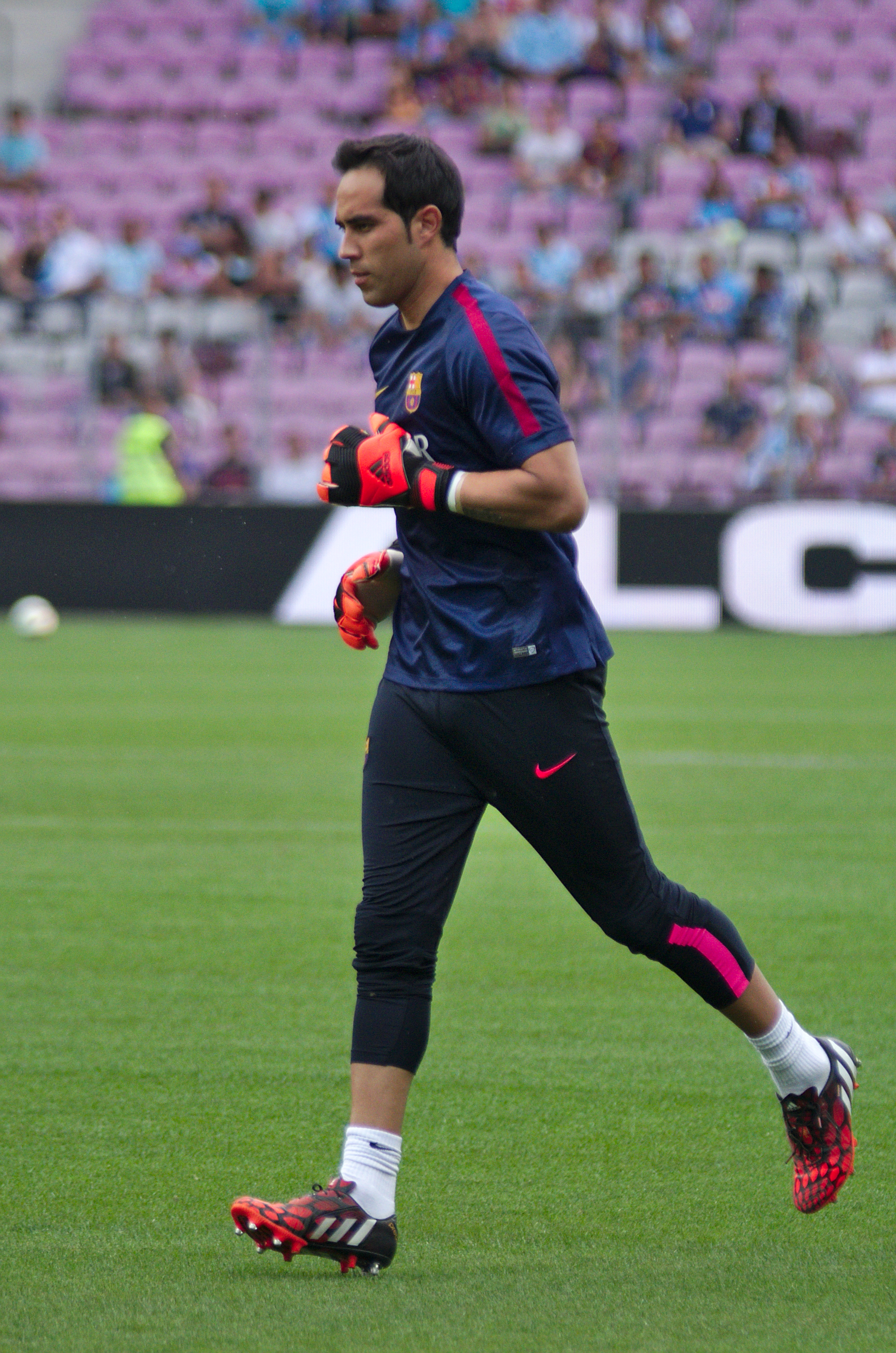
Bravo warming up for Barcelona in 2014

Bravo joined Barcelona on 25 June 2014, with the four-year deal being made effective on 1 July for a reported €12 million (£9.7 million) fee, the fourth most expensive player ever sold by Real Sociedad after Darko Kovačević, Xabi Alonso and Asier Illarramendi, becoming the second Chilean to ever play for the club after Alexis Sánchez and succeeding Víctor Valdés as the first-choice. After joining, he set a Spanish League record for the club of not conceding from the start of season for 754 minutes, previously held by Pedro María Artola with 560 minutes; the streak was broken when he conceded his first goal of the season from the penalty spot to Cristiano Ronaldo in a 1–3 defeat to Real Madrid at the Santiago Bernabéu.

After playing 37 straight league games, Bravo was rested for the last game of the campaign against Deportivo de La Coruña, with Jordi Masip starting instead. Bravo was named as the goalkeeper in the La Liga Team of the Season as one of six Barcelona players, including three of his defenders. He won the Zamora for the best goals against average in the competition, conceding 19 times for an average of 0.51, just off the all-time record of 0.47 by Francisco Liaño of Deportivo in 1994.

After Marc-André ter Stegen was preferred for Barcelona's wins in the year's Copa del Rey, UEFA Champions League and UEFA Super Cup, Bravo made his cup debut for the team as they won the 2015 FIFA Club World Cup, keeping clean sheets in their 3–0 wins over Guangzhou Evergrande and River Plate in Japan. Interviewed by Esport3 on the subject of the rotation, he said "If I were to say that I'm taking it well, I would be lying, but I accept it".

=== Manchester City ===
On 25 August 2016, Bravo signed a four-year deal for English club Manchester City for a reported fee of £17 million. He made his debut on 10 September in a 2–1 triumph over local rivals Manchester United, being at fault for the opposition's goal and receiving widespread criticism for his performance, although manager Pep Guardiola said that he had "one of the best performances I've ever seen". On his return to the Camp Nou on 19 October 2016, in a Champions League group stage match, Bravo was sent off after handling the ball outside of his area, in an eventual 4–0 loss. After a number of high-profile errors, including being beaten by all six shots on target in his previous two appearances for City, he was dropped to the bench in February 2017, with backup Willy Caballero replacing him; having finished with the worst save success rate (54.1%) among all goalkeepers, he was named by many journalists as one of the worst signings of the season.

On 24 October 2017, after a 0–0 home draw against Wolverhampton Wanderers in the first 120 minutes of the EFL Cup fourth-round tie, Bravo saved two penalties to give his team a 4–1 win. In the next round of the cup, Bravo was the hero again as he saved the last penalty in a shootout against Leicester City, after a 1–1 draw. On 25 February 2018, Bravo started in the EFL Cup final against Arsenal and got the assist for Sergio Agüero's opening goal in a 3–0 victory at Wembley Stadium, winning his first trophy with the club.

Several days after winning the Community Shield in August 2018 against Chelsea, he ruptured his Achilles tendon in training, going on to be sidelined for several months. He missed the entirety of the 2018–19 season, with Aro Muric replacing him as City's second choice goalkeeper. He did not play again until the next edition of the tournament, when he saved from Georginio Wijnaldum to win the penalty shootout against Liverpool, earning praise from Guardiola.

Bravo came on as a half-time substitute for the injured Ederson Moraes on 6 November 2019, in a Champions League group game at Atalanta. He was sent off in the 81st minute for a foul on Josip Iličić, which meant that defender Kyle Walker had to come on as the goalkeeper for the final minutes.

On 1 March 2020, City won the EFL Cup for the third time in a row, beating Aston Villa 2–1 in the final. Bravo made a late save from Björn Engels to preserve City's lead, pushing his header onto the post. He left in August when his contract expired.

=== Real Betis ===
On 30 August 2020, Bravo signed an initial one-year deal with Spanish club Real Betis, with an option for a second year. In his first season, he was marred by injuries and compatriot manager Manuel Pellegrini preferred to play Joel Robles in his place.

=== Retirement ===
On 26 August 2024, Bravo announced his retirement from professional football at the age of 41.

== International career ==
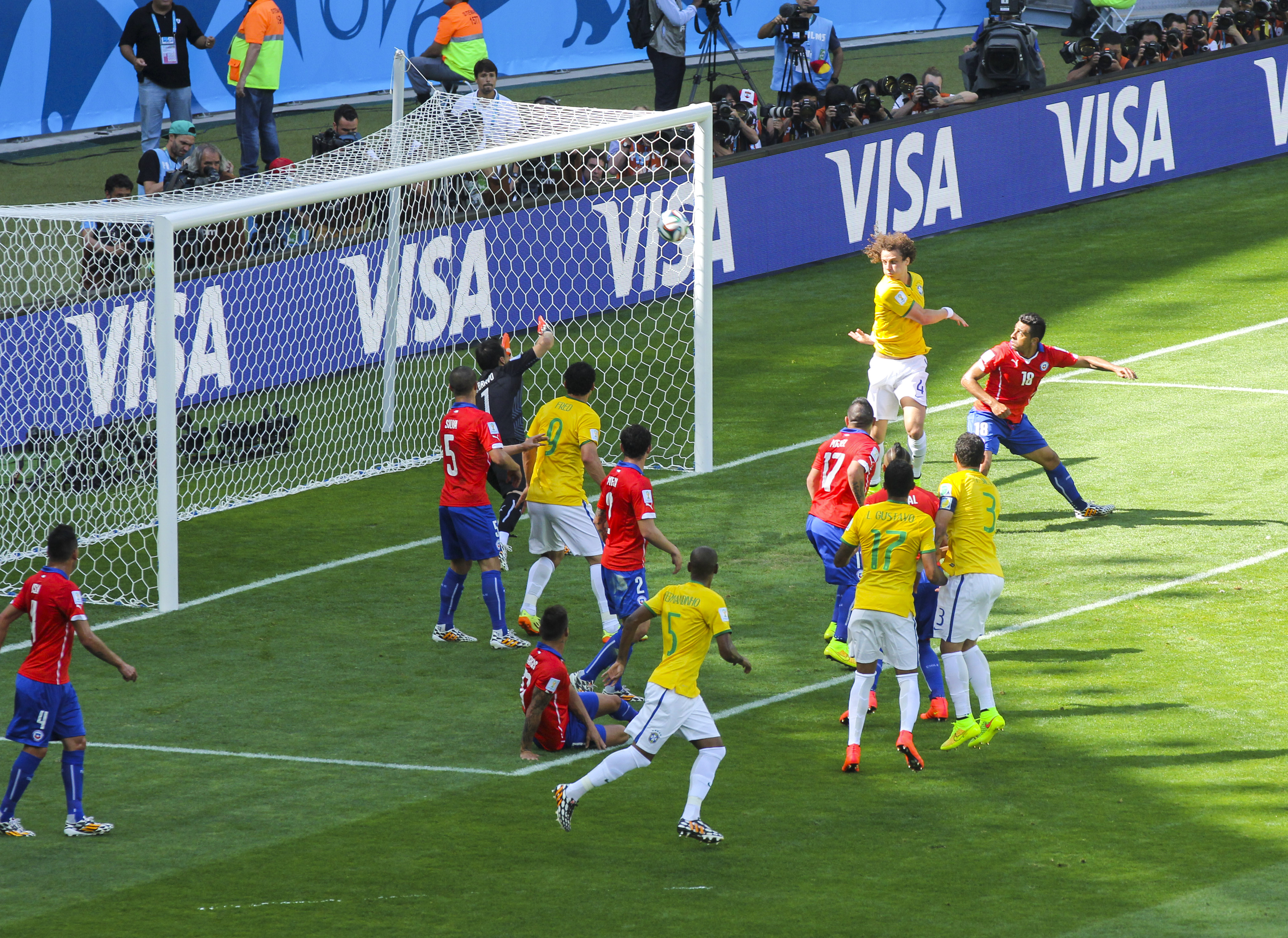
Bravo in action against Brazil at the 2014 World Cup

Bravo represented Chile at under-17, under-20 and under-23 levels. He made his debut with the full side on 11 July 2004 against Paraguay in the 2004 Copa América, and retained his place for the rest of the 2006 FIFA World Cup qualifiers.

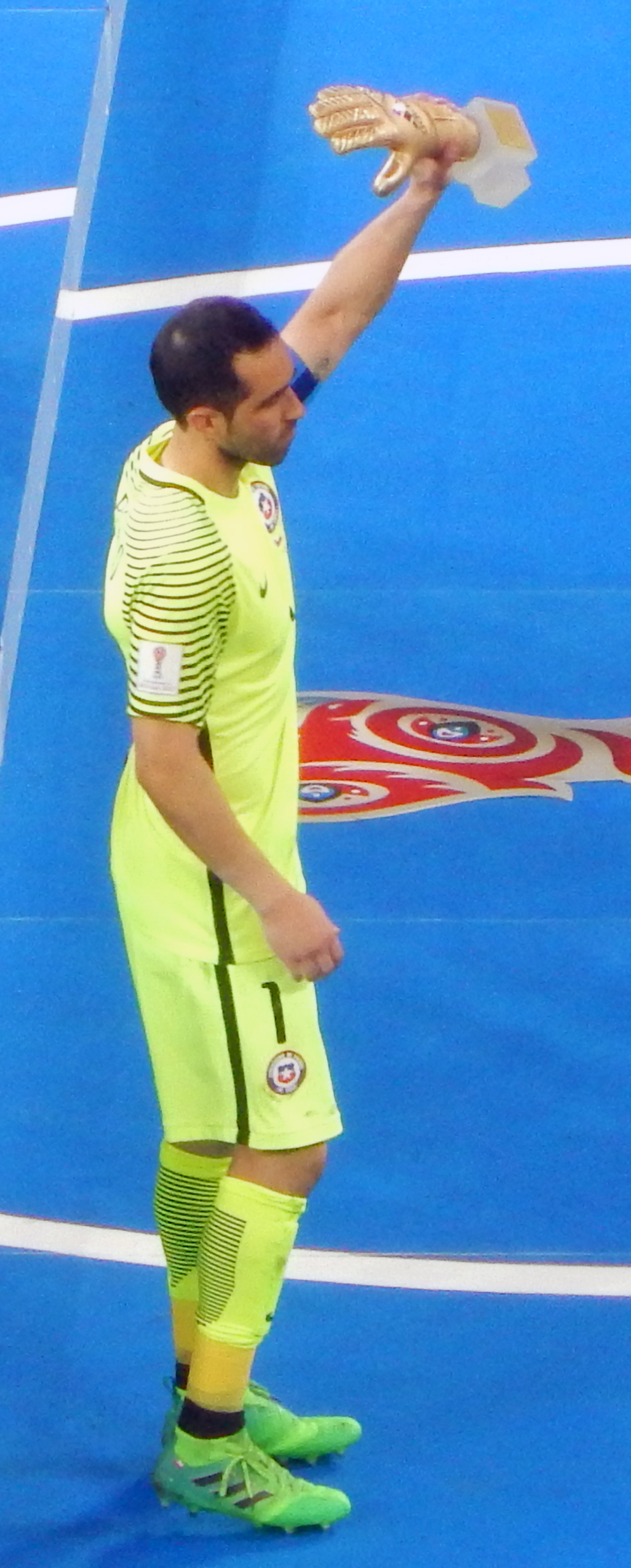
Bravo holding the Golden Glove award at the 2017 Confederations Cup

Bravo was again called for duty in the 2007 Copa América held in Venezuela, where he started all four games. He became team captain after Marcelo Salas announced his international retirement. Rested for the final group game, he played three matches at the 2011 Copa América as the country again reached the quarter-finals.

In the 2010 World Cup in South Africa, Bravo started in all four matches for Chile (remaining as captain), conceding five goals in an eventual 3–0 round-of-16 loss against Brazil. He was also selected by new manager Jorge Sampaoli to the squad of 23 for the following edition, starting all the games and conceding only four times – one by Australia, two by the Netherlands and one by Brazil – which again ended in the same stage and at the hands of the same opponent, but in a penalty shootout.

On 10 October 2014, in a friendly 3–0 win against Peru, Bravo earned his 85th cap, surpassing Leonel Sánchez as Chile's most capped player of all time. He was the captain and played every minute as they won the 2015 Copa América on home soil, their first major international honour. In the final against Argentina at the Estadio Nacional, he kept a clean sheet as the match finished goalless after extra time, and then saved from Éver Banega in the subsequent penalty shootout; he was subsequently chosen for the Team of the Tournament.

On 24 March 2016, Bravo became the first Chilean to win his 100th cap, in a 2–1 home loss to Argentina in qualification for the 2018 World Cup. In June 2016, he again captained Chile in the Copa América Centenario, during the final at MetLife Stadium, against the same opponent and also on penalties, he saved Lucas Biglia's attempt in an eventual 4–2 win.

After sitting out the first two games at the 2017 FIFA Confederations Cup, due to fitness problems, Bravo started for the remainder of the tournament in Russia, notably saving all three penalty shootout attempts in the semi-finals against Portugal (0–0 after 120 minutes). Although his team lost out 1–0 to reigning World champions Germany in the final, his performances saw him being chosen the competition's best goalkeeper.

In August 2023, for Chile's friendly match, Bravo chose not to participate, which resulted in him not being called again for the national team by Eduardo Berizzo.

=== Peru controversy ===
On 13 October 2015, Peru and Chile played a 2018 World Cup qualifier at the Estadio Nacional del Perú. The match ended 4–3 in favor of Chile. Prior to the start of the game the home crowd booed the playing of Chile's national anthem and in response a defiant message was left in the Chilean team's dressing room. The message read: "RESPETO, POR AQUÍ PASÓ EL CAMPEÓN DE AMÉRICA" (Respect, The Champion of America passed through here). This event was criticized by the media in South America, and two years later a witness revealed that Bravo was the one who had left this message; additionally, the player was caught on camera kicking a door after the match.

== Style of play ==
An authoritative presence in goal, Bravo was known for his agility, composure, and shot-stopping ability, as well as his reflexes and concentration; he was also highly regarded for his control, distribution and skill with the ball at his feet. Due to his speed when rushing off his line to anticipate opponents who had beaten the offside trap, he was described as a sweeper keeper; he was also labelled as a playmaking goalkeeper, due to his ability to play the ball out from the back or launch attacks from goal kicks. Bravo also drew praise in the media for his leadership and mental strength. Moreover, he was known for his penalty–saving abilities. Bravo was regarded by several figures in the sport as one of the best goalkeepers in the world in his prime; however, he suffered a loss of form during his first season at Manchester City, which saw him lose his place in the starting line-up the following season.

== Post-retirement ==
In March 2025, Bravo signed with ESPN Chile as a football commentator.

== Career statistics ==
=== Club ===
Appearances and goals by club, season and competition
Club	Season	League			National cup (Note: Includes Copa del Rey and FA Cup)		League cup (Note: Includes EFL Cup)		Continental		Other		Total	
Club	Season	Division	Apps	Goals	Apps	Goals	Apps	Goals	Apps	Goals	Apps	Goals	Apps	Goals
Colo-Colo	2003	Chilean Primera División	25	0	—		—		1 (Note: Appearance(s) in Copa Libertadores)	0	—		26	0
Colo-Colo	2004	Chilean Primera División	40	0	—		—		5	0	—		45	0
Colo-Colo	2005	Chilean Primera División	39	0	—		—		2	0	—		41	0
Colo-Colo	2006	Chilean Primera División	19	0	—		—		2	0	—		21	0
Colo-Colo	Total		123	0	—		—		10	0	—		133	0
Real Sociedad	2006–07	La Liga	29	0	1	0	—		—		—		30	0
Real Sociedad	2007–08	Segunda División	0	0	0	0	—		—		—		0	0
Real Sociedad	2008–09	Segunda División	32	0	0	0	—		—		—		32	0
Real Sociedad	2009–10	Segunda División	25	1	0	0	—		—		—		25	1
Real Sociedad	2010–11	La Liga	38	0	0	0	—		—		—		38	0
Real Sociedad	2011–12	La Liga	37	0	0	0	—		—		—		37	0
Real Sociedad	2012–13	La Liga	31	0	0	0	—		—		—		31	0
Real Sociedad	2013–14	La Liga	37	0	0	0	—		7 (Note: Appearance(s) in UEFA Champions League)	0	—		44	0
Real Sociedad	Total		229	1	1	0	—		7	0	—		237	1
Barcelona	2014–15	La Liga	37	0	0	0	—		0	0	—		37	0
Barcelona	2015–16	La Liga	32	0	0	0	—		0	0	3 (Note: One appearance in Supercopa de España, two appearances in FIFA Club World Cup)	0	35	0
Barcelona	2016–17	La Liga	1	0	—		—		—		2 (Note: Appearance(s) in Supercopa de España)	0	3	0
Barcelona	Total		70	0	0	0	—		0	0	5	0	75	0
Manchester City	2016–17	Premier League	22	0	4	0	0	0	4	0	—		30	0
Manchester City	2017–18	Premier League	3	0	3	0	6	0	1	0	—		13	0
Manchester City	2018–19	Premier League	0	0	0	0	0	0	0	0	1 (Note: Appearance in FA Community Shield)	0	1	0
Manchester City	2019–20	Premier League	4	0	4	0	6	0	2	0	1	0	17	0
Manchester City	Total		29	0	11	0	12	0	7	0	2	0	61	0
Real Betis	2020–21	La Liga	20	0	1	0	—		—		—		21	0
Real Betis	2021–22	La Liga	17	0	2	0	—		4 (Note: Appearance(s) in UEFA Europa League)	0	—		23	0
Real Betis	2022–23	La Liga	12	0	2	0	—		6	0	1	0	21	0
Real Betis	2023–24	La Liga	7	0	0	0	—		2	0	—		9	0
Real Betis	Total		56	0	5	0	—		12	0	1	0	74	0
Career total			507	1	17	0	12	0	36	0	8	0	580	1

=== International ===
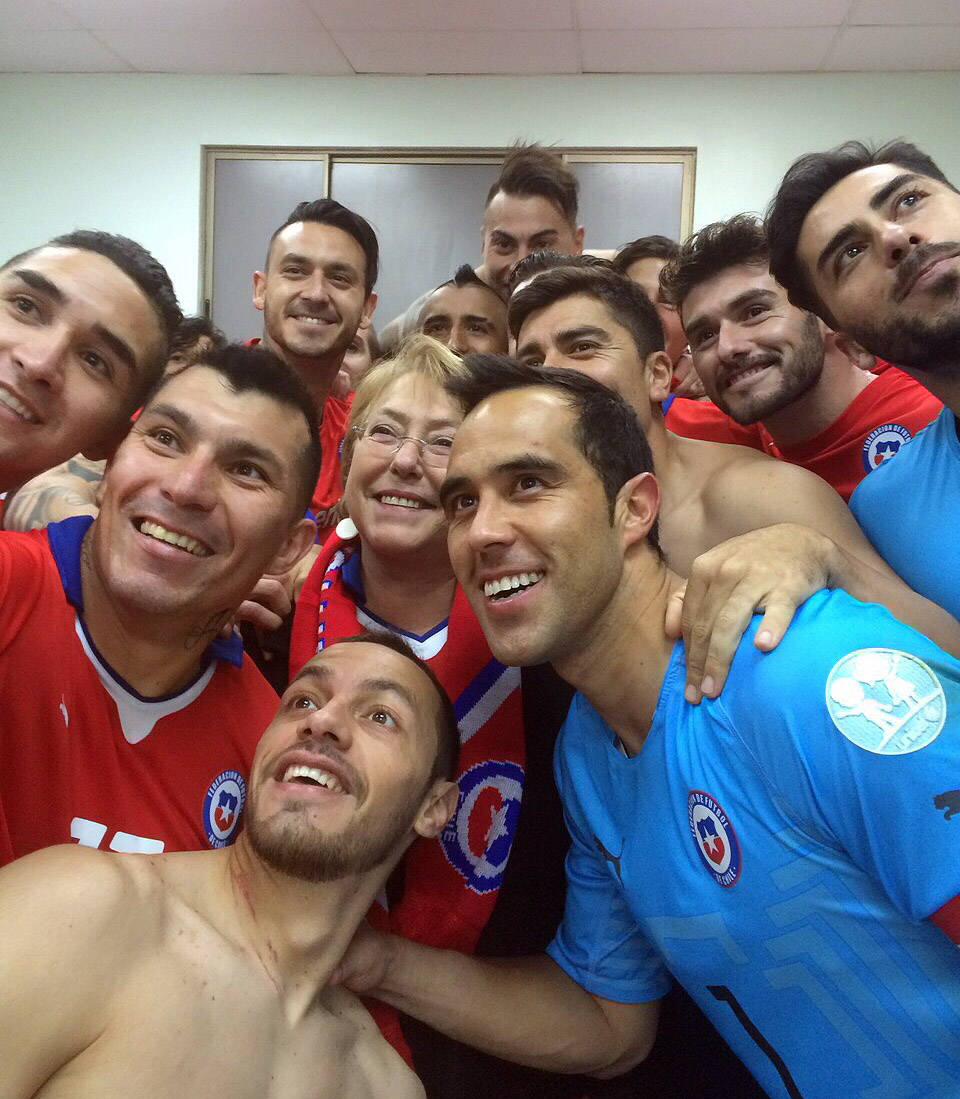
Bravo (front, in blue), with the rest of the Chilean squad and the nation's president Michelle Bachelet, ahead of the opening of the 2015 Copa América

Appearances and goals by national team and year
National team	Year	Apps	Goals
Chile	2004	1	0
Chile	2005	3	0
Chile	2006	5	0
Chile	2007	12	0
Chile	2008	10	0
Chile	2009	10	0
Chile	2010	7	0
Chile	2011	14	0
Chile	2012	4	0
Chile	2013	12	0
Chile	2014	9	0
Chile	2015	12	0
Chile	2016	11	0
Chile	2017	9	0
Chile	2018	0	0
Chile	2019	4	0
Chile	2020	2	0
Chile	2021	16	0
Chile	2022	3	0
Chile	2023	1	0
Chile	2024	5	0
Total		150	0

== Honours ==
Colo-Colo

- Campeonato Nacional: 2006 Torneo Apertura

Real Sociedad

- Segunda División: 2009–10

Barcelona

- La Liga: 2014–15, 2015–16
- Copa del Rey: 2014–15, 2015–16
- Supercopa de España: 2016
- UEFA Champions League: 2014–15
- UEFA Super Cup: 2015
- FIFA Club World Cup: 2015

Manchester City

- Premier League: 2017–18
- EFL Cup: 2017–18, 2019–20
- FA Community Shield: 2018, 2019

Real Betis

- Copa del Rey: 2021–22

Chile

- Copa América: 2015, 2016
- FIFA Confederations Cup runner-up: 2017

Individual

- Ricardo Zamora Trophy: 2008–09 Segunda División, 2014–15 La Liga
- Best Chilean Player Abroad: 2014
- La Liga Team of the Season: 2014–15
- Copa América Team of the Tournament: 2015 2016
- Copa América Best Goalkeeper: 2015, 2016
- FIFA Confederations Cup Golden Glove: 2017

== See also ==
- List of men's footballers with 100 or more international caps
