= Alberto de la Bella =

Spanish footballer (born 1985)

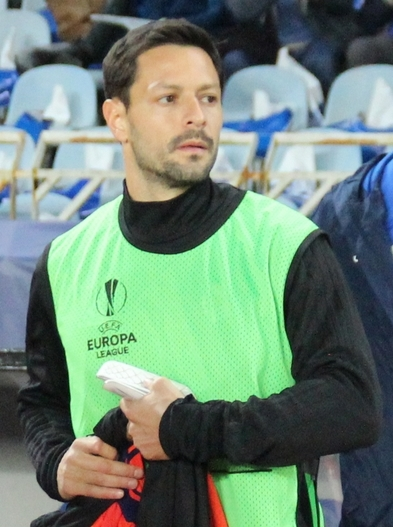
- De la Bella with Real Sociedad in 2018

Personal information
- Full name: Alberto de la Bella Madueño
- Date of birth: 2 December 1985 (age 40)
- Place of birth: Santa Coloma, Spain
- Height: 1.82 m (6 ft 0 in)
- Position: Left-back

Youth career
- 2003–2004: Gramenet

Senior career*
Years	Team	Apps	(Gls)
2004–2006	Gramenet	28	(0)
2004–2005	→ Espanyol B (loan)	18	(0)
2006–2008	Villarreal B	62	(1)
2008–2009	Sevilla B	28	(1)
2009–2018	Real Sociedad	189	(6)
2016–2017	→ Olympiacos (loan)	20	(2)
2018–2021	Las Palmas	57	(1)
2020–2021	→ Cartagena (loan)	21	(1)
2021–2022	Cartagena	15	(0)
Total		399	(11)

International career
2010–2016	Catalonia	4	(0)
- * Club domestic league appearances and goals

Alberto de la Bella Madueño (born 2 December 1985) is a Spanish former professional footballer who played as a left-back.

He spent the majority of his professional career with Real Sociedad, playing 218 competitive games for the club.

== Club career ==
Born in Santa Coloma de Gramenet, Barcelona, Catalonia, de la Bella started his career at local UDA Gramenet. Other than with this club, he only represented B teams in various parts of the country in four seasons, on loan and after being released (in 2008–09, he played with Sevilla FC's reserves in the Segunda División, being relegated).

In the summer of 2009, de la Bella signed with Real Sociedad in the same level, as a replacement for Athletic Bilbao-bound Xabi Castillo. He was also first choice during the league campaign, but achieved La Liga promotion this time, as champions.

De la Bella made his debut in the Spanish top flight on 29 August 2010, featuring the full 90 minutes in a 1–0 home win against Villarreal CF. In early May 2014, he renewed his contract with the Txuriurdin until 2018.

De la Bella played second-fiddle to Yuri Berchiche in 2015–16, appearing in only 16 competitive games. On 5 July 2016, he was loaned to Olympiacos F.C. for two years. The following 23 April, he scored his only two goals of the season to help his team defeat PAS Giannina F.C. 5–0 and clinch their seventh consecutive Super League Greece title.

On 27 July 2017, after being told he was not part of new manager Besnik Hasi's plans, de la Bella decided to return to Real Sociedad. On 27 August 2018, after nine years at the Anoeta, he joined second-tier club UD Las Palmas on a two-year deal with an option for a third.

On 10 September 2020, de la Bella was loaned to fellow second-division side FC Cartagena for the season. Having played over 20 games and avoided relegation, he was rewarded with a permanent contract for the following year.

De la Bella announced his retirement from professional football on 17 May 2022, at the age of 36.

== International career ==
Uncapped by Spain at any level, de la Bella was first called up to the unofficial Catalonia team in December 2010, for the Catalonia International Trophy against Honduras. He started in the 4–0 win at the Estadi Olímpic Lluís Companys on 28 December.

== Honours ==
Real Sociedad

- Segunda División: 2009–10

Olympiacos

- Super League Greece: 2016–17
