= Álvaro Jurado =

Spanish footballer

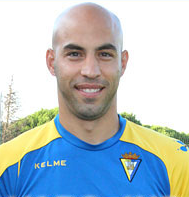
- Álvaro Jurado player of Cádiz CF, 2010

Personal information
- Full name: Álvaro Jurado Espinosa
- Date of birth: 5 September 1981 (age 45)
- Place of birth: Córdoba, Spain
- Height: 1.84 m (6 ft 0 in)
- Position: Midfielder

Youth career
- Sevilla

Senior career*
Years	Team	Apps	(Gls)
2001–2005	Sevilla B	85	(1)
2002–2003	Sevilla	1	(0)
2002–2003	→ Getafe (loan)	16	(0)
2005–2007	Lorca Deportiva	52	(1)
2007–2010	Salamanca	66	(2)
2010–2011	Cádiz	36	(1)
2012–2013	Piast Gliwice	17	(0)
2013–2014	Alcalá	11	(1)
Total		284	(6)

International career
1998	Spain U16	3	(0)
- * Club domestic league appearances and goals

Álvaro Jurado Espinosa (born 5 September 1981) is a Spanish former professional footballer who played as a defensive midfielder.

== Honours ==
Piast Gliwice

- I liga: 2011–12
