= Marc Fachan =

French footballer (born 1989)

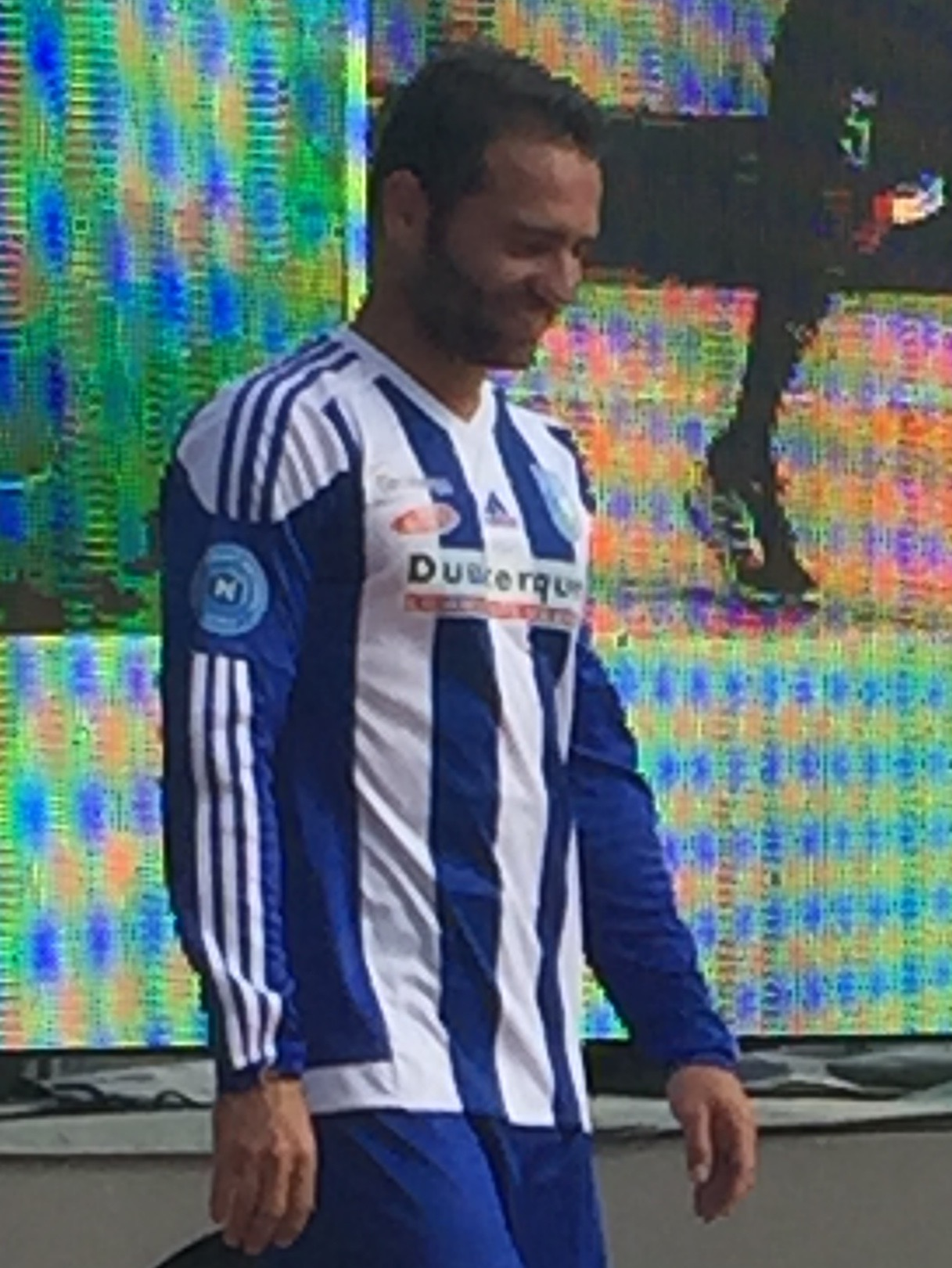
- Fachan in 2016

Personal information
- Full name: Marc Christophe Fachan
- Date of birth: 25 January 1989 (age 37)
- Place of birth: Tarbes, France
- Height: 1.81 m (5 ft 11 in)
- Position: Right back

Youth career
- 1995–2002: Castelmaurou
- 2002–2004: AS Villeneuve
- 2004–2006: Tarbes-Pyrénées
- 2007–2008: Auxerre

Senior career*
Years	Team	Apps	(Gls)
2006–2007	Tarbes-Pyrénées	17	(0)
2007–2009	Auxerre B	47	(0)
2009	Dynamo Kyiv	0	(0)
2009–2011	Gimnàstic	23	(0)
2011–2012	Alavés	12	(0)
2012–2014	Carquefou	48	(2)
2014–2015	Strasbourg	12	(1)
2015–2018	Dunkerque	73	(10)
2018–2020	Fréjus Saint-Raphaël	9	(0)
2020–2021	Bergerac Périgord	0	(0)
2021–2023	Genêts Anglet	0	(0)

International career
2008	France U19	5	(0)

Managerial career
- 2023–: Tarbes Pyrénées Football
- * Club domestic league appearances and goals as of 19:00, 1 May 2020 (UTC)

Marc Christophe Fachan (born 25 January 1989) is a French footballer who plays for Bergerac Périgord FC as a right back.

== Club career ==
Born in Tarbes, Hautes-Pyrénées, Fachan began his career at the age of six at F.C. Castelmaurou, joining AS Villeneuve in Haute-Garonne seven years later. In 2004, he moved to Tarbes Pyrénées Football where his father Jean-Louis coached, to complete his formation.

In summer 2007, Fachan signed with Ligue 1 club AJ Auxerre, playing almost exclusively with its reserves. Two years later he was released and left for Ukraine, joining FC Dynamo Kyiv. On 26 July 2009, he left the team, however, returning immediately to his homeland.

In late August 2009, Fachan moved to Gimnàstic de Tarragona in Spain. He made his Segunda División debut on 12 September against Real Sociedad, replacing veteran Mingo for the second half of a 1–2 home defeat.

Fachan did not appear in any league games in the 2010–11 season. On 10 August 2011, Nàstic and the player mutually agreed to terminate his contract and, shortly after, he signed with another side in the country, Segunda División B's Deportivo Alavés.

Fachan returned to France subsequently, where he represented, always in the Championnat National, USJA Carquefou, RC Strasbourg and USL Dunkerque. He scored a career-best seven goals for the latter club during 2017–18, mostly from penalties. On 28 October 2017, during a match against Rodez AF, he was involved in a fight with teammate Cédric Tuta as both wished to hit from the 11-meter mark; the latter, who eventually scored in the 1–3 home loss, was cut from the squad shortly after, and Fachan himself left them at the end of the campaign.

In September 2018, Fachan joined Étoile Fréjus Saint-Raphaël of the Championnat National 2. Towards the end of the 2020 January transfer window, he moved to fellow league club Bergerac Périgord FC.

== International career ==
Fachan was first selected for France's under-19 team in December 2008, appearing on the 12th against Italy at Rende.
