= Rubén Durán =

Spanish footballer

Personal information
- Full name: Rubén Rodríguez Durán
- Date of birth: 29 September 1983 (age 43)
- Place of birth: Vigo, Spain
- Height: 1.72 m (5 ft 7 1/2 in)
- Position: Forward

Team information
- Current team: Ourense

Senior career*
Years	Team	Apps	(Gls)
2002–2003	Rápido Bouzas		
2003–2006	CD Ourense	93	(16)
2006–2007	Zamora	17	(0)
2007–2009	Lugo	68	(21)
2009–2011	Real Unión	55	(7)
2011–2012	Logroñés	33	(4)
2012–2013	Lugo	27	(2)
2013–2015	Racing Santander	45	(3)
2015–2016	Marbella	22	(4)
2016–2021	UD Ourense		
2021–2022	Barbadás		
- * Club domestic league appearances and goals

Rubén Rodríguez Durán (born 29 September 1983) is a Spanish former professional footballer who played as a forward.
