= Cristian García (Spanish footballer) =

Spanish footballer (born 1981)

Cristian
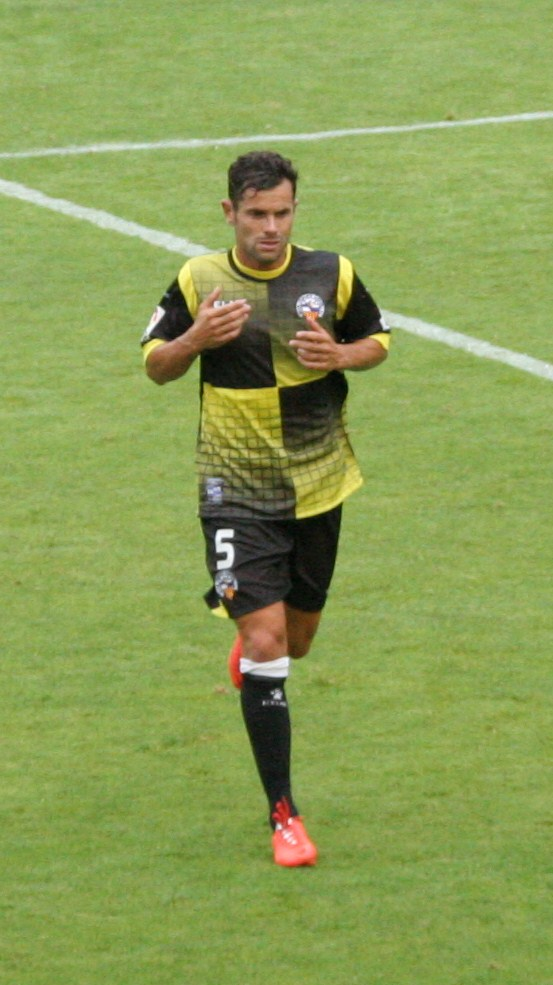
- Cristian as a Sabadell player (2014)

Personal information
- Full name: Cristian García Ramos
- Date of birth: 21 December 1981 (age 44)
- Place of birth: Terrassa, Spain
- Height: 1.69 m (5 ft 7 in)
- Position: Right-back

Team information
- Current team: San Cristóbal (manager)

Youth career
- Terrassa

Senior career*
Years	Team	Apps	(Gls)
1999–2005	Terrassa	165	(6)
2005–2007	Poli Ejido	77	(2)
2007–2010	Cádiz	109	(6)
2010–2011	Ponferradina	36	(0)
2011–2013	Córdoba	26	(2)
2013–2015	Sabadell	72	(5)
2015–2016	Tenerife	20	(0)
2016–2017	Terrassa	13	(0)
Total		518	(21)

Managerial career
- 2017–2019: Terrassa
- 2021: Sant Andreu
- 2021–2022: Hospitalet
- 2022–2023: Vilafranca
- 2023–: San Cristóbal
- * Club domestic league appearances and goals

Cristian García Ramos (born 21 December 1981), known simply as Cristian, is a Spanish former professional footballer who played as a right-back. He is the manager of Tercera Federación club San Cristóbal.

His career was mainly associated to Terrassa, as both a player and a manager. He played 390 games in the Segunda División over 13 seasons, scoring a total of 17 goals for seven clubs.

== Playing career ==
Born in Terrassa, Barcelona, Catalonia, Cristian began playing with local Terrassa FC's first team at the age of 18. In the 2001–02 season, he contributed 33 appearances as the club returned to Segunda División after 23 years.

Cristian played his first match as a professional on 31 August 2002, starting in a 1–1 home draw against Albacete Balompié. He scored his first league goal the following 7 June, helping to a 2–2 away draw with Elche CF. Also during that campaign, he found the net in a 4–2 loss at Real Madrid in the Copa del Rey.

In 2005, following Terrassa's relegation, Cristian signed with Polideportivo Ejido also in the second division. In his second year in Andalusia, he only missed one game in 42 as his team finished in 11th position.

Cristian joined Cádiz CF for 2007–08, being relegated but managing to promote from Segunda División B the following year. In the 2009–10 season, with 37 matches and two goals from the player, they again dropped down a level.

In the following six years, Cristian continued competing in division two, with SD Ponferradina, Córdoba CF, CE Sabadell FC and CD Tenerife. He was relegated with the first club in his only season, and the third in 2015. Whilst at the service of Córdoba, he suffered a severe anterior cruciate ligament injury which sidelined him for nearly one year.

On 6 July 2016, the 34-year-old Cristian returned to Terrassa, now in the Tercera División.

== Coaching career ==
On 31 May 2017, former Terrassa player and director of football Cristian retired for good from football and was immediately appointed the manager of the first team, still in the fourth tier. In May 2019, he left.
