= Mikel González =

Spanish footballer (born 1985)

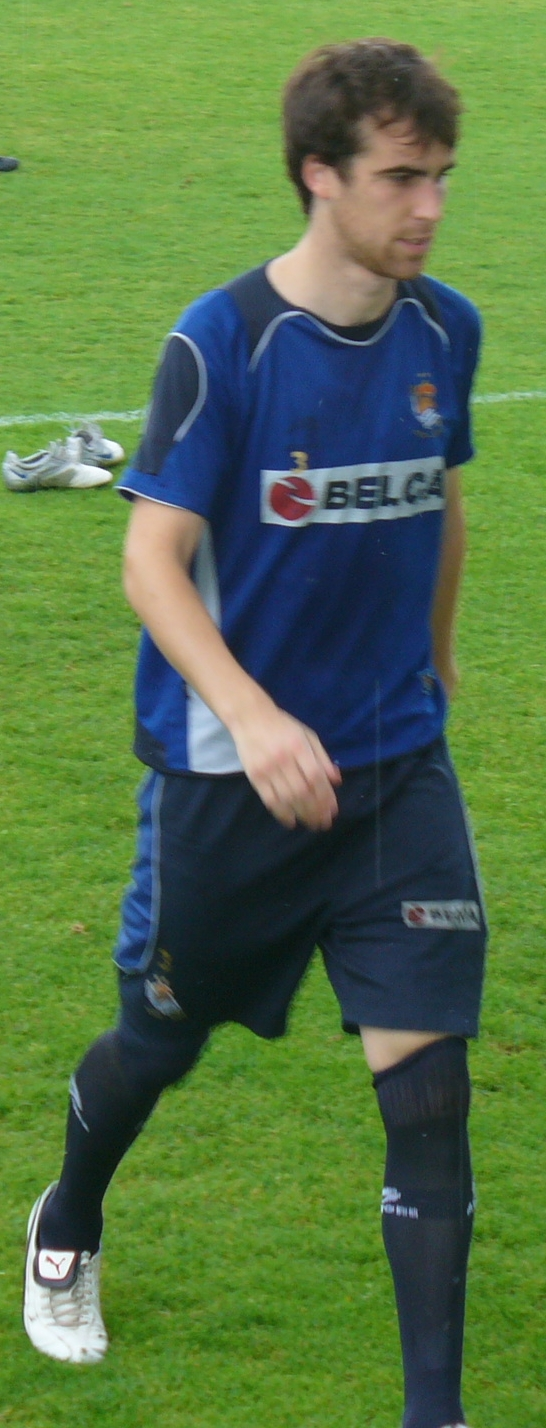
- González training with Real Sociedad (2010)

Personal information
- Full name: Mikel González de Martín Martínez
- Date of birth: 24 September 1985 (age 41)
- Place of birth: Mondragón, Spain
- Height: 1.88 m (6 ft 2 in)
- Position: Centre-back

Youth career
- Real Sociedad

Senior career*
Years	Team	Apps	(Gls)
2004–2006	Real Sociedad B	55	(0)
2005–2017	Real Sociedad	282	(4)
2017–2018	Zaragoza	27	(1)
2018–2023	AEK Larnaca	111	(3)
Total		475	(8)

International career
2007–2016	Basque Country	7	(0)
- * Club domestic league appearances and goals

Mikel González de Martín Martínez (born 24 September 1985) is a Spanish former professional footballer who played as a central defender.

He spent most of his 19-year senior career with Real Sociedad, playing 300 competitive games and scoring six goals.

== Club career ==
=== Real Sociedad ===
A product of Real Sociedad's youth ranks, González was born in Arrasate-Mondragón, Gipuzkoa, and he made his first-team debut on 17 September 2005 in a 5–2 away loss against Mallorca. He went on to collect only two more La Liga appearances during that season.

With the Basque team in the Segunda División, González became an undisputed starter, appearing in 35 games in 2009–10 as Real returned to the top flight after a three-year absence and contributing one goal, in a 2–1 home victory over Villarreal B. He added 32 matches – 30 starts – the next campaign as the club retained its league status, but somewhat lost his importance in the squad following the January 2011 signing of Norwegian Vadim Demidov and the emergence of youth product Iñigo Martínez.

González returned to starting duties in the following seasons, alongside Martínez: he started in all his 34 league appearances in 2012–13 in more than 3.000 minutes of action, scoring against Rayo Vallecano (4–0, at home) and Valencia (5–2 away win) as the Txuriurdin finished fourth and returned to the UEFA Champions League after one decade.

González made his debut in the Champions League on 17 September 2013, playing the full 90 minutes in a 0–2 group phase home loss to Shakhtar Donetsk. He added a further four games in that stage of the competition, as his team ranked last.

In April 2017, by now a backup member of the squad, González made his 300th appearance for Real Sociedad. It was his final match serving the club, with his contract not renewed on its expiry the following month.

=== Zaragoza ===
On 29 August 2017, free agent González signed a two-year deal with Real Zaragoza in the second division. He scored his only goal for the Aragonese – play-offs notwithstanding– on 2 October, helping the visitors to draw 2–2 at Real Oviedo.

González terminated his contract on 8 July 2018.

=== AEK Larnaca ===
On 3 July 2018, the 32-year-old González moved abroad for the first time in his career and joined Cypriot First Division club AEK Larnaca on a one-year contract. He retired in May 2023.

== Honours ==
Real Sociedad

- Segunda División: 2009–10

AEK Larnaca

- Cypriot Super Cup: 2018
