= Franck Songo'o =

Cameroonian footballer (born 1987)

Personal information
- Full name: Franck Steve Bangweni Songo'o
- Date of birth: 14 May 1987 (age 39)
- Place of birth: Yaoundé, Cameroon
- Height: 1.78 m (5 ft 10 in)
- Position: Winger

Youth career
- –2002: Deportivo La Coruña
- 2002–2005: Barcelona

Senior career*
Years	Team	Apps	(Gls)
2005	Barcelona C	1	(0)
2005–2008	Portsmouth	3	(0)
2006	→ Bournemouth (loan)	4	(0)
2007	→ Preston North End (loan)	6	(0)
2007	→ Crystal Palace (loan)	9	(0)
2008	→ Sheffield Wednesday (loan)	12	(1)
2008–2010	Zaragoza	31	(1)
2010	→ Real Sociedad (loan)	8	(0)
2010–2011	Albacete	6	(0)
2012	Portland Timbers	27	(1)
2013–2014	Glyfada	10	(0)
2014	PAS Giannina	4	(0)
Total		121	(3)

International career
2006	France U19	2	(0)
2008	Cameroon U23	4	(0)
2008–2012	Cameroon	3	(0)
- * Club domestic league appearances and goals

Franck Steve Bangweni Songo'o (born 14 May 1987) is a Cameroonian former professional footballer who played as either a forward or midfielder. His senior career had been spent primarily in the English and Spanish football league systems, and has also been capped for the Cameroon national team.

== Club career ==
=== Early career ===
Born in the Cameroonian capital, Yaoundé, Songo'o began his youth footballing career at Spanish club Deportivo de La Coruña. Franck's father, Jacques, played for Deportivo's senior club and was part of the squad that won the 1999–2000 La Liga championship. At Deportivo, Franck was spotted by Spanish club FC Barcelona. He spent several years at Barcelona's youth facility centre, La Masia, alongside future stars Lionel Messi, Cesc Fàbregas, and Gerard Piqué. Although Songo'o did not make an immediate impact on Barça's first team, he impressed other clubs, drawing interest from the Premier League.

=== Portsmouth ===
On 31 August 2005, Songo'o signed for Portsmouth for a fee of £250,000. He made two appearances for Portsmouth in the 2005–2006 season. After several loan spells, on 13 January 2008, he made his third and final Premier League appearance for Portsmouth as a second-half substitute for Arnold Mvuemba against Sunderland while a number of Portsmouth's first eleven were away at the African Cup of Nations in Ghana. He was then loaned out again to Sheffield Wednesday and left England at the end of the season.

==== Loan spells ====
On 20 October 2006, Songo'o joined League 1 side Bournemouth on a one-month loan but failed to make an impact. On 8 March 2007, he signed with Championship club Preston North End on loan until the end of the season.

He became Neil Warnock's first signing at Crystal Palace at the end of October 2007, returning to Portsmouth in the new year.

On 7 March 2008, Songo'o joined Championship side Sheffield Wednesday on an initial one-month loan deal from his parent club. Whilst making his debut for Sheffield Wednesday he showed his wealth of trickery as he performed the rainbow kick skill to bypass two QPR defenders in the last minute of the game. He scored his first goal in English football for Wednesday, scoring a late equaliser against Stoke City.

=== Spain ===
In the summer of 2008, Songo'o joined Spanish side Real Zaragoza, where he was given the number 11 shirt. Zaragoza played well in the 2008–09 Segunda División and were promoted to La Liga. Songo'o played limited minutes for Zaragoza in the top flight and was loaned to Segunda División side Real Sociedad.

On 6 September 2010, Zaragoza terminated Songo'o's contract. He then signed for another Segunda División club, Albacete. Songo'o only made six first-team appearances for Albacete, and when the club was relegated at the end of the 2011 season, he was released.

=== Portland Timbers ===
In January and February 2012, Songo'o practiced and played as a trialist with the Portland Timbers of Major League Soccer. After assisting on four goals in four preseason games, Songo'o was signed to a contract by the Timbers on 16 February 2012. Songo'o was waived by Portland on 27 February 2013.

=== Greece ===
After a short spell with Glyfada in the Football League South, Songo'o signed for Super League outfit PAS Giannina on 1 January 2014.

== International career ==
=== France U-19 ===
Although he was born in Cameroon, he has represented the French under-19 international team.

=== Cameroon national team ===
In 2008 Songo'o applied to FIFA for a change in nationality to allow him to play in the 2008 Beijing Olympics. The request was granted, and Songo'o was named in the Cameroon national squad for the games. He earned his first cap for Cameroon in the 2010 World Cup Qualifiers match against Cape Verde on 6 September 2008.

In November 2012, Songo'o was called up for the first time in four years. He came on as a second-half substitute in a friendly against Albania on 14 November 2012.

== Personal life ==
The Songo'o family has raised many footballers. Franck is the son of former Cameroonian national team goalkeeper Jacques Songo'o, who featured for Spanish side Deportivo La Coruña in the late 1990s and early 2000s. His brother, Yann Songo'o, was formerly on the books of Blackburn Rovers. Near the end of his playing career it was reported that Franck Songo'o was becoming involved with several businesses in A Coruña owned by his father.
