= Mikel Labaka =

Spanish footballer

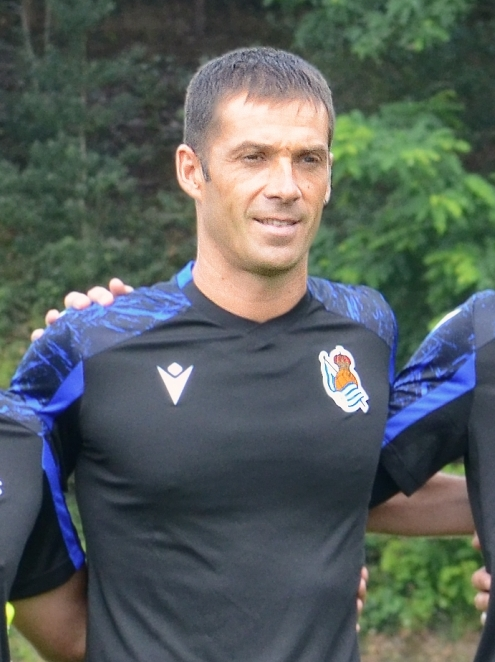
- Labaka with Real Sociedad in 2021

Personal information
- Full name: Mikel Labaka Zurriarain
- Date of birth: 10 August 1980 (age 46)
- Place of birth: Azpeitia, Spain
- Height: 1.85 m (6 ft 1 in)
- Position: Centre-back

Team information
- Current team: Real Sociedad (assistant)

Youth career
- 1996–1997: Lagun Onak
- 1997–1999: Real Sociedad

Senior career*
Years	Team	Apps	(Gls)
1999–2002	Real Sociedad B	106	(8)
2002–2011	Real Sociedad	173	(10)
2002–2003	→ Real Unión (loan)	35	(1)
2003–2004	→ Ciudad Murcia (loan)	26	(2)
2011–2013	Rayo Vallecano	23	(1)
Total		363	(22)

International career
2005–2012	Basque Country	8	(1)

Managerial career
- 2014–2016: Real Sociedad B (assistant)
- 2016–: Real Sociedad (assistant)
- * Club domestic league appearances and goals

Mikel Labaka Zurriarain (born 10 August 1980) is a Spanish former professional footballer who played as a central defender. He is currently assistant manager of Real Sociedad.

He totalled 111 La Liga matches and five goals over six seasons, representing Real Sociedad and Rayo Vallecano. He added 111 games and eight goals in the Segunda División, in a 14-year career.

== Playing career ==
Born in Azpeitia, Basque Country, Labaka reached Real Sociedad's youth system at the age of 17. After playing three years with the reserves he made his professional debut with Real Unión (Segunda División B) and Ciudad de Murcia (Segunda División), spending one season with each club on loan.

On 24 October 2004, Labaka made his first-team – and La Liga – debut with Real Sociedad, in a 2–1 home win against RCD Mallorca, and finished his first season with 30 games and three goals to help the Txuriurdin to finish in 14th position. He only appeared in 11 league matches in 2006–07 as they suffered relegation for the first time in 40 years, but regained first-choice status the following campaigns.

In August 2011, the 31-year-old Labaka was deemed surplus to requirements by new manager Philippe Montanier, and left Real to sign for Rayo Vallecano, recently promoted to the top tier. He retired in June 2013, after two seasons as a backup.

== Coaching career ==
Labaka was named assistant coach at his main club Real Sociedad on 7 June 2016, after nearly two years in the same capacity with the B side. He remained in the position for more than a decade, working under several managers.
