= Markel Bergara =

Spanish footballer (born 1986)

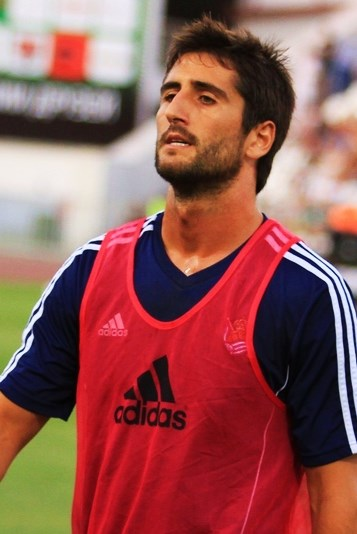
- Bergara with Real Sociedad in 2014

Personal information
- Full name: Markel Bergara Larrañaga
- Date of birth: 5 May 1986 (age 40)
- Place of birth: Elgoibar, Spain
- Height: 1.80 m (5 ft 11 in)
- Position: Defensive midfielder

Youth career
- Real Sociedad

Senior career*
Years	Team	Apps	(Gls)
2003–2005	Real Sociedad B	55	(0)
2005–2018	Real Sociedad	195	(3)
2005–2006	→ Eibar (loan)	25	(0)
2006–2007	→ Vecindario (loan)	18	(0)
2017–2018	→ Getafe (loan)	18	(4)
2018–2020	Getafe	5	(0)
Total		316	(7)

International career
2002	Spain U16	3	(0)
2002–2003	Spain U17	16	(0)
2004–2005	Spain U19	16	(0)
2005	Spain U20	5	(0)
Medal record
Representing Spain
Men's football
FIFA U-17 World Cup
Runner-up	2003 Finland
UEFA European Under-17 Championship
Runner-up	2003 Portugal
- * Club domestic league appearances and goals

Markel Bergara Larrañaga (born 5 May 1986) is a Spanish former professional footballer who played as a defensive midfielder.

He spent the better part of his career with Real Sociedad, appearing in 212 competitive matches and scoring four goals. In La Liga, he also represented Getafe.

== Club career ==
=== Real Sociedad ===
Bergara was born in Elgoibar, Gipuzkoa. A Real Sociedad youth graduate, he started his career on loan, having season-long spells in the Segunda División with SD Eibar and UD Vecindario, both ended in relegation.

On 4 September 2007, Bergara made his first-team debut, appearing in a 1–0 away defeat against UD Las Palmas in the second round of the Copa del Rey. He only played four times in the league in his first year, also in the second tier.

Bergara appeared in 19 games in 2009–10 as the Basques returned to La Liga after a three-year absence, as champions. He made his debut in the competition on 13 September 2010, in a 2–2 away draw against UD Almería (three minutes played). He finished the campaign with the same number of appearances as the club retained its league status, albeit in more minutes.

In 2012–13, Bergara contributed 28 matches as Real finished fourth and returned to the UEFA Champions League after more than a decade. He scored his first goal as a professional on 24 March 2014, but in a 4–3 loss at Almería.

Bergara missed the vast majority of the 2016–17 season, due to an ankle injury.

=== Getafe ===
On 18 July 2017, Bergara was loaned to fellow top-flight side Getafe CF for one year. He managed to score four times in his first 14 appearances, but in December he suffered another serious physical ailment, this time in the knee.

Bergara signed a permanent contract on 27 June 2018. In January 2020, not being able to overcome his injury problems, he announced his retirement at the age of 33.

== Honours ==
Real Sociedad

- Segunda División: 2009–10

Spain U19

- UEFA European Under-19 Championship: 2004
