= Jonathan Estrada (footballer, born 1983) =

Colombian footballer

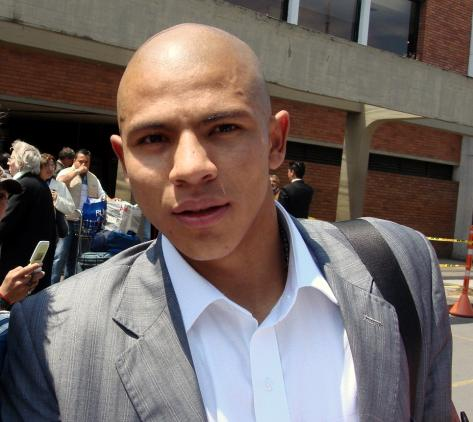
- Estrada as a Millonarios player in 2007

Personal information
- Full name: Jonathan Estrada Campillo
- Date of birth: 27 January 1983 (age 43)
- Place of birth: Medellín, Colombia
- Height: 1.82 m (6 ft 0 in)
- Position: Midfielder

Senior career*
Years	Team	Apps	(Gls)
2001–2006	Envigado	135	(34)
2007–2010	Millonarios	99	(7)
2009–2010	→ Real Sociedad (loan)	11	(0)
2011	Avaí	11	(0)
2012	Independiente Medellín	14	(2)
2013–2014	Patriotas	62	(7)
2015	Deportes Tolima	34	(5)
2016	Millonarios	36	(5)
2017	Atlético Junior	9	(0)
2017–2018	Atlético Bucaramanga	10	(0)
2019	Envigado	5	(0)

International career
2007	Colombia	1	(0)
- * Club domestic league appearances and goals

Jonathan Estrada Campillo (born 27 January 1983) is a Colombian former professional footballer who played as a midfielder.

== Club career ==
Born in Medellín, Antioquia Department, Estrada made his professional debut aged 18, with Envigado Fútbol Club, being an automatic first-choice from an early age. His first game came on 5 August 2001 in a 4–1 away win against Once Caldas, where he also scored.

In January 2007, Estrada moved to Millonarios F.C. of Bogotá. In that year's Copa Sudamericana, he helped with two goals from ten appearances to an eventual last-four finish.

In June 2009, Estrada signed a one-year loan with Spain's Real Sociedad, which was managed by former Millonarios coach Martín Lasarte. During the season, as the club returned to La Liga after a three-year absence, he played less than one third of the matches, and subsequently returned to Millonarios.

Estrada moved abroad again on 7 January 2011, joining Avaí Futebol Clube in Brazil.

== International career ==
Estrada played with Colombia at under-17, under-20 and under-23 levels. He was called to the full squad for the first time in 2007, playing the entire 4–0 friendly away win over Panama on 9 May.

== Career statistics ==
As of 14 November 2010

Appearances and goals by club, season and competition
Club	Season	League			National cup		Total	
Club	Season	Division	Apps	Goals	Apps	Goals	Apps	Goals
Millonarios	2007		34	1	0	0	34	1
Millonarios	2008		34	6	1	0	35	6
Millonarios	2009		14	0	2	0	16	0
Millonarios	2010		17	0	7	6	24	6
Millonarios	Total		99	7	10	6	109	13
