= Sergio Rodríguez (footballer, born 1978) =

Spanish footballer and manager

Personal information
- Full name: Sergio Rodríguez Martínez
- Date of birth: 26 July 1978 (age 48)
- Place of birth: Logroño, Spain
- Height: 1.75 m (5 ft 9 in)
- Position: Central midfielder

Youth career
- La Unión
- Cantabria

Senior career*
Years	Team	Apps	(Gls)
- Peña RM Logroño
- Loyola
1999–2000	CD Logroñés B		
2000–2001	Balaguer		
2001–2006	Lleida	163	(20)
2006–2007	Cádiz	12	(0)
2007	→ Lleida (loan)	17	(2)
2007–2008	Alavés	38	(4)
2008–2010	Real Sociedad	39	(3)
2010–2013	UD Logroñés	63	(9)
Total		332+	(38+)

Managerial career
- 2013–2017: UD Logroñés (youth)
- 2016: UD Logroñés (caretaker)
- 2017: UD Logroñés (caretaker)
- 2017–2021: UD Logroñés
- 2023: UD Logroñés
- 2024–2025: UD Logroñés
- * Club domestic league appearances and goals

Sergio Rodríguez Martínez (born 26 July 1978) is a Spanish former professional footballer who played as a central midfielder, currently a manager.

In a 14-year senior career, he amassed Segunda División totals of 159 matches and 16 goals over six seasons, representing in the competition Lleida, Cádiz, Alavés and Real Sociedad.

Rodríguez started working as a coach in 2017, spending four full seasons at the helm of UD Logroñés as well as parts of three others.

== Playing career ==
Born in Logroño, La Rioja, Rodríguez began playing football with SRC La Unión, but was unable to appear for the club due to his age. Following a period at SR Cantabria, he started his senior career with Peña Real Madrid de Logroño, and went on to represent SD Loyola and CD Logroñés B.

In 2001, after one year at Tercera División side CF Balaguer, Rodríguez joined UE Lleida where he made his professional debut, representing the Catalans in both the Segunda División and Segunda División B. In the 2006–07 season he signed with Cádiz CF in the former level but, unsettled, left a few months later and moved back to Lleida on loan, in the third tier.

Rodríguez continued in division two the following years, with Deportivo Alavés and Real Sociedad. Already a fringe player in his second campaign with the latter, he did appear in 15 games as they returned to La Liga after a three-year absence, being subsequently released.

== Coaching career ==
After retiring at the age of 35, Rodríguez starting working as a coach with his last club, being in charge of the youth sides at UD Logroñés. On 17 November 2016, after Carlos Pouso was fired from the first team in the third division, he was appointed as caretaker. He once again came to the rescue of the latter on 20 March 2017, signing until the end of the season following the dismissal of Rafael Berges.

On 8 May 2017, Rodríguez agreed to a two-year permanent deal at Logroñés. He led them to a first-ever promotion to the second division in 2020, and renewed his contract for a further season on 24 July.

Rodríguez left the Estadio Las Gaunas on 31 May 2021, after the club's immediate relegation. He was one of three managers during the 2022–23 campaign, not being able to avoid a drop from Primera Federación.

On 24 November 2024, Rodríguez went again from Logroñés' front office to their bench, taking over from the dismissed Miguel Flaño. The following 5 March, he stepped down again.

== Managerial statistics ==
As of 2 March 2025

Managerial record by team and tenure
Team	From	To	Record								Ref
Team	From	To	G	W	D	L	GF	GA	GD	Win %	Ref
UD Logroñés (caretaker)	17 November 2016	28 November 2016	2	1	1	0	4	0	+4	50.00	
UD Logroñés (caretaker)	20 March 2017	14 May 2017	8	7	0	1	19	3	+16	87.50	
UD Logroñés	1 July 2017	31 May 2021	161	70	47	44	195	147	+48	43.48	
UD Logroñés	28 February 2023	6 July 2023	14	3	5	6	6	9	−3	21.43	
UD Logroñés	24 November 2024	5 March 2025	14	4	8	2	17	7	+10	28.57	
Total			199	85	61	53	241	166	+75	42.71	—

== Honours ==
=== Player ===
Lleida

- Segunda División B: 2003–04

Real Sociedad

- Segunda División: 2009–10
