= Dani Estrada =

Spanish footballer (born 1987)

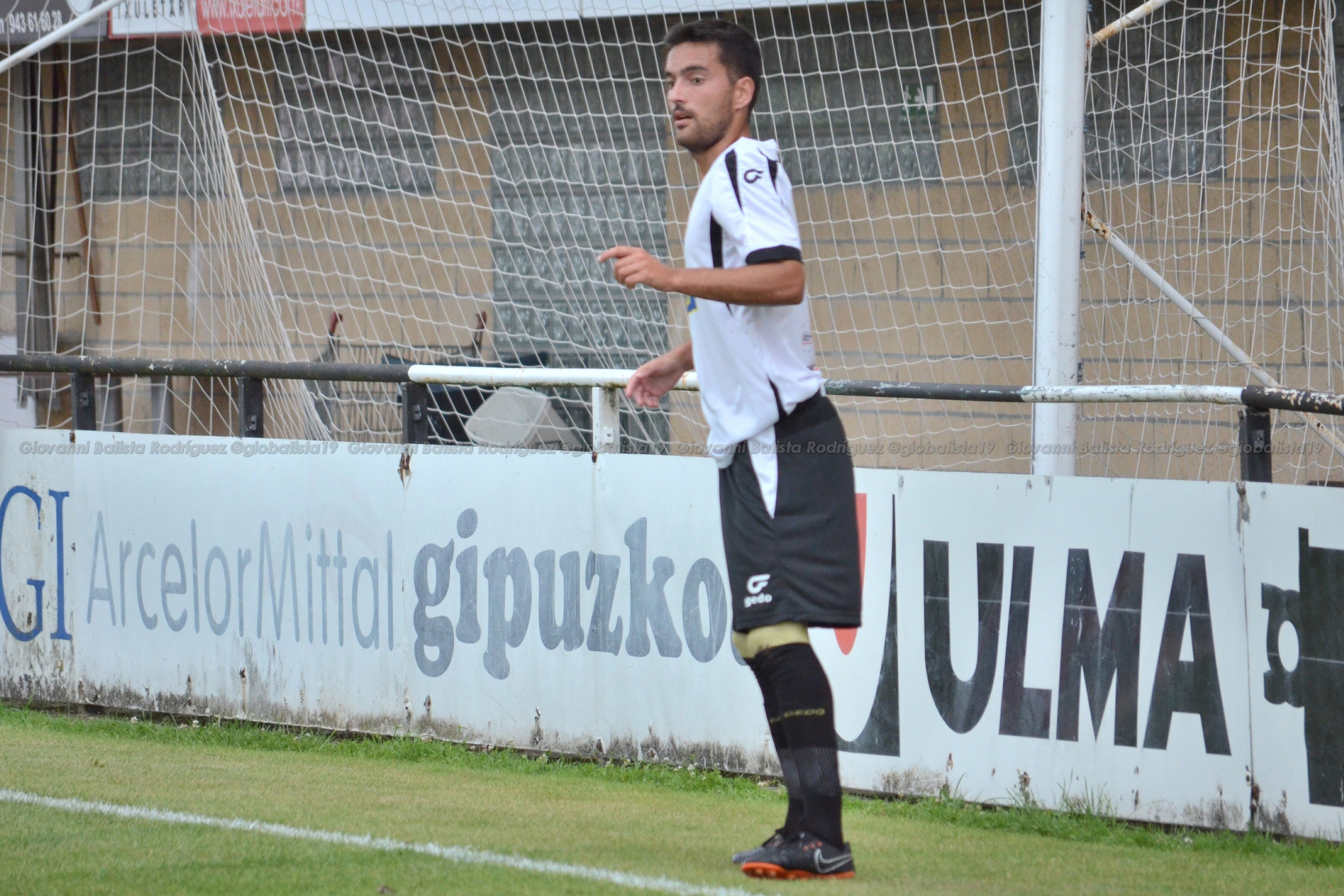
- Estrada in action for Real Unión in 2018

Personal information
- Full name: Daniel Estrada Agirrezabalaga
- Date of birth: 3 January 1987 (age 39)
- Place of birth: Zarautz, Spain
- Height: 1.77 m (5 ft 10 in)
- Positions: Midfielder; full-back

Youth career
- 2001–2005: Real Sociedad

Senior career*
| Years | Team | Apps | (Gls) |
| 2005–2007 | Real Sociedad B | 64 | (15) |
| 2007–2015 | Real Sociedad | 139 | (3) |
| 2015–2016 | Alavés | 19 | (1) |
| 2017–2020 | Real Unión | 116 | (9) |
| 2020–2021 | Barakaldo | 25 | (1) |
| Total | | 363 | (29) |
- * Club domestic league appearances and goals

Daniel 'Dani' Estrada Agirrezabalaga (born 3 January 1987) is a Spanish former professional footballer who played mainly as a right midfielder.

He spent the better part of his career with Real Sociedad, appearing in 153 competitive matches and spending six seasons in La Liga with the club.

== Career ==
A product of Basque Country giants Real Sociedad's youth system, Estrada was born in Zarautz, Gipuzkoa, and he spent his first two senior seasons with the reserves in the Segunda División B. In 2006–07, he finished second in Group II in scoring, netting a career-best 13 goals.

Estrada made his debut with the first team on 10 February 2007, playing five minutes in a 2–1 home loss against Real Madrid. Three months later, in his third La Liga appearance, he was also brought from the bench against FC Barcelona (2–0 defeat, also at home), and finished his first year with eight games in an eventual relegation.

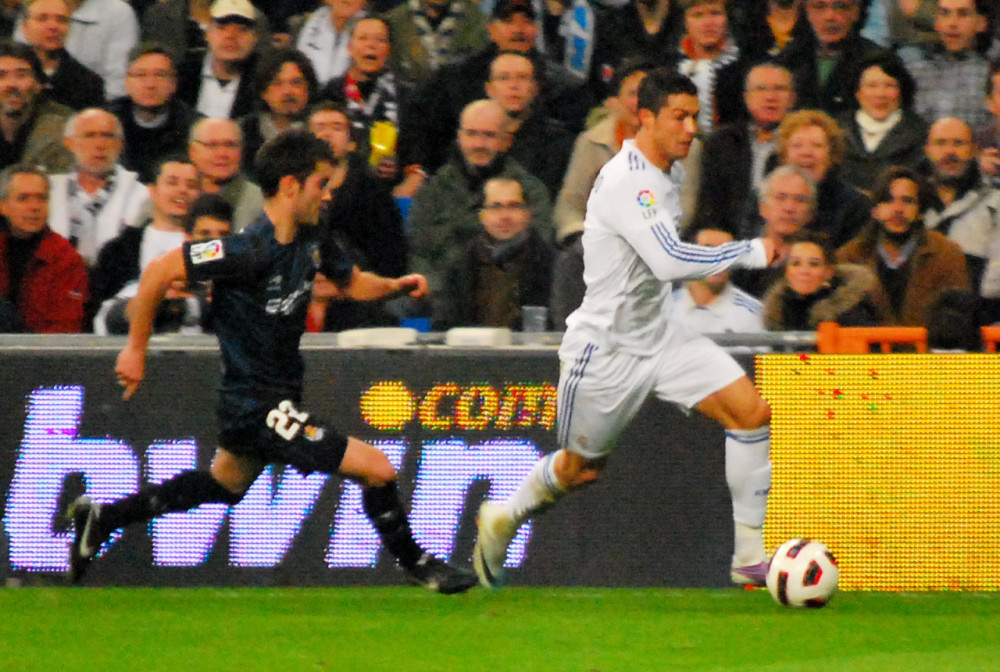
Estrada (left) with Real Sociedad in 2011

In the following two Segunda División campaigns, Estrada was irregularly put to use at Real Sociedad, as they consecutively failed to regain their top-flight status. In 2009–10, the club returned to the latter competition after a three-year absence, and he contributed 18 matches and 1,538 minutes.

After being reconverted by manager Martín Lasarte the previous year, Estrada was exclusively deployed as a full-back in 2010–11. He scored his first goal for the first team on 26 February 2011, but also put one in his own net in a 4–1 loss at RCD Espanyol.

In late May 2014, Estrada renewed his contract with Real Sociedad until 2015. On 6 July of the following year, he signed a one-year deal with Deportivo Alavés after his link expired.

Estrada retired in 2021 aged 34, following spells in the third tier at Real Unión and Barakaldo CF.

== Honours ==
Real Sociedad

- Segunda División: 2009–10

Alavés

- Segunda División: 2015–16
