= Iñigo Sarasola =

Spanish footballer (born 1987)

Íñigo Sarasola
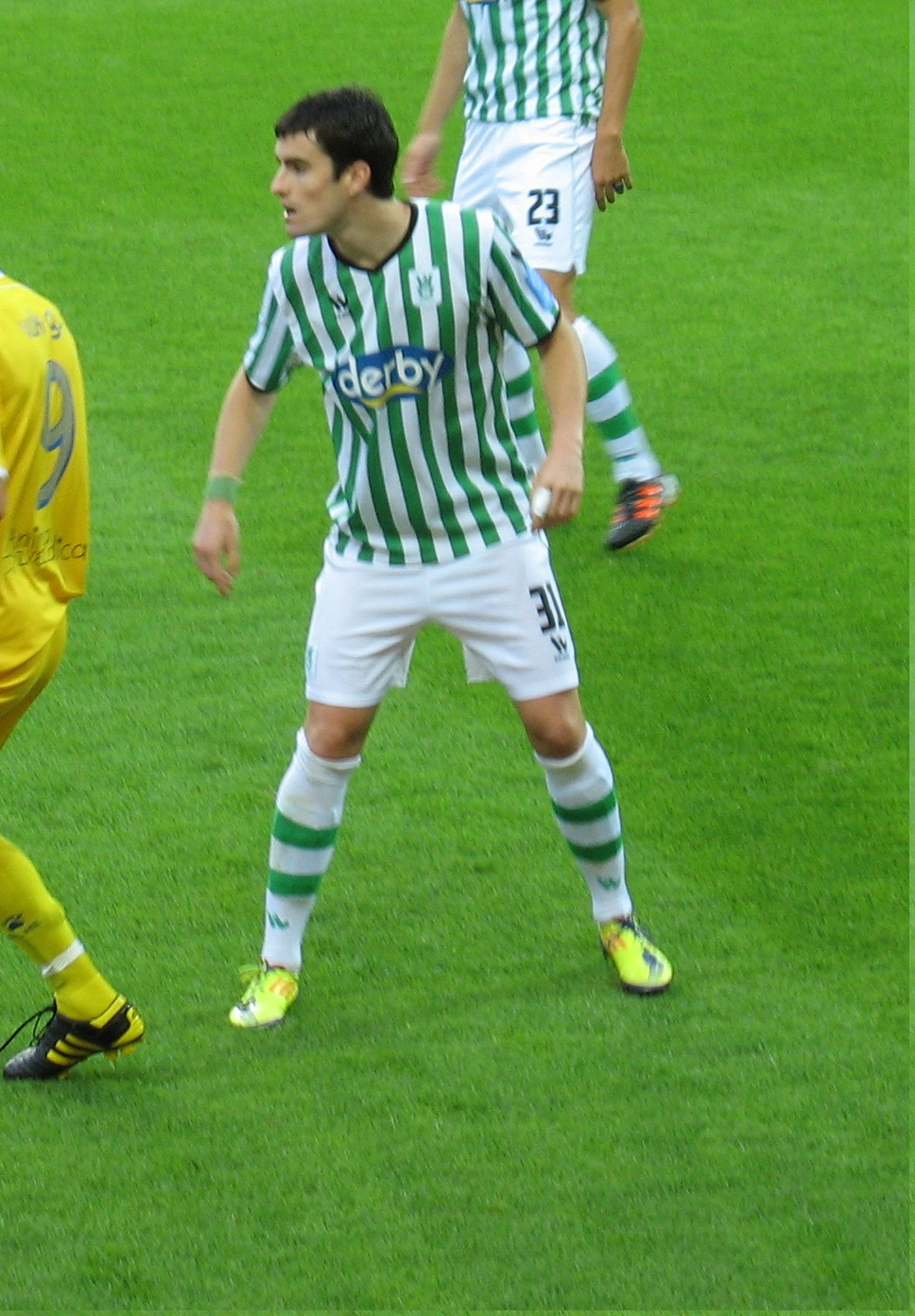
- Sarasola with Olimpija Ljubljana

Personal information
- Full name: Iñigo Sarasola Laskurain
- Date of birth: 10 June 1987 (age 39)
- Place of birth: Villabona, Spain
- Height: 1.81 m (5 ft 11 in)
- Position: Full-back

Youth career
- Billabona
- Real Sociedad

Senior career*
Years	Team	Apps	(Gls)
2006–2009	Real Sociedad B	68	(2)
2007–2011	Real Sociedad	6	(0)
2010–2011	→ Real Unión (loan)	14	(1)
2011–2012	SD Beasain		
2012	Olimpija Ljubljana	9	(0)
- * Club domestic league appearances and goals as of 16:55, 7 November 2012 (UTC)

Íñigo Sarasola Laskurain (born 10 June 1987) is a Spanish former professional footballer who played as a full-back.

On 2 July 2012, he signed a 1.5-year contract with Olimpija Ljubljana.
