= Anoeta =

Human settlement in Tolosaldea, Gipuzkoa, Basque Country, Spain

Coordinates: 43°9′44″N 2°4′12″W

- Coat of arms

- Location in Spain.
- Country: Spain
- Autonomous community: Gipuzkoa

Area
  - Total: 4.14 km^{2} (1.60 sq mi)
- Elevation: 77 m (253 ft)

Population (2025-01-01)
  - Total: 2,112
  - Density: 510/km^{2} (1,320/sq mi)
- Time zone: UTC+1 (CET)
  - Summer (DST): UTC+2 (CEST)
- Website: www.anoeta.eus

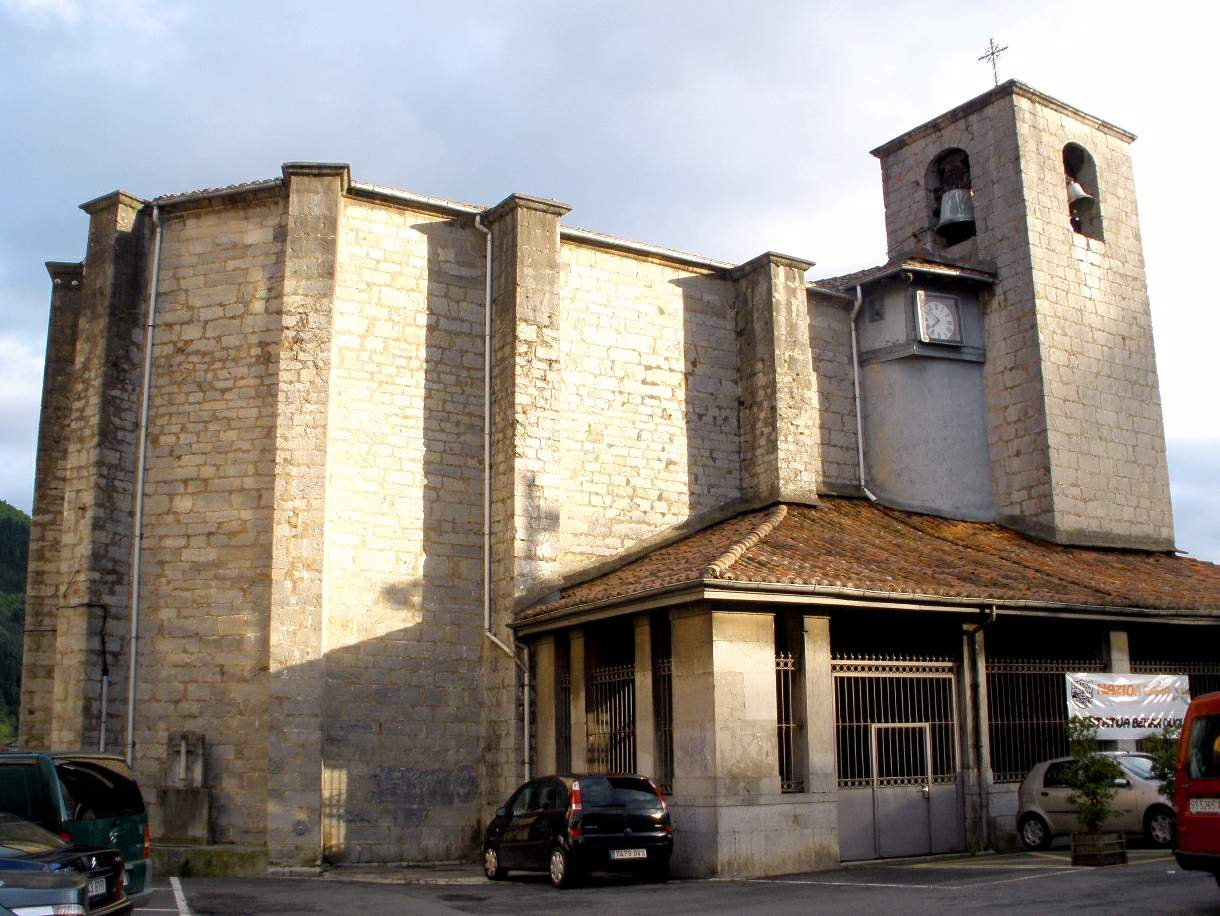
Church of San Juan Bautista, in Anoeta

Anoeta is also a neighborhood in San Sebastián/Donostia, Spain, home to a namesake football stadium and cycle track.

Anoeta is a town located in the province of Gipuzkoa, in the autonomous community of Basque Country, in the north of Spain.
