= Diego Rivas (footballer, born 1980) =

Spanish footballer

Personal information
- Full name: Diego Rivas Gutiérrez
- Date of birth: 27 April 1980 (age 46)
- Place of birth: Ciudad Real, Spain
- Height: 1.80 m (5 ft 11 in)
- Position: Defensive midfielder

Youth career
- Atlético Madrid

Senior career*
Years	Team	Apps	(Gls)
1998–2000	Amorós	39	(2)
2000–2002	Atlético Madrid B	69	(3)
2002–2004	Atlético Madrid	3	(0)
2002–2003	→ Getafe (loan)	32	(3)
2004–2006	Getafe	83	(0)
2006–2011	Real Sociedad	124	(3)
2007–2008	→ Cádiz (loan)	20	(0)
2011–2013	Hércules	57	(0)
2013–2014	Eibar	24	(0)
2014–2015	Llagostera	20	(0)
2015–2016	Socuéllamos	30	(0)
2016–2018	Manchego	58	(3)
Total		559	(14)
- * Club domestic league appearances and goals

Diego Rivas Gutiérrez (born 27 April 1980) is a Spanish former professional footballer who played as a defensive midfielder.

He amassed totals of 364 matches and six goals across the two major levels of Spanish football, including 122 games and three goals in La Liga where he represented Atlético Madrid, Getafe and Real Sociedad (over five seasons).

== Club career ==
Born in Ciudad Real, Castilla–La Mancha, Rivas started playing as a senior in Atlético Madrid's reserves, but could never break into the first team. In the 2002–03 campaign, he served a loan at neighbouring Getafe CF in the Segunda División.

Having returned to Atlético, Rivas was definitely waived and, in January 2004, had a second Getafe spell, still contributing 17 games to a first ever top-flight promotion. He continued to be ever-present from 2004 to 2006, as the side achieved two consecutive ninth-place finishes in La Liga.

Rivas spent the first of the following two seasons with Real Sociedad, appearing irregularly as the Basques were relegated. He was loaned to second-division Cádiz CF for 2007–08, in another ill-fated campaign.

Rivas excelled in the following second-tier seasons with Real Sociedad, rarely missing a match and helping the club to return to the top flight in his second year. He featured in 32 games in 2010–11 (31 starts), scoring against his former team Atlético Madrid and Sevilla FC, both fixtures ending in home losses, with the club eventually retaining its status.

In late June 2011, the 31-year-old Rivas signed for Hércules CF in division two, agreeing on a 2+1 contract. He played regularly during his spell in the Valencian Community, and on 9 August 2013 joined SD Eibar of the same league.

Rivas made 20 starts during the campaign as the Armeros were promoted to the top division for the first time ever, being coached by his former Real Sociedad teammate Gaizka Garitano. On 25 August 2014, he signed a one-year deal with UE Llagostera, newly promoted to the second tier.

Rivas retired in May 2018 at age 38, after two seasons in the Tercera División with CD Manchego Ciudad Real.

== Personal life ==
Rivas' younger brother, Marcos, was also a footballer and a midfielder. He played almost exclusively in amateur football, his biggest achievement being appearing in 13 games for AD Alcorcón in the Segunda División B.

After retiring, Rivas served as councillor for the People's Party in the Ciudad Real city hall.

== Honours ==
Real Sociedad

- Segunda División: 2009–10

Eibar

- Segunda División: 2013–14
