= 2015–16 Real Sociedad season =

Real Sociedad
2015–16 season
- President: Jokin Aperribay
- Head coach: David Moyes (until 9 November 2015); Eusebio Sacristán (from 9 November 2015)
- Stadium: Anoeta
- La Liga: 9th
- Copa del Rey: Round of 32
- Top goalscorer: League: Imanol Agirretxe (13); All: Imanol Agirretxe (13)
Home colours	Away colours	Third colours

The 2015–16 season was Real Sociedad's 69th season in La Liga.

== Season summary ==
On 29 June, it was announced that Mediapro had been ordered by the Supreme Court of Spain to pay Real Sociedad €10 million. The Supreme Court considered that the broadcasting company had committed serious, repeated infringements in breach of their contractual agreement with Real Sociedad.

On 9 November, it was announced that David Moyes' contract had been rescinded following a poor start to the season. The same day, the club announced the appointment of Eusebio Sacristán as his replacement.

== Players ==
As of 22 August 2015

Note: Flags indicate national team as defined under FIFA eligibility rules; some limited exceptions apply. Players may hold more than one non-FIFA nationality.

No.	Pos.	Nation	Player
1	GK	ARG	Gerónimo Rulli
2	DF	ESP	Carlos Martínez
3	DF	ESP	Mikel González (vice-captain)
4	MF	ESP	Asier Illarramendi
5	MF	ESP	Markel Bergara
6	DF	ESP	Iñigo Martínez
7	MF	POR	Bruma (on loan from Galatasaray)
8	MF	ESP	Esteban Granero
9	FW	ESP	Imanol Agirretxe
10	MF	ESP	Xabi Prieto (captain)
11	FW	MEX	Carlos Vela
12	MF	ESP	Alain Oyarzun
13	GK	ESP	Oier Olazábal (on loan from Granada)
14	MF	ESP	Rubén Pardo

No.	Pos.	Nation	Player
15	DF	ESP	Ion Ansotegi (vice-captain)
16	MF	ESP	Sergio Canales
17	MF	FRA	David Zurutuza
18	MF	URU	Chory Castro
19	DF	ESP	Yuri Berchiche
20	DF	ESP	Joseba Zaldúa
21	DF	ESP	Héctor Hernández
22	FW	BRA	Jonathas
23	DF	MEX	Diego Reyes (on loan from Porto)
24	DF	ESP	Alberto de la Bella
25	DF	ESP	Raúl Navas
30	DF	ESP	Aritz Elustondo
31	GK	ESP	Ander Bardají

== Player transfers ==
=== In ===
No.	Pos.	Nat.	Name	Age	EU	Moving from	Type	Transfer window	Ends	Transfer fee	Source
*	FW	(Spain)	David Concha	18	EU	Racing Santander	Transfer	Summer	2020	N/A	Real Sociedad
22	FW	(Brazil)	Jonathas	26	Non-EU	Elche (Spain)	Transfer	Summer	2020	N/A	Real Sociedad
4	MF	(Spain)	Asier Illarramendi	25	EU	Real Madrid	Transfer	Summer	2021	N/A	Real Sociedad
1	GK	(Argentina)	Gerónimo Rulli	23	Non-EU	Deportivo Maldonado (Uruguay)	Loan	Summer	2016	N/A	Real Sociedad
23	DF	(Mexico)	Diego Reyes	22	Non-EU	Porto (Portugal)	Loan	Summer	2016	N/A	Real Sociedad
7	MF	(Portugal)	Bruma	20	EU	Galatasaray (Turkey)	Loan	Summer	2016	N/A	Real Sociedad
13	GK	(Spain)	Oier	25	EU	Granada (Spain)	Loan	Summer	2016	N/A	Real Sociedad
*	DF	(Algeria)	Liassine Cadamuro-Bentaïba	27	EU	Osasuna	Loan return	Summer	2016	N/A	Real Sociedad
*	MF	(Spain)	Pablo Hervías	21	EU	Osasuna	Loan return	Summer	2016	N/A	Real Sociedad
*	FW	(Uruguay)	Diego Ifrán	28	EU	CD Tenerife (Spain)	Loan return	Summer	2015	N/A	Real Sociedad
25	DF	(Spain)	Raúl Navas	27	EU	Eibar	Loan return	Summer	2018	N/A	Real Sociedad

=== Out ===
No.	Pos.	Nat.	Name	Age	EU	Moving to	Type	Transfer window	Transfer fee	Source
4	MF	(Spain)	Gorka Elustondo	28	EU	Athletic Bilbao	End of contract	Summer	none	Athletic Bilbao
*	MF	(Spain)	Marco Sangalli	23	EU	CD Mirandés	End of contract	Summer	none	CD Mirandés
13	GK	(Spain)	Eñaut Zubikarai	31	EU		End of contract	Summer	none	Real Sociedad
22	DF	(Spain)	Daniel Estrada Agirrezabalaga	28	EU	Alavés	End of contract	Summer	none	CD Alavés
*	FW	(Uruguay)	Diego Ifrán	28	Non-EU	Peñarol (Uruguay)	End of contract	Summer	none	Peñarol
	DF	(Algeria)	Liassine Cadamuro-Bentaïba	27	EU		Contract rescinded	Summer	N/A	Real Sociedad
18	MF	(Uruguay)	Chory Castro	31	EU		Contract rescinded	Winter	N/A	Real Sociedad
7	FW	(Iceland)	Alfreð Finnbogason	26	EU	Olympiacos (Greece)	Loan	Summer	none	Olympiacos
7	FW	(Iceland)	Alfreð Finnbogason	27	EU	FC Augsburg (Germany)	Loan	Winter	none	Real Sociedad
	MF	(Spain)	Pablo Hervías	22	EU	Oviedo	Loan	Summer	N/A	Real Sociedad
	MF	(Spain)	David Concha	18	EU	Numancia	Loan	Summer	N/A	Real Sociedad
12	MF	(Spain)	Alain Oyarzun	22	EU	Mirandés	Loan	Winter	N/A	Real Sociedad
15	MF	(Spain)	Ion Ansotegi	33	EU	Eibar	Contract rescinded	Winter	N/A	Real Sociedad

== Pre-season and friendlies ==
Win Draw Loss Postponed

10 July 2015 Friendly	Celtic	1–0	Real Sociedad	Paisley, Scotland
	Mackay-Steven 68'			Stadium: St Mirren Park

12 July 2015 Friendly	St Johnstone	0–0	Real Sociedad	Methil, Fife
13:30 GMT		Saints Report		Stadium: Bayview Stadium; Attendance: Unknown; Referee: John Beaton

14 July 2015 Friendly	Livingston	0–1	Real Sociedad	Almondvale, Livingston, West Lothian, Scotland
19:45 GMT		Report		Stadium: Almondvale Stadium; Attendance: Unknown; Referee: Andrew Dallas

18 July 2015 Friendly	Real Unión	0–0	Real Sociedad	Irun
20:45		Report		Stadium: Stadium Gal; Attendance: Unknown

18 July 2015 Friendly	Real Sociedad	1–1	Toulouse	Saint-Jean-de-Luz
18:00		Report		Stadium: Pavillon Bleu; Attendance: Unknown

18 July 2015 Friendly	Real Sociedad	0–1	Rayo Vallecano	Nanjing, China
		Report		Stadium: Wutaishan Stadium; Attendance: Unknown; Referee: Ma Ning

8 August 2015 Friendly	Atlético Madrid	2–0	Real Sociedad	Alicante, Spain
22:00 (UTC+2)	Bergara 16' (o.g.); Griezmann 75'	Report		Stadium: José Rico Pérez; Attendance: 15,000; Referee: Juan Martínez Munuera

12 August 2015 Friendly	Real Sociedad	3–0	Panathinaikos	San Sebastián, Spain
				Stadium: Anoeta

17 August 2015 Friendly	Real Zaragoza	3–0	Real Sociedad	Zaragoza, Spain
		Report		Stadium: La Romareda; Referee: Cordero Vega

== Competitions ==
=== Overall ===
Competition	Started round	Final position / round	First match	Last match
La Liga	–			
Copa del Rey	Round of 32			

Updated to match played 16 September 2015
Source: Competitions

=== Overview ===
Competition	Record							
Competition	Pld	W	D	L	GF	GA	GD	Win %
La Liga	31	10	8	13	39	42	−3	32.26
Copa del Rey	2	0	1	1	2	3	−1	0.00
Total	33	10	9	14	41	45	−4	30.30

Last updated: 4 April 2016
Source: Competitions

=== La Liga ===
==== League table ====
Pos	Team	Pld	W	D	L	GF	GA	GD	Pts	Qualification or relegation
7	Sevilla	38	14	10	14	51	50	+1	52	Qualification for the Champions League group stage (Note: Sevilla qualified for the Champions League group stage by winning the 2015–16 UEFA Europa League. Based on their league position (7th), they would have received the spot above to enter the Europa League third qualifying round. This spot was vacated without replacement as per UEFA regulations.)
8	Málaga	38	12	12	14	38	35	+3	48 (Note: Málaga finished ahead of Real Sociedad on head-to-head record; Málaga 3–1 Real Sociedad, Real Sociedad 1–1 Málaga.)	
9	Real Sociedad	38	13	9	16	45	48	−3	48	
10	Real Betis	38	11	12	15	34	52	−18	45	
11	Las Palmas	38	12	8	18	45	53	−8	44 (Note: Las Palmas finished ahead of Valencia on head-to-head record; Valencia 1–1 Las Palmas, Las Palmas 2–1 Valencia.)	

Source: La Liga, Soccerway
Rules for classification: 1) Points; 2) Head-to-head points; 3) Head-to-head goal difference; 4) Goal difference; 5) Goals scored; 6) Fair-play points; 7) Play-off.

==== Results summary ====
Overall								Home						Away					
Pld	W	D	L	GF	GA	GD	Pts	W	D	L	GF	GA	GD	W	D	L	GF	GA	GD
38	13	9	16	45	48	−3	48	7	5	7	22	20	+2	6	4	9	23	28	−5

Last updated: 15 May 2016.

==== Result round by round ====
Round	1	2	3	4	5	6	7	8	9	10	11	12	13	14	15	16	17	18	19	20	21	22	23	24	25	26	27	28	29	30	31	32	33	34	35	36	37	38
Ground	A	H	A	H	A	H	A	H	A	H	A	H	A	H	A	H	H	A	H	H	A	H	A	H	A	H	A	H	A	H	A	H	A	H	A	A	H	A
Result	D	D	L	L	W	D	L	L	W	L	L	W	L	W	D	L	L	D	W	D	L	W	W	W	W	D	L	D	L	L	W	W	L	L	D	L	W	W
Position	11	11	16	17	11	12	16	16	15	16	16	14	15	13	13	14	14	15	14	13	14	13	11	10	9	9	10	9	10	11	10	9	10	12	12			9

Updated to match(es) played on 25 April 2016. Source:
A = Away; H = Home; W = Win; D = Draw; L = Loss

==== Matches ====
Win Draw Loss

===== League =====
22 August 2015 1	Deportivo La Coruña	0–0	Real Sociedad	A Coruña
18:30 (UTC+2)	Mosquera (yellow card) 14'; Laure (yellow card) 49'; Lopo (yellow card) 88'	Report	Zaldúa (yellow card) 9'; Bergara (yellow card) 65'	Stadium: Riazor; Attendance: 22,301; Referee: Antonio Mateu Lahoz

29 August 2015 2	Real Sociedad	0–0	Sporting Gijón	San Sebastián
18:30 (UTC+2)	Illarramendi (yellow card) 25'; Elustondo (yellow card) 59'; De la Bella (yellow card) 62'; Bergara (yellow card) 90+4'	Report	Lora (yellow card) 25'; Álvarez (yellow card) 34'; Jony (yellow card) 84'; Cuéllar (yellow card) 85'; Muñiz (yellow card) 88'	Stadium: Anoeta; Attendance: 22,487; Referee: José María Sánchez Martínez

12 September 2015 3	Real Betis	1–0	Real Sociedad	Seville
22:00 (UTC+2)	N'Diaye (yellow card) 27'; Bruno (yellow card) 37'; Castro 41'; Petros (yellow card) 42' (yellow-red card) 45+1'; Ceballos (yellow card) 78'; Portillo (yellow card) 90+2'	Report	De la Bella (yellow card) 20'; Pardo (yellow card) 36'; Reyes (yellow card) 56'	Stadium: Benito Villamarín; Attendance: 37,909; Referee: Alfonso Álvarez Izquierdo

19 September 2015 4	Real Sociedad	2–3	Espanyol	San Sebastián
22:00 (UTC+2)	Agirretxe 20'; Granero (yellow card) 27'; Rulli (red card) 42'; Jonathas 86'; Illarramendi (yellow card) 87'	Report	Roco (yellow card) 32', (goal) 71'; Moreno 44' (pen.), (yellow card) 68'; Álvarez (yellow card) 61'; Pérez 90'	Stadium: Anoeta; Attendance: 17,481; Referee: Pedro Pérez Montero

22 September 2015 5	Granada	0–3	Real Sociedad	Granada
22:00 (UTC+2)	Krhin (yellow card) 38'; Dória (yellow card) 40'; Success (yellow card) 46'; Fernández (yellow card) 62'; Lopes (yellow card) 81'	Report	Agirretxe 7', 33', 79'; Granero (yellow card) 37'; De la Bella (yellow card) 60'; Vela (yellow card) 66'; Pardo (yellow card) 90+3'	Stadium: Los Cármenes; Attendance: 12,711; Referee: Xavier Estrada Fernández

27 September 2015 6	Real Sociedad	0–0	Athletic Bilbao	San Sebastián
20:30 (UTC+2)	Illarramendi (yellow card) 8'; Pardo (yellow card) 52'; I. Martínez (yellow card) 70'	Report	Beñat (yellow card) 37'; García (yellow card) 68'; Williams (yellow card) 75'; Etxeita (yellow card) 82'	Stadium: Anoeta; Attendance: 26,114; Referee: Carlos Velasco Carballo

3 October 2015 7	Málaga	3–1	Real Sociedad	Málaga
22:05 (UTC+2)	Charles 4', 7', 89', (yellow card) 74'; Tissone (yellow card) 34' (yellow-red card) 71'; Recio (yellow card) 38'; Čop (yellow card) 72'	Report	Agirretxe 14'; Elustondo (yellow card) 45'; Vela (yellow card) 55'	Stadium: La Rosaleda; Attendance: 17,315; Referee: Carlos del Cerro Grande

18 October 2015 8	Real Sociedad	0–2	Atlético Madrid	San Sebastián
16:00 (UTC+2)	Bergara (yellow card) 26'; De la Bella (yellow card) 34'; Reyes (yellow card) 88' (yellow-red card) 89'; Pardo (yellow card) 90+2'; Jonathas (yellow card) 90+2' (yellow-red card) 90+2'; Rulli (yellow card) 90+2'	Report	Giménez (yellow card) 6'; Griezmann 9'; Correa (yellow card) 16'; Godín (yellow card) 24'; Filipe Luís (yellow card) 50'; Gabi (yellow card) 90'; Carrasco 90+1'	Stadium: Anoeta; Attendance: 25,494; Referee: Ignacio Iglesias Villanueva

25 October 2015 9	Levante	0–4	Real Sociedad	Valencia
12:00 (UTC+1)	Deyverson (yellow card) 21' (yellow-red card) 90'; Feddal (yellow card) 48'; Lerma (yellow card) 55'; Roger (yellow card) 90+2'	Report	Vela 8', 84'; González (yellow card) 13'; Bergara (yellow card) 14'; Agirretxe 35'; Illarramendi 82'; Berchiche (yellow card) 90+2'	Stadium: Estadi Ciutat de València; Attendance: 14,228; Referee: Alberto Undiano Mallenco

31 October 2015 10	Real Sociedad	2–3	Celta Vigo	San Sebastián
22:05 (UTC+1)	Agirretxe 11', 37'; Zaldúa (yellow card) 71'; Illarramendi (yellow card) 86'	Report	Aspas 17', 56', (yellow card) 72'; Radoja (yellow card) 45'; Hernández (yellow card) 68'; Mallo (yellow card) 87'; Jonny (yellow card) 88'	Stadium: Anoeta; Attendance: 19,270; Referee: David Fernández Borbalán

6 November 2015 11	Las Palmas	2–0	Real Sociedad	Las Palmas
20:30 (UTC+1)	Bigas (yellow card) 9'; Viera 28'; Araujo 51'	Report	Illarramendi (yellow card) 36'; Vela (yellow card) 39'; I. Martínez (yellow card) 69'; Berchiche (yellow card) 85'	Stadium: Gran Canaria; Attendance: 17,796; Referee: Carlos Velasco Carballo

21 November 2015 12	Real Sociedad	2–0	Sevilla	San Sebastián
16:00 (UTC+1)	Berchiche (yellow card) 40'; Agirretxe 73'; Prieto 77'; Illarramendi (yellow card) 81'	Report	Andreolli (yellow card) 7'	Stadium: Anoeta; Attendance: 19,839; Referee: Antonio Mateu Lahoz

28 November 2015 13	Barcelona	4–0	Real Sociedad	Barcelona
16:00 (UTC+1)	Neymar 22', 53'; Suárez 41'; Messi 90+1'	Report	Berchiche (yellow card) 28'; Granero (yellow card) 37'; Canales (yellow card) 48'; Pardo (yellow card) 50'; Elustondo (yellow card) 56'	Stadium: Camp Nou; Attendance: 74,020; Referee: Ignacio Iglesias Villanueva

6 December 2015 14	Real Sociedad	2–1	Eibar	San Sebastián
12:00 (UTC+1)	Agirretxe 10'; Berchiche (yellow card) 50'	Report	Borja 4'; Capa (yellow card) 42'; Pantić (yellow card) 47'; Enrich (yellow card) 90+4'	Stadium: Anoeta; Attendance: 23,461; Referee: Mario Melero López

11 December 2015 15	Getafe	1–1	Real Sociedad	Getafe
20:30 (UTC+1)	Lacen (yellow card) 36'; Sarabia 46'; Cala (yellow card) 68'; Alexis (yellow card) 72'	Report	De la Bella (yellow card) 14'; Canales (yellow card) 59'; Agirretxe 67'; Illarremendi (yellow card) 72'	Stadium: Coliseum Alfonso Pérez; Attendance: 5,654; Referee: Pedro Pérez Montero

20 December 2015 16	Real Sociedad	0–2	Villarreal	San Sebastián
18:15 (UTC+1)	Canales (yellow card) 39'; I. Martínez (yellow card) 55'	Report	Suárez 27', 88'; Trigueros (yellow card) 74'	Stadium: Anoeta; Attendance: 21,949; Referee: Carlos del Cerro Grande

30 December 2015 17	Real Madrid	3–1	Real Sociedad	Madrid
16:00 (UTC+1)	Ronaldo 42' (pen.), 68'; Nacho (yellow card) 56'; Vázquez 86'	Report	Berchiche (yellow card) 32'; C. Martínez (yellow card) 40'; Bruma 49'; Illarramendi (yellow card) 62'	Stadium: Santiago Bernabéu; Attendance: 69,896; Referee: José González González

3 January 2016 18	Rayo Vallecano	2–2	Real Sociedad	Madrid
12:00 (UTC+1)	Llorente 15', (yellow card) 48'; Jozabed 51'; Quini (yellow card) 56'; Castro (yellow card) 72'	Report	C. Martínez (yellow card) 19'; Elustondo 27'; Bergara (yellow card) 37'; Bruma 63'; Berchiche (yellow card) 70'	Stadium: Campo de Vallecas; Attendance: 10,756; Referee: Antonio Mateu Lahoz

10 January 2016 19	Real Sociedad	2–0	Valencia	San Sebastián
16:00 CET (UTC+01:00)	Jonathas (yellow card) 32', (goal) 79', 82'; Pardo (yellow card) 63'; Héctor (yellow card) 90+3'	Report	Abdennour (yellow card) 14'; Cancelo (yellow card) 27'; Pérez (yellow card) 56'; Fuego (yellow card) 65'	Stadium: Anoeta; Attendance: 24,217; Referee: Alejandro Hernández Hernández

16 January 2016 20	Real Sociedad	1–1	Deportivo La Coruña	San Sebastián
22:05 (UTC+1)	Jonathas (yellow card) 75'; Prieto 75' (pen.)	Report	Luis Alberto 26'; Mosquera (yellow card) 70'; Gutiérrez (yellow card) 74'; Lopo (yellow card) 86'	Stadium: Anoeta; Attendance: 16,783; Referee: Juan Martínez Munuera

22 January 2016 21	Sporting Gijón	5–1	Real Sociedad	Gijón
20:30 (UTC+1)	Carmona 1', (yellow card) 21'; Ndi 9'; Sanabria 44', 53', 81'	Report	Vela 37'; I. Martínez (yellow card) 45+3'; Zaldúa (yellow card) 62'	Stadium: El Molinón; Attendance: 23,320; Referee: David Fernández Borbalán

30 January 2016 22	Real Sociedad	2–1	Real Betis	San Sebastián
22:05 (UTC+1)	Prieto 18'; I. Martínez 33'; Pardo (yellow card) 58'	Report	Molinero (yellow card) 36'; Castro 51'; Cejudo (yellow card) 60'; Portillo (yellow card) 90'; Joaquín (yellow card) 90+1'	Stadium: Anoeta; Referee: Eduardo Prieto Iglesias

7 February 2016 23	Espanyol	0–5	Real Sociedad	Barcelona
20:30 (UTC+1)	Diop (yellow card) 19'	Report	Jonathas 5', 90', (yellow card) 90+1'; Vela 8'; Oyarzabal 52'; Reyes 55'; Zaldúa (yellow card) 79'	Stadium: Cornellà-El Prat; Attendance: 14,155; Referee: Santiago Jaime Latre

14 February 2016 24	Real Sociedad	3–0	Granada	San Sebastián
12:00 (UTC+1)	Oyarzabal 21', 61'; Jonathas 45'	Report	Foulquier (yellow card) 18'; Doucouré (yellow card) 85'	Stadium: Anoeta; Attendance: 19,591; Referee: José González González

21 February 2016 25	Athletic Bilbao	0–1	Real Sociedad	Bilbao
18:15 (UTC+1)	Susaeta (yellow card) 5'; San José (yellow card) 28'; García (yellow card) 64'; Muniain (yellow card) 65'; Aduriz (yellow card) 65'; Gurpegui (yellow card) 89'; Beñat (yellow card) 90'; De Marcos (yellow card) 90+3'	Report	Illarramendi (yellow card) 13'; Reyes (yellow card) 13'; Jonathas 17', (yellow card) 19'; Vela (yellow card) 53'; Elustondo (yellow card) 87'; Rulli (yellow card) 90+4'	Stadium: San Mamés; Referee: José María Sánchez Martínez

28 February 2016 26	Real Sociedad	1–1	Málaga	San Sebastián
22:05 (UTC+1)	I. Martínez (yellow card) 19'; Berchiche (yellow card) 60'; Reyes (yellow card) 74'; Rulli (yellow card) 78'; Agirretxe 81'	Report	Recio (yellow card) 15'; Čop 56'; Ricca (yellow card) 58'; Charles (yellow card) 64'; Horta (yellow card) 70'; Weligton (yellow card) 80'	Stadium: Anoeta; Attendance: 12,783; Referee: Alberto Undiano Mallenco

1 March 2016 27	Atlético Madrid	3–0	Real Sociedad	Madrid
21:00 CET (UTC+01:00)	Reyes 8' (o.g.); Saúl 46'; Griezmann 61' (pen.); Fernández (yellow card) 74'	Report	Jonathas (yellow card) 4'; Granero (yellow card) 58'	Stadium: Vicente Calderón; Attendance: 29,737; Referee: Alejandro Hernández Hernández

6 March 2016 28	Real Sociedad	1–1	Levante	San Sebastián
18:15 CET (UTC+01:00)	Reyes 14'; Prieto (yellow card) 45'; Elustondo (yellow card) 52'; Granero (yellow card) 83'	Report	Feddal (yellow card) 19'; Deyverson 24'; I. López (yellow card) 35'; Verza (yellow card) 67'	Stadium: Anoeta; Attendance: 18,603; Referee: Pedro Pérez Montero

13 March 2016 29	Celta Vigo	1–0	Real Sociedad	Vigo
18:15 CET (UTC+01:00)	Aspas 16'; Cabral (yellow card) 46'; Radoja (yellow card) 83'; Díaz (yellow card) 88'	Report	Berchiche (yellow card) 28'; Elustondo (yellow card) 90+1'	Stadium: Balaídos; Attendance: 17,767; Referee: Juan Martínez Munuera

20 March 2016 30	Real Sociedad	0–1	Las Palmas	San Sebastián
CET (UTC+01:00)	Illarramendi (yellow card) 16'; C. Martínez (yellow card) 28'; Elustondo (yellow card) 73'; Zurutuza (yellow card) 81'	Report	Garrido (yellow card) 20'; García (yellow card) 31'; Willian José 39'; Lemos (yellow card) 55'; Tana (yellow card) 74'; Mesa (yellow card) 90'	Stadium: Anoeta; Attendance: 18,952; Referee: Antonio Mateu Lahoz

3 April 2016 31	Sevilla	1–2	Real Sociedad	Seville
20:30 CET (UTC+01:00)	Vitolo (yellow card) 25'; Rami (yellow card) 28'; Gameiro 51' (pen.); Mariano (yellow card) 52'; Reyes (yellow card) 63'	Report	Bergara 2', (yellow card) 50' (yellow-red card) 68'; Oyarzabal (yellow card) 26'; Krychowiak 34' (o.g.); Rulli (yellow card) 75'; Berchiche (yellow card) 90+3'	Stadium: Ramón Sánchez Pizjuán; Attendance: 32,163; Referee: Carlos Clos Gómez

9 April 2016 32	Real Sociedad	1–0	Barcelona	San Sebastián
20:30 CEST (UTC+02:00)	Oyarzabal 5'; Illarramendi (yellow card) 25'	Report	Turan (yellow card) 43'; Mascherano (yellow card) 68'; Piqué (yellow card) 90+2'	Stadium: Anoeta; Attendance: 27,895; Referee: Ignacio Iglesias Villanueva

17 April 2016 33	Eibar	2–1	Real Sociedad	Eibar
20:30 CET (UTC+01:00)	Enrich 32'; Escalante 58', (yellow card) 69'; Juncà (yellow card) 73'; Ramis (yellow card) 89'	Report	Zurutuza 7'; Granero (yellow card) 90+1'; I. Martínez (yellow card) 90+2'	Stadium: Ipurua; Attendance: 5,801; Referee: Mario Melero López

20 April 2016 34	Real Sociedad	1–2	Getafe	San Sebastián
20:30 CET (UTC+01:00)	Vela 19'; Oier (yellow card) 59'; Granero (yellow card) 83'	Report	J. Rodríguez (yellow card) 8'; Lago (yellow card) 11'; Sarabia 45'; Vázquez 56'; Buendía (yellow card) 57'; Miguel Ángel (yellow card) 59'	Stadium: Anoeta; Attendance: 14,334; Referee: José María Sánchez Martínez

24 April 2016 35	Villarreal	0–0	Real Sociedad	Villarreal
20:30 CET (UTC+01:00)	Pina (yellow card) 32'; Mario (yellow card) 69'; Dos Santos (yellow card) 72'; Adrián (yellow card) 90'	[www.laliga.es/directo/temporada-2015-2016/liga-bbva/35/villarreal_real-sociedad Report]	Vela (yellow card) 51'	Stadium: El Madrigal; Attendance: 17,215; Referee: David Fernández Borbalán

30 April 2016 36	Real Sociedad	0–1	Real Madrid	San Sebastián
16:00 CEST (UTC+02:00)	Illarramendi (yellow card) 36'; Bergara (yellow card) 42'; Prieto (yellow card) 48'; Zaldúa (yellow card) 64'	Report	Bale (yellow card) 41', (goal) 80'; Ramos (yellow card) 59'; Nacho (yellow card) 62'; Modrić (yellow card) 75'	Stadium: Anoeta; Attendance: 26,426; Referee: Alberto Undiano Mallenco

8 May 2016 37	Real Sociedad	2–1	Rayo Vallecano	San Sebastián
17:00 CEST (UTC+02:00)	Oyarzabal 12'; Prieto (yellow card) 28'; Bautista 50', (yellow card) 70'; Granero (red card) 76'	Report	Crespo (yellow card) 60'; Guerra 69'	Stadium: Anoeta; Attendance: 18,857; Referee: Santiago Jaime Latre

15 May 2016 38	Valencia	0–1	Real Sociedad	Valencia
20:30 CEST (UTC+02:00)	Vezo (yellow card) 34'; Gomes (yellow card) 70'	[www.laliga.es/directo/temporada-2015-2016/liga-bbva/38/valencia_real-sociedad Report]	Illarramendi (yellow card) 44'; Bautista (yellow card) 55'; Oyarzabal 90+4'	Stadium: Mestalla; Attendance: 27,777; Referee: Carlos Velasco Carballo

=== Copa del Rey ===
==== Round of 32 ====
3 December 2015 First leg	Las Palmas	2–1	Real Sociedad	Las Palmas
21:00 CET (UTC+01:00)	Asdrúbal 30'; Hernán 50'	Report	Bruma 11'	Stadium: Gran Canaria; Attendance: 9,963; Referee: Alfonso Álvarez Izquierdo

16 December 2015 Second leg	Real Sociedad	1–1 (2–3 agg.)	Las Palmas	San Sebastián
21:00 CET (UTC+01:00)	Canales 46'	Report	Willian José 37'	Stadium: Anoeta; Attendance: 14,478; Referee: David Fernández Borbalán

== Statistics ==
=== Appearances and goals ===
Last updated on 15 May 2016.

No.	Pos	Nat	Player	Total		La Liga		Copa del Rey	
No.	Pos	Nat	Player	Apps	Goals	Apps	Goals	Apps	Goals
Goalkeepers
1	GK	(Argentina) ARG	Gerónimo Rulli	37	0	36	0	0+1	0
13	GK	(Spain) ESP	Oier Olazábal	5	0	2+1	0	2	0
31	GK	(Spain) ESP	Ander Bardají	0	0	0	0	0	0
Defenders
2	DF	(Spain) ESP	Carlos Martínez	12	0	6+4	0	2	0
3	DF	(Spain) ESP	Mikel González	19	0	17+2	0	0	0
6	DF	(Spain) ESP	Iñigo Martínez	31	1	30	1	1	0
19	DF	(Spain) ESP	Yuri Berchiche	22	0	21	0	1	0
20	DF	(Spain) ESP	Joseba Zaldúa	13	0	10+3	0	0	0
21	DF	(Spain) ESP	Héctor Hernández	14	0	4+9	0	0+1	0
23	DF	(Mexico) MEX	Diego Reyes	28	2	26+1	2	1	0
24	DF	(Spain) ESP	Alberto de la Bella	16	0	14+1	0	1	0
25	DF	(Spain) ESP	Raúl Navas	0	0	0	0	0	0
30	DF	(Spain) ESP	Aritz Elustondo	31	1	30+1	1	0	0
Midfielders
4	MF	(Spain) ESP	Asier Illarramendi	35	1	32+1	1	2	0
5	MF	(Spain) ESP	Markel Bergara	20	1	15+5	1	0	0
7	MF	(Portugal) POR	Bruma	33	3	14+18	2	1	1
8	MF	(Spain) ESP	Esteban Granero	15	0	9+6	0	0	0
10	MF	(Spain) ESP	Xabi Prieto	37	3	27+9	3	1	0
14	MF	(Spain) ESP	Rubén Pardo	30	0	19+9	0	2	0
16	MF	(Spain) ESP	Sergio Canales	18	1	11+5	0	1+1	1
17	MF	(France) FRA	David Zurutuza	16	1	14+2	1	0	0
18	MF	(Uruguay) URU	Chory Castro	10	0	1+7	0	1+1	0
29	MF	(Spain) ESP	Igor Zubeldia	1	0	0+1	0	0	0
34	MF	(Spain) ESP	Eneko Capilla	1	0	0+1	0	0	0
Forwards
9	FW	(Spain) ESP	Imanol Agirretxe	16	13	14+2	13	0	0
11	FW	(Mexico) MEX	Carlos Vela	36	5	32+3	5	0+1	0
22	FW	(Brazil) BRA	Jonathas	29	7	17+10	7	1+1	0
28	FW	(Spain) ESP	Mikel Oyarzabal	24	6	16+6	6	2	0
35	FW	(Spain) ESP	Jon Bautista	4	1	1+3	1	0	0
Players who have made an appearance or had a squad number this season but have left the club
12	MF	(Spain) ESP	Alain Oyarzun	1	0	0	0	1	0
15	DF	(Spain) ESP	Ion Ansotegi	2	0	0	0	2	0
