= 2017–18 Real Sociedad season =

Real Sociedad
2017–18 season
- President: Jokin Aperribay
- Head coach: Eusebio Sacristán (until 19 March 2018); Imanol Alguacil (from 19 March 2018)
- Stadium: Anoeta
- La Liga: 12th
- Copa del Rey: Round of 32
- UEFA Europa League: Round of 32
- Top goalscorer: League: Willian José (15); All: Willian José (20)
Home colours	Away colours	Third colours

The 2017–18 Real Sociedad season is the club's 71st season in La Liga. This article shows player statistics and all matches (official and friendly) played by the club during the 2017–18 season.

It was the first season since 2010–11 without the Mexican winger Carlos Vela who departed the basquean club to be transferred to MLS club Los Angeles FC.

== Transfers ==
- List of Spanish football transfers summer 2017#Real Sociedad

=== In ===
Date	Player	From	Type	Fee	Ref
27 July 2017	(Spain) Alberto de la Bella	(Greece) Olympiacos	Loan return	Free	
30 June 2017	(Spain) Rubén Pardo	(Spain) Real Betis	Loan return	Free	
30 June 2017	(Spain) Alain Oyarzun	(Spain) Mirandés	Loan return	Free	
30 June 2017	(Serbia) Srđan Babić	(Spain) Reus	Loan return	Free	
30 June 2017	(Spain) Pablo Hervías	(Spain) Elche	Loan return	Free	
30 June 2017	(Spain) Héctor	(Spain) Granada	Loan return	Free	
30 June 2017	(Spain) Eneko Capilla	(Spain) Numancia	Loan return	Free	
1 July 2017	(Portugal) Kévin Rodrigues	(Spain) Real Sociedad B	Promoted		
1 July 2017	(Spain) Igor Zubeldia	(Spain) Real Sociedad B	Promoted		
1 July 2017	(Spain) Jon Bautista	(Spain) Real Sociedad B	Promoted		
1 July 2017	(Spain) Álvaro Odriozola	(Spain) Real Sociedad B	Promoted		
1 July 2017	(Spain) Diego Llorente	(Spain) Real Madrid	Transfer	Undisclosed	
12 July 2017	(Belgium) Adnan Januzaj	(England) Manchester United	Transfer	Undisclosed	

=== Out ===
Date	Player	To	Type	Fee	Ref
12 June 2017	(Spain) Héctor	(Spain) Alavés	Loan	Free	
1 July 2017	(Spain) Mikel González	Released / (Spain) Real Zaragoza	Expiry	Free	
4 July 2017	(Spain) Joseba Zaldúa	(Spain) Leganés	Loan	Free	
5 July 2017	(Spain) Pablo Hervías	(Spain) Eibar	Transfer	Free	
6 July 2017	(Spain) Alain Oyarzun	(Spain) Real Zaragoza	Transfer	Free	
7 July 2017	(Spain) Esteban Granero	(Spain) Espanyol	Transfer	Free	
7 July 2017	(Spain) Yuri Berchiche	(France) Paris Saint-Germain	Transfer	€16,000,000	
7 July 2017	(Serbia) Srđan Babić	(Serbia) Red Star Belgrade	Loan	Free	
18 July 2017	(Spain) Markel Bergara	(Spain) Getafe	Loan	Free	
24 July 2017	(Spain) Ander Bardají	(Spain) Huesca	Transfer	Free	
11 August 2017	(Spain) David Concha	(Spain) Barcelona B	Loan	Free	
22 August 2017	(Spain) Jon Gaztañaga	(Spain) Gimnàstic	Transfer	Free	
1 January 2018	(Mexico) Carlos Vela	(United States) Los Angeles FC	Transfer	€9,000,000	

== Competitions ==
=== Overall ===
Competition	Final position
La Liga	-
Copa del Rey	Round of 32
Europa League	Round of 32

=== La Liga ===
==== League table ====
Pos	Team	Pld	W	D	L	GF	GA	GD	Pts
10	Girona	38	14	9	15	50	59	−9	51 (Note: Eibar finished ahead of Girona on head-to-head points: Eibar 4–1 Girona, Girona 1–4 Eibar.)
11	Espanyol	38	12	13	13	36	42	−6	49 (Note: Head-to-head points: Espanyol 8, Real Sociedad 4, Celta Vigo 4 (Espanyol 2–1 Real Sociedad, Real Sociedad 1–1 Espanyol, Espanyol 2–1 Celta Vigo, Celta Vigo 2–2 Espanyol, Real Sociedad 1–2 Celta Vigo, Celta Vigo 2–3 Real Sociedad).)
12	Real Sociedad	38	14	7	17	66	59	+7	49
13	Celta Vigo	38	13	10	15	59	60	−1	49
14	Alavés	38	15	2	21	40	50	−10	47

Source: La Liga, Soccerway
Rules for classification: 1) Points; 2) Head-to-head points; 3) Head-to-head goal difference; 4) Goal difference; 5) Goals scored; 6) Fair-play points (Note: Head-to-head record is used only after all the matches between the teams in question have been played)

==== Matches ====
Win Draw Loss Fixtures

19 August 2017 1	Celta Vigo	2–3	Real Sociedad	Vigo
18:15 CEST (UTC+02:00)	M. Gómez 22', 50', (yellow card) 49'; Jonny (yellow card) 80'; Mallo (yellow card) 86'	Report	Oyarzabal 33'; Juanmi 80'; Willian José 88' (pen.); Illarramendi (yellow card) 90+2'	Stadium: Balaídos; Attendance: 16,207; Referee: Antonio Mateu Lahoz

25 August 2017 2	Real Sociedad	3–0	Villarreal	San Sebastián
20:15 CEST (UTC+02:00)	Elustondo (yellow card) 16'; Willian José 25', (yellow card) 39'; Prieto 34'; Juanmi 45'	Report	Costa (yellow card) 3'; Trigueros (yellow card) 68'	Stadium: Anoeta; Attendance: 19,931; Referee: Xavier Estrada Fernández

10 September 2017 3	Deportivo La Coruña	2–4	Real Sociedad	A Coruña
12:00 CEST (UTC+02:00)	Adrián 27'; Guilherme (yellow card) 47'; Andone 50'	Report	Juanmi 3', (yellow card) 44'; Illarramendi 4', 86'; Rodrigues (yellow card) 54'; Odriozola (yellow card) 80'; Llorente 83'	Stadium: Riazor; Attendance: 21,942; Referee: José Luis Munuera Montero

17 September 2017 4	Real Sociedad	1–3	Real Madrid	San Sebastián
20:45 CEST (UTC+02:00)	Rodrigues 28'; Llorente (yellow card) 36'; Illarramendi (yellow card) 42'; Januzaj (yellow card) 45'	Report	Mayoral 19'; Rodrigues 36' (o.g.); Asensio (yellow card) 38'; Bale 61'; Casemiro (yellow card) 64'	Stadium: Anoeta; Attendance: 24,966; Referee: Ignacio Iglesias Villanueva

21 September 2017 5	Levante	3–0	Real Sociedad	Valencia
22:00 CEST (UTC+02:00)	Chema (yellow card) 6'; Bardhi (yellow card) 14', (goal) 45', 89'; Morales 75' (pen.)	Report	Llorente (yellow card) 44' (yellow-red card) 88'	Stadium: Ciutat de València; Attendance: 17,415; Referee: Jesús Gil Manzano

24 September 2017 6	Real Sociedad	2–3	Valencia	San Sebastián
20:45 CEST (UTC+02:00)	Elustondo 33'; Oyarzabal 59', (yellow card) 77'; Zubeldia (yellow card) 59' (yellow-red card) 68'	Report	Rodrigo 26', (yellow card) 27'; Vidal 55'; Zaza 85'; Guedes (yellow card) 9'; Kondogbia (yellow card) 45' (yellow-red card) 79'; Gayà (yellow card) 56'; Mina (yellow card) 90+2'; Domènech (yellow card) 90+4'	Stadium: Anoeta; Attendance: 20,266; Referee: Santiago Jaime Latre

1 October 2017 7	Real Sociedad	4–4	Real Betis	San Sebastián
12:00 CEST (UTC+02:00)	Willian José 13'; Oyarzabal 26'; Prieto 57'; Navas (yellow card) 66'; Illarramendi (yellow card) 66'; Llorente 86', (yellow card) 87'	Report	Sanabria 6'; Feddal 28'; Guardado (yellow card) 44'; Joaquín 46'; Adán (yellow card) 75'; León 84', (yellow card) 90+5'	Stadium: Anoeta; Attendance: 19,669; Referee: Alfonso Álvarez Izquierdo

15 October 2017 8	Alavés	0–2	Real Sociedad	Vitoria-Gasteiz
18:30 CEST (UTC+02:00)	Duarte (yellow card) 90+1'	Report	Oyarzabal 77'; Elustondo 81'; Llorente (yellow card) 44'	Stadium: Mendizorrotza; Attendance: 19,840; Referee: Javier Alberola Rojas

23 October 2017 9	Real Sociedad	1–1	Espanyol	San Sebastián
20:00 CEST (UTC+02:00)	Illarramendi 69', (yellow card) 87' (yellow-red card) 90+2'; Rodrigues (yellow card) 74'; Oyarzabal (yellow card) 86'; Rulli (yellow card) 90+3'	Report	Baptistão 9'; Jurado (yellow card) 44'; Darder (yellow card) 64'; David López (yellow card) 64'; Martín (yellow card) 81'	Stadium: Anoeta; Attendance: 18,434; Referee: Mario Melero López

29 October 2017 10	Getafe	2–1	Real Sociedad	Getafe
12:00 CEST (UTC+02:00)	Djené (yellow card) 70'; Suárez (yellow card) 76'; Ángel 78'; Antunes (yellow card) 82'; Molina 85' (pen.)	Report	Oyarzabal 5'; De la Bella (yellow card) 56'; Rulli (yellow card) 84'	Stadium: Coliseum Alfonso Pérez; Attendance: 10,798; Referee: José María Sánchez Martínez

5 November 2017 11	Real Sociedad	3–1	Eibar	San Sebastián
18:30 CET (UTC+01:00)	Willian José 12'; Januzaj 28'; Oyarzabal 46'	Report	Lombán (yellow card) 23'; Arbilla (yellow card) 68'; Jordán 72'; Sarriegi (yellow card) 81'	Stadium: Anoeta; Attendance: 20,328; Referee: Daniel Trujillo Suárez

17 November 2017 12	Girona	1–1	Real Sociedad	Girona
21:00 CET (UTC+01:00)	Maffeo (yellow card) 40'; Mojica (yellow card) 43'; Bernardo (yellow card) 45'; Stuani 64'; Portu (yellow card) 90+1'	Report	Willian José 7'; Llorente (yellow card) 37'; Januzaj (yellow card) 47'	Stadium: Montilivi; Attendance: 10,136; Referee: Ignacio Iglesias Villanueva

26 November 2017 13	Real Sociedad	2–2	Las Palmas	San Sebastián
16:15 CET (UTC+01:00)	Willian José 31'; Januzaj 62', (yellow card) 64'; Odriozola (yellow card) 83' (yellow-red card) 90+4'; Llorente (yellow card) 90+2'	Report	Tana 20'; D. Castellano (yellow card) 40'; Viera 67'; Aquilani (yellow card) 69'; Rémy (yellow card) 72'	Stadium: Anoeta; Attendance: 19,745; Referee: Pablo González Fuertes

2 December 2017 14	Atlético Madrid	2–1	Real Sociedad	Madrid
16:15 CET (UTC+01:00)	Godín (yellow card) 40'; Filipe Luís 63'; Griezmann 88'	Report	Willian José 29' (pen.); Prieto (yellow card) 50'; Rulli (yellow card) 73'	Stadium: Wanda Metropolitano; Attendance: 57,453; Referee: Santiago Jaime Latre

10 December 2017 15	Real Sociedad	0–2	Málaga	San Sebastián
12:00 CET (UTC+01:00)	Zurutuza (yellow card) 36'	Report	Castro (yellow card) 9', (goal) 58'; Borja 23' (pen.)	Stadium: Anoeta; Attendance: 16,834; Referee: Carlos del Cerro Grande

16 December 2017 16	Athletic Bilbao	0–0	Real Sociedad	Bilbao
16:15 CET (UTC+01:00)	Aduriz (yellow card) 56'; Lekue (yellow card) 74'; Rico (yellow card) 88'	Report		Stadium: San Mamés; Attendance: 45,504; Referee: David Fernández Borbalán

20 December 2017 17	Real Sociedad	3–1	Sevilla	San Sebastián
21:30 CET (UTC+01:00)	I. Martínez 17'; Navas (yellow card) 68'; Zubeldia 76'; Vela 90'	Report	Ben Yedder (yellow card) 39', (goal) 44'; Pizarro (yellow card) 51'; Corchia (yellow card) 57'; Vázquez (yellow card) 86'; Kjær (yellow card) 87'	Stadium: Anoeta; Attendance: 17,205; Referee: Alejandro Hernández Hernández

7 January 2018 18	Leganés	1–0	Real Sociedad	Leganés
12:00 CET (UTC+01:00)	Gabriel 75'	Report	Willian José (yellow card) 34'	Stadium: Butarque; Attendance: 6,671; Referee: Xavier Estrada Fernández

14 January 2018 19	Real Sociedad	2–4	Barcelona	San Sebastián
20:45 CET (UTC+01:00)	Willian José 11'; Juanmi 34'; Illarramendi (yellow card) 63'; Oyarzabal (yellow card) 84'	Report	Paulinho 39'; L. Suárez 50', 71'; Roberto (yellow card) 60'; Messi 85'; Piqué (yellow card) 90+2'	Stadium: Anoeta; Attendance: 23,212; Referee: José González González

21 January 2018 20	Real Sociedad	1–2	Celta Vigo	San Sebastián
18:30 CET (UTC+01:00)	Willian José 10'; Zubeldia (yellow card) 56'	Report	Jozabed (yellow card) 16'; Aspas 20' (pen.); Lobotka (yellow card) 24'; M. Gómez 75'	Stadium: Anoeta; Attendance: 19,081; Referee: Antonio Mateu Lahoz

27 January 2018 21	Villarreal	4–2	Real Sociedad	Villarreal
20:45 CET (UTC+01:00)	Ruiz 5'; Fornals 17'; Bacca 20'; Castillejo 34'; Costa (yellow card) 82'	Report	Llorente 24'; Willian José 58'; Navas (yellow card) 75'	Stadium: La Cerámica; Attendance: 14,918; Referee: Carlos del Cerro Grande

2 February 2018 22	Real Sociedad	5–0	Deportivo La Coruña	San Sebastián
21:00 CET (UTC+01:00)	Willian José 32'; Illarramendi 62', 89'; Canales 75'; Elustondo 82'	Report	Schär (yellow card) 25'	Stadium: Anoeta; Attendance: 15,626; Referee: Alberto Undiano Mallenco

11 February 2018 23	Real Madrid	5–2	Real Sociedad	Madrid
20:45 CET (UTC+01:00)	Vázquez 1'; Ronaldo 27', 37', 80'; Kroos 34'; Carvajal (yellow card) 49'; Kovačić (yellow card) 90+2'	Report	De la Bella (yellow card) 47'; Bautista 74'; Illarramendi 83'	Stadium: Santiago Bernabéu; Attendance: 63,800; Referee: Alejandro Hernández Hernández

18 February 2018 24	Real Sociedad	3–0	Levante	San Sebastián
12:00 CET (UTC+01:00)	Prieto 10' (pen.); Juanmi 38'; Canales 55'	Report	Lukić (yellow card) 8'; Chema (yellow card) 60'	Stadium: Anoeta; Attendance: 18,173; Referee: Santiago Jaime Latre

25 February 2018 25	Valencia	2–1	Real Sociedad	Valencia
18:30 CET (UTC+01:00)	Mina 34', 68', (yellow card) 90+3'; Rodrigo (yellow card) 78'	Report	Juanmi (yellow card) 22'; De la Bella (yellow card) 29'; Canales (yellow card) 31'; Oyarzabal 54'	Stadium: Mestalla; Attendance: 37,282; Referee: Pablo González Fuertes

28 February 2018 26	Real Betis	0–0	Real Sociedad	Seville
19:30 CET (UTC+01:00)	León (yellow card) 35'; Bartra (yellow card) 56'	Report		Stadium: Benito Villamarín; Attendance: 40,288; Referee: José González González

4 March 2018 27	Real Sociedad	2–1	Alavés	San Sebastián
18:30 CET (UTC+01:00)	Moreno 6'; Illarra 11'	Report	Pedraza 39'; Duarte (yellow card) 61'	Stadium: Anoeta; Attendance: 21,334; Referee: Juan Martínez Munuera

11 March 2018 28	Espanyol	2–1	Real Sociedad	Cornellà de Llobregat
12:00 CET (UTC+01:00)	Baptistão 51'; Gerard 72'	Report	Llorente (yellow card) 14'; Willian José 41'; De la Bella (yellow card) 87'	Stadium: RCDE Stadium; Attendance: 19,932; Referee: Antonio Mateu Lahoz

17 March 2018 29	Real Sociedad	1–2	Getafe	Getafe
18:30 CEST (UTC+02:00)	Willian José 23'; Odriozola (yellow card) 39'; Zubeldia (yellow card) 76'; Oyarzabal (yellow card) 84'	Report	Molina (yellow card) 41'; Djené 45'; Antunes (yellow card) 49'; Ángel 51', (yellow card) 76'; Arambarri (yellow card) 69'; Fajr (yellow card) 72'; Cabrera (yellow card) 77'; Suárez (yellow card) 90+1'	Stadium: Coliseum Alfonso Pérez; Attendance: 17,487; Referee: Xavier Estrada Fernández

1 April 2018 30	Eibar	0–0	Real Sociedad	Eibar
18:30 CEST (UTC+02:00)	Diop (yellow card) 13'; Ramis (yellow card) 57'; Capa (yellow card) 81'; León (yellow card) 90+2'	Report	Illarramendi (yellow card) 87'; Llorente (yellow card) 90+3'	Stadium: Ipurua; Attendance: 6,192; Referee: José María Sánchez Martínez

8 April 2018 31	Real Sociedad	5–0	Girona	San Sebastián
18:30 CEST (UTC+02:00)	Canales 11', (yellow card) 65'; Januzaj 35'; Moreno (yellow card) 40'; Oyarzabal 71', 85'; Juanmi 88'	Report	Granell (yellow card) 65'; Mojica (yellow card) 66'	Stadium: Anoeta; Attendance: 18,007; Referee: José Luis Munuera Montero

15 April 2018 32	Las Palmas	0–1	Real Sociedad	Las Palmas
18:30 CEST (UTC+02:00)		Report	Oyarzabal 21'; Canales (yellow card) 79'; Illarramendi (yellow card) 82'	Stadium: Gran Canaria; Attendance: 10,531; Referee: Alfonso Álvarez Izquierdo

19 April 2018 33	Real Sociedad	3–0	Atlético Madrid	San Sebastián
19:30 CEST (UTC+02:00)	Willian José 27'; Juanmi 80', 90+2', (yellow card) 90+3'	Report		Stadium: Anoeta; Attendance: 21,222; Referee: Javier Alberola Rojas

22 April 2018 34	Málaga	2–0	Real Sociedad	Málaga
16:15 CEST (UTC+02:00)	Adrián 11', (yellow card) 68'; Lestienne (yellow card) 26'; Iturra (yellow card) 30'; En-Nesyri 35'; Keko (yellow card) 64'	Report	Canales (yellow card) 43'	Stadium: La Rosaleda; Attendance: 14,487; Referee: Xavier Estrada Fernández

28 April 2018 35	Real Sociedad	3–1	Athletic Bilbao	San Sebastián
16:15 CEST (UTC+02:00)	San José 15', 54' (o.g.); Illarramendi (yellow card) 26'; Oyarzabal 36'; Llorente (yellow card) 59'; Pardo (red card) 85'; Willian José (yellow card) 86'	Report	García (yellow card) 13', (goal) 59' (pen.); De Marcos (yellow card) 24'; Williams (yellow card) 81'; Susaeta (yellow card) 84'; Muniain (yellow card) 86'; I. Martínez (yellow card) 90+4'	Stadium: Anoeta; Attendance: 23,878; Referee: José María Sánchez Martínez

4 May 2018 36	Sevilla	1–0	Real Sociedad	Seville
21:00 CEST (UTC+02:00)	Layún (yellow card) 32'; Banega 47' (pen.), (yellow card) 70'; Sarabia (yellow card) 87'; Mercado (yellow card) 90+3'	Report	Zurutuza (yellow card) 54'; Willian José (yellow card) 90+5'	Stadium: Ramón Sánchez Pizjuán; Attendance: 34,733; Referee: Santiago Jaime Latre

13 May 2018 37	Real Sociedad	3–2	Leganés	San Sebastián
16:15 CEST (UTC+02:00)	Oyarzabal 18'; Canales 25'; Illarramendi (yellow card) 67'; Willian José 78' (pen.)	Report	Rico 26', (yellow card) 85'; Guerrero 53'; Bustinza (yellow card) 77'	Stadium: Anoeta; Attendance: 19,898; Referee: David Medié Jiménez

20 May 2018 38	Barcelona	1–0	Real Sociedad	Barcelona
20:45 CEST (UTC+02:00)	L. Suárez (yellow card) 43'; Coutinho 57'; Alba (yellow card) 72'; Rakitić (yellow card) 75'	Report	Navas (yellow card) 42'; Januzaj (yellow card) 53'	Stadium: Camp Nou; Attendance: 84,168; Referee: José Luis Munuera Montero

=== Copa del Rey ===
==== Round of 32 ====
26 October 2017	Lleida Esportiu	0–1	Real Sociedad	Lleida
19:30 CEST (UTC+02:00)	Núñez (yellow card) 37'; Radulović (yellow card) 81'; Pumar (yellow card) 90'	Report	Canales 32'; Vela (yellow card) 90+3'	Stadium: Camp d'Esports; Attendance: 9,872; Referee: Santiago Jaime Latre

29 November 2017	Real Sociedad	2–3 (3–3a agg.)	Lleida Esportiu	San Sebastián
19:30 CET (UTC+01:00)	Llorente 24'; Juanmi 34'; Toño (yellow card) 58'; Zubeldia (yellow card) 75'	Report	Núñez 56'; Molina 59' (pen.), (yellow card) 78'; Radulović 87'	Stadium: Anoeta; Attendance: 8,819; Referee: Juan Martínez Munuera

=== UEFA Europa League ===
==== Group stage ====
Win Draw Loss Fixtures

Pos	Team	Pld	W	D	L	GF	GA	GD	Pts	Qualification
1	(Russia) Zenit Saint Petersburg	6	5	1	0	17	5	+12	16	Advance to knockout phase
2	(Spain) Real Sociedad	6	4	0	2	16	6	+10	12	Advance to knockout phase
3	(Norway) Rosenborg	6	1	2	3	6	11	−5	5	
4	(North Macedonia) Vardar	6	0	1	5	3	20	−17	1	

Source: UEFA
Rules for classification: Group stage tiebreakers

14 September 2017 1	Real Sociedad (Spain)	4–0	(Norway) Rosenborg	San Sebastián
21:05 CEST (UTC+02:00)	Llorente 9', 77'; Zurutuza 10'; Skjelvik 41' (o.g.)	Report	Meling (yellow card) 72'; Reginiussen (yellow card) 90+2'	Stadium: Anoeta; Attendance: 21,479; Referee: Paolo Mazzoleni (Italy)

28 September 2017 2	Zenit Saint Petersburg (Russia)	3–1	(Spain) Real Sociedad	Saint Petersburg
19:00 CEST (UTC+02:00)	Rigoni 5'; Kokorin 24', 60'	Report	Llorente 41'	Stadium: Krestovsky Stadium; Attendance: 50,487; Referee: Andre Marriner (England)

19 October 2017 3	Vardar (North Macedonia)	0–6	(Spain) Real Sociedad	Skopje
19:00 CEST (UTC+02:00)	Hambardzumyan (yellow card) 61'	Report	Oyarzabal 12'; Willian José 34', 42', 55', 59'; De la Bella 90'	Stadium: Philip II Arena; Attendance: 20,368; Referee: Aliyar Aghayev (Azerbaijan)

2 November 2017 4	Real Sociedad (Spain)	3–0	(North Macedonia) Vardar	San Sebastián
21:05 CET (UTC+01:00)	Juanmi 31'; De la Bella 69'; Bautista 81'	Report	Hambardzumyan (yellow card) 12'; Novak (yellow card) 42'	Stadium: Anoeta; Attendance: 17,242; Referee: Robert Schörgenhofer (Australia)

23 November 2017 5	Rosenborg (Norway)	0–1	(Spain) Real Sociedad	Trondheim
19:00 CET (UTC+01:00)	Skjelvik (yellow card) 90+3'	Report	Oyarzabal 90'; Martínez (yellow card) 90+4'	Stadium: Lerkendal Stadion; Attendance: 18,307; Referee: Daniel Stefański (Poland)

7 December 2017 6	Real Sociedad (Spain)	1–3	(Russia) Zenit Saint Petersburg	San Sebastián
21:05 CET (UTC+01:00)	Willian José 58'; Canales (yellow card) 77'	Report	Kranevitter (yellow card) 28'; Yerokhin 35', (yellow card) 76'; Ivanović 64'; Paredes 85'	Stadium: Anoeta; Attendance: 20,609; Referee: Liran Liany (Israel)

==== Knockout phase ====
===== Round of 32 =====
15 February 2018 First Leg	Real Sociedad (Spain)	2–2	(Austria) Red Bull Salzburg	San Sebastián
19:00 CET (UTC+01:00)	Rulli (yellow card) 28'; Illarramendi (yellow card) 36'; Moreno (yellow card) 41'; Odriozola 57'; Prieto (yellow card) 72'; Januzaj 80'; Elustondo (yellow card) 83'	Report	Oyarzabal 27' (o.g.); Hwang (yellow card) 41'; Ramalho (yellow card) 60'; Samassékou (yellow card) 62'; Yabo (yellow card) 74'; Ćaleta-Car (yellow card) 79'; Dabour (yellow card) 83'; Minamino 90+4'	Stadium: Anoeta; Attendance: 19,790; Referee: Bobby Madden (Scotland)

22 February 2018 Second Leg	Red Bull Salzburg (Austria)	2–1 (4–3 agg.)	(Spain) Real Sociedad	Salzburg
21:05 CET (UTC+01:00)	Schlager (yellow card) 9'; Dabour 10', (yellow card) 32'; V. Berisha 74' (pen.)	Report	Navas (yellow card) 24' (yellow-red card) 71', (goal) 28'; Illarramendi (yellow card) 90+1'	Stadium: Red Bull Arena; Attendance: 13,912; Referee: Sergei Karasev (Russia)

== Statistics ==
=== Appearances and goals ===
Last updated on 20 May 2018.

No.	Pos	Nat	Player	Total		La Liga		Copa del Rey		Europa League	
No.	Pos	Nat	Player	Apps	Goals	Apps	Goals	Apps	Goals	Apps	Goals
Goalkeepers
1	GK	(Argentina) ARG	Gerónimo Rulli	34	0	26	0	0	0	8	0
13	GK	(Spain) ESP	Toño	7	0	3+1	0	2	0	0+1	0
25	GK	(Spain) ESP	Miguel Ángel Moyà	9	0	9	0	0	0	0	0
Defenders
2	DF	(Spain) ESP	Carlos Martínez	2	0	0+1	0	1	0	0	0
3	DF	(Spain) ESP	Diego Llorente	34	7	26+1	3	1	1	5+1	3
6	DF	(Mexico) MEX	Héctor Moreno	9	1	8	1	0	0	1	0
15	DF	(Spain) ESP	Aritz Elustondo	24	3	18+1	3	0	0	4+1	0
19	DF	(Spain) ESP	Álvaro Odriozola	41	1	32+3	0	0	0	6	1
20	DF	(Portugal) POR	Kévin Rodrigues	22	1	18+2	1	0	0	2	0
22	DF	(Spain) ESP	Raúl Navas	25	1	20	0	2	0	3	1
24	DF	(Spain) ESP	Alberto de la Bella	26	2	17	0	2	0	6+1	2
27	DF	(Spain) ESP	Andoni Gorosabel	5	0	1+1	0	1	0	2	0
Midfielders
4	MF	(Spain) ESP	Asier Illarramendi	44	7	35+1	7	0	0	6+2	0
5	MF	(Spain) ESP	Igor Zubeldia	31	1	16+9	1	0+1	0	3+2	0
8	MF	(Belgium) BEL	Adnan Januzaj	35	4	18+10	3	1	0	3+3	1
10	MF	(Spain) ESP	Xabi Prieto	34	3	24+2	3	2	0	6	0
14	MF	(Spain) ESP	Rubén Pardo	10	0	3+3	0	2	0	1+1	0
16	MF	(Spain) ESP	Sergio Canales	45	4	20+16	4	2	0	6+1	0
17	MF	(France) FRA	David Zurutuza	37	1	26+5	0	0+1	0	5	1
18	MF	(Spain) ESP	Mikel Oyarzabal	43	14	31+4	12	1+1	0	6	2
30	MF	(Spain) ESP	Jon Guridi	4	0	0+4	0	0	0	0	0
Forwards
7	FW	(Spain) ESP	Juanmi	38	10	18+12	8	2	1	3+3	1
9	FW	(Spain) ESP	Imanol Agirretxe	13	0	2+9	0	0	0	1+1	0
12	FW	(Brazil) BRA	Willian José	40	20	32+2	15	0	0	5+1	5
21	FW	(Spain) ESP	Jon Bautista	20	2	1+10	1	1+1	0	2+5	1
29	FW	(Spain) ESP	Ander Guevara	1	0	0	0	0+1	0	0	0
Players who have made an appearance or had a squad number this season but have left the club
6	DF	(Spain) ESP	Iñigo Martínez	16	1	12	1	1	0	3	0
11	FW	(Mexico) MEX	Carlos Vela	17	1	2+11	1	1+1	0	1+1	0
23	MF	(Spain) ESP	Jon Gaztañaga	0	0	0	0	0	0	0	0

=== Cards ===
Accounts for all competitions. Last updated on 22 December 2017.

No.	Pos.	Name	Yellow card	Red card
1	GK	(Argentina) Gerónimo Rulli	3	0
3	DF	(Spain) Diego Llorente	6	1
4	MF	(Spain) Asier Illaramendi	4	1
5	MF	(Spain) Igor Zubeldia	1	0
6	DF	(Spain) Iñigo Martínez	1	0
7	FW	(Spain) Juanmi	1	0
8	MF	(Belgium) Adnan Januzaj	3	0
10	MF	(Spain) Xabi Prieto	1	0
11	FW	(Mexico) Carlos Vela	1	0
12	FW	(Brazil) Willian Jose	1	0
13	GK	(Spain) Toño	1	0
15	DF	(Spain) Aritz Elustondo	1	0
16	MF	(Spain) Sergio Canales	1	0
17	MF	(France) David Zurutuza	1	0
18	MF	(Spain) Mikel Oyarzabal	1	0
19	DF	(Spain) Álvaro Odriozola	2	0
20	DF	(Portugal) Kévin Rodrigues	1	0
22	DF	(Spain) Raúl Navas	2	0
24	DF	(Spain) Alberto de la Bella	1	0

=== Clean sheets ===
Last updated on 22 December 2017.

Number	Nation	Name	Matches Played	La Liga	Copa del Rey	Europa League	Total
1	(Argentina)	Gerónimo Rulli	23	4	0	4	8
13	(Spain)	Toño	2	0	1	0	1
TOTALS				4	1	4	9
