= 2016–17 Real Sociedad season =

Real Sociedad
2016–17 season
- President: Jokin Aperribay
- Head coach: Eusebio Sacristán
- Stadium: Anoeta
- La Liga: 6th
- Copa del Rey: Quarter-finals
- Top goalscorer: League: Willian José (12); All: Juanmi (15)
Home colours	Away colours	Third colours

The 2016–17 Real Sociedad season was the club's 70th season in La Liga. This article shows player statistics and all matches (official and friendly) the club played during the 2016–17 season.

== Squad ==
As of 31 July 2016

Note: Flags indicate national team as defined under FIFA eligibility rules; some limited exceptions apply. Players may hold more than one non-FIFA nationality.

No.	Pos.	Nation	Player
1	GK	ARG	Gerónimo Rulli (on loan from Manchester City)
2	DF	ESP	Carlos Martínez
3	DF	ESP	Mikel González
4	MF	ESP	Asier Illarramendi
5	MF	ESP	Markel Bergara
6	DF	ESP	Iñigo Martínez
7	FW	ESP	Juanmi
8	MF	ESP	Esteban Granero
9	FW	ESP	Imanol Agirretxe
10	MF	ESP	Xabi Prieto (captain)
11	FW	MEX	Carlos Vela
12	FW	BRA	Willian José
13	GK	ESP	Ander Bardají

No.	Pos.	Nation	Player
14	MF	ESP	Rubén Pardo
15	DF	ESP	Aritz Elustondo
16	MF	ESP	Sergio Canales
17	MF	ESP	David Zurutuza
18	MF	ESP	Mikel Oyarzabal
19	DF	ESP	Yuri Berchiche
20	DF	ESP	Joseba Zaldúa
21	DF	ESP	Héctor
22	DF	ESP	Raúl Navas
23	MF	ESP	Jon Gaztañaga
24	MF	ESP	David Concha
25	GK	ESP	Toño

=== Out on loan ===
Note: Flags indicate national team as defined under FIFA eligibility rules; some limited exceptions apply. Players may hold more than one non-FIFA nationality.

No.	Pos.	Nation	Player
—	DF	SRB	Srđan Babić (at Reus until 30 June 2017)
—	DF	ESP	Alberto de la Bella (at Olympiacos until 30 June 2017)
—	MF	ESP	Eneko Capilla (at Numancia until 30 June 2017)

No.	Pos.	Nation	Player
—	MF	ESP	Pablo Hervías (at Elche until 30 June 2017)
—	MF	ESP	Alain Oyarzun (at Mirandés until 30 June 2017)

== Transfers ==
=== In ===
No.	Pos.	Nat.	Name	Age	EU	Moving from	Type	Transfer window	Ends	Transfer fee	Source
7	FW	(Spain)	Juanmi	23	EU	Southampton (England)	Transfer	Summer	2021	N/A	Real Sociedad
25	GK	(Spain)	Toño	29	EU	AEK Larnaca (Cyprus)	Transfer	Summer	2018	N/A	Real Sociedad
12	FW	(Brazil)	Willian José	24		Deportivo Maldonado (Uruguay)	Transfer	Summer	2021	N/A	Real Sociedad

=== Out ===
No.	Pos.	Nat.	Name	Age	EU	Moving to	Type	Transfer window	Transfer fee	Source
24	DF	(Spain)	Alberto de la Bella	30	EU	Olympiacos (Greece)	Loan	Summer	none	Real Sociedad
18	FW	(Spain)	Alain Oyarzun	22	EU	Mirandés (Spain)	Loan	Summer	none	Real Sociedad
22	FW	(Brazil)	Jonathas	27	EU	Rubin Kazan (Russia)	Transfer	Summer	none	Real Sociedad
	MF	(Spain)	Pablo Hervías	23	EU	Elche	Loan	Summer	N/A	Real Sociedad
14	MF	(Spain)	Rubén Pardo	24	EU	Betis	Loan	Winter	N/A	Real Sociedad
21	DF	(Spain)	Héctor	25	EU	Granada	Loan	Winter	N/A	Real Sociedad

== Pre-season and friendlies ==
Win Draw Loss Postponed

18 July 2016 Friendly	Tolosa	0–5	Real Sociedad	Tolosa
		Report		Stadium: Berazubi

21 July 2016 Friendly	Logroñés	0–1	Real Sociedad	Laguardia
		Report

23 July 2016 Friendly	Villarreal	1–1	Real Sociedad	Zarautz
		Report		Stadium: Asti

27 July 2016 Friendly	Konyaspor	0–1	Real Sociedad	Arnhem
		Report

29 July 2016 Friendly	NEC	0–2	Real Sociedad	Nijmegen, Netherlands
		Report		Stadium: Stadion de Goffert

30 July 2016 Friendly	Heerenveen	0–2	Real Sociedad	Heerenveen, Netherlands
		Report		Stadium: Abe Lenstra Stadion

6 August 2016 Friendly	Burnley	0–0	Real Sociedad	Burnley, England
		Report		Stadium: Turf Moor

7 August 2016 Friendly	Middlesbrough	0–0	Real Sociedad	Middlesbrough, England
		Report		Stadium: Riverside Stadium

11 August 2016 Friendly	Eibar	1–1	Real Sociedad	Bergara
		Report		Stadium: Agorrosín

13 August 2016 Friendly	Bayer Leverkusen	2–0	Real Sociedad	Leverkusen, Germany
14:30 CEST	Volland 35'; Hernández 38'	Report		Stadium: BayArena; Attendance: 23,216

== Competitions ==
=== Overall ===
Competition	Started round	Current position / round	Final position / round	First match	Last match
La Liga	Matchday 1	Matchday 21, 5th	–	(H) v.s Real Madrid, 0–3 (L)	(H) vs. Osasuna, 3–2 (W)
Copa del Rey	Round of 32	Quarter Final	Quarter Final	(H) vs. Villarreal, 3–1 (W)	(A) vs. Barcelona, 2–5 (L)

Updated to match played 10 Feb 2017
Source: Competitions

=== La Liga ===
==== League table ====
Pos	Team	Pld	W	D	L	GF	GA	GD	Pts	Qualification or relegation
4	Sevilla	38	21	9	8	69	49	+20	72	Qualification for the Champions League play-off round
5	Villarreal	38	19	10	9	56	33	+23	67	Qualification for the Europa League group stage (Note: Since the winners of the 2016–17 Copa del Rey, Barcelona, qualified for European competition based on league position, the spot awarded to the cup winners (Europa League group stage) was passed to the sixth-placed team and the spot awarded to the sixth-placed team (Europa League third qualifying round) was passed to the seventh-placed team.)
6	Real Sociedad	38	19	7	12	59	53	+6	64	Qualification for the Europa League group stage
7	Athletic Bilbao	38	19	6	13	53	43	+10	63	Qualification for the Europa League third qualifying round
8	Espanyol	38	15	11	12	49	50	−1	56	

Source: La Liga, Soccerway
Rules for classification: 1) Points; 2) Head-to-head points; 3) Head-to-head goal difference; 4) Goal difference; 5) Goals scored; 6) Fair-play points; 7) Play-off.

==== Results summary ====
Overall								Home						Away					
Pld	W	D	L	GF	GA	GD	Pts	W	D	L	GF	GA	GD	W	D	L	GF	GA	GD
38	19	7	12	59	53	+6	64	10	5	4	30	24	+6	9	2	8	29	29	0

==== Result round by round ====
Round	1	2	3	4	5	6	7	8	9	10	11	12	13	14	15	16	17	18	19	20	21	22	23	24	25	26	27	28	29	30	31	32	33	34	35	36	37	38
Ground	H	A	H	A	H	A	H	A	H	A	H	A	H	A	H	A	H	A	H	A	H	A	H	A	H	A	H	A	H	A	H	A	H	A	H	A	H	A
Result	L	W	D	L	W	L	W	L	W	W	W	W	D	L	W	W	L	W	W	L	W	W	L	W	D	W	L	L	D	L	W	L	W	W	W	D	D	D
Position	19	9	12	13	8	11	9	10	7	6	6	5	5	6	5	5	6	5	5	5	5	4	5	5	5	5	6	6	5	7	6	7	7	7	7	7	7	6

Updated to match(es) played on 14 May 2017. Source:
A = Away; H = Home; W = Win; D = Draw; L = Loss

==== Matches ====
Win Draw Loss

21 August 2016 1	Real Sociedad	0–3	Real Madrid	San Sebastián
20:15 CEST	Zaldúa (yellow card) 68'; Berchiche (yellow card) 87'	Report	Bale 2', 90+4'; Asensio 40'; Casemiro (yellow card) 50'; Morata (yellow card) 54'; Ramos (yellow card) 87'	Stadium: Anoeta; Attendance: 27,720; Referee: Juan Martínez Munuera

27 August 2016 2	Osasuna	0–2	Real Sociedad	Pamplona
18:15 CEST	Flaño (yellow card) 20'; U. García (yellow card) 23'	Report	Juanmi 45+2'; González (yellow card) 66'; U. García 81' (o.g.)	Stadium: El Sadar; Attendance: 16,610; Referee: Alfonso Álvarez Izquierdo

9 September 2016 3	Real Sociedad	1–1	Espanyol	San Sebastián
20:45 CEST	Illarramendi (yellow card) 44'; Zurutuza (yellow card) 75'; Willian José 78'		Ó. Duarte (yellow card) 14'; Piatti 62'; R. Duarte (yellow card) 77'; Fuego (yellow card) 88' (yellow-red card) 90+2'	Stadium: Anoeta; Attendance: 19,739; Referee: Ignacio Iglesias Villanueva

18 September 2016 4	Villarreal	2–1	Real Sociedad	Villarreal
18:30 CEST	Ruiz (yellow card) 13'; Sansone 22', 25'; Bruno (yellow card) 80'	Report	Rulli (yellow card) 15'; González (yellow card) 28'; Berchiche 35'; Zaldúa (yellow card) 45' (yellow-red card) 90+2'; Zurutuza (yellow card) 85'	Stadium: El Madrigal; Attendance: 18,692; Referee: Carlos Clos Gómez

21 September 2016 5	Real Sociedad	4–1	Las Palmas	San Sebastián
22:00 CEST	Willian José 1', 53' (pen.); Vela 22' (pen.); Zurutuza 35'; I. Martínez (yellow card) 61'	Report	Boateng (red card) 21'; David Simón (yellow card) 52'; Tana 56'; Araujo (yellow card) 80'	Stadium: Anoeta; Attendance: 10,927; Referee: José Luis Munuera Montero

24 September 2016 6	Eibar	2–0	Real Sociedad	Eibar
13:00 CEST	Kike (yellow card) 30'; Gálvez (yellow card) 50'; Illarramendi 57' (o.g.); Bebé 66'; Escalante (yellow card) 78'; García (yellow card) 90+1'	Report	Elustondo (red card) 24'; I. Martínez (yellow card) 26'; Vela (yellow card) 29'	Stadium: Ipurua; Attendance: 4,798; Referee: José María Sánchez Martínez

30 September 2016 7	Real Sociedad	1–0	Real Betis	San Sebastián
20:45 CEST	I. Martínez (yellow card) 44'; Illarramendi (yellow card) 60'; Vela 63'	Report	Brašanac (yellow card) 46'; Bruno (yellow card) 54'; Joaquín (yellow card) 59'	Stadium: Anoeta; Attendance: 18,310

16 October 2016 8	Athletic Bilbao	3–2	Real Sociedad	Bilbao
16:15 CEST	Aduriz (yellow card) 6', (goal) 60'; García (yellow card) 11'; San José (yellow card) 41'; Muniain 51'; Williams 72'	Report	I. Martínez (yellow card) 6', (goal) 83'; Zurutuza 16'; Illarramendi (yellow card) 28'; Rulli (yellow card) 39'	Stadium: San Mamés; Attendance: 47,428; Referee: José González González

22 October 2016 9	Real Sociedad	3–0	Alavés	San Sebastián
18:30 CEST	Prieto 22'; C. Martínez (yellow card) 33'; Berchiche (yellow card) 39'; Willian José (yellow card) 43', (goal) 57'; Vela 87'	Report	Feddal (yellow card) 22'; Deyverson (yellow card) 38'; Katai (yellow card) 45+1'; Santos (yellow card) 54'; Édgar (yellow card) 89'	Stadium: Anoeta; Attendance: 24,224; Referee: Carlos Clos Gómez

28 October 2016 10	Leganés	0–2	Real Sociedad	Leganés
20:45 CEST	Guerrero (yellow card) 15'; Pérez (yellow card) 18'; Timor (yellow card) 31'; Rico (yellow card) 55'; Medjani (yellow card) 84'	Report	Willian José 29'; Prieto 59'; I. Martínez (yellow card) 62'; Zurutuza (yellow card) 75'	Stadium: Butarque; Attendance: 10,922; Referee: Alejandro José Hernández Hernández

5 November 2016 11	Real Sociedad	2–0	Atlético Madrid	San Sebastián
16:15 CET	Vela 54' (pen.), (yellow card) 65'; Willian José 75' (pen.); Canales (yellow card) 80'	Report	Godín (yellow card) 59'; Juanfran (yellow card) 68'; Torres (yellow card) 90'; Thomas (yellow card) 90+1'	Stadium: Anoeta; Attendance: 24,013; Referee: Alfonso Álvarez Izquierdo

20 November 2016 12	Sporting Gijón	1–3	Real Sociedad	Gijón
18:30 CET	Douglas (yellow card) 25'; Čop 28'; Torres (yellow card) 77'	Report	Prieto 19'; Zurutuza 51'; I. Martínez 56'; Willian José (yellow card) 86'	Stadium: El Molinón; Attendance: 25,059; Referee: Juan Martínez Munuera

28 November 2016 13	Real Sociedad	1–1	Barcelona	San Sebastián
21:45 CET	Willian José 53'; C. Martínez (yellow card) 62'; Zurutuza (yellow card) 89'	Report	Ter Stegen (yellow card) 22'; Mascherano (yellow card) 55'; Messi 59'; D. Suárez (yellow card) 84'; Alba (yellow card) 90+3'	Stadium: Anoeta; Attendance: 27,639; Referee: Jesús Gil Manzano

5 December 2016 14	Deportivo La Coruña	5–1	Real Sociedad	A Coruña
20:45 CET	Sidnei 13'; I. Martínez 29' (o.g.); Andone 42', 77'; Çolak (yellow card) 63'; Babel 64'	Report	Berchiche 57', (yellow card) 66'; I. Martínez (yellow card) 62'; Granero (yellow card) 65'; Juanmi (yellow card) 86'	Stadium: Riazor; Attendance: 20,548; Referee: José Luis Munuera Montero

10 December 2016 15	Real Sociedad	3–2	Valencia	San Sebastián
16:15 CET	Willian José 1', 23'; Navas (yellow card) 35'; Vela (yellow card) 62'; Illarramendi (yellow card) 76'; Zurutuza (yellow card) 89'; Juanmi 90+1'	Report	Parejo 33' (pen.), (yellow card) 67'; Cancelo (yellow card) 53' (yellow-red card) 82'; Montoya (yellow card) 62'; Abdennour (yellow card) 67'; Bakkali (yellow card) 78', (goal) 90+3'	Stadium: Anoeta; Attendance: 22,817; Referee: Xavier Estrada Fernández

17 December 2016 16	Granada	0–2	Real Sociedad	Granada
18:30 CET		Report	Granero (yellow card) 53'; Bautista 56'; Juanmi 69'	Stadium: Los Cármenes; Attendance: 12,812; Referee: Daniel Ocón Arráiz

7 January 2017 17	Real Sociedad	0–4	Sevilla	San Sebastián
20:45 CET	Willian José (yellow card) 44'; Berchiche (yellow card) 76'	Report	Vázquez (yellow card) 10'; Ben Yedder 25', 29', 83'; Escudero (yellow card) 39'; Sarabia 73'; Vitolo (yellow card) 79'	Stadium: Anoeta; Attendance: 22,374; Referee: Juan Martínez Munuera

16 January 2017 18	Málaga	0–2	Real Sociedad	Málaga
20:45 CET		Report	I. Martínez 50'; Granero (yellow card) 55'; Juanmi 62'; Illarramendi (yellow card) 70'	Stadium: La Rosaleda; Attendance: 18,057; Referee: Antonio Mateu Lahoz

23 January 2017 19	Real Sociedad	1–0	Celta Vigo	San Sebastián
20:45 CET	Berchiche (yellow card) 66'; Juanmi 72', (yellow card) 86'	Report	Planas (yellow card) 28'; Rossi (yellow card) 79'	Stadium: Anoeta; Attendance: 19,845; Referee: Carlos del Cerro Grande

29 January 2017 20	Real Madrid	3–0	Real Sociedad	Madrid
20:45 CET	Kovačić 38'; Kroos (yellow card) 39'; Ronaldo 51'; Vázquez (yellow card) 77'; Morata 82'	Report	I. Martínez (yellow card) 6' (yellow-red card) 74'; Rodrigues (yellow card) 71'	Stadium: Santiago Bernabéu; Attendance: 62,462; Referee: Mario Melero López

5 February 2017 21	Real Sociedad	3–2	Osasuna	San Sebastián
18:30 CET	Berchiche (yellow card) 5'; Navas 62'; Vela 72'; Illarramendi (yellow card) 75'; Juanmi 77'	Report	Kodro 25'; Čaušić (yellow card) 50'; León 79'; Torres (yellow card) 90'	Stadium: Anoeta; Attendance: 21,893; Referee: Santiago Jaime Latre

10 February 2017 22	Espanyol	1–2	Real Sociedad	Cornellà de Llobregat
20:45	D. Reyes (yellow card) 30'; Pérez 35', (yellow card) 78'; J. Reyes (yellow card) 90+1'	Report	Vela 26', (yellow card) 85'; Illarramendi 61'; Zurutuza (yellow card) 90'	Stadium: RCDE Stadium; Attendance: 17,849; Referee: David Fernández Borbalán

19 February 2017 23	Real Sociedad	0–1	Villarreal	San Sebastián
12:00 CET	Prieto (yellow card) 56'; Navas (yellow card) 90+3'	Report	Cheryshev (yellow card) 29'; Mario (yellow card) 49'; Rodrigo (yellow card) 70'; Bruno (yellow card) 70'; Castillejo 90+4'	Stadium: Anoeta; Attendance: 21,649; Referee: Alejandro Hernández Hernández

26 February 2017 24	Las Palmas	0–1	Real Sociedad	Las Palmas
20:45 CET	Bigas (yellow card) 11'; Aythami (yellow card) 30'	Report	Prieto (yellow card) 32', (goal) 74'; Illarramendi (yellow card) 69'	Stadium: Gran Canaria; Attendance: 19,085; Referee: Juan Martínez Munuera

1 March 2017 25	Real Sociedad	2–2	Eibar	San Sebastián
19:30 CET	Zurutuza (yellow card) 9'; Juanmi 14', (yellow card) 15' (yellow-red card) 59'; Vela 67' (pen.); Illarramendi (yellow card) 78'; Granero (yellow card) 90'	Report	Pedro León (yellow card) 4', (goal) 90+3'; Lejeune (yellow card) 13' (yellow-red card) 46'; Escalante 26', (yellow card) 65'; Yoel (yellow card) 66'; Rivera (yellow card) 70'	Stadium: Anoeta; Attendance: 20,335; Referee: Alberto Undiano Mallenco

5 March 2017 26	Real Betis	2–3	Real Sociedad	Seville
20:45 CET	Mandi 16'; Pezzella (yellow card) 55'; Sanabria 65'; Joaquín (yellow card) 79'; Donk (yellow card) 90+4'; Ceballos (yellow card) 90+4'	Report	Bautista 9'; Prieto 26', 72'; Berchiche (yellow card) 40'; Illarramendi (yellow card) 78'	Stadium: Benito Villamarín; Attendance: 29,612; Referee: Ignacio Iglesias Villanueva

12 March 2017 27	Real Sociedad	0–2	Athletic Bilbao	San Sebastián
12:00 CET	Illarramendi (yellow card) 26'; I. Martínez (yellow card) 50'; Berchiche (yellow card) 77'	Report	García 28' (pen.); Muniain (yellow card) 39'; Laporte (yellow card) 50'; Williams 56'; San José (yellow card) 68'; Beñat (yellow card) 73'; Kepa (yellow card) 79'; Balenziaga (yellow card) 90'	Stadium: Anoeta; Attendance: 25,652; Referee: José María Sánchez Martínez

18 March 2017 28	Alavés	1–0	Real Sociedad	Vitoria-Gasteiz
18:30 CET	Ely (yellow card) 40'; Deyverson 44', (yellow card) 56'; M. García (yellow card) 81'	Report	Granero (yellow card) 59' (yellow-red card) 67'; Juanmi (yellow card) 70'; Vela (yellow card) 80'; Rulli (yellow card) 90+3'	Stadium: Mendizorrotza; Attendance: 17,284; Referee: Carlos del Cerro Grande

1 April 2017 29	Real Sociedad	1–1	Leganés	San Sebastián
18:30 CEST	Juanmi (yellow card) 17', (goal) 53'; Gaztañaga (yellow card) 80'	Report	Mantovani (yellow card) 25'; Szymanowski 29'; Gabriel (yellow card) 60'; Morán (yellow card) 90+2'	Stadium: Anoeta; Attendance: 18,869; Referee: Mario Melero López

5 April 2017 30	Atlético Madrid	1–0	Real Sociedad	Madrid
21:30 CEST	Filipe Luís 28'	Report	Rulli (yellow card) 61'; Berchiche (yellow card) 62'; Zubeldia (yellow card) 63'; Navas (yellow card) 68'	Stadium: Vicente Calderón; Attendance: 43,130; Referee: Alberto Undiano Mallenco

9 April 2017 31	Real Sociedad	3–1	Sporting Gijón	San Sebastián
20:45 CEST	Willian José 3'; Juanmi 27', (yellow card) 72'; Berchiche 77'	Report	Álvarez (yellow card) 17'; Vesga (yellow card) 23'; Torres (yellow card) 31'; Amorebieta (yellow card) 80'; Echiéjilé 87'; Burgui (yellow card) 90+1'	Stadium: Anoeta; Attendance: 18,894; Referee: José González González

16 April 2017 32	Barcelona	3–2	Real Sociedad	Barcelona
20:45 CEST	Messi 17', 37'; Alcácer (yellow card) 41', (goal) 44'; L. Suárez (yellow card) 68'; Piqué (yellow card) 88'	Report	Vela (yellow card) 7'; Umtiti 42' (o.g.); Prieto 45'; Illarramendi (yellow card) 49'	Stadium: Camp Nou; Attendance: 81,704; Referee: Juan Martínez Munuera

23 April 2017 33	Real Sociedad	1–0	Deportivo La Coruña	San Sebastián
12:00 CEST	Willian José 28'; Navas (yellow card) 45'	Report	Albentosa (yellow card) 44'; Fajr (yellow card) 50'; Bergantiños (yellow card) 70'	Stadium: Anoeta Stadium; Attendance: 19,851; Referee: Daniel Ocón Arráiz

26 April 2017 34	Valencia	2–3	Real Sociedad	Valencia
20:30 CEST	Siqueira (yellow card) 28'; Garay (yellow card) 29'; Zaza (yellow card) 47', (goal) 72'; Nani 68' (pen.); Cancelo (yellow card) 81'	Report	Alves 1' (o.g.); Juanmi (yellow card) 21'; Willian José 30' (pen.), (yellow card) 49'; I. Martínez (yellow card) 43'; Oyarzabal 65'	Stadium: Mestalla; Attendance: 26,101; Referee: Carlos del Cerro Grande

29 April 2017 35	Real Sociedad	2–1	Granada	San Sebastián
13:00 CEST	Vela 45'; Juanmi 84'	Report	Angban (yellow card) 42'; Ramos 65'; Ponce (yellow card) 80'; Hongla (yellow card) 87'	Stadium: Anoeta; Attendance: 18,003; Referee: Antonio Mateu Lahoz

7 May 2017 36	Sevilla	1–1	Real Sociedad	Seville
21:00 CEST	Lenglet (yellow card) 4'; Sarabia 41', (yellow card) 68'; Vázquez (yellow card) 44'; Mercado (yellow card) 58'	Report	Illarramendi (yellow card) 42'; Vela 61'; Canales (yellow card) 67'; I. Martínez (yellow card) 71'; Zurutuza (yellow card) 74' (yellow-red card) 79'	Stadium: Ramón Sánchez Pizjuán; Attendance: 28,607; Referee: José González González

14 May 2017 37	Real Sociedad	2–2	Málaga	San Sebastián
20:00 CEST	Prieto 31' (pen.); Navas (yellow card) 53'; Bautista 85'	Report	Hernández 45'; Recio 75'; Torres (yellow card) 86'; Santos (yellow card) 89'	Stadium: Anoeta; Attendance: 25,026; Referee: Santiago Jaime Latre

21 May 2017 38	Celta Vigo	2–2	Real Sociedad	Vigo
16:45 CEST	Cabral (yellow card) 28'; Roncaglia (yellow card) 42'; Aspas 54' (pen.); Hjulsager 90'	Report	Illarramendi (yellow card) 74'; Oyarzabal 82'; Juanmi 90+4'	Stadium: Balaídos; Attendance: 14,062; Referee: José María Sánchez Martínez

=== Copa del Rey ===
==== Round of 32 ====
1 December 2016 First leg	Real Valladolid	1–3	Real Sociedad	Valladolid
20:00 CET	Mata 14' (pen.), (yellow card) 89'; Ángel (yellow card) 52'	Report	I. Martínez 7'; Rulli (yellow card) 13'; Juanmi 62', 74'; Berchiche (yellow card) 79'	Stadium: José Zorrilla; Attendance: 7,280; Referee: Alejandro Hernández Hernández

20 December 2016 Second leg	Real Sociedad	1–1 (4–2 agg.)	Real Valladolid	San Sebastián
20:00 CET	Juanmi 12'	Report	González 44' (o.g.); Rafa (yellow card) 64'; Guitián (yellow card) 74'	Stadium: Anoeta; Attendance: 13,161; Referee: Alberto Undiano Mallenco

==== Round of 16 ====
4 January 2017 First leg	Real Sociedad	3–1	Villarreal	San Sebastián
19:00 CET	Willian José 17', (yellow card) 65'; Vela 33'; Oyarzabal 72'; I. Martínez (yellow card) 90+1'	Report	Trigueros 77'; José Ángel (yellow card) 87'; Castillejo (yellow card) 90+1'; Soriano (yellow card) 90+4'	Stadium: Anoeta; Attendance: 16,414; Referee: Carlos Clos Gómez

11 January 2017 Second leg	Villarreal	1–1 (2–4 agg.)	Real Sociedad	Villarreal
19:00 CET	Castillejo (yellow card) 21'; Santos Borré (yellow card) 34'; Soriano 45'; Ruiz (yellow card) 70'; Sansone (red card) 89'	Report	Oyarzabal 15'; Willian José (yellow card) 18'; Juanmi (yellow card) 70'; Illarramendi (yellow card) 86'; Gaztañaga (yellow card) 90+3'	Stadium: El Madrigal; Attendance: 14,298; Referee: David Fernández Borbalán

==== Quarter-finals ====
19 January 2017 First leg	Real Sociedad	0–1	Barcelona	San Sebastián
21:15 CET	Illarramendi (yellow card) 90+3'	Report	Neymar 21' (pen.), (yellow card) 64'; Messi (yellow card) 43'	Stadium: Anoeta; Attendance: 28,461; Referee: José Luis González González

26 January 2017 Second leg	Barcelona	5–2 (6–2 agg.)	Real Sociedad	Barcelona
21:45 CET	D. Suárez 17', 82'; Neymar (yellow card) 40'; Alba (yellow card) 40'; Messi 55' (pen.); L. Suárez (yellow card) 51', (goal) 63'; Turan 80'	Report	Vela (yellow card) 40'; Berchiche (yellow card) 43'; I. Martínez (yellow card) 54'; Juanmi 62'; Willian José 73'	Stadium: Camp Nou; Attendance: 58,560; Referee: Juan Martínez Munuera

== Statistics ==
=== Appearances and goals ===
Last updated on 21 May 2017.

No.	Pos	Nat	Player	Total		La Liga		Copa del Rey	
No.	Pos	Nat	Player	Apps	Goals	Apps	Goals	Apps	Goals
Goalkeepers
1	GK	(Argentina) ARG	Gerónimo Rulli	44	0	38	0	6	0
13	GK	(Spain) ESP	Ander Bardají	0	0	0	0	0	0
25	GK	(Spain) ESP	Toño	0	0	0	0	0	0
Defenders
2	DF	(Spain) ESP	Carlos Martínez	11	0	10	0	1	0
3	DF	(Spain) ESP	Mikel González	11	0	8+1	0	2	0
6	DF	(Spain) ESP	Iñigo Martínez	40	4	34	3	6	1
15	DF	(Spain) ESP	Aritz Elustondo	12	0	4+5	0	3	0
19	DF	(Spain) ESP	Yuri Berchiche	41	3	35	3	6	0
20	DF	(Spain) ESP	Joseba Zaldúa	17	0	12+2	0	3	0
22	DF	(Spain) ESP	Raúl Navas	35	1	31+1	1	3	0
29	DF	(Spain) ESP	Álvaro Odriozola	16	0	15	0	0+1	0
32	DF	(Portugal) POR	Kévin Rodrigues	2	0	1+1	0	0	0
Midfielders
4	MF	(Spain) ESP	Asier Illarramendi	39	1	33+1	1	5	0
5	MF	(Spain) ESP	Markel Bergara	6	0	3+3	0	0	0
8	MF	(Spain) ESP	Esteban Granero	22	0	8+11	0	0+3	0
10	MF	(Spain) ESP	Xabi Prieto	43	8	32+6	8	5	0
16	MF	(Spain) ESP	Sergio Canales	37	0	7+24	0	2+4	0
17	MF	(Spain) ESP	David Zurutuza	37	3	29+2	3	6	0
18	MF	(Spain) ESP	Mikel Oyarzabal	43	4	30+8	2	5	2
23	MF	(Spain) ESP	Jon Gaztañaga	4	0	0+2	0	0+2	0
24	MF	(Spain) ESP	David Concha	11	0	1+7	0	0+3	0
27	MF	(Spain) ESP	Igor Zubeldia	4	0	3+1	0	0	0
33	MF	(Spain) ESP	Jon Guridi	1	0	1	0	0	0
Forwards
7	FW	(Spain) ESP	Juanmi	41	15	19+16	11	2+4	4
9	FW	(Spain) ESP	Imanol Agirretxe	0	0	0	0	0	0
11	FW	(Mexico) MEX	Carlos Vela	39	10	31+4	9	4	1
12	FW	(Brazil) BRA	Willian José	34	14	27+1	12	6	2
35	FW	(Spain) ESP	Jon Bautista	13	3	2+10	3	0+1	0
Players who have made an appearance or had a squad number this season but have left the club
14	MF	(Spain) ESP	Rubén Pardo	4	0	2+1	0	1	0
21	DF	(Spain) ESP	Héctor	4	0	2+2	0	0	0
