= 2011–12 Real Sociedad season =

Real Sociedad
2011–12 season
- President: Jokin Aperribay
- Head coach: Philippe Montanier
- Stadium: Anoeta
- La Liga: 12th
- Copa del Rey: Round of 16
- Top goalscorer: League: Carlos Vela (12); All: Vela-Agirretxe (12)
Home colours	Away colours

The 2011–12 season was Real Sociedad's 66th season in La Liga. After managing to stay up in the previous season the Basque club sacked Martín Lasarte and appointed Philippe Montanier as a new coach.

This article shows player statistics and all matches (official and friendly) that the club played during the 2011–12 season.

== Season summary ==
Real Sociedad's progression during the 2011–12 season.

The Season started with the appointment of Philippe Montanier as a coach, and promises from the local media of a new ball-playing approach. The new campaign got off to a good start as Real Sociedad won its first game, away to Sporting Gijón. This optimism would not last, as the club found itself bottom of the table by late November. Talk of Montanier's imminent dismissal became overwhelming but two unexpected victories kept the Frenchman in the job. The first, away against Real Betis, was sealed in extra time when Iñigo Martínez shot from midfield, surprising the goalkeeper. This goal became a hit throughout Europe and was nominated as one of the goals of the season. The second victory, against Malaga, was obtained in extra-time too. It is widely accepted that without these two wins Montanier would have been sacked.

Towards the end of 2011 the Basque club stabilized in higher positions and relegation looked unlikely as Sporting Gijon, Racing Santander and Real Zaragoza looked already doomed. On the 36th round Real Sociedad mathematically avoided an unlikely relegation after defeating Racing Santander at home. The club finished in 12th position, with 47 points. Despite the improvement from the previous season and acceptable point tally, criticism of Montanier was widespread. Sections of the media and fans were disappointed in the style of play and Montanier's alleged lack of ambition. During a home game against Real Betis, a number of fans called for Montanier's resignation while the game was in play, and the score was 1–1.

=== Copa del Rey ===
In the cup the club met Granada. A home win was enough to knock the Andalusians out, despite being beaten and thoroughly outplayed in the second leg. Similarly, Mallorca were beaten at Anoeta, but a catastrophic second leg sent Real Sociedad out the competition after being defeated 6–1.

=== Others ===
Real Sociedad reached an agreement with Nike, who became the official suppliers of the team's kit and training clothing. Thus Real Sociedad ended a 17-year relationship with basque kit providers Astore

== Players ==
=== Squad information ===
Note: Flags indicate national team as defined under FIFA eligibility rules; some limited exceptions apply. Players may hold more than one non-FIFA nationality.

No.	Pos.	Nation	Player
1	GK	CHI	Claudio Bravo
2	DF	ESP	Carlos Martínez
3	DF	ESP	Mikel González
4	MF	ESP	Gorka Elustondo
5	MF	ESP	Markel Bergara
7	MF	FRA	Antoine Griezmann
8	FW	ESP	Joseba Llorente
9	FW	ESP	Imanol Agirretxe
10	MF	ESP	Xabier Prieto
11	MF	ESP	Mikel Aranburu (captain)
13	GK	ESP	Eñaut Zubikarai
14	MF	NED	Jeffrey Sarpong
15	DF	ESP	Ion Ansotegi

No.	Pos.	Nation	Player
16	DF	NOR	Vadim Demidov
17	MF	FRA	David Zurutuza
18	MF	KEN	McDonald Mariga
19	MF	ALG	Liassine Cadamuro-Bentaïba
20	MF	ESP	Asier Illarramendi
21	FW	URU	Diego Ifrán
22	DF	ESP	Dani Estrada
23	FW	MEX	Carlos Vela
24	DF	ESP	Alberto de la Bella
25	GK	ESP	Toño Ramírez
26	DF	ESP	Iñigo Martínez
27	MF	ESP	Rubén Pardo

== Start formations ==
Starting XI

Lineup that started most of the club's competitive matches throughout the season.

No.	Pos.	Nat.	Name	MS	Notes
1	GK	(Chile)	Claudio Bravo	37	
2	RB	(Spain)	Carlos Martínez	19	Estrada started 16 games as RB
26	CB	(Spain)	Iñigo Martínez	26	Missed the last 8 games due to injury
3	CB	(Spain)	Mikel González	25	Demidov and Ansotegi shared the remaining games
24	LB	(Spain)	Alberto de la Bella	21	Cadamuro-Bentaïba started 11 games as LB
4	MF	(Spain)	Gorka Elustondo	16	Illarramendi played 16 games too
11	MF	(Spain)	Mikel Aranburu	26	
10	AM	(Spain)	Xabi Prieto	25	Sometimes on the left
17	AM	(France)	David Zurutuza	30	
7	FW	(France)	Antoine Griezmann	28	Sometimes on the right
9	FW	(Spain)	Imanol Agirretxe	27	

The formation above is not the standard lineup during the season. It is unclear whether the team played 4–3–3 or 4–2–3–1. Griezmann and Prieto often switched sides. Carlos Vela played in different attacking positions: wide left, off the striker and as a false nine. Cadamuro-Bentaïba was used as left-back instead of De la Bella as the latter was absent for a long period due to technical decisions and injuries.

The season was marked by the lack of a defined best 11, with constant changes that were not always understood by the local media and fans.

== Player stats ==
Squad stats
Nr.	Player	Games played	Starting	Sub	Subbed	Mins played	Goals	Pens. Won	Pens. Comm.	Fouls suff.	Fouls comm.	Yellow C	Red c	Assists	Passes	Good passes
27	Griezmann	35	28	7	7	2739	7	1	0	29	37	5	0	37	1051	709
17	Zurutuza	33	30	3	12	2618	3	0	0	62	58	4	0	30	1467	1145
	Carlos Vela	35	28	7	15	2573	12	0	0	75	40	2	0	37	1009	730
10	Xabi Prieto	34	25	9	6	2411	2	0	0	59	20	1	0	35	1311	949
22	Estrada	29	25	4	6	2356	2	0	0	25	22	8	0	12	1363	985
3	Mikel González	28	25	3	1	2311	1	0	0	6	25	9	1	3	905	738
	Iñigo Martínez	26	26	0	1	2310	3	0	2	27	38	10	2	6	1086	840
9	Agirretxe	36	27	9	20	2287	10	0	0	45	29	1	0	21	625	389
11	Aranburu	29	26	3	12	2239	2	0	0	33	18	3	0	15	910	702
	Demidov	23	20	3	2	1922	0	0	1	19	11	5	0	1	653	508
24	De la Bella	21	21	0	1	1906	0	0	0	12	16	4	0	18	1019	776
2	Carlos Martínez	21	19	2	2	1763	0	0	1	35	11	2	1	18	972	683
4	Elustondo	17	16	1	2	1461	1	0	0	12	20	6	2	4	691	528
	Illarramendi	18	16	2	6	1456	0	0	0	29	26	3	1	15	779	608
	Cadamuro-Bentaïba	19	13	6	3	1294	0	0	0	13	20	6	0	12	622	453
	Mariga	14	10	4	3	999	0	0	0	12	16	1	0	6	444	356
15	Ansotegi	9	8	1	0	776	0	0	0	7	5	2	0	1	258	199
5	Bergara	11	9	2	4	728	0	0	0	8	12	4	0	2	309	242
21	Diego Ifrán	16	4	12	3	526	1	0	0	12	8	4	0	3	105	59
	Rubén Pardo	15	2	13	2	390	1	0	0	3	7	0	0	9	188	141
8	Joseba Llorente	17	1	16	0	336	0	0	0	2	7	4	0	1	76	49
	Sarpong	3	1	2	1	95	0	0	0	1	1	0	0	2	43	29
	Javi Ros	0	0	0	0	0	0	0	0	0	0	0	0	0	0	0

=== Goalkeepers ===
Goalkeeper stats
Dorsal	Jugadores	Games played	Starting	Sub.	Substituted	Minutes played	Goals	Saves	Penalties committed	Fouls received	Fouls committed	Yellow cards	Red cards
1	Bravo	37	37	0	0	3487	51	134	0	0	3	3	1
13	Zubikarai	1	1	0	0	93	1	5	0	0	0	1	0
	Toño	0	0	0	0	0	0	0	0	0	0	0	0

== Transfers ==
Martín Lasarte had his contract rescinded by the club almost immediately after the end of the season, being paid €50,000 for it. After some speculation Philippe Montanier was appointed as new coach, for which Valenciennes received €500,000 from Real Sociedad.

Controversially Diego Rivas was not offered a new contract and abandoned the club. Similarly Raul Tamudo left the club after a successful one-year stay. Experienced centre-half Mikel Labaka signed for Rayo Vallecano on a free transfer, ending a 14-year-long relationship with the club. Sutil was let go to Real Murcia after a season spent mostly on the bench.

Young prospects Borja Viguera, Alex Albistegi and Iñigo Sarasola returned to the club at the end of their loan spells. Iosu Esnaola signed for Noja and Sarasola and Albistegi had their contracts rescinded. Albistegi signed for Logroñes later that summer.

=== Out ===
Player	New Team	Fee
(Spain) Diego Rivas	(Spain) Hércules CF	Free, end of contract.
(Spain) Raúl Tamudo	(Spain) Rayo Vallecano	Free, end of contract.
(Spain) Iñigo Sarasola		Contract rescinded
(Spain) Iosu Esnaola	(Spain) SD Noja	Free
(Spain) Francisco Sutil	(Spain) Real Murcia	Free, contract rescided
(Spain) Alex Albistegi	(Spain) Logroñés	Free, contract rescided
(Spain) Mikel Labaka	(Spain) Rayo Vallecano	Free, contract rescinded

=== Loan out ===
Player	Team
(Spain) Borja Viguera	(Spain) Gimnàstic de Tarragona
(Netherlands) Jeffrey Sarpong	(Netherlands) NAC Breda

Jeffrey Sarpong was loaned to Dutch club NAC Breda in the winter transfer window.

=== Loan return ===
Player	From
(Spain) Borja Viguera	(Spain) Gimnàstic de Tarragona, (who rescinded Viguera's contract in January)
(Spain) Iñigo Sarasola	(Spain) Real Unión
(Spain) Iosu Esnaola	(Spain) Real Unión, UD Lanzarote (April onwards)
(Spain) Alex Albistegi	(Spain) Eibar

=== Loan in ===
Player	From
(Mexico) Carlos Vela	(England) Arsenal
(Kenya) McDonald Mariga	(Italy) Internazionale

=== Loan end ===
Player	To
(Kenya) McDonald Mariga	(Italy) Internazionale

McDonald Mariga, who had been signed on loan for a season from Inter Milan, returned to Italy during the winter window after a series of disappointing performances for Real Sociedad. Inter Milan loaned the Kenian again, this time to Parma.

== Pre-season ==
16 July 2011 Friendly	Beasain (Spain)	0–3	Real Sociedad	Beasain
18:00 CET		(Report)	14' Ifrán; 58', 74' Agirretxe	Stadium: Loinaz Stadium; Referee: Andoni Labaka

23 July 2011 Friendly	Real Sociedad	4–0	(France) Ajaccio	Azpeitia, Spain
18:00 CEST	Labaka 38'; Agirretxe 45' (pen.); Sutil 66', 89' (pen.)	(Report)		Stadium: Garmendipe; Referee: Pérez Lasa

30 July 2011 Friendly	Toulouse (France)	1–0	Real Sociedad	Dax, Landes, France
19:00 CEST	Tabanou 71'; Fofana (yellow card) 60'	(Report)	(yellow card) 70' Cadamuro-Bentaïba	Stadium: Stade Maurice Boyau; Referee: Dos Santos

7 August 2011 Friendly	Pescara (Italy)	2–2	Real Sociedad	Pescara, Italy
20:45 CEST	Insigne 6'; Soddimo 68'	(Report)	9' Zurutuza; 76' Sarpong	Stadium: Stadio Adriatico; Referee: Danilo Giannocaro

9 August 2011 Friendly	A.S. Bari (Italy)	1–0	Real Sociedad	Verona, Italy
17:30 CEST	Marotta 70'; Borghese (yellow card) 80'	(Report)	Llorente (yellow card) 80'	Stadium: Stadio Marcantonio Bentegodi; Referee: Guida de Torrenunziata

11 August 2011 Friendly	Lazio (Italy)	2–0	Real Sociedad	Rome, Italy
21:00 CEST	Cissé 3'; Sculli 70'; Hernanes (yellow card) 84'; Kozák (yellow card) 86'	(report)	(yellow card) 77' Illarramendi	Stadium: Stadio Olimpico; Referee: Luca Banti

13 August 2011 Friendly	Catania (Italy)	1–2	Real Sociedad	Catania
--:-- CEST	Potenza 36'	(Report)	30' (o.g.) Spolli; 80' Sarpong	Stadium: Stadio Angelo Massimino; Referee: Daniele Doveri

== League ==
Win Draw Loss Postponed

27 August 2011 2	Sporting Gijón	1–2	Real Sociedad	Gijón
18:00 CEST (UTC+02)	De las Cuevas 68' (pen.), (yellow card) 51'; Lora (yellow card) 44' (yellow-red card) 90'; Barral (yellow card) 90'	(Report)	35', 65' Agirretxe; (red card) 68' C. Martínez; (yellow card) 85' Aranburu	Stadium: El Molinón; Attendance: 18,000; Referee: Jose Luis Paradas Romero

10 September 2011 3	Real Sociedad	2–2	Barcelona	San Sebastián
18:00 CEST (UTC+02)	Agirretxe 59'; Griezmann 60'; Zurutuza (yellow card) 61'; Cadamuro-Bentaïba (yellow card) 82'	(Report)	10' Xavi; 11' Fàbregas; (yellow card) 90' Messi	Stadium: Anoeta; Referee: Antonio Miguel Mateu Lahoz

17 September 2011 4	Sevilla	1–0	Real Sociedad	Seville
22:00 CEST (UTC+02)	Kanouté 53'; Coke (yellow card) 30'; Escudé (yellow card) 45'; Spahić (yellow card) 88'	(Report)	(yellow card) 6' Mariga; (yellow card) 66' De la Bella	Stadium: Estadio Ramón Sánchez Pizjuán; Referee: José Antonio Teixeira

21 September 2011 5	Real Sociedad	1–0	Granada	San Sebastián
20:00 CEST (UTC+02)	Estrada 64' (yellow card) 58'; Agirretxe (yellow card) 17'; Griezmann (yellow card) 77'; Illarramendi (yellow card) 78'; I. Martínez (yellow card) 78'	(Report)	(yellow card) 32' Siqueira; (yellow card) 54' Jara	Stadium: Anoeta; Referee: Alfonso Alvarez Izquierdo

25 September 2011 6	Mallorca	2–1	Real Sociedad	Palma, Majorca
12:00 CEST (UTC+02)	Víctor 20'; Castro 50'; Cáceres (yellow card) 4'; Pina (yellow card) 59'	(Report)	15' Agirretxe	Stadium: Son Moix; Referee: Miguel Ángel Ayza Gámez

2 October 2011 7	Real Sociedad	1–2	Athletic Bilbao	San Sebastián
12:00 CEST (UTC+02)	I. Martínez 61'; Illarramendi (yellow card) 68'	(Report)	34', 70' Llorente; (yellow card) 49' Amorebieta; (yellow card) 72' Iraola; (yellow card) 75' Gurpegui; (yellow card) 84' Susaeta	Stadium: Anoeta; Referee: David Fernández Borbalán

16 October 2011 8	Real Zaragoza	2–0	Real Sociedad	Zaragoza
16:00 CEST (UTC+02)	Postiga 11', 49'; García (yellow card) 16'; Ponzio (yellow card) 26'; Lafita (yellow card) 65'	(Report)	(yellow card) 23' I. Martínez; (yellow card) 57' C. Martínez; (yellow card) 58' Aranburu	Stadium: La Romareda; Referee: Pedro Jesús Pérez Montero

23 October 2011 9	Real Sociedad	0–0	Getafe	San Sebastián
16:00 CEST (UTC+02)	Ifrán (yellow card) 23'; Zurutuza (yellow card) 83'	(Report)	(yellow card) 60' Torres	Stadium: Anoeta; Referee: Javier Estrada Fernández

26 October 2011 10	Levante	3–2	Real Sociedad	Valencia, Spain
	Nano 56'; Valdo 61', (yellow card) 38'; Rubén 90', (yellow card) 90'; Koné (yellow card) 19'; Juanfran (yellow card) 90'; Munúa (yellow card) 90'	(Report)	4' Estrada; 86' I. Martínez; (yellow card) 77' De la Bella	Stadium: Estadi Ciutat de València; Referee: Ignacio Iglesias Villanueva

29 October 2011 11	Real Sociedad	0–1	Real Madrid	San Sebastián
22:00 CEST (UTC+02)	Cadamuro-Bentaïba (yellow card) 47'; Griezmann (yellow card) 69'; C. Martínez (yellow card) 84'; Bergara (yellow card) 86'; I. Martínez (yellow card) 90'	(Report)	9' Higuaín; (yellow card) 11' Arbeloa; (yellow card) 82' Ramos	Stadium: Anoeta; Referee: Alberto Undiano Mallenco

6 November 2011 12	Rayo Vallecano	4–0	Real Sociedad	Vallecas
18:00 CEST (UTC+02)	Piti 12' (pen.); Michu 49', 62'; Trashorras 72'; Jordi (yellow card) 57'	(Report)	(red card) 12' I. Martínez; (yellow card) 57' Estrada	Stadium: Estadio Teresa Rivero; Referee: César Muñiz Fernández

20 November 13	Real Sociedad	0–0	Espanyol	San Sebastián
12:00 CEST (UTC+02)	Llorente (yellow card) 42'; Cadamuro-Bentaïba (yellow card) 46'; Ansotegi (yellow card) 57'; Illarramendi (yellow card) 64'	(Report)	(yellow card) 30' Dídac	Stadium: Anoeta; Referee: Carlos Del Cerro Grande

27 November 2011 14	Real Betis	2–3	Real Sociedad	Seville
12:00 CEST (UTC+02)	Pereira 81', 85'; Casto (yellow card) 22'; Beñat (yellow card) 28'; Iriney (yellow card) 74'	(Report)	56' Agirretxe; 76' Vela; 90', (yellow card) 90' I. Martínez; (yellow card) 56' González; (yellow card) 58' Griezmann	Stadium: Estadio Benito Villamarín; Referee: Alfonso Alvarez Izquierdo

4 December 2011 15	Real Sociedad	3–2	Málaga	San Sebastián
16:00 CEST (UTC+02)	Demichelis 10' (o.g.); Vela 89'; Ifrán 90', (yellow card) 90'; Griezmann (yellow card) 76'	(Report)	20' Rondón; 59' Fernández; (yellow card) 24' Isco; (yellow card) 38' Monreal; (yellow card) 63' Sánchez	Stadium: Anoeta; Referee: Javier Turienzo Álvarez

11 December 2011 16	Villarreal	1–1	Real Sociedad	Villarreal
16:00 CEST (UTC+02)	Ruben 72'; Zapata (yellow card) 58'; Oriol (yellow card) 61'	(Report)	52' Aranburu; (yellow card) 2' González; (yellow card) 11' Zurutuza; (yellow card) 34' (red card) 62' Elustondo	Stadium: Estadio El Madrigal; Referee: Alberto Undiano Mallenco

18 December 2011 17	Racing Santander	0–0	Real Sociedad	Santander
19:45 CEST (UTC+02)	Adrián (yellow card) 26'; Colsa (yellow card) 29'; Bernando (yellow card) 32'; Stuani (yellow card) 45'; Cisma (yellow card) 59'	(Report)	(yellow card) 45' Demidov; (yellow card) 45' (red card) 54' I. Martínez; (yellow card) 90' Bravo	Stadium: Estadio El Sardinero; Referee: Carlos Velasco Carballo

7 January 2012 18	Real Sociedad	0–0	Osasuna	San Sebastián
18:00 CEST (UTC+02)		(Report)	(yellow card) 21' Puñal; (yellow card) 69' Satrustegi	Stadium: Anoeta; Referee: Fernando Teixeira Vitienes

14 January 2012 19	Valencia	0–1	Real Sociedad	Valencia
22:00 CEST (UTC+02)	Alba (yellow card) 54'	(Report)	56' Griezmann	Stadium: Mestalla

21 January 2012 1	Real Sociedad	0–4	Atlético Madrid	San Sebastián
20:00 CEST (UTC+02)	Demidov (yellow card) 2'; Aranburu (yellow card) 12'; Zubikarai (yellow card) 13'; González (yellow card) 71'	(Report)	3', 83', 90', (yellow card) 88' Falcao; (yellow card) 25' Miranda; (yellow card) 29' Suárez; (yellow card) 59' Gabi; (yellow card) 62' Filipe Luís; (yellow card) 67' Juanfran; (yellow card) 71' Diego	Stadium: Anoeta; Referee: César Muñiz Fernández

29 January 2012 21	Real Sociedad	5–1	Sporting Gijón	San Sebastián
5–1	Zurutuza 2', 3'; Elustondo 75'; Aranburu 90+2'; Griezmann 90+3'	Summary	(yellow card) 32' Rivera; 46' De las Cuevas; (yellow card) 52' Carmelo; (yellow card) 56' Botía; (yellow card) 69' Gálvez	Stadium: Anoeta; Attendance: 22,081; Referee: José Luis González González

4 February 2012 22	Barcelona	2–1	Real Sociedad	Barcelona
22:00 CET (UTC+01)	Tello 9'; Messi 72'	Summary	(yellow card) 34' I. Martínez; 73' Vela; (yellow card) 88' Llorente	Stadium: Camp Nou; Attendance: 92,000; Referee: Carlos Clos Gomez

13 February 2012 23	Real Sociedad	2–0	Sevilla	San Sebastián
21:00 CET (UTC+01)	I. Martínez (yellow card) 56'; Vela 65'; Pardo 69'	Summary	(yellow card) 58' Manu; (yellow card) 88' Trochowski	Stadium: Anoeta; Attendance: 25,000; Referee: Ignacio Iglesias

19 February 2012 24	Granada	4–1	Real Sociedad	Granada
12:00 CET (UTC+01)	López 12' (yellow card) 45+2'; Rico (yellow card) 45+1'; Siqueira (yellow card) 49' (yellow-red card) 86'; Jara 57'; Uche 62', 87'	Report	10' González; (yellow card) 14' Lorente; (yellow card) 15' I. Martínez; (red card) 45' Illarramendi; (yellow card) 77' Cadamuro-Bentaïba; (yellow card) 78' Ifrán	Stadium: Estadio Nuevo Los Cármenes; Attendance: 21,000; Referee: Fernando Teixeira Vitienes

26 February 2012 25	Real Sociedad	1–0	Mallorca	San Sebastián
18:00 CET (UTC+01)	Bergara (yellow card) 59'; Agirretxe 79'; Llorente (yellow card) 90+2'	Summary	(yellow card) 53' Tissone; (yellow card) 60' Martí; (yellow card) 60' Pereira; (yellow card) 90' Ramis	Stadium: Anoeta; Attendance: 25,000; Referee: José Luis Paradas Romero

4 March 2012 26	Athletic Bilbao	2–0	Real Sociedad	Bilbao
16:00 CET (UTC+01)	Martínez (yellow card) 22'; Susaeta 25', 81', (yellow card) 73'; Amorebieta (yellow card) 62'; San José (yellow card) 66'	Report	(yellow card) 34' Zurutuza; (yellow card) 38' Bergara; (yellow card) 73' Vela; (yellow card) 77' Cadamuro-Bentaïba; (yellow card) 80' González; (yellow card) 84' Estrada	Stadium: San Mamés Stadium; Attendance: 38,000; Referee: Antonio Miguel Mateu Lahoz

10 March 2012 27	Real Sociedad	3–0	Real Zaragoza	San Sebastián
18:00 CET (UTC+01)	Agirretxe 19', 40'; Vela 22'; González (yellow card) 24'; Estrada (yellow card) 62'	Report	(yellow card) 6' (yellow-red card) 84' Lanzaro; (yellow card) 64' Álvarez	Stadium: Anoeta; Attendance: 23,550; Referee: Carlos Velasco Carballo

17 March 2012 28	Getafe	1–0	Real Sociedad	Getafe
18:00 CET (UTC+01)	Rafa (yellow card) 34'; Míchel (yellow card) 45'; Valera (yellow card) 80'; I. Martínez 81' (o.g.); Castro (yellow card) 90'	Report	(yellow card) 11' Bergara; (yellow card) 54' Griezmann; (yellow card) 90' Demidov; (yellow card) 90+2' Cadamuro-Bentaïba	Stadium: Coliseum Alfonso Pérez; Attendance: 11,000; Referee: David Fernandez Borbalan

21 March 2012 29	Real Sociedad	1–3	Levante	San Sebastián
20:00 CET (UTC+01)	Vela 6'; Elustondo (yellow card) 28' (yellow-red card) 57'; Estrada (yellow card) 53'; González (yellow card) 90+1'	Report	12' (pen.), (yellow card) 85' Barkero; (yellow card) 41' Navarro; 45' Koné; (yellow card) 54' Farinós; (yellow card) 59' Botelho; (yellow card) 76' López; (yellow card) 77' Juanfran; 90+4' Torres	Stadium: Anoeta; Attendance: 20,722; Referee: Alfonso Alvarez Izquierdo

24 March 2012 30	Real Madrid	5–1	Real Sociedad	Madrid
20:00 CET (UTC+01)	Higuaín 6'; Ronaldo 33', 56'; Benzema 41', 49'; Alonso (yellow card) 45+1'	Report	(yellow card) 23' I. Martínez; (yellow card) 38' González; (yellow card) 40' De la Bella; 42' Prieto; (yellow card) 85' Demidov	Stadium: Santiago Bernabéu Stadium; Attendance: 76,000; Referee: Javier Turienzo Álvarez

1 April 2012 31	Real Sociedad	4–0	Rayo Vallecano	San Sebastián
21:30 CET (UTC+01)	Agirretxe 6'; Zurutuza 31'; Griezmann 51'; Vela 53'; Ansotegi (yellow card) 69'	Report	(yellow card) 13' Diamanka; (yellow card) 65' Costa; (yellow card) 75' Casado	Stadium: Anoeta; Attendance: 20,000; Referee: Pedro Jesús Pérez Montero

7 April 2012 32	Espanyol	2–2	Real Sociedad	Cornellà de Llobregat
18:00 CET (UTC+01)	Rodríguez (yellow card) 20'; García (yellow card) 41'; Demidov 45+1' (o.g.); Weiss 47', (yellow card) 90+4'; Moreno (yellow card) 87'	Report	12', 15' Vela; (yellow card) 32' Estrada; (yellow card) 57' Prieto; (yellow card) 68' De la Bella; (yellow card) 90+3' Bravo	Stadium: Estadi Cornellà-El Prat; Attendance: 18,000; Referee: César Muñiz Fernández

10 April 2012 33	Real Sociedad	1–1	Real Betis	San Sebastián
20:00 CET (UTC+01)	Vela 56'	Report	(yellow card) 39' Cañas; (yellow card) 50', (goal) 70' Castro; (yellow card) 61' Chica	Stadium: Anoeta; Attendance: 24,000; Referee: Antonio Miguel Mateu Lahoz

15 April 2012 34	Málaga	1–1	Real Sociedad	Málaga
16:00 CET (UTC+01)	Isco 19'; Mathijsen (yellow card) 89'; Demichelis (yellow card) 90+1'	Report	(yellow card) 26' (yellow-red card) 45' González; 49' Prieto	Stadium: Estadio La Rosaleda; Attendance: 28,000; Referee: José Luis González González

22 April 2012 35	Real Sociedad	1–1	Villarreal	San Sebastián
12:00 CET (UTC+01)	Vela 86'; Estrada (yellow card) 57'; Demidov (yellow card) 64'; Elustondo (yellow card) 64'	Report	42' Senna; (yellow card) 23' Catalá; (yellow card) 70' Cani	Stadium: Anoeta; Attendance: 18,000; Referee: David Fernandez Borbalan

28 April 2012 36	Real Sociedad	3–0	Racing Santander	San Sebastián
18:00 CET (UTC+01)	Griezmann 47', 70'; Agirretxe 83'; Ifrán (yellow card) 89'	Report	Acosta (yellow card) 38'; Torrejón (yellow card) 49'; Adrián (yellow card) 70'; Munitis (yellow card) 74'; Álvaro (yellow card) 79'	Stadium: Anoeta; Attendance: 20,000; Referee: Javier Estrada Fernández

2 May 2012 20	Atlético Madrid	1–1	Real Sociedad	Madrid
18:00 CET (UTC+01)	Suárez (yellow card) 23'; Gabi 54', (yellow card) 58' (yellow-red card) 73'; Falcao (yellow card) 83'	Report	Zurutuza (yellow card) 50'; Vela 90+1'	Stadium: Vicente Calderón Stadium; Attendance: 40,000; Referee: Ignacio Iglesias

5 May 2012 37	Osasuna	1–0	Real Sociedad	Pamplona
21:00 CET (UTC+01)	Baldé 14'; García (yellow card) 27'; Bertrán (yellow card) 67'; Flaño (yellow card) 76'; Puñal (yellow card) 81'; Satrústegui (yellow card) 90'	Report	Elustondo (yellow card) 39'	Stadium: Reyno de Navarra; Attendance: 17,394; Referee: José Antonio Teixeira Vitienes

12 May 2012 38	Real Sociedad	1–0	Valencia	San Sebastián
20:00 CET (UTC+01)	Estrada (yellow card) 47'; Vela (yellow card) 53'; Griezmann 64'	Report		Stadium: Anoeta; Attendance: 24,000; Referee: Pedro Jesús Pérez Montero

== King's cup ==
=== Round of 32 ===
13 December 2011 Round of 32	Real Sociedad	4–1	Granada	San Sebastián
21:00 CET	Griezmann 4'; Prieto 7', 63'; Ifrán 90'	(Report)	Geijo 72'	Stadium: Anoeta; Attendance: 18,000; Referee: Miguel Ángel Ayza Gámez

21 December 2011 Round of 32	Granada	2–1 (3–5 agg.)	Real Sociedad	Granada
21:00 CET	Siqueira 19' (pen.); Geijo 66'	(Report)	Agirretxe 83'	Stadium: Nuevo Los Cármenes; Attendance: 18,000; Referee: Antonio Miguel Mateu Lahoz

=== Round of 16 ===
4 January 2012 Round of 16	Real Sociedad	2–0	Mallorca	San Sebastián
20:00 CET	Aranburu 17'; Agirretxe 55'	(Report)		Stadium: Anoeta; Attendance: 23,000; Referee: José Luis Paradas Romero

10 January 2012 Round of 16	Mallorca	6–1 (6–3 agg.)	Real Sociedad	Palma de Mallorca
20:00 CET	Castro 34', 41'; Hemed 36', 59'; Nunes 38'; Alfaro 53'	(Report)	Ifrán 16'	Stadium: Iberostar Stadium; Attendance: 6,500; Referee: Miguel Ángel Ayza Gámez
