= Imanol Agirretxe =

Spanish footballer (born 1987)

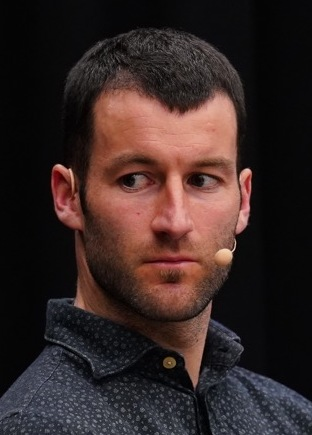
- Agirretxe in 2020

Personal information
- Full name: Imanol Agirretxe Arruti
- Date of birth: 24 February 1987 (age 39)
- Place of birth: Usurbil, Spain
- Height: 1.87 m (6 ft 2 in)
- Position: Striker

Team information
- Current team: Real Sociedad B (assistant)

Youth career
- 1996–2001: Antiguoko
- 2001–2003: Athletic Bilbao
- 2003–2004: Real Sociedad

Senior career*
Years	Team	Apps	(Gls)
2004–2008	Real Sociedad B	108	(33)
2005–2018	Real Sociedad	246	(71)
2007	→ Castellón (loan)	8	(1)
Total		362	(105)

International career
2003	Spain U16	3	(4)
2004–2005	Spain U17	7	(0)
2010–2015	Basque Country	5	(3)

Managerial career
- 2025–: Real Sociedad B (assistant)
- * Club domestic league appearances and goals

Imanol Agirretxe Arruti (born 24 February 1987) is a Spanish former professional footballer who played as a striker. He is currently assistant manager of Real Sociedad B.

Aside from a short loan spell at Castellón, his entire professional career was spent at Real Sociedad. At the latter club, he amassed competitive totals of 272 matches and 75 goals, while in La Liga alone he scored 56 times from 180 appearances.

== Club career ==
Born in Usurbil, Gipuzkoa, Agirretxe was a product of Real Sociedad's youth system, arriving at age 16 from neighbouring Athletic Bilbao. He first appeared with the first team in 2004–05, making three substitute appearances; in his second, a 1–3 home loss against Málaga on 15 May 2005, he managed to score after just 16 minutes on the pitch. In the following three seasons, however, he only totalled nine league matches, and also served a six-month loan spell at Castellón in the Segunda División.

In 2008–09's second tier, Agirretxe appeared regularly for the main squad, mainly due to the serious injury to Iñigo Díaz de Cerio. He netted nine goals in 28 games, but the Basques again failed to return to La Liga.

Again mainly a backup after the signing on loan of Uruguayan Carlos Bueno, Agirretxe scored six times the following campaign in 36 matches, as Real finally promoted as champions. In 2011–12, following Raúl Tamudo's departure and the continuous physical problems that bothered Joseba Llorente, he was finally made first-choice, and netted three goals in his first two league games, two against Sporting de Gijón in a 2–1 away win and one against Barcelona, helping the hosts come from behind 2–0 for an eventual 2–2 draw; he finished with ten successful strikes, only trailing Carlos Vela in the squad.

Agirretxe came from the bench for the last six minutes of a home fixture against Barcelona on 19 January 2013, and scored in the last minute to seal a 3–2 comeback victory (Real Sociedad trailed 2–0 in the 40th minute) and end the Catalans' unbeaten domestic run. At the season's end he again finished second in team scoring (13), again only behind Vela.

At the start of the 2015–16 campaign, Agirretxe was in the best form of his career, scoring 12 times in the first 13 league matches. He suffered an injury to his left ankle during a loss to Real Madrid at the Santiago Bernabéu Stadium on 30 December 2015, and returned sooner than expected the following February, netting in a 1–1 home draw against Málaga after only seven minutes on the pitch. Shortly after, however, he relapsed from his ailment, going on to be sidelined for more than one year; in June 2016, while absent from playing, he renewed his contract until summer 2020.

After impressing in the 2017–18 pre-season, Agirretxe made a return to competitive action on 19 August 2017 following a 20-month hiatus, replacing captain Xabi Prieto as their team came from behind to defeat hosts Celta de Vigo 3–2 in the opening round of league fixtures. He made 13 appearances in all competitions, but only played more than 45 minutes in two of them.

Agirretxe announced his retirement on 29 August 2018 at the age of 31, having never fully recovered from his 2015 injury. In a press conference, he expressed that it was "A very happy day", reflecting on his satisfaction in the decision he had made after his long struggles to return to peak condition, also speaking of his pride in representing Real Sociedad and respect he had for the staff at the club.

Agirretxe returned to Real Sociedad in May 2025, being named assistant manager of Iosu Rivas at the reserves.

== International career ==
Agirretxe earned caps for the Basque Country autonomous team.

== Career statistics ==
Appearances and goals by club, season and competition
Club	Season	League			Cup		Continental (Note: Includes UEFA Champions League and UEFA Europa League)		Other (Note: Includes Segunda División B play-offs)		Total	
Club	Season	Division	Apps	Goals	Apps	Goals	Apps	Goals	Apps	Goals	Apps	Goals
Real Sociedad B	2004–05	Segunda División B	23	7	–		–		–		23	7
Real Sociedad B	2005–06	Segunda División B	34	12	–		–		2	0	36	12
Real Sociedad B	2006–07	Segunda División B	12	3	–		–		–		12	3
Real Sociedad B	2007–08	Segunda División B	30	9	–		–		–		30	9
Real Sociedad B	2008–09	Segunda División B	9	1	–		–		–		9	1
Real Sociedad B	Total		108	33	–		–		2	0	110	33
Castellón	2006–07	Segunda División	8	1	0	0	–		–		23	7
Real Sociedad	2004–05	La Liga	3	1	0	0	–		–		3	1
Real Sociedad	2005–06	La Liga	1	0	1	0	–		–		2	0
Real Sociedad	2006–07	La Liga	6	0	0	0	–		–		6	0
Real Sociedad	2007–08	La Liga	2	0	0	0	–		–		2	0
Real Sociedad	2008–09	Segunda División	28	9	0	0	–		–		28	9
Real Sociedad	2009–10	Segunda División	36	6	1	0	–		–		37	6
Real Sociedad	2010–11	La Liga	11	3	2	1	–		–		13	4
Real Sociedad	2011–12	La Liga	36	10	3	2	–		–		39	12
Real Sociedad	2012–13	La Liga	34	14	2	1	–		–		36	15
Real Sociedad	2013–14	La Liga	31	8	3	0	6	0	–		40	8
Real Sociedad	2014–15	La Liga	31	7	2	0	4	0	–		37	7
Real Sociedad	2015–16	La Liga	16	13	0	0	0	0	–		16	13
Real Sociedad	2016–17	La Liga	0	0	0	0	0	0	–		0	0
Real Sociedad	2017–18	La Liga	11	0	0	0	2	0	–		13	0
Real Sociedad	Total		246	71	14	4	12	0	0	0	273	75
Career total			362	105	14	4	12	0	2	0	390	109

== Honours ==
Real Sociedad

- Segunda División: 2009–10
