= Aitor Núñez =

Spanish footballer

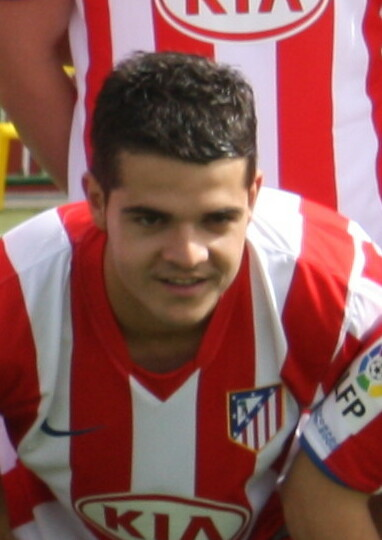
- Núñez with Atlético Madrid B in 2009

Personal information
- Full name: Aitor Salvador Núñez Martín
- Date of birth: 2 October 1987 (age 39)
- Place of birth: Madrid, Spain
- Height: 1.77 m (5 ft 9 1/2 in)
- Position: Right-back

Youth career
- Rayo Majadahonda

Senior career*
Years	Team	Apps	(Gls)
2007–2009	Atlético Madrid B	61	(0)
2009–2011	Tenerife	7	(0)
2011–2012	Rayo Vallecano B	26	(1)
2012	Rayo Vallecano	1	(0)
2012–2013	Cádiz	25	(0)
2013–2014	Guadalajara	26	(0)
2014–2015	Hércules	6	(0)
2015	Eldense	12	(0)
2015–2016	Cultural Leonesa	34	(2)
2016–2017	Rayo Majadahonda	36	(1)
2017–2018	Lleida Esportiu	27	(0)
2018–2020	Internacional Madrid	45	(0)
2020–2021	Pontevedra	16	(0)
2021–2022	Navalcarnero	20	(1)
Total		342	(5)

Managerial career
- 2022–2023: Paracuellos Antamira (assistant)
- 2024: Rayo Majadahonda (caretaker)
- * Club domestic league appearances and goals

Aitor Salvador Núñez Martín (born 2 October 1987) is a Spanish former professional footballer who played as a right-back.

== Club career ==
Núñez was born in Madrid. After starting out as a senior at local Atlético Madrid, playing two Segunda División B seasons with its reserves, he joined CD Tenerife in the summer of 2009. On 23 September of that year, he made his La Liga debut in a 1–0 home win against Athletic Bilbao, appearing in only five league matches as the Canary Islands team were eventually relegated.

After a further top-flight appearance, with Rayo Vallecano, Núñez returned to the lower leagues of his country, where he represented a host of clubs.
