= Xabi Prieto =

Spanish retired footballer (born 1983)

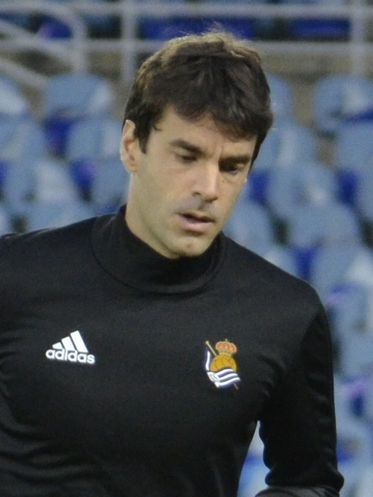
- Prieto with Real Sociedad in 2018

Personal information
- Full name: Xabier Prieto Argarate
- Date of birth: 29 August 1983 (age 43)
- Place of birth: San Sebastián, Spain
- Height: 1.87 m (6 ft 2 in)
- Position: Midfielder

Youth career
- Ikastola Santo Tomas Lizeoa
- 2000–2002: Real Sociedad
- 2000–2001: → Hernani (loan)

Senior career*
Years	Team	Apps	(Gls)
2001–2004	Real Sociedad B	48	(8)
2003–2018	Real Sociedad	479	(67)
Total		527	(75)

International career
2004–2005	Spain U21	5	(0)
2004–2016	Basque Country	14	(0)
- * Club domestic league appearances and goals

Xabier "Xabi" Prieto Argarate (born 29 August 1983) is a Spanish former professional footballer who played mainly as a right midfielder. A player of good dribbling skills, he was also a penalty kick specialist.

He spent his entire career with Real Sociedad, playing 530 competitive matches for the club.

== Club career ==
Born in San Sebastián, Gipuzkoa, Prieto was a graduate of the youth system at his hometown club Real Sociedad, having joined from school aged 16 and spent time on loan with local amateurs CD Hernani. He made his senior debut in 2002 with the reserves, helping them to achieve promotion to Segunda División B in his first season.

After starting the next campaign with the B side, Prieto made his first-team debut on 8 October 2003, playing the full 90 minutes in a 2–1 away win against Real Oviedo in the Copa del Rey. His La Liga bow took place 18 days later, coming off the bench in the 1–0 home victory over Navarrese neighbours CA Osasuna; he would go on to collect a further eight substitute appearances – seven of them late in the game – during that season. However, on 23 May of the following year, with the league's outcome already decided, he profited from his second start to score twice at Real Madrid in a 4–1 win, one of the goals coming from the penalty spot.

Subsequently, Prieto was definitely promoted to the first squad and, in 2005–06, participated in all 38 games and netted nine times, six of them being penalties. He was also ever-present the following campaign, but the Basques dropped down to Segunda División.

Prieto played 35 matches in 2009–10, totalling exactly 3,000 minutes and contributing seven goals as Real Sociedad returned to the top flight after three years. In the first fixture of the following season, at home against Villarreal CF, he scored the only goal after a backheel pass from newly-signed Joseba Llorente.

On 6 January 2013, Prieto netted the first hat-trick of his professional career, albeit in a 4–3 loss at Real Madrid: he scored once through a penalty and twice after one-on-one situations against Iker Casillas. He added a brace on 22 February 2015 in another seven-goal thriller, but now in a 4–3 home defeat of Sevilla FC; in the interim, he made seven appearances for the Txuriurdin in the 2013–14 edition of the UEFA Champions League.

On 25 August 2017, Prieto played his 500th game for the Real Sociedad first team (only the fifth player to reach that milestone after Juan Antonio Larrañaga, Alberto Górriz, Jesús María Zamora and Luis Arconada) a few days prior to his 34th birthday, and marked the occasion with a goal in a 3–0 victory against Villarreal at the Anoeta Stadium. He also received an ovation from supporters in the tenth minute, his shirt number, and a few weeks later he broke the club record for most league appearances (including matches he played in the lower division, unlike the players he overtook).

In April 2018, Prieto confirmed he would be retiring at the end of the season. To honour his contributions, Real Sociedad arranged for the club crest to be replaced with his portrait on the players' shirts for the final match of the campaign against CD Leganés (which would also be the swan song for long-serving defender Carlos Martínez).

== International career ==
Prieto was selected for the Spain under-21 team on several occasions, but never received a cap for the full side. He did feature in several friendlies with the unofficial Basque Country regional XI, and as of 2017 was the team's most-capped player with 14 appearances.

== Personal life ==
Prieto married Amaya Magaña in 2011.

== Career statistics ==
Appearances and goals by club, season and competition
Club	Season	League			Cup		Other		Total	
Club	Season	Division	Apps	Goals	Apps	Goals	Apps	Goals	Apps	Goals
Real Sociedad B	2002–03	Tercera División	34	5	—		—		34	5
Real Sociedad B	2003–04	Segunda División B	14	3	—		—		14	3
Real Sociedad B	Total		48	8	0	0	0	0	48	8
Real Sociedad	2003–04	La Liga	11	2	2	0	—		13	2
Real Sociedad	2004–05	La Liga	23	0	2	1	—		25	1
Real Sociedad	2005–06	La Liga	38	9	0	0	—		38	9
Real Sociedad	2006–07	La Liga	33	3	1	0	—		34	3
Real Sociedad	2007–08	Segunda División	36	4	1	0	—		37	4
Real Sociedad	2008–09	Segunda División	32	4	1	0	—		33	4
Real Sociedad	2009–10	Segunda División	35	7	1	0	—		36	7
Real Sociedad	2010–11	La Liga	37	7	2	0	—		39	7
Real Sociedad	2011–12	La Liga	34	2	4	2	—		38	4
Real Sociedad	2012–13	La Liga	35	9	2	0	—		37	9
Real Sociedad	2013–14	La Liga	30	2	6	0	7 (Note: Appearances in UEFA Champions League)	0	43	2
Real Sociedad	2014–15	La Liga	35	4	3	0	4 (Note: Appearances in UEFA Europa League)	3	42	6
Real Sociedad	2015–16	La Liga	36	3	1	0	—		37	3
Real Sociedad	2016–17	La Liga	38	8	5	0	—		43	8
Real Sociedad	2017–18	La Liga	26	3	2	0	6	0	34	3
Real Sociedad	Total		479	67	33	3	17	3	529	73
Career total			527	75	33	3	17	3	577	81

== Honours ==
Real Sociedad

- Segunda División: 2009–10

== See also ==
- List of one-club men
