= David Concha =

Spanish professional footballer

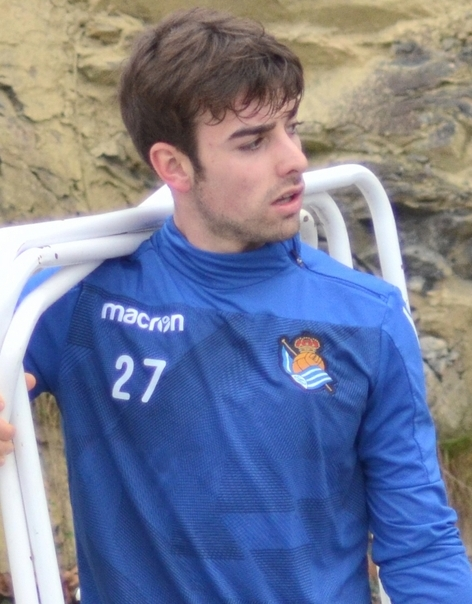
- Concha with Real Sociedad in 2018

Personal information
- Full name: David Concha Salas
- Date of birth: 20 November 1996 (age 29)
- Place of birth: Santander, Spain
- Height: 1.78 m (5 ft 10 in)
- Positions: Winger; forward

Team information
- Current team: Racing Ferrol
- Number: 18

Youth career
- Marina Sport
- 2006–2013: Racing Santander

Senior career*
Years	Team	Apps	(Gls)
2013	Racing B	1	(1)
2013–2015	Racing Santander	48	(5)
2015–2020	Real Sociedad	8	(0)
2015–2016	→ Numancia (loan)	26	(5)
2017–2018	→ Barcelona B (loan)	14	(1)
2019	→ Gamba Osaka (loan)	0	(0)
2019	→ Gamba Osaka U23 (loan)	4	(1)
2020–2022	Badajoz	57	(3)
2022–2023	Hammarby	13	(0)
2023–2025	Gimnàstic	47	(6)
2025–	Racing Ferrol	30	(1)

International career
2014–2015	Spain U19	7	(0)
- * Club domestic league appearances and goals as of 9 June 2026

David Concha Salas (born 20 November 1996) is a Spanish professional footballer who plays as a right winger or forward for Primera Federación club Racing de Ferrol.

== Club career ==
Born in Santander, Cantabria, Concha joined Racing de Santander's youth setup at the age of 9 following a brief stint with lowly CD Marina Sport. He was called up to train with the main squad in December 2013, being also selected for the Copa del Rey match against Sevilla FC. He made his first-team debut on the 6th, coming on as a substitute for Javi Barrio in the 0–1 home loss. He first appeared in the league four days later, again coming from the bench in a 1–0 home win over UD Logroñés in the Segunda División B.

On 8 January 2014, Concha scored his first goal as a senior, helping to a 1–1 home draw against UD Almería also in the domestic cup. He finished the season with 13 appearances, with Racing returning to Segunda División at the first attempt.

Concha played his first match as a professional on 24 August 2014, starting in a 1–0 defeat at Girona FC. He scored his first goal in the division on 21 September, opening an eventual 2–2 home draw with CD Leganés.

On 4 July 2015, Concha signed a five-year contract with La Liga club Real Sociedad after suffering relegation. On 31 August, he was loaned to CD Numancia for one year.

Concha made his top-flight debut on 21 August 2016, starting in a 0–3 home loss to Real Madrid. The following 11 August, he was loaned to FC Barcelona B in the second division for one year, but his loan was cut short on 31 January 2018.

On 9 March 2019, after more than one year of inactivity, Concha moved abroad for the first time in his career after agreeing to a one-year loan with Gamba Osaka. On 27 February 2020, after only two official games, he returned to Spain and joined to CD Badajoz on a short-term contract.

On 6 July 2022, Concha signed a two-and-a-half-year contract with Swedish Allsvenskan side Hammarby Fotboll. The following January, having made 14 competitive appearances, he left by mutual consent and announced his retirement, but returned to active on 11 July 2023 on a one-year deal at Primera Federación's Gimnàstic de Tarragona.

== International career ==
On 16 May 2014, Concha was called up to the Spain under-19 team. He contributed 75 minutes for the champions at the 2015 UEFA European Under-19 Championship in the 3–1 group-stage loss against Russia in Veria, also their opponents in the final.

== Honours ==
Spain U19

- UEFA European Under-19 Championship: 2015
