= Carlos Martínez (footballer, born April 1986) =

Spanish footballer

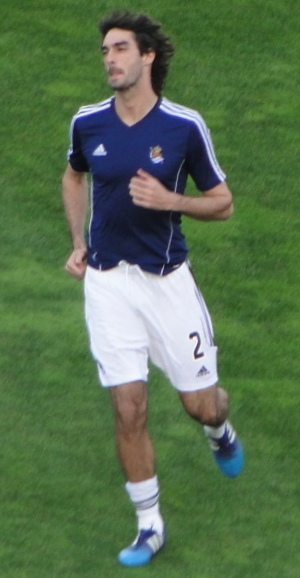
- Martínez with Real Sociedad in 2015

Personal information
- Full name: Carlos Martínez Díez
- Date of birth: 9 April 1986 (age 40)
- Place of birth: Lodosa, Spain
- Height: 1.89 m (6 ft 2 in)
- Position: Right-back

Youth career
- Izarra
- 1999–2004: Real Sociedad

Senior career*
Years	Team	Apps	(Gls)
2004–2007	Real Sociedad B	61	(1)
2007–2018	Real Sociedad	195	(3)
2018–2019	Oviedo	14	(0)
2019–2020	Burgos	17	(0)
Total		287	(4)

International career
2012–2015	Basque Country	3	(0)
- * Club domestic league appearances and goals

Carlos Martínez Díez (born 9 April 1986) is a Spanish former professional footballer who played as a right-back.

He spent most of his career with Real Sociedad, appearing in 209 competitive matches and scoring three goals.

== Club career ==
=== Real Sociedad ===
Born in Lodosa, Navarre, Martínez joined Real Sociedad from local CD Izarra, aged 13. He made his senior debut with the former's B team, going on to spend two full seasons in the Segunda División B.

In the 2007–08 campaign, with the main squad in Segunda División after 40 years, Martínez started competing as a professional. He played his first league match on 26 August 2007 in a 0–2 home loss against CD Castellón, and scored his first goal on 25 November of that year to help the hosts beat Málaga CF 3–0.

Martínez contributed 23 games – 22 starts – in 2009–10 as the Txuriurdin returned to La Liga after three years, as champions. He made his debut in the competition on 29 August 2010 by featuring the full 90 minutes in a 1–0 home victory over Villarreal CF; in the following seasons, he battled for first-choice status with fellow youth graduate Dani Estrada.

In May 2018, after he made only a single Copa del Rey appearance since December 2016 due to injuries and the form of the emerging Álvaro Odriozola in his position, the club announced that Martínez would be departing from the club on the expiry of his contract at the end of the campaign, at the same time as long-time teammate Xabi Prieto.

=== Oviedo and Burgos ===
On 6 July 2018, Martínez signed a one-year deal with Real Oviedo in the second division. On 9 August 2019, he moved down one tier and joined Burgos CF; the following 15 January, he terminated his contract by mutual consent.

Martínez announced his retirement on 30 July 2020, at the age of 34.

== Honours ==
Real Sociedad

- Segunda División: 2009–10
