= Eneko Capilla =

Spanish footballer

Personal information
- Full name: Eneko Capilla González
- Date of birth: 13 June 1995 (age 31)
- Place of birth: San Sebastián, Spain
- Height: 1.67 m (5 ft 5 1/2 in)
- Position: Winger

Team information
- Current team: SS Reyes
- Number: 19

Youth career
- Antiguoko
- 2010–2014: Real Sociedad

Senior career*
Years	Team	Apps	(Gls)
2012–2018	Real Sociedad B	94	(15)
2015–2019	Real Sociedad	3	(0)
2016–2017	→ Numancia (loan)	33	(0)
2018–2019	→ Cultural Leonesa (loan)	26	(6)
2019–2023	Asteras Tripolis	43	(2)
2023	Iraklis	9	(0)
2024	Calahorra	11	(2)
2024–	SS Reyes	25	(1)
- * Club domestic league appearances and goals as of 7 May 2026

Eneko Capilla González (born 13 June 1995) is a Spanish professional footballer who plays as a left winger for UD San Sebastián de los Reyes.

== Club career ==
Born in San Sebastián, Gipuzkoa, Capilla joined Real Sociedad's youth setup in 2010, aged 15, after starting out at Antiguoko. While still a junior, he made his senior debut with the reserves on 10 November 2012, coming on as a second-half substitute in a 2–2 home draw against SD Logroñés in the Segunda División B.

On 27 November 2013, Capilla was called up to train with the main squad. He was promoted to the B team on 23 June 2014, and renewed his contract on 1 October 2014 until 2020.

Capilla made his first-team – and La Liga – debut on 1 May 2015, replacing Carlos Vela in the dying minutes of a 3–0 home win against Levante UD. On 17 July of the following year, he was loaned to Segunda División side CD Numancia for one year.

On 15 August 2018, Capilla joined third-tier Cultural y Deportiva Leonesa on a season-long deal. In July 2019, upon returning from loan, he moved abroad after being transferred to Greek club Asteras Tripolis FC.

== Personal life ==
Capilla's older brother, Asier, was also a footballer. A goalkeeper, he too was developed at Real Sociedad.
