= Pablo Hervías =

Spanish footballer

Personal information
- Full name: Pablo Hervías Ruiz
- Date of birth: 8 March 1993 (age 33)
- Place of birth: Logroño, La Rioja, Spain
- Height: 1.74 m (5 ft 9 in)
- Position: Winger

Team information
- Current team: Pontevedra
- Number: 21

Youth career
- 1999–2005: Peña Balsamaiso
- 2005–2011: Real Sociedad

Senior career*
| Years | Team | Apps | (Gls) |
| 2011–2015 | Real Sociedad B | 97 | (11) |
| 2014–2017 | Real Sociedad | 16 | (1) |
| 2015 | → Osasuna (loan) | 6 | (1) |
| 2015–2016 | → Oviedo (loan) | 32 | (1) |
| 2016–2017 | → Elche (loan) | 40 | (2) |
| 2017–2019 | Eibar | 3 | (0) |
| 2017–2018 | → Valladolid (loan) | 38 | (4) |
| 2019 | → Valladolid (loan) | 3 | (0) |
| 2019–2022 | Valladolid | 58 | (1) |
| 2022 | Málaga | 1 | (0) |
| 2023 | Bolívar | 13 | (1) |
| 2024 | Rayo Majadahonda | 12 | (0) |
| 2024–2025 | Amorebieta | 35 | (4) |
| 2025– | Pontevedra | 0 | (0) |

International career
| 2010 | Spain U17 | 4 | (0) |
Medal record
Men's football
Representing Spain
UEFA European Under-17 Championship
| Runner-up | 2010 Liechtenstein |
- * Club domestic league appearances and goals as of 20 September 2025

Pablo Hervías Ruiz (born 8 March 1993) is a Spanish professional footballer who plays as a winger for Primera Federación club Pontevedra.

== Club career ==
=== Real Sociedad ===
Hervías was born in Logroño, La Rioja, and started playing football with local Peña Balsamaiso CF, being signed by Real Sociedad in 2005. He made his senior debut in the 2011–12 season, appearing for the reserves in Segunda División B.

Late into 2011, Hervías renewed his contract until 2016. He played his first competitive game with the first team on 19 April 2014, coming on as a late substitute for Chory Castro in a 2–1 La Liga home win against RCD Espanyol.

Hervías scored his first goal for the Txuriurdin's main squad on 20 October 2014: again after having replaced Castro, he put the hosts ahead in the 82nd minute of a league home fixture against Getafe CF, but in an eventual 2–1 loss. On 8 May of the following year, he was loaned to Segunda División strugglers CA Osasuna until June, as a replacement to injured Jordan Lotiès; he found the net in his first appearance, helping his team to a 2–0 home victory over CD Mirandés after replacing Karim Ansarifard.

On 25 July 2015, Hervías renewed his contract until 2018, and moved to second division club Real Oviedo on 3 August, on loan for one year. On 10 August of the following year, he joined Elche CF of the same league also in a temporary deal.

=== Eibar ===
Hervías signed with SD Eibar on 5 July 2017, moving on loan to Real Valladolid seven days later. After helping the latter in their top-flight promotion he returned to his parent club, but rejoined Valladolid on loan on 23 January 2019.

=== Valladolid ===
On 14 May 2019, Hervías was permanently signed by Valladolid as they remained in the top tier for the following campaign. He scored his first goal in the competition on 15 September, in a 1–1 home draw with Osasuna.

=== Málaga ===
On 12 August 2022, Hervías joined Málaga CF on a one-year deal.

== International career ==
In 2009, Hervías was called up by the Spain under-16 team. He represented his country at the 2010 UEFA European Under-17 Championship, featuring in all the matches but one and losing the final.

Hervías was promoted to the under-19s in 2012.

== Personal life ==
Hervías' father, Eloy, played football for CD Logroñés and also acted as a referee. His brother, Rubén, competed in the lower divisions of Spanish football.
