= 2017–18 CD Leganés season =

CD Leganés
2017–18 season
- President: María Victoria Pavón
- Head coach: Asier Garitano
- Stadium: Butarque
- La Liga: 17th
- Copa del Rey: Semi-final
- Top goalscorer: League: Gabriel (5); All: Gabriel (6)
Home colours	Away colours	Third colours

During the 2017–18 season, CD Leganés participated in La Liga for the second time in their history, and the Copa del Rey.

== Squad ==
As of 9 September 2017

Note: Flags indicate national team as defined under FIFA eligibility rules; some limited exceptions apply. Players may hold more than one non-FIFA nationality.

No.	Pos.	Nation	Player
1	GK	ESP	Iván Cuéllar
2	DF	ESP	Tito
3	DF	ESP	Unai Bustinza
4	MF	ESP	Erik Morán
5	DF	ARG	Martín Mantovani (Captain)
6	MF	ESP	Gerard Gumbau
7	FW	CIV	Mamadou Koné
8	MF	BRA	Gabriel
9	FW	ESP	Miguel Ángel Guerrero
10	MF	MAR	Nabil El Zhar
11	MF	ARG	Alexander Szymanowski
12	FW	GLP	Claudio Beauvue (on loan from Celta Vigo)
13	GK	ARG	Nereo Champagne (on loan from Olimpo)

No.	Pos.	Nation	Player
14	DF	ESP	Raúl García
15	DF	ESP	Diego Rico
16	DF	ARG	Mauro dos Santos
17	MF	ESP	Javier Eraso
18	FW	ESP	José Naranjo (on loan to Genk)
19	DF	ARG	Ezequiel Muñoz
20	DF	ESP	Joseba Zaldúa (on loan from Real Sociedad)
21	MF	ESP	Rubén Pérez (on loan from Granada)
22	DF	GRE	Dimitris Siovas
23	MF	ESP	Omar Ramos
24	MF	SRB	Darko Brašanac (on loan from Real Betis)
25	FW	MAR	Nordin Amrabat (on loan from Watford)
—	GK	ESP	Jon Ander Serantes (2nd captain)

=== Transfers ===
- List of Spanish football transfers summer 2017#Leganés

==== In ====
Date	Player	From	Type	Fee	Ref
5 June 2017	(Spain) Raúl García	(Spain) Alavés	Transfer	Free	
1 July 2017	(Greece) Dimitris Siovas	(Greece) Olympiacos	Transfer	€3,000,000	
1 July 2017	(Spain) Tito	(Spain) Granada	Transfer	€600,000	
4 July 2017	(Spain) Joseba Zaldúa	(Spain) Real Sociedad	Loan	Free	
5 July 2017	(Spain) Iván Cuéllar	(Spain) Sporting Gijón	Transfer	Free	
11 July 2017	(Argentina) Mauro	(Spain) Eibar	Transfer	Free	
12 July 2017	(Spain) Gerard Gumbau	(Spain) Barcelona B	Transfer	Free	
24 July 2017	(Spain) Javi Eraso	(Spain) Athletic Bilbao	Transfer	Free	
25 July 2017	(Argentina) Nereo Champagne	(Argentina) Olimpo	Loan	Free	
8 August 2017	(Argentina) Ezequiel Muñoz	(Italy) Genoa	Transfer	€2,500,000	
23 August 2017	(Ghana) Owusu Kwabena	(Ghana) SC Accra	Transfer	Undisclosed	

==== Out ====
Date	Player	To	Type	Fee	Ref
30 June 2017	(Spain) Unai López	(Spain) Athletic Bilbao	Loan return	Free	
30 June 2017	(Spain) Robert	(Spain) Valencia	Loan return	Free	
30 June 2017	(Argentina) Nereo Champagne	(Argentina) Olimpo	Loan return	Free	
30 June 2017	(Spain) Alberto Bueno	(Portugal) Porto	Loan return	Free	
30 June 2017	(Spain) Adrián Marín	(Spain) Villarreal	Loan return	Free	
30 June 2017	(Brazil) Luciano	(Brazil) Corinthians	Loan return	Free	
30 June 2017	(Spain) Pablo Insua	(Spain) Deportivo La Coruña	Loan return	Free	
30 June 2017	(Venezuela) Darwin Machís	(Spain) Granada	Loan return	Free	
30 June 2017	(Spain) Iago Herrerín	(Spain) Athletic Bilbao	Loan return	Free	
30 June 2017	(Spain) Samu García	(Russia) Rubin Kazan	Loan return	Free	
4 July 2017	(Spain) Víctor Díaz	(Spain) Granada	Transfer	Free	
7 July 2017	(Spain) Alberto Martín	(Spain) Granada	Transfer	Free	

== Pre-season and friendlies ==
Team 1	Score	Team 2
Fuenlabrada	0–1	Leganés
Real Madrid Castilla	0–2	Leganés
Talavera	0–2	Leganés
Real Valladolid	1–0	Leganés
Rayo Vallecano	0–2	Leganés
Leganés	1–1	Alavés
Leganés	0–1	Atlético Madrid
Toledo	3–0	Leganés

== Competitions ==
=== Overall ===
Competition	Final position
La Liga	-
Copa del Rey	Semi-finals

=== La Liga ===
==== League table ====
Pos	Team	Pld	W	D	L	GF	GA	GD	Pts	Qualification or relegation
15	Levante	38	11	13	14	44	58	−14	46	
16	Athletic Bilbao	38	10	13	15	41	49	−8	43 (Note: Athletic Bilbao finished ahead of Leganés on head-to-head goal difference: Athletic Bilbao 2–0 Leganés, Leganés 1–0 Athletic Bilbao.)	
17	Leganés	38	12	7	19	34	51	−17	43	
18	Deportivo La Coruña (R)	38	6	11	21	38	76	−38	29	Relegation to Segunda División
19	Las Palmas (R)	38	5	7	26	24	74	−50	22	Relegation to Segunda División

Source: La Liga, Soccerway
Rules for classification: 1) Points; 2) Head-to-head points; 3) Head-to-head goal difference; 4) Goal difference; 5) Goals scored; 6) Fair-play points (Note: Head-to-head record is used only after all the matches between the teams in question have been played)
(R) Relegated

==== Matches ====
Win Draw Loss Fixtures

18 August 2017 1	Leganés	1–0	Alavés	Leganés
20:15 CEST (UTC+02:00)	Gabriel 24'	Report	Wakaso (yellow card) 23'	Stadium: Butarque; Attendance: 9,231; Referee: José Luis Munuera Montero

27 August 2017 2	Espanyol	0–1	Leganés	Cornellà de Llobregat
18:15 CEST (UTC+02:00)	Naldo (yellow card) 49'; Granero (yellow card) 52'; Pérez (yellow card) 59'	Report	Mantovani 28'; Eraso (yellow card) 73'; Rico (yellow card) 79'; Gumbau (yellow card) 90'	Stadium: RCDE Stadium; Attendance: 18,383; Referee: Pablo González Fuertes

8 September 2017 3	Leganés	1–2	Getafe	Leganés
21:00 CEST (UTC+02:00)	Guerrero 65'; Morán (yellow card) 74'	Report	Arambarri 39'; Jiménez 83'; Amath (yellow card) 48'; Cala (yellow card) 70'	Stadium: Butarque; Attendance: 11,454; Referee: Alfonso Álvarez Izquierdo

15 September 2017 4	Eibar	1–0	Leganés	Eibar
21:00 CEST (UTC+02:00)	García (yellow card) 43'; Oliveira (yellow card) 48'; Gálvez 53'	Report	Brašanac (yellow card) 3'; Mauro (yellow card) 25'; Rico (yellow card) 50'; Siovas (yellow card) 63'; Guerrero (yellow card) 66'	Stadium: Ipurua; Attendance: 4,986; Referee: Juan Martínez Munuera

20 September 2017 5	Leganés	0–0	Girona	Leganés
20:00 CEST (UTC+02:00)	Pérez (yellow card) 78'; Zaldúa (yellow card) 90'	Report	Stuani (yellow card) 30'; Juanpe (yellow card) 64'; Douglas Luiz (yellow card) 73'	Stadium: Butarque; Attendance: 9,090; Referee: Mario Melero López

24 September 2017 6	Las Palmas	0–2	Leganés	Las Palmas
18:30 CEST (UTC+02:00)	Lemos (yellow card) 66'	Report	Beauvue 47'; Eraso 90+6'; García (yellow card) 16'; Brašanac (yellow card) 58'; Zaldúa (yellow card) 86'	Stadium: Gran Canaria; Attendance: 17,560; Referee: Javier Alberola Rojas

30 September 2017 7	Leganés	0–0	Atlético Madrid	Leganés
20:45 CEST (UTC+02:00)	Pérez (yellow card) 48'; Szymanowski (yellow card) 77'	Report	Vrsaljko (yellow card) 89'	Stadium: Butarque; Attendance: 11,454; Referee: Jesús Gil Manzano

15 October 2017 8	Málaga	0–2	Leganés	Málaga
18:30 CEST (UTC+02:00)	Baysse (yellow card) 38'; Recio (yellow card) 43' (yellow-red card) 81'; Rosales (yellow card) 84'	Report	Zaldúa (yellow card) 22'; Siovas (yellow card) 47'; Gabriel 56'; Szymanowski 78'; Pérez (yellow card) 90'	Stadium: La Rosaleda; Attendance: 23,951; Referee: José González González

22 October 2017 9	Leganés	1–0	Athletic Bilbao	Leganés
18:30 CEST (UTC+02:00)	Pérez (yellow card) 11'; Eraso (yellow card) 45'; Beauvue 54'; Siovas (yellow card) 82'	Report	Vesga (yellow card) 31'; San José (yellow card) 43'; Iturraspe (yellow card) 64'; Núñez (yellow card) 79'	Stadium: Butarque; Attendance: 10,509; Referee: Antonio Mateu Lahoz

28 October 2017 10	Sevilla	2–1	Leganés	Seville
22:30 CEST (UTC+02:00)	Ben Yedder 20'; Sarabia 54'	Report	Pérez (yellow card) 30'; Alexander 48' (pen.); Gabriel (yellow card) 67'; Naranjo (yellow card) 84'	Stadium: Ramón Sánchez Pizjuán; Attendance: 32,097; Referee: David Medié Jiménez

5 November 2017 11	Valencia	3–0	Leganés	Valencia
13:00 CET (UTC+01:00)	Parejo 14', (yellow card) 90+1'; Rodrigo 71'; Mina 82' (pen.)	Report	Beauvue (yellow card) 84'	Stadium: Mestalla; Attendance: 39,694; Referee: Ricardo de Burgos Bengoetxea

18 November 2017 12	Leganés	0–3	Barcelona	Leganés
16:15 CET	Siovas (yellow card) 72'	Report	L. Suárez 28', 60'; Piqué (yellow card) 29'; Paulinho 90'	Stadium: Butarque; Attendance: 11,454; Referee: Alberto Undiano Mallenco
Note: L. Suárez was given a yellow card ( (yellow card) 53') which was later rescinded by the Royal Spanish Football Federation.

24 November 2017 13	Celta Vigo	1–0	Leganés	Vigo
21:00 CET (UTC+01:00)	Aspas 27' (pen.); Fontàs (yellow card) 84'; Jonny (yellow card) 89'	Report	Morán (yellow card) 26'; Mauro (yellow card) 65'; Gumbau (yellow card) 73'	Stadium: Balaídos; Attendance: 10,611; Referee: Alejandro Hernández Hernández

3 December 2017 14	Leganés	3–1	Villarreal	Leganés
12:00 CET (UTC+01:00)	Rico (yellow card) 45', (goal) 72'; El Zhar 81', (yellow card) 90+1'; Gabriel 90+3'	Report	Raba (yellow card) 17', (goal) 60'; Trigueros (yellow card) 42'; Bonera (yellow card) 42'; Marín (yellow card) 50'	Stadium: Butarque; Attendance: 9,233; Referee: David Fernández Borbalán

9 December 2017 15	Deportivo La Coruña	1–0	Leganés	A Coruña
18:30 CET (UTC+01:00)	Adrián 24'; Schär (yellow card) 27'; Borges (yellow card) 48'; Guilherme (yellow card) 53'; Navarro (yellow card) 90+3'	Report	Pérez (yellow card) 39'; Gumbau (yellow card) 61'; Beauvue (yellow card) 89'; Gabriel (yellow card) 90'	Stadium: Abanca-Riazor; Attendance: 18,366; Referee: Mario Melero López

17 December 2017 16	Leganés	v	Real Madrid	Leganés
				Stadium: Butarque

19 December 2017 17	Levante	0–0	Leganés	Valencia
21:30 CET (UTC+01:00)	Lerma (yellow card) 35'; Campaña (yellow card) 50' (yellow-red card) 90+4'; Bardhi (yellow card) 77'; José Luis Morales (yellow card) 90+2'; Cabaco (yellow card) 90+5'	Report	Mauro (yellow card) 23'; Gumbau (yellow card) 61'; Amrabat (yellow card) 63' (yellow-red card) 68'; Zaldúa (yellow card) 68'; Beauvue (yellow card) 80'	Stadium: Estadi Ciutat de València; Attendance: 14,639; Referee: Santiago Jaime Latre

7 January 2018 18	Leganés	1–0	Real Sociedad	Leganés
12:00 CET (UTC+01:00)	Gabriel 75'	Report	Willian José (yellow card) 34'	Stadium: Butarque; Attendance: 7,523; Referee: Xavier Estrada Fernández

15 January 2018 19	Real Betis	3–2	Leganés	Seville
21:00 CET (UTC+01:00)	Tello 20'; Joaquín 40'; Boudebouz (yellow card) 54'; Castro 83' (pen.); Durmisi (yellow card) 90+1'	Report	Gerard Gumbau 44', (yellow card) 89'; Eraso 71', (yellow card) 82'; Cuéllar (yellow card) 83'	Stadium: Benito Villamarín; Attendance: 41,837; Referee: Ignacio Iglesias Villanueva

21 January 2018 20	Alavés	2–2	Leganés	Vitoria-Gasteiz
12:00 CET (UTC+01:00)	Munir 46'; Pedraza 52'; Rodrigo Ely (yellow card) 56' (yellow-red card) 87'; Pina (yellow card) 89'	Report	Eraso (yellow card) 22'; Mantovani (yellow card) 61'; Gabriel 75' (pen.); Zaldúa 90'; Amrabat (yellow card) 90+3'	Stadium: Mendizorrotza; Attendance: 19,637; Referee: Daniel Trujillo Suárez

28 January 2018 21	Leganés	3–2	Espanyol	Leganés
12:00 CET (UTC+01:00)	Hermoso 11', 82' (o.g.); Guerrero (yellow card) 62', (goal) 69'; Bustinza (yellow card) 90+3'	Report	Granero (yellow card) 40'; Navarro 49'; Duarte (yellow card) 74'; Darder (yellow card) 86'; Hermoso 88'; Baptistão (yellow card) 90+3'	Stadium: Butarque; Attendance: 10,132; Referee: Juan Martínez Munuera

4 February 2017 22	Getafe	0–0	Leganés	Getafe
12:00 CET (UTC+01:00)	Suárez (yellow card) 55'; Antunes (yellow card) 86'	Summary	Zaldúa (yellow card) 13'; Ramos (yellow card) 25'; Naranjo (yellow card) 46'; Mantovani (yellow card) 61'; Cuéllar (yellow card) 72'; Pérez (yellow card) 75'	Stadium: Coliseum Alfonso Pérez; Attendance: 10,657; Referee: Alfonso Álvarez Izquierdo

10 February 2018 23	Leganés	0–1	Eibar	Leganés
18:30 CET (UTC+01:00)	Gabriel (yellow card) 69'; Siovas (yellow card) 74' (yellow-red card) 84'; Muñoz (yellow card) 77'	Summary	Charles (yellow card) 80'; Ramis 90+4', (yellow card) 90+5'	Stadium: Butarque; Attendance: 8,694; Referee: Pablo González Fuertes

16 February 2018 24	Girona	3–0	Leganés	Girona
21:00 CET (UTC+01:00)	Stuani 23' (pen.); Granell (yellow card) 31'; Portu 36'; A. García (yellow card) 49'; B. García (yellow card) 71'; Juanpe 85'	Summary	Mantovani (yellow card) 22'; Gumbau (yellow card) 67'; Amrabat (yellow card) 77'; Zaldúa (yellow card) 84'; Pérez (yellow card) 84'	Stadium: Montilivi; Attendance: 8,923; Referee: Antonio Mateu Lahoz

21 February 2018 16	Leganés	1–3	Real Madrid	Leganés
18:45 CET (UTC+01:00)	Bustinza 6'; Rico (yellow card) 51'; Cuéllar (yellow card) 85'; Pérez (yellow card) 86'	Summary	Vázquez 11'; Casemiro 29'; Ramos (yellow card) 57', (goal) 90' (pen.)	Stadium: Butarque; Attendance: 11,423; Referee: José González González

24 February 2018 25	Leganés	0–0	Las Palmas	Leganés
18:30 CET (UTC+01:00)	Gabriel (yellow card) 66'; Guerrero (yellow card) 74'; Pérez (yellow card) 90+2'; Siovas (yellow card) 90+3'	Summary	Navarro (yellow card) 38'; Toledo (yellow card) 87'; Aquilani (yellow card) 89'; Chichzola (yellow card) 90+2'; Calleri (yellow card) 90+3'	Stadium: Butarque; Attendance: 8,817; Referee: Santiago Jaime Latre

28 February 2018 26	Atlético Madrid	4–0	Leganés	Madrid
21:30 CET (UTC+01:00)	Griezmann 26', 35', 56', 67', (yellow card) 69'	Summary	Gumbau (yellow card) 53'; Ramos (yellow card) 82'; Bustinza (yellow card) 86'	Stadium: Wanda Metropolitano; Attendance: 35,033; Referee: Xavier Estrada Fernández

3 March 2018 27	Leganés	2–0	Málaga	Leganés
18:30 CET (UTC+01:00)	Amrabat (yellow card) 31', (goal) 62'; Eraso 55'; Garitano (red card) 63'	Summary	Ideye (yellow card) 85'	Stadium: Butarque; Attendance: 5,970; Referee: Ignacio Iglesias Villanueva

11 March 2018 28	Athletic Bilbao	2–0	Leganés	Bilbao
20:45 CET (UTC+01:00)	García 10', 17', (yellow card) 68'; Córdoba (yellow card) 28'	Summary	El Zhar (yellow card) 12'; Zaldúa (yellow card) 36'; Brašanac (yellow card) 66'; Siovas (yellow card) 72'; Bustinza (yellow card) 89'	Stadium: San Mamés; Attendance: 30,896; Referee: José María Sánchez Martínez

18 March 2018 29	Leganés	2–1	Sevilla	Leganés
12:00 CEST (UTC+02:00)	Bustinza 41'; Amrabat (yellow card) 65'; Eraso 69'; Siovas (yellow card) 77'	Summary	Escudero (yellow card) 40'; Sarabia (yellow card) 73' (yellow-red card) 84'; Nzonzi (yellow card) 80'; Layún 90'	Stadium: Butarque; Attendance: 9,204; Referee: Javier Alberola Rojas

1 April 2018 30	Leganés	0–1	Valencia	Leganés
16:15 CEST (UTC+02:00)	Pérez (yellow card) 31'; Rico (yellow card) 57'; Beauvue (yellow card) 88'	Summary	Kondogbia (yellow card) 33'; Rodrigo 62'; Domènech (yellow card) 86'; Gayà (yellow card) 89'; Parejo (yellow card) 90+4'	Stadium: Butarque; Attendance: 9,377; Referee: Mario Melero López

7 April 2018 31	Barcelona	3–1	Leganés	Barcelona
20:45 CEST (UTC+02:00)	Messi 27', 32', 87'; Coutinho (yellow card) 78'; Alba (yellow card) 84'	Summary	Siovas (yellow card) 51'; Gabriel (yellow card) 55'; El Zhar 68'; Pérez (yellow card) 76'; Zaldúa (yellow card) 79'	Stadium: Camp Nou; Attendance: 72,126; Referee: Ricardo de Burgos Bengoetxea

14 April 2018 32	Leganés	1–0	Celta Vigo	Leganés
18:30 CEST (UTC+02:00)	Guerrero 63'; Rico (yellow card) 83'; Gumbau (yellow card) 88'; Cuéllar (yellow card) 90+3'	Summary	Hernández (yellow card) 59'; Mor (yellow card) 80'; Mallo (yellow card) 87'	Stadium: Butarque; Attendance: 9,147; Referee: Alejandro Hernández Hernández

17 April 2018 33	Villarreal	2–1	Leganés	Villarreal
21:30 CEST (UTC+02:00)	Trigueros (yellow card) 39'; Ruiz 42'; Bacca 55'	Summary	Gabriel (yellow card) 32'; Brašanac 82'	Stadium: Estadio de la Cerámica; Attendance: 12,398; Referee: Daniel Trujillo Suárez

20 April 2018 34	Leganés	0–0	Deportivo La Coruña	Leganés
21:00 CEST (UTC+02:00)		Summary	Çolak (yellow card) 28'; Adrián (yellow card) 90'	Stadium: Butarque; Attendance: 9,366; Referee: Alfonso Álvarez Izquierdo

28 April 2018 35	Real Madrid	2–1	Leganés	Madrid
18:30 CEST (UTC+02:00)	Bale 8'; Mayoral 45'	Summary	Brašanac 66'; Zaldúa (yellow card) 73'; Gabriel (red card) 90+3'	Stadium: Santiago Bernabéu Stadium; Attendance: 59,812; Referee: Ignacio Iglesias Villanueva

7 May 2018 36	Leganés	0–3	Levante	Leganés
21:00 CEST (UTC+02:00)	Pérez (yellow card) 19'; Amrabat (yellow card) 40'; Zaldúa (red card) 57'; Bustinza (yellow card) 61'; Rico (yellow card) 74'; Ramos (yellow card) 79'	Summary	Jason (yellow card) 35'; Morales 55'; Bardhi 59'; Coke 77'	Stadium: Butarque; Attendance: 7,832; Referee: José María Sánchez Martínez

12 May 2018 37	Real Sociedad	3–2	Leganés	San Sebastián
16:15 CEST (UTC+02:00)	Oyarzabal 18'; Canales 25'; Illarramendi (yellow card) 67'; Willian José 78' (pen.)	Summary	Rico 26', (yellow card) 85'; Guerrero 53'; Bustinza (yellow card) 77'	Stadium: Anoeta; Attendance: 19,898; Referee: David Medié Jiménez

19 May 2018 38	Leganés	3–2	Real Betis	Leganés
16:15 CEST (UTC+02:00)	Rico (yellow card) 23' (yellow-red card) 23'; Siovas 28'; Naranjo 64'; Amrabat 79'	Summary	Campbell 20'; Sanabria 76'	Stadium: Butarque; Attendance: 9,426; Referee: Jesús Gil Manzano

=== Copa del Rey ===
==== Round of 32 ====
25 October 2017	Valladolid	1–2	Leganés	Valladolid
20:30	Cotán 52'	Report	Rico 46'; Beauvue 88'	Stadium: José Zorrilla; Attendance: 7,289; Referee: Jesús Gil Manzano

28 November 2017	Leganés	1–0 (3–1 agg.)	Valladolid	Leganés
19:30	Tito 34'	Report		Stadium: Butarque; Attendance: 5,732; Referee: José Luis Munuera Montero

==== Round of 16 ====
4 January 2018	Leganés	1–0	Villarreal	Leganés
19:00	Pérez (yellow card) 32'; Amrabat 49'; Siovas (yellow card) 90'	Report	Álvaro (yellow card) 67'	Stadium: Butarque; Attendance: 9,173; Referee: José María Sánchez Martínez

10 January 2018	Villarreal	2–1 (2–2 agg.)	Leganés	Villarreal
19:30	Rukavina (yellow card) 36'; Raba 48'; Fornals (yellow card) 64'; Cheryshev 89'	Report	El Zhar 31'; Siovas (yellow card) 44'; Gumbau (yellow card) 53'; Champagne (yellow card) 64'; Pérez (yellow card) 90+4'	Stadium: Estadio de la Cerámica; Attendance: 12,122; Referee: Alfonso Álvarez Izquierdo

==== Quarter-finals ====
18 January 2018 First Leg	Leganés	0–1	Real Madrid	Leganés
21:30	El Zhar (yellow card) 39'; Gumbau (yellow card) 62'; Naranjo (yellow card) 67'	Report	Asensio 89'	Stadium: Butarque; Attendance: 11,327; Referee: José María Sánchez Martínez

24 January 2018 Second Leg	Real Madrid	1–2 (2–2 agg.)	Leganés	Madrid
21:30	Benzema 47'; Ramos (yellow card) 80'	Report	Tito (yellow card) 27'; Eraso 31'; Gabriel 55'; Champagne (yellow card) 75'	Stadium: Santiago Bernabéu Stadium; Attendance: 46,409; Referee: Jesús Gil Manzano

==== Semi-finals ====
31 January 2018 First leg	Leganés	1–1	Sevilla	Leganés
21:30	Brašanac (yellow card) 23'; Siovas 56'; Ramos (yellow card) 88'	Summary	Muriel 21'; Escudero (yellow card) 47'; Vázquez (yellow card) 65'; Lenglet (yellow card) 73'; Sarabia (yellow card) 86'	Stadium: Butarque; Attendance: 11,454; Referee: José González González

7 February 2018 Second leg	Sevilla	2–0 (3–1 agg.)	Leganés	Seville
21:30	Correa 15'; Vázquez 89'	Summary	Amrabat (yellow card) 50'	Stadium: Ramón Sánchez Pizjuán; Attendance: 39,705; Referee: Xavier Estrada Fernández

== Statistics ==
=== Appearances and goals ===
No.	Pos	Nat	Player	Total		La Liga		Copa del Rey	
No.	Pos	Nat	Player	Apps	Goals	Apps	Goals	Apps	Goals
Goalkeepers
1	GK	(Spain) ESP	Iván Cuéllar	35	0	35	0	0	0
13	GK	(Argentina) ARG	Nereo Champagne	10	0	2	0	8	0
25	GK	(Spain) ESP	Jon Ander Serantes	1	0	1	0	0	0
Defenders
2	DF	(Spain) ESP	Tito	17	1	6+3	0	8	1
3	DF	(Spain) ESP	Unai Bustinza	26	2	18+2	2	6	0
5	DF	(Argentina) ARG	Martín Mantovani	19	1	10+4	1	1+4	0
14	DF	(Spain) ESP	Raúl García	24	0	15+4	0	3+2	0
15	DF	(Spain) ESP	Diego Rico	33	3	26	2	6+1	1
16	DF	(Argentina) ARG	Mauro dos Santos	14	0	10+4	0	0	0
19	DF	(Argentina) ARG	Ezequiel Muñoz	21	0	17+2	0	2	0
20	DF	(Spain) ESP	Joseba Zaldúa	30	1	29+1	1	0	0
22	DF	(Greece) GRE	Dimitris Siovas	30	2	24	1	6	1
Midfielders
6	MF	(Spain) ESP	Gerard Gumbau	31	1	16+9	1	5+1	0
8	MF	(Brazil) BRA	Gabriel	35	6	28+1	5	5+1	1
10	MF	(Morocco) MAR	Nabil El Zhar	38	3	20+10	2	8	1
11	MF	(Argentina) ARG	Alexander Szymanowski	15	2	13	2	0+2	0
17	MF	(Spain) ESP	Javier Eraso	42	5	31+3	4	5+3	1
21	MF	(Spain) ESP	Rubén Pérez	36	0	29+2	0	5	0
23	MF	(Spain) ESP	Omar Ramos	26	0	18+5	0	0+3	0
24	MF	(Serbia) SRB	Darko Brašanac	28	2	13+10	2	3+2	0
25	MF	(Morocco) MAR	Nordin Amrabat	35	3	17+13	2	4+1	1
28	MF	(Spain) ESP	Álex Mozo	1	0	0+1	0	0	0
29	MF	(Spain) ESP	Sergio Arribas	1	0	0+1	0	0	0
30	MF	(Spain) ESP	Jaime Sierra	2	0	0+2	0	0	0
Forwards
9	FW	(Spain) ESP	Miguel Ángel Guerrero	22	4	15+7	4	0	0
12	FW	(Guadeloupe) GLP	Claudio Beauvue	35	3	17+11	2	5+2	1
18	FW	(Spain) ESP	José Naranjo	22	1	6+10	1	5+1	0
Players transferred out during the season
4	MF	(Spain) ESP	Erik Morán	7	0	2+4	0	1	0
7	FW	(Ivory Coast) CIV	Mamadou Koné	2	0	0	0	2	0

Last updated: 30 May 2018
Source: BDFutbol
