= Arribas =

Arribas is a surname.

Notable people with this surname include:

- Alejandro Arribas, Spanish football player for Real Oviedo
- Francisco Gutiérrez Arribas, Spanish sculptor
- Gustavo Arribas, Argentine politician
- Igone Arribas, Spanish rhythmic gymnast
- José Arribas, French football player
- Maritza Arribas Robaina, Cuban chess player
- Miguel Arribas, Puerto Rican politician
- Óscar Arribas, Spanish football player for AD Alcorcón
- Sergio Arribas (footballer, born 1995), Spanish football player for Villarubia CF
- Sergio Arribas (footballer, born 2001), Spanish football player for Real Madrid Castilla

== See also ==
- Arybbas of Epirus, 4th century BCE king of the Molossians, whose name is sometimes transliterated as "Arribas"
