= List of international goals scored by Samuel Eto'o =

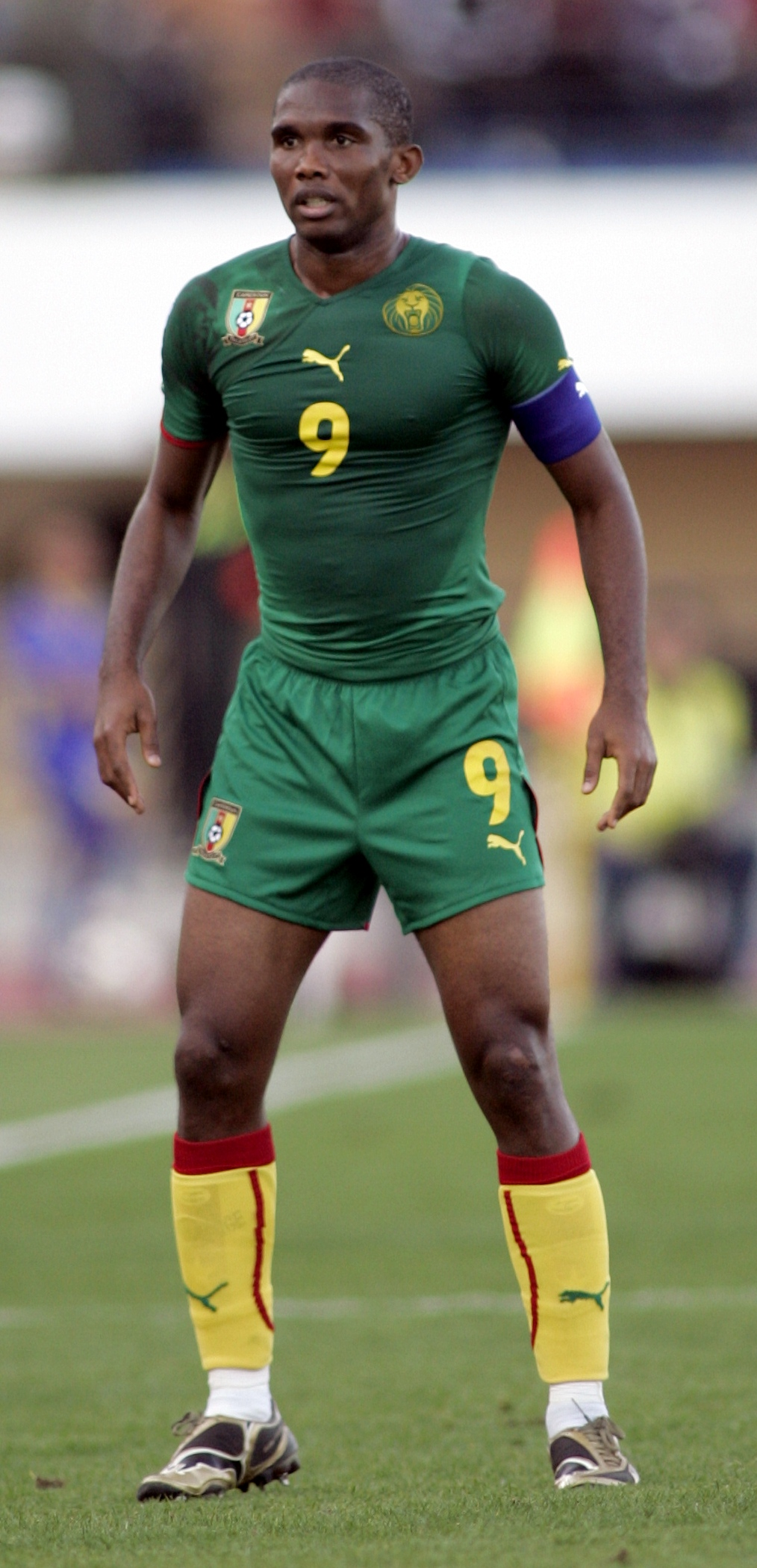
Samuel Eto'o scored a total of 56 goals in 118 caps for Cameroon

Samuel Eto'o is a retired Cameroonian professional footballer who played as a striker for the Cameroon national team from 1997 to 2014. He is currently Cameroon's all-time goalscorer with 56 goals in 118 appearances, which also puts him as his nation's second-most capped player behind Rigobert Song (137). He represented his country at four FIFA World Cups (1998, 2002, 2010, 2014), six Africa Cup of Nations (2000, 2002, 2004, 2006, 2008, 2010), and the 2003 FIFA Confederations Cup.

Eto'o helped Les Lions Indomptables win both the 2000 and 2002 Africa Cup of Nations finals, and also reached the 2003 FIFA Confederations Cup final, which they lost to France.

Eto'o earned his first cap for Cameroon on 9 March 1997 during a 5–0 loss in a friendly against Costa Rica, but did not score his first goal until 2000 in a 3–0 win against the Ivory Coast in a 2000 Africa Cup of Nations group stage match. His only hat-trick while playing for Cameroon would come in a 3–1 win against Angola in a 2006 Africa Cup of Nations group stage match. He eventually decided to retire from international duty in 2014 after joining Everton.

== Goals ==
Scores and results list Cameroon's goal tally first.

No.	Cap	Date	Venue	Opponent	Score	Result	Competition
1	13	28 January 2000	Accra Sports Stadium, Accra, Ghana	Ivory Coast	2–0	3–0	2000 African Cup of Nations
2	14	6 February 2000	Accra Sports Stadium, Accra, Ghana	Algeria	1–0	2–1	2000 African Cup of Nations
3	15	10 February 2000	Accra Sports Stadium, Accra, Ghana	Tunisia	2–0	3–0	2000 African Cup of Nations
4	16	13 February 2000	National Stadium, Lagos, Nigeria	Nigeria	1–0	2–2 (a.e.t.) (4–3 p)	2000 Africa Cup of Nations final
5	17	19 April 2000	Ahmadou Ahidjo Stadium, Yaoundé, Cameroon	Somalia	3–0	3–0	2002 FIFA World Cup qualification
6	20	28 January 2001	Stade de Kégué, Lomé, Togo	Togo	1–0	2–0	2002 FIFA World Cup qualification
7	26	1 July 2001	Ahmadou Ahidjo Stadium, Yaoundé, Cameroon	Togo	1–0	2–0	2002 FIFA World Cup qualification
8	28	7 January 2002	Stade du 4-Août, Ouagadougou, Burkina Faso	Burkina Faso	1–0	3–1	Friendly
9	31	29 January 2002	Stade Babemba Traoré, Sikasso, Mali	Togo	2–0	3–0	2002 African Cup of Nations
10	35	27 March 2002	Charmilles Stadium, Geneva, Switzerland	Argentina	1–1	2–2	Friendly
11	37	26 May 2002	Kobe Universiade Memorial Stadium, Kobe, Japan	England	1–0	2–2	Friendly
12	39	6 June 2002	Saitama Stadium 2002, Saitama, Japan	Saudi Arabia	1–0	1–0	2002 FIFA World Cup
13	42	27 March 2003	7 November Stadium, Radès, Tunisia	Madagascar	2–0	2–0	2003 Tunis Four Nations Tournament
14	44	19 June 2003	Stade de France, Saint-Denis, France	Brazil	1–0	1–0	2003 FIFA Confederations Cup
15	51	8 February 2004	Stade Mustapha Ben Jannet, Monastir, Tunisia	Nigeria	1–2	1–2	2004 African Cup of Nations
16	52	6 June 2004	Ahmadou Ahidjo Stadium, Yaoundé, Cameroon	Benin	1–1	2–1	2006 FIFA World Cup qualification
17	54	4 July 2004	Ahmadou Ahidjo Stadium, Yaoundé, Cameroon	Ivory Coast	1–0	2–0	2006 FIFA World Cup qualification
18	55	5 September 2004	Osman Ahmed Osman Stadium, Cairo, Egypt	Egypt	2–3	2–3	2006 FIFA World Cup qualification
19	59	4 June 2005	Stade de l'Amitié, Cotonou, Benin	Benin	4–0	4–1	2006 FIFA World Cup qualification
20	63	21 January 2006	Cairo Military Academy Stadium, Cairo, Egypt	Angola	1–0	3–1	2006 Africa Cup of Nations
21	63	21 January 2006	Cairo Military Academy Stadium, Cairo, Egypt	Angola	2–1	3–1	2006 Africa Cup of Nations
22	63	21 January 2006	Cairo Military Academy Stadium, Cairo, Egypt	Angola	3–1	3–1	2006 Africa Cup of Nations
23	64	25 January 2006	Cairo Military Academy Stadium, Cairo, Egypt	Togo	1–0	2–0	2006 Africa Cup of Nations
24	65	29 January 2006	Cairo Military Academy Stadium, Cairo, Egypt	DR Congo	2–0	2–0	2006 Africa Cup of Nations
25	69	3 June 2007	Antoinette Tubman Stadium, Monrovia, Liberia	Liberia	2–0	2–1	2008 Africa Cup of Nations qualification
26	71	22 January 2008	Baba Yara Stadium, Kumasi, Ghana	Egypt	1–3	2–4	2008 Africa Cup of Nations
27	71	22 January 2008	Baba Yara Stadium, Kumasi, Ghana	Egypt	2–4	2–4	2008 Africa Cup of Nations
28	72	26 January 2008	Baba Yara Stadium, Kumasi, Ghana	Zambia	4–0	5–1	2008 Africa Cup of Nations
29	73	30 January 2008	Tamale Stadium, Tamale, Ghana	Sudan	1–0	3–0	2008 Africa Cup of Nations
30	73	30 January 2008	Tamale Stadium, Tamale, Ghana	Sudan	3–0	3–0	2008 Africa Cup of Nations
31	77	31 May 2008	Ahmadou Ahidjo Stadium, Yaoundé, Cameroon	Cape Verde	2–0	2–0	2010 FIFA World Cup qualification
32	78	8 June 2008	Stade George V, Curepipe, Mauritius	Mauritius	2–0	3–0	2010 FIFA World Cup qualification
33	80	21 June 2008	Ahmadou Ahidjo Stadium, Yaoundé, Cameroon	Tanzania	1–0	2–1	2010 FIFA World Cup qualification
34	80	21 June 2008	Ahmadou Ahidjo Stadium, Yaoundé, Cameroon	Tanzania	2–1	2–1	2010 FIFA World Cup qualification
35	81	11 October 2008	Ahmadou Ahidjo Stadium, Yaoundé, Cameroon	Mauritius	1–0	5–0	2010 FIFA World Cup qualification
36	81	11 October 2008	Ahmadou Ahidjo Stadium, Yaoundé, Cameroon	Mauritius	2–0	5–0	2010 FIFA World Cup qualification
37	82	11 February 2009	Stade Robert Bobin, Bondoufle, France	Guinea	2–1	3–1	Friendly
38	82	11 February 2009	Stade Robert Bobin, Bondoufle, France	Guinea	3–1	3–1	Friendly
39	86	5 September 2009	Stade Omar Bongo, Libreville, Gabon	Gabon	2–0	2–0	2010 FIFA World Cup qualification
40	87	9 September 2009	Ahmadou Ahidjo Stadium, Yaoundé, Cameroon	Gabon	2–0	2–1	2010 FIFA World Cup qualification
41	89	14 November 2009	Fez Stadium, Fez, Morocco	Morocco	2–0	2–0	2010 FIFA World Cup qualification
42	91	17 January 2010	Estádio Nacional da Tundavala, Lubango, Angola	Zambia	2–1	3–2	2010 Africa Cup of Nations
43	92	21 January 2010	Estádio Nacional da Tundavala, Lubango, Angola	Tunisia	1–1	2–2	2010 Africa Cup of Nations
44	97	19 June 2010	Loftus Versfeld Stadium, Pretoria, South Africa	Denmark	1–0	1–2	2010 FIFA World Cup
45	98	24 June 2010	Cape Town Stadium, Cape Town, South Africa	Netherlands	1–1	1–2	2010 FIFA World Cup
46	99	11 August 2010	Stadion Poznań, Poznań, Poland	Poland	1–0	3–0	Friendly
47	99	11 August 2010	Stadion Poznań, Poznań, Poland	Poland	2–0	3–0	Friendly
48	100	4 September 2010	Anjalay Stadium, Belle Vue Harel, Mauritius	Mauritius	1–0	3–1	2012 Africa Cup of Nations qualification
49	100	4 September 2010	Anjalay Stadium, Belle Vue Harel, Mauritius	Mauritius	2–1	3–1	2012 Africa Cup of Nations qualification
50	106	3 September 2011	Ahmadou Ahidjo Stadium, Yaoundé, Cameroon	Mauritius	3–0	6–0	2012 Africa Cup of Nations qualification
51	107	7 October 2011	Stade des Martyrs, Kinshasa, DR Congo	DR Congo	1–1	3–2	2012 Africa Cup of Nations qualification
52	108	11 November 2011	Stade de Marrakech, Marrakesh, Morocco	Sudan	3–1	3–1	2011 LG Cup
53	109	13 November 2011	Stade de Marrakech, Marrakesh, Morocco	Morocco	1–0	1–1 (a.e.t.) (4–2 p)	2011 LG Cup
54	112	23 March 2013	Ahmadou Ahidjo Stadium, Yaoundé, Cameroon	Togo	1–0	2–1	2014 FIFA World Cup qualification
55	112	23 March 2013	Ahmadou Ahidjo Stadium, Yaoundé, Cameroon	Togo	2–1	2–1	2014 FIFA World Cup qualification
56	117	1 June 2014	Borussia-Park, Mönchengladbach, Germany	Germany	1–0	2–2	Friendly

== Statistics ==
Goals by year
Year	Goals
2000	5
2001	2
2002	5
2003	2
2004	4
2005	1
2006	5
2007	1
2008	11
2009	5
2010	8
2011	4
2013	2
2014	1
Total	56

Goals by competition
Competition	Goals
Friendlies	8
FIFA World Cup qualification	18
Africa Cup of Nations tournaments	18
Africa Cup of Nations qualification	5
FIFA World Cup finals	3
FIFA Confederations Cup	1
Other tournaments	3
Total	56
