= Sergio Arribas =

Sergio Arribas may refer to:

- Sergio Arribas (footballer, born 1995), Spanish football attacking midfielder
- Sergio Arribas (footballer, born 2001), Spanish football attacking midfielder
- Sergio Arribas (footballer, born 2003), Spanish football left-back
