= Nordin Amrabat =

Moroccan footballer (born 1987)

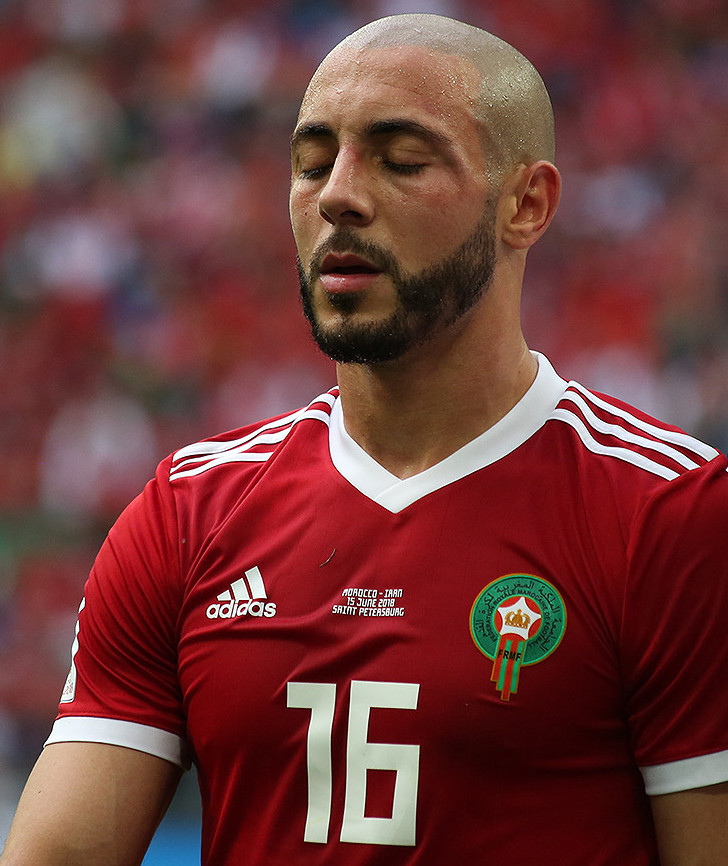
- Amrabat with Morocco at the 2018 FIFA World Cup

Personal information
- Full name: Noureddine Amrabat
- Date of birth: 31 March 1987 (age 39)
- Place of birth: Naarden, Netherlands
- Height: 1.79 m (5 ft 10 in)
- Position: Winger

Team information
- Current team: Utrecht
- Number: 39

Youth career
- 1996–1999: De Zuidvogels
- 1999–2003: Ajax
- 2003–2005: De Zuidvogels
- 2005–2006: Huizen
- 2006: Ajax

Senior career*
Years	Team	Apps	(Gls)
2006–2007	Omniworld	36	(14)
2007–2008	VVV	33	(10)
2008–2011	PSV	56	(9)
2011–2012	Kayserispor	38	(6)
2012–2015	Galatasaray	34	(1)
2014	→ Málaga (loan)	15	(2)
2014–2015	→ Málaga (loan)	31	(6)
2015–2016	Málaga	13	(0)
2016–2018	Watford	44	(0)
2017–2018	→ Leganés (loan)	30	(2)
2018–2021	Al-Nassr	80	(15)
2021–2025	AEK Athens	93	(21)
2025	Hull City	10	(0)
2025–2026	Wydad	27	(2)
2026–	Utrecht	1	(0)

International career^{‡}
2007–2008	Netherlands U21	7	(0)
2012	Morocco Olympic	3	(0)
2011–2019	Morocco	64	(7)
- * Club domestic league appearances and goals as of 22:01, 18 October 2026 (UTC) ‡ National team caps and goals as of 19 November 2019

Noureddine "Nordin" Amrabat (Arabic: نورالدين أمرابط, Berber languages: ⵏⵓⵕⴷⴷⵉⵏ ⴰⵎⵕⴰⴱⵟ; born 31 March 1987) is a professional footballer who plays as a winger and captains Eredivisie club Utrecht. Born in the Netherlands, Amrabat played for the Morocco national team, which he represented at two Africa Cup of Nations, the 2012 Olympics, and the 2018 FIFA World Cup.

== Early life ==
Born to Moroccan-Riffian parents in Naarden, North Holland, after joining Ajax, Amrabat was released from Ajax at age 13, having suffered stunted growth due to Osgood Schlatter disease. His father recommended Amrabat play at the amateur level while studying for a different profession. He washed dishes, made desserts and vacuum cleaned his school while playing for SV Huizen in Huizen. At age 17, he planned to study management, Economics and Law.

== Club career ==
=== Early career ===
After making his study plans, Amrabat was signed by Almere's Omniworld of the Eerste Divisie, contributing 14 goals and as many assists in 36 matches. In 2007, he joined newly promoted Eredivisie club VVV, scoring ten times in 33 matches. One year later, national champions PSV signed him for €2 million, and he represented them in the UEFA Champions League. Amrabat spent three years at the Philips Stadion, before moving abroad for the first time to Turkey's Kayserispor.

=== Galatasaray ===
On 12 July 2012, Amrabat signed for fellow Turkish club Galatasaray for a fee of €8.6 million on a five-year contract (€600,000 went to PSV; Kayserispor retained 10%, valued at €800,000). Amrabat made his debut on 12 August 2012 in the 2012 Turkish Super Cup against rivals Fenerbahçe, coming on as a substitute in the 70th minute as the match ended 3–2, with Galatasaray winning the title for the 12th time. On 15 September 2012, Galatasaray manager Fatih Terim picked Amrabat for the starting XI for a match against Antalyaspor, and he duly scored his first goal for Galatasaray in the 2012–13 Süper Lig and provided an assist in a 4–0 triumph.

=== Málaga ===
In January 2014, Amrabat joined Málaga on a six-month loan deal. On 10 March, he scored his first goal for the club, in a 2–0 away win against Osasuna, and on 6 April, he converted a penalty in a 4–1 derby victory over Granada. Fifteen days later, having earlier assisted Sergi Darder's goal, he received a straight red card in a 2–0 home win against Villarreal for gesturing that referee Álvarez Izquierdo needed glasses.

In August 2014, Amrabat agreed to extend his stay in Andalusia for the full season. On 30 April of the following year, he was purchased outright for a €3.5 million fee. His permanent spell on the Costa del Sol was less prolific than the temporary one, playing twelve matches without scoring.

=== Watford ===
On 18 January 2016, Amrabat joined Premier League club Watford for a £6.1 million transfer fee. He made his debut five days later, replacing Troy Deeney at the end of a 2–1 win over Newcastle United at Vicarage Road.

On 1 September 2017, Amrabat returned to Spain after agreeing to a one-year loan deal with Leganés.

=== Al Nassr ===
On 16 July 2018, Amrabat signed a three-year contract with the Saudi Pro League side Al-Nassr. In the 2018–19 season, he won league title with his team. He scored five goals and he had the highest assist number in the season along with his teammate Abderrazak Hamdallah.

=== AEK Athens ===
On 16 August 2021, Amrabat signed a two-year contract with Greek Super League club AEK Athens.

On 12 September 2021, he scored a penalty to put his team two goals up against Ionikos, in the opening game of the league for his team, which ended 3–0 for the hosts.

=== Hull City ===
On 17 January 2025, Amrabat returned to England, joining Championship side Hull City on a short-term deal until the end of the season. He made his debut on 18 January 2025, as an 82nd-minute substitute for Abu Kamara in the 1–0 away win against Millwall.

=== Wydad ===
On 25 May 2025, Amrabat joined Botola side Wydad ahead of their participation in the 2025 FIFA Club World Cup.

== International career ==
Amrabat was expected to take part in the 2008 Olympic football tournament with the Netherlands but he and fellow PSV (and future Moroccan) teammate Ismaïl Aissati both failed to make the final squad.

In November 2011, Amrabat decided to play for Morocco. On 11 November 2011, he made his debut with the Atlas Lions of Morocco against Uganda in a 0–1 loss in the LG Cup. Two days later, he scored his first international goal in a friendly match against Cameroon as the match ended 1–1.

Amrabat was selected to compete at the 2012 Olympics for the Moroccan team, starting all three of their matches in another group stage exit. He also started their first two matches as they fell at the same point in the 2013 Africa Cup of Nations.

In May 2018, he was named in Morocco's 23-man squad for the 2018 FIFA World Cup in Russia. Amrabat started all 3 of Morocco's matches as they were eliminated at the group stage. The Moroccan coaching team were heavily criticised by FIFA and others after allowing Amrabat to play in Morocco's second group game against Portugal, despite having received a concussion and coming off early in their first game against Iran.

== Personal life ==
Amrabat's younger brother Sofyan Amrabat is a fellow professional footballer who plays for AFC Ajax in the Eredivisie at the club level and Morocco at the international level.

== Career statistics ==
=== Club ===
As of 18 October 2026.

Appearances and goals by club, season and competition
Club	Season	League			National cup (Note: Includes KNVB Cup, Turkish Cup, Copa del Rey, FA Cup, King Cup, Greek Football Cup)		League cup (Note: Includes EFL Cup)		Continental		Other		Total	
Club	Season	Division	Apps	Goals	Apps	Goals	Apps	Goals	Apps	Goals	Apps	Goals	Apps	Goals
Omniworld	2006–07	Eerste Divisie	36	14	1	1	—		—		—		37	15
VVV	2007–08	Eredivisie	33	10	0	0	—		—		—		33	10
PSV	2008–09	Eredivisie	25	5	1	0	—		3 (Note: Appearances in UEFA Champions League)	0	1 (Note: Appearance in Johan Cruyff Shield)	0	30	5
PSV	2009–10	Eredivisie	25	3	3	1	—		4 (Note: Appearances in UEFA Europa League)	1	—		32	5
PSV	2010–11	Eredivisie	6	1	2	1	—		5	0	—		13	2
PSV	Total		56	9	6	2	—		12	1	1	0	75	12
Kayserispor	2010–11	Süper Lig	14	1	0	0	—		—		—		14	1
Kayserispor	2011–12	Süper Lig	24	5	2	1	—		—		—		26	6
Kayserispor	Total		38	6	2	1	—		—		—		40	7
Galatasaray	2012–13	Süper Lig	30	1	2	0	—		10	0	1 (Note: Appearance in Turkish Super Cup)	0	43	1
Galatasaray	2013–14	Süper Lig	4	0	3	2	—		5	0	1	0	13	2
Galatasaray	Total		34	1	5	2	—		15	0	2	0	56	3
Málaga (loan)	2013–14	La Liga	15	2	—		—		—		—		15	2
Málaga (loan)	2014–15	La Liga	31	6	4	0	—		—		—		35	6
Málaga (loan)	Total		46	8	4	0	—		—		—		50	8
Málaga	2015–16	La Liga	13	0	1	0	—		—		—		14	0
Watford	2015–16	Premier League	12	0	3	0	—		—		—		15	0
Watford	2016–17	Premier League	29	0	0	0	0	0	—		—		29	0
Watford	2017–18	Premier League	3	0	0	0	1	0	—		—		4	0
Watford	Total		44	0	3	0	1	0	—		—		48	0
Leganés (loan)	2017–18	La Liga	30	2	5	1	—		—		—		35	3
Al-Nassr	2018–19	Saudi Pro League	26	5	2	0	—		2 (Note: Appearances in AFC Champions League)	0	—		30	5
Al-Nassr	2019–20	Saudi Pro League	29	4	4	1	—		2	0	1 (Note: Appearance in Saudi Super Cup)	0	36	5
Al-Nassr	2020–21	Saudi Pro League	25	6	3	1	—		5	0	1	0	34	7
Al-Nassr	Total		80	15	8	1	—		9	0	2	0	100	17
AEK Athens	2021–22	Super League Greece	29	6	2	0	—		—		—		31	6
AEK Athens	2022–23	Super League Greece	31	8	3	0	—		—		—		34	8
AEK Athens	2023–24	Super League Greece	27	6	2	0	—		10 (Note: Four appearances in UEFA Champions League, six appearances in UEFA Europa Conference League)	0	—		39	6
AEK Athens	2024–25	Super League Greece	6	1	0	0	—		3 (Note: Appearances in UEFA Conference League)	1	—		9	2
AEK Athens	Total		93	21	7	0	—		13	1	—		113	22
Hull City	2024–25	Championship	10	0	0	0	—		—		—		10	0
Wydad	2024–25	Botola Pro	—		—		—		—		3 (Note: Appearances in FIFA Club World Cup)	0	3	0
Wydad	2025–26	Botola Pro	27	2	1	1	—		7 (Note: Appearances in CAF Confederations Cup)	1	—		35	4
Wydad	Total		27	2	1	1	—		7	1	3	0	38	4
Utrecht	2026–27	Eredivisie	1	0	0	0	—		—		—		1	0
Career total			541	86	44	10	1	0	56	3	8	0	650	101

=== International ===
As of match played 19 November 2019

Morocco
Year	Apps	Goals
2011	2	1
2012	9	1
2013	6	0
2014	6	1
2015	3	1
2016	8	0
2017	6	0
2018	12	1
2019	12	2
Total	64	7

Scores and results list Morocco's goal tally first.

No	Date	Venue	Opponent	Score	Result	Competition
1.	13 November 2011	Stade de Marrakech, Marrakesh, Morocco	Cameroon	1–1	1–1 (2–4 pen.)	2011 LG Cup
2.	13 October 2012	Stade de Marrakech, Marrakesh, Morocco	Mozambique	4–0	4–0	2013 Africa Cup of Nations qualification
3.	13 November 2014	Stade Adrar, Agadir, Morocco	Benin	1–0	6–1	Friendly
4.	5 September 2015	Estádio Nacional 12 de Julho, São Tomé, São Tomé and Príncipe	São Tomé and Príncipe	1–0	3–0	2017 Africa Cup of Nations qualification
5.	16 October 2018	Stade Said Mohamed Cheikh, Mitsamiouli, Comoros	Comoros	2–1	2–2	2019 Africa Cup of Nations qualification
6.	15 October 2019	Stade Ibn Batouta, Tangier, Morocco	Gabon	1–1	2–3	Friendly
7.	15 October 2019	Stade Ibn Batouta, Tangier, Morocco	Gabon	2–2	2–3	Friendly

== Honours ==
PSV Eindhoven

- Johan Cruyff Shield: 2008

Galatasaray

- Süper Lig: 2012–13
- Turkish Cup: 2013–14
- Turkish Super Cup: 2012, 2013

Al Nassr

- Saudi Pro League: 2018–19
- Saudi Super Cup: 2019, 2020

AEK Athens

- Super League Greece: 2022–23
- Greek Cup: 2022–23

Individual

- Saudi Pro League Top assist provider: 2018–19
