= Joseba Zaldúa =

Spanish footballer (born 1992)

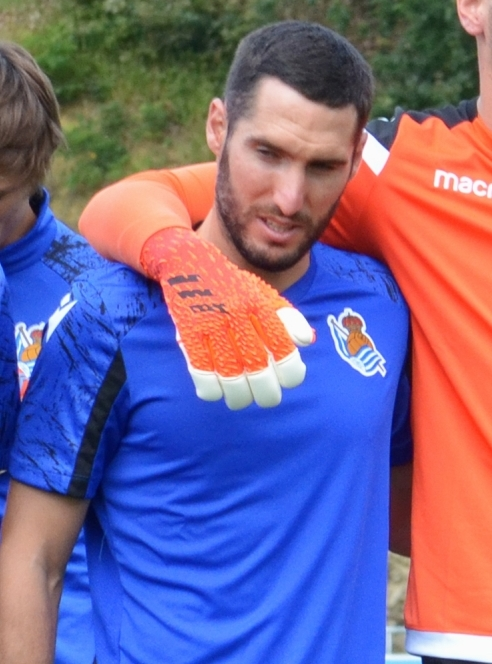
- Zaldúa training with Real Sociedad in 2021

Personal information
- Full name: Joseba Zaldúa Bengoetxea
- Date of birth: 24 June 1992 (age 34)
- Place of birth: San Sebastián, Spain
- Height: 1.76 m (5 ft 9 in)
- Position: Right-back

Youth career
- Real Sociedad

Senior career*
Years	Team	Apps	(Gls)
2010–2014	Real Sociedad B	67	(2)
2013–2022	Real Sociedad	152	(1)
2017–2018	→ Leganés (loan)	30	(1)
2022–2025	Cádiz	44	(0)

International career
2016	Basque Country	2	(0)
- * Club domestic league appearances and goals as of 20 June 2025

Joseba Zaldúa Bengoetxea (born 24 June 1992) is a Spanish professional footballer who plays as a right-back.

== Club career ==
=== Real Sociedad ===
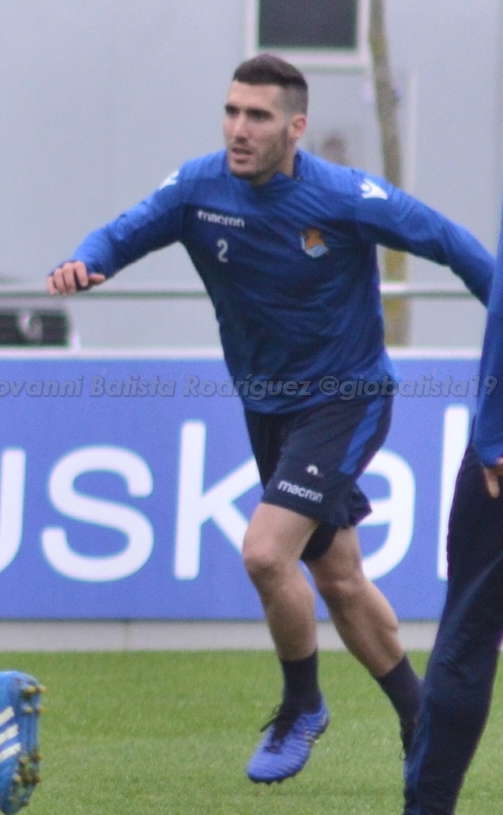
Zaldúa training with Real Sociedad in 2018

Born in San Sebastián, Gipuzkoa, Zaldúa played his youth football with local Real Sociedad. He made his senior debut with the reserves, spending several seasons in the Segunda División B with them.

Zaldúa appeared in his first official match with the main squad on 23 November 2013, featuring the first 80 minutes before being substituted for Javi Ros in a 4–3 La Liga home win against RC Celta de Vigo. Roughly a month later, he signed a new deal with the Basques until 2016.

On 20 May 2014, Zaldúa renewed his contract with the Txuri-urdin until 2018, and was definitely promoted to the first team. On 4 July 2017, he was loaned to fellow top-flight club CD Leganés for one year. He made 30 appearances as the side from the outskirts of Madrid avoided relegation, and scored a last-minute equaliser in a 2–2 draw at Deportivo Alavés on 21 January 2018. On 7 May, he was sent off in a 3–0 home loss to Levante UD for denying José Luis Morales a goalscoring opportunity.

Zaldúa scored his only goal for Real Sociedad on 12 May 2019 in a 3–1 victory over Real Madrid at Anoeta Stadium, but was replaced in the same game with a broken left leg. He totalled 190 matches during his spell.

=== Cádiz ===
On 11 July 2022, Zaldúa joined Cádiz CF on a three-year contract. He spent the vast majority of his first season on the sidelines, nursing a serious knee injury.

== Career statistics ==
As of match played 25 May 2024

Appearances and goals by club, season and competition
Club	Season	League			National Cup		Continental		Other		Total	
Club	Season	Division	Apps	Goals	Apps	Goals	Apps	Goals	Apps	Goals	Apps	Goals
Real Sociedad B	2010–11	Segunda División B	1	0	—		—		—		1	0
Real Sociedad B	2011–12	Segunda División B	20	1	—		—		—		20	1
Real Sociedad B	2012–13	Segunda División B	32	1	—		—		—		32	1
Real Sociedad B	2013–14	Segunda División B	14	0	—		—		—		14	0
Real Sociedad B	Total		67	2	0	0	0	0	0	0	67	2
Real Sociedad	2013–14	La Liga	10	0	7	0	0	0	—		17	0
Real Sociedad	2014–15	La Liga	23	0	1	0	4 (Note: Appearances in UEFA Europa League)	0	—		28	0
Real Sociedad	2015–16	La Liga	13	0	0	0	—		—		13	0
Real Sociedad	2016–17	La Liga	14	0	3	0	—		—		17	0
Real Sociedad	2018–19	La Liga	26	1	3	0	—		—		29	1
Real Sociedad	2019–20	La Liga	30	0	3	0	—		—		33	0
Real Sociedad	2020–21	La Liga	12	0	1	0	4	0	1 (Note: Appearance in Supercopa de España)	0	18	0
Real Sociedad	2021–22	La Liga	24	0	4	0	7	0	—		35	0
Real Sociedad	Total		152	1	22	0	15	0	1	0	190	1
Leganés (loan)	2017–18	La Liga	30	1	0	0	—		—		30	1
Cádiz	2022–23	La Liga	10	0	0	0	—		—		10	0
Cádiz	2023–24	La Liga	13	0	2	0	—		—		15	0
Cádiz	Total		23	0	2	0	0	0	0	0	25	0
Career total			272	4	24	0	15	0	1	0	312	4

== Honours ==
Real Sociedad

- Copa del Rey: 2019–20
