= Diego Rico =

Spanish footballer (born 1993)

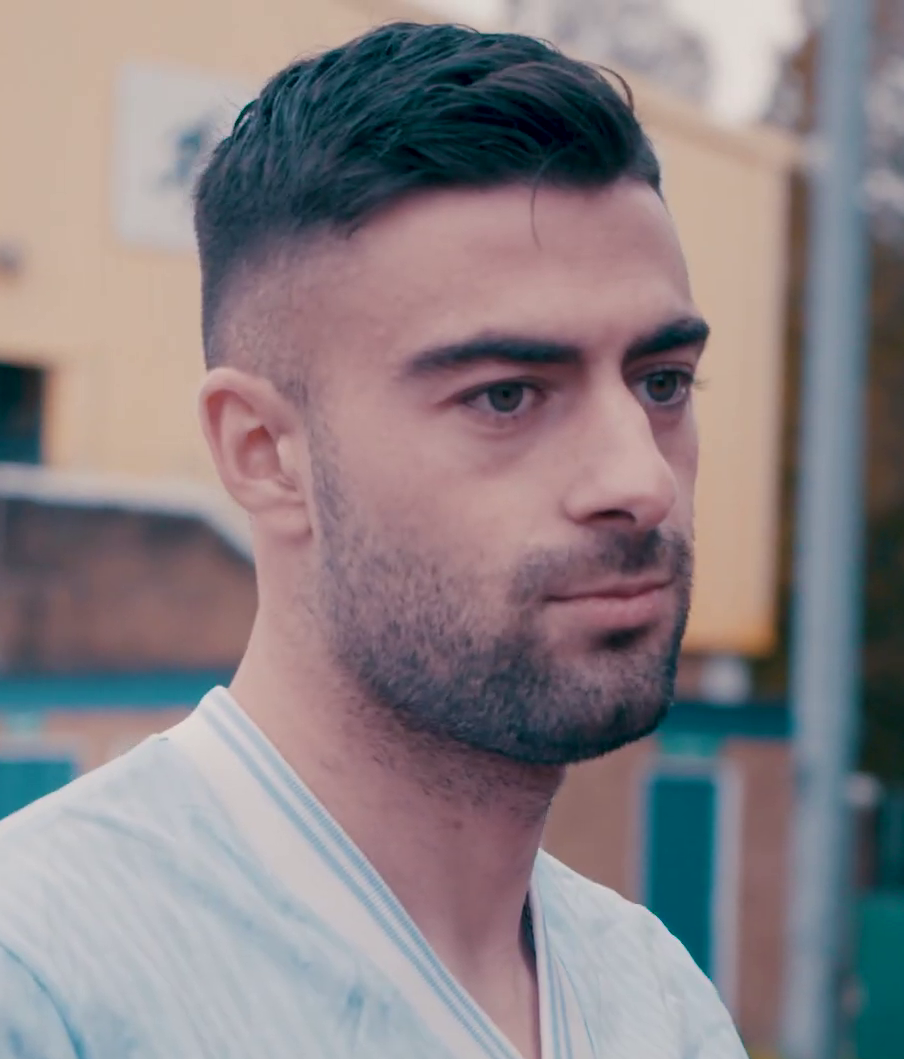
- Rico in 2019

Personal information
- Full name: Diego Rico Salguero
- Date of birth: 23 February 1993 (age 33)
- Place of birth: Burgos, Spain
- Height: 1.80 m (5 ft 11 in)
- Position: Left-back

Team information
- Current team: Osasuna

Youth career
- 2000–2011: Burgos Promesas
- 2011–2012: Zaragoza

Senior career*
Years	Team	Apps	(Gls)
2012–2013	Zaragoza B	17	(0)
2013–2016	Zaragoza	106	(5)
2016–2018	Leganés	51	(3)
2018–2021	AFC Bournemouth	71	(1)
2021–2024	Real Sociedad	41	(0)
2023–2024	→ Getafe (loan)	32	(0)
2024–2026	Getafe	61	(0)
2026–	Osasuna	0	(0)
- * Club domestic league appearances and goals as of 21:51, 31 May 2026 (UTC)

Diego Rico Salguero (born 23 February 1993) is a Spanish professional footballer who plays as a left-back for La Liga club Osasuna.

== Club career ==
=== Zaragoza ===
Born in Burgos, Castile and León, Rico graduated from local CD Burgos Promesas 2000's youth system, where he started playing as a forward in the seven-a-side variation and later winger. In June 2011, he joined Real Zaragoza and was assigned to the Juvenil squad.

Rico made his senior debut with the reserves, in 2011–12. He served mostly as a backup in his two seasons with the squad, the second ending in relegation.

In the summer of 2013, Rico was promoted to the main squad and quickly overtook the habitual starter Abraham Minero. On 10 September he played his first match as a professional, starting in a 1–0 away loss against Deportivo Alavés in the second round of the Copa del Rey. He first appeared in the league four days later, playing the full 90 minutes of a 3–0 home victory over CD Tenerife in the Segunda División.

On 19 November 2013, Rico signed a five-year contract to stay at La Romareda. He scored his first professional goal the following month, the first of a 2–1 home win against Córdoba CF.

Rico agreed to a new professional deal on 7 January 2016, becoming a full member of the first team and being assigned the no. 22 jersey. He finished the campaign with one goal in 39 matches, contributing to an eighth-place finish (they were placed fourth before the last fixture).

=== Leganés ===
On 17 August 2016, Rico joined La Liga side CD Leganés on a four-year contract for a rumoured fee of €1 million. He made his debut in the competition five days later, starting and in a 1–0 away win against RC Celta de Vigo.

Rico scored his first goal in the Spanish top flight on 11 September 2016, but in a 2–1 loss at Sporting de Gijón. The following 7 August, he agreed to an extension until 2021.

=== AFC Bournemouth ===
On 24 July 2018, Rico was transferred to AFC Bournemouth for an undisclosed fee, and signed a four-year contract. He made his debut in the Premier League on 1 September, playing the entire 2–0 away defeat against Chelsea. He struggled to regularly cement his position in the team during his first season, making just 16 total appearances in all competitions; manager Eddie Howe later commented that the player had faced some hurdles in settling into the league, with the language barrier and increased physicality of the competition being key factors in this, although he did add that "he has got the technical quality and [he] has got a lovely left foot. He’s got the ability to play in the team".

Rico enjoyed a much more positive start to the following campaign, making 14 consecutive starts for the team, beginning with a 3–1 home win against Everton. In October 2019, he was voted Player of the Month for the previous month in a poll conducted by the club's website, playing every minute in the league and also providing two assists.

Rico scored his first goal on 4 December 2020, in a 4–0 victory over Barnsley.

=== Real Sociedad ===
On 26 July 2021, Rico returned to Spain and joined Real Sociedad, on a two-year deal for an undisclosed fee. On 6 March 2023, he renewed his contract until 2025.

=== Getafe ===
Rico moved to fellow top-tier Getafe CF on 1 September 2023, on loan for the season. In July 2024, he signed a permanent contract due to an obligatory buyout clause if the team avoided relegation.

Rico made 100 total appearances during his spell. On 15 January 2025, he was sent off against Pontevedra CF in the Spanish Cup (1–0 away win) and, three months later, repeated the feat in the in the 1–3 home loss to UD Las Palmas in the domestic league.

=== Osasuna ===
On 12 August 2026, Rico joined CA Osasuna on a one-year deal.

== Style of play ==
Rico is praised for his dead-ball delivery and the quality of his set pieces, and is usually assigned the role of corner and direct free kick taker on the pitch. Bournemouth teammate Callum Wilson described him as having a "wand of a left foot", and Howe commented that "someone with that strength of foot, he has real power in it, accuracy with it and it is a big asset.”

Rico is also noted as being an excellent interceptor of the ball, and a generally strong defensive fullback. Late into 2019–20, he had the most interceptions of any player in the Premier League with 66.

== Career statistics ==
As of match played 18 May 2024

Club	Season	League			National cup (Note: Includes Copa del Rey, FA Cup)		League cup (Note: Includes EFL Cup)		Europe		Other		Total	
Club	Season	Division	Apps	Goals	Apps	Goals	Apps	Goals	Apps	Goals	Apps	Goals	Apps	Goals
Zaragoza B	2011–12	Segunda División B	6	0	—		—		—		—		6	0
Zaragoza B	2012–13	Segunda División B	11	0	—		—		—		—		11	0
Zaragoza B	Total		17	0	—		—		—		—		17	0
Zaragoza	2013–14	Segunda División	30	2	1	0	—		—		—		31	2
Zaragoza	2014–15	Segunda División	33	1	1	0	—		—		4 (Note: Appearances in La Liga play-offs)	1	38	2
Zaragoza	2015–16	Segunda División	39	1	1	0	—		—		—		40	1
Zaragoza	Total		102	4	3	0	—		—		4	1	109	5
Leganés	2016–17	La Liga	25	1	0	0	—		—		—		25	1
Leganés	2017–18	La Liga	26	2	7	1	—		—		—		33	3
Leganés	Total		51	3	7	1	—		—		—		58	4
Bournemouth	2018–19	Premier League	12	0	1	0	3	0	—		—		16	0
Bournemouth	2019–20	Premier League	27	0	1	0	1	0	—		—		29	0
Bournemouth	2020–21	Championship	32	1	4	0	1	0	—		1 (Note: Appearance in EFL Championship play-offs)	0	38	1
Bournemouth	Total		71	1	6	0	5	0	—		1	0	83	1
Real Sociedad	2021–22	La Liga	21	0	3	0	—		2 (Note: Appearances in UEFA Europa League)	0	—		26	0
Real Sociedad	2022–23	La Liga	20	0	4	0	—		7	1	—		26	1
Real Sociedad	Total		41	0	7	0	—		9	1	—		57	1
Getafe (loan)	2023–24	La Liga	32	0	3	0	—		—		—		35	0
Career total			314	8	26	1	5	0	9	1	5	1	359	11
