= 2011 LG Cup (Morocco) =

2011 LG Cup Africa

Tournament details
- Host country: Morocco
- City: Marrakesh
- Dates: 11–13 November
- Teams: 4
- Venue: 1 (in 1 host city)

Final positions
- Champions: Cameroon (1st title)
- Runners-up: Uganda
- Third place: Morocco
- Fourth place: Sudan

Tournament statistics
- Matches played: 4
- Goals scored: 7 (1.75 per match)
- Top scorer: (Cameroon) Samuel Eto'o (2 goals)

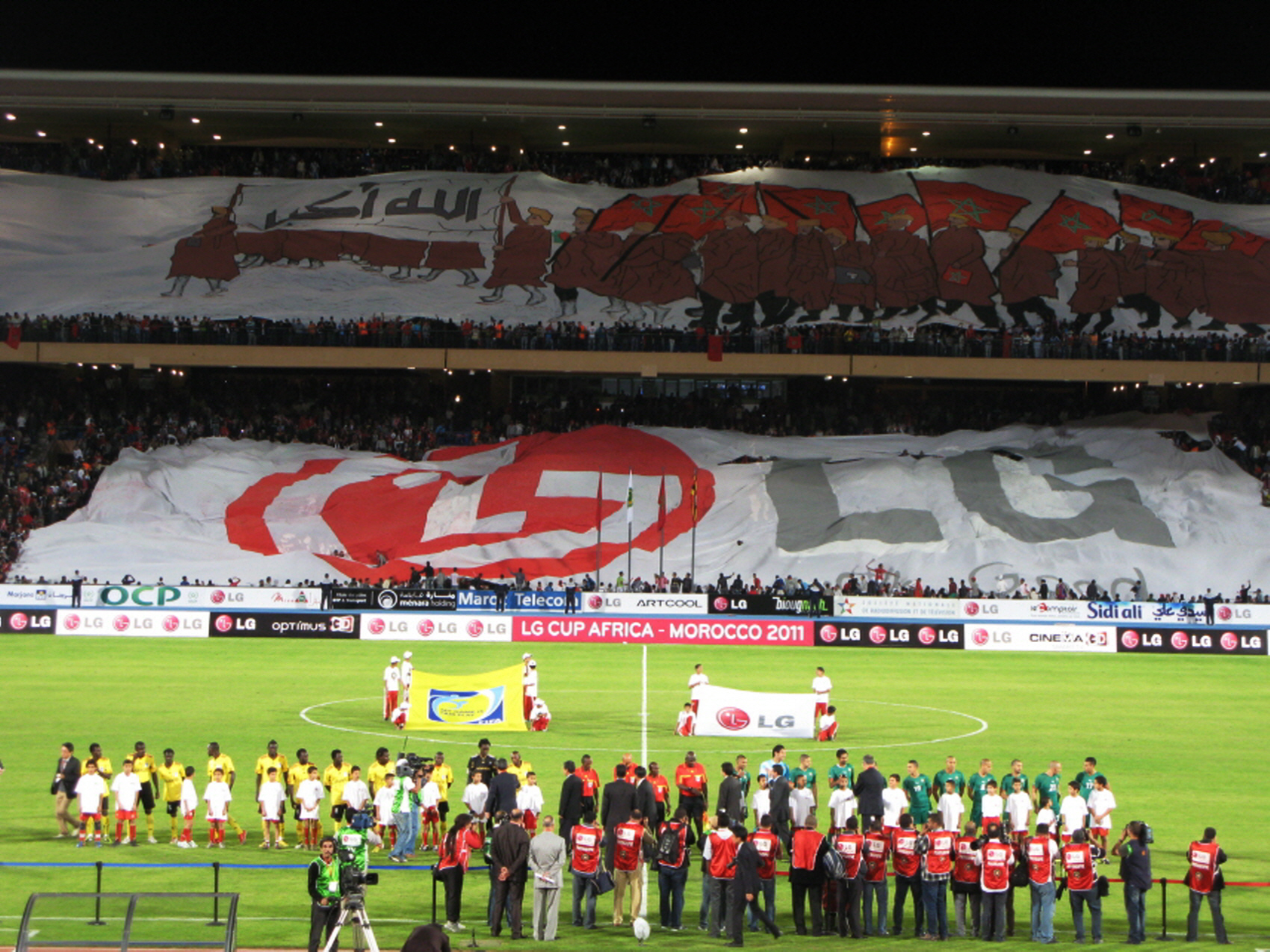
LG Cup 2011

The LG Cup Africa is an exhibition association football tournament that took place in Marrakesh, Morocco.

The participants were:

- Cameroon
- Morocco
- Sudan
- Uganda

== Final table ==
Team	Pld	W	D	L	GF	GA	GD	Pts
Cameroon	2	1	1	0	4	2	2	4
Uganda	2	1	1	0	1	0	1	4
Morocco	2	0	1	1	1	2	–1	1
Sudan	2	0	1	1	1	3	–2	1

== Results ==
11 November
17:30

Cameroon	3–1	Sudan
Enoh 32'; Angbwa 35'; Eto'o 82'	report	El Tahir 74' (pen.)

Stade de Marrakech
11 November
20:30

Morocco	0–1	Uganda
	report	Sserumaga 47'

Stade de Marrakech
13 November
16:00

Sudan	0–0	Uganda
	report
Penalties
	2–3

Stade de Marrakech
13 November
18:45

Morocco	1–1	Cameroon
Amrabat 90'	report	Eto'o 73'
Penalties
	2–4

Stade de Marrakech

== Winner ==
2011 LG Cup Winners
Cameroon
1st Title

== Scorers ==
2 goals

- (Cameroon) Samuel Eto'o

1 goal

- (Cameroon) Eyong Enoh
- (Cameroon) Benoît Angbwa
- (Morocco) Nordin Amrabat
- (Sudan) Muhannad El Tahir
- (Uganda) Mike Sserumaga
