= Álex Mozo =

Spanish footballer

Personal information
- Full name: Alejandro Gutiérrez Mozo
- Date of birth: 22 April 1995 (age 31)
- Place of birth: Cuenca, Spain
- Height: 1.72 m (5 ft 8 in)
- Position: Midfielder

Youth career
- Coslada
- Alcalá
- 2014: Leganés

Senior career*
Years	Team	Apps	(Gls)
2013–2014	Alcalá	12	
2014–2015	Leganés B	36	(6)
2015–2016	Conquense	32	(3)
2016–2018	Leganés B	57	(9)
2018	Leganés	1	(0)
2019	Arandina	14	(1)
2019–2020	Móstoles URJC		
2020–2021	Arandina		
2021–2022	Conquense		
- * Club domestic league appearances and goals as of 19:33, 20 November 2023 (UTC)

Alejandro "Álex" Gutiérrez Mozo (born 22 April 1995) is a Spanish footballer who plays as a central midfielder.

== Club career ==
Born in Madrid, Spain, Mozo represented CD Coslada and RSD Alcalá as a youth. He made his senior debut with the latter during the 2013–14 season in Tercera División, but after appearing sparingly he moved to CD Leganés in January 2014, returning to youth setup.

Mozo featured regularly with the reserves in the following years, helping in their promotion to the fourth tier in 2015. On 1 September of that year, he moved to fellow fourth division side UB Conquense.

After narrowly missing out promotion, Mozo returned to Leganés and its B-team. He made his first team – and La Liga – debut on 28 February 2018, coming on as a half-time substitute for Gabriel Pires in a 0–4 away loss against Atlético Madrid.
