= Samuel Eto'o =

Cameroonian footballer (born 1981)

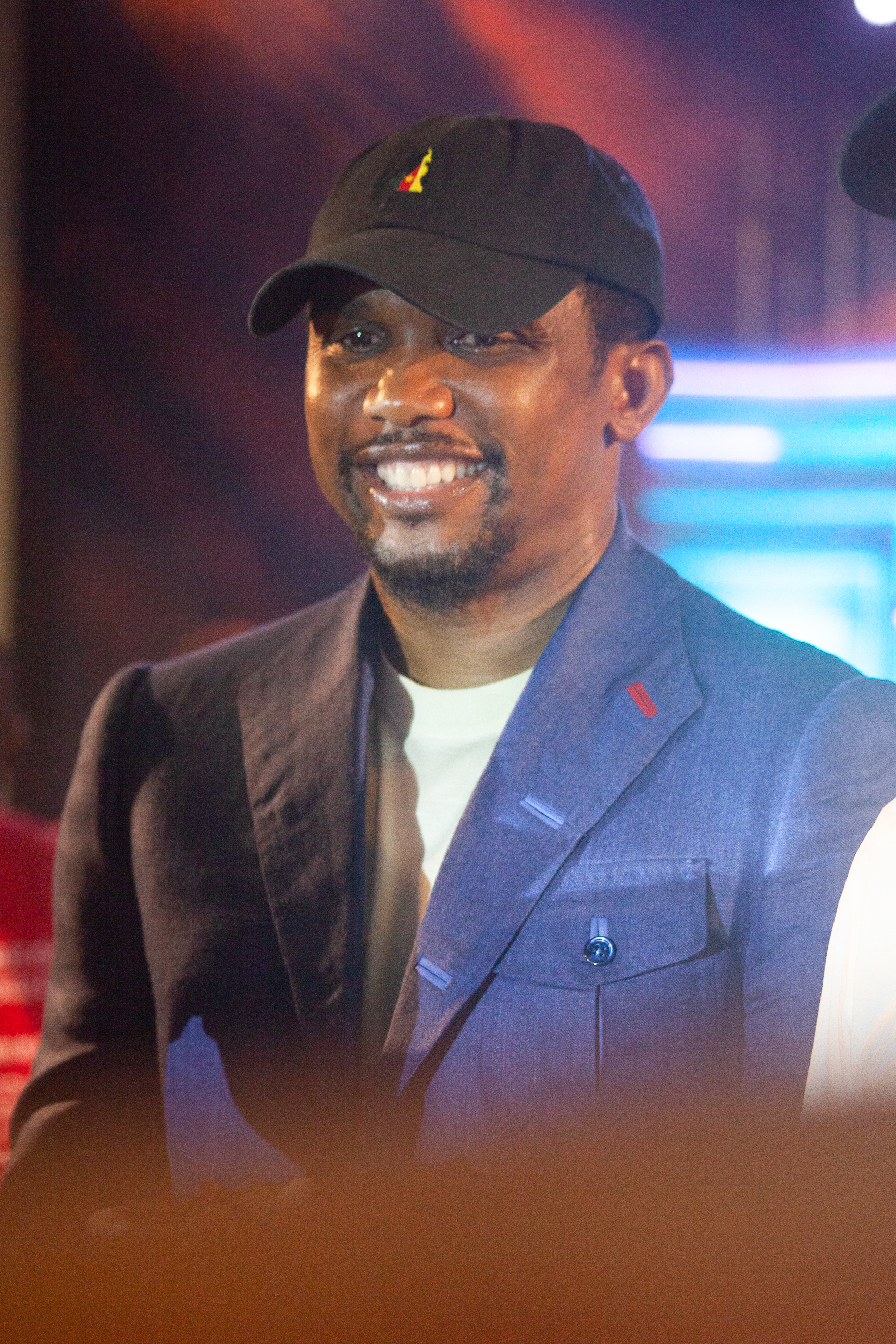
- Eto'o in 2023

President of Cameroonian Football Federation
- Incumbent
- Assumed office 11 December 2021
- Preceded by: Seidou Mbombo Njoya

Personal details
- Born: Samuel Eto'o Fils; 10 March 1981 (age 45) Douala, Cameroon
- Height: 1.80 m (5 ft 11 in)
- Occupation: Footballer; Football administrator
Association football career
- Position: Striker
Youth career
- 1992–1996: Kadji Sports Academy
- 1996–1997: Real Madrid
Senior career*
Years	Team	Apps	(Gls)
1997–2000	Real Madrid	3	(0)
1997–1998	→ Leganés (loan)	28	(3)
1999	→ Espanyol (loan)	0	(0)
2000	→ Mallorca (loan)	13	(6)
2000–2004	Mallorca	120	(48)
2004–2009	Barcelona	144	(108)
2009–2011	Inter Milan	67	(33)
2011–2013	Anzhi Makhachkala	53	(25)
2013–2014	Chelsea	21	(9)
2014–2015	Everton	14	(3)
2015	Sampdoria	18	(2)
2015–2018	Antalyaspor	76	(44)
2018	Konyaspor	13	(6)
2018–2019	Qatar SC	17	(6)
Total		587	(293)
International career
2000	Cameroon U23	6	(1)
1997–2014	Cameroon	118	(56)
Managerial career
- 2015–2016: Antalyaspor (interim player-manager)
Medal record
Men's Football
Representing Cameroon
Olympic Games
Gold medal – first place	2000 Sydney	Team
Africa Cup of Nations
Winner	2000 Ghana–Nigeria
Winner	2002 Mali
Runner-up	2008 Ghana
FIFA Confederations Cup
Runner-up	2003 France
- * Club domestic league appearances and goals

Samuel Eto'o Fils (French pronunciation: [samɥɛl eto fis]; born 10 March 1981) is a Cameroonian football administrator and former player who is the current president of the Cameroonian Football Federation. Often regarded as one of the greatest strikers of all time, Sports Illustrated ranked him in first place in their list of the best African players in history in 2026.

A precocious talent, Eto'o moved to Real Madrid as a 16 year old. Due to competition in his position with more experienced players, he had several loan spells, before signing for Mallorca in 2000 where he scored 70 goals, a club record. His impressive form saw him join Barcelona in 2004 where he scored 130 goals in five seasons and also became the record holder for the most appearances by an African player in La Liga. Winning La Liga three times, he was a key member of the Barcelona attack, alongside Ronaldinho, that won the 2006 UEFA Champions League Final, with Eto'o scoring in the final, and was part of a front three of Lionel Messi and Thierry Henry that won the 2009 UEFA Champions League Final, with Eto'o again scoring in the final. He is the second player in history to score in two UEFA Champions League finals. At Barcelona, Eto'o came in third for the FIFA World Player of the Year in 2005 and was twice named in the FIFA FIFPro World XI, in 2005 and 2006.

He signed with Inter Milan for the 2009–10 season, where he became the first player to win two European continental trebles following his back-to-back achievements with Barcelona and Inter. He is the fourth player in Champions League history, after Marcel Desailly, Paulo Sousa, and Gerard Piqué, to have won the trophy two years in a row with different teams. After brief spells with Anzhi Makhachkala, Chelsea, Everton, and Sampdoria, Eto'o found prolific form again in the Süper Lig with Antalyaspor having scored 44 goals in 76 league games. In 2015, he received the Golden Foot Award.

He won the African Player of the Year a record four times, winning in 2003, 2004, 2005, and 2010. As a member of the Cameroon national team, Eto'o was a part of the squad that won the Gold Medal at the 2000 Olympics. He also won the Africa Cup of Nations in 2000 and 2002. Eto'o has participated in four World Cups and six Africa Cup of Nations. He is the all-time leading scorer in the history of the Africa Cup of Nations, with 18 goals, and is Cameroon's all-time leading scorer and third most capped player, with 56 goals in 118 caps. Eto'o announced his retirement from international football in August 2014.

== Club career ==
=== Real Madrid ===
Having trained at the Kadji Sports Academy in Cameroon, Eto'o joined Real Madrid's youth academy in 1997, but he could only train with Real Madrid B, as he was still a minor. Real Madrid B were relegated to the third tier, Segunda División B, where non-EU players are not allowed, and as a result, he was loaned to second division Leganés for the 1997–98 season. After making 30 appearances for the club and only scoring four goals, he returned to Madrid following the end of the 1998–99 season. In January 1999, he was loaned out to Espanyol, but made only one appearance for the club, against Real Valladolid in Copa del Rey.

=== Mallorca ===
The next season, in the winter transfer window, he transferred to La Liga team Mallorca on loan, where he scored six goals in 19 games. At the end of the season, Eto'o left Real Madrid, signing a permanent deal with Mallorca for a club record £4.4 million fee. In his second season, he scored 11 goals and began to garner attention throughout the league. Mallorca President Mateo Alemany said of his style of play, "I doubt if there is any other player in the world who would please the fans more at this moment." Eto'o himself commented on his rise to stardom, "I like it here in Mallorca; I have always been well looked after, the fans appreciate me and I also have a contract that runs until 2007." He returned the fans' appreciation when he donated €30,000 in meals to travelling Mallorca supporters who made the journey to the Copa del Rey final against Recreativo de Huelva in 2003. Mallorca won the match 3–0, with Eto'o scoring two late goals to seal the victory. Eto'o also scored in two consecutive away wins against his former club Real Madrid: the first, a 1–5 thrashing, the only home loss of the Madrilenian club who went to win the 2002-03 La Liga.; the second ended with a 2–3 result that denied a back-to-back La Liga win for Real.

=== Barcelona ===
==== 2004–07: Transfer, Pichichi Trophy and first Champions League title ====
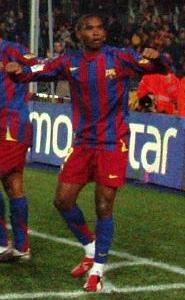
Eto'o celebrating a goal for Barcelona in December 2005

Eto'o departed Mallorca as the club's all-time leading domestic league scorer (54 goals) when he signed for Barcelona in the summer of 2004 for a transfer fee of €24 million, after lengthy, three-way negotiations with Mallorca and Madrid. Initially, Real Madrid President Florentino Pérez wanted to buy back the full transfer rights and loan him out again, but eventually the Barcelona deal proved lucrative enough to warrant a sale. Additionally, the team already had its full quota of three non-EU players.

Eto'o made his Barcelona debut in the season opener at Racing de Santander on 29 August 2004. After Barcelona won the 2004–05 La Liga title, the team organized a festive party in the Camp Nou, during which Eto'o harangued the fans chanting, "Madrid, cabrón, saluda al campeón" (English for, "Madrid, bastards, salute the champions"). The Royal Spanish Football Federation fined Eto'o €12,000 for his comments, for which he later apologized. He expressed regret and asked for forgiveness from Real Madrid, his first professional team. The head of the Real Madrid fan club federation remained unimpressed, however, stating, "This character is a fantastic player, but he leaves a lot to be desired as a person." He signed an improved contract with Barcelona in June 2005.

After missing out on the previous year's Pichichi trophy, which is given to the top scorer in La Liga, Eto'o edged out Valencia striker David Villa for the award during the final matchday on 20 May 2006 when he scored his 26th goal of the season against Athletic Bilbao. Eto'o was very gracious to teammates after the game, saying, "It has been a team effort although only one person gets the award. We've worked hard all season and have got our just rewards."

Eto'o also contributed six goals during Barcelona's run to the 2005–06 Champions League title. In the final, Arsenal goalkeeper Jens Lehmann was sent off early on for bringing down Eto'o just outside the penalty area, but the Catalans struggled to capitalize on their one-man advantage until Eto'o scored the game-tying goal in the second half. Barcelona went on to win the match 2–1, and Eto'o was awarded with the UEFA Best Forward of the Year award for his accomplishments in the European campaign.

Eto'o also won an historic third consecutive African Player of the Year award that season. He said in his acceptance speech, "Above all, I dedicate this to all the children of Africa." He was also selected to his second straight FIFPro World XI and finished third in the running for the FIFA World Player of the Year, making him only the second African footballer ever, after the Liberian star George Weah, to be voted into the top three.

The season started badly for Eto'o, as he ruptured the meniscus in his right knee during Barcelona's Champions League group stage match against Werder Bremen on 27 September 2006. Barcelona team physician Ricard Pruna originally estimated that the injury would keep him out of action for two to three months. After the operation, Eto'o's recovery time was extended to five months, but he resumed training with Barcelona in early January 2007.

==== 2007–09: More trophies, the Treble and departure ====
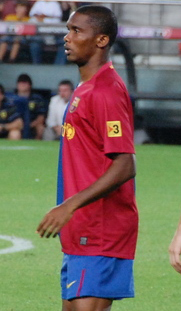
Eto'o during the 2008 Joan Gamper Trophy

Eto'o refused to come on as a substitute in a league match against Racing de Santander on 11 February 2007. Barcelona manager Frank Rijkaard said after the match, "He did not want to come on; I don't know why." Ronaldinho was critical of Eto'o's actions, saying that Eto'o was not putting the team first, but Eto'o rebutted the comment, claiming that he did not come on because he did not have enough time to warm up properly. Three months later, Eto'o said, "These kind of things are usually just speculation and don't come through to me. However, if it is true that I am a problem for my team then I will go. But like I said, I am happy here. The press can write what they want." Following the comments, Barcelona President Joan Laporta was quick to quash rumours of transfers involving Eto'o and Ronaldinho.

After aggravating a meniscus injury on 28 August during a summer friendly against Inter Milan, Eto'o was sidelined indefinitely. On 17 October, in the midst of his recovery period, he gained Spanish citizenship. He was cleared to play again on 4 December, and returned to the side a week later in Barcelona's 2–1 league win over Deportivo de La Coruña.

Pep Guardiola was appointed as Barcelona's new manager for the 2008–09 season. The coach made headlines by announcing that stars such as Ronaldinho, Deco, and Eto'o were not part of his plans; Eto'o ultimately remained with the club, while the other two players departed, although Eto'o and Guardiola had several reported disagreements throughout the season. Eto'o recorded his first league hat-trick in a match against Levante on 24 February 2008. He finished with a total of 16 league goals in 18 appearances for the season.

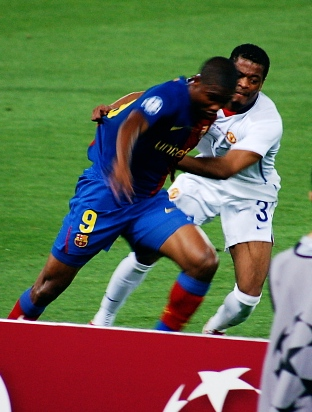
Eto'o holding off Patrice Evra of Manchester United in the 2009 UEFA Champions League Final

On 25 October, Eto'o recorded the fastest hat-trick in club history after netting three times in 23 minutes in a victory over Almería. Only two games later, on 8 November 2008, Eto'o scored four goals in the first half of Barcelona's game against Real Valladolid, which ended 6–0. On 29 November 2008, he scored his 111th career Barcelona goal in all competitions in a 3–0 road win over Sevilla, moving him into the club's top ten all-time goalscorers.

On 14 February 2009, he scored his 99th and his 100th league goals for Barcelona in a 2–2 draw with Real Betis. Eto'o scored his 30th goal of the 2008–09 season in a La Liga match against Real Valladolid. The game ended 1–0 and meant that Barcelona kept a six-point lead over Real Madrid in the league. He also scored against Villarreal in the game that put Barcelona one point away from lifting the 2008–09 La Liga trophy. He scored 30 goals in the season, finishing second in the Pichichi Trophy goalscorers list behind Atlético de Madrid's Diego Forlán.

Eto'o scored the opening goal in the 2009 UEFA Champions League Final against Manchester United. Barcelona went on to win the final 2–0, thus completing the Treble. The trio of Lionel Messi (38 goals), Eto'o (36 goals) and Thierry Henry (26 goals) scored exactly 100 goals between them in the club's historic treble year.

=== Inter Milan ===
==== 2009–10: Historical treble-winning campaign ====
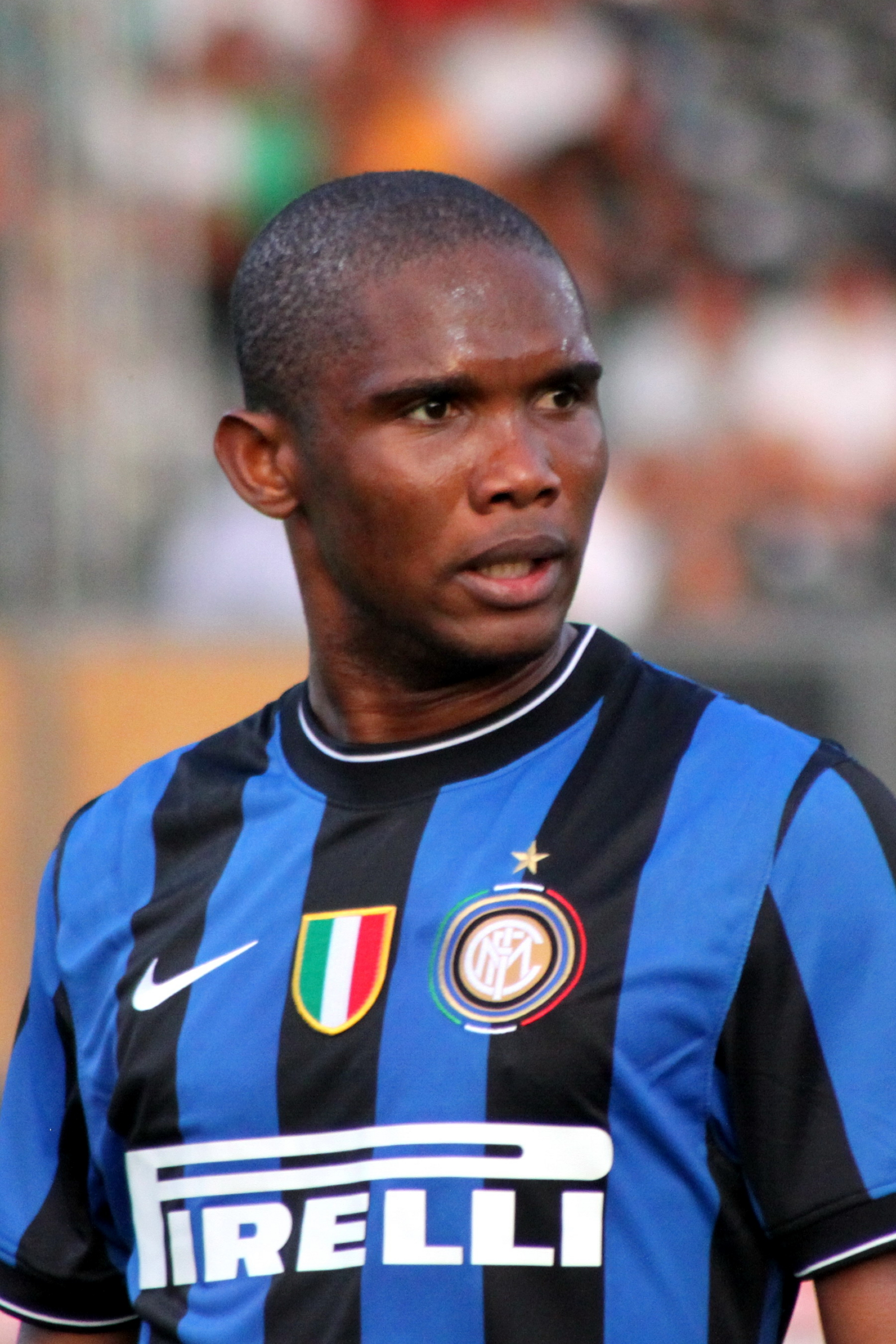
Eto’o playing for Inter Milan in August 2009

After Maxwell completed the transfer from Inter Milan, Joan Laporta confirmed that there was an agreement in principle between Barcelona and Inter Milan for Zlatan Ibrahimović to join the club in exchange for Eto'o and €46 million. After Ibrahimović agreed terms with Barcelona, the club announced Eto'o would travel to Milan for his medical to complete the transfer.

On 27 July 2009, Eto'o passed his medical and signed for five years with Inter. On his first press-conference in Milan, he declared that he was where he wanted to be and refused to compare himself to Ibrahimović saying, "I'm Samuel Eto'o and I don't want to compare myself to anyone. I believe the victories I have earned up to now can contribute to giving the right value to my name." On 8 August, Eto'o scored on his competitive debut in the 2009 Supercoppa Italiana as Inter lost 1–2 to Lazio. Two weeks later, Eto'o scored from the penalty spot against Bari in his first Serie A match. In the following match, the Derby della Madonnina against Milan, Eto'o won Inter a penalty after being brought down by Gennaro Gattuso in the box; Milito scored the penalty and Gattuso was yellow carded and eventually sent off. Inter won the match 4–0. Eto'o scored again on 13 September against Parma, his first goal from open play in a Serie A match.

At the end of September 2009, Eto'o demanded almost £2.75 million from Barcelona after his transfer to Inter. The amount represented 15% of the £17.7 million (US$29 million) fee which Inter paid Barcelona in July 2009. The demand was based on a Spanish rule that a player should get 15% of the amount of his transfer to another Spanish club. If the parties failed to reach a solution, the matter could go to court.

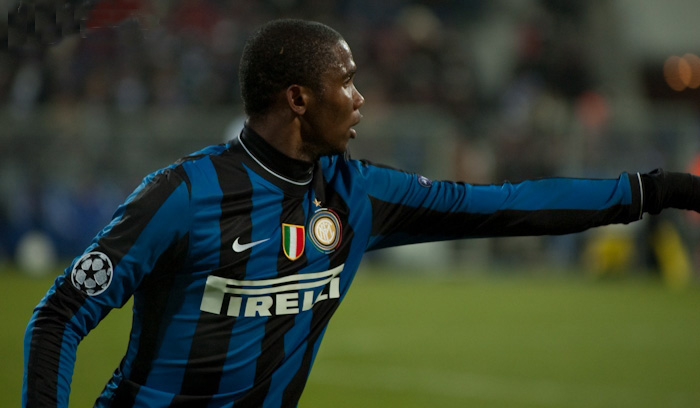
Eto'o playing in the UEFA Champions League with Inter Milan, a competition he would win for the third time in his career

Eto'o scored his first Serie A brace on 29 October during a 5–3 win over Palermo, with Mario Balotelli also scoring twice. On 1 December 2009, Eto'o finished fifth in voting for the Ballon d'Or, which was won by his former Barcelona teammate Lionel Messi. Eight days later, he scored his first UEFA Champions League goal for the team in the final Group F match against Rubin Kazan to help Inter win 2–0 at home and progress to the knockout stage as runner-ups. Eto'o continued to be a protagonist for Inter in Europe, netting the winner in the second leg of 2009–10 UEFA Champions League round of 16 against Chelsea on 16 March 2010, which allowed Inter to progress to the quarter-finals. He scored his first goal in Coppa Italia on 13 April against Fiorentina in the second of semi-finals to help Inter win 1–0 at Stadio Artemio Franchi and progress in the final 2–0 on aggregate. Eto'o won his first silverware with the club on 5 May as Inter defeated Roma 1–0 at Stadio Olimpico to lift the Coppa Italia. His 12 Serie A goals helped Inter claim another championship, the fifth consecutive, after defeating Siena in the final matchday. On 22 May 2010, Eto'o played in the third Champions League final of his career, as Inter won 2–0 over Bayern Munich to win the first title in 45 years; Milito scored both goals, with Eto'o setting up the second. With Inter's triumph over Bayern Munich, he became the only player to win the treble in consecutive seasons with two different teams.

==== 2010–11: Most goals in one season, more trophies and departure ====
On 21 August 2010, Eto'o scored twice as Inter beat Roma 3–1 to win the Supercoppa Italiana. His first hat trick for Inter occurred in the UEFA Champions League against Werder Bremen on 29 September 2010. Inter won the game 4–0, with Eto'o saying, "We will remain humble because we know that there are sides out there that are better than us, so we will just take it one match at a time and we will go as far as it takes us." In December, Eto'o played in the 2010 FIFA Club World Cup; he scored against TP Mazembe in the final as Inter won 3–0 and lifted their fifth trophy of the year. Additionally, he was named the best player of the tournament.

Continuing his outstanding form in Serie A and in the Champions League for the 2010–11 campaign, he was pivotal to Inter's attack line. On 16 March 2011, Eto'o gave a legendary performance in Munich as he helped Inter eliminate Bayern Munich 3–2 (with an aggregate score of 3–3, winning on away goals) in the Champions League. Eto'o scored the first goal after four minutes, and provided two clinical assists to Wesley Sneijder and to Goran Pandev for the winner. After the game, Inter President Massimo Moratti said, "I'm not sure if the deal that brought Eto'o to the club was my best piece of transfer business ever, but I really think it was a great piece of business for us. Eto'o is fantastic. I do not want to take anything away from Ibrahimović, but for everyone it was really a great deal to get Eto'o. Samuel is truly extraordinary." On 29 May, Eto'o scored two goals in the final of the Coppa Italia against Palermo to help Inter win 3–1 and taking his total season goals to 37, a new record high for him.

On 25 August 2011, Eto'o announced his departure from Inter Milan via an open letter to the fans.

=== Anzhi Makhachkala ===
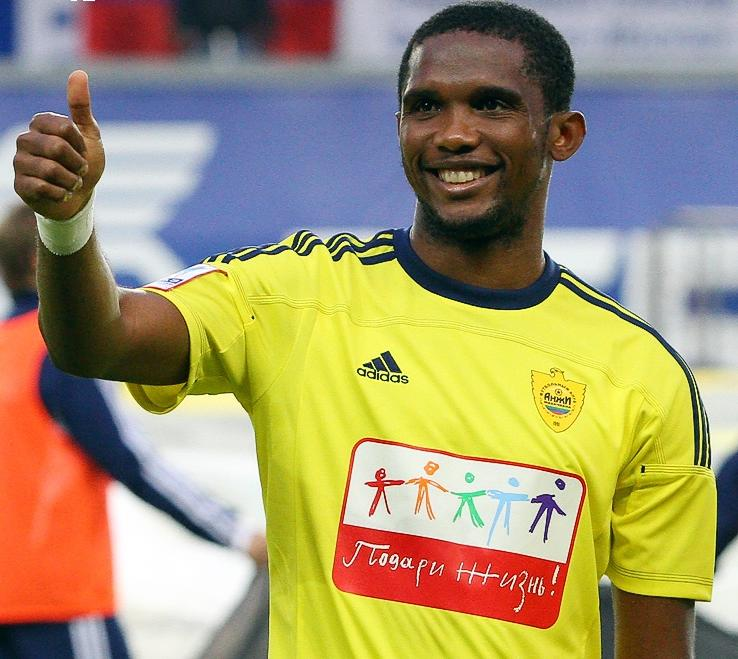
Eto'o with Anzhi Makhachkala in a Russian Cup game against Dynamo Moscow in September 2011

On 23 August 2011, Russian club Anzhi Makhachkala reached an agreement with Inter to sign Eto'o in a three-year deal that made him the world's highest-paid player, with a salary of €20 million (after taxes) per season. Eto'o made his debut for Anzhi on 27 August 2011 against Rostov when he came on as a substitute with 30 minutes left in the game, later scoring an equalizer in the 80th minute from a cross by Yuri Zhirkov. Eto'o scored the opening goal in a 5–3 defeat at home to CSKA Moscow leaving his side four points above Krasnodar with only two games left for qualification to the Championship Group.

At the end of the 2012–13 Russian Premier League, Eto'o made it to the Top 33 players of the Season list as the #1 Right Striker. Anzhi's billionaire owner Suleyman Kerimov shocked the Russian football world by deciding in August 2013 to scale down the club's ambitions and drastically shrink its budget. As a result, almost all of the star players, previously signed in a bid to make the club world-beaters, were available on the transfer market.

=== Chelsea ===
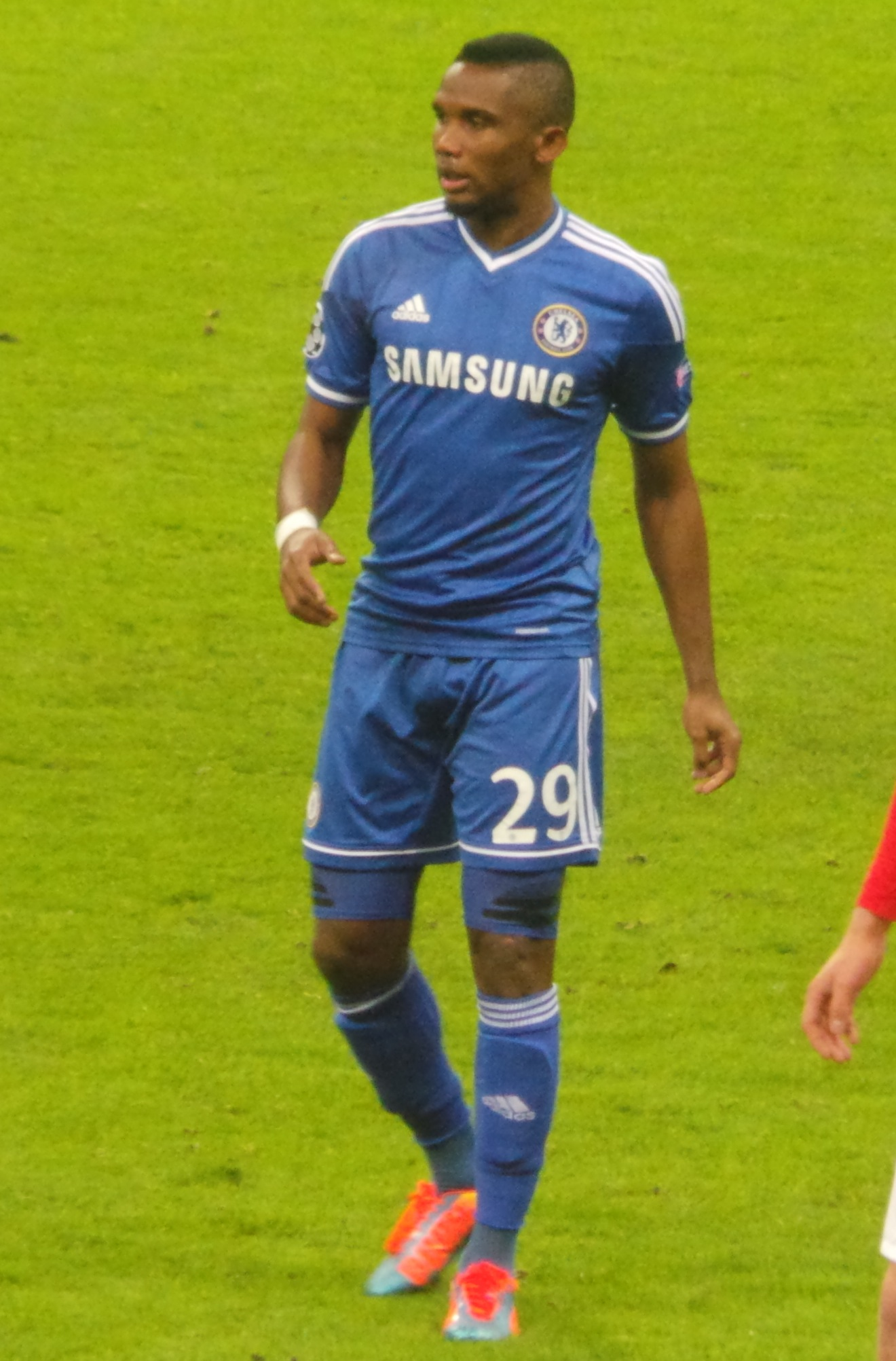
Eto'o playing for Chelsea in 2014

On 29 August 2013, Eto'o signed a one-year deal with English Premier League club Chelsea for an undisclosed fee. He scored his first goal for Chelsea on 19 October 2013 against Cardiff City, in which he gave Chelsea the lead. In Chelsea's home Champions League match against Schalke 04 on 6 November, Eto'o scored twice in a 3–0 victory. In Eto'o's first league start of 2014, on 19 January, he scored his first Premier League hat-trick for Chelsea, earning the Blues a 3–1 victory over Manchester United at Stamford Bridge. On 8 March, Eto'o opened scoring in Chelsea's 4–0 victory over Tottenham Hotspur when defender Jan Vertonghen sent a backpass straight into his path. It was the 300th goal in his club career.

In the second leg of Chelsea's Champions League round of 16 tie with Galatasaray, Eto'o gave the Blues a fourth-minute early lead with his tenth goal of the season, a match they would go on to win 2–0. Eto'o continued his good form after scoring another early goal, in the fifth minute, against Arsenal on 22 March. However, he was then substituted after ten minutes for Fernando Torres after picking up a slight injury; Chelsea went on to win the match 6–0.

=== Everton ===
Eto'o's contract with Chelsea expired at the end of the 2013–14 season, and on 26 August 2014, he joined fellow English Premier League side Everton, signing a two-year contract. He made his debut four days later, scoring one goal with a header in a 3–6 home defeat to Chelsea. On 26 October, Eto'o bagged a brace for Everton, heading in the opening goal and curling in a strike from outside the area, as the Toffees defeated Burnley 3−1.

He stated that he wanted to win the UEFA Europa League with Everton, a tournament which he had never won before. However, Eto'o left halfway through his first season at Everton, having scored four goals in 20 games across all competitions for them.

=== Later career and retirement ===
On 27 January 2015, Eto'o returned to the Italian Serie A, joining Sampdoria on a two-and-a-half-year deal.

On 25 June 2015, Eto'o moved to Turkish side Antalyaspor on a three-year contract. He made his debut on 15 August 2015 in a league match against İstanbul Başakşehir, scoring two goals and helping Antalyaspor win 3–2. Eto'o had a blistering start to the season, scoring 13 goals in his first 15 games, and was named the interim player-manager for the team after the previous coach, Yusuf Şimşek, was sacked on 7 December. He continued in this capacity until José Morais was hired as Şimşek's permanent replacement on 6 January 2016.

On 31 January 2018, after leaving Antalyaspor by mutual consent, Eto'o joined league rivals Konyaspor on a two-and-a-half-year contract.

He signed for Qatar SC in August 2018. In February 2019 he said he wished to continue playing for a further year.

On 7 September 2019, Eto'o announced his retirement from football.

== International career ==
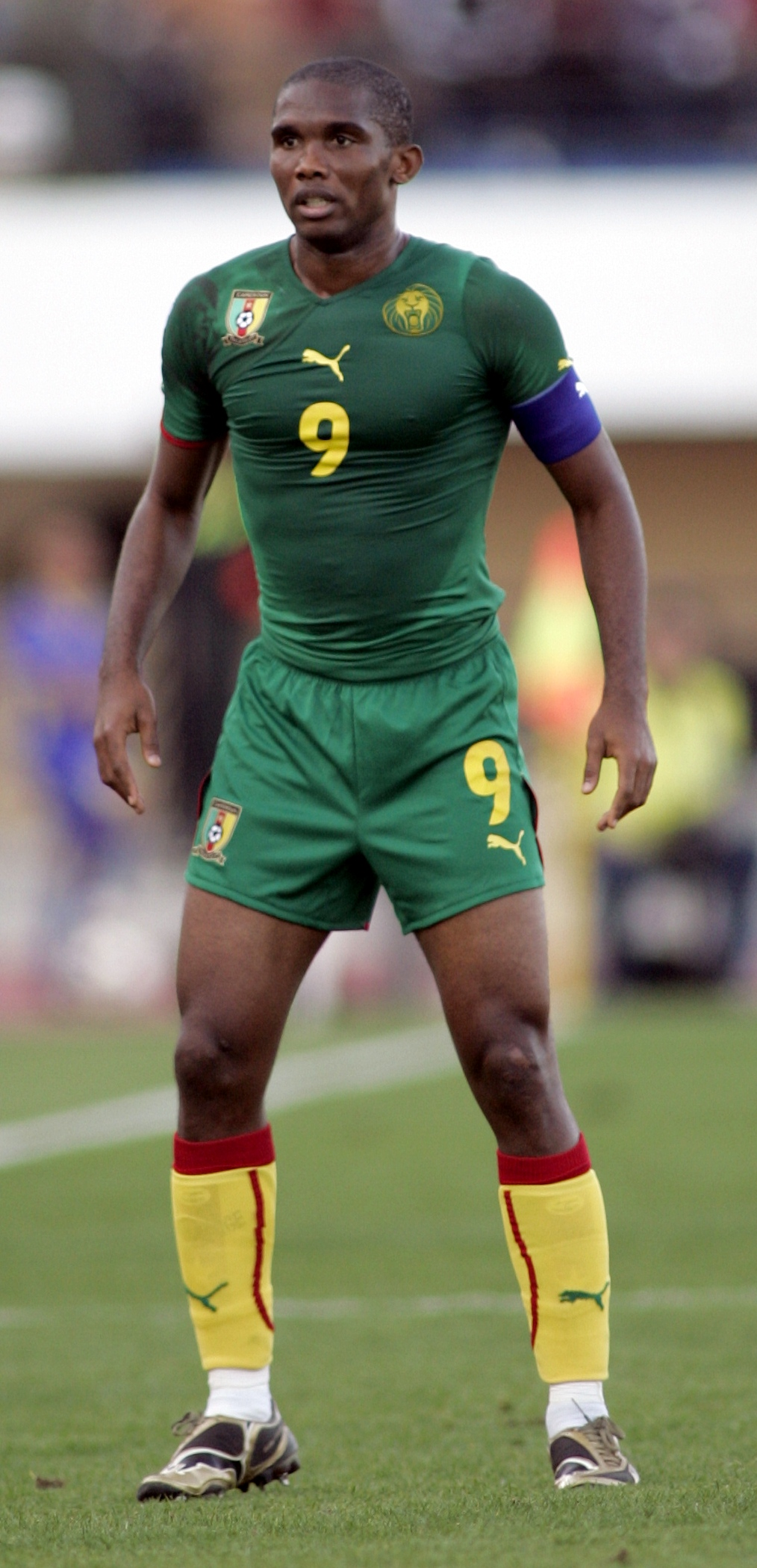
Eto'o playing for Cameroon in 2009. He is their all-time leading scorer with 56 goals.

Eto'o earned his first cap with Cameroon one day before his 16th birthday on 9 March 1997, in a 5–0 friendly loss to Costa Rica. In 1998, he was the youngest participant in the 1998 FIFA World Cup when he appeared in a 3–0 group stage loss to Italy on 17 June 1998, at the age of 17 years and three months. Eto'o scored his sole goal of the 2002 FIFA World Cup when he netted the game-winner against Saudi Arabia during the group stage on 6 June 2002, which was Cameroon's only win of the competition.

Eto'o was a part of the squads that won the 2000 and 2002 Africa Cup of Nations, and was a gold medalist at the 2000 Summer Olympics. At the 2003 FIFA Confederations Cup, in which Cameroon finished as runners-up, he scored his only goal in a 1–0 group stage upset of Brazil on 19 June. Cameroon were eliminated in the quarter-finals of the 2006 Africa Cup of Nations after Eto'o missed the decisive penalty in a 12–11 penalty shootout loss to Ivory Coast following a 1–1 draw, but he nonetheless finished as the top scorer of the tournament with five goals. He missed a team practice before the quarter-finals to attend the CAF African Footballer of the Year award ceremonies in Togo.

In the 2008 Africa Cup of Nations, Eto'o became joint leading goalscorer (along with Laurent Pokou) in the competition's history after scoring his 14th goal with a penalty against Zambia on 26 January 2008. In the following game against Sudan, on 30 January, Eto'o converted another penalty to become the tournament's all-time leading scorer, followed by another goal in the same match that took his Cup of Nations tally to 16. He finished as the top scorer for the second consecutive tournament, matching his 2006 total of five goals.

On 1 June 2008, Eto'o headbutted reporter Philippe Bony following an incident at a press conference. Bony suffered an injury, but Eto'o later apologized for the altercation, offering to pay Bony's medical expenses. In the 2010 FIFA World Cup qualifying match against Gabon, Eto'o scored a goal in the 68th minute. He followed it up with another goal in the home fixture. He led the scoring chart with eight qualification goals. Eto'o scored in the World Cup qualification match against Morocco to win Cameroon a spot in the 2010 FIFA World Cup tournament. On 19 June 2010, Eto'o scored a goal in Cameroon's 2010 World Cup group stage match against Denmark, from a mistake by Christian Poulsen. Cameroon eventually lost the game 2–1 and was eliminated from the World Cup. Eto'o described it as the biggest disappointment of his career. In December 2010, Eto'o became the first man to be named African Player of the Year for a fourth time.

On 16 December 2011, Eto'o was suspended 15 games by the Cameroonian Football Federation, after the team refused to play a friendly against Algeria earlier in the year. The ban was reduced to eight months in January 2012, meaning Eto'o would only miss four competitive matches. The change was brought about after Cameroon President Paul Biya asked officials to reconsider the controversial sanction.

On 27 August 2012, Eto'o was in the squad to face Cape Verde in the first leg of a qualification play-off for the 2013 Africa Cup of Nations, but the striker refused to play, as a protest against what he described as the "amateurish and poorly organised" national team set-up. After an intervention from Cameroon Prime Minister Philemon Yang, Eto'o agreed to return for the second leg. However, Eto'o's return was not enough for Cameroon to overturn a 0–2 first leg deficit, and the Indomitable Lions failed to qualify for the Cup of Nations.

On 23 March 2013, Eto'o scored his first goal for Cameroon in 16 months with a penalty kick against Togo in a 2014 World Cup qualifier. He went on to score an 82nd minute winning goal in the same match, sending Cameroon to the top of their qualifying group. In November 2013, he captained the team in their 4–1 aggregate defeat of Tunisia in the play-off to secure World Cup qualification. In June 2014, Eto'o was selected in Cameroon's squad for the 2014 FIFA World Cup, becoming the third African to participate in four tournaments after compatriots Jacques Songo'o and Rigobert Song. After joining Everton, on 27 August 2014, Eto'o announced his retirement from international competition.

== Player profile ==
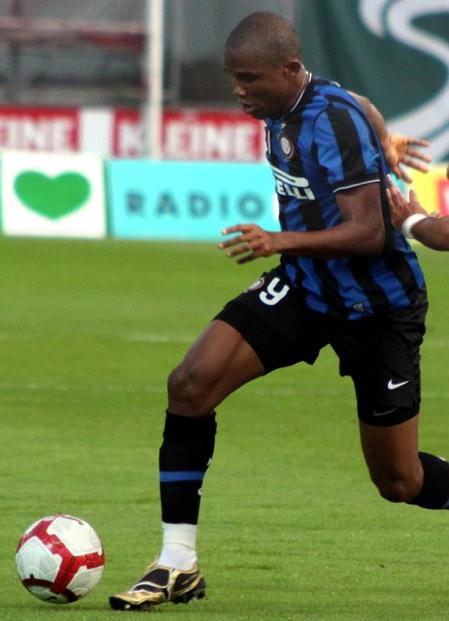
In his prime Eto'o was extremely quick and possessed excellent dribbling ability with close ball control

Eto'o was a fast, strong, and energetic forward, who was known for his stamina, work-rate, ability in the air, and his accurate finishing ability both with his head and feet. A powerful and prolific goalscorer with good technique, composure in front of goal, and an ability to play off other forwards, Eto'o was primarily deployed as a central striker, although he was also a team player; indeed, during his time at Inter, under José Mourinho, he demonstrated notable tactical intelligence and versatility by playing in several other positions on the pitch. During Inter's 2009–10 treble-winning season, Eto'o played an important role in the squad, and was utilised as a winger or even as an attacking midfielder on the left flank in Mourinho's 4–2–3–1 formation, where he was primarily required to help his team creatively and defensively with his link-up play and work-rate off the ball, which frequently saw him to track back. During the return leg of the Champions League semi-final match against his former club Barcelona, Eto'o further demonstrated his work-rate and versatility by playing as a makeshift right-sided attacking full-back or wing-back following Thiago Motta's controversial sending-off. Eto'o has also been renowned for his leadership, opportunism and mentality throughout his career.

In his prime, Eto'o was regarded by pundits as one of the best strikers in the world; he is currently regarded as one of the greatest African players of all time. He is often ranked among the three greatest African strikers, alongside George Weah and Didier Drogba. Despite losing some of his speed with age, he continued to maintain a consistent goalscoring rate as a striker, due to his ability to get into good positions and time his attacking runs, as shown by his goal in a 6–3 loss against Chelsea on 30 August 2014, during his time with Everton. Beyond his speed and goalscoring, Eto'o was also known for his first touch, close control, and passing ability in his prime; even in his advancing age, he maintained his dribbling skills in his later career, which he used to his advantage to beat defenders and assist or create chances for teammates. In his mid-thirties Eto'o incorporated an ‘old man’ routine in his goal celebration – a response to jibes by José Mourinho about being too old – where he bent over and started walking slowly with an imaginary cane, with the celebration featuring in EA Sports’ FIFA video game FIFA 18.

== President of Cameroon Football Federation (FECAFOOT) ==
On 11 December 2021, Eto'o was elected President of the Cameroonian Football Federation (FECAFOOT). In September 2024 he received a six-month ban from attending Cameroon international games due to breaching the world governing body's disciplinary code. This came after charges were filed against him following an incident at a 2024 FIFA U-20 Women's World Cup match in Colombia between Brazil and Cameroon.

Eto'o delivered an emotional locker room speech on January 9, 2026, following Cameroon's 2-0 quarterfinal loss to Morocco at the Africa Cup of Nations.

Eto'o set a bold target to win the CAN 2027, hosted by Tanzania, Kenya, and Uganda, declaring "we come to win it" and vowing revenge after missing the 2026 World Cup due to internal conflicts between Fécafoot and the sports ministry.

== World Cup 2022 ambassador ==
Eto'o was appointed Ambassador of the 2022 FIFA World Cup in Qatar.

After the Brazil-South Korea match, he was filmed kneeing a man in the face after a confrontation. News reporters were unable to identify the man or reason behind the attack, which did not appear to cause any serious injury.

== Personal life ==
Eto'o is a native of Nkon, a suburb of Yaoundé. He has two brothers who are also footballers: David and Étienne. Eto'o has four children: Maelle, Étienne, Siena and Lynn. He married his longtime sweetheart Georgette on 6 July 2007. Georgette is the mother of Siena and Lynn, who both live with her in Paris. On 17 October 2007, he earned his Spanish passport.

On 9 November 2020, Eto'o was involved in a car accident, when his 4×4 had a head-on collision with a bus. It was said that Eto'o was unhurt from the accident. The driver of the bus tried to escape the scene before being apprehended and taken to a police station.

Eto'o was crowned paramount chief in Kaffu Bullom, a chiefdom in Sierra Leone in November 2015. He was visiting Sierra Leone as part of the FIFA "11 for Health and 11 against Ebola" programme in the country.

He is also a supporter of French club Paris Saint-Germain.

=== Racism ===
Eto'o experienced racial abuse in some away matches during his career. He is one of several high-profile contemporary players to have reacted to the abuse by threatening to leave the pitch and being outspoken in criticism of their experiences.

In February 2005, during an away match with Real Zaragoza, Eto'o was the subject of racist taunts by Zaragoza supporters, who began making monkey-like chants whenever he had possession of the ball. Referee Fernando Carmona Méndez, however, made no mention of the incidents in his match report, commenting only that the behavior of the crowd was "normal"; two of the abusers were caught and given five-month sporting-event bans after being identified to police by other spectators. Eto'o later declared that the punishment was insufficient and that La Romareda should have been closed for at least one year, but his manager Frank Rijkaard, of Surinamese origin, told him to concentrate on football and stop talking about the incident. Infuriated again by Zaragoza fans' racist chants the following season, however, Eto'o attempted to walk off the pitch in protest. His teammates intervened and convinced him to continue playing.

After experiencing regular racist abuse from sections of support in Spanish crowds, Eto'o stopped bringing family members to matches. He stated, "It is something that has affected me personally. I think players, leaders, and the media have to join forces so that no one feels looked down upon because of the colour of their skin. At this moment in time I prefer my children don't go to football matches. In the stands they have to listen to things that are difficult to explain to a child. It is better they aren't exposed to it."

On 17 October 2010, in a Serie A game against Cagliari, after just three minutes of play, the referee halted the match to give a warning to some Cagliari fans who were singing racist chants towards Eto'o. After play was resumed, the rest of the stadium chanted loudly in an attempt to drown out the racist chants in order to avoid the match being suspended. Inter went on to win 1–0 with an Eto'o goal in the 39th minute.

== Career statistics ==
=== Club ===
Appearances and goals by club, season and competition
Club	Season	League			National cup (Note: Includes Copa del Rey, Coppa Italia, Russian Cup, FA Cup, Turkish Cup)		League cup (Note: Includes Football League Cup)		Continental		Other		Total	
Club	Season	Division	Apps	Goals	Apps	Goals	Apps	Goals	Apps	Goals	Apps	Goals	Apps	Goals
Leganés (loan)	1997–98	Segunda División	28	3	2	1	—		—		—		30	4
Real Madrid	1998–99	La Liga	1	0	0	0	—		0	0	—		1	0
Real Madrid	1999–2000	La Liga	2	0	0	0	—		3 (Note: Appearances in UEFA Champions League)	0	1 (Note: Appearance in FIFA Club World Championship)	0	6	0
Real Madrid	Total		3	0	0	0	—		3	0	1	0	7	0
Espanyol (loan)	1998–99	La Liga	0	0	1	0	—		—		—		1	0
Mallorca	1999–2000 (loan)	La Liga	13	6	0	0	—		—		—		13	6
Mallorca	2000–01	La Liga	28	11	5	2	—		—		—		33	13
Mallorca	2001–02	La Liga	30	6	1	1	—		9 (Note: Seven appearances and two goals in UEFA Champions League, two appearances and one goal in UEFA Cup)	3	—		40	10
Mallorca	2002–03	La Liga	30	14	6	5	—		—		—		36	19
Mallorca	2003–04	La Liga	32	17	2	0	—		7 (Note: Appearances in UEFA Cup)	4	2 (Note: Appearances in Supercopa de España)	1	43	22
Mallorca	Total		133	54	14	8	—		16	7	2	1	165	70
Barcelona	2004–05	La Liga	37	25	1	0	—		7	4	—		45	29
Barcelona	2005–06	La Liga	34	26	0	0	—		11	6	2	2	47	34
Barcelona	2006–07	La Liga	19	11	2	1	—		3	1	3 (Note: Two appearances in Supercopa de España, one appearance in UEFA Super Cup)	0	27	13
Barcelona	2007–08	La Liga	18	16	3	1	—		7	1	—		28	18
Barcelona	2008–09	La Liga	36	30	4	0	—		12	6	—		52	36
Barcelona	Total		144	108	10	2	—		40	18	5	2	199	130
Inter Milan	2009–10	Serie A	32	12	2	1	—		13	2	1 (Note: Appearance in Supercoppa Italiana)	1	48	16
Inter Milan	2010–11	Serie A	35	21	4	5	—		10	8	4 (Note: One appearance and two goals in Supercoppa Italiana, one appearance in UEFA Super Cup, two appearances and one goal in FIFA Club World Cup)	3	53	37
Inter Milan	2011–12	Serie A	0	0	0	0	—		0	0	1	0	1	0
Inter Milan	Total		67	33	6	6	—		23	10	6	4	102	53
Anzhi Makhachkala	2011–12	Russian Premier League	22	13	1	0	—		0	0	—		23	13
Anzhi Makhachkala	2012–13	Russian Premier League	25	10	3	2	—		16 (Note: Appearances in UEFA Europa League)	9	—		44	21
Anzhi Makhachkala	2013–14	Russian Premier League	6	2	0	0	—		0	0	—		6	2
Anzhi Makhachkala	Total		53	25	4	2	—		16	9	—		73	36
Chelsea	2013–14	Premier League	21	9	3	0	2	0	9	3	—		35	12
Everton	2014–15	Premier League	14	3	1	0	1	0	4	1	—		20	4
Sampdoria	2014–15	Serie A	18	2	—		—		—		—		18	2
Antalyaspor	2015–16	Süper Lig	31	20	1	0	—		—		—		32	20
Antalyaspor	2016–17	Süper Lig	30	18	0	0	—		—		—		30	18
Antalyaspor	2017–18	Süper Lig	15	6	0	0	—		—		—		15	6
Antalyaspor	Total		76	44	1	0	—		—		—		77	44
Konyaspor	2017–18	Süper Lig	13	6	1	0	—		—		—		18	6
Qatar SC	2018–19	Qatar Stars League	17	6	3	3	0	0	—		3 (Note: Appearances in Qatar Stars League relegation play-off and Emir of Qatar Cup)	1	23	10
Career total			587	293	46	22	3	0	111	48	17	8	764	371

=== International ===
Appearances and goals by national team and year
National team	Year	Apps	Goals
Cameroon	1997	3	0
Cameroon	1998	5	0
Cameroon	1999	1	0
Cameroon	2000	9	5
Cameroon	2001	9	2
Cameroon	2002	13	5
Cameroon	2003	7	2
Cameroon	2004	9	4
Cameroon	2005	6	1
Cameroon	2006	5	5
Cameroon	2007	3	1
Cameroon	2008	11	11
Cameroon	2009	8	5
Cameroon	2010	12	8
Cameroon	2011	9	4
Cameroon	2012	2	0
Cameroon	2013	4	2
Cameroon	2014	3	1
Total		118	56

International goals

See List of international goals scored by Samuel Eto'o

=== Manager ===
Team	From	To	Record					
Team	From	To	M	W	D	L	Win %	Ref.
Antalyaspor	7 December 2015	6 January 2016	5	2	1	2	40.00	
Total			5	2	1	2	40.00	—

== Honours ==
Real Madrid

- UEFA Champions League: 1999–2000

Mallorca

- Copa del Rey: 2002–03

Barcelona

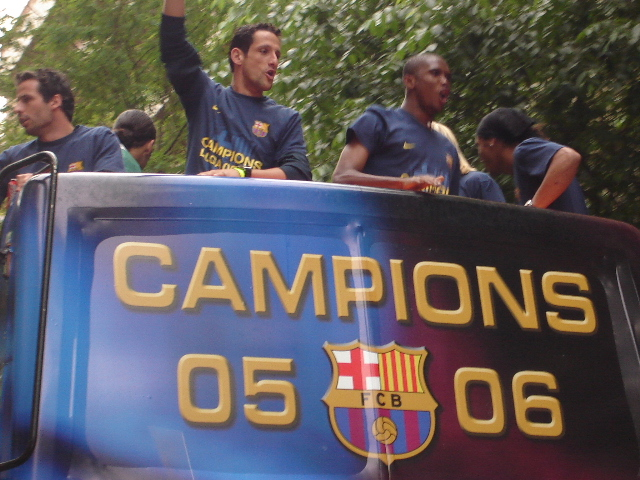
Eto'o and Juliano Belletti celebrate winning the 2005–06 La Liga with Barcelona

- La Liga: 2004–05, 2005–06, 2008–09
- Copa del Rey: 2008–09
- Supercopa de España: 2005, 2006
- UEFA Champions League: 2005–06, 2008–09

Inter Milan

- Serie A: 2009–10
- Coppa Italia: 2009–10, 2010–11
- Supercoppa Italiana: 2010
- UEFA Champions League: 2009–10
- FIFA Club World Cup: 2010

Cameroon U23

- Olympic Gold Medal: 2000

Cameroon

- African Cup of Nations: 2000, 2002; runner-up: 2008
- FIFA Confederations Cup runner-up: 2003

Individual

- Young African Player of the Year: 2000
- African Player of the Year: 2003, 2004, 2005, 2010
- ESM Team of the Year: 2004–05, 2005–06, 2008–09, 2010–11
- FIFA World Player of the Year Bronze Award: 2005
- FIFA FIFPro World XI: 2005, 2006
- UEFA Team of the Year: 2005, 2006
- CAF Team of the Year: 2005, 2006, 2008, 2009, 2010, 2011
- Pichichi Trophy: 2005–06
- UEFA Champions League top assist provider: 2005–06
- UEFA Champions League Squad of the Season: 2005–06,2008–09,2009–10, 2010–11
- African Cup of Nations top goalscorer: 2006, 2008
- UEFA Club Forward of the Year: 2006
- FIFA Club World Cup Golden Ball: 2010
- Coppa Italia top goalscorer: 2010–11
- Russian Premier League MVP Award: 2012–13
- Golden Foot: 2015
- Globe Soccer Player Career Award: 2016
- IFFHS All-time Africa Men's Dream Team: 2021
- Inter Milan Hall of Fame: 2021
- Sports Illustrated The Best African Football Players in History (#1): 2026

Records

- African Cup of Nations all-time top goalscorer
- RCD Mallorca all-time top goalscorer
- Cameroon all-time top goalscorer

== See also ==
- List of top international men's football goalscorers by country
- List of men's footballers with 100 or more international caps
- List of men's footballers with 50 or more international goals
- List of international goals scored by Samuel Eto'o
