= Nereo Champagne =

Argentine footballer

Personal information
- Full name: Nereo Champagne
- Date of birth: 20 January 1985 (age 41)
- Place of birth: Salto, Argentina
- Height: 1.88 m (6 ft 2 in)
- Position: Goalkeeper

Team information
- Current team: Sarmiento
- Number: 99

Youth career
- Sports Salto
- 2001–2007: San Lorenzo

Senior career*
Years	Team	Apps	(Gls)
2007–2012	San Lorenzo	17	(0)
2010–2011	→ Ferro Carril Oeste (loan)	37	(0)
2012–2018	Olimpo	158	(0)
2017–2018	→ Leganés (loan)	6	(0)
2018–2020	Oviedo	47	(0)
2021	Real Murcia	15	(0)
2021–2022	Rayo Majadahonda	35	(0)
2023	Olimpo	20	(0)
2024	Almagro	16	(0)
2024–	Sarmiento	0	(0)
- * Club domestic league appearances and goals as of 15:53, 16 September 2024 (UTC)

Nereo Champagne (born 20 January 1985) is an Argentine footballer who plays for Sarmiento as a goalkeeper.

== Club career ==
Born in Salto, Buenos Aires, Champagne joined San Lorenzo's youth setup in 2001 from hometown side Club Sport Salto. On 9 December 2007, he made his first team – and Primera División – debut, starting in a 4–1 home routing of Gimnasia Jujuy. A backup to Agustín Orion, he only contributed with three appearances during the campaign.

After mainly featuring with the reserves in the following years, Champagne was loaned to Primera B Nacional club Ferro Carril Oeste on 1 July 2010. An undisputed starter for the side, he only missed only one league match during the season.

Returning to Ciclón in 2011, Champagne was initially a backup to Pablo Migliore, but started to feature more regularly after the latter's injury. On 11 July 2012 he moved to Club Olimpo, with Matías Ibáñez moving in the opposite direction on loan.

Champagne immediately became a first-choice for the club, achieving a top tier promotion in his first season. He featured in 158 matches during his five-year spell.

On 3 January 2017, Champagne was loaned to La Liga side CD Leganés until the end of the season. He made his debut in the category five days later, starting in a 0–2 away loss against Real Betis.

On 5 July 2018, Champagne signed a two-year deal with Real Oviedo in Segunda División.

== International career ==
Champagne was a part of the Argentina under-20 squad for the 2005 FIFA World Youth Championship, but acted as an understudy to Óscar Ustari.

== Honours ==
=== International ===
Argentina U20

- FIFA U-20 World Cup: 2005
