= Sergio Arribas (footballer, born 1995) =

Spanish footballer

Personal information
- Full name: Sergio Arribas Blázquez
- Date of birth: 7 July 1995 (age 31)
- Place of birth: Leganés, Spain
- Height: 1.79 m (5 ft 10 in)
- Position: Attacking midfielder

Team information
- Current team: Marchamalo

Youth career
- Real Madrid
- Leganés

Senior career*
Years	Team	Apps	(Gls)
2014–2018	Leganés B	119	(11)
2016–2018	Leganés	1	(0)
2018–2019	Alcobendas Sport	36	(3)
2019–2020	Villarrubia	27	(0)
2020–2022	Internacional Madrid	18	(0)
2022	Villanovense	7	(0)
2022–2023	Ourense	9	(1)
2023	La Unión Atlético	14	(2)
2023–2024	Las Rozas	27	(1)
2024–	Marchamalo	5	(2)
- * Club domestic league appearances and goals as of 13 October 2024

Sergio Arribas Blázquez (born 7 July 1995) is a Spanish footballer who plays as an attacking midfielder for Marchamalo.

== Club career ==
Born in Leganés, Madrid, Arribas represented Real Madrid and CD Leganés as a youth. He made his senior debut with the latter's reserves in 2014, in the regional leagues.

On 21 December 2016 Arribas made his first team debut, coming on as a late substitute for Darwin Machís in a 1–2 away loss against Valencia CF for the season's Copa del Rey. He made his La Liga debut on 17 April 2018, replacing José Naranjo in a 1–2 loss against Villarreal CF.
