= 2016–17 Gimnàstic de Tarragona season =

Gimnàstic de Tarragona
2016–17 season
- President: Josep María Andreu
- Manager: Nano Rivas
- Segunda División: 14th
- Copa del Rey: Round of 32
- Copa Catalunya (friendly): Champions
- Top goalscorer: League: Ike Uche (8); All: Ike Uche (8)
| Home colours | Away colours |

The 2016–17 Gimnàstic de Tarragona's season is the 130th season in the club's existence and the second consecutive in Segunda División.

== Players ==
=== Squad ===
As of 29 June 2017

| No. | Name | Position | Nat. | Place of Birth | Date of Birth (Age) | Club caps | Club goals | Int. caps | Int. goals | Signed from | Date signed | Fee | Contract End |
Goalkeepers
| 1 | Manolo Reina (c) | GK | (Spain) (Andalusia) | Trabuco | 1 April 1985 (aged 32) | 137 | 0 | – | – | Atromitos (Greece) | 30 June 2013 | Free | 30 June 2018 |
| 27 | Stole Dimitrievski | GK | (North Macedonia) | Kumanovo | 25 December 1993 (aged 23) | 11 | 0 | 7 | 0 | Granada | 16 August 2016 | Free | 30 June 2018 |
| 33 | José Perales | GK | (Spain) (Balearic Islands) | Palma | 25 May 1993 (aged 24) | – | – | – | – | Pobla | 31 July 2016 | Free | 30 June 2017 |
Defenders
| 2 | Gerard Valentín | RB | (Spain) (Catalonia) | Avinyonet | 28 July 1993 (aged 23) | 75 | 0 | – | – | Olot | 6 July 2014 | Undisc. | 30 June 2019 |
| 3 | Mossa | LB/CB | (Spain) (Valencian Community) | Valencia | 24 January 1989 (aged 28) | 117 | 2 | – | – | Levante B | 7 July 2014 | Free | 30 June 2018 |
| 4 | Xavi Molina | CB/DM | (Spain) (Catalonia) | La Canonja | 19 July 1986 (aged 30) | 135 | 8 | – | – | Atlético Baleares | 13 June 2013 | Free | 30 June 2018 |
| 5 | Iago Bouzón | CB/RB | (Spain) (Galicia (Spain)) | Redondela | 16 March 1983 (aged 34) | 55 | 1 | – | – | Córdoba | 3 July 2015 | Free | 30 June 2017 |
| 16 | Bruno Perone | CB | (Brazil) | São Paulo (São Paulo (state)) | 6 July 1987 (aged 29) | 19 | 2 | – | – | Wilmington (United States) | 31 December 2016 | Free | 30 June 2017 |
| 18 | Daisuke Suzuki | CB | (Japan) | Tokyo | 29 January 1990 (aged 26) | 51 | 1 | 2 | 0 | Kashiwa Reysol (Japan) | 16 February 2016 | Free | 30 June 2018 |
| 24 | Mohammed Djetei | CB | (Cameroon) | Yaoundé | 18 August 1994 (aged 22) | 11 | 0 | 2 | 0 | Union Douala (Cameroon) | 4 July 2016 | Undisc. | 30 June 2020 |
| 36 | Marc Vadillo | CB | (Spain) (Catalonia) | Tarragona | 15 March 1994 (aged 23) | – | – | – | – | Pobla | 14 October 2015 | Free | 30 June 2017 |
| 37 | Ruxi | CB | (Spain) (Catalonia) | Valls | 11 April 1995 (aged 22) | – | – | – | – | Pobla | 11 November 2016 | Free | 30 June 2017 |
| — | Manolo Martínez | CB/DM | (Spain) (Valencian Community) | Bigastro | 15 June 1980 (aged 36) | 120 | 4 | – | – | Levadiakos (Greece) | 6 August 2014 | Free | 30 June 2017 |
Midfielders
| 6 | Wilfried Zahibo | CM/DM | (France) | Marseille | 21 August 1993 (aged 23) | 17 | 0 | – | – | Valencia B | 8 July 2016 | Free | 30 June 2019 |
| 7 | José Carlos | RW/LW | (Spain) (Andalusia) | Minas de Riotinto | 17 July 1987 (aged 29) | 12 | 2 | – | – | Llagostera | 5 July 2016 | Free | 30 June 2017 |
| 8 | Lévy Madinda | CM | (Gabon) | Libreville | 11 June 1992 (aged 25) | 52 | 1 | 41 | 5 | Celta | 12 July 2016 | Loan | 30 June 2017 |
| 9 | Cristian Lobato | LW/RW | (Spain) (Catalonia) | Esparreguera | 7 March 1989 (aged 28) | 49 | 2 | – | – | Asteras Tripoli (Greece) | 26 November 2015 | Free | 30 June 2018 |
| 10 | Juan Muñiz | LW/RW/AM | (Spain) (Asturias) | Gijón | 14 March 1992 (aged 25) | 42 | 5 | – | – | Sporting Gijón | 8 January 2016 | Free | 30 June 2018 |
| 12 | Jean Luc | RW/LW | (Ivory Coast) | Lakota | 8 August 1992 (aged 24) | 100 | 10 | – | – | Villarreal B | 13 July 2013 | Free | 30 June 2017 |
| 15 | Juan Delgado | RW/AM | (Chile) | Chillán | 5 March 1993 (aged 24) | 27 | 4 | 5 | 1 | Colo-Colo (Chile) | 5 August 2016 | €455K | 30 June 2020 |
| 17 | Luismi | DM | (Spain) (Andalusia) | Puerto Serrano | 5 May 1992 (aged 25) | 14 | 1 | – | – | Valladolid | 29 December 2016 | Loan | 30 June 2017 |
| 19 | Amadou Boiro | DM | (Senegal) | Ziguinchor | 15 December 1995 (aged 21) | 2 | 0 | – | – | Casa Sports (Senegal) | 1 September 2016 | Undisc. | 30 June 2021 |
| 20 | Miguel Ángel Cordero | DM/CM | (Spain) (Andalusia) | Lebrija | 10 September 1987 (aged 29) | 20 | 1 | – | – | AEK Athens (Greece) | 30 August 2016 | Free | 30 June 2017 |
| 23 | Sergio Tejera | CM/AM | (Spain) (Catalonia) | Barcelona | 28 May 1990 (aged 27) | 75 | 6 | – | – | Espanyol | 8 July 2015 | Free | 30 June 2020 |
| 25 | Achille Emaná | AM/ST | (Cameroon) | Yaoundé | 5 June 1982 (aged 35) | 57 | 13 | 42 | 6 | Tokushima Vortis (Japan) | 12 December 2016 | Free | 30 June 2017 |
| 26 | Rayco Rodríguez | AM | (Spain) (Canary Islands) | Las Palmas | 24 November 1996 (aged 20) | 1 | 0 | – | – | Pobla | 30 November 2016 | Free | 30 June 2018 |
Forwards
| 11 | Álex López | ST | (Spain) (Catalonia) | Calafell | 18 September 1993 (aged 23) | 50 | 6 | – | – | Valencia B | 26 July 2015 | Undisc. | 30 June 2019 |
| 14 | Ike Uche | ST | (Nigeria) | Aba | 5 January 1984 (aged 33) | 24 | 8 | 46 | 19 | Tigres UANL (Mexico) | 10 August 2016 | Free | 30 June 2017 |
| 21 | Ferrán Giner | SS/LB/LW | (Spain) (Valencian Community) | Alboraya | 27 September 1988 (aged 28) | 96 | 3 | – | – | Olímpic | 25 June 2013 | Free | 30 June 2017 |
| 22 | Manu Barreiro | ST | (Spain) (Galicia (Spain)) | Compostela | 8 July 1986 (aged 30) | 19 | 5 | – | – | Alavés | 22 December 2016 | Free | 30 June 2017 |
| 30 | Stephane Emaná | ST | (Cameroon) | Yaoundé | 17 June 1994 (aged 22) | 24 | 4 | – | – | Pobla | 15 March 2014 | Free | 30 June 2019 |
| 38 | Iván Vidal | ST | (Spain) (Catalonia) | Reus | 8 August 1995 (aged 21) | – | – | – | – | Pobla | 30 November 2016 | Free | 30 June 2017 |

=== Technical staff ===
| Position | Staff |
|---|---|
| Head coach | Nano Rivas |
| Assistant manager | Xisco Muñoz |
| Goalkeeper coach | Manuel Oliva |
| Fitness coach | Jordi Abella |
| Fitness coach | Alejandro Prieto |
| Scout | Santi Coch |
| Technical analyst | Miguel Ángel Muñoz |
| Doctor | Carles Hernàndez |
| Doctor | Jesús Gálvez |
| Physio | Ernest Canete |
| Physio | Víctor Rodríguez |
| Therapist | Stephanie Medina |
| Nutritionist | Albert Martínez |
| Match delegate | José Maria Grau |

Last updated: 31 December 2016
Source: Gimnàstic

=== Transfers ===
==== In ====
| No. | Pos. | Nat. | Name | Age | EU | Moving from | Type | Transfer window | Ends | Transfer fee | Source |
|---|---|---|---|---|---|---|---|---|---|---|---|
| 16 | DF | (Spain) | Moussa Bandeh | 24 | EU | Olot | Loan Return | Summer | 2017 | Free | |
| 26 | MF | (Spain) | Fali | 22 | EU | Barcelona B | Loan Return | Summer | 2017 | Free | |
| 24 | DF | (Cameroon) | Mohammed Djetei | 21 | Non-EU | Union Douala (Cameroon) | Transfer | Summer | 2020 | Undisclosed | Gimnàstic |
| 7 | MF | (Spain) | José Carlos | 28 | EU | Llagostera | Transfer | Summer | 2017 | Free | Gimnàstic |
| 20 | MF | (Spain) | Carlos García | 22 | EU | Pobla de Mafumet | Promoted | Summer | 2019 | Free | Diari de Tarragona |
| 30 | FW | (Cameroon) | Stephane Emaná | 22 | EU | Pobla de Mafumet | Promoted | Summer | 2019 | Free | Diari de Tarragona |
| 25 | DF | (Georgia (country)) | Otar Kakabadze | 20 | Non-EU | Dinamo Tbilisi (Georgia (country)) | Transfer | Summer | 2019 | Undisclosed | Gimnàstic |
| 6 | MF | (France) | Wilfried Zahibo | 22 | EU | Valencia Mestalla | Transfer | Summer | 2019 | Free | Gimnàstic |
| 8 | MF | (Gabon) | Lévy Madinda | 24 | EU | Celta Vigo | Loan | Summer | 2017 | Free | Gimnàstic |
| 28 | MF | (Spain) | Nacho Pérez | 22 | EU | Pobla de Mafumet | Promoted | Summer | 2017 | Free | Diari de Tarragona |
| 16 | FW | (Albania) | Elvir Maloku | 20 | EU | Hajduk Split (Croatia) | Transfer | Summer | 2020 | Free | Gimnàstic |
| 17 | MF | (Morocco) | Moha Rharsalla | 22 | EU | Olimpik Donetsk (Ukraine) | Loan | Summer | 2017 | Free | Gimnàstic |
| 15 | MF | (Chile) | Juan Delgado | 23 | Non-EU | Colo-Colo (Chile) | Transfer | Summer | 2020 | €455K | Gimnàstic |
| 14 | FW | (Nigeria) | Ike Uche | 32 | EU | UANL (Mexico) | Transfer | Summer | 2017 | Free | |
| 22 | DF | (Spain) | Alberto Lopo | 36 | EU | Deportivo La Coruña | Transfer | Summer | 2017 | Free | Gimnàstic |
| 27 | GK | (North Macedonia) | Stole Dimitrievski | 22 | EU | Granada | Transfer | Summer | 2018 | Free | Gimnàstic |
| 13 | GK | (Argentina) | Sebastián Saja | 37 | Non-EU | Racing Club (Argentina) | Transfer | Summer | 2017 | Free | Gimnàstic |
| 20 | MF | (Spain) | Miguel Ángel Cordero | 28 | EU | AEK Athens (Greece) | Transfer | Summer | 2017 | Free | Gimnàstic |
| 19 | MF | (Senegal) | Amadou Boiro | 20 | Non-EU | Casa Sports (Senegal) | Transfer | Summer | 2021 | Undisclosed | Gimnàstic |
| 25 | MF | (Cameroon) | Achille Emaná | 34 | EU | Tokushima Vortis (Japan) | Transfer | Winter | 2017 | Free | Gimnàstic |
| 22 | FW | (Spain) | Manu Barreiro | 30 | EU | Alavés | Transfer | Winter | 2017 | Free | Gimnàstic |
| | | (Spain) | Juan Merino | 46 | EU | Free agent | Job offer | Winter | 2017 | Free | Gimnàstic |
| 17 | MF | (Spain) | Luismi | 24 | EU | Valladolid | Loan | Winter | 2017 | Free | Gimnàstic |
| 22 | DF | (Brazil) | Bruno Perone | 29 | EU | Wilmington Hammerheads (United States) | Transfer | Winter | 2017 | Free | Diari de Tarragona |
| | | (Spain) | Nano Rivas | 36 | EU | Getafe B | Job offer | Winter | 2017 | Free | Gimnàstic |

Total spending: ▼€500,000

==== Out ====
| No. | Pos. | Nat. | Name | Age | EU | Moving to | Type | Transfer window | Transfer fee | Source |
|---|---|---|---|---|---|---|---|---|---|---|
| 28 | FW | (Spain) | José Naranjo | 21 | EU | Celta de Vigo | Transfer | Summer | €1M | Gimnàstic |
| 7 | FW | (Spain) | Xisco Muñoz | 35 | EU | Free agent | Retired | Summer | Free | Gimnàstic |
| 19 | MF | (Spain) | Miguel Palanca | 24 | EU | Korona Kielce (Poland) | Contract ended | Summer | Free | Gimnàstic |
| 20 | FW | (Spain) | Marcos de la Espada | 30 | EU | Kitchee SC (Hong Kong) | Contract ended | Summer | Free | Gimnàstic |
| 31 | GK | (Spain) | Alberto Varo | 23 | EU | Barcelona B | Loan | Summer | Free | FC Barcelona |
| 24 | MF | (Gabon) | Lévy Madinda | 24 | EU | Celta de Vigo | Loan Return | Summer | Free | Gimnàstic |
| 25 | MF | (Cameroon) | Achille Emaná | 34 | EU | Tokushima Vortis (Japan) | Contract ended | Summer | Free | Gimnàstic |
| — | FW | (Spain) | Iván Aguilar | 25 | EU | UCAM Murcia | Contract ended | Summer | Free | Gimnàstic |
| 5 | DF | (Spain) | Xisco Campos | 34 | EU | Ponferradina | Contract rescinded | Summer | Free | Gimnàstic |
| 26 | MF | (Spain) | Fali | 22 | EU | Barcelona B | Loan | Summer | Free | FC Barcelona |
| 16 | DF | (Spain) | Moussa Bandeh | 24 | EU | Badalona | Loan | Summer | Free | Gimnàstic |
| 28 | MF | (Spain) | Nacho Pérez | 22 | EU | Murcia | Loan | Summer | Free | Gimnàstic |
| 15 | MF | (Georgia (country)) | Giorgi Aburjania | 21 | Non-EU | Sevilla Atlético | Transfer | Summer | €1M | Marca |
| 10 | FW | (Spain) | Rayco | 29 | EU | Ponferradina | Contract rescinded | Summer | Free | Gimnàstic |
| 22 | DF | (Spain) | Pablo Marí | 22 | EU | Manchester City (England) | Transfer | Summer | Undisclosed | Gimnàstic |
| 13 | GK | (Cameroon) | Fabrice Ondoa | 20 | EU | Sevilla Atlético | Loan | Summer | Free | Gimnàstic |
| 20 | MF | (Spain) | Carlos García | 22 | EU | Atlético Sanluqueño | Loan | Summer | Free | Gimnàstic |
| 13 | GK | (Argentina) | Sebastián Saja | 37 | Non-EU | Free agent | Contract rescinded | Winter | Free | Gimnàstic |
| | | (Spain) | Vicente Moreno | 42 | EU | Free agent | Resigned | Winter | Free | Gimnàstic |
| 17 | MF | (Morocco) | Moha Rharsalla | 23 | EU | Olimpik Donetsk (Ukraine) | Loan ended | Winter | Free | Diari de Tarragona |
| 22 | DF | (Spain) | Alberto Lopo | 36 | EU | Free agent | Contract rescinded | Winter | Free | Gimnàstic |
| 28 | MF | (Spain) | Nacho Pérez | 22 | EU | Arenas Getxo | Contract rescinded | Winter | Free | Gimnàstic |
| | | (Spain) | Juan Merino | 46 | EU | Free agent | Contract rescinded | Winter | Free | Gimnàstic |

Total gaining: ▲€2,000,000

Balance

Total: ▲€1,545,000

=== Contracts ===
| No. | Pos. | Nat. | Name | Age | Status | Contract length | Expiry date | Source |
|---|---|---|---|---|---|---|---|---|
| — | | (Spain) | Vicente Moreno | 41 | Signed | 2 years | June 2018 | Gimnàstic |
| 3 | DF | (Spain) | Mossa | 27 | Signed | 2 years | June 2018 | Gimnàstic |
| 23 | MF | (Spain) | Sergio Tejera | 26 | Signed | 2 years | June 2018 | Gimnàstic |
| 4 | DF | (Spain) | Xavi Molina | 29 | Signed | 2 years | June 2018 | Gimnàstic |
| 1 | GK | (Spain) | Manolo Reina | 31 | Signed | 2 years | June 2018 | Gimnàstic |
| 11 | MF | (Spain) | Cristian Lobato | 27 | Signed | 2 years | June 2018 | Gimnàstic |
| 18 | DF | (Japan) | Daisuke Suzuki | 26 | Signed | 2 years | June 2018 | Gimnàstic |
| 21 | FW | (Spain) | Ferrán Giner | 27 | Signed | 1 year | June 2017 | Gimnàstic |

== Player statistics ==
=== Squad statistics ===
As of 29 June 2017

| No. | Pos | Nat | Player | Total | | Segunda División | | Copa del Rey | |
| No. | Pos | Nat | Player | Apps | Goals | Apps | Goals | Apps | Goals |
|---|---|---|---|---|---|---|---|---|---|
| 1 | GK | (Spain) ESP | Manolo Reina | 24 | 0 | 23 | 0 | 1 | 0 |
| 2 | DF | (Spain) ESP | Gerard Valentín | 35 | 0 | 29+4 | 0 | 0+2 | 0 |
| 3 | DF | (Spain) ESP | Mossa | 39 | 0 | 39 | 0 | 0 | 0 |
| 4 | DF | (Spain) ESP | Xavi Molina | 30 | 1 | 28+1 | 1 | 1 | 0 |
| 5 | DF | (Spain) ESP | Iago Bouzón | 25 | 0 | 22 | 0 | 3 | 0 |
| 6 | MF | (France) FRA | Wilfried Zahibo | 17 | 0 | 11+4 | 0 | 2 | 0 |
| 7 | FW | (Spain) ESP | José Carlos | 12 | 2 | 4+7 | 1 | 1 | 1 |
| 8 | MF | (Gabon) GAB | Lévy Madinda | 30 | 0 | 22+5 | 0 | 1+2 | 0 |
| 9 | MF | (Spain) ESP | Cristian Lobato | 29 | 1 | 19+8 | 1 | 2 | 0 |
| 10 | MF | (Spain) ESP | Juan Muñiz | 27 | 4 | 19+5 | 4 | 3 | 0 |
| 11 | FW | (Spain) ESP | Álex López | 34 | 3 | 20+12 | 3 | 1+1 | 0 |
| 12 | MF | (Ivory Coast) CIV | Jean Luc | 25 | 2 | 8+15 | 2 | 1+1 | 0 |
| 14 | FW | (Nigeria) NGR | Ike Uche | 24 | 8 | 15+9 | 8 | 0 | 0 |
| 15 | MF | (Chile) CHI | Juan Delgado | 27 | 4 | 17+7 | 4 | 2+1 | 0 |
| 16 | DF | (Brazil) BRA | Bruno Perone | 19 | 2 | 17+2 | 2 | 0 | 0 |
| 17 | MF | (Spain) ESP | Luismi | 14 | 1 | 14 | 1 | 0 | 0 |
| 18 | DF | (Japan) JPN | Daisuke Suzuki | 36 | 1 | 32+2 | 1 | 2 | 0 |
| 19 | MF | (Senegal) SEN | Amadou Boiro | 2 | 0 | 0+1 | 0 | 1 | 0 |
| 20 | MF | (Spain) ESP | Miguel Ángel Cordero | 20 | 1 | 14+3 | 1 | 2+1 | 0 |
| 21 | FW | (Spain) ESP | Ferrán Giner | 17 | 0 | 9+4 | 0 | 4 | 0 |
| 22 | FW | (Spain) ESP | Manu Barreiro | 19 | 5 | 11+8 | 5 | 0 | 0 |
| 23 | MF | (Spain) ESP | Sergio Tejera | 38 | 6 | 35+1 | 6 | 1+1 | 0 |
| 24 | DF | (Cameroon) CMR | Mohammed Djetei | 11 | 0 | 7+2 | 0 | 2 | 0 |
| 25 | MF | (Cameroon) CMR | Achille Emaná | 16 | 4 | 14+2 | 4 | 0 | 0 |
| 26 | MF | (Spain) ESP | Rayco Rodríguez | 1 | 0 | 0 | 0 | 0+1 | 0 |
| 27 | GK | (North Macedonia) MKD | Stole Dimitrievski | 11 | 0 | 9 | 0 | 2 | 0 |
| 30 | FW | (Cameroon) CMR | Stephane Emaná | 18 | 2 | 4+11 | 2 | 2+1 | 0 |
| 33 | GK | (Spain) ESP | José Perales | 0 | 0 | 0 | 0 | 0 | 0 |
| 36 | DF | (Spain) ESP | Marc Vadillo | 0 | 0 | 0 | 0 | 0 | 0 |
| 37 | DF | (Spain) ESP | Ruxi | 0 | 0 | 0 | 0 | 0 | 0 |
| 38 | FW | (Spain) ESP | Iván Vidal | 0 | 0 | 0 | 0 | 0 | 0 |
| — | DF | (Spain) ESP | Manolo Martínez | 0 | 0 | 0 | 0 | 0 | 0 |
Players on loan to other clubs:
| 16 | FW | (Albania) ALB | Elvir Maloku | 6 | 1 | 0+3 | 0 | 3 | 1 |
| 25 | DF | (Georgia (country)) GEO | Otar Kakabadze | 9 | 0 | 3+3 | 0 | 3 | 0 |
| — | GK | (Cameroon) CMR | Fabrice Ondoa | 0 | 0 | 0 | 0 | 0 | 0 |
| — | GK | (Spain) ESP | Alberto Varo | 0 | 0 | 0 | 0 | 0 | 0 |
| — | DF | (Spain) ESP | Moussa Bandeh | 0 | 0 | 0 | 0 | 0 | 0 |
| — | MF | (Spain) ESP | Carlos García | 0 | 0 | 0 | 0 | 0 | 0 |
| — | MF | (Spain) ESP | Fali | 0 | 0 | 0 | 0 | 0 | 0 |
Players who have left the club after the start of the season:
| 13 | GK | (Argentina) ARG | Sebastián Saja | 11 | 0 | 10 | 0 | 1 | 0 |
| 17 | MF | (Morocco) MAR | Moha Rharsalla | 10 | 1 | 2+6 | 1 | 1+1 | 0 |
| 22 | DF | (Spain) ESP | Alberto Lopo | 7 | 0 | 5 | 0 | 2 | 0 |
| 28 | MF | (Spain) ESP | Nacho Pérez | 0 | 0 | 0 | 0 | 0 | 0 |
| 29 | FW | (Spain) ESP | Dani Ojeda | 0 | 0 | 0 | 0 | 0 | 0 |

=== Top scorers ===
| Place | Number | Position | Nation | Name | Segunda División | Copa del Rey | Total |
|---|---|---|---|---|---|---|---|
| 1 | 14 | FW | (Nigeria) | Ike Uche | 8 | 0 | 8 |
| 2 | 23 | MF | (Spain) | Sergio Tejera | 6 | 0 | 6 |
| 3 | 22 | FW | (Spain) | Manu Barreiro | 5 | 0 | 5 |
| 4 | 10 | MF | (Spain) | Juan Muñiz | 4 | 0 | 4 |
| 4 | 15 | MF | (Chile) | Juan Delgado | 4 | 0 | 4 |
| 4 | 25 | MF | (Cameroon) | Achille Emaná | 4 | 0 | 4 |
| 5 | 11 | FW | (Spain) | Álex López | 3 | 0 | 3 |
| 6 | 12 | MF | (Ivory Coast) | Jean Luc | 2 | 0 | 2 |
| 6 | 16 | DF | (Brazil) | Bruno Perone | 2 | 0 | 2 |
| 6 | 30 | FW | (Cameroon) | Stephane Emaná | 2 | 0 | 2 |
| 6 | 7 | MF | (Spain) | José Carlos | 1 | 1 | 2 |
| 7 | 4 | DF | (Spain) | Xavi Molina | 1 | 0 | 1 |
| 7 | 9 | MF | (Spain) | Cristian Lobato | 1 | 0 | 1 |
| 7 | 17 | MF | (Spain) | Luismi | 1 | 0 | 1 |
| 7 | 17 | MF | (Morocco) | Moha Rharsalla | 1 | 0 | 1 |
| 7 | 18 | DF | (Japan) | Daisuke Suzuki | 1 | 0 | 1 |
| 7 | 20 | MF | (Spain) | Miguel Ángel Cordero | 1 | 0 | 1 |
| 7 | 16 | FW | (Croatia) | Elvir Maloku | 0 | 1 | 1 |
| TOTALS | | | | | 47 | 2 | 49 |

=== Disciplinary record ===
| Number | Nation | Position | Name | Segunda División | | Copa del Rey | | Total | |
| Number | Nation | Position | Name | Yellow card | Red card | Yellow card | Red card | Yellow card | Red card |
| 23 | (Spain) | MF | Sergio Tejera | 16 | 1 | 0 | 0 | 16 | 1 |
| 4 | (Spain) | DF | Xavi Molina | 13 | 1 | 1 | 0 | 14 | 1 |
| 3 | (Spain) | DF | Mossa | 13 | 1 | 0 | 0 | 13 | 1 |
| 5 | (Spain) | DF | Iago Bouzón | 10 | 1 | 1 | 0 | 11 | 1 |
| 6 | (France) | MF | Wilfried Zahibo | 8 | 0 | 0 | 0 | 8 | 0 |
| 20 | (Spain) | MF | Miguel Ángel Cordero | 7 | 0 | 1 | 0 | 8 | 0 |
| 15 | (Chile) | MF | Juan Delgado | 5 | 1 | 2 | 0 | 7 | 1 |
| 10 | (Spain) | MF | Juan Muñiz | 6 | 0 | 1 | 0 | 7 | 0 |
| 2 | (Spain) | DF | Gerard Valentín | 5 | 1 | 1 | 1 | 6 | 2 |
| 18 | (Japan) | DF | Daisuke Suzuki | 5 | 1 | 0 | 0 | 5 | 1 |
| 8 | (Gabon) | MF | Lévy Madinda | 5 | 0 | 0 | 0 | 5 | 0 |
| 30 | (Cameroon) | FW | Stephane Emaná | 4 | 1 | 0 | 0 | 4 | 1 |
| 1 | (Spain) | GK | Manolo Reina | 4 | 0 | 0 | 0 | 4 | 0 |
| 11 | (Spain) | FW | Álex López | 4 | 0 | 0 | 0 | 4 | 0 |
| 25 | (Cameroon) | MF | Achille Emaná | 4 | 0 | 0 | 0 | 4 | 0 |
| 22 | (Spain) | FW | Manu Barreiro | 3 | 1 | 0 | 0 | 3 | 1 |
| 25 | (Georgia (country)) | DF | Otar Kakabadze | 1 | 0 | 2 | 1 | 3 | 1 |
| 12 | (Ivory Coast) | MF | Jean Luc | 3 | 0 | 0 | 0 | 3 | 0 |
| 16 | (Brazil) | DF | Bruno Perone | 3 | 0 | 0 | 0 | 3 | 0 |
| 21 | (Spain) | FW | Ferrán Giner | 3 | 0 | 0 | 0 | 3 | 0 |
| 16 | (Croatia) | FW | Elvir Maloku | 0 | 0 | 3 | 0 | 3 | 0 |
| 14 | (Nigeria) | FW | Ike Uche | 2 | 1 | 0 | 0 | 2 | 1 |
| 24 | (Cameroon) | DF | Mohammed Djetei | 2 | 0 | 0 | 0 | 2 | 0 |
| 7 | (Spain) | MF | José Carlos | 1 | 0 | 1 | 0 | 2 | 0 |
| 27 | (North Macedonia) | GK | Stole Dimitrievski | 1 | 0 | 1 | 0 | 2 | 0 |
| 9 | (Spain) | MF | Cristian Lobato | 1 | 0 | 0 | 0 | 1 | 0 |
| 13 | (Argentina) | GK | Sebastián Saja | 1 | 0 | 0 | 0 | 1 | 0 |
| 17 | (Spain) | MF | Luismi | 1 | 0 | 0 | 0 | 1 | 0 |
| 17 | (Morocco) | MF | Moha Rharsalla | 0 | 0 | 1 | 0 | 1 | 0 |
| 19 | (Senegal) | MF | Amadou Boiro | 0 | 0 | 1 | 0 | 1 | 0 |
| TOTALS | | | | 132 | 10 | 16 | 2 | 148 | 12 |

== Competitions ==
=== Pre-season/Friendlies ===
| 20 July 2016 | Gimnàstic | 1–2 | Villarreal | Tarragona |
| | Giner (red card) 25'; Emaná 33'; Bouzón (yellow card) 36'; Muñiz (yellow card) 45' | Report | 2' Alfonso; (yellow card) 33' Trigueros; (yellow card) 72' (red card) 80' Jokić; 76' Soldado | Stadium: Nou Estadi; Referee: Medié Jiménez |

| 23 July 2016 | Gimnàstic | 1–0 | Pobla de Mafumet | Salou |
| 9:30 | Muñiz 34' (pen.) | Report | | Stadium: Complex Esportiu Futbol Salou; Attendance: 250 |

| 27 July 2016 | Ascó | 2–3 | Gimnàstic | Ascó |
| | Godía (yellow card) 23'; Peke (yellow card) 44'; Riki 61'; Gerard Roigé 82' | Report | 64' Madinda; 68' Carlos García; 88' Emaná | Stadium: Camp Municipal d'Ascó; Attendance: 1,000 |

| 30 July 2016 | Gimnàstic | 0–0 | Zaragoza | Tarragona |
| | Molina (yellow card) 47'; Kakabadze (yellow card) 67' | Report | (yellow card) 44' Ros; (yellow card) 66' Casado; (yellow card) 72' Dongou; (yellow card) 79' Zalaya | Stadium: Nou Estadi; Attendance: 3,809 |

| 3 August 2016 | Olot | 1–1 | Gimnàstic | Olot |
| | Mas 21' (yellow card) 81' | Report | (yellow card) 33' Muñiz; 84' Suzuki | Stadium: Camp Municipal d'Olot; Attendance: 1,000 |

| 6 August 2016 | Girona | 1–0 | Gimnàstic | Girona |
| | Alcaraz (yellow card) 35'; Longo (yellow card) 58'; Manel 81' | Report | (red card) 53' Valentín; (yellow card) 84' Molina | Stadium: Montilivi; Referee: Saúl Ais Reig |

| 10 August 2016 | Valencia Mestalla | 1–0 | Gimnàstic | Valencia |
| | Jordi Sánchez 28' | Report | | Stadium: Ciutat Esportiva de Paterna; Referee: Francesc Baño Solera |

| 13 August 2016 | Barcelona B | 0–1 | Gimnàstic | Barcelona |
| | Alfaro (yellow card) 40'; Fali (yellow card) 44' | Report | 35' Moha; (yellow card) 78' Delgado | Stadium: Mini Estadi; Attendance: 545; Referee: Albert Català Ferran |

=== Copa Catalunya ===
| 4 October 2016 Quarterfinal | Sant Andreu | 0–0 (2–4 p) | Gimnàstic | Sant Andreu |
| 20:30 | Alcover (yellow card) 64'; Guerrero (yellow card) 68' | Report | (yellow card) 55' Rayco; (yellow card) 71' Roger; (yellow card) 73' Bouzón | Stadium: Narcís Sala; Referee: Bondia |
| | Penalties |
| | Alcover (penalty scored); Arjona (penalty scored); Jorge Muñoz (penalty missed); Santoalla (penalty missed) | | (penalty scored) Rayco; (penalty scored) Muñiz; (penalty missed) Ricky; (penalty scored) Maloku; (penalty scored) Giner |

| 9 November 2016 Semifinal | Gavà | 0–0 (1–2 p) | Gimnàstic | Gavà |
| 21:00 | | Report | | Stadium: La Bòbila; Attendance: 200; Referee: Carballo Vázquez |
| | Penalties |
| | Cristian Herrera (penalty scored); Jordi César (penalty missed); Joel (penalty missed); Plà (penalty missed); Camps (penalty missed) | | (penalty scored) José Carlos; (penalty scored) Ruxi; (penalty missed) Roger Brugué; (penalty missed) Iván Vidal; (penalty missed) Rayco |

| 28 March 2017 Final | Gimnàstic | 0–0 (4–3 p) | Girona | Olot |
| 19:00 | José Carlos (yellow card) 88' | Report | (yellow card) 84' Sandaza | Stadium: Camp Municipal d'Olot; Attendance: 3,317; Referee: Sauleda Torrent |
| | Penalties |
| | Uche (penalty missed); Muñiz (penalty scored); José Carlos (penalty scored); Xavi Molina (penalty scored); Ferrán Giner (penalty scored) | | (penalty scored) Granell; (penalty scored) Sandaza; (penalty missed) Longo; (penalty scored) Eloi; (penalty missed) Marí |

=== Segunda División ===
| Pos | Team | Pld | W | D | L | GF | GA | GD | Pts | Promotion, qualification or relegation |
|---|---|---|---|---|---|---|---|---|---|---|
| 12 | Rayo Vallecano | 42 | 14 | 11 | 17 | 44 | 44 | 0 | 53 (Note: Rayo Vallecano finished ahead of Sevilla Atlético on head-to-head points: Rayo Vallecano 1–1 Sevilla Atlético, Sevilla Atlético 1–2 Rayo Vallecano) | |
| 13 | Sevilla Atlético | 42 | 13 | 14 | 15 | 55 | 56 | −1 | 53 | Ineligible for promotion and the Copa del Rey |
| 14 | Gimnàstic | 42 | 12 | 16 | 14 | 47 | 51 | −4 | 52 | |
| 15 | Almería | 42 | 14 | 9 | 19 | 44 | 49 | −5 | 51 | |
| 16 | Zaragoza | 42 | 12 | 14 | 16 | 50 | 52 | −2 | 50 (Note: Zaragoza and Numancia finished ahead of Alcorcón on head-to-head points: Zaragoza 7 pts, Numancia 7 pts, Alcorcón 2 pts. Zaragoza finished ahead of Numancia on head-to-head goal difference: Numancia 2–1 Zaragoza, Zaragoza 3–0 Numancia) | |

Source: La Liga
Rules for classification: 1) points; 2) head-to-head points; 3) head-to-head goal difference; 4) goal difference; 5) number of goals scored

==== Results summary ====
| Overall | | | | | | | | Home | | | | | | Away | | | | | |
| Pld | W | D | L | GF | GA | GD | Pts | W | D | L | GF | GA | GD | W | D | L | GF | GA | GD |
|---|---|---|---|---|---|---|---|---|---|---|---|---|---|---|---|---|---|---|---|
| 42 | 12 | 16 | 14 | 47 | 51 | −4 | 52 | 7 | 9 | 5 | 26 | 21 | +5 | 5 | 7 | 9 | 21 | 30 | −9 |

Last updated: 29 June 2017.
Source: Competitive matches

==== Results by round ====
| Round | 1 | 2 | 3 | 4 | 5 | 6 | 7 | 8 | 9 | 10 | 11 | 12 | 13 | 14 | 15 | 16 | 17 | 18 | 19 | 20 | 21 | 22 | 23 | 24 | 25 | 26 | 27 | 28 | 29 | 30 | 31 | 32 | 33 | 34 | 35 | 36 | 37 | 38 | 39 | 40 | 41 | 42 |
|---|---|---|---|---|---|---|---|---|---|---|---|---|---|---|---|---|---|---|---|---|---|---|---|---|---|---|---|---|---|---|---|---|---|---|---|---|---|---|---|---|---|---|
| Ground | H | A | H | A | A | H | A | H | A | H | A | H | A | H | A | H | A | H | A | H | A | A | H | A | H | H | A | H | A | H | A | H | A | H | A | H | A | H | A | H | A | H |
| Result | D | D | D | L | L | D | L | D | D | L | L | D | W | W | L | W | L | L | L | D | D | W | D | L | D | W | W | W | D | L | W | L | D | W | D | L | D | D | L | W | W | W |
| Position | 9 | 11 | 13 | 18 | 22 | 22 | 22 | 22 | 22 | 22 | 22 | 22 | 22 | 22 | 22 | 22 | 22 | 22 | 22 | 21 | 21 | 21 | 22 | 22 | 22 | 21 | 18 | 15 | 18 | 18 | 16 | 16 | 16 | 16 | 19 | 19 | 19 | 19 | 19 | 18 | 16 | 14 |

Updated to match(es) played on 29 June 2017. Source:
A = Away; H = Home; W = Win; D = Draw; L = Loss

==== Matches ====
| 21 August 2016 1 | Gimnàstic | 2–2 | Lugo | Tarragona |
| 19:00 | Molina (yellow card) 36'; Uche 66' (pen.); Álex López 90+1' | Report | 21' Pedraza; 37' (pen.) Joselu; (yellow card) 65' Miquel | Stadium: Nou Estadi; Attendance: 3,512; Referee: Guillermo Cuadra Fernández |

| 28 August 2016 2 | Huesca | 1–1 | Gimnàstic | Huesca |
| 19:00 | Carlos David (yellow card) 29'; González (yellow card) 51'; Samu Sáiz (yellow card) 77' (goal) 81' | Report | (yellow card) 33' Delgado; (yellow card) 38' Molina; (yellow card) 38' Uche; 90' Moha | Stadium: El Alcoraz; Attendance: 2,763; Referee: David Pérez Pallas |

| 4 September 2016 3 | Gimnàstic | 1–1 | Levante | Tarragona |
| 18:00 | Molina (yellow card) 41'; Zahibo (yellow card) 44'; Giner (yellow card) 51'; Bouzón (yellow card) 60'; Muñiz 85' | Report | (yellow card) 59' Roger; 64' (yellow card) 82' Chema; (yellow card) 69' Abraham | Stadium: Nou Estadi; Attendance: 4,781; Referee: Pedro Pérez Montero |

| 11 September 2016 4 | Alcorcón | 1–0 | Gimnàstic | Alcorcón |
| 18:00 | Vega (yellow card) 19' (goal) 68' | Report | (yellow card) 86' Tejera; (yellow card) 90+2' Cordero | Stadium: Santo Domingo; Attendance: 2,176; Referee: Juan López Amaya |

| 17 September 2016 5 | Numancia | 1–0 | Gimnàstic | Soria |
| 16:00 | Regalón (yellow card) 5'; Manu del Moral 15' | Report | (yellow card) 6' Delgado; (yellow card) 26' Molina; (yellow card) 58' Madinda; (red card) 85' Tejera | Stadium: Los Pajaritos; Attendance: 2,223; Referee: Juan Pulido Santana |

| 20 September 2016 6 | Gimnàstic | 0–0 | Zaragoza | Tarragona |
| 22:00 | Uche (penalty missed) 44'; Jean Luc (yellow card) 87' | Report | (yellow card) 42' Ros; (yellow card) 43' Casado; (yellow card) 79' Pombo | Stadium: Nou Estadi; Attendance: 4,255; Referee: Víctor Areces Franco |

| 24 September 2016 7 | Córdoba | 2–0 | Gimnàstic | Córdoba |
| 18:00 | Rodas (yellow card) 26'; Rodri 38' 61' (yellow card) 75' | Report | (yellow card) 27' Kakabadze; (yellow card) 55' Bouzón; (yellow card) 71' Tejera | Stadium: Nuevo Arcángel; Attendance: 13,542; Referee: Jorge Valdés Aller |

| 1 October 2016 8 | Gimnàstic | 1–1 | Sevilla Atlético | Tarragona |
| 18:00 | Uche 7'; Muñiz (yellow card) 26'; Valentín (yellow card) 62'; Tejera (yellow card) 75'; Bouzón (yellow card) 87' | Report | (yellow card) 10' Schetino; 19' (yellow card) 75' Bernardo; (yellow card) 24' (red card) 86' Carrillo; (yellow card) 80' Diego González; (yellow card) 90+3' Soriano | Stadium: Nou Estadi; Attendance: 5,206; Referee: Dámaso Arcediano Monescillo |

| 8 October 2016 9 | Elche | 4–4 | Gimnàstic | Elche |
| 18:00 | Nino 15' 19' (yellow card) 84'; José Ángel (yellow card) 40'; Matilla 62' (yellow card) 64' (red card) 85'; Pedro (yellow card) 66'; Dorca 79'; Josete (yellow card) 90+1' | Report | 12' 70' Álex López; (yellow card) 21' (red card) 90+3' Bouzón; (yellow card) 61' Mossa; (yellow card) 61' Zahibo; 67' (pen.) Tejera; 75' (yellow card) 90+2' Jean Luc; (yellow card) 77' Saja | Stadium: Martínez Valero; Attendance: 6,907; Referee: Pablo González Fuertes |

| 16 October 2016 10 | Gimnàstic | 1–2 | Valladolid | Tarragona |
| 19:00 | Uche 40'; Tejera (yellow card) 45'; Mossa (yellow card) 45+1'; Suzuki (yellow card) 55' (red card) 90+3' | Report | 26' (yellow card) 45' Villar; (yellow card) 60' Leão; 63' José; (yellow card) 73' Becerra | Stadium: Nou Estadi; Attendance: 5,087; Referee: Juan López Amaya |

| 23 October 2016 11 | Almería | 3–0 | Gimnàstic | Almería |
| 17:00 | Antonio Puertas 28' 68'; Quique (yellow card) 70' (goal) 90+2'; Trujillo (yellow card) 72'; Fidel (yellow card) 85' | Report | (yellow card) 19' (red card) 52' Valentín; (yellow card) 32' Molina; (yellow card) 85' Muñiz | Stadium: Juegos Mediterráneos; Attendance: 7,223; Referee: Gorka Saguez Oscoz |

| 30 October 2016 12 | Gimnàstic | 2–2 | Mallorca | Tarragona |
| 18:00 | Muñiz 22' (yellow card) 37'; Tejera (yellow card) 39'; Jean Luc 68'; Cordero (yellow card) 85'; Emaná (yellow card) 90+3'; Lopo (red card) 90+6' | Report | (yellow card) 21' Yuste; (yellow card) 37' Oriol; 46' 87' (yellow card) 90+5' Brandon; (yellow card) 66' Raillo; (yellow card) 90+2' Lago Junior | Stadium: Nou Estadi; Attendance: 5,731; Referee: Óliver de la Fuente Ramos |

| 6 November 2016 13 | Mirandés | 0–1 | Gimnàstic | Miranda de Ebro |
| 13:00 | Guarrotxena (yellow card) 87'; Fran Cruz (yellow card) 90+5' | Report | 56' (yellow card) 78' Muñiz; (yellow card) 77' Valentín; (yellow card) 87' Giner; (yellow card) 90+2' Dimitrievski; (yellow card) 90+4' Mossa | Stadium: Anduva; Attendance: 2,962; Referee: Guillermo Cuadra Fernández |

| 12 November 2016 14 | Gimnàstic | 1–0 | Getafe | Tarragona |
| 16:00 | Muñiz 20'; Molina (yellow card) 40'; Suzuki (yellow card) 57' | Report | (yellow card) 42' Acosta; (yellow card) 77' Lacen; (yellow card) 90+4' Molinero | Stadium: Nou Estadi; Attendance: 4,405; Referee: Juan Luis Pulido Santana |

| 20 November 2016 15 | Reus Deportiu | 1–0 | Gimnàstic | Reus |
| 13:00 | Atienza (yellow card) 36'; Ángel (yellow card) 40'; Carbià 56' | Report | (yellow card) 25' (red card) 47' Molina; (yellow card) 34' Zahibo; (yellow card) 39' Madinda | Stadium: Municipal; Attendance: 4,193; Referee: Adrián Cordero Vega |

| 25 November 2016 16 | Gimnàstic | 1–0 | Cádiz | Tarragona |
| 20:00 | José Carlos (yellow card) 48'; Uche 65'; Mossa (yellow card) 82'; Madinda (yellow card) 90+1' | Report | (yellow card) 88' Eddy | Stadium: Nou Estadi; Attendance: 5,180; Referee: Jorge Valdés Aller |

| 4 December 2016 17 | Oviedo | 1–0 | Gimnàstic | Oviedo |
| 10:00 | Toché 19' (yellow card) 43'; Susaeta (yellow card) 45+1'; Verdés (yellow card) 67'; Erice (yellow card) 72' | Report | (yellow card) 27' Valentín; (yellow card) 60' Molina; (yellow card) 69' Tejera; (yellow card) 88' Cordero | Stadium: Carlos Tartiere; Attendance: 13,615; Referee: Dámaso Arcediano Monescillo |

| 10 December 2016 18 | Gimnàstic | 0–1 | Rayo Vallecano | Tarragona |
| 10:00 | Tejera (yellow card) 5'; Mossa (yellow card) 30' | Report | (yellow card) 34' Ebert; (yellow card) 47' Quini; (yellow card) 73' Baena; 88' Guerra; (yellow card) 90+3' Embarba | Stadium: Nou Estadi; Attendance: 5,120; Referee: Pablo González Fuertes |

| 17 December 2016 19 | Girona | 4–2 | Gimnàstic | Girona |
| 14:00 | Marí (yellow card) 19'; Longo 39'; Juanpe 48'; Sandaza 73' (pen.); Herrera 88' | Report | 26' (pen.) Uche; (yellow card) 31' Giner; 42' (yellow card) 64' Tejera; (yellow card) 72' Suzuki; (yellow card) 72' Cordero; (red card) 76' Delgado; (yellow card) 83' (red card) 89' Emaná | Stadium: Montilivi; Attendance: 4,420; Referee: Juan Manuel López Amaya |

| 8 January 2017 20 | Gimnàstic | 1–1 | Tenerife | Tarragona |
| 16:00 | Bouzón (yellow card) 37'; Barreiro (yellow card) 40' (yellow-red card); José Carlos 57'; Mossa (yellow card) 74'; Perone (yellow card) 75'; Uche (yellow card) 78' | Report | 12' Cristo González; (yellow card) 40' Carlos Ruiz; (yellow card) 44' Cámara; (yellow card) 86' Camille | Stadium: Nou Estadi; Attendance: 5,360; Referee: Jorge Figueroa Vázquez |

| 14 January 2017 21 | UCAM Murcia | 1–1 | Gimnàstic | Murcia |
| 18:00 | Mejía (yellow card) 22'; Natalio 67' | Report | 33' Luismi; (yellow card) 40' Tejera; (yellow card) 69' Manolo Reina; (red card) 71' Uche; (yellow card) 81' Suzuki; (yellow card) 90+2' Mossa | Stadium: La Condomina; Attendance: 3,421; Referee: Juan Luis Pulido Santana |

| 21 January 2017 22 | Lugo | 2–3 | Gimnàstic | Lugo |
| 18:00 | Joselu 15' (pen.) 66'; Marcelo (yellow card) 26'; Seoane (yellow card) 72' | Report | (yellow card) 21' (goal) 73' Achille Emaná; 54' (yellow card) 85' (goal) 89' Stephane Emaná; (yellow card) 56' Mossa; (yellow card) 90' Tejera | Stadium: Anxo Carro; Attendance: 3,134; Referee: Valentín Pizarro Gómez |

| 28 January 2017 23 | Gimnàstic | 0–0 | Huesca | Tarragona |
| 18:00 | Álex López (yellow card) 86' | Report | (yellow card) 36' Carlos David; (yellow card) 72' Borja Lázaro; (yellow card) 86' Íñigo López | Stadium: Nou Estadi; Attendance: 5,612; Referee: Rubén Eiriz Mata |

| 5 February 2017 24 | Levante | 2–1 | Gimnàstic | Valencia |
| 18:00 | Roger 59'; Morales 67' | Report | (yellow card) 5' Luismi; (yellow card) 48' Achille Emaná; (yellow card) 63' Perone; (yellow card) 69' Bouzón; 71' Delgado | Stadium: Ciutat de València; Attendance: 11,542; Referee: Jorge Valdés Aller |

| 11 February 2017 25 | Gimnàstic | 1–1 | Alcorcón | Tarragona |
| 18:00 | Delgado 15'; Mossa (yellow card) 56'; Xavi Molina (yellow card) 67' | Report | (yellow card) 26' Owona; 36' (yellow card) 41' Bakić; (yellow card) 90' Alejo | Stadium: Nou Estadi; Attendance: 5,043; Referee: Juan Manuel López Amaya |

| 18 February 2017 26 | Gimnàstic | 2–0 | Numancia | Tarragona |
| 18:00 | Cordero 48' (yellow card) 79'; Bouzón (yellow card) 70'; Tejera 89' | Report | (yellow card) 32' Ripa | Stadium: Nou Estadi; Attendance: 4,590; Referee: Francisco Manuel Arias López |

| 26 February 2017 27 | Zaragoza | 1–2 | Gimnàstic | Zaragoza |
| 20:00 | Ángel 5' | Report | (yellow card) 15' Bouzón; (yellow card) 24' Tejera; 30' (yellow card) 78' Delgado; 73' Suzuki; (yellow card) 80' Djetei; (yellow card) 86' Madinda | Stadium: La Romareda; Attendance: 15,277; Referee: Jorge Figueroa Vázquez |

| 5 March 2017 28 | Gimnàstic | 2–1 | Córdoba | Tarragona |
| 18:00 | Emaná (yellow card) 5'; Perone 18'; Bouzón (yellow card) 28'; Cordero (yellow card) 75'; Barreiro 90+5'; Álex López (yellow card) 90+6' | Report | 9' Rodri; (red card) 16' Pedro Ríos; (yellow card) 59' Caballero; (yellow card) 79' Razak | Stadium: Nou Estadi; Attendance: 9,121; Referee: Saúl Ais Reig |

| 12 March 2017 29 | Sevilla Atlético | 2–2 | Gimnàstic | Seville |
| 16:00 | Ivi 55' 57'; Bernardo (yellow card) 65' | Report | 45' Delgado; (yellow card) 50' Cordero; 71' Emaná; (yellow card) 90+3' Xavi Molina | Stadium: Sánchez Pizjuán; Attendance: 2,003; Referee: Javier Alberola Rojas |

| 17 March 2017 30 | Gimnàstic | 1–3 | Elche | Tarragona |
| 20:00 | Djetei (yellow card) 65'; Álex López (yellow card) 81'; Barreiro 86' | Report | 14' Fabián; 24' (o.g.) Djetei; 32' Nino; (yellow card) 88' Túñez | Stadium: Nou Estadi; Attendance: 6,109; Referee: Eduardo Prieto Iglesias |

| 25 March 2017 31 | Valladolid | 1–2 | Gimnàstic | Valladolid |
| 16:00 | Villar 54' (pen.); Lichnovsky (yellow card) 82' | Report | 38' Perone; (yellow card) 45' Suzuki; (yellow card) 53' Xavi Molina; 74' Barreiro; (yellow card) 90+2' Reina; (yellow card) 90+3' Lobato | Stadium: José Zorrilla; Attendance: 7,289; Referee: Rubén Eiriz Mata |

| 2 April 2017 32 | Gimnàstic | 0–1 | Almería | Tarragona |
| 12:00 | Tejera (yellow card) 83'; Zahibo (yellow card) 90+4' | Report | (yellow card) 17' Joaquín; (yellow card) 42' Morcillo; 72' Uche; (yellow card) 88' Ximo Navarro; (yellow card) 90+1' Juanjo | Stadium: Nou Estadi; Attendance: 6,357; Referee: Aitor Gorostegui Fernández Ortega |

| 8 April 2017 33 | Mallorca | 0–0 | Gimnàstic | Palma |
| 16:00 | Zdjelar (yellow card) 32'; Yuste (yellow card) 55'; Angeliño (yellow card) 75' | Report | (yellow card) 45+2' Mossa; (yellow card) 69' Xavi Molina; (yellow card) 90+4' Muñiz | Stadium: Iberostar Stadium; Attendance: 9,842; Referee: Pedro Jesús Pérez Montero |

| 15 April 2017 34 | Gimnàstic | 4–1 | Mirandés | Tarragona |
| 18:00 | Zahibo (yellow card) 12'; Xavi Molina 39'; Tejera 68'; Lobato 71'; Emaná 88' (pen.) | Report | (yellow card) 3' Guarrotxena; 11' Álex García; (yellow card) 38' Roberto | Stadium: Nou Estadi; Attendance: 4,587; Referee: Juan Luis Pulido Santana |

| 22 April 2017 35 | Getafe | 1–1 | Gimnàstic | Getafe |
| 18:00 | Portillo 25'; Cala (yellow card) 66'; Molinero (yellow card) 67'; Mora (yellow card) 77'; Díaz (yellow card) 90+2' | Report | (yellow card) 16' Mossa; 46' A. Emaná; (yellow card) 68' Tejera | Stadium: Coliseum Alfonso Pérez; Attendance: 10,175; Referee: Pablo González Fuertes |

| 1 May 2017 36 | Gimnàstic | 0–1 | Reus | Tarragona |
| 19:00 | Zahibo (yellow card) 18'; Perone (yellow card) 42'; Emaná (yellow card) 90+3' | Report | (yellow card) 89' Olmo; 90' Máyor; (yellow card) 90+1' Vítor; (yellow card) 90+3' Édgar | Stadium: Nou Estadi; Attendance: 9,409; Referee: Valentín Pizarro Gómez |

| 7 May 2017 37 | Cádiz | 0–0 | Gimnàstic | Cádiz |
| 18:00 | Salvi (yellow card) 43' | Report | (yellow card) 35' Zahibo; (yellow card) 37' Bouzón; (yellow card) 40' (yellow-red card) Mossa; (yellow card) 81' Valentín | Stadium: Ramón de Carranza; Attendance: 13,278; Referee: Saúl Ais Reig |

| 13 May 2017 38 | Gimnàstic | 2–2 | Oviedo | Tarragona |
| 20:45 | Álex López (yellow card) 32'; Tejera 59' 81'; Molina (yellow card) 70'; Jean Luc (yellow card) 84'; Emaná (yellow card) 88' | Report | 17' (yellow card) 66' De Pena; 24' Toché | Stadium: Nou Estadi; Attendance: 7,196; Referee: Pedro Jesús Pérez Montero |

| 19 May 2017 39 | Rayo Vallecano | 2–0 | Gimnàstic | Madrid |
| 17:00 | Amaya (yellow card) 35'; Manucho 48'; Embarba 59'; Jordi Gómez (yellow card) 68'; Fran Beltrán (yellow card) 71'; Trashorras (yellow card) 73'; Gazzaniga (yellow card) 80' | Report | (yellow card) 75' Tejera | Stadium: Vallecas; Attendance: 9,800; Referee: Francisco Manuel Arias López |

| 28 May 2017 40 | Gimnàstic | 3–1 | Girona | Tarragona |
| 17:00 | Barreiro 50'; Uche 60' 68'; Muñiz (yellow card) 66'; Reina (yellow card) 80'; Zahibo (yellow card) 90+1' | Report | 1' Maffeo; (yellow card) 90+2' Juanpe | Stadium: Nou Estadi; Attendance: 8,179; Referee: Eduardo Prieto Iglesias |

| 4 June 2017 41 | Tenerife | 0–1 | Gimnàstic | Santa Cruz de Tenerife |
| 17:00 | Tyronne (yellow card) 62'; Amath (yellow card) 65' | Report | 60' Uche; (yellow card) 65' Delgado; (yellow card) 66' Reina; (yellow card) 70' Muñiz; (yellow card) 71' Mossa; (yellow card) 74' Madinda; (yellow card) 90+3' Tejera; (yellow card) 90+8' Barreiro | Stadium: Heliodoro Rodríguez López; Attendance: 19,348; Referee: Aitor Gorostegui Fernández Ortega |

| 11 June 2017 42 | Gimnàstic | 1–0 | UCAM Murcia | Tarragona |
| 17:00 | Tejera (yellow card) 45+1'; Barreiro 90+1' (yellow card) 90+2' | Report | (yellow card) 44' Salvador; (yellow card) 74' Milla | Stadium: Nou Estadi; Attendance: 8,894; Referee: Guillermo Cuadra Fernández |

=== Copa del Rey ===
| 7 September 2016 2 | Gimnàstic | 1–0 | Numancia | Tarragona |
| 19:00 | Maloku (yellow card) 57'; Muñiz (yellow card) 59'; Valentín (yellow card) 85' (red card) 113'; José Carlos 100' (yellow card) 101' | Report | (yellow card) 49' Escassi; (yellow card) 110' Medina | Stadium: Nou Estadi; Referee: Gorka Saguez Oscoz |

| 12 October 2016 3 | Rayo Vallecano | 1–1 (4–5 p) | Gimnàstic | Madrid |
| 17:00 | Manucho 51' (yellow card) 76'; Beltrán (yellow card) 60'; Quini (yellow card) 68'; Trashorras (yellow card) 81' | Report | 24' (yellow card) 44' Maloku; (yellow card) 87' Molina; (yellow card) 88' Delgado; (yellow card) 90' Rharsalla; (yellow card) 90' Dimitrievski | Stadium: Campo de Fútbol de Vallecas; Referee: Rubén Eiriz Mata |
| | Penalties |
| | Trashorras (penalty missed); Zé Castro (penalty scored); Nacho (penalty missed); Miku (penalty scored); Manucho (penalty scored); Beltrán (penalty scored); Quini (penalty missed) | | (penalty scored) Madinda; (penalty scored) Kakabadze; (penalty missed) Álex López; (penalty missed) Emaná; (penalty scored) Rharsalla; (penalty scored) Suzuki; (penalty scored) Molina |

| 1 December 2016 16th finals | Gimnàstic | 0–3 | Alavés | Tarragona |
| 15:00 | Boiro (yellow card) 26'; Delgado (yellow card) 61'; Bouzón (yellow card) 63'; Maloku (yellow card) 71'; Kakabadze (yellow card) 90+2' | Report | 15' 52' Toquero; 63' (yellow card) 83' Santos; (yellow card) 64' Manu García | Stadium: Nou Estadi; Attendance: 3,032; Referee: Santiago Jaime Latre |

| 22 December 2016 16th finals | Alavés | 3–0 | Gimnàstic | Vitoria-Gasteiz |
| 14:00 | Édgar 12'; Sobrino 31' (pen.); Krstičić 40'; Katai (yellow card) 54' | Report | (yellow card) 27' (red card) 30' Kakabadze; (yellow card) 56' Cordero | Stadium: Mendizorrotza; Attendance: 11,043; Referee: Carlos Clos Gómez |
