= 2016–17 Copa Catalunya =

Catalonia Cup

Tournament details
- Country: Catalonia
- Teams: 30

Tournament statistics
- Matches played: 28
- Goals scored: 66 (2.36 per match)

The 2016–17 Copa Catalunya was the 28th staging of the Copa Catalunya. The competition began on 30 July 2016 and was played by teams in Segunda División, Segunda División B, Tercera División and the top teams of Primera Catalana.

== Qualified teams ==
The following teams compete in the 2016–17 Copa Catalunya.

3 teams of 2015–16 Segunda División

- Gimnàstic
- Girona
- Llagostera

9 teams of 2015–16 Segunda División B

- Reus Deportiu
- Lleida Esportiu
- Cornellà
- Sabadell
- Barcelona B
- Espanyol B
- 'Badalona
- L'Hospitalet
- Olot

16 teams of 2015–16 Tercera División

- Prat
- Gavà
- Europa
- Vilafranca
- Montañesa
- Sant Andreu
- Cerdanyola
- Júpiter
- Figueres
- Ascó
- Palamós
- Terrassa
- Manlleu
- Santfeliuenc
- Granollers
- Masnou

2 teams of 2015–16 Primera Catalana

- Castelldefels
- Vilassar de Mar

== Tournament ==
=== First round ===
- Bye: Olot

| 29 July 2016 | Gavà | 2–0 | Espanyol B | Gavà |
| 20:30 | Sascha 58'; Sarmiento 83' | Report | | Stadium: La Bòbila; Referee: Sergi Carrero Romera |

| 30 July 2016 | Júpiter | 0–1 | Prat | Barcelona |
| 19:00 | | | 4' Rosillo | Stadium: La Verneda |

| 30 July 2016 | Vilassar de Mar | 2–2 (4–5 p) | Cornellà | Vilassar de Mar |
| 19:00 | Brian 22'; Viale 76' | Report | 51' Gallego; 89' Ahmed | Stadium: Xevi Ramon; Referee: Óscar Carballo Vázquez |
| | Penalties |
| | Penalty scored Penalty missed | | (penalty scored) Gallego; (penalty scored) Abraham; (penalty scored) Édgar; (penalty scored) Antonio; (penalty scored) Serra; (penalty scored) Sierra |

| 30 July 2016 | Sant Andreu | 1–0 | L'Hospitalet | Barcelona |
| 19:00 | Carroza 35' | Report | | Stadium: Narcís Sala; Referee: Fernández Morillo |

| 30 July 2016 | Ascó | 0–0 (4–5 p) | Lleida Esportiu | Ascó |
| 19:30 | | | | Stadium: Municipal |

| 30 July 2016 | Montañesa | 1–1 (5–4 p) | Granollers | Barcelona |
| 20:00 | | | | Stadium: Nou Barris |

| 30 July 2016 | Vilafranca | 1–1 (5–4 p) | Reus Deportiu | Vilafranca del Penedès |
| 20:00 | | | | Stadium: Municipal |

| 31 July 2016 | Castelldefels | 0–2 | Badalona | Castelldefels |
| 19:00 | | | 70' Èric Latorre; 72' Moussa | Stadium: Els Canyars |

| 31 July 2016 | Europa | 1–2 | Masnou | Barcelona |
| 19:00 | Reverter 15' | | 70', 87' Mendo | Stadium: Nou Sardenya |

| 31 July 2016 | Manlleu | 1–3 | Barcelona B | Manlleu |
| 19:00 | Manel Sala 29' | | 27' Perea; 34', 73' Cardona | Stadium: Municipal |

| 31 July 2016 | Terrassa | 1–0 | Santfeliuenc | Terrassa |
| 19:30 | Borges 81' | | | Stadium: Olímpic |

| 31 July 2016 | Cerdanyola | 0–2 | Sabadell | Cerdanyola del Vallès |
| 20:00 | | | 25' Batanero; 93' Padilla | Stadium: Les Fontetes |

| 31 July 2016 | Figueres | 5–0 | Palamós | Figueres |
| 20:00 | Revert 4'; Bonaventura 13'; Adrià 53'; Quimo 80'; Pep Chavarria 83' | | | Stadium: Vilatenim |

=== Second round ===
| 6 August 2016 | Masnou | 0–3 | Lleida Esportiu | El Masnou |
| 18:45 | | Report | 23', 53' Doncel; 40' Valiente | Stadium: Municipal; Referee: Gerard Brull Acerete |

| 6 August 2016 | Prat | 2–1 | Sabadell | El Prat de Llobregat |
| 19:30 | Piera 5'; Ignacio 56' | Report | 65' Carreño | Stadium: Sagnier; Referee: José Antonio Fernández Morillo |

| 6 August 2016 | Gavà | 3–2 | Terrassa | Gavà |
| 19:30 | Camps 51'; Sarmiento 88'; Cazorla 90' (pen.) | Report | 12' Grasa; 23' Alberto | Stadium: La Bòbila |

| 7 August 2016 | Sant Andreu | 1–0 | Montañesa | Barcelona |
| 19:00 | Luismi 11' | Report | | Stadium: Narcís Sala; Referee: David Congost Larrosa |

| 7 August 2016 | Figueres | 2–2 (3–1 p) | Olot | Figueres |
| 20:00 | Revert 44'; Cunill 84' | Report | 29', 31' Mas | Stadium: Vilatenim; Attendance: 600; Referee: Rubén Mancera Antón |
| | Penalties |
| | Revert (penalty scored); Del Campo (penalty scored); Molist (penalty scored) | | (penalty scored); (penalty missed) Blázquez; (penalty missed) Santos; (penalty missed) Mas |

| 7 August 2016 | Cornellà | 0–2 | Barcelona B | Cornellà de Llobregat |
| 20:00 | | Report | 47' Mújica; 78' Alfaro | Stadium: Nou Camp; Referee: Muñoz Vaquero |

| 9 August 2016 | Vilafranca | 1–1 (3–5 p) | Badalona | Vilafranca del Penedès |
| 20:30 | Josu 29' | Report | 76' Moussa | Stadium: Municipal; Attendance: 300; Referee: Miguel Angel Moreno Villaécija |
| | Penalties |
| | Oribe (penalty scored); Díez (penalty missed); Castillo (penalty scored); Bernat (penalty scored) | | (penalty scored) Moussa; (penalty scored) Pi; (penalty scored) Coch; (penalty scored) Guzmán; (penalty scored) Agudo |

=== Third round ===
- Bye: Prat

| 12 August 2016 | Sant Andreu | 2–1 | Barcelona B | Barcelona |
| 20:00 | Sekou 57'; Toro 69' | Report | 67' Alfaro | Stadium: Narcís Sala; Attendance: 1,500; Referee: García Fuster |

| 14 August 2016 | Gavà | 5–1 | Figueres | Gavà |
| 19:30 | Garrós 30', 42', 62'; Sascha 48', 59' | Report | 20' Revert | Stadium: La Bòbila; Referee: Gómez Meneses |

| 24 August 2016 | Badalona | 3–1 | Lleida Esportiu | Badalona |
| 19:00 | Robusté 10'; Agudo 84'; Moussa 90' | | 86' Martí | Stadium: Montigalà; Referee: Gerard Castellet Julia |

=== Fourth round ===
- Bye: Badalona

| 5 October 2016 | Prat | 0–3 | Girona | El Prat de Llobregat |
| 20:00 | | Report | 4', 84' Cristian Herrera; 64' Granell | Stadium: Sagnier; Attendance: 550; Referee: Rodríguez Enríquez |

| 5 October 2016 | Gavà | 0–0 (6–5 p) | Llagostera | Gavà |
| 20:00 | | Report | | Stadium: La Bòbila; Referee: Montoro Ferreiro |
| | Penalties |
| | Cazorla (penalty scored); David Jiménez (penalty missed); Jordi César (penalty scored); Fernando (penalty scored); Camps (penalty scored); Plà (penalty scored); Nico Kata (penalty scored) | | (penalty scored) Marc Martínez; (penalty scored) Albarrán; (penalty missed) Setti; (penalty scored) Masó; (penalty scored) Shafa; (penalty scored) Soufiane; (penalty missed) Carlos Martínez |

| 5 October 2016 | Sant Andreu | 0–0 (2–4 p) | Gimnàstic | Barcelona |
| 20:30 | | Report | | Stadium: Narcís Sala; Referee: Bondia |
| | Penalties |
| | Alcover (penalty scored); Arjona (penalty scored); Jorge Muñoz (penalty missed); Santoalla (penalty missed) | | (penalty scored) Rayco; (penalty scored) Muñiz; (penalty missed) Ricky; (penalty scored) Maloku; (penalty scored) Giner |

=== Semifinals ===
| 9 November 2016 | Gavà | 0–0 (1–2 p) | Gimnàstic | Gavà |
| 21:00 | | Report | | Stadium: La Bòbila; Attendance: 200; Referee: Carballo Vázquez |
| | Penalties |
| | Cristian Herrera (penalty scored); Jordi César (penalty missed); Joel (penalty missed); Plà (penalty missed); Camps (penalty missed) | | (penalty scored) José Carlos; (penalty scored) Ruxi; (penalty missed) Roger Brugué; (penalty missed) Iván Vidal; (penalty missed) Rayco |

| 15 February 2017 | Badalona | 0–1 | Girona | Badalona |
| 19:30 | | Report | 71' Cámara | Stadium: Montigalà; Attendance: 1,000; Referee: Carrero Romera |
Note: Match was initially scheduled to be played on 9 November, but was postponed.

=== Final ===
28 March 2017
19:00

| Gimnàstic | 0–0 | Girona |
|---|---|---|
| | Report |
Penalties
| Uche (penalty missed); Muñiz (penalty scored); José Carlos (penalty scored); Xavi Molina (penalty scored); Ferrán Giner (penalty scored) | 4–3 | (penalty scored) Granell; (penalty scored) Sandaza; (penalty missed) Longo; (penalty scored) Eloi; (penalty missed) Marí |

Camp Municipal d'Olot, Olot
Attendance: 3,317
Referee: Sauleda Torrent

| Gimnàstic | Girona |

Espanyol:
| GK | 33 | (Spain) José Perales |
| RB | 2 | (Spain) Gerard Valentín | | (substituted off) 76' |
| CB | 3 | (Spain) Ruxi | | (substituted off) 72' |
| CB | 4 | (Spain) Xavi Molina (c) |
| LB | 21 | (Spain) Ferrán Giner |
| DM | 6 | (France) Wilfried Zahibo |
| DM | 22 | (Spain) Marc Vadillo |
| RW | 7 | (Spain) José Carlos | (yellow card) 88' |
| AM | 10 | (Spain) Juan Muñiz |
| LW | 12 | (Ivory Coast) Jean Luc |
| CF | 14 | (Nigeria) Ike Uche |
Substitutes:
| GK | 1 | (Spain) Manolo Reina |
| DF | 5 | (Spain) Roger Figueras | | (substituted in) 72' |
| MF | 8 | (Spain) Brugui |
| FW | 9 | (Spain) Iván Vidal |
| MF | 11 | (Spain) Avi |
| MF | 15 | (Spain) Adri Gimeno |
| MF | 18 | (Spain) Gabri Vidal | | (substituted in) 76' |
| DF | 20 | (Spain) Iván de Nova |
| FW | 25 | (Cameroon) Achille Emaná |
Manager:
(Spain) Juan Merino

Barcelona:
| GK | 1 | (Spain) René Román |
| RB | 17 | (Spain) Cifu | | (substituted off) 79' |
| CB | 2 | (Spain) Pablo Marí |
| CB | 22 | (Spain) Kiko Olivas |
| LB | 11 | (Spain) Aday Benítez | | (substituted off) 79' |
| CM | 14 | (Spain) Rubén Alcaraz | | (substituted off) 79' |
| CM | 27 | (Spain) Marc Carbó |
| RW | 17 | (Spain) Felipe Sanchón | | (substituted off) 64' |
| AM | 10 | (Spain) Eloi Amagat (c) |
| LW | 23 | (Spain) Juan Cámara | | (substituted off) 64' |
| CF | 16 | (Spain) Cristian Herrera | | (substituted off) 79' |
Substitutes:
| GK | 13 | (Poland) Marcel Lizak |
| MF | 6 | (Spain) Álex Granell | | (substituted in) 79' |
| MF | 9 | (Spain) Portu | | (substituted in) 79' |
| FW | 12 | (Italy) Samuele Longo | | (substituted in) 79' |
| MF | 20 | (Spain) Sebas Coris | | (substituted in) 64' |
| FW | 21 | (Spain) Fran Sandaza | (yellow card) 84' | (substituted in) 64' |
| MF | 24 | (Spain) Borja García |
| DF | 25 | (Spain) Pablo Maffeo |
| DF | 29 | (Spain) Chele | | (substituted in) 79' |
Manager:
(Spain) Pablo Machín
