= David Sánchez (footballer, born 1978) =

Spanish footballer

Personal information
- Full name: David Sánchez Parrilla
- Date of birth: 13 December 1978 (age 47)
- Place of birth: Tarragona, Spain
- Height: 1.75 m (5 ft 9 in)
- Position: Right back

Youth career
- Espanyol

Senior career*
| Years | Team | Apps | (Gls) |
| 1996–1999 | Espanyol B | 69 | (1) |
| 1999 | → Lleida (loan) | 1 | (0) |
| 1999–2000 | Real Madrid B | 29 | (0) |
| 2000–2001 | Espanyol B | 35 | (0) |
| 2001–2002 | Aurrerá Vitoria | 24 | (0) |
| 2002–2004 | Terrassa | 32 | (0) |
| 2004–2005 | Gramenet | 26 | (0) |
| 2005–2007 | Badalona | 54 | (0) |
| 2007–2009 | Girona | 25 | (0) |
| 2009–2012 | Mahonés | 72 | (0) |
| 2012–2013 | Ascó | 35 | (1) |

International career
| 1995 | Spain U16 | 5 | (0) |
| 1995 | Spain U17 | 3 | (0) |
| 1996 | Spain U18 | 2 | (0) |
- * Club domestic league appearances and goals as of 1 June 2013

David Sánchez Parrilla (born 13 December 1978) is a Spanish former footballer who played as a right back.
