= CF Sporting Mahonés =

Spanish football team

Sporting Mahonés
- Full name: Club de Fútbol Sporting Mahonés
- Founded: 1974
- Dissolved: 2012
- Ground: Bintaufa, Mahón, Balearic Islands, Spain
- Capacity: 3,000
- 2011–12: 2ªB – Group 3, W
Home colours	Away colours

Club de Fútbol Sporting Mahonés was a Spanish football team based in Mahón, Menorca, in the autonomous community of Balearic Islands prior to its 2012 dissolution.

== History ==
C.F. Sporting Mahonés resulted from the merger of two other teams from Mahón, Club Deportivo Menorca and Unión Deportiva Mahón, in July 1974. They began life in the regional divisions of Balearic football before progressing to the Tercera División in 1977–78.

Between formation and 1978, Sporting played at two locations close to the centre of town, starting out at the former home of CD Menorca, the Campo Municipal de San Carlos. The following season saw the club play at the Estadio Mahonés, which had been the home of UD Mahón. More latterly home matches were played at the 3,000 seat capacity Estadio Bintaufa, situated to the south of the city, close to the Aeronautic Club.

On 24 January 2012, the team announced it was withdrawing from the Segunda División B, in mid-season, due to the fact that practically all the professional squad had left the club. With debts of over 230,000 euros and a transfer embargo in place, the club could not raise a team for the remainder of the season. Their final game was a 0–6 defeat at Sant Andreu, and just one year after the club withdrew from all competitions, on the 20 May 2013, the directives of the club agreed to dissolve Sporting Mahonés.

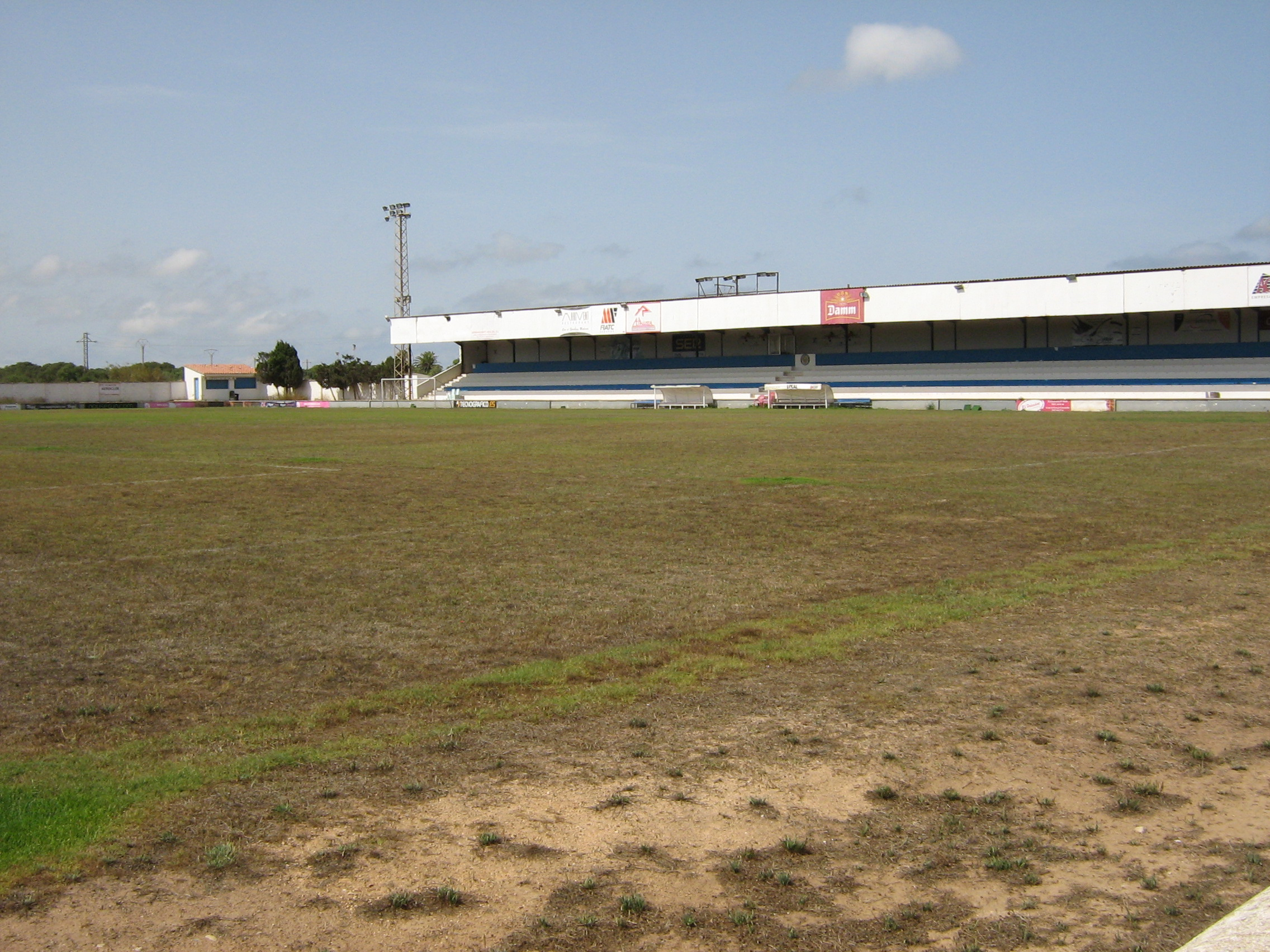
Estadi de Binitaufa

Just only a month after Sporting Mahonés disappeared, old directives of the club created a phoenix club named CF Sporting de Mahón, which currently plays in the Regional Preferente de Menorca, the regional league of Menorca. Despite the efforts done by the current directives of Sporting de Mahón to make their team able to be promoted, the club has never been promoted to Tercera División/Tercera Federación in its history of 11 years. However, Sporting de Mahón plays in the exact same location as Sporting Mahonés, in an artificial field located just few meters of Estadio Binitaufa.

== Season to season ==
Season	Tier	Division	Place	Copa del Rey
1974–75	4	Reg. Pref.	1st	
1975–76	4	Reg. Pref.	1st	
1976–77	4	Reg. Pref.	1st	
1977–78	4	3ª	14th	
1978–79	4	3ª	11th	
1979–80	4	3ª	5th	
1980–81	4	3ª	4th	
1981–82	4	3ª	4th	
1982–83	4	3ª	8th	
1983–84	4	3ª	6th	
1984–85	4	3ª	6th	
1985–86	4	3ª	4th	
1986–87	4	3ª	1st	
1987–88	3	2ª B	14th	
1988–89	3	2ª B	5th	
1989–90	3	2ª B	8th	
1990–91	3	2ª B	12th	
1991–92	3	2ª B	12th	
1992–93	3	2ª B	19th	

Season	Tier	Division	Place	Copa del Rey
1993–94	4	3ª	6th	
1994–95	4	3ª	10th	
1995–96	4	3ª	14th	
1996–97	4	3ª	10th	
1997–98	4	3ª	3rd	
1998–99	4	3ª	11th	
1999–2000	4	3ª	5th	
2000–01	4	3ª	14th	
2001–02	4	3ª	16th	
2002–03	4	3ª	14th	
2003–04	4	3ª	16th	
2004–05	4	3ª	4th	
2005–06	4	3ª	4th	
2006–07	4	3ª	13th	
2007–08	4	3ª	9th	
2008–09	4	3ª	2nd	
2009–10	3	2ª B	14th	
2010–11	3	2ª B	15th	
2011–12	3	2ª B	(W)	

- 9 seasons in Segunda División B
- 26 seasons in Tercera División

== Last squad ==
According to Futbolme. Updated on 29 July 2011

Note: Flags indicate national team as defined under FIFA eligibility rules; some limited exceptions apply. Players may hold more than one non-FIFA nationality.

No.	Pos.	Nation	Player
1	GK	ESP	Eloi Rubio
12	GK	ESP	Oliver Fernández
2	DF	ESP	Carlos Barreda
3	DF	ESP	Biel Medina
4	DF	ESP	Camacho
5	DF	ESP	David Sánchez
6	DF	ESP	Jeroni Fullana
13	DF	ESP	Lluis Micaló
14	DF	ESP	Raúl Capó
7	MF	ESP	Berto Vaquero
8	MF	ESP	Iray Pérez

No.	Pos.	Nation	Player
9	MF	ESP	Joan Barber
10	MF	ESP	Jose Moyano
11	MF	ESP	Nacho del Moral
15	MF	ESP	Ton Alcover
16	FW	ESP	Arkaitz Miguel
17	FW	ESP	Antonio Corbella
18	FW	ESP	Genís Solduga
19	FW	ESP	Ignasi Sintes
20	FW	GAM	Momodou Lamin
—	M	ESP	Joan Esteva

== Notable former players ==
- (Equatorial Guinea) Ruslan Elá
- (Spain) Vicente Engonga
- (Spain) Torres Mestre
- (Spain) Joaquín Moso
