= Rayco Rodríguez =

Spanish footballer

Rayco
Personal information
- Full name: Rayco Rodríguez Medina
- Date of birth: 24 November 1996 (age 29)
- Place of birth: Las Palmas, Spain
- Height: 1.78 m (5 ft 10 in)
- Position: Winger

Team information
- Current team: Persita Tangerang
- Number: 7

Youth career
- Almenara
- Las Palmas
- 2012–2015: Acodetti

Senior career*
Years	Team	Apps	(Gls)
2015–2016	Betis B	23	(2)
2016–2018	Pobla Mafumet	62	(12)
2016	Gimnàstic	0	(0)
2018–2020	Polvorín	59	(21)
2020–2021	Deportivo B	11	(4)
2021	Deportivo La Coruña	11	(0)
2021–2022	Unionistas	36	(5)
2022–2024	Amorebieta	66	(5)
2024–2025	Alcorcón	35	(4)
2025–	Persita Tangerang	40	(8)
- * Club domestic league appearances and goals as of 31 October 2026

Rayco Rodríguez Medina (born 24 November 1996), known as Rayco Rodríguez or simply Rayco, is a Spanish professional footballer who plays for Indonesian club Persita Tangerang. Mainly a right winger, he can also play as an attacking midfielder.

== Club career ==
Born in Las Palmas, Canary Islands, Rayco represented UD Almenara, UD Las Palmas and Acodetti CF as a youth. On 6 August 2015, after impressing on a trial, he joined Real Betis and was immediately assigned to the reserves in Segunda División B.

Rayco made his senior debut on 22 August 2015, starting in a 0–1 home loss against Mérida AD. His first goal came on 4 October, but in a 2–4 loss against Real Jaén also at the Ciudad Deportiva Luis del Sol.

On 8 July 2016, Rayco moved to another reserve team, CF Pobla de Mafumet in Tercera División. On 1 December he made his first team debut, coming on as a late substitute for Elvir Maloku in a 0–3 home loss against Deportivo Alavés for the season's Copa del Rey.

On 11 July 2018, free agent Rayco signed a two-year deal with CD Lugo, being assigned to the farm team in the fourth tier. On 31 August 2020, he joined Deportivo de La Coruña's B-team also in division four.

On 2 February 2021, Rayco was definitely promoted to Depor's first team in Primera División RFEF. He continued to appear in that division in the following years, representing Unionistas de Salamanca CF and SD Amorebieta; with the latter, he was a first-choice as the club achieved promotion to Segunda División.

On 16 July 2024, Rayco moved to Alcorcón in Primera Federación.

== Honours ==
Individual

- Super League Player of the Month: March 2026
