= Stephane Emaná =

Cameroonian footballer (born 1994)

Personal information
- Full name: Stephane Onesime Emaná
- Date of birth: 17 June 1994 (age 32)
- Place of birth: Yaoundé, Cameroon
- Height: 1.81 m (5 ft 11 in)
- Position: Forward

Team information
- Current team: Yeclano
- Number: 19

Youth career
- Betis
- 2011–2012: Xerez

Senior career*
Years	Team	Apps	(Gls)
2011–2013	Xerez B	25	(18)
2013	Xerez	3	(0)
2013–2016	Pobla Mafumet	79	(23)
2014–2018	Gimnàstic	25	(4)
2018	→ Atlético Madrid B (loan)	9	(2)
2018–2019	Hércules	15	(3)
2019–2020	Ebro	24	(1)
2020–2021	Valencia B	17	(3)
2021–2023	Teruel	62	(13)
2023–2024	Águilas	15	(3)
2024–2025	Salamanca UDS	26	(2)
2025–2026	Xerez Deportivo	11	(0)
2026–	Yeclano	13	(1)
- * Club domestic league appearances and goals as of 15 May 2026

Stephane Onesime Emaná (born 17 June 1994) is a Cameroonian professional footballer who plays for Spanish Segunda Federación club Yeclano as a forward.

== Club career ==
Born in Yaoundé, Emaná graduated from Real Betis' youth system, but left the club in September 2011, after failing to obtain a Spanish nationality. Late in the month he joined Xerez CD, and made his senior debut in the 2011–12 campaign by scoring 15 goals in only 19 matches with the reserve side in Tercera División.

In July 2012 Emaná was called up to the pre-season with the main squad, but subsequently remained with the B's. He made his professional debut on 17 February of the following year, in a 0–3 Segunda División away loss against CD Numancia.

On 26 July 2013 Emaná signed a two-year deal with Gimnàstic de Tarragona, being assigned to its farm team also in the fourth level. On 4 January 2016 he extended his contract until 2019, after appearing once with the first team in Segunda División B.

Emaná appeared with the main squad for the second time on 9 January 2016, coming on as a first-half substitute for injured Marcos de la Espada in a 1–2 home loss against CD Lugo; his brother also appeared for Nàstic in the match. Eight days later he scored his first professional goal, netting the last in a 3–1 win at Deportivo Alavés, receiving an assist from his brother.

On 18 January 2018, Emaná was loaned to Atlético Madrid B in the third division, for six months. Upon returning, he terminated his contract on 1 August, and signed for Hércules CF two days later. His first season at the team from Alicante ended in early February 2019 due to an ankle injury.

== Personal life ==
His older brother, Achille, is also a footballer. A midfielder, he represented Cameroon in more than 40 occasions.
