= Álex López (footballer, born 1993) =

Spanish footballer

Personal information
- Full name: Alejandro López de Groot
- Date of birth: 18 September 1993 (age 33)
- Place of birth: Calafell, Spain
- Height: 1.87 m (6 ft 1 1/2 in)
- Position: Striker

Youth career
- 2008–2010: Reus
- 2010–2011: Barcelona
- 2011–2012: Reus

Senior career*
| Years | Team | Apps | (Gls) |
| 2012–2014 | Reus | 59 | (13) |
| 2014–2015 | Valencia B | 34 | (11) |
| 2015–2017 | Gimnàstic | 45 | (5) |
| 2017–2021 | Mallorca | 55 | (13) |
| 2019–2020 | → Extremadura (loan) | 15 | (0) |
| 2022 | CF Badalona Futur | 7 | (0) |
| 2022–2023 | UE Cornellà | 22 | (1) |
- * Club domestic league appearances and goals as of 01:22, 9 May 2025 (UTC)

Alejandro 'Álex' López de Groot (born 18 September 1993) is a Spanish footballer who plays as a striker.

== Club career ==
Born in Calafell, Tarragona, Catalonia, to a Dutch mother and a Spanish father. He is a grandson of Dutch cyclist Daan de Groot. López graduated with CF Reus Deportiu's youth setup, after a short stint at FC Barcelona. He made his debuts as a senior in the 2011–12 campaign, in Segunda División B.

On 3 July 2014, after scoring 12 goals during the previous season López moved to Valencia CF, being assigned to the reserves also in the third tier. On 17 May of the following year, he scored five goals in an 8–2 away routing of Real Zaragoza B, taking his tally up to 11.

On 26 July 2015, López signed a four-year deal with Gimnàstic de Tarragona, newly promoted to Segunda División. He made his professional debut on 23 August, starting in a 2–2 home draw against Albacete Balompié.

López scored his first professional goal on 10 October 2015, netting the equalizer in a 2–2 draw at SD Ponferradina. On 8 October of the following year, he scored a brace in a 4–4 away draw against Elche CF.

On 10 July 2017, López was transferred to RCD Mallorca, freshly relegated to the third tier. On 7 August 2019, after achieving two consecutive promotions with the club, he was loaned to second division side Extremadura UD for one year. During the end of his time at Mallorca, he struggled with injuries and became a free agent.

In November 2021, López was announced at Costa Brava.

On 30 August 2022, López was announced at UE Cornellà.
