= Amadou Boiro =

Senegalese footballer (1995–2019)

Personal information
- Full name: Amadou Boiro
- Date of birth: 15 December 1995
- Place of birth: Ziguinchor, Senegal
- Date of death: 30 June 2019 (aged 23)
- Place of death: Turkey
- Height: 1.80 m (5 ft 11 in)
- Position: Midfielder

Youth career
- 2012–2013: Ndangane

Senior career*
Years	Team	Apps	(Gls)
2013–2014	Linguère		
2014–2016	Casa Sports		
2016–2017	Gimnàstic	1	(0)
2017–2018	Laçi	0	(0)
2018–2019	Çarşambaspor	22	(2)

International career
2012–2015	Senegal U20		
- * Club domestic league appearances and goals as of 21 April 2019

Amadou Boiro (15 December 1995 – 30 June 2019) was a Senegalese footballer who played as a defensive midfielder.

== Club career ==
Boiro represented Ndangane Foot, ASC Linguère and Casa Sports back in his homeland. On 1 September 2016 he signed for Spanish Segunda División club Gimnàstic de Tarragona; initially assigned to the farm team in Tercera División, he officially joined the team in October.

Boiro made his professional debut on 12 November 2016, coming on as a late substitute for goalscorer Juan Muñiz in a 1–0 home win against Getafe CF; it was his maiden appearance for the club. The following August, he was released by the club and moved to Albania, signing with KF Laçi.

== Death ==
On 30 June 2019, Boiro's former club Casa Sports announced his death; it was later announced that he died in Turkey due to a "short illness".
