= Wilfried Zahibo =

Footballer (born 1993)

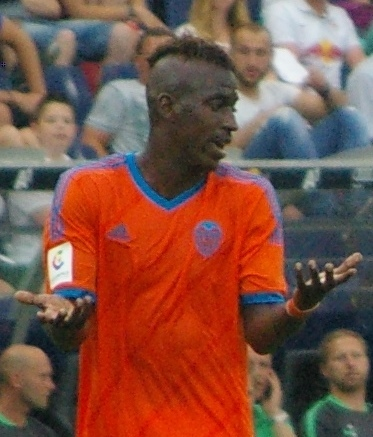
- Zahibo playing for Valencia in 2015

Personal information
- Full name: Wilfried Aimeric Jocelyn Ziri Zahibo
- Date of birth: 21 August 1993 (age 33)
- Place of birth: Marseille, France
- Height: 1.89 m (6 ft 2 in)
- Position: Defensive midfielder

Youth career
- 2008–2010: Sète
- 2010–2012: Ajaccio

Senior career*
Years	Team	Apps	(Gls)
2012–2013	Ajaccio B	26	(0)
2013	Ajaccio	0	(0)
2013–2014	Ponferradina	0	(0)
2013–2014	→ Fuenlabrada (loan)	19	(0)
2014–2016	Valencia B	68	(3)
2015–2016	Valencia	2	(0)
2016–2018	Gimnàstic	21	(0)
2018–2020	New England Revolution	58	(5)
2020	Houston Dynamo	4	(0)
2021	Dundalk	12	(0)
2022–2023	Borgo	12	(0)
2025–	FCM Aubervilliers	0	(0)

International career
2019–2021	Central African Republic	6	(0)
- * Club domestic league appearances and goals as of 22:07, 13 July 2023 (UTC)

Wilfried Aimeric Jocelyn Ziri Zahibo (born 21 August 1993) is a professional footballer who plays as a defensive midfielder for FCM Aubervilliers. Born in France, he played for the Central African Republic national team.

== Early life ==
Zahibo was born in the 4th arrondissement of Marseille, France to an Ivorian father born in Gagnoa, Ivory Coast, and a Central African mother. When he was young, his family moved to Guadeloupe for his dad's work. He acquired French nationality on 29 January 1998 through the collective effect of his father's naturalization.

Zahibo began playing football when he was 8 years old. When he was 14, he moved back to France and lived with his uncle in Sète in hopes of pursuing football professionally. He played in the youth teams of FC Sète 34 before joining the youth ranks of AC Ajaccio.

== Club career ==
=== Ajaccio ===
Zahibo joined the academy of AC Ajaccio in 2010. During the 2011–12 season, he made 2 appearances for the Ajaccio reserve team in the Championnat de France Amateur 2, the 5th tier of French football. The following year, Zahibo established himself in the side, making 24 appearances for the reserve team. On 5 January 2013, he made his first team debut for Ajaccio against FC Rouen in the Coupe de France. Zahibo scored his first professional goal in the 88th minute to level the score at one all, but Ajaccio would lose 3–2 on penalties.

=== Fuenlabrada ===
Zahibo rejected a new contract from Ajaccio in 2013 after expressing his desire to play in Spain and wanting more first team chances. In August 2013, he signed with SD Ponferradina of the Spanish Segunda División and was sent on loan to Segunda División B club CF Fuenlabrada. He made his Fuenlabrada debut on 25 August 2013 in a 0–0 draw with Barakaldo CF. Zahibo played in 19 of a possible 21 league games during his time with Fuenlabrada.

=== Valencia ===
On 23 January 2014, Zahibo signed with Valencia CF, being initially assigned to the B-side. He made his Valencia B debut on 25 January in a 3–0 loss to CD Olímpic de Xàtiva. He made 11 appearances during his first season with Valencia B. Zahibo established himself as a key player for the reserves during the 2014–15 season, making 33 appearances and scoring twice as he helped Valencia B avoid relegation to the 4th tier.

Zahibo started the 2015–16 season with the B team before being promoted to the Valencia first team. On 16 December, he made his debut for the first team, playing the full 90 of a 2–0 win over Barakaldo CF in the Copa del Rey. He scored his first goal for the first team on 14 January in 3–0 win in a Copa del Rey match against Granada CF. Zahibo made his first La Liga appearance on 24 January, playing 60 minutes in a 1–1 draw at Deportivo de La Coruña. The 2015–16 saw Zahibo make 7 total appearances and score one goal for the first team, while also making 24 for Valencia B.

=== Gimnàstic ===
On 8 July 2016, Zahibo signed a three-year deal with Segunda División side Gimnàstic de Tarragona. He made his debut for Gimnàstic on 21 August, starting in a 2–2 home draw against CD Lugo. Zahibo made 15 appearances in the league, helping them to a 14th-place finish, along with 2 more appearances in the Copa del Rey during his first season with Gimnàstic.

He played 7 times for Nàstic in the 2017–18 season before agreeing to terminate his contract on 5 January 2018.

=== New England Revolution ===
On 11 January 2018 Zahibo signed with Major League Soccer side New England Revolution. He made his debut for the Revolution on 3 March in a 2–0 loss to the Philadelphia Union. He picked up 2 assists on 24 March to help the Revs to a 2–2 draw with New York City FC. On 6 April Zahibo scored his first goal for the Revolution and added an assist to help New England get a 4–0 win over the Montreal Impact. The performance saw Zahibo be named to the MLS Team of the Week. On 5 May he scored 2 goals, however New England lost the game 4–2 to Montreal. He ended his first season in New England with 4 goals and 4 assists from 31 MLS regular season appearances as well as 1 appearance in the U.S. Open Cup. However the Revs finished 8th in the Eastern Conference, 9 points off the final playoff spot. Zahibo received MLS All-Star honors for 2018, and played in the 2018 MLS All-Star Game against Juventus.

Zahibo scored his first goal of the 2019 season on 24 August in a 2–1 win over the Chicago Fire. On 29 September, he had an assist in a 2–0 Revolution win against NYCFC to clinch a playoff spot for the Revolution in their penultimate game of the regular season. Zahibo ended the regular season with 24 games, 1 goal and 1 assist, helping New England to a 7th-place finish in the Eastern Conference. He also had 1 assists from 2 games in the Open Cup. Zahibo started the Revs' playoff game, however they would lose 1–0 to Atlanta United.

Zahibo played in the first 2 games of the 2020 season before the season was paused in March due to the COVID-19 pandemic. MLS returned to play in July with the MLS is Back Tournament. Zahibo missed the Revolution's first 2 games of the tournament due to an injury, but returned on 21 July for the final game of the group stage, a 0–0 draw with Toronto FC. He started the round of 16 matchup with the Philadelphia Union, but the Revs would lose 1–0.

=== Houston Dynamo ===
On 17 August 2020, Zahibo was traded to the Houston Dynamo in exchange for Tommy McNamara and an international roster spot. with New England also acquiring $175,000 of General Allocation Money spread over 2020 and 2021. He made his Dynamo debut on 2 September, coming on as a substitute in a 3–0 win over Minnesota United. He made his first start on 9 September in a 1–1 draw at the Colorado Rapids, but was substituted at half time. Zahibo missed the next 5 games with a thigh injury. On 7 October he returned to action, coming on as a late substitute in a 2–0 win over FC Dallas. He ended the season making 4 appearances for the Dynamo. It was a poor season for Houston, ending the year last in the Western Conference, missing out on the playoffs. His contract option was declined by Houston following their 2020 season.

=== Dundalk ===
Zahibo signed for League of Ireland Premier Division club Dundalk on 17 April 2021. He made his debut 3 days later in a 1–1 draw away to Derry City, replacing Sam Stanton from the bench in the 65th minute at the Ryan McBride Brandywell Stadium. His first start for the club came on 24 April in a 2–1 win over Drogheda United in the Louth Derby at Oriel Park. He made a total of 18 appearances during his time with the club, including 5 in their UEFA Europa Conference League campaign.

== International career ==
Zahibo was eligible to represent France, Ivory Coast and the Central African Republic through his birthplace, his father's and his mother's, respectively. In October 2019, he was called up by the latter for a friendly match against Niger, but he did not appear in the game. Zahibo was called up again in November for qualifiers for the 2021 Africa Cup of Nations. He made his international debut on 13 November, coming on as a substitute in a 2–0 win over Burundi. Zahibo got his first start for Les Fauves on 19 November in a 2–0 loss to Mauritania.

== Personal life ==
Zahibo is fluent in French, Spanish and English. He has a son.

== Career statistics ==
As of 14 January 2022

Appearances and goals by club, season and competition
Club	Season	League			National Cup (Note: Appearances in Coupe de France, Copa del Rey, and U.S. Open Cup)		League Cup (Note: Appearances in Coupe de la Ligue and MLS Cup Playoffs)		Continental		Other		Total	
Club	Season	Division	Apps	Goals	Apps	Goals	Apps	Goals	Apps	Goals	Apps	Goals	Apps	Goals
Ajaccio B	2011–12	CFA 2	2	0	—		—		—		—		2	0
Ajaccio B	2012–13	CFA 2	24	0	—		—		—		—		24	0
Ajaccio B	Total		26	0	0	0	0	0	0	0	0	0	26	0
Ajaccio	2012–13	Ligue 1	0	0	1	1	0	0	—		—		1	1
Ponferradina	2013–14	Segunda División	0	0	0	0	—		—		—		0	0
Fuenlabrada (loan)	2013–14	Segunda División B	19	0	0	0	—		—		—		19	0
Valencia B	2013–14	Segunda División B	11	0	—		—		—		—		11	0
Valencia B	2014–15	Segunda División B	33	2	—		—		—		—		33	2
Valencia B	2015–16	Segunda División B	24	1	—		—		—		—		24	1
Valencia B	Total		68	3	0	0	0	0	0	0	0	0	68	3
Valencia	2015–16	La Liga	2	0	5	1	—		0	0	—		7	1
Gimnàstic	2016–17	Segunda División	15	0	2	0	—		—		—		17	0
Gimnàstic	2017–18	Segunda División	6	0	1	0	—		—		—		7	0
Gimnàstic	Total		21	0	3	0	0	0	0	0	0	0	24	0
New England Revolution	2018	Major League Soccer	31	4	1	0	—		—		—		32	4
New England Revolution	2019	Major League Soccer	24	1	1	0	1	0	—		—		26	1
New England Revolution	2020	Major League Soccer	3 (Note: Includes one appearance in the MLS is Back Tournament group stage)	0	0	0	0	0	—		1 (Note: Appearance in the MLS is Back Tournament knockout stage)	0	4	0
New England Revolution	Total		58	5	2	0	1	0	0	0	1	0	64	5
Houston Dynamo	2020	Major League Soccer	4	0	0	0	—		—		—		4	0
Dundalk	2021	League of Ireland Premier Division	12	0	1	0	—		5 (Note: Appearances in the UEFA Europa Conference League)	0	—		18	0
Career total			210	8	12	2	1	0	5	0	1	0	229	10

== Honours ==
Individual

- MLS All-Star: 2018
