= Biel Medina =

Spanish footballer

Personal information
- Full name: Gabriel Medina Piris
- Date of birth: 22 March 1980 (age 46)
- Place of birth: Mahón, Spain
- Height: 1.85 m (6 ft 1 in)
- Position: Centre back

Senior career*
Years	Team	Apps	(Gls)
2001–2005	Alaior		
2005–2006	Sporting Mahonés		
2006–2007	Hospitalet	32	(2)
2007–2009	Eibar	54	(5)
2009–2011	Gimnàstic	11	(1)
2010–2011	→ Anorthosis (loan)	5	(0)
2011–2012	Sporting Mahonés	13	(0)
2012	Leganés	15	(2)
2012–2014	Lleida Esportiu	65	(4)
- * Club domestic league appearances and goals

Gabriel 'Biel' Medina Piris (born 22 March 1980 in Mahón, Menorca, Balearic Islands) is a Spanish former professional footballer who played as a central defender.
