= Ton Alcover =

Catalonian footballer

Personal information
- Full name: Antoni Alcover Roige
- Date of birth: 17 January 1990 (age 36)
- Place of birth: Móra d'Ebre, Spain
- Height: 1.75 m (5 ft 9 in)
- Position: Midfielder

Team information
- Current team: Hospitalet
- Number: 20

Youth career
- Gimnàstic

Senior career*
| Years | Team | Apps | (Gls) |
| 2009–2011 | Pobla Mafumet | 21 | (3) |
| 2009 | Gimnàstic | 1 | (0) |
| 2011 | Sporting Mahonés | 13 | (0) |
| 2012 | Llagostera | 13 | (0) |
| 2012–2013 | Ontinyent | 25 | (0) |
| 2013–2015 | Sant Andreu | 65 | (4) |
| 2015–2016 | Hospitalet | 18 | (1) |
| 2016–2021 | Sant Andreu | 85 | (12) |
| 2021– | Hospitalet | 0 | (0) |
- * Club domestic league appearances and goals as of 1 March 2020

Antoni 'Ton' Alcover Roige (born 17 January 1990) is a Spanish footballer who plays for CE L'Hospitalet as a central midfielder.

== Club career ==
Born in Móra d'Ebre, Tarragona, Catalonia, Alcover finished his football formation with local Gimnàstic de Tarragona. He made one professional appearance with the club, playing 13 minutes against SD Eibar on 20 June 2009 – in Segunda División's last matchday – after coming on as a substitute for Mingo (0–1 away loss); he spent most of his spell with the club appearing for CF Pobla de Mafumet, the farm team.

In the summer of 2011, Alcover signed for CF Sporting Mahonés in Segunda División B, reuniting with former Nàstic teammate Biel Medina.
