= Achille Emaná =

Cameroonian footballer (born 1982)

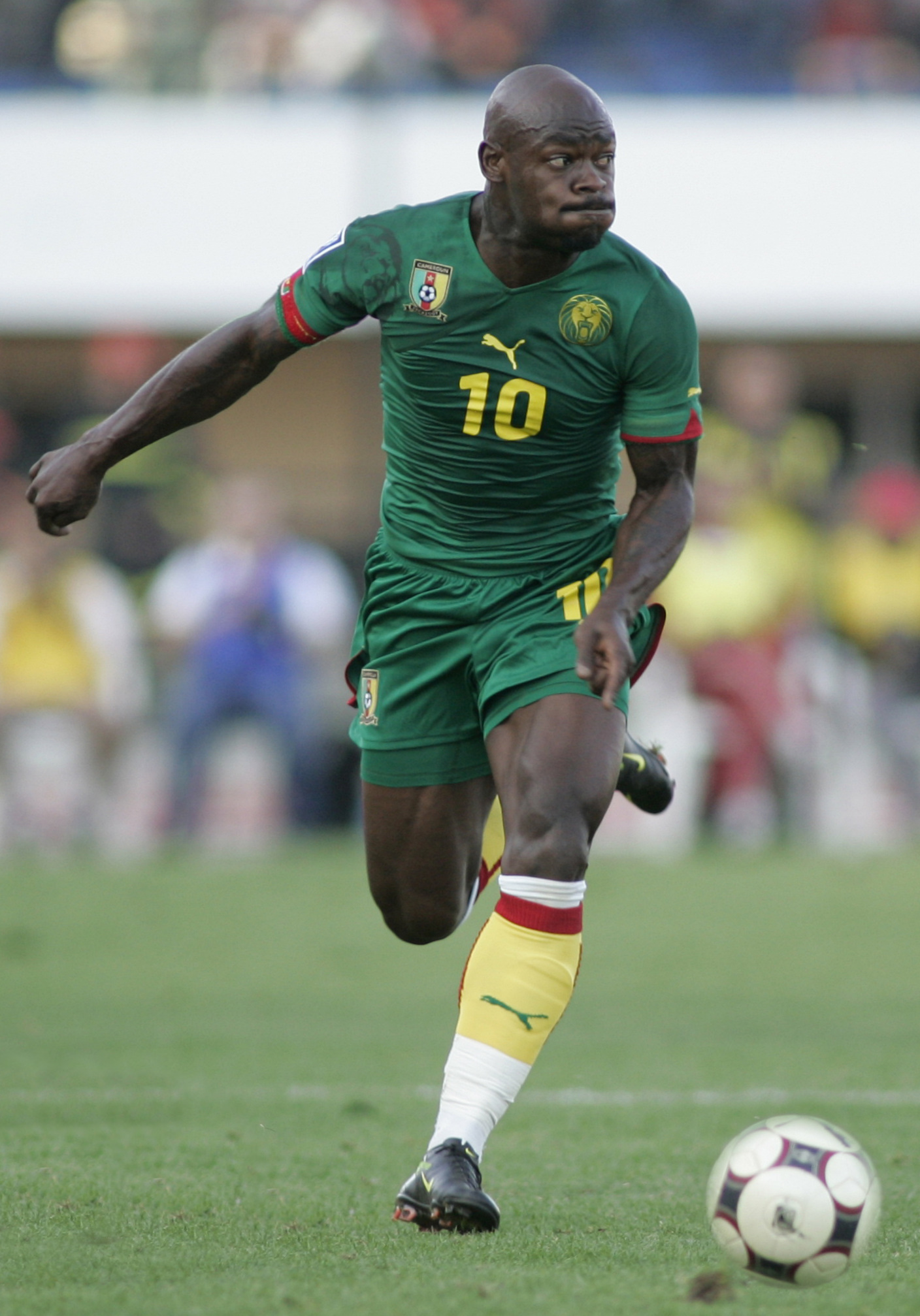
- Emaná with Cameroon in 2009

Personal information
- Full name: Achille Emaná Edzimbi
- Date of birth: 5 June 1982 (age 44)
- Place of birth: Yaoundé, Cameroon
- Height: 1.80 m (5 ft 11 in)
- Position: Attacking midfielder

Youth career
- 1997–1999: Babimbi Douala
- 1999–2000: Valencia
- 2000–2001: Toulouse

Senior career*
| Years | Team | Apps | (Gls) |
| 2001–2008 | Toulouse | 231 | (28) |
| 2008–2011 | Betis | 91 | (34) |
| 2011–2012 | Al Hilal | 11 | (4) |
| 2012 | → Al-Ahli (loan) | 11 | (2) |
| 2012–2013 | Al-Ahli | 12 | (4) |
| 2013 | → Al Wasl (loan) | 11 | (3) |
| 2013–2015 | Cruz Azul | 15 | (1) |
| 2015 | → Atlante (loan) | 9 | (0) |
| 2015–2016 | Gimnàstic | 39 | (9) |
| 2016 | Tokushima Vortis | 0 | (0) |
| 2017 | Gimnàstic | 16 | (4) |
| 2017–2018 | Mumbai City | 18 | (3) |
| 2018–2019 | Gerena | 0 | (0) |
| 2019 | Badalona | 0 | (0) |
| 2019–2020 | SS Reyes | 12 | (1) |
| 2020 | Jaén | 0 | (0) |
| Total | | 476 | (93) |

International career
| 2003–2013 | Cameroon | 42 | (6) |
Medal record
Men's football
Representing Cameroon
Africa Cup of Nations
| Runner-up | 2008 Ghana |
FIFA Confederations Cup
| Runner-up | 2003 France |
- * Club domestic league appearances and goals

Achille Emaná Edzimbi (born 5 June 1982), known as Emaná, is a Cameroonian former professional footballer who played as an attacking midfielder.

He spent most of his senior career with Toulouse in France and Betis in Spain, playing his later years in Arab countries, Mexico, Japan and India. This included two spells at Gimnàstic.

Emaná appeared 42 times for Cameroon, representing the country at the 2010 World Cup and three Africa Cup of Nations tournaments.

== Club career ==
=== Toulouse ===
Emaná was born in Yaoundé. After a brief youth spell in Spain with Valencia CF, he moved in 2000 to France and joined Toulouse FC. The following year, the 19-year-old became a starter for the Ligue 2 club, never playing less than 32 games in his first four seasons and helping the Haute-Garonne team to achieve promotion to Ligue 1 in 2002–03.

In summer 2006, Emaná was strongly linked with Portsmouth from the Premier League. He was unable, however, to obtain a work permit, and subsequently signed a new contract with Toulouse until 2011.

In the 2006–07 campaign, Emaná scored eight goals in 36 matches as the club finished a best-ever third in the top division and qualified for the UEFA Champions League. He took part in both legs of the 5–0 aggregate loss against Liverpool in the third qualifying round.

Emaná finished in 17th position in his last year at the Stadium de Toulouse, with his team being the first placed outside of the relegation zone.

=== Betis ===
On 11 June 2008, Real Betis began negotiations with Toulouse for Emaná; the player was quoted as being keen to secure a move to Spain to further his career, even though his current club had apparently already rejected two bids for his signature. On 22 July, he finally completed his transfer for a fee of £5.5 million.

Emaná scored his first goal for Betis on 19 October 2008, in a 3–0 home win over RCD Mallorca. In mid-April 2009, he added braces against Racing de Santander (3–2 away victory) and Sporting de Gijón (2–0 at home), finishing his first season with 11 goals – squad-best – and seven assists, but the Andalusians were relegated in the last matchday.

In spite of heavy speculation about his future, Emaná continued to be an essential unit in the following Segunda División seasons. The attacking trio of himself and strikers Rubén Castro and Jorge Molina combined for more than 50 league goals in 2010–11 as his side returned to the top flight after two years of absence.

=== Later career ===
On 11 August 2011, Emaná moved to Saudi Pro League club Al Hilal SFC in a deal worth US$6 million. In January 2012, he was loaned to United Arab Emirates' Shabab Al Ahli Club until June, and the move was made permanent on 27 July.

On 22 January 2013, Emaná was loaned to Al Wasl F.C. also from the UAE Pro League until the end of the season, mainly as a replacement to long-term injured Mariano Donda. On 27 August, when his loan expired, he agreed to a permanent deal with Cruz Azul from Mexico.

Emaná signed with Atlante F.C. on 17 December 2014 on loan until June, after being transfer listed. On 24 July 2015, already as a free agent, he joined Gimnàstic de Tarragona initially on trial, and subsequently signed a one-year contract.

On 20 July 2016, Emaná switched teams and countries again, joining Tokushima Vortis. With no appearances to his credit for the J2 League side, he returned to Nàstic on 12 December.

In August 2017, the 35-year-old Emaná was transferred to Indian Super League side Mumbai City FC for the upcoming season. In October 2018, he returned to Spain with CD Gerena of Tercera División, and the following January moved to Segunda División B with CF Badalona; he failed to make an appearance for either team, mainly due to bureaucratic problems, then joined UD San Sebastián de los Reyes in August, leaving on 21 January 2020.

Emaná signed for Real Jaén in summer 2020.

== International career ==
Having made his debut on 11 February 2003 in a 3–0 friendly loss against Ivory Coast in Châteauroux, Emaná was part of Cameroon's squad at that year's FIFA Confederations Cup. He also appeared for the country in the 2006 Africa Cup of Nations, where his side exited in the quarter-finals.

In July 2007, frustrated with the treatment he received whilst at the service of the national team, Emaná retired from international play. He returned shortly after, appearing in the 2008 edition of the Africa Cup of Nations where he scored against Zambia in a 5–1 group stage win; they eventually lost the final to Egypt.

Emaná represented Cameroon at the 2010 FIFA World Cup in South Africa, playing two games – two defeats – in a group-stage exit. He won 42 caps and scored six goals in ten years.

== Personal life ==
Emaná's younger brother, Stephane, was also a footballer. A forward, he too had spells at Betis (youth only) and Gimnàstic.

After retiring, Emaná worked as a model.

== Career statistics ==
=== International ===
Appearances and goals by national team and year
| National team | Year | Apps | Goals |
|---|---|---|---|
| Cameroon | 2003 | 3 | 0 |
| Cameroon | 2004 | 2 | 0 |
| Cameroon | 2005 | 2 | 0 |
| Cameroon | 2006 | 2 | 0 |
| Cameroon | 2007 | 1 | 0 |
| Cameroon | 2008 | 11 | 2 |
| Cameroon | 2009 | 6 | 2 |
| Cameroon | 2010 | 10 | 1 |
| Cameroon | 2011 | 1 | 0 |
| Cameroon | 2012 | 3 | 1 |
| Cameroon | 2013 | 1 | 0 |
| Total | | 42 | 6 |

Scores and results list Cameroon's goal tally first, score column indicates score after each Emaná goal.

List of international goals scored by Achille Emaná
| No. | Date | Venue | Opponent | Score | Result | Competition | Ref. |
|---|---|---|---|---|---|---|---|
| 1 | 26 January 2008 | Baba Yara Stadium, Kumasi, Ghana | Zambia | 3–0 | 5–1 | 2008 Africa Cup of Nations | |
| 2 | 6 September 2008 | Estádio da Várzea, Praia, Cape Verde | Cape Verde | 1–1 | 2–1 | 2010 FIFA World Cup qualification | |
| 3 | 5 September 2009 | Stade Omar Bongo, Libreville, Gabon | Gabon | 1–0 | 2–0 | 2010 FIFA World Cup qualification | |
| 4 | 10 October 2009 | Ahmadou Ahidjo Stadium, Yaoundé, Cameroon | Togo | 3–0 | 3–0 | 2010 FIFA World Cup qualification | |
| 5 | 9 January 2010 | Moi International Sports Centre, Kasarani, Kenya | Kenya | 2–1 | 3–1 | Friendly | |
| 6 | 14 October 2012 | Ahmadou Ahidjo Stadium, Yaoundé, Cameroon | Cape Verde | 1–1 | 2–1 | 2013 Africa Cup of Nations qualification | |

== Honours ==
Toulouse

- Ligue 2: 2002–03

Betis

- Segunda División: 2010–11

Al Ahli

- UAE League Cup: 2011–12

Cruz Azul

- CONCACAF Champions League: 2013–14

Cameroon

- Africa Cup of Nations runner-up: 2008
- FIFA Confederations Cup runner up: 2003
