= Marc Mas =

Spanish footballer

Personal information
- Full name: Marc Mas Costa
- Date of birth: 1 June 1990 (age 36)
- Place of birth: Sils, Spain
- Height: 1.76 m (5 ft 9 in)
- Position: Forward

Team information
- Current team: Olot
- Number: 9

Youth career
- Girona
- 2007–2009: Espanyol

Senior career*
Years	Team	Apps	(Gls)
2007	Girona	2	(0)
2009	Espanyol B	1	(0)
2009–2010	Cassà	38	(16)
2010–2011	Llagostera	19	(6)
2011	Badalona	15	(1)
2011–2012	Llagostera	25	(5)
2012–2013	Figueres	20	(12)
2013	Sant Andreu	16	(2)
2013–2014	Betis B	35	(14)
2014–2015	Guadalajara	13	(0)
2015	Badalona	15	(2)
2015–2016	Peralada	37	(21)
2016–2019	Olot	114	(45)
2019–2020	GIF Sundsvall	11	(0)
2020–2021	Linares Deportivo	21	(5)
2021–2022	La Nucía	30	(2)
2022–2023	Ibiza Islas Pitiusas	34	(6)
2023–	Olot	98	(40)
- * Club domestic league appearances and goals as of 15 May 2026

Marc Mas Costa (born 1 June 1990) is a Spanish footballer who plays as a forward for Olot.
