= Xavi Molina =

Spanish footballer (born 1986)

Personal information
- Full name: Francesc Xavier Molina Arias
- Date of birth: 19 July 1986 (age 40)
- Place of birth: La Canonja, Spain
- Height: 1.82 m (6 ft 0 in)
- Positions: Centre-back; defensive midfielder

Team information
- Current team: Reus FCR
- Number: 4

Youth career
- 1994–1998: Canonja
- 1998–2005: Reus

Senior career*
Years	Team	Apps	(Gls)
2005–2009	Reus	42	(1)
2005–2006	→ Rapitenca (loan)		
2007–2008	→ Rapitenca (loan)	30	(1)
2009–2012	Alcoyano	57	(0)
2012–2013	Atlético Baleares	36	(4)
2013–2018	Gimnàstic	167	(9)
2018–2019	Eupen	27	(2)
2019–2021	Córdoba	35	(1)
2021–2023	Badalona	63	(5)
2023–	Reus FCR	77	(3)
- * Club domestic league appearances and goals as of 7 May 2026

Francesc Xavier "Xavi" Molina Arias (born 19 July 1986) is a Spanish footballer who plays as a centre-back or defensive midfielder for Segunda Federación club Reus FC Reddis.

== Club career ==
Born in La Canonja, Tarragona, Catalonia, Molina graduated from local CF Reus Deportiu's youth academy, but made his senior debut while on loan at UE Rapitenca in the Tercera División. After being sparingly used in his return he rejoined the latter club for the 2007–08 season, where he excelled.

Molina was an undisputed starter for Reus the following campaign, appearing in 30 matches and scoring once as the team missed out promotion in the play-offs. In the summer of 2009, he signed for CD Alcoyano of the Segunda División B.

After being a regular in his first year at Alcoy, Molina missed most of his second (which ended in promotion) due to injury. On 17 December 2011 he played his first match as a professional, coming on as a second-half substitute in a 3–2 away loss against Real Murcia in the Segunda División.

Molina moved to CD Atlético Baleares of the third division on 31 July 2012. On 13 July of the following year, he joined Gimnàstic de Tarragona in the same league, earning another promotion at the end of 2014–15. He scored his first goal in the second tier on 23 August 2015, his side's first in the 2–2 home draw with Albacete Balompié.

On 7 June 2018, aged nearly 32, Molina moved abroad for the first time in his career after signing for K.A.S. Eupen. His first appearance in top-flight football took place on 29 July, in a 5–2 Belgian First Division A defeat at Club Brugge KV.

Molina returned to his country and its lower leagues subsequently, representing Córdoba CF and CF Badalona.
