= Jordi César =

Spanish footballer

Personal information
- Full name: Jordi César López Delgado
- Date of birth: 27 March 1992 (age 34)
- Place of birth: Alicante, Spain
- Height: 1.81 m (5 ft 11 1/2 in)
- Position: Defender

Team information
- Current team: Deportivo Marítimo

Youth career
- 1999–2002: Club Atlético Montemar
- 2002–2004: Hércules
- 2004–2006: Alicante
- 2006–2008: Hércules
- 2008–2009: Real Madrid
- 2009–2011: Valladolid

Senior career*
Years	Team	Apps	(Gls)
2011–2012	Valladolid B	24	(4)
2011	Valladolid	0	(0)
2012–2013	Hércules B	13	(0)
2012–2013	Hércules	5	(0)
2013–2015	Levante B	72	(2)
2014	Levante	0	(0)
2015–2016	Cultural Leonesa	10	(0)
2016–2017	Gavà	30	(0)
2017–2018	Winterthur	29	(0)
2018–2019	Unión Adarve	26	(0)
2019–2020	Nea Salamina	6	(0)
2021	Lealtad	1	(0)
2021–2022	Orihuela	10	(0)
2022	Conquense	10	(0)
2022–2024	Gandía	38	(2)
2024–2026	Atlético Pulpileño	34	(0)
2026-	Deportivo Marítimo	0	(0)
- * Club domestic league appearances and goals as of 19:39, 8 October 2025 (UTC)

Jordi César López Delgado (born 27 March 1992), known as Jordi César, is a Spanish footballer who plays as a centre-back or a left-back for Tercera Federación club CA Pulpileño.

== Club career ==
Jordi César was born in Alicante to Uruguayan ancestors, his great-grandfather Juan Delgado having played for Peñarol. He played youth football for five clubs including Hércules CF, Real Madrid and Real Valladolid, making his senior debut with the latter's B team in the 2011–12 season in the Tercera División; on 8 September 2011, he appeared in his first official game with the main squad courtesy of manager Miroslav Đukić, coming on as a late substitute in a 6–0 home win against Gimnàstic de Tarragona in the second round of the Copa del Rey.

In the summer of 2012, Jordi César returned to Hércules, initially being assigned to the reserves in the regional championships. On 2 December 2012, he played his first match in the Segunda División, at SD Huesca (45 minutes, 1–1 draw, providing the assist for Javier Portillo's late equaliser), as coach Quique Hernández had lost both left-backs – Paco Peña and Pepe Sellés – to injury.

Jordi César all but competed in the Segunda División B the following years, with Atlético Levante UD, Cultural y Deportiva Leonesa, CF Gavà and AD Unión Adarve. Abroad, he had spells at FC Winterthur in the Swiss Challenge League and Nea Salamis Famagusta FC of the Cypriot First Division.

== Honours ==
Valladolid B

- Tercera División: 2011–12
