= Moussa Bandeh =

Spanish footballer

Moussa
Personal information
- Full name: Moussa Bandeh Kandeh
- Date of birth: 2 August 1991 (age 35)
- Place of birth: Badalona, Spain
- Height: 1.88 m (6 ft 2 in)
- Positions: Left back; winger

Team information
- Current team: Rapitenca

Youth career
- Llongueras Sant Crist
- Damm
- Badalona
- Granollers
- Bufalà
- 2008–2009: Europa
- 2009–2010: Hospitalet

Senior career*
Years	Team	Apps	(Gls)
2010–2014	Hospitalet	55	(0)
2014–2015	Olot	30	(2)
2015–2017	Gimnàstic	3	(0)
2016	→ Olot (loan)	14	(1)
2016–2017	→ Badalona (loan)	33	(1)
2017–2019	Lleida Esportiu	61	(5)
2019–2020	Linense	18	(1)
2020–2021	Badalona	20	(4)
2021–2022	Eldense	26	(2)
2022–2023	Tudelano	11	(1)
2023	Prat	12	(1)
2023–	Rapitenca	6	(0)
- * Club domestic league appearances and goals as of 15 October 2023

Moussa Bandeh Kandeh (born 2 August 1991), simply known as Moussa, is a Spanish footballer who plays as either a left back or a left winger for UE Rapitenca.

== Club career ==
Born in Badalona, Barcelona, Catalonia, Moussa graduated with CE L'Hospitalet's youth setup, and was promoted to the main squad in July 2010. He made his senior debut on 26 September, starting in a 0–0 away draw against UD Alzira in the Segunda División B.

On 8 July 2014, Moussa moved to UE Olot, also in the third level. On 12 March of the following year, after being an undisputed starter for the side, he renewed his contract for a further year.

On 5 July 2015, Moussa signed a two-year deal with neighbouring Gimnàstic de Tarragona, newly promoted to the Segunda División. He made his professional debut on 5 September, starting in a 1–0 home win against Girona FC.

On 18 January 2016, after being rarely used, Moussa returned to his previous club Olot, on loan until June. On 16 July he moved to CF Badalona, a club he already represented as a youth, again in a temporary deal.

On 23 June 2017, Moussa signed a two-year deal with Lleida Esportiu.
