= Ferrán Giner =

Spanish footballer (born 1988)

Personal information
- Full name: Ferrán Giner Peris
- Date of birth: 27 September 1988 (age 38)
- Place of birth: Alboraya, Spain
- Height: 1.76 m (5 ft 9 1/2 in)
- Position: Winger

Team information
- Current team: Acero

Youth career
- Valencia

Senior career*
| Years | Team | Apps | (Gls) |
| 2007–2008 | Alboraya | | |
| 2008–2009 | Castellón B | 33 | (4) |
| 2009–2010 | Burjassot | 21 | (1) |
| 2010–2011 | Olímpic Xàtiva | 32 | (1) |
| 2011–2012 | Alzira | 42 | (8) |
| 2012–2013 | Olímpic Xàtiva | 37 | (4) |
| 2013–2017 | Gimnàstic | 84 | (3) |
| 2017–2019 | Mallorca | 16 | (3) |
| 2019 | Ibiza | 14 | (1) |
| 2019–2020 | Gimnàstic | 14 | (0) |
| 2020–2021 | Orihuela | 23 | (0) |
| 2021–2023 | Atlético Saguntino | 42 | (3) |
| 2023– | Acero | 12 | (0) |
- * Club domestic league appearances and goals as of 01:30, 27 April 2023 (UTC)

Ferrán Giner Peris (born 27 September 1988) is a Spanish footballer who plays for CD Acero. Mainly a left winger, he can also play as a forward or a left-back.

== Club career ==
Born in Alboraya, Valencian Community, Giner grew in the youth ranks of local Valencia CF. He made his senior debut with Alboraya UD in 2007 in the regional leagues.

Giner subsequently represented CD Castellón B, Burjassot CF, CD Olímpic de Xàtiva and UD Alzira in the Tercera División. He only made his Segunda División B debut in 2013, while playing for Olímpic.

On 25 June 2013, Giner signed a one-year deal with Gimnàstic de Tarragona also of the third division. On 10 July of the following year he renewed his contract for a further two years, winning promotion to Segunda División at the end of the season.

Giner's first match as a professional took place on 23 August 2015 (one month shy of his 27th birthday), when he started in a 2–2 home draw against Albacete Balompié. On 31 August 2017, he joined third-tier club RCD Mallorca, being sidelined for the remainder of the campaign after suffering a knee injury in November.

Giner was given the medical clearance in June 2018, after winning promotion. He managed only eight appearances subsequently (six as a substitute, one goal against Real Oviedo in the second round of the Copa del Rey), terminating his contract the following 28 January and moving to UD Ibiza shortly after.

On 20 June 2019, Giner reached an agreement to sever his ties with Ibiza, and returned to Nàstic seven days later after agreeing to a two-year deal. On 1 October 2020, he signed for Orihuela CF of the same league.

== Personal life ==
Giner's father, Fernando, was also a footballer. A central defender, he was also developed at Valencia.
