= José Carlos (footballer, born 1987) =

Spanish footballer

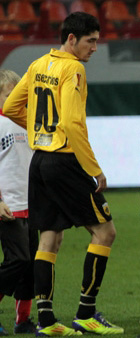
- José Carlos in action for AEK Athens in 2011

Personal information
- Full name: José Carlos Fernández Vázquez
- Date of birth: 17 July 1987 (age 39)
- Place of birth: Minas de Riotinto, Spain
- Height: 1.77 m (5 ft 10 in)
- Positions: Winger; forward

Team information
- Current team: Ríotinto

Youth career
- Ríotinto
- Recreativo
- Sevilla

Senior career*
Years	Team	Apps	(Gls)
2006–2009	Sevilla C	32	(9)
2008–2010	Sevilla B	43	(4)
2009–2011	Sevilla	18	(1)
2011	→ Cartagena (loan)	12	(0)
2011–2012	AEK Athens	27	(2)
2012–2014	Rayo Vallecano	35	(2)
2014	Córdoba	1	(0)
2015–2016	Llagostera	13	(0)
2016–2017	Gimnàstic	11	(1)
2018–2019	Castellón	13	(0)
2020–2021	Recreativo	14	(0)
2022–	Ríotinto	30	(13)
- * Club domestic league appearances and goals as of 21:24, 23 September 2024 (UTC)

José Carlos Fernández Vázquez (born 17 July 1987), known as José Carlos, is a Spanish professional footballer who plays as a left winger or a forward for Ríotinto Balompié.

== Club career ==
=== Sevilla ===
Born in Minas de Riotinto, Province of Huelva, José Carlos grew in Sevilla FC's youth system, making his first-team debut on 15 February 2009 as he played two minutes in a 2–0 away win against RCD Espanyol. He added five more the following week, in the 1–0 home victory over Atlético Madrid also in La Liga.

On 3 April 2010, as a second-half substitute, José Carlos scored his first league goal for Sevilla in their 3–0 home defeat of CD Tenerife. Previously, in that season's Copa del Rey against CF Atlético Ciudad, he had netted twice in a 5–1 home rout.

=== AEK Athens ===
With the arrival of new coach Gregorio Manzano, José Carlos fell out favour and was sent on loan to FC Cartagena in the Segunda División, until June 2011. He agreed terms with AEK Athens F.C. late into that month, signing a one-year deal with the Greek club and reuniting with his former Sevilla coach (main squad and reserves) Manuel Jiménez as well as teammate Cala.

José Carlos scored his first competitive goal for AEK against FC Dinamo Tbilisi in a UEFA Europa League qualifier, the game's only in a home fixture. He added a second in the same competition – 1–2 group stage home loss to SK Sturm Graz– as the team only earned three points in six matches.

=== Rayo Vallecano ===
In July 2012, José Carlos returned to Spain and joined Rayo Vallecano of the top division. After being regularly used in his first season, he suffered a serious knee injury which took him out of the majority of the following.

=== Córdoba ===
On 12 July 2014, José Carlos signed a one-year deal with Córdoba CF who had just promoted to the top flight. His only appearance for the side occurred on 25 October 2014, and it consisted of 18 minutes in a 1–1 home draw against Real Sociedad; a day later, he again suffered an injury.

José Carlos terminated his contract on 13 November 2014.

=== Later career ===
On 9 December 2015, after trials at Recreativo de Huelva and UE Llagostera, José Carlos signed a short-term deal with the latter club. He contributed 557 minutes during the campaign, and his team suffered relegation from the second tier.

José Carlos moved to Gimnàstic de Tarragona on 5 July 2016, on a one-year contract. He then represented CD Castellón and Recreativo (both in the Segunda División B) as well as his local club Ríotinto Balompié (Andalusia regional leagues).
