= Jean Luc Gbayara Assoubre =

Ivorian footballer (born 1992)

Jean Luc
Personal information
- Full name: Jean Luc Gbayara Assoubre
- Date of birth: 8 August 1992 (age 34)
- Place of birth: Lakota, Ivory Coast
- Height: 1.72 m (5 ft 8 in)
- Position: Winger

Team information
- Current team: Atlètic d'Escaldes
- Number: 8

Youth career
- Villarreal

Senior career*
Years	Team	Apps	(Gls)
2010–2012	Villarreal C	29	(0)
2012–2013	Villarreal B	9	(1)
2013–2018	Gimnàstic	116	(11)
2018–2019	AEK Larnaca	22	(0)
2019	→ Lamia (loan)	9	(1)
2019–2020	AEL	13	(1)
2021	Sigma Olomouc	2	(0)
2021–2022	Ethnikos Achna	10	(0)
2022	Marbella	11	(1)
2023–2025	Inter d'Escaldes	64	(3)
2026–	Atlètic d'Escaldes	20	(2)
- * Club domestic league appearances and goals as of 10 June 2026

Jean Luc Gbayara Assoubre (born 8 August 1992), known as Jean Luc, is an Ivorian professional footballer who plays as a winger for Primera Divisió club Atlètic d'Escaldes.

== Career ==
=== Villarreal ===
Born in Lakota, Ivory Coast, Jean Luc graduated from Villarreal CF's youth academy, making his senior debuts with the C-team in the 2010–11 season, in Tercera División.

On 3 March 2013, Jean Luc first appeared with the reserves, starting in a 2–1 loss at CE L'Hospitalet. He scored his first senior goal on 5 May, netting his side's last of a 2–2 draw at Yeclano Deportivo.

=== Gimnàstic ===
On 13 July 2013, Jean Luc joined Gimnàstic de Tarragona in Segunda División B. He made his debut for the club on 15 September, coming on as a late substitute in a 1–0 loss at UE Sant Andreu.

On 29 June 2015, after achieving promotion to Segunda División, Jean Luc signed a new two-year deal with the Catalans. He made his debut in the category on 23 August, starting in a 2–2 home draw against Albacete Balompié.

Jean Luc scored his first professional goal on 30 August 2015, netting the winner in a 2–1 away success over CD Tenerife.

=== AEK Larnaca ===
On 29 July 2018, free agent Jean Luc signed for Cypriot club AEK Larnaca.

On 30 January 2019 he was loaned to Lamia until the end of the season.

=== AEL ===
On 1 September 2019, he joined AEL on a free transfer. On 8 December 2019, he scored his first goal in a 1–1 away draw against Asteras Tripolis.

== Honours ==
AEK Larnaca

- Cypriot Super Cup: 2018
