= Ikechukwu Uche =

Nigerian footballer (born 1984)

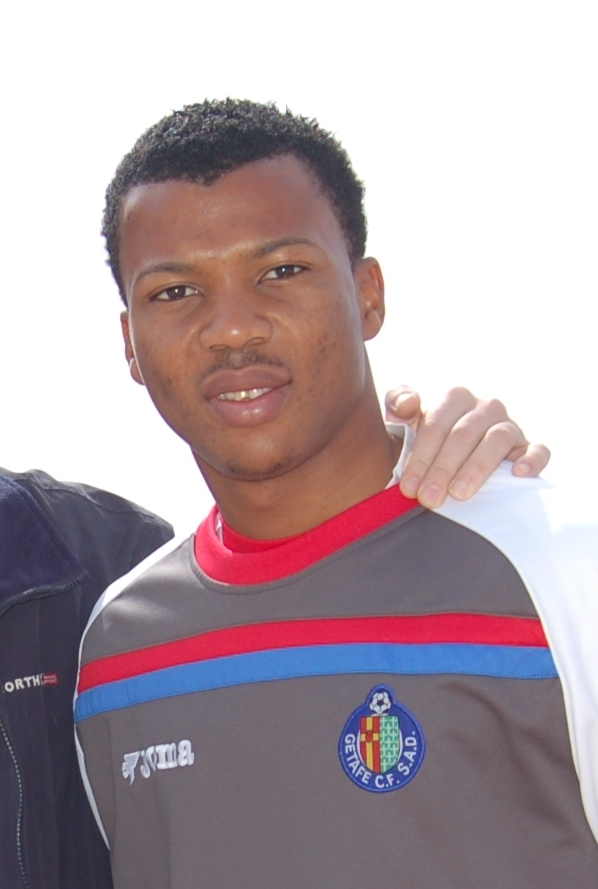
- Uche as a Getafe player

Personal information
- Date of birth: 5 January 1984 (age 42)
- Place of birth: Aba, Nigeria
- Height: 1.71 m (5 ft 7 in)
- Position: Striker

Youth career
- Amanze United
- 2000–2001: Iwuanyanwo Nationale

Senior career*
Years	Team	Apps	(Gls)
2002–2003	Racing Ferrol	28	(2)
2003–2007	Recreativo	133	(50)
2007–2009	Getafe	55	(11)
2009–2011	Zaragoza	18	(1)
2011–2015	Villarreal	85	(33)
2011–2012	→ Granada (loan)	34	(3)
2015–2016	UANL	1	(1)
2016	→ Málaga (loan)	3	(0)
2016–2019	Gimnàstic	75	(21)
Total		432	(122)

International career
2007–2014	Nigeria	46	(19)
Medal record
Men's football
Representing Nigeria
Africa Cup of Nations
Winner	2013 South Africa
- * Club domestic league appearances and goals as of 9 June 2019

Ikechukwu Uche MON (born 5 January 1984) is a Nigerian former professional footballer who played as a striker.

Known for his acrobatic goal celebrations, he spent most of his professional career in Spain, having arrived in the country before the age of 20. He amassed La Liga totals of 194 matches and 42 goals over nine seasons, representing in the competition Recreativo, Getafe, Zaragoza, Villarreal, Granada and Málaga.

Uche appeared for Nigeria in two Africa Cup of Nations.

== Club career ==
=== Early years ===
Born in Aba, Abia, Uche's career began in his country with Amanze United and Iwuanyanwu Nationale. Aged just 18,with immense financial aid from his brother,he moved to Racing de Ferrol in the Spanish second division after trialing with different Spanish lower division clubs, appearing in 24 games in his second season, which ended in relegation for the Galician team.

Uche then joined another club in the country's second level, Recreativo de Huelva, for a fee of US$300,000, and scored 12 goals in his first year, becoming the league's top scorer in the 2005–06 campaign at 20 in just 28 appearances (with five braces), as the Andalusians returned – as champions – to La Liga after a three-year absence.

In his first top flight season, Uche scored on eight occasions. Notably, he netted in three consecutive matches in November 2006 (with wins at RC Celta de Vigo and against CA Osasuna), helping Recre finish eight.

Uche joined Madrid's Getafe CF for 2007–08, mainly being used as a substitute. On 29 November 2008, also from the bench, he scored in a 3–1 home victory over Real Madrid.

=== Zaragoza ===
Real Zaragoza, recently returned to the top flight, agreed terms to sign Uche in July 2009, subject to medical. He was presented officially on the 22nd, and signed a four-year contract; in only his second match, a 1–4 loss at Sevilla FC, he suffered a severe knee injury, going on to miss seven months.

Uche recovered fully for Zaragoza's 2010–11 pre-season. However, he soon suffered another knee injury, being ruled out for another six months; his return to action took place on 19 February 2011 as he played 20 minutes in a 0–1 home defeat against Atlético Madrid, hitting David de Gea's bar in the dying minutes of the game after an individual effort.

On 2 March 2011, Uche made his first start of the season, at home against Athletic Bilbao. On the 55th minute, he scored the final 2–1 for the Aragonese – his first goal since May 2009 – and cried profusely as he celebrated.

=== Villarreal ===
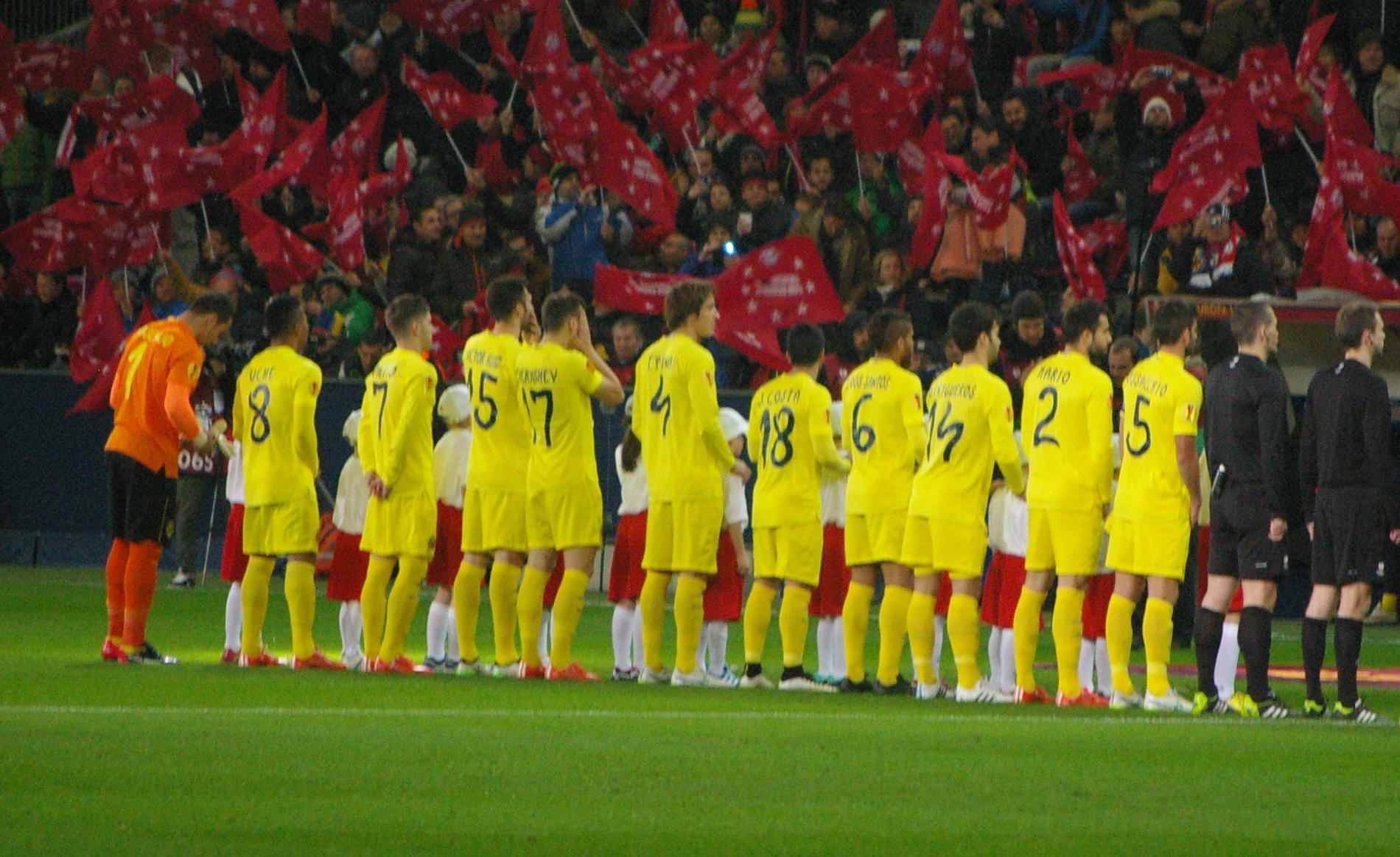
Uche (second from left) lining up for Villarreal in 2015

In the last day of the 2011 summer transfer window, Uche signed with Villarreal CF, being immediately loaned out to Granada CF. On 17 September, he scored the game's only goal against the team that held his rights, in a home fixture.

Subsequently, returned to the Yellow Submarine, Uche led his team in scoring as it returned to the top division in 2013. Highlights included braces in home wins over CD Mirandés (2–0), Sporting de Gijón (2–1), Girona FC (4–1) and at Racing de Santander (3–0). On 6 January 2014, back in the top tier, he scored his first hat-trick as a professional to help to a 5–2 away rout of Rayo Vallecano.

=== Later years ===
On 20 June 2015, Uche signed with Mexican side Tigres UANL for €3.5 million on a three-year contract. He was brought on as a substitute in the September 24, 2015 Concacaf Champions League match against Isidro Metapán, where he scored his only goal for the club to win the match and subsequently re-injuring himself. On 2 February of the following year he returned to Spain, being loaned to Málaga CF.

On 10 August 2016, Uche agreed to a one-year deal with Gimnàstic de Tarragona in the Spanish second division. Roughly one year later, he extended his contract until 2019.

== International career ==
Uche made his debut for Nigeria in 2007. He was part of the squad that competed in the 2008 Africa Cup of Nations in Ghana, helping the Super Eagles to the quarter-finals.

Uche was called up to the 23-man squad for the 2013 Africa Cup of Nations, contributing with four scoreless appearances to the eventual champions.

== Personal life ==
Uche's older brother, Kalu Uche, was also a footballer. Also a forward, he too spent most of his senior career in Spain (they are not related to two other players, Uche Okechukwu and Ikechukwu Kalu); his name, Ikechukwu, meant "God's Power" in Igbo.

Uche made a cameo appearance in the music video for Touchin Body, by J. Martins and DJ Arafat.

== Career statistics ==
Scores and results list Nigeria's goal tally first, score column indicates score after each Uche goal.

List of international goals scored by Ikechukwu Uche
No.	Date	Venue	Opponent	Score	Result	Competition
1	8 September 2007	Warri Township, Warri, Nigeria	Lesotho	2–0	2–0	2008 Africa Cup of Nations qualification
2	9 January 2008	MPFS Marbella, Estepona, Spain	Sudan	1–0	2–0	Friendly
3	1 June 2008	Abuja Stadium, Abuja, Nigeria	South Africa	1–0	2–0	2010 World Cup qualification
4	21 June 2008	Abuja Stadium, Abuja, Nigeria	Equatorial Guinea	2–0	2–0	2010 World Cup qualification
5	6 September 2008	Telkom Park, Port Elizabeth, South Africa	South Africa	1–0	1–0	2010 World Cup qualification
6	7 June 2009	Abuja Stadium, Abuja, Nigeria	Kenya	1–0	3–0	2010 World Cup qualification
7	27 March 2011	Abuja Stadium, Abuja, Nigeria	Ethiopia	3–0	4–0	2012 African Cup of Nations qualification
8	27 March 2011	Abuja Stadium, Abuja, Nigeria	Ethiopia	4–0	4–0	2012 African Cup of Nations qualification
9	29 March 2011	Abuja Stadium, Abuja, Nigeria	Kenya	3–0	3–0	Friendly
10	1 June 2011	Abuja Stadium, Abuja, Nigeria	Argentina	1–0	4–1	Friendly
11	1 June 2011	Abuja Stadium, Abuja, Nigeria	Argentina	3–0	4–1	Friendly
12	5 June 2011	Addis Ababa Stadium, Addis Ababa, Ethiopia	Ethiopia	1–0	2–2	2012 African Cup of Nations qualification
13	8 October 2011	Abuja Stadium, Abuja, Nigeria	Guinea	2–1	2–2	2012 African Cup of Nations qualification
14	15 November 2011	Ahmadu Bello, Kaduna, Nigeria	Zambia	2–0	2–0	Friendly
15	3 June 2012	U. J. Esuene, Calabar, Nigeria	Namibia	1–0	1–0	2014 World Cup qualification
16	16 June 2012	U. J. Esuene, Calabar, Nigeria	Rwanda	1–0	2–0	2013 Africa Cup of Nations qualification
17	8 September 2012	Samuel Kanyon Doe, Monrovia, Liberia	Liberia	2–1	2–2	2013 Africa Cup of Nations qualification
18	13 October 2012	U. J. Esuene, Calabar, Nigeria	Liberia	5–0	6–1	2013 Africa Cup of Nations qualification
19	15 November 2014	Stade Municipal (Pointe-Noire), Congo	Congo	1–0	2–0	2015 Africa Cup of Nations qualification

== Honours ==
Recreativo

- Segunda División: 2005–06

Nigeria

- Africa Cup of Nations: 2013

Individual

- Pichichi Trophy (Segunda División): 2005–06

Orders

- Member of the Order of the Niger
