= Elvir Maloku =

Albanian professional footballer (born 1996)

Personal information
- Full name: Elvir Mehdi Maloku
- Date of birth: 14 May 1996 (age 30)
- Place of birth: Rijeka, Croatia
- Height: 1.76 m (5 ft 9 in)
- Position: Winger

Team information
- Current team: Cres
- Number: 11

Youth career
- 2004–2007: Lokomotiva Rijeka
- 2007–2011: Stari Grad Rijeka
- 2008–2010: → Mune (loan)
- 2010–2011: → Klana (loan)
- 2012–2013: Rijeka
- 2013–2014: Hajduk Split

Senior career*
Years	Team	Apps	(Gls)
2013–2016	Hajduk Split	48	(4)
2016–2019	Gimnàstic	3	(0)
2017–2018	→ AEK Larnaca (loan)	19	(1)
2018–2019	→ Aluminij (loan)	16	(1)
2019–2020	Olimpia Grudziądz	21	(1)
2021	Dečić	8	(0)
2021–2022	Opatija	12	(0)
2022–2023	PAEEK	15	(3)
2024	VfR Mannheim	21	(2)
2024–2025	BSV Schwarz-Weiß Rehden	23	(1)
2025	Bilogora 91	1	(0)
2025–	Cres	11	(2)

International career
2013	Croatia U17	5	(0)
2013–2014	Croatia U18	3	(0)
2014	Croatia U19	4	(1)
2017	Albania U21	3	(0)
- * Club domestic league appearances and goals as of 19:43, 4 January 2026 (CET)

Elvir Mehdi Maloku (born 14 May 1996) is an Albanian professional footballer who plays as a winger for the Croatian fifth-tier club NK Cres.

== Club career ==
=== Early career ===
Born in Rijeka into an ethnic Albanian family, Maloku passed through various clubs in his native region where he had started his career with NK Lokomotiva Rijeka in 2004 and moved in 2007 to NK Stari Grad Rijeka, before moving to the youth setup of the local Prva HNL side HNK Rijeka in early 2012. In the 2012–13 season, he was the top scorer of the club's under-17 team, scoring 13 goals in 26 appearances. In February 2013, Maloku had a successful trial at Italian giants Juventus FC but talks over potential signing were ultimately called off.

=== Hajduk Split ===
In the summer of 2013, Maloku moved to HNK Hajduk Split along with his younger brother Trojan. He made his first team debut on 28 August 2013 in his team's 3–1 away win against NK Lokomotiva Zagreb, coming in the 83rd minute for Anton Maglica.

During his first two seasons under coach Igor Tudor, Maloku was used mostly as a bench player. His pace would sometimes prove good in the last minutes of the game. When Damir Burić took over the club in 2015, Maloku made his way into the first lineup but after some bad performances, he was benched again and used as a substitute. Out of his 69 total caps for Hajduk, he made it only 13 times in the starting lineup and was used 35 times as a substitute. In only 4 matches during his Hajduk career, he managed to play the entire game for 90 minutes. After the end of the season, he was released by Hajduk and given the option to search for his new club.

=== Gimnàstic ===
On 18 July 2016, Maloku signed a four-year contract with Spanish Segunda División club Gimnàstic de Tarragona. Then on 7 January, after being rarely used in the league, he was loaned to AEK Larnaca until June 2018.

On 23 August 2018, he was loaned out to NK Aluminij for the rest of the season.

=== Olimpia Grudziądz ===
In September 2019, Maloku signed with Polish side Olimpia Grudziądz. His contract with the club was terminated on August 1, 2020.

=== Dečić Tuzi ===
Maloku spent the first part of the 2020–21 season without a club, before signing for FK Dečić in Montenegro.

=== Opatija ===
In June 2021, Maloku was presented as a new NK Opatija player in June 2021.

== International career ==
=== Croatia ===
Maloku was a Croatian youth international, playing for the under-17 team in the 2013 FIFA U-17 World Cup in the summer of 2013 and several matches for the under-19 team and the under-21 team.

=== Albania ===
He was eligible to play for Albania at international level due to his parents origin. He accepted the invitation from head coach Skënder Gega to play for Albania national under-21 football team in 2015, later stating that he intends to play for Albania at senior level should a chance arise. He was called up for the friendly matches against Kazakhstan and Sweden on 12 and 16 June 2015 respectively, but his appearance for the team was thwarted by club duties with Hajduk Split.

Following arrival of Alban Bushi as a head coach of Albania U21, Maloku was re-invited to Albania U21. In a press conference later, Bushi stated that Maloku would be given the Albanian citizenship to make him eligible for Albania U21 in the 2019 UEFA European Under-21 Championship qualification. Maloku was given the Albanian citizenship by president Bujar Nishani.

==== 2019 UEFA European Under-21 Championship qualification ====
Maloku was called up for the friendly match against France U21 on 5 June 2017 and the 2019 UEFA European Under-21 Championship qualification opening match against Estonia U21 on 12 June 2017. On 7 June 2017, FIFA granted Maloku clearance to start for Albania U21 in competitive matches. However, a day before the opening match of the qualifiers against Estonia U21, Maloku suffered a late injury which made him miss the match.

== Career statistics ==
=== Club ===
As of 5 November 2017

Appearances and goals by club, season and competition
Club	Season	League			Cup		Europe (Note: Includes UEFA Champions League and UEFA Europa League.)		Other		Total	
Club	Season	Division	Apps	Goals	Apps	Goals	Apps	Goals	Apps	Goals	Apps	Goals
Hajduk Split	2013–14	1. HNL	11	0	2	1	—		—		13	1
Hajduk Split	2014–15	1. HNL	15	2	3	1	3	0	—		21	3
Hajduk Split	2015–16	1. HNL	22	2	5	1	8	0	—		35	3
Hajduk Split	Total		48	4	10	3	11	0	—		69	7
Gimnàstic de Tarragona	2016–17	Segunda División	3	0	3	1	—		—		6	1
AEK Larnaca	2016–17	Cypriot First Division	14	0	2	0	—		—		16	0
AEK Larnaca	2017–18	Cypriot First Division	2	0	—		2	0	—		4	0
AEK Larnaca	Total		16	0	2	0	2	0	—		20	0
Career total			67	4	15	4	13	0	—		95	8

== Honours ==
Hajduk Split

- Croatian Super Cup runner-up: 2013

AEK Larnaca

- Cypriot First Division runner-up: 2016–17
- Cypriot Cup: 2017–18
