= 2017–18 Gimnàstic de Tarragona season =

Gimnàstic de Tarragona
2017–18 season
- President: Josep María Andreu
- Manager: José Antonio Gordillo
- Segunda División: 15th
- Copa del Rey: First round
- Copa Catalunya (friendly): Semifinals
- Top goalscorer: League: Manu Barreiro (10); All: Manu Barreiro (11)
Home colours	Away colours

The 2017–18 Gimnàstic de Tarragona's season is the 131st season in the club's existence and the third consecutive in Segunda División.

== Players ==
=== Squad ===
As of 19 June 2018

No.	Name	Position	Nat.	Place of birth	Date of birth (age)	Club caps	Club goals	Int. caps	Int. goals	Signed from	Date signed	Fee	Contract End
Goalkeepers
1	Stole Dimitrievski	GK	(North Macedonia)	Kumanovo	25 December 1993 (aged 24)	39	0	18	0	Granada	16 August 2016	Free	30 June 2020
31	Bernabé Barragán	GK	(Spain) (Andalusia)	Los Palacios	18 February 1993 (aged 25)	2	0	–	–	Atlético Madrid	20 July 2017	Free	30 June 2020
33	José Perales	GK	(Spain) (Balearic Islands)	Palma	25 May 1993 (aged 25)	3	0	–	–	Pobla	31 July 2016	Free	30 June 2020
Defenders
2	Oto Kakabadze	RB	(Georgia (country))	Tbilisi	27 July 1995 (aged 22)	45	1	16	0	Dinamo Tbilisi (Georgia (country))	7 July 2016	Undisc.	30 June 2019
3	Javi Jiménez	LB	(Spain) (Andalusia)	Quesada	11 January 1996 (aged 22)	30	0	–	–	Málaga B	30 July 2017	Free	30 June 2020
4	Xavi Molina (c)	CB/DM	(Spain) (Catalonia)	La Canonja	19 July 1986 (aged 31)	174	9	–	–	Atlético Baleares	13 June 2013	Free	30 June 2018
16	Julio Pleguezuelo	CB	(Spain) (Balearic Islands)	Palma	26 January 1997 (aged 21)	10	0	–	–	Arsenal (England)	31 January 2018	Loan	30 June 2018
18	Daisuke Suzuki	CB	(Japan)	Tokyo	29 January 1990 (aged 26)	72	1	2	0	Kashiwa Reysol (Japan)	16 February 2016	Free	30 June 2018
22	Abraham Minero	LB/LW	(Spain) (Catalonia)	Granollers	22 February 1986 (aged 32)	30	0	–	–	Zaragoza	6 July 2017	Free	30 June 2019
24	Mohammed Djetei	CB	(Cameroon)	Yaoundé	18 August 1994 (aged 23)	11	0	6	0	Union Douala (Cameroon)	4 July 2016	Undisc.	30 June 2020
25	César Arzo	CB	(Spain) (Valencian Community)	Villarreal	21 January 1986 (aged 32)	10	0	–	–	Kairat (Kazakhstan)	27 December 2017	Free	30 June 2018
32	Roger Figueras	CB	(Spain) (Catalonia)	Valls	5 April 1997 (aged 21)	–	–	–	–	Pobla	29 July 2017	Free	30 June 2019
35	Pol Valentín	RB	(Spain) (Catalonia)	Avinyonet	21 February 1997 (aged 21)	1	0	–	–	Pobla	29 July 2017	Free	30 June 2020
36	Iván de Nova	LB/CB	(Spain) (Catalonia)	Tarragona	22 September 1996 (aged 21)	–	–	–	–	Pobla	29 July 2017	Free	30 June 2019
Midfielders
5	Jon Gaztañaga	DM/CB	(Spain) (Basque Country (autonomous community))	Andoain	28 June 1991 (aged 26)	28	0	–	–	Real Sociedad	22 August 2017	Free	30 June 2020
6	Nicolao Dumitru	LW	(Italy)	Nacka (Sweden)	12 October 1991 (aged 26)	10	1	–	–	Alcorcón	11 January 2018	Free	30 June 2020
7	Fali	DM/CM	(Spain) (Valencian Community)	Valencia	12 August 1993 (aged 24)	22	1	–	–	Huracán	6 July 2015	Free	30 June 2020
9	Javi Márquez	CM	(Spain) (Catalonia)	Barcelona	11 May 1986 (aged 32)	13	0	–	–	NY Cosmos (United States)	8 January 2018	Free	30 June 2020
10	Juan Muñiz	AM/LW/RW	(Spain) (Asturias)	Gijón	14 March 1992 (aged 26)	66	6	–	–	Sporting Gijón	8 January 2016	Free	30 June 2018
12	Jean Luc	RW	(Ivory Coast)	Lakota	8 August 1992 (aged 25)	116	11	–	–	Villarreal B	13 July 2013	Free	30 June 2018
14	Maikel Mesa	CM/AM	(Spain) (Canary Islands)	Tenerife	4 June 1991 (aged 26)	36	8	–	–	Mirandés	29 June 2017	Free	30 June 2019
17	Javier Matilla	CM	(Spain) (Castilla–La Mancha)	Quero	16 August 1988 (aged 29)	10	0	–	–	Free agent	29 December 2017	Free	30 June 2018
20	Tete Morente	LW/RW	(Spain) (Andalusia)	La Línea	4 December 1996 (aged 21)	26	2	–	–	Atlético Baleares	9 July 2017	Free	30 June 2021
21	Omar Perdomo	RW/LW	(Spain) (Canary Islands)	Las Palmas	3 July 1993 (aged 24)	17	2	–	–	Tenerife	13 July 2017	Loan	30 June 2018
23	Sergio Tejera	CM/AM	(Spain) (Catalonia)	Barcelona	28 May 1990 (aged 28)	101	7	–	–	Espanyol	8 July 2015	Free	30 June 2020
26	Rayco Rodríguez	AM	(Spain) (Canary Islands)	Las Palmas	24 November 1996 (aged 21)	1	0	–	–	Pobla	30 November 2016	Free	30 June 2018
29	Brugui	LW/SS	(Spain) (Catalonia)	Bàscara	4 November 1996 (aged 21)	3	0	–	–	Pobla	31 August 2017	Free	30 June 2018
30	Pol Prats	RW	(Spain) (Catalonia)	Paüls	1999 (age 26–27)	–	–	–	–	Pobla	3 March 2018	Free	Undisclosed
Forwards
8	Ike Uche	ST	(Nigeria)	Aba	5 January 1984 (aged 34)	48	16	46	19	Tigres UANL (Mexico)	10 August 2016	Free	30 June 2019
11	Manu Barreiro	ST	(Spain) (Galicia (Spain))	Compostela	8 July 1986 (aged 31)	59	16	–	–	Alavés	22 December 2016	Free	30 June 2018
15	Álvaro Vázquez	ST	(Spain) (Catalonia)	Barcelona	27 April 1991 (aged 27)	18	6	–	–	Espanyol	11 January 2018	Loan	30 June 2018
19	Jean Marie Dongou	ST	(Cameroon)	Douala	20 April 1995 (aged 23)	8	0	–	–	Zaragoza	23 August 2017	Free	30 June 2021

== Transfers ==
=== In ===
No.	Pos.	Nat.	Name	Age	EU	Moving from	Type	Transfer window	Ends	Transfer fee	Source
25	DF	(Georgia (country))	Oto Kakabadze	22	Non-EU	Esbjerg fB (Denmark)	Loan return	Summer	2019	Free	
28	MF	(Spain)	Carlos García	23	EU	Atlético Sanluqueño	Loan return	Summer	2018	Free	
14	MF	(Spain)	Maikel Mesa	26	EU	Mirandés	Transfer	Summer	2019	Free	Gimnàstic
22	DF	(Spain)	Abraham Minero	31	EU	Zaragoza	Transfer	Summer	2019	Free	Gimnàstic
20	MF	(Spain)	Tete Morente	20	EU	Atlético Baleares	Transfer	Summer	2021	Free	Gimnàstic
27	DF	(Spain)	Carlos Blanco	21	EU	Juventus (Italy)	Transfer	Summer	2019	Free	Gimnàstic
30	MF	(Italy)	Sandro Toscano	21	EU	Badalona	Transfer	Summer	2019	Undisclosed	Gimnàstic
21	MF	(Spain)	Omar Perdomo	24	EU	Tenerife	Loan	Summer	2018	Free	Gimnàstic
33	GK	(Spain)	José Perales	24	EU	Pobla de Mafumet	Promoted	Summer	2018	Free	Diari de Tarragona
31	GK	(Spain)	Bernabé Barragán	24	EU	Atlético Madrid	Transfer	Summer	2019	Free	Gimnàstic
17	MF	(Spain)	Álvaro Bustos	22	EU	Sporting Gijón	Transfer	Summer	2021	Free	Gimnàstic
35	DF	(Spain)	Pol Valentín	20	EU	Pobla de Mafumet	Promoted	Summer	2018	Free	Diari de Tarragona
3	DF	(Spain)	Javi Jiménez	21	EU	Atlético Malagueño	Transfer	Summer	2020	Free	Gimnàstic
—	DF	(Spain)	Juanmi Carrión	19	EU	Sevilla C	Transfer	Summer	2021	Free	Gimnàstic
5	DF	(Spain)	Jon Gaztañaga	26	EU	Real Sociedad	Transfer	Summer	2020	Free	Gimnàstic
19	FW	(Cameroon)	Jean Marie Dongou	22	EU	Zaragoza	Transfer	Summer	2021	Free	Gimnàstic
25	MF	(Azerbaijan)	Eddy Silvestre	25	EU	Cádiz	Transfer	Summer	2020	Free	Diario AS
25	DF	(Spain)	César Arzo	31	EU	Kairat (Kazakhstan)	Transfer	Winter	2018	Free	Gimnàstic
17	MF	(Spain)	Javier Matilla	31	EU	Free agent	Transfer	Winter	2018	Free	Diario AS
9	MF	(Spain)	Javi Márquez	31	EU	New York Cosmos (United States)	Transfer	Winter	2020	Free	Gimnàstic
6	MF	(Italy)	Nicolao Dumitru	26	EU	Alcorcón	Transfer	Winter	2020	Free	Gimnàstic
15	FW	(Spain)	Álvaro Vázquez	26	EU	Espanyol	Loan	Winter	2018	Free	Gimnàstic
7	MF	(Spain)	Fali	24	EU	Barcelona B	Loan return	Winter	2020	Free	Gimnàstic
16	DF	(Spain)	Julio Pleguezuelo	21	EU	Arsenal (England)	Loan	Winter	2018	Free	Gimnàstic

Total spending: ▼€0

=== Out ===
No.	Pos.	Nat.	Name	Age	EU	Moving to	Type	Transfer window	Transfer fee	Source
5	DF	(Spain)	Iago Bouzón	34	EU	Free agent	Contract ended	Summer	Free	Gimnàstic
6	MF	(Spain)	Manolo Martínez	37	EU	Free agent	Retired	Summer	Free	Gimnàstic
7	MF	(Spain)	José Carlos	29	EU	Free agent	Contract ended	Summer	Free	Gimnàstic
8	MF	(Gabon)	Lévy Madinda	25	EU	Celta de Vigo	Loan return	Summer	Free	Gimnàstic
17	MF	(Spain)	Luismi	25	EU	Valladolid	Loan return	Summer	Free	Gimnàstic
20	MF	(Spain)	Miguel Ángel Cordero	29	EU	Cartagena	Contract ended	Summer	Free	Gimnàstic
20	MF	(Spain)	Ferrán Giner	28	EU	Free agent	Contract ended	Summer	Free	Gimnàstic
25	MF	(Cameroon)	Achille Emaná	35	EU	Free agent	Contract ended	Summer	Free	Gimnàstic
—	DF	(Spain)	Moussa Bandeh	25	EU	Lleida Esportiu	Contract ended	Summer	Free	Gimnàstic
9	MF	(Spain)	Cristian Lobato	28	EU	Sporting Kansas City (United States)	Transfer	Summer	Undisclosed	Gimnàstic
1	GK	(Spain)	Manolo Reina	32	EU	Mallorca	Contract rescinded	Summer	Free	Gimnàstic
11	FW	(Spain)	Álex López	23	EU	Mallorca	Transfer	Summer	Undisclosed	Gimnàstic
2	DF	(Spain)	Gerard Valentín	23	EU	Deportivo La Coruña	Transfer	Summer	€600K	Gimnàstic
37	DF	(Spain)	Ruxi	22	EU	Rápido de Bouzas	Loan	Summer	Free	Gimnàstic
3	DF	(Spain)	Mossa	28	EU	Oviedo	Transfer	Summer	Undisclosed	Gimnàstic
—	DF	(Spain)	Juanmi Carrión	19	EU	Linense	Loan	Summer	Free	Gimnàstic
28	MF	(Spain)	Carlos García	23	EU	UD Logroñés	Loan	Summer	Free	Gimnàstic
17	MF	(Spain)	Álvaro Bustos	22	EU	Mallorca	Transfer	Winter	Undisclosed	Gimnàstic
6	MF	(France)	Wilfried Zahibo	24	EU	New England Revolution (United States)	Contract rescinded	Winter	Free	Gimnàstic
15	DF	(Spain)	Carlos Blanco	21	EU	Betis B	Loan	Winter	Free	Gimnàstic
30	MF	(Italy)	Sandro Toscano	22	EU	Melilla	Loan	Winter	Free	Gimnàstic
9	FW	(Cameroon)	Stephane Emaná	23	EU	Atlético Madrid B	Loan	Winter	Free	Gimnàstic
25	MF	(Azerbaijan)	Eddy Silvestre	25	EU	Alcorcón	Contract rescinded	Winter	Free	Gimnàstic
28	MF	(Spain)	Carlos García	24	EU	Jumilla	Loan	Winter	Free	Gimnàstic
7	MF	(Chile)	Juan Delgado	24	Non-EU	Tondela (Portugal)	Loan	Winter	Free	Gimnàstic
16	DF	(Brazil)	Bruno Perone	30	EU	Zaragoza	Contract rescinded	Winter	Free	Gimnàstic

Total gaining: ▲€600,000

Balance

Total: ▲€600,000

=== Contracts ===
No.	Pos.	Nat.	Name	Age	Status	Contract length	Expiry date	Source
35	DF	(Spain)	Pol Valentín	20	Signed	3 years	June 2020	Gimnàstic
33	GK	(Spain)	José Perales	24	Signed	3 years	June 2020	Gimnàstic
32	DF	(Spain)	Roger Figueras	20	Signed	2 years	June 2019	Gimnàstic
36	DF	(Spain)	Iván de Nova	20	Signed	2 years	June 2019	Gimnàstic
1	GK	(North Macedonia)	Stole Dimitrievski	23	Signed	3 years	June 2020	Gimnàstic
8	FW	(Nigeria)	Ike Uche	33	Signed	2 years	June 2019	Gimnàstic

== Managers ==
Name	Nat.	Place of birth	Date of birth (age)	Signed from	Date signed	Role	Departure	Manner	Contract End
Lluís Carreras	(Spain) (Catalonia)	Sant Pol de Mar	24 September 1972 (aged 45)	Free agent	21 June 2017	Permanent	9 September 2017	Sacked	30 June 2019
Rodri	(Spain) (Catalonia)	Barcelona	28 January 1971 (aged 47)	Pobla	9 September 2017	Permanent	29 January 2018	Sacked	30 June 2018
Nano Rivas	(Spain) (Castilla–La Mancha)	Ciudad Real	7 July 1980 (aged 37)	Free agent	29 January 2018	Permanent	13 May 2018	Sacked	30 June 2018
José Antonio Gordillo	(Spain) (Andalusia)	Morón de la Frontera	24 January 1974 (aged 44)	Levante	14 May 2018	Permanent			30 June 2018

== Player statistics ==
=== Squad statistics ===
As of 19 June 2018

No.	Pos	Nat	Player	Total		Segunda División		Copa del Rey	
No.	Pos	Nat	Player	Apps	Goals	Apps	Goals	Apps	Goals
1	GK	(North Macedonia) MKD	Stole Dimitrievski	39	0	39	0	0	0
2	DF	(Georgia (country)) GEO	Oto Kakabadze	36	1	36	1	0	0
3	DF	(Spain) ESP	Javi Jiménez	30	0	26+3	0	1	0
4	DF	(Spain) ESP	Xavi Molina	39	1	38	1	0+1	0
5	DF	(Spain) ESP	Jon Gaztañaga	28	0	24+3	0	1	0
6	MF	(Italy) ITA	Nicolao Dumitru	10	1	2+8	1	0	0
7	MF	(Spain) ESP	Fali	14	0	12+2	0	0	0
8	FW	(Nigeria) NGR	Ike Uche	24	8	14+10	8	0	0
9	MF	(Spain) ESP	Javi Márquez	13	0	8+5	0	0	0
10	MF	(Spain) ESP	Juan Muñiz	24	0	12+11	0	1	0
11	FW	(Spain) ESP	Manu Barreiro	40	11	32+7	10	1	1
12	MF	(Ivory Coast) CIV	Jean Luc	17	1	11+6	1	0	0
14	MF	(Spain) ESP	Maikel Mesa	36	8	32+4	8	0	0
15	FW	(Spain) ESP	Álvaro Vázquez	18	6	13+5	6	0	0
16	DF	(Spain) ESP	Julio Pleguezuelo	10	0	10	0	0	0
17	MF	(Spain) ESP	Javier Matilla	10	0	5+5	0	0	0
18	DF	(Japan) JPN	Daisuke Suzuki	21	0	20	0	1	0
19	FW	(Cameroon) CMR	Jean Marie Dongou	8	0	0+8	0	0	0
20	MF	(Spain) ESP	Tete Morente	26	2	18+7	2	1	0
21	MF	(Spain) ESP	Omar Perdomo	17	2	7+9	2	0+1	0
22	DF	(Spain) ESP	Abraham Minero	30	0	26+4	0	0	0
23	MF	(Spain) ESP	Sergio Tejera	26	1	23+3	1	0	0
24	DF	(Cameroon) CMR	Mohammed Djetei	0	0	0	0	0	0
25	DF	(Spain) ESP	César Arzo	10	0	9+1	0	0	0
26	MF	(Spain) ESP	Rayco Rodríguez	0	0	0	0	0	0
29	FW	(Spain) ESP	Brugui	3	0	0+3	0	0	0
30	MF	(Spain) ESP	Pol Prats	0	0	0	0	0	0
31	GK	(Spain) ESP	Bernabé Barragán	2	0	2	0	0	0
32	DF	(Spain) ESP	Roger Figueras	0	0	0	0	0	0
33	GK	(Spain) ESP	José Perales	3	0	1+1	0	1	0
35	DF	(Spain) ESP	Pol Valentín	1	0	1	0	0	0
36	DF	(Spain) ESP	Iván de Nova	0	0	0	0	0	0
Players on loan to other clubs:
7	MF	(Chile) CHI	Juan Delgado	18	1	13+4	1	1	0
9	FW	(Cameroon) CMR	Stephane Emaná	5	0	1+3	0	0+1	0
15	DF	(Spain) ESP	Carlos Blanco	5	0	4	0	1	0
16	FW	(Albania) ALB	Elvir Maloku	0	0	0	0	0	0
28	MF	(Spain) ESP	Carlos García	0	0	0	0	0	0
30	MF	(Italy) ITA	Sandro Toscano	0	0	0	0	0	0
—	GK	(Spain) ESP	Alberto Varo	0	0	0	0	0	0
—	DF	(Spain) ESP	Juanmi Carrión	0	0	0	0	0	0
—	DF	(Spain) ESP	Ruxi	0	0	0	0	0	0
Players who have left the club after the start of the season:
6	MF	(France) FRA	Wilfried Zahibo	7	0	4+2	0	1	0
16	DF	(Brazil) BRA	Bruno Perone	16	0	13+2	0	1	0
17	MF	(Spain) ESP	Álvaro Bustos	4	0	0+4	0	0	0
25	MF	(Azerbaijan) AZE	Eddy Silvestre	11	0	6+5	0	0	0

=== Top scorers ===
Place	Number	Position	Nation	Name	Segunda División	Copa del Rey	Total
1	11	FW	(Spain)	Manu Barreiro	10	1	11
2	8	FW	(Nigeria)	Ike Uche	8	0	8
2	14	MF	(Spain)	Maikel Mesa	8	0	8
3	15	FW	(Spain)	Álvaro Vázquez	6	0	6
4	20	MF	(Spain)	Tete Morente	2	0	2
4	21	MF	(Spain)	Omar Perdomo	2	0	2
5	2	DF	(Georgia (country))	Oto Kakabadze	1	0	1
5	4	DF	(Spain)	Xavi Molina	1	0	1
5	6	MF	(Italy)	Nicolao Dumitru	1	0	1
5	7	MF	(Chile)	Juan Delgado	1	0	1
5	10	MF	(Spain)	Juan Muñiz	1	0	1
5	12	MF	(Ivory Coast)	Jean Luc	1	0	1
5	23	MF	(Spain)	Sergio Tejera	1	0	1
TOTALS					43	1	44

=== Disciplinary record ===
Number	Nation	Position	Name	Segunda División		Copa del Rey		Total	
Number	Nation	Position	Name	Yellow card	Red card	Yellow card	Red card	Yellow card	Red card
22	(Spain)	DF	Abraham Minero	13	1	0	0	13	1
4	(Spain)	DF	Xavi Molina	12	0	0	0	12	0
23	(Spain)	MF	Sergio Tejera	12	0	0	0	12	0
10	(Spain)	MF	Juan Muñiz	9	0	1	0	10	0
2	(Georgia (country))	DF	Oto Kakabadze	8	0	0	0	8	0
3	(Spain)	DF	Javi Jiménez	7	0	0	0	7	0
14	(Spain)	MF	Maikel Mesa	7	0	0	0	7	0
5	(Spain)	DF	Jon Gaztañaga	6	0	1	0	7	0
18	(Japan)	DF	Daisuke Suzuki	6	1	0	0	6	1
20	(Spain)	MF	Tete Morente	6	0	0	0	6	0
15	(Spain)	FW	Álvaro Vázquez	4	1	0	0	4	1
25	(Spain)	DF	César Arzo	4	1	0	0	4	1
7	(Spain)	MF	Fali	4	0	0	0	4	0
9	(Spain)	MF	Javi Márquez	4	0	0	0	4	0
11	(Spain)	FW	Manu Barreiro	4	0	0	0	4	0
16	(Spain)	DF	Julio Pleguezuelo	4	0	0	0	4	0
17	(Spain)	MF	Javier Matilla	4	0	0	0	4	0
1	(North Macedonia)	GK	Stole Dimitrievski	3	0	0	0	3	0
6	(France)	MF	Wilfried Zahibo	3	0	0	0	3	0
12	(Ivory Coast)	MF	Jean Luc	3	0	0	0	3	0
25	(Azerbaijan)	MF	Eddy Silvestre	2	0	0	0	2	0
8	(Nigeria)	FW	Ike Uche	2	0	0	0	2	0
7	(Chile)	MF	Juan Delgado	1	0	0	0	1	0
16	(Brazil)	DF	Bruno Perone	1	0	0	0	1	0
31	(Spain)	GK	Bernabé Barragán	1	0	0	0	1	0
33	(Spain)	GK	José Perales	1	0	0	0	1	0
TOTALS				131	4	2	0	133	4

== Competitions ==
=== Pre-season/Friendlies ===
22 July 2017	Gimnàstic	2–0	Villarreal	Tarragona
	Omar 12'; Emaná 75'	Report	(yellow card) 29' Soriano; (yellow card) 50' Víctor Ruiz	Stadium: Nou Estadi; Attendance: 2,983

28 July 2017	Olot	0–5	Gimnàstic	Olot
	Uri Santos (yellow card) 75'	Report	10' Emaná; 77' Brugui; 83' 90' Barreiro; 84' De Nova	Stadium: Municipal; Attendance: 692; Referee: Miguel Ángel Moreno Villaécija

1 August 2017	CE Farners	0–5	Gimnàstic	Sant Julià del Llor i Bonmatí
		Report	52' Carlos García; 74' 80' Emaná; 82' 85' Delgado	Stadium: Municipal de Llor i Bonmatí; Referee: Ester Parramon Monerris

4 August 2017	Gimnàstic	1–1	Barcelona	Tarragona
	Barreiro 11'; Zahibo (yellow card) 85'; Muñiz (yellow card) 90'	Report	78' Alcácer	Stadium: Nou Estadi; Attendance: 11,928; Referee: Santiago Varón Aceitón

9 August 2017 Ciutat de Tarragona Trophy	Gimnàstic	2–1	Zaragoza	Tarragona
	Maikel 40' 56'	Report	50' Iglesias; (red card) 83' Leto	Stadium: Nou Estadi; Attendance: 3,028; Referee: Guillermo Cuadra Fernández

12 August 2017	Castellón	2–0	Gimnàstic	Castellón de la Plana
	Arturo (yellow card) 35'; Luismi (yellow card) 40'; Cubillas 65'; Fonte 90'	Report		Stadium: Castàlia; Referee: Rafael Bueno Miralles

=== Copa Catalunya ===
25 October 2017 4th round	Vilafranca	1–1 (1–3 p)	Gimnàstic	Vilafranca del Penedès
20:30	Ton 10'	Report	(yellow card) 58' Zahibo; 68' Iván Vidal	Stadium: Municipal; Referee: Carlos Albelda Barcena
	Penalties
	(penalty missed) (penalty scored); (penalty missed) Boira (penalty missed)		(penalty scored) Rayco; (penalty scored) Jean Luc; (penalty scored) Brugui

15 November 2017 Semifinals	Cornellà	3–1	Gimnàstic	Cornellà de Llobregat
20:15	Gallego 33'; Ricard 60'; Édgar 72'	Report	37' Muñiz	Stadium: Nou Camp Municipal; Referee: Rubén Mancera Antón

=== Segunda División ===
Pos	Team	Pld	W	D	L	GF	GA	GD	Pts
13	Alcorcón	42	12	16	14	37	42	−5	52 (Note: Alcorcón finished ahead of Reus and Gimnàstic on head-to-head points: Alcorcón 10 pts, Reus 5 pts, Gimnàstic 1 pt)
14	Reus	42	12	16	14	31	42	−11	52
15	Gimnàstic	42	15	7	20	44	50	−6	52
16	Córdoba	42	15	6	21	57	65	−8	51
17	Albacete	42	11	16	15	35	46	−11	49

Source: La Liga
Rules for classification: 1) points; 2) head-to-head points; 3) head-to-head goal difference; 4) goal difference; 5) number of goals scored

==== Results summary ====
Overall								Home						Away					
Pld	W	D	L	GF	GA	GD	Pts	W	D	L	GF	GA	GD	W	D	L	GF	GA	GD
42	15	7	20	44	50	−6	52	7	3	11	22	29	−7	8	4	9	22	21	+1

Last updated: 19 June 2018.
Source: Competitive matches

==== Results by round ====
Round	1	2	3	4	5	6	7	8	9	10	11	12	13	14	15	16	17	18	19	20	21	22	23	24	25	26	27	28	29	30	31	32	33	34	35	36	37	38	39	40	41	42
Ground	H	A	H	A	H	A	H	A	H	A	H	A	A	H	A	H	A	H	A	H	A	A	H	A	H	A	H	A	H	A	H	A	H	H	A	H	A	H	A	H	A	H
Result	L	D	L	L	W	D	D	L	W	W	L	L	W	L	W	L	W	W	L	L	W	D	L	L	D	W	L	D	L	W	L	L	W	W	L	D	L	L	L	W	W	W
Position	20	19	22	22	20	20	21	21	20	17	18	19	16	18	15	15	17	15	18	18	17	12	14	17	18	15	18	18	18	17	17	18	16	14	16	16	15	18	18	17	15	15

Updated to match(es) played on 19 June 2018. Source:
A = Away; H = Home; W = Win; D = Draw; L = Loss

==== Matches ====
20 August 2017 1	Gimnàstic	0–1	Almería	Tarragona
20:30	Tejera (yellow card) 82'; Maikel (yellow card) 84'		30' Caballero; (yellow card) 79' Pozo	Stadium: Nou Estadi; Attendance: 4,978; Referee: Óliver de la Fuente Ramos

27 August 2017 2	Reus	1–1	Gimnàstic	Reus
20:30	Luís Gustavo 23'; Vaz (yellow card) 78'		(yellow card) 45' Suzuki; 58' Maikel; (yellow card) 90+1' Muñiz; (yellow card) 90+3' Molina	Stadium: Municipal; Attendance: 4,235; Referee: Guillermo Cuadra Fernández

2 September 2017 3	Gimnàstic	0–4	Sporting Gijón	Tarragona
18:00	Uche (yellow card) 57'; Perales (yellow card) 62'		8' (o.g.) Molina; 15' Šćepović; (yellow card) 33' Lora; 45+2' Rubén García; (yellow card) 48' Mariño; 63' (pen.) Santos; (yellow card) 84' Carmona	Stadium: Nou Estadi; Attendance: 5,373; Referee: Adrián Cordero Vega

8 September 2017 4	Cádiz	2–0	Gimnàstic	Cádiz
21:00	Brian (yellow card) 18'; Barral 54'; Álvaro García 73'		(yellow card) 56' Suzuki; (yellow card) 63' Javi Jiménez	Stadium: Ramón de Carranza; Attendance: 13,492; Referee: Eduardo Prieto Iglesias

17 September 2017 5	Gimnàstic	3–1	Albacete	Tarragona
18:00	Omar 11'; Delgado 20'; Tejera (yellow card) 45+1'; Uche 90+1'; Tete (yellow card) 90+5'	Report	25' (yellow card) 75' Zozulya; (yellow card) 43' Héctor; (yellow card) 64' Bela; (yellow card) 78' De la Hoz	Stadium: Nou Estadi; Attendance: 4,746; Referee: Juan Luis Pulido Santana

24 September 2017 6	Zaragoza	1–1	Gimnàstic	Zaragoza
20:30	Toquero 19'; Eguaras (yellow card) 26'; Iglesias (yellow card) 33' (yellow-red card) 45'; Febas (yellow card) 36'; Álvarez (yellow card) 60'	Report	(yellow card) 8' Molina; (yellow card) 26' Abraham; (yellow card) 56' Gaztañaga; (yellow card) 71' Kakabadze; (yellow card) 76' Javi Jiménez; 87' (yellow card) 87' Maikel; (yellow card) 90+3' Muñiz	Stadium: La Romareda; Attendance: 17,026; Referee: Jorge Figueroa Vázquez

1 October 2017 7	Gimnàstic	P – P	Barcelona B	Tarragona
20:30		Report		Stadium: Nou Estadi
Note: Postponed due to the political events in Catalonia

7 October 2017 8	Tenerife	2–0	Gimnàstic	Santa Cruz de Tenerife
20:00	Tyronne (yellow card) 18'; Malbašić 64' (pen.) 72'; Aveldaño (yellow card) 68'; Cámara (yellow card) 88'	Report	(yellow card) 33' (yellow-red card) 86' Suzuki; (yellow card) 63' Bernabé; (yellow card) 73' Molina; (yellow card) 84' Javi Jiménez; (yellow card) 90+3' Tete	Stadium: Heliodoro Rodríguez López; Attendance: 12,557; Referee: Isidro Díaz de Mera Escuderos

11 October 2017 9	Gimnàstic	2–0	Granada	Tarragona
20:00	Uche 27' 31'; Abraham (yellow card) 55'; Eddy (yellow card) 84'	Report	(yellow card) 79' Machís; (yellow card) 80' Alberto; (yellow card) 90' Saunier	Stadium: Nou Estadi; Attendance: 5,212; Referee: Álvaro Moreno Aragón

15 October 2017 10	Córdoba	1–5	Gimnàstic	Córdoba
21:00	Guardiola 19' (yellow card) 39'; Ramos (yellow card) 46'; Kieszek (yellow card) 77'; Fernández (yellow card) 89'	Report	1' 15' Uche; (yellow card) 31' Gaztañaga; (yellow card) 60' Dimitrievski; (yellow card) 74' Delgado; 79' Tejera; 82' 90+3' (pen.) Barreiro	Stadium: Nuevo Arcángel; Attendance: 9,672; Referee: David Pérez Pallas

22 October 2017 11	Gimnàstic	0–3	Alcorcón	Tarragona
19:00	Abraham (yellow card) 84' (yellow-red card) 87'	Report	20' Peña; (yellow card) 26' Hugo Álvarez; (yellow card) 31' Álvaro Giménez; 45+2' Dorca; 62' Dumitru	Stadium: Nou Estadi; Attendance: 5,021; Referee: Rubén Eiriz Mata

28 October 2017 12	Lugo	1–0	Gimnàstic	Lugo
17:00	Campillo 26'; Miquel (yellow card) 42'; Herrera (yellow card) 57'; Bernardo (yellow card) 90'	Report	(yellow card) 16' Gaztañaga; (yellow card) 78' Jean Luc	Stadium: Anxo Carro; Attendance: 3,450; Referee: Jorge Valdés Aller

1 November 2017 7	Gimnàstic	0–0	Barcelona B	Tarragona
18:00	Abraham (yellow card) 35'; Gaztañaga (yellow card) 53'	Report	(yellow card) 42' Sarsanedas; (yellow card) 52' Fali	Stadium: Nou Estadi; Attendance: 6,822; Referee: Santiago Varón Aceitón

5 November 2017 13	Valladolid	0–3	Gimnàstic	Valladolid
18:00	Toni (yellow card) 21'	Report	9' (yellow card) 14' (goal) 63' Maikel; (yellow card) 27' Molina; 52' Jean Luc; (yellow card) 77' Zahibo	Stadium: José Zorrilla; Attendance: 9,654; Referee: Aitor Gorostegui Fernández Ortega

12 November 2017 14	Gimnàstic	1–2	Oviedo	Tarragona
16:00	Barreiro 40' (pen.); Gaztañaga (yellow card) 59'; Suzuki (yellow card) 90+2'; Dimitrievski (yellow card) 90+5'	Report	(yellow card) 9' Saúl; (yellow card) 27' (goal) 72' (red card) 89' Carlos Hernández; (yellow card) 39' Mossa; (yellow card) 41' Linares; 90+4' (pen.) Aarón	Stadium: Nou Estadi; Attendance: 5,927; Referee: Valentín Pizarro Gómez

19 November 2017 15	Numancia	1–2	Gimnàstic	Soria
12:00	Barreiro 6' (o.g.); Etxeberría (yellow card) 70'	Report	2' Barreiro; (yellow card) 21' Zahibo; (yellow card) 28' Kakabadze; (yellow card) 32' Abraham; 87' Uche	Stadium: Los Pajaritos; Attendance: 3,163; Referee: José Antonio López Toca

25 November 2017 16	Gimnàstic	0–2	Lorca	Tarragona
18:00	Gaztañaga (yellow card) 56'; Barreiro (yellow card) 75'; Zahibo (yellow card) 84'; Kakabadze (yellow card) 90'	Report	60' (yellow card) 72' Apeh; (yellow card) 74' (goal) 85' Abel Gómez; (yellow card) 76' Bustos	Stadium: Nou Estadi; Attendance: 4,454; Referee: Jorge Figueroa Vázquez

1 December 2017 17	Osasuna	P – P	Gimnàstic	Pamplona
				Stadium: El Sadar
Note: Postponed due to heavy snow

10 December 2017 18	Gimnàstic	2–1	Sevilla Atlético	Tarragona
18:00	Maikel 11'; Perone (yellow card) 21'; Molina 37'	Report	(yellow card) 45' Amo; (yellow card) 55' (goal) 76' Carlos Fernández; (yellow card) 90+3' Curro	Stadium: Nou Estadi; Attendance: 4,941; Referee: Eduardo Prieto Iglesias

17 December 2017 19	Cultural Leonesa	2–0	Gimnàstic	León
18:00	Iza (yellow card) 45' (goal) 72'; Yeray (yellow card) 56'; Iván González 64'	Report	(yellow card) 65' Kakabadze; (yellow card) 84' Molina	Stadium: Reino de León; Attendance: 6,833; Referee: Víctor Areces Franco

23 December 2017 20	Gimnàstic	1–2	Huesca	Tarragona
16:00	Jean Luc (yellow card) 41'; Eddy (yellow card) 52'; Maikel 90+4'	Report	(yellow card) 13' Sastre; 37' Ávila; (yellow card) 68' Melero; (yellow card) 72' Brežančić; 79' Jair	Stadium: Nou Estadi; Attendance: 4,527; Referee: Aitor Gorostegui Fernández Ortega

6 January 2018 21	Rayo Vallecano	2–3	Gimnàstic	Madrid
18:00	De Tomás (penalty missed) 37' (yellow card) 62'; Embarba 23'; Velázquez (yellow card) 29'; Trejo 89'	Report	4' (yellow card) 88' Maikel; (yellow card) 18' Kakabadze; 33' 90+4' Barreiro; (yellow card) 36' Muñiz; (yellow card) 83' Dimitrievski; (yellow card) 87' Matilla; (yellow card) 90' Abraham	Stadium: Campo de Fútbol de Vallecas; Attendance: 6,285; Referee: Adrián Cordero Vega

13 January 2018 22	Almería	1–1	Gimnàstic	Almería
18:00	Navas (yellow card) 42'; Fidel 59'; Fran (yellow card) 80'; Verza (yellow card) 86' (penalty missed) 90+1'	Report	(yellow card) 73' Muñiz; 79' (o.g.) Joaquín	Stadium: Juegos Mediterráneos; Attendance: 6,154; Referee: Valentín Pizarro Gómez

18 January 2018 17	Osasuna	0–2	Gimnàstic	Pamplona
19:00	Lillo (yellow card) 25'	Report	(yellow card) 21' Abraham; 30' Barreiro; (yellow card) 45+2' Tete; (yellow card) 90' Matilla; 90+1' Vázquez	Stadium: El Sadar; Attendance: 12,254; Referee: Luis Mario Milla Alvendiz

21 January 2018 23	Gimnàstic	1–2	Reus	Tarragona
18:00	Molina (yellow card) 62'; Javi Jiménez (yellow card) 68'; Vázquez 73'	Report	(yellow card) 29' Atienza; 39' Juan Domínguez; (yellow card) 57' Carbonell; (yellow card) 68' Haro; 84' Vítor Silva; (yellow card) 85' Máyor; (yellow card) 90' Olmo	Stadium: Nou Estadi; Attendance: 9,596; Referee: Oliver de la Fuente Ramos

28 January 2018 24	Sporting Gijón	2–0	Gimnàstic	Gijón
16:00	Santos 45+2'; Rubén García 65'	Report	(yellow card) 18' Suzuki; (yellow card) 20' Barreiro; (yellow card) 24' Muñiz; (yellow card) 54' Molina	Stadium: El Molinón; Attendance: 21,122; Referee: Saúl Ais Reig

3 February 2018 25	Gimnàstic	0–0	Cádiz	Tarragona
16:00	Kakabadze (yellow card) 6'; Márquez (yellow card) 28'; Abraham (yellow card) 86'; Fali (yellow card) 90'	Report	(yellow card) 33' Abdullah; (yellow card) 45' Eugeni	Stadium: Nou Estadi; Attendance: 5,299; Referee: Jorge Valdés Aller

11 February 2018 26	Albacete	0–1	Gimnàstic	Albacete
12:00	Zozulya (yellow card) 16'; Chus Herrero (yellow card) 55'; Saveljich (yellow card) 77'	Report	(yellow card) 12' Pleguezuelo; (yellow card) 42' Maikel; 44' Vázquez; (yellow card) 78' Molina; (yellow card) 82' Fali; (yellow card) 90+5' Tejera	Stadium: Carlos Belmonte; Attendance: 6,417; Referee: Iñaki Bikandi Garrido

17 February 2018 27	Gimnàstic	0–2	Zaragoza	Tarragona
20:30	Márquez (yellow card) 64'	Report	(yellow card) 33' Zapater; 41' Grippo; (yellow card) 45+3' Álvarez; (yellow card) 51' Pombo; 60' Iglesias; (yellow card) 86' Vinícius Araújo; (yellow card) 90' Benito	Stadium: Nou Estadi; Attendance: 5,617; Referee: David Pérez Pallas

24 February 2018 28	Barcelona B	1–1	Gimnàstic	Barcelona
16:00	Cardona 77'		(yellow card) 38' Tejera; (yellow card) 43' Muñiz; 65' Kakabadze; (yellow card) 89' Molina	Stadium: Mini Estadi; Attendance: 3,678; Referee: Jorge Figueroa Vázquez

4 March 2018 29	Gimnàstic	1–2	Tenerife	Tarragona
16:00	Tete 10'; Abraham (yellow card) 43'; Barreiro (yellow card) 51'; Pleguezuelo (yellow card) 65'; Tejera (yellow card) 68'		12' 30' Villar; (yellow card) 85' Sanz; (yellow card) 87' Carlos Ruiz	Stadium: Nou Estadi; Attendance: 3,939; Referee: Víctor Areces Franco

10 March 2018 30	Granada	0–1	Gimnàstic	Granada
16:00	Kunde (yellow card) 86'		(yellow card) 20' Pleguezuelo; 36' Omar; (yellow card) 42' Tete; (yellow card) 83' Kakabadze; (yellow card) 86' Abraham; (yellow card) 86' Vázquez	Stadium: Los Cármenes; Attendance: 8,493; Referee: Juan Luis Pulido Santana

18 March 2018 31	Gimnàstic	0–2	Córdoba	Tarragona
18:00	Márquez (yellow card) 14'; Arzo (yellow card) 24'; Fali (yellow card) 45+2'; Tejera (yellow card) 76'; Pleguezuelo (yellow card) 87'		26' Aythami; (yellow card) 61' Quintanilla; (yellow card) 62' (yellow-red card) 90+3' Galán; 86' (yellow card) 87' Guardiola; (yellow card) 90+2' Kieszek	Stadium: Nou Estadi; Attendance: 5,897; Referee: Isidro Díaz de Mera

25 March 2018 32	Alcorcón	1–0	Gimnàstic	Alcorcón
12:00	Dorca 5'; Asdrúbal (yellow card) 75'; David Fernández (yellow card) 82'		(yellow card) 16' Abraham; (yellow card) 39' Barreiro; (yellow card) 51' Tejera	Stadium: Santo Domingo; Attendance: 2,250; Referee: Oliver de la Fuente Ramos

1 April 2018 33	Gimnàstic	3–0	Lugo	Tarragona
20:00	Maikel 15'; Tejera (yellow card) 69'; Tete (yellow card) 71' (goal) 90+5'; Vázquez (yellow card) 72'; Muñiz 75'		(yellow card) 67' Pita; (yellow card) 72' Kravets	Stadium: Nou Estadi; Attendance: 5,211; Referee: Jorge Figueroa Vázquez

8 April 2018 34	Gimnàstic	1–0	Valladolid	Tarragona
12:00	Fali (yellow card) 56'; Arzo (yellow card) 61'; Molina (yellow card) 69'; Vázquez 89'; Tejera (yellow card) 90+4'		(yellow card) 21' Antoñito; (yellow card) 28' Luismi; (yellow card) 62' Ontiveros; (yellow card) 81' Gianniotas; (yellow card) 90+4' Míchel	Stadium: Nou Estadi; Attendance: 5,145; Referee: Dámaso Arcediano Monescillo

15 April 2018 35	Oviedo	1–0	Gimnàstic	Oviedo
20:00	Mariga (yellow card) 24'; Berjón 36' (yellow card) 78'; Carlos Hernández (yellow card) 68'; Christian (yellow card) 82'		(yellow card) 9' Suzuki; (yellow card) 54' Javi Jiménez; (yellow card) 58' Tete; (yellow card) 70' (yellow-red card) 89' Arzo; (yellow card) 75' Maikel; (yellow card) 79' Muñiz; (yellow card) 90+3' Vázquez	Stadium: Carlos Tartiere; Attendance: 15,741; Referee: Eduardo Prieto Iglesias

21 April 2018 36	Gimnàstic	0–0	Numancia	Tarragona
16:00	Muñiz (yellow card) 3'; Abraham (yellow card) 9'; Vázquez (yellow card) 45'		(yellow card) 21' Pablo Valcarce; (yellow card) 35' Grego; (yellow card) 74' Larrea	Stadium: Nou Estadi; Attendance: 5,391; Referee: Gorka Sagues Oscoz

29 April 2018 37	Lorca	1–0	Gimnàstic	Lorca
20:00	Pomares (yellow card) 40'; Ojeda 49'; Antonio López (yellow card) 64'; Apeh (yellow card) 69'; Muñoz (yellow card) 90'		(yellow card) 31' Abraham; (yellow card) 64' Tejera; (yellow card) 86' Molina; (red card) 90+3' Vázquez; (yellow card) 90+3' Muñiz	Stadium: Francisco Artés Carrasco; Attendance: 2,125; Referee: Santiago Varón Aceitón

6 May 2018 38	Gimnàstic	0–2	Osasuna	Tarragona
12:00	Javi Jiménez (yellow card) 42'; Arzo (yellow card) 60'		(yellow card) 20' Lillo; 31' Rober; 43' Xisco; (yellow card) 81' Coris	Stadium: Nou Estadi; Attendance: 5,627; Referee: Guillermo Cuadra Fernández

13 May 2018 39	Sevilla Atlético	1–0	Gimnàstic	Seville
18:00	Lara 66'		(yellow card) 86' Matilla	Stadium: Viejo Nervión; Attendance: 732; Referee: Victor Areces Franco

19 May 2018 40	Gimnàstic	5–3	Cultural Leonesa	Tarragona
16:00	Jean Luc (yellow card) 26'; Maikel (yellow card) 36'; Kakabadze (yellow card) 51'; Vázquez 54'; Barreiro 56' 75'; Márquez (yellow card) 60'; Uche 72' (yellow card) 87'; Dumitru 84'; Javi Jiménez (yellow card) 84'; Tejera (yellow card) 90'		7' (yellow card) 66' Martínez; 17' (yellow card) 58' Emi; (yellow card) 36' (yellow-red card) 81' Iván González; 90+3' Señé	Stadium: Nou Estadi; Attendance: 7,763; Referee: Iñaki Bikandi Garrido

27 May 2018 41	Huesca	0–1	Gimnàstic	Huesca
20:30	Sastre (yellow card) 42'; Remiro (yellow card) 69'; Pulido (yellow card) 73'; Akapo (red card) 83'		(yellow card) 11' Molina; 72' Uche; (yellow card) 73' Matilla; (yellow card) 89' Tejera	Stadium: El Alcoraz; Attendance: 5,282; Referee: Gorka Sagues Oscoz

2 June 2018 42	Gimnàstic	2–0	Rayo Vallecano	Tarragona
20:30	Vázquez 12'; Barreiro 31'		(yellow card) 14' Comesaña; (yellow card) 45+1' (yellow-red card) 68' Domínguez	Stadium: Nou Estadi; Attendance: 11,133; Referee: Saúl Ais Reig

=== Copa del Rey ===
5 September 2017 1st round	Gimnàstic	1–1 (1–3 p)	Lugo	Tarragona
18:45	Barreiro 5'; Muñiz (yellow card) 32'; Gaztañaga (yellow card) 100'		20' Donoso; (yellow card) 57' Escriche; (yellow card) 120' Luis Díaz	Stadium: Nou Estadi; Referee: Santiago Varón Aceitón
	Penalties
	Barreiro (penalty scored); Omar (penalty missed); Perone (penalty missed); Javi Jiménez (penalty missed)		(penalty scored) Sergio Gil; (penalty scored) Fydriszewski; (penalty scored) Sergio Díaz
