= List of Spanish football transfers winter 2017–18 =

This is a list of Spanish football transfers for the winter sale in 2017–18 season of La Liga and Segunda División. Only moves from La Liga and Segunda División are listed.

The winter transfer window opened on 1 January 2018, although a few transfers took place prior to that date. The window closed at midnight on 31 January 2018. Players without a club can join one at any time, either during or in between transfer windows. Clubs below La Liga level can also sign players on loan at any time. If need be, clubs can sign a goalkeeper on an emergency loan, if all others are unavailable.

== Winter 2017–18 transfer window ==
Date	Name	Moving from	Moving to	Fee
22 November 2017	(France) Karim Yoda	(Spain) Getafe	(Spain) Reus	Loan
4 December 2017	(Spain) Rubén Miño	(Cyprus) AEK Larnaca	(Spain) Albacete	Free
4 December 2017	(Chile) Fabián Orellana	(Spain) Valencia	(Spain) Eibar	Loan
7 December 2017	(Spain) Ignasi Miquel	(Spain) Lugo	(Spain) Málaga	€450K
9 December 2017	(Spain) Alejandro Arribas	(Spain) Deportivo La Coruña	(Mexico) UNAM	€1.5M
12 December 2017	(Spain) Nauzet Alemán	(Spain) Almería	Retired	
22 December 2017	(Spain) David Navarro	(Spain) Alcorcón	Retired	
30 December 2017	(Portugal) André Moreira	(Portugal) Braga	(Spain) Atlético Madrid	Loan return
30 December 2017	(Portugal) André Moreira	(Spain) Atlético Madrid	(Portugal) Belenenses	Loan
30 December 2017	(Spain) Francisco Sandaza	(Qatar) Al Ahli	(Spain) Girona	Loan return
31 December 2017	(Spain) Rubén Castro	(China) Guizhou Zhicheng	(Spain) Real Betis	Loan return
31 December 2017	(Chile) Felipe Gutiérrez	(Brazil) Internacional	(Spain) Real Betis	Loan return
31 December 2017	(Colombia) Adrián Ramos	(Spain) Granada	(China) Chongqing Lifan	Loan return
31 December 2017	(Paraguay) Óscar Romero	(Spain) Alavés	(China) Shanghai Shenhua	Loan return
31 December 2017	(Turkey) Enes Ünal	(Spain) Levante	(Spain) Villarreal	Loan return
31 December 2017	(Spain) Vitolo	(Spain) Las Palmas	(Spain) Atlético Madrid	Loan return
1 January 2018	(Brazil) Guilherme Arana	(Brazil) Corinthians	(Spain) Sevilla	€11M
1 January 2018	(Spain) César Arzo	(Kazakhstan) Kairat	(Spain) Gimnàstic	Free
1 January 2018	(Argentina) Emanuel Cecchini	(Spain) Málaga	(Mexico) León	Loan
1 January 2018	(Spain) Chuli	(Spain) Getafe	(Spain) Lugo	Loan
1 January 2018	(Spain) Coke	(Germany) Schalke 04	(Spain) Levante	Loan
1 January 2018	(Spain) Diego Costa	(England) Chelsea	(Spain) Atlético Madrid	€65M
1 January 2018	(Senegal) Papakouli Diop	(Spain) Espanyol	(Spain) Eibar	Free
1 January 2018	(France) Enzo Fernández	(Spain) Alavés	(Switzerland) Lausanne-Sport	Free
1 January 2018	(Spain) José Fran	(Spain) Albacete	(Spain) Hércules	Free
1 January 2018	(Spain) Álex Gálvez	(Spain) Eibar	(Spain) Las Palmas	Loan
1 January 2018	(Chile) Manuel Iturra	(Mexico) Necaxa	(Spain) Málaga	Free
1 January 2018	(Spain) Josan	(Spain) Albacete	(Spain) Elche	Free
1 January 2018	(Spain) Javier Matilla	Unattached	(Spain) Gimnàstic	Free
1 January 2018	(Argentina) Walter Montoya	(Spain) Sevilla	(Mexico) Cruz Azul	€5.5M
1 January 2018	(Portugal) Thierry Moutinho	(Romania) CFR Cluj	(Spain) Cultural Leonesa	Loan
1 January 2018	(Argentina) Gabriel Peñalba	(Mexico) Cruz Azul	(Spain) Las Palmas	Free
1 January 2018	(Spain) Jairo Samperio	(Germany) Mainz 05	(Spain) Las Palmas	€350K
1 January 2018	(Spain) Sito	(Spain) Lorca	(Spain) Valencia B	Loan return
1 January 2018	(Mexico) Carlos Vela	(Spain) Real Sociedad	(United States) Los Angeles FC	€5M
2 January 2018	(Paraguay) Javier Acuña	(Thailand) Ratchaburi Mitr Phol	(Spain) Albacete	Free
2 January 2018	(Spain) Erik Morán	(Spain) Leganés	(Greece) AEK Athens	€130K
2 January 2018	(Spain) Christopher Ramos	(Spain) San Fernando	(Spain) Valladolid	Undisclosed
3 January 2018	(Netherlands) Ouasim Bouy	(Spain) Cultural Leonesa	(England) Leeds United	Loan return
3 January 2018	(Spain) Álvaro Bustos	(Spain) Gimnàstic	(Spain) Mallorca	Free
3 January 2018	(Spain) Robert Ibáñez	(Spain) Valencia	(Spain) Getafe	Free
3 January 2018	(Spain) Robert Ibáñez	(Spain) Getafe	(Spain) Osasuna	Loan
3 January 2018	(Ghana) Owusu Kwabena	(Spain) Oviedo	(Spain) Leganés	Loan return
3 January 2018	(Ghana) Owusu Kwabena	(Spain) Leganés	(Spain) Cartagena	Loan
4 January 2018	(Spain) Ángel García	(Spain) Valladolid	(Spain) Cultural Leonesa	Undisclosed
4 January 2018	(Japan) Yosuke Ideguchi	(England) Leeds United	(Spain) Cultural Leonesa	Loan
4 January 2018	(Argentina) Luciano Vietto	(Spain) Atlético Madrid	(Spain) Valencia	Loan
5 January 2018	(Slovakia) Róbert Mazáň	(Slovakia) Žilina	(Spain) Celta Vigo	Undisclosed
6 January 2018	(Mali) Aly Mallé	(Italy) Udinese	(Spain) Lorca	Loan
7 January 2018	(Colombia) Roger Martínez	(China) Jiangsu Suning	(Spain) Villarreal	Loan
8 January 2018	(Brazil) Philippe Coutinho	(England) Liverpool	(Spain) Barcelona	€160M
8 January 2018	(Spain) Saúl García	(Spain) Deportivo La Coruña	(Spain) Numancia	Loan
8 January 2018	(Sweden) John Guidetti	(Spain) Celta Vigo	(Spain) Alavés	Loan
8 January 2018	(Spain) Javi Márquez	(United States) New York Cosmos	(Spain) Gimnàstic	Free
9 January 2018	(Spain) Alberto Bueno	(Portugal) Porto	(Spain) Málaga	Loan
9 January 2018	(Spain) Eugeni Valderrama	(Spain) Lorca	(Spain) Valencia B	Loan return
9 January 2018	(Spain) Eugeni Valderrama	(Spain) Valencia B	(Spain) Cádiz	Loan
9 January 2018	(Spain) Jaume Valens	(Spain) Lorca	(Spain) Jumilla	Loan
10 January 2018	(France) Paul Baysse	(Spain) Málaga	(France) Bordeaux	€1M
10 January 2018	(France) Didier Digard	Unattached	(Spain) Lorca	Free
10 January 2018	(Ivory Coast) Mamadou Koné	(Spain) Leganés	(Belgium) Eupen	Loan
10 January 2018	(Spain) Borja Lasso	(Spain) Sevilla	(Spain) Osasuna	Loan
10 January 2018	(Spain) Álvaro Lemos	(France) Lens	(Spain) Celta Vigo	Loan return
10 January 2018	(Spain) Álvaro Lemos	(Spain) Celta Vigo	(Spain) Lugo	Loan
10 January 2018	(Spain) Sergio Marcos	(Spain) Valladolid	(Spain) Cultural Leonesa	Free
10 January 2018	(Argentina) Cristian Nasuti	(Argentina) Olimpo	(Spain) Lorca	Free
11 January 2018	(Spain) Carlos Blanco	(Spain) Gimnàstic	(Spain) Real Betis B	Loan
11 January 2018	(France) Francis Coquelin	(England) Arsenal	(Spain) Valencia	€14.2M
11 January 2018	(Italy) Nicolao Dumitru	(Spain) Alcorcón	(Spain) Gimnàstic	Free
11 January 2018	(Argentina) Mateo García	(Spain) Osasuna	(Spain) Las Palmas	Loan return
11 January 2018	(Argentina) Mateo García	(Spain) Las Palmas	(Spain) Alcorcón	Loan
11 January 2018	(Colombia) Yerry Mina	(Brazil) Palmeiras	(Spain) Barcelona	€11.8M
11 January 2018	(Spain) Cristian Rivera	(Spain) Eibar	(Spain) Barcelona B	Loan
11 January 2018	(Spain) Álvaro Vázquez	(Spain) Espanyol	(Spain) Gimnàstic	Loan
11 January 2018	(France) Wilfried Zahibo	(Spain) Gimnàstic	(United States) New England Revolution	Free
12 January 2018	(Spain) Julen Colinas	(Spain) Cultural Leonesa	(Spain) UCAM Murcia	Free
12 January 2018	(Spain) Jony	(Spain) Málaga	(Spain) Sporting Gijón	Loan
12 January 2018	(Portugal) João Meira	(United States) Chicago Fire	(Spain) Lorca	Free
12 January 2018	(Paraguay) Hernán Pérez	(Spain) Espanyol	(Spain) Alavés	Loan
13 January 2018	(Argentina) Nicolás Gorosito	(Spain) Getafe	(Spain) Albacete	Free
13 January 2018	(Turkey) Arda Turan	(Spain) Barcelona	(Turkey) İstanbul Başakşehir	Loan
14 January 2018	(Argentina) Matías Defederico	(Ecuador) Universidad Católica	(Spain) Lorca	Undisclosed
14 January 2018	(Australia) Mitchell Langerak	(Spain) Levante	(Japan) Nagoya Grampus	€1.5M
14 January 2018	(Italy) Sandro Toscano	(Spain) Gimnàstic	(Spain) Melilla	Loan
15 January 2018	(Uruguay) Leandro Cabrera	(Italy) Crotone	(Spain) Getafe	Loan
15 January 2018	(Spain) Rubén Cruz	(Spain) Cádiz	(Spain) Cartagena	Free
15 January 2018	(Colombia) Marlos Moreno	(Spain) Girona	(England) Manchester City	Loan return
16 January 2018	(Costa Rica) Danny Carvajal	(Spain) Albacete	(Japan) Tokushima Vortis	Loan
16 January 2018	(Argentina) Fabián Espíndola	(Spain) Albacete	Unattached	Free
16 January 2018	(Cameroon) Martin Hongla	(Spain) Granada	(Spain) Barcelona B	Loan
16 January 2018	(Spain) Molo	(Spain) Lorca	(Spain) Murcia	Free
16 January 2018	(Spain) Pablo Vázquez	(Spain) Granada B	(Spain) Alcorcón	Loan
17 January 2018	(Spain) Jesús Alfaro	(Spain) Barcelona B	(Spain) Zaragoza	Free
17 January 2018	(Democratic Republic of the Congo) Cédric Bakambu	(Spain) Villarreal	Unattached	Free
17 January 2018	(Spain) Gorka Elustondo	(Colombia) Atlético Nacional	(Spain) Rayo Vallecano	Free
17 January 2018	(Spain) David García	(Spain) Osasuna	(Spain) Cultural Leonesa	Loan
17 January 2018	(Spain) Jaime Romero	(Spain) Córdoba	(Spain) Lugo	Loan
18 January 2018	(Spain) Cristian Bustos	(Spain) Lugo	(Spain) UCAM Murcia	Free
18 January 2018	(Spain) Ariday Cabrera	(Spain) Cultural Leonesa	(Spain) Mallorca	€10.2K
18 January 2018	(Cameroon) Stephane Emaná	(Spain) Gimnàstic	(Spain) Atlético Madrid B	Loan
18 January 2018	(Angola) Anderson Emanuel	(Spain) Rápido Bouzas	(Spain) Alavés	Undisclosed
18 January 2018	(Angola) Anderson Emanuel	(Spain) Alavés	(Croatia) Rudeš	Loan
18 January 2018	(Spain) Santi Luque	(Spain) Recreativo	(Spain) Lorca	Loan return
18 January 2018	(Spain) Yelko Pino	(Spain) Cultural Leonesa	(Spain) Lugo	Loan return
18 January 2018	(Spain) Yelko Pino	(Spain) Lugo	(Spain) Ponferradina	Loan
19 January 2018	(Algeria) Rachid Aït-Atmane	(Spain) Sporting Gijón	(Belgium) Waasland-Beveren	Loan
19 January 2018	(Algeria) Farid Boulaya	(Spain) Girona	(France) Metz	Loan
19 January 2018	(Spain) Aitor Buñuel	(Spain) Osasuna	(Spain) Valencia B	Loan
19 January 2018	(Spain) Moisés Delgado	(Spain) Barcelona B	Unattached	Free
19 January 2018	(Spain) Carlos Martínez	(Spain) Lorca	(Spain) Murcia	Free
19 January 2018	(Spain) Borja Lázaro	(Spain) Alcorcón	(Spain) Racing Santander	Loan
19 January 2018	(Spain) Luis Milla	(Spain) Fuenlabrada	(Spain) Tenerife	€513K
19 January 2018	(Spain) Daniel Pinillos	(Spain) Córdoba	(England) Barnsley	Undisclosed
20 January 2018	(Spain) Eneko Bóveda	(Spain) Athletic Bilbao	(Spain) Deportivo La Coruña	Free
20 January 2018	(Ukraine) Maksym Koval	(Ukraine) Dynamo Kyiv	(Spain) Deportivo La Coruña	Loan
20 January 2018	(Spain) Asdrúbal Padrón	(Australia) Central Coast Mariners	(Spain) Alcorcón	Free
20 January 2018	(Italy) Edoardo Soleri	(Italy) Roma	(Spain) Almería	Loan
21 January 2018	(Saudi Arabia) Salem Al-Dawsari	(Saudi Arabia) Al-Hilal	(Spain) Villarreal	Loan
21 January 2018	(Saudi Arabia) Abdullah Al-Hamdan	(Saudi Arabia) Al-Shabab	(Spain) Sporting Gijón	Loan
21 January 2018	(Saudi Arabia) Nooh Al-Mousa	(Saudi Arabia) Al-Fateh	(Spain) Valladolid	Loan
21 January 2018	(Saudi Arabia) Abdulmajeed Al-Sulayhem	(Saudi Arabia) Al-Shabab	(Spain) Rayo Vallecano	Loan
21 January 2018	(Saudi Arabia) Fahad Al-Muwallad	(Saudi Arabia) Al-Ittihad	(Spain) Levante	Loan
22 January 2018	(Saudi Arabia) Yahya Al-Shehri	(Saudi Arabia) Al-Nassr	(Spain) Leganés	Loan
22 January 2018	(Uruguay) Mauricio Lemos	(Spain) Las Palmas	(Italy) Sassuolo	Loan
22 January 2018	(Brazil) Rafinha	(Spain) Barcelona	(Italy) Internazionale	Loan
23 January 2018	(Colombia) Olmes García	(Colombia) América de Cali	(Spain) Oviedo	Loan
23 January 2018	(The Gambia) Alasana Manneh	(Spain) Sabadell	(Spain) Barcelona B	Loan return
23 January 2018	(The Gambia) Alasana Manneh	(Spain) Barcelona B	(Bulgaria) Etar	Loan
24 January 2018	(Belgium) Théo Bongonda	(Turkey) Trabzonspor	(Spain) Celta Vigo	Loan return
24 January 2018	(Spain) Carlos Caballero	(Spain) Córdoba	(Spain) Fuenlabrada	Free
24 January 2018	(Spain) Adrián Gómez	(Spain) Albacete	(Kazakhstan) Irtysh Pavlodar	Loan
24 January 2018	(Argentina) Javier Mascherano	(Spain) Barcelona	Hebei China Fortune	€5.7M
24 January 2018	(Spain) Nili	(Spain) Albacete	(Greece) Platanias	Free
24 January 2018	(Spain) Fausto Tienza	(Spain) Osasuna	(Spain) Cádiz	Free
25 January 2018	(Spain) Samuel García	(Spain) Levante	(Spain) Málaga	Loan
25 January 2018	(Spain) Nacho Gil	(Spain) Valencia	(Spain) Las Palmas	Loan
25 January 2018	(Spain) Borja Herrera	(Spain) Las Palmas	(Spain) Valladolid	Loan
25 January 2018	(Spain) Manu	(Spain) Cultural Leonesa	(Spain) Elche	Free
25 January 2018	(Honduras) Jona Mejía	(Spain) Córdoba	(Spain) Cádiz	Loan
25 January 2018	(Canada) Ballou Tabla	(Canada) Montreal Impact	(Spain) Barcelona B	Undisclosed
25 January 2018	(Spain) Iván Villar	(Spain) Celta Vigo	(Spain) Levante	Loan
26 January 2018	(Belgium) Théo Bongonda	(Turkey) Trabzonspor	(Spain) Celta Vigo	Loan return
26 January 2018	(Belgium) Théo Bongonda	(Spain) Celta Vigo	(Belgium) Zulte-Waregem	Loan
26 January 2018	(Spain) Moi Gómez	(Spain) Sporting Gijón	(Spain) Huesca	Loan
26 January 2018	(The Gambia) Sulayman Marreh	(Spain) Valladolid	(England) Watford	Loan return
26 January 2018	(The Gambia) Sulayman Marreh	(England) Watford	(Spain) Almería	Loan
26 January 2018	(Spain) Alberto Quiles	(Spain) UCAM Murcia	(Spain) Córdoba	Loan return
26 January 2018	(Equatorial Guinea) Iván Salvador	(Spain) Valladolid	(Spain) Cultural Leonesa	Loan
26 January 2018	(Spain) Roberto Santamaría	(Spain) Reus	(Spain) Huesca	Loan
26 January 2018	(Spain) Hernán Santana	(Spain) Las Palmas	(Spain) Sporting Gijón	Free
27 January 2018	(Uruguay) Matías Aguirregaray	(Mexico) Tijuana	(Spain) Las Palmas	Loan
28 January 2018	(France) Loïc Rémy	(Spain) Las Palmas	(Spain) Getafe	Loan
29 January 2018	(Argentina) Emiliano Armenteros	(Mexico) Santos Laguna	(Spain) Rayo Vallecano	Free
29 January 2018	(Spain) Gerard Deulofeu	(Spain) Barcelona	(England) Watford	Loan
29 January 2018	(Azerbaijan) Eddy	(Spain) Gimnàstic	(Spain) Alcorcón	Free
29 January 2018	(Spain) Carlos García	(Spain) Logroñés	(Spain) Gimnàstic	Loan return
29 January 2018	(Spain) Carlos García	(Spain) Gimnàstic	(Spain) Jumilla	Loan
29 January 2018	(Nigeria) Brown Ideye	(China) Tianjin TEDA	(Spain) Málaga	Loan
29 January 2018	(Spain) Eneko Jauregi	(Spain) Real Sociedad B	(Spain) Cádiz	Free
29 January 2018	(Denmark) Michael Krohn-Dehli	(Spain) Sevilla	(Spain) Deportivo La Coruña	Free
29 January 2018	(Colombia) Juanjo Narváez	(Spain) Real Betis	(Spain) Córdoba	Loan
29 January 2018	(Spain) Francisco Sandaza	(Spain) Girona	(China) Qingdao Huanghai	Free
29 January 2018	(Qatar) Ahmed Yasser	(Spain) Cultural Leonesa	(Qatar) Al-Duhail	Loan return
30 January 2018	(Portugal) João Afonso	(Spain) Córdoba	(Portugal) Vitória de Guimarães	Loan return
30 January 2018	(Spain) Marc Bartra	(Germany) Borussia Dortmund	(Spain) Real Betis	€10.5M
30 January 2018	(Spain) Cifu	(Spain) Málaga	(Spain) Albacete	Loan
30 January 2018	(Guinea-Bissau) Braima Fati	(Spain) Sabadell	(Spain) Barcelona B	Loan return
30 January 2018	(Guinea-Bissau) Braima Fati	(Spain) Barcelona B	(Belgium) Maasmechelen	Loan
30 January 2018	(Spain) Javi Fuego	(Spain) Espanyol	(Spain) Villarreal	€1.5M
30 January 2018	(Chile) Felipe Gutiérrez	(Spain) Real Betis	(United States) Sporting Kansas City	Free
30 January 2018	(England) Charlie I'Anson	(Spain) Granada	(Spain) Murcia	Free
30 January 2018	(Spain) Eneko Jauregi	(Spain) Cádiz	(Spain) Córdoba	Loan
30 January 2018	(France) Aymeric Laporte	(Spain) Athletic Bilbao	(England) Manchester City	€65M
30 January 2018	(Mexico) Miguel Layún	(Portugal) Porto	(Spain) Sevilla	Loan
30 January 2018	(Honduras) Anthony Lozano	(Spain) Barcelona B	(Spain) Girona	Undisclosed
30 January 2018	(Spain) Iñigo Martínez	(Spain) Real Sociedad	(Spain) Athletic Bilbao	€32M
30 January 2018	(England) Marcus McGuane	(England) Arsenal	(Spain) Barcelona B	Undisclosed
30 January 2018	(Spain) Roque Mesa	(Wales) Swansea City	(Spain) Sevilla	Loan
30 January 2018	(Spain) Matías Nahuel	(Spain) Real Betis	(Spain) Villarreal	Loan return
30 January 2018	(Spain) Matías Nahuel	(Spain) Villarreal	(Spain) Barcelona B	Loan
30 January 2018	(Spain) Manuel Onwu	(Spain) Lorca	(Spain) UCAM Murcia	Free
30 January 2018	(Spain) Sandro Ramírez	(England) Everton	(Spain) Sevilla	Loan
30 January 2018	(Spain) José Antonio Reyes	Unattached	(Spain) Córdoba	Free
31 January 2018	(Portugal) Salvador Agra	(Portugal) Benfica	(Spain) Granada	Loan
31 January 2018	(Spain) Iván Agudo	(Spain) Cultural Leonesa	(Spain) Recreativo	Loan
31 January 2018	(Spain) Quim Araújo	(Spain) Albacete	(Spain) Córdoba	Free
31 January 2018	(Qatar) Akram Afif	(Belgium) Eupen	(Spain) Villarreal	Loan return
31 January 2018	(Qatar) Akram Afif	(Spain) Villarreal	(Qatar) Al Sadd	Loan
31 January 2018	(Spain) Aythami	(Spain) Las Palmas	(Spain) Córdoba	Free
31 January 2018	(Portugal) Bebé	(Spain) Eibar	(Spain) Rayo Vallecano	Loan
31 January 2018	(Jamaica) Deshorn Brown	(United States) D.C. United	(Spain) Lorca	Free
31 January 2018	(Uruguay) Santi Bueno	(Spain) Barcelona B	(Spain) Peralada	Loan
31 January 2018	(Morocco) Mehdi Carcela	(Greece) Olympiacos	(Spain) Granada	Loan return
31 January 2018	(Morocco) Mehdi Carcela	(Spain) Granada	(Belgium) Standard Liège	Loan
31 January 2018	(Spain) José Carlos	(Spain) Lorca	(Spain) Real Betis	Loan return
31 January 2018	(Spain) José Carlos	(Spain) Real Betis	(Spain) Lugo	Loan
31 January 2018	(Spain) David Concha	(Spain) Barcelona B	(Spain) Real Sociedad	Loan return
31 January 2018	(Chile) Juan Delgado	(Spain) Gimnàstic	(Portugal) Tondela	Loan
31 January 2018	(Spain) Guillermo Donoso	(Spain) Lugo	(Spain) Ponferradina	Loan
31 January 2018	(Nigeria) Emmanuel Emenike	(Greece) Olympiacos	(Spain) Las Palmas	Loan
31 January 2018	(Nigeria) Oghenekaro Etebo	(Portugal) Feirense	(Spain) Las Palmas	Loan
31 January 2018	(Spain) Fali	(Spain) Barcelona B	(Spain) Gimnàstic	Loan return
31 January 2018	(Argentina) Augusto Fernández	(Spain) Atlético Madrid	(China) Beijing Renhe	€4.5M
31 January 2018	(Portugal) Bruno Gama	(Spain) Deportivo La Coruña	Unattached	Free
31 January 2018	(Croatia) Tomislav Gomelt	(Croatia) Rijeka	(Spain) Lorca	Loan
31 January 2018	(Spain) Abel Gómez	(Spain) Lorca	(Spain) UCAM Murcia	Free
31 January 2018	(Spain) Alberto Guitián	(Spain) Valladolid	(Spain) Sporting Gijón	Loan
31 January 2018	(Spain) Adán Gurdiel	(Spain) Lorca	(Spain) Racing Santander	Free
31 January 2018	(Denmark) Andrew Hjulsager	(Spain) Celta Vigo	(Spain) Granada	Loan
31 January 2018	(Serbia) Vukašin Jovanović	(France) Bordeaux	(Spain) Eibar	Loan
31 January 2018	(Cameroon) Wilfrid Kaptoum	(Spain) Barcelona B	(Spain) Real Betis B	Free
31 January 2018	(Belgium) Maxime Lestienne	(Russia) Rubin Kazan	(Spain) Málaga	Loan
31 January 2018	(Serbia) Saša Marković	(Spain) Córdoba	(Cyprus) Apollon Limassol	Free
31 January 2018	(Uruguay) Miguel Merentiel	(Spain) Lorca	(Uruguay) Peñarol	Loan return
31 January 2018	(Uruguay) Bruno Montelongo	Unattached	(Spain) Córdoba	Free
31 January 2018	(Mexico) Héctor Moreno	(Italy) Roma	(Spain) Real Sociedad	€6M
31 January 2018	(Spain) Rafa Mújica	(Spain) Barcelona B	(Spain) Cornellà	Loan
31 January 2018	(Spain) Álex Mula	(Spain) Málaga	(Spain) Tenerife	Loan
31 January 2018	(Spain) Nano	(Spain) Eibar	(Spain) Sporting Gijón	Loan
31 January 2018	(Spain) Javier Ontiveros	(Spain) Málaga	(Spain) Valladolid	Loan
31 January 2018	(Romania) Costel Pantilimon	(Spain) Deportivo La Coruña	(England) Watford	Loan return
31 January 2018	(Italy) Giampaolo Pazzini	(Italy) Verona	(Spain) Levante	Loan
31 January 2018	(Brazil) Bruno Perone	(Spain) Gimnàstic	(Spain) Zaragoza	Free
31 January 2018	(Spain) Julio Pleguezuelo	(England) Arsenal	(Spain) Gimnàstic	Loan
31 January 2018	(Spain) Alex Quintanilla	Unattached	(Spain) Córdoba	Free
31 January 2018	(Romania) Răzvan Raț	(Spain) Rayo Vallecano	Unattached	Free
31 January 2018	(Spain) Rubén Rochina	(Russia) Rubin Kazan	(Spain) Levante	Loan
31 January 2018	(Spain) Marc Rovirola	(Spain) Albacete	Unattached	Free
31 January 2018	(Albania) Armando Sadiku	(Poland) Legia Warsaw	(Spain) Levante	Undisclosed
31 January 2018	(Colombia) Carlos Sánchez	(Italy) Fiorentina	(Spain) Espanyol	Loan
31 January 2018	(Serbia) Stefan Šćepović	(Spain) Sporting Gijón	(Spain) Getafe	Loan return
31 January 2018	(Serbia) Stefan Šćepović	(Spain) Getafe	(Hungary) Videoton	Loan
31 January 2018	(Nigeria) Isaac Success	(England) Watford	(Spain) Málaga	Loan
31 January 2018	(Morocco) Oussama Tannane	(Spain) Las Palmas	(France) Saint-Étienne	Loan return
31 January 2018	(Romania) Alin Toșca	(Spain) Real Betis	(Italy) Benevento	Loan
31 January 2018	(Spain) Roberto Trashorras	(Spain) Rayo Vallecano	Unattached	Free
31 January 2018	(Spain) Jesús Valentín	(Spain) Zaragoza	(Spain) Córdoba	Free
31 January 2018	(Argentina) Federico Vega	(Spain) Murcia	(Spain) Lorca	Free
31 January 2018	(Spain) Asier Villalibre	(Spain) Valladolid	(Spain) Athletic Bilbao	Loan return
31 January 2018	(Spain) Asier Villalibre	(Spain) Athletic Bilbao	(Spain) Lorca	Loan
1 February 2018	(Guinea) Lass Bangoura	(Spain) Rayo Vallecano	(Spain) Almería	Loan
1 February 2018	(Portugal) Licá	(Spain) Granada	(Portugal) Belenenses	Free
1 February 2018	(Spain) Toni Martínez	(England) West Ham United	(Spain) Valladolid	Loan
1 February 2018	(Spain) Sergi Samper	(Spain) Las Palmas	(Spain) Barcelona	Loan return
1 February 2018	(Spain) José Luis Trápaga	(Spain) Sabadell	(Spain) Barcelona B	Loan return
1 February 2018	(Spain) José Luis Trápaga	(Spain) Barcelona B	(Spain) Villanovense	Loan
1 February 2018	(Brazil) Xandão	(Spain) Sporting Gijón	(Belgium) Cercle Brugge	Free
2 February 2018	(France) Mathieu Flamini	Unattached	(Spain) Getafe	Free
3 February 2018	(Argentina) Lucas Boyé	(Italy) Torino	(Spain) Celta Vigo	Loan
3 February 2018	(Algeria) Mehdi Lacen	(Spain) Getafe	(Spain) Málaga	Free
9 February 2018	(Nigeria) Imoh Ezekiel	Unattached	(Spain) Las Palmas	Free
