= Carlos García Quesada =

Carlos García Quesada may refer to:

- Carlos García Quesada (cyclist) (born 1978), Spanish retired road racing cyclist
- Carlos García Quesada (footballer) (born 1993), Spanish football midfielder
