= Fran Pérez (footballer, born February 1992) =

Spanish footballer

Fran
Personal information
- Full name: Francisco Pérez Gil
- Date of birth: 10 February 1992 (age 34)
- Place of birth: Girona, Spain
- Position: Midfielder

Team information
- Current team: Bescanó

Youth career
- Girona

Senior career*
Years	Team	Apps	(Gls)
2009–2010	Girona	2	(0)
2011–2012	Riudellots	29	(4)
2012–2014	Girona B	49	(2)
2014–2015	Manlleu	24	(2)
2015–2018	La Jonquera	63	(5)
2018–2019	Farners	31	(1)
2019–2020	Palamós	8	(0)
2020–2022	Bescanó	17	(1)
2022	Lloret	14	(1)
2022–	Bescanó	20	(3)
- * Club domestic league appearances and goals as of 29 April 2023

Francisco Pérez Gil (born 10 February 1992), commonly known as Fran, is a Spanish footballer who plays for CE Bescanó as a midfielder.

== Football career ==
Born in Girona, Catalonia, Fran emerged through Girona FC's youth ranks and made his professional debut on 13 September 2009, coming on as a 72nd-minute substitute in a Segunda División game against Rayo Vallecano (1–1 home draw). He appeared in another match with the first team during his first season.
