= Gerard Muñoz =

Spanish footballer

Personal information
- Full name: Gerard Muñoz Nicolás
- Date of birth: 22 February 1993 (age 33)
- Place of birth: Girona, Spain
- Height: 1.82 m (5 ft 11 1/2 in)
- Position: Forward

Team information
- Current team: Bescanó

Youth career
- Girona

Senior career*
Years	Team	Apps	(Gls)
2012–2014	Girona B	63	(21)
2012	→ Palamós (loan)	4	(0)
2014	Girona	1	(0)
2014–2015	Farners	34	(2)
2015	Manlleu	7	(0)
2015–2016	La Jonquera	23	(5)
2016–2017	Farners		(9)
2017–2018	Girona B	24	(14)
2018–	Bescanó	95	(58)
- * Club domestic league appearances and goals as of 25 February 2023

Gerard Muñoz Nicolás (born 22 February 1993) is a Spanish footballer who plays for CE Bescanó as a forward.

== Football career ==
Born in Girona, Catalonia, Muñoz finished his graduation with Girona FC's youth setup, and made his senior debuts while on loan at Palamós CF in the 2012–13 campaign, in Tercera División.

In October 2012, Muñoz returned to the Albirrojos and was assigned to the reserves in the regional leagues. On 5 January of the following year he played his first match as a professional, coming on as a late substitute in a 1–1 home draw against SD Ponferradina, in the Segunda División championship.

On 2 September 2014 Muñoz joined CE Farners, also in his native region. In the 2015 summer, he joined Tercera División side AEC Manlleu.
