= Javi Jiménez (footballer, born 1996) =

Spanish footballer

Personal information
- Full name: Javier Jiménez Moreno
- Date of birth: 11 January 1996 (age 30)
- Place of birth: Quesada, Spain
- Height: 1.70 m (5 ft 7 in)
- Position: Left back

Team information
- Current team: Hércules
- Number: 24

Youth career
- Úbeda Viva
- Villarreal

Senior career*
Years	Team	Apps	(Gls)
2015–2016	Villarreal C	29	(5)
2016–2017	Málaga B	36	(1)
2017–2019	Gimnàstic	36	(0)
2019	Cultural Leonesa	15	(0)
2019–2020	Cornellà	23	(0)
2020–2021	Mirandés	32	(0)
2021–2023	Málaga	53	(1)
2023–2025	Ibiza	69	(3)
2025–	Hércules	31	(0)

International career
2012–2013	Spain U17	5	(0)
- * Club domestic league appearances and goals as of 10 June 2026

Javier "Javi" Jiménez Moreno (born 11 January 1996) is a Spanish footballer who plays as a left back for Primera Federación club Hércules.

== Club career ==
Born in Quesada, Jaén, Andalusia, Jiménez represented CD Úbeda Viva and Villarreal CF as a youth. He made his senior debut with the C-team on 11 January 2015, starting in a 0–1 Tercera División away loss against CD Castellón.

Jiménez scored his first senior goals on 13 March 2016, netting a brace in a 5–2 home routing of UD Benigànim. In July, he signed for Málaga CF, being assigned to the reserves also in the fourth division.

On 30 July 2017, Jiménez signed a three-year deal with Segunda División club Gimnàstic de Tarragona, after cutting ties with Málaga. He made his professional debut on 20 August, starting in a 0–1 home loss against UD Almería.

On 31 January 2019, after struggling with injuries, Jiménez terminated his contract with Nàstic and signed a two-and-a-half-year deal with Cultural y Deportiva Leonesa in the third division. On 30 August, he moved to UE Cornellà also in division three.

On 11 August 2020, Jiménez returned to the second division after agreeing to a one-year deal with CD Mirandés. The following 16 June, he returned to Málaga on a two-year contract, now being assigned to the main squad also in the second division.

Jiménez scored his first professional goal on 27 August 2022, netting the opener in a 3–1 away win over former side Mirandés.
