= Lass Kourouma =

Guinean footballer

Personal information
- Full name: Lancinet Kourouma Kourouma
- Date of birth: 30 March 2004 (age 22)
- Place of birth: Conakry, Guinea
- Height: 1.80 m (5 ft 11 in)
- Position: Midfielder

Team information
- Current team: Girona B
- Number: 15

Youth career
- 2019–2020: Damm
- 2020–2023: Levante

Senior career*
Years	Team	Apps	(Gls)
2023–2024	Levante B	30	(1)
2024–2025	Levante	1	(0)
2024–2025	→ Ibiza (loan)	7	(0)
2025–	Girona B	34	(0)
2025–	Girona	7	(0)
- * Club domestic league appearances and goals as of 19 September 2026

Lancinet "Lass" Kourouma Kourouma (born 30 March 2004) is a Guinean footballer who plays as a midfielder for Spanish club Girona FC B.

== Career ==
Born in Conakry, Kourouma moved to Barcelona in 2019 and joined the youth sides of CF Damm. He moved to Levante UD in the following year, but had to wait 18 months to play due to FIFA regulations.

On 27 July 2022, Kourouma signed his first professional contract with the Granotes, after agreeing to a three-year contract. Promoted to the reserves ahead of the 2023–24 season, he made his senior debut on 9 September 2023, starting in a 3–0 Tercera Federación away win over Patacona CF.

Kourouma scored his first senior goal on 17 February 2024, netting opener for the B's in a 2–1 away loss to Atzeneta UE. He made his first team debut on 2 June, coming on as a second-half substitute for Ángel Algobia in a 0–0 Segunda División away draw against SD Huesca.

On 13 August 2024, Kourouma was loaned to Primera Federación side UD Ibiza for the season.

== Personal life ==
Kourouma's brothers Ilaix Moriba and Baba Kourouma are also footballers.

== Career statistics ==
As of match played 27 October 2026

Appearances and goals by club, season and competition
Club	Season	League			Cup		Europe		Other		Total	
Club	Season	Division	Apps	Goals	Apps	Goals	Apps	Goals	Apps	Goals	Apps	Goals
Levante B	2023–24	Tercera Federación	30	1	—		—		—		30	1
Levante	2023–24	Segunda División	1	0	—		—		—		1	0
Ibiza (loan)	2024–25	Primera Federación	7	0	1	0	—		—		8	0
Girona B	2024–25	Tercera Federación	20	0	—		—		5 (Note: Appearances in 2025 Tercera Federación play-offs)	0	25	0
Girona B	2025–26	Segunda Federación	9	0	—		—		—		9	0
Girona B	Total		29	0	—		—		5	0	34	0
Girona	2025–26	La Liga	5	0	2	0	—		—		7	0
Girona	2026–27	Segunda División	2	0	1	0	—		—		3	0
Girona	Total		7	0	3	0	—		—		10	0
Career total			67	1	3	0	0	0	6	0	76	1
