= CF Riudellots =

Spanish football team

Riudellots
- Full name: Club de Futbol Riudellots
- Nickname(s): Riu
- Founded: 2001
- Dissolved: 2012
- Ground: Municipal, Riudellots de la Selva, Catalonia, Spain
- Capacity: 2,000
Home colours

Club de Futbol Riudellots was a Spanish football team based in Riudellots de la Selva, Girona, in the autonomous community of Catalonia. It last played in Segona Catalana, and their home was Camp Municipal de Riudellots de la Selva.

In June 2011, Riudellots was bought by Girona FC, and subsequently became its reserve team. The club was dissolved in the following year, with Girona FC B taking its place.

== Season to season ==
Season	Tier	Division	Place	Copa del Rey
2001–02	8	3ª Terr.	7th	
2002–03	8	3ª Terr.	7th	
2003–04	8	3ª Terr.	8th	
2004–05	8	3ª Terr.	1st	
2005–06	7	2ª Terr.	5th	
2006–07	7	2ª Terr.	3rd	
2007–08	7	2ª Terr.	18th	
2008–09	8	3ª Terr.	2nd	
2009–10	7	2ª Terr.	2nd	
2010–11	7	2ª Terr.	1st	
2011–12	6	2ª Cat.	11th	N/A (Note: Reserve team of Girona FC.)

== Notable players ==
- (France) Nigel Atangana
- (Spain) Fran Pérez
- (Spain) David Juncà
- (Spain) Marc Rovirola

== See also ==
- Girona FC
- Girona FC B
