= Javi Sarasa =

Spanish footballer

Personal information
- Full name: Javier Sarasa Camañes
- Date of birth: 22 July 2005 (age 21)
- Place of birth: Spain
- Position: Winger

Team information
- Current team: Girona B
- Number: 8

Youth career
- Atlètic Sant Just
- 2020–2023: Damm
- 2023–2024: Girona

Senior career*
Years	Team	Apps	(Gls)
2023–	Girona B	73	(5)
2025–	Girona	3	(0)
- * Club domestic league appearances and goals as of 4 October 2026

Javier "Javi" Sarasa Camañes (born 22 July 2005) is a Spanish footballer who plays as a winger for Girona FC B.

== Career ==
Sarasa played for Atlètic Sant Just FC and CF Damm as a youth before joining Girona FC's B-team on 20 July 2023. He made his senior debut on 10 September, coming on as a half-time substitute in a 3–2 Tercera Federación away loss to UE Tona.

Sarasa subsequently established himself in the B-side before suffering a fibula fracture in January 2025, which sidelined him for more than four months. On 10 July of that year, he renewed his link until 2028.

Sarasa made his first team debut with the Blanquivermells on 3 December 2025, starting in a 2–1 away loss to Ourense CF, for the season's Copa del Rey. He made his professional debut the following 19 September, replacing Yáser Asprilla in a 2–1 Segunda División away win over Cádiz CF.

== Career statistics ==
As of match played 4 October 2026

Appearances and goals by club, season and competition
Club	Season	League			Cup		Other		Total	
Club	Season	Division	Apps	Goals	Apps	Goals	Apps	Goals	Apps	Goals
Girona B	2024–25	Segunda Federación	36	1	—		1 (Note: Appearance in 2025 Segunda Federación play-offs)	0	37	1
Girona B	2025–26	Segunda Federación	36	4	—		—		36	4
Girona B	2026–27	Segunda Federación	1	0	—		—		1	0
Girona B	Total		73	5	—		1	0	74	5
Girona	2026–27	Segunda División	3	0	0	0	—		3	0
Career total			76	5	0	0	1	0	77	5
