= Baba Kourouma =

Spanish footballer (born 2009)

Personal information
- Full name: Baba Kourouma Kourouma
- Date of birth: 23 March 2009 (age 17)
- Place of birth: Guinea
- Height: 1.76 m (5 ft 9 in)
- Position: Centre-back

Team information
- Current team: Barcelona

Youth career
- 2021–2025: Barcelona

Senior career*
Years	Team	Apps	(Gls)
2025–	Barcelona B	0	(0)
- * Club domestic league appearances and goals as of 17:44, 24 May 2025 (UTC)

Baba Kourouma Kourouma (born 23 March 2009) is a Spanish footballer who currently plays as a centre-back for Barcelona.

== Early and personal life ==
Born in Guinea, Kourouma is the brother of fellow professional footballers Ilaix Moriba and Lass Kourouma.

== Club career ==
Kourouma moved to Spain as a child, but due to bureaucratic issues, he was unable to join any clubs for a year, playing football on the streets instead. He joined Barcelona's La Masia academy in 2021. In January 2025, following interest from English Premier League club Manchester City, Barcelona began contract discussions with Kourouma. Later in the same month, Kourouma agreed a three-year deal with Barça, effective as soon as he turned sixteen.

Having progressed to the Juvenil B side, he was called up to Barcelona's B team in March 2025 for their Copa Catalunya match against Espanyol B, playing the entire second half in Barcelona's 5–0 loss on 19 March. Three days later he made his first start for the club's Juvenil A side, featuring in their 1–1 draw with Gimnàstic de Tarragona on 22 March. On 14 May 2025 he signed a contract renewal with Barcelona, keeping him with the club until July 2028.

== Style of play ==
Predominantly a centre-back, Kourouma has featured at left-back for Barcelona's youth teams, and is also comfortable playing in midfield.

== Career statistics ==
=== Club ===
As of 24 May 2025.

Appearances and goals by club, season and competition
Club	Season	League			Cup		Other		Total	
Club	Season	Division	Apps	Goals	Apps	Goals	Apps	Goals	Apps	Goals
Barcelona B	2024–25	Primera Federación	0	0	0	0	1 (Note: Appearances in the Copa Catalunya)	0	1	0
Career total			0	0	0	0	1	0	1	0
