= Jon Gaztañaga =

Spanish footballer

Personal information
- Full name: Jon Gaztañaga Arrospide
- Date of birth: 28 June 1991 (age 35)
- Place of birth: Andoain, Spain
- Height: 1.81 m (5 ft 11 in)
- Positions: Centre-back; defensive midfielder

Youth career
- Real Sociedad

Senior career*
Years	Team	Apps	(Gls)
2009–2014	Real Sociedad B	115	(3)
2013–2017	Real Sociedad	8	(0)
2015	→ Ponferradina (loan)	12	(0)
2015–2016	→ Numancia (loan)	34	(0)
2017–2018	Gimnàstic	27	(0)
2018–2020	AEL Limassol	38	(1)
2020–2021	Viitorul	18	(1)
2021–2022	Cultural Leonesa	27	(2)
2022–2023	NorthEast United	13	(0)
2023	Karmiotissa	20	(0)
2023–2024	Barakaldo	29	(1)
2024–2026	Beasain	52	(3)

International career
2007	Spain U16	4	(0)
2007–2008	Spain U17	7	(1)
Medal record
Men's football
Representing Spain
UEFA European Under-17 Championship
Winner	2008 Turkey
- * Club domestic league appearances and goals as of 7 May 2026

Jon Gaztañaga Arrospide (born 28 June 1991) is a Spanish professional footballer who plays as a central defender or a defensive midfielder.

== Club career ==
Born in Andoain, Gipuzkoa, Gaztañaga was a product of Real Sociedad's youth system. He made his senior debut with their reserves, spending several seasons in the Segunda División B with the side and also achieving promotion from Tercera División in 2010.

Gaztañaga made his official debut with the first team on 18 August 2013, replacing fellow youth graduate Gorka Elustondo in the dying minutes of the 2–0 La Liga home win against Getafe. His first appearance in the UEFA Champions League took place on 10 December, as he came on for Mikel González in a 0–1 group-stage defeat to Bayer Leverkusen also at the Anoeta Stadium.

In early 2014, Gaztañaga renewed his contract with Real Sociedad until 2016, being promoted to the main squad in May. On 26 January 2015, having featured sparingly during the first half of the campaign, he joined Segunda División club Ponferradina on loan until June.

On 9 July 2015, Gaztañaga was loaned to Numancia of the same league for one year. On 22 August 2017, he agreed to a three-year deal with Gimnàstic de Tarragona also from the second tier after becoming a free agent.

Gaztañaga terminated his contract with Nàstic on 13 June 2018. On 20 August, he moved abroad for the first time in his career and joined Cypriot First Division side AEL Limassol. He made his debut five days later, coming on for Marko Adamović late into a 1–0 away victory over Ermis Aradippou.

Gaztañaga spent 2020–21 in the Romanian Liga I with Viitorul Constanța. On 24 June 2021, he returned to Spain and joined Cultural Leonesa of the newly created Primera División RFEF.

On 7 September 2022, Gaztañaga signed for NorthEast United of the Indian Super League on a one-year contract.

== International career ==
Gaztañaga was picked by the Spain under-17 team for the 2008 UEFA European Championship. He started as a stopper in the final against France, which ended with a 4–0 win.

Gaztañaga was selected by the under-18 side for the unofficial 2009 Copa del Atlántico, which his country won.

== Career statistics ==
As of 15 January 2023

Appearances and goals by club, season and competition
Club	Season	League			National cup (Note: Includes Copa del Rey, Cypriot Cup, Cupa României)		Continental		Other		Total	
Club	Season	Division	Apps	Goals	Apps	Goals	Apps	Goals	Apps	Goals	Apps	Goals
Real Sociedad B	2010–11	Segunda División B	30	1	0	0	—		—		30	1
Real Sociedad B	2011–12	Segunda División B	30	1	0	0	—		—		30	1
Real Sociedad B	2012–13	Segunda División B	24	0	0	0	—		—		24	0
Real Sociedad B	2013–14	Segunda División B	31	1	0	0	—		—		31	1
Real Sociedad B	Total		115	3	0	0	0	0	0	0	115	3
Real Sociedad	2013–14	La Liga	3	0	5	0	1 (Note: Appearance in UEFA Champions League)	0	—		9	0
Real Sociedad	2014–15	La Liga	3	0	2	0	—		—		5	0
Real Sociedad	2016–17	La Liga	2	0	2	0	—		—		4	0
Real Sociedad	Total		8	0	9	0	1	0	0	0	18	0
Ponferradina (loan)	2014–15	Segunda División	12	0	0	0	—		—		12	0
Numancia (loan)	2015–16	Segunda División	34	0	0	0	—		—		34	0
Gimnàstic	2017–18	Segunda División	27	0	1	0	—		1 (Note: Appearance in Copa Catalunya)	0	29	0
AEL Limassol	2018–19	Cypriot First Division	17	0	6	0	—		7 (Note: Appearances in Cypriot First Division championship round)	1	30	1
AEL Limassol	2019–20	Cypriot First Division	14	0	4	0	2 (Note: Appearances in UEFA Europa League)	0	1 (Note: Appearance in Cypriot Super Cup)	0	21	0
AEL Limassol	Total		31	0	10	0	2	0	8	1	51	1
Viitorul	2020–21	Liga I	18	1	1	0	—		—		19	1
Cultural Leonesa	2021–22	Primera División RFEF	27	2	2	1	—		—		29	3
NorthEast United	2022–23	Indian Super League	13	0	0	0	—		—		13	0
Career total			285	6	23	1	3	0	9	1	320	8

== Honours ==
Real Sociedad B

- Tercera División: 2009–10

AEL Limassol

- Cypriot Cup: 2018–19

Spain U17

- UEFA European Under-17 Championship: 2008
