= Biel Farrés =

Spanish footballer

Personal information
- Full name: Biel Farrés del Castillo
- Date of birth: 1 May 2002 (age 24)
- Place of birth: Vic, Spain
- Position: Centre back

Team information
- Current team: Girona B
- Number: 3

Youth career
- Vic Riuprimer
- 2011–2017: Barcelona
- 2017–2019: Gimnàstic Manresa
- 2019–2021: Damm

Senior career*
Years	Team	Apps	(Gls)
2021–	Girona B	133	(6)
2021–	Girona	2	(0)
2023	→ Sabadell (loan)	0	(0)
- * Club domestic league appearances and goals as of 15 May 2026

Biel Farrés del Castillo (born 1 May 2002) is a Spanish footballer who plays as a central defender for Girona FC B.

== Club career ==
Born in Vic, Barcelona, Catalonia, Farrés joined FC Barcelona's La Masia in 2011, from hometown side Vic Riuprimer REFO FC. He remained at the club until 2017, and subsequently represented Club Gimnàstic de Manresa and CF Damm as a youth.

In July 2021, after finishing his formation, Farrés joined Girona FC and was assigned to the reserves in the Tercera División RFEF. He made his senior debut on 5 September, starting in a 2–1 away win over CE L'Hospitalet.

Farrés scored his first senior goal on 28 November 2021, netting the B's only goal in a 1–0 home success over FE Grama. He made his first team debut the following 6 January, starting in a 1–0 home win over CA Osasuna in the season's Copa del Rey.

On 25 July 2023, Farrés was loaned to Primera Federación side CE Sabadell FC, for one year. He returned to Girona after just three months after failing to appear in any league match.

== International career ==
Farrés was a part of the Catalan under-16 selection in 2017 and 2018.

== Career statistics ==
As of match played 6 April 2025

Appearances and goals by club, season and competition
Club	Season	League			Cup		Europe		Other		Total	
Club	Season	Division	Apps	Goals	Apps	Goals	Apps	Goals	Apps	Goals	Apps	Goals
Girona B	2021–22	Tercera División	27	1	—		—		—		27	1
Girona B	2022–23	Tercera Federación	27	2	—		—		—		27	2
Girona B	2023–24	Tercera Federación	20	1	—		—		—		20	1
Girona B	2024–25	Tercera Federación	25	1	—		—		—		25	1
Girona B	Total		99	5	—		—		—		99	5
Girona	2021–22	Segunda División	2	0	1	0	—		—		3	0
Girona	2024–25	La Liga	0	0	0	0	—		1 (Note: Appearances in Copa Catalunya)	0	1	0
Girona	Total		2	0	1	0	—		1	0	4	0
Sabadell (loan)	2023–24	Primera Federación	0	0	0	0	—		—		0	0
Career total			101	5	1	0	0	0	1	0	103	5
