= Marc Rovirola =

Spanish footballer (born 1992)

Personal information
- Full name: Marc Rovirola Moreno
- Date of birth: 12 September 1992 (age 34)
- Place of birth: Cornellà del Terri, Spain
- Height: 1.77 m (5 ft 10 in)
- Position: Midfielder

Youth career
- 2000–2002: Cornellà Terri
- 2002–2010: Banyoles
- 2010–2011: Girona

Senior career*
Years	Team	Apps	(Gls)
2009–2010	Banyoles	28	(0)
2011–2012	Riudellots	30	(0)
2012–2015	Girona B	76	(4)
2015	Girona	6	(0)
2015–2016	Llagostera	0	(0)
2015–2016	→ Fuenlabrada (loan)	34	(1)
2016–2018	Albacete	27	(0)
2018–2020	Atlético Baleares	58	(0)
2020–2022	Cultural Leonesa	30	(0)
- * Club domestic league appearances and goals

Marc Rovirola Moreno (born 12 September 1992) is a Spanish former footballer who played as a midfielder.

== Club career ==
Born in Cornellà del Terri, Girona, Catalonia, Rovirola made his first team debuts with CD Banyoles in the 2009–10 campaign, in the regional leagues. In the 2010 summer he moved to Girona FC after having trials at FC Barcelona and Real Zaragoza, returning to youth football.

Rovirola subsequently appeared with CF Riudellots, the club's farm team, and with the reserves, both in the lower levels. On 4 March 2015, he played his first match as a professional, coming on as a late substitute for Álex Granell in a 2–1 home win against Real Valladolid in the Segunda División

On 11 July 2015, Rovirola moved to fellow league team UE Llagostera, after agreeing to a two-year deal, being subsequently loaned to CF Fuenlabrada. On 16 July of the following year he signed for Albacete Balompié, helping the club in their return to the second level.

On 31 January 2018, after failing to make an appearance during the first half of the campaign, Rovirola terminated his contract. On 22 February, he agreed to a deal with CD Atlético Baleares in the third division.

On 9 September 2020, he agreed a one-season deal with an option for another one with Cultural y Deportiva Leonesa.
