= Iván de Nova =

Spanish footballer

Personal information
- Full name: Iván de Nova Ruiz
- Date of birth: 22 September 1996 (age 30)
- Place of birth: Tarragona, Spain
- Height: 1.84 m (6 ft 0 in)
- Position: Left back

Team information
- Current team: Sarnese
- Number: 44

Youth career
- Gimnàstic

Senior career*
Years	Team	Apps	(Gls)
2015–2019	Pobla Mafumet	51	(0)
2015–2016	→ Ascó (loan)	27	(0)
2017–2018	→ Gimnàstic	0	(0)
2019–2020	Villanovense	2	(0)
2020	CF Igualada		
2020-2021	UA Horta		
2021–2023	Inter Club d'Escaldes	43	(2)
2023	Gallipoli	12	(0)
2023–2024	Matera	5	(1)
2024	Virtus Francavilla	10	(0)
2024–	Sarnese	1	(0)
- * Club domestic league appearances and goals as of 17 November 2024

Iván de Nova Ruiz (born 22 September 1996) is a Spanish professional footballer who plays for Italian Serie D club Sarnese. Mainly a left back, he can also play as a central defender.

== Club career ==
Born in Tarragona, Catalonia, de Nova represented Gimnàstic de Tarragona as a youth. On 22 August 2015 he was loaned to Tercera División club FC Ascó, making his senior debut during the campaign.

Upon returning from loan, de Nova was assigned to the farm team also in the fourth level, and renewed his contract until 2020 on 7 August 2017. He made his professional debut on 12 September 2018, starting in a 0–2 away loss against Córdoba CF, for the season's Copa del Rey.

De Nova was released on 14 June 2019, as his contract expired. On 18 July 2019, he signed with CF Villanovense.
