= Omar Perdomo =

Spanish footballer

Personal information
- Full name: José Omar Perdomo Machado
- Date of birth: 3 July 1993 (age 33)
- Place of birth: Las Palmas, Spain
- Height: 1.74 m (5 ft 8 1/2 in)
- Position: Winger

Team information
- Current team: Minera
- Number: 10

Youth career
- San Juan Tres Palmas
- 2009–2011: Universidad LP
- 2011–2012: Las Palmas

Senior career*
Years	Team	Apps	(Gls)
2010–2011	Universidad LP	5	(0)
2012–2013	Las Palmas C		
2012–2013	Las Palmas B	15	(1)
2013–2014	Unión Viera	20	(11)
2014	Atlético Madrid C	11	(0)
2014–2015	Estrella	18	(3)
2015	Tenerife B	11	(3)
2015–2018	Tenerife	70	(8)
2017–2018	→ Gimnàstic (loan)	16	(2)
2018–2019	Gimnàstic	8	(0)
2019	Ibiza	11	(0)
2019–2021	San Fernando	45	(9)
2021–2022	Córdoba	25	(5)
2022–2023	Linense	33	(3)
2023–2024	Estepona	28	(5)
2024–	Minera	63	(22)
- * Club domestic league appearances and goals as of 7 May 2026

José Omar Perdomo Machado (born 3 July 1993) is a Spanish footballer who plays for Minera as a winger.

== Club career ==
Born in Las Palmas, Canary Islands, Perdomo graduated with Universidad de Las Palmas CF's youth setup, and made his senior debuts in the 2010–11 campaign, in the Segunda División B. In the 2011 summer he moved to UD Las Palmas, returning to youth football.

After representing the latter's C and B-sides, Perdomo moved to CF Unión Viera in 2013. After scoring 11 goals for the club he joined Atlético Madrid in January 2014, being assigned to the C-team also in the fourth level.

In the 2014 summer Perdomo signed for Estrella CF, but on 22 January 2015, joined another reserve team, CD Tenerife B in the fourth division. He made his first-team debut for the latter on 10 May, coming on as a late substitute for Javi Moyano in a 0–1 away loss against Racing de Santander in the Segunda División.

Perdomo scored his first professional goal on 25 October 2015, netting his team's first in a 2–2 home draw against CA Osasuna. The following 1 April he renewed his contract until 2018, being definitely promoted to the main squad.

On 13 July 2017, Perdomo was loaned to fellow second tier club Gimnàstic de Tarragona for one year, with a permanent three-year deal subsequently arranged. The following 6 June, it was announced that Tenerife opted against his return, and he signed for Nàstic permanently.

On 31 January 2019, Perdomo signed for third division side UD Ibiza after terminating his contract with the Catalans.
