= Manu Barreiro =

Spanish footballer (born 1986)

Personal information
- Full name: Manuel Barreiro Bustelo
- Date of birth: 8 July 1986 (age 40)
- Place of birth: Compostela, Spain
- Height: 1.91 m (6 ft 3 in)
- Position: Forward

Youth career
- Real Madrid
- Valencia

Senior career*
Years	Team	Apps	(Gls)
2004–2005	Valencia B	3	(1)
2005–2006	Lalín	33	(8)
2006–2008	Algeciras	52	(16)
2008	Cádiz B	12	(8)
2008–2009	Cádiz	22	(2)
2009	Jerez Industrial	16	(6)
2010	Zamora	7	(0)
2010–2011	Cerceda	32	(20)
2011–2012	Pontevedra	35	(13)
2012–2014	Racing Ferrol	69	(42)
2014–2016	Alavés	63	(16)
2017–2019	Gimnàstic	78	(16)
2019–2023	Lugo	156	(30)
2023–2025	Compostela	65	(13)
- * Club domestic league appearances and goals as of 15 June 2025

Manuel 'Manu' Barreiro Bustelo (born 8 July 1986) is a Spanish professional footballer who plays as a forward.

== Club career ==
Born in Santiago de Compostela, Galicia, Barreiro was a Valencia CF youth graduate. He made his debut as a senior with the reserves in the 2004–05 season, in the Tercera División.

After prolific lower league spells at CD Lalín and Algeciras CF, Barreiro joined Cádiz CF on 31 January 2008. Initially assigned to the B side, he made his first-team debut on 20 April 2008, coming on as a late substitute for Natalio in a 1–0 Segunda División away win against CD Numancia.

Barreiro scored his first professional goal on 18 May 2008, but in a 5–2 loss at RC Celta de Vigo. After the club's relegation to Segunda División B, he was definitely promoted to the main squad.

Released by Cádiz in the summer of 2009, Barreiro subsequently represented Jerez Industrial CF, Zamora CF, CCD Cerceda, Pontevedra CF and Racing de Ferrol. With the latter, he scored a career-best 21 goals in two consecutive seasons, as his team achieved promotion to the third division and missed out another in the play-offs.

On 27 June 2014, Barreiro returned to division two after six years, signing for Deportivo Alavés. He scored 11 goals for the Basques in his debut campaign, including braces against CA Osasuna and CD Lugo, and added a further five in the following as they returned to La Liga after ten years.

After making no league appearances during the first half of the season, Barreiro terminated his contract on 22 December 2016 and joined second-tier club Gimnàstic de Tarragona just hours later. He was sent off for two bookable offences on his debut – a 1–1 home draw with CD Tenerife – the latter for not wearing the obligatory shinpads.

Barreiro signed a three-and-a-half-year deal with second-division Lugo on 28 January 2019. In 2020–21, he totalled a squad-best 12 goals for the 18th-placed side, the last outside the relegation zone.

== Honours ==
Cádiz

- Segunda División B: 2008–09

Alavés

- Segunda División: 2015–16
