= Julio Pleguezuelo =

Spanish footballer

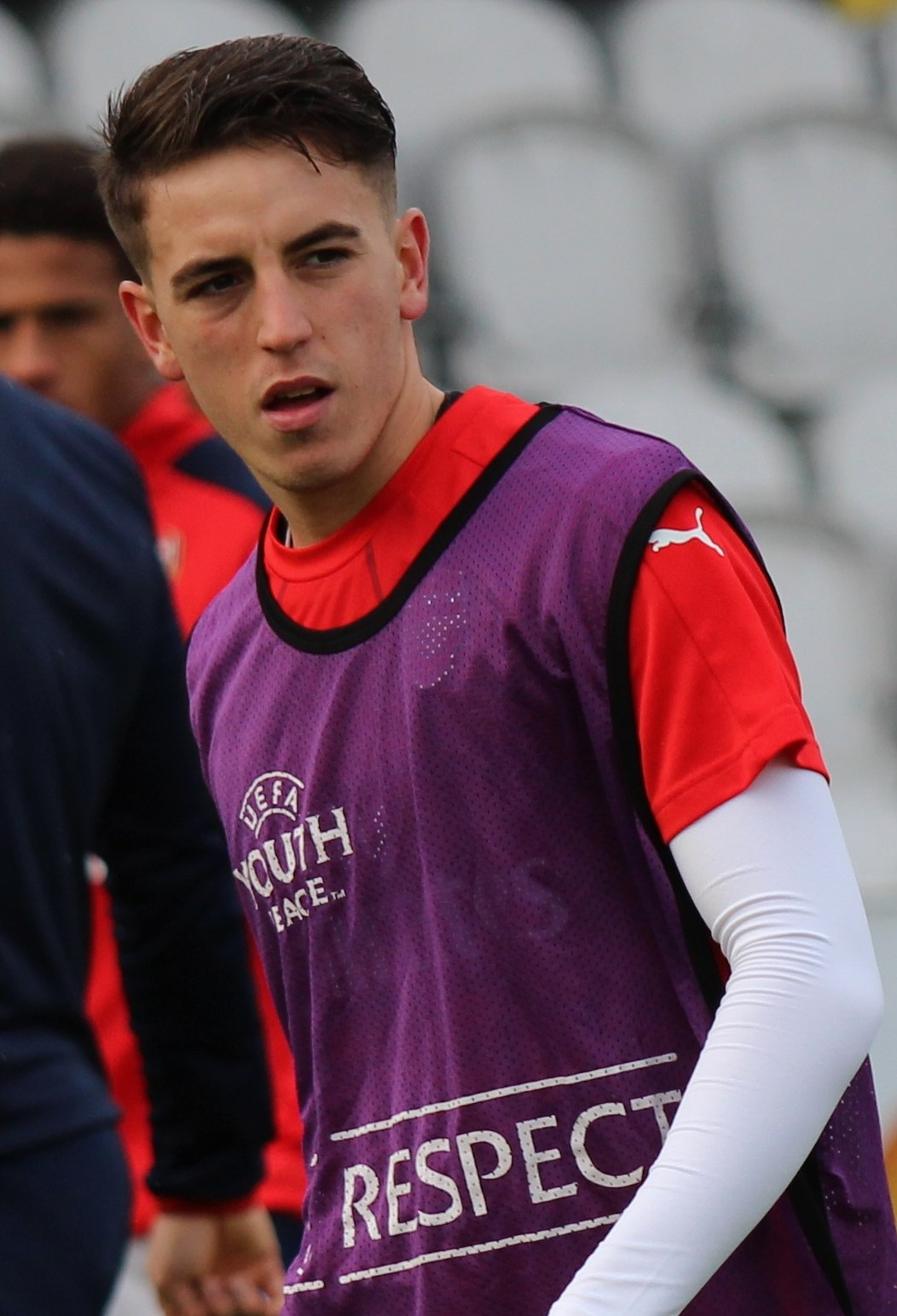
- Pleguezuelo with Arsenal U19 in 2015

Personal information
- Full name: Julio José Pleguezuelo Selva
- Date of birth: 26 January 1997 (age 29)
- Place of birth: Palma, Spain
- Height: 1.80 m (5 ft 11 in)
- Position: Centre back

Team information
- Current team: Plymouth Argyle
- Number: 5

Youth career
- 2003–2004: Atlético Baleares
- 2004–2010: Espanyol
- 2010–2011: Atlético Madrid
- 2011–2013: Barcelona
- 2013–2016: Arsenal

Senior career*
Years	Team	Apps	(Gls)
2016–2019	Arsenal	0	(0)
2016–2017	→ Mallorca (loan)	15	(0)
2018	→ Gimnàstic (loan)	10	(0)
2019–2023	Twente	84	(3)
2023–	Plymouth Argyle	74	(1)

International career
- Spain U16
2014	Spain U17	4	(0)
2014	Spain U18	2	(0)
- * Club domestic league appearances and goals as of 24 October 2026 (UTC)

Julio José Pleguezuelo Selva (Spanish pronunciation: [ˈxuljo xoˈse pleɣeˈθwelo ˈselβa], born 26 January 1997) is a Spanish professional footballer who plays for EFL League One club Plymouth Argyle.

== Club career ==
=== Early career ===
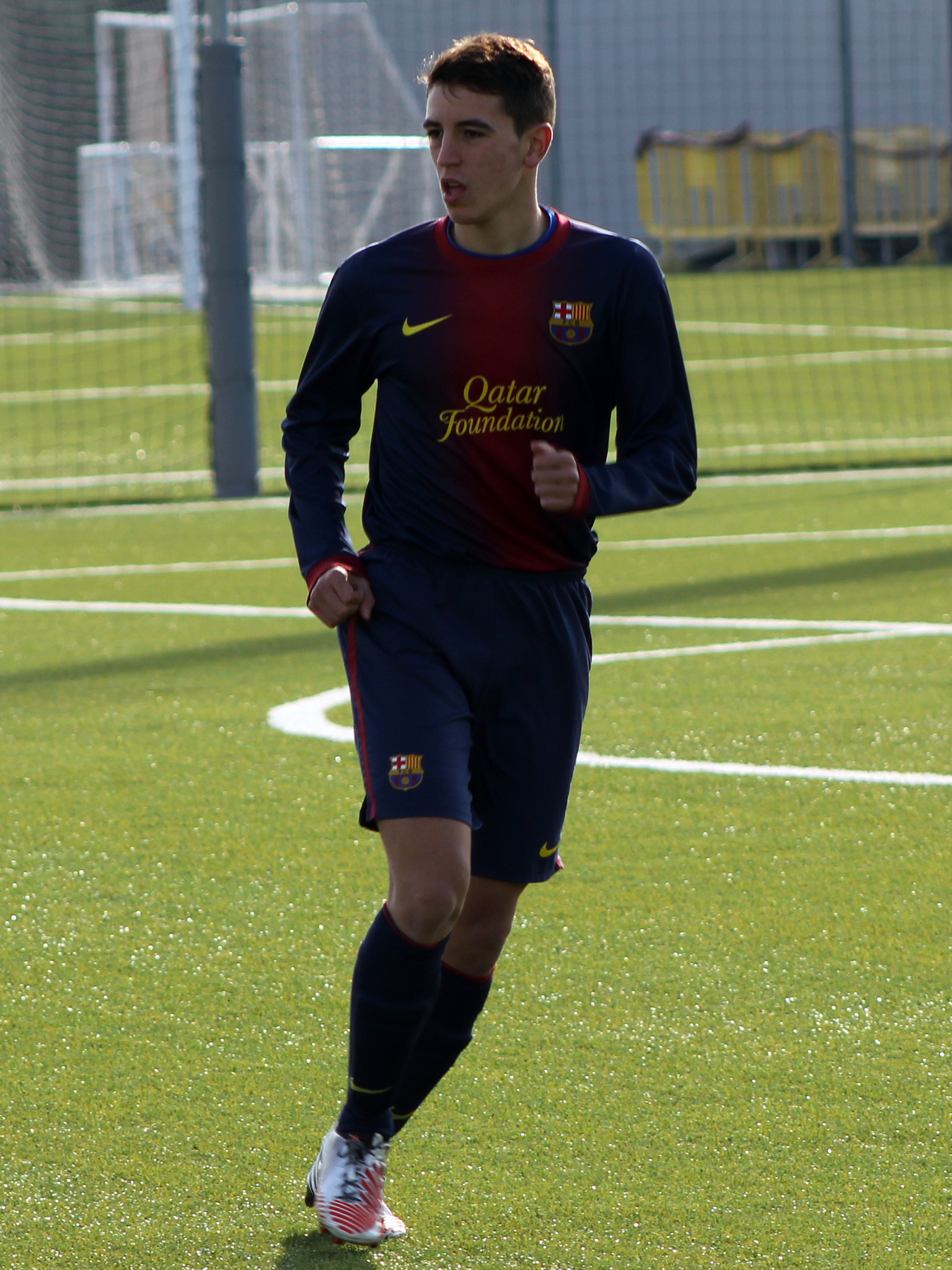
Pleguezuelo whilst with Barcelona

Pleguezuelo was born in Palma, Majorca, Balearic Islands. In 2004, he joined Espanyol's youth setup, after starting out at Atlético Baleares.

In 2010, Pleguezuelo moved to Atlético Madrid. The following year, however, he signed for Barcelona, being linked to Premier League sides Arsenal, Manchester City and Tottenham Hotspur during his spell at the latter.

=== Arsenal ===
In July 2013, shortly after turning 16, Pleguezuelo moved abroad and signed for the Arsenal. On 11 April of the following year, after becoming a key unit at the club's under-18 squad, he signed his first professional contract.

Pleguezuelo established himself as the captain of the under-21 side during the 2015–16 campaign. He went on to lead Arsenal to victory in the 2016 U21 Premier League 2 play-off final, which was won by three goals to one against Aston Villa.

Pleguezuelo made his senior Arsenal debut against Blackpool in the EFL Cup on 31 October 2018.

==== Mallorca (loan) ====
On 5 August 2016, Pleguezuelo was loaned to Segunda División side Mallorca, for one year. He made his professional debut on 7 September, starting in a 1–0 Copa del Rey home win against Reus.

On 9 October 2016, Pleguezuelo made his debut in the second tier, playing the last nine minutes in a 3–0 home win against Huesca. After 15 matches and a subsequent relegation, he returned to his parent club.

==== Gimnàstic (loan) ====
On 31 January 2018, Pleguezuelo was loaned to Gimnàstic in the second division until the end of the season.

=== Twente ===
On 21 May 2019, Pleguezuelo joined Twente of the Eredivisie on a free transfer. He signed a two-year deal with the option of a third

=== Plymouth Argyle ===
On 21 June 2023, Pleguezuelo joined newly-promoted Championship club Plymouth Argyle on a two-year contract. The move saw him become the first Spanish player to play for the club.

== Career statistics ==
=== Club ===
As of match played 24 October 2026

Appearances and goals by club, season and competition
Club	Season	League			National cup (Note: Includes Copa del Rey, KNVB Cup, FA Cup)		League cup (Note: Includes EFL Cup)		Europe		Other		Total	
Club	Season	Division	Apps	Goals	Apps	Goals	Apps	Goals	Apps	Goals	Apps	Goals	Apps	Goals
Arsenal	2016–17	Premier League	0	0	0	0	0	0	0	0	—		0	0
Arsenal	2017–18	Premier League	0	0	0	0	0	0	0	0	—		0	0
Arsenal	2018–19	Premier League	0	0	0	0	1	0	0	0	—		1	0
Arsenal	Total		0	0	0	0	1	0	0	0	—		1	0
Arsenal U21	2018–19	—	—		—		—		—		2 (Note: Appearance(s) in EFL Trophy)	0	2	0
Mallorca (loan)	2016–17	Segunda División	15	0	2	0	—		—		—		17	0
Gimnàstic (loan)	2017–18	Segunda División	10	0	0	0	—		—		—		10	0
Twente	2019–20	Eredivisie	19	0	1	0	—		—		—		20	0
Twente	2020–21	Eredivisie	19	1	1	0	—		—		—		20	1
Twente	2021–22	Eredivisie	23	0	3	0	—		—		—		26	0
Twente	2022–23	Eredivisie	23	2	1	0	—		2 (Note: Appearance(s) in UEFA Europa Conference League)	0	4 (Note: Appearance(s) in Eredivisie European competition play-offs)	0	30	2
Twente	Total		84	3	8	0	—		2	0	4	0	96	3
Plymouth Argyle	2023–24	Championship	32	0	1	0	2	0	—		—		35	0
Plymouth Argyle	2024–25	Championship	24	1	3	0	2	0	—		—		29	1
Plymouth Argyle	2025–26	League One	9	0	0	0	0	0	—		2 (Note: Appearances in EFL Trophy)	0	11	0
Plymouth Argyle	2026–27	League One	10	0	0	0	1	0	—		1	0	12	0
Plymouth Argyle	Total		75	1	4	0	5	0	—		3	0	87	1
Career total			184	4	12	0	6	0	2	0	9	0	213	4

== Honours ==
Arsenal

- U21 Premier League 2 play-offs: 2016

Individual

- Eredivisie Team of the Month: March 2022,
