= Bernabé Barragán =

Spanish footballer

Personal information
- Full name: Bernabé Barragán Maestre
- Date of birth: 18 February 1993 (age 33)
- Place of birth: Los Palacios, Spain
- Height: 1.89 m (6 ft 2 in)
- Position: Goalkeeper

Team information
- Current team: Juventud Torremolinos
- Number: 13

Youth career
- La Liara
- 2006–2012: Betis

Senior career*
Years	Team	Apps	(Gls)
2011–2013	Betis B	11	(0)
2013–2017	Atlético Madrid B	74	(0)
2017–2020	Gimnàstic	53	(0)
2020–2024	Albacete	86	(0)
2024–2025	Athens Kallithea	20	(0)
2026–	Juventud Torremolinos	8	(0)
- * Club domestic league appearances and goals as of 1 June 2026

Bernabé Barragán Maestre (born 18 February 1993), known as Bernabé Barragán simply as Bernabé, is a Spanish professional footballer who plays as a goalkeeper for Primera Federación club Juventud Torremolinos.

== Club career ==
Born in Los Palacios y Villafranca, Seville, Andalusia, Bernabé was a Real Betis youth graduate. On 5 November 2011, due to the injuries of Adrián and Antonio Ayala, he made his senior debut with the reserves by starting in a 0–3 Segunda División B away loss against Sporting Villanueva Promesas.

In July 2013 Bernabé moved to another reserve team, Atlético Madrid B also in the third division. Mainly a backup to Bono and David Gil, he only became a starter during the 2015–16 campaign, with his side now in Tercera División.

On 5 July 2017, Bernabé left Atleti, despite training regularly with the main squad since October 2014. On 20 July, he signed a three-year contract with Segunda División side Gimnàstic de Tarragona, mainly as a replacement to departing Manolo Reina.

On 7 October 2017 Bernabé made his professional debut by starting, committing a penalty and being replaced by José Perales after being injured in a 0–2 away loss against CD Tenerife. Midway through the 2018–19 season, he became the club's first choice under manager Enrique Martín, overtaking new signing Isaac Becerra.

On 1 June 2020, Bernabé terminated his contract with Nàstic, and stayed for four years with Albacete Balompié in the second division on 15 August. In 2024, he moved to Athens Kallithea.

== Career statistics ==
Appearances and goals by club, season and competition
Club	Season	League			National cup		Europe		Other		Total	
Club	Season	Division	Apps	Goals	Apps	Goals	Apps	Goals	Apps	Goals	Apps	Goals
Betis B	2011–12	Segunda División B	3	0	—		—		—		3	0
Betis B	2012–13	Segunda División B	8	0	—		—		—		8	0
Betis B	Total		11	0	—		—		—		11	0
Atlético Madrid B	2013–14	Segunda División B	2	0	—		—		0	0	2	0
Atlético Madrid B	2014–15	Segunda División B	16	0	—		—		—		16	0
Atlético Madrid B	2015–16	Tercera División	36	0	—		—		—		36	0
Atlético Madrid B	2016–17	Tercera Division	20	0	—		—		—		20	0
Atlético Madrid B	Total		74	0	—		—		0	0	74	0
Atlético Madrid	2014–15	La Liga	0	0	—		0	0	—		0	0
Atlético Madrid	2016–17	La Liga	0	0	0	0	0	0	—		0	0
Atlético Madrid	Total		0	0	0	0	0	0	—		0	0
Gimnàstic	2017–18	Segunda División	2	0	0	0	—		—		2	0
Gimnàstic	2018–19	Segunda División	23	0	2	0	—		—		25	0
Gimnàstic	2019–20	Segunda División B	28	0	0	0	—		0	0	28	0
Gimnàstic	Total		53	0	2	0	—		0	0	55	0
Albacete	2020–21	Segunda División	6	0	1	0	—		—		7	0
Albacete	2021–22	Primera División RFEF	25	0	0	0	—		2	0	27	0
Albacete	2022–23	Segunda División	30	0	0	0	—		1	0	31	0
Albacete	2023–24	Segunda División	25	0	0	0	—		—		25	0
Albacete	Total		86	0	1	0	—		3	0	90	0
Athens Kallithea	2024–25	Super League Greece	20	0	0	0	—		—		20	0
Juventud Torremolinos	2025–26	Primera Federación	8	0	—		—		—		8	0
Career total			252	0	3	0	0	0	3	0	258	0
