= José Perales =

Spanish footballer (born 1993)

Personal information
- Full name: José Perales Nájera
- Date of birth: 25 May 1993 (age 33)
- Place of birth: Palma, Spain
- Height: 1.87 m (6 ft 2 in)
- Position: Goalkeeper

Team information
- Current team: Xerez Deportivo
- Number: 1

Youth career
- 2009–2010: Atlético Madrid

Senior career*
| Years | Team | Apps | (Gls) |
| 2010–2012 | Puertollano B | 38 | (0) |
| 2011 | Puertollano | 4 | (0) |
| 2012–2013 | Elche B | 5 | (0) |
| 2013–2014 | Constància | 21 | (0) |
| 2014–2015 | Atlético Baleares | 4 | (0) |
| 2015–2016 | Binissalem | 14 | (0) |
| 2016–2018 | Pobla Mafumet | 67 | (0) |
| 2017–2018 | Gimnàstic | 2 | (0) |
| 2018–2019 | Badalona | 5 | (0) |
| 2019–2020 | Dinamo Tbilisi | 35 | (0) |
| 2020–2023 | San Fernando | 88 | (0) |
| 2023–2024 | Alcoyano | 9 | (0) |
| 2024 | Atlético Paso | 9 | (0) |
| 2025 | Ibiza Islas Pitiusas | 12 | (0) |
| 2025– | Xerez Deportivo | 3 | (0) |
- * Club domestic league appearances and goals as of 28 September 2025

José Perales Nájera (born 25 May 1993) is a Spanish footballer who plays as a goalkeeper for Segunda Federación club Xerez Deportivo.

== Club career ==
Born in Palma de Mallorca, Balearic Islands, Perales was an Atlético Madrid youth graduate. On 19 July 2010, he joined CD Puertollano; initially assigned to the reserves in the regional leagues, he made his first-team debut on 6 March 2011 by coming on as a second-half substitute in a 3–1 Segunda División B away loss against Lucena CF.

In 2012, after spending the vast majority of his spell with the B side, Perales signed for another reserve team, Elche CF Ilicitano of Tercera División. He continued to compete in the third and fourth tiers in the following years, representing CE Constància, CD Atlético Baleares and CD Binissalem.

On 16 July 2016, Perales moved to Gimnàstic de Tarragona's farm team CF Pobla de Mafumet, being also the third choice of the main squad behind Manolo Reina and Stole Dimitrievski. After Reina's departure, he was definitely promoted to the first team, and renewed his contract until 2020 on 7 August 2017.

Perales made his professional debut on 2 September 2017, starting in a 0–4 home loss against Sporting de Gijón in the Segunda División. The following 13 June, having spent the season playing understudy to both Dimitrievski and Bernabé Barragán, he terminated his contract.

On 20 July 2018, Perales signed with third division club CF Badalona. The following 19 January, he moved abroad and agreed to a one-year deal at FC Dinamo Tbilisi.
