= Quesada, Spain =

Quesada
- Municipality
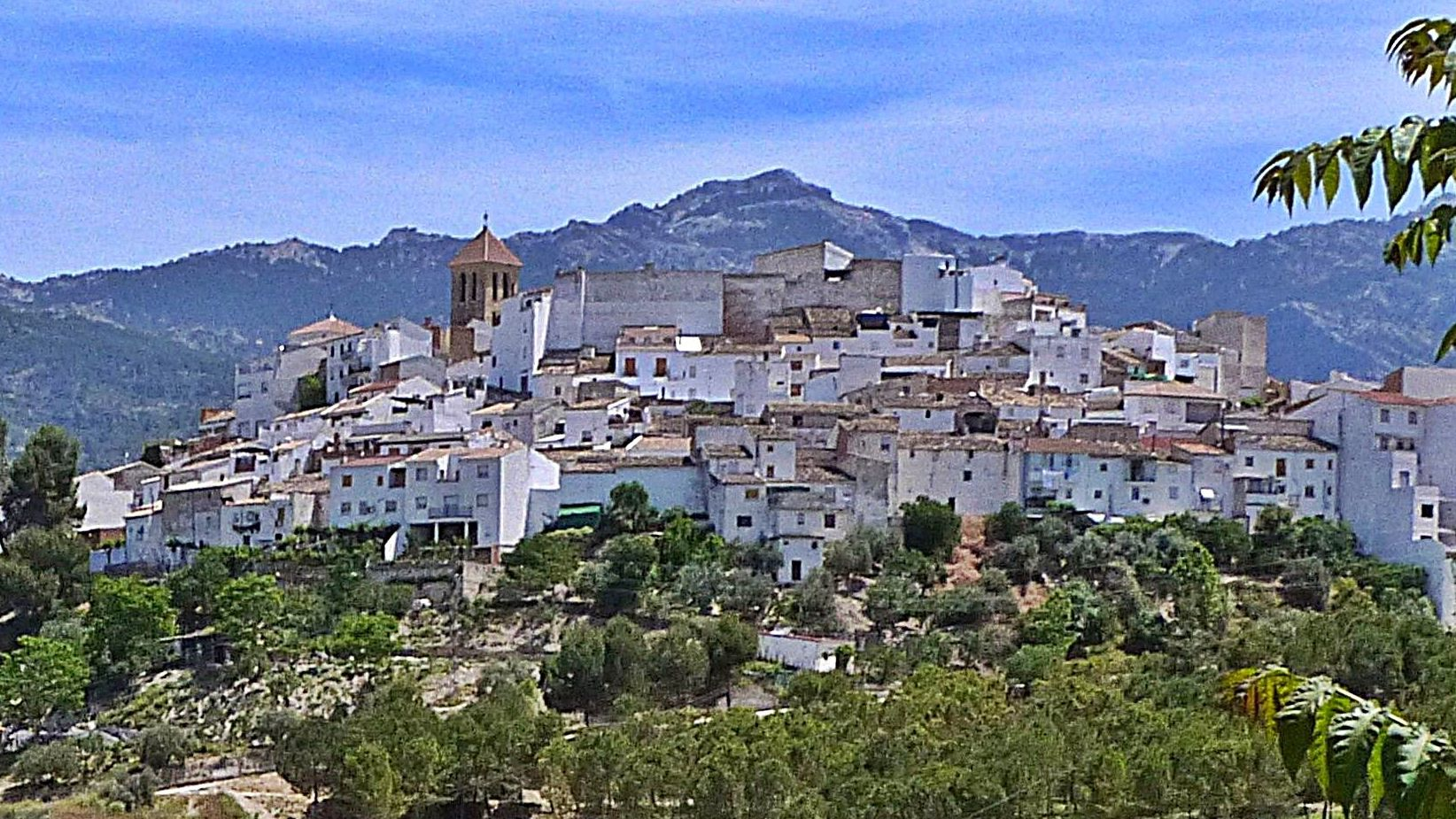

- Flag Coat of arms

- Location in the Province of Jaén Location in Spain
- Coordinates: 37°51′N 3°4′W
- Country: Spain
- Province: Jaén
- Comarca: Sierra de Cazorla

Government
  - Mayor: Manuel Vallejo Laso (PSOE)

Area
  - Total: 328.7 km^{2} (126.9 sq mi)
- Elevation: 676 m (2,218 ft)

Population (2025-01-01)
  - Total: 4,901
  - Density: 14.91/km^{2} (38.62/sq mi)
- Demonym: Quesadeños
- Time zone: UTC+1 (CET)
  - Summer (DST): UTC+2 (CEST)
- Postal code: 23480
- Website: www.quesada.es

Quesada is a Spanish municipality in the province of Jaén. It is in the Alto Guadalquivir comarca and its inhabitants are called quesadenses or quesadeños. It has an area of 328.7 km² and 5483 inhabitants according to the 2016 census. Its population has decreased in the last half of the twentieth century. In 1950, 12,224 quesadeños were registered.

The eastern and southern parts of its municipality are part of the Sierras de Cazorla, Segura y Las Villas Natural Park. The source of the Guadalquivir River is in its municipal district, in the Cañada de las Fuentes.

== Tourism ==
In its municipal area there are caves with rock art, although they are rarely visited, and the remains of a Bronze Age necropolis.

There are also the ruins of the Roman villa of Bruñel, which has some preserved mosaics, the most spectacular of which is dedicated to the goddess Thetis (others are exhibited in the Provincial Museum of Jaén). The villa is next to an early Christian basilica and is open to the public.

More recent is the "Watchtower of the Infante Don Enrique", dated 1314, above the port of Tíscar. It is open to the public and offers wide views.

Tíscar Castle, with a fragmentary tower, is next to the Water Cave, a natural cavern containing an impressive waterfall (except during times of drought). According to legend, the Virgin of Tíscar, patron saint of Quesada, appeared to the king of Tíscar, Mohamed Abdón, within the cave in the fourteenth century. At the foot of the castle, on a plateau, stands the sanctuary of the Virgin of Tíscar. It retains a primitive Gothic style door of the 14th century. Its interior contains an altar in Neo-Romanesque style made in painted terracotta by artists from Orea y Baños. There are rich gates of Granada from the 17th century, as well as votive lamps from the 18th century. The paintings from different eras of great masters are kept. The verses of Antonio Machado dedicated to the Virgin of Tíscar and the Sierra de Quesada are sculpted in the sanctuary square and on a stone slab. In turn, it was a tribute to the Sevillian poet that the town of Quesada honored him in 1957.

There is a building on Avenida de Almería where all the paintings by Rafael Zabaleta and his friends are available. Paintings from all periods of the painter are preserved, in a chronological way, and were donated by the heirs of Zabaleta to the town of Quesada. Currently, and since March 28, 2015, it houses the Miguel Hernández Museum and his wife Josefina Manresa.

== Economy ==
In agriculture, the olive grove dominates, being part of its olive cooperative (La Bética Aceitera) of the designation of origin "Sierra de Cazorla".

Cereal cultivation is now vestigial, as it has been replaced by olive groves.

== Holidays ==
From January 19 to January 21, the festival of San Sebastián is celebrated. Residents of Quesada wear flags, have drummers, and lights to shine on key areas of the town.

The two most important holidays, both dedicated to the Virgin of Tíscar, are held in August and in May. On the first Saturday of May, a pilgrimage occurs to bring the Virgin of Tíscar to its sanctuary. It is known as the "brought of the Virgin" day. During this trip, the Virgin of Tíscar crosses the town to the church, where she will remain until the end of August. During the trip, the quesadeños throw rose petals. On the mantle of the Virgin of Tíscar, they pin 50 or 100 euro bills as an offering.

The summer holiday begins on August 23 and ends on August 28. On the dawn of the 29th, the Quesada locals travel to the Virgin of Tíscar to bring it back to the town. They begin at the town and make their way to the sanctuary, which is 14 kilometres away. The locals travel on foot to the Humilladero cross at the exit of the town, where the quesadeños and people of the region say goodbye to Mary and Jesus. From there, the trip continues in a vehicle.

In the annex of Belerda, the Feast of the Charges or Feast of the God Boy is celebrated, a tradition that goes back to the 16th century reminiscent of the festival of Moors and Christians and currently, the clothes that carry the charges are old uniforms of the nineteenth century. The party starts on December 25. The five "Charges", the first and second captain, the flag bearer, the guidance, and the small charge, accompanied by the drummer and an enthusiastic entourage, depart on the 26th towards the Sanctuary of Tíscar where the image of the Virgin. During the return, from cortijada to cortijada, the products of the slaughter and the wine receive the entourage. On the 27th, with the renewal of the "Charges" of the coming year, this party ends.

== Gastronomy ==
The most unique dish is the talarines, a close relative of the Gazpacho manchego and the tatters, consisting of a stew of meat, vegetables, and mushrooms in which dough wafers are cooked that are broken into pieces (hence the name of tatters).

Pipirrana, crumbs, porridge, ajoharina, gachurreno, etc. are also prepared.

Some typical quesadeños sweets are: fig bread, papajotes, sweet gachillas, florets, drunkards, and bath donuts.

== Quesada people ==
- Rafael Zabaleta (1907-1960), painter.
- José Luis Verdes painter, although born in Madrid, was closely related to Quesada, where he sponsored a children's painting contest. One of the local schools is named after him.
- Rafael Hidalgo de Caviedes (Quesada 1864-Madrid 1950), a painter who was awarded several medals at the National Painting Exhibitions of the late nineteenth and early twentieth centuries.
- Josefina Manresa Marhuenda, wife of Miguel Hernández, born in Quesada on January 2, 1916, and died in Elche on February 19, 1987.
- Antonio Navarrete (Quesada, 1926-Granada, 2007), poet and writer.
- Cesáreo Rodríguez Aguilera, Magistrate, art critic, writer and senator in Cortes.
- Bienvenido Bayona Fernández (1915-2003), poet.

== See also ==
- Sierra de Cazorla
- Guadalquivir River
- List of municipalities in Jaén
