= Bruno Perone =

Brazilian footballer (born 1987)

Personal information
- Full name: Bruno Caldini Perone
- Date of birth: 6 July 1987 (age 39)
- Place of birth: São Paulo, Brazil
- Height: 1.92 m (6 ft 4 in)
- Position: Centre back

Team information
- Current team: San Cristóbal

Youth career
- São Paulo

Senior career*
Years	Team	Apps	(Gls)
2006–2007	Noroeste		
2007–2008	Corinthians Paranaense		
2008–2010	Figueirense	22	(1)
2010–2011	Tombense	0	(0)
2010	→ Mirassol (loan)	12	(0)
2010–2011	→ Xerez (loan)	8	(0)
2011–2012	Queens Park Rangers	5	(0)
2013	Linense	14	(1)
2013	Icasa	8	(0)
2014	Tombense	0	(0)
2014	ABC	0	(0)
2015	Novorizontino	18	(0)
2015	Kerala Blasters	10	(0)
2016	Wilmington Hammerheads	28	(8)
2017–2018	Gimnàstic	34	(2)
2018–2019	Zaragoza	19	(1)
2019–2020	→ Extremadura (loan)	1	(0)
2019–2020	Extremadura	0	(0)
2019–2020	→ Gimnàstic (loan)	15	(2)
2020	→ Hércules (loan)	7	(0)
2020–2021	Horta	8	(0)
2021	Prat	18	(0)
2021–2022	Costa Brava	19	(0)
2022–2023	Cerdanyola del Vallès	26	(1)
2023–2024	Olot	10	(2)
2024–	San Cristóbal	4	(0)
- * Club domestic league appearances and goals as of 29 September 2024

Bruno Caldini Perone (born 6 July 1987), or simply Bruno Perone, is a Brazilian footballer who plays as a central defender for Spanish club San Cristóbal.

== Career ==
Perone played eight Campeonato Brasileiro Série A games for Figueirense, having scored one goal.

On 11 August 2011, Perone joined Queens Park Rangers on a one-year deal. He made his debut for QPR on 23 August 2011 in a League Cup loss against Rochdale. Four days later, he made his Premier League debut playing the entire match against Wigan Athletic.

On 6 June 2012, it was announced that Perone had left Queens Park Rangers.

25 October 2012, Nottingham Forest manager Sean O'Driscoll announced a "mystery signing". News broke on social networking site Twitter that Perone was on trial with Nottingham Forest; however, nothing came of this trial period. In January 2013, he signed for Linense.

On 17 August 2015, he signed for Indian Super League franchise Kerala Blasters FC. The following 23 February, he joined United Soccer League side Wilmington Hammerheads.

On 7 January 2017, free agent Perone agreed to a six-month contract with Segunda División side Gimnàstic de Tarragona, after impressing on a trial basis. On 31 January of the following year, he signed a two-and-a-half-year contract with fellow league team Real Zaragoza, after cutting ties with Nàstic.

On 24 January 2019, Perone was loaned to Extremadura UD, still in the Spanish second division. After narrowly avoiding relegation, he signed a permanent two-year contract with the club due to an obligatory clause in the previous loan deal, but returned to Nàstic on loan on 8 August.

On 17 January 2020, Perone moved to fellow third division side Hércules CF on loan for the remainder of the campaign.
