= Girona FC B =

Association football club in Spain

Girona B
- Full name: Girona Futbol Club "B", S.A.D.
- Nicknames: Blanquivermells (White and Reds); Gironistes; Tossuts
- Founded: 1 January 2011; 15 years ago
- Stadium: Municipal de Riudarenes
- Capacity: 1,000
- President: Delfí Geli
- Head coach: Ángel Donato
- League: Segunda Federación – Group 2
- 2025–26: Segunda Federación – Group 3, 10th of 18
- Website: www.gironafc.cat/ca_ES/
Home colours	Away colours	Third colours

Girona Futbol Club "B", S.A.D. is a Spanish football team based in Girona, in the autonomous community of Catalonia. It is the reserve team of Girona FC and was founded in 2011, playing in the Segunda Federación – Group 2. The team plays home matches at Camp de Futbol Municipal de Riudarenes in Riudarenes.

== History ==
Founded in the summer of 2011 as Girona B, the club had its registration denied by the FCF in its first season, and was inscribed in Segona Catalana in 2012–13, taking the place of CF Riudellots.

In the team’s first senior season, Girona B achieved promotion to the Primera Catalana, after defeating CE El Cattlar. In 2016, after an agreement between Girona and CF Peralada was established, Girona B was demoted as the club's "C-team".

This new status was formalised on 23 July 2017, when the club was renamed Girona C as a result of CF Peralada's members approving a name change to CF Peralada-Girona B.

At the end of the 2018–19 season, Girona C finished second in their group of the Primera Catalana, missing out on promotion to the Tercera División only on a play-off game. At the same time, CF Peralada's affiliation with Girona ended as they were themselves relegated to the Tercera División, resulting in Girona C being restored to their original name of Girona B.

Girona B later achieved promotion to the fourth division in 2020, after finishing first in their group of the Primera Catalana.

== Season to season ==
Season	Tier	Division	Place
2012–13	6	2ª Cat.	2nd
2013–14	5	1ª Cat.	3rd
2014–15	5	1ª Cat.	8th
2015–16	5	1ª Cat.	14th
2016–17	5	1ª Cat.	13th
2017–18	6	2ª Cat.	1st
2018–19	5	1ª Cat.	2nd
2019–20	5	1ª Cat.	1st
2020–21	4	3ª	2nd / 4th
2021–22	5	3ª RFEF	4th
2022–23	5	3ª Fed.	8th
2023–24	5	3ª Fed.	11th
2024–25	5	3ª Fed.	3rd
2025–26	4	2ª Fed.	7th
2026–27	4	2ª Fed.	

- 2 seasons in Segunda Federación
- 1 season in Tercera División
- 4 seasons in Tercera División RFEF/Tercera Federación

== Current squad ==
As of 14 September 2026

Note: Flags indicate national team as defined under FIFA eligibility rules; some limited exceptions apply. Players may hold more than one non-FIFA nationality.

No.	Pos.	Nation	Player
1	GK	BUL	Aleksandar Andreev
3	DF	ESP	Biel Farrés
4	DF	ESP	Antonio Salguero
5	DF	ESP	Guillem Badia
6	MF	ESP	Aimar García
7	FW	VEN	Juan Arango
8	MF	ESP	Javi Sarasa
9	FW	ESP	Jakes Gorosabel
11	FW	MAR	Mohammed Hamony
13	GK	ESP	Jordi Danso
14	MF	ESP	Darío Frey
15	MF	GUI	Lass Kourouma
16	MF	ESP	Pol Trigueros

No.	Pos.	Nation	Player
18	MF	ESP	Joan Raventós
19	DF	ESP	Gibert Jordana
20	FW	ESP	Biel Carreras
21	MF	ESP	Ricard Artero
22	FW	ESP	Javi González
24	DF	ESP	Anartz Segurola
28	FW	SUI	Lou Marley
29	FW	ESP	Alex Cantarell
33	FW	MAR	Adam el Mokhles
—	DF	ESP	Mario González
—	DF	ESP	Pol Arnau
—	MF	ESP	Enric García

=== From Youth Academy ===
Note: Flags indicate national team as defined under FIFA eligibility rules; some limited exceptions apply. Players may hold more than one non-FIFA nationality.

No.	Pos.	Nation	Player
27	FW	ESP	Toni López
34	DF	ESP	Mamadou Cenlu Bah

=== Out on loan ===
Note: Flags indicate national team as defined under FIFA eligibility rules; some limited exceptions apply. Players may hold more than one non-FIFA nationality.

No.	Pos.	Nation	Player
—	DF	ESP	David Escoda (at Olot until 30 June 2027)
—	DF	ESP	Oriol Aguilera (at Badalona until 30 June 2027)

== Honours ==
- Segona Catalana

Winners (1): 2017–18

== Notable players ==
- Sebas Coris
- Gerard Gumbau
- David Juncà
- Carles Mas
- Gerard Muñoz
- Pere Pons

== See also ==
- Girona FC
- CF Riudellots
