= Carlos Blanco (footballer, born 1996) =

Spanish footballer

Personal information
- Full name: Carlos Blanco Moreno
- Date of birth: 1 June 1996 (age 30)
- Place of birth: Barcelona, Spain
- Height: 1.88 m (6 ft 2 in)
- Position: Centre back

Team information
- Current team: Sant Andreu
- Number: 4

Youth career
- 2002–2004: Cornellà
- 2004–2006: Espanyol
- 2006–2014: Barcelona
- 2014–2016: Juventus

Senior career*
Years	Team	Apps	(Gls)
2016–2017	Juventus	0	(0)
2016–2017	→ Lausanne (loan)	0	(0)
2016–2017	→ Team Vaud U21 (loan)	2	(0)
2017–2018	Gimnàstic	4	(0)
2018	→ Betis B (loan)	15	(0)
2018–2020	Villarreal B	44	(0)
2020–2021	Marbella	13	(2)
2021–2022	Alcoyano	20	(2)
2022–2023	Cornellà	21	(1)
2023–2024	San Fernando	27	(3)
2024–2025	Sestao River	12	(0)
2025	Alcoyano	6	(0)
2025–	Sant Andreu	30	(4)
- * Club domestic league appearances and goals as of 14 May 2026

Carlos Blanco Moreno (born 1 June 1996) is a Spanish footballer who plays for Sant Andreu as a central defender.

== Club career ==
Born in Barcelona, Catalonia, Blanco joined FC Barcelona's prolific youth setup in 2006, after representing UE Cornellà and RCD Espanyol. On 18 July 2014, after cutting ties with Barça, he joined Juventus FC on a free transfer.

On 30 August 2016, Blanco was loaned to Swiss Super League side FC Lausanne-Sport for one year, with Andi Zeqiri moving in the opposite direction. He made his senior debut on 16 September, starting in a 1–3 Swiss Cup away loss against FC Köniz; it was his maiden appearance for the club.

On 11 July 2017, Blanco signed a two-year contract with Segunda División club Gimnàstic de Tarragona. He made his professional debut on 5 September, starting in a 1–1 Copa del Rey home draw against CD Lugo (1–3 loss on penalties).

On 11 January 2018, Blanco was loaned to Betis Deportivo Balompié until June. On 10 July, he terminated his contract with Nàstic, and signed for Villarreal CF B two days later.

On 27 July 2024, Blanco joined Sestao River in the third tier.
