= Carlos García (footballer, born 1993) =

Spanish footballer

Personal information
- Full name: Carlos García Quesada
- Date of birth: 17 September 1993 (age 33)
- Place of birth: Seville, Spain
- Height: 1.65 m (5 ft 5 in)
- Position: Midfielder

Team information
- Current team: FCB Magpies
- Number: 8

Youth career
- 2001–2011: Betis

Senior career*
Years	Team	Apps	(Gls)
2011	Betis C	1	(0)
2011–2015	Betis B	113	(8)
2013	Betis	1	(0)
2015–2016	Pobla Mafumet	15	(0)
2016–2018	Gimnàstic	1	(0)
2016–2017	→ Sanluqueño (loan)	30	(2)
2017–2018	→ Logroñés (loan)	9	(0)
2018	→ Jumilla (loan)	15	(0)
2018–2020	Racing Ferrol	16	(0)
2020	→ Coria (loan)	7	(1)
2020–2021	Cabecense	24	(0)
2021–2022	Ciudad Lucena	32	(4)
2022–2023	Juventud Torremolinos	17	(0)
2023–	FCB Magpies	49	(9)

International career
2012	Spain U20	5	(0)
- * Club domestic league appearances and goals as of 4 May 2025

Carlos García Quesada (born 17 September 1993) is a Spanish footballer who plays as a central midfielder for Gibraltarian club FCB Magpies.

== Club career ==
Born in Seville, Andalusia, García graduated from local Real Betis' youth system, and made his senior debut in 2011 with the amateur C-team. Shortly after, he began appearing with the reserves in Segunda División B.

On 26 May 2013, García played his official match with the Andalusians' first team, coming on as a substitute for Rubén Pérez in the dying minutes of a 4–0 La Liga home win against Real Zaragoza. He only appeared for the B-side from then onwards, and terminated his contract on 17 November 2015.

On 15 December 2015, García signed a three-and-a-half-year deal with Gimnàstic de Tarragona, being initially assigned to farm team CF Pobla de Mafumet also in the third level. The following 31 August, shortly after being definitely promoted to the main squad, he was loaned to fellow league club Atlético Sanluqueño CF.

On 1 September 2017, García was loaned to division three's UD Logroñés for one year. The following 30 January, his loan was cut short and he moved to FC Jumilla of the same tier also in a temporary deal.

On 31 July 2018, García terminated his contract with Nàstic.
