= 2015–16 Gimnàstic de Tarragona season =

Gimnàstic de Tarragona
2015–16 season
- President: Josep María Andreu
- Manager: Vicente Moreno
- Segunda División: 3rd
- Copa del Rey: Third round
- Top goalscorer: League: Naranjo (15); All: Naranjo (16)
- Highest home attendance: 14,571 vs. Osasuna (25 May)
- Lowest home attendance: 4,247 vs. Elche (13 Feb)
Home colours	Away colours

The 2015–16 Gimnàstic de Tarragona's season was the 129th season in the club's existence and the first in Segunda División since being promoted from the third level of the Spanish football after defeating SD Huesca in the play-offs. Nàstic returned to the second tier after a three-year absence.

== Players ==
=== Squad ===
As of 18 June 2016

No.	Name	Position	Nat.	Place of birth	Date of birth (age)	Club caps	Club goals	Signed from	Date signed	Fee	Contract End
Goalkeepers
1	Manolo Reina	GK	(Spain) (Andalusia)	Trabuco	1 April 1985 (aged 31)	113	0	Atromitos (Greece)	30 June 2013	Free	30 June 2016
31	Alberto Varo	GK	(Spain) (Catalonia)	Tarragona	18 March 1993 (aged 23)	4	0	Pobla	28 February 2014	Free	30 June 2018
40	Fabrice Ondoa	GK	(Cameroon)	Yaoundé	24 December 1995 (aged 20)	–	–	Barcelona B	7 January 2015	Free	30 June 2019
Defenders
2	Gerard Valentín	RB	(Spain) (Catalonia)	Avinyonet	28 July 1993 (aged 22)	40	0	Olot	6 July 2014	Undisc.	30 June 2019
3	Mossa	LB/CB	(Spain) (Valencian Community)	Valencia	24 January 1989 (aged 27)	76	2	Levante B	7 July 2014	Free	30 June 2016
4	Xavi Molina	CB/DM	(Spain) (Catalonia)	La Canonja	19 July 1986 (aged 29)	105	7	Atlético Baleares	13 June 2013	Free	30 June 2016
5	Xisco Campos (c)	CB/RB	(Spain) (Balearic Islands)	Binissalem	10 March 1982 (aged 34)	200	7	Murcia	16 July 2010	Free	30 June 2017
17	Iago Bouzón	CB	(Spain) (Galicia (Spain))	Redondela	16 March 1983 (aged 33)	30	1	Córdoba	3 July 2015	Free	30 June 2017
18	Daisuke Suzuki	CB	(Japan)	Tokyo	29 January 1990 (aged 26)	15	0	Kashiwa Reysol (Japan)	16 February 2016	Free	30 June 2016
22	Pablo Marí	CB	(Spain) (Valencian Community)	Valencia	31 August 1993 (aged 22)	96	6	Mallorca B	2 September 2013	Free	30 June 2018
27	Jordi Calavera	RB	(Spain) (Catalonia)	Valls	2 August 1995 (aged 20)	23	1	Youth System	1 July 2013	Free	30 June 2016
32	Marc Vadillo	CB	(Spain) (Catalonia)	Tarragona	15 March 1994 (aged 22)	–	–	Pobla	14 October 2015	Free	30 June 2016
Midfielders
6	Manolo Martínez	DM/CB	(Spain) (Valencian Community)	Bigastro	15 June 1980 (aged 36)	120	4	Levadiakos (Greece)	6 August 2014	Free	30 June 2017
11	Cristian Lobato	LW/RW	(Spain) (Catalonia)	Esparreguera	7 March 1989 (aged 27)	20	1	Asteras Tripolis (Greece)	26 November 2015	Free	30 June 2016
12	Jean Luc	RW/LW	(Ivory Coast)	Lakota	8 August 1992 (aged 23)	74	8	Villarreal B	13 July 2013	Free	30 June 2017
14	Juan Muñiz	LW/RW	(Spain) (Asturias)	Gijón	14 March 1992 (aged 24)	15	1	Sporting Gijón	8 January 2016	Free	30 June 2018
15	Giorgi Aburjania	CM	(Georgia (country))	Tbilisi	2 January 1995 (aged 21)	16	2	Anorthosis (Cyprus)	8 January 2016	Free	30 June 2018
19	Miguel Palanca	RW/SS	(Spain) (Catalonia)	Tarragona	18 December 1987 (aged 28)	20	3	Adelaide United (Australia)	8 July 2015	Free	30 June 2016
23	Sergio Tejera	CM/AM	(Spain) (Catalonia)	Barcelona	28 May 1990 (aged 26)	37	0	Espanyol	8 July 2015	Free	30 June 2017
24	Lévy Madinda	CM	(Gabon)	Libreville	11 June 1992 (aged 24)	22	1	Celta	19 January 2015	Loan	30 June 2016
25	Achille Emaná	AM/CM	(Cameroon)	Yaoundé	5 June 1982 (aged 34)	41	9	Cruz Azul (Mexico)	1 August 2015	Free	30 June 2016
29	Víctor García	RW/LW	(Spain) (Valencian Community)	Requena	31 May 1994 (aged 22)	–	–	Tenerife	23 July 2015	Loan	30 June 2016
34	Carlos García	CM	(Spain) (Andalusia)	Seville	17 September 1993 (aged 22)	1	0	Betis B	15 December 2015	Free	30 June 2018
Forwards
7	Xisco Muñoz	RW/LW/SS	(Spain) (Balearic Islands)	Manacor	5 September 1980 (aged 35)	26	2	Dinamo Tbilisi (Georgia (country))	14 December 2014	Free	30 June 2016
9	Álex López	ST	(Spain) (Catalonia)	Calafell	18 September 1993 (aged 22)	16	3	Valencia B	26 July 2015	Undisc.	30 June 2019
10	Rayco	ST	(Spain) (Canary Islands)	Las Palmas	23 March 1987 (aged 29)	52	15	Alcoyano	16 July 2014	Free	30 June 2016
16	Aníbal Zurdo	ST	(Mexico)	Villahermosa	3 December 1982 (aged 33)	14	2	Cruz Azul (Mexico)	15 January 2016	Free	30 June 2016
20	Marcos de La Espada	ST	(Spain) (Mallorca)	Pollença	3 November 1985 (aged 30)	142	42	Sant Andreu	26 June 2012	Free	30 June 2016
21	Ferrán Giner	SS/LB/LW	(Spain) (Valencian Community)	Alboraya	27 September 1988 (aged 27)	79	3	Olímpic	25 June 2013	Free	30 June 2016
28	José Naranjo	SS/LW	(Spain) (Andalusia)	Rociana	28 July 1994 (aged 21)	38	16	Recreativo	7 July 2015	Free	30 June 2018
30	Stephane Emaná	ST	(Cameroon)	Yaoundé	17 June 1994 (aged 22)	6	2	Pobla	15 March 2014	Free	30 June 2019

=== Technical staff ===
Position	Staff
Head coach	Vicente Moreno
Assistant manager	Nano
Doctor	Carles Hernàndez
Physio	Ernest Canete
Match delegate	José Maria Grau
Equipment man	Guillermo Martín

=== Transfers ===
==== In ====
No.	Pos.	Nat.	Name	Age	EU	Moving from	Type	Transfer window	Ends	Transfer fee	Source
27	DF	(Spain)	Jordi Calavera	19	EU	Olot	Loan Return	Summer	2016	Free	
—	FW	(Spain)	Iván Aguilar	24	EU	San Roque de Lepe	Loan Return	Summer	2016	Free	
24	MF	(Spain)	Xisco Hernández	25	EU	Reus	Transfer	Summer	2017	Free	
17	DF	(Spain)	Iago Bouzón	32	EU	Córdoba	Transfer	Summer	2017	Free	
16	DF	(Spain)	Moussa Bandeh	23	EU	Olot	Transfer	Summer	2017	€70K	
26	MF	(Spain)	Fali	21	EU	Huracán Valencia	Transfer	Summer	2017	Free	
28	FW	(Spain)	José Naranjo	20	EU	Recreativo Huelva	Transfer	Summer	2018	Free	
23	MF	(Spain)	Sergio Tejera	25	EU	Espanyol	Transfer	Summer	2017	Free	
19	MF	(Spain)	Miguel Palanca	27	EU	Adelaide United (Australia)	Transfer	Summer	2016	Free	
18	MF	(Israel)	Gal Arel	26	EU	Hapoel Petah Tikva (Israel)	Trial	Summer	2015	Free	
25	MF	(Cameroon)	Achille Emaná	33	EU	Cruz Azul (Mexico)	Trial	Summer	2015	Free	
9	FW	(Spain)	Álex López	21	EU	Valencia Mestalla	Transfer	Summer	2019	Undisclosed	
18	MF	(Israel)	Gal Arel	26	EU	Hapoel Petah Tikva (Israel)	Transfer	Summer	2017	Free	
25	MF	(Cameroon)	Achille Emaná	33	EU	Cruz Azul (Mexico)	Transfer	Summer	2016	Free	
11	MF	(Spain)	Cristian Lobato	26	EU	Asteras Tripolis (Greece)	Transfer	Winter	2016	Free	
40	GK	(Cameroon)	Fabrice Ondoa	20	EU	Barcelona B	Transfer	Winter	2019	Free	
15	MF	(Georgia (country))	Giorgi Aburjania	21	EU	Anorthosis Famagusta (Cyprus)	Transfer	Winter	2018	Free	
14	MF	(Spain)	Juan Muñiz	23	EU	Sporting Gijón	Transfer	Winter	2018	Free	
24	FW	(Mexico)	Aníbal Zurdo	33	EU	Cruz Azul (Mexico)	Transfer	Winter	2016	Free	
15	MF	(Gabon)	Lévy Madinda	23	EU	Celta Vigo	Loan	Winter	2016	Free	
18	DF	(Japan)	Daisuke Suzuki	26	EU	Kashiwa Reysol (Japan)	Transfer	During season	2016	Free	

Total spending: ▼€70,000

==== Out ====
No.	Pos.	Nat.	Name	Age	EU	Moving to	Type	Transfer window	Transfer fee	Source
—	MF	(Spain)	Cristóbal	23	EU	Almería	Loan Return	Summer	Free	
—	MF	(Spain)	Sergio Rodríguez	22	EU	Betis	Loan Return	Summer	Free	
—	FW	(Ivory Coast)	Lago Junior	24	EU	Mirandés	Contract Ended	Summer	Free	
—	FW	(Spain)	Iván Aguilar	24	EU	UCAM Murcia	Loan	Summer	Free	
14	MF	(Spain)	Marc Martínez	29	EU	Lleida Esportiu	Rescinded	Summer	Free	
15	DF	(Spain)	Pol Bueso	30	EU	Free agent	Rescinded	Summer	Free	
9	FW	(Spain)	Gorka Azkorra	32	EU	Murcia	Rescinded	Summer	Free	
11	MF	(Spain)	Luismi	32	EU	Free agent	Rescinded	Summer	Free	
26	MF	(Spain)	Fali	22	EU	Barcelona B	Loan	Winter	Free	
24	MF	(Spain)	Xisco Hernández	26	EU	Atlético Baleares	Loan	Winter	Free	
16	DF	(Spain)	Moussa Bandeh	24	EU	Olot	Loan	Winter	Free	
8	MF	(Spain)	David Rocha	30	EU	Houston Dynamo (United States)	Transfer	Winter	Undisclosed	
13	GK	(Spain)	Tomeu Nadal	26	EU	Free agent	Rescinded	Winter	Free	
18	MF	(Israel)	Gal Arel	26	EU	Free agent	Rescinded	Winter	Free	

Total gaining: ▲€0

Balance

Total: ▼€70,000

=== Contracts ===
No.	Pos.	Nat.	Name	Age	Status	Contract length	Expiry date	Source
8	MF	(Spain)	David Rocha	30	Signed	3 years	June 2018	Gimnàstic
—		(Spain)	Vicente Moreno	40	Signed	1 year	June 2016	Gimnàstic
5	DF	(Spain)	Xisco Campos	33	Signed	2 years	June 2017	Gimnàstic
22	DF	(Spain)	Pablo Marí	21	Signed	3 years	June 2018	Gimnàstic
1	GK	(Spain)	Manolo Reina	30	Signed	1 year	June 2016	Diari de Tarragona
20	FW	(Spain)	Marcos de La Espada	29	Signed	1 year	June 2016	Diari de Tarragona
6	MF	(Spain)	Manolo Martínez	35	Signed	2 years	June 2017	Gimnàstic
12	MF	(Ivory Coast)	Jean Luc	22	Signed	2 years	June 2017	Diari de Tarragona
11	MF	(Spain)	Luismi	31	Signed	1 year	June 2016	Gimnàstic
9	FW	(Spain)	Gorka Azkorra	32	Signed	1 year	June 2016	Gimnàstic
2	DF	(Spain)	Gerard Valentín	22	Signed	3 years	June 2019	Gimnàstic

== Player statistics ==
=== Squad Stats ===
As of 18 June 2016

No.	Pos	Nat	Player	Total		Segunda División		Copa del Rey		Play-offs	
No.	Pos	Nat	Player	Apps	Goals	Apps	Goals	Apps	Goals	Apps	Goals
1	GK	(Spain) ESP	Manolo Reina	43	0	41	0	0	0	2	0
2	DF	(Spain) ESP	Gerard Valentín	14	0	10+2	0	0	0	2	0
3	DF	(Spain) ESP	Mossa	41	2	38	2	1	0	2	0
4	DF	(Spain) ESP	Xavi Molina	35	3	31+2	3	0	0	2	0
5	DF	(Spain) ESP	Xisco Campos	24	0	20+3	0	1	0	0	0
6	MF	(Spain) ESP	Manolo Martínez	7	0	3+2	0	2	0	0	0
7	FW	(Spain) ESP	Xisco Muñoz	13	1	1+11	1	1	0	0	0
9	FW	(Spain) ESP	Álex López	16	3	9+4	2	0+1	1	1+1	0
10	FW	(Spain) ESP	Rayco	15	0	10+4	0	1	0	0	0
11	MF	(Spain) ESP	Cristian Lobato	20	1	12+6	1	0	0	2	0
12	MF	(Ivory Coast) CIV	Jean Luc	36	6	23+10	5	0+1	0	0+2	1
14	MF	(Spain) ESP	Juan Muñiz	15	1	5+8	0	0	0	1+1	1
15	MF	(Georgia (country)) GEO	Giorgi Aburjania	16	2	15+1	2	0	0	0	0
16	FW	(Mexico) MEX	Aníbal Zurdo	14	2	9+5	2	0	0	0	0
17	DF	(Spain) ESP	Iago Bouzón	30	1	27+2	1	1	0	0	0
18	DF	(Japan) JPN	Daisuke Suzuki	15	0	13	0	0	0	2	0
19	MF	(Spain) ESP	Miguel Palanca	20	3	11+8	1	1	2	0	0
20	FW	(Spain) ESP	Marcos de la Espada	25	4	11+12	4	0+1	0	0+1	0
21	FW	(Spain) ESP	Ferrán Giner	19	0	9+8	0	1	0	0+1	0
22	DF	(Spain) ESP	Pablo Marí	25	1	25	1	0	0	0	0
23	MF	(Spain) ESP	Sergio Tejera	37	0	29+5	0	1	0	2	0
24	MF	(Gabon) GAB	Lévy Madinda	22	1	15+5	1	0	0	2	0
25	MF	(Cameroon) CMR	Achille Emaná	41	9	31+6	9	1+1	0	2	0
27	DF	(Spain) ESP	Jordi Calavera	11	1	7+2	1	2	0	0	0
28	FW	(Spain) ESP	Naranjo	38	16	27+7	15	1+1	0	2	1
29	MF	(Spain) ESP	Víctor García	0	0	0	0	0	0	0	0
30	FW	(Cameroon) CMR	Stephane Emaná	5	2	0+5	2	0	0	0	0
31	GK	(Spain) ESP	Alberto Varo	1	0	1	0	0	0	0	0
32	DF	(Spain) ESP	Marc Vadillo	0	0	0	0	0	0	0	0
34	MF	(Spain) ESP	Carlos García	1	0	0+1	0	0	0	0	0
40	GK	(Cameroon) CMR	Fabrice Ondoa	0	0	0	0	0	0	0	0
Players on loan to other clubs:
16	DF	(Spain) ESP	Moussa Bandeh	4	0	3	0	1	0	0	0
24	MF	(Spain) ESP	Xisco Hernández	3	0	0+1	0	2	0	0	0
26	MF	(Spain) ESP	Fali	8	1	4+3	1	1	0	0	0
Players who have left the club after the start of the season:
8	MF	(Spain) ESP	David Rocha	21	0	20	0	0+1	0	0	0
11	MF	(Spain) ESP	Luismi	0	0	0	0	0	0	0	0
13	GK	(Spain) ESP	Tomeu Nadal	2	0	0	0	2	0	0	0
18	MF	(Israel) ISR	Gal Arel	6	0	1+3	0	2	0	0	0

=== Top scorers ===
Place	Number	Position	Nation	Name	Segunda División	Copa del Rey	Play-offs	Total
1	28	FW	(Spain)	Naranjo	15	0	1	15
2	25	MF	(Cameroon)	Achille Emaná	9	0	0	9
3	12	MF	(Ivory Coast)	Jean Luc	5	0	1	6
4	20	FW	(Spain)	Marcos de la Espada	4	0	0	4
5	4	DF	(Spain)	Xavi Molina	3	0	0	3
5	9	FW	(Spain)	Álex López	2	1	0	3
5	19	MF	(Spain)	Miguel Palanca	1	2	0	3
6	3	DF	(Spain)	Mossa	2	0	0	2
6	15	MF	(Georgia (country))	Giorgi Aburjania	2	0	0	2
6	16	FW	(Mexico)	Aníbal Zurdo	2	0	0	2
6	30	FW	(Cameroon)	Stephane Emaná	2	0	0	2
7	11	MF	(Spain)	Cristian Lobato	1	0	0	1
7	7	FW	(Spain)	Xisco Muñoz	1	0	0	1
7	17	DF	(Spain)	Iago Bouzón	1	0	0	1
7	22	DF	(Spain)	Pablo Marí	1	0	0	1
7	24	MF	(Gabon)	Lévy Madinda	1	0	0	1
7	26	MF	(Spain)	Fali	1	0	0	1
7	27	DF	(Spain)	Jordi Calavera	1	0	0	1
7	14	MF	(Spain)	Juan Muñiz	0	0	1	1
	Own goals				3	0	0	3
TOTALS					57	3	3	63

=== Disciplinary record ===
Number	Nation	Position	Name	Segunda División		Copa del Rey		Play-offs		Total	
Number	Nation	Position	Name	Yellow card	Red card	Yellow card	Red card	Yellow card	Red card	Yellow card	Red card
23	(Spain)	MF	Sergio Tejera	18	0	0	0	1	0	19	0
3	(Spain)	DF	Mossa	11	0	1	0	1	0	13	0
17	(Spain)	DF	Iago Bouzón	10	0	0	0	1	0	11	0
25	(Cameroon)	MF	Achille Emaná	9	0	1	0	0	0	10	0
12	(Ivory Coast)	MF	Jean Luc	9	0	0	0	0	0	9	0
28	(Spain)	FW	Naranjo	9	0	0	0	0	0	9	0
22	(Spain)	DF	Pablo Marí	7	1	0	0	0	0	7	1
1	(Spain)	GK	Manolo Reina	7	0	0	0	0	0	7	0
8	(Spain)	MF	David Rocha	7	0	0	0	0	0	7	0
4	(Spain)	DF	Xavi Molina	6	0	0	0	1	0	7	0
5	(Spain)	DF	Xisco Campos	6	0	0	0	0	0	6	0
14	(Spain)	MF	Juan Muñiz	4	0	0	0	1	0	5	0
24	(Gabon)	MF	Lévy Madinda	3	0	0	0	2	0	5	0
6	(Spain)	MF	Manolo Martínez	3	1	1	0	0	0	4	1
19	(Spain)	MF	Miguel Palanca	4	0	0	0	0	0	4	0
2	(Spain)	DF	Gerard Valentín	2	0	0	0	2	0	4	0
15	(Georgia (country))	MF	Giorgi Aburjania	3	0	0	0	0	0	3	0
26	(Spain)	MF	Fali	2	0	1	0	0	0	3	0
7	(Spain)	FW	Xisco Muñoz	2	0	0	0	0	0	2	0
16	(Mexico)	FW	Aníbal Zurdo	2	0	0	0	0	0	2	0
18	(Japan)	DF	Daisuke Suzuki	2	0	0	0	0	0	2	0
21	(Spain)	FW	Ferrán Giner	2	0	0	0	0	0	2	0
27	(Spain)	DF	Jordi Calavera	2	0	0	0	0	0	2	0
30	(Cameroon)	FW	Stephane Emaná	2	0	0	0	0	0	2	0
9	(Spain)	FW	Álex López	1	0	0	0	0	0	1	0
11	(Spain)	MF	Cristian Lobato	1	0	0	0	0	0	1	0
20	(Spain)	FW	Marcos de la Espada	1	0	0	0	0	0	1	0
18	(Israel)	MF	Gal Arel	0	0	1	0	0	0	1	0
TOTALS				130	2	5	0	9	0	144	2

== Competitions ==
=== Pre-season/Friendlies ===
22 July 2015	Gimnàstic	1–1	Villarreal	Tarragona
20:30	Marcos 49'	Report	70' Trigueros	Stadium: Nou Estadi; Attendance: 3,235; Referee: Medie Jiménez

25 July 2015	Gimnàstic	3–0	Cornellà	Salou
19:30	Giner 17'; Xisco Muñoz 33'; Marcos 37'	Report		Stadium: Complex Esportiu Futbol Salou; Referee: Subirats Matamoros

28 July 2015	Ascó	0–1	Gimnàstic	Ascó
19:45		Report	90' Rayco	Stadium: Campo Municipal de Ascó; Referee: Picazo Hernández

30 July 2015	Valencia Mestalla	1–3	Gimnàstic	Valencia
19:30	Nacho Gil 47'	Report	13' Marcos; 44' Emaná; 73' Tejera	Stadium: Paterna; Referee: Mena Gimeno

1 August 2015	Gimnàstic	2–2	Zaragoza	Tarragona
20:30	Giner 8'; Rayco 50'	Report	85' Dorca; 86' Ángel	Stadium: Nou Estadi; Attendance: 3,018; Referee: Romero Freixes

9 August 2015	Sabadell	0–0	Gimnàstic	Sabadell
20:30		Report		Stadium: Nova Creu Alta

16 August 2015	Olot	1–1	Gimnàstic	Olot
19:30	Marcel 65'	Report	4' Emaná	Stadium: Municipal; Attendance: 920; Referee: Oscar Sauleda

=== Copa Catalunya ===
31 July 2015 1	Vilafranca	2–1	Gimnàstic	Vilafranca del Penedès
20:30	Sergi Moreno 84'; Bueno 89'	Report	20' Marc Martínez	Stadium: Municipal; Referee: Calle Martínez

=== Segunda División ===
Pos	Team	Pld	W	D	L	GF	GA	GD	Pts	Promotion, qualification or relegation
1	Alavés (C, P)	42	21	12	9	49	35	+14	75	Promotion to La Liga
2	Leganés (P)	42	20	14	8	59	34	+25	74	Promotion to La Liga
3	Gimnàstic	42	18	17	7	57	41	+16	71	Qualification to promotion play-offs
4	Girona	42	17	15	10	46	28	+18	66	Qualification to promotion play-offs
5	Córdoba	42	19	8	15	59	52	+7	65	Qualification to promotion play-offs

Source: LFP
Rules for classification: 1) points; 2) head-to-head points; 3) head-to-head goal difference; 4) goal difference; 5) number of goals scored
(C) Champions; (P) Promoted

==== Results summary ====
Overall								Home						Away					
Pld	W	D	L	GF	GA	GD	Pts	W	D	L	GF	GA	GD	W	D	L	GF	GA	GD
42	18	17	7	57	41	+16	71	11	8	2	31	20	+11	7	9	5	26	21	+5

Last updated: 4 June 2016.
Source: Competitive matches

==== Results by round ====
Round	1	2	3	4	5	6	7	8	9	10	11	12	13	14	15	16	17	18	19	20	21	22	23	24	25	26	27	28	29	30	31	32	33	34	35	36	37	38	39	40	41	42
Ground	H	A	H	A	H	A	H	A	H	A	A	H	A	H	H	A	A	H	A	H	A	A	H	A	H	A	H	A	H	A	H	H	A	H	A	H	A	H	A	H	A	H
Result	D	W	W	L	W	D	L	D	W	D	L	W	L	W	W	D	L	W	D	L	W	D	W	D	W	D	D	D	D	W	W	D	L	D	D	W	W	D	W	W	W	D
Position	9	4	2	6	3	3	5	9	5	6	8	4	9	7	3	5	7	5	6	7	7	7	6	7	4	5	4	5	7	3	3	3	4	4	4	3	3	3	3	3	3	3

Updated to match(es) played on 4 June 2016. Source:
A = Away; H = Home; W = Win; D = Draw; L = Loss

==== Matches ====
23 August 2015 1	Gimnàstic	2–2	Albacete	Tarragona
20:30	Marí (yellow card) 8'; Rocha (yellow card) 54'; Manolo Martínez (red card) 64'; Xavi Molina 87'; Emaná (yellow card) 87'; Marcos 90+5' (pen.)	Report	(yellow card) 21' Paredes; (yellow card) 34' Miguel Núñez; 59' Edu Ramos; (yellow card) 70' Cidoncha; 84' (pen.) Rubén Cruz; (yellow card) 90+5' Pulido; (yellow card) 90+5' Juan Carlos	Stadium: Nou Estadi; Attendance: 4,843; Referee: Eiriz Mata

30 August 2015 2	Tenerife	1–2	Gimnàstic	Santa Cruz de Tenerife
20:30	Lozano 49'; Sanz (yellow card) 52'; Cristian (yellow card) 71'; Germán (yellow card) 73'; Carlos Ruiz (yellow card) 90'; Cámara (yellow card) 90+3'	Report	(yellow card) 27' Mossa; (yellow card) 32' Rocha; (yellow card) 34' Tejera; 66' Pablo Marí; 85' Jean Luc	Stadium: Heliodoro Rodríguez López; Attendance: 9,174; Referee: José Luis Munuera Montero

5 September 2015 3	Gimnàstic	1–0	Girona	Tarragona
18:00	Jean Luc (yellow card) 9' (goal) 61'; Fali (yellow card) 28'	Report	(yellow card) 73' Pere Pons	Stadium: Nou Estadi; Attendance: 5,823; Referee: Piñeiro Crespo

12 September 2015 4	Elche	1–0	Gimnàstic	Elche
18:00	Sergio León 42'; Nono (yellow card) 78'	Report	(yellow card) 76' Tejera	Stadium: Manuel Martínez Valero; Attendance: 9,055; Referee: Alberola Rojas

20 September 2015 5	Gimnàstic	1–0	Mallorca	Tarragona
17:00	Marcos 41'; Rocha (yellow card) 51'; Bouzón (yellow card) 75'; Manolo Martínez (yellow card) 87'	Report	(yellow card) 28' Aveldaño; (yellow card) 61' Bianchi; (yellow card) 66' Yuste	Stadium: Nou Estadi; Attendance: 6,020; Referee: Ais Reig

27 September 2015 6	Valladolid	0–0	Gimnàstic	Valladolid
17:00	Mojica (yellow card) 68'	Report	(yellow card) 5' Xisco Campos; (yellow card) 84' Rocha; (yellow card) 88' Manolo Reina; (yellow card) 90' Achille Emaná	Stadium: José Zorrilla; Attendance: 9,026; Referee: Valentín Pizarro

3 October 2015 7	Gimnàstic	0–2	Alcorcón	Tarragona
18:00	Pablo Marí (yellow card) 34'; Marcos (yellow card) 51'; Iago Bouzón (yellow card) 53'; Tejera (yellow card) 82'	Report	49' Óscar Plano; (yellow card) 53' Djené; 61' David Rodríguez; (yellow card) 67' Campaña	Stadium: Nou Estadi; Attendance: 4,532; Referee: Víctor Areces

10 October 2015 8	Ponferradina	2–2	Gimnàstic	Ponferrada
18:00	Baró (yellow card) 31'; Yuri 57' (pen.); Basha 77'	Report	(yellow card) 24' Xavi Molina; (yellow card) 55' Mossa; (yellow card) 67' Naranjo; 77' Xisco Muñoz; 81' Álex López	Stadium: El Toralín; Attendance: 4,176; Referee: David Pérez

17 October 2015 9	Gimnàstic	2–1	Bilbao Athletic	Tarragona
17:00	Calavera 30'; Xavi Molina (yellow card) 56'; Jean Luc 64' (yellow card) 71'; Xisco Muñoz (yellow card) 89'	Report	(penalty missed) 4' 48' Guarrotxena; (yellow card) 20' Córdoba; (yellow card) 29' Vesga	Stadium: Nou Estadi; Attendance: 5,565; Referee: Juan López

25 October 2015 10	Numancia	1–1	Gimnàstic	Soria
17:00	Iñigo Pérez (yellow card) 49'; Álex Alegría 73'; Juanma (yellow card) 90+2'	Report	(yellow card) 18' Naranjo; (yellow card) 51' Jean Luc; (yellow card) 81' Calavera; 90+3' (pen.) Marcos	Stadium: Los Pajaritos; Attendance: 2,817; Referee: Gorka Sagues

31 October 2015 11	Córdoba	2–0	Gimnàstic	Córdoba
18:00	Fidel 6'; Andone 37'; Stankevičius (yellow card) 56'; Razak (yellow card) 85'	Report	(yellow card) 35' Rocha; (yellow card) 45+1' Mossa; (yellow card) 89' Calavera; (yellow card) 90+3' Tejera	Stadium: Nuevo Arcángel; Attendance: 14,833; Referee: José Piñeiro

8 November 2015 12	Gimnàstic	2–0	Huesca	Tarragona
17:00	Tejera (yellow card) 6'; Jean Luc (yellow card) 9' (goal) 45'; Emaná 23' (yellow card) 39'; Xisco Campos (yellow card) 35'		(yellow card) 72' Mérida; (yellow card) 90+2' Machís	Stadium: Nou Estadi; Attendance: 5,047; Referee: Jorge Figueroa

15 November 2015 13	Oviedo	2–0	Gimnàstic	Oviedo
11:00	Koné 22'; Susaeta 37'	Report	(yellow card) 31' Palanca; (yellow card) 64' Xavi Molina; (yellow card) 66' Manolo Martínez; (yellow card) 77' Álex López	Stadium: Carlos Tartiere; Attendance: 14,622; Referee: Rubén Ruipérez

22 November 2015 14	Gimnàstic	2–0	Llagostera	Tarragona
17:00	Rocha (yellow card) 15'; Bouzón 23'; Tito 49' (o.g.); Palanca (yellow card) 59'; Emaná (yellow card) 64'; Tejera (yellow card) 35'	Report	(yellow card) 19' (red card) 31' Escassi; (yellow card) 51' Querol; (yellow card) 64' Jorge García; (yellow card) 69' René; (yellow card) 78' Benja; (yellow card) 82' Fran Cruz	Stadium: Nou Estadi; Attendance: 10,162; Referee: Adrián Cordero

29 November 2015 15	Mirandés	0–1	Gimnàstic	Miranda de Ebro
17:00	Abdón Prats (yellow card) 80'	Report	(yellow card) 21' Tejera; (yellow card) 86' Xisco Campos; 90+3' (yellow card) 90+4' Naranjo	Stadium: Anduva; Attendance: 3,192; Referee: Saúl Ais

5 December 2015 16	Gimnàstic	2–2	Almería	Tarragona
19:00	Morcillo 2' (o.g.); Álex López 26'; Manolo Reina (yellow card) 56'; Tejera (yellow card) 69'; Bouzón (yellow card) 76'; Emaná (yellow card) 86'; Xisco Muñoz (yellow card) 90+3'		16' (yellow card) 41' Lolo Reyes; (yellow card) 25' Morcillo; (yellow card) 58' Montoro; (yellow card) 61' Iago Díaz; 87' (o.g.) Álex López	Stadium: Nou Estadi; Attendance: 5,897; Referee: Gorka Sagues

13 December 2015 17	Leganés	1–0	Gimnàstic	Leganés
17:00	Alexander 42'; Gabriel (yellow card) 74'; Serantes (yellow card) 89'	Report	(yellow card) 52' Pablo Marí; (yellow card) 73' Giner	Stadium: Butarque; Attendance: 4,157; Referee: Rubén Eiriz

19 December 2015 18	Gimnàstic	3–1	Zaragoza	Tarragona
19:00	Pablo Marí (yellow card) 26'; Jean Luc 39'; Manolo Reina (yellow card) 43'; Fali (yellow card) 47' (goal) 55'; Naranjo 87'		(yellow card) 8' (goal) 85' Isaac; (yellow card) 31' Ortuño; (yellow card) 51' Abraham	Stadium: Nou Estadi; Attendance: 8,103; Referee: Alberola Rojas

2 January 2016 19	Osasuna	1–1	Gimnàstic	Pamplona
18:00	David García (yellow card) 52'; Pablo Marí 62' (o.g.); Merino (yellow card) 71'	Report	(yellow card) 31' Bouzón; (yellow card) 41' Palanca; 54' (pen.) Marcos; (yellow card) 72' Naranjo; (yellow card) 77' Jean Luc	Stadium: El Sadar; Attendance: 15,166; Referee: Juan López Amaya

9 January 2016 20	Gimnàstic	1–2	Lugo	Tarragona
18:00	S. Emaná (yellow card) 40'; Naranjo 56'; Bouzón (yellow card) 74'		(yellow card) 45+1' (goal) 63' Jonathan Pereira; 62' Carlos Hernández; (yellow card) 87' José Juan	Stadium: Nou Estadi; Attendance: 5,679; Referee: Guillermo Cuadra Fernández

17 January 2016 21	Alavés	1–3	Gimnàstic	Vitoria
10:00	Barreiro 87'; Juli (yellow card) 90'; Manu García (yellow card) 90+1' (red card) 90+4'		(yellow card) 24' Pablo Marí; 38' (o.g.) Carpio; (yellow card) 52' Jean Luc; (yellow card) 69' Rocha; 81' A. Emaná; 90+3' S. Emaná	Stadium: Mendizorroza; Attendance: 10,162; Referee: Daniel Ocón Arráiz

24 January 2016 22	Albacete	1–1	Gimnàstic	Albacete
17:00	Jona 63' (pen.)		75' S. Emaná	Stadium: Carlos Belmonte; Attendance: 6,681; Referee: De la Fuente Ramos

31 January 2016 23	Gimnàstic	2–1	Tenerife	Tarragona
18:00	Muñiz (yellow card) 3'; Tejera (yellow card) 10'; Emaná (yellow card) 15' (goal) 37'; Naranjo 37'; Xavi Molina (yellow card) 87'		(red card) 35' Jorge; 48' Omar; (yellow card) 53' Jairo; (yellow card) 61' Lozano; (yellow card) 89' Alberto; 89' Carlos Ruiz	Stadium: Nou Estadi; Attendance: 10,162; Referee: Daniel Ocón Arráiz

7 February 2016 24	Girona	1–1	Gimnàstic	Girona
17:00	Lekić (yellow card) 17' (red card) 20'; Granell (yellow card) 31'; Lejeune (yellow card) 51'; Mata (yellow card) 63' (goal) 78' (pen.)	Report	29' Naranjo; (yellow card) 77' Bouzón; (yellow card) 83' Pablo Marí	Stadium: Montilivi; Attendance: 4,512; Referee: Jorge Figueroa

13 February 2016 25	Gimnàstic	1–0	Elche	Tarragona
18:00	Tejera (yellow card) 10'; Naranjo 11'; Mossa (yellow card) 89'	Report	(yellow card) 27' Mandi; (yellow card) 29' Fraile; (yellow card) 53' Pelayo; (yellow card) 80' Vergos	Stadium: Nou Estadi; Attendance: 4,247; Referee: Juan López Amaya

20 February 2016 26	Mallorca	2–2	Gimnàstic	Mallorca
18:00	Damià (yellow card) 60'; Lago Junior 64' (pen.) (yellow card) 65'; Brandon 84'	Report	(yellow card) 13' (goal) 21' Mossa; 38' Naranjo; (yellow card) 45+1' Tejera; (yellow card) 62' Bouzón; (yellow card) 63' Aníbal; (yellow card) 65' (red card) 81' Pablo Marí; (yellow card) 88' Madinda; (yellow card) 90+3' Reina	Stadium: Iberostar Stadium; Attendance: 7,485; Referee: Francisco Arias López

28 February 2016 27	Gimnàstic	1–1	Valladolid	Tarragona
17:00	Jean Luc (yellow card) 13'; Emaná 22' (yellow card) 28'; Xavi Molina (yellow card) 26'	Report	(yellow card) 19' Nikos; 25' (yellow card) 39' Rennella	Stadium: Nou Estadi; Attendance: 6,938; Referee: Daniel Ocón Arráiz

6 March 2016 28	Alcorcón	1–1	Gimnàstic	Alcorcón
18:00	Fausto (yellow card) 48'; Máyor (yellow card) 49'; Djené (yellow card) 65' (red card) 70'; Campaña 68'; Álvaro Rey (yellow card) 85'		(yellow card) 30' Bouzón; (yellow card) 82' Tejera; 82' Madinda; (yellow card) 90' Emaná	Stadium: Santo Domingo; Attendance: 2,496; Referee: Jorge Valdés Aller

13 March 2016 29	Gimnàstic	1–1	Ponferradina	Tarragona
18:00	Tejera (yellow card) 29'; Jean Luc (yellow card) 36'; Naranjo 48'; Xisco Campos (yellow card) 62'; Aburjania (yellow card) 62'; Emaná (yellow card) 90+2'		2' (o.g.) Xavi Molina; (yellow card) 4' Aguza; (yellow card) 53' Miquel; (yellow card) 58' Baró; (yellow card) 85' Caiado	Stadium: Nou Estadi; Attendance: 7,272; Referee: Trujillo Suárez

20 March 2016 30	Bilbao Athletic	0–4	Gimnàstic	Bilbao
17:00			25' Naranjo; (yellow card) 39' Muñiz; 56' Aburjania; 69' 79' Emaná	Stadium: San Mamés; Attendance: 4,861; Referee: Cordero Vega

26 March 2016 31	Gimnàstic	1–0	Numancia	Tarragona
18:00	Emaná 47'; Tejera (yellow card) 69'; Naranjo (yellow card) 81'		(yellow card) 44' (red card) 90+3' Pablo Valcarce	Stadium: Nou Estadi; Attendance: 6,893; Referee: Alberola Rojas

3 April 2016 32	Gimnàstic	4–4	Córdoba	Tarragona
12:00	Jean Luc (yellow card) 5'; Aníbal 18'; Aburjania (yellow card) 37'; Lobato 43'; Palanca 70'; Muñiz (yellow card) 75'; Emaná 87' (pen.)	Report	6' (pen.) Fidel; (yellow card) 8' Rodas; 41' 44' 80' Andone; (yellow card) 69' Caballero; (yellow card) 73' (red card) 85' Deivid	Stadium: Nou Estadi; Attendance: 7,910; Referee: Francisco Arias López

10 April 2016 33	Huesca	2–0	Gimnàstic	Huesca
17:00	Christian 11' (yellow card) 79'; Morillas (yellow card) 47'; González 62'	Report	(yellow card) 30' Naranjo; (yellow card) 52' Bouzón; (yellow card) 90+3' Madinda; (yellow card) 90+3' Muñiz	Stadium: El Toralín; Attendance: 3,254; Referee: Trujillo Suárez

17 April 2016 34	Gimnàstic	0–0	Oviedo	Tarragona
12:00	Aníbal (yellow card) 63'; Palanca (yellow card) 65'	Report	(yellow card) 44' (red card) 90+1' Verdés; (yellow card) 56' Valle; (yellow card) 70' Vila; (yellow card) 89' Miño	Stadium: Nou Estadi; Attendance: 7,772; Referee: Arcediano Monescillo

23 April 2016 35	Llagostera	1–1	Gimnàstic	Palamós
18:00	Escassi (yellow card) 11'; Oriol (yellow card) 60'; Natalio 63'; Ríos (yellow card) 67'	Report	(yellow card) 12' Mossa; (yellow card) 15' Suzuki; 51' (yellow card) 90+1' Naranjo	Stadium: Palamós Costa Brava; Attendance: 1,246; Referee: González Fuertes

1 May 2016 36	Gimnàstic	3–2	Mirandés	Tarragona
17:00	Aburjania 49'; Naranjo 68' 70'; Mossa (yellow card) 76'; Xisco Campos (yellow card) 81'	Report	24' Aridane; (yellow card) 27' (red card) 36' Oyarzun; 90+3' (pen.) (yellow card) 90+4' Salinas	Stadium: Nou Estadi; Attendance: 6,143; Referee: Ruipérez Marín

7 May 2016 37	Almería	1–2	Gimnàstic	Almería
18:00	Fran Vélez (yellow card) 41' (red card) 90'; Ximo Navarro 45+2' (yellow card) 73'; Adri Castellano (yellow card) 50'; Lolo Reyes (yellow card) 90+7'	Report	(yellow card) 24' Mossa; 36' Naranjo; (yellow card) 45+1' Valentín; (yellow card) 49' Aburjania; (yellow card) 59' Giner; 85' Xavi Molina	Stadium: Juegos Mediterráneos; Attendance: 7,538; Referee: David Pérez Pallas

15 May 2016 38	Gimnàstic	0–0	Leganés	Tarragona
12:00	Naranjo (yellow card) 26'; Tejera (yellow card) 80'	Report	(red card) 32' Insua; (yellow card) 46' Gabriel; (yellow card) 53' Guillermo; (yellow card) 62' Bustinza; (yellow card) 85' Sastre	Stadium: Nou Estadi; Attendance: 8,603; Referee: Figueroa Vázquez

22 May 2016 39	Zaragoza	0–1	Gimnàstic	Zaragoza
12:00	Ros (yellow card) 29'; Guitián (yellow card) 82'; Rico (yellow card) 86'; Lanzarote (yellow card) 90'	Report	(yellow card) 44' Suzuki; (yellow card) 58' Mossa; (yellow card) 62' Lobato; 83' (pen.) Naranjo; (yellow card) 89' Tejera; (yellow card) 90' Reina	Stadium: La Romareda; Attendance: 23,763; Referee: De la Fuente Ramos

25 May 2016 40	Gimnàstic	1–0	Osasuna	Tarragona
20:30	Naranjo (yellow card) 32' (goal) 82'; Reina (yellow card) 90+4'	Report	(yellow card) 19' Manolín; (yellow card) 70' David García; (yellow card) 74' Oier; (yellow card) 88' M. Flaño; (yellow card) 88' Maikel; (yellow card) 90+1' Merino	Stadium: Nou Estadi; Attendance: 14,571; Referee: Ocón Arráiz

29 May 2016 41	Lugo	0–3	Gimnàstic	Lugo
20:00	Pita (yellow card) 30'; Sergio Marcos (yellow card) 39'; Seoane (yellow card) 44'; Israel (yellow card) 90'	Report	17' Mossa; (yellow card) 35' Madinda; 38' Emaná; 90+2' Aníbal; (yellow card) 90+2' Xavi Molina	Stadium: Anxo Carro; Attendance: 2,570; Referee: José Luis Munuera Montero

4 June 2016 42	Gimnàstic	1–1	Alavés	Tarragona
20:30	Xavi Molina 65'; Valentín (yellow card) 85'; Manolo Martínez (yellow card) 90+4'	Report	(yellow card) 12' Llamas; (yellow card) 44' Bernardello; 90' Barreiro	Stadium: Nou Estadi; Attendance: 12,896; Referee: Eiriz Mata

=== Copa del Rey ===
9 September 2015 2	Gimnàstic	2–2 (a.e.t.) (5–4 p)	Girona	Tarragona
20:30	Palanca 43' 88'; Manolo Martínez (yellow card) 47'; Arel (yellow card) 57'; Mossa (yellow card) 115'	Report	67' Jairo; 90+1' (yellow card) 117' Marcelo; (yellow card) 90+2' Javi Álamo	Stadium: Nou Estadi; Referee: Ocon Arráiz
	Penalties
	Marcos (penalty scored); Emaná (penalty scored); Tejera (penalty scored); Rocha (penalty scored); Palanca (penalty scored)		(penalty scored) Jairo; (penalty scored) Álamo; (penalty missed) Marcelo; (penalty scored) Clerc; (penalty scored) Felipe Sanchón

14 October 2015 3	Almería	2–1	Gimnàstic	Almería
20:30	Soriano 13'; Lolo Reyes (yellow card) 44'; Quique 74'	Report	(yellow card) 46' Emaná; (yellow card) 59' Fali; 90' Álex López	Stadium: Juegos Mediterráneos; Referee: Valdés Aller

=== Play-offs ===
==== Semifinals ====
8 June 2016 1st leg	Osasuna	3–1	Gimnàstic	Osasuna
20:00	Merino 33' 41'; Kodro 58' (yellow card) 86'; Roberto Torres (yellow card) 70'	Report	68' Jean Luc; (yellow card) 68' Bouzón; (yellow card) 70' Madinda; (yellow card) 74' Mossa; (yellow card) 90+2' Valentín	Stadium: El Sadar; Attendance: 17,750; Referee: Trujillo Suárez

11 June 2016 2nd leg	Gimnàstic	2–3	Osasuna	Tarragona
19:00	Naranjo 7'; Molina (yellow card) 28'; Valentín (yellow card) 35'; Tejera (yellow card) 37'; Madinda (yellow card) 53'; Muñiz (yellow card) 76' (goal) 79'	Report	32' David García; (yellow card) 35' (goal) 74' Merino; (yellow card) 38' Tano; 54' (yellow card) 89' Javi Flaño; (yellow card) 58' Miguel Flaño; (yellow card) 66' Unai García	Stadium: Nou Estadi; Attendance: 12,906; Referee: Cordero Vega
