= Toni Muñoz =

Toni Muñoz may refer to:

- Toni Muñoz (footballer, born 1968), Spanish football left back
- Toni Muñoz (footballer, born 1982), Spanish football forward
