= José Naranjo (footballer, born 1994) =

Spanish footballer

Personal information
- Full name: José Manuel García Naranjo
- Date of birth: 28 July 1994 (age 32)
- Place of birth: Rociana del Condado, Spain
- Height: 1.86 m (6 ft 1 in)
- Position: Forward

Youth career
- Recreativo

Senior career*
Years	Team	Apps	(Gls)
2011–2014	Recreativo B	67	(26)
2013–2015	Recreativo	6	(0)
2014–2015	→ Villarreal B (loan)	25	(4)
2014	→ Villarreal (loan)	0	(0)
2015–2016	Gimnàstic	34	(15)
2016–2017	Celta	0	(0)
2017–2018	Genk	21	(7)
2017–2018	→ Leganés (loan)	16	(1)
2018–2021	Tenerife	46	(6)
2020–2021	→ AEK Larnaca (loan)	35	(7)
2021–2023	Ponferradina	69	(11)
2023–2024	Jagiellonia Białystok	29	(6)
2023–2024	Jagiellonia Białystok II	2	(0)
2024–2025	Ibiza	17	(2)
- * Club domestic league appearances and goals as of 17 January 2025

José Manuel García Naranjo (born 28 July 1994) is a Spanish professional footballer who plays as a forward.

== Career ==
Born in Rociana del Condado, Huelva, Andalusia, Naranjo graduated from local Recreativo, and spent his first year as a senior with the B-team in Tercera División. On 2 June 2013 he first appeared for the main squad, starting in a 0–0 away draw against Sporting de Gijón in the Segunda División.

In July 2014, Naranjo was loaned to Segunda División B's Villarreal B, in a season-long deal. He appeared in his first game with the first team on 4 December, starting in a 2–1 away win against Cádiz in the campaign's Copa del Rey.

In 2015 Naranjo signed a three-year deal with Gimnàstic, newly promoted to the second level. He scored his first professional goal on 29 November, netting the game's only in an away success against Mirandés.

Naranjo also scored seven goals in a period of three months (between January and March 2016), including match-winners against Tenerife and Elche. On 1 May, he scored a brace in a 3–2 home win against Mirandés.

In June 2016, Naranjo signed a five-year deal with La Liga club Celta Vigo, for a rumoured fee of €1 million. He only appeared in three matches for the club, including two in the UEFA Europa League, before departing.

In January 2017, Naranjo moved abroad for the first time in his career after agreeing to a contract with Belgian Pro League side Genk. On 1 September, he returned to Spain and its first division after agreeing to a one-year loan deal with Leganés.

On 27 July 2018, Naranjo signed a four-year deal with Tenerife in the second division. On 30 January 2020, he was loaned to Cypriot First Division side AEK Larnaca until the end of the season, with the deal being extended for a further year on 25 August.

Naranjo cut ties with Tenerife on 24 June 2021, and moved to fellow second division side Ponferradina on 12 July.

After appearing in 36 games and scoring three goals in the Segunda División in the 2022–23 season, he signed a two-year deal with Ekstraklasa side Jagiellonia Białystok on 28 June 2023. He recorded six league goals during Jagiellonia's title-winning campaign, before mutually agreeing to leave the club on 19 June 2024.

On 12 August 2024, Naranjo moved to Primera Federación club Ibiza. On 17 January 2025, he terminated his deal by mutual consent.

== Career statistics ==
As of match played on 22 December 2024

Appearances and goals by club, season and competition
Club	Season	League			National cup (Note: Includes Copa del Rey, Belgian Cup, Cypriot Cup, Polish Cup)		Other		Total	
Club	Season	Division	Apps	Goals	Apps	Goals	Apps	Goals	Apps	Goals
Recreativo	2012–13	Segunda División	2	0	0	0	—		2	0
Recreativo	2013–14	Segunda División	4	0	3	0	—		7	0
Recreativo	Total		6	0	3	0	0	0	9	0
Villarreal (loan)	2014–15	La Liga	0	0	2	0	—		2	0
Villarreal B (loan)	2014–15	Segunda División B	25	4	—		—		25	4
Gimnàstic	2015–16	Segunda División	34	15	2	0	2 (Note: Appearances in the 2016 Segunda División play-offs)	1	38	16
Celta Vigo	2016–17	La Liga	0	0	1	0	2 (Note: Appearances in the UEFA Europa League)	0	3	0
Genk	2016–17	Belgian First Division A	20	6	1	0	—		21	6
Genk	2017–18	Belgian First Division A	1	1	0	0	—		1	1
Genk	Total		21	7	1	0	0	0	22	7
Leganés (loan)	2017–18	La Liga	16	1	6	0	—		22	1
Tenerife	2018–19	Segunda División	36	6	1	0	—		37	6
Tenerife	2019–20	Segunda División	10	0	2	2	—		12	2
Tenerife	Total		46	6	3	2	0	0	49	8
AEK Larnaca (loan)	2019–20	Cypriot First Division	5	1	0	0	—		5	1
AEK Larnaca (loan)	2020–21	Cypriot First Division	30	6	2	3	—		32	9
AEK Larnaca (loan)	Total		35	7	2	3	0	0	37	10
Ponferradina	2021–22	Segunda División	34	8	2	0	—		36	8
Ponferradina	2022–23	Segunda División	35	3	1	1	—		36	4
Ponferradina	Total		69	11	3	1	0	0	72	12
Jagiellonia Białystok	2023–24	Ekstraklasa	29	6	4	2	—		33	8
Jagiellonia Białystok II	2023–24	III liga, group I	2	0	—		—		2	0
Ibiza	2024–25	Primera Federación	17	2	1	0	—		18	2
Career totals			300	59	28	8	4	1	332	68

== Honours ==
Jagiellonia Białystok

- Ekstraklasa: 2023–24
