= Huelva (disambiguation) =

Huelva may refer to:

- Huelva, a city in southern Spain
- Huelva (surname), list of people with the surname
- Province of Huelva, the province of Spain with Huelva as its capital
- Roman Catholic Diocese of Huelva, which has the same boundaries as the province
- Huelva (Spanish Congress Electoral District), which also coincides geographically with the province
- University of Huelva, in the city of Huelva
- Recreativo de Huelva, a professional football (soccer) team based in the city of Huelva
- Recreativo de Huelva B, the reserve team of Recreativo de Huelva
- Sporting de Huelva, a women's football club based in the city of Huelva
- CB Ciudad de Huelva, a former professional basketball team that was based in the city of Huelva
- Condado de Huelva, a Denominación de Origen (DO) for wines located in the south-east of the province of Huelva
- Huelva International Film Festival
