= Manolo Martínez =

Spanish footballer (born 1980)

Personal information
- Full name: Manuel Martínez Lara
- Date of birth: 15 June 1980 (age 46)
- Place of birth: Bigastro, Spain
- Height: 1.83 m (6 ft 0 in)
- Position: Defensive midfielder

Team information
- Current team: Gimnàstic (assistant)

Youth career
- Hércules

Senior career*
Years	Team	Apps	(Gls)
1998–2003	Hércules	118	(5)
2003–2007	Gimnàstic	77	(4)
2007–2010	Tenerife	111	(1)
2010–2013	Recreativo	89	(1)
2013–2014	Levadiakos	13	(0)
2014–2017	Gimnàstic	36	(0)
Total		444	(11)

Managerial career
- 2023–: Gimnàstic (assistant)
- * Club domestic league appearances and goals

Manuel 'Manolo' Martínez Lara (born 15 June 1980) is a Spanish football coach and former player who played mainly as a defensive midfielder but also as a central defender. He is the current assistant manager of Gimnàstic de Tarragona.

He appeared in 228 Segunda División matches over ten seasons, scoring a combined five goals for Hércules, Gimnàstic (two stints), Tenerife and Recreativo. He also competed professionally in Greece.

== Club career ==
Born in Bigastro, Alicante, Valencian Community, Martínez started his professional career with local Hércules CF, as a central defender. After years spent almost exclusively in Segunda División B he had a brief spell in La Liga, playing three games for Gimnàstic de Tarragona and being released in the 2007 winter transfer window; his debut in the latter competition consisted of 55 minutes of a 1–2 home loss against RC Celta de Vigo, on 10 September 2006.

Martínez then moved to CD Tenerife, where he reconverted into a defensive midfielder, greatly helping the club return to the top division in 2009 after a seven-year hiatus. In the subsequent season he played more often than not in his secondary position – stopper – and his performances were overall poorer, with the Canary Islands team being immediately relegated although it would only be certified in the last round against Valencia CF (0–1 away defeat).

In July 2010, aged 30, Martínez did not renew his Tenerife contract and agreed a two-year deal with another club in Segunda División, Recreativo de Huelva. On 10 July 2013 he moved abroad, joining Super League Greece side Levadiakos FC.

In February 2014, Martínez suffered a knee injury which sidelined him for the remainder of the campaign. He returned to action in July, and subsequently signed a one-year contract with Gimnàstic; during his second spell at the Nou Estadi de Tarragona he was severely hindered by physical problems, and on 3 July 2017 he announced his retirement at the age of 37.
