= Huelva (surname) =

Huelva is a surname of Spanish origin. Notable people with the surname are as follows:

- Amaro Huelva (born 1973), Spanish politician
- Elena Huelva (2002–2023), Spanish influencer and writer
