= Pablo Marí =

Spanish footballer (born 1993)

Personal information
- Full name: Pablo Marí Villar
- Date of birth: 31 August 1993 (age 33)
- Place of birth: Almussafes, Spain
- Height: 1.93 m (6 ft 4 in)
- Position: Centre-back

Youth career
- Mallorca

Senior career*
Years	Team	Apps	(Gls)
2010–2013	Mallorca B	69	(3)
2011–2012	Mallorca	2	(0)
2013–2016	Gimnàstic	83	(6)
2016–2019	Manchester City	0	(0)
2016–2017	→ Girona (loan)	8	(0)
2017–2018	→ NAC Breda (loan)	31	(3)
2018–2019	→ Deportivo La Coruña (loan)	37	(2)
2019–2020	Flamengo	22	(2)
2020	→ Arsenal (loan)	2	(0)
2020–2023	Arsenal	12	(0)
2022	→ Udinese (loan)	15	(2)
2022–2023	→ Monza (loan)	30	(1)
2023–2025	Monza	53	(0)
2025–2026	Fiorentina	24	(0)
2026	Al Hilal	5	(0)
- * Club domestic league appearances and goals as of 29 January 2026

Pablo Marí Villar (born 31 August 1993) is a Spanish professional footballer who plays as a centre-back.

Marí graduated from Mallorca's youth academy and played for various clubs throughout his career, in Spain, the Netherlands, Brazil, England and Italy. He won the Copa Libertadores and Série A in 2019 with Flamengo, and was included in the Série A Team of the Year that year.

== Career ==
=== Mallorca ===
Born in Almussafes, Valencian Community, Marí was a product of RCD Mallorca's youth system. He made his debut as a senior with the reserves at the age of just 17, going on to spend several seasons in the third division.

Marí made his first appearance with the first team on 7 December 2011, playing 30 minutes in a 2–2 draw against Granada CF after coming off the bench for fellow youth graduate Pedro Bigas. On 5 May 2012 he played his second La Liga game, again acting as a substitute in a 1–0 home win over Levante UD.

Marí continued to be almost exclusively associated with the B-side until the end of his spell in the Balearic Islands.

=== Gimnàstic ===
On 2 September 2013, Marí signed a contract with Gimnàstic de Tarragona also in the third level. He made his debut for the Catalans on 12 October, starting and conceding a penalty in a 2–2 draw at CD Olímpic de Xàtiva.

Marí scored his first goal for Nàstic on 1 December 2013, the winner in a 2–1 home victory against Levante UD B. On 25 June 2015, after achieving promotion to Segunda División, he signed a new three-year deal with the club.

Marí scored his first professional goal on 30 August 2015, netting his team's first in a 2–1 away defeat of CD Tenerife.

=== Manchester City ===
On 15 August 2016, Marí was transferred to Premier League side Manchester City. A day later, he was loaned to Girona FC in a season-long deal.

In the following two campaigns, still owned by City, Marí played with NAC Breda (Dutch Eredivisie, where he was team captain) and Deportivo de La Coruña (Spanish second tier).

=== Flamengo ===
On 11 July 2019, Marí signed with Flamengo on a contract through 2022, for an approximate fee of €1.3 million (or R$5.5 million). He became the third Spanish player for the Brazilian club, after goalkeeper Talladas in the late 1930s and forward José Ufarte in the 1960s. He made his debut as a starter on 28 July in a Série A match against Botafogo de Futebol e Regatas at the Maracanã Stadium, a 3–2 win; he quickly established himself in the first team, with manager Jorge Jesus pairing him with Rodrigo Caio.

Marí scored his first goal for the Mengão on 25 August 2019 with a volley inside the box in a 3–0 away victory over Ceará Sporting Club. His second in the league came on 7 September, this time with a header against Avaí FC in a 3–0 win at Estádio Nacional Mané Garrincha. In November, he became the first Spaniard to win the Copa Libertadores, the major South American club competition. Marí made headlines for wearing the number 24 in the Copa Libertadores, as the number is subject to a homophobic taboo in Brazil.

=== Arsenal ===
On 29 January 2020, Marí joined English Premier League club Arsenal on loan until the end of the season, with an option for Arsenal to make the deal permanent in the summer. Arsenal's technical director Edu said: "Pablo is an experienced player who will provide us with additional defensive quality. We have been monitoring Pablo’s career for a while and we are very pleased to have reached agreement with Flamengo for him to join us initially until the end of our season." Marí made two appearances for Arsenal, a 2–0 FA Cup win at Portsmouth and a 1–0 Premier League win at home to West Ham, before the season was suspended due to COVID-19 pandemic.

On 17 June 2020, Marí was injured playing in a 3–0 defeat at Manchester City, in the first game of the league restart. Arsenal confirmed post-match he would miss the remainder of the season with a "significant" ankle injury. Despite this injury, Arsenal announced on 24 June that Marí would join the club permanently for an undisclosed fee on 1 July, upon the opening of the summer transfer window.

On 3 December 2020, Marí scored his first goal for Arsenal in a 4–1 home win over Rapid Wien in the UEFA Europa League. Mari only made 28 appearances for the club.

Mari appeared in the Amazon Original sports docuseries All or Nothing: Arsenal, which documented the club activities during the 2021–22 season.

==== Loans to Udinese and Monza ====
On 20 January 2022, Marí joined Serie A club Udinese on loan until the end of the 2021–22 season.

On 11 August, he was loaned to newly promoted Serie A side Monza. Marì made his debut for Monza on 14 August, as a starter in a 2–1 Serie A defeat to Torino.

=== Monza ===
On 4 May 2023, Monza signed Marí on a permanent deal after they activated his release clause after they secured safety following their 1–1 draw at home to Roma.

=== Fiorentina ===
On 28 January 2025, Marí signed for fellow Italian club Fiorentina on a permanent deal. His arrival meant that he reunited with his former manager at Monza Raffaele Palladino.

=== Al Hilal ===
On 10 January 2026, Marí joined Al Hilal in Saudi Arabia, on a six-months contract with an option to extend.

== Personal life ==
Marí and his wife Veronica Chacon have a son, Pablo Jr. (b. 2018).

=== Stabbing ===
On 27 October 2022, Marí was stabbed and injured at a Carrefour supermarket in Assago, Metropolitan City of Milan. He was taken to hospital conscious and not in a serious condition. Monza's CEO Adriano Galliani stated: "His life is not in danger, he should recover quickly". A man was killed during the attack and four others were injured. The perpetrator was a man with mental health problems.

== Career statistics ==
As of match played 13 April 2026

Appearances and goals by club, season and competition
Club	Season	League			National cup (Note: Includes Copa del Rey, KNVB Cup, Copa do Brasil, Coppa Italia)		League cup (Note: Includes EFL Cup)		Continental		Other		Total	
Club	Season	Division	Apps	Goals	Apps	Goals	Apps	Goals	Apps	Goals	Apps	Goals	Apps	Goals
Mallorca B	2010–11	Segunda División B	19	1	—		—		—		—		19	1
Mallorca B	2011–12	Segunda División B	22	1	—		—		—		—		22	1
Mallorca B	2012–13	Segunda División B	28	1	—		—		—		—		28	1
Mallorca B	Total		69	3	0	0	0	0	0	0	0	0	69	3
Mallorca	2011–12	La Liga	2	0	0	0	—		—		—		2	0
Mallorca	2012–13	La Liga	0	0	0	0	—		—		—		0	0
Mallorca	Total		2	0	0	0	0	0	0	0	0	0	2	0
Gimnàstic	2013–14	Segunda División B	23	2	3	0	—		—		6 (Note: Appearances in Segunda División B play-offs)	0	32	2
Gimnàstic	2014–15	Segunda División B	35	3	2	0	—		—		2	0	39	3
Gimnàstic	2015–16	Segunda División	25	1	0	0	—		—		—		25	1
Gimnàstic	Total		83	6	5	0	0	0	0	0	8	0	96	6
Manchester City	2016–17	Premier League	—		—		—		—		—		0	0
Manchester City	2017–18	Premier League	—		—		—		—		—		0	0
Manchester City	2018–19	Premier League	—		—		—		—		—		0	0
Manchester City	Total		0	0	0	0	0	0	0	0	0	0	0	0
Girona (loan)	2016–17	Segunda División	8	0	1	0	—		—		—		9	0
NAC Breda (loan)	2017–18	Eredivisie	31	3	1	0	—		—		—		32	3
Deportivo La Coruña (loan)	2018–19	Segunda División	37	2	0	0	—		—		1 (Note: Appearance in La Liga play-offs)	0	38	2
Flamengo	2019	Série A	22	2	0	0	—		6 (Note: Appearances in Copa Libertadores)	1	2 (Note: Appearances in FIFA Club World Cup)	0	30	3
Arsenal (loan)	2019–20	Premier League	2	0	1	0	0	0	—		—		3	0
Arsenal	2020–21	Premier League	10	0	1	0	0	0	5 (Note: Appearances in UEFA Europa League)	1	—		16	1
Arsenal	2021–22	Premier League	2	0	0	0	1	0	—		—		3	0
Arsenal	Arsenal total		14	0	2	0	1	0	5	1	0	0	22	1
Udinese (loan)	2021–22	Serie A	15	2	0	0	—		—		—		15	2
Monza (loan)	2022–23	Serie A	30	1	1	0	—		—		—		31	1
Monza	2023–24	Serie A	34	0	1	0	—		—		—		35	0
Monza	2024–25	Serie A	19	0	2	0	—		—		—		21	0
Monza	Monza total		83	1	4	0	0	0	0	0	0	0	87	1
Fiorentina	2024–25	Serie A	13	0	—		—		0	0	—		13	0
Fiorentina	2025–26	Serie A	11	0	—		—		5 (Note: Appearances in UEFA Conference League)	0	—		16	0
Fiorentina	Total		24	0	0	0	—		5	0	—		29	0
Al Hilal	2025–26	Saudi Pro League	5	0	0	0	—		3 (Note: Appearances in AFC Champions League Elite)	0	—		8	0
Career total			393	19	13	0	1	0	19	2	11	0	436	21

== Honours ==
Flamengo

- Campeonato Brasileiro Série A: 2019
- Copa Libertadores: 2019

Arsenal

- FA Cup: 2019–20

Individual

- Copa Libertadores Team of the Tournament: 2019
- Campeonato Brasileiro Série A Team of the Year: 2019
