= Xisco Muñoz =

Spanish footballer and manager (born 1980)

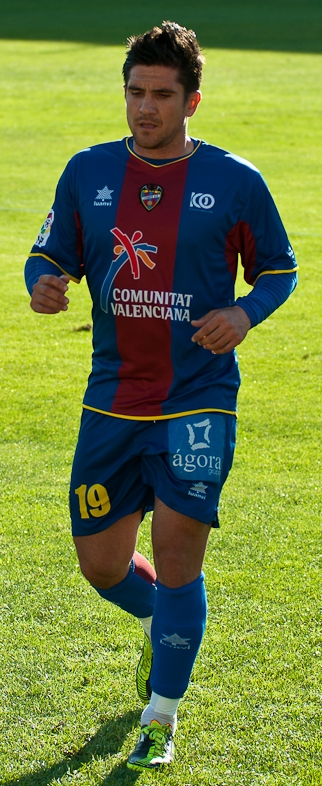
- Xisco with Levante in 2011

Personal information
- Full name: Francisco Javier Muñoz Llompart
- Date of birth: 5 September 1980 (age 46)
- Place of birth: Manacor, Spain
- Height: 1.75 m (5 ft 9 in)
- Position: Winger

Team information
- Current team: Johor Darul Ta'zim (head coach)

Youth career
- Mallorca
- Valencia

Senior career*
| Years | Team | Apps | (Gls) |
| 1998 | Mallorca B | 10 | (0) |
| 1999–2003 | Valencia B | 39 | (15) |
| 2000–2001 | → Recreativo (loan) | 39 | (10) |
| 2001–2002 | → Tenerife (loan) | 28 | (1) |
| 2002–2003 | → Recreativo (loan) | 23 | (6) |
| 2003–2005 | Valencia | 44 | (4) |
| 2005–2009 | Betis | 73 | (8) |
| 2009–2011 | Levante | 54 | (9) |
| 2011–2014 | Dinamo Tbilisi | 98 | (62) |
| 2014–2016 | Gimnàstic | 25 | (2) |
| Total | | 433 | (117) |

International career
| 1998 | Spain U17 | 3 | (1) |
| 1998–1999 | Spain U18 | 6 | (2) |
| 2000–2001 | Spain U21 | 8 | (2) |

Managerial career
- 2017: Pobla Mafumet (interim)
- 2020: Dinamo Tbilisi
- 2020–2021: Watford
- 2021–2022: Huesca
- 2022–2023: Anorthosis
- 2023: Sheffield Wednesday
- 2023–2024: DAC Dunajská Streda
- 2025–: Johor Darul Ta'zim
- * Club domestic league appearances and goals

Francisco Javier Muñoz Llompart (born 5 September 1980), known as Xisco, is a Spanish football manager and former player who played mainly as a left winger. He is currently head coach of Malaysia Super League club Johor Darul Ta'zim.

He played 194 matches and scored 20 goals over nine seasons in La Liga, spending four years at Betis, also representing Valencia, Tenerife, Recreativo and Levante and winning the 2004 UEFA Cup with Valencia. Starting in 2011, he played four seasons in Georgia with Dinamo Tbilisi.

In 2019, Xisco rejoined Dinamo Tbilisi as part of the technical team, and in 2020 became their head coach. In December 2020, he was appointed at Watford, achieving promotion to the Premier League in his first season but being sacked in October 2021 despite the club sitting 15th. That same month, he became manager of Huesca, before being replaced in June 2022. He signed for Anorthosis in October that year, but left three months later. In July 2023, he joined Sheffield Wednesday as head coach before being dismissed in October after failing to win any matches in charge.

== Playing career ==
=== Valencia ===
Xisco was born in Manacor, Balearic Islands. He began in the youth ranks of local Mallorca, making ten senior appearances for the B team in the Segunda División B in 1998. After two years with Valencia's equivalent, he moved on loan to Recreativo de Huelva of Segunda División, scoring ten goals in his first season. He then joined Tenerife for 2001–02, before returning (always on loan) to his previous club for the 2002–03 campaign, still in La Liga.

Xisco returned to Valencia in summer 2003 for two additional seasons, making 22 appearances as the Che conquered the 2004 league title; he scored once as a substitute on 2 November 2003 to conclude a 5–0 away win against Mallorca. He added eight matches in their victorious run in the UEFA Cup also in that year, but remained on the bench in the final against Marseille.

=== Betis ===
Xisco signed with Real Betis in 2005 on a six-year deal, often delivering in various attacking positions and displaying all-around teamwork. He netted three times in 2006–07, including a couple of late goals against Racing de Santander and Gimnàstic de Tarragona as the Andalusians only avoided top-flight relegation in the last matchday.

In a rocky 2008–09 season, which ended in relegation, Xisco only featured in nine games, scoring once. Dark spots included being replaced after having himself been used as a substitute in a 2–1 home defeat to Málaga, on 11 January 2009.

=== Levante and later career ===
In the dying minutes of the August 2009 transfer window, Xisco rescinded his Betis contract and joined Levante also in the second division, for two seasons. In his first, he played the most he had in years, also scoring eight goals as the Valencian Community side returned to the top flight after a two-year absence.

Xisco contributed 26 matches – 18 starts – in 2010–11, as Levante finally managed to stay afloat. On 22 January 2011, he scored his only goal of the campaign in a 4–1 away loss against Sevilla, and was released in May.

Already aged 30, Xisco moved abroad for the first time, signing with Dinamo Tbilisi in Georgia and sharing teams with several compatriots. In 2012–13, he won the Erovnuli Liga and also scored a career-best 22 goals, best in the competition. The player and the team retained their titles a year later, and his goal concluded the 3–0 win at Sioni Bolnisi that confirmed it.

On 14 December 2014, Xisco returned to his homeland after agreeing to an 18-month deal with third-tier Gimnàstic. On 18 June 2016, he announced his retirement and became Vicente Moreno's assistant. In September of the following year, he stood in as manager of farm team Pobla de Mafumet in the Tercera División, after the promotion of Rodri to the Nàstic job.

== Coaching career ==
=== Dinamo Tbilisi ===
Xisco returned to Dinamo Tbilisi in January 2019, as part of Zaur Svanadze's staff. He left at the end of the year, after the team had claimed the national championship following a three-year absence.

In August 2020, Xisco again returned to Dinamo, now as head coach of the club. With several compatriots on the pitch and the bench, they won the league in December.

=== Watford ===
Xisco was appointed as manager of Watford on 21 December 2020, after the dismissal of Vladimir Ivić. His debut in the EFL Championship was five days later, a 1–0 home victory over leaders Norwich City.

After a run of five straight wins, Xisco was awarded the Championship Manager of the Month award for March 2021. On 24 April, his team achieved promotion to the Premier League with two games remaining, after a 1–0 win against Millwall at Vicarage Road.

Xisco was sacked on 3 October 2021, with the side being 15th after seven matches; it was the 13th change in the club's hotseat since the arrival of owner Gino Pozzo in 2012. In an official statement, Watford wrote that the coach had been presiding over a "negative trend at a time when team cohesion should be visibly improving".

=== Huesca ===
On 26 October 2021, Xisco signed as coach of Huesca. Having finished in 13th in his only season with nine wins out of 30, he was replaced in June by José Ángel Ziganda.

=== Anorthosis ===
On 4 October 2022, Xisco was appointed manager of Cypriot First Division club Anorthosis until the end of the season. Three months later, after a series of five winless games, he was replaced by Vesko Mihajlović.

=== Sheffield Wednesday ===
On 4 July 2023, Xisco joined Sheffield Wednesday as head coach; he brought in his brother Miguel as assistant, Roberto Cuesta as first-team coach and Antonello Brambilla as goalkeeper coach, all of whom he had worked with at Watford. His first competitive game in charge was at home to newly relegated Southampton, a 2–1 defeat, and culminated in a 1–0 away loss to West Bromwich Albion on 3 October. He had led the Owls to their worst ever start to a season, with just two points from the first ten matches. A day later, he was dismissed.

=== DAC Dunajská Streda ===
On 19 November 2023, Xisco signed as manager of DAC Dunajská Streda until the end of the campaign, with the option of another year. He was relieved of his duties on 27 November 2024.

=== Johor Darul Ta'zim ===
Xisco became coach of Johor Darul Ta'zim on 6 June 2025. During his first season in charge, he led the team to a fourth consecutive domestic treble, winning the Malaysia Super League, Malaysia FA Cup and Malaysia Cup. Additionally, he guided them to the quarter-finals of the AFC Champions League Elite, where they lost 2–1 to defending champions Al-Ahli.

== Personal life ==
Xisco is the older brother of another footballer, Toni Muñoz. He appeared once for Mallorca's first team, but spent the vast majority of his career in the lower leagues of his country.

== Career statistics ==
Appearances and goals by club, season and competition
| Club | Season | League | | | Cup | | Other | | Total | |
| Club | Season | Division | Apps | Goals | Apps | Goals | Apps | Goals | Apps | Goals |
|---|---|---|---|---|---|---|---|---|---|---|
| Recreativo (loan) | 2000–01 | Segunda División | 39 | 10 | 1 | 0 | — | | 40 | 10 |
| Tenerife (loan) | 2001–02 | La Liga | 28 | 1 | 1 | 0 | — | | 29 | 1 |
| Recreativo (loan) | 2002–03 | La Liga | 23 | 6 | 9 | 1 | — | | 32 | 7 |
| Valencia | 2003–04 | La Liga | 22 | 1 | 3 | 2 | 8 (Note: Appearances in UEFA Cup) | 0 | 33 | 3 |
| Valencia | 2004–05 | La Liga | 22 | 3 | 2 (Note: Appearances in Supercopa de España) | 0 | 10 (Note: Appearances in UEFA Europa League and UEFA Champions League) | 0 | 34 | 3 |
| Valencia | Total | | 44 | 4 | 5 | 2 | 18 | 0 | 67 | 6 |
| Betis | 2005–06 | La Liga | 25 | 1 | 3 | 0 | 8 | 0 | 36 | 3 |
| Betis | 2006–07 | La Liga | 17 | 3 | 5 | 0 | — | | 22 | 3 |
| Betis | 2007–08 | La Liga | 22 | 3 | 3 | 1 | — | | 25 | 4 |
| Betis | 2008–09 | La Liga | 9 | 1 | 4 | 0 | — | | 13 | 1 |
| Betis | 2009–10 | Segunda División | 0 | 0 | 0 | 0 | — | | 0 | 0 |
| Betis | Total | | 73 | 8 | 15 | 1 | 8 | 0 | 96 | 9 |
| Levante | 2009–10 | Segunda División | 28 | 8 | 0 | 0 | — | | 28 | 8 |
| Levante | 2010–11 | La Liga | 26 | 1 | 3 | 1 | — | | 29 | 2 |
| Levante | Total | | 57 | 9 | 4 | 1 | — | | 61 | 10 |
| Dinamo Tbilisi | 2011–12 | Erovnuli Liga | 30 | 15 | 2 | 0 | 5 (Note: Appearances in UEFA Europa League) | 3 | 37 | 18 |
| Dinamo Tbilisi | 2012–13 | Erovnuli Liga | 28 | 24 | 8 | 5 | — | | 36 | 29 |
| Dinamo Tbilisi | 2013–14 | Erovnuli Liga | 28 | 19 | 7 (Note: Appearances in Georgian Super Cup) | 5 | 5 | 2 | 40 | 26 |
| Dinamo Tbilisi | 2014–15 | Erovnuli Liga | 12 | 4 | 2 | 1 | 2 (Note: Appearances in UEFA Champions League) | 0 | 16 | 5 |
| Dinamo Tbilisi | Total | | 98 | 62 | 19 | 12 | 12 | 5 | 129 | 79 |
| Gimnàstic | 2014–15 | Segunda División B | 13 | 1 | 0 | 0 | — | | 13 | 1 |
| Gimnàstic | 2015–16 | Segunda División | 12 | 1 | 1 | 0 | — | | 13 | 1 |
| Gimnàstic | Total | | 25 | 1 | 1 | 0 | 0 | 0 | 26 | 1 |
| Career total | | | 364 | 96 | 46 | 16 | 38 | 5 | 448 | 117 |

== Managerial statistics ==
As of match played 19 November 2026

Managerial record by team and tenure
| Team | Nat. | From | To | Record | | | | | | | | Ref. |
| Team | Nat. | From | To | G | W | D | L | GF | GA | GD | Win % | Ref. |
|---|---|---|---|---|---|---|---|---|---|---|---|---|
| Dinamo Tbilisi | (Georgia (country)) | 24 August 2020 | 20 December 2020 | 11 | 8 | 0 | 3 | 19 | 12 | +7 | 72.73 | |
| Watford | (England) | 20 December 2020 | 3 October 2021 | 36 | 21 | 4 | 11 | 49 | 29 | +20 | 58.33 | |
| Huesca | (Spain) | 26 October 2021 | 13 June 2022 | 32 | 10 | 12 | 10 | 36 | 32 | +4 | 31.25 | |
| Anorthosis | (Cyprus) | 4 October 2022 | 5 January 2023 | 13 | 4 | 2 | 7 | 12 | 15 | −3 | 30.77 | |
| Sheffield Wednesday | (England) | 4 July 2023 | 4 October 2023 | 12 | 0 | 4 | 8 | 7 | 20 | −13 | 0.00 | |
| DAC Dunajská Streda | (Slovakia) | 19 November 2023 | 27 November 2024 | 40 | 18 | 11 | 11 | 61 | 39 | +22 | 45.00 | |
| Johor Darul Ta'zim | (Malaysia) | 6 June 2025 | Present | 74 | 61 | 6 | 7 | 274 | 46 | +228 | 82.43 | |
| Career Total | | | | 218 | 122 | 39 | 57 | 458 | 193 | +265 | 55.96 | |

== Honours ==
=== Player ===
Valencia

- La Liga: 2003–04
- UEFA Cup: 2003–04
- UEFA Super Cup: 2004

Dinamo Tbilisi

- Erovnuli Liga: 2012–13, 2013–14
- Georgian Cup: 2012–13, 2013–14
- Georgian Super Cup: 2014

Individual

- Erovnuli Liga top scorer: 2012–13, 2013–14
- Erovnuli Liga Player of the Year: 2013–14

=== Manager ===
Dinamo Tbilisi

- Erovnuli Liga: 2020

Watford

- EFL Championship runner-up: 2020–21

Johor Darul Ta'zim

- Malaysia Super League: 2025–26
- Malaysia FA Cup: 2025–26
- Malaysia Cup: 2026
- Piala Sumbangsih: 2025

Individual

- EFL Championship Manager of the Month: March 2021
