= Amaro Huelva =

Spanish politician

Amaro Huelva Betanzos
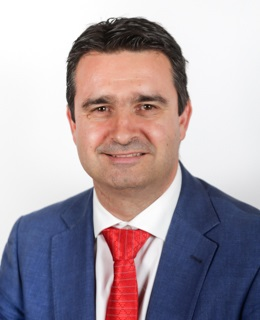

Senator of the Cortes Generales for Huelva
- Incumbent
- Assumed office 13 January 2016

Mayor of Rociana del Condado
- In office 1998–2003

Personal details
- Born: 18 July 1973 (age 52) Rociana del Condado, Spain
- Citizenship: Spain

Amaro Huelva Betanzos (born 18 July 1973) is a Spanish politician and senator. He is currently the spokesperson of the Spanish Senate committee on Agriculture, Fisheries and Food Commission. Huelva was elected Senator of the Cortes Generales on 13 January 2016.

Huelva began his political career in 1995, where he worked for the Spanish Socialist Workers' Party as the general secretary of the party. In 1998, Amaro was elected Mayor of Rociana del Condado and held the position till 2003 before being elected councilor in Rociana town hall. During the 2015 general elections, he ran for the senate and was elected to represent Rociana del Condado. He has been a member of the Senate of Spain in the 11th, 12th, 13th, 14th and 15th legislature of Spain respectively. He currently sits on the Senate House committees on Culture and Sports Commission, Mixed Commission for Relations with the Court of Accounts and Ibero-American Affairs Commission.
