= Cristian Lobato =

Spanish footballer

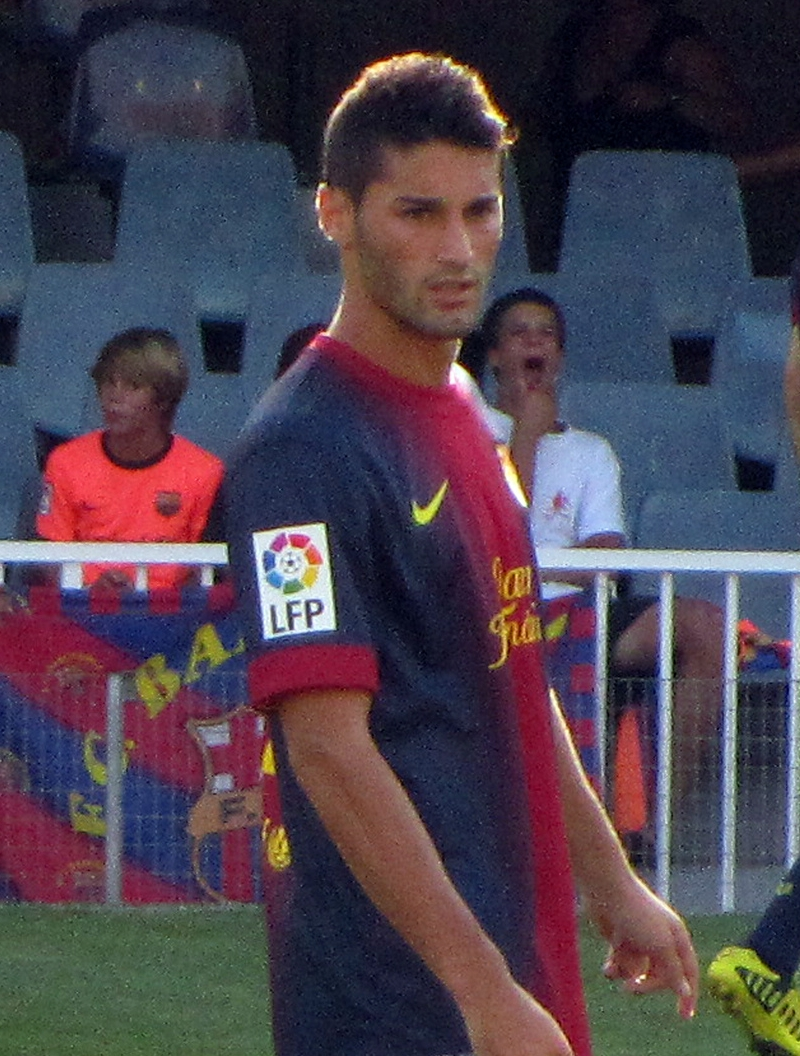
- Lobato with Barcelona B in 2012

Personal information
- Full name: Cristian Lobato Villegas
- Date of birth: 7 March 1989 (age 37)
- Place of birth: Esparreguera, Spain
- Height: 1.74 m (5 ft 9 in)
- Position: Winger

Team information
- Current team: Martorell

Youth career
- 1995–1999: Barcelona
- 1999–2008: Hospitalet

Senior career*
Years	Team	Apps	(Gls)
2008–2011	Hospitalet	84	(4)
2011–2013	Barcelona B	57	(8)
2014	Osasuna	12	(0)
2015	Asteras Tripolis	3	(0)
2015–2017	Gimnàstic	45	(2)
2017–2018	Sporting Kansas City	18	(3)
2018	→ Swope Park Rangers (loan)	2	(0)
2019–2021	Cornellà	30	(2)
2021–2024	Hospitalet	79	(5)
2024–2026	Igualada	55	(4)
2026–	Martorell		
- * Club domestic league appearances and goals as of 00:31, 17 August 2026 (UTC)

Cristian Lobato Villegas (born 7 March 1989) is a Spanish footballer who plays as a left winger for Martorell.

== Club career ==
=== Barcelona ===
Born in Esparreguera, Barcelona, Catalonia, Lobato started playing football in FC Barcelona's La Masia, but he was released still in his early teens, joining neighbours CE L'Hospitalet. He made his senior debut during the 2007–08 season in the Segunda División B, appearing in two games and suffering relegation.

In the 2009–10 campaign, Lobato was a very important first-team unit as Hospitalet returned to the third division. He then proceeded to play 33 league matches as the team retained their league status, already reconverted from left winger to left-back.

In late June 2011, Lobato returned to his first club Barcelona, signing a two-year contract and being assigned to the reserves. Shortly after, he was called by main squad manager Pep Guardiola to the preseason, taking the field on 23 July against HNK Hajduk Split.

Lobato made his official debut for Barça B on 27 August 2011, playing 52 minutes in a 2–0 Segunda División home loss to Villarreal CF B. On 30 May 2013, his contract expired and he was told that he would be released.

=== Later career ===
Lobato signed a five-year deal with Real Zaragoza in late January 2013, and underwent medical examinations in August after becoming a free agent. However, he failed to pass his medical, and the contract was declared void in September.

On 7 January 2014, having spent the first part of the campaign nursing a knee injury, Lobato joined La Liga strugglers CA Osasuna for six months. He made his debut in the Spanish top flight on 3 February, coming on as a late substitute in the 3–1 defeat at Villarreal CF.

After seven months without a club, Lobato signed a short-term deal with Super League Greece side Asteras Tripolis F.C. on 12 February 2015. On 26 November, he agreed to a one-year contract with Gimnàstic de Tarragona after training with the team for nearly two months.

On 29 June 2017, Lobato joined Sporting Kansas City of the Major League Soccer until the end of the 2018 season. He returned to both his country and the third tier in February 2019, agreeing to a contract at UE Cornellà.

Lobato competed in the Catalan lower and amateur leagues until his retirement, with Hospitalet and CF Igualada.

== Career statistics ==
As of match played 25 October 2020

Appearances and goals by club, season and competition
Club	Season	League			National Cup		Other		Total	
Club	Season	Division	Apps	Goals	Apps	Goals	Apps	Goals	Apps	Goals
Hospitalet	2007–08	Segunda División B	2	1	0	0	—		2	1
Hospitalet	2008–09	Tercera División	13	0	—		—		13	0
Hospitalet	2009–10	Tercera División	36	2	—		—		36	2
Hospitalet	2010–11	Segunda División B	33	1	2	0	—		35	1
Hospitalet	Total		84	4	2	0	0	0	86	4
Barcelona B	2011–12	Segunda División	31	1	—		—		31	1
Barcelona B	2012–13	Segunda División	26	7	—		—		26	7
Barcelona B	Total		57	8	—		—		57	8
Osasuna	2013–14	La Liga	12	0	0	0	—		12	0
Asteras Tripolis	2014–15	Super League Greece	3	0	—		—		3	0
Gimnàstic	2015–16	Segunda División	18	1	0	0	2 (Note: Appearances in La Liga play-offs)	0	20	1
Gimnàstic	2016–17	Segunda División	27	1	2	0	—		29	1
Gimnàstic	Total		45	2	2	0	2	0	49	2
Sporting Kansas City	2017	Major League Soccer	11	1	0	0	—		11	1
Sporting Kansas City	2018	Major League Soccer	7	2	1	0	—		8	2
Sporting Kansas City	Total		18	3	1	0	0	0	19	3
Swope Park Rangers (loan)	2018	USL Championship	2	0	0	0	—		2	0
Cornellà	2018–19	Segunda División B	8	0	0	0	1 (Note: Appearance in Segunda División B play-offs)	0	9	0
Cornellà	2019–20	Segunda División B	21	2	0	0	—		21	2
Cornellà	2020–21	Segunda División B	1	0	0	0	—		1	0
Cornellà	Total		30	2	0	0	1	0	31	2
Career total			251	19	5	0	3	0	259	19
