= Odón Betanzos Palacios =

Spanish poet and novelist

- Born: September 16, 1925; Rociana del Condado, Andalusia, Spain
- Died: September 24, 2007 (aged 82); New York City, U.S.
- Occupations: Poet, writer, professor
- Spouse: Amalia Migues

Odón Betanzos Palacios (September 16, 1925 – September 24, 2007) was a Spanish poet, novelist, literary critic and professor, based in New York from 1956 until his death in 2007. Odón Betanzos was also a tenured member of the Academia Norteamericana de la Lengua Española, of which was a Director and Corresponding Member of the Royal Spanish Academy, the Guatemalan, Filipino, Chilean, Colombian and Nicaraguan Language and the Hispanic Society of America. Moreover, he was president of the Hispanic Cultural Foundation in the United States and was in possession of the Commandery of the Order of Isabel the Catholic and the Civil Merit in the degree of Number granted by the King of Spain. He also received the Silver Medal of Andalusia in 1989, Freedom Prize of the City of New York (1986), Vasconcelos Award (Mexico-1990) for his work of creation and Medal of Christopher Columbus from the Dominican Republic (1991) Also, the rocianero writer gave his name to a foundation and an International Poetry Competition – the second largest in the province of Huelva, after Juan Ramon Jimenez-. He was also presidente del Círculo de Escritores y Poetas Iberoamericanos (C.W.P.L.) (In English: President's Circle Latin American Writers and Poets (C.E.P.I.))

== Early years ==
Odón Betanzos Palacios was born in Rociana del Condado, in the province of Huelva, Andalusia, Spain, on September 16, 1925. His father was Manuel (Manolo) Betanzos Valencia, and his mother was Caridad Palacios Urquijo, a descendant of an aristocratic Basque family. His father was shot in August 1936 in the Spanish Civil War, when Odón was 10 years old, as he was accused of being a socialist. His literary taste was evident from an early age, showing a great concern in learning so, he read everything that fell into his hands. He earned honors from the time he began to study until high school ended. Dire need and economic hardship overwhelmed his home. His mother had to leave their village to look for ways to rebuild their lives and try to reunite the family, but he could not stand it any longer. He, therefore, decided to abandon their land and travel alone to Madrid in search of work in August 1942, at the age of sixteen. At this young age he began his forced emigration that lasted until 1956 when he settled in New York City (United States).

In Madrid he continued his studies in high school, but his life changed completely by having to work in order to send money home and to also pay for his studies. He had to complete the last three years of high school, 5th, 6th and 7th, for free, studying at night, if and when his work permitted. Surviving was hard, difficult and not very pleasant for the young man at his tender age, with a simultaneous work and study schedule.

There were several jobs. The first one was to keep the accounting of a furniture store, while managing it on Calle Valverde, owned by a family friend of his mother – Caledonian Hernandez -a "good and fair man" who helped him a lot during those years of loneliness, anxiety, hunger and misery.

Since he didn't make enough money by working at this job, he set up a stationery along with a Basque man- Aldamiz – but the experience would be short – just a few months – because of the many difficulties involved in the business at the time.

His first residence was a modest pension in Fuencarral Street where Odon Betanzos found a room to be isolated with his books. Later, his mother decided to settle in Madrid with two of her five children, Manuel and Marisol, and together with Odon, they resided in the home of a sister of his mother's. They finally had their own home.

Among the many difficulties a new one was added: Caledonian Hernandez died and the business disappeared with his death, which meant that Odon lost his job and became wrapped in a sea of confusion. He had to find new employment.

Odon Betanzos made his way through the Merchant Navy career in Cádiz, as he himself said, "to raise my family," as from the 1940s he sailed the seven seas. In 1956, he stopped sailing while in Caracas, Venezuela where, along with two Spanish friends, he formed an import/export company. The deal yielded no results, despite so many efforts, because it needed more capital available to them. It was precisely in the short time he lived in Venezuela – just four months – that he met and became involved with the outstanding figures of the country. Despite the favorable social environment as they moved in those lands, he decided to settle permanently in the New York City because the climate was not propitious. He settled there in 1956 and in this city he received a master's degree in literature (MA) from Fordham University, and a master's in philosophy (M.Ph.) from The City University of New York. In addition, he did his doctoral studies in Philosophy (PhD) at The City University of New York, Graduate School, and he titled his doctoral thesis: "Experiencias vitales en la obra poética de Miguel Hernández" (In Spanish: Experience vital in the poetry of Miguel Hernandez).

== Literary career and later years ==
"Escribir es como estar picado de tarántula; quien está herido no tiene solución; no hay más salida que entregarse por entero a la escritura (...) Nadie se parece a nadie. Al escritor se le conoce por la palabra, que en él tiene que ser esencia" (In English:"Writing is like being bitten by tarantula, he who is injured has no way out, there isn't any other recourse than to surrender himself entirely to writing (...) Nobody's similar to anyone else. The writer is known by the word, that in him must be essential".)

He began his literary career in New York, where he settled in one of his trips along with a group of Spanish exiles who already lived there and he was one of the founders of Editorial Mensaje (Message Editorial) magazine that led until his death. He graduated in Arts (MA) from Fordham University, and Philosophy (PhD) from The City University of New York, where he received his doctorate, and later became a professor of Spanish language and literature of the same institution.

He posted his first poetry book in 1969, which had the title Santidad y guerrería (Holiness and Guerrieri). This was followed by other books that shared the same genre of literature, among which stand Hombre de luz (Man of Light) (1972), La mano universal (The universal hand) (1985) and De ese Dios de las totalidades (This God of wholeness) (1991), among others. In 1981, Betanzos posted his doctoral thesis Experiencias vitales en la obra poética de Miguel Hernández (Life experiences in the poetry of Miguel Hernandez). Between 1980 and 1990, he published that which would be his only novel: Diosdado de lo Alto (novela sobre la Guerra Civil Española, en dos partes, 1980y 1990) (Diosdado on High (novel about the Spanish Civil War, in two parts, 1980 and 1990). In 1986, he was elected president of the foundation that bears his name, based in his hometown, in Huelva.

In the summer of 2007 he had to undergo an operation after a gastric hemorrhage. He died in New York on September 24, 2007, due to heart disease and cancer with which he had been suffering for some years, and he was buried a week later in his hometown in Spain, in Rociana's San Fernando Cemetery, in the family pantheon alongside his only son, Manny. The author had been suffering from health problems since two years prior, when he succumbed to heart surgery for five by-passes. The president of the Betanzos Foundation, Antonio Ramírez, said the writer died in a New York City hospital after several days of agony. In the U.S., he was survived by his wife, Amalia, as well as by the widow of his son.

== Personal life ==
It was in 1952 during one of his trips to New York that he met a woman from Bronx who would become his wife, Amalia Migues, the only daughter of a Spaniard – from Pontevedra, Galicia, who emigrated to America as a child – and of a Puerto Rican mother, from Santurce. Odon Betanzos saw in her his own rebellion, and along with her intelligence, administrative ability, talent and understanding, she became irresistible. At that time, Amalia was a professor of cytology at New York University, a private university. The courtship was brief – just a year or so – and they married on March 21, 1953. On January 14, 1954, his only son was born, and he gave him his father's and his paternal grandfather's name, Manuel. The poet wanted to perpetuate the name of his ancestors in the son God had granted him. Manny wasn't only of high moral integrity and values, but he was also friendly, kind, intelligent, enthusiastic, thoughtful, very generous, and with a wonderful sense of humor. An avid reader, he was a marvelous son and an amazing person who studied literature, history, and social work at college as well as law. Because of the closeness and love they shared, the author was chosen by his son to be his best man the day of his wedding at St. Patrick's Cathedral in NYC, where he married a young lady he had met the first day of college; the same young woman the poet had secretly hoped his son would one day marry. In September 1993, the accidental death of his only son, aged 39, completely crushed Odon, and marked him both personally as well as in his literary work, to the day he died on September 24, 2007, just 14 years after his own son's death.

Odon's father's capture and shooting during the Spanish Civil War, and then decades later, the death of his son, were both very heavy marks in the life of the author and of his literature. Some critics say, it was reflected in his writing due to his life's sorrows and weariness.

During the 1970s, he published poetry, most of them collected in three anthologies: "Santidad y guerrería" (Holiness and Guerrieri), "Hombre de luz" (Man of Light) and "La mano universal" (The universal hand). "Poemas del hombre y las desolaciones" (Likewise, we should point Poems of man and desolation), "De ese Dios de las totalidades" (From the God of wholes), "Antología poética" (Poetic Anthology), " La desolación" ("The desolation), " Sonetos de la muerte" (Sonnets of Death) and a two-volume novel about the Spanish Civil War : "Diosdado de lo alto" (Diosdado from above). He also worked as well extensive teaching, journalism and essays. He published them in magazines and newspapers around half the world. His work has been chosen for doctoral theses in many parts of the world.

== Awards ==
He received many awards throughout his life, among those:

- The Commendation of Isabel the Catholic
- Freedom Prize of the City of New York (1986)
- Silver Medal of Andalusia
- Vasconcelos Award (Mexico-1990)
- Award the Knights Order and of Civil Merit in the degree of Number granted by the King of Spain.
- Order of Christopher Columbus from the Dominican Republic (1991).
- He was declared favorite son of his hometown of Rociana in 1979, where the House of Culture bearing his name, in addition to an existing intellectual foundation based in the locality.

== Legacy ==
His works has been translated, at least in English, Portuguese, French, Italian, Russian, Chinese, Dutch, Arabic, Hebrew and Macedonian.

== Works ==
He has published sixty-six books of poetry. Some of them are:

=== Lyric ===
- Santidad y guerrería (Holiness and Guerrieri), (1969)
- Hombre de luz (Man of Light) (1972)
- La mano universal (Universal Hand) (1985)
- Poemas el hombre y las desolaciones (Poetry man and desolation) (1988)
- De ese Dios de las totalidades (In this God of wholes) (1991)
- Antología poética (Poetic Anthology) (1995)
- Sonetos de la muerte (Sonnets of Death) (2000)

=== Narrative ===
- Diosdado de lo Alto (novela sobre la Guerra Civil Española, en dos partes, 1980 y 1990) (Diosdado on High (novel about the Spanish Civil War, in two parts, 1980 and 1990).

=== Criticism ===
- Experiencias vitales en la obra poética de Miguel Hernández (Life experiences in the poetry of Miguel Hernandez) (1981).

== See also ==
- Académie Belgo-Espagnole d'Histoire
