= Toni Muñoz (footballer, born 1982) =

Spanish footballer

Personal information
- Full name: Antonio Muñoz Llompart
- Date of birth: 13 August 1982 (age 44)
- Place of birth: Manacor, Spain
- Height: 1.76 m (5 ft 9 in)
- Position: Forward

Youth career
- Valencia

Senior career*
Years	Team	Apps	(Gls)
2000–2001	Valencia B		
2001–2002	Logroñés	11	(0)
2002–2003	Burriana		
2003–2004	Manacor		
2004–2005	Novelda	22	(2)
2005–2007	Mallorca B		
2005	Mallorca	1	(0)
2007	Manacor		
2007–2008	AEL		
2008	Mataró	1	(0)
2008–2011	Cala d'Or		
2011–2013	Felanitx	55	(8)
- * Club domestic league appearances and goals

Antonio "Toni" Muñoz Llompart (born 13 August 1982) is a Spanish former professional footballer who played as a forward.

== Club career ==
Muñoz was born in Manacor, Balearic Islands. During his career, spent mostly in the Spanish lower leagues, he played once in La Liga, featuring for Mallorca in a 1–0 home defeat against Deportivo de La Coruña on 28 August 2005.

Muñoz's other professional season was with Super League Greece club Athlitiki Enosi Larissa, following which he returned to his country in 2008.

== Personal life ==
Toni was the younger brother of another footballer, Xisco Muñoz.
