= Rayco García =

Spanish footballer

Rayco
Personal information
- Full name: Rayco García Dauta
- Date of birth: 23 March 1987 (age 39)
- Place of birth: Las Palmas, Spain
- Height: 1.65 m (5 ft 5 in)
- Position: Forward

Youth career
- Real Madrid

Senior career*
Years	Team	Apps	(Gls)
2005–2006	Real Madrid C	35	(18)
2006–2007	Real Madrid B	22	(4)
2007–2008	Villarreal B	29	(1)
2008–2009	Navalcarnero	37	(13)
2009–2010	Oviedo	30	(4)
2010–2012	Rayo Vallecano B	54	(15)
2011–2012	Rayo Vallecano	6	(0)
2012–2013	Mirandés	20	(1)
2013–2014	Alcoyano	34	(14)
2014–2016	Gimnàstic	47	(14)
2016–2017	Ponferradina	20	(1)
2017	Murcia	15	(2)
2017–2020	Logroñés	73	(22)
2020–2021	Calahorra	24	(1)
2021–2022	San Fernando	25	(3)
Total		471	(113)

International career
2002	Spain U16	4	(1)
2005	Spain U17	2	(1)
- * Club domestic league appearances and goals

Rayco García Dauta (born 23 March 1987), known simply as Rayco, is a Spanish former professional footballer who played as a forward.

== Club career ==
Born in Las Palmas, Canary Islands, Rayco began his football career with Real Madrid, first helping the Juvenil side win the Champions Cup then leading all scorers in the C team with 18 goals. He made his professional debut in 2006–07, appearing for Real Madrid Castilla in the Segunda División; during the season, the player was brought mainly from the bench as they were relegated.

After spells with Villarreal CF's reserves and amateurs CDA Navalcarnero, Rayco moved to Real Oviedo, recently promoted to Segunda División B. For 2010–11 he signed with another club in that league, Rayo Vallecano's B side.

On 11 December 2011, Rayco made his first-team – and La Liga – debut, playing the second half of a 1–3 home loss against Sporting de Gijón. He terminated his contract in March of the following year and, shortly after, joined second-division CD Mirandés.

Rayco competed in the third tier subsequently, representing CD Alcoyano, Gimnàstic de Tarragona, SD Ponferradina, Real Murcia CF, UD Logroñés and CD Calahorra. In summer 2021, the 34-year-old joined UD San Fernando in the Segunda Federación one level below.
