= Alberto Varo =

Spanish footballer

Personal information
- Full name: Alberto Varo Lara
- Date of birth: 18 March 1993 (age 33)
- Place of birth: Tarragona, Spain
- Height: 1.90 m (6 ft 3 in)
- Position: Goalkeeper

Team information
- Current team: Nea Salamina
- Number: 1

Youth career
- 2004–2012: Gimnàstic

Senior career*
Years	Team	Apps	(Gls)
2012–2016	Pobla Mafumet	89	(1)
2014–2018	Gimnàstic	4	(0)
2016–2018	→ Barcelona B (loan)	21	(0)
2018–2021	Lugo	10	(0)
2022–2023	Linense	40	(0)
2023–2025	Gimnàstic	55	(0)
2025–	Nea Salamina	29	(0)
- * Club domestic league appearances and goals as of 3 May 2026

Alberto Varo Lara (born 18 March 1993) is a Spanish professional footballer who plays as a goalkeeper for Cypriot club Nea Salamina.

== Football career ==
Born in Tarragona, Catalonia, Varo joined Gimnàstic's youth setup in 2004, aged 11. He made his debuts as a senior with the farm team in the 2012–13 campaign, in the Tercera División.

On 27 February 2014, after both Manolo Reina and Tomeu Nadal were unavailable, Varo was called up to the main squad for a Segunda División B match against Valencia Mestalla. Three days later he made his debut, starting in the 2–2 away draw.

On 8 July 2015, after being a key defensive unit for the B-side in its promotion to the third level, Varo signed a new three-year deal with Nàstic. On 6 September, he saved a penalty and also scored the equalizer for Pobla in a 1–1 draw against Badalona.

On 28 February 2016, as Reina was suspended and Nadal left in the previous transfer window, Varo made his professional debut by playing the full 90 minutes in a 1–1 Segunda División away draw against Real Valladolid. On 29 June, he was loaned to Barcelona B for one year.

On 10 July 2018, Varo signed a two-year contract with Lugo. He was mainly used as a backup to Juan Carlos and Ander Cantero during his spell, and terminated his contract on 25 August 2021.

On 25 December 2021, after nearly six months without a club, Varo joined Primera División RFEF side Linense. On 13 June 2023, after the club's relegation, he returned to Nàstic on a two-year deal, with the club now also in division three.

On 10 July 2025, free agent Varo moved abroad for the first time in his career, signing a one-year deal with Cypriot First Division side Nea Salamina.
