= Iago Bouzón =

Spanish footballer

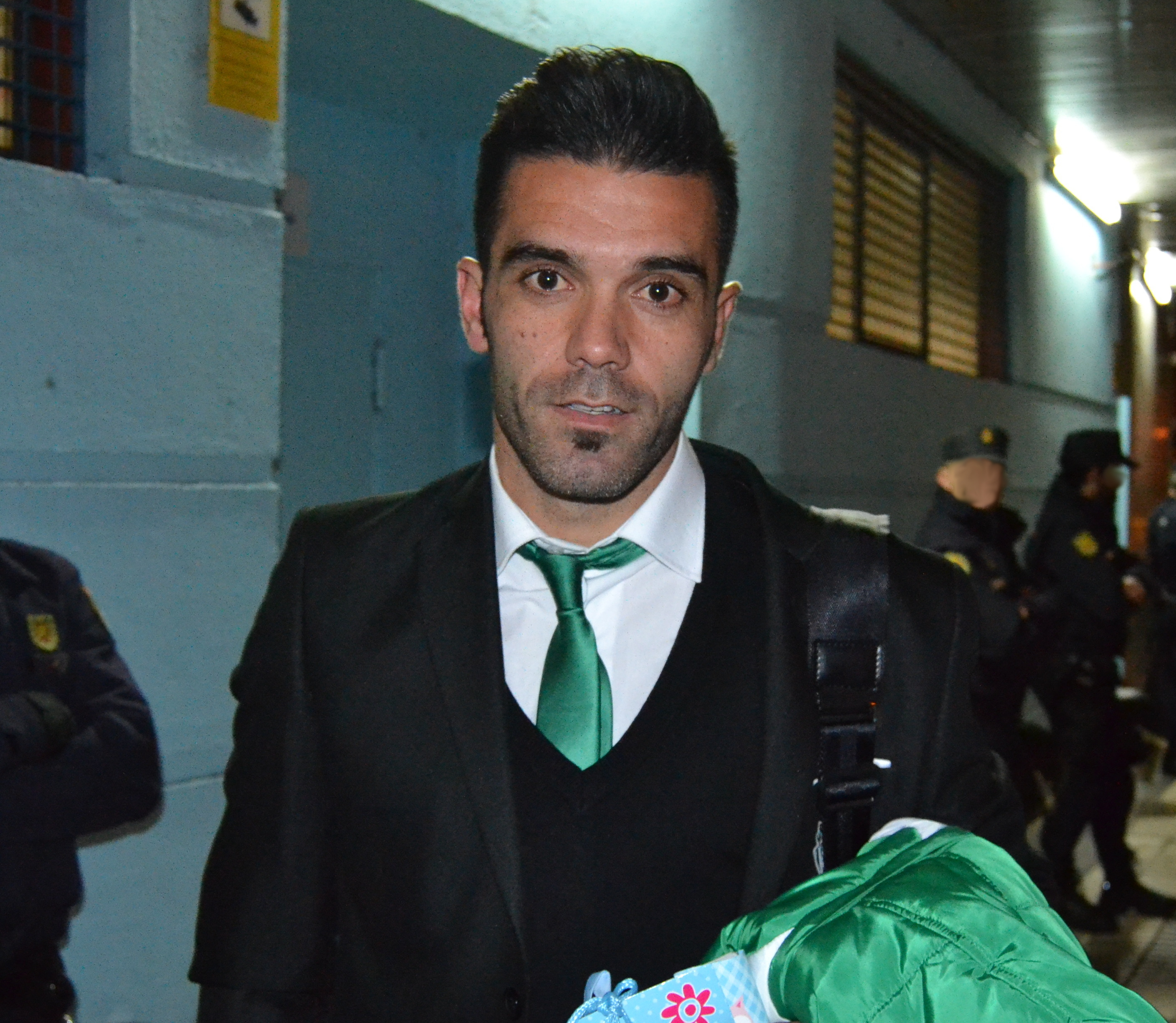
- Bouzón in 2015

Personal information
- Full name: Iago Bouzón Amoedo
- Date of birth: 17 March 1983 (age 43)
- Place of birth: Redondela, Spain
- Height: 1.82 m (6 ft 0 in)
- Position: Defender

Youth career
- Celta

Senior career*
Years	Team	Apps	(Gls)
1999–2004	Celta B	54	(1)
2000–2006	Celta	11	(0)
2005–2006	→ Recreativo (loan)	24	(0)
2006–2010	Recreativo	91	(2)
2010–2012	Omonia	21	(1)
2012–2013	Xerez	28	(0)
2013–2015	Córdoba	31	(1)
2015–2017	Gimnàstic	51	(1)
Total		311	(6)

International career
2000	Spain U16	3	(0)
2001	Spain U17	2	(0)
2003	Spain U20	7	(0)
2004	Spain U21	2	(0)
- * Club domestic league appearances and goals

Iago Bouzón Amoedo (born 17 March 1983) is a Spanish former professional footballer who played as a versatile defender.

== Club career ==
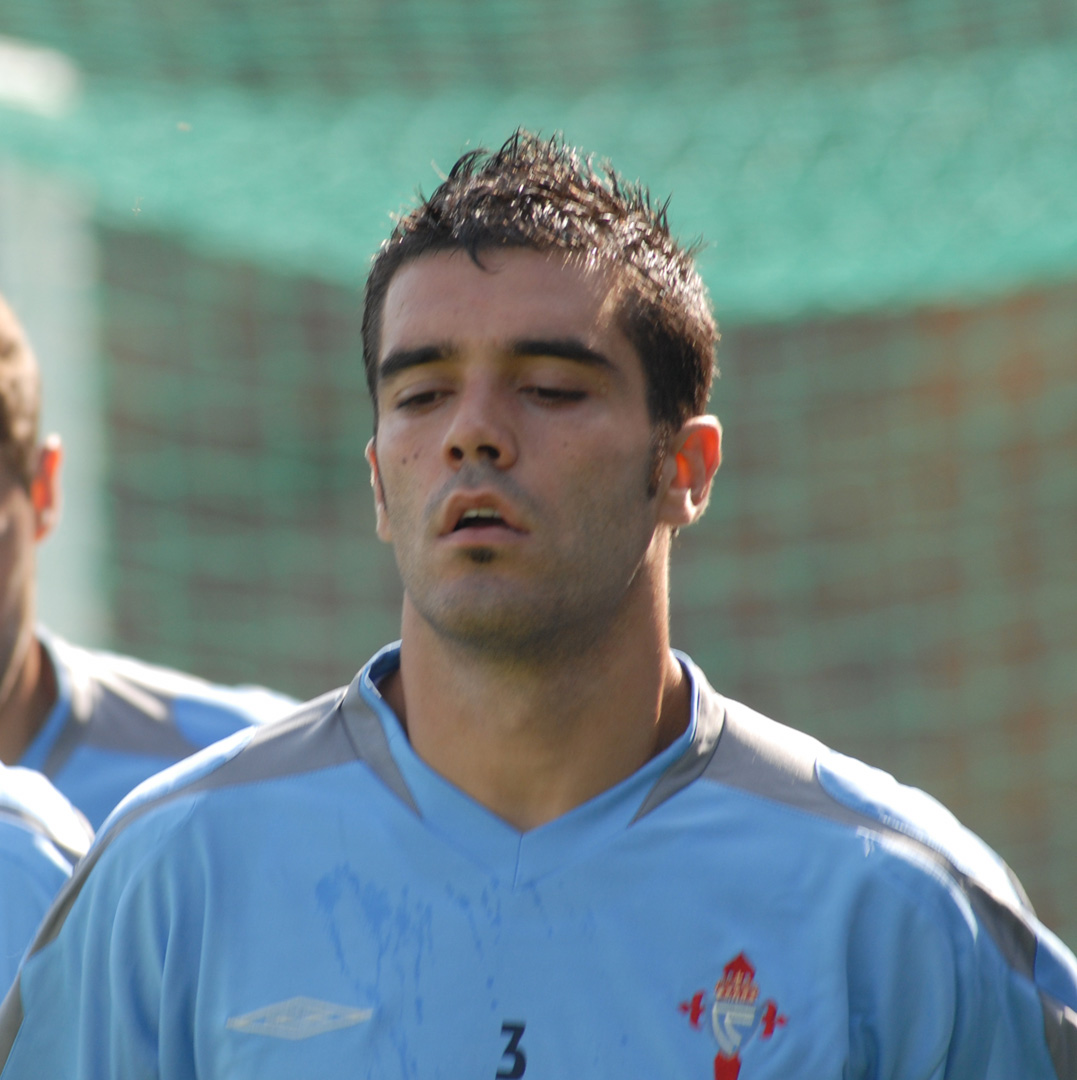
Bouzón training with Celta in 2007

Born in Redondela, Province of Pontevedra, Bouzón made his professional debut for local powerhouse RC Celta de Vigo four days shy of his 17th birthday, but would only total four first-team appearances in his first five years, playing mainly with the reserves. He also featured rarely in the 2004–05 season, as the Galician club returned to La Liga after one year out.

Bouzón joined Recreativo de Huelva in summer 2005, initially on loan. He was an important defensive element for an Andalusia side that achieved top-flight promotion in the 2005–06 campaign.

In late June 2010, after experiencing one of his best seasons as a professional – 30 matches, two goals, although Recre could only finish ninth in the Segunda División– Bouzón signed as a free agent with AC Omonia of the Cypriot First Division. In November, he suffered a serious injury that sidelined him for eight months.

Bouzón subsequently returned to Spain and its second division, representing Xerez CD, Córdoba CF and Gimnàstic de Tarragona. He promoted to the top tier with the second of those clubs at the end of 2013–14 via the play-offs, contributing 32 appearances and one goal to the feat.

== International career ==
Bouzón represented Spain at the 2003 FIFA World Youth Championship held in the United Arab Emirates. He only missed one game in seven for the runners-up.

On 17 February 2004, Bouzón earned the first of two caps for the under-21s, playing the first 45 minutes of a 2–1 friendly win against Norway.

== Honours ==
Recreativo

- Segunda División: 2005–06

Omonia

- Cypriot Cup: 2011–12
- Cypriot Super Cup: 2010

Spain U20

- FIFA U-20 World Cup runner-up: 2003
