= David Rocha =

Spanish footballer

Personal information
- Full name: David Mateos Rocha
- Date of birth: 7 February 1985 (age 41)
- Place of birth: Cáceres, Spain
- Height: 1.79 m (5 ft 10 1/2 in)
- Position: Midfielder

Team information
- Current team: CD Extremadura (manager)

Youth career
- Cacereño

Senior career*
Years	Team	Apps	(Gls)
2003–2005	Cacereño	61	(8)
2005–2008	Villarreal B		
2008	Cartagena	13	(2)
2008–2011	Cacereño	96	(17)
2011–2013	Albacete	79	(6)
2013–2016	Gimnàstic	99	(16)
2016	Houston Dynamo	4	(0)
2016–2018	Oviedo	63	(3)
2018–2019	Gimnàstic	18	(0)
2019	Almería	10	(0)
2019–2021	Extremadura UD	30	(1)
2021–2022	Mérida	28	(0)
Total		457	(44)

Managerial career
- 2023: Mérida (caretaker)
- 2023–2024: Mérida
- 2026–: CD Extremadura
- * Club domestic league appearances and goals

David Mateos Rocha (born 7 February 1985) is a Spanish retired footballer who played as a central midfielder, and is the current manager of CD Extremadura.

== Playing career ==
Born in Cáceres, Extremadura, Rocha started playing football in CP Cacereño's youth system, and made his debuts as a senior in the 2002–03 campaign, in Segunda División B. In 2005, he moved to Villarreal CF B in Tercera División, appearing regularly for the side.

On 11 January 2008 Rocha joined FC Cartagena in the third level. On 15 July he returned to Cacereño, with the side now in the fourth division, winning promotion in his first season.

On 14 July 2011 Rocha signed for Albacete Balompié, after being team captain at his previous club. On 26 June 2013 he moved to fellow third division side Gimnàstic de Tarragona, signing a two-year deal.

On 19 June 2015, after winning promotion to Segunda División with Nàstic, Rocha renewed his link until 2018. He made his professional debut on 23 August, starting in a 2–2 home draw against former club Albacete.

On 21 January 2016 Rocha moved abroad for the first time in his career, after agreeing to a three-year deal with Major League Soccer side Houston Dynamo. On 6 July 2016, he mutually terminated his contract with Dynamo after alleging "family reasons".

On 11 July 2016 Rocha returned to Spain and its second tier, after agreeing to a two-year deal with Real Oviedo. On 4 July 2018 he terminated his contract, and returned to Gimnàstic just hours later.

Rocha cut ties with Nàstic on 24 January 2019, and signed a short-term deal with fellow league team UD Almería just hours later. On 2 July, he signed a two-year contract with Extremadura UD, still in the second division.

Unregistered for the first half of the 2020–21 season due to an injury, and moved to Mérida AD on 13 January 2021. He agreed to a new one-year deal with the latter on 10 June, but retired at the age of 36 on 3 February 2022, immediately joining Mérida's backroom staff.

== Managerial career ==
After working as a sporting director at his last club Mérida, Rocha was named caretaker manager on 9 October 2023, after Rai Rosa was sacked. He returned to his previous role after the appointment of Manuel Ruano, but was appointed in charge of the club until the end of the season on 12 December.

On 24 May 2024, after avoiding relegation, Rocha returned to his sporting director role. He left the Romans on 12 June 2025, before being appointed CD Extremadura manager the following 12 January.

On 7 May 2026, after helping Extremadura to achieve their first-ever promotion to division three, Rocha renewed his contract for a further year.

== Managerial statistics ==
As of 6 November 2026

Managerial record by team and tenure
Team	Nat	From	To	Record								Ref
Team	Nat	From	To	G	W	D	L	GF	GA	GD	Win %	Ref
Mérida (caretaker)	(Spain)	9 October 2023	31 October 2023	3	0	1	2	2	4	−2	0.00	
Mérida	(Spain)	12 December 2023	24 May 2024	22	9	8	5	26	23	+3	40.91	
Extremadura	(Spain)	12 January 2026	Present	28	16	6	6	53	30	+23	57.14	
Total				53	25	15	13	81	57	+24	47.17	—
