= Nou Estadi Costa Daurada =

Multi-purpose stadium in Tarragona, Spain

Nou Estadi
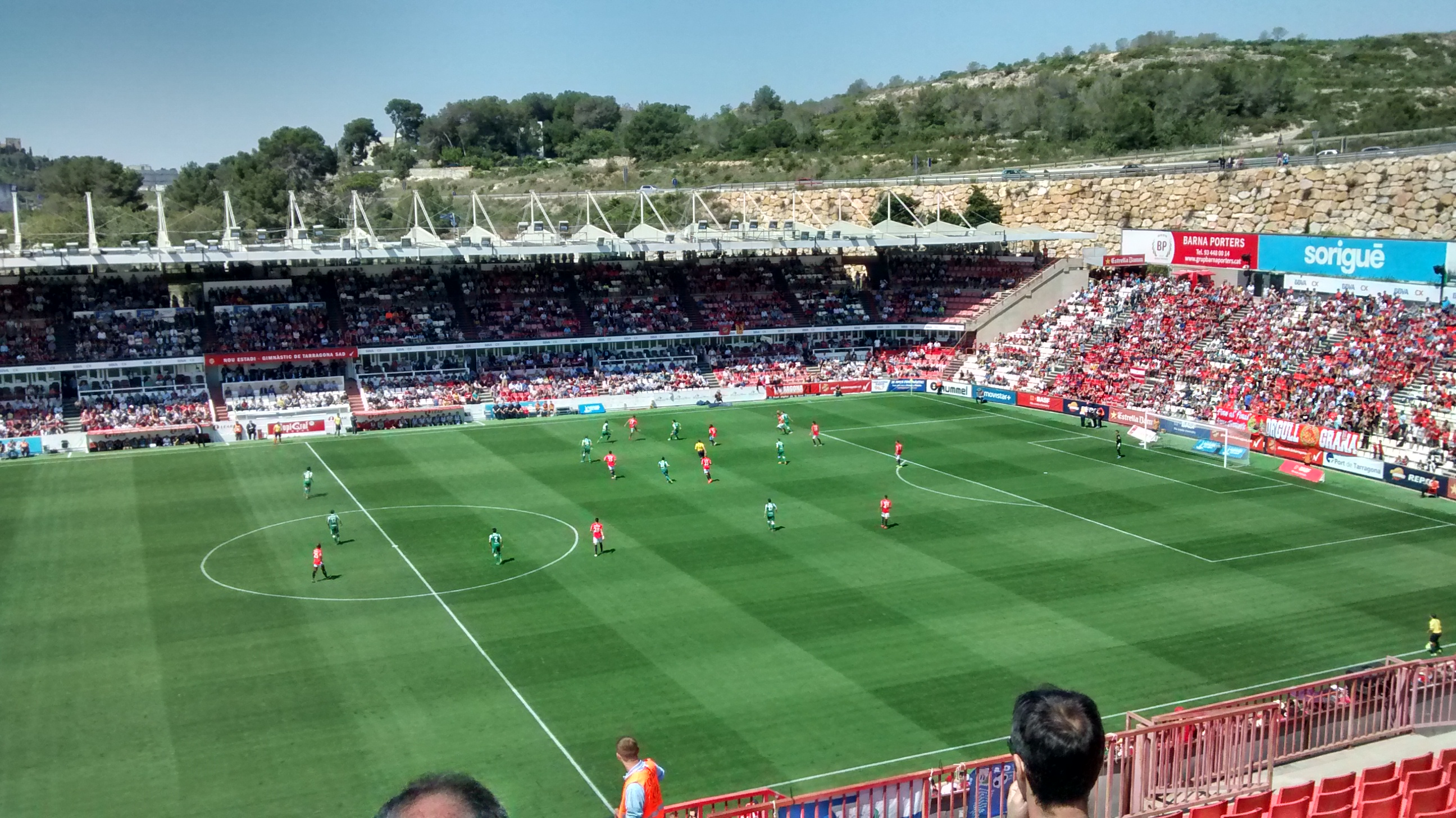
- Interactive map of Nou Estadi
- Full name: Nou Estadi Costa Daurada
- Former names: Nou Estadi de Tarragona (1972–2022)
- Location: Tarragona, Catalonia, Spain
- Coordinates: 41°7′37″N 1°16′22″E
- Owner: Ajuntament de Tarragona
- Operator: Ajuntament de Tarragona
- Capacity: 14,591
- Field size: 102 by 67 metres (112 yd × 73 yd)

Construction
- Opened: 1972

Tenant
- Gimnàstic de Tarragona

Nou Estadi Costa Daurada is a multi-purpose stadium in Tarragona, Catalonia, Spain. It is currently used mostly for football matches and is the home ground of the Gimnàstic de Tarragona. The stadium has a maximum capacity of 14,591 people.

It hosted opening and closing ceremonies of the 2018 Mediterranean Games.

== Images ==
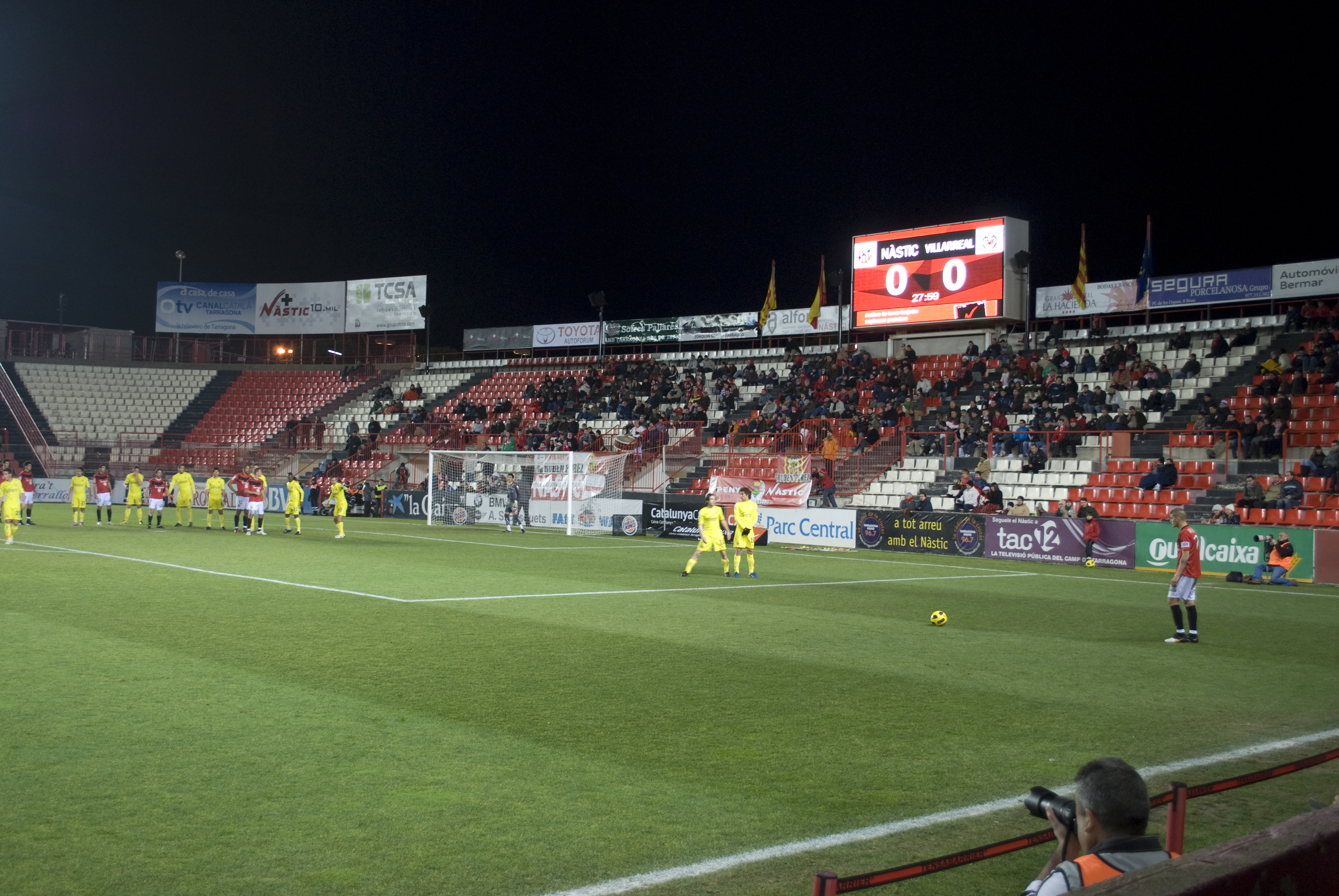
Free kick in a match between Gimnastic de Tarragona and Villarreal B.

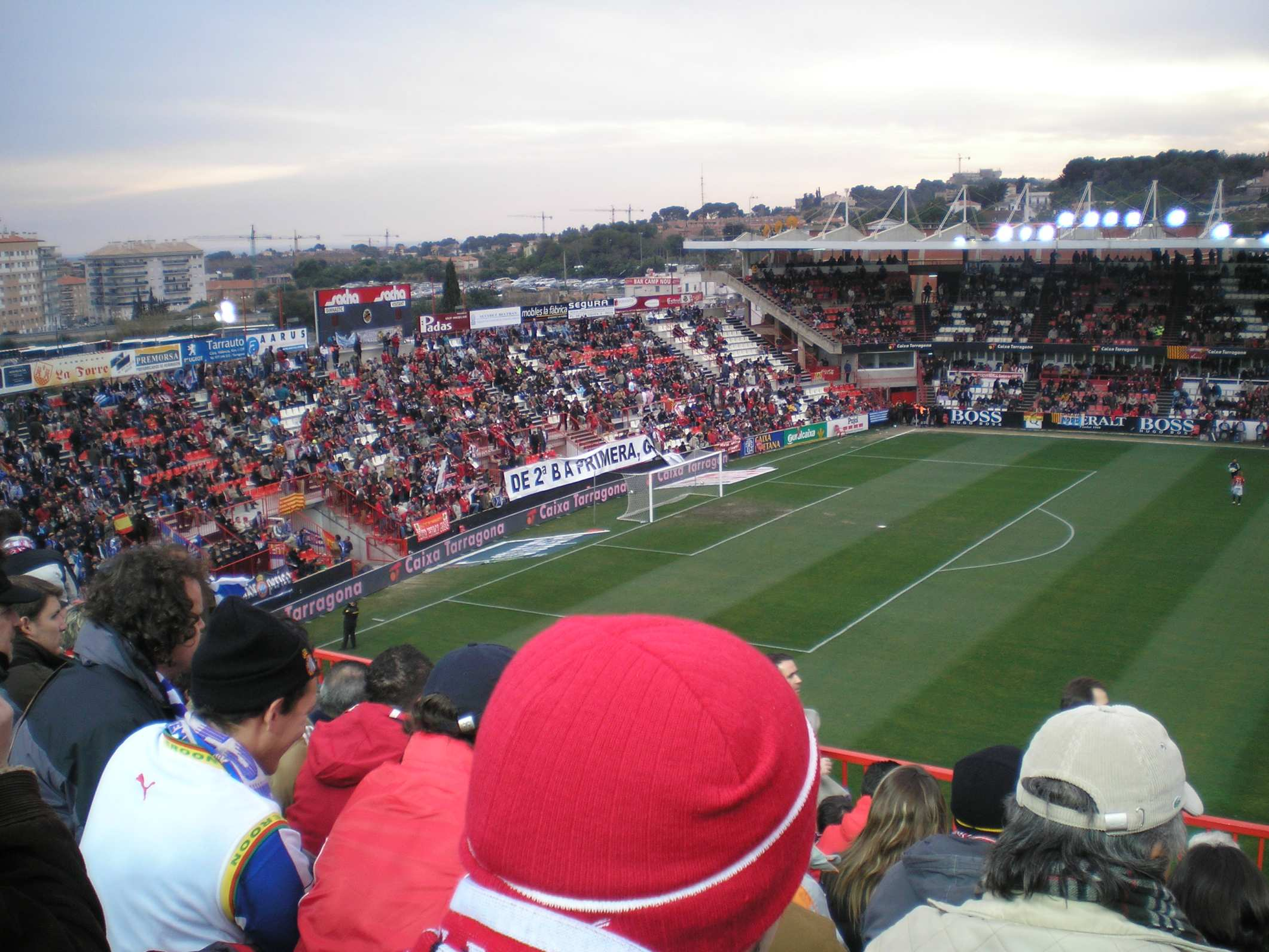
View from upper stand

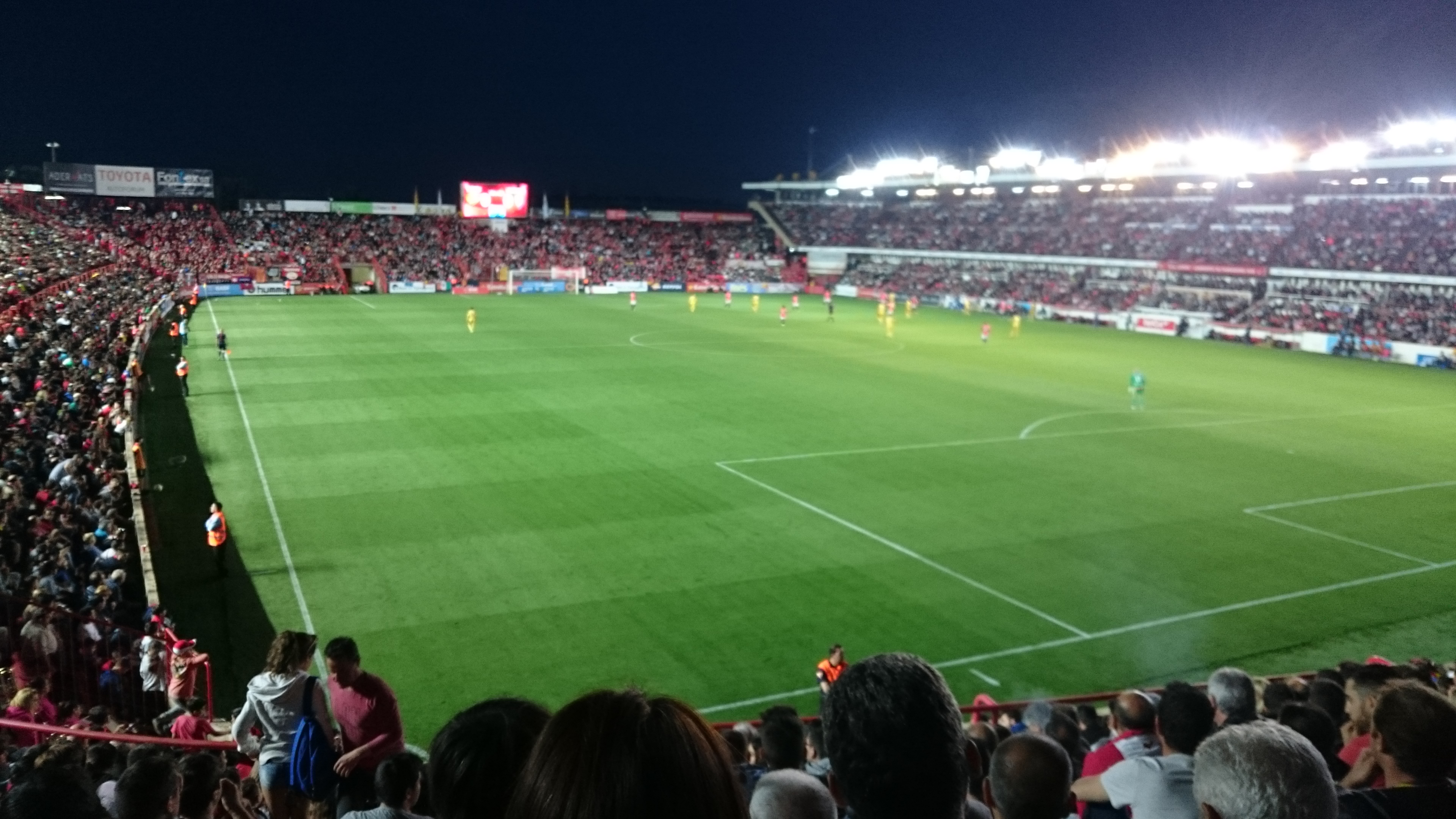
Match against CA Osasuna

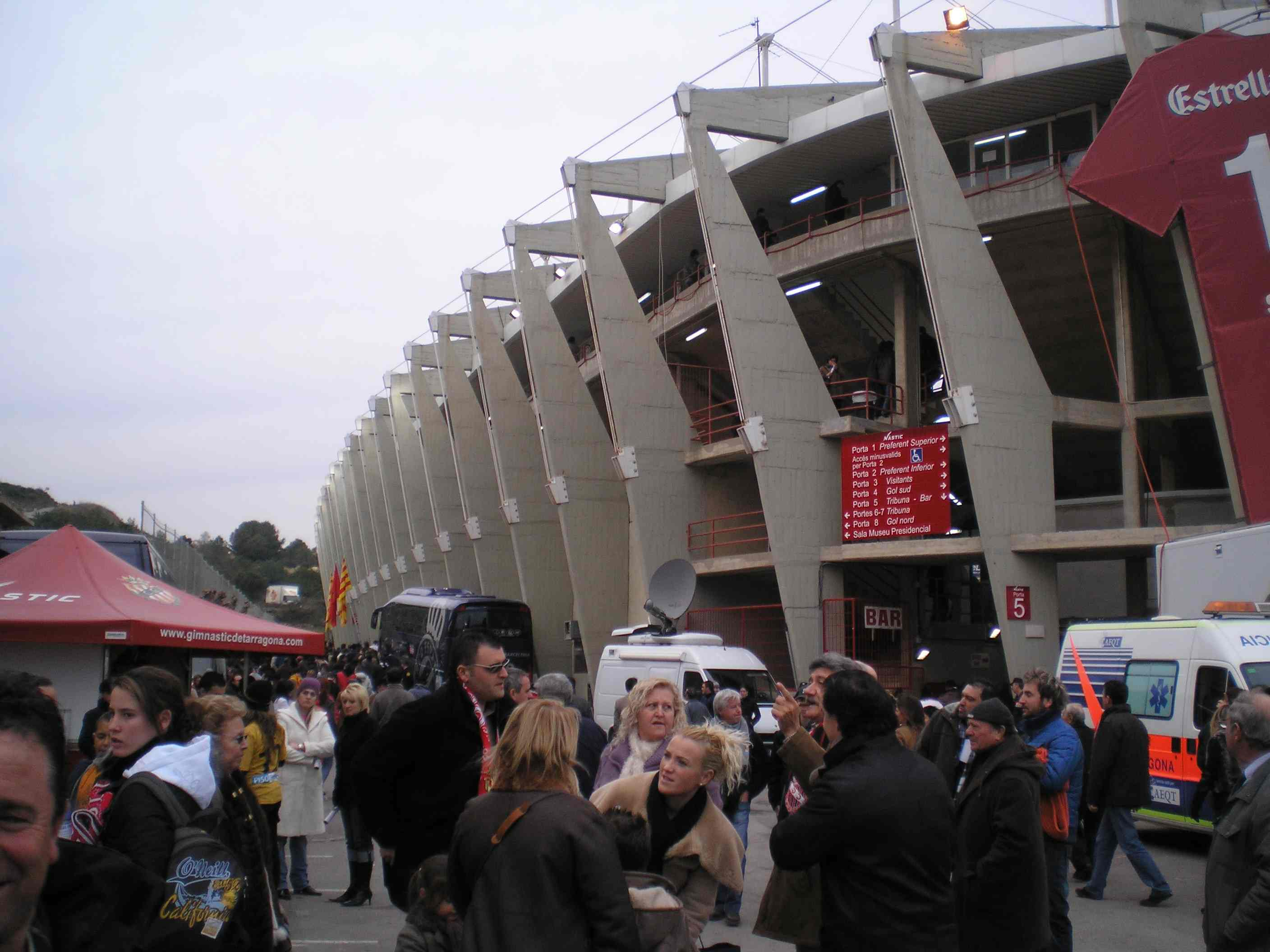
Outside the stadium.

Preceded by Mersin Arena; Mersin	Mediterranean Games; Final Venue; 2018	Succeeded by Olympic Stadium; Oran
