= Rociana del Condado =

Coordinates: 37°18′29″N 6°35′55″W

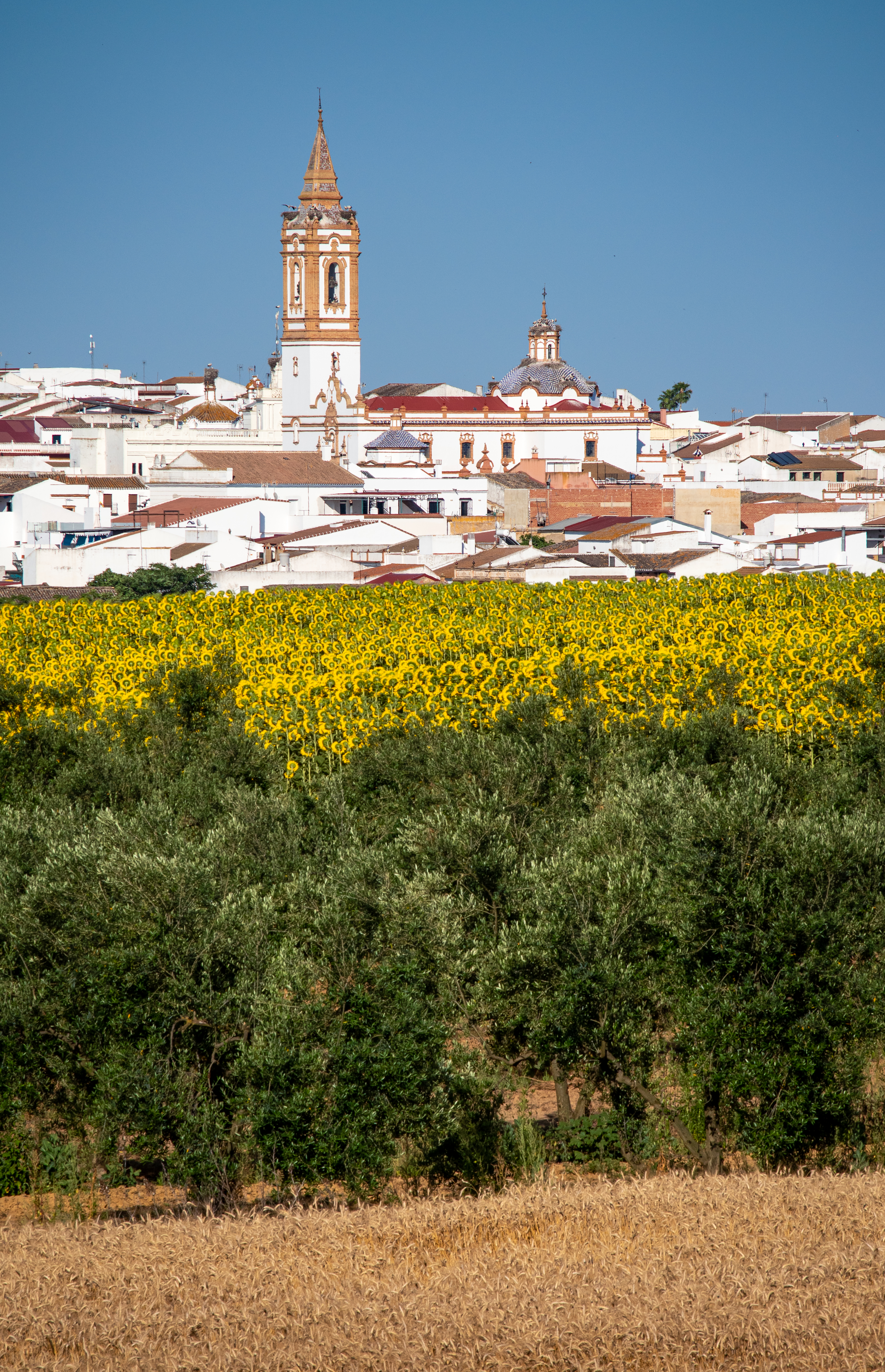
- Sunflowers, cereals and olive trees in Rociana del Condado.

- Flag Coat of arms

- Location in Spain.
- Country: Spain
- Autonomous community: Andalusia
- Province: Huelva

Area
  - Total: 74 km^{2} (29 sq mi)
- Elevation: 110 m (360 ft)

Population (2025-01-01)
  - Total: 8,024
  - Density: 110/km^{2} (280/sq mi)
- Time zone: UTC+1 (CET)
  - Summer (DST): UTC+2 (CEST)
- Website: http://www.rocianadelcondado.es/es/

Rociana del Condado is a town located in the province of Huelva, Andalusia, Spain.

== Geography ==
Rociana del Condado belongs to the Judicial District of La Palma del Condado. It is located 37 km from the capital, its area is 70.7 km2 and has a population of 6863 inhabitants. The province's major industries are agriculture and construction. It is perhaps best known for its wine, with over two hundred vineyards and two major cooperatives. The traditional agriculture is diversified: the north are planted and cultivated sunflowers, cereals and olive trees in the center south citrus and almond orchards.

== Population ==
Rociana has a population of 6863 inhabitants according to 2006 census data, of which 3541 are men and 1,322 women. Foreigners are very few and are counted in 738 people, mostly from Romania. The town's patron is the Virgen del Socorro. Among its illustrious sons is the well-known academic Odón Betanzos Palacios.

== History ==
Rociana has been inhabited since the Neolithic. However, the first historical information Rociana appears to come from Roman times. The Romans gave this province with the name of Ponciana. The name of the place was transformed over time; as such, it was called Rociana and later Rociana del Condado, a name that has been preserved until today. The province was invaded by Romans, Visigoths and Muslims. Apparently, after the Muslim invasions and the reign of Mafot Aben, Rociana was a village belonging to the Kingdom of Taifa of Lebre or the Algarve, with its capital at Niebla. In 1262, due to the conquest of Niebla by Alfonso X, Taifa territory became part of the Castilian kingdoms, so the subject population was part of the Christian culture that still reigned in Castile. Following the granting of Royal Jurisdiction Castilian King Alfonso X the Council gave to the city of Niebla, Rociana got all the grants, perks and privileges that were granted royal for the repopulation of newly conquered territories and border territories of Muslims. But in 1368, the city of Niebla was in the hands of a secular government. At this stage Rociana fought constantly against neighboring towns who were trying to expand their territories by invading, among other places, Rociana. Later, from the sixteenth century and under the Old Regime, Rociana del Condado attracted a large population and economic growth through trade with the peninsula and the Americas. In 1833 Rociana got political autonomy from Niebla and Medina Manor due to the arrival of the Law of Lordships, through which all jurisdictional lordships were eliminated.

== See also ==
- List of municipalities in Huelva
