= 2023 Tokushima Vortis season =

Tokushima Vortis
2023 season
- Owner: Otsuka Pharmaceutical
- Chairman: Kazuhiro Kishida
- Manager: Beñat Labaien
- Stadium: Pocarisweat Stadium
- J2 League: 19th
- Emperor's Cup: Second round
- All statistics correct as of 13 May 2023.

The 2023 season was Tokushima Vortis's 68th season in existence and the club's second consecutive season in the second division of Japanese football. In addition to the domestic league, Tokushima Vortis participated in this season's edition of the Emperor's Cup.

== Players ==
=== First-team squad ===
As of 12 May 2023.

Note: Flags indicate national team as defined under FIFA eligibility rules; some limited exceptions apply. Players may hold more than one non-FIFA nationality.

No.	Pos.	Nation	Player
1	GK	ESP	José Aurelio Suárez
2	DF	JPN	Taiki Tamukai
3	DF	JPN	Ryoga Ishio
4	DF	JPN	Takashi Abe
5	DF	JPN	Hidenori Ishii
6	MF	JPN	Kohei Uchida
7	MF	JPN	Eiji Shirai
8	FW	JPN	Yoichiro Kakitani
9	FW	JPN	Kaito Mori (on loan from Kashiwa Reysol)
10	MF	JPN	Taro Sugimoto
11	MF	JPN	Koki Sugimori
13	MF	JPN	Yushi Hasegawa
14	DF	BRA	Cacá
15	FW	JPN	Akito Tanahashi
16	FW	JPN	Daiki Watari
17	FW	JPN	Soya Takada (on loan from Omiya Ardija)
18	DF	BRA	Elsinho
19	FW	JPN	Kanta Chiba (on loan from Shimizu S-Pulse)
20	MF	JPN	Shunto Kodama
21	GK	JPN	Hayate Tanaka

No.	Pos.	Nation	Player
22	DF	DOM	Luismi Quezada
23	MF	JPN	Rio Hyeon
24	MF	JPN	Kazuki Nishiya
25	MF	JPN	Yudai Yamashita
26	DF	JPN	Kodai Mori
27	MF	JPN	Tatsunori Sakurai (on loan from Vissel Kobe)
28	DF	JPN	Towa Nishisaka
30	FW	JPN	Kiyoshiro Tsuboi
31	GK	JPN	Toru Hasegawa
32	MF	JPN	Ryo Toyama
33	MF	JPN	Keita Nakano
34	FW	NGR	Oriola Sunday
37	MF	JPN	Akira Hamashita
39	FW	JPN	Taiyo Nishino
40	GK	JPN	Naoki Goto
41	DF	JPN	Noriki Fuke
—	DF	JPN	Hayato Aoki ^{DSP}
—	GK	JPN	Yamato Kondo ^{Type 2}
—	GK	JPN	Kaisei Kuroda ^{Type 2}

=== Out on loan ===
Note: Flags indicate national team as defined under FIFA eligibility rules; some limited exceptions apply. Players may hold more than one non-FIFA nationality.

No.	Pos.	Nation	Player
—	GK	JPN	Koki Matsuzawa (at Vegalta Sendai)
—	DF	JPN	Naoto Arai (at Cerezo Osaka)
—	MF	JPN	Masaki Watai (at Boavista FC)
—	MF	JPN	Hiroshi Omori (at Fukushima United)

No.	Pos.	Nation	Player
—	MF	JPN	Rin Morita (at FC Ryukyu)
—	FW	JPN	Shiryu Fujiwara (at FC Ryukyu)
—	FW	JPN	Shinnosuke Katsushima (at Girona FC)
—	FW	JPN	Wadi Ibrahim Suzuki (at CF Badalona)

== Transfers ==
Transfers in
Join on	Pos.	Player	Moving from	Transfer type
12 May	DF	(Japan) Hayato Aoki	(Japan) Nihon University	Loan transfer; DSP
Pre-season	GK	(Japan) Naoki Goto	(Japan) Tochigi City	Loan return
Pre-season	DF	(Panama) Luismi Quezada	(Uzbekistan) Surkhon Termez	Free transfer
Pre-season	DF	(Japan) Towa Nishisaka	(Japan) Riseisha HS	Free transfer
Pre-season	DF	(Japan) Noriki Fuke	(Japan) FC Imabari	Loan return
Pre-season	MF	(Japan) Keita Nakano	(Japan) Kyoto Sanga	Full transfer
Pre-season	MF	(Japan) Ryo Toyama	(Japan) Matsumoto Yamaga	Full transfer
Pre-season	MF	(Japan) Yudai Yamashita	(Japan) Waseda University	Free transfer
Pre-season	MF	(Japan) Soya Takada	(Japan) Omiya Ardija	Loan transfer
Pre-season	FW	(Japan) Daiki Watari	(Japan) Avispa Fukuoka	Full transfer
Pre-season	FW	(Japan) Yoichiro Kakitani	(Japan) Nagoya Grampus	Full transfer
Pre-season	FW	(Japan) Akito Tanahashi	(Japan) Kokushikan University	Free transfer
Pre-season	FW	(Japan) Kaito Mori	(Japan) Kashiwa Reysol	Loan transfer
Pre-season	FW	(Japan) Kanta Chiba	(Japan) Shimizu S-Pulse	Loan transfer

Transfers out
Leave on	Pos.	Player	Moving to	Transfer type
9 Mar	GK	(Japan) Koki Matsuzawa	(Japan) Vegalta Sendai	Loan transfer
Pre-season	DF	(Japan) Daisei Suzuki	(Japan) Nara Club	Free transfer
Pre-season	DF	(Japan) Yudai Okuda	(Japan) Kamatamare Sanuki	Free transfer
Pre-season	DF	(Japan) Naoto Arai	(Japan) Cerezo Osaka	Loan transfer
Pre-season	MF	(Japan) Chie Edoojon Kawakami	(Japan) Thespakusatsu Gunma	Full transfer
Pre-season	MF	(Japan) Ken Iwao	(Japan) Urawa Red Diamonds	Full transfer; Loan made permanent
Pre-season	MF	(Japan) Rin Morita	(Japan) FC Ryukyu	Loan transfer
Pre-season	MF	(Japan) Seiya Fujita	–	Retirement
Pre-season	FW	(Norway) Mushaga Bakenga	(Norway) Stabæk	Free transfer
Pre-season	FW	(Japan) Kazunari Ichimi	(Japan) Kyoto Sanga	Full transfer
Pre-season	FW	(Japan) Taichi Takeda	(Japan) FC Osaka	Full transfer; Loan made permanent
Pre-season	FW	(Japan) Shiryu Fujiwara	(Japan) FC Ryukyu	Loan transfer
Pre-season	FW	(Japan) Shota Fujio	(Japan) Cerezo Osaka	Loan expiration
Pre-season	FW	(Japan) Akihiro Sato	–	Retired

== Competitions ==
=== Overview ===
Competition	First match	Last match	Starting round	Record							
Competition	First match	Last match	Starting round	Pld	W	D	L	GF	GA	GD	Win %
J2 League	19 February 2023	12 November 2023	Matchday 1	15	2	8	5	15	22	−7	13.33
Emperor's Cup	7 June 2023		Second round	0	0	0	0	0	0	+0	—
Total				15	2	8	5	15	22	−7	13.33

Last updated: 13 May 2023
Source: Soccerway

=== J2 League ===
==== League table ====
Pos	Team	Pld	W	D	L	GF	GA	GD	Pts
13	Blaublitz Akita	42	12	15	15	37	44	−7	51
14	Roasso Kumamoto	42	13	10	19	52	53	−1	49
15	Tokushima Vortis	42	10	19	13	43	53	−10	49
16	Vegalta Sendai	42	12	12	18	48	61	−13	48
17	Mito HollyHock	42	11	14	17	49	66	−17	47

Source: Meiji Yasuda J2 League, J.League Data Site
Rules for classification: 1) Points; 2) Goal difference; 3) Goals scored; 4) Head-to-head points; 5) Head-to-head goal difference; 6) Head-to-head goal scored; 7) Fair-play points.

==== Results summary ====
Overall								Home						Away					
Pld	W	D	L	GF	GA	GD	Pts	W	D	L	GF	GA	GD	W	D	L	GF	GA	GD
15	2	8	5	15	22	−7	14	0	4	4	3	12	−9	2	4	1	12	10	+2

Last updated: 13 May 2023.
Source: Worldfootball

==== Results by round ====
Round	1	2	3	4	5	6	7	8	9	10	11	12	13	14	15
Ground	H	A	H	H	A	H	A	A	H	H	A	A	H	A	A
Result	L	D	D	L	L	D	D	D	L	L	D	W	D	W	D
Position	18	16	16	20	22	22	22	22	22	22	22	22	22	20	19

Updated to match(es) played on 13 May 2023. Source: Worldfootball
A = Away; H = Home; W = Win; D = Draw; L = Loss

==== Matches ====
The league fixtures were announced on 20 January 2023.

19 February 2023 1	Tokushima Vortis	1–2	Oita Trinita	Naruto
13:00				Stadium: Pocarisweat Stadium; Attendance: 12,070; Referee: Tetsuro Yoshida

25 February 2023 2	Ventforet Kofu	1–1	Tokushima Vortis	Kōfu
12:00				Stadium: JIT Recycle Ink Stadium; Attendance: 5,633; Referee: Yosuke Kubota

4 March 2023 3	Tokushima Vortis	1–1	Vegalta Sendai	Naruto
13:00				Stadium: Pocarisweat Stadium; Attendance: 5,553; Referee: Dai Matsumoto

12 March 2023 4	Tokushima Vortis	0–2	Tokyo Verdy	Naruto
13:00				Stadium: Pocarisweat Stadium; Attendance: 6,006; Referee: Dai Matsumoto

19 March 2023 5	Iwaki FC	1–0	Tokushima Vortis	Iwaki
13:00				Stadium: Iwaki Greenfield Stadium; Attendance: 3,100; Referee: Hiroyoshi Takayama

25 March 2023 6	Tokushima Vortis	0–0	Blaublitz Akita	Naruto
13:00				Stadium: Pocarisweat Stadium

2 April 2023 7	Roasso Kumamoto	1–1	Tokushima Vortis	Kumamoto
12:00				Stadium: Egao Kenko Stadium; Attendance: 4,166; Referee: Keisuke Nobori

8 April 2023 8	JEF United Chiba	1–1	Tokushima Vortis	Chiba
13:00				Stadium: Fukuda Denshi Arena; Attendance: 5,475; Referee: Yūzō Sudani

12 April 2023 9	Tokushima Vortis	0–2	Mito HollyHock	Naruto
19:03		Report	Toyama 59'; Takeda 69'	Stadium: Pocarisweat Stadium; Attendance: 3,304; Referee: Reo Tanaka

16 April 2023 10	Tokushima Vortis	0–4	V-Varen Nagasaki	Naruto
14:03		Report	Juanma 26'; Kushibiki 55', 88'; Miyagi 90'	Stadium: Pocarisweat Stadium; Attendance: 4,892; Referee: Kazuyoshi Enomoto

23 April 2023 11	Thespakusatsu Gunma	0–0	Tokushima Vortis	Maebashi
14:03		Report		Stadium: Shoda Shoyu Stadium Gunma; Attendance: 2,949; Referee: Hirokazu Otsubo

29 April 2023 12	Júbilo Iwata	2–3	Tokushima Vortis	Iwata
14:03	Matsubara 53'; Matsumoto 86'	Report	Mori 2'; Kakitani 20', 60'; Watari (yellow card) 85'	Stadium: Yamaha Stadium; Attendance: 9,280; Referee: Takuto Okabe

3 May 2023 13	Tokushima Vortis	1–1	Shimizu S-Pulse	Naruto
14:03	Abe 40'	Report	Suzuki 90+3'	Stadium: Pocarisweat Stadium; Attendance: 13,199; Referee: Yuzo Sutani

7 May 2023 14	Omiya Ardija	1–3	Tokushima Vortis	Saitama
14:03	Izumisawa 81'	Report	Kakitani 12'; Mori 21', 76'	Stadium: NACK5 Stadium Omiya; Attendance: 4,288; Referee: Toru Kakinuma

13 May 2023 15	Renofa Yamaguchi	2–2	Tokushima Vortis	Yamaguchi
13:15	Ikegami 61'; Renan 88'	Report	Mori 27'; Kakitani 40'	Stadium: Ishin Me-Life Stadium; Attendance: 3,775; Referee: Koji Takasaki

17 May 2023 16	Tokushima Vortis	v	Zweigen Kanazawa	Naruto
19:00		Report		Stadium: Pocarisweat Stadium

21 May 2023 17	Fujieda MYFC	v	Tokushima Vortis	Fujieda
14:00				Stadium: Fujieda Soccer Stadium

28 May 2023 18	Tokushima Vortis	v	Machida Zelvia	Naruto
14:00				Stadium: Pocarisweat Stadium

3 June 2023 19	Fagiano Okayama	v	Tokushima Vortis	Okayama
19:00				Stadium: City Light Stadium

11 June 2023 20	Tokushima Vortis	v	Tochigi SC	Naruto
16:00				Stadium: Pocarisweat Stadium

17 June 2023 21	Tokushima Vortis	v	Montedio Yamagata	Naruto
19:00				Stadium: Pocarisweat Stadium

25 June 2023 22	Vegalta Sendai	v	Tokushima Vortis	Sendai
18:00				Stadium: Yurtec Stadium Sendai

=== Emperor's Cup ===
7 June 2023 Second round	Tokushima Vortis	v	Iwaki FC	Naruto
19:00				Stadium: Pocarisweat Stadium
