= Guillem Barrés =

Spanish footballer

Personal information
- Full name: Guillem Barrés Ramos
- Date of birth: 4 December 2006 (age 19)
- Place of birth: Tarragona, Spain
- Position: Centre-back

Team information
- Current team: Pobla Mafumet
- Number: 12

Youth career
- 2019–2020: Puigcerdá
- 2021–2022: Atlètic Sant Just
- 2012–2023: Unificación Bellvitge
- 2023–2024: Sabadell
- 2024–2025: Gimnàstic

Senior career*
Years	Team	Apps	(Gls)
2025–	Pobla Mafumet	1	(0)
2025–2026	→ Olot (loan)	11	(0)
- * Club domestic league appearances and goals as of 5 September 2026

Guillem Barrés Ramos (born 4 December 2006) is a Spanish footballer who plays as a centre-back for CF Pobla de Mafumet.

== Career ==
Born in Tarragona, Catalonia, Barrés represented CF Puigcerdá, Atlètic Sant Just FC, UD Unificación Bellvitge, CE Sabadell FC and Gimnàstic de Tarragona as a youth. In July 2025, he was included in the pre-season of the latter's first team, but was loaned to Segunda Federación side UE Olot on 1 August.

Barrés made his senior debut on 26 October 2025, coming on as a half-time substitute for injured Oriol Ayala in a 2–1 home win over Girona FC B. He was mainly a backup to Ayala and Robert Costa during the campaign, featuring in 11 matches as the club avoided relegation.

Back to Nàstic in July 2026, Barrés was assigned to farm team CF Pobla de Mafumet in Tercera Federación.
