= Omar Falah =

Spanish footballer

Personal information
- Full name: Omar Falah Ruiz
- Date of birth: 9 September 2003 (age 23)
- Place of birth: Gijón, Spain
- Positions: Left-back; winger

Youth career
- Roces
- 2019–2021: Llano 2000
- 2021–2022: Burgos

Senior career*
| Years | Team | Apps | (Gls) |
| 2022–2023 | Langreo B | 5 | (1) |
| 2022–2023 | Langreo | 10 | (0) |
| 2023–2026 | Oviedo B | 68 | (1) |
| 2025–2026 | Oviedo | 2 | (0) |
- * Club domestic league appearances and goals as of 14 May 2026

Omar Falah Ruiz (born 9 September 2003) is a Spanish footballer. Mainly a left-back, he can also play as a left winger.

== Career ==
Born in Gijón, Asturias, Falah played for the youth sides of CD Roces, SD Llano 2000 and Burgos CF before joining UP Langreo on a two-year contract on 27 July 2022. He made his senior debut with the reserves on 11 September, starting in a 3–2 Regional Preferente home win over CD Vallobín.

On 17 January 2023, after featuring with the first team in Segunda Federación, Falah signed a two-and-a-half-year deal with Real Oviedo and was assigned to the B-team also in the fourth tier. He made his professional debut with the main squad on 1 June 2025, coming on as a late substitute for Santi Cazorla in a 2–1 Segunda División home win over Cádiz CF.
