= Oriol Subirats =

Spanish footballer

Personal information
- Full name: Oriol Subirats Navarro
- Date of birth: 3 June 2007 (age 19)
- Place of birth: Sant Jaume d'Enveja, Spain
- Position: Right-back

Team information
- Current team: Gimnàstic
- Number: 29

Youth career
- 2016–2026: Gimnàstic

Senior career*
Years	Team	Apps	(Gls)
2025–	Gimnàstic	6	(0)
- * Club domestic league appearances and goals as of 23 May 2026

Oriol Subirats Navarro (born 3 June 2007) is a Spanish footballer who plays as a right-back for Gimnàstic de Tarragona.

== Career ==
Born in Sant Jaume d'Enveja, Tarragona, Catalonia, Subirats joined Gimnàstic de Tarragona's youth sides in 2016, aged nine. On 29 July 2024, he signed a professional contract with the club, agreeing to a deal until 2026.

On 24 May 2025, before even having appeared with farm team, CF Pobla de Mafumet, Subirats made his first team debut by coming on as a late substitute for Víctor Narro in a 2–0 Primera Federación home win over CD Arenteiro. The following 5 February, after being mainly used in the Juvenil team, he further extended his link until 2028, with an option for a further two seasons, and was definitely promoted to the main squad.
