= Marco Alvarez =

Marco Alvarez may refer to:

- Marco Alvarez, character in 3%

== See also ==
- Marc Álvarez (born 2001), Spanish footballer
- Marcos Álvarez (born 1991), German footballer
- Marco Antonio Alvarez Ferreira (born 1964), Brazilian footballer
- Marcos Álvarez Pérez, Mexican politician
