= José Aurelio Suárez =

Spanish footballer

Personal information
- Full name: José Aurelio Suárez García
- Date of birth: 18 December 1995 (age 30)
- Place of birth: Gijón, Spain
- Height: 1.87 m (6 ft 1 1/2 in)
- Position: Goalkeeper

Team information
- Current team: JEF United Chiba
- Number: 19

Youth career
- 2009–2011: Roces
- 2011–2014: Barcelona

Senior career*
Years	Team	Apps	(Gls)
2014–2017	Barcelona B	48	(0)
2017–2019	Peralada	23	(0)
2019–2021	Girona	0	(0)
2021	Gimnàstic	15	(1)
2021–2022	Alcorcón	1	(0)
2022–2024	Tokushima Vortis	92	(0)
2025–	JEF United Chiba	36	(0)
- * Club domestic league appearances and goals as of 12 August 2026

José Aurelio Suárez García (born 18 December 1995) is a Spanish professional footballer who plays as a goalkeeper for J1 League club JEF United Chiba.

== Club career ==
Born in Gijón, Asturias, Suárez started playing football for hometown club CD Roces, moving to FC Barcelona's youth system, La Masia, in 2011. After progressing through its ranks, he was promoted to the B-team in 2014.

Suárez played his first match as a professional on 31 January 2015, in a 1–4 away win against CE Sabadell FC for the Segunda División championship. His performance was praised by the media.

On 7 July 2017, after being a regular starter in the B-side's promotion to the second level, free agent Suárez signed a four-year deal with La Liga side Girona FC. On 25 August, however, he suffered a shoulder injury which kept him out for four months.

On 18 January 2021, Suárez terminated his contract with Girona, and signed for third division side Gimnàstic de Tarragona just hours later. On 3 April, he scored a last-minute equalizer in a 2–2 home draw against Villarreal CF B.

On 12 July 2021, Suárez returned to the second division after agreeing to a two-year deal with AD Alcorcón. A backup to Dani Jiménez, he featured in three matches overall before being transferred to Japanese club Tokushima Vortis on 28 January 2022.

On 6 February 2025, Suárez was announced at J2 club JEF United Chiba for the 2025 season.

== Career statistics ==
=== Club ===
As of match played 5 April 2025.

Club	Season	League			National Cup		Other		Total	
Club	Season	Division	Apps	Goals	Apps	Goals	Apps	Goals	Apps	Goals
Barcelona B	2014–15	Segunda División	17	0	—		—		17	0
Barcelona B	2015–16	Segunda División B	1	0	—		—		1	0
Barcelona B	2016–17	Segunda División B	30	0	—		3 (Note: Appearances in Segunda División B play-offs)	0	33	0
Barcelona B	Total		48	0	0	0	3	0	51	0
Peralada	2018-19	Segunda División B	23	0	—		—		23	0
Peralada	Total		23	0	0	0	0	0	23	0
Girona	2020-21	Segunda División B	0	0	0	0	1 (Note: Appearance in Supercopa de Catalunya)	0	0	0
Girona	Total		0	0	0	0	1	0	0	0
Gimnàstic	2020–21	Segunda División B	9	0	0	0	0	0	9	0
Alcorcón	2021–22	Segunda División	1	0	2	0	0	0	3	0
Tokushima Vortis	2022	J2 League	34	0	0	0	1 (Note: Appearance in J.League Cup)	0	35	0
Tokushima Vortis	2023	J2 League	35	0	0	0	0	0	35	0
Tokushima Vortis	2024	J2 League	23	0	0	0	0	0	23	0
Tokushima Vortis	Total		82	0	0	0	1	0	83	0
JEF United Chiba	2025	J2 League	5	0	0	0	0	0	5	0
JEF United Chiba	Total		5	0	0	0	0	0	5	0
Career total			178	0	2	0	4	0	184	0

== Honours ==
Barcelona

- UEFA Youth League: 2013–14
