= Adolfo Baines =

Spanish footballer

Personal information
- Full name: Adolfo Baines Pilart
- Date of birth: 15 February 1972 (age 54)
- Place of birth: Isaba, Spain
- Height: 1.88 m (6 ft 2 in)
- Position: Goalkeeper

Youth career
- Osasuna

Senior career*
Years	Team	Apps	(Gls)
1991–1992	Osasuna B	0	(0)
1992–1995	Huesca	108	(0)
1995–1997	Logroñés	0	(0)
1997–1998	Getafe	18	(0)
1998–2000	Gimnàstic	54	(0)
2000–2003	Badajoz	99	(0)
2003	Leixões	0	(0)
2004–2006	Tenerife	4	(0)
2006–2007	Milton Keynes Dons	19	(0)
Total		302	(0)

Managerial career
- 2018–2020: Inter d'Escaldes
- 2021–2024: Pobla Mafumet
- * Club domestic league appearances and goals

Adolfo Baines Pilart (born 15 February 1972) is a Spanish former professional footballer who played as a goalkeeper, and a current manager.

== Club career ==
Born in Isaba, Navarre, Baines was in CD Logroñés' roster from 1995 to 1997, being part of the team that competed in La Liga in the latter season but appearing in no league games. He started his active professional career in the third division, with Getafe CF and Gimnàstic de Tarragona. In 2000 he moved to CD Badajoz in the second level, being a starter throughout his entire spell and not being able to prevent relegation in his last campaign.

In January 2004, after an unassuming stint in the lower leagues of Portugal, Baines returned to his country and signed with another second-tier side, agreeing to a two-and-a-half-year contract with CD Tenerife. He only managed to be a backup during his tenure in the Canary Islands, totalling just five matches.

Subsequently, Baines joined Milton Keynes Dons of the English Fourth Division on a free transfer. He had a stormy start to the season as he was sent off in his first league game after handling the ball outside the area in a 2–1 win against Bury; he was soon dropped to the bench when Lee Harper was brought on loan from Northampton Town.

After having spent the majority of his spell on the club's transfer list, Baines was released by Milton Keynes in May 2007. In 2011, he returned to his former team Gimnàstic as a goalkeeper coach.

== Managerial statistics ==
As of 12 February 2023

Managerial record by team and tenure
Team	Nat	From	To	Record								Ref
Team	Nat	From	To	G	W	D	L	GF	GA	GD	Win %	Ref
IC d'Escaldes	(Andorra)	20 August 2018	22 September 2020	57	33	13	11	87	47	+40	57.89	
Pobla Mafumet	(Spain)	14 July 2021	Present	53	21	11	21	61	50	+11	39.62	
Total				110	54	24	32	148	97	+51	49.09	—
