= 2023 Tochigi SC season =

Tochigi SC
2023 season
- Stadium: Kanseki Stadium Tochigi
- J2 League: 10th
- Emperor's Cup: Second round
- All statistics correct as of May 2023.

The 2023 season was Tochigi SC's 53rd season in existence and the club's sixth consecutive season in the second division of Japanese football. In addition to the domestic league, Tochigi SC participated in this season's edition of the Emperor's Cup.

== Transfers ==
=== In ===
Pos.	Player	Transferred from	Fee	Date	Source
GK	(Japan)	(Japan)			
GK	(Japan)	(Japan)			

=== Out ===
Pos.	Player	Transferred to	Fee	Date	Source
GK	(Japan)	(Japan)			
GK	(Japan)	(Japan)			

== Pre-season and friendlies ==
Win Draw Loss Fixtures

2023 Friendly	Tochigi SC (Japan)	v	(Japan)	TBD
17:00

== Competitions ==
=== Overview ===
Competition	First match	Last match	Starting round	Record							
Competition	First match	Last match	Starting round	Pld	W	D	L	GF	GA	GD	Win %
J2 League	February 2023	12 November 2023	Matchday 1	19	5	5	9	18	22	−4	26.32
Emperor's Cup	7 June 2023		Second round	1	1	0	0	2	1	+1	100.00
Total				20	6	5	9	20	23	−3	30.00

Last updated: 11 June 2023
Source: Soccerway

=== J2 League ===
==== League table ====
Pos	Team	Pld	W	D	L	GF	GA	GD	Pts	Promotion or relegation
17	Mito HollyHock	42	11	14	17	49	66	−17	47	
18	Iwaki FC	42	12	11	19	45	69	−24	47	
19	Tochigi SC	42	10	14	18	39	47	−8	44	
20	Renofa Yamaguchi	42	10	14	18	37	67	−30	44	
21	Omiya Ardija (R)	42	11	6	25	37	71	−34	39	Relegation to J3 League

Source: Meiji Yasuda J2 League, J.League Data Site
Rules for classification: 1) Points; 2) Goal difference; 3) Goals scored; 4) Head-to-head points; 5) Head-to-head goal difference; 6) Head-to-head goal scored; 7) Fair-play points.
(R) Relegated

==== Results summary ====
Overall								Home						Away					
Pld	W	D	L	GF	GA	GD	Pts	W	D	L	GF	GA	GD	W	D	L	GF	GA	GD
20	5	5	10	18	23	−5	20	5	2	2	13	8	+5	0	3	8	5	15	−10

Last updated: 11 June 2023.
Source: Worldfootball

==== Results by round ====
Round	1	2	3	4	5	6	7	8	9	10	11	12	13	14	15	16	17	18	19	20
Ground	H	A	A	H	H	A	H	A	H	A	H	A	H	A	A	H	A	H	A	A
Result	D	L	L	D	W	L	L	D	W	L	W	L	W	L	D	L	L	W	D	L
Position																				

Updated to match(es) played on 11 June 2023. Source: Worldfootball
A = Away; H = Home; W = Win; D = Draw; L = Loss

==== Matches ====
The league fixtures were announced on 20 January 2023.

February 2023	Tochigi SC	v
JST (UTC+9)

3 June 2023 19	Fujieda MYFC	1–1	Tochigi SC	Fujieda
18:00				Stadium: Fujieda Soccer Stadium; Referee: Takafumi Mikuriya

11 June 2023 20	Tokushima Vortis	1–0	Tochigi SC	Naruto
16:00	Mori 25'			Stadium: Pocarisweat Stadium

=== Emperor's Cup ===
7 June 2023 Second round	Blaublitz Akita	1–2	Tochigi SC	Akita
19:00 JST (UTC+9)		Report		Stadium: Soyu Stadium
