= Xavi Vilagut =

Spanish football manager

Personal information
- Full name: Xavier Vilagut Castañer
- Date of birth: 1982 (age 43–44)
- Place of birth: Vilanova i la Geltrú, Spain

Team information
- Current team: Pobla Mafumet (manager)

Youth career
- Blanca Subur

Senior career*
Years	Team	Apps	(Gls)
- Sitges
- Vendrell
- Suburense
- Ribes
- Vilanova B

Managerial career
- Escola Montserrat (youth)
- 2005–2015: Vilanova (youth)
- 2015–2016: Atlètic Vilafranca (youth)
- 2016–2022: Cubelles
- 2022–2024: Vilanova
- 2024–2025: Gimnàstic (youth)
- 2025–: Pobla Mafumet
- * Club domestic league appearances and goals

Xavier "Xavi" Vilagut Castañer (born 1982) is a Spanish football manager and former player. He is the current manager of CF Pobla de Mafumet.

== Career ==
Born in Vilanova i la Geltrú, Barcelona, Catalonia, Vilagut was a CF Blanca Subur youth graduate. He represented UE Sitges, CE Vendrell, CF Suburense, Club Atlètic Ribes and CF Vilanova's reserve side as a senior before retiring and focusing solely on managing.

After working at Escola Montserrat, Vilanova and FE Atlètic Vilafranca's youth sides, Vilagut was appointed manager of Tercera Catalana side CF Cubelles in 2016. He led the club to a promotion to Segona Catalana in 2019, before departing the club on 2 June 2022.

On 1 August 2022, Vilagut returned to Vilanova, being named first team manager in Primera Catalana. He renewed his contract for a further year on 23 June 2023, and despite leading the club to a promotion to Lliga Elit at the end of the season, he was let go on 22 May 2024.

On 23 July 2024, Vilagut joined Gimnàstic de Tarragona after being appointed manager of the Juvenil A squad. The following 30 June, after a good overall performance in the División de Honor Juvenil, he was named in charge of farm team CF Pobla de Mafumet in the sixth division.

In June 2026, after leading Pobla to a promotion to Tercera Federación, Vilagut's contract was extended for a further campaign.
