= 2017–18 Segunda División =

87th season of the second-tier football league in Spain

Segunda División
- Season: 2017–18
- Dates: 18 August 2017 – 2 June 2018 (regular season)
- Champions: Rayo Vallecano
- Promoted: Rayo Vallecano; Huesca; Valladolid
- Relegated: Cultural Leonesa; Barcelona B Lorca FC; Sevilla Atlético
- Matches: 468
- Goals: 1,083 (2.31 per match)
- Top goalscorer: Jaime Mata (33 goals)
- Biggest home win: Córdoba 5–0 Reus (20 December 2017)
- Biggest away win: Gimnàstic 0–4 Sporting Gijón (2 September 2017); Córdoba 1–5 Gimnàstic (15 October 2017); Lorca FC 1–5 Valladolid (19 May 2018)
- Highest scoring: Cultural Leonesa 4–4 Valladolid (10 September 2017); Gimnàstic 5–3 Cultural Leonesa (19 May 2018)
- Longest winning run: Sporting Gijón (8 matches)
- Longest unbeaten run: Osasuna; Sporting Gijón (12 matches)
- Longest winless run: Lorca FC (16 matches)
- Longest losing run: Lorca FC (10 matches)
- Highest attendance: 29,741; Zaragoza 1–2 Numancia (9 June 2018)
- Lowest attendance: 409; Sevilla Atlético 1–2 Albacete (16 March 2018)
- Attendance: 4,104,401 (8,770 per match)

The 2017–18 Segunda División season, also known as LaLiga 1|2|3 for sponsorship reasons, was the 87th season of the Spanish football second division since its establishment.

== Name ==
Previously named Liga Adelante, the competition was renamed LaLiga 1|2|3 ahead of the 2016–17 season, as a result of a three-year sponsorship agreement between the Liga de Fútbol Profesional and the banking group Banco Santander.

== Team changes ==
=== To Segunda División ===
Promoted from 2016–17 Segunda División B

- Albacete
- Barcelona B
- Cultural Leonesa
- Lorca FC

Relegated from 2016–17 La Liga

- Granada
- Osasuna
- Sporting Gijón

=== From Segunda División ===
Relegated to 2017–18 Segunda División B

- Elche
- Mallorca
- Mirandés
- UCAM Murcia

Promoted to 2017–18 La Liga

- Getafe
- Girona
- Levante

== Stadiums and locations ==
Location of teams in 2017–18 Segunda División
Location of teams in 2017–18 Segunda División (Canary Islands)

Team	Location	Stadium	Capacity
Albacete	Albacete	Carlos Belmonte	17,300
Alcorcón	Alcorcón	Santo Domingo	5,100
Almería	Almería	Juegos Mediterráneos	15,000
Barcelona B	Barcelona	Mini Estadi	15,276
Cádiz	Cádiz	Ramón de Carranza	25,033
Córdoba	Córdoba	El Arcángel	20,989
Cultural Leonesa	León	Reino de León	13,346
Gimnàstic	Tarragona	Nou Estadi	14,591
Granada	Granada	Nuevo Los Cármenes	22,094
Huesca	Huesca	El Alcoraz	5,500
Lorca FC	Lorca	Francisco Artés Carrasco	8,120
Lugo	Lugo	Anxo Carro	7,840
Numancia	Soria	Los Pajaritos	8,727
Osasuna	Pamplona	El Sadar	18,761
Oviedo	Oviedo	Carlos Tartiere	30,500
Rayo Vallecano	Madrid	Vallecas	14,505
Reus	Reus	Municipal	4,300
Sevilla Atlético	Seville	Viejo Nervión	8,000
Sporting Gijón	Gijón	El Molinón	29,029
Tenerife	Santa Cruz de Tenerife	Heliodoro Rodríguez López	22,824
Valladolid	Valladolid	José Zorrilla	26,512
Zaragoza	Zaragoza	La Romareda	34,596

=== Personnel and sponsorship ===
Team	Head coach	Captain	Kit manufacturer	Main shirt sponsor
Albacete	(Spain) Enrique Martín	(Spain) Carlos Delgado	Hummel	Soliss Seguros
Alcorcón	(Spain) Julio Velázquez	(Spain) Carlos Bellvís	Kelme	Wanabet
Almería	(Spain) Fran Fernández	(Spain) Jorge Morcillo	Nike	Urcisol
Barcelona B	(Spain) Xavi García Pimienta	(Spain) Sergi Palencia	Nike	Rakuten
Cádiz	(Spain) Álvaro Cervera	(Spain) Servando Sánchez	Adidas	Torrot
Córdoba	(Spain) José Ramón Sandoval	(Spain) Alejandro Alfaro	Kappa	Tango Fruit
Cultural Leonesa	(Spain) Rubén de la Barrera	(Spain) Antonio Martínez	Hummel	Aspire Academy
Gimnàstic	(Spain) José Antonio Gordillo	(Spain) Xavi Molina	Hummel	Sorigué
Granada	(Spain) Miguel Ángel Portugal	(Spain) Raúl Baena	Joma	Energy King
Huesca	(Spain) Rubi	(Spain) Juanjo Camacho	Bemiser	Simply Supermercados
Lorca FC	(Spain) Fabri	(Spain) Juan Pedro Pina	Hummel	
Lugo	(Spain) Francisco	(Spain) Carlos Pita	Hummel	Estrella Galicia
Numancia	(Spain) Jagoba Arrasate	(Venezuela) Julio Álvarez	Erreà	Jawwy
Osasuna	(Spain) Diego Martínez	(Spain) Miguel Flaño	Adidas	
Oviedo	(Spain) Juan Antonio Anquela	(Spain) Toché	Adidas	Huawei
Rayo Vallecano	(Spain) Míchel	(Spain) Adri Embarba	Kelme	Bufete Rosales
Reus	(Spain) Aritz López Garai	(Spain) Jesús Olmo	Kappa	
Sevilla Atlético	(Spain) Luis García Tevenet	(Spain) Curro	New Balance	Playtika
Sporting Gijón	(Spain) Rubén Baraja	(Spain) Roberto Canella	Nike	Teslacard, Gijón, Telecable, Nissan
Tenerife	(Spain) Joseba Etxeberria	(Spain) Suso Santana	Hummel	Santa Cruz
Valladolid	(Spain) Sergio González	(Spain) Javi Moyano	Hummel	Cuatro Rayas
Zaragoza	(Spain) Natxo González	(Spain) Alberto Zapater	Adidas	Caravan Fragancias

=== Managerial changes ===
Team	Outgoing manager	Manner of departure	Date of vacancy	Position in table	Replaced by	Date of appointment
Granada	(England) Tony Adams	End of interim spell	19 May 2017	Pre-season	(Spain) José Luis Oltra	3 June 2017
Lorca FC	(Spain) David Vidal	End of contract	30 June 2017	Pre-season	(Spain) Curro Torres	2 July 2017
Sevilla Atlético	(Spain) Diego Martínez	Signed for Osasuna	7 June 2017	Pre-season	(Spain) Luis García Tevenet	8 June 2017
Osasuna	(Serbia) Petar Vasiljević	Sacked	7 June 2017	Pre-season	(Spain) Diego Martínez	7 June 2017
Sporting Gijón	(Spain) Rubi	End of contract	10 June 2017	Pre-season	(Spain) Paco Herrera	15 June 2017
Zaragoza	(Spain) César Láinez	End of interim spell	11 June 2017	Pre-season	(Spain) Natxo González	11 June 2017
Reus	(Spain) Natxo González	Signed for Zaragoza	11 June 2017	Pre-season	(Spain) Aritz López Garai	15 June 2017
Valladolid	(Spain) Paco Herrera	End of contract	12 June 2017	Pre-season	(Spain) Luis César Sampedro	23 June 2017
Oviedo	(Spain) Fernando Hierro	Mutual consent	13 June 2017	Pre-season	(Spain) Juan Antonio Anquela	23 June 2017
Lugo	(Spain) Luis César Sampedro	Resigned	15 June 2017	Pre-season	(Spain) Francisco	21 June 2017
Huesca	(Spain) Juan Antonio Anquela	End of contract	20 June 2017	Pre-season	(Spain) Rubi	23 June 2017
Gimnàstic	(Spain) Nano Rivas	End of interim spell	22 June 2017	Pre-season	(Spain) Lluís Carreras	22 June 2017
Gimnàstic	(Spain) Lluís Carreras	Sacked	9 September 2017	22nd	(Spain) Rodri	9 September 2017
Albacete	(Spain) José Manuel Aira	Sacked	1 October 2017	21st	(Spain) Enrique Martín	5 October 2017
Córdoba	(Spain) Luis Carrión	Sacked	16 October 2017	19th	(Spain) Juan Merino	18 October 2017
Almería	(Spain) Luis Miguel Ramis	Sacked	13 November 2017	20th	(Spain) Lucas Alcaraz	16 November 2017
Córdoba	(Spain) Juan Merino	Sacked	4 December 2017	22nd	(Spain) Jorge Romero	4 December 2017
Sporting Gijón	(Spain) Paco Herrera	Sacked	12 December 2017	10th	(Spain) Rubén Baraja	12 December 2017
Lorca FC	(Spain) Curro Torres	Sacked	17 December 2017	20th	(Spain) Fabri	22 December 2017
Gimnàstic	(Spain) Rodri	Sacked	29 January 2018	17th	(Spain) Nano Rivas	29 January 2018
Tenerife	(Spain) José Luis Martí	Sacked	4 February 2018	13th	(Spain) Joseba Etxeberria	5 February 2018
Córdoba	(Spain) Jorge Romero	Sacked	12 February 2018	20th	(Spain) José Ramón Sandoval	13 February 2018
Granada	(Spain) José Luis Oltra	Sacked	19 March 2018	5th	(Spain) Pedro Morilla	19 March 2018
Valladolid	(Spain) Luis César Sampedro	Sacked	10 April 2018	11th	(Spain) Sergio González	10 April 2018
Almería	(Spain) Lucas Alcaraz	Mutual agreement	24 April 2018	18th	(Spain) Fran Fernández	24 April 2018
Barcelona B	(Spain) Gerard López	Sacked	25 April 2018	20th	(Spain) Xavi García Pimienta	25 April 2018
Granada	(Spain) Pedro Morilla	Sacked	30 April 2018	8th	(Spain) Miguel Ángel Portugal	1 May 2018
Gimnàstic	(Spain) Nano Rivas	Sacked	13 May 2018	18th	(Spain) José Antonio Gordillo	14 May 2018

== League table ==
=== Standings ===
Pos	Team	Pld	W	D	L	GF	GA	GD	Pts	Promotion, qualification or relegation
1	Rayo Vallecano (C, P)	42	21	13	8	67	48	+19	76	Promotion to La Liga
2	Huesca (P)	42	21	12	9	61	40	+21	75	Promotion to La Liga
3	Zaragoza	42	20	11	11	57	44	+13	71 (Note: Zaragoza finished ahead of Sporting Gijón on head-to-head points: Sporting Gijón 0–1 Zaragoza, Zaragoza 2–1 Sporting Gijón)	Qualification for promotion play-offs
4	Sporting Gijón	42	21	8	13	60	40	+20	71	Qualification for promotion play-offs
5	Valladolid (O, P)	42	19	10	13	69	55	+14	67	Qualification for promotion play-offs
6	Numancia	42	18	11	13	52	41	+11	65 (Note: Numancia finished ahead of Oviedo on head-to-head goal difference: Oviedo 3–1 Numancia, Numancia 3–0 Oviedo)	Qualification for promotion play-offs
7	Oviedo	42	18	11	13	54	48	+6	65	
8	Osasuna	42	16	16	10	44	34	+10	64 (Note: Osasuna finished ahead of Cádiz on head-to-head points: Cádiz 0–2 Osasuna, Osasuna 1–0 Cádiz)	
9	Cádiz	42	16	16	10	42	29	+13	64	
10	Granada	42	17	10	15	55	50	+5	61	
11	Tenerife	42	15	14	13	58	50	+8	59	
12	Lugo	42	15	10	17	39	48	−9	55	
13	Alcorcón	42	12	16	14	37	42	−5	52 (Note: Alcorcón finished ahead of Reus and Gimnàstic on head-to-head points: Alcorcón 10 pts, Reus 5 pts, Gimnàstic 1 pt)	
14	Reus	42	12	16	14	31	42	−11	52	
15	Gimnàstic	42	15	7	20	44	50	−6	52	
16	Córdoba	42	15	6	21	57	65	−8	51	
17	Albacete	42	11	16	15	35	46	−11	49	
18	Almería	42	12	12	18	38	45	−7	48 (Note: Almería finished ahead of Cultural Leonesa on head-to head points: Cultural Leonesa 0–0 Almería, Almería 2–1 Cultural Leonesa)	
19	Cultural Leonesa (R)	42	11	15	16	54	67	−13	48	Relegation to Segunda División B
20	Barcelona B (R)	42	10	14	18	46	54	−8	44	Relegation to Segunda División B
21	Lorca FC (Note: Lorca were administratively relegated to the Tercera División due to financial difficulties.) (R)	42	8	9	25	37	68	−31	33	Demotion to Tercera División
22	Sevilla Atlético (R)	42	7	11	24	29	60	−31	32	Relegation to Segunda División B

Source: La Liga
Rules for classification: 1) points; 2) head-to-head points; 3) head-to-head goal difference; 4) goal difference; 5) number of goals scored
(C) Champions; (O) Play-off winners; (P) Promoted; (R) Relegated

=== Positions by round ===
The table lists the positions of teams after each week of matches. In order to preserve chronological evolvements, any postponed matches are not included to the round at which they were originally scheduled, but added to the full round they were played immediately afterwards. For example, if a match is scheduled for matchday 13, but then postponed and played between days 16 and 17, it will be added to the standings for day 16.

Team \ Round	1	2	3	4	5	6	7	8	9	10	11	12	13	14	15	16	17	18	19	20	21	22	23	24	25	26	27	28	29	30	31	32	33	34	35	36	37	38	39	40	41	42
Rayo	2	3	7	13	14	10	14	9	7	5	6	6	7	8	6	6	4	6	4	4	5	4	7	4	4	3	2	2	2	2	1	2	2	2	2	1	1	1	1	2	1	1
Huesca	19	8	10	12	16	14	6	3	6	7	5	5	2	1	1	1	1	1	1	1	1	1	1	1	1	1	1	1	1	1	2	1	3	3	3	3	3	2	2	1	2	2
Zaragoza	21	20	11	17	19	18	18	16	10	10	11	11	15	13	14	14	13	13	13	15	16	14	16	13	12	11	11	11	11	7	6	8	6	5	7	6	6	4	5	4	4	3
Sporting	15	2	1	2	8	1	7	4	2	3	3	3	4	5	8	8	9	10	8	10	9	9	10	9	10	9	10	7	5	4	4	3	1	1	1	2	2	3	3	3	3	4
Valladolid	18	9	4	4	2	6	2	7	4	6	7	7	8	9	7	9	11	12	10	9	10	10	9	10	9	10	8	9	10	10	10	9	7	11	11	9	9	8	7	5	6	5
Numancia	6	4	2	8	1	2	1	2	3	4	8	8	6	3	4	7	5	4	6	5	4	5	8	7	5	7	6	6	8	9	8	10	8	6	4	5	4	5	6	7	8	6
Oviedo	16	16	9	10	7	12	13	14	14	16	12	15	11	10	11	10	7	7	5	3	3	3	3	3	3	4	5	5	6	8	7	7	10	8	6	7	7	7	9	8	9	7
Osasuna	8	17	17	11	6	9	4	1	1	1	1	4	5	2	3	5	8	9	9	8	8	7	5	6	8	6	7	8	7	6	9	6	9	10	10	10	10	9	8	9	7	8
Cádiz	3	6	3	1	3	3	8	13	12	11	15	16	12	11	9	4	3	3	2	2	2	2	2	2	2	2	3	4	4	3	3	4	4	4	5	4	5	6	4	6	5	9
Granada	12	13	16	15	18	15	11	6	9	8	4	2	1	4	5	3	6	5	7	6	6	8	6	8	7	5	4	3	3	5	5	5	5	7	8	8	8	10	10	10	10	10
Tenerife	7	1	5	6	10	4	10	5	8	9	9	9	10	7	10	11	12	8	11	11	11	11	11	12	13	12	12	12	12	12	12	12	11	9	9	11	11	11	11	11	11	11
Lugo	13	21	20	18	12	7	3	8	5	2	2	1	3	6	2	2	2	2	3	7	7	6	4	5	6	8	9	10	9	11	11	11	12	12	12	12	12	12	12	12	12	12
Alcorcón	11	15	8	3	5	11	15	18	18	20	17	13	17	17	13	13	14	14	16	12	12	17	12	16	16	14	14	16	17	18	18	15	15	16	15	15	17	16	17	14	14	13
Reus	14	14	18	14	15	16	12	12	11	15	10	10	9	12	12	12	10	11	12	14	13	18	13	14	17	13	13	13	15	14	14	14	14	15	14	13	13	13	13	13	13	14
Gimnàstic	20	19	22	22	20	20	20	21	20	17	18	19	16	18	15	15	17	15	18	18	17	12	14	17	18	15	18	18	18	17	17	18	16	14	16	16	15	18	18	17	15	15
Córdoba	17	7	15	19	13	17	19	17	17	19	21	20	21	22	22	22	22	22	22	20	20	21	20	20	20	20	20	20	20	20	20	20	20	20	20	19	19	19	19	19	16	16
Albacete	10	22	21	21	22	21	21	20	21	18	19	18	18	16	17	17	18	16	17	13	15	13	15	11	11	16	17	15	13	13	13	13	13	13	13	14	14	14	14	15	18	17
Almería	5	5	12	7	11	5	5	11	15	14	16	17	20	20	19	20	15	18	14	16	14	15	17	19	15	18	16	14	14	15	16	17	18	17	17	18	18	17	15	16	19	18
Cultural	22	11	6	9	4	8	9	10	13	12	13	12	14	15	16	16	16	19	15	17	18	16	18	15	19	19	19	19	19	19	19	19	19	19	18	17	16	15	16	18	17	19
Barcelona B	4	12	14	5	9	13	16	15	16	13	14	14	13	14	18	18	19	17	19	19	19	19	19	18	14	17	15	17	16	16	15	16	17	18	19	20	20	20	20	20	20	20
Lorca FC	1	10	13	16	17	19	17	19	19	21	20	21	19	19	20	19	20	20	20	21	21	20	21	22	22	22	21	21	21	21	21	21	21	21	21	21	21	21	21	21	22	21
Sevilla At.	9	18	19	20	21	22	22	22	22	22	22	22	22	21	21	21	21	21	21	22	22	22	22	21	21	21	22	22	22	22	22	22	22	22	22	22	22	22	22	22	21	22

Source: BDFútbol

== Results ==
Home \ Away	ALB	ALC	ALM	BAR	CAD	COR	CUL	GIM	GRA	HUE	LOR	LUG	NUM	OSA	OVI	RAY	REU	SAT	SPO	TFE	VAD	ZAR
Albacete	—	2–0	2–0	0–0	1–1	0–3	0–0	0–1	2–1	0–0	2–1	0–1	1–0	0–0	2–1	0–1	0–1	2–1	2–2	1–2	2–1	0–0
Alcorcón	1–0	—	2–0	1–1	1–0	1–2	0–0	1–0	1–2	1–1	1–1	0–1	0–1	0–0	2–0	4–0	3–0	0–0	0–0	1–1	0–0	1–1
Almería	1–1	0–0	—	1–0	0–2	1–0	2–1	1–1	2–0	0–3	2–1	1–0	0–0	0–1	1–1	0–1	0–1	3–0	1–3	2–1	1–1	3–0
Barcelona B	0–1	0–1	1–1	—	3–1	4–0	0–1	1–1	3–0	0–2	1–0	1–2	2–2	0–2	1–1	2–3	0–1	1–1	2–1	0–3	0–1	0–2
Cádiz	2–0	0–0	0–0	3–1	—	2–0	2–2	2–0	1–0	1–1	0–0	1–1	0–0	0–2	2–1	0–0	1–0	4–1	0–0	1–1	1–0	2–0
Córdoba	1–0	3–0	2–0	1–2	1–2	—	2–2	1–5	1–2	2–4	1–0	1–0	1–1	0–1	1–1	2–2	5–0	3–0	3–0	2–0	2–1	1–2
Cultural Leonesa	0–0	2–2	0–0	1–1	0–1	2–1	—	2–0	1–1	3–2	2–1	1–1	2–2	2–1	2–0	2–3	2–0	2–1	0–2	3–2	4–4	0–1
Gimnàstic	3–1	0–3	0–1	0–0	0–0	0–2	5–3	—	2–0	1–2	0–2	3–0	0–0	0–2	1–2	2–0	1–2	2–1	0–4	1–2	1–0	0–2
Granada	0–0	2–0	3–2	2–2	2–1	3–1	3–3	0–1	—	2–0	4–1	2–0	1–0	1–1	2–0	0–2	1–0	1–2	2–1	2–1	1–0	2–1
Huesca	0–0	1–1	2–2	2–1	1–0	3–1	1–0	0–1	2–1	—	2–0	3–0	2–1	1–0	1–1	2–1	1–1	0–0	0–2	3–0	1–0	3–1
Lorca FC	1–2	1–1	1–2	1–1	3–0	1–0	2–0	1–0	3–2	2–3	—	1–2	2–1	0–1	0–2	0–0	1–1	2–1	0–0	2–2	1–5	0–2
Lugo	1–1	2–1	1–1	1–2	0–1	2–0	3–1	1–0	2–1	0–2	1–1	—	0–1	1–0	0–1	1–2	0–0	1–0	3–1	1–0	0–0	2–1
Numancia	5–1	1–0	1–0	1–0	1–0	2–1	2–1	1–2	1–3	1–0	1–0	2–0	—	1–1	3–0	0–0	1–0	3–0	3–0	2–0	0–1	1–2
Osasuna	1–0	2–3	2–1	2–2	1–0	1–1	2–1	0–2	0–0	1–1	1–0	1–1	2–2	—	2–1	1–1	0–0	1–1	2–0	0–1	4–2	1–2
Oviedo	0–0	0–1	2–1	0–0	1–0	2–0	3–0	1–0	2–1	2–1	2–0	3–2	3–1	1–0	—	2–3	3–0	2–1	2–1	1–1	1–2	2–2
Rayo Vallecano	1–1	2–1	1–0	1–0	1–1	1–2	3–1	2–3	1–0	3–0	5–1	1–0	2–2	0–3	2–2	—	3–2	2–0	1–1	3–1	4–1	2–1
Reus	1–1	1–1	1–0	2–1	1–0	1–2	1–1	1–1	0–0	0–0	3–0	0–1	1–0	0–0	0–0	0–2	—	2–0	1–0	1–1	2–2	1–1
Sevilla Atlético	1–2	1–0	0–3	3–1	0–0	1–1	1–2	1–0	0–0	0–1	3–2	1–1	2–1	0–1	0–1	0–0	0–1	—	0–1	1–1	1–2	2–2
Sporting Gijón	2–1	3–0	2–0	2–3	0–3	3–2	4–0	2–0	2–1	1–1	1–0	2–0	2–0	2–0	1–1	1–0	2–1	3–0	—	3–0	1–1	0–1
Tenerife	1–1	4–0	0–0	1–3	1–1	5–1	2–0	2–0	2–2	2–4	2–0	3–1	1–1	0–0	3–1	2–2	3–0	2–0	1–0	—	0–0	1–0
Valladolid	3–2	4–0	2–1	1–2	1–1	4–1	3–2	0–3	2–1	3–2	3–0	2–2	2–3	2–0	3–1	1–1	1–0	1–0	0–1	2–0	—	3–2
Zaragoza	4–1	0–1	2–1	1–1	0–2	1–0	0–0	1–1	1–1	1–0	3–1	2–0	3–0	1–1	2–1	3–2	0–0	0–1	2–1	1–0	3–2	—

Source: BDFútbol
Legend: Blue = home team win; Yellow = draw; Red = away team win.

== Promotion play-offs ==
Teams placed between 3rd and 6th position (excluding reserve teams) took part in the promotion play-offs.

Semi-finals
Numancia	1	2	3
Zaragoza	1	1	2
Valladolid	3	2	5
Sporting Gijón	1	1	2

Final
Numancia	0	1	1
Valladolid	3	1	4

== Season statistics ==
=== Top goalscorers ===
Rank	Player	Club	Goals
1	(Spain) Jaime Mata	Valladolid	33
2	(Spain) Raúl de Tomás	Rayo Vallecano	24
3	(Spain) Sergi Guardiola	Córdoba	22
3	(Spain) Borja Iglesias	Zaragoza	22
5	(Uruguay) Michael Santos	Sporting Gijón	17
6	(Colombia) Cucho Hernández	Huesca	16
6	(Spain) Gonzalo Melero	Huesca	16
8	(Venezuela) Darwin Machís	Granada	14
9	(Italy) Samuele Longo	Tenerife	12
9	(Argentina) Óscar Trejo	Rayo Vallecano	12

=== Top assists ===
Rank	Player	Club	Assists
1	(Spain) Adri Embarba	Rayo Vallecano	14
2	(Spain) Saúl Berjón	Oviedo	13
2	(Argentina) Emi Buendía	Cultural Leonesa	13
4	(Spain) David Ferreiro	Huesca	11
5	(Spain) Carlos Carmona	Sporting Gijón	10
6	(Spain) José Ángel Pozo	Almería	8
6	(Spain) Rubén García	Sporting Gijón	8
6	(Spain) Sergi Guardiola	Córdoba	8
6	(Spain) Marc Mateu	Numancia	8
6	(Spain) Óscar Plano	Valladolid	8

=== Zamora Trophy ===
The Zamora Trophy was awarded by newspaper Marca to the goalkeeper with the least goals-to-games ratio. Keepers had to play at least 28 games of 60 or more minutes to be eligible for the trophy.

Rank	Player	Club	Goals Against	Matches	Average
1	(Spain) Alberto Cifuentes	Cádiz	29	42	0.69
2	(Spain) Sergio Herrera	Osasuna	29	40	0.73
3	(Spain) Álex Remiro	Huesca	38	40	0.95
4	(Spain) Casto	Alcorcón	38	39	0.97
5	(Spain) Diego Mariño	Sporting Gijón	42	43	0.98

=== Hat-tricks ===
Player	For	Against	Result	Date	Round	Reference
(Venezuela) Darwin Machís	Granada	Lorca FC	4–1 (H)	30 October 2017	12	
(Spain) Sergi Guardiola	Córdoba	Reus	5–0 (H)	20 December 2017	20	
(Spain) Carles Pérez	Barcelona B	Tenerife	3–1 (A)	21 January 2018	23	
(Spain) Raúl de Tomás	Rayo Vallecano	Lorca FC	5–1 (H)	27 January 2018	24	
(Spain) Raúl de Tomás	Rayo Vallecano	Cultural Leonesa	3–2 (A)	18 February 2018	27	
(Spain) Raúl de Tomás	Rayo Vallecano	Reus	3–2 (H)	18 March 2018	31	
(Spain) Jaime Mata	Valladolid	Lorca FC	5–1 (A)	19 May 2018	40	
(Georgia (country)) Giorgi Papunashvili	Zaragoza	Albacete	4–1 (H)	20 May 2018	40	
(Spain) Borja Iglesias	Zaragoza	Valladolid	3–2 (H)	27 May 2018	41	

(H) – Home; (A) – Away

== Average attendances ==
Attendances include play-off games.

Pos	Team	Total	High	Low	Average	Change
1	Sporting Gijón	458,392	27,506	15,436	20,836	−7.6%^{1}
2	Zaragoza	421,606	29,741	10,177	19,164	+21.6%
3	Oviedo	294,062	25,996	10,312	14,003	+3.4%
4	Osasuna	290,626	16,292	9,836	13,839	−6.6%^{1}
5	Cádiz	276,303	16,705	8,758	13,157	−4.7%
6	Córdoba	273,745	20,341	4,814	13,035	+6.1%
7	Tenerife	253,073	19,125	7,937	12,051	−2.7%
8	Valladolid	268,836	24,677	5,570	11,689	+42.5%
9	Granada	227,937	14,106	6,092	10,854	−27.6%^{1}
10	Rayo Vallecano	197,237	13,724	6,285	9,392	+13.1%
11	Cultural Leonesa	179,918	12,354	6,608	8,568	+55.8%^{2}
12	Almería	148,954	11,789	4,928	7,093	−5.8%
13	Albacete	140,226	12,438	4,550	6,677	+5.7%^{2}
14	Gimnàstic	121,853	11,133	3,939	5,803	+8.1%
15	Lorca FC	92,511	6,727	1,491	4,405	n/a^{2}
16	Huesca	87,949	5,282	3,005	4,188	+21.3%
17	Numancia	93,484	8,069	2,174	4,065	+39.6%
18	Lugo	79,053	6,512	2,960	3,764	+3.7%
19	Alcorcón	60,127	4,166	1,808	2,863	+6.3%
20	Barcelona B	55,705	5,592	1,327	2,653	+13.7%^{2}
21	Reus	54,274	4,235	1,548	2,584	−32.6%
22	Sevilla Atlético	28,530	4,663	409	1,359	−71.1%^{3}
	League total	4,104,401	29,741	409	8,770	+15.3%

Source: LaLiga.es
Notes:
1: Team played last season in La Liga.
2: Team played last season in Segunda División B.
3: Sevilla Atlético played last season at Ramón Sánchez Pizjuán Stadium.

== Monthly awards ==
Month	Player of the Month		Reference
Month	Player	Club	Reference
September	(Spain) Jaime Mata	Valladolid	
October	(Spain) Borja Iglesias	Zaragoza	
November	(Colombia) Cucho Hernández	Huesca	
December	(Spain) Carlos Hernández	Oviedo	
January	(Spain) Juan Carlos	Lugo	
February	(Spain) Raúl de Tomás	Rayo Vallecano	
March	(Spain) Jony	Sporting Gijón	
April	(Spain) Raúl de Tomás	Rayo Vallecano	
