= José Luis Capdevila =

Spanish footballer

Personal information
- Full name: José Luis Sánchez Capdevila
- Date of birth: 12 February 1981 (age 45)
- Place of birth: Zaragoza, Spain
- Height: 1.80 m (5 ft 11 in)
- Position: Midfielder

Youth career
- Santo Domingo Juventud
- 1995–2000: Real Madrid

Senior career*
Years	Team	Apps	(Gls)
2000–2001	Real Madrid C		
2001–2002	Real Madrid B	7	(0)
2001–2002	→ Alcorcón (loan)	32	(7)
2003	Hércules	14	(2)
2003–2005	Pontevedra	69	(18)
2005–2008	Valladolid	84	(10)
2008–2010	Murcia	69	(8)
2010–2012	Xerez	42	(3)
2012–2013	Huracán	36	(7)
2013–2017	Bolívar	112	(15)
2017–2018	Sport Boys	49	(4)
2019–2020	Unión Adarve	21	(2)
Total		535	(76)

International career
1997	Spain U16	1	(0)

Managerial career
- 2019–2020: Unión Adarve (youth)
- 2020–2021: Alcorcón (youth)
- 2021–2023: Alcorcón B
- 2023–2025: Leganés B
- * Club domestic league appearances and goals

José Luis Sánchez Capdevila (born 12 February 1981) is a Spanish former professional footballer who played as a midfielder, currently a manager.

== Playing career ==
Capdevila was born in Zaragoza, Aragon. After playing three seasons in the Segunda División B (one each with AD Alcorcón, Real Madrid Castilla and Hércules CF) he signed with Pontevedra CF, where his career-best nine goals were not enough to prevent a relegation from Segunda División in 2005.

Capdevila subsequently moved to Real Valladolid, being an instrumental figure in the side's 2007 promotion to La Liga, scoring four goals in 35 games. However, he would feature sparingly in the 2007–08 campaign, making his competition debut on 15 September 2007 in a 2–1 away loss against Valencia CF.

In September 2008, Capdevila joined Real Murcia CF, recently relegated to division two. Two seasons later, as his team dropped down another level, the 29-year-old signed with another club in that tier, Xerez CD.

Capdevila then spent five years in the Bolivian Primera División, with Club Bolívar and Sport Boys Warnes, winning the national championship with the former in 2014–15. He retired in 2020 aged 39, with Spanish amateurs AD Unión Adarve.

== Coaching career ==
Shortly after retiring, Capdevila returned to Alcorcón and was named manager of the Cadete A squad, while also being an assistant of the Juvenil A side. Ahead of the 2021–22 campaign, he took over the Juvenil B before being named manager of the reserves on 23 September 2021, after Jorge Romero was appointed at the first team.

Capdevila led Alcorcón B to a first-ever promotion to Segunda Federación in 2022, but suffered immediate relegation. On 28 June 2023, he was named manager of another reserve team, CD Leganés B also in the Tercera Federación.

== Managerial statistics ==
As of match played 11 May 2025

Managerial record by team and tenure
Team	From	To	Record								Ref
Team	From	To	G	W	D	L	GF	GA	GD	Win %	Ref
Alcorcón B	23 September 2021	1 March 2023	62	26	17	19	87	68	+19	41.94	
Leganés B	28 June 2023	22 May 2025	72	30	24	18	111	75	+36	41.67	
Total			134	56	41	37	198	143	+55	41.79	—

== Honours ==
Pontevedra

- Segunda División B: 2003–04

Valladolid

- Segunda División: 2006–07
