= Robert Costa =

Robert Costa may refer to:

- Robert Costa (footballer) (born 1994), Spanish footballer
- Robert Costa (journalist) (born 1985), political reporter for CBS News
- Robert A. Costa (born 1958), American politician and member of the Maryland House of Delegates

== See also ==
- Bob Costas (sportscaster born 1952 as Robert Quinlan Costas)
