= Jorge Romero =

Jorge Romero may refer to:

- Jorge Romero Brest (1905–1989), Argentine art critic
- Jorge Romero (footballer) (born 1932), Paraguayan footballer
- Jorge Eduardo Romero (born 1939), Argentine football referee
- Jorge Romero Romero (1964–2021), Mexican politician
- Jorge Romero Herrera (born 1979), Mexican politician
- Jorge Romero (football manager) (born 1984), Spanish football manager
