= Santi Coch =

Spanish footballer and manager (1960–2024)

Personal information
- Full name: Santiago Coch Castillo
- Date of birth: 27 May 1960
- Place of birth: Vimbodí i Poblet, Spain
- Date of death: 12 September 2024 (aged 64)
- Position: Left-back

Youth career
- Gimnàstic

Senior career*
| Years | Team | Apps | (Gls) |
| 1977–1994 | Gimnàstic | 464 | (5) |
| 1978–1979 | → La Cava (loan) | 27 | (0) |
| Total | | 491 | (5) |

Managerial career
- 2005–2010: Pobla Mafumet
- 2017–2019: Gimnàstic (assistant)
- * Club domestic league appearances and goals

Santiago "Santi" Coch Castillo (27 May 1960 – 12 September 2024) was a Spanish football player and manager. A left-back, he represented Gimnàstic over the course of 17 campaigns, appearing in 528 official matches.

== Playing career ==
Born in Vimbodí i Poblet, Tarragona, Catalonia, Coch made his senior debut with Gimnàstic de Tarragona in 1977, aged only 17, as his side achieved promotion from the Tercera División. Another promotion followed, and he made his professional debut on 16 September 1979, starting in a 3–2 home win against Deportivo de La Coruña in the Segunda División.

Coch appeared in 23 matches during the 1979–80 season, as Nàstic suffered immediate relegation after finishing 19th. He appeared in Segunda División B but also in the fourth tier for the remainder of his career, retiring in 1994.

== Managerial career ==
In 2005 Coch was appointed manager of Gimnàstic's farm team, CF Pobla de Mafumet. In 2010, he was relieved of his duties, being immediately included in Gimnàstic's backroom staff.

On 9 September 2017, after Lluís Carreras' dismissal, Coch was appointed Rodri's assistant in the first team.

== Personal life and death ==
Coch's family is widely related to football. His older brother Enric was a goalkeeper, while his twin brother Ramón was a forward. His two sons Joel and Denis (both midfielders) represented Pobla, and his nephew Aleix is also a defender.

Coch died on 12 September 2024, at the age of 64.

== See also ==
- List of one-club men
