= Miguel Palanca =

Spanish footballer (born 1987)

Personal information
- Full name: Miguel Palanca Fernández
- Date of birth: 18 December 1987 (age 38)
- Place of birth: Tarragona, Spain
- Height: 1.75 m (5 ft 9 in)
- Position: Winger

Youth career
- La Salle
- 1998–2006: Espanyol

Senior career*
Years	Team	Apps	(Gls)
2006–2008	Espanyol B	49	(13)
2007	Espanyol	1	(0)
2008–2009	Real Madrid B	31	(5)
2008–2010	Real Madrid	3	(0)
2009–2010	→ Castellón (loan)	36	(3)
2010–2013	Elche	71	(5)
2013–2015	Numancia	50	(5)
2015	Adelaide United	14	(1)
2015–2016	Gimnàstic	19	(1)
2016–2017	Korona Kielce	33	(6)
2017–2018	Anorthosis	23	(3)
2018–2019	Goa	7	(3)
2019	Gimnàstic	8	(0)
2019–2020	Andorra	12	(0)
2020–2021	Avilés	6	(0)
Total		363	(45)
- * Club domestic league appearances and goals

Miguel Palanca Fernández (born 18 December 1987) is a Spanish former professional footballer. Mainly a right winger, he also played as a forward.

== Club career ==
Born in Tarragona, Catalonia, Palanca was a product of RCD Espanyol's youth academy, playing once for the first team in 2006–07 then spending the following season solely with the reserves. His La Liga debut arrived on 29 April 2007, as he came on as a substitute for Albert Riera during the second half of a 3–1 away loss against Sevilla FC.

Subsequently, Palanca was sold to Real Madrid. On 13 December 2008 he made his debut for the main squad, replacing Wesley Sneijder in the first half of a 2–0 away defeat to FC Barcelona. Again from the bench, he helped his team beat Valencia CF one week later at the Santiago Bernabéu Stadium (1–0).

Palanca was loaned to CD Castellón of the Segunda División for 2009–10. The following campaign, after the club's relegation, he signed a two-year contract with another side in that league, Elche CF, with Real Madrid having an option to re-buy on any given period during that timeframe.

On 27 January 2015, after one and a half seasons with CD Numancia also in the second tier, Palanca signed with Australian club Adelaide United FC. He was released at the end of the season, after his contract was not renewed.

On 8 July 2015, Palanca signed a one-year deal with Gimnàstic de Tarragona, recently returned to the second tier. He scored his first goals for his hometown team on 9 September in a 2–2 home draw with neighbours Girona FC in the second round of the Copa del Rey, also converting the decisive attempt in the subsequent penalty shootout.

Palanca moved abroad again on 20 July 2016, agreeing to a two-year contract with Poland's Korona Kielce. Coming from the bench, he netted his first goal on 6 August in a 4–1 home Ekstraklasa win over Lech Poznań.

On 14 August 2018, Palanca joined Indian Super League club FC Goa. The following 31 January, he returned to Gimnàstic on a short-term deal.

On 20 September 2020, Palanca signed a two-year contract with Tercera División side Real Avilés Industrial CF. He suffered a femoral fracture in a match on 13 December against CD Praviano, and announced his retirement in September 2021 aged 33.

== Personal life ==
Palanca's father, Santiago, played as a striker for Gimnàstic, scoring a record 48 goals at their Nou Estadi.

== Career statistics ==
Appearances and goals by club, season and competition
Club	Season	League			National cup (Note: Includes Copa del Rey, Polish Cup)		Other		Total	
Club	Season	Division	Apps	Goals	Apps	Goals	Apps	Goals	Apps	Goals
Espanyol B	2006–07	Segunda División B	25	6	—		—		25	6
Espanyol B	2007–08	Segunda División B	24	7	—		—		24	7
Espanyol B	Total		49	13	—		—		49	13
Espanyol	2006–07	La Liga	1	0	0	0	—		1	0
Real Madrid B	2008–09	Segunda División B	31	5	—		—		31	5
Real Madrid	2008–09	La Liga	3	0	0	0	0	0	3	0
Castellón (loan)	2009–10	Segunda División	36	3	0	0	—		36	3
Elche	2010–11	Segunda División	30	4	2	0	1 (Note: Appearance in La Liga play-offs)	0	33	4
Elche	2011–12	Segunda División	25	1	2	1	—		27	2
Elche	2012–13	Segunda División	16	0	1	0	—		17	0
Elche	Total		71	5	5	1	1	0	77	6
Numancia	2013–14	Segunda División	33	3	1	0	—		34	3
Numancia	2014–15	Segunda División	17	2	0	0	—		17	2
Numancia	Total		50	5	1	0	—		51	5
Adelaide United	2014–15	A-League	14	1	0	0	—		14	1
Gimnàstic	2015–16	Segunda División	19	1	1	2	—		20	3
Korona Kielce	2016–17	Ekstraklasa	33	6	1	0	—		34	6
Anorthosis	2017–18	Cypriot First Division	23	3	0	0	—		23	3
Goa	2018–19	Indian Super League	7	3	0	0	—		7	3
Gimnàstic	2018–19	Segunda División	8	0	0	0	—		8	0
Andorra	2019–20	Segunda División B	12	0	1	0	—		13	0
Avilés	2020–21	Tercera División	6	0	0	0	—		6	0
Career total			363	45	9	3	1	0	373	48
