= Fran Gil =

Spanish footballer

Personal information
- Full name: Francisco Gil García
- Date of birth: 2 December 2005 (age 20)
- Place of birth: Molina de Segura, Spain
- Height: 1.88 m (6 ft 2 in)
- Position: Centre-back

Team information
- Current team: Gimnàstic

Youth career
- 2020–2024: Elche

Senior career*
Years	Team	Apps	(Gls)
2022–2024	Elche B	9	(0)
2024–2025	Villarreal C	28	(0)
2025–2026	Villarreal B	4	(0)
2026	→ Europa (loan)	13	(0)
2026–	Gimnàstic	0	(0)
- * Club domestic league appearances and goals as of 23 May 2026

Francisco "Fran" Gil García (born 2 December 2005) is a Spanish footballer who plays as a centre-back for Gimnàstic de Tarragona.

== Career ==
Born in Molina de Segura, Region of Murcia, Gil represented Elche CF as a youth, and made his senior debut with the reserves on 4 December 2022, starting in a 2–1 Tercera Federación home win over CD Castellón B. In February 2024, after expressing his desire to leave the club, he was separated from the Juvenil and B-team squads until the expiration of his contract.

On 11 June 2024, Gil joined Villarreal CF on a two-year deal, being initially assigned to the C-team in Tercera Federación. On 14 March of the following year, after already having appeared with the B-side in Primera Federación, he renewed his link until 2028.

On 2 February 2026, after being rarely used at Villarreal B, Gil moved to fellow third division side CE Europa on loan until June. He immediately established himself as a first-choice at his new side, as they missed out promotion in the play-offs.

On 24 July 2026, Gil signed a two-year contract with Gimnàstic de Tarragona, still in division three.
