= Toni Gabarri =

Spanish footballer

Personal information
- Full name: Antonio Gabarri Pachés
- Date of birth: 11 February 2002 (age 24)
- Place of birth: Benicàssim, Spain
- Height: 1.84 m (6 ft 0 in)
- Position: Midfielder

Team information
- Current team: Gimnàstic

Youth career
- 2011–2019: Villarreal
- 2019–2020: Roda
- 2020–2021: Villarreal

Senior career*
Years	Team	Apps	(Gls)
2021–2022	Villarreal C	1	(0)
2021–2022	→ Roda (loan)	8	(0)
2022–2023	Cartaya	19	(0)
2023–2024	Patacona	28	(2)
2024–2026	Castellón B	55	(0)
2026–	Gimnàstic	0	(0)
- * Club domestic league appearances and goals as of 23 May 2026

Antonio "Toni" Gabarri Pachés (born 11 February 2002) is a Spanish professional footballer who plays as a midfielder for Gimnàstic de Tarragona.

== Career ==
Born in Benicàssim, Valencian Community, Gabarri joined Villarreal CF's youth sides in 2011, aged nine. He made his senior debut while on loan at affiliate side CD Roda in 2021, in Tercera División RFEF, before returning to the Groguets in March 2022 and being assigned to the C-team also in the fifth tier.

On 22 September 2022, Gabarri was announced at AD Cartaya also in division five. The following July, he moved to fellow league team Patacona CF, before signing for CD Castellón's reserves on 1 June 2024.

On 14 July 2025, after helping Castellón B to their first-ever promotion to Segunda Federación, Gabarri renewed his link with the club for a further year. On 18 June of the following year, after an immediate relegation, he agreed to a two-year contract with Primera Federación side Gimnàstic de Tarragona.
