= José Antonio Gordillo =

Spanish footballer (born 1974)

Personal information
- Full name: José Antonio Gordillo Luna
- Date of birth: 24 January 1974 (age 52)
- Place of birth: Morón de la Frontera, Spain
- Height: 1.84 m (6 ft 0 in)
- Position: Centre back

Youth career
- Betis

Senior career*
Years	Team	Apps	(Gls)
1992–1996	Betis B	83	(9)
1996–1997	Castellón	33	(0)
1997–1998	Murcia	22	(0)
1998–2003	Gimnàstic	93	(5)
2003	Pontevedra	18	(1)
2003–2004	Jaén	1	(0)
Total		260	(15)

Managerial career
- 2008–2009: Écija (assistant)
- 2009: Écija (interim)
- 2009–2010: Betis C
- 2016: Morón
- 2018: Levante (assistant)
- 2018: Gimnàstic
- 2019–2020: Betis (youth)
- 2020–2022: Sporting Gijón (assistant)
- * Club domestic league appearances and goals

José Antonio Gordillo Luna (born 24 January 1974) is a Spanish retired footballer who played as a central defender, and is a manager.

== Playing career ==
Gordillo was born in Morón de la Frontera, Seville, Andalusia, and represented Real Betis as a youth. He made his senior debut with the reserves on 1 November 1992, starting in a 1–1 Segunda División B away draw against Real Jaén.

Gordillo subsequently represented CD Castellón, Real Murcia and Gimnàstic de Tarragona in the third division, achieving promotion with the latter in 2001. He made his professional debut on 25 August of that year, playing the full 90 minutes in a 0–0 home draw against Racing de Santander.

After suffering relegation, Gordillo featured rarely during the 2002–03 campaign and moved to fellow third division side Pontevedra CF in January 2003. In July he joined Jaén, but retired in the following year after appearing in only one match.

== Managerial career ==
In 2008, Gordillo was appointed assistant at Écija Balompié. On 28 January 2009, after Pedro Buenaventura's dismissal, he was appointed interim; his reign lasted until 14 February, after the appointment of Oli.

Gordillo was named manager of his first club Betis' C-team in July 2009. He left the post the following January, after being appointed technical secretary at Gimnàstic.

In 2011 Gordillo returned to Betis, as a coordinator of the youth setup. On 4 December 2013, he was named CE Sabadell FC director of football, and subsequently worked as a scout for CA Osasuna.

In June 2016, Gordillo took over UD Morón in the regional leagues, but was sacked on 26 October. On 28 February 2017, he was named Pepe Mel's data analyst at Deportivo de La Coruña.

On 6 March of the following year, Gordillo was appointed assistant of Paco López at Levante UD, but terminated his contract on 14 May. Just hours after departing, he was named at the helm of Nàstic, seriously threatened with relegation in Segunda División.

On 6 June 2018, after avoiding relegation, Gordillo renewed with Gimnàstic for a further campaign, but was sacked on 22 October as the club was ranked last. The following July, he was named at the helm of the Juvenil A side of former club Betis.

On 6 August 2020, Gordillo joined David Gallego's staff at Sporting de Gijón.

== Managerial statistics ==
As of 21 October 2018

Managerial record by team and tenure
Team	Nat	From	To	Record								Ref
Team	Nat	From	To	G	W	D	L	GF	GA	GD	Win %	Ref
Écija (interim)	(Spain)	28 January 2009	14 February 2009	2	2	0	0	2	0	+2	100.00	
Betis C	(Spain)	1 July 2009	6 January 2010	18	7	7	4	32	18	+14	38.89	
Morón	(Spain)	30 June 2016	26 October 2016	7	2	2	3	11	11	+0	28.57	
Gimnàstic	(Spain)	14 May 2018	22 October 2018	14	4	3	7	14	22	−8	28.57	
Total				41	15	12	14	59	51	+8	36.59	—
