= Rodri (footballer, born 1971) =

Spanish footballer and manager

Personal information
- Full name: Antonio Rodríguez Saravia
- Date of birth: 28 January 1971 (age 55)
- Place of birth: Barcelona, Spain
- Height: 1.77 m (5 ft 10 in)
- Position: Forward

Youth career
- Santfeliuenc
- 1988–1989: Barcelona

Senior career*
| Years | Team | Apps | (Gls) |
| 1987–1988 | Santfeliuenc | | |
| 1989–1990 | Martinenc | | |
| 1990 | Teruel | 14 | (3) |
| 1990–1991 | Levante Las Planas | | |
| 1991–1992 | Igualada | 41 | (20) |
| 1992–1993 | Balaguer | 27 | (15) |
| 1993–1994 | Gimnàstic | 28 | (5) |
| 1994–1995 | Tàrrega | 28 | (9) |
| 1995–1996 | Santboià | 32 | (15) |
| 1996–1999 | Palamós | 83 | (27) |
| 1999–2000 | Gavà | 4 | (1) |
| 2000 | Palamós | | |
| 2000–2002 | Peralada | | |
| 2002–2004 | Olot | | |

Managerial career
- 2008–2009: Peralada
- 2014–2016: Olot
- 2017: Pobla Mafumet
- 2017–2018: Gimnàstic
- 2018–2019: Extremadura
- 2020–2021: Inter d'Escaldes
- * Club domestic league appearances and goals

Antonio Rodríguez Saravia (born 28 January 1971), commonly known as Rodri, is a Spanish retired footballer, who played as a forward, and manager. He was most recently an individual development coach at Premier League club Aston Villa.

== Playing career ==
Born in Barcelona, Catalonia, Rodri joined Barcelona's youth setup in 1988 from Santfeliuenc, but was released in the following year. He subsequently joined Martinenc, and in January 1990 he moved to Teruel in Segunda División B.

In the following five seasons, Rodri rarely settle into a club, representing Levante Las Planas, Igualada, Balaguer, Gimnàstic, Tàrrega and Santboià. In 1996 he signed for Tercera División side Palamós, helping in their promotion to the third division in 1998.

Rodri also had a brief stint at Gavà during the 1999–2000 season, but returned to Palamós after appearing rarely. He resumed his career with Peralada and Olot, retiring with the latter in 2004, aged 33.

== Managerial career ==
Rodri started his career as Raül Agné's assistant at Girona in 2010. On 16 March 2012, he was appointed assistant manager at Olot, but was in charge of the first team along with Àlex Terma during his spell.

On 10 December 2012, Rodri left Olot and moved to Cádiz, again as Agné's second. On 25 November 2014 he returned to his previous club, now named first team manager.

Rodri was sacked on 22 February 2016 due to his poor results, and reunited with Agné at Real Zaragoza on 28 October. On 22 June of the following year, he returned to Nàstic after being named Pobla Mafumet manager.

On 9 September 2017, after Lluís Carreras' dismissal, Rodri was named interim manager of the first team in Segunda División. His first professional match in charge occurred eight days later, a 3–1 home win against Albacete. After three wins in five matches, Rodri was confirmed as manager until the end of the season. On 29 January 2018, he was sacked.

On 25 September 2018, Tenerife announced that Rodri would join the technical staff, working as an assistant coach. On 13 November, he was named Extremadura manager, with the club also in the second division; on 16 February 2019, he was dismissed.

In November 2020, Rodri was named manager of Andorran Primera Divisió club Inter d'Escaldes. He chose to depart the club on 22 February 2021, after being offered the role of development coach at La Liga club Villarreal. He subsequently followed Villarreal manager Unai Emery to join Premier League club Aston Villa in the same role in November 2022. On 2 July 2026, Aston Villa announced he had departed the club.

== Managerial statistics ==
As of 23 May 2021

Managerial record by team and tenure
| Team | Nat | From | To | Record | | | | | | | | Ref |
| Team | Nat | From | To | G | W | D | L | GF | GA | GD | Win % | Ref |
|---|---|---|---|---|---|---|---|---|---|---|---|---|
| Olot | (Spain) | 25 November 2014 | 22 February 2016 | 50 | 13 | 19 | 18 | 51 | 56 | −5 | 26.00 | |
| Pobla Mafumet | (Spain) | 22 June 2017 | 9 September 2017 | 3 | 0 | 1 | 2 | 1 | 4 | −3 | 0.00 | |
| Gimnàstic | (Spain) | 9 September 2017 | 29 January 2018 | 20 | 8 | 3 | 9 | 27 | 26 | +1 | 40.00 | |
| Extremadura | (Spain) | 13 November 2018 | 16 February 2019 | 13 | 3 | 5 | 5 | 12 | 14 | −2 | 23.08 | |
| Inter d'Escaldes | (Andorra) | 29 November 2020 | 22 February 2021 | 11 | 7 | 2 | 2 | 21 | 6 | +15 | 63.64 | |
| Total | | | | 97 | 31 | 30 | 36 | 112 | 106 | +6 | 31.96 | — |
