= Juan Pedro Pina =

Spanish footballer

Personal information
- Full name: Juan Pedro Pina Martínez
- Date of birth: 29 June 1985 (age 41)
- Place of birth: Murcia, Spain
- Height: 1.80 m (5 ft 11 in)
- Position: Right back

Youth career
- 1999–2001: Murcia
- 2001–2003: Atlético Madrid
- 2003–2004: Murcia

Senior career*
Years	Team	Apps	(Gls)
2004–2008	Murcia B		
2008	Murcia	3	(0)
2008–2010	Sangonera	63	(2)
2010–2012	Alcoyano	58	(0)
2012	UCAM Murcia	15	(0)
2013	Doxa	14	(0)
2013–2018	Lorca	148	(1)
2018–2019	Recreativo	30	(0)
2019–2022	Orihuela	78	(0)
- * Club domestic league appearances and goals

Juan Pedro Pina Martínez (born 29 June 1985) is a Spanish former professional footballer who played as a right back.

== Career statistics ==
As of 15 November 2017

Club	Season	League			Cup		Other		Total	
Club	Season	Division	Apps	Goals	Apps	Goals	Apps	Goals	Apps	Goals
Murcia	2004–05	Segunda División	0	0	1	0	—		1	0
Murcia	2007–08	La Liga	3	0	0	0	—		3	0
Murcia	Total		3	0	1	0	—		4	0
Sangonera	2008–09	Segunda División B	33	2	0	0	—		33	2
Sangonera	2009–10	Segunda División B	30	0	0	0	—		30	0
Sangonera	Total		63	2	0	0	—		63	2
Alcoyano	2010–11	Segunda División B	35	0	1	0	6 (Note: Appearances in Promotion Play-offs)	0	42	0
Alcoyano	2011–12	Segunda División	23	0	1	0	—		24	0
Alcoyano	Total		58	0	2	0	6	0	66	0
UCAM Murcia	2012–13	Segunda División B	15	0	0	0	—		15	0
Doxa	2012–13	Cypriot First Division	14	0	0	0	—		14	0
Lorca	2013–14	Segunda División B	25	0	1	0	—		26	0
Lorca	2014–15	Segunda División B	31	1	0	0	—		31	1
Lorca	2015–16	Segunda División B	34	0	0	0	—		34	0
Lorca	2016–17	Segunda División B	33	0	2	0	4	0	39	0
Lorca	2017–18	Segunda División	8	0	1	0	—		9	0
Lorca	Total		131	1	4	0	4	0	139	1
Career total			284	3	7	0	10	0	301	3
