= Santiago Palanca =

Spanish footballer and manager

Santi Palanca
Personal information
- Full name: Santiago Palanca Molina
- Date of birth: 23 March 1957 (age 69)
- Place of birth: Lucena, Spain
- Height: 1.69 m (5 ft 7 in)
- Position: Winger

Senior career*
Years	Team	Apps	(Gls)
1975–1976	Torreforta		
1976–1982	Gimnàstic		
1982–1985	Espanyol	14	(0)
1985–1987	Sabadell	16	(1)
1987–1988	Gimnàstic	24	(10)
1988–1989	Tortosa		
Total		54	(11)

Managerial career
- 1990–1993: Torreforta
- 1993–1996: Torredembarra
- 1996–1999: Valls
- 1999–2001: Reus
- 2005–2009: Vilanova
- 2010–2011: Rapitenca
- * Club domestic league appearances and goals

Santiago "Santi" Palanca Molina (born 23 March 1957) is a Spanish footballer and manager, who is currently Gimnàstic de Tarragona's director of youth football.

Palanca played as a right winger, with his career being mainly associated to Gimnàstic, where he holds the record of most goals at the Nou Estadi with 48.

== Playing career ==
Born in Lucena, Córdoba, Andalusia, Palanca made his debut as a senior with CDC Torreforta in the 1975–76 season, in the regional leagues. In 1976 he joined Tercera División side Gimnàstic de Tarragona, being a regular starter in the club's two consecutive promotions.

Palanca made his professional debut on 2 September 1979, starting in a 0–3 away loss against Recreativo de Huelva for the second level championship. He scored his first goals in the category fourteen days later, contributing with a brace in a 3–2 home win against Deportivo de La Coruña; it would be his only two goals of the campaign, which ended in relegation to Segunda División B.

Palanca signed for RCD Espanyol in the summer of 1982, moving straight to La Liga. He only made his debut in the category on 3 September 1983, playing the last seven minutes in a 1–4 home defeat to Atlético Madrid.

Palanca moved to second division club CE Sabadell FC in 1985, contributing rarely with the club in his first season (which ended in top tier promotion), but failing to feature a single minute in his second. He subsequently returned to Nàstic in the third division, scoring ten goals during his one-year spell.

Palanca finished his spell for Gimnàstic with 62 goals in 225 matches overall. He subsequently represented fourth division side CD Tortosa before retiring in 1989 at the age of 32.

== Managerial career ==
Palanca began his managerial career with his first club Torreforta in 1990. In 1996, after a three-year spell at UD Torredembarra, he was appointed UE Valls manager, taking the club to Primera Catalana in his first season.

In 1999, Palanca was named manager of CF Reus Deportiu in the fourth division, being in charge for two seasons before moving to the role of director of football. In 2005 he was appointed at the helm of fellow fourth tier side CF Vilanova, taking the club to their best-ever position in 2005–06; he left the club in 2009.

On 21 May 2010, Palanca was appointed manager of UE Rapitenca. The following March he resigned, but later decided to take back on the decision and remained in charge of the club until the end of the season.

On 28 June 2018, Palanca returned to his main club Gimnàstic as the director of youth football.

== Personal life ==
Palanca's son, Miguel, also a winger, represented Gimnàstic during the 2015–16 season.
