= Valero Serer =

Spanish footballer (1932–2022)

Personal information
- Full name: Valero Serer Pascual
- Date of birth: 2 November 1932
- Place of birth: Valencia, Spain
- Date of death: 31 July 2022 (aged 89)
- Position: Forward

Senior career*
Years	Team	Apps	(Gls)
1953–1954	Mestalla	9	(3)
1954–1955	Gandía		
1955–1959	Zaragoza	33	(22)
1959–1970	Gimnàstic	328	(181)
Total		370	(206)
- * Club domestic league appearances and goals

Valero Serer Pascual (2 November 1932 – 31 July 2022) was a Spanish footballer who played as a forward.

He was Gimnàstic de Tarragona's all-time scoring leader, with 181 goals over the course of 11 seasons.

== Career ==
Born in Valencia, Serer started his professional career with local CD Mestalla, scoring three goals in nine matches in Segunda División. In 1955, after one full season at CF Gandía, he joined Real Zaragoza also in the second level.

Serer achieved promotion to La Liga in his first campaign, also being the club's top goalscorer with 11 goals. He made his debut in the category on 14 October 1956, starting and scoring his team's only goal in a 4–1 away loss against Real Valladolid.

In December 1959 Serer was released, after falling down in the pecking order, and immediately joined Gimnàstic de Tarragona. With the granas he scored 181 goals over the course of 11 seasons, and retired in 1970 at the age of 38.
