= Víctor Villote =

Spanish footballer

Personal information
- Full name: Víctor Villote Alegre
- Date of birth: 1 July 2004 (age 22)
- Place of birth: Barcelona, Spain
- Height: 1.83 m (6 ft 0 in)
- Position: Left-back

Team information
- Current team: Gimnàstic (on loan from Las Palmas)
- Number: 3

Youth career
- Espanyol
- Cornellà
- 2018–2019: Espanyol
- 2019–2020: EF Gavà
- 2020–2021: Unificación Bellvitge
- 2021–2022: Sants
- 2022–2023: Gimnàstic Manresa

Senior career*
Years	Team	Apps	(Gls)
2023–2025	Atlètic Lleida	59	(3)
2025–	Las Palmas B	29	(1)
2026–	→ Gimnàstic (loan)	1	(0)
- * Club domestic league appearances and goals as of 5 September 2026

Víctor Villote Alegre (born 1 July 2004) is a Spanish footballer who plays as a left-back for Gimnàstic de Tarragona, on loan from UD Las Palmas.

== Career ==
Born in Barcelona, Catalonia, Villote began his career with RCD Espanyol, and subsequently represented local sides UE Cornellà, EF Gavà, UD Unificación Bellvitge, UE Sants and Club Gimnàstic de Manresa. On 22 September 2023, after finishing his formation, he was announced at CE Atlètic Lleida of the Lliga Elit.

On 17 July 2025, after achieving two consecutive promotions, Villote signed for UD Las Palmas and was initially assigned to the reserves in Segunda Federación. On 1 September of the following year, he moved to Primera Federación side Gimnàstic de Tarragona on a one-year loan deal.
