= Marc Álvarez =

Spanish footballer (born 2001)

Personal information
- Full name: Marc Álvarez García
- Date of birth: 7 June 2001 (age 25)
- Place of birth: Torredembarra, Spain
- Height: 1.75 m (5 ft 9 in)
- Position: Winger

Team information
- Current team: Castellonense (on loan from Gimnàstic)

Youth career
- Torredembarra
- 2015–2020: Gimnàstic

Senior career*
Years	Team	Apps	(Gls)
2020–2022	Pobla Mafumet	47	(4)
2022–	Gimnàstic	35	(1)
2024–2025	→ Tarazona (loan)	19	(0)
2026–	→ Castellonense (loan)	0	(0)
- * Club domestic league appearances and goals as of 1 July 2025

Marc Álvarez García (born 7 June 2001) is a Spanish professional footballer who plays as a left winger for UD Castellonense, on loan from Gimnàstic de Tarragona.

== Career ==
Álvarez was born in Torredembarra, Tarragona, Catalonia, and joined Gimnàstic de Tarragona's youth setup from hometown club UD Torredembarra. On 5 July 2020, after finishing his formation, he was promoted to the farm team in Tercera División.

Álvarez made his senior debut on 1 November 2020, coming on as a late substitute for Bernat Guiu in a 3–1 home loss against CE Europa. He scored his first goal the following 2 April, netting Pobla's third in a 4–1 home routing of CF Igualada.

Álvarez made his first team debut with Nàstic on 28 August 2022, starting and scoring his team's second in a 2–2 Primera Federación home draw against UD Logroñés. On 13 October, after being regularly used in the main squad, he renewed his contract until 2025, but suffered a knee injury in November which sidelined him for the remainder of the campaign.

On 24 July 2024, Álvarez renewed his link with Gimnàstic until 2026, and was immediately loaned to fellow third division team SD Tarazona for one year. In May of the following year, he suffered another knee injury on training, being sidelined until the following February.

On 17 July 2026, Álvarez agreed to a new one-year contract with Gimnàstic, with an option for a further season, but was loaned to Segunda Federación side UD Castellonense twelve days later.
