= Shiryu Fujiwara =

Japanese footballer

Shiryu Fujiwara 藤原志龍
Personal information
- Date of birth: 23 September 2000 (age 26)
- Place of birth: Kitajima, Tokushima, Japan
- Height: 1.72 m (5 ft 8 in)
- Position: Midfielder

Team information
- Current team: Tegevajaro Miyazaki (on loan from Tokushima Vortis)
- Number: 26

Youth career
- –2018: Tokushima Vortis

Senior career*
Years	Team	Apps	(Gls)
2018–	Tokushima Vortis	20	(0)
2019–2020	→ Portimonense U23 (loan)	8	(0)
2023	→ FC Ryukyu (loan)	6	(0)
2024–	Tegevajaro Miyazaki (loan)	3	(0)
- * Club domestic league appearances and goals as of 18 September 2024

Shiryu Fujiwara (藤原志龍, Fujiwara Shiryu; born 23 September 2000) is a Japanese footballer who plays as a midfielder for Tegevajaro Miyazaki, on loan from Tokushima Vortis.

== Career ==
Fujiwara was born in Kitajima, Tokushima. Raised by Tokushima Vortis youth ranks, he was given by manager Ricardo Rodríguez the chance of debuting as a pro in 2018 season, being subbed in for Yuto Uchida in the opening game against Fagiano Okayama at age 17 years and 173 days, making him the youngest debutant in the club’s history. In September 2018, the club announced his promotion to the top team for 2019 season.

Fujiwara had been training with Portimonense S.C. U-23 team from 19 to 31 August and on 4 September it was confirmed, that he had joined the club on loan until the end of the 2019-20 season.

== Career statistics ==
Updated to end of 2018 season.

Club performance			League		Cup		Total	
Season	Club	League	Apps	Goals	Apps	Goals	Apps	Goals
Japan			League		Emperor's Cup		Total	
2018	Tokushima Vortis	J2 League	4	0	2	0	6	0
Career total			4	0	2	0	6	0
