= Taichi Takeda =

Japanese footballer (born 1997)

Taichi Takeda 武田 太一
Personal information
- Date of birth: 22 April 1997 (age 29)
- Place of birth: Katano, Osaka, Japan
- Height: 1.84 m (6 ft 0 in)
- Position: Forward

Youth career
- Katano FC
- Hirakata FC
- 2013–2015: Gamba Osaka
- 2016–2019: Waseda University

Senior career*
Years	Team	Apps	(Gls)
2020–2022	Tokushima Vortis	0	(0)
2021	→ Nagano Parceiro (loan)	6	(0)
2022	→ FC Osaka (loan)	0	(0)
2023	FC Osaka	0	(0)
- * Club domestic league appearances and goals as of End of career

Taichi Takeda (武田 太一, Takeda Taichi; born 22 April 1997) is a Japanese former footballer who played as a forward. His career was severely affected by injuries, and he retired at the end of the 2023 season with six career appearances in the J3 League.

== Early life ==
Takeda was born in Katano, Osaka. He initially took up rugby in his first year of elementary school before switching to football in his second year. He played for Katano FC as a child and Hirakata FC through middle school. During high school, he joined the Gamba Osaka youth academy but was not promoted to the first team.

== University career ==
Takeda enrolled in the Sports Science department at Waseda University in 2016. In his third year, he established himself as a regular starter, scoring 10 goals and contributing to Waseda's Kanto University Football League Division 1 title. He was selected for the All-Japan University XI in 2018 and 2019, and for the Denso Cup Challenge Soccer All-Japan XI in 2019. However, in his fourth year he suffered an anterior cruciate ligament tear that kept him out for an extended period.

== Professional career ==
=== Tokushima Vortis ===
Despite still recovering from his knee injury, Takeda signed with Tokushima Vortis ahead of the 2020 season. He did not make any appearances for the club during their 2020 J2 League or 2021 J1 League campaigns.

=== Loan to AC Nagano Parceiro ===
In 2021, Takeda joined AC Nagano Parceiro on a development loan in the J3 League. He made his professional debut on 10 April 2021 in a J3 match against Fujieda MYFC. He made six league appearances during the loan spell but did not score.

=== FC Osaka ===
In February 2022, Takeda was loaned to FC Osaka, then competing in the Japan Football League. He did not make any appearances during the loan.

In January 2023, his permanent transfer to FC Osaka was confirmed as the club entered the J3 League. He also took on a dual role in the club's business department, assisting with public relations activities. However, injuries again prevented him from making any appearances during the 2023 season, and he announced his retirement from professional football at the end of the year.

== Post-playing career ==
In January 2024, Takeda joined the FC Osaka front office as a sales and hometown activities staff member in the business division.

== Career statistics ==
=== Club ===
Club	Season	League			National Cup		League Cup		Other		Total	
Club	Season	Division	Apps	Goals	Apps	Goals	Apps	Goals	Apps	Goals	Apps	Goals
Tokushima Vortis	2020	J2 League	0	0	0	0	0	0	0	0	0	0
Tokushima Vortis	2021	J1 League	0	0	0	0	0	0	0	0	0	0
Tokushima Vortis	Total		0	0	0	0	0	0	0	0	0	0
Nagano Parceiro (loan)	2021	J3 League	6	0	1	0	–		0	0	7	0
FC Osaka (loan)	2022	Japan Football League	0	0	0	0	–		0	0	0	0
FC Osaka	2023	J3 League	0	0	0	0	–		0	0	0	0
Career total			6	0	1	0	0	0	0	0	7	0
