= Shinnosuke Katsushima =

Japanese footballer

Personal information
- Date of birth: 29 June 2003 (age 23)
- Place of birth: Yasu, Shiga, Japan
- Height: 1.79 m (5 ft 10 in)
- Position: Winger

Team information
- Current team: Gimnàstic

Youth career
- Kitano SC
- 2016–2021: Kyoto Sanga

Senior career*
| Years | Team | Apps | (Gls) |
| 2022–2023 | Tokushima Vortis | 0 | (0) |
| 2022–2023 | → Girona B (loan) | 28 | (4) |
| 2023–2026 | Girona B | 42 | (5) |
| 2025 | → Europa (loan) | 5 | (0) |
| 2026– | Gimnàstic | 0 | (0) |

International career
| 2018 | Japan U15 | 1 | (2) |
| 2018 | Japan U16 | 1 | (1) |
- * Club domestic league appearances and goals as of 23 May 2026

Shinnosuke Katsushima (Japanese: 勝島 新之助; born 29 June 2003) is a Japanese footballer who plays for Spanish club Gimnàstic de Tarragona. Mainly a winger, he can also play as an attacking midfielder.

== Club career ==
Born in Yasu, Shiga Prefecture, Katsushima is a Kyoto Sanga youth graduate. On 2 February 2022, Tokushima Vortis announced his signing, with an immediate loan to Spanish Tercera División RFEF side Girona FC B until June 2023.

On 29 June 2023, Girona exercised Katsushima's buyout clause, with the player signing a contract until 2026. He suffered a knee injury in January of the following year, being sidelined for nine months.

On 3 February 2025, Katsushima was loaned to Segunda Federación side CE Europa, until June. Back to the Blanquivermells in July, he became a regular starter for the B-side, now also in division four.

On 20 June 2026, Katsushima signed a two-year deal with Gimnàstic de Tarragona in Primera Federación.

== International career ==
Katsushima represented Japan at under-15 and under-16 levels.
