= Soya Takada =

Japanese footballer

Personal information
- Full name: Soya Takada
- Date of birth: 15 August 2001 (age 25)
- Place of birth: Saitama, Japan
- Height: 1.80 m (5 ft 11 in)
- Position: Forward

Team information
- Current team: Tokushima Vortis
- Number: 24

Youth career
- Fezonts FC
- Konan Minami SS
- Sakado Diplomats
- –2020: Omiya Ardija

Senior career*
Years	Team	Apps	(Gls)
2020–2024	Omiya Ardija	31	(0)
2023–2024	→ Tokushima Vortis (loan)	43	(0)
2025–	Tokushima Vortis	46	(0)

International career
2018	Japan U17	6	(1)
2019	Japan U18	3	(0)
- * Club domestic league appearances and goals as of 14 August 2026

Soya Takada (髙田 颯也, Takada Soya; born 15 August 2001) is a Japanese professional footballer who plays as a forward for J2 League club Tokushima Vortis.

== Early life ==
Soya was born in Saitama. He played for Fezonts FC, Konan Minami SS, Sakado Diplomats and Omiya Ardija during his youth.

== Career ==
Soya made his league debut for Omiya against Ventforet Kofu on the 19 July 2020.

Soya made his league debut for Tokushima Vortis against Montedio Yamagata on the 17 June 2023.

== International career ==
Soya has caps at international youth level for Japan.

== Career statistics ==
As of match played 2 November 2025

Appearances and goals by club, season and competition
Club	Season	League			Emperor's Cup		J.League Cup		Other		Total	
Club	Season	Division	Apps	Goals	Apps	Goals	Apps	Goals	Apps	Goals	Apps	Goals
Omiya Ardija	2020	J2 League	13	0	0	0	0	0	0	0	13	0
Omiya Ardija	2021	J2 League	4	0	0	0	0	0	0	0	4	0
Omiya Ardija	2022	J2 League	14	0	2	0	0	0	0	0	14	0
Omiya Ardija	Total		31	0	2	0	0	0	0	0	33	0
Tokushima Vortis (loan)	2023	J2 League	9	0	2	0	0	0	0	0	11	0
Tokushima Vortis (loan)	2024	J2 League	34	0	2	0	0	0	0	0	36	0
Tokushima Vortis	2025	J2 League	30	0	2	0	1	0	0	0	33	0
Tokushima Vortis	Total		73	0	6	0	1	0	0	0	80	0
Career total			104	0	8	0	1	0	0	0	113	0
