= CD Roces =

Spanish football club

- Full name: Club Deportivo Roces
- Founded: 1952
- Ground: Campo de Covadonga, Gijón, Asturias, Spain
- Capacity: 1,000
- Manager: Florín Pérez
- League: Primera Asturfútbol
- 2024–25: Tercera Federación – Group 2, 18th of 18 (relegated)
- Website: www.cdroces.es
Home colours	Away colours

Club Deportivo Roces, also known as TSK Roces by sponsorship reasons, is a Spanish football club based in the neighbourhood of Roces, Gijón in the autonomous community of Asturias. They play in Primera Asturfútbol.

== History ==
Founded in 1952, CD Roces is one of the most important farm teams in Asturias, and its under-18 team played in the División de Honor several seasons. The senior team was re-opened in 2004 after several years without competing. Ten years later, Roces promoted to Tercera División for the first time in its history.

== Season to season ==
Season	Tier	Division	Place	Copa del Rey
1982–83	7	2ª Reg.	12th	
1983–84	7	2ª Reg.	7th	
1984–85	7	2ª Reg.	5th	
1985–86	7	2ª Reg.	4th	
1986–2004	DNP			
2004–05	7	2ª Reg.	4th	
2005–06	6	1ª Reg.	3rd	
2006–07	5	Reg. Pref.	18th	
2007–08	6	1ª Reg.	13th	
2008–09	6	1ª Reg.	3rd	
2009–10	6	1ª Reg.	3rd	
2010–11	6	1ª Reg.	1st	
2011–12	5	Reg. Pref.	9th	
2012–13	5	Reg. Pref.	8th	
2013–14	5	Reg. Pref.	1st	
2014–15	4	3ª	15th	
2015–16	4	3ª	20th	
2016–17	5	Reg. Pref.	1st	
2017–18	4	3ª	20th	
2018–19	5	Reg. Pref.	8th	

Season	Tier	Division	Place	Copa del Rey
2019–20	5	Reg. Pref.	4th	
2020–21	5	Reg. Pref.	1st	
2021–22	5	3ª RFEF	17th	
2022–23	6	1ª RFFPA	6th	
2023–24	6	1ª Astur.	4th	
2024–25	5	3ª Fed.	20th	
2025–26	6	1ª Astur.		

- 3 seasons in Tercera División
- 2 seasons in Tercera División RFEF/Tercera Federación

== Notable players ==
- (Spain) Juanele

=== In youth teams ===
- (Spain) José Ángel
- (Spain) José Aurelio
