= Oriol Ayala =

Spanish footballer

Personal information
- Full name: Oriol Ayala Serra
- Date of birth: 19 October 1996 (age 30)
- Place of birth: Girona, Spain
- Height: 1.90 m (6 ft 3 in)
- Position: Centre-back

Team information
- Current team: Olot
- Number: 6

Youth career
- 2003–2005: Gironès-Sàbat
- 2005–2010: Fornells
- 2010–2014: Girona
- 2014–2015: Real Madrid

Senior career*
Years	Team	Apps	(Gls)
2015–2017	Palamós	58	(0)
2017–2018	Llagostera	6	(1)
2018–2019	Reus B	36	(2)
2018	Reus	0	(0)
2019–2021	Figueres	45	(1)
2021–	Olot	127	(2)
- * Club domestic league appearances and goals as of 15 May 2026

Oriol Ayala Serra (born 19 October 1996) is a Spanish footballer who plays as a centre-back for Olot.

== Club career ==
Born in Girona, Catalonia, Ayala joined Real Madrid's La Fábrica in 2014, after stints at Girona FC, UE Fornells and CEF Gironès-Sàbat. On 7 July of the following year, after finishing his formation, he moved to Palamós CF in Tercera División.

Ayala made his senior debut during the 2015–16 campaign, being a regular starter. On 13 June 2017, he joined Segunda División B side UE Llagostera, but only featured rarely for the club.

In January 2018, Ayala signed for CF Reus Deportiu and was assigned to the reserves in the fourth division. He made his professional debut on 18 October, starting in a 1–3 away loss against UD Almería, for the season's Copa del Rey.

In July 2019, after Reus' severe economic problems, Ayala joined fellow fourth division side UE Figueres.

Ayala moved to Olot on 13 July 2021.
