= Naoki Goto =

Japanese footballer

Personal information
- Full name: Naoki Goto
- Date of birth: 26 April 2002 (age 24)
- Place of birth: Anan, Tokushima, Japan
- Height: 1.87 m (6 ft 2 in)
- Position: Goalkeeper

Team information
- Current team: YSCC Yokohama
- Number: 40

Youth career
- Iwawaki FC
- –2020: Tokushima Vortis

Senior career*
Years	Team	Apps	(Gls)
2021–2024	Tokushima Vortis	1	(0)
2022	→ Tochigi City (loan)	1	(0)
2024-	YSCC Yokohama	14	(0)
2025	Vanraure Hachinohe	0	(0)
- * Club domestic league appearances and goals as of 1 January 2026

Naoki Goto (後東 尚輝, Goto Naoki; born 26 April 2002) is a Japanese footballer currently playing as a goalkeeper for Tokushima Vortis.

== Early life ==
Naoki was born in Anan. He played youth football for Iwawaki FC and Tokushima Vortis.

== Career ==
Naoki is yet to make an appearance for Tokushima, though joined Tochigi City on loan in 2022. He was named on the bench twice during the 2022 season.

== Career statistics ==
=== Club ===
As of 23 February 2022.

Club	Season	League			National Cup		League Cup		Other		Total	
Club	Season	Division	Apps	Goals	Apps	Goals	Apps	Goals	Apps	Goals	Apps	Goals
Tokushima Vortis	2022	J2 League	0	0	0	0	1 (Note: Appearances in the J.League Cup)	0	0	0	1	0
Career total			0	0	0	0	1	0	0	0	1	0
