= Robert Costa (footballer) =

Spanish footballer

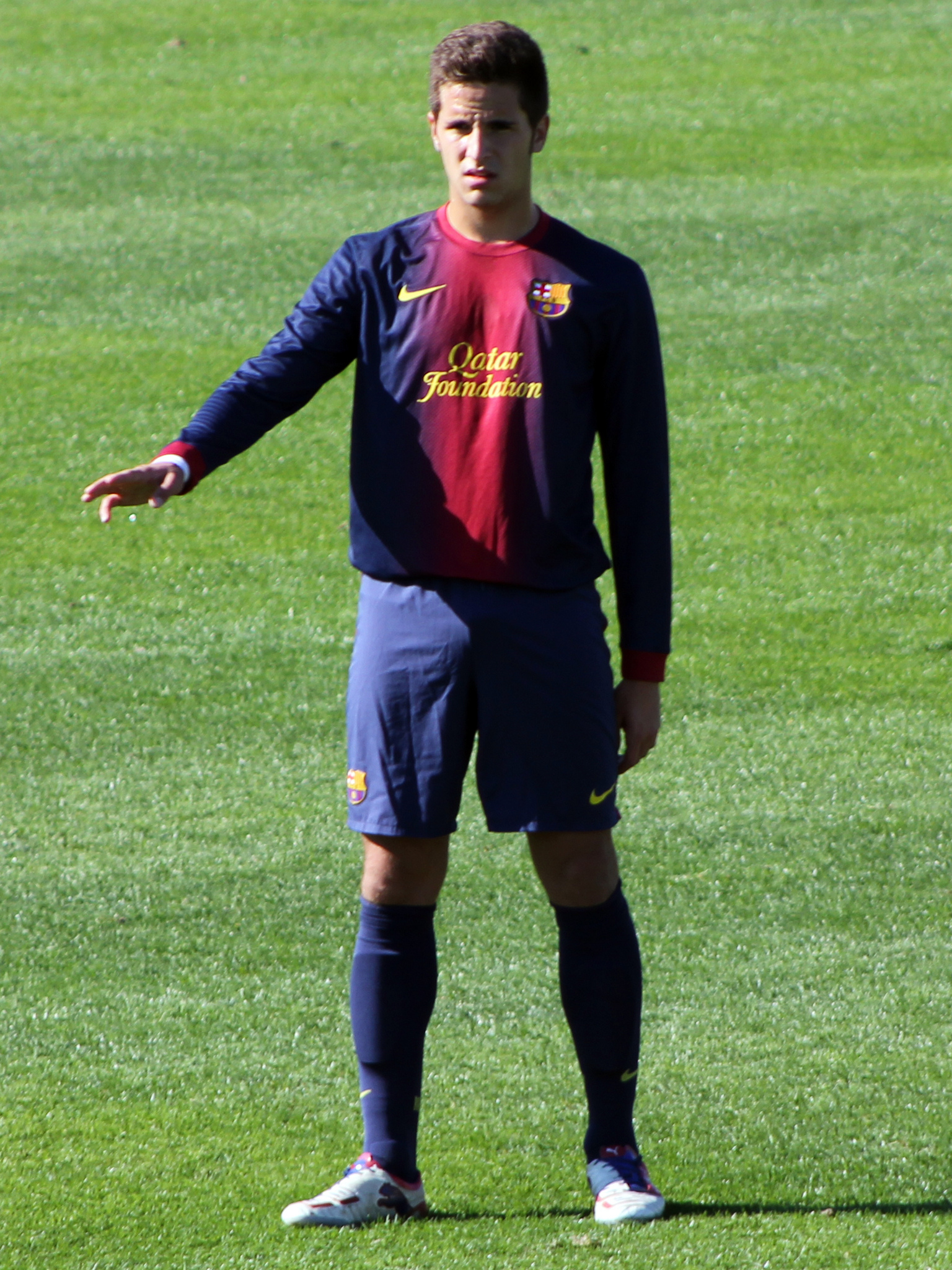
- Costa with Barcelona Juvenil in 2012

Personal information
- Full name: Robert Costa Ventura
- Date of birth: 6 June 1994 (age 32)
- Place of birth: Girona, Spain
- Height: 1.84 m (6 ft 0 in)
- Position: Centre back

Team information
- Current team: Olot
- Number: 22

Youth career
- Girona
- 2006–2013: Barcelona

Senior career*
| Years | Team | Apps | (Gls) |
| 2013–2016 | Barcelona B | 33 | (0) |
| 2013–2014 | → Badalona (loan) | 14 | (0) |
| 2016–2019 | Celta B | 50 | (0) |
| 2019–2020 | Levante B | 17 | (0) |
| 2020 | Lleida Esportiu | 0 | (0) |
| 2021 | Lorca Deportiva | 11 | (1) |
| 2021–2023 | Peña Deportiva | 53 | (0) |
| 2023–2024 | Alzira | 31 | (1) |
| 2024– | Olot | 48 | (0) |
- * Club domestic league appearances and goals as of 15 May 2026

Robert Costa Ventura (born 6 June 1994) is a Spanish footballer who plays for Olot as a central defender.

== Club career ==
Born in Girona, Catalonia, Costa joined FC Barcelona's youth system in 2006, aged 12. In June 2013 he was promoted to the reserves in Segunda División, but was loaned to CF Badalona in Segunda División B on 16 August.

Costa appeared in 14 matches during the 2013–14 campaign, and subsequently returned to Barça in June 2014. On 7 September, he played his first match as a professional, starting in a 4–1 home routing over Real Zaragoza.

== Career statistics ==
=== Club ===
As of match played 21 March 2021

Appearances and goals by club, season and competition
| Club | Season | League | | | National Cup | | Other | | Total | |
| Club | Season | Division | Apps | Goals | Apps | Goals | Apps | Goals | Apps | Goals |
|---|---|---|---|---|---|---|---|---|---|---|
| Barcelona B | 2012–13 | Segunda División | 0 | 0 | — | | — | | 0 | 0 |
| Barcelona B | 2014–15 | Segunda División | 13 | 0 | — | | — | | 13 | 0 |
| Barcelona B | 2015–16 | Segunda División B | 20 | 0 | — | | — | | 20 | 0 |
| Barcelona B | Total | | 33 | 0 | 0 | 0 | 0 | 0 | 33 | 0 |
| Badalona (loan) | 2013–14 | Segunda División B | 14 | 0 | 0 | 0 | — | | 14 | 0 |
| Celta B | 2016–17 | Segunda División B | 4 | 0 | — | | 1 (Note: Appearance(s) in Promotion Playoffs) | 0 | 5 | 0 |
| Celta B | 2017–18 | Segunda División B | 30 | 0 | — | | — | | 30 | 0 |
| Celta B | 2018–19 | Segunda División B | 16 | 0 | — | | 0 | 0 | 16 | 0 |
| Celta B | Total | | 50 | 0 | 0 | 0 | 1 | 0 | 51 | 0 |
| Levante B | 2019–20 | Segunda División B | 17 | 0 | — | | — | | 17 | 0 |
| Lorca Deportiva | 2020–21 | Segunda División B | 3 | 0 | 0 | 0 | — | | 3 | 0 |
| Career total | | | 117 | 0 | 0 | 0 | 1 | 0 | 118 | 0 |
