= CF Pobla de Mafumet =

Spanish association football club

Pobla Mafumet
- Full name: Club de Fútbol Pobla de Mafumet
- Founded: 1953; 73 years ago
- Ground: Estadi Municipal, La Pobla, Catalonia, Spain
- Capacity: 1,700
- President: Iván Carrasco Infante
- Head coach: Xavi Vilagut
- League: Tercera Federación – Group 5
- 2025–26: Lliga Elit, 3rd of 16 (promoted via play-offs)
- Website: www.cfpoblademafumet.cat
Home colours	Away colours

Club de Fútbol Pobla de Mafumet is a Spanish football club based in La Pobla de Mafumet, in the autonomous community of Catalonia. Founded in 1953, it plays in Tercera Federación – Group 5, holding home games at Estadi Municipal, which has a capacity of 1,700 spectators.

Since 2003, it has acted as a farm team for Gimnàstic de Tarragona.

== History ==
The club was founded in the late 1940s without any official status. The club participated in friendly games and regional tournaments as a part of the local celebrations. The club existed due to the efforts of such people as Francisco Mir, Josep Padrell, Joan and Josep Canela, Jaume Álvarez, Delfí Monné, Josep Vallbé, Lluís Bové, Francesc Gassull and Josep Foix. On June 24, 1953, the club was officially registered in the Catalan Football Federation.

== Season to season ==
=== As an independent club ===
Season	Tier	Division	Place	Copa del Rey
1964–65	6	2ª Reg.	8th	
1965–66	6	2ª Reg.	4th	
1966–67	6	2ª Reg.	14th	
1967–68	6	2ª Reg.	10th	
1968–69	6	2ª Reg.	6th	
1969–70	6	2ª Reg.	12th	
1970–71	6	2ª Reg.	16th	
1971–72	6	2ª Reg.	18th	
1972–73	6	2ª Reg.	7th	
1973–74	6	2ª Reg.	16th	
1974–75	6	2ª Reg.	11th	
1975–76	6	2ª Reg.	13th	
1976–77	6	2ª Reg.	19th	
1977–78	7	2ª Reg.	17th	
1978–79	7	2ª Reg.	19th	
1979–80	8	3ª Reg.		
1980–81	8	3ª Reg.	15th	
1981–82	8	3ª Reg.	18th	
1982–83	8	3ª Reg.	4th	
1983–84	8	3ª Reg.	2nd	

Season	Tier	Division	Place	Copa del Rey
1984–85	7	2ª Reg.	5th	
1985–86	7	2ª Reg.	8th	
1986–87	7	2ª Reg.	5th	
1987–88	7	2ª Reg.	1st	
1988–89	6	1ª Reg.	11th	
1989–90	6	1ª Reg.	17th	
1990–91	6	1ª Reg.	5th	
1991–92	7	1ª Terr.	2nd	
1992–93	7	1ª Terr.	1st	
1993–94	6	Pref. Terr.	5th	
1994–95	6	Pref. Terr.	14th	
1995–96	7	1ª Terr.	4th	
1996–97	7	1ª Terr.	3rd	
1997–98	7	1ª Terr.	1st	
1998–99	6	Pref. Terr.	2nd	
1999–2000	5	1ª Cat.	15th	
2000–01	5	1ª Cat.	20th	
2001–02	6	Pref. Terr.	7th	
2002–03	6	Pref. Terr.	2nd	

=== As a farm team ===
Season	Tier	Division	Place
2003–04	5	1ª Cat.	9th
2004–05	5	1ª Cat.	17th
2005–06	5	1ª Cat.	6th
2006–07	5	1ª Cat.	5th
2007–08	4	3ª	8th
2008–09	4	3ª	9th
2009–10	4	3ª	13th
2010–11	4	3ª	3rd
2011–12	4	3ª	4th
2012–13	4	3ª	8th
2013–14	4	3ª	8th
2014–15	4	3ª	2nd
2015–16	3	2ª B	17th
2016–17	4	3ª	7th
2017–18	4	3ª	6th
2018–19	4	3ª	14th
2019–20	4	3ª	6th
2020–21	4	3ª	7th / 1st
2021–22	5	3ª RFEF	7th
2022–23	5	3ª Fed.	7th

Season	Tier	Division	Place
2022–23	5	3ª Fed.	15th
2024–25	6	Lliga Elit	12th
2025–26	6	Lliga Elit	3rd
2026–27	5	3ª Fed.	

- 1 season in Segunda División B
- 13 seasons in Tercera División
- 4 seasons in Tercera Federación/Tercera División RFEF

== Current squad ==
As of 8 September 2026

Note: Flags indicate national team as defined under FIFA eligibility rules; some limited exceptions apply. Players may hold more than one non-FIFA nationality.

No.	Pos.	Nation	Player
1	GK	ESP	Gerard Curto
2	DF	ESP	Marc Moreno
3	DF	ESP	Rubén Martínez
4	DF	ESP	Xavi Samper
5	DF	ESP	Carles Sogorb
6	MF	ESP	Pau Raya
7	FW	ESP	Albert Querol
8	MF	ESP	Alex Beamuz
9	FW	ESP	Nico Aguzzi
10	MF	ESP	Manel Pavón
11	FW	ESP	Teo Pozo
12	DF	ESP	Guillem Barrés
13	GK	ESP	Nahuel Pérez
14	MF	ESP	Roger Ciuró
15	DF	ESP	Antonio Bioque
16	DF	ESP	Iker Adell

No.	Pos.	Nation	Player
17	FW	ESP	Joel Sánchez
18	FW	ESP	José Lledó
19	FW	ESP	Xabi Luaces
20	MF	ESP	Ubai Cardona
21	MF	ESP	Guillem Parisi
22	MF	ESP	Pol Cid
23	FW	ESP	Joan Martínez
24	FW	ESP	Pau Cifuentes
25	GK	ESP	Juanki Ferrando
26	DF	ESP	Eric Mora
27	FW	ESP	Joel Garrofé
28	DF	ESP	Genís Torrelles
29	MF	GHA	Enoch Akuffo
—	DF	ESP	Cristian Márquez
—	DF	ESP	Ruxi Anglès
—	MF	ESP	Rubén Maya

=== Reserve team ===
Note: Flags indicate national team as defined under FIFA eligibility rules; some limited exceptions apply. Players may hold more than one non-FIFA nationality.

No.	Pos.	Nation	Player
—	FW	ESP	Mor Diarra

== Notable players ==
For more information about players, see: CF Pobla de Mafumet footballers.

== Managers ==
- (Spain) Antonio Santamaría (1987–88)
- (Spain) Romà Cunillera (1992–93)
- (Spain) Santi Juncosa (1993–94)
- (Spain) Ángel García (1994–95)
- (Spain) Ramón Coch (1995–2000)
- (Spain) José Luis Guerra (2000–01)
- (Spain) Menchi (2001–02)
- (Spain) José Luis Guerra (2002–03)
- (Spain) Isaac Fernández (2003–04)
- (Spain) Flumencio Ruiz (2004–05)
- (Spain) Santi Coch (2005–10)
- (Spain) Kiko Ramírez (2010–12)
- (Spain) Iván Moreno (2012–14)
- (Argentina) Martín Posse (2014–17)
- (Spain) Rodri (2017)
- (Spain) Xisco Muñoz (interim) (2017)
- (Spain) Edu Vílchez (interim) (2017)
- (Spain) Juanma Pavón (2017–18)
- (Spain) Alberto Gallego (2018–19)
- (Spain) Beto Company (2019–20)
- (Spain) Dani Vidal (2020–21)
- (Spain) Adolfo Baines (2021–2024)
- (Spain) Àlex Accensi (2024)
- (Spain) Manel Cazorla (2024–25)
- (Spain) David Escandell (2025)
- (Spain) Xavi Vilagut (2025–)
