= Kaito Mori =

Japanese footballer

Kaito Mori 森 海渡
Personal information
- Date of birth: 7 June 2000 (age 26)
- Place of birth: Chiba, Japan
- Height: 1.85 m (6 ft 1 in)
- Position: Striker

Team information
- Current team: Montedio Yamagata
- Number: 39

Youth career
- Mutsumi SC
- –2018: Kashiwa Reysol

College career
Years	Team	Apps	(Gls)
2019–2021	University of Tsukuba		

Senior career*
Years	Team	Apps	(Gls)
2022–2024	Kashiwa Reysol	22	(5)
2023-2024	→ Tokushima Vortis (loan)	37	(13)
2024-2026	Yokohama FC	9	(0)
2025	→ JEF United Chiba (loan)	12	(0)
2026-	Montedio Yamagata	1	(0)

International career
2017	Japan U17	3	(0)
- * Club domestic league appearances and goals as of 13 August 2026

Kaito Mori (森 海渡, Mori Kaito; born 7 June 2000) is a Japanese footballer who plays as a striker for J2 League club Montedio Yamagata.

== Career statistics ==
=== Club ===
As of 28 February 2023.

Appearances and goals by club, season and competition
Club	Season	League			National Cup		League Cup		Other		Total	
Club	Season	Division	Apps	Goals	Apps	Goals	Apps	Goals	Apps	Goals	Apps	Goals
Japan			League		Emperor's Cup		J.League Cup		Other		Total	
University of Tsukuba	2020	–			4	2	–		–		4	2
Kashiwa Reysol	2022	J1 League	15	4	2	1	5	0	–		22	5
Tokushima Vortis (loan)	2023	J2 League	1	0	0	0	–		–		1	0
Career total			16	4	6	3	5	0	0	0	27	7
