= Jorge Romero (football manager) =

Spanish football manager (born 1984)

Personal information
- Full name: Jorge Romero Sáez
- Date of birth: 15 December 1984 (age 41)
- Place of birth: Córdoba, Spain

Managerial career
- Years: Team
- Don Bosco (youth)
- 2009–2012: Córdoba (youth)
- 2015–2016: Córdoba (assistant)
- 2016–2017: Córdoba B
- 2017–2018: Córdoba
- 2019–2020: Alcorcón B
- 2020–2021: Real Madrid (youth)
- 2021: Alcorcón B
- 2021: Alcorcón
- 2022–2023: UCAM Murcia

Jorge Romero Sáez (born 15 December 1984) is a Spanish football manager.

== Managerial career ==
Born in Córdoba, Andalusia, Romero joined Córdoba CF in 2009, from Don Bosco CF. Initially in charge of the youth setup, he was included in the first team staff during the 2012–13 season.

On 1 March 2017, Romero was appointed manager of the reserve team in Segunda División B. After avoiding relegation, he signed a new three-year contract with the club on 7 June.

On 4 December 2017, Romero replaced fired Juan Merino at the helm of the main squad in Segunda División. His first professional match occurred six days later, a 2–2 home draw against Rayo Vallecano.

On 12 February 2018, Romero was sacked following a 1–5 heavy loss against CD Tenerife. On 9 July 2019, after more than a year without coaching, he was appointed manager of AD Alcorcón's B-team in Tercera División.

In July 2020, Romero joined Real Madrid CF to become a coach of Real Madrid Juvenil A side. He returned to Alkor and its B-side on 19 July 2021, but was named at the helm of the main squad on 18 September after Juan Antonio Anquela was sacked.

On 2 November 2021, after only seven matches at the helm of the first team, Romero himself was dismissed as head coach.

== Managerial statistics ==
As of match played 26 March 2023

Managerial record by team and tenure
Team	From	To	Record								Ref
Team	From	To	G	W	D	L	GF	GA	GD	Win %	Ref
Córdoba B	1 March 2017	4 December 2017	28	10	10	8	39	31	+8	35.71	
Córdoba	4 December 2017	12 February 2018	9	2	1	6	12	16	−4	22.22	
Alcorcón B	9 July 2019	30 July 2020	30	13	12	5	44	28	+16	43.33	
Alcorcón B	20 July 2021	20 September 2021	4	0	3	1	3	6	−3	0.00	
Alcorcón	20 September 2021	2 November 2021	7	1	1	5	5	15	−10	14.29	
UCAM Murcia	4 October 2022	29 March 2023	22	8	11	3	31	20	+11	36.36	
Total			100	34	38	28	134	116	+18	34.00	—
