= Gimnàstic de Tarragona =

Association football club in Spain

- Full name: Club Gimnàstic de Tarragona S.A.D.
- Nicknames: Nàstic; Granes (Maroons); Nastiquers
- Founded: 1 March 1886; 140 years ago (gymnastic club); 1914; 112 years ago (football section)
- Ground: Nou Estadi Costa Daurada, Tarragona, Catalonia, Spain
- Capacity: 14,591
- President: Lluís Fàbregas
- Head coach: Xisco Campos
- League: Primera Federación – Group 2
- 2025–26: Primera Federación – Group 2, 14th of 20
- Website: gimnasticdetarragona.cat
Home colours	Away colours	Third colours

Club Gimnàstic de Tarragona, commonly known as Gimnàstic Tarragona or sometimes just Nàstic, is a Spanish sports club based in Tarragona, in the autonomous community of Catalonia. Its football team plays in Primera Federación – Group 2.

The club was founded in 1886 and is one of the oldest football clubs in Spain. It has teams competing in athletics, basketball, tennis, gymnastics, table tennis and futsal, but a football team was not formed until 1914. The team enjoyed a three-year La Liga spell in its beginnings (1947–50).

Since 1972, the team has played home games at Nou Estadi Costa Daurada, which seats 14,591 spectators.

== History ==
The club was founded on 1 March 1886 by a group of fifteen people who met at the Cafè del Centre on Rambla Nova. The majority of the club's early members belonged to the upper middle class and, as the club name suggests, was initially founded to promote gymnastics. Later the club members began to organise fencing, hiking, boxing and cycling. In 1914, the club absorbed a local football club called the Club Olímpic de Tarragona and consequently formed its own football team using the former colours of Olímpic: red, white and black. In those days the team played home matches in the Avenida Catalunya stadium.

In January 1918, Gimnàstic made its debut as a football team in the Campionat de Catalunya and by 1927 were crowned champions in the second division. In the 1943–44 season the team appeared in the Tercera División and in the following season moved up to the Segunda División.

In the 1946–47 season Nàstic finished second in the second division and entered the La Liga. In 1947 it also reached the Copa del Generalísimo semi-final but lost to the RCD Espanyol, having beaten the FC Barcelona in the previous round.

The team finished its debut first division season in seventh place, with the highlight of the season coming on 11 January 1948 with a 3–1 win against the Real Madrid at the Bernabéu, thus becoming the first team ever to do so. The club played two further seasons in the top level, being relegated in 1949–50 after losing a play-off to the CD Alcoyano. The team moved to the new Nou Estadi in 1972.

Fifty-six years later, for the 2006–07 season, Gimnàstic returned to the top flight. Along with coach Luis César Sampedro, some of the players responsible for the promotion included veterans Antonio Pinilla and Albano Bizarri. Rubén Castro, Ariza Makukula and Javier Portillo (eventually the team's top scorer) were also brought in. The club was placed in the relegation zone for 33 of the 38 rounds, eventually dropping down a division. Sampedro was replaced mid-season by Paco Flores who improved the team's numbers. In the middle of 2007 the club was crowned the Copa Catalunya champions after a 2–1 win over FC Barcelona, with goals from Pinilla and Tati Maldonado.

After returning to the second level Gimnàstic achieved a mid-table position in 2007–08 and 2008–09 with César Ferrando in charge of the team. However, in the 2009–10 and 2010–11 seasons, the club only managed to rank one position above the relegation zone. In the 2011–12 campaign the team was relegated to the Segunda División B after only winning six games out of 42.

On 12 September 2012 Nàstic won the second Catalan Cup in its history, after defeating the AEC Manlleu with an Eugeni goal. In the 2014–15 campaign, after finishing first in its group, the club returned to the second level after defeating the SD Huesca in the play-offs.

In the 2018–19 campaign the team was relegated to the Segunda División B ending a four-year run in the second division.

== Supporters ==
There are two ultras groups: Orgull Grana 1886, a catalanist ultra group that has expressed political solidarity with the palestinian cause, and Alterats 1886, an antifa ultra group with active presence and sometimes involved in fights with right wing ultras.

There are also two supporters' groups that don't identify themselves as ultras: Furia Grana and Tarraco Firm Supporters.

== Seasons ==
=== Season to season ===
Season	Tier	Division	Place	Copa del Rey
1939–40	6	2ª Reg. P.	1st	
1940–41	4	1ª Reg. A	10th	
1941–42	4	1ª Reg. B	3rd	
1942–43	3	1ª Reg. A	2nd	
1943–44	3	3ª	2nd	
1944–45	3	3ª	1st	
1945–46	2	2ª	3rd	Round of 16
1946–47	2	2ª	2nd	Semi-finals
1947–48	1	1ª	7th	Round of 16
1948–49	1	1ª	9th	Quarter-finals
1949–50	1	1ª	13th	
1950–51	2	2ª	15th	
1951–52	2	2ª	13th	
1952–53	2	2ª	14th	First round
1953–54	3	3ª	10th	
1954–55	3	3ª	1st	
1955–56	3	3ª	4th	
1956–57	3	3ª	6th	
1957–58	3	3ª	8th	
1958–59	3	3ª	2nd	

Season	Tier	Division	Place	Copa del Rey
1959–60	3	3ª	9th	
1960–61	3	3ª	1st	
1961–62	3	3ª	3rd	
1962–63	3	3ª	6th	
1963–64	3	3ª	3rd	
1964–65	3	3ª	3rd	
1965–66	3	3ª	1st	
1966–67	3	3ª	2nd	
1967–68	3	3ª	3rd	
1968–69	3	3ª	2nd	
1969–70	3	3ª	7th	
1970–71	3	3ª	13th	First round
1971–72	3	3ª	1st	
1972–73	2	2ª	16th	Fourth round
1973–74	2	2ª	6th	Fourth round
1974–75	2	2ª	13th	Round of 32
1975–76	2	2ª	20th	Third round
1976–77	3	3ª	11th	Second round
1977–78	4	3ª	1st	Second round
1978–79	3	2ª B	2nd	

Season	Tier	Division	Place	Copa del Rey
1979–80	2	2ª	19th	Fourth round
1980–81	3	2ª B	9th	First round
1981–82	3	2ª B	11th	Second round
1982–83	3	2ª B	5th	
1983–84	3	2ª B	5th	Second round
1984–85	3	2ª B	13th	First round
1985–86	3	2ª B	14th	
1986–87	4	3ª	4th	
1987–88	3	2ª B	8th	Second round
1988–89	3	2ª B	9th	First round
1989–90	3	2ª B	17th	
1990–91	4	3ª	2nd	
1991–92	3	2ª B	9th	Third round
1992–93	3	2ª B	10th	First round
1993–94	3	2ª B	11th	First round
1994–95	3	2ª B	16th	Third round
1995–96	3	2ª B	2nd	
1996–97	3	2ª B	1st	First round
1997–98	3	2ª B	15th	First round
1998–99	3	2ª B	16th	

Season	Tier	Division	Place	Copa del Rey
1999–2000	3	2ª B	9th	
2000–01	3	2ª B	2nd	
2001–02	2	2ª	20th	Round of 16
2002–03	3	2ª B	9th	Round of 64
2003–04	3	2ª B	3rd	
2004–05	2	2ª	7th	Third round
2005–06	2	2ª	2nd	Third round
2006–07	1	1ª	20th	Round of 32
2007–08	2	2ª	14th	Second round
2008–09	2	2ª	10th	Second round
2009–10	2	2ª	18th	Second round
2010–11	2	2ª	18th	Second round
2011–12	2	2ª	22nd	Second round
2012–13	3	2ª B	6th	First round
2013–14	3	2ª B	4th	Round of 32
2014–15	3	2ª B	1st	Second round
2015–16	2	2ª	3rd	Third round
2016–17	2	2ª	14th	Round of 32
2017–18	2	2ª	15th	Second round
2018–19	2	2ª	20th	First round

Season	Tier	Division	Place	Copa del Rey
2019–20	3	2ª B	14th	Second round
2020–21	3	2ª B	1st / 4th	
2021–22	3	1ª RFEF	4th	First round
2022–23	3	1ª Fed.	8th	Round of 32
2023–24	3	1ª Fed.	2nd	First round
2024–25	3	1ª Fed.	5th	Second round
2025–26	3	1ª Fed.	14th	First round
2026–27	3	1ª Fed.		

- 4 seasons in La Liga
- 22 seasons in Segunda División
- 6 seasons in Primera Federación/Primera División RFEF
- 28 seasons in Segunda División B
- 25 seasons in Tercera División
- 4 seasons in Categorías Regionales

== Players ==
=== Current squad ===
As of 8 September 2026

Note: Flags indicate national team as defined under FIFA eligibility rules; some limited exceptions apply. Players may hold more than one non-FIFA nationality.

No.	Pos.	Nation	Player
1	GK	ESP	Gaizka Ayesa
2	DF	ESP	Oriol Subirats
3	DF	ESP	Víctor Villote (on loan from Las Palmas)
4	DF	ESP	Fran Gil
5	DF	NED	Nico Van Rijn
6	MF	ESP	Toni Gabarri
7	FW	ESP	Borja Sánchez
8	MF	ESP	Marc Montalvo (vice-captain)
9	FW	ESP	Pere Marco
10	MF	ESP	Eugeni Valderrama (3rd captain)
11	FW	ESP	Diego Gómez
12	FW	TUR	Sinan Bakış

No.	Pos.	Nation	Player
13	GK	ESP	Vicent Abril (on loan from Valencia)
14	MF	ESP	Aitor Gelardo
15	DF	ESP	José Amo (4th captain)
16	MF	GAB	Meshak Babanzila
17	FW	ESP	Alex Almansa
18	MF	JPN	Shinnosuke Katsushima
19	FW	ESP	Joan Prohens
20	FW	ESP	Carlos Segura
21	DF	KEN	Ismael Athuman
22	DF	ESP	Joseda Menargues
23	DF	ESP	Manel Royo (captain)
24	FW	ESP	Darío Ramírez

=== Reserve team ===
Note: Flags indicate national team as defined under FIFA eligibility rules; some limited exceptions apply. Players may hold more than one non-FIFA nationality.

No. / Pos. / Nation / Player; 27 / DF / ESP / Guillem Barrés	No. / Pos. / Nation / Player; 30 / FW / ESP / Pau Cifuentes

=== Out on loan ===
Note: Flags indicate national team as defined under FIFA eligibility rules; some limited exceptions apply. Players may hold more than one non-FIFA nationality.

No.	Pos.	Nation	Player
—	FW	ESP	Marc Álvarez (at Castellonense until 30 June 2027)
—	FW	ESP	Airan Ruvira (at Atlètic Lleida until 30 June 2027)

=== Current technical staff ===
Position	Staff
Head coach	Xisco Campos
Assistant manager	Álex Garcia
Goalkeeper coach	Manolo Oliva
Fitness coach	Javi Espí
Analyst	Yuriy Storozhuk; Octavi Potau
Doctor	Carles Hernández
Physio	Albert Samper; Víctor Rodríguez; Daniel Briones
Readapter	Sergi Salvadó
Nutritionist	Pau Balart
Match delegate	Xavi Roch
Kit man	Oscar Lara

Last updated: 29 August 2026
Source: Gimnàstic

== Notable players ==
Players who appeared in more than 100 league matches for the club and/or reached international status.

- (Algeria) Liassine Cadamuro
- (Andorra) Marc Bernaus
- (Andorra) (Spain) Justo Ruiz
- (Bolivia) Samuel Galindo
- (Brazil) Gil
- (Cameroon) Mohammed Djetei
- (Cameroon) Achille Emaná
- (Cameroon) Fabrice Ondoa
- (Chile) Juan Delgado
- (Gabon) Lévy Madinda
- (Georgia (country)) Giorgi Aburjania
- (Georgia (country)) Oto Kakabadze
- (Ghana) Mohammed Rabiu
- (Ivory Coast) Jean Luc
- (Japan) Daisuke Suzuki
- (North Macedonia) Stole Dimitrievski
- (Nigeria) Abdulrazak Ekpoki
- (Nigeria) Ike Uche
- (Paraguay) Julio Cáceres
- (Portugal) Ariza Makukula
- (Senegal) Papakouli Diop
- (Spain) Jordi Alba
- (Spain) Ángel
- (Spain) Rafael Arumí
- (Spain) Ismael Bañeras
- (Spain) Abel Buades
- (Spain) Alejandro Campano
- (Spain) Andrés Català
- (Spain) Santi Castillejo
- (Spain) Lluis Codina
- (Spain) Santi Coch
- (Spain) Ángel Cuéllar
- (Spain) Román Cunillera
- (Spain) Curro Torres
- (Spain) David Medina
- (Spain) Eloy Pérez
- (Spain) Felip Font
- (Spain) Jordi Gálvez
- (Spain) José Antonio Gordillo
- (Spain) Jordi Grabulosa
- (Spain) José Mari
- (Spain) Juanmi
- (Spain) Pedro Mairata
- (Spain) Manolo Herrero
- (Spain) Manolo Martínez
- (Spain) Manu del Moral
- (Spain) Marcos de la Espada
- (Spain) Ramón Masqué
- (Spain) Menchi
- (Spain) Xavi Molina
- (Spain) Jordi Masnou
- (Spain) Mingo
- (Spain) Xavi Molina
- (Spain) Fernando Morán
- (Spain) Mossa
- (Spain) José Antonio Naranjo
- (Spain) Ángel Oribe
- (Spain) Joan Pallarès
- (Spain) Manuel Parejo
- (Spain) Sergi Parés
- (Spain) Santi Palanca
- (Spain) Paulino
- (Spain) Alfonso Perdomo
- (Spain) Antonio Pinilla
- (Spain) Félix Prieto
- (Spain) Quique Estévez
- (Spain) Kiko Ramírez
- (Spain) Manolo Reina
- (Spain) Pedro Robles
- (Spain) David Rocha
- (Spain) Camilo Roig
- (Spain) Rubén Pérez
- (Spain) José Manuel Rubio
- (Spain) Valero Serer
- (Spain) Txus Serrano
- (Spain) Antonio Torres
- (Spain) Diego Torres
- (Spain) Xisco Campos
- (Spain) Juan Vizcaíno
- (Sweden) Tobias Grahn
- (Uruguay) Adrián Luna
- (Venezuela) Miku

=== Player records ===
- Most appearances - 528, Santi Coch
- Most goals - 181, Valero Serer

== Honours ==
=== National ===
- Segunda División B: 1996–97
- Segunda División B League Cup: 1983–84
- Tercera División: 1944–45, 1954–55, 1960–61, 1965–66, 1966–67, 1971–72, 1977–78
- Copa de la Liga: 1983–84 Segunda División B – Group I

=== Regional ===
- Copa Catalunya: 2007–08, 2011–12, 2016–17
- Catalan Cup Second Division: 1926–27

== Affiliated clubs ==
- (Spain) CF Pobla de Mafumet
- (Hong Kong) Kitchee SC
- (Honduras) C.D. Olimpia
- (El Salvador) Fuerte San Francisco

== See also ==
- Ciutat de Tarragona Trophy
