= 2015–16 Girona FC season =

Girona FC
2015–16 season
- Chairman: Delfí Geli
- Manager: Pablo Machín
- Stadium: Montilivi
- Segunda División: 4th
- Copa del Rey: Second round
- Top goalscorer: League: Jaime Mata (9); All: Jaime Mata (9)
- Biggest win: 4–0 vs Ponferradina
Home colours	Away colours

The 2015–16 Girona FC season was the club's 86th season in existence and the eighth consecutive season in the second division of Spanish football. In addition to the domestic league, Girona participated in this season's edition of the Copa del Rey. The season covered the period from 1 July 2015 to 30 June 2016.

== Players ==
=== First-team squad ===
Note: Flags indicate national team as defined under FIFA eligibility rules; some limited exceptions apply. Players may hold more than one non-FIFA nationality.

No.	Pos.	Nation	Player
1	GK	ESP	Germán Parreño (on loan from Espanyol)
2	FW	ESP	Sebas Coris
3	DF	ESP	Carles Mas
4	DF	FRA	Florian Lejeune (on loan from Manchester City)
5	DF	ESP	Pedro Alcalá
6	MF	ESP	Álex Granell
7	DF	ESP	Richy
8	MF	ESP	Pere Pons
9	FW	ESP	Jaime Mata
10	MF	ESP	Eloi Amagat
11	MF	ESP	Aday Benítez
13	GK	ESP	Isaac Becerra
14	MF	ESP	Rubén Alcaraz

No.	Pos.	Nation	Player
15	DF	ESP	Pablo Maffeo (on loan from Manchester City)
16	FW	ESP	Cristian Herrera
17	DF	ESP	Carlos Clerc (on loan from Espanyol)
18	FW	ESP	Jairo Morillas (on loan from Espanyol)
19	MF	ESP	Felipe Sanchón
20	FW	ESP	Rubén Sobrino (on loan from Manchester City)
21	MF	ESP	Pol Llonch
22	DF	ESP	Kiko Olivas
23	MF	ESP	Javi Álamo (on loan from Zaragoza)
24	MF	ESP	Borja García
25	FW	SRB	Dejan Lekić
30	GK	ESP	David Oliveros

=== Youth players ===
Note: Flags indicate national team as defined under FIFA eligibility rules; some limited exceptions apply. Players may hold more than one non-FIFA nationality.

No.	Pos.	Nation	Player
35	FW	ESP	Joel Arimany
—	DF	URU	Diego Caballero

=== Out on loan ===
Note: Flags indicate national team as defined under FIFA eligibility rules; some limited exceptions apply. Players may hold more than one non-FIFA nationality.

No.	Pos.	Nation	Player
—	DF	ESP	David Bigas (on loan at Olot)
—	MF	MAR	Ayub (on loan at Marbella)
—	MF	CIV	Djakaridja Traoré (on loan at Olot)

No.	Pos.	Nation	Player
—	MF	ESP	Albert Vivancos (on loan at Hércules)
—	MF	ESP	David Serrano (on loan at Badalona)

== Transfers ==
=== In ===
Date	Name	Moving from	Fee
17 June 2015	(Spain) Rubén Alcaraz	(Spain) CE L'Hospitalet	Free
11 July 2015	(Spain) Marcelo Djaló	(Italy) Juventus FC	Loan
15 July 2015	(Spain) Carlos Clerc	(Spain) RCD Espanyol	Loan
20 July 2015	(Spain) David Oliveros	(Spain) Real Madrid Juvenil	Free
24 July 2015	(Spain) Kiko Olivas	(Spain) CE Sabadell FC	Free
29 July 2015	(Spain) Jairo Morillas	(Spain) RCD Espanyol	Loan

=== Out ===
Date	Name	Moving to	Fee
17 June 2015	(Spain) Gerard Bordas	Unattached	Free
17 June 2015	(Spain) Juanlu Hens	Unattached	Free
17 June 2015	(Spain) David García	Unattached	Free
11 July 2015	(Spain) Marc Rovirola	(Spain) UE Llagostera	Free
13 July 2015	(Spain) Ayub El Harrak	(Spain) Marbella FC	Loan
28 July 2015	(Spain) David Juncà	(Spain) SD Eibar	Free

== Pre-season and friendlies ==
Win Draw Loss Fixtures

== Competitions ==
=== Overview ===
Competition	First match	Last match	Starting round	Final position	Record							
Competition	First match	Last match	Starting round	Final position	Pld	W	D	L	GF	GA	GD	Win %
Segunda División	24 August 2015	4 June 2016	Matchday 1	4th	42	17	15	10	46	28	+18	40.48
Segunda División promotion play-offs	9 June 2016	18 June 2016	Semi-finals	Runners-up	4	1	0	3	5	6	−1	25.00
Copa del Rey	9 September 2015		Second round	Second round	1	0	1	0	2	2	+0	0.00
Total					47	18	16	13	53	36	+17	38.30

Last updated: 18 June 2016
Source: Soccerway

=== Segunda División ===
==== League table ====
Pos	Team	Pld	W	D	L	GF	GA	GD	Pts	Promotion, qualification or relegation
2	Leganés (P)	42	20	14	8	59	34	+25	74	Promotion to La Liga
3	Gimnàstic	42	18	17	7	57	41	+16	71	Qualification to promotion play-offs
4	Girona	42	17	15	10	46	28	+18	66	Qualification to promotion play-offs
5	Córdoba	42	19	8	15	59	52	+7	65	Qualification to promotion play-offs
6	Osasuna (O, P)	42	17	13	12	47	40	+7	64 (Note: Osasuna ahead of Alcorcón and Zaragoza on head-to-head record; Osasuna 7 points, Alcorcón 6 points, Zaragoza 4 points)	Qualification to promotion play-offs

Source: LFP
Rules for classification: 1) points; 2) head-to-head points; 3) head-to-head goal difference; 4) goal difference; 5) number of goals scored
(O) Play-off winners; (P) Promoted

==== Results summary ====
Overall								Home						Away					
Pld	W	D	L	GF	GA	GD	Pts	W	D	L	GF	GA	GD	W	D	L	GF	GA	GD
42	17	15	10	46	28	+18	66	9	8	4	26	14	+12	8	7	6	20	14	+6

Last updated: 4 June 2016.
Source: Liga Adelante

==== Results by round ====
Round	1	2	3	4	5	6	7	8	9	10	11	12	13	14	15	16	17	18	19	20	21	22	23	24	25	26	27	28	29	30	31	32	33	34	35	36	37	38	39	40	41	42
Ground	A	H	A	H	A	H	A	H	A	H	A	H	A	H	A	H	H	A	H	A	H	H	A	H	A	H	A	H	A	H	A	H	A	H	A	H	A	A	H	A	H	A
Result	W	L	L	D	W	D	L	D	D	D	W	L	L	W	D	L	L	D	W	L	W	W	D	D	W	D	W	W	L	D	W	D	D	W	W	W	L	D	W	D	W	W
Position	8	11	15	17	10	12	17	17	16	18	14	16	18	14	15	16	18	17	15	17	16	14	13	13	14	14	12	9	12	12	11	11	12	10	8	7	7	8	6	8	6	4

Updated to match(es) played on 4 June 2016. Source: Liga Adelante
A = Away; H = Home; W = Win; D = Draw; L = Loss

==== Matches ====
The fixtures were revealed on 14 July 2015.

24 August 2015 1	Bilbao Athletic	0–1	Girona	Bilbao
21:00 CEST (UTC+2)		Report		Stadium: San Mamés; Referee: Guillermo Cuadra Fernández

29 August 2015 2	Girona	2–3	Numancia	Girona
20:30 CEST (UTC+2)		Report		Stadium: Montilivi; Referee: Adrián Cordero Vega

5 September 2015 3	Gimnàstic	1–0	Girona	Tarragona
18:00 CEST (UTC+2)		Report		Stadium: Nou Estadi; Referee: José Ramón Piñeiro Crespo

13 September 2015 4	Girona	0–0	Huesca	Girona
12:00		Report		Stadium: Montilivi; Referee: David Pérez Pallas

19 September 2015 5	Oviedo	1–2	Girona	Oviedo
16:00 CEST (UTC+2)		Report		Stadium: Carlos Tartiere; Referee: Dámaso Arcediano Monescillo

27 September 2016 6	Girona	2–2	Llagostera	Girona
17:00 CEST (UTC+2)		Report		Stadium: Montilivi; Referee: Gorka Sagués Oscoz

4 October 2015 7	Mirandés	1–0	Girona	Miranda de Ebro
17:00 CEST (UTC+2)		Report		Stadium: Anduva; Referee: Rubén Ruipérez Marín

11 October 2015 8	Girona	1–1	Almería	Girona
19:15		Report		Stadium: Montilivi; Referee: Óliver de la Fuente Ramos

17 October 2015 9	Leganés	2–2	Girona	Leganés
18:00 CEST (UTC+2)		Report		Stadium: Butarque; Referee: Saúl Ais Reig

24 October 2015 10	Girona	0–0	Zaragoza	Girona
20:15		Report		Stadium: Montilivi; Referee: Daniel Jesús Trujillo Suárez

1 November 2015 11	Osasuna	0–1	Girona	Pamplona
17:00 CEST (UTC+2)		Report		Stadium: El Sadar; Referee: Jorge Valdés Aller

8 November 2015 12	Girona	0–1	Lugo	Girona
17:00 CEST (UTC+2)		Report		Stadium: Montilivi; Referee: Pablo González Fuertes

14 November 2015 13	Alavés	1–0	Girona	Vitoria-Gasteiz
18:00 CEST (UTC+2)		Report		Stadium: Mendizorrotza; Referee: Víctor Areces Franco

22 November 2015 14	Girona	3–0	Albacete	Girona
17:00 CEST (UTC+2)		Report		Stadium: Montilivi; Referee: Daniel Ocón Arráiz

29 November 2015 15	Tenerife	1–1	Girona	Santa Cruz de Tenerife
17:00 CEST (UTC+2)		Report		Stadium: Heliodoro Rodríguez López; Referee: Juan Manuel López Amaya

6 December 2015 16	Girona	1–2	Córdoba	Girona
19:15		Report		Stadium: Montilivi; Referee: Valentín Pizarro Gómez

12 December 2015 17	Girona	0–1	Elche	Girona
18:00 CEST (UTC+2)		Report		Stadium: Montilivi; Referee: José Luis Munuera Montero

19 December 2015 18	Mallorca	1–1	Girona	Palma
18:00 CEST (UTC+2)		Report		Stadium: Iberostar; Referee: Pablo González Fuertes

4 January 2016 19	Girona	1–0	Valladolid	Girona
20:30 CEST (UTC+2)		Report		Stadium: Montilivi; Referee: Rubén Ruipérez Marín

9 January 2016 20	Alcorcón	1–0	Girona	Alcorcón
18:00 CEST (UTC+2)		Report		Stadium: Santo Domingo; Referee: Adrián Cordero Vega

17 January 2016 21	Girona	4–0	Ponferradina	Girona
17:00 CEST (UTC+2)		Report		Stadium: Montilivi; Referee: Javier Alberola Rojas

23 January 2016 22	Girona	2–1	Bilbao Athletic	Girona
18:00 CEST (UTC+2)		Report		Stadium: Montilivi; Referee: Jorge Valdés Aller

31 January 2016 23	Numancia	1–1	Girona	Soria
17:00 CEST (UTC+2)		Report		Stadium: Los Pajaritos; Referee: Francisco Manuel Arias López

7 February 2016 24	Girona	1–1	Gimnàstic	Girona
17:00 CEST (UTC+2)		Report		Stadium: Montilivi; Referee: Jorge Figueroa Vázquez

14 February 2016 25	Huesca	0–1	Girona	Huesca
17:00 CEST (UTC+2)		Report		Stadium: El Alcoraz; Referee: Daniel Jesús Trujillo Suárez

21 February 2016 26	Girona	1–1	Oviedo	Girona
17:00 CEST (UTC+2)		Report		Stadium: Montilivi; Referee: Saúl Ais Reig

27 February 2016 27	Llagostera	0–1	Girona	Llagostera
18:00 CEST (UTC+2)		Report		Stadium: Palamós Costa Brava; Referee: José Luis Munuera Montero

5 March 2016 28	Girona	2–0	Mirandés	Girona
18:00 CEST (UTC+2)		Report		Stadium: Montilivi; Referee: Víctor Areces Franco

12 March 2016 29	Almería	1–0	Girona	Almería
18:00 CEST (UTC+2)		Report		Stadium: Juegos Mediterráneos; Referee: Óliver de la Fuente Ramos

20 March 2016 30	Girona	1–1	Leganés	Girona
17:00 CEST (UTC+2)		Report		Stadium: Montilivi; Referee: Guillermo Cuadra Fernández

27 March 2016 31	Zaragoza	0–3	Girona	Zaragoza
17:00 CEST (UTC+2)		Report		Stadium: La Romareda; Referee: Daniel Ocón Arráiz

3 April 2016 32	Girona	0–0	Osasuna	Girona
17:00 CEST (UTC+2)		Report		Stadium: Montilivi; Referee: José Ramón Piñeiro Crespo

9 April 2016 33	Lugo	1–1	Girona	Lugo
18:00 CEST (UTC+2)		Report		Stadium: Anxo Carro; Referee: Jorge Figueroa Vázquez

16 April 2016 34	Girona	1–0	Alavés	Girona
18:00 CEST (UTC+2)		Report		Stadium: Montilivi; Referee: Guillermo Cuadra Fernández

23 April 2016 35	Albacete	0–3	Girona	Albacete
18:00 CEST (UTC+2)		Report		Stadium: Carlos Belmonte; Referee: Gorka Sagués Oscoz

1 May 2016 36	Girona	1–0	Tenerife	Girona
17:00 CEST (UTC+2)		Report		Stadium: Montilivi; Referee: Víctor Areces Franco

8 May 2016 37	Córdoba	1–0	Girona	Córdoba
20:00 CEST (UTC+2)		Report		Stadium: El Arcángel; Referee: Valentín Pizarro Gómez

15 May 2016 38	Elche	1–1	Girona	Elche
17:00 CEST (UTC+2)		Report		Stadium: Martínez Valero; Referee: Rubén Eiriz Mata

21 May 2016 39	Girona	1–0	Mallorca	Girona
18:00 CEST (UTC+2)		Report		Stadium: Montilivi; Referee: Adrián Cordero Vega

24 May 2016 40	Valladolid	0–0	Girona	Valladolid
20:30 CEST (UTC+2)		Report		Stadium: José Zorrilla; Referee: Rubén Ruipérez Marín

29 May 2016 41	Girona	2–0	Alcorcón	Girona
20:00 CEST (UTC+2)		Report		Stadium: Montilivi; Referee: Jorge Valdés Aller

4 June 2016 42	Ponferradina	0–1	Girona	Ponferrada
20:30 CEST (UTC+2)		Report		Stadium: El Toralín; Referee: Gorka Sagués Oscoz

==== Play-offs ====
9 June 2016 SF First leg	Córdoba	2–1	Girona	Córdoba
20:00		Report		Stadium: El Arcángel

12 June 2016 SF Second leg	Girona	3–1 (4–3 agg.)	Córdoba	Girona
19:00		Report		Stadium: Montilivi

15 June 2016 F First leg	Osasuna	2–1	Girona	Pamplona
20:00		Report		Stadium: El Sadar

18 June 2016 F Second leg	Girona	0–1 (1–3 agg.)	Osasuna	Girona
19:00		Report		Stadium: Montilivi

=== Copa del Rey ===
9 September 2015 Second round	Gimnàstic	2–2 (a.e.t.) (5–4 p)	Girona	Tarragona
		Report		Stadium: Nou Estadi

== Statistics ==
=== Goalscorers ===
As of 18 June 2016

Rank	No.	Pos	Nat	Name	Segunda División	Copa del Rey	Total
		FW		[[]]			
Totals							
