= 2014–15 Girona FC season =

Girona
2014–15 season
- President: Francesc Rebled
- Manager: Pablo Machín
- Stadium: Montilivi
- Segunda División: 3rd
- Copa del Rey: Third round
Home colours	Away colours

The 2014–15 Girona FC season is the 84th season in the club history.

== Current squad ==
Note: Flags indicate national team as defined under FIFA eligibility rules; some limited exceptions apply. Players may hold more than one non-FIFA nationality.

No.	Pos.	Nation	Player
1	GK	ESP	Jorge Palatsí
3	DF	ESP	David García
4	DF	FRA	Florian Lejeune
5	MF	ESP	Cristian Gómez (on loan from Espanyol)
6	MF	ESP	Álex Granell
7	DF	ESP	Richy
8	MF	ESP	Eloi Amagat
9	FW	ESP	Jaime Mata
10	FW	ESP	Gerard Bordas
11	MF	ESP	Aday Benítez
13	GK	ESP	Isaac Becerra
14	DF	ESP	Pablo Íñiguez (on loan from Villarreal)
16	MF	ESP	Christian Alfonso (on loan from Espanyol)

No.	Pos.	Nation	Player
17	MF	ESP	Juanlu Hens
19	MF	ESP	Felipe Sanchón
20	MF	ESP	Jandro
21	FW	ESP	Francisco Sandaza
22	DF	ESP	Miguel Ángel Garrido (on loan from Elche)
23	DF	ESP	David Juncà
24	DF	ESP	Jonás Ramalho (on loan from Athletic Bilbao)
26	MF	ESP	Albert Vivancos
27	MF	ESP	Marc Serramitja
28	DF	ESP	Carles Mas
29	MF	ESP	Pere Pons
32	FW	ESP	Sebas Coris
33	DF	ESP	David Bigas

== Players and staff ==
=== Squad information ===
As of 15 February 2015

Number	Position	Nat	Name	Age	EU	Since	App	Goals	Ends	Transfer fee	Notes
1	GK	(Spain)	Palatsí	37	EU	2013	2	0	2015	Free
3	LB	(Spain)	Garciá	44	EU	2011	10	0	2015	Free
4	CB	(France)	Lejeune	34	EU	2014	24	1	2016	Free
5	CM	(Spain)	Gómez	36	EU	2014	8	0	2015	Loan
6	CM	(Spain)	Granell	37	EU	2014	26	2	2016	Free
7	CB	(Spain)	Richy	41	EU	2011	26	2	2015	Free
8	AM	(Spain)	Eloi	40	EU	2012	14	0	2016	?
9	CF	(Spain)	Mata	37	EU	2014	21	4	2016	Free
10	LW	(Spain)	Bordas	44	EU	2013	5	1	2015	Free
11	LM	(Spain)	Aday	37	EU	2014	16	1	2016	Free
13	GK	(Spain)	Becerra	37	EU	2012	22	0	2016	Free
14	CB	(Spain)	P. Íñiguez	31	EU	2014	6	0	2015	Loan
16	CM	(Spain)	C. Alfonso	36	EU	2014	9	0	2015	Loan
17	RM	(Spain)	Juanlu	41	EU	2011	116	6	2015	?
19	CF	(Spain)	Sanchón	43	EU	2012	105	33	2016	Free
20	AM	(Spain)	Jandro	46	EU	2010	162	37	2015	?
21	CF	(Spain)	Sandaza	40	EU	2014	17	7	2015	Free
22	RB	(Spain)	Garrido	35	EU	2014	18	0	2015	Loan
23	LB	(Spain)	Juncà	31	EU	2012	57	3	2016	Youth system
24	CB	(Spain)	Ramalho	32	EU	2014	16	0	2015	Loan
28	CB	(Spain)	Mas	32	EU	2013	17	0	2015	Youth system
29	CM	(Spain)	Pons	32	EU	2013	40	1	2017	Loan return
30	GK	(Spain)	Andés	32	EU	2014	0	0	2015	Youth system
32	SS	(Spain)	Coris	32	EU	2013	12	0		Youth system
33	RB	(Spain)	Bigas	31	EU	2014	2	0		Youth system

=== Transfer in ===
Number	Position	Nat	Name	Age	EU	Moving from	Type	Transfer window	Ends	Transfer fee	Source
16	CM	(Spain)	C. Alfonso	36	EU	RCD Espanyol	On loan	Summer	2015	Loan
14	CB	(Spain)	Íñiguez	31	EU	Villarreal CF	On loan	Summer	2015	Loan
5	CM	(Spain)	C. Gómez	36	EU	RCD Espanyol	On loan	Summer	2016	Loan
21	CF	(Spain)	Sandaza	36	EU	CD Lugo	Transfer	Summer	2015	Free
11	LM	(Spain)	Aday	37	EU	CD Tenerife	Transfer	Summer	2016	Free
4	CB	(France)	Lejerune	34	EU	Villarreal CF	Transfer	Summer	2016	Free
22	RB	(Spain)	Garrido	35	EU	Elche CF	On loan	Summer	2015	Loan
29	CM	(Spain)	Pons	32	EU	UE Olot	On loan	Summer	2017	Loan
6	CM	(Spain)	Granell	37	EU	AE Prat	Transfer	Summer	2014	Free
9	CF	(Spain)	Jaime Mata	37	EU	Lleida Esportiu	Transfer	Summer	2016	Free

Total spending: ▼€0

=== Transfer out ===
Number	Position	Nat	Name	Age	EU	Moving to	Type	Transfer window	Transfer fee	Source
26	CM	(Spain)	Vivancos	31	EU	CE L'Hospitalet	On loan	Summer	Loan
18	SS	(Spain)	Tato	32	EU	Real Zaragoza	Transfer	Summer	Free
9	CF	(Spain)	Chando	44	EU	CD Atlético Baleares	Transfer	Summer	Free
5	CB	(Spain)	Chus	41	EU	Real Valladolid	Transfer	Summer
27	CF	(Spain)	Gumbau	30	EU	FC Barcelona B	Transfer	Summer
2	RM	(Spain)	I. López	32	EU	Levante UD	End of loan	Summer	End of loan
12	DM	(Portugal)	Cá	32	EU	FC Barcelona B	End of loan	Summer	End of loan
21	LW	(Spain)	Adrià	33	EU	RCD Espanyol B	Transfer	Summer
39	DM	(Spain)	Ortuño	34	EU	Granada CF	End of loan	Summer	End of loan
22	CB	(Spain)	Migue	45	EU	Deportivo Alavés	Transfer	Summer

Total spending: ▲€0

== Kits ==
Supplier: Kappa
Sponsor(s): Bruixa d'Or

Home	Away

Last updated: 17 February 2015.
Source: GironaFC.es

== Friendlies ==
=== Pre-season ===
==== Friendlies ====
Round	Date	Time	Opponent	Score	Scorer	Stadium	Location	Attendance	Referee
Pre-season	2 August 2014	18:30	RCD Espanyol B	0 – 1	Sandaza 18'	Dani Jarque	Sant Adrià de Besòs, Catalonia, Spain	200	Víctor Manuel (Spain)
Pre-season	5 August 2014	20:00	RCD Espanyol	2 – 1	Jandro 18' Mata 71'	Montilivi	Girona, Catalonia, Spain
Pre-season	9 August 2014	19:30	UE Llagostera	1 – 0	Mata (88 p)	Montilivi	Girona, Catalonia, Spain	1,523

== Competitions ==
=== Overall ===
As of 29 March 2015

Competition	Started round	Current position/round	Final position	First match	Last match
Segunda División	—	4th		24 August 2014	25 May 2014
Copa del Rey	Second round	–	Third round	9 September 2014	15 October 2014

=== Liga Adelante ===
==== Matches ====
Kickoff times are in CET and CEST

Round	Date	Time	Opponent	Score	Scorer	Live TV	Stadium	Location	Attendance	Referee
1	24 August 2014	20:00	(Spain) Racing Santander	1 – 0	Sanchón 15'		Montilivi	Girona, Catalonia, Spain	3,080	David Pérez (Spain)
2	30 August 2014	20:00	(Spain) AD Alcorcón	1 – 2	Sandaza 52' J. Mata 59'		Santo Domingo	Alcorcón, Madrid, Spain	2,000	Rubén Eiriz (Spain)
3	6 September 2014	20:00	(Spain) CD Tenerife	2 – 0	Sandaza (26 p) Sanchón 65'		Montilivi	Girona, Catalonia, Spain	2,934	Dámaso Arcediano (Spain)
4	14 September 2014	11:00	(Spain) Sporting Gijón	1 – 1	Juncà 89'		El Molinón	Gijón, Asturias, Spain	14,112	Daniel Ocón (Spain)
5	21 September 2014	14:00	(Spain) Real Betis	1 – 3	Sanchón 12'		Montilivi	Girona, Catalonia, Spain	7,284	Valdés Aller (Spain)
6	28 September 2014	16:00	(Spain) CD Numancia	2 – 2	J. Mata 49' Jandro 89'		Los Pajaritos	Soria, Castille and León, Spain	3,000	Gorka Sagués (Spain)
7	4 October 2014	17:00	(Spain) SD Ponferradina	3 – 0	Richy 22' Aday 67' Sandaza 85'		Montilivi	Girona, Catalonia, Spain	3,682	José Lesma (Spain)
8	11 October 2014	19:00	(Spain) Albacete Balompié	0 – 1	Sanchón 25'		Carlos Belmonte	Albacete, Castilla-La Mancha, Spain	7,300	Ricardo de Burgos Bengoetxea (Spain)
9	18 October 2014	19:00	(Spain) CE Sabadell	0 – 2	Sanchón 15', 25'		Nova Creu Alta	Sabadell, Catalonia, Spain	4,412	Juan López (Spain)
10	26 October 2014	17:00	(Spain) CD Mirandés	3 - 0	Sanchón (20 p) Sandaza 52' Bordas 81'		Montilivi	Girona, Catalonia, Spain	4,506	Jorge Figueroa (Spain)
11	2 November 2014	17:00	(Spain) Real Valladolid	2 - 1	Juncà 87'		José Zorrilla	Valladolid, Castille and León, Spain	10,913	David Pérez (Spain)
12	8 November 2014	20:00	(Spain) UD Las Palmas	1 - 2	Sanchón 22'		Montilivi	Girona, Catalonia, Spain	5,017	Daniel Ocón (Spain)
13	15 November 2014	14:00	(Spain) CD Leganés	1 - 2	Sandaza 34', 90'		Butarque	Leganés, Madrid, Spain	4,500	Oliver de La Fuente (Spain)
14	23 November 2014	17:00	(Spain) Recreativo Huelva	2 - 0	Sanchón 2' Granell 34'		Montilivi	Girona, Catalonia, Spain	5,507	Jesús Muñoz (Spain)
15	29 November 2014	18:00	(Spain) CA Osasuna	0 - 0			El Sadar	Pamplona, Navarre, Spain	11,526	Arias López (Spain)
16	7 December 2014	12:00	(Spain) FC Barcelona B	0 - 1			Montilivi	Girona, Catalonia, Spain	4,705	Ricardo de Burgos Bengoetxea (Spain)
17	14 December 2014	17:00	(Spain) Real Zaragoza	2 - 1	Mata 14'		La Romareda	Zaragoza, Aragon, Spain	12,000	José María Sánchez Martínez (Spain)
18	20 December 2014	16:00	(Spain) Deportivo Alavés	2 - 2	Richy 27' Sandaza 89'		Montilivi	Girona, Catalonia, Spain	3,905	Oliver de La Fuente (Spain)
19	3 January 2015	18:00	(Spain) UE Llagostera	1 - 2	J. Mata 11 ' Ramalho 27'		Palamós Costa Brava	Palamós, Catalonia, Spain	3,576	Valdés Aller (Spain)
20	10 January 2015	18:00	(Spain) RCD Mallorca	0 - 0			Montilivi	Girona, Catalonia, Spain	3,928	Daniel Trujillo (Spain)
21	17 January 2015	20:00	(Spain) CD Lugo	1 - 2	Sandaza 20' Granell 22'		Anxo Carro	Lugo, Galicia, Spain	3,680	José Luis Munuera Montero (Spain)
22	25 January 2015	18:15	(Spain) Racing Santander	0 - 1	Juanpe (o.g.)		El Sardinero	Santander, Cantabria, Spain	7,194	Jesús Muñoz (Spain)
23	1 February 2015	17:00	(Spain) AD Alcorcón	3 - 0	Ramalho 57' Sandaza 65' Sanchón 90'		Montilivi	Girona, Catalonia, Spain	4,856	Pedro Sureda (Spain)
24	8 February 2015	20:00	(Spain) CD Tenerife	0 - 1	Lejeune 9'		Heliodoro Rodríguez López	Tenerife, Canary Islands, Spain	6,470	Daniel Ocón (Spain)
25	15 February 2015	12:00	(Spain) Sporting Gijón	0 - 0			Montilivi	Girona, Catalonia, Spain	5,425	Valentín Pizarro (Spain)
26	21 February 2015	20:00	(Spain) Real Betis	2 - 1	Granell 89'		Benito Villamarín	Seville, Andalusia, Spain	31,818	José Piñeiro (Spain)
27	1 March 2015	17:00	(Spain) CD Numancia	2 - 1	Granell (32 p) Sandaza (81 p)		Montilivi	Girona, Catalonia, Spain	5,122	Pablo Fuertes (Spain)
28	8 March 2015	17:00	(Spain) SD Ponferradina	3 - 0			El Toralín	Ponferrada, Castile and León, Spain	4,500	Dámaso Arcediano (Spain)
29	15 March 2015	18:00	(Spain) Albacete Balompié	2 - 2	Lejeune 43', Richy 63'	LaLiga TV, LAOLA1 TV, Esport3	Montilivi	Girona, Catalonia, Spain	8,040	Gorke Segués (Spain)
30	22 March 2015	17:00	(Spain) CE Sabadell	0 - 0		LaLiga TV, LAOAL1 TV, Esport3	Montilivi	Girona, Catalonia, Spain	5,183	David Pérez (Spain)
31	29 March 2015	16:00	(Spain) CD Mirandés	0 - 1	Richy 16'	LaLiga TV, LAOLA1 TV, Esport3	Anduva	Miranda de Ebro, Castile and León, Spain	3,225	Pedro Sureda (Spain)
32	4 April 2015	17:00	(Spain) Real Valladolid			LaLiga TV,	Montilivi	Girona, Catalonia, Spain		Víctor Areces (Spain)
33	11 April 2015	11:00	(Spain) UD Las Palmas				Gran Canaria	Las Palmas, Canary Islands, Spain
34	18 April 2015	--:--	(Spain) CD Leganés				Montilivi	Girona, Catalonia, Spain
35	25 April 2015	--:--	(Spain) Recreativo Huelva				Nuevo Colombino	Huelva, Andalusia, Spain
36	2 May 2015	--:--	(Spain) CA Osasuna				Montilivi	Girona, Catalonia, Spain
37	9 May 2015	--:--	(Spain) FC Barcelona B				Mini Estadi	Barcelona, Catalonia, Spain
38	16 May 2015	--:--	(Spain) Real Zaragoza				Montilivi	Girona, Catalonia, Spain
39	19 May 2015	--:--	(Spain) Deportivo Alavés				Mendizorrza	Vitoria-Gasteiz, Basque Country, Spain
40	23 May 2015	--:--	(Spain) UE Llagostera				Montilivi	Girona, Catalonia, Spain
41	30 May 2015	--:--	(Spain) RCD Mallorca				Iberostar	Palma, Balearic Islands, Spain
42	6 June 2015	--:--	(Spain) CD Lugo				Montilivi	Girona, Catalonia, Spain

==== Results by round ====
Round	1	2	3	4	5	6	7	8	9	10	11	12	13	14	15	16	17	18	19	20	21	22	23	24	25	26	27	28	29	30	31	32	33	34	35	36	37	38	39	40	41	42
Ground	H	A	H	A	H	A	H	A	A	H	A	H	A	H	A	H	A	H	A	H	A	A	H	A	H	A	H	A	H	H	A	H	A	H	A	H	A	H	A	H	A	H
Result	W	W	W	D	L	D	W	W	W	W	L	L	W	W	D	L	L	D	W	D	W	W	W	W	D	L	W	L	D	D	W	W	L	W	W	W	W	D	W	W	W	D
Position	8	3	1	2	4	6	2	1	1	1	2	4	2	2	1	3	3	5	3	5	4	5	2	2	3	5	5	5	5	5	4	2	4	3	2	2	2	2	2	2	2	3

Updated to match(es) played on 29 March 2015. Source: Competitive matches
A = Away; H = Home; W = Win; D = Draw; L = Loss

==== Results summary ====
Overall								Home						Away					
Pld	W	D	L	GF	GA	GD	Pts	W	D	L	GF	GA	GD	W	D	L	GF	GA	GD
31	16	8	7	42	27	+15	56	7	5	3	22	11	+11	9	3	4	20	16	+4

Last updated: 29 March 2015.
Source: Competitive matches

==== League table ====
Pos	Team	Pld	W	D	L	GF	GA	GD	Pts	Promotion, qualification or relegation
1	Real Betis (C, P)	42	25	9	8	73	40	+33	84	Promotion to La Liga
2	Sporting Gijón (P)	42	21	19	2	57	27	+30	82 (Note: Sporting Gijón finished ahead of Girona on goal difference; Sporting de Gijón +30, Girona +28)	Promotion to La Liga
3	Girona	42	24	10	8	63	35	+28	82	Qualification to promotion play-offs
4	Las Palmas (O, P)	42	22	12	8	73	47	+26	78	Qualification to promotion play-offs
5	Valladolid	42	21	9	12	65	40	+25	72	Qualification to promotion play-offs

Source: LFP - Liga Adelante
Rules for classification: 1) points; 2) head-to-head points; 3) head-to-head goal difference; 4) goal difference; 5) number of goals scored
(C) Champions; (O) Play-off winners; (P) Promoted
