= 2016–17 Girona FC season =

Girona FC
2016–17 season
- President: Delfí Geli
- Head coach: Pablo Machín
- Stadium: Montilivi
- Segunda División: 2nd
- Copa del Rey: Second round
- Top goalscorer: Samuele Longo (14)
| Home colours | Away colours |

The 2016–17 season is the 87th season in Girona FC ’s history and the 21st in the second-tier. They achieved promotion to La Liga for the first time in the club's history.

== Squad ==
Note: Flags indicate national team as defined under FIFA eligibility rules; some limited exceptions apply. Players may hold more than one non-FIFA nationality.

| No. | Pos. | Nation | Player |
|---|---|---|---|
| 1 | GK | (Spain) ESP | René Román |
| 3 | DF | (Colombia) COL | Johan Mojica (on loan from Rayo Vallecano) |
| 4 | DF | (Spain) ESP | Jonás Ramalho |
| 5 | DF | (Spain) ESP | Pedro Alcalá |
| 6 | MF | (Spain) ESP | Álex Granell |
| 7 | DF | (Spain) ESP | Richy (captain) |
| 8 | MF | (Spain) ESP | Pere Pons |
| 9 | MF | (Spain) ESP | Portu |
| 10 | MF | (Spain) ESP | Eloi Amagat |
| 11 | MF | (Spain) ESP | Aday Benítez |
| 12 | FW | (Italy) ITA | Samuele Longo (on loan from Internazionale) |

| No. | Pos. | Nation | Player |
|---|---|---|---|
| 13 | GK | (Morocco) MAR | Bono |
| 14 | MF | (Spain) ESP | Rubén Alcaraz |
| 15 | DF | (Spain) ESP | Juanpe |
| 16 | FW | (Spain) ESP | Cristian Herrera |
| 17 | DF | (Spain) ESP | Cifu (on loan from Málaga) |
| 19 | MF | (Spain) ESP | Felipe Sanchón |
| 20 | MF | (Spain) ESP | Sebas Coris |
| 21 | FW | (Spain) ESP | Fran Sandaza |
| 22 | DF | (Spain) ESP | Kiko Olivas |
| 23 | MF | (Spain) ESP | Juan Cámara (on loan from Barcelona) |
| 24 | MF | (Spain) ESP | Borja García |
| 25 | DF | (Spain) ESP | Pablo Maffeo (on loan from Manchester City) |

== Competitions ==
=== Overall ===
| Competition | Final position |
|---|---|
| Segunda División | 2nd |
| Copa del Rey | 2nd round |

=== Liga ===
==== League table ====
| Pos | Team | Pld | W | D | L | GF | GA | GD | Pts | Promotion, qualification or relegation |
|---|---|---|---|---|---|---|---|---|---|---|
| 1 | Levante (C, P) | 42 | 25 | 9 | 8 | 57 | 32 | +25 | 84 | Promotion to La Liga |
| 2 | Girona (P) | 42 | 20 | 10 | 12 | 65 | 45 | +20 | 70 | Promotion to La Liga |
| 3 | Getafe (O, P) | 42 | 18 | 14 | 10 | 55 | 43 | +12 | 68 | Qualification to promotion play-offs |
| 4 | Tenerife | 42 | 16 | 18 | 8 | 50 | 37 | +13 | 66 | Qualification to promotion play-offs |
| 5 | Cádiz | 42 | 16 | 16 | 10 | 55 | 40 | +15 | 64 | Qualification to promotion play-offs |

Source: La Liga
Rules for classification: 1) points; 2) head-to-head points; 3) head-to-head goal difference; 4) goal difference; 5) number of goals scored
(C) Champions; (O) Play-off winners; (P) Promoted

==== Matches ====
Kickoff times are in CET. Win Draw Loss

| Match | Opponent | Venue | Result |
|---|---|---|---|
| 1 | Sevilla At. | A | 3–3 |
| 2 | Elche | H | 3–1 |
| 3 | Valladolid | A | 2–1 |
| 4 | Almería | H | 3–3 |
| 5 | Mallorca | A | 1–0 |
| 6 | Mirandés | H | 1–1 |
| 7 | Getafe | A | 0–2 |
| 8 | Reus | H | 1–0 |
| 9 | Cádiz | A | 0–0 |
| 10 | Oviedo | H | 0–0 |
| 11 | Rayo | A | 1–0 |
| 12 | Numancia | H | 3–0 |
| 13 | Tenerife | H | 1–1 |
| 14 | UCAM | A | 0–1 |
| 15 | Lugo | H | 3–1 |
| 16 | Huesca | A | 1–2 |
| 17 | Levante | H | 2–1 |
| 18 | Alcorcón | A | 2–1 |
| 19 | Nàstic | H | 4–2 |
| 20 | Zaragoza | A | 0–2 |
| 21 | Córdoba | H | 2–0 |

| Match | Opponent | Venue | Result |
|---|---|---|---|
| 22 | Sevilla At. | H | 2–0 |
| 23 | Elche | A | 1–0 |
| 24 | Valladolid | H | 2–1 |
| 25 | Almería | A | 0–0 |
| 26 | Mallorca | H | 1–0 |
| 27 | Mirandés | A | 0–2 |
| 28 | Getafe | H | 5–1 |
| 29 | Reus | A | 1–2 |
| 30 | Cádiz | H | 1–2 |
| 31 | Oviedo | A | 2–0 |
| 32 | Rayo | H | 1–3 |
| 33 | Numancia | A | 0–2 |
| 34 | Tenerife | A | 3–3 |
| 35 | UCAM | H | 1–2 |
| 36 | Lugo | A | 1–2 |
| 37 | Huesca | H | 3–1 |
| 38 | Levante | A | 2–1 |
| 39 | Alcorcón | H | 0–0 |
| 40 | Nàstic | A | 3–1 |
| 41 | Zaragoza | H | 0–0 |
| 42 | Córdoba | A | 2–1 |
