= List of Girona FC seasons =

Girona FC are a Spanish professional association football club based in Girona, who currently play in La Liga. The list covers the period from 1930, when the club was founded, to the present day. It details the club's achievements in senior league and cup competitions, and the top scorers for each season.

== Key ==
- Pld = Matches played
- W = Matches won
- D = Matches drawn
- L = Matches lost
- GF = Goals for
- GA = Goals against
- Pts = Points
- Pos = Final position
- Segunda = Segunda División
- Segunda B = Segunda División B
- Tercera = Tercera División
- Primera = Primera Catalana
- Catalan 1st = The Catalan 1st Division, a regional football league organised due to the Spanish Civil War
- n/a = Not applicable
- QR = Qualifying round
- 1R = First Round
- 2R = Second Round
- 3R = Third Round
- 4R = Fourth Round
- 5R = Fifth Round
- 6R = Sixth Round
- R32 = Round of 32
- R16 = Round of 16
- QF = Quarter-finals
- SF = Semi-finals
- RU = Runners-up
- W = Winners

Champions	Runners-up	Promoted	Relegated

== Seasons ==
As of the end of the 2025–26 season.

Season	League										Copa del Rey	Copa Catalunya	Top scorer(s)^{[A]}	
Season	Tier	League	Pos	Pld	W	D	L	GF	GA	Pts	Copa del Rey	Copa Catalunya	Player(s)	Goals
1933–34	3	Tercera	1st^{[D]}^{[H]}	6	3	3	0	20	6	9				
1934–35	2	Segunda	4th	12	4	4	4	12	15	12	3R			
1935–36	2	Segunda	1st^{[E]}	14	10	1	3	34	13	21	R16			
1936–37	Catalan 1st		3rd	10	4	2	4	18	13	10	R16			
1937–38	Catalan 1st		5th	14	6	2	6	28	24	14				
Football suspended completely between 1938 and 1939 due to the Spanish Civil War
1939–40	2	Segunda	3rd	14	6	3	5	27	24	15	1R			
1940–41	2	Segunda	4th	22	12	2	8	44	28	26	3R			
1941–42	2	Segunda	5th	14	6	3	5	24	20	15				
1942–43	2	Segunda	6th^{[I]}	14	4	3	7	22	25	11				
1943–44	3	Tercera	5th	18	6	8	4	26	22	20	2R			
1944–45	3	Tercera	3rd	18	9	2	7	31	31	20				
1945–46	3	Tercera	6th	18	6	4	8	23	40	16				
1946–47	3	Tercera	4th	18	9	2	7	35	24	20				
1947–48	3	Tercera	1st^{[G]}	26	18	4	4	71	38	40	3R			
1948–49	2	Segunda	10th	26	10	2	14	45	53	22	R16			
1949–50	2	Segunda	9th	30	12	3	15	49	69	27	3R			
1950–51	2	Segunda	16th	32	11	5	16	59	64	27				
1951–52	3	Tercera	6th	30	17	2	11	72	44	36				
1952–53	3	Tercera	9th	34	16	6	12	61	44	38				
1953–54	3	Tercera	2nd^{[B]}	36	18	9	9	76	46	45				
1954–55	3	Tercera	1st^{[B]}	20	15	1	4	47	14	31				
1955–56	3	Tercera	2nd^{[G]}	22	12	5	5	50	33	29				
1956–57	2	Segunda	9th	38	15	7	16	54	53	37				
1957–58	2	Segunda	9th	34	14	5	15	42	57	33				
1958–59	2	Segunda	15th	30	11	3	16	43	64	25	1R			
1959–60	3	Tercera	11th	30	12	3	15	44	42	27				
1960–61	3	Tercera	4th	30	14	10	6	75	37	38				
1961–62	3	Tercera	2nd^{[C]}	32	17	8	7	92	52	42				
1962–63	3	Tercera	4th	30	15	6	9	63	46	36				
1963–64	3	Tercera	6th	38	18	6	14	86	63	42				
1964–65	3	Tercera	7th	38	17	7	14	64	48	41				
1965–66	3	Tercera	7th	38	14	10	14	14	52	38				
1966–67	3	Tercera	3rd^{[C]}	38	21	6	11	70	45	48				
1967–68	3	Tercera	8th	38	15	9	14	59	53	39				
1968–69	3	Tercera	11th	38	16	4	18	54	49	36				
1969–70	3	Tercera	3rd	38	20	11	7	85	36	51	2R			
1970–71	3	Tercera	2nd^{[F]}	38	21	10	7	53	26	52	1R			
1971–72	3	Tercera	8th	38	15	11	12	45	31	41	1R			
1972–73	3	Tercera	2nd^{[F]}	38	17	13	8	42	26	47	2R			
1973–74	3	Tercera	3rd	38	15	13	10	56	35	43	1R			
1974–75	3	Tercera	6th	38	17	6	15	52	42	40	2R			
1975–76	3	Tercera	3rd	38	19	7	12	54	40	45	1R			
1976–77	3	Tercera	2nd	38	20	6	12	71	39	46	3R			
1977–78	3	Segunda B	6th	38	18	3	17	48	49	39	3R			
1978–79	3	Segunda B	13th	38	12	9	17	52	58	33	3R			
1979–80	3	Segunda B	19th	38	9	10	19	40	64	28	1R			
1980–81	4	Tercera	7th	38	17	9	12	63	45	43				
1981–82	4	Tercera	18th	38	9	8	21	42	69					
1982–83	5	Primera Cat.	1st	38	25	7	6	92	25	57				
1983–84	4	Tercera	9th	38	15	11	12	56	42	41				
1984–85	4	Tercera	7th	38	18	8	12	62	41	44				
1985–86	4	Tercera	2nd	38	20	7	11	81	54	47				
1986–87	4	Tercera	7th^{[H]}	38	14	14	10	66	62	42	1R			
1987–88	3	Segunda B	19th	38	8	14	16	50	56	30				
1988–89	4	Tercera	1st	42	27	8	7	93	46	62	1R			
1989–90	3	Segunda B	12th	38	14	9	15	51	62	37				
1990–91	3	Segunda B	7th	38	16	15	7	47	32	47	2R	SF		
1991–92	3	Segunda B	3rd^{[B]}	38	19	10	9	66	44	48				
1992–93	3	Segunda B	15th	38	10	12	16	36	50	32	3R			
1993–94	3	Segunda B	15th	38	11	11	16	36	60	33	1R			
1994–95	3	Segunda B	18th	38	6	10	22	38	72	22	1R	1R		
1995–96	4	Tercera	13th	38	12	11	15	43	55	47				
1996–97	4	Tercera	19th	40	6	8	26	44	80	26				
1997–98	5	Primera Cat.	5th	38	18	10	10	57	32	64				
1998–99	5	Primera Cat.	1st	38	25	7	6	76	33	82				
1999–2000	4	Tercera	7th	38	15	13	10	49	47	58				
2000–01	4	Tercera	8th	38	13	16	9	46	38	55				
2001–02	4	Tercera	9th	38	15	7	16	40	45	52				
2002–03	4	Tercera	2nd	38	20	10	8	83	42	70				
2003–04	3	Segunda B	7th	38	17	10	11	58	41	61		SF		
2004–05	3	Segunda B	17th	38	10	15	13	40	49	45	R32			
2005–06	4	Tercera	1st^{[D]}	38	25	9	4	86	40	84				
2006–07	4	Tercera	2nd	38	25	5	8	64	34	80	1R	QF		
2007–08	3	Segunda B	1st	38	20	12	6	61	28	72		SF		
2008–09	2	Segunda	16th	42	11	16	15	43	54	49	3R	4R		
2009–10	2	Segunda	14th	42	13	13	16	45	59	52	3R	5R		
2010–11	2	Segunda	11th	42	15	12	15	58	56	57	2R	SF		
2011–12	2	Segunda	15th	42	12	13	17	58	61	49	2R	2nd Stage 5R		
2012–13	2	Segunda	4th^{[F]}	42	21	8	13	74	56	71	2R	4R		
2013–14	2	Segunda	15th	42	12	15	15	52	50	51	R32	6R		
2014–15	2	Segunda	3rd^{[E]}	42	24	10	8	63	35	82	3R	RU		
2015–16	2	Segunda	4th^{[F]}	42	17	15	10	46	28	66	2R	SF		
2016–17	2	Segunda	2nd	42	20	10	12	65	45	70	2R	RU	Samuele Longo	14
2017–18	1	La Liga	10th	38	14	9	15	50	59	51	R32	QF	Cristhian Stuani	21
2018–19	1	La Liga	18th	38	9	10	19	37	53	37	QF		Cristhian Stuani	20
2019–20	2	Segunda	5th^{[F]}	42	17	12	13	48	43	63	R32		Cristhian Stuani	31
2020–21	2	Segunda	5th^{[F]}	42	20	11	11	47	36	71	R16		Mamadou Sylla	11
2021–22	2	Segunda	6th^{[G]}	42	20	11	11	47	36	71	R16		Cristhian Stuani	24
2022–23	1	La Liga	10th	38	13	10	15	58	55	49	2R		Taty Castellanos	14
2023–24	1	La Liga	3rd	38	25	6	7	85	46	81	QF		Artem Dovbyk	24
2024–25	1	La Liga	16th	38	11	8	19	44	60	41	2R	W	Cristhian Stuani	11
2025–26	1	La Liga	19th	38	9	14	15	39	55	41	2R		Vladyslav Vanat	10

== Footnotes ==
- ^{A} All goals in competitive matches included. Goals scored in friendly matches do not count.
- ^{B} Eliminated in the group stage of the play-offs.
- ^{C} Eliminated in the first eliminatory stage of the play-offs.
- ^{D} Eliminated in the second eliminatory stage of the play-offs.
- ^{E} Eliminated in the semi-finals of the play-offs.
- ^{F} Eliminated in the finals of the play-offs.
- ^{G} Promoted via the play-offs.
- ^{H} Did not qualify directly for promotion through league or play-off performance but was promoted anyway due to league reorganisation.
- ^{I} Did not qualify directly for relegation through league or play-off performance but was relegated anyway due to league reorganisation.
