= Marcelo Djaló =

Bissau-Guinean footballer

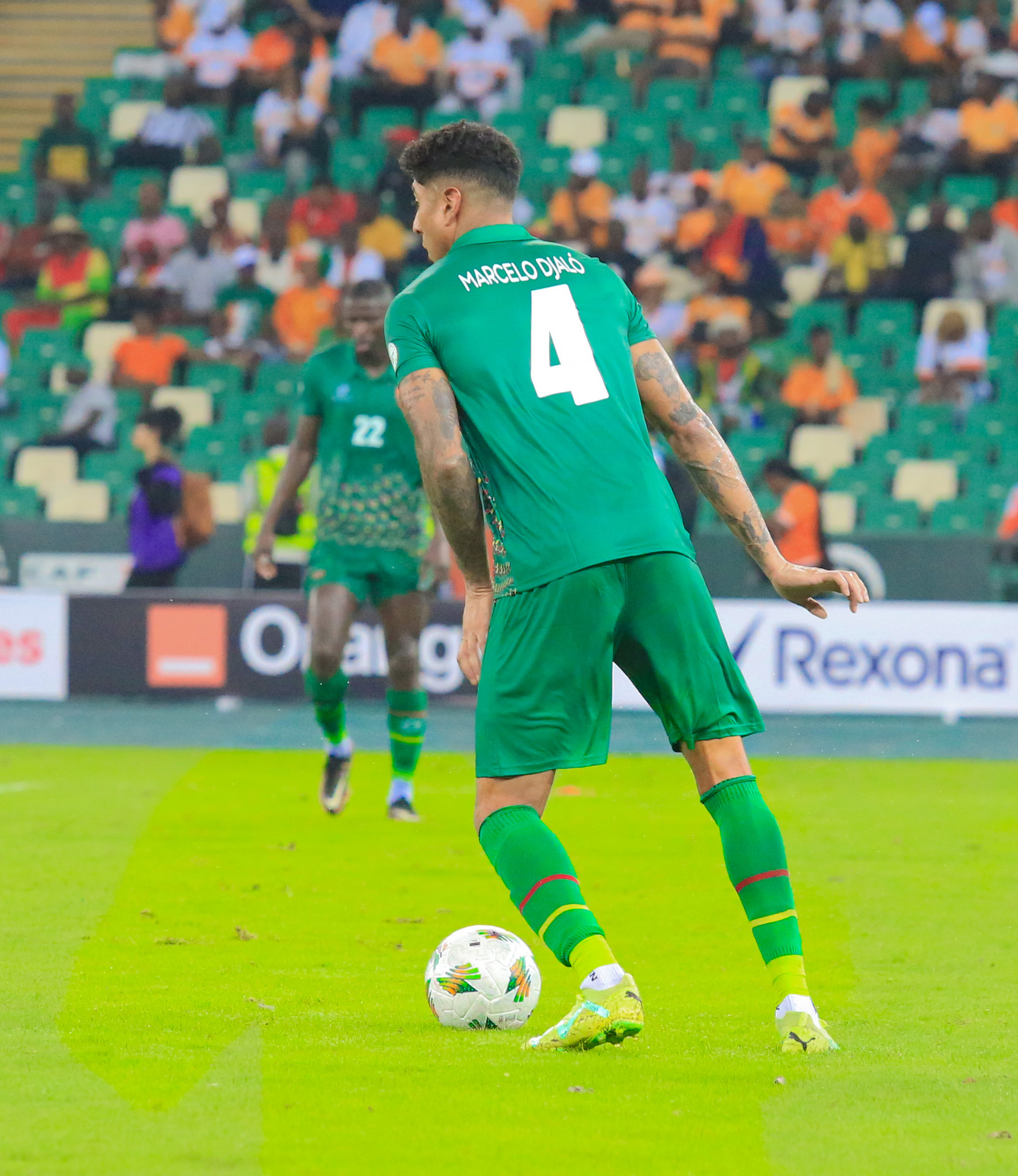
- Djaló in 2024

Personal information
- Full name: Marcelo Amado Djaló Taritolay
- Date of birth: 8 October 1993 (age 33)
- Place of birth: Barcelona, Spain
- Height: 1.92 m (6 ft 4 in)
- Position: Centre-back

Team information
- Current team: Persik Kediri
- Number: 55

Youth career
- 1999–2002: Pineda
- 2002–2006: Mataró
- 2006–2009: Sánchez Llibre
- 2009–2012: Real Madrid

Senior career*
Years	Team	Apps	(Gls)
2012–2013	Badalona	21	(2)
2013–2014	Granada B	26	(0)
2014–2016	Juventus	0	(0)
2014–2015	→ Granada B (loan)	19	(0)
2015–2016	→ Girona (loan)	0	(0)
2016	→ UCAM Murcia (loan)	7	(0)
2016–2017	Lugo	25	(2)
2017–2019	Fulham	2	(0)
2018–2019	→ Extremadura (loan)	12	(0)
2019–2021	Lugo	42	(1)
2021	Boavista	1	(0)
2022–2023	Hércules	1	(0)
2023–2024	Palencia	16	(2)
2024–2025	Buriram United	19	(0)
2025–2026	Uthai Thani	27	(3)
2026–	Persik Kediri	8	(0)

International career^{‡}
2019–	Guinea-Bissau	24	(1)
- * Club domestic league appearances and goals as of 31 October 2026 ‡ National team caps and goals as of 5 September 2024

Marcelo Amado Djaló Taritolay (born 8 October 1993) is a professional footballer who plays as a centre-back for Super League club Persik Kediri. Born in Spain, he represents Guinea-Bissau at international level.

== Club career ==
=== Early career ===
Born in Barcelona, Spain, Marcelo was a Real Madrid youth graduate. In July 2012, after being released, he went on a trial at Segunda División B's CF Badalona, signing a contract one month later. He made his senior debuts with the latter in the 2012–13 campaign, appearing in 21 matches and scoring two goals, but left in June 2013.

In the summer of 2013, Marcelo moved to Granada CF, being assigned to the reserves also in the third level. On 19 August 2014 he signed for Juventus FC, being immediately loaned back to the Andalusians for one year.

On 14 January 2015, Marcelo made his first team debut, playing the full 90 minutes in a 0–4 away loss against Sevilla FC for the season's Copa del Rey.

=== Girona / UCAM Murcia ===
On 11 July 2015, Marcelo moved to Girona FC, in a season-long loan deal. His debut for the club came on 9 September, where he started and scored a last-minute equalizer in a 2–2 away draw against Gimnàstic de Tarragona for the national cup; his side, however, was knocked out on penalties.

Marcelo failed to make a single league appearance for the club, being only a sixth choice behind Florian Lejeune, Kiko Olivas, Pedro Alcalá, Richy and Carles Mas. On 18 April 2016, he terminated his loan with the Catalans, and immediately joined UCAM Murcia CF on loan until June.

=== Lugo ===
On 7 July, after helping UCAM in the club's first ever promotion to Segunda División, Marcelo signed a two-year deal with CD Lugo. He made his debut in the second tier on 27 August 2016, coming on as a second-half substitute for Carlos Hernández in a 3–3 home draw against Real Zaragoza.

Marcelo scored his first goal in the category on 11 December 2016, netting his team's second in a 3–1 home win against CD Numancia. He contributed with two goals in 25 appearances during the campaign, as his side finished eighth.

=== Fulham ===
Fulham confirmed the signing of Marcelo on 3 July 2017. He signed a three-year contract for an undisclosed fee. He made his Fulham debut in an EFL Cup tie against Wycombe Wanderers on 8 August 2017.

On 15 August 2018, Marcelo returned to Spain and its second division after agreeing to a one-year loan deal with Extremadura UD. His loan was cut short on 31 January 2019 after 12 league appearances.

=== Return to Lugo ===
On 27 August 2019, Marcelo returned to Lugo after agreeing to a three-year contract.

=== Boavista ===
On 31 August 2021, he joined Boavista in Portugal, signing a contract until the end of the 2021–22 season, with an option for an additional year. On 18 November 2021, Marcelo's contract with Boavista was terminated for "personal and family reasons".

=== Hercules ===
On 5 August 2022, Marcelo signed a one-year contract with Hércules in the fourth-tier Segunda Federación. On 4 September 2022, in a season opener against Mallorca B, Marcelo suffered a tibia fracture. His knee ligaments were also damaged and the recovery after surgery was expected to last approximately a year.

=== Palencia ===
On 7 September 2023, Djaló joined Spanish Tercera Federación club Palencia on a one-year contract.

=== Thailand ===
On 1 July 2024, Djaló joined Buriram United in the Thai League 1, signing a one-year contract. He left the club as a free agent on 4 July 2025. On 10 September 2025, he joined Uthai Thani. He scored his first goal in Thailand on 8 November 2025 in a 3–1 victory against Muangthong United.

== International career ==
Djaló qualified to play for Spain through his birth in Barcelona, Guinea-Bissau through his father, or Argentina through his mother. In March 2019, he accepted a call-up from Guinea-Bissau for a 2019 Africa Cup of Nations qualifying match against Mozambique, but did not make his debut.

He made his debut on 8 June 2019 in a friendly against Angola, as a starter. Represented the national team at 2019 Africa Cup of Nations.

== Personal life ==
Djaló was born in Spain, and is of Bissau-Guinean and Argentine descent.

== Career statistics ==
=== Club ===
As of match played 31 October 2026

Appearances and goals by club, season and competition
Club	Season	League			National Cup		League Cup		Other		Total	
Club	Season	Division	Apps	Goals	Apps	Goals	Apps	Goals	Apps	Goals	Apps	Goals
Badalona	2012–13	Segunda División B	21	2	1	0	—		—		22	2
Granada B	2013–14	Segunda División B	26	0	—		—		—		26	0
Granada B	2014–15	Segunda División B	19	0	—		—		—		19	0
Granada B	Total		45	0	—		—		—		45	0
Granada	2014–15	La Liga	0	0	1	0	—		—		1	0
Girona	2015–16	Segunda División	0	0	1	1	—		—		1	1
UCAM Murcia	2015–16	Segunda División B	7	0	0	0	—		—		7	0
Lugo	2016–17	Segunda División	25	2	1	0	—		—		26	1
Fulham	2017–18	Championship	2	0	0	0	2	0	—		4	0
Extremadura (loan)	2018–19	Segunda División	12	0	1	0	—		—		13	0
Lugo	2019–20	Segunda División	23	1	1	0	—		—		24	1
Lugo	2020–21	Segunda División	19	0	2	0	—		—		21	0
Lugo	Total		42	1	3	0	—		—		45	1
Boavista	2021–22	Primeira Liga	1	0	1	0	1	0	—		3	0
Hércules	2022–23	Segunda Federación	1	0	0	0	—		—		1	0
Palencia	2023–24	Tercera Federación	16	2	0	0	—		—		16	2
Buriram United	2024–25	Thai League 1	19	0	0	0	—		8 (Note: Appearances in ASEAN Club Championship and AFC Champions League)	1	27	1
Uthai Thani	2025–26	Thai League 1	27	3	2	1	1	0	—		30	4
Persik Kediri	2026–27	Super League	8	0	0	0	0	0	—		8	0
Career total			226	10	11	2	4	0	8	1	249	13

=== International ===
As of match played 5 September 2024

National team	Year	Apps	Goals
Guinea-Bissau	2019	5	0
Guinea-Bissau	2020	2	0
Guinea-Bissau	2021	6	1
Guinea-Bissau	2023	3	0
Guinea-Bissau	2024	8	0
Total		24	1

List of international goals scored by Marcelo Djaló
No.	Date	Venue	Opponent	Score	Result	Competition
1	26 March 2021	Mavuso Sports Centre, Manzini, Eswatini	Eswatini	1–0	3–1	2021 Africa Cup of Nations qualification

== Honours ==
Buriram United

- Thai League 1: 2024–25
- Thai FA Cup: 2024–25
- Thai League Cup: 2024–25
- ASEAN Club Championship: 2024–25
