= Isaac Becerra =

Spanish footballer (born 1988)

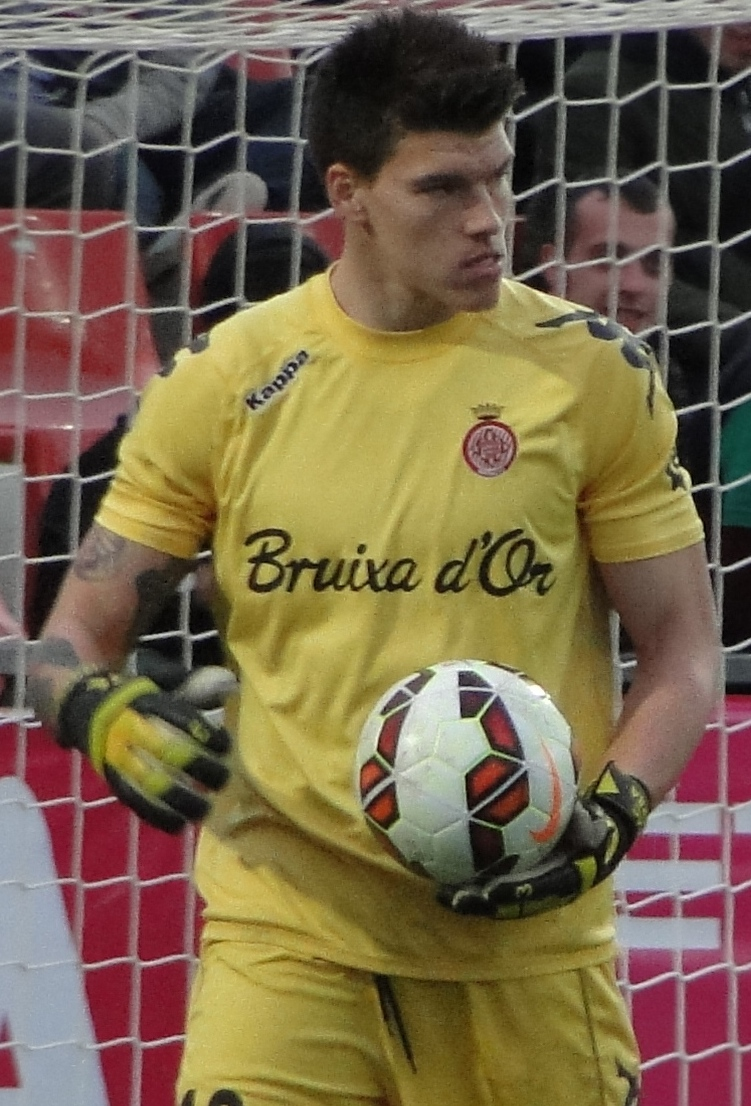
- Becerra with Girona in 2015

Personal information
- Full name: Isaac Becerra Alguacil
- Date of birth: 18 June 1988 (age 38)
- Place of birth: Badalona, Spain
- Height: 1.80 m (5 ft 11 in)
- Position: Goalkeeper

Youth career
- 1998–2000: Barcelona
- 2000–2003: Damm
- 2003–2005: Ferrán Martorell
- 2005–2007: Espanyol

Senior career*
Years	Team	Apps	(Gls)
2007–2010	Espanyol B	40	(0)
2009–2010	→ Panionios (loan)	4	(0)
2010–2012	Real Madrid B	3	(0)
2012–2016	Girona	128	(0)
2016–2018	Valladolid	34	(0)
2018–2019	Gimnàstic	18	(0)
2019–2021	Córdoba	39	(0)
2021–2022	Cerdanyola	34	(0)
2022–2023	Badalona Futur	11	(0)
Total		311	(0)

International career
2007	Spain U19	1	(0)
2019	Catalonia	1	(0)
- * Club domestic league appearances and goals

Isaac Becerra Alguacil (born 18 June 1988) is a Spanish former professional footballer who played as a goalkeeper.

He played 180 games in the Segunda División, mostly for Girona but also for Valladolid and Gimnàstic.

== Club career ==
=== Early years ===
Born in Badalona, Barcelona, Catalonia, Becerra was on the books of both regional powerhouses FC Barcelona and RCD Espanyol as a youth. He made his senior debut for the latter's reserves in the Segunda División B, playing the two final games of the 2006–07 season, both defeats. The following campaign, he appeared in 12 matches and was sent off once as the team suffered relegation.

After a loan to Panionios F.C. of the Super League Greece, he moved to another B team, Real Madrid Castilla in 2010. He was used rarely during his tenure, winning promotion to Segunda División as champions in his second year.

=== Girona ===
On 29 June 2012, Becerra returned to his native region, signing a two-year deal with second level club Girona FC. Despite only playing three times in the league season, he contested all four play-off games, assisting one of Javier Acuña's goals in a 3–1 home win against AD Alcorcón in the second leg of the semi-final.

On 20 February 2014, with his deal due to expire in the summer, Becerra extended his stay at the Estadi Montilivi for another two years. In 2014–15, he was ever-present as the side came a best-ever third, and both he and teammate Álex Granell were named in the division's Team of the Year at the LFP Awards. In the first leg of the play-offs on 11 June, he kept a clean sheet in a 3–0 away victory over Real Zaragoza, and manager Pablo Machín highlighted him for praise.

Becerra was the Segunda División Player of the Month for April 2016, after conceding one goal in five matches to put Girona one point off the play-offs – by that point, he was an undisputed starter and had kept 15 clean sheets. He was again named the division's Goalkeeper of the Year.

=== Valladolid ===
On 23 June 2016, Becerra joined Real Valladolid for three years. He conceded no goals on his debut on 21 August, as his team began the season with a 1–0 home defeat of Real Oviedo.

Becerra was back-up to new signing Jordi Masip the following campaign, playing only cup games and the dying moments of the victorious play-off final against CD Numancia.

=== Gimnàstic ===
On 31 July 2018, Becerra signed a three-year deal with Gimnàstic de Tarragona still in the second division. He appeared in roughly the same number of matches as Bernabé Barragán during the season, as the team finished third from the bottom and were relegated; as a result, his contract was automatically terminated due to a clause.

=== Later career ===
Becerra joined Córdoba CF on 10 July 2019, on a two-year contract. He was sent off the following 16 February in a 2–1 home victory against Sevilla Atlético, for a foul on José Lara.

After two third-tier campaigns for Córdoba, Becerra returned to his native region on 30 August 2021, signing with Cerdanyola del Vallès FC in the new Segunda División RFEF. In summer 2022, he moved to CF Badalona Futur in the same league.

== International career ==
In March 2019, Becerra was chosen for the unofficial Catalonia national team for the first time. He made his debut on 25 March in a 2–1 win over Venezuela at his former club ground in Girona, coming on as a half-time substitute for Edgar Badia.

== Career statistics ==
Appearances and goals by club, season and competition
Club	Season	League			Cup		Europe		Other		Total	
Club	Season	Division	Apps	Goals	Apps	Goals	Apps	Goals	Apps	Goals	Apps	Goals
Espanyol B	2006–07	Segunda División B	2	0	—		—		—		2	0
Espanyol B	2007–08	Segunda División B	12	0	—		—		—		12	0
Espanyol B	2008–09	Tercera División	26	0	—		—		—		26	0
Espanyol B	Total		40	0	—		—		—		40	0
Espanyol	2006–07	La Liga	0	0	0	0	0	0	0	0	0	0
Espanyol	2007–08	La Liga	0	0	0	0	—		—		3	0
Espanyol	Total		0	0	0	0	0	0	0	0	0	0
Panionios (loan)	2009–10	Super League Greece	4	0	0	0	—		—		4	0
Real Madrid B	2010–11	Segunda División B	0	0	—		—		0	0	0	0
Real Madrid B	2011–12	Segunda División B	3	0	—		—		0	0	3	0
Real Madrid B	Total		3	0	—		—		0	0	3	0
Girona	2012–13	Segunda División	3	0	1	0	—		4	0	8	0
Girona	2013–14	Segunda División	41	0	1	0	—		—		42	0
Girona	2014–15	Segunda División	42	0	0	0	—		2	0	44	0
Girona	2015–16	Segunda División	42	0	0	0	—		4	0	46	0
Girona	Total		128	0	2	0	—		10	0	140	0
Valladolid	2016–17	Segunda División	34	0	0	0	—		—		34	0
Valladolid	2017–18	Segunda División	0	0	4	0	—		1	0	5	0
Valladolid	Total		34	0	4	0	—		1	0	39	0
Gimnàstic	2018–19	Segunda División	18	0	1	0	—		—		19	0
Córdoba	2019–20	Segunda División B	27	0	0	0	—		—		27	0
Córdoba	2020–21	Segunda División B	12	0	1	0	—		—		13	0
Córdoba	Total		39	0	1	0	—		—		40	0
Cerdanyola	2021–22	Segunda División RFEF	34	0	—		—		1	0	35	0
Badalona Futur	2022–23	Segunda Federación	11	0	—		—		—		11	0
Career total			311	0	8	0	0	0	12	0	331	0

== Honours ==
Real Madrid Castilla

- Segunda División B: 2011–12

Spain U19

- UEFA European Under-19 Championship: 2007

Individual

- Ricardo Zamora Trophy (Segunda División): 2015–16
- Segunda División Team of the Year: 2014–15
- Segunda División Player of the Month: April 2016
