= 2019–20 Girona FC season =

Girona
2019–20 season
- President: Delfí Geli
- Head coach: José Luis Martí
- Stadium: Estadi Montilivi
- Segunda División: 5th
- Play-offs: Runners-up
- Copa del Rey: Round of 32
- Top goalscorer: League: Cristhian Stuani (29); All: Cristhian Stuani (31)
Home colours	Away colours

The 2019–20 season was Girona Futbol Club's 90th season in existence and the club's first season back in the second division of Spanish football. In addition to the domestic league, Girona FC participated in this season's edition of the Copa del Rey. The season was slated to cover a period from 1 July 2019 to 30 June 2020. It was extended extraordinarily beyond 30 June due to the COVID-19 pandemic in Spain.

== Players ==
=== Current squad ===
As of 31 January 2020

Note: Flags indicate national team as defined under FIFA eligibility rules; some limited exceptions apply. Players may hold more than one non-FIFA nationality.

No.	Pos.	Nation	Player
1	GK	(Spain) ESP	Juan Carlos
2	DF	(Spain) ESP	Ignasi Miquel (on loan from Getafe)
3	DF	(Colombia) COL	Johan Mojica
4	DF	(Spain) ESP	Jonás Ramalho
5	DF	(Spain) ESP	Pedro Alcalá (4th captain)
6	MF	(Spain) ESP	Álex Granell (captain)
7	FW	(Uruguay) URU	Cristhian Stuani (3rd captain)
8	MF	(Spain) ESP	Jairo Izquierdo
10	MF	(Spain) ESP	Borja García
11	MF	(Spain) ESP	Aday Benítez (vice-captain)
12	DF	(Spain) ESP	Brian Oliván (on loan from Cádiz)
13	GK	(Spain) ESP	Asier Riesgo
14	MF	(Spain) ESP	Samuel Sáiz

No.	Pos.	Nation	Player
15	DF	(Spain) ESP	Juanpe
16	MF	(Spain) ESP	Christian Rivera (on loan from Las Palmas)
17	DF	(Spain) ESP	Jordi Calavera (on loan from Eibar)
18	DF	(Uruguay) URU	Santiago Bueno
19	FW	(Spain) ESP	Jonathan Soriano
20	DF	(Spain) ESP	Pablo Maffeo (on loan from VfB Stuttgart)
21	MF	(Spain) ESP	Álex Gallar
22	MF	(Spain) ESP	Jozabed (on loan from Celta)
23	MF	(Senegal) SEN	Pape Maly Diamanka
24	MF	(Spain) ESP	Gerard Gumbau
25	FW	(Spain) ESP	Brandon (on loan from Osasuna)
27	GK	(Spain) ESP	José Aurelio Suárez
34	MF	(Spain) ESP	Valery Fernández

=== Out on loan ===
Note: Flags indicate national team as defined under FIFA eligibility rules; some limited exceptions apply. Players may hold more than one non-FIFA nationality.

No.	Pos.	Nation	Player
—	GK	(Morocco) MAR	Bono (at Sevilla until 30 June 2020)
—	DF	(Colombia) COL	Bernardo Espinosa (at Espanyol until 30 June 2020)
—	DF	(Uruguay) URU	Maxi Villa (at Ponferradina until 30 June 2020)

No.	Pos.	Nation	Player
—	MF	(Cameroon) CMR	Kévin Soni (at Espanyol B until 30 June 2020)
—	FW	(Spain) ESP	Álex Pachón (at AE Prat until 30 June 2020)
—	FW	(Honduras) HON	Anthony Lozano (at Cádiz until 30 June 2020)

== Pre-season and friendlies ==
Win Draw Loss

10 August 2019 Friendly	Girona	0–2	Huesca	Girona, Spain
20:00 CEST (UTC+2)				Stadium: Estadi Montilivi

== Competitions ==
=== Overview ===
Competition	First match	Last match	Starting round	Final position	Record							
Competition	First match	Last match	Starting round	Final position	Pld	W	D	L	GF	GA	GD	Win %
Segunda División	18 August 2019	20 July 2020	Matchday 1	5th	42	17	12	13	48	43	+5	40.48
Segunda División promotion play-offs	13 August 2020	23 August 2020	Semi-finals	Runners-up	4	2	1	1	3	2	+1	50.00
Copa del Rey	19 December 2019	22 January 2020	First round	Round of 32	3	2	0	1	6	6	+0	66.67
Total					49	21	13	15	57	51	+6	42.86

Source: Competitions

=== Segunda División ===
==== League table ====
Pos	Team	Pld	W	D	L	GF	GA	GD	Pts	Promotion, qualification or relegation
3	Zaragoza	42	18	11	13	59	53	+6	65	Qualification to promotion play-offs
4	Almería	42	17	13	12	62	43	+19	64	Qualification to promotion play-offs
5	Girona	42	17	12	13	48	43	+5	63	Qualification to promotion play-offs
6	Elche (O, P)	42	16	13	13	52	44	+8	61	Qualification to promotion play-offs
7	Rayo Vallecano	42	13	21	8	60	50	+10	60 (Note: Rayo Vallecano finished ahead of Fuenlabrada on head-to-head points: Fuenlabrada 2–2 Rayo Vallecano, Rayo Vallecano 1–0 Fuenlabrada.)	

Source: LaLiga Soccerway
Rules for classification: 1) points; 2) head-to-head points; 3) head-to-head goal difference; 4) goal difference; 5) number of goals scored
(O) Play-off winners; (P) Promoted

==== Results summary ====
Overall								Home						Away					
Pld	W	D	L	GF	GA	GD	Pts	W	D	L	GF	GA	GD	W	D	L	GF	GA	GD
42	17	12	13	48	43	+5	63	14	5	2	29	13	+16	3	7	11	19	30	−11

Source: La Liga SmartBank

==== Results by round ====
Round	1	2	3	4	5	6	7	8	9	10	11	12	13	14	15	16	17	18	19	20	21	22	23	24	25	26	27	28	29	30	31	32	33	34	35	36	37	38	39	40	41	42
Ground	A	H	A	H	A	H	A	H	A	H	H	A	H	A	H	A	H	A	H	A	H	A	H	A	H	A	A	H	A	H	H	A	H	A	H	A	H	A	H	A	H	A
Result	D	L	W	W	L	L	W	L	W	W	L	L	D	W	W	D	W	D	W	L	L	L	W	L	D	W	W	D	W	D	D	D	D	L	W	L	W	D	W	D	W	L
Position	11	18	10	6	9	14	10	13	7	6	8	11	13	10	7	8	5	5	5	6	9	12	6	6	9	6	5	5	5	5	5	5	5	6	5	5	5	5	5	5	4	5

Source: La Liga SmartBank
A = Away; H = Home; W = Win; D = Draw; L = Loss

==== Matches ====
The fixtures were revealed on 4 July 2019.

18 August 2019 1	Girona	1–1	Sporting Gijón	Girona
18:30 CEST (UTC+2)	García 90'	Report	A. García 87'	Stadium: Montilivi; Attendance: 8,156; Referee: Daniel Jesús Trujillo Suárez

23 August 2019 2	Albacete	1–0	Girona	Albacete
22:00 CEST (UTC+2)	Alcalá 81' (o.g.)	Report		Stadium: Carlos Belmonte; Attendance: 7,595; Referee: Santiago Varón Aceitón

1 September 2019 3	Girona	1–0	Málaga	Girona
19:00 CEST (UTC+2)	Stuani 30'	Report		Stadium: Montilivi; Referee: Juan Luis Pulido Santana

8 September 2019 4	Girona	3–1	Rayo Vallecano	Girona
16:00 CEST (UTC+2)	Marc Gual (yellow card) 17'; Stuani 28' 57' (pen.) 89'	Summary	Catena (yellow card) 55'; Adri Embarba 73'; Luna (yellow card) 76'; Piovaccari (yellow card) 78'; Ulloa (yellow card) 81'	Stadium: Montilivi; Attendance: 8,372; Referee: (Spain) Gorka Sagues

14 September 2019 5	Cádiz	2–0	Girona	Cádiz
20:30 CEST (UTC+2)	Alcalá 31' (o.g.); Álex 90+5'	Report		Stadium: Ramón de Carranza; Attendance: 15,597; Referee: Daniel Ocón Arráiz

17 September 2019 6	Almería	3–1	Girona	Almería
19:00 CEST (UTC+2)		Report		Stadium: Juegos Mediterráneos

22 September 2019 7	Girona	1–0	Las Palmas	Girona
16:00 CEST (UTC+2)		Report		Stadium: Montilivi

28 September 2019 8	Huesca	1–0	Girona	Huesca
18:00 CEST (UTC+2)		Report		Stadium: El Alcoraz

3 October 2019 9	Girona	3–1	Deportivo La Coruña	Girona
21:00 CEST (UTC+2)		Report		Stadium: Montilivi

6 October 2019 10	Racing Santander	0–3	Girona	Santander
20:30 CEST (UTC+2)	Mario Ortiz (yellow card) 12'; Barral (yellow card) 80'	Report	Stuani 5', (yellow card) 81'; Juan Carlos (yellow card) 42'; Gumbau (yellow card) 43', (goal) 70'; Alcalá (yellow card) 58'; Granell 86'; Juanpe (yellow card) 90+4'	Stadium: El Sardinero; Attendance: 12,104; Referee: Dámaso Arcediano Monescillo

12 October 2019 11	Girona	0–2	Elche	Girona
12:00 CEST (UTC+2)		Report		Stadium: Montilivi

20 October 2019 12	Oviedo	4–2	Girona	Oviedo
18:00 CEST (UTC+2)		Report		Stadium: Carlos Tartiere

27 October 2019 13	Girona	0–0	Alcorcón	Girona
12:00 CET (UTC+1)		Report		Stadium: Montilivi

3 November 2019 14	Extremadura	1–3	Girona	Almendralejo
12:00 CET (UTC+1)		Report		Stadium: Ciudad de Almendralejo

8 November 2019 15	Girona	1–0	Tenerife	Girona
12:00 CET (UTC+1)		Report		Stadium: Montilivi

17 November 2019 16	Ponferradina	1–1	Girona	Ponferrada
12:00 CET (UTC+1)		Report		Stadium: El Toralín

24 November 2019 17	Girona	2–0	Fuenlabrada	Girona
18:00 CET (UTC+1)		Report		Stadium: Montilivi

30 November 2019 18	Zaragoza	3–3	Girona	Zaragoza
21:00 CET (UTC+1)	Suárez (yellow card) 30', (goal) 38', 80' (pen.); Puado 50'; Guti (yellow card) 82'	Report	García 20', 28'; Granell (yellow card) 26'; Gallar (yellow card) 33'; Stuani 87' (pen.); Alcalá (yellow card) 90+2'	Stadium: La Romareda; Attendance: 19,382; Referee: Miguel Ángel Ortiz Arias

8 December 2019 19	Girona	3–1	Lugo	Girona
12:00 CET (UTC+1)		Report		Stadium: Montilivi

13 December 2019 20	Numancia	2–0	Girona	Soria
21:00 CET (UTC+1)		Report		Stadium: Los Pajaritos

22 December 2019 21	Girona	0–3	Mirandés	Girona
20:00 CET (UTC+1)		Report		Stadium: Montilivi

5 January 2020 22	Rayo Vallecano	1–0	Girona	Madrid
16:00 CET (UTC+1)		Report		Stadium: Vallecas

16 January 2020 23	Girona	3–1	Extremadura	Girona
20:00 CET (UTC+1)		Report		Stadium: Montilivi

19 January 2020 24	Tenerife	1–0	Girona	Santa Cruz de Tenerife
20:30 CET (UTC+1)		Report		Stadium: Heliodoro Rodríguez López

26 January 2020 25	Girona	1–1	Oviedo	Girona
20:30 CET (UTC+1)		Report		Stadium: Montilivi

2 February 2020 26	Fuenlabrada	0–1	Girona	Fuenlabrada
12:00 CET (UTC+1)		Report		Stadium: Fernando Torres

8 February 2020 27	Girona	1–0	Huesca	Girona
16:00 CET (UTC+1)		Report		Stadium: Montilivi

14 February 2020 28	Deportivo La Coruña	2–2	Girona	A Coruña
21:00 CET (UTC+1)		Report		Stadium: Abanca-Riazor

22 February 2020 29	Girona	2–0	Ponferradina	Girona
18:15 CET (UTC+1)		Report		Stadium: Montilivi

1 March 2020 30	Mirandés	1–1	Girona	Miranda de Ebro
12:00 CET (UTC+1)		Report		Stadium: Anduva

7 March 2020 31	Girona	1–1	Albacete	Girona
16:00 CET (UTC+1)		Report		Stadium: Montilivi

13 June 2020 32	Las Palmas	0–0	Girona	Las Palmas
19:30 CEST (UTC+2)		Report		Stadium: Gran Canaria; Attendance: 0

16 June 2020 33	Girona	0–0	Racing Santander	Girona
21:45 CEST (UTC+2)		Report		Stadium: Montilivi; Attendance: 0 Referee: Daniel Jesús Trujillo Suárez

19 June 2020 34	Elche	1–0	Girona	Elche
19:30 CEST (UTC+2)		Report		Stadium: Martínez Valero; Attendance: 0 Referee: Álvaro Moreno Aragón

24 June 2020 35	Girona	2–0	Numancia	Girona
19:30 CEST (UTC+2)		Report		Stadium: Montilivi; Attendance: 0 Referee: Santiago Varón Aceitón

28 June 2020 36	Málaga	2–0	Girona	Málaga
19:30 CEST (UTC+2)	Cifu 20', (yellow card) 82'; González (yellow card) 43'; Sadiku 50', (yellow card) 84'; Bare (yellow card) 53'; Adrián (red card) 74'; Buenacasa (yellow card) 90+2'; Benkhemassa (yellow card) 90+4'	Report	Rivera (red card) 22'; Granell (yellow card) 43'; Juanpe (yellow card) 86'	Stadium: La Rosaleda; Attendance: 0 Referee: Alejandro Muñiz Ruiz

3 July 2020 37	Girona	1–0	Zaragoza	Girona
19:30 CEST (UTC+2)	Aday (yellow card) 6'; Miquel (yellow card) 8'; Stuani 57' (pen.); Gumbau (yellow card) 79'; Gallar (yellow card) 90+7'	Report	Torres (yellow card) 37'; Suárez (yellow card) 90+4'	Stadium: Estadi Montilivi; Attendance: 0 Referee: Luis Mario Milla Alvendiz

6 July 2020 38	Sporting Gijón	0–0	Girona	Gijón
19:30 CEST (UTC+2)	Fuego (yellow card) 26'; Valiente (yellow card) 45+1'	Report		Stadium: El Molinón; Attendance: 0 Referee: Aitor Gorostegui Fernández-Ortega

9 July 2020 39	Girona	1–0	Almería	Girona
21:45 CEST (UTC+2)	Juanpe (yellow card) 43'; Stuani 77' (pen.); Calavera (yellow card) 90+1'	Report	Martos (yellow card) 44'; Costas (yellow card) 75'; Ozornwafor (red card) 90+1'	Stadium: Estadi Montilivi; Attendance: 0 Referee: Óliver de la Fuente Ramos

12 July 2020 40	Lugo	2–2	Girona	Lugo
19:30 CEST (UTC+2)	Iriome 18'; Rahmani (yellow card) 30'; Seoane (yellow card) 65'; Kravets (yellow card) 90+3'; Herrera 90+6'	Report	Stuani 31' (pen.); Calavera (yellow card) 36'; Aday 72'; Miquel (yellow card) 84'	Stadium: Estadio Anxo Carro; Attendance: 0 Referee: Saúl Ais Reig

17 July 2020 41	Girona	2–1	Cádiz	Girona
21:00 CEST (UTC+2)	Stuani 22', 59' (pen.)	Report	Álex 84' (pen.)	Stadium: Estadi Montilivi; Attendance: 0 Referee: Alejandro Muñiz Ruiz

20 July 2020 42	Alcorcón	2–0	Girona	Alcorcón
21:00 CEST (UTC+2)	Sosa 56' (pen.); Arribas 74'	Report		Stadium: Santo Domingo; Attendance: 0 Referee: Juan Luis Pulido Santana

==== Play-offs ====
13 August 2020 SF First leg	Girona	1–0	Almería	Girona
19:30 CEST (UTC+2)	Stuani 54'; Miquel (yellow card) 68'; Mojica (yellow card) 89'	Report	Costas (yellow card) 51'; Petrović (yellow card) 67'	Stadium: Estadi Montilivi; Attendance: 0 Referee: Javier Iglesias Villanueva

16 August 2020 SF Second leg	Almería	1–2 (1–3 agg.)	Girona	Almería
19:00 CEST (UTC+2)	Lazo 26'; Vada (yellow card) 33'	Report	Sáiz 4', (yellow card) 27'; García (yellow card) 33'; Jairo (yellow card) 40'; Gumbau (yellow card) 43'; Miquel (yellow card) 57'; Stuani 84'	Stadium: Juegos Mediterráneos; Attendance: 0 Referee: Dámaso Arcediano Monescillo

20 August 2020 F First leg	Elche	0–0	Girona	Elche
22:00 CEST (UTC+2)		Report	Ramalho (yellow card) 7'; Juanpe (yellow card) 45+2'	Stadium: Estadio Manuel Martínez Valero; Attendance: 0 Referee: Dámaso Arcediano Monescillo

23 August 2020 F Second leg	Girona	0–1 (0–1 agg.)	Elche	Girona
22:00 CEST (UTC+2)	Stuani (red card) 61'; Granell (yellow card) 85'	Report	Jonathas (yellow card) 22'; Sánchez (yellow card) 41'; Rodríguez (yellow card) 84'; Milla (yellow card) 85', (goal) 90+6'	Stadium: Estadi Montilivi; Attendance: 0 Referee: José Antonio López Toca

=== Copa del Rey ===
19 December 2019 First round	Linares	1–2	Girona	Linares
21:00 CET (UTC+1)	Lara 13'	Report	Gual 49', 73'	Stadium: Linarejos; Attendance: 3,000; Referee: Dámaso Arcediano Monescillo

11 January 2020 Second round	Cartagena	2–4 (a.e.t.)	Girona	Cartagena
19:00 CET (UTC+1)	Martín 71'; José Ángel 75'	Report	Soriano 28', 112'; Miquel 90+4'; Martínez 115'	Stadium: Cartagonova; Attendance: 6,000; Referee: Isidro Díaz de Mera Escuderos

22 January 2020 Round of 32	Girona	0–3	Villarreal	Girona
21:00 CET (UTC+1)	Bigas (yellow card) 54'; Gumbau (yellow card) 89'	Report	Peña (yellow card) 53'; Funes Mori 54'; Quintillà (yellow card) 67'; Cazorla 70'; Chukwueze 72'	Stadium: Montilivi; Attendance: 928; Referee: Guillermo Cuadra Fernández
