= Sebas Coris =

Spanish footballer

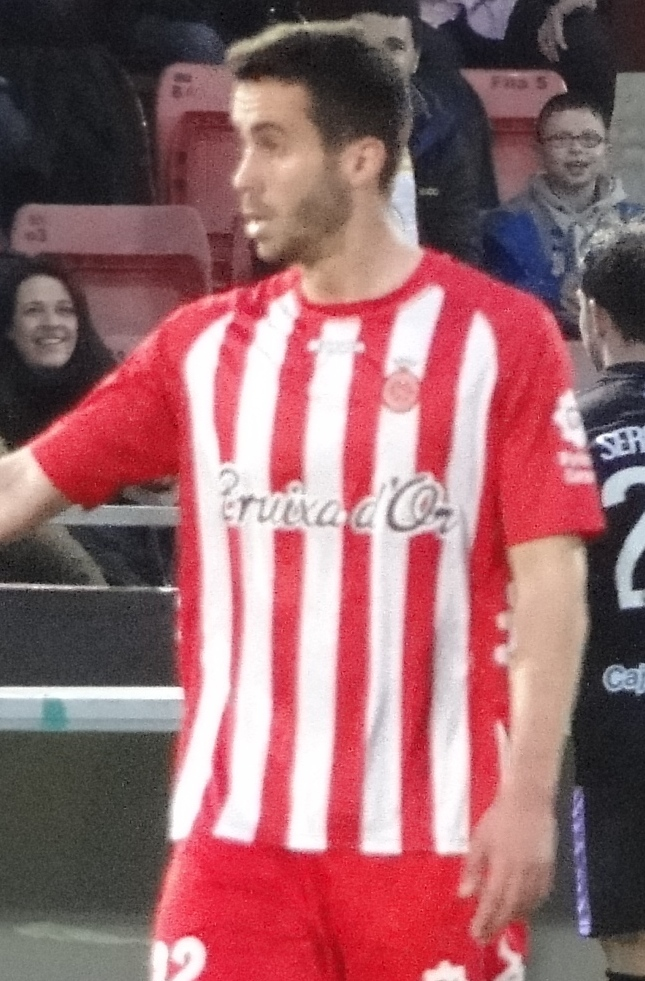
- Coris with Girona in 2015

Personal information
- Full name: Sebastián Coris Cardeñosa
- Date of birth: 31 May 1993 (age 33)
- Place of birth: Tossa de Mar, Spain
- Height: 1.82 m (6 ft 0 in)
- Position: Winger

Youth career
- 2002–2009: Tossa
- 2009–2011: Lloret
- 2011–2012: Girona

Senior career*
Years	Team	Apps	(Gls)
2012–2014	Girona B	56	(7)
2013–2020	Girona	70	(1)
2017–2018	→ Osasuna (loan)	26	(2)
2018–2019	→ Gimnàstic (loan)	17	(0)
2020	Oviedo	7	(0)
2020–2022	Extremadura	18	(0)
2022	Costa Brava	13	(0)
2022–2023	Olot	14	(1)
- * Club domestic league appearances and goals as of 19 February 2023

Sebastián 'Sebas' Coris Cardeñosa (born 31 May 1993) is a Spanish professional footballer. Mainly a right winger, he can also play as a right back.

== Club career ==
Born in Tossa de Mar, Girona, Catalonia, Coris began his career on hometown's club UE Tossa. After two years with local CF Lloret, he finished his formation in 2012 at Girona FC.

Coris made his senior debuts with the reserves in the regional leagues, in the 2012–13 campaign. On 17 December 2013, he played his first match as a professional, coming on as a late substitute in a Copa del Rey 1–4 loss at Getafe CF.

On 14 August 2014, Coris renewed his link with the club, running until 2016. He made his Segunda División debut on 6 September, again from the bench in a 2–0 home win against CD Tenerife.

On 22 November 2014, Coris further extended his contract, signing until 2018 and being awarded a place with the first team in the following campaign. He scored his first professional goal on 5 February 2017, netting the first in a 2–1 home win against Real Valladolid.

Coris contributed with 27 appearances during the 2016–17 campaign, as his side achieved promotion to La Liga for the first time ever. On 30 June 2017, he was loaned to CA Osasuna, freshly relegated to the second tier, on a one-year deal.

On 10 August 2018, Coris was loaned to Gimnàstic de Tarragona in the second division, for the season. On January 31, 2020 Real Oviedo signed Coris, who previously terminated his contract with Girona. On February 6 he was officially presented as a Real Oviedo player signing the contract until June 30, 2020. Returning to Girona for 2019–20, he failed to make a league appearance before cutting ties with the club on 31 January 2020; just hours later, he agreed to a short-term deal with Real Oviedo.

In October 2020, Coris moved to Extremadura UD on a deal until June 2022.

== Career statistics ==
=== Club ===
As of match played 21 March 2021

Appearances and goals by club, season and competition
Club	Season	League			National Cup		Other		Total	
Club	Season	Division	Apps	Goals	Apps	Goals	Apps	Goals	Apps	Goals
Girona	2013–14	Segunda División	0	0	1	0	—		0	0
Girona	2014–15	Segunda División	26	0	2	0	1 (Note: Appearance(s) in Promotion Playoffs)	0	0	0
Girona	2015–16	Segunda División	17	0	1	0	0	0	0	0
Girona	2016–17	Segunda División	27	1	1	0	—		0	0
Girona	2019–20	Segunda División	0	0	3	0	—		0	0
Girona	Total		70	1	8	0	1	0	79	1
Osasuna (loan)	2017–18	Segunda División	26	2	2	0	—		28	2
Gimnàstic (loan)	2018–19	Segunda División	17	0	0	0	—		17	0
Oviedo	2019–20	Segunda División	7	0	0	0	—		7	0
Extremadura	2020–21	Segunda División B	14	0	1	0	—		15	0
Career total			134	3	11	0	1	0	146	3
