= David Serrano =

David Serrano may refer to:

- David Serrano (footballer)
- David Serrano (badminton)
- David Serrano (filmmaker)
