= Jaime Mata =

Spanish footballer

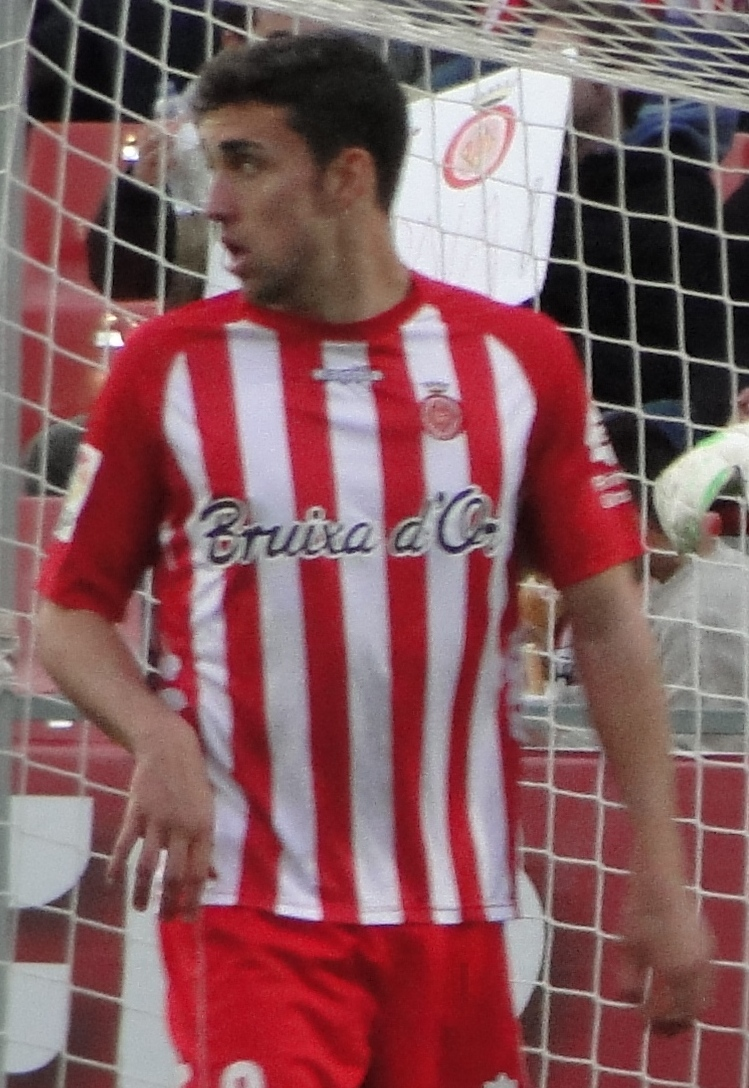
- Mata with Girona in 2015

Personal information
- Full name: Jaime Mata Arnaiz
- Date of birth: 24 October 1988 (age 38)
- Place of birth: Madrid, Spain
- Height: 1.85 m (6 ft 1 in)
- Positions: Striker; winger

Youth career
- 1998–2000: Tres Cantos
- 2000–2007: Galáctico Pegaso

Senior career*
Years	Team	Apps	(Gls)
2007–2008	Pegaso B		
2008–2010	Galáctico Pegaso	42	(17)
2010–2012	Rayo Vallecano B	37	(9)
2010	→ Socuéllamos (loan)	20	(9)
2010–2011	→ Móstoles (loan)	37	(25)
2012–2014	Lleida Esportiu	70	(29)
2014–2016	Girona	76	(19)
2016–2018	Valladolid	67	(38)
2018–2024	Getafe	176	(37)
2024–2025	Las Palmas	33	(0)
2026	Racing Santander	8	(1)

International career
2019	Spain	1	(0)
- * Club domestic league appearances and goals as of 07:39, 5 June 2026 (UTC)

Jaime Mata Arnaiz (born 24 October 1988) is a Spanish professional footballer who plays as a striker or a winger.

== Club career ==
=== Early years ===
Born in Madrid, Mata finished his youth career with local Galáctico Pegaso, making his senior debut with the reserves in 2007. After appearing with the main squad in the Tercera División, he moved to neighbouring Rayo Vallecano in December 2009, being immediately loaned to UD Socuéllamos in the same level.

Mata was subsequently loaned to CD Móstoles of the same league in August 2010, in a season-long deal. He returned to Rayo in summer 2011, being assigned to the B team in the Segunda División B.

On 5 July 2012, Mata signed for fellow third-division Lleida Esportiu.

=== Girona ===
After scoring 32 goals over two seasons, Mata moved to Segunda División after agreeing to a two-year deal with Girona FC on 18 June 2014. He played his first match as a professional on 24 August 2014, starting in a 1–0 home win against Racing de Santander. He scored his first goal six days later, the winner in a 2–1 away victory over AD Alcorcón.

On 11 June 2015, in the first leg of the promotion playoffs' semi-finals, Mata scored a brace in a 3–0 away defeat of Real Zaragoza.

=== Valladolid ===
On 30 June 2016, after again being knocked out in the playoffs, Mata signed a two-year contract with Real Valladolid also of the second tier. He scored a career-best 35 goals in his second season at the Estadio José Zorrilla, notably netting a hat-trick in a 5–1 away rout of Lorca FC on 19 May 2018.

=== Getafe ===
On 2 July 2018, Mata signed a three-year contract with La Liga club Getafe CF as a free agent, making his debut in the competition on 24 August at the age of 29 years and ten months in a 2–0 home win against SD Eibar where he played 79 minutes. He scored his first top-flight goal on 1 October 2018, the equaliser in a 1–1 away draw with RC Celta de Vigo.

In the following year, Mata scored braces against Deportivo Alavés, Celta and SD Huesca, being also named the competition's best player for the month of February. On 17 October 2020, he scored a penalty in a 1–0 victory over FC Barcelona, the club's first against that opponent since 2011. He totalled 14 league goals in his first season and 11 in the second, but featured more often than not as a winger in his later years; after manager José Bordalás' departure in May 2021 and until his return in April 2023, he struggled to get playing time.

=== Later career ===
On 27 June 2024, the 35-year-old Mata signed a one-year contract with UD Las Palmas also in the top tier. He scored his only goals of the season on 31 October, managing four in a 7–0 away demolition of amateurs Ontiñena CF in the first round of the Copa del Rey.

Mata severed his ties in December 2025, in spite of having a one-year extension activated in June that year. On 9 February 2026, he joined Racing de Santander on a short-term deal.

== International career ==
On 15 March 2019, Mata was called up by Spain national team manager Luis Enrique for two UEFA Euro 2020 qualifying matches against Norway and Malta. He won his first cap against the former, after coming on as an 89th-minute substitute for Álvaro Morata in the 2–1 win in Valencia.

== Career statistics ==
=== Club ===
As of match played 31 May 2026

Appearances and goals by club, season and competition
Club	Season	League			Copa del Rey		Continental		Other		Total	
Club	Season	Division	Apps	Goals	Apps	Goals	Apps	Goals	Apps	Goals	Apps	Goals
Rayo Vallecano B	2011–12	Segunda División B	37	9	—		—		—		37	9
Lleida Esportiu	2012–13	Segunda División B	34	14	0	0	—		4 (Note: Appearances in promotion playoffs)	3	38	17
Lleida Esportiu	2013–14	Segunda División B	36	15	4	2	—		4	0	44	17
Lleida Esportiu	Total		70	29	4	2	—		8	3	82	31
Girona	2014–15	Segunda División	38	10	1	0	—		2	2	41	12
Girona	2015–16	Segunda División	38	9	0	0	—		3	0	41	9
Girona	Total		76	19	1	0	—		5	2	82	21
Valladolid	2016–17	Segunda División	28	5	3	1	—		—		31	6
Valladolid	2017–18	Segunda División	39	33	2	0	—		4	2	45	35
Valladolid	Total		67	38	5	1	—		4	2	76	41
Getafe	2018–19	La Liga	34	14	4	2	—		—		38	16
Getafe	2019–20	La Liga	34	11	0	0	7 (Note: Appearances in UEFA Europa League)	3	—		41	14
Getafe	2020–21	La Liga	33	5	2	0	—		—		35	5
Getafe	2021–22	La Liga	22	1	2	3	—		—		24	4
Getafe	2022–23	La Liga	18	1	2	0	—		—		20	1
Getafe	2023–24	La Liga	35	5	3	1	—		—		38	6
Getafe	Total		176	37	13	6	7	3	—		196	46
Las Palmas	2024–25	La Liga	30	0	3	4	—		—		33	4
Las Palmas	2025–26	Segunda División	3	0	1	0	—		—		4	0
Las Palmas	Total		33	0	4	4	—		—		37	4
Racing Santander	2025–26	Segunda División	8	1	0	0	—		—		8	1
Career total			467	133	27	13	7	3	17	7	518	156

=== International ===
Appearances and goals by national team and year
National team	Year	Apps	Goals
Spain	2019	1	0
Total		1	0

== Honours ==
Racing Santander

- Segunda División: 2025–26

Individual

- La Liga Player of the Month: February 2019
- Segunda División top scorer: 2017–18
- Segunda División Player of the Month: September 2017
