= 2016–17 Real Valladolid season =

Real Valladolid
2016–17 season
- President: Carlos Suárez
- Head coach: Paco Herrera
- Stadium: José Zorrilla
- Segunda División: 7th
Home colours	Away colours

The 2016–17 season was the 89th season in Real Valladolid ’s history.

== Squad ==
As of 1 February 2017.

Note: Flags indicate national team as defined under FIFA eligibility rules; some limited exceptions apply. Players may hold more than one non-FIFA nationality.

No.	Pos.	Nation	Player
1	GK	ESP	Pau Torres
3	DF	ESP	Ángel
4	MF	ESP	Álex López (on loan from Celta)
5	DF	CHI	Igor Lichnovsky (on loan from Porto)
6	DF	ARG	Luciano Balbi
7	MF	ESP	Juan Villar
8	MF	POR	André Leão (3rd captain)
9	FW	ESP	Jaime Mata
10	MF	ESP	Sergio Marcos
11	MF	ESP	Guzmán Casaseca
13	GK	ESP	Isaac Becerra
15	DF	ESP	Rafa (Captain)

No.	Pos.	Nation	Player
17	DF	ESP	Javi Moyano (2nd captain)
18	MF	ARG	Cristian Espinoza (on loan from Villarreal)
19	MF	ESP	Joan Jordán (on loan from Espanyol)
20	DF	ESP	Alberto Guitián
21	MF	ESP	Míchel
22	DF	ESP	Markel Etxeberria (on loan from Athletic Bilbao)
23	MF	SRB	Dejan Dražić (on loan from Celta)
24	DF	ESP	Álex Pérez
26	MF	VEN	Renzo Zambrano
27	MF	ESP	Anuar
29	MF	ESP	José Arnaiz
47	FW	ESP	Raúl de Tomás (on loan from Real Madrid)

== Competitions ==
=== Overall ===
Competition	Final position
Segunda División	7th
Copa del Rey	Round of 32

=== Liga ===
==== League table ====
Pos	Team	Pld	W	D	L	GF	GA	GD	Pts	Promotion, qualification or relegation
5	Cádiz	42	16	16	10	55	40	+15	64	Qualification to promotion play-offs
6	Huesca	42	16	15	11	53	43	+10	63 (Note: Huesca finished ahead of Valladolid on head-to-head points: Valladolid 1–2 Huesca, Huesca 1–0 Valladolid)	Qualification to promotion play-offs
7	Valladolid	42	18	9	15	52	47	+5	63	
8	Oviedo	42	17	10	15	47	47	0	61	
9	Lugo	42	14	13	15	49	52	−3	55 (Note: Lugo and Córdoba finished ahead of Reus on head-to-head points: Lugo 7 pts, Córdoba 7 pts, Reus 3 pts. Lugo finished ahead of Córdoba on head-to-head points: Córdoba 3–3 Lugo, Lugo 1–0 Córdoba)	

Source: La Liga
Rules for classification: 1) points; 2) head-to-head points; 3) head-to-head goal difference; 4) goal difference; 5) number of goals scored
