= Diego Martín Caballero =

Uruguayan footballer (born 1991)

Personal information
- Full name: Diego Martín Caballero Manzanares
- Date of birth: 13 June 1991 (age 35)
- Place of birth: Montevideo, Uruguay
- Height: 1.73 m (5 ft 8 in)
- Position: Left back

Team information
- Current team: Mons Calpe
- Number: 11

Youth career
- 2003–2012: Nueva Chicago

Senior career*
Years	Team	Apps	(Gls)
2012–2015	Nueva Chicago	53	(0)
2016	Girona B	14	(0)
2016–2017	1.FC Heiningen	3	(0)
2017	Racing Carhué	10	
2017	Sant Rafel	0	(0)
2017–2018	Castenaso	8	
2018	Casalecchio	16	(5)
2018	Vélez	0	(0)
2018–2019	Tàrrega	19	(0)
2020	Tàrrega		
2020–	Mons Calpe	20	(0)
- * Club domestic league appearances and goals as of 24 October 2021

Diego Martín Caballero Manzanares (born 13 June 1991) is an Uruguayan professional footballer who plays for Gibraltarian club Mons Calpe. Mainly a left back, he can also play as a defensive midfielder.

== Club career ==
Born in Montevideo, Caballero moved to Argentina at early age and graduated from Nueva Chicago's youth setup. He made his senior debut on 25 May 2012, starting in a 1–1 Primera B Metropolitana home draw against Sarmiento; it was his only appearance of the campaign, which ended in promotion.

On 8 October 2012 Caballero made his professional debut, coming on as a second-half substitute for Agustín Farías in a 1–1 draw at Huracán in the Primera B Nacional. He contributed with 16 appearances as his side was immediately relegated back.

Caballero featured regularly during the club's two consecutive promotions, the last one to the Primera División. He made his debut in the category on 23 March 2015, starting in a 0–1 home loss against San Lorenzo.

On 21 February 2016 Caballero moved abroad, after agreeing to a contract at Spanish Segunda División side Girona FC and being immediately assigned to the reserves in the regional leagues. For the 2016–17 season, he represented Germany's 1.FC Heiningen and Racing Club de Carhué back in his home nation.

On 26 June 2017, Caballero returned to Spain after agreeing to a contract with CF Sant Rafel of the Tercera División. He left the club on 11 September without making a single appearance, and went on to play for Italian sides A.S.D. Atletico Castenaso Van Goof and S.S. Casalecchio 1921.

On 7 July 2018, Caballero was announced at Vélez CF, but he moved to UE Tàrrega on 25 August. He renewed with the latter club on 17 July of the following year, but left the club at the start of new season due to work problems; he eventually returned to Tàrrega in January 2020.
