= Pedro Alcalá =

Spanish footballer (born 1989)

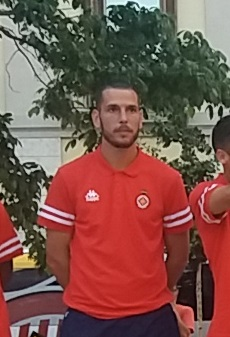
- Alcalá with Girona in 2016

Personal information
- Full name: Pedro Alcalá Guirado
- Date of birth: 19 March 1989 (age 37)
- Place of birth: Mazarrón, Spain
- Height: 1.96 m (6 ft 5 in)
- Position: Centre-back

Youth career
- 2005–2006: Ranero
- 2006–2007: Málaga

Senior career*
Years	Team	Apps	(Gls)
2007	Málaga B	2	(0)
2007–2010	Málaga	1	(0)
2007–2008	→ Alcorcón (loan)	23	(0)
2008–2009	→ Marbella (loan)	33	(2)
2009–2010	→ Real Unión (loan)	15	(0)
2010–2011	Getafe B	29	(2)
2011–2013	Almería B	63	(3)
2013–2014	Murcia	9	(0)
2014–2015	Llagostera	33	(2)
2015–2020	Girona	132	(7)
2020–2021	Cádiz	13	(0)
2021–2025	Cartagena	126	(2)
2026	Gimnàstic	8	(0)

International career
2006	Spain U17	4	(0)
2009	Spain U20	3	(0)
- * Club domestic league appearances and goals as of 10 June 2026

Pedro Alcalá Guirado (born 19 March 1989) is a Spanish professional footballer who plays as a central defender.

== Club career ==
Born in Mazarrón, Region of Murcia, Alcalá was a product of Málaga CF's youth academy. He appeared once for the first team in the 2006–07 season, with the Andalusians in the Segunda División. Subsequently, he spent two years on loan in the Segunda División B, with AD Alcorcón and UD Marbella.

In late August 2009, another season-long loan was arranged as Alcalá joined recently promoted club Real Unión. After being relegated from the second division and having played less than half of the league's matches, his contract with Málaga expired and was not renewed, so the player was released; soon afterwards, he joined Getafe CF's reserves in the third tier.

Alcalá signed with UD Almería's B team in the summer of 2011, again as a free agent. The following week, he was called to the main squad for preseason.

In July 2013, Alcalá moved to division two side Real Murcia CF. Exactly one year later, having featured sparingly in his only season, he joined UE Llagostera.

On 30 August 2015, Alcalá signed for Girona FC in the same league after agreeing to a four-year deal. He was an undisputed starter the following campaigns, achieving promotion to La Liga in 2017.

Alcalá made his debut in the top flight on 19 August 2017, starting in a 2–2 home draw against Atlético Madrid. He scored his first goal in the competition seven days later, the game's only in a home victory over Málaga CF.

On 5 October 2020, Alcalá signed a two-year deal with top-tier Cádiz CF after terminating his contract with Girona. The following 13 August, he moved to second division side FC Cartagena on a contract of the same duration.

Alcalá joined Primera Federación club Gimnàstic de Tarragona on 30 January 2026.

== Career statistics ==
As of match played 21 May 2021

Appearances and goals by club, season and competition
Club	Season	League			National Cup		Other		Total	
Club	Season	Division	Apps	Goals	Apps	Goals	Apps	Goals	Apps	Goals
Málaga B	2006–07	Segunda División B	2	0	—		—		2	0
Málaga	2006–07	Segunda División	1	0	0	0	—		1	0
Alcorcón (loan)	2007–08	Segunda División B	23	0	0	0	—		23	0
Marbella (loan)	2008–09	Segunda División B	32	2	0	0	1 (Note: Appearance in Segunda División B play-offs)	0	33	2
Real Unión (loan)	2009–10	Segunda División	15	0	1	0	—		16	0
Getafe B	2010–11	Segunda División B	29	2	—		—		29	2
Almería B	2011–12	Segunda División B	29	2	—		—		29	2
Almería B	2012–13	Segunda División B	34	1	—		—		34	1
Almería B	Total		63	3	0	0	0	0	63	3
Murcia	2013–14	Segunda División	9	0	1	0	—		10	0
Llagostera	2014–15	Segunda División	33	2	0	0	—		33	2
Llagostera	2015–16	Segunda División	0	0	0	0	—		0	0
Llagostera	Total		33	2	0	0	0	0	33	2
Girona	2015–16	Segunda División	32	1	1	0	2 (Note: Appearances in La Liga play-offs)	0	35	1
Girona	2016–17	Segunda División	39	4	1	0	—		40	4
Girona	2017–18	La Liga	8	1	0	0	—		8	1
Girona	2018–19	La Liga	25	1	4	1	—		29	2
Girona	2019–20	Segunda División	28	0	2	0	1	0	31	0
Girona	2020–21	Segunda División	0	0	0	0	—		0	0
Girona	Total		132	7	8	1	3	0	143	8
Cádiz	2020–21	La Liga	13	0	1	0	—		14	0
Career total			352	16	11	1	4	0	367	17

== Honours ==
Spain U20

- Mediterranean Games: 2009
