= Gerard Bordas =

Spanish footballer (born 1981)

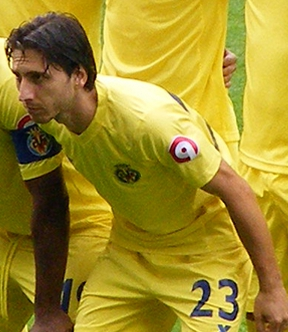
- Bordas lining up for Villarreal in 2011

Personal information
- Full name: Gerard Bordas Bahamontes
- Date of birth: 11 September 1981 (age 45)
- Place of birth: Manresa, Spain
- Height: 1.77 m (5 ft 10 in)
- Positions: Winger; forward

Youth career
- Manresa

Senior career*
| Years | Team | Apps | (Gls) |
| 1999–2001 | Manresa | 34 | (12) |
| 2001–2004 | Terrassa | 28 | (1) |
| 2003 | → Gavà (loan) | 15 | (2) |
| 2003–2004 | → Gimnàstic (loan) | 30 | (1) |
| 2004–2005 | Lorca Deportiva | 29 | (4) |
| 2005–2006 | Terrassa | 7 | (1) |
| 2006–2008 | Gavà | 66 | (18) |
| 2008–2012 | Villarreal B | 105 | (26) |
| 2011–2013 | Villarreal | 8 | (0) |
| 2013 | → Girona (loan) | 17 | (3) |
| 2013–2015 | Girona | 56 | (13) |
| 2015–2016 | Manresa | 5 | (4) |
| Total | | 400 | (85) |
- * Club domestic league appearances and goals

Gerard Bordas Bahamontes (born 11 September 1981 in Manresa, Barcelona, Catalonia) is a Spanish former professional footballer who played as a winger or a forward.
