= David Bigas =

Spanish footballer

Personal information
- Full name: David Bigas Vargas
- Date of birth: 19 June 1994 (age 32)
- Place of birth: Peralada, Spain
- Height: 1.80 m (5 ft 11 in)
- Positions: Left back; winger

Youth career
- 2004–2012: Peralada
- 2012–2013: Girona

Senior career*
Years	Team	Apps	(Gls)
2012	Peralada	0	(0)
2013–2015	Girona B	56	(3)
2014–2015	Girona	2	(0)
2015	→ Sant Andreu (loan)	8	(0)
2015	→ Hospitalet (loan)	6	(1)
2016–2018	Olot	60	(1)
2016	→ Girona B (loan)		
2018–2021	Llagostera	52	(0)
2021–2024	Olot	92	(1)
- * Club domestic league appearances and goals

David Bigas Vargas (born 19 June 1994) is a Spanish former footballer who played as a left back or left winger.

== Club career ==
Born in Peralada, Girona, Catalonia, Bigas was a CF Peralada graduate. He made his senior debuts in January 2012, representing the side in the Primera Catalana. In the 2012 summer, Bigas joined Girona FC, being assigned to the Juvenil squad. He made his debuts with the reserves in the 2013–14 season, in the regional leagues.

On 9 September 2014, he played his first match as a professional, replacing Christian Alfonso in the 99th minute of a 0–0 home draw against CD Tenerife for the season's Copa del Rey. He made his Segunda División debut on 7 December, starting in a 0–1 home loss against FC Barcelona B.

On 26 March 2015, Bigas was loaned to Segunda División B side UE Sant Andreu, until June. On 14 August, he moved to fellow league team CE L'Hospitalet, also in a temporary deal.

On 4 January 2016, Bigas rescinded with the Albirrojos and signed for UE Olot, also in the third division.
