= Albert Vivancos =

Spanish footballer

Vivi
Personal information
- Full name: Albert Vivancos Roig
- Date of birth: 2 February 1994 (age 32)
- Place of birth: Bescanó, Spain
- Height: 1.85 m (6 ft 1 in)
- Position: Midfielder

Team information
- Current team: Olot
- Number: 21

Youth career
- 2002–2013: Girona

Senior career*
Years	Team	Apps	(Gls)
2013–2015	Girona B	26	(0)
2013–2017	Girona	2	(0)
2014–2015	→ Hospitalet (loan)	21	(0)
2016	→ Hércules (loan)	10	(1)
2016–2017	→ Llagostera (loan)	22	(1)
2017–2018	UCAM Murcia	29	(1)
2018–2019	Salamanca UDS	5	(0)
2019–	Olot	44	(0)
- * Club domestic league appearances and goals as of 21:57, 2 October 2019 (UTC)

Albert Vivancos Roig (born 2 February 1994), commonly known as Vivi, is a Spanish footballer who plays for UE Olot as a central midfielder.

== Club career ==
Born in Bescanó, Girona, Catalonia, Vivi graduated with Girona FC's youth setup, and made his debut with the reserves in the regional leagues. He previously had a trial at Queens Park Rangers FC, but the deal collapsed.

On 29 September 2013, Vivi played his first match as a professional, coming on as a late substitute in a 0–2 loss at Córdoba CF. On 20 October of the following year he was loaned to Segunda División B's CE L'Hospitalet.

On 18 August 2015, Vivi was definitely promoted to the main squad, also signing a new three-year deal with the Albirrojos. On 8 January of the following year, after being rarely used, he was loaned to Hércules CF until June.

On 30 August 2016, Vivi was loaned to UE Llagostera in a season-long deal. The following 24 July, he cut ties with Girona and joined UCAM Murcia CF just hours later.
