= Eloi Amagat =

Spanish footballer

Eloi
Personal information
- Full name: Eloi Amagat Arimany
- Date of birth: 21 May 1985 (age 41)
- Place of birth: Girona, Spain
- Height: 1.82 m (6 ft 0 in)
- Position: Attacking midfielder

Youth career
- 1995–2001: Penya Bons Aires
- 2001–2004: Vilobí

Senior career*
Years	Team	Apps	(Gls)
2004–2008	Girona	47	(0)
2004–2005	→ Palafrugell (loan)	8	(1)
2006–2007	→ Gavà (loan)	37	(3)
2008–2009	Lorca Deportiva	19	(2)
2009–2012	Llagostera	90	(21)
2012–2018	Girona	133	(8)
2018	New York City	9	(0)
2019–2023	Olot	115	(5)
Total		458	(40)
- * Club domestic league appearances and goals

Eloi Amagat Arimany (born 21 May 1985), known simply as Eloi, is a Spanish former professional footballer who played as an attacking midfielder.

== Club career ==
=== Girona ===
Born in Girona, Catalonia, Eloi began his career with his hometown side Girona FC, being loaned to neighbouring FC Palafrugell and CF Gavà for two of the following three seasons. In the summer of 2008, after helping his parent club to promote to Segunda División for the first time in 49 years, he joined Lorca Deportiva CF also in the Segunda División B, meeting the opposite fate.

In November 2009, Eloi signed for UE Llagostera in the Tercera División. He scored eight goals in his second year, and his team reached the third tier for the first time ever.

Eloi returned to Girona and division two on 5 July 2012, on a one-year contract with an option to a further season. He made his debut in the competition on 18 August, against neighbours CE Sabadell FC. He scored his first goal in the league the following weekend, playing five minutes and contributing to a 5–1 away rout of CD Guadalajara.

Eloi appeared in 16 matches in the 2016–17 campaign, as the Estadi Montilivi-based club promoted to La Liga for the first time in its history. He made his debut in the Spanish top flight on 16 February 2018 at the age of 32, coming on as a late substitute in the 3–0 home win over CD Leganés.

=== New York City ===
On 25 July 2018, Eloi moved abroad for the first time in his career, joining New York City FC. He made his debut in the Major League Soccer on 22 August, being one of two players sent off for the hosts in a 1–1 home draw with the New York Red Bulls.

=== Later career ===
Eloi returned to his homeland on 31 January 2019, agreeing to a deal at third-division UE Olot.
