= Christian Alfonso =

Spanish footballer

Personal information
- Full name: Christian Alfonso López
- Date of birth: 2 May 1989 (age 37)
- Place of birth: Barcelona, Spain
- Height: 1.83 m (6 ft 0 in)
- Position: Attacking midfielder

Youth career
- La Florida
- Hospitalet
- 2002–2004: Espanyol
- 2004–2008: Hospitalet

Senior career*
Years	Team	Apps	(Gls)
2008–2011	Hospitalet	86	(21)
2011–2012	Espanyol B	21	(12)
2011–2015	Espanyol	18	(0)
2013–2014	→ Alcorcón (loan)	17	(1)
2014–2015	→ Girona (loan)	12	(0)
2016	Hospitalet	15	(3)
2016–2017	Lleida Esportiu	30	(3)
2018–2022	Hospitalet	105	(15)
Total		304	(55)
- * Club domestic league appearances and goals

Christian Alfonso López (born 2 May 1989) is a Spanish former professional footballer who played as an attacking midfielder.

== Club career ==
Born in Barcelona, Catalonia, Alfonso signed with RCD Espanyol in 2002 at the age of 13, from neighbours CE L'Hospitalet. Two years later, he returned to his previous club and made his senior debut there, appearing in two Segunda División B games in the 2007–08 season in an eventual relegation. He was an essential player in the subsequent promotion, then scored ten goals from 30 appearances to help them to retain their status.

Alfonso moved to Espanyol again in late March 2011, alongside teammate Cristian Gómez – the deal being made effective in July – initially being assigned to the reserves. On 2 October 2011, he made his first-team (and La Liga) debut, featuring 16 minutes in a 0–4 home loss against Real Madrid. He scored his only competitive goal on 1 November 2012, but in a 3–1 defeat at Sevilla FC in the round of 32 of the Copa del Rey.

On 15 August 2013, Alfonso joined AD Alcorcón of Segunda División, in a season-long loan deal. He scored his sole goal in the second tier on 1 September, the first in the 3–0 home win over Recreativo de Huelva.

Alfonso was loaned to Girona FC of the same league on 29 August 2014, also in a one-year deal. Roughly a year later, he terminated his contract with Espanyol.
