= David Serrano (footballer) =

Spanish footballer

Personal information
- Full name: David Serrano Molina
- Date of birth: 25 April 1995 (age 31)
- Place of birth: Premià de Mar, Spain
- Height: 1.75 m (5 ft 9 in)
- Position: Winger

Team information
- Current team: Sant Andreu

Youth career
- 2004–2014: Damm

Senior career*
Years	Team	Apps	(Gls)
2014–2015	Martinenc	34	(5)
2015	Girona B	8	(2)
2015–2016	Girona	1	(0)
2016	→ Badalona (loan)	7	(0)
2016–2018	Peralada	30	(4)
2019	Karaiskakis	4	(0)
2019–	Sant Andreu	3	(0)
- * Club domestic league appearances and goals as of 13 October 2019

David Serrano Molina (born 25 April 1995) is a Spanish footballer who plays for UE Sant Andreu as a right winger.

== Club career ==
Born in Premià de Mar, Barcelona, Catalonia, Serrano graduated with CF Damm's youth setup. He made his debuts as a senior with FC Martinenc in the 2014–15 campaign, suffering relegation from Tercera División.

On 23 July 2015, Serrano joined Girona FC, being assigned to the reserves in the regional leagues. He made his first team debut on 9 September, starting in a 2–2 away draw against Gimnàstic de Tarragona, for the season's Copa del Rey (4–5 loss on penalties). A few days later, he made his Segunda División debut as a substitute against SD Huesca, picking up a yellow card in a 0–0 draw.

On 20 January 2016, Serrano was loaned to Segunda División B side CF Badalona until the end of the season. Upon returning, he was assigned to the farm team in the fourth division. On 31 August 2018, he left Girona.

In January 2019, after six months of inactivity, Serrano moved abroad for the first time in his career and joined AE Karaiskakis FC. On 9 August, he returned to his home country after agreeing to a one-year deal with UE Sant Andreu in division four.
