= Felipe Sanchón =

Spanish footballer

Personal information
- Full name: Felipe Sanchón Huerta
- Date of birth: 8 April 1982 (age 44)
- Place of birth: Barcelona, Spain
- Height: 1.64 m (5 ft 4 1/2 in)
- Position: Attacking midfielder

Youth career
- 1990–1992: Collblanc
- 1992–2001: Barcelona

Senior career*
Years	Team	Apps	(Gls)
2000–2004	Barcelona C	75	(9)
2003–2004	Barcelona B	22	(1)
2004–2005	Figueres	14	(0)
2005–2006	Girona	35	(21)
2006–2007	Hospitalet	37	(20)
2007–2009	Aris	30	(3)
2009	→ Girona (loan)	17	(6)
2009–2011	Udinese	0	(0)
2009–2011	→ Granada (loan)	38	(5)
2011	→ Gimnàstic (loan)	18	(4)
2011–2012	Hércules	28	(4)
2012–2017	Girona	124	(28)
2017–2019	Sabadell	56	(11)
2019–2021	Hospitalet	0	(0)
Total		494	(112)
- * Club domestic league appearances and goals

Felipe Sanchón Huerta (born 8 April 1982) is a Spanish former professional footballer who played as an attacking midfielder.

He appeared in 192 Segunda División games over eight seasons, totalling 43 goals for Girona (six years), Granada, Gimnàstic and Hércules.

== Club career ==
Born in Barcelona, Catalonia, Sanchón started his career in FC Barcelona's youth system at the age of 10. Between 2001 and 2004 he represented the club's C and B teams and, during this period, was capped by Spain at youth level.

Unable to carve a niche with the main squad, Sanchón was released and went on to play for Barça neighbours UE Figueres, Girona FC and CE L'Hospitalet. His first taste of top-flight football arrived when he signed for Thessaloniki-based Aris F.C. in July 2007.

In 2009's January transfer window, Sanchón returned to Spain and Girona on a loan until the end of the season. On 11 January, in a Segunda División home game against SD Eibar, he celebrated his debut by scoring in a 2–0 win, netting six times in only 17 matches as the side managed to retain their league status.

On 28 July 2009, Sanchón joined Granada CF, loaned by Udinese Calcio alongside eight other players after a partnership agreement. He contributed 35 appearances and four goals as the Andalusia team returned to the second tier after an absence of 22 years, but in late January 2011 left for another club in that league, Gimnàstic de Tarragona, still owned by the Italians.

Sanchón achieved top-division promotion with Girona at the end of the 2016–17 campaign, but only contributed four matches and one goal to this feat.
