= Kiko (footballer, born 1988) =

Spanish footballer

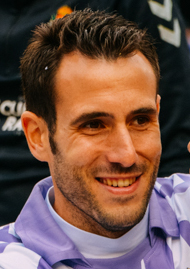
- Kiko with Valladolid in 2019

Personal information
- Full name: Francisco José Olivas Alba
- Date of birth: 21 August 1988 (age 38)
- Place of birth: Antequera, Spain
- Height: 1.84 m (6 ft 0 in)
- Position: Centre-back

Youth career
- Málaga

Senior career*
Years	Team	Apps	(Gls)
2006–2007	Málaga B	12	(0)
2007	Málaga	5	(0)
2007–2012	Villarreal B	141	(4)
2009–2012	Villarreal	6	(0)
2012–2013	Córdoba	29	(0)
2013–2015	Sabadell	73	(6)
2015–2017	Girona	63	(6)
2017–2022	Valladolid	135	(3)
2022–	Cartagena	74	(2)

International career
2009	Spain U21	4	(0)
- * Club domestic league appearances and goals as of 25 June 2025

Francisco José Olivas Alba (born 21 August 1988), known as Kiko, is a Spanish professional footballer who plays as a central defender.

He played 400 Segunda División games over 14 seasons, representing seven clubs mainly Villarreal B and Cartagena (three years apiece). In La Liga, he appeared for the first team of the former and Valladolid.

== Club career ==
Born in Antequera, Province of Málaga, Kiko finished his youth career at local giants Málaga CF, and appeared five times for the first team in the 2006–07 season, whilst the Andalusians were in the Segunda División. In the following summer he signed with Villarreal CF, being one of the reserves' most important defensive members as they reached, for the first time, the country's second tier.

On 30 August 2009, Kiko made his debut for the first team, playing 90 minutes in a 1–1 La Liga draw at CA Osasuna. In his second match, already in 2010, he was sent off after a late tackle on Valencia CF's David Villa – a penalty was also awarded, with the same player scoring – in a 4–1 away defeat.

After being deemed surplus to requirements at Villarreal, Olivas left and signed a two-year deal with division two club Córdoba CF on 3 August 2012. He remained in that league the following years, representing CE Sabadell FC, Girona FC, Real Valladolid and FC Cartagena, achieving top-flight promotion with Girona and Valladolid.
