= Carles Mas =

Spanish footballer (born 1993)

Personal information
- Full name: Carles Mas Bacardit
- Date of birth: 27 February 1993 (age 33)
- Place of birth: Banyoles, Spain
- Height: 1.81 m (5 ft 11 in)
- Position: Centre-back

Youth career
- 2002–2006: Banyoles
- 2006–2012: Girona

Senior career*
Years	Team	Apps	(Gls)
2012–2015	Girona B	29	(1)
2013–2017	Girona	26	(1)
2017	→ Gavà (loan)	12	(1)
2017–2023	Olot	129	(5)
- * Club domestic league appearances and goals as of 18:13, 27 November 2022 (UTC)

Carles Mas Bacardit (born 27 February 1993) is a Spanish professional footballer who plays as a centre-back.

== Club career ==
Born in Banyoles, Girona, Catalonia, Mas graduated from Girona FC's youth setup. He made his senior debuts with the reserves in the regional leagues, in the 2012–13 campaign.

On 8 June 2013, Mas played his first match as a professional, starting in a 1–1 home draw against Real Madrid Castilla in the Segunda División championship. He scored his first professional goal on 17 May 2015, netting the last in a 1–1 home draw against Real Zaragoza.

On 28 August 2015, Mas signed a new one-year deal with the club, after already being a regular member of the first team. On 31 January 2017, after making no appearances during the first half of the campaign, he was loaned to CF Gavà until June.

On 17 June 2017, after Girona's promotion to La Liga, Mas was released and he joined UE Olot ten days later.
