= Richy (footballer) =

Spanish footballer

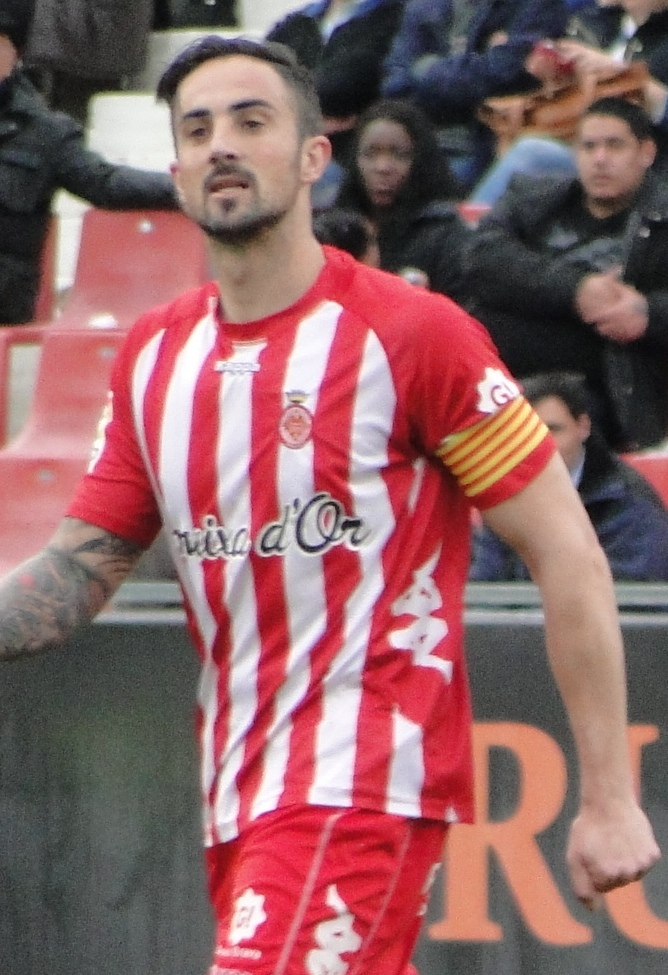
- Richy with Girona in 2015

Personal information
- Full name: Ricardo Álvarez Puig
- Date of birth: 11 September 1984 (age 42)
- Place of birth: Vigo, Spain
- Height: 1.84 m (6 ft 0 in)
- Position: Centre-back

Youth career
- Arosa

Senior career*
Years	Team	Apps	(Gls)
2003–2009	Celta B	158	(15)
2007	Celta	1	(0)
2009–2011	Córdoba	44	(2)
2011–2017	Girona	129	(6)
Total		332	(23)
- * Club domestic league appearances and goals

Ricardo Álvarez Puig (born 11 September 1984), known as Richy, is a Spanish former professional footballer who played as a central defender.

== Club career ==
=== Celta and Córdoba ===
Born in Vigo, Galicia, Richy began his career at hometown club RC Celta de Vigo, playing almost exclusively for their reserves in the Segunda División B. His lone appearance for the first team was on 26 August 2007 on the first day of the Segunda División season, playing the entirety of a 1–1 home draw against Córdoba CF in which he featured as a right-back, and being notified of this by manager Hristo Stoichkov one hour before kick-off.

On 14 July 2009, after helping Celta B to fifth place, Richy signed a one-year contract at Córdoba. He made his debut on 29 August as they began the campaign with a 3–0 loss at neighbours Real Betis, and the following 27 March he was sent off in a 2–0 home win over leaders Real Sociedad.

Richi scored his first two professional goals towards the end of 2010–11, starting with a header to open a 3–0 away defeat of Villarreal CF B on 17 April 2011.

=== Girona ===
On 21 June 2011, Richy turned down a two-year deal at Córdoba to move to Girona FC – also in the second tier – for one year. He made his debut on 26 August in a 1–4 home loss to Elche CF, receiving a red card towards the end; he missed the vast majority of the season, due to an external lateral ligament injury to his right knee.

Richi's first goal for the Catalans came on 16 March 2013, opening their 3–1 win at Recreativo de Huelva. In his fourth year, he netted a career-best four goals and was ever-present until his late dismissal in the penultimate match, a 1–0 away victory against RCD Mallorca.

On 14 June 2017, after achieving promotion to La Liga and following six knee surgeries in only two years, the 32-year-old Richy announced his retirement.
