= Aday Benítez =

Spanish footballer (born 1987)

- Aday with Girona in 2018

Personal information
- Full name: Francisco Aday Benítez Caraballo
- Date of birth: 16 December 1987 (age 38)
- Place of birth: Sentmenat, Spain
- Height: 1.79 m (5 ft 10 1/2 in)
- Position: Winger

Team information
- Current team: Mirandés (manager)

Youth career
- 1993–1998: Sentmenat
- 1998–2004: Granollers
- 2004–2005: Sentmenat
- 2005–2006: Granollers

Senior career*
Years	Team	Apps	(Gls)
2006–2009	Premià		
2009–2011	Sant Andreu	50	(4)
2011–2013	Hospitalet	58	(8)
2013–2014	Tenerife	13	(0)
2014–2021	Girona	185	(7)
Total		306+	(19+)

Managerial career
- 2022–2023: Europa B (assistant)
- 2023–2024: L'Escala
- 2024–2026: Europa
- 2026–: Mirandés
- * Club domestic league appearances and goals

Francisco Aday Benítez Caraballo (born 16 December 1987), known as Aday as a player, is a Spanish former professional footballer who played mainly a winger but also as a full-back. He is currently the manager of the Primera Federación team Mirandés.

He achieved Segunda División figures of 157 games and five goals over six seasons, with Girona (five years) and Tenerife (one). He appeared in La Liga with the first of those clubs.

== Playing career ==
=== Early career ===
Born in Sentmenat, Barcelona, Catalonia, Aday finished his development at local EC Granollers, making his senior debut with neighbouring CE Premià in the Tercera División. He first arrived in the Segunda División B in 2009 when he joined UE Sant Andreu, contributing 25 games and two goals in his first season as the team failed to promote in the play-offs.

Aday signed for CE L'Hospitalet in June 2011. In his second year he scored a career-best seven goals, with the side also being eliminated in post-season play.

=== Tenerife ===
On 5 July 2013, Aday moved to CD Tenerife, recently promoted to Segunda División. He made his debut as a professional on 1 September, playing the last 22 minutes of a 2–0 away loss against CD Mirandés.

=== Girona ===
On 16 July 2014, Aday joined Girona FC in the same league after terminating his contract with the Canarian club. He scored his first goal in the second tier on 4 October, the second in a 3–0 home win over SD Ponferradina after one minute on the pitch.

Aday featured regularly for the Blanquivermells the following campaigns, making 35 appearances in 2016–17 as they achieved promotion to La Liga for the first time ever. He made his debut in the competition on 19 August 2017, starting in the 2–2 home draw against Atlético Madrid.

Aday scored his first goal in the Spanish top flight on 23 October 2017, opening a 2–1 away defeat of Deportivo de La Coruña through a penalty kick. The following 7 February, he extended his contract until 2021.

In March 2023, already retired, Aday revealed that he was offered €50,000 to lose a match against Córdoba CF six years earlier, as Girona had already secured top-division promotion.

== Coaching career ==
Benítez worked as a manager after retiring, his first experiences as a head coach being with FC L'Escala and CE Europa. At the end of the 2024–25 season, he led the latter club to a first-ever promotion to Primera Federación.

In the following campaign, Benítez's team reached the promotion play-offs, being eliminated in the semi-finals by RC Celta Fortuna. On 18 July 2026, he left, and took over fellow third division side CD Mirandés on 19 October.
