= Álex Granell =

Spanish footballer

Àlex Granell
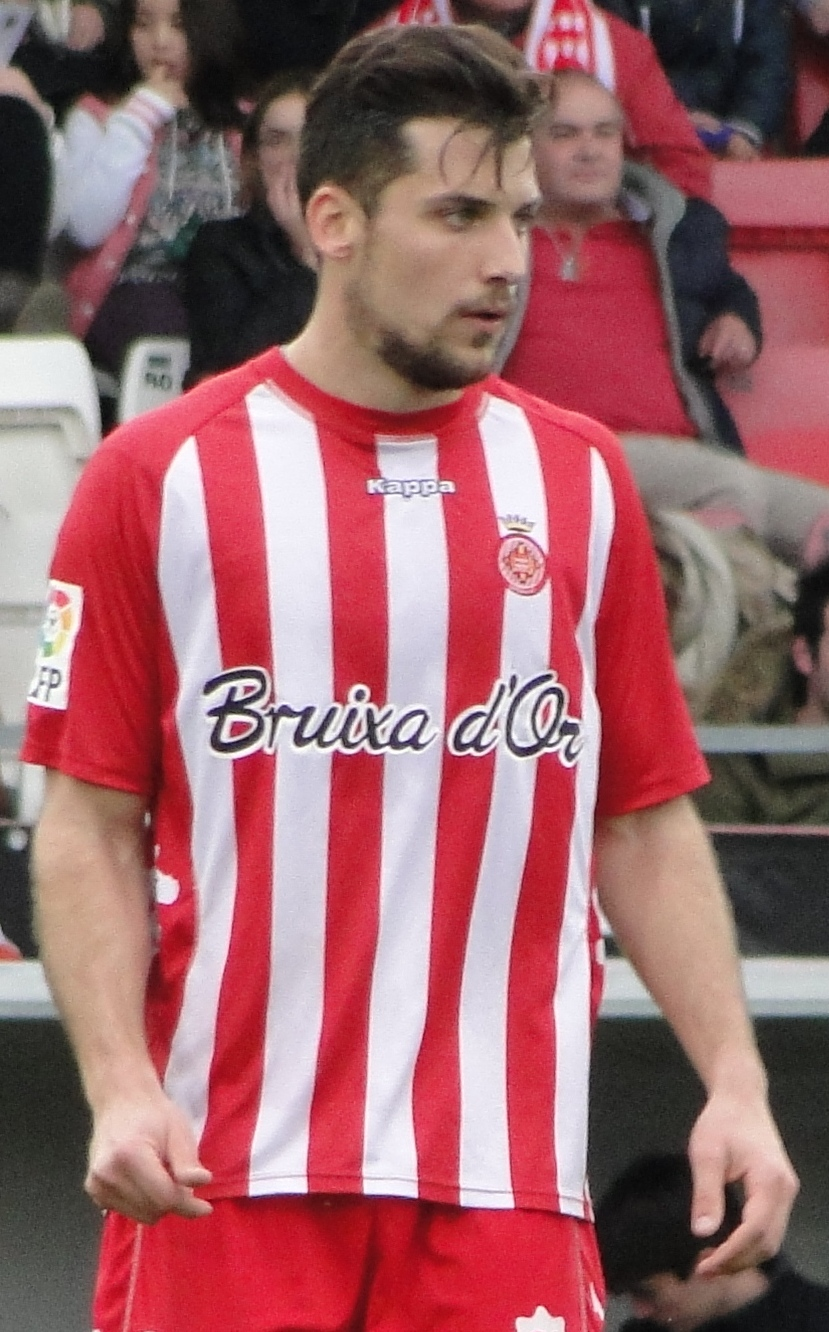
- Granell with Girona in 2015

Personal information
- Full name: Alexandre Granell Nogué
- Date of birth: 2 August 1988 (age 38)
- Place of birth: Olot, Spain
- Height: 1.75 m (5 ft 9 in)
- Position: Midfielder

Team information
- Current team: Bolívar
- Number: 6

Youth career
- 1994–2004: Girona
- 2004–2006: Gironès-Sàbat

Senior career*
Years	Team	Apps	(Gls)
2006–2007	Farners	29	(3)
2007–2008	Palafrugell	27	(0)
2008–2009	Banyoles	34	(4)
2009–2010	Manlleu	36	(6)
2010–2011	Llagostera	34	(3)
2011–2012	Olot	34	(9)
2012	Llagostera	12	(0)
2013	Cádiz	19	(2)
2013–2014	Prat	34	(4)
2014–2020	Girona	217	(14)
2020–2022	Bolívar	54	(3)
2022–2024	Lommel	49	(0)
2024	Bolívar	20	(0)
Total		599	(48)

International career
2019	Catalonia	1	(0)
- * Club domestic league appearances and goals

Alexandre 'Àlex' Granell Nogué (born 2 August 1988) is a Spanish former professional footballer who played as a central midfielder.

He spent the vast majority of his career with Girona, representing the club in both La Liga and Segunda División while appearing in 233 competitive matches and scoring 16 goals.

== Club career ==
=== Early career ===
Born in Olot, Girona, Catalonia, Granell began his career with local amateurs CE Farners, and played in Tercera División the following years, representing CD Banyoles, AEC Manlleu, UE Llagostera and UE Olot, all also from his native region. With the second to last team he achieved promotion in 2011, appearing in 34 matches and scoring three goals.

Granell first arrived in the Segunda División B in 2012, after returning to Llagostera. After starting rarely, however, he moved to Cádiz CF in the same league on 28 December 2012. On 1 August 2013, he signed with AE Prat also in the third tier.

=== Girona ===
On 30 June 2014, Granell joined Segunda División's Girona FC, signing a two-year contract. He made his debut in the competition on 24 August, starting in a 1–0 home win against Racing de Santander.

Granell scored his first professional goal on 23 November 2014, closing the 2–0 home victory over Recreativo de Huelva. In the 2016–17 season, he contributed two goals in 31 appearances as the club achieved promotion to La Liga for the first time ever.

Granell made his debut in the top flight on 19 August 2017, starting in a 2–2 home draw against Atlético Madrid. He scored his only goal in the competition the following 31 March, as the hosts drew 1–1 with Levante UD. During most of his spell, he was team captain and was also in charge of set pieces.

On 15 August 2019, Granell agreed to a new deal through 2022.

=== Bolívar ===
On 6 October 2020, Granell moved abroad for the first time in his career, signing for Club Bolívar of the Bolivian Primera División.
