= Estadi Montilivi =

Multi-use stadium in Girona, Spain

Estadi Municipal de Montilivi
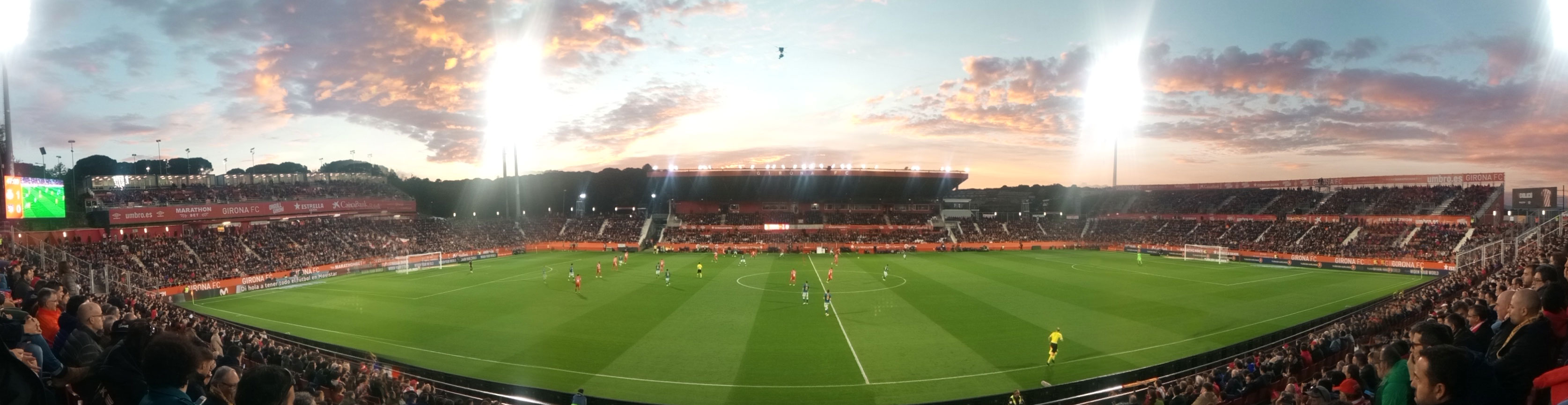
- Interactive map of Estadi Municipal de Montilivi
- Location: Girona, Catalonia, Spain
- Coordinates: 41°57′41″N 2°49′43″E
- Owner: Ajuntament de Girona
- Operator: Ajuntament de Girona
- Capacity: 14,624
- Surface: Natural turf
- Record attendance: 14,158 (Girona v Real Madrid, 31 January 2019)
- Field size: 100 metres (109 yd) x 68 metres (74 yd)

Construction
- Opened: 1970
- Expanded: 2017, 2022

Tenants
- Girona FC (1970–present); Spain national football team (selected matches)

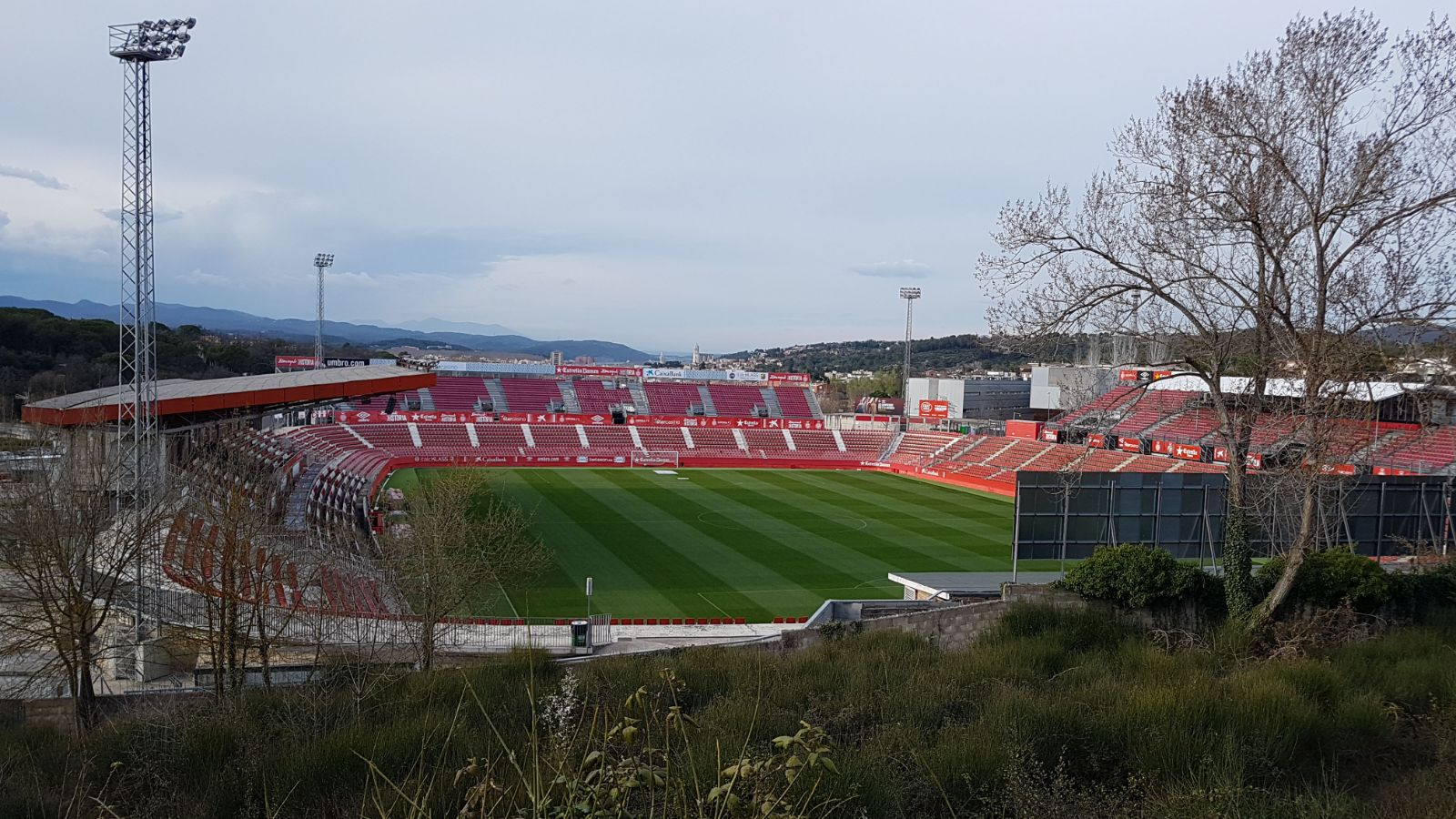
Panoramic view from the Tennis Club

Estadi Montilivi is a multi-use stadium in Girona, Catalonia, Spain. It is used mostly for football matches and serves as the home ground of Girona FC. It was built and opened in 1970. Montilivi has a capacity of 14,624.

== History ==
The side stand of the Montilivi Stadium was completed in June 2010, seven months behind schedule. Since the entrances were still not finished, the stadium was not open for public use in the 2009–10 season. On March 2, 2011, it was able to hold the first match with the side stands, and 9,285 spectators attended.

On March 12, 2012, Girona City Council ceded the field to Girona FC for 30 years, renewable to 50 in total.

After their first ever promotion to La Liga, Girona expanded the stadium for hosting 13,450 spectators. Later, its capacity was reduced to 11,810.

Girona added the Montilivi Stadium to the list of stadia as part of the Iberian candidacy for the 2018 World Cup; however, months before the official list of football stadia that would make up the candidacy was published, Girona FC withdrew it, understanding that it had little chance of being chosen.

== Notable matches ==
Date	Competition	Team	Res	Team
6 September 2018	International friendly	Trinidad and Tobago	2–0	United Arab Emirates
25 March 2019	Unofficial international friendly	Catalonia	2–1	Venezuela
25 May 2022	Unofficial international friendly	Catalonia	6–0	Jamaica
9 November 2022	International friendly	Mexico	4–0	Iraq
16 November 2022	International friendly	Mexico	1–2	Sweden
