= 2014–15 Real Zaragoza season =

Real Zaragoza
2014–15 season
- President: Christian Lapetra
- Head coach: Víctor Muñoz (until 24 November); Ranko Popović (from 24 November)
- Stadium: La Romareda
- Segunda División: 6th
- Play-offs: Runners-up
- Copa del Rey: Second round
- Top goalscorer: League: Borja Bastón (22); All: Borja Bastón (22)
- Average home league attendance: 15,778
Home colours	Away colours	Third colours

The 2014–15 season was the 83rd season in the existence of Real Zaragoza and the club's second consecutive season in the second division of Spanish football. In addition to the domestic league, Real Zaragoza participated in this season's edition of the Copa del Rey.

== Players ==
=== First-team squad ===
Note: Flags indicate national team as defined under FIFA eligibility rules; some limited exceptions apply. Players may hold more than one non-FIFA nationality.

No.	Pos.	Nation	Player
1	GK	ESP	Pablo Alcolea
3	DF	ESP	Mario Álvarez
4	DF	URU	Leandro Cabrera
5	DF	ESP	Rubén González
6	MF	ALB	Vullnet Basha (on loan from Sion)
7	FW	BIH	Eldin Hadžić
8	MF	ESP	Lolo
9	FW	ESP	Borja Bastón (on loan from Atlético Madrid)
10	FW	BRA	Willian José (on loan from Deportivo Maldonado)
11	MF	ESP	Jaime Romero (on loan from Udinese)
13	GK	MAR	Bono (on loan from Atlético Madrid)
15	FW	ESP	Pedro Sánchez
17	DF	ESP	José Manuel Fernández
18	MF	ESP	Albert Dorca

No.	Pos.	Nation	Player
19	MF	ESP	Natxo Insa
20	FW	ESP	Tato
21	MF	ESP	Iñigo Ruiz de Galarreta (on loan from Athletic Club)
23	MF	ESP	Javi Álamo (captain)
26	DF	ESP	Diego Rico
27	MF	ESP	Sergio Gil
28	MF	ESP	Álvaro Tierno
29	FW	ESP	David Muñoz
30	GK	ESP	Óscar Whalley
31	DF	ESP	Jesús Vallejo
32	DF	ESP	Carlos Nieto
35	FW	ESP	Diego Suárez
36	DF	ESP	Álvaro Meseguer
—	FW	ESP	Jorge Ortí

=== Out on loan ===
Note: Flags indicate national team as defined under FIFA eligibility rules; some limited exceptions apply. Players may hold more than one non-FIFA nationality.

No.	Pos.	Nation	Player
—	DF	ESP	Abraham Minero (at Eibar until 30 June 2015)
—	MF	ESP	Adán Pérez (at Racing de Santander until 30 June 2015)
—	FW	ESP	Lucas Porcar (at Sabadell until 30 June 2015)

== Pre-season and friendlies ==
Win Draw Loss

== Competitions ==
=== Overall record ===
Competition	First match	Last match	Starting round	Final position	Record							
Competition	First match	Last match	Starting round	Final position	Pld	W	D	L	GF	GA	GD	Win %
Segunda División	23 August 2014	7 June 2015	Matchday 1	6th	42	15	16	11	61	58	+3	35.71
Segunda División promotion play-offs	11 June 2015	21 June 2015	Semi-finals	Runners-up	4	2	0	2	7	7	+0	50.00
Copa del Rey	10 September 2014		Second round	Second round	1	0	0	1	0	1	−1	0.00
Total					47	17	16	14	68	66	+2	36.17

Source: Soccerway

=== Segunda División ===
==== League table ====
Pos	Team	Pld	W	D	L	GF	GA	GD	Pts	Promotion, qualification or relegation
4	Las Palmas (O, P)	42	22	12	8	73	47	+26	78	Qualification to promotion play-offs
5	Valladolid	42	21	9	12	65	40	+25	72	Qualification to promotion play-offs
6	Zaragoza	42	15	16	11	61	58	+3	61	Qualification to promotion play-offs
7	Ponferradina	42	16	12	14	55	51	+4	60	
8	Mirandés	42	16	11	15	42	44	−2	59	

Source: LFP - Liga Adelante
Rules for classification: 1) points; 2) head-to-head points; 3) head-to-head goal difference; 4) goal difference; 5) number of goals scored
(O) Play-off winners; (P) Promoted

==== Results summary ====
Overall								Home						Away					
Pld	W	D	L	GF	GA	GD	Pts	W	D	L	GF	GA	GD	W	D	L	GF	GA	GD
42	15	16	11	61	58	+3	61	10	7	4	33	20	+13	5	9	7	28	38	−10

Source: La Liga SmartBank

==== Results by round ====
Round	1	2	3	4	5	6	7	8	9	10	11	12	13	14	15	16	17	18	19	20	21	22	23	24	25	26	27	28	29	30	31	32	33	34	35	36	37	38	39	40	41	42
Ground	A	H	A	H	H	A	H	A	H	A	H	A	H	A	H	A	H	A	H	A	H	H	A	H	A	A	H	A	H	A	H	A	H	A	H	A	H	A	H	A	H	A
Result	D	D	L	D	W	W	W	D	W	W	L	L	D	L	W	D	W	D	L	L	W	W	W	W	D	L	D	L	D	W	D	D	D	L	W	D	W	D	L	W	L	D
Position	14	13	18	19	13	10	7	8	7	5	5	7	8	8	6	8	6	7	7	9	7	7	6	6	6	6	6	7	6	6	6	6	6	7	7	6	6	6	6	6	6	6

A = Away; H = Home; W = Win; D = Draw; L = Loss

==== Matches ====
23 August 2014 1	Recreativo	0–0	Zaragoza	Huelva
--:-- CEST (UTC+2)				Stadium: Estadio Nuevo Colombino

30 August 2014 2	Zaragoza	1–1	Osasuna	Zaragoza
--:-- CEST (UTC+2)				Stadium: La Romareda

7 September 2014 3	Barcelona B	4–1	Zaragoza	Barcelona
--:-- CEST (UTC+2)				Stadium: Mini Estadi

14 September 2014 4	Zaragoza	1–1	Sabadell	Zaragoza
--:-- CEST (UTC+2)				Stadium: La Romareda

20 September 2014 5	Zaragoza	1–0	Alavés	Zaragoza
--:-- CEST (UTC+2)				Stadium: La Romareda

27 September 2014 6	Llagostera	0–1	Zaragoza	Llagostera
--:-- CEST (UTC+2)				Stadium: Estadi Palamós Costa Brava

5 October 2014 7	Zaragoza	2–0	Mallorca	Zaragoza
--:-- CEST (UTC+2)				Stadium: La Romareda

12 October 2014 8	Lugo	3–3	Zaragoza	Lugo
--:-- CEST (UTC+2)				Stadium: Estadio Anxo Carro

18 October 2014 9	Zaragoza	2–1	Racing Santander	Zaragoza
--:-- CEST (UTC+2)				Stadium: La Romareda

26 October 2014 10	Alcorcón	1–3	Zaragoza	Alcorcón
--:-- CEST (UTC+2)				Stadium: Santo Domingo

3 November 2014 11	Zaragoza	2–3	Tenerife	Zaragoza
--:-- CET (UTC+1)				Stadium: La Romareda

9 November 2014 12	Sporting Gijón	3–1	Zaragoza	Gijón
--:-- CET (UTC+1)				Stadium: El Molinón

16 November 2014 13	Zaragoza	2–2	Real Betis	Zaragoza
--:-- CET (UTC+1)				Stadium: La Romareda

22 November 2014 14	Numancia	2–0	Zaragoza	Soria
--:-- CET (UTC+1)				Stadium: Nuevo Estadio Los Pajaritos

30 November 2014 15	Zaragoza	4–1	Ponferradina	Zaragoza
--:-- CET (UTC+1)				Stadium: La Romareda

8 December 2014 16	Albacete	2–2	Zaragoza	Albacete
--:-- CET (UTC+1)				Stadium: Estadio Carlos Belmonte

14 December 2014 17	Zaragoza	2–1	Girona	Zaragoza
--:-- CET (UTC+1)				Stadium: La Romareda

20 December 2014 18	Mirandés	1–1	Zaragoza	Miranda de Ebro
--:-- CET (UTC+1)				Stadium: Estadio Municipal de Anduva

4 January 2015 19	Zaragoza	0–2	Valladolid	Zaragoza
--:-- CET (UTC+1)				Stadium: La Romareda

11 January 2015 20	Las Palmas	5–3	Zaragoza	Las Palmas
--:-- CET (UTC+1)				Stadium: Estadio Gran Canaria

18 January 2015 21	Zaragoza	2–0	Leganés	Zaragoza
--:-- CET (UTC+1)				Stadium: La Romareda

24 January 2015 22	Zaragoza	2–0	Recreativo	Zaragoza
--:-- CET (UTC+1)				Stadium: La Romareda

7 February 2015 24	Zaragoza	4–0	Barcelona B	Zaragoza
--:-- CET (UTC+1)				Stadium: La Romareda

10 February 2015 23	Osasuna	0–1	Zaragoza	Pamplona
--:-- CET (UTC+1)				Stadium: El Sadar Stadium

15 February 2015 25	Sabadell	0–0	Zaragoza	Sabadell
--:-- CET (UTC+1)				Stadium: Estadi de la Nova Creu Alta

22 February 2015 26	Alavés	4–0	Zaragoza	Vitoria-Gasteiz
--:-- CET (UTC+1)				Stadium: Mendizorrotza Stadium

1 March 2015 27	Zaragoza	2–2	Llagostera	Zaragoza
--:-- CET (UTC+1)				Stadium: La Romareda

8 March 2015 28	Mallorca	3–2	Zaragoza	Palma
--:-- CET (UTC+1)				Stadium: Iberostar Estadi

14 March 2015 29	Zaragoza	0–0	Lugo	Zaragoza
--:-- CET (UTC+1)				Stadium: La Romareda

22 March 2015 30	Racing Santander	0–2	Zaragoza	Santander
--:-- CET (UTC+1)

29 March 2015 31	Zaragoza	1–1	Alcorcón	Zaragoza
--:-- CEST (UTC+2)				Stadium: La Romareda

5 April 2015 32	Tenerife	1–1	Zaragoza	Santa Cruz de Tenerife
--:-- CEST (UTC+2)

11 April 2015 33	Zaragoza	1–1	Sporting Gijón	Zaragoza
--:-- CEST (UTC+2)				Stadium: La Romareda

19 April 2015 34	Real Betis	4–0	Zaragoza	Seville
--:-- CEST (UTC+2)				Stadium: Benito Villamarín

26 April 2015 35	Zaragoza	1–0	Numancia	Zaragoza
--:-- CEST (UTC+2)				Stadium: La Romareda

3 May 2015 36	Ponferradina	1–1	Zaragoza	Ponferrada
--:-- CEST (UTC+2)

10 May 2015 37	Zaragoza	3–1	Albacete	Zaragoza
--:-- CEST (UTC+2)				Stadium: La Romareda

17 May 2015 38	Girona	1–1	Zaragoza	Girona
--:-- CEST (UTC+2)				Stadium: Estadi Montilivi

20 May 2015 39	Zaragoza	0–1	Mirandés	Zaragoza
--:-- CEST (UTC+2)				Stadium: La Romareda

24 May 2015 40	Valladolid	1–3	Zaragoza	Valladolid
--:-- CEST (UTC+2)				Stadium: Estadio José Zorrilla

31 May 2015 41	Zaragoza	0–2	Las Palmas	Zaragoza
--:-- CEST (UTC+2)				Stadium: La Romareda; Referee: Jorge Figueroa Vázquez

7 June 2015 42	Leganés	2–2	Zaragoza	Leganés
--:-- CEST (UTC+2)				Stadium: Estadio Municipal de Butarque; Referee: Ricardo de Burgos Bengoetxea

==== Promotion play-offs ====
11 June 2015 Semi-finals; First leg	Zaragoza	0–3	Girona	Zaragoza
--:-- CEST (UTC+2)				Stadium: La Romareda

14 June 2015 Semi-finals; Second leg	Girona	1–4 (4 (a)–4 agg.)	Zaragoza	Girona
--:-- CEST (UTC+2)				Stadium: Montilivi

11 June 2015 Finals; First leg	Zaragoza	3–1	Las Palmas	Zaragoza
--:-- CEST (UTC+2)				Stadium: La Romareda

21 June 2015 Finals; Second leg	Las Palmas	2–0 (3 (a)–3 agg.)	Zaragoza	Las Palmas
--:-- CEST (UTC+2)				Stadium: Estadio Gran Canaria

=== Copa del Rey ===
10 September 2014 Second round	Albacete	1–0	Zaragoza	Albacete
--:-- CEST (UTC+2)				Stadium: Estadio Carlos Belmonte

== Statistics ==
=== Goalscorers ===
Rank	Pos.	No.	Player	Segunda División	Promotion play-offs	Copa del Rey	Total
1	FW	9	(Spain) Borja Bastón	22	0	0	22
3	FW	10	(Brazil) Willian José	7	3	0	10
2	MF	7	(Bosnia and Herzegovina) Eldin Hadžić	8	0	0	8
4	MF	11	(Spain) Jaime Romero	7	0	0	7
4	MF		(Spain) Pedro	6	1	0	7
Total				61	7	0	68

Last updated: 17 June 2015
