= 2015 Segunda División play-offs =

Segunda División play-offs
- Season: 2014–15
- Promoted: Las Palmas
- Matches played: 6
- Goals scored: 16 (2.67 per match)

The 2015 Segunda División play-offs took place in June 2015 and has determined the third team which will be promoted to the top division. Teams placed between 3rd and 6th position (excluding reserve teams) are taking part in the promotion play-offs.

The regulations are the same as the previous season: in the semifinals the fifth placed team faces the fourth, while the sixth placed team faces the third. In case of a draw, extra time was played but there was a penalty shoot-out; the winner will be the best positioned team. The first leg of the semi-finals was played on 10 and 11 June, and the second leg on 13 and 14 June at home of the best positioned team. The final will also be two-legged, with the first leg on 18 June and the second leg on 21 June, with the best positioned team also playing the second leg at home.

== Road to the playoffs ==
=== League table ===
Pos	Team	Pld	W	D	L	GF	GA	GD	Pts	Promotion, qualification or relegation
3	Girona	42	24	10	8	63	35	+28	82	Qualification to promotion play-offs
4	Las Palmas (O, P)	42	22	12	8	73	47	+26	78	Qualification to promotion play-offs
5	Valladolid	42	21	9	12	65	40	+25	72	Qualification to promotion play-offs
6	Zaragoza	42	15	16	11	61	58	+3	61	Qualification to promotion play-offs

Updated to match(es) played on 24 May 2015. Source: LFP - Liga Adelante
Rules for classification: 1) points; 2) head-to-head points; 3) head-to-head goal difference; 4) goal difference; 5) number of goals scored
(O) Play-off winners; (P) Promoted

=== Girona ===
Girona qualified for the play-offs after failing to be automatically promoted in the final game of the season. The Catalans could not beat Lugo at Estadi Montilivi while Sporting Gijón beat Betis, to gain promotion. This will be the third time Girona has played this stage.

=== Las Palmas ===
Las Palmas assured the fourth position in the 41st game of the season. The Canarian team made a spectacular start finishing as leader in the first half of the season, but failed to gain automatic promotion after suffering several defeats. This will be its third consecutive promotion play-off.

=== Valladolid ===
As with Las Palmas, Real Valladolid assured its final position, fifth, in the 41st round. This is its first season in the Segunda División since its relegation in 2014.

=== Zaragoza ===
In its second season since its relegation from La Liga, Zaragoza clinched the sixth and last playoff spot in the last matchday. This will be its first performance at this stage.

== Promotion play-offs ==
Semifinals
3	Girona	3	1	4
6	Zaragoza	0	4	4
4	Las Palmas	1	0	1
5	Valladolid	1	0	1

Final
6	Zaragoza	3	0	3
4	Las Palmas	1	2	3

=== Semifinals ===
Team 1	Agg.	Team 2	1st leg	2nd leg
Valladolid	1–1 (a)	Las Palmas	1–1	0–0
Zaragoza	4–4 (a)	Girona	0–3	4–1

==== First leg ====
10 June 2015
20:00 (CEST)

Valladolid	1–1	Las Palmas
Pérez 23'	Summary	Araujo 9'

José Zorilla
Attendance: 19,100
Referee: Arias López

Valladolid	Las Palmas

GK	1	(Spain) Javi Varas
DF	17	(Spain) Carlos Peña	(yellow card) 83'
DF	6	(Spain) Jesús Rueda
DF	2	(Spain) Javi Chica	(yellow card) 43' (yellow-red card) 76'
DF	5	(Spain) Samuel
MF	8	(Portugal) André Leão	(yellow card) 27'
MF	22	(Spain) David Timor	(yellow card) 58' (yellow-red card) 80'
MF	18	(Spain) Álvaro Rubio		(substituted off) 79'
FW	9	(Spain) Roger
FW	10	(Spain) Óscar	(yellow card) 30'	(substituted off) 59'
DF	20	(Paraguay) Hernán Pérez		(substituted off) 80'
Substitutions:
GK	13	(Spain) Raúl Fernández
DF	3	(Venezuela) Johan Mojica		(substituted in) 59'
MF	14	(Spain) Omar		(substituted in) 79'
DF	15	(Spain) Chus Herrero		(substituted in) 80'
MF	16	(Spain) Lluís Sastre
FW	19	(Brazil) Túlio
DF	24	(Spain) Jonathan Pereira
Manager:
(Spain) Joan Francesc Ferrer "Rubi"

GK	1	(Spain) Raúl Lizoain
DF	2	(Spain) David Simón	(yellow card) 82'
DF	6	(Spain) Ángel López
DF	16	(Spain) Aythami Artiles
DF	5	(Spain) David García	(yellow card) 74'
MF	21	(Spain) Juan Carlos Valerón		(substituted off) 46'
MF	19	(Argentina) Emmanuel Culio	(yellow card) 62'
MF	18	(Spain) Javi Castellano
FW	10	(Argentina) Sergio Araujo
FW	20	(Spain) Jonathan Viera		(substituted off) 71'
MF	15	(Spain) Roque Mesa		(substituted off) 68'
Substitutions:
GK	13	(Spain) Casto
MF	4	(Spain) Vicente Gómez		(substituted in) 71'
FW	8	(Spain) Alfredo Ortuño
MF	11	(Spain) Momo		(substituted in) 68'
DF	12	(Uruguay) Marcelo Silva
MF	14	(Spain) Hernán		(substituted in) 46'
DF	23	(Spain) Dani Castellano
Manager:
(Spain) Paco Herrera

11 June 2015
20:00 (CEST)

Zaragoza	0–3	Girona
	Summary	Mata 23', 59'; Lejeune 45'

La Romareda
Attendance: 15,000
Referee: Valdés Aller

Zaragoza	Girona

GK	30	(Spain) Óscar Whalley
DF	17	(Spain) José Manuel Fernández
DF	26	(Spain) Diego Rico
DF	31	(Spain) Jesús Vallejo
DF	3	(Spain) Mario Abrante	(yellow card) 49'	(substituted off) 68'
DF	5	(Spain) Rubén		(substituted off) 68'
MF	21	(Spain) Iñigo Ruiz de Galarreta		(substituted off) 55'
FW	7	(Bosnia and Herzegovina) Eldin Hadžić
MF	18	(Spain) Albert Dorca	(yellow card) 11'
FW	15	(Spain) Pedro
FW	10	(Brazil) Willian José
Substitutions:
GK	1	(Spain) Pablo Alcolea
DF	4	(Uruguay) Leandro Cabrera		(substituted in) 68'
MF	6	(Albania) Vullnet Basha		(substituted in) 55'
MF	8	(Spain) Lolo
MF	19	(Spain) Natxo Insa
FW	20	(Spain) Tato
MF	23	(Spain) Javi Álamo		(substituted in) 68'
Manager:
(Serbia) Ranko Popović

GK	13	(Spain) Isaac Becerra
DF	4	(France) Florian Lejeune
DF	7	(Spain) Richy
DF	23	(Spain) David Juncà	(yellow card) 31'	(substituted off) 50'
DF	22	(Spain) Cifu
DF	14	(Spain) Pablo Íñiguez
MF	6	(Spain) Álex Granell
MF	29	(Spain) Pere Pons	(yellow card) 54'
MF	8	(Spain) Eloi Amagat	(yellow card) 65'	(substituted off) 65'
FW	21	(Spain) Francisco Sandaza		(substituted off) 79'
FW	9	(Spain) Jaime Mata
Substitutions:
GK	1	(Spain) Jorge Palatsí
MF	11	(Spain) Aday		(substituted in) 50'
MF	19	(Spain) Felipe Sanchón		(substituted in) 65'
MF	20	(Spain) Jandro
DF	28	(Spain) Carles Mas
FW	32	(Spain) Sebastián Coris
MF	44	(Spain) Marc Rovirola		(substituted in) 79'
Manager:
(Spain) Pablo Machín

==== Second leg ====
13 June 2015
19:00 (WEST)

Las Palmas	0–0	Valladolid
	Summary

Gran Canaria
Attendance: 17,312
Referee: Sagués Oscoz

Las Palmas	Valladolid

GK	1	(Spain) Raúl Lizoain
DF	2	(Spain) David Simón
DF	6	(Spain) Ángel López
DF	16	(Spain) Aythami Artiles
DF	5	(Spain) David García
MF	19	(Argentina) Emmanuel Culio
MF	18	(Spain) Javi Castellano
MF	14	(Spain) Hernán		(substituted off) 65'
FW	10	(Argentina) Sergio Araujo
FW	20	(Spain) Jonathan Viera		(substituted off) 86'
MF	15	(Spain) Roque Mesa	(yellow card) 54'	(substituted off) 66'
Substitutions:
GK	13	(Spain) Casto
MF	4	(Spain) Vicente Gómez		(substituted in) 65'
MF	7	(Spain) Nauzet Alemán
FW	9	(Spain) Asdrúbal		(substituted in) 66'
DF	12	(Uruguay) Marcelo Silva
MF	21	(Spain) Juan Carlos Valerón		(substituted in) 86'
DF	23	(Spain) Dani Castellano
Manager:
(Spain) Paco Herrera

GK	1	(Spain) Javi Varas	(yellow card) 73' (yellow-red card) 90'
DF	6	(Spain) Jesús Rueda
DF	17	(Spain) Carlos Peña	(yellow card) 48'	(substituted off) 64'
DF	5	(Spain) Samuel	(yellow card) 39'
DF	15	(Spain) Chus Herrero		(substituted off) 75'
FW	10	(Spain) Óscar
MF	8	(Portugal) André Leão
DF	3	(Venezuela) Johan Mojica	(yellow card) 31'
DF	20	(Paraguay) Hernán Pérez	(yellow card) 68' (yellow-red card) 72'
MF	16	(Spain) Lluís Sastre	(yellow card) 50'
FW	9	(Spain) Roger		(substituted off) 80'
Substitutions:
GK	13	(Spain) Raúl Fernández
FW	11	(Venezuela) Jeffrén
MF	14	(Spain) Omar	(yellow card) 76'	(substituted in) 75'
MF	18	(Spain) Álvaro Rubio
FW	19	(Brazil) Túlio		(substituted in) 80'
MF	23	(Spain) Alejandro Alfaro
DF	24	(Spain) Jonathan Pereira		(substituted in) 64'
Manager:
(Spain) Joan Francesc Ferrer "Rubi"

14 June 2015
17:00 (CEST)

Girona	1–4	Zaragoza
Aday 73'	Report	Willian José 19' (pen.), 34'; Cabrera 44'; Fernández 67'

Montilivi
Attendance: 8,348
Referee: Arcediano Monescillo

Girona	Zaragoza

GK	13	(Spain) Isaac Becerra
DF	11	(Spain) Aday Benítez	(yellow card) 74'
DF	14	(Spain) Pablo Íñiguez
DF	7	(Spain) Richy		(substituted off) 63'
DF	4	(France) Florian Lejeune
MF	23	(Spain) David Juncà	(yellow card) 33'	(substituted off) 46'
MF	29	(Spain) Pere Pons	(yellow card) 90+4'
MF	6	(Spain) Álex Granell
MF	20	(Spain) Jandro
MF	19	(Spain) Felipe Sanchón		(substituted off) 58'
FW	9	(Spain) Jaime Mata
Substitutions:
GK	30	(Spain) Moreno
MF	5	(Spain) Cristian Gómez
GK	17	(Spain) Juanlu Hens
FW	21	(Spain) Francisco Sandaza		(substituted in) 58'
DF	28	(Spain) Carles Mas	(yellow card) 65'	(substituted in) 63'
FW	32	(Spain) Sebastián Coris		(substituted in) 46'
DF	44	(Spain) Marc Rovirola
Manager:
(Spain) Pablo Machín

GK	13	(Morocco) Bono	(yellow card) 83'
DF	17	(Spain) José Manuel Fernández	(yellow card) 78'	(substituted off) 84'
DF	3	(Spain) Mario Abrante		(substituted off) 82'
DF	4	(Uruguay) Leandro Cabrera	(yellow card) 45'
DF	31	(Spain) Jesús Vallejo
MF	26	(Spain) Diego Rico
MF	18	(Spain) Albert Dorca
MF	21	(Spain) Iñigo Ruiz de Galarreta		(substituted off) 74'
MF	15	(Spain) Pedro
MF	7	(Bosnia and Herzegovina) Eldin Hadžić
FW	10	(Brazil) Willian José	(yellow card) 25'
Substitutions:
GK	1	(Spain) Pablo Alcolea
DF	5	(Spain) Rubén González		(substituted in) 82'
MF	6	(Albania) Vullnet Basha		(substituted in) 74'
MF	8	(Spain) Lolo
MF	11	(Spain) Jaime Romero
MF	19	(Spain) Natxo Insa
MF	23	(Spain) Javi Álamo		(substituted in) 84'
Manager:
(Serbia) Ranko Popović

=== Final ===
Team 1	Agg.	Team 2	1st leg	2nd leg
Zaragoza	3–3 (a)	Las Palmas	3–1	0-2

==== First leg ====
17 June 2015
20:00 (CEST)

Zaragoza	3–1	Las Palmas
Diego Rico 39'; Pedro 48'; Willian José 75'	Report	Viera 19'

La Romareda
Attendance: 32,000
Referee: Piñeiro Crespo

Zaragoza	Las Palmas

GK	13	(Morocco) Bono
DF	17	(Spain) José Manuel Fernández
DF	3	(Spain) Mario Abrante
DF	4	(Uruguay) Leandro Cabrera		(substituted off) 27'
DF	31	(Spain) Jesús Vallejo
MF	26	(Spain) Diego Rico
MF	18	(Spain) Albert Dorca
MF	21	(Spain) Iñigo Ruiz de Galarreta	(yellow card) 29'	(substituted off) 60'
MF	15	(Spain) Pedro
MF	7	(Bosnia and Herzegovina) Eldin Hadžić		(substituted off) 71'
FW	10	(Brazil) Willian José	(yellow card) 23'
Substitutions:
GK	1	(Spain) Pablo Alcolea
DF	5	(Spain) Rubén González
MF	6	(Albania) Vullnet Basha		(substituted in) 60'
MF	9	(Spain) Borja González
MF	11	(Spain) Jaime Romero		(substituted in) 27'
MF	19	(Spain) Natxo Insa
MF	23	(Spain) Javi Álamo		(substituted in) 71'
Manager:
(Serbia) Ranko Popović

GK	1	(Spain) Raúl Lizoain
DF	2	(Spain) David Simón
DF	16	(Spain) Aythami Artiles
DF	5	(Spain) David García
DF	6	(Spain) Ángel López
MF	18	(Spain) Javi Castellano
MF	15	(Spain) Roque Mesa		(substituted off) 77'
MF	20	(Spain) Jonathan Viera		(substituted off) 85'
MF	14	(Spain) Hernán		(substituted off) 65'
MF	19	(Argentina) Emmanuel Culio	(yellow card) 66'
FW	10	(Argentina) Sergio Araujo	(yellow card) 61'
Substitutions:
MF	7	(Spain) Nauzet Alemán
MF	9	(Spain) Asdrúbal Hernández		(substituted in) 77'
MF	11	(Spain) Momo		(substituted in) 85'
DF	12	(Uruguay) Marcelo Silva
GK	13	(Spain) Casto
MF	21	(Spain) Juan Carlos Valerón		(substituted in) 65'
DF	23	(Spain) Dani Castellano
Manager:
(Spain) Paco Herrera

==== Second leg ====
21 June 2015
18:00 (WEST)

Las Palmas	2–0	Zaragoza
Mesa 33'; Araujo 84'	Summary

Gran Canaria
Attendance: 28,232
Referee: Ocón Arráiz

Las Palmas	Zaragoza

GK	13	(Spain) Casto
DF	2	(Spain) David Simón
DF	16	(Spain) Aythami Artiles
DF	5	(Spain) David García	(yellow card) 90+4'
DF	6	(Spain) Ángel López
MF	18	(Spain) Javi Castellano
MF	15	(Spain) Roque Mesa		(substituted off) 88'
MF	20	(Spain) Jonathan Viera
MF	9	(Spain) Asdrúbal Hernández		(substituted off) 59'
MF	19	(Argentina) Emmanuel Culio		(substituted off) 73'
FW	10	(Argentina) Sergio Araujo
Substitutions:
GK	1	(Spain) Raúl Lizoain
MF	7	(Spain) Nauzet Alemán
FW	8	(Spain) Alfredo Ortuño		(substituted in) 73'
DF	12	(Uruguay) Marcelo Silva		(substituted in) 88'
MF	14	(Spain) Hernán		(substituted in) 59'
MF	21	(Spain) Juan Carlos Valerón
DF	23	(Spain) Dani Castellano
Manager:
(Spain) Paco Herrera

GK	13	(Morocco) Bono
DF	17	(Spain) José Manuel Fernández
DF	31	(Spain) Jesús Vallejo
DF	3	(Spain) Mario	(yellow card) 64'
DF	26	(Spain) Diego Rico
MF	6	(Albania) Vullnet Basha		(substituted off) 87'
MF	18	(Spain) Albert Dorca
MF	11	(Spain) Jaime Romero		(substituted off) 73'
MF	15	(Spain) Pedro	(yellow card) 41'
MF	7	(Bosnia and Herzegovina) Eldin Hadžić		(substituted off) 46'
FW	10	(Brazil) Willian José
Substitutions:
GK	1	(Spain) Pablo Alcolea
DF	4	(Uruguay) Leandro Cabrera
DF	5	(Spain) Rubén González
MF	8	(Spain) Lolo		(substituted in) 87'
FW	9	(Spain) Borja Bastón		(substituted in) 73'
MF	21	(Spain) Iñigo Ruiz de Galarreta
MF	23	(Spain) Javi Álamo	(yellow card) 68'	(substituted in) 46'
Manager:
(Serbia) Ranko Popović
