= List of Spanish football transfers summer 2016 =

This is a list of Spanish football transfers for the summer sale in the 2016–17 season of La Liga and Segunda División. Only moves from La Liga and Segunda División are listed.

The summer transfer window began on 1 July 2016, although a few transfers took place prior to that date. The window closed at midnight on 1 September 2016. Players without a club can join one at any time, either during or in between transfer windows. Clubs below La Liga level can also sign players on loan at any time. If needed, clubs can sign a goalkeeper on an emergency loan, if all others are unavailable.

== La Liga ==
=== Alavés ===
Manager: (Argentina) Mauricio Pellegrino (1st season)

In:

Out:

No.	Pos.	Nation	Player
20	FW	BRA	Deyverson (on loan from Levante)
8	MF	ESP	Víctor Camarasa (on loan from Levante)
14	FW	ARG	Cristian Espinoza (on loan from Villarreal, previously at Huracán)
24	DF	MAR	Zouhair Feddal (from Levante)
26	MF	ESP	Manu García (on loan from Manchester City)
11	MF	ESP	Ibai Gómez (from Athletic Bilbao)
15	DF	FRA	Théo Hernandez (on loan from Atlético Madrid)
28	FW	ESP	Dani Iglesias (loan return from Guadalajara)
23	MF	SRB	Nenad Krstičić (from Sampdoria)
6	MF	ESP	Marcos Llorente (on loan from Real Madrid)
17	MF	ESP	Édgar Méndez (from Granada)
13	GK	ESP	Adrián Ortolá (on loan from Barcelona)
2	DF	SRB	Aleksandar Pantić (on loan from Villarreal, previously on loan at Eibar)
4	DF	ESP	Alexis (from Besiktas)
9	FW	VEN	Christian Santos (from NEC)
7	FW	ESP	Rubén Sobrino (on loan from Manchester City, previously loaned at Girona)
16	MF	COL	Daniel Torres (from Independiente Medellín)
22	DF	ESP	Carlos Vigaray (from Getafe)

No.	Pos.	Nation	Player
20	MF	ESP	Dani Abalo (to Korona Kielce)
24	MF	ESP	Jagoba Beobide (to TBD)
17	DF	ESP	Aritz Borda (to Western Sydney Wanderers)
22	MF	ARG	Hernán Bernardello (to Montreal Impact)
2	DF	ESP	Javier Carpio (to Cádiz)
4	DF	ESP	Dani Estrada (to TBD)
11	MF	URU	Facundo Guichón (to UCAM Murcia)
14	MF	ESP	Sergio Mora (to UCAM Murcia)
8	MF	ESP	Dani Pacheco (loan return to Betis, later loaned to Getafe)
15	DF	ESP	Sergio Pelegrín (to Elche)
16	MF	ESP	Iñaki Sáenz (to Tenerife)
13	GK	ESP	Pau Torres (to Valladolid)
9	FW	ESP	David Torres (to Alcoyano)
7	MF	ESP	Juli (to Córdoba)

=== Athletic Bilbao ===
Manager: (Spain) Ernesto Valverde (4th season)

In:

Out:

No.	Pos.	Nation	Player
26	GK	ESP	Kepa Arrizabalaga (loan return from Valladolid)

No.	Pos.	Nation	Player
11	MF	ESP	Ibai (to Alavés)
18	MF	ESP	Carlos Gurpegui (retired)
9	FW	ESP	Kike Sola (on loan to Getafe, previously on loan from Middlesbrough)
21	FW	ESP	Borja Viguera (to Sporting Gijón)

=== Atlético Madrid ===
Manager: (Argentina) Diego Simeone (6th season)

In:

Out:

No.	Pos.	Nation	Player
23	MF	ARG	Nicolás Gaitán (from Benfica)
21	FW	FRA	Kevin Gameiro (from Sevilla)
—	FW	ESP	Héctor Hernández (loan return from Elche)
25	GK	POR	André Moreira (loan return from União da Madeira)
16	DF	CRO	Šime Vrsaljko (from Sassuolo)
17	MF	ITA	Alessio Cerci (loan return from Genoa, previously loaned at Milan)

No.	Pos.	Nation	Player
18	DF	ESP	Jesús Gámez (to Newcastle United)
8	MF	ARG	Matías Kranevitter (on loan to Sevilla)
23	FW	ARG	Luciano Vietto (on loan to Sevilla)
—	DF	ESP	Javier Manquillo (on loan to Sunderland)
—	FW	ESP	Óliver (on loan to Porto)
18	MF	POR	Diogo Jota (on loan to Porto)

=== Barcelona ===
Manager: (Spain) Luis Enrique (3rd season)

In:

Out:

No.	Pos.	Nation	Player
19	DF	FRA	Lucas Digne (from Paris Saint-Germain, previously on loan at Roma)
21	MF	POR	André Gomes (from Valencia)
6	MF	ESP	Denis Suárez (from Villarreal)
23	DF	FRA	Samuel Umtiti (from Lyon)
13	GK	NED	Jasper Cillessen (from Ajax)
17	FW	ESP	Paco Alcácer (from Valencia)

No.	Pos.	Nation	Player
21	DF	BRA	Adriano (to Beşiktaş)
6	DF	BRA	Dani Alves (to Juventus)
15	DF	ESP	Marc Bartra (to Borussia Dortmund)
19	FW	ESP	Sandro (to Málaga)
23	DF	BEL	Thomas Vermaelen (on loan to Roma)
2	DF	BRA	Douglas (on loan to Sporting Gijón)
17	FW	ESP	Munir (on loan to Valencia)
13	GK	CHI	Claudio Bravo (to Manchester City)
16	MF	ESP	Sergi Samper (on loan to Granada)

=== Betis ===
Manager: (Uruguay) Gus Poyet (1st season)

In:

Out:

No.	Pos.	Nation	Player
19	FW	ESP	Alex Alegría (loan return from Numancia)
14	DF	DEN	Riza Durmisi (from Brøndby)
6	MF	CHI	Felipe Gutiérrez (from Twente)
25	GK	ESP	Manu Herrera (from Zaragoza)
23	DF	ALG	Aïssa Mandi (from Stade de Reims)
8	MF	FRA	Jonas Martin (from Montpellier)
3	DF	ESP	Álex Martínez (loan return from Elche)
11	MF	ESP	Matías Nahuel (on loan from Villarreal)
9	FW	PAR	Antonio Sanabria (from Roma, previously on loan at Sporting Gijón)
18	FW	UKR	Roman Zozulya (from Dnipro Dnipropetrovsk)
15	MF	NED	Ryan Donk (on loan from Galatasaray)
22	MF	SRB	Darko Brašanac (from Partizan)

No.	Pos.	Nation	Player
12	FW	BRA	Leandro Damião (loan return to Santos, later signed by Flamengo)
—	MF	ESP	Javier Matilla (to Elche)
19	FW	ESP	Jorge Molina (to Getafe)
2	DF	ESP	Francisco Molinero (to Getafe)
3	DF	ESP	Martín Montoya (loan return to Barcelona, later signed by Valencia)
18	MF	SEN	Alfred N'Diaye (to Villarreal)
14	MF	ESP	Xavi Torres (to Sporting Gijón)
21	MF	ESP	Álvaro Vadillo (to Huesca)
23	MF	NED	Rafael van der Vaart (to Midtjylland)
9	FW	NED	Ricky van Wolfswinkel (loan return to Norwich City, later signed by Vitesse)
6	DF	ESP	Francisco Varela (to Oviedo)
17	DF	GER	Heiko Westermann (to Ajax)

=== Celta Vigo ===
Manager: (Argentina) Eduardo Berizzo (3rd season)

In:

Out:

No.	Pos.	Nation	Player
4	DF	ESP	David Costas (loan return from Mallorca)
15	MF	ESP	Álvaro Lemos (from Lugo)
17	FW	ESP	José Naranjo (from Gimnàstic)
24	DF	ARG	Facundo Roncaglia (from Fiorentina)
11	MF	DEN	Pione Sisto (from Midtjylland)
25	FW	ITA	Giuseppe Rossi (on loan from Fiorentina, previously on loan at Levante)

No.	Pos.	Nation	Player
10	FW	ESP	Nolito (to Manchester City)
16	MF	SRB	Dejan Dražić (on loan to Valladolid)

=== Deportivo La Coruña ===
Manager: (Spain) Gaizka Garitano (1st season)

In:

Out:

No.	Pos.	Nation	Player
6	DF	ESP	Raúl Albentosa (from Derby County, previously on loan at Málaga)
10	FW	ROU	Florin Andone (from Córdoba)
8	MF	TUR	Emre Çolak (from Galatasaray)
20	MF	BRA	Guilherme dos Santos (on loan from Udinese)
21	MF	POR	Bruno Gama (from Dnipro Dnipropetrovsk)
11	MF	ESP	Carles Gil (on loan from Aston Villa)
25	GK	ESP	Rubén Martínez (from Levante)
9	FW	COL	Marlos Moreno (on loan from Manchester City, previously at Nacional Medellín)
13	GK	POL	Przemysław Tytoń (from VfB Stuttgart)
17	MF	ESP	Borja Valle (from Oviedo)
7	FW	ESP	Joselu (on loan from Stoke City)
23	FW	NED	Ryan Babel (free agent)

No.	Pos.	Nation	Player
6	MF	ESP	Cani (to Zaragoza)
17	MF	ARG	Fede Cartabia (loan return to Valencia)
13	GK	ESP	Fabricio (to Beşiktaş)
10	MF	ESP	Juan Domínguez (on loan to Mallorca)
23	DF	ESP	Alberto Lopo (to Gimnàstic)
25	GK	ESP	Manu Fernández (to Machine Sazi)
21	MF	ESP	Luis Alberto (loan return to Liverpool, later signed by Lazio)
2	DF	ESP	Manuel Pablo (retired)
9	FW	ESP	Oriol Riera (on loan to Osasuna)
20	FW	URU	Jonathan Rodríguez (loan return to Benfica, then Santos Laguna)
7	FW	ESP	Lucas (to Arsenal)

=== Eibar ===
Manager: (Spain) José Luis Mendilibar (2nd season)

In:

Out:

No.	Pos.	Nation	Player
25	FW	POR	Bebé (from Benfica, previously on loan at Rayo Vallecano)
3	DF	ESP	Álex Gálvez (from Werder Bremen)
20	DF	FRA	Florian Lejeune (from Girona)
21	MF	ESP	Pedro León (from Getafe)
11	MF	ESP	Rubén Peña (from Leganés)
6	MF	ESP	Cristian Rivera (from Oviedo)
1	GK	ESP	Yoel (on loan from Valencia, previously loaned at Rayo Vallecano)

No.	Pos.	Nation	Player
2	DF	ESP	Jon Ansotegi (to Mallorca)
18	FW	ESP	Borja Bastón (loan return to Atlético Madrid, later signed by Swansea City)
21	FW	ESP	Saúl (to Pumas UNAM)
23	DF	ESP	Borja Ekiza (to Zirka Kropyvnytskyi)
11	MF	BIH	Izet Hajrović (loan return to Werder Bremen)
1	GK	ESP	Xabi Irureta (to Zaragoza)
25	GK	ESP	Jaime Jiménez (to TBD)
20	MF	ESP	Keko (to Málaga)
16	DF	ESP	Lillo (to Sporting Gijón)
3	DF	SRB	Aleksandar Pantić (loan return to Villarreal, later loaned to Alavés)
6	MF	CRO	Josip Radošević (loan return to Napoli)

=== Espanyol ===
Manager: (Spain) Quique Sánchez Flores (1st season)

In:

Out:

No.	Pos.	Nation	Player
11	FW	BRA	Léo Baptistão (from Atlético Madrid, previously on loan at Villarreal)
2	DF	ARG	Martín Demichelis (from Manchester City)
24	MF	ESP	Álex Fernández (loan return from Reading)
18	MF	ESP	Javi Fuego (from Valencia)
14	MF	ESP	José Manuel Jurado (from Watford)
—	GK	ESP	Germán Parreño (loan return from Girona)
19	MF	ARG	Pablo Piatti (on loan from Valencia)
13	GK	ESP	Diego López (on loan from Milan)
9	MF	ESP	José Antonio Reyes (from Sevilla)
1	GK	ESP	Roberto (from Olympiacos)
15	MF	ESP	David López (from Napoli)

No.	Pos.	Nation	Player
10	MF	ESP	Abraham (to Pumas UNAM)
1	GK	LTU	Giedrius Arlauskis (loan return to Watford)
25	FW	ESP	Marco Asensio (loan return to Real Madrid)
9	MF	ESP	Burgui (loan return to Real Madrid, later loaned to Sporting Gijón)
14	MF	ESP	José Cañas (to PAOK)
2	DF	ESP	Rober Correa (to Elche)
18	DF	ESP	Juan Rafael Fuentes (to Osasuna)
19	MF	ESP	Joan Jordán (on loan to Valladolid)
11	MF	ESP	Paco Montañés (on loan to Levante)
6	DF	CHI	Enzo Roco (loan return to O'Higgins, later signed by Cruz Azul)
28	FW	SEN	Mamadou Sylla (on loan to Eupen)
—	GK	ESP	Pau (on loan to Tottenham Hotspur)
—	MF	ESP	Marc Caballé (to Cornellà, previously on loan)

=== Granada ===
Manager: (Spain) Paco Jémez (1st season)

In:

Out:

No.	Pos.	Nation	Player
—	FW	ECU	José Angulo (from Independiente del Valle)
26	MF	CIV	Victorien Angban (on loan from Chelsea, previously on loan at Sint-Truiden)
10	MF	FRA	Jérémie Boga (on loan from Chelsea)
13	GK	MEX	Guillermo Ochoa (on loan from Málaga)
9	FW	ARG	Ezequiel Ponce (on loan from Roma)
20	DF	FRA	Matthieu Saunier (from Troyes)
12	DF	BRA	Gabriel Silva (on loan from Udinese, previously on loan at Genoa)
2	DF	ESP	Tito (from Rayo Vallecano)
11	MF	ESP	Jon Toral (on loan from Arsenal, previously on loan at Birmingham City)
16	MF	MAR	Mehdi Carcela (from Benfica)
23	FW	ESP	Alberto Bueno (on loan from Porto)
14	DF	FRA	Franck Tabanou (on loan from Swansea City)
15	MF	ISR	Omer Atzili (from Beitar Jerusalem)
24	FW	UKR	Artem Kravets (on loan from Dynamo Kyiv, previously on loan at VfB Stuttgart)
18	MF	BRA	Andreas Pereira (on loan from Manchester United)
28	DF	POR	Luís Martins (loan return from Osasuna)
17	DF	POR	Rúben Vezo (on loan from Valencia)
4	MF	ESP	Sergi Samper (on loan from Barcelona)
3	DF	URU	Gastón Silva (on loan from Torino)

No.	Pos.	Nation	Player
6	DF	MTQ	Jean-Sylvain Babin (to Sporting Gijón)
3	DF	ITA	Cristiano Biraghi (loan return to Inter Milan, later signed by Pescara)
24	DF	POR	Ricardo Costa (to Luzern)
35	GK	MKD	Stole Dimitrievski (to Gimnàstic)
12	DF	BRA	Dória (loan return to Marseille)
16	MF	FRA	Abdoulaye Doucouré (loan return to Watford)
9	FW	MAR	Youssef El-Arabi (to Lekhwiya)
13	GK	ESP	Andrés Fernández (loan return to Porto, later loaned to Villarreal)
25	GK	ESP	Jesús Fernández (to Cádiz)
7	MF	ESP	Robert Ibáñez (loan return to Valencia)
18	DF	POR	Miguel Lopes (loan return to Sporting CP)
5	DF	ESP	Diego Mainz (to TBD)
17	MF	ESP	Édgar Méndez (to Alavés)
27	FW	VEN	Adalberto Peñaranda (to Watford, later loaned to Udinese)
20	MF	ESP	Rubén Pérez (on loan to Leganés)
23	MF	ESP	Rubén Rochina (to Rubin Kazan)
14	DF	ESP	Salva Ruiz (loan return to Valencia)
11	FW	NGR	Isaac Success (to Watford)

=== Las Palmas ===
Manager: (Spain) Quique Setién (2nd season)

In:

Out:

No.	Pos.	Nation	Player
7	MF	GHA	Kevin-Prince Boateng (from Milan)
20	FW	ESP	Tyronne del Pino (loan return from Huesca)
19	MF	ARG	Mateo García (from Instituto de Córdoba)
—	FW	ESP	Asdrúbal Hernández (loan return from Leganés)
9	FW	CRO	Marko Livaja (from Rubin Kazan, previously on loan at Empoli)
22	DF	POR	Hélder Lopes (from Paços de Ferreira)
12	DF	BRA	Michel (from Almería)

No.	Pos.	Nation	Player
7	MF	ESP	Nauzet (to TBD)
6	DF	ESP	Ángel (to TBD)
8	FW	BRA	Willian José (loan return to Deportivo Maldonado, later signed by Real Sociedad)
12	MF	GHA	Mubarak Wakaso (loan return to Rubin Kazan, later signed by Panathinaikos)
29	DF	ESP	Nili (to Barcelona B)
21	MF	ESP	Juan Carlos Valerón (to Unión Abrisajac)

=== Leganés ===
Manager: (Spain) Asier Garitano (4th season)

In:

Out:

No.	Pos.	Nation	Player
25	GK	ITA	Alberto Brignoli (on loan from Juventus, previously on loan at Sampdoria)
9	FW	ESP	Miguel Ángel Guerrero (from Sporting Gijón)
19	MF	ESP	Unai López (on loan from Athletic Bilbao)
7	FW	VEN	Darwin Machís (on loan from Granada, previously on loan at Huesca)
4	DF	ESP	Adrián Marín (on loan from Villarreal)
12	DF	ALG	Carl Medjani (from Levante)
21	MF	ESP	Rubén Pérez (on loan from Granada)
15	DF	ESP	Diego Rico (from Zaragoza)
8	MF	BRA	Gabriel (from Juventus, previously on loan)
20	FW	BRA	Luciano (on loan from Corinthians)
14	FW	CIV	Mamadou Koné (from Racing Santander, previously on loan at Oviedo)

No.	Pos.	Nation	Player
4	DF	ESP	Unai Albizua (to UCAM Murcia)
19	FW	ESP	Asdrúbal (loan return to Las Palmas)
9	FW	ESP	Guillermo Fernández (loan return to Athletic Bilbao, later signed by Elche)
14	FW	ESP	Borja Lázaro (to Huesca)
8	MF	ESP	Jorge Miramón (to Reus)
20	MF	ESP	Rubén Peña (to Eibar)
1	GK	ESP	Queco Piña (to Huesca)
21	MF	ESP	Iñigo Ruiz de Galarreta (loan return to Athletic Bilbao, later signed by Numancia)
3	DF	ESP	Luis Ruiz (to Cádiz)
16	DF	ESP	César Soriano (to Huesca)

=== Málaga ===
Manager: (Spain) Juande Ramos (1st season)

In:

Out:

No.	Pos.	Nation	Player
21	MF	ESP	Jony (from Sporting Gijón)
20	MF	ESP	Keko (from Eibar)
2	DF	BFA	Bakary Koné (from Lyon)
22	MF	SRB	Zdravko Kuzmanović (on loan from Basel, previously on loan at Udinese)
5	DF	ESP	Diego Llorente (on loan from Real Madrid, previously loaned at Rayo Vallecano)
19	FW	ESP	Sandro (from Barcelona)
8	FW	URU	Michael Santos (from River Plate Montevideo)
4	DF	VEN	Mikel Villanueva (from Atlético Malagueño)
13	GK	UKR	Denys Boyko (on loan from Beşiktaş)

No.	Pos.	Nation	Player
2	DF	ESP	Raúl Albentosa (loan return to Derby County, later signed by Deportivo La Coruña)
19	DF	CIV	Arthur Boka (to Sion)
20	FW	CRO	Duje Čop (loan return to Cagliari, later loaned to Sporting Gijón)
4	DF	ESP	Cifu (on loan to Girona)
21	DF	BLR	Egor Filipenko (to Maccabi Tel Aviv)
10	MF	POR	Ricardo Horta (on loan to Braga)
16	MF	MAR	Hachim Mastour (loan return to Milan, later loaned to PEC Zwolle)
13	GK	MEX	Guillermo Ochoa (on loan to Granada)
12	MF	ARG	Fernando Tissone (to TBD)
8	FW	NGR	Ikechukwu Uche (loan return to Tigres UANL, later signed by Gimnàstic)

=== Osasuna ===
Manager: (Spain) Enrique Martín (3rd season)

In:

Out:

No.	Pos.	Nation	Player
21	DF	ESP	Carlos Clerc (from Espanyol, previously on loan at Girona)
16	DF	ESP	Juan Rafael Fuentes (from Espanyol)
18	MF	ESP	Fran Mérida (from Huesca)
9	FW	ESP	Oriol Riera (on loan from Deportivo La Coruña)
17	MF	ESP	Jaime Romero (from Udinese, previously on loan at Zaragoza)
14	MF	ESP	Fausto Tienza (from Alcorcón)
12	FW	FRA	Emmanuel Rivière (on loan from Newcastle United)
22	MF	FRA	Didier Digard (on loan from Betis)

No.	Pos.	Nation	Player
31	MF	ESP	José García (to Alcoyano)
8	MF	ESP	Mikel Merino (to Borussia Dortmund)
14	MF	ESP	Maikel Mesa (to Mirandés)
7	FW	ESP	Nino (to Elche)
16	MF	ESP	Manuel Sánchez (to Alcorcón)
11	FW	ESP	Urko Vera (to Huesca)

=== Real Madrid ===
Manager: (France) Zinedine Zidane (2nd season)

In:

Out:

No.	Pos.	Nation	Player
20	FW	ESP	Marco Asensio (loan return from Espanyol)
21	FW	ESP	Álvaro Morata (from Juventus)

No.	Pos.	Nation	Player
20	FW	ESP	Jesé (to Paris Saint-Germain)

=== Real Sociedad ===
Manager: (Spain) Eusebio Sacristán (2nd season)

In:

Out:

No.	Pos.	Nation	Player
7	FW	ESP	Juanmi (from Southampton)
12	FW	BRA	Willian José (from Deportivo Maldonado, previously on loan at Las Palmas)
25	GK	ESP	Toño (from AEK Larnaca)

No.	Pos.	Nation	Player
7	MF	POR	Bruma (loan return to Galatasaray)
34	MF	ESP	Eneko Capilla (on loan to Numancia)
24	DF	ESP	Alberto de la Bella (on loan to Olympiacos)
22	FW	BRA	Jonathas (to Rubin Kazan)
23	DF	MEX	Diego Reyes (loan return to Porto, later loaned to Espanyol)

=== Sevilla ===
Manager: (Argentina) Jorge Sampaoli (1st season)

In:

Out:

No.	Pos.	Nation	Player
12	FW	FRA	Wissam Ben Yedder (from Toulouse)
11	MF	ARG	Joaquín Correa (from Sampdoria)
19	MF	BRA	Paulo Henrique Ganso (from São Paulo)
14	MF	JPN	Hiroshi Kiyotake (from Hannover 96)
4	MF	ARG	Matías Kranevitter (on loan from Atlético Madrid)
24	DF	ARG	Gabriel Mercado (from River Plate)
17	MF	ESP	Pablo Sarabia (from Getafe)
22	MF	ITA	Franco Vázquez (from Palermo)
9	FW	ARG	Luciano Vietto (on loan from Atlético Madrid)
10	MF	FRA	Samir Nasri (on loan from Manchester City)
25	GK	ITA	Salvatore Sirigu (on loan from Paris Saint-Germain)

No.	Pos.	Nation	Player
19	MF	ARG	Éver Banega (to Inter Milan)
13	GK	POR	Beto (to Sporting CP)
23	DF	ESP	Coke (to Schalke 04)
16	DF	ARG	Federico Fazio (loan return to Tottenham Hotspur, later loaned to Roma)
17	DF	POR	Diogo Figueiras (to Olympiacos)
9	FW	FRA	Kevin Gameiro (to Atlético Madrid)
4	MF	POL	Grzegorz Krychowiak (to Paris Saint-Germain)
24	FW	ESP	Fernando Llorente (to Swansea City)
10	MF	ESP	José Antonio Reyes (to Espanyol)

=== Sporting Gijón ===
Manager: (Spain) Abelardo Fernández (4th season)

In:

Out:

No.	Pos.	Nation	Player
17	FW	QAT	Akram Afif (on loan from Villarreal, previously at Eupen)
5	DF	VEN	Fernando Amorebieta (from Fulham, previously loaned at Middlesbrough)
3	DF	MTQ	Jean-Sylvain Babin (from Granada)
14	MF	ESP	Burgui (on loan from Real Madrid, previously loaned at Espanyol)
24	FW	CRO	Duje Čop (on loan from Cagliari, previously loaned at Málaga)
23	MF	ESP	Moi Gómez (from Villarreal, previously on loan at Getafe)
13	GK	ESP	Diego Mariño (from Levante)
7	MF	ESP	Víctor Rodríguez (from Elche, previously on loan at Getafe)
16	DF	ESP	Lillo (from Eibar)
21	MF	ESP	Xavi Torres (from Betis)
30	GK	ESP	Óscar Whalley (from Zaragoza, previously on loan at Huesca)
25	FW	ESP	Borja Viguera (from Athletic Bilbao)
2	DF	BRA	Douglas (on loan from Barcelona)

No.	Pos.	Nation	Player
8	MF	ESP	Álex Barrera (to Zaragoza)
5	DF	COL	Bernardo (to Middlesbrough)
13	GK	ESP	Alberto García (to Getafe)
9	FW	ESP	Miguel Ángel Guerrero (to Leganés)
25	MF	CRO	Alen Halilović (loan return to Barcelona, later signed by Hamburg)
2	DF	ESP	Luis Hernández (to Leicester City)
4	DF	CHI	Igor Lichnovsky (loan return to Porto, later loaned to Valladolid)
23	MF	ESP	Jony (to Málaga)
3	DF	ESP	Álex Menéndez (to TBD)
17	MF	ESP	Omar Mascarell (loan return to Real Madrid, later signed by Eintracht Frankfurt)
20	FW	PAR	Antonio Sanabria (loan return to Roma, later signed by Betis)

=== Valencia ===
Manager: (Spain) Pako Ayestarán (2nd season)

In:

Out:

No.	Pos.	Nation	Player
16	MF	ARG	Fede Cartabia (loan return from Deportivo La Coruña)
20	MF	ESP	Álvaro Medrán (from Real Madrid, previously on loan at Getafe)
21	DF	ESP	Martín Montoya (from Barcelona, previously on loan at Betis)
17	MF	POR	Nani (from Fenerbahçe)
24	DF	ARG	Ezequiel Garay (from Zenit Saint Petersburg)
5	DF	FRA	Eliaquim Mangala (on loan from Manchester City)
—	DF	ESP	Salva Ruiz (loan return from Granada)
7	MF	ESP	Mario Suárez (on loan from Watford)
9	FW	ESP	Munir (on loan from Barcelona)

No.	Pos.	Nation	Player
19	DF	ESP	Antonio Barragán (to Middlesbrough)
24	MF	RUS	Denis Cheryshev (loan return to Real Madrid, later signed by Villarreal)
12	MF	BRA	Danilo (loan return to Braga, later loaned to Benfica)
8	MF	ALG	Sofiane Feghouli (to West Ham United)
18	MF	ESP	Javi Fuego (to Espanyol)
21	MF	POR	André Gomes (to Barcelona)
7	FW	ESP	Álvaro Negredo (on loan to Middlesbrough)
11	MF	ARG	Pablo Piatti (on loan to Espanyol)
12	MF	ESP	Robert Ibáñez (on loan to Leganés, previously on loan at Granada)
5	DF	GER	Shkodran Mustafi (to Arsenal)

=== Villarreal ===
Manager: (Spain) Fran Escribá (1st season)

In:

Out:

No.	Pos.	Nation	Player
3	DF	ESP	José Ángel (on loan from Porto)
7	MF	RUS	Denis Cheryshev (from Real Madrid, previously on loan at Valencia)
13	GK	ESP	Andrés Fernández (on loan from Porto, previously on loan at Granada)
—	MF	UKR	Oleksiy Hutsulyak (from Karpaty Lviv, previously on loan)
4	MF	SEN	Alfred N'Diaye (from Betis)
10	FW	BRA	Alexandre Pato (from Corinthians)
18	FW	ITA	Nicola Sansone (from Sassuolo)
24	FW	COL	Rafael Santos Borré (on loan from Atlético Madrid, previously on loan at Deportivo Cali)
20	MF	ITA	Roberto Soriano (from Sampdoria)

No.	Pos.	Nation	Player
13	GK	FRA	Alphonse Areola (loan return to Paris Saint-Germain)
24	DF	CIV	Eric Bailly (to Manchester United)
10	FW	BRA	Léo Baptistão (loan return to Atlético Madrid, later signed by Espanyol)
27	DF	ESP	Adrián Marín (on loan to Leganés)
26	MF	ESP	Matías Nahuel (on loan to Betis)
4	MF	ESP	Tomás Pina (to Club Brugge)
7	MF	ESP	Samu (to Rubin Kazan)
18	MF	ESP	Denis Suárez (to Barcelona)

== Segunda División ==
=== Alcorcón ===
Manager: (Romania) Cosmin Contra (1st season)

In:

Out:

No.	Pos.	Nation	Player
17	MF	ESP	Iván Alejo (from Villarreal B)
8	MF	ESP	Sergio Aguza (from Ponferradina)
18	DF	ESP	Unai Elgezabal (on loan from Eibar, previously at Barakaldo)
24	FW	ESP	Luis Fernández (from Deportivo, previously on loan at Huesca)
11	FW	ESP	Álvaro Giménez (from Elche)
23	DF	ESP	Iván González (from Târgu Mureș)
19	FW	ARG	Martín Luque (on loan from Internacional Porto Alegre, previously on loan at Peñarol)
3	DF	ESP	David Navarro (from Levante)
9	MF	ESP	Samu (on loan from Albacete)
15	MF	ESP	Manuel Sánchez (from Osasuna)
20	MF	ESP	Tropi (on loan from Valencia)
12	MF	ESP	Víctor Pérez (on loan from Valladolid, previously loaned at Alcorcón)

No.	Pos.	Nation	Player
24	MF	ESP	José Campaña (loan return to Sampdoria, later signed by Levante)
6	DF	ESP	Chema (to Levante)
10	MF	ESP	Dani Benítez (to Racing Ferrol)
3	DF	TOG	Djené (to Sint-Truiden)
25	MF	ESP	Natxo Insa (to Levante)
19	DF	ESP	Mikel Iribas (to Fuenlabrada)
9	FW	ESP	Máyor (to Reus)
20	FW	ESP	Marc Nierga (to Granada B)
30	MF	ESP	Víctor Pastrana (on loan to Ponferradina)
28	DF	ESP	Fernando Román (on loan to Hércules)
8	MF	ESP	Rubén Sanz (to Fuenlabrada)
—	MF	ESP	Fausto Tienza (to Osasuna)

=== Almería ===
Manager: (Spain) Fernando Soriano (2nd season)

In:

Out:

No.	Pos.	Nation	Player
15	MF	ESP	Corona (from Brisbane Roar)
6	MF	SEN	Pape Diamanka (from Zaragoza)
16	MF	ESP	Fidel (from Córdoba)
18	FW	ESP	Juanjo (from Llagostera)
5	DF	ESP	Alex Quintanilla (from Barakaldo)
14	DF	ESP	Ángel Trujillo (from Levante)

No.	Pos.	Nation	Player
32	DF	ESP	Adrián Castellano (to Celta Vigo B)
5	DF	ESP	Carlos Cuéllar (to TBD)
2	DF	BRA	Michel Macedo (to Las Palmas)
11	MF	ARG	Juan Ramírez (loan return to Colorado Rapids, later loaned to Talleres de Córdoba)
25	MF	CHI	Lolo Reyes (loan return to Betis, later signed by Universidad de Chile)
6	DF	MNE	Esteban Saveljich (loan return to Racing de Avellaneda, later signed by Levante)
—	MF	ESP	Fernando Soriano (retired)

=== Cádiz ===
Manager: (Spain) Álvaro Cervera (2nd season)

In:

Out:

No.	Pos.	Nation	Player
24	MF	FRA	Rafidine Abdullah (from Lorient)
2	DF	ESP	Javier Carpio (from Alavés)
18	FW	ESP	Rubén Cruz (from Albacete)
13	GK	ESP	Jesús Fernández (from Granada)
26	MF	ESP	Aitor García (from Mérida)
20	MF	ESP	Nico Hidalgo (on loan from Juventus, previously on loan at Granada B)
6	MF	ESP	José Mari (from Levante)
19	FW	ESP	Alfredo Ortuño (on loan from Las Palmas, previously on loan at Mallorca)
15	DF	ESP	Luis Ruiz (from Leganés)
17	DF	SEN	Khalifa Sankaré (from Asteras Tripolis)
10	FW	ESP	Gorka Santamaría (on loan from Athletic Bilbao)
—	MF	AZE	Eddy Silvestre (from Murcia, previously on loan at Córdoba)

No.	Pos.	Nation	Player
—	GK	ESP	Pol Ballesté (loan return to Atlético Malagueño, later signed by Granada B)
—	FW	SRB	Ranko Despotović (to TBD)
—	MF	ESP	Jandro (to TBD)
—	GK	ESP	Guille Lara (to Marbella)
—	FW	ESP	Kike Márquez (to TBD)
—	DF	ESP	Andrés Sánchez (to Marbella)

=== Córdoba ===
Manager: (Spain) José Luis Oltra (2nd season)

In:

Out:

No.	Pos.	Nation	Player
11	MF	ESP	Alejandro Alfaro (from Valladolid)
20	DF	ESP	Antoñito (from Albacete)
2	DF	ESP	José Antonio Caro (from Betis, previously on loan at Elche)
24	MF	ESP	Borja Domínguez (from Celta Vigo, previously on loan at Racing Ferrol)
19	MF	ESP	Guille Donoso (from Sporting Gijón B)
10	MF	ESP	Juli (from Alavés)
13	GK	POL	Paweł Kieszek (from Estoril)
14	FW	ITA	Federico Piovaccari (from Western Sydney Wanderers)
17	MF	ESP	Edu Ramos (from Albacete)
9	FW	ESP	Rodri (from Munich 1860, previously on loan at Valladolid)

No.	Pos.	Nation	Player
10	FW	ROU	Florin Andone (to Deportivo La Coruña)
24	DF	ESP	Albert Dalmau (to Hércules)
13	GK	ESP	Ismael Falcón (to Tenerife)
16	MF	ESP	Fidel (to Almería)
14	MF	ESP	Rafa Gálvez (to Albacete)
22	MF	ESP	Nando (loan return to Valencia, later loaned to Oviedo)
5	MF	ESP	Víctor Pérez (loan return to Valladolid, later loaned to Alcorcón)
11	MF	AZE	Eddy Silvestre (loan return to Murcia, later signed by Cádiz)
9	FW	ESP	Xisco (to Muangthong United)

=== Elche ===
Manager: (Spain) Alberto Toril (1st season)

In:

Out:

No.	Pos.	Nation	Player
21	DF	ESP	Edu Albácar (unattached)
2	DF	ESP	Rober Correa (from Espanyol)
13	GK	ESP	Juan Carlos (from Rayo Vallecano)
23	MF	ESP	Albert Dorca (from Zaragoza)
19	FW	ESP	Guillermo Fernández (from Athletic Bilbao, previously on loan at Leganés)
17	MF	ESP	Pablo Hervías (on loan from Real Sociedad, previously on loan at Oviedo)
22	DF	ESP	Urtzi Iriondo (on loan from Athletic Bilbao)
20	DF	ESP	Josete (from Oviedo)
4	MF	ESP	Javier Matilla (from Betis)
11	FW	ESP	Nino (from Osasuna)
26	GK	ESP	Germán Parreño (from Espanyol, previously on loan at Girona)
15	MF	ESP	Pedro (from Zaragoza)
18	DF	ESP	Sergio Pelegrín (from Alavés)
27	DF	ESP	Luis Pérez (from Jaén)

No.	Pos.	Nation	Player
4	DF	ESP	Hugo Álvarez (to UCAM Murcia)
28	DF	ESP	José Antonio Caro (loan return to Betis, later signed by Córdoba)
20	MF	ESP	Javier Espinosa (loan return to Villarreal, later signed by Levante)
10	FW	ESP	Álvaro Giménez (to Alcorcón)
11	FW	ESP	Héctor Hernández (loan return to Atlético Madrid)
25	GK	ESP	Javi Jiménez (to Huesca)
3	DF	ESP	Álex Martínez (loan return to Betis)
7	MF	ESP	Alex Moreno (loan return to Rayo Vallecano)

=== Getafe ===
Manager: (Argentina) Juan Esnáider (2nd season)

In:

Out:

No.	Pos.	Nation	Player
5	MF	ROU	Paul Anton (on loan from Dinamo București)
18	MF	ARG	Facundo Castillón (on loan from Racing Avellaneda, previously on loan at Banfield)
6	DF	ARG	Cata Díaz (from Boca Juniors)
4	MF	ARG	Alejandro Faurlin (from Queens Park Rangers)
21	DF	VEN	Rolf Feltscher (from Duisburg)
14	MF	ESP	David Fuster (from Olympiacos)
1	GK	ESP	Alberto García (from Sporting Gijón)
23	MF	ESP	Álvaro Jiménez (on loan from Real Madrid)
17	DF	ARG	Nicolás Gorosito (from Slovan Bratislava)
19	FW	ESP	Jorge Molina (from Betis)
15	DF	ESP	Francisco Molinero (from Betis)
20	MF	ESP	Dani Pacheco (on loan from Betis, previously loaned at Alavés)
3	DF	GER	Johannes van den Bergh (from Hertha Berlin)
9	FW	ESP	Kike Sola (on loan from Athletic Bilbao, previously on loan at Middlesbrough)

No.	Pos.	Nation	Player
21	MF	ESP	Moi Gómez (loan return to Villarreal, later signed by Sporting Gijón)
3	DF	ESP	Roberto Lago (to APOEL Nicosia)
14	MF	ESP	Pedro León (to Eibar)
23	MF	ESP	Álvaro Medrán (loan return to Real Madrid, later signed by Valencia)
1	GK	HUN	Balázs Megyeri (to Greuther Fürth)
17	FW	GHA	Bernard Mensah (loan return to Atlético Madrid, later loaned to Vitória de Guimarães)
2	DF	URU	Álvaro Pereira (loan return to Estudiantes La Plata, later signed by Cerro Porteño)
22	MF	ESP	Juan Rodríguez (to Mallorca)
18	MF	ESP	Víctor Rodríguez (loan return to Elche, later signed by Sporting Gijón)
10	MF	ESP	Pablo Sarabia (to Sevilla)
—	DF	ESP	Juan Valera (retired)
4	DF	URU	Emiliano Velázquez (loan return to Atlético Madrid, later loaned to Sporting Braga)
5	DF	ARG	Santiago Vergini (loan return to Sunderland, later signed by Boca Juniors)
15	DF	ESP	Carlos Vigaray (to Alavés)
30	MF	BRA	Wanderson (to Red Bull Salzburg)

=== Gimnàstic Tarragona ===
Manager: (Spain) Vicente Moreno (4th season)

In:

Out:

No.	Pos.	Nation	Player
15	MF	CHI	Juan Delgado (from Colo Colo)
27	GK	MKD	Stole Dimitrievski (from Granada)
24	DF	CMR	Mohammed Djetei (from Union Douala)
7	MF	ESP	José Carlos (from Llagostera)
25	DF	GEO	Otar Kakabadze (from Dinamo Tbilisi)
22	DF	ESP	Alberto Lopo (from Deportivo La Coruña)
16	FW	CRO	Elvir Maloku (from Hajduk Split)
17	FW	MAR	Moha Rharsalla (from Olimpik Donetsk)
13	GK	ARG	Sebastián Saja (from Racing de Avellaneda)
14	FW	NGR	Ikechukwu Uche (from Tigres UANL, previously on loan at Málaga)
19	MF	FRA	Wilfried Zahibo (from Valencia Mestalla)

No.	Pos.	Nation	Player
15	MF	GEO	Giorgi Aburjania (to Sevilla Atlético)
—	DF	ESP	Jordi Calavera (to Eibar, later loaned to Lugo)
5	DF	ESP	Xisco Campos (to Ponferradina)
25	MF	CMR	Achille Emaná (to Tokushima Vortis)
7	FW	ESP	Xisco Muñoz (retired)
28	FW	ESP	José Naranjo (to Celta Vigo)
22	DF	ESP	Pablo Marí (to Manchester City, later loaned to Girona)
10	FW	ESP	Rayco (to Ponferradina)
19	MF	ESP	Miguel Palanca (to Korona Kielce)
31	GK	ESP	Alberto Varo (to Barcelona B)

=== Girona ===
Manager: (Spain) Pablo Machín (4th season)

In:

Out:

No.	Pos.	Nation	Player
13	GK	MAR	Bono (on loan from Atlético Madrid, previously on loan at Zaragoza)
30	GK	ESP	Gianni Cassaro (from Peralada)
17	DF	ESP	Cifu (on loan from Málaga)
3	DF	ESP	Saúl García (on loan from Deportivo La Coruña, previously on loan at Tenerife)
15	DF	ESP	Juanpe (from Granada, previously on loan at Valladolid)
12	FW	ITA	Samuele Longo (on loan from Inter Milan, previously on loan at Frosinone)
—	FW	ESP	Manel (from Sabadell)
2	DF	ESP	Pablo Marí (on loan from Manchester City, previously at Gimnàstic Tarragona)
9	MF	ESP	Portu (from Albacete)
4	DF	ESP	Jonás Ramalho (from Bilbao Athletic)
1	GK	ESP	René Román (from Llagostera)
21	FW	ESP	Fran Sandaza (from FC Tokyo)

No.	Pos.	Nation	Player
13	GK	ESP	Isaac Becerra (to Valladolid)
17	DF	ESP	Carlos Clerc (loan return to Espanyol, later signed by Osasuna)
4	DF	FRA	Florian Lejeune (to Eibar)
25	FW	SRB	Dejan Lekić (to Mallorca)
9	FW	ESP	Jaime Mata (to Valladolid)
18	FW	ESP	Jairo Morillas (loan return to Espanyol, later loaned to Numancia)
1	GK	ESP	Germán Parreño (loan return to Espanyol, later to Elche)
20	FW	ESP	Rubén Sobrino (loan return to Manchester City, later loaned to Alavés)

=== Huesca ===
Manager: (Spain) Juan Antonio Anquela (2nd season)

In:

Out:

No.	Pos.	Nation	Player
15	DF	GEQ	Carlos Akapo (from Valencia Mestalla)
2	DF	ESP	Jair Amador (from Atlético Levante)
11	FW	MNE	Boris Cmiljanić (from PSV Eindhoven)
7	MF	ESP	David Ferreiro (from Lugo)
1	GK	ESP	Sergio Herrera (from Amorebieta)
25	GK	ESP	Javi Jiménez (from Elche)
9	FW	ESP	Borja Lázaro (from Leganés)
8	MF	ESP	Gonzalo Melero (from Ponferradina)
13	GK	ESP	Queco Piña (from Leganés)
16	DF	ESP	César Soriano (from Leganés)
—	MF	ESP	Álvaro Vadillo (from Betis)
—	FW	ESP	Urko Vera (from Osasuna)

No.	Pos.	Nation	Player
23	FW	ESP	Mikel Arruabarrena (loan return to Eibar, later signed by Eastern Sports Club)
11	FW	ESP	Tyronne del Pino (loan return to Las Palmas)
15	DF	ESP	Christian Fernández (loan return to Las Palmas, later signed by Oviedo)
24	FW	ESP	Luis Fernández (loan return to Deportivo La Coruña, later signed by Alcorcón)
22	FW	ESP	Héctor Figueroa (loan return to Las Palmas, later loaned to Ponferradina)
25	GK	ARG	Leo Franco (retired)
17	FW	VEN	Darwin Machís (loan return to Granada, later loaned to Leganés)
8	MF	ESP	Fran Mérida (to Osasuna)
20	DF	ESP	Óscar Ramírez (to Cartagena)
6	MF	ESP	Iñigo Ros (to Tudelano)
1	GK	ESP	Óscar Whalley (loan return to Zaragoza, later signed by Sporting Gijón)

=== Levante ===
Manager: (Spain) Juan Muñiz (1st season)

In:

Out:

No.	Pos.	Nation	Player
24	MF	ESP	José Campaña (from Sampdoria, previously on loan at Alcorcón)
16	DF	ESP	Chema (from Alcorcón)
6	MF	ESP	Javier Espinosa (from Villarreal, previously on loan at Elche)
1	GK	ESP	Raúl Fernández (from Mirandés)
21	MF	ESP	Natxo Insa (from Alcorcón)
9	FW	ESP	Roger Martí (loan return from Valladolid)
20	MF	ESP	Paco Montañés (on loan from Espanyol)
22	MF	ESP	Abraham Minero (on loan from Zaragoza)
15	DF	ESP	Sergio Postigo (from Spezia)
13	GK	ESP	Álex Remiro (on loan from Athletic Bilbao)
—	DF	MNE	Esteban Saveljich (from Racing de Avellaneda, previously on loan at Almería)
4	DF	ESP	Róber Suárez (on loan from Deportivo La Coruña)

No.	Pos.	Nation	Player
6	MF	ESP	Víctor Camarasa (on loan to Alavés)
9	MF	COL	Mauricio Cuero (to Santos Laguna)
20	FW	BRA	Deyverson (on loan to Alavés)
24	DF	MAR	Zouhair Feddal (to Alavés)
23	FW	ALG	Nabil Ghilas (loan return to Porto)
12	DF	ESP	Juanfran (to TBD)
22	MF	ESP	José Mari (to Cádiz)
1	GK	ESP	Diego Mariño (to Sporting Gijón)
13	GK	ESP	Rubén Martínez (to Deportivo La Coruña)
14	DF	ALG	Carl Medjani (to Leganés)
4	DF	ESP	David Navarro (to Alcorcón)
15	MF	ARG	Lucas Orbán (loan return to Valencia, later signed by Genoa)
21	FW	ITA	Giuseppe Rossi (loan return to Fiorentina, later loaned to Celta Vigo)
16	DF	ESP	Ángel Trujillo (to Almería)
17	MF	ESP	Jordi Xumetra (to Zaragoza)

=== Lugo ===
Manager: (Spain) Luis César Sampedro (1st season)

In:

Out:

No.	Pos.	Nation	Player
23	DF	ESP	Jordi Calavera (on loan from Eibar, previously at Gimnàstic Tarragona)
22	MF	ESP	Adrià Carmona (from Albacete)
4	DF	ESP	Marcelo (on loan from Juventus, previously loaned at UCAM Murcia)
20	DF	ESP	Ignasi Miquel (from Ponferradina)
17	MF	ESP	Alfonso Pedraza (on loan from Villarreal)
14	MF	ESP	Yelko Pino (from Celta Vigo, previously on loan at QPR)

No.	Pos.	Nation	Player
22	DF	ESP	Pau Cendrós (to Mirandés)
2	DF	ESP	David de Coz (to TBD)
7	MF	ESP	David Ferreiro (to Huesca)
14	MF	ESP	Álvaro Lemos (to Celta Vigo)
15	MF	ESP	David López (to TBD)
18	MF	ESP	Sergio Marcos (loan return to Villarreal, later signed by Valladolid)
17	DF	ESP	Abel Molinero (to Fuenlabrada)
23	FW	ESP	Jonathan Pereira (to Oviedo)
4	DF	ESP	Israel Puerto (to TBD)
3	DF	ESP	Fernando Vega (to TBD)

=== Mallorca ===
Manager: (Spain) Fernando Vázquez (2nd season)

In:

Out:

No.	Pos.	Nation	Player
15	DF	ESP	Jon Ansotegi (from Eibar)
32	MF	ESP	Fernando Cano (from Valencia Mestalla)
28	FW	NGR	Cedric (loan return from Valencia Mestalla)
5	MF	ARG	Juan Culio (from Zaragoza)
14	FW	ESP	Adrián Dalmau (on loan from to Espanyol, previously loaned at Numancia)
18	MF	ESP	Juan Domínguez (on loan from Deportivo La Coruña)
16	FW	SRB	Dejan Lekić (from Girona)
30	DF	ESP	Julio Pleguezuelo (on loan from Arsenal)
4	DF	ESP	Antonio Raillo (from Espanyol, previously on loan at Ponferradina)
24	MF	ESP	Juan Rodríguez (from Getafe)
1	GK	ESP	Roberto Santamaría (from Ponferradina)
—	MF	ESP	Álex Serrano (from Espanyol B)

No.	Pos.	Nation	Player
15	FW	PAR	Javier Acuña (to Numancia)
17	MF	ESP	Manuel Arana (to TBD)
21	FW	ESP	Coro (to TBD)
4	DF	ESP	David Costas (loan return to Celta Vigo)
20	DF	GER	Tobias Henneböle (to TBD)
25	GK	ESP	Tomeu Nadal (to Albacete)
9	FW	ESP	Alfredo Ortuño (loan return to Las Palmas, later loaned to Cádiz)
7	MF	FRA	Michael Pereira (to Yeni Malatyaspor)
5	DF	ESP	Guillem Truyols (to AEK Larnaca)
1	GK	GER	Timon Wellenreuther (loan return to Schalke 04)

=== Mirandés ===
Manager: (Spain) Carlos Terrazas (4th season)

In:

Out:

No.	Pos.	Nation	Player
18	DF	ESP	Jon Aurtenetxe (from Athletic Bilbao, previously on loan at Tenerife)
17	MF	ESP	Álvaro Bustos (on loan from Sporting Gijón)
22	DF	ESP	Pau Cendrós (from Lugo)
5	DF	ESP	Fran Cruz (from Rapid București)
19	FW	ESP	Fofo (from Llagostera)
13	GK	ESP	Roberto Gutiérrez (from Tenerife)
7	MF	ESP	Iker Guarrotxena (from Bilbao Athletic)
23	MF	ESP	Javi Hervás (from Željezničar)
12	FW	ESP	Pedro Martín (on loan from Celta Vigo)
14	MF	ESP	Maikel Mesa (from Osasuna)
20	DF	ESP	Ruymán (from Llagostera)

No.	Pos.	Nation	Player
10	MF	ESP	Fran Carnicer (to Albacete)
1	GK	ESP	Raúl Fernández (to Levante)
2	DF	FRA	Mickaël Gaffoor (to Albacete)
14	DF	ESP	Ernesto Galán (to Rayo Vallecano)
22	MF	ESP	Álex García (to Tenerife)

=== Numancia ===
Manager: (Spain) Jagoba Arrasate (2nd season)

In:

Out:

No.	Pos.	Nation	Player
9	FW	PAR	Javier Acuña (from Mallorca)
23	MF	ESP	Eneko Capilla (on loan from Real Sociedad)
7	FW	ESP	Manu del Moral (from Valladolid)
8	MF	ESP	Alberto Escassi (from Llagostera)
13	GK	ESP	Aitor Fernández (from Villarreal B)
16	DF	ESP	Carlos Gutiérrez (from Las Palmas, previously on loan at Burgos)
18	FW	ESP	Jairo Morillas (on loan from Espanyol, previously loaned at Girona)
19	MF	ESP	Iñigo Ruiz de Galarreta (from Athletic Bilbao, previously on loan at Leganés)

No.	Pos.	Nation	Player
9	FW	ESP	Alex Alegría (loan return to Betis)
7	FW	ESP	Dani Aquino (to Racing Santander)
23	FW	ESP	Adrián Dalmau (loan return to Espanyol, later loaned to Mallorca)
11	MF	ESP	Javier del Pino (retired)
12	MF	URU	Jorge Díaz (loan return to Zaragoza, later loaned to Reus)
19	MF	ESP	Antonio Martínez (loan return to Alcorcón, later signed by Cultural Leonesa)
16	DF	ESP	Juanma (to Fuenlabrada)
18	MF	ESP	Vicente Pérez (to UCAM Murcia)

=== Oviedo ===
Manager: (Spain) Fernando Hierro (1st season)

In:

Out:

No.	Pos.	Nation	Player
21	MF	URU	Martín Alaníz (on loan from Villa Española, previously on loan at Chapecoense)
18	DF	ESP	Christian Fernández (from Las Palmas previously on loan at Huesca)
24	DF	ESP	Óscar Gil (on loan from Athletic Bilbao)
13	GK	ESP	Juan Carlos (from Albacete)
8	FW	ESP	Michu (from Langreo)
22	MF	ESP	Nando (on loan from Valencia, previously on loan at Córdoba)
16	MF	ESP	Jorge Ortiz (from Fuenlabrada)
11	FW	ESP	Jonathan Pereira (from Lugo)
20	MF	ESP	David Rocha (from Houston Dynamo)
15	MF	ESP	Lucas Torró (on loan from Real Madrid)
3	DF	ESP	Francisco Varela (from Betis)

No.	Pos.	Nation	Player
3	DF	ESP	Dani Bautista (retired)
12	MF	ESP	Diego Aguirre (loan return to Rayo Vallecano)
9	FW	ESP	Diego Cervero (to Fuenlabrada)
8	MF	ESP	Héctor Font (to TBD)
21	MF	ESP	Pablo Hervías (loan return to Real Sociedad, later loaned to Elche)
20	DF	ESP	Josete (to Elche)
22	FW	CIV	Mamadou Koné (loan return to Racing Santander, later signed by Leganés)
24	DF	ESP	Nacho López (to Ponferradina)
18	MF	ESP	Míchel (loan return to Guangzhou R&F, later signed by Valladolid)
13	GK	ESP	Rubén Miño (to AEK Larnaca)
15	MF	CMR	Franck Omgba (to Hércules)
29	MF	ESP	Cristian Rivera (to Eibar)
11	MF	ESP	Borja Valle (to Deportivo La Coruña)

=== Rayo Vallecano ===
Manager: (Spain) José Ramón Sandoval (1st season)

In:

Out:

No.	Pos.	Nation	Player
22	MF	ESP	Diego Aguirre (loan return from Oviedo)
19	MF	GUI	Lass Bangoura (loan return from Stade Reims)
27	MF	ESP	Santi Comesaña (from Coruxo)
2	DF	ESP	Ernesto Galán (from Mirandés)
1	GK	ARG	Paulo Gazzaniga (on loan from Southampton)
14	DF	ESP	Pablo Íñiguez (on loan from Villarreal)
12	MF	COL	Johan Mojica (loan return from Valladolid)
6	MF	ESP	Alex Moreno (loan return from Elche)

No.	Pos.	Nation	Player
23	FW	POR	Bebé (loan return to Benfica, later signed by Eibar)
21	MF	ESP	Jozabed (to Fulham)
13	GK	ESP	Juan Carlos (to Elche)
22	DF	ESP	José Ángel Crespo (loan return to Aston Villa, later signed by PAOK Thessaloniki)
27	DF	ESP	Diego Llorente (loan return to Real Madrid, later loaned to Málaga)
14	MF	ESP	Pablo Hernández (loan return to Al-Arabi, later loaned to Leeds United)
2	DF	ESP	Tito (to Granada)
25	GK	ESP	Yoel (loan return to Valencia, later loaned to Eibar)

=== Reus ===
Manager: (Spain) Natxo González (3rd season)

In:

Out:

No.	Pos.	Nation	Player
19	MF	ESP	Alexander Albistegi (from Lleida)
18	DF	ESP	Pichu Atienza (from Hércules)
12	DF	ESP	Joan Campins (from Barcelona B, previously on loan at Zaragoza)
16	FW	NGR	Macauley Chrisantus (from AEK Athens)
1	GK	ESP	Jordi Codina (from APOEL Nicosia, previously on loan at Pafos)
20	MF	URU	Jorge Díaz (on loan from Zaragoza, previously on loan at Numancia)
23	DF	ESP	Migue García (from Racing Santander)
21	FW	ESP	Máyor (from Alcorcón)
15	DF	ESP	Melli (from Neftchi Baku)
24	MF	ESP	Jorge Miramón (from Leganés)
7	FW	ESP	David Querol (from Llagostera)

No.	Pos.	Nation	Player
—	DF	POR	Eliseu Cassamá (to Rio Ave)
—	MF	ESP	Álex Colorado (to Llagostera)

=== Sevilla Atlético ===
Manager: (Spain) Diego Martínez (3rd season)

In:

Out:

No.	Pos.	Nation	Player
—	MF	GEO	Giorgi Aburjania (from Gimnàstic Tarragona)
—	MF	FRA	Bilal Boutobba (from Olympique de Marseille)
—	DF	ESP	Álex Muñoz (from Hércules)
—	GK	CMR	Fabrice Ondoa (on loan from Gimnàstic Tarragona, previously at Pobla de Mafumet)
—	DF	ESP	Abel Pascual (from Palencia)
—	DF	ESP	Borja San Emeterio (from Racing Santander)
—	MF	ESP	Fede San Emeterio (from Racing Santander)
—	MF	URU	Andrés Schetino (on loan from Fiorentina, previously on loan at Livorno)

No.	Pos.	Nation	Player
—	MF	ESP	Roger Barnils (loan return to Llagostera)
—	MF	ESP	Luismi (to Valladolid)
—	DF	ESP	José Antonio Martínez (to Barcelona B)
—	MF	ESP	Francisco Tena (to Real Madrid Castilla)

=== Tenerife ===
Manager: (Spain) José Luis Martí (2nd season)

In:

Out:

No.	Pos.	Nation	Player
4	DF	FRA	Samuel Camille (from Ponferradina)
8	MF	ESP	Marc Crosas (on loan from Cruz Azul)
1	GK	ESP	Ismael Falcón (from Córdoba)
20	MF	ESP	Álex García (from Mirandés)
2	MF	ESP	Edu Oriol (from Llagostera)
11	MF	ESP	Iñaki Sáenz (from Alavés)

No.	Pos.	Nation	Player
15	DF	ESP	Jon Aurtenetxe (loan return to Athletic Bilbao, later signed by Mirandés)
4	DF	ESP	Cristian García (to Terrassa)
7	MF	ESP	Javi Lara (to Atlético Kolkata)
8	MF	ESP	Ricardo León (to TBD)
13	GK	ESP	Roberto Gutiérrez (to Mirandés)
18	DF	ESP	Saúl García (loan return to Deportivo, later loaned to Girona)

=== UCAM Murcia ===
Manager: (Spain) José María Salmerón (2nd season)

In:

Out:

No.	Pos.	Nation	Player
16	DF	ESP	Unai Albizua (from Leganés)
4	DF	ESP	Hugo Álvarez (from Elche)
6	MF	ALB	Vullnet Basha (from Ponferradina)
25	GK	ESP	Fernando (from Real Murcia)
12	MF	URU	Facundo Guichón (from Alavés)
20	FW	ESP	Jesús Imaz (from Llagostera)
7	FW	HON	Jona (from Albacete)
17	MF	COD	Ritchie Kitoko (from Udinese, previously on loan at Asteras Tripolis)
21	MF	ESP	Pere Milla (on loan from Eibar, last season at UD Logroñés)
14	MF	ESP	Sergio Mora (from Alavés)
19	FW	ESP	Natalio (from Llagostera)
23	MF	ESP	Vicente Pérez (from Numancia)
24	MF	ESP	Tito (from Llagostera)

No.	Pos.	Nation	Player
—	GK	GUI	Bouba (to TBD)
—	DF	ESP	Pol Bueso (to TBD)
—	MF	ESP	Checa (to Hércules)
—	MF	ESP	Josan (to Albacete)
—	MF	ESP	Julio de Dios (to TBD)
—	MF	ESP	Manolo (to Jumilla)
—	DF	ESP	Marcelo (loan return to Juventus, later loaned to Lugo)
—	MF	ESP	Nono (loan return to Elche, later signed by Diósgyőri)
—	DF	ESP	Ángel Robles (to Jumilla)
—	FW	ESP	Álex Rubio (to Linense)
—	FW	ESP	Tito (to Jumilla)

=== Valladolid ===
Manager: (Spain) Paco Herrera (1st season)

In:

Out:

No.	Pos.	Nation	Player
6	DF	ARG	Luciano Balbi (from Huracán)
13	GK	ESP	Isaac Becerra (from Girona)
22	DF	ESP	Markel Etxeberria (on loan from Athletic Bilbao)
20	DF	ESP	Alberto Guitián (from Zaragoza)
19	MF	ESP	Joan Jordán (on loan from Espanyol)
4	DF	CHI	Igor Lichnovsky (on loan from Porto, previously on loan at Sporting Gijón)
11	MF	ESP	Álex López (on loan from Celta Vigo, previously on loan at Sheffield Wednesday)
16	MF	ESP	Luismi (from Sevilla Atlético)
9	FW	ESP	Jaime Mata (from Girona)
14	MF	ESP	Sergio Marcos (from Villarreal, previously on loan at Lugo)
10	MF	ESP	Míchel (from Guangzhou R&F, previously on loan at Oviedo)
1	GK	ESP	Pau Torres (from Alavés)
15	DF	ESP	Rafa (from Paderborn)
28	FW	GEQ	Ibán Salvador (from Valencia Mestalla)

No.	Pos.	Nation	Player
11	MF	ESP	Alejandro Alfaro (to Córdoba)
1	GK	ESP	Kepa Arrizabalaga (loan return to Athletic Bilbao)
6	MF	ESP	Borja Fernández (to Atlético de Kolkata)
14	DF	ESP	Juanpe (loan return to Granada, later signed by Girona)
5	DF	ESP	Samuel Llorca (to Racing Santander)
20	FW	ESP	Manu del Moral (to Numancia)
23	FW	ESP	Roger Martí (loan return to Levante)
3	MF	COL	Johan Mojica (loan return to Rayo Vallecano)
24	FW	ITA	Vincenzo Rennella (to Miami FC)
9	FW	ESP	Rodri (loan return to Munich 1860, later signed by Córdoba)
18	MF	ESP	Álvaro Rubio (to TBD)
4	DF	URU	Marcelo Silva (to Zaragoza)
13	GK	POR	Bruno Varela (loan return to Benfica, later signed by Vitória Setúbal)

=== Zaragoza ===
Manager: (Spain) Luis Milla (1st season)

In:

Out:

No.	Pos.	Nation	Player
20	MF	ESP	Álex Barrera (from Sporting Gijón)
8	MF	ESP	Cani (from Deportivo La Coruña)
3	DF	ESP	Jorge Casado (from Ponferradina)
11	MF	ESP	Edu García (from Ebro)
1	GK	ESP	Xabi Irureta (from Eibar)
23	DF	ROU	Răzvan Popa (from Inter Milan)
30	GK	ESP	Álvaro Ratón (promoted from Deportivo Aragón)
2	DF	ESP	Fran Rodríguez (from Real Madrid Castilla)
14	DF	URU	Marcelo Silva (from Valladolid)
17	MF	ESP	Jordi Xumetra (from Levante)
21	MF	ESP	Alberto Zapater (unattached)

No.	Pos.	Nation	Player
1	GK	ESP	Pablo Alcolea (on loan to Toledo)
13	GK	MAR	Bono (loan return to Atlético Madrid, later loaned to Girona)
21	DF	ESP	Joan Campins (loan return to Barcelona, later signed by Reus)
23	MF	SEN	Pape Diamanka (to Almería)
8	MF	ESP	Albert Dorca (to Elche)
14	MF	ARG	Juan Culio (to Mallorca)
20	DF	ESP	Alberto Guitián (to Valladolid)
25	GK	ESP	Manu Herrera (to Betis)
17	MF	COL	Fredy Hinestroza (loan return to La Equidad, later signed by Santos Laguna)
24	MF	ESP	Abraham Minero (on loan to Levante)
33	FW	ESP	Jorge Ortí (on loan to Cultural Leonesa)
15	MF	ESP	Pedro (to Elche)
22	DF	ESP	Diego Rico (to Leganés)
11	MF	ESP	Jaime Romero (loan return to Udinese, later signed by Osasuna)
27	MF	ESP	Tarsi (to Bilbao Athletic)
31	DF	ESP	Jesús Vallejo (loan return to Real Madrid, later loaned to Eintracht Frankfurt)
