= 2015–16 Real Zaragoza season =

Real Zaragoza
2015–16 season
- President: Christian Lapetra
- Manager: Ranko Popović (matches 1-18); Lluís Carreras (matches 19-42)
- Stadium: La Romareda
Home colours

The 2015–16 season was the 84th season in Real Zaragoza's history and the 19th in the second-tier of Spanish football.

== Squad ==
Note: Flags indicate national team as defined under FIFA eligibility rules; some limited exceptions apply. Players may hold more than one non-FIFA nationality.

No.	Pos.	Nation	Player
1	GK	ESP	Pablo Alcolea
2	DF	ESP	Marc Bertrán
4	DF	URU	Leandro Cabrera
5	DF	ESP	Rubén González
6	MF	POL	Cezary Wilk
8	MF	ESP	Albert Dorca
9	FW	ESP	Ángel
10	MF	ESP	Javi Ros
11	MF	ESP	Jaime Romero (on loan from Udinese)
12	MF	ESP	Manuel Lanzarote
13	GK	MAR	Bono (on loan from Atlético Madrid)
14	MF	ARG	Emmanuel Culio
15	MF	ESP	Pedro Sánchez

No.	Pos.	Nation	Player
16	DF	ESP	Isaac Carcelén
17	MF	COL	Fredy Hinestroza (on loan from La Equidad)
18	FW	CMR	Jean Marie Dongou
19	MF	ESP	Erik Morán (on loan from Athletic Bilbao)
20	DF	ESP	Alberto Guitián
21	DF	ESP	Joan Campins (on loan from Barcelona)
22	DF	ESP	Diego Rico
23	MF	SEN	Pape Diamanka
24	DF	ESP	Abraham Minero
25	GK	ESP	Manu Herrera
31	DF	ESP	Jesús Vallejo (on loan from Real Madrid) (captain)
32	MF	ESP	Sergio Gil
33	FW	ESP	Jorge Ortí

== Competitions ==
=== Overall ===
Competition	Final position
Segunda División	8th
Copa del Rey	3rd round

=== Liga ===
==== League table ====
Pos	Team	Pld	W	D	L	GF	GA	GD	Pts	Promotion, qualification or relegation
6	Osasuna (O, P)	42	17	13	12	47	40	+7	64 (Note: Osasuna ahead of Alcorcón and Zaragoza on head-to-head record; Osasuna 7 points, Alcorcón 6 points, Zaragoza 4 points)	Qualification to promotion play-offs
7	Alcorcón	42	18	10	14	48	44	+4	64	
8	Zaragoza	42	17	13	12	50	44	+6	64	
9	Oviedo	42	16	11	15	52	51	+1	59	
10	Numancia	42	13	18	11	57	51	+6	57 (Note: Numancia ahead of Elche on overall goal difference; Numancia +6, Elche -6)	

Source: LFP
Rules for classification: 1) points; 2) head-to-head points; 3) head-to-head goal difference; 4) goal difference; 5) number of goals scored
(O) Play-off winners; (P) Promoted

==== Matches ====
Kickoff times are in CET. Win Draw Loss

Match	Opponent	Venue	Result
1	Mirandés	A	1–1
2	Almería	H	3–2
3	Leganés	A	1–1
4	Córdoba	H	0–1
5	Osasuna	H	0–1
6	Lugo	A	0–0
7	Alavés	H	1–0
8	Albacete	A	1–3
9	Tenerife	H	2–0
10	Girona	A	0–0
11	Elche	H	2–0
12	Mallorca	A	0–0
13	Valladolid	H	0–2
14	Alcorcón	A	1–0
15	Ponferradina	H	2–0
16	Bilbao Ath.	A	0–1
17	Numancia	H	2–2
18	Nàstic	A	3–1
19	Huesca	H	3–3
20	Oviedo	A	1–0
21	Llagostera	H	1–0

Match	Opponent	Venue	Result
22	Mirandés	H	1–2
23	Almería	A	2–1
24	Leganés	H	1–0
25	Córdoba	A	0–2
26	Osasuna	A	1–1
27	Lugo	H	3–1
28	Alavés	A	0–0
29	Albacete	H	1–0
30	Tenerife	A	0–0
31	Girona	H	0–3
32	Elche	A	2–1
33	Mallorca	H	2–1
34	Valladolid	A	1–2
35	Alcorcón	H	3–1
36	Ponferradina	A	1–1
37	Bilbao Ath.	H	2–0
38	Numancia	A	2–2
39	Nàstic	H	0–1
40	Huesca	A	1–1
41	Oviedo	H	1–0
42	Llagostera	A	6–2

=== Copa del Rey ===
==== 3rd round ====
Match	Date	Opponent	Venue	Result
1	15 October 2015	Llagostera	H	1–2
