= Javi Castellano =

Spanish footballer (born 1987)

Personal information
- Full name: Javier Castellano Betancor
- Date of birth: 2 November 1987 (age 39)
- Place of birth: Las Palmas, Spain
- Height: 1.85 m (6 ft 1 in)
- Position: Defensive midfielder

Team information
- Current team: Recreativo
- Number: 18

Youth career
- Las Palmas

Senior career*
Years	Team	Apps	(Gls)
2006–2008	Las Palmas B	28	(0)
2008–2011	Mallorca B	14	(0)
2008–2009	→ Cultural Leonesa (loan)	36	(1)
2009	→ Albacete (loan)	3	(0)
2010–2011	→ Real Unión (loan)	35	(2)
2011–2021	Las Palmas	223	(0)
2021–2022	UD Logroñés	30	(1)
2023	Atlético Paso	15	(0)
2023–2024	SD Logroñés	32	(0)
2024–2025	Panachaiki	16	(1)
2025–	Recreativo	16	(0)
- * Club domestic league appearances and goals as of 7 May 2026

Javier 'Javi' Castellano Betancor (born 2 November 1987) is a Spanish professional footballer who plays as a defensive midfielder for Segunda Federación club Recreativo de Huelva.

== Club career ==
Born in Las Palmas, Canary Islands, Castellano graduated from UD Las Palmas' youth setup, and made his senior debut with the reserves in 2006, in the Tercera División. On 2 January 2008 he appeared in his first game as a professional, playing the full 90 minutes in a 2–1 away loss against Villarreal CF in the round of 32 of the Copa del Rey.

On 31 January 2008, Castellano moved to another reserve team, RCD Mallorca B also in the fourth division. On 14 August, he was loaned to Segunda División B club Cultural y Deportiva Leonesa in a season-long deal.

After another loan stints at Albacete Balompié and Real Unión, Castellano cut ties with the Balearic Islands side in June 2011. Late in the month, he returned to his first club Las Palmas after signing a three-year contract.

Castellano played 43 games in the 2014–15 campaign – playoffs included – helping to a return to La Liga after 13 years. He made his debut in the competition on 22 August 2015, featuring the full 90 minutes in a 1–0 defeat at Atlético Madrid. It was his only appearance of the campaign, due to a serious knee injury.

== Personal life ==
Castellano's twin brother, Daniel, was also a footballer and a midfielder. He too represented Las Palmas.
