= David Muñoz (footballer) =

Spanish footballer

Personal information
- Full name: David Muñoz Pueyo
- Date of birth: 9 July 1997 (age 29)
- Place of birth: Zaragoza, Spain
- Height: 1.79 m (5 ft 10 in)
- Position: Forward

Team information
- Current team: Utrillas
- Number: 17

Youth career
- Olivar
- Zaragoza
- 2015–2016: Málaga

Senior career*
Years	Team	Apps	(Gls)
2014–2015	Zaragoza B	7	(0)
2014–2015	Zaragoza	3	(0)
2015–2017	Málaga B	23	(5)
2017–2018	Logroñés B	36	(17)
2018–2019	San Juan	37	(7)
2019–2020	Sariñena	26	(2)
2020–2021	Sabiñánigo	31	(9)
2021–2022	Calamocha	29	(5)
2022–2023	Cuarte	21	(0)
2023	Calamocha	6	(0)
2024–	Utrillas	18	(2)
- * Club domestic league appearances and goals as of 19:22, 28 May 2024 (UTC)

David Muñoz Pueyo (born 9 July 1997) is a Spanish footballer who plays for CD Utrillas as a forward.

== Club career ==
After playing for lowly Olivar CF, Muñoz moved to Real Zaragoza, and progressed through the youth setup. On 16 July 2014 he was called up to the main squad, and also took part of the club's pre-season matches.

On 23 August 2014, before even having appeared for the B-side, Muñoz made his professional debut, starting in a 0–0 draw at Recreativo de Huelva in the Segunda División championship. The following 14 July he signed for Málaga CF, being initially assigned to the reserves in Tercera División.
