= Florian Lejeune =

French footballer (born 1991)

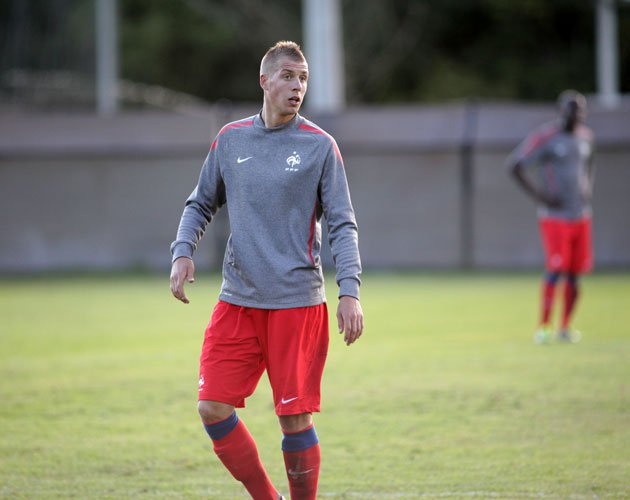
- Lejeune with France U20 in 2011

Personal information
- Full name: Florian Grégoire Claude Lejeune
- Date of birth: 20 May 1991 (age 35)
- Place of birth: Paris, France
- Height: 1.90 m (6 ft 3 in)
- Position: Centre-back

Team information
- Current team: Rayo Vallecano
- Number: 24

Youth career
- 1997–1998: CFF Paris
- 1998–2000: Ternes Paris
- 2000–2005: Racing Levallois
- 2005–2006: Béziers Cheminots
- 2006–2008: Sète
- 2008–2009: Agde

Senior career*
Years	Team	Apps	(Gls)
2008–2009	Agde	3	(2)
2009–2011	Istres	42	(3)
2011–2014	Villarreal B	36	(2)
2011–2014	Villarreal	19	(0)
2013–2014	→ Brest (loan)	21	(0)
2014–2015	Girona	38	(4)
2015–2016	Manchester City	0	(0)
2015–2016	→ Girona (loan)	38	(3)
2016–2017	Eibar	34	(1)
2017–2021	Newcastle United	42	(2)
2020–2021	→ Alavés (loan)	34	(1)
2021–2023	Alavés	30	(0)
2022–2023	→ Rayo Vallecano (loan)	31	(4)
2023–	Rayo Vallecano	122	(7)

International career
2010–2011	France U20	7	(1)
- * Club domestic league appearances and goals as of 21 November 2026

Florian Grégoire Claude Lejeune (born 20 May 1991) is a French professional footballer who plays as a centre-back for La Liga club Rayo Vallecano.

== Career ==
=== Early career ===
Lejeune was born in Paris and began his football career in July 1998 at the Centre de Formation de Paris, a youth sporting club designed to cater only to footballers under the age of 19. After four months at the academy, he departed for Racing Club des Ternes, a local sporting club based in the 8th arrondissement of Paris. Lejeune spent two years at the club and, in 2000, was signed by Racing Club de France. He spent the majority of his youth career at the club and, after a five-year stay, moved down south to join Béziers Méditerranée Cheminots, a sports club more known for its athletics department. With Béziers, Lejeune played in the Championnat de France 14 ans Fédéraux league.

After one year at Béziers, Lejeune joined Sète's youth academy. After two years with the club, he signed an amateur contract with Adge, which was playing in the Championnat de France amateur, the fourth level of French football. Lejeune spent the majority of the 2008–09 season playing for the club's reserve team. Towards the end of the campaign, he was called up to the senior team and made his amateur debut on 11 April 2009, appearing as a substitute in a 3–1 defeat to Gazélec Ajaccio. On 23 May, he made his first start in a 3–2 victory over Gap. The following week, Lejeune scored both goals for Agde in a 2–2 draw with Fréjus Saint-Raphaël.

=== Istres ===
In the summer of 2009, Lejeune joined Ligue 2 club Istres on trial. After impressing in two friendly matches, he was signed to a three-year professional contract and joined the club's reserve team. Lejeune arrived at the club playing primarily in the defensive midfielder role, but ultimately switched to the centre-back position. His positive play during the fall season with the reserves led to the player being called up to the senior team in January 2010. Lejeune made his professional debut on 19 January in a league match against Guingamp in a 0–0 draw with the player playing the entire match. Lejuene finished the campaign with 14 more appearances in the league playing the entire match in all of them.

Lejeune began the 2010–11 season as a starter and made his season debut in a 4–0 defeat to Ajaccio in the Coupe de la Ligue. In September, he was a surprise inclusion in the France under-20 team. His subsequent uprising into the spotlight and positive play with Istres led to the player being declared one of the best players in Ligue 2, despite only playing in a handful of matches. On 4 January 2011, French newspaper L'Équipe announced that Spanish club Real Madrid was monitoring Lejeune's progress. He was, subsequently, linked to a host of other clubs, notably English clubs Manchester United, Manchester City, and Arsenal and Italian clubs Napoli and Udinese with all the clubs reportedly likening him to former French international Laurent Blanc. However, despite the speculation, club president Francis Collado declared that he had not had official contact with any club linked to the player.

=== Villarreal ===
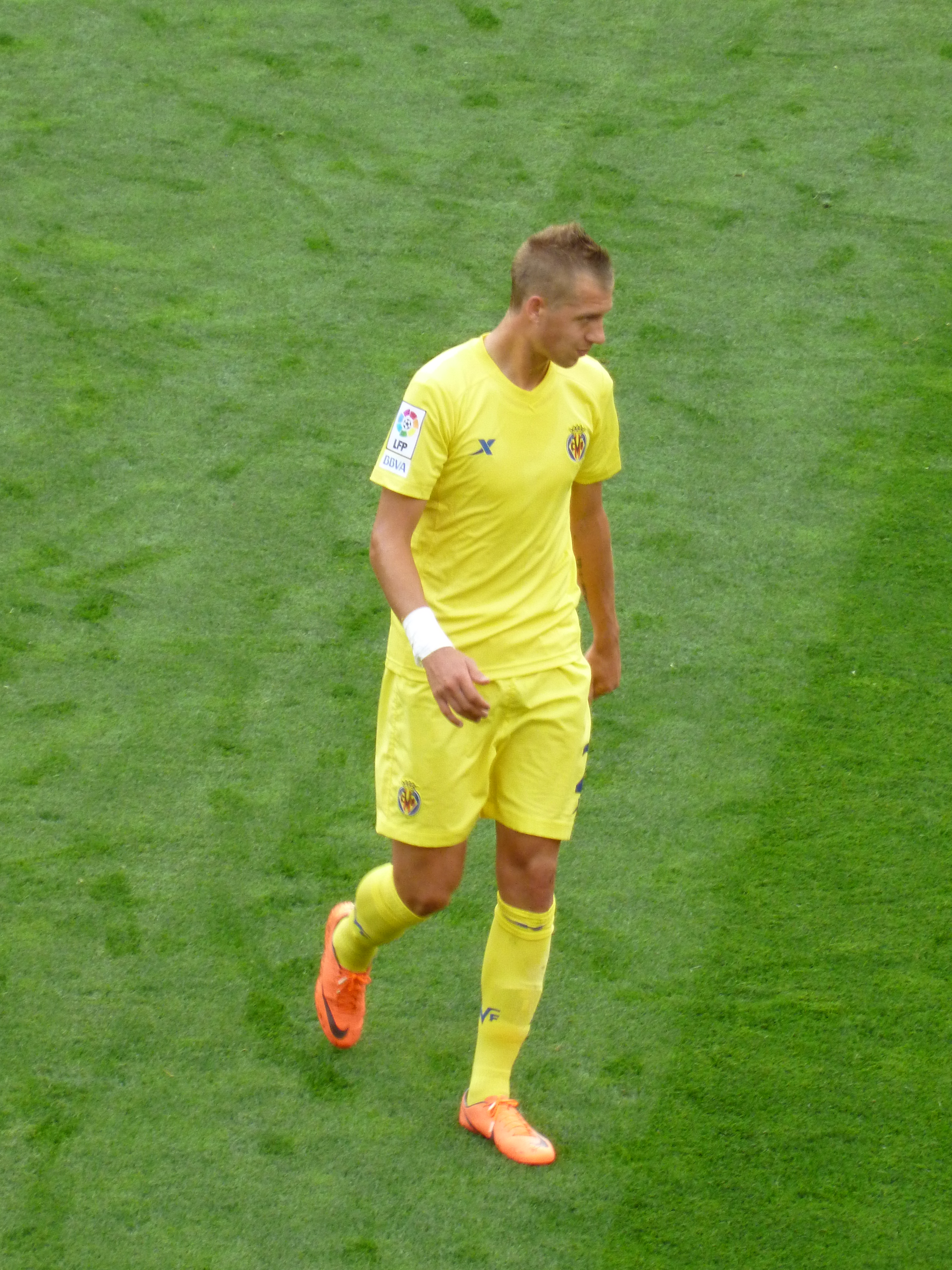
Lejeune playing for Villarreal B in 2012

On 7 July 2011, French newspaper L'Équipe confirmed that Lejeune had reached an agreement with Spanish club Villarreal to sign a four-year contract. The transfer fee was priced at €1 million and Lejeune completed his medical and signed his contract following the conclusion of his participation in the 2011 FIFA U-20 World Cup. He was placed with the club's second team. After appearing in seven matches with the B side, Lejeune made his senior team debut on 6 November 2011 appearing as a substitute in a 0–0 draw with Espanyol. In January 2013, he was loaned to Ligue 1 side Stade Brestois 29. It was announced in July 2013 that Lejeune would be loaned out to the newly relegated club for another year.

=== Girona ===
After his loan with Brest ended, Lejeune signed a two-year deal with Girona FC also in the second level. He was an undisputed first-choice for the Catalans, scoring his first goal on 8 February 2015, in a 1–0 win at CD Tenerife.

Lejeune finished the campaign with 40 appearances and five goals, as his side narrowly missed out on promotion in the play-offs.

=== Manchester City ===
On 28 August 2015, Lejeune was transferred to Manchester City and immediately loaned back to Girona for one year.

=== Eibar ===
On 29 June 2016, Lejeune signed a four-year deal with SD Eibar.

=== Newcastle United ===
On 4 July 2017, Lejeune joined newly-promoted English Premier League side Newcastle United on a five-year contract. In April 2019, he was ruled out of the rest of the 2018–19 season with a knee injury. Lejeune scored both of his first two goals for Newcastle in injury time of a 2–2 draw with Everton on 21 January 2020.

On 22 July 2021, Lejuene left Newcastle after a four-year spell with the club and 46 appearances in all competitions.

=== Alavés ===
On 11 September 2020, Lejeune signed for Spanish side Deportivo Alavés on a one-year loan deal. On 22 July 2021, he completed a permanent move to the club for an undisclosed fee.

=== Rayo Vallecano ===
On 29 July 2022, Lejeune joined fellow Spanish club Rayo Vallecano on a season-long loan. Roughly one year later, Rayo announced his permanent signing on a four-year deal, for a reported fee of €2.5 million.

== Career statistics ==
As of match played 21 November 2026

Appearances and goals by club, season and competition
Club	Season	League			National cup		League cup		Other		Total	
Club	Season	Division	Apps	Goals	Apps	Goals	Apps	Goals	Apps	Goals	Apps	Goals
Agde	2008–09	CFA	3	2	0	0	—		—		3	2
Istres	2009–10	Ligue 2	14	0	0	0	0	0	—		14	0
Istres	2010–11	Ligue 2	28	3	0	0	1	0	—		29	3
Istres	Total		42	3	0	0	1	0	—		43	3
Villarreal B	2011–12	Segunda División	27	2	—		—		—		27	2
Villarreal B	2012–13	Segunda División B	9	0	—		—		—		9	0
Villarreal B	Total		36	2	—		—		—		36	2
Villarreal	2011–12	La Liga	2	0	0	0	—		—		2	0
Villarreal	2012–13	Segunda División	3	0	0	0	—		—		3	0
Villarreal	Total		5	0	0	0	—		—		5	0
Brest	2012–13	Ligue 1	10	0	1	0	0	0	—		11	0
Brest	2013–14	Ligue 2	11	0	2	0	1	0	—		14	0
Brest	Total		21	0	3	0	1	0	—		25	0
Girona	2014–15	Segunda División	38	4	0	0	—		2 (Note: Appearances in the 2015 Segunda División play-offs)	1	40	5
Girona	2015–16	Segunda División	38	3	0	0	—		3 (Note: Appearances in the 2016 Segunda División play-offs)	0	41	3
Girona	Total		76	7	0	0	—		5	1	81	8
Eibar	2016–17	La Liga	34	1	3	0	—		—		37	1
Newcastle United	2017–18	Premier League	24	0	0	0	0	0	—		24	0
Newcastle United	2018–19	Premier League	12	0	1	0	0	0	—		13	0
Newcastle United	2019–20	Premier League	6	2	3	0	0	0	—		9	2
Newcastle United	Total		42	2	4	0	0	0	—		46	2
Alavés	2020–21	La Liga	34	1	2	0	—		—		36	1
Alavés	2021–22	La Liga	30	0	1	0	—		—		31	0
Alavés	Total		64	1	3	0	—		—		67	1
Rayo Vallecano (loan)	2022–23	La Liga	31	4	1	0	—		—		32	4
Rayo Vallecano	2023–24	La Liga	37	3	1	0	—		—		38	3
Rayo Vallecano	2024–25	La Liga	37	2	1	0	—		—		38	2
Rayo Vallecano	2025–26	La Liga	36	2	3	0	—		15 (Note: Appearances in UEFA Conference League)	1	54	3
Rayo Vallecano	2026–27	La Liga	12	0	1	0	—		—		13	0
Rayo Vallecano	Rayo Vallecano total		153	11	7	0	—		15	1	175	12
Career total			476	29	20	0	2	0	20	2	518	31

== Honours ==
Rayo Vallecano

- UEFA Conference League runner-up: 2025–26

Individual

- UEFA Conference League Team of the Season: 2025–26
