= Valdeganga =

Municipality of Spain

Coordinates: 39°09′N 1°40′W

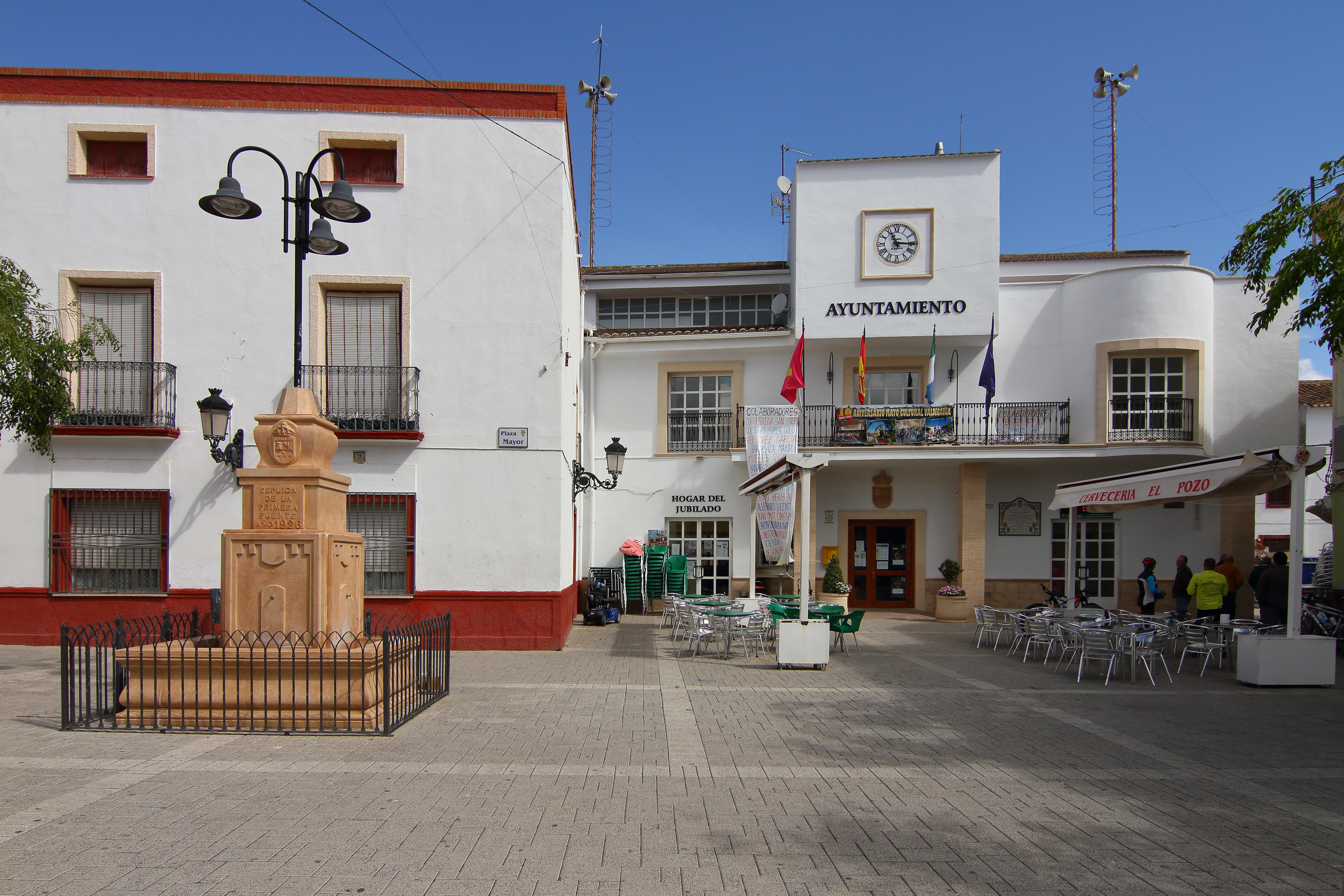

Flag of Valdeganga

Coat of arms of Valdeganga

Valdeganga is a municipality in Albacete, Castile-La Mancha, Spain. It has a population of 1,936.
