= Sergio Marcos =

Spanish footballer

Personal information
- Full name: Sergio Marcos González
- Date of birth: 3 February 1992 (age 34)
- Place of birth: Sacedón, Spain
- Height: 1.78 m (5 ft 10 in)
- Position: Midfielder

Team information
- Current team: Alcalá

Youth career
- Atlético Madrid

Senior career*
Years	Team	Apps	(Gls)
2009–2012	Atlético Madrid B	87	(1)
2012–2015	Villarreal B	84	(2)
2015–2016	Villarreal	7	(0)
2015–2016	→ Lugo (loan)	33	(1)
2016–2018	Valladolid	22	(0)
2018–2021	Cultural Leonesa	95	(9)
2021–2022	Racing Santander	27	(0)
2022–2023	Hércules	17	(0)
2023–2024	Guadalajara	17	(3)
2024–	Alcalá	64	(1)
- * Club domestic league appearances and goals as of 7 May 2026

Sergio Marcos González (born 3 February 1992) is a Spanish footballer who plays as a central midfielder for RSD Alcalá.

== Club career ==
Marcos was born in Sacedón, Province of Guadalajara, Castilla–La Mancha, and graduated from Atlético Madrid's youth academy. He made his debut as a senior with the reserves in the Segunda División B.

In summer 2012, Marcos moved to another reserve team, Villarreal CF B also of the third division. He was appointed their captain at the start of the 2014–15 season.

Marcos first appeared with the main squad in competitive matches on 15 February 2015, starting in a 2–0 La Liga away loss against Rayo Vallecano. On 9 July, he was loaned to Segunda División club CD Lugo in a season-long deal.

Marcos scored his first professional goal on 8 November 2015, the game's only in a 1–0 away victory over Girona FC. On 21 July of the following year, he was transferred to Real Valladolid also in division two after agreeing to a three-year contract; midway through the 2017–18 campaign, he left for fellow second-tier side Cultural y Deportiva Leonesa.

In June 2021, Marcos signed for Racing de Santander. Having achieved promotion to the second division in his only season, contributing 27 games but only starting six, he automatically renewed his contract; shortly after, however, he was deemed surplus to requirements by new manager Guillermo Fernández Romo and left.

Marcos subsequently dropped down to the Segunda Federación, where he represented Hércules CF and CD Guadalajara.

== Career statistics ==
As of match played 25 April 2021

Appearances and goals by club, season and competition
Club	Season	League			National Cup		Other		Total	
Club	Season	Division	Apps	Goals	Apps	Goals	Apps	Goals	Apps	Goals
Atlético Madrid B	2009–10	Segunda División B	22	0	—		—		22	0
Atlético Madrid B	2010–11	Segunda División B	36	1	—		—		36	1
Atlético Madrid B	2011–12	Segunda División B	29	0	—		—		29	0
Atlético Madrid B	Total		87	1	0	0	0	0	87	1
Villarreal B	2012–13	Segunda División B	23	0	—		—		23	0
Villarreal B	2013–14	Segunda División B	34	1	—		—		34	1
Villarreal B	2014–15	Segunda División B	27	1	—		—		27	1
Villarreal B	Total		84	2	0	0	0	0	84	2
Villarreal	2014–15	La Liga	7	0	0	0	—		7	0
Lugo (loan)	2015–16	Segunda División	33	1	0	0	—		33	1
Valladolid	2016–17	Segunda División	22	0	4	0	—		26	0
Valladolid	2017–18	Segunda División	0	0	4	0	—		4	0
Valladolid	Total		22	0	8	0	0	0	30	0
Cultural Leonesa	2017–18	Segunda División	18	2	0	0	—		18	2
Cultural Leonesa	2018–19	Segunda División B	33	3	3	0	—		36	3
Cultural Leonesa	2019–20	Segunda División B	22	1	3	0	2 (Note: Appearances in Segunda División B play-offs)	0	27	1
Cultural Leonesa	2020–21	Segunda División B	22	3	1	0	—		23	3
Cultural Leonesa	Total		95	9	7	0	2	0	104	9
Career total			328	13	15	0	2	0	345	13
