= Samuel Llorca =

Spanish footballer

Samuel
Personal information
- Full name: Samuel Llorca Ripoll
- Date of birth: 26 April 1985 (age 41)
- Place of birth: Alicante, Spain
- Height: 1.87 m (6 ft 2 in)
- Position: Centre-back

Youth career
- 1993–1996: San Blas Alto
- 1996–2004: Hércules

Senior career*
Years	Team	Apps	(Gls)
2004–2006	Hércules B		
2005–2006	→ Alone (loan)		
2006–2007	Elche B	42	(6)
2007–2011	Elche	126	(3)
2011–2012	Hércules	37	(5)
2012–2015	Celta	1	(0)
2014	→ Alavés (loan)	18	(1)
2014–2015	→ Valladolid (loan)	18	(0)
2015–2016	Valladolid	18	(1)
2016–2017	Racing Santander	33	(3)
2017–2020	Hércules	73	(5)
Total		366+	(24+)
- * Club domestic league appearances and goals

Samuel Llorca Ripoll (born 26 April 1985), known simply as Samuel, is a Spanish former professional footballer who played as a central defender.

He amassed Segunda División totals of 217 games and ten goals over nine seasons, in representation of four teams. He added one appearance in La Liga for Celta.

== Club career ==
Born in Alicante, Valencian Community, Samuel started his senior career at local Hércules CF, with its reserves. In 2005 he moved to amateur neighbours CD Alone de Guardamar, being an important unit as they retained their Tercera División status.

Samuel stayed in the region for the following season, signing with Elche CF Ilicitano in the same level. On 9 June 2007, courtesy of manager David Vidal, he made his debut with the first team, starting in a 1–0 home win against CD Castellón; he consolidated his position in the 2007–08 season with the club also in the Segunda División, and received abroad offers from England's Sheffield United and Fulham, which eventually died down.

In July 2011, Samuel joined his former side Hércules on a four-year contract. He scored a career-best five goals in his only season, and his team narrowly missed on top-flight promotion in the play-offs.

Samuel moved to La Liga in summer 2012, agreeing to a four-year deal at RC Celta de Vigo. He only appeared once in the competition, coming on as a second-half substitute for Mario Bermejo – following Gustavo Cabral's second yellow card and subsequent dismissal – in the Galician derby against Deportivo de La Coruña (1–1 home draw); on 30 June 2015, after dealing with a serious anterior cruciate ligament injury to his left knee and also having served second-tier loans at Deportivo Alavés and Real Valladolid, he left the Balaídos Stadium.

Samuel retired in 2020 aged 35, following Segunda División B spells at Racing de Santander and Hércules where he continued to deal with knee problems. His recovery was greatly hindered by the outbreak of the COVID-19 pandemic.
