= José Manuel Fernández =

Spanish footballer (born 1989)

Personal information
- Full name: José Manuel Fernández Reyes
- Date of birth: 18 November 1989 (age 36)
- Place of birth: Córdoba, Spain
- Height: 1.68 m (5 ft 6 in)
- Position: Right-back

Youth career
- Córdoba

Senior career*
Years	Team	Apps	(Gls)
2008–2011	Córdoba B	60	(0)
2011–2013	Córdoba	56	(0)
2013–2016	Zaragoza	68	(1)
2015–2016	→ Oviedo (loan)	19	(0)
2016–2017	Oviedo	28	(0)
2017–2020	Córdoba	74	(1)
2020–2021	AEK Larnaca	37	(0)
2021–2022	Hércules	19	(1)
Total		361	(3)
- * Club domestic league appearances and goals

José Manuel Fernández Reyes (born 18 November 1989 in Córdoba, Andalusia) is a Spanish former professional footballer who played as a right-back.
