= Eldin Hadžić =

Bosnian footballer

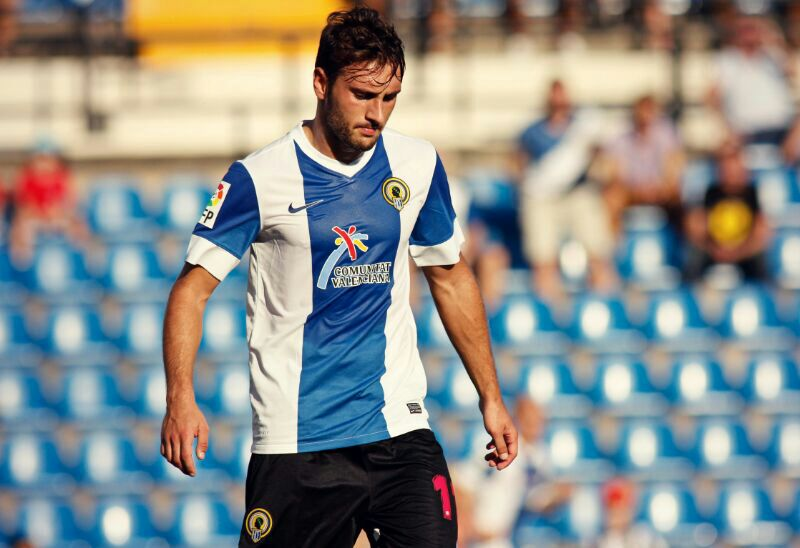

Personal information
- Full name: Eldin Hadžić
- Date of birth: 14 October 1991 (age 35)
- Place of birth: Ključ, SFR Yugoslavia
- Height: 1.73 m (5 ft 8 in)
- Position: Winger

Team information
- Current team: Intercity

Youth career
- 1999–2005: Sporting Saladar
- 2005–2009: Hércules

Senior career*
Years	Team	Apps	(Gls)
2009–2013	Hércules B	19	(7)
2010	→ Eibar (loan)	3	(0)
2011	→ Orihuela (loan)	15	(1)
2011–2012	→ Valencia B (loan)	11	(2)
2013–2014	Hércules	46	(11)
2014–2015	Zaragoza	32	(8)
2015–2016	Almería	12	(1)
2016–2017	Elche	14	(0)
2018–2019	Alcoyano	15	(2)
2019–	Intercity	6	(1)
- * Club domestic league appearances and goals as of 21:47, 4 December 2019 (UTC)

Eldin Hadžić (born 14 October 1991) is a Bosnian professional footballer who plays for Spanish club CF Intercity as a left winger.

== Early years ==
Hadžić was born in the village of Ključ, Republic of Bosnia and Herzegovina, Socialist Federal Republic of Yugoslavia. Due to the Bosnian War he and his family emigrated to Spain when he was just one year old, settling in Catral in the Province of Alicante.

== Club career ==
Hadžić began playing football with Sporting Saladar, a team in Almoradí, being noticed by scouts from Hércules CF and signed in 2005 at the age of 13. He was soon dubbed by club fans "Hércules" or simply "The Bosnian" and, in May 2010, shortly after having been noticed by La Liga giants Real Madrid, signed a three-year professional contract with the Alicante side, with a buyout clause of €5 million; he appeared in all the 2010–11 pre-season games but, after some difficulties in processing his Spanish nationality, left for SD Eibar of Segunda División B, on loan.

In the second half of the season, after receiving virtually no playing time in the Basque Country, Hadžić moved to another side in the third level, Orihuela CF, still owned by Hércules. In the summer of 2011, he joined third-tier Valencia CF Mestalla on loan, with an option to buy at the end of the campaign.

In March 2013, after having become a Spanish citizen the previous month, Hadžić was promoted to the main squad in the Segunda División. He made his professional debut on the 17th, coming on as a late substitute for Adrián Sardinero in a 3–1 home win against CE Sabadell FC.

Hadžić scored his first professional goal on 5 May 2013, netting the first in a 2–1 home victory over SD Huesca. He was an undisputed starter during the campaign, scoring nine goals in 35 matches but suffering relegation.

On 25 August 2014, Hadžić terminated his contract with Hércules and signed for Real Zaragoza in the following day. On 1 July 2015, he joined UD Almería also in the second level.

On 26 January 2016, Hadžić cut ties with the Andalusians and moved to another division two club, Elche CF.

== International career ==
In March 2010, Hadžić stated in Bosnian media that he would like to play for Bosnia and Herzegovina.
