= Jaime Romero =

Spanish footballer

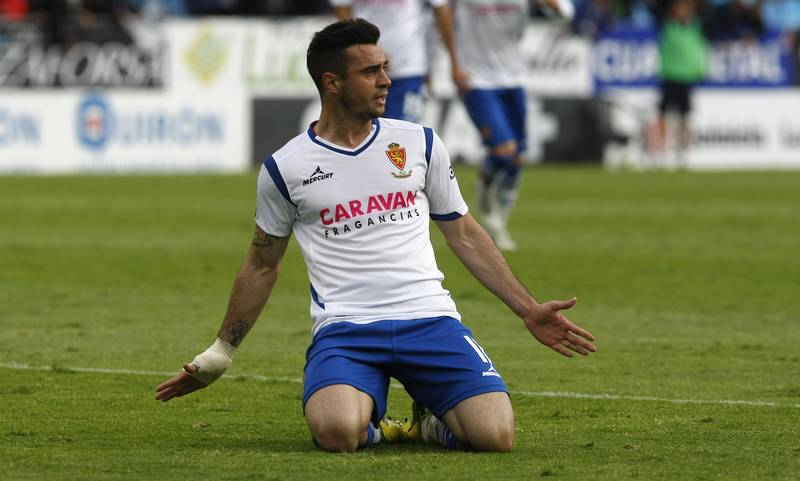
- Romero celebrates a goal for Zaragoza

Personal information
- Full name: Jaime Romero Gómez
- Date of birth: 31 July 1990 (age 36)
- Place of birth: Valdeganga, Spain
- Height: 1.76 m (5 ft 9 in)
- Position: Winger

Youth career
- Albacete

Senior career*
Years	Team	Apps	(Gls)
2008–2009	Albacete	36	(3)
2009–2016	Udinese	4	(0)
2010–2011	→ Bari (loan)	10	(0)
2011–2013	→ Granada (loan)	29	(1)
2013	→ Orduspor (loan)	11	(0)
2013–2014	→ Real Madrid B (loan)	32	(3)
2014–2016	→ Zaragoza (loan)	37	(8)
2016–2017	Osasuna	19	(0)
2017–2019	Córdoba	47	(2)
2018	→ Lugo (loan)	18	(2)
2019–2022	Qarabağ	36	(7)
2022	Cartagena	6	(0)
2023	Tractor	4	(0)

International career
2008	Spain U19	6	(0)
- * Club domestic league appearances and goals as of 22:45, 23 May 2023 (UTC)

Jaime Romero Gómez (born 31 July 1990) is a Spanish professional footballer who plays as a left winger.

He achieved Segunda División totals of 174 games and 18 goals over seven seasons, representing Albacete, Real Madrid Castilla, Zaragoza, Córdoba, Lugo and Cartagena. He totalled 48 La Liga appearances (one goal) for Granada and Osasuna, and also played professionally in Italy, Turkey, Azerbaijan and Iran.

== Club career ==
Born in Valdeganga, Province of Albacete, Romero made his professional debut with his hometown club Albacete Balompié in the 2008–09 season – aged only 18 – only missing six Segunda División games out of 42, starting 26 and totalling almost 2,400 minutes as the Castilla–La Mancha team retained their league status. His maiden appearance in the competition occurred on 31 August 2008 as a 75th minute substitute in the 2–1 home win against Sevilla Atlético, and he scored his first goal on 15 November, contributing to a 2–2 draw against UD Salamanca also at the Estadio Carlos Belmonte.

Romero signed for Udinese Calcio in Italy in summer 2009. He made four league appearances in his first year in Serie A, and mainly played with the under-20 side in the Campionato Nazionale Primavera.

In late June 2010, Udinese agreed a double loan contract with A.S. Bari, subject to Romero and Andrea Coda's decision. After appearing for the former during pre-season, the former eventually moved to the Apulia side on 2 August.

After appearing in less than one fourth of the league matches, and also suffering top-division relegation, Romero was loaned again, returning to his country and joining Granada CF. He made his La Liga debut on 27 August 2011, starting and being replaced in the second half of a 0–1 home loss to Real Betis.

After his loan with Granada expired, Romero represented Orduspor, Real Madrid Castilla and Real Zaragoza, all in temporary deals. On 4 July 2016, the free agent signed a two-year deal with top-flight CA Osasuna.

Romero cut ties with Osasuna on 19 June 2017, after suffering relegation. On 8 July, however, the club announced that they received € 500,000 in a transfer to Córdoba CF.

On 17 January 2018, Romero was loaned to fellow second-division team CD Lugo for six months. On 12 June of the following year, after another relegation, he left Andalusia.

On 23 June 2019, Romero signed a contract with Qarabağ FK. He returned to Spain and its second tier on 28 September 2022 after agreeing to a one-year deal at FC Cartagena, but left by mutual consent on 28 December after just 105 minutes of action from the bench in the league.

In February 2023, Romero moved to the Persian Gulf Pro League with Tractor SC, coached by his compatriot Paco Jémez.
