= Rubén González (footballer, born 1982) =

Spanish footballer

Personal information
- Full name: Rubén González Rocha
- Date of birth: 29 January 1982 (age 44)
- Place of birth: Compostela, Spain
- Height: 1.87 m (6 ft 2 in)
- Position: Centre-back

Youth career
- Conxo
- Compostela
- 1997–2001: Real Madrid

Senior career*
Years	Team	Apps	(Gls)
2001–2006	Real Madrid B	87	(4)
2002–2006	Real Madrid	4	(0)
2004	→ Borussia Mönchengladbach (loan)	3	(0)
2004–2005	→ Albacete (loan)	22	(0)
2006–2007	Racing Santander	34	(2)
2007–2009	Celta	70	(1)
2009–2011	Mallorca	31	(3)
2011–2013	Osasuna	27	(0)
2013–2014	Baku	23	(0)
2014–2016	Zaragoza	31	(1)
2016	Delhi Dynamos	13	(1)
2017	Coruxo	13	(0)
Total		358	(12)

International career
1999	Spain U16	6	(0)
1999	Spain U17	3	(0)
2000–2001	Spain U18	10	(0)
2001	Spain U20	1	(0)
2002–2003	Spain U21	8	(0)
Medal record
Representing Spain
UEFA European Under-16 Championship
Winner	1999 Czech Republic
- * Club domestic league appearances and goals

Rubén González Rocha (born 29 January 1982) is a Spanish former professional footballer who played as a central defender.

He came through the youth ranks at Real Madrid, but appeared in only 11 official matches in four years. He amassed La Liga totals of 118 games and five goals over ten seasons, also representing Albacete, Racing de Santander, Mallorca and Osasuna.

== Club career ==
González was born in Santiago de Compostela, Galicia. A youth product of La Liga powerhouse Real Madrid, who signed him from local SD Compostela at age 15, he would only total four first-team league appearances in three seasons, his debut coming on 10 May 2002 in a 3–0 away loss against Deportivo de La Coruña. On 9 November 2003, he was taken out after just 25 minutes and an own goal in an eventual 4–1 defeat at Sevilla FC; he finished 2003–04 on loan to German club Borussia Mönchengladbach, appearing rarely due to a shoulder injury.

After a loan period with Albacete Balompié in 2004–05, with the Castilla–La Mancha side finishing last in the top flight, Rubén returned to Real Madrid, spending the following campaign with the reserves in the Segunda División. In 2006–07 he finally developed as a top-division player with Racing de Santander, helping the Cantabrians to finish tenth while scoring his first goals in the competition in consecutive 2–1 wins, against RCD Mallorca and Villarreal CF; however, he returned the next year to division two, joining RC Celta de Vigo on a five-year contract.

In late August 2009, González signed for Mallorca, arriving for free in a 2+1 deal. In his first season, he was mostly a backup to José Nunes and Iván Ramis, but still managed to net twice, which resulted in four points away from home (2–1 defeat of Real Valladolid, 1–1 draw with Real Zaragoza); he added his third on 19 April 2010 – all came through headers from corner kicks – in a 2–0 home victory over CA Osasuna, as the Balearic Islands team finished fifth and qualified for the UEFA Europa League.

After one season with FC Baku in the Azerbaijan Premier League, González agreed to a two-year contract at Zaragoza on 12 August 2014, arriving from the same club as his compatriot Mario. On 3 September 2016, the 34-year-old moved to the Indian Super League with Delhi Dynamos FC.

González returned to his homeland in the 2017 January transfer window, signing with Coruxo FC from Segunda División B.

== Honours ==
Real Madrid

- La Liga: 2002–03
- Supercopa de España: 2003
- UEFA Champions League: 2001–02

Spain U16

- UEFA European Under-16 Championship: 1999
