= Pedro Sánchez (footballer, born 1986) =

Spanish association football player

Personal information
- Full name: Pedro Antonio Sánchez Moñino
- Date of birth: 12 December 1986 (age 39)
- Place of birth: Aspe, Spain
- Height: 1.78 m (5 ft 10 in)
- Position: Winger

Youth career
- Alicante

Senior career*
Years	Team	Apps	(Gls)
2005–2008	Alicante B	72	(25)
2008–2009	Alicante	27	(2)
2009–2012	Murcia	108	(20)
2012–2014	Córdoba	75	(13)
2014–2016	Zaragoza	69	(10)
2016–2017	Elche	30	(1)
2017–2018	Granada	38	(7)
2018–2019	Deportivo La Coruña	26	(4)
2019–2021	Albacete	35	(4)
2020–2021	→ Hércules (loan)	16	(3)
2021–2022	Hércules	24	(4)
2022–2023	Alcoyano	10	(0)
2023–2025	Betis Florida	49	(14)
- * Club domestic league appearances and goals as of 25 May 2025

Pedro Antonio Sánchez Moñino (born 12 December 1986) is a Spanish professional footballer who plays as a right winger.

He appeared in 358 matches in the Segunda División during his career, representing a host of clubs.

== Club career ==
Born in Aspe, Province of Alicante, Sánchez graduated from Alicante CF's youth setup, and made his senior debut with the reserves in 2005. He was definitely promoted to the main squad in summer 2008, and made his debut as a professional on 23 November, coming on as a second-half substitute in a 0–0 away draw against Rayo Vallecano in the Segunda División.

Sánchez scored his first professional goal on 1 March 2009, equalising an eventual 2–1 victory at SD Eibar. He finished the season with 27 appearances and two goals, as the Valencian team were relegated.

On 22 June 2009, Sánchez signed with Segunda División B club Real Murcia. In his second year he scored a career-best 13 goals, helping the Pimentoneros to return to the second tier at the first attempt.

On 17 July 2012, Sánchez joined Córdoba CF also in division two. He continued to compete in that league the following seasons, representing Real Zaragoza, Elche CF, Granada CF, Deportivo de La Coruña and Albacete Balompié.
