= Pablo Alcolea =

Spanish professional footballer

Personal information
- Full name: Pablo Alcolea Guerrero
- Date of birth: 23 March 1989 (age 37)
- Place of birth: Zaragoza, Spain
- Height: 1.84 m (6 ft 0 in)
- Position: Goalkeeper

Youth career
- Zaragoza

Senior career*
| Years | Team | Apps | (Gls) |
| 2008–2009 | Universidad Zaragoza | 10 | (0) |
| 2009–2013 | Zaragoza B | 58 | (0) |
| 2012–2017 | Zaragoza | 10 | (0) |
| 2016–2017 | → Toledo (loan) | 35 | (0) |
| 2017–2018 | Toledo | 32 | (0) |
| 2018–2019 | Salamanca | 9 | (0) |
| 2020 | Fuenlabrada | 0 | (0) |
| Total | | 154 | (0) |
- * Club domestic league appearances and goals

Pablo Alcolea Guerrero (born 23 March 1989) is a Spanish former professional footballer who played as a goalkeeper.

== Club career ==
Born in Zaragoza, Aragon, Alcolea played his first season as a senior with amateurs CD Universidad de Zaragoza, Real Zaragoza's farm team. He returned to the latter in the summer of 2009, going on to spend several years with the reserves.

On 22 February 2013, as first choice Roberto was unavailable due to injury, Alcolea was named on the bench for a La Liga match against Valencia CF. He made his debut in the competition the following day, replacing field player José Mari in the 79th minute of a 2–2 home draw after Leo Franco was sent off.

Alcolea was handed his first start on 1 March 2013, featuring in a 2–0 loss at Getafe CF. He was definitely promoted to the main squad in the 2013–14 campaign, being a backup to Franco.

On 20 July 2016, Alcolea was loaned to Segunda División B side CD Toledo for one year. On 31 July of the following year, he joined on a permanent basis after cutting ties with Zaragoza, signing a two-year contract shortly after, being a regular starter but also suffering relegation.

On 11 July 2018, Alcolea joined Salamanca CF UDS still in the third division. On 3 July 2020, after more than a year without a club, he returned to the second tier after agreeing to a short-term deal with CF Fuenlabrada.

== Career statistics ==
Appearances and goals by club, season and competition
| Club | Season | League | | | Cup | | Other | | Total | |
| Club | Season | Division | Apps | Goals | Apps | Goals | Apps | Goals | Apps | Goals |
|---|---|---|---|---|---|---|---|---|---|---|
| Zaragoza B | 2011–12 | Segunda División B | 26 | 0 | — | | 2 | 0 | 28 | 0 |
| Zaragoza B | 2012–13 | Segunda División B | 32 | 0 | — | | 2 | 0 | 34 | 0 |
| Zaragoza B | Total | | 58 | 0 | — | | 4 | 0 | 62 | 0 |
| Zaragoza | 2009–10 | La Liga | 0 | 0 | 0 | 0 | — | | 0 | 0 |
| Zaragoza | 2010–11 | La Liga | 0 | 0 | 0 | 0 | — | | 0 | 0 |
| Zaragoza | 2011–12 | La Liga | 0 | 0 | 0 | 0 | — | | 0 | 0 |
| Zaragoza | 2012–13 | La Liga | 2 | 0 | — | | — | | 2 | 0 |
| Zaragoza | 2013–14 | Segunda División | 0 | 0 | 1 | 0 | — | | 1 | 0 |
| Zaragoza | 2014–15 | Segunda División | 8 | 0 | 1 | 0 | 0 | 0 | 9 | 0 |
| Zaragoza | 2015–16 | Segunda División | 0 | 0 | 0 | 0 | — | | 0 | 0 |
| Zaragoza | Total | | 10 | 0 | 2 | 0 | 0 | 0 | 12 | 0 |
| Toledo (loan) | 2016–17 | Segunda División B | 35 | 0 | 1 | 0 | 2 | 0 | 38 | 0 |
| Toledo | 2017–18 | Segunda División B | 32 | 0 | 0 | 0 | — | | 32 | 0 |
| Toledo | Toledo total | | 67 | 0 | 1 | 0 | 2 | 0 | 70 | 0 |
| Salamanca | 2018–19 | Segunda División B | 9 | 0 | — | | — | | 9 | 0 |
| Fuenlabrada | 2019–20 | Segunda División | 0 | 0 | 0 | 0 | — | | 0 | 0 |
| Career total | | | 144 | 0 | 3 | 0 | 6 | 0 | 153 | 0 |
