= Albert Dorca =

Spanish footballer

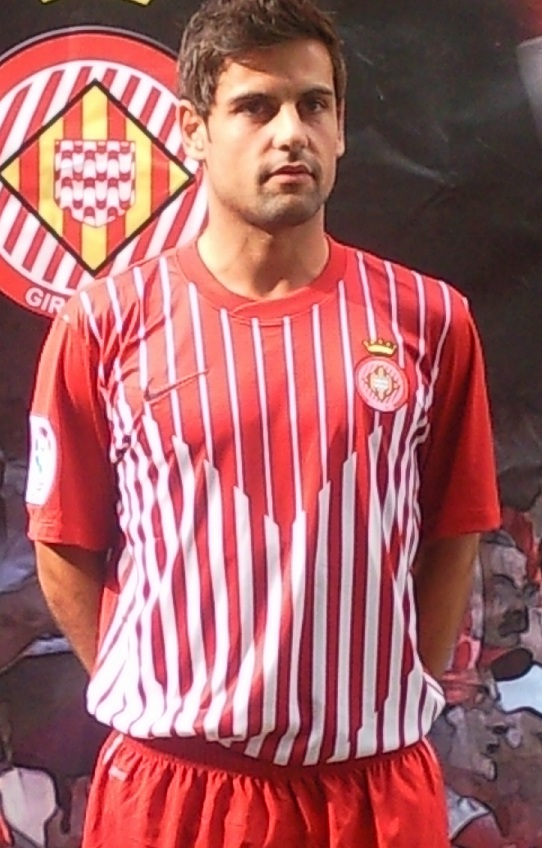
- Dorca as a Girona player in 2011

Personal information
- Full name: Albert Dorca Masó
- Date of birth: 23 December 1982 (age 43)
- Place of birth: Olot, Spain
- Height: 1.83 m (6 ft 0 in)
- Position: Midfielder

Youth career
- Olot
- 1997–2001: Barcelona

Senior career*
Years	Team	Apps	(Gls)
1999–2003	Barcelona C	80	(4)
2003–2004	Palamós	35	(0)
2004–2005	Castelldefels		
2005–2012	Girona	210	(11)
2012–2013	Racing Santander	22	(2)
2013–2014	Murcia	41	(3)
2014–2016	Zaragoza	78	(3)
2016–2017	Elche	31	(1)
2017–2020	Alcorcón	100	(9)
2020–2022	Cornellà	58	(4)
Total		655	(37)
- * Club domestic league appearances and goals

Albert Dorca Masó (born 23 December 1982) is a Spanish former professional footballer who played as a central midfielder.

== Club career ==
Born in Olot, Girona, Catalonia, Dorca played 418 Segunda División matches as a professional after spending his youth career at FC Barcelona. He represented Girona FC, Racing de Santander, Real Murcia CF, Real Zaragoza, Elche CF and AD Alcorcón.

Dorca made his debut in the competition on 30 August 2008 as a Girona player, featuring 90 minutes in the 1–0 away win against RC Celta de Vigo. In the 2017–18 season he scored a career-best seven goals to help Alcorcón to finish in 13th position and, one month shy of his 36th birthday, renewed his contract until 30 June 2020.

After two years with lowly UE Cornellà (Segunda División B, Primera Federación), Dorca retired aged 39. He then moved to the newly created seven-a-side Kings League.

== Personal life ==
Dorca majored in industrial engineering at the Polytechnic University of Catalonia. In 2016, he became the father of twin daughters.
