= 2012–13 NextGen Series =

Tournament details
- Dates: 15 August 2012 – 1 April 2013
- Teams: 24 (from 1 confederation)

Final positions
- Champions: (England) Aston Villa (1st title)
- Runners-up: (England) Chelsea
- Third place: (Portugal) Sporting CP
- Fourth place: (England) Arsenal

Tournament statistics
- Matches played: 88
- Goals scored: 268 (3.05 per match)
- Top scorer(s): (Republic of Ireland) Graham Burke (Scotland) Islam Feruz (7 goals)
- Best player: (England) Lewis Baker

The 2012–13 NextGen Series was the second season of the NextGen Series. The tournament involved the under-19 teams from 24 European countries. The tournament was won by Aston Villa who overcame Chelsea in the final.

== Format changes ==
From the previous season's competition, one major format change was announced, with the competition moving from a 16-team to a 24-team affair. The group stage was run in six groups of four, an expansion of the same format as the previous season.

== Teams ==
The 24 teams were sorted into six groups, where they played each other home and away in a Round-robin tournament. The top teams advanced to the finals of the competition.

Fifteen of the 16 founder-members reprise their roles, consisting of some of the highest-reputations teams from across UEFA, mirroring the current or recent Champions League involvement of their first teams. Only Basel of Switzerland declined the invitation to reappear.

- (England) Aston Villa
- (England) Liverpool
- (England) Manchester City
- (England) Tottenham Hotspur
- (Spain) Barcelona
- (Germany) Wolfsburg
- (Italy) Internazionale
- (Portugal) Sporting CP
- (France) Marseille
- (Netherlands) Ajax
- (Netherlands) PSV Eindhoven
- (Turkey) Fenerbahçe
- (Scotland) Celtic
- (Norway) Molde
- (Norway) Rosenborg

They were joined by a further nine teams of high standing for the expanded series.

- (England) Arsenal
- (England) Chelsea
- (Spain) Athletic Bilbao
- (Germany) Borussia Dortmund
- (Italy) Juventus
- (France) Paris Saint-Germain
- (Russia) CSKA Moscow
- (Greece) Olympiacos
- (Belgium) Anderlecht

== Group stage ==
The 24 teams were sorted into six groups of four, where they play each other home and away in a double round robin format. The top-two teams from each group progressed to the knock-out stages of the competition alongside the four highest points-scoring third-place finishers.

Key to colours in group tables
Group winners, runners-up and four best third placed teams advance to the round of 16

=== Group 1 ===
Team	Pld	W	D	L	GF	GA	GD	Pts
(Spain) Barcelona	6	3	2	1	12	6	+6	11
(Belgium) Anderlecht	6	2	3	1	8	6	+2	9
(England) Tottenham Hotspur	6	2	2	2	10	10	0	8
(Germany) Wolfsburg	6	1	1	4	9	17	−8	4

Kickoff times are in CET.

16 August 2012
20:00

Barcelona (Spain)	1–1	(Belgium) Anderlecht
Sanabria 80'	Report	Kabasele 66'

Mini Estadi, Barcelona
Referee: Rafael Díaz Melero (Spain)

22 August 2012
18:30

Wolfsburg (Germany)	2–3	(England) Tottenham Hotspur
Hauck 17' (pen.); Brandt 90+1'	Report	Coulthirst 63'; Lameiras 79'; Pritchard 82'

VfL-Stadion am Elsterweg, Wolfsburg
Attendance: 693

12 September 2012
19:30

Anderlecht (Belgium)	1–2	(Germany) Wolfsburg
Bruno 71'	Report	Avdijaj 21'; Hauck 33'

Constant Vanden Stock Stadium, Anderlecht

13 September 2012
20:00

Tottenham Hotspur (England)	0–2	(Spain) Barcelona
	Report	Sandro 19', 73'

White Hart Lane, London
Attendance: 8,850

3 October 2012
17:30

Wolfsburg (Germany)	0–5	(Spain) Barcelona
	Report	Calvet 12'; Quesada 52'; Ebwelle 78'; Joel Huertas 90'; Herrera 90'

VfL-Stadion am Elsterweg, Wolfsburg

10 October 2012
19:30

Anderlecht (Belgium)	0–0	(Spain) Barcelona
	Report

Constant Vanden Stock Stadium, Anderlecht

24 October 2012
14:00

Tottenham Hotspur (England)	2–2	(Germany) Wolfsburg
Pritchard 8', 35'	Report	Hauck 84'; Müller 90'

Hotspur Way, London

31 October 2012
20:30

Anderlecht (Belgium)	1–1	(England) Tottenham Hotspur
Álvarez 76'	Report	Bentaleb 59'

Constant Vanden Stock Stadium, Anderlecht
Attendance: 7,261

7 November 2012
17:45

Barcelona (Spain)	1–4	(England) Tottenham Hotspur
Bagnack 88'	Report	Coulthirst 25', 29', 60'; Pritchard 72'

Mini Estadi, Barcelona
Attendance: 295

21 November 2012
17:45

Barcelona (Spain)	3–1	(Germany) Wolfsburg
Traoré 16'; Sandro 45'; Ebwelle 90'	Report	Palacios Martínez 86'

Mini Estadi, Barcelona

28 November 2012
20:00

Wolfsburg (Germany)	2–3	(Belgium) Anderlecht
Brandt 68'; Uzan 90+1'	Report	Dendoncker 14'; Kabasele 34'; Heylen 37'

VfL-Stadion am Elsterweg, Wolfsburg

13 December 2012
14:00

Tottenham Hotspur (England)	0–2	(Belgium) Anderlecht
	Report	Dendoncker 59'; Heylen 83' (pen.)

Hotspur Way, London

=== Group 2 ===
Team	Pld	W	D	L	GF	GA	GD	Pts
(France) Paris Saint-Germain	6	4	1	1	10	5	+5	13
(Italy) Juventus	6	3	3	0	13	9	+4	12
(England) Manchester City	6	1	2	3	8	10	−2	5
(Turkey) Fenerbahçe	6	0	2	4	6	13	−7	2

Kickoff times are in CET.

29 August 2012
20:30

Juventus (Italy)	3–3	(Turkey) Fenerbahçe
Padovan 27', 50'; Lanini 90+4'	Report	Şimşek 38', 75' (pen.); Sahat 85'

Stadio Giuseppe Moccagatta, Alessandria

30 August 2012
20:00

Manchester City (England)	0–2	(France) Paris Saint-Germain
	Report	Rajsel 28', 77'

Ewen Fields, Hyde

13 September 2012
20:00

Manchester City (England)	3–1	(Turkey) Fenerbahçe
Suárez 69' (pen.); Huws 71'; Hiwula 90' (pen.)	Report	Çinemre 11'

Ewen Fields, Hyde
Attendance: 737
Referee: Darren Handley (England)

19 September 2012
17:30

Juventus (Italy)	2–0	(France) Paris Saint-Germain
Ruggiero 57'; Léo Bonatini 90'	Report

Stadio Giuseppe Moccagatta, Alessandria

4 October 2012
17:00

Fenerbahçe (Turkey)	1–1	(England) Manchester City
Leigh 68' (o.g.)	Report	Suárez 49'

Maltepe Stadý, Istanbul

24 October 2012
14:00

Fenerbahçe (Turkey)	0–2	(France) Paris Saint-Germain
	Report	Coman 18'; Ongenda 55'

Maltepe Stadý, Istanbul

31 October 2012
18:00

Juventus (Italy)	1–1	(England) Manchester City
Rugani 84'	Report	Meppen-Walter 42'

Stadio Giuseppe Moccagatta, Alessandria

7 November 2012
18:00

Paris Saint-Germain (France)	2–0	(Turkey) Fenerbahçe
Sainrimat-Moreira 7'; Yaisien 65'	Report

Stade Georges Lefèvre, Paris

8 November 2012
19:00

Manchester City (England)	2–3	(Italy) Juventus
Pozo 15'; Lopes 81'	Report	Schiavone 29'; Magnússon 62'; Léo Bonatini 71'

Ewen Fields, Hyde

28 November 2012
18:30

Paris Saint-Germain (France)	2–1	(England) Manchester City
Bourdin 29'; Habran 63'	Report	Lopes 77' (pen.)

Stade Georges Lefèvre, Paris

5 December 2012
13:00

Fenerbahçe (Turkey)	1–2	(Italy) Juventus
Cici 57'	Report	Gerbaudo 25'; Schiavone 81'

Maltepe Stadý, Istanbul

19 December 2012
17:00

Paris Saint-Germain (France)	2–2	(Italy) Juventus
Yaisien 33'; Coman 42'	Report	Beltrame 78'; Gerbaudo 90'

Stade Georges Lefèvre, Paris

=== Group 3 ===
Team	Pld	W	D	L	GF	GA	GD	Pts
(Russia) CSKA Moscow	6	4	0	2	8	5	+3	12
(Netherlands) Ajax	6	3	2	1	15	6	+9	11
(England) Chelsea	6	2	3	1	12	6	+6	9
(Norway) Molde	6	0	1	5	2	20	−18	1

Kickoff times are in CET.

16 August 2012
14:00

CSKA Moscow (Russia)	2–1	(Norway) Molde
Seredin 29'; Litvinov 74'	Report	Svendsen 27'

October Stadium, Moscow

28 August 2012
19:00

Chelsea (England)	1–2	(Russia) CSKA Moscow
Bamford 11'	Report	Zaseev 35'; Dergachev 38'

Cobham Training Centre, Cobham

13 September 2012
20:00

Molde (Norway)	0–1	(Russia) CSKA Moscow
	Report	Zaseev 54'

Aker Stadion, Molde

19 September 2012
19:00

Molde (Norway)	0–5	(Netherlands) Ajax
	Report	De Sa 14'; Fischer 19', 65', 81'; Sporkslede 90+3'

Aker Stadion, Molde

3 October 2012
14:00

CSKA Moscow (Russia)	0–1	(England) Chelsea
	Report	Boga 71'

October Stadium, Moscow

4 October 2012
19:00

Ajax (Netherlands)	5–0	(Norway) Molde
Kishna 11'; Fischer 31'; El Hasnaoui 37', 67'; Keskin 90'	Report

De Toekomst, Amsterdam

30 October 2012
11:00

CSKA Moscow (Russia)	2–0	(Netherlands) Ajax
Khurtsidze 45'; Georgievskiy 75'	Report

October Stadium, Moscow

31 October 2012
18:00

Molde (Norway)	1–1	(England) Chelsea
Aboubacar 60'	Report	Ssewankambo 87'

Aker Stadion, Molde

6 November 2012
18:00

Ajax (Netherlands)	2–1	(Russia) CSKA Moscow
Menig 44'; Van den Boomen 59'	Report	Netfullin 28'

De Toekomst, Amsterdam

8 November 2012
18:00

Chelsea (England)	6–0	(Norway) Molde
Feruz 13', 22'; Kiwomya 57'; Mitchell 66'; Piazon 68'; Saville 70'	Report

Cobham Training Centre, Cobham

12 December 2012
21:00

Chelsea (England)	0–0	(Netherlands) Ajax
	Report

Recreation Ground, Aldershot

29 January 2013
19:00

Ajax (Netherlands)	3–3	(England) Chelsea
Bitter 16'; De Sa 61' (pen.); De Bondt 89'	Report	Kiwomya 12'; Feruz 39', 49'

De Toekomst, Amsterdam

=== Group 4 ===
Team	Pld	W	D	L	GF	GA	GD	Pts
(Portugal) Sporting CP	6	4	0	2	12	11	+1	12
(England) Aston Villa	6	3	1	2	12	8	+4	10
(Netherlands) PSV Eindhoven	6	3	0	3	6	9	−3	9
(Scotland) Celtic	6	1	1	4	8	10	-2	4

Kickoff times are in CET.

16 August 2012
20:00

Aston Villa (England)	1–3	(Portugal) Sporting CP
Drennan 31'	Report	Ié 32'; Mané 39'; Riquicho 63' (pen.)

Villa Park, Birmingham

29 August 2012
18:30

PSV Eindhoven (Netherlands)	1–0	(England) Aston Villa
Antonio 34'	Report

De Herdgang, Eindhoven

6 September 2012
20:30

Celtic (Scotland)	1–2	(Portugal) Sporting CP
Johnstone 20'	Report	Medeiros 45'; Cortez 76'

Firhill Stadium, Glasgow

19 September 2012
20:00

Aston Villa (England)	2–1	(Scotland) Celtic
Carruthers 21'; Melvin 35'	Report	Irvine 49'

Villa Park, Birmingham

26 September 2012
19:00

PSV Eindhoven (Netherlands)	1–0	(Portugal) Sporting CP
Vloet 75'	Report

De Herdgang, Eindhoven

3 October 2012
19:00

Celtic (Scotland)	3–1	(Netherlands) PSV Eindhoven
F. Twardzik 11' (pen.); McGregor 13'; Herron 16'	Report	Antonio 44'

Firhill Stadium, Glasgow

24 October 2012
19:00

Celtic (Scotland)	2–2	(England) Aston Villa
Devine 53' (o.g.); P. Twardzik 72'	Report	Graham 24'; Drennan 39'

Firhill Stadium, Glasgow

24 October 2012
19:30

Sporting CP (Portugal)	4–2	(Netherlands) PSV Eindhoven
Ponde 18'; Mané 57'; Medeiros 73'; Veloso 90'	Report	Sanoh 25'; Pinto 64' (o.g.)

Alvalade Stadium, Lisbon

7 November 2012
19:00

Aston Villa (England)	2–0	(Netherlands) PSV Eindhoven
Burke 19'; Drennan 84'	Report

Villa Park, Birmingham

21 November 2012
18:30

Sporting CP (Portugal)	2–1	(Scotland) Celtic
Mané 8'; Medeiros 24'	Report	Kidd 40'

Alvalade Stadium, Lisbon

28 November 2012
18:00

PSV Eindhoven (Netherlands)	1–0	(Scotland) Celtic
Brenet 83'	Report

Philips Stadion, Eindhoven

28 November 2012
19:30

Sporting CP (Portugal)	1–5	(England) Aston Villa
Veloso 75'	Report	Donacien 10'; Drennan 49', 88'; Burke 55', 78'

Alvalade Stadium, Lisbon

=== Group 5 ===
Team	Pld	W	D	L	GF	GA	GD	Pts
(Italy) Internazionale	6	3	1	2	10	10	0	10
(Norway) Rosenborg	6	3	1	2	10	10	0	10
(England) Liverpool	6	3	0	3	14	10	+4	9
(Germany) Borussia Dortmund	6	1	2	3	5	9	-4	5

Kickoff times are in CET.

19 September 2012
15:00

Internazionale (Italy)	3–2	(England) Liverpool
Forte 19'; Belloni 45'; Garritano 80'	Report	Adorján 30' (pen.), 88'

Centro Sportivo Giacinto Facchetti, Milan

26 September 2012
19:00

Internazionale (Italy)	1–0	(Germany) Borussia Dortmund
Benassi 69'	Report

Stadio Città di Meda, Meda

17 October 2012
19:00

Rosenborg (Norway)	1–0	(Germany) Borussia Dortmund
Sakor 25'	Report

Lerkendal Stadium, Trondheim

31 October 2012
19:00

Borussia Dortmund (Germany)	2–1	(England) Liverpool
Nothnagel 30' (pen.); Bandowski 77'	Report	Coady 64'

Stadion Rote Erde, Dortmund

31 October 2012
19:00

Rosenborg (Norway)	2–1	(Italy) Internazionale
Sørloth 85'; Sakor 90' (pen.)	Report	Garritano 63'

Lerkendal Stadium, Trondheim

7 November 2012
18:00

Borussia Dortmund (Germany)	1–1	(Italy) Internazionale
Weber 36'	Report	Belloni 3'

Stadion Rote Erde, Dortmund

9 November 2012
18:00

Rosenborg (Norway)	3–0	(England) Liverpool
Blakstad 6'; Bjørnholm 14'; Sørloth 30'	Report

Lerkendal Stadium, Trondheim

13 November 2012
19:00

Liverpool (England)	4–1	(Norway) Rosenborg
Jones 15'; Morgan 32', 45+2'; Sinclair 90+1'	Report	Lundal 39'

Langtree Park, St Helens

21 November 2012
19:00

Borussia Dortmund (Germany)	2–2	(Norway) Rosenborg
Benkarit 19'; Beutler 67'	Report	Bjørnholm 3'; Blakstad 43'

Stadion Rote Erde, Dortmund

28 November 2012
19:00

Liverpool (England)	3–0	(Germany) Borussia Dortmund
Coady 22', 26' (pen.); Morgan 77'	Report

Langtree Park, St Helens

4 December 2012
14:30

Internazionale (Italy)	3–1	(Norway) Rosenborg
Forte 37', 85'; Pedrabissi 70'	Report	Blakstad 25'

Centro Sportivo Giacinto Facchetti, Milan
Referee: Francesco Di Stefano (Italy)

8 January 2013
20:00

Liverpool (England)	4–1	(Italy) Internazionale
Coady 29' (pen.), 77' (pen.); Yeşil 34', 65'	Report	Benassi 62'

Langtree Park, St Helens

=== Group 6 ===
Team	Pld	W	D	L	GF	GA	GD	Pts
(Greece) Olympiacos	6	2	3	1	4	5	−1	9
(England) Arsenal	6	2	2	2	7	5	+2	8
(France) Marseille	6	2	2	2	4	10	−6	8
(Spain) Athletic Bilbao	6	2	1	3	12	7	+5	7

Kickoff times are in CET.

28 August 2012
07:30

Athletic Bilbao (Spain)	4–0	(Greece) Olympiacos
Guillermo 27' (pen.); Jurgi Oteo 50'; Bengoa 59'; Santamaría 72'	Report

San Mamés, Bilbao
Attendance: 3000

29 August 2012
20:00

Arsenal (England)	3–0	(France) Marseille
Yennaris 8'; Akpom 20', 83'	Report

Underhill Stadium, London

12 September 2012
19:00

Marseille (France)	2–1	(Spain) Athletic Bilbao
Anani 45', 72'	Report	Jurgi Oteo 34'

Marcel-Cerdan Stadium, Marseille

12 September 2012
19:00

Olympiacos (Greece)	2–0	(England) Arsenal
Soukias 83'; Leandro 90'	Report

Karaiskakis Stadium, Piraeus-Athens

26 September 2012
19:00

Marseille (France)	0–0	(Greece) Olympiacos
	Report

Marcel-Cerdan Stadium, Marseille

4 October 2012
20:00

Arsenal (England)	0–0	(Greece) Olympiacos
	Report

Underhill Stadium, London

25 October 2012
17:00

Marseille (France)	1–0	(England) Arsenal
Kisaku 90+3'	Report

Marcel-Cerdan Stadium, Marseille

15 November 2012
18:30

Olympiacos (Greece)	1–1	(France) Marseille
Ioannidis 45'	Report	Diop 33'

Karaiskakis Stadium, Piraeus-Athens

15 November 2012
19:30

Athletic Bilbao (Spain)	0–0	(England) Arsenal
	Report

San Mamés, Bilbao

28 November 2012
16:30

Athletic Bilbao (Spain)	5–0	(France) Marseille
Santamaría 58', 80'; Williams 65'; Unai López 70'; Bechar 89' (o.g.)	Report

Lezama Facilities, Lezama(Biscay)

6 December 2012
20:00

Arsenal (England)	4–2	(Spain) Athletic Bilbao
Toral 7', 74'; Ansah 67'; Hayden 79'	Report	Aketxe 12'; Yeray 83'

Underhill Stadium, London

12 December 2012
19:00

Olympiacos (Greece)	1–0	(Spain) Athletic Bilbao
Gino 32'	Report

Karaiskakis Stadium, Piraeus-Athens

== Ranking of third-placed teams ==
Grp	Team	Pld	W	D	L	GF	GA	GD	Pts
3	(England) Chelsea	6	2	3	1	12	6	+6	9
5	(England) Liverpool	6	3	0	3	14	10	+4	9
4	(Netherlands) PSV Eindhoven	6	3	0	3	6	9	−3	9
1	(England) Tottenham Hotspur	6	2	2	2	10	10	0	8
6	(France) Marseille	6	2	2	2	4	10	−6	8
2	(England) Manchester City	6	1	2	3	8	10	−2	5

== Knockout stage ==
The knockout round matches were decided by ordering each team from 1 through 16, with the top ranked team facing the lowest ranked team, and on down.

Key to colours
Group winners
Runners-up
Four best third-placed teams

Seeded					Unseeded				
#	Team	Pts	GD	GF	#	Team	Pts	GD	GF
1.	(France) Paris Saint-Germain	13	+5	10	9.	(England) Aston Villa	10	+4	12
2.	(Russia) CSKA Moscow	12	+3	8	10.	(Norway) Rosenborg	10	0	10
3.	(Portugal) Sporting CP	12	+1	12	11.	(Belgium) Anderlecht	9	+2	8
4.	(Spain) Barcelona	11	+6	12	12.	(England) Arsenal	8	+2	7
5.	(Italy) Internazionale	10	0	10	13.	(England) Chelsea	9	+6	12
6.	(Greece) Olympiacos	9	−1	4	14.	(England) Liverpool	9	+4	14
7.	(Italy) Juventus	12	+4	13	15.	(Netherlands) PSV Eindhoven	9	−3	6
8.	(Netherlands) Ajax	11	+9	15	16.	(England) Tottenham Hotspur	8	0	10

=== Bracket ===
Round of 16
(Spain) Barcelona	0
(England) Chelsea	2
(Italy) Juventus	1
(Norway) Rosenborg	0
(Italy) Internazionale	0
(England) Arsenal	1
(Russia) CSKA Moscow	3
(Netherlands) PSV Eindhoven	0
(Netherlands) Ajax	1
(England) Aston Villa	2
(Greece) Olympiacos	2
(Belgium) Anderlecht	1
(France) Paris Saint-Germain	1 (3)
(England) Tottenham Hotspur (pen.)	1 (4)
(Portugal) Sporting CP	4
(England) Liverpool	0

Quarter-finals
(England) Chelsea	4
(Italy) Juventus	1
(England) Arsenal	1
(Russia) CSKA Moscow	0
(England) Aston Villa	1
(Greece) Olympiacos	0
(England) Tottenham Hotspur	3
(Portugal) Sporting CP (a.e.t.)	5

Semi-finals
(England) Chelsea (a.e.t.)	4
(England) Arsenal	3
(England) Aston Villa	3
(Portugal) Sporting CP	1

Final
(England) Chelsea	0
(England) Aston Villa	2
Third place match
(England) Arsenal	1
(Portugal) Sporting CP	3

=== Round of 16 ===
19 February 2013
19:00 CET

Ajax (Netherlands)	1–2	(England) Aston Villa
Anderson 14'	Report	Drennan 35'; Lewis 64'

De Toekomst, Amsterdam

20 February 2013
17:00 CET

Paris Saint-Germain (France)	1–1 (a.e.t.)	(England) Tottenham Hotspur
Sainrimat-Moreira 65'	Report	Coulthirst 34'
Penalties
	3–4

Stade Georges Lefèvre, Paris

20 February 2013
18:00 CET

Barcelona (Spain)	0–2	(England) Chelsea
	Report	Feruz 43'; Boga 90'

Mini Estadi, Barcelona

20 February 2013
20:00 CET

Sporting CP (Portugal)	4–0	(England) Liverpool
Mané 12', 24'; Palhinha 64'; Jancó 89'	Report

Estádio José Alvalade, Lisbon

27 February 2013
17:00 CET

CSKA Moscow (Russia)	3–0	(Netherlands) PSV Eindhoven
Bazelyuk 11', 22'; Georgievskiy 68'	Report

Akdeniz Stadium, Antalya

28 February 2013
18:00 CET

Olympiacos (Greece)	2–1	(Belgium) Anderlecht
Ioannidis 21', 53' (pen.)	Report	Acheampong 46'

Georgios Karaiskakis Stadium, Piraeus

6 March 2013
15:00 CET

Internazionale (Italy)	0–1	(England) Arsenal
	Report	Yennaris 69'

Centro Sportivo Giacinto Facchetti, Milan

7 March 2013
20:30 CET

Juventus (Italy)	1–0	(Norway) Rosenborg
Beltrame 29'	Report

Stadio Giuseppe Moccagatta, Alessandria

=== Quarterfinals ===
17 March 2013
13:30

Chelsea (England)	4–1	(Italy) Juventus
Kiwomya 11'; Baker 13', 89'; Feruz 83'	Report	Rugani 72'

Griffin Park, London

20 March 2013
20:00

Aston Villa (England)	1–0	(Greece) Olympiacos
Burke 11'	Report

Villa Park, Birmingham

20 March 2013
20:00

Tottenham Hotspur (England)	3–5 (a.e.t.)	(Portugal) Sporting CP
Oduwa 8'; Dombaxe 81' (pen.); Percil 90+3'	Report	Betinho 6', 17'; Semedo 64' (pen.); Guedes 96'; Fokobo 104'

Brisbane Road, London

25 March 2013
18:00

Arsenal (England)	1–0	(Russia) CSKA Moscow
Gnabry 56'	Report

Emirates Stadium, London
Attendance: 6,684

=== Semifinals ===
29 March 2013
17:30

Chelsea (England)	4–3 (a.e.t.)	(England) Arsenal
Feruz 53'; Baker 61', 116'; Boga 65'	Report	Akpom 16', 89'; Gnabry 90'

Stadio Giuseppe Sinigaglia, Como

29 March 2013
20:00

Aston Villa (England)	3–1 (a.e.t.)	(Portugal) Sporting CP
Burke 55'; Grealish 91'; Carruthers 105'	Report	Stojanović 68'

Stadio Giuseppe Sinigaglia, Como

=== Third place match ===
31 March 2013
13:00

Arsenal (England)	1–3	(Portugal) Sporting CP
Eisfeld 27'	Report	Jancó 34'; Semedo 55' (pen.); Esgaio 72'

Stadio Giuseppe Sinigaglia, Como

=== Final ===
1 April 2013
18:00

Chelsea (England)	0–2	(England) Aston Villa
	Report	Burke 49' (pen.), 90' (pen.)

Stadio Giuseppe Sinigaglia, Como

== Top goalscorers ==
Players and teams in bold are still active in the competition:

Rank	Name	Team	Goals
1	(Republic of Ireland) Graham Burke	(England) Aston Villa	7
1	(Scotland) Islam Feruz	(England) Chelsea	7
3	(Republic of Ireland) Michael Drennan	(England) Aston Villa	6
4	(England) Conor Coady	(England) Liverpool	5
4	(England) Shaq Coulthirst	(England) Tottenham Hotspur	5
4	(Guinea-Bissau) Carlos Mané	(Portugal) Sporting CP	5
7	(England) Chuba Akpom	(England) Arsenal	4
7	(England) Lewis Baker	(England) Chelsea	4
7	(Denmark) Viktor Fischer	(Netherlands) Ajax	4
7	(England) Alex Pritchard^{1}	(England) Tottenham Hotspur	4
11	(Norway) Magnus Blakstad	(Norway) Rosenborg	3
11	(Ivory Coast) Jeremie Boga	(England) Chelsea	3
11	(Italy) Francesco Forte	(Italy) Internazionale	3
11	(Germany) Philipp Hauck	(Germany) Wolfsburg	3
11	(Greece) Nikolaos Ioannidis	(Greece) Olympiacos	3
11	(England) Alex Kiwomya	(England) Chelsea	3
11	(Portugal) Iuri Medeiros	(Portugal) Sporting CP	3
11	(England) Adam Morgan	(England) Liverpool	3
11	(Spain) Sandro	(Spain) Barcelona	3
11	(Spain) Gorka Santamaría	(Spain) Athletic Bilbao	3

Note

1: In January 2013 Alex Pritchard moved on loan from Tottenham Hotspur to Peterborough United.

== See also ==
- 2012–13 UEFA Champions League
