= 2015–16 Bilbao Athletic season =

Bilbao Athletic
2015–16 season
- President: Josu Urrutia
- Head coach: José Ángel Ziganda
- Stadium: San Mamés
- Segunda División: 22nd (relegated)
- Top goalscorer: League: Ager Aketxe (8); All: Ager Aketxe (8)
- Biggest win: Bilbao Athletic 3–1 Mallorca; Bilbao Athletic 2–0 Llagostera; Bilbao Athletic 4–2 Ponferradina; Bilbao Athletic 2–0 Tenerife
- Biggest defeat: Bilbao Athletic 0–4 Gimnàstic
Home colours	Away colours

The 2015–16 season was the 52nd season in the existence of Bilbao Athletic and the club's first season back in the second division of Spanish football since the 1995–96 campaign 20 years earlier. During this season, Bilbao Athletic participated in the Segunda División, and also entered the season's edition of the invitational Premier League International Cup for age-restricted teams.

== Players ==
=== First-team squad ===
As of 1 February 2016

Note: Flags indicate national team as defined under FIFA eligibility rules; some limited exceptions apply. Players may hold more than one non-FIFA nationality.

No.	Pos.	Nation	Player
1	GK	ESP	Jon Ander Felipe
3	DF	ESP	Egoitz Magdaleno
4	DF	ESP	Jonás Ramalho
5	DF	ESP	Enric Saborit
6	DF	ESP	Óscar Gil
7	MF	ESP	Iker Guarrotxena
8	MF	ESP	Iker Undabarrena
9	FW	ESP	Gorka Santamaría
10	MF	ESP	Unai López
11	MF	ESP	Aitor Seguín
12	FW	ESP	Asier Villalibre
13	GK	ESP	Alejandro Remiro
14	MF	ESP	Jon Iru

No.	Pos.	Nation	Player
15	DF	ESP	Unai Bilbao
16	MF	ESP	Lander Olaetxea
17	MF	ESP	Jurgi Oteo
18	DF	ESP	Urtzi Iriondo
19	MF	ESP	Mikel Vesga
20	MF	ESP	Gorka Iturraspe
21	MF	ESP	Martín Bengoa
22	DF	ESP	Markel Etxeberria
23	DF	ESP	Yeray Álvarez
24	MF	ESP	Ager Aketxe
27	FW	ESP	Gorka Guruzeta
28	DF	ESP	Julen Arellano
30	MF	ESP	Iñigo Córdoba

== Transfers ==
=== In ===
Date	Name	Moving to	Fee
30 June 2015	(Spain) Julen Arellano	(Spain) FC Barcelona Juvenil A	Free
30 June 2015	(Spain) Enric Saborit	(Spain) RCD Mallorca	Loan return
30 June 2015	(Spain) Iker Guarrotxena	(Spain) CD Tenerife	Loan return

=== Out ===
Date	Name	Moving to	Fee
30 June 2015	(Spain) Mikel Juaristi	Unattached	Free
4 July 2015	(Spain) Néstor Salinas	(Spain) CD Mirandés	Free

== Pre-season and friendlies ==
Win Draw Loss

31 July 2015 Friendly	Real Avilés (Spain)	0–3	(Spain) Bilbao Athletic	Spain
19:30 CEST (UTC+2)

5 August 2015 Friendly	Barakaldo (Spain)	0–0 (2–3 p)	(Spain) Bilbao Athletic	Spain
19:00 CEST (UTC+2)

8 August 2015 Friendly	Bilbao Athletic (Spain)	0–1	(Spain) UD Logroñés	Spain
19:30 CEST (UTC+2)

11 August 2015 Friendly	Oviedo (Spain)	0–2	(Spain) Bilbao Athletic	Spain
20:00 CEST (UTC+2)

14 August 2015 Friendly	Portugalete (Spain)	0–0 (3–2 p)	(Spain) Bilbao Athletic	Spain
18:00 CEST (UTC+2)

== Competitions ==
=== Overall record ===
Competition	First match	Last match	Starting round	Final position	Record							
Competition	First match	Last match	Starting round	Final position	Pld	W	D	L	GF	GA	GD	Win %
Segunda División	24 August 2015	4 June 2016	Matchday 1	22nd	42	8	8	26	35	59	−24	19.05
Total					42	8	8	26	35	59	−24	19.05

Last updated: 4 June 2016
Source: Soccerway

=== Segunda División ===
==== League table ====
Pos	Team	Pld	W	D	L	GF	GA	GD	Pts	Promotion, qualification or relegation
18	Almería	42	10	18	14	44	51	−7	48	
19	Ponferradina (R)	42	12	11	19	39	54	−15	47	Relegation to Segunda División B
20	Llagostera (R)	42	12	8	22	44	54	−10	44	Relegation to Segunda División B
21	Albacete (R)	42	10	9	23	39	61	−22	39	Relegation to Segunda División B
22	Bilbao Athletic (R)	42	8	8	26	35	59	−24	32	Relegation to Segunda División B

Source: LFP
Rules for classification: 1) points; 2) head-to-head points; 3) head-to-head goal difference; 4) goal difference; 5) number of goals scored
(R) Relegated

==== Results summary ====
Overall								Home						Away					
Pld	W	D	L	GF	GA	GD	Pts	W	D	L	GF	GA	GD	W	D	L	GF	GA	GD
42	8	8	26	35	59	−24	32	6	6	9	20	22	−2	2	2	17	15	37	−22

Last updated: 4 June 2016.
Source: La Liga Adelante

==== Results by round ====
Round	1	2	3	4	5	6	7	8	9	10	11	12	13	14	15	16	17	18	19	20	21	22	23	24	25	26	27	28	29	30	31	32	33	34	35	36	37	38	39	40	41	42
Ground	H	A	H	A	H	A	A	H	A	H	A	H	A	H	A	H	A	H	A	H	A	A	H	A	H	A	H	H	A	H	A	H	A	H	A	H	A	H	A	H	A	H
Result	L	L	W	L	W	L	L	D	L	D	D	W	L	D	L	L	D	D	L	L	L	L	L	W	L	L	W	L	L	L	W	W	L	D	L	L	L	D	L	L	L	W
Position	17	20	13	20	14	17	21	22	22	21	21	20	21	20	21	22	21	21	22	22	22	22	22	21	22	22	21	22	22	22	22	22	22	22	22	22	22	22	22	22	22	22

Updated to match(es) played on 4 June 2016. Source: La Liga Adelante
A = Away; H = Home; W = Win; D = Draw; L = Loss

==== Matches ====
The league fixtures were announced on 14 July 2015.

24 August 2015 1	Bilbao Athletic	0–1	Girona	Bilbao
--:-- CEST (UTC+2)				Stadium: San Mamés

30 August 2015 2	Elche	2–1	Bilbao Athletic	Elche
--:-- CEST (UTC+2)

6 September 2015 3	Bilbao Athletic	3–1	Mallorca	Bilbao
--:-- CEST (UTC+2)				Stadium: San Mamés

12 September 2015 4	Valladolid	1–0	Bilbao Athletic	Valladolid
--:-- CEST (UTC+2)

19 September 2015 5	Bilbao Athletic	1–0	Alcorcón	Bilbao
--:-- CEST (UTC+2)				Stadium: San Mamés

26 September 2015 6	Ponferradina	1–0	Bilbao Athletic	Ponferrada
--:-- CEST (UTC+2)

3 October 2015 7	Córdoba	1–0	Bilbao Athletic	Córdoba
--:-- CEST (UTC+2)

10 October 2015 8	Bilbao Athletic	0–0	Numancia	Bilbao
--:-- CEST (UTC+2)				Stadium: San Mamés

17 October 2015 9	Gimnàstic	2–1	Bilbao Athletic	Tarragona
--:-- CEST (UTC+2)

24 October 2015 10	Bilbao Athletic	0–0	Huesca	Bilbao
--:-- CEST (UTC+2)				Stadium: San Mamés

1 November 2015 11	Oviedo	0–0	Bilbao Athletic	Oviedo
--:-- CET (UTC+1)

9 November 2015 12	Bilbao Athletic	2–0	Llagostera	Bilbao
--:-- CET (UTC+1)				Stadium: San Mamés

14 November 2015 13	Mirandés	3–0	Bilbao Athletic	Miranda de Ebro
--:-- CET (UTC+1)

21 November 2015 14	Bilbao Athletic	0–0	Almería	Bilbao
--:-- CET (UTC+1)				Stadium: San Mamés

28 November 2015 15	Leganés	1–0	Bilbao Athletic	Leganés
--:-- CET (UTC+1)

7 December 2015 16	Bilbao Athletic	0–1	Zaragoza	Bilbao
--:-- CET (UTC+1)				Stadium: San Mamés

13 December 2015 17	Osasuna	1–1	Bilbao Athletic	Pamplona
--:-- CET (UTC+1)

21 December 2015 18	Bilbao Athletic	1–1	Lugo	Bilbao
--:-- CET (UTC+1)				Stadium: San Mamés

2 January 2016 19	Alavés	3–0	Bilbao Athletic	Vitoria-Gasteiz
--:-- CET (UTC+1)

10 January 2016 20	Bilbao Athletic	0–1	Albacete	Bilbao
--:-- CET (UTC+1)				Stadium: San Mamés

16 January 2016 21	Tenerife	2–0	Bilbao Athletic	Santa Cruz de Tenerife
--:-- CET (UTC+1)

23 January 2016 22	Girona	2–1	Bilbao Athletic	Girona
--:-- CET (UTC+1)

31 January 2016 23	Bilbao Athletic	0–1	Elche	Bilbao
--:-- CET (UTC+1)				Stadium: San Mamés

7 February 2016 24	Mallorca	2–3	Bilbao Athletic	Palma
--:-- CET (UTC+1)				Stadium: Iberostar Stadium; Referee: Adrián Cordero Vega

13 February 2016 25	Bilbao Athletic	0–1	Valladolid	Bilbao
--:-- CET (UTC+1)				Stadium: San Mamés

20 February 2016 26	Alcorcón	1–0	Bilbao Athletic	Alcorcón
--:-- CET (UTC+1)

27 February 2016 27	Bilbao Athletic	4–2	Ponferradina	Bilbao
--:-- CET (UTC+1)				Stadium: San Mamés

5 March 2016 28	Bilbao Athletic	1–2	Córdoba	Bilbao
--:-- CET (UTC+1)				Stadium: San Mamés

12 March 2016 29	Numancia	3–2	Bilbao Athletic	Soria
--:-- CET (UTC+1)

20 March 2016 30	Bilbao Athletic	0–4	Gimnàstic	Bilbao
--:-- CET (UTC+1)				Stadium: San Mamés

26 March 2016 31	Huesca	1–2	Bilbao Athletic	Huesca
--:-- CET (UTC+1)

4 April 2016 32	Bilbao Athletic	2–1	Oviedo	Bilbao
--:-- CEST (UTC+2)				Stadium: San Mamés

9 April 2016 33	Llagostera	2–1	Bilbao Athletic	Llagostera
--:-- CEST (UTC+2)

16 April 2016 34	Bilbao Athletic	1–1	Mirandés	Bilbao
--:-- CEST (UTC+2)				Stadium: San Mamés

24 April 2016 35	Almería	3–2	Bilbao Athletic	Almería
--:-- CEST (UTC+2)

2 May 2016 36	Bilbao Athletic	1–2	Leganés	Bilbao
--:-- CEST (UTC+2)				Stadium: San Mamés

8 May 2016 37	Zaragoza	2–0	Bilbao Athletic	Zaragoza
--:-- CEST (UTC+2)				Stadium: La Rosaleda; Referee: José Ramón Piñeiro Crespo

15 May 2016 38	Bilbao Athletic	0–0	Osasuna	Bilbao
--:-- CEST (UTC+2)				Stadium: San Mamés

22 May 2016 39	Lugo	2–0	Bilbao Athletic	Lugo
--:-- CEST (UTC+2)

26 May 2016 40	Bilbao Athletic	2–3	Alavés	Bilbao
--:-- CEST (UTC+2)				Stadium: San Mamés

29 May 2016 41	Albacete	2–1	Bilbao Athletic	Albacete
--:-- CEST (UTC+2)				Stadium: Carlos Belmonte

4 June 2016 42	Bilbao Athletic	2–0	Tenerife	Bilbao
--:-- CEST (UTC+2)				Stadium: San Mamés
