= Ezmel de Ablitas =

Ezmel de Ablitas (died 1342), "the rich Jew of Ablitas", had business relations with the King of Navarre and Aragon. He was the son of Don Juceph; and was born in the village of Ablitas, near Tudela, from which place he derived his name.

The King of Aragon and the nobles of Navarre borrowed large sums from him, which they failed to repay. On this account Ablitas was unable to fulfil his obligations to the state. After his death his grandson, Don Ezmel de Ablitas II, and a Christian citizen of Tudela were made administrators of his estate and obliged under oath to deliver his property, consisting of furniture, money, gold and silver vessels, vases, and carvings. His whole fortune, both personal and real, were confiscated in 1343 by the Queen of Navarre. The massive amount which came into the treasury by this confiscation can be suggested from the record of documents published by Jacobs — which cites a single indebtedness from the king of £53,000 (see Jew. Quart. Rev. viii. 487).

Two of his sons are mentioned, Funes and Judah. The latter name is found in a document at Pamplona (Jacobs, Sources of History of Jews in Spain, xxxviii, 85). Don Solomon de Ablitas, under Carlos II of Navarre, was administrador de los bienes de su consejero (administrator of the property of his counselor), 1362–67.

An Esezkiel de Ablitas (1422) is mentioned in Jacobs' "Sources."
