= Kike Sola =

Spanish footballer (born 1986)

Personal information
- Full name: Enrique Sola Clemente
- Date of birth: 25 February 1986 (age 40)
- Place of birth: Cascante, Spain
- Height: 1.85 m (6 ft 1 in)
- Position: Striker

Youth career
- Aluvión
- 1998–2003: Athletic Bilbao
- 2003–2004: Aluvión
- 2004–2005: Osasuna

Senior career*
Years	Team	Apps	(Gls)
2005–2007	Osasuna B	61	(17)
2007–2013	Osasuna	91	(22)
2009–2010	→ Numancia (loan)	7	(1)
2010	→ Levadiakos (loan)	10	(1)
2013–2018	Athletic Bilbao	15	(1)
2016	→ Middlesbrough (loan)	2	(0)
2016–2017	→ Getafe (loan)	6	(0)
2017	→ Numancia (loan)	10	(0)
Total		202	(42)

International career
2008	Spain U21	1	(0)
2011–2012	Basque Country	2	(0)
- * Club domestic league appearances and goals

Enrique "Kike" Sola Clemente (Spanish pronunciation: [enˈrike ˈkike ˈsola kleˈmente]; born 25 February 1986) is a Spanish former professional footballer who played as a striker.

In a 12-year senior career, he amassed La Liga totals of 106 matches and 22 goals over nine seasons, representing Osasuna and Athletic Bilbao in the competition.

== Club career ==
=== Osasuna ===
Sola was born in Cascante, Navarre. A product of CA Osasuna's youth system, he made his first-team and La Liga debut on 9 June 2007, coming on as a second-half substitute in a 5–0 away win against Real Betis and scoring twice.

On 16 July 2009, having appeared rarely in the previous two seasons (also struggling with injuries and loss of form), Sola moved to Segunda División's CD Numancia on a season-long loan, as part of a deal that saw Carlos Aranda move in the opposite direction, permanently. On 18 January of the following year, after a negative experience – even when healthy, he did not make the list of 18 on several occasions – he terminated his contract with the Soria club and moved abroad, joining Levadiakos F.C. from Greece until June.

For the 2010–11 campaign, Sola was initially only fourth-choice behind Aranda, Walter Pandiani and newly signed Dejan Lekić, only starting to receive significant playing time when the first two teammates were sidelined with injuries. On 13 March 2011, in one of his first starts, he netted in a 3–1 home victory over Racing de Santander, and added another the following matchday, scoring from a backheel in a 4–0 defeat of Hércules CF.

Osasuna eventually escaped relegation, and Sola finished as the team's top scorer even though he featured in less than half of the matches. On 11 May 2011, he helped with a brace to a 3–2 home win over Sevilla FC after his side trailed 2–0 at half-time.

Sola only played seven scoreless games in 2011–12, being troubled by tendinitis problems for several months and eventually undergoing surgery in early March 2012, being sidelined until June. On 25 February 2013, the day of his 27th birthday, he played just 20 minutes off the bench away against Levante UD, but netted the second goal in an eventual 2–0 victory for his seventh of the season.

On 31 March 2013, Sola helped with a brace as Osasuna came from behind to win 3–1 over Real Valladolid at the Estadio José Zorrilla.

=== Athletic Bilbao ===
In summer 2013, Sola joined Athletic Bilbao on a five-year contract with a €30 million buyout clause – he had already played youth football with the club, from ages 12 to 17. After spending four months recovering from injury he scored his first goal on 26 January 2014, closing the 5–1 away defeat of former side Osasuna.

Sola played sparingly for the Lions, remaining an unused substitute as they lost the 2015 final of the Copa del Rey to FC Barcelona. Against the same opponent, in that year's Supercopa de España, he came in the 80th minute of the second leg at the Camp Nou and, within seven minutes was given a red card for a foul on Javier Mascherano; his team nonetheless won 5–1 on aggregate for his first major honour.

In December 2015, Sola scored in each leg of Athletic's 8–0 aggregate win over Real Balompédica Linense in the domestic cup. The following 15 January he moved abroad for a second time, joining English Football League Championship leaders Middlesbrough on a temporary basis until the end of the campaign and teaming up with several compatriots at the club, among them manager Aitor Karanka. His first appearance occurred on 6 February, as he started and played the first half of the 1–1 home draw with Blackburn Rovers.

On 31 August 2016, Sola joined Getafe CF on a season-long loan. However, late into the following transfer window, that deal was cancelled and he moved to fellow second-division side Numancia in another temporary deal.

During his four-year spell at the San Mamés Stadium, Sola was rarely used. On 1 June 2018, citing a "lack of motivation", the 32-year-old retired from football.

== International career ==
Sola won his only cap for the Spain under-21 team on 25 March 2008, playing the second half of the 5–0 home win against Kazakhstan for the 2009 UEFA European Championship qualifiers after replacing Bojan Krkić.

== Honours ==
Athletic Bilbao

- Supercopa de España: 2015
