= Egoitz =

Male given name

- Gender: Male
- Language: Basque

Origin
- Meaning: home
- Region of origin: Basque Country

Other names
- Related names: Egoi; Ekaitz

Egoitz is a Basque masculine given name meaning "house" or "residence".

== People ==
- Egoitz Arana (born 2002), Spanish footballer
- Egoitz Bijueska (born 2010), Spanish skateboarder
- Egoitz García (born 1986), Spanish road cyclist
- Egoitz Jaio (born 1980), Spanish footballer
- Egoitz Magdaleno (born 1991), Spanish footballer
- Egoitz Muñoz (born 2004), Spanish footballer
