= Iturraspe =

Iturraspe is a surname. Notable people with the surname include:

- Ander Iturraspe (born 1989), Spanish footballer
- Carlos Iturraspe (1910–1981), Spanish footballer and manager
- Gorka Iturraspe (born 1994), Spanish footballer, brother of Ander
- Lourdes Pérez Iturraspe (born 2000), Argentinian field hockey player
