= Julen Arellano =

Spanish footballer

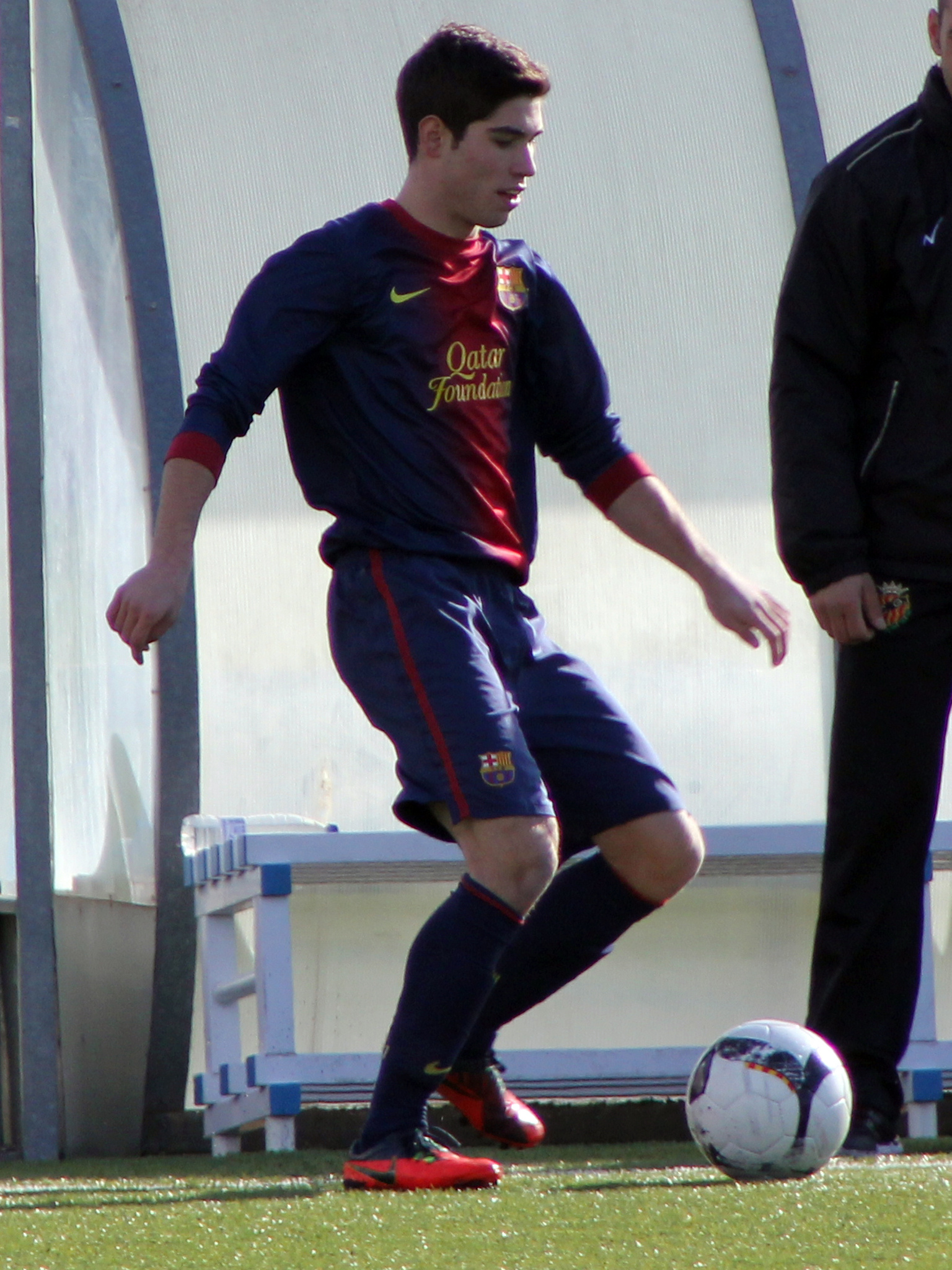

Personal information
- Full name: Julen Arellano Sandúa
- Date of birth: 8 January 1997 (age 29)
- Place of birth: Ablitas, Spain
- Height: 1.78 m (5 ft 10 in)
- Position: Left back

Youth career
- 2005–2010: Aluvión
- 2010–2011: Osasuna
- 2011–2015: Barcelona

Senior career*
Years	Team	Apps	(Gls)
2015–2016	Bilbao Athletic	1	(0)
2016–2018	Osasuna B	24	(0)
2018–2019	Tudelano	23	(0)
2019	Calahorra	0	(0)

International career
2013	Spain U16	1	(0)
2014	Spain U17	1	(0)
2015	Spain U18	2	(0)
- * Club domestic league appearances and goals

Julen Arellano Sandúa (born 8 January 1997) is a Spanish footballer who plays as a left back.

== Club career ==
Born in Ablitas, Navarre, Arellano joined CA Osasuna's youth setup in 2010, aged 13, after starting it out at CD Aluvión. On 15 April 2011 he joined FC Barcelona, being initially assigned to the Cadete squad.

On 15 April 2015 Arellano agreed a contract with Bilbao Athletic, with the deal being effective on 30 June. He made his professional debut on 21 November, coming on as a second-half substitute for Aitor Seguín in a 0–0 home draw against UD Almería in the Segunda División.

On 26 August 2016, Arellano returned to former club Osasuna, being initially assigned to the reserves in the Segunda División B. On 6 July 2018, he moved to fellow league team CD Tudelano.

Arellano signed with CD Calahorra in the summer 2019. However, on 26 September 2019, it was announced that Arellano had left the club again for personal and family reasons.
