= Islam Feruz =

Scottish former professional footballer

Personal information
- Full name: Islam Salieh Feruz
- Date of birth: 10 September 1995 (age 31)
- Place of birth: Kismaayo, Somalia
- Height: 1.62 m (5 ft 4 in)
- Position: Striker

Youth career
- 2005–2011: Celtic
- 2011–2014: Chelsea

Senior career*
Years	Team	Apps	(Gls)
2014–2019	Chelsea	0	(0)
2014	→ OFI (loan)	1	(0)
2015	→ Blackpool (loan)	2	(0)
2015–2016	→ Hibernian (loan)	6	(0)
2016–2017	→ Royal Excel Mouscron (loan)	7	(0)
2017	→ Swindon Town (loan)	4	(0)
2023	Radnički Niš	0	(0)
2025	Dubai City	0	(0)

International career^{‡}
2009–2010	Scotland U16	3	(1)
2009–2012	Scotland U17	18	(7)
2012	Scotland U19	5	(3)
2012	Scotland U20	1	(0)
2012–2013	Scotland U21	4	(2)
- * Club domestic league appearances and goals as of 14 August 2023 ‡ National team caps and goals as of 20 November 2013 (UTC)

Islam Salieh Feruz (born 10 September 1995) is a professional footballer who played as a centre forward. Born in Somalia, he represented Scotland at youth level.

Feruz spent most of his youth career with Celtic, before moving to Chelsea in September 2011 after rejecting a professional contract with the Scottish club. He never made a competitive appearance for the Chelsea first team, having mostly represented the team at U21 levels. He had loan spells at OFI, Blackpool, Hibernian, Royal Excel Mouscron and Swindon Town, but these were all brief and unsuccessful. His contract with Chelsea expired in 2019.

Feruz is a naturalised citizen of the United Kingdom. He declared in 2009 that he would play for the Scotland national football team, and represented the country at several youth levels. In April 2020, it was reported that Feruz had given up football to set up a company selling baseball caps. In August 2023 Feruz signed a contract with Radnički Niš only to be released two months later without making a single appearance.

== Early life ==
Feruz was born in Somalia. He was raised by his mother Aisha and stepfather Albashir Ali. He has three sisters: Kauthar, Ethil and Rahma. Wales Online and The Scottish Sun indicate that there is some uncertainty about his childhood and background.

The family lived in Tanzania before emigrating directly to the UK.

The family initially moved to London when Feruz was aged five, before later re-locating to Glasgow. There, he attended Hillhead High School, one of the most racially diverse secondary schools in Scotland. He and his family originally lived in a high-rise flat in Castlemilk, but Feruz later moved them to an upscale area in Glasgow's Charing Cross.

== Club career ==
=== Celtic ===
At age 10, Celtic fan Feruz was discovered by Celtic youth coach John Simpson while playing a kickabout at Castlemilk Sports Centre, and joined Celtic's youth academy. Feruz was playing in Celtic's under-14 team at age 11. The team's manager John Sludden said that after only 20 minutes he could tell Feruz was a special player and compared his talent to that of Paul McStay, Charlie Nicholas and Aiden McGeady. When Feruz was aged 12, he and his family were threatened with deportation back to his country of birth. Celtic youth coach Tommy Burns successfully campaigned for them to be able stay in Scotland, and for the Feruzes to be granted British passports.

Feruz's first match for Celtic came in 2009 when, aged 14, he made an appearance in Tommy Burns' memorial match. At the start of the 2011–12 season, there was speculation that Feruz was going to leave the club for Chelsea. Celtic manager Neil Lennon said in August that he had not seen the player since the start of the season. He also expressed his disappointment that a player who Celtic had helped to stay in the country and moved into an expensive flat was possibly going to leave the club. However, he did not blame Feruz but his agents, who he felt were "badly advising" the player, for the situation.

=== Chelsea ===
Feruz moved to English Premier League club Chelsea in September 2011, after rejecting a professional contract at Celtic. Because of "a flaw in the legal system" Chelsea were able to sign him for only £300,000 compensation. His contract was reportedly worth £2,500 a week. He scored two goals in the 2012 FA Youth Cup first leg in April 2012 as Chelsea youths went on to win the trophy for the second time in three years.

Chelsea's official website described Feruz in early 2013 as "short but sharp with an electric turn of pace and able to get a shot in early."

Feruz scored two goals in Chelsea's 6–0 win over Molde FK on 8 November 2012 in the NextGen Series.

Feruz made his Chelsea first team debut against a Malaysia League XI on 21 July 2013, coming on as a substitute in the 32nd minute for Kevin De Bruyne, but after half time he was replaced by André Schürrle.

In January 2014, he signed a new long-term contract with Chelsea. Feruz was released by Chelsea on the final day of the January 2019 transfer window, after several brief unsuccessful spells out on loan at other clubs, and without ever making a competitive first team appearance for Chelsea.

==== Loan to OFI Crete ====
On 29 August 2014, Feruz agreed to join FC Krylia Sovetov, but ended the loan just 48 hours after agreeing to the move to the Russian side because of being homesick.

After cancelling his move to Russia, on 1 September 2014, Feruz signed a season-loan deal with Super League Greece club OFI, managed by Gennaro Gattuso. Twelve days later he made his only league appearance for the team, replacing Mayron George for the final 28 minutes of a 3–0 defeat to Olympiacos at the Karaiskakis Stadium. On 24 September he made his first career start in a 1–1 Greek Football Cup away draw at Zakynthos, being replaced by Andreas Lampropoulos after 62 minutes. His only other game was also in the Cup group stages, starting at the Theodoros Vardinogiannis Stadium in a 1–0 win over Skoda Xanthi on 30 October and making way for eventual goalscorer George at half time.

==== Loan to Blackpool ====
After training with Championship side Cardiff City earlier that month, on 16 January 2015, Feruz joined another team in that division, Blackpool, for the remainder of the season. He made his Blackpool debut in a 2–0 defeat away to Wolverhampton Wanderers the following day, replacing Steve Davies for the final eight minutes at the Molineux Stadium. A week later he made the only other appearance of his loan, again replacing Davies at the same point in a 7–2 defeat to Watford at Vicarage Road. Following a 4–0 defeat against Brentford, Feruz tweeted that "This team take more kick-offs than corners". He returned to Chelsea shortly afterwards, having only played a total of 16 minutes whilst on loan. Blackpool ended the season with relegation to League One.

==== Loan to Hibernian ====
On 1 September 2015, Feruz signed a season-loan deal with Scottish Championship club Hibernian. He made his debut seven days later, coming on as a 72nd-minute substitute for Liam Henderson during a 3–0 win at Easter Road against Alloa Athletic. Feruz failed to make an impact at Hibs and his loan was terminated on 14 January 2016 after the player had made just six substitute appearances in his time at the club.

In February 2016, Feruz went on trial with Kazakhstan Premier League side FC Aktobe. He lasted a day at the club's warm-weather training camp in Turkey before leaving again.

==== Loan to Excel Mouscron ====
On 31 August 2016, Feruz joined Wallonian Belgian side Excel Mouscron on a season-long loan. Ten days later, he made his debut in the first division of Belgium in a 5–1 home defeat against Zulte Waregem, replacing Simon Diedhiou in the 70th minute. On 7 January 2017, after a disappointing loan spell, Feruz returned to Chelsea.

==== Loan to Swindon Town ====
On 11 January 2017, Feruz joined Swindon Town on loan for the remainder of the 2016–17 campaign. Three days later, Feruz made his Swindon Town debut in their 2–1 victory over Bolton Wanderers, featuring for 60 minutes before being replaced by Jermaine Hylton. On 28 February 2017, Feruz was fined £3,000 after he was caught driving an £80,000 Porsche whilst disqualified. He only played four competitive games, and failed to score in any of them.

=== Retirement from football ===
In April 2020, it was reported that Feruz had given up football to set up a company selling baseball caps.

== International career ==
Although he was born abroad and has no Scottish heritage, Feruz is able to play for Scotland under the new school qualification rule, which allows players with five years of education in a country before the age of 18 to play for that country's national football team. In 2009, Feruz declared that he would play for the Scotland national team. He was the first footballer to switch to Scotland under this rule, a change in FIFA's guidelines which Scottish Football Association chief executive Gordon Smith had pursued to accommodate players in Feruz's position.

In September 2009, Feruz was called up to the Scotland under-17 team at only 14 years of age. He scored on his debut against Cyprus. In April 2012, he was called up to the Scotland under-21 team aged 16, for a match against Italy. The cap would make him the youngest player ever to feature for Scotland U21s.

After turning in a poor performance at an Under-20 tournament in the Netherlands in May 2012, Feruz attracted some controversy when he tweeted that he "would love to play in the African Nation Cup! Despite being eligible to play for 2 African countries other than Som :P MyDream!!! :D". According to The Scotsman, unverified reports suggest that Feruz could play for these two nations due to family connections. His Twitter account was closed on 29 May, following "encouragement for him to do so from Chelsea."

On 14 October 2012, Feruz scored a hat-trick for the Scotland Under-19 team in a 4–3 victory against Switzerland, with Scotland winning their qualification group. Speaking after that game, Scottish FA performance chief Mark Wotte stated his belief that Feruz could be a top striker for the full national team. Stepping up to the U21s again in November 2012, Feruz scored twice for Scotland in a 3–2 defeat away against the Portugal Under-21 side. His last appearance at any level for Scotland was in a friendly match against England U21s on 13 August 2013, where Scotland lost 6–0 and Feruz was substituted after 62 minutes.

On 22 May 2014, after Feruz turned down multiple call ups at youth level it was reported that Feruz had turned his back on representing Scotland, but SFA representatives refused to rule out him returning to the fold in future. In August 2015, Feruz denied having turned his back on Scotland, stating "I've never said I didn't want to be considered for Scotland", adding "Some of the things which have been said about me not wanting to play have been untrue. I want to play for Scotland and I'll be honoured if I'm selected. I'm proud to have played for the national team at different age groups."

== Career statistics ==
As of match played 30 April 2017.

Appearances and goals by club, season and competition
Club	Season	League			National Cup		League Cup		Other		Total	
Club	Season	Division	Apps	Goals	Apps	Goals	Apps	Goals	Apps	Goals	Apps	Goals
OFI (loan)	2014–15	Super League Greece	1	0	2	0	—		—		3	0
Blackpool (loan)	2014–15	Championship	2	0	0	0	0	0	—		2	0
Hibernian (loan)	2015–16	Scottish Championship	6	0	0	0	0	0	0	0	6	0
Excel Mouscron (loan)	2016–17	Belgian First Division A	7	0	1	0	—		—		8	0
Swindon Town (loan)	2016–17	League One	4	0	0	0	0	0	0	0	4	0
Career total			20	0	3	0	0	0	0	0	23	0

== Awards ==
In 2010, Feruz was awarded the Young Scot Sport Award. The prize annually recognises youngsters between the ages of 12 and 22 who have contributed positively to communities in Scotland.

== Honours ==
=== Club ===
Chelsea Reserves

- FA Youth Cup: 2011–12
- Barclays U21 Premier League: 2013–14
