= Agostinho Cá =

Portuguese footballer (born 1993)

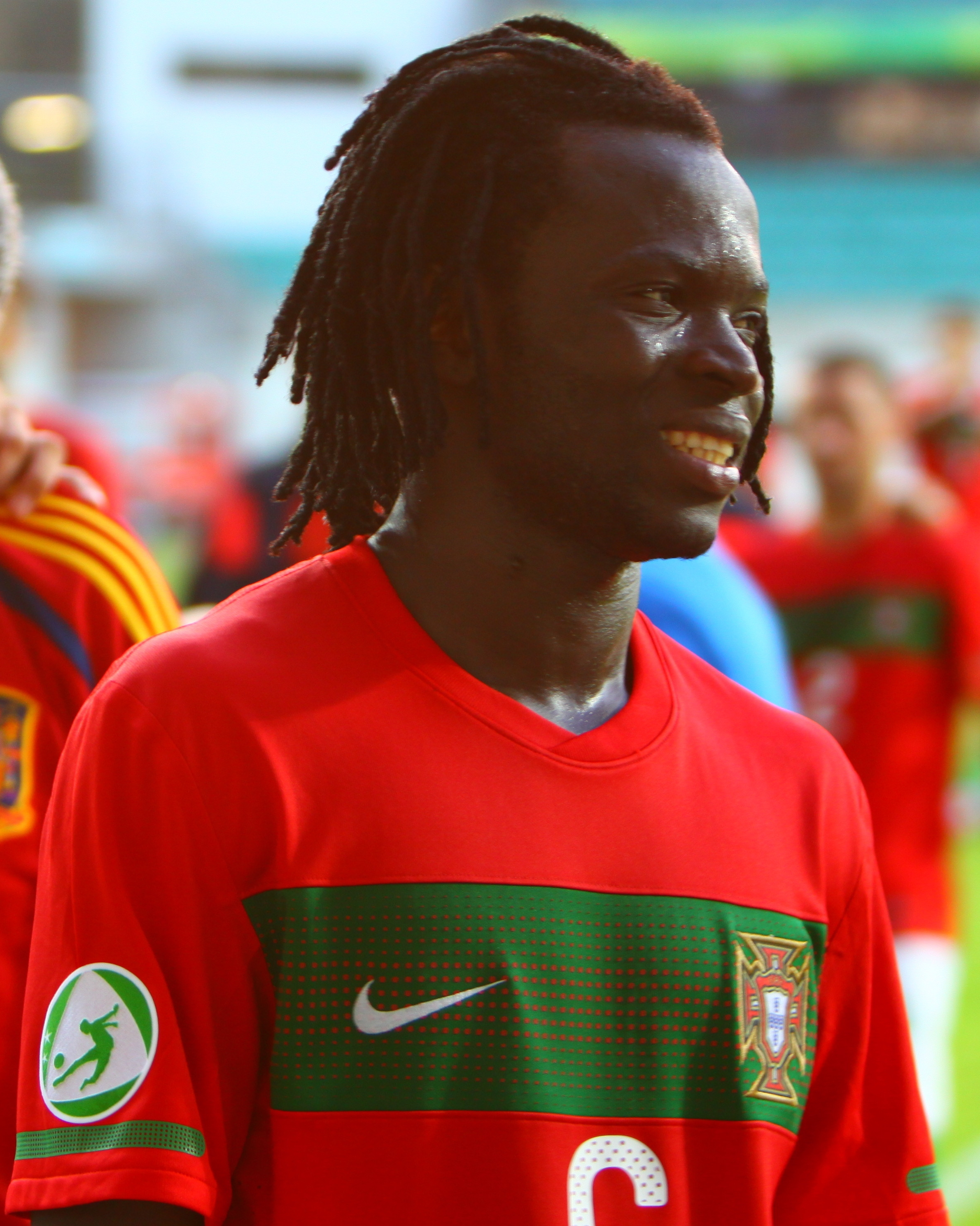
- Cá with Portugal U19 in 2012

Personal information
- Full name: Agostinho Odiquir Cá
- Date of birth: 24 July 1993 (age 33)
- Place of birth: Bissau, Guinea-Bissau
- Height: 1.70 m (5 ft 7 in)
- Position: Defensive midfielder

Youth career
- 2008–2009: Oeiras
- 2009–2012: Sporting CP

Senior career*
Years	Team	Apps	(Gls)
2012–2016	Barcelona B	4	(0)
2014	→ Girona (loan)	1	(0)
2015–2016	→ Lleida Esportiu (loan)	0	(0)
2017–2018	Stumbras	15	(0)
2017	Stumbras B	1	(0)
2018	Cova Piedade	2	(0)
2019–2020	Shabab Bourj	3	(0)
2020–2021	Fontinhas	12	(0)
2021–2022	Vitória Sernache	20	(0)
2022–2024	Canedo	41	(0)

International career
2010	Portugal U17	3	(0)
2010–2012	Portugal U19	22	(2)
2012–2013	Portugal U20	17	(1)
- * Club domestic league appearances and goals as of 13:37, 27 November 2024 (UTC)

Agostinho Odiquir Cá (born 24 July 1993) is a Portuguese professional footballer who plays as a defensive midfielder.

== Club career ==
Born in Bissau, Guinea-Bissau, Cá joined Sporting CP's youth system in 2009, aged 16. In the summer of 2012, after concluding his development, he moved to Barcelona in Spain alongside teammate and compatriot Edgar Ié.

In Catalonia, Cá started playing with the B team in the Segunda División. He made his official debut on 31 October 2012, featuring three minutes as a substitute for Javier Espinosa in a 4–1 away win against Huesca.

After taking no part for Barça the following season, Cá was loaned to fellow second-tier side Girona on 24 January 2014. He played only once for his new team, replacing Juanlu for the final 11 minutes of a 6–0 victory over Lugo at the Estadi Montilivi on 16 February.

On 19 August 2015, Cá joined the third Catalan club of his career, being loaned alongside Joel Huertas to Lleida Esportiu from Segunda División B. After appearing in no competitive games during the campaign, his loan was cancelled a month early.

Cá began a trial at Italian Lega Pro side Parma in September 2016, but a potential transfer was eventually scuppered by a knee injury. The following 1 April, he signed with Stumbras in Lithuania's A Lyga.

In August 2018, Cá returned to his country of adoption and joined LigaPro club Cova da Piedade. After only two appearances, he left on 18 November for personal reasons.

== International career ==
Cá represented Portugal at the 2012 UEFA European Under-19 Championship, playing three games in an eventual group stage exit.
