= 2015 Segunda División B play-offs =

Spanish football league play-offs

The 2015 Segunda División B play-offs (Playoffs de Ascenso or Promoción de Ascenso) are the final playoffs for promotion from 2014–15 Segunda División B to the 2015–16 Segunda División. The four first placed teams in each of the four Segunda División B groups join the Playoffs de Ascenso and the four last placed teams in Segunda División will be relegated to Segunda División B. It also decides the teams which placed 16th to be relegated to the 2015–16 Tercera División.

== Format ==
The four group winners have the opportunity to promote directly and become the overall Segunda División B champion. The four group winners will be drawn into a two-legged series where the two winners will be promoted to the Segunda División and will enter into the final for the Segunda División B champion. The two losing semifinalists will enter the playoff round for the last two promotion spots.

The four group runners-up will be drawn against one of the three fourth-placed teams outside their group while the four third-placed teams will be drawn against each other in a two-legged series. The six winners will advance with the two losing semifinalists to determine the four teams that will enter the last two-legged series for the last two promotion spots. In all the playoff series, the lower-ranked club will play at home first. Whenever there is a tie in position (e.g. like the group winners in the Semifinal Round and Final or the third-placed teams in the first round), a draw will determine the club to play at home first.

== Group Winners promotion play-off ==
=== Qualified teams ===
The draw was held in the RFEF headquarters, in Las Rozas (Madrid), on 18 May 2015, 17:00 CEST.

| Group | Team |
|---|---|
| 1 | Oviedo |
| 2 | Huesca |
| 3 | Gimnàstic |
| 4 | Cádiz |

=== Matches ===
==== Semifinals ====
| Team 1 | Agg. | Team 2 | 1st leg | 2nd leg |
|---|---|---|---|---|
| Huesca | 1–3 | Gimnàstic | 0–0 | 1–3 |
| Oviedo | 2–1 | Cádiz | 1–1 | 1–0 |

===== First leg =====
| 24 May 2015 | Oviedo | 1–1 | Cádiz | Oviedo |
| 17:00 (CEST) | Cervero 81' | Report | Jona 44' | Stadium: Carlos Tartiere; Attendance: 30,000; Referee: Vicente Moral |

| 24 May 2015 | Huesca | 0–0 | Gimnàstic | Huesca |
| 18:05 (CEST) | | Report | | Stadium: El Alcoraz; Attendance: 4,300; Referee: Carbonell Hernández |

===== Second leg =====
| 31 May 2015 | Gimnàstic | 3–1 | Huesca | Tarragona |
| 12:00 (CEST) | Júnior 48'; Rocha 59'; Marcos 81' | | Mainz 90+4' | Stadium: Nou Estadi; Attendance: 13,791 |

| 31 May 2015 | Cádiz | 0–1 | Oviedo | Cádiz |
| 18:00 (CEST) | | | Fernández 53' | Stadium: Ramón de Carranza |

Promoted to Segunda División
| Gimnàstic (3 years later) | Oviedo (12 years later) |

==== Final ====
| Team 1 | Agg. | Team 2 | 1st leg | 2nd leg |
|---|---|---|---|---|
| Gimnàstic | 2–4 | Oviedo | 2–1 | 0–3 |

===== First leg =====
| 7 June 2015 | Gimnàstic | 2–1 | Oviedo | Tarragona |
| 12:00 (CEST) | Lago Junior 17'; Marcos 65' (pen.) | Report | Sergio García 43' | Stadium: Nou Estadi; Attendance: 3,552; Referee: Usón Rosel |

===== Second leg =====
| 10 June 2015 | Oviedo | 3–0 | Gimnàstic | Oviedo |
| 20:30 (CEST) | Linares 10', 54'; Omgba (yellow card) 33'; Cervero 83' | Report | Xavier (yellow card) 43' | Stadium: Carlos Tartiere; Attendance: 12,578; Referee: Cid Camacho |

Segunda División B
2014–15 Winners
Real Oviedo

== Non-champions promotion play-off ==
=== First round ===
==== Qualified teams ====
The draw was held in the RFEF headquarters, in Las Rozas (Madrid).

| Group | Position | Team |
|---|---|---|
| 1 | 2nd | Murcia |
| 2 | 2nd | Bilbao Athletic |
| 3 | 2nd | Huracán Valencia |
| 4 | 2nd | UCAM Murcia |

| Group | Position | Team |
|---|---|---|
| 1 | 3rd | Racing Ferrol |
| 2 | 3rd | Guadalajara |
| 3 | 3rd | Reus Deportiu |
| 4 | 3rd | Almería B |

| Group | Position | Team |
|---|---|---|
| 1 | 4th | UD Logroñés |
| 2 | 4th | Real Unión |
| 3 | 4th | Hércules |
| 4 | 4th | Villanovense |

==== Matches ====
| Team 1 | Agg. | Team 2 | 1st leg | 2nd leg |
|---|---|---|---|---|
| UD Logroñés | 2–3 | Huracán Valencia | 1–1 | 1–2 (aet) |
| Hércules | 2–1 | Murcia | 1–1 | 1–0 |
| Real Unión | 0–1 | UCAM Murcia | 0–0 | 0–1 (aet) |
| Villanovense | 2–3 | Bilbao Athletic | 2–1 | 0–2 |
| Almería B | 3–3 (a) | Guadalajara | 2–2 | 1–1 |
| Racing Ferrol | 2–1 | Reus Deportiu | 1–0 | 1–1 |

===== First leg =====
| 23 May 2015 | Racing Ferrol | 1 – 0 | Reus Deportiu | Ferrol |
| 16:30 (CEST) | Nano 24' | Report | | Stadium: Estadio A Malata; Attendance: 6,000; Referee: Cordero Vega |

| 23 May 2015 | Villanovense | 2 – 1 | Bilbao Athletic | Villanueva de la Serena |
| 18:30 (CEST) | Javi Sánchez 48'; Espinar 77' | Report | Bengoa 67' | Stadium: Estadio Romero Cuerda; Attendance: 3,000; Referee: Santos Pargaña |

| 23 May 2015 | UD Logroñés | 1 – 1 | Huracán Valencia | Logroño |
| 21:00 (CEST) | Menudo 47' (pen.) | Report | Ariday 66' (pen.) | Stadium: Estadio Las Gaunas; Attendance: 6,758; Referee: Fernández Pérez |

| 23 May 2015 | Hércules | 1 – 1 | Murcia | Alicante |
| 21:00 (CEST) | Casares 41' | Report | Palazón 65' | Stadium: Estadio José Rico Pérez; Attendance: 12,000; Referee: Domínguez Cervantes |

| 24 May 2015 | Real Unión | 0 – 0 | UCAM Murcia | Irun |
| 18:00 (CEST) | | Report | | Stadium: Stadium Gal; Attendance: 3,500; Referee: Herrero Arenas |

| 24 May 2015 | Almería B | 2 – 2 | Guadalajara | Almería |
| 19:00 (CEST) | Iván Sánchez 8' (pen.); Puertas 31' | Report | Toledo 2'; Javi Pérez 68' | Stadium: Estadio de los Juegos Mediterráneos; Attendance: 762; Referee: Díaz Escudero |

===== Second leg =====
| 30 May 2015 | Huracán Valencia | 2 – 1 (a.e.t.) (3–2 agg.) | UD Logroñés | Torrent |
| 17:00 (CEST) | Rubio 73' (pen.); Navarro 90+2' | Report | Camochu 54' | Stadium: San Gregorio; Attendance: 3,500; Referee: Pulido Santana |

| 30 May 2015 | Murcia | 0 – 1 (1–2 agg.) | Hércules | Murcia |
| 19:00 (CEST) | | Report | Fran González 88' | Stadium: Nueva Condomina; Attendance: 13,147; Referee: Milla Alvendiz |

| 30 May 2015 | Guadalajara | 1 – 1 (3–3 agg.) | Almería B | Guadalajara |
| 19:00 (CEST) | Molinero 44' | Report | Hicham 58' | Stadium: Pedro Escartín; Attendance: 3,000; Referee: Hernández Maeso |

| 31 May 2015 | Reus Deportiu | 1 – 1 (1–2 agg.) | Racing Ferrol | Reus |
| 12:15 (CEST) | Carbià 82' | Report | Marcos Álvarez 70' | Stadium: Estadi Municipal; Attendance: 4,000; Referee: Leo Ollo |

| 31 May 2015 | UCAM Murcia | 1 – 0 (a.e.t.) (1–0 agg.) | Real Unión | Murcia |
| 17:30 (CEST) | Javi Gómez 105' | Report | | Stadium: La Condomina; Attendance: 3,000; Referee: Pérez Muley |

| 31 May 2015 | Bilbao Athletic | 2 – 0 (3–2 agg.) | Villanovense | Bilbao |
| 20:00 (CEST) | Iturraspe 85'; Santamaría 90+5' | Report | | Stadium: San Mamés; Attendance: 12,000; Referee: Varón Aceitón |

=== Second round ===
==== Qualified teams ====
The draw was held in the RFEF headquarters, in Las Rozas (Madrid).

| Group | Position | Team |
|---|---|---|
| 2 | 1st | Huesca |
| 4 | 1st | Cádiz |

| Group | Position | Team |
|---|---|---|
| 2 | 2nd | Bilbao Athletic |
| 3 | 2nd | Huracán Valencia |
| 4 | 2nd | UCAM Murcia |

| Group | Position | Team |
|---|---|---|
| 1 | 3rd | Racing Ferrol |
| 2 | 3rd | Guadalajara |

| Group | Position | Team |
|---|---|---|
| 3 | 4th | Hércules |

==== Matches ====
| Team 1 | Agg. | Team 2 | 1st leg | 2nd leg |
|---|---|---|---|---|
| Hércules | 2–2 (a) | Cádiz | 2–1 | 0–1 |
| Racing Ferrol | 0–6 | Huesca | 0–4 | 0–2 |
| Guadalajara | 0–2 | Huracán Valencia | 0–0 | 0–2 |
| Bilbao Athletic | 2–1 | UCAM Murcia | 1–0 | 1–1 |

===== First leg =====
| 6 June 2015 | Racing Ferrol | 0 – 4 | Huesca | Ferrol |
| 18:00 (CEST) | | Report | Josan 1'; Mainz 42'; Scardina 51'; Tyronne 54' | Stadium: A Malata; Attendance: 6,500; Referee: Alonso Prendes |

| 6 June 2015 | Guadalajara | 0 – 0 | Huracán Valencia | Guadalajara |
| 18:30 (CEST) | | Report | | Stadium: Pedro Escartín; Attendance: 3,000; Referee: Muñiz Ruiz |

| 6 June 2015 | Bilbao Athletic | 1 – 0 | UCAM Murcia | Bilbao |
| 18:30 (CEST) | Merino 51' | Report | | Stadium: San Mamés; Attendance: 21,500; Referee: Soto Grado |

| 7 June 2015 | Hércules | 2 – 1 | Cádiz | Alicante |
| 20:00 (CEST) | Chechu 49', 51' | Report | Airam 65' | Stadium: José Rico Pérez; Attendance: 10,000; Referee: Ávalos Martos |

===== Second leg =====
| 13 June 2015 | Huesca | 2 – 0 (6–0 agg.) | Racing Ferrol | Huesca |
| 18:00 (CEST) | Mainz 40'; Pallarés 54' | | | Stadium: El Alcoraz |

| 13 June 2015 | UCAM Murcia | 1 – 1 (1–2 agg.) | Bilbao Athletic | Murcia |
| 18:00 (CEST) | Remón 22' | | Iturraspe 84' | Stadium: La Condomina |

| 13 June 2015 | Huracán Valencia | 2 – 0 (2–0 agg.) | Guadalajara | Torrent |
| 19:30 (CEST) | Peris 10'; Luismi 90' | | | Stadium: San Gregorio |

| 14 June 2015 | Cádiz | 1 – 0 (2–2 agg.) | Hércules | Cádiz |
| 12:00 (CEST) | Jona 45+2' (pen.) | | | Stadium: Ramón de Carranza |

=== Third round ===
==== Qualified teams ====
The draw was held in the RFEF headquarters, in Las Rozas (Madrid).

| Group | Position | Team |
|---|---|---|
| 2 | 1st | Huesca |
| 4 | 1st | Cádiz |

| Group | Position | Team |
|---|---|---|
| 2 | 2nd | Bilbao Athletic |
| 3 | 2nd | Huracán Valencia |

==== Matches ====
| Team 1 | Agg. | Team 2 | 1st leg | 2nd leg |
|---|---|---|---|---|
| Bilbao Athletic | 3–1 | Cádiz | 2–0 | 1–1 |
| Huracán Valencia | 1–3 | Huesca | 1–1 | 0–2 |

===== First leg =====
| 21 June 2015 | Bilbao Athletic | 2 – 0 | Cádiz | Bilbao |
| 18:30 (CEST) | Santamaría 19', 24' | Report | | Stadium: San Mamés; Attendance: 32,100; Referee: Ais Reig |

| 21 June 2015 | Huracán Valencia | 1 – 1 | Huesca | Torrent |
| 19:30 (CEST) | Amarilla 66' | Report | Tyronne 55' | Stadium: San Gregorio; Attendance: 3,500; Referee: Ruipérez Marín |

===== Second leg =====
| 28 June 2015 | Cádiz | 1 – 1 (1–3 agg.) | Bilbao Athletic | Cádiz |
| 12:00 (CEST) | Jona 9' | Report | Salinas 90+3' | Stadium: Ramón de Carranza |

| 28 June 2015 | Huesca | 2 – 0 (3–1 agg.) | Huracán Valencia | Huesca |
| 19:00 (CEST) | Tyronne 54'; Mainz 57' | Report | | Stadium: El Alcoraz; Referee: López Toca |

Promoted to Segunda División
| Bilbao Athletic (19 years later) | Huesca (2 years later) |

== Relegation play-off ==
=== Qualified teams ===
The draw was held in the RFEF headquarters, in Las Rozas (Madrid).

| Group | Position | Team |
|---|---|---|
| 1 | 16th | Avilés |
| 2 | 16th | Las Palmas Atlético |
| 3 | 16th | Eldense |
| 4 | 16th | Cartagena |

=== Matches ===
| Team 1 | Agg. | Team 2 | 1st leg | 2nd leg |
|---|---|---|---|---|
| Avilés | 4–6 | Eldense | 1–4 | 3–2 |
| Cartagena | 1–1 (a) | Las Palmas Atlético | 0–0 | 1–1 |

==== First leg ====
| 23 May 2015 | Avilés | 1 – 4 | Eldense | Avilés |
| 19:30 (CEST) | Berna 34' | Report | Guardiola 5', 35'; Domenech 6'; José Sánchez 14' | Stadium: Román Suárez Puerta; Attendance: 3,000; Referee: González Esteban |

| 24 May 2015 | Cartagena | 0 – 0 | Las Palmas Atlético | Cartagena |
| 19:00 (CEST) | | Report | | Stadium: Cartagonova; Attendance: 14,000; Referee: Ávalos Barrera |

==== Second leg ====
| 31 May 2015 | Eldense | 2 – 3 (6–4 agg.) | Avilés | Elda |
| 12:00 (CEST) | Domenech 30'; Guardiola 50' (pen.) | Report | Borja García 76'; Gerardo 77'; Geni 88' | Stadium: Nuevo Pepico Amat; Attendance: 2,500; Referee: Barceló Roca |

| 31 May 2015 | Las Palmas Atlético | 1 – 1 (1–1 agg.) | Cartagena | Las Palmas |
| 12:00 (CEST) | Jesús Álvaro 63' | Report | Carlos Martínez 79' | Stadium: Anexo; Attendance: 1,500; Referee: Benjumea Álvarez |

Relegated to Tercera División
| Avilés | Las Palmas Atlético |

== See also ==
- 2014–15 Segunda División B
