= Jonás Ramalho =

Professional footballer

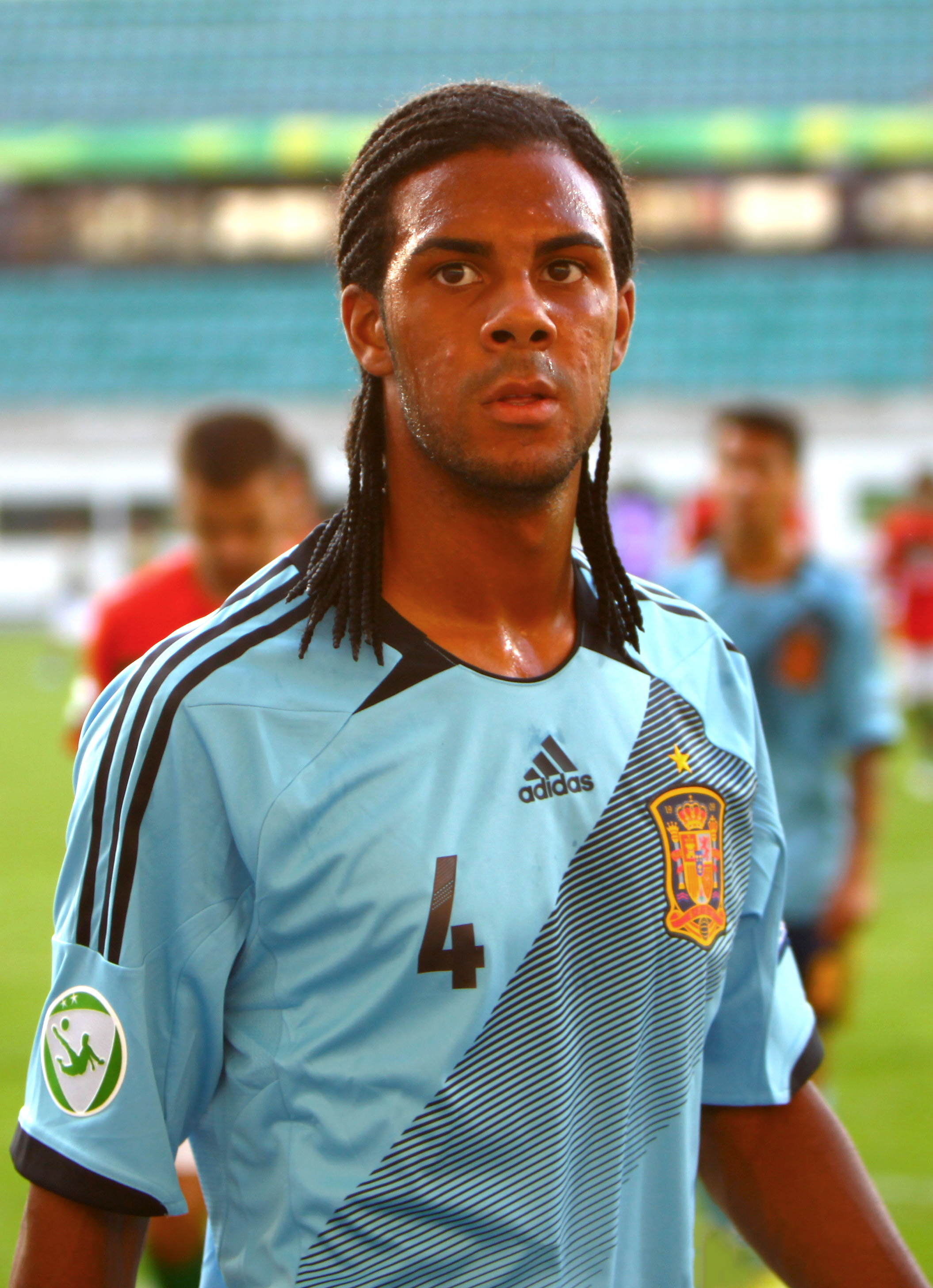
- Ramalho playing for Spain U19 in 2012

Personal information
- Full name: Jonás Ramalho Chimeno
- Date of birth: 10 June 1993 (age 33)
- Place of birth: Barakaldo, Spain
- Height: 1.81 m (5 ft 11 in)
- Position: Centre-back

Team information
- Current team: Olympic Charleroi
- Number: 12

Youth career
- 2001–2003: Leioa
- 2003–2010: Athletic Bilbao

Senior career*
Years	Team	Apps	(Gls)
2009–2016	Bilbao Athletic	68	(2)
2010	Basconia	8	(0)
2011–2013	Athletic Bilbao	8	(0)
2013–2015	→ Girona (loan)	61	(2)
2016–2019	Girona	79	(3)
2019–2021	Girona	28	(0)
2021	→ Osasuna (loan)	5	(0)
2021–2022	Osasuna	3	(0)
2022–2023	Málaga	27	(0)
2023	Ohod	4	(0)
2023–2024	Al-Ahli	?	(2)
2024–2025	Kazma		
2025–	Olympic Charleroi	22	(0)

International career
2009	Spain U16	3	(0)
2009–2010	Spain U17	13	(0)
2011	Spain U18	2	(0)
2011–2012	Spain U19	11	(0)
2020	Angola	1	(0)
Medal record
Men's football
Representing Spain
UEFA European Under-17 Championship
Runner-up	2010 Liechtenstein
- * Club domestic league appearances and goals as of 20 April 2026

Jonás Ramalho Chimeno (born 10 June 1993) is a professional footballer who plays as a central defender for Challenger Pro League club Olympic Charleroi.

In 2011, he was the first mixed-race player to appear for Athletic Bilbao – who only field Basque players – in an official competition. During his career, he represented mainly that club and Girona.

Born in Spain, Ramalho made his debut for Angola in 2020.

== Club career ==
=== Athletic Bilbao ===
Ramalho was born in Barakaldo, Biscay, to a Basque mother and an Angolan father. A product of Athletic Bilbao's famed youth system at Lezama, he first appeared with the main squad at only 14, featuring as a substitute in a friendly match against SD Amorebieta to become its youngest player of all time. As a senior, he had only played once for the reserves when he received his first call-up for the first team, being named in the 18-man list for a UEFA Europa League match at home to SV Werder Bremen, filling in for regular Andoni Iraola as the side was already qualified; however, he did not leave the bench in the 0–3 group stage home loss on 16 December 2009.

Ramalho made his La Liga debut on 20 November 2011 at the age of 18 years and five months, sent on by coach Marcelo Bielsa to play the last five minutes in place of Fernando Llorente a 2–1 away win against Sevilla FC. On 2 August of the following year he made his first appearance in European competition, starting in a 3–1 home victory over NK Slaven Belupo in that season's UEFA Europa League.

=== Girona ===
In 2013, Ramalho was loaned to Girona FC, playing regularly in two Segunda División seasons. In May 2015, shortly after suffering a serious knee injury away to Deportivo Alavés, he signed a new contract to keep him at Athletic for the upcoming campaign.

On 7 June 2016, after suffering relegation with the B side, Ramalho was released by Athletic Bilbao. He returned to Girona late in the month, now in a permanent deal.

Ramalho left the Catalan club after its relegation in 2019, but returned to on 20 August of that year after agreeing to a three-year contract.

=== Osasuna ===
Ramalho returned to the top division on 1 February 2021, loaned to CA Osasuna until 30 June with a buying option. He signed a permanent one-year contract with the club on 5 July.

=== Málaga ===
On 15 July 2022, Ramalho agreed to a two-year deal with second division side Málaga CF. In June 2023, having been relegated, he left after activating an exit clause on his contract.

=== Later career ===
On 19 July 2023, Ramalho joined Saudi First Division League club Ohod Club. Two months later, he switched to the Bahraini Premier League with Al-Ahli Club (Manama).

== International career ==
Ramalho was part of the Spanish under-19 squads which won the European Championship in 2011 and 2012. With the team already qualified for the knockout stages as group winners, he was fielded by coach Ginés Meléndez for the final group game in the former competition in Chiajna, scoring an own goal which opened a 3–0 victory for Turkey.

Ramalho was called up by Angola manager Srđan Vasiljević in a preliminary squad for the 2019 Africa Cup of Nations, but was one of three players cut before the final tournament in Egypt. He was again selected in September 2020, winning his first cap the following month in the 3–0 defeat of Mozambique held in Rio Maior.

== Career statistics ==
=== Club ===
As of match played 22 May 2021

Appearances and goals by club, season and competition
Club	Season	League			National Cup		Continental		Other		Total	
Club	Season	Division	Apps	Goals	Apps	Goals	Apps	Goals	Apps	Goals	Apps	Goals
Bilbao Athletic	2009–10	Segunda División B	5	0	—		—		—		5	0
Bilbao Athletic	2010–11	Segunda División B	6	0	—		—		—		6	0
Bilbao Athletic	2011–12	Segunda División B	31	2	—		—		—		31	2
Bilbao Athletic	2012–13	Segunda División B	7	0	—		—		4 (Note: Appearances in promotion playoffs)	0	11	0
Bilbao Athletic	2015–16	Segunda División	19	0	—		—		—		19	0
Bilbao Athletic	Total		68	2	0	0	0	0	4	0	72	0
Athletic Bilbao	2011–12	La Liga	2	0	0	0	0	0	—		2	0
Athletic Bilbao	2012–13	La Liga	6	0	1	0	4 (Note: Appearances in UEFA Europa League)	0	—		11	0
Athletic Bilbao	Total		8	0	1	0	4	0	0	0	13	0
Girona (loan)	2013–14	Segunda División	25	0	3	0	—		—		28	0
Girona (loan)	2014–15	Segunda División	36	2	2	0	—		—		38	2
Girona	2016–17	Segunda División	31	2	1	0	—		—		32	2
Girona	2017–18	La Liga	26	0	2	0	—		—		28	0
Girona	2018–19	La Liga	22	1	5	0	—		—		27	1
Girona	2019–20	Segunda División	17	1	3	0	—		3	0	23	1
Girona	2020–21	Segunda División	11	0	4	0	—		—		15	0
Girona	Total		168	6	20	0	0	0	3	0	191	6
Osasuna (loan)	2020–21	La Liga	5	0	0	0	—		—		5	0
Osasuna	2021–22	La Liga	0	0	0	0	—		—		0	0
Osasuna	Total		5	0	0	0	0	0	0	0	5	0
Career total			249	7	21	0	4	0	7	0	281	7

=== International ===
Appearances and goals by national team and year
National team	Year	Apps	Goals
Angola	2020	1	0
Total		1	0

== Honours ==
Spain U19

- UEFA European Under-19 Championship: 2011, 2012
