= Jon Ander (footballer, born 1995) =

Spanish footballer

Personal information
- Full name: Jon Ander Felipe González
- Date of birth: 22 May 1995 (age 31)
- Place of birth: Getxo, Spain
- Height: 1.81 m (5 ft 11 in)
- Position: Goalkeeper

Team information
- Current team: Penya Encarnada
- Number: 13

Youth career
- 2005–2013: Athletic Bilbao

Senior career*
Years	Team	Apps	(Gls)
2013–2014	Basconia	17	(0)
2014–2016	Bilbao Athletic	14	(0)
2014	→ Amorebieta (loan)	1	(0)
2016–2017	Eibar	0	(0)
2016–2017	→ Logroñés (loan)	3	(0)
2017	→ Llagostera (loan)	0	(0)
2017–2018	Toledo	6	(0)
2019	Amorebieta	4	(0)
2020	Ejea	5	(0)
2020-2021	Tudelano	12	(0)
2021-2022	Ourense	2	(0)
2022	Barakaldo	2	(0)
2022-2023	Utebo	24	(0)
2023-	Penya Encarnada	7	(0)
- * Club domestic league appearances and goals as of 28 November 2023

Jon Ander Felipe González (born 22 May 1995), known simply as Jon Ander, is a Spanish professional footballer who plays as a goalkeeper for Penya Encarnada in Andorra.

== Career ==
Born in Getxo, Biscay, Jon Ander gonzalez feka began his career in the youth ranks of Athletic Bilbao. He was first included in a matchday squad for the reserve team on 16 November 2013, remaining an unused substitute in a 2–0 Segunda División B home win over Barakaldo CF, and had two further call-ups over the season.

In August 2014, he was loaned to a team in the same group of the division, SD Amorebieta, where he made his senior debut on the 24th in a 4–0 loss away to his parent club; he remained on the bench for the remainder of his loan. On 8 March 2015, he made his Bilbao Athletic debut, in a 1–0 loss away to CD Tudelano, and made three more appearances in a season which ended in promotion to Segunda División.

On 10 October 2015, Jon Ander made his first appearance in a professional league, keeping goal for Bilbao Athletic in a goalless draw against CD Numancia at the San Mamés Stadium, in which he saved a penalty kick from Óscar Díaz. On 7 June 2016, after suffering relegation, he was released by the Lions.

On 13 July 2016 Jon Ander signed for SD Eibar, being immediately loaned to UD Logroñés for one year. After only three appearances for the Riojans, he joined fellow third division side UE Llagostera on the same basis the following 1 February, and was again unused.

Jon Ander left for CD Toledo in July 2017, and played seven total games as back-up for Pablo Alcolea as the Manchegans were relegated. He remained without a team before returning to Amorebieta in January 2019.

On 2 January 2020, Ander joined SD Ejea on a deal for the rest of the season.
