= Nick Weber =

German footballer

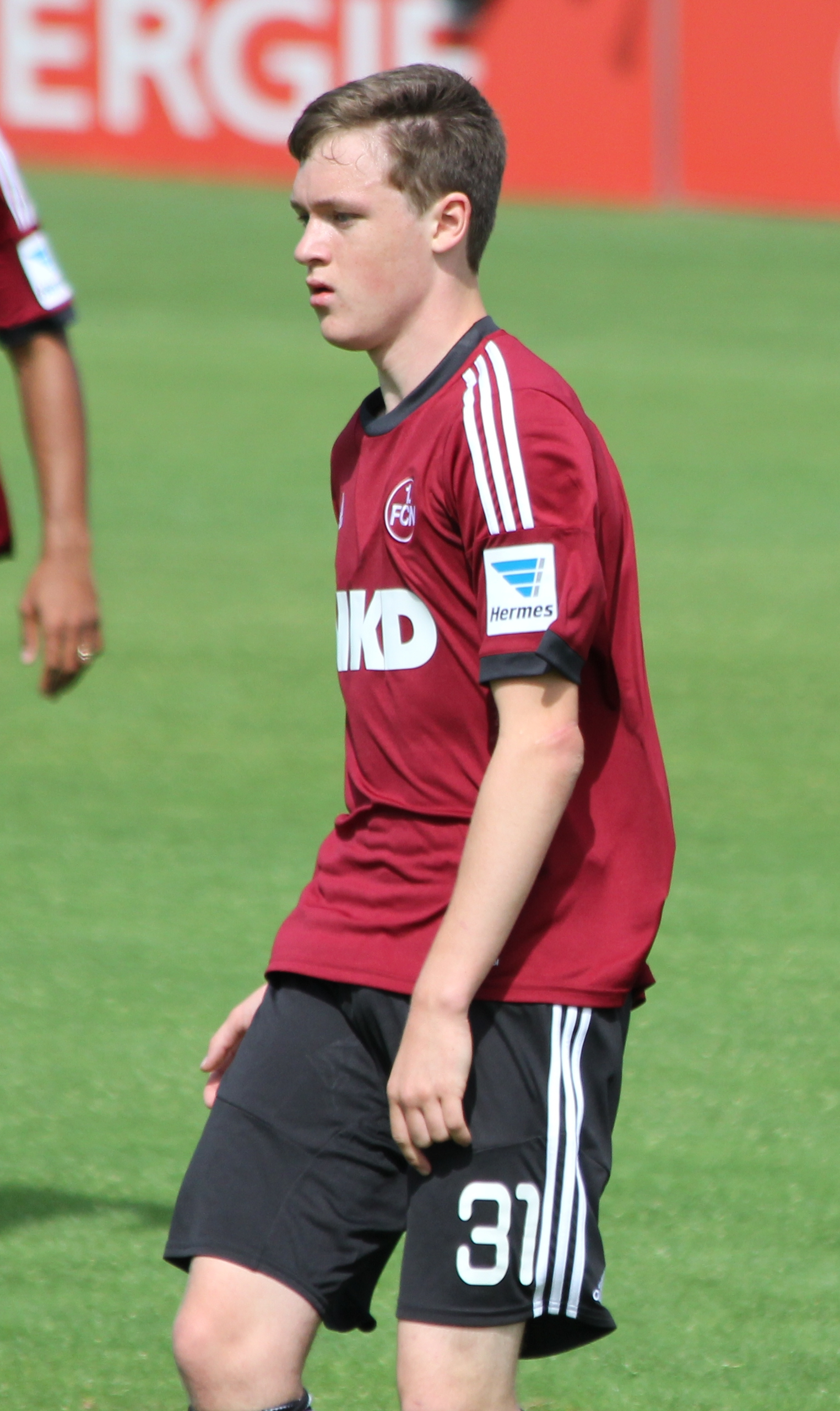

Personal information
- Full name: Nick Weber
- Date of birth: 4 May 1995 (age 31)
- Place of birth: Lippstadt, Germany
- Height: 1.80 m (5 ft 11 in)
- Position: Striker

Youth career
- 2000–2003: Germania Esbeck
- 2003–2006: SV Lippstadt 08
- 2006–2013: Borussia Dortmund
- 2013–2014: Borussia Dortmund

Senior career*
| Years | Team | Apps | (Gls) |
| 2013 | 1. FC Nürnberg II | 7 | (0) |
| 2013–2015 | Borussia Dortmund II | 9 | (0) |

International career
| 2013 | Germany U18 | 2 | (2) |
| 2013 | Germany U19 | 1 | (0) |
- * Club domestic league appearances and goals as of 6 September 2015

Nick Weber (born 4 May 1995) is a German footballer who last played for Borussia Dortmund II. He plays as a striker. He made his professional debut in the 3. Liga on 3 September 2013 against MSV Duisburg.

In July 2013 he joined 1. FC Nürnberg on a three-year deal but his contract was revoked on 16 August 2013 and he returned to Borussia Dortmund.
