= CD Aluvión =

Aluvión
- Full name: Club Deportivo Aluvión
- Founded: 1922
- Ground: Malón de Echaide, Cascante, Navarre, Spain
- Capacity: 3,000
- Chairman: Alberto Sesma
- Manager: Alfredo Lostado
- League: Regional Preferente – Group 2
- 2024–25: Regional Preferente – Group 2, 7th of 16
Home colours	Away colours

Club Deportivo Aluvión is a Spanish football team based in Cascante, in the autonomous community of Navarre. Founded in 1922 it plays in Regional Preferente – Group 2, holding home games at Campo de Fútbol Malón de Echaide, with a capacity of 3,000 seats.

== Season to season ==
Season	Tier	Division	Place	Copa del Rey
1967–68	5	2ª Reg.	7th	
1968–69	5	2ª Reg.	11th	
1969–70	5	2ª Reg.	12th	
1970–71	6	3ª Reg.	6th	
1971–72	6	3ª Reg.	4th	
1972–73	5	2ª Reg.	12th	
1973–74	5	2ª Reg.	8th	
1974–75	5	1ª Reg.	13th	
1975–76	5	1ª Reg.	13th	
1976–77	5	1ª Reg.	12th	
1977–78	6	1ª Reg.	3rd	
1978–79	6	1ª Reg.	2nd	
1979–80	5	Reg. Pref.	12th	
1980–81	5	Reg. Pref.	19th	
1981–82	6	1ª Reg.	14th	
1982–83	7	2ª Reg.	3rd	
1983–84	6	1ª Reg.	18th	
1984–85	6	1ª Reg.	14th	
1985–86	6	1ª Reg.	6th	
1986–87	5	Reg. Pref.	17th	

Season	Tier	Division	Place	Copa del Rey
1987–88	6	1ª Reg.	9th	
1988–89	6	1ª Reg.	13th	
1989–90	6	1ª Reg.	12th	
1990–91	6	1ª Reg.	9th	
1991–92	6	1ª Reg.	8th	
1992–93	6	1ª Reg.	9th	
1993–94	6	1ª Reg.	1st	
1994–95	5	Reg. Pref.	18th	
1995–96	5	Reg. Pref.	12th	
1996–97	5	Reg. Pref.	16th	
1997–98	5	Reg. Pref.	4th	
1998–99	5	Reg. Pref.	5th	
1999–2000	5	Reg. Pref.	1st	
2000–01	4	3ª	8th	
2001–02	4	3ª	9th	
2002–03	4	3ª	16th	
2003–04	4	3ª	10th	
2004–05	4	3ª	7th	
2005–06	4	3ª	8th	
2006–07	4	3ª	8th	

Season	Tier	Division	Place	Copa del Rey
2007–08	4	3ª	7th	
2008–09	4	3ª	15th	
2009–10	4	3ª	13th	
2010–11	4	3ª	15th	
2011–12	4	3ª	20th	
2012–13	5	Reg. Pref.	6th	
2013–14	5	Reg. Pref.	6th	
2014–15	5	Reg. Pref.	8th	
2015–16	5	1ª Aut.	14th	
2016–17	5	1ª Aut.	8th	
2017–18	5	1ª Aut.	13th	
2018–19	6	Reg. Pref.	11th	
2019–20	6	Reg. Pref.	3rd	
2020–21	5	1ª Aut.	10th	
2021–22	6	1ª Aut.	8th	
2022–23	7	Reg. Pref.	3rd	
2023–24	6	1ª Aut.	15th	
2024–25	7	Reg. Pref.	7th	
2025–26	7	Reg. Pref.		

- 12 seasons in Tercera División
