= Geraldo Antonio =

Angolan footballer (born 1994)

Personal information
- Full name: Geraldo Alberto Antonio
- Date of birth: 20 August 1994 (age 32)
- Place of birth: Quimbele, Angola
- Position: Forward

Youth career
- CVV Be Fair
- SBV Excelsior
- Feyenoord
- 2008–2009: Sparta Rotterdam
- 2011–2013: AZ Alkmaar
- 2011–2013: PSV Eindhoven

Senior career*
Years	Team	Apps	(Gls)
2013	PSV Eindhoven	0	(0)
2013	→ Jong PSV	9	(1)
2014	Sparta Rotterdam	3	(0)
2014–2015	Santa Clara	5	(1)
2015–2016	FC Lisse	6	(0)
2017	Zwarte Leeuw		
- * Club domestic league appearances and goals

Geraldo Alberto Antonio (born 20 August 1994) is an Angolan retired professional football player. After retiring, he became a rapper under the name Chamo.

== Career ==
He made his professional debut as Jong PSV player in the second division on 3 August 2013 against Sparta Rotterdam.

In 2017, 23-year-old António decided to retire to focus on his rap career under the name Chamo.
