= Egoitz Magdaleno =

Spanish footballer

Personal information
- Full name: Egoitz Magdaleno de la Iglesia
- Date of birth: 4 April 1991 (age 35)
- Place of birth: Bilbao, Spain
- Height: 1.77 m (5 ft 9 1/2 in)
- Position: Midfielder

Youth career
- 2000–2001: Danok Bat
- 2001–2007: Athletic Bilbao
- 2007–2010: Danok Bat

Senior career*
Years	Team	Apps	(Gls)
2010–2011	Zalla	31	(3)
2011–2012	Basconia	21	(5)
2012–2016	Bilbao Athletic	63	(1)
2016–2017	Sestao	21	(0)
2017–2019	Leioa	39	(1)
2019–2020	El Ejido	8	(0)
- * Club domestic league appearances and goals as of 16 February 2020

Egoitz Magdaleno de la Iglesia (born 4 April 1991) is a Spanish professional footballer. Mainly a defensive midfielder, he can also play as a left back.

== Club career ==
Born in Bilbao, Biscay, Basque Country, Magdaleno was a Danok Bat CF youth graduate. He made his senior debuts with Zalla UC in 2010, in Tercera División.

In June 2011 Magdaleno moved to Athletic Bilbao, club he already represented as a youth, and was assigned to the farm team also in the fourth tier. On 30 May of the following year he was promoted to the reserves in Segunda División B.

On 3 May 2015, during a 0–1 loss at CF Fuenlabrada, Magdaleno suffered a serious knee injury which ruled him out of the promotion play-offs to Segunda División. He only returned to action in February 2016, appearing in a 1–2 Premier League International Cup loss against Villarreal CF.

Magdaleno made his professional debut on 4 June 2016, coming on as a late substitute for Unai Bilbao in a 2–0 home win against CD Tenerife for the second level championship; his side, however, was already relegated. Three days later, he was released by the Lions.

On 18 July 2016, Magdaleno signed for Sestao River in the third level.
