= Magnus Blakstad =

Norwegian footballer (born 1994)

Personal information
- Full name: Magnus Blakstad
- Date of birth: 18 January 1994 (age 32)
- Place of birth: Trondheim, Norway
- Height: 1.94 m (6 ft 4 1/2 in)
- Position: Midfielder

Youth career
- Rosenborg

Senior career*
Years	Team	Apps	(Gls)
2012	Rosenborg	0	(0)
2013–2020	Ranheim	129	(11)
- * Club domestic league appearances and goals as of 14 December 2020

Magnus Blakstad (born 18 January 1994) is a former Norwegian footballer who plays as a midfielder.

He signed a contract with Ranheim in 2013 and made his debut on 14 April 2013 against Ullensaker/Kisa, a game they won 3–1.

== Career statistics ==
=== Club ===
As of match played 13 December 2020

Appearances and goals by club, season and competition
Club	Season	League			National Cup		Europe		Total	
Club	Season	Division	Apps	Goals	Apps	Goals	Apps	Goals	Apps	Goals
Rosenborg	2012	Eliteserien	0	0	1	0	-		1	0
Rosenborg	Total		0	0	1	0	-	-	1	0
Ranheim	2013	1. divisjon	17	4	3	0	-		20	4
Ranheim	2014	1. divisjon	9	1	2	1	-		11	2
Ranheim	2015	1. divisjon	14	3	0	0	-		14	3
Ranheim	2016	1. divisjon	22	1	1	0	-		23	1
Ranheim	2017	1. divisjon	22	1	3	0	-		25	1
Ranheim	2018	Eliteserien	0	0	0	0	-		0	0
Ranheim	2019	Eliteserien	26	0	3	2	-		29	2
Ranheim	2020	OBOS-ligaen	19	1	0	0	-		19	1
Ranheim	Total		129	11	12	3	-	-	141	14
Career total			129	11	13	3	-	-	142	14
