= Alain Ebwelle =

Cameroonian footballer

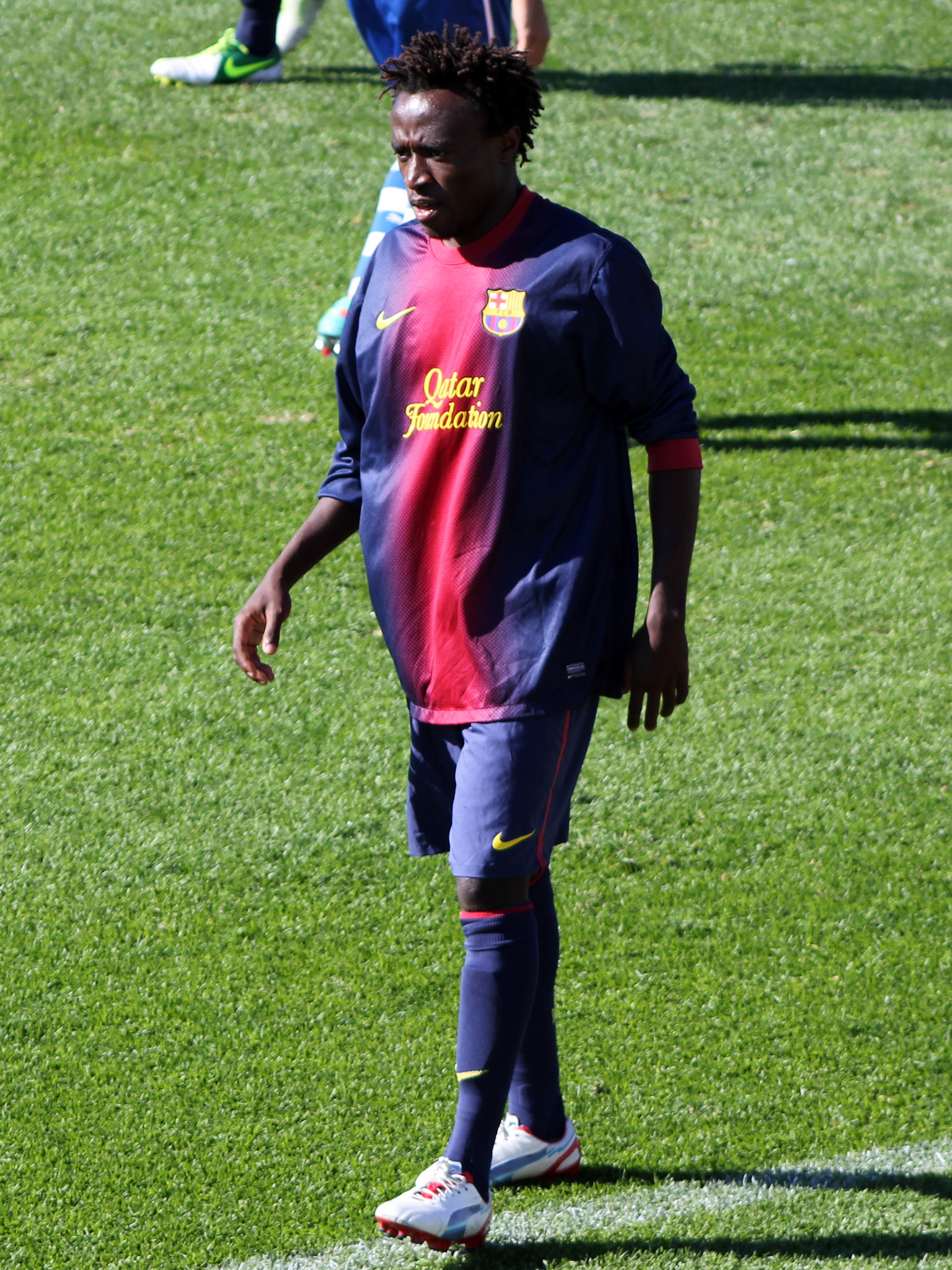
- Ebwelle in 2012

Personal information
- Full name: Alain Richard Ebwelle
- Date of birth: 28 September 1995 (age 31)
- Place of birth: Ebolowa, Cameroon
- Height: 1.68 m (5 ft 6 in)
- Position: Winger

Team information
- Current team: Castelnuovo Vomano

Youth career
- Samuel Eto'o Academy
- 2011–2014: Barcelona

Senior career*
Years	Team	Apps	(Gls)
2014–2015	Valencia B	7	(0)
2016	Castellón	15	(4)
2016–2017	Senica	17	(0)
2017	Marbella	7	(0)
2017–2018	Córdoba B	13	(3)
2018	Écija	3	(0)
2018–2019	Vélez	19	(2)
2019–2020	VPS	21	(5)
2020	IFK Mariehamn	5	(0)
2020–2021	Radomiak Radom	9	(0)
2021–2022	KTP	19	(0)
2022–2023	Episkopi	16	(1)
2023–	Castelnuovo Vomano		
- * Club domestic league appearances and goals as of 28 September 2024

Alain Richard Ebwelle (born 28 September 1995) is a Cameroonian professional footballer who plays as a left winger for Italian club Castelnuovo Vomano.

== Career ==
Born in Ebolowa, Ebwelle joined Barcelona's youth setup in 2011, from Samuel Eto'o Academy. On 4 June 2014, he agreed to a move to Valencia, being initially assigned to the reserves in Segunda División B.

Ebwelle appeared rarely during the campaign, and was subsequently released. On 1 February 2016, after six months without a club, he signed for Castellón in Tercera División.

In 2016, Ebwelle moved to Fortuna Liga side Senica, along with a host of Spanish-based players. He made his professional debut on 30 July, against Zemplín Michalovce.

On 3 January 2017, Ebwelle agreed to a contract with Marbella, back to Spain and its third division. On 25 August, he moved to fellow league team Córdoba CF B.

On 17 August 2020, he joined Polish club Radomiak Radom.

== Honours ==
Barcelona

- UEFA Youth League: 2013–14

Radomiak Radom

- I liga: 2020–21
