= Joel Huertas =

Spanish footballer (born 1995)

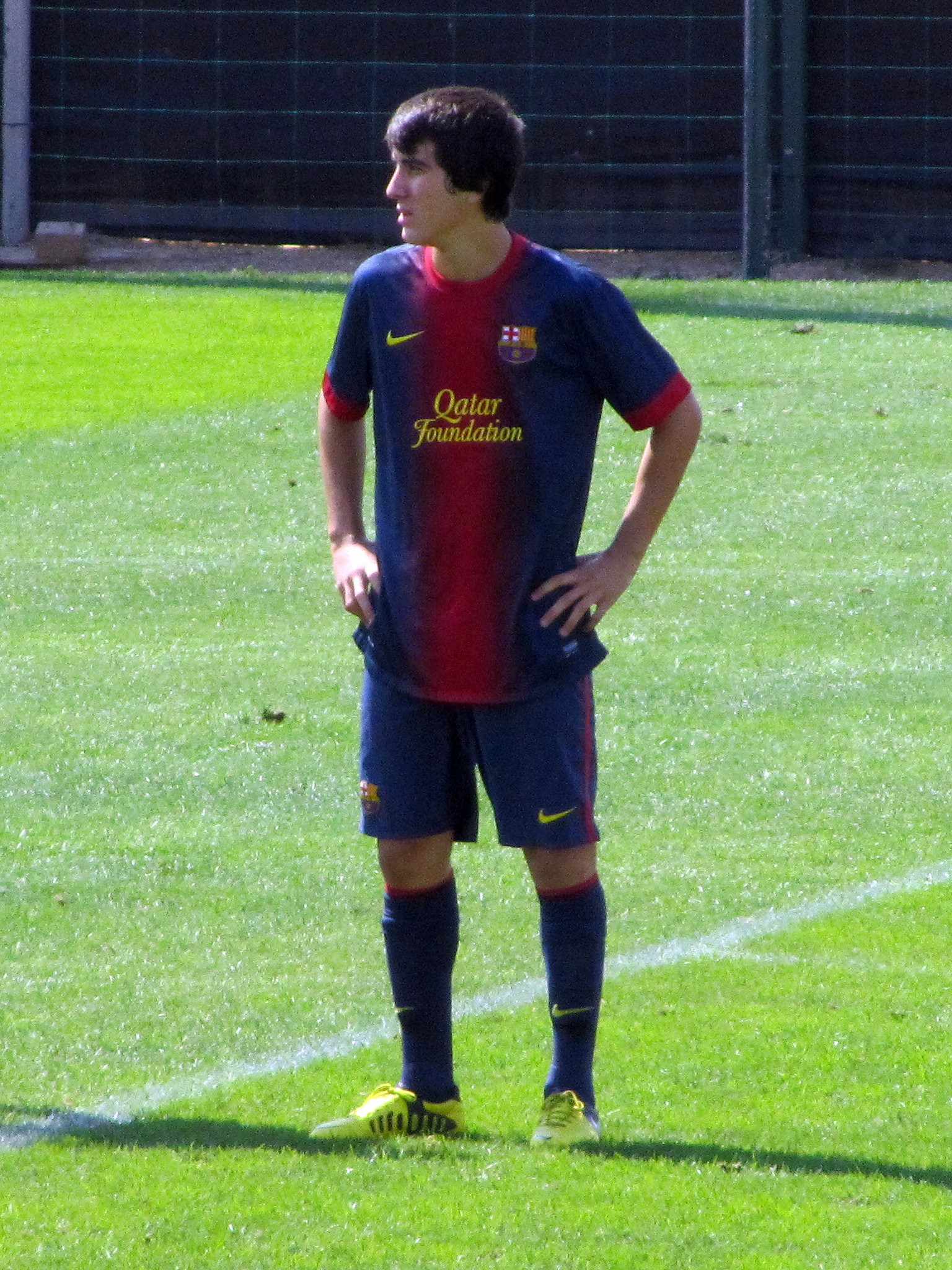
- Huertas in 2012

Personal information
- Full name: Joel Huertas Cornudella
- Date of birth: 9 May 1995 (age 31)
- Place of birth: Juneda, Spain
- Height: 1.74 m (5 ft 8 1/2 in)
- Position: Midfielder

Youth career
- Juneda
- Baix Segrià
- AEM
- 2007–2010: Mollerussa
- 2010–2011: Lleida Esportiu
- 2011–2014: Barcelona

Senior career*
Years	Team	Apps	(Gls)
2014–2016	Barcelona B	0	(0)
2014–2015	→ Badalona (loan)	9	(1)
2015–2016	→ Lleida Esportiu B (loan)	28	(2)
2016–2018	Lleida Esportiu B	31	(7)
2016–2018	Lleida Esportiu	15	(1)
2018–2019	Quintanar Rey	13	(1)
2019–2020	Wigry Suwałki	40	(8)
2020–2021	Igualada	25	(2)
2021–2023	Atlètic Lleida	53	(6)
2023–2025	AE Roses	55	(6)
- * Club domestic league appearances and goals as of 18:48, 13 December 2025 (UTC)

Joel Huertas Cornudella (born 9 May 1995) is a Spanish professional footballer who plays as a midfielder.

== Club career ==
Born in Juneda, Lleida, Catalonia, Huertas joined La Masia in summer 2011, from Lleida Esportiu. Ahead of the 2014–15 season, he was promoted to the reserves and was loaned out to CF Badalona on 25 August 2014.

On 20 August 2015, Huertas joined Lleida Esportiu on loan for the upcoming season along with his teammate Agostinho Cá. On 18 July 2016, he signed permanently for the club on a two-year contract.

On 17 January 2019, Huertas moved abroad and joined Polish I liga club Wigry Suwałki on a one-and-a-half-year deal.

On 8 October 2020 he returned to Spain and signed with CF Igualada.

== Honours ==
Barcelona

- UEFA Youth League: 2013–14
