= Cascante =

- Municipality
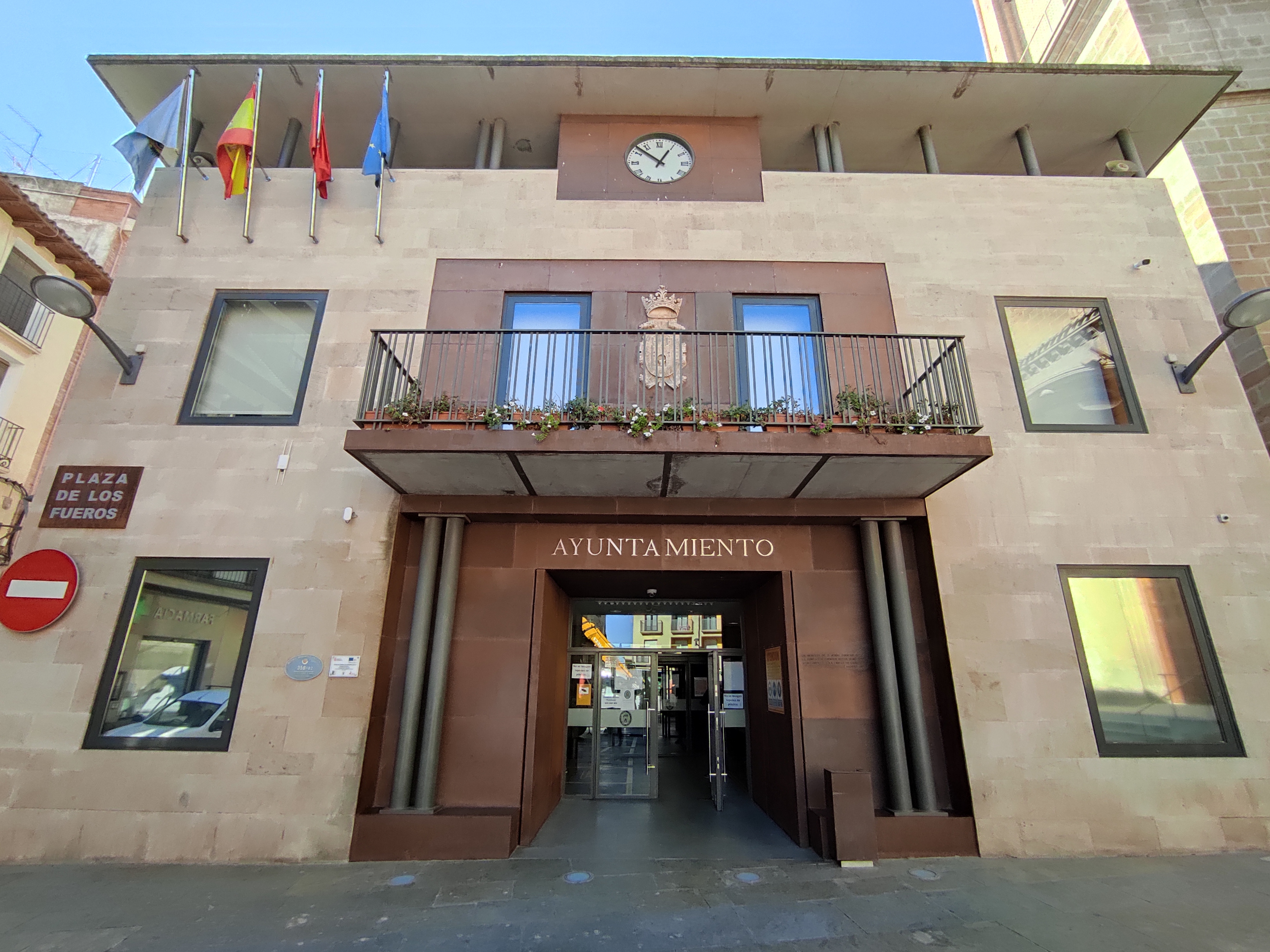
- The town hall of Cascante

- Flag Coat of arms

- Location within Navarre Location within Spain
- Coordinates: 41°59′57″N 1°40′44″W
- Country: Spain
- Autonomous community: Navarre
- Province: Navarre
- Comarca: Merindad de Tudela

Government
  - Mayor: Alberto Añon Jiménez (UPN)
- Elevation: 356 m (1,168 ft)

Population (2025-01-01)
  - Total: 4,231
- Time zone: UTC+1 (CET)
  - Summer (DST): UTC+2 (CEST)
- Postal code: 31520
- Website: www.cascante.com

Cascante is a town and municipality located in the province and autonomous community of Navarre, northern Spain.

During the Roman period, Cascante was known as Cascantum.

== Notable people ==
- Kike Sola, footballer
- Álex Remiro, footballer
- Lucio Urtubia, anarchist
