= Jurgi Oteo =

Spanish footballer

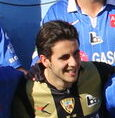

Personal information
- Full name: Jurgi Oteo Gómez
- Date of birth: 29 August 1996 (age 30)
- Place of birth: Barakaldo, Spain
- Height: 1.70 m (5 ft 7 in)
- Position: Winger

Team information
- Current team: Barbastro
- Number: 17

Youth career
- 2006–2008: Athletic Bilbao
- 2008–2011: Santutxu
- 2011–2013: Athletic Bilbao

Senior career*
Years	Team	Apps	(Gls)
2013–2014	Basconia	31	(12)
2014–2017	Bilbao Athletic	70	(9)
2017–2018	Barakaldo	36	(5)
2018–2019	Bilbao Athletic	7	(0)
2019	→ Barakaldo (loan)	17	(3)
2019–2020	Sabadell	5	(0)
2020–2021	Barakaldo	8	(0)
2021–2023	Arenas	72	(4)
2023–2024	Badajoz	25	(1)
2024–	Barbastro	6	(0)

International career
2014	Spain U18	2	(0)
2013–2014	Spain U19	10	(1)
- * Club domestic league appearances and goals as of 13 October 2024

Jurgi Oteo Gómez (born 29 August 1996) is a Spanish professional footballer who plays for Barbastro as a right winger.

== Club career ==
Born in Barakaldo, Biscay, Basque Country, Arias graduated with Athletic Bilbao's youth setup, after a spell at Santutxu FC. He made his debut as a senior with the farm team in the 2013–14 campaign, in Tercera División.

On 12 July 2001, Oteo was promoted to the reserves in Segunda División B. He appeared in 29 matches and scored two goals during the season, as the B-side returned to Segunda División after a 19-year absence.

Oteo made his professional debut on 24 August 2015, starting in a 0–1 home loss against Girona FC. The season ended in relegation, and Oteo remained with the reserve squad for the following campaign, becoming a more regular starter (22 matches, compared with 4 the previous year).

In July 2017, Oteo signed for hometown club Barakaldo CF, also in the third tier. Athletic Bilbao retained an option to sign him back, and although they did not initially exercise this clause, in June 2018 Oteo joined Athletic again after a season playing regularly for Baraka. However, following months of infrequent action for Bilbao Athletic he was loaned back to Barakaldo until the end of the 2018–19 season.

On 4 August 2020, after contributing rarely in CE Sabadell FC's promotion campaign, Oteo rejoined Barakaldo. In February 2021 his contract was terminated and he signed for Arenas Club de Getxo.

On 7 August 2024, Oteo was announced at Barbastro.
