= Gorka Iturraspe =

Spanish footballer (born 1994)

Personal information
- Full name: Gorka Iturraspe Derteano
- Date of birth: 3 May 1994 (age 32)
- Place of birth: Abadiño, Spain
- Height: 1.87 m (6 ft 1 1/2 in)
- Position: Midfielder

Team information
- Current team: Moguer

Youth career
- 2004–2013: Athletic Bilbao

Senior career*
Years	Team	Apps	(Gls)
2013–2014	Basconia	39	(2)
2014–2017	Bilbao Athletic	52	(4)
2017–2019	Amorebieta	65	(6)
2019–2020	Atlético Baleares	23	(4)
2020–2022	Rayo Majadahonda	38	(2)
2022–2023	Amorebieta	22	(1)
2023–2024	Recreativo	30	(0)
2024	Badalona Futur	7	(0)
2025	Don Benito	14	(0)
2025	Badajoz	4	(0)
2026	Bollullos	19	(1)
2026–	Moguer	3	(1)
- * Club domestic league appearances and goals as of 17:58, 3 October 2026 (UTC)

Gorka Iturraspe Derteano (born 3 May 1994) is a Spanish professional footballer who plays as a central midfielder for CD Moguer.

== Club career ==
=== Athletic Bilbao ===
Born in Abadiño, Biscay, Iturraspe began his career in the youth ranks of Athletic Bilbao. He suffered from persistent hip injuries which hampered his development, although he was still able to feature in the final of the 2013 Copa del Rey Juvenil.

After one year with the farm team, Iturraspe made his debut for the reserves on 7 September 2014, playing the final 15 minutes of the 5–1 home Segunda División B rout of SD Leioa in place of Néstor Salinas. On 17 May 2015, the last game of the season, he scored his first goal, in a 2–2 draw against SD Huesca at the Estadio El Alcoraz; his team gained promotion via the play-offs, in which he netted in a 2–0 first round victory over CF Villanovense.

Iturraspe played his first match in a professional league on 30 August 2015, when he started in a 2–1 Segunda División defeat away to Elche CF. He went on to feature regularly during the campaign, although always being replaced or coming on as a substitute due to his physical problems; after they were relegated, he remained with the B side the following season, again making several appearances but never completing 90 minutes.

=== Later career ===
Iturraspe's contract with Athletic was terminated in summer 2017, and he moved to third-division club SD Amorebieta. He scored five goals in 2018–19, the first being on 9 February 2019 in a 1–1 home draw against Gimnástica de Torrelavega.

On 18 July 2019, Iturraspe signed for CD Atlético Baleares still in the third tier. Thirteen months later, after play-off defeat to FC Cartagena on penalties, he joined CF Rayo Majadahonda.

After two years in the Community of Madrid, Iturraspe returned to Amorebieta. He helped the team to return to division two at the first attempt, leaving on 13 July 2023 and agreeing to a deal at Recreativo de Huelva the following week.

Iturraspe continued to compete in lower-league and amateur football until his retirement.

== Personal life ==
Iturraspe's older brother, Ander, also became a professional in the same position. He too came through at Athletic, and went on to represent Spain internationally. While Ander was a long-time teammate of Markel Susaeta, Gorka signed for Rayo Majadahonda alongside the latter's cousin Néstor.

== Honours ==
Amorebieta

- Primera Federación: 2022–23
