= Ablitas =

Coordinates: 41°58′N 1°38′W

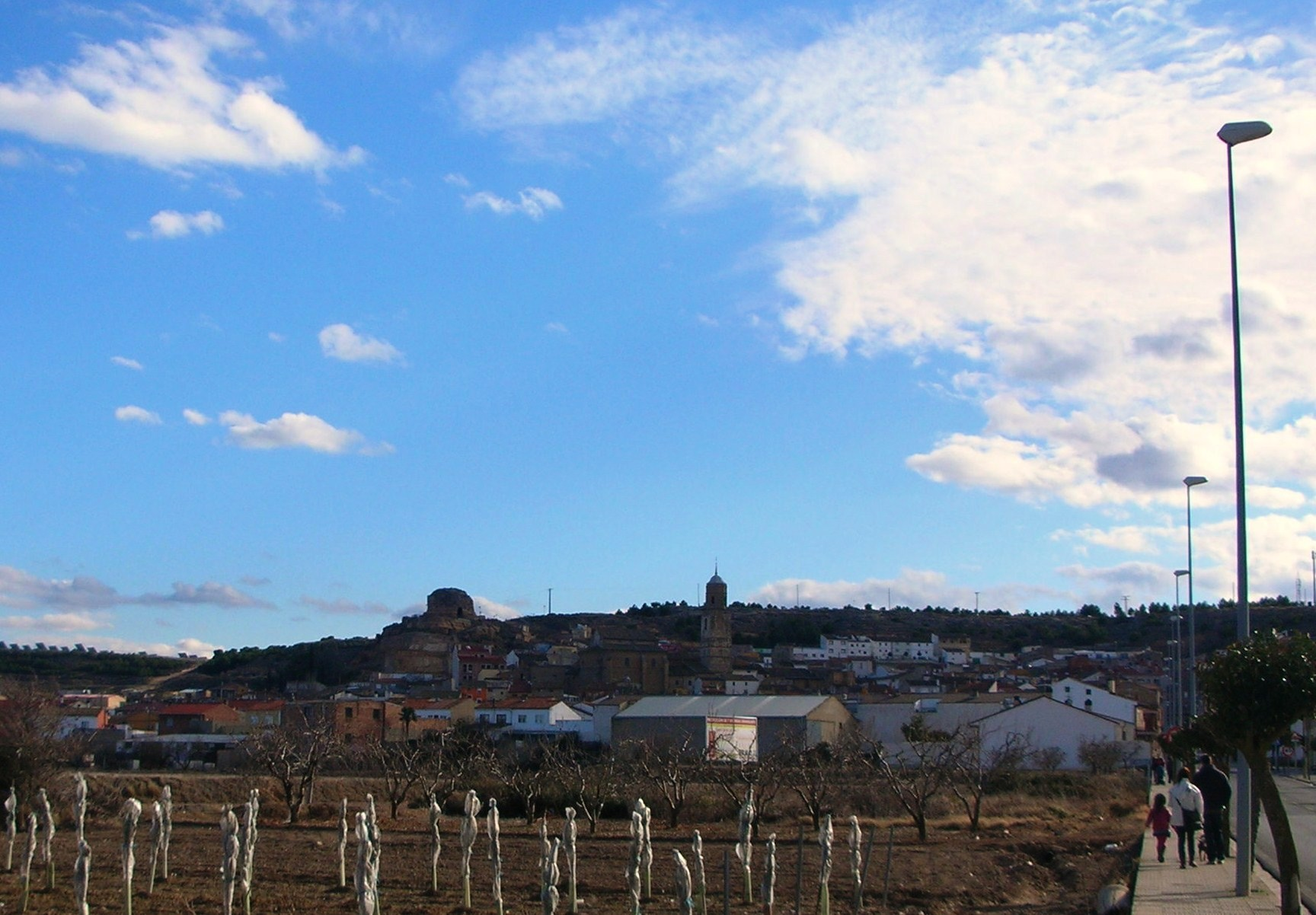

- Coat of arms

- Country: Spain
- Autonomous Community: Navarre

Area
  - Total: 7,748 km^{2} (2,992 sq mi)

Population (2025-01-01)
  - Total: 2,657
  - Density: 0.3429/km^{2} (0.8882/sq mi)
- Time zone: CET
  - Summer (DST): UTC+2
- Postal code: 31523

Ablitas is a town and municipality located in the province and autonomous community of Navarra, northern Spain.

== Demography ==
From:INE Archiv
