= Gorka Santamaría =

Spanish footballer

Personal information
- Full name: Gorka Santamaría Nos
- Date of birth: 3 July 1995 (age 31)
- Place of birth: Bilbao, Spain
- Height: 1.75 m (5 ft 9 in)
- Position: Forward

Team information
- Current team: Intercity
- Number: 9

Youth career
- 2005–2013: Athletic Bilbao

Senior career*
| Years | Team | Apps | (Gls) |
| 2012–2014 | Basconia | 64 | (31) |
| 2014–2017 | Bilbao Athletic | 74 | (18) |
| 2016–2017 | → Cádiz (loan) | 16 | (2) |
| 2017–2018 | Recreativo | 31 | (5) |
| 2018–2019 | Sporting B | 35 | (10) |
| 2019–2022 | Badajoz | 83 | (31) |
| 2022–2023 | Deportivo La Coruña | 13 | (0) |
| 2023 | Badajoz | 19 | (4) |
| 2023–2024 | Gimnàstic | 22 | (0) |
| 2024–2025 | Unionistas | 36 | (4) |
| 2025– | Intercity | 27 | (6) |
- * Club domestic league appearances and goals as of 16 May 2026

Gorka Santamaría Nos (born 3 July 1995) is a Spanish professional footballer who plays as a forward for Segunda Federación club Intercity.

== Club career ==
Born in Bilbao, Biscay, Basque Country, Santamaría joined Athletic Bilbao's youth setup in 2005, aged ten. He made his debuts as a senior with the farm team in the 2012–13 campaign, in Tercera División.

On 26 May 2014, after scoring 20 goals for Basconia, Santamaría was promoted to the reserves in Segunda División B. He was also the club's topscorer during the season with 18 goals in 40 appearances, as the B-side returned to Segunda División after a 19-year absence.

Santamaría made his professional debut on 24 August 2015, starting in a 0–1 home loss against Girona FC. He scored his first goal in the second tier on 6 September, netting his team's first in a 3–1 home win against RCD Mallorca.

On 20 July 2016, Santamaría was loaned to Cádiz CF in the second level, for one year. After being rarely used, he terminated his contract with Athletic on 30 August 2017 and immediately joined Recreativo de Huelva, with his former team retaining an option to reacquire him at the end of the season.

On 6 July 2018, Santamaría signed a one-year contract with another reserve team, Sporting de Gijón B also in the third division. On 3 July 2019, he joined fellow league team CD Badajoz.

On 21 June 2022, after scoring 15 goals for the Blanquinegros in the previous campaign, Santamaría agreed to a one-year contract with Deportivo de La Coruña in Primera Federación. He returned to his previous club the following 12 January, after 14 goalless matches, but was unable to prevent their relegation.

On 26 June 2023, Santamaría signed a two-year contract with Gimnàstic de Tarragona also in division three. On 27 July of the following year, he moved to fellow league team Unionistas de Salamanca CF.

== Personal life ==
Santamaría has two brothers who are also footballers. His identical twin Ander Santamaría is a defender, while their older brother Josu Santamaría is also a striker. Both were also groomed at Athletic.
