= 2018–19 Girona FC season =

Girona FC
2018–19 season
- President: Delfí Geli
- Head coach: Eusebio Sacristán
- Stadium: Montilivi
- La Liga: 18th (relegated)
- Copa del Rey: Quarter-finals
- Top goalscorer: League: Cristhian Stuani (19); All: Cristhian Stuani (20)
Home colours	Away colours	Third colours

During the 2018–19 season, Girona FC participated in La Liga and the Copa del Rey.

== Players ==
=== First-team squad ===
As of 31 August 2018

Note: Flags indicate national team as defined under FIFA eligibility rules; some limited exceptions apply. Players may hold more than one non-FIFA nationality.

No.	Pos.	Nation	Player
1	GK	ESP	Gorka Iraizoz
2	DF	COL	Bernardo Espinosa
3	DF	COL	Johan Mojica
4	DF	ESP	Jonás Ramalho
5	DF	ESP	Pedro Alcalá
6	MF	ESP	Álex Granell (captain)
7	FW	URU	Cristhian Stuani (3rd captain)
8	MF	ESP	Pere Pons
9	MF	ESP	Portu
10	MF	ESP	Borja García
11	MF	ESP	Aday (vice-captain)

No.	Pos.	Nation	Player
12	MF	BRA	Douglas Luiz (on loan from Manchester City)
13	GK	MAR	Yassine Bounou
15	DF	ESP	Juanpe
17	MF	ENG	Patrick Roberts (on loan from Manchester City)
19	FW	HON	Anthony Lozano
20	DF	ESP	Marc Muniesa
21	DF	ESP	Carles Planas
22	FW	CIV	Seydou Doumbia
23	MF	ESP	Aleix García (on loan from Manchester City)
29	MF	ESP	Pedro Porro
30	GK	ESP	José Aurelio Suárez

=== Reserve team ===
Note: Flags indicate national team as defined under FIFA eligibility rules; some limited exceptions apply. Players may hold more than one non-FIFA nationality.

No.	Pos.	Nation	Player
27	FW	CMR	Kévin Soni
28	DF	ESP	Èric Montes

No.	Pos.	Nation	Player
32	MF	KOR	Paik Seung-ho
36	GK	ESP	Marc Vito

=== Out on loan ===
Note: Flags indicate national team as defined under FIFA eligibility rules; some limited exceptions apply. Players may hold more than one non-FIFA nationality.

No.	Pos.	Nation	Player
—	MF	ESP	Sebas Coris (at Gimnàstic until 30 June 2019)
—	MF	ESP	Jairo Izquierdo (at Cádiz until 30 June 2019)

== Transfers ==
=== In ===
Date	Player	From	Type	Fee	Ref
27 June 2018	(Spain) Marc Muniesa	(England) Stoke City	Transfer	£4,500,000	
29 June 2018	(Colombia) Johan Mojica	(Spain) Rayo Vallecano	Transfer	€5,000,000	
30 June 2018	(Spain) Rubén Alcaraz	(Spain) Almería	Loan return		
30 June 2018	(France) Farid Boulaya	(France) Metz	Loan return		
30 June 2018	(Spain) Sebas Coris	(Spain) Osasuna	Loan return		
16 August 2018	(England) Patrick Roberts	(England) Manchester City	Loan		
18 August 2018	(Spain) Jairo Izquierdo	(Spain) Extremadura	Transfer	€200,000	
27 August 2018	(Ivory Coast) Seydou Doumbia	(Italy) Roma	Transfer	Free	
31 August 2018	(Brazil) Douglas Luiz	(England) Manchester City	Loan		

=== Out ===
Date	Player	To	Type	Fee	Ref
14 May 2018	(Spain) Pablo Maffeo	(England) Manchester City	Loan return		
27 June 2018	(Spain) Marc Muniesa	(England) Stoke City	Loan return		
29 June 2018	(Colombia) Johan Mojica	(Spain) Rayo Vallecano	Loan return		
30 June 2018	(Spain) Aleix García	(England) Manchester City	Loan return		
30 June 2018	(Brazil) Douglas Luiz	(England) Manchester City	Loan return		
30 June 2018	(Kenya) Michael Olunga	(China) Guizhou Zhicheng	Loan return		
25 July 2018	(Spain) Eloi Amagat	(United States) New York City	Transfer	Free	
3 August 2018	(Spain) Rubén Alcaraz	(Spain) Valladolid	Transfer	€1,000,000	
10 August 2018	(Spain) Sebas Coris	(Spain) Gimnàstic	Loan		
29 August 2018	(Spain) Jairo Izquierdo	(Spain) Cádiz	Loan		
31 August 2018	(Spain) David Timor	(Spain) Las Palmas	Transfer	€1,500,000	

== Competitions ==
=== Overall ===
Competition	First match	Last match	Starting round	Final position	Record							
Competition	First match	Last match	Starting round	Final position	Pld	W	D	L	GF	GA	GD	Win %
La Liga	17 August 2018	19 May 2019	Matchday 1	18th	38	9	10	19	37	53	−16	23.68
Copa del Rey	31 October 2018	31 January 2019	Round of 32	Quarter-finals	6	1	3	2	11	14	−3	16.67
Total					44	10	13	21	48	67	−19	22.73

Last updated: 18 May 2019
Source: Competitions

=== La Liga ===
==== League table ====
Pos	Team	Pld	W	D	L	GF	GA	GD	Pts	Qualification or relegation
16	Valladolid	38	10	11	17	32	51	−19	41 (Note: Valladolid finished ahead of Celta Vigo on head-to-head points: Celta Vigo 3–3 Valladolid, Valladolid 2–1 Celta Vigo.)	
17	Celta Vigo	38	10	11	17	53	62	−9	41	
18	Girona (R)	38	9	10	19	37	53	−16	37	Relegation to Segunda División
19	Huesca (R)	38	7	12	19	43	65	−22	33	Relegation to Segunda División
20	Rayo Vallecano (R)	38	8	8	22	41	70	−29	32	Relegation to Segunda División

Source: La Liga, Soccerway
Rules for classification: 1) Points; 2) Head-to-head points; 3) Head-to-head goal difference; 4) Goal difference; 5) Goals scored; 6) Fair-play points (Note: Head-to-head record is used only after all the matches between the teams in question have been played)
(R) Relegated

==== Results summary ====
Overall								Home						Away					
Pld	W	D	L	GF	GA	GD	Pts	W	D	L	GF	GA	GD	W	D	L	GF	GA	GD
38	9	10	19	37	53	−16	37	3	6	10	18	28	−10	6	4	9	19	25	−6

Last updated: 18 May 2019.
Source: Competitive matches

==== Results by round ====
Round	1	2	3	4	5	6	7	8	9	10	11	12	13	14	15	16	17	18	19	20	21	22	23	24	25	26	27	28	29	30	31	32	33	34	35	36	37	38
Ground	H	H	A	H	A	H	A	H	A	H	A	H	A	H	A	A	H	A	H	A	H	A	H	A	H	A	H	A	H	A	H	H	A	A	H	A	H	A
Result	D	L	W	W	D	L	D	L	D	W	W	D	W	D	L	L	D	D	D	L	L	L	L	W	D	W	L	W	L	L	L	L	L	L	W	L	L	L
Position	12	16	12	6	6	12	11	15	15	11	10	9	7	8	9	10	9	9	9	14	16	17	17	15	15	14	14	12	13	14	14	14	16	18	17	18	18	18

Updated to match(es) played on 12 May 2019. Source: Competitive matches
A = Away; H = Home; W = Win; D = Draw; L = Loss

==== Matches ====
Win Draw Loss Fixtures

17 August 2018 1	Girona	0–0	Valladolid	Girona
20:15 CEST (UTC+02:00)	Granell (yellow card) 87'	Report	Alcaraz (yellow card) 86'	Stadium: Montilivi; Attendance: 10,246; Referee: Guillermo Cuadra Fernández

26 August 2018 2	Girona	1–4	Real Madrid	Girona
22:15 CEST (UTC+02:00)	García 16'; Porro (yellow card) 33'; Muniesa (yellow card) 65'	Report	Ramos 39' (pen.); Benzema 52' (pen.), 80', (yellow card) 86'; Bale 59'; Carvajal (yellow card) 67'; Vázquez (yellow card) 88'	Stadium: Montilivi; Attendance: 13,383; Referee: Juan Martínez Munuera

31 August 2018 3	Villarreal	0–1	Girona	Villarreal
22:00 CEST (UTC+02:00)	Trigueros (yellow card) 75'; Mario Gaspar (yellow card) 85'; Sansone (yellow card) 89'	Report	Alcalá (yellow card) 23'; Stuani 54'; Aday (yellow card) 56'	Stadium: La Cerámica; Attendance: 15,452; Referee: Eduardo Prieto Iglesias

17 September 2018 4	Girona	3–2	Celta Vigo	Girona
21:00 CEST (UTC+02:00)	Stuani 22', 56'; Alcalá 37'; Douglas Luiz (yellow card) 90+6'	Report	Aspas 34'; Cabral (yellow card) 70' (red card) 90+2'; Beltrán (yellow card) 70'; Boufal 87'	Stadium: Montilivi; Attendance: 9,849; Referee: Javier Alberola Rojas

23 September 2018 5	Barcelona	2–2	Girona	Barcelona
20:45 CEST (UTC+02:00)	Semedo (yellow card) 12'; Arthur (yellow card) 15'; Messi 19'; Lenglet (red card) 35'; Piqué 63', (yellow card) 81'	Report	Stuani (yellow card) 16', (goal) 45', 51'; Espinosa (yellow card) 39'; Juanpe (yellow card) 61'; Alcalá (yellow card) 68'; Portu (yellow card) 69'	Stadium: Camp Nou; Attendance: 76,055; Referee: Jesús Gil Manzano

27 September 2018 6	Girona	0–1	Betis	Girona
22:00 CEST (UTC+02:00)	Alcalá (yellow card) 73'	Report	Boudebouz (yellow card) 37'; Loren 64'; Junior (yellow card) 70'; López (yellow card) 90'	Stadium: Montilivi; Attendance: 11,053; Referee: José González González

30 September 2018 7	Huesca	1–1	Girona	Huesca
12:00 CEST (UTC+02:00)	Ávila (yellow card) 28'; Musto (yellow card) 45'; Melero 72' (pen.); Ferreiro (yellow card) 87'	Report	Stuani 37' (pen.), (yellow card) 39'; Espinosa (yellow card) 70'	Stadium: El Alcoraz; Attendance: 6,786; Referee: Adrián Cordero Vega

6 October 2018 8	Girona	2–3	Eibar	Girona
13:00 CEST (UTC+02:00)	Juanpe (yellow card) 6'; Aday (yellow card) 11'; Portu (yellow card) 15'; Stuani 40', 42'	Report	Charles 12' (pen.); José Ángel (yellow card) 20'; Jordán (yellow card) 34'; Diop (yellow card) 41'; Riesgo (yellow card) 45'; Arbilla 45', (yellow card) 59'; Oliveira (yellow card) 61'; Enrich 72'	Stadium: Montilivi; Attendance: 10,569; Referee: Eduardo Prieto Iglesias

22 October 2018 9	Real Sociedad	0–0	Girona	San Sebastián
21:00 CEST (UTC+02:00)	Rodrigues (yellow card) 41'; Illarramendi (yellow card) 53'; Elustondo (yellow card) 72'	Report	Porro (yellow card) 81'	Stadium: Anoeta; Attendance: 20,997; Referee: Pablo González Fuertes

27 October 2018 10	Girona	2–1	Rayo Vallecano	Girona
13:00 CEST (UTC+02:00)	Portu 34' (pen.), 45'; Douglas Luiz (yellow card) 72'; Lozano (red card) 88'	Report	Gálvez (yellow card) 33', (goal) 61'; Trejo (yellow card) 60'; Moreno (yellow card) 73'	Stadium: Montilivi; Attendance: 6,618; Referee: José Luis Munuera Montero

3 November 2018 11	Valencia	0–1	Girona	Valencia
18:30 CET (UTC+01:00)	Gaya (yellow card) 28'; Coquelin (yellow card) 36'; Gabriel (yellow card) 77'; Kondogbia (yellow card) 79'	Report	Doumbia (yellow card) 30'; Muniesa (yellow card) 39'; Planes (yellow card) 40'; Pons 48'; Bono (yellow card) 59'	Stadium: Mestalla; Attendance: 38,823; Referee: Javier Alberola Rojas

11 November 2018 12	Girona	0–0	Leganés	Girona
20:45 CET (UTC+01:00)	Lozano (yellow card) 90'	Report	Óscar (yellow card) 19'; Eraso (yellow card) 69'; Ojeda (yellow card) 71'; Carrillo (yellow card) 90+1'	Stadium: Montilivi; Attendance: 9,715; Referee: Adrián Cordero Vega

25 November 2018 13	Espanyol	1–3	Girona	Barcelona
18:30 CET (UTC+01:00)	Di. López (yellow card) 41'; Iglesias 74', (yellow card) 75'; Hermoso (yellow card) 89'	Report	Stuani 4', 6', (yellow card) 41'; Ramalho (yellow card) 26'; Planas (yellow card) 28'; Pons (yellow card) 89'; Doumbia 90'	Stadium: RCDE Stadium; Attendance: 22,258; Referee: Alejandro Hernández Hernández

2 December 2018 14	Girona	1–1	Atlético Madrid	Girona
16:15 CET (UTC+01:00)	Stuani 45' (pen.)	Report	Griezmann (yellow card) 17'; Koke (yellow card) 41'; Thomas (yellow card) 71'; Ramalho 82' (o.g.); Costa (yellow card) 89'; Saúl (yellow card) 89'	Stadium: Montilivi; Attendance: 12,104; Referee: Ricardo de Burgos Bengoetxea

10 December 2018 15	Athletic Bilbao	1–0	Girona	Bilbao
21:00 CET (UTC+01:00)	Beñat (yellow card) 55'; Núñez (yellow card) 78'; Capa (yellow card) 81'; Aduriz 90+2' (pen.)	Report	Juanpe (yellow card) 83'	Stadium: San Mamés; Attendance: 34,060; Referee: Eduardo Prieto Iglesias

16 December 2018 16	Sevilla	2–0	Girona	Seville
12:00 CET (UTC+01:00)	Banega 55' (pen.), (yellow card) 85'; Sarabia 64', (yellow card) 89'	Report	Fernández (yellow card) 33'	Stadium: Ramón Sánchez Pizjuán; Attendance: 33,542; Referee: Guillermo Cuadra Fernández

21 December 2018 17	Girona	1–1	Getafe	Girona
19:30 CET (UTC+01:00)	Espinosa 85'; Granell (yellow card) 86'	Report	Foulquier (yellow card) 36'; Ángel 61'; Flamini (yellow card) 90+3'	Stadium: Montilivi; Attendance: 8,450; Referee: Javier Alberola Rojas

4 January 2019 18	Levante	2–2	Girona	Valencia
19:00 CET (UTC+01:00)	Postigo (yellow card) 21' (red card) 69'; Toño (yellow card) 28'; Bardhi (yellow card) 56'; Morales 58'; Coke 86'	Report	Portu 31'; Stuani (yellow card) 35'; García 72'	Stadium: Ciutat de València; Attendance: 19,415; Referee: Alberto Undiano Mallenco

12 January 2019 19	Girona	1–1	Alavés	Girona
18:30 CET (UTC+01:00)	Stuani 12', (yellow card) 61'; Douglas Luiz (yellow card) 40'; Pons (yellow card) 80'; Porro (yellow card) 90+3'	Report	Calleri (yellow card) 21'; Bastón 50'; Laguardia (yellow card) 52'	Stadium: Montilivi; Attendance: 10,303; Referee: José María Sánchez Martínez

20 January 2019 20	Betis	3–2	Girona	Seville
12:00 CET (UTC+01:00)	Tello 12'; Sanabria (yellow card) 45'; Loren 54', (yellow card) 66'; Canales 90+4' (pen.)	Report	Porro (yellow card) 11'; A. García 36'; Fernández (yellow card) 39'; Doumbia 44'; Alcalá (yellow card) 55'; Ramalho (yellow card) 83'	Stadium: Benito Villamarín; Attendance: 47,218; Referee: Adrián Cordero Vega

27 January 2019 21	Girona	0–2	Barcelona	Girona
16:15 CET (UTC+01:00)	Espinosa (yellow card) 29' (yellow-red card) 51'; Bounou (yellow card) 52'; Juanpe (yellow card) 69'; Stuani (yellow card) 89'	Report	Semedo 9'; Lenglet (yellow card) 31'; Vidal (yellow card) 37'; Sergio (yellow card) 43'; Messi 68'	Stadium: Montilivi; Attendance: 14,021; Referee: Pablo González Fuertes

3 February 2019 22	Eibar	3–0	Girona	Eibar
18:30 CET (UTC+01:00)	Peña 37'; Diop (yellow card) 41'; Charles 46', 57' (pen.); Cucurella (yellow card) 90+2'	Report	Alcalá (yellow card) 9'	Stadium: Ipurua; Attendance: 4,419; Referee: José Luis González González

9 February 2019 23	Girona	0–2	Huesca	Girona
20:45 CET (UTC+01:00)	Espinosa (yellow card) 48' (yellow-red card) 68'; García (yellow card) 69'	Report	Ávila 35', 40'; Galán (yellow card) 81'	Stadium: Montilivi; Attendance: 10,662; Referee: Adrián Cordero Vega

17 February 2019 24	Real Madrid	1–2	Girona	Madrid
12:00 CET (UTC+01:00)	Casemiro 25', (yellow card) 88'; Ramos (yellow card) 64' (yellow-red card) 90'	Report	Lozano (yellow card) 48'; Stuani 65' (pen.); Portu 75'; Alcalá (yellow card) 86'	Stadium: Santiago Bernabéu; Attendance: 68,099; Referee: Guillermo Cuadra Fernández

25 February 2019 25	Girona	0–0	Real Sociedad	Girona
21:00 CET (UTC+01:00)	Stuani (yellow card) 32'; Lozano (yellow card) 54'; Douglas Luiz (yellow card) 66'; Granell (yellow card) 70'	Report	Merino (yellow card) 86'	Stadium: Montilivi; Attendance: 10,170; Referee: Eduardo Prieto Iglesias

1 March 2019 26	Rayo Vallecano	0–2	Girona	Madrid
21:00 CET (UTC+01:00)	Suárez (yellow card) 6'; Ba (red card) 60'; Velázquez (yellow card) 75'; Comesaña (yellow card) 89'	Report	Stuani 30', 85'; Ramalho (yellow card) 64'; García (yellow card) 77'; Granell (yellow card) 84'; Alcalá (yellow card) 90+2'	Stadium: Vallecas; Attendance: 12,087; Referee: Santiago Jaime Latre

10 March 2019 27	Girona	2–3	Valencia	Girona
16:15 CET (UTC+01:00)	Ramalho 22'; Stuani 83' (pen.); Alcalá (yellow card) 88'	Report	Guedes 14'; Gayà (yellow card) 20'; Parejo 53'; Roncaglia (yellow card) 62' (yellow-red card) 72'; Diakhaby (yellow card) 82'; Torres 90'	Stadium: Montilivi; Attendance: 11,502; Referee: Carlos del Cerro Grande

16 March 2019 28	Leganés	0–2	Girona	Leganés
20:45 CET (UTC+01:00)	Nyom (yellow card) 32'; Braithwaite (yellow card) 38'; Kravets (yellow card) 45+2'; En-Nesyri (yellow card) 52'; Recio (yellow card) 61'; Omeruo (yellow card) 63'; Carrillo (yellow card) 90+3'; Santos (yellow card) 90+4'	Report	Portu 13', 22'; Muniesa (yellow card) 17'	Stadium: Municipal de Butarque; Attendance: 9,873; Referee: José Luis Munuera Montero

29 March 2019 29	Girona	1–2	Athletic Bilbao	Girona
21:00 CET (UTC+01:00)	Stuani 37'; Juanpe (yellow card) 72'; Portu (yellow card) 80'	Report	Capa (yellow card) 39'; Williams 53'; R. García 59', (yellow card) 63'; Martínez (yellow card) 80'; Beñat (yellow card) 84'	Stadium: Montilivi; Attendance: 10,652; Referee: José María Sánchez Martínez

2 April 2019 30	Atlético Madrid	2–0	Girona	Madrid
19:30 CEST (UTC+02:00)	Arias (yellow card) 48'; Godín 76'; Griezmann 90+4'	Report		Stadium: Wanda Metropolitano; Attendance: 40,863; Referee: Ignacio Iglesias Villanueva

6 April 2019 31	Girona	1–2	Espanyol	Girona
13:00 CEST (UTC+02:00)	Stuani (yellow card) 35', (goal) 80' (pen.); Granell (yellow card) 43'; Pons (yellow card) 58'; Douglas Luiz (yellow card) 73'; Ramalho (yellow card) 90+1'	Report	López (yellow card) 24'; Darder 59'; Sánchez (yellow card) 62'; Bono 89' (o.g.)	Stadium: Montilivi; Attendance: 11,393; Referee: Eduardo Prieto Iglesias

14 April 2019 32	Girona	0–1	Villarreal	Girona
18:30 CEST (UTC+02:00)	Juanpe (yellow card) 74'; Pons (yellow card) 79'	Report	Chukwueze 7', (yellow card) 76'; Fornals (yellow card) 51'; Mario Gaspar (yellow card) 87'; Cáseres (yellow card) 90+5'; Funes Mori (yellow card) 90+6'	Stadium: Montilivi; Attendance: 11,535; Referee: Adrián Cordero Vega

20 April 2019 33	Celta Vigo	2–1	Girona	Vigo
13:00 CEST (UTC+02:00)	Aspas 34'; Yokuşlu (yellow card) 47'; Boufal 69', (yellow card) 70'	Report	Portu 48'; Douglas Luiz (yellow card) 76'	Stadium: Abanca-Balaídos; Attendance: 20,546; Referee: Carlos del Cerro Grande

23 April 2019 34	Valladolid	1–0	Girona	Valladolid
20:30 CEST (UTC+02:00)	Plano (yellow card) 13'; Ünal (yellow card) 24'; Alcaraz (yellow card) 63'; Míchel 67'; Kiko (yellow card) 90+1'	Report	Muniesa (yellow card) 23'; Juanpe (yellow card) 34'; Stuani (yellow card) 90+1'	Stadium: José Zorrilla; Attendance: 19,106; Referee: Juan Martínez Munuera

28 April 2019 35	Girona	1–0	Sevilla	Girona
14:00 CEST (UTC+02:00)	Muniesa (yellow card) 44'; Portu 62'	Report	Mesa (yellow card) 67'; Banega (yellow card) 90', (red card) 90+5'	Stadium: Montilivi; Attendance: 11,281; Referee: José Luis González González

5 May 2019 36	Getafe	2–0	Girona	Getafe
12:00 CEST (UTC+02:00)	Molina 16'; Mata (yellow card) 47'; Bruno (yellow card) 60'; Ángel 77'; Olivera (yellow card) 90+1'	Report	Alcalá (yellow card) 45'; Juanpe (yellow card) 52'; Doumbia (yellow card) 60'; García (red card) 69'	Stadium: Coliseum Alfonso Pérez; Attendance: 10,615; Referee: Alejandro Hernández Hernández

12 May 2019 37	Girona	1–2	Levante	Girona
18:30 CEST (UTC+02:00)	Douglas (yellow card) 48'; Stuani 60'; Lozano (yellow card) 62'	Report	Jason (yellow card) 27'; Bardhi (yellow card) 49', (goal) 86'; Morales 62'; Cabaco (yellow card) 90+5'	Stadium: Montilivi; Attendance: 13,342; Referee: Carlos del Cerro Grande

18 May 2019 38	Alavés	2–1	Girona	Vitoria-Gasteiz
20:45 CEST (UTC+02:00)	Wakaso 40'; Pina (yellow card) 33'; Calleri (yellow card) 55', (goal) 83'; Rolán (yellow card) 56'	Report	Soni (yellow card) 33'; Muniesa (yellow card) 58'; Planas (yellow card) 64'; Portu 86'	Stadium: Mendizorrotza; Attendance: 11,549; Referee: Mario Melero López

=== Copa del Rey ===
==== Round of 32 ====
31 October 2018 First leg	Alavés	2–2	Girona	Vitoria-Gasteiz
20:30 CET (UTC+01:00)	Sobrino 63'; Aguirregabiria 88'; Diéguez (yellow card) 90+3'	Report	Alcalá 18'; Soni (yellow card) 65'; Montes 90+6'	Stadium: Mendizorrotza; Attendance: 9,346; Referee: Adrián Cordero Vega

5 December 2018 Second leg	Girona	2–1 (4–3 agg.)	Alavés	Girona
19:30 CET (UTC+01:00)	Juanpe (yellow card) 33'; Granell 74'; Portu 79'; García (yellow card) 82'	Report	Diéguez (yellow card) 17'; Guidetti (yellow card) 56'; Alcalá 62' (o.g.); Marín (yellow card) 68'	Stadium: Montilivi; Attendance: 9,290; Referee: Antonio Mateu Lahoz

==== Round of 16 ====
9 January 2019 First leg	Girona	1–1	Atlético Madrid	Girona
19:30 CET (UTC+01:00)	Lozano 34'	Report	Griezmann 9'; Montero (yellow card) 27'; Godín (yellow card) 67'	Stadium: Estadi Montilivi; Attendance: 7,770; Referee: Alejandro Hernández Hernández

16 January 2019 Second leg	Atlético Madrid	3–3 (4–4 (a) agg.)	Girona	Madrid
19:30 CET (UTC+01:00)	Kalinić 12'; Correa 66'; Hernandez (yellow card) 69'; Griezmann 84', (yellow card) 85'	Report	Valery 37'; Stuani 59'; Doumbia 88'; Iraizoz (yellow card) 90+2'; Porro (yellow card) 90+3'	Stadium: Wanda Metropolitano; Attendance: 45,221; Referee: Antonio Mateu Lahoz

==== Quarter-finals ====
24 January 2019 First leg	Real Madrid	4–2	Girona	Madrid
21:30 CET (UTC+01:00)	Vázquez 18'; Ramos 42' (pen.), 77', (yellow card) 62'; Nacho (yellow card) 45'; Llorente (yellow card) 66'; Benzema 80'	Report	Lozano 7'; Alcalá (yellow card) 36'; Granell 66' (pen.)	Stadium: Santiago Bernabéu; Attendance: 50,865; Referee: Alberto Undiano Mallenco

31 January 2019 Second leg	Girona	1–3 (3–7 agg.)	Real Madrid	Girona
21:30 CET (UTC+01:00)	Stuani (yellow card) 49'; Porro 71'; Lozano (yellow card) 72'	Report	Benzema 27', 43'; Carvajal (yellow card) 65'; Llorente 76'	Stadium: Montilivi; Attendance: 14,158; Referee: Juan Martínez Munuera

== Statistics ==
=== Appearances and goals ===
Last updated on 18 May 2019

No.	Pos	Nat	Player	Total		La Liga		Copa del Rey	
No.	Pos	Nat	Player	Apps	Goals	Apps	Goals	Apps	Goals
Goalkeepers
1	GK	(Spain) ESP	Gorka Iraizoz	13	0	6+1	0	6	0
13	GK	(Morocco) MAR	Bono	32	0	32	0	0	0
30	GK	(Spain) ESP	José Aurelio Suárez	0	0	0	0	0	0
Defenders
2	DF	(Colombia) COL	Bernardo Espinosa	37	1	31	1	4+2	0
3	DF	(Colombia) COL	Johan Mojica	1	0	0+1	0	0	0
4	DF	(Spain) ESP	Jonás Ramalho	27	1	18+4	1	5	0
5	DF	(Spain) ESP	Pedro Alcalá	29	2	20+5	1	4	1
14	DF	(Spain) ESP	Raúl García	12	0	10	0	2	0
15	DF	(Spain) ESP	Juanpe	36	0	31+2	0	2+1	0
20	DF	(Spain) ESP	Marc Muniesa	24	0	15+4	0	5	0
21	DF	(Spain) ESP	Carles Planas	7	0	4+3	0	0	0
28	DF	(Spain) ESP	Èric Montes	1	1	0	0	0+1	1
Midfielders
6	MF	(Spain) ESP	Álex Granell	37	2	26+6	0	4+1	2
8	MF	(Spain) ESP	Pere Pons	36	1	32+2	1	1+1	0
9	MF	(Spain) ESP	Portu	37	10	33+1	9	1+2	1
10	MF	(Spain) ESP	Borja García	37	2	30+3	1	1+3	1
11	MF	(Spain) ESP	Aday	10	0	8+2	0	0	0
12	MF	(Brazil) BRA	Douglas Luiz	29	0	16+7	0	5+1	0
17	MF	(England) ENG	Patrick Roberts	21	0	6+13	0	2	0
23	MF	(Spain) ESP	Aleix García	34	2	20+11	2	3	0
24	MF	(Spain) ESP	Pedro Porro	34	1	25+7	0	2	1
26	MF	(Republic of the Congo) CGO	Yhoan Andzouana	2	0	0	0	2	0
34	MF	(Spain) ESP	Valery Fernández	22	1	10+7	0	4+1	1
35	MF	(South Korea) KOR	Paik Seung-ho	6	0	0+3	0	2+1	0
Forwards
7	FW	(Uruguay) URU	Cristhian Stuani	34	20	30+2	19	2	1
19	FW	(Honduras) HON	Anthony Lozano	26	2	7+13	0	6	2
22	FW	(Ivory Coast) CIV	Seydou Doumbia	22	3	5+12	2	4+1	1
27	FW	(Senegal) SEN	Kévin Soni	6	0	1+4	0	1	0
27	FW	(Spain) ESP	Álex Pachón	1	0	0	0	0+1	0
