= Kévin Soni =

Cameroonian footballer (born 1998)

Personal information
- Full name: Kévin Olivier Soni
- Date of birth: 17 April 1998 (age 28)
- Place of birth: Douala, Cameroon
- Height: 1.83 m (6 ft 0 in)
- Position: Forward

Youth career
- 2011–2014: Paris Saint-Germain
- 2014–2015: Bordeaux

Senior career*
Years	Team	Apps	(Gls)
2015–2016	Bordeaux B	34	(5)
2015–2017	Bordeaux	2	(0)
2016–2017	→ Pau (loan)	15	(2)
2017	→ Pau B (loan)	2	(1)
2017–2019	Peralada	46	(6)
2019–2021	Girona	7	(0)
2019–2020	→ Espanyol B (loan)	18	(3)
2019–2020	→ Espanyol (loan)	1	(0)
2020–2021	→ Villarreal B (loan)	7	(0)
2021	→ Celta B (loan)	14	(5)
2021–2023	Asteras Tripolis	31	(6)
2022–2023	→ Hatayspor (loan)	3	(0)
2023	→ Adana Demirspor (loan)	0	(0)
2023–2024	Rapid București	5	(0)
2024	→ Hapoel Jerusalem (loan)	7	(1)
2024	Bnei Sakhnin	8	(0)
2025	Železničar Pančevo	10	(1)

International career
2017	Cameroon U20	3	(0)
2019	Cameroon U23	3	(0)
2022	Cameroon	1	(0)
- * Club domestic league appearances and goals as of 12 May 2025

Kévin Olivier Soni (born 17 April 1998) is a Cameroonian professional footballer who plays as a forward.

== Club career ==
Soni was born in Douala, but moved to France at early age. A FC Girondins de Bordeaux youth graduate, he made his first team debut at 21 January 2015 by replacing Nicolas Maurice-Belay in a 1–2 Coupe de France defeat against Paris Saint-Germain FC. On 8 September 2016, he was loaned to Pau FC for one year.

On 21 July 2017, Soni signed for Girona FC, being immediately assigned to the farm team in Segunda División B. The following 22 January, he extended his contract until 2022.

On 8 April 2018, Soni made his first team – and La Liga – debut, coming on as a late substitute for Portu in a 0–5 loss against Real Sociedad. On 31 August of the following year, after Girona's relegation, he was loaned to RCD Espanyol's reserves in the third division, for one year.

On 27 August 2020, Soni agreed to a one-year loan deal with another reserve team, Villarreal CF B also in division three. The following 2 February, he moved to fellow league team Celta de Vigo B, while still owned by Girona.

On 16 June 2021, Soni signed a three-year deal with the Super League Greece club Asteras Tripolis. On 27 November 2021, Soni scored a brace and gave two assists, helping his club prevail over Atromitos 6–2 for Super League, making one of his best appearances with Milan Rastavac on its bench. He was voted man of the match for his performance.

== International career ==
Soni debuted with the Cameroon national team in a 1–0 2022 World Cup qualification loss to Algeria on 25 March 2022.

== Career statistics ==
=== Club ===
As of match played 12 May 2025

Appearances and goals by club, season and competition
Club	Season	League			National Cup		Continental		Total	
Club	Season	Division	Apps	Goals	Apps	Goals	Apps	Goals	Apps	Goals
Bordeaux B	2014–15	Championnat de France Amateur	10	2	—		—		10	2
Bordeaux B	2015–16	Championnat de France Amateur	23	3	—		—		23	3
Bordeaux B	2016–17	Championnat de France Amateur 2	1	0	—		—		1	0
Bordeaux B	Total		34	5	—		—		34	5
Bordeaux	2014–15	Ligue 1	—		1	0	—		1	0
Bordeaux	2015–16	Ligue 1	2	0	1	0	1 (Note: Appearance(s) in UEFA Europa League)	0	4	0
Bordeaux	Total		2	0	2	0	1	0	5	0
Pau (loan)	2016–17	Championnat de France Amateur	15	3	5	2	—		20	5
Pau B (loan)	2016–17	Championnat de France Amateur 2	2	1	—		—		2	1
Peralada	2017–18	Segunda División B	27	3	—		—		27	3
Peralada	2018–19	Segunda División B	19	3	—		—		19	3
Peralada	Total		46	6	—		—		46	6
Girona	2017–18	La Liga	2	0	—		—		2	0
Girona	2018–19	La Liga	5	0	1	0	—		6	0
Girona	Total		7	0	1	0	—		8	0
Espanyol B (loan)	2019–20	Segunda División B	18	3	—		—		18	3
Espanyol (loan)	2019–20	La Liga	1	0	—		—		1	0
Villarreal B (loan)	2020–21	Segunda División B	7	0	—		—		7	0
Celta B (loan)	2020–21	Segunda División B	14	5	—		—		14	5
Asteras Tripolis	2021–22	Super League Greece	29	6	1	0	—		30	6
Asteras Tripolis	2022–23	Super League Greece	2	0	—		—		2	0
Asteras Tripolis	Total		31	6	1	0	—		32	6
Hatayspor (loan)	2022–23	Süper Lig	3	0	—		—		3	0
Adana Demirspor (loan)	2022–23	Süper Lig	0	0	—		—		0	0
Rapid București	2023–24	Liga I	5	0	1	0	—		6	0
Hapoel Jerusalem (loan)	2023–24	Israeli Premier League	7	1	1	0	—		8	1
Bnei Sakhnin	2024–25	Israeli Premier League	8	0	2	0	—		10	0
Železničar Pančevo	2024–25	Serbian SuperLiga	10	1	—		—		10	1
Career total			210	31	13	0	1	0	224	31

=== International stats ===
As of match played 25 March 2022

Appearances and goals by national team and year
National team	Year	Apps	Goals
Cameroon
Cameroon	2022	1	0
Total		1	0

== Honours ==
=== Individual ===
- Asteras Tripolis Player of the Season: 2021–22
