= Juanpe (footballer, born 1991) =

Spanish footballer (born 1991)

Personal information
- Full name: Juan Pedro Ramírez López
- Date of birth: 30 April 1991 (age 35)
- Place of birth: Las Palmas, Spain
- Height: 1.92 m (6 ft 4 in)
- Position: Centre-back

Team information
- Current team: Atlético San Luis
- Number: 6

Youth career
- Doramas
- 2005–2008: Las Palmas

Senior career*
Years	Team	Apps	(Gls)
2008–2010	Las Palmas B	43	(2)
2009–2013	Las Palmas	32	(1)
2013–2014	Racing Santander	27	(4)
2014–2016	Granada	0	(0)
2014–2015	→ Racing Santander (loan)	36	(3)
2015–2016	→ Valladolid (loan)	33	(0)
2016–2025	Girona	236	(12)
2025–	Atlético San Luis	25	(0)
- * Club domestic league appearances and goals as of 18:03, 27 September 2026 (UTC)

Juan Pedro Ramírez López (Spanish pronunciation: [ˈxwam ˈpeðɾo raˈmiɾeθ ˈlopeθ]; (Note: In isolation, Juan is pronounced [ˈxwan].) born 30 April 1991), known as Juanpe ([ˈxwampe]), is a Spanish professional footballer who plays as a centre-back for Liga MX club Atlético San Luis.

== Career ==
Born in Las Palmas, Canary Islands, Juanpe graduated from UD Las Palmas' youth academy. He made his debut as a senior with the reserves in 2008, in the Tercera División.

On 13 June 2009, Juanpe played his first match as a professional, coming on as a late substitute in a 0–0 home draw against Rayo Vallecano in the Segunda División. After a full season with the B side, he was promoted to the first team on 22 June 2010, but spent several months on the sidelines due to a heart condition.

Juanpe scored his first goal in the second division on 21 January 2012, a last-minute header in the 1–1 draw at CE Sabadell FC. On 2 September of the following year he cut ties with the club, and moved to Racing de Santander of Segunda División B two days later.

After achieving promotion to the second tier, Juanpe signed a three-year contract with Granada CF on 12 June 2014, being initially assigned to the reserves in division three. He returned to Racing on 28 August, penning a one-year loan deal.

On 21 July 2015, Juanpe agreed to a one-year extension with the Andalusians, being also loaned to Real Valladolid in a season-long move. On 7 July of the following year, he signed a three-year permanent deal with Girona FC also in the second tier.

Juanpe contributed 34 appearances during the season, helping the club promote to La Liga for the first time ever. He made his debut in the competition on 26 August 2017, replacing Borja García late into a 1–0 home win over Málaga CF. He scored his first goal on 29 September, closing the 3–3 draw at RC Celta de Vigo.

Juanpe took part in five games in Girona's first-ever participation in the UEFA Champions League, scoring in the 2–0 home win over ŠK Slovan Bratislava on 22 October 2024 through a free kick. On 9 June 2025, the 34-year-old left the Estadi Montilivi, with 265 competitive appearances to his credit.

In June 2025, Juanpe moved abroad for the first time by agreeing to a contract at Liga MX side Atlético San Luis.

== Career statistics ==
As of match played 25 May 2025

Appearances and goals by club, season and competition
Club	Season	League			Copa del Rey		Europe		Other		Total	
Club	Season	Division	Apps	Goals	Apps	Goals	Apps	Goals	Apps	Goals	Apps	Goals
Las Palmas	2008–09	Segunda División	1	0	0	0	—		—		1	0
Las Palmas	2010–11	Segunda División	10	0	1	0	—		—		11	0
Las Palmas	2011–12	Segunda División	19	1	0	0	—		—		19	1
Las Palmas	2012–13	Segunda División	2	0	0	0	—		—		2	0
Las Palmas	Total		32	1	1	0	—		—		33	1
Racing Santander (loan)	2013–14	Segunda División B	27	4	5	0	—		3 (Note: Appearances in Segunda División B play-offs)	0	35	4
Granada	2014–15	La Liga	0	0	0	0	—		—		0	0
Granada	2015–16	La Liga	0	0	0	0	—		—		0	0
Granada	Total		0	0	0	0	—		—		0	0
Racing Santander	2014–15	Segunda División	36	3	—		—		—		36	3
Valladolid (loan)	2015–16	Segunda División	33	0	1	0	—		—		34	0
Girona	2016–17	Segunda División	34	2	0	0	—		—		34	2
Girona	2017–18	La Liga	35	5	0	0	—		—		35	5
Girona	2018–19	La Liga	33	0	3	0	—		—		36	0
Girona	2019–20	Segunda División	33	0	0	0	—		4 (Note: Appearances in La Liga play-offs)	0	37	0
Girona	2020–21	Segunda División	15	2	0	0	—		4	0	19	2
Girona	2021–22	Segunda División	38	2	3	0	—		4	0	45	2
Girona	2022–23	La Liga	19	1	0	0	—		—		19	1
Girona	2023–24	La Liga	17	0	4	0	—		—		21	2
Girona	2024–25	La Liga	12	0	2	0	5 (Note: Appearances in UEFA Champions League)	1	—		19	1
Girona	Total		236	12	12	0	5	1	12	0	265	15
Career total			364	18	19	0	5	1	15	0	403	23
