= 2017–18 Girona FC season =

Girona FC
2017–18 season
- President: Delfí Geli
- Head coach: Pablo Machín
- Stadium: Montilivi
- La Liga: 10th
- Copa del Rey: Round of 32
- Top goalscorer: League: Cristhian Stuani (21); All: Cristhian Stuani (21)
Home colours	Away colours	Third colours

Girona FC competed in La Liga for the first time in 2017–18, following their promotion from the Segunda Division. The team also participated in the Copa del Rey.

== Squad ==
As of 21 August 2017

Note: Flags indicate national team as defined under FIFA eligibility rules; some limited exceptions apply. Players may hold more than one non-FIFA nationality.

No.	Pos.	Nation	Player
1	GK	ESP	Gorka Iraizoz
2	DF	COL	Bernardo Espinosa
3	DF	COL	Johan Mojica (on loan from Rayo Vallecano)
4	DF	ESP	Jonás Ramalho
5	DF	ESP	Pedro Alcalá
6	MF	ESP	Álex Granell (2nd captain)
7	FW	URU	Cristhian Stuani
8	MF	ESP	Pere Pons (3rd captain)
9	MF	ESP	Portu
10	MF	ESP	Eloi Amagat (captain)
11	MF	ESP	Aday
12	MF	BRA	Douglas Luiz (on loan from Manchester City)

No.	Pos.	Nation	Player
13	GK	MAR	Yassine Bounou
15	DF	ESP	Juanpe
17	FW	COL	Marlos Moreno (on loan from Manchester City)
18	FW	NGR	Olarenwaju Kayode (on loan from Manchester City)
19	MF	FRA	Farid Boulaya
20	DF	ESP	Marc Muniesa (on loan from Stoke City)
21	DF	ESP	Carles Planas
23	MF	ESP	Aleix García (on loan from Manchester City)
24	MF	ESP	Borja García
25	DF	ESP	Pablo Maffeo (on loan from Manchester City)
30	GK	ESP	José Aurelio Suárez

=== Transfers ===
- List of Spanish football transfers summer 2017#Girona

==== In ====
Date	Player	From	Type	Fee	Ref
14 June 2017	(Spain) Gorka Iraizoz	(Spain) Athletic Bilbao	Transfer	Free	
30 June 2017	(Spain) Carles Mas	(Spain) Gavà	Loan return	Free	
30 June 2017	(Spain) Albert Vivancos	(Spain) Llagostera	Loan return	Free	
30 June 2017	(Spain) David Oliveros	(Spain) Hospitalet	Loan return	Free	
7 July 2017	(Colombia) Bernardo Espinosa	(England) Middlesbrough	Transfer	€4,500,000	
8 July 2017	(Spain) José Aurelio Suárez	(Spain) Barcelona B	Transfer	Free	
13 July 2017	(Spain) Carles Planas	(Spain) Celta Vigo	Transfer	Free	
21 July 2017	(Uruguay) Cristhian Stuani	(England) Middlesbrough	Transfer	Undisclosed	
25 July 2017	(Algeria) Farid Boulaya	(France) Bastia	Transfer	Undisclosed	
31 July 2017	(Spain) Pablo Maffeo	(England) Manchester City	Loan	Free	
1 August 2017	(Spain) Aleix García	(England) Manchester City	Loan	Free	
1 August 2017	(Colombia) Marlos Moreno	(England) Manchester City	Loan	Free	
1 August 2017	(Brazil) Douglas Luiz	(England) Manchester City	Loan	Free	
11 August 2017	(Spain) Marc Muniesa	(England) Stoke City	Loan	Free	
18 August 2017	(Nigeria) Olarenwaju Kayode	(England) Manchester City	Loan	Free	
18 August 2017	(Colombia) Johan Mojica	(Spain) Rayo Vallecano	Loan	Free	
30 January 2018	(Honduras) Anthony Lozano	(Spain) Barcelona B	Transfer	€1,700,000	

==== Out ====
Date	Player	To	Type	Fee	Ref
13 June 2017	(Spain) Richy	Retired			
13 June 2017	(Spain) Felipe Sanchón	(Spain) Sabadell	Transfer	Free	
17 June 2017	(Spain) Carles Mas	(Spain) Olot	Transfer	Free	
30 June 2017	(Spain) Pablo Marí	(England) Manchester City	Loan return	Free	
30 June 2017	(Spain) Pablo Maffeo	(England) Manchester City	Loan return	Free	
30 June 2017	(Spain) Cifu	(Spain) Málaga	Loan return	Free	
30 June 2017	(Spain) Juan Cámara	(Spain) Barcelona B	Loan return	Free	
30 June 2017	(Colombia) Johan Mojica	(Spain) Rayo Vallecano	Loan return	Free	
30 June 2017	(Italy) Samuele Longo	(Italy) Internazionale	Loan return	Free	
1 July 2017	(Spain) Sebastián Coris	(Spain) Osasuna	Loan	Free	
5 July 2017	(Spain) René	(Spain) Almería	Transfer	Free	
11 July 2017	(Spain) Rubén Alcaraz	(Spain) Almería	Loan	Free	
14 July 2017	(Spain) Cristian Herrera	(Spain) Lugo	Transfer	Free	
17 July 2017	(Spain) Fran Sandaza	(Qatar) Al Ahli	Loan	Free	
22 July 2017	(Spain) Albert Vivancos	(Spain) UCAM Murcia	Transfer	Free	
23 July 2017	(Spain) David Oliveros	(Spain) Lleida Esportiu	Transfer	Free	
22 August 2017	(Spain) Kiko Olivas	(Spain) Real Valladolid	Transfer	Free	

== Competitions ==
=== Overall ===
Competition	Final position
La Liga	10th
Copa del Rey	Round of 32

=== Liga ===
==== League table ====
Pos	Team	Pld	W	D	L	GF	GA	GD	Pts
8	Getafe	38	15	10	13	42	33	+9	55
9	Eibar	38	14	9	15	44	50	−6	51 (Note: Eibar finished ahead of Girona on head-to-head points: Eibar 4–1 Girona, Girona 1–4 Eibar.)
10	Girona	38	14	9	15	50	59	−9	51
11	Espanyol	38	12	13	13	36	42	−6	49 (Note: Head-to-head points: Espanyol 8, Real Sociedad 4, Celta Vigo 4 (Espanyol 2–1 Real Sociedad, Real Sociedad 1–1 Espanyol, Espanyol 2–1 Celta Vigo, Celta Vigo 2–2 Espanyol, Real Sociedad 1–2 Celta Vigo, Celta Vigo 2–3 Real Sociedad).)
12	Real Sociedad	38	14	7	17	66	59	+7	49

Source: La Liga, Soccerway
Rules for classification: 1) Points; 2) Head-to-head points; 3) Head-to-head goal difference; 4) Goal difference; 5) Goals scored; 6) Fair-play points (Note: Head-to-head record is used only after all the matches between the teams in question have been played)

==== Matches ====
Win Draw Loss Fixtures

19 August 2017 1	Girona	2–2	Atlético Madrid	Girona
20:15 CEST (UTC+02:00)	Stuani 22', 25', (yellow card) 45'; Pons (yellow card) 90+4'	Report	Carrasco (yellow card) 28'; Saúl (yellow card) 50'; Hernandez (yellow card) 61'; Griezmann (yellow card) 67' (red card) 67'; Correa 78'; Giménez 85'	Stadium: Montilivi; Attendance: 11,342; Referee: Juan Martínez Munuera

26 August 2017 2	Girona	1–0	Málaga	Girona
20:15 CEST (UTC+02:00)	Granell (yellow card) 22'; Alcalá 28'; Iraizoz (yellow card) 55'; Muniesa (yellow card) 56'	Report	Ontiveros (yellow card) 58'; Recio (yellow card) 63'; Cecchini (yellow card) 64'; Mula (yellow card) 90+4'	Stadium: Montilivi; Attendance: 9,966; Referee: Santiago Jaime Latre

10 September 2017 3	Athletic Bilbao	2–0	Girona	Bilbao
16:15 CEST (UTC+02:00)	Beñat (yellow card) 21'; Muniain 25'; Aduriz 53'; García (yellow card) 64'; San José (yellow card) 68'; Laporte (yellow card) 90'	Report	Alcalá (yellow card) 24'; Granell (yellow card) 27'; Espinosa (yellow card) 40'; Aday (yellow card) 56'; Douglas Luiz (yellow card) 80'; Stuani (yellow card) 87'	Stadium: San Mamés; Attendance: 39,952; Referee: Daniel Trujillo Suárez

17 September 2017 4	Girona	0–1	Sevilla	Girona
16:15 CEST (UTC+02:00)	Juanpe (yellow card) 25'; Espinosa (yellow card) 57'	Report	Nzonzi (yellow card) 21'; Corchia (yellow card) 45'; Muriel 69'; Carriço (yellow card) 71'; Lenglet (yellow card) 85'; Vázquez (yellow card) 90'	Stadium: Montilivi; Attendance: 11,032; Referee: Ricardo de Burgos Bengoetxea

20 September 2017 5	Leganés	0–0	Girona	Leganés
20:00 CEST (UTC+02:00)	Rubén Pérez (yellow card) 78'; Zaldúa (yellow card) 90'	Report	Stuani (yellow card) 30'; Juanpe (yellow card) 64'; Douglas Luiz (yellow card) 73'	Stadium: Butarque; Attendance: 9,090; Referee: Mario Melero López

23 September 2017 6	Girona	0–3	Barcelona	Girona
20:45 CEST	Maffeo (yellow card) 23'; Aday (yellow card) 41'; Kayode (yellow card) 83'		Aday 17' (o.g.); Iraizoz 48' (o.g.); L. Suárez 69'	Stadium: Montilivi; Attendance: 13,305; Referee: José María Sánchez Martínez (Region of Murcia)

29 September 2017 7	Celta Vigo	3–3	Girona	Vigo
21:00 CEST (UTC+02:00)	Sisto 8'; M. Gómez 16', (yellow card) 42'; Wass 76'; Mor (yellow card) 90+3'	Report	Portu 10'; Stuani 14', (yellow card) 44'; Espinosa (yellow card) 21'; Juanpe (yellow card) 53', (goal) 86'; Alcalá (yellow card) 90'; Pons (yellow card) 90+2'	Stadium: Balaídos; Referee: Pablo González Fuertes

15 October 2017 8	Girona	1–2	Villarreal	Girona
16:15 CEST (UTC+02:00)	Portu (yellow card) 31'; Stuani 40', (yellow card) 90'; Kayode (yellow card) 86'	Report	Bakambu 9', 20', (yellow card) 79'; Álvaro (yellow card) 59'; Rodri (yellow card) 90'; Bacca (yellow card) 90+2'	Stadium: Montilivi; Attendance: 9,935; Referee: Carlos del Cerro Grande

23 October 2017 9	Deportivo La Coruña	1–2	Girona	A Coruña
21:00 CEST (UTC+02:00)	Albentosa (yellow card) 24'; Pérez 51' (pen.); Cartabia (yellow card) 76'; Guilherme (yellow card) 83'	Report	Aday 25' (pen.); Pons (yellow card) 27'; Ramalho (yellow card) 50'; Granell (yellow card) 66'; Portu 71'; Mojica (yellow card) 80'; A. García (yellow card) 90'; Espinosa (yellow card) 90+5'; Douglas Luiz (yellow card) 90+6'	Stadium: Riazor; Attendance: 17,588; Referee: Jesús Gil Manzano

29 October 2017 10	Girona	2–1	Real Madrid	Girona
16:15 CEST (UTC+02:00)	Stuani 54'; Portu 58'; Aday (yellow card) 87'; Mojica (yellow card) 90+4'	Report	Isco 12'; Modrić (yellow card) 45'	Stadium: Montilivi; Attendance: 13,382; Referee: Alejandro Hernández Hernández

5 November 2017 11	Levante	1–2	Girona	Valencia
12:00 CET (UTC+01:00)	Chema (yellow card) 11'; Postigo (yellow card) 70'; Lerma (yellow card) 86'; Ünal 90+2'	Report	Juanpe (yellow card) 18'; Muniesa (yellow card) 44'; B. García 58'; Maffeo (yellow card) 61'; Pons (yellow card) 72'; Stuani 83'	Stadium: Ciutat de València; Attendance: 17,524; Referee: José Luis Munuera Montero

17 November 2017 12	Girona	1–1	Real Sociedad	Girona
21:00 CET (UTC+01:00)	Maffeo (yellow card) 40'; Mojica (yellow card) 43'; Espinosa (yellow card) 45'; Stuani 64'; Portu (yellow card) 90+1'	Report	Willian José 7'; Llorente (yellow card) 37'; Januzaj (yellow card) 47'	Stadium: Montilivi; Attendance: 10,136; Referee: Ignacio Iglesias Villanueva

25 November 2017 13	Real Betis	2–2	Girona	Seville
18:30 CET (UTC+01:00)	Guardado 85'; Durmisi (yellow card) 86'; García (yellow card) 88'; Tello 90+5'	Report	Portu 45+1', 90+4'; Granell (yellow card) 84'	Stadium: Benito Villamarín; Attendance: 45,772; Referee: Carlos del Cerro Grande

4 December 2017 14	Girona	2–3	Alavés	Girona
21:00 CET (UTC+01:00)	Stuani 59'; Juanpe 62'; Bounou (yellow card) 87'	Report	Aguirregabiria (yellow card) 27'; Duarte (yellow card) 57'; Ibai 71', 87' (pen.), 90+3'	Stadium: Montilivi; Attendance: 7,316; Referee: Javier Alberola Rojas

11 December 2017 15	Espanyol	0–1	Girona	Cornellà de Llobregat
21:00 CET (UTC+01:00)	Granero (yellow card) 65'	Report	Timor 45+1', (yellow card) 58'; Stuani (yellow card) 59'; Pons (yellow card) 79'	Stadium: RCDE Stadium; Attendance: 13,846; Referee: José González González

17 December 2017 16	Girona	1–0	Getafe	Girona
12:00 CET (UTC+01:00)	Stuani 5'; Granell (yellow card) 86'; Timor (yellow card) 90'	Report	Arambarri (yellow card) 22'; Mora (yellow card) 35'; Cala (yellow card) 51'; Antunes (yellow card) 65'; Molina (yellow card) 79'; Ángel (yellow card) 90'	Stadium: Montilivi; Attendance: 9,917; Referee: Alberto Undiano Mallenco

21 December 2017 17	Eibar	4–1	Girona	Eibar
19:30 CET (UTC+01:00)	Charles 10'; Inui 49', 54'; D. García (yellow card) 25'; Jordán 90+2'	Report	Timor (yellow card) 13', (goal) 26'; Maffeo (yellow card) 30'	Stadium: Ipurua; Attendance: 4,867; Referee: Iglesias Villanueva

6 January 2018 18	Valencia	2–1	Girona	Valencia
16:15 CET (UTC+01:00)	Pereira (yellow card) 24'; Ramalho 27' (o.g.); Garay (yellow card) 35'; Parejo 48' (pen.); Kondogbia (yellow card) 76'; Maksimović (yellow card) 85'; Gabriel (yellow card) 86'	Report	Portu 8', (yellow card) 27'; Mojica (yellow card) 16'; Espinosa (yellow card) 55'; Stuani (yellow card) 76'; Timor (yellow card) 84'	Stadium: Mestalla; Attendance: 27,930; Referee: David Fernández Borbalán

13 January 2018 19	Girona	6–0	Las Palmas	Girona
13:00 CET (UTC+01:00)	Stuani 25' (pen.); Granell (yellow card) 52'; Pons (yellow card) 54'; Olunga 57', 70', 79'; B. García 64'; Portu 74'	Report	J. Castellano (yellow card) 24'; Peñalba (yellow card) 53'; Viera (yellow card) 53'; Calleri (yellow card) 54'; D. García (yellow card) 57'	Stadium: Montilivi; Attendance: 10,037; Referee: Mario Melero López

20 January 2018 20	Atlético Madrid	1–1	Girona	Madrid
16:15 CET (UTC+01:00)	Griezmann 34'; Thomas (yellow card) 45'; Vrsaljko (yellow card) 66'; Giménez (yellow card) 81'; Oblak (yellow card) 90'	Report	Juanpe (yellow card) 31'; Aday (yellow card) 37'; Portu 73'; Espinosa (yellow card) 82'	Stadium: Wanda Metropolitano; Attendance: 55,076; Referee: Ricardo de Burgos Bengoetxea

27 January 2018 21	Málaga	0–0	Girona	Málaga
18:30 CET (UTC+01:00)	Castro (yellow card) 68' (yellow-red card) 78'	Report	Ramalho (yellow card) 34'	Stadium: La Rosaleda; Attendance: 22,260; Referee: Alberto Undiano Mallenco

4 February 2018 22	Girona	2–0	Athletic Bilbao	Girona
18:30 CET (UTC+01:00)	Stuani 7' (pen.), 65'; Maffeo (yellow card) 46'	Report	Núñez (yellow card) 58'	Stadium: Montilivi; Attendance: 9,362; Referee: José Luis Munuera Montero

11 February 2018 23	Sevilla	1–0	Girona	Seville
12:00 CET (UTC+01:00)	Muriel (yellow card) 40'; Pizarro (yellow card) 43'; Sarabia 46'	Report	Borja G. (yellow card) 43'; Aday (yellow card) 45'	Stadium: Ramón Sánchez Pizjuán; Attendance: 33,303; Referee: Jaime Latre

18 February 2018 24	Girona	3–0	Leganés	Girona
21:00 CET (UTC+01:00)	Stuani 23' (pen.); Granell (yellow card) 31'; Portu 36'; Aleix García (yellow card) 49'; Borja G. (yellow card) 71'; Juanpe 85'	Report	Mantovani (yellow card) 22'; Gumbau (yellow card) 67'; Amrabat (yellow card) 77'; Zaldúa (yellow card) 84'; Rubén Pérez (yellow card) 84'	Stadium: Montilivi; Attendance: 9,142; Referee: Antonio Mateu Lahoz

24 February 2018 25	Barcelona	6–1	Girona	Barcelona
20:45 CET	Suárez 5', 44', 76'; Messi 30', 36'; Coutinho 66'; Jordi Alba (yellow card) 87'	Report	Portu 3'; Juanpe (yellow card) 62'	Stadium: Camp Nou; Attendance: 85,417; Referee: Alberola Rojas (Castilla-La Mancha)

28 February 2018 26	Girona	1–0	Celta Vigo	Girona
21:30 CET (UTC+01:00)	Portu 14'; Maffeo (yellow card) 26'; Stuani (yellow card) 53'; García (yellow card) 86'	Report	Jonny (yellow card) 60'; Emre Mor (yellow card) 80'	Stadium: Montilivi; Referee: Daniel Trujillo Suárez

4 March 2018 27	Villarreal	0–2	Girona	Villarreal
13:00 CET (UTC+01:00)	Raba (yellow card) 2'; Costa (yellow card) 34'; Bonera (yellow card) 39'; Mario Gaspar (yellow card) 61'	Report	Stuani 16'; Granell (yellow card) 42'; Lozano 80'	Stadium: La Cerámica; Attendance: 14,540; Referee: Pablo González Fuertes

9 March 2018 28	Girona	2–0	Deportivo La Coruña	Girona
21:00 CET (UTC+01:00)	Stuani 21'; Juanpe 57'; Pons (yellow card) 65'	Report	Muntari (yellow card) 45'; Navarro (yellow card) 56'; Albentosa (yellow card) 77'; Mosquera (yellow card) 80'	Stadium: Montilivi; Attendance: 10,663; Referee: Alberto Undiano Mallenco

18 March 2018 29	Real Madrid	6–3	Girona	Madrid
20:45 CEST (UTC+01:00)	Ronaldo 11', 47', 64', 90+1'; Carvajal (yellow card) 52'; Vázquez 59'; Bale 86'	Report	Stuani 29', 67'; Mojica (yellow card) 30'; Juanpe 88'	Stadium: Santiago Bernabéu; Referee: Jesús Gil Manzano

31 March 2018 30	Girona	1–1	Levante	Girona
--:-- CEST (UTC+02:00)	Granell 54'; Maffeo (yellow card) 90+1'	Report	Roger (yellow card) 28'; Cabaco (yellow card) 29'; Morales 68'; Lerma (yellow card) 78'	Stadium: Montilivi; Attendance: 11,159; Referee: Ricardo de Burgos Bengoetxea

8 April 2018 31	Real Sociedad	5–0	Girona	San Sebastián
--:-- CEST (UTC+02:00)	Canales 11', (yellow card) 65'; Januzaj 35'; Moreno (yellow card) 40'; Oyarzabal 71', 85', 88'	Report	Granell (yellow card) 65'; Mojica (yellow card) 66'	Stadium: Anoeta; Attendance: 18,007; Referee: José Luis Munuera Montero

15 April 2018 32	Girona	0–1	Real Betis	Girona
--:-- CEST (UTC+02:00)	Ramalho (yellow card) 7'; Maffeo (yellow card) 14'; Muniesa (yellow card) 79'; Granell (yellow card) 86'; Portu (yellow card) 90+3'; Aday (yellow card) 90+3'; Juanpe (yellow card) 90+3'	Report	Loren 36', (yellow card) 58'; Bartra (yellow card) 42'; Guardado (yellow card) 48'; Mandi (yellow card) 49'; García (yellow card) 89'	Stadium: Montilivi; Attendance: 10,991; Referee: Santiago Jaime Latre

18 April 2018 33	Alavés	1–2	Girona	Vitoria-Gasteiz
19:30 CEST (UTC+02:00)	Ely (yellow card) 83'; Wakaso (yellow card) 89'; Pina 90'; Guidetti (yellow card) 90+2'; M. García (yellow card) 90+4'	Report	A. García 59'; Bounou (yellow card) 80'; Stuani 86' (pen.); Maffeo (yellow card) 89'; Timor (yellow card) 90+5'; Alcalá (yellow card) 90+5'	Stadium: Mendizorrotza; Attendance: 18,366; Referee: Pablo González Fuertes

22 April 2018 34	Girona	0–2	Espanyol	Girona
--:-- CEST (UTC+02:00)	Aday (yellow card) 73'	Report	C. Sánchez (yellow card) 38'; Gerard 43', 55'; V. Sánchez (yellow card) 48'	Stadium: Montilivi; Attendance: 12,034; Referee: Javier Alberola Rojas

29 April 2018 35	Getafe	1–1	Girona	Getafe
12:00 CEST (UTC+02:00)	Amath 18', (yellow card) 34'; Bruno (yellow card) 42'; Suárez (red card) 43'; Mora (yellow card) 63'; Fajr (yellow card) 73'; Antunes (yellow card) 76'; Molinero (yellow card) 86'	Report	Alcalá (yellow card) 35'; Timor (yellow card) 39'; Stuani 45' (pen.); Maffeo (yellow card) 47'; Aday (yellow card) 72'	Stadium: Coliseum Alfonso Pérez; Attendance: 8,011; Referee: Alejandro Hernández Hernández

6 May 2018 36	Girona	1–4	Eibar	Girona
13:00 CEST (UTC+02:00)	Timor (yellow card) 42'; Aday 55'; Portu (yellow card) 82'	Report	Kike 9', 38', (yellow card) 70'; García (yellow card) 58'; Diop (yellow card) 62'; Alejo (yellow card) 66'; Orellana (yellow card) 75'; Jordán 80'; Inui 89'	Stadium: Montilivi; Attendance: 9,706; Referee: Daniel Trujillo Suárez

13 May 2018 37	Girona	0–1	Valencia	Girona
--:-- CEST (UTC+02:00)	Maffeo (yellow card) 34'; Timor (yellow card) 90'	Report	Soler (yellow card) 29'; Zaza (yellow card) 60'; Vietto 61'; Lato (yellow card) 76'	Stadium: Montilivi; Attendance: 10,725; Referee: Ignacio Iglesias Villanueva

20 May 2018 38	Las Palmas	1–2	Girona	Las Palmas
18:30 CEST (UTC+02:00)	Calleri 14' (pen.); Etebo (yellow card) 58'	Report	Stuani 5', 42'; Pons (yellow card) 13'; Aday (yellow card) 21'	Stadium: Gran Canaria; Attendance: 6,362; Referee: Santiago Jaime Latre

=== Copa del Rey ===
==== Round of 32 ====
26 October 2017 First leg	Girona	0–2	Levante	Girona
20:30 CEST	Ramalho (yellow card) 7'; Kayode (yellow card) 78'	Report	Lukić (yellow card) 1'; Samu (yellow card) 31'; Boateng 40'; Morales (yellow card) 45'; Doukouré 62'; Ivi (yellow card) 90+1'	Stadium: Montilivi; Attendance: 6,446; Referee: José María Sánchez Martínez

28 November 2017 Second leg	Levante	1–1 (3–1 agg.)	Girona	Valencia
21:30 CET	Hacen (yellow card) 51'; Cabaco (yellow card) 61'; Morales 75'; Jason (yellow card) 82'; Samu (yellow card) 90'	Report	Mojica 33'; Douglas Luiz (yellow card) 44'	Stadium: Ciutat de València; Attendance: 6,858; Referee: Alberto Undiano Mallenco

== Statistics ==
=== Appearances and goals ===
No.	Pos	Nat	Player	Total		La Liga		Copa del Rey	
No.	Pos	Nat	Player	Apps	Goals	Apps	Goals	Apps	Goals
Goalkeepers
1	GK	(Spain) ESP	Gorka Iraizoz	10	0	8+1	0	1	0
13	GK	(Morocco) MAR	Yassine Bounou	31	0	30	0	1	0
36	GK	(Poland) POL	Marcel Lizak	0	0	0	0	0	0
Defenders
2	DF	(Colombia) COL	Bernardo Espinosa	35	0	32+2	0	1	0
3	DF	(Colombia) COL	Johan Mojica	32	1	22+8	0	2	1
4	DF	(Spain) ESP	Jonás Ramalho	28	0	25+1	0	2	0
5	DF	(Spain) ESP	Pedro Alcalá	8	1	8	1	0	0
15	DF	(Spain) ESP	Juanpe	35	5	34+1	5	0	0
20	DF	(Spain) ESP	Marc Muniesa	14	0	13	0	1	0
21	DF	(Spain) ESP	Carles Planas	7	0	2+3	0	2	0
25	DF	(Spain) ESP	Pablo Maffeo	34	0	32+1	0	1	0
Midfielders
6	MF	(Spain) ESP	Álex Granell	35	1	33+1	1	1	0
8	MF	(Spain) ESP	Pere Pons	31	0	30+1	0	0	0
9	MF	(Spain) ESP	Portu	37	11	35+2	11	0	0
11	MF	(Spain) ESP	Aday	32	2	20+11	2	0+1	0
12	MF	(Brazil) BRA	Douglas Luiz	17	0	1+14	0	2	0
16	MF	(Spain) ESP	David Timor	19	2	10+7	2	2	0
23	MF	(Spain) ESP	Aleix García	21	1	7+13	1	1	0
24	MF	(Spain) ESP	Borja García	38	2	34+3	2	0+1	0
Forwards
7	FW	(Uruguay) URU	Cristhian Stuani	33	21	32+1	21	0	0
14	FW	(Kenya) KEN	Michael Olunga	16	3	4+10	3	2	0
19	FW	(Honduras) HON	Anthony Lozano	14	1	4+10	1	0	0
29	FW	(Spain) ESP	Pedro Porro	1	0	0	0	0+1	0
Players transferred out during the season
10	MF	(Spain) ESP	Eloi Amagat	2	0	0+2	0	0	0
17	FW	(Colombia) COL	Marlos Moreno	4	0	0+2	0	2	0
18	FW	(Nigeria) NGR	Olarenwaju Kayode	13	0	2+10	0	0+1	0
19	MF	(France) FRA	Farid Boulaya	1	0	0	0	0+1	0

Last updated: 30 May 2018
Source: BDFutbol
