= Pablo Maffeo =

Spanish footballer (born 1997)

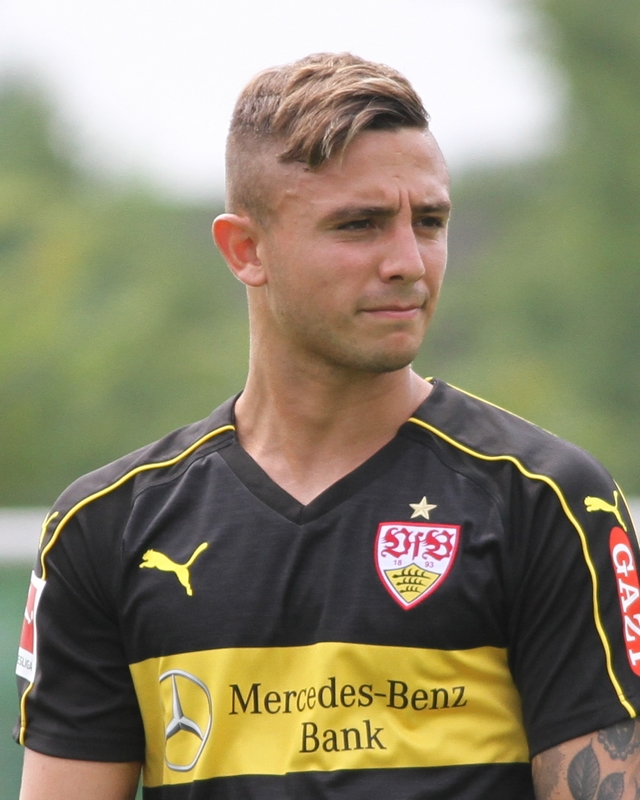
- Maffeo with VfB Stuttgart in 2018

Personal information
- Full name: Pablo Carmine Maffeo Becerra
- Date of birth: 12 July 1997 (age 29)
- Place of birth: Sant Joan Despí, Spain
- Height: 1.72 m (5 ft 7 1/2 in)
- Position: Right-back

Team information
- Current team: Valencia (on loan from Olympiacos)
- Number: 24

Youth career
- 2002–2003: Levante Las Planas
- 2003–2013: Espanyol
- 2013–2015: Manchester City

Senior career*
| Years | Team | Apps | (Gls) |
| 2013 | Espanyol B | 1 | (0) |
| 2015–2018 | Manchester City | 0 | (0) |
| 2016 | → Girona (loan) | 10 | (0) |
| 2017–2018 | → Girona (loan) | 47 | (1) |
| 2018–2022 | VfB Stuttgart | 8 | (0) |
| 2019–2020 | → Girona (loan) | 32 | (0) |
| 2020–2021 | → Huesca (loan) | 25 | (1) |
| 2021–2022 | → Mallorca (loan) | 35 | (1) |
| 2022–2026 | Mallorca | 118 | (4) |
| 2026– | Olympiacos | 0 | (0) |
| 2026– | → Valencia (loan) | 10 | (0) |

International career
| 2013 | Spain U16 | 1 | (0) |
| 2013–2014 | Spain U17 | 7 | (0) |
| 2016 | Spain U19 | 1 | (0) |
| 2017–2018 | Spain U21 | 5 | (0) |
- * Club domestic league appearances and goals as of 22:00, 1 November 2026 (UTC)

Pablo Carmine Maffeo Becerra (Spanish pronunciation: [ˈpaβlo maˈfeo]; born 12 July 1997) is a Spanish professional footballer who plays as a right-back for La Liga club Valencia, on loan from Super League Greece club Olympiacos.

== Club career ==
=== Early career ===
Born in Sant Joan Despí, Barcelona, Catalonia, Maffeo joined Espanyol's youth setup in 2003, from Levante Las Planas. On 7 April 2013, he made his senior debut for the reserves at the age of only 15, coming on as a late substitute in a 1–0 home win against Constància in the Segunda División B.

=== Manchester City ===
On 3 July 2013, Maffeo and compatriot Manu García moved abroad, agreeing to a contract with Manchester City. He was initially assigned to the under-18 team, progressing through the club's Elite Development squad.

Maffeo was called up by first-team manager Manuel Pellegrini for a match against Watford on 29 August 2015, but remained unused in the 2–0 home win. He would subsequently make the bench on a few more occasions, aside from appearing with the under-19s in UEFA Youth League.

Maffeo made his competitive debut for City 24 August 2016, starting in a 1–0 victory over Steaua București in the play-off round of the UEFA Champions League. His second start came two months later, in a 1–0 loss at Manchester United in the EFL Cup.

=== Girona ===
On 13 January 2016, after signing a new three-year contract with City, Maffeo joined Segunda División club Girona on loan until June. He made his professional debut on 7 February, replacing Borja García in a 1–1 home draw against Gimnàstic de Tarragona.

On 27 December 2016, it was announced Maffeo would rejoin Girona on loan until the end of the season. On 15 April 2017, he was sent off in stoppage time of the 3–3 away draw with Tenerife. He contributed one goal from 14 appearances in a first-ever promotion to La Liga.

Maffeo agreed to a third loan spell at the Estadi Montilivi on 31 July 2017. He made his debut in the competition on 19 August, starting in a 2–2 home draw against Atlético Madrid.

When Maffeo played against Barcelona, he man-marked Lionel Messi superbly. This prompted the latter to name the former as the toughest opponent that he had ever faced.

=== VfB Stuttgart ===
On 14 May 2018, Maffeo signed a five-year contract with VfB Stuttgart, with the deal being made effective on 1 July. His first appearance in the Bundesliga took place on 26 August, in a 1–0 away loss to Mainz 05 where he featured the full 90 minutes.

Maffeo was loaned back to Girona on 20 June 2019. On 8 September 2020, he joined Huesca also in a temporary deal but with an option to make the move permanent. He scored his first goal in the Spanish top division five days later, in the 1–1 draw at Villarreal.

=== Mallorca ===
On 7 July 2021, Maffeo joined Mallorca on a season-long loan. On 29 June 2022, he agreed to a permanent four-year contract.

Maffeo played 160 total games during his spell in the Balearic Islands, scoring five times and providing 15 assists. He was part of the squad that reached the final of the 2023–24 Copa del Rey, but suffered relegation at the end of the 2025–26 campaign.

=== Olympiacos ===
On 19 June 2026, Maffeo signed a three-year deal with Olympiacos. On 20 August, however, he moved to Valencia on a season-long loan with an option to buy.

== International career ==
Maffeo was a youth international for Spain. On 10 November 2023, he was called up by Argentina manager Lionel Scaloni for games against Uruguay and Brazil in the 2026 FIFA World Cup qualifiers, being eligible to play for the latter country through his mother.

== Personal life ==
Maffeo's younger brother, Víctor, is also a footballer and a defender. He is of Italian descent on his father's side and of Argentine descent on his mother's.

== Career statistics ==
As of match played 23 May 2026

| Club | Season | League | | | National cup | | League Cup | | Continental | | Other | | Total | |
| Club | Season | Division | Apps | Goals | Apps | Goals | Apps | Goals | Apps | Goals | Apps | Goals | Apps | Goals |
|---|---|---|---|---|---|---|---|---|---|---|---|---|---|---|
| Espanyol B | 2012–13 | Segunda División B | 1 | 0 | — | | — | | — | | — | | 1 | 0 |
| Manchester City | 2015–16 | Premier League | 0 | 0 | 0 | 0 | 0 | 0 | 0 | 0 | — | | 0 | 0 |
| Manchester City | 2016–17 | Premier League | 0 | 0 | 0 | 0 | 1 | 0 | 2 (Note: Appearances in UEFA Champions League) | 0 | — | | 3 | 0 |
| Girona (loan) | 2015–16 | Segunda División | 10 | 0 | 0 | 0 | — | | — | | — | | 10 | 0 |
| Girona (loan) | 2016–17 | Segunda División | 14 | 1 | 0 | 0 | — | | — | | — | | 14 | 1 |
| Girona (loan) | 2017–18 | La Liga | 33 | 0 | 1 | 0 | — | | — | | — | | 34 | 0 |
| VfB Stuttgart | 2018–19 | Bundesliga | 8 | 0 | 1 | 0 | — | | — | | — | | 9 | 0 |
| Girona (loan) | 2019–20 | Segunda División | 32 | 0 | 0 | 0 | — | | — | | 3 (Note: Appearances in La Liga play-offs) | 0 | 35 | 0 |
| Huesca (loan) | 2020–21 | La Liga | 25 | 1 | 0 | 0 | — | | — | | — | | 25 | 1 |
| Mallorca (loan) | 2021–22 | La Liga | 35 | 1 | 1 | 0 | — | | — | | — | | 36 | 1 |
| Mallorca | 2022–23 | La Liga | 35 | 2 | 2 | 0 | — | | — | | — | | 37 | 2 |
| Mallorca | 2023–24 | La Liga | 22 | 1 | 2 | 0 | — | | — | | — | | 24 | 1 |
| Mallorca | 2024–25 | La Liga | 30 | 0 | 0 | 0 | — | | — | | 1 (Note: Appearance in Supercopa de España) | 0 | 31 | 0 |
| Mallorca | 2025–26 | La Liga | 31 | 1 | 1 | 0 | — | | — | | — | | 32 | 1 |
| Mallorca | Total | | 153 | 5 | 6 | 0 | — | | — | | 1 | 0 | 160 | 5 |
| Career total | | | 276 | 7 | 8 | 0 | 1 | 0 | 2 | 0 | 4 | 0 | 291 | 7 |
