= Marc Muniesa =

Spanish footballer (born 1992)

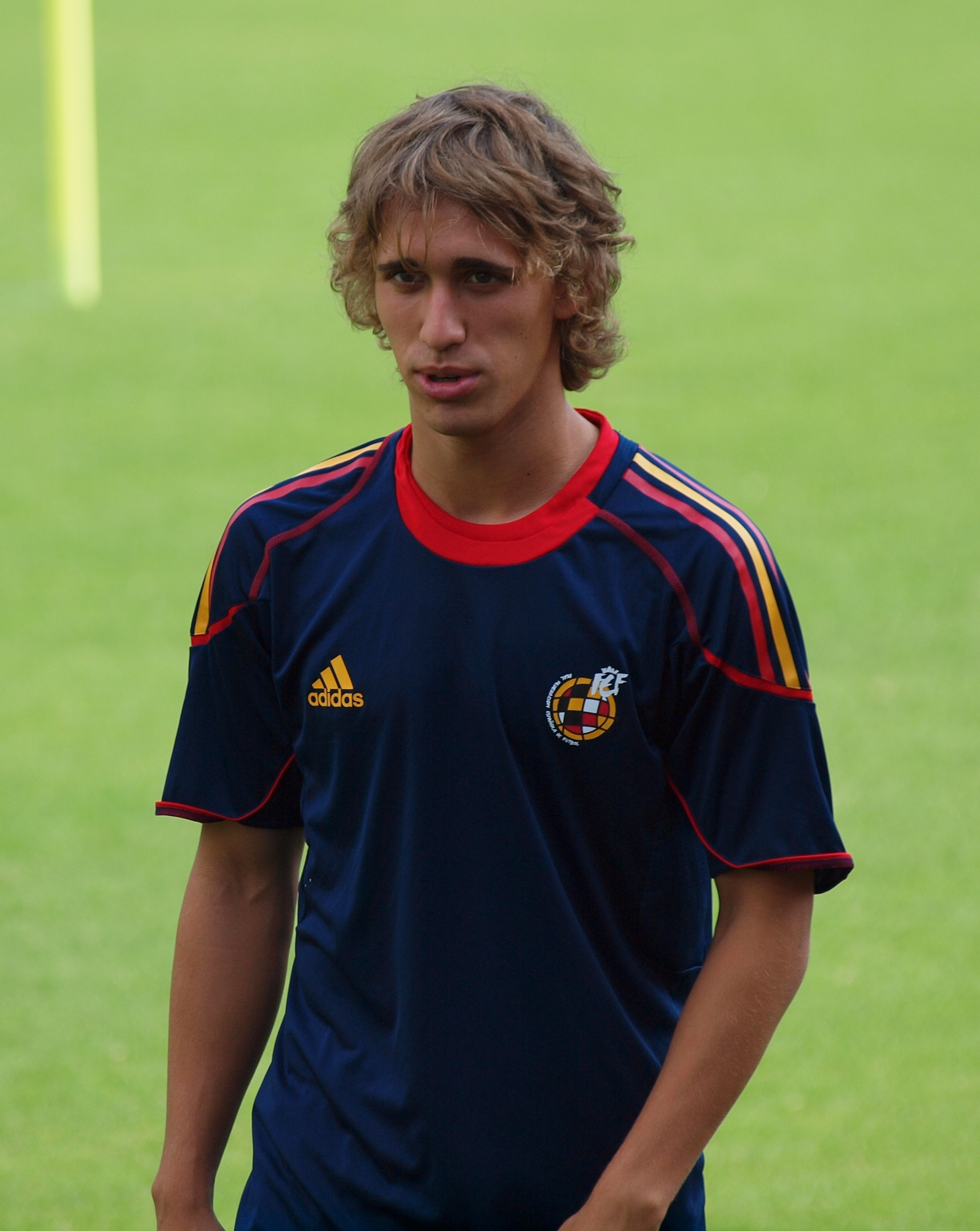
- Muniesa with the Spain U21s in 2010

Personal information
- Full name: Marc Muniesa Martínez
- Date of birth: 27 March 1992 (age 34)
- Place of birth: Lloret de Mar, Spain
- Height: 1.79 m (5 ft 10 in)
- Position: Centre-back

Team information
- Current team: Al Shahaniya
- Number: 5

Youth career
- 1996–2003: Lloret
- 2003–2009: Barcelona

Senior career*
Years	Team	Apps	(Gls)
2009–2013	Barcelona B	79	(4)
2009–2013	Barcelona	2	(0)
2013–2018	Stoke City	57	(1)
2017–2018	→ Girona (loan)	13	(0)
2018–2019	Girona	19	(0)
2019–2023	Al-Arabi	63	(1)
2023–2024	Lyngby	10	(0)
2024–	Al Shahaniya	31	(0)

International career
2008	Spain U16	2	(0)
2009	Spain U17	10	(0)
2010–2011	Spain U19	9	(0)
2011–2014	Spain U21	9	(0)
2011–	Catalonia	2	(0)
- * Club domestic league appearances and goals as of 10:08, 7 June 2026 (UTC)

Marc Muniesa Martínez (born 27 March 1992) is a Spanish professional footballer who plays mainly as a centre-back or left-back for Qatari Stars League club Al Shahaniya.

Muniesa began his career with Barcelona, making his debut at the end of the 2008–09 season at the age of 17. He then played for Barcelona B, helping them to win promotion to the Segunda División in 2009–10. He was on the verge of breaking into the first team in 2012–13, but suffered a torn knee ligament in pre-season and missed most of the season. In July 2013, he joined English side Stoke City on a free transfer. Four years later, he returned to La Liga with local side Girona, on a season-long loan. He made this move permanent in 2018 for €5 million but severed his contract a year later following their relegation, and joined Al-Arabi in Qatar.

Muniesa gained 26 caps for Spain at youth level, including five for the under-21 side with which he won the 2013 European Championship.

== Club career ==
=== Barcelona ===
Born in Lloret de Mar, Girona, Catalonia, Muniesa was the subject of transfer interest from Chelsea at the age of 15. He progressed through the La Masia youth academy, though shortly after turning 16 he suffered a serious injury to his left knee, tearing the internal, external and cruciate ligaments and missing ten months.

Muniesa made his debut for Barcelona's first team aged 17 years and 57 days on 23 May 2009, as a substitute in a 1–0 La Liga home loss to Osasuna, the already-crowned league champions. The appearance made him one of the youngest players to feature for the club, but he was sent off after a challenge on Antonio Hidalgo. Days later he was named among the substitutes, though he did not play, for the 2009 UEFA Champions League Final against Manchester United.

Muniesa and four other FC Barcelona B players were promoted to the first team for the 2009–10 pre-season, but he appeared almost exclusively for the B's in Segunda División B, contributing with 19 games and one goal as the team returned to Segunda División after 11 years. In 2010–11 Muniesa played 25 times for Barcelona B as they finished in 3rd position in Spain's second tier. In 2011–12 he made three substitute appearances for the first team, one in the league against Getafe and two in the UEFA Champions League, against BATE Borisov and Bayer Leverkusen; he added 24 matches with the reserves, helping them to the eighth position in the table.

On 15 February 2011, Muniesa signed a new contract with Barcelona, extending his link with the club by another year and raising his buyout clause to €30 million. On 4 April of the following year Barcelona announced that the player had signed an extension to his contract, also being promoted to the main squad for the 2012–13 season. On 24 July 2012, in Barcelona's first pre-season friendly, against Hamburger SV, Muniesa suffered a torn anterior cruciate ligament in his right knee, going on to miss six months. Prior to suffering his injury Muniesa was wanted on loan by Dutch club Ajax.

=== Stoke City ===
On 2 July 2013, Muniesa joined Premier League club Stoke City on a free transfer, signing a four-year contract. Following his move to England he stated – "I never imagined I would get the chance to play in the Premier League, but when Stoke called me I decided to come here with my family to speak to them. All the people I’ve spoken have shown a lot of confidence in me and I’m really happy that everything has been sorted. It wasn't a big decision for me to make. I came to England yesterday to meet the people at the club and look around the training ground, which is very impressive". He made his debut for Stoke in a 3–1 victory over Walsall in the League Cup on 31 August 2013. He made his first start in the Premier League on 30 November 2013 against Everton at Goodison Park. Muniesa played 17 times for the club in 2013–14 as Stoke finished the season in 9th position. Throughout the campaign manager Mark Hughes mainly used Muniesa as back-up to Erik Pieters.

Muniesa scored his first goals in English football on 23 September 2014, scoring both goals in a 2–1 League Cup third round victory over Sunderland. In December 2014, he began playing alongside Ryan Shawcross at centre-back due in place of the injured Marc Wilson. He helped Stoke keep back-to-back clean sheets in victories over Everton and West Bromwich Albion. Muniesa remained a regular in Mark Hughes' team before he suffered a hamstring injury in February 2015 which ruled him out for six weeks. He recovered to play in the final few matches of the season, in total he played 22 times for Stoke in 2014–15 as the Potters finished in 9th position for a second season running and they ended the campaign with an emphatic 6–1 victory against Liverpool.

On 7 August 2015, Muniesa signed a new contract with Stoke keeping him at the club until the summer of 2019. He had his attempt saved by Simon Mignolet as Stoke lost in a penalty shootout to Liverpool, missing out on the 2016 Football League Cup Final. His 2015–16 season was disrupted by injury, playing in 17 matches as Stoke again finished in 9th position.

After being a peripheral figure in 2016–17, Muniesa admitted that he might have to leave Stoke in order to gain regular football. He made his first start against Watford on 27 November where he helped Stoke earn a 1–0 victory. A week later against Burnley, Muniesa scored his first Premier League goal in a 2–0 win. Though he remained a peripheral figure at Stoke until the end of the 2016–17, making 11 appearances as Stoke finished in 13th position.

=== Girona ===
On 11 August 2017, Muniesa joined newly promoted La Liga club Girona on a season-long loan. Muniesa made 14 appearances for Girona in 2017–18 as the team finished in 10th position. He made his move to Girona permanent on 27 June 2018, for a fee later revealed to be €5 million.

On 19 August 2019, after suffering relegation, Muniesa terminated his contract with the club with two years remaining.

=== Al-Arabi ===
On the same day as leaving Girona, Muniesa signed with Al-Arabi of the Qatar Stars League after impressing against them in a friendly for his former club.

=== Lyngby ===
On 30 August 2023, Muniesa joined Danish Superliga side Lyngby Boldklub on a two-year deal. On 31 January 2024, Lyngby confirmed that Muniesa had had his contract terminated at his own request as the player wanted to return to Qatar, where his family resided.

=== Al Shahaniya ===
On 1 February 2024, Muniesa signed with Qatari Second Division club Al Shahaniya.

== International career ==
Muniesa played in all of Spain's youth teams from under-16s to under 21s. During that time he has been members of the squads which won the 2013 European Under-21 Championship and achieved a third-place finish at the 2009 FIFA U-17 World Cup.

== Style of play ==
Muniesa is a defender and has played at centre-back and left-back and can also play as a defensive midfielder but states that his preferred position is at centre-back. "My favourite position is central defender. I can also play at left back or in midfield but I feel better when I play centre back".

== Career statistics ==
As of match played 19 January 2024

Appearances and goals by club, season and competition
Club	Season	League			Cup		League Cup		Other		Total	
Club	Season	Division	Apps	Goals	Apps	Goals	Apps	Goals	Apps	Goals	Apps	Goals
Barcelona B	2009–10	Segunda División B	19	1	—		—		2 (Note: Appearances in 2010 Segunda División B play-offs)	0	21	1
Barcelona B	2010–11	Segunda División	25	2	—		—		—		25	2
Barcelona B	2011–12	Segunda División	24	1	—		—		—		24	1
Barcelona B	2012–13	Segunda División	11	0	—		—		—		11	0
Barcelona B	Total		79	4	—		—		2	0	81	4
Barcelona	2008–09	La Liga	1	0	0	0	—		0	0	1	0
Barcelona	2009–10	La Liga	0	0	0	0	—		0	0	0	0
Barcelona	2010–11	La Liga	0	0	0	0	—		0	0	0	0
Barcelona	2011–12	La Liga	1	0	0	0	—		2 (Note: Appearances in Champions League)	0	3	0
Barcelona	2012–13	La Liga	0	0	0	0	—		0	0	0	0
Barcelona	Total		2	0	0	0	—		2	0	4	0
Stoke City	2013–14	Premier League	13	0	1	0	3	0	—		17	0
Stoke City	2014–15	Premier League	19	0	1	0	2	2	—		22	2
Stoke City	2015–16	Premier League	15	0	0	0	2	0	—		17	0
Stoke City	2016–17	Premier League	10	1	0	0	1	0	—		11	1
Stoke City	Total		57	1	2	0	8	2	—		67	3
Stoke City U23	2016–17	—	—		—		—		3 (Note: Appearances in EFL Trophy)	0	3	0
Girona (loan)	2017–18	La Liga	13	0	1	0	—		—		14	0
Girona	2018–19	La Liga	19	0	5	0	—		—		24	0
Girona	Total		32	0	6	0	0	0	0	0	38	0
Al-Arabi	2019–20	Qatar Stars League	20	1	8	0	—		—		28	1
Al-Arabi	2020–21	Qatar Stars League	20	0	5	0	—		—		25	0
Al-Arabi	2021–22	Qatar Stars League	5	0	8	0	—		—		13	0
Al-Arabi	2022–23	Qatar Stars League	18	0	5	0	—		—		23	0
Al-Arabi	Total		63	1	26	0	0	0	0	0	73	1
Lyngby	2023–24	Danish Superliga	10	0	4	0	—		—		14	0
Career total			240	6	34	0	8	2	7	0	293	8

== Honours ==
Barcelona B

- Segunda División B play-off winner: 2009–10

Barcelona

- La Liga: 2008–09
- Supercopa de España: 2009, 2010
- UEFA Champions League: 2008–09
- UEFA Super Cup: 2009

Al Arabi SC

- Emir of Qatar Cup: 2023

Spain U17

- FIFA U-17 World Cup: Third place 2009

Spain U21

- UEFA European Under-21 Championship: 2013
