= Yassine Bounou =

Morocco professional footballer (born 1991)

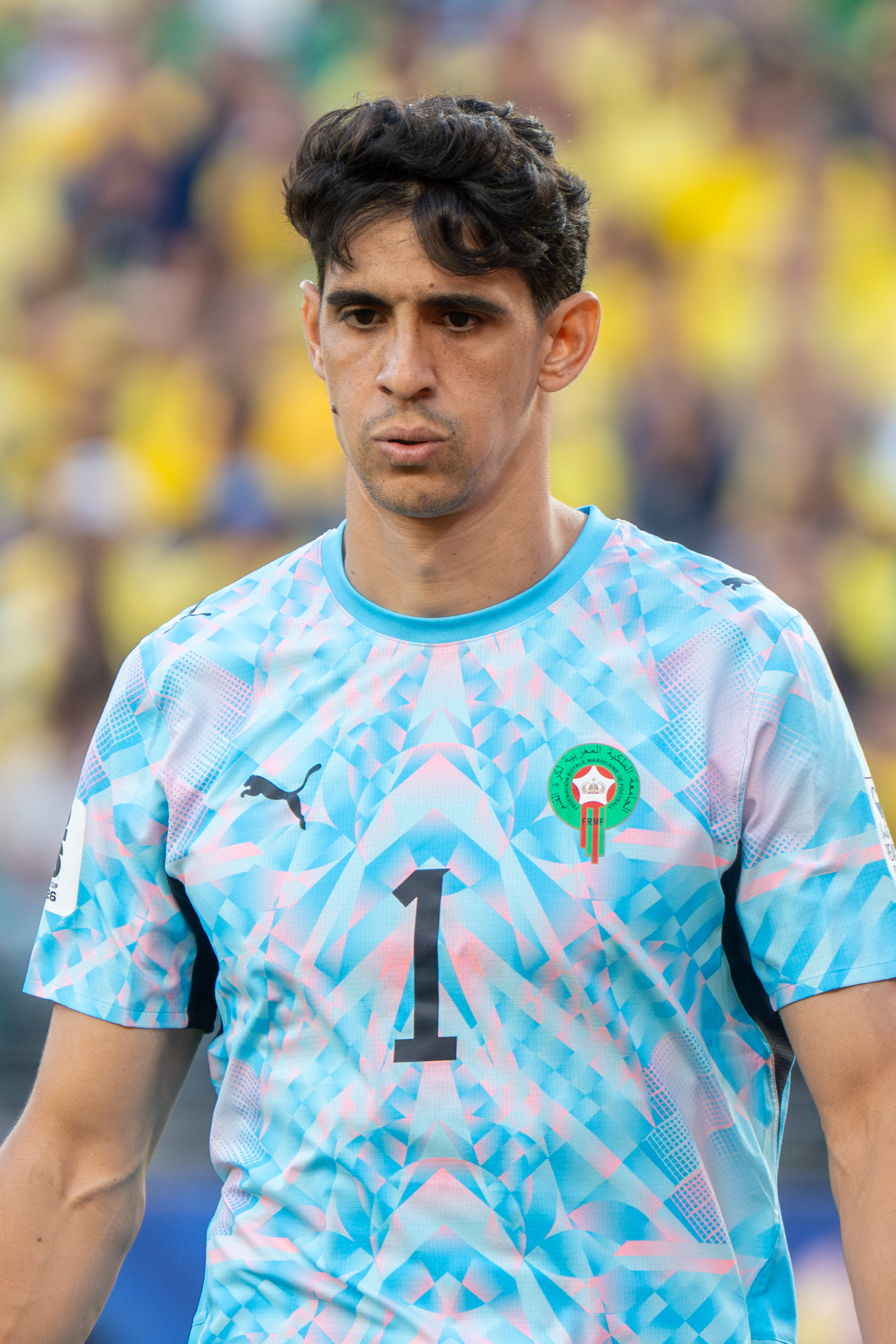
- Bounou with Morocco in 2026

Personal information
- Full name: Yassine Bounou
- Date of birth: 5 April 1991 (age 35)
- Place of birth: Montreal, Quebec, Canada
- Height: 1.92 m (6 ft 4 in)
- Position: Goalkeeper

Team information
- Current team: Al Hilal
- Number: 37

Youth career
- 1999–2010: Wydad Casablanca

Senior career*
Years	Team	Apps	(Gls)
2010–2012	Wydad Casablanca	8	(0)
2012–2014	Atlético Madrid B	47	(0)
2012–2016	Atlético Madrid	0	(0)
2014–2016	→ Zaragoza (loan)	35	(0)
2016–2020	Girona	83	(0)
2019–2020	→ Sevilla (loan)	6	(0)
2020–2023	Sevilla	90	(1)
2023–	Al Hilal	98	(0)

International career^{‡}
2011–2012	Morocco U20	4	(0)
2011–2012	Morocco Olympic	4	(0)
2013–	Morocco	100	(0)
Medal record
Men's football
Representing Morocco
Africa Cup of Nations
Winner	2025 Morocco
- * Club domestic league appearances and goals as of 31 October 2026 (UTC) ‡ National team caps and goals as of 13 November 2026 (UTC)

Yassine Bounou (Note: Arabic: ياسين بونو, romanized: Yāsīn Būnū, Berber languages: ⵢⴰⵙⵉⵏ ⴱⵓⵏⵓ) (born 5 April 1991), also known mononymously as Bono, is a Moroccan professional footballer who plays as a goalkeeper for Saudi Pro League club Al Hilal and the Morocco national team.

Bounou began his youth career in Morocco, playing for Wydad AC. He spent most of his senior career in Spain, making over 150 La Liga appearances, and over 50 in the Segunda División. During the 2021–22 season, he won the Zamora Trophy for the first time in the history of Sevilla. Bounou was ranked thirteenth for the 2023 Ballon d'Or and third for the 2023 Yashin Trophy. He also ranked in third place for The Best FIFA Goalkeeper in 2022 and 2023, and in second place for the IFFHS World's Best Goalkeeper in 2022. At international level, he reached the semi-finals with his national team in the 2022 FIFA World Cup.

Born in Canada to Moroccan parents, Bounou returned to Morocco at the age of two with his family. He has been a full international for Morocco since 2013. Having previously played for the under-23 team at the 2012 Olympics, he has represented his nation at three FIFA World Cup and five Africa Cup of Nations tournaments.

== Early life ==
Yassine Bounou was born in Montreal, Quebec to Moroccan parents. His father, originally from the village of Bouana, Tamedit commune, Taounate Province, is an engineer and former professor at the Hassania School of Public Works. Bounou and his parents returned to Morocco when he was three years old, settling in Casablanca. He began playing football as a child and joined Wydad AC at the age of 8 in 1999. He liked to play using his feet, but due to his height it was later suggested he become a goalkeeper, a challenge he accepted. His goalkeeper idol is Edwin van der Sar.

== Club career ==
=== Wydad AC ===
His parents initially had mixed feelings regarding their son spending so much time playing football, but they later became more supportive as his talent became more evident. At 17 years old, his goalkeeping skills were spotted by a scout from OGC Nice, and he signed with the club; however, due to bureaucratic problems he did not play for Nice and returned to Wydad AC. In 2011, he made his senior debut with the club, after having been promoted to the first team a year earlier.

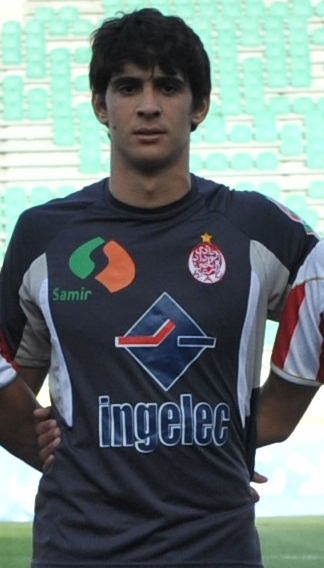
Bounou with Wydad AC in 2012

Bounou moved to the first team in 2010 at the age of nineteen as the second choice keeper, behind Nadir Lamyaghri. He started his first match with the Wydad AC first team in front of 80,000 supporters on the occasion of the final of the CAF Champions League against Espérance de Tunis.

On 21 November 2011, Bounou played his first Botola Pro match against Difaâ El Jadida. He took part in ten league matches, and then he moved to Atlético Madrid.

=== Atlético Madrid ===
On 14 June 2012, Bounou moved to La Liga club Atlético Madrid, where he was initially named to the second team the reserves in Segunda División B, and as a third goalkeeper with the first team. He signed a new four-year deal with the club on 31 May 2013. In the summer of 2014, after profiting from Thibaut Courtois and Daniel Aranzubia's departures, he was definitively promoted to the main squad. He made his first-team debut on 24 July 2014, in a 1–0 pre-season friendly win against Numancia.

==== Loan to Zaragoza ====
On 1 September 2014, Bounou was loaned to the Segunda División's Real Zaragoza, in a season-long deal. Kept out by Óscar Whalley for the first half of the campaign, he made his debut the following 11 January in a 5–3 loss at UD Las Palmas, and finished the season with 16 appearances. In the play-offs, after Whalley's performance led to a 0–3 home loss to Girona FC in the first leg, Bounou replaced him in the second for a 4–1 win and advancement on away goals; Zaragoza lost the final by the same rule to UD Las Palmas. On 23 July 2015, he returned to the Aragonese side, again in a one-year loan deal.

=== Girona ===
On 12 July 2016, Bounou signed a permanent two-year contract with fellow league team Girona. He played exactly half of games in his first season – sharing with René Román – as they were promoted in second place. In January 2019, now first choice at the top-flight club, he extended his contract until June 2021.

=== Sevilla ===
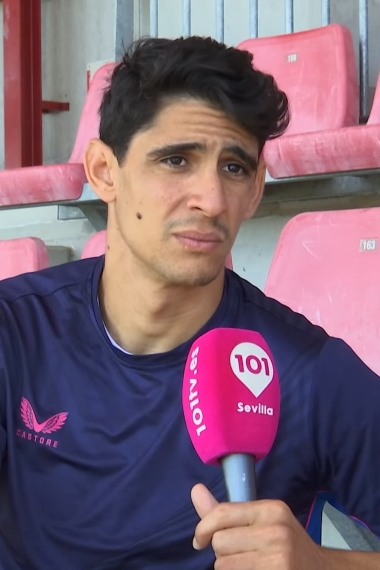
Bounou with Sevilla in 2023

On 2 September 2019, after suffering relegation with the Catalans, Bounou joined Sevilla in the top tier, on loan for one year. Second-choice to Tomáš Vaclík in the league season, he played regularly in the domestic cup and as the side won the 2019–20 UEFA Europa League, earning plaudits for his performance against Wolverhampton Wanderers in the quarter-finals as he saved a penalty from Raúl Jiménez to earn a 1–0 win, also in the 2–1 semi-final win over Manchester United, and eventually his decisive save of Romelu Lukaku's one-on-one strike, to win the final 3–2 against Inter Milan.

On 4 September 2020, Bounou signed a permanent four-year contract with the Andalusians. The following 21 March, in the last minute of a match against Real Valladolid, he scored his first goal as a professional goalkeeper to secure a 1–1 draw. In the calendar year 2021, Bounou kept 32 clean sheets in 59 games for club and country, the most for any goalkeeper in Europe's top five leagues (second place was Ederson of Manchester City and Brazil, with 30 in 59).

On 27 February 2022, Bounou assisted a goal by international teammate Munir El Haddadi in a 2–1 win over Real Betis in the Seville derby, his fourth goal contribution for Sevilla (three assists and a goal). In April, his contract was extended by one year to 2025. After claiming the La Liga Ricardo Zamora Trophy for 2021–22 (the first recipient playing for a club other than Real Madrid, Barcelona or Atlético Madrid since Roberto Abbondanzieri of Getafe in 2006–07), Bounou was nominated for The Best FIFA Men's Goalkeeper at the end of 2022 along with Emiliano Martínez and Thibaut Courtois, in which he eventually finished in second place.

On 31 May 2023, Bounou was named Player of the Match in the Europa League final against Roma, where he managed to save two penalty kicks in a 4–1 victory for Sevilla in the penalty shootout after a 1–1 draw, which secured their seventh title in the competition. He was among the final three nominees for the 2023 Best FIFA Men's Goalkeeper alongside Courtois again, and eventual winner Ederson.

=== Al-Hilal ===
On 17 August 2023, Bounou joined Riyadh-based side Al-Hilal on a three-year contract. In 2023, Bounou was nominated for the 2023 Ballon d'Or and The 2023 Best FIFA Football Awards. On 30 October 2023, Bounou was ranked 13th place in the 2023 Ballon d'Or and ranked 3rd in the 2023 Yashin Trophy. On 1 November 2023, Bounou was nominated for the 2023 African Footballer of the Year and 2023 African Goalkeeper of the Year by CAF. On 11 December 2023, Bounou won the best goalkeeper in Africa trophy at the CAF.

During the 2025 FIFA Club World Cup, he saved a late penalty from Federico Valverde in the opening match, maintaining a 1–1 draw against Real Madrid. In the competition's round of 16, he produced 10 saves including a crucial one-on-one stop against Savinho in a 4–3 victory after extra time over Manchester City, matching the record set by Thibaut Courtois in the same edition.

== International career ==
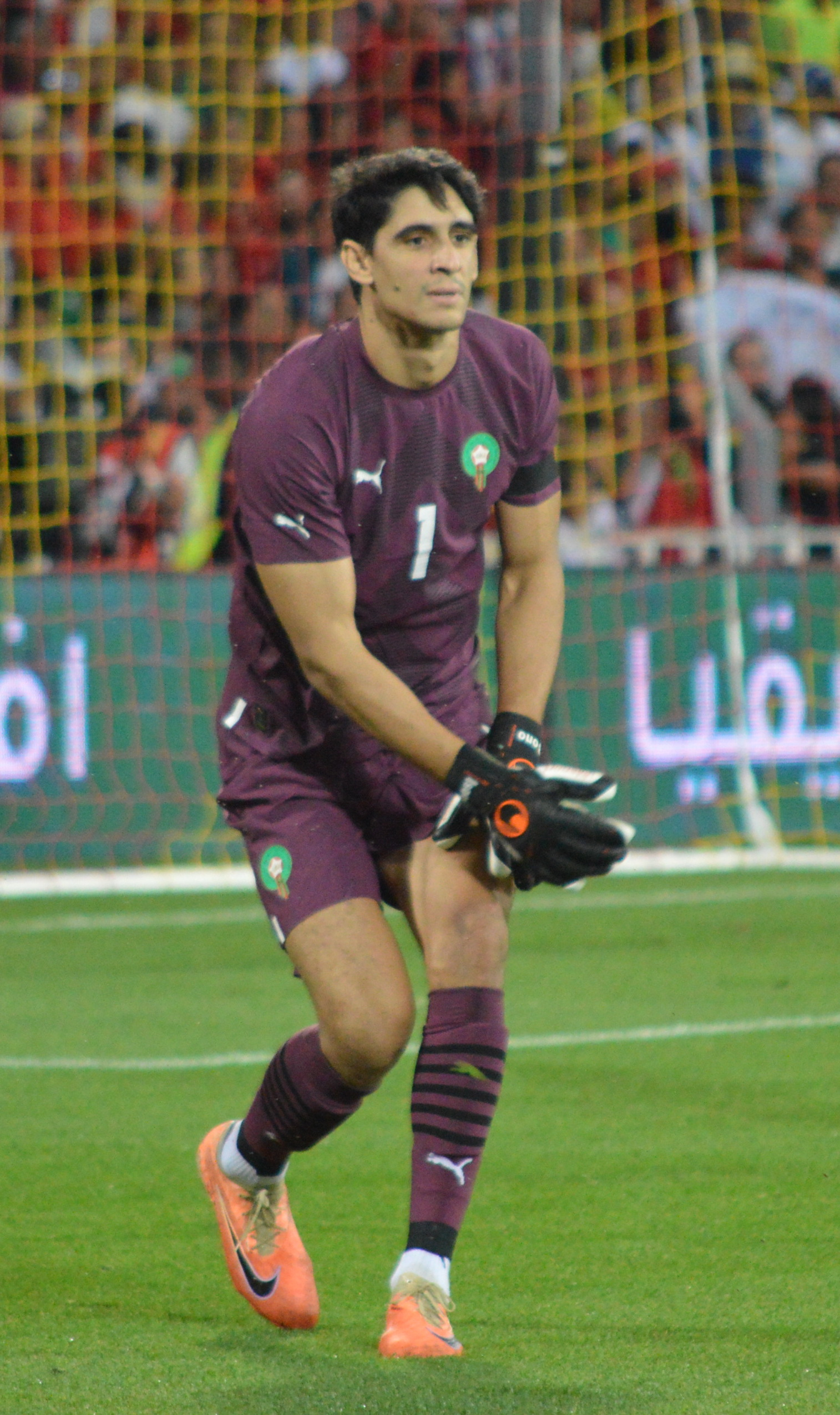
Bounou with Morocco in 2023

Bounou was eligible to represent Canada or Morocco, and opted to represent the latter, appearing with the under-20 team at the 2012 Toulon Tournament, playing in one match during the competition. He was also selected in the 18-man under-23 squad for the 2012 Summer Olympics, but acted as a backup to Mohamed Amsif during the tournament, in which Morocco were eliminated at the group stage.

In an interview, Bounou said that he had been contacted by the manager of the Canada national team, Benito Floro, but that this ultimately did not materialise. Moreover, he said to the interviewer that he grew up in Morocco, and deep down dreamed of representing the Moroccan national team.

On 14 August 2013, Bounou was called up to the main squad for a friendly match against Burkina Faso. He made his debut in the following day, playing the entire second half of an eventual 1–2 defeat in Tangier.

In May 2018, Bounou was named in Morocco's 23-man squad for the World Cup in Russia, where he served as reserve goalkeeper to Munir Mohamedi. At the 2019 Africa Cup of Nations in Egypt he was first choice for Hervé Renard's team, keeping clean sheets in 1–0 wins over Namibia and the Ivory Coast to qualify for the last 16.

Bounou was also called up for the 2021 Africa Cup of Nations in Cameroon. At the tournament, he made headlines for his defense of Arabic and refusal to speak to the press in French or English; a jab at the African Nations Cup for not having hired a single Arabic translator.

On 10 November 2022, Bounou was named in Morocco's 26-man squad for the 2022 FIFA World Cup in Qatar. He made two saves during the round of 16 penalty shoot-out against Spain, leading to Morocco qualifying for the quarter-finals for the first time in their history, where they won 1–0 against Portugal, becoming the first African team to reach the semi-finals. He kept four clean sheets, the most out of any goalkeeper in the tournament. He was the first African to reach three clean sheets at a World Cup.

On 28 December 2023, Bounou was amongst the 27 players selected by Walid Regragui to represent Morocco at the 2023 Africa Cup of Nations.

In October 2025, Bounou, with Morocco, broke the world record for the longest winning streak in international football, surpassing Spain's previous mark of 15 consecutive victories. With a 1–0 win over Congo in Rabat, Morocco extended their unbeaten run to 16 straight wins across all competitions, including World Cup qualifiers and friendlies. Their winning streak ultimately reached 19 consecutive wins before coming to an end during the 2025 AFCON with a 1–1 draw against Mali.

On 11 December 2025, Bounou was called up to the Morocco squad for the 2025 Africa Cup of Nations, hosted on home soil. Morocco eventually lost the 2025 AFCON final 1–0 against Senegal after extra time, but the result was overturned due to Senegal forfeiting the match after walking off to protest a referee decision. Bounou was named Best Goalkeeper in the tournament.

On 26 May 2026, Bounou was selected in the 26-man squad for the 2026 FIFA World Cup. During the Round of 32 match against the Netherlands, he saved the fifth penalty in the shootout from Crysencio Summerville, giving Morocco the chance to win the match, before Ismael Saibari converted the decisive penalty to secure Morocco's victory.

== Personal life ==
Bounou is a Muslim. He holds dual Morocco-Canadian nationality. He married Imane Khallad in 2016, and they welcomed a son named Isaac in 2020. Along with his national teammates, he donated his blood for those affected by the 2023 Marrakesh-Safi earthquake.

== Career statistics ==
=== Club ===
As of match played 19 October 2026

Appearances and goals by club, season and competition
Club	Season	League			National cup (Note: Includes Copa del Rey, King's Cup)		Continental		Other		Total	
Club	Season	Division	Apps	Goals	Apps	Goals	Apps	Goals	Apps	Goals	Apps	Goals
Wydad AC	2009–10	Botola	0	0	0	0	—		—		0	0
Wydad AC	2010–11	Botola	0	0	0	0	1 (Note: Appearance in CAF Champions League)	0	—		1	0
Wydad AC	2011–12	Botola	8	0	0	0	0	0	—		8	0
Wydad AC	Total		8	0	0	0	1	0	—		9	0
Atlético Madrid B	2012–13	Segunda División B	24	0	—		—		—		24	0
Atlético Madrid B	2013–14	Segunda División B	23	0	—		—		—		23	0
Atlético Madrid B	Total		47	0	—		—		—		47	0
Atlético Madrid	2013–14	La Liga	0	0	0	0	0	0	0	0	0	0
Zaragoza (loan)	2014–15	Segunda División	16	0	0	0	—		3 (Note: Appearances in La Liga play-offs)	0	19	0
Zaragoza (loan)	2015–16	Segunda División	19	0	0	0	—		—		19	0
Zaragoza (loan)	Total		35	0	0	0	—		3	0	38	0
Girona	2016–17	Segunda División	21	0	0	0	—		—		21	0
Girona	2017–18	La Liga	30	0	1	0	—		—		31	0
Girona	2018–19	La Liga	32	0	0	0	—		—		32	0
Girona	2019–20	Segunda División	0	0	—		—		—		0	0
Girona	Total		83	0	1	0	—		—		84	0
Sevilla (loan)	2019–20	La Liga	6	0	2	0	10 (Note: Appearances in UEFA Europa League)	0	—		18	0
Sevilla	2020–21	La Liga	33	1	6	0	5 (Note: Appearances in UEFA Champions League)	0	1 (Note: Appearance in UEFA Super Cup)	0	45	1
Sevilla	2021–22	La Liga	31	0	0	0	10 (Note: Six appearances in UEFA Champions League, four appearances in UEFA Europa League)	0	—		41	0
Sevilla	2022–23	La Liga	25	0	1	0	10 (Note: Four appearances in UEFA Champions League, six appearances in UEFA Europa League)	0	—		36	0
Sevilla	2023–24	La Liga	1	0	—		—		1	0	2	0
Sevilla	Sevilla total		96	1	9	0	35	0	2	0	142	1
Al Hilal	2023–24	Saudi Pro League	31	0	5	0	5 (Note: Appearances in AFC Champions League)	0	2 (Note: Appearances in Saudi Super Cup)	0	43	0
Al Hilal	2024–25	Saudi Pro League	31	0	1	0	10	0	7 (Note: Two appearances in Saudi Super Cup, five appearances in FIFA Club World Cup)	0	49	0
Al Hilal	2025–26	Saudi Pro League	26	0	5	0	5	0	—		36	0
Al Hilal	2026–27	Saudi Pro League	8	0	0	0	2	0	—		10	0
Al Hilal	Total		96	0	11	0	22	0	9	0	138	0
Career total			365	1	21	0	58	0	14	0	458	1

=== International ===
As of match played 13 November 2026

Appearances and goals by national team and year
National team	Year	Apps	Goals
Morocco	2013	1	0
Morocco	2014	3	0
Morocco	2015	1	0
Morocco	2016	2	0
Morocco	2017	2	0
Morocco	2018	4	0
Morocco	2019	10	0
Morocco	2020	3	0
Morocco	2021	8	0
Morocco	2022	18	0
Morocco	2023	6	0
Morocco	2024	13	0
Morocco	2025	12	0
Morocco	2026	17	0
Total		100	0

== Honours ==
Wydad AC

- Botola Pro: 2009–10
- CAF Champions League runner-up: 2011

Atlético Madrid

- La Liga: 2013–14
- Supercopa de España: 2014

Sevilla

- UEFA Europa League: 2019–20, 2022–23

Al-Hilal

- Saudi Pro League: 2023–24
- King's Cup: 2023–24, 2025–26
- Saudi Super Cup: 2023, 2024

Morocco

- Africa Cup of Nations: 2025

Individual

- La Liga Zamora Trophy: 2021–22
- La Liga Best African Player: 2021–22
- La Liga Team of the Season: 2021–22
- UEFA Europa League Team of the Season: 2019–20, 2022–23
- "Lion d'Or" African Footballer of the Year: 2023
- "Africa d'Or" African Footballer of the Year: 2023
- African Goalkeeper of the Year: 2023, 2025
- IFFHS Africa Team of The Year: 2022, 2023, 2025
- Saudi Super Cup Best goalkeeper: 2024
- Saudi Pro League Goalkeeper of the Season: 2023–24
- Saudi Pro League Goalkeeper of the Month: October 2023, November 2023, February 2024, January 2025, October 2025, May 2026, August 2026
- UMFP Best Moroccan goalkeeper abroad: 2021–22, 2022–23, 2023–24, 2024–25
- Joy Awards Sportsman of the Year: 2026
- Africa Cup of Nations Golden Glove: 2025
- Africa Cup of Nations Team of the Tournament: 2025

Orders

- Order of the Throne: 2022

== Notes ==
1. Arabic: ياسين بونو, romanized: Yāsīn Būnū, Berber languages: ⵢⴰⵙⵉⵏ ⴱⵓⵏⵓ
