= Douglas Luiz =

Brazilian footballer (born 1990)

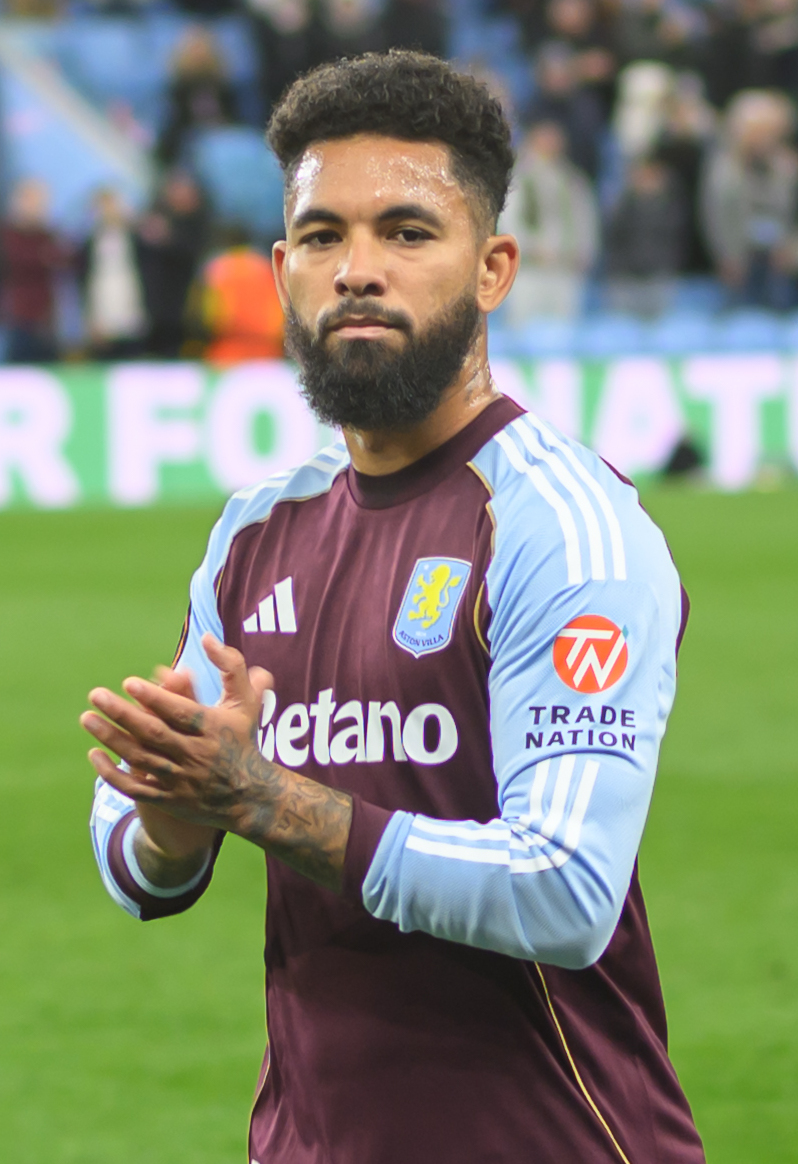
- Luiz playing for Aston Villa in 2026

Personal information
- Full name: Douglas Luiz Soares de Paulo
- Date of birth: 9 May 1998 (age 28)
- Place of birth: Rio de Janeiro, Brazil
- Height: 1.75 m (5 ft 9 in)
- Position: Central midfielder

Team information
- Current team: Juventus
- Number: 12

Youth career
- 2013–2016: Vasco da Gama

Senior career*
Years	Team	Apps	(Gls)
2016–2017	Vasco da Gama	35	(5)
2017–2019	Manchester City	0	(0)
2017–2019	→ Girona (loan)	38	(0)
2019–2024	Aston Villa	175	(20)
2024–	Juventus	31	(1)
2025–2026	→ Nottingham Forest (loan)	8	(0)
2026	→ Aston Villa (loan)	13	(1)

International career^{‡}
2016–2017	Brazil U20	7	(0)
2019–2021	Brazil U23	13	(2)
2019–	Brazil	18	(0)
Medal record
Men's football
Representing Brazil
Olympic Games
Gold medal – first place	2020 Tokyo	Team
Copa América
Runner-up	2021 Brazil
- * Club domestic league appearances and goals as of 18:33, 22 November 2026 (UTC) ‡ National team caps and goals as of 03:51, 7 July 2024 (UTC)

Douglas Luiz Soares de Paulo (born 9 May 1998), known as Douglas Luiz, is a Brazilian professional footballer who plays as a midfielder for Serie A club Juventus and the Brazil national team. He is an Olympic champion, winning gold in the 2020 Summer Olympics men's football final.

Douglas Luiz is a product of the Vasco da Gama academy; he was signed by Manchester City in 2017, but never played a competitive match during his time at the club, due to work permit difficulties, and was subsequently loaned out to La Liga side Girona twice. Aston Villa signed Luiz in July 2019 where he spent five seasons, ultimately helping the side qualify for the UEFA Champions League for the first time in over 40 years in 2024; he subsequently signed for Juventus.

== Club career ==
=== Vasco da Gama ===
Luiz was born in Rio de Janeiro and joined Vasco da Gama's youth setup in 2013, aged 14, after being approved in a number of tests held in Itaguaí. In July 2016, he was promoted to the first team by manager Jorginho due to Marcelo Mattos' injury.

Luiz made his first team debut on 27 August 2016, coming on as a second-half substitute for Fellype Gabriel in a 2–2 away draw against Tupi for the Campeonato Brasileiro Série B championship. In his first start three days later, he scored his team's only goal in a 2–1 loss at Vila Nova.

Luiz remained a starter for the Cruz-maltino until the end of the year, as his side achieved promotion to Campeonato Brasileiro Série A. In the meantime, he also extended his contract until 2019, on 26 September 2016.

Luiz made his debut in the main category of Brazilian football on 14 May 2017, starting in a 4–0 away loss against Palmeiras. His first goal in the division occurred on 10 June, as he netted his team's second in a 2–1 home win against Sport.

=== Manchester City ===
Luiz completed a move to Manchester City on 15 July 2017, signing a five-year contract.

==== Loan to Girona ====
On 1 August, he was loaned to La Liga side Girona for his first season with the club. Luiz made his debut for the Catalans on 26 August 2017, replacing Portu in a 1–0 home win against Málaga.

On 31 August 2018, Luiz was again loaned to Girona due to the UK Home Office denying him a work permit.

=== Aston Villa ===
Luiz signed for Aston Villa on 25 July 2019, subject to a work permit. His work permit was granted, and he officially became a Villa player on 7 August. On 17 August, Luiz scored his first goal for Villa against AFC Bournemouth in a 2–1 loss. In August 2022, Luiz scored directly from a corner in the third round of the 2022–23 EFL Cup against Bolton Wanderers, and repeated the feat the following week in a Premier League fixture against Arsenal.

In October 2022, after rumoured transfer interest from Arsenal, following the end of the transfer window – Luiz agreed a new "long-term" contract with Aston Villa. On 23 May 2023, Luiz was voted both Supporter's Player of the Season and Player's Player of the Season at the club's end of season awards. In the 2023–24 season, he managed to record ten goals and ten assists in 53 appearances in all competitions.

=== Juventus ===
On 30 June 2024, Luiz joined Serie A side Juventus for a €50 million fee, plus €1.5 million in add-ons, signing a five-year contract with the Italian club. As part of a separate transaction, Samuel Iling-Junior and Enzo Barrenechea joined Aston Villa on permanent deals. The transfer was in part attributed to Aston Villa's need to comply with Profit and Sustainability Rules (PSR), which forced them to sell one of their key players. His debut for the club came in a 3–0 victory over Como on 19 August 2024. A month later, on 17 September, he made his UEFA Champions League debut in a 3–1 victory over PSV Eindhoven.

==== Loan to Nottingham Forest ====
On 21 August 2025, Luiz joined Premier League side Nottingham Forest on loan for the remainder of the season with a conditional obligation to make the deal permanent. In September he was withdrawn injured at half-time of the 2–2 draw against Real Betis. He was declared unlikely to play until after the international break. On 1 November Luiz was substituted, fourteen minutes into the 2–2 draw against Manchester United, having indicated a problem with his hamstring. He missed the following five matches, returning as a second-half substitute during the 3–0 victory against Tottenham Hotspur on 14 December.

==== Loan return to Aston Villa ====
On 28 January 2026, Luiz rejoined Premier League side Aston Villa on loan for the remainder of the season to cover a midfield injury list of Kamara, Tielemans and McGinn.

The deal reportedly contained an option for Aston Villa to re-sign Luiz permanently at the end of the season for €25M. Luiz was part of the Aston Villa team that won their first silverware in 30 years, winning the 2026 UEFA Europa League final, however Aston Villa did not take up the option to re-sign Luiz permanently and he returned to Juventus at the end of the season.

== International career ==
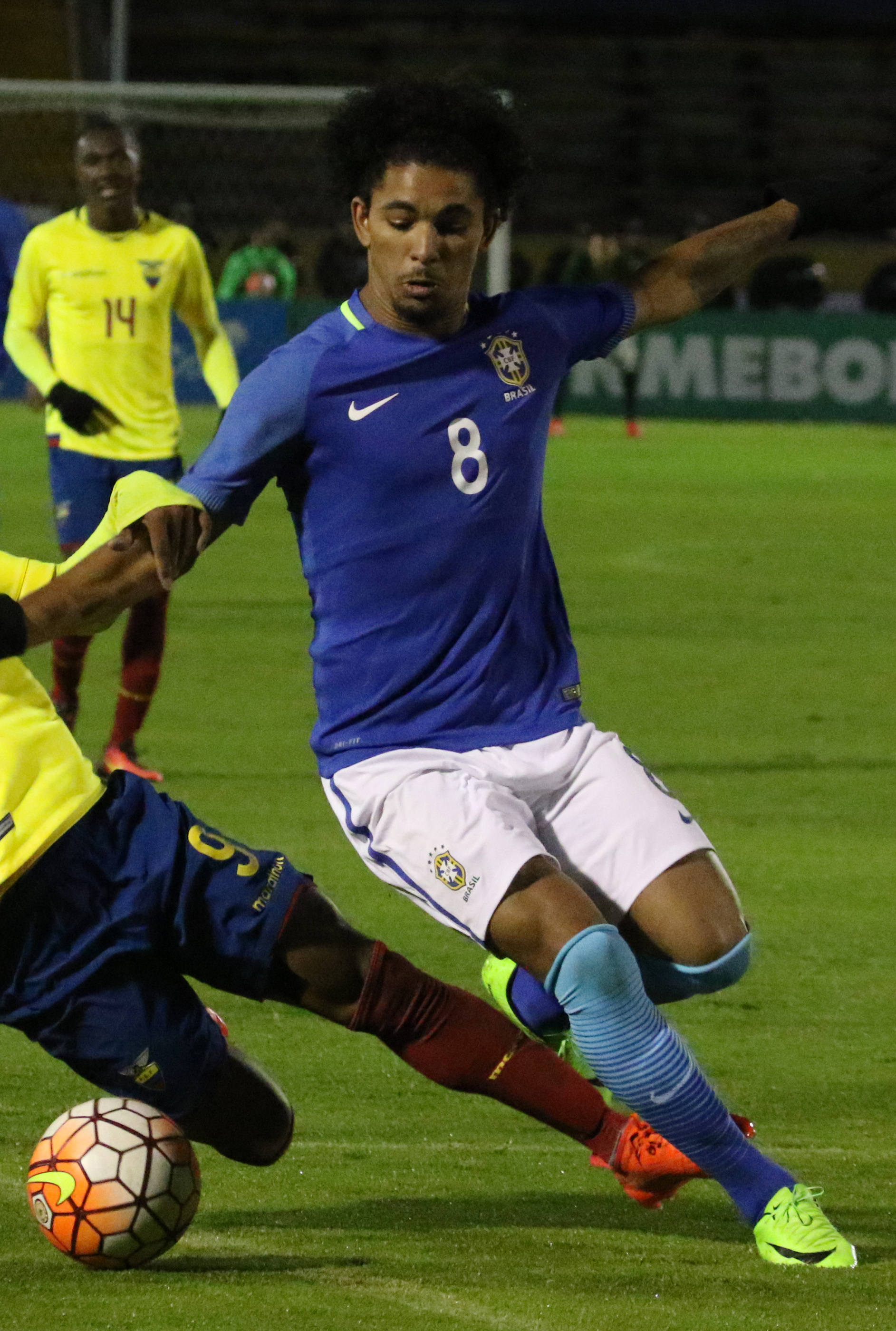
Luiz playing for Brazil U20 in 2017

Luiz appeared for Brazil at the youth level at the 2017 South American U-20 Championship and the 2019 Toulon Tournament, winning the latter.

On 19 November 2019, he made his senior international debut in a friendly match against South Korea, which Brazil won 3–0.

On 9 June 2021, Luiz was named to the Brazil squad for the 2021 Copa América. Brazil finished the tournament as runners-up to Argentina.

On 7 August 2021, Luiz won a gold medal as part of the Brazil football team at the 2020 Summer Olympics in Tokyo.

Luiz was called up for 2026 FIFA World Cup qualification matches against Colombia and Argentina on 16 and 21 November 2023, respectively.

In June 2024, Luiz was called up for the 2024 Copa America.

== Personal life ==
From 2021 to 2022, Luiz was in a relationship with Swiss forward Alisha Lehmann while they were both with Aston Villa; they reunited in 2024.

== Career statistics ==
=== Club ===
As of match played 22 November 2026

Appearances and goals by club, season and competition
Club	Season	League			National cup (Note: Includes Copa do Brasil, Copa del Rey, FA Cup)		League cup (Note: Includes EFL Cup)		Continental		Other		Total	
Club	Season	Division	Apps	Goals	Apps	Goals	Apps	Goals	Apps	Goals	Apps	Goals	Apps	Goals
Vasco da Gama	2016	Série B	14	2	1	0	—		—		0	0	15	2
Vasco da Gama	2017	Série A	11	1	3	0	—		—		10 (Note: Appearances in Campeonato Carioca)	2	24	3
Vasco da Gama	Total		25	3	4	0	—		—		10	2	39	5
Girona (loan)	2017–18	La Liga	15	0	2	0	—		—		—		17	0
Girona (loan)	2018–19	La Liga	23	0	6	0	—		—		—		29	0
Girona (loan)	Total		38	0	8	0	—		—		—		46	0
Aston Villa	2019–20	Premier League	36	3	0	0	6	0	—		—		42	3
Aston Villa	2020–21	Premier League	33	0	0	0	1	0	—		—		34	0
Aston Villa	2021–22	Premier League	34	2	1	0	0	0	—		—		35	2
Aston Villa	2022–23	Premier League	37	6	1	0	2	1	—		—		40	7
Aston Villa	2023–24	Premier League	35	9	3	0	1	0	14 (Note: Appearances in UEFA Europa Conference League)	1	—		53	10
Aston Villa	Total		175	20	5	0	10	1	14	1	—		204	22
Juventus	2024–25	Serie A	19	0	0	0	—		6 (Note: Appearances in UEFA Champions League)	0	2 (Note: One appearance in Supercoppa Italiana, one appearance in FIFA Club World Cup)	0	27	0
Juventus	2026–27	Serie A	12	1	0	0	—		4 (Note: Appearances in UEFA Europa League)	0	—		16	1
Juventus	Total		31	1	0	0	—		10	0	2	0	43	1
Nottingham Forest (loan)	2025–26	Premier League	8	0	1	0	1	0	4	0	—		14	0
Aston Villa (loan)	2025–26	Premier League	13	1	1	0	—		6	0	—		20	1
Career total			290	25	19	0	11	1	34	1	12	2	366	29

=== International ===
As of match played 6 July 2024

Appearances and goals by national team and year
National team	Year	Apps	Goals
Brazil	2019	1	0
Brazil	2020	4	0
Brazil	2021	4	0
Brazil	2022	0	0
Brazil	2023	2	0
Brazil	2024	7	0
Total		18	0

== Honours ==
Aston Villa

- UEFA Europa League: 2025–26
- EFL Cup runner-up: 2019–20

Brazil U23

- Olympic Gold Medal: 2020
- Toulon Tournament: 2019

Brazil

- Copa América runner-up: 2021

Individual

- Campeonato Carioca Team of the Year: 2017
- Toulon Tournament Best Player: 2019
- Toulon Tournament Best XI: 2019
- Aston Villa Supporter's Player of the Season: 2022–23
- Aston Villa Player's Player of the Season: 2022–23
