= Borja García (footballer, born November 1990) =

Spanish footballer

Personal information
- Full name: Borja García Freire
- Date of birth: 2 November 1990 (age 35)
- Place of birth: Torremocha, Spain
- Height: 1.75 m (5 ft 9 in)
- Position: Attacking midfielder

Youth career
- Villaverde Boetticher
- 2007–2009: Rayo Vallecano

Senior career*
Years	Team	Apps	(Gls)
2009–2010	Rayo Vallecano B	42	(10)
2009–2011	Rayo Vallecano	30	(3)
2011–2012	Córdoba	38	(17)
2012–2015	Real Madrid B	66	(11)
2014–2015	→ Córdoba (loan)	28	(1)
2015–2020	Girona	177	(17)
2020–2021	Huesca	21	(1)
2021–2024	Girona	38	(2)

International career
2008	Spain U19	2	(0)
- * Club domestic league appearances and goals as of 04:18, 10 March 2024 (UTC)

Borja García Freire (Spanish pronunciation: [ˈboɾxa ɣaɾˈθi.a]; born 2 November 1990) is a Spanish professional footballer who plays as an attacking midfielder.

== Club career ==
=== Rayo Vallecano ===
Born in Torremocha de Jarama, Community of Madrid, García joined local Rayo Vallecano at the age of 16, finishing his youth career there. On 20 June 2009, whilst still a junior, he made his debut as a professional, playing 11 minutes in a 2–2 home draw against Real Zaragoza in the Segunda División. In the 2009–10 season, additionally, he was a key figure for the reserves as they reached Segunda División B for the first time ever.

=== Córdoba ===
García stayed in the second division for 2011–12, signing with Córdoba. He scored 19 goals in 44 competitive matches during the campaign for the Andalusians, ranking fifth in the scoring charts.

=== Real Madrid B ===
In the summer of 2012, García joined another side in the second tier, Real Madrid Castilla. He played his 100th game at that level on 24 March 2013, against his former club Córdoba.

García returned to the Estadio Nuevo Arcángel on 7 August 2014, after agreeing to a one-year loan. He made his La Liga debut late in the month, playing the whole second half in a 1–1 home draw with Celta de Vigo.

García scored his first goal in the Spanish top flight on 21 September 2014, but in a 1–3 home loss against Sevilla.

=== Girona and Huesca ===
On 26 August 2015, García agreed to a two-year contract at Girona after his link to Real Madrid expired. On 15 September 2020, after five years as an undisputed starter for the Catalans, he moved to Huesca, newly promoted to the first division, on a three-year deal. The following 31 August, after the latter's relegation, he left as a free agent.

García returned to Girona in August 2021, on a two-year contract. He contributed two goals to their top-tier promotion, including one in the 2–0 away win over Eibar in the playoff semi-finals; subsequently, he was often sidelined due to injury.

On 2 July 2024, García left the Estadi Montilivi, having totalled 233 appearances in two spells.

== Career statistics ==
As of match played on 16 April 2023

Appearances and goals by club, season and competition
Club	Season	League			Cup		Continental		Other		Total	
Club	Season	Division	Apps	Goals	Apps	Goals	Apps	Goals	Apps	Goals	Apps	Goals
Rayo Vallecano	2008–09	Segunda División	1	0	0	0	—		—		1	0
Rayo Vallecano	2010–11	Segunda División	29	3	0	0	—		—		29	3
Rayo Vallecano	Total		30	3	0	0	0	0	0	0	30	3
Córdoba	2011–12	Segunda División	38	17	4	2	—		2 (Note: Appearance(s) in La Liga play-offs)	0	44	19
Real Madrid B	2012–13	Segunda División	41	9	0	0	—		—		41	9
Real Madrid B	2013–14	Segunda División	25	2	0	0	—		—		25	2
Real Madrid B	Total		66	11	0	0	0	0	0	0	66	11
Córdoba (loan)	2014–15	La Liga	28	1	1	0	—		—		29	1
Girona	2015–16	Segunda División	31	2	1	0	—		4	1	36	3
Girona	2016–17	Segunda División	39	7	1	0	—		—		40	7
Girona	2017–18	La Liga	37	2	1	0	—		—		38	2
Girona	2018–19	La Liga	33	1	4	0	—		—		37	1
Girona	2019–20	Segunda División	37	5	0	0	—		4	0	41	5
Girona	Total		177	17	7	0	0	0	8	1	192	18
Huesca	2020–21	La Liga	21	1	0	0	—		—		21	1
Girona	2021–22	Segunda División	27	1	2	0	—		1	1	30	2
Girona	2022–23	La Liga	11	1	0	0	—		—		11	1
Girona	2023–24	La Liga	0	0	0	0	—		—		0	0
Girona	Total		38	2	2	0	0	0	1	1	41	3
Career total			398	52	14	2	0	0	11	2	423	56
