= 2020–21 Real Valladolid season =

Real Valladolid
2020–21 season
- President: Ronaldo
- Head coach: Sergio González
- Stadium: José Zorrilla
- La Liga: 19th (relegated)
- Copa del Rey: Round of 16
- Top goalscorer: League: Fabián Orellana; Shon Weissman (6 each); All: Óscar Plano; Shon Weissman (7 each)
- Biggest win: Cantolagua 0–5 Valladolid
- Biggest defeat: Valladolid 0–3 Barcelona; Valencia 3–0 Valladolid; Real Sociedad 4–1 Valladolid
| Home colours | Away colours | Third colours |

The 2020–21 season was the 90th season in the existence of Real Valladolid and the club's third consecutive season in the top flight of Spanish football. In addition to the domestic league, Real Valladolid participated in this season's edition of the Copa del Rey. The season covered the period from 20 July 2020 to 30 June 2021, with the late start to the season due to the COVID-19 pandemic in Spain.

== Players ==
=== First-team squad ===
As of 1 February 2021.

Note: Flags indicate national team as defined under FIFA eligibility rules; some limited exceptions apply. Players may hold more than one non-FIFA nationality.

| No. | Pos. | Nation | Player |
|---|---|---|---|
| 1 | GK | ESP | Jordi Masip (vice-captain) |
| 2 | DF | ESP | Luis Pérez |
| 3 | FW | BIH | Kenan Kodro (on loan from Athletic Bilbao) |
| 4 | DF | ESP | Kiko Olivas |
| 5 | DF | ESP | Javi Sánchez |
| 6 | DF | ESP | Bruno González |
| 7 | FW | ESP | Sergi Guardiola |
| 8 | MF | ESP | Kike Pérez |
| 9 | FW | ISR | Shon Weissman |
| 10 | FW | ESP | Óscar Plano |
| 11 | MF | ESP | Pablo Hervías |
| 12 | MF | CHI | Fabián Orellana |
| 13 | GK | ESP | Roberto |
| 14 | MF | ESP | Rubén Alcaraz |

| No. | Pos. | Nation | Player |
|---|---|---|---|
| 15 | DF | MAR | Jawad El Yamiq |
| 16 | FW | BRA | Marcos André |
| 17 | MF | ESP | Roque Mesa |
| 18 | DF | SUI | Saidy Janko |
| 19 | MF | ESP | Toni Villa |
| 20 | MF | ESP | Fede San Emeterio |
| 21 | MF | ESP | Míchel (captain) |
| 22 | DF | ESP | Nacho (3rd captain) |
| 23 | FW | ESP | Waldo Rubio |
| 24 | DF | ESP | Joaquín |
| 25 | DF | URU | Lucas Olaza (on loan from Boca Juniors) |
| 40 | MF | POR | Jota (on loan from Benfica) |
| — | DF | ESP | Raúl García |

=== Reserve team ===
Note: Flags indicate national team as defined under FIFA eligibility rules; some limited exceptions apply. Players may hold more than one non-FIFA nationality.

| No. | Pos. | Nation | Player |
|---|---|---|---|
| 26 | GK | ESP | Samu Pérez |
| 27 | FW | ESP | Kuki Zalazar |
| 28 | DF | ESP | Ignasi Vilarrasa |
| 29 | MF | ESP | Oriol Rey |
| 30 | DF | ESP | Miguel Ángel (on loan from Getafe) |

| No. | Pos. | Nation | Player |
|---|---|---|---|
| 31 | GK | ESP | Gaizka Campos |
| 34 | DF | ESP | Sergio López (on loan from Real Madrid) |
| 41 | FW | ESP | Sergio Benito |
| 43 | DF | BRA | Lucas Freitas |

=== Out on loan ===
Note: Flags indicate national team as defined under FIFA eligibility rules; some limited exceptions apply. Players may hold more than one non-FIFA nationality.

| No. | Pos. | Nation | Player |
|---|---|---|---|
| — | GK | ESP | José Antonio Caro (at Ponferradina until 30 June 2021) |
| — | DF | ESP | Diego Alende (at Lugo until 30 June 2021) |
| — | DF | ESP | Moi Delgado (at Ponferradina until 30 June 2021) |
| — | DF | ESP | Roberto Corral (at Numancia until 30 June 2021) |
| — | MF | ESP | Álvaro Aguado (at Fuenlabrada until 30 June 2021) |
| — | MF | MAR | Anuar Tuhami (at APOEL until 30 May 2021) |

| No. | Pos. | Nation | Player |
|---|---|---|---|
| — | MF | ESP | Carlos Doncel (at Ponferradina until 30 June 2021) |
| — | MF | MTN | El Hacen (at Lugo until 30 June 2021) |
| — | MF | ESP | Víctor García (at Sabadell until 30 June 2021) |
| — | FW | ESP | Chris Ramos (at Lugo until 30 June 2021) |
| — | FW | ESP | Miguel de la Fuente (at Leganés until 30 June 2021) |
| — | FW | SEN | Sekou Gassama (at Fuenlabrada until 30 June 2021) |
| — | FW | ECU | Stiven Plaza (at Independiente until 31 December 2021) |

== Transfers ==
=== In ===
| Date | Player | From | Type | Fee | Ref |
|---|---|---|---|---|---|
| 21 July 2020 | (Spain) Álvaro Aguado | Numancia | Loan return | | |
| 21 July 2020 | (Brazil) Marcos André | Mirandés | Loan return | | |
| 21 July 2020 | (Mauritania) Hacen | Lugo | Loan return | | |
| 21 July 2020 | (Spain) Luismi | Oviedo | Loan return | | |
| 21 July 2020 | (Spain) Moi | Racing Santander | Loan return | | |
| 24 July 2020 | (Spain) Chris Ramos | Badajoz | Loan return | | |
| 4 August 2020 | (Chile) Fabián Orellana | Eibar | Transfer | Free | |
| 4 August 2020 | (Spain) Luis Pérez | Tenerife | Transfer | Free | |
| 8 August 2020 | (Senegal) Sekou Gassama | Fuenlabrada | Loan return | | |
| 8 August 2020 | (Spain) Javi Sánchez | Real Madrid | Buyout clause | €3M | |
| 11 August 2020 | (Spain) Bruno González | Levante | Transfer | Free | |

=== Out ===
| Date | Player | To | Type | Fee | Ref |
|---|---|---|---|---|---|
| 20 July 2020 | (Brazil) Matheus Fernandes | (Brazil) Palmeiras | Loan return | | |
| 20 July 2020 | (Spain) Raúl García | Getafe | Loan return | | |
| 20 July 2020 | (Spain) Pedro Porro | (England) Manchester City | Loan return | | |
| 20 July 2020 | (Spain) Sandro Ramírez | (England) Everton | Loan return | | |
| 20 July 2020 | (Turkey) Enes Ünal | Villarreal | Loan return | | |
| 6 August 2020 | (Spain) Víctor García | Sabadell | Loan | | |
| 8 August 2020 | (Ecuador) Stiven Plaza | (Turkey) Trabzonspor | Loan | €100K | |
| 12 August 2020 | (Ghana) Mohammed Salisu | (England) Southampton | Transfer | €12M | |
| 20 August 2020 | (Spain) Diego Alende | Lugo | Loan | | |
| 22 August 2020 | (Spain) José Antonio Caro | Ponferradina | Loan | | |

== Pre-season and friendlies ==
Win Draw Loss

| 23 August 2020 Friendly | Málaga | 1–0 | Valladolid | Marbella, Spain |
| 19:00 CEST (UTC+2) | Adrián 80' | Report | | Stadium: Marbella Football Center; Attendance: 0 Referee: Francisco Sáez Vital |

| 28 August 2020 Friendly | Granada | 0–3 | Valladolid | Marbella, Spain |
| 19:00 CEST (UTC+2) | | | Gassama 53'; Toni 59', 73' | Stadium: Marbella Football Center |

| 4 September 2020 Friendly | Sporting CP | 2–1 | Valladolid | Alverca do Ribatejo, Portugal |
| 20:00 WEST (UTC+1) | Feddal 71'; Cabral 78' | | Gassama 64' (pen.); Miguel Ángel (red card) 78' | Stadium: Complexo Desportivo FC Alverca |

| 5 September 2020 Friendly | Braga | 2–2 | Valladolid | Braga, Portugal |
| 19:00 WEST (UTC+1) | | | | Stadium: Estádio Municipal de Braga |

| 8 October 2020 XLVI Trofeo Ciudad de Valladolid | Valladolid | 2–2 (a.e.t.) (2–4 p) | Athletic Bilbao | Valladolid, Spain |
| 17:30 CEST (UTC+2) | Guardiola 79'; Kuki 88' | Report | Morcillo 42'; Zarraga 74' | Stadium: Estadio José Zorrilla; Attendance: 0 Referee: Fernando Román Román |
| | Penalties |
| | Rubio (penalty scored); Plano (penalty scored); Pérez (penalty missed); Kuki (penalty missed) | | (penalty scored) López; (penalty scored) Zarraga; (penalty scored) Vencedor; (penalty scored) Vicente |

== Competitions ==
=== Overall record ===
| Competition | First match | Last match | Starting round | Final position | Record | | | | | | | |
| Competition | First match | Last match | Starting round | Final position | Pld | W | D | L | GF | GA | GD | Win % |
|---|---|---|---|---|---|---|---|---|---|---|---|---|
| La Liga | 13 September 2020 | 22 May 2021 | Matchday 1 | 19th | 38 | 5 | 16 | 17 | 34 | 57 | −23 | 13.16 |
| Copa del Rey | 15 December 2020 | 26 January 2021 | First round | Round of 16 | 4 | 3 | 0 | 1 | 14 | 7 | +7 | 75.00 |
| Total | | | | | 42 | 8 | 16 | 18 | 48 | 64 | −16 | 19.05 |

Source: Soccerway

=== La Liga ===
==== League table ====
| Pos | Team | Pld | W | D | L | GF | GA | GD | Pts | Qualification or relegation |
|---|---|---|---|---|---|---|---|---|---|---|
| 16 | Alavés | 38 | 9 | 11 | 18 | 36 | 57 | −21 | 38 | |
| 17 | Elche | 38 | 8 | 12 | 18 | 34 | 55 | −21 | 36 | |
| 18 | Huesca (R) | 38 | 7 | 13 | 18 | 34 | 53 | −19 | 34 | Relegation to Segunda División |
| 19 | Valladolid (R) | 38 | 5 | 16 | 17 | 34 | 57 | −23 | 31 | Relegation to Segunda División |
| 20 | Eibar (R) | 38 | 6 | 12 | 20 | 29 | 52 | −23 | 30 | Relegation to Segunda División |

Source: La Liga
Rules for classification: 1) Points; 2) Head-to-head points; 3) Head-to-head goal difference; 4) Goal difference; 5) Goals scored; 6) Fair-play points (Note: Head-to-head record is used only after all the matches between the teams in question have been played)
(R) Relegated

==== Results summary ====
| Overall | | | | | | | | Home | | | | | | Away | | | | | |
| Pld | W | D | L | GF | GA | GD | Pts | W | D | L | GF | GA | GD | W | D | L | GF | GA | GD |
|---|---|---|---|---|---|---|---|---|---|---|---|---|---|---|---|---|---|---|---|
| 38 | 5 | 16 | 17 | 34 | 57 | −23 | 31 | 3 | 7 | 9 | 19 | 30 | −11 | 2 | 9 | 8 | 15 | 27 | −12 |

Source: La Liga

==== Results by round ====
| Round | 1 | 2 | 3 | 4 | 5 | 6 | 7 | 8 | 9 | 10 | 11 | 12 | 13 | 14 | 15 | 16 | 17 | 18 | 19 | 20 | 21 | 22 | 23 | 24 | 25 | 26 | 27 | 28 | 29 | 30 | 31 | 32 | 33 | 34 | 35 | 36 | 37 | 38 |
|---|---|---|---|---|---|---|---|---|---|---|---|---|---|---|---|---|---|---|---|---|---|---|---|---|---|---|---|---|---|---|---|---|---|---|---|---|---|---|
| Ground | H | A | H | A | H | A | H | A | H | A | H | A | H | A | H | A | A | H | H | A | H | A | A | H | A | H | A | H | A | H | A | H | A | H | A | H | A | H |
| Result | D | L | D | L | L | D | L | L | W | W | D | L | W | D | L | D | W | L | D | D | L | L | D | L | D | W | D | D | L | L | D | D | D | D | L | L | L | L |
| Position | 7 | 12 | 16 | 18 | 20 | 19 | 20 | 20 | 19 | 17 | 17 | 19 | 17 | 18 | 18 | 18 | 15 | 17 | 16 | 16 | 16 | 18 | 18 | 19 | 17 | 16 | 16 | 16 | 16 | 17 | 17 | 18 | 17 | 17 | 17 | 18 | 19 | 19 |

Source: La Liga
A = Away; H = Home; W = Win; D = Draw; L = Loss

==== Matches ====
The league fixtures were announced on 31 August 2020.

| 13 September 2020 1 | Valladolid | 1–1 | Real Sociedad | Valladolid |
| 16:00 CEST (UTC+2) | Míchel 39', (yellow card) 44'; Nacho (yellow card) 51'; Rubio (yellow card) 65'; Joaquín (yellow card) 69' | Report | López 60'; Elustondo (yellow card) 62' | Stadium: José Zorrilla; Attendance: 0 (Note: The match was played behind closed doors due to the COVID-19 pandemic in Spain.); Referee: Mario Melero López |

| 20 September 2020 2 | Real Betis | 2–0 | Valladolid | Seville |
| 18:30 CEST (UTC+2) | Fekir 10' (pen.), (yellow card) 30'; Carvalho 18'; Emerson (yellow card) 58'; Rodríguez (yellow card) 58' | Report | | Stadium: Benito Villamarín; Attendance: 0 Referee: Santiago Jaime Latre |

| 27 September 2020 3 | Valladolid | 1–1 | Celta Vigo | Valladolid |
| 18:30 CEST (UTC+2) | Guardiola (yellow card) 61', (goal) 66' (pen.); Bruno (yellow card) 80'; Sánchez (yellow card) 86' | Report | Mor (yellow card) 25'; Beltrán (yellow card) 41'; Aspas 44', (yellow card) 90+2'; Mallo (yellow card) 65' | Stadium: Estadio José Zorrilla; Attendance: 0 Referee: José María Sánchez Martínez |

| 30 September 2020 4 | Real Madrid | 1–0 | Valladolid | Madrid |
| 21:30 CEST (UTC+2) | Vinícius 65'; Casemiro (yellow card) 78'; Marcelo (yellow card) 90+3' | Report | Bruno (yellow card) 71' | Stadium: Alfredo Di Stéfano; Attendance: 0 Referee: César Soto Grado |

| 3 October 2020 5 | Valladolid | 1–2 | Eibar | Valladolid |
| 13:00 CEST (UTC+2) | Fede (yellow card) 23'; El Yamiq (yellow card) 31'; Toni 37'; Guardiola (penalty missed) 48' | Report | Burgos 29' (pen.), (yellow card) 59'; Zubikarai (yellow card) 55'; Diop (red card) 73'; Rodrigues 90'; Correa (yellow card) 90+6' | Stadium: Estadio José Zorrilla; Attendance: 0 Referee: Isidro Díaz de Mera Escuderos |

| 18 October 2020 6 | Huesca | 2–2 | Valladolid | Huesca |
| 18:30 CEST (UTC+2) | Mir 53'; Sandro 56'; Maffeo (yellow card) 73' | Report | Bruno (yellow card) 12', (goal) 35'; Rubio 51' (pen.); Joaquín (yellow card) 89' | Stadium: Estadio El Alcoraz; Attendance: 0 Referee: Jorge Figueroa Vázquez |

| 25 October 2020 7 | Valladolid | 0–2 | Alavés | Valladolid |
| 14:00 CET (UTC+1) | Nacho (red card) 21'; Toni (yellow card) 43' | Report | Pérez (penalty missed) 22'; Pina 55'; Sainz 85' | Stadium: Estadio José Zorrilla; Attendance: 0 Referee: José Luis Munuera Montero |

| 2 November 2020 8 | Villarreal | 2–0 | Valladolid | Villarreal |
| 21:00 CET (UTC+1) | Chukwueze 21'; Torres 37'; Mario (yellow card) 90+1' | Report | Joaquín (yellow card) 34'; Alcaraz (yellow card) 52'; García (yellow card) 71' | Stadium: Estadio de la Cerámica; Attendance: 0 Referee: Javier Alberola Rojas |

| 8 November 2020 9 | Valladolid | 2–1 | Athletic Bilbao | Valladolid |
| 18:30 CET (UTC+1) | Orellana 19' (pen.); Hervías (yellow card) 38'; Marcos André 48'; Alcaraz (yellow card) 66'; Masip (yellow card) 71'; García (yellow card) 90+1' | Report | Simón (yellow card) 17'; Muniain (yellow card) 66'; Williams 86' (pen.) | Stadium: Estadio José Zorrilla; Attendance: 0 Referee: César Soto Grado |

| 22 November 2020 10 | Granada | 1–3 | Valladolid | Granada |
| 18:30 CET (UTC+1) | Gonalons (yellow card) 37'; Neva (yellow card) 39'; Duarte 63'; Montoro (yellow card) 71'; Suárez (yellow card) 90+3' | Report | Fede (yellow card) 45'; Plano 45+2'; Marcos André 53'; Janko (yellow card) 69'; Jota (yellow card) 88', (goal) 90' | Stadium: Nuevo Los Cármenes; Attendance: 0 Referee: David Medié Jiménez |

| 27 November 2020 11 | Valladolid | 1–1 | Levante | Valladolid |
| 21:00 CET (UTC+1) | Marcos André 57' | Report | Postigo (yellow card) 32'; Melero (yellow card) 40'; Gómez (yellow card) 74'; Campaña 83' (pen.) | Stadium: Estadio José Zorrilla; Attendance: 0 Referee: Valentín Pizarro Gómez |

| 5 December 2020 12 | Atlético Madrid | 2–0 | Valladolid | Madrid |
| 18:30 CET (UTC+1) | Savić (yellow card) 24'; Vitolo (yellow card) 40'; Suárez (yellow card) 49'; Lemar 56'; Llorente 72'; Herrera (yellow card) 85' | Report | Sánchez (yellow card) 51'; Mesa (yellow card) 81' | Stadium: Wanda Metropolitano; Attendance: 0 Referee: Pablo González Fuertes |

| 11 December 2020 13 | Valladolid | 3–2 | Osasuna | Valladolid |
| 21:00 CET (UTC+1) | Weissman 7', 76', (yellow card) 84'; Mesa (yellow card) 24'; Alcaraz (yellow card) 45'; Orellana 56' (pen.); Pérez (yellow card) 90+5' | Report | Aridane (yellow card) 12'; Budimir 27', (yellow card) 80'; Torres 43'; Moncayola (yellow card) 66'; Vidal (yellow card) 71'; Calleri (yellow card) 82' | Stadium: Estadio José Zorrilla; Attendance: 0 Referee: Adrián Cordero Vega |

| 19 December 2020 14 | Sevilla | 1–1 | Valladolid | Seville |
| 21:00 CET (UTC+1) | Ocampos 31' (pen.), (yellow card) 59'; Gudelj (yellow card) 85'; De Jong (yellow card) 88' | Report | Bruno (yellow card) 8'; Fede (yellow card) 30'; Orellana (yellow card) 43'; Marcos André (yellow card) 73'; García 87' | Stadium: Ramón Sánchez Pizjuán; Attendance: 0 Referee: Jesús Gil Manzano |

| 22 December 2020 15 | Valladolid | 0–3 | Barcelona | Valladolid |
| 22:00 CET (UTC+1) | Joaquín (yellow card) 77' | Report | Lenglet 21'; Braithwaite 35'; Alba (yellow card) 62'; Messi 65'; De Jong (yellow card) 68' | Stadium: José Zorrilla; Attendance: 0 Referee: Mario Melero López |

| 29 December 2020 16 | Cádiz | 0–0 | Valladolid | Cádiz |
| 21:30 CET (UTC+1) | Fali (yellow card) 26'; Alejo (yellow card) 27'; Lozano (yellow card) 33' | Report | Mesa (yellow card) 6'; El Yamiq (yellow card) 45' | Stadium: Ramón de Carranza; Attendance: 0 Referee: Alejandro Hernández Hernández |

| 2 January 2021 17 | Getafe | 0–1 | Valladolid | Getafe |
| 18:30 CET (UTC+1) | Djené (yellow card) 59'; Cabaco (yellow card) 71'; Suárez (yellow card) 73' | Report | Weissman 37'; Pérez (yellow card) 85'; Alcaraz (yellow card) 87' | Stadium: Coliseum Alfonso Pérez; Attendance: 0 Referee: Isidro Díaz de Mera Escuderos |

| 10 January 2021 18 | Valladolid | 0–1 | Valencia | Valladolid |
| 21:00 CET (UTC+1) | Bruno (yellow card) 23'; Orellana (yellow card) 86' | Report | Soler (yellow card) 58', (goal) 76'; Diakhaby (yellow card) 82'; Correia (yellow card) 90+5' | Stadium: José Zorrilla; Attendance: 0 Referee: Guillermo Cuadra Fernández |

| 19 January 2021 19 | Valladolid | 2–2 | Elche | Valladolid |
| 19:00 CET (UTC+1) | Fede (yellow card) 39'; Míchel 71'; Joaquín 89'; Mesa (red card) 90+1' | Report | Josan 9', 43'; Josema (yellow card) 51'; Cifu (yellow card) 85'; Milla (yellow card) 90+4' | Stadium: José Zorrilla; Attendance: 0 Referee: Santiago Jaime Latre |

| 22 January 2021 20 | Levante | 2–2 | Valladolid | Valencia |
| 21:00 CET (UTC+1) | Gómez 62'; Roger 83' | Report | Toni (yellow card) 28'; Alcaraz 73'; Plano 78' | Stadium: Ciutat de València; Attendance: 0 Referee: José Luis Munuera Montero |

| 29 January 2021 21 | Valladolid | 1–3 | Huesca | Valladolid |
| 21:00 CET (UTC+1) | Míchel (yellow card) 33'; Nacho (yellow card) 64'; Toni 90+3' | Report | Silva (yellow card) 23'; Doumbia (yellow card) 30'; Mir 37', 50', 57' | Stadium: José Zorrilla; Attendance: 0 Referee: Juan Martínez Munuera |

| 5 February 2021 22 | Alavés | 1–0 | Valladolid | Vitoria-Gasteiz |
| 21:00 CET (UTC+1) | Pina (yellow card) 10'; Navarro (yellow card) 40'; García (yellow card) 63'; Joselu 66'; Méndez (yellow card) 90+2' | Report | Bruno (yellow card) 43'; Joaquín (yellow card) 48'; San Emeterio (yellow card) 82'; Alcaraz (yellow card) 88' | Stadium: Mendizorrotza; Attendance: 0 Referee: César Soto Grado |

| 13 February 2021 23 | Eibar | 1–1 | Valladolid | Eibar |
| 18:30 CET (UTC+1) | Kike 23'; Rafa (yellow card) 39'; Pozo (yellow card) 63' | Report | Mesa 7' (pen.); Pérez (yellow card) 79'; Olaza (yellow card) 85'; Orellana (yellow card) 90+3' | Stadium: Ipurua; Attendance: 0 Referee: Isidro Díaz De Mera Escuderos |

| 20 February 2021 24 | Valladolid | 0–1 | Real Madrid | Valladolid |
| 21:00 CET (UTC+1) | Alcaraz (yellow card) 60'; Nacho (yellow card) 71'; Orellana (yellow card) 77'; Plano (yellow card) 85' | Report | Casemiro 65'; Vázquez (yellow card) 69'; Arribas (yellow card) 78' | Stadium: José Zorrilla; Attendance: 0 Referee: Guillermo Cuadra Fernández |

| 28 February 2021 25 | Celta Vigo | 1–1 | Valladolid | Vigo |
| 14:00 CET (UTC+1) | Tapia (yellow card) 34'; Aidoo (yellow card) 90+3'; Murillo 90+4'; Ferreyra (yellow card) 90+5' | Report | Weissman (yellow card) 4'; Guardiola (yellow card) 40'; Olaza (yellow card) 58'; Orellana 70'; Joaquín (yellow card) 90'; El Yamiq (yellow card) 90+1' | Stadium: Balaídos; Attendance: 0 Referee: David Medié Jiménez |

| 6 March 2021 26 | Valladolid | 2–1 | Getafe | Valladolid |
| 14:00 CET (UTC+1) | Plano 14'; Weissman 24'; Alcaraz (yellow card) 56'; San Emeterio (yellow card) 80' | Report | Mata 37', (red card) 85'; Kubo (yellow card) 54'; Nyom (yellow card) 57' | Stadium: José Zorrilla; Attendance: 0 Referee: Mario Melero López |

| 13 March 2021 27 | Osasuna | 0–0 | Valladolid | Pamplona |
| 18:30 CET (UTC+1) | Barja (yellow card) 24'; Moncayola (yellow card) 84' | Report | Guardiola (yellow card) 21'; Joaquín (yellow card) 34'; Weissman (yellow card) 56' | Stadium: El Sadar; Attendance: 0 Referee: Ricardo de Burgos Bengoetxea |

| 20 March 2021 28 | Valladolid | 1–1 | Sevilla | Valladolid |
| 21:00 CET (UTC+1) | Orellana 44' (pen.), (yellow card) 64'; Mesa (yellow card) 52'; Olaza (yellow card) 52' | Report | Bono 90+4', (yellow card) 90+5' | Stadium: José Zorrilla; Attendance: 0 Referee: Xavier Estrada Fernández |

| 5 April 2021 29 | Barcelona | 1–0 | Valladolid | Barcelona |
| 21:00 CEST (UTC+2) | Griezmann (yellow card) 28'; Mingueza (yellow card) 43'; Braithwaite (yellow card) 84'; Dembélé 90' | Report | Bruno (yellow card) 40'; Guardiola (yellow card) 73'; Plano (red card) 79'; Masip (yellow card) 80' | Stadium: Camp Nou; Attendance: 0 Referee: Santiago Jaime Latre |

| 11 April 2021 30 | Valladolid | 1–2 | Granada | Valladolid |
| 18:30 CEST (UTC+2) | Orellana 41' (pen.); Alcaraz (yellow card) 62'; Janko (yellow card) 62'; Masip (yellow card) 64'; Bruno (yellow card) 69' | Report | Vallejo (yellow card) 34'; Suárez (yellow card) 67'; Molina 78'; Quini 86' | Stadium: José Zorrilla; Attendance: 0 Referee: Carlos del Cerro Grande |

| 21 April 2021 31 | Elche | 1–1 | Valladolid | Elche |
| 21:00 CEST (UTC+2) | Fidel 22'; Milla (yellow card) 26'; Marcone (yellow card) 37'; Calvo (yellow card) 72'; Gonzalo (yellow card) 84'; Rigoni (yellow card) 90+2' | Report | Kodro (yellow card) 12'; Joaquín (yellow card) 52'; Janko (yellow card) 67'; Olaza 86' | Stadium: Martínez Valero; Attendance: 0 Referee: José María Sánchez Martínez |

| 24 April 2021 32 | Valladolid | 1–1 | Cádiz | Valladolid |
| 16:15 CEST (UTC+2) | Plano 14'; Alcaraz (yellow card) 81' | Report | Espino (yellow card) 27'; Fali (yellow card) 60'; Cala 64'; Alejo (yellow card) 83' | Stadium: José Zorrilla; Attendance: 0 Referee: Javier Alberola Rojas |

| 28 April 2021 33 | Athletic Bilbao | 2–2 | Valladolid | Bilbao |
| 19:00 CEST (UTC+2) | Morcillo 14'; Sancet (yellow card) 61'; R. García 76' | Report | Orellana 70'; Weissman 85'; El Yamiq (yellow card) 90+1' | Stadium: San Mamés; Attendance: 0 Referee: Adrián Cordero Vega |

| 2 May 2021 34 | Valladolid | 1–1 | Real Betis | Valladolid |
| 14:00 CEST (UTC+2) | Sánchez (yellow card) 49'; Weissman 68'; Janko (yellow card) 88' | Report | Ruiz (yellow card) 18'; Guardado (yellow card) 40'; Ruibal 49'; Mandi (yellow card) 90'; Fekir (yellow card) 90+2'; Emerson (yellow card) 90+2' | Stadium: José Zorrilla; Attendance: 0 Referee: Valentín Pizarro Gómez |

| 9 May 2021 35 | Valencia | 3–0 | Valladolid | Valencia |
| 16:15 CEST (UTC+2) | Gómez 45+1', 48'; Correia 89' | Report | | Stadium: Mestalla; Attendance: 0 Referee: Jesús Gil Manzano |

| 13 May 2021 36 | Valladolid | 0–2 | Villarreal | Valladolid |
| 19:00 CEST (UTC+2) | El Yamiq (yellow card) 30'; Kiko (yellow card) 76'; Guardiola (yellow card) 88' | Report | Gerard 68'; Capoue (yellow card) 88', (goal) 90+1' | Stadium: José Zorrilla; Attendance: 0 Referee: Ricardo de Burgos Bengoetxea |

| 16 May 2021 37 | Real Sociedad | 4–1 | Valladolid | San Sebastián |
| 18:30 CEST (UTC+2) | Isak 6', 16'; Silva 28'; Januzaj 35' (pen.), (yellow card) 59'; Bautista (yellow card) 63' | Report | Olaza (yellow card) 34'; Alcaraz (yellow card) 45+1'; Pérez (yellow card) 57'; Roberto (red card) 61'; Marcos André (yellow card) 66', (goal) 82' | Stadium: Anoeta; Attendance: 0 Referee: Carlos del Cerro Grande |

| 22 May 2021 38 | Valladolid | 1–2 | Atlético Madrid | Valladolid |
| 18:00 CEST (UTC+2) | Plano 18'; Marcos André (yellow card) 55'; El Yamiq (yellow card) 70'; Míchel (yellow card) 74'; Fede (yellow card) 78' | Report | Correa 57'; Suárez 67'; Hermoso (yellow card) 68'; Vitolo (yellow card) 68'; Saúl (yellow card) 68'; Félix (yellow card) 78'; Felipe (yellow card) 83'; Lodi (yellow card) 87' | Stadium: José Zorrilla; Attendance: 0 Referee: José María Sánchez Martínez |

=== Copa del Rey ===
| 15 December 2020 First round | Cantolagua | 0–5 | Valladolid | Estella (Note: Cantolagua did not play its game in its main stadium Municipal, in Sangüesa, as it does not meet the requirements to broadcast the match.) |
| 19:00 CET (UTC+1) | | Report | Toni 31', 64'; Jota 37'; Zalazar 55'; Alcaraz 88' | Stadium: Merkatondoa; Referee: Ricardo De Burgos Bengoetxea |

| 5 January 2021 Second round | Marbella | 2–3 (a.e.t.) | Valladolid | Marbella |
| 21:00 CET (UTC+1) | García (yellow card) 45+1'; Granero 60' (pen.); Ruiz (yellow card) 68'; Redru (yellow card) 86'; Gudiño 90+2'; Román (yellow card) 103' | Report | Rubio (yellow card) 41'; Sánchez (yellow card) 45+1'; Zalazar 52'; Alcaraz (yellow card) 58'; Plano 73', 110' | Stadium: Antonio Lorenzo Cuevas; Referee: Javier Alberola Rojas |

| 16 January 2021 Round of 32 | Peña Deportiva | 1–4 (a.e.t.) | Valladolid | Santa Eulària des Riu |
| 12:00 CET (UTC+1) | Andrada 13'; Pomar (yellow card) 36'; De Val (yellow card) 89'; Fernández (red card) 101'; López (yellow card) 113' | Report | Kike (yellow card) 32'; Roberto (yellow card) 44'; Míchel 62' (pen.); Mesa 96' (pen.), 112'; Freitas (yellow card) 113'; Plano 116' | Stadium: Municipal; Referee: David Medié Jiménez |

| 26 January 2021 Round of 16 | Valladolid | 2–4 | Levante | Valladolid |
| 19:00 CET (UTC+1) | Toni 13'; Weissman 65'; Orellana (yellow card) 73'; Alcaraz (yellow card) 80' | Report | Bardhi 23'; Malsa 45'; Coke 59'; Morales 80' (pen.) | Stadium: José Zorrilla; Referee: Valentín Pizarro Gómez |

== Statistics ==
=== Appearances and goals ===
Last updated 22 May 2021.

| No. | Pos | Nat | Player | Total | | La Liga | | Copa del Rey | |
| No. | Pos | Nat | Player | Apps | Goals | Apps | Goals | Apps | Goals |
Goalkeepers
| 1 | GK | (Spain) ESP | Jordi Masip | 25 | 0 | 25 | 0 | 0 | 0 |
| 13 | GK | (Spain) ESP | Roberto | 17 | 0 | 13 | 0 | 4 | 0 |
| 26 | GK | (Spain) ESP | Samuel Pérez | 0 | 0 | 0 | 0 | 0 | 0 |
Defenders
| 2 | DF | (Spain) ESP | Luis Pérez | 26 | 0 | 15+7 | 0 | 3+1 | 0 |
| 4 | DF | (Spain) ESP | Kiko | 5 | 0 | 1+4 | 0 | 0 | 0 |
| 5 | DF | (Spain) ESP | Javi Sánchez | 18 | 0 | 11+5 | 0 | 1+1 | 0 |
| 6 | DF | (Spain) ESP | Bruno González | 28 | 1 | 25+2 | 1 | 1 | 0 |
| 15 | DF | (Morocco) MAR | Jawad El Yamiq | 20 | 0 | 15+4 | 0 | 1 | 0 |
| 18 | DF | (Switzerland) SUI | Saidy Janko | 19 | 0 | 14+5 | 0 | 0 | 0 |
| 22 | DF | (Spain) ESP | Nacho | 23 | 0 | 21+2 | 0 | 0 | 0 |
| 24 | DF | (Spain) ESP | Joaquín | 27 | 1 | 24+1 | 1 | 2 | 0 |
| 25 | DF | (Uruguay) URU | Lucas Olaza | 14 | 1 | 14 | 1 | 0 | 0 |
| 28 | DF | (Spain) ESP | Ignasi Vilarrasa | 3 | 0 | 0 | 0 | 3 | 0 |
| 30 | DF | (Spain) ESP | Miguel Rubio | 4 | 0 | 1+1 | 0 | 1+1 | 0 |
| 43 | DF | (Brazil) BRA | Lucas Freitas | 1 | 0 | 0 | 0 | 0+1 | 0 |
| - | DF | (Spain) ESP | Raúl García | 9 | 1 | 5+3 | 1 | 1 | 0 |
Midfielders
| 8 | MF | (Spain) ESP | Kike Pérez | 27 | 0 | 12+12 | 0 | 2+1 | 0 |
| 10 | MF | (Spain) ESP | Óscar Plano | 38 | 8 | 30+6 | 5 | 1+1 | 3 |
| 11 | MF | (Spain) ESP | Pablo Hervías | 30 | 0 | 10+17 | 0 | 3 | 0 |
| 12 | MF | (Chile) CHI | Fabián Orellana | 32 | 6 | 27+3 | 6 | 1+1 | 0 |
| 14 | MF | (Spain) ESP | Rubén Alcaraz | 33 | 2 | 25+5 | 1 | 1+2 | 1 |
| 17 | MF | (Spain) ESP | Roque Mesa | 28 | 3 | 21+4 | 1 | 1+2 | 2 |
| 19 | MF | (Spain) ESP | Toni Villa | 25 | 5 | 10+11 | 2 | 3+1 | 3 |
| 20 | MF | (Spain) ESP | Fede San Emeterio | 26 | 0 | 17+7 | 0 | 1+1 | 0 |
| 21 | MF | (Spain) ESP | Míchel | 25 | 3 | 10+12 | 2 | 3 | 1 |
| 23 | MF | (Spain) ESP | Waldo Rubio | 13 | 1 | 5+5 | 1 | 3 | 0 |
| 29 | MF | (Spain) ESP | Oriol Rey | 3 | 0 | 0+1 | 0 | 0+2 | 0 |
Forwards
| 3 | FW | (Bosnia and Herzegovina) BIH | Kenan Kodro | 14 | 0 | 4+10 | 0 | 0 | 0 |
| 7 | FW | (Spain) ESP | Sergi Guardiola | 31 | 1 | 19+10 | 1 | 1+1 | 0 |
| 9 | FW | (Israel) ISR | Shon Weissman | 34 | 7 | 24+8 | 6 | 0+2 | 1 |
| 16 | FW | (Brazil) BRA | Marcos André | 23 | 4 | 11+12 | 4 | 0 | 0 |
| 27 | FW | (Spain) ESP | Kuki Zalazar | 6 | 2 | 0+2 | 0 | 3+1 | 2 |
| 40 | FW | (Portugal) POR | Jota | 18 | 2 | 7+10 | 1 | 1 | 1 |
| 41 | FW | (Spain) ESP | Sergio Benito | 5 | 0 | 0+1 | 0 | 3+1 | 0 |
Players who have made an appearance or had a squad number this season but have left the club
| 17 | DF | (Spain) ESP | Javi Moyano | 2 | 0 | 2 | 0 | 0 | 0 |

=== Goalscorers ===
As of 10 January 2021

| Rank | No. | Pos | Nat | Name | La Liga | Copa del Rey | Total |
|---|---|---|---|---|---|---|---|
| 1 | 19 | MF | (Spain) | Toni Villa | 1 | 2 | 3 |
| 1 | 9 | FW | (Israel) | Shon Weissman | 3 | 0 | 3 |
| 1 | 10 | FW | (Spain) | Óscar Plano | 1 | 2 | 3 |
| 1 | 16 | FW | (Brazil) | Marcos André | 3 | 0 | 3 |
| 5 | 12 | MF | (Chile) | Fabián Orellana | 2 | 0 | 2 |
| 5 | 27 | FW | (Spain) | Kuki Zalazar | 0 | 2 | 2 |
| 5 | 40 | MF | (Portugal) | Jota | 1 | 1 | 2 |
| 8 | 3 | DF | (Spain) | Raúl García | 1 | 0 | 1 |
| 8 | 6 | DF | (Spain) | Bruno González | 1 | 0 | 1 |
| 8 | 7 | FW | (Spain) | Sergi Guardiola | 1 | 0 | 1 |
| 8 | 14 | MF | (Spain) | Rubén Alcaraz | 0 | 1 | 1 |
| 8 | 21 | MF | (Spain) | Míchel | 1 | 0 | 1 |
| 8 | 23 | FW | (Spain) | Waldo Rubio | 1 | 0 | 1 |
| Totals | | | | | 16 | 8 | 24 |
