= 2021–22 Real Valladolid season =

Real Valladolid
2021–22 season
- President: Ronaldo
- Head coach: Pacheta
- Stadium: Estadio José Zorrilla
- Segunda División: 2nd (promoted)
- Copa del Rey: Round of 32
Home colours	Away colours

The 2021–22 season was the 94th season in the existence of Real Valladolid and the club's first season back in the second division of Spanish football since 2018. In addition to the domestic league, Valladolid participated in this season's edition of the Copa del Rey.

== Players ==
=== First-team squad ===
As of 2 February 2022.

Note: Flags indicate national team as defined under FIFA eligibility rules; some limited exceptions apply. Players may hold more than one non-FIFA nationality.

No.	Pos.	Nation	Player
1	GK	ESP	Jordi Masip (captain)
2	DF	ESP	Luis Pérez
3	DF	ESP	Raúl García
4	DF	ESP	Kiko Olivas
5	DF	ESP	Javi Sánchez
6	DF	ESP	Josema (on loan from Elche)
7	FW	ESP	Sergio León
8	MF	ESP	Monchu (on loan from Granada)
9	FW	ISR	Shon Weissman
10	MF	ESP	Óscar Plano
11	MF	ESP	Pablo Hervías
12	FW	ECU	Gonzalo Plata (on loan from Sporting CP)
13	GK	ESP	Roberto

No.	Pos.	Nation	Player
15	DF	MAR	Jawad El Yamiq
16	MF	ESP	Álvaro Aguado
17	MF	ESP	Roque Mesa
18	DF	GAM	Saidy Janko
19	MF	ESP	Toni Villa (3rd captain)
20	FW	ESP	Jon Morcillo (on loan from Athletic Bilbao)
21	MF	ESP	Iván Sánchez (on loan from Birmingham City)
22	DF	ESP	Nacho (2nd captain)
23	FW	ESP	Cristo González (on loan from Udinese)
24	DF	ESP	Joaquín
25	MF	MAR	Anuar Tuhami
27	FW	ESP	Hugo Vallejo
—	MF	ESP	Waldo Rubio

=== Reserve team ===
Note: Flags indicate national team as defined under FIFA eligibility rules; some limited exceptions apply. Players may hold more than one non-FIFA nationality.

No.	Pos.	Nation	Player
26	GK	ESP	Samu Casado
31	DF	ESP	Kike Ríos
36	MF	BRA	Dalisson de Almeida

No.	Pos.	Nation	Player
38	MF	ESP	Víctor Narro
42	FW	ESP	Slavy
46	DF	ESP	Iván Fresneda

=== Out on loan ===
Note: Flags indicate national team as defined under FIFA eligibility rules; some limited exceptions apply. Players may hold more than one non-FIFA nationality.

No.	Pos.	Nation	Player
—	GK	ESP	José Antonio Caro (at Burgos until 30 June 2022)
—	DF	ESP	Adri Gómez (at Avilés until 30 June 2022)
—	DF	ESP	Diego Alende (at Lugo until 30 June 2022)
—	DF	URU	Lucas Olaza (at Elche until 30 June 2022)
—	MF	ESP	Adri Carrión (at Racing Rioja until 30 June 2022)
—	MF	ESP	Víctor García (at Deportivo La Coruña until 30 June 2022)
—	MF	ESP	Fede San Emeterio (at Cádiz until 30 June 2022)

No.	Pos.	Nation	Player
—	MF	ESP	Kike Pérez (at Elche until 30 June 2022)
—	MF	ESP	Rubén Alcaraz (at Cádiz until 30 June 2022)
—	FW	ESP	Sergi Guardiola (at Rayo Vallecano until 30 June 2022)
—	FW	ESP	Sergio Benito (at Badajoz until 30 June 2022)
—	FW	ECU	Stiven Plaza (at Independiente del Valle until 30 June 2022)
—	FW	SEN	Sekou Gassama (at Málaga until 30 June 2022)

== Pre-season and friendlies ==
Win Draw Loss Fixtures

30 July 2021 Friendly	Valladolid	Cancelled	Osasuna	Soria, Spain
19:00 CEST (UTC+2)				Stadium: Nuevo Estadio Los Pajaritos

4 August 2021 Friendly	Valladolid	3–1	Rayo Vallecano	Valladolid, Spain
20:00 CEST (UTC+2)				Stadium: José Zorrilla

== Competitions ==
=== Overall record ===
Competition	First match	Last match	Starting round	Final position	Record							
Competition	First match	Last match	Starting round	Final position	Pld	W	D	L	GF	GA	GD	Win %
Segunda División	15 August 2021	29 May 2022	Matchday 1	2nd	42	24	9	9	71	43	+28	57.14
Copa del Rey	30 November 2021	5 January 2022	First round	Round of 32	3	2	0	1	4	4	+0	66.67
Total					45	26	9	10	75	47	+28	57.78

Last updated: 29 May 2022
Source: Soccerway

=== Segunda División ===
==== League table ====
Pos	Team	Pld	W	D	L	GF	GA	GD	Pts	Qualification or relegation
1	Almería (C, P)	42	24	9	9	68	35	+33	81 (Note: Almería finished ahead of Valladolid on head-to-head points: Almería 3–1 Valladolid, Valladolid 2–2 Almería.)	Promotion to La Liga
2	Valladolid (P)	42	24	9	9	71	43	+28	81	Promotion to La Liga
3	Eibar	42	23	11	8	61	45	+16	80	Qualification for promotion play-offs
4	Las Palmas	42	19	13	10	57	47	+10	70	Qualification for promotion play-offs
5	Tenerife	42	20	9	13	53	37	+16	69	Qualification for promotion play-offs

Source: LaLiga SmartBank
Rules for classification: 1) points; 2) head-to-head points; 3) head-to-head goal difference; 4) goal difference; 5) number of goals scored
(C) Champions; (P) Promoted

==== Results summary ====
Overall								Home						Away					
Pld	W	D	L	GF	GA	GD	Pts	W	D	L	GF	GA	GD	W	D	L	GF	GA	GD
42	24	9	9	71	43	+28	81	14	4	3	40	15	+25	10	5	6	31	28	+3

Last updated: 29 May 2022.
Source: La Liga SmartBank

==== Results by round ====
Round	1	2	3	4	5	6	7	8	9	10	11	12	13	14	15	16	17	18	19	20	21	22	23	24	25	26	27	28	29	30	31	32	33	34	35	36	37	38	39	40	41	42
Ground	A	H	A	A	H	A	H	A	H	A	H	A	H	A	H	H	A	H	A	H	A	H	H	A	H	A	H	A	H	A	A	H	A	H	A	H	A	H	A	H	A	H
Result	D	W	W	L	L	L	W	D	D	W	D	W	W	L	W	W	L	W	L	W	W	W	W	D	W	D	D	W	W	W	L	L	W	W	D	D	W	L	W	W	W	W
Position	10	4	2	6	10	10	10	10	10	8	8	7	7	7	6	3	5	5	5	5	5	3	3	3	2	3	4	4	3	3	3	3	3	2	3	3	3	3	3	3	3	2

Updated to match(es) played on 29 May 2022. Source: La Liga SmartBank
A = Away; H = Home; W = Win; D = Draw; L = Loss

==== Matches ====
The league fixtures were announced on 30 June 2021.

15 August 2021 1	Las Palmas	1–1	Valladolid	Las Palmas
21:00 WEST (UTC+1)	Jesé 64'	Report	Marcos André 53'	Stadium: Estadio Gran Canaria; Referee: Dámaso Arcediano Monescillo

20 August 2021 2	Valladolid	2–0	Zaragoza	Valladolid
20:00 CEST (UTC+2)	Sánchez 17'; Toni 90'	Report		Stadium: José Zorrilla; Referee: Eduardo Prieto Iglesias

29 August 2021 3	Lugo	0–2	Valladolid	Lugo
19:30 CEST (UTC+2)		Report	Weissman 11', (red card) 38'; Toni 53'	Stadium: Estadio Anxo Carro; Referee: Gorka Sagués Oscoz

5 September 2021 4	Burgos	3–0	Valladolid	Burgos
16:00 CEST (UTC+2)	García 36' (pen.), 42'; Valcarce 40'	Report		Stadium: Estadio El Plantío; Referee: Álvaro Moreno Aragón

12 September 2021 5	Valladolid	0–2	Tenerife	Valladolid
16:00 CEST (UTC+2)		Report	Shashoua 11'; Jiménez 29' (o.g.)	Stadium: José Zorrilla; Referee: David Gálvez Rascón

18 September 2021 6	Girona	1–0	Valladolid	Girona
20:30 CEST (UTC+2)	Stuani 60' (pen.)			Stadium: Montilivi

26 September 2021 7	Valladolid	2–0	Alcorcón	Valladolid
21:00 CEST (UTC+2)				Stadium: José Zorrilla

1 October 2021 8	Ponferradina	2–2	Valladolid	Ponferrada
21:00 CEST (UTC+2)	Yuri 68' 72'	Report	Alcaraz 68', Weissman 72'; Quieros (red card) 83'	Stadium: Estadio El Toralin

8 October 2021 9	Valladolid	1–1	Málaga	Valladolid
21:00 CEST (UTC+2)	El Yamiq (yellow card) 36'; Roque Mesa (yellow card) 38'; Cristo González (yellow card) 42'; Óscar Plano 53'; Tuhami (yellow card) 90+4'	Report	Brandon Thomas 37' (pen.); Paulino (yellow card) 60'; Juande (yellow card) 84'; Genaro Rodríguez (yellow card) 90+2'	Stadium: José Zorrilla; Attendance: 14,408; Referee: (Spain) Javier Iglesias Villanueva

17 October 2021 10	Leganés	0–2	Valladolid	Leganés
16:00 CEST (UTC+2)	Fede Vico (yellow card) 55'; Shibasaki (yellow card) 70'; Sergi Palencia (yellow card) 77'	Report	Sergio León 25'; Toni Villa (yellow card) 32'; Weissman 87'	Stadium: Estadio Municipal de Butarque; Attendance: 7,436; Referee: (Spain) Luis Milla Alvendiz

31 October 2021 13	Valladolid	2–0	Eibar	Valladolid
18:15 CEST (UTC+2)	Álvaro Aguado (yellow card) 10'; El Yamiq 68'; Toni Villa 81'	Report	Quique González (yellow card) 83'	Stadium: Estadio José Zorrilla; Attendance: 13,322; Referee: (Spain) Francisco Hernández Maeso

20 November 2021 17	Almería	3–1	Valladolid	Almería
20:30 CET	Samú Costa (yellow card) 45+2'; Ramazani 52'; Sergio Akieme 70'; César de la Hoz (yellow card) 77'; Portillo 86'; Babić (yellow card) 90+2'	Report	César de la Hoz 8' (o.g.); Luis Pérez (yellow card) 30'; Óscar Plano (red card) 37'; Sergio León (yellow card) 42'	Stadium: Estadio de los Juegos Mediterráneos; Attendance: 9,208; Referee: Javier Iglesias Villanueva

16 April 2022 36	Valladolid	2–2	Almería	Valladolid
18:15 CET	Roque Mesa 23' (yellow card) 57'; Toni Villa (yellow card) 24' (goal) 48'	Report	Ramazani 20'; Sergio Akieme (yellow card) 21'; Samú Costa (yellow card) 58'; Íñigo Eguaras (yellow card) 73'; Arnau Puigmal (yellow card) 77'; Rodrigo Ely 88'; César de la Hoz (yellow card) 90'; Sadiq (yellow card) 90+6'	Stadium: Estadio José Zorrilla; Attendance: 19,608; Referee: (Spain) Francisco Hernández Maeso

8 May 2022 39	Eibar	0–2	Valladolid	Eibar
16:00 CEST (UTC+2)	José Corpas (yellow card) 9'; Chema (yellow card) 13'; Burgos (yellow card) 25'; Ager Aketxe (yellow card) 71'; Javi Muñoz (yellow card) 90+3'	Report	Nacho (yellow card) 34' (goal) 68' (pen.); Álvaro Aguado (yellow card) 59'; Weissman 80'	Stadium: Ipurua; Referee: (Spain) Luis Mario Milla Alvendiz

=== Copa del Rey ===
5 January 2022 Round of 32	Valladolid	0–3	Real Betis	Valladolid
20:00 CET (UTC+1)	Mesa (yellow card) 26'	Report	Carvalho 24'; Fekir 27'; Rodríguez (yellow card) 47'; Iglesias 50'	Stadium: José Zorrilla; Referee: Ricardo de Burgos Bengoetxea
