= 2018–19 Real Valladolid season =

Real Valladolid
2018–19 season
- Owner: Ronaldo
- President: Carlos Suárez Sureda
- Head coach: Sergio González
- Stadium: José Zorrilla
- La Liga: 16th
- Copa del Rey: Round of 16
Home colours	Away colours	Third colours

During the 2018–19 season, Real Valladolid participated in La Liga and the Copa del Rey.

== Players ==
As of 31 August 2018.

Note: Flags indicate national team as defined under FIFA eligibility rules; some limited exceptions apply. Players may hold more than one non-FIFA nationality.

No.	Pos.	Nation	Player
1	GK	ESP	Jordi Masip (3rd captain)
2	DF	ESP	Joaquín
3	DF	ESP	Moi
4	DF	ESP	Kiko
5	DF	ESP	Fernando Calero
6	MF	ESP	Luismi
7	FW	ESP	Ivi (on loan from Levante)
8	MF	ESP	Borja Fernández
9	FW	TUR	Enes Ünal (on loan from Villarreal)
10	MF	ESP	Óscar Plano
11	MF	ITA	Daniele Verde (on loan from Roma)
13	GK	ESP	Yoel (on loan from Eibar)

No.	Pos.	Nation	Player
14	MF	ESP	Rubén Alcaraz
15	DF	ESP	Alberto Guitián
16	MF	ESP	Antonio Cotán
17	DF	ESP	Javi Moyano (captain)
18	DF	ESP	Antoñito
19	MF	ESP	Toni
20	FW	CRO	Duje Čop (on loan from Standard Liège)
21	MF	ESP	Míchel (Vice-captain)
22	DF	ESP	Nacho
23	MF	MAR	Anuar Tuhami
24	MF	ESP	Keko (on loan from Málaga)
32	MF	ARG	Leonardo Suárez (on loan from Villarreal)

=== Reserve team ===
Note: Flags indicate national team as defined under FIFA eligibility rules; some limited exceptions apply. Players may hold more than one non-FIFA nationality.

No.	Pos.	Nation	Player
26	GK	ESP	Samu Pérez
27	FW	ESP	Miguel de la Fuente
28	DF	GHA	Mohammed Salisu

=== Out on loan ===
Note: Flags indicate national team as defined under FIFA eligibility rules; some limited exceptions apply. Players may hold more than one non-FIFA nationality.

No.	Pos.	Nation	Player
—	GK	ESP	Churripi (at Albacete until 30 June 2019)
—	MF	ESP	Fede (at Granada until 30 June 2019)
—	MF	ESP	David Mayoral (at Alcorcón until 30 June 2019)

No.	Pos.	Nation	Player
—	MF	ESP	Antonio Domínguez (at Sabadell until 30 June 2019)
—	FW	ESP	Chris Ramos (at Sevilla Atlético until 30 June 2019)

== Transfers ==
=== In ===
Date	Player	From	Type	Fee	Ref
30 June 2018	(Spain) Alberto Guitián	(Spain) Sporting de Gijón	Loan return		
30 June 2018	(Equatorial Guinea) Iban Salvador	(Spain) Cultural Leonesa	Loan return		
27 July 2018	(Spain) Ivi	(Spain) Levante	Loan		
28 July 2018	(Spain) Churripi	(Spain) Sevilla Atlético	Transfer	Free	
29 July 2018	(Spain) Keko	(Spain) Málaga	Loan		
3 August 2018	(Spain) Rubén Alcaraz	(Spain) Girona	Transfer	€1,000,000	
8 August 2018	(Italy) Daniele Verde	(Italy) Roma	Loan		
16 August 2018	(Spain) Fede	(Spain) Sevilla Atlético	Transfer	Undisclosed	
19 August 2018	(Croatia) Duje Čop	(Belgium) Standard Liège	Loan		
19 August 2018	(Argentina) Leonardo Suárez	(Spain) Villarreal	Loan		
19 August 2018	(Turkey) Enes Ünal	(Spain) Villarreal	Loan		
30 August 2018	(Spain) Yoel	(Spain) Eibar	Loan		
31 August 2018	(Spain) Joaquín	(Spain) Almería	Transfer	Undisclosed	

=== Out ===
Date	Player	To	Type	Fee	Ref
30 June 2018	(Saudi Arabia) Nooh Al-Mousa	(Saudi Arabia) Al-Fateh	Loan return		
30 June 2018	(Greece) Giannis Gianniotas	(Greece) Olympiacos	Loan return		
30 June 2018	(Spain) Borja Herrera	(Spain) Las Palmas	Loan return		
30 June 2018	(Spain) Pablo Hervías	(Spain) Eibar	Loan return		
30 June 2018	(Spain) Toni Martínez	(England) West Ham United	Loan return		
30 June 2018	(Spain) Javier Ontiveros	(Spain) Málaga	Loan return		
30 June 2018	(Austria) Lukas Rotpuller	TBD		Free	
1 July 2018	(Spain) Deivid	(Spain) Las Palmas	Transfer	Free	
2 July 2018	(Spain) Jaime Mata	(Spain) Getafe	Transfer	Free	
10 July 2018	(Equatorial Guinea) Iban Salvador	(Spain) Celta Vigo B	Transfer	Free	
28 July 2018	(Spain) Churripi	(Spain) Albacete	Loan		
31 July 2018	(Spain) Isaac Becerra	(Spain) Gimnàstic	Transfer	Free	
16 August 2018	(Spain) Fede	(Spain) Granada	Loan		
28 August 2018	(Spain) David Mayoral	(Spain) Alcorcón	Loan		
31 August 2018	(Spain) Antonio Domínguez	(Spain) Sabadell	Loan		
31 August 2018	(Spain) Chris Ramos	(Spain) Sevilla Atlético	Loan		

== Competitions ==
=== Overview ===
Competition	First match	Last match	Starting round	Final position	Record							
Competition	First match	Last match	Starting round	Final position	Pld	W	D	L	GF	GA	GD	Win %
La Liga	17 August 2018	19 May 2019	Matchday 1	16th	38	10	11	17	32	51	−19	26.32
Copa del Rey	31 October 2018	15 January 2019	Round of 32	Round of 16	4	2	1	1	5	4	+1	50.00
Total					42	12	12	18	37	55	−18	28.57

Last updated: 18 May 2019
Source: Competitions

=== La Liga ===
==== League table ====
Pos	Team	Pld	W	D	L	GF	GA	GD	Pts	Qualification or relegation
14	Villarreal	38	10	14	14	49	52	−3	44 (Note: Villarreal finished ahead of Levante on head-to-head points: Villarreal 1–1 Levante, Levante 0–2 Villarreal.)	
15	Levante	38	11	11	16	59	66	−7	44	
16	Valladolid	38	10	11	17	32	51	−19	41 (Note: Valladolid finished ahead of Celta Vigo on head-to-head points: Celta Vigo 3–3 Valladolid, Valladolid 2–1 Celta Vigo.)	
17	Celta Vigo	38	10	11	17	53	62	−9	41	
18	Girona (R)	38	9	10	19	37	53	−16	37	Relegation to Segunda División

Source: La Liga, Soccerway
Rules for classification: 1) Points; 2) Head-to-head points; 3) Head-to-head goal difference; 4) Goal difference; 5) Goals scored; 6) Fair-play points (Note: Head-to-head record is used only after all the matches between the teams in question have been played)
(R) Relegated

==== Results summary ====
Overall								Home						Away					
Pld	W	D	L	GF	GA	GD	Pts	W	D	L	GF	GA	GD	W	D	L	GF	GA	GD
38	10	11	17	32	51	−19	41	5	5	9	16	26	−10	5	6	8	16	25	−9

Last updated: 18 May 2019.
Source: Competitive matches

==== Results by round ====
Round	1	2	3	4	5	6	7	8	9	10	11	12	13	14	15	16	17	18	19	20	21	22	23	24	25	26	27	28	29	30	31	32	33	34	35	36	37	38
Ground	A	H	A	H	A	H	A	H	A	H	A	H	A	H	A	H	A	H	A	A	H	A	H	A	H	A	H	A	H	A	H	H	A	H	A	H	A	H
Result	D	L	D	L	D	W	W	W	W	D	L	D	L	L	W	L	D	L	D	L	W	L	D	L	L	L	L	W	D	L	L	D	D	W	L	W	W	L
Position	13	14	16	19	18	14	9	7	6	6	9	7	13	15	12	12	11	14	15	16	13	14	15	16	16	17	16	16	16	16	17	18	18	17	18	17	16	16

Updated to match(es) played on 18 May 2019. Source: Competitive matches
A = Away; H = Home; W = Win; D = Draw; L = Loss

==== Matches ====
17 August 2018 1	Girona	0–0	Real Valladolid	Girona
20:15 CEST (UTC+2)	Granell (yellow card) 87'	Report	Alcaraz (yellow card) 86'	Stadium: Montilivi; Attendance: 10,246; Referee: Guillermo Cuadra Fernández

25 August 2018 2	Real Valladolid	0–1	Barcelona	Valladolid
22:15 CEST (UTC+2)	Ünal (yellow card) 49'	Report	Dembélé 57'; Piqué (yellow card) 60'	Stadium: José Zorrilla; Attendance: 22,651; Referee: Ricardo de Burgos Bengoetxea

31 August 2018 3	Getafe	0–0	Real Valladolid	Getafe
20:00 CEST (UTC+2)	Portillo (yellow card) 15'; Alejo (yellow card) 42'; Djené (yellow card) 89'	Report	Moyano (yellow card) 40'	Stadium: Coliseum Alfonso Pérez; Attendance: 9,564; Referee: Adrián Cordero Vega

16 September 2018 4	Real Valladolid	0–1	Alavés	Valladolid
18:30 CEST (UTC+2)	Anuar (yellow card) 41'; Nacho (yellow card) 50'; Plano (yellow card) 87'	Report	Brašanac (yellow card) 18'; Aguirregabiria (yellow card) 45'; Ibai 90+3'	Stadium: José Zorrilla; Attendance: 17,678; Referee: José Luis Munuera Montero

22 September 2018 5	Celta Vigo	3–3	Real Valladolid	Vigo
16:15 CEST (UTC+2)	Aspas 5', 54'; Gómez 9'; Roncaglia (yellow card) 42'; Juncà (yellow card) 49'	Report	Alcaraz (yellow card) 20'; Čop (yellow card) 25'; Plano 39'; Ünal 65'; Suárez 90+4'	Stadium: Abanca-Balaídos; Attendance: 16,750; Referee: Eduardo Prieto

27 September 2018 6	Real Valladolid	2–1	Levante	Valladolid
20:00 CEST (UTC+2)	Ünal 50'; Nacho 56'; Antoñito (yellow card) 74'	Report	Morales (yellow card) 22'; Vukčević (yellow card) 41' (yellow-red card) 54'; Postigo 47'; Campaña (yellow card) 90+6'	Stadium: José Zorrilla; Attendance: 16,420; Referee: David Medié Jiménez

30 September 2018 7	Villarreal	0–1	Real Valladolid	Villarreal
16:15 CEST (UTC+2)	Mario (yellow card) 35'; Bacca (yellow card) 45'; Cazorla (yellow card) 60'; Gerard (penalty missed) 83'	Report	Čop (yellow card) 36'; Suárez 53'; Kiko (yellow card) 82'; Nacho (yellow card) 85'	Stadium: Estadio de la Cerámica; Attendance: 15,653; Referee: Ignacio Iglesias Villanueva

7 October 2018 8	Real Valladolid	1–0	Huesca	Valladolid
12:00 CEST (UTC+2)	Míchel (yellow card) 6'; Alcaraz 28'	Report	Gürler (yellow card) 13'; Semedo (yellow card) 27'	Stadium: José Zorrilla; Attendance: 17,474; Referee: Antonio Mateu Lahoz

21 October 2018 9	Real Betis	0–1	Real Valladolid	Seville
20:45 CET (UTC+1)		Report	Antoñito (yellow card) 26' (goal) 35'; Kiko (yellow card) 40'; Nacho (yellow card) 59'; Masip (yellow card) 85'	Stadium: Benito Villamarín; Attendance: 42,581; Referee: Javier Alberola Rojas

26 October 2018 10	Real Valladolid	1–1	Espanyol	Valladolid
21:00 CET (UTC+1)	Kiko (yellow card) 45+2'; Alcaraz (yellow card) 61'; Míchel (yellow card) 63'; Verde 90+1'; Plano (yellow card) 90+3'	Report	Iglesias 20'; J. López (yellow card) 73'; Vilà (yellow card) 75'	Stadium: José Zorrilla; Attendance: 18,262; Referee: Adrián Cordero Vega

3 November 2018 11	Real Madrid	2–0	Real Valladolid	Madrid
16:15 CET (UTC+1)	Asensio (yellow card) 45'; Vinícius 83'; Ramos 88' (pen.)	Report		Stadium: Santiago Bernabéu; Attendance: 68,120; Referee: Jesús Gil Manzano

10 November 2018 12	Real Valladolid	0–0	Eibar	Valladolid
13:00 CET (UTC+1)	Nacho (yellow card) 41'; Calero (yellow card) 81'	Report	Arbilla (yellow card) 15' (yellow-red card) 72'; Peña (yellow card) 63'; Diop (yellow card) 87'	Stadium: José Zorrilla; Attendance: 16,136; Referee: Guillermo Cuadra Fernández

25 November 2018 13	Sevilla	1–0	Real Valladolid	Seville
16:15 CET (UTC+1)	Silva 30'; Escudero (yellow card) 39'; Carriço (yellow card) 64'; Vidal (yellow card) 81'	Report	Antoñito (yellow card) 21'; Fernández (yellow card) 87'; Joaquín (yellow card) 89'	Stadium: Ramón Sánchez Pizjuán; Attendance: 34,110; Referee: Carlos del Cerro Grande

1 December 2018 14	Real Valladolid	2–4	Leganés	Valladolid
16:15 CET (UTC+1)	Toni 50'; Ünal 90+3'	Report	Siovas 11'; Pérez (yellow card) 15'; Óscar 42'; Silva (yellow card) 62'; Carrillo 66', 75'; Nyom (yellow card) 78'	Stadium: José Zorrilla; Attendance: 16,783; Referee: David Medié Jiménez

9 December 2018 15	Real Sociedad	1–2	Real Valladolid	San Sebastián
18:30 CET (UTC+1)	Oyarzabal 62'; Merino (yellow card) 66'; Zaldúa (yellow card) 73'	Report	Calero (yellow card) 4'; Toni 16'; Antoñito 54'; Míchel (yellow card) 71'	Stadium: Anoeta; Attendance: 23,260; Referee: Ignacio Iglesias Villanueva

15 December 2018 16	Real Valladolid	2–3	Atlético Madrid	Valladolid
16:15 CET (UTC+1)	Plano (yellow card) 23'; Toni (yellow card) 27'; Kiko (yellow card) 45'; Calero 57'; Saúl 63' (o.g.); Alcaraz (yellow card) 90+1'	Report	Kalinić 26'; Griezmann 45+1' (pen.), 80'; Koke (yellow card) 78'	Stadium: Estadio José Zorrilla; Attendance: 22,585; Referee: Alberto Undiano Mallenco

22 December 2018 17	Athletic Bilbao	1–1	Real Valladolid	Bilbao
20:45 CET (UTC+1)	D. García (yellow card) 24'; Aduriz 45' (pen.); Yeray (yellow card) 61'; R. García (yellow card) 78'	Report	Míchel (yellow card) 32'; Keko (yellow card) 44'; Plano 90+2'	Stadium: San Mamés; Attendance: 42,633; Referee: José María Sánchez Martínez

5 January 2019 18	Real Valladolid	0–1	Rayo Vallecano	Valladolid
13:00 CET (UTC+1)	Míchel (penalty missed) 88'	Report	Medrán 1'; Embarba (yellow card) 56'; Trejo (yellow card) 59'; Bebé (yellow card) 65'	Stadium: José Zorrilla; Attendance: 17,261; Referee: Adrián Cordero Vega

12 January 2019 19	Valencia	1–1	Real Valladolid	Valencia
15:15 CET (UTC+1)	Parejo (yellow card) 64', (goal) 71'; Coquelin (yellow card) 81'	Report	Plano (yellow card) 13'; Nacho (yellow card) 20'; Ünal (yellow card) 37'; Alcaraz (yellow card) 67', (goal) 82'; Calero (yellow card) 76'	Stadium: Mestalla; Attendance: 36,912; Referee: Ignacio Iglesias Villanueva

20 January 2019 20	Levante	2–0	Real Valladolid	Valencia
18:30 CET (UTC+1)	Bardhi (yellow card) 14'; Coke 42', (yellow card) 90+7'; Rochina (yellow card) 55'; Jason (yellow card) 61'; Cabaco (yellow card) 87'; Roger 90+5', (yellow card) 90+5'	Report	Ünal (yellow card) 15'; Antoñito (yellow card) 40'; Fernández (yellow card) 78'; Calero (yellow card) 90'; Verde (yellow card) 90+7'	Stadium: Ciutat de València; Attendance: 19,107; Referee: Santiago Jaime Latre

27 January 2019 21	Real Valladolid	2–1	Celta Vigo	Valladolid
12:00 CET (UTC+1)	Plano 55'; Toni (yellow card) 60'; Keko 69'; Míchel (yellow card) 90'	Report	Sisto 16'; Mallo (yellow card) 40'; Hoedt (yellow card) 41' (yellow-red card) 87'; Boufal (yellow card) 52'; Juncà (yellow card) 89'	Stadium: José Zorrilla; Attendance: 18,416; Referee: José María Sánchez Martínez

1 February 2019 22	Huesca	4–0	Real Valladolid	Huesca
21:00 CET (UTC+1)	Gallego 19'; Hernández (yellow card) 37'; Pulido 50', (yellow card) 82'; Gómez 53', (yellow card) 85'; Insua (yellow card) 63'; Galán (yellow card) 69'; Ávila 77'; Musto (yellow card) 83'	Report	Anuar (yellow card) 85'; Calero (yellow card) 88'	Stadium: El Alcoraz; Attendance: 6,052; Referee: José Luis Munuera Montero

8 February 2019 23	Real Valladolid	0–0	Villarreal	Valladolid
21:00 CET (UTC+1)	Plano (yellow card) 8'; Alcaraz (yellow card) 56'; Hervías (yellow card) 65'	Report	Funes Mori (yellow card) 29'; Cazorla (yellow card) 42'	Stadium: José Zorrilla; Attendance: 16,842; Referee: Alejandro Hernández Hernández

16 February 2019 24	Barcelona	1–0	Real Valladolid	Barcelona
20:45 CET (UTC+1)	Messi 43' (pen.), (yellow card) 67'	Report	Ünal (yellow card) 11'; Anuar (yellow card) 34'; Míchel (yellow card) 70'	Stadium: Camp Nou; Attendance: 67,435; Referee: Juan Martínez Munuera

24 February 2019 25	Real Valladolid	0–2	Real Betis	Valladolid
18:30 CET (UTC+1)	Nacho (yellow card) 62'	Report	Canales (yellow card) 20'; Mandi 45+3'; Feddal (yellow card) 83'; Joaquín 87'	Stadium: José Zorrilla; Attendance: 20,125; Referee: Pablo González Fuertes

2 March 2019 26	Espanyol	3–1	Real Valladolid	Cornellà
13:00 CET (UTC+1)	Iglesias 1', (yellow card) 90+2'; Darder (yellow card) 52'; Hermoso 55'; Wu Lei 65'	Report	Alcaraz 17', (yellow card) 90+1'; Nacho (yellow card) 68'	Stadium: RCDE Stadium; Attendance: 20,467; Referee: Adrián Cordero Vega

10 March 2019 27	Real Valladolid	1–4	Real Madrid	Valladolid
20:45 CET (UTC+1)	Anuar 29'; Nacho (yellow card) 60'	Report	Odriozola (yellow card) 11'; Varane 34'; Reguilón (yellow card) 47'; Benzema 51' (pen.), 59'; Courtois (yellow card) 63'; Casemiro (yellow card) 68' (yellow-red card) 79'; Modrić 85'; Marcelo (yellow card) 90+3'	Stadium: José Zorrilla; Attendance: 21,914; Referee: Jesús Gil Manzano

17 March 2019 28	Eibar	1–2	Real Valladolid	Eibar
12:00 CET (UTC+1)	José Ángel (yellow card) 50'; Orellana 54' (yellow card) 90+2'; Dmitrović (yellow card) 90'; Cardona (yellow card) 90+7'	Report	Anuar (yellow card) 67'; Alcaraz (yellow card) 74'; Verde 90+1' (pen.); Guardiola 90+3'	Stadium: Ipurua; Attendance: 4,508; Referee: David Medié Jiménez

31 March 2019 29	Real Valladolid	1–1	Real Sociedad	Valladolid
19:30 CEST (UTC+2)	Nacho (yellow card) 2'; Keko 9', (yellow card) 46'; Anuar (yellow card) 55'; Ünal (yellow card) 90+3'	Report	Elustondo (yellow card) 75'; Oyarzabal 79'	Stadium: José Zorrilla; Attendance: 18,775; Referee: Javier Alberola Rojas

4 April 2019 30	Leganés	1–0	Real Valladolid	Leganés
20:30 CEST (UTC+2)	Vesga (yellow card) 78'; Carrillo 90+6', (yellow card) 90+7'	Report	Nacho (yellow card) 77'; Moyano (yellow card) 90+7'	Stadium: Municipal de Butarque; Attendance: 10,185; Referee: Guillermo Cuadra Fernández

7 April 2019 31	Real Valladolid	0–2	Sevilla	Valladolid
16:15 CEST (UTC+2)	Alcaraz (yellow card) 45'; Míchel (yellow card) 47'; Moi (yellow card) 71'	Report	Banega (yellow card) 30'; Ben Yedder (yellow card) 31'; Mesa 84'; Carriço (yellow card) 89'; Munir 90+2'	Stadium: Estadio José Zorrilla; Attendance: 17,989; Referee: José María Sánchez Martínez

14 April 2019 32	Real Valladolid	2–2	Getafe	Valladolid
12:00 CEST (UTC+2)	Anuar (yellow card) 18'; Guardiola 30'; Ünal 69' (pen.); Rubio (yellow card) 71'; Plano (yellow card) 78'; Alcaraz (yellow card) 88'	Report	Arambarri 14', (yellow card) 79'; Olivera (yellow card) 40' (yellow-red card) 62'; Suárez (yellow card) 71'; Molina 90+6' (pen.)	Stadium: José Zorrilla; Attendance: 16,909; Referee: José Luis Munuera Montero

19 April 2019 33	Alavés	2–2	Real Valladolid	Vitoria-Gasteiz
21:00 CEST (UTC+2)	Guidetti 4', (yellow card) 81'; Jony 24'; Calleri (yellow card) 54'; Marín (yellow card) 63'	Report	Joaquín 38', (yellow card) 69'; Calero (yellow card) 73'; Ünal 76' (pen.), (yellow card) 85'; Míchel (yellow card) 80'; Antoñito (yellow card) 82'	Stadium: Mendizorrotza; Attendance: 10,822; Referee: Xavier Estrada Fernández

23 April 2019 34	Real Valladolid	1–0	Girona	Valladolid
20:30 CEST (UTC+2)	Plano (yellow card) 13'; Ünal (yellow card) 24'; Alcaraz (yellow card) 63'; Míchel 67'; Kiko (yellow card) 90+1'	Report	Muniesa (yellow card) 23'; Juanpe (yellow card) 34'; Stuani (yellow card) 90+1'	Stadium: José Zorrilla; Attendance: 19,106; Referee: Juan Martínez Munuera

27 April 2019 35	Atlético Madrid	1–0	Real Valladolid	Madrid
16:15 CEST (UTC+2)	Godín (yellow card) 5'; Thomas (yellow card) 38'; Joaquín 66' (o.g.); Correa (yellow card) 90+2'; Koke (yellow card) 90+4'	Report	Moyano (yellow card) 1'; Alcaraz (yellow card) 35'	Stadium: Wanda Metropolitano; Attendance: 53,123; Referee: Mario Melero López

5 May 2019 36	Real Valladolid	1–0	Athletic Bilbao	Valladolid
18:30 CEST (UTC+2)	Plano (yellow card) 11'; Rubio 21'; Míchel (yellow card) 35'; Alcaraz (yellow card) 41'; Fernández (yellow card) 50'; Toni (yellow card) 84'	Report	Capa (yellow card) 30'; D. García (yellow card) 30'; San José (yellow card) 55'; Aduriz (yellow card) 90+1'; Muniain (yellow card) 90+5'	Stadium: José Zorrilla; Attendance: 22,151; Referee: Antonio Mateu Lahoz

12 May 2019 37	Rayo Vallecano	1–2	Real Valladolid	Madrid
18:30 CEST (UTC+2)	Moreno (yellow card) 69'; Medrán 73'; Pozo (yellow card) 76'	Report	Ünal 6' (pen.); Kiko (yellow card) 77'; Guardiola 80'; Calero (yellow card) 86'	Stadium: Vallecas; Attendance: 10,040; Referee: José María Sánchez Martínez

18 May 2019 38	Real Valladolid	0–2	Valencia	Valladolid
16:15 CEST (UTC+2)	Fernández (yellow card) 26'	Report	Gayà (yellow card) 11'; Diakhaby (yellow card) 21'; Soler 36'; Guedes (yellow card) 41'; Rodrigo 52'	Stadium: José Zorrilla; Attendance: 23,455; Referee: Ricardo de Burgos Bengoetxea

=== Copa del Rey ===
==== Round of 32 ====
31 October 2018 First leg	Mallorca	1–2	Real Valladolid	Palma
20:30 CET (UTC+1)	Ndockyt (yellow card) 30'; Sastre (yellow card) 60'; Buenacasa 67'	Report	Moi (yellow card) 6'; Verde 8', 35'; Luismi (yellow card) 44'	Stadium: Son Moix; Attendance: 3,121; Referee: David Medié Jiménez

5 December 2018 Second leg	Real Valladolid	2–1 (4–2 agg.)	Mallorca	Valladolid
21:30 CET (UTC+1)	Plano 49'; Čop (penalty missed) 83'; Verde 88'	Report	Abdón 48'; Campos (yellow card) 84'	Stadium: José Zorrilla; Attendance: 9,813; Referee: Adrián Cordero Vega

==== Round of 16 ====
9 January 2019 First leg	Getafe	1–0	Real Valladolid	Getafe
20:30 CET (UTC+1)	Foulquier (yellow card) 31'; Sáiz (yellow card) 41'; Ángel 90+2'	Report	Fernández (yellow card) 42'; Čop (yellow card) 73'; Anuar (yellow card) 78'	Stadium: Coliseum Alfonso Pérez; Attendance: 6,007; Referee: Mario Melero López

15 January 2019 Second leg	Real Valladolid	1–1 (1–2 agg.)	Getafe	Valladolid
19:30 CET (UTC+1)	Anuar (yellow card) 16'; Nacho (yellow card) 33'; Verde 50'; Alcaraz (yellow card) 70'	Report	Ángel 29' (pen.); Chichizola (yellow card) 30'; Antunes (yellow card) 33'; Djené (yellow card) 73'; Bruno (yellow card) 84'	Stadium: José Zorrilla; Attendance: 11,183; Referee: Javier Alberola Rojas

== Squad statistics ==
As of match played 7 October 2018

=== Appearances and goals ===
As of match played 18 May 2019

No.	Pos	Nat	Player	Total		La Liga		Copa del Rey	
No.	Pos	Nat	Player	Apps	Goals	Apps	Goals	Apps	Goals
Goalkeepers
1	GK	(Spain) ESP	Jordi Masip	35	0	35	0	0	0
13	GK	(Spain) ESP	Yoel	7	0	3	0	4	0
Defenders
2	DF	(Spain) ESP	Joaquín	17	1	9+4	1	4	0
3	DF	(Spain) ESP	Moi	6	0	3	0	3	0
4	DF	(Spain) ESP	Kiko Olivas	35	0	35	0	0	0
5	DF	(Spain) ESP	Fernando Calero	36	1	35+1	1	0	0
17	DF	(Spain) ESP	Javi Moyano	29	0	25+2	0	2	0
18	DF	(Spain) ESP	Antoñito	33	2	18+12	2	1+2	0
22	DF	(Spain) ESP	Nacho	36	1	35	1	1	0
Midfielders
6	MF	(Spain) ESP	Luismi	2	0	0	0	2	0
8	MF	(Spain) ESP	Borja Fernández	22	0	10+9	0	3	0
11	MF	(Italy) ITA	Daniele Verde	26	6	4+18	2	3+1	4
14	MF	(Spain) ESP	Rubén Alcaraz	35	3	34	3	1	0
15	MF	(Spain) ESP	Pablo Hervías	3	0	2+1	0	0	0
19	MF	(Spain) ESP	Toni	26	2	21+5	2	0	0
21	MF	(Spain) ESP	Míchel	35	1	27+8	1	0	0
23	MF	(Morocco) MAR	Anuar	23	1	12+7	1	4	0
24	MF	(Spain) ESP	Keko	29	2	20+6	2	2+1	0
Forwards
7	FW	(Spain) ESP	Waldo Rubio	8	1	5+3	1	0	0
9	FW	(Turkey) TUR	Enes Ünal	34	6	24+9	6	0+1	0
10	FW	(Spain) ESP	Óscar Plano	36	4	30+3	3	2+1	1
12	FW	(Spain) ESP	Sergi Guardiola	17	3	17	3	0	0
20	FW	(Croatia) CRO	Duje Čop	21	0	6+12	0	3	0
27	FW	(Spain) ESP	Miguel	3	0	0+2	0	1	0
42	FW	(Ecuador) ECU	Stiven Plaza	2	0	0+2	0	0	0
Players who have made an appearance or had a squad number this season but have left the club
7	FW	(Spain) ESP	Ivi	5	0	0+3	0	2	0
12	FW	(Spain) ESP	Christopher Ramos	1	0	1	0	0	0
32	MF	(Argentina) ARG	Leonardo Suárez	15	2	7+5	2	2+1	0

=== Goal scorers ===
Place	Position	Nation	Number	Name	La Liga	Copa del Rey	Total
1	FW	(Turkey)	9	Enes Ünal	2	0	2
1	MF	(Argentina)	32	Leonardo Suárez	2	0	2
3	MF	(Spain)	10	Óscar Plano	1	0	1
3	DF	(Spain)	22	Nacho	1	0	1
3	MF	(Spain)	14	Rubén Alcaraz	1	0	1
				TOTALS	7	0	7

=== Disciplinary record ===
Number	Nation	Position	Name	La Liga		Copa del Rey		Total	
Number	Nation	Position	Name	Booked	Sent off (straight red)	Booked	Sent off (straight red)	Booked	Sent off (straight red)
4	(Spain)	DF	Kiko	1	0	0	0	1	0
9	(Turkey)	FW	Enes Ünal	1	0	0	0	1	0
10	(Spain)	MF	Óscar Plano	1	0	0	0	1	0
14	(Spain)	MF	Rubén Alcaraz	2	0	0	0	2	0
17	(Spain)	DF	Javi Moyano	1	0	0	0	1	0
18	(Spain)	DF	Antoñito	1	0	0	0	1	0
20	(Croatia)	FW	Duje Čop	2	0	0	0	2	0
21	(Spain)	MF	Míchel	1	0	0	0	1	0
22	(Spain)	DF	Nacho	2	0	0	0	2	0
23	(Morocco)	MF	Anuar	1	0	0	0	1	0
Players away from Real Valladolid on loan:
Players who left Real Valladolid during the season:
			TOTALS	13	0	0	0	13	0
