= Kuki Zalazar =

Uruguayan-born Spanish footballer (born 1998)

Personal information
- Full name: José Luis Zalazar Martínez
- Date of birth: 5 May 1998 (age 28)
- Place of birth: Montevideo, Uruguay
- Height: 1.76 m (5 ft 9 in)
- Position: Forward

Team information
- Current team: Ceuta
- Number: 8

Youth career
- Albacete
- 2012–2015: Málaga

Senior career*
Years	Team	Apps	(Gls)
2014–2018	Málaga B	73	(22)
2017–2018	→ Cartagena (loan)	25	(1)
2018–2021	Valladolid B	84	(20)
2018–2021	Valladolid	2	(0)
2021–2022	Ponferradina	28	(0)
2022–2023	Deportivo La Coruña	30	(2)
2023–2025	Córdoba	43	(4)
2025–	Ceuta	53	(9)

International career
2014	Spain U16	4	(1)
2014–2015	Spain U17	17	(6)
- * Club domestic league appearances and goals as of 9 June 2026

José Luis "Kuki" Zalazar Martínez (born 5 May 1998) is a Spanish professional footballer who plays as a forward for Segunda División club Ceuta.

== Club career ==
Born in Montevideo, Kuki moved to Spain at early age and started his career with Albacete Balompié's youth setup. On 30 May 2012, aged only 14, he was signed by Málaga CF.

Kuki made his senior debut with the reserves on 31 August 2014, starting in a 0–0 home draw against Atlético Mancha Real in the Tercera División. The following March, he was linked to potential moves to Premier League sides Liverpool, Chelsea and Manchester City.

Kuki scored his first senior goal on 30 August 2015, in a 3–3 home draw against CD El Ejido 2012. The following January, he was targeted by FC Barcelona.

On 24 June 2017, Kuki scored a brace in a 4–2 home win against AD Unión Adarve, but his side narrowly missed out promotion in the play-offs. On 8 August, he was loaned to Segunda División B side FC Cartagena, for one year.

On 30 August 2018, Kuki moved to another reserve team, Real Valladolid B in the third division. He made his first-team debut on 31 October, starting in a 2–1 away defeat of RCD Mallorca, in the season's Copa del Rey.

Zalazar made his La Liga debut on 19 January 2021, coming on as a late substitute for Roque Mesa in a 2–2 home draw against Elche CF. On 27 August, after Valladolid's relegation, he moved to Segunda División side SD Ponferradina.

On 31 August 2022, Zalazar terminated his contract with Ponfe, and signed a two-year deal with Primera Federación side Deportivo de La Coruña just hours later. Roughly one year later, he agreed to a one-year contract with Córdoba CF.

On 30 June 2024, after helping the Blanquiverdes in their promotion to the second division, Zalazar signed a new one-year deal with the club. The following 3 February, however, he terminated his link and signed a one-and-a-half-year contract with AD Ceuta FC in the third tier just hours later.

== Personal life ==
Kuki is the son of former Uruguay international footballer José Zalazar, a midfielder who notably represented Albacete. His younger brothers Rodrigo Zalazar and Mauro Zalazar are also footballers, and currently play for Portuguese club SC Braga and German club Schalke 04 respectively.
