= Luis Pérez (footballer, born 1995) =

Spanish footballer

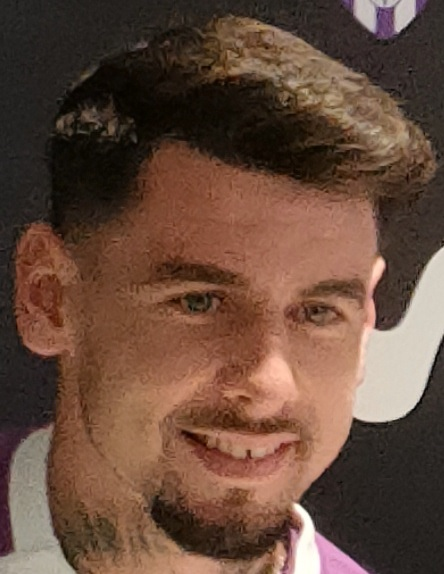

Personal information
- Full name: Luis Jesús Pérez Maqueda
- Date of birth: 4 February 1995 (age 31)
- Place of birth: Utrera, Spain
- Height: 1.74 m (5 ft 9 in)
- Position: Right-back

Team information
- Current team: Gaziantep
- Number: 2

Youth career
- Utrera
- 2006–2014: Sevilla

Senior career*
Years	Team	Apps	(Gls)
2014–2015	Sevilla C	36	(0)
2014–2015	Sevilla B	2	(0)
2015–2016	Jaén	34	(0)
2016–2017	Elche	21	(0)
2017–2020	Tenerife	100	(0)
2020–2025	Valladolid	148	(2)
2025–	Gaziantep	24	(0)
- * Club domestic league appearances and goals as of 10 June 2026

Luis Jesús Pérez Maqueda (born 4 February 1995) is a Spanish professional footballer who plays as a right-back for Turkish Süper Lig club Gaziantep.

== Career ==
=== Sevilla C ===
Born in Utrera, Seville, Andalusia, Pérez finished his graduation with Sevilla, and made his senior debut with the C-team in the 2014–15 season, in Tercera División. He also appeared with the reserves in Segunda División B during that campaign, featuring in two matches.

=== Jaén ===
On 12 July 2015, Pérez moved to fellow third-tier club Real Jaén, signing a one-year deal. He was an undisputed starter during the campaign.

=== Elche ===
He signed for Segunda División side Elche on 11 July 2016.

Pérez made his professional debut on 3 September 2016, coming on as a second-half substitute for Javi Noblejas in a 3–1 home win against Tenerife. On 21 July of the following year, after suffering relegation, he signed a three-year contract with the latter club.

=== Valladolid ===
On 23 July 2020, Pérez signed a three-year deal with La Liga side Real Valladolid.

== Career statistics ==
As of match played 4 June 2024

Appearances and goals by club, season and competition
Club	Season	League			Copa del Rey		Europe		Other		Total	
Club	Season	Division	Apps	Goals	Apps	Goals	Apps	Goals	Apps	Goals	Apps	Goals
Jaén	2015–16	Segunda División B	34	0	0	0	—		—		34	0
Elche	2016–17	Segunda División	21	0	2	0	—		—		23	0
Tenerife	2017–18	Segunda División	30	0	2	0	—		—		32	0
Tenerife	2018–19	Segunda División	34	0	0	0	—		—		34	0
Tenerife	2019–20	Segunda División	36	0	2	0	—		—		38	0
Tenerife	Total		100	0	4	0	—		0	0	104	0
Real Valladolid	2020–21	La Liga	22	0	4	0	—		—		26	0
Real Valladolid	2021–22	Segunda División	37	2	0	0	—		—		37	2
Real Valladolid	2022–23	La Liga	18	0	2	0	—		—		20	0
Real Valladolid	2023–24	Segunda División	41	0	1	0	—		—		42	0
Real Valladolid	Total		118	2	7	0	—		0	0	125	2
Career total			273	2	13	0	0	0	0	0	286	2
