= Saidy Janko =

Gambian footballer (born 1995)

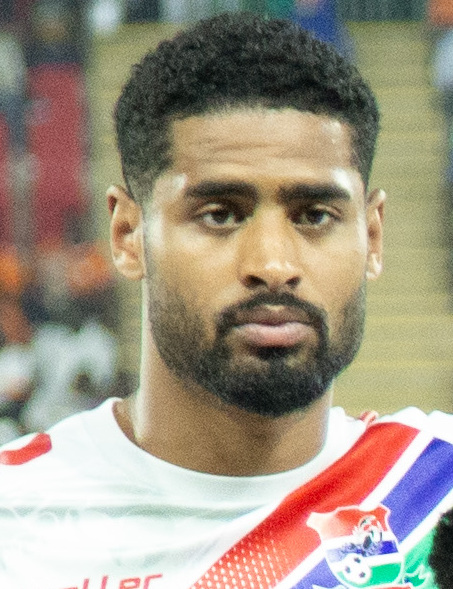
- Janko in 2024

Personal information
- Full name: Saidy Janko
- Date of birth: 22 October 1995 (age 31)
- Place of birth: Zürich, Switzerland
- Height: 1.81 m (5 ft 11 in)
- Position: Right-back

Team information
- Current team: Young Boys
- Number: 17

Youth career
- 2011–2013: Zürich
- 2013–2014: Manchester United

Senior career*
Years	Team	Apps	(Gls)
2014–2015	Manchester United	0	(0)
2015	→ Bolton Wanderers (loan)	10	(1)
2015–2017	Celtic	12	(0)
2016–2017	→ Barnsley (loan)	14	(1)
2017–2018	Saint-Étienne	21	(0)
2017–2018	Saint-Étienne B	4	(0)
2018–2020	Porto	0	(0)
2018–2019	→ Nottingham Forest (loan)	15	(0)
2019–2020	→ Young Boys (loan)	33	(0)
2020–2023	Valladolid	34	(0)
2022–2023	→ VfL Bochum (loan)	20	(0)
2023–	Young Boys	57	(0)

International career^{‡}
2012–2013	Switzerland U18	6	(0)
2013–2014	Switzerland U19	7	(1)
2014–2016	Switzerland U20	3	(0)
2014–2015	Switzerland U21	4	(0)
2021–	Gambia	10	(0)
- * Club domestic league appearances and goals as of 23 August 2026 ‡ National team caps and goals as of 19 January 2024

Saidy Janko (born 22 October 1995) is a professional footballer who plays as a right-back for Swiss club Young Boys. Born in Switzerland, he played international football for Switzerland up to under-21 level before switching to play for the Gambia national team at senior level.

Janko began his career with Zürich before signing for Manchester United in 2013. After a loan spell with Bolton Wanderers, Janko moved to Scottish club Celtic in 2015. He had a loan to Barnsley before moving to Saint-Étienne permanently in July 2017.

== Club career ==
=== Manchester United ===
Janko began his career with Zürich. He joined Manchester United on summer transfer deadline day in 2013. He was one of only three signings made by David Moyes during the 2013 summer transfer window. In his first season, he was voted the Reserve Player of the Year. On 26 August 2014, he made his first-team debut in a League Cup match against Milton Keynes Dons, playing the first half before being substituted for fellow debutant Andreas Pereira as United lost 4–0.

On 2 February 2015, transfer deadline day, Janko joined Championship club Bolton Wanderers on loan for the rest of the season, with Andy Kellett going in the opposite direction for the same period. He made his debut for the club on 10 February, starting in a 3–1 league win over Fulham at the Macron Stadium. He crossed to assist Eiður Guðjohnsen's equaliser before half time, before scoring himself in the 80th minute from 25 yards out.

=== Celtic ===
On 1 July 2015, Celtic announced that they had signed Janko on a four-year contract. He made his debut nine days later, coming on as a substitute for Gary Mackay-Steven 75 minutes into Celtic's 1–0 win over Real Sociedad in a pre-season friendly at St. Mirren Park. Janko made his competitive debut on 1 August, coming on as a second-half substitute during Celtic's 2–0 win over Ross County in the opening league match of the Scottish Premiership season.

On 31 August 2016, Janko joined Championship club Barnsley on a one-year loan deal. He scored on his debut in a 4–0 away win against Wolverhampton Wanderers on 13 September.

=== Saint-Étienne ===
On 7 July 2017, Janko left Celtic for French Ligue 1 club Saint-Étienne, signing a four-year contract.

=== Porto ===
Janko moved to Portuguese club Porto on a five-year contract on 17 June 2018. He returned to the EFL Championship on 31 August that year, joining Nottingham Forest on loan for the 2018–19 season.

On 1 July 2019, Janko entered football in his native country for the first time in his career, being loaned to Young Boys for the Swiss Super League season. He scored his first goal on 14 September in the second round of the Swiss Cup, in an 11–2 win against fifth-tier FC Freienbach. In total, Janko played 46 official matches, starting 38 of them, as they won the double (Super League and Cup).

=== Valladolid ===
On 1 October 2020, Real Valladolid signed Janko on a four-year contract to end in 2024, for an undisclosed fee. He made his debut in La Liga 24 days later in a 2–0 home loss to Alavés.

On 27 June 2022, VfL Bochum announced the signing of Janko on a season-long loan, with an option to buy at the end of the spell.

=== Young Boys ===
On 30 June 2023, Real Valladolid announced that Janko had joined Swiss side Young Boys, where he had previously played on loan while a Porto player, on a permanent basis.

He missed out on the chance to face his former club, Celtic, in the Champions League in January 2025, due to injury.

== International career ==
Janko was born in Zürich to a Gambian father and an Italian mother. He was a youth international for Switzerland from 2012 to 2015, before opting to represent the Gambia in 2021. He made his debut for the Gambia national team in a 2–0 friendly loss to Sierra Leone on 9 October 2021.

He played in the 2021 Africa Cup of Nations, his national team's first continental tournament, where they reached the quarter-finals.

== Personal life ==
He is the brother of fellow professional footballer Lenny Janko.

== Career statistics ==
=== Club ===
As of match played 23 August 2026

Appearances and goals by club, season and competition
Club	Season	League			National cup		League cup		Europe		Total	
Club	Season	Division	Apps	Goals	Apps	Goals	Apps	Goals	Apps	Goals	Apps	Goals
Manchester United	2014–15	Premier League	0	0	0	0	1	0	0	0	1	0
Bolton Wanderers (loan)	2014–15	Championship	10	1	0	0	—		—		10	1
Celtic	2015–16	Scottish Premiership	10	0	0	0	1	0	2 (Note: One appearance in UEFA Champions League, one in UEFA Europa League)	0	13	0
Celtic	2016–17	Scottish Premiership	2	0	0	0	1	0	4 (Note: Appearances in UEFA Champions League)	0	7	0
Celtic	Total		12	0	0	0	2	0	6	0	20	0
Barnsley (loan)	2016–17	Championship	14	1	0	0	0	0	—		14	1
Saint-Étienne	2017–18	Ligue 1	21	0	0	0	1	0	—		22	0
Porto	2018–19	Primeira Liga	0	0	—		—		—		0	0
Nottingham Forest (loan)	2018–19	Championship	15	0	1	0	1	0	—		17	0
Young Boys (loan)	2019–20	Swiss Super League	33	0	5	1	—		8 (Note: Two appearances in UEFA Champions League, six appearances and one goal in UEFA Europa League)	1	46	2
Real Valladolid	2020–21	La Liga	19	0	0	0	—		—		19	0
Real Valladolid	2021–22	La Liga 2	15	0	1	0	—		—		15	0
Real Valladolid	Total		34	0	1	0	—		—		35	0
Bochum (loan)	2022–23	Bundesliga	20	0	3	0	—		—		23	0
Young Boys	2023–24	Swiss Super League	30	0	1	1	—		6 (Note: Five appearances in UEFA Champions League, one appearance in UEFA Europa League)	0	37	1
Young Boys	2025–26	Swiss Super League	26	0	2	0	—		9 (Note: Appearances in UEFA Europa League)	1	37	1
Young Boys	2026–27	Swiss Super League	1	0	1	0	—		—		2	0
Young Boys	Total		57	0	5	1	—		15	1	72	2
Young Boys II	2024–25	Swiss Promotion League	3	0	—		—		—		3	0
Career total			181	2	13	2	5	0	28	2	209	6

=== International ===
Appearances and goals by national team and year
National team	Year	Apps	Goals
Gambia	2021	3	0
Gambia	2022	3	0
Gambia	2023	2	0
Gambia	2024	2	0
Total		10	0

== Honours ==
Celtic

- Scottish Premiership: 2015–16, 2016–17

Young Boys

- Swiss Super League: 2019–20
- Swiss Cup: 2019–20

Individual

- Denzil Haroun Reserve Player of the Year: 2013–14
