= Shon Weissman =

Israeli footballer (born 1996)

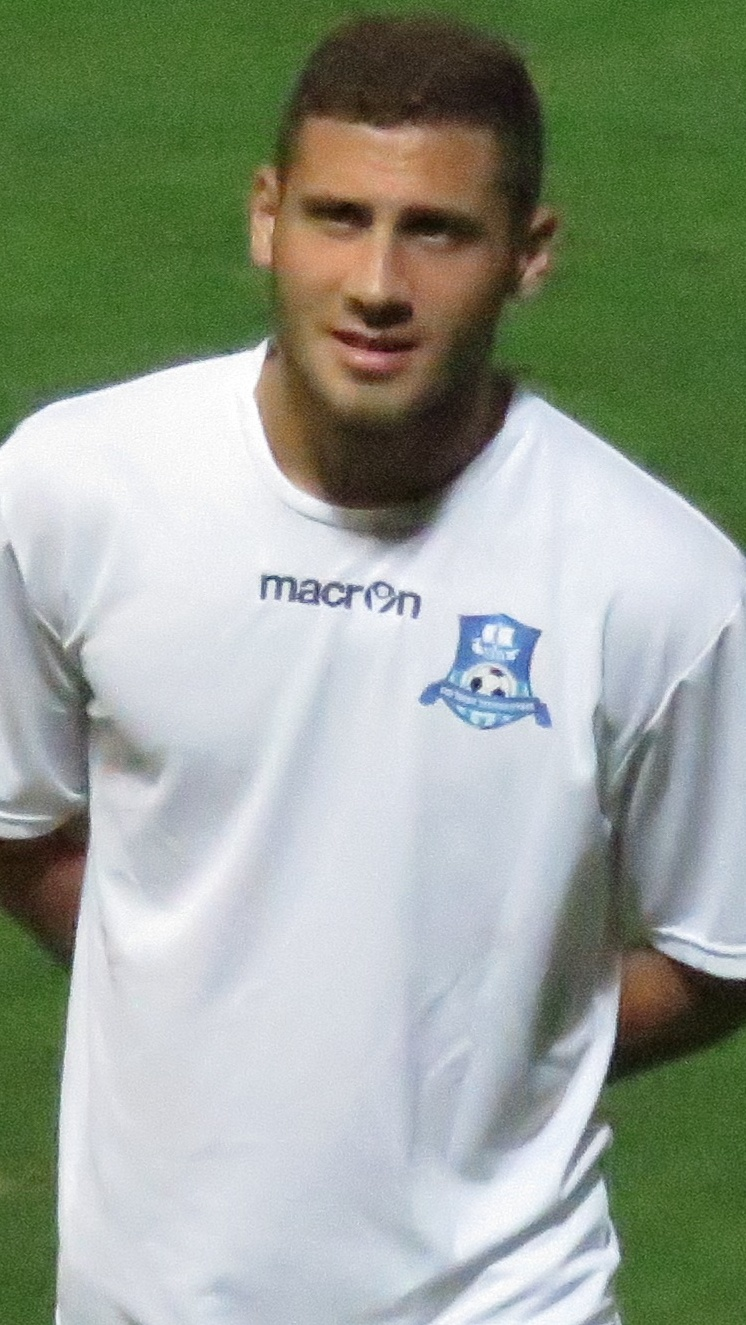
- Weissman with Hapoel Acre in 2015

Personal information
- Full name: Shon Zalman Weissman
- Date of birth: 14 February 1996 (age 30)
- Place of birth: Haifa, Israel
- Height: 1.74 m (5 ft 9 in)
- Position: Forward

Team information
- Current team: Beitar Jerusalem

Youth career
- 2006–2011: Hapoel Haifa
- 2011–2016: Maccabi Haifa

Senior career*
Years	Team	Apps	(Gls)
2014–2019	Maccabi Haifa	38	(8)
2015–2016	→ Hapoel Acre (loan)	18	(0)
2016–2017	→ Maccabi Netanya (loan)	21	(12)
2017–2018	→ Ironi Kiryat Shmona (loan)	27	(3)
2019–2020	Wolfsberger AC	31	(30)
2020–2023	Valladolid	85	(27)
2023	→ Granada (loan)	13	(1)
2023–2025	Granada	35	(2)
2024	→ Salernitana (loan)	11	(1)
2025–2026	Blau-Weiß Linz	27	(9)
2026–	Beitar Jerusalem	4	(1)

International career^{‡}
2011–2012	Israel U16	11	(2)
2012–2013	Israel U17	13	(7)
2013	Israel U18	5	(4)
2013–2014	Israel U19	22	(2)
2017–2018	Israel U21	13	(3)
2019–	Israel	33	(6)
- * Club domestic league appearances and goals as of 15 September 2026 ‡ National team caps and goals as of 21 November 2023

Shon Zalman Weissman (or Sean, Hebrew: שון זלמן וייסמן; born 14 February 1996) is an Israeli professional footballer who plays as a forward for Israeli Premier League club Beitar Jerusalem and the Israel national team.

An academy graduate of Israeli side Maccabi Haifa, Weissman made his senior debut for the club in 2014 before spending three seasons on loan with Hapoel Acre, Maccabi Netanya, and Ironi Kiryat Shmona. At Maccabi Netanya, he scored 12 goals as the club achieved promotion to the Israeli Premier League. In the 2019–20 season, while playing with Austrian side Wolfsberger AC, he became the club's first goalscorer in a European competition and was the Austrian Bundesliga's top scorer with 30 goals from 31 matches. He then moved to Spain, representing Real Valladolid and Granada in La Liga and the Segunda División.

Formerly an Israel youth international, Weissman represented the nation from under-17 level. He made his senior international debut in September 2019.

== Early life ==
Weissman was born and raised in the neighbourhood of Kiryat Haim of the city of Haifa, Israel, to an Israeli family of Ashkenazi Jewish and Sephardi Jewish descent. His parents divorced when he was 13, and he lived with his mother Varda and his younger brother Shoval. His grandmother is a Holocaust survivor.

== Club career ==
=== Maccabi Haifa ===
Weissman started his career with Israeli hometown club, Maccabi Haifa. On 20 January 2014, 17-year-old Weissman made his senior debut in the Israeli Premier League match against Hapoel Be'er Sheva. He came off the bench in the 79th minute, replacing Ran Abukarat. He ended the season with 10 league appearances, while only appearing in two games in the following season.

==== 2015–18: Loan spells ====
On 19 August 2015, Weissman signed for fellow Israeli Premier League club Hapoel Acre on a season-long loan from Maccabi Haifa. After scoring no goals in 18 appearances, the loan deal was cancelled in January 2016.

For the 2016–17 season, Weissman was sent on a season-long loan again, this time to second division club Maccabi Netanya. He managed to score 12 goals in 21 league appearances, helping Maccabi Netanya achieve promotion to the Israeli Premier League as they were crowned champions at the end of the season.

In the following season, Weissman made one appearance for Maccabi Haifa before being sent out on loan once again in August 2017, this time to fellow Premier League side Ironi Kiryat Shmona. In September 2017, in a league match against F.C. Ashdod, Weissman scored his first goal on the highest level of Israeli football in a 2–0 win for Ironi Kiryat Shmona. He made 26 league appearances for the club, scoring three times.

==== 2018–19: Return to Maccabi Haifa ====
Following the expiration of his loan, Weissman returned to Maccabi Haifa. He made his first appearance in the season as a substitute in the league match against Maccabi Tel Aviv on 26 August, receiving a yellow card shortly after in a 0–2 loss. A few days later, on 1 September, Weissman scored his first Maccabi Haifa goal when he netted in a 2–0 home win over F.C. Ashdod. He ended the season with eight goals in 25 league appearances.

=== Wolfsberger AC ===
On 20 June 2019, Weissman joined Austrian Football Bundesliga club Wolfsberger AC, signing a two-year contract and being handed shirt No. 9. On 17 August, in the fourth round of the league, he scored four goals in a 5–0 home victory over SV Mattersburg. Before the match, he had scored in three consecutive league appearances for the Carinthian club.

On 19 September 2019, Weissman scored the first goal in a 4–0 win over German club Borussia Mönchengladbach in the Europa League group stage, Wolfsberger AC's first European goal ever. He finished the 2019–20 season with 30 league goals which made him the Austrian Bundesliga's top scorer.

=== Valladolid ===
On 31 August 2020, Weissman signed with Spanish La Liga club Real Valladolid until 2024. He became the most expensive signing in Real Valladolid's history at €4 million. He scored his first goals in his ninth game for Valladolid, a 3–2 home win over CA Osasuna.

After his first season ended in relegation, Weissman remained playing for Valladolid in the Segunda División, helping them to return to La Liga after one season. On 29 August 2021, he scored in a 2–0 win at CD Lugo before receiving a straight red card in the 38th minute. Over September and October, he netted in four successive games to go top of the goalscoring charts.

On 5 September 2022, having recovered from a pre-season injury, he made his season debut in the 2022–23 La Liga season during its fourth game week, coming on as a second-half substitute and scoring the only goal of the game goal against UD Almería.

=== Granada ===
On 31 January 2023, Weissman was loaned to Granada in the Segunda División until the end of the season. The deal included an obligatory buyout clause of €3 million in case the club earned promotion back to La Liga.

On 5 February 2023, Weissman scored his first goal for Granada during his debut in the fourth minute of an away league match against Villarreal B that ended in a 2–0 victory. In June, after the club's promotion to the first division, he was bought outright.

On 1 February 2024, Weissman moved to Serie A club Salernitana on loan for the remainder of the season. He played 11 times for the team from Campania, scoring on his debut on 9 February in a 3–1 home loss to Empoli.

Upon returning, Weissman lost his starting spot in the second division before terminating his link with Granada on 1 September 2025.

=== Blau-Weiß Linz ===
On 9 September 2025, Weissman signed for Blau-Weiß Linz.

== International career ==
Weissman made his youth international level debut in 2011 for Israel. From 2017 to 2018, he was part of the Israel U21 national team.

Weissman made his senior debut with the Israel national team on 9 September 2019, in a UEFA Euro 2020 qualifier against Slovenia. He started the game and was substituted in the 61st minute. He scored his first goal for the national team on 4 September 2021 against Austria in a 2022 FIFA World Cup qualifiers match, that ended in a 5–2 home win for Israel.

== Personal life ==
Weissman is observant and does not play football on the Jewish high holiday of Yom Kippur. He was enlisted and has served in the Israeli Air Force to complete his mandatory military service.

He also holds a Portuguese passport, on account of his Sephardi Jewish ancestors, which eases the move to certain European football leagues.

On 22 May 2019, he married his Israeli girlfriend Eden (née Markovich), his high school sweetheart. Their first daughter, Alma Leah Weissman, was born in August 2020.

=== Views on the Gaza war ===
Shortly after the October 7 attacks into Israel from Gaza, Weissman posted, liked, and reposted calls on X (formerly Twitter) in support of Israel's actions during the ongoing Gaza war. His posts included the statement "What is the logical reason why 200 tons of bombs have not already been dropped on Gaza?", and "Why the hell aren't they being shot in the head?" in reference to a photo of two detained Palestinians. Weissman also liked a post stating "All of Gaza supports terrorism. All of Gaza is dead", and posts stating "Erase Gaza", "Drop a 200 ton bomb on it", and posts stating there are no innocents in Gaza. Weissman subsequently deleted the posts, saying that he had made a mistake and had been acting in the heat of the moment.

Weissman's posts and likes have sparked outrage in Spain, where in early 2024 he was reported to the authorities for incitement and provocation to violence. In 2025, Fortuna Düsseldorf planned to sign Weissman but, following backlash related to Weissman's social media activity, the team announced that he would not be joining.

== Career statistics ==
=== Club ===
As of match played 1 June 2025

Appearances and goals by club, season and competition
Club	Season	League			National cup (Note: Includes Israel State Cup, Austrian Cup, Copa del Rey)		League cup (Note: Includes Toto Cup)		Europe		Total	
Club	Season	Division	Apps	Goals	Apps	Goals	Apps	Goals	Apps	Goals	Apps	Goals
Maccabi Haifa	2013–14	Israeli Premier League	10	0	1	0	—		0	0	11	0
Maccabi Haifa	2014–15	Israeli Premier League	2	0	1	0	0	0	—		3	0
Maccabi Haifa	2017–18	Israeli Premier League	1	0	0	0	3	0	—		4	0
Maccabi Haifa	2018–19	Israeli Premier League	25	8	1	1	5	1	—		31	10
Maccabi Haifa	Total		38	8	3	1	8	1	—		49	10
Hapoel Acre (loan)	2015–16	Israeli Premier League	18	0	0	0	0	0	—		18	0
Maccabi Netanya (loan)	2016–17	Liga Leumit	21	12	1	0	0	0	—		22	12
Kiryat Shmona (loan)	2017–18	Israeli Premier League	21	3	4	0	5	0	—		30	3
Wolfsberger AC	2019–20	Austrian Bundesliga	31	30	3	5	—		6 (Note: Appearances in UEFA Europa League)	2	40	37
Valladolid	2020–21	La Liga	32	6	2	1	—		—		34	7
Valladolid	2021–22	Segunda División	38	20	3	1	—		—		41	21
Valladolid	2022–23	La Liga	15	1	2	1	—		—		17	2
Valladolid	Total		85	27	7	3	—		—		92	30
Granada (loan)	2022–23	Segunda División	13	1	0	0	—		—		13	1
Granada	2023–24	La Liga	5	0	1	1	—		—		6	1
Granada	2024–25	Segunda División	28	2	3	2	—		—		31	4
Granada	Total		33	2	4	3	—		—		37	5
Salernitana (loan)	2023–24	Serie A	11	1	0	0	—		—		11	1
Career total			271	84	22	12	13	1	6	2	312	99

=== International ===
As of match played 21 November 2023

Appearances and goals by national team and year
National team	Year	Apps	Goals
Israel	2019	4	0
Israel	2020	7	0
Israel	2021	9	2
Israel	2022	5	2
Israel	2023	8	2
Total		33	6

Scores and results list Israel's goal tally first, score column indicates score after each Weissman goal.

List of international goals scored by Shon Weissman
No.	Date	Venue	Opponent	Score	Result	Competition
1	4 September 2021	Sammy Ofer Stadium, Haifa, Israel	Austria	4–2	5–2	2022 FIFA World Cup qualification
2	15 November 2021	Netanya Stadium, Netanya, Israel	Faroe Islands	2–0	3–2	2022 FIFA World Cup qualification
3	2 June 2022	Sammy Ofer Stadium, Haifa, Israel	Iceland	2–2	2–2	2022–23 UEFA Nations League B
4	24 September 2022	Bloomfield Stadium, Tel Aviv, Israel	Albania	1–0	2–1	2022–23 UEFA Nations League B
5	16 June 2023	Szusza Ferenc Stadion, Budapest, Hungary	Belarus	1–1	2–1	UEFA Euro 2024 qualifying
6	18 November 2023	Szusza Ferenc Stadion, Budapest, Hungary	Switzerland	1–1	1–1	UEFA Euro 2024 qualifying

== Honours ==
Maccabi Netanya

- Liga Leumit: 2016–17

Real Valladolid

- Segunda División: 2021–22

Granada

- Segunda División: 2022–23

Individual

- Austrian Bundesliga Top goalscorer: 2019–20
- Austrian Bundesliga Team of the Year: 2019–20
- Real Valladolid's Player of the Season: 2021–22
- Real Valladolid's Top goalscorer: 2021–22
