= Marcos André =

Brazilian footballer

Personal information
- Full name: Marcos André de Sousa Mendonça
- Date of birth: 20 October 1996 (age 30)
- Place of birth: Coroatá, Brazil
- Height: 1.84 m (6 ft 0 in)
- Position: Forward

Team information
- Current team: Al-Najma (on loan from Valladolid)

Youth career
- 2014: Sobradinho
- 2015: Araguaína
- 2015: Guaratinguetá

Senior career*
Years	Team	Apps	(Gls)
2015–2019	Celta B	0	(0)
2015–2016	→ Órdenes (loan)	23	(5)
2016–2017	→ Logroñés B (loan)	13	(6)
2017–2019	→ Logroñés (loan)	84	(23)
2019–2020	Valladolid B	1	(0)
2019–2020	→ Mirandés (loan)	38	(12)
2020–2021	Valladolid	24	(5)
2021–2023	Valencia	46	(2)
2023–	Valladolid	61	(7)
2026–	→ Al-Najma (loan)	0	(0)
- * Club domestic league appearances and goals as of 9 June 2026

Marcos André de Sousa Mendonça (born 20 October 1996), known as Marcos André, is a Brazilian professional footballer who plays as a forward for Saudi club Al-Najma SC, on loan from Spanish club Real Valladolid.

== Career ==
=== Celta ===
Born in São Luís but raised in Coroatá in the state of Maranhão, Marcos André represented Sobradinho, Araguaína and Guaratinguetá as a youth. In March 2015, he went on a trial at La Liga side RC Celta de Vigo, signing a two-year contract in July and being initially assigned to the reserves.

In October 2015, Marcos André was loaned to Tercera División side SD Órdenes until the end of the season. The following 31 August, he moved to fellow fourth division side UD Logroñés B also in a temporary deal; during the campaign, he also featured regularly for the main squad in Segunda División B.

On 17 July 2017, Marcos André's loan was renewed for two years, now definitely assigned to the first team. He was a regular starter for the club, scoring 11 goals in 2017–18 and ten goals in 2018–19 as the club missed out promotion in the play-offs.

=== Valladolid ===
On 23 July 2019, Marcos André agreed to a four-year deal with Real Valladolid, being assigned to the B-team in the third division. On 30 August, he was loaned to Segunda División side CD Mirandés for one year.

Marcos André made his professional debut on 31 August 2019, coming on as a second-half substitute for Mario Barco in a 2–0 away loss against CD Numancia. He scored his first goal in the second division on 29 September, netting the opener in a 1–1 away draw against Deportivo de La Coruña, and ended the season with 12 goals to his name.

Upon returning from loan, Marcos André was assigned to the first team in La Liga, and made his debut in the category on 3 October 2020 by starting in a 2–1 home loss against SD Eibar. In his second appearance on 8 November, he scored his team's second in a 2–1 home success over Athletic Bilbao.

=== Valencia ===
On 25 August 2021, after Valladolid's relegation, Marcos André moved to Valencia CF in the top tier, on a five-year deal. Used mainly as a substitute in his first season, he scored his first goal on 25 September in the fourth minute of added time to earn a draw at home to Athletic; the following 16 January in the last 16 of the Copa del Rey, he scored the only goal in the first minute at third-tier CD Atlético Baleares.

=== Valladolid return ===
On 29 August 2023, Marcos André returned to Valladolid on a five-year contract, with the club in the second division. He struggled with injuries after returning, missing nearly half of the club's matches in the following three seasons.

==== Loan to Al-Najma ====
On 20 September 2026, Marcos André was loaned to Saudi First Division League side Al-Najma SC, with a buyout clause.

== Career statistics ==
As of 25 August 2023

Appearances and goals by club, season and competition
Club	Season	League			National cup		Other		Total	
Club	Season	Division	Apps	Goals	Apps	Goals	Apps	Goals	Apps	Goals
Órdenes (loan)	2015–16	Tercera División	23	5	0	0	—		23	5
Logroñés B (loan)	2016–17	Tercera División	13	6	0	0	—		13	6
Logroñés (loan)	2016–17	Segunda División B	18	2	0	0	—		18	2
Logroñés (loan)	2017–18	Segunda División B	35	11	3	1	—		38	12
Logroñés (loan)	2018–19	Segunda División B	35	10	3	2	—		38	12
Logroñés (loan)	Total		88	23	6	3	0	0	94	26
Real Valladolid B	2019–20	Segunda División B	1	0	0	0	—		1	0
Mirandés (loan)	2019–20	Segunda División	38	12	7	0	—		45	12
Real Valladolid	2020–21	La Liga	23	4	0	0	—		23	4
Real Valladolid	2021–22	Segunda División	1	1	0	0	—		1	1
Real Valladolid	Total		24	5	0	0	—		24	5
Valencia	2021–22	La Liga	29	1	6	2	—		35	3
Valencia	2022–23	La Liga	17	1	2	0	—		19	1
Valencia	Total		46	2	8	2	—		54	4
Valladolid	2023–24	Segunda División	16	3	0	0	—		16	3
Career total			249	56	21	5	0	0	270	61

== Honors ==
Mirandés

- Copa Federación de España: 2018–19
