= Toni Villa =

Spanish footballer

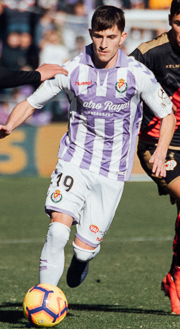
- Toni with Valladolid in 2019

Personal information
- Full name: Laureano Antonio Villa Suárez
- Date of birth: 7 January 1995 (age 31)
- Place of birth: Murcia, Spain
- Height: 1.71 m (5 ft 7 in)
- Position: Winger

Youth career
- Valladolid

Senior career*
Years	Team	Apps	(Gls)
2014–2016	Valladolid B	74	(7)
2016–2017	Cultural Leonesa	36	(5)
2017–2022	Valladolid	139	(11)
2022–2024	Girona	26	(1)
2024–2026	Eibar	24	(0)
- * Club domestic league appearances and goals as of 6 June 2026

Laureano Antonio "Toni" Villa Suárez (born 7 January 1995), known as Toni Villa or simply Toni, is a Spanish professional footballer who plays as a left winger.

== Career ==
=== Valladolid ===
Born in Murcia, Toni represented Real Valladolid as a youth. He made his senior debut with the reserves on 23 April 2014, coming on as a half-time substitute in a 5–1 Tercera División home routing of Racing Lermeño CF.

Toni scored his first senior goal on 28 September 2014, netting the winner in a 4–3 home success over Real Oviedo in the Segunda División B. On 8 June 2016 he extended his contract until 2018.

=== Cultural Leonesa ===
On 4 August 2016, Toni was transferred to fellow third-tier club Cultural y Deportiva Leonesa. He contributed with five goals in 41 appearances overall, helping the club in their promotion to the Segunda División after 42 years.

=== Valladolid return ===
On 12 June 2017, Toni returned to Valladolid, with the club activating his buy-back clause, and was definitively assigned to the main squad also in the second division. He made his professional debut on 3 September, replacing Míchel in a 2–0 home win against CD Tenerife.

On 4 December 2017, Toni renewed his contract until 2021. He scored his first professional goal the following 12 May in a 3–2 home defeat of Albacete Balompié, and contributed with 30 league appearances as his side achieved promotion to La Liga.

Toni made his debut in the main category of Spanish football on 17 August 2018, starting in a 0–0 away draw against Girona FC. His first goal in the division came on 1 December, but in a 4–2 home loss against CD Leganés.

=== Girona ===
On 1 September 2022, Toni signed a three-year contract with Girona also in the top tier. On 26 August 2024, after spending the previous campaign as a backup with only two appearances, he terminated his link.

=== Eibar ===
On 27 August 2024, Toni agreed to a two-year deal with SD Eibar in the second division.

== Career statistics ==
As of match played 14 May 2024

Appearances and goals by club, season and competition
Club	Season	League			Copa del Rey		Europe		Other		Total	
Club	Season	Division	Apps	Goals	Apps	Goals	Apps	Goals	Apps	Goals	Apps	Goals
Valladolid B	2014–15	Segunda División B	37	5	—		—		—		37	5
Valladolid B	2015–16	Segunda División B	37	2	—		—		—		37	2
Valladolid B	Total		74	7	—		—		—		74	7
Cultural Leonesa	2016–17	Segunda División B	36	5	5	0	—		4 (Note: Appearances in Segunda División B play-offs)	2	45	7
Valladolid	2017–18	Segunda División	30	2	4	0	—		4 (Note: Appearances in La Liga play-offs)	0	38	2
Valladolid	2018–19	La Liga	26	2	0	0	—		—		26	2
Valladolid	2019–20	La Liga	23	0	1	0	—		—		24	0
Valladolid	2020–21	La Liga	21	2	4	3	—		—		25	5
Valladolid	2021–22	Segunda División	37	5	3	0	—		—		40	5
Valladolid	2022–23	La Liga	2	0	0	0	—		—		2	0
Valladolid	Total		139	11	12	3	—		4	0	155	14
Girona	2022–23	La Liga	24	1	2	0	—		—		26	1
Girona	2023–24	La Liga	2	0	—		—		—		2	0
Girona	Total		26	1	2	0	0	0	0	0	28	1
Career total			274	24	19	3	0	0	8	2	301	29
