= Víctor García (footballer, born 1997) =

Spanish footballer

Personal information
- Full name: Víctor García Raja
- Date of birth: 16 September 1997 (age 29)
- Place of birth: Valencia, Spain
- Height: 1.75 m (5 ft 9 in)
- Positions: Right-back; winger

Team information
- Current team: Levante
- Number: 17

Youth career
- Torre Levante

Senior career*
Years	Team	Apps	(Gls)
2014–2018	Torre Levante	76	(18)
2018–2019	Deportivo B	36	(7)
2018	Deportivo La Coruña	0	(0)
2019–2020	Valladolid B	26	(4)
2020–2022	Valladolid	2	(1)
2020–2021	→ Sabadell (loan)	35	(0)
2021–2022	→ Deportivo La Coruña (loan)	14	(0)
2022–2024	Alcorcón	73	(4)
2024–2025	Eldense	40	(4)
2025–	Levante	21	(2)
- * Club domestic league appearances and goals as of 27 May 2026

Víctor García Raja (born 16 September 1997) is a Spanish professional footballer who plays as either a right-back or a winger for Levante UD.

== Career ==
García was born in Valencia, and represented CF Torre Levante as a youth. On 12 January 2014, aged just 17, he made his first-team debut by playing the last ten minutes in a 0–4 Tercera División away loss against UD Alzira.

García was definitely promoted to the main squad in 2016, and scored a career-best 11 goals during the 2017–18 campaign; highlights included a brace in a 3–0 home win against CD Almazora. On 12 June 2018, he signed a two-year contract with Deportivo de La Coruña and was assigned to the reserves in Segunda División B.

García made his professional debut on 12 September 2018, starting in a 1–2 away loss against Real Zaragoza, for the season's Copa del Rey. The following 26 July, he moved to another reserve team, Real Valladolid B also in the third division, on a two-year deal.

García made his main squad – and La Liga – on 7 July 2020, starting in a 1–2 away loss against Valencia CF. On 6 August, he extended his contract until 2023 and was loaned to Segunda División newcomers CE Sabadell FC for one year.

On 27 August 2021, García returned to Dépor on loan for one year, with the club now in Primera División RFEF. On 16 August of the following year, he moved to fellow league team AD Alcorcón on a permanent deal.

On 2 July 2023, after helping Alkor in their promotion to division two, García renewed his link for a further year. On 26 June of the following year, after suffering relegation, he moved to CD Eldense on a two-year deal.

On 3 July 2025, after another relegation, García agreed to a two-year contract with Levante UD in the top tier.
