= Roque Mesa =

Spanish footballer

Personal information
- Full name: Roque Mesa Quevedo
- Date of birth: 7 June 1989 (age 37)
- Place of birth: Telde, Spain
- Height: 1.72 m (5 ft 8 in)
- Position: Midfielder

Team information
- Current team: Ratchaburi
- Number: 16

Youth career
- Valdecasas
- Yoñe
- Telde
- 2005–2007: Levante

Senior career*
Years	Team	Apps	(Gls)
2005	Telde		
2007–2009	Levante B	54	(4)
2009–2010	Huracán	14	(1)
2010	Tenerife B	16	(0)
2010–2014	Las Palmas B	68	(14)
2011–2017	Las Palmas	126	(6)
2012–2013	→ Atlético Baleares (loan)	33	(3)
2017–2018	Swansea City	11	(0)
2018	→ Sevilla (loan)	7	(0)
2018–2020	Sevilla	31	(2)
2019–2020	→ Leganés (loan)	29	(1)
2020–2023	Valladolid	93	(6)
2023–2024	Sporting Gijón	30	(1)
2025	Johor Darul Ta'zim	0	(0)
2026–	Ratchaburi	2	(0)
- * Club domestic league appearances and goals as of 17:53, 24 September 2026 (UTC)

Roque Mesa Quevedo (Spanish pronunciation: [ˈroke ˈmesa]; born 7 June 1989) is a Spanish professional footballer who plays as a midfielder for Thai League 1 club Ratchaburi.

== Club career ==
=== Early career ===
Born in Telde, Gran Canaria, Canary Islands, Mesa joined Levante's youth system in 2005 after having already made his senior debut with Telde. He was promoted to the reserves in the 2007–08 season, in the Tercera División, but left the club in the middle of 2009 and signed for Huracán.

On 26 January 2010, Mesa joined Tenerife B of Segunda División B.

=== Las Palmas ===
In 2010, Mesa signed with another reserve team, Las Palmas Atlético in the fourth level, being promoted to the main squad the following year. On 8 October 2011 he appeared in his first game as a professional, starting in a 2–1 away win against Celta de Vigo in the Segunda División.

Mesa finished the campaign with 22 appearances (ten starts, 947 minutes of action) and, on 31 August of the following year, he was loaned to Atlético Baleares of the third division. Subsequently, he returned to Las Palmas with its B side, recently promoted to the third tier.

On 28 November 2013, Mesa signed a new four-year deal which ran until 2017, and was definitely promoted to the first team in July of the following year. He scored his first professional goal on 1 November 2014, netting his team's second in a 2–1 home victory over Albacete.

Mesa appeared in 35 matches and scored four goals during the season, which ended in promotion to La Liga after a 13-year absence. He made his debut in the Spanish top flight on 22 August 2015, in a 1–0 loss at Atlético Madrid.

Mesa scored his first goal in the competition on 23 September 2015, the first in a 2–0 home win against Sevilla.

=== Swansea City ===
On 6 July 2017, Mesa signed a four-year deal with Premier League team Swansea City for a fee of £11 million. His first game took place on 19 August, when he featured 67 minutes in a 4–0 home loss against Manchester United.

=== Sevilla ===
On 30 January 2018, Mesa joined Sevilla on loan for the remainder of the campaign, in a deal that included a buyout clause. In June, the move was made permanent for three years, and he scored two goals in 31 matches during the season as the club finished in sixth place.

On 13 August 2019, Mesa was loaned to Leganés also of the Spanish top division. On 5 October of the following year, he terminated his contract with the Andalusians.

=== Valladolid ===
Hours after leaving Sevilla, Mesa agreed to a three-year contract at Real Valladolid. He suffered top-flight relegation in his first season, contributing three goals from 39 appearances in the following in an immediate promotion.

=== Later career ===
Mesa signed a one-year deal with second-tier Sporting de Gijón on 5 September 2023, as a free agent. In February 2025, he moved to the Malaysia Super League with Johor Darul Ta'zim.

== Career statistics ==
As of match played 4 June 2023

Appearances and goals by club, season and competition
Club	Season	League			National Cup		League Cup		Other		Total	
Club	Season	Division	Apps	Goals	Apps	Goals	Apps	Goals	Apps	Goals	Apps	Goals
Levante B	2007–08	Segunda División B	22	1	—		—		—		22	1
Levante B	2008–09	Tercera División	32	3	—		—		—		32	3
Levante B	Total		54	4	—		—		—		54	4
Huracán	2009–10	Tercera División	14	1	—		—		—		14	1
Tenerife B	2009–10	Segunda División B	16	0	—		—		—		16	0
Las Palmas B	2010–11	Tercera División	33	6	—		—		—		33	6
Las Palmas B	2013–14	Segunda División B	35	8	—		—		2 (Note: Appearances in 2014 Segunda División B play-offs)	0	37	8
Las Palmas B	Total		68	14	—		—		2	0	70	14
Las Palmas	2011–12	Segunda División	22	0	0	0	—		—		22	0
Las Palmas	2012–13	Segunda División	0	0	0	0	—		—		0	0
Las Palmas	2013–14	Segunda División	0	0	0	0	—		—		0	0
Las Palmas	2014–15	Segunda División	31	3	4	0	—		4 (Note: Appearances in 2015 Segunda División play-offs)	1	39	4
Las Palmas	2015–16	La Liga	34	1	5	0	—		—		39	1
Las Palmas	2016–17	La Liga	35	1	1	0	—		—		36	1
Las Palmas	Total		122	5	10	0	—		4	1	136	6
Atlético Baleares (loan)	2012–13	Segunda División B	33	3	0	0	—		—		33	3
Swansea City	2017–18	Premier League	11	0	2	0	3	0	—		16	0
Sevilla (loan)	2017–18	La Liga	7	0	0	0	0	0	—		7	0
Sevilla	2018–19	La Liga	31	2	5	0	0	0	13 (Note: Twelve appearances in UEFA Europa League and one appearance in Supercopa de España)	1	49	3
Leganés	2019–20	La Liga	29	1	1	0	—		—		30	1
Valladolid	2020–21	La Liga	25	1	3	2	—		—		28	3
Valladolid	2021–22	Segunda División	39	3	3	1	—		—		42	4
Valladolid	2022–23	La Liga	29	2	2	0	—		—		31	2
Valladolid	Total		93	6	8	3	—		—		101	9
Career total			478	36	26	3	3	0	20	2	526	41
