= Jawad El Yamiq =

Moroccan footballer (born 1992)

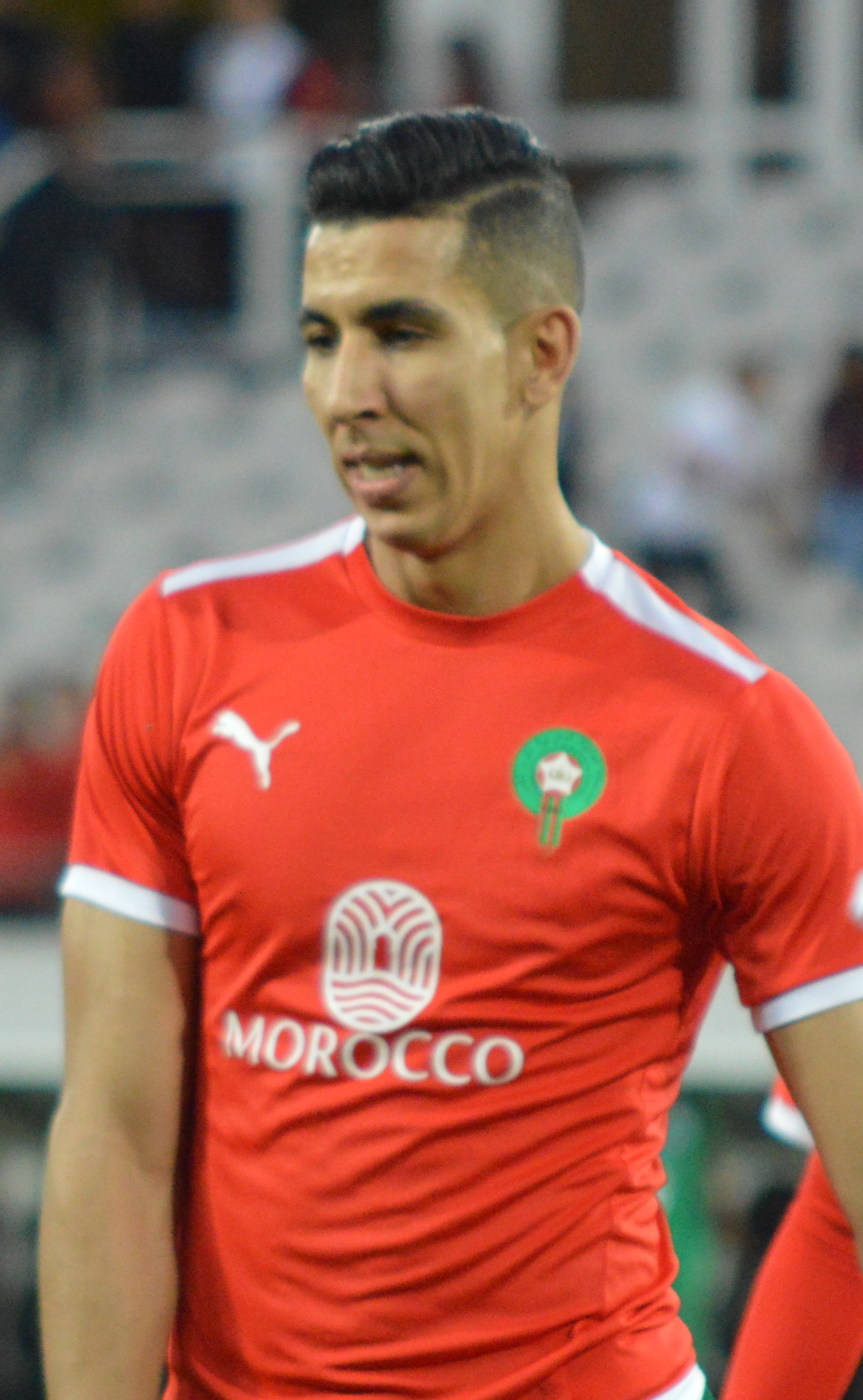
- El Yamiq in 2023

Personal information
- Full name: Jawad El Yamiq
- Date of birth: 29 February 1992 (age 34)
- Place of birth: Khouribga, Morocco
- Height: 1.93 m (6 ft 4 in)
- Position: Centre-back

Team information
- Current team: Eyüpspor
- Number: 5

Youth career
- Olympique Khouribga

Senior career*
Years	Team	Apps	(Gls)
2012–2016	Olympique Khouribga	66	(4)
2016–2017	Raja CA	34	(2)
2018–2020	Genoa	7	(0)
2018–2019	→ Perugia (loan)	22	(1)
2020	→ Zaragoza (loan)	12	(0)
2020–2023	Valladolid	69	(3)
2023–2025	Al-Wehda	49	(5)
2025–2026	Al-Najma	6	(0)
2026	Zaragoza	12	(1)
2026–	Eyüpspor	6	(0)

International career^{‡}
2015–2018	Morocco A'	9	(1)
2017–	Morocco	35	(4)
Medal record
Men's football
Representing Morocco
Africa Cup of Nations
Winner	2025 Morocco
African Nations Championship
Winner	2018 Morocco
- * Club domestic league appearances and goals as of 17 October 2026 ‡ National team caps and goals as of 9 October 2025

Jawad El Yamiq (Arabic: جواد الياميق, romanized: Jawād al-Yāmīq; born 29 February 1992) is a Moroccan professional footballer who plays as a centre-back for Turkish Süper Lig club Eyüpspor and the Morocco national team. He began his professional career playing for Olympique Khouribga.

A full international for Morocco since 2017, El Yamiq represented the nation at the 2022 FIFA World Cup and the 2018 African Nations Championship.

== Club career ==
=== Olympique Khouribga ===
In the 2014–15 Botola, El Yamiq's Olympique Khouribga finished as runners-up to Wydad AC and won the Moroccan Throne Cup by beating FUS Rabat in the final.

=== Raja CA ===
In the summer of 2016, 25-year-old El Yamiq signed a contract with Raja Casablanca for four years. He scored his first goal for the team in a 5–1 victory against Chabab Atlas Khénifra. He won the 2017 Throne cup against Difaâ Hassani El Jadidi.

=== Genoa ===
On 28 January 2018, Jawad signed with the Italian team Genoa. He was loaned to Serie B team Perugia Calcio.

==== Loan to Zaragoza ====
On 29 January 2020, he joined Zaragoza on loan until the end of the 2019–20 season. He made his first appearance for the team against Cádiz.

=== Valladolid ===
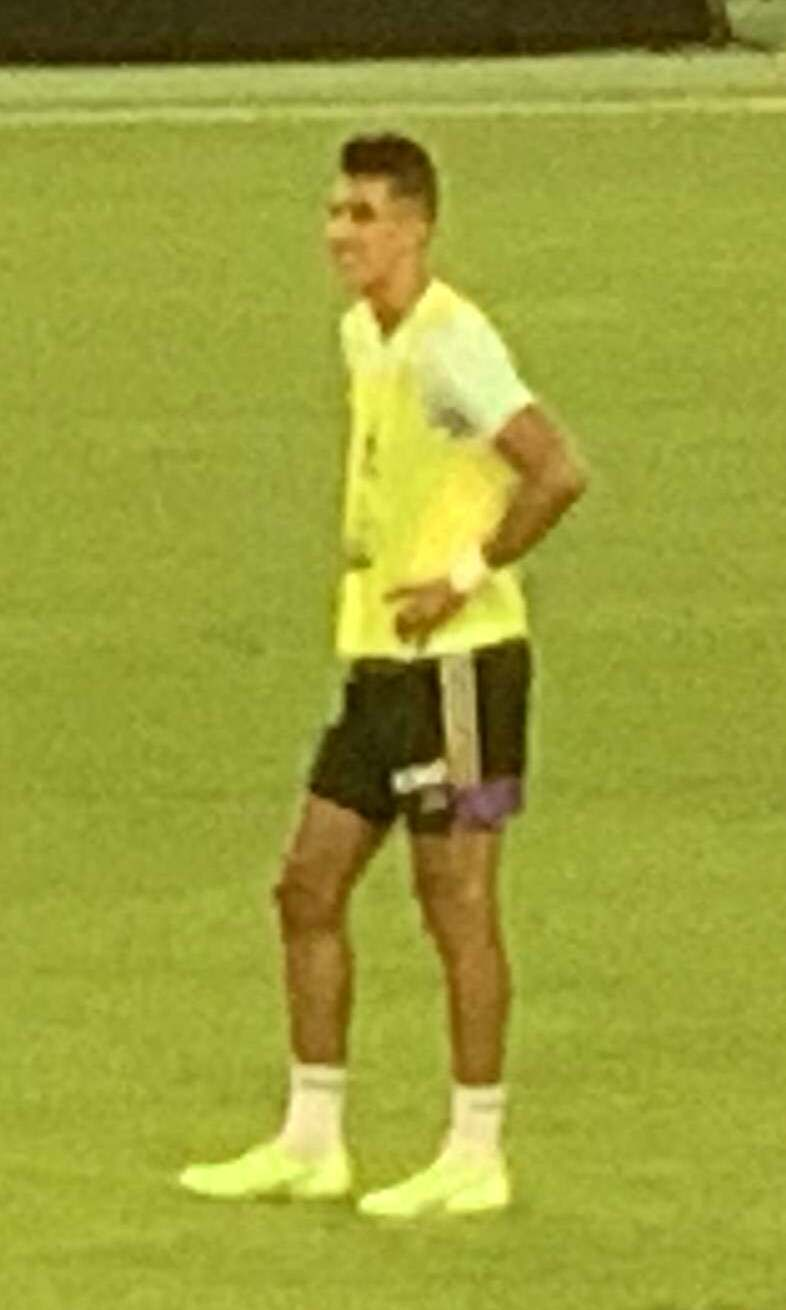
El Yamiq warming as a Valladolid player in 2022

On 24 September 2020, El Yamiq signed a four-year contract with Real Valladolid. He made his debut against Real Madrid. On 31 November 2021, he scored his first goal for the club in a 2–0 victory against SD Eibar.

=== Saudi Arabia ===
On 15 August 2023, after Valladolid's relegation, El Yamiq moved to Saudi Pro League side Al-Wehda. He was set to play with the No. 5 under the leadership of trainer Georgios Donis. 3 days later, he made his debut for the club, coming on in the 67th minute and scoring an own goal against Al Shabab FC but ended up winning the match 3–1.

On 17 August 2025, El Yamiq joined newly promoted Pro League side Al-Najma following Al-Wehda's relegation to the FDL.

=== Zaragoza return ===
On 2 February 2026, El Yamiq returned to Zaragoza after signing a six-month contract.

== International career ==
El Yamiq represented Morocco in the 2018 African Nations Championship, helping his country to achieve their first such title.

On 10 November 2022, he was named in Morocco's 26-man squad for the 2022 FIFA World Cup in Qatar. El Yamiq made headlines after being seen celebrating Morocco 2–1 victory against Canada by raising the Palestinian flag.

On 11 December 2025, El Yamiq was called up to the Morocco squad for the 2025 Africa Cup of Nations.

== Personal life ==
On 9 September 2023, El Yamiq along with his national teammates donated their blood for the needy affected by the 2023 Marrakesh-Safi earthquake.

== Career statistics ==
Scores and results list Morocco's goal tally first, score column indicates score after each El Yamiq goal.

List of international goals scored by Jawad El Yamiq
No.	Date	Venue	Opponent	Score	Result	Competition
1	18 August 2017	Prince Moulay Abdellah Stadium, Rabat, Morocco	Egypt	1–0	3–1	2018 African Nations Championship qualification
2	11 October 2019	Honneur Stadium, Oujda, Morocco	Libya	1–0	1–1	Friendly
3	8 June 2021	Prince Moulay Abdellah Stadium, Rabat, Morocco	Ghana	1–0	1–0	Friendly
4	9 October 2025	Prince Moulay Abdellah Stadium, Rabat, Morocco	Bahrain	1–0	1–0	Friendly

== Honours ==
Olympique Khouribga

- Moroccan Throne Cup: 2015

Raja CA

- Moroccan Throne Cup: 2017

Morocco A'

- African Nations Championship: 2018

Morocco

- Africa Cup of Nations: 2025

Orders

- Order of the Throne: 2022
