= Samu Pérez =

Spanish footballer

Personal information
- Full name: Samuel Pérez Fariña
- Date of birth: 26 April 1997 (age 29)
- Place of birth: Tegueste, Spain
- Height: 1.79 m (5 ft 10 in)
- Position: Goalkeeper

Team information
- Current team: Antequera
- Number: 1

Youth career
- Juventud Laguna
- 2014–2016: Sevilla

Senior career*
Years	Team	Apps	(Gls)
2014–2018	Sevilla C	65	(0)
2018	Sevilla B	1	(0)
2018–2021	Valladolid B	53	(0)
2020–2021	Valladolid	1	(0)
2022	San Fernando	15	(0)
2022–2023	Guadalajara	24	(0)
2023–2025	Atlético Sanluqueño	70	(0)
2025–	Antequera	10	(0)
- * Club domestic league appearances and goals as of 10 June 2026

Samuel "Samu" Pérez Fariña (born 26 April 1997) is a Spanish professional footballer who plays for Primera Federación club Antequera as a goalkeeper.

== Club career ==
Born in Tegueste, Tenerife, Canary Islands, Pérez joined Sevilla FC's youth setup in 2014 from Juventud Laguna CF. He made his senior debut with the C-team on 17 September of that year, starting in a 0–2 Tercera División home loss against CD Gerena.

Pérez subsequently became a regular starter for Sevilla C in the following campaigns, and on 1 June 2018 he made his professional debut with the reserves by starting in a 1–2 away loss against Lorca FC in the Segunda División. On 5 July, he moved to another reserve team, Real Valladolid B of the Segunda División B.

Pérez made his first-team – and La Liga – debut on 16 July 2020, coming on as a second-half substitute for José Antonio Caro in a 1–3 away loss against SD Eibar.
