= Álvaro Aguado =

Spanish footballer (born 1996)

Personal information
- Full name: Álvaro Aguado Méndez
- Date of birth: 1 May 1996 (age 30)
- Place of birth: Jaén, Spain
- Height: 1.75 m (5 ft 9 in)
- Position: Central midfielder

Youth career
- Maristas de Jaén
- Jaén
- 2012–2014: Villarreal
- 2014–2015: Levante

Senior career*
Years	Team	Apps	(Gls)
2015–2016	Ontinyent	15	(0)
2016–2017	Jaén	19	(1)
2017–2018	Córdoba B	19	(3)
2017–2019	Córdoba	33	(2)
2019–2023	Valladolid	75	(5)
2019	→ Córdoba (loan)	8	(0)
2020	→ Numancia (loan)	8	(0)
2020–2021	→ Fuenlabrada (loan)	12	(0)
2023–2025	Espanyol	48	(1)
- * Club domestic league appearances and goals as of 27 May 2025

Álvaro Aguado Méndez (born 1 May 1996) is a Spanish professional footballer who plays as a central midfielder.

== Career ==
=== Early career ===
Born in Jaén, Andalusia, Aguado mainly represented Villarreal CF and Levante UD as a youth. On 27 August 2015, he signed a one-year deal with Tercera División side Ontinyent CF.

Aguado made his senior debut on 15 November 2015, starting in a 4–1 home routing of CF Borriol. The following 26 July he moved to Segunda División B side Real Jaén, club he already represented as a youth.

=== Córdoba ===
On 15 July 2017, after suffering relegation, Aguado signed for Córdoba CF and was immediately assigned to the reserves also in the third division. He made his first team debut on 20 December, coming on as a second-half substitute for Carlos Caballero in a 5–0 home thrashing of CF Reus Deportiu in the Segunda División.

Aguado scored his first professional goal on 2 June 2018, netting the last in a 3–0 home defeat of Sporting de Gijón. On 2 October, he extended his contract until 2022.

=== Valladolid ===
On 25 January 2019, Aguado signed a four-and-a-half-year contract with La Liga side Real Valladolid, being immediately loaned back to Córdoba until the end of the season. Returning to the Blanquivioletas for the 2019–20 campaign, he made his debut for the club on 18 December by starting and scoring a brace in a 3–0 Copa del Rey away defeat of Tolosa CF.

On 22 January 2020, after making no league appearances for Valladolid, Aguado was loaned to second division side CD Numancia until June. On 1 October, he moved to fellow league team CF Fuenlabrada also in a temporary deal.

Aguado featured rarely at Fuenla before returning to Valladolid in July 2021, where he became a regular starter under manager Pacheta as the club achieved promotion to the top tier. He made his debut in the division on 13 August 2022, starting in a 3–0 home loss to Villarreal CF.

Aguado scored his first goal in the main category of Spanish football on 5 March 2023, netting his team's second in a 2–1 home win over RCD Espanyol. He also featured regularly as Pucela suffered immediate relegation, and left the club in June 2023.

=== Espanyol ===
On 11 September 2023, free agent Aguado signed a two-year contract with Espanyol in the second division.
