= Rubén Alcaraz =

Spanish footballer (born 1991)

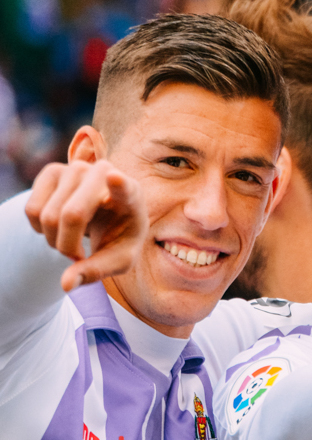
- Alcaraz with Valladolid in 2019

Personal information
- Full name: Rubén Alcaraz Jiménez
- Date of birth: 1 May 1991 (age 35)
- Place of birth: Barcelona, Spain
- Height: 1.80 m (5 ft 11 in)
- Position: Central midfielder

Team information
- Current team: Granada
- Number: 4

Youth career
- 1997–2001: Bon Pastor
- 2001–2004: Barcelona
- 2004–2008: Espanyol
- 2008–2010: Damm

Senior career*
Years	Team	Apps	(Gls)
2010	Horta	7	(2)
2010–2011	Gramenet B	24	(5)
2011–2012	Gramenet	38	(3)
2012–2014	Prat	73	(5)
2014–2015	Hospitalet	34	(10)
2015–2018	Girona	47	(8)
2017–2018	→ Almería (loan)	41	(9)
2018–2022	Valladolid	105	(7)
2022	→ Cádiz (loan)	14	(2)
2022–2025	Cádiz	96	(9)
2025–	Granada	33	(4)

International career
2022	Catalonia	1	(0)
- * Club domestic league appearances and goals as of 20 June 2025

Rubén Alcaraz Jiménez (born 1 May 1991) is a Spanish professional footballer who plays as a central midfielder for Granada.

== Career ==
Born in Barcelona, Catalonia, Alcaraz graduated with CF Damm's youth setup, after a stint at FC Barcelona and RCD Espanyol. He made his senior debuts with UA Horta in 2010, representing the side in the regional leagues.

In the 2010 summer, Alcaraz joined UDA Gramenet, being assigned to the reserves also in the lower levels. After making his debuts in Segunda División B and eventually suffering relegation, he was definitely promoted to the main squad in June 2011.

On 28 June 2012, Alcaraz signed for AE Prat in the third level. On 11 July 2014, he moved to fellow league team CE L'Hospitalet, and scored ten goals in 34 appearances during his first and only season at the club.

On 17 June 2015, Alcaraz signed a two-year deal with Segunda División side Girona FC. He made his professional debut on 24 August, starting in a 1–0 away win against Bilbao Athletic.

Alcaraz scored his first goal in the second tier on 1 November 2015, netting the game's only in an away success over CA Osasuna. On 21 August of the following year, he scored a brace in a 3–3 draw at Sevilla Atlético.

On 11 July 2017, after achieving promotion to La Liga, Alcaraz renewed his contract until 2020 and was immediately loaned to UD Almería for one year. He was the club's top goalscorer with nine goals, playing a key part as the club narrowly avoided relegation.

On 3 August 2018, Alcaraz signed a four-year contract with Real Valladolid, newly-promoted to the main category. He made his debut in the main category of Spanish football on 17 August, starting in a 0–0 away draw against former side Girona.

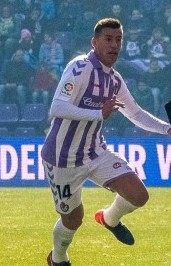
Alcaraz playing for Valladolid in 2019

Alcaraz scored his first goal in the top tier on 7 October 2018, netting the game's only in a 1–0 home success over SD Huesca. He quickly established himself as a regular starter, but suffered team relegation in 2021.

On 20 January 2022, Alcaraz was loaned to Cádiz CF in the first division, until June. On 1 June, the club exercised his buyout clause, and he signed a permanent two-year contract.

On 31 August 2025, Alcaraz terminated his link with the Yellow Submarine.
