= Waldo Rubio =

Spanish footballer

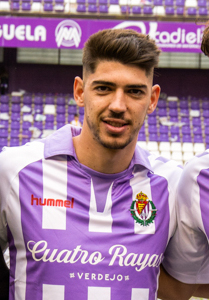
- Rubio with Valladolid in 2019

Personal information
- Full name: Waldo Rubio Marín
- Date of birth: 17 August 1995 (age 31)
- Place of birth: Badajoz, Spain
- Height: 1.81 m (5 ft 11 in)
- Position: Winger

Team information
- Current team: Eldense

Youth career
- 2000–2013: Flecha Negra
- 2013–2014: Recreativo

Senior career*
Years	Team	Apps	(Gls)
2014–2016	Recreativo B	28	(3)
2015–2017	Recreativo	43	(1)
2017–2018	Córdoba B	29	(7)
2018	Córdoba	2	(0)
2018–2019	Valladolid B	24	(6)
2019–2022	Valladolid	39	(2)
2021–2022	→ Cercle Brugge (loan)	11	(2)
2022–2025	Tenerife	90	(9)
2025–2026	AEK Larnaca	22	(2)
2026–	Eldense	02	(0)
- * Club domestic league appearances and goals as of 14 June 2026

Waldo Rubio Marín (born 17 August 1995) is a Spanish professional footballer who plays as a left winger for CD Eldense.

== Club career ==
Born in Badajoz, Extremadura, Rubio joined Recreativo de Huelva's youth setup in May 2013, from CP Flecha Negra. On 2 March of the following year he made his senior debut with the reserves, coming on as a second-half substitute in a 0–1 Tercera División home loss against Conil CF.

Rubio made his first-team debut on 25 October 2015, playing the last 27 minutes in a 1–1 home draw against FC Cartagena in the Segunda División B. He quickly established himself in the main squad, and scored his first goal the following 28 February in a 2–2 home draw against Real Jaén.

On 11 July 2017, free agent Rubio signed for Córdoba CF and was immediately assigned to the B-team also in the third division. He made his professional debut on 14 January of the following year, replacing Miguel Loureiro in a 0–2 away loss against Cádiz CF in the Segunda División.

On 27 July 2018 Rubio moved to another reserve team, Real Valladolid B still in the third division. The following 12 March, he extended his contract until 2022, and late in the month, he replaced injured Pablo Hervías in the main squad.

Rubio made his La Liga debut on 4 April 2019, starting in a 0–1 loss at CD Leganés. He scored his first goal in the category on 5 May, netting the game's only in a home success over Athletic Bilbao.

On 2 July 2021, Rubio signed a one-year loan deal with Belgian First Division A club Cercle Brugge with an option to buy. The following 27 January, his loan was cut short after he suffered a quadriceps injury.

On 19 August 2022, Rubio signed a two-year contract with CD Tenerife in the second tier. In June 2025, he agreed to join Cypriot First Division side AEK Larnaca FC on a two-year deal.

On 30 August 2026, Rubio returned to Spain and its second division, signing a one-year contract with CD Eldense.
