= 2018 Segunda División play-offs =

Segunda División play-offs
- Season: 2017–18
- Promoted: Valladolid
- Matches played: 6
- Goals scored: 17 (2.83 per match)

The 2017–18 Segunda División play-offs were played from June 6 to June 17, 2018 and determined the third team which would be promoted to the top division. Teams placed between 3rd and 6th position excluding reserve teams took part in the promotion play-offs.

Valladolid achieved promotion.

== Regulations ==
The regulations were the same as the previous season: in the semi-finals, the fifth-placed team faced the fourth-placed team, while the sixth-placed team faced the third. Each tie was played over two legs, with the team lower in the table hosting the first leg.

The team that scored more goals on aggregate over the two legs advanced to the next round. If the aggregate score was level, the away goals rule was applied (i.e., the team that scored more goals away from home over the two legs advanced). If away goals were also equal, then thirty minutes of extra time would be played. The away goals rule would again be applied after extra time (i.e., if there were goals scored during extra time and the aggregate score was still level, the visiting team advanced by virtue of more away goals scored). If no goals were scored during extra time, the winner would be the best positioned team in the regular season.

== Road to the play-offs ==
Pos	Team	Pld	W	D	L	GF	GA	GD	Pts	Promotion, qualification or relegation
3	Zaragoza	42	20	11	11	57	44	+13	71 (Note: Zaragoza finished ahead of Sporting Gijón on head-to-head points: Sporting Gijón 0–1 Zaragoza, Zaragoza 2–1 Sporting Gijón)	Qualification for promotion play-offs
4	Sporting Gijón	42	21	8	13	60	40	+20	71	Qualification for promotion play-offs
5	Valladolid (O, P)	42	19	10	13	69	55	+14	67	Qualification for promotion play-offs
6	Numancia	42	18	11	13	52	41	+11	65 (Note: Numancia finished ahead of Oviedo on head-to-head goal difference: Oviedo 3–1 Numancia, Numancia 3–0 Oviedo)	Qualification for promotion play-offs

Source: La Liga
Rules for classification: 1) points; 2) head-to-head points; 3) head-to-head goal difference; 4) goal difference; 5) number of goals scored
(O) Play-off winners; (P) Promoted

== Bracket ==
Semi-finals
Numancia	1	2	3
Zaragoza	1	1	2
Valladolid	3	2	5
Sporting Gijón	1	1	2

Final
Numancia	0	1	1
Valladolid	3	1	4

=== Semi-finals ===
Team 1	Agg.	Team 2	1st leg	2nd leg
Numancia	3–2	Zaragoza	1–1	2–1
Valladolid	5–2	Sporting Gijón	3–1	2–1

==== First legs ====
6 June 2018
20:30 (CEST)

Numancia	1–1	Zaragoza
Guillermo 5'	Report	Zapater 4'

Los Pajaritos, Soria
Attendance: 7,646
Referee: Aitor Gorostegui Fernández-Ortega

Numancia	Zaragoza

GK	13	(Spain) Aitor Fernández
LB	2	(Spain) Saúl
CB	8	(Spain) Alberto Escassi
CB	16	(Spain) Carlos	(yellow card) 28'
RB	15	(Spain) Markel Etxeberria
CM	6	(Spain) Iñigo Pérez
CM	24	(Senegal) Pape Diamanka
LW	21	(Spain) Marc Mateu
AM	12	(Spain) Pere Milla		(substituted off) 82'
RW	17	(Spain) Unai Medina		(substituted off) 73'
CF	19	(Spain) Guillermo		(substituted off) 70'
Substitutions:
GK	30	(Spain) Gaizka Campos
DF	5	(Spain) Dani Calvo
FW	9	(Spain) Higinio		(substituted in) 70'
MF	10	(Venezuela) Julio Álvarez		(substituted in) 82'
FW	11	(Spain) Nacho
MF	22	(Spain) Pablo Larrea
MF	23	(Spain) Dani Nieto		(substituted in) 73'
Manager:
(Spain) Jagoba Arrasate

GK	1	(Argentina) Cristian Álvarez
LB	17	(Spain) Daniel Lasure
CB	5	(Portugal) Diogo Verdasca
CB	6	(Switzerland) Simone Grippo
RB	22	(Spain) Julián Delmás
CM	16	(Spain) Íñigo Eguaras
LW	21	(Spain) Alberto Zapater	(yellow card) 81'
RW	10	(Spain) Javi Ros		(substituted off) 62'
AM	19	(Georgia (country)) Giorgi Papunashvili	(yellow card) 41'	(substituted off) 71'
LF	8	(Spain) Jorge Pombo	(yellow card) 35'	(substituted off) 86'
RF	9	(Spain) Borja Iglesias
Substitutions:
GK	13	(Spain) Álvaro Ratón
DF	2	(Spain) Alberto Benito
MF	14	(Spain) Aleix Febas		(substituted in) 62'
MF	15	(Switzerland) Oliver Buff		(substituted in) 71'
FW	23	(Spain) Gaizka Toquero		(substituted in) 86'
DF	24	(Spain) Mikel González
MF	33	(Spain) Pep Biel
Manager:
(Spain) Natxo González

7 June 2018
20:30 (CEST)

Valladolid	3–1	Sporting Gijón
Calero 29'; Hervías 35'; Calavera 37' (o.g.)	Report	Jony 70'

José Zorrilla, Valladolid
Attendance: 22,520
Referee: Isidro Díaz de Mera Escuderos

Valladolid	Sporting Gijón

GK	1	(Spain) Jordi Masip
LB	22	(Spain) Nacho
CB	4	(Spain) Kiko Olivas
CB	5	(Spain) Fernando Calero
RB	17	(Spain) Javi Moyano
CM	8	(Spain) Borja Fernández	(yellow card) 62'
CM	35	(Spain) Anuar		(substituted off) 90'
LW	19	(Spain) Toni Villa		(substituted off) 74'
AM	23	(Spain) Óscar Plano
RW	11	(Spain) Pablo Hervías		(substituted off) 79'
CF	9	(Spain) Jaime Mata	(yellow card) 83'
Substitutions:
GK	13	(Spain) Isaac Becerra
DF	3	(Spain) Borja Herrera
FW	7	(Greece) Giannis Gianniotas		(substituted in) 79'
MF	10	(Spain) Javier Ontiveros	(yellow card) 80'	(substituted in) 74'
DF	14	(Spain) Toni Martínez
DF	18	(Spain) Antoñito
MF	44	(Spain) Javi Pérez		(substituted in) 90'
Manager:
(Spain) Sergio González

GK	13	(Spain) Diego Mariño
LB	15	(Spain) Roberto Canella
CB	5	(Italy) Federico Barba
CB	29	(Spain) Juan Rodríguez
RB	25	(Spain) Jordi Calavera	(yellow card) 90+1'
CM	4	(Spain) Álex Bergantiños
CM	6	(Spain) Sergio Álvarez	(yellow card) 28'
LW	16	(Spain) Jony
AM	14	(Spain) Rubén García		(substituted off) 86'
RW	10	(Spain) Carlos Carmona	(yellow card) 34'
CF	7	(Uruguay) Michael Santos
Substitutions:
GK	1	(Spain) Óscar Whalley
FW	9	(Spain) Carlos Castro
DF	11	(Spain) Alberto Lora
MF	17	(Spain) Álex López		(substituted in) 86'
DF	18	(Spain) Isma López
DF	20	(Colombia) Juan Sebastián Quintero
MF	22	(Spain) Pablo Pérez
Manager:
(Spain) José Ramón Rodríguez (Note: Sporting Gijón manager Rubén Baraja was given a four-match touchline ban following the home match against Barcelona B. Assistant manager José Ramón Rodríguez filled in as manager for this game, the last one of the sanction.)

==== Second legs ====
9 June 2018
18:00 (CEST)

Zaragoza	1–2	Numancia
González 79'	Report	Iñigo Pérez 64'; Diamanka 90+1'

La Romareda, Zaragoza
Attendance: 29,741
Referee: Adrián Cordero Vega

Zaragoza	Numancia

GK	1	(Argentina) Cristian Álvarez
LB	17	(Spain) Daniel Lasure
DF	24	(Spain) Mikel González	(yellow card) 72'
CB	6	(Switzerland) Simone Grippo
RB	2	(Spain) Alberto Benito
CM	16	(Spain) Íñigo Eguaras
LW	21	(Spain) Alberto Zapater	(yellow card) 82'
RW	14	(Spain) Aleix Febas		(substituted off) 83'
AM	19	(Georgia (country)) Giorgi Papunashvili
LF	9	(Spain) Borja Iglesias
RF	23	(Spain) Gaizka Toquero		(substituted off) 63'
Substitutions:
GK	13	(Spain) Álvaro Ratón
DF	4	(Brazil) Bruno Perone
FW	8	(Spain) Jorge Pombo		(substituted in) 63'
MF	10	(Spain) Javi Ros
MF	15	(Switzerland) Oliver Buff		(substituted in) 83'
DF	22	(Spain) Julián Delmás
MF	33	(Spain) Pep Biel
Manager:
(Spain) Natxo González

GK	13	(Spain) Aitor Fernández	(yellow card) 80'
LB	2	(Spain) Saúl
CB	4	(Spain) Unai Elgezabal	(yellow card) 41'
CB	16	(Spain) Carlos
RB	15	(Spain) Markel Etxeberria
CM	24	(Senegal) Pape Diamanka
CM	8	(Spain) Alberto Escassi	(yellow card) 38'
LW	21	(Spain) Marc Mateu		(substituted off) 82'
AM	6	(Spain) Iñigo Pérez
RW	17	(Spain) Unai Medina		(substituted off) 8'
CF	9	(Spain) Higinio		(substituted off) 61'
Substitutions:
GK	30	(Spain) Gaizka Campos
DF	3	(Spain) Adrián Ripa
DF	5	(Spain) Dani Calvo
MF	10	(Venezuela) Julio Álvarez
FW	11	(Spain) Nacho		(substituted in) 8'
FW	12	(Spain) Pere Milla		(substituted in) 82'
FW	19	(Spain) Guillermo		(substituted in) 61'
Manager:
(Spain) Jagoba Arrasate

10 June 2018
20:30 (CEST)

Sporting Gijón	1–2	Valladolid
Carmona 68' (pen.)	Report	Mata 23'; Óscar Plano 31'

El Molinón, Gijón
Attendance: 23,886
Referee: Gorka Sagués Oscoz

Sporting Gijón	Valladolid

GK	13	(Spain) Diego Mariño
LB	18	(Spain) Isma López
CB	5	(Italy) Federico Barba
CB	24	(Spain) Álex Pérez
RB	11	(Spain) Alberto Lora
CM	4	(Spain) Álex Bergantiños	(yellow card) 70'	(substituted off) 79'
CM	6	(Spain) Sergio Álvarez
LW	16	(Spain) Jony
AM	14	(Spain) Rubén García		(substituted off) 63'
RW	10	(Spain) Carlos Carmona		(substituted off) 74'
CF	7	(Uruguay) Michael Santos
Substitutions:
GK	1	(Spain) Óscar Whalley
DF	15	(Spain) Roberto Canella
MF	17	(Spain) Álex López	(yellow card) 82'	(substituted in) 79'
FW	19	(Spain) Nano		(substituted in) 63'
MF	22	(Spain) Pablo Pérez		(substituted in) 74'
DF	25	(Spain) Jordi Calavera
DF	29	(Spain) Juan Rodríguez
Manager:
(Spain) Rubén Baraja

GK	1	(Spain) Jordi Masip
LB	22	(Spain) Nacho
CB	4	(Spain) Kiko Olivas
CB	5	(Spain) Fernando Calero
RB	17	(Spain) Javi Moyano
CM	8	(Spain) Borja Fernández
CM	21	(Spain) Míchel	(substituted off) 69'
LW	19	(Spain) Toni Villa
AM	23	(Spain) Óscar Plano
RW	11	(Spain) Pablo Hervías	(substituted off) 77'
CF	9	(Spain) Jaime Mata	(substituted off) 82'
Substitutions:
GK	13	(Spain) Isaac Becerra
DF	3	(Spain) Borja Herrera
FW	7	(Greece) Giannis Gianniotas
MF	10	(Spain) Javier Ontiveros
DF	14	(Spain) Toni Martínez	(substituted in) 82'
DF	18	(Spain) Antoñito	(substituted in) 77'
CM	35	(Spain) Anuar	(substituted in) 69'
Manager:
(Spain) Sergio González

=== Final ===
Team 1	Agg.	Team 2	1st leg	2nd leg
Numancia	1–4	Valladolid	0–3	1–1

==== First leg ====
13 June 2018
20:30 (CEST)

Numancia	0–3	Valladolid
	Report	Olivas 36'; Hervías 58'; Óscar Plano 67'

Los Pajaritos, Soria
Attendance: 8,068
Referee: Eduardo Prieto Iglesias

Numancia	Valladolid

GK	13	(Spain) Aitor Fernández
LB	2	(Spain) Saúl
CB	8	(Spain) Alberto Escassi
CB	16	(Spain) Carlos	(yellow card) 50'
RB	15	(Spain) Markel Etxeberria
CM	6	(Spain) Iñigo Pérez
CM	24	(Senegal) Pape Diamanka
LW	21	(Spain) Marc Mateu		(substituted off) 59'
AM	12	(Spain) Pere Milla		(substituted off) 74'
RW	20	(Spain) Pablo Valcarce	(yellow card) 20'	(substituted off) 45'
CF	19	(Spain) Guillermo
Substitutions:
GK	30	(Spain) Gaizka Campos
MF	3	(Spain) Adrián Ripa
DF	5	(Spain) Dani Calvo
FW	9	(Spain) Higinio		(substituted in) 59'
MF	10	(Venezuela) Julio Álvarez		(substituted in) 74'
FW	11	(Spain) Nacho		(substituted in) 45'
MF	22	(Spain) Pablo Larrea
Manager:
(Spain) Jagoba Arrasate

GK	1	(Spain) Jordi Masip
LB	22	(Spain) Nacho
CB	4	(Spain) Kiko Olivas
CB	5	(Spain) Fernando Calero
RB	17	(Spain) Javi Moyano		(substituted off) 56'
LW	7	(Greece) Giannis Gianniotas		(substituted off) 79'
CM	8	(Spain) Borja Fernández
CM	35	(Spain) Anuar
RW	18	(Spain) Antoñito
LF	23	(Spain) Óscar Plano		(substituted off) 89'
RF	9	(Spain) Jaime Mata	(yellow card) 84'
Substitutions:
GK	13	(Spain) Isaac Becerra
DF	3	(Spain) Borja Herrera
MF	10	(Spain) Javier Ontiveros		(substituted in) 79'
MF	11	(Spain) Pablo Hervías		(substituted in) 56'
DF	14	(Spain) Toni Martínez
MF	19	(Spain) Toni Villa	(yellow card) 90+3'	(substituted in) 89'
MF	44	(Spain) Javi Pérez
Manager:
(Spain) Sergio González

==== Second leg ====
16 June 2018
20:30 (CEST)

Valladolid	1–1	Numancia
Mata 90+3'	Report	Del Moral 87'

José Zorrilla, Valladolid
Attendance: 24,211
Referee: Guillermo Cuadra Fernández

Valladolid	Numancia

GK	1	(Spain) Jordi Masip		(substituted off) 89'
LB	22	(Spain) Nacho
CB	4	(Spain) Kiko Olivas
CB	5	(Spain) Fernando Calero
RB	18	(Spain) Antoñito
CM	8	(Spain) Borja Fernández
CM	35	(Spain) Anuar
LW	19	(Spain) Toni Villa		(substituted off) 76'
AM	23	(Spain) Óscar Plano
RW	11	(Spain) Pablo Hervías	(yellow card) 74'	(substituted off) 81'
CF	9	(Spain) Jaime Mata
Substitutions:
GK	13	(Spain) Isaac Becerra		(substituted in) 89'
DF	3	(Spain) Borja Herrera
FW	7	(Greece) Giannis Gianniotas		(substituted in) 76'
MF	10	(Spain) Javier Ontiveros		(substituted in) 81'
DF	14	(Spain) Toni Martínez
DF	17	(Spain) Javi Moyano
MF	44	(Spain) Javi Pérez
Manager:
(Spain) Sergio González

GK	13	(Spain) Aitor Fernández
LB	3	(Spain) Adrián Ripa
CB	4	(Spain) Unai Elgezabal	(yellow card) 42'
CB	5	(Spain) Dani Calvo
RB	15	(Spain) Markel Etxeberria	(yellow card) 28'
CM	6	(Spain) Iñigo Pérez
CM	8	(Spain) Alberto Escassi
LW	12	(Spain) Pere Milla		(substituted off) 46'
AM	24	(Senegal) Pape Diamanka		(substituted off) 46'
RW	11	(Spain) Nacho
CF	9	(Spain) Higinio		(substituted off) 46'
Substitutions:
GK	30	(Spain) Gaizka Campos
DF	2	(Spain) Saúl
FW	7	(Spain) Manu del Moral		(substituted in) 46'
MF	10	(Venezuela) Julio Álvarez
FW	19	(Spain) Guillermo		(substituted in) 46'
MF	21	(Spain) Marc Mateu		(substituted in) 46'
MF	22	(Spain) Pablo Larrea
Manager:
(Spain) Jagoba Arrasate

Promoted to La Liga
Valladolid
(4 years later)
