= 2017–18 CD Numancia season =

CD Numancia
2017–18 season
- Chairman: Francisco Rubio
- Manager: Jagoba Arrasate
- Stadium: Los Pajaritos
- Segunda División: -
Home colours

During the 2017–18 season, CD Numancia participated in the Spanish 2017–18 Segunda División, and the Copa del Rey.

== Squad ==
As of 19 August 2017

Note: Flags indicate national team as defined under FIFA eligibility rules; some limited exceptions apply. Players may hold more than one non-FIFA nationality.

No.	Pos.	Nation	Player
1	GK	MAR	Munir
3	DF	ESP	Adrián Ripa (2nd captain)
4	DF	ESP	Unai Elgezabal (on loan from Eibar)
5	DF	ESP	Dani Calvo
6	DF	ESP	Iñigo Pérez
7	FW	ESP	Manu del Moral
8	MF	ESP	Alberto Escassi
9	FW	ESP	Higinio Marín
10	MF	VEN	Julio Álvarez (captain)
11	FW	ESP	Nacho Sánchez
12	FW	ESP	Pere Milla (on loan from Eibar)
13	GK	ESP	Aitor Fernández

No.	Pos.	Nation	Player
14	DF	ESP	Luis Valcarce
15	DF	ESP	Markel Etxeberria (on loan from Athletic Bilbao)
16	DF	ESP	Carlos Gutiérrez
17	DF	ESP	Unai Medina
18	MF	ESP	Grego Sierra
19	FW	ESP	Guillermo
20	MF	ESP	Pablo Valcarce
21	MF	ESP	Marc Mateu
22	MF	ESP	Pablo Larrea
23	FW	ESP	Dani Nieto
24	MF	SEN	Pape Maly Diamanka
30	GK	ESP	Gaizka Campos

== Transfers ==
=== In ===
Date	Player	From	Type	Fee	Ref
20 June 2017	(Spain) Higinio Marín	(Spain) Valladolid B	Transfer	Free	
27 June 2017	(Spain) Guillermo Fernández	(Spain) Elche	Transfer	Free	
29 June 2017	(Spain) Gregorio Sierra	(Spain) Valencia Mestalla	Transfer	Free	
5 July 2017	(Spain) Pablo Larrea	(Spain) Villarreal B	Transfer	Free	
6 July 2017	(Spain) Pere Milla	(Spain) Eibar	Loan	Free	
7 July 2017	(Spain) Markel Etxeberria	(Spain) Numancia	Loan	Free	

=== Out ===
Date	Player	To	Type	Fee	Ref
30 June 2017	(Spain) Kike Sola	(Spain) Athletic Bilbao	Loan return	Free	
30 June 2017	(Spain) Asier Villalibre	(Spain) Athletic Bilbao	Loan return	Free	
30 June 2017	(Spain) Eneko Capilla	(Spain) Real Sociedad	Loan return	Free	
30 June 2017	(Spain) Jairo Morillas	(Spain) Espanyol	Loan return	Free	
9 July 2017	(Spain) Pedro Orfila	(Spain) Murcia	Transfer	Free	
17 July 2017	(Spain) Ruiz de Galarreta	(Spain) Barcelona B	Transfer	€700K	
18 July 2017	(Spain) Casado	(Spain) Recreativo	Transfer	Free	
24 July 2017	(Spain) Mikel Saizar	(Spain) Burgos	Transfer	Free	
28 July 2017	(Spain) Marc Pedraza	(Spain) Mallorca	Transfer	Free	

== Competitions ==
=== Overall ===
Competition	Final position
Segunda División	-
Copa del Rey	-

=== Liga ===
==== League table ====
Pos	Team	Pld	W	D	L	GF	GA	GD	Pts	Promotion, qualification or relegation
4	Sporting Gijón	42	21	8	13	60	40	+20	71 (Note: Zaragoza finished ahead of Sporting Gijón on head-to-head points: Sporting Gijón 0–1 Zaragoza, Zaragoza 2–1 Sporting Gijón)	Qualification for promotion play-offs
5	Valladolid (O, P)	42	19	10	13	69	55	+14	67	Qualification for promotion play-offs
6	Numancia	42	18	11	13	52	41	+11	65 (Note: Numancia finished ahead of Oviedo on head-to-head goal difference: Oviedo 3–1 Numancia, Numancia 3–0 Oviedo)	Qualification for promotion play-offs
7	Oviedo	42	18	11	13	54	48	+6	65	
8	Osasuna	42	16	16	10	44	34	+10	64 (Note: Osasuna finished ahead of Cádiz on head-to-head points: Cádiz 0–2 Osasuna, Osasuna 1–0 Cádiz)	

Source: La Liga
Rules for classification: 1) points; 2) head-to-head points; 3) head-to-head goal difference; 4) goal difference; 5) number of goals scored
(O) Play-off winners; (P) Promoted

==== Matches ====
Kickoff times are in CET. Win Draw Loss

Match	Opponent	Venue	Result
1	Huesca	H	1–0
2	Rayo	A	2–2
3	Almería	H	1–0
4	Reus	A	1–0
5	Sporting	H	3–0
6	Cádiz		–
7	Albacete		–
8	Zaragoza		–
9	Barcelona B		–
10	Tenerife		–
11	Granada		–
12	Córdoba		–
13	Alcorcón		–
14	Lugo		–
15	Nàstic		–
16	Oviedo		–
17	Valladolid		–
18	Lorca		–
19	Osasuna		–
20	Sevilla At		–
21	Cultural		–

Match	Opponent	Venue	Result
22			–
23			–
24			–
25			–
26			–
27			–
28			–
29			–
30			–
31			–
32			–
33			–
34			–
35			–
36			–
37			–
38			–
39			–
40			–
41			–
42			–
