= 2016–17 CD Numancia season =

CD Numancia
2016–17 season
- Chairman: Francisco Rubio
- Manager: Jagoba Arrasate
- Stadium: Los Pajaritos
- Segunda División: 17th
Home colours

The 2016–17 season is the 72nd season in CD Numancia ’s history.

== Squad ==
Note: Flags indicate national team as defined under FIFA eligibility rules; some limited exceptions apply. Players may hold more than one non-FIFA nationality.

No.	Pos.	Nation	Player
1	GK	(Morocco) MAR	Munir
2	DF	(Spain) ESP	José Manuel Casado
3	DF	(Spain) ESP	Adrián Ripa (2nd captain)
4	MF	(Spain) ESP	Marc Pedraza (3rd captain)
6	DF	(Spain) ESP	Iñigo Pérez
7	FW	(Spain) ESP	Manu del Moral
8	MF	(Spain) ESP	Alberto Escassi
9	FW	(Spain) ESP	Asier Villalibre (on loan from Athletic Bilbao)
10	MF	(Venezuela) VEN	Julio Álvarez (captain)
11	FW	(Spain) ESP	Nacho Sánchez
12	FW	(Spain) ESP	Kike Sola (on loan from Athletic Bilbao)
13	GK	(Spain) ESP	Aitor Fernández

No.	Pos.	Nation	Player
14	DF	(Spain) ESP	Luis Valcarce
15	DF	(Spain) ESP	Dani Calvo
16	DF	(Spain) ESP	Carlos Gutiérrez
17	DF	(Spain) ESP	Unai Medina
18	FW	(Spain) ESP	Jairo Morillas (on loan from Espanyol)
19	MF	(Spain) ESP	Iñigo Ruiz de Galarreta
20	FW	(Spain) ESP	Pablo Valcarce
21	MF	(Spain) ESP	Marc Mateu
22	MF	(Spain) ESP	Pedro Orfila
23	MF	(Spain) ESP	Eneko Capilla (on loan from Real Sociedad)
24	MF	(Spain) ESP	Dani Nieto
25	GK	(Spain) ESP	Mikel Saizar

== Competitions ==
=== Overall ===
Competition	Final position
Segunda División	17th
Copa del Rey	2nd round

=== Liga ===
==== League table ====
Pos	Team	Pld	W	D	L	GF	GA	GD	Pts	Promotion, qualification or relegation
15	Almería	42	14	9	19	44	49	−5	51	
16	Zaragoza	42	12	14	16	50	52	−2	50 (Note: Zaragoza and Numancia finished ahead of Alcorcón on head-to-head points: Zaragoza 7 pts, Numancia 7 pts, Alcorcón 2 pts. Zaragoza finished ahead of Numancia on head-to-head goal difference: Numancia 2–1 Zaragoza, Zaragoza 3–0 Numancia)	
17	Numancia	42	11	17	14	40	49	−9	50	
18	Alcorcón	42	13	11	18	32	43	−11	50	
19	UCAM Murcia (R)	42	11	15	16	42	51	−9	48	Relegation to Segunda División B

Source: La Liga
Rules for classification: 1) points; 2) head-to-head points; 3) head-to-head goal difference; 4) goal difference; 5) number of goals scored
(R) Relegated
