= 2017–18 Real Valladolid season =

Real Valladolid
2017–18 season
- President: Carlos Suárez
- Head coach: Luis César Sampedro
- Stadium: José Zorrilla
- Segunda División: 5th
- Copa del Rey: Round of 32
Home colours	Away colours

The 2017–18 season was the 90th season in Real Valladolid's history.

== Squad ==
As of 3 September 2017.

Note: Flags indicate national team as defined under FIFA eligibility rules; some limited exceptions apply. Players may hold more than one non-FIFA nationality.

No.	Pos.	Nation	Player
1	GK	ESP	Jordi Masip
2	FW	ESP	Asier Villalibre (on loan from Athletic Bilbao)
3	DF	ESP	Ángel
4	DF	ESP	Kiko Olivas
5	DF	ESP	Fernando Calero
6	MF	ESP	Luismi
7	FW	GRE	Giannis Gianniotas
8	MF	ESP	Borja Fernández (2nd captain)
9	FW	ESP	Jaime Mata
10	MF	ESP	Sergio Marcos
11	MF	ESP	Pablo Hervías (on loan from Eibar)
13	GK	ESP	Isaac Becerra
14	MF	GAM	Sulayman Marreh (on loan from Watford)

No.	Pos.	Nation	Player
15	DF	ESP	Deivid
16	MF	ESP	Antonio Cotán
17	DF	ESP	Javi Moyano (Captain)
18	DF	ESP	Antoñito
19	MF	ESP	Toni
20	DF	ESP	Alberto Guitián
21	MF	ESP	Míchel
22	DF	ESP	Nacho
23	MF	ESP	Óscar Plano
24	FW	GEQ	Iban Salvador
35	MF	ESP	Anuar
42	MF	ESP	David Mayoral
—	FW	ESP	Alfredo Ortuño

== Transfers ==
=== In ===
Date	Player	From	Type	Fee	Ref
30 June 2017	(Spain) Luismi	(Spain) Gimnàstic	Loan return	Free	
30 June 2017	(Spain) Víctor Pérez	(Spain) Alcorcón	Loan return	Free	
30 June 2017	(Spain) Samuel Llorca	(Spain) Racing Santander	Loan return	Free	
30 June 2017	(Spain) Iban Salvador	(Spain) UCAM Murcia	Loan return	Free	
1 July 2017	(Spain) Anuar	(Spain) Valladolid B	Promoted		
1 July 2017	(Spain) Toni Villa	(Spain) Cultural Leonesa	Transfer	€50K	
3 July 2017	(Spain) Óscar Plano	(Spain) Alcorcón	Transfer	Free	
6 July 2017	(Spain) Nacho	(Spain) Rayo Vallecano	Transfer	Free	
8 July 2017	(Spain) Antoñito	(Spain) Córdoba	Transfer	Free	
10 July 2017	(The Gambia) Sulayman Marreh	(England) Watford	Loan	Free	
12 July 2017	(Spain) Deivid	(Spain) Córdoba	Transfer	Free	
12 July 2017	(Spain) Borja Fernández	(Spain) Almería	Transfer	Free	
12 July 2017	(Spain) Pablo Hervías	(Spain) Eibar	Loan	Free	
17 July 2017	(Spain) Jordi Masip	(Spain) Barcelona	Transfer	Free	

=== Out ===
Date	Player	To	Type	Fee	Ref
17 June 2017	(Spain) Rafa	TBD		Free	
29 June 2017	(Spain) Juan Villar	(Spain) Tenerife	Transfer	Free	
30 June 2017	(Spain) Joan Jordán	(Spain) Espanyol	Loan return	Free	
30 June 2017	(Serbia) Dejan Dražić	(Spain) Celta	Loan return	Free	
30 June 2017	(Spain) Álex López	(Spain) Celta	Loan return	Free	
30 June 2017	(Spain) Raúl de Tomás	(Spain) Real Madrid B	Loan return	Free	
30 June 2017	(Chile) Igor Lichnovsky	(Portugal) Porto	Loan return	Free	
30 June 2017	(Argentina) Cristian Espinoza	(Spain) Villarreal	Loan return	Free	
30 June 2017	(Spain) Markel Etxeberria	(Spain) Athletic Bilbao	Loan return	Free	
1 July 2017	(Argentina) Luciano Balbi	TBD		Free	
1 July 2017	(Spain) Víctor Pérez	TBD		Free	
6 July 2017	(Spain) Samuel Llorca	(Spain) Hércules	Transfer	Free	
13 July 2017	(Portugal) André Leão	(Portugal) Paços Ferreira	Transfer	Free	
22 July 2017	(Spain) Guzmán	(Spain) Badajoz	Transfer	Free	
28 July 2017	(Spain) Pau Torres	(Spain) Cartagena	Transfer	Free	

== Competitions ==
=== Overall ===
Competition	Final position
Segunda División	5th
Copa del Rey	Round of 32

=== Liga ===
==== League table ====
Pos	Team	Pld	W	D	L	GF	GA	GD	Pts	Promotion, qualification or relegation
3	Zaragoza	42	20	11	11	57	44	+13	71 (Note: Zaragoza finished ahead of Sporting Gijón on head-to-head points: Sporting Gijón 0–1 Zaragoza, Zaragoza 2–1 Sporting Gijón)	Qualification for promotion play-offs
4	Sporting Gijón	42	21	8	13	60	40	+20	71	Qualification for promotion play-offs
5	Valladolid (O, P)	42	19	10	13	69	55	+14	67	Qualification for promotion play-offs
6	Numancia	42	18	11	13	52	41	+11	65 (Note: Numancia finished ahead of Oviedo on head-to-head goal difference: Oviedo 3–1 Numancia, Numancia 3–0 Oviedo)	Qualification for promotion play-offs
7	Oviedo	42	18	11	13	54	48	+6	65	

Source: La Liga
Rules for classification: 1) points; 2) head-to-head points; 3) head-to-head goal difference; 4) goal difference; 5) number of goals scored
(O) Play-off winners; (P) Promoted

==== Matches ====
Kickoff times are in CET. Win Draw Loss

Match	Opponent	Venue	Result
1	Barcelona B	H	1–2
2	Sevilla At.	A	1–2
3	Tenerife	H	2–0
4	Cultural	A	4–4
5	Granada	H	2–1
6	Huesca	A	1–0
7	Córdoba	H	4–1
8	Rayo	A	4–1
9	Alcorcón	H	4–0
10	Almería	A	1–1
11	Lugo	H	2–2
12	Reus	A	2–2
13	Nàstic	H	0–3
14	R. Sporting	A	1–1
15	Oviedo	H	3–1
16	Cádiz	A	1–0
17	Numancia	H	2–3
18	Albacete	A	2–1
19	Lorca	H	3–0
20	Zaragoza	H	3–2
21	Osasuna	A	4–2

Match	Opponent	Venue	Result
22	Barcelona B	A	0–1
23	Sevilla At.	H	1–0
24	Tenerife	A	0–0
25	Cultural	H	3–2
26	Granada	A	1–0
27	Huesca	H	3–2
28	Córdoba	A	2–1
29	Rayo	H	1–1
30	Alcorcón	A	0–0
31	Almería	H	2–1
32	Lugo	A	0–0
33	Reus	H	1–0
34	Nàstic	A	1–0
35	R. Sporting	H	0–1
36	Oviedo	A	1–2
37	Cádiz	H	1–1
38	Numancia	A	0–1
39	Albacete	H	3–2
40	Lorca	A	1–5
41	Zaragoza	A	3–2
42	Osasuna	H	2–0

=== Copa del Rey ===
6 September 2017 Round 2	Huesca	0 - 2	Real Valladolid	Huesca
21:00	Luso (yellow card) 52'; Carlos David Moreno (yellow card) 53' (yellow-red card)	Report	Óscar Plano 16'; Ángel (yellow card) 38'; Marreh (yellow card) 46'; Asier Villalibre 50'; Toni (yellow card) 62'; Antonio Cotán (yellow card) 83'; Kiko Olivas (yellow card) 85'	Stadium: Estadio El Alcoraz; Referee: (Spain) Álvaro Moreno

21 September 2017 Round 3	Cultural y Deportiva Leonesa	0 - 4	Real Valladolid	León
20:00		Report	Antonio Cotán 21' (pen.); Marreh (yellow card) 27'; Javi Moyano (yellow card) 44'; Gianniotas 50'; Ángel (yellow card) 60'; Anuar 83'; Asier Villalibre 89'	Stadium: Estadio Reino de León; Referee: (Spain) David Pérez

25 October 2017 Round of 32 First Leg	Real Valladolid	1 - 2	Leganés	Valladolid
20:30	Antonio Cotán 52'	Report	Diego Rico (yellow card) 28' (goal) 46'; Erik Morán (yellow card) 36'; Muñoz (yellow card) 76'; Brašanac (yellow card) 78'; Beauvue 88'	Stadium: Estadio José Zorrilla; Attendance: 7,289; Referee: (Spain) Jesús Gil Manzano

28 November 2017 Round of 32 Second Leg	Leganés	1 - 0 (3 - 1 agg.)	Real Valladolid	Leganés
19:30	Tito 34'; Bustinza (yellow card) 56'; Gabriel (yellow card) 85'; Gerard Gumbau (yellow card) 87'	Report	Fernando Calero (yellow card) 70'; Iván Salvador (yellow card) 81'	Stadium: Estadio Municipal de Butarque; Attendance: 5,732; Referee: (Spain) José Luis Munuera Montero
