= Gaizka =

Gaizka is a male given name of Basque origin, meaning saviour and therefore similar to the (Castilian) Spanish name Salvador or Jesús (The Saviour). Notable people with the name include:

== Given name ==
- Gaizka Ayesa (born 2001), Spanish footballer
- Gaizka Bergara, (born 1986), Spanish footballer
- Gaizka Campos (born 1997), Spanish footballer
- Gaizka Fernández Soldevilla (born 1981), Spanish historian
- Gaizka Garitano (born 1975), Spanish footballer and coach
- Gaizka Larrazabal (born 1997), Spanish footballer
- Gaizka Lejarreta (born 1978), Spanish cyclist
- Gaizka Mendieta (born 1974), Spanish footballer
- Gaizka Saizar (born 1980), Spanish footballer
- Gaizka Toquero (born 1984), Spanish footballer
- Gaizka Urresti (born 1967), Spanish screenwriter/director
