= Manu del Moral =

Spanish footballer (born 1984)

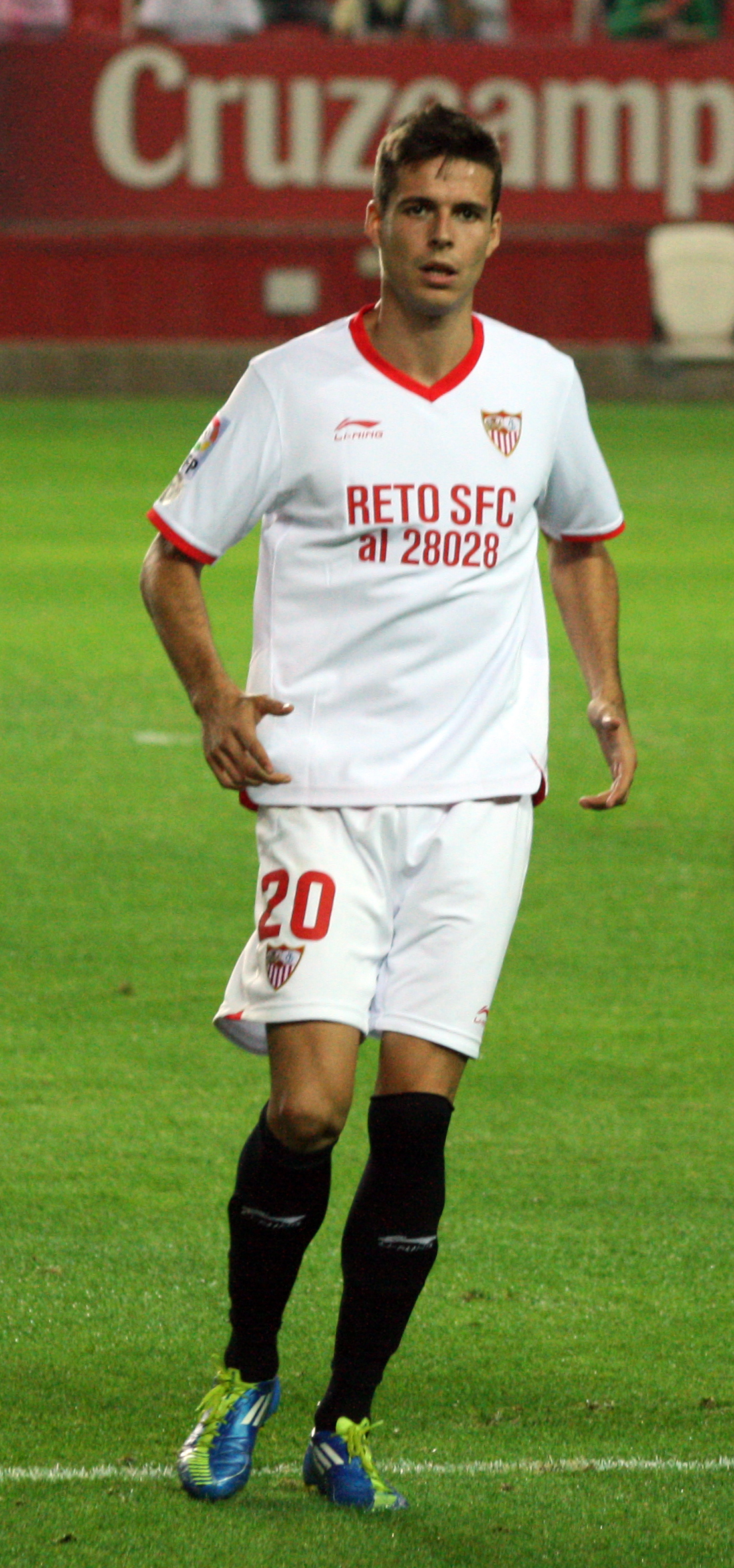
- Manu with Sevilla in 2011

Personal information
- Full name: Manuel del Moral Fernández
- Date of birth: 25 February 1984 (age 42)
- Place of birth: Jaén, Spain
- Height: 1.85 m (6 ft 1 in)
- Position: Forward

Team information
- Current team: Getafe B (manager)

Youth career
- Jaén
- 2001–2002: Atlético Madrid

Senior career*
Years	Team	Apps	(Gls)
2002–2006	Atlético Madrid B	71	(11)
2004–2006	Atlético Madrid	5	(0)
2004–2005	→ Recreativo (loan)	33	(4)
2006–2011	Getafe	159	(37)
2011–2015	Sevilla	56	(11)
2013–2014	→ Elche (loan)	24	(2)
2014–2015	→ Eibar (loan)	28	(3)
2015–2016	Valladolid	25	(3)
2016–2018	Numancia	51	(17)
2018–2019	Gimnàstic	15	(2)
2019	Rayo Majadahonda	14	(3)
Total		481	(93)

International career
2002–2003	Spain U19	4	(3)
2002–2003	Spain U20	9	(0)
2005	Spain U23	5	(2)
2011	Spain	1	(0)

Managerial career
- 2021–2022: Cultural Asako Motril
- 2024–2025: Motril (assistant)
- 2025: Motril
- 2025–: Getafe B
- * Club domestic league appearances and goals

Manuel "Manu" del Moral Fernández (born 25 February 1984) is a Spanish former professional footballer who played as either a forward or winger. He is the current manager of Getafe B.

He played 272 games and scored 53 goals in La Liga, representing Atlético Madrid, Getafe, Sevilla, Elche and Eibar. In the Segunda División, serving five other clubs, he recorded 138 appearances and 29 goals.

Del Moral won one cap for the Spain national team.

== Club career ==
=== Atlético Madrid ===
Del Moral was born in Jaén, Andalusia. After starting his youth career with local Real Jaén, he finished it with Atlético Madrid, where he played alongside Braulio, and served a one-and-a-half-season loan in the Segunda División at Recreativo de Huelva, appearing in only five matches in his first year.

While mainly registered with the capital club's reserves, del Moral did play five La Liga games in the 2005–06 campaign, mainly as a late substitute.

=== Getafe ===
Del Moral joined Madrid neighbours Getafe CF for 2006–07, scoring his first top-flight goal on 22 October 2006 in a 2–1 away win over precisely Recreativo and finishing the season with eight (squad's second-best, behind Dani Güiza). The following campaign, he teamed up again with Braulio and netted seven times – joint-top scorer alongside Juan Ángel Albín– while also helping the Madrid outskirts team to the quarter-finals of the UEFA Cup.

The arrival of Roberto Soldado relegated del Moral to a more secondary role in 2008–09, but he still made 29 league appearances, operating mostly on the wings. On 24 January 2010, he scored the game's only goal as Getafe defeated former side Atlético Madrid for the first time at home in its history. On 7 November, he netted in a 1–3 home loss against FC Barcelona to become the club's best-ever scorer in the top division for the second time, surpassing precisely Soldado.

On 14 March 2011, del Moral scored three goals against Athletic Bilbao in only 25 minutes, one in his own net, in an eventual 2–2 home draw. He finished the season with nine goals, in a narrow escape from relegation.

=== Sevilla ===
On 23 May 2011, del Moral signed a four-year contract with Sevilla FC for €4 million. Following the departure of winger Diego Capel and the ageing of striker Frédéric Kanouté, he was immediately cast into his new team's starting XI. On 25 October, he hit an injury-time header to earn his side one point at home against Racing de Santander (2–2) – he had also opened the score late into the first half.

In late March 2012, del Moral scored braces in two consecutive 3–0 away wins, first against Santander then in a local derby at Granada CF. After only three competitive goals in the 2012–13 campaign, he was loaned to Elche CF and SD Eibar, but managed just five top-tier goals both teams combined.

=== Later career ===
On 27 August 2015, del Moral signed a one-year contract with Real Valladolid. He continued to play in the second tier the following seasons, representing CD Numancia, Gimnàstic de Tarragona and CF Rayo Majadahonda; with the first of those teams, in the 2018 promotion play-offs final, he scored in a 1–1 draw at Valladolid following a 3–0 loss in the first leg.

Del Moral announced his retirement on 26 September 2019, at the age of 35.

== International career ==
On 7 June 2011, after his best season at Getafe, del Moral made his debut for Spain, replacing David Villa during half-time of a 3–0 friendly victory over Venezuela.

== Coaching career ==
On 1 October 2021, del Moral was appointed manager of Primera Andaluza side CD Cultural Asako Motril. He moved to CF Motril in 2023; initially a match delegate, he later became an assistant before being named head of the club in January 2025.

On 9 June 2025, del Moral agreed to return to Getafe on a one-year contract, and took over the reserves in the Segunda Federación.

== Career statistics ==
Appearances and goals by club, season and competition
Club	Season	League			Cup		Continental		Other		Total	
Club	Season	Division	Apps	Goals	Apps	Goals	Apps	Goals	Apps	Goals	Apps	Goals
Atlético Madrid B	2002–03	Segunda División B	36	3	—		—		—		36	3
Atlético Madrid B	2003–04	Segunda División B	14	1	—		—		—		14	1
Atlético Madrid B	2005–06	Segunda División B	21	7	—		—		—		21	7
Atlético Madrid B	Total		71	11	—		—		—		71	11
Recreativo (loan)	2003–04	Segunda División	5	1	—		—		—		5	1
Recreativo (loan)	2004–05	Segunda División	28	3	3	0	—		—		31	3
Recreativo (loan)	Total		33	4	3	0	—		—		36	4
Atlético Madrid	2005–06	La Liga	5	0	0	0	—		—		5	0
Getafe	2006–07	La Liga	30	8	6	0	—		—		36	8
Getafe	2007–08	La Liga	34	7	5	1	8 (Note: Appearances in UEFA Cup)	0	—		47	8
Getafe	2008–09	La Liga	29	5	2	0	—		—		31	5
Getafe	2009–10	La Liga	36	8	8	1	—		—		44	9
Getafe	2010–11	La Liga	30	9	2	0	5 (Note: Appearances in UEFA Europa League)	0	—		37	9
Getafe	Total		159	37	23	2	13	0	—		195	39
Sevilla	2011–12	La Liga	34	10	4	0	2	0	—		40	10
Sevilla	2012–13	La Liga	22	1	5	2	—		—		27	3
Sevilla	Total		56	11	9	2	2	0	—		67	13
Elche (loan)	2013–14	La Liga	24	2	0	0	—		—		24	2
Eibar (loan)	2014–15	La Liga	28	3	0	0	—		—		28	3
Valladolid	2015–16	Segunda División	25	3	0	0	—		—		25	3
Numancia	2016–17	Segunda División	20	9	1	0	—		—		21	9
Numancia	2017–18	Segunda División	31	8	1	0	—		1 (Note: Appearance in La Liga play-offs)	1	33	9
Numancia	Total		51	17	2	0	—		1	1	54	18
Gimnàstic	2018–19	Segunda División	15	2	0	0	—		—		15	0
Rayo Majadahonda	2018–19	Segunda División	14	3	0	0	—		—		14	3
Career total			481	93	37	4	15	0	1	1	534	98

== Honours ==
Getafe

- Copa del Rey runner-up: 2006–07, 2007–08

Spain U20

- FIFA U-20 World Cup runner-up: 2003

Spain U23

- Mediterranean Games: 2005
