= Antonio Cotán =

Spanish footballer (born 1995)

Personal information
- Full name: Antonio Jesús Cotán Pérez
- Date of birth: 19 September 1995 (age 31)
- Place of birth: Olivares, Spain
- Height: 1.76 m (5 ft 9 in)
- Position: Midfielder

Team information
- Current team: Atlètic Lleida
- Number: 17

Youth career
- Sevilla

Senior career*
Years	Team	Apps	(Gls)
2012–2017	Sevilla B	143	(11)
2014–2016	Sevilla	3	(0)
2017–2019	Valladolid	8	(0)
2019	Gimnàstic	10	(0)
2019–2020	Roda	25	(1)
2020–2023	Numancia	68	(1)
2023–2024	Melilla	18	(0)
2024–2025	Tudelano	29	(0)
2025–2026	Vihren Sandanski	7	(0)
2026–	Atlètic Lleida	13	(0)

International career
2012	Spain U17	5	(0)
2013	Spain U18	1	(0)
2013	Spain U19	5	(0)
- * Club domestic league appearances and goals as of 15 May 2026

Antonio Jesús Cotán Pérez (born 19 September 1995) is a Spanish professional footballer who plays as a central midfielder for Segunda Federación club Atlètic Lleida.

== Club career ==
=== Sevilla ===
Born in Olivares, Province of Seville, Cotán came through the youth ranks at local club Sevilla FC, spending his first season as a senior with the reserves in the Segunda División B. On 9 January 2013 he first appeared with the first team, against RCD Mallorca in the round of 16 of the Copa del Rey, but did not leave the bench in the 1–2 home loss.

On 8 August 2013, one month shy of his 18th birthday, Cotán made his first official appearance with the Andalusians, playing the entire second half of a 6–1 away win over FK Mladost Podgorica in the third qualifying round of the UEFA Europa League. On 11 May of the following year, as the main squad had already secured the fifth place and manager Unai Emery was resting his starters for the Europa League final, he made his La Liga debut, featuring the full 90 minutes in the 1–0 defeat at Getafe CF.

Cotán subsequently featured almost exclusively for the B side the following years, helping them in their promotion to Segunda División in 2016. He scored his first professional goal on 21 August of that year, opening a 3–3 home draw against Girona FC.

=== Valladolid ===
On 8 August 2017, Cotán signed a two-year contract with fellow second-division club Real Valladolid, with Sevilla holding a buyback clause. He featured rarely during the campaign due to injury, in a promotion in the playoffs.

Cotán left the Estadio José Zorrilla as a free agent on 30 January 2019, having failed to appear in any league matches in the season.

=== Gimnàstic ===
On 31 January 2019, Cotán agreed to a six-month deal at Gimnàstic de Tarragona of the second tier. He was used sparingly in his short spell, in an eventual relegation.

=== Roda and Numancia ===
On 25 July 2019, Cotán moved abroad for the first time in his career and joined Roda JC Kerkrade of the Dutch Eerste Divisie. On 2 September of the following year, he returned to his home nation after signing for CD Numancia, recently relegated to division three.

=== Later career ===
Cotán remained in the Spanish lower leagues until his retirement, representing UD Melilla and CD Tudelano.

== Career statistics ==
As of match played 1 May 2021

Appearances and goals by club, season and competition
Club	Season	League			National Cup		Continental		Other		Total	
Club	Season	Division	Apps	Goals	Apps	Goals	Apps	Goals	Apps	Goals	Apps	Goals
Sevilla Atlético	2012–13	Segunda División B	19	0	—		—		—		19	0
Sevilla Atlético	2013–14	Segunda División B	29	2	—		—		—		29	2
Sevilla Atlético	2014–15	Segunda División B	34	4	—		—		—		34	4
Sevilla Atlético	2015–16	Segunda División B	29	0	—		—		1 (Note: Appearance in Segunda División B play-offs)	0	30	0
Sevilla Atlético	2016–17	Segunda División	32	5	—		—		—		32	5
Sevilla Atlético	Total		143	11	0	0	0	0	1	0	144	11
Sevilla	2013–14	La Liga	2	0	0	0	2 (Note: Appearances in UEFA Europa League)	0	—		4	0
Sevilla	2014–15	La Liga	0	0	2	0	0	0	—		2	0
Sevilla	2015–16	La Liga	1	0	0	0	0	0	—		1	0
Sevilla	2016–17	La Liga	0	0	0	0	0	0	—		0	0
Sevilla	Total		3	0	2	0	2	0	0	0	7	0
Valladolid	2017–18	Segunda División	8	0	4	2	—		—		12	2
Valladolid	2018–19	La Liga	0	0	2	0	—		—		2	0
Valladolid	Total		8	0	6	0	0	0	0	0	14	2
Gimnàstic	2018–19	Segunda División	10	0	0	0	—		—		10	0
Roda	2019–20	Eerste Divisie	25	1	2	0	—		—		27	1
Numancia	2020–21	Segunda División B	21	0	1	0	—		—		22	0
Career total			210	12	11	2	2	0	1	0	224	14
