= Jordi Masip =

Spanish association football player

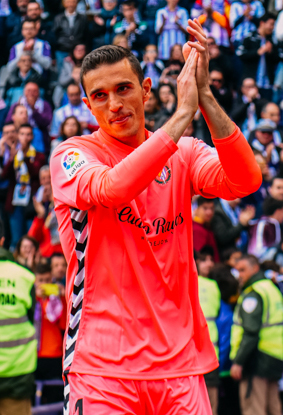
- Masip with Valladolid in 2019

Personal information
- Full name: Jordi Masip López
- Date of birth: 3 January 1989 (age 37)
- Place of birth: Sabadell, Spain
- Height: 1.80 m (5 ft 11 in)
- Position: Goalkeeper

Youth career
- 2001–2004: Mercantil
- 2004–2008: Barcelona

Senior career*
Years	Team	Apps	(Gls)
2008–2014	Barcelona B	79	(0)
2008–2009	→ Vilajuïga (loan)	24	(0)
2014–2017	Barcelona	1	(0)
2017–2024	Valladolid	219	(0)
Total		323	(0)

International career
2004–2006	Spain U17	11	(0)
2014–2016	Catalonia	3	(0)
- * Club domestic league appearances and goals

Jordi Masip López (born 3 January 1989) is a Spanish former professional footballer who played as a goalkeeper.

He spent the vast majority of his career with Barcelona and Valladolid, being third choice with the first club and starting at the second. He made one appearance in La Liga for the former, and 123 for the latter.

== Club career ==
=== Barcelona ===
Born in Sabadell, Barcelona, Catalonia, Masip moved to FC Barcelona's La Masia in 2004, at the age of 15. He made his senior debut in the 2008–09 season, playing with UE Vilajuïga – also in his native region – in the Tercera División, on loan.

Subsequently, Masip returned to FC Barcelona Atlètic, serving as backup or third choice during his first years. In the 2014–15 campaign he was promoted to the first team and given the #25 jersey, playing understudy to both Claudio Bravo and Marc-André ter Stegen.

Masip made his competitive debut for the main squad on 16 December 2014, in an 8–1 home win over SD Huesca at the Camp Nou in the round of 32 of the Copa del Rey. On 23 May of the following year, in the last round and as the club had already been crowned champions, he first appeared in La Liga, conceding second-half goals from Lucas Pérez and Diogo Salomão in a 2–2 home draw with Deportivo de La Coruña.

=== Valladolid ===
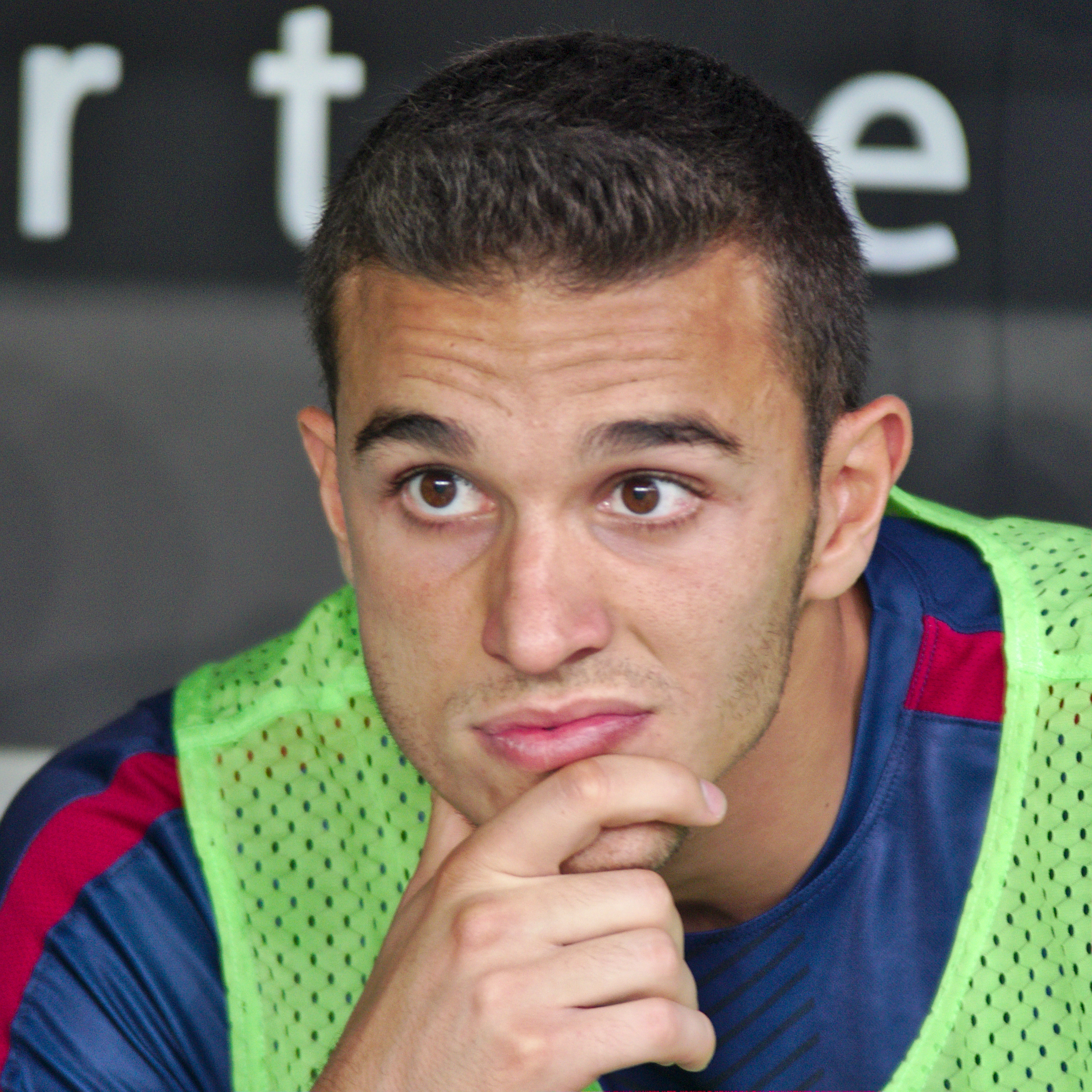
Masip with Barcelona in 2014

On 17 July 2017, free agent Masip signed a three-year contract with Real Valladolid. He played every minute of his debut campaign apart from the final moments of the victorious play-off final against CD Numancia, when manager Sergio awarded back-up Isaac Becerra some game time with promotion from Segunda División all but assured.

Amidst interest from clubs including Sevilla FC and RC Celta de Vigo, Masip extended his contract in July 2019 to keep him at the Estadio José Zorrilla until 2022. In September 2020, he was sidelined with COVID-19, during which Roberto Jiménez played in the Pucela goal. He played roughly two thirds of league matches as the team were relegated, including when his teammate suffered from the same virus in March; in 2021–22 he was second-choice until December.

Masip terminated his contract with Valladolid on 30 June 2024. The following 8 March, the 36-year-old announced his retirement.

== Career statistics ==
Appearances and goals by club, season and competition
Club	Season	League			Copa del Rey		Europe		Other		Total	
Club	Season	Division	Apps	Goals	Apps	Goals	Apps	Goals	Apps	Goals	Apps	Goals
Barcelona B	2009–10	Segunda División B	3	0	—		—		—		3	0
Barcelona B	2010–11	Segunda División	12	0	—		—		—		12	0
Barcelona B	2011–12	Segunda División	9	0	—		—		—		9	0
Barcelona B	2012–13	Segunda División	21	0	—		—		—		21	0
Barcelona B	2013–14	Segunda División	34	0	—		—		—		34	0
Barcelona B	Total		79	0	—		—		—		79	0
Vilajuïga (loan)	2008–09	Tercera División	24	0	—		—		—		24	0
Barcelona	2012–13	La Liga	0	0	0	0	0	0	0	0	0	0
Barcelona	2014–15	La Liga	1	0	1	0	0	0	0	0	2	0
Barcelona	2015–16	La Liga	0	0	2	0	0	0	0	0	2	0
Barcelona	2016–17	La Liga	0	0	0	0	0	0	0	0	0	0
Barcelona	Total		1	0	3	0	0	0	0	0	4	0
Valladolid	2017–18	Segunda División	42	0	0	0	—		4 (Note: Appearances in La Liga play-offs)	0	46	0
Valladolid	2018–19	La Liga	35	0	0	0	—		—		35	0
Valladolid	2019–20	La Liga	35	0	1	0	—		—		36	0
Valladolid	2020–21	La Liga	25	0	0	0	—		—		25	0
Valladolid	2021–22	Segunda División	23	0	1	0	—		—		24	0
Valladolid	2022–23	La Liga	28	0	1	0	—		—		29	0
Valladolid	2023–24	Segunda División	31	0	1	0	—		0	0	32	0
Valladolid	Total		219	0	4	0	—		4	0	227	0
Career total			323	0	7	0	0	0	4	0	334	0

== Honours ==
Barcelona

- La Liga: 2014–15
- Copa del Rey: 2014–15, 2015–16
- Supercopa de España: 2016
- FIFA Club World Cup: 2015

Valladolid

- Segunda División play-offs: 2018
