= Marc Mateu =

Spanish footballer

Personal information
- Full name: Marc Mateu Sanjuán
- Date of birth: 16 June 1990 (age 36)
- Place of birth: Valencia, Spain
- Height: 1.80 m (5 ft 11 in)
- Position: Left-back

Team information
- Current team: Tenerife
- Number: 21

Youth career
- El Planter
- 2006–2008: Levante

Senior career*
Years	Team	Apps	(Gls)
2008–2010	Levante B	28	(2)
2008–2012	Levante	12	(0)
2010	→ Real Unión (loan)	8	(1)
2011	→ Badajoz (loan)	9	(0)
2012	→ Zaragoza B (loan)	15	(0)
2012–2013	Zaragoza B	34	(4)
2013–2014	Villarreal C	26	(2)
2014–2015	Villarreal B	30	(2)
2015–2020	Numancia	172	(7)
2020–2021	Castellón	38	(4)
2021–2023	Huesca	71	(6)
2023–2025	Eldense	75	(2)
2025–	Tenerife	5	(0)
- * Club domestic league appearances and goals as of 9 June 2026

Marc Mateu Sanjuán (born 16 June 1990) is a Spanish footballer who plays for Segunda División club Tenerife. Mainly a left-back, he can also play as a central midfielder or a winger.

== Club career ==
Mateu was born in Valencia. Having emerged through local Levante UD's youth academy, he made his first-team debut during the 2008–09 season, in a Segunda División game against Córdoba CF (3–0 home win, 25 minutes played).

On 10 August 2010, Mateu signed his first professional contract, running until 2013, and was loaned to Segunda División B club Real Unión. He subsequently served loans at CD Badajoz and Deportivo Aragón, signing permanently with the latter side after cutting ties with Levante in July 2012.

On 30 May 2013, Mateu was released by Zaragoza after a bout of indiscipline. He moved to Villarreal CF's C team in October, and was promoted to the reserves the following year.

On 28 July 2015, Mateu signed for CD Numancia of the second tier. He scored his first professional goal on 3 April 2016, the decider in a 3–2 home victory over SD Huesca.

Mateu was a regular starter during his spell at the Nuevo Estadio Los Pajaritos, leaving after relegation in 2020. On 23 August that year, he agreed to a two-year deal with CD Castellón, recently returned to the second division.

On 29 June 2021, after another relegation, Mateu signed a two-year contract with SD Huesca still in division two. He terminated his link with the club on 25 July 2023, and agreed to a two-year deal at CD Eldense in the same league later that day.

During the 2023–24 campaign, Mateu was converted to a left-back and established himself as a starter in that position. On 9 June 2025, having suffered relegation, he signed a two-year contract with CD Tenerife which also had dropped down a level.

== Career statistics ==
As of 16 June 2018

Appearances and goals by club, season and competition
Club	Season	League			Cup		Other		Total	
Club	Season	Division	Apps	Goals	Apps	Goals	Apps	Goals	Apps	Goals
Levante	2008–09	Segunda División	3	0	0	0	0	0	3	0
Levante	2009–10	Segunda División	9	0	0	0	0	0	9	0
Levante	2010–11	Segunda División	0	0	0	0	0	0	0	0
Levante	2011–12	La Liga	0	0	0	0	0	0	0	0
Levante	Total		12	0	0	0	0	0	12	0
Real Unión (loan)	2010–11	Segunda División B	8	1	3	0	0	0	11	1
Badajoz (loan)	2010–11	Segunda División B	9	0	0	0	0	0	9	0
Zaragoza B (loan)	2011–12	Segunda División B	15	0	0	0	0	0	15	0
Zaragoza B	2012–13	Segunda División B	34	4	0	0	0	0	34	4
Villarreal B	2014–15	Segunda División B	30	2	0	0	0	0	30	2
Numancia	2015–16	Segunda División	29	1	1	0	0	0	30	1
Numancia	2016–17	Segunda División	39	3	0	0	0	0	39	3
Numancia	2017–18	Segunda División	46	2	5	1	0	0	51	3
Numancia	Total		114	6	6	1	0	0	120	7
Career totals			222	13	9	1	0	0	231	14
