= Guillermo Fernández (footballer, born 1993) =

Spanish footballer

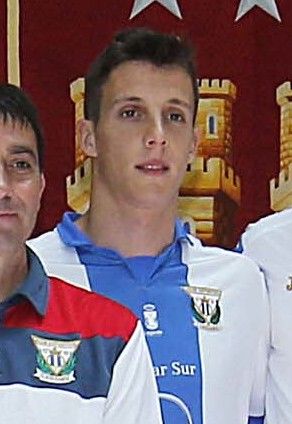
- Guillermo with Leganés in 2016

Personal information
- Full name: Guillermo Fernández Hierro
- Date of birth: 23 May 1993 (age 33)
- Place of birth: Bilbao, Spain
- Height: 1.81 m (5 ft 11 in)
- Position: Forward

Team information
- Current team: Amorebieta

Youth career
- 2002–2003: Etorkizun F. Arrigorriaga
- 2003–2011: Athletic Bilbao

Senior career*
Years	Team	Apps	(Gls)
2010–2013	Bilbao Athletic	104	(28)
2013–2016	Athletic Bilbao	23	(1)
2015–2016	→ Leganés (loan)	23	(5)
2016–2017	Elche	36	(6)
2017–2020	Numancia	83	(16)
2020	Racing Santander	13	(3)
2020–2022	Burgos	52	(10)
2022–2023	Gimnàstic	36	(9)
2023–2024	Cultural Leonesa	32	(4)
2024–2025	NorthEast United	19	(5)
2026	Semen Padang	14	(2)
2026–	Amorebieta	9	(1)
- * Club domestic league appearances and goals as of 17:35, 15 November 2026 (UTC)

Guillermo Fernández Hierro (born 23 May 1993) is a Spanish professional footballer who plays as a forward for Segunda Federación club Amorebieta.

== Club career ==
Born in Bilbao, Biscay and raised in nearby Arrigorriaga, Fernández joined Athletic Bilbao's youth system in 2003. Seven years later, he was promoted to the reserves in the Segunda División B (bypassing Basconia, the farm team and usual step in the progression of young players).

After scoring six goals in only seven appearances for the B's in the beginning of the 2013–14 season, Fernández was called up to the first team by coach Ernesto Valverde. On 21 October 2013, he was included in the squad for a 2–0 La Liga home win against Villarreal, but did not leave the bench. He finally made his debut in the competition on 9 November, starting and playing 68 minutes in a 2–1 victory over Levante also at the San Mamés Stadium.

Fernández scored his first goal for the Lions' main squad on 23 February 2014, coming on for Iker Muniain in the 79th minute of an eventual 2–0 win at Real Betis and netting through a header after 60 seconds. His second came on 21 October in the group phase of the UEFA Champions League, in a 2–1 away loss to Porto.

On 13 August 2015, Fernández was loaned to Leganés of Segunda División in a season-long deal. He scored his first goal ten days later in the 3–2 defeat at Almería, adding five more in all competitions in an eventual promotion.

On 17 August 2016, Fernández terminated his contract with Athletic and signed for two years with Elche later that day. The following 27 June, after suffering relegation, he agreed to a three-year deal at fellow second tier club Numancia.

On 10 January 2018, Fernández scored twice to help to a 2–2 draw against Real Madrid at the Santiago Bernabéu in the Copa del Rey after having come as a first-half substitute, but the hosts had already won 3–0 in the first leg to progress to the quarter-finals. On the last day of the 2020 January transfer window, the free agent joined Racing de Santander until 30 June 2022.

Fernández alternated between the second and third divisions the following seasons, representing Burgos – promoting to the former in 2021– Gimnàstic de Tarragona and Cultural Leonesa. He moved abroad for the first time in his career in July 2024, with the 31-year-old signing with Indian Super League side NorthEast United.

In January 2026, Fernández joined Semen Padang of the Indonesian Super League. On 9 March, he scored twice in a 2–0 win over PSBS Biak.

Fernández returned to Spain ahead of the 2026–27 campaign, on a contract at Segunda Federación's Amorebieta.

== Career statistics ==
As of match played 23 May 2026

Appearances and goals by club, season and competition
Club	Season	League			National Cup		Continental		Other		Total	
Club	Season	Division	Apps	Goals	Apps	Goals	Apps	Goals	Apps	Goals	Apps	Goals
Bilbao Athletic	2009–10	Segunda División B	5	1	—		—		—		5	1
Bilbao Athletic	2010–11	Segunda División B	15	3	—		—		—		15	3
Bilbao Athletic	2011–12	Segunda División B	28	1	—		—		—		28	1
Bilbao Athletic	2012–13	Segunda División B	35	11	—		—		4 (Note: Appearances in Segunda División B play-offs)	2	39	13
Bilbao Athletic	2013–14	Segunda División B	21	12	—		—		—		21	12
Bilbao Athletic	Total		104	28	0	0	0	0	4	2	108	30
Athletic Bilbao	2011–12	La Liga	0	0	0	0	0	0	—		0	0
Athletic Bilbao	2012–13	La Liga	0	0	0	0	0	0	—		0	0
Athletic Bilbao	2013–14	La Liga	9	1	0	0	0	0	—		9	1
Athletic Bilbao	2014–15	La Liga	14	0	1	0	4 (Note: Appearances in UEFA Champions League)	1	—		19	1
Athletic Bilbao	Total		23	1	1	0	4	1	0	0	28	2
Leganés (loan)	2015–16	Segunda División	23	5	4	1	—		—		27	6
Elche	2016–17	Segunda División	36	6	2	1	—		—		38	7
Numancia	2017–18	Segunda División	37	8	4	2	—		4 (Note: Appearances in La Liga play-offs)	1	45	11
Numancia	2018–19	Segunda División	30	6	0	0	—		—		30	6
Numancia	2019–20	Segunda División	16	2	1	0	—		—		17	2
Numancia	Total		83	16	5	2	0	0	4	1	92	19
Racing Santander	2019–20	Segunda División	13	3	0	0	—		—		13	3
Burgos	2020–21	Segunda División B	13	2	2	0	—		2	0	17	2
Burgos	2021–22	Segunda División	39	8	2	0	—		—		41	8
Burgos	Total		52	10	4	0	0	0	2	0	58	10
Gimnàstic Tarragona	2022–23	Primera Federación	36	9	3	0	—		—		39	9
Cultural Leonesa	2023–24	Primera Federación	32	4	0	0	—		—		32	4
NorthEast United	2024–25	Indian Super League	19	5	2	1	—		—		21	6
Semen Padang	2025–26	Super League	14	2	—		—		—		14	2
Career total			435	89	21	5	4	1	10	3	470	98

== Honours ==
NorthEast United

- Durand Cup: 2024
