= Óscar Plano =

Spanish footballer

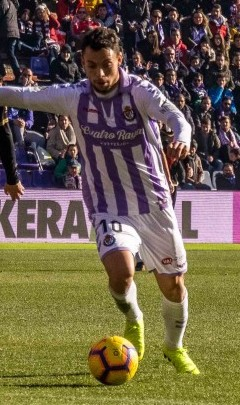
- Plano with Valladolid in 2019

Personal information
- Full name: Óscar Plano Pedreño
- Date of birth: 11 February 1991 (age 35)
- Place of birth: Madrid, Spain
- Height: 1.80 m (5 ft 11 in)
- Position: Attacking midfielder

Team information
- Current team: Intercity

Youth career
- 2001–2002: Móstoles
- 2002–2010: Real Madrid

Senior career*
Years	Team	Apps	(Gls)
2010–2011	Real Madrid C	34	(11)
2011–2014	Real Madrid B	63	(7)
2013–2014	→ Alcorcón (loan)	29	(4)
2014–2017	Alcorcón	110	(16)
2017–2023	Valladolid	210	(22)
2023–2025	Elche	57	(10)
2025–2026	Leganés	32	(3)
2026–	Intercity	0	(0)
- * Club domestic league appearances and goals as of 9 June 2026

Óscar Plano Pedreño (born 11 February 1991) is a Spanish professional footballer who plays as an attacking midfielder for Segunda Federación – Group 3 club Intercity.

== Club career ==
=== Real Madrid ===
Born in Madrid, Plano joined Real Madrid's academy at the age of 11. He made his Segunda División debut with the reserves during the 2012–13 season, scoring four goals for the eighth-placed team.

Plano's first match as a professional took place on 17 August 2012, when he featured 68 minutes in a 2–1 away loss against Villarreal CF B.

=== Alcorcón ===
On 2 September 2013, Plano was loaned to AD Alcorcón for the upcoming campaign. On 29 July 2014, he signed a permanent two-year contract.

Plano netted a career-best nine times in 2015–16 (second-best in the squad, only behind David Rodríguez's 19), helping the side once again retain their second-tier status.

=== Valladolid ===
On 3 July 2017, the free agent Plano joined Real Valladolid on a two-year deal. He contributed four goals in 40 matches in his first season, as the club returned to La Liga after a four-year absence.

Plano's bow in the Spanish top flight occurred on 17 August 2018, coming on as a second-half substitute in the 0–0 draw away to Girona FC.

=== Elche ===
On 4 August 2023, Plano signed a one-year contract with Elche CF, recently relegated to division two as Valladolid. He scored seven goals in his debut campaign, in spite of being sidelined for nearly five months with an ankle injury.

=== Later career ===
Plano remained in the second tier for 2025–26, with the 34-year-old agreeing to a one-year deal at CD Leganés on a free transfer. On 24 August 2026, he moved two levels below by joining CF Intercity.

== Career statistics ==
As of match played 28 May 2023

Appearances and goals by club, season and competition
Club	Season	League			Cup		Europe		Other		Total	
Club	Season	Division	Apps	Goals	Apps	Goals	Apps	Goals	Apps	Goals	Apps	Goals
Real Madrid B	2010–11	Segunda División B	2	1	—		—		1 (Note: Appearance in Segunda División B play-offs)	0	3	1
Real Madrid B	2011–12	Segunda División B	21	2	—		—		—		21	2
Real Madrid B	2012–13	Segunda División	37	4	—		—		—		37	4
Real Madrid B	2013–14	Segunda División	3	0	—		—		—		3	0
Real Madrid B	Total		63	7	—		—		1	0	64	7
Alcorcón (loan)	2013–14	Segunda División	29	4	4	3	—		—		33	7
Alcorcón	2014–15	Segunda División	32	4	1	0	—		—		33	4
Alcorcón	2015–16	Segunda División	40	9	0	0	—		—		40	9
Alcorcón	2016–17	Segunda División	38	3	6	0	—		—		44	3
Alcorcón	Total		110	16	7	0	—		—		117	16
Valladolid	2017–18	Segunda División	40	4	2	1	—		4 (Note: Appearances in La Liga play-offs)	2	46	7
Valladolid	2018–19	La Liga	33	3	3	1	—		—		36	4
Valladolid	2019–20	La Liga	36	4	2	0	—		—		38	4
Valladolid	2020–21	La Liga	36	5	2	3	—		—		38	8
Valladolid	2021–22	Segunda División	32	3	3	0	—		—		35	3
Valladolid	2022–23	La Liga	33	1	3	0	—		—		36	1
Valladolid	Total		210	22	15	5	—		4	2	229	27
Career total			412	49	26	8	0	0	4	2	442	57
