= Javi Pérez (footballer, born 1995) =

Spanish footballer

Personal information
- Full name: Javier Pérez Mateo
- Date of birth: 14 August 1995 (age 31)
- Place of birth: Cabanillas del Campo, Spain
- Height: 1.84 m (6 ft 0 in)
- Position: Midfielder

Youth career
- Guadalajara

Senior career*
Years	Team	Apps	(Gls)
2013–2014	Guadalajara B	21	(2)
2013–2015	Guadalajara	43	(3)
2015–2017	Almería B	58	(3)
2017–2019	Valladolid B	65	(6)
2018–2019	Valladolid	1	(0)
2019–2022	Ibiza	77	(3)
2022–2023	Burgos	0	(0)
2023–2024	Alcorcón	23	(2)
2024–2025	Huesca	21	(1)
2025–2026	Tenerife	9	(0)
- * Club domestic league appearances and goals as of 9 June 2026

Javier "Javi" Pérez Mateo (born 14 August 1995) is a Spanish footballer who plays as a central midfielder.

== Club career ==
Born in Cabanillas del Campo, Guadalajara, Castile-La Mancha, Pérez was a CD Guadalajara youth graduate. After making his senior debut with the reserves, he made his first team debut on 8 December 2013, coming on as a late substitute for Álvaro Zazo in a 4–0 Segunda División B home routing of CP Cacereño.

On 11 July 2014, Pérez extended his contract until 2017. He was an ever-present figure during the season, as his side missed out promotion in the play-offs.

On 15 July 2015, Pérez signed a three-year contract with UD Almería, being initially assigned to the B-team also in the third level. On 31 August 2017 he moved to another reserve team, Real Valladolid B in the same division.

On 6 June 2018, Pérez renewed his contract with Valladolid until 2019. The following day, he made his first team debut by coming on as a late substitute for Anuar Tuhami in a 3–1 home win against Sporting de Gijón, in the Segunda División play-offs.

On 10 August 2019, Pérez signed for UD Ibiza still in division three, and was a regular starter as his side achieved a first-ever promotion to the second level in 2021. He terminated his contract with the club on 29 August 2022, and joined Burgos CF in the second level the following day.

After struggling with injuries which kept him out for the entire 2022–23 season, Pérez terminated his link with the Blanquinegros on 16 August 2023. On 18 November, he signed for AD Alcorcón after a trial period.

On 31 July 2024, after suffering relegation with Alkor, Pérez agreed to a one-year deal with SD Huesca also in division two.
