= Javi Moyano =

Spanish footballer

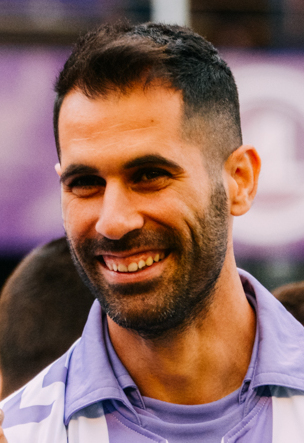
- Moyano with Valladolid in 2019

Personal information
- Full name: Javier Moyano Lujano
- Date of birth: 23 February 1986 (age 40)
- Place of birth: Jaén, Spain
- Height: 1.77 m (5 ft 10 in)
- Position: Wing-back

Team information
- Current team: Jaén

Youth career
- Jaén

Senior career*
Years	Team	Apps	(Gls)
2005–2010	Jaén	136	(5)
2007	→ Lanzarote (loan)	16	(1)
2010–2011	Almería B	36	(0)
2011–2012	Melilla	34	(3)
2012–2015	Tenerife	115	(1)
2015–2020	Valladolid	146	(1)
2021–2022	Castellón	31	(0)
2022–	Jaén	120	(5)
- * Club domestic league appearances and goals as of 14:46, 19 June 2026 (UTC)

Javier 'Javi' Moyano Lujano (born 23 February 1986) is a Spanish professional footballer who plays for Primera Federación club Real Jaén as a right wing-back.

== Club career ==
Born in Jaén, Andalusia, Moyano finished his youth career with local Real Jaén, making his senior debut in the 2004–05 season in the Segunda División B. He struggled to make the first-team setup in his first years but, after a short loan spell at UD Lanzarote, returned to appear in an average of 32 league matches, always in the third division.

Moyano signed with UD Almería in July 2010, being assigned to the reserves also in division three. He remained in that tier the following years, representing UD Melilla and CD Tenerife and helping the latter club to achieve promotion in 2013 by playing 39 games and scoring one goal.

On 18 August 2013, Moyano made his first Segunda División appearance, starting in a 1–0 away loss against AD Alcorcón. Exactly two years later, he signed a two-year deal with fellow second-tier team Real Valladolid, contributing 29 matches and one goal– play-offs included – in his third season as they returned to La Liga after a four-year absence.

Moyano's maiden appearance in the Spanish top flight took place on 17 August 2018 at the age of 32, when he played the entire 0–0 away draw with Girona FC. On 5 October 2020, after 156 competitive appearances, he terminated his contract with the club.

On 22 January 2021, free agent Moyano signed a short-term deal with second division side CD Castellón.
