= Jagoba Arrasate =

Spanish football manager (born 1978)

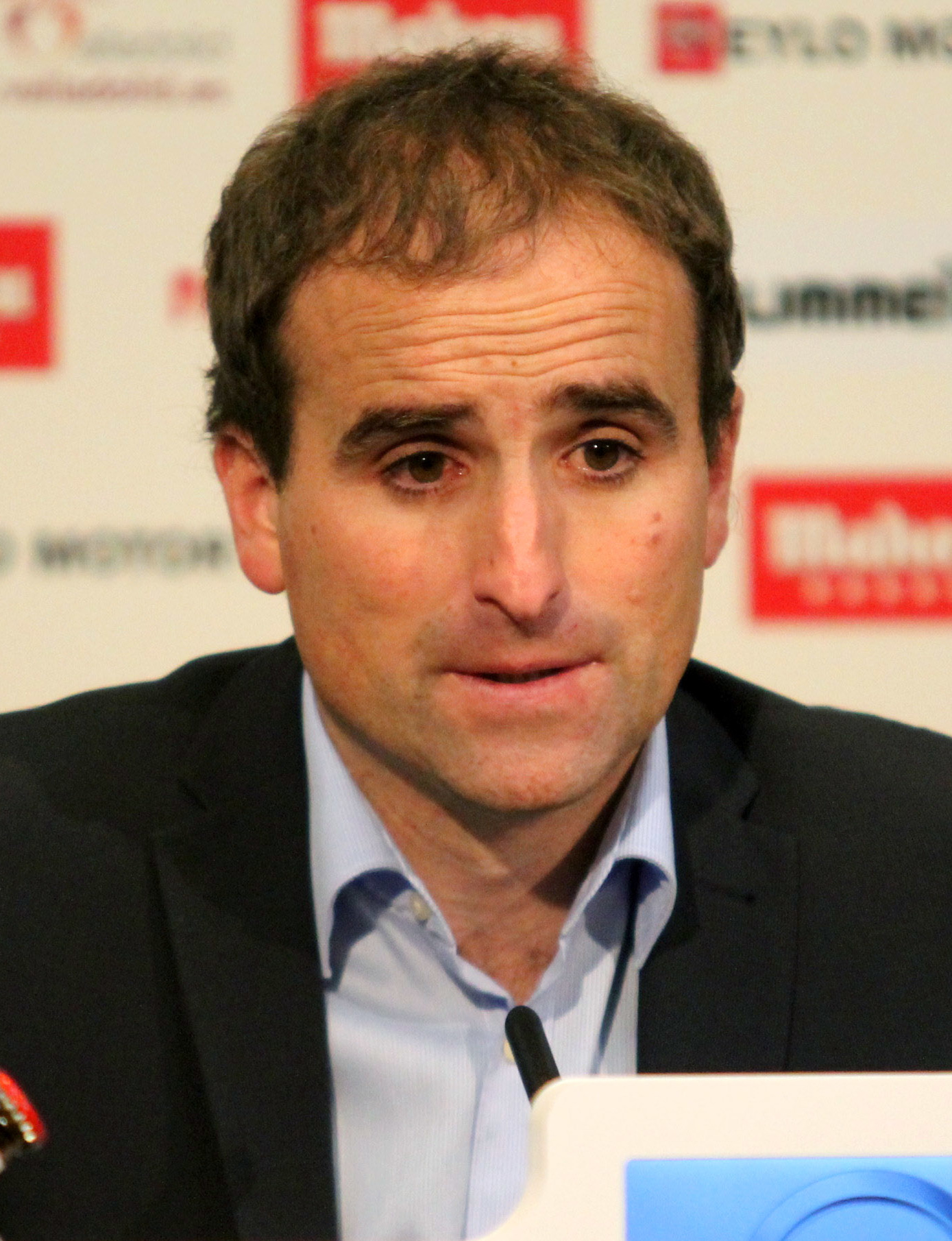
- Arrasate in 2013

Personal information
- Full name: Jagoba Arrasate Elustondo
- Date of birth: 22 April 1978 (age 48)
- Place of birth: Berriatua, Spain
- Height: 1.69 m (5 ft 7 in)
- Position: Forward

Team information
- Current team: Osasuna; Basque Country (manager)

Youth career
- Real Sociedad

Senior career*
Years	Team	Apps	(Gls)
1997–2001	Eibar B		
2001–2002	Lemona		
2002–2003	Beasain		
2003–2005	Elgoibar		
2005–2006	Portugalete	10	(1)
2006–2007	Amorebieta		

Managerial career
- 2007–2008: Berriatuko
- 2008–2010: Elgoibar
- 2010–2012: Real Sociedad (youth)
- 2012–2013: Real Sociedad (assistant)
- 2013–2014: Real Sociedad
- 2015–2018: Numancia
- 2018–2024: Osasuna
- 2024–: Basque Country
- 2024–2026: Mallorca
- 2026–: Osasuna
- * Club domestic league appearances and goals

Jagoba Arrasate Elustondo (born 22 April 1978) is a Spanish former footballer who played as a forward. He is currently manager of La Liga club Osasuna and the Basque Country national team.

After an amateur playing career, he rose through the coaching ranks of Real Sociedad where he made his La Liga debut in 2013, also leading Osasuna in the top flight and taking the latter club to the Segunda División title in 2019.

== Playing career ==
Born in Berriatua, Biscay, Arrasate only played for lower league clubs during his ten-year senior career, the majority in the Tercera División and all in his native Basque Country. In the Segunda División B, he represented Eibar B and Portugalete, being relegated with the latter team at the end of the 2005–06 campaign.

Arrasate retired in 2007 at only 29, after one season in the fourth tier with Amorebieta.

== Coaching career ==
=== Real Sociedad ===
Arrasate became a coach immediately after retiring, his first two clubs being amateur. In 2010, he returned to Real Sociedad where he had been developed, being appointed coach of the youth teams.

In July 2012, Arrasate was promoted to Real's first team as assistant to Philippe Montanier. The following year, as the Frenchman left for Rennes, he was named his successor. He debuted in La Liga on 17 August with a 2–0 home win against Getafe, and led the team in their campaign in the UEFA Champions League, in which they defeated Lyon to qualify for the group stage for the first time in a decade, but finished bottom of the table.

In April 2014, after having taken Real to the semi-finals of the Copa del Rey where they lost 3–1 on aggregate to Barcelona, Arrasate had his contract renewed until 2016. He was sacked on 2 November after a 3–1 loss to Krasnodar in the play-off round of the UEFA Europa League, followed by one win from ten at the start of the league season.

=== Numancia ===
Arrasate was appointed at the helm of Numancia on 12 June 2015, replacing Juan Antonio Anquela. On his debut on 23 August, the team won 6–3 at home to Tenerife on the first day of the second-division campaign; towards the end of a 10th-place finish, he was rewarded with one more season in the job.

In June 2017, despite finishing 17th – then the joint worst in Numancia's Segunda history – Arrasate received another extension at the Nuevo Estadio Los Pajaritos. In the ensuing season, he led the Sorians to the finals of the play-offs but missed out promotion after a 4–1 aggregate loss to Real Valladolid; he stepped down on 18 June 2018.

=== Osasuna ===
On 20 June 2018, Arrasate was named Osasuna manager after agreeing to a one-year contract. He renewed his contract until 2020 the following 5 March, and achieved promotion to the top flight as champions.

Arrasate signed another new deal on 18 November 2019, tying him to the Rojillos until June 2022. Six days later, the team lost 2–1 at home to local rivals Athletic Bilbao, ending a club-best 602 days unbeaten at the El Sadar Stadium.

On 7 March 2022, Arrasate's contract was extended for two more years, with the news being broken through a banner on the Avenida Carlos III in Pamplona. In the ensuing season, he led Osasuna to the Spanish Cup final for the first time in 18 years after a 2–1 extra-time win at home to Sevilla in the quarter-finals and a 2–1 aggregate defeat of Athletic in the next round; they lost the decisive match 2–1 to Real Madrid. In the domestic league, a seventh-place finish meant qualification for the UEFA Europa Conference League in a return to Europe for the first time in 16 years.

=== Mallorca ===
On 10 June 2024, Arrasate was appointed at fellow top-tier Mallorca on a three-year deal. On 23 February 2026, with his side in the relegation zone after finishing tenth in his debut campaign, he was dismissed.

=== Osasuna return ===
Arrasate returned to Osasuna on 12 October 2026, taking over from Luis Miguel Ramis on a contract until June 2029.

== Personal life ==
On 12 August 2020, Arrasate tested positive for COVID-19. As of 2023, he had three children.

== Managerial statistics ==
As of match played 22 November 2026

Managerial record by team and tenure
Team	Nat	From	To	Record								Ref
Team	Nat	From	To	G	W	D	L	GF	GA	GD	Win %	Ref
Berriatuko	(Spain)	1 July 2007	30 June 2008	34	11	8	15	39	55	−16	32.35	
Elgoibar	(Spain)	1 July 2008	30 June 2010	80	39	21	20	95	66	+29	48.75	
Real Sociedad	(Spain)	7 June 2013	2 November 2014	68	26	18	24	96	90	+6	38.24	
Numancia	(Spain)	12 June 2015	18 June 2018	138	45	51	42	160	157	+3	32.61	
Osasuna	(Spain)	20 June 2018	30 June 2024	256	102	65	89	308	313	−5	39.84	
Mallorca	(Spain)	1 July 2024	23 February 2026	68	21	15	32	69	94	−25	30.88	
Osasuna	(Spain)	12 October 2026	Present	6	3	1	2	11	5	+6	50.00	
Career total				650	247	179	224	776	778	−2	38.00	—

== Honours ==
=== Manager ===
Osasuna

- Segunda División: 2018–19
- Copa del Rey runner-up: 2022–23

Individual

- La Liga Manager of the Month: December 2013
