= Pape Maly Diamanka =

Senegalese footballer (born 1990)

Pape Diamanka
Personal information
- Full name: Pape Maly Diamanka
- Date of birth: 10 January 1990 (age 36)
- Place of birth: Dakar, Senegal
- Height: 1.84 m (6 ft 0 in)
- Position: Central midfielder

Youth career
- US Gorée

Senior career*
Years	Team	Apps	(Gls)
2007–2009	US Gorée		
2010–2013	Rayo Vallecano B	44	(1)
2011–2013	Rayo Vallecano	7	(0)
2012	→ Vålerenga (loan)	9	(0)
2013–2014	Sestao	29	(2)
2014–2015	Leganés	28	(1)
2015–2016	Zaragoza	25	(3)
2016–2017	Almería	17	(0)
2017–2019	Numancia	66	(11)
2019–2021	Girona	23	(0)
2020–2021	→ Albacete (loan)	27	(2)
2022	Logroñés	11	(0)
2023	Lleida Esportiu	9	(1)
2023–2024	Numancia	19	(0)

International career
2011	Senegal U23	1	(0)
- * Club domestic league appearances and goals as of 2 June 2024

Pape Maly Diamanka (born 10 January 1990) is a Senegalese professional footballer who plays as a central midfielder.

He spent most of his career in Spain after arriving in the country in 2010, starting out at Rayo Vallecano.

== Club career ==
Born in Dakar, Diamanka began his career with local US Gorée. In February 2010 he joined Spanish club Rayo Vallecano, being assigned to the reserves in the Tercera División and being a regular in his first full season, starting 23 games and completing 20 as the Madrid outskirts team retained their Segunda División B status.

On 13 June 2011, Diamanka renewed his contract with a €6 million buyout clause, also being promoted to the main squad for the 2011–12 campaign. He spent several months on the sidelines due to bureaucratic problems.

Diamanka made his competitive debut on 8 January 2012, playing 32 minutes as a substitute in the 2–1 La Liga home win against Sevilla FC. On 23 August, he was loaned to Norway's Vålerenga Fotball for one season with the option for a permanent deal.

After being released by Rayo, Diamanka moved to Salamanca AC but, after the club failed to register, he joined Sestao River Club on 26 August 2013. On 18 July of the following year he signed for CD Leganés, newly promoted to the Segunda División.

Diamanka scored his first professional goal on 21 September 2014, his team's first in a 2–2 home draw against Racing de Santander. On 29 June 2015, he severed his ties and agreed to a three-year deal at Real Zaragoza also in the second tier.

On 22 July 2016, after 15 starts and 1,334 minutes of action, Diamanka terminated his contract and signed a two-year deal with UD Almería of the same league the same day. On 10 August 2017, he moved to fellow second-division CD Numancia as a free agent. He scored a career-best nine goals in 2018–19.

On 5 July 2019, Diamanka signed a three-year contract with Girona FC, recently relegated to division two. On 29 September of the following year, he was loaned to Albacete Balompié in the same tier; in August 2021, he terminated his link to the former.

Diamanka joined UD Logroñés of the newly-formed Primera División RFEF in January 2022.

== International career ==
Diamanka represented Senegal at various youth levels. In August 2011, he was called up by the senior team for a friendly with Morocco in Dakar, but eventually did not make his debut.

== Career statistics ==
As of 15 June 2019

Appearances and goals by club, season and competition
Club	Season	League			Cup		Other		Total	
Club	Season	Division	Apps	Goals	Apps	Goals	Apps	Goals	Apps	Goals
Rayo Vallecano B	2010–11	Segunda División B	26	0	0	0	0	0	26	0
Rayo Vallecano B	2011–12	Segunda División B	0	0	0	0	0	0	0	0
Rayo Vallecano B	2012–13	Segunda División B	5	0	0	0	0	0	5	0
Rayo Vallecano B	Total		31	0	0	0	0	0	31	0
Rayo Vallecano	2011–12	La Liga	7	0	0	0	0	0	7	0
Rayo Vallecano	2012–13	La Liga	0	0	0	0	0	0	0	0
Rayo Vallecano	Total		7	0	0	0	0	0	7	0
Vålerenga (loan)	2012	Tippeligaen	9	0	0	0	0	0	9	0
Sestao	2013–14	Segunda División B	29	2	0	0	4 (Note: Appearances in 2014 Segunda División B play-offs)	1	33	0
Leganés	2014–15	Segunda División	28	1	1	0	0	0	29	1
Zaragoza	2015–16	Segunda División	25	3	0	0	0	0	25	3
Almería	2016–17	Segunda División	17	0	0	0	0	0	17	0
Numancia	2017–18	Segunda División	29	2	1	0	4 (Note: 2018 Segunda División play-offs)	1	34	3
Numancia	2018–19	Segunda División	37	9	0	0	0	0	37	9
Numancia	Total		66	11	1	0	4	1	71	12
Career total			212	17	2	0	8	2	222	19
