= Antoñito (footballer, born 1987) =

Spanish footballer

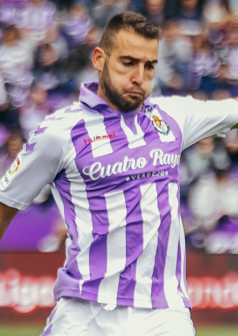
- Antoñito with Valladolid in 2019

Personal information
- Full name: Antonio Jesús Regal Angulo
- Date of birth: 11 December 1987 (age 38)
- Place of birth: Herrera, Spain
- Height: 1.73 m (5 ft 8 in)
- Positions: Right-back; midfielder

Team information
- Current team: Alhaurino

Youth career
- Poli Ejido

Senior career*
Years	Team	Apps	(Gls)
2006–2008	Poli Ejido B	47	(0)
2007–2010	Poli Ejido	67	(6)
2008	→ Melilla (loan)	13	(1)
2010–2011	Almería B	30	(1)
2011–2013	Écija	65	(6)
2013–2014	Cartagena	35	(3)
2014–2016	Albacete	68	(1)
2016–2017	Córdoba	27	(0)
2017–2020	Valladolid	80	(2)
2020–2021	Panathinaikos	0	(0)
2021–2022	Cartagena	21	(0)
2022–2023	Deportivo La Coruña	36	(1)
2023–2024	Recreativo	28	(0)
2025–2026	El Palo	36	(2)
2026–	Alhaurino	10	(0)
- * Club domestic league appearances and goals as of 23:11, 8 November 2026 (UTC)

Antonio Jesús Regal Angulo (born 11 December 1987), commonly known as Antoñito, is a Spanish professional footballer who plays as either a right-back or a midfielder for Tercera Federación club Alhaurino.

== Club career ==
Born in Herrera, Seville, Antoñito graduated from Polideportivo Ejido's youth academy, and made his senior debut in the 2006–07 season with the reserves, in the Tercera División. On 4 November 2007 he played his first match as a professional, coming on as a second-half substitute in a 4–1 Segunda División away loss against UD Salamanca.

On 26 January 2008, Antoñito was loaned to Segunda División B club UD Melilla until June. After returning to Poli he became a regular for the Andalusians, now in the third division.

Antoñito continued to compete in division three the following years, representing UD Almería B, Écija Balompié and FC Cartagena. On 23 June 2014 he signed a two-year contract with Albacete Balompié, newly promoted to the second tier.

Antoñito scored his first professional goal on 6 February 2016, netting his team's second in a 2–2 home draw against Real Oviedo. On 13 July, after suffering relegation, he joined Córdoba CF of the same league.

On 8 July 2017, Antoñito was transferred to Real Valladolid on a three-year deal. He contributed 38 appearances in his first year – play-offs included – helping to a La Liga promotion after four years.

Antoñito made his debut in the Spanish top flight on 27 September 2018, playing 21 minutes in 2–1 home victory over Levante UD. He scored his first goal on 21 October, at Real Betis (1–0). He appeared in 30 matches during the season in a 16th-place finish, and subsequently agreed to an extension until June 2021.

On 26 September 2020, aged 32, Antoñito joined Super League Greece club Panathinaikos F.C. on a two-year contract. The following 14 January, after failing to make an appearance, he returned to his home country with Cartagena, now in the second division.

On 31 January 2022, after only 53 minutes in four league matches, Antoñito terminated his link at the Estadio Cartagonova.
