= Iñigo Pérez =

Spanish footballer (born 1988)

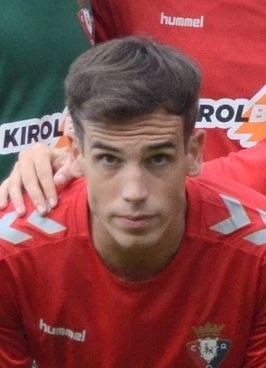
- Pérez with Osasuna in 2018

Personal information
- Full name: Iñigo Pérez Soto
- Date of birth: 18 January 1988 (age 38)
- Place of birth: Pamplona, Spain
- Height: 1.79 m (5 ft 10 in)
- Position: Midfielder

Team information
- Current team: Villarreal (manager)

Youth career
- 2001–2002: Txantrea
- 2002–2006: Athletic Bilbao

Senior career*
Years	Team	Apps	(Gls)
2006–2007	Basconia	38	(8)
2007–2010	Bilbao Athletic	81	(9)
2009–2014	Athletic Bilbao	33	(1)
2011	→ Huesca (loan)	13	(0)
2013–2014	→ Mallorca (loan)	13	(0)
2014–2018	Numancia	138	(4)
2018–2022	Osasuna	75	(4)
Total		391	(26)

Managerial career
- 2022–2023: Rayo Vallecano (assistant)
- 2024–2026: Rayo Vallecano
- 2026–: Villarreal
- * Club domestic league appearances and goals

Iñigo Pérez Soto (born 18 January 1988) is a Spanish former professional footballer who played as a central midfielder. He is the manager of La Liga club Villarreal.

== Playing career ==
A product of Athletic Bilbao's youth ranks at Lezama, Pérez was born in Pamplona, Navarre, and moved to the reserves in early 2007 although he still spent some more time with Basconia, the farm team. On 28 October 2009, he made his debut for the main squad, starting in a 2–0 Copa del Rey defeat at Rayo Vallecano (4–2 aggregate loss). He first appeared in La Liga two days later, replacing veteran Pablo Orbaiz in a 1–0 home win against Atlético Madrid.

Definitely promoted to Athletic's first team for the 2010–11 season, Pérez scored in his first official appearance, a 3–0 home victory over Mallorca, playing the last ten minutes in the place of Iker Muniain. On 8 March 2011, he was loaned to Huesca of the Segunda División; the winter transfer window had long since closed, but the Royal Spanish Football Federation allowed the move as the Aragonese had just lost David Bauzá to an anterior cruciate ligament injury.

Pérez appeared much more regularly for the Basques in the 2011–12 campaign under new manager Marcelo Bielsa, playing 40 games in all competitions mainly due to the departure of Orbaiz (loaned to Olympiacos) and the serious knee injury of Carlos Gurpegui. He spent the first half of 2013–14 on loan at Mallorca, returning on 31 January 2014 due to stress problems.

On 18 July 2014, Pérez joined second division club Numancia after terminating his contract with Athletic. On 2 July 2018, he agreed to a four-year deal with Osasuna of the same league, for a €750,000 fee.

== Coaching career ==
Pérez retired at the end of 2021–22 at the age of 34, having made 85 official appearances during his spell at the El Sadar Stadium. Subsequently, he joined the coaching staff of his former Athletic teammate Andoni Iraola at Rayo Vallecano.

Pérez was supposed to move alongside Iraola to Bournemouth in the Premier League in summer 2023; however, this did not happen due to work permit issues. He returned to the Campo de Fútbol de Vallecas – now as a manager in his own right – on 14 February 2024, following Francisco's dismissal. In his first match four days later, his side drew 1–1 at home to Real Madrid.

In the semi-finals of the 2025–26 UEFA Conference League, Pérez's Rayo disposed of France's Strasbourg 2–0 on aggregate. However, they lost 1–0 to Crystal Palace in the final.

On 1 June 2026, Pérez replaced Marcelino García Toral at the helm of Villarreal on a three-year contract.

== Career statistics ==
Appearances and goals by club, season and competition
Club	Season	League			National cup		Continental		Other		Total	
Club	Season	Division	Apps	Goals	Apps	Goals	Apps	Goals	Apps	Goals	Apps	Goals
Bilbao Athletic	2006–07	Segunda División B	2	0	—		—		—		2	0
Bilbao Athletic	2007–08	Segunda División B	11	0	—		—		—		11	0
Bilbao Athletic	2008–09	Segunda División B	37	3	—		—		—		37	3
Bilbao Athletic	2009–10	Segunda División B	31	6	—		—		—		31	6
Bilbao Athletic	Total		81	9	0	0	0	0	0	0	81	9
Athletic Bilbao	2009–10	La Liga	3	0	1	0	1 (Note: Appearances in UEFA Europa League)	0	—		5	0
Athletic Bilbao	2010–11	La Liga	3	1	1	0	—		—		4	1
Athletic Bilbao	2011–12	La Liga	22	0	9	0	9	0	—		40	0
Athletic Bilbao	2012–13	La Liga	5	0	0	0	4	1	—		9	1
Athletic Bilbao	2013–14	La Liga	0	0	0	0	—		—		0	0
Athletic Bilbao	Total		33	1	11	0	14	1	0	0	58	2
Huesca (loan)	2010–11	Segunda División	13	0	0	0	—		—		13	0
Mallorca (loan)	2013–14	Segunda División	13	0	0	0	—		—		13	0
Numancia	2014–15	Segunda División	35	0	2	0	—		—		37	0
Numancia	2015–16	Segunda División	26	1	1	0	—		—		27	1
Numancia	2016–17	Segunda División	39	1	1	0	—		—		40	1
Numancia	2017–18	Segunda División	38	2	3	0	—		4 (Note: Appearances in La Liga play-offs)	1	45	3
Numancia	Total		138	4	7	0	0	0	4	1	149	5
Osasuna	2018–19	Segunda División	21	1	1	0	—		—		22	1
Osasuna	2019–20	La Liga	22	2	4	1	—		—		26	3
Osasuna	2020–21	La Liga	22	0	3	0	—		—		25	0
Osasuna	2021–22	La Liga	10	1	2	0	—		—		12	1
Osasuna	Total		75	4	10	1	0	0	0	0	85	5
Career total			353	18	28	1	14	1	4	1	399	21

== Managerial statistics ==
As of 22 November 2026

Managerial record by team and tenure
Team	Nat	From	To	Record								Ref
Team	Nat	From	To	G	W	D	L	GF	GA	GD	Win %	Ref
Rayo Vallecano	(Spain)	14 February 2024	1 June 2026	113	44	33	36	140	129	+11	38.94	
Villarreal	(Spain)	1 June 2026	Present	18	6	3	9	32	32	+0	33.33	
Total				131	50	36	45	172	161	+11	38.17	—

== Honours ==
=== Player ===
Athletic Bilbao

- Copa del Rey runner-up: 2011–12
- UEFA Europa League runner-up: 2011–12

Osasuna

- Segunda División: 2018–19

=== Manager ===
Rayo Vallecano

- UEFA Conference League runner-up: 2025–26

Individual

- La Liga Manager of the Month: October 2025
