= Adrián Ripa =

Spanish footballer

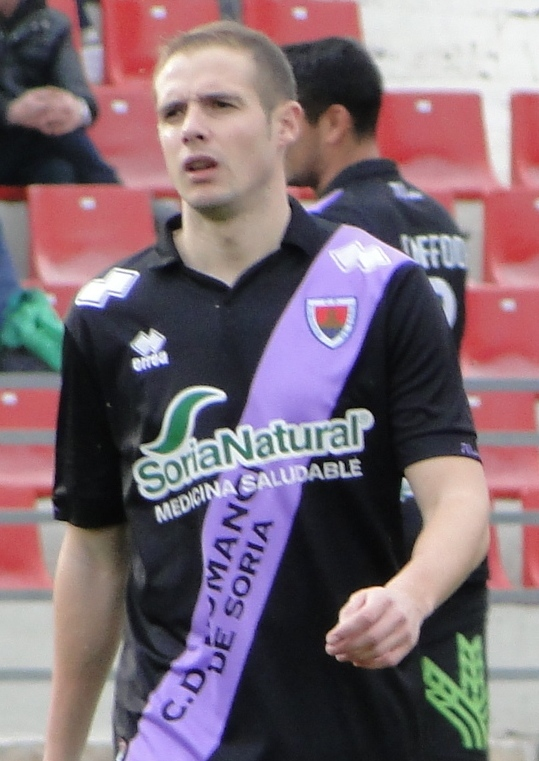
- Ripa with Numancia in 2015

Personal information
- Full name: Adrián Ripa Cruz
- Date of birth: 12 August 1985 (age 41)
- Place of birth: Épila, Spain
- Height: 1.77 m (5 ft 10 in)
- Position: Left-back

Youth career
- SMD Épila
- 1995–2004: Zaragoza

Senior career*
Years	Team	Apps	(Gls)
2004–2008	Zaragoza B	69	(14)
2007–2008	→ Huesca (loan)	33	(2)
2008–2009	Huesca	31	(0)
2009–2010	Orihuela	18	(0)
2010–2011	Elche	42	(0)
2011–2019	Numancia	138	(0)
2020–2022	Tarazona	25	(0)
Total		356	(16)
- * Club domestic league appearances and goals

Adrián Ripa Cruz (born 12 August 1985) is a Spanish former professional footballer who played as a left-back.

He played 211 matches in Segunda División over 11 seasons (no goals), with Huesca, Elche and Numancia.

== Club career ==
Born in Épila, Province of Zaragoza, Aragon, Ripa started his career with Real Zaragoza's reserves. He scored 11 Tercera División goals in the 2006–07 season, but they could not achieve promotion in the playoffs in spite of finishing the regular season in first position.

In 2007, Ripa signed with Segunda División B club SD Huesca on loan. He won promotion in his first year, then made his professional debut in Segunda División on 7 September 2008 by coming on as a late substitute in the 1–1 away draw against Gimnàstic de Tarragona.

Ripa started the 2009–10 campaign back in the third level, with Orihuela CF. During the winter transfer window, however, he returned to the division above after Elche CF paid his €30.000 buyout clause. He played 25 matches in 2010–11, helping his team to the fourth position in the standings and the subsequent playoffs.

On 20 June 2011, Ripa signed a two-year deal at CD Numancia as a free agent. He made 11 second-tier appearances in his first season, as understudy to Nano.

Ripa left the Nuevo Estadio Los Pajaritos in June 2019, as the 34-year-old's contract expired. He then returned to his native region, joining amateurs SD Tarazona.

== Career statistics ==
As of match played 22 May 2021

Appearances and goals by club, season and competition
Club	Season	League			Cup		Continental		Other		Total	
Club	Season	Division	Apps	Goals	Apps	Goals	Apps	Goals	Apps	Goals	Apps	Goals
Zaragoza B	2004–05	Segunda División B	14	0	—		—		—		14	0
Zaragoza B	2005–06	Segunda División B	24	3	—		—		—		24	3
Zaragoza B	2006–07	Tercera División	31	11	—		—		—		31	11
Zaragoza B	Total		69	14	0	0	0	0	0	0	69	14
Huesca	2007–08	Segunda División B	33	2	2	0	—		4 (Note: Appearances in Segunda División B play-offs)	0	39	2
Huesca	2008–09	Segunda División	31	0	0	0	—		—		31	0
Huesca	Total		64	2	2	0	0	0	4	0	70	2
Orihuela	2009–10	Segunda División B	18	0	—		—		—		18	0
Elche	2009–10	Segunda División	17	0	0	0	—		—		17	0
Elche	2010–11	Segunda División	25	0	2	0	—		1 (Note: Appearance in La Liga play-offs)	0	28	0
Elche	Total		42	0	2	0	0	0	1	0	45	0
Numancia	2011–12	Segunda División	11	0	1	0	—		—		12	0
Numancia	2012–13	Segunda División	16	0	1	0	—		—		17	0
Numancia	2013–14	Segunda División	31	0	1	0	—		—		32	0
Numancia	2014–15	Segunda División	26	0	0	0	—		—		26	0
Numancia	2015–16	Segunda División	7	0	1	0	—		—		8	0
Numancia	2016–17	Segunda División	19	0	1	0	—		—		20	0
Numancia	2017–18	Segunda División	20	0	2	0	—		1	0	23	0
Numancia	2018–19	Segunda División	8	0	0	0	—		—		8	0
Numancia	Total		138	0	7	0	0	0	1	0	146	0
Tarazona	2019–20	Tercera División	6	0	0	0	—		—		6	0
Tarazona	2020–21	Segunda División B	7	0	0	0	—		—		7	0
Tarazona	Total		13	0	0	0	0	0	0	0	13	0
Career totals			344	16	11	0	0	0	6	0	361	16
