= Pablo Larrea =

Spanish footballer

Personal information
- Full name: Pablo Guido Larrea Gambara
- Date of birth: 4 February 1994 (age 32)
- Place of birth: Madrid, Spain
- Height: 1.78 m (5 ft 10 in)
- Position: Midfielder

Team information
- Current team: Cartagena
- Number: 10

Youth career
- Atlético Madrid
- 2010–2012: Villarreal

Senior career*
Years	Team	Apps	(Gls)
2012–2015	Villarreal C	69	(2)
2015–2017	Villarreal B	66	(2)
2017–2019	Numancia	29	(0)
2019	→ Ponferradina (loan)	15	(0)
2019–2021	Ponferradina	68	(2)
2021–2023	Tenerife	42	(0)
2023–2025	Real Murcia	32	(0)
2025	Algeciras	13	(0)
2025–	Cartagena	27	(1)
- * Club domestic league appearances and goals as of 10 June 2026

Pablo Guido Larrea Gambara (born 4 February 1994) is a Spanish professional footballer who plays as a central midfielder for Primera Federación club Cartagena.

== Club career ==
Born in Madrid, Larrea represented Villarreal CF as a youth, and made his senior debut with the C-team during the 2011–12 season, in Tercera División. On 27 June 2015, he signed a new two-year contract with the club, being promoted to the reserves in Segunda División B.

On 5 July 2017, Larrea signed a two-year contract with Segunda División club CD Numancia. He made his professional debut on 26 August, coming on as a late substitute for Iñigo Pérez in a 2–2 away draw against Rayo Vallecano.

On 25 January 2019, after being rarely used during the first half of the campaign, Larrea was loaned to SD Ponferradina in the third division, until June. On 15 July, after achieving promotion to the second level, he joined Ponfe permanently.

Larrea scored his first professional goal on 7 September 2019, netting the opener in a 1–1 away draw against CF Fuenlabrada. On 25 August 2021, he moved to fellow second division side CD Tenerife on a one-year deal.

On 16 August 2023, Larrea terminated his contract with Tete.
