= Markel Etxeberria =

Spanish professional footballer

Personal information
- Full name: Markel Etxeberria Mendiola
- Date of birth: 15 February 1995 (age 31)
- Place of birth: Erandio, Spain
- Height: 1.78 m (5 ft 10 in)
- Position: Right back

Team information
- Current team: Sestao River
- Number: 22

Youth career
- 2005–2012: Athletic Bilbao

Senior career*
Years	Team	Apps	(Gls)
2012–2013	Basconia	30	(0)
2013–2018	Bilbao Athletic	74	(1)
2016–2017	→ Valladolid (loan)	5	(0)
2017–2018	→ Numancia (loan)	24	(0)
2018–2019	Numancia	12	(0)
2019–2020	Cartagena	4	(0)
2021	Barakaldo	8	(0)
2021–2022	Eldense	11	(0)
2022–	Sestao River	142	(3)
- * Club domestic league appearances and goals as of 14 May 2026

Markel Etxeberria Mendiola (born 15 February 1995) is a Spanish professional footballer who plays as a right back for Sestao River.

== Career ==
Born in Erandio, Basque Country, Etxeberria began his career in the youth ranks of local Athletic Bilbao. He was registered at their third team CD Basconia and had not yet featured for the reserves when he was called up to their squad for their UEFA Europa League play-off second leg against HJK Helsinki, remaining an unused substitute in a 3–3 draw in the Finnish capital.

He played 35 games in the 2014–15 season, as the team ascended from Segunda División B. After missing the start of the next campaign through injury, on 24 October 2015, Etxeberria made his first appearance in a professional league, starting in a goalless draw at San Mamés against fellow promoted team SD Huesca in Segunda División. He played 30 times in a season which ended in a return to the third tier, scoring his first goal for the team in a 3–2 win at RCD Mallorca the following 7 February.

After signing a new contract to last until 2018, Etxeberria returned to the second division on loan on 27 June 2016, being loaned to Real Valladolid for the upcoming season. After appearing rarely, he moved to fellow league team CD Numancia on 6 July 2017, also in a temporary deal.

On 19 June 2018, after featuring regularly as the Soria side narrowly missed out promotion in the play-offs, Etxeberria was released by Athletic as his contract was due to expire, and remained at Numancia for a further season. After failing to pin down a starting spot at Numancia he had several short term stints with limited playing times at Cartagena, Barakaldo and Eldense before signing for Sestao River in January, 2022.
