= Aitor Fernández (footballer, born 1991) =

Spanish footballer

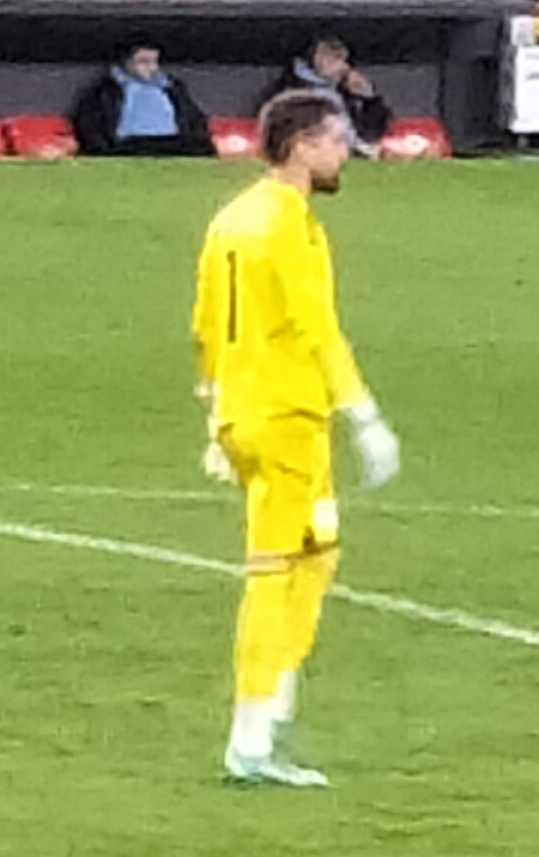
- Fernández in 2024

Personal information
- Full name: Aitor Fernández Abarisketa
- Date of birth: 3 May 1991 (age 35)
- Place of birth: Mondragón, Spain
- Height: 1.82 m (6 ft 0 in)
- Position: Goalkeeper

Team information
- Current team: Osasuna
- Number: 13

Youth career
- 2003–2008: Athletic Bilbao

Senior career*
Years	Team	Apps	(Gls)
2008–2010	Basconia	44	(0)
2010–2013	Bilbao Athletic	30	(0)
2012–2013	→ Barakaldo (loan)	21	(0)
2013–2016	Villarreal B	100	(0)
2016–2018	Numancia	70	(0)
2018–2022	Levante	94	(0)
2022–	Osasuna	37	(0)

International career
2009–2010	Spain U19	6	(0)
2011	Spain U20	3	(0)
2019–2024	Basque Country	2	(0)
- * Club domestic league appearances and goals as of 01:19, 8 November 2026 (UTC)

Aitor Fernández Abarisketa (born 3 May 1991) is a Spanish professional footballer who plays as a goalkeeper for La Liga club Osasuna.

== Club career ==
=== Athletic Bilbao ===
Born in Mondragón, Gipuzkoa, Basque Country, Fernández joined Athletic Bilbao's academy in 2003, aged 12. He made his senior debut for the farm team CD Basconia in 2008, in the Tercera División.

On 29 June 2010, after being promoted to the reserves in the Segunda División B, Fernández was called up to the first team for the preseason as a backup to Gorka Iraizoz and Raúl Fernández. However, he only appeared in 19 matches for the former during the season, mainly due to a hand injury which kept him out for two months, and struggled even more in 2011–12 again due to injuries, being overtaken by new signing Jon Ander Serantes.

Fernández was loaned to Barakaldo CF of the same league on 22 July 2012 for one year, but had his contract with the Lions terminated on 28 January 2013. He signed a two-and-a-half-year deal with Villarreal CF a day later, being assigned to the B side also in the third tier.

=== Numancia ===
On 6 July 2016, Fernández signed for Segunda División club CD Numancia on a two-year contract. He made his professional debut on 4 September 2016, starting in a 1–1 away draw against AD Alcorcón.

Initially a backup to Munir, Fernández profited from national call-ups and became a regular starter, holding that position until the end of the campaign. On 27 February 2017, he extended his link until 2020.

=== Levante ===
Fernández agreed to a four-year contract with La Liga side Levante UD on 23 July 2018. His maiden appearance in the competition took place on 2 February 2019, in a 0–0 home draw with Getafe CF.

In November 2019, it was announced that Fernández might miss Levante's next match as he had been called by his local town to work at a polling station for the Spanish general election, however he was later excused from this. He signed a new deal until 2023 the same month, the new buyout clause being set at €30 million.

=== Osasuna ===
On 2 July 2022, after Levante's relegation, Fernández remained in the top flight on a three-year deal at CA Osasuna, with a release clause of €14 million.

== International career ==
Fernández made his debut for the unofficial Basque Country national team on 30 May 2019, in a 0–0 draw away to Panama for which a small, youthful and inexperienced squad was selected.

== Career statistics ==
As of match played 12 May 2026

Appearances and goals by club, season and competition
Club	Season	League			National Cup		Continental		Other		Total	
Club	Season	Division	Apps	Goals	Apps	Goals	Apps	Goals	Apps	Goals	Apps	Goals
Bilbao Athletic	2010–11	Segunda División B	19	0	—		—		—		19	0
Bilbao Athletic	2011–12	Segunda División B	11	0	—		—		—		11	0
Bilbao Athletic	Total		30	0	—		—		—		30	0
Athletic Bilbao	2010–11	La Liga	0	0	0	0	—		—		0	0
Barakaldo (loan)	2012–13	Segunda División B	21	0	—		—		—		21	0
Villarreal B	2012–13	Segunda División B	8	0	—		—		—		8	0
Villarreal B	2013–14	Segunda División B	34	0	—		—		—		34	0
Villarreal B	2014–15	Segunda División B	21	0	—		—		—		21	0
Villarreal B	2015–16	Segunda División B	37	0	—		—		2	0	39	0
Villarreal B	Total		100	0	—		—		2	0	102	0
Villarreal	2012–13	Segunda División	0	0	—		—		—		0	0
Villarreal	2013–14	La Liga	0	0	—		—		—		0	0
Villarreal	2014–15	La Liga	0	0	0	0	0	0	—		0	0
Villarreal	Total		0	0	0	0	0	0	—		0	0
Numancia	2016–17	Segunda División	29	0	1	0	—		—		30	0
Numancia	2017–18	Segunda División	41	0	1	0	—		4	0	46	0
Numancia	Total		70	0	2	0	—		4	0	76	0
Levante	2018–19	La Liga	16	0	4	0	—		—		20	0
Levante	2019–20	La Liga	36	0	2	0	—		—		38	0
Levante	2020–21	La Liga	29	0	1	0	—		—		30	0
Levante	2021–22	La Liga	13	0	2	0	—		—		15	0
Levante	Total		94	0	9	0	—		—		103	0
Osasuna	2022–23	La Liga	21	0	0	0	—		—		21	0
Osasuna	2023–24	La Liga	7	0	2	0	1	0	0	0	10	0
Osasuna	2024–25	La Liga	1	0	4	0	—		—		5	0
Osasuna	2025–26	La Liga	2	0	4	0	—		—		6	0
Osasuna	Total		31	0	10	0	1	0	0	0	42	0
Career total			346	0	21	0	1	0	6	0	374	0

== Honours ==
Osasuna

- Copa del Rey runner-up: 2022–23

Spain U19

- UEFA European Under-19 Championship runner-up: 2010
