= Gaizka Campos =

Spanish footballer

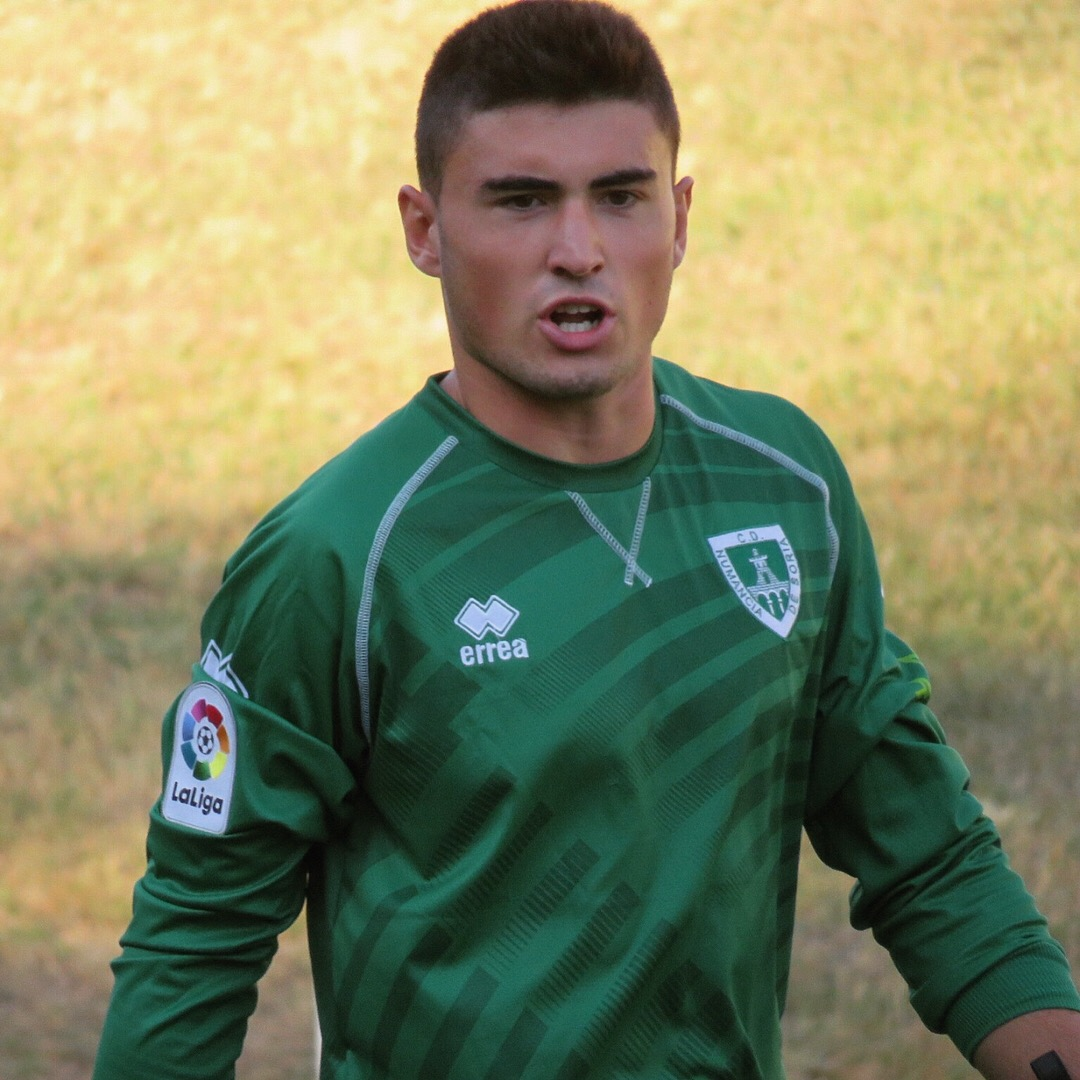

Personal information
- Full name: Gaizka Campos Bahillo
- Date of birth: 16 May 1997 (age 29)
- Place of birth: Barakaldo, Spain
- Height: 1.89 m (6 ft 2 in)
- Position: Goalkeeper

Team information
- Current team: Barakaldo
- Number: 13

Youth career
- Barakaldo
- Retuerto
- 2015–2016: Barakaldo

Senior career*
Years	Team	Apps	(Gls)
2016–2017	Barakaldo	10	(0)
2017–2018	Numancia B	29	(0)
2018–2019	Numancia	2	(0)
2019–2021	Valladolid B	28	(0)
2021–2022	Celta B	32	(0)
2022–2024	Intercity	34	(0)
2024–2025	Amorebieta	10	(0)
2025–	Barakaldo	21	(0)
- * Club domestic league appearances and goals as of 9 June 2026

Gaizka Campos Bahillo (born 16 May 1997) is a Spanish footballer who plays as a goalkeeper for Primera Federación club Barakaldo.

== Club career ==
Campos was born in Barakaldo, Biscay, Basque Country, and joined Barakaldo CF's youth setup in 2015, from neighbouring SD Retuerto Sport. On 23 July 2016, he was promoted to the main squad in Segunda División B, signing a two-year deal.

Initially a backup to Txusta, Campos made his senior debut on 19 February 2017, starting in a 2–1 home win against Arenas Club de Getxo. He finished the season as a starter, contributing with ten appearances.

On 4 July 2017, Campos signed a three-year contract with CD Numancia, as a third-choice behind Aitor Fernández and Munir and being assigned to the reserves in Tercera División. After both departed the club, he was definitely promoted to the main squad and acted as a backup to new signing Juan Carlos.

Campos made his professional debut on 13 September 2018, starting in a 1–2 home loss against Sporting de Gijón, for the season's Copa del Rey. He made his Segunda División debut the following 26 April, playing the full 90 minutes in a home defeat to Deportivo de La Coruña for the same scoreline, as Juan Carlos was suspended.

On 5 July 2019, Campos signed a two-year contract with Real Valladolid B after terminating his previous deal with the Soria club. On 7 July 2021, he moved to another reserve team, Celta de Vigo B in Primera División RFEF.

On 6 July 2022, Campos agreed to a two-year contract with Real Zaragoza in the second division, but the move was declared void just hours later, after the discovery of offensive tweets about the club made in 2013. Thirteen days later, he signed for CF Intercity in the third tier.

On 30 July 2024, Campos joined Amorebieta in the third tier.
