= Unai Medina =

Spanish footballer

Personal information
- Full name: Unai Medina Pérez
- Date of birth: 16 February 1990 (age 36)
- Place of birth: Basauri, Spain
- Height: 1.79 m (5 ft 10 in)
- Position: Right back

Team information
- Current team: Ibiza
- Number: 17

Youth career
- 1999–2000: Laudio
- 2000–2009: Athletic Bilbao

Senior career*
Years	Team	Apps	(Gls)
2008–2009	Basconia	15	(2)
2009–2012	Bilbao Athletic	52	(1)
2012–2013	Barakaldo	32	(5)
2013–2015	Alavés	46	(0)
2015–2019	Numancia	121	(5)
2019–2020	Sporting Gijón	26	(1)
2020–2021	UD Logroñés	29	(0)
2021–2023	Racing Santander	45	(1)
2023–	Ibiza	90	(5)
- * Club domestic league appearances and goals as of 10 June 2026

Unai Medina Pérez (born 16 February 1990) is a Spanish professional footballer who plays as a right back for Ibiza.

== Club career ==
Born in Bilbao, Biscay, Medina grew in local Athletic Bilbao's youth ranks, but could only appear as a senior for its farm and B teams. In 2012, he left the club and joined Basque Country neighbours Barakaldo CF, being first choice in his first and only season.

In July 2013, Medina signed for Deportivo Alavés, recently promoted to the second division. He made his professional debut on 16 August, in a 0–1 away defeat against Girona FC.

Medina moved to fellow league side CD Numancia on 17 June 2015 after signing a three-year deal. He continued competing in the second tier the following years, with Sporting de Gijón and UD Logroñés.

On 26 July 2021, after Logroñés' relegation, Medina moved to third division side Racing de Santander on a two-year contract, and helped in their promotion to the second tier as a starter.
