= Julio Álvarez =

Venezuelan footballer (born 1981)

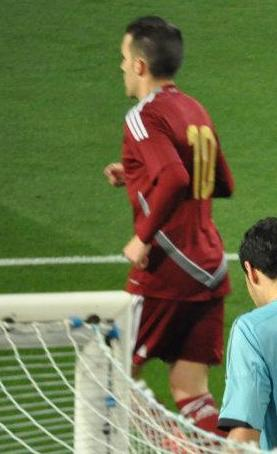
- Álvarez with Venezuela in 2012

Personal information
- Full name: Julio Álvarez Mosquera
- Date of birth: 1 May 1981 (age 45)
- Place of birth: Caracas, Venezuela
- Height: 1.80 m (5 ft 11 in)
- Position: Midfielder

Youth career
- Rayo Sadense
- Ural
- Deportivo La Coruña
- 1998–1999: Real Madrid

Senior career*
| Years | Team | Apps | (Gls) |
| 1999–2000 | Real Madrid C | 28 | (7) |
| 2000 | Real Madrid B | 2 | (2) |
| 2000–2003 | Real Madrid | 0 | (0) |
| 2000–2002 | → Racing Santander (loan) | 44 | (1) |
| 2002–2003 | → Rayo Vallecano (loan) | 26 | (8) |
| 2003–2006 | Murcia | 72 | (7) |
| 2006–2008 | Numancia | 66 | (10) |
| 2008–2009 | Almería | 21 | (0) |
| 2009–2010 | Mallorca | 26 | (6) |
| 2010–2011 | Tenerife | 30 | (3) |
| 2011–2018 | Numancia | 189 | (46) |
| Total | | 504 | (90) |

International career
| 1998 | Spain U16 | 10 | (2) |
| 1998–1999 | Spain U17 | 6 | (1) |
| 1999–2000 | Spain U18 | 5 | (1) |
| 2002–2003 | Spain U21 | 7 | (1) |
| 2011–2012 | Venezuela | 4 | (0) |
| 2005–2007 | Galicia | 3 | (1) |

Managerial career
- 2019–2020: Ponferradina (assistant)
- * Club domestic league appearances and goals

Julio Álvarez Mosquera (born 1 May 1981) is a Venezuelan former professional footballer who played as a midfielder.

He appeared in 98 La Liga games over five seasons (14 goals), representing Racing de Santander, Rayo Vallecano, Murcia, Almería and Mallorca. In addition, he played 376 matches in the Segunda División, mainly at the service of Numancia.

After competing for Spain at youth level, Álvarez represented Venezuela internationally.

== Club career ==
=== Real Madrid ===
A playmaker, Álvarez was born in Caracas and moved to Spain aged 4 to reunite with his parents, settling in Sada, Galicia. He showed early promise while playing for Spain at youth level, winning the 1999 Meridian Cup with the under-17 team and also appearing at the 1998 UEFA European Under-16 Championship (third place). Subsequently, he joined Real Madrid to finish his development but, despite very good performances overall for the B and C sides, could never break into the main squad.

Álvarez was loaned by Real to Racing de Santander for 2000–01. However, he was mostly injured, and could not help the Cantabria team to escape La Liga relegation at the season's end. The following campaign, with 31 matches and one goal, he helped them to quickly return to the top flight.

In July 2002, Álvarez was sent on loan again, to top-tier club Rayo Vallecano where he scored eight times, but again his side was relegated, now as last.

=== Murcia ===
Álvarez signed a four-year contract with Real Murcia CF on 15 July 2003. He suffered an injury before playing any games for his new club, and struggled throughout the vast majority of the season, finishing with 12 just appearances as the side went on to rank 20th in the main division.

Fully recovered, Álvarez went on to be a very important team player, despite a poor year collectively in 2005–06 that almost ended in another relegation – he also established himself as a free kick specialist.

=== Numancia and Almería ===
Álvarez was deemed surplus to requirements in summer 2006 and, on 9 August, he joined CD Numancia on a two-year deal. Playing as an attacking or holding midfielder, he was a regular starter under manager Andoni Goikoetxea; the Sorians won the 2007–08 championship with Goikoetxea's successor Gonzalo Arconada, five points clear of Málaga CF.

Álvarez's contract expired at the end of the season, and UD Almería signed him on a free transfer on 3 July 2008, reuniting him with Arconada.

=== Mallorca and Tenerife ===
After an irregular spell in Andalusia, especially after the arrival of manager Hugo Sánchez, Álvarez was released hours before the transfer deadline in August 2009, and moved to RCD Mallorca shortly after. On 23 July 2010, after helping the Balearic Islands side to finish fifth and qualify for the UEFA Europa League, the 29-year-old signed a three-year contract with CD Tenerife, who had in turn been relegated from the top division.

=== Numancia return ===
On 11 August 2011, Álvarez returned to Numancia after terminating his contract with Tenerife. In the 2014–15 campaign, he scored a career-best 12 goals under Juan Antonio Anquela.

Álvarez agreed to a new three-year deal with the club on 2 March 2017. In April, he suffered an ankle injury which kept him out for 13 months.

=== Coaching ===
On 13 July 2018, the 37-year-old Álvarez announced his retirement from professional football. One year later, he was named Bolo's assistant at SD Ponferradina, recently returned to the second tier.

In February 2024, Álvared was appointed manager of Rayo Ciudad Alcobendas CF' under-19 squad.

== International career ==
Álvarez won 28 caps for Spain across all youth levels. On 14 October 2011, after switching allegiance to his country of birth, the 30-year-old made his debut for Venezuela in a 1–0 home win against Argentina for the 2014 FIFA World Cup qualifiers.

Additionally, Álvarez played three games for the unofficial Galicia team, scoring a penalty in a 1–1 draw with Cameroon at the Balaídos Stadium on 27 December 2007.

== Personal life ==
Álvarez's older brother, Javier (born 1980), was also a footballer and a midfielder. He spent his entire career in Spanish amateur football; in addition, he represented Spain in three FIFA Beach Soccer World Cups (2006, 2007 and 2008).

== Career statistics ==
Appearances and goals by club, season and competition
| Club | Season | League | | |
| Club | Season | Division | Apps | Goals |
|---|---|---|---|---|
| Real Madrid C | 1999–2000 | Tercera División | 28 | 7 |
| Real Madrid B | 2000–01 | Segunda División B | 2 | 2 |
| Racing Santander (loan) | 2000–01 | La Liga | 13 | 0 |
| Racing Santander (loan) | 2001–02 | Segunda División | 31 | 1 |
| Racing Santander (loan) | Total | | 44 | 1 |
| Rayo Vallecano (loan) | 2002–03 | La Liga | 26 | 8 |
| Murcia | 2003–04 | La Liga | 12 | 0 |
| Murcia | 2004–05 | Segunda División | 35 | 5 |
| Murcia | 2005–06 | Segunda División | 25 | 2 |
| Murcia | Total | | 72 | 7 |
| Numancia | 2006–07 | Segunda División | 33 | 4 |
| Numancia | 2007–08 | Segunda División | 33 | 6 |
| Numancia | Total | | 66 | 10 |
| Almería | 2008–09 | La Liga | 21 | 0 |
| Mallorca | 2009–10 | La Liga | 26 | 6 |
| Tenerife | 2010–11 | Segunda División | 30 | 3 |
| Numancia | 2011–12 | Segunda División | 35 | 10 |
| Numancia | 2012–13 | Segunda División | 26 | 4 |
| Numancia | 2013–14 | Segunda División | 41 | 7 |
| Numancia | 2014–15 | Segunda División | 34 | 12 |
| Numancia | 2015–16 | Segunda División | 24 | 9 |
| Numancia | 2016–17 | Segunda División | 29 | 4 |
| Numancia | Total | | 189 | 46 |
| Career total | | | 504 | 90 |

== Honours ==
Numancia

- Segunda División: 2007–08
