= Carlos Gutiérrez (Spanish footballer) =

Spanish footballer (born 1991)

Personal information
- Full name: Carlos Gutiérrez González
- Date of birth: 4 November 1991 (age 35)
- Place of birth: La Laguna, Spain
- Height: 1.92 m (6 ft 4 in)
- Position: Centre back

Team information
- Current team: Numancia
- Number: 16

Youth career
- Tenerife

Senior career*
Years	Team	Apps	(Gls)
2010–2012	Laguna	71	(4)
2012–2014	Las Palmas B	70	(2)
2014–2016	Las Palmas	0	(0)
2014–2015	→ Leganés (loan)	9	(0)
2016	→ Burgos (loan)	17	(0)
2016–2019	Numancia	96	(5)
2020–2021	Avispa Fukuoka	13	(0)
2022	Tochigi SC	36	(4)
2023	FC Machida Zelvia	14	(0)
2023	V-Varen Nagasaki	3	(0)
2024	Huesca	7	(0)
2024–2025	Zamora	19	(1)
2025–	Numancia	17	(1)
- * Club domestic league appearances and goals as of 14 May 2026

Carlos Gutiérrez González (born 4 November 1991), also just known as Carlos, is a Spanish footballer who plays as a central defender for Segunda Federación club Numancia.

== Football career ==
Born in La Laguna, Canary Islands, Gutiérrez finished his graduation with local CD Tenerife's youth setup, and made his senior debuts with lowly CD Laguna de Tenerife in Tercera División. In July 2012 he joined UD Las Palmas Atlético, also in the fourth level.

On 13 July 2014 Gutiérrez signed a new two-year deal with the Amarillos, being definitely promoted to the main squad in Segunda División. On 22 August, however, he was loaned to fellow league team CD Leganés.

On 24 August 2014 v played his first match as a professional, replacing Sergio Postigo in the 78th minute of a 1–1 home draw against Deportivo Alavés. On 13 January 2016, after spending half of the campaign unregistered, he was loaned to Burgos CF until June.

On 19 July 2016, Gutiérrez rescinded his contract, and signed a one-year deal with CD Numancia a day later. He scored his first professional goal on 3 December of the following year by netting the equalizer in a 3–2 away win against Real Valladolid.

On 9 January 2020, Gutiérrez moved abroad and signed a contract with a Japanese club, Avispa Fukuoka. On 25 December 2021, he joined J2 League side Tochigi SC for the 2022 season.

On 25 December 2022, Gutiérrez officially signed a contract with FC Machida Zelvia also in the Japanese second tier for upcoming 2023 season. After a short spell at V-Varen Nagasaki, he returned to his home country on 27 January 2024, signing a short-term deal with SD Huesca in the second level.

On 25 July 2024, Gutiérrez signed with Zamora in the third-tier Primera Federación.

== Career statistics ==
=== Club ===
Updated to the start from 2023 season.

Club performance			League		Cup		League Cup		Total	
Season	Club	League	Apps	Goals	Apps	Goals	Apps	Goals	Apps	Goals
Japan			League		Emperor's Cup		J.League Cup		Total	
2020	Avispa Fukuoka	J2 League	5	0	0	0	-		5	0
2021	Avispa Fukuoka	J1 League	8	0	1	0	5	1	14	1
2022	Tochigi SC	J2 League	36	4	1	0	-		37	4
2023	Machida Zelvia	J2 League	0	0	0	0	-		0	0
Career total			49	4	2	0	5	1	56	5
