= La Liga play-offs =

- Region: Spain
- Teams: 4
- 2026 Segunda División play-offs

The La Liga play-offs are an annual series of football matches to determine the final promotion places within Segunda División and La Liga. In its current format, it involves the four teams that finish directly below the automatic promotion places from Segunda División to the top tier. These teams meet in a series of play-off matches to determine the final team that will be promoted. Reserve teams are not eligible for promotion.

The play-offs were first introduced in 1929 and have been staged at the conclusion of every season since, except between 2000 and 2010. Until 1999, it consisted in games between teams from both leagues, but when it was reinstated, it only involved four teams from Segunda División.

== Results ==
=== 1929 ===
The first edition of La Liga and Segunda División finished with a promotion/relegation playoff between the champion of Segunda División and the last qualified team of La Liga. It was played with a double-leg format and Racing Santander remained in the top tier.

Season	Winners	Losers
1929	Racing Santander	Sevilla

=== 1935–1936 ===
In 1934, the Segunda División was expanded into three groups of 10 teams. The two first qualified teams of each group would play a final stage with a round-robin format. The two top teams, promoted to La Liga.

Season	Winner	Runner-up	Third	Fourth	Fifth	Sixth
1935	Hércules	Osasuna	Celta Vigo	Sabadell	Murcia	Valladolid
1936	Celta Vigo	Zaragoza	Arenas	Murcia	Girona	Xerez

=== 1940–1950 ===
Just after the Spanish Civil War, the 1939–40 Segunda División was expanded into five groups where the winners joined the final stage. The champion promoted directly while the runner-up played a single-game to promote to La Liga.

In the next season, the Segunda División was reduced to two groups of 12 teams where the two top teams joined a final group. In this one, the winner and the runner-up promoted directly while the 3rd and 4th qualified played against the two last qualified teams in La Liga. The two winners achieved the spot for the top tier's next season. From 1945 (one year after the reduction of Segunda División to one only group) to 1947, there was only one promotion/relegation game.

All games were played in a neutral venue.

Season	Winners	Losers
1940	Celta Vigo	Deportivo La Coruña
1941	Castellón	Zaragoza
1941	Deportivo La Coruña	Murcia
1942	Barcelona	Murcia
1942	Oviedo	Sabadell
1943	Español	Real Gijón
1943	Granada	Valladolid
1944	Deportivo La Coruña	Constancia
1944	Español	Alcoyano
1945	Celta Vigo	Granada
1946	Español	Gimnástico
1947	Real Sociedad	Murcia
1950	Alcoyano	Gimnástico
1950	Murcia	Oviedo

=== 1951–1956 ===
For the leagues of the 1950s, when the Segunda División was divided into two groups, a new promotion/relegation system was created. The second and third qualified of each group and the 13th and 14th of La Liga, played by 16 teams, joined a round-robin group where the two top teams would promote to the next La Liga season.

Season	Winner	Runner-up	Third	Fourth	Fifth	Sixth
1951	Las Palmas	Zaragoza	Málaga	Murcia	Sabadell	Salamanca
1952	Mestalla (Note: Despite being the reserve team of Valencia, Mestalla played the tournament achieving a promotion spot. Finally, the RFEF did not allow the club to play in La Liga and Real Santander occupied its berth.)	Real Gijón	Real Santander	Alcoyano	Logroñés	Ferrol
1953	Deportivo La Coruña	España Industrial (Note: Despite being the reserve team of Barcelona, España Industrial played the tournament achieving a promotion spot. Finally, the RFEF did not allow the club to play in La Liga and Celta Vigo occupied its berth.)	Celta Vigo	Atlético Tetuán	Avilés	Hércules
1954	Málaga	Hércules	Osasuna	Baracaldo	Lérida	Jaén
1955	Español	Real Sociedad	Oviedo	Atlético Tetuán	Zaragoza	Granada
1956	España Industrial (Note: For playing La Liga's next season, the club changed its name to CD Condal.)	Zaragoza	Oviedo	Murcia	Real Betis	Alavés

=== 1959–1968 ===
In 1958 the RFEF re-adopted the promotion/relegation play-offs system between teams from La Liga and Segunda División. Teams qualified in positions 13 and 14 of La Liga would face against the 3rd and 4th qualified in Segunda División. The two winners achieved the spot for the top tier's next season.

Season	Winners	Losers
1959	Granada	Sabadell
1959	Las Palmas	Levante
1960	Real Sociedad	Córdoba
1960	Valladolid	Celta Vigo
1961	Elche	Atlético Ceuta
1961	Oviedo	Celta Vigo
1962	Málaga	Real Santander
1962	Valladolid	Español
1963	Español	Mallorca
1963	Levante	Deportivo La Coruña
1964	Español	Real Gijón
1964	Oviedo	Hércules
1965	Málaga	Levante
1965	Sabadell	Murcia
1966	Granada	Málaga
1966	Sabadell	Celta Vigo
1967	Real Betis	Granada
1967	Sevilla	Real Gijón
1968	Córdoba	Calvo Sotelo
1968	Real Sociedad	Valladolid

=== 1987–1999 ===
In 1987 the LFP, with the expansion of La Liga to 20 teams, re-adopted the promotion/relegation play-offs between teams from La Liga and Segunda División. This time, the 17th and 18th qualified teams in La Liga would face the 3rd and 4th position teams of Segunda División, excluding reserve teams, with the team from the higher division usually hosts the second leg. The two winners of the double-legged play-offs would get a place in the next La Liga season. This format worked until 1999, when the LFP removed it and determined that three teams will directly promote or relegate.

In 1997, for reducing the number of teams in La Liga from 22 to 20, there was only one play-off game between the 18th qualified in La Liga and the third one of Segunda.

In gold, teams from La Liga and in silver, teams from Segunda División.

Season	Winners	Losers
1988	Murcia	Rayo Vallecano
1988	Oviedo	Mallorca
1989	Mallorca	Español
1989	Tenerife	Real Betis
1990	Español	Málaga
1990	Tenerife	Deportivo La Coruña
1991	Cádiz	Málaga
1991	Zaragoza	Murcia
1992	Cádiz	Figueres
1992	Deportivo La Coruña	Real Betis
1993	Albacete	Mallorca
1993	Racing Santander	Español
1994	Compostela	Rayo Vallecano
1994	Valladolid	Toledo
1995	Sporting Gijón	Lleida
1995	Salamanca	Albacete (Note: Due to the La Liga expansion to 22 teams, Albacete remained in La Liga despite losing the play-offs.)
1996	Extremadura	Albacete
1996	Rayo Vallecano	Mallorca
1997	Mallorca	Rayo Vallecano
1998	Oviedo	Las Palmas
1998	Villarreal	Compostela
1999	Rayo Vallecano	Extremadura
1999	Sevilla	Villarreal

=== 2011–present ===
For the 2010–11 season, the Segunda División adopted the Football League play-offs format. While the two first qualified teams were directly promoted to La Liga's next season, teams qualified between third and sixth would take part in the play-offs. If a reserve team qualifies in one of these positions, its spot will be transferred to the next best qualified.

Fifth placed faces against the fourth, while the sixth positioned team faces against the third. The final is also two-legged. The best positioned team always plays at home on the second leg.

Since the second edition, a new rule was established: in case of a tied eliminatory there were extra time, once finished it, this season introduced that there would not be penalty shoot-out and the winner would be the best positioned team.

Season	Promoted	Finalist	Semi-finalists
2011	Granada	Elche	Celta Vigo and Valladolid
2012	Valladolid	Alcorcón	Córdoba and Hércules
2013	Almería	Girona	Alcorcón and Las Palmas
2014	Córdoba	Las Palmas	Murcia and Sporting Gijón
2015	Las Palmas	Zaragoza	Girona and Valladolid
2016	Osasuna	Girona	Córdoba and Gimnàstic
2017	Getafe	Tenerife	Cádiz and Huesca
2018	Valladolid	Numancia	Sporting Gijón and Zaragoza
2019	Mallorca	Deportivo La Coruña	Albacete and Málaga
2020	Elche	Girona	Almería and Zaragoza
2021	Rayo Vallecano	Girona	Almería and Leganés
2022	Girona	Tenerife	Eibar and Las Palmas
2023	Alavés	Levante	Albacete and Eibar
2024	Espanyol	Oviedo	Eibar and Sporting Gijón
2025	Oviedo	Mirandés	Almería and Racing Santander
