= Nuevo Estadio Los Pajaritos =

Multi-purpose stadium in Soria, Spain

Los Pajaritos
- Interactive map of Los Pajaritos
- Location: Soria, Spain
- Coordinates: 41°45′16″N 2°28′4″W
- Owner: Ayuntamiento de Soria
- Operator: Ayuntamiento de Soria
- Capacity: 8,261
- Field size: 101 metres (110 yd) x 68 metres (74 yd)

Construction
- Opened: 14 January 1999; 27 years ago

Tenant
- Numancia

Nuevo Estadio Los Pajaritos is a multi-purpose stadium in Soria, Spain. It is currently used mostly for football matches and is the home ground of CD Numancia. The stadium holds 8,261 seats and was built in 1999. It is notoriously cold and over 1,000 metres above sea level, allegedly giving Numancia a strong home advantage in winter.

The move to the new stadium coincided with a rise in CD Numancia fortunes. They were promoted to the Primera in 1999 and spent two seasons there before returning to Segunda A. They returned to the Primera in season 2004-05 but their stay lasted just the one season. They returned to the Primera in season 2007–08. They currently play in the Segunda División B.

Prior to 1999, CD Numancia played at the Estadio Municipal Los Pajaritos. It is a basic athletics stadium with a small cantilevered stand on the west side, adjacent to the new stadium. That was even colder, having fewer wind breaks from the stands, with the suggestion that hot showers were only installed in 1996 at the expense of FC Barcelona, after third-tier Numancia had knocked three other top flight clubs out of the Spanish Cup that year.

In January 2016, a heating system was installed in the stands. It was to be inaugurated on 14 February 2016, in the 2015–16 Segunda División game between Numancia and Mallorca.

== League attendances ==
This is a list of league and playoffs games attendances of Numancia at Nuevo Los Pajaritos.

Season	Total	High	Low	Average
2012–13 Segunda División	62,673	3,853	2,033	2,984
2013–14 Segunda División	65,113	6,207	1,702	3,101
2014–15 Segunda División	61,339	6,305	1,466	2,921
2015–16 Segunda División	61,750	7,606	2,146	2,940
2016–17 Segunda División	61,145	4,571	2,104	2,912
2017–18 Segunda División	93,483	8,068	2,174	4,064
2018–19 Segunda División	69,001	6,069	2,537	3,450
2019–20 Segunda División	56,790	5,734	2,654	3,549
