= 2004–05 CD Tenerife season =

Tenerife
2004–05 season
- Head coach: José Moré Bonet; José Antonio Barrios
- Stadium: Estadio Heliodoro Rodríguez López
- Segunda División: 9th
- Copa del Rey: Round of 32
- Top goalscorer: League: Keko (9); All: Keko (10)

The 2004–05 season was the 92nd season in the existence of CD Tenerife and the club's third consecutive season in the second division of Spanish football. In addition to the domestic league, Tenerife participated in this season's edition of the Copa del Rey. The season covered the period from 1 July 2004 to 30 June 2005.

== Competitions ==
=== Overview ===
Competition	First match	Last match	Starting round	Final position	Record							
Competition	First match	Last match	Starting round	Final position	Pld	W	D	L	GF	GA	GD	Win %
Segunda División	28 August 2004	May 2005	Matchday 1	9th	42	13	18	11	42	45	−3	30.95
Copa del Rey	27 October 2004	10 November 2004	Round of 64	Round of 32	2	1	0	1	4	3	+1	50.00
Total					44	14	18	12	46	48	−2	31.82

Source: Competitions

=== Segunda División ===
==== League table ====
Pos	Team	Pld	W	D	L	GF	GA	GD	Pts
7	Gimnàstic	42	16	12	14	49	45	+4	60
8	Xerez	42	14	17	11	39	36	+3	59
9	Tenerife	42	13	18	11	42	45	−3	57 (Note: TEN: 8 pts; ELC: 4 pts → ELC 4-0 SPG; SPG: 4 pts → SPG 3-1 ELC)
10	Elche	42	16	9	17	51	52	−1	57
11	Sporting Gijón	42	15	12	15	41	39	+2	57

Source: LFP – Liga Adelante
Rules for classification: 1st points; 2nd head-to-head points; 3rd head-to-head goal difference; 4th head-to-head goals scored; 5th goal difference; 6th number of goals scored; 7th Fair-play points

==== Results summary ====
Overall								Home						Away					
Pld	W	D	L	GF	GA	GD	Pts	W	D	L	GF	GA	GD	W	D	L	GF	GA	GD
42	13	18	11	42	45	−3	57	10	7	4	23	19	+4	3	11	7	19	26	−7

Source: Segunda División

==== Results by round ====
Round	1	2	3	4	5	6	7	8	9	10	11	12	13	14	15	16	17	18	19	20	21	22	23	24	25	26	27	28	29	30	31	32	33	34	35	36	37	38	39	40	41	42
Ground	H	A	A	H	A	H	A	H	A	H	A	H	A	H	A	H	A	H	A	H	A	A	H	H	A	H	A	H	A	H	A	H	A	H	A	H	A	H	A	H	A	H
Result	W	L	L	W	D	W	D	D	D	L	L	W	D	W	D	D	L	D	W	D	L	D	L	W	W	D	D	W	D	D	W	D	D	W	L	W	D	W	L	L	D	L
Position	11	13	15	12	13	7	8	9	9	13	14	13	13	12	13	12	14	15	12	14	14	15	16	13	13	12	11	10	11	12	11	10	10	8	11	7	9	6	7	9	9	9

Source: Segunda División
A = Away; H = Home; W = Win; D = Draw; L = Loss

==== Matches ====
28 August 2004 1	Tenerife	1–0	Elche	Santa Cruz de Tenerife
--:-- CEST (UTC+2)				Stadium: Estadio Heliodoro Rodríguez López

4 September 2004 2	Valladolid	2–1	Tenerife	Valladolid
--:-- CEST (UTC+2)				Stadium: Estadio José Zorrilla

11 September 2004 3	Alavés	1–0	Tenerife	Vitoria-Gasteiz
--:-- CEST (UTC+2)				Stadium: Mendizorrotza Stadium

19 September 2004 4	Tenerife	1–0	Ciudad de Murcia	Santa Cruz de Tenerife
--:-- CEST (UTC+2)				Stadium: Estadio Heliodoro Rodríguez López

25 September 2004 5	Pontevedra	1–1	Tenerife	Pontevedra
--:-- CEST (UTC+2)				Stadium: Pasarón

3 October 2004 6	Tenerife	2–1	Terrassa	Santa Cruz de Tenerife
--:-- CEST (UTC+2)				Stadium: Estadio Heliodoro Rodríguez López

10 October 2004 7	Xerez	1–1	Tenerife	Jerez de la Frontera
--:-- CEST (UTC+2)				Stadium: Chapín

16 October 2004 8	Tenerife	1–1	Eibar	Santa Cruz de Tenerife
--:-- CEST (UTC+2)				Stadium: Estadio Heliodoro Rodríguez López

23 October 2004 9	Lleida	1–1	Tenerife	Lleida
--:-- CEST (UTC+2)				Stadium: Camp d'Esports

31 October 2004 10	Tenerife	1–3	Almería	Santa Cruz de Tenerife
--:-- CET (UTC+1)				Stadium: Estadio Heliodoro Rodríguez López

6 November 2004 11	Gimnàstic	1–0	Tenerife	Tarragona
--:-- CET (UTC+1)				Stadium: Nou Estadi

14 November 2004 12	Tenerife	1–0	Sporting Gijón	Santa Cruz de Tenerife
--:-- CET (UTC+1)				Stadium: Estadio Heliodoro Rodríguez López

20 November 2004 13	Recreativo	0–0	Tenerife	Huelva
--:-- CET (UTC+1)				Stadium: Nuevo Colombino

28 November 2004 14	Tenerife	2–1	Real Murcia	Santa Cruz de Tenerife
--:-- CET (UTC+1)				Stadium: Estadio Heliodoro Rodríguez López

4 December 2004 15	Celta Vigo	1–1	Tenerife	Vigo
--:-- CET (UTC+1)				Stadium: Balaídos

11 December 2004 16	Tenerife	1–1	Racing Ferrol	Santa Cruz de Tenerife
--:-- CET (UTC+1)				Stadium: Estadio Heliodoro Rodríguez López

18 December 2004 17	Cádiz	4–1	Tenerife	Cádiz
--:-- CET (UTC+1)				Stadium: Ramón de Carranza

22 December 2004 18	Tenerife	1–1	Málaga B	Santa Cruz de Tenerife
--:-- CET (UTC+1)				Stadium: Estadio Heliodoro Rodríguez López

8 January 2005 19	Salamanca	4–5	Tenerife	Villares de la Reina
--:-- CET (UTC+1)				Stadium: Helmántico

16 January 2005 20	Tenerife	1–1	Poli Ejido	Santa Cruz de Tenerife
--:-- CET (UTC+1)				Stadium: Estadio Heliodoro Rodríguez López

22 January 2005 21	Córdoba	2–0	Tenerife	Córdoba
--:-- CET (UTC+1)				Stadium: Nuevo Arcángel

29 January 2005 22	Elche	0–0	Tenerife	Elche
--:-- CET (UTC+1)				Stadium: Estadio Manuel Martínez Valero

6 February 2005 23	Tenerife	0–2	Valladolid	Santa Cruz de Tenerife
--:-- CET (UTC+1)				Stadium: Estadio Heliodoro Rodríguez López

12 February 2005 24	Tenerife	1–0	Alavés	Santa Cruz de Tenerife
--:-- CET (UTC+1)				Stadium: Estadio Heliodoro Rodríguez López

19 February 2005 25	Ciudad de Murcia	0–1	Tenerife	Murcia
--:-- CET (UTC+1)				Stadium: Estadio de La Condomina

27 February 2005 24	Tenerife	0–0	Pontevedra	Santa Cruz de Tenerife
--:-- CET (UTC+1)				Stadium: Estadio Heliodoro Rodríguez López

5 March 2005 27	Terrassa	0–0	Tenerife	Terrassa
--:-- CET (UTC+1)				Stadium: Estadi Olímpic de Terrassa

12 March 2005 28	Tenerife	1–0	Xerez	Santa Cruz de Tenerife
--:-- CET (UTC+1)				Stadium: Estadio Heliodoro Rodríguez López

19 March 2005 29	Eibar	0–0	Tenerife	Eibar
--:-- CET (UTC+1)				Stadium: Ipurua

27 March 2005 30	Tenerife	1–1	Lleida	Santa Cruz de Tenerife
--:-- CEST (UTC+2)				Stadium: Estadio Heliodoro Rodríguez López

3 April 2005 31	Almería	0–1	Tenerife	Almería
--:-- CEST (UTC+2)				Stadium: Estadio de los Juegos Mediterráneos

9 April 2005 32	Tenerife	0–0	Gimnàstic	Santa Cruz de Tenerife
--:-- CEST (UTC+2)				Stadium: Estadio Heliodoro Rodríguez López

16 April 2005 33	Sporting Gijón	1–1	Tenerife	Gijón
--:-- CEST (UTC+2)				Stadium: El Molinón

24 April 2005 34	Tenerife	2–0	Recreativo	Santa Cruz de Tenerife
--:-- CEST (UTC+2)				Stadium: Estadio Heliodoro Rodríguez López

1 May 2005 35	Murcia	1–0	Tenerife	Murcia
--:-- CEST (UTC+2)	Richi 20'			Stadium: Estadio de La Condomina; Referee: Manuel Castillo Estévez

7 May 2005 36	Tenerife	3–1	Celta Vigo	Santa Cruz de Tenerife
--:-- CEST (UTC+2)				Stadium: Estadio Heliodoro Rodríguez López

14 May 2005 37	Racing Ferrol	2–2	Tenerife	Ferrol
--:-- CEST (UTC+2)				Stadium: A Malata

21 May 2005 38	Tenerife	2–0	Cádiz	Santa Cruz de Tenerife
--:-- CEST (UTC+2)	Gavilán 34', 41'			Stadium: Estadio Heliodoro Rodríguez López; Referee: Alfonso Javier Álvarez Izquierdo

28 May 2005 39	Málaga B	2–1	Tenerife	Málaga
--:-- CEST (UTC+2)				Stadium: La Rosaleda

5 June 2005 40	Tenerife	1–4	Salamanca	Santa Cruz de Tenerife
--:-- CEST (UTC+2)				Stadium: Estadio Heliodoro Rodríguez López

12 June 2005 41	Poli Ejido	2–2	Tenerife	El Ejido
--:-- CEST (UTC+2)				Stadium: Estadio Municipal Santo Domingo

18 June 2005 42	Tenerife	0–2	Córdoba	Santa Cruz de Tenerife
--:-- CEST (UTC+2)				Stadium: Estadio Heliodoro Rodríguez López

=== Copa del Rey ===
27 October 2004 Round of 64	Tenerife	3–1 (a.e.t.)	Celta Vigo	Santa Cruz de Tenerife
--:-- CEST (UTC+2)				Stadium: Estadio Heliodoro Rodríguez López

10 November 2004 Round of 32	Tenerife	1–2	Real Madrid	Santa Cruz de Tenerife
--:-- CET (UTC+1)				Stadium: Estadio Heliodoro Rodríguez López
