= Adaro =

Adaro may refer to:

== People ==
- Luis Adaro Magro (1849–1915), Spanish engineer and businessman
- Luis Adaro Porcel (1883–1948), Spanish football pioneer
- Adaro (DJ), stage name of 21st century Dutch hardstyle DJ and producer Thijs Ploegmakers

== Companies ==
- Adaro (company), a Spanish aircraft manufacturer
- Adaro Energy, an Indonesian coal mining company

== Other uses ==
- Adaro (mythology), spirits in the mythology of the Solomon Islands
- Adaro (band), German medieval folk rock band
