= Luis Adaro =

Luis Adaro may refer to:

- Luis Adaro Magro (1849–1915), Spanish engineer and businessman
- Luis Adaro Porcel (1883–1948), Spanish football pioneer
