= Ismael Figaredo =

Spanish mining entrepreneur and sports leader

Personal information
- Full name: Ismael Figaredo Herrero
- Date of birth: 17 June 1887
- Place of birth: Mieres, Spain
- Date of death: 11 December 1964 (aged 77)
- Place of death: Gijón, Spain

Senior career*
Years	Team	Apps	(Gls)
1902–1905	Gijón Sport		
5th president of Sporting de Gijón
In office 1921–1928
Preceded by	Enrique Guisasola
Succeeded by	Roberto González de Agustina
- * Club domestic league appearances and goals

Ismael Figaredo Herrero (17 June 1887 – 11 December 1964) was a Spanish mining entrepreneur and sports leader who served as the 5th president of Sporting de Gijón from 1921 until 1928.

== Early life and education ==
Ismael Figaredo was born in Mieres, Asturias, on 17 June 1887. As the son of a well-off family, Figaredo was sent abroad to complete his studies in Belgium, where he developed a deep interest in football, and he went on to play a key role in the introduction of this sport in Asturias.

== Sporting career ==
Figaredo began playing football at the San Lorenzo beach with a group of friends, most of whom he had met during his time as students abroad, such as Luis Adaro Porcel and the Alvargonzálezes (Juan and his cousins, José Luis and Romualdo). In 1902, this group of pioneers founded the first football club in Gijón, Gijón Sport, a multi-sport and cultural club that provided shelter for other disciplines, such as pedestrianism, cycling, chess, and theatre.

=== President of Sporting de Gijón ===
In 1921, the 34-year-old Figaredo was elected as the 5th president of Sporting de Gijón (replacing Enrique Guisasola), a position that he held for seven years, until 1928, when he was replaced by Roberto González de Agustina. Shortly after becoming president, the club played some friendly matches against the Swiss club Berna FC, and having been impressed by its tactics, Figaredo, who had studied in Belgium and thus spoke French perfectly, decided to ask their coach, the French-speaking Austrian Karl Orth, to stay and coach Sporting, personally leading the negotiations to sign him. Orth only accepted the offer after Figaredo agreed with a series of demands, including renting him a house near the stadium and opening a gym for the club, which he placed under the direction of former French boxer Frank Hoche. Orth also demanded for training sessions to always take place behind closed doors, so the club published a note in the press announcing the prohibition of its members from attending them, which caused deep discomfort among the fans. Orth stayed two seasons in Gijón, from 1921 to 1923, leading the club to Asturian regional championship on both occasions.

During his presidency, the club began wearing a new emblem that served as the forerunner for the current one, and which was reproduced in ceramics on the main door of the recently renovated El Molinón. This emblem was composed by red and white stripes, a configuration that had first appeared on the shirts of Gijón Sport, a team for whom Figaredo had played, like several of his fellow board members. In 1924, Manuel Meana, who had become the first Sporting player to represent the Spanish football team as well as the first footballer to undergo a meniscus surgery, ended up tearing the meniscus in his other knee, and this time he refused to return to the operating room, so as not to harm his work at the factory, but Figaredo told him not to worry because he was a member of that factory's management.

In 1927, Figaredo named the Virgin of Covadonga as the new Patron Saint of his club, in gratitude for their sporting successes, having just won the Asturian championship and reached the quarter-finals of the 1927 Copa del Rey. Since then, Sporting has made an annual official visit to the Santina de Asturias, to give thanks for the successes of the past and pray for the coming season.

== Later life ==
Following the death of his father in 1918, his eldest son Vicente, a mining engineer from the University of Liège, took charge of the family businesses, diversifying them into banking and shipping activities. In the mid-1910s, the Figaredo family acquired the Bauer estate, and a few years later, in 1921, Figaredo also acquired La Riega, whose garden was similar to that of Bauer. Ismael already owned a car as early as 1920. During the Spanish Civil War, La Riega was used as a field hospital; in 1965, it was used as a set for the film "Jandro", and years later, Ismael himself converted the central hall into a private Sunday cinema for family and friends.

During the fiscal year of 1933, Figaredo's income was taxed and declared to the Public Revenue Administration of Oviedo. At some point during Francoist Spain, he was affiliated to the Popular Action in Asturias.

On 6 March 1943, Figaredo replaced his brother Isaac as the new director of the Minas de Figaredo S.A., a company that mined with slope floors within a mountain mining system until 1950, when two wells were deepened, San Inocencio and San Vicente, which multiplied the workforce and production almost tenfold.

== Death ==
Figaredo died in Gijón on 11 December 1964, at the age of 77.
