= Xavier Moré =

Spanish footballer

Xavi Moré
Personal information
- Full name: Xavier Moré Roca
- Date of birth: 7 June 1982 (age 44)
- Place of birth: Barcelona, Spain
- Height: 1.84 m (6 ft 1/2 in)
- Position: Midfielder

Youth career
- 1998–2001: Valladolid

Senior career*
Years	Team	Apps	(Gls)
2001–2004	Valladolid B	30	(12)
2002–2005	Valladolid	22	(0)
2005–2007	Castellón	69	(3)
2007–2009	Pontevedra	69	(11)
2009–2013	Oviedo	102	(17)
2013–2014	Noja	12	(1)
2014	Burgos	7	(0)
2014–2017	Palencia	101	(21)
Total		412	(65)
- * Club domestic league appearances and goals

Xavier 'Xavi' Moré Roca (born 7 June 1982) is a Spanish former professional footballer who played as a right midfielder.

== Club career ==
Born in Barcelona, Catalonia, Moré first played professionally for Real Valladolid (where he was coached by his father José), but managed only seven La Liga appearances from 2002 to 2004. On 19 January 2005, he had arguably his best moment with the Castile and León club, scoring in a 1–1 away draw against Real Madrid in that season's Copa del Rey and being essential as his team progressed to the quarter-finals on the away goals rule.

Moré then signed for CD Castellón, being an undisputed starter for the Segunda División side and also being managed by his father, after which he moved to Pontevedra CF in the Segunda División B. On 4 August 2009, when his contract with the Galicians expired, he joined another club in the third tier, Real Oviedo.
