= Barbachano =

Barbachano is a Mexican surname. Notable people with the surname include:

- Miguel Barbachano (1807–1859), Mexican liberal politician
- Manuel Barbachano Ponce (1925–1994), Mexican film producer, director, and screenwriter
- Fernando Cámara Barbachano (1919–2007), Mexican academic, museologist, ethnologist, and social anthropologist.
- Conrado Pineda Barbachano (died 1953), Spanish consular and footballer
