= Ferenc Plattkó =

Football player (1898–1982)

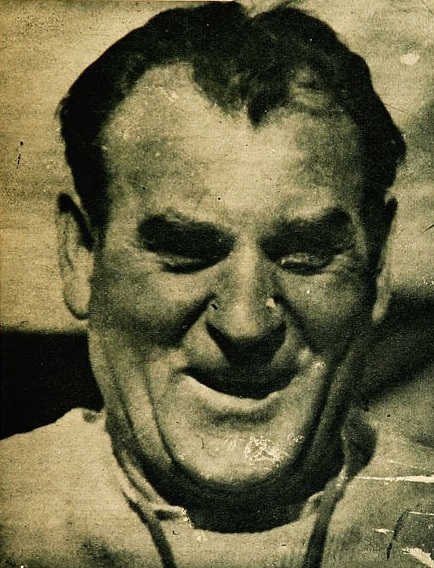
- Plattkó in 1946

Personal information
- Date of birth: 2 December 1898
- Place of birth: Budapest, Austria-Hungary
- Date of death: 2 September 1983 (aged 84)
- Place of death: Santiago, Chile
- Position: Goalkeeper

Senior career*
Years	Team	Apps	(Gls)
1916–1919	Vasas	29	(3)
1919	Wiener AF	7	(0)
1920	Vasas	3	(0)
1921–1922	KAFK		
1922–1923	MTK	17	(0)
1923–1930	Barcelona	17	(0)
1930	Ripensia Timișoara		
1931	Onuba		
1932	Basel		
1933	Mulhouse		

International career
1917–1923	Hungary	6	(0)

Managerial career
- 1932: Basel (assistant)
- 1932–1933: Mulhouse
- 1933–1934: Roubaix
- 1934–1935: Barcelona
- 1935: Académico do Porto
- 1936: USA Olympic
- 1936–1937: Venus București
- 1937: Dacia Unirea Brăila
- 1937: Gloria CFR Galați
- 1938: Cracovia
- 1938–1939: Celta Vigo
- 1939–1940: Colo-Colo
- 1940: River Plate
- 1941: Colo-Colo
- 1941–1945: Chile
- 1942: Magallanes
- 1942–1943: Santiago Wanderers
- 1943–1944: River Plate (techn. director)
- 1949: Boca Juniors
- 1950: Chile
- 1953: Colo-Colo
- 1953: Chile
- 1955–1956: Barcelona
- 1965: San Luis
- * Club domestic league appearances and goals

Ferenc Plattkó (2 December 1898 – 2 September 1983), also known as Franz or Francisco (in Spain his mothers maiden name "Kopiletz" has been appended according to local customs) was a Hungarian footballer and manager. During the 1910s and 1920s he played as a goalkeeper for Vasas SC, WAC Vienna, KAFK Kula, MTK Hungária FC, FC Barcelona, and Recreativo de Huelva.

He subsequently worked as a coach in Europe and South America, most notably with FC Barcelona, Colo-Colo, River Plate, Boca Juniors and Chile. Plattkó was an early FC Barcelona great and was a team-mate of Paulino Alcántara, Josep Samitier and Sagibarba. His bravery as a goalkeeper was immortalized by Rafael Alberti in the poem Oda A Platko. After retiring as a player he returned to the club as a coach on two occasions (1934–35, 1955–56). Plattkó played 6 matches for the Hungarian national team between 1917 and 1923.

== Career ==
=== Early career ===
Born in Budapest, Hungary, Plattkó began his career as a goalkeeper in his hometown of Budapest with local club Vasas SC in 1916. After a brief spell in Austria at Wiener AF in 1919, he returned to Vasas until the end of the 1919–20 season. Between 1917 and 1923, Plattkó also played six games for Hungary. In the 1921–22 season he was the coach and goalkeeper for KAFK from Kula, Serbia where he won the Subotica subassociation championship earning promotion to the Second League of the Kingdom of Serbs, Croats and Slovenes. In 1922 MTK played two friendlies against Barcelona. Both games finished as 0–0 draws and Barcelona, impressed with Plattkó offered him a contract.

=== Barcelona ===
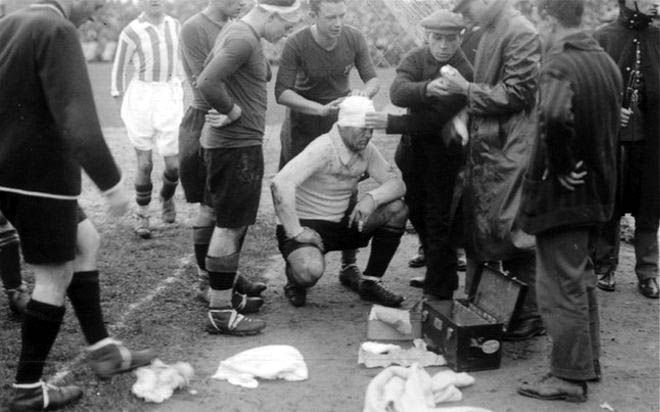
An injured Plattko during the 1928 Copa del Rey final v Real Sociedad inspired poet Rafael Alberti to write his Ode to Plattko

Plattkó replaced the highly rated Ricardo Zamora, but soon established himself as a great in his own right. He spent seven years at Barcelona between 1923 and 1930. During that time he won six Campionat de Catalunya titles, three Copa del Rey and the first ever La Liga title. The poem Oda A Platko came about following the Copa del Rey final in 1928. Barcelona took three games to beat Real Sociedad and during the first encounter on 20 May, Rafael Alberti was so impressed with the bravery of Plattkó that he later wrote the poem in his honour. Plattkó finished his playing career at Recreativo de Huelva and retired as a player in 1931. He soon began his career as a coach, working in France with Mulhouse (1932–33) and Racing Club de Roubaix (1933–34), before returning to Barcelona as a coach for the 1934–35 season. Despite guiding the club to another Campionat de Catalunya, the following season he was replaced by Patrick O'Connell. After two decades away from the club Plattkó was reappointed coach of Barcelona for the 1955–56 season. During this season the club, inspired by Ladislao Kubala and Luis Suárez, won 10 consecutive La Liga games in a row. The record remained unbeaten until 2005. Despite this run Barcelona only managed to finish second in La Liga behind Athletic Bilbao and Plattkó was replaced the following season.

=== South America ===
During the two decades away from Barcelona established himself as a coach in South America. In 1939, during the first of three spells at Colo-Colo he guided the club to the Chilean Primera División. In 1940 he had a spell in charge of River Plate in Argentina before he returned to Chile and Colo-Colo in 1941, winning a second Chilean Primera División. In 1941 he took charge of the Chile national team and continued as national team manager until 1945, coaching the team at both the South American Championship in both 1942 and 1945. During 1942 he also coached two other Chilean clubs, Club Magallanes and Santiago Wanderers. In 1949 he coached Boca Juniors and in 1953 he returned to Colo-Colo for a third time and won a third Chilean Primera División.

For the 1955–56 season he returned to Barcelona with which he became runner up in the league one point behind Athletic Bilbao. His balance of 22 wins three draws and five defeats had been the best for the club yet. The series of ten straight wins in the league was only outdone under Frank Rijkard in the 2005–06 season. His downfall was a 3–1 defeat on 20 May in the cup quarterfinals against local rivals Español. The club concluded, the relationship between the team and Plattkó was broken, and replaced him for the return match, which ended 4-4, with Josep Samitier.

The next years Plattkó spent in Brazil as talent scout and player observer. later he returned to Chile where in 1965 he took on a last coaching assignment when he took on lowly first division outfit CD San Luis de Quillota from the region of Valparaíso, with which he ended third from the bottom, which however was one up from the previous season.

== Personal life and death ==
=== The Plattkó Brothers ===
Ferenc Plattkó also had two brothers, István Plattkó and Károly Plattkó who followed him to Spain and subsequently established themselves as coaches. Esteban coached, among others Real Valladolid (1928–31, 1934–40), Granada CF (1943–45) and RCD Mallorca while Carlos coached Real Valladolid (1941–43), Celta de Vigo (1944–46), Girona FC (1948–49) and Sporting de Gijón.

Plattkó died in Santiago, Chile on 2 September 1983.

== Honours ==
=== Player ===
Barcelona

- La Liga: 1928–29
- Copa del Rey: 1925, 1926, 1928
- Catalan Champions: 1923–24, 1924–25, 1925–26, 1926–27, 1927–28, 1929–30

=== Manager ===
Barcelona

- Catalan Champions: 1934–35

Venus București

- Divizia A: 1936–37

Colo-Colo

- Primera División: 1939, 1941, 1953

== Literature ==
- Tamás Dénes, Mihály Sándor, Éva B. Bába: A magyar labdarúgás története I.: Amatorök és álamatorök (1897–1926), Campus Kiadó (Debreceni Campus Nonprofit Közhasznú Kft.), Debrecen (HU), 2014. ISBN 978-963-9822-11-5
