= Anselmo López =

Anselmo López is the name of:

- Anselmo López (musician) (1934–2016), Venezuelan musician
- Anselmo López (basketball) (1910–2004), Spanish basketball coach and administrator, member of the FIBA Hall of Fame
- Anselmo López (footballer) (1891–1919), founding president of Sporting de Gijón
