= Brain Chinedu =

Nigerian footballer (born 2004)

Personal information
- Full name: Brain Uwalakaji Chinedu
- Date of birth: 17 December 2004 (age 21)
- Place of birth: Umuaka, Nigeria
- Height: 1.94 m (6 ft 4 in)
- Position: Forward

Team information
- Current team: Valladolid B
- Number: 9

Youth career
- Emmydinho FC
- 2023: Líšeň
- 2023–2024: Emmydinho FC

Senior career*
Years	Team	Apps	(Gls)
2024–2025	BSK Bijelo Brdo	6	(0)
2024–2025	→ Radnički Dalj (loan)	8	(3)
2026–	Valladolid B	14	(8)
2026–	Valladolid	1	(0)
- * Club domestic league appearances and goals as of 26 November 2025

Brain Uwalakaji Chinedu (born 17 December 2004), sometimes known as Brain Obosso, is a Nigerian footballer who plays as a forward for Spanish club Real Valladolid Promesas.

== Career ==
Born in Umuaka, Chinedu played for local side Emmydinho FC, and also had a short stint at Czech side SK Líšeň as a youth. In August 2024, he moved to Croatian Prva NL side NK BSK Bijelo Brdo, signing a three-year deal with the club.

Rarely used by the side, Chinedu began appearing with affiliate side NK Radnički Dalj in November 2024, playing in the Treća NL. In August 2025, he left Bijelo Brdo to join Spanish side CF Talavera de la Reina, but the move did not materialize.

On 1 February 2026, Chinedu was announced at Real Valladolid on a three-and-a-half-year contract, being initially assigned to the reserves in Segunda Federación. Six days later, he scored a hat-trick for the B-side in a 7–2 home routing of Real Ávila CF.

Despite only featuring in 14 matches, Chinedu scored eight goals for Promesas, and made his first team debut on 31 May 2026, coming on as a late substitute for Stipe Biuk in a 1–0 Segunda División away loss to UD Almería.
