= Tomy Fernández =

Spanish footballer (born 2006)

Personal information
- Full name: Tomás Fernández Sabatini
- Date of birth: 16 July 2006 (age 20)
- Place of birth: Madrid, Spain
- Position: Forward

Team information
- Current team: Valladolid B
- Number: 9

Youth career
- 2019–2024: Atlético Chopera
- 2024–2025: Unión Adarve

Senior career*
Years	Team	Apps	(Gls)
2024–2025	Unión Adarve	17	(2)
2025–	Valladolid B	25	(4)
2026	→ Coria (loan)	12	(3)
2026–	Valladolid	1	(0)
- * Club domestic league appearances and goals as of 25 October 2026

Tomás "Tomy" Fernández Sabatini (born 16 July 2006) is a Spanish footballer who plays as a forward for Real Valladolid Promesas.

== Career ==
Born in Madrid, Fernández represented Atlético Chopera Alcobendas 04 and AD Unión Adarve as a youth before making his senior debut with the latter in 2024, in Segunda Federación. On 29 May 2025, he agreed to a three-year deal with Real Valladolid, being assigned to the reserves also in the fourth division.

On 2 February 2026, after being rarely used, Fernández was loaned to fellow fourth tier side CD Coria, until June. After helping the club to achieve promotion to Primera Federación, he returned to Pucela and established himself as a regular starter for the B-team before making his professional debut on 23 October, coming on as a late substitute for Adrián Arnu in a 2–1 Segunda División away loss to Granada CF.
