= Károly Plattkó =

Hungarian football manager (1896–?)

Personal information
- Full name: Károly Plattkó Kopiletz
- Date of birth: 16 June 1896
- Place of birth: Budapest, Hungary
- Place of death: Spain

Managerial career
- Years: Team
- 1926–1927: Sans
- 1927–1929: Iberia
- 1929–1931: Castellón
- 1934–1935: Sporting Gijón
- 1941–1943: Real Valladolid
- 1943–1944: Recreativo de Huelva
- 1944–1946: Celta Vigo
- 1947–1948: Igualada
- 1948–1949: Girona
- 1950–1951: Ponferradina

Károly Plattkó (born 16 June 1896), also known as Carlos Platko, was a Hungarian football player and manager who coached Castellón, Sporting Gijón, Real Valladolid, Recreativo de Huelva, Celta Vigo, Girona and Ponferradina in Spain. His brothers were Ferenc Plattkó and István Plattkó.
