= Francisco Lesmes =

Spanish footballer

Personal information
- Full name: Francisco Lesmes Bobed
- Date of birth: 4 March 1924
- Place of birth: Ceuta, Spain
- Date of death: 11 August 2005 (aged 81)
- Position: Defender

Youth career
- Imperio de Ceuta
- África Ceutí

Senior career*
| Years | Team | Apps | (Gls) |
| 1943–1947 | SD Ceuta | 35 | (4) |
| 1947–1949 | Granada | 50 | (1) |
| 1949–1961 | Valladolid | 279 | (2) |
| Total | | 364 | (7) |

International career
| 1954 | Spain | 1 | (0) |

Managerial career
- 1961–1962: Valladolid
- 1963–1964: Valladolid
- * Club domestic league appearances and goals

Francisco Lesmes Bobed (4 March 1924 – 11 August 2005) was a Spanish footballer who played as a defender.

== Club career ==
Born in Ceuta, Lesmes started out as a senior at SD Ceuta and Granada CF, signing with Real Valladolid in 1949 and going on to play the remainder of his career with the Castile and León side. Eleven of his 12 seasons were spent in La Liga.

Lesmes retired in 1961 at the age of 37, appearing in 316 competitive matches with his main club and scoring three goals. As he was still part of the squad in 1960–61 he started working as a manager with the team, being in charge for seven games (four wins) as the campaign ended in top-tier relegation.

Lesmes also managed Valladolid in 1963–64, meeting the same fate. He was in charge of the Estadio Nuevo José Zorrilla stadium's maintenance from 1988 to 1996.

== International career ==
On 6 January 1954, Lesmes earned his only cap with the Spain national team, in a 4–1 home victory against Turkey for the 1954 FIFA World Cup qualifiers.

== Personal life and death ==
Lesmes' younger brother, Rafael, was also a footballer and a defender. Often referred to as Lesmes II as he played in Valladolid with his sibling for four seasons, he represented mainly Real Madrid and was also an international.

Francisco, also known as Paco during his playing days, died on 11 August 2005 at the age of 81.
