= Paulo Pezzolano =

Uruguayan footballer and manager (born 1983)

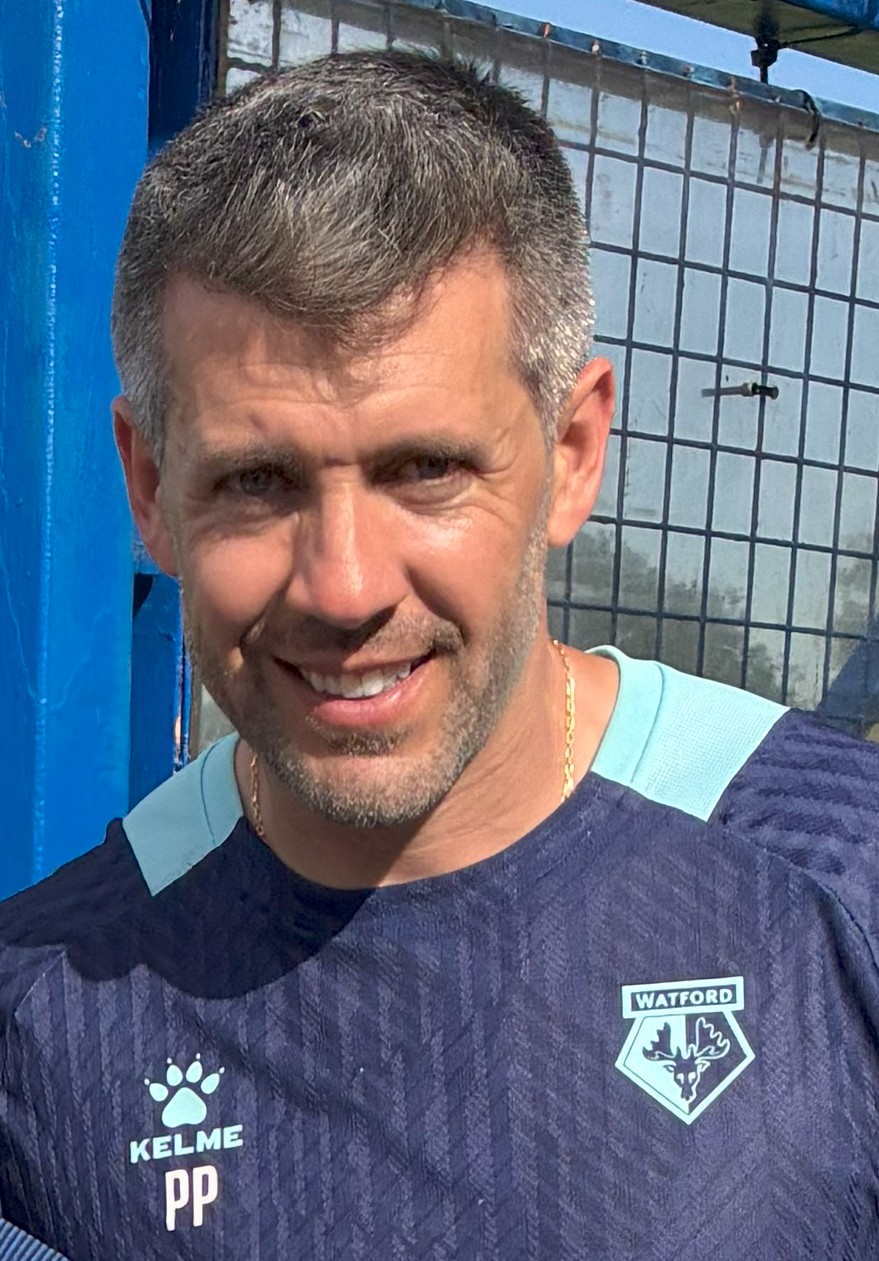
- Pezzolano as manager of Watford in 2025

Personal information
- Full name: Paulo César Pezzolano Suárez
- Date of birth: 25 April 1983 (age 43)
- Place of birth: Montevideo, Uruguay
- Height: 1.88 m (6 ft 2 in)
- Position: Attacking midfielder

Senior career*
| Years | Team | Apps | (Gls) |
| 2001–2006 | Rentistas | 49 | (16) |
| 2006 | Atlético Paranaense | 5 | (2) |
| 2006-2007 | Defensor Sporting | 31 | (5) |
| 2008 | Peñarol | 12 | (0) |
| 2008–2011 | Liverpool Montevideo | 39 | (20) |
| 2009–2010 | → Mallorca (loan) | 12 | (0) |
| 2011–2012 | Zhejiang FC | 24 | (6) |
| 2012 | Necaxa | 12 | (1) |
| 2012–2016 | Liverpool Montevideo | 74 | (22) |
| 2016 | Torque | 15 | (3) |

Managerial career
- 2017: Torque
- 2018–2019: Liverpool Montevideo
- 2019–2021: Pachuca
- 2022–2023: Cruzeiro
- 2023–2024: Valladolid
- 2025: Watford
- 2026: Internacional
- * Club domestic league appearances and goals

Paulo César Pezzolano Suárez (Latin American Spanish: [ˈpawlo pesoˈlano]; born 25 April 1983) is an Uruguayan football manager and former player who played as an attacking midfielder.

== Playing career ==
Pezzolano comes from the capital city of Montevideo and is a graduate of the local team Rentistas, were for the senior team he was involved in the age of 18. His team was relegated to the Second Division after a poor season in 2001. He spent the next two years, after which he returned with his team to the First División.

In 2006, he moved to the Brazilian club Atlético Paranaense; but, after six months, he returned to his native country, signing an agreement with Defensor Sporting. In the 2006–07 season, he took a decisive role with his team to achieve third place in the league and to get to the quarter-finals of the 2007 Copa Libertadores.

In July 2007, Pezzolano signed with Uruguayan giants Peñarol. Six months later, he joined Liverpool Montevideo, scoring a hat-trick in his debut against Central Español. In his first season (Clausura 2008) with the team, he was the top scorer of the tournament, scoring 12 goals in 14 games. A year later, in the Copa Sudamericana, they were knocked out in the first stage.

In August 2009, Pezzolano went on loan to Spanish team Mallorca. He made his La Liga debut on September 19, 2009, meeting with the 4–0 win against Tenerife. Overall, in the 2009–2010 season, he played 12 matches in Mallorca, but only one in the starting eleven, as the team led by Gregorio Manzano took fifth place in the league table.

Pezzolano was transferred to Chinese Super League side Hangzhou Greentown in January 2011. He made his Chinese Super League debut on 1 April 2011 against Nanchang Hengyuan, scoring one goal.

In early January 2012, he joined Liga de Ascenso side Necaxa.

In July 2012, he returned to his home city to play for the second time in his career with Liverpool Montevideo. In his first game upon his return, he scored a penalty against Universitario in the Copa Sudamericana.

In February 2016, he joined Torque on a free transfer. He spent a season with them, before announcing his retirement on 23 November 2016, aged 33.

== Coaching career ==
=== Torque ===
Immediately after retiring, Pezzolano became the manager of Torque for the upcoming season. He led the club to the 2017 Segunda División title before leaving the club on 25 November 2017.

=== Liverpool Montevideo ===
On 18 December 2017, Pezzolano was named manager of another club he represented as a player, Liverpool Montevideo. He departed the club on 25 November 2019, after accepting an offer from a foreign club.

=== Pachuca ===
Hours after leaving Liverpool, Pezzolano was named in charge of Liga MX side Pachuca, replacing Martín Palermo. He led Pachuca to the play-offs during the 2020–21 season, losing in the semifinals of the 2021 Torneo Guardianes.

On 8 November 2021, after a 15th-place finish in the 2021 Apertura tournament, Pezzolano left the club on a mutual agreement.

=== Cruzeiro ===
On 3 January 2022, Pezzolano was announced as new head coach of Brazilian Série B side Cruzeiro, becoming their first head coach after the team's sale to Ronaldo. He reached the finals of the 2022 Campeonato Mineiro.

Pezzolano led Cruzeiro to a promotion to the Série A, and became the champion of the category with the most numbers of anticipated rounds. On 19 March 2023, however, he left the club on a mutual agreement, after their elimination in the 2023 Mineiro.

=== Valladolid ===
On 4 April 2023, Pezzolano was appointed manager of Real Valladolid, also owned by Ronaldo, in the place of sacked Pacheta. Despite suffering relegation, he remained in charge of the club in the 2023–24 season, and achieved promotion back to the top tier.

On 30 November 2024, after a 5–0 defeat to Atlético Madrid, Valladolid announced that Pezzolano will not continue as manager.

=== Watford ===
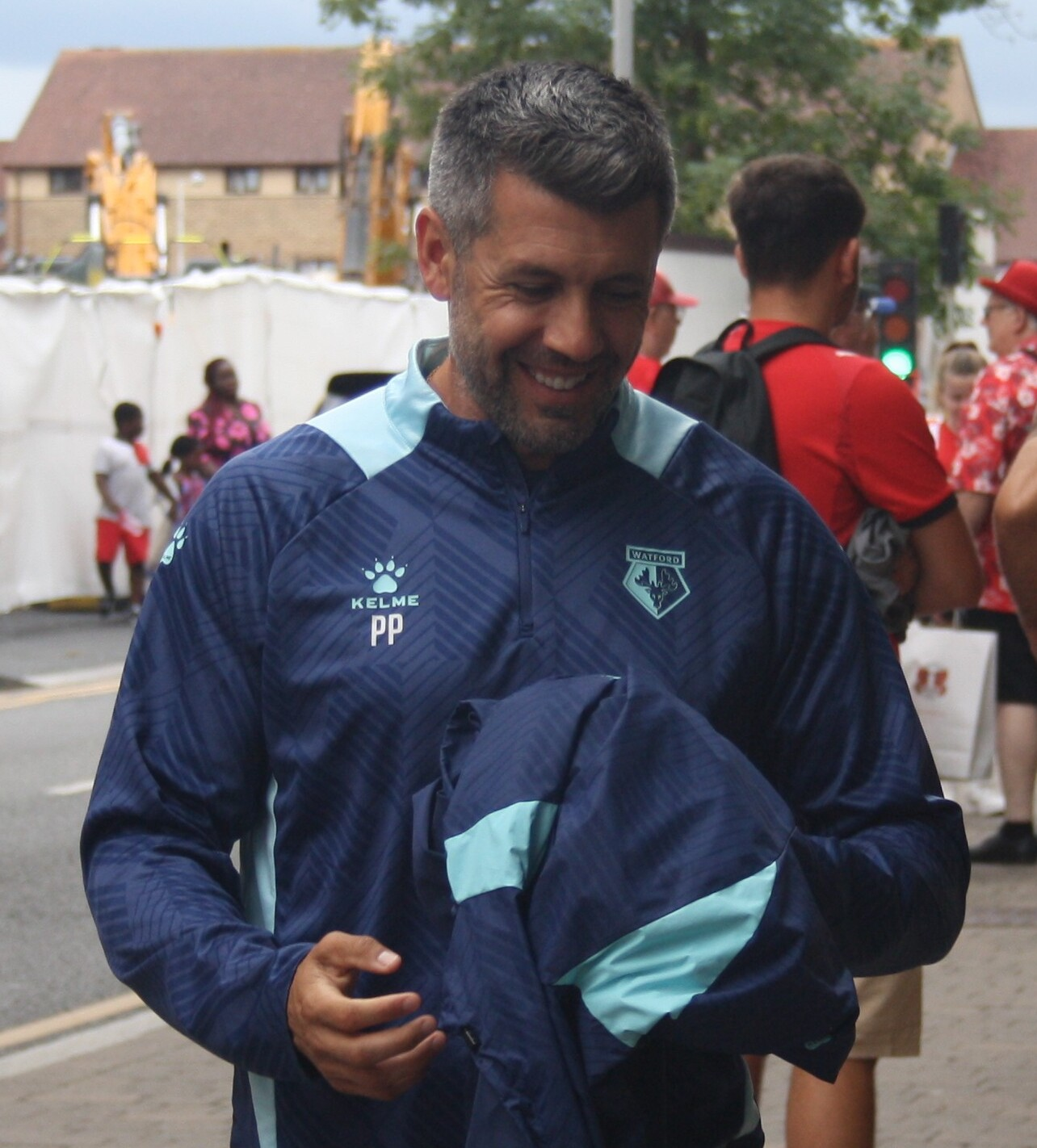
Pezzolano as manager of Watford in 2025

On 13 May 2025, Pezzolano was appointed head coach of EFL Championship club Watford. He was sacked on 8 October after the Hornets poor start to the season, with the owner's ambition to fight for promotion. He became the 12th Watford manager in 5 years to be sacked, and was replaced by former Watford and Leeds manager Javi Gracia.

=== Internacional ===
On 18 December 2025, Pezzolano returned to Brazil after being named head coach of Internacional on a one-year contract. The following 20 September, with the club in the relegation zone, he was dismissed.

== Managerial statistics ==
As of 21 September 2026

Managerial record by team and tenure
| Team | Nat | From | To | Record | | | | | | | | Ref |
| Team | Nat | From | To | G | W | D | L | GF | GA | GD | Win % | Ref |
|---|---|---|---|---|---|---|---|---|---|---|---|---|
| Torque | (Uruguay) | 28 November 2016 | 26 November 2017 | 28 | 16 | 8 | 4 | 48 | 23 | +25 | 57.14 | |
| Liverpool | (Uruguay) | 17 December 2017 | 25 November 2019 | 77 | 32 | 24 | 21 | 112 | 94 | +18 | 41.56 | |
| Pachuca | (Mexico) | 6 December 2019 | 11 November 2021 | 73 | 24 | 24 | 25 | 87 | 84 | +3 | 32.88 | |
| Cruzeiro | (Brazil) | 4 January 2022 | 19 March 2023 | 67 | 37 | 14 | 16 | 104 | 58 | +46 | 55.22 | |
| Valladolid | (Spain) | 4 April 2023 | 30 November 2024 | 71 | 28 | 15 | 28 | 84 | 92 | −8 | 39.44 | |
| Watford | (England) | 13 May 2025 | 8 October 2025 | 10 | 3 | 3 | 4 | 12 | 13 | −1 | 30.00 | |
| Internacional | (Brazil) | 18 December 2025 | 20 September 2026 | 43 | 16 | 12 | 15 | 61 | 51 | +10 | 37.21 | |
| Total | | | | 369 | 156 | 100 | 113 | 508 | 414 | +94 | 42.28 | — |

== Honours ==
=== Manager ===
Torque

- Uruguayan Segunda División: 2017

Cruzeiro

- Campeonato Brasileiro Série B: 2022

Internacional

- Recopa Gaúcha: 2026
