= István Plattkó =

Hungarian football manager (1883–1966)

Personal information
- Full name: István Plattkó Kopiletz
- Date of birth: 4 May 1883
- Place of birth: Budapest, Austria-Hungary
- Date of death: 16 November 1966 (aged 83)
- Place of death: Palma de Mallorca, Spain

Managerial career
- Years: Team
- 1925–1928: Terrassa
- 1928–1930: Valladolid
- 1930–1933: Arenas
- 1933–1936: Valladolid
- 1939–1940: Valladolid
- 1940–1941: Constància
- 1942–1943: Valladolid
- 1943–1945: Granada
- 1945: Constància
- 1947–1948: Constància
- 1949–1950: Atlético Baleares
- 1955–1956: Mallorca
- Binissalem

István Plattkó also known as Esteban Platko (4 May 1883 – 16 November 1966) was a Hungarian football player and manager who coached Real Valladolid, Granada, Atlético Baleares and Mallorca in Spain. His brothers were Ferenc Plattkó and Károly Plattkó.

Plattkó spent much of his coaching career in the Balearic Islands with Constància, Binissalem and Atlético Baleares before he died in Palma de Mallorca, Spain.
