= Alejandro Galdeano =

Spanish footballer (born 2007)

Personal information
- Full name: Alejandro Galdeano Carrión
- Date of birth: 4 November 2007 (age 18)
- Place of birth: Valladolid, Spain
- Height: 1.81 m (5 ft 11 in)
- Position: Centre-back

Team information
- Current team: Valladolid B
- Number: 33

Youth career
- Arces
- 2018–2026: Valladolid

Senior career*
Years	Team	Apps	(Gls)
2025–	Valladolid B	21	(0)
2026–	Valladolid	1	(0)

International career
2024	Spain U17	2	(0)
- * Club domestic league appearances and goals as of 17 May 2026

Alejandro Galdeano Carrión (born 4 November 2007), sometimes known as Galde, is a Spanish footballer who plays as a centre-back for Real Valladolid Promesas.

== Club career ==
Born in Valladolid, Castile and León, Galdeano joined Real Valladolid's youth sides in 2018, from CD Arces. He made his senior debut with the reserves on 4 May 2025, playing the last 16 minutes of a 1–1 Segunda Federación away draw against SD Compostela.

After establishing himself in the B-team, Galdeano made his debut with the main squad on 16 May 2026, coming on as a late substitute for Ramón Martínez in a 4–1 Segunda División loss to Racing de Santander.

== International career ==
On 5 December 2023, Galdeano was called up to the Spain national under-17 team for a period of trainings. He made his debut with the side the following 23 January, playing the entire second half in a 3–3 friendly against Italy.
