= Pepe Moré =

Spanish footballer and manager

Personal information
- Full name: José Moré Bonet
- Date of birth: 29 January 1953 (age 73)
- Place of birth: L'Ametlla del Vallès, Spain
- Height: 1.79 m (5 ft 10 1/2 in)
- Position: Midfielder

Youth career
- Barcelona

Senior career*
Years	Team	Apps	(Gls)
1971–1976	Barcelona B	172	(8)
1976–1988	Valladolid	374	(48)
Total		546	(56)

Managerial career
- 1988–2000: Valladolid B
- 1989–1990: Valladolid
- 1994: Valladolid
- 1994–1995: Valladolid
- 1996–1998: Valladolid B
- 2001–2003: Valladolid
- 2004–2005: Tenerife
- 2005–2007: Castellón
- * Club domestic league appearances and goals

José "Pepe" Moré Bonet (born 29 January 1953) is a Spanish former professional football midfielder and manager.

His career was closely associated to Real Valladolid, as both a player and coach. Over the course of eight seasons, he amassed La Liga totals of 232 games and 19 goals for the club.

== Playing career ==
Born in L'Ametlla del Vallès, Barcelona, Catalonia, Moré started his senior career with FC Barcelona's reserves. In the summer of 1976, after a couple of Segunda División seasons, he joined another team at that level, Real Valladolid.

Moré remained with the Castile and León side the following 12 years, appearing and starting in all 38 league games in his fourth season to help them promote to La Liga while scoring eight goals. He retired in June 1988 at the age of 35, having played 448 competitive matches for his main club.

== Coaching career ==
Moré started coaching immediately after retiring, with Real Valladolid Promesas. On several occasions, however, he would be appointed interim of the main squad, and would also be in charge for two full seasons, 2001–02 and 2002–03, always leading the team to top-flight safety; in addition, he acted as assistant to several managers during his tenure.

In the following years, Moré worked in division two with CD Tenerife and CD Castellón, being dismissed by the latter midway through his third season.

== Personal life ==
Moré's son, Xavier, was also a footballer and a midfielder. He too represented Valladolid, being coached by his father.

== Honours ==
=== Player ===
Barcelona B

- Tercera División: 1973–74

Valladolid

- Copa de la Liga: 1984
