= Gijón Sport Club =

Football club in Spain

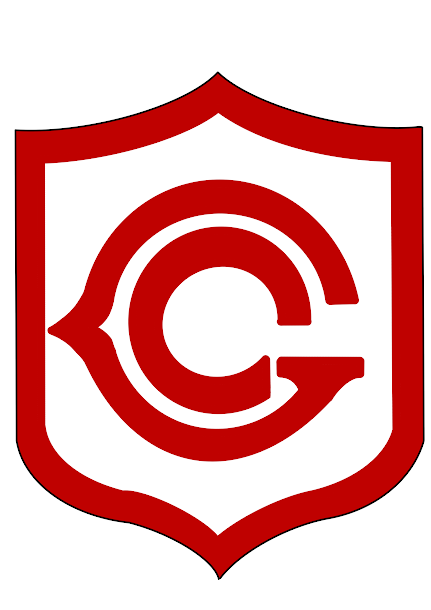
- Short name: Gijón SC
- Founded: 26 December 1902
- Dissolved: 10 January 1916
- Ground: Gijón
- Chairman: José Suárez Sánchez

The Gijón Sport Club was a football team based in Gijón that existed between 1902 and 1916. It was the first official football club in Gijón.

== History ==
=== Origins ===
Gijón was introduced to football by two distinct groups: sailors from foreign ships docking at the port of El Musel, who were the first to practice football in the city on the San Lorenzo beach, and Gijón students returning from schools abroad, who brought their newly founded passion for football to Gijón during the summer holidays, such as José Moré, Antonio de la Riva, the Alvargonzález brothers (Romualdo and José Luis), Demetrio Castrillón, and Luis Adaro Porcel. The latter, who had completed his studies as a mechanical engineer in Switzerland and Germany at the turn of the century, was the one who obtained the goals and equipment necessary for those first games in Gijón.

In July 1901, his father, Luis Adaro Magro, a very important businessman in the mining and metallurgical history of Asturias, established two coal loaders in El Musel, so Adaro Porcel took advantage of that to organize football matches between his fellow students and the crews of the foreign ships. In the following year, in 1902, Adaro Porcel founded Gijón Sport, which thus became the first football club in Gijón, official or otherwise. However, it also a multi-sport and cultural club that provided shelter for other disciplines, such as pedestrianism, cycling, chess, and theatre. It was only in December 1903 that Gijón Sport was officially registered, with José Suárez Sánchez as its first president. The club's main driving force was Adaro Porcel, who had the financial and human support of José Suárez Sánchez, Paco Marrodán, and Pedro Sánchez.

=== Golden age ===
The Gijón Sport began organizing daily football matches at the Prau Redondo (Redondo meadow), next to the Obispo road, and on 17 August 1903, Gijón played its first official match at the Redondo meadow, beating a certain Oviedo Foot-Ball Club. From 1904 onwards, however, Prau Redondo began to be divided into plots and sold in lots, resulting in the blocks and streets that still stand today. The work of the Gijón Sport, which became more serious every day, led them to play matches against Galician and Basque clubs on the esplanade of El Bibio, including a match against Avilés SC on 29 May 1904, which was the first paid match in Asturias, with a ticket price of 25 cents, but that did not discourage the curious local youth, who already in 1904, founded the Juventud Sportiva Gijonesa, and naturally, these two clubs began facing each other in city derbies, thus developing a rivalry that helped turn football into a mass phenomenon in Bilbao since their duels aroused great expectation.

Football began taking root in the city, and soon gained followers among the young students of Colegio de la Inmaculada, a Jesuit school on the Cuesta de Ceares, and likewise, the school's courtyard became a frequent setting for encounters between schoolchildren and local teams, including Gijón SC. Around 1910, a piece of land next to a flour mill owned by the Alvargonzález brothers, today a national tourist inn, began to be used regularly as a playing field by Sport Gijón, and this playing field eventually became known as El Molinón. Initially, the only existing elements of this field were the goals, but in the most important matches, the club provided chairs to accommodate the growing number of fans.

=== Decline and collapse ===
In 1911, it merged with Juventud Sportiva Gijonesa, but they separated again shortly after. The club was dissolved in 1916.

== Legacy ==
The Gijón Sport Club introduced the sport of football in the region, which eventually became a mass phenomenon among the youth of Gijón, with both its rules of play and its clothing serving as a reference for other teams of the time, including Sporting Gijonés, which was founded by Anselmo López and his young friends in 1905, and which would later become Sporting Gijón.
