= Anselmo López (footballer) =

Spanish footballer and sports leader

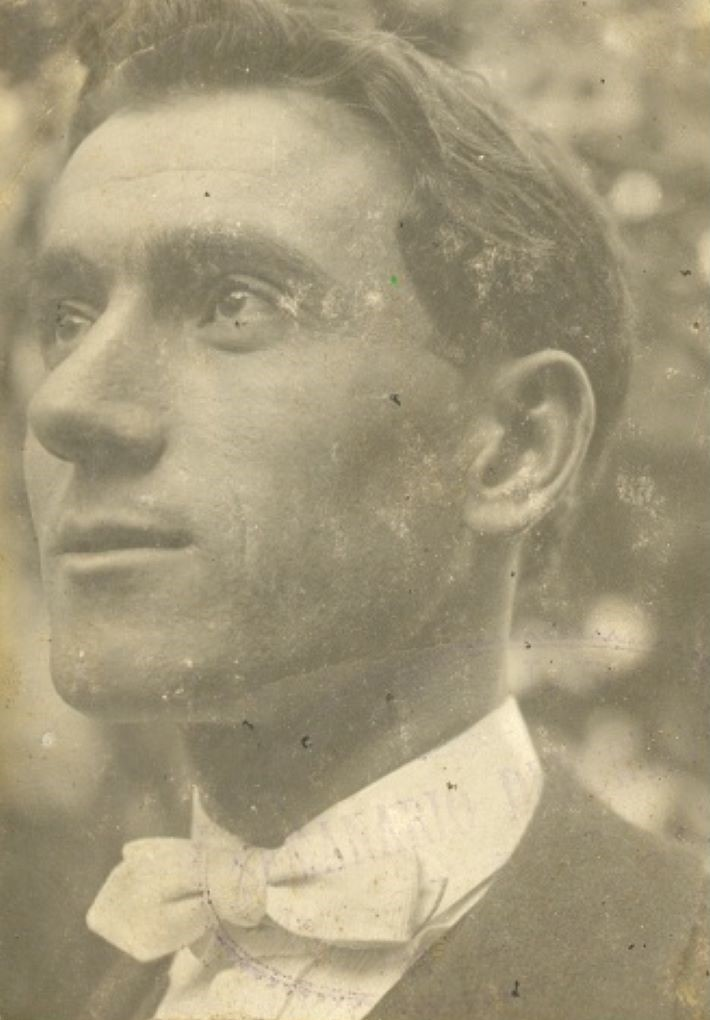

Personal information
- Full name: Anselmo Ramón López Sánchez
- Date of birth: 25 January 1891
- Place of birth: Gijón, Asturias, Spain
- Date of death: 5 November 1919 (aged 28)
- Place of death: Gijón, Asturias, Spain
- Position: Goalkeeper

Senior career*
Years	Team	Apps	(Gls)
1905–1915	Sporting de Gijón		

Managerial career
- 1905–1913: Sporting de Gijón
1st president of Sporting de Gijón
In office 1905–1915
Succeeded by	Fernando Fernández Quirós; Suárez
- * Club domestic league appearances and goals

Anselmo Ramón López De Sánchez (25 January 1891 – 5 November 1919) was a Spanish footballer who played as a goalkeeper for Sporting de Gijón. He is widely regarded as one of the most important figures in the amateur beginnings of Sporting de Gijón, having been the fundamental head behind the club's foundation in 1905, and then serving as its first president for over a decade, from 1905 until 1915.

== Early life ==
Anselmo López De Sánchez was born in Gijón on 25 January 1891, as the son of Crescencia Sánchez Cambert, a native of Villaviciosa, and Anselmo López del Valle, a native of Cenero who died before his birth. On several occasions, López signed with the initials ALD, having compressed his second surname from "De Sánchez" to "Desanch".

== Sporting career ==
=== Founding Sporting de Gijón ===
Like so many other youngsters from Gijón, López began playing football with a group of friends at the San Lorenzo beach, which had been the home to organized football in Gijón since the early 20th century, and which was located near his family home on the street Marqués de San Esteban. He soon began organizing the gatherings of this group of pioneers which became known as Sporting Gijonés.

In the summer of 1905, after a few years of playing this sport in informal meetings, the 14-year-old López, inspired by Luis Adaro Porcel's Gijón Sport, decided to take a step further and formalize the situation, so they merged with two other clubs, La Recreativa and another one run by the Bernaldo de Quirós brothers, and this resulted in the official creation of the club on 1 July 1905. (Note: There is controversy over the foundation date of Sporting, with the club's own board of directors defending that it was founded in 1900 with Anselmo López at the head, in a statement in which it claimed to be the oldest team in the city.) Three other groups of brothers were present at the birth of the entity: The Pinedas (Loyola and Conrado), who had been born in Manila, Philippines, the Barrosos (José and Julio), and the Muñiz (Manuel, Oscar, and Ramon).

=== President of Sporting de Gijón ===
The club's board was subsequently elected, with López being appointed as its first president, while Ignacio Lavilla was named secretary, being thus the one in charge of creating the Sporting's first statutes, which were written "in English handwriting in a notebook with rubber covers". The board also included the likes of Jacobo Argüelles, the Bernaldo de Quirós brothers (Julio and Alfredo), who are relatives of María Bernaldo de Quirós, and Florentino García Sordo. The latter described the early years of Sporting as a "union of some kids led by a constant and tenacious man [López]", who was able to "find ways to exercise the vitality and dynamism of the children", while the secretary Lavilla later described him as a visionary and an exceptional organizer whose moral and ethical principles were reminiscent of Pierre de Coubertin.

López went on to establish a "completely absolutist Dictatorship of which he was president, secretary, accountant, member, collector, and ballboy". Additionally, he was also a player, becoming Sporting's first-ever goalkeeper and thus appearing in the team's first known line-up, a match against Sport Ovetense in August 1907, where he played alongside the three Muñiz brothers. He was a true all-purpose man at the club, going on to also become its first coach (although that term had not yet been coined in Spain), serving simultaneously as coach, player, and president until 1913, although he continued working as the latter two until 1915. In its beginnings, Sporting competed against Adaro's Gijón Sport, and also against the students of the Colegio de la Inmaculada, a Jesuit school on the Cuesta de Ceares who had been playing football in its courtyard since 1890.

His entrepreneurial drive was evident from an early age, since at the age of 17, in 1908, López traveled to Santander, where he successfully arranged a match between Sporting and a club from Santander, and three years later, in 1911, he organized the Asturias Children's Football Championship in Gijón, a remarkable event for that era, to which he invited José Canalejas y Méndez, who was then the Prime Minister of Spain and who had been appointed honorary president of Sporting, but he was unavailable and ended up being represented by the Mayor of Gijón. In August 1912, Sporting was granted the title of Real ("Royal") by King Alfonso XIII thanks to the intervention of an associate of López whose son was a cavalry captain of the Royal House. He also designed the Sporting's first emblem, which was later modified to include a more traditional Bourbon crown.

López held Sporting's presidency for over a decade, from 1905 until 1915, when he was replaced by Fernando Fernández Quirós Suárez. Under his leadership, the club played on several fields, starting with the sandbanks of the San Lorenzo beach until 1910, when it moved to La Matona, where they stayed for only one year, because in 1911, Sporting moved to Mr. Piñole's field, where they played until the El Molinón was rented in 1915. In that same year, his fellow founder Julio Barroso created the club's first sports section outside of football: the swimming section. He remained close to the club as a federative delegate until 1918.

=== Outside Sporting de Gijón ===
In 1913, López took the initiative to establish the first Asturian Football Federation, which only included the teams from Gijón, Avilés, and Sama, thus having a short life that ended with its controversial merger with the Cantabrian Federation in 1915, being appointed as a secretary of the latter entity in 1917.

As a supporter of the amateur Olympic spirit, López strongly advocated against the inevitable advent of professionalism, wanting to put a stop to it and repeatedly stating this at the federation meetings.

== Journalist career ==
López was also noted for his prominent role in promoting football in the city, which led him to work as a journalist for several magazines, newspapers, and sports publications, including Júpiter in Barcelona and Hércules in Bilbao, as well as Madrid-based magazines, such as España Sportiva and Madrid Sport, being the Asturias correspondent for some of them.

== Other interests ==
Outside football, López had a deep love for music, especially lyrical and Asturian songs, which led him to co-found the Club Arte y Sport in Gijón. He was also a member of various cultural gatherings and a theatre group, with which he even went on tour through Castile.

== Death ==
In the summer of 1919, López made a trip to Madrid for a meeting between football federations, being accompanied by Manolo Conde, who was representing the Cantabrian Federation, but during the return trip, he began suffering from a very high fever and had to endure 16 consecutive days in bed, after which he improved slightly. He ended up relapsing after undergoing a pending operation on his arm at the newly established Sanatorio Covadonga, and never again left his home until he died on 5 November 1919, at the young age of 28, due to intestinal tuberculosis.

His funeral was attended by hundreds of people, including representatives of many Asturian clubs, and he was buried at the El Suco cemetery, in the Gijón neighborhood of Ceares. In the following month, on 21 December, teams from Gijón and Oviedo played a tribute match in his honor, which was held at the El Molinón.

== Legacy ==
In the build-up to the celebration of the club's 50th anniversary, the then Sporting president Eustaquio Campomanes began negotiations with various former Sportinguistas from the first era to legally establish the club's foundation date, but the difference of opinions and the conflicting testimonies complicated this task, with the proceedings lasting 21 months, until November 1956, when the board finally agreed that López had been the first president. (Note: Five years earlier, on 20 December 1951, Conrado Pineda recounted the club's origins in a letter published in the sports section of the newspaper Voluntad, stating that he had been the first president from 1905 until 1907, when he was replaced by López, but he was quickly answered in the press by the also founders Ángel Pardo and Ignacio Lavilla, who pointed out López as president.)

On 25 January 2016, the 125th anniversary of his birth, Sporting held an event around his grave, which brought together the current president Antonio Veiga, as well as club legend Quini. After spending many years working on this initiative, the Asociación Anselmo López finally managed to install a bust of Anselmo López in the access tunnel to the changing rooms of the El Molinón, which was unveiled on 4 April 2017.
