= Richi (footballer) =

Spanish footballer

Personal information
- Full name: Ricardo Pérez de Zabalza Goytre
- Date of birth: 14 April 1977 (age 49)
- Place of birth: Madrid, Spain
- Height: 1.87 m (6 ft 2 in)
- Position: Attacking midfielder

Senior career*
Years	Team	Apps	(Gls)
2000–2001	Rayo Majadahonda	20	(16)
2001–2002	Atlético Madrid B	49	(17)
2002–2008	Murcia	215	(27)
2008–2010	Tenerife	58	(7)
2010–2012	Murcia	62	(3)
Total		404	(70)
- * Club domestic league appearances and goals

Ricardo Pérez de Zabalza Goytre (born 14 April 1977), commonly known as Richi, is a Spanish former professional footballer who played mainly as an attacking midfielder.

A late bloomer, he only began playing football well into his 20s, making his La Liga debut at 26. He spent most of his 12-year career with Real Murcia (two spells), making 308 appearances and scoring 36 goals across both major levels of Spanish football.

== Club career ==
After starting playing organised football aged already 23 with amateurs CF Rayo Majadahonda in his hometown of Madrid, Richi spent two further seasons with Atlético Madrid's reserves, having begun his career as a striker. For the 2002–03 campaign he joined Real Murcia CF, achieving promotion and making his La Liga debut in his second year, his first appearance in the competition being in a 1–1 away draw against RC Celta de Vigo on 31 August 2003; first choice from the beginning, he scored twice in 35 games as the club returned to the top flight again in 2007.

Richi signed with Segunda División's CD Tenerife in August 2008. He netted six goals in 36 matches, as the Canary Islands side returned to the top flight after seven years.

Richi was not as important in the following season, playing nearly 1,600 less minutes and only scoring once, when he opened a 4–1 home win over RCD Espanyol on 14 March 2010. In the summer, with Tenerife ultimately relegated, the 33-year-old returned to Murcia, also relegated but in the second tier.

== Personal life ==
Richi majored in energy engineering at the Technical University of Madrid.

== Honours ==
Murcia

- Segunda División: 2002–03
- Segunda División B: 2010–11
