= Real Valladolid Promesas =

Spanish football club

Valladolid Promesas
- Full name: Real Valladolid; Club de Fútbol Promesas, S.A.D.
- Nickname: Pucela
- Founded: 1942; 84 years ago
- Ground: Ciudad Deportiva del Real Valladolid, Valladolid, Castile and León, Spain
- Capacity: 1,500
- Owner: Grupo Ignite
- Head coach: Javi Baraja
- League: Segunda Federación – Group 5
- 2025–26: Segunda Federación – Group 1, 13th of 18
Home colours	Away colours

Real Valladolid Club de Fútbol Promesas is the reserve team of Real Valladolid, a Spanish football club based in Valladolid, in the autonomous community of Castile and León. Founded in 1942, currently plays in Segunda Federación – Group 5, holding home games at the Ciudad Deportiva del Real Valladolid, which seats 1,500 spectators.

== History ==
=== Team names ===
- Recreativo Europa Delicias - (1942–73)
- Real Valladolid Promesas - (1973–90)
- Real Valladolid B - (1990–2019)
- Real Valladolid Promesas - (2019–)

== Season to season ==
- As a farm team

Season	Tier	Division	Place	Copa del Rey
1946–47	4	1ª Reg.	3rd	
1947–48	4	1ª Reg.	1st	
1948–49	4	1ª Reg.		
1949–50	4	1ª Reg.	4th	
1950–51	4	1ª Reg.	5th	
1951–52	4	1ª Reg.	1st	
1952–53	3	3ª	13th	
1953–54	3	3ª	3rd	
1954–55	3	3ª	1st	
1955–56	3	3ª	5th	
1956–57	3	3ª	5th	
1957–58	3	3ª	14th	
1958–59	3	3ª	10th	
1959–60	3	3ª	13th	
1960–61	3	3ª	4th	
1961–62	3	3ª	2nd	
1962–63	3	3ª	5th	
1963–64	3	3ª	4th	
1964–65	3	3ª	13th	
1965–66	3	3ª	5th	

Season	Tier	Division	Place	Copa del Rey
1966–67	3	3ª	5th	
1967–68	3	3ª	4th	
1968–69	3	3ª	10th	
1969–70	3	3ª	9th	
1970–71	4	Reg. Pref.	5th	
1971–72	4	Reg. Pref.	3rd	
1972–73	4	Reg. Pref.	7th	
1973–74	4	Reg. Pref.	2nd	
1974–75	4	Reg. Pref.	3rd	
1975–76	4	Reg. Pref.	2nd	
1976–77	4	Reg. Pref.	4th	
1977–78	4	3ª	13th	
1978–79	4	3ª	16th	
1979–80	4	3ª	3rd	
1980–81	4	3ª	1st	
1981–82	4	3ª	1st	
1982–83	4	3ª	1st	
1983–84	4	3ª	6th	
1984–85	4	3ª	4th	
1985–86	4	3ª	3rd	

Season	Tier	Division	Place	Copa del Rey
1986–87	4	3ª	8th	
1987–88	4	3ª	2nd	
1988–89	4	3ª	4th	
1989–90	4	3ª	2nd	
1990–91	4	3ª	1st	

- As a reserve team

Season	Tier	Division	Place
1991–92	3	2ª B	8th
1992–93	3	2ª B	11th
1993–94	3	2ª B	16th
1994–95	3	2ª B	15th
1995–96	3	2ª B	6th
1996–97	3	2ª B	5th
1997–98	3	2ª B	12th
1998–99	3	2ª B	9th
1999–2000	3	2ª B	18th
2000–01	4	3ª	2nd
2001–02	4	3ª	3rd
2002–03	4	3ª	6th
2003–04	4	3ª	6th
2004–05	4	3ª	4th
2005–06	3	2ª B	10th
2006–07	3	2ª B	16th
2007–08	3	2ª B	14th
2008–09	3	2ª B	19th
2009–10	4	3ª	2nd
2010–11	4	3ª	5th

Season	Tier	Division	Place
2011–12	4	3ª	1st
2012–13	4	3ª	5th
2013–14	4	3ª	1st
2014–15	3	2ª B	9th
2015–16	3	2ª B	13th
2016–17	3	2ª B	6th
2017–18	3	2ª B	15th
2018–19	3	2ª B	11th
2019–20	3	2ª B	4th
2020–21	3	2ª B	3rd / 5th
2021–22	3	1ª RFEF	18th
2022–23	4	2ª Fed.	3rd
2023–24	4	2ª Fed.	8th
2024–25	4	2ª Fed.	12th
2025–26	4	2ª Fed.	13th
2026–27	4	2ª Fed.	

|}

- 1 season in Primera División RFEF
- 20 seasons in Segunda División B
- 5 seasons in Segunda Federación
- 42 seasons in Tercera División

== Honours ==
- Tercera División
  - Champions (7): 1954–55, 1980–81, 1981–82, 1982–83, 1990–91, 2011–12, 2013–14

== Current squad ==
As of 2 September 2026

Note: Flags indicate national team as defined under FIFA eligibility rules; some limited exceptions apply. Players may hold more than one non-FIFA nationality.

No.	Pos.	Nation	Player
1	GK	ESP	Hugo Wauthier
2	DF	ESP	Miguel Flores
3	DF	BRA	Miguel Platero
5	DF	ESP	Diego Arco
6	DF	ESP	Alejandro Galdeano
7	MF	ESP	César Porras
8	MF	ESP	Juan Carlos Murcia
9	FW	ESP	Tomy Fernández
10	MF	ESP	Rulo González
11	MF	ESP	Hugo Calvo
12	DF	ESP	Isma Díaz
13	GK	ESP	Dani Tejero
14	MF	ESP	Iker González

No.	Pos.	Nation	Player
16	DF	CIV	Moha Sylla
17	MF	NGA	Sani Buhari
19	DF	LUX	Helmer Tavares
20	FW	NGA	Brain Chinedu
21	DF	ESP	Gonzalo Cebrián
22	MF	ESP	Marcos Parriego
24	MF	CIV	Emmanuel Ligué
26	MF	CMR	Nemi Junior
28	MF	URU	Adrián Núñez
29	DF	ESP	Nouhoun Sylla
30	MF	ESP	Adri Rodríguez
34	MF	ESP	Adam Mulele

=== From Youth Academy ===
Note: Flags indicate national team as defined under FIFA eligibility rules; some limited exceptions apply. Players may hold more than one non-FIFA nationality.

No.	Pos.	Nation	Player

=== Current technical staff ===
Position	Staff
Head coach	(Spain) Manu Olivas
Assistant coach	(Spain) Iván Briones
Technical assistant	(Spain) Javi Torres
Fitness coach	(Spain) Asier Arranz
Goalkeeping coach	(Spain) Juan Carlos
Analyst	(Spain) Alejandro Ortega Pons
Executive-Delegate	(Spain) Pedro Coria
Delegate	(Spain) José Ramón Yarza
Match delegate	(Spain) Paco Torices
Team manager	(Spain) Adrián Santos
Kit man	(Spain) Pali
Doctor	(Spain) Félix Valentín
Medical assistant	(Spain) Mar López
Rehab fitness coach	(Spain) José Luis Quintero Illera
Nutritionist	(Spain) Andrea de la Cruz Garijo
Physiotherapist	(Spain) Zipi (Spain) Noel Soto Hernández

Last updated: 20 February 2025
Source: Real Valladolid

== Notable former players ==
- (Equatorial Guinea) Aitor Embela
- (Equatorial Guinea) Benjamín Zarandona
- (The Gambia) Bacari
- (Spain) Anuar
- (Spain) Sergio Asenjo
- (Spain) Yuri Berchiche
- (Spain) Rubén Baraja
- (Spain) Carlos Calvo
- (Spain) Fran No
- (Spain) Jacobo
- (Spain) Xavi Moré
- (Spain) Onésimo
- (Spain) Óscar
- (Spain) Quique González
- (Spain) César Sánchez
- (Spain) Jesús Turiel
