= Conrado Pineda =

Spanish consular and football pioneer

Personal information
- Full name: Conrado Pineda Barbachano
- Place of birth: Manila, Philippines
- Date of death: 20 October 1953
- Place of death: Gijón, Spain
- Position: Defender

Senior career*
| Years | Team | Apps | (Gls) |
| 1905–1907 | Sporting de Gijón | | |
- * Club domestic league appearances and goals

Conrado Pineda Barbachano (died 20 October 1953) was a Spanish consular and footballer who played as a defender for Sporting de Gijón. He was an important figure in the amateur beginnings of Sporting de Gijón, being one of its founders in 1905, and then serving the club as a center-back until at least 1907.

== Early life and family ==
Conrado Pineda was born in the Philippines town of Manila, as the son of José Pineda Peláez, a judge from Infiesto who had worked in various courts in Havana, Barcelona, and Oviedo, before being assigned to Manila, and Marina Barbachano Álvarez, a Mexican-born Indian, whose family owned important businesses in Yucatán.

When his father was assigned to Gijón, the Pineda Barbachano couple moved and settled there, where their comfortable financial situation allowed them to raise nine children, six of whom went on to form ties with football, such as Conrado and Ignacio de Loyola, who played for Sporting de Gijón; Miguel, who played for Sport Ovetense and Gonzaga; and Marino, the youngest, who played for the Begoña Club youth team, while Francisco, the eldest, served as vice president of the CD Covadonga in Mexico, as well as a director of other locals teams linked to the Spanish emigration. Furthermore, one of his sisters, Lourdes, was the wife of Ramón Truán, who played for Sporting between 1908 and 1911, while married the architect Emilio Fernández-Peña, an known avid fan of Real Madrid.

== Sporting career ==
On 1 July 1905, Conrado and Loyola were among the four groups of brothers who founded the Sporting de Gijón, the other three being the Barrosos (José and Julio), the Muñiz (Manuel, Oscar, and Ramon), and the Bernaldo de Quirós (Alfredo and Julio). The two Pineda brothers appear in the team's first known line-up, a match against Sport Ovetense on 18 August 1907, where they played alongside the three Muñiz brothers. In addition to being Sporting's first-choice center-back, Pineda was also an excellent cyclist and wrestler, facing the Japanese champion Sada Raku in a series of exhibition bouts held in Gijón in September 1910.

On 20 December 1951, Pineda recounted the club's origins in a letter published in the sports section of the newspaper Voluntad, pointing out that it was established in the summer of 1905, and was thus nearing its 50th anniversary in 1955. He also stated that he had been the first president from 1905 until 1907, when he was replaced by Anselmo López, but he was quickly answered in the press by fellow founders Ángel Pardo and Ignacio Lavilla, who pointed out López as president. Despite this, most of the surviving founders accepted 1905 as the founding date, with only Ramón Muñiz expressing doubt as he more inclined to 1906 or 1907.

== Commercial career ==
Outside of sport, Conrado carried out commercial representation, working as a purse carrier for the Compañía Transatlántica Española (CTE), and as an agent for the Italian shipping companies Lloyd Genovese SA and Firenze SA, both of which had several offices in Spain, with the ones in Asturias being located in Pineda's own home at number 1 Langreo Street in Gijón, where he also regularly taught Italian. During his time at CTE, he was a purse carrier in the mail steamer Cristóbal Colón.

== Later life ==
His connection with the Italian shipping companies played a key role in his appointment as the Italian consul in Asturias, a position that he held for twenty years, from 1930 until his death on 20 October 1953.
