= José Moré =

American photojournalist

José Moré is an American photojournalist, a longtime staff photographer for the Chicago Tribune, covering news, features and sports assignments in Chicago and around the world. After leaving the Tribune in 2008, Moré was picture editor for the internet startup Chicago News Cooperative. that also appeared in the Chicago pages of the New York Times.

Moré excels in news, documentary and non-profits photography and is available for freelance assignments in Chicago or for national and international travel.

Moré was a staff photographer for United Press International and the Palm Beach Post before joining the Chicago Tribune as a staff photographer. He spent 28 years at the Tribune, where he covered international events, including the Wars in Afghanistan and Pakistan, Congo Civil War, conflicts in Central America and the Middle East, and earthquakes in Guatemala, Mexico, and Armenia), presidential campaigns, and several papal visits of Pope John Paul II. around the world.

Moré was an integral part of the Tribune staff that produced "Gateway to Gridlock", a series on the American air traffic control system for which the Tribune won the 2001 Pulitzer Prize for Explanatory Journalism. Moré and his colleague Cam Simpson also won the 2005 George Polk Award for International Reporting "for exposing a human trafficking network supplying labor to rebuild Iraq". Moré also won four Peter Lisagor Awards for Exemplary Journalism of the Chicago Headline Club.
