= Real Valladolid =

Spanish professional football club

- Full name: Real Valladolid Club de Fútbol, S.A.D.
- Nicknames: Pucela / Pucelanos (Pucelle); Blanquivioletas / Albivioletas (White and Violets)
- Founded: 20 June 1928; 98 years ago
- Stadium: José Zorrilla Stadium
- Capacity: 27,846
- Owner(s): Grupo Ignite (54%); Ben Oldman Partners (33%)
- President: Gabriel Solares
- Head coach: Fran Escribá
- League: Segunda División
- 2025–26: Segunda División, 17th of 22
- Website: realvalladolid.es
Home colours	Away colours	Third colours

Real Valladolid Club de Fútbol, S.A.D., or simply Real Valladolid (pronounced [reˈal βaʎaðoˈlið]), is a Spanish professional football club based in Valladolid, Castile and León. The club competes in the Segunda División, the second tier of Spanish professional football.

The club colours are violet and white, used on the kit in stripes from its foundation on 20 June 1928. The team plays its home games at the Estadio José Zorrilla, which seats 27,846 spectators. Valladolid's honours include a single trophy of great relevance, the defunct Copa de la Liga 1983–84. It has been runner-up in the Copa del Rey on two occasions (1949–50 and 1988–89), and has participated in two editions of the UEFA Cup (1984–85 and 1997–98) and also one edition of the UEFA Cup Winners' Cup (1989–90). The team subsidiary, the Real Valladolid Promesas, currently play in the Segunda Federación.

Since its La Liga debut in the 1948–49 season (in which it became the first club from the region to play in La Liga – five others have since done so), Valladolid is the most successful football club in Castile and León by honours and history, with a total of 47 seasons in the First Division, 36 in the Second and 10 in the Third. Historically, Valladolid is the 13th-best team in Spain by overall league points. Two of its players have won the Pichichi Trophy: Manuel Badenes and Jorge da Silva; and ten were internationals with the Spain national football team. In the 21st century, the club's domestic performance follows a yo-yo club pattern, with multiple promotions to (and relegations from) the first division.

On 3 September 2018, it was announced that Brazilian former international footballer Ronaldo Nazario had become the majority shareholder after purchasing a 51% controlling stake in the club.

In 2025, Nazario sold the controlling stake to Grupo Ignite.

== History ==
=== 20th-century history (1928–2001) ===
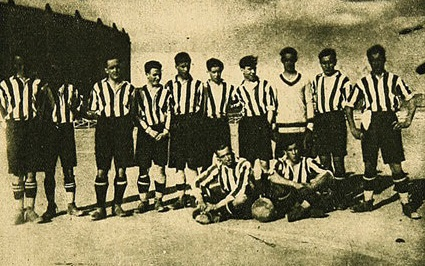
Real Unión Deportiva de Valladolid in 1927

Real Valladolid was founded from the merger of Real Unión Deportiva de Valladolid and Club Deportivo Español Valladolid, the club played its first game on 22 September 1928. It was a 2–1 win over Alavés. Valladolid first reached the top level in the 1947–48 season, as champions of the Segunda División. The club became the first Castile and León club to play in the Spanish top flight. The following year, the team pushed on from this success and reached the finals of the Copa del Rey in Chamartín Stadium against Athletic Bilbao, losing 4–1.

The next ten years were spent in the first division, and relegation was short-lived as Valladolid gained promotion again in 1958–59 with a 5–0 win over Terrassa under manager José Luis Saso, a legendary figure in club history. He had originally been a goalkeeper for the club and went on to perform many roles, including serving as president of the club.

Valladolid swung between the first and second divisions in subsequent years, falling as low as to the third division in 1970–71. Next year the club was promoted to second division and in 1980 promoted to first division, where Valladolid played until 1992 when the club was relegated to the second division again. Promoted in 1992–93, the club was again sent down after the 2003–04 season. In 1984, Valladolid also won the Copa de la Liga (a competition only played in the early 1980s) over Atlético Madrid.

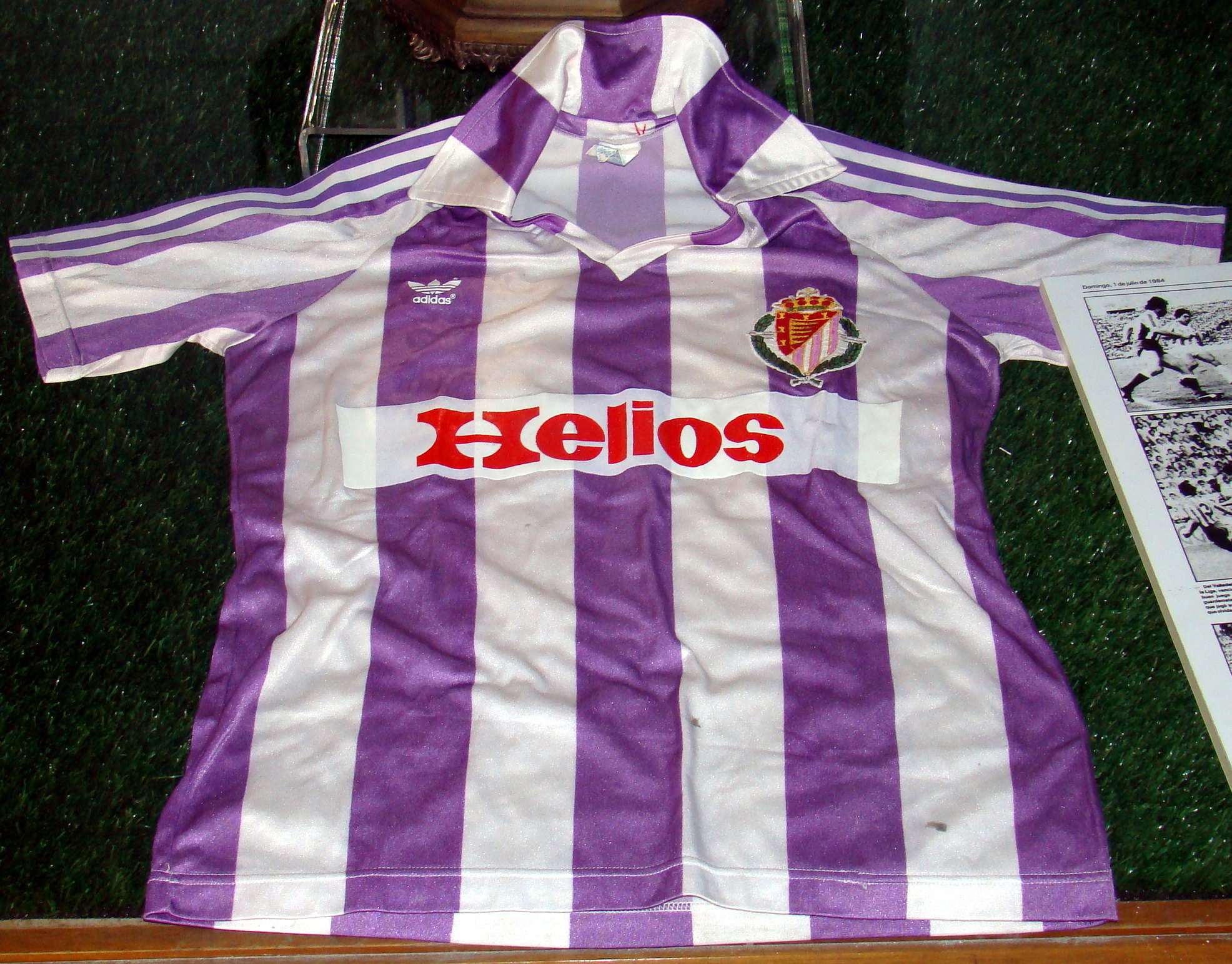
Real Valladolid uniform in the season 1983–84, when the club won its only official trophy: the 1984 Copa de la Liga

On 14 April 1996, Valladolid played its 1,000th game in La Liga.

The side's highest position during this 11-year stint was seventh in 1996–97, being coached in the previous seasons by former Real Madrid Castilla coach Rafael Benítez, as various players from that team would also later appear for Valladolid.

=== Carlos Suárez era (2001–2018) ===
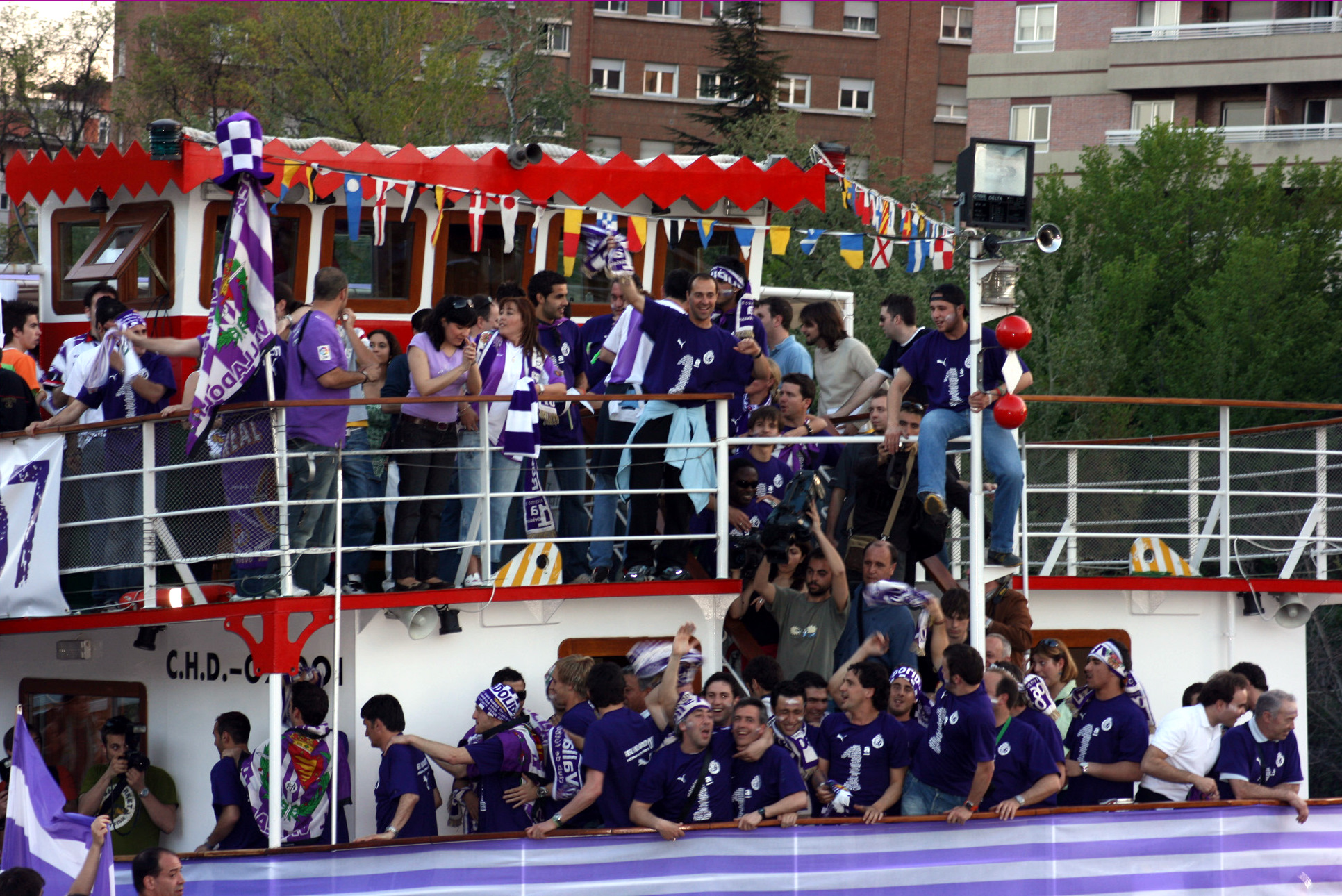
Real Valladolid players cruising the Río Pisuerga while celebrating the club's promotion to La Liga in April 2007

In the 2006–07 season, after signing Basque José Luis Mendilibar as head coach, Valladolid had one of its best years in its history while playing in the second level. The club took the league lead in the 15th matchday and went on to finish with a competition all-time high 88 points, winning the championship by a total margin of eight points, and holding an advantage of 26 points over the non-promotion zone (fourth and below), both being all-time records in the league. Valladolid also achieved the honour of going unbeaten in 29-straight matches, from 10 October 2006 to 6 May 2007, being mathematically promoted after a 2–0 away win against Tenerife on 22 April 2007 (the 34th matchday of the season), the earliest any club has achieved promotion in Spanish history.

Also remarkable was the side's role in the season's Copa del Rey, reaching the quarter-finals after defeating two top division teams, Gimnàstic de Tarragona (4–1 aggregate) and the 2005–06 UEFA Champions League contender Villarreal (3–1), while playing the entire competition with reserve players.

Two relatively successful seasons in the top division followed, finishing in 15th place while avoiding relegation after a 1–1 draw on the last matchday of both seasons (against Recreativo de Huelva in 2007–08 and Real Betis in the following campaign).

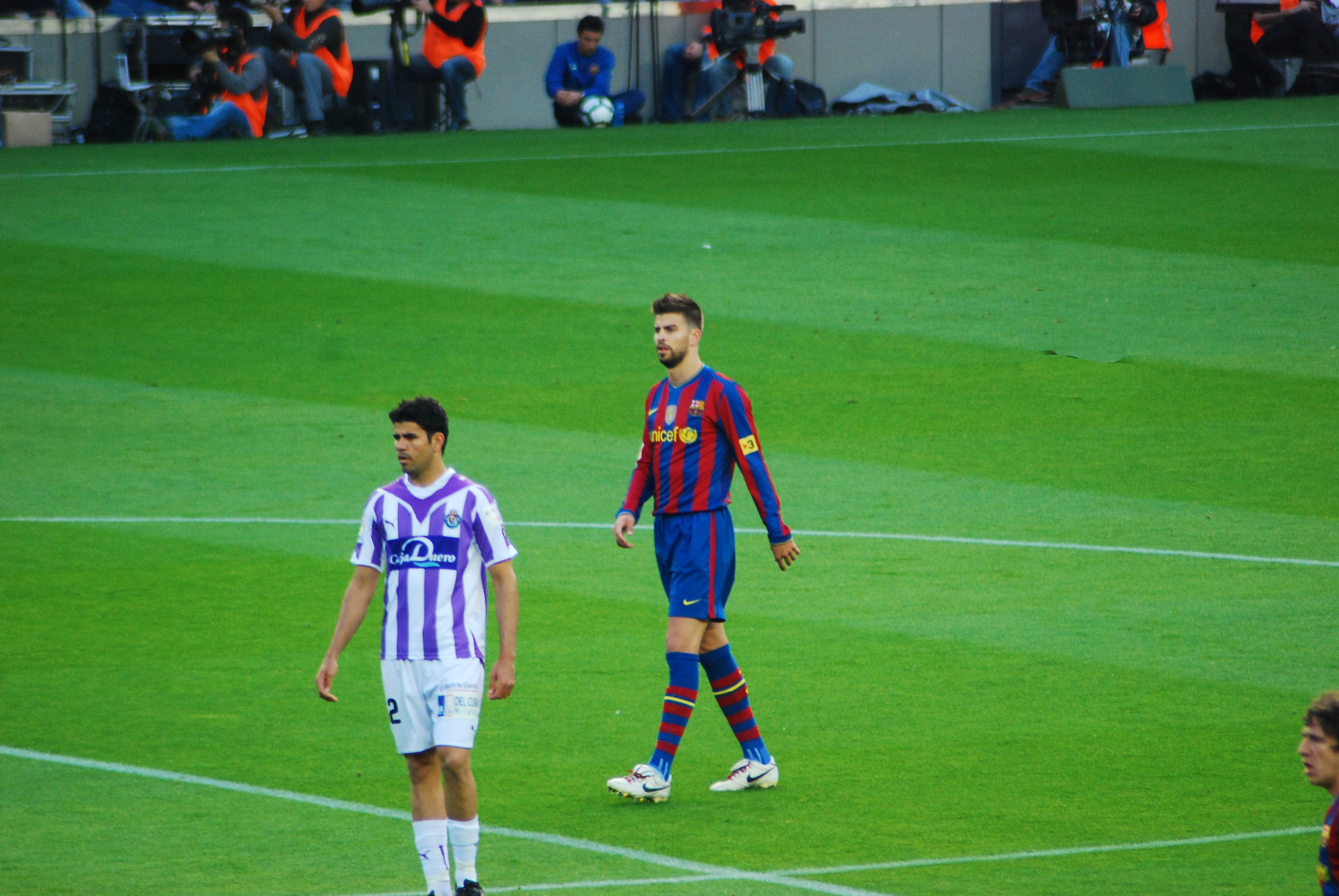
Diego Costa next to Gerard Piqué during an away fixture versus FC Barcelona in May 2010

After a slow start to 2009–10 (three wins in the first 20 matches), Mendilibar was sacked on 1 February 2010 following a draw at home against Almería. The week following his sacking, Valladolid dropped into the relegation zone (something that never happened during Mendilibar's 138-match stint), with former player Onésimo Sánchez taking charge.

After only one win in 10 matches, Sánchez was fired. Former Spain national team manager Javier Clemente was named Sánchez's replacement in a desperate move to avoid relegation with only eight matches remaining. After a brief breather (16th position), Valladolid again returned to the bottom three, then faced a must-win last game at the Camp Nou against a Barcelona squad needing a win to secure the Liga championship. Level in the standings with Racing de Santander, Málaga and Tenerife for the two final safe positions, Valladolid lost 0–4 and consequently was relegated, ending a three-year stay in the top flight.

The 2011–12 season saw Valladolid return to La Liga under the management of Miroslav Đukić, promoted through the play-offs after finishing third in the division.

Valladolid were relegated back to the Segunda División on the last matchday of the 2013–14 season.

In the 2017–18 season, Valladolid was promoted back to first division after four years via play-off defeating Sporting de Gijón and Numancia.

=== Ronaldo Nazário era (2018–2025) ===
In the summer of 2018, a series of purchase offers were presented by several foreign entrepreneurs. This process concluded with the acquisition led by the former Brazilian player Ronaldo Nazário, who was officially introduced as the majority shareholder and president of the board of directors on 3 September 2018. The presentation took place in the reception hall of the Valladolid City Hall. It is worth noting that the former president, Carlos Suárez, continued in the role of CEO until he resigned in August 2019.

When Ronaldo was introduced, the team had already completed the first three rounds of the 2018–19 La Liga season. Despite failing to score any goals, they managed to secure two draws out of three matches, largely due to their strong defensive performance. Their standing improved to 6th place by the 10th round, but a lack of goals combined with a deteriorating defense resulted in a series of unfavorable outcomes. Throughout April, they found themselves periodically in positions that could lead to relegation. However, the team's performance notably picked up in the final rounds of the season, ensuring their safety in the league mathematically one match prior to the end of the championship. As part of changes, Calero, who had performed well, was transferred to Espanyol for a fee of 8 million euros plus additional variables.

Sergio González Soriano continued as the coach for the 2019–20 season. The COVID-19 pandemic caused a pause in the season on 13 March when the team was in 15th place, four points above the relegation zone. The league resumed from mid-June to mid-July, with the team securing safety in the second-to-last round and finishing 13th, their best position in 18 seasons. Throughout the season, Valladolid avoided relegation positions, relying on effective but not flashy play. The standout was Salisu, a Ghanaian defender from the youth team, who excelled in defense. He was sold to Southampton FC for 12 million euros in the summer, a record sale for Valladolid. In January, Ronaldo signed high-profile player Ben Arfa, who played sparingly and left at the season's end.

On 23 May 2020, a preliminary agreement was announced with the Club Baloncesto Ciudad de Valladolid for collaboration between the two entities. The merger would result in the basketball club becoming a section within Real Valladolid. Among the changes would be alterations to the club's colors and the basketball team's name. On 10 July 2020, members of Atlético Tordesillas agreed to have the team become a subsidiary of Real Valladolid for one season, extendable over time. Atlético Tordesillas would retain its legal identity and board of directors. The agreement would bring young players from the Valladolid academy, a full coaching staff funded by Valladolid, training for lower division coaches at Tordesillas, supply of sports equipment, and the presence of Valladolid's groundskeepers to maintain the Tordesillas team's fields.

On 3 August 2020, a 3-year collaboration agreement was signed with Club Baloncesto Ciudad de Valladolid. The basketball team's name changed to Real Valladolid Baloncesto, adopting white and purple colors. David Espinar, the basketball team's director, joined the board of directors. This partnership aimed to attract resources, strengthen fan connections, and enhance public relations. On 21 August 2020, the agreement with Atlético Tordesillas was confirmed, making it the club's second subsidiary team..

The 2020–21 season began in September instead of August due to the COVID-19-induced pause. The RFEF established rules for the 2020–21 league that required teams in La Liga and Segunda División to find alternative stadiums for home matches in case COVID-19 complications prevented matches from being played at their regular venues. The preferred option was the Estadio Nueva Balastera in Palencia, provided it met the minimum requirements set by the LFP. The alternative, however, needed to be located outside the club's Autonomous Community. Therefore, stadiums in Madrid were the most likely candidates, and even the possibility of a mutual agreement to share the alternative stadium with another team was considered. Furthermore, during this season, five substitutions in three intervals per match would continue to be allowed. A protocol was designed to address issues like playing surfaces, schedules, first-team player numbers, and what would happen if matches couldn't be played or if positive COVID-19 cases were detected among teams, coaches, and players. The protocol also covered the promotion playoffs to La Liga.

On 18 September 2020, alternative venues for home matches were announced. The primary option was either the Estadio Santiago Bernabéu (depending on the progress of ongoing renovations) or the Estadio Alfredo Di Stéfano in Madrid. The secondary choices were the Estadio Ramón Sánchez-Pizjuán in Seville and the Estadio de Balaídos in Vigo. Additionally, Valladolid was a highly sought-after host city, being selected as the primary alternative venue by Real Madrid CF and Real Celta de Vigo to play their matches at the Estadio José Zorrilla. Atlético de Madrid, however, opted for another venue. Valladolid was also considered for the list of alternatives, with convenient flight connections in mind, with cities like Valencia and Málaga.

Despite the disappointing results, Real Valladolid had a slim chance of avoiding relegation until the very last matchday. They needed to beat the league champions, Atlético de Madrid, and hope their rivals didn't win their matches. Unfortunately, this scenario didn't play out, resulting in relegation as the second-to-last team. The club faced criticism from fans for not taking adequate measures to prevent relegation. Despite various challenges including injuries and COVID-19 absences, coach Sergio González Soriano remained in charge throughout the season, ultimately leading the team back to the lower division.

The following season, 2021–22, marked Real Valladolid's 36th season in the second tier. The main goal was to rekindle the fans' enthusiasm after one of the worst seasons in the club's history. On 22 June 2021, the subsidiary agreement with Atlético Tordesillas was terminated due to Real Valladolid's relegation. Despite this, the collaboration between the two clubs continued. After a somewhat inconsistent start, the team began 2022 with a strong defense, surpassing the team's previous unbeaten record. The earlier record was set in La Liga by César Sánchez, who went 555 minutes without conceding a goal. This achievement spanned from the 85th minute (goal by Julen Guerrero) of matchday 33 in the 1997–98 season to the 10th minute (goal by Predrag Mijatović) of matchday 2 in the 1998–99 season. Ultimately, the record was extended to 646 minutes by Jordi Masip between the 29th-minute goal by Borja Bastón on matchday 20 and the 45th-minute goal by Bernardo Espinosa on matchday 27. The team eventually secured direct promotion by defeating S.D. Huesca 3–0 in the final matchday, even though it relied on results from U.D. Almería and S.D. Eibar. These results materialized with Almería drawing at Butarque and Eibar surprisingly losing to A.D. Alcorcón, who had been relegated for several rounds. Despite this, Alcorcón finished as the bottom team in the second division. Valladolid concluded the season as runners-up, being the top goal-scorers with 71 goals, largely thanks to the 20 goals contributed by Israeli player Shon Weissman. Furthermore, they set a record by spending the fewest matchdays in direct promotion positions before securing promotion, achieving this in only 5 matchdays in total.

The 2022–23 season of La Liga began with Pacheta as the coach, following their promotion, and notable signings like the return of academy graduate Sergio Asenjo and Valladolid native Sergio Escudero. The season was marked by inconsistent performance, swinging between periods of positive and negative results, often conceding goals in the closing minutes of matches. The team managed to stay above the relegation zone until the break for the Qatar World Cup.

During the winter transfer window, new players were brought in to elevate the team's performance, but injuries hindered the contribution of some players. Paulo Pezzolano replaced Pacheta as the coach after the team conceded six goals in a single match. Despite Pezzolano's efforts, the team's irregular form persisted. In the final matchday, playing at home against Getafe, Valladolid was relegated, marking their fifth relegation in two decades, making them the most relegated team in the 21st century.

The day after relegation, President Ronaldo confirmed Pezzolano as the coach for the 2023–24 season. Just days before the new season's start, Fran Sánchez was dismissed, and Domingo Catoira took over as the sporting director. The fans' dissatisfaction with these changes, along with concerns about the team's direction and squad changes, were evident during the Trofeo Ciudad de Valladolid, with strong protests against the club's leadership, including chants calling for Ronaldo's departure.

The 24 April 2025, after the defeat vs. Betis, it was relegated to Second Division (La Liga 2).

On 23 May 2025, the club announced that Ronaldo agreed to selling the controlling stake to a group of investors.

=== Grupo Ignite era (2025–present) ===
On 1 July 2025, Víctor Orta was named Sporting Director.

== Stadium ==
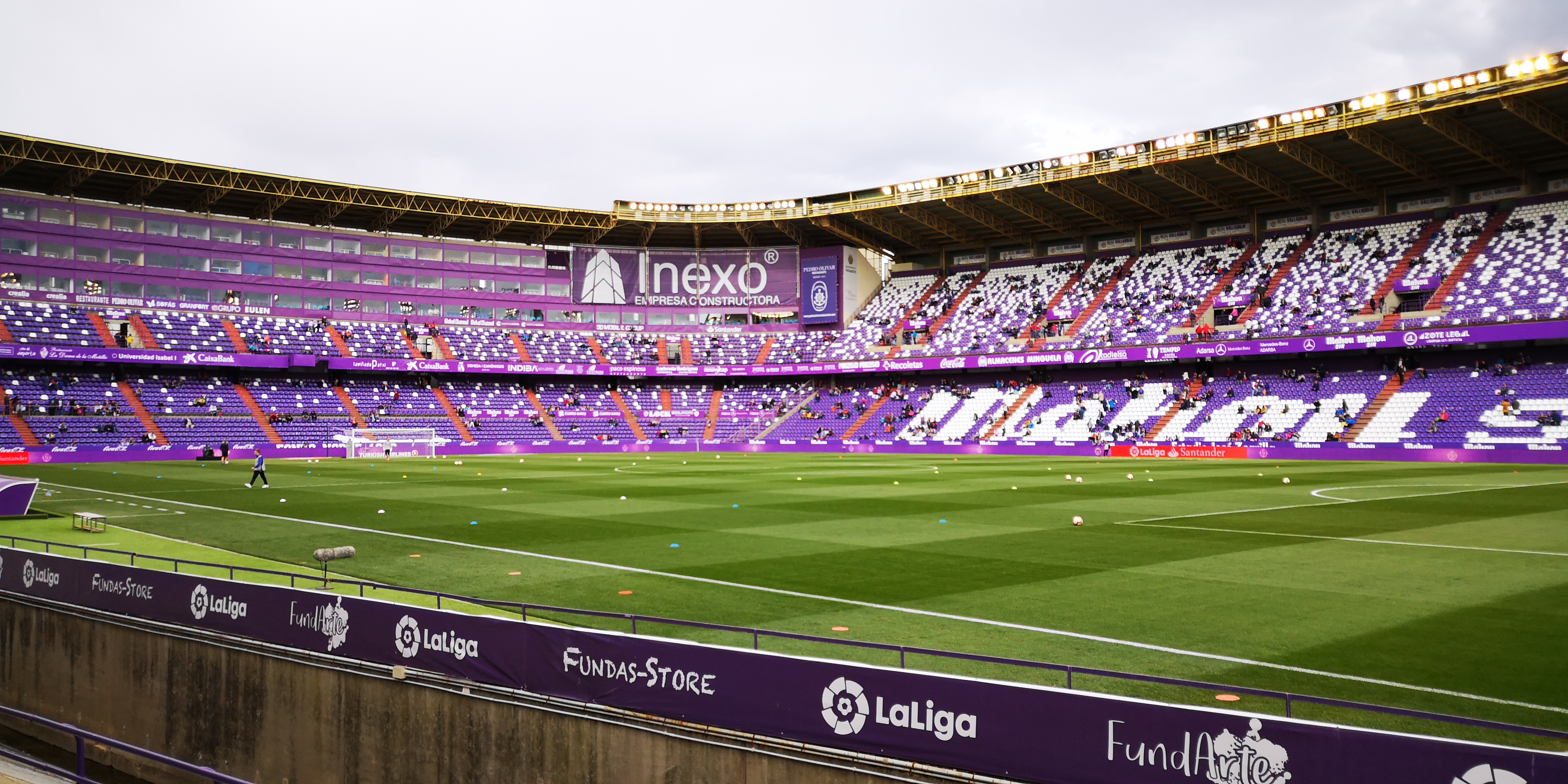
Estadio Nuevo José Zorrilla

Real Valladolid play at the 26,421-capacity Estadio Nuevo José Zorrilla, finished in 1982 to replace the previous stadium of the same name which had stood since 1940(increased its capacity from 27,846). Both grounds are named after José Zorrilla y Moral, a 19th-century poet from the city. After opening for the club on 20 February 1982, it hosted the Copa del Rey Final on 13 April of that year, and then three Group D matches at the 1982 FIFA World Cup. The venue is owned by the Ayuntamiento de Valladolid.

In 2010, it was announced that there were plans to expand the stadium to 40,000 spectators. This project was known as Valladolid Arena [baʎaˈðolið aˈɾena], but was contingent on Spain winning the right to host the 2018 FIFA World cup.

== Season to season ==
Real Valladolid's league positions

The following list shows Valladolid's record as well as all the presidents and coaches for every season since its foundation in 1929. All presidents and coaches are Spanish unless otherwise noted.

Season	Tier	Division	Place	President	Coach	Accomplishments
1929	3	3ª	6th	Pedro Zuloaga; Santos Rodríguez	(Hungary) István Plattkó	
1929–30	3	3ª	2nd	Santos Rodríguez	(Hungary) István Plattkó	
1930–31	3	3ª	2nd	José Cantalapiedra	Antón Achalandabaso	
1931–32	3	3ª	3rd	José Cantalapiedra	Antón Achalandabaso	
1932–33	3	3ª	1st	José Cantalapiedra	Antón Achalandabaso	
1933–34	3	3ª	1st	José Cantalapiedra	(Hungary) István Plattkó tekio	Promoted to 2ª
1934–35	2	2ª	2nd	José Cantalapiedra	(Hungary) István Plattkó tekio	
1935–36	2	2ª	4th	José Cantalapiedra	(Hungary) István Plattkó tekio	
1936–37	No competition			José Cantalapiedra	No competition was held due to Spanish Civil War	
1937–38	No competition			José Cantalapiedra	No competition was held due to Spanish Civil War	
1938–39	No competition			José Cantalapiedra	No competition was held due to Spanish Civil War	
1939–40	2	2ª	6th	José Cantalapiedra	(Hungary) István Plattkó; Manuel M. Ordax	
1940–41	2	2ª	10th	José Cantalapiedra	Juan Bilbao "Juanín"	
1941–42	2	2ª	5th	José Cantalapiedra	(Hungary) Károly Plattkó	
1942–43	2	2ª	2nd	José Cantalapiedra	(Hungary) Károly Plattkó	
1943–44	2	2ª	14th	José Cantalapiedra; José González	Alfonso Martínez; José Planas	Relegated to 3ª
1944–45	3	3ª	3rd	Germán Adánez; Ángel Soria	Quirico Arteaga	Runner-up Copa Federación
1945–46	3	3ª	1st	Ángel Soria	Antonio Barrios	
1946–47	3	3ª	1st	Juan Represa	Antonio Barrios	Promoted to 2ª
1947–48	2	2ª	1st	Juan Represa	Antonio Barrios	Promoted to La Liga
1948–49	1	1ª	12th	Juan Represa	(Argentina) (France) Helenio Herrera	
1949–50	1	1ª	9th	Juan Represa	Antonio Barrios; Julián Vaquero; Antonio Barrios	Spanish Cup: Runners-up (4–1 v. Athletic Bilbao)
1950–51	1	1ª	6th	Manuel González Aquiso	Juan Antonio Ipiña	
1951–52	1	1ª	8th	Ramón Pradera	Juan Antonio Ipiña	
1952–53	1	1ª	12th	Ramón Pradera	José Iraragorri	Winner Copa Federación
1953–54	1	1ª	12th	Ramón Pradera	Luis Miró	
1954–55	1	1ª	9th	Ramón Pradera	Luis Miró	
1955–56	1	1ª	9th	Ramón Pradera	Luis Miró	
1956–57	1	1ª	8th	Ramón Pradera	Rafael Yunta	
1957–58	1	1ª	15th	Ramón Pradera	Rafael Yunta; José Luis Saso	Relegated to 2ª
1958–59	2	2ª	1st	Carlos del Río Hortega	José Luis Saso	Promoted to La Liga
1959–60	1	1ª	13th	Carlos del Río Hortega	José Luis Saso	
1960–61	1	1ª	15th	Carlos del Río Hortega	José Luis Saso; Pedro Eguiluz; Paco Lesmes	Relegated to 2ª
1961–62	2	2ª	2nd	José Miguel Arrarte	Paco Lesmes; Manuel Soler (Paraguay) Heriberto Herrera	Promoted to La Liga
1962–63	1	1ª	4th	José Miguel Arrarte	Antonio Ramallets	
1963–64	1	1ª	16th	José Miguel Arrarte	Ángel Zubieta; Paco Lesmes	Relegated to 2ª
1964–65	2	2ª	3rd	José Miguel Arrarte	(Hungary) Janos Kalmar; Julián Vaquero	
1965–66	2	2ª	4th	José Luis Saso	Antonio Barrios; Antonio Ramallets	
1966–67	2	2ª	9th	José Luis Saso	Pedro Torres; Héctor Martín; Emilio Aldecoa; Héctor Martín; Emilio Aldecoa; Héctor Martín	
1967–68	2	2ª	2nd	Antonio Alfonso	José Molinuevo; Enrique Orizaola	
1968–69	2	2ª	10th	Antonio Alfonso	Antonio Barrios; Enrique Orizaola	
1969–70	2	2ª	17th	Antonio Alfonso	José Antonio Olmedo; José Luis Saso; Gerardo Coque	Relegated to 3ª
1970–71	3	3ª	2nd	Santiago Gallego	Gerardo Coque; Héctor Martín	Promoted to 2ª
1971–72	2	2ª	7th	Santiago Gallego	Héctor Martín	
1972–73	2	2ª	5th	Santiago Gallego	Héctor Martín	
1973–74	2	2ª	7th	Santiago Gallego	Gustau Biosca; Fernando Redondo	
1974–75	2	2ª	11th	Fernando Alonso	Fernando Redondo; Santiago Vázquez (Germany) Rudi Gutendorf	
1975–76	2	2ª	4th	Fernando Alonso	(Uruguay) Héctor Núñez	
1976–77	2	2ª	12th	Fernando Alonso	Luis Aloy; José Luis Saso	
1977–78	2	2ª	7th	Fernando Alonso	Francisco García "Paquito"	
1978–79	2	2ª	4th	Gonzalo Alonso	Enrique Pérez "Pachín"	
1979–80	2	2ª	2nd	Gonzalo Alonso	Eusebio Ríos	Promoted to La Liga
1980–81	1	1ª	12th	Gonzalo Alonso	Francisco García "Paquito"	
1981–82	1	1ª	9th	Gonzalo Alonso	Francisco García "Paquito"	
1982–83	1	1ª	12th	Manuel Esteban	(Argentina) Felipe Mesones; Santi Llorente; José Luis García Traid	
1983–84	1	1ª	14th	Pedro San Martín; Mariano Hernández; Gonzalo Alonso	José Luis García Traid; Fernando Redondo	League Cup: Winners (Agg. 3–0 vs. Atlético)
1984–85	1	1ª	13th	Gonzalo Alonso	Fernando Redondo	
1985–86	1	1ª	10th	Gonzalo Alonso	(Argentina) (Chile) Vicente Cantatore	
1986–87	1	1ª	10th	Gonzalo Alonso; José Agad; Miguel Ángel Pérez Herrán	(Argentina) (Chile) Vicente Cantatore; Xabier Azkargorta; Antonio Sánchez Santos; José Pérez Garcia	
1987–88	1	1ª	8th	Miguel Ángel Pérez Herrán	(Argentina) (Chile) Vicente Cantatore	
1988–89	1	1ª	6th	Miguel Ángel Pérez Herrán	(Argentina) (Chile) Vicente Cantatore	Spanish Cup: Runners-up (1–0 vs. Real Madrid)
1989–90	1	1ª	16th	Miguel Ángel Pérez Herrán; Carlos García Zúñiga	(Socialist Federal Republic of Yugoslavia) Josip Skoblar; José Moré; Fernando Redondo	
1990–91	1	1ª	9th	Gonzalo Gonzalo	(Colombia) "Pacho" Maturana	
1991–92	1	1ª	19th	Gonzalo Gonzalo; Andrés Martín; Marcos Fernández Fernández	(Colombia) "Pacho" Maturana; Javier Yepes Peñas	Relegated to 2ª
1992–93	2	2ª	2nd	Marcos Fernández Fernández	Marco Antonio Boronat; José Luis Saso (Argentina) Felipe Mesones	Promoted to La Liga
1993–94	1	1ª	18th	Marcos Fernández Fernández	(Argentina) Felipe Mesones; José Moré	
1994–95	1	1ª	19th	Marcos Fernández Fernández	(Uruguay) Víctor Espárrago; José Moré; Fernando Redondo; Antonio Sánchez Santos	
1995–96	1	1ª	16th	Marcos Fernández Fernández	Rafael Benítez; Antonio Sánchez Santos (Argentina) (Chile) Vicente Cantatore	
1996–97	1	1ª	7th	Marcos Fernández Fernández	(Argentina) (Chile) Vicente Cantatore	
1997–98	1	1ª	11th	Marcos Fernández Fernández; Marcos Fernández Fermoselle	(Argentina) (Chile) Vicente Cantatore; Antonio Sánchez Santos (Croatia) Sergije Krešić	
1998–99	1	1ª	12th	Marcos Fernández Fermoselle	(Croatia) Sergije Krešić	
1999–2000	1	1ª	8th	Marcos Fernández Fermoselle; Ángel Fernández Fermoselle; Ignacio Lewin	Gregorio Manzano	
2000–01	1	1ª	16th	Ignacio Lewin; Carlos Suárez	(Argentina) Francisco "Pancho" Ferraro; José Moré	
2001–02	1	1ª	12th	Carlos Suárez	José Moré	
2002–03	1	1ª	14th	Carlos Suárez	José Moré	
2003–04	1	1ª	18th	Carlos Suárez	Fernando Vázquez; Antonio Sánchez Santos	Relegated to 2ª
2004–05	2	2ª	6th	Carlos Suárez	(Croatia) Sergije Krešić; Marcos Alonso	
2005–06	2	2ª	10th	Carlos Suárez	Marcos Alonso; Alfredo Merino	
2006–07	2	2ª	1st	Carlos Suárez	José Luis Mendilibar	Promoted to La Liga
2007–08	1	1ª	15th	Carlos Suárez	José Luis Mendilibar	
2008–09	1	1ª	15th	Carlos Suárez	José Luis Mendilibar	
2009–10	1	1ª	18th	Carlos Suárez	José Luis Mendilibar; Onésimo Sánchez; Javier Clemente	Relegated to 2ª
2010–11	2	2ª	7th	Carlos Suárez	Antonio Gómez; Abel Resino	Qualified for Promotion play-off
2011–12	2	2ª	3rd	Carlos Suárez	(Serbia) Miroslav Đukić	Qualified for Promotion play-off Promoted to La Liga
2012–13	1	1ª	14th	Carlos Suárez	(Serbia) Miroslav Đukić	
2013–14	1	1ª	19th	Carlos Suárez	Juan Ignacio Martínez	Relegated to 2ª
2014–15	2	2ª	5th	Carlos Suárez	Rubi	Qualified for Promotion play-off
2015–16	2	2ª	16th	Carlos Suárez	Gaizka Garitano; Miguel Ángel Portugal; Alberto López	
2016–17	2	2ª	7th	Carlos Suárez	Paco Herrera	
2017–18	2	2ª	5th	Carlos Suárez	Luis César Sampedro; Sergio González	Qualified for Promotion play-off Promoted to La Liga
2018–19	1	1ª	16th	(Brazil) Ronaldo	Sergio González	
2019–20	1	1ª	13th	(Brazil) Ronaldo	Sergio González	
2020–21	1	1ª	19th	(Brazil) Ronaldo	Sergio González	Relegated to 2ª
2021–22	2	2ª	2nd	(Brazil) Ronaldo	Pacheta	Promoted to 1ª
2022–23	1	1ª	18th	(Brazil) Ronaldo	Pacheta (Uruguay) Paulo Pezzolano	Relegated to 2ª
2023–24	2	2ª	2nd	(Brazil) Ronaldo	(Uruguay) Paulo Pezzolano	Promoted to La Liga
2024–25	1	1ª	20th	(Brazil) Ronaldo	(Uruguay) Paulo Pezzolano; Álvaro Rubio (caretaker) (Argentina) Diego Cocca; Álvaro Rubio	Relegated to 2ª
2025–26	2	2ª	17th	(Mexico) Gabriel Solares	(Uruguay) Guillermo Almada; Sisi (caretaker); Luis Tevenet; Fran Escribá	
2026–27	2	2ª		(Mexico) Gabriel Solares	Fran Escribá	

- 47 seasons in La Liga
- 40 seasons in Segunda División (Note: Including 1929 Segunda División Grupo B.)
- 9 seasons in Tercera División

=== European competition history ===
Season	Competition	Round	Club	Home	Away	Aggregate
1984–85	UEFA Cup	First round	(Socialist Federal Republic of Yugoslavia) Rijeka	1–0	1–4	2–4
1989–90	UEFA Cup Winners' Cup	First round	(Malta) Ħamrun Spartans	5–0	1–0	6–0
1989–90	UEFA Cup Winners' Cup	Second round	(Sweden) Djurgårdens IF	2–0	2–2	4–2
1989–90	UEFA Cup Winners' Cup	Quarter-finals	(France) Monaco	0–0	0–0 (a.e.t.)	0–0 (1–3 p)
1997–98	UEFA Cup	First round	(Latvia) Skonto	2–0	0–1	2–1
1997–98	UEFA Cup	Second round	(Russia) Spartak Moscow	1–2	0–2	1–4

== Current squad ==
As of 1 October 2026

Note: Flags indicate national team as defined under FIFA eligibility rules; some limited exceptions apply. Players may hold more than one non-FIFA nationality.

No.	Pos.	Nation	Player
1	GK	ESP	Álvaro Aceves
2	DF	ESP	Trilli
3	DF	QAT	Homam Ahmed (on loan from Al-Duhail)
4	DF	ESP	David Torres
5	DF	ESP	Ramón Martínez
6	MF	FRA	Mathis Lachuer
7	MF	ESP	Luis Chacón
8	MF	ARG	Thiago Ojeda
9	FW	ESP	Juanmi Latasa
10	MF	JPN	Ryōtarō Itō
11	MF	ESP	Yeray Cabanzón
12	DF	ESP	Miguel Rubio
13	GK	ESP	Dani Martín (on loan from Levante)
14	DF	ESP	Iván Alejo
15	DF	ESP	Pablo Tomeo

No.	Pos.	Nation	Player
16	MF	GEQ	Álex Balboa
17	FW	ESP	Víctor Barberá
18	DF	ESP	Carlos Clerc
19	FW	ESP	Adrián Arnu
20	FW	NED	Robin van Duiven
21	MF	FRA	Julien Ponceau
22	MF	NED	Kaj de Rooij
23	MF	ISR	Tay Abed (on loan from Levante)
24	MF	CRO	Stanko Jurić
26	GK	ARG	Lucas Lavagnino
27	DF	ESP	Iván Garriel
28	MF	ESP	Dani Pérez
30	MF	ESP	Víctor Fernández (on loan from Valencia)
—	DF	ESP	Guille Bueno

=== Reserve team ===
Note: Flags indicate national team as defined under FIFA eligibility rules; some limited exceptions apply. Players may hold more than one non-FIFA nationality.

No.	Pos.	Nation	Player
31	GK	ESP	Hugo Wauthier
32	MF	ESP	Marcos Parriego
33	FW	ESP	Tomy Fernández

No.	Pos.	Nation	Player
34	FW	NGR	Brain Chinedu
35	DF	ESP	Alejandro Galdeano
37	MF	ESP	Hugo Calvo

=== Out on loan ===
Note: Flags indicate national team as defined under FIFA eligibility rules; some limited exceptions apply. Players may hold more than one non-FIFA nationality.

No.	Pos.	Nation	Player
—	GK	ESP	Álvaro de Pablo (at Betis Deportivo until 30 June 2027)
—	DF	ESP	José Luis Aranda (at Ponferradina until 30 June 2027)
—	MF	URU	Lucas Sanseviero (at Instituto until 31 December 2027)

No.	Pos.	Nation	Player
—	MF	BRA	Riki de Morais (at Mirandés until 30 June 2027)
—	FW	BRA	Marcos André (at Al-Najma until 30 June 2027)

=== Technical staff ===
Position	Staff
Head coach	(Spain) Fran Escribá
Assistant coach	(Spain) David Generelo
Fitness coach	(Spain) Julen Masach (Spain) Fran Albert
Technical assistant	(Spain) Sisi
Goalkeeper coach	(Portugal) Pedro Ferrer
Load control	(Spain) Sergio Sánchez
Analyst	(Spain) Sergio Trinchet
Delegate	(Spain) Manuel Rodríguez
Equipment manager	(Cuba) Justo Camacho (Spain) Álvaro Fernández
Doctor	(Spain) José María Lomo (Spain) Alberto López Moreno
Head of performance department	(Spain) Fran Albert
Rehab fitness coach	(Spain) José Luis Quintero Illera
Nutritionist	(Spain) Andrea de la Cruz Garijo
Physiotherapist	(Spain) Sergio Alija (Spain) José Ángel (Spain) Miguel Ángel Rodríguez (Spain) Rodrigo Herrero
Podiatrist	(Spain) Juan Baticón

Last updated: 11 August 2026
Source: Real Valladolid (in Spanish)

== Kit ==
Since its founding in 1928, Real Valladolid has worn a home uniform of purple and white stripes. This design was chosen to distinguish the club from others and has remained largely unchanged. Purple and white have become the team’s official colors and an integral part of its identity.

During the 2012–13 season, Real Valladolid showed their support for Madrid's bid to host the 2020 Olympics by wearing a special shirt for their match against Real Madrid at the Santiago Bernabéu Stadium. The shirt featured black and purple stripes with eye-catching orange numbers on the back.

On September 24, 2023, Real Valladolid had to play their match at the Carlos Tartiere Stadium against Real Oviedo wearing a fourth kit. This is because the Technical Committee of Referees (CTA) considered that the three kits of the pucelano team have violet as the predominant color and considered that they are similar to the first kit of the Asturian team, despite having played other seasons with the first kit, replacing the white shorts with violet ones. The Promesas wore their previously mentioned kit without issue during their Segunda Federación match against Real Oviedo Vetusta last week. This kit consisted of a yellow shirt and socks, along with violet shorts carried over from their second kit.

== Honours ==
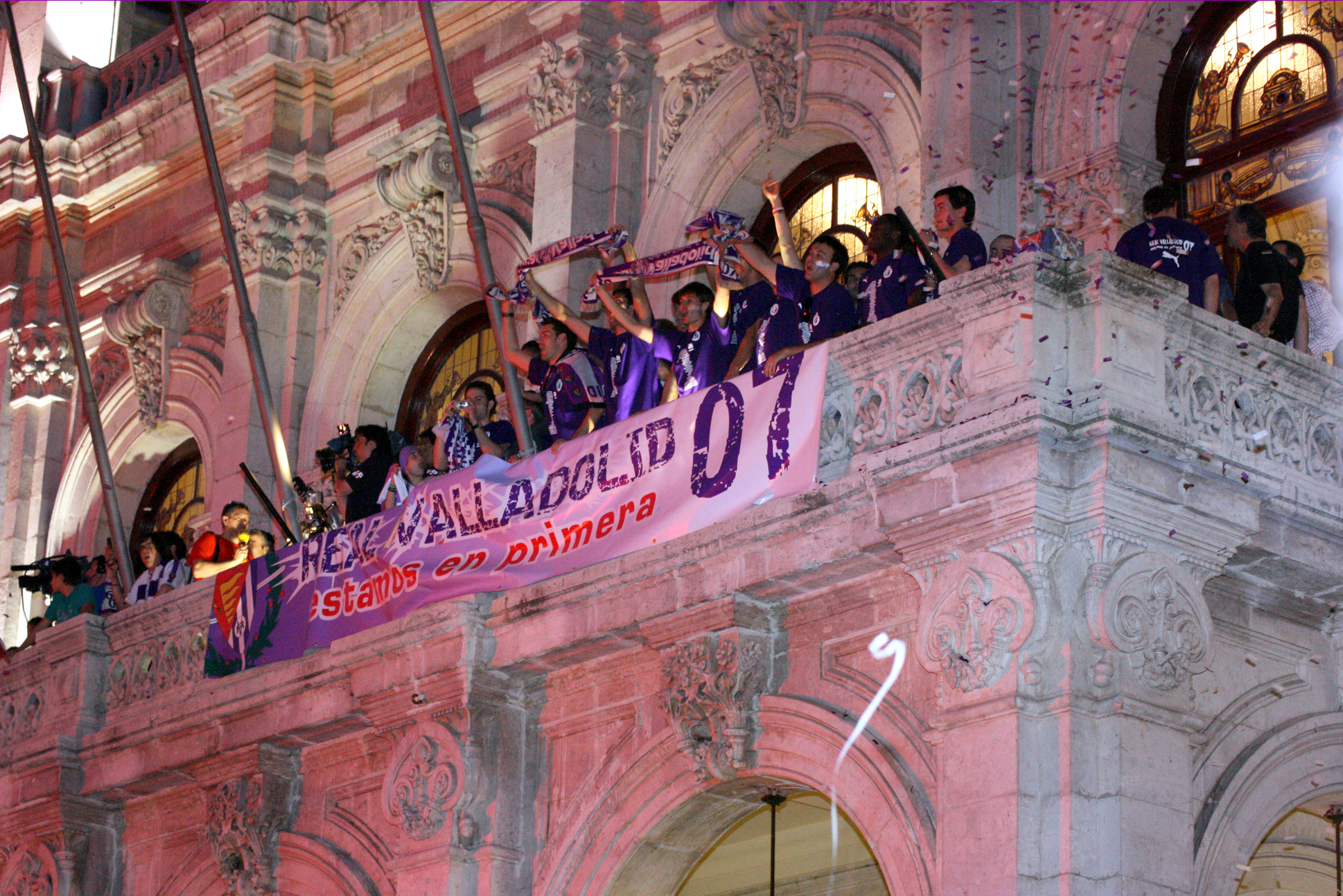
Valladolid players celebrating their 2007 promotion to La Liga on the balcony of the City Hall

=== League ===
- Segunda División: 1947–48, 1958–59, 2006–07
- Tercera División: 1933–34
- Castilla-León Championship: 1930–31

=== Cups ===
- Copa Real Federación Española de Fútbol: 1952–53
- Teide Trophy: 1983
- Copa de la Liga: 1984
- Castilla y León Cup: 1985

Records

- Most games unbeaten in Segunda División: 29 (2006–07)
- Earliest promotion in Segunda División: day 34 (out of 42), 22 April 2007
- Fastest goal in La Liga history: 7.42 seconds; scored by Joseba Llorente on 20 January 2008, vs Espanyol (2–1 win)

== See also ==
- Real Valladolid B – Valladolid's B team
- Real Valladolid (women)
