= Luis Adaro Magro =

Spanish engineer, businessman, and industrialist

Luis Adaro y Magro
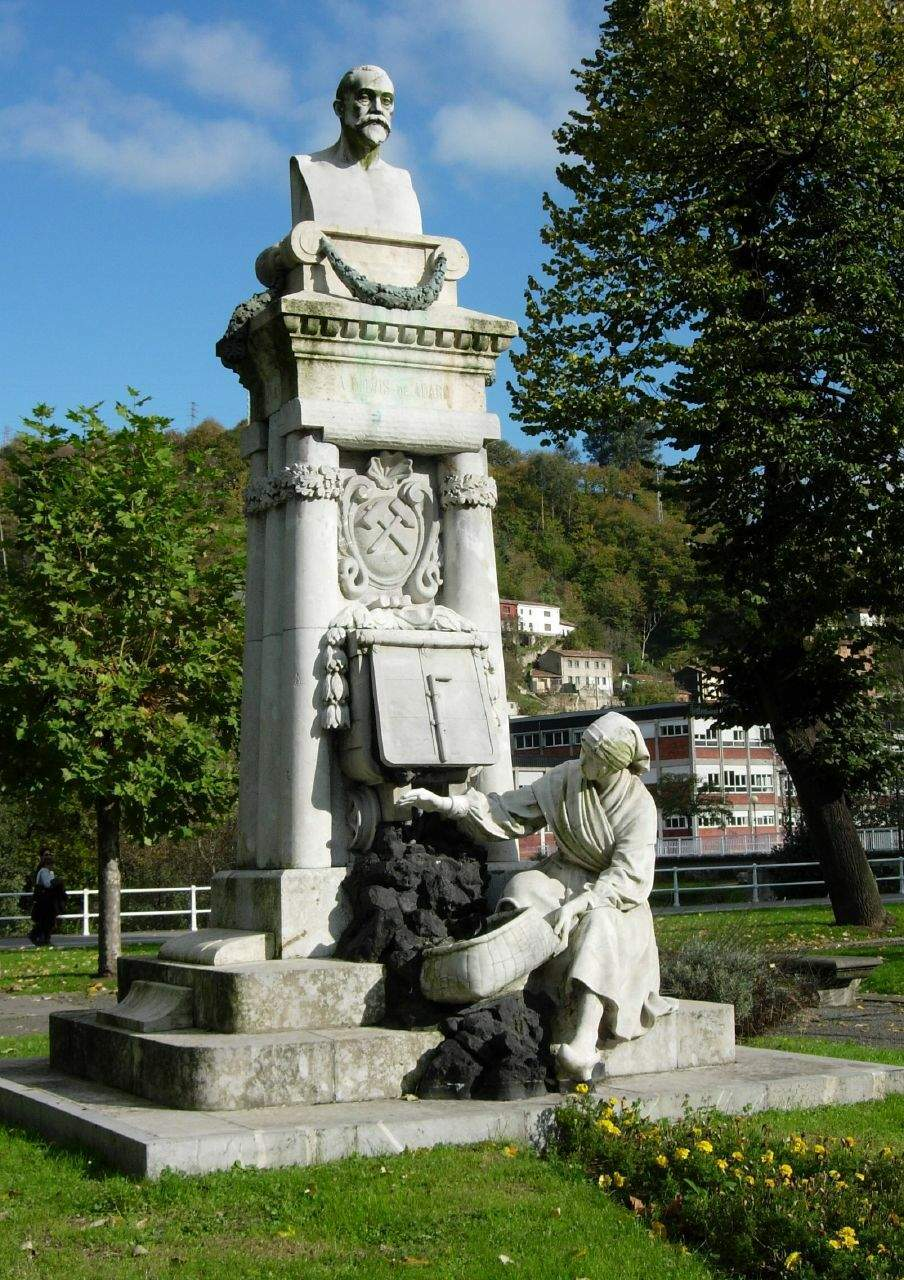
- La Carbonera, monument to Luis Adaro in the park of Sama de Langreo
- Born: 17 April 1849; Madrid, Spain
- Died: 21 October 1915 (aged 66); Madrid, Spain
- Occupations: Engineer; Businessman; Entrepreneur
- Known for: Installed the first mechanical laundry in Asturias
- Children: Luis Adaro Porcel

President of the Gijón Chamber of Commerce

Luis Adaro y Magro (17 April 1849 – 21 October 1915) was a Spanish engineer and businessman, who was one of the most important figures in the mining and metallurgical history of Asturias and in the general development of this region at the end of the 19th century.

He was the father of Luis Adaro Porcel and the grandfather of Luis Adaro Ruiz-Falcó; the Adaro family was a key family in the industrial and economic development of Asturias.

== Early life and education ==
Luis Adaro Magro was born in Madrid on 17 April 1849, as the son of José María Eugenio Luis Gonzaga de Adaro y Ruiz and María Salomé Magro y Mozo. His father was a secretary of the Spanish Ministry of Industry during the last governments of Regent Maria Cristina and all those of Isabella II. He married Asunción Porcel, and the couple had four children.

He enrolled in the Special School of Mining Engineers in 1865, aged 16, but before completing his engineering degree in 1872, he traveled across Europe, where he established a significant connection with banker Adolphe d'Eichthal, a relationship that would greatly impact his career.

== Professional career ==
=== Mining ===
Adaro did his internship in the Almadén mines and then was assigned to the mining district of Asturias, where in 1874–75, he directed the Société d'Eichthal et compagnie, the company that owned the Mosquitera Mine. D’Eichtal also entrusted him with managing the Langreo and Siero mines, which he had acquired in 1871 alongside the Grand Duchess of Leuchtemberg. Shortly after, he was entrusted with the La Justa mines, property of the Baron del Castillo de Chirel, and the María Luisa mines, belonging to the Marquesado de Guadalmina.

In 1883, Adaro published in Madrid his Informe sobre la fusión de minas ("Report on the Merger of Mines"), advocating for the modernization of the fragmented and inefficient Asturian mining industry. In the following year, he did exactly that, by merging the D'Eichtal's mines with both the María Luisa and La Justa mines, which led to the creation of the Hullera Union (UH), which continued acquiring additional mines. Under Adaro's leadership, mechanization and modernization efforts transformed the underdeveloped Spanish mining industry, managing to increase the capital of the UH to 5,500,000 pesetas in just over five years. He also installed the first mechanical laundry in Asturias, the one located in the Mosquitera pit, using his experience to direct the installation of many others.

=== Coal industry ===
"He was one of the very first Spanish mining engineers who abandoned the well-trodden and dull career of a civil servant to devote himself to the task of an enterprising businessman, capable of fighting tirelessly in adverse conditions, to lay the foundations for the emerging Asturian coal and steel industry at the beginning of the 20th century."

— Ramón Mañana in his biography of Adaro Magro.

At the time, Spain's coal production was under 300,000 tons, a stark contrast to Great Britain's 65 million tons and the 5–7 million tons produced by France and Germany, so Adaro promoted the strengthening of the Asturian coal industry, publishing a pamphlet in 1878 entitled Los carbones asturianos y la Marina de Guerra ("Asturian coal and the Navy"), in which he criticized Spain's dependence on British coal and called for an increase in the consumption of Spanish coal. His warnings proved well-founded because two decades later, in 1898, the British suppliers refused to provide coal to Spanish warships passing through the Suez Canal, which paved the way to Spain's defeat in the Spanish–American War.

Adaro was part of numerous official commissions for studies and tariffs and protection of the coal industry, taking personal charge of the management of the Soto del Rey-Ciaño Santa Ana branch of the Northern Railway.

=== Steel ===
Adaro also played a key role in the steel industry; in 1900, Adaro joined the board of directors of Sociedad Metalúrgica Duro Felguera (SMDF), and in 1906, he orchestrated the crucial merger between UH into SMDF, a move that rescued the company from financial turmoil and positioned it as Spain's leading metallurgy firm, with Adaro as its general manager since 1907, but then SMDF faced its worst crisis in 1908–1909, and the board lost confidence in Adaro, who left in 1909; his exit only deepened the company's struggles.

Returning to Madrid, Adaro took charge of the Geological Map Commission of Spain in 1909.

=== Others ===
Adaro collaborated in the launching of the Avilés Port Union and advocated, together with Alejandro Pidal y Mon, for the muselist solution in the controversy over the appropriate location for the port of Gijón. He was the first president of the Gijón Chamber of Commerce, a position from which he promoted an international exhibition that was held at the end of the century in this city.

In 1901, Adaro co-founded the company Adaro y Marín, the precursor of Adaro Tecnologías, and he was also the driving force behind the creation of very important entities for Asturias, such as the Banco de Crédito Gijonés or the Caja de Ahorros de Asturias.

== Sporting career ==
Adaro was also involved in the foundation of Gijón Sport Club, the first football club in the region.

== Writing career ==
In the early 1910s, Adaro published several books, including two in 1912, Introducción al estudio de los criaderos de hierro de España... ("Introduction to the study of the iron deposits of Spain...") and La industria hullera española el abastecimiento de la Escuadra ("The Spanish coal industry supplies the Squadron"). His pioneering studies on iron ore deposits and the northern extension of the Central Asturian Basin, which supported the viability of the La Camocha mine in Gijón, gained increasing recognition over time.

Shortly before his death, Adaro published "Information on the crisis of the coal market in Spain, and proposed measures to the Government", which was edited by the Commission for the Study of National Coal Wealth, an entity of which he was president; this work was very useful for the work of the Commissions and Boards created to deal with the coal crisis derived from the First World War.

== Death and legacy ==
Adaro died in Madrid on 21 October 1915, at the age of 66.

Following his death, the La Montera society sought to honor his legacy with a commemorative monument; this project that was assigned to Sevillian sculptor Lorenzo Coullaut Varela, who was highly esteemed in his field. Funded through a public subscription, the monument dedicated to Luis Adaro was unveiled on 25 July 1918, aligning with the celebrations of Santiago.

== Works ==
- Los carbones nacionales y la marina de guerra (1878)
- Informe sobre la fusión de minas (1883)
- Nota acerca de la constitución geológica de Guelaya (1910)
- Introducción al estudio de los criaderos de hierro de España... (1912)
- La industria hullera española el abastecimiento de la Escuadra (1912)
- Cuenca carbonífera de Asturias (1914)
- Información relativa a la crisis del mercado hullero en España, y medidas propuestas al Gobierno (1915)
