= Luis Adaro Porcel =

Spanish footballer (1883–1948)

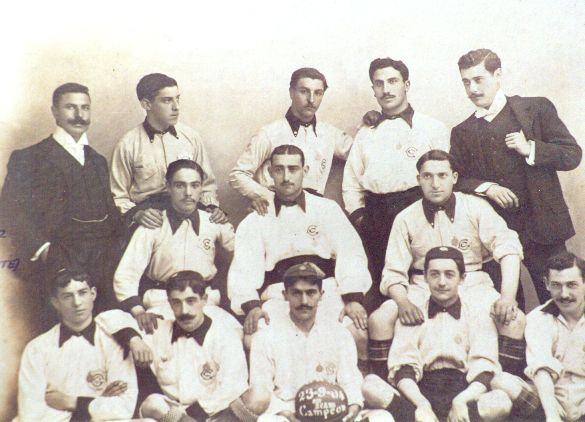
- Adaro (sitting on the floor, with the ball on his hands) in 1902

Personal information
- Full name: Luis Adaro y Porcel
- Date of birth: 24 February 1883
- Place of birth: Gijón, Spain
- Date of death: 1 June 1948 (aged 65)
- Place of death: Gijón, Spain
- Position: Goalkeeper

Senior career*
Years	Team	Apps	(Gls)
1898–1900	FC Château de Lancy		
1902–1905	Gijón Sport		

Managerial career
- Gijón Sport
- 1925: Sporting de Gijón
- * Club domestic league appearances and goals

Luis Adaro y Porcel (24 February 1883 – 1 June 1948) was a Spanish footballer who played as a goalkeeper for Gijón Sport. He was one of the most important figures in the amateur beginnings of football in Gijón, being one of the main introducers of this sport in Gijón as well as the fundamental head behind the foundation of the first football club in the region, Gijón Sport.

== Early life and education ==
Adaro was born in Gijón on 24 February 1883, as the son of Luis Adaro Magro, a successful businessman from Madrid, who was one of the most important figures in the mining and metallurgical history of Asturias. He studied in the boarding school run by the Augustinian Fathers in El Escorial, where he excelled in athletics and mountaineering.

As the son of a well-off family, he was sent abroad to complete his high school and pre-university studies in Switzerland, at the Château de Lancy. During his years in Switzerland, Adaro developed a deep interest in football, playing this sport with the team of this academic center, the so-called FC Château de Lancy, a historic Swiss collegiate team that even took part in the first national competition in Switzerland back in 1897–98. He can be seen in a photograph of this team from 1898, which is the first graphic example of a Gijón native forming part of a football team. Later, Porcel coincided with the Gijón natives Juan and José Luis Alvargonzález, as well as Demetrio Castrillón.

== Football career ==
=== First steps ===
Adaro took advantage of the summer holidays, in which he returned to Gijón, to bring his newly founded passion to his homeland and to practice this new sport there, starting in 1900, on the San Lorenzo beach, with a group of friends who, for the most part, had also known him during their time as students in Switzerland and Germany, such as the Alvargonzálezes (Juan and his cousins, José Luis and Romualdo), as well as Ismael Figaredo. It was Adaro, however, who obtained the goals and equipment necessary for those first games in Gijón. He continued to practice even after he completed his studies as a mechanical engineer in Germany.

In July 1901, his father established two coal loaders at the port of El Musel, so Adaro took advantage of this to organize football matches between his fellow students and the crews of the foreign ships, who until then only played matches among themselves.

=== Founding Gijón Sport ===
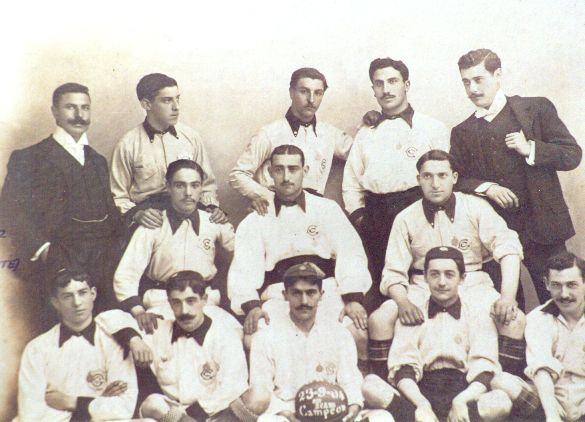
Adaro (sitting on the floor, with the ball on his hands) with the Gijón Sport team in 1902.

In the following year, in 1902, Adaro, together with his friends, founded Gijón Sport, which was the first football club in Gijón, official or otherwise. However, it also a multi-sport and cultural club that provided shelter for other disciplines, such as pedestrianism, cycling, chess, and theatre. It was only in December 1903 that Gijón Sport was officially registered, with José Suárez Sánchez as its first president. The club's main driving force was Adaro Porcel, who had the financial and human support of José Suárez Sánchez, Paco Marrodán, and Pedro Sánchez.

The Gijón Sport began organizing daily football matches at the Prau Redondo (Redondo meadow), next to the Obispo road, not too far from the factory that Adaro's father had founded two years before. In the sporting field he was, in addition to being a founder, a player and a coach for Gijón Sport, although this second term would take years to be coined, so he was then called sports director. Likewise, on 17 August 1903, Adaro was the goalkeeper and captain of the Gijón Sport team that played its first official match at the Redondo meadow, beating a certain Oviedo Foot-Ball Club. Around 1910, the club moved to a piece of land next to a flour mill owned by the Alvargonzález brothers, which eventually became known as El Molinón.

=== Sporting de Gijón ===
Gijón Sport served as a reference for other young people and teams of the time, such as Sporting de Gijón, founded in 1916, with Adaro joining its ranks as a member and then forming the only pair of coaches in its history, since he co-managed the first Gijón team with Manuel Argüelles after Edmundo Morán had resigned as coach in 1925. Adaro never played for Sporting, although he was a member of the majority of the various boards of directors that ran the club until his death. He later became the club's director, with the position of member, under the presidency of Secundido Felgueroso, and it was his idea to hire the first physical trainer that the entity had, Carlos Blond, for the 1943–44 season, and this decision paid off very well because that season ended with the first promotion of Sporting to the highest category of Spanish football.

== Outside football ==
Adaro remained always involved in all the sporting and cultural events that interested Gijón, while also developing his work as an engineer in the company Aleaciones y Manufacturas Metálicas, and later as director of Adaro y Marín and of the Sociedad Anónima Adaro, all of which founded by his father.

He eventually took over the company founded by his father, where he always shared his social concern for the safety of his workers (with whom he shared the company's profits by instituting profit sharing), hence why he introduced the first safety lamp for miners in 1914.

== Later and personal life ==
Adaro was the father of Luis Adaro Ruiz-Falcó, another very important figure in the economic development of Gijón. In fact, Adaro Porcel was also the promoter of the first Trade Fair of Asturias, which his son would later develop with great success.

Adaro died in Gijón on 1 June 1948, at the age of 65.
