= 2023–24 Real Valladolid season =

Real Valladolid
2023–24 season
- President: Ronaldo
- Head coach: Paulo Pezzolano
- Stadium: Estadio José Zorrilla
- Segunda División: 2nd (promoted)
- Copa del Rey: Second round
- Top goalscorer: League: Mamadou Sylla (8); All: Mamadou Sylla (8)
- Average home league attendance: 17,826
Home colours	colours	colours

The 2023–24 season was Real Valladolid's 96th season in existence and the club's first season back in the Segunda División, the second division of Spanish football, since 2022. They also competed in the Copa del Rey.

== Players ==
=== First-team squad ===
As of 13 February 2024

Note: Flags indicate national team as defined under FIFA eligibility rules; some limited exceptions apply. Players may hold more than one non-FIFA nationality.

No.	Pos.	Nation	Player
1	GK	ESP	Jordi Masip (captain)
2	DF	ESP	Luis Pérez
3	DF	ESP	David Torres
4	MF	ESP	Víctor Meseguer (on loan from Granada)
5	DF	ESP	Javi Sánchez
6	DF	CMR	Enzo Boyomo
7	FW	SEN	Mamadou Sylla
8	MF	ESP	Monchu
9	FW	BRA	Marcos André
10	MF	ESP	Iván Sánchez
11	MF	ESP	Raúl Moro (on loan from Lazio)
12	DF	BRA	Lucas Oliveira (on loan from Cruzeiro)
13	GK	POR	André Ferreira (on loan from Granada)

No.	Pos.	Nation	Player
14	MF	MTQ	Mickaël Malsa
16	MF	ESP	César de la Hoz
17	MF	CRO	Stipe Biuk (on loan from Los Angeles FC)
18	DF	ESP	Sergio Escudero
19	FW	SEN	Amath Ndiaye (on loan from Mallorca)
20	MF	CRO	Stanko Jurić (on loan from Parma)
21	FW	ESP	Álvaro Negredo
22	DF	BRA	Lucas Rosa
23	MF	MAR	Anuar
24	MF	BRA	Kenedy
29	DF	ESP	Iván Garriel
34	DF	ESP	César Tárrega (on loan from Valencia)

=== Reserve team ===
Note: Flags indicate national team as defined under FIFA eligibility rules; some limited exceptions apply. Players may hold more than one non-FIFA nationality.

No.	Pos.	Nation	Player
26	MF	ESP	Alberto Quintana
27	MF	ESP	Manuel Pozo
28	MF	ESP	Chuki
31	GK	ESP	Arnau Rafús

No.	Pos.	Nation	Player
35	FW	CMR	Iván Cédric
37	MF	GHA	Eugene Frimpong
38	FW	ESP	Israel Salazar
39	FW	ESP	Adrián Arnu

=== Out on loan ===
Note: Flags indicate national team as defined under FIFA eligibility rules; some limited exceptions apply. Players may hold more than one non-FIFA nationality.

No.	Pos.	Nation	Player
—	GK	ESP	Álvaro Aceves (at Eldense until 30 June 2024)
—	DF	ESP	Álvaro Domínguez (at Coria until 30 June 2024)
—	DF	ESP	Víctor Rofino (at Murcia until 30 June 2024)
—	MF	ESP	Kike Pérez (at Rayo Vallecano until 30 June 2024)
—	MF	MAR	Selim Amallah (at Valencia until 30 June 2024)

No.	Pos.	Nation	Player
—	MF	ESP	Mario Maroto (at Atlético Madrid B until 30 June 2024)
—	MF	NGR	Tunde Akinsola (at AVS until 30 June 2024)
—	FW	VEN	Darwin Machís (at Cádiz until 30 June 2024)
—	FW	ESP	Roberto Arroyo (at Ibiza until 30 June 2024)
—	FW	BUL	Slavy (at Unionistas until 30 June 2024)

== Transfers ==
=== In ===
Pos.	Player	Transferred from	Fee	Date	Source
FW	(Canada) Cyle Larin	(Belgium) Club Brugge	€1,500,000	1 July 2023	
DF	(Cameroon) Flavien Enzo Boyomo	(Spain) Albacete	€1,200,000	7 July 2023	
DF	(Brazil) Gustavo Henrique	(Turkey) Fenerbahçe	€1,200,000	22 August 2023	
FW	(Brazil) Marcos André	(Spain) Valencia	€2,000,000	29 August 2023	
FW	(Spain) Álvaro Negredo	Unattached	Free	8 February 2024	

=== Out ===
Pos.	Player	Transferred to	Fee	Date	Source
MF	(Ecuador) Gonzalo Plata	(Qatar) Al-Sadd	€12,000,000	23 July 2023	
FW	(Canada) Cyle Larin	(Spain) Mallorca	€7,500,000	3 August 2023	
DF	(Uruguay) Lucas Olaza	(Russia) Krasnodar	€2,000,000	6 August 2023	
DF	(Spain) Iván Fresneda	(Portugal) Sporting CP	€9,000,000	30 August 2023	
MF	(Spain) Hugo Vallejo	(Spain) Huesca	Free	1 September 2023	
FW	(Spain) Sergio León	(Spain) Elche	Undisclosed	1 September 2023	

== Pre-season and friendlies ==
Win Draw Loss

== Competitions ==
=== Overall record ===
Competition	First match	Last match	Starting round	Final position	Record							
Competition	First match	Last match	Starting round	Final position	Pld	W	D	L	GF	GA	GD	Win %
Segunda División	11 August 2023	2 June 2024	Matchday 1	2nd	42	21	9	12	51	36	+15	50.00
Copa del Rey	1 November 2023	5 December 2023	First round	Second round	2	1	0	1	6	4	+2	50.00
Total					44	22	9	13	57	40	+17	50.00

Source: Soccerway

=== Segunda División ===
==== League table ====
Pos	Team	Pld	W	D	L	GF	GA	GD	Pts	Qualification or relegation
1	Leganés (C, P)	42	20	14	8	56	27	+29	74	Promotion to La Liga
2	Valladolid (P)	42	21	9	12	51	36	+15	72	Promotion to La Liga
3	Eibar	42	21	8	13	72	48	+24	71	Qualification for promotion play-offs
4	Espanyol (O, P)	42	17	18	7	59	40	+19	69	Qualification for promotion play-offs
5	Sporting Gijón	42	18	11	13	51	42	+9	65	Qualification for promotion play-offs

Updated to match(es) played on 2 Jun 2024. Source: LaLiga HyperMotion
Rules for classification: 1) Points; 2) Head-to-head points; 3) Head-to-head goal difference; 4) Goal difference; 5) Goals scored; 6) Fair-play points
(Note: Head-to-head record is used only after all the matches between the teams in question have been played)
(C) Champions; (O) Play-off winners; (P) Promoted

==== Results summary ====
Overall								Home						Away					
Pld	W	D	L	GF	GA	GD	Pts	W	D	L	GF	GA	GD	W	D	L	GF	GA	GD
42	21	9	12	51	36	+15	72	14	5	2	33	12	+21	7	4	10	18	24	−6

Source: LALIGA HYPERMOTION

==== Results by round ====
Round	1	2	3	4	5	6	7	8	9	10	11	12	13	14	15	16	17	18	19	20	21	22	23	24
Ground	H	A	H	A	H	H	A	H	A	H	A	H	A	H	A	H	A	A	H	A	H	A	A	H
Result	W	L	L	L	D	W	W	W	W	W	L	W	L	W	W	D	W	L	W	L	L			
Position	3	10	16	20	18	16	10	7	7	6	7	6	7	4	3	4	4	4	4	4	4			

Updated to match(es) played on 21 December 2023. Source: LALIGA HYPERMOTION
A = Away; H = Home; W = Win; D = Draw; L = Loss

==== Matches ====
The league fixtures were unveiled on 28 June 2023.

11 August 2023 1	Valladolid	2–0	Sporting Gijón	Valladolid
21:30 CEST (UTC+2)	Cédric 20'; Monchu 53'	Report		Stadium: Estadio José Zorrilla; Attendance: 16,912; Referee: Jon Ander González Esteban

18 August 2023 2	Zaragoza	1–0	Valladolid	Zaragoza
21:30 CEST (UTC+2)	Francés 31'	Report		Stadium: La Romareda; Attendance: 21,023; Referee: Rubén Ávalos Barrera

26 August 2023 3	Valladolid	0–2	Alcorcón	Valladolid
19:30 CEST (UTC+2)	Meseguer (yellow card) 49'	Report	Eteki (yellow card) 23'; González 35'; Obieta (yellow card) 38'; Artola (yellow card) 69'; Morillas (yellow card) 79'; Sousa 90+4'	Stadium: Estadio José Zorrilla; Referee: Andrés Fuentes Molina

1 September 2023 4	Albacete	2–0	Valladolid	Albacete
21:30 CEST (UTC+2)	Djetei 17'; Medina 61'	Report		Stadium: Carlos Belmonte; Attendance: 11,453; Referee: José Luis Guzmán Mansilla

10 September 2023 5	Valladolid	1–1	Elche	Valladolid
21:00 CEST (UTC+2)	Gustavo Henrique 53'	Report	León 53'	Stadium: Estadio José Zorrilla; Attendance: 16,768; Referee: Alejandro Quintero González

16 September 2023 6	Valladolid	1–0	Cartagena	Valladolid
18:30 CEST (UTC+2)	Cédric 90'	Report		Stadium: Estadio José Zorrilla; Attendance: 16,138; Referee: Raúl Martín González Francés

24 September 2023 7	Oviedo	0–1	Valladolid	Oviedo
16:15 CEST (UTC+2)		Report	Marcos André 90+2'	Stadium: Estadio Carlos Tartiere; Attendance: 16,955; Referee: Jon Ander González Esteban

1 October 2023 8	Valladolid	3–0	Burgos	Valladolid
18:30 CEST (UTC+2)	Marcos André 6'; Monchu 41'; Meseguer 68'; Escudero (yellow card) 71'; Rosa (yellow card) 74'	Report	Ojeda (yellow card) 53'; Miki (yellow card) 69'	Stadium: Estadio José Zorrilla; Attendance: 20,493; Referee: José Antonio López Toca

4 October 2023 9	Eldense	0–1	Valladolid	Elda
19:00 CEST (UTC+2)		Report	Sylla 25'	Stadium: Nuevo Pepico Amat; Referee: Miguel Sesma Espinosa

8 October 2023 10	Valladolid	3–2	Mirandés	Valladolid
16:15 CEST (UTC+2)	Sergio Escudero (yellow card) 40' (goal) 90+9'; Sylla 83' 87'; Joni Montiel (yellow card) 86'; Jurić (yellow card) 90'	Report	Barbu (yellow card) 41'; Durdov 51'; Gabri Martínez 90+1' (yellow card) 90+2'; Ramón Juan (yellow card) 90+10'	Stadium: Estadio José Zorrilla; Attendance: 18,473; Referee: (Spain) Salvador Lax Franco

14 October 2023 11	Espanyol	2–0	Valladolid	Cornellà de Llobregat
21:00 CEST (UTC+2)	Braithwaite 8' (pen.); El Hilali (yellow card) 26'; Javi Puado 35'; Nico Melamed (yellow card) 46'; José Gragera (yellow card) 64'	Report	John (yellow card) 5'; Gustavo Henrique (yellow card) 18'; Joni Montiel (yellow card) 87'	Stadium: Stage Front Stadium; Attendance: 21,439; Referee: (Spain) Iván Caparrós Hernández

22 October 2023 12	Valladolid	2–0	FC Andorra	Valladolid
21:00 CEST (UTC+2)	Joni Montiel 8'; Luis Pérez (yellow card) 33'; Jurić 42' (yellow card) 56'; Boyomo (yellow card) 50'; Sylla (yellow card) 53'; John (yellow card) 90+1'	Report	Rubén Bover (yellow card) 45'; Diego González (yellow card) 58'	Stadium: Estadio José Zorrilla; Attendance: 14,753; Referee: (Spain) Manuel Orellana Cid

27 October 2023 13	Eibar	5–1	Valladolid	Eibar
21:00 CEST (UTC+2)	Ager Aketxe 22'; Jon Bautista 32' (yellow card) 81'; Stoichkov 69'; Qasmi 84'; Rahmani 90+7'	Report	Sylla 48'	Stadium: Ipurua Municipal Stadium; Attendance: 5,690; Referee: (Spain) Dámaso Arcediano Monescillo

4 November 2023 14	Valladolid	2–0	Tenerife	Valladolid
18:30 CET (UTC+2)	Monchu 64' (yellow card) 84'; Lucas Rosa 90+2'	Report	Bodiger (yellow card) 30'; Sergio González (yellow card) 31'; Aitor Sanz (yellow card) 72'	Stadium: Estadio José Zorrilla; Attendance: 16,409; Referee: (Spain) Jon González Esteban

11 November 2023 15	Racing de Santander	2–3	Valladolid	Santander
16:15 CET (UTC+2)	Juan Carlos Arana 50' 70'	Report	Tuhami 27'; Sergio Escudero (yellow card) 55'; Kenedy 73' 90+2' (yellow card) 90+3'	Stadium: Campos de Sport de El Sardinero; Attendance: 16,095; Referee: (Spain) Daniel Trujillo Suárez

17 November 2023 16	Valladolid	1–1	Leganés	Valladolid
21:00 CET (UTC+2)	Sylla 26'; Raúl Moro (yellow card) 55'	Report	Sergio González (yellow card) 31' (goal) 51'; Iker Undabarrena (yellow card) 45+3'; Jorge Miramón (yellow card) 55'	Stadium: Estadio José Zorrilla; Attendance: 19,914; Referee: (Spain) José López Toca

24 November 2023 17	Huesca	0–1	Valladolid	Huesca
21:00 CET (UTC+2)	Javi Mier (yellow card) 45+1'; Gerard Valentín (yellow card) 54'; Álvaro Fernández (yellow card) 79'; Juanjo Nieto (yellow card) 90+2'	Report	Luis Pérez (yellow card) 29'; Monchu 57'; Raúl Moro (yellow card) 63'; Lucas Rosa (yellow card) 64'; David Torres (yellow card) 75'	Stadium: Estadio El Alcoraz; Attendance: 5,214; Referee: (Spain) Saúl Ais Reig

2 December 2023 18	Levante	2–1	Valladolid	Valencia
21:00 CET (UTC+2)	Dani Gómez 3' (yellow card) 45+7'; Álex Muñoz (yellow card) 20'; Pablo Martínez 45+4'; Kochorashvili (yellow card) 90+4'; Bouldini (yellow card) 90+6'	Report	Sylla 8'; Monchu (yellow card) 45+1'; Tuhami (yellow card) 45+1'; Iván Sánchez (yellow card) 68'	Stadium: Estadi Ciutat de València; Attendance: 12,978; Referee: (Spain) José Luis Guzmán Mansilla

9 December 2023 19	Valladolid	2–1	Amorebieta	Valladolid
16:15 CET (UTC+2)	Jurić 54'; Israel Salazar 86'; Sergio Escudero (yellow card) 90+4'	Report	Álvaro Núñez (yellow card) 4'; Josep Gayá (yellow card) 17'; Manu Hernando 37'; Jorge Mier (yellow card) 82'	Stadium: Estadio José Zorrilla; Attendance: 15,467; Referee: (Spain) Rafael Sánchez López

18 December 2023 20	Villarreal B	1–0	Valladolid	Villarreal
20:30 CET (UTC+2)	Álex Forés 22'; Carlos Romero (yellow card) 38'	Report	Israel Salazar (yellow card) 57'; Raúl Moro (yellow card) 61'; Jurić (yellow card) 61'; Tuhami (yellow card) 64'	Stadium: Estadio de la Cerámica; Attendance: 1,196; Referee: (Spain) Raúl González Francés

21 December 2023 21	Valladolid	0–1	Racing de Ferrol	Valladolid
21:30 CET (UTC+2)	Israel Salazar (yellow card) 45+7'	Report	Jon García (yellow card) 23'; Álvaro Giménez 39'; Héber Pena (yellow card) 45+3'; Nacho (yellow card) 90+5'	Stadium: Estadio José Zorrilla; Attendance: 13,711; Referee: (Spain) Andrés Fuentes Molina

13 January 2024 22	Burgos	1–0	Valladolid	Burgos
21:00 CET (UTC+2)	Martín 4'			Stadium: Estadio El Plantío; Referee: José Antonio López Toca

21 January 2024 23	Elche	0–0	Valladolid	Elche
21:00 CET (UTC+2)				Stadium: Estadio Martínez Valero; Referee: Salvador Lax Franco

29 January 2024 24	Valladolid	3–1	Racing Santander	Valladolid
20:30 CET (UTC+2)	Tuhami 30'; Meseguer 67', 72'; Boyomo (red card) 74'		Gerard Fernández 59'	Stadium: Estadio José Zorrilla; Referee: Daniel Jesús Trujillo Suárez

23 February 2024 28	Valladolid	3–0	Real Oviedo	Valladolid
20:30 CET (UTC+1)	Monchu 18'; Ndiaye 48', 59'			Stadium: Estadio José Zorrilla; Referee: Rubén Ávalos Barrera

3 March 2024 29	Andorra	v	Valladolid	Andorra la Vella
14:00 CET (UTC+1)				Stadium: Estadi Nacional

31 March 2024 33	Valladolid	v	Levante	Valladolid
				Stadium: Estadio José Zorrilla

2 June 2024 42	Tenerife	v	Valladolid	Santa Cruz de Tenerife
				Stadium: Estadio Heliodoro Rodríguez López

=== Copa del Rey ===
1 November 2023 First round	Peña Deportiva	1–5	Real Valladolid	Santa Eulària des Riu
12:00 CET	Giovanni Navarro (yellow card) 75'; Jaume Tovar 84'	Report	Víctor Meseguer 17' 69' 71'; Alberto Quintana (yellow card) 24' (goal) 78'; Iván Cédric (yellow card) 26'; César de la Hoz 50'; Iván Garriel (yellow card) 59'	Stadium: Estadio Municipal de Santa Eulària des Riu; Attendance: 2,000; Referee: (Spain) Rubén Ávalos Barrera

5 December 2023 Second round	Espanyol	3–1	Real Valladolid	Cornellà de Llobregat
21:00 CET	Jofre Carreras 24' 43'; Bare (yellow card) 90+4'; Javi Puado 90+6'	Report	Akinsola (yellow card) 10'; Israel Salazar 82'; Kenedy (red card) 90+7'; Iván Sánchez (yellow card) 90+8'	Stadium: Stage Front Stadium; Attendance: 15,464; Referee: (Spain) Carlos Grande Rabadán
