= 2024–25 Real Valladolid season =

Real Valladolid
2024–25 season
- President: Ronaldo (until 23 May)
- Head coach: Paulo Pezzolano (until 1 December); Diego Cocca (14 December–17 February); Álvaro Rubio (caretaker, from 17 February)
- Stadium: Estadio José Zorrilla
- La Liga: 20th (relegated)
- Copa del Rey: Round of 32
- Top goalscorer: League: Mamadou Sylla (5); All: Mamadou Sylla (5)
- Highest home attendance: 26,025
- Average home league attendance: 19,829
- Biggest win: Valladolid 1–0 Espanyol
- Biggest defeat: Barcelona 7–0 Valladolid
Home colours	Away colours

The 2024–25 season was the 97th season in the history of Real Valladolid. In addition to the domestic league, the team participated in the Copa del Rey.

== Summary ==
On 29 May, Croatian Stanko Juric's loan from Parma was made permanent, signing a three-season contract. On 31 May, Real Valladolid exercised their purchase option and included Senegalese Amat Ndiaye, tying him to the club until 2027.

== Transfers ==
=== In ===
Pos.	Player	Transferred from	Fee	Date	Source
FW	(Croatia) Stipe Biuk	(United States) Los Angeles FC	€4,000,000	1 July 2024	
GK	(Portugal) André Ferreira	(Spain) Granada	€1,000,000	1 July 2024	
MF	(Croatia) Stanko Jurić	(Italy) Parma	€1,500,000	1 July 2024	
FW	(Senegal) Amath Ndiaye	(Spain) Mallorca	€2,000,000	1 July 2024	
MF	(Spain) Raúl Moro	(Italy) Lazio	€2,000,000	1 July 2024	
DF	(Switzerland) Eray Cömert	(Spain) Valencia	Loan	10 July 2024	

=== Out ===
Pos.	Player	Transferred to	Fee	Date	Source
GK	(Spain) Jordi Masip		End of contract	1 July 2024	
FW	(Spain) Álvaro Negredo		End of contract	1 July 2024	
DF	(Spain) Sergio Escudero	(Spain) Deportivo de La Coruña	End of contract	1 July 2024	
FW	(Croatia) Stipe Biuk	(Croatia) Hajduk Split	Loan	1 September 2024	

== Friendlies ==
27 July 2024 Copa Amistad	Valladolid	1–1 (5–3 p)	Burgos	Palencia
20:00	Pérez 44'		Sancris 51'	Stadium: Estadio La Nueva Balastera; Attendance: 1,500

31 July 2024 Friendly	Valladolid	4–1	Pau FC
20:00

3 August 2024 Friendly	Derby County	2–1	Valladolid	Derby, England
15:00		Report		Stadium: Pride Park Stadium

14 November 2024 Friendly	Valladolid	2–0	AVS
19:00

== Competitions ==
=== Overall record ===
Competition	First match	Last match	Starting round	Final position	Record							
Competition	First match	Last match	Starting round	Final position	Pld	W	D	L	GF	GA	GD	Win %
La Liga	19 August 2024	24 May 2025	Matchday 1	20th	38	4	4	30	26	90	−64	10.53
Copa del Rey	29 October 2024	5 January 2025	First Round	Round of 32	3	2	0	1	10	6	+4	66.67
Total					41	6	4	31	36	96	−60	14.63

Source: Soccerway

=== La Liga ===
==== League table ====
Pos	Team	Pld	W	D	L	GF	GA	GD	Pts	Qualification or relegation
16	Girona	38	11	8	19	44	60	−16	41 (Note: Girona finished ahead of Sevilla on head-to-head goal difference: Sevilla 0–2 Girona, Girona 1–2 Sevilla.)	
17	Sevilla	38	10	11	17	42	55	−13	41	
18	Leganés (R)	38	9	13	16	39	56	−17	40	Relegation to Segunda División
19	Las Palmas (R)	38	8	8	22	40	61	−21	32	Relegation to Segunda División
20	Valladolid (R)	38	4	4	30	26	90	−64	16	Relegation to Segunda División

Source: LaLiga EA Sports
Rules for classification: 1) Points; 2) Head-to-head points; 3) Head-to-head goal difference; 4) Goal difference; 5) Goals scored; 6) Fair-play points
(Note: Head-to-head record is used only after all the matches between the teams in question have been played)
(R) Relegated

==== Results summary ====
Overall								Home						Away					
Pld	W	D	L	GF	GA	GD	Pts	W	D	L	GF	GA	GD	W	D	L	GF	GA	GD
38	4	4	30	26	90	−64	16	3	4	12	11	32	−21	1	0	18	15	58	−43

==== Results by round ====
Round	1	2	3	4	5	6	7	8	9	10	11	12	13	14	15	16	17	18	19	20	21	22	23	24	25	26	27	28	29	30	31	32	33	34	35	36	37	38
Ground	H	A	H	A	A	H	A	H	H	A	H	A	H	A	H	A	H	A	H	A	H	A	A	H	A	H	A	H	A	H	A	H	A	H	A	H	H	A
Result	W	L	D	L	L	D	L	L	L	W	L	L	D	L	L	L	W	L	W	L	L	L	L	L	L	D	L	L	L	L	L	L	L	L	L	L	L	L
Position	4	10	12	16	17	17	18	19	19	18	19	19	19	20	20	20	19	20	19	20	20	20	20	20	20	20	20	20	20	20	20	20	20	20	20	20	20	20

Updated to match(es) played on 25 April 2025. Source:
A = Away; H = Home; W = Win; D = Draw; L = Loss

==== Matches ====
The league schedule was released on 18 June 2024.

19 August 2024 1	Valladolid	1–0	Espanyol	Valladolid
19:00 CEST (UTC+2)	Moro 23'	Report		Stadium: Estadio José Zorrilla; Attendance: 22,027; Referee: Pablo González Fuertes

25 August 2024 2	Real Madrid	3–0	Valladolid	Madrid
17:00 CEST (UTC+2)	Valverde 50'; Brahim 88'; Endrick 90+6'	Report		Stadium: Santiago Bernabéu; Attendance: 70,178; Referee: Víctor García Verdura

28 August 2024 3	Valladolid	0–0	Leganés	Valladolid
19:00 CEST (UTC+2)		Report		Stadium: Estadio José Zorrilla; Attendance: 21,764; Referee: Alejandro Quintero González

31 August 2024 4	Barcelona	7–0	Valladolid	Barcelona
17:00 CEST (UTC+2)	Raphinha 20', 64', 72'; Lewandowski 24'; Koundé 45+2'; Olmo 82'; Torres 85'	Report		Stadium: Estadi Olímpic Lluís Companys; Attendance: 44,359; Referee: Isidro Díaz de Mera Escuderos

15 September 2024 5	Celta Vigo	3–1	Valladolid	Vigo
15:00 CEST (UTC+2)	Antúnez 22'; Quintas 35'; Douvikas 90+1'	Report	Moro 50'	Stadium: Balaídos; Attendance: 21,670; Referee: Francisco José Hernández Maeso

21 September 2024 6	Valladolid	0–0	Real Sociedad	Valladolid
12:00 CEST (UTC+2)		Report		Stadium: Estadio José Zorrilla; Attendance: 21,171; Referee: Guillermo Cuadra Fernández

24 September 2024 7	Sevilla	2–1	Valladolid	Seville
19:00 CEST (UTC+2)	Torres 45' (o.g.); Ejuke 85'	Report	Pérez 56'	Stadium: Ramón Sánchez Pizjuán; Attendance: 35,292; Referee: Juan Luis Pulido Santana

27 September 2024 8	Valladolid	1–2	Mallorca	Valladolid
	I. Sánchez 90+4'	Report	Larin 59'; Valery 83'	Stadium: Estadio José Zorrilla; Attendance: 20,338; Referee: José Luis Munuera Montero

5 October 2024 9	Valladolid	1–2	Rayo Vallecano	Valladolid
	Amallah 51'	Report	de Frutos 57', 80'	Stadium: Estadio José Zorrilla; Attendance: 21,112; Referee: Pablo González Fuertes

18 October 2024 10	Alavés	2–3	Valladolid	Vitoria-Gasteiz
	Martínez 6'; Kike 90+7'	Report	Sylla 17' (pen.); Amallah 72' (pen.); Anuar 76'	Stadium: Mendizorrotza; Attendance: 16,904; Referee: Mario Melero López

26 October 2024 11	Valladolid	1–2	Villarreal	Valladolid
	Sylla 60' (pen.)	Report	Barry 29'; Pérez 84'	Stadium: Estadio José Zorrilla; Attendance: 20,178; Referee: Francisco José Hernández Maeso

2 November 2024 12	Osasuna	1–0	Valladolid	Pamplona
	Budimir 19'	Report		Stadium: El Sadar; Attendance: 20,430; Referee: Víctor García Verdura

10 November 2024 13	Valladolid	1–1	Athletic Bilbao	Valladolid
	Moro 79'	Report	Guruzeta 90+4'	Stadium: Estadio José Zorrilla; Attendance: 23,515; Referee: Adrián Cordero Vega

22 November 2024 14	Getafe	2–0	Valladolid	Getafe
	Rodríguez 70'; Nyom 73'	Report		Stadium: Coliseum; Attendance: 9,911; Referee: Pablo González Fuertes

30 November 2024 15	Valladolid	0–5	Atlético Madrid	Valladolid
21:00 CET (UTC+1)	Pérez (yellow card) 32'	Report	Lenglet 26'; Alvarez 35'; De Paul 37'; Galán (yellow card) 41'; Griezmann 52'; Simeone (yellow card) 75'; Sørloth 90+2'	Stadium: Estadio José Zorrilla; Attendance: 23,482; Referee: Guillermo Cuadra Fernández

8 December 2024 16	Las Palmas	2–1	Valladolid	Las Palmas
	Sandro 20', 64'; Fábio Silva (yellow card) 26'; A.Suárez (yellow card) 76'; McKenna (yellow card) 80'; Marvin (yellow card) 90+8'	Report	Marcos André 45'; Cömert (yellow card) 49'; V.Meseguer (yellow card) 78'; A.Ndiaye (yellow card) 90+9'	Stadium: Estadio Gran Canaria

13 December 2024 17	Valladolid	1–0	Valencia	Valladolid
21:00 CET (UTC+1)	Anuar 20', (yellow card) 90+6'; Kike Pérez (yellow card) 55'; Marcos André (yellow card) 67'; Latasa (red card) 78'; Sánchez (yellow card) 82'	Report	Vázquez (yellow card) 28'; Mir (yellow card) 86'; Canós (yellow card) 90+8'	Stadium: Estadio José Zorrilla; Attendance: 18,449; Referee: Miguel Ángel Ortiz Arias

22 December 2024 18	Girona	3–0	Valladolid	Girona
21:00 CET (UTC+1)	Ruiz (yellow card) 24', (goal) 39'; D. López 31'; Gutiérrez (yellow card) 54'; Martín (yellow card) 60'; Danjuma 81'	Report	Sánchez (yellow card) 30'	Stadium: Montilivi; Attendance: 9,534; Referee: Pablo González Fuertes

12 January 2025 19	Valladolid	1–0	Real Betis	Valladolid
16:15 CET (UTC+1)	Marcos André (yellow card) 42'; K. Pérez 58', (yellow card) 71'	Report	Llorente (yellow card) 26'; Lo Celso (yellow card) 70'; Cardoso (yellow card) 77'; Vitor Roque (yellow card) 90+12'	Stadium: José Zorrilla; Attendance: 21,911; Referee: Adrián Cordero Vega

19 January 2025 20	Espanyol	2–1	Valladolid	Barcelona
21:00 CET (UTC+1)	Puado 31'; El Hilali (yellow card) 45'; Roberto 74'; B.Oliván (yellow card) 90+1'	Report	J.Sánchez 57'; Jurić (yellow card) 63'; Amallah (yellow card) 81'	Stadium: Stage Front Stadium; Attendance: 23,554; Referee: Ricardo De Burgos Bengoetxea

25 January 2025 21	Valladolid	0–3	Real Madrid	Valladolid
21:00 UTC+1	Martín (yellow card) 15' (yellow-red card) 90'; Amallah (yellow card) 45+2'	Report	Mbappé 30', 57', 90+1' (pen.) (yellow card) 55'; Bellingham (yellow card) 45+2'; Ceballos (yellow card) 47'	Stadium: Estadio José Zorrilla; Attendance: 26,025; Referee: Mateo Busquets Ferrer

2 February 2025 22	Villarreal	5–1	Valladolid	Villarreal
16:15 CET (UTC+1)	Foyth (yellow card) 30'; Ayoze Pérez 42'; Gueye 64'; Santi Comesaña 70'; Barry 86'; Denis Suárez 90+1'	Report	L.Rosa (yellow card) 36'; Amallah (yellow card) 66', (goal) 90+4'	Stadium: Estadio de la Cerámica; Attendance: 17,032; Referee: Isidro Díaz de Mera Escuderos

9 February 2025 23	Rayo Vallecano	1–0	Valladolid	Madrid
21:00	Pathé Ciss (yellow card) 13'; de Frutos (yellow card) 56'; Álvaro 71'	Report	André (yellow card) 29'; Aznou (yellow card) 69'	Stadium: Vallecas; Attendance: 12.286; Referee: Jesús Gil Manzano

16 February 2025 24	Valladolid	0–4	Sevilla	Valladolid
16:15 CET (UTC+1)	Nikitscher (yellow card) 51'; Anuar (yellow card) 72'; Amallah (yellow card) 81'; Sylla (yellow card) 90+1'	Report	Juanlu 5', 67'; Romero 45+1', (yellow card) 45+2'; Pedrosa (yellow card) 52'; Lukebakio 84'	Stadium: José Zorrilla; Attendance: 22,123; Referee: Javier Alberola Rojas

23 February 2025 25	Athletic Bilbao	7–1	Valladolid	Bilbao
14:00 CET (UTC+1)	Jauregizar 10'; N. Williams 35', 66'; Sannadi 43'; Sancet 45+2'; Guruzeta 69'; Vivian (yellow card) 79'; Ruiz de Galarreta (yellow card) 84'; I. Williams 87'	Report	Martín (yellow card) 44'; Sylla 47'; Jurić (yellow card) 46' (yellow-red card) 56'	Stadium: San Mamés; Attendance: 47,715; Referee: César Soto Grado

28 February 2025 26	Valladolid	1–1	Las Palmas	Valladolid
21:00	Nikitscher (yellow card) 50'; Latasa 63'; Martín (yellow card) 70'	Report	Sandro 22'; McKenna (red card) 29'; Moleiro (yellow card) 45+6'	Stadium: José Zorrilla; Attendance: 15.643; Referee: De Burgos Bengoetxea

8 March 2025 27	Valencia	2–1	Valladolid	Valencia
18:30	López 7'; Sadiq 58'; Gayà (yellow card) 84'	Report	Grillitsch (yellow card) 8'; Latasa 40', (yellow card) 66'; Javi (yellow card) 87'	Stadium: Mestalla; Attendance: 41.720; Referee: Juan Pulido Santana

15 March 2025 28	Valladolid	0–1	Celta Vigo	Valladolid
14:00	Moro (yellow card) 82'; Sylla (yellow card) 90+1'	Report	Alonso (yellow card) 37', (goal) 83' (pen.); Alfon (yellow card) 56'; Mingueza (yellow card) 65'	Stadium: José Zorrilla; Attendance: 17.521; Referee: Víctor García Verdura

29 March 2025 29	Real Sociedad	2–1	Valladolid	San Sebastián
14:00 CET (UTC+1)	Oyarzabal 23'; Marín (yellow card) 58'; Gómez 68', (yellow card) 90+7'	Report	Sánchez (yellow card) 48'; Amallah (yellow card) 51'; Torres (yellow card) 68'; Latasa 90+3'	Stadium: Reale Arena; Attendance: 28,151; Referee: Adrián Cordero Vega

6 April 2025 30	Valladolid	0–4	Getafe	Valladolid
18:30	Latasa (yellow card) 9'; Cömert (yellow card) 14'; Martín (red card) 45+2'; Sylla (yellow card) 71'	Report	Arambarri 1'; Terrats 19', 38'; Iglesias (yellow card) 58'; Duarte 80'	Stadium: José Zorrilla; Attendance: 17.737; Referee: Alejandro Quintero González

14 April 2025 31	Atlético Madrid	4–2	Valladolid	Madrid
21:00	Alvarez 25' (pen.), 71' (pen.); G.Simeone 27'; Lenglet (yellow card) 55'; Sørloth 79'	Report	Sylla 21' (pen.); Javi 56'; Anuar (yellow card) 63'	Stadium: Cívitas Metropolitano; Attendance: 55.936; Referee: Isidro Díaz de Mera

20 April 2025 32	Valladolid	2–3	Osasuna	Valladolid
14:00	Moro 49'; Sylla 66' (pen.); Javi (yellow card) 79'; Aznou (yellow card) 90+1'	Report	Budimir 9', 60' (pen.); García 34'	Stadium: José Zorrilla; Attendance: 12.230; Referee: Jesús Gil Manzano

24 April 2025 33	Real Betis	5–1	Valladolid	Seville
21:30	J.Rodríguez 17'; Cucho 64'; Isco 66'; Ruibal (yellow card) 72'; Perraud 84'; Ezzalzouli 90'	Report	Chuki 41'	Stadium: Benito Villamarín; Attendance: 46.458; Referee: Francisco Hernández Maeso

4 May 2025 34	Valladolid	1–2	Barcelona	Valladolid
20:00	I. Sánchez 6'; Sylla (yellow card) 8'; Anuar (yellow card) 37'; Martín (yellow card) 90'	Report	Raphinha 54'; Fermín 60'; Christensen (yellow card) 66'; Araújo (yellow card) 83'	Stadium: José Zorrilla; Attendance: 23,967; Referee: Alejandro Muñiz Ruiz

11 May 2025 35	Mallorca	2–1	Valladolid	Palma
17:30	Mascarell 28'; Raíllo (yellow card) 34'; Darder 49'; Lato (yellow card) 90+2'	Report	Chuki 11'; Özkacar (yellow card) 13'	Stadium: Visit Mallorca Estadi; Attendance: 16,018; Referee: Juan Luis Pulido Santana

14 May 2025 36	Valladolid	0–1	Girona	Valladolid
18:00		Report	Stuani 80'	Stadium: José Zorrilla; Attendance: 12,664; Referee: Alejandro Quintero González

18 May 2025 37	Valladolid	0–1	Alavés	Valladolid
18:00		Report	Kike 18'; Vincente (yellow card) 90'; Conechny (yellow card) 90+3'	Stadium: José Zorrilla; Attendance: 14,506; Referee: Isidro Díaz de Mera Escuderos

25 May 2025 38	Leganés	3–0	Valladolid	Leganés
17:30	Javi 24'; Diomande 36'; Cruz 40'	Report	Candela (yellow card) 13'	Stadium: Municipal de Butarque; Attendance: 11,523; Referee: César Soto Grado

=== Copa del Rey ===
29 October 2024 First round	Astur	1–4	Valladolid	Oviedo
21:00	Robi Toral 56'	Report	Latasa 7', 28'; Kike Pérez 59'; Meseguer (penalty missed) 62', 90+2'	Stadium: Hermanos Llana; Referee: Alejandro Muñiz Ruiz

3 December 2024 Second round	Ávila	2–4 (a.e.t.)	Valladolid	Ávila
19:00	Sissé (yellow card) 16'; Doumbia (yellow card) 24'; Miguel de la Fuente (yellow card) 31'; Adri Carrión 49', 54'; Jorge Campos (yellow card) 51'; Carlos Pascual (yellow card) 98'; Adilson (yellow card) 117'	Report	Latasa 15', (yellow card) 66'; Lucas Rosa (yellow card) 52'; Marcos André 73', 111'; Amath Ndiaye (yellow card) 76'; Juma Bah (yellow card) 110'; Kike Pérez 119'	Stadium: Adolfo Suárez; Referee: Alejandro Quintero González

5 January 2025 Round of 32	Ourense CF	3–2	Valladolid	Ourense
18:00	J.Noriega 17'; J.Ramos 32'; Sánchez 52'; Fidalgo (yellow card) 65'	Report	Amath Ndiaye (yellow card) 13'; Moro 15'; Amallah 24'; Anuar (yellow card) 65'; Kike Pérez (yellow card) 67'; Martín (yellow card) 90+4'	Stadium: O Couto; Referee: Francisco José Hernández Maeso
