= Chuki (footballer) =

Spanish footballer (born 2004)

Personal information
- Full name: Iván San José Cantalejo
- Date of birth: 29 April 2004 (age 22)
- Place of birth: Valladolid, Spain
- Height: 1.76 m (5 ft 9 in)
- Position: Attacking midfielder

Team information
- Current team: Werder Bremen
- Number: 20

Youth career
- Victoria Valladolid
- Valladolid

Senior career*
Years	Team	Apps	(Gls)
2022–2024	Valladolid B	63	(16)
2023–2026	Valladolid	52	(9)
2026–	Werder Bremen	8	(0)

International career
2021	Spain U18	2	(1)
- * Club domestic league appearances and goals as of 31 October 2026

Iván San José Cantalejo (born 29 April 2004), commonly known as Chuki, is a Spanish professional footballer who plays for Bundesliga club Werder Bremen. Mainly an attacking midfielder, he can also play as a winger.

== Club career ==
=== Valladolid ===
Born in Valladolid, Castile and León, Chuki joined Real Valladolid's youth sides from CD Victoria CF. He made his senior debut with the reserves on 28 August 2021, starting in a 1–1 Primera División RFEF away draw against SD Logroñés.

Chuki scored his first senior goal on 20 November 2021, netting the B's equalizer in a 2–2 home draw against Internacional de Madrid. The following 15 July, he renewed his contract with the club until 2025.

Chuki made his first team debut on 1 November 2023, coming on as a late substitute for fellow youth graduate David Torres in a 5–1 away routing of Peña Deportiva, for the season's Copa del Rey. He made his professional – and La Liga – debut on 19 August of the following year, replacing Kike Pérez late into a 1–0 home win over Espanyol.

Chuki scored his first professional goal on 24 April 2025, but in a 5–1 away loss to Real Betis. A regular starter during the 2025–26 Segunda División, he was the club's top scorer with seven goals (along with Juanmi Latasa) as the club only avoided a second consecutive relegation.

=== Werder Bremen ===
On 2 June 2026, Bundesliga club Werder Bremen confirmed the signing of Chuki on a four-year contract, effective as of 1 July.

== International career ==
Chuki was called up to the Spain national under-18 team on 21 January 2022, scoring a goal against Denmark on 23 February.

== Career statistics ==
As of match played 31 October 2026

Appearances and goals by club, season and competition
Club	Season	League			National cup		Europe		Other		Total	
Club	Season	Division	Apps	Goals	Apps	Goals	Apps	Goals	Apps	Goals	Apps	Goals
Valladolid B	2021–22	Primera Federación	13	1	—		—		—		13	1
Valladolid B	2022–23	Segunda Federación	26	8	—		—		2 (Note: Appearances in 2023 Segunda Federación play-offs)	0	28	8
Valladolid B	2023–24	Segunda Federación	24	7	—		—		—		24	7
Valladolid B	Total		63	16	—		—		2	0	65	16
Valladolid	2023–24	Segunda División	0	0	1	0	—		—		1	0
Valladolid	2024–25	La Liga	18	2	1	0	—		—		19	2
Valladolid	2025–26	Segunda División	34	7	1	0	—		—		35	7
Valladolid	Total		52	9	3	0	—		—		55	9
Werder Bremen	2026–27	Bundesliga	8	0	2	0	—		—		10	0
Career total			123	25	5	0	0	0	2	0	130	25
