= 2022–23 Real Valladolid season =

Real Valladolid
2022–23 season
- President: Ronaldo
- Head coach: Pacheta (until 3 April); Paulo Pezzolano (from 4 April)
- Stadium: José Zorrilla
- La Liga: 18th (relegated)
- Copa del Rey: Round of 32
- Top goalscorer: League: Cyle Larin (8); All: Cyle Larin; Sergio León (8 each)
- Average home league attendance: 20,052
- Biggest win: Arenas Getxo 1–5 Valladolid
- Biggest defeat: Real Madrid 6–0 Valladolid
Home colours	Away colours	Third colours

The 2022–23 season was the 95th in the history of Real Valladolid and their first season back in the top flight. The club participated in La Liga and the Copa del Rey.

On 4 June 2023, Real Valladolid were relegated following a goalless draw against Getafe on the final matchday of the season. Despite their demotion, the club accumulated the highest points total for a relegated team to finish in the danger zone since Villarreal's 41-point campaign in the 2011–12 season.

== Players ==
As of 1 February 2023.

Note: Flags indicate national team as defined under FIFA eligibility rules; some limited exceptions apply. Players may hold more than one non-FIFA nationality.

No.	Pos.	Nation	Player
1	GK	ESP	Jordi Masip (captain)
2	DF	ESP	Luis Pérez
4	MF	ESP	Kike Pérez
5	DF	ESP	Javi Sánchez
6	MF	ESP	Álvaro Aguado
7	FW	ESP	Sergio León
8	MF	ESP	Monchu
9	MF	MAR	Selim Amallah
10	MF	ESP	Óscar Plano
11	MF	ECU	Gonzalo Plata
12	DF	URU	Lucas Olaza
13	GK	ESP	Sergio Asenjo (3rd captain)
14	MF	MTQ	Mickaël Malsa

No.	Pos.	Nation	Player
15	DF	MAR	Jawad El Yamiq
17	MF	ESP	Roque Mesa (vice-captain)
18	DF	ESP	Sergio Escudero
19	MF	BRA	Kenedy
20	MF	CMR	Martin Hongla (on loan from Hellas Verona)
21	MF	ESP	Iván Sánchez
22	FW	VEN	Darwin Machís
23	MF	MAR	Anuar Tuhami
24	DF	ESP	Joaquín
25	FW	CAN	Cyle Larin (on loan from Club Brugge)
27	DF	ESP	Iván Fresneda
39	DF	BRA	Lucas Rosa

== Transfers ==
=== In ===
Date	Player	From	Type	Fee	Ref.
1 July 2022	(Spain) Iván Sánchez	(England) Birmingham City	Transfer	€100k	
7 July 2022	(Spain) Sergio Asenjo	Villarreal	Transfer	Free	
11 July 2022	(Ecuador) Gonzalo Plata	(Portugal) Sporting CP	Buyout clause	Undisclosed	
13 July 2022	(Spain) Sergio Escudero	Granada	Transfer	Free	
1 September 2022	(Brazil) Kenedy	(England) Chelsea	Transfer	Free	
1 September 2022	(Colombia) Juanjo Narváez	Zaragoza	Transfer	Free	
24 January 2023	(Canada) Cyle Larin	(Belgium) Club Brugge	Loan		

=== Out ===
Date	Player	To	Type	Fee	Ref.
1 July 2022	(The Gambia) Saidy Janko	(Germany) VfL Bochum	Loan		
1 July 2022	(Spain) Nacho	Released			
14 July 2022	(Spain) Diego Alende	Andorra	Transfer	Free	
15 July 2022	(Spain) Raúl García	Deportivo La Coruña	Loan		
16 July 2022	(Brazil) Paulo Vitor	(Portugal) Rio Ave	Loan		

== Pre-season and friendlies ==
Win Draw Loss Fixtures

16 July 2022 Friendly	Atlético Tordesillas	0–2	Valladolid	Tordesillas
19:30 CEST (UTC+2)				Stadium: Campo de Las Salinas

22 July 2022 Friendly	Unionistas de Salamanca	1–2	Valladolid	Villares de la Reina
19:30 CEST (UTC+2)	Beneit 75'		Gómez 42' (o.g.); Gassama 51'	Stadium: Helmántico Stadium

23 July 2022 Friendly	Burgos	0–0	Valladolid	Burgos
19:00 CEST (UTC+2)				Stadium: Estadio El Plantío

28 July 2022 Friendly	Ponferradina	1–2	Valladolid	Ponferrada
20:00 CEST (UTC+2)				Stadium: Estadio El Toralín

30 July 2022 Friendly	Brest	0–0	Valladolid	Brest, France
18:00 CEST (UTC+2)				Stadium: Stade Francis-Le Blé

5 August 2022 Friendly	Rayo Vallecano	0–0	Valladolid	Madrid
10:30 CEST (UTC+1)				Stadium: Ciudad del Fútbol de Las Rozas; Attendance: 600; Referee: Jaime Candil

6 August 2022 Trofeo Ciudad de Valladolid	Valladolid	0–0 (4–1 p)	Lazio	Valladolid, Spain
20:00 CEST (UTC+2)	Escudero (yellow card) 31'; Monchu (yellow card) 84'; García (yellow card) 89'		Patric (yellow card) 33'; Cataldi (yellow card) 33'; Pedro (yellow card) 33'; Lazzari (yellow card) 53'; Vecino (yellow card) 82'	Stadium: Estadio José Zorrilla; Attendance: 9,010; Referee: Alejandro Muñiz Ruiz (Spain)
	Penalties
	J. Sánchez (penalty scored); Olaza (penalty scored); I. Sánchez (penalty scored); El Yamiq (penalty scored)		(penalty scored) Zaccagni; (penalty missed) Milinković-Savić; (penalty missed) Vecino

22 September 2022 Friendly	Valladolid	0–2	Osasuna	Burgos
12:00 CEST (UTC+2)			Moncayola 39'; Kike 52'	Stadium: Estadio El Plantío

30 November 2022 Friendly	Valladolid	1–0	Getafe	Palencia
20:00 CET (UTC+1)	Arroyo 27'	Report		Stadium: Estadio Nueva Balastera

6 December 2022 Friendly	Athletic Bilbao	2–0	Valladolid	Miranda de Ebro
12:00 CET (UTC+1)	Guruzeta 27'; Sancet 51'	Report		Stadium: Estadio Municipal de Anduva

10 December 2022 Friendly	Valladolid	0–2	Lille	San Pedro del Pinatar
11:30 CET (UTC+1)		Report	Virginius 25', 59'	Stadium: Pinatar Arena

13 December 2022 Friendly	Valladolid	0–0	Clermont	San Pedro del Pinatar
11:30 CET (UTC+1)		Report		Stadium: Pinatar Arena

16 December 2022 Friendly	Crystal Palace	2–1	Valladolid	London
19:00 GMT (UTC+0)	Wilfried Zaha 56', 75' (pen.); Gordon (yellow card) 88'		León 32'; Monchu (yellow card) 43'; Guardoila (yellow card) 88'	Stadium: Selhurst Park

== Competitions ==
=== Overall record ===
Competition	First match	Last match	Starting round	Final position	Record							
Competition	First match	Last match	Starting round	Final position	Pld	W	D	L	GF	GA	GD	Win %
La Liga	13 August 2022	4 June 2023	Matchday 1	18th	38	11	7	20	33	63	−30	28.95
Copa del Rey	12 November 2022	4 January 2023	First round	Round of 32	3	2	0	1	7	2	+5	66.67
Total					41	13	7	21	40	65	−25	31.71

Source: Soccerway

=== La Liga ===
==== League table ====
Pos	Team	Pld	W	D	L	GF	GA	GD	Pts	Qualification or relegation
16	Valencia	38	11	9	18	42	45	−3	42 (Note: Head-to-head points: Cádiz 8, Getafe 5, Valencia 3.)	
17	Almería	38	11	8	19	49	65	−16	41	
18	Valladolid (R)	38	11	7	20	33	63	−30	40	Relegation to Segunda División
19	Espanyol (R)	38	8	13	17	52	69	−17	37	Relegation to Segunda División
20	Elche (R)	38	5	10	23	30	67	−37	25	Relegation to Segunda División

Source: LaLiga Santander
Rules for classification: 1) Points; 2) Head-to-head points; 3) Head-to-head goal difference; 4) Goal difference; 5) Goals scored; 6) Fair-play points (Note: Head-to-head record is used only after all the matches between the teams in question have been played)
(R) Relegated

==== Results summary ====
Overall								Home						Away					
Pld	W	D	L	GF	GA	GD	Pts	W	D	L	GF	GA	GD	W	D	L	GF	GA	GD
38	11	7	20	33	63	−30	40	8	4	7	21	23	−2	3	3	13	12	40	−28

Source: La Liga

==== Results by round ====
Round	1	2	3	4	5	6	7	8	9	10	11	12	13	14	15	16	17	18	19	20	21	22	23	24	25	26	27	28	29	30	31	32	33	34	35	36	37	38
Ground	H	A	A	H	A	H	A	H	A	H	H	A	H	A	H	A	H	A	H	A	H	A	A	H	A	H	A	H	A	H	A	H	A	H	A	H	A	H
Result	L	D	L	W	L	L	W	D	L	W	W	L	W	L	L	L	L	L	W	W	D	L	L	W	D	L	L	D	W	W	L	L	L	L	L	W	D	D
Position	20	18	19	16	17	18	15	13	17	11	11	11	10	12	15	16	18	18	17	13	13	15	17	14	14	16	16	17	14	14	14	15	16	17	18	18	18	18

Source: La Liga
A = Away; H = Home; W = Win; D = Draw; L = Loss

==== Matches ====
The league fixtures were announced on 23 June 2022.

13 August 2022 1	Valladolid	0–3	Villarreal	Valladolid
19:00 CEST (UTC+2)	Mesa (yellow card) 52'	Report	Jackson 49'; Baena 81', 90'	Stadium: José Zorrilla; Attendance: 17,543; Referee: Mario Melero López

19 August 2022 2	Sevilla	1–1	Valladolid	Seville
22:00 CEST (UTC+2)	Montiel (yellow card) 68'; Rekik 86'; Ocampos (yellow card) 87'; Acuña (red card) 88'; Isco (yellow card) 90+9'	Report	Anuar 80'; Pérez (yellow card) 83'; El Yamiq (red card) 88'; Olaza (yellow card) 90+4'	Stadium: Ramón Sánchez Pizjuán; Attendance: 33,991; Referee: Juan Luis Pulido Santana

28 August 2022 3	Barcelona	4–0	Valladolid	Barcelona
19:30 CEST (UTC+2)	Lewandowski 24', 65'; Pedri 43'; Roberto 90+2'	Report	Monchu (yellow card) 45'; J. Sánchez (yellow card) 78'; Kike (yellow card) 79'	Stadium: Camp Nou; Attendance: 83,792; Referee: Ricardo de Burgos Bengoetxea

5 September 2022 4	Valladolid	1–0	Almería	Valladolid
21:00 CEST (UTC+2)	J. Sánchez (yellow card) 90+2'; Weissman 90+3'	Report	Akieme (yellow card) 14'; De la Hoz (yellow card) 41'; Embarba (yellow card) 77'; Kaiky (yellow card) 80'; Costa (yellow card) 90+1'; Milovanović (yellow card) 90+2'	Stadium: José Zorrilla; Attendance: 20,260; Referee: Pablo González Fuertes

9 September 2022 5	Girona	2–1	Valladolid	Girona
21:00 CEST (UTC+2)	Reinier 21'; Romeu 88'	Report	Anuar (yellow card) 9'; Monchu 38'; Mesa (yellow card) 79'	Stadium: Estadi Montilivi; Attendance: 10,053; Referee: César Soto Grado

16 September 2022 6	Valladolid	0–1	Cádiz	Valladolid
21:00 CEST (UTC+2)	Monchu (yellow card) 18'	Report	Espino (yellow card) 28'; Emeterio (yellow card) 53'; José Mari (yellow card) 75'; Zaldúa (yellow card) 79'; Negredo 90+2'	Stadium: José Zorrilla; Attendance: 20,295; Referee: José María Sánchez Martínez

1 October 2022 7	Getafe	2–3	Valladolid	Getafe
16:15 CEST (UTC+2)	Djené (yellow card) 18'; Mayoral 29'; Suárez 31'; Soria (yellow card) 69'	Report	Kike (yellow card) 11'; Joaquín (yellow card) 14'; León 20' (pen.), 37'; Plano 49'; Aguado (yellow card) 72'; Weissman (yellow card) 73'; Masip (yellow card) 90+4'	Stadium: Coliseum Alfonso Pérez; Attendance: 10,958; Referee: Alejandro Muñiz Ruiz

9 October 2022 8	Valladolid	0–0	Real Betis	Valladolid
14:00 CEST (UTC+2)	Escudero (yellow card) 73'	Report	Pezzella (red card) 35'; Carvalho (yellow card) 90+2'	Stadium: José Zorrilla; Attendance: 22,561; Referee: Carlos del Cerro Grande

16 October 2022 9	Espanyol	1–0	Valladolid	Cornellà de Llobregat
18:30 CEST (UTC+2)	Vinícius (yellow card) 63'; Joselu 78'	Report	Feddal (yellow card) 15'; Escudero (yellow card) 31'; Monchu (yellow card) 52'; Mesa (yellow card) 59'	Stadium: RCDE Stadium; Attendance: 17,770; Referee: Antonio Mateu Lahoz

19 October 2022 10	Valladolid	4–1	Celta Vigo	Valladolid
19:00 CEST (UTC+2)	Mesa 32'; Fernández 62'; León 74', 79' (penalty missed) 78'; Masip (yellow card) 90+2'	Report	Rodriguez (yellow card) 28', (goal) 43'; Aspas (penalty missed) 88'	Stadium: José Zorrilla; Attendance: 16,547; Referee: Valentín Pizarro

22 October 2022 11	Valladolid	1–0	Real Sociedad	Valladolid
16:15 CEST (UTC+2)	J. Sánchez (yellow card) 6'; León 16'; Plano (yellow card) 51'	Report	Zubimendi (yellow card) 27'; Navarro (yellow card) 46'; Méndez (yellow card) 60'	Stadium: José Zorrilla; Attendance: 21,175; Referee: Jorge Figueroa Vázquez

30 October 2022 12	Osasuna	2–0	Valladolid	Osasuna
14:00 CET (UTC+1)	Ávila 13'; Gómez 19'; Torró (yellow card) 47'	Report	Rosa (yellow card) 29'; Mesa (yellow card) 33'; Olaza (yellow card) 45+1'	Stadium: El Sadar Stadium; Attendance: 19,429; Referee: Guillermo Cuadra Fernández

5 November 2022 13	Valladolid	2–1	Elche	Valladolid
16:15 CET (UTC+1)	J. Sánchez 40', (yellow card) 45'; Mesa 46'; Fernández (yellow card) 64'	Report	Josan 63'	Stadium: José Zorrilla; Attendance: 20,176; Referee: Ricardo de Burgos Bengoetxea

8 November 2022 14	Athletic Bilbao	3–0	Valladolid	Bilbao
20:00 CET (UTC+1)	Guruzeta 18', 51', (yellow card) 45+1'; Herrera (yellow card) 49'; Vivian 78'; Vencedor (yellow card) 84'	Report	Monchu (yellow card) 42'	Stadium: San Mamés; Attendance: 40,072; Referee: Isidro Díaz de Mera Escuderos

30 December 2022 15	Valladolid	0–2	Real Madrid	Valladolid
21:30 CET (UTC+1)	J. Sánchez (yellow card) 81'; León (red card) 82'; Joaquín (yellow card) 82'	Report	Benzema 83' (pen.), 89'	Stadium: José Zorrilla; Attendance: 25,950; Referee: José Luis Munuera Montero

7 January 2023 16	Mallorca	1–0	Valladolid	Mallorca
18:30 CET (UTC+1)	Valjent (yellow card) 31'; Copete (yellow card) 61'; Prats 90+4'	Report	Fresneda (yellow card) 61'; Kike (yellow card) 69'; Kenedy (yellow card) 90+3'	Stadium: Estadi Mallorca Son Moix; Attendance: 17,129; Referee: Valentín Pizarro

14 January 2023 17	Valladolid	0–1	Rayo Vallecano	Valladolid
14:00 CET (UTC+1)	Monchu (yellow card) 32'; Guardiola (yellow card) 45+4'	Report	Palazón (penalty missed) 33', 65', (yellow card) 80'; Camello (yellow card) 75'	Stadium: José Zorrilla; Attendance: 19,969; Referee: Mario Melero

21 January 2023 18	Atlético Madrid	3–0	Valladolid	Madrid
18:30 CET (UTC+1)	Morata 18'; Griezmann 23'; Hermoso 28'; Mandava (yellow card) 36'	Report	Kike (yellow card) 38'	Stadium: Cívitas Metropolitano; Attendance: 53,253; Referee: Ricardo de Burgos Bengoetxea

29 January 2023 19	Valladolid	1–0	Valencia	Valladolid
14:00 CET (UTC+1)	J. Sánchez (yellow card) 45+2'; Aguado (yellow card) 56'; Mesa (yellow card) 69'; Larin 90'	Report	Almeida (yellow card) 13'	Stadium: José Zorilla; Attendance: 19,675; Referee: Jorge Figueroa Vázquez

5 February 2023 20	Real Sociedad	0–1	Valladolid	San Sebastián
18:30 CET (UTC+1)	Rico (yellow card) 24'; Barrenetxea (yellow card) 45'; Illarramendi (yellow card) 69'; Fernández (yellow card) 90+5'	Report	J. Sánchez (yellow card) 27'; Olaza (yellow card) 31'; Plano (yellow card) 38'; Hongla (yellow card) 40'; Larin 73', (yellow card) 90+2'	Stadium: Anoeta; Attendance: 32,208; Referee: Pablo González Fuertes

12 February 2023 21	Valladolid	0–0	Osasuna	Valladolid
18:30 CET (UTC+1)	Machís (yellow card) 36'	Report	Cruz (yellow card) 34'; Sánchez (yellow card) 85'; Ávila (yellow card) 88'	Stadium: José Zorilla; Attendance: 21,102; Referee: Guillermo Cuadra Fernández

18 February 2023 22	Real Betis	2–1	Valladolid	Seville
16:15 CET (UTC+1)	Juanmi 2'; Abner (yellow card) 12'; Canales 45+4' (pen.); Rodríguez (yellow card) 77'; González (yellow card) 90'	Report	J. Sánchez (yellow card) 5'; Larin 30'; Monchu (yellow card) 55'; Aguado (yellow card) 55'; Pérez (yellow card) 79'; Hongla (yellow card) 89'	Stadium: Benito Villamarín; Attendance: 51,396; Referee: Antonio Mateu Lahoz

26 February 2023 23	Celta Vigo	3–0	Valladolid	Vigo
16:15 CET (UTC+1)	Seferovic 17'; Veiga 32', 64'; Óscar (yellow card) 66'	Report	Monchu (yellow card) 30'; Kike (yellow card) 38'; J. Sánchez (yellow card) 79'; Amallah (red card) 84'	Stadium: Balaídos; Attendance: 14,755; Referee: Ricardo De Burgos Bengoetxea

5 March 2023 24	Valladolid	2–1	Espanyol	Valladolid
14:00 CET (UTC+1)	I. Sánchez 25'; Mesa (yellow card) 29'; Escudero (yellow card) 40'; Hongla (yellow card) 45+1'; Aguado 62'	Report	Gil (yellow card) 24'; Joselu (yellow card) 75'; Braithwaite 87'	Stadium: José Zorilla; Attendance: 19,212; Referee: Valentín Pizarro Gómez

11 March 2023 25	Elche	1–1	Valladolid	Elche
16:15 CET (UTC+1)	Gumbau (yellow card) 20'; Morente (yellow card) 71', (goal) 90+6'; Milla (yellow card) 90+6'; Mascarell (yellow card) 90+11'	Report	Larin 4', (yellow card) 90+11'; Plano (yellow card) 72'; Mesa (yellow card) 90+5' (yellow-red card) 90+10'; Hongla (yellow card) 90+11' (yellow-red card) 90+12'	Stadium: Martínez Valero; Attendance: 18,972; Referee: Isidro Díaz de Mera Escuderos

17 March 2023 26	Valladolid	1–3	Athletic Bilbao	Valladolid
21:00 CET (UTC+1)	J. Sánchez (yellow card) 6'; Larin 74', (yellow card) 88'	Report	Berchiche (yellow card) 23'; Martínez 30'; Guruzeta 57'; Vesga 78', (yellow card) 90'	Stadium: José Zorilla; Attendance: 21,707; Referee: Javier Alberola Rojas

2 April 2023 27	Real Madrid	6–0	Valladolid	Madrid
16:15 CEST (UTC+2)	Rodrygo 22'; Benzema 29', 32', 36'; Asensio 73'; Vázquez 90+1'	Report	Fresneda (yellow card) 64'	Stadium: Santiago Bernabéu; Attendance: 59,400; Referee: Juan Luis Pulido Santana

9 April 2023 28	Valladolid	3–3	Mallorca	Valladolid
14:00 CEST (UTC+2)	Mesa (yellow card) 10'; Kike 33'; Rosa (yellow card) 56'; Amallah 68'; Monchu 86'; Larin (yellow card) 90+3'	Report	Ruiz de Galarreta (yellow card) 38'; Valjent (yellow card) 45+1'; Muriqi 53', 90+4' (pen.); Morlanes 58', (yellow card) 74'; Costa (yellow card) 64'; Abdón (yellow card) 90+3'	Stadium: José Zorilla; Attendance: 18,010; Referee: Alejandro Muñiz Ruiz

15 April 2023 29	Villarreal	1–2	Valladolid	Villarreal
14:00 CEST (UTC+2)	Pedraza (yellow card) 30'; Capoue 74'	Report	Amallah 2', (yellow card) 41'; El Yamiq 34'; Monchu (yellow card) 56'; Masip (yellow card) 69'; Mesa (yellow card) 88'; Kike (yellow card) 90+1'; Kenedy (yellow card) 90+2'	Stadium: Estadio de la Cerámica; Attendance: 14,876; Referee: Javier Iglesias Villanueva

22 April 2023 30	Valladolid	1–0	Girona	Valladolid
18:30 CEST (UTC+2)	Monchu 24'; Amallah (yellow card) 68'	Report	Martín (yellow card) 41'	Stadium: José Zorilla; Attendance: 21,033; Referee: Mario Melero López

27 April 2023 31	Valencia	2–1	Valladolid	Valencia
19:30 CEST (UTC+2)	Diakhaby 60'; Guerra 90+3'	Report	Larin 6'; Kike (yellow card) 55'; Masip (yellow card) 57'; Hongla (yellow card) 66'; Joaquín (yellow card) 71'	Stadium: Mestalla; Attendance: 42,023; Referee: José Luis Munuera Montero

30 April 2023 32	Valladolid	2–5	Atlético Madrid	Valladolid
21:00 CEST (UTC+2)	Monchu (yellow card) 9'; Larin 42' (pen.); Kike (yellow card) 44'; Escudero 74'	Report	Molina 20'; Giménez 24'; Morata 38'; Hermoso (yellow card) 40'; Joaquín 86' (o.g.); Depay 90+3'	Stadium: José Zorrilla; Attendance: 23,321; Referee: Antonio Miguel Mateu Lahoz

4 May 2023 33	Rayo Vallecano	2–1	Valladolid	Madrid
22:00 CEST (UTC+2)	De Tomás 48'; Camello 80'	Report	León 84'	Stadium: Vallecas; Attendance: 11,171; Referee: Isidro Díaz de Mera Escuderos

14 May 2023 34	Valladolid	0–3	Sevilla	Valladolid
18:30 CEST (UTC+2)	Kike (yellow card) 45+4'; Torres (yellow card) 47'	Report	Mir 50'; Telles (yellow card) 64'; Gómez 78'; Corona 90+3'	Stadium: José Zorilla; Attendance: 21,580; Referee: Miguel Ángel Ortiz Arias

19 May 2023 35	Cádiz	2–0	Valladolid	Cádiz
21:00 CEST (UTC+2)	Alcaraz (penalty missed) 36'; Bongonda 69', 76', (yellow card) 77'; Lozano (yellow card) 73'; San Emeterio (yellow card) 86'; Mbaye (yellow card) 90+3'	Report	El Yamiq (yellow card) 33'; Rosa (yellow card) 48'; Mesa (yellow card) 67'; J. Sánchez (yellow card) 75'; Hongla (red card) 80'	Stadium: Nuevo Mirandilla; Attendance: 18,938; Referee: Juan Martínez Munuera

23 May 2023 36	Valladolid	3–1	Barcelona	Valladolid
22:00 CEST (UTC+2)	Christensen 2' (o.g.); Larin 22' (pen.); Fresneda (yellow card) 27'; Plata 73'	Report	Raphinha (yellow card) 62'; Lewandowski 84'	Stadium: José Zorrilla; Attendance: 22,341; Referee: César Soto Grado

28 May 2023 37	Almería	0–0	Valladolid	Almería
19:00 CEST (UTC+2)		Report	Monchu (yellow card) 70'; Plata (yellow card) 89'; Hongla (yellow card) 90+2'; Kenedy (yellow card) 90+6'	Stadium: Power Horse Stadium; Attendance: 14,608; Referee: Javier Alberola Rojas

4 June 2023 38	Valladolid	0–0	Getafe	Valladolid
21:00 CEST (UTC+2)	El Yamiq (yellow card) 45+5'	Report	Iglesias (yellow card) 45+4'; Álvarez (yellow card) 45+5'; Latasa (yellow card) 90+4'	Stadium: José Zorilla; Attendance: 25,517; Referee: José Luis Munuera Montero

=== Copa del Rey ===
12 November 2022 First round	Barbadás	0–2	Valladolid	Ourense (Note: Barbadás did not play the game in their main stadium Os Carrís, Barbadás, as it did not meet the broadcasting requirements.)
16:00 CET (UTC+1)	Xinzo (yellow card) 58'; Nespereira (yellow card) 60'	Report	Faria 12' (o.g.); León 39'; Kike (penalty missed) 78'	Stadium: O Couto; Referee: Pablo González Fuertes

21 December 2022 Second round	Arenas Getxo	1–5	Valladolid	Getxo
21:00 CET (UTC+1)	Bengoetxea 29'; Gastesi (yellow card) 61'; López (yellow card) 85'; Alonso (yellow card) 86'	Report	Monchu (yellow card) 24'; Escudero 35'; Weissman 45'; Fernández (yellow card) 52'; I. Sánchez 53'; Kike 76', (yellow card) 86'; León 81'; Mesa (yellow card) 89'	Stadium: Campo Municipal de Gobela; Attendance: 1,200; Referee: Carlos del Cerro Grande

4 January 2023 Round of 32	Alavés	1–0	Valladolid	Vitoria
21:00 CET (UTC+1)	Sylla 11'; Balboa (yellow card) 28'; Arroyo (yellow card) 31'; Sedlar (yellow card) 77'; Salva (yellow card) 86'	Report	Feddal (yellow card) 5' (yellow-red card) 5'; Malsa (yellow card) 41'; Kike (yellow card) 62'; Plata (yellow card) 86'	Stadium: Mendizorrotza; Attendance: 8,800; Referee: Miguel Ángel Ortiz Arias

== Statistics ==
=== Appearances and goals ===
No.	Pos	Nat	Player	Total		La Liga		Copa del Rey	
No.	Pos	Nat	Player	Apps	Goals	Apps	Goals	Apps	Goals
Goalkeepers
1	GK	(Spain) ESP	Jordi Masip	24	0	23	0	1	0
25	GK	(Spain) ESP	Sergio Asenjo	11	0	9	0	2	0
Defenders
2	DF	(Spain) ESP	Luis Pérez	19	0	14+3	0	2	0
3	DF	(Morocco) MAR	Zouhair Feddal	10	0	4+4	0	2	0
5	DF	(Spain) ESP	Javi Sánchez	29	1	23+4	1	2	0
12	DF	(Uruguay) URU	Lucas Olaza	19	0	13+6	0	0	0
15	DF	(Morocco) MAR	Jawad El Yamiq	23	0	17+6	0	0	0
18	DF	(Spain) ESP	Sergio Escudero	20	1	15+4	0	1	1
20	DF	(Cameroon) CMR	Martin Hongla	13	0	12+1	0	0	0
24	DF	(Spain) ESP	Joaquín Fernández	27	1	22+3	1	2	0
27	DF	(Spain) ESP	Iván Fresneda	22	0	16+4	0	1+1	0
39	DF	(Brazil) BRA	Lucas Rosa	15	0	9+3	0	3	0
Midfielders
4	MF	(Spain) ESP	Kike Pérez	34	1	25+6	0	3	1
6	MF	(Spain) ESP	Álvaro Aguado	32	0	15+15	0	2	0
8	MF	(Spain) ESP	Monchu	31	3	21+8	3	2	0
17	MF	(Spain) ESP	Roque Mesa	27	2	17+8	2	2	0
23	MF	(Morocco) MAR	Anuar Tuhami	3	1	3	1	0	0
Forwards
7	FW	(Spain) ESP	Sergio León	28	7	13+13	5	2	2
9	FW	(Belgium) BEL	Selim Amallah	7	2	3+4	2	0	0
10	FW	(Spain) ESP	Óscar Plano	33	1	20+10	1	2+1	0
11	FW	(Ecuador) ECU	Gonzalo Plata	31	0	22+7	0	2	0
19	FW	(Brazil) BRA	Kenedy	9	0	1+7	0	0+1	0
21	FW	(Spain) ESP	Iván Sánchez	26	1	13+11	0	2	1
22	FW	(Venezuela) VEN	Darwin Machís	7	0	4+3	0	0	0
25	FW	(Canada) CAN	Cyle Larin	14	7	11+3	7	0	0
Players who have made an appearance this season but have left the club on loan/permanent
9	FW	(Israel) ISR	Shon Weissman	17	2	6+9	1	2	1
14	MF	(Martinique) MTQ	Mickaël Malsa	6	0	0+5	0	1	0
16	FW	(Spain) ESP	Sergi Guardiola	15	0	8+6	0	0+1	0
19	FW	(Spain) ESP	Toni Villa	2	0	1+1	0	0	0
20	FW	(Colombia) COL	Juanjo Narváez	7	0	1+4	0	2	0

Last updated: 4 May 2023
Source: Competitions

=== Goalscorers ===
Rank	Pos	No.	Nat	Name	La Liga	Copa del Rey	Total
1	FW	7	(Spain)	Sergio León	5	2	7
2	FW	25	(Canada)	Cyle Larin	3	0	3
3	MF	17	(Spain)	Roque Mesa	2	0	2
4	FW	9	(Israel)	Shon Weissman	1	1	2
5	FW	21	(Spain)	Iván Sánchez	1	1	2
6	MF	4	(Spain)	Kike Pérez	0	1	1
6	DF	5	(Spain)	Javi Sánchez	1	0	1
6	MF	8	(Spain)	Monchu	1	0	1
6	MF	10	(Spain)	Óscar Plano	1	0	1
6	DF	18	(Spain)	Sergio Escudero	0	1	1
6	MF	23	(Morocco)	Anuar Tuhami	1	0	1
6	MF	24	(Spain)	Joaquín Fernández	1	0	1
Totals					18	6	24

Last updated: 18 February 2023
