= David Torres =

David Torres may refer to:

- David Torres (footballer, born 1986), Spanish football forward
- David Torres (footballer, born 2003), Spanish football defender
