= Josep Sucarrats =

Catalan journalist

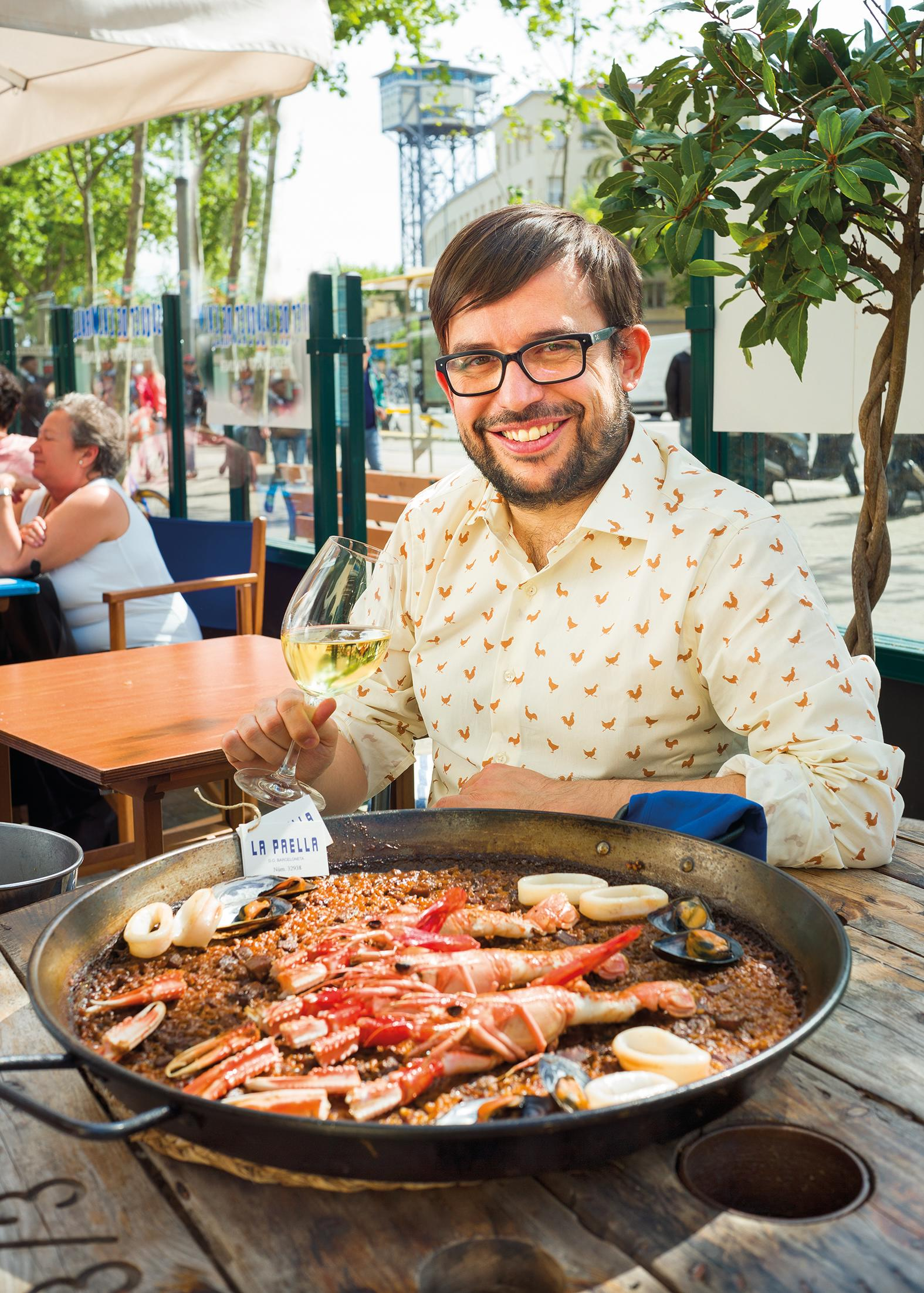
Josep Sucarrats behind a paella.

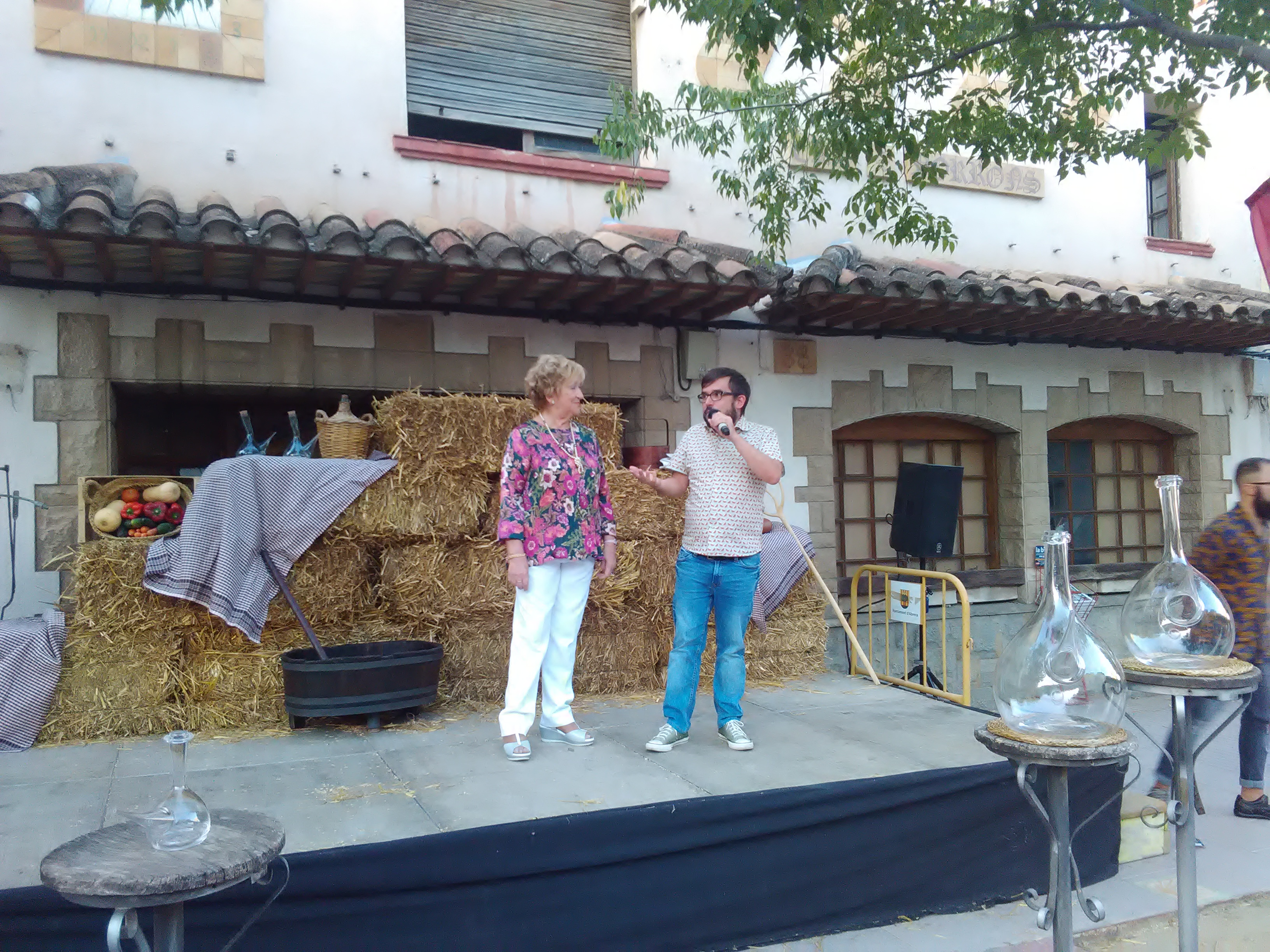
Josep Sucarrats opening the First "Porrons d'Abrera" Gastronomic Fair (2018).

Josep Sucarrats Miró (Abrera, Catalonia, Spain, 28 February 1975) is a Catalan writer, specialized in gastronomy.

Sucarrats was the director of the gastronomic review Cuina, leader in its sector in Catalonia, and also a writer in some other mass media, mainly in Catalan language.

Sucarrats is the author (with others) of the books Històries de la Barcelona gormanda (2014, with Sergi Martín, "Histories of gourmand Barcelona") and Teoria i pràctica del vermut (2015, with Miquel Àngel Vaquer and Sergi Martín, "Theory and performance of vermouth"), nearly an enciclopaedya of the vermouth.

In 2020 he published Mercados, un mundo por descubrir ("Marketplaces, a world to discover"), a book who explains to the children the marketplaces over the world, illustrated by Miranda Sofroniou. The New York Public Library included this book in the list of the best books of 2020.

From 2021, he published the magazine Arrels. El món que torna, which informations about traditional forms of life.
