= Israel Salazar =

Israel Salazar may refer to:

- Israel Salazar (singer)
- Israel Salazar (footballer)
