= Mario Maroto =

Spanish footballer (born 2003)

Personal information
- Full name: Mario Maroto Argüello
- Date of birth: 28 November 2003 (age 22)
- Place of birth: Valladolid, Spain
- Height: 1.76 m (5 ft 9 in)
- Position: Midfielder

Team information
- Current team: Logroñés

Youth career
- Villa de Simancas
- Valladolid

Senior career*
Years	Team	Apps	(Gls)
2021–2025	Valladolid B	76	(5)
2023–2024	→ Atlético Madrid B (loan)	17	(1)
2024–2026	Valladolid	12	(1)
2026–	Logroñés	0	(0)
- * Club domestic league appearances and goals as of 31 May 2026

Mario Maroto Argüello (born 28 November 2003) is a Spanish footballer who plays as a midfielder for UD Logroñés.

== Career ==
Born in Valladolid, Castile and León, Maroto joined Real Valladolid's youth sides from CD Villa de Simancas. On 24 November 2020, he extended his contract with the former until 2024.

Maroto made his senior debut with the reserves on 30 January 2021, coming on as a late substitute for Oriol Rey in a 3–1 Segunda División B away win over CD Covadonga. He scored his first senior goal on 19 March 2023, netting the B's third in a 3–3 Segunda Federación home draw against CD Palencia Cristo Atlético.

On 31 August 2023, Maroto was loaned to Primera Federación side Atlético Madrid B for the season. Upon returning, he was assigned back at the B-team before making his professional – and La Liga – debut on 27 September 2024, replacing fellow youth graduate David Torres in a 2–1 home loss to RCD Mallorca.

Definitely promoted to the first team of the Blanquivioletas for the 2025–26 campaign, Maroto scored his first professional goal on 13 September 2025, netting his side's third in a 3–1 home win over UD Almería. The following 2 June, after being rarely used, the club announced his departure as his contract was due to expire, and he signed for third division side UD Logroñés on 14 July 2026.
