= Iván Sánchez (footballer) =

Spanish footballer (born 1992)

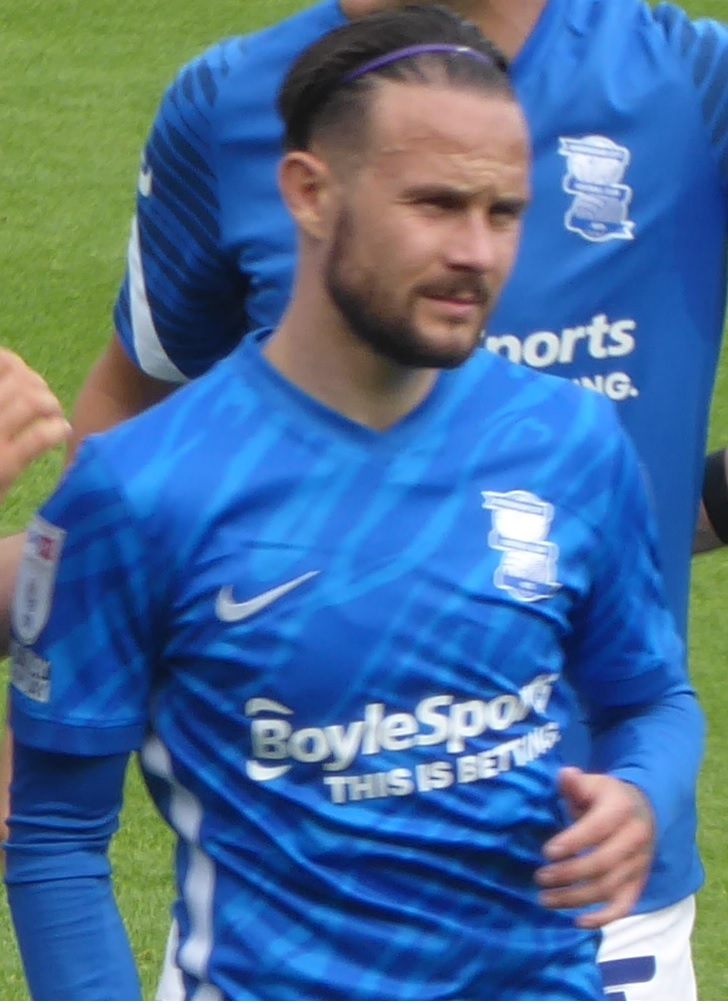
- Sánchez with Birmingham City in 2021

Personal information
- Full name: Iván Sánchez Aguayo
- Date of birth: 23 September 1992 (age 34)
- Place of birth: Campillo de Arenas, Spain
- Height: 1.69 m (5 ft 7 in)
- Position: Winger

Youth career
- 2006–2010: Jaén

Senior career*
Years	Team	Apps	(Gls)
2009–2011	Jaén B	11	(2)
2010–2011	Jaén	27	(1)
2011–2014	Atlético Madrid B	82	(6)
2014–2015	Almería B	37	(10)
2014–2017	Almería	33	(0)
2017	→ Albacete (loan)	14	(1)
2017–2018	Albacete	0	(0)
2017–2018	→ Elche (loan)	29	(1)
2018–2020	Elche	73	(8)
2020–2022	Birmingham City	42	(2)
2022	→ Valladolid (loan)	12	(2)
2022–2025	Valladolid	95	(3)
2025–2026	Sepahan	15	(0)
- * Club domestic league appearances and goals as of 27 May 2025

Iván Sánchez Aguayo (born 23 September 1992) is a Spanish professional footballer who plays as a winger.

Sánchez previously played domestically at second- and third-tier level for Real Jaén, Atlético Madrid B, Almería B, Almería, Albacete and Elche, and helped Elche gain promotion to La Liga in 2020. He then spent 18 months with Birmingham City of the EFL Championship before joining Valladolid in 2022, initially on loan.

== Career ==
=== Jaén ===
Sánchez was born in Campillo de Arenas, in the province of Jaén in Andalusia. He learnt his football in the youth system of Real Jaén, and made his senior debut with the reserves in 2009–10 in the Primera Andaluza. He moved into the first team the following season, and appeared regularly for them in the third-tier Segunda División B.

=== Atlético Madrid B ===
On 14 July 2011, Sánchez signed a three-year deal with Atlético Madrid. He was allocated to Atlético's B team, who also played in the Segunda B. He played 18 matches in 2011–12, and represented the club at the 2012 U-20 Copa Libertadores in Peru. In what the player attributed to his performance at that tournament, he was called up by manager Diego Simeone for pre-season training with the first team ahead of the 2012–13 season. It was as close as he got to first-team action. He was a regular for Atlético B in the second and third years of his contract, and missed only three matches in 2013–14 as they avoided relegation via the play-out with the help of a Sánchez goal.

=== Almería ===
In June 2014, Sánchez signed a three-year contract with another top-flight club, Almería, where he was again recruited for their B team playing in the Segunda B. In his first season, he appeared twice for the first team in the 2014–15 Copa del Rey, the first of which was on 5 December when he started in a 4–3 away win against Real Betis, but he only played league football for the reserves.

Almería were relegated that season, and Sánchez was included in the first-team squad for 2015–16. He made his Segunda División debut on 6 September, as a second-half substitute for Quique González in a 2–1 home win over Osasuna, and went on to play 25 matches in all competitions.

=== Albacete and loan to Elche ===
Sánchez was used sparingly by Almería during the first half of the season, and on 18 January 2017 he was loaned to third-tier club Albacete Balompié until June. He helped them to win promotion, and joined them on a permanent basis at the end of the season, but never played.

He was loaned to Segunda División B club Elche CF in August, and played a key role in their promotion back to the second tier. On 26 June 2018, he signed a two-year permanent deal with the club on a free transfer. Sánchez became a regular for the side, scoring 7 goals in 36 appearances during his first full season at the club at Segunda División level. In his second season, Elche were promoted back to La Liga for the first time in five years, defeating Girona FC in the play-offs.

=== Birmingham City ===
On 27 August 2020, Sánchez signed as a free agent for English Championship (second-tier) club Birmingham City; he agreed a three-year contract with the option of a fourth. He made his debut in the starting eleven for Birmingham's opening fixture of the Championship season, at home to Brentford on 12 September; after 37 minutes he took a whipped corner from which Jérémie Bela scored the only goal of the game with a glancing near-post header. He was named in the Championship Team of the Month for September, and in the first match of October, a draw away to Stoke City, he took the corner from which Harlee Dean headed the opening goal. Away to Cardiff City on 16 December, he "ripped through their defence with a slaloming run as he skipped past three defenders and lashed the ball home left footed from the edge of the area" to give Birmingham a 2–1 lead with his first goal for the club; the match ended as a 3–2 defeat, but the goal was voted Birmingham's Goal of the Season.

Sánchez was a regular in the struggling side under head coach Aitor Karanka, but towards the end of the season was suffering with a hernia, and needed injections to continue. He played only twice under new head coach Lee Bowyer as the team avoided relegation, and began the next season still in pain. After two appearances from the bench, he underwent surgery, and returned to the substitutes' bench in October, but continued pain forced a return to a specialist and further surgery.

=== Real Valladolid ===
While still unfit, Sánchez moved to Segunda Division side Real Valladolid on 31 January 2022 on loan until the end of the season. He eventually made his debut on 5 March, as a second-half substitute in a 4–1 win away to Tenerife, and soon established himself in the starting eleven. He finished the season with 12 appearances (8 starts) and scored twice, helping Valladolid to gain promotion as runners-up, behind Almería only on goal difference. His loan deal included an option to buy, but not an obligation to do so. He made it clear that he wanted to stay, and El Desmarque highlighted "his quality in driving forward, dribbling and shooting with his left foot" and noted that his entry into the game changes his team for the better. The player said if it was up to him, there would be no issue with agreeing terms with Valladolid.

Sánchez's stay at Real Valladolid was made permanent at the end of the season when he signed a two-year contract with an option for a third. The fee was undisclosed, but was reported to be as little as €100,000. On 13 August 2022, a few weeks short of his 30th birthday, Sánchez made his first appearance in top-flight football when he replaced Gonzalo Plata in the second half of Valladolid's opening match of the season, a 3–0 defeat at home to Villarreal. He made 25 appearances in the 2022–23 La Liga campaign, at the end of which Valladolid returned to the second tier, and a further 38 in 2023–24 – enough to guarantee the renewal of his contract for another year – as they were again promoted as runners-up.

== Career statistics ==
As of match played 15 March 2025

Appearances and goals by club, season and competition
Club	Season	League			National cup (Note: Includes Copa del Rey, FA Cup)		League cup (Note: Includes EFL Cup)		Other		Total	
Club	Season	Division	Apps	Goals	Apps	Goals	Apps	Goals	Apps	Goals	Apps	Goals
Real Jaén	2010–11	Segunda División B	27	1	1	0	—		—		28	1
Atlético Madrid B	2011–12	Segunda División B	18	0	—		—		—		18	0
Atlético Madrid B	2012–13	Segunda División B	29	3	—		—		—		29	3
Atlético Madrid B	2013–14	Segunda División B	35	3	—		—		2 (Note: Appearances in Segunda División B relegation play-offs)	1	37	4
Atlético Madrid B	Total		82	6	—		—		2	1	84	7
Almería B	2014–15	Segunda División B	37	10	—		—		2 (Note: Appearances in Segunda División B play-offs)	1	39	11
Almería	2014–15	La Liga	0	0	2	0	—		—		2	0
Almería	2015–16	Segunda División	24	0	1	0	—		—		25	0
Almería	2016–17	Segunda División	9	0	1	0	—		—		10	0
Almería	Total		33	0	4	0	—		—		37	0
Albacete (loan)	2016–17	Segunda División B	14	1	—		—		6	0	20	1
Albacete	2017–18	Segunda División	0	0	—		—		—		0	0
Albacete	Total		14	1	—		—		6	0	20	1
Elche (loan)	2017–18	Segunda División B	29	1	5	0	—		5	2	39	3
Elche	2018–19	Segunda División	36	7	1	0	—		—		37	7
Elche	2019–20	Segunda División	37	1	3	0	—		4 (Note: Appearances in Segunda División play-offs)	0	44	1
Elche	Total		102	9	9	0	—		9	2	120	11
Birmingham City	2020–21	Championship	40	2	1	0	0	0	—		41	2
Birmingham City	2021–22	Championship	2	0	0	0	1	0	—		3	0
Birmingham City	Total		42	2	1	0	1	0	—		44	2
Real Valladolid (loan)	2021–22	Segunda División	12	2	—		—		—		12	2
Real Valladolid	2022–23	La Liga	25	1	2	1	—		—		27	2
Real Valladolid	2023–24	Segunda División	38	0	2	0	—		—		40	0
Real Valladolid	2024–25	La Liga	23	1	3	0	—		—		26	1
Real Valladolid	Total		98	4	7	1	—		—		105	5
Career total			435	33	22	1	1	0	19	4	477	38
