= Raúl Moro =

Spanish footballer (born 2002)

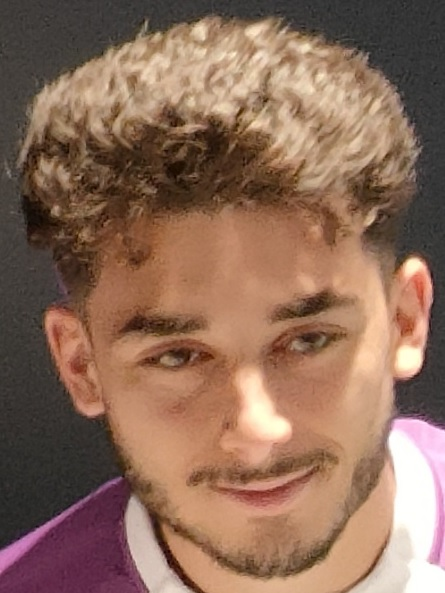
- Moro with Valladolid in 2023

Personal information
- Full name: Raúl Moro Prescoli
- Date of birth: 5 December 2002 (age 23)
- Place of birth: Abrera, Spain
- Height: 1.69 m (5 ft 7 in)
- Position: Winger

Team information
- Current team: Osasuna
- Number: 18

Youth career
- 2014–2017: Gimnàstic Manresa
- 2017–2018: Espanyol
- 2018–2019: Barcelona
- 2019–2021: Lazio

Senior career*
Years	Team	Apps	(Gls)
2020–2024	Lazio	13	(0)
2022–2023	→ Ternana (loan)	12	(1)
2023	→ Oviedo (loan)	16	(0)
2023–2024	→ Valladolid (loan)	30	(2)
2024–2025	Valladolid	33	(4)
2025–2026	Ajax	14	(0)
2026–	Osasuna	14	(0)

International career^{‡}
2017–2019	Spain U17	6	(2)
2019–2020	Spain U18	2	(0)
2021–	Spain U21	12	(0)
- * Club domestic league appearances and goals as of 27 May 2026 ‡ National team caps and goals as of 23:21, 21 June 2025 (UTC)

Raúl Moro Prescoli (born 5 December 2002) is a Spanish professional footballer who plays as a winger for La Liga club Osasuna.

Born in Abrera, Moro developed in the youth academies of Espanyol and Barcelona. He began his professional career with Italian side Lazio, where he made his senior debut in 2020. After loan spells with Ternana and Real Oviedo, he joined Real Valladolid in 2023, helping the club achieve promotion to La Liga during the 2023–24 season. In July 2025, he signed for Ajax. He returned to Spain with Osasuna in January 2026.

Moro is a youth international for Spain, having represented the country at under-17, under-18, and under-21 levels.

== Club career ==
=== Early career and Lazio ===
Born in Abrera, Barcelona, Catalonia, Moro began his career with Igualada and Gimnàstic Manresa before joining Espanyol. In 2018, he moved to local rivals FC Barcelona, joining La Masia. He left Barcelona after one season to join Lazio.

On 31 August 2019, Moro signed for the Serie A club for a reported fee of €6 million. He initially played for Lazio's Primavera (under-19) side. He made his professional debut for Lazio on 20 July 2020, coming on as a substitute in a 2–1 Serie A defeat to Juventus. He made 20 total appearances for the first team over three seasons.

=== Loans in Italy and Spain ===
On 23 August 2022, Moro joined Serie B club Ternana on a season-long loan. He scored his first professional goal on 8 October 2022 in a 3–0 win against Palermo. His loan was terminated in January 2023.

On 25 January 2023, he returned to Spain, joining Segunda División side Real Oviedo on loan until the end of the season.

=== Real Valladolid ===
On 17 July 2023, Moro moved to Real Valladolid on a one-year loan deal with a purchase option. He contributed 2 goals and 5 assists in 30 league appearances as Valladolid finished second in the 2023–24 Segunda División, earning automatic promotion to La Liga.

Following promotion, Valladolid exercised their buy option, and Moro signed a permanent contract until 2028. During the 2024–25 season, Moro recorded 4 goals and 5 assists in 33 appearances.

=== Ajax ===
On 15 July 2025, Dutch club AFC Ajax announced the signing of Moro on a five-year contract.

=== Osasuna ===
On 22 January 2026, Moro returned to Spain with La Liga side Osasuna on a permanent transfer for €5 million, potentially rising to €8 million. His contract runs until 2031, with a €50 million release clause.

== International career ==
Moro has represented Spain at various youth levels. He was a member of the under-17 squad that competed in qualifiers for the 2019 UEFA European Under-17 Championship. In 2021, he made his debut for the Spain U21 team during the 2023 UEFA European Under-21 Championship qualification.

== Style of play ==
Moro is a right-footed winger who typically plays on the left flank, operating as an inverted winger. He is noted for his acceleration and ability to beat defenders in one-on-one situations.

== Career statistics ==
As of match played 17 January 2026

Appearances and goals by club, season and competition
Club	Season	League			National cup (Note: Includes Coppa Italia, Copa del Rey)		Europe		Total	
Club	Season	Division	Apps	Goals	Apps	Goals	Apps	Goals	Apps	Goals
Lazio	2019–20	Serie A	1	0	0	0	—		1	0
Lazio	2020–21	Serie A	1	0	0	0	0	0	1	0
Lazio	2021–22	Serie A	11	0	2	0	5 (Note: Appearances in UEFA Europa League)	0	18	0
Lazio	Total		13	0	2	0	5	0	20	0
Ternana (loan)	2022–23	Serie B	12	1	0	0	—		12	1
Oviedo (loan)	2022–23	Segunda División	16	0	0	0	—		16	0
Valladolid (loan)	2023–24	Segunda División	30	2	1	0	—		31	2
Valladolid	2024–25	La Liga	33	4	1	1	—		34	5
Valladolid	Total		63	6	2	1	—		65	7
Ajax	2025–26	Eredivisie	14	0	1	1	5 (Note: Appearances in UEFA Champions League)	0	20	1
Osasuna	2025–26	La Liga	0	0	0	0	—		0	0
Career total			118	7	5	2	10	0	133	9
