= Lucas Rosa =

Brazilian footballer (born 2000)

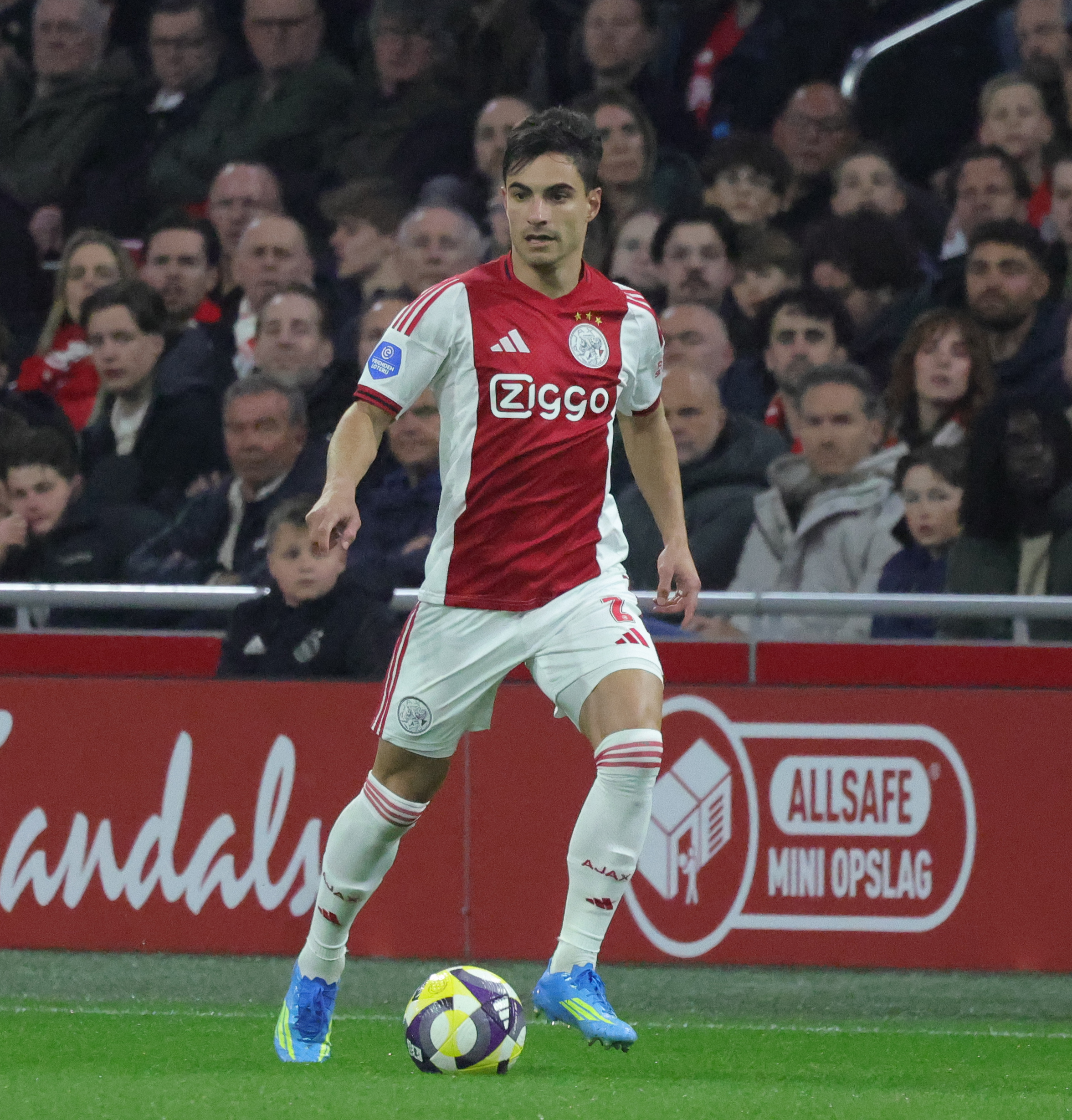
- Rosa with Ajax in 2026

Personal information
- Full name: Lucas Oliveira Rosa
- Date of birth: 3 April 2000 (age 26)
- Place of birth: Ribeirão Preto, Brazil
- Height: 1.74 m (5 ft 9 in)
- Position: Right-back

Team information
- Current team: Ajax
- Number: 2

Youth career
- Vale Sports
- 2015–2016: Taubaté
- 2017–2018: Palmeiras
- 2018–2019: Juventus

Senior career*
Years	Team	Apps	(Gls)
2019–2021	Juventus U23	31	(0)
2021–2022	Valladolid B	25	(1)
2022–2025	Valladolid	73	(1)
2025–	Ajax	38	(0)

International career^{‡}
2016	Brazil U17	1	(0)
- * Club domestic league appearances and goals as of 25 October 2026 ‡ National team caps and goals as of 00:50, 31 October 2022 (UTC)

Lucas Oliveira Rosa (born 3 April 2000) is a Brazilian professional footballer who plays as a defender for Dutch club Ajax. Mainly a right-back, he has been deployed as a right wing-back and a left-back on occasion.

Internationally, Lucas played for his native Brazil at under-17 level.

== Club career ==
=== Early career ===
Born in Ribeirão Preto, São Paulo, Lucas played for local Vale Sports, Taubaté and Palmeiras' youth categories.

=== Juventus ===
In April 2018, Lucas moved to Italy to join Juventus, initially playing for their Primavera (under-19) squad. He was promoted to the Juventus U23 team (later renamed Juventus Next Gen) competing in Serie C. He made his professional debut for the U23s on 30 March 2019, coming on as a second-half substitute against Pistoiese. Over three seasons, Rosa made 31 appearances for Juventus U23 in Serie C. He was also part of the squad that won the Coppa Italia Serie C in the 2019–20 season.

=== Real Valladolid ===
On 27 May 2021, Rosa signed a four-year contract with Spanish club Real Valladolid, initially assigned to the reserve team, Real Valladolid Promesas, playing in the Primera Federación. He was a regular starter for the B team during the 2021–22 season, making 25 appearances and scoring his first professional goal against Calahorra on 16 April 2022.

Rosa was promoted to the Real Valladolid first team for the 2022–23 season. He made his senior debut for the club on 19 October 2022, starting in a 4–1 La Liga defeat against Celta. He made his Copa del Rey debut on 12 November against Barbadás. He featured regularly throughout the season, making 17 La Liga appearances and 3 Copa del Rey appearances as Valladolid suffered relegation. In the 2023–24 season, Rosa was a key player in the Segunda División, making 35 league appearances and scoring once as the team achieved immediate promotion back to La Liga. He continued as a regular starter in La Liga during the first half of the 2024–25 season, making 21 league appearances before his transfer. In total, he played 80 times for the Real Valladolid first team, scoring once.

=== Ajax ===
On 4 February 2025, Rosa moved to the Netherlands, joining Eredivisie side Ajax on a contract until 30 June 2029. He made his debut for the club on 13 February 2025, starting in a 2–0 away victory against Union SG in the UEFA Europa League knockout round play-offs. He subsequently made appearances in both the Eredivisie and the Europa League, including a notable performance against PSV Eindhoven on 30 March.

== International career ==
Lucas was born in Brazil, and is of Italian descent. As he was granted Italian citizenship, Lucas Rosa is also eligible to be called up to the Italy national team. Lucas represented Brazil at under-17 level during the preparation for the 2017 South American U-17 Championship.

== Career statistics ==
=== Club ===
As of 25 October 2026

Appearances and goals by club, season and competition
Club	Season	League			National cup		Europe		Other		Total	
Club	Season	Division	Apps	Goals	Apps	Goals	Apps	Goals	Apps	Goals	Apps	Goals
Juventus U23	2018–19	Serie C	2	0	—		—		—		2	0
Juventus U23	2019–20	Serie C	17	0	—		—		—		17	0
Juventus U23	2020–21	Serie C	12	0	—		—		—		12	0
Juventus U23	Total		31	0	—		—		—		31	0
Valladolid B	2021–22	Primera Federación	22	1	0	0	—		—		22	1
Valladolid B	2022–23	Segunda Federación	3	0	0	0	—		—		3	0
Valladolid B	Total		25	1	0	0	—		—		25	1
Valladolid	2022–23	La Liga	17	0	3	0	—		—		20	0
Valladolid	2023–24	Segunda División	35	1	2	0	—		—		37	1
Valladolid	2024–25	La Liga	21	0	2	0	—		—		23	0
Valladolid	Total		73	1	7	0	—		—		80	1
Ajax	2024–25	Eredivisie	5	0	0	0	3 (Note: Appearances in UEFA Europa League)	0	—		8	0
Ajax	2025–26	Eredivisie	27	0	1	0	3 (Note: Appearances in UEFA Champions League)	0	1 (Note: Appearance in Eredivisie European play-offs)	0	32	0
Ajax	2026–27	Eredivisie	6	0	0	0	6 (Note: Appearances in UEFA Conference League)	0	—		12	0
Ajax	Total		38	0	1	0	12	0	1	0	52	0
Career total			167	2	8	0	12	0	1	0	188	2

== Honours ==
Juventus U23

- Coppa Italia Serie C: 2019–20
