= Roberto Arroyo =

Spanish footballer

Personal information
- Full name: Roberto Arroyo Gregorio
- Date of birth: 25 August 2003 (age 23)
- Place of birth: Valladolid, Spain
- Height: 1.81 m (5 ft 11 in)
- Position: Forward

Youth career
- Villa de Simancas
- Valladolid

Senior career*
Years	Team	Apps	(Gls)
2021–2023	Valladolid B	60	(11)
2022–2024	Valladolid	1	(0)
2023–2024	→ Ibiza (loan)	32	(3)
2024–2026	Osasuna B	68	(6)
- * Club domestic league appearances and goals as of 23 May 2026

Roberto Arroyo Gregorio (born 25 August 2003) is a Spanish footballer who plays as a forward.

== Club career ==
Born in Valladolid, Castile and León, Arroyo represented CD Villa de Simancas and Real Valladolid as a youth. He made his senior debut with the reserves on 28 August 2021, starting in a 1–1 Primera División RFEF away draw against SD Logroñés.

Arroyo scored his first senior goal on 29 October 2021, netting the B's second in a 2–0 away win over CF Talavera de la Reina. The following 15 July, he renewed his contract until 2024.

Arroyo made his first team – and La Liga – debut on 28 August 2022, coming on as a second-half substitute for Anuar Tuhami in a 4–0 away loss against FC Barcelona. On 5 August of the following year, he moved to third division side UD Ibiza on a one-year loan deal.

On 8 July 2024, Arroyo signed with Osasuna B for two years, with a club option to extend the contract for two more years.
