= Abrera =

- Municipality
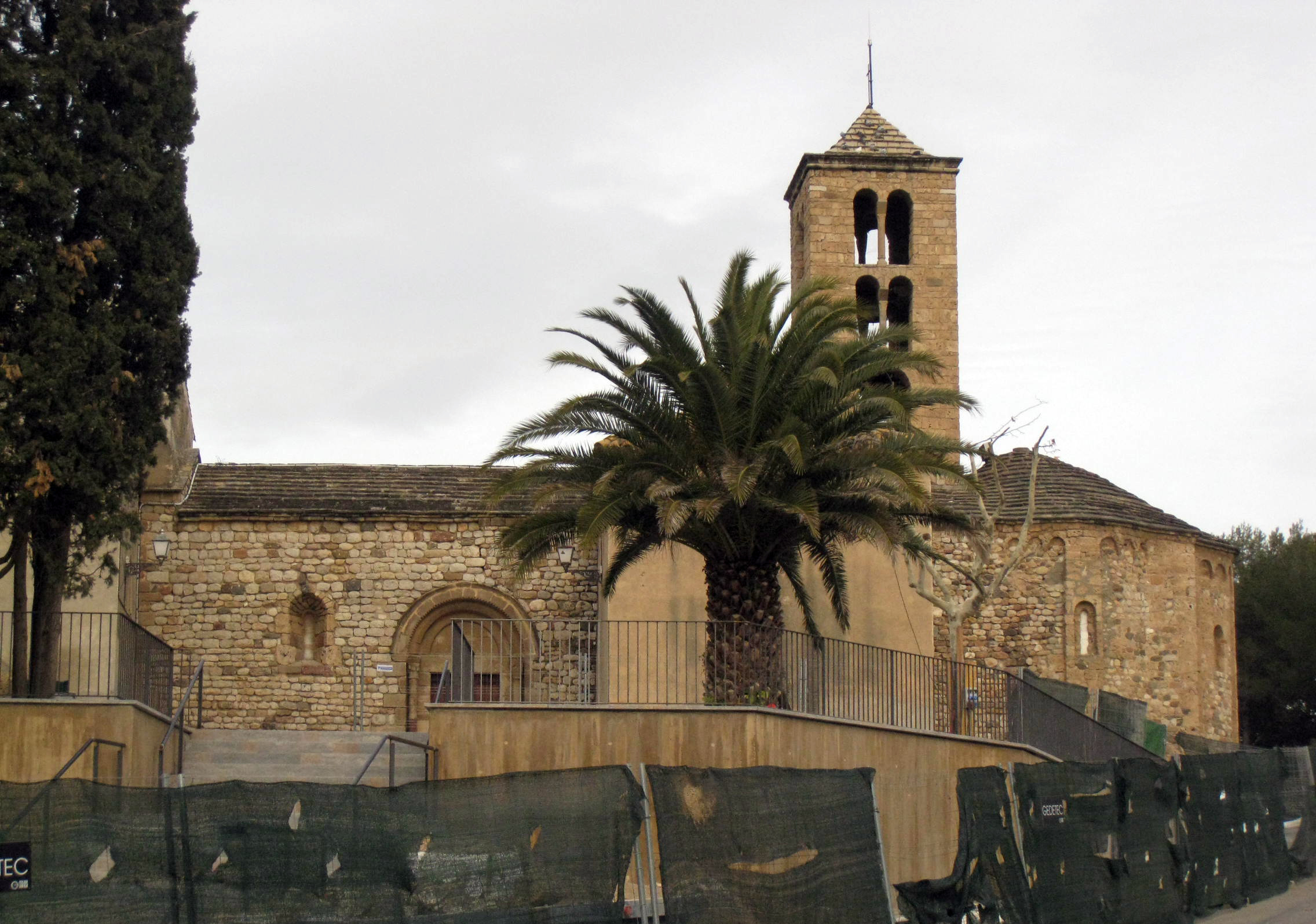
- Sant Pere d'Abrera

- Flag Coat of arms

- Location in Catalonia Abrera (Spain)
- Coordinates: 41°31′N 1°54′E
- Country: Spain
- Community: Catalonia
- Province: Barcelona
- Comarca: Baix Llobregat

Government
  - Mayor: Jesus Naharro Rodríguez (2015)

Area
  - Total: 19.98 km^{2} (7.71 sq mi)

Population (November 1, 2011)
  - Total: 11,815
  - Density: 591.3/km^{2} (1,531/sq mi)
- Time zone: UTC+01:00 (CET)
- Postal code: 08630
- Area code: 080018
- Website: Official website

Abrera (Catalan pronunciation: [əˈβɾeɾə]) is a municipality in the comarca of the Baix Llobregat in Catalonia, Spain. It is situated in the valley of the Llobregat river, to the south-east of Montserrat, on the main A2 road between Barcelona and Lleida. The municipality is served by the FGC railway line from Martorell to Manresa: the S4 and R5 services stop at the station.

Abrera is home to the SEAT Sport factory.

== Demography ==
According to Spanish census data, this is the population of Abrera in recent years.

1981	1991	2001	2011
4,221	5,464	8,624	11,815

== History ==
The remains of protohistoric ceramics found in the Barcelones estate and the vestiges of a field of silos from the Iberian era in the Torrent Gran, constitute the first indications of the existence of habitat in the municipality.

Traces of a Roman villa were found in Sant Hilari.

From the 15th-16th century onwards, the town grew with buildings and population, even during times of epidemics.

== Notable people ==
- Raúl Moro (born 2002), professional footballer
