= Iván Garriel =

Spanish footballer

Personal information
- Full name: Iván Garriel Muñoz
- Date of birth: 3 April 2005 (age 21)
- Place of birth: Íscar, Spain
- Height: 1.77 m (5 ft 10 in)
- Position: Left back

Team information
- Current team: Valladolid
- Number: 27

Youth career
- Íscar
- 2016–2022: Valladolid

Senior career*
Years	Team	Apps	(Gls)
2022–	Valladolid B	24	(0)
2023–	Valladolid	16	(0)
2024–2025	→ Celta B (loan)	32	(0)

International career
2021–2022	Spain U17	8	(0)
2022–	Spain U18	4	(0)
- * Club domestic league appearances and goals as of 9 June 2026

Iván Garriel Muñoz (born 3 April 2005), sometimes known as Garri, is a Spanish footballer who plays as a left back for Real Valladolid.

== Club career ==
Born in Íscar, Valladolid, Castile and León, Garriel joined Real Valladolid's at the age of 11, from CD Íscar. He made his senior debut with the reserves on 10 September 2022, coming on as a half-time substitute in a 1–0 Segunda Federación home loss to CD Guijuelo.

On 31 August 2023, Garriel renewed his contract with the club until 2027, being definitely promoted to the main squad in Segunda División. He made his professional debut on 10 September, replacing Sergio Escudero late into a 1–1 home draw against Elche CF.

On 11 July 2024, Garriel was loaned to Primera Federación side RC Celta Fortuna for the season.

== International career ==
Garriel represented Spain at under-17 and under-18 levels.
