= Israel Salazar (footballer) =

Spanish footballer

Personal information
- Full name: Israel Salazar Píriz
- Date of birth: 10 May 2003 (age 23)
- Place of birth: Badajoz, Spain
- Height: 1.77 m (5 ft 10 in)
- Position: Forward

Team information
- Current team: Estoril

Youth career
- 2008–2012: Guadalupe
- 2012–2013: San Roque Badajoz
- 2013–2015: Flecha Negra
- 2015–2020: Real Madrid

Senior career*
Years	Team	Apps	(Gls)
2020–2023	Real Madrid B	4	(0)
2022–2023	→ UCAM Murcia (loan)	28	(2)
2023–2024	Valladolid B	19	(3)
2023–2024	Valladolid	11	(2)
2024–	Estoril	12	(0)
2025–2026	→ Eldense (loan)	0	(0)

International career
2019	Spain U16	7	(2)
2018–2019	Spain U17	8	(5)
- * Club domestic league appearances and goals as of 3 June 2025

Israel Salazar Píriz (born 10 May 2003) is a Spanish footballer who plays as a forward for Primeira Liga club G.D. Estoril Praia.

== Club career ==
Born in Badajoz, Spain, Salazar played for ED Guadalupe, CD San Roque Badajoz and CP Flecha Negra before joining the youth ranks of Real Madrid in 2015. He progressed well through the academy, never scoring less than 16 goals in a season, and reached a landmark 150 goals in 2020. In October 2020, due to these stellar performances, he was named by English newspaper The Guardian as one of the best players born in 2003 worldwide.

In August 2022, Salazar was loaned to Segunda Federación side UCAM Murcia CF. On 26 July 2023, he signed a two-year contract with Real Valladolid, being assigned to the reserves also in the fourth level.

Salazar made his first team debut with the Pucelanos on 5 December 2023, replacing Iván Cédric and scoring his team's only in a 3–1 away loss against RCD Espanyol, for the season's Copa del Rey. The following 15 August, he signed a four-year contract with Portuguese Primeira Liga side G.D. Estoril Praia.

On 5 August 2025, after being sparingly used, Salazar returned to his home country after agreeing to a one-year loan deal with CD Eldense in Primera Federación.

== International career ==
Salazar has represented Spain at under-16 and under-17 level.

== Career statistics ==
=== Club ===
As of 9 December 2022.

Club	Season	League			Cup		Other		Total	
Club	Season	Division	Apps	Goals	Apps	Goals	Apps	Goals	Apps	Goals
Real Madrid Castilla	2020–21	Segunda División B	3	0	–		1 (Note: Appearances in 2021 Segunda División B play-offs)	0	4	0
Real Madrid Castilla	2021–22	Primera División RFEF	1	0	–		0	0	1	0
Real Madrid Castilla	Total		4	0	0	0	1	0	5	0
UCAM Murcia (loan)	2022–23	Segunda Federación	28	2	0	0	3 (Note: Appearances in 2023 Segunda Federación play-offs)	0	31	2
Real Valladolid Promesas	2023–24	Segunda Federación	13	2	–		0	0	13	2
Real Valladolid	2023–24	Segunda División	1	1	1	1	0	0	2	2
Career total			46	5	1	1	4	0	51	6
