= Mamadou Sylla (footballer, born 1994) =

Senegalese footballer

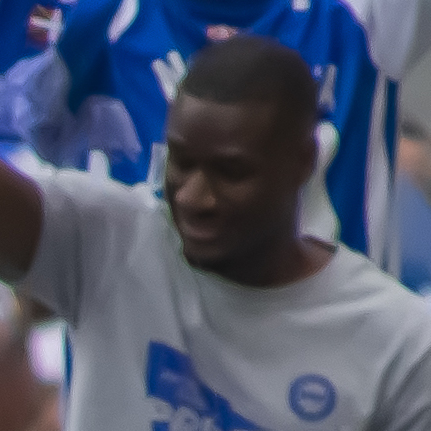
- Sylla in 2023

Personal information
- Full name: Mamadou Sylla Diallo
- Date of birth: 20 March 1994 (age 32)
- Place of birth: Kédougou, Senegal
- Height: 1.84 m (6 ft 0 in)
- Position: Forward

Team information
- Current team: Al-Ittihad
- Number: 9

Youth career
- 2009–2011: Barcelona
- 2011–2012: Mataró
- 2012–2013: Espanyol

Senior career*
Years	Team	Apps	(Gls)
2013–2015	Espanyol B	64	(15)
2015	→ Racing Santander (loan)	11	(3)
2015–2017	Espanyol	14	(0)
2016–2017	→ Eupen (loan)	35	(12)
2017–2020	Gent	29	(1)
2018	→ Zulte Waregem (loan)	14	(1)
2019	→ Sint-Truiden (loan)	13	(4)
2020	→ Orenburg (loan)	5	(0)
2020–2021	Girona	37	(9)
2021–2023	Alavés	34	(4)
2022	→ Rayo Vallecano (loan)	12	(0)
2023–2025	Valladolid	58	(13)
2025–2026	Al-Riyadh	30	(10)
2026-	Al-Ittihad	0	(0)
- * Club domestic league appearances and goals as of 03 October 2026

Mamadou Sylla Diallo (born 20 March 1994) is a Senegalese professional footballer who plays as a forward for Al-Ittihad.

== Career ==
Born in Kédougou, Sylla moved to Spain in 2004, aged ten, and joined FC Barcelona's youth setup in 2009. He subsequently represented CE Mataró and RCD Espanyol, and made his senior debuts with the latter's reserve team in 2013, in Segunda División B.

On 27 March 2015 Sylla joined Segunda División strugglers Racing de Santander on loan until the end of the campaign, as a short-term replacement to injured Mamadou Koné. He played his first match as a professional on 5 April, starting in a 2–0 home loss against UE Llagostera.

Six days later Sylla scoring his first professional goal, netting a last-minute winner in a 3–2 away win against RCD Mallorca. He returned to the Pericos in June, scoring three goals in 11 appearances but suffering team relegation.

Sylla made his debut in the main category of Spanish football on 27 September 2015, coming on as a second-half substitute for Víctor Sánchez in a 3–0 away loss against Deportivo de La Coruña. On 3 December, he scored his first goal for the team, coming off the bench to open a 1–1 draw at Levante UD in the first leg of the last 16 of that season's Copa del Rey.

On 11 July 2016, Sylla was loaned to Belgian club KAS Eupen for one year. He subsequently joined KAA Gent permanently, but served loan stints at SV Zulte-Waregem and Sint-Truidense VV.

On 5 January 2020, Sylla signed with Russian Premier League side FC Orenburg on loan until the end of the 2019–20 season. On 9 October, he returned to Spain after joining second division side Girona on a free transfer, signing a two-year contract.

On 20 August 2021, Sylla agreed to a three-year deal with La Liga side Deportivo Alavés. The following 31 January, he moved to fellow league team Rayo Vallecano on loan for the remainder of the season.

Back to the Babazorros for the 2022–23 season, Sylla scored four times as the club returned to the top tier at first attempt. On 1 September 2023, he terminated his contract with the club, and signed a one-year deal with Real Valladolid just hours later.

On 23 August 2025, Sylla joined Saudi Pro League club Al-Riyadh. During the 2025–26 season with Al Riyadh, Sylla made 32 appearances across all competitions, scoring 10 goals and providing two assists. In June 2026, following the conclusion of the season, it was announced that Al Riyadh would not extend his contract as part of an offensive squad restructuring, making Sylla a free agent for the summer transfer window.

== Career statistics ==
As of match played on 1 July 2024

Appearances and goals by club, season and competition
Club	Season	League			National cup (Note: Includes Copa del Rey, Belgian Cup)		Other		Total	
Club	Season	Division	Apps	Goals	Apps	Goals	Apps	Goals	Apps	Goals
Espanyol B	2012–13	Segunda División B	1	0	—		—		1	0
Espanyol B	2013–14	Segunda División B	33	6	—		—		33	6
Espanyol B	2014–14	Segunda División B	30	9	—		—		30	9
Espanyol B	Total		64	15	0	0	0	0	64	15
Racing Santander (loan)	2014–15	Segunda División	11	3	0	0	—		11	3
Espanyol	2015–16	La Liga	14	0	3	1	—		17	1
Eupen (loan)	2016–17	Belgian First Division A	35	12	4	1	—		39	13
Gent	2017–18	Belgian First Division A	28	1	2	1	2 (Note: Appearances in the UEFA Europa League)	0	32	2
Gent	2019–20	Belgian First Division A	1	0	1	0	1	0	3	0
Gent	Total		29	1	3	1	3	0	35	2
Zulte Waregem (loan)	2018–19	Belgian First Division A	14	1	2	0	—		16	1
Sint-Truiden (loan)	2018–19	Belgian First Division A	13	4	0	0	—		13	4
Orenburg (loan)	2019–20	Russian Premier League	5	0	0	0	—		5	0
Girona	2020–21	Segunda División	36	9	2	0	4 (Note: Appearances in the 2021 Segunda División play-offs)	2	42	11
Girona	2021–22	Segunda División	1	0	0	0	—		1	0
Girona	Total		37	9	2	0	4	2	43	11
Alavés	2021–22	La Liga	13	0	2	2	—		15	2
Alavés	2022–23	Segunda División	19	4	3	1	4 (Note: Appearances in the 2023 Segunda División play-offs)	1	26	6
Alavés	2023–24	La Liga	2	0	0	0	—		2	0
Alavés	Total		34	4	5	3	4	1	43	8
Rayo Vallecano (loan)	2021–22	La Liga	12	0	2	0	—		14	0
Valladolid	2023–24	Segunda División	29	8	0	0	—		29	8
Valladolid	2024–25	La Liga	0	0	0	0	—		0	0
Valladolid	Total		29	8	0	0	—		29	8
Career total			297	57	21	6	11	3	329	66
