= Kike Pérez =

Spanish footballer (born 1997)

Personal information
- Full name: Enrique Pérez Muñoz
- Date of birth: 14 February 1997 (age 29)
- Place of birth: Gálvez, Spain
- Height: 1.84 m (6 ft 0 in)
- Position: Midfielder

Team information
- Current team: Venezia
- Number: 71

Youth career
- 2010–2013: Odelot Toletum
- 2013–2019: Rayo Vallecano

Senior career*
Years	Team	Apps	(Gls)
2015–2017	Rayo Vallecano B	46	(2)
2017–2019	Lugo	0	(0)
2017–2018	→ Cerceda (loan)	29	(5)
2018–2019	→ Valladolid B (loan)	35	(2)
2019–2020	Valladolid B	25	(2)
2020–2025	Valladolid	99	(4)
2022	→ Elche (loan)	12	(2)
2023–2024	→ Rayo Vallecano (loan)	24	(1)
2025–	Venezia	62	(5)

International career
2015	Spain U18	2	(1)
2015	Spain U19	1	(0)
- * Club domestic league appearances and goals as of 08:26, 7 November 2026 (UTC)

Enrique "Kike" Pérez Muñoz (born 14 February 1997) is a Spanish professional footballer who plays as a midfielder for Serie A club Venezia.

== Club career ==
Born in Gálvez, Toledo, Castilla–La Mancha, Pérez joined Rayo Vallecano's youth setup in 2013, from EFB Odelot Toletum. He made his senior debut with the reserves on 30 August 2015, starting in a 1–1 Tercera División away draw against CDA Navalcarnero.

Pérez scored his first senior goal on 11 September 2016, scoring his team's second in a 5–0 home routing of Alcobendas CF. The following 9 August, he signed a two-year contract with Segunda División side CD Lugo, being immediately loaned to farm team CCD Cerceda for one year.

On 4 August 2018, Pérez was loaned to Real Valladolid's reserves for one year. On 14 June of the following year, he signed a permanent four-year contract with the Blanquivioletas.

Pérez made his first team – and La Liga – debut on 20 June 2020, coming on as a second-half substitute for Matheus Fernandes in a 1–0 loss at Atlético Madrid. On 11 August, he renewed his contract until 2025 and was definitely promoted to the main squad.

Pérez scored his first professional goal on 3 December 2021, netting his team's second in a 3–2 away loss against SD Huesca in the Segunda División. The following 1 February, he was loaned to Elche CF back in the top tier, with a buyout clause.

Upon returning to Valladolid, Pérez became an undisputed starter as the club suffered relegation. On 10 August 2023, he was loaned to Rayo Vallecano in the first division, for one year.

On 29 January 2025, Pérez signed a two-and-a-half-year contract with Venezia in Serie A.

== Career statistics ==
As of match played 6 November 2026

Appearances and goals by club, season and competition
Club	Season	League			Cup		Total	
Club	Season	Division	Apps	Goals	Apps	Goals	Apps	Goals
Cerceda (loan)	2017–18	Segunda División B	29	5	0	0	29	5
Real Valladolid B	2018–19	Segunda División B	35	2	0	0	35	2
Real Valladolid B	2019–20	Segunda División B	25	2	1	0	26	2
Real Valladolid B	Total		50	4	1	0	61	4
Real Valladolid	2019–20	La Liga	6	0	0	0	6	0
Real Valladolid	2020–21	La Liga	24	0	3	0	27	0
Real Valladolid	2021–22	Segunda División	14	1	3	0	17	1
Real Valladolid	2022–23	La Liga	36	1	3	1	39	2
Real Valladolid	2024–25	La Liga	19	2	3	2	22	4
Real Valladolid	Total		99	4	12	3	111	7
Elche (loan)	2021–22	La Liga	12	2	—		12	2
Rayo Vallecano (loan)	2023–24	La Liga	24	1	2	0	26	1
Venezia	2024–25	Serie A	16	1	0	0	16	1
Venezia	2025–26	Serie B	35	3	3	0	38	3
Venezia	2026–27	Serie A	11	1	1	0	12	1
Venezia	Total		62	5	4	0	66	5
Career total			286	21	19	3	305	24
