= Víctor Meseguer =

Spanish footballer (born 1999)

Personal information
- Full name: Víctor Andrés Meseguer Cavas
- Date of birth: 9 June 1999 (age 27)
- Place of birth: Alguazas, Spain
- Height: 1.84 m (6 ft 0 in)
- Position: Midfielder

Team information
- Current team: Wisła Kraków
- Number: 23

Youth career
- 2017–2018: Murcia

Senior career*
Years	Team	Apps	(Gls)
2018–2019	Murcia B	47	(6)
2019–2020	Murcia	19	(2)
2020–2022	Mirandés	76	(6)
2022–2024	Granada	23	(0)
2023–2024	→ Valladolid (loan)	33	(6)
2024–2026	Valladolid	43	(3)
2025	→ Racing Santander (loan)	18	(0)
2026–	Wisła Kraków	1	(0)
- * Club domestic league appearances and goals as of 20:22, 5 October 2026 (UTC)

Víctor Andrés Meseguer Cavas (born 9 June 1999) is a Spanish professional footballer who plays as a midfielder for Ekstraklasa club Wisła Kraków.

== Career ==
Meseguer was born in Alguazas, Region of Murcia, and joined Real Murcia in 2017, for the Juvenil A squad. He made his senior debut with the reserves on 11 February 2018, playing the last three minutes of a 3–1 Tercera División away loss against UCAM Murcia CF B. He scored his first senior goal on 11 November, netting the opener in a 1–1 home draw against the same opponent.

Meseguer made his first team debut for Murcia on 24 March 2019, coming on as a late substitute for fellow youth graduate Juanma Bravo in a 2–1 away win against Club Recreativo Granada in the Segunda División B. On 4 July, he renewed his contract with the club, and subsequently began to feature regularly for the main squad during the season, contributing with two goals in 20 appearances overall.

On 1 September 2020, Meseguer agreed to a three-year contract with Segunda División side CD Mirandés. He made his professional debut twelve days later, starting in a 0–0 home draw against AD Alcorcón.

Meseguer scored his first professional goal on 2 January 2021, netting the equalizer in a 2–1 loss at UD Logroñés. He finished the season as an undisputed starter, scoring three goals in 38 appearances.

On 10 August 2022, Meseguer signed a five-year contract with Granada CF, freshly relegated to the second division. He helped the club return to La Liga at first attempt, but was loaned to fellow second-level side Real Valladolid on 16 August 2023.

After also helping the Pucelanos to a top tier promotion, Meseguer signed a permanent five-year contract with the club on 30 May 2024. He made his debut in the category on 19 August, playing the last 20 minutes in a 1–0 home win over RCD Espanyol.

On 9 January 2025, Meseguer returned to the second division after being loaned to Racing de Santander until June. Upon returning to Valladolid, he featured regularly for the side now also in division two, before terminating his link on 27 August 2026.

On 29 August 2026, Meseguer signed a two-year deal with Polish Ekstraklasa club Wisła Kraków.

== Honours ==
Granada

- Segunda División: 2022–23
