= Anuar Tuhami =

Moroccan footballer (born 1995

Anuar Tuhami أنور التهامي
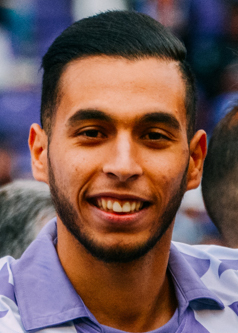
- Anuar with Valladolid in 2019

Personal information
- Full name: Anuar Mohamed Tuhami
- Date of birth: 15 January 1995 (age 31)
- Place of birth: Ceuta, Spain
- Height: 1.74 m (5 ft 9 in)
- Position: Central midfielder

Team information
- Current team: Ceuta
- Number: 23

Youth career
- 2008–2012: Valladolid

Senior career*
| Years | Team | Apps | (Gls) |
| 2012–2017 | Valladolid B | 132 | (2) |
| 2014–2025 | Valladolid | 142 | (10) |
| 2020 | → Panathinaikos (loan) | 7 | (0) |
| 2020–2021 | → APOEL (loan) | 16 | (0) |
| 2025– | Ceuta | 27 | (0) |

International career^{‡}
| 2019– | Morocco | 2 | (0) |
- * Club domestic league appearances and goals as of 9 June 2026 ‡ National team caps and goals as of 10 September 2019

Anuar Mohamed Tuhami (Arabic: أنور محمد التهامي; born 15 January 1995), simply known as Anuar, is a professional footballer who plays for Segunda División club Ceuta. Mainly a central midfielder, he can also play as a right-back.

Born in Spain, Anuar represents Morocco at international level.

== Club career ==
Born in Ceuta, Anuar finished his formation at Real Valladolid, and made his senior debuts with the reserves in the 2012–13 campaign in Tercera División, aged only 17.

Anuar made his first-team debut on 15 October 2014, replacing Álvaro Rubio in the 77th minute of a 2–0 home win over Girona for the season's Copa del Rey. He made his Segunda División debut on 1 May 2016, coming on as a substitute for Vincenzo Rennella in a 1–1 home draw against Lugo.

On 12 November 2017, after becoming a regular starter under new manager Luis César Sampedro, Anuar renewed his contract until 2020. He scored his first professional goal on 19 December, netting the first in a 3–2 home win against Real Zaragoza.

Anuar contributed with one goal in 29 appearances (play-offs included) as his side achieved promotion to La Liga. He made his debut in the main category of Spanish football on 17 August 2018, starting in a 0–0 away draw against Girona.

On 13 January 2020, Anuar joined Super League Greece side Panathinaikos on a six-month loan contract. On 7 September, he switched teams and countries again after agreeing to a one-year loan deal with APOEL of the Cypriot First Division.

Back to Valladolid in July 2022, Anuar featured regularly (although mostly from the bench) as the club returned to the top tier, and renewed his contract until 2025 on 9 June 2023. Unable to establish himself as a first-choice in the following years, he refused a renewal offer from the club in May 2025, stating his intention to leave upon the expiration of his deal.

On 27 June 2025, Anuar joined hometown side Ceuta in the second division.

== International career ==
Born in Spain, Anuar is Moroccan by descent. He represented the Morocco national football team in a 1–1 friendly tie with Burkina Faso on 6 September 2019.

== Career statistics ==
=== Club ===
As of match played 9 September 2022

Appearances and goals by club, season and competition
| Club | Season | League | | | Cup | | Europe | | Other | | Total | |
| Club | Season | Division | Apps | Goals | Apps | Goals | Apps | Goals | Apps | Goals | Apps | Goals |
|---|---|---|---|---|---|---|---|---|---|---|---|---|
| Real Valladolid B | 2014–15 | Segunda División B | 37 | 0 | — | | — | | — | | 37 | 0 |
| Real Valladolid B | 2015–16 | Segunda División B | 28 | 0 | — | | — | | — | | 28 | 0 |
| Real Valladolid B | 2016–17 | Segunda División B | 29 | 1 | — | | — | | — | | 29 | 1 |
| Real Valladolid B | Total | | 94 | 1 | — | | — | | — | | 94 | 1 |
| Real Valladolid | 2014–15 | La Liga | 0 | 0 | 1 | 0 | — | | — | | 1 | 0 |
| Real Valladolid | 2015–16 | Segunda División | 1 | 0 | 0 | 0 | — | | — | | 1 | 0 |
| Real Valladolid | 2016–17 | Segunda División | 2 | 0 | 2 | 0 | — | | — | | 2 | 1 |
| Real Valladolid | 2017–18 | Segunda División | 25 | 1 | 2 | 1 | — | | 4 | 0 | 31 | 2 |
| Real Valladolid | 2018–19 | La Liga | 19 | 1 | 4 | 0 | — | | — | | 23 | 1 |
| Real Valladolid | 2019–20 | La Liga | 11 | 0 | 1 | 0 | — | | — | | 12 | 0 |
| Real Valladolid | 2021–22 | Segunda División | 34 | 3 | 3 | 1 | — | | — | | 37 | 4 |
| Real Valladolid | 2022–23 | La Liga | 3 | 1 | 0 | 0 | — | | — | | 3 | 1 |
| Real Valladolid | Total | | 96 | 6 | 13 | 2 | — | | 4 | 0 | 113 | 8 |
| Panathinaikos (loan) | 2019–20 | Super League Greece | 7 | 0 | 1 | 0 | — | | 9 | 0 | 17 | 0 |
| APOEL (loan) | 2020–21 | Cypriot First Division | 16 | 0 | 5 | 1 | 3 | 1 | 8 | 1 | 32 | 3 |
| Career total | | | 213 | 7 | 19 | 3 | 3 | 1 | 21 | 1 | 254 | 13 |
