= David Torres (footballer, born 2003) =

Spanish footballer

Personal information
- Full name: David Torres Ortiz
- Date of birth: 5 March 2003 (age 23)
- Place of birth: Valladolid, Spain
- Height: 1.82 m (6 ft 0 in)
- Position: Centre-back

Team information
- Current team: Valladolid
- Number: 4

Youth career
- Valladolid

Senior career*
Years	Team	Apps	(Gls)
2021–2023	Valladolid B	26	(0)
2022–	Valladolid	86	(1)

International career^{‡}
2021	Spain U19	2	(0)
2023–	Spain U21	1	(0)
- * Club domestic league appearances and goals as of 9 June 2026 ‡ National team caps and goals as of 21 November 2023

David Torres Ortiz (born 5 March 2003) is a Spanish professional footballer who plays as a central defender for Real Valladolid in Segunda División.

== Club career ==
Born in Valladolid, Castile and León, Torres was a Real Valladolid youth graduate. He made his senior debut with the reserves on 25 September 2021, coming on as a late substitute in a 4–2 Primera División RFEF away loss against Cultural y Deportiva Leonesa.

Torres made his first team debut on 12 November 2022, starting in a 2–0 away win over UD Barbadás, for the season's Copa del Rey. His professional debut occurred the following 4 January, as he replaced Juanjo Narváez late into a 1–0 loss at Deportivo Alavés, also for the national cup.

Torres made his first La Liga appearance on 21 January 2023, starting in a 3–0 away loss to Atlético Madrid. On 27 July, after Valladolid's relegation to Segunda División, he renewed his contract until 2026 and was definitely promoted to the main squad.

== International career ==
In September 2021, Torres was called up to the Spain U-19 national team for two friendly matches against Mexico. He made his debut on 3 September, coming on as a substitute in the 78th minute of a 5–1 victory. He started the second match on 5 September, which Spain won 3–2.

== Personal life ==
Torres' father Javier was also a footballer and a defender. He too played for Valladolid.

== Career statistics ==
=== Club ===
As of match played 28 May 2023

Appearances and goals by club, season and competition
Club	Season	League			Cup		Europe		Other		Total	
Club	Season	Division	Apps	Goals	Apps	Goals	Apps	Goals	Apps	Goals	Apps	Goals
Valladolid B	2021–22	Primera Federación	12	0	—		—		—		12	0
Valladolid B	2022–23	Segunda Federación	14	0	—		—		—		14	0
Valladolid B	Total		26	0	—		—		—		26	0
Valladolid	2022–23	La Liga	6	0	2	0	—		—		8	0
Career total			32	0	2	0	—		—		34	0
