= 2015–16 UD Almería season =

UD Almería
2015–16 season
- President: Alfonso García
- Head coach: Fernando Soriano
- Stadium: Juegos Mediterráneos
- Segunda División: 18th
- Copa del Rey: 16th finals
- Top goalscorer: League: Quique González (15); All: Quique González (16)
- Highest home attendance: 9,952 vs. Oviedo (22 May)
- Lowest home attendance: 6,485 vs. Lugo (13 Feb)
Home colours	Away colours

The 2015–16 season was UD Almería's twentieth sixth season of existence and the first in Segunda División since suffering relegation in the last round of the 2014–15 La Liga. The club returned to the second tier after a two-year absence.

== Squad ==
As of 4 June 2016

No.	Name	Pos.	Nat.	Place of Birth	Date of Birth (Age)	Club caps	Club goals	Int. caps	Int. goals	Signed from	Date signed	Fee	Contract End
Goalkeepers
1	Julián Cuesta	GK	(Spain) (Andalusia)	Campotéjar	28 March 1991 (aged 25)	29	0	–	–	Sevilla	6 June 2014	Undisc.	30 June 2017
13	Casto	GK	(Spain) (Extremadura)	P. del Guadiana	12 June 1982 (aged 33)	36	0	–	–	Las Palmas	2 July 2015	Free	30 June 2017
30	Yeray	GK	(Spain) (Catalonia)	Selva	10 June 1992 (aged 23)	–	–	–	–	Almería B	19 December 2014	Free	30 June 2017
Defenders
2	Michel Macedo	RB	(Brazil)	Rio de Janeiro (Rio de Janeiro (state))	15 February 1990 (aged 26)	140	4	–	–	Flamengo (Brazil)	23 June 2008	Undisc.	30 June 2016
3	Fran Vélez	CB/LB/DM	(Spain) (Catalonia)	Tarragona	13 June 1991 (aged 24)	54	1	–	–	Almería B	13 January 2014	Free	30 June 2018
4	Ximo Navarro	RB/CB	(Spain) (Andalusia)	Guadahortuna	23 January 1990 (aged 26)	51	1	–	–	Mallorca	12 June 2014	Free	30 June 2017
5	Carlos Cuéllar	CB/RB	(Spain) (Community of Madrid)	Madrid	23 August 1981 (aged 34)	18	0	–	–	Norwich (England)	10 August 2015	Free	30 June 2016
6	Esteban Saveljich	CB	(Montenegro)	Tandil (Argentina)	20 May 1991 (aged 25)	17	1	3	0	Racing (Argentina)	24 January 2016	Loan	30 June 2016
15	Ernesto Goñi	LB/CB	(Uruguay)	Montevideo	13 January 1985 (aged 31)	2	0	–	–	Tigre (Argentina)	8 January 2016	Free	30 June 2016
16	Sebastián Dubarbier	LB/LW	(Argentina)	La Plata (Buenos Aires Province)	19 February 1986 (aged 30)	89	1	–	–	Córdoba	28 June 2013	Free	30 June 2019
21	Jorge Morcillo	CB/LB	(Spain) (Valencian Community)	Valencia	11 March 1986 (aged 30)	36	3	–	–	Rayo Vallecano	4 July 2015	Free	30 June 2018
27	Charlie Took	CB	(Cameroon)	Douala	25 May 1993 (aged 23)	–	–	–	–	Almería B	14 October 2015	Free	30 June 2016
28	Josema	CB	(Spain) (Region of Murcia)	Lorquí	6 June 1996 (aged 19)	–	–	–	–	Almería B	1 December 2015	Free	30 June 2016
31	Xavi Carmona	RB	(Spain) (Catalonia)	Santa Coloma	21 January 1993 (aged 23)	–	–	–	–	Almería B	14 October 2015	Free	30 June 2016
32	Adri Castellano	LB	(Spain) (Andalusia)	Córdoba	26 June 1994 (aged 21)	6	0	–	–	Almería B	2 September 2015	Free	30 June 2017
Midfielders
7	Iago Díaz	LW/RW/RB	(Spain) (Catalonia)	Barcelona	10 February 1993 (aged 23)	21	2	–	–	Lugo	12 June 2015	Free	30 June 2018
8	Mohammed Fatau	DM/CM	(Ghana)	Accra	24 December 1992 (aged 23)	21	1	–	–	Granada	21 July 2015	Loan	30 June 2016
11	Juan Ramírez	LW/RW	(Argentina)	Moreno	25 May 1993 (aged 23)	15	1	–	–	Colorado Rapids (United States)	24 January 2016	Loan	30 June 2016
18	Ramon Azeez	CM/DM	(Nigeria)	Abuja	12 December 1992 (aged 23)	56	2	4	0	Almería B	28 June 2013	Free	30 June 2016
20	José Ángel	CM	(Spain) (Andalusia)	Seville	21 June 1992 (aged 23)	30	1	–	–	Almería B	14 June 2015	Free	30 June 2019
22	Iván Sánchez	LW/RW	(Spain) (Andalusia)	Jaén	23 September 1992 (aged 23)	27	0	–	–	Almería B	14 June 2015	Free	30 June 2017
25	Lolo Reyes	DM/CM	(Chile)	Talcahuano	13 June 1991 (aged 24)	38	2	4	0	Betis	31 August 2015	Loan	30 June 2016
26	Joaquín	CM/DM	(Spain) (Andalusia)	Huércal de Almería	31 May 1996 (aged 20)	4	0	–	–	Almería B	14 October 2015	Free	30 June 2016
Forwards
9	Quique González	SS/RW/LW	(Spain) (Castile and León)	Valladolid	16 May 1990 (aged 26)	47	17	–	–	Guadalajara	21 May 2014	Free	30 June 2018
10	José Ángel Pozo	ST	(Spain) (Andalusia)	Málaga	15 March 1996 (aged 20)	33	5	–	–	Manchester City (England)	31 August 2015	€500K	30 June 2020
12	Chuli	ST	(Spain) (Andalusia)	Huelva	25 January 1991 (aged 25)	36	6	–	–	Betis	9 July 2015	€500K	30 June 2020
14	Kalu Uche	SS/ST/AM	(Nigeria)	Aba	15 November 1982 (aged 33)	199	43	36	5	Pune City (India)	7 January 2016	Free	30 June 2016
17	Antonio Puertas	ST/RW/LW	(Spain) (Andalusia)	Benahadux	21 February 1992 (aged 24)	14	0	–	–	Almería B	14 June 2015	Free	30 June 2017
19	Jonathan Zongo	ST/RW	(Burkina Faso)	Ouagadougou	6 April 1989 (aged 27)	103	7	15	2	Almería B	1 August 2011	Free	30 June 2017
27	Hicham	ST	(Morocco)	San Javier (Spain)	7 May 1995 (aged 21)	5	1	–	–	Almería B	17 December 2013	Free	30 June 2018

== Coaches ==
Name	Nat.	Place of Birth	Date of Birth (Age)	Signed from	Date signed	Role	Departure	Manner	Contract End
Sergi Barjuán	(Spain) (Catalonia)	Les Franqueses	28 December 1971 (age 54)	Free agent	6 April 2015	Permanent	3 October 2015	Sacked	30 June 2016
Miguel Rivera	(Spain) (Andalusia)	Alhaurín de la Torre	8 May 1961 (age 65)	Almería B	4 October 2015	Interim	19 October 2015	Ended tenure	30 June 2016
Joan Carrillo	(Spain) (Catalonia)	Monistrol	8 September 1968 (age 58)	Free agent	19 October 2015	Permanent	20 December 2015	Sacked	30 June 2016
Néstor Gorosito	(Argentina)	San Fernando (Buenos Aires Province)	14 May 1964 (age 62)	Argentinos Jrs (Argentina)	23 December 2015	Permanent	16 May 2016	Sacked	30 June 2016
Fernando Soriano	(Spain) (Aragon)	Zaragoza	24 September 1979 (age 47)	Player	17 May 2016	Permanent			30 June 2016

=== Staff members ===
Name	Staff role
Jesús Roche	Fitness coach
Ángel Férez	Goalkeeping coach
Pepe Morales	Scout
Antonio Ríos	Doctor
Fran Simón	Physio
Pedro Serrano	Physio
Alberto Benito	Director of football

Source: UD Almería's official website

== Transfers ==
=== In ===
No.	Pos.	Nat.	Name	Age	EU	Moving from	Type	Transfer window	Ends	Transfer fee	Source
9	FW	(Spain)	Quique González	25	EU	Racing Santander	Loan Return	Summer	2018	Free	
7	MF	(Spain)	Iago Díaz	22	EU	Lugo	Transfer	Summer	2018	Free	
14	DF	(Spain)	Míchel Zabaco	26	EU	Almería B	Promoted	Summer	2017	Free	
20	MF	(Spain)	José Ángel	22	EU	Almería B	Promoted	Summer	2019	Free	
22	MF	(Spain)	Iván Sánchez	22	EU	Almería B	Promoted	Summer	2017	Free	
17	FW	(Spain)	Antonio Puertas	23	EU	Almería B	Promoted	Summer	2017	Free	
29	MF	(Spain)	Cristóbal	23	EU	Gimnàstic	Loan Return	Summer	2016	Free	
18	DF	(Spain)	Antonio Marín	19	EU	Almería B	Promoted	Summer	2019	Free	
6	MF	(Spain)	Ángel Montoro	27	EU	Recreativo de Huelva	Transfer	Summer	2016	Free	
11	MF	(Bosnia and Herzegovina)	Eldin Hadžić	23	EU	Zaragoza	Transfer	Summer	2016	Free	
13	GK	(Spain)	Casto	33	EU	Las Palmas	Transfer	Summer	2017	Free	
21	DF	(Spain)	Jorge Morcillo	29	EU	Rayo Vallecano	Transfer	Summer	2018	Free	
12	FW	(Spain)	Chuli	24	EU	Betis	Transfer	Summer	2020	€500K	
8	MF	(Ghana)	Mohammed Fatau	22	EU	Granada	Loan	Summer	2016	Free	
5	DF	(Spain)	Carlos Cuéllar	33	EU	Norwich City (England)	Transfer	Summer	2016	Free	
24	FW	(Spain)	Cristian Herrera	24	EU	Elche	Transfer	Summer	2016	Free	
25	MF	(Chile)	Lolo Reyes	24	Non-EU	Betis	Loan	Summer	2016	Free	
10	FW	(Spain)	José Ángel Pozo	19	EU	Manchester City (England)	Transfer	Summer	2020	€500K	
		(Spain)	Joan Carrillo	47	EU	Free agent	Job Offer	During season	2016	Free	
		(Argentina)	Néstor Gorosito	51	EU	Argentinos Juniors (Argentina)	Job Offer	During season	2016	Free	
14	FW	(Nigeria)	Kalu Uche	33	EU	Pune City (India)	Transfer	Winter	2016	Free	
15	DF	(Uruguay)	Ernesto Goñi	30	EU	Tigre (Argentina)	Transfer	Winter	2016	Free	
6	DF	(Montenegro)	Esteban Saveljich	24	EU	Racing Club (Argentina)	Loan	Winter	2016	Free	
11	MF	(Argentina)	Juan Ramírez	22	Non-EU	Colorado Rapids (United States)	Loan	Winter	2016	Free	
18	MF	(Nigeria)	Ramon Azeez	23	EU	Almería B	Promoted	Winter	Undisclosed	Free	
		(Spain)	Fernando Soriano	36	EU	Almería	Job Offer	During season	2016	Free	

Total spending: ▼€1,000,000

=== Out ===
No.	Pos.	Nat.	Name	Age	EU	Moving to	Type	Transfer window	Transfer fee	Source
24	MF	(Spain)	Javier Espinosa	22	EU	Villarreal	Loan Return	Summer	Free	
22	MF	(Ghana)	Thomas Partey	21	EU	Atlético Madrid	Loan Return	Summer	Free	
8	MF	(Brazil)	Wellington Silva	22	EU	Arsenal (England)	Loan Return	Summer	Free	
9	FW	(Republic of the Congo)	Thievy Bifouma	23	EU	Espanyol	Loan Return	Summer	Free	
25	GK	(Spain)	Rubén	30	EU	Levante	Contract Ended	Summer	Free	
6	DF	(Argentina)	Mauro dos Santos	25	Non-EU	Free agent	Contract Ended	Summer	Free	
14	DF	(Spain)	José Manuel Casado	28	EU	Free agent	Rescinded	Summer	Free	
21	DF	(Spain)	Mané	33	EU	Free agent	Contract Ended	Summer	Free	
7	MF	(Spain)	Verza	28	EU	Levante	Contract Ended	Summer	Free	
10	FW	(Israel)	Tomer Hemed	28	EU	Brighton & Hove Albion (England)	Transfer	Summer	€1M	
17	MF	(Spain)	Édgar Méndez	24	EU	Granada	Transfer	Summer	€800K	
5	DF	(Spain)	Ángel Trujillo	27	EU	Levante	Transfer	Summer	€1M	
29	MF	(Spain)	Cristóbal	23	EU	Cultural Leonesa	Contract Rescinded	Summer	Free	
28	FW	(Spain)	Dani Romera	20	EU	Barcelona B	Transfer	During Season	Undisclosed	
15	MF	(Spain)	Corona	34	EU	Brisbane Roar (Australia)	Contract Rescinded	During Season	Free	
		(Spain)	Sergi Barjuán	43	EU	Free agent	Contract Rescinded	During Season	Free	
		(Spain)	Joan Carrillo	47	EU	Free agent	Contract Rescinded	During Season	Free	
6	MF	(Spain)	Ángel Montoro	27	EU	Las Palmas	Contract Rescinded	Winter	Free	
11	MF	(Bosnia and Herzegovina)	Eldin Hadžić	24	EU	Elche	Contract Rescinded	Winter	Free	
	DF	(Spain)	Míchel Zabaco	26	EU	Cultural Leonesa	Loan	Winter	Free	
24	FW	(Spain)	Cristian Herrera	24	EU	Girona	Contract Rescinded	Winter	Free	
		(Argentina)	Néstor Gorosito	52	EU	Free agent	Contract Rescinded	During Season	Free	

Total gaining: ▲€2,800,000

Balance

Total: ▲€1,800,000

=== Contracts ===
No.	Pos.	Nat.	Name	Age	Status	Contract length	Expiry date	Source
		(Spain)	Sergi Barjuán	43	Signed	1 year	June 2016	UD Almería
15	MF	(Spain)	Corona	34	Signed	1 year	June 2016	UD Almería
23	MF	(Spain)	Fernando Soriano	35	Signed	1 year	June 2016	UD Almería
18	DF	(Spain)	Antonio Marín	19	Signed	4 years	June 2019	UD Almería
16	DF	(Argentina)	Sebastián Dubarbier	29	Signed	4 years	June 2019	UD Almería

== Player statistics ==
=== Squad stats ===
As of 4 June 2016

No.	Pos	Nat	Player	Total		Segunda División		Copa del Rey	
No.	Pos	Nat	Player	Apps	Goals	Apps	Goals	Apps	Goals
1	GK	(Spain) ESP	Julián Cuesta	10	0	6	0	4	0
2	DF	(Brazil) BRA	Michel Macedo	29	0	28	0	1	0
3	DF	(Spain) ESP	Fran Vélez	32	0	24+6	0	2	0
4	DF	(Spain) ESP	Ximo Navarro	25	1	23+1	1	0+1	0
5	DF	(Spain) ESP	Carlos Cuéllar	19	0	16+1	0	2	0
6	DF	(Montenegro) MNE	Esteban Saveljich	17	1	17	1	0	0
7	MF	(Spain) ESP	Iago Díaz	21	2	16+4	2	1	0
8	MF	(Ghana) GHA	Mohammed Fatau	21	1	16+2	1	2+1	0
9	FW	(Spain) ESP	Quique González	40	16	37+2	15	0+1	1
10	FW	(Spain) ESP	José Ángel Pozo	33	5	15+14	4	4	1
11	MF	(Argentina) ARG	Juan Ramírez	15	1	11+4	1	0	0
12	FW	(Spain) ESP	Chuli	36	6	20+16	6	0	0
13	GK	(Spain) ESP	Casto	36	0	36	0	0	0
14	FW	(Nigeria) NGR	Kalu Uche	15	3	6+9	3	0	0
15	DF	(Uruguay) URU	Ernesto Goñi	2	0	2	0	0	0
16	DF	(Argentina) ARG	Sebastián Dubarbier	32	0	31	0	1	0
17	FW	(Spain) ESP	Antonio Puertas	14	0	4+7	0	2+1	0
18	MF	(Nigeria) NGR	Ramon Azeez	3	0	2+1	0	0	0
19	FW	(Burkina Faso) BFA	Jonathan Zongo	13	0	10+2	0	0+1	0
20	MF	(Spain) ESP	José Ángel	28	1	20+5	1	3	0
21	DF	(Spain) ESP	Jorge Morcillo	36	3	33+2	3	0+1	0
22	MF	(Spain) ESP	Iván Sánchez	25	0	12+12	0	1	0
25	MF	(Chile) CHI	Lolo Reyes	39	2	33+3	2	3	0
26	MF	(Spain) ESP	Joaquín	4	0	0+2	0	1+1	0
27	DF	(Cameroon) CMR	Charlie Took	0	0	0	0	0	0
28	DF	(Spain) ESP	Josema	0	0	0	0	0	0
29	FW	(Morocco) MAR	Hicham	1	0	0	0	0+1	0
31	DF	(Spain) ESP	Xavi Carmona	0	0	0	0	0	0
32	DF	(Spain) ESP	Adri Castellano	6	0	3	0	2+1	0
Players on loan to other clubs:
—	DF	(Spain) ESP	Míchel Zabaco	6	0	3	0	3	0
Players who have left the club after the start of the season:
6	MF	(Spain) ESP	Ángel Montoro	16	0	10+4	0	0+2	0
11	MF	(Bosnia and Herzegovina) BIH	Eldin Hadžić	14	1	7+5	1	2	0
15	MF	(Spain) ESP	Corona	3	0	3	0	0	0
18	DF	(Spain) ESP	Antonio Marín	9	0	4+1	0	4	0
23	MF	(Spain) ESP	Fernando Soriano	26	2	11+12	0	3	2
24	FW	(Spain) ESP	Cristian Herrera	13	2	2+7	0	4	2
28	FW	(Spain) ESP	Dani Romera	0	0	0	0	0	0

=== Top scorers ===
Place	Position	Nation	Number	Name	Segunda División	Copa del Rey	Total
1	FW	(Spain)	9	Quique González	15	1	16
2	FW	(Spain)	12	Chuli	6	0	6
3	FW	(Spain)	10	José Ángel Pozo	4	1	5
4	FW	(Nigeria)	14	Kalu Uche	3	0	3
4	DF	(Spain)	21	Jorge Morcillo	3	0	3
5	MF	(Spain)	7	Iago Díaz	2	0	2
5	MF	(Chile)	25	Lolo Reyes	2	0	2
5	MF	(Spain)	23	Fernando Soriano	0	2	2
5	FW	(Spain)	24	Cristian Herrera	0	2	2
6	DF	(Spain)	4	Ximo Navarro	1	0	1
6	DF	(Montenegro)	6	Esteban Saveljich	1	0	1
6	MF	(Ghana)	8	Mohammed Fatau	1	0	1
6	MF	(Argentina)	11	Juan Ramírez	1	0	1
6	MF	(Bosnia and Herzegovina)	11	Eldin Hadžić	1	0	1
6	MF	(Spain)	20	José Ángel	1	0	1
	Own goals				3	0	3
				TOTALS	44	6	50

=== Disciplinary record ===
Number	Nation	Position	Name	Segunda División		Copa del Rey		Total	
Number	Nation	Position	Name	Yellow card	Red card	Yellow card	Red card	Yellow card	Red card
21	(Spain)	DF	Jorge Morcillo	16	0	0	0	16	0
25	(Chile)	MF	Lolo Reyes	14	1	1	0	15	1
16	(Argentina)	DF	Sebastián Dubarbier	14	1	0	0	14	1
20	(Spain)	MF	José Ángel	10	0	1	0	11	0
8	(Ghana)	MF	Mohammed Fatau	8	0	3	0	11	0
6	(Spain)	MF	Ángel Montoro	9	0	0	0	9	0
12	(Spain)	FW	Chuli	9	0	0	0	9	0
3	(Spain)	DF	Fran Vélez	7	1	1	0	8	1
2	(Brazil)	DF	Michel Macedo	7	0	0	0	7	0
6	(Montenegro)	DF	Esteban Saveljich	6	1	0	0	6	1
4	(Spain)	DF	Ximo Navarro	6	0	0	0	6	0
23	(Spain)	MF	Fernando Soriano	5	1	0	0	5	1
5	(Spain)	DF	Carlos Cuéllar	4	0	1	0	5	0
7	(Spain)	MF	Iago Díaz	4	0	0	0	4	0
13	(Spain)	GK	Casto	4	0	0	0	4	0
9	(Spain)	FW	Quique González	2	1	0	0	2	1
14	(Spain)	DF	Míchel Zabaco	1	1	1	0	2	1
15	(Spain)	MF	Corona	2	0	0	0	2	0
32	(Spain)	DF	Adri Castellano	2	0	0	0	2	0
10	(Spain)	FW	José Ángel Pozo	1	0	0	0	1	0
11	(Argentina)	MF	Juan Ramírez	1	0	0	0	1	0
18	(Spain)	DF	Antonio Marín	1	0	0	0	1	0
24	(Spain)	FW	Cristian Herrera	1	0	0	0	1	0
			TOTALS	138	7	8	1	146	8

== Competitions ==
=== Pre-season/Friendlies ===
18 July 2015	Águilas	0 – 2	Almería	Águilas
21:00		Report	17' Cristóbal; 82' Chuli	Stadium: El Rubial; Referee: Martínez Montalván

24 July 2015	Toledo	2 – 3	Almería	Toledo
21:00	Héctor 3'; Dubarbier 31' (o.g.)	Report	80' Iván Sánchez; 83' 86' Dani Romera	Stadium: Salto del Caballo; Attendance: 2,000; Referee: Montero de Lerma

28 July 2015	AFE XI	1 – 1	Almería	Gijón
19:30	Collado 58'	Report	43' Antonio Puertas	Stadium: Mareo; Referee: Corujo Morán

1 August 2015	Sporting Gijón	1 – 1	Almería	Luanco
19:00	Guerrero 53'	Report	74' Chuli	Stadium: Miramar; Attendance: 2,000; Referee: Fernández Pérez

3 August 2015	Bilbao Athletic	0 – 2	Almería	Grado
18:45		Report	78' Míchel Zabaco; 83' Iago Díaz	Stadium: Marqués de la Vega de Anzo; Referee: Areces Franco

9 August 2015	Almería	2 – 0	Las Palmas	Almería
20:45	Fatau 27'; Iván Sánchez 74'	Report		Stadium: Juegos Mediterráneos; Attendance: 5,432; Referee: José Luis Munuera Montero

12 August 2015	Almería	4 – 0	Almería B	Almería
19:00	Corona; Chuli; Iago Díaz	Report		Stadium: Juegos Mediterráneos

15 August 2015 Trofeo Festa d'Elx	Elche	0 – 1	Almería	Elche
20:00	Pelayo (red card) 26'; Armando (yellow card)	Report	54' (yellow card) Montoro; (yellow card) Dubarbier	Stadium: Martínez Valero; Attendance: 5,000; Referee: Alberola Rojas

=== Segunda División ===
Pos	Team	Pld	W	D	L	GF	GA	GD	Pts	Promotion, qualification or relegation
16	Valladolid	42	12	15	15	47	52	−5	51	
17	Mallorca	42	12	13	17	39	45	−6	49	
18	Almería	42	10	18	14	44	51	−7	48	
19	Ponferradina (R)	42	12	11	19	39	54	−15	47	Relegation to Segunda División B
20	Llagostera (R)	42	12	8	22	44	54	−10	44	Relegation to Segunda División B

Source: LFP
Rules for classification: 1) points; 2) head-to-head points; 3) head-to-head goal difference; 4) goal difference; 5) number of goals scored
(R) Relegated

==== Results summary ====
Overall								Home						Away					
Pld	W	D	L	GF	GA	GD	Pts	W	D	L	GF	GA	GD	W	D	L	GF	GA	GD
42	10	18	14	44	51	−7	48	9	6	6	30	28	+2	1	12	8	14	23	−9

Last updated: 4 June 2016.
Source: Competitive matches

==== Results by round ====
Round	1	2	3	4	5	6	7	8	9	10	11	12	13	14	15	16	17	18	19	20	21	22	23	24	25	26	27	28	29	30	31	32	33	34	35	36	37	38	39	40	41	42
Ground	H	A	H	A	H	A	H	A	H	A	H	A	H	A	H	A	H	A	H	A	H	A	H	A	H	A	H	A	H	A	H	A	H	A	H	A	H	A	H	A	H	A
Result	W	L	W	L	L	L	D	D	L	L	D	D	D	D	D	D	L	L	W	D	L	L	W	D	L	D	W	D	W	D	D	D	D	W	W	L	L	L	W	D	W	D
Position	6	10	6	9	16	19	20	20	21	22	22	21	22	22	22	21	22	22	20	20	20	20	20	20	20	20	20	19	18	19	19	19	19	18	16	18	18	19	18	19	18	18

Updated to match(es) played on 4 June 2016. Source:
A = Away; H = Home; W = Win; D = Draw; L = Loss

==== Matches ====
23 August 2015 1	Almería	3 – 2	Leganés	Almería
20:30	Iago Díaz 2' 25'; Quique 7'; Fatau (yellow card) 44'; Fran Vélez (yellow card) 53'; Casto (yellow card) 62'	Report	(yellow card) 16' Alberto; (yellow card) 41' Omar; (yellow card) 69' Sastre; 71' Paco Candela; (yellow card) 83' Borja Lázaro; 90+2' Guillermo	Stadium: Juegos Mediterráneos; Attendance: 8,801; Referee: Arcediano Monescillo

29 August 2015 2	Zaragoza	3 – 2	Almería	Zaragoza
22:30	Wilk 33' (yellow card) 38'; Aria (yellow card) 52'; Ángel 66' (yellow card) 71'; Rico (yellow card) 77'; Cabrera 90+2'	Report	(yellow card) 7' Montoro; 35' Morcillo; 56' Quique; (yellow card) 90+2' Soriano; (yellow card) 90+3' Michel	Stadium: La Romareda; Attendance: 13,996; Referee: Pizarro Gómez

6 September 2015 3	Almería	2 – 1	Osasuna	Almería
19:15	Chuli 63'; Pozo 88'	Report	(yellow card) 27' Nino; 39' Pučko; (yellow card) 61' Merino; (yellow card) 63' Oier; (yellow card) 90+2' David García	Stadium: Juegos Mediterráneos; Attendance: 9,299; Referee: Medié Jiménez

13 September 2015 4	Lugo	1 – 0	Almería	Lugo
17:00	Carlos Hernández (yellow card) 12' (goal) 57'; Iriome (yellow card) 36'; Pau Cendrós (yellow card) 78'	Report	(yellow card) 9' Cristian Herrera; (yellow card) 38' Fran Vélez; (yellow card) 54' Corona; (yellow card) 88' Adri Castellano	Stadium: Anxo Carro; Attendance: 3,704; Referee: Cordero Vega

20 September 2015 5	Almería	0 – 2	Alavés	Almería
17:00	Fran Vélez (yellow card) 19'; Dubarbier (yellow card) 27' (red card) 47'; Lolo Reyes (yellow card) 44'; Michel (yellow card) 55'; Montoro (yellow card) 59'; Corona (yellow card) 68'; Chuli (yellow card) 82'	Report	8' Raúl García; (yellow card) 23' Sergio Mora; (yellow card) 36' Guichón; (yellow card) 40' Dani Estrada; (yellow card) 83' Manu Barreiro; 90' Toquero	Stadium: Juegos Mediterráneos; Attendance: 8,538; Referee: Areces Franco

27 September 2015 6	Albacete	3 – 0	Almería	Albacete
19:15	Samu 1'; Portu 39'; Jona (yellow card) 53'; Miguel Núñez (yellow card) 60'; Edu Ramos (yellow card) 65'; Paredes (yellow card) 74'; César Díaz 78'; Antoñito (yellow card) 90+2'	Report	(yellow card) 15' Morcillo; (yellow card) 52' Cuéllar; (yellow card) 63' Casto; (yellow card) 90' Fatau	Stadium: Carlos Belmonte; Attendance: 7,620; Referee: Pablo González

3 October 2015 7	Almería	2 – 2	Tenerife	Almería
18:00	Dubarbier (yellow card) 38'; Alberto 59' (o.g.); Chuli 66'; Michel (yellow card) 83'	Report	21' Nano; (yellow card) 24' Cristian; (yellow card) 47' Alberto; (yellow card) 55' Raúl Cámara; 89' (o.g.) Lolo Reyes	Stadium: Juegos Mediterráneos; Attendance: 7,639; Referee: Saúl Ais

11 October 2015 8	Girona	1 – 1	Almería	Girona
19:15	Richy (yellow card) 2'; Aday 9' (yellow card) 38'; Granell (yellow card) 25'; Lejeune (yellow card) 57'	Report	3' (pen.) Quique; (yellow card) 65' Morcillo; (yellow card) 72' Montoro; (yellow card) 78' José Ángel; (yellow card) 89' Dubarbier; (yellow card) 90+3' Chuli	Stadium: Montilivi; Attendance: 4,290; Referee: Óliver de la Fuente

18 October 2015 9	Almería	2 – 3	Elche	Almería
12:00	Lolo Reyes (yellow card) 28'; Quique 39'; Michel (yellow card) 44'; Fran Vélez (yellow card) 59'; Eldin 88'	Report	(yellow card) 19' (goal) 76' Armando; 44' (yellow card) 90+1' Álvaro Giménez; (yellow card) 56' (goal) 71' Sergio León	Stadium: Juegos Mediterráneos; Attendance: 8,736; Referee: José Piñeiro

25 October 2015 10	Mallorca	1 – 0	Almería	Palma
12:00	Yuste (yellow card) 7'; Arana (yellow card) 77'; Brandon 82'; Aveldaño (yellow card) 90+1'	Report	(yellow card) 20' José Ángel; (yellow card) 23' Michel; (yellow card) 57' Dubarbier; (yellow card) 66' Lolo Reyes; (yellow card) 90+2' Chuli	Stadium: Iberostar; Attendance: 7,351; Referee: David Pérez

1 November 2015 11	Almería	1 – 1	Valladolid	Almería
19:15	Fatau (yellow card) 25'; Quique 55'; Antonio Marín (yellow card) 72'; Chuli (penalty missed) 76' (yellow card) 81'; Montoro (yellow card) 82'; Soriano (yellow card) 90+2'	Report	(yellow card) 15' Mario Hermoso; 63' (penalty missed) 90+3' Mojica; (yellow card) 74' Pedro Tiba; (yellow card) 82' Llorca	Stadium: Juegos Mediterráneos; Attendance: 6,628; Referee: Francisco Arias

8 November 2015 12	Alcorcón	0 – 0	Almería	Alcorcón
19:15	Bellvís (yellow card) 44'; Djené (yellow card) 90+2'		(yellow card) 25' Morcillo; (yellow card) 77' Soriano; (yellow card) 85' José Ángel	Stadium: Santo Domingo; Referee: Daniel Trujillo

15 November 2015 13	Almería	1 – 1	Ponferradina	Almería
11:00	Lolo Reyes 2' (yellow card) 45+1'; José Ángel (yellow card) 39'; Cuéllar (yellow card) 41'; Morcillo (yellow card) 85'; Fatau (yellow card) 86'	Report	(yellow card) 13' Melero; (yellow card) 19' Acorán; 42' (pen.) Yuri; (yellow card) 47' Miquel; (yellow card) 62' Jonathan Ruiz; (yellow card) 79' Baró; (yellow card) 90' Berrocal	Stadium: Juegos Mediterráneos; Attendance: 7,744; Referee: Guillermo Cuadra Fernández

21 November 2015 14	Bilbao Athletic	0 – 0	Almería	Bilbao
10:00			(yellow card) 50' Casto; (yellow card) 75' Míchel Zabaco	Stadium: San Mamés; Attendance: 4,638; Referee: Javier Alberola

28 November 2015 15	Almería	1 – 1	Numancia	Almería
12:00	Óscar Díaz 5' (o.g.); Montoro (yellow card) 20'; Soriano (yellow card) 79'; Iago Díaz (yellow card) 80'; Morcillo (yellow card) 90+4'	Report	(yellow card) 33' Juanma; (yellow card) 90' Orfila; (yellow card) 90+2' Aquino; 90+5' Concha	Stadium: Juegos Mediterráneos; Attendance: 6,529; Referee: Rubén Ruipérez

5 December 2015 16	Gimnàstic	2 – 2	Almería	Tarragona
19:00	Morcillo 2' (o.g.); Álex López 26'; Manolo Reina (yellow card) 56'; Tejera (yellow card) 69'; Bouzón (yellow card) 76'; Emaná (yellow card) 86'; Xisco Muñoz (yellow card) 90+3'		16' (yellow card) 41' Lolo Reyes; (yellow card) 25' Morcillo; (yellow card) 58' Montoro; (yellow card) 61' Iago Díaz; 87' (o.g.) Álex López	Stadium: Nou Estadi; Attendance: 5,897; Referee: Gorka Sagues

13 December 2015 17	Almería	1 – 2	Huesca	Almería
17:00	Montoro (yellow card) 66'; Dubarbier (yellow card) 73'; Chuli 84' (yellow card) 90+1'; Fran Vélez (yellow card) 90+1'	Report	24' Luis Fernández; 40' Machís; (yellow card) 87' Morillas; (yellow card) 88' Whalley; (yellow card) 90' Íñigo López	Stadium: Juegos Mediterráneos; Attendance: 6,897; Referee: Daniel Trujillo

20 December 2015 18	Oviedo	1 – 0	Almería	Oviedo
20:00	Toché 11'; Peña (yellow card) 66'; Erice (yellow card) 78'; Diegui (yellow card) 85'		(yellow card) 16' Montoro; (yellow card) 90' Lolo Reyes; (yellow card) 90+3' Morcillo	Stadium: Carlos Tartiere; Attendance: 14,682; Referee: Saúl Ais Reig

13 December 2015 19	Almería	2 – 1	Llagostera	Almería
17:00	Quique 47'; Fatau 52' (yellow card) 71'; Ximo Navarro (yellow card) 62'; Lolo Reyes (yellow card) 72'	Report	(yellow card) 37' Pitu; (yellow card) 42' Samu; 54' (yellow card) 57' Querol; (yellow card) 75' Masó	Stadium: Juegos Mediterráneos; Attendance: 6,947; Referee: Daniel Ocón Arráiz

9 January 2016 20	Mirandés	1 – 1	Almería	Miranda de Ebro
18:00	Kijera 46' (yellow card) 77'; Carlos Moreno (yellow card) 85'; Sangalli (yellow card) 88'		(yellow card) 44' Dubarbier; 53' Morcillo	Stadium: Anduva; Attendance: 3,113; Referee: Rubén Eiriz Mata

17 January 2016 21	Almería	0 – 1	Córdoba	Almería
12:15	Fatau (yellow card) 25'; Ximo Navarro (yellow card) 53'		(yellow card) 2' Rodas; (yellow card) 40' Deivid; (yellow card) 47' (red card) 55' Stankevičius; 52' Andone; (yellow card) 53' Marković	Stadium: Juegos Mediterráneos; Attendance: 8,634; Referee: Pablo González

23 January 2016 22	Leganés	2 – 1	Almería	Madrid
20:00	Alexander 5'; Víctor Díaz (yellow card) 32'; Mantovani 41'; Sastre (yellow card) 76'; Gabriel (yellow card) 78'		(yellow card) 10' Morcillo; (yellow card) 24' Fatau; (yellow card) 34' Iago Díaz; 46' Quique; (yellow card) 53' Dubarbier	Stadium: Butarque; Attendance: 4,362; Referee: Piñeiro Crespo

31 January 2016 23	Almería	2 – 1	Zaragoza	Almería
12:00	Dubarbier (yellow card) 46'; Chuli 54' 60' (yellow card) 90'; Lolo Reyes (yellow card) 72'		(yellow card) 44' Manu Herrera; (yellow card) 55' Dorca; (yellow card) 66' Tarsi; 84' Ángel; (yellow card) 90' Campins	Stadium: Juegos Mediterráneos; Attendance: 7,794; Referee: Sagués Oscoz

7 February 2016 24	Osasuna	0 – 0	Almería	Pamplona
17:00	Vera (yellow card) 50'; Oier (yellow card) 55'; Tano (yellow card) 57'; Kodro (yellow card) 76'; Maikel (yellow card) 84'	Report	(yellow card) 17' José Ángel; (yellow card) 23' Morcillo	Stadium: El Sadar; Attendance: 13,239; Referee: Daniel Ocón Arráiz

13 February 2016 25	Almería	0 – 2	Lugo	Almería
18:00	Michel (yellow card) 89'	Report	53' Iriome; (yellow card) 63' Seoane; (yellow card) 69' De Coz; 90+3' Caballero	Stadium: Juegos Mediterráneos; Attendance: 6,485; Referee: Javier Alberola Rojas

21 February 2016 26	Alavés	1 – 1	Almería	Vitoria
12:00	Laguardia (yellow card) 26'; Pelegrín (yellow card) 36'; Raúl García 89'	Report	1' (yellow card) 62' Saveljich; (yellow card) 24' (red card) 85' Quique; (yellow card) 41' Fatau; (yellow card) 64' Dubarbier; (yellow card) 67' Chuli; (yellow card) 72' Iago Díaz; (yellow card) 78' Casto	Stadium: Mendizorroza; Attendance: 10,292; Referee: Rubén Ruipérez

28 February 2016 27	Almería	1 – 0	Albacete	Almería
12:00	Cuéllar (yellow card) 17'; Saveljich (yellow card) 73'; Soriano (red card) 74'; Pozo 90+3'	Report	(yellow card) 29' Paredes; (yellow card) 31' Gonzalo; (yellow card) 46' Córcoles; (yellow card) 69' Pulido; (yellow card) 84' Benito; (yellow card) 86' Núñez	Stadium: Juegos Mediterráneos; Attendance: 6,581; Referee: Valentín Pizarro

6 March 2016 28	Tenerife	0 – 0	Almería	Tenerife
18:00	Cámara (yellow card) 14' (red card) 57'; Lozano (yellow card) 39'; Sanz (yellow card) 55'; Carlos Ruiz (yellow card) 68'; Saúl (yellow card) 72'; Vitolo (yellow card) 90+1'		(yellow card) 36' Quique; (yellow card) 45+1' Chuli; (yellow card) 61' Lolo Reyes; (yellow card) 62' Saveljich	Stadium: Heliodoro Rodríguez López; Attendance: 9,398; Referee: Guillermo Cuadra Fernández

12 March 2016 29	Almería	1 – 0	Girona	Almería
18:00	Quique 16'; Ximo Navarro (yellow card) 55'		(yellow card) 27' Aday; (yellow card) 43' Alcalá; (yellow card) 86' Alcaraz; (yellow card) 91+1' Mata	Stadium: Juegos Mediterráneos; Referee: De la Fuente Ramos

19 March 2016 30	Elche	0 – 0	Almería	Elche
18:00	Caro (yellow card) 38'		(yellow card) 22' Ximo Navarro; (yellow card) 34' Morcillo; (red card) 82' Saveljich	Stadium: Martínez Valero; Referee: Valdés Aller

27 March 2016 31	Almería	1 – 1	Mallorca	Almería
17:00	José Ángel 84'; Morcillo (yellow card) 90+1'		(yellow card) 26' (goal) 71' Yuste; (yellow card) 31' Sissoko; (yellow card) 81' Campabadal	Stadium: Juegos Mediterráneos; Referee: David Pérez Pallas

3 April 2016 32	Valladolid	1 – 1	Almería	Valladolid
17:00	Chica (yellow card) 53'; Borja (yellow card) 72'; Villar 90+3'	Report	(yellow card) 28' Morcillo; (yellow card) 45+1' Dubarbier; 51' Quique; (yellow card) 69' Saveljich; (yellow card) 77' Lolo Reyes; (yellow card) 90+3' Chuli	Stadium: Nuevo José Zorrilla; Attendance: 7,756; Referee: Víctor Areces Franco

9 April 2016 33	Almería	1 – 1	Alcorcón	Almería
18:00	Cuéllar (yellow card) 14'; Pozo 41'; Fran Vélez (yellow card) 52'; José Ángel (yellow card) 72'		(yellow card) 4' Fede Vega; 34' (yellow card) 57' Chema	Stadium: Juegos Mediterráneos; Attendance: 7,248; Referee: Daniel Ocón Arráiz

17 April 2016 34	Ponferradina	1 – 3	Almería	Ponferrada
17:00	Jebor (yellow card) 41'; Caiado 82'; Infante 89'	Report	3' Ramírez; 33' 59' Quique; (yellow card) 39' José Ángel	Stadium: El Toralín; Attendance: 6,033; Referee: Francisco Arias López

24 April 2016 35	Almería	3 – 2	Bilbao Athletic	Almería
17:00	Pozo 34'; Morcillo (yellow card) 40'; Quique 50'; Lolo Reyes (yellow card) 88'; Uche 90+1'	Report	(yellow card) 32' (goal) 42' Guarrotxena; 56' Iriondo; (yellow card) 80' Etxeberria; (yellow card) 88' Jon Iru	Stadium: Juegos Mediterráneos; Attendance: 9,302; Referee: Javier Alberola Rojas

30 April 2016 36	Numancia	2 – 0	Almería	Soria
18:00	Medina 21'; Antonio Martínez (yellow card) 26'; Álex Alegría 49'	Report	(yellow card) 9' José Ángel; (yellow card) 18' Michel; (yellow card) 32' Morcillo; (yellow card) 45' Dubarbier	Stadium: Los Pajaritos; Attendance: 2,694; Referee: Arcediano Monescillo

7 May 2016 37	Almería	1 – 2	Gimnàstic	Almería
18:00	Fran Vélez (yellow card) 41' (red card) 90'; Ximo Navarro 45+2' (yellow card) 73'; Adri Castellano (yellow card) 50'; Lolo Reyes (yellow card) 90+7'	Report	(yellow card) 24' Mossa; 36' Naranjo; (yellow card) 45+1' Valentín; (yellow card) 49' Aburjania; (yellow card) 59' Giner; 85' Xavi Molina	Stadium: Juegos Mediterráneos; Attendance: 7,538; Referee: David Pérez Pallas

15 May 2016 38	Huesca	2 – 1	Almería	Huesca
21:00	Carlos David (yellow card) 45+2'; Tyronne 72'; Bambock (yellow card) 74'; González 76' (yellow card) 80'; Mérida (yellow card) 82'	Report	19' Quique; (yellow card) 32' Pozo; (yellow card) 44' Dubarbier; (yellow card) 80' Morcillo; (yellow card) 90+1' José Ángel	Stadium: El Alcoraz; Attendance: 3,197; Referee: Rubén Ruipérez

7 May 2016 39	Almería	3 – 1	Oviedo	Almería
18:00	Dubarbier (yellow card) 61'; Ramírez (yellow card) 62'; Quique 67'; Lolo Reyes (yellow card) 71'; Uche 77'; José Ángel (yellow card) 84'; Chuli 88'	Report	(yellow card) 51' Susaeta; 59' Linares; (yellow card) 72' Erice	Stadium: Juegos Mediterráneos; Attendance: 9,952; Referee: Daniel Trujillo Suárez

25 May 2016 40	Llagostera	0 – 0	Almería	Palamós
20:30	Escassi (yellow card) 63'; Herrero (yellow card) 77'	Report	(yellow card) 61' Saveljich; (yellow card) 62' Lolo Reyes; (yellow card) 82' Dubarbier; (yellow card) 90+1' Ximo Navarro	Stadium: Palamós Costa Brava; Attendance: 3,512; Referee: Saúl Ais Reig

29 May 2016 41	Almería	2 – 1	Mirandés	Almería
20:00	Uche 8'; Morcillo 77' (yellow card) 78'	Report	51' Álex García	Stadium: Juegos Mediterráneos; Attendance: 8,640; Referee: Daniel Trujillo Suárez

4 June 2016 42	Córdoba	1 – 1	Almería	Córdoba
20:30	De Tomás 67'	Report	(yellow card) 13' Saveljich; 36' Quique; (red card) 44' Lolo Reyes	Stadium: Nuevo Arcángel; Attendance: 18,508; Referee: Dámaso Arcediano Monescillo

=== Copa del Rey ===
9 September 2015 2	Almería	3 – 3 (a.e.t.) (4 – 3 p)	Elche	Almería
20:00	Soriano 24'; Cristian Herrera 69' 92'; Míchel (red card) 74'; José Ángel (yellow card) 106'; Fatau (yellow card) 106'		67' Nono; 74' Sergio León; (yellow card) 89' Álvaro Giménez; (yellow card) 104' Armando; 110' Liberto; (yellow card) 111' Isidoro	Stadium: Juegos Mediterráneos; Referee: Trujillo Suárez
	Penalties
	Iván Sánchez (penalty missed); Morcillo (penalty scored); Antonio Puertas (penalty scored); Cristian Herrera (penalty scored); José Ángel (penalty scored)		(penalty scored) Ilie; (penalty scored) Sergio León; (penalty missed) Nono; (penalty missed) Espinosa; (penalty scored) Álvaro Giménez

14 October 2015 3	Almería	2 – 1	Gimnàstic	Almería
20:30	Soriano 13'; Lolo Reyes (yellow card) 44'; Quique 74'	Report	(yellow card) 46' Emaná; (yellow card) 59' Fali; 90' Álex López	Stadium: Juegos Mediterráneos; Referee: Valdés Aller

2 December 2015 16th finals	Almería	1 – 3	Celta Vigo	Almería
15:00	Cuéllar (yellow card) 26'; Fatau (yellow card) 41'; Pozo 44'	Report	(yellow card) 6' (goal) 16' 35' Aspas; 74' Guidetti	Stadium: Juegos Mediterráneos; Referee: Jesús Gil Manzano

17 December 2015 16th finals	Celta Vigo	1 – 0	Almería	Vigo
22:00	Wass 40'		(yellow card) 39' Fran Vélez; (yellow card) 44' Fatau; (yellow card) 53' Míchel	Stadium: Balaídos; Referee: Jaime Latre
