= Antonio Marín (footballer, born 1996) =

Spanish footballer

Personal information
- Full name: Antonio Marín Molina
- Date of birth: 17 June 1996 (age 30)
- Place of birth: Benalúa, Spain
- Height: 1.78 m (5 ft 10 in)
- Position: Right back

Team information
- Current team: Estepona
- Number: 5

Youth career
- Granada
- Villarreal
- 2009–2010: La Cañada
- 2010–2014: Almería

Senior career*
Years	Team	Apps	(Gls)
2013–2016	Almería B	77	(0)
2014–2017	Almería	7	(0)
2016–2017	→ Granada B (loan)	21	(1)
2017–2019	Granada B	49	(1)
2020	Ejea	7	(0)
2020-2022	Unionistas	46	(2)
2022-2023	San Fernando	12	(0)
2023–2024	Linares	23	(2)
2024–	Estepona	6	(1)

International career
2012	Spain U16	5	(0)
2012–2013	Spain U17	9	(0)
2014	Spain U18	2	(0)
2013–2015	Spain U19	18	(0)
- * Club domestic league appearances and goals as of 13 October 2024

Antonio Marín Molina (born 17 June 1996) is a Spanish footballer who plays for Estepona. Mainly a right back, he can also play as a central defender.

== Club career ==
Marín was born in Benalúa, Province of Granada, Andalusia. He joined UD Almería's youth setup in 2010 at the age of 14, after stints with UCD La Cañada Atlético, Villarreal CF and Granada CF. He made his senior debut with the B-team in the 2013–14 season in Segunda División B, while still a junior.

On 8 January 2014, Marín made his first-team debut, starting in a 1–1 away draw against Racing de Santander for the campaign's Copa del Rey. On 5 December he appeared in his second match, playing the full 90 minutes in a 4–3 win at Real Betis for the same competition.

Marín made his La Liga debut on 8 April of the following year, starting in a 0–4 away loss to FC Barcelona. On 19 June 2015 he signed a new four-year deal with the Rojiblancos, being definitely promoted to the main squad now in Segunda División.

On 21 January 2016, after being rarely used, Marín was demoted to the B-side until the end of the campaign. On 12 August, he joined fellow reserve team Granada CF B in a one-year loan deal.

Marín terminated his contract with Almería on 1 September 2017, and returned to Granada and their reserves the following day.

== International career ==
Marín was called up to the Spain under-16 side in 2012, and later appeared with the under-17s in the 2013 UEFA European Championship qualifying and elite rounds. On 28 January 2014, he was called up to the under-18 team after playing in several matches with the level above, winning the L'Alcúdia International Football Tournament in 2013.

In January 2020, Marín joined SD Ejea on a deal for the rest of the season.

== Honours ==
Spain U19

- UEFA European Under-19 Championship: 2015
- L'Alcúdia International Football Tournament: 2013
