= Míchel Zabaco =

Spanish footballer

Personal information
- Full name: Miguel Zabaco Tomé
- Date of birth: 6 February 1989 (age 37)
- Place of birth: Burgos, Spain
- Height: 1.85 m (6 ft 1 in)
- Position: Centre-back

Youth career
- –2008: Atlético Madrid

Senior career*
Years	Team	Apps	(Gls)
2008–2010	Atlético Madrid C	34	(0)
2010–2012	Atlético Madrid B	39	(2)
2012–2015	Almería B	78	(2)
2015–2016	Almería	3	(0)
2016	→ Cultural Leonesa (loan)	11	(1)
2016–2018	Cartagena	70	(3)
2018–2019	Ponferradina	31	(1)
2019–2020	Logroñés	20	(2)
2020–2023	Burgos	56	(2)
2023–2026	NorthEast United	48	(1)
- * Club domestic league appearances and goals as of 12:33, 10 April 2026 (UTC)

Miguel "Míchel" Zabaco Tomé (born 6 February 1989) is a Spanish professional footballer who plays as a centre-back.

== Club career ==
Born in Burgos, Castile and León, Míchel graduated with Atlético Madrid's youth setup, and made his debuts as a senior with the C-team in the 2008–09 campaign, in Tercera División. In the 2010 summer he was promoted to the reserves in Segunda División B.

On 31 July 2012 Míchel joined another reserve team, UD Almería B in the third division. On 8 June 2014 he renewed with the Andalusians for three years, being promoted to the main squad at the start of the 2015–16 season.

Míchel was also named captain of the B-side in the 2014 summer, after the departure of Cristóbal to Gimnàstic de Tarragona. On 9 September 2015 – already included in the first team – he made his professional debut, starting and being sent off in a 3–3 Copa del Rey home draw against Elche CF (4–3 win on penalties).

Míchel made his Segunda División debut on 1 November 2015, starting as a left back in a 1–1 home draw against Real Valladolid. On 30 January of the following year, after appearing sparingly, he was loaned to Cultural y Deportiva Leonesa in the third tier, until June.

On 12 July 2016, Míchel signed for FC Cartagena in the third division. He continued to appear in the category in the following years, representing SD Ponferradina, UD Logroñés and Burgos CF, achieving promotion to the second level with all of them.

In July 2023, Míchel signed for NorthEast United FC in the first division of Indian football, the Indian Super League. He captained the side which finished 7th in the league stage. Zabaco then signed a contract extension on 26 Feb 2024 keeping him at the club for the 2024–2025 season. He then captained the club to its first major silverware by beating Mohun Bagan SG in the 2024 Durand Cup finals.

== Honours ==
NorthEast United

- Durand Cup: 2024, 2025
