= Houssam Kounia =

Moroccan footballer (born 2007)

Personal information
- Full name: Houssam Kounia Ait Tamlihat
- Date of birth: 18 January 2007 (age 19)
- Place of birth: Santa María del Águila, Spain
- Position: Forward

Team information
- Current team: Almería B
- Number: 27

Youth career
- El Ejido
- 2021–2025: Almería

Senior career*
Years	Team	Apps	(Gls)
2025–	Almería B	37	(6)
2025–	Almería	1	(0)

International career
2023	Morocco U16	8	(3)
2024	Morocco U17	1	(0)
2024–2025	Morocco U18	6	(0)
- * Club domestic league appearances and goals as of 15 May 2026

Houssam Kounia Ait Tamlihat (Arabic: حسام كونية آيت تمليحات; born 18 January 2007), sometimes known as just Hou, is a professional footballer who plays as a forward for Spanish club UD Almería. Born in Spain, he represents Morocco at youth level.

== Club career ==
Born in Santa María del Águila, Almería, Andalusia, Kounia played for CD El Ejido before joining UD Almería's youth sides in 2021. He made his senior debut with the reserves on 9 February 2025, coming on as a second-half substitute for Yago Paredes and scoring his side's second in a 3–1 Segunda Federación home win over Recreativo Granada.

On 19 February 2025, Kounia renewed his contract with the Rojiblancos until 2028. He made his first team debut on 3 December of that year, replacing Patrick Soko in a 2–1 away loss to CD Eldense, for the season's Copa del Rey.

Kounia made his professional debut on 3 January 2026, replacing Léo Baptistão late into a 3–2 Segunda División home win over Granada CF.
