= Giovanni Narváez =

Chilean footballer (born 1983)

Personal information
- Full name: Giovanni Marcelo Narváez Narváez
- Date of birth: 1 July 1983 (age 43)
- Place of birth: Antofagasta, Chile
- Height: 1.78 m (5 ft 10 in)
- Position: Midfielder

Senior career*
Years	Team	Apps	(Gls)
2005–2007	Deportes Antofagasta	19	(1)
2008–2009	San Marcos	91	(16)
2010	Coquimbo Unido	20	(2)
2011–2012	Deportes Antofagasta	21	(1)
2012–2014	Deportes Concepción	41	(0)
2015–2015	Santiago Morning	13	(0)
2015–2016	Deportes Puerto Montt	26	(0)
2016–2017	Rangers	5	(0)
2017	→ Iberia (loan)	11	(1)
2017	Colchagua	14	(6)
2018	Deportes Vallenar	22	(0)
2019	Naval	1	(0)
Total		284	(27)
- * Club domestic league appearances and goals

Giovanni Marcelo Narváez Narváez (born 1 July 1983) is a Chilean former footballer who played as a midfielder.

== Club career ==
After starting professionally with Antofagasta in 2005 and playing for two seasons, Narváez joined San Marcos de Arica, where he had the most productive period of his career, scoring 16 goals in 91 appearances. In January 2010, he joined Coquimbo Unido and, after one season, returned to Antofagasta, where he won the first major honour of his career, the Apertura Primera B title.

In May 2012, Narváez was asked to resign from Antofagasta after making obscene gestures toward the club's supporters in a match against Rangers as an angry protest against his mid-game substitution for his former teammate, Pablo Lavandeira.

Narváez made his last appearance with Naval in the Segunda División Profesional de Chile on 25 June 2019.

== Honours ==
Deportes Antofagasta

- Primera B de Chile: 2011 Apertura
