= Lorenzo Reyes =

Chilean footballer (born 1991)

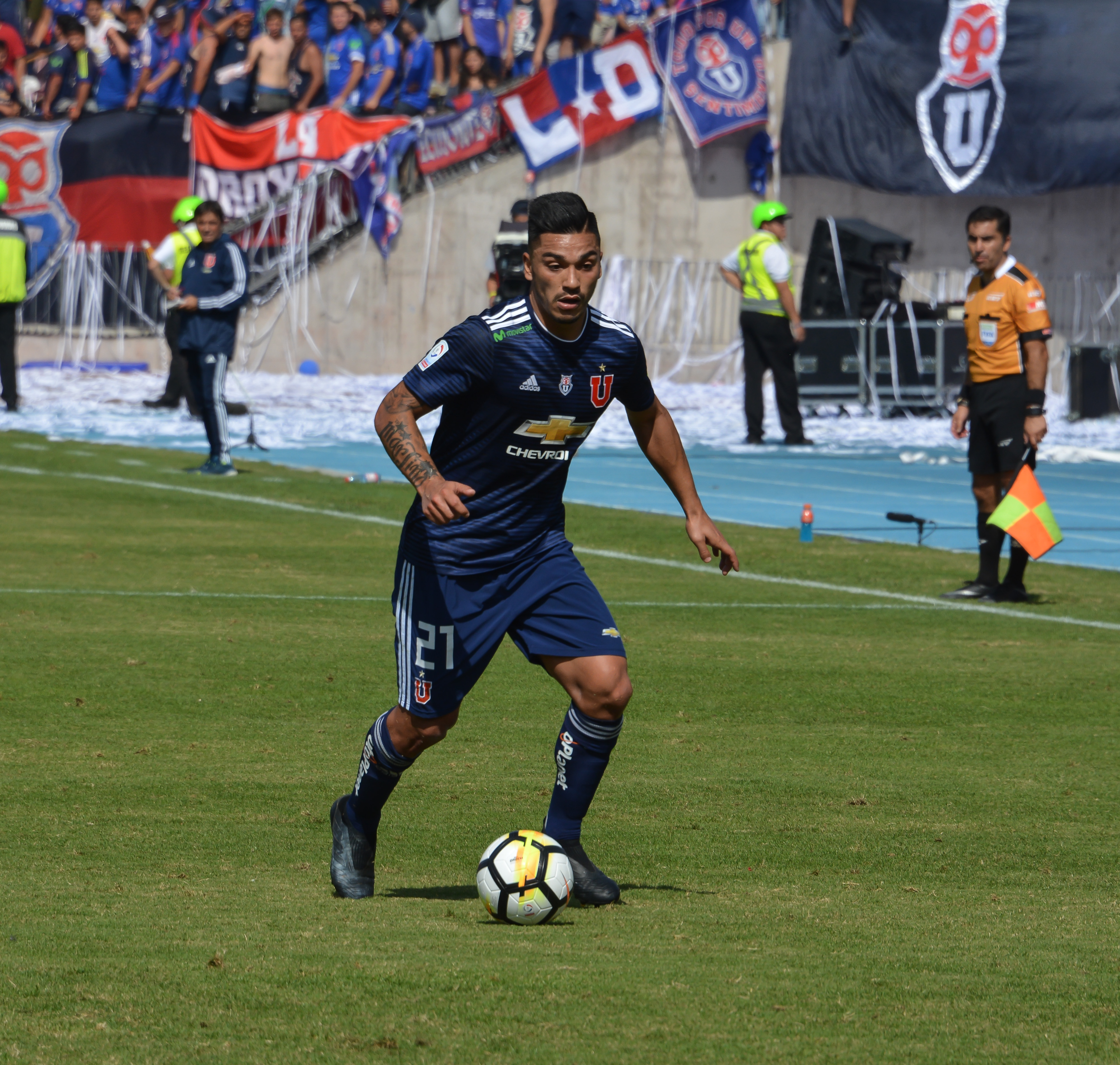
- Reyes playing for Universidad de Chile in 2018

Personal information
- Full name: Lorenzo Enrique Reyes Vicencio
- Date of birth: 13 June 1991 (age 35)
- Place of birth: Santiago, Chile
- Height: 1.70 m (5 ft 7 in)
- Position: Defensive midfielder

Team information
- Current team: Ñublense
- Number: 6

Youth career
- Atlético Valdés
- 2007-2009: Huachipato

Senior career*
Years	Team	Apps	(Gls)
2009–2013	Huachipato	122	(1)
2013–2016	Betis	58	(1)
2015–2016	→ Almería (loan)	36	(2)
2016–2018	Universidad de Chile	54	(1)
2018–2020	Atlas	60	(0)
2020–2021	Mazatlán	9	(0)
2022–	Ñublense	56	(2)

International career^{‡}
2011	Chile U20	9	(1)
2011–2022	Chile	10	(1)
- * Club domestic league appearances and goals as of 20:00, 26 April 2024 (UTC) ‡ National team caps and goals as of 16 October 2018

Lorenzo Enrique Reyes Vicencio (born 13 June 1991) is a Chilean professional footballer who plays as a defensive midfielder for Chilean Primera División club Ñublense. He's a former Chilean international.

== Club career ==
=== Huachipato ===
Born in Santiago, Reyes began his youth career at amateur side Atlético Valdés, later moving on to Huachipato's youth setup at the age of 16. He made his debut on 1 March 2009, coming on as a late substitute in a 2–0 home win over Universidad Católica. His first goal came on 17 April 2009, in a 3–1 home win over Iquique. It would be his only goal for the club.

Reyes was named captain of Huachipato in 2012, succeeding Cristián Muñoz. He retained his place at the centre of midfield for the following seasons, being named in the best XI of the Chilean league championship in 2012, after winning the first title of his career at the 2012 Clausura with Huachipato. Reyes would remain with Huachipato for the first half of the 2013 season, playing 4 matches in the 2013 Copa Libertadores, in an eventual group stage exit, and a 15th-place finish in the 2013 Apertura, playing his last match for Huachipato in a 0–2 home defeat to Palestino. Reyes would once again be selected for the league's best XI for the 2013 season, named as one of the best midfielders in the league.

=== Betis ===
On 13 June 2013, Reyes signed a four-year deal with La Liga side Real Betis. He made his debut for the Verdiblancos on 15 September, as a second-half substitute in a 3–1 home win over Valencia.

On 31 August 2015, Reyes was loaned to Almería in Segunda División, in a season-long deal. After his loan expired, he was deemed surplus to requirements by his parent club and rescinded his contract on 5 July 2016.

=== Universidad de Chile ===
Shortly after rescinding with Betis, Reyes returned to his home country and signed for Universidad de Chile. He immediately became a starter for the side, winning the 2016 Torneo Clausura with the club.

=== Atlas ===
On 23 June 2018, Reyes signed a three-year contract with Liga MX side Atlas. He was initially a first-choice, but was sidelined for six months during the 2018–19 season after suffering an Achilles tendon injury, and missed the 2019 Copa América.

=== Mazatlán ===
On 11 December 2020, Reyes moved to fellow league team Mazatlán, but left the club the following 12 August after just nine matches.

== International career ==
Reyes represented Chile at under-20 level in the 2011 South American U-20 Championship, scoring once in nine appearances as his side reached the final stages. He made his full international debut on 21 December of that year, starting in a 3–2 friendly win over Paraguay in La Serena.

After being called up sparingly by manager Jorge Sampaoli in 2012 and 2013, Reyes only appeared again for the national side on 31 May 2018, in a 2–3 loss against Romania at the Sportzentrum Graz-Weinzödl in Graz, Austria.

== Career statistics ==
=== Club ===
As of 11 September 2021

Club	Season	League			Cup		Continental		Other		Total	
Club	Season	Division	Apps	Goals	Apps	Goals	Apps	Goals	Apps	Goals	Apps	Goals
Huachipato	2009	Primera División	25	1	0	0	—		—		25	1
Huachipato	2010	Primera División	19	0	1	0	—		—		20	0
Huachipato	2011	Primera División	27	0	6	0	—		—		33	0
Huachipato	2012	Primera División	38	0	6	0	—		—		44	0
Huachipato	2013	Primera División	13	0	0	0	4 (Note: Appearance(s) in Copa Libertadores)	0	—		17	0
Huachipato	Subtotal		122	1	13	0	4	0	—		139	1
Betis	2013–14	La Liga	26	1	4	0	9 (Note: Appearance(s) in UEFA Europa League)	0	—		39	1
Betis	2014–15	Segunda División	32	0	4	0	—		—		36	0
Betis	Subtotal		58	1	8	0	9	0	—		75	1
Almería (loan)	2015–16	Segunda División	36	2	3	0	—		—		39	2
Universidad de Chile	2016–17	Primera División	28	0	3	0	—		1 (Note: Appearance(s) in Supercopa de Chile)	0	32	0
Universidad de Chile	2017	Primera División	15	0	7	0	2 (Note: Appearance(s) in Copa Sudamericana)	0	—		24	0
Universidad de Chile	2018	Primera División	11	1	0	0	4	0	—		15	1
Universidad de Chile	Subtotal		54	1	10	0	6	0	1	0	71	1
Atlas	2018–19	Liga MX	20	0	5	0	—		—		25	0
Atlas	2019–20	Liga MX	24	0	2	0	—		—		26	0
Atlas	2020–21	Liga MX	16	0	0	0	—		—		16	0
Atlas	Subtotal		60	0	7	0	—		—		67	0
Mazatlán (loan)	2020–21	Liga MX	9	0	0	0	—		—		9	0
Career total			339	5	41	0	19	0	1	0	400	5

=== International ===
As of 11 September 2021

Appearances and goals by national team and year
National team	Year	Apps	Goals
Chile	2011	1	0
Chile	2012	1	0
Chile	2013	2	0
Chile	2018	6	1
Total		10	1

=== International goals ===
Scores and results list Chile's goal tally first.

No.	Date	Venue	Opponent	Score	Result	Competition
1.	31 May 2018	Sportzentrum Graz-Weinzödl, Graz, Austria	Romania	2–1	2–3	Friendly

== Honours ==
=== Player ===
Huachipato

- Primera División de Chile: 2012 Clausura

Universidad de Chile

- Primera División de Chile: 2017 Clausura
