= Oswaldo Palencia =

Venezuelan footballer (born 1970)

Personal information
- Full name: Osvaldo Enrique Palencia
- Date of birth: 1 February 1970 (age 56)
- Position: Forward

International career
Years	Team	Apps	(Gls)
1993–1997	Venezuela	14	(3)

Oswaldo Enrique Palencia (born 1 February 1970) is a Venezuelan footballer. He played in 14 matches for the Venezuela national football team from 1993 to 1997. He was also part of Venezuela's squad for the 1993 Copa América tournament.
