= Damien Perquis =

Footballer (born 1984)

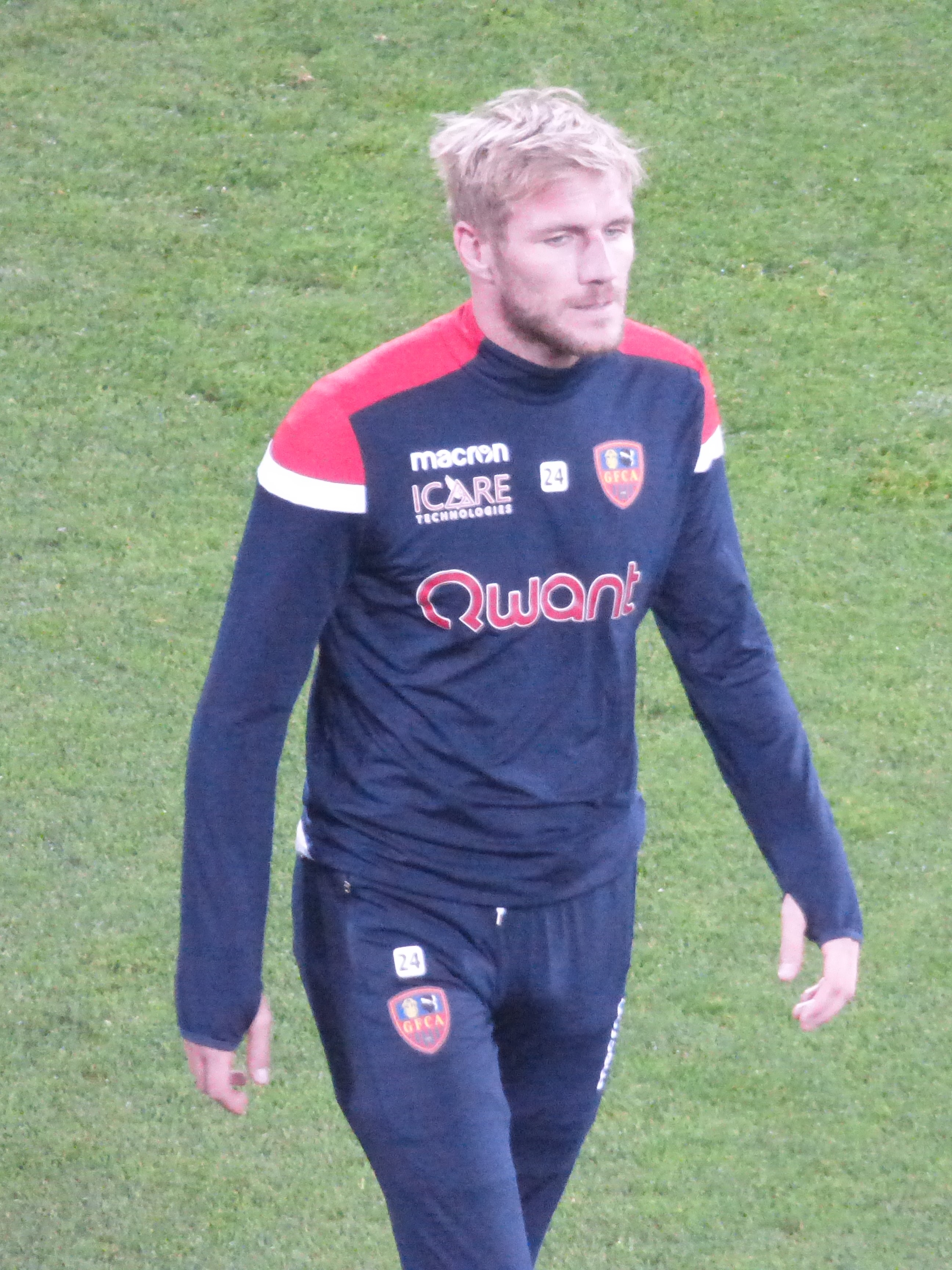
- Perquis with Gazélec Ajaccio in 2018

Personal information
- Full name: Damien Albert René Perquis
- Date of birth: 10 April 1984 (age 42)
- Place of birth: Troyes, France
- Height: 1.84 m (6 ft 0 in)
- Position: Defender

Team information
- Current team: Gazélec Ajaccio B (assistant)

Youth career
- INF Clairefontaine
- Troyes

Senior career*
Years	Team	Apps	(Gls)
2001–2003	Troyes B	18	(0)
2003–2005	Troyes	62	(3)
2005–2008	Saint-Étienne	23	(1)
2007–2008	→ Sochaux (loan)	23	(1)
2008–2012	Sochaux	123	(10)
2012–2015	Real Betis	32	(0)
2015–2016	Toronto FC	37	(2)
2016–2017	Nottingham Forest	17	(2)
2017–2019	Gazélec Ajaccio	42	(0)
Total		388	(19)

International career
2005	France U21	3	(0)
2011–2013	Poland	14	(1)

Managerial career
- 2020–: Gazélec Ajaccio B (assistant)
- * Club domestic league appearances and goals

Damien Albert René Perquis (born 10 April 1984) is a former professional footballer and current assistant coach of Gazélec Ajaccio's B-team.

A defender, he represented France at youth level, before acquiring Polish citizenship and playing for Poland at senior level. He retired in June 2020, after an 18-year professional career.

== Personal life ==
Perquis was born in Troyes, France. He is of Polish descent by way of his grandmother, Józefa Bierła. His Polish ancestors were from Strzyżewko, in central Poland. He is married, and has two children.

== Club career ==
=== Troyes ===
Perquis came up through the Troyes AC youth system. He played in Ligue 2 with Troyes AC for 2 years, where he was rated as one of the best defenders of the league.

=== Saint-Étienne ===
In 2005, he signed for Ligue 1 club AS Saint-Étienne as a free agent. In two seasons, he failed to impress with the club and was loaned to Sochaux. After some initial troubles, he finally found his form and became a regular in the starting line-up.

=== Sochaux ===
In 2008, Sochaux bought the player outright. He made a total of 146 appearances for the club, scoring eleven goals, before leaving the club in the summer of 2012.

=== Real Betis ===
In the summer of 2012, Perquis joined Real Betis in Spain. He suffered through various injury problems while in Spain, and was limited to 32 league matches in his three years with Betis.

=== Toronto FC ===
Perquis was released by Betis and signed with Toronto FC of Major League Soccer on 26 January 2015. He mutually agreed to part ways with the club on 12 July 2016.

=== Nottingham Forest ===
On 22 July 2016, Perquis signed a two-year deal with Nottingham Forest. On 27 August 2016, he scored his first goal for the club in a 3–1 home win against Leeds United. On 24 July 2017, Perquis and Nottingham Forest agreed to mutually terminate his contract at the club.

=== Gazélec Ajaccio ===
In 2017, Perquis moved to Gazélec Ajaccio in the Ligue 2, where he played for two years.

== International career ==
In December 2008, he declared his interest in playing for the Poland national team. Franciszek Smuda, manager of Poland, confirmed that information in July 2010. In January 2011, it was reported that Perquis had filed his application for confirmation of citizenship. However, his family had lost some required documents, and Perquis resigned for applying for confirmation of citizenship. Smuda had to request that the Polish president Bronislaw Komorowski approve his application for citizenship. Perquis received Polish citizenship on 1 September 2011.

On 6 September 2011, Perquis made his international debut during a 2–2 friendly draw against Germany in Gdańsk. He scored his first goal on 26 May 2012, in a 1–0 friendly win against Slovakia. He was selected to the final squad for the UEFA Euro 2012.

== Coaching career ==
After announcing his retirement from football on social medias on 15 June 2020, Perquis was appointed assistant coach of Gazélec Ajaccio's reserve team.

== Career statistics ==
=== Club ===
Appearances and goals by club, season and competition
Club	Season	League			National cup (Note: Includes Coupe de France, Copa del Rey, Canadian Championship)		League cup (Note: Includes Coupe de la Ligue, EFL Cup)		Europe		Other		Total	
Club	Season	Division	Apps	Goals	Apps	Goals	Apps	Goals	Apps	Goals	Apps	Goals	Apps	Goals
Troyes B	2001–02	Championnat National 2	3	0	—		—		—		0	0	3	0
Troyes B	2002–03	Championnat National 2	15	0	—		—		—		0	0	15	0
Troyes	2002–03	Ligue 1	0	0	0	0	0	0	—		—		0	0
Troyes	2003–04	Ligue 2	27	1	0	0	2	0	—		—		29	1
Troyes	2004–05	Ligue 2	35	2	2	0	2	0	—		—		39	2
Troyes	Total		80	3	2	0	4	0	—		0	0	86	3
Saint-Étienne	2005–06	Ligue 1	15	0	0	0	0	0	—		—		15	0
Saint-Étienne	2006–07	Ligue 1	8	1	0	0	0	0	—		—		8	1
Saint-Étienne	2007–08	Ligue 1	0	0	0	0	0	0	—		—		0	0
Saint-Étienne	Total		23	1	0	0	0	0	—				23	1
Sochaux (loan)	2007–08	Ligue 1	23	1	0	0	0	0	—		—		23	1
Sochaux	2008–09	Ligue 1	36	2	0	0	0	0	—		—		36	2
Sochaux	2009–10	Ligue 1	34	3	3	0	0	0	—		—		37	3
Sochaux	2010–11	Ligue 1	35	5	3	0	0	0	—		—		38	3
Sochaux	2011–12	Ligue 1	18	0	1	0	1	0	2 (Note: Appearances in UEFA Europa League)	0	—		22	0
Sochaux	2012–13	Ligue 1	0	0	0	0	0	0	—		—		0	0
Sochaux	Total		123	10	7	0	1	0	2	0	—		133	10
Real Betis	2012–13	Primera División	10	0	4	0	—		—		—		14	0
Real Betis	2013–14	Primera División	13	0	1	0	—		8	0	—		22	0
Real Betis	2014–15	Segunda División	9	0	3	2	—		—		—		12	2
Real Betis	Total		32	0	8	2	0	0	8	0	—		48	2
Toronto	2015	MLS	25	1	1	0	0	0	0	0	0	0	26	1
Toronto	2016	MLS	12	1	0	0	0	0	0	0	0	0	12	1
Toronto	Total		37	2	1	0	0	0	0	0	0	0	38	2
Nottingham Forest	2016–17	Championship	17	2	0	0	2	0	—		0	0	19	2
Gazélec Ajaccio	2017–18	Ligue 2	22	0	1	0	1	0	0	0	0	0	24	0
Gazélec Ajaccio	2018–19	Ligue 2	20	0	3	1	0	0	0	0	1 (Note: Appearance in relegation play-offs)	0	24	1
Gazélec Ajaccio	Total		42	0	4	1	1	0	0	0	1	0	48	1
Career total			377	19	20	3	4	0	10	0	1	0	418	21

=== International ===
Appearances and goals by national team and year
National team	Year	Apps	Goals
Poland	2011	6	0
Poland	2012	8	1
Poland	2013	1	0
Total		14	1

Score and result list Poland's goal tally first, score column indicates score after Perquis goal.

International goal scored by Damien Perquis
No.	Date	Venue	Opponent	Score	Result	Competition
1	26 May 2012	Hypo-Arena, Klagenfurt, Austria	Slovakia	1–0	1–0	Friendly
