= Yago Paredes =

Spanish footballer

Personal information
- Full name: Yago Paredes Rivera
- Date of birth: 1 November 2004 (age 22)
- Place of birth: Madrid, Spain
- Height: 1.87 m (6 ft 2 in)
- Position: Forward

Team information
- Current team: Almería B
- Number: 10

Youth career
- 2012–2016: Nuevo Boadilla
- 2016–2017: EFMO Boadilla
- 2017–2018: Getafe
- 2018–2019: Móstoles
- 2019–2020: Getafe
- 2020–2021: Alcorcón

Senior career*
Years	Team	Apps	(Gls)
2021–2023	Alcorcón B	60	(15)
2022–2024	Alcorcón	4	(0)
2023–2024	→ Valladolid B (loan)	32	(5)
2024–	Almería B	34	(2)
- * Club domestic league appearances and goals as of 16 May 2026

Yago Paredes Rivera (born 1 November 2004) is a Spanish footballer who plays as a forward for UD Almería B.

== Club career ==
Born in Madrid, Paredes represented CD Nuevo Boadilla, EF Madrid Oeste Boadilla, Getafe CF (two stints), CD Móstoles URJC and AD Alcorcón as a youth. After impressing with the latter's Juvenil side, he made his senior debut with the reserves on 5 September 2021, starting in a 1–1 Tercera División RFEF home draw against Getafe CF B.

Paredes scored his first senior goal on 15 September 2021, netting the equalizer for the B's in a 1–1 home draw against AD Parla. He made his first team debut the following 6 March, coming on as a late substitute for Óscar Rivas in a 0–1 away loss against CD Lugo in the Segunda División championship.

On 30 August 2023, Paredes moved to another reserve team, Real Valladolid Promesas in Segunda Federación, on a one-year loan deal. Exactly one year later, he agreed to a deal with UD Almería's B-team also in division four.
