= Charlie Took =

Cameroonian footballer

Charlie
Personal information
- Full name: Charlie Took Essome
- Date of birth: 25 May 1993 (age 33)
- Place of birth: Douala, Cameroon
- Height: 1.84 m (6 ft 0 in)
- Position: Centre back

Youth career
- Mallorca

Senior career*
Years	Team	Apps	(Gls)
2010–2014	Mallorca B	55	(0)
2012	Mallorca	1	(0)
2014–2016	Almería B	48	(0)
2016–2017	Arandina	8	(0)
2017–2018	Somozas	14	(0)
2018–2019	Villarrubia	27	(2)
2019–2021	Conquense	18	(1)
2021–2022	Sant Jordi	23	(2)
2022–2023	Conil	13	(0)
2023–2024	Bollullos	13	(0)
- * Club domestic league appearances and goals as of 12 May 2024

Charlie Took Essome (born 25 May 1993), known simply as Charlie, is a Cameroonian footballer who plays as a central defender.

== Club career ==
Born in Douala, Charlie moved to Spain in his early teens and joined RCD Mallorca's youth system. While still a junior, he began appearing in senior competitions with the B-side, but only played four games across two Segunda División B seasons.

On 25 August 2012, Charlie made his first-team – and La Liga – debut, coming on as a 77th-minute substitute for Emilio Nsue in a 1–1 draw against Málaga CF. On 25 July 2014, he signed with another reserve team, UD Almería B.

On 5 July 2016, Charlie was promoted to the Andalusians' main squad in Segunda División. However, after being deemed surplus to requirements by manager Fernando Soriano, he joined third-tier club Arandina CF on 31 August.
