= Luis Morales (footballer) =

Spanish footballer (born 2005)

Personal information
- Full name: Luis Morales Arboleda
- Date of birth: 16 February 2005 (age 21)
- Place of birth: Granada, Spain
- Position: Attacking midfielder

Team information
- Current team: Almería B

Youth career
- 2010–2014: Atlético Monachil
- 2014–2015: Monachil
- 2015–2017: Ciudad Granada
- 2017–2021: Granada
- 2021: Atlético Monachil
- 2021–2022: Betis
- 2022–2023: Calavera
- 2023: Betis

Senior career*
Years	Team	Apps	(Gls)
2024–2025	Cádiz B	44	(6)
2024–2025	Cádiz	0	(0)
2025–2026	Atlético Sanluqueño	10	(1)
2026	Melilla	10	(0)
2026–	Almería B	0	(0)
- * Club domestic league appearances and goals as of 24 May 2026

Luis Morales Arboleda (born 16 February 2005) is a Spanish footballer who plays as an attacking midfielder for UD Almería B.

== Career ==
Born in Granada, Andalusia, Morales played for CA Monachil (two stints), UD Monachil, CD Atlético Ciudad de Granada, Granada CF and Real Betis as a youth. On 5 December 2023, he signed a two-and-a-half-year deal with Cádiz CF, and was assigned to the reserves in Segunda Federación.

Morales made his senior debut on 7 January 2024, coming on as a half-time substitute in a 3–1 home win over FC La Unión Atlético. He scored his first goal on 3 March, netting the B's opener in a 3–0 home win over Racing Cartagena Mar Menor FC.

Morales made his first team debut with the Submarino Amarillo on 4 December 2024, replacing Álex Fernández in a 1–0 home loss to CD Eldense, for the season's Copa del Rey. The following 23 July, he moved to Primera Federación side Atlético Sanluqueño CF on a two-year deal.

On 20 January 2026, after being mainly a backup option, Morales moved to UD Melilla in the fourth division on a six-month contract. In July, he moved to another reserve team, UD Almería B in Tercera Federación.
