= Víctor Manguire =

Equatoguinean footballer

Michi
Personal information
- Full name: Víctor Manuel Ngabo Nsi
- Date of birth: 23 July 1989 (age 37)
- Place of birth: Bata, Equatorial Guinea
- Height: 1.82 m (6 ft 0 in)
- Position: Midfielder

Youth career
- 2006–2007: Pavía
- 2007–2008: Almería

Senior career*
Years	Team	Apps	(Gls)
2008	Almería B	1	(0)
2008–2009	Hermandad de Adra	16	(1)
2009–2014	Pavía	110	(10)

International career
2010	Equatorial Guinea	1	(0)
- * Club domestic league appearances and goals as of 1 June 2014

Víctor Manuel Ngabo Nsi (born Víctor Manuel Manguire Ntongono, 23 July 1989), commonly known as Michi, is a retired Equatoguinean footballer who played as a central or defensive midfielder.

== International career ==
In July 2010, Michi received his unique call for the Equatoguinean senior team and to play a friendly match against Morocco on 11 August 2010. Michi was substitute and replaced Kily in the 85th minute.
