= 2013–14 Real Betis season =

Real Betis
2013–14 season
- President: Miguel Guillén
- Stadium: Estadio Benito Villamarín
- La Liga: 20th (relegated)
- Copa del Rey: Round of 16
- Top goalscorer: League: Rubén Castro (10); All: Rubén Castro (13)
Home colours	Away colours	Third colours

The 2013–14 Real Betis season was the 79th season in club history.

== Competitions ==
=== La Liga ===
Pos	Team	Pld	W	D	L	GF	GA	GD	Pts	Qualification or relegation
16	Elche	38	9	13	16	30	50	−20	40 (Note: Elche finished ahead of Almería on head-to-head points: Elche 1–0 Almería, Almería 2–2 Elche.)	
17	Almería	38	11	7	20	43	71	−28	40	
18	Osasuna (R)	38	10	9	19	32	62	−30	39	Relegation to Segunda División
19	Valladolid (R)	38	7	15	16	38	60	−22	36	Relegation to Segunda División
20	Real Betis (R)	38	6	7	25	36	78	−42	25	Relegation to Segunda División

Source: La Liga, ESPN
Rules for classification: 1st points; 2nd head-to-head points;
(R) Relegated

=== Europa League ===
==== Group stage ====
Pos	Team	Pld	W	D	L	GF	GA	GD	Pts	Qualification	LYO	BET	VIT	RIJ
1	(France) Lyon	6	3	3	0	6	3	+3	12	Advance to knockout phase	—	1–0	1–1	1–0
2	(Spain) Real Betis	6	2	3	1	3	2	+1	9	Advance to knockout phase	0–0	—	1–0	0–0
3	(Portugal) Vitória de Guimarães	6	1	2	3	6	5	+1	5		1–2	0–1	—	4–0
4	(Croatia) Rijeka	6	0	4	2	2	7	−5	4		1–1	1–1	0–0	—

Source: Soccerway

Date	Team 1	Score	Team 2
19 Sep 2013	Real Betis	0–0	Lyon
3 Oct 2013	Rijeka	1–1	Real Betis
24 Oct 2013	Real Betis	1–0	Vitória de Guimarães
7 Nov 2013	Vitória de Guimarães	0–1	Real Betis
28 Nov 2013	Lyon	1–0	Real Betis
12 Dec 2013	Real Betis	0–0	Rijeka

=== Bracket ===
Round of 32
(Portugal) Porto (a)	2	3	5
(Germany) Eintracht Frankfurt	2	3	5
(England) Swansea City	0	1	1
(Italy) Napoli	0	3	3
(Slovenia) Maribor	2	1	3
(Spain) Sevilla	2	2	4
(Spain) Real Betis	1	2	3
(Russia) Rubin Kazan	1	0	1
(Israel) Maccabi Tel Aviv	0	0	0
(Switzerland) Basel	0	3	3
(Netherlands) Ajax	0	1	1
(Austria) Red Bull Salzburg	3	3	6
(Italy) Lazio	0	3	3
(Bulgaria) Ludogorets Razgrad	1	3	4
(Ukraine) Dynamo Kyiv	0	0	0
(Spain) Valencia	2	0	2
(Czech Republic) Slovan Liberec	0	1	1
(Netherlands) AZ	1	1	2
(Russia) Anzhi Makhachkala	0	2	2
(Belgium) Genk	0	0	0
(Ukraine) Dnipro Dnipropetrovsk	1	1	2
(England) Tottenham Hotspur	0	3	3
(Greece) PAOK	0	0	0
(Portugal) Benfica	1	3	4
(Ukraine) Chornomorets Odesa	0	0	0
(France) Lyon	0	1	1
(Czech Republic) Viktoria Plzeň	1	2	3
(Ukraine) Shakhtar Donetsk	1	1	2
(Italy) Juventus	2	2	4
(Turkey) Trabzonspor	0	0	0
(Denmark) Esbjerg	1	1	2
(Italy) Fiorentina	3	1	4

Round of 16
(Portugal) Porto	1	2	3
(Italy) Napoli	0	2	2
(Spain) Sevilla (p)	0	2	2 (4)
(Spain) Real Betis	2	0	2 (3)
(Switzerland) Basel	0	2	2
(Austria) Red Bull Salzburg	0	1	1
(Bulgaria) Ludogorets Razgrad	0	0	0
(Spain) Valencia	3	1	4
(Netherlands) AZ	1	0	1
(Russia) Anzhi Makhachkala	0	0	0
(England) Tottenham Hotspur	1	2	3
(Portugal) Benfica	3	2	5
(France) Lyon	4	1	5
(Czech Republic) Viktoria Plzeň	1	2	3
(Italy) Juventus	1	1	2
(Italy) Fiorentina	1	0	1

Quarter-finals
(Portugal) Porto	1	1	2
(Spain) Sevilla	0	4	4
(Switzerland) Basel	3	0	3
(Spain) Valencia (a.e.t.)	0	5	5
(Netherlands) AZ	0	0	0
(Portugal) Benfica	1	2	3
(France) Lyon	0	1	1
(Italy) Juventus	1	2	3

Semi-finals
(Spain) Sevilla (a)	2	1	3
(Spain) Valencia	0	3	3
(Portugal) Benfica	2	0	2
(Italy) Juventus	1	0	1

Final
14 May – Turin
(Spain) Sevilla (p)	0 (4)
(Portugal) Benfica	0 (2)

== Squad ==
Note: Flags indicate national team as defined under FIFA eligibility rules; some limited exceptions apply. Players may hold more than one non-FIFA nationality.

No.	Pos.	Nation	Player
1	GK	ESP	Antonio Adán
2	DF	ESP	Javier Chica
3	DF	BRA	Paulão
4	DF	ESP	Antonio Amaya
5	MF	ESP	Javier Matilla
6	FW	BRA	Léo Baptistão (on loan from Atlético Madrid)
7	MF	ESP	Álvaro Vadillo
8	MF	ESP	Nono
9	FW	ESP	Chuli
10	MF	ESP	Joan Verdú
11	MF	ESP	Juanfran
12	DF	ESP	Dídac Vilà (on loan from Milan)
13	GK	ARG	Guillermo Sara (on loan from Atlético Rafaela)

No.	Pos.	Nation	Player
14	MF	ESP	Salva Sevilla
15	DF	POL	Damien Perquis
16	FW	URU	Braian Rodríguez
17	MF	ESP	Juan Carlos (on loan from Braga)
18	MF	SEN	Alfred N'Diaye (on loan from Sunderland)
19	FW	ESP	Jorge Molina
20	MF	NGA	Nosa Igiebor
21	MF	CHI	Lorenzo Reyes
22	MF	COD	Cedrick Mabwati
23	DF	ESP	Nacho (captain)
24	FW	ESP	Rubén Castro
25	DF	ESP	Jordi
26	MF	ESP	Xavi Torres

=== Out on loan ===
Note: Flags indicate national team as defined under FIFA eligibility rules; some limited exceptions apply. Players may hold more than one non-FIFA nationality.

No.	Pos.	Nation	Player
—	GK	DEN	Stephan Andersen (on loan to Go Ahead Eagles)
—	DF	ESP	Álex Martínez (on loan to Murcia)
—	MF	ESP	Ezequiel Calvente (on loan to Recreativo)

No.	Pos.	Nation	Player
—	FW	POR	Salvador Agra (on loan to Braga)
—	FW	ITA	Vincenzo Rennella (on loan to Lugo)
