= Xavi Carmona =

Spanish footballer (born 1993)

Personal information
- Full name: Xavier Carmona Velasco
- Date of birth: 21 January 1993 (age 33)
- Place of birth: Santa Coloma, Spain
- Height: 1.82 m (5 ft 11 1/2 in)
- Position: Right back

Team information
- Current team: Ordino

Youth career
- Barcelona
- 2009–2012: Real Madrid

Senior career*
Years	Team	Apps	(Gls)
2012–2013	Real Madrid C	1	(0)
2012–2013	→ Leganés (loan)	10	(0)
2013–2015	Valladolid B	47	(3)
2014–2015	Valladolid	1	(0)
2015–2016	Almería B	14	(0)
2016	Cádiz	5	(0)
2016	→ Barakaldo (loan)	0	(0)
2017	Montañesa	2	(0)
2017–2018	Unionistas	11	(0)
2018	Los Barrios	16	(0)
2018	Gibraltar United	12	(1)
2019	Atlético Ibañés	12	(0)
2019	Moralo	11	(0)
2020	Vista Alegre	6	(1)
2020–2021	Sant Julià	18	(2)
2021–2022	Ordino	13	(0)
2022–2023	Engordany	16	(0)
2023–	Ordino	0	(0)
- * Club domestic league appearances and goals as of 7 October 2023

Xavier "Xavi" Carmona Velasco (born 21 January 1993) is a Spanish footballer who plays for Ordino as a right back.

== Football career ==
Born in Santa Coloma de Gramenet, Barcelona, Catalonia, Carmona graduated with Real Madrid's youth ranks, after a spell with fierce rivals FC Barcelona. He made his senior debuts with the C-team in the 2011–12 campaign, in Tercera División.

In August 2012 Carmona was loaned to Madrid neighbours CD Leganés, in Segunda División B. However, after appearing sparingly he joined Real Valladolid B on 15 July 2013.

Carmona played his first match as a professional on 10 September 2014, playing the full 90 minutes in a 3–1 away win over Sporting de Gijón for the season's Copa del Rey. He made his Segunda División debut on 7 June of the following year, starting in a 2–4 home loss against UE Llagostera.

On 19 June 2015 Carmona signed a one-year deal with another reserve team, UD Almería B also in the third division. On 29 January of the following year he moved to fellow league team Cádiz CF, achieving promotion to the second level at the end of the campaign.

On 3 August 2016, Carmona was loaned to Barakaldo CF in a season-long deal. In September, however, his loan was cut short, and he was subsequently released by Cádiz.

Carmona subsequently spent the following two campaigns in the lower leagues, representing CF Montañesa, Unionistas de Salamanca CF and UD Los Barrios before moving abroad and joining Gibraltar United FC in August 2018.
