= Braian Rodríguez =

Uruguayan footballer (born 1986)

Personal information
- Full name: Braian Damián Rodríguez Carballo
- Date of birth: 14 August 1986 (age 40)
- Place of birth: Salto, Uruguay
- Height: 1.93 m (6 ft 4 in)
- Position: Striker

Team information
- Current team: Juventude

Youth career
- Cerro

Senior career*
| Years | Team | Apps | (Gls) |
| 2005–2006 | Cerro | 20 | (3) |
| 2007 | Rentistas | 6 | (0) |
| 2007–2009 | Tacuarembó | 31 | (4) |
| 2009 | Peñarol | 11 | (2) |
| 2010 | Tigre | 12 | (2) |
| 2010 | Universidad San Martín | 5 | (1) |
| 2011 | Unión La Calera | 35 | (10) |
| 2012–2013 | Huachipato | 52 | (22) |
| 2013–2016 | Betis | 12 | (1) |
| 2014–2015 | → Numancia (loan) | 21 | (4) |
| 2015–2016 | → Grêmio (loan) | 14 | (1) |
| 2016–2017 | Everton | 11 | (4) |
| 2017–2018 | Pachuca | 12 | (0) |
| 2018 | → Barnechea (loan) | 12 | (6) |
| 2019– | Juventude | 0 | (0) |
- * Club domestic league appearances and goals as of 10 July 2018

Braian Damián Rodríguez Carballo (born 14 August 1986), known as Braian Rodríguez, is a Uruguayan professional footballer who plays as a striker for Brazilian club Juventude in Brazil.

== Career ==
Born in Salto, Rodríguez made his senior debuts with local Cerro in Primera División, but later moved to Rentistas. In the 2007 summer he joined neighbouring Tacuarembó, and a year later he signed with local club Peñarol.

In January 2010, Rodríguez moved abroad for the first time of his career, joining Argentine Primera División side Tigre; six months later he moved to Peru, signing with Universidad San Martín. However, after being sparingly used in the campaign, he moved teams and countries again, joining Unión La Calera.

In January 2012, Rodríguez joined Huachipato, and netted 17 goals in 37 appearances in his first season for the club, being also crowned champions of Clausura tournament.

On 25 July 2013, Rodríguez joined La Liga side Real Betis, penning a four-year deal.

On 3 March 2015, Rodríguez was loaned to Brazilian club Grêmio, signing a contract until June 2016.

== Career statistics ==
As of 7 April 2015.

| Club | Season | League | | | National Cup | | Continental | | Other | | Total | |
| Club | Season | Division | Apps | Goals | Apps | Goals | Apps | Goals | Apps | Goals | Apps | Goals |
|---|---|---|---|---|---|---|---|---|---|---|---|---|
| Peñarol | 2009–10 | Primera División | 11 | 2 | 0 | 0 | 0 | 0 | 0 | 0 | 11 | 2 |
| Peñarol | Total | | 11 | 2 | 0 | 0 | 0 | 0 | 0 | 0 | 11 | 2 |
| Tigre | 2009–10 | Primera División | 12 | 2 | 0 | 0 | 0 | 0 | 0 | 0 | 12 | 2 |
| Tigre | Total | | 12 | 2 | 0 | 0 | 0 | 0 | 0 | 0 | 12 | 2 |
| Universidad San Martín | 2010 | Primera División | 5 | 1 | 0 | 0 | 0 | 0 | 0 | 0 | 5 | 1 |
| Universidad San Martín | Total | | 5 | 1 | 0 | 0 | 0 | 0 | 0 | 0 | 5 | 1 |
| Unión La Calera | 2011 | Primera División | 35 | 10 | 2 | 1 | 0 | 0 | 0 | 0 | 37 | 11 |
| Unión La Calera | Total | | 35 | 10 | 2 | 1 | 0 | 0 | 0 | 0 | 37 | 11 |
| Huachipato | 2012 | Primera División | 37 | 17 | 5 | 5 | 0 | 0 | 0 | 0 | 42 | 22 |
| Huachipato | 2013 | Primera División | 15 | 5 | 0 | 0 | 6 | 5 | 0 | 0 | 21 | 10 |
| Huachipato | Total | | 52 | 22 | 5 | 5 | 6 | 5 | 0 | 0 | 63 | 32 |
| Real Betis | 2013–14 | La Liga | 12 | 1 | 0 | 0 | 3 | 1 | 0 | 0 | 15 | 2 |
| Real Betis | 2014–15 | Liga Adelante | 0 | 0 | 0 | 0 | 0 | 0 | 0 | 0 | 0 | 0 |
| Real Betis | Total | | 12 | 1 | 0 | 0 | 3 | 1 | 0 | 0 | 15 | 2 |
| CD Numancia (loan) | 2014–15 | Liga Adelante | 21 | 4 | 1 | 1 | 0 | 0 | 0 | 0 | 22 | 5 |
| CD Numancia (loan) | Total | | 21 | 4 | 1 | 1 | 0 | 0 | 0 | 0 | 22 | 5 |
| Grêmio (loan) | 2015 | Série A | 0 | 0 | 1 | 0 | 0 | 0 | 5 | 1 | 6 | 1 |
| Grêmio (loan) | Total | | 0 | 0 | 1 | 0 | 0 | 0 | 5 | 1 | 6 | 1 |
| Career total | | | 148 | 42 | 9 | 7 | 9 | 6 | 5 | 1 | 171 | 56 |

== Honours ==
=== Club ===
Universidad San Martín

- Peruvian Primera División: 2010

Huachipato

- Primera División de Chile (1): 2012 Clausura

Pachuca

- CONCACAF Champions League: 2016–17
