= Adri Castellano =

Spanish footballer

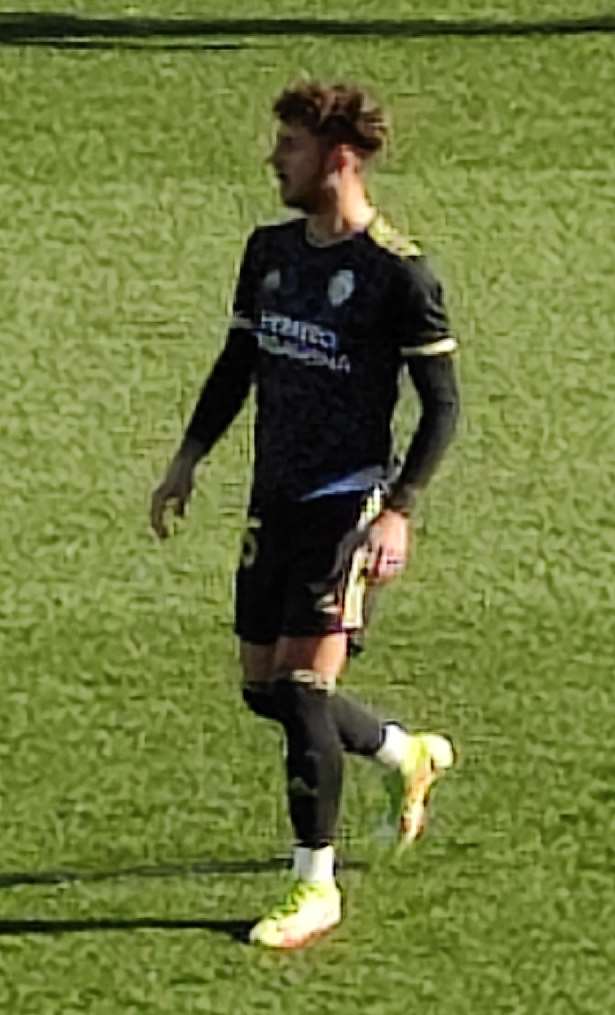
- Castellano with Ponferradina in 2021

Personal information
- Full name: Adrián Rafael Castellano Cobacho
- Date of birth: 26 June 1994 (age 32)
- Place of birth: Córdoba, Spain
- Height: 1.80 m (5 ft 11 in)
- Position: Left back

Team information
- Current team: Rajasthan United

Youth career
- Séneca
- Córdoba
- 2011–2013: Real Madrid

Senior career*
Years	Team	Apps	(Gls)
2012–2014	Real Madrid C	32	(0)
2014–2016	Almería B	50	(1)
2015–2016	Almería	3	(0)
2016–2017	Celta B	24	(0)
2017–2018	Granada B	36	(0)
2018–2019	Granada	7	(0)
2019–2020	Numancia	21	(1)
2020–2023	Ponferradina	45	(1)
2023–2024	Córdoba	1	(0)
2025–2026	Atlético Sanluqueño	17	(1)
2026	Marbella	8	(1)
2026–	Rajasthan United	0	(0)
- * Club domestic league appearances and goals as of 10 June 2026

Adrián 'Adri' Rafael Castellano Cobacho (born 26 June 1994) is a Spanish footballer who plays as a defender for Indian Football League club Rajasthan United.

== Club career ==
Born in Córdoba, Andalusia, Castellano joined Real Madrid's youth setup in 2011, after stints at Córdoba CF and Séneca CF. He made his senior debuts with the C-team in 2012, in Segunda División B.

In February 2013 Castellano was linked to Manchester City and Manchester United, but nothing came of it. On 8 July of the following year he signed for UD Almería, being assigned to the reserves also in the third level.

On 9 September 2015 Castellano made his professional debut, starting in a 3–3 Copa del Rey home draw against Elche CF (4–3 win on penalties). He made his Segunda División debut four days later, playing the full 90 minutes in a 0–1 loss at CD Lugo.

On 5 July 2016 Castellano joined another reserve team, Celta de Vigo B also in the third tier. Roughly one year later, he moved to fellow league team Granada CF B.

On 5 June 2018, Castellano signed a new two-year contract with the Andalusians, being definitely promoted to the main squad in the second division. He contributed with seven appearances during the campaign, as his side achieved promotion to La Liga.

On 5 July 2019, Castellano signed a two-year deal with CD Numancia in the second level. On 28 August of the following year, after suffering relegation, he joined fellow second division side SD Ponferradina.

On 30 June 2023, after Ponfe's relegation, Castellano agreed to a two-year contract with Primera Federación side Córdoba CF. He spent most of the 2023–24 campaign sidelined due to injuries, only featuring once as the club returned to the second division after five years.

Castellano terminated his link with the Blanquiverdes on 1 August 2024.

On 22 January 2026, Castellano signed with Marbella until the end of the 2025–26 season.
