= Chuli =

Spanish footballer (born 1991)

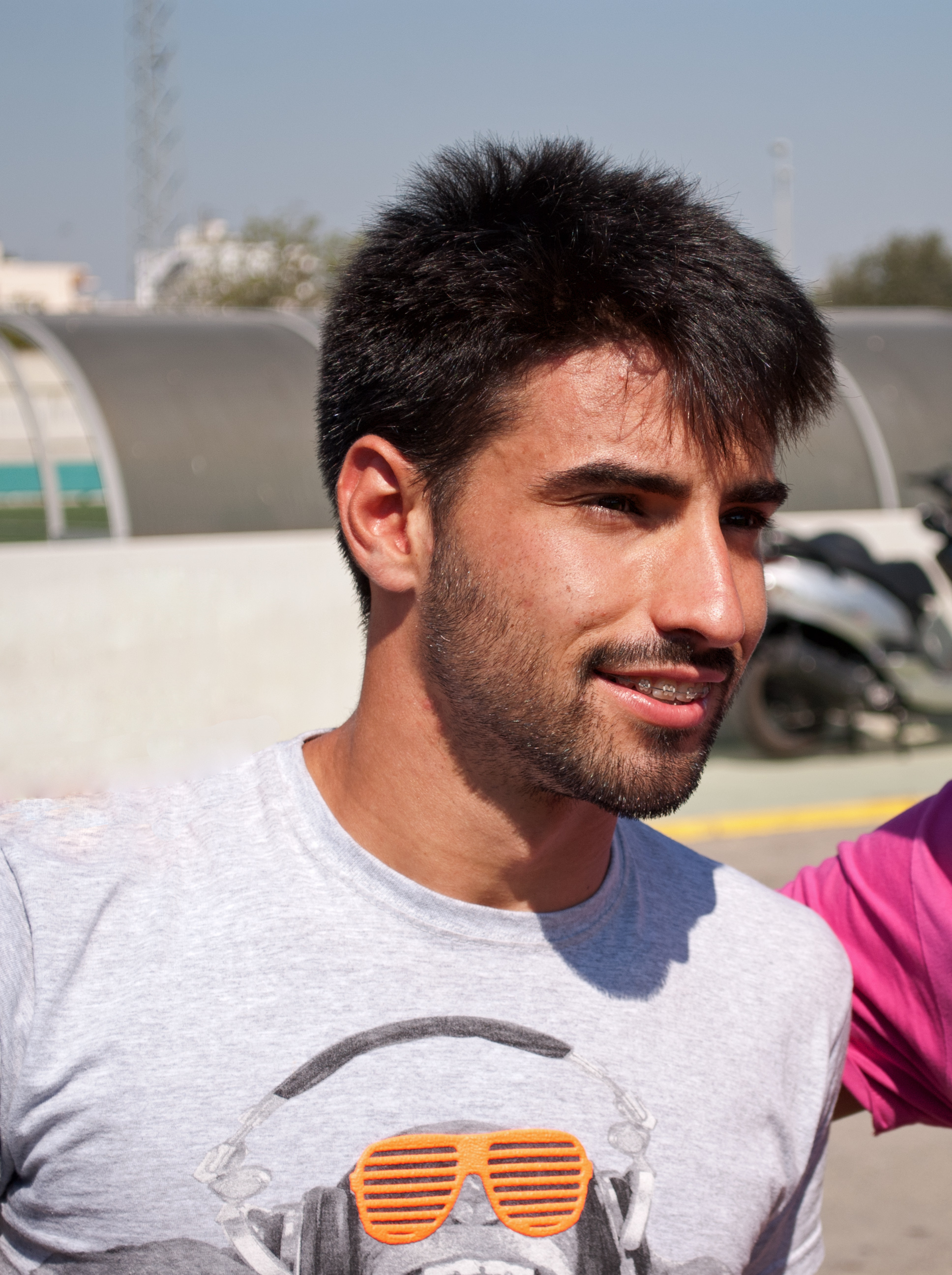
- Chuli in 2013

Personal information
- Full name: Manuel Jesús Vázquez Florido
- Date of birth: 25 January 1991 (age 35)
- Place of birth: Huelva, Spain
- Height: 1.77 m (5 ft 9 1/2 in)
- Position: Striker

Youth career
- 2004–2005: Santa Marta
- 2005–2006: Recreativo
- 2006–2010: Espanyol

Senior career*
Years	Team	Apps	(Gls)
2009–2011	Espanyol B	21	(1)
2011–2012	Recreativo B	30	(22)
2012–2013	Recreativo	40	(15)
2013–2015	Betis	14	(0)
2015	→ Leganés (loan)	21	(11)
2015–2017	Almería	47	(6)
2017	→ Getafe (loan)	18	(5)
2017–2019	Getafe	0	(0)
2018	→ Lugo (loan)	12	(1)
2018–2019	→ Extremadura (loan)	22	(1)
2019–2021	Recreativo	43	(6)
2021–2022	Hércules	25	(1)
2022–2024	Lleida Esportiu	59	(18)
2024–2025	Orihuela	29	(5)
Total		381	(92)

International career
2009	Spain U18	2	(0)
- * Club domestic league appearances and goals

Manuel Jesús Vázquez Florido (born 25 January 1991), known as Chuli, is a Spanish former professional footballer who played as a striker.

He spent most of his career in the Segunda División, totalling 163 games and 39 goals for seven clubs, mainly Recreativo and Almería. He also played 11 La Liga matches with Betis.

== Club career ==
=== Recreativo ===
Born in Huelva, Andalusia, Chuli spent his first year as a senior with RCD Espanyol's B team, appearing sparingly and suffering relegation from Segunda División B. On 22 January 2011 he scored his first goal as a senior, in a 4–0 home win over CF Amposta in the Tercera División. He signed for Recreativo de Huelva that summer, initially being assigned to the reserves also in the fourth division; he first played officially with the main squad on 16 May 2012, against Córdoba CF.

Chuli was promoted to the first team in 2012–13 after scoring 22 goals with the B's the previous season, featuring in the first game of the campaign against Xerez CD. On 8 September, he netted twice and won a penalty in the 3–2 home victory over Real Murcia CF.

Chuli continued with his form on 6 October 2012, scoring a hat-trick in a 4–2 home defeat of AD Alcorcón; one of the goals was Recreativo's 1,500th in the Segunda División. He finished the season with 15 goals (in the league and overall), helping the oldest club in Spain easily avoid relegation.

=== Betis ===
On 8 May 2013, Chuli joined neighbouring Real Betis on a four-year contract, for a fee of €600,000. He made his La Liga debut on 25 August by playing roughly 30 minutes in a 1–2 home loss against RC Celta de Vigo, and scored his first goal for his new club on 7 November, again coming as a second-half substitute in a 1–0 victory at Vitória S.C. in the group stage of the UEFA Europa League.

On 1 September 2014, Chuli was supposed to move on loan to Real Zaragoza in a season-long deal, but nothing came of it. On 7 January 2015, he was loaned to CD Leganés until June.

=== Almería ===
On 9 July 2015, Chuli signed a five-year deal with UD Almería, recently relegated from the top flight. The following 31 January, he scored a brace in a 2–1 home defeat of Zaragoza.

=== Getafe ===
Chuli joined Getafe CF on loan on 31 January 2017, with Karim Yoda moving in the opposite direction. After contributing five goals (including a brace in a 4–0 home win over his former club Almería) as his side achieved top-tier promotion, he agreed to a permanent contract.

On 12 December 2017, after making no league appearances during the campaign, Chuli was loaned to second-division CD Lugo until the following 30 June. The following 14 August, he moved to fellow league team Extremadura UD also in a temporary deal.

=== Later career ===
On 28 August 2019, Chuli returned to his hometown team of Recreativo de Huelva in the third tier. Despite arriving at a team tipped for promotion, they suffered a double relegation to the fifth division due to league restructuring in May 2021.

Chuli signed for Hércules CF of the new Segunda División RFEF in September 2021.

== Career statistics ==
As of match played 4 April 2021

Appearances and goals by club, season and competition
Club	Season	League			National Cup		Continental		Other		Total	
Club	Season	Division	Apps	Goals	Apps	Goals	Apps	Goals	Apps	Goals	Apps	Goals
Recreativo	2011–12	Segunda División	2	0	0	0	—		—		2	0
Recreativo	2012–13	Segunda División	38	15	1	0	—		—		39	15
Recreativo	Total		40	15	1	0	0	0	0	0	41	15
Betis	2013–14	La Liga	11	0	3	0	8 (Note: Appearances in UEFA Europa League)	1	—		22	1
Betis	2014–15	Segunda División	3	0	1	0	—		—		4	0
Betis	Total		14	0	4	0	8	1	0	0	26	1
Leganés (loan)	2014–15	Segunda División	21	11	0	0	—		—		21	11
Almería	2015–16	Segunda División	36	6	0	0	—		—		36	6
Almería	2016–17	Segunda División	11	0	1	0	—		—		12	0
Almería	Total		47	6	1	0	0	0	0	0	48	6
Getafe (loan)	2016–17	Segunda División	18	5	0	0	—		3 (Note: Appearances in La Liga play-offs)	0	21	5
Getafe	2017–18	La Liga	0	0	1	0	—		—		1	0
Getafe	Total		18	5	1	0	0	0	3	0	22	5
Lugo (loan)	2017–18	Segunda División	12	1	0	0	—		—		12	1
Extremadura (loan)	2018–19	Segunda División	22	1	0	0	—		—		22	1
Recreativo	2019–20	Segunda División B	22	3	2	0	—		—		24	3
Recreativo	2020–21	Segunda División B	18	3	0	0	—		—		18	3
Recreativo	Total		40	6	2	0	0	0	0	0	42	6
Career total			214	45	9	0	8	1	3	0	234	46
