= Quique González (footballer) =

Spanish footballer (born 1990)

Personal information
- Full name: Enrique González Casín
- Date of birth: 16 May 1990 (age 36)
- Place of birth: Valladolid, Spain
- Height: 1.75 m (5 ft 9 in)
- Position: Forward

Team information
- Current team: Conquense
- Number: 23

Youth career
- 2000–2009: Valladolid

Senior career*
Years	Team	Apps	(Gls)
2008–2013	Valladolid B	123	(40)
2010–2012	Valladolid	6	(0)
2011–2012	→ Logroñés (loan)	21	(0)
2013–2014	Guadalajara	38	(24)
2014–2017	Almería	81	(31)
2015	→ Racing Santander (loan)	19	(4)
2017–2018	Osasuna	42	(4)
2018–2019	Deportivo La Coruña	36	(16)
2019–2024	Eibar	101	(6)
2024–2025	Ibiza	26	(3)
2025–	Conquense	32	(7)
- * Club domestic league appearances and goals as of 7 May 2026

Enrique "Quique" González Casín (born 16 May 1990) is a Spanish professional footballer who plays as a forward for Segunda Federación club Conquense.

== Club career ==
González was born in Valladolid, Castile and León. He finished his youth career with local club Real Valladolid, and made his senior debut with the reserves in the 2007–08 season, in the Segunda División B.

On 27 August 2010, González played his first match as a professional, coming on as a late substitute in a 3–0 home win against Villarreal CF B in the Segunda División. He finished the campaign with six appearances for the main squad, totalling 145 minutes.

On 2 September 2011, González joined third division side UD Logroñés on loan. After his return, he rejected a loan to CD Guijuelo and returned to the B team in the Tercera División, scoring 19 goals during 2012–13.

After being deemed surplus to requirements by new Valladolid manager Juan Ignacio Martínez, Quique terminated his contract on 21 August 2013. He signed for CD Guadalajara on the same day.

After netting a career-best 24 goals in his only season, González joined UD Almería of La Liga on 21 May 2014. He made his debut in the competition on 12 September, replacing Wellington Silva in the 64th minute of a 1–1 home draw against Córdoba CF.

González scored his first goal for the Andalusians on 5 December 2014, the third in a 4–3 away victory over Real Betis in the round of 32 of the Copa del Rey. On 30 January 2015, he was loaned to second-tier Racing de Santander until June.

After returning from loan, González was an undisputed starter for Almería, scoring 15 goals during the season. Highlights included a brace in a 3–1 win at SD Ponferradina, on 17 April 2016.

González scored a further 16 times in the 2016–17 campaign, with braces against Levante UD (2–2 home draw), AD Alcorcón (3–1 home win) and CD Mirandés (2–0, also home) – the latter strikes also managed to help his side avoid relegation. On 14 July 2017, he signed a five-year contract with CA Osasuna of the same league for a fee of € 1.5 million.

On 20 July 2018, González joined Deportivo de La Coruña still in the second division, for a fee of €1.7 million. He was their top scorer of the season, contributing 17 goals as the side missed out on promotion in the play-offs.

González agreed to a five-year deal with SD Eibar on 14 July 2019, for an undisclosed fee reported to be in the region of €3 million. In August 2024, the 34-year-old moved to the Primera Federación with Ibiza.
