= Ángel Férez =

Spanish footballer

Personal information
- Full name: Ángel Francisco Férez Crespo
- Date of birth: 20 January 1966 (age 60)
- Place of birth: Seville, Spain
- Height: 1.76 m (5 ft 9 1/2 in)
- Position: Goalkeeper

Team information
- Current team: Almería B (goalkeeping coach)

Youth career
- Real Madrid

Senior career*
Years	Team	Apps	(Gls)
1984–1985	Real Madrid Aficionados	37	(0)
1985–1987	Castilla	10	(0)
1987–1992	Rayo Vallecano	111	(0)
1992–1994	Mérida	45	(0)
1994–1999	Cádiz	149	(0)
Total		352	(0)

Managerial career
- Cádiz B
- * Club domestic league appearances and goals

Ángel Francisco Férez Crespo (born 20 January 1966) is a Spanish retired footballer who played as a goalkeeper. He is the current goalkeeping coach of UD Almería B.

== Playing career ==
Born in Seville, Andalusia, Férez finished his formation with Real Madrid, being promoted to the reserves in the 1985 summer. He made his debut as a professional on 2 November 1986, starting in a 0–3 away loss against Recreativo de Huelva in the Segunda División.

Subsequently, Férez moved to neighbouring Rayo Vallecano, also of the second level, earning promotion in his second season but being relegated in his third. With his following club, CP Mérida, he appeared initially as a first choice but was subsequently overtook by Francisco Leal.

In the 1994 summer Férez joined Cádiz CF of the Segunda División B, retiring in 1999 at the age of 33.

== Post-playing career ==
Shortly after retiring, Férez started working as a goalkeeping coach with his last team. In 2005, he was included in Luis Aragonés' staff at the Spanish national team, and also worked with the manager during his spell at Fenerbahçe SK.

On 5 July 2009 Férez returned to his native country, joining UD Almería.
