= Jon Iru =

Spanish footballer (born 1993)

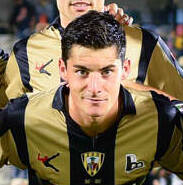

Personal information
- Full name: Jon Koldo Iruarrizaga Arteche
- Date of birth: 31 March 1993 (age 33)
- Place of birth: Bilbao, Spain
- Height: 1.79 m (5 ft 10 1/2 in)
- Position: Midfielder

Youth career
- Kelme
- 2006–2010: Elche
- 2010–2011: Athletic Bilbao

Senior career*
Years	Team	Apps	(Gls)
2011–2013	Basconia	34	(1)
2012–2013	→ Sestao (loan)	7	(0)
2013–2016	Bilbao Athletic	38	(0)
2016–2017	Murcia	9	(0)
2017–2018	Barakaldo	43	(0)
2018–2020	Leioa	37	(1)
2020–2021	Haro	24	(2)
2021–2022	Gernika	27	(2)
- * Club domestic league appearances and goals as of 11:43, 22 April 2023 (UTC)

Jon Koldo Iruarrizaga Arteche (born 31 March 1993), known as Jon Iru, is a Spanish professional footballer who plays as a central midfielder.

== Club career ==
Born in Bilbao, Biscay, Basque Country, Jon Iru spent the vast majority of his childhood living in Alicante following the transfer of his father, also a professional footballer, to Elche CF in summer 1993. After spending some years in Elche's youth setup, he joined Athletic Bilbao in 2010, aged 17, and made his debut as a senior with the farm team in the 2011–12 campaign, in Tercera División. On 31 August 2012 he was loaned to Segunda División B side Sestao River, but a metatarsus injury shortened his appearances for the club.

On 21 June 2013 Jon Iru was promoted to the reserves in Segunda División B, after his loan ended. In July of the following year he suffered a severe knee injury which sidelined him for eight months; he only contributed with 18 minutes during the whole season, as the B-side returned to Segunda División after 19 years.

Jon Iru made his professional debut on 24 August 2015, starting in a 0–1 home loss against Girona FC. He played several matches at right-back during the season due to injuries to other squad members. On 7 June 2016, after suffering relegation, he was released by the Lions and signed for Real Murcia on 18 July.

In January 2017 Jon Iru moved to Barakaldo CF. He joined another third-tier club of his home region in July 2018, SD Leioa.

== Personal life ==
Jon Iru's father and uncle, Patxi Iru and Aitor Iru, were also footballers. Both were goalkeepers, and also groomed at Athletic Bilbao. His younger cousin Ander (son of Aitor) is another goalkeeper and Athletic trainee.
