= Diego Benito =

Spanish footballer

Personal information
- Full name: Diego Benito Rey
- Date of birth: 25 August 1988 (age 38)
- Place of birth: Madrid, Spain
- Height: 1.78 m (5 ft 10 in)
- Position: Midfielder

Team information
- Current team: La Roda

Youth career
- Rayo Vallecano

Senior career*
Years	Team	Apps	(Gls)
2007–2012	Rayo B	119	(3)
2011–2012	Rayo Vallecano	6	(0)
2012–2013	Getafe B	34	(0)
2013–2016	Albacete	57	(0)
2016–2017	Murcia	31	(1)
2017–2018	Elche	10	(0)
2018	Cartagena	12	(0)
2018–2021	Hércules	72	(0)
2021–2025	Salamanca UDS	103	(14)
2025–	La Roda	0	(0)
- * Club domestic league appearances and goals as of 4 May 2025

Diego Benito Rey (born 25 August 1988) is a Spanish footballer who plays for La Roda in the sixth-tier Primera Autonómica Preferente as a midfielder.

== Football career ==
Born in Madrid, Benito began his career with local Rayo Vallecano, spending several seasons with the reserves and helping them promote to Segunda División B in 2010. He made his debut with the first team on 29 January 2011, playing six minutes in a 3–0 away win against CD Numancia and totalling two appearances during the season as the club returned to La Liga after eight years.

Benito played again almost exclusively with the B-team in the 2011–12 campaign. He appeared in his first match in the top division on 12 February 2012, coming on as a substitute for Emiliano Armenteros in the dying minutes of a 2–0 home victory over Getafe CF.

On 10 August 2012, Benito joined another reserve team, Getafe CF B also in the third level. On 20 July of the following year, he moved to fellow league side Albacete Balompié after agreeing to a two-year contract.

On 11 August 2016, after suffering relegation, Benito signed a one-year deal with Real Murcia in the third division. He continued to compete in that tier in the following years, representing Elche CF, FC Cartagena and Hércules CF.
