= Jorge Morcillo =

Spanish footballer (born 1986)

Personal information
- Full name: Jorge García Morcillo
- Date of birth: 11 March 1986 (age 40)
- Place of birth: Valencia, Spain
- Height: 1.85 m (6 ft 1 in)
- Position: Centre-back

Team information
- Current team: Mosconia

Youth career
- Valencia

Senior career*
Years	Team	Apps	(Gls)
2005–2007	Puçol	17	(1)
2007–2009	Valencia B	0	(0)
2007–2008	→ Jaén (loan)	13	(0)
2008–2009	→ Benidorm (loan)	25	(1)
2009	Córdoba	0	(0)
2009–2011	Alavés	53	(2)
2011–2012	Alcoyano	30	(1)
2012–2014	Recreativo	66	(7)
2014–2015	Rayo Vallecano	13	(1)
2015–2018	Almería	92	(7)
2018–2019	Ironi Kiryat Shmona	22	(2)
2019–2021	Recreativo	31	(1)
2021–2022	Extremadura	8	(0)
2022–2023	Avilés	43	(4)
2023–2024	Linense	27	(2)
2024–2025	Marino	26	(2)
2025–	Mosconia	24	(3)
- * Club domestic league appearances and goals as of 23:15, 8 April 2026 (UTC)

Jorge García Morcillo (born 11 March 1986) is a Spanish footballer who plays as a centre-back for Tercera Federación club Mosconia.

== Club career ==
Born in Valencia, Valencian Community, Morcillo graduated from Valencia CF's youth setup, and made his senior debut with lowly neighbours UD Puçol. He moved back to the former in the summer of 2007, being subsequently loaned to Segunda División B sides Real Jaén and Benidorm CF.

Morcillo terminated his contract with Valencia in July 2009, and joined Córdoba CF of Segunda División. He left the Andalusians on 29 December, and moved to Deportivo Alavés in the third division.

After two seasons with the Basque club, Morcillo signed for CD Alcoyano, recently promoted to division two. He played his first match as a professional on 27 August 2011, starting in a 1–1 home draw against CD Numancia, and scored his first goal roughly a month later in the 1–1 draw with Villarreal CF B also at the Estadio El Collao.

On 2 July 2012, Morcillo joined Recreativo de Huelva after agreeing to a two-year deal. He scored a career-best six goals in 35 games in his second season, helping the oldest club in Spain to the eighth position in the second tier.

On 16 June 2014, Morcillo signed a three-year contract with La Liga's Rayo Vallecano. He made his debut in the competition on 31 August, coming on as a substitute for Alberto Bueno in a 2–2 draw at Deportivo de La Coruña.

Morcillo scored his only goal in the Spanish top flight on 23 May 2015, his team's second in the 2–4 home loss against Real Sociedad. On 4 July, he severed ties with the Madrid organisation and joined second-tier UD Almería on a three-year deal.

On 19 July 2019, after one year in the Israel Premier League with Hapoel Ironi Kiryat Shmona FC, Morcillo returned to Recreativo, who now competed in the third division.

== Personal life ==
On 15 June 2018, Morcillo was arrested after being accused of match fixing. He was subsequently released, after the police declared the evidence against him to be 'inconclusive'.
