= Iago Díaz =

Spanish footballer (born 1993)

Personal information
- Full name: Iago Díaz Fernández
- Date of birth: 10 February 1993 (age 33)
- Place of birth: Barcelona, Spain
- Height: 1.82 m (5 ft 11 1/2 in)
- Position: Winger

Team information
- Current team: Sarriana
- Number: 7

Youth career
- 2000–2007: Prone Lugo
- 2007–2011: Lugo

Senior career*
Years	Team	Apps	(Gls)
2011–2015	Lugo	109	(12)
2015–2017	Almería	31	(2)
2017	→ Cultural Leonesa (loan)	18	(2)
2017–2018	Ponferradina	31	(3)
2018–2019	Recreativo	37	(2)
2019–2021	Rayo Majadahonda	32	(1)
2021–2022	Real Avilés	31	(3)
2022–2024	Recreativo	60	(3)
2024–2025	Xerez	29	(1)
2025–	Sarriana	20	(1)
- * Club domestic league appearances and goals as of 14 May 2026

Iago Díaz Fernández (born 10 February 1993) is a Spanish professional footballer who plays mainly as a left winger for Segunda Federación club Sarriana.

He totalled 123 games and 13 goals in the Segunda División over five seasons, with Lugo and Almería.

== Club career ==
Born in Barcelona, Catalonia, Díaz joined CD Lugo's youth setup in 2007, aged 14, after starting out at Prone Lugo AD. He made his debut as a senior with the former on 4 December 2011, coming on as a late substitute for Félix Quero in a 2–2 away draw against Rayo Vallecano B in the Segunda División B.

Díaz scored his first goal on 4 March 2012, his side's last in a 2–2 home draw with another reserve team, Sporting de Gijón B. He finished the season with 17 games as the Galicians promoted to Segunda División for the second time in their history, and signed a new three-year contract in the summer.

Díaz made his debut as a professional on 18 August 2012, replacing Diego Tonetto in the 1–0 home victory over Hércules CF. He scored his first goal in the second tier on 17 November, but in a 1–2 loss to Girona FC also at the Estadio Anxo Carro.

On 22 March 2014, Díaz scored the first in a 2–0 home defeat of Recreativo de Huelva, also Lugo's 100th goal in division two. On 20 December, he contributed a brace to the 6–6 draw at CD Numancia.

On 8 June 2015, Díaz signed a three-year deal with UD Almería also in the second tier. On 27 January 2017, he was loaned to Cultural y Deportiva Leonesa until the end of the third-division campaign.

Díaz cut ties with the Andalusians on 17 August 2017, and signed for SD Ponferradina later that day. He continued competing in the lower leagues the following years, with Recreativo (two spells), CF Rayo Majadahonda, Real Avilés CF and Xerez CD.

== Honours ==
Cultural Leonesa

- Segunda División B: 2016–17
