= Benalúa =

Coordinates: 37°21′N 03°10′W

- Municipality
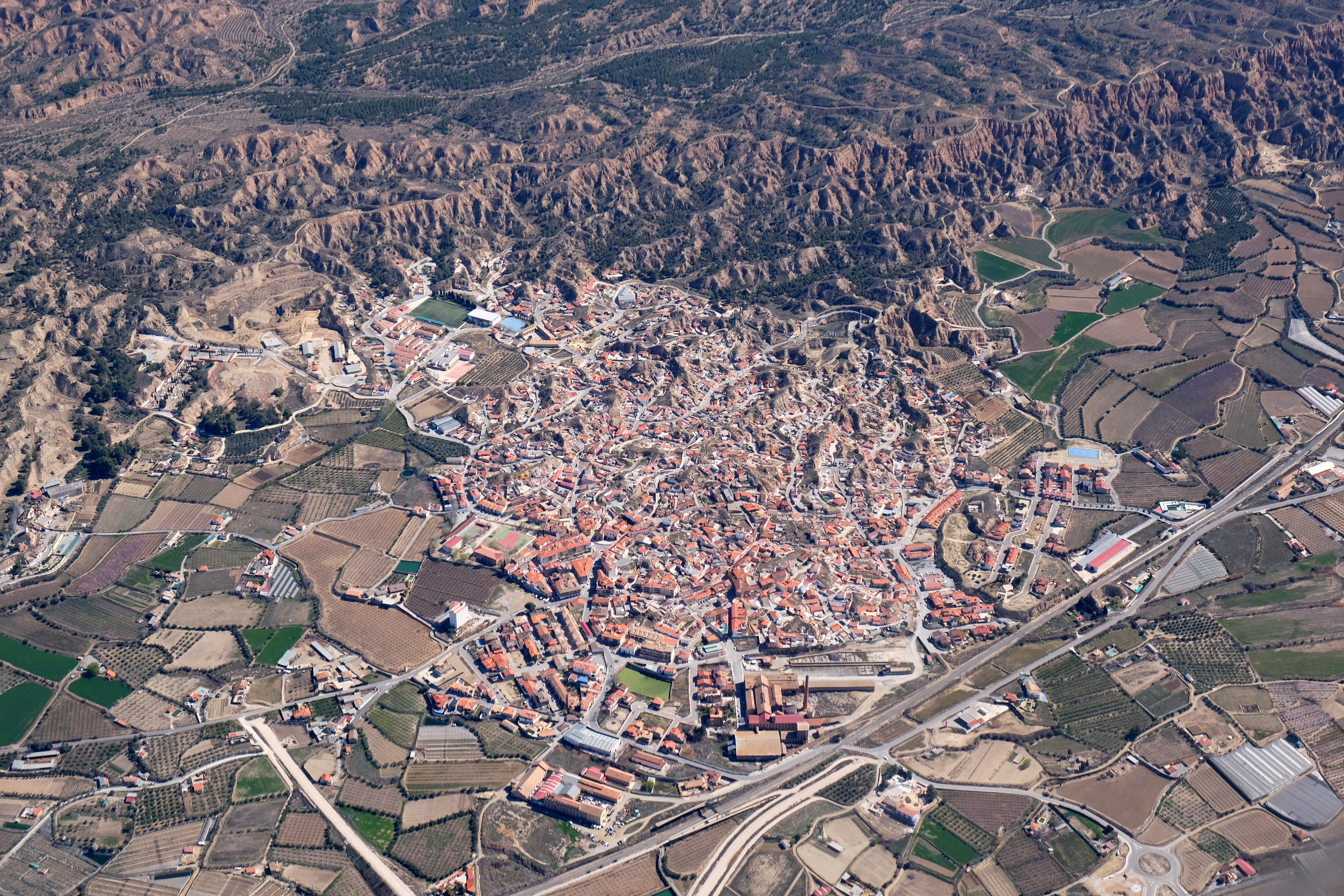

- Flag Coat of arms

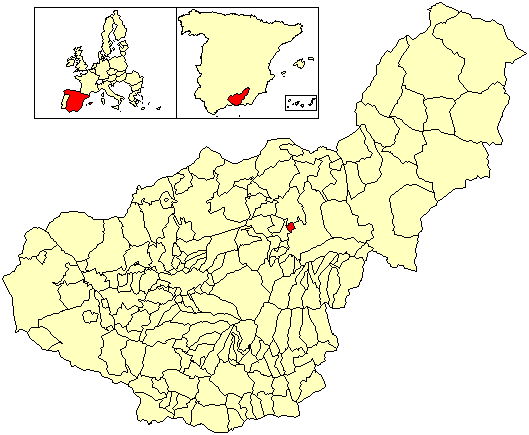
- Location of Benalúa
- Country: Spain
- Province: Granada
- Municipality: Benalúa

Area
  - Total: 8 km^{2} (3.1 sq mi)
- Elevation: 886 m (2,907 ft)

Population (2025-01-01)
  - Total: 3,381
  - Density: 420/km^{2} (1,100/sq mi)
- Time zone: UTC+1 (CET)
  - Summer (DST): UTC+2 (CEST)

Benalúa is a municipality located in the province of Granada, Spain. According to the 2006 census (INE), the city has a population of 3311 inhabitants.

== See also ==
- List of municipalities in Granada
