= Tarsicio Aguado =

Spanish footballer

Personal information
- Full name: Tarsicio Aguado Arriazu
- Date of birth: 16 October 1994 (age 32)
- Place of birth: Murchante, Spain
- Height: 1.78 m (5 ft 10 in)
- Position: Midfielder

Team information
- Current team: Alcorcón
- Number: 18

Youth career
- 1998–2004: Gramenet
- 2004–2008: Espanyol
- 2008–2011: Gramenet
- 2011–2012: Badalona
- 2012–2013: Zaragoza

Senior career*
Years	Team	Apps	(Gls)
2012–2016	Zaragoza B	107	(1)
2013–2016	Zaragoza	16	(0)
2016–2018	Bilbao Athletic	64	(1)
2018–2019	San Juan Mozarrifar	11	(0)
2019	Linense	17	(0)
2019–2020	Oviedo B	22	(1)
2020–2022	Calahorra	54	(3)
2022–2023	Cultural Leonesa	36	(1)
2023–2024	Miedź Legnica	20	(0)
2024–2025	Arenteiro	30	(0)
2025–	Alcorcón	35	(3)
- * Club domestic league appearances and goals as of 10 June 2026

Tarsicio Aguado Arriazu (born 16 October 1994), sometimes known as Tarsi, is a Spanish professional footballer who plays as a midfielder for Alcorcón.

== Club career ==
Born in Murchante, Navarre, Tarsi graduated from Real Zaragoza's youth setup, after stints with UDA Gramenet, RCD Espanyol and CF Badalona. He made his senior debuts with the former's reserves in the 2012–13 campaign, in Segunda División B.

On 20 January 2013 Tarsi played his first match as a professional, replacing injured Apoño in the 27th minute of a 0–2 La Liga loss at Real Valladolid.

On 12 July 2016, after being released by the Aragonese side, he signed a two-year deal with Athletic Bilbao. After two seasons as a regular with the reserves, he was released by Athletic Bilbao when his contract expired in July 2018.

On 31 July 2021, Tarsi joined to Primera División RFEF club Calahorra.

== Personal life ==
His father, also known as Tarsi, played as a midfielder in the 1980s and 90s, mainly for clubs in the Catalonia region.
