= Miguel Núñez (footballer) =

Spanish association football player

Personal information
- Full name: Miguel Núñez Borreguero
- Date of birth: 4 June 1987 (age 39)
- Place of birth: Siruela, Spain
- Height: 1.79 m (5 ft 10 in)
- Positions: Defender; midfielder

Team information
- Current team: Extremadura 1924
- Number: 14

Youth career
- Flecha Negra
- 2004–2007: Valencia

Senior career*
Years	Team	Apps	(Gls)
2007–2010	Albacete B	55	(5)
2007–2008	→ Villanovense (loan)	27	(1)
2010–2016	Albacete	195	(5)
2016–2017	Ponferradina	22	(0)
2017–2018	Mallorca	4	(0)
2018–2020	Ibiza	58	(3)
2020–2021	Badalona	11	(0)
2021–2022	Badajoz	41	(2)
2022–2023	Eldense	34	(0)
2023–2024	Badajoz	24	(1)
2024–	Extremadura 1924	49	(1)
- * Club domestic league appearances and goals as of 15 May 2026

Miguel Núñez Borreguero (born 4 June 1987) is a Spanish footballer who plays for Extremadura 1924. Mainly a defensive midfielder, he can also play as a central defender or a left-back.

== Club career ==
Núñez was born in Siruela, Province of Badajoz. He spent the better part of his first nine seasons as a senior with Albacete Balompié, also representing their reserves and CF Villanovense (on loan) in the Tercera División.

Núñez made his Segunda División debut with the first team on 30 January 2010, coming on as a 70th-minute substitute in a 2–2 home draw against Rayo Vallecano and scoring the game's last goal. He was relegated twice with the club from that tier, making 212 competitive appearances during his spell.

After leaving the Estadio Carlos Belmonte, Núñez continued to play in the third division, with SD Ponferradina, RCD Mallorca, UD Ibiza, CF Badalona, CD Badajoz and CD Eldense. On 24 August 2023, after helping the latter side in their second-tier promotion, the 36-year-old terminated his contract and returned to Badajoz, now in the Segunda Federación.
