= Mohammed Fatau =

Ghanaian footballer (born 1992)

Personal information
- Date of birth: 24 December 1992 (age 33)
- Place of birth: Accra, Ghana
- Height: 1.78 m (5 ft 10 in)
- Position: Defensive midfielder

Youth career
- 2009–2010: Asante Kotoko
- 2010–2011: Udinese

Senior career*
Years	Team	Apps	(Gls)
2011–2014	Granada B	15	(0)
2011–2012	→ Cádiz B (loan)	26	(1)
2012–2013	→ San Roque (loan)	33	(0)
2013–2016	Granada	9	(0)
2014–2015	→ Rayo Vallecano (loan)	10	(0)
2015–2016	→ Almería (loan)	18	(1)
2016–2017	Gaziantepspor	20	(0)
2017–2019	Al-Qadsiah	30	(0)
2018–2019	→ Al-Kuwait (loan)	8	(2)
2020–2021	Mohammedan	2	(0)
2021–2022	Zakho		
2022–2023	Spartak Varna	0	(0)
2023	Van	1	(0)
- * Club domestic league appearances and goals as of 3 August 2023

Mohammed Fatau (born 24 December 1992) is a Ghanaian professional footballer who plays as a defensive midfielder.

Born in Accra and starting his youth career with Ghanaian club Asante Kotoko, Fatau joined Udinese in 2010. He further went on to feature in the Spain for Granada CF, Cádiz CF, San Roque, Rayo Vallecano and UD Almería.

== Career ==
=== Early career ===
Born in Accra, Fatau joined Udinese Calcio in July 2010, after starting it out at locals Asante Kotoko SC.

=== Granada ===
He moved to Granada CF in January of the following year, being assigned to the reserves in the regional leagues. On 12 August 2011, Fatau was loaned to Cádiz CF, but managed to appear only for the B-side in Tercera División.

On 27 July of the following year he joined Segunda División B CD San Roque de Lepe also on a temporary deal, and finished the season with 33 appearances (2899 minutes of action).

On 18 August 2013, Fatau made his debut with the Andalusians' first team, played the last five minutes of a 2–1 La Liga away victory over CA Osasuna. He finished the campaign with nine appearances (495 minutes of action) as the club narrowly avoided relegation.

==== Rayo Vallecano (loan) ====
On 1 September 2014 Fatau moved to fellow league team Rayo Vallecano on loan, in a season-long deal. He made his debut on 8 November 2014, in a 5–1 loss to Real Madrid. He ended the season playing 10 league matches.

==== UD Almería (loan) ====
On 21 July of the following year, he moved to UD Almería, also on a one-year loan deal. The following month, he made his debut during the first match of the season, as Almeria scored Leganes 3–2 to start the season. He finished the season with 18 matches and a goal.

=== Gaziantepspor ===
On 23 August 2016, after rescinding with Granada, Fatau signed for Turkish Süper Lig club Gaziantepspor. With the hope of reviving his career and playing more games, he signed a three-year deal with the club. On 15 October 2016, he made his debut after coming on at half time to play in a goalless draw against Kasımpaşa. In his only season, the 2016–17 season, he played 20 league matches as the club could not avoid dropping to the TFF First League. He left the club at the end of the season.

=== IFK Luleå ===
On 6 March 2020, Swedish club IFK Luleå confirmed the signing of Fatau. However, he wasn't allowed to travel into the country due to the travel bans during the COVID-19 pandemic. For that reason, he never officially signed for the club.

=== Mohammedan SC ===
On 26 October 2020, Fatau joined Mohammedan Sporting club of Kolkata.

=== Zakho FC ===
On 1 September 2020, Fatau moved to Zakho FC in Iraqi Kurdistan, northern Iraq.

=== Spartak Varna ===
On 21 July 2022 Mohammed signed a contract with the Bulgarian Spartak Varna for 2 years.
