= 2011 in Chilean football =

Football in Chile
- Season: 2011

This article covers the 2011 football season in Chile.

== National tournaments ==
=== Primera División ===
- Apertura Champion: Universidad de Chile (14th title)
  - Topscorer: Matías Urbano (12 goals)
- Clausura Champion: Universidad de Chile (15th title)
  - Topscorer: Esteban Paredes (14 goals)
- Relegated: Santiago Morning and Ñublense

=== Copa Chile ===
- Winner: Universidad Católica (5th title)

== International Tournaments ==
=== Copa Libertadores ===
- Club Deportivo Universidad Católica: Quarterfinals.
- Colo-Colo: Group Stage.
- Unión Española: Group Stage.

=== Copa Sudamericana ===
- Club Universidad de Chile: Champion (1st Title)
- Club Deportivo Universidad Católica: Round of 16.
- Deportes Iquique: Second Stage.

== National team results ==
The Chile national football team results and fixtures for 2011.

Win Draw Loss

=== 2011 Copa América ===
July 4 Group stage	Chile	2–1	Mexico	San Juan, Argentina
21:45 UTC-3	Paredes 67'; Vidal 73'	Report	Araújo 40'	Stadium: Estadio del Bicentenario; Attendance: 25,000; Referee: Juan Soto (Venezuela)

July 8 Group stage	Uruguay	1–1	Chile	Mendoza, Argentina
19:45 UTC-3	Á. Pereira 54'	Report	Sánchez 65'	Stadium: Estadio Malvinas Argentinas; Attendance: 45,000; Referee: Carlos Amarilla (Paraguay)

July 12 Group stage	Chile	1–0	Peru	Mendoza, Argentina
19:15 UTC-3	Carrillo 90+2' (o.g.)	Report		Stadium: Estadio Malvinas Argentinas; Attendance: 45,000; Referee: Sálvio Fagundes (Brazil)

July 17 Quarterfinals	Chile	1–2	Venezuela	San Juan, Argentina
19:15 UTC-3	Suazo 69'	Report	Vizcarrondo 34'; Cichero 80'	Stadium: Estadio del Bicentenario; Attendance: 20,000; Referee: Carlos Vera (Ecuador)

=== 2014 World Cup qualifiers ===
October 7 Round 1	Argentina	4–1	Chile	Buenos Aires, Argentina
20:10 UTC-3	Higuaín 7', 51', 62'; Messi 25'	Report	M. Fernández 59'	Stadium: Estadio Monumental Antonio Vespucio Liberti; Attendance: 26,161; Referee: Wilmar Roldán (Colombia)

October 11 Round 2	Chile	4–2	Peru	Santiago, Chile
19:45 UTC-3	Ponce 2'; Vargas 18'; Medel 48'; Suazo 63' (pen.)	Report	Pizarro 49'; Farfán 60'	Stadium: Estadio Monumental; Attendance: 39,000; Referee: Raúl Orosco (Bolivia)

November 11 Round 3	Uruguay	4–0	Chile	Montevideo, Uruguay
20:00 UTC−2	Suárez 42', 45', 68', 74'	Report		Stadium: Estadio Centenario; Attendance: 40,500; Referee: Héctor Baldassi (Argentina)

November 15 Round 4	Chile	2–0	Paraguay	Santiago, Chile
20:30 UTC-3	Contreras 28'; Campos 85'	Report		Stadium: Estadio Nacional; Attendance: 44,726; Referee: Héber Lopes (Brazil)

==== Friendly matches ====
January 22	United States	1–1	Chile	Carson, United States
19:00 UTC−8	Bunbury 75' (pen.)	Report	Paredes 53'	Stadium: The Home Depot Center; Attendance: 18,580; Referee: Francisco Chacon Gutierrez (Mexico)

March 26	Portugal	1–1	Chile	Leiria, Portugal
20:45 UTC±0	Varela 16'	Report	M. Fernández 41'	Stadium: Estádio Dr. Magalhães Pessoa; Attendance: 10,694; Referee: Kevin Blom (Netherlands)

March 29	Chile	2–0	Colombia	The Hague, Netherlands
20:45 UTC+2	M. Fernández 6'; Beausejour 30'	Report		Stadium: Kyocera Stadion; Attendance: 4,000; Referee: Peter Vink (Netherlands)

June 19	Chile	4–0	Estonia	Santiago, Chile
19:00 UTC-4	M. Fernández 21'; Ponce 41'; Suazo 45'; Sánchez 50'	Report		Stadium: Estadio Monumental; Attendance: 20,000; Referee: Martín Vásquez (Argentina)

June 23	Paraguay	0–0	Chile	Asunción, Paraguay
19:00 UTC-4		Report		Stadium: Estadio Defensores del Chaco; Attendance: 12,000; Referee: Paulo César Oliveira (Brazil)

August 10	France	1–1	Chile	Montpellier, France
21:00 UTC+2	Rémy 19'	Report	Córdova 77'	Stadium: Stade de la Mosson; Attendance: 30,000; Referee: Stuart Attwell (England)

September 2	Spain	3–2	Chile	St. Gallen, Switzerland
20:45 UTC+2	Iniesta 54'; Fàbregas 70', 90'	Report	Isla 10'; Vargas 20'	Stadium: AFG Arena; Attendance: 14,605; Referee: Jerome Laperrier (Switzerland)

September 4	Mexico	1–0	Chile	Barcelona, Spain
21:00 UTC+2	Guardado 79'	Report		Stadium: Estadi Cornellà-El Prat; Attendance: 7,210; Referee: César Muñiz Fernández (Spain)

December 21	Chile	3–2	Paraguay	La Serena, Chile
22:15 UTC-3	Pinto 19', 62', 74'	Report	Benítez 52'; Dos Santos 56'	Stadium: Estadio La Portada; Attendance: 9,000; Referee: Raúl Orosco (Bolivia)

== Record ==
Competition	GP	W	D	L	GF	GA
International Friendly	9	3	4	2	14	9
2011 Copa América	4	2	1	1	5	4
2014 FIFA World Cup qualification	4	2	0	2	7	10
Total	17	7	5	5	26	23

== Goal scorers ==
Player	Goals
Matías Fernández	4
Humberto Suazo	3
Sebastián Pinto	3
Alexis Sánchez	2
Esteban Paredes	2
Eduardo Vargas	2
Waldo Ponce	2
Nicolás Córdova	1
Jean Beausejour	1
Arturo Vidal	1
Mauricio Isla	1
Gary Medel	1
Pablo Contreras	1
Matías Campos	1

As of 15 November 2011
