= Cristóbal Gil =

Spanish footballer

Cristóbal
Personal information
- Full name: Cristóbal Gil Martín
- Date of birth: 5 February 1992 (age 34)
- Place of birth: Málaga, Spain
- Height: 1.70 m (5 ft 7 in)
- Position: Attacking midfielder

Team information
- Current team: Guijuelo
- Number: 10

Youth career
- 2008–2009: Málaga
- 2009–2010: Almería

Senior career*
Years	Team	Apps	(Gls)
2010–2015	Almería B	128	(14)
2011–2015	Almería	0	(0)
2014–2015	→ Gimnàstic (loan)	33	(1)
2015–2017	Cultural Leonesa	52	(5)
2017	Extremadura	9	(0)
2017–2018	Arenas Getxo	31	(1)
2018–2019	Mar Menor	18	(3)
2019–	Guijuelo	181	(10)
- * Club domestic league appearances and goals as of 15 June 2025

Cristóbal Gil Martín (born 5 February 1992) is a Spanish footballer who plays for CD Guijuelo as an attacking midfielder.

== Club career ==
Born in Málaga, Cristóbal finished his graduation in UD Almería's youth setup, and made his senior debuts with the B-team in the 2010–11 campaign, in Segunda División B.

On 6 January 2011 Cristóbal made his debut with the Andalusians' first-team, coming on as a substitute for Pablo Piatti in the 58th minute of a 4–3 win at RCD Mallorca, for the season's Copa del Rey. He then appeared on the bench in a 1–1 home draw against UD Las Palmas on 23 October, but remained unused.

After being named captain in September 2013, Cristóbal played his second match with the main squad on 18 December of the same year, starting in a 0–0 home draw against Las Palmas, again for the national Cup. On 15 July of the following year he was loaned to Gimnàstic de Tarragona, also in the third level.

On 18 August 2015 Cristóbal rescinded his link with the Rojiblancos, and signed for Cultural y Deportiva Leonesa in the same division.
