= UD Almería B =

Association football club in Spain

Almería B
- Full name: Unión Deportiva Almería, S.A.D. "B"
- Founded: 1997; 29 years ago
- Ground: Anexo al Estadio de los Juegos Mediterráneos; Almería, Spain
- Capacity: 13,648
- President: Turki Al-Sheikh
- Head coach: Pablo Nozal
- League: Tercera Federación – Group 9
- 2025–26: Segunda Federación – Group 4, 17th of 18 (relegated)
Home colours	Away colours	Third colours

Unión Deportiva Almería "B" is a Spanish football team based in Almería, in the autonomous community of Andalusia. Founded in 2001, it is the reserve team of UD Almería and currently plays in Tercera Federación – Group 9, holding home games at Anexo al Estadio de los Juegos Mediterráneos, with a 13,648 seat capacity.

== History ==
=== Club background ===
- Almería Club de Fútbol "B" (1997–2001)
- Unión Deportiva Almería "B" (2001–present)

== Season to season ==
Season	Tier	Division	Place
1997–98	6	1ª Reg.	1st
1998–99	5	Reg. Pref.	2nd
1999–2000	5	Reg. Pref.	4th
2000–01	5	Reg. Pref.	3rd
2001–02	5	Reg. Pref.	2nd
2002–03	4	3ª	9th
2003–04	4	3ª	9th
2004–05	4	3ª	15th
2005–06	4	3ª	9th
2006–07	4	3ª	11th
2007–08	4	3ª	8th
2008–09	4	3ª	2nd
2009–10	4	3ª	4th
2010–11	3	2ª B	13th
2011–12	3	2ª B	13th
2012–13	3	2ª B	5th
2013–14	3	2ª B	13th
2014–15	3	2ª B	3rd
2015–16	3	2ª B	20th
2016–17	4	3ª	3rd

Season	Tier	Division	Place
2017–18	4	3ª	2nd
2018–19	3	2ª B	20th
2019–20	4	3ª	5th
2020–21	4	3ª	2nd / 5th
2021–22	5	3ª RFEF	4th
2022–23	5	3ª Fed.	9th
2023–24	5	3ª Fed.	4th
2024–25	4	2ª Fed.	6th
2025–26	4	2ª Fed.	17th
2026–27	5	3ª Fed.	

- 7 seasons in Segunda División B
- 2 seasons in Segunda Federación
- 12 seasons in Tercera División
- 4 seasons in Tercera Federación/Tercera División RFEF

== Current squad ==
As of 14 September 2026

Note: Flags indicate national team as defined under FIFA eligibility rules; some limited exceptions apply. Players may hold more than one non-FIFA nationality.

No.	Pos.	Nation	Player
1	GK	ESP	Sergio Villegas
2	DF	ESP	Dani Tomás
3	DF	SRB	Mihailo Radić (on loan from Partizan)
4	DF	ESP	Axel Espínola
5	DF	ESP	Edu Pla
6	MF	ESP	Curro
7	FW	POR	Tomazinho
8	MF	ESP	Josema Romera
9	FW	GNB	Marciano Sanca
10	MF	ESP	Joan Gázquez
11	FW	MAR	Hou Kounia
12	DF	ESP	Dani Sánchez

No.	Pos.	Nation	Player
13	GK	ESP	Jesús López
15	DF	SRB	Andrej Popović
18	DF	ARG	Isaías Rodríguez
20	DF	MLI	Ayouba Koné
21	MF	ESP	Hodei Rodríguez
22	FW	ESP	Luis Morales
23	MF	ESP	Pablo Montero
24	FW	SRB	Eldin Bajramović
25	GK	ESP	Javi Jiménez
27	MF	SRB	Niko Tomašević
33	MF	SUI	Iván Parra
—	MF	FRA	Kassoum Kone

=== From Youth Academy ===
Note: Flags indicate national team as defined under FIFA eligibility rules; some limited exceptions apply. Players may hold more than one non-FIFA nationality.

No.	Pos.	Nation	Player
26	MF	MNE	Viktor Lesjak
28	MF	IRL	Ramón Martos

=== Out on loan ===
Note: Flags indicate national team as defined under FIFA eligibility rules; some limited exceptions apply. Players may hold more than one non-FIFA nationality.

No.	Pos.	Nation	Player

== Technical staff ==
Position	Staff
Head coach	(Spain) Pablo Nozal
Assistant coach	(Spain) Ramiro García (Spain) Carlos García
Goalkeeping coach	(Spain) Ángel Férez
Team Manager	(Spain) Chico Flores
Fitness coach	(Spain) Javi Suárez
Physiotherapist	(Spain) Toni Moreno
Analyst	(Spain) Guille Jerez
Delegate	(Spain) Jesús Padilla
Field Delegate	(Spain) Jorge Peralta
Equipment Manager	(Spain) Oscar Vargas

Last updated: September 2022
Source: UD Almería

== Notable former players ==
Note: this list includes players that have appeared in at least 100 league games and/or have reached international status.

- (Burkina Faso) Jonathan Zongo
- (Ecuador) Gianfranco Gazzaniga
- (Equatorial Guinea) Gregorio
- (Equatorial Guinea) Kike Boula
- (Equatorial Guinea) Igor Engonga
- (Equatorial Guinea) Michi
- (Equatorial Guinea) Sena
- (Morocco) Hicham
- (Nigeria) Ramon Azeez
- (Nigeria) Stanley Okoro
- (Nigeria) John Ogu
- (Spain) Alberto
- (Spain) Cristóbal
- (Spain) Ángel Trujillo
- (Spain) Aleix Vidal

=== Former managers ===
See UD Almería B managers.

- (Spain) Esteban Navarro
- (Spain) Fran Fernández
- (Spain) Francisco
- (Spain) Miguel Rivera
