= 2018–19 Granada CF season =

Granada CF
2018–19 season
- President: Jiang Lizhang
- Head coach: Diego Martínez
- Stadium: Los Cármenes
- Segunda División: 2nd (promoted)
- Copa del Rey: Second round
- Top goalscorer: League: Antonio Puertas (10 goals); All: Antonio Puertas (10 goals)
Home colours	Away colours

The 2018–19 season was the 33rd season in Segunda División played by Granada CF, a Spanish football club based in Granada, Andalusia. It covers a period from 1 July 2018 to 30 June 2019.

== Squad ==
As of 1 September 2018

No.	Name	Nat.	Place of Birth	Date of Birth (Age)	Joined	Signed From	Transfer Fee	Ends
Goalkeepers
1	Rui Silva	(Portugal)	(Portugal) Maia	7 February 1994 (age 31)	2017	(Portugal) Nacional	€1M	2021
13	Javi Varas	(Spain)	(Andalusia) Seville	10 September 1982 (age 43)	2017	Las Palmas	Free	2019
25	Aarón Escandell	(Spain)	(Valencian Community) Carcaixent	27 September 1995 (age 30)	2017	Recreativo Granada	Free	2020
Defenders
3	Álex Martínez	(Spain)	(Andalusia) Seville	12 August 1990 (age 35)	2017	Betis	Free	2019
5	José Antonio Martínez	(Spain)	(Andalusia) La Palma del Condado	12 February 1993 (age 32)	2018	Eibar	Loan	2019
6	Germán Sánchez	(Spain)	(Andalusia) San Fernando	31 October 1986 (age 38)	2017	Tenerife	€100k	2019
16	Víctor Díaz	(Spain)	(Andalusia) Seville	12 June 1988 (age 37)	2017	Leganés	Free	2019
17	Quini	(Spain)	(Andalusia) Fernán Núñez	24 September 1989 (age 36)	2017	Rayo Vallecano	Free	2020
21	Pablo Vázquez	(Spain)	(Valencian Community) Gandia	7 October 1994 (age 31)	2017	Recreativo Granada	Free	2020
22	Adri Castellano	(Spain)	(Andalusia) Córdoba	26 January 1994 (age 31)	2017	Recreativo Granada	Free	2020
Midfielders
4	Fran Rico	(Spain)	(Galicia (Spain)) Sanxenxo	3 August 1987 (age 38)	2011	Real Madrid Castilla	€1M	2020
8	Fede San Emeterio	(Spain)	(Cantabria) Mazcuerras	16 March 1997 (age 28)	2018	Valladolid	Loan	2019
15	Nicolás Aguirre	(Argentina)	(Argentina) Chabás	27 June 1990 (age 35)	2018	(China) Chongqing Dangdai	Free	2019
19	Ángel Montoro	(Spain)	(Valencian Community) Valencia	25 June 1988 (age 37)	2017	Las Palmas	Free	2020
23	Alberto Martín	(Spain)	(Extremadura) Don Benito	31 March 1989 (age 36)	2017	Leganés	Free	2019
24	José Antonio González	(Spain)	(Andalusia) Puente Genil	20 December 1995 (age 29)	2017	Recreativo Granada	Free	2020
Forwards
7	Álvaro Vadillo	(Spain)	(Andalusia) Puerto Real	12 September 1994 (age 31)	2018	Huesca	Free	2020
9	Alejandro Pozo	(Spain)	(Andalusia) Huévar del Aljarafe	22 February 1999 (age 26)	2018	Sevilla Atlético	Loan	2019
10	Antonio Puertas	(Spain)	(Andalusia) Benahadux	21 February 1992 (age 33)	2017	Almería	Free	2020
11	Rodri	(Spain)	(Castile and León) Soria	6 June 1990 (age 35)	2018	Cultural Leonesa	€70k	2020
14	Fede Vico	(Spain)	(Andalusia) Córdoba	4 July 1994 (age 31)	2018	Leganés	Loan	2019
20	Adrián Ramos	(Colombia)	(Colombia) Santander de Quilichao	4 April 1989 (age 36)	2017	(China) Chongqing Dangdai	Undisclosed	2019

== Transfers ==
=== In ===
No.	Pos.	Nat.	Name	Age	EU	Moving from	Type	Transfer window	Ends	Transfer fee	Source
4	MF	(Spain)	Fran Rico	30	EU	Eibar	Loan Return	Summer	2020		
	MF	(Cameroon)	Martin Hongla	20	Non-EU	Barcelona B	Loan Return	Summer	2021		
	MF	(Spain)	Rubén Pérez	29	EU	Leganés	Loan Return	Summer	2019		
	MF	(Slovenia)	Rene Krhin	28	EU	(France) Nantes	Loan Return	Summer	2019		
	DF	(Portugal)	Luís Martins	26	EU	(Portugal) Marítimo	Loan Return	Summer	2018		
	MF	(Morocco)	Mehdi Carcela	28	EU	(Belgium) Standard Liège	Loan Return	Summer	2020		
7	MF	(Spain)	Álvaro Vadillo	23	EU	Huesca	Transfer	Summer	2020	Free	GranadaCF.es
11	FW	(Spain)	Rodri	28	EU	Cultural Leonesa	Transfer	Summer	2020	€70k	GranadaCF.es
25	GK	(Spain)	Aarón Escandell	22	EU	Recreativo Granada	Promoted	Summer	2020	Youth system	
22	DF	(Spain)	Adri Castellano	24	EU	Recreativo Granada	Promoted	Summer	2020	Youth system	GranadaCF.es
24	MF	(Spain)	José Antonio González	22	EU	Recreativo Granada	Promoted	Summer	2020	Youth system	GranadaCF.es
21	DF	(Spain)	Pablo Vázquez	23	EU	Recreativo Granada	Promoted	Summer	2020	Youth system	GranadaCF.es
15	MF	(Argentina)	Nicolás Aguirre	28	Non-EU	(China) Chongqing Dangdai	Transfer	Summer	2019	Free	GranadaCF.es
14	MF	(Spain)	Fede Vico	24	EU	Leganés	Loan	Summer	2019	Free	GranadaCF.es
5	DF	(Spain)	José Antonio Martínez	25	EU	Eibar	Loan	Summer	2019	Free	GranadaCF.es
18	MF	(Spain)	Fede San Emeterio	21	EU	Valladolid	Loan	Summer	2019	Free	GranadaCF.es
9	FW	(Spain)	Alejandro Pozo	19	EU	Sevilla Atlético	Loan	Summer	2019	Free	GranadaCF.es

=== Out ===
No.	Pos.	Nat.	Name	Age	EU	Moving to	Type	Transfer window	Transfer fee	Source
21	MF	(Denmark)	Andrew Hjulsager	23	EU	Celta	Loan Return	Summer		
9	FW	(Albania)	Rey Manaj	21	Non-EU	(Italy) Internazionale	Loan return	Summer		
14	DF	(Spain)	Urtzi Iriondo	23	EU	Athletic Bilbao	Loan Return	Summer		
24	MF	(Spain)	Javier Espinosa	25	EU	Levante	Loan return	Summer		
4	MF	(Portugal)	Salvador Agra	26	EU	(Portugal) Benfica	Loan Return	Summer		
12	MF	(Cameroon)	Pierre Kunde	22	Non-EU	Atlético Madrid	Loan Return	Summer		
	MF	(Morocco)	Mehdi Carcela	29	EU	(Belgium) Standard Liège	Transfer	Summer	€2.5M	Standard.be
	DF	(Portugal)	Luís Martins	28	EU	(Portugal) Chaves	Transfer	Summer	Free	GDChaves.pt
	MF	(Slovenia)	Rene Krhin	28	EU	(France) Nantes	Transfer	Summer	€300k	FCNantes.com
2	DF	(Spain)	Chico	31	EU	(Russia) Rubin Kazan	Transfer	Summer	Free	Rubin-Kazan.ru
15	MF	(Spain)	Pedro	31	EU	Deportivo La Coruña	Transfer	Summer	Free	RCDeportivo.es
	MF	(Spain)	Rubén Pérez	29	EU	Leganés	Transfer	Summer	Free	CDLeganes.com
11	FW	(Venezuela)	Darwin Machís	25	EU	(Italy) Udinese	Transfer	Summer	Undisclosed	Udinese.it
5	DF	(Uruguay)	Hernán Menosse	31	Non-EU	(Argentina) Belgrano	Transfer	Summer	Free	BelgranoCordoba.com
22	MF	(Peru)	Sergio Peña	22	Non-EU	(Portugal) Tondela	Loan	Summer	Free	CDTondela.pt
20	DF	(France)	Matthieu Saunier	28	EU	(France) Lorient	Transfer	Summer	€300k	FCLWeb.fr
18	FW	(Spain)	Joselu	27	EU	Oviedo	Transfer	Summer	€220k	RealOviedo.es
8	MF	(Spain)	Raúl Baena	29	EU	(Australia) Melbourne Victory	Loan	Summer	Free	AS

== Pre-season and friendlies ==
Win Draw Loss Fixtures

20 July 2018 Friendly	Marbella	0–1	Granada	Marbella
20:00 CEST		Report	Juancho 31'	Stadium: Municipal

25 July 2018 Training	Granada	2–0	Jaén	Granada
19:30 CEST	Adrián Ramos; Joselu	Report		Stadium: Ciudad Deportiva GCF

27 July 2018 Friendly	Extremadura	0–2	Granada	Marbella
19:30 CEST		Report	Puertas 35'; Raúl Baena 69' (pen.)	Stadium: Marbella Football Center; Attendance: 100

1 August 2018 Friendly	Granada	0–0	Getafe	Orihuela
19:30 CEST		Report		Stadium: Real Club de Golf Campoamor Resort; Attendance: 100

5 August 2018 Friendly	Elche	0–0	Granada	Orihuela
19:30 CEST		Report		Stadium: Real Club de Golf Campoamor Resort; Attendance: 50

6 August 2018 Friendly	Cartagena	3–2	Granada	Cartagena
21:00 CEST	Aketxe 5'; Fito Miranda 47'; Igor Paim 75'	Report	Rodri 55'; Mauro 87' (o.g.)	Stadium: Cartagonova

11 August 2018 Trofeo Ciudad de Granada	Granada	0–0 (3–4 p)	Málaga	Granada
20:00 CEST		Report		Stadium: Nuevo Los Cármenes; Attendance: 5,000
	Penalties
	Rodri (penalty missed); José Antonio (penalty scored); Germán (penalty scored); Fede Vico (penalty scored); Juancho (penalty missed)		(penalty scored) Adrián González; (penalty scored) Iván Jaime; (penalty missed) Juan Cruz; (penalty scored) Pau Torres; (penalty scored) Ricca

== Competitions ==
=== Segunda División ===
Pos	Team	Pld	W	D	L	GF	GA	GD	Pts	Promotion, qualification or relegation
1	Osasuna (C, P)	42	26	9	7	59	35	+24	87	Promotion to La Liga
2	Granada (P)	42	22	13	7	52	28	+24	79	Promotion to La Liga
3	Málaga	42	21	11	10	51	31	+20	74	Qualification to promotion play-offs
4	Albacete	42	19	14	9	54	38	+16	71	Qualification to promotion play-offs
5	Mallorca (O, P)	42	19	12	11	53	37	+16	69	Qualification to promotion play-offs

Source: La Liga
Rules for classification: 1) points; 2) head-to-head points; 3) head-to-head goal difference; 4) goal difference; 5) number of goals scored
(C) Champions; (O) Play-off winners; (P) Promoted

==== Results summary ====
Overall								Home						Away					
Pld	W	D	L	GF	GA	GD	Pts	W	D	L	GF	GA	GD	W	D	L	GF	GA	GD
34	17	10	7	40	22	+18	61	10	5	2	21	9	+12	7	5	5	19	13	+6

Last updated: 27 January 2019.
Source: LaLiga.es

==== Result round by round ====
Round	1	2	3	4	5	6	7	8	9	10	11	12	13	14	15	16	17	18	19	20	21	22	23	24	25	26	27	28	29	30	31	32	33	34	35	36	37	38	39	40	41	42
Ground	A	H	H	A	H	A	H	A	H	A	H	A	H	A	H	A	A	H	A	H	A	H	H	A	H	A	H	A	H	A	H	H	H	A	A	H	A	H	A	H	A	H
Result	D	D	W	W	W	L	W	W	W	L	W	W	D	D	L	W	W	W	D	D	D	W	D	L	L	W	W	W	W	D	D	L	W	L								
Position	15	13	7	6	3	4	2	2	2	3	2	1	1	3	4	3	1	1	1	1	1	1	1	2	5	5	3	2	2	2	2	2	2	3								

Updated to match(es) played on 27 January 2019. Source: LaLiga.es
A = Away; H = Home; W = Win; D = Draw; L = Loss

==== Matches ====
Win Draw Loss Fixtures

18 August 2018 1	Elche	0–0	Granada	Elche
19:00 CEST	Gonzalo Villar (yellow card) 41'; Gonzalo Verdú (yellow card) 76'	Report	Nicolás Aguirre (yellow card) 18'; Quini (yellow card) 82'; Álex Martínez (yellow card) 90+1'	Stadium: Martínez Valero; Attendance: 11,026; Referee: Santiago Varón Aceitón

26 August 2018 2	Granada	1–1	Lugo	Granada
20:30 CEST	Antonio Puertas 27'; Fede Vico (yellow card) 37'; Quini (yellow card) 58'; Vadillo (yellow card) 90+1'	Report	Bernardo (yellow card) 19'; Fernando Seoane (yellow card) 62'; Kravets (yellow card) 68'; Lazo 74'	Stadium: Nuevo Los Cármenes; Attendance: 8,321; Referee: Aitor Gorostegui Fernández-Ortega

2 September 2018 3	Granada	2–0	Osasuna	Granada
18:00 CEST	Adrián Ramos 7'; Pozo (yellow card) 53'; Vadillo 62' (pen.); Víctor Díaz (yellow card) 86'	Report	Oier (yellow card) 70'	Stadium: Nuevo Los Cármenes; Attendance: 8,727; Referee: Daniel Jesús Trujillo Suárez

9 September 2018 4	Extremadura	1–3	Granada	Almendralejo
18:00 CEST	Pardo (yellow card) 6'; Kike Márquez (yellow card) 29'; Álex Barrera (yellow card) 38'; Enric Gallego 59'	Report	Antonio Puertas 3', 67' (yellow card) 30'; Quini (yellow card) 43'; Fede San Emeterio (yellow card) 55'; Montoro (yellow card) 87'; Pozo 89'	Stadium: Francisco de la Hera; Attendance: 9,343; Referee: José Antonio López Toca

16 September 2018 5	Granada	3–0	Rayo Majadahonda	Granada
20:00 CEST	Antonio Puertas 21', 64'; Martínez 45'; Fede Vico (yellow card) 74'	Report	Enzo (yellow card) 4'; Rafa (yellow card) 27'; Luso (yellow card) 33'; Iza Carcelén (yellow card) 89'	Stadium: Nuevo Los Cármenes; Attendance: 9,100; Referee: Rubén Ávalos Barrera

24 September 2018 6	Deportivo La Coruña	2–1	Granada	A Coruña
21:00 CEST	Quique 68' (pen.), 77'; Pablo Marí (yellow card) 89'	Report	Montoro 90+1'	Stadium: Abanca-Riazor; Attendance: 13,822; Referee: Álvaro Moreno Aragón

29 September 2018 7	Granada	4–2	Córdoba	Granada
18:00 CEST	Fede Vico 7'; Vadillo 20'; Montoro 54'; Rodri (yellow card) 90' (goal) 90+3'	Report	Piovaccari (yellow card) 10'; Jaime (yellow card) 39'; Jovanović (yellow card) 41'; Aythami 50'; Quezada (yellow card) 51'; Bambock 85'	Stadium: Nuevo Los Cármenes; Attendance: 9,965; Referee: Valentín Pizarro Gómez

7 October 2018 8	Reus	1–2	Granada	Reus
12:00 CEST	Gus Ledes (yellow card) 45'; Linares 49'; Ángel Bastos (yellow card) 68'	Report	Víctor Díaz 28'; Aarón (yellow card) 51'; Antonio Puertas 75'; Montoro (yellow card) 86'; Rui Silva (yellow card) 90+2'	Stadium: Municipal; Attendance: 2,475; Referee: David Pérez Pallas

14 October 2018 9	Granada	1–0	Mallorca	Granada
20:45 CEST	Pozo 31'; Antonio Puertas (yellow card) 65'; Víctor Díaz (yellow card) 71'	Report	Manolo Reina (yellow card) 36'; Salva Sevilla (yellow card) 65'; Gámez (yellow card) 76'; Álex López (yellow card) 90+1'	Stadium: Nuevo Los Cármenes; Attendance: 9,479; Referee: Juan Luis Pulido Santana

20 October 2018 10	Alcorcón	1–0	Granada	Alcorcón
18:00 CEST	Eddy Silvestre (yellow card) 36'; Nono (yellow card) 42'; Juan Muñoz 58' (pen.)	Report	Víctor Díaz (red card) 59'; Adrián Ramos (yellow card) 57'; Álex Martínez (yellow card) 57'; Montoro (yellow card) 68'; Fede Vico (yellow card) 90+5'	Stadium: Santo Domingo; Attendance: 2,946; Referee: Isidro Díaz de Mera Escuderos

27 October 2018 11	Granada	1–0	Almería	Granada
18:00 CEST	Antonio Puertas (yellow card) 44'; Rodri (yellow card) 44'; Germán (yellow card) 45'; Pozo 89'; Montoro (yellow card) 90+2'	Report	Juan Carlos (yellow card) 45'; Eteki (yellow card) 68'	Stadium: Nuevo Los Cármenes; Attendance: 10,254; Referee: Dámaso Arcediano Monescillo

4 November 2018 12	Real Zaragoza	0–2	Granada	Zaragoza
20:30 CET	Alberto Benito (yellow card) 37' (yellow-red card) 43'; Álvarez (yellow card) 45+1'	Summary	Fede Vico 16'; Álvaro Vadillo 38'; Fede (yellow card) 47'; Montoro (yellow card) 62'	Stadium: La Romareda; Attendance: 19,368; Referee: Iñaki Bikandi Garrido

11 November 2018 13	Granada	0–0	Numancia	Granada
12:00 CET	Aguirre (yellow card) 69'; Diego Martínez (red card) 90+5'	Summary	Pichu Atienza (yellow card) 42'; Yeboah (yellow card) 61' (yellow-red card) 70'; Diamanka (yellow card) 69'; Alejandro Sanz (yellow card) 72'; Jordi Sánchez (yellow card) 86'; Aritz López Garai (red card) 90+5'	Stadium: Nuevo Los Cármenes; Attendance: 13,364; Referee: Javier Iglesias Villanueva

16 November 2018 14	Las Palmas	2–2	Granada	Las Palmas
21:00 WET, CET	Rubén Castro 43'; Araujo 79'; Cala (yellow card) 81'	Summary	Ramos 50'; Rodri 86'	Stadium: Gran Canaria; Attendance: 12,056; Referee: Victor Areces Franco

23 November 2018 15	Granada	1–2	Sporting Gijón	Granada
21:00 CET	Ramos (yellow card) 43' (goal) 83'; Germán Sánchez (yellow card) 55'; José Martínez (yellow card) 80'; Montoro (yellow card) 85'; Alejandro Pozo (yellow card) 90+2'; Aguirre (yellow card) 90+4'	Summary	Cofie 14' (yellow card) 28'; Peybernes (yellow card) 43'; Nacho Méndez (yellow card) 83'; Pablo Pérez (yellow card) 86'; Traver 90+3'	Stadium: Nuevo Los Cármenes; Attendance: 10,076; Referee: Daniel Ocón Arriaz

1 December 2018 16	Málaga	0–1	Granada	Málaga
18:00 CET	Diego González (yellow card) 78'; Hakšabanović (yellow card) 90+1'	Summary	Montoro 54' (yellow card) 69'; Rui Silva (yellow card) 84'	Stadium: La Rosaleda; Attendance: 22,988; Referee: César Soto Grado

8 December 2018 17	Gimnàstic	0–1	Granada	Tarragona
16:00 CET	Manu Barreiro (yellow card) 61'; Luis Suárez (yellow card) 77'; Albentosa (yellow card) 90+2'	Summary	Fede (yellow card) 27'; Alejandro Pozo 35'; Montoro (yellow card) 51'	Stadium: Nou Estadi; Attendance: 8,625; Referee: Gorka Sagues

15 December 2018 18	Granada	1–0	Oviedo	Granada
16:00 CET	Alejandro Pozo (yellow card) 25'; Antonio Puertas (yellow card) 49'; Ramos 83'	Summary	Champagne (yellow card) 68'; Mossa (yellow card) 89'	Stadium: Nuevo Los Cármenes; Attendance: 10,373; Referee: David Pérez

21 December 2018 19	Tenerife	1–1	Granada	Santa Cruz de Tenerife
19:00 CET	Jorge Sáenz (yellow card) 86'; Joao Rodríguez 90+2' (yellow card) 90+3'	Summary	Antonio Puertas 10' (yellow card) 51'; Quini (yellow card) 21'; Ramos (yellow card) 45'	Stadium: Heliodoro Rodríguez López; Attendance: 8,952; Referee: Valentín Pizarro

4 January 2019 20	Granada	1–1	Albacete	Granada
21:00 CET	Germán Sánchez (yellow card) 23'; Montoro (yellow card) 41'; Fede Vico 76' (pen.)	Summary	Bela 63' (yellow card) 76'	Stadium: Nuevo Los Cármenes; Attendance: 11,991; Referee: Víctor Areces

11 January 2019 21	Cádiz	0–0	Granada	Cádiz
21:00 CET		Summary	José Martínez (yellow card) 44'	Stadium: Ramón de Carranza; Attendance: 12,606; Referee: Juan Pulido

21 January 2019 22	Granada	2–1	Elche	Granada
21:00 CET	Montoro 17' (yellow card) 42' (goal) 44'; Fede (yellow card) 25'	Summary	González (yellow card) 29'; Gonzalo Verdú (yellow card) 36'; Xavi Torres 71' (pen.); Kaba (yellow card) 90+2'	Stadium: Nuevo Los Cármenes; Attendance: 8,328; Referee: César Soto

27 January 2019 23	Granada	0–0	Extremadura	Granada
16:00 CET	Ramos (yellow card) 31'; Fede (red card) 38'; Dani Ojeda (yellow card) 84'; Álvaro Vadillo (yellow card) 85'	Summary	Kike (yellow card) 27'	Stadium: Nuevo Los Cármenes; Attendance: 11,436; Referee: Isidro Díaz de Mera

3 February 2019 24	Osasuna	v	Granada	Pamplona
18:00 CET				Stadium: El Sadar

=== Copa del Rey ===
==== Second round ====
Win Draw Loss Fixtures

13 September 2018	Elche	2–1	Granada	Elche
22:00 CEST	Jony 41' (pen.); Tekio (yellow card) 56'; Provencio 68'	Report	Adri Castellano (yellow card) 30' (yellow-red card) 38'; Nico Aguirre (yellow card) 40'; Juancho (yellow card) 57'; Rodri (yellow card) 70'; Víctor Díaz (yellow card) 80'; Pablo Vázquez 81'	Stadium: Martínez Valero; Referee: Gorka Sagués Oscoz

== Statistics ==
=== Appearances and goals ===
Last updated on 6 April 2019

No.	Pos	Nat	Player	Total		Segunda División		Copa del Rey	
No.	Pos	Nat	Player	Apps	Goals	Apps	Goals	Apps	Goals
Goalkeepers
1	GK	(Portugal) POR	Rui Silva	32	0	32	0	0	0
13	GK	(Spain) ESP	Javi Varas	0	0	0	0	0	0
25	GK	(Spain) ESP	Aarón Escandell	1	0	0	0	1	0
Defenders
2	DF	(Spain) ESP	Bernardo	1	0	1	0	0	0
3	DF	(Spain) ESP	Álex Martínez	16	0	16	0	0	0
5	DF	(Spain) ESP	José Antonio Martínez	30	1	28+1	1	1	0
6	DF	(Spain) ESP	Germán Sánchez	30	1	30	1	0	0
16	DF	(Spain) ESP	Víctor Díaz	31	1	30	1	0+1	0
17	DF	(Spain) ESP	Quini	24	1	18+5	1	1	0
22	DF	(Spain) ESP	Adri Castellano	7	0	5+1	0	1	0
Midfielders
4	MF	(Spain) ESP	Fran Rico	0	0	0	0	0	0
7	MF	(Spain) ESP	Álvaro Vadillo	32	3	31+1	3	0	0
8	MF	(Spain) ESP	Fede San Emeterio	28	0	27+1	0	0	0
9	MF	(Spain) ESP	Alejandro Pozo	25	4	12+12	4	1	0
10	MF	(Spain) ESP	Antonio Puertas	31	10	19+11	10	0+1	0
12	MF	(Nigeria) NGA	Ramon Azeez	7	0	2+5	0	0	0
14	MF	(Spain) ESP	Fede Vico	33	4	27+5	4	1	0
15	MF	(Argentina) ARG	Nicolás Aguirre	16	0	3+12	0	1	0
19	MF	(Spain) ESP	Ángel Montoro	28	5	27+1	5	0	0
23	MF	(Spain) ESP	Alberto Martín	11	0	4+6	0	1	0
24	MF	(Spain) ESP	José Antonio González	5	0	1+3	0	1	0
Forwards
11	FW	(Spain) ESP	Rodri	26	2	10+15	2	0+1	0
18	FW	(Spain) ESP	Dani Ojeda	10	1	7+3	1	0	0
20	FW	(Colombia) COL	Adrián Ramos	30	4	22+8	4	0	0
26	FW	(Colombia) COL	Juancho	6	0	0+5	0	1	0
Players who have made an appearance this season but have left the club
21	DF	(Spain) ESP	Pablo Vázquez	1	1	0	0	1	1
