= Derby of eastern Andalusia =

Recurring football fixture

- Other names: Derbi Oriental; Derbi Andaluz
- Location: Andalusia
- Teams: Granada; Málaga
- Latest meeting: February 28, 2026; 2025–26 Segunda División; Granada 0–1 Málaga
- Next meeting: TBC; TBC; TBC
- Stadiums: Los Cármenes (Granada); La Rosaleda (Málaga)

Statistics
- Most wins: Granada (34)
- Top scorer: Youssef El Arabi (6 goals)
- Largest victory: Málaga 5–0 Granada (20 February 1949)

The Derby of eastern Andalusia also known as the Andalucía Oriental derby (the Derbi Andaluz, the Derbi Oriental) is the name of a running football club rivalry in the Eastern Andalusia region, Spain, between Málaga CF (previously CD Málaga) and Granada CF.

== History ==
The first official match between these two clubs was at the Campo de Las Tablas, on December 10, 1933 during the 1933–34 season of the Tercera División, when Recreativo de Granada (Granada's former name) beat CD Malacitano (CD Málaga's former name) 3–1.

Although CD Málaga disbanded, both CD Málaga and Málaga CF are considered to be the same club. Málaga CF merged with the CD Málaga reserve team, Atlético Malagueño, competing as an independent team from the 1992–93 season of the Tercera División. The official statement from Málaga CF is that the club is still the same as CD Málaga.

== List of matches in official competition ==
#	Season	Date	Home team	Score	Away team	Competition	Home goal scorers	Away goal scorers
1	1933–34	10 December 1933	C.D. Malacitano	1 – 2	Recreativo Granada	Tercera	–	Calderón x2
2	1933–34	31 December 1933	Recreativo Granada	3 – 1	C.D. Malacitano	Tercera	–	–
3	1934	28 October 1934	C.D. Malacitano	2 – 1	Recreativo Granada	Segunda Play-off	–	–
4	1934	18 November 1934	Recreativo Granada	2 – 1	C.D. Malacitano	Segunda Play-off	–	–
5	1934–35	23 December 1934	Recreativo Granada	2 – 1	C.D. Malacitano	Segunda	Calderón, Luque	Latorre
6	1934–35	10 February 1935	C.D. Malacitano	3 – 1	Recreativo Granada	Segunda	Crespo, Tomasín, Larrusquín	Victorio
7	1935–36	1 December 1935	C.D. Malacitano	2 – 1	Recreativo Granada	Segunda	Junco x2	Barrios
8	1935–36	19 January 1936	Recreativo Granada	2 – 0	C.D. Malacitano	Segunda	Josa, Del Toro	
9	1935–36	23 February 1936	C.D. Malacitano	2 – 1	Recreativo Granada	Copa del Rey Play-Off	Meri, Cotelo	Luque
10	1935–36	15 March 1936	Recreativo Granada	2 – 0	C.D. Malacitano	Copa del Rey Play-Off	Luque, Calderón	
11	1939–40	3 December 1939	Recreativo Granada	1 – 0	C.D. Malacitano	Segunda	Trompi	
12	1939–40	21 January 1940	C.D. Malacitano	2 – 0	Recreativo Granada	Segunda	Tomasín, Chacho	
13	1940–41	8 December 1940	Granada C.F.	0 – 1	C.D. Malacitano	Segunda		Fuentes
14	1940–41	2 March 1941	C.D. Malacitano	3 – 0	Granada C.F.	Segunda	Perilla x2, Meri (p.)	
15	1941–42	26 April 1942	C.D. Málaga	2 – 4	Granada C.F.	Copa del Rey R1	Fuentes, Meri	Marín, César x3
16	1941–42	3 May 1942	Granada C.F.	2 – 1	C.D. Málaga	Copa del Rey R1	Marín x2	Meri
17	1946–47	15 December 1946	C.D. Málaga	0 – 0	Granada C.F.	Segunda		
18	1946–47	13 April 1947	Granada C.F.	4 – 2	C.D. Málaga	Segunda	Almagro x2, Trompi, Sosa	Roldán, Ubis
19	1947–48	30 November 1947	Granada C.F.	1 – 3	C.D. Málaga	Segunda	Millán	Teo, Muruaga x2
20	1947–48	7 March 1948	C.D. Málaga	2 – 2	Granada C.F.	Segunda	Bazán x2	Morales x2
21	1948–49	1 November 1948	Granada C.F.	1 – 0	C.D. Málaga	Segunda	Morales	
22	1948–49	20 February 1949	C.D. Málaga	5 – 0	Granada C.F.	Segunda	Jimeno x2, Bazán, Elzo x2	
23	1951–52	16 December 1951	Granada C.F.	1 – 3	C.D. Málaga	Segunda	Chaves	Rodríguez x3
24	1951–52	13 April 1952	C.D. Málaga	5 – 1	Granada C.F.	Segunda	Sáenz (o.g.), Rodríguez, Bazán x3	Requena
25	1953–54	6 December 1953	Granada C.F.	1 – 0	C.D. Málaga	Segunda	Rafa	
26	1953–54	4 April 1954	C.D. Málaga	1 – 2	Granada C.F.	Segunda	Juan	Sueza, Rius
27	1955–56	18 September 1955	Granada C.F.	2 – 2	C.D. Málaga	Segunda	Cea x2	Madariaga, Romero
28	1955–56	22 January 1956	C.D. Málaga	2 – 1	Granada C.F.	Segunda	Lasa, Gutiérrez	Rius
29	1956–57	20 January 1957	C.D. Málaga	1 – 0	Granada C.F.	Segunda	Borredá	
30	1956–57	16 June 1957	Granada C.F.	2 – 3	C.D. Málaga	Segunda	Igoa, Vidal	Patricio, Emilio Álvarez x2
31	1961–62	10 September 1961	Granada C.F.	1 – 1	C.D. Málaga	Segunda	Rafa	Bernardi (p.)
32	1961–62	31 December 1961	C.D. Málaga	2 – 0	Granada C.F.	Segunda	Pipi x2	
33	1963–64	8 December 1963	C.D. Málaga	1 – 1	Granada C.F.	Segunda	Chuzo	Román
34	1963–64	22 March 1964	Granada C.F.	4 – 1	C.D. Málaga	Segunda	Chapela x2, Pirri x2	Otiñano
35	1964–65	20 September 1964	C.D. Málaga	1 – 1	Granada C.F.	Segunda	Manuel Velázquez	Pepe Arias (o.g.)
36	1964–65	10 January 1965	Granada C.F.	2 – 2	C.D. Málaga	Segunda	Román, Almagro	Aragón, Pepe Arias
37	1965–66	15 May 1966	Granada C.F.	2 – 1	C.D. Málaga	La Liga Play-off	Santos, Miguel	Otiñano
38	1965–66	22 May 1966	C.D. Málaga	1 – 1	Granada C.F.	La Liga Play-off	Aragón	Eloy
39	1968–69	24 November 1968	Granada C.F.	2 – 0	C.D. Málaga	La Liga	Miralles, Vicente	
40	1968–69	15 March 1969	C.D. Málaga	0 – 0	Granada C.F.	La Liga		
41	1968–69	18 May 1969	Granada C.F.	2 – 1	C.D. Málaga	Copa del Rey QF	Barrios, Vicente (p.)	Fleitas (p.)
42	1968–69	25 May 1969	C.D. Málaga	1 – 1	Granada C.F.	Copa del Rey QF	Cabral	Lara
43	1970–71	15 November 1970	Granada C.F.	1 – 1	C.D. Málaga	La Liga	Barrios	Viberti
44	1970–71	7 March 1971	C.D. Málaga	1 – 0	Granada C.F.	La Liga	Pons	
45	1971–72	5 September 1971	Granada C.F.	2 – 0	C.D. Málaga	La Liga	Jaén, Lasa	
46	1971–72	23 January 1972	C.D. Málaga	1 – 0	Granada C.F.	La Liga	Vilanova	
47	1972–73	12 November 1972	C.D. Málaga	3 – 0	Granada C.F.	La Liga	Vilanova, Toni (o.g.), Roldán	
48	1972–73	1 April 1973	Granada C.F.	2 – 0	C.D. Málaga	La Liga	Teófilo Dueñas x2	
49	1973–74	4 November 1973	Granada C.F.	0 – 0	C.D. Málaga	La Liga		
50	1973–74	17 March 1974	C.D. Málaga	1 – 1	Granada C.F.	La Liga	Vilanova	Castellanos
51	1974–75	22 December 1974	Granada C.F.	1 – 0	C.D. Málaga	La Liga	Toni Grande	
52	1974–75	1 May 1975	C.D. Málaga	1 – 1	Granada C.F.	La Liga	Raúl Castronovo	Lorenzo
53	1977–78	18 September 1977	Granada C.F.	1 – 0	C.D. Málaga	Segunda	Serrano	
54	1977–78	22 January 1978	C.D. Málaga	2 – 2	Granada C.F.	Segunda	Aráez (p.), Orozco	José Luis, Calera
55	1978–79	17 December 1978	Granada C.F.	2 – 1	C.D. Málaga	Segunda	José Luis, Serrano	Aráez
56	1978–79	19 May 1979	C.D. Málaga	2 – 0	Granada C.F.	Segunda	Orozco, Migueli	
57	1980–81	5 October 1980	Granada C.F.	0 – 0	C.D. Málaga	Segunda		
58	1980–81	19 November 1980	Granada C.F.	2 – 0	C.D. Málaga	Copa del Rey R2	Carrión, Jorgoso	
59	1980–81	3 December 1980	C.D. Málaga	2 – 1	Granada C.F.	Copa del Rey R2	Canillas, Muñoz Pérez	Angulo
60	1980–81	15 February 1981	C.D. Málaga	2 – 0	Granada C.F.	Segunda	Popo, Felix Nieto	
61	1986–87	17 September 1986	Granada C.F.	0 – 1	C.D. Málaga	Copa del Rey R1		Mario Husillos
62	1987–88	3 January 1988	Granada C.F.	1 – 1	C.D. Málaga	Segunda	Manolo	José Hurtado
63	1987–88	30 April 1988	C.D. Málaga	1 – 0	Granada C.F.	Segunda	José Hurtado	
64	1993–94	19 December 1993	Atlético Malagueño	0 – 0	Granada C.F.	Segunda B		
65	1993–94	24 April 1994	Granada C.F.	2 – 2	Málaga C.F.	Segunda B	Pepe Mel (p.), Paquito	Serviá x2
66	1995–96	12 November 1995	Granada C.F.	1 – 0	Málaga C.F.	Segunda B	Oti (p.)	
67	1995–96	7 April 1996	Málaga C.F.	0 – 1	Granada C.F.	Segunda B		Fenoll
68	1996–97	29 January 1997	Málaga C.F.	0 – 0	Granada C.F.	Segunda B		
69	1996–97	11 May 1997	Granada C.F.	1 – 1	Málaga C.F.	Segunda B	Berruezo (p.)	Pablo
70	1997–98	5 October 1997	Granada C.F.	1 – 0	Málaga C.F.	Segunda B	Berruezo (p.)	
71	1997–98	15 February 1998	Málaga C.F.	0 – 0	Granada C.F.	Segunda B		
72	2011–12	12 September 2011	Málaga C.F.	4 – 0	Granada C.F.	La Liga	Cazorla x2, Joaquín x2	
73	2011–12	6 February 2012	Granada C.F.	2 – 1	Málaga C.F.	La Liga	Ighalo, Íñigo López	Rondón
74	2012–13	8 December 2012	Málaga C.F.	4 – 0	Granada C.F.	La Liga	Joaquín, Saviola, Camacho, Santa Cruz	
75	2012–13	5 May 2013	Granada C.F.	1 – 0	Málaga C.F.	La Liga	Ighalo	
76	2013–14	8 November 2013	Granada C.F.	3 – 1	Málaga C.F.	La Liga	El-Arabi x3	Juanmi
77	2013–14	6 April 2014	Málaga C.F.	4 – 1	Granada C.F.	La Liga	Camacho x2, Amrabat, Juanmi	El-Arabi
78	2014–15	4 October 2014	Málaga C.F.	2 – 1	Granada C.F.	La Liga	Santa Cruz, Antunes (p.)	El-Arabi
79	2014–15	7 March 2015	Granada C.F.	1 – 0	Málaga C.F.	La Liga	Camacho (o.g.)	
80	2015–16	28 November 2015	Málaga C.F.	2 – 2	Granada C.F.	La Liga	Charles, Fornals	El-Arabi, Rochina
81	2015–16	8 April 2016	Granada C.F.	0 – 0	Málaga C.F.	La Liga		
82	2016–17	9 December 2016	Málaga C.F.	1 – 1	Granada C.F.	La Liga	Camacho	Kravets
83	2016–17	25 April 2017	Granada C.F.	0 – 2	Málaga C.F.	La Liga		Sandro x2
84	2018–19	1 December 2018	Málaga C.F.	0 – 1	Granada C.F.	Segunda		Montoro
85	2018–19	6 April 2019	Granada C.F.	1 – 0	Málaga C.F.	Segunda	Antonio Puertas	
86	2020–21	17 January 2021	Málaga C.F.	1 – 2	Granada C.F.	Copa del Rey Ro32	Caye Quintana	Fede Vico, Jorge Molina
87	2022–23	8 December 2022	Málaga C.F.	1 – 1	Granada C.F.	Segunda	Rubén Castro	José Callejón
88	2022–23	27 February 2023	Granada C.F.	1 – 0	Málaga C.F.	Segunda	Sergio Ruiz	
89	2024–25	20 September 2024	Granada C.F.	2 – 2	Málaga C.F.	Segunda	Carlos Neva, Myrto Uzuni	Antoñito, Nélson Monte
90	2024–25	3 May 2025	Málaga C.F.	1 – 0	Granada C.F.	Segunda	Antoñito (p.)	
91	2025–26	6 September 2025	Málaga C.F.	2 – 2	Granada C.F.	Segunda	Chupete x2	Casadesús, Pedro Alemañ
92	2025–26	28 February 2026	Granada C.F.	0 – 1	Málaga C.F.	Segunda		David Larrubia

== Head to head results ==
Updated to derby #92 played on February 28, 2026.

Competition	Played	Granada wins	Draws	Málaga wins	Granada goals	Málaga goals
La Liga	24	8	8	8	22	29
La Liga Play-off	2	1	1	0	3	2
Segunda	44	13	13	18	48	65
Segunda Play-off	2	1	0	1	3	3
Segunda B	8	3	5	0	6	3
Tercera	2	2	0	0	5	2
Copa del Rey	10	6	1	3	17	11
Overall	92	34	28	30	104	115
