= 2015 Copa del Rey Juvenil =

Tournament details
- Country: Spain
- Teams: 16

Final positions
- Champions: Rayo Vallecano
- Runners-up: Real Madrid

Tournament statistics
- Matches played: 24
- Goals scored: 75 (3.13 per match)

The 2015 Copa del Rey Juvenil was the 65th staging of the Copa del Rey Juvenil de Fútbol. The competition began on May 17, 2015 and ended on the week of June 27 with the final at the Estadio Alfonso Murube in Ceuta.

== First round ==
The top two teams from each group and the two best third-placed teams are drawn into a two-game best aggregate score series. The first leg was played on May 17 and the return leg on May 24.

Team 1	Agg.	Team 2	1st leg	2nd leg
Athletic	0–6	Celta	0–4	0–2
Deportivo	4–6	Real Sociedad	2–1	2–5
Las Palmas	1–1 (5–4 p)	Getafe	1–0	0–1
Real Madrid	8–0	Laguna	7–0	1–0
Tenerife	2–5	Rayo Vallecano	1–1	1–4
Málaga	3–5	Damm	2–2	1–3
Espanyol	1–3	Valencia	1–0	0–3
Villarreal	5–3	Sevilla	3–0	2–3

== Quarterfinal ==
The eight winners from the first round advance to quarterfinal for a two-game series best aggregate score with the first leg will be played on May 31 and the return leg on June 7.

Team 1	Agg.	Team 2	1st leg	2nd leg
Real Sociedad	4–5	Celta	2–1	2–4
Villarreal	1–4	Real Madrid	0–1	1–3
Rayo Vallecano	3–2	Damm	2–1	1–1
Valencia	3–0	Las Palmas	1–0	2–0

== Semifinal ==
The four winners play a two-game series best aggregate score beginning the week of June 14 and returning the week of June 21.

Team 1	Agg.	Team 2	1st leg	2nd leg
Real Madrid	5–3	Valencia	4–1	1–2
Rayo Vallecano	4–3	Celta	3–1	1–2

== Final ==
The semifinal winners play a one-game final at the Estadio Alfonso Murube in Ceuta beginning the week of June 28.

=== Details ===
27 June 2015
19:15 CEST (UTC+02:00)

Real Madrid	1 – 2	Rayo Vallecano
Lienhart 31'	report	Uche 25'; Kike 68'

Alfonso Murube, Ceuta
Referee: Ramón Arias Madrid (Ceuta)

Real Madrid	Rayo Vallecano

REAL MADRID:
GK	1	(Spain) David Oliveros
DF	2	(Spain) Álvaro Tejero		(substituted off) 84'
DF	4	(Austria) Philipp Lienhart
DF	5	(Spain) Sergio Reguilón	(yellow card) 77'
DF	3	(Dominican Republic) Luismi Quezada
MF	6	(Spain) Arturo (c)
MF	8	(Spain) Aleix Febas		(substituted off) 84'
MF	7	(Spain) Cristian Cedrés		(substituted off) 56'
MF	10	(Spain) Borja Sánchez		(substituted off) 63'
MF	11	(Spain) José Carlos Lazo
FW	9	(Spain) Borja Mayoral	(red card) 92'
Substitutes:
GK	13	(Spain) Marcos Lavín
DF	12	(Chile) Benjamín Kuscevic		(substituted on) 84'
MF	14	(Spain) Garci		(substituted on) 84'
MF	15	(Spain) Ganfornina		(substituted on) 63'
FW	16	(Brazil) Jean Carlos		(substituted on) 56'
Manager: (Spain) Luis Miguel Ramis

RAYO VALLECANO
GK	1	(Spain) Javi Ruiz
DF	2	(Spain) Rubén Quirós	(yellow card) 37'
DF	4	(Spain) Luis Poblete	(yellow card) 92'
DF	5	(Spain) Nico		(substituted off) 81'
DF	3	(Equatorial Guinea) Sergio Akieme	(yellow card) 28'
MF	6	(Spain) Pablo Clavería (c)	(yellow card) 77' (red card) 94'
MF	10	(Spain) Pep Biel		(substituted off) 72'
MF	8	(Spain) Kike	(yellow card) 81'
FW	7	(Colombia) Juancho
FW	9	(Spain) Raúl Uche		(substituted off) 86'
FW	11	(Spain) Jorge Shafa		(substituted off) 39'
Substitutes:
GK	13	(Spain) Álvaro
MF	12	(Spain) Álex Viso	(yellow card) 89'	(substituted on) 81'
MF	14	(Spain) Joni Montiel		(substituted on) 39'
MF	15	(Argentina) Franchu		(substituted on) 72'
FW	16	(Spain) Álex Pajuelo		(substituted on) 86'
Manager: Diego Merino

Copa del Rey
Winners
Rayo Vallecano

== See also ==
- 2014–15 División de Honor Juvenil de Fútbol
