= Alejandro Pozo =

Spanish footballer (born 1999)

Personal information
- Full name: Alejandro Pozo Pozo
- Date of birth: 22 February 1999 (age 27)
- Place of birth: Huévar del Aljarafe, Spain
- Height: 1.73 m (5 ft 8 in)
- Position: Right-back

Team information
- Current team: ADO Den Haag
- Number: 24

Youth career
- Sevilla

Senior career*
Years	Team	Apps	(Gls)
2016–2018	Sevilla B	70	(5)
2018–2022	Sevilla	3	(0)
2018–2019	→ Granada (loan)	30	(4)
2020	→ Mallorca (loan)	19	(1)
2020–2021	→ Eibar (loan)	30	(0)
2021–2022	→ Almería (loan)	39	(3)
2022–2026	Almería	81	(2)
2025–2026	→ Jagiellonia Białystok (loan)	33	(2)
2026–	ADO Den Haag	3	(0)

International career
2015–2016	Spain U16	4	(0)
2016–2018	Spain U19	13	(1)
2018–2021	Spain U21	9	(0)
2021	Spain	1	(0)
- * Club domestic league appearances and goals as of 23:05, 24 October 2026 (UTC)

Alejandro "Álex" Pozo Pozo (born 22 February 1999) is a Spanish professional footballer who plays for Eredivisie club ADO Den Haag. Mainly a right winger, he can also play as a right back.

== Club career ==
Born in Huévar del Aljarafe, Seville, Andalusia, Pozo played youth football for Sevilla FC. On 21 August 2016, aged only 17, he made his professional debut with the reserves by coming on as a late substitute for Ivi in a 3–3 Segunda División home draw against Girona FC.

Pozo scored his first professional goal on 22 October 2016, netting the equalizer in a 2–1 away win against CD Numancia. On 20 August 2018, after suffering relegation with the B-team, he joined fellow second division side Granada CF on a one-year loan deal.

Pozo was regularly utilized for the Nazaríes during the campaign, contributing with four goals in 30 appearances as his side returned to the top tier. On 27 August 2019, he renewed his contract with Sevilla until 2023, being definitely promoted to the main squad.

Pozo made his La Liga debut on 29 September 2019, replacing Lucas Ocampos in a 3–2 home win against Real Sociedad. The following 15 January, after featuring rarely, he was loaned to fellow top-tier club RCD Mallorca for the remainder of the season.

On 5 October 2020, Pozo was loaned to fellow top tier side SD Eibar for the 2020–21 campaign, along with teammate Bryan Gil. On 31 August of the following year, he moved to UD Almería in the second tier on a one-year loan deal, with a buyout clause.

On 6 June 2022, after Almería's promotion to the top tier as champions, Pozo signed a permanent five-year contract with the club. On 15 July 2025, he moved abroad for the first time in his career, after agreeing to a one-year loan deal with Polish Ekstraklasa side Jagiellonia Białystok.

Upon returning to the Rojiblancos, Pozo terminated his link with the club on 1 September 2026.

On 16 September 2026, it was announced that he had signed a two season contract with Eredivisie club ADO Den Haag until the end of the 2027–28 season, with the option of extending for a third season.

== International career ==
Due to the isolation of some national team players following the positive COVID-19 test of Sergio Busquets, Spain's under-21 squad were called up for the international friendly against Lithuania on 8 June 2021. Pozo made his senior debut in the match as Spain won 4–0.

== Career statistics ==
=== Club ===
As of match played 24 October 2026

Appearances and goals by club, season and competition
Club	Season	League			National cup (Note: Includes Copa del Rey, Polish Cup)		Continental		Other		Total	
Club	Season	Division	Apps	Goals	Apps	Goals	Apps	Goals	Apps	Goals	Apps	Goals
Granada (loan)	2018–19	Segunda División	30	4	1	0	—		—		31	4
Sevilla	2019–20	La Liga	3	0	1	0	6 (Note: Appearances in UEFA Europa League)	0	—		10	0
Mallorca (loan)	2019–20	La Liga	19	1	1	0	—		—		20	1
Eibar (loan)	2020–21	La Liga	30	0	2	0	—		—		32	0
Almeria (loan)	2021–22	Segunda División	39	3	1	0	—		—		40	3
Almeria	2022–23	La Liga	30	0	1	0	—		—		31	0
Almeria	2023–24	La Liga	21	0	2	0	—		—		23	0
Almeria	2024–25	Segunda División	30	2	4	0	—		2 (Note: Appearance(s) in Segunda División promotion play-offs)	0	36	2
Almeria	Total		120	5	8	0	0	0	2	0	130	5
Jagiellonia Białystok (loan)	2025–26	Ekstraklasa	33	2	2	0	14 (Note: Appearances in UEFA Conference League)	0	—		49	2
ADO Den Haag	2026–27	Eredivisie	3	0	1	0	—		—		4	0
Career total			238	12	16	0	20	0	2	0	276	12

=== International ===
As of match played 8 June 2021

Appearances and goals by national team and year
National team	Year	Apps	Goals
Spain	2021	1	0
Total		1	0

== Honours ==
Sevilla

- UEFA Europa League: 2019–20

Almería

- Segunda División: 2021–22
