= La Algaba =

Coordinates: 37°27′N 6°00′W

- Municipality
- Flag Coat of arms
- Interactive map of La Algaba
- Country: Spain
- Province: Seville

Area
  - Total: 18 km^{2} (6.9 sq mi)
- Elevation: 11 m (36 ft)

Population (2025-01-01)
  - Total: 16,803
  - Density: 930/km^{2} (2,400/sq mi)
- Demonym(s): Algabeño, Algabeña
- Time zone: UTC+1 (CET)
  - Summer (DST): UTC+2 (CEST)
- Website: www.laalgaba.es

La Algaba is a Spanish municipality in the province of Seville, Andalusia, with a population of around 16,000. It is part of the region of La Vega and is located 11 km from the province's capital, Seville. The town dates back to the Byzantine Empire and has many historical artifacts and significant churches.

The Guadalquivir river features prominently in the history of La Algaba. The river acquires a considerable width here, and fishing on its banks is a common activity among locals. The town is also known for its many festivals.

== History ==
The earliest mention of a settlement in this area comes from the early Byzantine Empire (sixth century CE), mentioning that the descendants of the earlier Turdetan civilization founded the village of Bálbilis at this location. This village was later destroyed by the Visigoths. The town's current name comes from the Arabic Al-Gaba, which means 'the forest'. Fernando III conquered the area in 1247 and gave it to his son Don Fadrique.

At Fadrique's death, the area reverted to the crown. In 1304 it was given to the infant Don Alfonso de la Cerda, who later ceded it to the Duke of Niebla. The area was next ruled by Don Juan Guzman Medina Sidonia. In the 16th century, CE Philip II of Spain converted the lordship into a marquisate. In the 19th century, a municipal government was established.

== Culture ==
=== Monuments ===
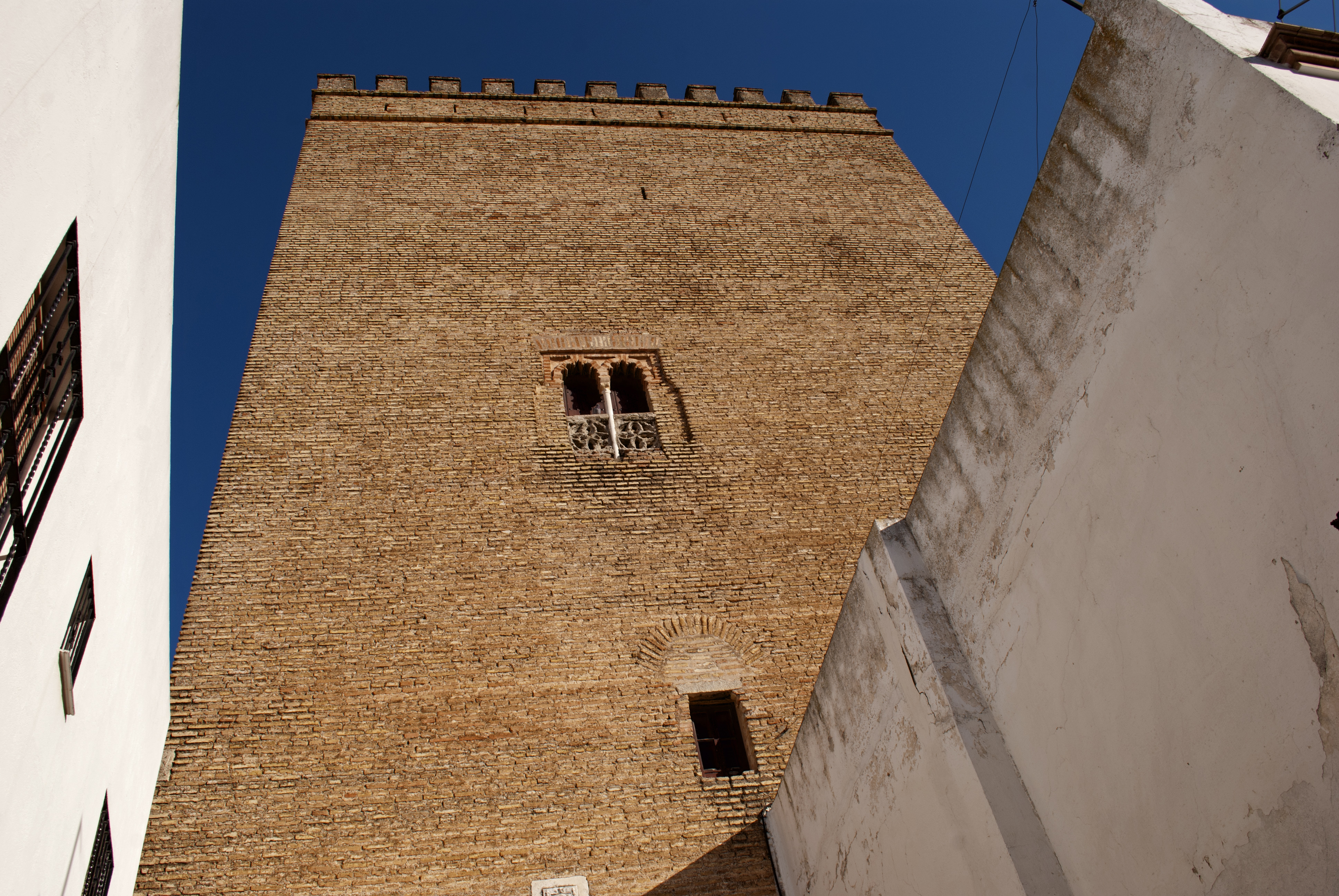
Guzmanes Tower, the Algaba

La Algaba contains three buildings of note.

- The Iglesia de Santa María de las Nieves (Church of Santa Maria de las Nieves), built in the Gothic-Mudéjar style. Destroyed by the 1755 Lisbon earthquake, it was reconstructed by architects Pedro de San Martín, Tomás Zambrano, and Pedro de Silva.
- The Ermita de la Inmaculada Concepción (Chapel of the Immaculate Conception), dating back to at least 1712 CE. It was restored in 1929 and retains sculptures like the Virgen de la Concepción and San Jose.
- The Torre de los Guzmanes (Tower of Guzman), considered "the symbol of La Algaba", completed in 1446 CE. With a height of 27 meters, it was conceived as a defensive and residential structure, but was closed in the 16th century.

The Church of Nuestro Padre Jesus Nazareno, the Ermita de San Salvador, the Bullring, the Old Bridge and Roman necropolis are also found within the town.

=== Natural areas ===
==== Guadalquivir River ====
The river Guadalquivir is central to the history of La Algaba. While passing through this town, the river widens considerably. It is surrounded by orchards of orange and large poplars leaning over the water. Fishing on its banks is a common activity among locals.

==== Rivera de Huelva River ====
The river Rivera de Huelva is located in the western part of the municipality on the road towards Santiponce. The union of water forms it from one hand, the Brook Galapagar and, secondly, water desembalsadas by the El Gergal. Its channel flows into the Guadalquivir once past the main town of La Algaba.

== Festivals ==
- Cabalgata Reyes Magos (Three Kings Parade), celebrated on 5 January.
- Carnaval, celebrated in February.
- Cruces de Mayo, celebrated on 3 May.
- Romería de la Purísima Concepción (Pilgrimage of the Immaculate Conception), celebrated the first Sunday of June.
- Santa Marta, celebrated on 29 July.
- Fiesta de Septiembre y Feria de los Toros (September Festival and Bullfighting Fair), celebrated the third week of September.
- Los Candevelares (Feast of the Immaculate Conception), celebrated on 7 December.

== Twin Cities ==
- Cuba San Antonio de los Baños, Cuba

== Notable people ==
- Diego Tristán, a former footballer who played in the Betis B, Mallorca B, Real Mallorca, Deportivo La Coruña, AS Livorno, West Ham and Cádiz CF. He was a player of the Spanish team and won the Pichichi Trophy with Deportivo La Coruña in 2002.
- Pedro Bazán, footballer in the 1950s played in the Real Jaén, CD Málaga (where he is top scorer), FC Barcelona and Deportivo la Coruña. He was also player of the Spanish Selection.
- Cayetana Fitz-James Stuart (Duchess of Alba), 16th Marchioness of La Algaba.

== See also ==
- List of municipalities in Seville
