= 2012–13 La Liga =

82nd season of La Liga

La Liga
- Season: 2012–13
- Dates: 18 August 2012 – 1 June 2013
- Champions: Barcelona; 22nd title
- Relegated: Mallorca; Deportivo La Coruña; Zaragoza
- Champions League: Barcelona; Real Madrid; Atlético Madrid; Real Sociedad
- Europa League: Valencia; Real Betis; Sevilla
- Matches: 380
- Goals: 1,091 (2.87 per match)
- Top goalscorer: Lionel Messi (46 goals)
- Best goalkeeper: Thibaut Courtois (0.78 goals/match)
- Biggest home win: Atlético Madrid 6–0 Deportivo La Coruña (9 December 2012)
- Biggest away win: Rayo Vallecano 0–5 Barcelona (27 October 2012); Mallorca 0–5 Real Madrid (28 October 2012); Valencia 0–5 Real Madrid (20 January 2013)
- Highest scoring: Deportivo La Coruña 4–5 Barcelona (20 October 2012)
- Longest winning run: 12 matches Barcelona
- Longest unbeaten run: 19 matches Barcelona
- Longest winless run: 15 matches Zaragoza
- Longest losing run: 6 matches Deportivo La Coruña; Mallorca
- Highest attendance: 96,589; Barcelona 2–2 Real Madrid
- Average attendance: 29,430

The 2012–13 La Liga season (known as the Liga BBVA for sponsorship reasons) was the 82nd since its establishment. The campaign began on 18 August 2012, and concluded on 1 June 2013. Barcelona won the league for a 22nd time, after leading the league the entire season and amassing 100 points, equalling Real Madrid's points record from the previous season.

As in previous years, Nike provided the official ball for all matches, with a new Nike Maxim Liga BBVA model to be used throughout the season for all matches.

== Teams ==
A total of 20 teams contested the league, including 17 sides from the 2011–12 season and three promoted from the 2011–12 Segunda División. This included the two top teams from the Segunda División, and the victorious team of the play-offs.

Villarreal CF, Sporting de Gijón and Racing de Santander were relegated to 2012–13 Segunda División the previous season: Villarreal were relegated after twelve years in La Liga, Sporting de Gijón returned to Segunda División after a four-year tenure in La Liga, while Racing de Santander ended ten consecutive seasons in La Liga, the longest period in its history.

The three teams that were relegated were replaced by three 2011–12 Segunda División sides: Deportivo de La Coruña made an immediate return to the top level as Segunda División champion. The second-placing team Celta de Vigo was also promoted to La Liga after a five-year absence. The third promoted team was decided in the promotion play-offs where Real Valladolid returned to La Liga after two seasons in Segunda División.

=== Stadia and locations ===
Location of teams in 2012–13 La Liga

Team	Location of stadium	Stadium	Capacity
Athletic Bilbao	Bilbao	San Mamés	39,750
Atlético Madrid	Madrid	Vicente Calderón	54,851
Barcelona	Barcelona	Camp Nou	99,354
Betis	Seville	Benito Villamarín	52,745
Celta Vigo	Vigo	Balaídos	31,800
Deportivo La Coruña	A Coruña	Riazor	34,600
Espanyol	Barcelona	Cornellà-El Prat	40,500
Getafe	Getafe	Coliseum Alfonso Pérez	17,700
Granada	Granada	Nuevo Los Cármenes	22,524
Levante	Valencia	Ciutat de València	25,534
Málaga	Málaga	La Rosaleda	28,963
Mallorca	Palma	Iberostar Stadium	23,142
Osasuna	Pamplona	El Sadar	19,553
Rayo Vallecano	Madrid	Campo de Vallecas	15,489
Real Madrid	Madrid	Santiago Bernabéu	85,454
Real Sociedad	San Sebastián	Anoeta	32,076
Sevilla	Seville	Ramón Sánchez Pizjuán	45,500
Valencia	Valencia	Mestalla	55,000
Valladolid	Valladolid	José Zorrilla	26,512
Zaragoza	Zaragoza	La Romareda	34,596

=== Personnel and sponsorship ===
Team	Head coach	Captain	Kit manufacturer	Shirt sponsor
Athletic Bilbao	(Argentina) Marcelo Bielsa	(Spain) Carlos Gurpegui	Umbro	Petronor
Atlético Madrid	(Argentina) Diego Simeone	(Spain) Gabi	Nike	Azerbaijan, Huawei^{1} and Kyocera^{2}
Barcelona	(Spain) Tito Vilanova	(Spain) Carles Puyol	Nike	Qatar Foundation, UNICEF^{2} ^{3} and TV3^{6}
Betis	(Spain) Pepe Mel	(Spain) Juanma	Macron	Cirsa and Andalucía^{4}
Celta de Vigo	(Spain) Paco Herrera	(Spain) Borja Oubiña	Li-Ning	Citroën^{4} and Estrella Galicia^{2} ^{4}
Deportivo La Coruña	(Spain) Fernando Vázquez	(Spain) Manuel Pablo	Lotto	Estrella Galicia
Espanyol	(Mexico) Javier Aguirre	(Argentina) Cristian Álvarez	Puma	Cancún
Getafe	(Spain) Luis García Plaza	(Spain) Jaime Gavilán	Joma	Confremar and IG Markets^{4}
Granada	(Spain) Lucas Alcaraz	(Spain) Manuel Lucena	Luanvi	Caja Granada
Levante	(Spain) Juan Ignacio Martínez	(Spain) Sergio Ballesteros	Kelme	Comunitat Valenciana
Málaga	(Chile) Manuel Pellegrini	(Spain) Jesús Gámez	Nike	UNESCO^{5}
Mallorca	(Spain) Gregorio Manzano	(Portugal) José Nunes	Macron	Riviera Maya
Osasuna	(Spain) José Luis Mendilibar	(Spain) Patxi Puñal	Astore	Lacturale and Nevir^{2}
Rayo Vallecano	(Spain) Paco Jémez	(Spain) Piti	Erreà	AE — Adquisiciones Empresariales and Nevir^{2}
Real Madrid	(Portugal) José Mourinho	(Spain) Iker Casillas	Adidas	BWIN
Real Sociedad	(France) Philippe Montanier	(Spain) Xabi Prieto	Nike	Canal+^{6} and Kutxa^{2}
Sevilla	(Spain) Unai Emery	(Spain) Andrés Palop	Umbro	Interwetten
Valencia	(Spain) Ernesto Valverde	(Spain) David Albelda	Joma	JinKO Solar
Valladolid	(Serbia) Miroslav Đukić	(Spain) Javier Baraja	Kappa	El Norte de Castilla^{4}
Zaragoza	(Spain) Manolo Jiménez	(Spain) Javier Paredes	Mercury	Proniño and Canal+^{6}

1. Huawei is the sponsor for select matches.
2. On the back of shirt.
3. Barcelona makes a donation to UNICEF in order to display the charity's logo on the back of the club's kit.
4. On the shorts.
5. Málaga makes a donation to UNESCO in order to display the charity's logo on the club's kit.
6. On the left sleeve.

=== Managerial changes ===
Team	Outgoing manager	Manner of departure	Date of vacancy	Replaced by	Date of appointment	Position in table
Barcelona	(Spain) Pep Guardiola	End of contract	30 June 2012	(Spain) Tito Vilanova	13 June 2012	Pre-Season
Valencia	(Spain) Unai Emery	End of contract	30 June 2012	(Argentina) Mauricio Pellegrino	4 June 2012	Pre-Season
Rayo Vallecano	(Spain) José Ramón Sandoval	End of contract	30 June 2012	(Spain) Paco Jémez	14 June 2012	Pre-Season
Granada	(Spain) Abel Resino	End of contract	30 June 2012	(Spain) Juan Antonio Anquela	18 June 2012	Pre-Season
Espanyol	(Argentina) Mauricio Pochettino	Mutual consent	26 November 2012	(Mexico) Javier Aguirre	28 November 2012	20th
Valencia	(Argentina) Mauricio Pellegrino	Sacked	1 December 2012	(Spain) Voro (caretaker)	1 December 2012	12th
Valencia	(Spain) Voro (caretaker)	End of tenure as caretaker	5 December 2012	(Spain) Ernesto Valverde	3 December 2012	12th
Deportivo La Coruña	(Spain) José Luis Oltra	Sacked	30 December 2012	(Portugal) Domingos Paciência	31 December 2012	20th
Sevilla	(Spain) Míchel	Sacked	14 January 2013	(Spain) Unai Emery	14 January 2013	12th
Granada	(Spain) Juan Antonio Anquela	Sacked	30 January 2013	(Spain) Lucas Alcaraz	30 January 2013	17th
Mallorca	(Spain) Joaquín Caparrós	Sacked	4 February 2013	(Spain) Gregorio Manzano	5 February 2013	19th
Deportivo La Coruña	(Portugal) Domingos Paciência	Mutual consent	11 February 2013	(Spain) Fernando Vázquez	11 February 2013	20th
Celta de Vigo	(Spain) Paco Herrera	Sacked	18 February 2013	(Spain) Abel Resino	18 February 2013	18th

== League table ==
Pos	Team	Pld	W	D	L	GF	GA	GD	Pts	Qualification or relegation
1	Barcelona (C)	38	32	4	2	115	40	+75	100	Qualification for the Champions League group stage
2	Real Madrid	38	26	7	5	103	42	+61	85	Qualification for the Champions League group stage
3	Atlético Madrid	38	23	7	8	65	31	+34	76	Qualification for the Champions League group stage
4	Real Sociedad	38	18	12	8	70	49	+21	66	Qualification for the Champions League play-off round
5	Valencia	38	19	8	11	67	54	+13	65	Qualification for the Europa League group stage (Note: Since the 2012–13 Copa del Rey champions Atlético Madrid and runners-up Real Madrid qualified for the 2013–14 UEFA Champions League, the 5th, 6th and 7th placed teams qualified for the group stage, play-off round, and third qualifying round of the 2013–14 UEFA Europa League respectively.)
6	Málaga	38	16	9	13	53	50	+3	57	(Note: Málaga was excluded from participating in any UEFA club competition in 2013–14 season as a punishment for not complying with UEFA Financial Fair Play Regulations. Málaga appealed against this UEFA ban, but the Court of Arbitration for Sport confirmed the decision of the UEFA Club Financial Control Body.)
7	Real Betis	38	16	8	14	57	56	+1	56	Qualification for the Europa League play-off round
8	Rayo Vallecano	38	16	5	17	50	66	−16	53	(Note: Rayo Vallecano was excluded from participating in any UEFA club competition for the next season after RFEF denied them a "UEFA licence" because they didn't meet the requirements as they were immersed in a creditor contest. They appealed to CAS in June 2013 and on 11 July that decision was confirmed. The team placed behind them, Sevilla, took their spot at the Europa League third qualifying round.)
9	Sevilla	38	14	8	16	58	54	+4	50	Qualification for the Europa League third qualifying round
10	Getafe	38	13	8	17	43	57	−14	47	
11	Levante	38	12	10	16	40	57	−17	46	
12	Athletic Bilbao	38	12	9	17	44	65	−21	45	
13	Espanyol	38	11	11	16	43	52	−9	44	
14	Valladolid	38	11	10	17	49	58	−9	43	
15	Granada	38	11	9	18	37	54	−17	42	
16	Osasuna	38	10	9	19	33	50	−17	39	
17	Celta Vigo	38	10	7	21	37	52	−15	37	
18	Mallorca (R)	38	9	9	20	43	72	−29	36	Relegation to Segunda División
19	Deportivo La Coruña (R)	38	8	11	19	47	70	−23	35	Relegation to Segunda División
20	Zaragoza (R)	38	9	7	22	37	62	−25	34	Relegation to Segunda División

Source: La Liga
Rules for classification: 1st points; 2nd head-to-head points; 3rd head-to-head goal difference; 4th goal difference; 5th number of goals scored; 7th Fair-play points
(C) Champions; (R) Relegated

== Results ==
Home \ Away	ATH	ATM	FCB	BET	CEL	RCD	ESP	GET	GCF	LEV	MCF	MLL	OSA	RVA	RMA	RSO	SFC	VCF	VLD	ZAR
Athletic Bilbao		3–0	2–2	3–5	1–0	1–1	0–4	1–2	1–0	0–1	0–0	2–1	1–0	1–2	0–3	1–3	2–1	1–0	2–0	0–2
Atlético Madrid	4–0		1–2	1–0	1–0	6–0	1–0	2–0	5–0	2–0	2–1	0–0	3–1	4–3	1–2	0–1	4–0	1–1	2–1	2–0
Barcelona	5–1	4–1		4–2	3–1	2–0	4–0	6–1	2–0	1–0	4–1	5–0	5–1	3–1	2–2	5–1	2–1	1–0	2–1	3–1
Betis	1–1	2–4	1–2		1–0	1–1	1–0	0–0	1–2	2–0	3–0	1–2	2–1	1–2	1–0	2–0	3–3	1–0	0–0	4–0
Celta Vigo	1–1	1–3	2–2	0–1		1–1	1–0	2–1	2–1	1–1	0–1	1–1	2–0	0–2	1–2	1–1	2–0	0–1	3–1	2–1
Deportivo La Coruña	1–1	0–0	4–5	2–3	3–1		2–0	1–1	0–3	0–2	1–0	1–0	2–0	0–0	1–2	0–1	0–2	2–3	0–0	3–2
Espanyol	3–3	0–1	0–2	1–0	1–0	2–0		0–2	0–1	3–2	0–0	3–2	0–3	3–2	1–1	2–2	2–2	3–3	0–0	1–2
Getafe	1–0	0–0	1–4	2–4	3–1	3–1	0–2		2–2	0–1	1–0	1–0	1–1	1–2	2–1	2–1	1–1	0–1	2–1	2–0
Granada	1–2	0–1	1–2	1–5	2–1	1–1	0–0	2–0		1–1	1–0	1–2	3–0	2–0	1–0	0–0	1–1	1–2	1–1	1–2
Levante	3–1	1–1	0–4	1–1	0–1	0–4	3–2	0–0	3–1		1–2	4–0	0–2	2–3	1–2	2–1	1–0	1–0	2–1	0–0
Málaga	1–0	0–0	1–3	4–0	1–1	3–1	0–2	2–1	4–0	3–1		1–1	1–0	1–2	3–2	1–2	0–0	4–0	2–1	1–1
Mallorca	0–1	1–1	2–4	1–0	1–0	2–3	2–1	1–3	1–2	1–1	2–3		1–1	1–1	0–5	1–0	2–1	2–0	4–2	1–1
Osasuna	0–1	0–2	1–2	0–0	1–0	2–1	0–2	1–0	1–2	4–0	0–0	1–1		1–0	0–0	0–0	2–1	0–1	0–1	1–0
Rayo Vallecano	2–2	2–1	0–5	3–0	3–2	2–1	2–0	3–1	1–0	3–0	1–3	2–0	2–2		0–2	0–2	0–0	0–4	1–2	0–2
Real Madrid	5–1	2–0	2–1	3–1	2–0	5–1	2–2	4–0	3–0	5–1	6–2	5–2	4–2	2–0		4–3	4–1	1–1	4–3	4–0
Real Sociedad	2–0	0–1	3–2	3–3	2–1	1–1	0–1	1–1	2–2	1–1	4–2	3–0	0–0	4–0	3–3		2–1	4–2	4–1	2–0
Sevilla	2–1	0–1	2–3	5–1	4–1	3–1	3–0	2–1	3–0	0–0	0–2	3–2	1–0	2–1	1–0	1–2		4–3	1–2	4–0
Valencia	3–2	2–0	1–1	3–0	2–1	3–3	2–1	4–2	1–0	2–2	5–1	2–0	4–0	0–1	0–5	2–5	2–0		2–1	2–0
Valladolid	2–2	0–3	1–3	0–1	0–2	1–0	1–1	2–1	1–0	2–0	1–1	3–1	1–3	6–1	2–3	2–2	1–1	1–1		2–0
Zaragoza	1–2	1–3	0–3	1–2	0–1	5–3	0–0	0–1	0–0	0–1	0–1	3–2	3–1	3–0	1–1	1–2	2–1	2–2	0–1	

Source: LFP
Legend: Blue = home team win; Yellow = draw; Red = away team win.

== Awards ==
=== La Liga Awards ===
La Liga's governing body, the Liga Nacional de Fútbol Profesional, honoured the competition's best players and coach with LFP Awards.

Award	Recipient
Best Player	(Argentina) Lionel Messi (Barcelona)
Best Coach	(Argentina) Diego Simeone (Atlético Madrid)
Best Goalkeeper	(Belgium) Thibaut Courtois (Atlético Madrid)
Best Defender	(Spain) Sergio Ramos (Real Madrid)
Best Midfielder(s)	(Spain) Asier Illarramendi (Real Sociedad) (Spain) Andrés Iniesta (Barcelona)
Best Forward	(Argentina) Lionel Messi (Barcelona)
Most valuable player	(Portugal) Cristiano Ronaldo (Real Madrid)

==== Team of the Year ====

Team of the Year
Goalkeeper	(Belgium) Thibaut Courtois (Atlético Madrid)			
Defenders	(Spain) Carlos Martínez (Real Sociedad)	(Spain) Sergio Ramos (Real Madrid)	(Brazil) Miranda (Atlético Madrid)	(Brazil) Filipe Luís (Atlético Madrid)
Midfielders	(Spain) Andrés Iniesta (Barcelona)		(Spain) Isco (Málaga)	(France) Antoine Griezmann (Real Sociedad)
Forwards	(Argentina) Lionel Messi (Barcelona)		(Portugal) Cristiano Ronaldo (Real Madrid)	(Colombia) Radamel Falcao (Atlético Madrid)

=== Top goalscorers ===
The Pichichi Trophy is awarded by newspaper Marca to the player who scores the most goals in a season.

Rank	Player	Club	Goals
1	(Argentina) Lionel Messi	Barcelona	46
2	(Portugal) Cristiano Ronaldo	Real Madrid	34
3	(Colombia) Radamel Falcao	Atlético Madrid	28
4	(Spain) Álvaro Negredo	Sevilla	25
5	(Spain) Roberto Soldado	Valencia	24
6	(Spain) Rubén Castro	Real Betis	18
6	(Spain) Piti	Rayo Vallecano	18
8	(Argentina) Gonzalo Higuaín	Real Madrid	16
9	(Spain) Aritz Aduriz	Athletic Bilbao	14
9	(Portugal) Hélder Postiga	Zaragoza	14
9	(Mexico) Carlos Vela	Real Sociedad	14

=== Top assists ===
Rank	Player	Club	Assists
1	(Spain) Andrés Iniesta	Barcelona	16
1	(Germany) Mesut Özil	Real Madrid	16
3	(Argentina) Lionel Messi	Barcelona	12
4	(France) Karim Benzema	Real Madrid	11
4	(Spain) Cesc Fàbregas	Barcelona	11
6	(Croatia) Ivan Rakitić	Sevilla	10
6	(Portugal) Cristiano Ronaldo	Real Madrid	10
8	(Spain) Ibai Gómez	Athletic Bilbao	9
8	(Spain) Koke	Atlético Madrid	9
8	(Chile) Alexis Sánchez	Barcelona	9
8	(Mexico) Carlos Vela	Real Sociedad	9

=== Zamora Trophy ===
The Ricardo Zamora Trophy is awarded by newspaper Marca to the goalkeeper with the lowest ratio of goals conceded to matches played. A goalkeeper had to play at least 28 matches of 60 or more minutes to be eligible for the trophy.

Rank	Player	Club	Goals against	Matches	Average
1	(Belgium) Thibaut Courtois	Atlético Madrid	29	37	0.78
2	(Spain) Víctor Valdés	Barcelona	33	31	1.06
3	(Argentina) Willy Caballero	Málaga	42	34	1.24
3	(Spain) Andrés Fernández	Osasuna	46	37	1.24
5	(Chile) Claudio Bravo	Real Sociedad	40	31	1.29

Source: Marca

=== Fair Play award ===
This award was given annually since 1999 to the team with the best fair play during the season. This ranking takes into account aspects such as cards, suspension of matches, audience behaviour and other penalties. This section not only aims to determine the best fair play, but also serves to break the tie in teams that are tied in all the other rules: points, head-to-head, goal difference and goals scored.

Rank	Club	Matches	Yellow card	Double Yellow Card/Ejection	Direct Red Card	Games of Suspension (Player, only when +3)	Games of Suspension (Club's Personnel)	Audience Behaviour		Total Points
1	Barcelona	38	56	2	0	4^{26}	2^{2}	–	–	74
2	Valladolid	38	77	3	0	–	1^{5}	–	–	88
3	Real Sociedad	38	93	2	0	–	1^{8}	–	–	102
4	Real Madrid	38	90	4	1	4^{2}	–	–	–	105
5	Atlético Madrid	38	98	4	0	–	–	–	–	106
6	Málaga	38	92	2	2	–	1^{9}	–	–	107
7	Granada	38	104	4	1	–	–	–	–	115
8	Mallorca	38	91	5	3	–	2^{7, 35}	–	–	120
9	Deportivo La Coruña	38	93	6	2	–	2^{4, 30}	–	–	121
10	Celta Vigo	38	94	3	0	4^{28}	2^{5, 21}	2 Mild^{3, 9}	–	124
11	Levante	38	108	5	2	–	2^{7, 27}	–	–	134
12	Athletic Bilbao	38	114	6	3	–	–	–	–	135
13	Sevilla	38	98	6	6	–	1^{6}	1 Mild^{6}	–	138
14	Real Betis	38	112	4	3	–	1^{7}	2 Mild^{3, 17}	–	144
15	Getafe	38	109	3	5	4^{31}	3^{6, 15, 19}	–	–	149
16	Osasuna	38	109	3	5	4^{2}	3^{16, 21, 37}	1 Mild^{10}	–	154
16	Valencia	38	124	4	4	–	2^{10}	–	–	154
18	Rayo Vallecano	38	131	2	2	–	2^{9, 23}	1 Mild^{11}	–	156
19	Zaragoza	38	124	6	4	–	3^{8, 9, 25}	–	–	163
20	Espanyol	38	139	8	4	4^{12}	3^{4, 20}	–	–	186

Source: 2012–13 Fair Play Rankings Season

Sources of cards and penalties: Referee's reports, Competition Committee's Sanctions, Appeal Committee Resolutions and RFEF section about Fair Play

Legend:

Icon	Term	Points of sanction	Description
	Yellow Card	1 point/yellow card	
	Double Yellow Card/Ejection	2 points/double yellow card	
	Direct Red Card	3 points/red card	
	Games of Suspension (Player)	As many as banned games	When a player is banned for play more than 3 future games. This punishment overrides the possible red card which caused this sanction
	Games of Suspension (Club's Personnel)	5 points/banned game	When some person of the club (not player) is banned for x future games. This punishment overrides the possible red card which caused this sanction
	Audience Behaviour	Mild (5 points); Serious (6 points); Very Serious (7 points)	When the audience makes some altercations such as explosions, flares, throwing objects to the ground, racist chanting, etc.
	Closure of Stadium	10 points/match with closured stadium	When serious incidents happen which are punished by the closure of the stadium
It also accounts cards to non-players
The number in superscript is the corresponding round to the sanction
Important note: This table is not a count of cards and sanctions resulting from the matches, this table takes into account the removal or application of some cards and sanctions by the competent bodies (Competition Committee, Appeal Committee and Spanish Sports Disciplinary Committee)

== Season statistics ==
=== Scoring ===
- First goal of the season: (Cameroon) Fabrice Olinga for Málaga against Celta Vigo (18 August 2012)
- Last goal of the season: (Spain) Piti for Rayo Vallecano against Athletic Bilbao (1 June 2013)

=== Hat-tricks ===
Player	For	Against	Result	Date
(Colombia) Radamel Falcao	Atlético Madrid	Athletic Bilbao	4–0 (H)	27 August 2012
(Portugal) Cristiano Ronaldo	Real Madrid	Deportivo La Coruña	5–1 (H)	30 September 2012
(Argentina) Lionel Messi	Barcelona	Deportivo La Coruña	5–4 (A)	20 October 2012
(Colombia) Radamel Falcao^{5}	Atlético Madrid	Deportivo La Coruña	6–0 (H)	9 December 2012
(Spain) Xabi Prieto	Real Sociedad	Real Madrid	3–4 (A)	6 January 2013
(Portugal) Cristiano Ronaldo	Real Madrid	Getafe	4–0 (H)	27 January 2013
(Argentina) Lionel Messi^{4}	Barcelona	Osasuna	5–1 (H)	27 January 2013
(Portugal) Cristiano Ronaldo	Real Madrid	Sevilla	4–1 (H)	9 February 2013
(Spain) Álvaro Negredo	Sevilla	Celta Vigo	4–1 (H)	4 March 2013
(Spain) Cesc Fàbregas	Barcelona	Mallorca	5–0 (H)	6 April 2013
(Spain) Álvaro Negredo^{4}	Sevilla	Valencia	4–3 (H)	1 June 2013

- ^{4} Player scored 4 goals
- ^{5} Player scored 5 goals

=== Clean sheets ===
- Most clean sheets: 20
  - Atlético Madrid
- Fewest clean sheets: 5
  - Mallorca

=== Discipline ===
- Most yellow cards (club): 139
  - Espanyol
- Fewest yellow cards (club): 56
  - Barcelona
- Most yellow cards (player): 19
  - Cristian Săpunaru (Zaragoza)
- Most red cards (club): 12
  - Sevilla
- Fewest red cards (club): 2
  - Barcelona
  - Real Sociedad
- Most red cards (player): 4
  - Alejandro Arribas (Osasuna)

=== Overall ===
- Most wins - Barcelona (32)
- Fewest wins - Deportivo La Coruña (8)
- Most draws - Real Sociedad (12)
- Fewest draws - Barcelona (4)
- Most losses - Zaragoza (22)
- Fewest losses - Barcelona (2)
- Most goals scored - Barcelona (115)
- Fewest goals scored - Osasuna (33)
- Most goals conceded - Mallorca (72)
- Fewest goals conceded - Atlético Madrid (31)

== Attendances ==
FC Barcelona drew the highest average home attendance in the 2012-13 edition of La Liga.

#	Football club	Home games	Average attendance
1	FC Barcelona	19	71,120
2	Real Madrid	19	69,988
3	Atlético de Madrid	19	44,296
4	Valencia CF	19	36,919
5	Athletic Club	19	36,105
6	Real Betis	19	34,983
7	Deportivo de La Coruña	19	29,517
8	Sevilla FC	19	28,026
9	Málaga CF	19	27,109
10	Real Sociedad	19	23,367
11	Real Zaragoza	19	22,632
12	RCD Espanyol	19	20,978
13	Celta de Vigo	19	19,944
14	Granada CF	19	19,669
15	Osasuna	19	16,337
16	Real Valladolid	19	16,311
17	Levante UD	19	14,792
18	RCD Mallorca	19	14,449
19	Rayo Vallecano	19	9,650
20	Getafe CF	19	8,553

== See also ==
- List of Spanish football transfers summer 2012
- List of Spanish football transfers winter 2012–13
- 2012–13 Segunda División
- 2012–13 Copa del Rey
