= José Díaz Macías =

Spanish footballer

Personal information
- Full name: José Díaz Macías
- Date of birth: 20 November 1946
- Place of birth: Madrid, Spain
- Date of death: 8 December 2006 (aged 60)
- Place of death: Málaga, Spain
- Height: 1.75 m (5 ft 9 in)
- Position: Defender

Youth career
- Real Madrid

Senior career*
Years	Team	Apps	(Gls)
1968–1970	Plus Ultra		
1970–1981	Málaga	283	(4)
1981–1985	Antequerano	113	(1)
Total		396+	(5+)

International career
1971–1972	Spain U23	3	(0)
1973	Spain	2	(0)
- * Club domestic league appearances and goals

José Díaz Macías (20 November 1946 – 8 December 2006) was a Spanish footballer who played as a defender.

He spent most of his career with Málaga, playing 329 games over ten seasons in all competitions, including 178 in La Liga. He played two games for Spain in 1973.

== Club career ==
Born in Madrid, Macías was a youth player at Real Madrid, who loaned him to their farm team, Plus Ultra. He represented the club in the Tercera División and had trials with Real Madrid and Atlético Madrid before signing for Málaga on a two-year contract in 1970. He made his debut in La Liga on 30 November in 3–0 loss at Sporting de Gijón as a late substitute for Joaquín Irles. He scored five goals for the club, starting on 29 October 1973 with a late winner in a 2–1 home victory over Castellón.

On 27 April 1980, with Málaga already relegated by the 31st matchday, the team lost 3–0 at home to relegation-threatened Salamanca having taken 4.4 million Spanish pesetas in bribes. Macías was one of five Málaga players suspended over the fix, being banned from football for a year. In July 1981, with his suspension over, he signed for newly promoted Segunda División B club Antequerano.

== International career ==
Macías played three games for the Spain under-23 team in qualification for the 1972 Olympic event. His debut on 24 November 1971 was an 8–3 loss away to Bulgaria, as a half-time substitute for Juan Verdugo.

Macías was the last of three players from the original CD Málaga to be capped by Spain, after Migueli and Juan Antonio Deusto, all in the space of just over a year. His debut on 17 January 1973 was a 3–2 win away to Greece in 1974 FIFA World Cup qualification, followed on 2 May with a friendly loss by the same score away to the Netherlands. Mundo Deportivo criticised the defensive performance of Macías and Javier Irureta against the Dutch pair of Arie Haan and Johnny Rep.

== Death ==
Macías died in Málaga on 8 December 2006, aged 60. He was buried at the San Gabriel Cemetery.
