= Juan Antonio Deusto =

Spanish footballer

Personal information
- Full name: Juan Antonio Deusto Olagorta
- Date of birth: 8 January 1946
- Place of birth: Portugalete, Spain
- Date of death: 21 July 2011 (aged 65)
- Place of death: Bilbao, Spain
- Height: 1.80 m (5 ft 11 in)
- Position: Goalkeeper

Senior career*
Years	Team	Apps	(Gls)
1965–1970	Atlético Bilbao	11	(0)
1970–1975	Málaga	143	(0)
1975–1980	Hércules	69	(0)
Total		223	(0)

International career
1973	Spain	1	(0)
- * Club domestic league appearances and goals

Juan Antonio Deusto Olagorta (8 January 1946 – 21 July 2011) was a Spanish footballer who played as a goalkeeper.

He played 223 La Liga games over 15 seasons, for Atlético Bilbao, Málaga and Hércules, and won the Zamora Trophy for best goalkeeper of 1971–72. He appeared in one game for Spain in 1973.

After retiring, Deusto went through financial and personal issues. He was homeless and untraceable for a period, contributing to his death at age 65.

== Club career ==
=== Atlético Bilbao ===
Born in Portugalete in the Basque Country, Deusto made his professional debut for Atlético Bilbao in La Liga on 19 September 1965. He came on as a substitute for the last nine minutes of a 1–0 home win over Valencia due to Javier Etxebarria Azarloza's injury, as his only game of the season.

Deusto was back-up to Spain national team goalkeeper José Ángel Iribar and played only 13 games for Bilbao, with his second coming on 31 December 1967 in an 8–0 win over Real Betis at the San Mamés Stadium. In late 1968, Iribar's injury gave him a run of five league and two Inter-Cities Fairs Cup matches, while the season ended with him on the bench as his team won the Copa del Generalísimo with a 1–0 win over Elche.

=== Málaga ===
In July 1970, Deusto moved to newly promoted Málaga. In 1971–72, he won the Ricardo Zamora Trophy for the lowest goals conceded average; while Valencia had a better defence by one goal over the season, they did so with multiple goalkeepers. Deusto is the only Málaga player to win this honour in the top flight, while José Antonio Gallardo and Munir Mohamedi did so in the Segunda División.

=== Hércules ===
After completing his second five-year spell at a club, Deusto moved in June 1975 to Hércules. Weeks later, he was linked with Barcelona who were reported to double his transfer fee to 17 million Spanish pesetas. Barcelona player Johan Cruyff, known for his forthright views, personally requested for the Hércules administration to sell Deusto, as they already had Argentina international Miguel Ángel Santoro as back-up.

Deusto settled in Alicante with his wife, son and daughter, and the family were respected in the city. Hércules president José Rico Pérez put him in charge of the club's bingo operation, which was a popular way for teams to make extra income at the time.

== International career ==
Due to the presence of Iribar in the national team's goal, Deusto earned only one cap for Spain, and also had to compete with Manolo Reina to be second choice. On 24 November 1973, he played a 2–1 friendly loss to West Germany in Stuttgart. He was the second of three players from the original CD Málaga to represent the country, all in separate matches in the space of just over a year, between Migueli and José Díaz Macías.

== Later life and death ==
After retiring from football, Deusto returned to Bilbao, where he lost his fortune on the ownership of a bar, and was divorced. Though his sister and the Athletic Bilbao veterans' association wished to locate and support him, he disappeared from their radar. When Hércules went to play away to Las Palmas, manager Benito Joanet recognised him as a homeless man on the streets of the Canarian city, and invited him to eat with them.

Deusto returned to Bilbao and was supported by his sister, but avoided contact with anyone else, and had poor health due living on the street. He died on 21 July 2011, aged 65, at the Hospital de Basurto in the city.
