= José Antonio González (footballer) =

Spanish footballer (born 1995)

Personal information
- Full name: José Antonio González Estrada
- Date of birth: 20 October 1995 (age 31)
- Place of birth: Puente Genil, Spain
- Height: 1.83 m (6 ft 0 in)
- Position: Midfielder

Youth career
- Alcolea
- 2013–2014: Córdoba

Senior career*
| Years | Team | Apps | (Gls) |
| 2013–2017 | Córdoba B | 117 | (12) |
| 2015 | → Martos (loan) | 13 | (3) |
| 2017–2018 | Granada B | 33 | (4) |
| 2018–2020 | Granada | 5 | (0) |
| 2019–2020 | → Córdoba (loan) | 20 | (0) |
| 2020–2021 | Recreativo | 20 | (1) |
| 2021–2024 | Melilla | 92 | (7) |
| 2024–2025 | Linense | 17 | (0) |
| 2025 | Puente Genil | 9 | (1) |
- * Club domestic league appearances and goals as of 11 May 2025

José Antonio González Estrada (born 20 October 1995) is a Spanish footballer who plays as a midfielder.

== Club career ==
Born in Puente Genil, Córdoba, Andalusia, González joined Córdoba CF's youth setup in 2013, from UD Alcolea Los Ángeles. He made his senior debut with the reserves on 12 May 2013, playing the last three minutes in a 1–0 Tercera División home win against CD Alcalá.

On 29 January 2015, after featuring sparingly, González was loaned to Martos CD in the fourth division, until June. Upon returning, he became a regular starter and achieved promotion to Segunda División B in 2016.

On 10 July 2017, González moved to another reserve team, Córdoba CF B in the third tier. On 15 August of the following year, he signed a new two-year contract and was promoted to the main squad in Segunda División.

González made his professional debut on 18 August 2018, coming on as a late substitute for Fede Vico in a 0–0 away draw against Elche CF. The following 16 July, after achieving promotion to La Liga, he renewed his contract until 2021 and was immediately loaned to Córdoba CF for one year. On 23 July 2020 he left Granada.

On 1 August 2020 he signed for Recreativo de Huelva.
