= CD Málaga =

Spanish football club

Málaga
- Full name: Club Deportivo Málaga
- Nicknames: Malaguistas; Boquerones; Albiazules; Albicelestes; Blanquiazules
- Founded: 1904 (as Málaga Football Club)
- Dissolved: 1992
- Ground: La Rosaleda (before rebuilding), Málaga, Andalusia, Spain
- Capacity: 28,963
Home colours

Club Deportivo Málaga was a Spanish football club based in Málaga, in the autonomous community of Andalusia. It played twenty seasons in La Liga, before being dissolved in 1992.

== History ==
=== Origins ===
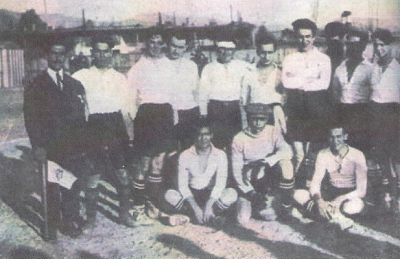
Málaga FC 1922

The first football club in Málaga was established in 1904, with the formation of the Málaga Foot-Ball Club. It was nothing more than a society intended to promote football, a new sport in the city, carried from the United Kingdom. Its first rivals were small teams formed by crews of foreign ships arriving in the local harbor. In 1907, further attempts of popularizing football were performed by Málaga FC.

1912 saw the arrival of a rival club, FC Malagueño, and the establishment of a great rivalry with Málaga FC, which had merged with other minor clubs like Málaga Racing. In 1927, Málaga FC became the Real Málaga FC after they were granted royal patronage by Alfonso XIII.

During the 1929–30 season both Real Málaga FC and FC Malagueño clubs became founding members of the Tercera División. In late 1930, Real Málaga FC, were reformed as the Málaga Sport Club.

=== Club merging in 1933 ===
In 1933 Málaga SC and FC Malagueño merged to become Club Deportivo Malacitano, although it was not a real merging at all, only a name change of FC Malagueño, which had economic wealth and a better squad than Málaga SC. Thanks to this operation, the CD Malacitano was able to use Malagueño's squad, having their contracts canceled in the other way.

In 1934 this new club made its debut in the Segunda División when the division was expanded from ten teams to 24, and remained there until the outbreak of the Spanish Civil War in 1936. In 1940, Malacitano participated in the inaugural edition of the FEF President Cup, which they won after beating AD Ferroviaria 5–2 in the last matchday, courtesy of a first-half brace from Juan Mesa and a second-half hat-trick from Tavilo, thus claiming the club's first-ever piece of silverware.

In 1941 the club changed their name to the Club Deportivo Málaga when the new La Rosaleda stadium was inaugurated.

=== First promotion to La Liga in 1949, first topflight years ===
In 1946, Málaga undertook a change of fortune with the election of Manuel Navarro Nogueroles as the club's new president. His first big success as Málaga's president was the signing of forward Pedro Bazán, who had previously scored nine goals in a single Second Division match against the Hércules CF on 4 January 1949; he went on to become the club's all-time top scorer with 146 official goals. After two unsuccessful seasons, Navarro hired a new coach, Luis Urquiri, who had just achieved promotion to La Liga with Deportivo de La Coruña.

During the first half of the season, Málaga averaged three goals per game, but despite this, the president decided to look for two other forwards, including Manolo Jimeno, who was introduced in a friendly match against UD Melilla. Málaga finished the 1948–49 season as the team with the fewest goals conceded and only six losses on its way to promotion, which was achieved on the last matchday with a 5–1 away victory over Racing de Ferrol to finish level on points with both Real Sociedad and Granada, but ahead of the latter on head-to-head goal difference. Therefore, on 17 April 1949, Navarro Nogueroles became the first Málaga president to be promoted to the First Division of Spanish football, doing so within eight years into Málaga's existence. This promotion brought joy to the Malaga fans at the end of the 1940s, a period in which the city was still very impoverished, with many people suffering from poverty and lack of means, so the celebrations were therefore apotheotic.

At the start of the following season, Navarro Nogueroles fired Urquiri with the false allegation of his financial demands, only so he could replace him with the legendary Ricardo Zamora, who stayed at the helm of the team until its first relegation at the end of the 1950–51 season, lacking just one point to maintain status.

In the subsequent seasons, Málaga achieved two new promotions to La Liga in 1951–52 and 1953–54, being relegated after just one year in both. The 1952–53 season was notable because of a resounding 6–0 thrashing of the Real Madrid at La Rosaleda, the major result up to date for Málaga against that club.

=== The golden years in the early 1970s ===
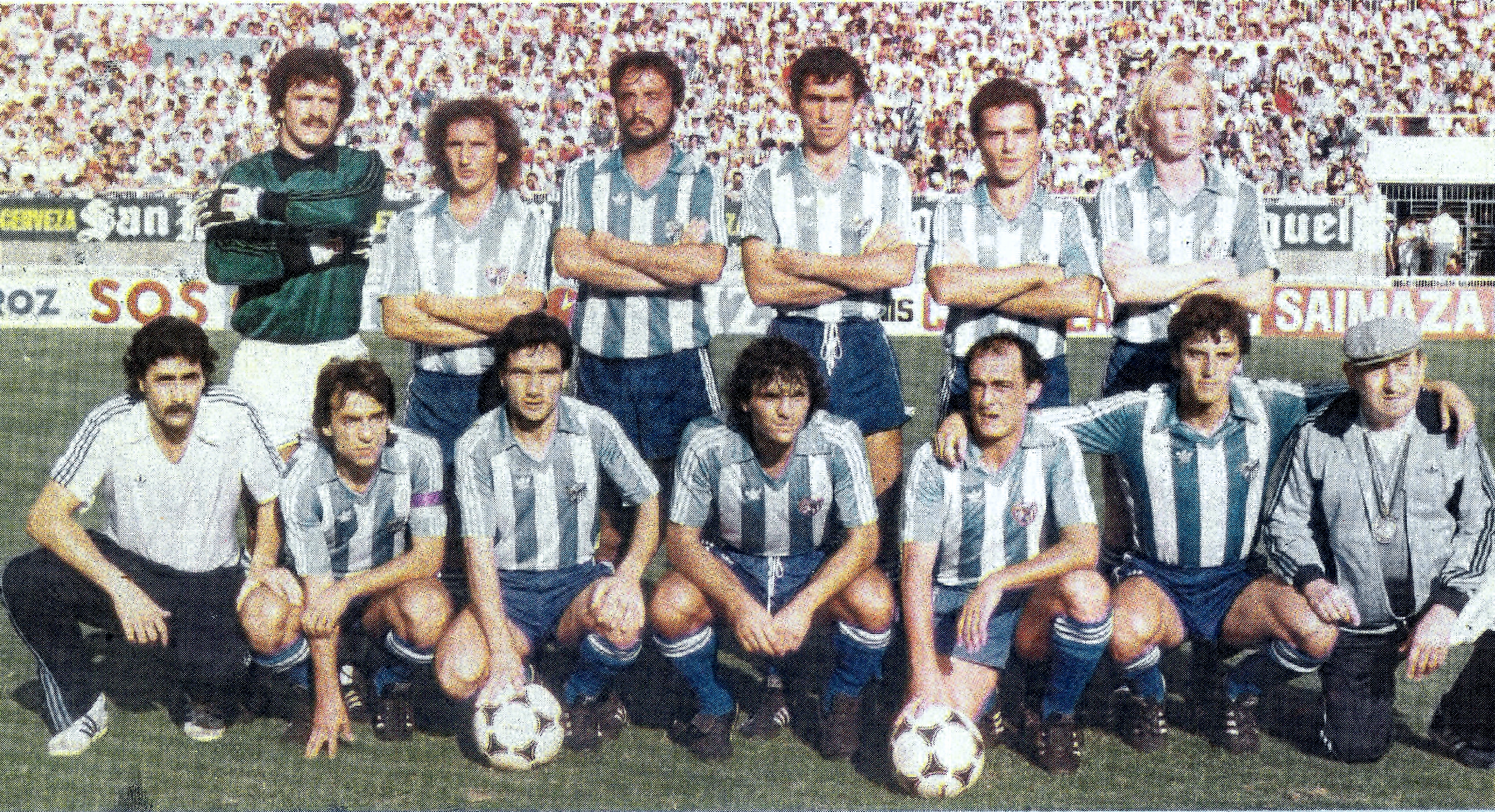
CD Málaga 1983

After several new fleeting first-level promotions in the 1960s, which turned out in immediate relegations, Málaga were promoted once again in 1969–70 under the command of chairman Antonio Rodríguez López and coach Jenő Kálmár, to start a five-year top flight stay. However, president in charge Antonio Rodríguez López was brutally murdered by the Mafia in the year 1971, and was replaced by Rafael Serrano Carvajal for the next season.

With notable players like Migueli, Sebastian Viberti, Juan Antonio Deusto and José Díaz Macías, the club achieved two seventh-place finishes in the league in 1971–72 and 1973–74 (best results of the club up to date), a Ricardo Zamora Trophy in 1971–72 season performed by goalkeeper Deusto, and a 1972–73 run of the club in the Spanish Cup, where they were dumped out in the semifinals by Athletic Bilbao. They also notably scored a victory at Camp Nou for the first time after winning against FC Barcelona at the end of the 1971–72 season. The club also established in 1973 an official anthem, Málaga La Bombonera, and from that moment the song is still the official anthem of the club.

After a polemic exit by Viberti at the end of 1973–74 season, the so-called golden years ended with a new relegation to the second level in 1974–75.

=== Dissolution ===
In 1992, CD Málaga dissolved after financial difficulties.

== Season to season ==
- As Fútbol Club Malagueño

Season	Tier	Division	Place	Copa del Rey
1929–30	3	3ª	2nd	
1930–31	3	3ª	2nd	
1931–32	3	3ª	3rd	
1932–33	3	3ª	1st	

- As Club Deportivo Malacitano

Season	Tier	Division	Place	Copa del Rey
1933–34	3	3ª	3rd	
1934–35	2	2ª	5th	5th Round
1935–36	2	2ª	5th	3rd Round
1939–40	2	2ª	3rd	1st Round
1940–41	2	2ª	5th	3rd Round

- 1940 FEF President Cup

Pos	Team	Pld	W	D	L	GF	GA	GD	Pts	Qualification or relegation
1	Club Deportivo Malacitano	8	5	2	1	27	13	+14	12	Champion
2	CA Osasuna	8	5	1	2	18	12	+6	11	
3	CD Sabadell	8	2	2	4	18	21	−3	6	
4	AD Ferroviaria	8	3	0	5	16	21	−5	6	
5	Recreativo de Granada	8	2	1	5	11	23	−12	5	

Source: bdfutbol
Rules for classification: 1) points; 2) head-to-head points; 3) head-to-head goal difference; 4) goal difference; 5) number of goals scored; 6) fair-play points; 7) playoff match
- As Club Deportivo Málaga

Season	Tier	Division	Place	Copa del Rey
1941–42	2	2ª	4th	Round of 32
1942–43	2	2ª	5th	Round of 32
1943–44	3	3ª	1st	
1944–45	3	3ª	2nd	
1945–46	3	3ª	1st	
1946–47	2	2ª	9th	Round of 16
1947–48	2	2ª	4th	6th Round
1948–49	2	2ª	2nd	5th Round
1949–50	1	1ª	12th	Round of 16
1950–51	1	1ª	13th	
1951–52	2	2ª	1st	Quarterfinals
1952–53	1	1ª	15th	
1953–54	2	2ª	3rd	
1954–55	1	1ª	16th	
1955–56	2	2ª	11th	
1956–57	2	2ª	5th	
1957–58	2	2ª	14th	
1958–59	2	2ª	15th	1st Round
1959–60	3	3ª	1st	
1960–61	2	2ª	12th	1st Round

Season	Tier	Division	Place	Copa del Rey
1961–62	2	2ª	2nd	Round of 16
1962–63	1	1ª	16th	Quarterfinals
1963–64	2	2ª	9th	Round of 32
1964–65	2	2ª	2nd	1st Round
1965–66	1	1ª	13th	Round of 16
1966–67	2	2ª	1st	Round of 32
1967–68	1	1ª	10th	Round of 16
1968–69	1	1ª	14th	Quarterfinals
1969–70	2	2ª	2nd	Round of 32
1970–71	1	1ª	9th	Quarterfinals
1971–72	1	1ª	7th	5th Round
1972–73	1	1ª	10th	Semifinals
1973–74	1	1ª	7th	5th Round
1974–75	1	1ª	16th	Round of 16
1975–76	2	2ª	3rd	Round of 16
1976–77	1	1ª	18th	3rd Round
1977–78	2	2ª	13th	3rd Round
1978–79	2	2ª	2nd	4th Round
1979–80	1	1ª	18th	4th Round
1980–81	2	2ª	6th	2nd Round

Season	Tier	Division	Place	Copa del Rey
1981–82	2	2ª	3rd	Round of 16
1982–83	1	1ª	10th	4th Round
1983–84	1	1ª	9th	4th Round
1984–85	1	1ª	16th	3rd Round
1985–86	2	2ª	11th	4th Round
1986–87	2	2ª	6th	3rd Round
1987–88	2	2ª	1st	4th Round
1988–89	1	1ª	16th	Round of 32
1989–90	1	1ª	17th	Round of 16
1990–91	2	2ª	4th	5th Round
1991–92	2	2ª	18th	5th Round

- 20 seasons in La Liga
- 31 seasons in Segunda División
- 9 seasons in Tercera División

== Honours ==
=== Domestic ===
- Segunda División
  - Champions (3): 1951–52, 1966–67, 1987–88
- Tercera División
  - Champions (3): 1943–44, 1945–46, 1959–60

=== Friendly ===
- Trofeo Costa del Sol
  - Winners (3): 1963, 1971, 1974

== Trofeo Costa del Sol ==
Between 1961 and 1983, Málaga organised its own summer tournament, the Trofeo Costa del Sol. The hosts won it on three occasions, successively defeating Real Madrid, Red Star Belgrade and Derby County. In 2003, the competition was revived by Club Deportivo's successor, Málaga CF.

In 1976, CD Málaga won a similar summer trophy, the Trofeo Ciudad de La Línea, played in La Línea de la Concepción, near Gibraltar. The triumph arrived after penalty shootout defeats of FC Dinamo Tbilisi and Valencia CF, after 0–0 draws.

== Selected former players ==
- (Argentina) Sebastián Viberti
- (Cameroon) Cyril Makanaky
- (Colombia) Albeiro Usuriaga
- (Colombia) Miguel Guerrero
- (Croatia) Luka Bonačić
- (Denmark) Kim Christofte
- (Denmark) John Lauridsen
- (Morocco) Abdallah Ben Barek
- (Paraguay) Antonio Cabral
- (Paraguay) Sebastián Fleitas
- (Spain) Pedro Bazán
- (Spain) Juan Antonio Deusto
- (Spain) Jesús Garay
- (Spain) Pedro Luis Jaro
- (Spain) Juanito
- (Spain) Antonio Mata
- (Spain) Paquito
- (Spain) Miguel Ramos Vargas
- (Spain) Esteban Vigo
- (Uruguay) Gustavo Matosas
- (Finland) Pertti Jantunen

== Famous coaches ==
- (Argentina) (France) Helenio Herrera
- (Brazil) Otto Bumbel
- (Hungary) Jenő Kálmár
- (Hungary) (Spain) Ladislao Kubala
- (Spain) Domènec Balmanya
- (Spain) Antonio Benítez
- (Spain) Marcel Domingo
- (Spain) Ricardo Zamora
- (Spain) José María Zárraga
- (Socialist Federal Republic of Yugoslavia) Milorad Pavić
