= Migueli (footballer, born 1942) =

Spanish footballer

Personal information
- Full name: Miguel Ramos Vargas
- Date of birth: 12 December 1942
- Place of birth: Málaga, Spain
- Date of death: 27 November 2002 (aged 59)
- Place of death: Málaga, Spain
- Height: 1.67 m (5 ft 6 in)
- Position: Midfielder

Senior career*
Years	Team	Apps	(Gls)
1961–1966	Atlético Malagueño		
- → Alhaurino (loan)
1966–1967	→ Cádiz (loan)	21	(5)
1967–1980	Málaga	405	(37)
Total		426+	(42+)

International career
1972–1973	Spain	2	(0)
- * Club domestic league appearances and goals

Miguel Ramos Vargas (12 December 1942 – 27 November 2002), known as Migueli, was a Spanish footballer who played as a midfielder.

He spent most of his career at CD Málaga, making 464 total appearances and scoring 46 goals over the course of 13 seasons. He totalled 271 games and 19 goals in La Liga, and 155 games and 23 goals in the Segunda División, where he made his debut on loan at Cádiz.

Migueli was the first Málaga player to represent Spain, being capped in 1972 and 1973.

== Club career ==
Born in Málaga in Andalusia, Migueli came through the ranks of his hometown club, CD Málaga. Having played for the reserve team Atlético Malagueño and for CD Alhaurino, he was loaned to Cádiz in 1966 while undertaking military service. He made his Segunda División debut on 2 October 1966, scoring the opening goal for Cádiz in a 1–1 home draw with Recreativo de Huelva. Including cup games, he made 27 appearances and scored five goals.

Ahead of the 1967–68 season in La Liga, Migueli signed his first professional contract aged nearly 25, with an annual salary of 100,000 Spanish pesetas. He made his debut on 10 September in the first game of the season, a 1–1 draw at Las Palmas.

During his 13 years on the first team at La Rosaleda Stadium, Migueli experienced four relegations and three promotions to the top flight. The last of his 464 appearances was a 2–0 home loss to Hércules on 11 May 1980 as the season ended with descent. His 271 top-flight appearances for Málaga were a record until Duda beat it in May 2015.

On 27 April 1980, with Málaga already relegated by the 31st matchday, the team lost 3–0 at home to relegation-threatened Salamanca having taken 4.4 million pesetas in bribes. Migueli was one of five Málaga players suspended for involvement in the fix, receiving a one-year ban from football.

Migueli remained involved at his club, serving as assistant to manager Antonio Benítez, his long-term teammate. He was also a scout for the club.

== International career ==
Migueli was the first player to be capped by Spain while at Málaga. Two of his teammates were the only other players from the original CD Málaga to play for the national team; José Díaz Macías and Juan Antonio Deusto played one match each in 1973.

Migueli made his debut on 16 February 1972 in a 1–1 draw away to Northern Ireland in UEFA Euro 1972 qualification, as a 55th-minute substitute for Enrique Lora. The game was played at Boothferry Park in Kingston upon Hull, England, due to The Troubles.

One year and five days after his debut, Migueli played his only other game for Spain, coming off the bench in a 3–1 win over Greece in a 1974 FIFA World Cup qualifier, at his club's ground.

== Death ==
Migueli died of cancer in Málaga on 27 November 2002, aged 59. Five hundred people attended his funeral at the San Gabriel Cemetery, and he was cremated. Málaga CF, successor of his main club, wore black armbands and observed a minute's silence before their UEFA Cup game against Leeds United.

In February 2013, gate number 8 at La Rosaleda was named in honour of Migueli. He had worn that number as a player.
