= Marcos Lavín =

Spanish footballer

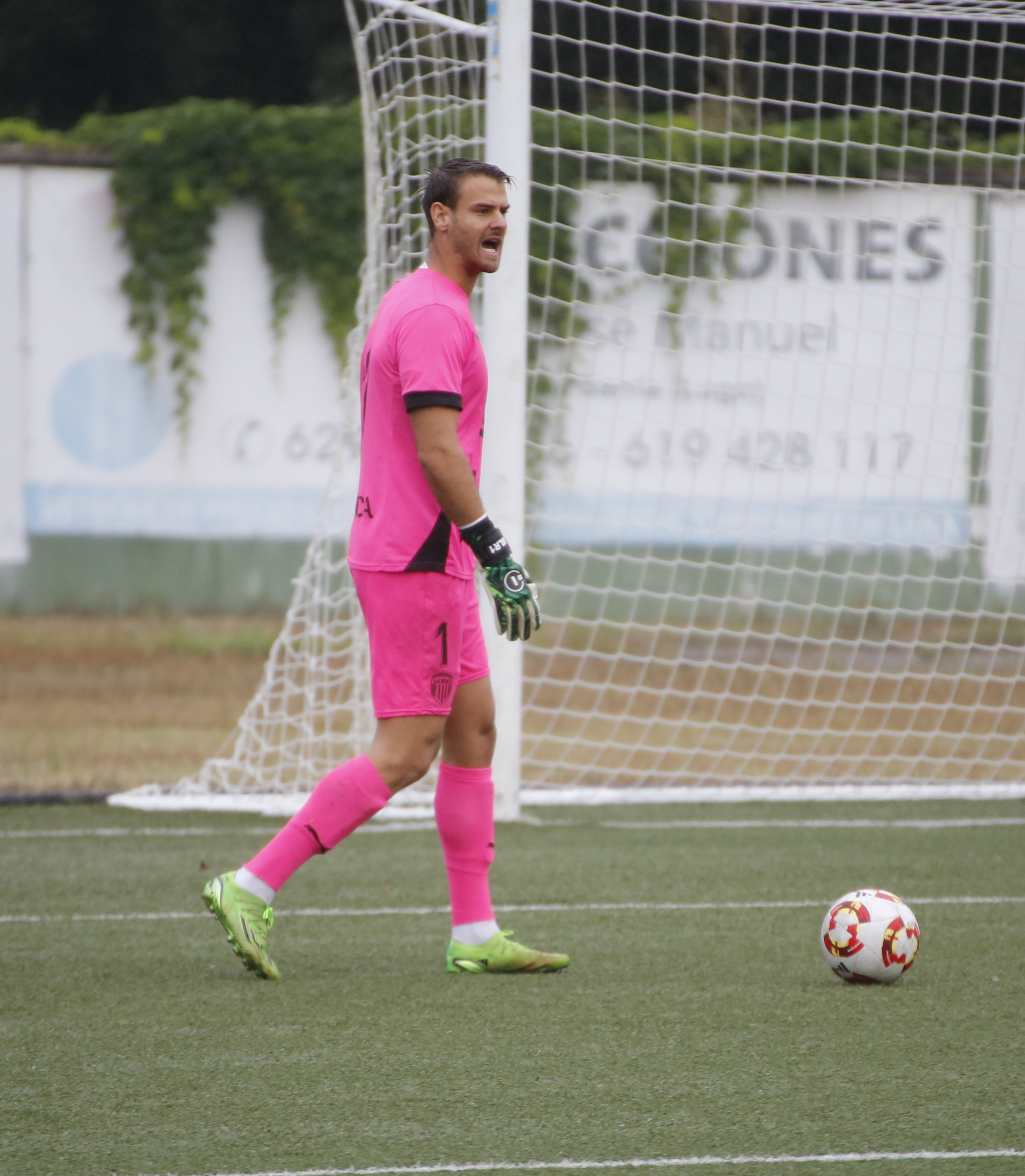

Personal information
- Full name: Marcos Lavín Rodríguez
- Date of birth: 2 September 1996 (age 30)
- Place of birth: Madrid, Spain
- Height: 1.87 m (6 ft 2 in)
- Position: Goalkeeper

Team information
- Current team: Académico de Viseu

Youth career
- 2007–2012: Estepona
- 2012: Vázquez Cultural
- 2012–2016: Real Madrid

Senior career*
Years	Team	Apps	(Gls)
2016	Logroñés B	5	(0)
2016–2017	Atlético Saguntino	2	(0)
2017–2018	Córdoba B	29	(0)
2018–2019	Córdoba	10	(0)
2019–2020	Getafe B	22	(0)
2020–2022	Voluntari	6	(0)
2022–2023	Atlético Saguntino	30	(0)
2023–2024	Algeciras	12	(0)
2024–2025	Lugo	30	(0)
2025–2026	USL Dunkerque	9	(0)
2026–	Académico de Viseu	0	(0)
- * Club domestic league appearances and goals as of 11 May 2026

Marcos Lavín Rodríguez (born 2 September 1996) is a Spanish footballer who plays as a goalkeeper for Primeira Liga club Académico de Viseu.

== Club career ==
Lavín was born in Madrid, and finished his formation with the academy of Real Madrid. On 1 February 2016, he joined Logroñes after terminating his contract with Los Blancos, but only appeared with the reserves during his spell.

On 12 July 2016, Lavín signed for Atlético Saguntino in Segunda División B. A backup to Adrián Lluna, he moved to Córdoba on 23 June of the following year, being initially assigned to the B-side also in the third division.

Lavín was promoted to the first-team ahead of the 2018–19 campaign, as a backup to Carlos Abad, and renewed his contract until 2021 on 3 October 2018. He made his professional debut thirteen days later, starting in a 4–1 away routing of Elche for the season's Copa del Rey.

Lavín made his Segunda División debut on 3 November 2018, playing the full 90 minutes in a 4–2 home win against Extremadura. The following 1 August, after suffering relegation, he cut ties with the club, and signed for Getafe CF's reserves shortly after.

On 3 September 2020, Lavín moved abroad for the first time in his career, joining Romanian Liga I side Voluntari. He departed the club in January to sign for Extremadura in Primera División RFEF, but left only weeks later after being unable to play in the country until June.

On 21 July 2022, Laviín returned to Atlético Saguntino, now in Segunda Federación. Regularly used, he signed for third division side Algeciras CF on 11 July of the following year, but spent most of the campaign as a backup to Lucho García.

On 6 July 2024, Lavín signed a one-season contract with fellow division three side Lugo. On 6 August of the following year, he moved to USL Dunkerque of the French Ligue 2 on a one-year deal with an option to extend.

On 8 July 2026, Lavín joined Académico de Viseu in the Portuguese Primeira Liga.

== Career statistics ==
=== Club ===
As of 5 August 2026

Appearances and goals by club, season and competition
Club	Season	League			Cup		Europe		Other		Total	
Club	Season	Division	Apps	Goals	Apps	Goals	Apps	Goals	Apps	Goals	Apps	Goals
Logroñés B	2015–16	Regional Preferente	5	0	—		—		—		5	0
Saguntino	2016–17	Segunda División B	2	0	1	0	—		—		3	0
Córdoba B	2017–18	Segunda División B	29	0	—		—		—		29	0
Córdoba	2018–19	Segunda División	10	0	3	0	—		—		13	0
Getafe B	2019–20	Segunda División B	22	0	—		—		—		22	0
Voluntari	2020–21	Liga I	7	0	0	0	—		0	0	7	0
Voluntari	2021–22	Liga I	0	0	0	0	—		—		0	0
Voluntari	Total		7	0	0	0	—		0	0	7	0
Atlético Saguntino	2022–23	Segunda Federación	30	0	2	0	—		—		32	0
Algeciras	2023–24	Primera Federación	12	0	—		—		—		12	0
Lugo	2024–25	Primera Federación	30	0	—		—		0	0	30	0
Dunkerque	2025–26	Ligue 2	9	0	3	0	—		—		12	0
Académico de Viseu	2026–27	Primeira Liga	0	0	0	0	—		—		0	0
Career total			156	0	9	0	0	0	0	0	165	0
