= Igor Paim =

Brazilian footballer (born 1997)

Personal information
- Full name: Igor Paim Sganderla
- Date of birth: 5 November 1997 (age 29)
- Place of birth: São Lourenço do Oeste, Brazil
- Height: 1.70 m (5 ft 7 in)
- Position: Midfielder

Team information
- Current team: Gama

Youth career
- –2018: Figueirense

Senior career*
| Years | Team | Apps | (Gls) |
| 2018 | Rampla Juniors | 15 | (3) |
| 2018–2019 | FC Cartagena | 12 | (0) |
| 2020 | Operário | 2 | (0) |
| 2020 | Serra Macaense | 10 | (0) |
| 2021– | Gama | 15 | (0) |
- * Club domestic league appearances and goals as of 18:35, 14 July 2021 (UTC)

Igor Paim Sganderla (born 5 November 1997) is a Brazilian footballer who plays as a midfielder for Gama.
