= Ángel Montoro (footballer) =

Spanish footballer

Personal information
- Full name: Ángel Montoro Sánchez
- Date of birth: 25 June 1988 (age 38)
- Place of birth: Valencia, Spain
- Height: 1.81 m (5 ft 11 in)
- Position: Midfielder

Youth career
- Valencia

Senior career*
| Years | Team | Apps | (Gls) |
| 2006–2012 | Valencia B | 57 | (8) |
| 2007–2012 | Valencia | 4 | (0) |
| 2008–2009 | → Murcia (loan) | 29 | (3) |
| 2009–2010 | → Real Unión (loan) | 14 | (0) |
| 2012–2015 | Recreativo | 91 | (10) |
| 2015–2016 | Almería | 14 | (0) |
| 2016–2017 | Las Palmas | 26 | (0) |
| 2017–2022 | Granada | 125 | (11) |
| 2022–2023 | Oviedo | 28 | (1) |
| 2023–2024 | Murcia | 6 | (0) |
| Total | | 394 | (33) |

International career
| 2004 | Spain U16 | 3 | (0) |
| 2005 | Spain U17 | 3 | (0) |
| 2007 | Spain U19 | 6 | (0) |
- * Club domestic league appearances and goals

Ángel Montoro Sánchez (born 25 June 1988) is a Spanish former professional footballer who played as a central midfielder.

== Club career ==
A product of hometown Valencia CF's youth system, Montoro was born in Valencia. He made his first-team debut on 31 October 2007, playing ten minutes in a 1–5 La Liga home loss against Real Madrid as interim manager Óscar Fernández filled in for the recently dismissed Quique Sánchez Flores; with Ronald Koeman's subsequent arrival and the January 2008 signing of Hedwiges Maduro and Éver Banega, he had to return to the reserves.

In the following two years, Montoro served as many loans (both in the Segunda División), with Real Murcia CF and newly promoted Real Unión. Released by Valencia in summer 2012, he continued competing at that level with Recreativo de Huelva.

Montoro signed for UD Almería also of the second division on 30 June 2015. On 26 January 2016, he terminated his contract and joined top-flight club UD Las Palmas for 18 months.

On 15 July 2017, free agent Montoro agreed to a three-year deal with Granada CF. In the 2018–19 season, he scored five goals to help his side return to the top division as runners-up.

Montoro contributed 11 appearances in the 2020–21 UEFA Europa League, in a quarter-final run for the Andalusians. His sole goal came in the round of 32 against Italy's SSC Napoli, who won 2–1 at the Stadio Diego Armando Maradona but lost 3–2 on aggregate.

Montoro tested positive for COVID-19 in July 2021. He left Granada the following June after their relegation, and signed a one-year contract with second-tier Real Oviedo.

In August 2023, the 35-year-old Montoro returned to Murcia, now in the Primera Federación. He retired midway through the campaign after being waived, and settled in Granada.

== Career statistics ==
As of match played 1 May 2022

Appearances and goals by club, season and competition
| Club | Season | League | | | National Cup | | Continental | | Total | |
| Club | Season | Division | Apps | Goals | Apps | Goals | Apps | Goals | Apps | Goals |
|---|---|---|---|---|---|---|---|---|---|---|
| Valencia | 2007–08 | La Liga | 4 | 0 | 2 | 0 | 0 | 0 | 6 | 0 |
| Valencia | 2010–11 | La Liga | 0 | 0 | 0 | 0 | — | | 0 | 0 |
| Valencia | Total | | 4 | 0 | 2 | 0 | 0 | 0 | 6 | 0 |
| Murcia (loan) | 2008–09 | Segunda División | 29 | 3 | 2 | 0 | — | | 31 | 3 |
| Real Unión (loan) | 2009–10 | Segunda División | 14 | 0 | 1 | 0 | — | | 15 | 0 |
| Recreativo | 2012–13 | Segunda División | 22 | 0 | 1 | 0 | — | | 23 | 0 |
| Recreativo | 2013–14 | Segunda División | 39 | 6 | 1 | 0 | — | | 40 | 6 |
| Recreativo | 2014–15 | Segunda División | 30 | 4 | 1 | 0 | — | | 31 | 4 |
| Recreativo | Total | | 91 | 10 | 3 | 0 | 0 | 0 | 94 | 10 |
| Almería | 2015–16 | Segunda División | 14 | 0 | 2 | 0 | — | | 16 | 0 |
| Las Palmas | 2015–16 | La Liga | 9 | 0 | 1 | 0 | — | | 10 | 0 |
| Las Palmas | 2016–17 | La Liga | 17 | 0 | 3 | 0 | — | | 20 | 0 |
| Las Palmas | Total | | 26 | 0 | 4 | 0 | 0 | 0 | 30 | 0 |
| Granada | 2017–18 | Segunda División | 29 | 2 | 0 | 0 | — | | 29 | 2 |
| Granada | 2018–19 | Segunda División | 35 | 5 | 0 | 0 | — | | 35 | 5 |
| Granada | 2019–20 | La Liga | 15 | 2 | 0 | 0 | — | | 15 | 2 |
| Granada | 2020–21 | La Liga | 22 | 1 | 3 | 0 | 11 (Note: Appearances in UEFA Europa League) | 1 | 36 | 2 |
| Granada | 2021–22 | La Liga | 24 | 1 | 1 | 0 | — | | 25 | 1 |
| Granada | Total | | 125 | 11 | 4 | 0 | 11 | 1 | 140 | 12 |
| Career total | | | 303 | 24 | 18 | 0 | 11 | 1 | 332 | 25 |

== Honours ==
Valencia

- Copa del Rey: 2007–08

Spain U19

- UEFA European Under-19 Championship: 2007
