= Pedro Bazán =

Spanish footballer (1922–1992)

Personal information
- Full name: Pedro Bazán Romero
- Date of birth: 26 March 1922
- Place of birth: La Algaba, Spain
- Date of death: 26 May 1992 (aged 70)
- Place of death: Málaga, Spain
- Height: 1.68 m (5 ft 6 in)
- Position: Forward

Youth career
- Sevilla

Senior career*
Years	Team	Apps	(Gls)
- Sparta Sevilla
- CD Algabeño
1943–1944	Hércules de Cadiz		
1944–1946	Olímpica Jiennense		
1946–1954	Málaga	188	(134)
1954–1957	Deportivo La Coruña	50	(30)

International career
1949	Spain B	1	(1)

Managerial career
- 1962–1964: CD Veleño
- 1967–1968: Fuengirola
- 1971–1972: CD Veleño
- 1972–1973: CD Veleño
- * Club domestic league appearances and goals

Pedro Bazán Romero (26 March 1922 – 26 May 1992) was a Spanish footballer who played as a forward.

== Club career ==
Born into a family of bullfighters, in La Algaba on 26 March 1922, Bazán began his football career at Sevilla. Bazán picked up a meniscus injury whilst at Sevilla, halting his progress with the club. Bazán moved onto Sparta Sevilla, CD Algabeño, Hércules de Cadiz and Olímpica Jiennense, before signing for Málaga in December 1946.

On 5 January 1947, Bazán scored his first goal for Málaga, in his second game, scoring the winner in a 2–1 away win against Alcoyano. The 1947–48 Segunda División season proved to be prolific for Bazán. On 5 October 1947, Bazán scored five goals against Badalona in an 8–3 victory. On 4 January 1948, Bazán scored a triple hat-trick against Hércules in a 9–2 win. Bazán finished the 1947–48 season with 29 goals in 26 Segunda División appearances. The following season, Bazán finished the campaign as top scorer, scoring five hat-tricks, as Málaga gained promotion to the Primera División. On 15 March 1953, Bazán scored an 11-minute hat-trick against Real Madrid.

In 1954, Bazán signed for Deportivo La Coruña. Bazán scored one hat-trick for Deportivo, in a 4–0 win against Real Sociedad on 14 October 1956.

== International career ==
Bazán made a single appearance for Spain B, scoring in a 5–2 victory against Portugal B on 20 March 1949. Bazán also missed a penalty in the game, however the referee ordered a retake due to a fault by Portugal's goalkeeper Manuel Capela. Silvestre Igoa took, and scored, the subsequent penalty.

=== International goals ===
Scores and results list Spain B's goal tally first.

#	Date	Venue	Opponent	Score	Result	Competition
1	20 March 1949	Estadio Riazor, A Coruña, Spain	Portugal B	4–1	5–2	Friendly

== Managerial career ==
Following his retirement, Bazán managed CD Veleño and Fuengirola.
