= Kako Sanz =

Spanish footballer

Personal information
- Full name: Alejandro Sanz Sainz
- Date of birth: 5 June 1993 (age 33)
- Place of birth: Tudela, Spain
- Height: 1.81 m (5 ft 11 in)
- Position: Midfielder

Youth career
- Real Sociedad

Senior career*
Years	Team	Apps	(Gls)
2012–2018	Real Sociedad B	169	(6)
2018–2020	Numancia	32	(0)
2020	→ Castellón (loan)	7	(0)
2020–2021	Atlético Baleares	6	(0)
2021	Inter Turku	22	(1)
2022	Linares	10	(0)
2022–2023	Osasuna B	22	(0)
2024	Barakaldo	7	(1)
- * Club domestic league appearances and goals as of 5 May 2024

Alejandro "Kako" Sanz Sainz (born 5 June 1993) is a Spanish footballer who plays as a central midfielder.

== Club career ==
Sanz was born in Tudela, Navarre, and represented Real Sociedad as a youth. In July 2012 he was promoted to the reserves in Segunda División B, and made his senior debut on 26 August of that year by coming on as a second-half substitute in a 0–0 away draw against Racing de Santander B.

Sanz scored his first senior goal on 9 February 2013, netting the winner in a 2–1 home defeat of CD Izarra. He subsequently became a regular starter for Sanse, being a team captain in the process.

On 16 July 2018, free agent Sanz signed a one-year deal with Segunda División side CD Numancia. He made his professional debut on 18 August, replacing Pape Maly Diamanka late into a 3–3 away draw against Córdoba CF.

On 10 June 2019, Sanz extended his contract with the Soria outfit until 2022. The following 18 January, he was loaned to CD Castellón in the third division for six months, and helped the latter side achieve promotion to the second division.

On 24 September 2020, Sanz signed for CD Atlético Baleares in division three. The following 27 January, he moved abroad and signed for FC Inter Turku in Finland.
