= Juancho (footballer) =

Colombian footballer (born 1996)

Personal information
- Full name: Juan David Victoria López
- Date of birth: 24 January 1996 (age 30)
- Place of birth: Palmira, Colombia
- Height: 1.78 m (5 ft 10 in)
- Position: Forward

Team information
- Current team: Numancia
- Number: 10

Youth career
- Leganés
- 2012–2015: Rayo Vallecano

Senior career*
Years	Team	Apps	(Gls)
2015–2017	Rayo Vallecano B	69	(12)
2017–2019	Granada B	47	(4)
2018–2019	Granada	5	(0)
2020	Las Rozas	8	(1)
2020–2021	Peña Deportiva	8	(0)
2021	Salamanca	10	(2)
2021	Amora	1	(0)
2022	Salamanca	16	(6)
2022–2023	El Ejido	33	(3)
2023–2024	Sanse	33	(13)
2024–2025	Salamanca	31	(4)
2025–	Numancia	30	(7)
- * Club domestic league appearances and goals as of 7 May 2026

Juan David Victoria López (born 24 January 1996), commonly known as Juancho, is a Colombian footballer who plays as a forward for Spanish Segunda Federación club Numancia.

== Club career ==
Born in Palmira, Valle del Cauca, Juancho joined Rayo Vallecano's youth setup in 2012, from CD Leganés. He made his senior debut with the reserves on 22 March 2015, coming on as a second-half substitute in a 2–1 Segunda División B home win against Real Madrid Castilla.

Juancho scored his first senior goal on 20 September 2015, netting the opener in a 2–1 home win against RSD Alcalá in the Tercera División. He was regularly used during the following two seasons, scoring eight goals in 2016–17.

In July 2017, Juancho moved to another reserve team, Club Recreativo Granada of the third division. He made his professional debut with the main squad on 26 August 2018, replacing Alberto in a 1–1 Segunda División home draw against CD Lugo. On 2 September 2019, Juancho terminated his contract with the Andalusians.

On 17 January 2020, Juancho moved to Las Rozas CF on a free transfer.
