= Sebastián Viberti =

Argentine footballer and trainer

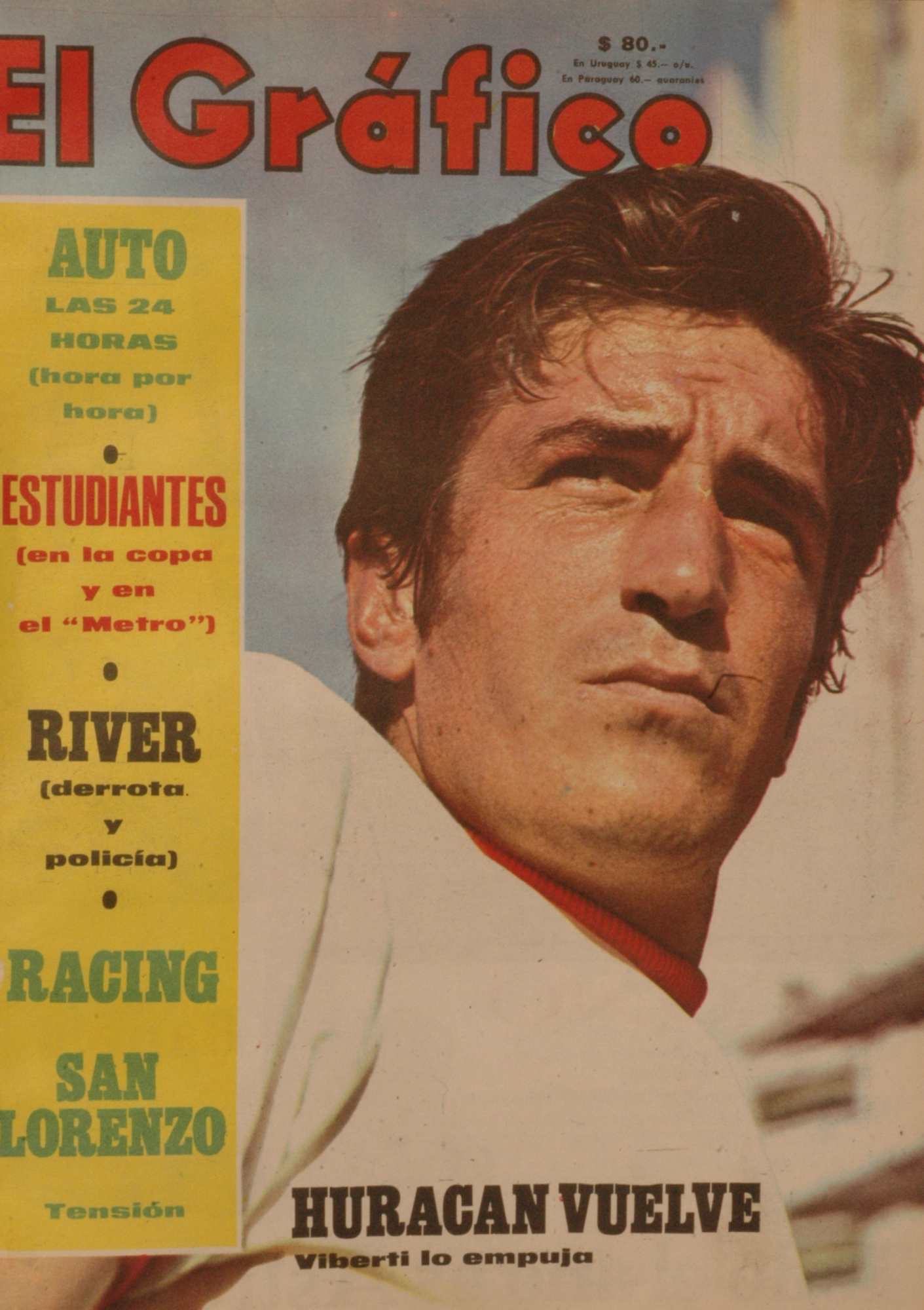
Sebastián Viberti

Sebastián Humberto Viberti Irazoki, nicknamed "El Pelado" (25 May 1944, in Córdoba – 24 November 2012, in Córdoba) was an Argentine footballer and trainer. Known as a former Málaga CF player. He was a father of 3 children, one the football coach Martín Viberti.
