= Huévar del Aljarafe =

Huévar del Aljarafe, Spain
- city
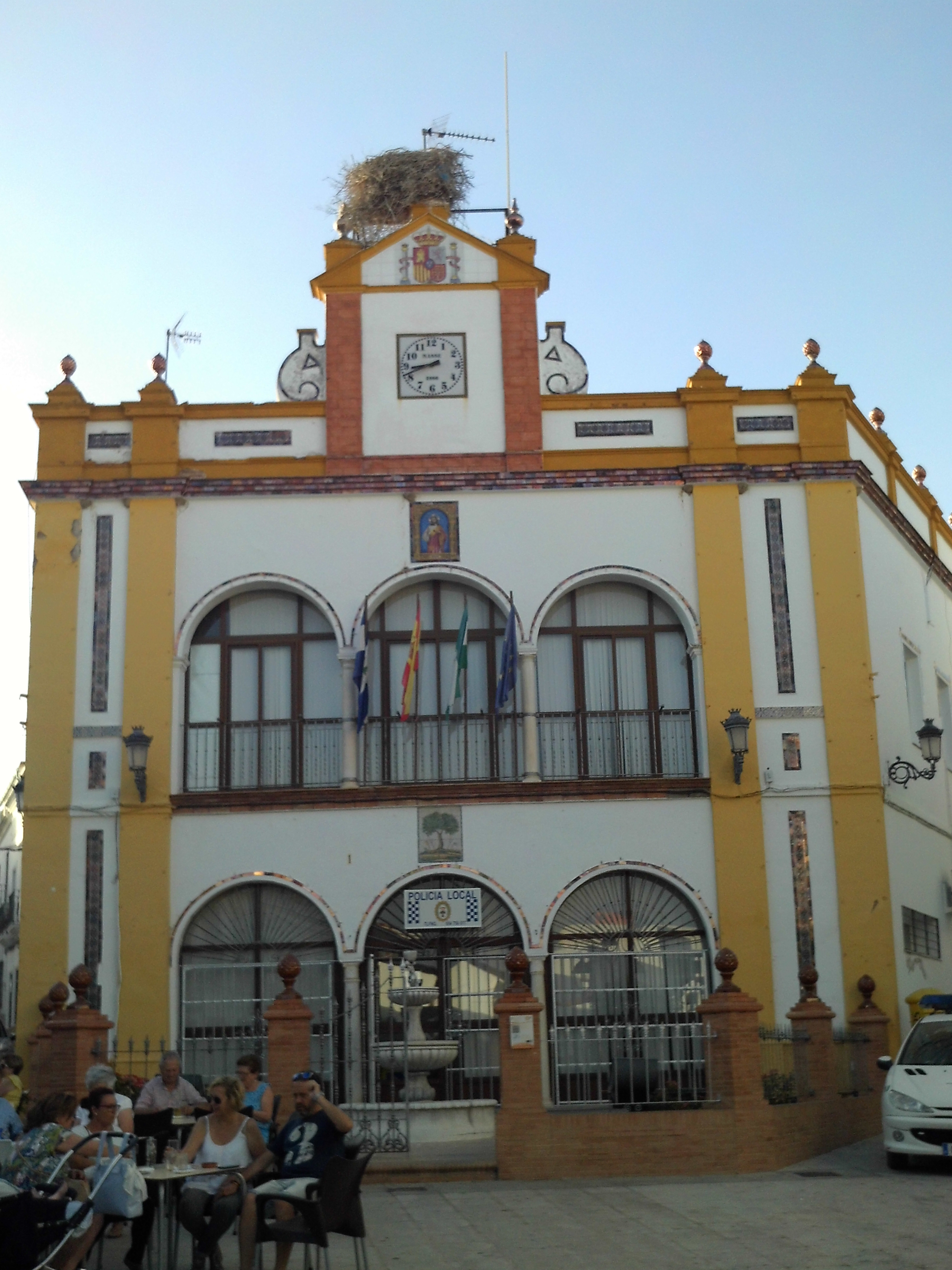
- Town hall of Huévar del Aljarafe

- Flag Coat of arms
- Interactive map of Huévar del Aljarafe, Spain
- Coordinates: 37°21′N 6°16′W
- Country: Spain
- Province: Seville
- Municipality: Huévar del Aljarafe

Area
  - Total: 58 km^{2} (22 sq mi)
- Elevation: 75 m (246 ft)

Population (2025-01-01)
  - Total: 3,388
  - Density: 58/km^{2} (150/sq mi)
- Time zone: UTC+1 (CET)
  - Summer (DST): UTC+2 (CEST)

Huévar del Aljarafe is a city located in the province of Seville, Spain. According to the 2005 census (INE), the city has a population of 2457 inhabitants.

== See also ==
- List of municipalities in Seville
