= Fede Vico =

Spanish footballer (born 1994)

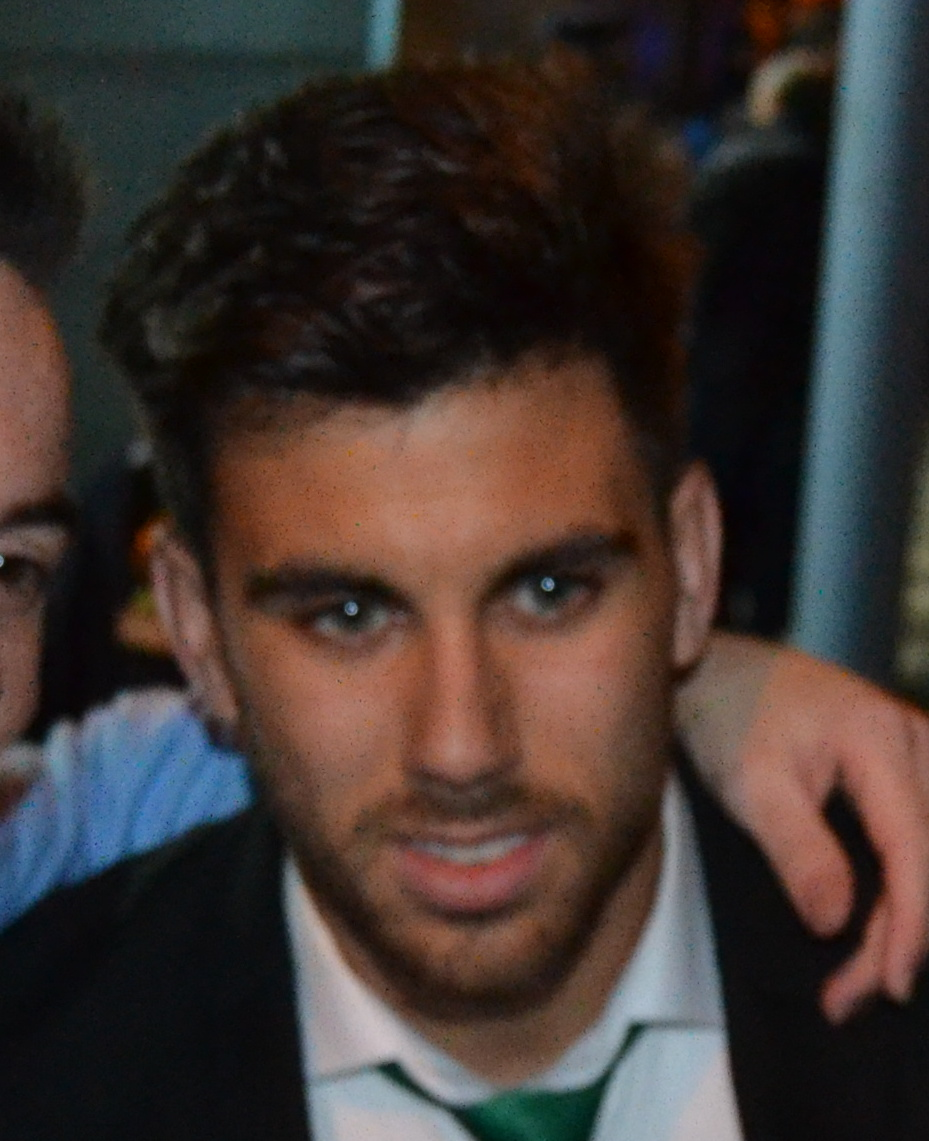
- Vico in 2015

Personal information
- Full name: Federico Vico Villegas
- Date of birth: 4 July 1994 (age 32)
- Place of birth: Córdoba, Spain
- Height: 1.76 m (5 ft 9 in)
- Position: Winger

Team information
- Current team: Hércules
- Number: 16

Youth career
- Córdoba

Senior career*
Years	Team	Apps	(Gls)
2011–2013	Córdoba B	15	(2)
2011–2013	Córdoba	60	(8)
2013–2016	Anderlecht	0	(0)
2014	→ Oostende (loan)	10	(1)
2014–2015	→ Córdoba (loan)	20	(0)
2016	→ Albacete (loan)	13	(1)
2016–2018	Lugo	58	(4)
2018–2019	Leganés	0	(0)
2018–2019	→ Granada (loan)	39	(5)
2019–2021	Granada	38	(2)
2021–2023	Leganés	56	(3)
2023	Asteras Tripolis	1	(0)
2024	Alcorcón	16	(1)
2025	Eldense	15	(1)
2025–2026	Ibiza	15	(1)
2026	Pontevedra	0	(0)
2026–	Hércules	8	(1)

International career
2010–2011	Spain U17	6	(2)
2012	Spain U18	2	(0)
2013	Spain U19	8	(3)
2012–2013	Spain U20	6	(0)
- * Club domestic league appearances and goals as of 10 June 2026

Federico 'Fede' Vico Villegas (born 4 July 1994) is a Spanish professional footballer who plays as a left winger for Primera Federación club Hércules.

== Club career ==
Vico was born in Córdoba, Andalusia. Midway through the 2010–11 season, the 16-year-old started training with hometown Córdoba CF's first team, but he made his senior debut with the reserves. He made his first appearance with the main squad on 23 January 2011, coming on as a substitute for Juanmi Callejón in a 1–1 home draw against Girona FC, for his only match of the Segunda División campaign.

On 3 March 2012, Vico scored in a 2–1 league win at neighbours Xerez CD, and became the youngest Córdoba player to score a goal for the club. Late in the following month, this time as a starter, he netted his second, at home against CD Guadalajara (3–2 victory).

On 13 June 2013, R.S.C. Anderlecht agreed a €1.6 million transfer fee with Córdoba, the highest ever received by the Spaniards, and Vico signed a five-contract with the Belgian side. On 31 January of the following year, he was loaned to fellow Pro League team K.V. Oostende, and scored on his debut in the competition on 15 February to help his team to a 1–1 draw at KV Mechelen.

On 1 September 2014, Vico returned to his former club Córdoba in a season-long loan deal. He made his debut in the competition on the 21st, playing the last 15 minutes of the 1–3 home loss to Sevilla FC; additionally, he was converted into a left-back by manager Miroslav Đukić.

Vico scored a backheel own goal in a 1–2 home defeat against Getafe CF on 9 March 2015. His team were eventually relegated as last.

On 1 February 2016, having made no additional appearances for Anderlecht, Vico was loaned to Albacete Balompié in his country's second division. On 8 December, the free agent signed with CD Lugo of the same league until June 2018.

Vico joined CD Leganés on 5 July 2018, on a two-year contract. Four days later, he was loaned to second-tier side Granada CF for one year.

On 11 June 2019, after achieving promotion, Granada activated Vico's buyout clause and he signed a permanent two-year deal with the club. On 15 August 2021, he returned to Leganés by agreeing to a two-year contract.

On 1 September 2023, Vico joined Super League Greece side Asteras Tripolis FC. The following 15 January, with just one league appearance to his credit, he moved back to Spain on a short-term deal at AD Alcorcón in division two.

Vico agreed to a five-month contract at second-tier CD Eldense in January 2025. On 9 July, he joined UD Ibiza of Primera Federación, being released in January 2026 and resuming his career in that league with Pontevedra CF and Hércules CF; just three days after his arrival, the former issued a press release announcing he would not join because of undisclosed "circumstances beyond the club's control", wishing him "all the best during this difficult time."
