= 2016–17 UD Almería season =

UD Almería
2016–17 season
- President: Alfonso García
- Head coach: Luis Miguel Ramis
- Stadium: Juegos Mediterráneos
- Segunda División: 15th
- Copa del Rey: Second round
- Top goalscorer: League: Quique (16); All: Quique (16)
Home colours	Away colours

The 2016–17 season was UD Almería's twentieth seventh season of existence and the second consecutive in Segunda División.

== Squad ==
As of 28 June 2017

No.	Name	Pos.	Nat.	Place of birth	Date of birth (age)	Club caps	Club goals	Int. caps	Int. goals	Signed from	Date signed	Fee	Contract End
Goalkeepers
1	Julián Cuesta	GK	(Spain) (Andalusia)	Campotéjar	28 March 1991 (aged 26)	31	0	–	–	Sevilla	6 June 2014	Undisc.	30 June 2017
13	Casto	GK	(Spain) (Extremadura)	P. del Guadiana	12 June 1982 (aged 34)	77	0	–	–	Las Palmas	2 July 2015	Free	30 June 2017
42	Albert Batalla	GK	(Spain) (Catalonia)	Balaguer	4 June 1998 (aged 19)	–	–	–	–	Almería B	6 September 2016	Free	30 June 2018
Defenders
2	Isidoro	RB	(Spain) (Andalusia)	Pedrera	1 August 1986 (aged 30)	10	0	–	–	Elche	30 August 2016	Free	30 June 2017
3	Fran Vélez	CB/LB/DM	(Spain) (Catalonia)	Tarragona	13 June 1991 (aged 25)	78	2	–	–	Almería B	13 January 2014	Free	30 June 2018
4	Ximo Navarro	RB/CB	(Spain) (Andalusia)	Guadahortuna	23 January 1990 (aged 27)	93	3	–	–	Mallorca	12 June 2014	Free	30 June 2017
7	Marco Motta	RB/RW	(Italy)	Merate	14 May 1986 (aged 31)	15	0	1	0	Free agent	31 January 2017	Free	30 June 2019
12	Henrique Sereno	CB	(Portugal)	Elvas	18 May 1985 (aged 32)	1	0	–	–	Atlético Kolkata (India)	31 January 2017	Free	30 June 2017
14	Ángel Trujillo	CB	(Spain) (Community of Madrid)	Madrid	8 September 1987 (aged 29)	134	1	–	–	Levante	5 August 2016	Free	30 June 2019
21	Nano	LB	(Spain) (Andalusia)	Málaga	27 October 1984 (aged 32)	37	0	–	–	Panathinaikos (Greece)	24 August 2016	Free	30 June 2018
23	Jorge Morcillo	CB/LB	(Spain) (Valencian Community)	Valencia	11 March 1986 (aged 31)	67	5	–	–	Rayo Vallecano	4 July 2015	Free	30 June 2018
35	Javi Pérez	LB	(Spain) (Andalusia)	Almería	22 October 1995 (aged 21)	–	–	–	–	Almería B	6 September 2016	Free	30 June 2017
36	Carlos Garrido	CB/RB	(Spain) (Andalusia)	Alcalá la Real	6 June 1996 (aged 21)	1	0	–	–	Almería B	28 January 2017	Free	30 June 2017
46	Antonio Navas	RB	(Spain) (Andalusia)	El Ejido	13 February 1995 (aged 22)	1	0	–	–	Almería B	6 September 2016	Free	30 June 2017
Midfielders
5	Borja Fernández	CM/DM	(Spain) (Galicia (Spain))	Ourense	14 January 1981 (aged 36)	20	2	–	–	Atlético Kolkata (India)	17 January 2017	Free	30 June 2017
6	Pape Maly Diamanka	CM	(Senegal)	Dakar	10 January 1990 (aged 27)	17	0	–	–	Zaragoza	22 July 2016	Free	30 June 2018
8	Ramon Azeez	CM/DM	(Nigeria)	Abuja	12 December 1992 (aged 24)	78	4	4	0	Almería B	28 June 2013	Free	30 June 2017
11	Javi Álamo	RW/LW/RB	(Spain) (Canary Islands)	Gáldar	18 August 1988 (aged 28)	6	0	–	–	Osasuna	17 January 2017	Free	30 June 2018
15	Corona (c)	CM/DM/AM	(Spain) (Castilla–La Mancha)	Talavera	12 February 1981 (aged 36)	333	22	–	–	Brisbane Roar (Australia)	15 July 2016	Free	30 June 2017
16	Fidel	LW/RW	(Spain) (Andalusia)	Dehesa de Ríotinto	27 October 1989 (aged 27)	40	8	–	–	Córdoba	19 July 2016	€500K	30 June 2021
17	Antonio Puertas	RW/LW/ST	(Spain) (Andalusia)	Benahadux	21 February 1992 (aged 25)	53	8	–	–	Almería B	14 June 2015	Free	30 June 2017
24	Joaquín	DM/CB	(Spain) (Andalusia)	Huércal de Almería	31 May 1996 (aged 21)	39	0	–	–	Almería B	14 October 2015	Free	30 June 2021
25	Karim Yoda	LW/RW	(France)	Annemasse	25 October 1988 (aged 28)	3	0	–	–	Getafe	31 January 2017	Loan	30 June 2017
31	Gaspar	LW	(Spain) (Castilla–La Mancha)	Tarazona la Mancha	9 December 1997 (aged 19)	8	1	–	–	Almería B	11 September 2014	Free	30 June 2018
49	Francisco Callejón	CM	(Spain) (Andalusia)	Almería	15 May 1998 (aged 19)	1	0	–	–	Almería B	8 April 2017	Free	Undisclosed
Forwards
9	Quique González	SS/RW/LW	(Spain) (Castile and León)	Valladolid	16 May 1990 (aged 27)	89	33	–	–	Guadalajara	21 May 2014	Free	30 June 2021
10	José Ángel Pozo	ST	(Spain) (Andalusia)	Málaga	15 March 1996 (aged 21)	69	5	–	–	Manchester City (England)	31 August 2015	€500K	30 June 2020
18	Juanjo Expósito	ST	(Spain) (Cantabria)	Santander	28 October 1985 (aged 31)	21	0	–	–	Llagostera	16 August 2016	Free	30 June 2017
19	Jonathan Zongo	ST/RW	(Burkina Faso)	Ouagadougou	6 April 1989 (aged 28)	106	7	18	2	Almería B	1 August 2011	Free	30 June 2017
20	Kalu Uche	SS/ST/AM	(Nigeria)	Aba	15 November 1982 (aged 34)	212	45	36	5	Pune City (India)	24 February 2017	Free	30 June 2017
40	Jesús Sillero	ST	(Spain) (Andalusia)	Seville	28 October 1995 (aged 21)	1	0	–	–	Almería B	6 September 2016	Free	30 June 2017

== Coaches ==
Name	Nat.	Place of birth	Date of birth (age)	Signed from	Date signed	Role	Departure	Manner	Contract End
Fernando Soriano	(Spain) (Aragon)	Zaragoza	24 September 1979 (aged 37)	Player	17 May 2016	Permanent	26 February 2017	Sacked	30 June 2017
Fran Fernández	(Spain) (Andalusia)	Almería	20 March 1980 (aged 37)	Almería B	26 February 2017	Interim	14 March 2017	Ended tenure	30 June 2017
Luis Miguel Ramis	(Spain) (Catalonia)	Tarragona	25 July 1970 (aged 46)	Free agent	14 March 2017	Permanent			30 June 2017

=== Staff members ===
Name	Staff role
José Manuel Gil	Assistant coach
De la Torre	Fitness coach
Sergio Pardo	Fitness coach
Ángel Férez	Goalkeeping coach
Pepe Morales	Scout
Pablo Berenguel	Doctor
Fran Simón	Physio
Pedro Serrano	Physio

Source: UD Almería's official website

== Transfers ==
=== In ===
No.	Pos.	Nat.	Name	Age	EU	Moving from	Type	Transfer window	Ends	Transfer fee	Source
—	DF	(Spain)	Carlos Selfa	24	EU	Almería B	Promoted	Summer	2018	Free	La Voz de Almería
—	DF	(Spain)	Míchel Zabaco	26	EU	Cultural Leonesa	Loan return	Summer	2017	Free	
18	DF	(Spain)	Antonio Marín	20	EU	Almería B	Promoted	Summer	2019	Free	La Voz de Almería
—	DF	(Cameroon)	Charlie Took	23	EU	Almería B	Promoted	Summer	2017	Free	La Voz de Almería
15	MF	(Spain)	Corona	35	EU	Brisbane Roar (Australia)	Transfer	Summer	2017	Free	The Courier-Mail Archived 2016-07-16 at the Wayback Machine(subscription required)
16	MF	(Spain)	Fidel	26	EU	Córdoba	Transfer	Summer	2021	€500K	Almería
5	DF	(Spain)	Alex Quintanilla	26	EU	Barakaldo	Transfer	Summer	2018	Free	Almería
6	MF	(Senegal)	Pape Maly Diamanka	26	EU	Zaragoza	Transfer	Summer	2018	Free	Almería
14	DF	(Spain)	Ángel Trujillo	28	EU	Levante	Transfer	Summer	2019	Free	Almería
18	FW	(Spain)	Juanjo Expósito	30	EU	Llagostera	Transfer	Summer	2017	Free	Almería
21	DF	(Spain)	Nano	31	EU	Panathinaikos (Greece)	Transfer	Summer	2018	Free	Almería
2	DF	(Spain)	Isidoro	30	EU	Elche	Transfer	Summer	2017	Free	Almería
5	MF	(Spain)	Borja Fernández	36	EU	Atlético Kolkata (India)	Transfer	Winter	2017	Free	Almería
11	MF	(Spain)	Javi Álamo	28	EU	Osasuna	Transfer	Winter	2018	Free	Almería
12	DF	(Portugal)	Henrique Sereno	31	EU	Atlético Kolkata (India)	Transfer	Winter	2017	Free	Almería
7	DF	(Italy)	Marco Motta	30	EU	Free agent	Transfer	Winter	2019	Free	Almería
25	MF	(France)	Karim Yoda	28	EU	Getafe	Loan	Winter	2017	Free	Almería
20	FW	(Nigeria)	Kalu Uche	34	EU	Free agent	Transfer	Winter	2017	Free	Almería

Total spending: ▼€500,000

=== Out ===
No.	Pos.	Nat.	Name	Age	EU	Moving to	Type	Transfer window	Transfer fee	Source
8	MF	(Ghana)	Mohammed Fatau	23	EU	Granada	Loan return	Summer	Free	La Voz de Almería
25	MF	(Chile)	Lolo Reyes	25	Non-EU	Betis	Loan return	Summer	Free	La Voz de Almería
6	DF	(Montenegro)	Esteban Saveljich	25	EU	Racing Club (Argentina)	Loan return	Summer	Free	La Voz de Almería
11	MF	(Argentina)	Juan Ramírez	23	EU	Colorado Rapids (United States)	Loan return	Summer	Free	La Voz de Almería
5	DF	(Spain)	Carlos Cuéllar	34	EU	Free agent	Contract Ended	Summer	Free	
16	DF	(Uruguay)	Ernesto Goñi	31	EU	Free agent	Contract ended	Summer	Free	La Voz de Almería
2	DF	(Brazil)	Michel Macedo	26	EU	Las Palmas	Contract ended	Summer	Free	La Voz de Almería
14	FW	(Nigeria)	Kalu Uche	33	EU	Free agent	Contract ended	Summer	Free	Voz de Almería
—	DF	(Spain)	Michel Zabaco	27	EU	Cartagena	Contract rescinded	Summer	Free	FC Cartagena
—	MF	(Spain)	Carlos Selfa	24	EU	Linense	Loan	Summer	Free	La Voz de Almería
—	DF	(Spain)	Antonio Marín	20	EU	Granada B	Loan	Summer	Free	Almería
—	DF	(Cameroon)	Charlie Took	23	EU	Arandina	Contract rescinded	Summer	Free	Vavel
11	DF	(Argentina)	Sebastián Dubarbier	30	EU	Estudiantes de La Plata (Argentina)	Contract rescinded	Winter	Free	UD Almería
5	DF	(Spain)	Alex Quintanilla	26	EU	Mirandés	Contract rescinded	Winter	Free	UD Almería
28	DF	(Spain)	Josema	20	EU	Murcia	Loan	Winter	Free	Real Murcia
22	MF	(Spain)	Iván Sánchez	24	EU	Albacete	Loan	Winter	Free	UD Almería
7	MF	(Spain)	Iago Díaz	23	EU	Cultural Leonesa	Loan	Winter	Free	Cultural Leonesa
20	MF	(Spain)	José Ángel	24	EU	Free agent	Contract rescinded	Winter	Free	UD Almería
		(Spain)	Fernando Soriano	37	EU	Free agent	Contract rescinded	Winter	Free	UD Almería

Total gaining: ▲€0

Balance

Total: ▼€500,000

=== Contracts ===
No.	Pos.	Nat.	Name	Age	Status	Contract length	Expiry date	Source
26	MF	(Spain)	Joaquín	20	Signed	4 years	June 2021	UD Almería
9	FW	(Spain)	Quique González	26	Signed	4 years	June 2021	UD Almería

== Player statistics ==
=== Squad statistics ===
As of 29 June 2017

No.	Pos	Nat	Player	Total		Segunda División		Copa del Rey	
No.	Pos	Nat	Player	Apps	Goals	Apps	Goals	Apps	Goals
1	GK	(Spain) ESP	Julián Cuesta	2	0	1	0	1	0
2	DF	(Spain) ESP	Isidoro	10	0	6+3	0	1	0
3	DF	(Spain) ESP	Fran Vélez	24	1	19+5	1	0	0
4	DF	(Spain) ESP	Ximo Navarro	37	2	37	2	0	0
5	MF	(Spain) ESP	Borja Fernández	20	2	18+2	2	0	0
6	MF	(Senegal) SEN	Pape Maly Diamanka	17	0	9+8	0	0	0
7	DF	(Italy) ITA	Marco Motta	15	0	15	0	0	0
8	MF	(Nigeria) NGR	Ramon Azeez	22	2	17+5	2	0	0
9	FW	(Spain) ESP	Quique González	42	16	37+4	16	1	0
10	FW	(Spain) ESP	José Ángel Pozo	36	0	29+7	0	0	0
11	MF	(Spain) ESP	Javi Álamo	6	0	4+2	0	0	0
12	DF	(Portugal) POR	Henrique Sereno	1	0	1	0	0	0
13	GK	(Spain) ESP	Casto	41	0	41	0	0	0
14	DF	(Spain) ESP	Ángel Trujillo	21	0	20+1	0	0	0
15	MF	(Spain) ESP	Corona	21	0	4+16	0	1	0
16	MF	(Spain) ESP	Fidel	40	8	37+3	8	0	0
17	MF	(Spain) ESP	Antonio Puertas	39	8	34+5	8	0	0
18	FW	(Spain) ESP	Juanjo Expósito	21	0	3+17	0	1	0
19	FW	(Burkina Faso) BFA	Jonathan Zongo	3	0	2+1	0	0	0
20	FW	(Nigeria) NGR	Kalu Uche	13	2	5+8	2	0	0
21	DF	(Spain) ESP	Nano	37	0	37	0	0	0
23	DF	(Spain) ESP	Jorge Morcillo	31	2	29+2	2	0	0
24	MF	(Spain) ESP	Joaquín	37	0	35+1	0	1	0
25	MF	(France) FRA	Karim Yoda	3	0	0+3	0	0	0
31	MF	(Spain) ESP	Gaspar	7	1	0+7	1	0	0
35	DF	(Spain) ESP	Javi Pérez	0	0	0	0	0	0
36	DF	(Spain) ESP	Carlos Garrido	1	0	1	0	0	0
40	FW	(Spain) ESP	Jesús Sillero	1	0	0	0	0+1	0
42	GK	(Spain) ESP	Albert Batalla	0	0	0	0	0	0
46	DF	(Spain) ESP	Antonio Navas	1	0	0	0	0+1	0
49	MF	(Spain) ESP	Francisco Callejón	1	0	0+1	0	0	0
Players on loan to other clubs:
7	MF	(Spain) ESP	Iago Díaz	12	0	3+8	0	1	0
12	FW	(Spain) ESP	Chuli	12	0	5+6	0	0+1	0
22	MF	(Spain) ESP	Iván Sánchez	10	0	1+8	0	1	0
28	DF	(Spain) ESP	Josema	1	0	0	0	1	0
—	DF	(Spain) ESP	Antonio Marín	0	0	0	0	0	0
—	MF	(Spain) ESP	Carlos Selfa	0	0	0	0	0	0
Players who have left the club after the start of the season:
5	DF	(Spain) ESP	Alex Quintanilla	2	0	1	0	1	0
11	DF	(Argentina) ARG	Sebastián Dubarbier	2	0	1+1	0	0	0
20	MF	(Spain) ESP	José Ángel	13	0	10+2	0	1	0

=== Top scorers ===
Place	Position	Nation	Number	Name	Segunda División	Copa del Rey	Total
1	FW	(Spain)	9	Quique González	16	0	16
2	MF	(Spain)	16	Fidel	8	0	8
2	MF	(Spain)	17	Antonio Puertas	8	0	8
3	DF	(Spain)	4	Ximo Navarro	2	0	2
3	MF	(Spain)	5	Borja Fernández	2	0	2
3	MF	(Nigeria)	8	Ramon Azeez	2	0	2
3	FW	(Nigeria)	20	Kalu Uche	2	0	2
3	DF	(Spain)	23	Jorge Morcillo	2	0	2
4	DF	(Spain)	3	Fran Vélez	1	0	1
4	MF	(Spain)	31	Gaspar	1	0	1
				TOTALS	44	0	44

=== Disciplinary record ===
Number	Nation	Position	Name	Segunda División		Copa del Rey		Total	
Number	Nation	Position	Name	Yellow card	Red card	Yellow card	Red card	Yellow card	Red card
23	(Spain)	DF	Jorge Morcillo	17	0	0	0	17	0
24	(Spain)	MF	Joaquín	11	0	0	0	11	0
4	(Spain)	DF	Ximo Navarro	10	0	0	0	10	0
21	(Spain)	DF	Nano	10	0	0	0	10	0
16	(Spain)	MF	Fidel	9	1	0	0	9	1
3	(Spain)	DF	Fran Vélez	8	1	0	0	8	1
17	(Spain)	MF	Antonio Puertas	8	0	0	0	8	0
6	(Senegal)	MF	Pape Maly Diamanka	6	2	0	0	6	2
14	(Spain)	DF	Ángel Trujillo	6	0	0	0	6	0
5	(Spain)	MF	Borja Fernández	5	0	0	0	5	0
7	(Italy)	DF	Marco Motta	4	0	0	0	4	0
15	(Spain)	MF	Corona	4	0	0	0	4	0
18	(Spain)	FW	Juanjo Expósito	4	0	0	0	4	0
20	(Spain)	MF	José Ángel	3	0	1	0	4	0
8	(Nigeria)	MF	Ramon Azeez	3	1	0	0	3	1
10	(Spain)	FW	José Ángel Pozo	3	0	0	0	3	0
12	(Spain)	FW	Chuli	3	0	0	0	3	0
13	(Spain)	GK	Casto	3	0	0	0	3	0
5	(Spain)	DF	Alex Quintanilla	1	1	0	0	1	1
2	(Spain)	DF	Isidoro	1	0	0	0	1	0
7	(Spain)	MF	Iago Díaz	1	0	0	0	1	0
9	(Spain)	FW	Quique González	1	0	0	0	1	0
12	(Portugal)	DF	Henrique Sereno	1	0	0	0	1	0
22	(Spain)	MF	Iván Sánchez	1	0	0	0	1	0
31	(Spain)	MF	Gaspar	1	0	0	0	1	0
			TOTALS	124	6	1	0	125	6

== Competitions ==
=== Pre-season/Friendlies ===
23 July 2016	Almería	3 – 0	Almería B	Almería
	Ximo Navarro 10'; Pozo 14'; Chuli 20'	Report		Stadium: Juegos Mediterráneos

27 July 2016	Águilas	0 – 4	Almería	Águilas
	Juanjo (yellow card); Manzano (yellow card)	Report	9' Corona; 57' (yellow card) Chuli; (yellow card) 69' Joaquín; 79' Jonathan; 87' Iago Díaz	Stadium: El Rubial; Referee: Sánchez Navarro

3 August 2016	Almería	1 – 0	UCAM Murcia	Murcia
	Ximo Navarro (yellow card) 25'; Pozo 57'	Report	(yellow card) 38' Nono	Stadium: Pinatar Arena; Referee: Jorge Díaz Escudero

6 August 2016	Almería	2 – 2	Levante	Murcia
	Quintanilla (yellow card) 16'; Antonio Puertas 21'; Fran Vélez (yellow card) 41'; Pozo 79' (yellow card) 84'	Report	48' Roger; 82' Rafael Martins	Stadium: Pinatar Arena; Referee: Juan Antonio Campos Salinas

10 August 2016	Almería	2 – 1	Sevilla Atlético	Marbella
	Azeez 28'; Chuli 35'; José Ángel (yellow card) 58'; Diamanka (yellow card) 88'	Report	(yellow card) 42' Lasso; (yellow card) 55' Schetino; 76' Curro	Stadium: Marbella Football Center; Referee: José Antonio Martínez Tejada

=== Segunda División ===
Pos	Team	Pld	W	D	L	GF	GA	GD	Pts	Promotion, qualification or relegation
13	Sevilla Atlético	42	13	14	15	55	56	−1	53 (Note: Rayo Vallecano finished ahead of Sevilla Atlético on head-to-head points: Rayo Vallecano 1–1 Sevilla Atlético, Sevilla Atlético 1–2 Rayo Vallecano)	Ineligible for promotion and the Copa del Rey
14	Gimnàstic	42	12	16	14	47	51	−4	52	
15	Almería	42	14	9	19	44	49	−5	51	
16	Zaragoza	42	12	14	16	50	52	−2	50 (Note: Zaragoza and Numancia finished ahead of Alcorcón on head-to-head points: Zaragoza 7 pts, Numancia 7 pts, Alcorcón 2 pts. Zaragoza finished ahead of Numancia on head-to-head goal difference: Numancia 2–1 Zaragoza, Zaragoza 3–0 Numancia)	
17	Numancia	42	11	17	14	40	49	−9	50	

Source: La Liga
Rules for classification: 1) points; 2) head-to-head points; 3) head-to-head goal difference; 4) goal difference; 5) number of goals scored

==== Results summary ====
Overall								Home						Away					
Pld	W	D	L	GF	GA	GD	Pts	W	D	L	GF	GA	GD	W	D	L	GF	GA	GD
42	14	9	19	44	49	−5	51	11	6	3	33	15	+18	3	3	16	11	34	−23

Last updated: 27 June 2017.
Source: Competitive matches

==== Results by round ====
Round	1	2	3	4	5	6	7	8	9	10	11	12	13	14	15	16	17	18	19	20	21	22	23	24	25	26	27	28	29	30	31	32	33	34	35	36	37	38	39	40	41	42
Ground	H	A	H	A	H	A	H	A	H	A	H	A	H	A	H	A	A	H	A	H	A	A	H	A	H	A	H	A	H	A	H	A	H	A	H	A	H	H	A	H	A	H
Result	D	L	W	D	L	L	D	L	D	D	W	L	W	L	W	D	L	W	L	L	L	L	W	L	D	L	L	W	D	L	W	W	D	L	W	W	L	W	L	W	L	W
Position	11	21	9	11	16	20	19	21	21	21	18	21	19	20	16	17	20	17	19	22	22	22	20	20	20	22	22	21	21	21	20	20	19	19	19	16	16	17	17	17	18	15

Updated to match(es) played on 27 June 2017. Source:
A = Away; H = Home; W = Win; D = Draw; L = Loss

==== Matches ====
19 August 2016 1	Almería	1 – 1	Cádiz	Almería
22:00	Azeez 69'; Fran Vélez (yellow card) 80'	Report	(yellow card) 53' Mantecón; 61' Ortuño; (yellow card) 66' Juanjo	Stadium: Juegos Mediterráneos; Attendance: 8,771; Referee: Francisco Arias López

27 August 2016 2	Oviedo	2 – 0	Almería	Oviedo
19:00	Jonathan Pereira (yellow card) 48'; Nando 54' (yellow card) 61'; Linares (yellow card) 77'; Toché 86'	Report	(yellow card) 37' (red card) 60' Diamanka; (yellow card) 51' Iago Díaz; (yellow card) 60' Morcillo; (yellow card) 60' Ximo Navarro	Stadium: Carlos Tartiere; Attendance: 12,604; Referee: Adrián Cordero Vega

3 September 2016 3	Almería	3 – 0	Rayo Vallecano	Almería
18:00	Antonio Puertas 42'; Azeez 45'; Fidel 76'	Report	(yellow card) 36' Ebert; (yellow card) 38' Zuculini	Stadium: Juegos Mediterráneos; Attendance: 7,826; Referee: Javier Alberola Rojas

11 September 2016 4	Girona	3 – 3	Almería	Girona
20:00	Herrera (yellow card) 18'; Pons 39'; Sandaza 41' (yellow card) 55'; Longo 83'; Coris (yellow card) 87'	Report	(yellow card) 19' Fran Vélez; 29' Quique; (yellow card) 45' Nano; 47' Antonio Puertas; (yellow card) 75' Corona; 78' Fidel; (yellow card) 86' Trujillo	Stadium: Montilivi; Attendance: 4,917; Referee: Víctor Areces Franco

18 September 2016 5	Almería	0 – 1	Tenerife	Almería
12:00	Trujillo (yellow card) 5'; Nano (yellow card) 34'; Diamanka (yellow card) 86'	Report	(yellow card) 34' Lozano; (yellow card) 37' Crosas; 82' (o.g.) Ximo Navarro; (yellow card) 90+2' Camille	Stadium: Juegos Mediterráneos; Attendance: 7,950; Referee: Guillermo Cuadra Fernández

21 September 2016 6	UCAM Murcia	4 – 0	Almería	Murcia
22:00	Tito 14'; Góngora 56' (pen.); Kitoko (yellow card) 57'; Natalio 64'; Juanma 90+1'	Report	(yellow card) 26' Fidel; (yellow card) 32' (red card) 60' Quintanilla; (yellow card) 44' Joaquín; (yellow card) 55' Diamanka	Stadium: La Condomina; Attendance: 2,985; Referee: David Pérez Pallas

24 September 2016 7	Almería	0 – 0	Lugo	Almería
18:00	Azeez (yellow card) 38' (red card) 65'	Report	(yellow card) 51' Seoane; (yellow card) 72' Miquel; (yellow card) 83' Perea; (yellow card) 90+4' Calavera	Stadium: Juegos Mediterráneos; Attendance: 6,882; Referee: Saúl Ais Reig

1 October 2016 8	Huesca	2 – 0	Almería	Huesca
16:00	Juanjo 36'; Vadillo 51'; Vera (yellow card) 90+2'	Report	(yellow card) 41' Antonio Puertas; (yellow card) 45' Diamanka; (yellow card) 50' Joaquín; (yellow card) 63' Morcillo	Stadium: El Alcoraz; Attendance: 2,538; Referee: Oliver de la Fuente Ramos

9 October 2016 9	Almería	2 – 2	Levante	Almería
18:00	Joaquín (yellow card) 4'; Quique 16' (pen.) 90'; Nano; Morcillo (yellow card) 88'; Trujillo (yellow card) 90+4'	Report	(yellow card) 32' Iván López; 47' Roger; 55' Jason	Stadium: Juegos Mediterráneos; Attendance: 7,308; Referee: Juan Pulido Santana

15 October 2016 10	Alcorcón	0 – 0	Almería	Alcorcón
18:00	David Navarro (yellow card) 22'; Toribio (yellow card) 52'; Manuel (yellow card) 70'; Iván González (yellow card) 90+4'	Report	(yellow card) 8' (red card) 24' Fran Vélez; (yellow card) 15' Fidel; (yellow card) 34' Joaquín; (yellow card) 73' Morcillo; (yellow card) 77' Casto; (yellow card) 90+4' Juanjo	Stadium: Santo Domingo; Attendance: 2,276; Referee: Aitor Gorostegui Fernández Ortega

23 October 2016 11	Almería	3 – 0	Gimnàstic	Almería
17:00	Antonio Puertas 28' 68'; Quique (yellow card) 70' (goal) 90+2'; Trujillo (yellow card) 72'; Fidel (yellow card) 85'	Report	(yellow card) 19' (red card) 52' Valentín; (yellow card) 32' Molina; (yellow card) 85' Muñiz	Stadium: Juegos Mediterráneos; Attendance: 7,223; Referee: Gorka Saguez Oscoz

29 October 2016 12	Zaragoza	2 – 1	Almería	Zaragoza
19:00	Ros 14' (yellow card) 41'; Lanzarote (yellow card) 60'; Ángel 68'; José Enrique (yellow card) 70'; Zapater (yellow card) 78'; Silva (yellow card) 80'		(yellow card) 31' Morcillo; (yellow card) 45' Ximo Navarro; (yellow card) 67' Fran Vélez; 79' (pen.) Quique; (yellow card) 80' Chuli; (yellow card) 84' Iván Sánchez	Stadium: La Romareda; Attendance: 15,184; Referee: Isidro Diaz de Mera

6 November 2016 13	Almería	3 – 1	Córdoba	Almería
20:00	Fidel 14'; Quique 23'; José Ángel (yellow card) 26'; Fran Vélez 38'		(yellow card) 19' Ramos; 45' (o.g.) Trujillo; (yellow card) 55' Rodas; (yellow card) 82' Rodri	Stadium: Juegos Mediterráneos; Attendance: 8,017; Referee: Pablo González Fuertes

13 November 2016 14	Sevilla Atlético	1 – 0	Almería	Seville
18:00	González 13' (yellow card) 48' (red card) 72'; Cotán (yellow card) 50'; Ivil (yellow card) 50'; Schetino (yellow card) 90+4'		(penalty missed) 49' Quique; (yellow card) 50' Nano; (yellow card) 75' Fidel; (yellow card) 81' Chuli	Stadium: Ramón Sánchez Pizjuán; Attendance: 7,326; Referee: Dámaso Arcediano Monescillo

18 November 2016 15	Almería	2 – 1	Elche	Almería
22:00	Antonio Puertas 29'; Quique 58'; Morcillo (yellow card) 85'		14' (o.g.) Ximo Navarro; (yellow card) 26' Armando; (yellow card) 64' Álex; (yellow card) 78' Liberto; (yellow card) 89' Guillermo; (red card) 90+1' Nino	Stadium: Juegos Mediterráneos; Attendance: 6,988; Referee: Jorge Vldés Aller

26 November 2016 16	Valladolid	0 – 0	Almería	Valladolid
20:00	Mata (yellow card) 43' (red card) 64'	Report	(yellow card) 26' Morcillo; (yellow card) 59' (red card) 68' Diamanka	Stadium: José Zorrilla; Attendance: 7,495; Referee: David Medié Jiménez

3 December 2016 17	Numancia	1 – 0	Almería	Soria
18:15	Mateu 4'		(yellow card) 40' Ximo Navarro; (yellow card) 62' Joaquín	Stadium: Los Pajaritos; Attendance: 2,771; Referee: Eduardo Prieto Iglesias

11 December 2016 18	Almería	2 – 1	Mallorca	Almería
12:00	Trujillo (yellow card) 10'; Pozo (yellow card) 17'; Antonio Puertas 20' (yellow card) 87'; Fidel 54' (pen.); Morcillo (yellow card) 70'		(yellow card) 33' Brandon; (yellow card) 67' (goal) 85' Lekić; (yellow card) 70' Culio; (yellow card) 73' Company	Stadium: Juegos Mediterráneos; Attendance: 6,784; Referee: David Pérez Pallas

18 December 2016 19	Mirandés	2 – 1	Almería	Miranda de Ebro
18:00	Ortiz 59'; Maikel 70' (yellow card) 71'; Rúper (yellow card) 78'; Pedro (yellow card) 82'	Report 1	(yellow card) 7' Juanjo; (yellow card) 15' José Ángel; 47' Quique; (yellow card) 71' Morcillo	Stadium: Anduva; Attendance: 3,093; Referee: Valentín Pizarro Gómez

6 January 2017 20	Almería	0 – 1	Getafe	Almería
16:00	Diamanka (yellow card) 41'; Ximo Navarro (yellow card) 68'	Report	(yellow card) 28' Portillo; (yellow card) 41' Suárez; 87' Jorge Molina	Stadium: Juegos Mediterráneos; Attendance: 6,330; Referee: Rubén Eiriz Mata

15 January 2017 21	Reus	1 – 0	Almería	Reus
16:00	Máyor 32'	Report	(yellow card) 53' José Ángel; (yellow card) 56' Ximo Navarro; (yellow card) 68' Antonio Puertas; (yellow card) 76' Joaquín; (yellow card) 90+6' Corona	Stadium: Municipal; Attendance: 3,587; Referee: Francisco Manuel Arias López

22 January 2017 22	Cádiz	1 – 0	Almería	Cádiz
20:00	Sankaré (yellow card) 43' (yellow-red card); Abdullah (yellow card) 63'; Aitor García 83'	Report	(yellow card) 31' Morcillo; (yellow card) 33' Borja; (yellow card) 44' Fidel; (yellow card) 48' Fran Vélez; (yellow card) 88' Nano; (yellow card) 90+3' Chuli	Stadium: Ramón de Carranza; Attendance: 10,890; Referee: Pablo González

29 January 2017 23	Almería	3 – 0	Oviedo	Almeria
18:00	Borja 48' (yellow card) 49'; Trujillo (yellow card) 63'; Casto (yellow card) 80'; Quique 80'; Gaspar 86'	Report	(yellow card) 31' Torró; (yellow card) 46' Verdés	Stadium: Juegos Mediterráneos; Attendance: 7,014; Referee: David Medié Jiménez

5 February 2017 24	Rayo Vallecano	1 – 0	Almería	Madrid
16:00	Fran Vélez 7' (o.g.)	Report	Nano (yellow card) 12'	Stadium: Vallecas; Attendance: 7,816; Referee: Javier Alberola Rojas

11 February 2017 25	Almería	0 – 0	Girona	Almeria
16:00	Morcillo (yellow card) 57'; Motta (yellow card) 65'	Report	(yellow card) 2' Pons; (yellow card) 25' Longo; (yellow card) 45' Alcalá; (yellow card) 69' Maffeo; (yellow card) 88' Alcaraz	Stadium: Juegos Mediterráneos; Attendance: 7,004; Referee: Dámaso Arcediano Monescillo

18 February 2017 26	Tenerife	1 – 0	Almería	Santa Cruz de Tenerife
18:00	Cámara 9' (yellow card) 85'; Germán (yellow card) 68'; Suso (yellow card) 80'	Report	(yellow card) 16' Antonio Puertas; (yellow card) 26' Morcillo; (yellow card) 36' Sereno; (yellow card) 75' Corona	Stadium: Heliodoro Rodríguez López; Attendance: 12,137; Referee: Jorge Valdés Aller

26 February 2017 27	Almería	2 – 3	UCAM Murcia	Almeria
16:00	Corona (yellow card) 27'; Ximo Navarro 37'; Borja (yellow card) 41'; Fidel 47'; Juanjo (yellow card) 85'; Antonio Puertas (yellow card) 87'	Report	26' Basha; (yellow card) 43' Manuel; 54' (yellow card) 77' Salvador; 64' Tito	Stadium: Juegos Mediterráneos; Attendance: 5,949; Referee: Aitor Gorostegui Fernández Ortega

5 March 2017 28	Lugo	1 – 2	Almería	Lugo
18:00	Caballero 64' (yellow card) 71'; Vico (yellow card) 68'; Miquel (yellow card) 83'; Carlos Hernández (yellow card) 87'; Joselu (yellow card) 90'	Report	1' Quique; 51' Fidel; (yellow card) 59' Fran Vélez; (yellow card) 60' Isidoro; (yellow card) 65' Ximo Navarro; (yellow card) 79' Nano	Stadium: Anxo Carro; Attendance: 3,130; Referee: Oliver de la Fuente Ramos

12 March 2017 29	Almería	0 – 0	Huesca	Almería
12:00	Azeez (yellow card) 45'; Nano (yellow card) 52'; Joaquín (yellow card) 83'	Report	(yellow card) 62' Aguilera	Stadium: Juegos Mediterráneos; Attendance: 7,185; Referee: Adrián Cordero Vega

19 March 2017 30	Levante	1 – 0	Almería	Valencia
12:00	Roger 38' (pen.); Lerma (yellow card) 55'; Jason (yellow card) 66'	Report	(yellow card) 13' Ximo Navarro; (yellow card) 37' Nano; (yellow card) 50' Joaquín; (yellow card) 90' Pozo; (yellow card) 90' Azeez; (yellow card) 90+3' Fidel	Stadium: Ciutat de València; Attendance: 10,504; Referee: David Pérez Pallas

25 March 2017 31	Almería	3 – 1	Alcorcón	Almería
18:00	Quique 27' 68'; Pozo (yellow card) 39'; Joaquín (yellow card) 53'; Fidel (yellow card) 70'; Casto (yellow card) 90+1'; Antonio Puertas 90+2'	Report	(yellow card) 36' Bellvís; (yellow card) 61' Alejo; 66' David Rodríguez; (yellow card) 69' Elgezabal	Stadium: Juegos Mediterráneos; Attendance: 6,419; Referee: Isidro Díaz de Mera

2 April 2017 32	Gimnàstic	0 – 1	Almería	Tarragona
12:00	Tejera (yellow card) 83'; Zahibo (yellow card) 90+4'	Report	(yellow card) 17' Joaquín; (yellow card) 42' Morcillo; 72' Uche; (yellow card) 88' Ximo Navarro; (yellow card) 90+1' Juanjo	Stadium: Nou Estadi; Attendance: 6,357; Referee: Aitor Gorostegui Fernández Ortega

9 April 2017 33	Almería	2 – 2	Zaragoza	Almería
20:30	Morcillo 16'; Antonio Puertas (yellow card) 25'; Fidel (yellow card) 30' (yellow-red card); Quique 45'; Borja (yellow card) 75'	Report	4' (yellow card) 59' Bedia; 7' Ángel	Stadium: Juegos Mediterráneos; Attendance: 7,520; Referee: Víctor Areces Franco

16 April 2017 34	Córdoba	1 – 0	Almería	Córdoba
18:00	Caro (yellow card) 2'; Marković 13'; Rodri (yellow card) 89'	Report	(yellow card) 62' Morcillo; (yellow card) 88' Gaspar	Stadium: Nuevo Arcángel; Attendance: 11,286; Referee: Gorka Sagues Oscoz

23 April 2017 35	Almería	2 – 1	Sevilla Atlético	Almería
18:00	Morcillo (yellow card) 19'; Uche 25'; Motta (yellow card) 59'; Fidel 69'	Report	90' Carrillo; (yellow card) 90+4' Lasso	Stadium: Juegos Mediterráneos; Attendance: 7,314; Referee: Valentín Pizarro Gómez

30 April 2017 36	Elche	2 – 3	Almería	Elche
17:00	Armando (yellow card) 16'; Rober (yellow card) 45'; Pelayo 53'; Borja Valle (yellow card) 75'; Malonga 90+3'; Liberto (yellow card) 90+4'	Report	27' Borja; (yellow card) 33' (goal) 64' Ximo Navarro; (yellow card) 43' Fidel; 73' Quique; (yellow card) 80' Fran Vélez; (yellow card) 84' Antonio Puertas; (yellow card) 90+2' Motta	Stadium: Martínez Valero; Attendance: 8,004; Referee: Isidro Díaz de Mera

7 May 2017 37	Almería	0 – 3	Valladolid	Almería
13:00	Nano (yellow card) 85'; Joaquín (yellow card) 88'	Report	34' De Tomás; (yellow card) 58' Espinoza; 90' (pen.) Mata; 90+4' Jordán	Stadium: Juegos Mediterráneos; Attendance: 8,868; Referee: David Pérez Pallas

13 May 2017 38	Almería	2 – 0	Numancia	Almería
18:30	Fidel 7'; Motta (yellow card) 30'; Antonio Puertas 33' (yellow card) 34'; Morcillo (yellow card) 60'; Borja (yellow card) 68'	Report	(yellow card) 35' Ruiz de Galarreta; (yellow card) 58' Nacho; (yellow card) 74' Nieto	Stadium: Juegos Mediterráneos; Attendance: 8,005; Referee: Pablo González Fuertes

20 May 2017 39	Mallorca	1 – 0	Almería	Palma
19:00	Brandon 34'; Moutinho (yellow card) 58'	Report	(yellow card) 34' Morcillo; (yellow card) 90+1' Ximo Navarro	Stadium: Iberostar Stadium; Attendance: 12,830; Referee: Rubén Eiriz Mata

27 May 2017 40	Almería	2 – 0	Mirandés	Almería
18:00	Quique 29' 82'; Fran Vélez (yellow card) 89'	Report	(yellow card) 57' Fran Cruz; (yellow card) 87' Kijera	Stadium: Juegos Mediterráneos; Attendance: 7,550; Referee: Javier Alberola Rojas

4 June 2017 41	Getafe	4 – 0	Almería	Getafe
20:00	Chuli 9' 21'; Díaz (yellow card) 63'; Cala 72'; Molina 79'	Report		Stadium: Coliseum Alfonso Pérez; Attendance: 10,426; Referee: Eduardo Prieto Iglesias

10 June 2017 42	Almería	1 – 0	Reus	Almería
20:30	Morcillo 15'	Report	(yellow card) 72' Edgar Hernández	Stadium: Juegos Mediterráneos; Attendance: 11,121; Referee: Aitor Gorostegui Fernández Ortega

=== Copa del Rey ===
6 September 2016 2	Almería	0 – 2	Rayo Vallecano	Almería
22:00	José Ángel (yellow card) 55'	Report	(yellow card) 10' (goal) 63' 89' Aguirre; (yellow card) 34' Amaya; (yellow card) 60' Comesaña; (yellow card) 67' Galán; (yellow card) 78' Zuculini; (yellow card) 89' Mojica	Stadium: Juegos Mediterráneos; Referee: Dámaso Arcediano Monescillo
