= Carlos Serrano (disambiguation) =

Carlos Serrano (born 1963) is a Colombian musician.

Carlos Serrano may also refer to:

- Carlos Gerardo Rodríguez Serrano (born 1985), Mexican footballer
- Carlos Garrido Serrano (born 1994), known as Carlos Garrido, Spanish footballer
- Carlos Serrano, a character in the TV series ReGenesis
- Carlos Serrano Zárate (born 1998), Columbian Paralympic swimmer
