= 2019–20 Granada CF season =

Granada
2019–20 season
- President: Jiang Lizhang
- Head coach: Diego Martínez
- Stadium: Nuevo Estadio de Los Cármenes
- La Liga: 7th
- Copa del Rey: Semi-finals
- Top goalscorer: League: Carlos Fernández (11); All: Carlos Fernández (14)
- Highest home attendance: 18,985 (vs Real Betis, 27 October 2019)
- Lowest home attendance: 14,127 (vs Levante, 14 December 2019)
- Average home league attendance: 16,376
- Biggest win: Granada 4–0 Athletic Bilbao
- Biggest defeat: Eibar 3–0 Granada
| Home colours | Away colours | Third colours |

The 2019–20 season was Granada CF's 86th season in existence and the club's first season back in the top flight of Spanish football. In addition to the domestic league, Granada participated in this season's edition of the Copa del Rey. The season was slated to cover a period from 1 July 2019 to 30 June 2020. It was extended extraordinarily beyond 30 June due to the COVID-19 pandemic in Spain.

== Players ==
=== Current squad ===
As of 24 January 2020

Note: Flags indicate national team as defined under FIFA eligibility rules; some limited exceptions apply. Players may hold more than one non-FIFA nationality.

| No. | Pos. | Nation | Player |
|---|---|---|---|
| 1 | GK | POR | Rui Silva |
| 2 | DF | GLP | Dimitri Foulquier (on loan from Watford) |
| 3 | DF | ESP | Álex Martínez |
| 4 | MF | FRA | Maxime Gonalons (on loan from Roma) |
| 5 | DF | ESP | José Martínez (on loan from Eibar) |
| 6 | DF | ESP | Germán (vice-captain) |
| 7 | MF | ESP | Álvaro Vadillo |
| 8 | MF | CMR | Yan Eteki |
| 9 | FW | ESP | Roberto Soldado |
| 10 | FW | ESP | Antonio Puertas |
| 11 | DF | TUR | İsmail Köybaşı |
| 12 | MF | NGR | Ramon Azeez |
| 13 | GK | ESP | Aarón |

| No. | Pos. | Nation | Player |
|---|---|---|---|
| 14 | MF | ESP | Fede Vico |
| 15 | DF | ESP | Carlos Neva |
| 16 | DF | ESP | Víctor Díaz (captain) |
| 17 | DF | ESP | Quini |
| 18 | DF | COL | Neyder Lozano |
| 19 | MF | ESP | Ángel Montoro |
| 20 | DF | ESP | Jesús Vallejo (on loan from Real Madrid) |
| 21 | MF | VEN | Yangel Herrera (on loan from Manchester City) |
| 22 | DF | POR | Domingos Duarte |
| 23 | FW | VEN | Darwin Machís |
| 24 | FW | ESP | Carlos Fernández (on loan from Sevilla) |

=== Reserve team ===
Note: Flags indicate national team as defined under FIFA eligibility rules; some limited exceptions apply. Players may hold more than one non-FIFA nationality.

| No. | Pos. | Nation | Player |
|---|---|---|---|
| 26 | MF | ESP | Antonio Aranda |
| 29 | MF | ESP | Isma |
| 31 | FW | ESP | Mario Rodríguez |

| No. | Pos. | Nation | Player |
|---|---|---|---|
| 32 | DF | ESP | Antonio Montoro |
| 35 | GK | ESP | Unai Etxebarría |
| 39 | DF | ESP | Pepe |

=== Out on loan ===
Note: Flags indicate national team as defined under FIFA eligibility rules; some limited exceptions apply. Players may hold more than one non-FIFA nationality.

| No. / Pos. / Nation / Player; — / DF / ESP / Bernardo Cruz (at (Spain) Numancia until 30 June 2020) | No. / Pos. / Nation / Player; — / MF / ESP / José Antonio González (at (Spain) Córdoba until 30 June 2020) |

== Transfers ==
=== In ===
| Date | Player | From | Type | Fee | Ref |
|---|---|---|---|---|---|
| 30 June 2019 | (Spain) Raúl Baena | (Australia) Melbourne Victory | Loan return | | |
| 30 June 2019 | (Peru) Sergio Peña | (Portugal) Tondela | Loan return | | |
| 30 June 2019 | (Spain) Pablo Vázquez | Cultural Leonesa | Loan return | | |
| 1 July 2019 | (Colombia) Neyder Lozano | Elche | Transfer | Free | |
| 1 July 2019 | (Spain) Fede Vico | Leganés | Buyout clause | €250K | |
| 14 July 2019 | (Portugal) Domingos Duarte | (Portugal) Sporting CP | Transfer | Undisclosed | |
| 15 July 2019 | (Spain) Roberto Soldado | (Turkey) Fenerbahçe | Transfer | Free | |
| 18 July 2019 | (Cameroon) Yan Eteki | Sevilla | Transfer | €1M | |
| 26 July 2019 | (Venezuela) Yangel Herrera | (England) Manchester City | Loan | | |
| 28 July 2019 | (Venezuela) Darwin Machís | (Italy) Udinese | Transfer | €3M | |
| 10 August 2019 | (Spain) José Antonio Martínez | Eibar | Loan | | |
| 14 August 2019 | (Spain) Carlos Fernández | Sevilla | Loan | | |
| 30 August 2019 | (Turkey) İsmail Köybaşı | (Turkey) Fenerbahçe | Transfer | Free | |
| 2 September 2019 | (France) Maxime Gonalons | (Italy) Roma | Loan | | |
| 2 January 2020 | (Guadeloupe) Dimitri Foulquier | (England) Watford | Loan | | |
| 24 January 2020 | (Spain) Jesús Vallejo | Real Madrid | Loan | | |

=== Out ===
| Date | Player | To | Type | Fee | Ref |
|---|---|---|---|---|---|
| 30 June 2019 | (Spain) José Antonio Martínez | Eibar | Loan return | | |
| 30 June 2019 | (Spain) Dani Ojeda | Leganés | Loan return | | |
| 30 June 2019 | (Spain) Alejandro Pozo | Sevilla Atlético | Loan return | | |
| 30 June 2019 | (Spain) Fede San Emeterio | Valladolid | Loan return | | |
| 5 July 2019 | (Spain) Adri Castellano | Numancia | Transfer | Undisclosed | |
| 5 July 2019 | (Spain) José Antonio González | Córdoba | Loan | | |
| 23 July 2019 | (Spain) Pablo Vázquez | Badajoz | Transfer | Free | |
| 3 August 2019 | (Peru) Sergio Peña | (Netherlands) Emmen | Transfer | Free | |
| 30 August 2019 | (Spain) Rodri | (England) Bristol City | Released | | |
| 2 September 2019 | (Spain) Bernardo Cruz | Alcorcón | Loan | | |
| 5 September 2019 | (Spain) Raúl Baena | (Greece) Atromitos | Transfer | Free | |
| 2 January 2020 | (Colombia) Adrián Ramos | (Colombia) América de Cali | Transfer | Free | |

== Pre-season and friendlies ==
Win Draw Loss

| 20 July 2019 Friendly | Granada | 1–0 | Reading | Marbella, Spain |
| 19:30 CEST (UTC+2) | Azeez 79' | Report | | Stadium: Estadio Municipal Antonio Lorenzo Cuevas; Attendance: 500 |

| 27 July 2019 Friendly | Alcorcón | 0–1 | Granada | Nerja, Spain |
| 10:30 CEST (UTC+2) | | Report | Díaz 29' | Stadium: Campo Municipal de Nerja; Attendance: 500 |

| 29 July 2019 Friendly | Granada | 1–0 | Almería | San Pedro de Alcántara, Spain |
| 19:30 CEST (UTC+2) | Azeez 45+2' | Report | | Stadium: Marbella Football Center; Attendance: 200 |

| 2 August 2019 Friendly | Granada | 2–1 | Valladolid | San Pedro de Alcántara, Spain |
| 19:30 CEST (UTC+2) | Soldado 13'; Puertas 28' | Report | Plano 45+1' | Stadium: Marbella Football Center; Attendance: 300 |

| 4 August 2019 Friendly | Granada | 2–0 | Las Palmas | San Pedro de Alcántara, Spain |
| 19:30 CEST (UTC+2) | Machís 48' (pen.); Rodri 81' | Report | | Stadium: Marbella Football Center; Attendance: 400 |

| 9 August 2019 Friendly | Granada | 2–1 | Sevilla | Granada, Spain |
| 21:00 CEST (UTC+2) | Germán 58'; Ramos 90' | Report | Diego Carlos 85' | Stadium: Nuevo Los Cármenes; Attendance: 12,000 |

== Competitions ==
Win Draw Loss

=== Overview ===
| Competition | First match | Last match | Starting round | Final position | Record | | | | | | | |
| Competition | First match | Last match | Starting round | Final position | Pld | W | D | L | GF | GA | GD | Win % |
|---|---|---|---|---|---|---|---|---|---|---|---|---|
| La Liga | 17 August 2019 | 19 July 2020 | Matchday 1 | 7th | 38 | 16 | 8 | 14 | 52 | 45 | +7 | 42.11 |
| Copa del Rey | 17 December 2019 | 5 March 2020 | First round | Semi-finals | 7 | 6 | 0 | 1 | 14 | 8 | +6 | 85.71 |
| Total | | | | | 45 | 22 | 8 | 15 | 66 | 53 | +13 | 48.89 |

Last updated: 19 July 2020
Source: Soccerway

=== La Liga ===
==== League table ====
| Pos | Team | Pld | W | D | L | GF | GA | GD | Pts | Qualification or relegation |
|---|---|---|---|---|---|---|---|---|---|---|
| 5 | Villarreal | 38 | 18 | 6 | 14 | 63 | 49 | +14 | 60 | Qualification for the Europa League group stage |
| 6 | Real Sociedad | 38 | 16 | 8 | 14 | 56 | 48 | +8 | 56 | Qualification for the Europa League group stage |
| 7 | Granada | 38 | 16 | 8 | 14 | 52 | 45 | +7 | 56 | Qualification for the Europa League second qualifying round (Note: The 2020 Copa del Rey Final was postponed due to the COVID-19 pandemic in Spain and could not be completed by the UEFA registration deadline of 3 August 2020, so the fifth- and sixth-placed teams in the 2019–20 La Liga, Villarreal and Real Sociedad, entered the 2020–21 UEFA Europa League at the group stage, and the seventh-placed team, Granada, entered at the second qualifying round.) |
| 8 | Getafe | 38 | 14 | 12 | 12 | 43 | 37 | +6 | 54 | |
| 9 | Valencia | 38 | 14 | 11 | 13 | 46 | 53 | −7 | 53 | |

Source: La Liga, Soccerway
Rules for classification: 1) Points; 2) Head-to-head points; 3) Head-to-head goal difference; 4) Goal difference; 5) Goals scored; 6) Fair-play points (Note: Head-to-head record is used only after all the matches between the teams in question have been played)

==== Results summary ====
| Overall | | | | | | | | Home | | | | | | Away | | | | | |
| Pld | W | D | L | GF | GA | GD | Pts | W | D | L | GF | GA | GD | W | D | L | GF | GA | GD |
|---|---|---|---|---|---|---|---|---|---|---|---|---|---|---|---|---|---|---|---|
| 38 | 16 | 8 | 14 | 52 | 45 | +7 | 56 | 10 | 3 | 6 | 26 | 16 | +10 | 6 | 5 | 8 | 26 | 29 | −3 |

Last updated: 19 July 2020.
Source: La Liga

==== Results by round ====
| Round | 1 | 2 | 3 | 4 | 5 | 6 | 7 | 8 | 9 | 10 | 11 | 12 | 13 | 14 | 15 | 16 | 17 | 18 | 19 | 20 | 21 | 22 | 23 | 24 | 25 | 26 | 27 | 28 | 29 | 30 | 31 | 32 | 33 | 34 | 35 | 36 | 37 | 38 |
|---|---|---|---|---|---|---|---|---|---|---|---|---|---|---|---|---|---|---|---|---|---|---|---|---|---|---|---|---|---|---|---|---|---|---|---|---|---|---|
| Ground | A | H | A | A | H | A | H | A | H | H | A | H | A | H | A | H | H | A | H | A | A | H | A | H | A | H | A | H | A | H | A | H | A | H | A | H | A | H |
| Result | D | L | W | W | W | D | W | L | W | W | L | L | L | D | L | W | L | L | W | L | L | W | L | W | W | D | D | W | D | L | D | L | W | D | W | L | W | W |
| Position | 9 | 14 | 9 | 6 | 3 | 5 | 2 | 4 | 3 | 2 | 3 | 6 | 8 | 8 | 10 | 9 | 9 | 11 | 10 | 10 | 11 | 10 | 10 | 9 | 9 | 9 | 9 | 9 | 9 | 10 | 9 | 10 | 9 | 10 | 9 | 10 | 9 | 7 |

Updated to match(es) played on 19 July 2020. Source: La Liga
A = Away; H = Home; W = Win; D = Draw; L = Loss

==== Matches ====
The La Liga schedule was announced on 4 July 2019.

| 17 August 2019 1 | Villarreal | 4–4 | Granada | Villarreal |
| 21:00 CEST (UTC+2) | Cazorla 35' (pen.), (yellow card) 36'; Albiol (yellow card) 45+3'; Gómez 53'; Gerard 65'; Zambo Anguissa (yellow card) 70'; Chukwueze 73' | Report | Vico 51' (pen.); Germán (yellow card) 59'; Machís 62'; Soldado 75'; Puertas 81' | Stadium: Estadio de la Cerámica; Attendance: 14,836; Referee: Adrián Cordero Vega |

| 23 August 2019 2 | Granada | 0–1 | Sevilla | Granada |
| 20:00 CEST (UTC+2) | Germán (yellow card) 45+5' | Report | Jordán 52'; Fernando (yellow card) 61' | Stadium: Nuevo Los Cármenes; Attendance: 15,880; Referee: José María Sánchez Martínez |

| 1 September 2019 3 | Espanyol | 0–3 | Granada | Cornellà de Llobregat |
| 19:00 CEST (UTC+2) | Corchia (yellow card) 2'; Naldo (yellow card) 40' | Report | Puertas 13'; Herrera (yellow card) 31'; Fernández 68', (yellow card) 84'; Azeez 74'; Montoro (yellow card) 80' | Stadium: RCDE Stadium; Attendance: 20,870; Referee: César Soto Grado |

| 15 September 2019 4 | Celta Vigo | 0–2 | Granada | Vigo |
| 16:00 CEST (UTC+2) | Jorge (red card) 11'; Beltrán (red card) 29'; Mina (yellow card) 39'; Suárez (yellow card) 45'; Mallo (yellow card) 62'; Araujo (yellow card) 74' | Report | Germán (yellow card) 19', (goal) 45+6'; Díaz (yellow card) 44'; Herrera 54' | Stadium: Abanca-Balaídos; Attendance: 18,259; Referee: Eduardo Prieto Iglesias |

| 21 September 2019 5 | Granada | 2–0 | Barcelona | Granada |
| 21:00 CEST (UTC+2) | Azeez 2'; Soldado (yellow card) 48'; Herrera (yellow card) 49'; Vadillo 66' (pen.); Fernández (yellow card) 87' | Report | Suárez (yellow card) 21'; Piqué (yellow card) 45+4' | Stadium: Nuevo Los Cármenes; Attendance: 18,880; Referee: Guillermo Cuadra Fernández |

| 24 September 2019 6 | Valladolid | 1–1 | Granada | Valladolid |
| 19:00 CEST (UTC+2) | Alcaraz (yellow card) 6'; Plano 12'; Sandro (yellow card) 35'; Kiko (yellow card) 71' | Report | Fernández 42'; Herrera (yellow card) 77'; Germán (yellow card) 90' | Stadium: José Zorrilla; Attendance: 18,595; Referee: Valentín Pizarro Gómez |

| 28 September 2019 7 | Granada | 1–0 | Leganés | Granada |
| 18:30 CEST (UTC+2) | Puertas 28', (yellow card) 45+6'; Machís (yellow card) 66'; Soldado (yellow card) 72' | Report | Navarro (yellow card) 27'; Mesa (yellow card) 65'; Omeruo (yellow card) 80'; Awaziem (yellow card) 87' | Stadium: Nuevo Los Cármenes; Attendance: 15,519; Referee: Adrián Cordero Vega |

| 5 October 2019 8 | Real Madrid | 4–2 | Granada | Madrid |
| 16:00 CEST (UTC+2) | Benzema 2'; Casemiro (yellow card) 43'; Hazard 45+1'; Carvajal (yellow card) 54'; Modrić 61'; Areola (yellow card) 68'; James 90+2', (yellow card) 90+3' | Report | Sánchez (yellow card) 54'; Soldado (yellow card) 56'; Machís 69' (pen.); Herrera (yellow card) 72'; Duarte (yellow card) 73', (goal) 78'; Puertas (yellow card) 81' | Stadium: Santiago Bernabéu; Attendance: 70,101; Referee: Santiago Jaime Latre |

| 18 October 2019 9 | Granada | 1–0 | Osasuna | Granada |
| 21:00 CEST (UTC+2) | Fernández (yellow card) 27'; Duarte 38'; Á. Martínez (yellow card) 66' | Report | Estupiñán (yellow card) 12'; Brandon (yellow card) 25'; Ávila (yellow card) 40'; Oier (yellow card) 54'; Aridane (yellow card) 78'; Moncayola (yellow card) 90'; Mérida (yellow card) 90+2' (yellow-red card) 90+2' | Stadium: Nuevo Los Cármenes; Attendance: 16,986; Referee: Xavier Estrada Fernández |

| 27 October 2019 10 | Granada | 1–0 | Real Betis | Granada |
| 14:00 CET (UTC+1) | Machís (yellow card) 9'; Herrera (yellow card) 24'; Vadillo 61'; Soldado (yellow card) 75' | Report | García (yellow card) 12'; Fekir (yellow card) 29'; Feddal (yellow card) 45'; Joaquín (yellow card) 80' | Stadium: Nuevo Los Cármenes; Attendance: 18,985; Referee: Antonio Mateu Lahoz |

| 31 October 2019 11 | Getafe | 3–1 | Granada | Getafe |
| 21:15 CET (UTC+1) | Suárez (yellow card) 17'; Ángel (yellow card) 18', (goal) 35'; Arambarri 41', (yellow card) 64'; Soria (yellow card) 81'; Timor 88'; Etxeita (yellow card) 90+4' | Report | Duarte (yellow card) 40'; Gonalons (yellow card) 55'; Germán (yellow card) 57'; Soldado (yellow card) 67'; Puertas 74'; Azeez (yellow card) 88' | Stadium: Coliseum Alfonso Pérez; Attendance: 10,227; Referee: José Luis González González |

| 3 November 2019 12 | Granada | 1–2 | Real Sociedad | Granada |
| 21:00 CET (UTC+1) | Vadillo 36' | Report | Portu 21', 89'; Le Normand (yellow card) 33'; Willian José (yellow card) 35' | Stadium: Nuevo Los Cármenes; Attendance: 16,921; Referee: Eduardo Prieto Iglesias |

| 9 November 2019 13 | Valencia | 2–0 | Granada | Valencia |
| 16:00 CET (UTC+1) | Wass 74'; Torres 90+7' | Report | Gonalons (yellow card) 39'; Azeez (yellow card) 44'; Quini (yellow card) 78'; Montoro (yellow card) 89'; Herrera (yellow card) 90+2' | Stadium: Mestalla; Attendance: 40,038; Referee: Xavier Estrada Fernández |

| 23 November 2019 14 | Granada | 1–1 | Atlético Madrid | Granada |
| 18:30 CET (UTC+1) | Soldado (yellow card) 31'; Montoro (yellow card) 43'; Puertas (yellow card) 54'; Gonalons (yellow card) 63'; Germán 67' | Report | Correa (yellow card) 28'; Felipe (yellow card) 39'; Lodi 60'; Llorente (yellow card) 66' | Stadium: Nuevo Los Cármenes; Attendance: 17,040; Referee: David Medié Jiménez |

| 1 December 2019 15 | Athletic Bilbao | 2–0 | Granada | Bilbao |
| 14:00 CET (UTC+1) | D. García (yellow card) 8'; R. García 41' (pen.), (yellow card) 81'; Córdoba (yellow card) 48'; Capa (yellow card) 50'; Sancet (yellow card) 53'; Berchiche 83' | Report | Duarte (yellow card) 36'; Silva (yellow card) 39'; Montoro (yellow card) 42'; Quini (yellow card) 90+1' | Stadium: San Mamés; Attendance: 37,974; Referee: Adrián Cordero Vega |

| 7 December 2019 16 | Granada | 3–0 | Alavés | Granada |
| 16:00 CET (UTC+1) | Fernández 48'; Soldado (yellow card) 51', (goal) 58' (pen.); Herrera 77' | Report | Navarro (yellow card) 28'; Wakaso (yellow card) 40' (yellow-red card) 67'; García (yellow card) 63'; Laguardia (red card) 90+1' | Stadium: Nuevo Los Cármenes; Attendance: 14,773; Referee: Jesús Gil Manzano |

| 14 December 2019 17 | Granada | 1–2 | Levante | Granada |
| 13:00 CET (UTC+1) | Gonalons (yellow card) 11'; Neva (yellow card) 52'; Machís 60'; Eteki (yellow card) 90+1'; Fernández (yellow card) 90+1' | Report | Postigo (yellow card) 2'; Rochina 55'; Bardhi (yellow card) 59', (goal) 90'; Cabaco (yellow card) 90+1' | Stadium: Nuevo Los Cármenes; Attendance: 14,127; Referee: Carlos del Cerro Grande |

| 20 December 2019 18 | Eibar | 3–0 | Granada | Eibar |
| 21:00 CET (UTC+1) | Enrich 21', (yellow card) 45'; Kike 26'; Escalante (yellow card) 55'; León (yellow card) 77'; Inui 87' | Report | Gonalons (yellow card) 17'; Duarte (yellow card) 56'; Eteki (yellow card) 80' | Stadium: Ipurua Municipal Stadium; Attendance: 5,350; Referee: Pablo González Fuertes |

| 5 January 2020 19 | Granada | 1–0 | Mallorca | Granada |
| 12:00 CET (UTC+1) | Montoro 24', (yellow card) 40'; Díaz (yellow card) 44'; Eteki (yellow card) 53'; Soldado (yellow card) 78'; Azeez (yellow card) 89' | Report | Raíllo (yellow card) 90+1' | Stadium: Nuevo Los Cármenes; Attendance: 16,395; Referee: César Soto Grado |

| 19 January 2020 20 | Barcelona | 1–0 | Granada | Barcelona |
| 21:00 CET (UTC+1) | Messi 76' | Report | Machís (yellow card) 12'; Sánchez (yellow card) 59' (yellow-red card) 69'; Fernández (yellow card) 72' | Stadium: Camp Nou; Attendance: 65,444; Referee: Valentín Pizarro Gómez |

| 25 January 2020 21 | Sevilla | 2–0 | Granada | Seville |
| 21:00 CET (UTC+1) | De Jong 11'; Vázquez (yellow card) 13'; Diego Carlos (yellow card) 14'; Fernando (yellow card) 25'; Nolito 34'; Gómez (yellow card) 82' | Report | Puertas (yellow card) 31' | Stadium: Ramón Sánchez Pizjuán; Attendance: 33,688; Referee: Alejandro Hernández Hernández |

| 1 February 2020 22 | Granada | 2–1 | Espanyol | Granada |
| 13:00 CET (UTC+1) | Soldado (yellow card) 29'; Machís 38'; Fernández 46'; Sánchez (yellow card) 48'; Gonalons (yellow card) 49' | Report | De Tomás 27' (pen.); Iturraspe (yellow card) 55'; Da. López (yellow card) 88'; Vilà (yellow card) 90+3' | Stadium: Nuevo Los Cármenes; Attendance: 15,226; Referee: Guillermo Cuadra Fernández |

| 8 February 2020 23 | Atlético Madrid | 1–0 | Granada | Madrid |
| 21:00 CET (UTC+1) | Correa 6'; Koke (yellow card) 28'; Thomas (yellow card) 68'; Vrsaljko (yellow card) 69'; Vitolo (yellow card) 86' | Report | Herrera (yellow card) 26'; Soldado (yellow card) 27'; Foulquier (yellow card) 36'; Duarte (yellow card) 84'; Díaz (yellow card) 88'; Köybaşı (yellow card) 90+1' | Stadium: Wanda Metropolitano; Attendance: 54,113; Referee: César Soto Grado |

| 15 February 2020 24 | Granada | 2–1 | Valladolid | Granada |
| 21:00 CET (UTC+1) | Foulquier (yellow card) 16'; Fernández (yellow card) 31', (goal) 90+6'; Puertas 81' | Report | Fede (yellow card) 11'; Plano (yellow card) 45'; Guardiola 56' | Stadium: Nuevo Los Cármenes; Attendance: 15,782; Referee: Juan Martínez Munuera |

| 23 February 2020 25 | Osasuna | 0–3 | Granada | Pamplona |
| 12:00 CET (UTC+1) | Vidal (yellow card) 57'; Ibáñez (yellow card) 59'; Mérida (yellow card) 78' | Report | Machís 4', 28'; Foulquier 41'; Herrera (yellow card) 55' | Stadium: El Sadar; Attendance: 14,905; Referee: José María Sánchez Martínez |

| 29 February 2020 26 | Granada | 0–0 | Celta Vigo | Granada |
| 21:00 CET (UTC+1) | Vico (yellow card) 42'; Herrera (yellow card) 54'; Soldado (yellow card) 79' | Report | Araujo (yellow card) 23'; Sisto (yellow card) 52'; Aspas (yellow card) 60'; Mallo (yellow card) 73'; Sergio (yellow card) 75' | Stadium: Nuevo Los Cármenes; Attendance: 15,906; Referee: Guillermo Cuadra Fernández |

| 8 March 2020 27 | Levante | 1–1 | Granada | Valencia |
| 16:00 CET (UTC+1) | Roger 11'; Morales (yellow card) 45+3'; Vukčević (yellow card) 69'; Campaña (yellow card) 90+3' | Report | Puertas (yellow card) 49'; Machís 60'; Duarte (yellow card) 82'; Eteki (yellow card) 90+1' | Stadium: Estadi Ciutat de València; Attendance: 16,168; Referee: Eduardo Prieto Iglesias |

| 12 June 2020 28 | Granada | 2–1 | Getafe | Granada |
| 19:30 CEST (UTC+2) | Díaz (yellow card) 10'; Fernández (yellow card) 16', (goal) 79'; Soldado (yellow card) 45+1'; Gonalons (yellow card) 49'; Herrera (yellow card) 68'; Djené 70' (o.g.); Germán (yellow card) 90' | Report | Timor 20'; Etxeita (yellow card) 23'; Etebo (yellow card) 61'; Duro (yellow card) 90'; Suárez (yellow card) 90' | Stadium: Nuevo Los Cármenes; Attendance: 0 Referee: David Medié Jiménez |
Note: The match was originally scheduled for 15 March, but was postponed due to the COVID-19 pandemic, and rescheduled to 12 June. It was played behind closed doors.

| 15 June 2020 29 | Real Betis | 2–2 | Granada | Seville |
| 22:00 CEST (UTC+2) | González (yellow card) 23'; Pedraza (yellow card) 65'; Canales 84' (pen.); Tello 88' | Report | Fernández 29'; Vallejo (yellow card) 41'; Germán (yellow card) 52'; Foulquier (yellow card) 67'; Soldado 90+1'; Silva (yellow card) 90+4' | Stadium: Benito Villamarín; Attendance: 0 Referee: César Soto Grado |
Note: The match was originally scheduled for 22 March, but was postponed due to the 2020 coronavirus pandemic, and rescheduled to 15 June. It was played behind closed doors.

| 19 June 2020 30 | Granada | 0–1 | Villarreal | Granada |
| 19:30 CEST (UTC+2) | | Report | Gerard 11'; Moreno (yellow card) 20'; Chukwueze (yellow card) 86'; Asenjo (yellow card) 90' | Stadium: Nuevo Los Cármenes; Attendance: 0 Referee: Guillermo Cuadra Fernández |
Note: The match was originally scheduled for 5 April, but was postponed due to the 2020 coronavirus pandemic, and rescheduled to 19 June. It was played behind closed doors.

| 22 June 2020 31 | Leganés | 0–0 | Granada | Leganés |
| 22:00 CEST (UTC+2) | Bustinza (yellow card) 13'; Silva (yellow card) 36'; Rodrigues (yellow card) 50'; Pérez (yellow card) 81' | Report | Antoñín (yellow card) 23'; Machís (yellow card) 45'; Neva (yellow card) 63'; Herrera (yellow card) 74' | Stadium: Estadio Municipal de Butarque; Attendance: 0 Referee: Ricardo de Burgos Bengoetxea |
Note: The match was originally scheduled for 12 April, but was postponed due to the 2020 coronavirus pandemic, and rescheduled to 22 June. It was played behind closed doors.

| 28 June 2020 32 | Granada | 1–2 | Eibar | Granada |
| 19:30 CEST (UTC+2) | Soldado 48'; Germán (yellow card) 90+4' | Report | De Blasis 16'; Kike 69' | Stadium: Nuevo Los Cármenes; Attendance: 0 Referee: Carlos del Cerro Grande |
Note: The match was originally scheduled for 22 April, but was postponed due to the 2020 coronavirus pandemic, and rescheduled to 28 June. It was played behind closed doors.

| 1 July 2020 33 | Alavés | 0–2 | Granada | Vitoria-Gasteiz |
| 19:30 CEST (UTC+2) | Duarte (yellow card) 46'; Aguirregabiria (yellow card) 90+1'; Pons (yellow card) 90+6' | Report | Antoñín 25', (yellow card) 37'; Soldado 49', (yellow card) 62' | Stadium: Mendizorrotza; Attendance: 0 Referee: Eduardo Prieto Iglesias |
Note: The match was originally scheduled for 26 April, but was postponed due to the 2020 coronavirus pandemic. and rescheduled to 1 July. It was played behind closed doors.

| 4 July 2020 34 | Granada | 2–2 | Valencia | Granada |
| 22:00 CEST (UTC+2) | Foulquier (yellow card) 45+1'; Fernández 61' (pen.); Vico 86'; Herrera (yellow card) 90+5' | Report | Vallejo 63'; Guedes 68', (yellow card) 90'; Wass (yellow card) 90+7' | Stadium: Nuevo Los Cármenes; Attendance: 0 Referee: Adrián Cordero Vega |
Note: The match was originally scheduled for 3 May, but was postponed due to the 2020 coronavirus pandemic, and rescheduled to 4 July. It was played behind closed doors.

| 10 July 2020 35 | Real Sociedad | 2–3 | Granada | San Sebastián |
| 19:30 CEST (UTC+2) | Muñoz (yellow card) 4'; Merino 47'; Elustondo (yellow card) 67'; Oyarzabal 83' | Report | Fernández (yellow card) 7'; Puertas 21', (yellow card) 88'; Soldado (yellow card) 39', (goal) 43'; Duarte 88' | Stadium: Anoeta; Attendance: 0 Referee: Juan Martínez Munuera |
Note: The match was originally scheduled for 10 May, but was postponed due to the 2020 coronavirus pandemic, and rescheduled to 10 July. It was played behind closed doors.

| 13 July 2020 36 | Granada | 1–2 | Real Madrid | Granada |
| 22:00 CEST (UTC+2) | Duarte (yellow card) 46'; Machís 50'; Dias (yellow card) 58' | Report | Mendy 10', (yellow card) 17'; Benzema 16'; Courtois (yellow card) 90+3' | Stadium: Nuevo Los Cármenes; Attendance: 0 Referee: Santiago Jaime Latre |
Note: The match was originally scheduled for 13 May, but was postponed due to the 2020 coronavirus pandemic, and rescheduled to 13 July. It was played behind closed doors.

| 16 July 2020 37 | Mallorca | 1–2 | Granada | Palma |
| 21:00 CEST (UTC+2) | Budimir (yellow card) 2'; Hernández 20', (yellow card) 84' (yellow-red card) 90+7'; Sevilla (yellow card) 28'; Baba (yellow card) 33'; Valjent (yellow card) 60'; Kubo (yellow card) 67'; Sedlar (red card) 80' | Report | Herrera (yellow card) 21'; Montoro (yellow card) 44'; Díaz 45+1'; Fernández 69'; Machís (yellow card) 86'; Puertas (yellow card) 90'; Silva (yellow card) 90+6' | Stadium: Estadi de Son Moix; Attendance: 0 Referee: Xavier Estrada Fernández |
Note: The match was originally scheduled for 17 May, but was postponed due to the 2020 coronavirus pandemic, and rescheduled to 16 July. It was played behind closed doors.

| 19 July 2020 38 | Granada | 4–0 | Athletic Bilbao | Granada |
| 21:00 CEST (UTC+2) | Herrera (yellow card) 6'; Soldado 29'; Puertas 55'; Fernández 67'; Montoro 90+3' | Report | D. García (yellow card) 17'; Berchiche (yellow card) 75' | Stadium: Nuevo Los Cármenes; Attendance: 0 Referee: Carlos del Cerro Grande |
Note: The match was originally scheduled for 24 May, but was postponed due to the 2020 coronavirus pandemic, and rescheduled to 19 July. It was played behind closed doors.

=== Copa del Rey ===
| 17 December 2019 First round | L'Hospitalet | 2–3 (a.e.t.) | Granada | L'Hospitalet de Llobregat |
| 19:00 CET (UTC+1) | Ripoll 12'; Martínez 44'; Parera (yellow card) 45+7' (yellow-red card) 50'; Ripoll (yellow card) 90'; Soler (yellow card) 90+6'; Ekedo (yellow card) 90+7'; Reina (yellow card) 98'; Gómez (yellow card) 120+3' | Report | Ramos 52' (pen.), 96'; Machís (yellow card) 58'; Soldado 79' | Stadium: La Feixa Llarga; Attendance: 2,000; Referee: Guillermo Cuadra Fernández |

| 11 January 2020 Second round | Tamaraceite | 0–1 | Granada | Las Palmas |
| 21:00 CET (UTC+1) | Casais (yellow card) 13'; Montesdeoca (yellow card) 88' | Report | Azeez (yellow card) 16'; Puertas 19'; Duarte (yellow card) 80'; Köybaşı (yellow card) 85' | Stadium: Juan Guedes; Attendance: 800; Referee: Ricardo de Burgos Bengoetxea |

| 22 January 2020 Round of 32 | Badalona | 1–3 (a.e.t.) | Granada | Badalona |
| 21:00 CET (UTC+1) | Simón (yellow card) 38'; Robusté 58', (yellow card) 105'; Pelon (yellow card) 68'; Montes (yellow card) 90+1'; Marcet (yellow card) 113'; Suárez (yellow card) 119' | Report | Köybaşı 2'; Fernández (yellow card) 32', (goal) 110'; Vadillo (yellow card) 43'; Herrera (yellow card) 54'; Puertas (yellow card) 74'; Gonalons 102'; J. Martínez (yellow card) 109' | Stadium: Municipal; Attendance: 3,200; Referee: Santiago Jaime Latre |

| 29 January 2020 Round of 16 | Badajoz | 2–3 (a.e.t.) | Granada | Badajoz |
| 21:00 CET (UTC+1) | Vázquez 8'; Fobi (yellow card) 49'; Caballero 90+3'; Van Kippersluis (yellow card) 98'; Candelas (yellow card) 100' | Report | Á. Martínez 1'; Eteki (yellow card) 20'; Gonalons (yellow card) 67'; Machís (yellow card) 79'; Soldado 86', (yellow card) 89'; Aarón (yellow card) 95'; Fernández 109' | Stadium: Nuevo Vivero; Attendance: 14,898; Referee: César Soto Grado |

| 4 February 2020 Quarter-finals | Granada | 2–1 | Valencia | Granada |
| 21:00 CET (UTC+1) | Soldado 3', 90+4' (pen.), (yellow card) 53'; Gonalons (yellow card) 43' | Report | Rodrigo 40' | Stadium: Nuevo Los Cármenes; Attendance: 16,551; Referee: José Luis González González |

| 12 February 2020 Semi-finals; First leg | Athletic Bilbao | 1–0 | Granada | Bilbao |
| 21:00 CET (UTC+1) | D. García (yellow card) 16'; Williams (yellow card) 29'; Muniain 42'; Aduriz (yellow card) 67' | Report | Díaz (yellow card) 29'; Soldado (yellow card) 65' | Stadium: San Mamés; Attendance: 48,149; Referee: Alejandro Hernández Hernández |

| 5 March 2020 Semi-finals; Second leg | Granada | 2–1 (2–2 (a) agg.) | Athletic Bilbao | Granada |
| 21:00 CET (UTC+1) | Fernández 48'; Germán (yellow card) 50', (goal) 76' | Report | Álvarez (yellow card) 40'; Vesga (yellow card) 73'; Berchiche 81'; Simón (yellow card) 90+3' | Stadium: Nuevo Los Cármenes; Attendance: 20,799; Referee: Carlos del Cerro Grande |

== Statistics ==
=== Squad statistics ===
Last updated on the end of the season

| No. | Pos | Nat | Player | Total | | La Liga | | Copa del Rey | |
| No. | Pos | Nat | Player | Apps | Goals | Apps | Goals | Apps | Goals |
Goalkeepers
| 1 | GK | (Portugal) POR | Rui Silva | 37 | 0 | 35 | 0 | 2 | 0 |
| 13 | GK | (Spain) ESP | Aarón Escandell | 8 | 0 | 3 | 0 | 5 | 0 |
Defenders
| 2 | DF | (Guadeloupe) GLP | Dimitri Foulquier | 22 | 1 | 12+5 | 1 | 5 | 0 |
| 3 | DF | (Spain) ESP | Álex Martínez | 5 | 1 | 0+1 | 0 | 4 | 1 |
| 5 | DF | (Spain) ESP | José Antonio Martínez | 23 | 0 | 13+7 | 0 | 3 | 0 |
| 6 | DF | (Spain) ESP | Germán Sánchez | 33 | 3 | 26+2 | 2 | 5 | 1 |
| 15 | DF | (Spain) ESP | Carlos Neva | 29 | 0 | 25+1 | 0 | 3 | 0 |
| 16 | DF | (Spain) ESP | Víctor Díaz | 40 | 1 | 33+3 | 1 | 2+2 | 0 |
| 20 | DF | (Spain) ESP | Jesús Vallejo | 14 | 0 | 7+4 | 0 | 3 | 0 |
| 22 | DF | (Portugal) POR | Domingos Duarte | 39 | 3 | 34+2 | 3 | 3 | 0 |
| 39 | DF | (Spain) ESP | Pepe | 1 | 0 | 0 | 0 | 1 | 0 |
| | DF | (Spain) ESP | Quini | 10 | 0 | 8+2 | 0 | 0 | 0 |
Midfielders
| 4 | MF | (France) FRA | Maxime Gonalons | 25 | 1 | 17+2 | 0 | 5+1 | 1 |
| 8 | MF | (Cameroon) CMR | Yan Eteki | 35 | 0 | 18+10 | 0 | 3+4 | 0 |
| 12 | MF | (Nigeria) NGR | Ramon Azeez | 29 | 2 | 14+11 | 2 | 3+1 | 0 |
| 17 | MF | (Portugal) POR | Gil Dias | 13 | 0 | 3+9 | 0 | 0+1 | 0 |
| 19 | MF | (Spain) ESP | Ángel Montoro | 15 | 2 | 11+4 | 2 | 0 | 0 |
| 21 | MF | (Venezuela) VEN | Yangel Herrera | 36 | 2 | 28+2 | 2 | 5+1 | 0 |
| 26 | MF | (Spain) ESP | Antonio Aranda | 1 | 0 | 0 | 0 | 1 | 0 |
| 29 | MF | (Spain) ESP | Isma | 1 | 0 | 0 | 0 | 1 | 0 |
| 31 | MF | (Spain) ESP | Mario Rodríguez | 2 | 0 | 0+1 | 0 | 1 | 0 |
Forwards
| 9 | FW | (Spain) ESP | Roberto Soldado | 39 | 11 | 30+3 | 7 | 4+2 | 4 |
| 10 | FW | (Spain) ESP | Antonio Puertas | 43 | 8 | 27+9 | 7 | 5+2 | 1 |
| 14 | FW | (Spain) ESP | Fede Vico | 19 | 2 | 11+7 | 2 | 0+1 | 0 |
| 18 | FW | (Spain) ESP | Antoñín | 9 | 1 | 2+6 | 1 | 0+1 | 0 |
| 23 | FW | (Venezuela) VEN | Darwin Machís | 42 | 7 | 20+16 | 7 | 3+3 | 0 |
| 24 | FW | (Spain) ESP | Carlos Fernández | 40 | 13 | 21+13 | 10 | 5+1 | 3 |
Players who have made an appearance this season but have left the club
| 2 | DF | (Spain) ESP | Bernardo | 0 | 0 | 0 | 0 | 0 | 0 |
| 7 | FW | (Spain) ESP | Álvaro Vadillo | 26 | 3 | 15+7 | 3 | 4 | 0 |
| 11 | DF | (Turkey) TUR | İsmail Köybaşı | 7 | 1 | 3+1 | 0 | 1+2 | 1 |
| 20 | FW | (Colombia) COL | Adrián Ramos | 8 | 2 | 2+5 | 0 | 1 | 2 |

=== Goalscorers ===
As of matches played until 13 July 2020

| Rank | No. | Pos. | Player | La Liga | Copa del Rey | Total |
|---|---|---|---|---|---|---|
| 1 | 24 | FW | (Spain) Carlos Fernández | 8 | 3 | 11 |
| 2 | 9 | FW | (Spain) Roberto Soldado | 6 | 4 | 10 |
| 3 | 23 | FW | (Venezuela) Darwin Machís | 8 | 0 | 8 |
| 4 | 10 | FW | (Spain) Antonio Puertas | 6 | 1 | 7 |
| 5 | 7 | MF | (Spain) Álvaro Vadillo | 3 | 0 | 3 |
| 5 | 6 | DF | (Spain) Germán Sánchez | 2 | 1 | 3 |
| 5 | 22 | DF | (Portugal) Domingos Duarte | 3 | 0 | 3 |
| 8 | 12 | MF | (Nigeria) Ramon Azeez | 2 | 0 | 2 |
| 8 | 14 | MF | (Spain) Fede Vico | 2 | 0 | 2 |
| 8 | 21 | MF | (Venezuela) Yangel Herrera | 2 | 0 | 2 |
| 8 | 20 | FW | (Colombia) Adrián Ramos | 0 | 2 | 2 |
| 8 | 2 | DF | (France) Dimitri Foulquier | 2 | 0 | 2 |
| 13 | 4 | MF | (France) Maxime Gonalons | 0 | 1 | 1 |
| 13 | 11 | DF | (Turkey) İsmail Köybaşı | 0 | 1 | 1 |
| 13 | 3 | DF | (Spain) Álex Martínez | 0 | 1 | 1 |
| 13 | 18 | FW | (Spain) Antoñín | 1 | 0 | 1 |
| 13 | 19 | MF | (Spain) Ángel Montoro | 1 | 0 | 1 |
| TOTAL | | | | 46 | 14 | 60 |
