= Ramon Azeez =

Nigerian footballer (born 1992)

Personal information
- Full name: Ramon Olamilekan Azeez
- Date of birth: 12 December 1992 (age 33)
- Place of birth: Abuja, Nigeria
- Height: 1.70 m (5 ft 7 in)
- Position: Midfielder

Youth career
- Future Pro Academy

Senior career*
Years	Team	Apps	(Gls)
2011–2016	Almería B	78	(7)
2012–2017	Almería	71	(4)
2017–2019	Lugo	49	(2)
2019–2021	Granada	40	(2)
2021	→ Cartagena (loan)	16	(0)
2025	Novelda	0	(0)

International career
2009	Nigeria U17	7	(1)
2011–2012	Nigeria U20	9	(1)
2014–2019	Nigeria	6	(0)
- * Club domestic league appearances and goals as of 31 May 2021

Ramon Olamilekan Azeez (born 12 December 1992) is a Nigerian footballer who played as a central midfielder.

He spent the vast majority of his professional career in Spain, starting at Almería B. In La Liga, he appeared for the first team of that club and Granada.

An international since 2014, Azeez represented Nigeria at the 2014 World Cup.

== Club career ==
=== Almería ===
Born in Abuja, Azeez began playing football in the Future Pro Academy. In 2010 he agreed a move to UD Almería in Spain, but had to wait until July 2011 to complete the transfer.

On 17 August 2012, after one full season with the reserves in the Segunda División B, Azeez made his debut with the first team: he came on as a substitute for Javier Casquero in the 55th minute of an away fixture against FC Barcelona Atlètic in the Segunda División (5–4 win), but was himself replaced after just ten minutes after being booked and, according to manager Javi Gracia, risking a subsequent sending off.

Azeez was definitely promoted to the Andalusians' main squad on 28 June 2013, with the club having just promoted to La Liga. He made his debut in the competition on 30 August, playing 23 minutes of the 2–2 home draw with Elche CF.

On 21 December 2013, Azeez scored his first professional goal, the game's only in a win at Real Betis. He repeated the feat in the second meeting between the two sides, scoring in the 94th minute for a 3–2 victory at the Estadio de los Juegos Mediterráneos.

Azeez featured sparingly during the 2014–15 campaign, as Almería suffered relegation. In June 2015 he requested a transfer, and after failing to sign a professional contract he was demoted back to the reserves in August.

On 26 January 2016, Azeez returned to the main squad, seriously threatened with relegation, after agreeing to a professional deal.

=== Lugo and Granada ===
On 13 July 2017, free agent Azeez signed with CD Lugo also of the Spanish second tier. On 1 February 2019, he joined Granada CF of the same league on a three-and-a-half-year contract.

On 21 September 2019, Azeez headed home from close range following an Antonio Puertas cross, in the first minute of a 2–0 home win over defending champions FC Barcelona. In February 2021, he was loaned to FC Cartagena until the end of the second-division season.

== International career ==
Azeez appeared with the Nigeria under-17's at the 2009 FIFA World Cup, and was a regular in a team that finished runners-up. Two years later, also as a starter, he participated in the U-20 World Cup.

On 3 February 2014, Azeez was called up to the full side for a friendly with Mexico. He made his debut on 5 March, playing the second half of the 0–0 draw at Georgia Dome.

Azeez was named in the provisional 30-man squad ahead of the 2014 FIFA World Cup on 6 May. He was included in Stephen Keshi's final list for the tournament, and made his debut on 16 June by starting in a 0–0 draw against Iran.

In September 2019, Azeez was recalled to the national team after five years.

== Career statistics ==
=== Club ===
As of match played 18 May 2021

Appearances and goals by club, season and competition
Club	Season	League			National Cup		Other		Total	
Club	Season	Division	Apps	Goals	Apps	Goals	Apps	Goals	Apps	Goals
Almería B	2011–12	Segunda División B	28	2	—		—		28	2
Almería B	2012–13	Segunda División B	31	3	—		—		31	3
Almería B	2015–16	Segunda División B	19	2	—		—		19	2
Almería B	Total		78	7	0	0	0	0	0	0
Almería	2012–13	Segunda División	2	0	2	0	—		4	0
Almería	2013–14	La Liga	30	2	2	0	—		32	2
Almería	2014–15	La Liga	14	0	3	0	—		17	0
Almería	2015–16	Segunda División	3	0	0	0	—		3	0
Almería	2016–17	Segunda División	22	2	0	0	—		22	2
Almería	Total		71	4	7	0	0	0	78	4
Lugo	2017–18	Segunda División	37	2	2	0	—		39	2
Lugo	2018–19	Segunda División	12	0	3	0	—		15	0
Lugo	Total		49	2	5	0	0	0	54	2
Granada	2018–19	Segunda División	13	0	0	0	—		13	0
Granada	2019–20	La Liga	25	2	4	0	—		29	2
Granada	2020–21	La Liga	2	0	2	0	—		4	0
Granada	2021–22	La Liga	0	0	0	0	—		0	0
Granada	Total		40	2	6	0	0	0	46	2
Cartagena (loan)	2020–21	Segunda División	16	0	0	0	—		16	0
Career total			254	15	18	0	0	0	272	15

=== International ===
Nigeria
Year	Apps	Goals
2014	4	0
2019	1	0
Total	5	0

== Honours ==
Nigeria U20

- U-20 Africa Cup of Nations: 2011

Nigeria U17

- FIFA U-17 World Cup runner-up: 2009

Individual

- FIFA U-17 World Cup Bronze Ball: 2009
