= Carlos Fernández (footballer, born 1996) =

Spanish footballer

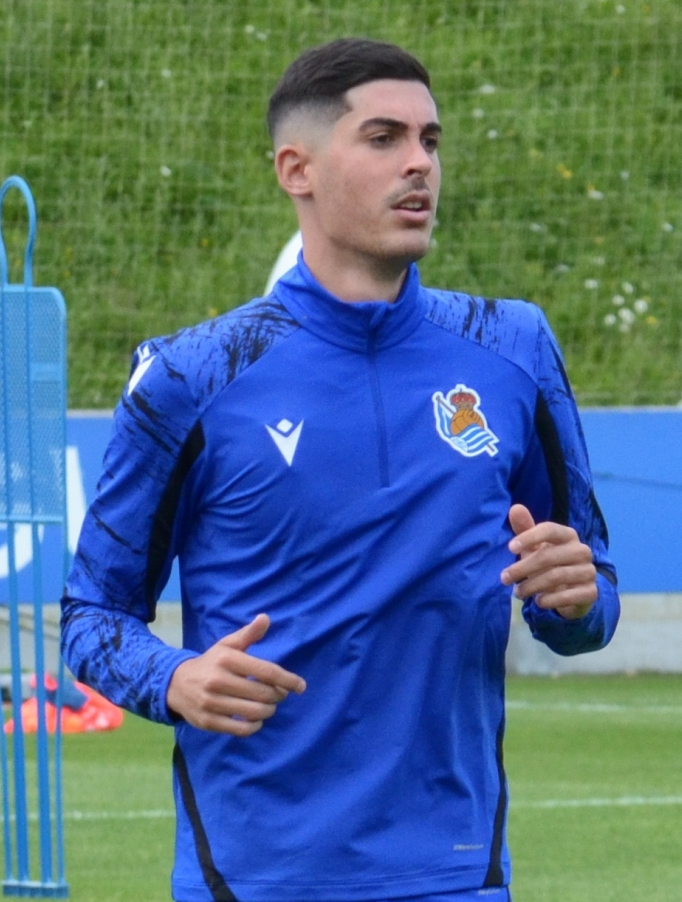
- Fernández training with Real Sociedad in 2021

Personal information
- Full name: Carlos Fernández Luna
- Date of birth: 22 May 1996 (age 30)
- Place of birth: Castilleja de Guzmán, Spain
- Height: 1.86 m (6 ft 1 in)
- Position: Forward

Team information
- Current team: Oviedo

Youth career
- Sevilla

Senior career*
Years	Team	Apps	(Gls)
2013–2018	Sevilla B	120	(37)
2013–2021	Sevilla	16	(2)
2018–2019	→ Deportivo La Coruña (loan)	24	(8)
2019–2020	→ Granada (loan)	34	(10)
2021–2026	Real Sociedad	45	(4)
2024–2025	→ Cádiz (loan)	32	(1)
2025–2026	→ Mirandés (loan)	35	(16)
2026–	Oviedo	0	(0)

International career
2012	Spain U16	1	(0)
2013–2015	Spain U19	18	(1)
2018	Spain U21	3	(0)
- * Club domestic league appearances and goals as of 00:28, 9 June 2026 (UTC)

Carlos Fernández Luna (born 22 May 1996) is a Spanish professional footballer who plays as a forward for Segunda División club Real Oviedo.

== Club career ==
=== Sevilla ===
Born in Castilleja de Guzmán, Province of Seville, Andalusia, Fernández started playing senior football with Sevilla FC's reserve team at only 17, competing in the Segunda División B. On 18 December 2013, he made his official debut with the main squad, coming on as a substitute for Piotr Trochowski in a 0–2 home loss against Racing de Santander in the round of 32 of the Copa del Rey.

On 2 March 2014, still before his 18th birthday, Fernández first appeared in La Liga, replacing fellow youth graduate José Antonio Reyes midway through the second half of an eventual 1–0 victory over Real Sociedad also at the Ramón Sánchez-Pizjuán Stadium. He scored a career-best 17 goals for the B side during the 2015–16 campaign, helping in their promotion to Segunda División.

Fernández scored his first professional goal on 21 August 2016, in the reserves' 3–3 home draw with Girona FC. Three weeks later, he netted for the first time in the top flight with the first team, scoring the second of two late goals in a 2–1 home defeat of UD Las Palmas.

During a training session in early October 2016, Fernández partially ruptured the anterior cruciate ligament to his left knee, going on to miss the rest of the season. He returned to training the following April, and continued to appear mostly for the reserves.

On 30 August 2018, Fernández was loaned to second-division club Deportivo de La Coruña for one year. On 14 August of the following year, he moved to Granada CF of the top tier also in a temporary deal, scoring ten goals to help them to finish seventh and qualify for the UEFA Europa League for the first time in their history.

=== Real Sociedad ===
On 24 January 2021, after being deemed surplus to requirements by manager Julen Lopetegui, Fernández signed a 6 1/2-year contract with Real Sociedad, with his former club receiving a transfer fee of a reported €10 million plus another two in variables. He scored his first goal on 18 April, opening an eventual 1–2 home loss to precisely Sevilla.

Fernández missed the entire 2021–22 season, due to another serious knee injury. On 30 August 2024, he was loaned to Cádiz CF in the second division.

On 19 August 2025, also on loan, Fernández joined CD Mirandés of the same league. He scored 16 goals during his spell, being however unable to prevent relegation.

=== Oviedo ===
On 25 July 2026, Fernández signed a two-year contract with Real Oviedo.

== International career ==
Fernández was part of the Spain squad that won the 2015 UEFA European Under-19 Championship in Greece. He won his first cap for the under-21 side on 22 March 2018, as a late replacement in a 5–3 away victory over Northern Ireland for the 2019 European Championship qualifiers.

== Career statistics ==
As of 24 May 2026

Appearances and goals by club, season and competition
Club	Season	League			Cup		Continental		Other		Total	
Club	Season	Division	Apps	Goals	Apps	Goals	Apps	Goals	Apps	Goals	Apps	Goals
Sevilla Atlético	2013–14	Segunda División B	28	8	—		—		0	0	28	8
Sevilla Atlético	2014–15	Segunda División B	32	5	—		—		0	0	32	5
Sevilla Atlético	2015–16	Segunda División B	32	15	—		—		6 (Note: Appearances in Segunda División B play-offs)	2	38	17
Sevilla Atlético	2016–17	Segunda División	4	1	—		—		0	0	4	1
Sevilla Atlético	2017–18	Segunda División	24	8	—		—		0	0	24	8
Sevilla Atlético	Total		120	37	0	0	0	0	6	2	126	39
Sevilla	2013–14	La Liga	4	0	1	0	0	0	—		5	0
Sevilla	2014–15	La Liga	1	0	0	0	0	0	0	0	1	0
Sevilla	2015–16	La Liga	1	0	0	0	0	0	0	0	1	0
Sevilla	2016–17	La Liga	3	1	0	0	0	0	0	0	3	1
Sevilla	2017–18	La Liga	2	1	0	0	0	0	—		2	1
Sevilla	2020–21	La Liga	5	0	1	0	1 (Note: Appearances in UEFA Champions League)	0	0	0	7	0
Sevilla	Total		16	2	2	0	1	0	0	0	19	2
Deportivo La Coruña (loan)	2018–19	Segunda División	24	8	1	0	0	0	4 (Note: Appearances in La Liga play-offs)	2	29	10
Granada (loan)	2019–20	La Liga	34	10	6	3	0	0	0	0	40	13
Real Sociedad	2019–20	La Liga	—		1 (Note: Includes appearance in 2020 Copa del Rey final (played in 2021))	0	—		—		1	0
Real Sociedad	2020–21	La Liga	11	1	1	0	0	0	0	0	12	1
Real Sociedad	2022–23	La Liga	24	1	2	0	4 (Note: Appearances in UEFA Europa League)	0	—		30	1
Real Sociedad	2023–24	La Liga	10	2	2	1	4	0	—		16	3
Real Sociedad	2024–25	La Liga	0	0	0	0	0	0	—		0	0
Real Sociedad	2026–27	La Liga	0	0	0	0	0	0	—		0	0
Real Sociedad	Total		45	4	6	1	8	0	0	0	59	5
Cádiz (loan)	2024–25	Segunda División	32	1	0	0	—		—		32	1
Mirandés (loan)	2025–26	Segunda División	35	16	0	0	—		—		35	16
Career total			306	78	15	4	9	0	10	4	340	86

== Honours ==
Real Sociedad

- Copa del Rey: 2019–20

Spain U19

- UEFA European Under-19 Championship: 2015
