= Antonio Puertas =

Spanish footballer

Personal information
- Full name: Antonio José Rodríguez Díaz
- Date of birth: 21 February 1992 (age 34)
- Place of birth: Benahadux, Spain
- Height: 1.75 m (5 ft 9 in)
- Position: Forward

Team information
- Current team: Albacete
- Number: 7

Youth career
- Los Molinos
- 2009–2010: Villarreal
- 2010–2011: Almería

Senior career*
| Years | Team | Apps | (Gls) |
| 2011–2012 | Poli Ejido | 10 | (1) |
| 2012–2014 | Granada B | 60 | (24) |
| 2014–2015 | Almería B | 37 | (7) |
| 2015–2017 | Almería | 50 | (8) |
| 2017–2024 | Granada | 223 | (30) |
| 2024–2025 | Eibar | 41 | (5) |
| 2025– | Albacete | 29 | (8) |
- * Club domestic league appearances and goals as of 9 June 2026

Antonio José Rodríguez Díaz (born 21 February 1992), known as Antonio Puertas, is a Spanish footballer who plays as a forward for Albacete Balompié.

== Club career ==
=== Early career ===
Born in Benahadux, Almería, Andalusia, Puertas finished his formation with UD Almería, after representing Los Molinos CF and Villarreal CF. He made his senior debuts with Polideportivo Ejido in 2011, in Segunda División B.

On 31 January 2012, Puertas moved to Granada CF, being assigned to the reserves after Poli Ejido's dissolution. After scoring ten goals in 2013–14, he moved to another reserve team, UD Almería B, also in the third level.

=== Almería ===
On 14 June 2015, Puertas was promoted to the Rojiblancos' main squad in the Segunda División. He made his professional debut on 9 September, coming on as a second-half substitute for José Ángel Pozo in a 3–3 Copa del Rey home draw against Elche CF (4–3 win on penalties).

Puertas made his debut in the second level on 11 October 2015, starting in a 1–1 away draw against Girona FC. He only scored his first professional goal on 3 September of the following year, netting the first in a 3–0 home win against Rayo Vallecano; he added another the following weekend, in a 3–3 draw at Girona.

=== Granada ===
On 16 June 2017, Puertas returned to Granada, signing a three-year contract and being assigned to the main squad, also in the second tier. He scored a career-best ten goals during the 2018–19 campaign as his side achieved promotion to La Liga.

Puertas made his debut in the top tier on 17 August 2019, starting and scoring his team's fourth in a 4–4 away draw against Villarreal CF. He was regularly used in the following years, but lost his starting spot in the 2023–24 season, having only six league starts as the club suffered relegation.

=== Eibar ===
On 23 July 2024, free agent Puertas agreed to a two-year deal with SD Eibar in the second division.

=== Albacete ===
On 1 July 2025, Puertas moved to fellow division two side Albacete Balompié on a two-year contract.

== Career statistics ==
=== Club ===
As of match played 23 May 2021

Appearances and goals by club, season and competition
| Club | Season | League | | | National Cup | | Continental | | Other | | Total | |
| Club | Season | Division | Apps | Goals | Apps | Goals | Apps | Goals | Apps | Goals | Apps | Goals |
|---|---|---|---|---|---|---|---|---|---|---|---|---|
| Poli Ejido | 2011–12 | Segunda División B | 10 | 1 | — | | — | | — | | 10 | 1 |
| Granada B | 2011–12 | Primera Andaluza | 1 | 1 | — | | — | | — | | 1 | 1 |
| Granada B | 2012–13 | Tercera División | 36 | 13 | — | | — | | — | | 36 | 13 |
| Granada B | 2013–14 | Segunda División B | 23 | 10 | — | | — | | — | | 23 | 10 |
| Granada B | Total | | 60 | 24 | 0 | 0 | 0 | 0 | 0 | 0 | 60 | 24 |
| Almería B | 2014–15 | Segunda División B | 37 | 7 | — | | — | | 2 (Note: Appearance(s) in Promotion Playoffs) | 1 | 39 | 8 |
| Almería | 2015–16 | Segunda División | 11 | 0 | 3 | 0 | — | | — | | 14 | 0 |
| Almería | 2016–17 | Segunda División | 39 | 8 | 0 | 0 | — | | — | | 39 | 8 |
| Almería | Total | | 50 | 8 | 3 | 0 | 0 | 0 | 0 | 0 | 53 | 8 |
| Granada | 2017–18 | Segunda División | 19 | 0 | 1 | 0 | — | | — | | 20 | 0 |
| Granada | 2018–19 | Segunda División | 38 | 10 | 1 | 0 | — | | — | | 39 | 10 |
| Granada | 2019–20 | La Liga | 36 | 7 | 7 | 1 | — | | — | | 43 | 8 |
| Granada | 2020–21 | La Liga | 35 | 3 | 4 | 0 | 14 (Note: Appearance(s) in UEFA Europa League) | 1 | — | | 53 | 4 |
| Granada | 2021–22 | La Liga | 0 | 0 | 0 | 0 | — | | — | | 0 | 0 |
| Granada | Total | | 128 | 20 | 13 | 1 | 14 | 1 | 0 | 0 | 155 | 22 |
| Career total | | | 285 | 60 | 16 | 1 | 14 | 1 | 2 | 1 | 317 | 63 |

== Honours ==
Granada

- Segunda División: 2022–23
