= Álvaro Vadillo =

Spanish footballer

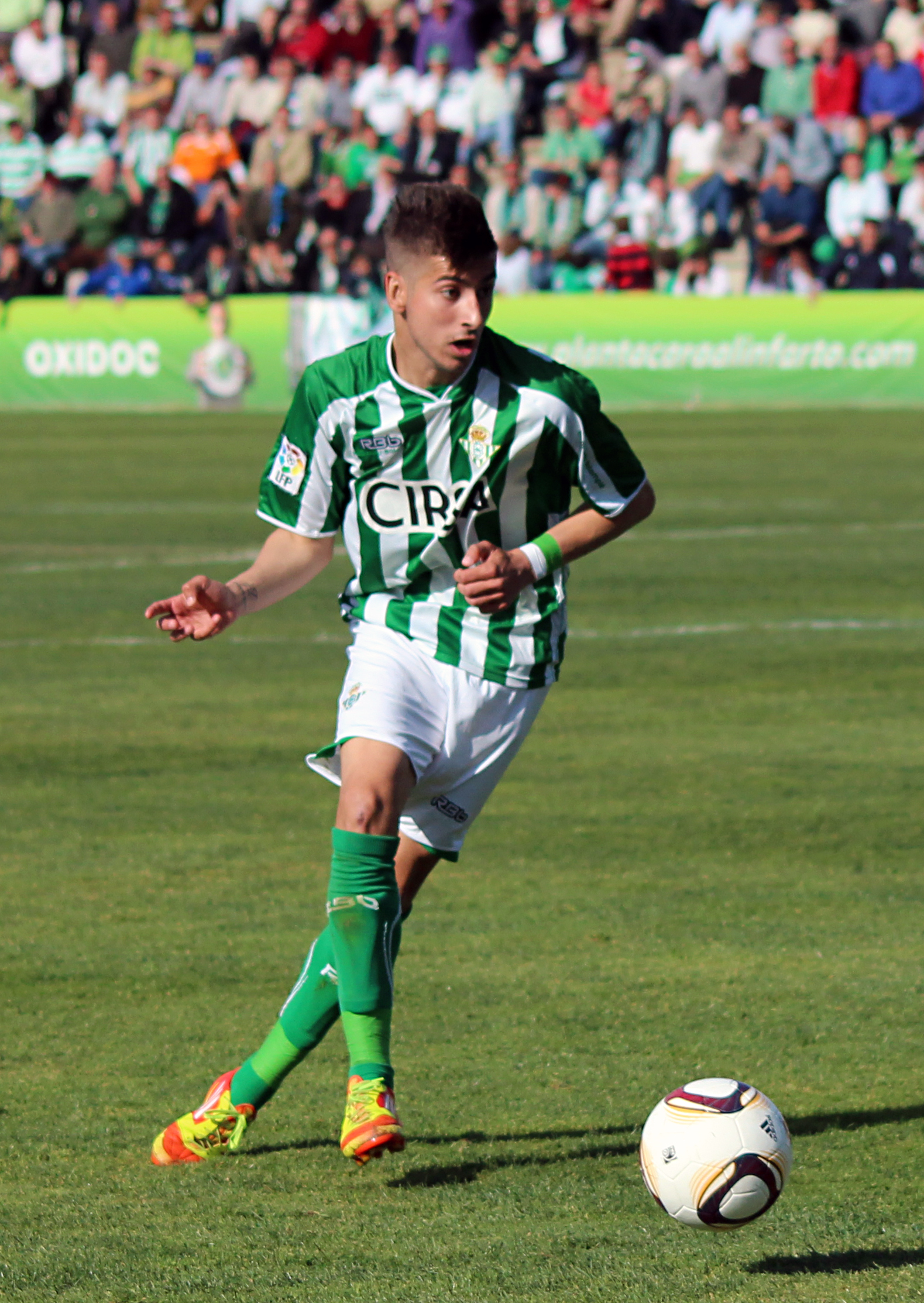
- Vadillo playing with Betis in 2012

Personal information
- Full name: Álvaro Vadillo Cifuentes
- Date of birth: 12 September 1994 (age 32)
- Place of birth: Puerto Real, Spain
- Height: 1.80 m (5 ft 11 in)
- Position: Winger

Youth career
- 2006–2011: Betis

Senior career*
Years	Team	Apps	(Gls)
2011–2013	Betis B	34	(4)
2011–2016	Betis	49	(0)
2016–2018	Huesca	53	(7)
2018–2020	Granada	62	(7)
2020–2021	Celta	0	(0)
2020–2021	→ Espanyol (loan)	12	(0)
2021–2023	Espanyol	3	(0)
2022	→ Málaga (loan)	17	(3)
2022–2023	→ Eibar (loan)	22	(0)
2023–2024	Racing Ferrol	8	(1)

International career
2010–2011	Spain U17	7	(0)
2013	Spain U19	7	(1)
2012	Spain U20	5	(1)
- * Club domestic league appearances and goals as of 23:57, 20 June 2024 (UTC)

Álvaro Vadillo Cifuentes (born 12 September 1994) is a Spanish professional footballer who plays as a winger.

== Club career ==
=== Betis ===
Vadillo was born in Puerto Real, Province of Cádiz, and joined Real Betis' youth system at the age of 12. On 28 August 2011, he became the second youngest ever player to appear in a La Liga game, as he started in a 1–0 away win against Granada CF at the age of 16 years, 11 months and 16 days. The previous season, he played 14 matches (one goal) as the B team narrowly avoided relegation from Segunda División B.

On 15 October 2011, Vadillo collided with Sergio Ramos in the early minutes of an eventual 4–1 loss at Real Madrid, being stretchered off and missing several months with a torn cruciate ligament. On 1 August 2014 he suffered the same injury, being sidelined for six months.

=== Huesca ===
On 18 August 2016, free agent Vadillo signed a one-year contract with Segunda División club SD Huesca. He scored his first goal for them on 1 October, closing the 2–0 home victory over UD Almería.

Vadillo scored a brace in a 2–0 away defeat of Córdoba CF on 12 February 2017. He finished his first season with seven goals from 34 appearances, and achieved promotion to the first division in the second.

=== Granada ===
On 27 June 2018, Vadillo signed a two-year deal with Granada CF still in the second division. He won another promotion in his first year, contributing four goals to the feat.

Vadillo scored his first goal in the Spanish top flight on 21 September 2019, his team's second of the match through a penalty to ensure a 2–0 home win against defending champions FC Barcelona and a provisional top position in the standings.

=== Celta ===
On 22 July 2020, free agent Vadillo agreed to a three-year deal with RC Celta de Vigo also in the top tier. He did not take part in any games during his spell at the Balaídos.

=== Espanyol ===
On 5 October 2020, Vadillo was loaned to RCD Espanyol of the second division for one year. On 2 June of the following year, after their promotion, he signed a permanent contract after his buyout clause was met.

On 5 January 2022, after only six league minutes in three matches, Vadillo was loaned to Málaga CF until the end of the second-tier season. On 22 July, he joined SD Eibar of the same league also on loan.

Vadillo terminated his contract with Espanyol on 9 August 2023.

=== Racing Ferrol ===
On 1 September 2023, Vadillo joined Racing de Ferrol, newly-promoted to the second division.

== Career statistics ==
As of match played 30 May 2021

Appearances and goals by club, season and competition
Club	Season	League			National Cup		Continental		Other		Total	
Club	Season	Division	Apps	Goals	Apps	Goals	Apps	Goals	Apps	Goals	Apps	Goals
Betis B	2010–11	Segunda División B	14	1	—		—		1 (Note: Appearance in Segunda División B play-offs)	0	15	1
Betis B	2011–12	Segunda División B	10	1	—		—		—		10	1
Betis B	2012–13	Segunda División B	10	2	—		—		—		10	2
Betis B	Total		34	4	0	0	0	0	1	0	35	4
Betis	2011–12	La Liga	4	0	0	0	—		—		4	0
Betis	2012–13	La Liga	14	0	3	0	—		—		17	0
Betis	2013–14	La Liga	21	0	1	0	5 (Note: Appearances in UEFA Europa League)	1	—		27	1
Betis	2014–15	Segunda División	7	0	0	0	—		—		7	0
Betis	2015–16	La Liga	3	0	2	1	—		—		5	1
Betis	Total		49	0	6	1	5	1	0	0	60	2
Huesca	2016–17	Segunda División	32	7	1	0	—		2 (Note: Appearances in La Liga play-offs)	0	35	7
Huesca	2017–18	Segunda División	21	0	1	0	—		—		22	0
Huesca	Total		53	7	2	0	0	0	2	0	57	7
Granada	2018–19	Segunda División	40	4	0	0	—		—		40	4
Granada	2019–20	La Liga	22	3	4	0	—		—		26	3
Granada	Total		62	7	4	0	0	0	0	0	66	7
Celta	2020–21	La Liga	0	0	0	0	—		—		0	0
Espanyol (loan)	2020–21	Segunda División	12	0	2	0	—		—		14	0
Career total			210	18	14	1	5	1	3	0	232	20

== Honours ==
Betis

- Segunda División: 2014–15

Espanyol

- Segunda División: 2020–21
