= Ximo Navarro (footballer, born 1990) =

Spanish footballer

Personal information
- Full name: Joaquín Navarro Jiménez
- Date of birth: 23 January 1990 (age 36)
- Place of birth: Guadahortuna, Spain
- Height: 1.76 m (5 ft 9 in)
- Position: Right-back

Team information
- Current team: Deportivo A Coruña
- Number: 23

Youth career
- Mallorca

Senior career*
| Years | Team | Apps | (Gls) |
| 2009–2011 | Mallorca B | 58 | (1) |
| 2011–2014 | Mallorca | 54 | (0) |
| 2011–2012 | → Recreativo (loan) | 12 | (0) |
| 2012 | → Córdoba (loan) | 17 | (0) |
| 2014–2017 | Almería | 89 | (3) |
| 2017–2018 | Las Palmas | 31 | (0) |
| 2018–2022 | Alavés | 103 | (3) |
| 2022–2023 | Fortuna Sittard | 15 | (0) |
| 2023– | Deportivo A Coruña | 77 | (4) |
- * Club domestic league appearances and goals as of 08:26, 24 June 2026 (UTC)

Joaquín 'Ximo' Navarro Jiménez (born 23 January 1990) is a Spanish professional footballer who plays as a right-back for La Liga club Deportivo de A Coruña.

== Club career ==
Born in Guadahortuna, Province of Granada, Andalusia, Navarro graduated from local RCD Mallorca's youth system in 2009. He made his senior debut with the reserve team in the Segunda División B, starting in all games but one over the course of two seasons and being relegated in his second.

In summer 2011, Navarro was loaned to Recreativo de Huelva of Segunda División. He made his official debut on 27 August, in a 1–0 away loss against Deportivo de La Coruña. In January 2012, he signed with second-tier club Córdoba CF also on loan.

Navarro returned to the Balearic Islands for 2012–13. He made his La Liga debut on 18 August 2012, starting the 2–1 home win over RCD Espanyol, and contributed 16 league appearances as the campaign ended in relegation.

Navarro was an undisputed starter the following season with Mallorca, who narrowly avoided another drop. He returned to the top flight on 12 June 2014, joining UD Almería on a three-year contract.

On 17 June 2017, Navarro agreed to a three-year deal with top-flight side UD Las Palmas on a free transfer. On 5 July of the following year, he moved to Deportivo Alavés of the same league on a three-year contract.

After 104 competitive matches at the Mendizorrotza Stadium, Navarro left in June 2022 after his contract expired. On 14 September, he signed with Dutch club Fortuna Sittard, managed by his compatriot Julio Velázquez. He made his debut in the Eredivisie on 2 October, playing the entire 2–0 victory over FC Volendam.

On 1 August 2023, Navarro joined Deportivo La Coruña.

== Career statistics ==
As of match played 7 May 2023

Appearances and goals by club, season and competition
| Club | Season | League | | | National cup (Note: Includes Copa del Rey, KNVB Cup) | | Other | | Total | |
| Club | Season | Division | Apps | Goals | Apps | Goals | Apps | Goals | Apps | Goals |
|---|---|---|---|---|---|---|---|---|---|---|
| Mallorca B | 2009–10 | Segunda División B | 30 | 1 | — | | — | | 30 | 1 |
| Mallorca B | 2010–11 | Segunda División B | 28 | 0 | — | | — | | 28 | 0 |
| Mallorca B | Total | | 58 | 1 | — | | — | | 58 | 1 |
| Mallorca | 2012–13 | La Liga | 16 | 0 | 3 | 0 | — | | 19 | 0 |
| Mallorca | 2013–14 | Segunda División | 38 | 0 | 1 | 0 | — | | 39 | 0 |
| Mallorca | Total | | 54 | 0 | 4 | 0 | — | | 58 | 0 |
| Recreativo (loan) | 2011–12 | Segunda División | 12 | 0 | 0 | 0 | — | | 12 | 0 |
| Córdoba (loan) | 2011–12 | Segunda División | 17 | 0 | 0 | 0 | 2 (Note: Appearances in La Liga play-offs) | 0 | 19 | 0 |
| Almería | 2014–15 | La Liga | 28 | 0 | 1 | 0 | — | | 29 | 0 |
| Almería | 2015–16 | Segunda División | 24 | 1 | 1 | 0 | — | | 26 | 1 |
| Almería | 2016–17 | Segunda División | 37 | 2 | 1 | 0 | — | | 38 | 2 |
| Almería | Total | | 89 | 3 | 3 | 0 | — | | 93 | 3 |
| Las Palmas | 2017–18 | La Liga | 31 | 0 | 2 | 0 | — | | 33 | 0 |
| Alavés | 2018–19 | La Liga | 31 | 2 | 0 | 0 | — | | 31 | 2 |
| Alavés | 2019–20 | La Liga | 23 | 0 | 0 | 0 | — | | 23 | 0 |
| Alavés | 2020–21 | La Liga | 31 | 1 | 1 | 0 | — | | 20 | 1 |
| Alavés | 2021–22 | La Liga | 18 | 0 | 0 | 0 | — | | 18 | 0 |
| Alavés | Total | | 103 | 3 | 1 | 0 | — | | 104 | 3 |
| Fortuna Sittard | 2022–23 | Eredivisie | 15 | 0 | 1 | 0 | — | | 16 | 0 |
| Career totals | | | 379 | 7 | 11 | 0 | 2 | 0 | 392 | 7 |

== Honours ==
Deportivo La Coruña

- Primera Federación: 2023–24
