= Carlos Selfa =

Spanish footballer

Personal information
- Full name: Carlos Selfa Sanfélix
- Date of birth: 25 April 1992 (age 34)
- Place of birth: Sueca, Spain
- Height: 1.82 m (5 ft 11 1/2 in)
- Position: Midfielder

Team information
- Current team: Mérida
- Number: 16

Youth career
- 2007–2011: Levante

Senior career*
Years	Team	Apps	(Gls)
2010–2013	Levante B	89	(0)
2013–2014	Osasuna B	12	(0)
2014–2016	Almería B	67	(0)
2014–2017	Almería	1	(0)
2016–2017	→ Linense (loan)	25	(0)
2017–2018	Peña Deportiva	28	(1)
2018–2019	CF Villanovense	8	(1)
2019	Ebro	13	(1)
2019–2021	Yeclano Deportivo	30	(0)
2021–	Mérida	7	(0)
- * Club domestic league appearances and goals as of 3 April 2021

Carlos Selfa Sanfélix (born 25 April 1992) is a Spanish footballer who plays for Mérida AD as a central midfielder.

== Club career ==
Born in Sueca, Valencia, Valencian Community, Selfa joined Levante UD's youth setup in 2007, aged 15. He made his senior debuts with the reserves, playing his first campaign in Tercera División and the other two in Segunda División B.

In July 2013 Selfa moved to another reserve team, CA Osasuna B also in the fourth level. After appearing regularly he moved to UD Almería on 17 January of the following year, being assigned to the B-team in the third division.

On 23 November, after profiting from Corona's injury and Thomas Partey's suspension, Selfa was called up to the main squad for a La Liga match against Granada CF. He made his professional debut a day later, replacing Fernando Soriano in the 60th minute of the 0–0 away draw.

On 6 May 2015 Selfa renewed his contract with the Andalusians, signing until 2018. On 2 August of the following year, he was loaned to Real Balompédica Linense for one year, still in the third division.

Upon returning, Selfa terminated his contract with Almería on 11 August 2017, and joined third level club SCR Peña Deportiva just hours later.
