= Liberto Beltrán =

Spanish footballer (born 1996)

Personal information
- Full name: Liberto Luis Beltrán Martínez
- Date of birth: 26 December 1996 (age 29)
- Place of birth: Castellón de la Plana, Spain
- Height: 1.82 m (5 ft 11 1/2 in)
- Position: Winger

Youth career
- Castellón
- 2014–2015: → Elche (loan)

Senior career*
| Years | Team | Apps | (Gls) |
| 2014–2015 | Castellón | 0 | (0) |
| 2014–2015 | → Elche B (loan) | 17 | (4) |
| 2015–2016 | Elche B | 12 | (2) |
| 2015–2017 | Elche | 21 | (0) |
| 2016 | → Alcoyano (loan) | 17 | (5) |
| 2017–2020 | Betis B | 16 | (2) |
| 2018–2019 | → Cultural Leonesa (loan) | 15 | (1) |
| 2019–2020 | → Lleida Esportiu (loan) | 22 | (2) |
| 2020–2021 | Albacete | 8 | (1) |
| 2021 | → UCAM Murcia (loan) | 14 | (2) |
| 2021–2022 | UCAM Murcia | 34 | (1) |
| 2022 | AD Ceuta | 17 | (1) |
| 2023 | Alcoyano | 17 | (2) |
| 2024 | Tarazona | 19 | (3) |
| 2024–2025 | Mérida | 33 | (13) |
| 2025–2026 | Huesca | 26 | (2) |
- * Club domestic league appearances and goals as of 9 June 2026

Liberto Luis Beltrán Martínez (born 26 December 1996), sometimes known as just Liberto, is a Spanish footballer who plays mainly as a left winger.

== Club career ==
Born in Castellón de la Plana, Valencian Community, Liberto started his career at CD Castellón's youth setup. On 9 July 2014, still a youth, he was loaned to Elche CF for one year; initially assigned to the Juvenil squad, he made his senior debuts with the reserves in Segunda División B.

In July 2015 Liberto left Castellón, and subsequently returned to Elche. On 9 September he made his professional debut, starting and scoring his team's third in a 3–3 Copa del Rey away draw against UD Almería (3–4 loss on penalties).

On 14 January 2016, Liberto was loaned to CD Alcoyano in the third tier. Upon returning, he featured more regularly, and was definitely promoted to the main squad on 31 January 2017, being assigned the number 12 jersey.

On 29 August 2017, after Elche's relegation, Liberto moved to another reserve team, Betis Deportivo Balompié in the third division. Roughly one year later, he moved to fellow league team Cultural y Deportiva Leonesa on a one-year loan deal.

On 18 August 2020, after spending the previous campaign on loan at third division side Lleida Esportiu, Liberto moved to Albacete Balompié in the second level on a three-year contract. The following 22 January, after being sparingly used, he was loaned to UCAM Murcia CF for the remainder of the season.

On 7 July 2021, Liberto signed a permanent deal with UCAM, with the side now in Primera División RFEF. He continued to feature in that division in the following years, representing AD Ceuta FC, Alcoyano, SD Tarazona and Mérida AD; with the latter, he scored a career-best 13 goals as they missed out promotion in the play-offs.

On 3 July 2025, Liberto returned to the second division after signing a two-year deal with SD Huesca.
