= Alex Quintanilla =

Spanish footballer

Personal information
- Full name: Alexander Quintanilla Urionabarrenetxea
- Date of birth: 2 July 1990 (age 36)
- Place of birth: Bilbao, Spain
- Height: 1.83 m (6 ft 0 in)
- Position: Centre back

Youth career
- 1999–2000: Danok Bat
- 2000–2009: Athletic Bilbao
- 2008–2009: → Danok Bat (loan)

Senior career*
Years	Team	Apps	(Gls)
2009–2011	Bilbao Athletic	35	(0)
2009–2010	→ Portugalete (loan)	32	(0)
2011–2012	Alavés	29	(1)
2012–2014	Valencia B	42	(1)
2014–2016	Barakaldo	78	(5)
2016–2017	Almería	1	(0)
2017	Mirandés	13	(0)
2017	Almería	0	(0)
2018–2019	Córdoba	43	(2)
2019–2020	Ibiza	11	(1)
2020–2023	Gimnàstic	84	(7)
- * Club domestic league appearances and goals as of 28 May 2023

Alexander Quintanilla Urionabarrenetxea (born 2 July 1990) is a Spanish footballer. Mainly a central defender, he also plays as a defensive midfielder.

== Club career ==
Born in Bilbao, Biscay, Quintanilla finished his graduation with Danok Bat CF, on loan from Athletic Bilbao. In the 2009 summer he was loaned to Club Portugalete in Tercera División, making his senior debut for the club during the campaign.

In June 2010 Quintanilla returned to Athletic, being assigned to the reserves in Segunda División B. On 19 July 2011, after featuring regularly, he signed a one-year deal with fellow league team Deportivo Alavés.

On 10 July 2012 Quintanilla signed for another reserve team, Valencia CF Mestalla also in the third tier. He was called up to the first team by manager Mauricio Pellegrino for the pre-season, and was also an unused substitute in a 2–0 Copa del Rey away win against CA Osasuna on 11 December.

On 29 January 2014, Quintanilla signed a six-month contract with Barakaldo CF. He was an undisputed starter for the club during the following two seasons, contributing with three goals in 36 appearances in 2015–16.

On 22 July 2016, Quintanilla signed a two-year deal with Segunda División club UD Almería. He made his professional debut on 6 September, starting in a 0–2 Copa del Rey home loss against Rayo Vallecano.

Quintanilla's debut in the second level came on 21 September 2016, as he started and was sent off in a 0–4 away loss against UCAM Murcia CF. On 10 January 2017 he rescinded his contract, and moved to fellow league team CD Mirandés the following day.

Quintanilla returned to the Andalusians in June 2017, but still terminated his contract on 1 September. The following 31 January, he signed a two-and-a-half-year contract with Córdoba CF, still in the second division.

On 27 June 2019, after suffering relegation, Quintanilla left the Blanquiverdes after terminating his contract, and signed for third tier side UD Ibiza on 28 August. On 21 September 2020, he signed a one-year contract with Gimnàstic de Tarragona also in division three.

== Personal life ==
Quintanilla's father, Txirri, was also a footballer and a defender. He too was groomed at Athletic.
