= Juanjo (footballer, born 1985) =

Spanish footballer

Personal information
- Full name: Juan José Expósito Ruiz
- Date of birth: 28 October 1985 (age 41)
- Place of birth: Santander, Spain
- Height: 1.88 m (6 ft 2 in)
- Position: Forward

Youth career
- Racing Santander

Senior career*
Years	Team	Apps	(Gls)
2004–2005	Racing B	28	(18)
2005–2010	Racing Santander	62	(5)
2007–2008	→ Sevilla B (loan)	34	(7)
2008	→ Sevilla (loan)	1	(0)
2009	→ Alavés (loan)	19	(4)
2009–2010	→ Córdoba (loan)	29	(1)
2010–2011	Salamanca	29	(7)
2011–2013	Numancia	54	(11)
2013–2014	Ponferradina	15	(0)
2014	Tenerife	12	(3)
2014–2016	Llagostera	64	(10)
2016–2017	Almería	20	(0)
2017–2018	Racing Santander	23	(3)
Total		390	(69)
- * Club domestic league appearances and goals

Juan José Expósito Ruiz (born 28 October 1985), commonly known as Juanjo, is a Spanish former professional footballer who played as a forward.

He amassed Segunda División totals of 276 matches and 43 goals over ten seasons, in representation of Sevilla Atlético, Alavés, Córdoba, Salamanca, Numancia, Ponferradina, Tenerife, Llagostera and Almería. In La Liga, he appeared for Racing de Santander and Sevilla.

== Club career ==
Juanjo was born in Santander. After making his professional debut with hometown club Racing de Santander during 2004–05, he was relatively used (mainly as a substitute) over the course of the following two seasons. His maiden La Liga appearance took place on 22 May 2005, as the Cantabrians lost 2–0 at Málaga CF.

Juanjo was loaned in 2007–08, spending the campaign at Sevilla FC's reserves and scoring seven league goals to help them retain their Segunda División status. However, due to injuries and international duty, he also appeared in one top-division match on 12 January 2008, playing 30 minutes in a 2–0 away defeat against Athletic Bilbao.

In July 2008, Juanjo returned to Santander and, on 31 August, in 2008–09's opener, scored as a late substitute in a 1–1 home draw with former side Sevilla. However, after the arrival on loan of Serbian Nikola Žigić during the 2009 winter transfer window, he was deemed surplus to requirements, moving also on loan to Deportivo Alavés until the end of the season; another forward, Toni Moral, was bought from the Basques.

After not being able to help Alavés avoid relegation, Juanjo returned to his alma mater. In the dying minutes of the August 2009 transfer window, a third consecutive loan was arranged, now to Córdoba CF. During the second-tier campaign, although heavily featured, he only managed to score once for the Andalusians; in the off-season, he was definitely released by Racing and signed for another club in division two, UD Salamanca.

Juanjo continued competing in the second division the following years, with CD Numancia and SD Ponferradina. He scored eight goals in 34 games in 2011–12 with the former team, helping to a final tenth-place finish.

Juanjo subsequently represented second-tier sides CD Tenerife, UE Llagostera and UD Almería, suffering relegation with the second in 2016. On 2 August 2017, he returned to his first club Racing, now in the third league.
