= Javi Álamo =

Spanish footballer

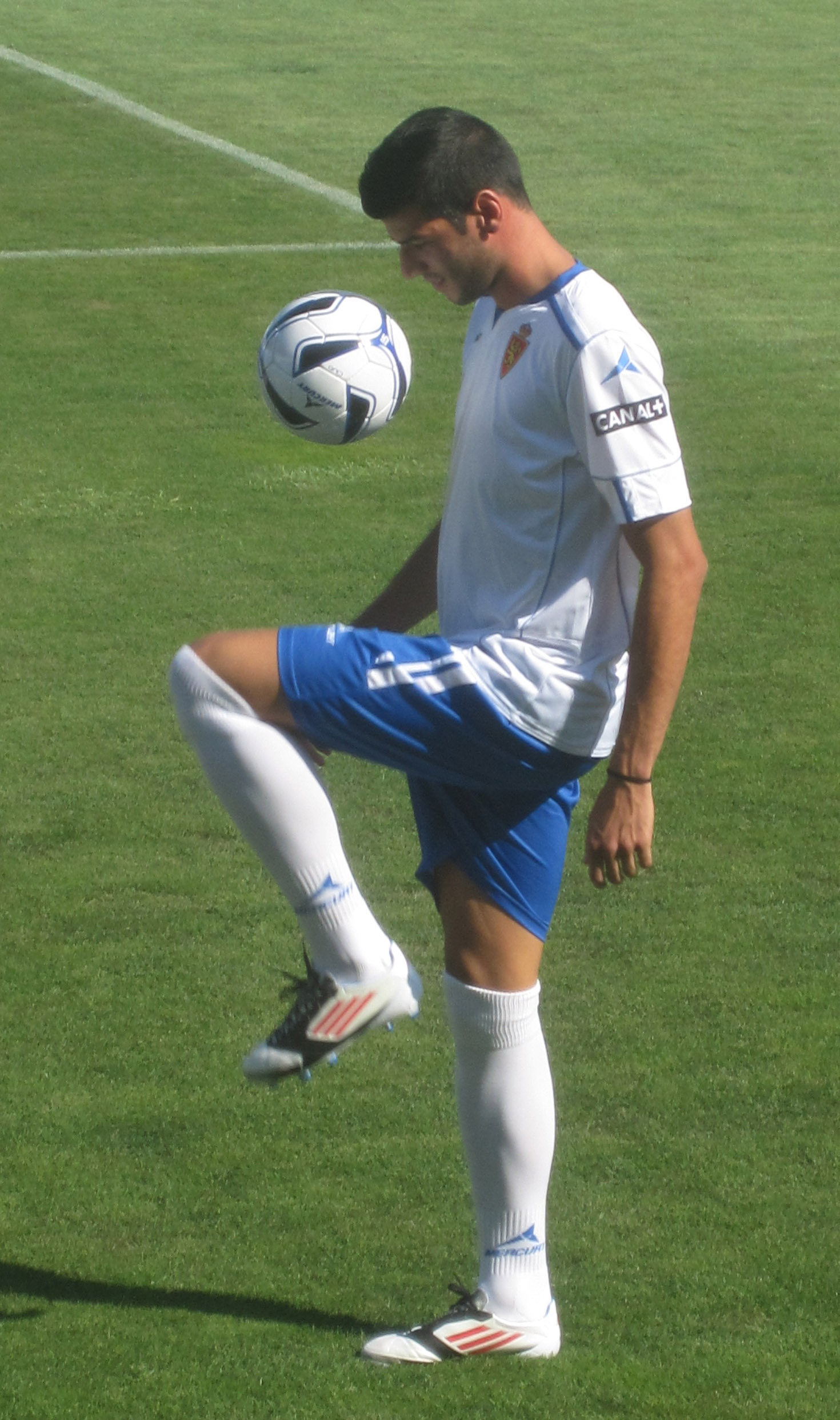
- Álamo being presented by Zaragoza

Personal information
- Full name: Javier Álamo Cruz
- Date of birth: 18 August 1988 (age 38)
- Place of birth: Gáldar, Spain
- Height: 1.90 m (6 ft 3 in)
- Position: Winger

Team information
- Current team: Cuarte (assistant)

Youth career
- Gáldar

Senior career*
Years	Team	Apps	(Gls)
2007–2008	Universidad LP B		
2007–2009	Universidad LP	44	(0)
2009	Cultural Leonesa	1	(0)
2009–2011	Mallorca B	7	(0)
2010–2011	→ Real Unión (loan)	32	(2)
2011–2012	Recreativo	37	(6)
2012–2016	Zaragoza	59	(2)
2015–2016	→ Girona (loan)	28	(0)
2016–2017	Osasuna	2	(0)
2017–2018	Almería	16	(0)
2019	Extremadura	4	(0)
2019–2020	Logroñés	6	(1)
2020	Barakaldo	6	(0)
2020–2022	Ejea	43	(1)
2022–2023	Brea	11	(0)

Managerial career
- 2023–: Cuarte (assistant)
- * Club domestic league appearances and goals

Javier 'Javi' Álamo Cruz (born 18 August 1988) is a retired Spanish professional footballer who played as a winger and current assistant coach of CD Cuarte.

== Football career ==
Born in Gáldar, Las Palmas, Álamo spent his first four seasons as a senior in the third division, with local Universidad de Las Palmas CF (two years), RCD Mallorca B and Real Unión. In the 2010–11 campaign he scored his first goals as a professional, but the Basques failed to return to the second level.

Álamo joined Recreativo de Huelva for 2011–12. He made his official debut for his new club on 27 August 2011, playing the full 90 minutes in a 0–1 away loss against Deportivo de La Coruña.

In late July 2012, Álamo signed a four-year contract with Real Zaragoza in La Liga. He first appeared in the competition on 16 September, coming on as a late substitute in a 0–2 defeat at Real Sociedad.

After suffering relegation in his first season, Álamo became a regular starter for the Aragonese side. On 10 August 2015, he was loaned to fellow second-tier club Girona FC in a season-long deal.

On 31 August 2016, free agent Álamo signed a one-year contract with CA Osasuna, recently promoted to the top flight. The following 17 January, after being rarely used in Navarre, he was released by mutual consent and joined UD Almería hours later.

On 5 January 2019, after six months without a club, Álamo signed for Extremadura UD still in the second division.

=== Post-retirement ===
After leaving Extremadura UD in July 2019, Álamo had spells at Barakaldo, SD Ejea and CD Brea, before retiring at the end of the 2022–23 season. Ahead of the 2023–24 season, Álamo decided to retire and was instead appointed assistant coach of José Luis Loreto at CD Cuarte.
