= Jesús Sillero =

Spanish footballer (born 1995)

Personal information
- Full name: Jesús Sillero Martín
- Date of birth: 28 December 1995 (age 30)
- Place of birth: Seville, Spain
- Height: 1.80 m (5 ft 11 in)
- Positions: Winger; forward

Team information
- Current team: Dos Hermanas
- Number: 7

Youth career
- Atlético Madrid
- Sevilla

Senior career*
Years	Team	Apps	(Gls)
2014–2015	Sevilla C	22	(3)
2015–2016	Cabecense	35	(15)
2016–2017	Almería B	39	(21)
2016	Almería	0	(0)
2017–2018	Córdoba B	21	(4)
2017	Córdoba	0	(0)
2018	Marbella	16	(2)
2019–2020	Don Benito	44	(12)
2020–2021	Recreativo	24	(3)
2021–2024	Villanovense	86	(19)
2024–2025	Guijuelo	31	(0)
2025–	Dos Hermanas	3	(1)
- * Club domestic league appearances and goals as of 21 September 2025

Jesús Sillero Martín (born 28 December 1995) is a Spanish footballer who plays as either a left winger or a forward for Tercera Federación club Dos Hermanas.

== Club career ==
Born in Seville, Andalusia, Sillero represented Atlético Madrid and Sevilla FC as a youth. He made his senior debut for the latter's C-team on 23 August 2014, coming on as a substitute and scoring a last-minute equalizer in a 1–1 Tercera División home draw against Cádiz CF B.

In July 2015, Sillero moved to CD Cabecense, also in the fourth level. In August of the following year, after scoring 15 goals, he signed for UD Almería, being assigned to the reserves in the same division.

On 6 September 2016 Sillero made his professional debut, replacing fellow debutant Josema in a 0–2 Copa del Rey home loss against Rayo Vallecano. On 2 April of the following year, he scored four goals for the B-side in a 4–2 home win against Atarfe Industrial CF, which included a hat-trick in only 34 minutes.

On 14 July 2017 Sillero moved to another reserve team, Córdoba CF B in Segunda División B. He made his first team debut on 20 September, starting in a 1–4 home loss against CD Tenerife also for the national cup.

On 21 July 2018, Sillero joined Marbella FC still in the third division. The following 25 January, he moved to fellow league team CD Don Benito, being an important unit as his side narrowly avoided relegation.

On 14 July 2020, Sillero agreed to a one-year contract with Recreativo de Huelva, also in division three. Huelva were relegated to the fifth level following league reorganisation.

On 18 June 2021, Sillero signed for Villanovense of the fourth level.

On 9 July 2024, he signed for Guijuelo, also of the fourth tier.
