= Benahadux =

- Municipality
- Flag Seal

- Location within Province of Almería Location within Andalusia Location within Spain
- Coordinates: 36°55′32.9″N 2°27′30.0″W
- Country: Spain
- A. community: Andalucía
- Province: Almería

Government
  - Mayor: Noelia José Damián

Area
  - Total: 16.62 km^{2} (6.42 sq mi)

Population (January 1, 2021)
  - Total: 4,534
  - Density: 272.8/km^{2} (707/sq mi)
- Time zone: UTC+01:00
- Postal code: 04410
- MCN: 04024
- Website: Official website

Benahadux (Spanish: [benaˈðu(ɣ)s]) is a municipality of Almería province, in the autonomous community of Andalusia, Spain.

== History ==
El Chuche is the earliest suburb in the town, founded in the Bronze Age. It was possessed by the Romans, after which it was named Urci, and became an important Christian hub.

The Moors conquered it in the eighth century, specifically the Banu Abdus tribe, which gave rise to the modern town. Intensive agriculture flourished during their reign due to their advanced watering systems. Fruit trees, cereal crops, vegetables, olive trees and berry shrubs were grown during this period.

After the Moors were forced out in 1489 by Christian settlers, their properties were taken. Don Gutierre de Cárdenas gave his properties to Franciscan nuns, who became the biggest landowners in Benahadux till the nineteenth century.

El Chuche includes Cerro del Paredón and Las Agüicas.

== Demographics ==
Historical population
Year	Pop.	±%
1999	2,775	—
2000	2,814	+1.4%
2001	2,888	+2.6%
2002	2,924	+1.2%
2003	2,983	+2.0%
2004	3,058	+2.5%
2005	3,205	+4.8%
2009	3,940	+22.9%
2010	4,059	+3.0%
2011	4,166	+2.6%

== See also ==
- List of municipalities in Almería
