= Carlos Garrido (footballer, born 1994) =

Spanish footballer

Personal information
- Full name: Carlos Garrido Serrano
- Date of birth: 2 April 1994 (age 32)
- Place of birth: Alcalá la Real, Spain
- Height: 1.80 m (5 ft 11 in)
- Position: Centre back

Team information
- Current team: Huétor Vega

Youth career
- Alcalá
- 2004–2013: Sevilla

Senior career*
Years	Team	Apps	(Gls)
2013–2015	Sevilla B	61	(0)
2015–2016	Sporting B	28	(2)
2016–2017	Almería B	20	(2)
2017	Almería	1	(0)
2017–2018	Unión Adarve	20	(1)
2018–2019	El Ejido	14	(0)
2019–2020	Granada B	20	(1)
2021	Lorca Deportiva	11	(2)
2021–2022	Don Benito	11	(1)
2022–2023	Antequera	14	(0)
2024	Real Jaén	3	(0)
2024–2025	Atlètic d'Escaldes	3	(0)
2025–	Huétor Vega	11	(1)

International career
2009	Spain U16	4	(0)
2010–2011	Spain U17	8	(0)
- * Club domestic league appearances and goals as of 9 November 2025

Carlos Garrido Serrano (Note: In this Spanish name, the first or paternal surname is Garrido and the second or maternal family name is Serrano.) (born 2 April 1994) is a Spanish footballer who plays for Tercera Federación club Huétor Vega as a central defender.

== Club career ==
Born in Alcalá la Real, Jaén, Andalusia, Garrido joined Sevilla FC's youth setup in 2004 at the age of ten. He was promoted to the reserves ahead of the 2013–14 season, and made his debut on 30 August 2013 by starting in a 0–0 away draw against La Hoya Lorca CF.

On 21 August 2015 Garrido moved to another reserve team, Sporting de Gijón B also in the third level. He scored his first senior goal on 25 March of the following year, but in a 2–6 home loss against CD Izarra.

On 11 August 2016 Garrido signed for UD Almería, being initially assigned to the B-side in Tercera División. He made his first team debut the following 29 January, starting as a right back in a 3–0 Segunda División home win over Real Oviedo.
