= 2017–18 UD Almería season =

UD Almería
2017–18 season
- President: Alfonso García
- Head coach: Fran Fernández
- Stadium: Juegos Mediterráneos
- Segunda División: 18th
- Copa del Rey: First round
- Top goalscorer: League: Rubén Alcaraz (9); All: Rubén Alcaraz (9)
Home colours	Away colours

The 2017–18 season was UD Almería's twentieth seventh season of existence and the third consecutive in Segunda División.

== Squad ==
As of 18 June 2018

No.	Name	Pos.	Nat.	Place of birth	Date of birth (age)	Club caps	Club goals	Int. caps	Int. goals	Signed from	Date signed	Fee	Contract End
Goalkeepers
1	René Román	GK	(Spain) (Andalusia)	El Bosque	15 December 1983 (aged 34)	42	0	–	–	Girona	5 July 2017	Free	30 June 2019
13	Fernando	GK	(Spain) (Region of Murcia)	Murcia	10 June 1990 (aged 27)	1	0	–	–	UCAM Murcia	5 July 2017	Free	30 June 2019
Defenders
2	Fran Rodríguez	RB/RW	(Spain) (Andalusia)	Almuñécar	22 May 1995 (aged 23)	22	2	–	–	Zaragoza	12 July 2017	Free	30 June 2019
3	Lucien Owona	CB	(Cameroon)	Douala	9 August 1990 (aged 27)	21	0	1	0	Alcorcón	22 July 2017	Free	30 June 2020
5	Ángel Trujillo	CB	(Spain) (Community of Madrid)	Madrid	8 September 1987 (aged 30)	154	1	–	–	Levante	5 August 2016	Free	30 June 2019
7	Marco Motta	RB/RW	(Italy)	Merate	14 May 1986 (aged 32)	46	3	1	0	Free agent	31 January 2017	Free	30 June 2019
21	Nano	LB	(Spain) (Andalusia)	Málaga	27 October 1984 (aged 33)	72	0	–	–	Panathinaikos (Greece)	24 August 2016	Free	30 June 2018
23	Jorge Morcillo (c)	CB/LB	(Spain) (Valencian Community)	Valencia	11 March 1986 (aged 32)	93	7	–	–	Rayo Vallecano	4 July 2015	Free	30 June 2018
24	Joaquín	CB/DM	(Spain) (Andalusia)	Huércal de Almería	31 May 1996 (aged 22)	75	0	–	–	Almería B	14 October 2015	Free	30 June 2021
29	Iván Martos	CB/LB	(Spain) (Catalonia)	Manresa	15 May 1997 (aged 21)	0	0	–	–	Almería B	7 December 2017	Free	Undisclosed
30	Pervis Estupiñán	LB/LW	(Ecuador)	Esmeraldas	28 January 1998 (aged 20)	9	0	–	–	Watford (England)	17 July 2017	Loan	30 June 2018
34	Antonio Navas	RB	(Spain) (Andalusia)	El Ejido	13 February 1995 (aged 23)	3	0	–	–	Almería B	6 September 2016	Free	30 June 2018
39	Igor Engonga	CB	(Equatorial Guinea)	Santander (Spain)	4 January 1996 (aged 22)	0	0	–	–	Almería B	1 June 2018	Free	Undisclosed
Midfielders
4	Verza	DM/CM	(Spain) (Valencian Community)	Orihuela	26 September 1986 (aged 31)	181	18	–	–	Levante	31 August 2017	Loan	30 June 2018
6	Mandi	DM/CM	(Spain) (Canary Islands)	Santa Lucía	1 March 1989 (aged 29)	23	0	–	–	Elche	8 July 2017	Free	30 June 2018
8	Tino Costa	CM/AM	(Argentina)	Las Flores	9 January 1985 (aged 33)	15	2	2	0	San Lorenzo	1 August 2017	Free	30 June 2018
10	José Ángel Pozo	AM/RW/ST	(Spain) (Andalusia)	Málaga	15 March 1996 (aged 22)	108	7	–	–	Manchester City (England)	31 August 2015	€500K	30 June 2020
11	Javi Álamo	RW/LW/RB	(Spain) (Canary Islands)	Gáldar	18 August 1988 (aged 29)	17	0	–	–	Osasuna	17 January 2017	Free	30 June 2018
14	Rubén Alcaraz	CM/AM	(Spain) (Catalonia)	Barcelona	1 May 1991 (aged 27)	42	9	–	–	Girona	11 July 2017	Loan	30 June 2018
16	Fidel	LW/RW	(Spain) (Andalusia)	Dehesa de Ríotinto	27 October 1989 (aged 28)	71	12	–	–	Córdoba	19 July 2016	€500K	30 June 2021
17	Lass Bangoura	RW/LW	(Guinea)	Conakry	30 March 1992 (aged 26)	10	0	31	4	Rayo Vallecano	1 February 2018	Loan	30 June 2018
18	Sulayman Marreh	CM/DM	(The Gambia)	Abuko	15 January 1996 (aged 22)	12	1	12	0	Watford (England)	26 January 2018	Loan	30 June 2018
26	Francisco Callejón	CM	(Spain) (Andalusia)	Almería	15 May 1998 (aged 20)	3	0	–	–	Almería B	8 April 2017	Free	Undisclosed
28	Àlex Corredera	AM/CM	(Spain) (Catalonia)	Sant Joan	19 September 1996 (aged 21)	3	0	–	–	Deportivo B	9 July 2017	Free	30 June 2019
31	Gaspar	LW	(Spain) (Castilla–La Mancha)	Tarazona la Mancha	9 December 1997 (aged 20)	33	2	–	–	Almería B	11 September 2014	Free	30 June 2021
33	Lin Liangming	RW/LW	(China)	Shantou	4 June 1997 (aged 20)	1	0	–	–	Real Madrid B	24 August 2017	Loan	30 June 2018
37	Óscar Lozano	RW/LW	(Spain) (Andalusia)	Motril	14 June 1996 (aged 21)	2	0	–	–	Almería B	14 December 2017	Free	Undisclosed
40	Javi Moreno	RW	(Spain) (Andalusia)	Almería	14 June 1996 (aged 21)	0	0	–	–	Almería B	13 May 2018	Free	Undisclosed
Forwards
9	Juan Muñoz	ST	(Spain) (Andalusia)	Utrera	12 November 1995 (aged 22)	25	4	–	–	Sevilla	8 August 2017	Loan	30 June 2018
19	Hicham	ST/LW	(Morocco)	San Javier (Spain)	7 May 1995 (aged 23)	29	2	–	–	Almería B	17 December 2013	Free	30 June 2021
20	Pablo Caballero	ST	(Argentina)	Totoras	21 July 1986 (aged 31)	28	3	–	–	Lugo	17 July 2017	Free	30 June 2019
22	Edoardo Soleri	ST	(Italy)	Rome	19 October 1997 (aged 20)	11	2	–	–	Roma (Italy)	20 January 2018	Loan	30 June 2018
36	Sekou Gassama	ST	(Spain) (Catalonia)	Granollers	6 May 1995 (aged 23)	0	0	–	–	Almería B	14 December 2017	Free	30 June 2018

== Coaches ==
Name	Nat.	Place of birth	Date of birth (age)	Signed from	Date signed	Role	Departure	Manner	Contract End
Luis Miguel Ramis	(Spain) (Catalonia)	Tarragona	25 July 1970 (aged 47)	Free agent	14 March 2017	Permanent	12 November 2017	Sacked	30 June 2018
Fran Fernández	(Spain) (Andalusia)	Almería	20 March 1980 (aged 38)	Almería B	12 November 2017	Interim	17 November 2017	Ended tenure (Note: Alcaraz was signed on 16 November 2017, but Fernández was in charge of the club in a match against Zaragoza the following day)	30 June 2018
Lucas Alcaraz	(Spain) (Andalusia)	Granada	21 June 1966 (aged 51)	Free agent	16 November 2017	Permanent	24 April 2018	Resigned	30 June 2018
Fran Fernández	(Spain) (Andalusia)	Almería	20 March 1980 (aged 38)	Almería B	24 April 2018	Permanent			30 June 2018

=== Staff members ===
Name	Staff role
Ricardo Molina	Assistant coach Goalkeeping coach
Edu Frapoli	Fitness coach
Javier Fernández	Technical coach
Ángel Férez	Goalkeeping coach
Misael Rivas	Doctor
Fran Simón	Physio
Pedro Serrano	Physio

Source: UD Almería's official website

== Transfers ==
=== In ===
No.	Pos.	Nat.	Name	Age	EU	Moving from	Type	Transfer window	Ends	Transfer fee	Source
18	DF	(Spain)	Antonio Marín	21	EU	Granada B	Loan return	Summer	2019	Free	UD Almería
27	MF	(Spain)	Carlos Selfa	25	EU	Linense	Loan return	Summer	2018	Free	UD Almería
19	FW	(Morocco)	Hicham Khaloua	22	EU	Celta B	Loan return	Summer	2018	Free	UD Almería
31	MF	(Spain)	Gaspar	19	EU	Almería B	Promoted	Summer	2018	Free	UD Almería
4	DF	(Spain)	Alex Quintanilla	26	EU	Mirandés	Transfer	Summer	2018	Free	UD Almería
1	GK	(Spain)	René Román	33	EU	Girona	Transfer	Summer	2019	Free	UD Almería
13	GK	(Spain)	Fernando	27	EU	UCAM Murcia	Transfer	Summer	2019	Free	UD Almería
6	MF	(Spain)	Mandi	28	EU	Elche	Transfer	Summer	2018	Free	UD Almería
14	MF	(Spain)	Rubén Alcaraz	26	EU	Girona	Loan	Summer	2018	Free	UD Almería
2	DF	(Spain)	Fran Rodríguez	22	EU	Zaragoza	Transfer	Summer	2019	Free	UD Almería
30	DF	(Ecuador)	Pervis Estupiñán	19	Non-EU	Watford (England)	Transfer	Summer	2018	Free	UD Almería
20	FW	(Argentina)	Pablo Caballero	30	EU	Lugo	Transfer	Summer	2019	Free	UD Almería
3	DF	(Cameroon)	Lucien Owona	26	EU	Alcorcón	Transfer	Summer	2020	€70K	UD Almería
8	MF	(Argentina)	Tino Costa	32	EU	San Lorenzo (Argentina)	Transfer	Summer	2018	Free	UD Almería
15	MF	(Spain)	Nauzet Alemán	32	EU	Free agent	Transfer	Summer	2018	Free	UD Almería
29	MF	(Spain)	Javi Pérez	22	EU	Almería B	Transfer	Summer	2018	Free	La Voz de Almería
4	MF	(Spain)	Verza	30	EU	Levante	Loan	Summer	2018	Free	UD Almería
22	FW	(Italy)	Edoardo Soleri	20	EU	Roma (Italy)	Loan	Winter	2018	Free	UD Almería
18	MF	(The Gambia)	Sulayman Marreh	22	EU	Watford (England)	Loan	Winter	2018	Free	UD Almería
17	MF	(Guinea)	Lass Bangoura	25	EU	Rayo Vallecano	Loan	Winter	2018	Free	UD Almería

Total spending: ▼€70,000

=== Out ===
No.	Pos.	Nat.	Name	Age	EU	Moving to	Type	Transfer window	Transfer fee	Source
15	MF	(Spain)	Corona	36	EU	Free agent	Retired	Summer	Free	UD Almería
25	MF	(France)	Karim Yoda	28	EU	Getafe	Loan return	Summer	Free	UD Almería
3	DF	(Spain)	Fran Vélez	26	EU	Wisła Kraków (Poland)	Contract rescinded	Summer	Free	UD Almería
22	MF	(Spain)	Iván Sánchez	24	EU	Albacete	Transfer	Summer	Free	UD Almería
13	GK	(Spain)	Casto	35	EU	Alcorcón	Contract ended	Summer	Free	
1	GK	(Spain)	Julián Cuesta	26	EU	Wisła Kraków (Poland)	Contract ended	Summer	Free	
2	DF	(Spain)	Isidoro	30	EU	Free agent	Contract ended	Summer	Free	
4	DF	(Spain)	Ximo Navarro	27	EU	Las Palmas	Contract ended	Summer	Free	
12	DF	(Portugal)	Henrique Sereno	32	EU	Free agent	Contract ended	Summer	Free	
5	MF	(Spain)	Borja Fernández	36	EU	Valladolid	Contract ended	Summer	Free	
8	MF	(Nigeria)	Ramon Azeez	24	EU	Lugo	Contract ended	Summer	Free	
17	MF	(Spain)	Antonio Puertas	25	EU	Granada	Contract ended	Summer	Free	
18	FW	(Spain)	Juanjo Expósito	31	EU	Racing Santander	Contract ended	Summer	Free	
22	FW	(Nigeria)	Kalu Uche	34	EU	Free agent	Contract ended	Summer	Free	
9	FW	(Spain)	Quique González	27	EU	Osasuna	Transfer	Summer	€1.5M	UD Almería
12	FW	(Spain)	Chuli	26	EU	Getafe	Transfer	Summer	€700K	Getafe CF
6	MF	(Senegal)	Pape Maly Diamanka	27	EU	Numancia	Contract rescinded	Summer	Free	UD Almería
27	MF	(Spain)	Carlos Selfa	25	EU	Peña Deportiva	Contract rescinded	Summer	Free	UD Almería
17	MF	(Spain)	Iago Díaz	24	EU	Ponferradina	Contract rescinded	Summer	Free	UD Almería
29	MF	(Spain)	Javi Pérez	22	EU	Valladolid B	Contract rescinded	Summer	Free	UD Almería
4	DF	(Spain)	Alex Quintanilla	27	EU	Free agent	Contract rescinded	Summer	Free	UD Almería
18	DF	(Spain)	Antonio Marín	21	EU	Granada B	Contract rescinded	Summer	Free	UD Almería
15	MF	(Spain)	Nauzet Alemán	32	EU	Retired	Contract rescinded	Winter	Free	UD Almería

Total gaining: ▲€2,200,000

Balance

Total: ▼€2,130,000

=== Contracts ===
No.	Pos.	Nat.	Name	Age	Status	Contract length	Expiry date	Source
31	MF	(Spain)	Gaspar	19	Signed	4 years	June 2021	UD Almería
19	FW	(Morocco)	Hicham Khaloua	22	Signed	4 years	June 2021	UD Almería

== Player statistics ==
=== Squad statistics ===
As of 18 June 2018

No.	Pos	Nat	Player	Total		Segunda División		Copa del Rey	
No.	Pos	Nat	Player	Apps	Goals	Apps	Goals	Apps	Goals
1	GK	(Spain) ESP	René	42	0	42	0	0	0
2	DF	(Spain) ESP	Fran Rodríguez	22	2	16+5	2	1	0
3	DF	(Cameroon) CMR	Lucien Owona	21	0	15+5	0	1	0
4	MF	(Spain) ESP	Verza	25	2	15+9	2	1	0
5	DF	(Spain) ESP	Ángel Trujillo	20	0	16+3	0	0+1	0
6	MF	(Spain) ESP	Mandi	23	0	20+3	0	0	0
7	DF	(Italy) ITA	Marco Motta	31	3	29+2	3	0	0
8	MF	(Argentina) ARG	Tino Costa	15	2	5+9	2	1	0
9	FW	(Spain) ESP	Juan Muñoz	25	4	16+9	4	0	0
10	FW	(Spain) ESP	José Ángel Pozo	39	2	37+2	2	0	0
11	MF	(Spain) ESP	Javi Álamo	11	0	2+8	0	1	0
13	GK	(Spain) ESP	Fernando	1	0	0	0	1	0
14	MF	(Spain) ESP	Rubén Alcaraz	42	9	39+2	9	0+1	0
16	MF	(Spain) ESP	Fidel	31	4	24+7	4	0	0
17	MF	(Guinea) GUI	Lass Bangoura	10	0	5+5	0	0	0
18	MF	(The Gambia) GAM	Sulayman Marreh	12	1	12	1	0	0
19	FW	(Morocco) MAR	Hicham	24	1	11+12	1	1	0
20	FW	(Argentina) ARG	Pablo Caballero	28	3	11+16	3	1	0
21	DF	(Spain) ESP	Nano	35	0	32+3	0	0	0
22	FW	(Italy) ITA	Edoardo Soleri	11	2	9+2	2	0	0
23	DF	(Spain) ESP	Jorge Morcillo	26	2	26	2	0	0
24	DF	(Spain) ESP	Joaquín	36	0	34+1	0	1	0
26	MF	(Spain) ESP	Francisco Callejón	2	0	1+1	0	0	0
28	MF	(Spain) ESP	Àlex Corredera	3	0	1+2	0	0	0
29	DF	(Spain) ESP	Iván Martos	0	0	0	0	0	0
30	DF	(Ecuador) ECU	Pervis Estupiñán	27	0	19+7	0	1	0
31	MF	(Spain) ESP	Gaspar	25	1	21+4	1	0	0
33	MF	(China) CHN	Lin Liangming	1	0	0	0	1	0
34	DF	(Spain) ESP	Antonio Navas	2	0	1+1	0	0	0
36	FW	(Spain) ESP	Sekou Gassama	0	0	0	0	0	0
37	MF	(Spain) ESP	Óscar Lozano	2	0	0+2	0	0	0
39	DF	(Equatorial Guinea) GEQ	Igor Engonga	0	0	0	0	0	0
40	MF	(Spain) ESP	Javi Moreno	0	0	0	0	0	0
Players on loan to other clubs:
Players who have left the club after the start of the season:
15	MF	(Spain) ESP	Nauzet Alemán	8	0	3+4	0	0+1	0

=== Top scorers ===
Place	Position	Nation	Number	Name	Segunda División	Copa del Rey	Total
1	MF	(Spain)	14	Rubén Alcaraz	9	0	9
2	FW	(Spain)	9	Juan Muñoz	4	0	4
2	MF	(Spain)	16	Fidel	4	0	4
3	DF	(Italy)	7	Marco Motta	3	0	3
3	FW	(Argentina)	20	Pablo Caballero	3	0	3
4	DF	(Spain)	2	Fran Rodríguez	2	0	2
4	MF	(Spain)	4	Verza	2	0	2
4	MF	(Argentina)	8	Tino Costa	2	0	2
4	FW	(Spain)	10	José Ángel Pozo	2	0	2
4	FW	(Italy)	22	Edoardo Soleri	2	0	2
4	DF	(Spain)	23	Jorge Morcillo	2	0	2
5	MF	(The Gambia)	18	Sulayman Marreh	1	0	1
5	FW	(Morocco)	19	Hicham	1	0	1
5	MF	(Spain)	31	Gaspar	1	0	1
				TOTALS	38	0	38

=== Disciplinary record ===
Number	Nation	Position	Name	Segunda División		Copa del Rey		Total	
Number	Nation	Position	Name	Yellow card	Red card	Yellow card	Red card	Yellow card	Red card
7	(Italy)	DF	Marco Motta	11	1	0	0	11	1
23	(Spain)	DF	Jorge Morcillo	10	2	0	0	10	2
24	(Spain)	DF	Joaquín	9	1	0	0	9	1
14	(Spain)	MF	Rubén Alcaraz	9	0	0	0	9	0
6	(Spain)	MF	Mandi	8	0	0	0	8	0
10	(Spain)	FW	José Ángel Pozo	7	1	0	0	7	1
18	(The Gambia)	MF	Sulayman Marreh	7	1	0	0	7	1
4	(Spain)	MF	Verza	6	0	0	0	6	0
21	(Spain)	DF	Nano	6	0	0	0	6	0
1	(Spain)	GK	René Román	5	0	0	0	5	0
16	(Spain)	MF	Fidel	4	1	0	0	4	1
2	(Spain)	DF	Fran Rodríguez	4	0	0	0	4	0
3	(Cameroon)	DF	Lucien Owona	3	0	0	0	3	0
5	(Spain)	DF	Ángel Trujillo	3	0	0	0	3	0
31	(Spain)	MF	Gaspar	3	0	0	0	3	0
17	(Guinea)	MF	Lass Bangoura	2	0	0	0	2	0
20	(Argentina)	FW	Pablo Caballero	2	0	0	0	2	0
22	(Italy)	FW	Edoardo Soleri	2	0	0	0	2	0
30	(Ecuador)	DF	Pervis Estupiñán	2	0	0	0	2	0
8	(Argentina)	MF	Tino Costa	0	1	1	0	1	1
9	(Spain)	FW	Juan Muñoz	1	0	0	0	1	0
19	(Morocco)	FW	Hicham	1	0	0	0	1	0
34	(Spain)	DF	Antonio Navas	1	0	0	0	1	0
			TOTALS	106	8	1	0	107	6

== Competitions ==
=== Pre-season/Friendlies ===
22 July 2017	Almería	1 – 0	Levante	Murcia
	Pozo 51'	Report		Stadium: Pinatar Arena; Referee: Juan Antonio Campos Salinas

26 July 2017	Almería	2 – 1	Sevilla Atlético	Mijas
	Alcaraz 44'; Hicham 84'	Report	38' Curro	Stadium: La Cala Golf; Referee: Beatriz Torres

29 July 2017	Almería	0 – 1	Córdoba	Marbella
		Report	86' Quiles	Stadium: Marbella Football Impact; Referee: Carlos Vecino Ramírez

5 August 2017	Lorca	1 – 0	Almería	Marbella
	Ojeda 72' (pen.)	Report		Stadium: Artés Carrasco; Referee: Dámaso Arcediano Monescillo

9 August 2017	Águilas	0 – 2	Almería	Águilas
		Report	60' Hicham; 71' (pen.) Morcillo	Stadium: El Rubial; Referee: Pérez Jurado

12 August 2017	Granada	1 – 1	Almería	Baza
	Joselu 25'; Espinosa (yellow card) 44'; Baena (yellow card) 57' (yellow-red card) 60'	Report	(yellow card) 60' Fidel; 81' Estupiñán	Stadium: Constantino Navarro; Attendance: 450; Referee: Patricia Torres

=== Segunda División ===
Pos	Team	Pld	W	D	L	GF	GA	GD	Pts	Promotion, qualification or relegation
16	Córdoba	42	15	6	21	57	65	−8	51	
17	Albacete	42	11	16	15	35	46	−11	49	
18	Almería	42	12	12	18	38	45	−7	48 (Note: Almería finished ahead of Cultural Leonesa on head-to head points: Cultural Leonesa 0–0 Almería, Almería 2–1 Cultural Leonesa)	
19	Cultural Leonesa (R)	42	11	15	16	54	67	−13	48	Relegation to Segunda División B
20	Barcelona B (R)	42	10	14	18	46	54	−8	44	Relegation to Segunda División B

Source: La Liga
Rules for classification: 1) points; 2) head-to-head points; 3) head-to-head goal difference; 4) goal difference; 5) number of goals scored
(R) Relegated

==== Results summary ====
Overall								Home						Away					
Pld	W	D	L	GF	GA	GD	Pts	W	D	L	GF	GA	GD	W	D	L	GF	GA	GD
42	12	12	18	38	45	−7	48	9	6	6	22	18	+4	3	6	12	16	27	−11

Last updated: 18 June 2018.
Source: Competitive matches

==== Results by round ====
Round	1	2	3	4	5	6	7	8	9	10	11	12	13	14	15	16	17	18	19	20	21	22	23	24	25	26	27	28	29	30	31	32	33	34	35	36	37	38	39	40	41	42
Ground	A	H	A	H	A	H	A	H	A	H	H	A	H	A	H	A	H	A	H	A	H	H	A	H	A	H	A	H	A	H	A	A	H	A	H	A	H	A	H	A	H	A
Result	W	D	L	W	L	W	D	L	L	D	L	L	L	L	W	D	W	L	W	L	W	D	L	D	W	L	W	W	D	L	L	L	L	D	D	L	W	D	W	L	D	D
Position	5	5	12	8	11	5	5	11	15	14	16	17	20	20	19	20	15	18	14	16	14	15	17	19	15	18	16	14	14	15	16	17	18	17	17	18	18	17	15	16	19	18

Updated to match(es) played on 18 June 2018. Source:
A = Away; H = Home; W = Win; D = Draw; L = Loss

==== Matches ====
20 August 2017 1	Gimnàstic	0 – 1	Almería	Tarragona
20:30	Tejera (yellow card) 82'; Maikel (yellow card) 84'		30' Caballero; (yellow card) 79' Pozo	Stadium: Nou Estadi; Attendance: 4,978; Referee: Óliver de la Fuente Ramos

26 August 2017 2	Almería	1 – 1	Oviedo	Almería
22:00	Joaquín (yellow card) 48'; Fidel (yellow card) 56'; Pozo 58'; Alcaraz (yellow card) 76'		(yellow card) 42' Hidi; 55' Saúl Berjón; (yellow card) 68' Christian; (yellow card) 90+2' Viti	Stadium: Juegos Mediterráneos; Attendance: 6,899; Referee: Eduardo Prieto Iglesias

2 September 2017 3	Numancia	1 – 0	Almería	Numancia
16:00	Milla 67'; Pablo Valcarce (yellow card) 74'; Mateu (yellow card) 90+2'		(yellow card) 36' Motta; (yellow card) 38' Mandi; (yellow card) 44' Joaquín; (yellow card) 47' Morcillo; (yellow card) 66' Caballero	Stadium: Los Pajaritos; Attendance: 2,327; Referee: Rubén Eiriz Mata

9 September 2017 4	Almería	2 – 1	Lorca	Almería
20:00	Mandi (yellow card) 27'; Morcillo (yellow card) 51'; René (yellow card) 57'; Fran 62'; Costa 89'		(yellow card) 21' Tropi; (yellow card) 78' (goal) 84' Javi Muñoz; (yellow card) 88' Pomares; (yellow card) 90+3' Pina	Stadium: Juegos Mediterráneos; Attendance: 7,354; Referee: Isidro Díaz de Mera

16 September 2017 5	Osasuna	2 – 1	Almería	Pamplona
20:00	Torró (yellow card) 54'; Quique 70'; Oier (yellow card) 71'; Xisco (yellow card) 73'; Coris 77'	Report	(yellow card) 14' Mandi; 22' Fidel; (yellow card) 68' Morcillo	Stadium: El Sadar; Attendance: 13,843; Referee: Santiago Varón Aceitón

22 September 2017 6	Almería	3 – 0	Sevilla Atlético	Almería
21:00	Morcillo 45+2' (pen.); Nano (yellow card) 59'; Verza (yellow card) 69'; Costa 76'; Pozo 90+3'	Report	(yellow card) 41' Carmona; (yellow card) 45+1' Yan	Stadium: Juegos Mediterráneos; Attendance: 7,306; Referee: Jorge Valdés Aller

29 September 2017 7	Cultural Leonesa	0 – 0	Almería	León
20:30	Yeray (yellow card) 54'; Yasser (yellow card) 56' (yellow-red card) 90+6'; Viti (yellow card) 81'; Zuiverloon (yellow card) 90+1'; Ortiz (yellow card) 90+5'	Report	(yellow card) 23' (yellow-red card) 77' Morcillo; (yellow card) 33' Mandi; (yellow card) 54' Verza; (yellow card) 60' Fran; (yellow card) 90+5' René	Stadium: Reino de León; Attendance: 7,349; Referee: Aitor Gorostegui Fernández Ortega

7 October 2017 8	Almería	0 – 3	Huesca	Almería
18:00		Report	27' 53' Hernández; (yellow card) 32' González; 43' Melero; (yellow card) 82' Vadillo	Stadium: Juegos Mediterráneos; Attendance: 7,226; Referee: Saúl Ais Reig

12 October 2017 9	Rayo Vallecano	1 – 0	Almería	Madrid
21:00	Embarba (yellow card) 44'; Comesaña 53'; Unai López (yellow card) 68'	Report	(yellow card) 43' (yellow-red card) 84' Pozo; (red card) 45' Morcillo; (yellow card) 62' Nano	Stadium: Campo de Fútbol de Vallecas; Attendance: 8,615; Referee: Juan Luis Pulido Santana

15 October 2017 10	Almería	1 – 1	Valladolid	Almería
19:00	Verza 2'; Muñoz (yellow card) 78'; Fidel (red card) 90+3'	Report	36' (pen.) Mata; (yellow card) 81' Borja; (yellow card) 90+3' Toni	Stadium: Juegos Mediterráneos; Attendance: 7,260; Referee: Iñaki Bikandi Garrido

22 October 2017 11	Almería	0 – 1	Reus	Almería
21:00		Report	38' (yellow card) 58' Borja Fernández; (yellow card) 76' Édgar	Stadium: Juegos Mediterráneos; Attendance: 6,931; Referee: Gorka Sagues Oscoz

28 October 2017 12	Sporting Gijón	2 – 0	Almería	Gijón
21:00	Santos 16'; Joaquín 37' (o.g.); Sergio Álvarez (yellow card) 69'; Isma López (yellow card) 85'	Report	(yellow card) 80' Joaquín	Stadium: El Molinón; Attendance: 20,987; Referee: Eduardo Prieto Iglesias

5 November 2017 13	Almería	0 – 2	Cádiz	Almería
20:00	Pozo (yellow card) 67'; Mandi (yellow card) 78'; Alcaraz (yellow card) 90'		(yellow card) 23' Garrido; (yellow card) 31' José Mari; 39' 49' Salvi; (yellow card) 63' Carpio; (yellow card) 75' Álvaro García	Stadium: Juegos Mediterráneos; Attendance: 6,990; Referee: Dámaso Arcediano Monescillo

11 November 2017 14	Albacete	2 – 0	Almería	Albacete
16:00	Héctor Hernández (yellow card) 19'; Dani Rodríguez 36'; Erice (yellow card) 47'		(yellow card) 31' Morcillo; (yellow card) 45+2' (yellow-red card) 90+2' Joaquín; (yellow card) 62' Caballero	Stadium: Carlos Belmonte; Attendance: 6,712; Referee: Álvaro Moreno Aragón

17 November 2017 15	Almería	3 – 0	Zaragoza	Almería
21:00	Fran 43'; Morcillo (yellow card) 68'; Owona (yellow card) 75'; Alcaraz 80' 90+3'		(yellow card) 46' Grippo; (yellow card) 59' Delmás	Stadium: Juegos Mediterráneos; Attendance: 5,260; Referee: Daniel Ocón Arráiz

26 November 2017 16	Barcelona B	1 – 1	Almería	Barcelona
12:00	Lozano (yellow card) 20' (goal) 55'; Busquets (yellow card) 35'; Palencia (yellow card) 63'; Ortolá (yellow card) 64'		(yellow card) 38' Joaquín; 64' (pen.) Verza; (yellow card) 73' Gaspar; (yellow card) 86' Alcaraz; (red card) 88' Costa	Stadium: Mini Estadi; Attendance: 2,124; Referee: Adrián Cordero Vega

3 December 2017 17	Almería	3 – 1	Tenerife	Almería
20:00	Motta 11'; Alcaraz (yellow card) 65'; Muñoz 69'		72' (yellow card) 90+1' Juan Carlos; (yellow card) 90+3' Longo	Stadium: Juegos Mediterráneos; Attendance: 6,028; Referee: David Pérez Pallas

8 December 2017 18	Granada	3 – 2	Almería	Granada
18:00	Víctor Díaz 43'; Machís 48' (yellow card) 90+3'; Joselu (yellow card) 80'; Pedro 90+3'		(yellow card) 26' (goal) 63' Alcaraz; 90+1' Morcillo	Stadium: Nuevo Los Cármenes; Attendance: 12,577; Referee: José Antonio López Toca

16 December 2017 19	Almería	1 – 0	Córdoba	Almería
20:00	Motta (yellow card) 2' (goal) 85'; Joaquín (yellow card) 37'; Mandi (yellow card) 42'	Report	(yellow card) 43' Aguza; (yellow card) 84' Galán	Stadium: Juegos Mediterráneos; Attendance: 5,211; Referee: Aitor Gorostegui Fernánedz Ortega

22 December 2017 20	Alcorcón	2 – 0	Almería	Alcorcón
21:00	Dorca 1' (yellow card) 60'; Pereira 66'	Report	(yellow card) 48' Owona	Stadium: Santo Domingo; Attendance: 1,808; Referee: Dámaso Arcediano Monescillo

7 January 2018 21	Almería	1 – 0	Lugo	Almería
20:00	Motta (yellow card) 3' (yellow-red card) 90+2'; Verza (yellow card) 63'; René (yellow card) 86'; Pozo (yellow card) 87'; Alcaraz 90+1'	Report	(yellow card) 54' Iriome; (yellow card) 89' Bernardo; (penalty missed) 90+3 Fede Vico	Stadium: Juegos Mediterráneos; Attendance: 4,928; Referee: Víctor Areces Franco

13 January 2018 22	Almería	1 – 1	Gimnàstic	Almería
18:00	Navas (yellow card) 42'; Fidel 59'; Fran (yellow card) 80'; Verza (yellow card) 86' (penalty missed) 90+1'	Report	(yellow card) 73' Muñiz; 79' (o.g.) Joaquín	Stadium: Juegos Mediterráneos; Attendance: 6,154; Referee: Valentín Pizarro Gómez

20 January 2018 23	Oviedo	2 – 1	Almería	Oviedo
18:00	Carlos Hernández (yellow card) 43'; Toché 66'; Aarón (yellow card) 69'; René 72' (o.g.); Varela (yellow card) 74'	Report	(yellow card) 41' Motta; (yellow card) 52' Verza; 53' (yellow card) 84' Fidel; (yellow card) 58' Mandi; (yellow card) 74' Hicham	Stadium: Carlos Tartiere; Attendance: 14,829; Referee: Isidro Díaz de Mera Escuderos

28 January 2018 24	Almería	0 – 0	Numancia	Almería
18:00	Fidel (yellow card) 31'; Gaspar (yellow card) 53'	Report	(yellow card) 64' Etxeberría; (yellow card) 87' Nacho; (yellow card) 90+2' Mateu	Stadium: Juegos Mediterráneos; Attendance: 5,219; Referee: Adrián Cordero Vega

3 February 2018 25	Lorca	1 – 2	Almería	Lorca
20:00	Muñoz 12' (pen.) (yellow card) 67'; Pomares (yellow card) 15'; Noguera (yellow card) 52'; Nasuti (yellow card) 87'; Tropi (yellow card) 90'	Report	(yellow card) 17' Nano; 48' Caballero; (yellow card) 73' Motta; 76' Alcaraz; (yellow card) 90+1' Trujillo	Stadium: Francisco Artés Carrasco; Attendance: 4,982; Referee: David Pérez Pallas

10 February 2018 26	Almería	0 – 1	Osasuna	Almería
20:00	Sulayman (yellow card) 45'; Joaquín (yellow card) 75'	Report	50' David Rodríguez; (yellow card) 53' Lasso; (yellow card) 86' Mérida; (yellow card) 86' Roberto Torres	Stadium: Juegos Mediterráneos; Attendance: 5,586; Referee: Santiago Varón Aceitón

18 February 2018 27	Sevilla Atlético	0 – 3	Almería	Seville
12:00	Fede (yellow card) 59'; Álex Muñoz (yellow card) 67'; Matos (yellow card) 73'; Carlos Fernández (yellow card) 88'	Report	27' 64' Alcaraz; (yellow card) 60' Soleri; 79' Muñoz	Stadium: Viejo Nervión; Attendance: 993; Referee: Víctor Areces Franco

24 February 2018 28	Almería	2 – 1	Cultural Leonesa	Almería
18:00	Sulayman (yellow card) 13'; Gaspar 21'; Alcaraz 44' (pen.)		(yellow card) 14' Salvador; (yellow card) 42' Palatsí; (yellow card) 42' Isaac; 61' Samu; (yellow card) 84' David García	Stadium: Juegos Mediterráneos; Attendance: 7,056; Referee: Rubén Eiriz Mata

4 March 2018 29	Huesca	2 – 2	Almería	Huesca
20:00	Morcillo 34' (o.g.); Ávila 57' (yellow card) 61'; Pulido (red card) 72'; Iñigo López (yellow card) 79'; Melero (red card) 86'; Luso (yellow card) 90+1'		6' (yellow card) 32' (goal) 84' Soleri; (yellow card) 16' Fran; (yellow card) 29' Sulayman; (yellow card) 82' Fidel	Stadium: El Alcoraz; Attendance: 4,572; Referee: Aitor Gorostegui Fernández Ortega

10 March 2018 30	Almería	0 – 1	Rayo Vallecano	Almería
18:00	Motta (yellow card) 48'; Alcaraz (yellow card) 73'; Sulayman (yellow card) 79'; Pozo (yellow card) 90+1'; Morcillo (yellow card) 90+3'		22' (yellow card) 70' Unai López; (yellow card) 25' De Tomás; (yellow card) 58' Trejo; (yellow card) 78' Alberto; (yellow card) 53' Embarba; (yellow card) 90+2' Comesaña	Stadium: Juegos Mediterráneos; Attendance: 7,212; Referee: David Pérez Pallas

18 March 2018 31	Valladolid	2 – 1	Almería	Valladolid
12:00	Plano 60'; Mata 86'; Martínez (yellow card) 88'; Gianniotas (yellow card) 90+1'		3' (yellow card) 90+1' Sulayman; (yellow card) 54' Fran	Stadium: José Zorrilla; Attendance: 11,667; Referee: Saul Ais Reig

24 March 2018 32	Reus	1 – 0	Almería	Reus
20:00	Lekić 26'; Atienza (yellow card) 45'; Campins (yellow card) 47'; Olmo (yellow card) 49'		(yellow card) 37' Alcaraz; (yellow card) 50' Motta	Stadium: Municipal; Attendance: 3,420; Referee: Jorge Valdés Aller

1 April 2018 33	Almería	1 – 3	Sporting Gijón	Almería
18:00	Alcaraz (yellow card) 30' (goal) 90+2' (pen.); Estupiñán (yellow card) 31'; Pozo (yellow card) 66'; Morcillo (yellow card) 70'; Bangoura (yellow card) 80'		10' (yellow card) 36' Santos; (yellow card) 23' Canella; 79' Hernán; (yellow card) 86' Sergio Álvarez; 90' Jony; (yellow card) 90+2' Álex Pérez	Stadium: Juegos Mediterráneos; Attendance: 7,566; Referee: Isidro Díaz de Mera

6 April 2018 34	Cádiz	0 – 0	Almería	Cádiz
21:00	Eugeni (yellow card) 18'		(yellow card) 23' Gaspar; (yellow card) 38' Nano; (yellow card) 75' Trujillo	Stadium: Ramón de Carranza; Attendance: 13,619; Referee: Gorka Sagues Oscoz

15 April 2018 35	Almería	1 – 1	Albacete	Almería
16:00	Motta 84'		22' Aridane	Stadium: Juegos Mediterráneos; Attendance: 6,969; Referee: Juan Luis Pulido Santana

21 April 2018 36	Zaragoza	2 – 1	Almería	Zaragoza
16:00	Papunashvili 56'; Febas (yellow card) 80'; Zapater (yellow card) 84'; Iglesias 85'		(yellow card) 70' Motta; (yellow card) 81' Joaquín; 90+3' Caballero	Stadium: La Romareda; Attendance: 20,820; Referee: Daniel Ocón Arráiz

28 April 2018 37	Almería	1 – 0	Barcelona B	Almería
16:00	Estupiñán (yellow card) 50'; Joaquín (yellow card) 62'; Hicham 66'; Bangoura (yellow card) 87'		(yellow card) 76' Monchu; (yellow card) 76' Rivera; (yellow card) 78' Cardona; (yellow card) 90+2' Cuenca	Stadium: Juegos Mediterráneos; Attendance: 10,544; Referee: Víctor Areces Franco

5 May 2018 38	Tenerife	0 – 0	Almería	Santa Cruz de Tenerife
20:00	Alberto (yellow card) 25'; Casadesús (yellow card) 45+3'; Acosta (yellow card) 73' (yellow-red card) 77'		(yellow card) 45+2' Trujillo; (yellow card) 89' Verza	Stadium: Heliodoro Rodríguez López; Attendance: 11,378; Referee: Santiago Varón Aceitón

13 May 2018 39	Almería	2 – 0	Granada	Almería
20:00	Sulayman (yellow card) 39'; Muñoz 41' 90+3'; Motta (yellow card) 69'; Morcillo (yellow card) 90+4'		(yellow card) 13' Saunier; (yellow card) 46' Baena; (yellow card) 83' Montoro	Stadium: Juegos Mediterráneos; Attendance: 9,466; Referee: Gorka Sagues Oscoz

20 May 2018 40	Córdoba	2 – 0	Almería	Córdoba
20:00	Reyes (yellow card) 22'; René 25' (o.g.); Aythami (yellow card) 60'; Vallejo (yellow card) 85'; Ramos (yellow card) 90+1'; Araújo 90+3'		(yellow card) 16' Alcaraz; (yellow card) 28' Motta; (yellow card) 51' (yellow-red card) 73' Sulayman; (yellow card) 63' Pozo	Stadium: Nuevo Arcángel; Attendance: 18,933; Referee: Juan Luis Pulido Santana

27 May 2018 41	Almería	0 – 0	Alcorcón	Almería
20:30	Motta (yellow card) 38'		(yellow card) 71' Toribio; (yellow card) 90+3' Casto	Stadium: Juegos Mediterráneos; Attendance: 11,789; Referee: Eduardo Prieto Iglesias

2 June 2018 42	Lugo	1 – 1	Almería	Lugo
20:30	Seoane (yellow card) 37'; Pita 65' (pen.)		(yellow card) 19' Morcillo; (yellow card) 50' Nano; (yellow card) 62' Owona; (yellow card) 64' René; 69' Fidel	Stadium: Anxo Carro; Attendance: 2,960; Referee: Adrián Cordero Vega

=== Copa del Rey ===
5 September 2017 1st round	Cádiz	1 – 0	Almería	Cádiz
18:45	Barral 23' (yellow card) 24'; Rober (yellow card) 55'; Kecojević (yellow card) 79'		(yellow card) 58' Costa	Stadium: Ramón de Carranza; Referee: Dámaso Arcediano Monescillo
