= Folgoso =

Folgoso is a surname. Notable people with the surname include:

- Alfonso Falero Folgoso (born 1959), Spanish japanologist
- Óscar Lozano Folgoso (born 1996), Spanish footballer
