= 2019–20 Real Valladolid season =

Real Valladolid
2019–20 season
- President: Ronaldo
- Head coach: Sergio González
- Stadium: Estadio José Zorrilla
- La Liga: 13th
- Copa del Rey: Round of 32
- Top goalscorer: League: Sergi Guardiola (7); All: Enes Ünal (8)
- Highest home attendance: 23,680 (vs Atlético Madrid, 6 October 2019)
- Lowest home attendance: 16,333 (vs Valencia, 21 December 2019)
- Average home league attendance: 19,892
- Biggest win: Valladolid 3–0 Mallorca; Tolosa 0–3 Valladolid
- Biggest defeat: Barcelona 5–1 Valladolid
Home colours	Away colours	Third colours

The 2019–20 season was Real Valladolid's 89th season in existence and the club's second consecutive season in the top flight of Spanish football and the 43rd season in La Liga. In addition to the domestic league, Valladolid participated in this season's edition of the Copa del Rey. The season was slated to cover a period from 1 July 2019 to 30 June 2020. It was extended extraordinarily beyond 30 June due to the COVID-19 pandemic in Spain.

== Players ==
=== First-team squad ===
As of 16 June 2020.

Note: Flags indicate national team as defined under FIFA eligibility rules; some limited exceptions apply. Players may hold more than one non-FIFA nationality.

No.	Pos.	Nation	Player
1	GK	ESP	Jordi Masip (3rd captain)
2	DF	ESP	Pedro Porro (on loan from Manchester City)
3	MF	FRA	Hatem Ben Arfa
4	DF	ESP	Kiko
5	DF	ESP	Javi Sánchez
6	DF	ESP	Raúl García (on loan from Getafe)
7	FW	ESP	Sergi Guardiola
8	MF	BRA	Matheus Fernandes (on loan from Palmeiras)
9	FW	TUR	Enes Ünal (on loan from Villarreal)
10	FW	ESP	Óscar Plano
11	MF	ESP	Pablo Hervías
13	GK	ESP	Churripi

No.	Pos.	Nation	Player
14	MF	ESP	Rubén Alcaraz
16	MF	ESP	Fede San Emeterio
17	DF	ESP	Javi Moyano (captain)
18	DF	ESP	Antoñito
19	MF	ESP	Toni Villa
20	FW	ESP	Sandro (on loan from Everton)
21	MF	ESP	Míchel (Vice-captain)
22	DF	ESP	Nacho
23	FW	ESP	Waldo Rubio
24	DF	ESP	Joaquín
27	DF	GHA	Mohammed Salisu
31	FW	ECU	Stiven Plaza

=== Out on loan ===
Note: Flags indicate national team as defined under FIFA eligibility rules; some limited exceptions apply. Players may hold more than one non-FIFA nationality.

No.	Pos.	Nation	Player
—	DF	ESP	Moisés Delgado (at Racing Santander until 30 June 2020)
—	MF	ESP	Álvaro Aguado (at Numancia until 30 June 2020)
—	MF	MAR	Anuar Tuhami (at Panathinaikos until 30 June 2020)
—	MF	MTN	El Hacen (at Lugo until 30 June 2020)

No.	Pos.	Nation	Player
—	MF	ESP	Luismi (at Oviedo until 30 June 2020)
—	FW	ESP	Chris Ramos (at Badajoz until 30 June 2020)
—	FW	BRA	Marcos André (at Mirandés until 30 June 2020)
—	FW	SEN	Sekou Gassama (at Fuenlabrada until 30 June 2020)

== Transfers ==
=== In ===
Date	Player	From	Type	Fee	Ref
30 June 2019	(Spain) Álvaro Aguado	Córdoba	Loan return		
30 June 2019	(Spain) Churripi	Albacete	Loan return		
30 June 2019	(Spain) Antonio Domínguez	Sabadell	Loan return		
30 June 2019	(Spain) David Mayoral	Alcorcón	Loan return		
30 June 2019	(Spain) Chris Ramos	Sevilla Atlético	Loan return		
30 June 2019	(Spain) Fede San Emeterio	Granada	Loan return		
1 July 2019	(Spain) Jorge de Frutos	Real Madrid Castilla	Loan		
1 July 2019	(Spain) Pablo Hervías	Eibar	Buyout clause	€1M	
2 July 2019	(Spain) Sandro Ramírez	(England) Everton	Loan		
6 July 2019	(Italy) Federico Barba	(Italy) Chievo	Loan		
12 August 2019	(Spain) Pedro Porro	(England) Manchester City	Loan		
13 August 2019	(Ukraine) Andriy Lunin	Real Madrid	Loan		

=== Out ===
Date	Player	To	Type	Fee	Ref
30 June 2019	(Croatia) Duje Čop	(Belgium) Standard Liège	Loan return		
30 June 2019	(Spain) Borja Fernández	Retired			
30 June 2019	(Spain) Keko	Málaga	Loan return		
30 June 2019	(Italy) Daniele Verde	(Italy) Roma	Loan return		
30 June 2019	(Spain) Yoel	Eibar	Loan return		
11 July 2019	(Spain) Moi	Racing Santander	Loan		
25 July 2019	(Spain) Antonio Domínguez	Algeciras	Transfer	Free	
9 August 2019	(Spain) Fernando Calero	Espanyol	Transfer	€8M	
16 August 2019	(Spain) Churripi	Ponferradina	Loan		
17 August 2019	(Spain) David Mayoral	UCAM Murcia	Transfer	Free	
2 September 2019	(Spain) Chris Ramos	Badajoz	Loan return		

== Pre-season and friendlies ==
Win Draw Loss

16 July 2019 Friendly	San Jose Earthquakes	1–1	Valladolid	San Jose, United States
19:15 PT (UTC−7)	Affolter (yellow card) 25'; Cummings (yellow card) 33'; Wondolowski 60'	Report	De Frutos (yellow card) 26'; Sandro 34'	Stadium: Avaya Stadium; Attendance: 10,729

20 July 2019 Friendly	Cardiff City	1–1 (4–2 p)	Valladolid	Edmonton, Canada
20:30 MDT (UTC−6)	Barba 60'		Bogle 41'	Stadium: Commonwealth Stadium

27 July 2019 Friendly	Valladolid	1–0	Racing Santander	Medina de Rioseco, Spain
19:45 CEST (UTC+2)	Plano 79'			Stadium: Estadio Juan Carlos Navarro

2 August 2019 Friendly	Granada	2–1	Valladolid	San Pedro de Alcántara, Spain
19:30 CEST (UTC+2)	Soldado 13'; Puertas 27'	Report	Plano 45+1'	Stadium: Marbella Football Center; Referee: Gutiérrez Pérez

4 August 2019 Friendly	Mallorca	2–2	Valladolid	Marbella, Spain
19:00 CEST (UTC+2)	Budimir 44'; Junior 71' (pen.)	Report	Alende 11'; Guardiola 26'	Stadium: Campo La Quinta; Referee: Durán García

8 August 2019 Friendly	Valladolid	2–0	Sporting de Gijón	Palencia, Spain
20:00 CEST (UTC+2)	Ünal 47'; Waldo 65'	Report		Stadium: Estadio Nueva Balastera; Referee: Diego Calvo

10 August 2019 Friendly	Brescia	2–1	Valladolid	Mantua, Italy
18:00 CEST (UTC+2)	Torregrossa 30'; Morosini 90+3'	Report	Sandro 18'	Stadium: Stadio Danilo Martelli; Referee: Daniele Chiffi

10 October 2019 Friendly	Valladolid	3–2	Salamanca	Valladolid, Spain
11:00 CEST (UTC+2)	Plano 31', 36'; Anuar 77'	Report	Galván 52'; Navarro 80'	Stadium: Campo 1 Anexos del José Zorrilla hierba natural Referee: Martínez Arranz

14 November 2019 XLV Trofeo Ciudad de Valladolid	Valladolid	1–0	Gaz Metan Mediaș	Valladolid, Spain
20:00 CET (UTC+1)	Toni 31'	Report		Stadium: Estadio José Zorrilla; Referee: González González

== Competitions ==
=== Overview ===
Competition	First match	Last match	Starting round	Final position	Record							
Competition	First match	Last match	Starting round	Final position	Pld	W	D	L	GF	GA	GD	Win %
La Liga	18 August 2019	19 July 2020	Matchday 1	13th	38	9	15	14	32	43	−11	23.68
Copa del Rey	18 December 2019	22 January 2020	First round	Round of 32	3	1	1	1	5	3	+2	33.33
Total					41	10	16	15	37	46	−9	24.39

Last updated: 19 July 2020
Source: Soccerway

=== La Liga ===
==== League table ====
Pos	Team	Pld	W	D	L	GF	GA	GD	Pts
11	Athletic Bilbao	38	13	12	13	41	38	+3	51
12	Levante	38	14	7	17	47	53	−6	49
13	Valladolid	38	9	15	14	32	43	−11	42
14	Eibar	38	11	9	18	39	56	−17	42
15	Real Betis	38	10	11	17	48	60	−12	41

Source: La Liga, Soccerway
Rules for classification: 1) Points; 2) Head-to-head points; 3) Head-to-head goal difference; 4) Goal difference; 5) Goals scored; 6) Fair-play points (Note: Head-to-head record is used only after all the matches between the teams in question have been played)

==== Results summary ====
Overall								Home						Away					
Pld	W	D	L	GF	GA	GD	Pts	W	D	L	GF	GA	GD	W	D	L	GF	GA	GD
38	9	15	14	32	43	−11	42	5	10	4	18	15	+3	4	5	10	14	28	−14

Last updated: 19 July 2020.
Source: La Liga

==== Results by round ====
Round	1	2	3	4	5	6	7	8	9	10	11	12	13	14	15	16	17	18	19	20	21	22	23	24	25	26	27	28	29	30	31	32	33	34	35	36	37	38
Ground	A	A	A	H	A	H	A	H	A	H	A	H	A	H	A	H	A	H	H	A	H	A	H	A	H	A	H	A	H	A	H	A	H	H	A	H	A	H
Result	W	D	L	D	L	D	W	D	D	W	L	W	L	L	D	D	L	D	D	D	L	W	D	L	W	L	L	W	D	L	D	D	D	W	L	L	L	W
Position	3	4	11	12	15	14	10	13	12	9	13	12	13	14	15	14	15	14	14	15	16	14	15	15	15	15	15	15	15	15	15	14	14	13	14	14	16	13

Updated to match(es) played on 19 July 2020. Source: La Liga
A = Away; H = Home; W = Win; D = Draw; L = Loss

==== Matches ====
The La Liga schedule was announced on 4 July 2019.

18 August 2019 1	Real Betis	1–2	Valladolid	Seville
21:00 CEST (UTC+2)	Robles (red card) 8'; Emerson (yellow card) 27'; Loren 68'; Pedraza (yellow card) 90+2'	Report	Plano (yellow card) 36', (goal) 89'; Antoñito (yellow card) 40'; Alcaraz (yellow card) 45'; Moyano (yellow card) 59'; Guardiola 63'; Míchel (yellow card) 90+2'; Anuar (yellow card) 90+3'	Stadium: Estadio Benito Villamarín; Attendance: 49,554; Referee: Santiago Jaime Latre

24 August 2019 2	Real Madrid	1–1	Valladolid	Madrid
19:00 CEST (UTC+2)	Kroos (yellow card) 73'; Benzema 82'; Casemiro (yellow card) 90+2'	Report	Fede (yellow card) 33'; Guardiola 88'; Rubio (yellow card) 90+5'	Stadium: Santiago Bernabéu; Attendance: 62,444; Referee: Pablo González Fuertes

31 August 2019 3	Levante	2–0	Valladolid	Valencia
19:00 CEST (UTC+2)	Postigo (yellow card) 69'; Vukčević (yellow card) 75'; León 83'; Morales 90+3'	Report	Míchel (yellow card) 63'; Guardiola (yellow card) 75'	Stadium: Ciutat de València; Attendance: 18,504; Referee: Adrián Cordero Vega

15 September 2019 4	Valladolid	1–1	Osasuna	Valladolid
18:30 CEST (UTC+2)	Hervías 65'	Report	Mérida (yellow card) 77'; Rober 81'	Stadium: Estadio José Zorrilla; Attendance: 20,705; Referee: José Luis Munuera Montero

21 September 2019 5	Villarreal	2–0	Valladolid	Villarreal
13:00 CEST (UTC+2)	Quintillà (yellow card) 40'; Iborra (yellow card) 45+3'; Cazorla 77' (pen.); Ontiveros 89'	Report	Barba (yellow card) 60'	Stadium: Estadio de la Cerámica; Attendance: 16,135; Referee: César Soto Grado

24 September 2019 6	Valladolid	1–1	Granada	Valladolid
19:00 CEST (UTC+2)	Alcaraz (yellow card) 6'; Plano 12'; Sandro (yellow card) 35'; Kiko (yellow card) 71'	Report	Fernández 42'; Herrera (yellow card) 77'; Germán (yellow card) 90'	Stadium: Estadio José Zorrilla; Attendance: 18,595; Referee: Valentín Pizarro Gómez

29 September 2019 7	Espanyol	0–2	Valladolid	Cornellà de Llobregat
12:00 CEST (UTC+2)	Sánchez (yellow card) 23'; López (yellow card) 35'; Calero (red card) 65'	Report	Míchel 25' (pen.); Plano 90+4'	Stadium: RCDE Stadium; Attendance: 20,269; Referee: Guillermo Cuadra Fernández

6 October 2019 8	Valladolid	0–0	Atlético Madrid	Valladolid
16:00 CEST (UTC+2)	Nacho (yellow card) 2'; Toni (yellow card) 10'; Moyano (yellow card) 29'; Plano (yellow card) 48'; Joaquín (yellow card) 52'; Rubio (yellow card) 75'	Report	Morata (yellow card) 25'; Saúl (yellow card) 45+2'; Félix (yellow card) 60'; Lemar (yellow card) 89'	Stadium: Estadio José Zorrilla; Attendance: 23,680; Referee: José María Sánchez Martínez

20 October 2019 9	Athletic Bilbao	1–1	Valladolid	Bilbao
18:30 CEST (UTC+2)	Williams 33'; Yeray (yellow card) 58'; Aduriz (yellow card) 79'	Report	Salisu (yellow card) 38'; Martínez 71' (o.g.); Joaquín (yellow card) 75'; Masip (yellow card) 90'	Stadium: San Mamés; Attendance: 37,107; Referee: Jesús Gil Manzano

26 October 2019 10	Valladolid	2–0	Eibar	Valladolid
18:30 CEST (UTC+2)	Guardiola 10'; Salisu 39', (yellow card) 78'	Report	Orellana (yellow card) 32'; Diop (yellow card) 60'	Stadium: Estadio José Zorrilla; Attendance: 20,036; Referee: José Luis Munuera Montero

29 October 2019 11	Barcelona	5–1	Valladolid	Barcelona
21:15 CET (UTC+1)	Lenglet 2'; Vidal 29'; Messi 34', 75'; Suárez 77'	Report	Kiko 15'; Joaquín (yellow card) 45'; Guardiola (yellow card) 68'; Míchel (yellow card) 79'	Stadium: Camp Nou; Attendance: 59,896; Referee: Javier Alberola Rojas

3 November 2019 12	Valladolid	3–0	Mallorca	Valladolid
12:00 CET (UTC+1)	Joaquín 40', (yellow card) 63'; Míchel (yellow card) 45+1'; Ünal 50' (pen.), (yellow card) 77'; Sandro (yellow card) 66', (goal) 90+4'; Salisu (yellow card) 86'; Alcaraz (yellow card) 87'	Report	Sevilla (yellow card) 55'; Valjent (yellow card) 77'; Sastre (yellow card) 89'; Febas (yellow card) 90+3'	Stadium: Estadio José Zorrilla; Attendance: 18,419; Referee: David Medié Jiménez

9 November 2019 13	Alavés	3–0	Valladolid	Vitoria-Gasteiz
13:00 CET (UTC+1)	Laguardia (yellow card) 6'; Joselu 26'; Pina 32'; García (yellow card) 33'; Rioja (yellow card) 59'; Pérez 75' (pen.)	Report	Barba (yellow card) 31'; Alcaraz (yellow card) 75'; Porro (yellow card) 85'	Stadium: Mendizorrotza Stadium; Attendance: 16,148; Referee: Mario Melero López

24 November 2019 14	Valladolid	0–1	Sevilla	Valladolid
21:00 CET (UTC+1)	Masip (yellow card) 12'; Nacho (yellow card) 15'; Toni (yellow card) 89'	Report	Banega 13' (pen.); Ocampos (yellow card) 15' (yellow-red card) 90+1'; De Jong (yellow card) 64'; Fernando (yellow card) 89'	Stadium: Estadio José Zorrilla; Attendance: 18,169; Referee: Eduardo Prieto Iglesias

29 November 2019 15	Celta Vigo	0–0	Valladolid	Vigo
21:00 CET (UTC+1)	Mallo (yellow card) 49'	Report	Joaquín (yellow card) 45'; Guardiola (yellow card) 66'; Rubio (yellow card) 90+1'	Stadium: Abanca-Balaídos; Attendance: 16,918; Referee: Javier Alberola Rojas

8 December 2019 16	Valladolid	0–0	Real Sociedad	Valladolid
16:00 CET (UTC+1)		Report	Le Normand (yellow card) 20'; Oyarzabal (yellow card) 68'; Isak (yellow card) 76'; Llorente (yellow card) 81'	Stadium: Estadio José Zorrilla; Attendance: 18,654; Referee: Pablo González Fuertes

15 December 2019 17	Getafe	2–0	Valladolid	Getafe
12:00 CET (UTC+1)	Cucurella (yellow card) 17', (goal) 36'; Suárez (yellow card) 32'; Portillo (yellow card) 68'; Ángel 82'	Report	Barba (yellow card) 8'; Fernández (yellow card) 30'; Alcaraz (yellow card) 62'	Stadium: Coliseum Alfonso Pérez; Attendance: 7,094; Referee: Antonio Mateu Lahoz

21 December 2019 18	Valladolid	1–1	Valencia	Valladolid
21:00 CET (UTC+1)	Guardiola 83'	Report	Soler (yellow card) 34'; Coquelin (yellow card) 81'; Parejo (yellow card) 90'; Vallejo 90+4'	Stadium: Estadio José Zorrilla; Attendance: 16,333; Referee: Valentín Pizarro Gómez

3 January 2020 19	Valladolid	2–2	Leganés	Valladolid
19:00 CET (UTC+1)	Ünal 8', 79', (yellow card) 90'; Alcaraz (yellow card) 68'; Guardiola (yellow card) 86'	Report	Braithwaite 4'; Silva (yellow card) 7'; Mesa 13', (yellow card) 58'	Stadium: Estadio José Zorrilla; Attendance: 21,492; Referee: Juan Martínez Munuera

18 January 2020 20	Osasuna	0–0	Valladolid	Pamplona
18:30 CET (UTC+1)	Aridane (yellow card) 73'; R. García (yellow card) 78'	Report	Alcaraz (yellow card) 35'; Fede (yellow card) 65'	Stadium: El Sadar; Attendance: 15,382; Referee: Javier Alberola Rojas

26 January 2020 21	Valladolid	0–1	Real Madrid	Valladolid
21:00 CET (UTC+1)	Joaquín (yellow card) 10'	Report	Varane (yellow card) 36'; Modrić (yellow card) 57'; Nacho (yellow card) 76', (goal) 78'	Stadium: Estadio José Zorrilla; Attendance: 23,417; Referee: Ricardo de Burgos Bengoetxea

1 February 2020 22	Mallorca	0–1	Valladolid	Palma
18:30 CET (UTC+1)	Budimir (yellow card) 17'; Rodríguez (yellow card) 25'; Reina (yellow card) 29'; Hernández (yellow card) 67'	Report	Ünal 56'; Toni (yellow card) 66'	Stadium: Son Moix; Attendance: 13,891; Referee: David Medié Jiménez

8 February 2020 23	Valladolid	1–1	Villarreal	Valladolid
18:30 CET (UTC+1)	Alcaraz 15'; Toni (yellow card) 58'; Moyano (yellow card) 58'; García (yellow card) 78'	Report	Albiol (yellow card) 41'; Gerard 54'; Iborra (yellow card) 60'; Peña (yellow card) 71'	Stadium: Estadio José Zorrilla; Attendance: 19,557; Referee: Alejandro Hernández Hernández

15 February 2020 24	Granada	2–1	Valladolid	Granada
21:00 CET (UTC+1)	Foulquier (yellow card) 16'; Fernández (yellow card) 31', (goal) 90+6'; Puertas 81'	Report	Fede (yellow card) 11'; Plano (yellow card) 45'; Guardiola 56'	Stadium: Nuevo Los Cármenes; Attendance: 15,782; Referee: Juan Martínez Munuera

23 February 2020 25	Valladolid	2–1	Espanyol	Valladolid
16:00 CET (UTC+1)	Sandro 77'; Guardiola 83'; García (yellow card) 88'	Report	Da. López (yellow card) 16' (yellow-red card) 25'; Roca (yellow card) 36'; Embarba (yellow card) 79', (goal) 90+3' (pen.); Darder (yellow card) 88'	Stadium: Estadio José Zorrilla; Attendance: 19,645; Referee: Eduardo Prieto Iglesias

28 February 2020 26	Real Sociedad	1–0	Valladolid	San Sebastián
21:00 CET (UTC+1)	Elustondo (yellow card) 28'; Januzaj 60'	Report	Guardiola (yellow card) 70'	Stadium: Anoeta; Attendance: 30,611; Referee: Valentín Pizarro Gómez

8 March 2020 27	Valladolid	1–4	Athletic Bilbao	Valladolid
14:00 CET (UTC+1)	Sandro 76'; Ben Arfa (yellow card) 90'	Report	López 4', (yellow card) 49'; R. García 24', (yellow card) 80'; Williams 87'; Córdoba 90+3'	Stadium: Estadio José Zorrilla; Attendance: 21,632; Referee: José Luis Munuera Montero

13 June 2020 28	Leganés	1–2	Valladolid	Leganés
19:30 CEST (UTC+2)	Óscar 83' (pen.)	Report	Ünal 2'; Guardiola (yellow card) 29'; Plano (yellow card) 40'; Alcaraz 54'; Salisu (yellow card) 83'; Fede (yellow card) 89'	Stadium: Estadio Municipal de Butarque; Attendance: 0 Referee: Mario Melero López
Note: The match was originally scheduled for 14 March, but was postponed due to the COVID-19 pandemic. and rescheduled to 13 June. It was played behind closed doors.

17 June 2020 29	Valladolid	0–0	Celta Vigo	Valladolid
19:30 CEST (UTC+2)	Joaquín (yellow card) 50'; Alcaraz (yellow card) 59'; Rubio (yellow card) 90+1'	Report	Yokuşlu (yellow card) 31'; Smolov (yellow card) 35'; Murillo (yellow card) 61'	Stadium: Estadio José Zorrilla; Attendance: 0 Referee: Jesús Gil Manzano
Note: The match was originally scheduled for 21 March, but was postponed due to the 2020 coronavirus pandemic, and rescheduled to 17 June. It was played behind closed doors.

20 June 2020 30	Atlético Madrid	1–0	Valladolid	Madrid
22:00 CEST (UTC+2)	Partey (yellow card) 57'; Hermoso (yellow card) 59'; Carrasco (yellow card) 69'; Costa (yellow card) 75'; Vitolo 81'	Report	Rubio (yellow card) 64'; Míchel (yellow card) 88'	Stadium: Wanda Metropolitano; Attendance: 0 Referee: Pablo González Fuertes
Note: The match was originally scheduled for 5 April, but was postponed due to the 2020 coronavirus pandemic, and rescheduled to 20 June. It was played behind closed doors.

23 June 2020 31	Valladolid	1–1	Getafe	Valladolid
19:30 CEST (UTC+2)	Ünal (yellow card) 22', (goal) 45+5' (pen.); Salisu (yellow card) 49'; Joaquín (yellow card) 57'; Alcaraz (yellow card) 85'; Kiko (yellow card) 90+6'	Report	Nyom (yellow card) 23'; Mata 41'; Djené (yellow card) 45+3'	Stadium: Estadio José Zorrilla; Attendance: 0 Referee: César Soto Grado
Note: The match was originally scheduled for 12 April, but was postponed due to the 2020 coronavirus pandemic, and rescheduled to 23 June. It was played behind closed doors.

26 June 2020 32	Sevilla	1–1	Valladolid	Seville
22:00 CEST (UTC+2)	Fernando (yellow card) 12'; Koundé (yellow card) 58'; Vázquez (yellow card) 60'; Ocampos 83' (pen.)	Report	Kiko 25'; Hervías (yellow card) 71'; Sánchez (yellow card) 82'	Stadium: Ramón Sánchez Pizjuán Stadium; Attendance: 0 Referee: Valentín Pizarro Gómez
Note: The match was originally scheduled for 22 April, but was postponed due to the 2020 coronavirus pandemic, and rescheduled to 26 June. It was played behind closed doors.

1 July 2020 33	Valladolid	0–0	Levante	Valladolid
22:00 CEST (UTC+2)	Rubio (yellow card) 29'; Míchel (yellow card) 45+3'	Report	Bardhi (yellow card) 16'	Stadium: Estadio José Zorrilla; Attendance: 0 Referee: David Medié Jiménez
Note: The match was originally scheduled for 26 April, but was postponed due to the 2020 coronavirus pandemic, and rescheduled to 1 July. It was played behind closed doors.

4 July 2020 34	Valladolid	1–0	Alavés	Valladolid
19:30 CEST (UTC+2)	Miguel (yellow card) 28'; Joaquín 88'; Plano (yellow card) 90'; Ünal (yellow card) 90+5'	Report	Fejsa (yellow card) 33'; Pina (yellow card) 39'	Stadium: Estadio José Zorrilla; Attendance: 0 Referee: Santiago Jaime Latre
Note: The match was originally scheduled for 3 May, but was postponed due to the 2020 coronavirus pandemic, and rescheduled to 4 July. It was played behind closed doors.

7 July 2020 35	Valencia	2–1	Valladolid	Valencia
19:30 CEST (UTC+2)	Gómez 30'; Guerrero (yellow card) 72'; Kondogbia (yellow card) 75'; Lee Kang-in 89'; Guedes (yellow card) 90+2'	Report	García 47'	Stadium: Mestalla; Attendance: 0 Referee: Ricardo de Burgos Bengoetxea
Note: The match was originally scheduled for 10 May, but was postponed due to the 2020 coronavirus pandemic, and rescheduled to 7 July. It was played behind closed doors.

11 July 2020 36	Valladolid	0–1	Barcelona	Valladolid
19:30 CEST (UTC+2)	Alcaraz (yellow card) 45'; Pérez (yellow card) 65'	Report	Vidal 15'; Lenglet (yellow card) 40'; Busquets (yellow card) 60'; Alba (yellow card) 78'	Stadium: Estadio José Zorrilla; Attendance: 0 Referee: Antonio Mateu Lahoz
Note: The match was originally scheduled for 13 May, but was postponed due to the 2020 coronavirus pandemic, and rescheduled to 11 July. It was played behind closed doors.

16 July 2020 37	Eibar	3–1	Valladolid	Eibar
18:30 CEST (UTC+2)	Rafa (yellow card) 17'; Bigas 21'; Álvarez (yellow card) 24'; Inui 28'; Burgos (yellow card) 68'; De Blasis 90+2' (pen.), (yellow card) 90+4'	Report	Guardiola 71'	Stadium: Ipurua Municipal Stadium; Attendance: 0 Referee: César Soto Grado
Note: The match was originally scheduled for 17 May, but was postponed due to the 2020 coronavirus pandemic, and rescheduled to 16 July. It was played behind closed doors.

19 July 2020 38	Valladolid	2–0	Real Betis	Valladolid
18:30 CEST (UTC+2)	Guardiola 45+1'; Plano 63', (yellow card) 88'; Moyano (yellow card) 81'	Report	Bartra (yellow card) 41'; Fekir (yellow card) 85'	Stadium: Estadio José Zorrilla; Attendance: 0 Referee: Santiago Jaime Latre
Note: The match was originally scheduled for 24 May, but was postponed due to the 2020 coronavirus pandemic, and rescheduled to 19 July. It was played behind closed doors.

=== Copa del Rey ===
18 December 2019 First round	Tolosa	0–3	Valladolid	Tolosa
18:00 CET (UTC+1)	Garmendia (yellow card) 13'; Bengoetxea (yellow card) 55'; Estivariz (yellow card) 59'; Dorronso (yellow card) 72'	Report	Ünal 21'; Luismi (yellow card) 40'; Aguado 57', 65'	Stadium: Berazubi; Attendance: 2,000; Referee: Adrián Cordero Vega

11 January 2020 Second round	Marbella	1–1 (a.e.t.) (1–4 p)	Valladolid	Marbella
21:00 CET (UTC+1)	Medina (yellow card) 8'; Paulo Vitor 39', (yellow card) 107'; Pavón (yellow card) 41'; Manel (yellow card) 87'; Callejón (yellow card) 118'	Report	Míchel (yellow card) 45'; Porro (yellow card) 67'; Joaquín (yellow card) 77'; Ünal 86'; Aguado (yellow card) 113'; Corral (yellow card) 116'	Stadium: Estadio Municipal de Marbella; Attendance: 3,500; Referee: Xavier Estrada Fernández
	Penalties
	Pérez Sastre (penalty missed); Dani (penalty missed); Óscar (penalty scored)		(penalty scored) Ünal; (penalty scored) Guardiola; (penalty scored) Plano; (penalty scored) Aguado

22 January 2020 Round of 32	Tenerife	2–1	Valladolid	Santa Cruz de Tenerife
21:00 CET (UTC+1)	Joselu 67'; Gómez 86' (pen.); Sanz (yellow card) 89'	Report	Sandro 52'; Fede (yellow card) 74'; Nacho (yellow card) 89'; Sánchez (yellow card) 90+3'	Stadium: Heliodoro Rodríguez López; Attendance: 8,403; Referee: David Medié Jiménez

== Statistics ==
=== Appearances and goals ===
Last updated on the end of the season.

No.	Pos	Nat	Player	Total		La Liga		Copa del Rey	
No.	Pos	Nat	Player	Apps	Goals	Apps	Goals	Apps	Goals
Goalkeepers
1	GK	(Spain) ESP	Jordi Masip	36	0	35	0	0+1	0
13	GK	(Spain) ESP	Churripi	4	0	3	0	1	0
26	GK	(Spain) ESP	Samuel Pérez	1	0	0+1	0	0	0
Defenders
2	DF	(Spain) ESP	Pedro Porro	15	0	7+6	0	2	0
4	DF	(Spain) ESP	Kiko	35	2	33+2	2	0	0
5	DF	(Spain) ESP	Javi Sánchez	9	0	6+2	0	1	0
6	DF	(Spain) ESP	Raúl García	12	0	12	0	0	0
17	DF	(Spain) ESP	Javi Moyano	28	0	27	0	0+1	0
18	DF	(Spain) ESP	Antoñito	16	0	11+4	0	1	0
22	DF	(Spain) ESP	Nacho	24	0	21+2	0	1	0
24	DF	(Spain) ESP	Joaquín	20	2	18+1	2	1	0
27	DF	(Ghana) GHA	Mohammed Salisu	32	1	30+1	1	1	0
30	DF	(Spain) ESP	Diego Alende	1	0	0	0	1	0
34	DF	(Spain) ESP	Roberto Corral	2	0	0	0	2	0
Midfielders
3	MF	(France) FRA	Hatem Ben Arfa	5	0	2+3	0	0	0
8	MF	(Brazil) BRA	Matheus Fernandes	3	0	2+1	0	0	0
10	MF	(Spain) ESP	Óscar Plano	38	4	28+8	4	1+1	0
11	MF	(Spain) ESP	Pablo Hervías	27	1	9+16	1	2	0
14	MF	(Spain) ESP	Rubén Alcaraz	28	2	20+7	2	1	0
16	MF	(Spain) ESP	Fede San Emeterio	27	0	20+5	0	1+1	0
19	MF	(Spain) ESP	Toni	24	0	18+5	0	1	0
21	MF	(Spain) ESP	Míchel	30	1	27+2	1	1	0
23	MF	(Spain) ESP	Waldo Rubio	24	0	9+12	0	3	0
28	MF	(Spain) ESP	Kike Pérez	7	0	2+4	0	0+1	0
35	MF	(Spain) ESP	Víctor García	2	1	1+1	1	0	0
Forwards
7	FW	(Spain) ESP	Sergi Guardiola	36	8	31+4	8	0+1	0
9	FW	(Turkey) TUR	Enes Ünal	37	8	23+12	6	2	2
20	FW	(Spain) ESP	Sandro Ramírez	26	4	15+9	3	2	1
29	FW	(Spain) ESP	Miguel	9	0	2+5	0	0+2	0
31	FW	(Ecuador) ECU	Stiven Plaza	0	0	0	0	0	0
Players who have made an appearance or had a squad number this season but have left the club
3	DF	(Italy) ITA	Federico Barba	5	0	5	0	0	0
6	MF	(Spain) ESP	Luismi	1	0	0	0	1	0
8	MF	(Morocco) MAR	Anuar	12	0	1+10	0	1	0
12	MF	(Spain) ESP	Jorge de Frutos	5	0	0+3	0	1+1	0
13	GK	(Ukraine) UKR	Andriy Lunin	2	0	0	0	2	0
15	MF	(Spain) ESP	Álvaro Aguado	2	2	0	0	1+1	2
33	MF	(Mauritania) MTN	El Hacen	2	0	0	0	2	0

=== Goals ===
As of 26 June 2020

Rank	Player	Position	La Liga	Copa del Rey	Total
1	(Turkey) Enes Ünal	FW	6	2	8
2	(Spain) Sergi Guardiola	FW	6	0	6
3	(Spain) Sandro	FW	3	1	4
4	(Spain) Óscar Plano	MF	3	0	3
5	(Spain) Rubén Alcaraz	MF	2	0	2
5	(Spain) Kiko	DF	2	0	2
5	(Spain) Álvaro Aguado	MF	0	2	2
8	(Spain) Pablo Hervías	MF	1	0	1
8	(Spain) Míchel	MF	1	0	1
8	(Spain) Joaquín	DF	1	0	1
8	(Ghana) Mohammed Salisu	DF	1	0	1
Total			26	5	31
