= Falero =

Falero is a surname. Notable people with the surname include:

- Abraham Aboab Falero (died 1642), Portuguese philanthropist
- Alfonso Falero (born 1959), Spanish japanologist
- Emilio Falero (born 1947), Cuban painter
- Luis Ricardo Falero (1851–1896), Spanish painter
- Nicolás Falero (1921–1986), Uruguayan footballer
