= René Román =

Spanish footballer

René
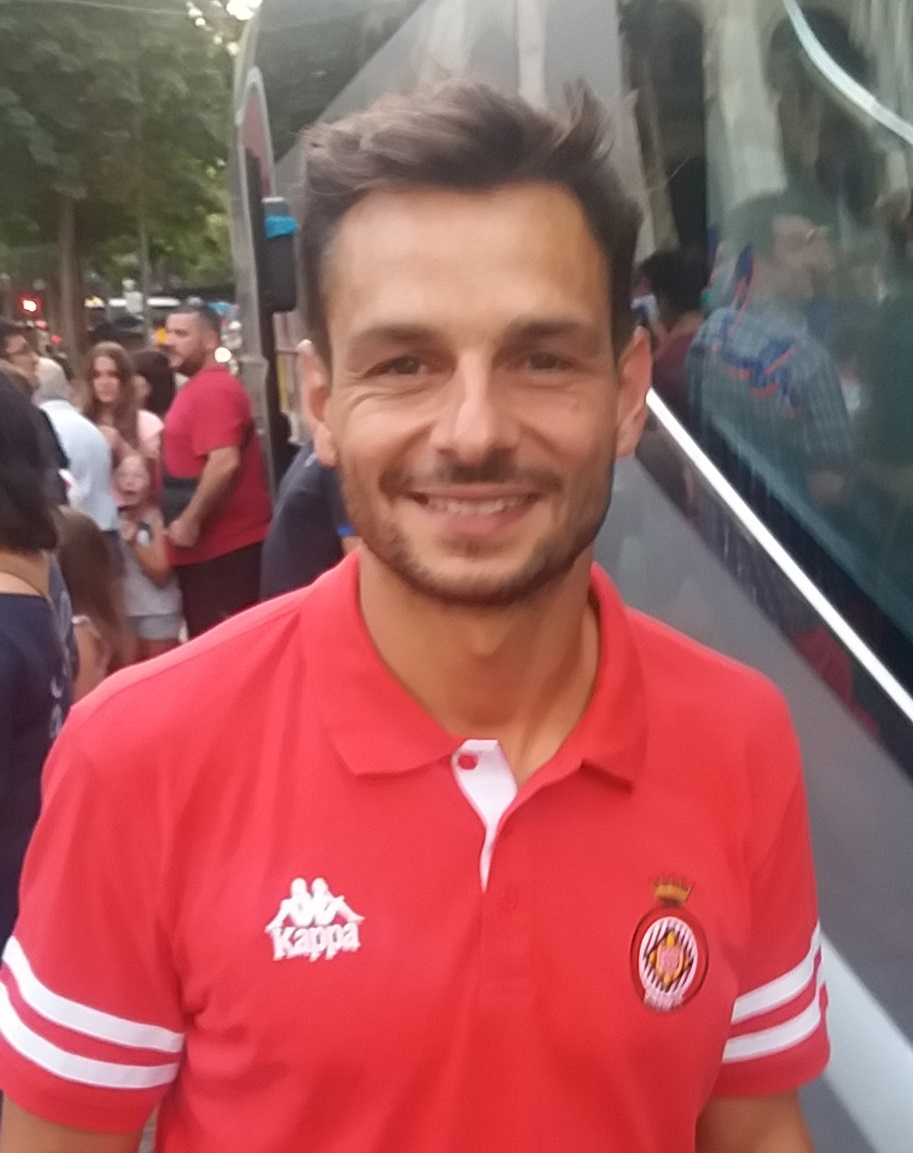
- René with Girona in 2016

Personal information
- Full name: René Román Hinojo
- Date of birth: 15 December 1983 (age 42)
- Place of birth: El Bosque, Spain
- Height: 1.83 m (6 ft 0 in)
- Position: Goalkeeper

Senior career*
Years	Team	Apps	(Gls)
2002–2006	Arcos		
2006–2007	Portuense	15	(0)
2007–2009	Betis B	49	(0)
2009–2010	Estepona	18	(0)
2010–2012	Cacereño	70	(0)
2012	Cartagena	1	(0)
2013	Barakaldo	9	(0)
2013–2014	Jaén	33	(0)
2014–2016	Llagostera	68	(0)
2016–2017	Girona	21	(0)
2017–2020	Almería	94	(0)
2020	→ Ponferradina (loan)	15	(0)
2020	Dinamo București	2	(0)
2021–2023	Atlético Baleares	54	(0)
2024	Ibiza	0	(0)
Total		449+	(0)
- * Club domestic league appearances and goals

René Román Hinojo (born 15 December 1983), known simply as René, is a Spanish former professional footballer who played as a goalkeeper.

== Club career ==
Born in El Bosque, Cádiz, René made his senior debut with local Arcos CF in the 2002–03 season. He first arrived in the Segunda División B in the summer of 2006, signing for Racing Club Portuense.

In the following years, René continued competing in the third division and his native Andalusia, representing Betis Deportivo Balompié (being named to the first team's substitutes bench on three occasions), Unión Estepona CF and CP Cacereño. In July 2012 he joined fellow third-tier FC Cartagena, being released the following month and remaining a free agent until January 2013, when he moved to Barakaldo CF.

On 21 July 2013, René joined Real Jaén, recently promoted to Segunda División. On 11 September, aged 29, he appeared in his first professional match, a 1–0 home win against CD Numancia in the second round of the Copa del Rey. He made his league debut on 20 October, in a 1–0 victory over AD Alcorcón also at the Nuevo Estadio de La Victoria.

On 16 July 2014, René moved to UE Llagostera also in division two. On 29 June 2016, after suffering relegation, he joined Girona FC of the same league after agreeing to a two-year deal.

René contributed 21 appearances during the season, sharing starting duties with Yassine Bounou as the Catalan club achieved promotion to La Liga for the first time ever. He left on 5 July 2017, and signed a two-year contract with UD Almería hours later.

On 22 May 2019, having been an undisputed first choice, René renewed his contract at the Estadio de los Juegos Mediterráneos for a further two years. The following 22 January, however, he was loaned to SD Ponferradina also of the second division for the remainder of the campaign.

René cut ties with Almería on 11 September 2020. The 36-year-old moved abroad for the first time in his career later that month, agreeing to a two-year deal at Romania's FC Dinamo București. He left in December, due to unpaid wages.

== Career statistics ==
Appearances and goals by club, season and competition
Club	Season	League			Cup		Continental		Other		Total	
Club	Season	Division	Apps	Goals	Apps	Goals	Apps	Goals	Apps	Goals	Apps	Goals
Portuense	2006–07	Segunda División B	15	0	3	0	—		—		18	0
Betis B	2007–08	Segunda División B	22	0	—		—		—		22	0
Betis B	2008–09	Segunda División B	27	0	—		—		—		27	0
Betis B	Total		49	0	—		—		—		49	0
Estepona	2009–10	Segunda División B	18	0	1	0	—		—		19	0
Cacereño	2010–11	Segunda División B	37	0	—		—		—		37	0
Cacereño	2011–12	Segunda División B	33	0	—		—		—		33	0
Cacereño	Total		70	0	—		—		—		70	0
Cartagena	2012–13	Segunda División B	1	0	—		—		—		1	0
Barakaldo	2012–13	Segunda División B	9	0	—		—		—		9	0
Jaén	2013–14	Segunda División	33	0	3	0	—		—		36	0
Llagostera	2014–15	Segunda División	33	0	0	0	—		—		33	0
Llagostera	2015–16	Segunda División	35	0	2	0	—		—		37	0
Llagostera	Total		68	0	2	0	—		—		70	0
Girona	2016–17	Segunda División	21	0	1	0	—		—		22	0
Almería	2017–18	Segunda División	42	0	0	0	—		—		42	0
Almería	2018–19	Segunda División	37	0	0	0	—		—		37	0
Almería	2019–20	Segunda División	15	0	1	0	—		—		16	0
Almería	Total		94	0	1	0	—		—		95	0
Ponferradina (loan)	2019–20	Segunda División	15	0	—		—		—		15	0
Dinamo București	2020–21	Liga I	2	0	1	0	—		—		3	0
Atlético Baleares	2020–21	Segunda División B	10	0	—		—		—		10	0
Atlético Baleares	2021–22	Primera División RFEF	33	0	0	0	—		—		33	0
Atlético Baleares	2022–23	Primera Federación	11	0	0	0	—		—		11	0
Atlético Baleares	Total		54	0	0	0	—		—		54	0
Ibiza	2023–24	Primera Federación	0	0	—		—		0	0	0	0
Career total			449	0	12	0	0	0	0	0	461	0
