= Roberto Corral =

Spanish footballer (born 1997)

Personal information
- Full name: Roberto Corral García
- Date of birth: 14 September 1997 (age 29)
- Place of birth: Valladolid, Spain
- Height: 1.82 m (6 ft 0 in)
- Position: Left-back

Team information
- Current team: Sloga Doboj
- Number: 3

Senior career*
Years	Team	Apps	(Gls)
2015–2021	Real Valladolid Promesas	101	(2)
2020–2021	→ Numancia (loan)	14	(0)
2022	Korona Kielce	19	(0)
2022	Korona Kielce II	1	(0)
2023	Metalist Kharkiv	10	(0)
2024	Sestao River	9	(0)
2024–2025	UE Santa Coloma	7	(1)
2025–2026	Rudar Prijedor	11	(0)
2026–	Sloga Doboj	7	(0)
- * Club domestic league appearances and goals as of 20 September 2026

Roberto Corral García (born 14 September 1997) is a Spanish professional footballer who plays as a left-back for Bosnian Premier League club Sloga Doboj.

== Early life ==
Corral was born in 1997 in Spain. He is a native of Valladolid, Spain. He has been a supporter of Spanish side Real Valladolid.

== Career ==
In 2022, he signed for Polish side Korona Kielce. He helped the club achieve promotion.

== Career statistics ==
As of match played 20 September 2026

Appearances and goals by club, season and competition
Club	Season	League			National cup (Note: Includes Copa del Rey, Bosnian Cup)		Other		Total	
Club	Season	Division	Apps	Goals	Apps	Goals	Apps	Goals	Apps	Goals
Real Valladolid Promesas	2015–16	Segunda División B	1	0	—		—		1	0
Real Valladolid Promesas	2016–17	Segunda División B	23	1	—		—		23	1
Real Valladolid Promesas	2017–18	Segunda División B	26	0	—		—		26	0
Real Valladolid Promesas	2018–19	Segunda División B	35	1	—		—		35	1
Real Valladolid Promesas	2019–20	Segunda División B	16	0	—		1 (Note: Appearance in the 2020 Segunda División B play-offs)	0	17	0
Real Valladolid Promesas	Total		101	2	—		1	0	102	2
Real Valladolid	2019–20	La Liga	0	0	2	0	—		2	0
Numancia (loan)	2020–21	Segunda División B	14	0	1	1	—		15	1
Korona Kielce	2021–22	I liga	14	0	—		2 (Note: Appearances in the 2021–22 I liga promotion play-offs)	1	16	1
Korona Kielce	2022–23	Ekstraklasa	5	0	—		—		5	0
Korona Kielce	Total		19	0	—		2	1	21	1
Korona Kielce II	2022–23	III liga	1	0	—		—		1	0
Metalist Kharkiv	2022–23	Ukrainian Premier League	10	0	—		—		10	0
Sestao River	2023–24	Primera Federación	9	0	—		—		9	0
UE Santa Coloma	2024–25	Primera Divisió	7	1	—		—		7	1
Rudar Prijedor	2025–26	Bosnian Premier League	11	0	1	0	—		12	0
Sloga Doboj	2026–27	Bosnian Premier League	7	0	0	0	—		7	0
Career total			179	3	4	1	3	1	186	5
