= Huércal de Almería =

Huércal de Almería, Spain
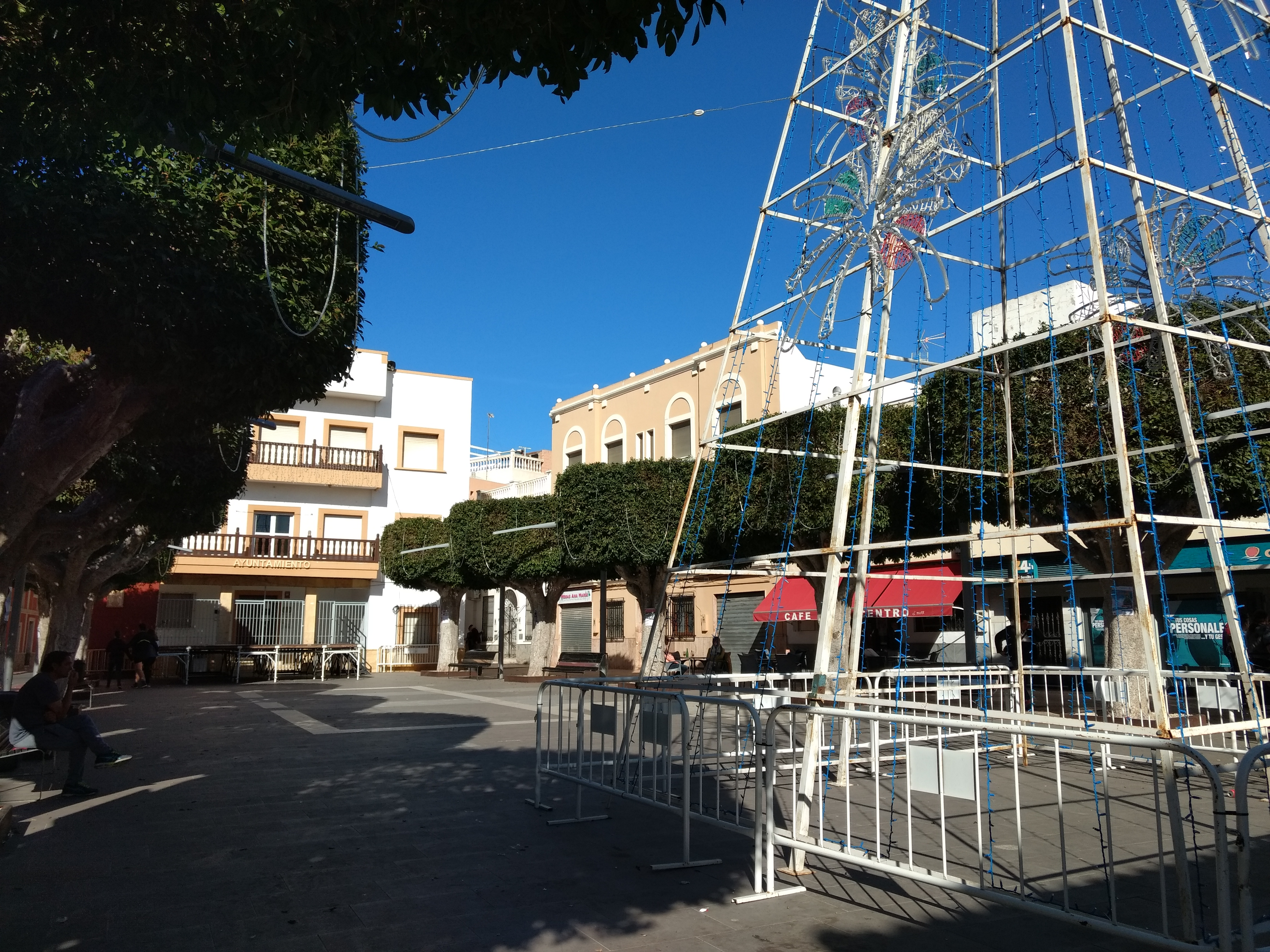

- Flag Coat of arms

- Location within Province of Almería Location within Andalusia Location within Spain
- Coordinates: 36°53′N 2°26′W
- Country: Spain
- Community: Andalusia
- Municipality: Almería

Government
  - Mayor: Juan Ibáñez (IU)

Area
  - Total: 21 km^{2} (8.1 sq mi)
- Elevation: 94 m (308 ft)

Population (2025-01-01)
  - Total: 18,660
  - Density: 890/km^{2} (2,300/sq mi)
- Time zone: UTC+1 (CET)
  - Summer (DST): UTC+2 (CEST)

Huércal de Almería is a municipality of Almería province, in the autonomous community of Andalusia, Spain.

== Demographics ==
Historical population
Year	Pop.	±%
1999	6,395	—
2000	6,766	+5.8%
2001	7,568	+11.9%
2002	8,283	+9.4%
2003	9,298	+12.3%
2004	10,242	+10.2%
2005	11,128	+8.7%
Source: INE (Spain)

== Notable people ==
- Joaquín Fernández (born 1996), footballer

== See also ==
- List of municipalities in Almería
