= Óscar Lozano (footballer) =

Spanish footballer

Personal information
- Full name: Óscar Lozano Folgoso
- Date of birth: 14 June 1996 (age 30)
- Place of birth: Motril, Spain
- Height: 1.70 m (5 ft 7 in)
- Position: Winger

Team information
- Current team: Real Jaén
- Number: 22

Youth career
- Motril CF
- Santa Fe

Senior career*
Years	Team	Apps	(Gls)
2015–2016	Loja	34	(4)
2016–2017	Córdoba B	10	(0)
2017	Motril	9	(1)
2017–2019	Almería B	45	(6)
2017–2019	Almería	2	(0)
2019	Ponferradina	5	(1)
2019	El Ejido	14	(1)
2020	El Palo	14	(1)
2021	Motril	17	(3)
2021–	Real Jaén	118	(30)
- * Club domestic league appearances and goals as of 7 May 2026

Óscar Lozano Folgoso (born 14 June 1996) is a Spanish footballer who plays as a right winger for Real Jaén.

== Club career ==
Born in Motril, Granada, Andalusia, Lozano finished his formation with CD Santa Fe. In June 2015 he signed for Tercera División side Loja CD, and made his senior debut on 22 August of that year by starting in a 1–0 home win against CD El Palo.

Lozano scored his first senior goals on 1 November 2015, netting a brace in a 3–2 home win against Martos CD. After finishing the season as an undisputed starter, he signed for Córdoba CF the following 28 June, being initially assigned to the reserves in the Segunda División B.

On 4 January 2017, after being sparingly used, Lozano terminated his contract and signed for CF Motril of the fourth tier. In July he moved to another reserve team, UD Almería B, in the same division.

Lozano made his first-team debut on 22 December 2017, coming on as a second-half substitute for Pervis Estupiñán in a 0–2 away loss against AD Alcorcón in the Segunda División. On 11 April 2019, he joined third division side SD Ponferradina as a replacement for the injured Guille Donoso, and helped the side to achieve promotion to the second division in the play-offs.

On 7 August 2019, Lozano joined CD El Ejido of division four.
