= Fran (footballer, born 1995) =

Spanish footballer

Personal information
- Full name: Francisco José Rodríguez Gaitán
- Date of birth: 22 May 1995 (age 31)
- Place of birth: Almuñécar, Spain
- Height: 1.75 m (5 ft 9 in)
- Position: Right back

Team information
- Current team: Talavera de la Reina
- Number: 22

Youth career
- 2002–2007: Almuñécar 77
- 2007–2008: Motril
- 2008–2014: Real Madrid

Senior career*
Years	Team	Apps	(Gls)
2014–2015	Real Madrid C	24	(4)
2014–2016	Real Madrid B	29	(3)
2016–2017	Zaragoza	20	(0)
2017–2019	Almería	21	(0)
2019–2020	Rayo Majadahonda	3	(0)
2020–2022	Calahorra	20	(1)
2022	UD Logroñés	13	(1)
2023	Unionistas	15	(0)
2023–2024	Ceuta	25	(1)
2025–	Talavera de la Reina	23	(0)

International career
2011	Spain U17	2	(0)
- * Club domestic league appearances and goals as of 29 November 2025

Francisco José Rodríguez Gaitán (born 22 May 1995), commonly known as Fran, is a Spanish footballer who plays as a right back for Primera Federación club Talavera de la Reina.

== Club career ==
Born in Almuñécar, Granada, Andalusia, Fran joined Real Madrid's youth setup in 2008, aged 13, after spells at AD Almuñécar 77 and Motril CF. He was promoted to the former's C-team in 2014, but made his senior debut with the reserves in a 1–2 away loss against Atlético Madrid B on 24 August.

Fran scored his first senior goal on 12 October 2014, netting the game's only in an away success of the C-side over Internacional de Madrid CF. He was definitely promoted to the B-team ahead of the 2015–16 campaign, and established himself as a regular starter for the side.

On 11 July 2016 Fran signed a three-year contract with Segunda División side Real Zaragoza, as a free agent. He made his professional debut on 27 August, coming on as a second-half substitute for goalscorer Manuel Lanzarote in a 3–3 away draw against CD Lugo.

On 12 July 2017, Fran moved to fellow second division team UD Almería on a two-year deal. In the following March, he suffered a knee injury which took him out of the entire 2018–19 campaign.

Fran subsequently resumed his career in the third division, representing CF Rayo Majadahonda and CD Calahorra.

== Personal life ==
Fran's older brother Andy is also a footballer. A midfielder, he was part of Real Madrid's youth setup.
