= Antonio Domínguez (footballer) =

Spanish footballer (born 1993)

Personal information
- Full name: Antonio Domínguez Sacramento
- Date of birth: 4 April 1993 (age 33)
- Place of birth: Punta Umbría, Spain
- Height: 1.77 m (5 ft 9 1/2 in)
- Position: Attacking midfielder

Team information
- Current team: Recreativo
- Number: 10

Youth career
- Punta Umbría
- 2004–2012: Recreativo

Senior career*
Years	Team	Apps	(Gls)
2012–2015	Recreativo B	54	(20)
2012–2013	→ Olímpica (loan)	?	(17)
2013–2018	Recreativo	80	(12)
2018	Valladolid B	19	(7)
2018–2019	Valladolid	0	(0)
2018–2019	→ Sabadell (loan)	28	(3)
2019–2020	Algeciras	22	(7)
2020–2022	ŁKS Łódź	67	(13)
2022–2023	GKS Tychy	29	(3)
2023–	Recreativo	95	(9)
- * Club domestic league appearances and goals as of 7 May 2026

Antonio Domínguez Sacramento (born 4 April 1993) is a Spanish professional footballer who plays as an attacking midfielder for Recreativo de Huelva.

== Football career ==
Born in Punta Umbría, Andalusia, Domínguez graduated from local Recreativo de Huelva, and made his senior debuts while on loan at lowly Olímpica Valverdeña CF. In the 2013 summer he returned to Recre and was assigned to the reserves in Tercera División; Domínguez was later called up to train with the main squad in late August.

On 11 September 2013 Domínguez first appeared for the main squad, starting in a 3–2 home win against Sporting de Gijón, for the season's Copa del Rey. He made his league debut on 13 December of the following year, coming on as a late substitute for Jesús Vázquez in a 2–4 home loss against UD Las Palmas in the Segunda División championship.

On 22 March 2015 Domínguez scored his first professional goal, netting the last in a 1–1 away draw against Sporting de Gijón. After suffering relegation, he renewed his contract and was definitely promoted to the main squad.

On 10 January 2018, Domínguez terminated his contract with Recre, and moved to fellow league team Real Valladolid B just hours later. On 14 May, he renewed his contract until 2020 and was definitely promoted to Valladolid's first team ahead of the 2018–19 campaign.

On 31 August 2018, Domínguez joined third tier team CE Sabadell FC on a season-long loan.
