= Joaquín Fernández (footballer, born 1996) =

Spanish footballer

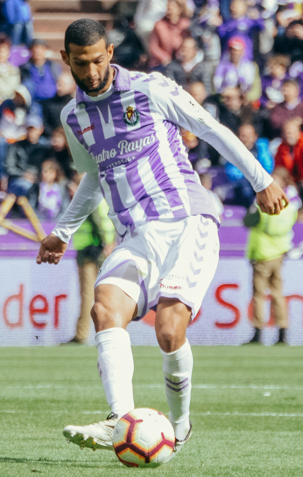
- Joaquín with Valladolid in 2019

Personal information
- Full name: Joaquín Fernández Moreno
- Date of birth: 31 May 1996 (age 30)
- Place of birth: Huércal de Almería, Spain
- Height: 1.90 m (6 ft 3 in)
- Positions: Centre-back; midfielder

Team information
- Current team: Mirandés

Youth career
- La Cañada
- 2010–2013: Almería

Senior career*
Years	Team	Apps	(Gls)
2013–2016	Almería B	98	(1)
2015–2018	Almería	75	(0)
2018–2023	Valladolid	111	(5)
2023–2024	Trabzonspor	13	(0)
2024–2025	Kansas City	19	(0)
2026	Huesca	2	(0)
2026–	Mirandés	0	(0)

International career^{‡}
2012	Spain U16	5	(0)
2012–2013	Spain U17	8	(0)
2014	Spain U18	1	(0)
- * Club domestic league appearances and goals as of 9 June 2026 ‡ National team caps and goals as of 05:58, 18 May 2021 (UTC)

Joaquín Fernández Moreno (born 31 May 1996), sometimes known as just Joaquín, is a Spanish professional footballer who plays as a centre-back or midfielder for CD Mirandés.

== Club career ==
=== Almería ===
Born in Huércal de Almería, Almería, Andalusia, Joaquín joined UD Almería's youth setup in 2010, aged 16, after starting it out at UCD La Cañada Atlético. He made his senior debuts with the B-team in the 2012–13 season, in Segunda División B.

On 2 December 2013 Joaquín moved to Liverpool in a trial basis. He trained with the club's under-18 squad, but returned to the Rojiblancos ten days later.

On 14 October 2015 Joaquín made his first team debut, starting in a 2–1 Copa del Rey home win against Gimnàstic de Tarragona. He made his Segunda División debut on 9 January of the following year, coming on as a late substitute for Quique González in a 1–1 draw at CD Mirandés.

On 1 December 2016, after becoming a regular starter under Fernando Soriano, Joaquín renewed his contract until 2021, being definitely promoted to the main squad the following January. Ahead of the 2018–19 campaign, he was named team captain.

=== Valladolid ===
On 31 August 2018, Joaquín signed a five-year contract with Real Valladolid, newly promoted to La Liga.

=== Trabzonspor ===
On 30 June 2023, Joaquín moved abroad and signed for Trabzonspor of the Turkish Süper Lig.

=== Sporting Kansas City ===
On 13 August 2024, Joaquín signed an eighteen month contract with a Major League Soccer Club, Sporting Kansas City. Following the 2025 season, Kansas City opted to release him from the club.

=== Later career ===
On 28 January 2026, Joaquín returned to his home country and joined SD Huesca in the second division on a short-term deal. On 6 July, after suffering relegation, he moved to CD Mirandés, also relegated to Primera Federación, on a one-year contract.

== Career statistics ==
As of match played on 19 October 2024

Appearances and goals by club, season and competition
Club	Season	League			National Cup		League Cup		Other		Total	
Club	Season	Division	Apps	Goals	Apps	Goals	Apps	Goals	Apps	Goals	Apps	Goals
Almería B	2012–13	Segunda División B	2	0	—		—		—		2	0
Almería B	2013–14	Segunda División B	26	0	—		—		—		26	0
Almería B	2014–15	Segunda División B	33	0	—		—		2	0	35	0
Almería B	2015–16	Segunda División B	36	1	—		—		—		36	1
Almería B	Total		97	1	—		—		2	0	99	1
Almería	2015–16	Segunda División	2	0	2	0	—		—		4	0
Almería	2016–17	Segunda División	36	0	1	0	—		—		37	0
Almería	2017–18	Segunda División	35	0	1	0	—		—		36	0
Almería	2018–19	Segunda División	2	0	—		—		—		2	0
Almería	Total		75	0	4	0	—		—		79	0
Valladolid	2018–19	La Liga	13	1	4	0	—		—		17	1
Valladolid	2019–20	La Liga	20	2	1	0	—		—		21	2
Valladolid	2020–21	La Liga	25	1	2	0	—		—		27	1
Valladolid	2021–22	Segunda División	26	0	0	0	—		—		26	0
Valladolid	2022–23	La Liga	27	1	2	0	—		—		29	1
Valladolid	Total		111	5	9	0	—		—		120	5
Trabzonspor	2023–24	Süper Lig	13	0	4	0	—		—		17	0
Sporting Kansas City	2024	Major League Soccer	2	0	0	0	—		—		2	0
Career total			298	6	17	0	0	0	2	0	317	6
