= Pablo Caballero (footballer, born 1986) =

Argentine footballer

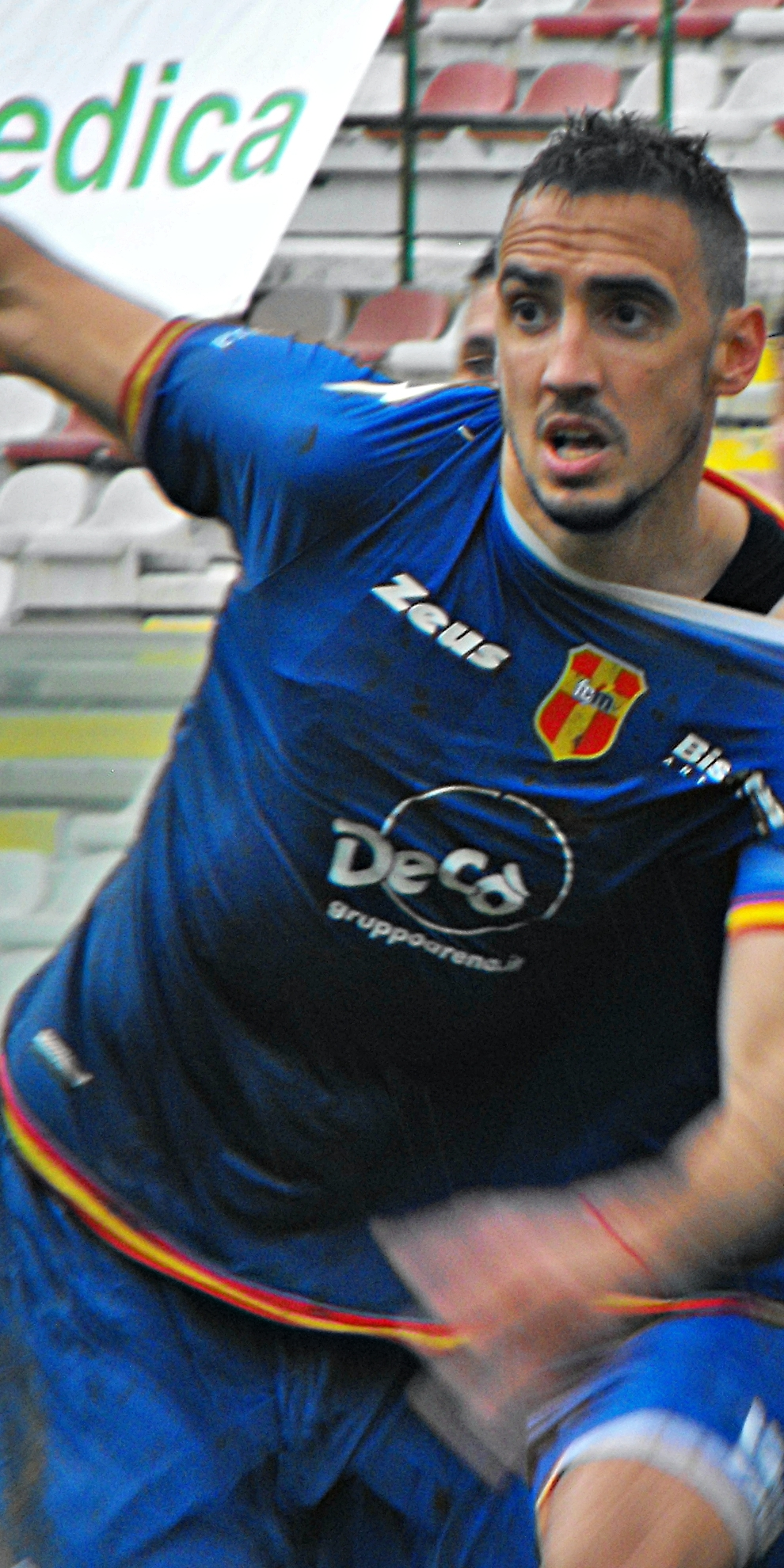

Personal information
- Full name: Pablo Nicolás Caballero Santos
- Date of birth: 21 July 1986 (age 40)
- Place of birth: Totoras, Argentina
- Height: 1.91 m (6 ft 3 in)
- Position: Forward

Youth career
- Racing Club

Senior career*
Years	Team	Apps	(Gls)
2007–2012	Racing Club	44	(6)
2010	→ Tigre (loan)	6	(0)
2011	→ Guaraní (loan)	15	(1)
2012–2013	Almirante Brown	37	(9)
2013	Qingdao Jonoon	13	(2)
2014–2015	Ferro Carril Oeste	30	(4)
2015–2017	Lugo	83	(21)
2017–2019	Almería	39	(5)
2019–2020	FC Cartagena	22	(5)
2020–2021	FC Messina	19	(8)
2021–2022	Tudelano	32	(12)
2022–2025	Recreativo	56	(19)
- * Club domestic league appearances and goals as of 10 June 2025

Pablo Nicolás Caballero Santos (locally [ˈpaβlo nikoˈlas kaβaˈʎeɾo]; born 21 July 1986) is an Argentine footballer who plays as a forward.

== Club career ==
Born in Totoras, Santa Fe, Caballero graduated from Racing Club de Avellaneda's youth setup. He made his professional debut on 24 November 2007, starting in a 0–0 home draw against Independiente for the Primera División championship.

Caballero scored his first professional goal on 28 September 2008, netting his side's last in a 3–3 away draw against River Plate. He appeared in 29 matches during the campaign, scoring three goals.

On 26 July 2010 Caballero was loaned to Tigre. After another temporary spell at Guaraní, he returned to Racing, but only appeared sparingly.

In the 2012 summer Caballero moved to Primera B Nacional's Almirante Brown. After appearing and scoring regularly, he moved to Chinese Super League side Qingdao Jonoon on 23 July 2013.

In January 2014 Caballero returned to his home country, signing for Ferro Carril Oeste. On 30 January 2015 he joined Spanish Segunda División side CD Lugo.

On 17 July 2017, free agent Caballero signed a two-year contract with UD Almería still in the second tier.

After a season with FC Cartagena, he moved to Italy in October 2020 to join Serie D club FC Messina.
