= Antonio Navas =

Spanish footballer (born 1995)

Personal information
- Full name: Antonio Francisco Navas Vargas
- Date of birth: 13 February 1995 (age 31)
- Place of birth: El Ejido, Spain
- Height: 1.63 m (5 ft 4 in)
- Position: Right-back

Youth career
- Poli Ejido
- 2009–2013: Betis

Senior career*
| Years | Team | Apps | (Gls) |
| 2013–2016 | Recreativo B | 60 | (0) |
| 2016–2019 | Almería B | 95 | (4) |
| 2016–2018 | Almería | 2 | (0) |
| 2019–2020 | Sanluqueño | 27 | (0) |
| 2020–2021 | Real Murcia | 10 | (0) |
| 2021–2022 | Sanluqueño | 32 | (0) |
| 2022–2023 | Antequera | 13 | (2) |
| 2023–2024 | Vélez | 19 | (1) |
| 2024 | UCAM Murcia | 7 | (0) |
| 2024–2025 | Cacereño | 20 | (0) |
- * Club domestic league appearances and goals as of 4 May 2025

Antonio Francisco Navas Vargas (born 13 February 1995) is a Spanish footballer who plays as a right-back.

== Club career ==
Born in El Ejido, Almería, Andalusia, Navas represented Polideportivo Ejido and Real Betis as a youth. In January 2013 he moved to Recreativo de Huelva, being assigned to the reserves in Tercera División.

Navas made his senior debut on 16 February 2013, coming on as a second-half substitute in a 0–4 home loss against CD Mairena. In August 2016 he moved to another reserve team, UD Almería B also in the fourth division.

On 6 September 2016 Navas made his first team debut, replacing Isidoro in a 0–2 Copa del Rey home loss against Rayo Vallecano. He scored his first senior goal on 6 November, in a 3–0 away win against Vélez CF.

Navas made his Segunda División debut on 13 January 2018, starting in a 1–1 home draw against Gimnàstic de Tarragona. On 20 August of the following year, he signed a one-year contract with Atlético Sanluqueño CF in division three, after his contract with the Rojiblancos expired.

After joining Sanluqueño, Navas played for Antequera CF and Vélez CF before signing for UCAM Murcia in late January 2024.
