= Pervis Estupiñán =

Ecuadorian footballer (born 1998)

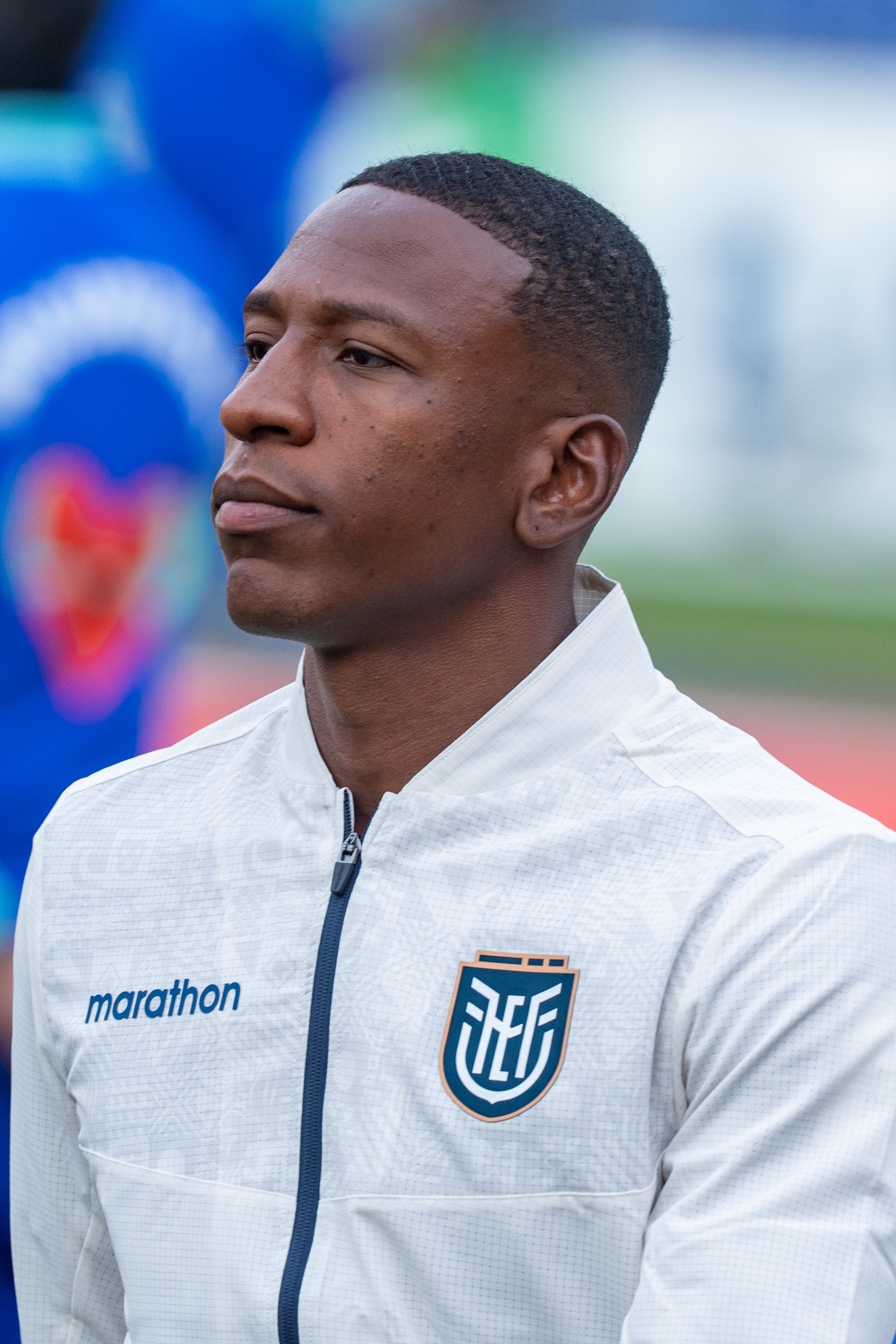
- Estupiñán with Ecuador in 2026

Personal information
- Full name: Pervis Josué Estupiñán Tenorio
- Date of birth: 21 January 1998 (age 28)
- Place of birth: Esmeraldas, Ecuador
- Height: 1.75 m (5 ft 9 in)
- Positions: Left-back; left wing-back

Team information
- Current team: AC Milan
- Number: 2

Youth career
- 2011–2014: LDU Quito

Senior career*
Years	Team	Apps	(Gls)
2015–2016	LDU Quito	40	(0)
2016–2020	Watford	0	(0)
2016–2017	→ Granada B (loan)	21	(2)
2016–2017	→ Granada (loan)	2	(0)
2017–2018	→ Almería (loan)	26	(0)
2018–2019	→ Mallorca (loan)	12	(2)
2019–2020	→ Osasuna (loan)	36	(1)
2020–2022	Villarreal	53	(0)
2022–2025	Brighton & Hove Albion	84	(4)
2025–	AC Milan	29	(1)

International career^{‡}
2015	Ecuador U17	14	(3)
2017	Ecuador U20	12	(4)
2019–	Ecuador	58	(5)
- * Club domestic league appearances and goals as of 21:12, 22 November 2026 (UTC) ‡ National team caps and goals as of 21:13, 1 October 2026 (UTC)

Pervis Josué Estupiñán Tenorio (Spanish pronunciation: [estupiˈɲan]; born 21 January 1998) is an Ecuadorian professional footballer who plays as a left-back and left wing-back for Serie A club AC Milan and the Ecuador national team.

== Club career ==
=== Early career ===
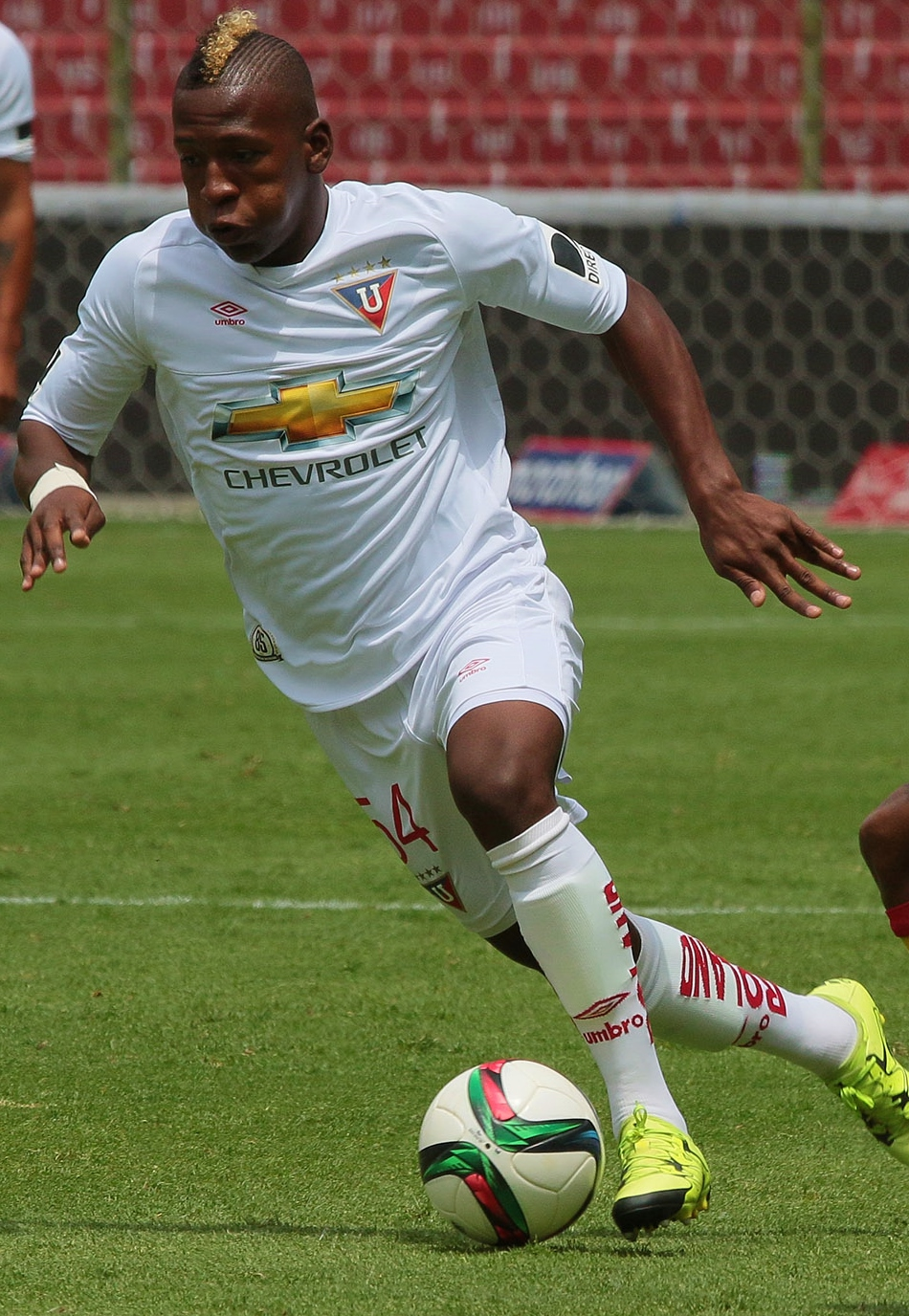
Estupiñán playing for LDU Quito in 2015

Born in Esmeraldas, Estupiñán joined LDU Quito's youth setup in 2011, aged 13. He was promoted to the first team ahead of the 2015 season, and made his professional debut on 1 February of that year by starting in a 1–0 home win against El Nacional.

=== Watford and following loans ===
An undisputed starter for the club, Estupiñán was sold to Premier League club Watford on 29 July 2016, being immediately loaned to Granada CF and assigned to the latter's B-team in Segunda División B.

Estupiñán made his La Liga debut on 5 April 2017, starting in a 0–0 away draw against Deportivo de La Coruña. On 17 July, he was loaned to Segunda División side UD Almería for one year.

On 9 August 2018, Estupiñán agreed to a one-year loan deal with RCD Mallorca in the second division. The following 3 July, after achieving promotion, he signed a two-year loan deal with CA Osasuna, also freshly promoted.

=== Villarreal ===
On 16 September 2020, Estupiñán signed a seven-year contract with Spanish side Villarreal for an initial fee of £14.9 million.

During his spell at the Valencian club, Estupiñán was a member of the squad that won the 2020–21 UEFA Europa League and reached the semi-finals of the 2021–22 UEFA Champions League.

=== Brighton and Hove Albion ===
On 16 August 2022, Estupiñán signed a five-year contract with English side Brighton & Hove Albion for an undisclosed fee. He made his debut four days later, coming on and replacing Adam Lallana in the 63rd minute in a 2–0 away win over West Ham United. Estupiñán made his first start for the Seagulls on 27 August, helping Brighton to another win and clean sheet in the 1–0 home victory over Leeds United. Estupiñán assisted returning World Cup champion Alexis Mac Allister's flick-on in a 5–1 away victory over EFL Championship side Middlesbrough in the FA Cup third round on 7 January 2023. Two weeks later, on his 25th birthday, he provided a brace of assists, setting up both Kaoru Mitoma's opening goal and Evan Ferguson's late equaliser in a 2–2 away draw to Leicester City in the league.

On 29 January, Estupiñán recorded his fourth assist of the season in a 2–1 victory over Liverpool, helping Brighton to advance to the fifth round of the FA Cup. Two games later on 11 February, he added a further assist to his tally a 1–1 away draw against Crystal Palace. Early on in the game he had a goal wrongly ruled out by John Brooks of VAR after the official drew the offside lines against the wrong player. Brooks was later dropped for his next two matches. Estupiñán scored his first goal for the Albion on 14 May, hitting in stoppage time, scoring the third in the 3–0 away win at Arsenal, while assisting Julio Enciso's opener.

After setting up Mitoma's opener, Estupiñán scored his second Brighton goal in their second match of the 2023–24 season on 19 August, in a 4–1 victory away to Wolverhampton Wanderers.

On 28 December, after months out due to injury, Estupiñán scored a long-range goal after coming on as a substitute at half-time in a 4–2 win against Tottenham Hotspur.

=== AC Milan ===
On 24 July 2025, Estupiñán signed a five-year contract with Italian side AC Milan for an undisclosed fee, reported to be at least £17 million. This signing made him the first Ecuadorian in the club's history.

On 8 March 2026, he scored his first Serie A goal for the club in the Derby della Madonnina against Inter, in an eventual 1–0 home win.

== International career ==
Estupiñán made his debut for the Ecuador national team on 13 October 2019 in a friendly against Argentina that ended in a 6–1 loss.

Estupiñán played for Ecuador at the 2019 Copa América and was named in the Team of the Tournament as La Tri reached the quarter-finals.

On 14 November, Estupiñán was named in Ecuador's 26-man squad for the 2022 FIFA World Cup alongside Brighton teammates Jeremy Sarmiento and Moisés Caicedo.

On 31 May 2026, Estupiñán was selected in the 26-man squad for the 2026 FIFA World Cup.

== Career statistics ==
=== Club ===
As of match played 22 November 2026

Appearances and goals by club, season and competition
Club	Season	League			National cup (Note: Includes Copa del Rey, FA Cup, Coppa Italia)		League cup (Note: Includes EFL Cup)		Continental		Other		Total	
Club	Season	Division	Apps	Goals	Apps	Goals	Apps	Goals	Apps	Goals	Apps	Goals	Apps	Goals
LDU Quito	2015	LigaPro Serie A	32	0	0	0	—		2 (Note: Appearances in Copa Sudamericana)	0	—		34	0
LDU Quito	2016	LigaPro Serie A	8	0	0	0	—		3 (Note: Appearances in Copa Libertadores)	0	—		11	0
LDU Quito	Total		40	0	—		—		5	0	—		45	0
Granada B (loan)	2016–17	Segunda División B	21	2	—		—		—		—		21	2
Granada (loan)	2016–17	La Liga	2	0	0	0	—		—		—		2	0
Almería (loan)	2017–18	Segunda División	26	0	1	0	—		—		—		27	0
Mallorca (loan)	2018–19	Segunda División	12	2	2	0	—		—		—		14	2
Osasuna (loan)	2019–20	La Liga	36	1	3	0	—		—		—		39	1
Villarreal	2020–21	La Liga	25	0	4	0	—		4 (Note: Appearances in UEFA Europa League)	0	—		33	0
Villarreal	2021–22	La Liga	28	0	2	0	—		10 (Note: Appearances in UEFA Champions League)	0	1 (Note: Appearance in UEFA Super Cup)	0	41	0
Villarreal	Total		53	0	6	0	—		14	0	1	0	74	0
Brighton & Hove Albion	2022–23	Premier League	35	1	4	0	2	0	—		—		41	1
Brighton & Hove Albion	2023–24	Premier League	19	2	3	1	1	0	4	0	—		27	3
Brighton & Hove Albion	2024–25	Premier League	30	1	3	0	3	0	—		—		36	1
Brighton & Hove Albion	Total		84	4	10	1	6	0	4	0	—		104	5
AC Milan	2025–26	Serie A	19	1	2	0	—		—		1 (Note: Appearance in Supercoppa Italiana)	0	22	1
AC Milan	2026–27	Serie A	10	0	0	0	—		1	0	—		11	0
AC Milan	Total		29	1	2	0	—		1	0	1	0	33	1
Career total			303	10	24	1	6	0	24	0	2	0	359	11

=== International ===
As of match played 1 October 2026

Appearances and goals by national team and year
National team	Year	Apps	Goals
Ecuador	2019	1	0
Ecuador	2020	4	1
Ecuador	2021	14	1
Ecuador	2022	12	1
Ecuador	2023	6	1
Ecuador	2024	7	0
Ecuador	2025	6	0
Ecuador	2026	8	1
Total		58	5

Scores and results list Ecuador's goal tally first.

List of international goals scored by Pervis Estupiñán
No.	Date	Venue	Opponent	Score	Result	Competition
1	17 November 2020	Estadio Rodrigo Paz Delgado, Quito, Ecuador	Colombia	6–1	6–1	2022 FIFA World Cup qualification
2	16 November 2021	Estadio San Carlos de Apoquindo, Santiago, Chile	Chile	1–0	2–0	2022 FIFA World Cup qualification
3	2 June 2022	Red Bull Arena, Harrison, United States	Nigeria	1–0	1–0	Friendly
4	28 March 2023	Docklands Stadium, Melbourne, Australia	Australia	1–1	2–1	Friendly
5	7 June 2026	ScottsMiracle-Gro Field, Columbus, United States	Guatemala	3–0	3–0	Friendly

== Honours ==
Villarreal

- UEFA Europa League: 2020–21

Individual

- Copa América Team of the Tournament: 2021
