= Alfonso Falero =

Spanish japanologist

Alfonso Falero Folgoso is a Spanish japanologist born in Granada in 1959. He is an expert on the history of Japanese thinking and the Shintō religion.

== Biography ==
Alfonso Falero obtained a B.A. in Philosophy at the University of Granada (Spain) in 1981. He went to Japan, and he lived there from 1984 to 1986, working in different fields. After returning to Europe, he went back to Japan and for a period comprised between 1990 and 1998 he studied Japanese language at Ōsaka Foreign Studies University and later Shinto at Tokyo's Kokugakuin University, one of the most prestigious schools in the field of Japanese Classical Studies. At this University he obtained a Ph.D. degree with a dissertation, originally written in Japanese language (The Christian and Shintō Idea of Sin (“tsumi”); a Comparative Approach). He became the first foreign national to obtain such a degree at a Japanese university on this field of studies. His adviser was professor Kenji Ueda (上田賢治), the most prestigious Shintō studies scholar at that time.

When he returned to his native country he became head and founder of the Oriental Studies Section at the University of Salamanca, one of the only three Spanish universities where an M.A. degree is offered in this field.

== Fields of Research ==
His work at the University of Salamanca is centered on:

1. History of Japanese thinking.
2. History of Shinto.
3. Japanese literature.

Alfonso Falero is among the most prominent Spanish japanologists alive and one of the leading authorities in the field of Shinto Studies outside Japan.

== Main Bibliography ==
- Aproximación a la cultura japonesa (Salamanca 2006)
- Aproximación al Shintoísmo (Salamanca 2007)
- Ensayos de estética y hermenéutica: iki y furyu (Kuki Shuzo) Valencia 2007
- Aproximación a la literatura clásica japonesa (Salamanca 2014)
