= 2016–17 CD Mirandés season =

Spanish football team season

Club Deportivo Mirandés is a Spanish football team based in Miranda de Ebro, Province of Burgos. During the 2016/17 campaign they competed in the Segunda División and the Copa del Rey.

They were eliminated from the Copa del Rey by Elche via penalties.

== Competitions ==
=== Segunda División ===
==== Results summary ====
Overall								Home						Away					
Pld	W	D	L	GF	GA	GD	Pts	W	D	L	GF	GA	GD	W	D	L	GF	GA	GD
42	9	14	19	40	66	−26	41	6	7	8	24	32	−8	3	7	11	16	34	−18

Last updated: 11 June 2017.

==== Results by match day ====
Matchday	1	2	3	4	5	6	7	8	9	10	11	12	13	14	15	16	17	18	19	20	21	22	23	24	25	26	27	28	29	30	31	32	33	34	35	36	37	38	39	40	41	42
Ground	H	A	H	A	H	A	H	A	H	A	H	A	H	A	H	A	H	A	H	A	H	A	H	A	H	A	H	A	H	A	H	A	H	A	H	A	H	A	H	A	H	A
Result	D	D	W	D	W	D	W	D	D	L	L	L	L	L	D	L	W	L	W	L	L	D	D	L	L	W	L	D	D	L	L	L	W	L	L	D	L	W	D	L	D	W
Position	12	12	10	12	10	12	10	12	12	14	16	18	21	21	21	21	19	21	19	21	21	21	21	21	21	20	21	22	22	22	22	22	22	22	22	22	22	22	22	22	22	22

Updated to match(es) played on 11 June 2017. Source:
A = Away; H = Home; W = Win; D = Draw; L = Loss

== Matches ==
19 August 2016 1	Mirandés	1 – 1	Getafe	Miranda de Ebro
20:00 CET	Fran Cruz (yellow card) 51'; Guarrotxena 65'	Report	Jorge Molina (yellow card) 25'; Daniel Pacheco 52' (pen.); Lacen (yellow card) 63'; Yoda (yellow card) 77'	Stadium: Estadio Municipal de Anduva; Attendance: 3,041; Referee: (Spain) Javier Alberola

27 August 2016 2	Reus	1 – 1	Mirandés	Reus
19:00 CET	Fran Carbià 1'; Diaz (yellow card) 50'; Ángel Martínez (yellow card) 75'; Pichu Atienza (yellow card) 89'	Report	Fofo 14'; Kijera (yellow card) 20'; Rúper (yellow card) 45+5'; Aurtenetxe (yellow card) 74'	Stadium: Estadi Municipal de Reus; Attendance: 3,078; Referee: (Spain) Juan López

3 September 2016 3	Mirandés	3 – 2	Cádiz	Miranda de Ebro
16:00 CET	Javier Hervás (yellow card) 39'; Íñigo Eguaras 52' (pen.); Maikel Mesa 55'; Guarrotxena 66'	Report	Ortuño 8'; Aridane Hernández (yellow card) 30'; Salvi 33'; Gorka Santamaría (yellow card) 33' (yellow-red card); Mantecón (yellow card) 36'; Álvaro García (yellow card) 45'; Jon Ander Garrido (yellow card) 51'; Dani Güiza (yellow card) 62'; Sankaré (yellow card) 68'	Stadium: Estadio Municipal de Anduva; Attendance: 3,060; Referee: (Spain) Saúl Ais

11 September 2016 4	Real Oviedo	0 – 0	Mirandés	Oviedo
16:00 CET	Francisco Varela (yellow card) 41'	Report	Carlos Moreno (yellow card) 61'; Kijera (yellow card) 88'	Stadium: Estadio Carlos Tartiere; Attendance: 12,646; Referee: (Spain) Valentín Pizarro

18 September 2016 5	Mirandés	2 – 1	Rayo Vallecano	Miranda de Ebro
16:00 CET	Pedro Martín 34'; Guarrotxena 54'	Report	Adri Embarba 44'; Nacho (yellow card) 45'; Diego Aguirre (yellow card) 77'	Stadium: Estadio Municipal de Anduva; Attendance: 3,562; Referee: (Spain) Francisco Arias

22 September 2016 6	Girona	1 – 1	Mirandés	Girona
20:00 CET	Borja García 54'	Report	Íñigo Eguaras (yellow card) 26'; Fran Cruz (yellow card) 67'; Aurtenetxe 84'	Stadium: Estadi Montilivi; Attendance: 3,534; Referee: (Spain) Jorge Figueroa

25 September 2016 7	Mirandés	3 – 2	Tenerife	Miranda de Ebro
16:00 CET	Álvaro Bustos 8' 17'; Aurtenetxe (yellow card) 36'; Guarrotxena 65'; Íñigo Eguaras (yellow card) 71'	Report	Aitor Sanz (yellow card) 9'; Suso Santana 59'; Jouini 69'; Vitolo (yellow card) 85'	Stadium: Estadio Municipal de Anduva; Attendance: 3,093; Referee: (Spain) Pablo González

2 October 2016 8	UCAM Murcia	2 – 2	Mirandés	Murcia
12:00 CET	Jona 23'; Nono 81'; Tito (yellow card) 90'	Report	Fran Cruz 33'; Néstor Salinas 41'	Stadium: Estadio de La Condomina; Attendance: 3,523; Referee: (Spain) Aitor Gorostegui

9 October 2016 9	Mirandés	2 – 2	Lugo	Miranda de Ebro
16:00 CET	Maikel Mesa 68' (pen.); Guarrotxena 77'	Report	Joselu 13'; Alfonso Pedraza 18'; Carlos Pita (yellow card) 67'; Caballero (yellow card) 90+2'	Stadium: Estadio Municipal de Anduva; Attendance: 3,195; Referee: (Spain) Pedro Pérez

15 October 2016 10	Huesca	3 – 0	Mirandés	Huesca
18:00 CET	Jesús Valentín (yellow card) 34'; Álvaro Vadillo 39' (yellow card) 79'; González 65'; Nagore (yellow card) 82'; Borja Lázaro 86'; Brežančić (yellow card) 90'	Report	Pau Cendrós (yellow card) 41'; Aurtenetxe (yellow card) 87'	Stadium: Estadio El Alcoraz; Attendance: 2,800; Referee: (Spain) Isidro Díaz de Mera

23 October 2016 11	Mirandés	0 – 3	Levante	Miranda de Ebro
18:00 CET	Pau Cendrós (yellow card) 53' (yellow-red card)	Report	Roger Martí 28' 64'; Abraham (yellow card) 33'; Jason 75'	Stadium: Estadio Municipal de Anduva; Attendance: 3,288; Referee: (Spain) Eduardo Prieto

30 October 2016 12	Alcorcón	1 – 0	Mirandés	Alcorcón
18:00 CET	David Rodríguez 47'; Rafael Páez (yellow card) 61'; Luque (yellow card) 81'	Report	Rúper (yellow card) 24'; Kijera (yellow card) 45'; Daniel Provencio (yellow card) 87'; Carlos Moreno (yellow card) 90+1'	Stadium: Santo Domingo; Attendance: 2,508; Referee: (Spain) David Pérez

6 November 2016 13	Mirandés	0 – 1	Gimnàstic de Tarragona	Miranda de Ebro
12:00 CET	Guarrotxena (yellow card) 87'; Fran Cruz (yellow card) 90+5'	Report	Juan Muñiz 56' (yellow card) 78'; Gerard Valentín (yellow card) 77'; Ferrán Giner (yellow card) 87'; Dimitrievski (yellow card) 90+2'; Mossa (yellow card) 90+4'	Stadium: Estadio Municipal de Anduva; Attendance: 2,962; Referee: (Spain) Guillermo Cuadra Fernández

13 November 2016 14	Real Zaragoza	2 – 0	Mirandés	Zaragoza
20:00 CET	Cabrera 34'; Edu García 43'	Report	Álex Ortiz (yellow card) 38'; Fran Cruz (yellow card) 74'	Stadium: La Romareda; Attendance: 15,645; Referee: (Spain) David Medié

20 November 2016 15	Mirandés	1 – 1	Córdoba	Miranda de Ebro
20:00 CET	Pedro Martín 22'; Carlos Moreno (yellow card) 53'; Aurtenetxe (yellow card) 85'	Report	Juli (yellow card) 38' (goal) 63'; Bijimine (yellow card) 86'	Stadium: Estadio Municipal de Anduva; Attendance: 2,494; Referee: (Spain) Víctor Areces

27 November 2016 16	Sevilla Atlético	1 – 0	Mirandés	Seville
18:00 CET	Diego González (yellow card) 24'; Álex Pozo 42'	Report	Marco Sangalli (yellow card) 39'; Fran Cruz (yellow card) 72'; Javier Hervás (yellow card) 79'; Rúper (yellow card) 83'	Stadium: Ramón Sánchez Pizjuán Stadium; Attendance: 2,513; Referee: (Spain) Pablo González

3 December 2016 17	Mirandés	1 – 0	Elche	Miranda de Ebro
18:15 CET	Maikel Mesa 25'; Rúper (yellow card) 68'; Marco Sangalli (yellow card) 72'	Report	Pelayo (yellow card) 64'	Stadium: Estadio Municipal de Anduva; Attendance: 2,724; Referee: (Spain) Jorge Figueroa

11 December 2016 18	Valladolid	5 – 0	Mirandés	Valladolid
18:00 CET	José 5'; Juan Villar 33'; Jaime Mata 51' (pen.) 72'; Raúl de Tomás 85'	Report	Ruymán (yellow card) 24'; Guarrotxena (yellow card) 75'	Stadium: Estadio José Zorrilla; Attendance: 8,032; Referee: (Spain) Francisco Arias

18 December 2016 19	Mirandés	2 – 1	Almería	Miranda de Ebro
18:00 CET	Álex Ortiz 59'; Maikel Mesa 70' (yellow card) 71'; Rúper (yellow card) 78'; Pedro Martín (yellow card) 82'	Report	Juanjo Expósito (yellow card) 7'; José Ángel (yellow card) 15'; Quique 47'; Jorge Morcillo (yellow card) 71'	Stadium: Estadio Municipal de Anduva; Attendance: 3,093; Referee: (Spain) Valentín Pizarro

6 January 2017 20	Mallorca	2 – 0	Mirandés	Palma
18:00 CET	Lekić 81'; Lago Junior 90+2' (yellow card) 90+2'	Report	Usero (yellow card) 12'; Maikel Mesa (yellow card) 73'	Stadium: Iberostar Stadium; Attendance: 7,707; Referee: (Spain) Gorka Sagues

14 January 2017 21	Mirandés	0 – 3	Numancia	Miranda de Ebro
18:00 CET	Maikel Mesa (yellow card) 28'; Usero (yellow card) 37'; Pedro Martín (yellow card) 74'; Íñigo Eguaras (yellow card) 90'	Report	Álvarez 37' (pen.); Ripa (yellow card) 58'; Álex Ortiz 79' (o.g.); Alberto Escassi 81'	Stadium: Estadio Municipal de Anduva; Attendance: 2,795; Referee: (Spain) Pablo González

22 January 2017 22	Getafe	1 – 1	Mirandés	Getafe
18:00 CET	Peña (yellow card) 4'; Daniel Pacheco 15'; Gorosito (yellow card) 75'	Report	Íñigo Eguaras (yellow card) 33'; Pedro Martín (yellow card) 39'; Álex Ortiz 53'; Roberto (yellow card) 83'	Stadium: Coliseum Alfonso Pérez; Attendance: 5,540; Referee: (Spain) Jorge Figueroa

28 January 2017 23	Mirandés	1 – 1	Reus	Miranda de Ebro
18:00 CET	Guarrotxena 39'	Report	David Querol 84'	Stadium: Estadio Municipal de Anduva; Attendance: 3,123; Referee: (Spain) Juan Pulido

4 February 2017 24	Cádiz	2 – 1	Mirandés	Cádiz
18:00 CET	Sankaré (yellow card) 19'; Abdullah 35'; Ortuño 79'	Report	Guarrotxena 5'; Álex Ortiz (yellow card) 60'; Carlos Moreno (yellow card) 80'; Álex García (yellow card) 83'	Stadium: Estadio Ramón de Carranza; Referee: (Spain) Víctor Areces

12 February 2017 25	Mirandés	0 – 2	Real Oviedo	Miranda de Ebro
18:00 CET	Álex García (yellow card) 37'; Maikel Mesa (yellow card) 38'; Daniel Provencio (yellow card) 68'; Álvaro Bustos (yellow card) 82'; Álex Ortiz (yellow card) 90+2'	Report	Saúl Berjón 21'; Juan Carlos (yellow card) 29'; David Costas 63'	Stadium: Estadio Municipal de Anduva; Attendance: 4,150; Referee: (Spain) Gorka Sagues

19 February 2017 26	Rayo Vallecano	1 – 2	Mirandés	Madrid
18:00 CET	Ernesto Galán 50'; Diego Aguirre (yellow card) 52' (yellow-red card); Antonio Amaya (yellow card) 56'; Manucho (yellow card) 73'	Report	Guarrotxena (yellow card) 31'; Marco Sangalli (yellow card) 51' (goal) 85'; Carlos Moreno (yellow card) 56'; Urko Vera 62'	Stadium: Campo de Fútbol de Vallecas; Attendance: 8,567; Referee: (Spain) Pablo González

25 February 2017 27	Mirandés	0 – 2	Girona	Miranda de Ebro
18:00 CET	Daniel Provencio (yellow card) 33'	Report	Pablo Maffeo (yellow card) 41'; Juanpe (yellow card) 43'; Álex Granell (yellow card) 74'; Sandaza 84' (yellow card) 84'; Longo 87' (pen.)	Stadium: Estadio Municipal de Anduva; Attendance: 3,228; Referee: (Spain) Juan López

3 March 2017 28	Tenerife	1 – 1	Mirandés	Santa Cruz de Tenerife
21:00	Jorge (yellow card) 13'; Diedhiou 18'; Camille (yellow card) 21'; Ismael Falcón (yellow card) 76'; Suso Santana (yellow card) 77'; Cristo González (yellow card) 86'	Report	Fran Cruz (yellow card) 34'; Néstor Salinas 42'; Kijera (yellow card) 76'; Guarrotxena (yellow card) 79'; Daniel Provencio (yellow card) 85'; Sergio Pérez (yellow card) 90+1'	Stadium: Estadio Heliodoro Rodríguez López; Attendance: 15,506; Referee: (Spain) Rubén Eiriz

11 March 2017 29	Mirandés	1- 1	UCAM Murcia	Miranda de Ebro
18:00	Daniel Provencio (yellow card) 41'; Guarrotxena 69'; Íñigo Eguaras (yellow card) 72'	Report	Mejía 63'; David Morillas (yellow card) 67'	Stadium: Estadio Municipal de Anduva; Attendance: 3,201; Referee: (Spain) David Pérez

18 March 2017 30	Lugo	2 – 1	Mirandés	Lugo
18:00	Fernando Seoane (yellow card) 17'; Jordi Calavera 48'; Joselu 61'; Sergio Gil (yellow card) 70'	Report	Urko Vera 88'	Stadium: Estadio Anxo Carro; Attendance: 3,617; Referee: (Spain) Saúl Ais

26 March 2017 31	Mirandés	1 – 3	Huesca	Miranda de Ebro
18:00	Urko Vera 45'; Marco Sangalli (yellow card) 56'; Íñigo Eguaras (yellow card) 59' (yellow-red card)	Report	Vinícius Araújo 5' 56'; Carlos David Moreno 28'; Carlos Akapo (yellow card) 82'	Stadium: Estadio Municipal de Anduva; Attendance: 3,092; Referee: (Spain) David Medié

1 April 2017 32	Levante	2 – 1	Mirandés	Valencia
16:00	Chema 10'; Saveljich (yellow card) 41'; Roger Martí 90+2' (pen.)	Report	Usero (yellow card) 51'; Marco Sangalli 65'; Carlos Moreno (yellow card) 89'; Kijera (yellow card) 90+1'; Rúper (yellow card) 90+1'; Daniel Provencio (red card) 90+1'	Stadium: Estadi Ciutat de València; Attendance: 12,378; Referee: (Spain) Guillermo Cuadra Fernández

7 April 2017 33	Mirandés	2 – 0	Alcorcón	Miranda de Ebro
20:00	Carlos Moreno (yellow card) 28'; Usero (yellow card) 34'; Urko Vera 64'; Íñigo Eguaras 76'; Álex García (yellow card) 81'	Report		Stadium: Estadio Municipal de Anduva; Attendance: 3,213; Referee: (Spain) Jorge Figueroa

15 April 2017 34	Gimnàstic de Tarragona	4 – 1	Mirandés	Tarragona
18:00	Zahibo (yellow card) 12'; Xavi Molina 39'; Tejera 68'; Lobato 71'; Emaná 88' (pen.)	Report	Guarrotxena (yellow card) 3'; Álex García 11'; Roberto (yellow card) 38'	Stadium: Nou Estadi de Tarragona; Attendance: 4,587; Referee: (Spain) Juan Pulido

23 April 2017 35	Mirandés	0 – 1	Real Zaragoza	Miranda de Ebro
16:00	Fran Cruz (yellow card) 17'; Álex García (yellow card) 28'	Report	Ángel 15'; Álvaro Ratón (yellow card) 76'; Jorge Pombo (yellow card) 77'; Cabrera (yellow card) 88'	Stadium: Estadio Municipal de Anduva; Attendance: 4,094; Referee: (Spain) Dámaso Arcediano

30 April 2017 36	Córdoba	1 – 1	Mirandés	Córdoba
18:00	Sergio Aguza (yellow card) 32'; José Antonio Caro 60'; Rodri (yellow card) 90+4'	Report	Guarrotxena (yellow card) 59'; Rúper (yellow card) 61'; Kijera (yellow card) 63'; Carlos Moreno (yellow card) 87'; Urko Vera 90+4'	Stadium: Estadio Nuevo Arcángel; Attendance: 10,399; Referee: (Spain) Eduardo Prieto

7 May 2017 37	Mirandés	0 – 1	Sevilla Atlético	Miranda de Ebro
16:00	Marco Sangalli (yellow card) 33'; Alain Oyarzun (yellow card) 78'	Report	David Carmona (yellow card) 58'; Bernardo (yellow card) 63'; Marc Gual 68'	Stadium: Estadio Municipal de Anduva; Attendance: 2,785; Referee: (Spain) Víctor Areces

13 May 2017 38	Elche	0 – 1	Mirandés	Elche
16:15	Borja Valle (yellow card) 45+3'; Álex (yellow card) 63'; Fabián (yellow card) 72'	Report	Urko Vera (red card) 40'; Daniel Provencio (yellow card) 41' (yellow-red card); Fran Cruz (yellow card) 54'; Rúper (yellow card) 73'; Kijera (yellow card) 81'; Roberto (yellow card) 82'; Carlos Moreno 90+1'	Stadium: Estadio Manuel Martínez Valero; Attendance: 14,482; Referee: (Spain) David Pérez

21 May 2017 39	Mirandés	2 – 2	Valladolid	Miranda de Ebro
12:00	Carlos Moreno (yellow card) 35'; Roberto (yellow card) 35' (yellow-red card); Íñigo Eguaras (yellow card) 53' (goal) 57' (pen.); Guarrotxena (yellow card) 57'; Fran Cruz (yellow card) 64'; Marco Sangalli (yellow card) 68'; Rúper (yellow card) 86'; Balbi 90+5' (o.g.)	Summary	José 15'; André Leão (yellow card) 21'; Raúl de Tomás 37' (pen.); Javi Moyano (yellow card) 68'	Stadium: Estadio Municipal de Anduva; Attendance: 3,985; Referee: (Spain) Aitor Gorostegui

27 May 2017 40	Almería	2 – 0	Mirandés	Almería
18:00	Quique 29' 82'; Fran Vélez (yellow card) 89'	Summary	Fran Cruz (yellow card) 57'; Kijera (yellow card) 87'	Stadium: Estadio de los Juegos Mediterráneos; Attendance: 7,550; Referee: (Spain) Javier Alberola

4 June 2017 41	Mirandés	2 – 2	Mallorca	Miranda de Ebro
20:00	Maikel Mesa 3'; Guarrotxena 34' (yellow card) 35'; Kijera (yellow card) 71'; Sergio Pérez (yellow card) 90+1'	Report	Culio 40'; Joan Oriol (yellow card) 83'; Lekić 87'	Stadium: Estadio Municipal de Anduva; Attendance: 1,601; Referee: (Spain) Juan Pulido

11 June 2017 42	Numancia	0 – 2	Mirandés	Soria
18:00		Report	Fran Cruz (yellow card) 21'; Maikel Mesa 87'; Pedro Martín 90+1'	Stadium: Nuevo Estadio Los Pajaritos; Attendance: 2,351; Referee: (Spain) Juan López

== Copa Del Rey ==
6 September 2016 Second Round	Mirandés	2 – 2 (a.e.t.) (3 – 4 p)	Elche	Miranda de Ebro
19:00	Marco Sangalli 26' (yellow card) 69'; Guarrotxena 59'	Report	Guillermo Fernández Hierro 18'; Nino 78'; Hugo Fraile (yellow card) 99'	Stadium: Estadio Municipal de Anduva; Referee: (Spain) Eduardo Prieto
