= List of Spanish football transfers summer 2015 =

This is a list of Spanish football transfers for the summer sale in the 2015–16 season of La Liga and Segunda División. Only moves from La Liga and Segunda División are listed.

The summer transfer window began on 1 July 2015, although a few transfers took place prior to that date. The window closed at midnight on 1 September 2015. Players without a club can join one at any time, either during or in between transfer windows. Clubs below La Liga level can also sign players on loan at any time. If needed, clubs can sign a goalkeeper on an emergency loan, if all others are unavailable.

== La Liga ==
=== Athletic Bilbao ===
Manager: (Spain) Ernesto Valverde (3rd season)

In:

Out:

Date	Name	Moving from	Fee
5 June 2015	(Spain) Eneko Bóveda	(Spain) SD Eibar	Free
5 June 2015	(Spain) Javier Eraso	(Spain) CD Leganés	Free
29 June 2015	(Spain) Sabin Merino	(Spain) Bilbao Athletic	Promoted
29 June 2015	(Spain) Iñigo Lekue	(Spain) Bilbao Athletic	Promoted
30 June 2015	(Spain) Jonás Ramalho	(Spain) Girona FC	Loan return
1 July 2015	(Spain) Gorka Elustondo	(Spain) Real Sociedad	Free
30 August 2015	(Spain) Raúl García	(Spain) Atlético Madrid	Undisclosed

Date	Name	Moving to	Fee
15 June 2015	(Spain) Andoni Iraola	(United States) NYC FC	Free
8 July 2015	(Spain) Unai Bustinza	(Spain) CD Leganés	Loan
12 July 2015	(Spain) Unai Albizua	(Spain) CD Leganés	Free
14 July 2015	(Spain) Gaizka Toquero	(Spain) Deportivo Alavés	Free
20 July 2015	(Spain) Kepa Arrizabalaga	(Spain) Real Valladolid	Loan
23 July 2015	(Spain) Erik Morán	(Spain) Real Zaragoza	Loan
11 August 2015	(Spain) Iñigo Ruiz de Galarreta	(Spain) CD Leganés	Loan
13 August 2015	(Spain) Guillermo Fernández	(Spain) CD Leganés	Loan
13 August 2015	(Spain) Jon Aurtenetxe	(Spain) CD Tenerife	Loan

=== Atlético Madrid ===
Manager: (Argentina) Diego Simeone (5th season)

In:

Out:

Date	Name	Moving from	Fee
22 June 2015	(Argentina) Luciano Vietto	(Spain) Villarreal CF	€20M
1 July 2015	(Colombia) Jackson Martínez	(Portugal) FC Porto	€35M
1 July 2015	(Spain) Óliver Torres	(Portugal) FC Porto	Loan return
1 July 2015	(Ghana) Thomas Partey	(Spain) UD Almería	Loan return
10 July 2015	(Belgium) Yannick Carrasco	(France) AS Monaco	€15M
20 July 2015	(Montenegro) Stefan Savić	(Italy) ACF Fiorentina	€12M + Mario Suárez
20 July 2015	(Brazil) Filipe Luís	(England) Chelsea F.C.	€16M
22 July 2015	(Ghana) Bernard Mensah	(Portugal) Vitória S.C.	€10M
10 August 2015	(France) Lucas Hernandez	(Spain) Atlético Madrid B	Promoted
28 August 2015	(Colombia) Rafael Santos Borré	(Colombia) Deportivo Cali	Undisclosed
28 August 2015	(Argentina) Matías Kranevitter	(Argentina) River Plate	€8M

Date	Name	Moving to	Fee
18 June 2015	(Croatia) Mario Mandžukić	(Italy) Juventus FC	€19M
22 June 2015	(Brazil) Léo Baptistão	(Spain) Villarreal CF	Loan
30 June 2015	(Spain) Cani	(Spain) Villarreal CF	Loan return
30 June 2015	(Argentina) Cristian Ansaldi	(Russia) FC Zenit Saint Petersburg	Loan return
30 June 2015	(Brazil) João Miranda	(Italy) Inter Milan	€15M
2 July 2015	(Portugal) André Moreira	(Portugal) C.F. União	Loan
2 July 2015	(Uruguay) Emiliano Velázquez	(Spain) Getafe CF	Loan
6 July 2015	(Turkey) Arda Turan	(Spain) FC Barcelona	€34M
8 July 2015	(Belgium) Toby Alderweireld	(England) Tottenham Hotspur	£11.5M
11 July 2015	(Argentina) Emiliano Insúa	(Germany) VfB Stuttgart	Undisclosed
15 July 2015	(Portugal) Sílvio	(Portugal) S.L. Benfica	Loan
15 July 2015	(Spain) Mario Suárez	(Italy) ACF Fiorentina	Part of swap deal (along with €12M) for Stefan Savić
22 July 2015	(Ghana) Bernard Mensah	(Spain) Getafe CF	Loan
23 July 2015	(Morocco) Bono	(Spain) Real Zaragoza	Loan
23 July 2015	(Uruguay) Cristian Rodríguez	(Argentina) Club Atlético Independiente	Free
24 July 2015	(Spain) Javier Manquillo	(France) Olympique de Marseille	Loan
31 July 2015	(Spain) Borja Bastón	(Spain) SD Eibar	Loan
1 August 2015	(Tunisia) Abdelkader Oueslati	(Tunisia) Club Africain	Free
8 August 2015	(Spain) Rubén Pérez	(Spain) Granada CF	Undisclosed
13 August 2015	(Mexico) Raúl Jiménez	(Portugal) S.L. Benfica	Undisclosed
28 August 2015	(Colombia) Rafael Santos Borré	(Colombia) Deportivo Cali	Loan
28 August 2015	(Argentina) Matías Kranevitter	(Argentina) River Plate	Loan
30 August 2015	(Spain) Raúl García	(Spain) Athletic Bilbao	Undisclosed

=== Barcelona ===
Manager: (Spain) Luis Enrique Martínez (2nd season)

In:

Out:

Date	Name	Moving from	Fee
8 June 2015	(Spain) Aleix Vidal	(Spain) Sevilla FC	€18M
6 July 2015	(Turkey) Arda Turan	(Spain) Atlético Madrid	€34M

Date	Name	Moving to	Fee
11 June 2015	(Spain) Xavi	(Qatar) Al Sadd SC	Free
25 June 2015	(Spain) Gerard Deulofeu	(England) Everton FC	€6M
1 July 2015	(Spain) Martín Montoya	(Italy) Inter Milan	Loan
27 July 2015	(Netherlands) Ibrahim Afellay	(England) Stoke City F.C.	Free
14 August 2015	(Spain) Adama Traoré	(England) Aston Villa	€10M
20 August 2015	(Spain) Pedro	(England) Chelsea F.C.	€27M + €3M on performances
21 August 2015	(Croatia) Alen Halilović	(Spain) Sporting de Gijón	Loan
29 August 2015	(Spain) Denis Suárez	(Spain) Villarreal CF	€3M
1 September 2015	(Cameroon) Alex Song	(England) West Ham United	Loan extended

=== Betis ===
Manager: (Spain) Pepe Mel (2nd season)

In:

Out:

Date	Name	Moving from	Fee
24 May 2015	(Spain) Francisco Portillo	(Spain) Málaga CF	€1,2M
9 June 2015	(Algeria) Foued Kadir	(France) Olympique de Marseille	€600K
12 June 2015	(Netherlands) Rafael van der Vaart	(Germany) Hamburger SV	Free
25 June 2015	(Brazil) Petros	(Brazil) SC Corinthians Paulista	€1,5M
1 July 2015	(Argentina) Germán Pezzella	(Argentina) River Plate	€2,25M
3 July 2015	(Egypt) Amro Aziz	(Egypt) El Gouna FC	€300K
7 July 2015	(Italy) Cristiano Piccini	(Italy) AC Fiorentina	€2,5M
7 July 2015	(France) Didier Digard	(France) OGC Nice	Free
6 August 2015	(Germany) Heiko Westermann	(Germany) Hamburger SV	Free
12 August 2015	(Peru) Juan Manuel Vargas	(Italy) ACF Fiorentina	Free
31 August 2015	(Spain) Joaquín	(Italy) ACF Fiorentina	€1M
31 August 2015	(Netherlands) Ricky van Wolfswinkel	(England) Norwich City F.C.	Loan

Date	Name	Moving to	Fee
28 June 2015	(Spain) Héctor Rodas	(Spain) Córdoba CF	Free
30 June 2015	(Spain) Juanfran	(England) Watford F.C.	£1.5M
8 July 2015	(Spain) Alex Alegría	(Spain) CD Numancia	Loan
9 July 2015	(Spain) Chuli	(Spain) UD Almería	€500K
20 July 2015	(Spain) Jorge Casado	(Spain) SD Ponferradina	Free
24 July 2015	(Spain) Sergio Rodríguez	(Spain) AD Alcorcón	Free
28 July 2015	(Spain) Dani Pacheco	(Spain) Deportivo Alavés	Loan
29 July 2015	(Portugal) Salvador Agra	(Portugal) CD Nacional	Free
11 August 2015	(Spain) Nono	(Spain) Elche CF	Free
18 August 2015	(Spain) Álex Martínez	(Spain) Elche CF	Loan
21 August 2015	(Spain) José Caro	(Spain) Elche CF	Loan
31 August 2015	(Chile) Lolo Reyes	(Spain) UD Almería	Loan

=== Celta Vigo ===
Manager: (Argentina) Eduardo Berizzo (2nd season)

In:

Out:

Date	Name	Moving from	Fee
18 June 2015	(Spain) Iago Aspas	(Spain) Sevilla FC	€5M
20 June 2015	(Denmark) Daniel Wass	(France) Evian TG	€2,9M
11 July 2015	(Sweden) John Guidetti	(England) Manchester City	Free
7 August 2015	(Serbia) Dejan Dražić	(Serbia) OFK Beograd	Undisclosed

Date	Name	Moving to	Fee
22 May 2015	(Spain) Borja Oubiña	Retired	
1 June 2015	(Denmark) Michael Krohn-Dehli	(Spain) Sevilla FC	Free
15 June 2015	(Brazil) Charles	(Spain) Málaga CF	€500K
3 July 2015	(Spain) Samuel Llorca	(Spain) Real Valladolid	Free
4 July 2015	(Spain) Santi Mina	(Spain) Valencia CF	€10M
9 July 2015	(Spain) Álex López	(England) Sheffield Wednesday	Loan
22 July 2015	(Argentina) Joaquín Larrivey	(United Arab Emirates) Baniyas SC	€2M
31 August 2015	(Spain) David Costas	(Spain) RCD Mallorca	Loan

=== Deportivo La Coruña ===
Manager: (Spain) Víctor Sánchez (2nd season)

In:

Out:

Date	Name	Moving from	Fee
19 June 2015	(Spain) Fernando Navarro	(Spain) Sevilla FC	Free
26 June 2015	(Spain) Alejandro Arribas	(Spain) Sevilla FC	Free
30 June 2015	(Spain) Saúl García	(Spain) Racing Santander	Loan return
30 June 2015	(Spain) Oriol Riera	(England) Wigan Athletic	Free
5 July 2015	(Spain) Luis Alberto	(England) Liverpool F.C.	Loan
16 July 2015	(Spain) Juanfran	(England) Watford F.C.	Loan
22 July 2015	(Brazil) Sidnei	(Portugal) S.L. Benfica	Loan
23 July 2015	(Spain) Cani	(Spain) Villarreal CF	Free
24 July 2015	(Spain) Pedro Mosquera	(Spain) Elche CF	Free
30 July 2015	(Argentina) Fede Cartabia	(Spain) Valencia CF	Loan
30 July 2015	(Spain) Lucas Pérez	(Greece) PAOK FC	€1.5M
6 August 2015	(Morocco) Fayçal Fajr	(Spain) Elche CF	Loan
20 August 2015	(Uruguay) Jonathan Rodríguez	(Portugal) S.L. Benfica	Loan
24 August 2015	(Spain) Manu	(Spain) Deportivo Alavés	Free
28 August 2015	(Portugal) Diogo Salomão	(Portugal) Sporting CP	Undisclosed
1 September 2015	(Argentina) Jonás Gutiérrez	(England) Newcastle United	Free

Date	Name	Moving to	Fee
30 June 2015	(Spain) Roberto Canella	(Spain) Sporting de Gijón	Loan Return
30 June 2015	(Portugal) Hélder Costa	(Portugal) S.L. Benfica	Loan return
30 June 2015	(Portugal) Ivan Cavaleiro	(Portugal) S.L. Benfica	Loan return
30 June 2015	(Argentina) Luis Fariña	(Portugal) S.L. Benfica	Loan return
30 June 2015	(Spain) José Rodríguez	(Spain) Real Madrid Castilla	Loan return
30 June 2015	(Spain) Borja López	(France) AS Monaco	Loan return
30 June 2015	(Spain) Isaac Cuenca	(Turkey) Bursaspor	Free
7 July 2015	(Poland) Cezary Wilk	(Spain) Real Zaragoza	Free
21 July 2015	(Spain) Diego Seoane	(Spain) SD Ponferradina	Free
29 July 2015	(Portugal) Hélder Postiga	(India) Atlético de Kolkata	Free
30 July 2015	(Spain) Toché	(Spain) Real Oviedo	Free
7 August 2015	(Spain) Luis Fernández	(Spain) SD Huesca	Loan
15 August 2015	(Spain) Pablo Insua	(Spain) CD Leganés	Loan
31 August 2015	(Spain) Bicho	(Spain) CD Leganés	Loan

=== Eibar ===
Manager: (Spain) José Luis Mendilibar (1st season)

In:

Out:

Date	Name	Moving from	Fee
9 July 2015	(Spain) Keko	(Spain) Albacete Balompié	Free
9 July 2015	(Spain) Antonio Luna	(England) Aston Villa F.C.	Free
10 July 2015	(Spain) Thaylor Lubanzadio	(Spain) Celta Vigo B	Free
10 July 2015	(Spain) Sergio García	(Spain) SD Leioa	Free
12 July 2015	(Azerbaijan) Eddy	(Spain) Real Murcia	Loan
12 July 2015	(Spain) Sergi Enrich	(Spain) CD Numancia	Free
17 July 2015	(Argentina) Gonzalo Escalante	(Italy) Calcio Catania	Loan
20 July 2015	(Spain) Iván Ramis	(Spain) Levante UD	Free
21 July 2015	(Argentina) Mauro dos Santos	(Spain) UD Almería	Free
28 July 2015	(Spain) Asier Riesgo	(Spain) CA Osasuna	Free
28 July 2015	(Spain) David Juncà	(Spain) Girona FC	Free
31 July 2015	(Spain) Borja Bastón	(Spain) Atlético Madrid	Loan
14 August 2015	(Spain) Adrián González	(Spain) Elche CF	Free
16 August 2015	(Italy) Simone Verdi	(Italy) A.C. Milan	Loan
20 August 2015	(Serbia) Aleksandar Pantić	(Spain) Villarreal CF	Loan
26 August 2015	(Japan) Takashi Inui	(Germany) Eintracht Frankfurt	€300K
31 August 2015	(Bosnia and Herzegovina) Izet Hajrović	(Germany) Werder Bremen	Loan

Date	Name	Moving to	Fee
5 June 2015	(Spain) Eneko Bóveda	(Spain) Athletic Club	Free
17 June 2015	(Spain) Borja Fernández	(India) Atlético de Kolkata	Free
18 June 2015	(Spain) Txema Añibarro	Retired	
25 June 2015	(Spain) Manu del Moral	(Spain) Sevilla FC	Loan return
30 June 2015	(Italy) Federico Piovaccari	(Italy) U.C. Sampdoria	Loan return
30 June 2015	(Spain) Raúl Navas	(Spain) Real Sociedad	Loan return
30 June 2015	(Spain) Abraham Minero	(Spain) Real Zaragoza	Loan return
30 June 2015	(Spain) Dídac Vilà	(Italy) AC Milan	Loan return
30 June 2015	(Ghana) Derek Boateng	Unattached	Free
30 June 2015	(Serbia) Dejan Lekić	Unattached	Free
13 July 2015	(Spain) Ángel Rodríguez	(Spain) Real Zaragoza	Free
15 July 2015	(Spain) Jon Irazusta	(Spain) Real Unión	Free
19 July 2015	(Spain) Javi Lara	(India) Atlético de Kolkata	Free
4 August 2015	(Spain) Sergio García	(Spain) Real Murcia	Loan
14 August 2015	(Spain) Julen Iriarte	(Spain) Real Unión	Loan
14 August 2015	(Spain) Aitor Ortega	(Spain) Barakaldo CF	Loan
26 August 2015	(Spain) Dani Nieto	(Greece) Skoda Xanthi	Free
28 August 2015	(Spain) Aitor Arregi	(Spain) La Roda CF	Free
31 August 2015	(Spain) Jon Errasti	(Italy) Spezia Calcio	Free

=== Espanyol ===
Manager: (Spain) Sergio González (2nd season)

In:

Out:

Date	Name	Moving from	Fee
5 June 2015	(Spain) Antonio Raillo	(Spain) RCD Espanyol B	Promoted
5 June 2015	(Spain) Joan Jordán	(Spain) RCD Espanyol B	Promoted
5 June 2015	(Spain) Marc Caballé	(Spain) RCD Espanyol B	Promoted
11 June 2015	(Spain) Rubén Duarte	(Spain) RCD Espanyol B	Promoted
12 June 2015	(Spain) Rober Correa	(Spain) RCD Espanyol B	Promoted
3 July 2015	(Spain) Burgui	(Spain) Real Madrid Castilla	Loan
3 July 2015	(Paraguay) Hernán Pérez	(Spain) Villarreal CF	Free
24 July 2015	(Italy) Francesco Bardi	(Italy) Inter Milan	Loan
31 July 2015	(Chile) Enzo Roco	(Chile) O'Higgins F.C.	Loan
13 August 2015	(Spain) Gerard Moreno	(Spain) Villarreal CF	Undisclosed
16 August 2015	(France) Michaël Ciani	(Portugal) Sporting CP	Free
20 August 2015	(Spain) Marco Asensio	(Spain) Real Madrid CF	Loan
31 August 2015	(Senegal) Papakouli Diop	(Spain) Levante UD	Free

Date	Name	Moving to	Fee
28 May 2015	(Brazil) Felipe Mattioni	Unaffiliated	Free
29 June 2015	(Spain) Sergio García	(Qatar) Al Rayyan SC	€1,5M
30 June 2015	(Spain) Lucas Vázquez	(Spain) Real Madrid	€1M
4 July 2015	(Spain) Manu Lanzarote	(Greece) Asteras Tripolis	Free
8 July 2015	(Spain) Sergio Tejera	(Spain) Gimnàstic Tarragona	Free
14 July 2015	(Uruguay) Christian Stuani	(England) Middlesbrough F.C.	€3M
15 July 2015	(Spain) Carlos Clerc	(Spain) Girona FC	Loan
17 July 2015	(Spain) Kiko Casilla	(Spain) Real Madrid	€6M
29 July 2015	(Spain) Jairo Morillas	(Spain) Girona FC	Loan
15 August 2015	(Mexico) Héctor Moreno	(Netherlands) PSV Eindhoven	€5M
18 August 2015	(Spain) Álex Fernández	(England) Reading F.C.	Loan
18 August 2015	(Spain) Germán Parreño	(Spain) Girona FC	Loan
19 August 2015	(Republic of the Congo) Thievy Bifouma	(Spain) Granada CF	Loan
24 August 2015	(Argentina) Diego Colotto	(India) FC Pune City	Free
31 August 2015	(Spain) Christian Alfonso	Unaffiliated	Free
31 August 2015	(Spain) Cristian Gómez	Unaffiliated	Free
31 August 2015	(Spain) Marc Caballé	(Spain) CD Lugo	Loan

=== Getafe ===
Manager: (Spain) Fran Escribá (1st season)

In:

Out:

Date	Name	Moving from	Fee
19 June 2015	(Spain) Carlos Vigaray	(Spain) Getafe CF B	Promoted
25 June 2015	(Spain) Juan Cala	(Spain) Granada CF	Free
2 July 2015	(Uruguay) Emiliano Velázquez	(Spain) Atlético Madrid	Loan
2 July 2015	(Spain) Álvaro Medrán	(Spain) Real Madrid Castilla	Loan
7 July 2015	(Uruguay) Damián Suárez	(Spain) Elche CF	Free
9 July 2015	(Spain) Moi Gómez	(Spain) Villarreal CF	Loan
15 July 2015	(Hungary) Balázs Megyeri	(Greece) Olympiacos	Free
16 July 2015	(Argentina) Santiago Vergini	(England) Sunderland A.F.C.	Loan
22 July 2015	(Ghana) Bernard Mensah	(Spain) Atlético Madrid	Loan
2 August 2015	(Spain) Víctor Rodríguez	(Spain) Elche CF	Loan
5 August 2015	(Brazil) Wanderson	(Belgium) Lierse S.K.	Free to "B" team
31 August 2015	(Serbia) Stefan Šćepović	(Scotland) Celtic F.C.	Loan

Date	Name	Moving to	Fee
11 June 2015	(Spain) Jordi Codina	(Cyprus) APOEL FC	Free
16 June 2015	(Spain) Ivi López	(Spain) Sevilla Atlético	Free
25 June 2015	(Senegal) Baba Diawara	(Spain) Sevilla FC	Loan return
30 June 2015	(Brazil) Naldo	(Italy) Udinese Calcio	Loan return
30 June 2015	(Colombia) Fredy Hinestroza	(Colombia) La Equidad	Loan return
30 June 2015	(Spain) Juan Valera	Unaffiliated	Free
30 June 2015	(Spain) Álvaro Arroyo	Unaffiliated	Free
6 July 2015	(Spain) Sergio Escudero	(Spain) Sevilla FC	€2,75M
9 July 2015	(Spain) Jonathan López	(Greece) Veria F.C.	Free
6 August 2015	(Spain) Diego Castro	(Australia) Perth Glory FC	Free

=== Granada ===
Manager: (Spain) José Ramón Sandoval (2nd season)

In:

Out:

Date	Name	Moving from	Fee
1 July 2015	(Spain) Édgar Méndez	(Spain) UD Almería	€800K
2 July 2015	(Gabon) Yrondu Musavu-King	(France) SM Caen	Free
13 July 2015	(Spain) Robert Ibáñez	(Spain) Valencia CF	Loan
13 July 2015	(Spain) Salva Ruiz	(Spain) Valencia CF	Loan
17 July 2015	(Spain) Andrés Fernández	(Portugal) FC Porto	Loan
23 July 2015	(Slovenia) Rene Krhin	(Italy) Inter Milan	€1.3M
5 August 2015	(Uruguay) Nico López	(Italy) Udinese	Loan
6 August 2015	(Portugal) Miguel Lopes	(Portugal) Sporting CP	Loan
8 August 2015	(Spain) Rubén Pérez	(Spain) Atlético Madrid	Undisclosed
10 August 2015	(Spain) David Lombán	(Spain) Elche CF	Free
19 August 2015	(Republic of the Congo) Thievy Bifouma	(Spain) RCD Espanyol	Loan
23 August 2015	(Croatia) Ivan Kelava	(Slovakia) Spartak Trnava	Loan return
27 August 2015	(Italy) Cristiano Biraghi	(Italy) Inter Milan	Loan
31 August 2015	(Brazil) Neuton	(Italy) Udinese Calcio	Loan
31 August 2015	(Brazil) Dória	(France) Olympique de Marseille	Loan

Date	Name	Moving to	Fee
17 June 2015	(Spain) Juan Carlos	(Portugal) S.C. Braga	Loan return
21 June 2015	(Spain) Alfredo Ortuño	(Spain) UD Las Palmas	€1M
25 June 2015	(Spain) Juan Cala	(Spain) Getafe CF	Free
30 June 2015	(Azerbaijan) Eddy	(Spain) Real Murcia	Loan return
30 June 2015	(Spain) Adrián Colunga	(England) Brighton & Hove Albion F.C.	Loan return
30 June 2015	(Portugal) Daniel Candeias	(Portugal) S.L. Benfica	Loan return
30 June 2015	(Guinea) Lass Bangoura	(Spain) Rayo Vallecano	Loan return
30 June 2015	(Cameroon) Allan Nyom	(Italy) Udinese Calcio	Loan return
3 July 2015	(Colombia) Jeison Murillo	(Italy) Inter Milan	€8M
9 July 2015	(Spain) Aridane Hernández	(Spain) Cádiz CF	Loan
14 July 2015	(Spain) Héctor Yuste	(Spain) RCD Mallorca	€800K
14 July 2015	(Honduras) Jona	(Spain) Albacete Balompié	Free
15 July 2015	(Spain) Josan	(Spain) AD Alcorcón	Free
17 July 2015	(Spain) Roberto	(Spain) CD Lugo	Free
21 July 2015	(Spain) Juanpe Ramírez	(Spain) Real Valladolid	Loan
21 July 2015	(Spain) Borja Gómez	(Spain) Real Oviedo	Free
21 July 2015	(Ghana) Mohammed Fatau	(Spain) UD Almería	Loan
22 July 2015	(Chile) Manuel Iturra	(Italy) Udinese Calcio	Free
27 July 2015	(Greece) Mavroudis Bougaidis	(Greece) Panthrakikos F.C.	Undisclosed
4 August 2015	(Colombia) Wilson Cuero	(Spain) Cádiz CF	Loan
5 August 2015	(Spain) Álvaro García	(Spain) Cádiz CF	Loan
6 August 2015	(Venezuela) Darwin Machís	(Spain) SD Huesca	Loan
7 August 2015	(Sweden) Daniel Larsson	(Turkey) Gaziantepspor	Undisclosed
13 August 2015	(Argentina) Diego Buonanotte	(Greece) AEK Athens F.C.	Undisclosed
23 August 2015	(Argentina) Emanuel Insúa	(Italy) Udinese Calcio	Undisclosed
24 August 2015	(Portugal) Luís Martins	(Spain) CA Osasuna	Loan
25 August 2015	(Spain) Oier	(Spain) Real Sociedad	Loan
31 August 2015	(Colombia) Jhon Córdoba	(Germany) FSV Mainz 05	Loan
31 August 2015	(Spain) Riki (footballer, born 1980)	(Spain) CD Guadalajara	Free

=== Las Palmas ===
Manager: (Spain) Paco Herrera (2nd season)

In:

Out:

Date	Name	Moving from	Fee
25 June 2015	(Argentina) Sergio Araujo	(Argentina) Boca Juniors	€2,5M
12 July 2015	(Spain) Javi Varas	(Spain) Real Valladolid	Free
13 July 2015	(Spain) Pedro Bigas	(Spain) RCD Mallorca	Free
14 July 2015	(Spain) Jonathan Viera	(Belgium) Standard Liège	€900K
24 July 2015	(Israel) Ofir Kriaf	(Israel) Beitar Jerusalem F.C.	Free
30 July 2015	(Brazil) Willian José	(Uruguay) Deportivo Maldonado	Loan
2 August 2015	(Paraguay) Antolín Alcaraz	(England) Everton F.C.	Free
7 August 2015	(Spain) Javier Garrido	(England) Norwich City F.C.	Free
26 August 2015	(Morocco) Nabil El Zhar	(Spain) Levante UD	Free
30 August 2015	(Ghana) Mubarak Wakaso	(Russia) Rubin Kazan	Loan

Date	Name	Moving to	Fee
2 July 2015	(Spain) Casto	(Spain) UD Almería	Free
17 July 2015	(Spain) Guzmán Casaseca	(Spain) Real Valladolid	Free
17 July 2015	(Spain) Alfredo Ortuño	(Spain) Real Zaragoza	Loan
18 July 2015	(Spain) Benja	(Spain) UE Llagostera	Free
21 July 2015	(Spain) Tyronne del Pino	(Spain) SD Huesca	Loan
22 July 2015	(Uruguay) Marcelo Silva	(Spain) Real Valladolid	Free
4 August 2015	(Spain) Héctor Figueroa	(Spain) SD Huesca	Loan
6 August 2015	(Spain) Christian Fernández	(Spain) SD Huesca	Loan
25 August 2015	(Spain) Jesús Valentín	(Spain) SD Huesca	Loan
26 August 2015	(Spain) José Artiles	(Spain) Racing de Santander	Loan
30 August 2015	(Spain) Leo	(Spain) CP Cacereño	Loan

=== Levante ===
Manager: (Spain) Lucas Alcaraz (2nd season)

In:

Out:

Date	Name	Moving from	Fee
2 June 2015	(Spain) Rubén	(Spain) UD Almería	Free
8 June 2015	(Spain) Verza	(Spain) UD Almería	Free
1 July 2015	(Spain) Roger	(Spain) Real Valladolid	Loan return
10 July 2015	(Algeria) Nabil Ghilas	(Portugal) FC Porto	Loan
26 July 2015	(Brazil) Deyverson	(Portugal) C.F. Os Belenenses	€2M
7 August 2015	(Spain) Ángel Trujillo	(Spain) UD Almería	Undisclosed
8 August 2015	(Morocco) Zou Feddal	(Italy) Parma F.C.	Free
13 August 2015	(Colombia) Jefferson Lerma	(Colombia) Atlético Huila	Loan
31 August 2015	(Spain) Diego Mariño	(Spain) Real Valladolid	Undisclosed

Date	Name	Moving to	Fee
11 June 2015	(Austria) Andreas Ivanschitz	(United States) Seattle Sounders FC	Free
11 June 2015	(Nigeria) Kalu Uche	Unattached	Free
25 June 2015	(Mali) Mohamed Sissoko	(China) Shanghai Shenhua	Free
5 July 2015	(Spain) David Barral	(United Arab Emirates) Al Dhafra SCC	Free
17 July 2015	(Spain) Víctor Pérez	(Spain) Real Valladolid	Loan return
20 July 2015	(Spain) Iván Ramis	(Spain) SD Eibar	Free
3 August 2015	(Greece) Loukas Vyntra	(Israel) Hapoel Tel Aviv F.C.	Free
19 August 2015	(Spain) Javi Jiménez	(Spain) Elche CF	Free
25 August 2015	(Brazil) Rafael Martins	(Portugal) Moreirense F.C.	Loan
26 August 2015	(Morocco) Nabil El Zhar	(Spain) UD Las Palmas	Free
31 August 2015	(Senegal) Papakouli Diop	(Spain) RCD Espanyol	Free
31 August 2015	(Spain) Jason	(Spain) Albacete Balompié	Loan

=== Málaga ===
Manager: (Spain) Javi Gracia (2nd season)

In:

Out:

Date	Name	Moving from	Fee
7 June 2015	(Portugal) Fábio Espinho	(Bulgaria) Ludogorets Razgrad	Free
15 June 2015	(Brazil) Charles	(Spain) Celta de Vigo	€500K
17 June 2015	(Spain) Juan Carlos	(Portugal) S.C. Braga	Loan
25 June 2015	(Morocco) Nordin Amrabat	(Turkey) Galatasaray SK	€3,5M
11 July 2015	(Morocco) Adnane Tighadouini	(Netherlands) NAC Breda	€800K
16 July 2015	(Croatia) Duje Čop	(Croatia) Dinamo Zagreb	Loan
21 July 2015	(Spain) Raúl Albentosa	(England) Derby County F.C.	Loan + Buy Option after season
26 August 2015	(Paraguay) Roque Santa Cruz	(Mexico) Cruz Azul	Loan
31 August 2015	(Morocco) Hachim Mastour	(Italy) AC Milan	Loan

Date	Name	Moving to	Fee
24 May 2015	(Spain) Francisco Portillo	(Spain) Real Betis	€1,2M
16 June 2015	(Argentina) Ezequiel Rescaldani	(Mexico) Puebla FC	Loan
16 June 2015	(Spain) Juanmi	(England) Southampton FC	€7M
18 June 2015	(Spain) Samu Castillejo	(Spain) Villarreal CF	€8M
18 June 2015	(Spain) Samuel García	(Spain) Villarreal CF	€8M
30 June 2015	(Spain) Luis Alberto	(England) Liverpool F.C.	Loan return
6 July 2015	(Spain) Sergio Sánchez	(Greece) Panathinaikos F.C.	Undisclosed
21 August 2015	(Panama) Roberto Chen	(Spain) Real Balompédica Linense	Loan
27 August 2015	(Ivory Coast) Bobley Anderson	(France) LB Châteauroux	Free

=== Rayo Vallecano ===
Manager: (Spain) Paco Jémez (4th season)

In:

Out:

Date	Name	Moving from	Fee
4 July 2015	(Mali) Ousseynou Cissé	(France) Dijon FCO	Free
6 July 2015	(Spain) Chechu Dorado	(Spain) Villarreal CF	Free
10 July 2015	(Portugal) Bebé	(Portugal) S.L. Benfica	Loan
14 July 2015	(Spain) Diego Llorente	(Spain) Real Madrid Castilla	Loan
21 July 2015	(China) Zhang Chengdong	(China) Beijing Guoan F.C.	Loan
25 July 2015	(Germany) Patrick Ebert	(Russia) FC Spartak Moscow	Free
6 August 2015	(Spain) Juan Carlos	(Spain) Córdoba CF	Undisclosed
13 August 2015	(Argentina) Luis Fariña	(Portugal) S.L. Benfica	Loan
20 August 2015	(Romania) Răzvan Raț	(Greece) PAOK FC	Free
31 August 2015	(Spain) Javi Guerra	(England) Cardiff City F.C.	Free
31 August 2015	(Spain) Pablo Hernández	Al-Arabi SC (Qatar)	Loan

Date	Name	Moving to	Fee
25 May 2015	(Spain) Alberto Bueno	(Portugal) FC Porto	Free
17 June 2015	(France) Gaël Kakuta	(England) Chelsea FC	Loan return
22 June 2015	(Brazil) Léo Baptistão	(Spain) Atlético Madrid	Loan return
22 June 2015	(Mexico) Javier Aquino	(Spain) Villarreal CF	Loan return
30 June 2015	(Argentina) Cristian Álvarez	(Argentina) San Lorenzo de Almagro	Loan return
30 June 2015	(Senegal) Abdoulaye Ba	(Portugal) FC Porto	Loan return
30 June 2015	(Portugal) Licá	(Portugal) FC Porto	Loan return
30 June 2015	(Argentina) Emiliano Insúa	(Spain) Atlético Madrid	Loan return
30 June 2015	(Ghana) Mohammed Fatau	(Spain) Granada CF	Loan return
4 July 2015	(Spain) Jorge Morcillo	(Spain) UD Almería	Free
6 August 2015	(Colombia) Johan Mojica	(Spain) Real Valladolid	Extended Loan
13 August 2015	(Spain) Álex Moreno	(Spain) Elche CF	Loan
26 August 2015	(Spain) Diego Aguirre	(Spain) Real Oviedo	Loan
31 August 2015	(Spain) Alejandro Pozuelo	(Belgium) KRC Genk	Free

=== Real Madrid ===
Manager: (Spain) Rafael Benítez (1st season)

In:

Out:

Date	Name	Moving from	Fee
5 June 2015	(Brazil) Casemiro	(Portugal) FC Porto	Loan return
30 June 2015	(Spain) Lucas Vázquez	(Spain) RCD Espanyol	€1M
30 June 2015	(Spain) Marco Asensio	(Spain) RCD Mallorca	€3.9M
30 June 2015	(Brazil) Danilo	(Portugal) FC Porto	€31.5M
1 July 2015	(Russia) Denis Cheryshev	(Spain) Villarreal CF	Loan return
17 July 2015	(Spain) Kiko Casilla	(Spain) RCD Espanyol	€6M
18 August 2015	(Croatia) Mateo Kovačić	(Italy) Inter Milan	€30M

Date	Name	Moving to	Fee
9 June 2015	(Germany) Sami Khedira	(Italy) Juventus FC	Free
30 June 2015	(Mexico) Javier Hernández	(England) Manchester United	Loan return
11 July 2015	(Spain) Iker Casillas	(Portugal) FC Porto	Free
3 August 2015	(Spain) Omar Mascarell	(Spain) Sporting de Gijón	Loan
7 August 2015	(Spain) Fernando Pacheco	(Spain) Deportivo Alavés	Undisclosed
20 August 2015	(Spain) Marco Asensio	(Spain) RCD Espanyol	Loan
26 August 2015	(Spain) Asier Illarramendi	(Spain) Real Sociedad	€16M
26 August 2015	(Portugal) Fábio Coentrão	(France) AS Monaco	Loan
27 August 2015	(Brazil) Lucas Silva	(France) Olympique de Marseille	Loan

=== Real Sociedad ===
Manager: (Scotland) David Moyes (2nd season)

In:

Out:

Date	Name	Moving from	Fee
30 June 2015	(Spain) Raúl Navas	(Spain) SD Eibar	Loan return
4 July 2015	(Spain) David Concha	(Spain) Racing Santander	€1M
4 July 2015	(Argentina) Gerónimo Rulli	(Argentina) Estudiantes La Plata	Loan
9 July 2015	(Serbia) Srđan Babić	(Serbia) Vojvodina	Free
13 July 2015	(Mexico) Diego Reyes	(Portugal) FC Porto	Loan
13 July 2015	(Portugal) Bruma	(Turkey) Galatasaray	Loan
27 July 2015	(Brazil) Jonathas de Jesus	(Spain) Elche CF	€7.2M
25 August 2015	(Spain) Oier	(Spain) Granada CF	Loan
26 August 2015	(Spain) Asier Illarramendi	(Spain) Real Madrid CF	€16M

Date	Name	Moving to	Fee
3 June 2015	(Spain) Eñaut Zubikarai	Unaffiliated	Free
26 June 2015	(Spain) Marco Sangalli	(Spain) CD Mirandés	Free
1 July 2015	(Spain) Gorka Elustondo	(Spain) Athletic Bilbao	Free
3 July 2015	(Uruguay) Diego Ifrán	(Uruguay) CA Peñarol	Free
6 July 2015	(Spain) Dani Estrada	(Spain) Deportivo Alavés	Free
9 July 2015	(Spain) Jon Gaztañaga	(Spain) CD Numancia	Loan
24 July 2015	(Iceland) Alfreð Finnbogason	(Greece) Olympiacos F.C.	Loan
3 August 2015	(Spain) Pablo Hervías	(Spain) Real Oviedo	Loan
10 August 2015	(Algeria) Liassine Cadamuro	Unaffiliated	Free
14 August 2015	(Spain) Iker Hernández	(Spain) Barakaldo CF	Loan
31 August 2015	(Spain) David Concha	(Spain) CD Numancia	Loan

=== Sevilla ===
Manager: (Spain) Unai Emery (3rd season)

In:

Out:

Date	Name	Moving from	Fee
1 June 2015	(Denmark) Michael Krohn-Dehli	(Spain) Celta de Vigo	Free
17 June 2015	(France) Gaël Kakuta	(England) Chelsea FC	€4,5M
1 July 2015	(France) Adil Rami	(Italy) AC Milan	€4M
3 July 2015	(Ukraine) Yevhen Konoplyanka	(Ukraine) Dnipro Dnipropetrovsk	Free
6 July 2015	(Spain) Sergio Escudero	(Spain) Getafe	€2,75M
9 July 2015	(France) Steven Nzonzi	(England) Stoke City	€10M
12 July 2015	(Italy) Ciro Immobile	(Germany) Borussia Dortmund	Loan
17 July 2015	(Brazil) Mariano Ferreira	(France) FC Bordeaux	€3M
30 July 2015	(Spain) Luismi	(Spain) Sevilla Atlético	Promoted
27 August 2015	(Spain) Fernando Llorente	(Italy) Juventus FC	Free
31 August 2015	(Italy) Marco Andreolli	(Italy) Inter Milan	Loan

Date	Name	Moving to	Fee
8 June 2015	(Spain) Aleix Vidal	(Spain) FC Barcelona	€18M
10 June 2015	(Cameroon) Stéphane M'Bia	(Turkey) Trabzonspor	Free
18 June 2015	(Spain) Iago Aspas	(Spain) Celta de Vigo	€5M
19 June 2015	(Spain) Fernando Navarro	(Spain) Deportivo La Coruña	Free
25 June 2015	(Spain) Gerard Deulofeu	(Spain) FC Barcelona	Loan return
26 June 2015	(Spain) Alejandro Arribas	(Spain) Deportivo La Coruña	Free
2 July 2015	(Colombia) Carlos Bacca	(Italy) A.C. Milan	€30M
7 July 2015	(Chile) Bryan Rabello	(Mexico) Santos Laguna	Free
9 July 2015	(Portugal) Diogo Figueiras	(Italy) Genoa CFC	Loan
9 July 2015	(Argentina) Mariano Barbosa	(Spain) Villarreal CF	Free
17 July 2015	(Spain) Javier Hervás	Unattached	Free
22 August 2015	(Romania) Raul Rusescu	(Turkey) Osmanlıspor	Free
24 August 2015	(Senegal) Baba Diawara	(Portugal) C.S. Marítimo	Free
27 August 2015	(Spain) Manu del Moral	(Spain) Real Valladolid	Free
29 August 2015	(Spain) Denis Suárez	(Spain) FC Barcelona	Loan return
29 August 2015	(Brazil) Cicinho	(Brazil) Esporte Clube Bahia	Free

=== Sporting Gijón ===
Manager: (Spain) Abelardo Fernández (3rd season)

In:

Out:

Date	Name	Moving from	Fee
30 June 2015	(Spain) Roberto Canella	(Spain) Deportivo de La Coruña	Loan return
10 July 2015	(Spain) Alberto Guitián	(Spain) Sporting de Gijón B	Promoted
3 August 2015	(Spain) Omar Mascarell	(Spain) Real Madrid C.F.	Loan
11 August 2015	(Paraguay) Antonio Sanabria	(Italy) A.S. Roma	Loan
21 August 2015	(Croatia) Alen Halilović	(Spain) FC Barcelona	Loan

Date	Name	Moving to	Fee
30 June 2015	(Spain) Iván Hernández	Retired	Free
30 June 2015	(Spain) Álex Serrano	(Spain) RCD Espanyol B	Free
23 July 2015	(Spain) Santi Jara	(Spain) Albacete Balompié	Free
31 August 2015	(Spain) Mandi	(Spain) Elche CF	Free

=== Valencia ===
Manager: (Portugal) Nuno Espírito Santo (2nd season)

In:

Out:

Date	Name	Moving from	Fee
25 May 2015	(Portugal) João Cancelo	(Portugal) S.L. Benfica	€15M
12 June 2015	(Portugal) André Gomes	(Portugal) S.L. Benfica	€15M
15 June 2015	(Spain) Rodrigo Moreno	(Portugal) S.L. Benfica	€30M
1 July 2015	(Spain) Álvaro Negredo	(England) Manchester City F.C.	€30M
4 July 2015	(Spain) Santi Mina	(Spain) Celta Vigo	€10M
6 July 2015	(Belgium) Zakaria Bakkali	(Netherlands) PSV Eindhoven	Free
15 July 2015	(Brazil) Danilo Barbosa	(Portugal) S.C. Braga	Loan + €15M Forced buy
21 July 2015	(Australia) Mathew Ryan	(Belgium) Club Brugge KV	€7M
27 August 2015	(Brazil) Aderlan Santos	(Portugal) S.C. Braga	€7,6M
29 August 2015	(Tunisia) Aymen Abdennour	(France) AS Monaco	€25M

Date	Name	Moving to	Fee
25 June 2015	(Brazil) Vinícius Araújo	(Brazil) Cruzeiro EC	Loan
30 June 2015	(Brazil) Filipe Augusto	(Portugal) Rio Ave F.C.	Loan return
1 July 2015	(Mexico) Andrés Guardado	(Netherlands) PSV Eindhoven	Undisclosed fee
1 July 2015	(Spain) Víctor Ruiz	(Spain) Villarreal CF	€2,7M
13 July 2015	(Spain) Robert Ibáñez	(Spain) Granada CF	Loan
13 July 2015	(Spain) Salva Ruiz	(Spain) Granada CF	Loan
30 July 2015	(Argentina) Fede Cartabia	(Spain) Deportivo La Coruña	Loan
20 August 2015	(Argentina) Nicolás Otamendi	(England) Manchester City F.C.	€45M

=== Villarreal ===
Manager: (Spain) Marcelino García Toral (3rd season)

In:

Out:

Date	Name	Moving from	Fee
17 June 2015	(France) Alphonse Areola	(France) Paris Saint-Germain	Loan
18 June 2015	(Spain) Samu Castillejo	(Spain) Málaga	€8M
18 June 2015	(Spain) Samuel García	(Spain) Málaga	€8M
22 June 2015	(Brazil) Léo Baptistão	(Spain) Atlético Madrid	Loan
1 July 2015	(Spain) Víctor Ruiz	(Spain) Valencia CF	€2,7M
9 July 2015	(Argentina) Mariano Barbosa	(Spain) Sevilla FC	Free
14 August 2015	(Spain) Roberto Soldado	(England) Tottenham Hotspur F.C.	£10M
19 August 2015	(Democratic Republic of the Congo) Cédric Bakambu	(Turkey) Bursaspor	Undisclosed
29 August 2015	(Spain) Denis Suárez	(Spain) FC Barcelona	€3M
31 August 2015	(Spain) Adrián	(Portugal) FC Porto	Loan
1 September 2015	(Italy) Daniele Bonera	(Italy) AC Milan	Free

Date	Name	Moving to	Fee
17 June 2015	(Nigeria) Ikechukwu Uche	(Mexico) Tigres UANL	Free
22 June 2015	(Mexico) Javier Aquino	(Mexico) Tigres UANL	Free
22 June 2015	(Argentina) Luciano Vietto	(Spain) Atlético Madrid	€20M
3 July 2015	(Paraguay) Hernán Pérez	(Spain) RCD Espanyol	Free
6 July 2015	(Spain) Chechu Dorado	(Spain) Rayo Vallecano	Free
9 July 2015	(Spain) Moi Gómez	(Spain) Getafe CF	Loan
9 July 2015	(Spain) Sergio Marcos	(Spain) CD Lugo	Loan
10 July 2015	(Spain) Juan Carlos	(Spain) Albacete Balompié	Free
15 July 2015	(Mexico) Giovani Dos Santos	(United States) LA Galaxy	US$7M
23 July 2015	(Spain) Cani	(Spain) Deportivo La Coruña	Free
13 August 2015	(Spain) Gerard Moreno	(Spain) RCD Espanyol	Undisclosed
20 August 2015	(Serbia) Aleksandar Pantić	(Spain) SD Eibar	Loan
27 August 2015	(Spain) Javier Espinosa	(Spain) Elche CF	Loan
31 August 2015	(Spain) Jonathan Pereira	Unattached	Free

== Segunda División ==
=== Alavés ===
Manager: (Spain) José Bordalás (1st season)

In:

Out:

Date	Name	Moving to	Fee
18 June 2015	(Spain) Pau Torres	(Spain) Lleida Esportiu	Free
30 June 2015	(Spain) Sergio Pelegrín	(Spain) Elche CF	Free
1 July 2015	(Spain) Javier Carpio	(Spain) SD Ponferradina	Free
2 July 2015	(Spain) Kiko Femenía	(Spain) AD Alcorcón	Free
4 July 2015	(Spain) Sergio Mora	(Spain) AD Alcorcón	Free
6 July 2015	(Spain) Dani Estrada	(Spain) Real Sociedad	Free
13 July 2015	(Uruguay) Facundo Guichón	(Spain) AD Alcorcón	Free
13 July 2015	(Spain) Aritz Borda	(Romania) FC Rapid București	Free
14 July 2015	(Spain) Gaizka Toquero	(Spain) Deportivo Alavés	Free
14 July 2015	(Spain) David Torres	(Greece) Platanias F.C.	Free
28 July 2015	(Spain) Dani Pacheco	(Spain) Real Betis	Loan
17 August 2015	(Bulgaria) Vladimir Gadzhev	(Bulgaria) PFC Levski Sofia	Free

Date	Name	Moving to	Fee
17 June 2015	(Spain) Unai Medina	(Spain) CD Numancia	Free
19 June 2015	(Spain) Daniel Toribio	(Spain) AD Alcorcón	Free
26 June 2015	(Spain) Marco Sangalli	(Spain) Real Sociedad	Loan return
26 June 2015	(Spain) Manu Fernández	Unattached	Free
26 June 2015	(Czech Republic) Jiří Jarošík	Unattached	Free
26 June 2015	(Spain) Migue	Unattached	Free
26 June 2015	(Spain) Xabier Castillo	Unattached	Free
26 June 2015	(Spain) Rafa García	Unattached	Free
26 June 2015	(Spain) Juanma	Unattached	Free
26 June 2015	(Serbia) Ranko Despotović	Unattached	Free
30 June 2015	(Spain) Sergio Tejera	(Spain) RCD Espanyol	Loan return
30 June 2015	(Spain) Manu Lanzarote	(Spain) RCD Espanyol	Loan return
12 July 2015	(Spain) Ernesto Galán	(Spain) CD Mirandés	Free
13 July 2015	(Spain) Ion Vélez	(Spain) CD Mirandés	Free
27 July 2015	(Spain) Toti	(Thailand) Bangkok Glass F.C.	Free

=== Albacete ===
Manager: (Spain) Luis César Sampedro (4th season)

In:

Out:

Date	Name	Moving from	Fee
7 July 2015	(Spain) Adrià Carmona	(Spain) RCD Espanyol B	Free
10 July 2015	(Spain) Juan Carlos	(Spain) Villarreal CF	Free
14 July 2015	(Honduras) Jona	(Spain) Granada CF	Free
17 July 2015	(Spain) David Córcoles	(Spain) Recreativo Huelva	Free
23 July 2015	(Spain) Santi Jara	(Spain) Albacete Balompié	Free

Date	Name	Moving to	Fee
6 July 2015	(Uruguay) Jorge Díaz	(Spain) Real Zaragoza	Free
7 July 2015	(Portugal) Thierry Moutinho	(Spain) RCD Mallorca	Free
9 July 2015	(Spain) Keko	(Spain) SD Eibar	Free
17 July 2015	(Spain) Carlos Moreno	(Spain) CD Mirandés	Free
21 July 2015	(Spain) Chumbi	(Spain) UE Llagostera	Free
29 July 2015	(Spain) Alberto Domínguez	Unattached	Free
29 July 2015	(Spain) Borja Navarro	Unattached	Free

=== Alcorcón ===
Manager: (Spain) Juan Ramón López Muñiz (1st season)

In:

Out:

Date	Name	Moving from	Fee
21 May 2015	(Romania) Răzvan Ochiroșii	(Spain) CD Guijuelo	Free
21 May 2015	(Spain) Marc Nierga	(Spain) CD Guijuelo	Free
10 June 2015	(Spain) Sergi Guardiola	(Spain) CD Eldense	Free
14 June 2015	(Spain) Juan José Collantes	(Spain) CE Sabadell FC	Free
16 June 2015	(Spain) Ramiro Mayor	(Spain) Real Valladolid B	Free
19 June 2015	(Spain) Daniel Toribio	(Spain) Deportivo Alavés	Free
3 July 2015	(Spain) Dani Jiménez	(Spain) SD Huesca	Free
15 July 2015	(Spain) Josan	(Spain) Granada CF	Free
17 July 2015	(Spain) José Campaña	(Italy) U.C. Sampdoria	Loan
24 July 2015	(Spain) Sergio Rodríguez	(Spain) Real Betis	Free
27 July 2015	(Serbia) Marko Dmitrović	(England) Charlton Athletic F.C.	Loan
30 July 2015	(Portugal) Nélson Marcos	(Portugal) C.F. Os Belenenses	Free

Date	Name	Moving to	Fee
29 June 2015	(Spain) Héctor Verdés	(Spain) Real Oviedo	Free
30 June 2015	(Ivory Coast) Bobley Anderson	(Spain) Málaga CF	Loan return
30 June 2015	(Spain) Alberto Escassi	(Spain) UE Llagostera	Free
30 June 2015	(Spain) José Betancort	Unaffiliated	Free
30 June 2015	(Spain) Javi Jiménez	(Spain) Levante UD	Loan return
30 June 2015	(Spain) Fernando Usero	(Greece) Asteras Tripolis	Loan return
30 June 2015	(Spain) Fran Cruz	(Spain) Córdoba CF	Loan return
2 July 2015	(Spain) Kiko Femenía	(Spain) Deportivo Alavés	Free
4 July 2015	(Spain) Sergio Mora	(Spain) Deportivo Alavés	Free
11 July 2015	(Spain) Ángel	(Spain) CD Guijuelo	Free
13 July 2015	(Uruguay) Facundo Guichón	(Spain) Deportivo Alavés	Free
24 July 2015	(Spain) Dani Ponce	(Spain) CD Guadalajara	Loan

=== Almería ===
Manager: (Spain) Sergi Barjuan (2nd season)

In:

Out:

Date	Name	Moving from	Fee
8 June 2015	(Spain) Iago Díaz	(Spain) CD Lugo	Free
14 June 2015	(Spain) Jośe Ángel	(Spain) UD Almería B	Promoted
14 June 2015	(Spain) Iván Sánchez	(Spain) UD Almería B	Promoted
14 June 2015	(Spain) Míchel Zabaco	(Spain) UD Almería B	Promoted
14 June 2015	(Spain) Antonio Puertas	(Spain) UD Almería B	Promoted
19 June 2015	(Spain) Antonio Marín	(Spain) UD Almería B	Promoted
30 June 2015	(Spain) Ángel Montoro	(Spain) Recreativo Huelva	Free
1 July 2015	(Bosnia and Herzegovina) Eldin Hadžić	(Spain) Real Zaragoza	Free
2 July 2015	(Spain) Casto	(Spain) UD Las Palmas	Free
4 July 2015	(Spain) Jorge Morcillo	(Spain) Rayo Vallecano	Free
9 July 2015	(Spain) Chuli	(Spain) UD Almería	€500K
21 July 2015	(Ghana) Mohammed Fatau	(Spain) Granada CF	Loan
10 August 2015	(Spain) Carlos Cuéllar	(England) Norwich City F.C.	Free
16 August 2015	(Spain) Cristian Herrera	(Spain) Elche CF	Free

Date	Name	Moving to	Fee
2 June 2015	(Spain) Rubén	(Spain) Levante UD	Free
8 June 2015	(Spain) Verza	(Spain) Levante UD	Free
24 June 2015	(Israel) Tomer Hemed	(England) Brighton & Hove Albion	£1M
8 June 2015	(Spain) José Manuel Casado	Unattached	Free
8 June 2015	(Spain) Mané	Unattached	Free
30 June 2015	(Ghana) Thomas Partey	(Spain) Atlético Madrid	Loan Return
30 June 2015	(Spain) Javier Espinosa	(Spain) Villarreal CF	Loan Return
30 June 2015	(Brazil) Wellington Silva	(England) Arsenal F.C.	Loan Return
30 June 2015	(Republic of the Congo) Thievy Bifouma	(Spain) RCD Espanyol	Loan Return
1 July 2015	(Spain) Édgar Méndez	(Spain) Granada CF	€800K
21 July 2015	(Argentina) Mauro dos Santos	(Spain) SD Eibar	Free

=== Bilbao Athletic ===
Manager: (Spain) José Ángel Ziganda (5th season)

In:

Out:

Date	Name	Moving to	Fee
30 June 2015	(Spain) Julen Arellano	(Spain) FC Barcelona Juvenil A	Free
30 June 2015	(Spain) Enric Saborit	(Spain) RCD Mallorca	Loan return
30 June 2015	(Spain) Iker Guarrotxena	(Spain) CD Tenerife	Loan return

Date	Name	Moving to	Fee
30 June 2015	(Spain) Mikel Juaristi	Unattached	Free
4 July 2015	(Spain) Néstor Salinas	(Spain) CD Mirandés	Free

=== Córdoba ===
Manager: (Spain) José Luis Oltra (1st season)

In:

Out:

Date	Name	Moving from	Fee
15 June 2015	(Serbia) Saša Marković	(Serbia) FK Partizan	Free
28 June 2015	(Spain) Héctor Rodas	(Spain) Real Betis	Free
11 July 2015	(Chile) Jean Paul Pineda	(Chile) Unión La Calera	Free
16 July 2015	(Spain) Nando García	(Spain) Valencia CF Mestalla	Loan
17 July 2015	(Spain) Víctor Pérez	(Spain) Real Valladolid	Loan
18 July 2015	(Spain) Domingo Cisma	(Spain) Elche CF	Free
29 July 2015	(Ghana) Brimah Razak	(Spain) CD Mirandés	Free

Date	Name	Moving to	Fee
30 June 2015	(Argentina) Bruno Zuculini	(England) Manchester City F.C.	Loan return
30 June 2015	(Slovenia) Rene Krhin	(Italy) Inter Milan	Loan return
30 June 2015	(Portugal) Bebé	(Portugal) S.L. Benfica	Loan return
30 June 2015	(Algeria) Nabil Ghilas	(Portugal) FC Porto	Loan return
30 June 2015	(Spain) Borja García	(Spain) Real Madrid Castilla	Loan return
30 July 2015	(Argentina) Fede Cartabia	(Spain) Valencia CF	Loan return
3 July 2015	(Spain) Iago Bouzón	(Spain) Gimnàstic Tarragona	Free
3 July 2015	(Spain) Eduard Campabadal	(Spain) RCD Mallorca	Free
13 July 2015	(Spain) Abel Gómez	(Spain) Cádiz CF	Free
14 July 2015	(Spain) Íñigo López	(Spain) SD Huesca	Free
23 July 2015	(Spain) Mikel Saizar	(Cyprus) AEK Larnaca F.C.	Free
27 July 2015	(Spain) José Ángel Crespo	(England) Aston Villa F.C.	Undisclosed
30 July 2015	(Spain) Daniel Pinillos	(England) Nottingham Forest F.C.	Free

=== Elche ===
Manager: (Spain) Rubén Baraja (1st season)

In:

Out:

Date	Name	Moving to	Fee
24 June 2015	(Poland) Przemysław Tytoń	(Netherlands) PSV Eindhoven	Loan return
30 June 2015	(Croatia) Mario Pašalić	(England) Chelsea FC	Loan return
30 June 2015	(Chile) Enzo Roco	(Chile) CD Universidad Católica	Loan return
30 June 2015	(Spain) Sergio Pelegrín	(Spain) Deportivo Alavés	Free
7 July 2015	(Uruguay) Damián Suárez	(Spain) Getafe CF	Free
13 July 2015	(Spain) Manu Herrera	(Spain) Real Zaragoza	Free
18 July 2015	(Spain) Domingo Cisma	(Spain) Córdoba CF	Free
24 July 2015	(Spain) Pedro Mosquera	(Spain) Deportivo La Coruña	Free
27 July 2015	(Spain) David Lombán	Unattached	Free
27 July 2015	(Brazil) Jonathas de Jesus	(Spain) Real Sociedad	€7.2M
16 August 2015	(Spain) Cristian Herrera	(Spain) UD Almería	Free

=== Gimnàstic ===
Manager: (Spain) Vicente Moreno (3rd season)

In:

Out:

Date	Name	Moving from	Fee
3 July 2015	(Spain) Iago Bouzón	(Spain) Córdoba CF	Free
3 July 2015	(Spain) Xisco Hernández	(Spain) Reus Deportiu	Free
5 July 2015	(Spain) Moussa	(Spain) CE L'Hospitalet	€70K
6 July 2015	(Spain) Fali	(Spain) Huracán Valencia	Free
7 July 2015	(Spain) José Manuel García Naranjo	(Spain) Recreativo de Huelva	Free
8 July 2015	(Spain) Sergio Tejera	(Spain) RCD Espanyol	Free
8 July 2015	(Spain) Miguel Palanca	(Australia) Adelaide United	Free
16 July 2015	(Israel) Gal Arel	(Israel) Hapoel Be'er Sheva	Free
26 July 2015	(Spain) Álex López	(Spain) Valencia CF Mestalla	Free

Date	Name	Moving to	Fee
30 June 2015	(Spain) Sergio Rodríguez	(Spain) Real Betis	Loan return
21 July 2015	(Spain) Iván Aguilar	(Spain) UCAM Murcia CF	Loan
22 July 2015	(Ivory Coast) Lago Junior	(Spain) CD Mirandés	Free

=== Girona ===
Manager: (Spain) Pablo Machín (2nd season)

In:

Out:

Date	Name	Moving from	Fee
17 June 2015	(Spain) Rubén Alcaraz	(Spain) CE L'Hospitalet	Free
11 July 2015	(Spain) Marcelo Djaló	(Italy) Juventus FC	Loan
15 July 2015	(Spain) Carlos Clerc	(Spain) RCD Espanyol	Loan
20 July 2015	(Spain) David Oliveros	(Spain) Real Madrid Juvenil	Free
24 July 2015	(Spain) Kiko Olivas	(Spain) CE Sabadell FC	Free
29 July 2015	(Spain) Jairo Morillas	(Spain) RCD Espanyol	Loan

Date	Name	Moving to	Fee
17 June 2015	(Spain) Gerard Bordas	Unattached	Free
17 June 2015	(Spain) Juanlu Hens	Unattached	Free
17 June 2015	(Spain) David García	Unattached	Free
11 July 2015	(Spain) Marc Rovirola	(Spain) UE Llagostera	Free
13 July 2015	(Spain) Ayub El Harrak	(Spain) Marbella FC	Loan
28 July 2015	(Spain) David Juncà	(Spain) SD Eibar	Free

=== Huesca ===
Manager: (Spain) Luis Tevenet (2nd season)

In:

Out:

Date	Name	Moving to	Fee
10 July 2015	(Spain) Óscar Whalley	(Spain) Real Zaragoza	Loan
14 July 2015	(Spain) Íñigo López	(Spain) Córdoba CF	Free
16 July 2015	(France) Franck-Yves Bambock	(France) PSG Academy	Free
21 July 2015	(Spain) Tyronne del Pino	(Spain) UD Las Palmas	Loan
22 July 2015	(Spain) Óscar Ramírez	(Spain) SD Ponferradina	Free
24 July 2015	(Argentina) Leo Franco	(Argentina) San Lorenzo de Almagro	Free

Date	Name	Moving to	Fee
30 June 2015	(Spain) Gaspar Gálvez	Unattached	Free
30 June 2015	(Spain) Josan	(Spain) Granada CF	Loan return
3 July 2015	(Spain) Dani Jiménez	(Spain) AD Alcorcón	Free
9 July 2015	(Spain) Pablo Pallarès	(Spain) UCAM Murcia CF	Free
23 July 2015	(Italy) Francesco Scardina	Unattached	Free

=== Leganés ===
Manager: (Spain) Asier Garitano (3rd season)

In:

Out:

Date	Name	Moving to	Fee
3 July 2015	(Spain) Jon Ander Serantes	(Spain) CD Lugo	Free
3 July 2015	(Spain) Lluís Sastre	(Spain) Real Valladolid	Free
6 July 2015	(Spain) Jorge Miramón	(Spain) Lleida Esportiu	Free
7 July 2015	(Spain) Antonio Arranz	(Spain) Rayo Vallecano B	Free
8 July 2015	(Spain) Unai Bustinza	(Spain) Athletic Bilbao	Loan
10 July 2015	(Spain) Toni Dovale	(Spain) CD Lugo	Free
12 July 2015	(Spain) Unai Albizua	(Spain) Athletic Bilbao	Free
28 July 2015	(Spain) Juanan	(Spain) Recreativo Huelva	Free
29 July 2015	(Argentina) Alexander Szymanowski	(Denmark) Brøndby IF	Free

Date	Name	Moving to	Fee
5 June 2015	(Spain) Javier Eraso	(Spain) Athletic Club	Free
26 June 2015	(Spain) Marc Bertrán	(Spain) Recreativo Huelva	Loan return
29 June 2015	(Senegal) Pape Diamanka	(Spain) Real Zaragoza	Free
30 June 2015	(Spain) Erik Morán	(Spain) Athletic Bilbao	Loan return
30 June 2015	(Chile) Bryan Rabello	(Spain) Sevilla FC	Loan return
30 June 2015	(Spain) Chuli	(Spain) Real Betis	Loan return
20 July 2015	(Spain) Sergio Postigo	(Italy) Spezia Calcio 1906	€300K

=== Llagostera ===
Manager: (Spain) Lluís Carrillo (2nd season)

In:

Out:

Date	Name	Moving from	Fee
30 June 2015	(Spain) Alberto Escassi	(Spain) AD Alcorcón	Free
2 July 2015	(Spain) Emilio Sánchez	(Spain) CD Mirandés	Free
11 July 2015	(Spain) Marc Rovirola	(Spain) Girona CF	Free
14 July 2015	(Spain) Juanto Ortuño	(Spain) UCAM Murcia CF	Free
18 July 2015	(Spain) Benja	(Spain) UD Las Palmas	Free
21 July 2015	(Spain) Chumbi	(Spain) Albacete Balompié	Free
27 July 2015	(Spain) Chus Herrero	(Spain) Real Valladolid	Free

Date	Name	Moving to	Fee
9 July 2015	(Spain) Marc Vallhonesta	Unattached	Free

=== Lugo ===
Manager: (Spain) Luis Milla (1st season)

In:

Out:

Date	Name	Moving to	Fee
23 June 2015	(Spain) Igor Martínez	(Spain) CD Mirandés	Free
3 July 2015	(Spain) Antonio Campillo	(Spain) Rayo Vallecano B	Free
4 July 2015	(Spain) Carlos Hernández	(Spain) CE Sabadell	Free
5 July 2015	(Spain) Mario Barco	(Spain) Barakaldo CF	Free
9 July 2015	(Spain) Sergio Marcos	(Spain) Villarreal CF	Loan
13 July 2015	(Spain) Abel Molinero	(Spain) CD Guadalajara	Free
17 July 2015	(Cameroon) Serge Leuko	(Spain) Valencia CF Mestalla	Free
17 July 2015	(Spain) Álvaro Lemos	(Spain) SD Compostela	Free
17 July 2015	(Spain) Roberto	(Spain) Granada CF	Free

Date	Name	Moving to	Fee
5 June 2015	(Spain) Iago Díaz	(Spain) UD Almería	Free
30 June 2015	(Spain) Diego Seoane	(Spain) Deportivo La Coruña	Loan return
30 June 2015	(Spain) Luis Fernández	(Spain) Deportivo La Coruña	Loan return
30 June 2015	(Spain) Pelayo Novo	(Spain) Elche CF	Loan return
30 June 2015	(Spain) Borja Gómez	(Spain) Granada CF	Loan return
30 June 2015	(Spain) Lolo Plá	(Portugal) S.L. Benfica B	Loan return
30 June 2015	(Spain) David Aganzo	Unattached	Free
30 June 2015	(Spain) Dani Mallo	Unattached	Free
30 June 2015	(Spain) Álvaro Peña	Unattached	Free
30 June 2015	(Spain) Jonatan Valle	Unattached	Free
30 June 2015	(Spain) Ernesto Gómez	Unattached	Free
3 July 2015	(Spain) Jon Ander Serantes	(Spain) CD Leganés	Free
3 July 2015	(Spain) Manuel Pavón	(Spain) SD Ponferradina	Free
10 July 2015	(Spain) Toni Dovale	(Spain) CD Leganés	Free
15 July 2015	(Spain) Víctor Marco	(Spain) Huracán Valencia	Free

=== Mallorca ===
Manager: (Spain) Albert Ferrer (1st season)

In:

Out:

Date	Name	Moving from	Fee
25 June 2015	(Germany) Timon Wellenreuther	(Germany) Schalke 04	Loan
3 July 2015	(Spain) Eduard Campabadal	(Spain) RCD Mallorca	Free
4 July 2015	(Spain) Joan Oriol	(Romania) FC Rapid București	Free
6 July 2015	(Spain) Biel Company	(Spain) RCD Mallorca B	Promoted
6 July 2015	(Spain) Sergio Cortés	(Spain) RCD Mallorca B	Promoted
7 July 2015	(Portugal) Thierry Moutinho	(Spain) Albacete Balompié	Free
14 July 2015	(Spain) Héctor Yuste	(Spain) Granada CF	€800K
14 July 2015	(Brazil) Hugo Gomes	(Brazil) São Paulo FC	Loan
17 July 2015	(Brazil) Luis Carioca	(Brazil) Grêmio FPA	Loan
17 July 2015	(Brazil) Lima	(Brazil) Grêmio FPA	Loan
29 July 2015	(Argentina) Lucas Aveldaño	(Argentina) CA Belgrano	Loan
30 July 2015	(Paraguay) Javier Acuña	(Paraguay) Club Olimpia	Loan

Date	Name	Moving to	Fee
30 June 2015	(Spain) Marco Asensio	(Spain) Real Madrid	€3,9M
30 June 2015	(Spain) Josep Lluis Martí	Unaffiliated	Free
30 June 2015	(Spain) Enric Saborit	(Spain) Bilbao Athletic	Loan return
2 July 2015	(Spain) Rubén Miño	(Spain) Real Oviedo	Free
6 July 2015	(Spain) Albert Riera	Unattached	Free
9 July 2015	(Brazil) João Victor	(Cyprus) Anorthosis Famagusta	Free
13 July 2015	(Spain) Pedro Bigas	(Spain) UD Las Palmas	Free
24 July 2015	(Serbia) Nikola Gulan	(Belgium) Royal Mouscron-Péruwelz	Undisclosed
30 July 2015	(Spain) Cristian Bustos	(India) Mumbai City FC	Free

=== Mirandés ===
Manager: (Spain) Carlos Terrazas (3rd season)

In:

Out:

Date	Name	Moving from	Fee
26 June 2015	(Spain) Marco Sangalli	(Spain) Real Sociedad	Free
1 July 2015	(Spain) Raúl Fernández	(Spain) Real Valladolid	Free
3 July 2015	(Spain) Abdón Prats	(Spain) CD Tenerife	Free
4 July 2015	(Spain) Néstor Salinas	(Spain) Bilbao Athletic	Free
12 July 2015	(Spain) Ernesto Galán	(Spain) Deportivo Alavés	Free
13 July 2015	(Spain) Ion Vélez	(Spain) Deportivo Alavés	Free
16 July 2015	(Spain) Carlos Lázaro	(Spain) Hércules CF	Free
17 July 2015	(Spain) Íñigo Eguaras	(Spain) CE Sabadell FC	Free
17 July 2015	(Spain) Carlos Moreno	(Spain) Albacete Balompié	Free
22 July 2015	(Ivory Coast) Lago Junior	(Spain) CD Mirandés	Free

Date	Name	Moving to	Fee
23 June 2015	(Spain) Igor Martínez	(Spain) CD Lugo	Free
30 June 2015	(Spain) Jordi Pablo	Unattached	Free
30 June 2015	(Spain) Aitor Fernández	Unattached	Free
30 June 2015	(Spain) César Caneda	Unattached	Free
30 June 2015	(Spain) José Antonio Espín	Unattached	Free
30 June 2015	(Spain) Juanjo Serrano	Unattached	Free
30 June 2015	(Spain) Asier Barahona	Unattached	Free
30 June 2015	(Spain) Borja Docal	Unattached	Free
1 July 2015	(Spain) Pedro Martín	(Spain) CD Tenerife	Free
2 July 2015	(Spain) Emilio Sánchez	(Spain) UE Llagostera	Free
20 July 2015	(Spain) Urko Vera	(South Korea) Jeonbuk Hyundai Motors FC	Free
29 July 2015	(Ghana) Brimah Razak	(Spain) Córdoba CF	Free

=== Numancia ===
Manager: (Spain) Jagoba Arrasate (1st season)

In:

Out:

Date	Name	Moving from	Fee
10 June 2015	(Spain) Dani Aquino	(Spain) Atlético Madrid B	Free
17 June 2015	(Spain) Unai Medina	(Spain) Deportivo Alavés	Free
3 July 2015	(Spain) Pedro Orfila	(Spain) Racing Santander	Free
8 July 2015	(Spain) Alex Alegría	(Spain) Real Betis	Loan
9 July 2015	(Spain) Jon Gaztañaga	(Spain) Real Sociedad	Loan
15 July 2015	(Spain) Óscar Díaz	(Spain) Real Valladolid	Free
28 July 2015	(Spain) Marc Mateu	(Spain) Villarreal CF B	Free

Date	Name	Moving to	Fee
25 June 2015	(Brazil) Cicinho	(Spain) Sevilla FC	Loan return
12 July 2015	(Spain) Sergi Enrich	(Spain) SD Eibar	Free
17 July 2015	(Spain) Ito	(Spain) Barakaldo CF	Free
27 July 2015	(Spain) David Martín	(Spain) Barakaldo CF	Free

=== Osasuna ===
Manager: (Spain) Enrique Martín Monreal (2nd season)

In:

Out:

Date	Name	Moving from	Fee
26 June 2015	(Spain) Adrián Cruz	(Spain) Racing Ferrol	Free
2 July 2015	(Spain) Álex Sánchez	(Spain) CD Tudelano	Free
8 July 2015	(Dominican Republic) Tano Bonnín	(Spain) Villarreal CF B	Free
26 July 2015	(Spain) Nauzet Pérez	(Spain) CE Sabadell FC	Free
30 July 2015	(Montenegro) Bogdan Milić	(Montenegro) FK Mladost Podgorica	Loan

Date	Name	Moving to	Fee
30 June 2015	(Democratic Republic of the Congo) Cedrick Mabwati	(United States) Columbus Crew SC	Loan return
30 June 2015	(Spain) Ion Echaide	Unattached	Free
30 June 2015	(Spain) Pablo Hervías	(Spain) Real Sociedad	Loan return
30 June 2015	(Algeria) Liassine Cadamuro	(Spain) Real Sociedad	Loan return
2 July 2015	(Cameroon) Raoul Loé	(Qatar) Al-Sailiya SC	Free
5 July 2015	(Iran) Javad Nekounam	(Iran) Saipa FC	Free
13 July 2015	(Chile) Francisco Silva	(Mexico) Chiapas F.C.	Undisclosed
17 July 2015	(Montenegro) Nikola Vujadinović	(China) Beijing BG	Free
18 July 2015	(Spain) Jokin Ezkieta	(Spain) FC Barcelona B	Free
23 July 2015	(Spain) Sisi	(South Korea) Suwon FC	Free
24 July 2015	(Spain) Roberto Santamaría	(Spain) SD Ponferradina	Free
28 July 2015	(Spain) Asier Riesgo	(Spain) SD Eibar	Free

=== Oviedo ===
Manager: (Argentina) Sergio Egea (2nd season)

In:

Out:

Date	Name	Moving from	Fee
25 June 2015	(Spain) Carlos Peña	(Spain) Real Valladolid	Free
29 June 2015	(Spain) Héctor Verdés	(Spain) AD Alcorcón	Free
2 July 2015	(Spain) Rubén Miño	(Spain) RCD Mallorca	Free
13 July 2015	(Spain) Edu Bedia	(Germany) TSV 1860 München	Free
21 July 2015	(Spain) Borja Gómez	(Spain) Granada CF	Free
30 July 2015	(Spain) Toché	(Spain) Deportivo La Coruña	Free

Date	Name	Moving to	Fee
12 June 2015	(Spain) Sergio Sánchez	(Spain) SD Compostela	Free
1 July 2015	(England) Charlie I'Anson	(Spain) Elche CF	Loan return

=== Ponferradina ===
Manager: (Spain) José Manuel Díaz (2nd season)

In:

Out:

Date	Name	Moving from	Fee
3 July 2015	(Spain) Dani Suárez	(Spain) Real Madrid Castilla	Free
3 July 2015	(Spain) Manuel Pavón	(Spain) CD Lugo	Free
20 July 2015	(Spain) Jorge Casado	(Spain) Real Betis	Free
21 July 2015	(Spain) Diego Seoane	(Spain) Deportivo La Coruña	Free
23 July 2015	(Albania) Vullnet Basha	(Switzerland) FC Sion	Free
24 July 2015	(Spain) Roberto Santamaría	(Spain) CA Osasuna	Free
28 July 2015	(Liberia) William Jebor	(Portugal) Rio Ave F.C.	Loan
30 July 2015	(Spain) Ignasi Miquel	(England) Norwich City F.C.	Free

Date	Name	Moving to	Fee
30 June 2015	(Spain) Tete	(Spain) Real Murcia	Loan return
30 June 2015	(Spain) Kepa Arrizabalaga	(Spain) Athletic Bilbao	Loan return
1 July 2015	(Spain) Javier Carpio	(Spain) Deportivo Alavés	Free
22 July 2015	(Spain) Óscar Ramírez	(Spain) SD Huesca	Free

=== Tenerife ===
Manager: (Spain) Raül Agné (2nd season)

In:

Out:

Date	Name	Moving from	Fee
30 June 2015	(Spain) Nano	(Spain) CE L'Hospitalet	Loan return
30 June 2015	(Spain) Jairo Izquierdo	(Spain) Real Murcia	Loan return
30 June 2015	(Spain) Abel Suárez	(Spain) La Roda CF	Loan return
30 June 2015	(Spain) Alberto Jiménez	(Spain) Valencia Mestalla	Loan return
30 June 2015	(Spain) Ángel Galván	(Spain) Racing Ferrol	Loan return
1 July 2015	(Spain) Pedro Martín	(Spain) CD Mirandés	Free
10 July 2015	(Spain) Germán Sánchez	(Spain) UE Olot	Free

Date	Name	Moving to	Fee
30 June 2015	(Spain) Unai Albizua	(Spain) Athletic Bilbao	Loan return
30 June 2015	(Spain) Iker Guarrotxena	(Spain) Athletic Bilbao	Loan return
30 June 2015	(Uruguay) Diego Ifrán	(Spain) Real Sociedad	Loan return
30 June 2015	(Uruguay) Maxi Pérez	(Uruguay) CA Fénix	Loan return
30 June 2015	(Spain) Igor Arnáez	Unattached	Free
30 June 2015	(Spain) Hugo Álvarez	Unattached	Free
30 June 2015	(Spain) Cristo Martín	Unattached	Free
30 June 2015	(Spain) Juan Carlos Real	Unattached	Free
3 July 2015	(Spain) Abdón Prats	(Spain) CD Mirandés	Free
6 July 2015	(Spain) Aridane Santana	(Thailand) Bangkok Glass F.C.	Free
28 July 2015	(Spain) Cristo Díaz	(Spain) Algeciras CF	Loan
29 July 2015	(Spain) Carlos Abad	(Spain) Real Madrid Castilla	Loan

=== Valladolid ===
Manager: (Spain) Gaizka Garitano (1st season)

In:

Out:

Date	Name	Moving from	Fee
2 July 2015	(Spain) Juan Villar	(Spain) Cádiz CF	Free
3 July 2015	(Spain) Samuel Llorca	(Spain) Celta Vigo	Free
16 July 2015	(Spain) Mario Hermoso	(Spain) Real Madrid C	Loan
17 July 2015	(Spain) Guzmán Casaseca	(Spain) UD Las Palmas	Free
21 July 2015	(Spain) Kepa Arrizabalaga	(Spain) Athletic Bilbao	Loan
21 July 2015	(Spain) Juanpe Ramírez	(Spain) Granada CF	Loan
22 July 2015	(Uruguay) Marcelo Silva	(Spain) UD Las Palmas	Free

Date	Name	Moving to	Fee
25 June 2015	(Spain) Carlos Peña	(Spain) Real Oviedo	Free
30 June 2015	(Paraguay) Hernán Pérez	(Spain) Villarreal CF	Loan return
1 July 2015	(Spain) Raúl Fernández	(Spain) CD Mirandés	Free
3 July 2015	(Spain) Marc Valiente	(Israel) Maccabi Haifa F.C.	€250K
3 July 2015	(Spain) Lluís Sastre	(Spain) CD Leganés	Free
12 July 2015	(Spain) Javi Varas	(Spain) UD Las Palmas	Free
15 July 2015	(Spain) Óscar Díaz	(Spain) CD Numancia	Free
17 July 2015	(Spain) Víctor Pérez	(Spain) Córdoba CF	Loan
23 July 2015	(Morocco) Zakarya Bergdich	(England) Charlton Athletic F.C.	Undisclosed
27 July 2015	(Spain) Chus Herrero	(Spain) UE Llagostera	Free

=== Zaragoza ===
Manager: (Serbia) Ranko Popović (2nd season)

In:

Out:

Date	Name	Moving from	Fee
26 June 2015	(Spain) Marc Bertrán	(Spain) Recreativo Huelva	Free
29 June 2015	(Senegal) Pape Diamanka	(Spain) CD Leganés	Free
2 July 2015	(Japan) Aria Jasuru Hasegawa	(Japan) Cerezo Osaka	Free
6 July 2015	(Uruguay) Jorge Díaz	(Spain) Albacete Balompié	Free
6 July 2015	(Spain) Isaac Carcelén	(Spain) Real Betis B	Free
7 July 2015	(Poland) Cezary Wilk	(Spain) Deportivo La Coruña	Free
13 July 2015	(Spain) Manu Herrera	(Spain) Elche CF	Free
13 July 2015	(Spain) Ángel Rodríguez	(Spain) SD Eibar	Free
17 July 2015	(Spain) Alfredo Ortuño	(Spain) UD Las Palmas	Loan
23 July 2015	(Morocco) Bono	(Spain) Atlético Madrid	Loan
23 July 2015	(Spain) Erik Morán	(Spain) Athletic Bilbao	Loan

Date	Name	Moving to	Fee
29 June 2015	(Spain) Lucas Porcar	Unattached	Free
30 June 2015	(Albania) Vullnet Basha	(Switzerland) FC Sion	Loan return
30 June 2015	(Brazil) Willian José	(Uruguay) Deportivo Maldonado	Loan
1 July 2015	(Bosnia and Herzegovina) Eldin Hadžić	(Spain) UD Almería	Free
10 July 2015	(Spain) Óscar Whalley	(Spain) SD Huesca	Loan
