= Ramón Juan =

Spanish footballer

Personal information
- Full name: Ramón Juan Ramírez
- Date of birth: 10 December 1999 (age 26)
- Place of birth: Barcelona, Spain
- Height: 1.81 m (5 ft 11 in)
- Position: Goalkeeper

Team information
- Current team: Ibiza
- Number: 1

Youth career
- 2012–2018: Cornellà

Senior career*
Years	Team	Apps	(Gls)
2018–2021	Cornellà	82	(0)
2021–2024	Mirandés	47	(0)
2024–	Ibiza	65	(0)
- * Club domestic league appearances and goals as of 10 June 2026

Ramón Juan Ramírez (born 10 December 1999), known as Ramón Juan, is a Spanish footballer who plays as a goalkeeper for Ibiza.

== Club career ==
=== Cornellà ===
Born in Barcelona, Catalonia, Ramón Juan was an UE Cornellà youth graduate. He made his first team debut at the age of just 18 on 29 April 2018, coming on as a second-half substitute for outfield player Marc Caballé in a 1–1 Segunda División B away draw against SCR Peña Deportiva, after Carlos Craviotto was sent off.

Ramón Juan started the 2018–19 campaign as a first-choice ahead of new signing Sergio Pérez, and remained an undisputed starter afterwards. In the 2020–21 Copa del Rey, he impressed in matches against La Liga sides Atlético Madrid and FC Barcelona; against the former, he kept a clean sheet in the 1–0 win, and against the latter, he saved two penalty kicks and led the side to an extra time, where Cornellà ultimately lost by 2–0.

=== Mirandés ===
On 11 June 2021, Ramón Juan signed a two-year contract with Segunda División side CD Mirandés. He made his debut for the club on 1 December 2021, starting in a 3–0 away win over CD San Roque de Lepe in the season's Copa del Rey.

Ramón Juan made his professional debut on 16 December 2021, starting in a 2–1 win at CD Lugo, also in the national cup.
