= Carlos Abad =

Spanish footballer (born 1995)

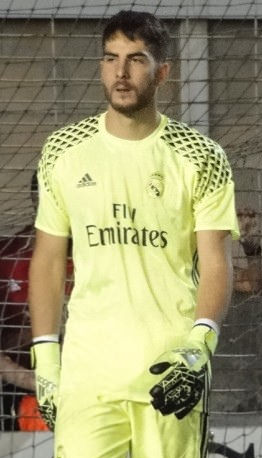
- Carlos Abad playing for Castilla in 2016

Personal information
- Full name: Carlos Javier Abad-Hernández Trujillo
- Date of birth: 28 June 1995 (age 31)
- Place of birth: Puerto de la Cruz, Spain
- Height: 1.93 m (6 ft 4 in)
- Position: Goalkeeper

Team information
- Current team: Hércules
- Number: 1

Youth career
- 2008–2009: El Peñón
- 2009–2014: Tenerife
- 2009–2010: → El Peñón (loan)
- 2011–2012: → Realejos (loan)

Senior career*
Years	Team	Apps	(Gls)
2014–2015	Tenerife B	8	(0)
2014–2020	Tenerife	13	(0)
2015–2017	→ Real Madrid B (loan)	67	(0)
2018–2019	→ Córdoba (loan)	28	(0)
2019–2020	→ Xanthi (loan)	28	(0)
2020–2021	Deportivo La Coruña	14	(0)
2021–2022	Atlético Baleares	0	(0)
2022–	Hércules	130	(0)
- * Club domestic league appearances and goals as of 10 June 2026

Carlos Javier Abad-Hernández Trujillo (born 28 June 1995) is a Spanish professional footballer who plays as a goalkeeper for Hércules.

== Club career ==
Born in Puerto de la Cruz, Santa Cruz de Tenerife, Canary Islands, Abad graduated from CD Tenerife's youth setup. He made his debut as a senior with the reserves in the 2013 – 14 campaign in Tercera División, while still a junior.

Initially a fourth-choice goalkeeper at the start of the 2014 – 15, Abad profited from Jacobo Sanz's departure and Nauzet Santana's serious injury, being promoted to Roberto's backup. On 16 November 2014, he played his first match as a professional, replacing the latter due to injury in a 0 – 2 away loss against UE Llagostera in the Segunda División championship.

On 24 July 2015, Abad extended his contract with the Blanquiazules until 2020, and was loaned to Real Madrid Castilla five days later, for two years. He returned to the Blanquiazules for the 2017–18 campaign, but acted as a backup to Dani Hernández. On 23 August 2018, he was loaned to fellow second division side Córdoba CF, and became a first-choice player mainly due to the club's poor financial situation.

On 3 July 2019, Abad extended his contract until 2022 and was immediately loaned to Super League Greece side Xanthi for one year. He finished the season by being the goalkeeper who made more saves in the league, making 70 saves (four more than Asteras Tripolis' Nikos Papadopoulos), conceding only 27 goals, and picking up six clean sheets.

On 3 September 2020, Abad joined recently relegated side Deportivo de La Coruña on a two-year deal.

On 26 July 2022, Carlos Abad joined the Spanish team side Hércules Club de Fútbol on a two-year deal.

On May 5, 2024, Hércules CF was crowned champion of Group III of the Segunda Federación after defeating Lleida Esportiu at the Estadio José Rico Pérez, in front of more than 20,000 fans who witnessed a historic match for the club. In this way, Abad achieved promotion to the Primera Federación after two seasons with the Alicante club.

== Career statistics ==
=== Club ===
As of match played 23 May 2026

Club	Season	League			Cup		Continental		Other		Total	
Club	Season	Division	Apps	Goals	Apps	Goals	Apps	Goals	Apps	Goals	Apps	Goals
Tenerife	2014–15	Segunda División	9	0	0	0	—		—		9	0
Tenerife	2017–18	Segunda División	4	0	4	0	—		—		8	0
Tenerife	Total		13	0	4	0	—		—		17	0
Real Madrid B (loan)	2015–16	Segunda División B	40	0	0	0	—		—		40	0
Real Madrid B (loan)	2016–17	Segunda División B	27	0	0	0	—		—		27	0
Real Madrid B (loan)	Total		67	0	0	0	—		—		67	0
Córdoba (loan)	2017–18	Segunda División	28	0	1	0	—		—		29	0
Xanthi (loan)	2019–20	Super League Greece	28	0	0	0	—		—		28	0
Deportivo A Coruña	2020–21	Segunda División B	14	0	1	0	—		—		15	0
Atlético Baleares	2021–22	Primera División RFEF	0	0	1	0	—		—		1	0
Hércules	2022–23	Segunda Federación	32	0	0	0	—		—		32	0
Hércules	2023–24	Segunda Federación	34	0	0	0	—		—		34	0
Hércules	2024–25	Primera Federación	36	0	0	0	—		—		36	0
Hércules	2025–26	Primera Federación	28	0	—		—		—		28	0
Hércules	Total		130	0	0	0	—		—		130	0
Career total			280	0	7	0	0	0	0	0	287	0
