= Rúper =

Spanish footballer

Personal information
- Full name: Roberto López Esquiroz
- Date of birth: 4 June 1987 (age 39)
- Place of birth: Estella, Spain
- Height: 1.80 m (5 ft 11 in)
- Position: Defensive midfielder

Team information
- Current team: Izarra
- Number: 22

Youth career
- Izarra
- Osasuna

Senior career*
Years	Team	Apps	(Gls)
2006–2009	Osasuna B	68	(5)
2009–2013	Osasuna	32	(0)
2011–2012	→ Elche (loan)	19	(2)
2012–2013	→ Mirandés (loan)	27	(2)
2013–2014	Sabadell	3	(0)
2014	Jaén	3	(0)
2014–2019	Mirandés	150	(4)
2019	→ Tudelano (loan)	17	(0)
2019–	Izarra	157	(3)
- * Club domestic league appearances and goals as of 15 June 2025

Roberto López Esquiroz (born 4 June 1987), commonly known as Rúper, is a Spanish professional footballer who plays for CD Izarra as a defensive midfielder.

== Club career ==
Rúper was born in Estella-Lizarra, Navarre. A product of CA Osasuna's youth ranks, he made his first-team debut on 26 April 2009, playing the last two minutes of a 0–0 away draw against Real Valladolid. During his first full season, as they easily avoided La Liga relegation, he provided rest for longtime incumbent holding midfielder Francisco Puñal (12 years his senior).

Rúper spent 2011–12 on loan to Elche CF of Segunda División, appearing in less than half of the games during the campaign – 12 starts, 1,190 minutes of action. He was released by Osasuna in the summer of 2013 after a loan to CD Mirandés in the same league, and continued competing at that level with CE Sabadell FC, Real Jaén and Mirandés again.

Rúper signed for CD Tudelano on 17 January 2019, on a six-month loan. In the ensuing off-season, the free agent joined his former youth club CD Izarra also in the third tier.

== Career statistics ==
As of match played 14 March 2021

Appearances and goals by club, season and competition
Club	Season	League			National Cup		Other		Total	
Club	Season	Division	Apps	Goals	Apps	Goals	Apps	Goals	Apps	Goals
Osasuna B	2006–07	Segunda División B	24	1	—		—		24	1
Osasuna B	2007–08	Segunda División B	12	0	—		2 (Note: Appearance(s) in Relegation play-off)	0	14	0
Osasuna B	2008–09	Segunda División B	32	4	—		—		32	4
Osasuna B	Total		68	5	0	0	2	0	70	5
Osasuna	2008–09	La Liga	1	0	0	0	—		1	0
Osasuna	2009–10	La Liga	27	0	6	0	—		33	0
Osasuna	2010–11	La Liga	4	0	1	0	—		5	0
Osasuna	Total		32	0	7	0	0	0	39	0
Elche (loan)	2011–12	Segunda División	19	2	2	0	—		21	2
Mirandés (loan)	2012–13	Segunda División	27	2	2	0	—		29	2
Sabadell	2013–14	Segunda División	3	0	0	0	—		3	0
Jaén	2013–14	Segunda División	3	0	0	0	—		3	0
Mirandés	2014–15	Segunda División	40	2	1	0	—		41	2
Mirandés	2015–16	Segunda División	40	0	3	0	—		43	0
Mirandés	2016–17	Segunda División	29	0	1	0	—		30	0
Mirandés	2017–18	Segunda División B	33	2	2	0	4 (Note: Appearance(s) in Promotion Playoffs)	0	39	2
Mirandés	2018–19	Segunda División B	8	0	1	0	—		9	0
Mirandés	Total		150	4	8	0	4	0	162	4
Mirandés	Total Mirandés		177	6	10	0	4	0	191	6
Tudelano (loan)	2018–19	Segunda División B	17	0	0	0	—		17	0
Izarra	2019–20	Segunda División B	20	0	0	0	—		20	0
Izarra	2020–21	Segunda División B	12	1	0	0	—		12	1
Izarra	Total		32	1	0	0	0	0	32	1
Career total			351	14	19	0	6	0	376	14
