= Sergio Rodríguez (footballer, born 1992) =

Spanish footballer

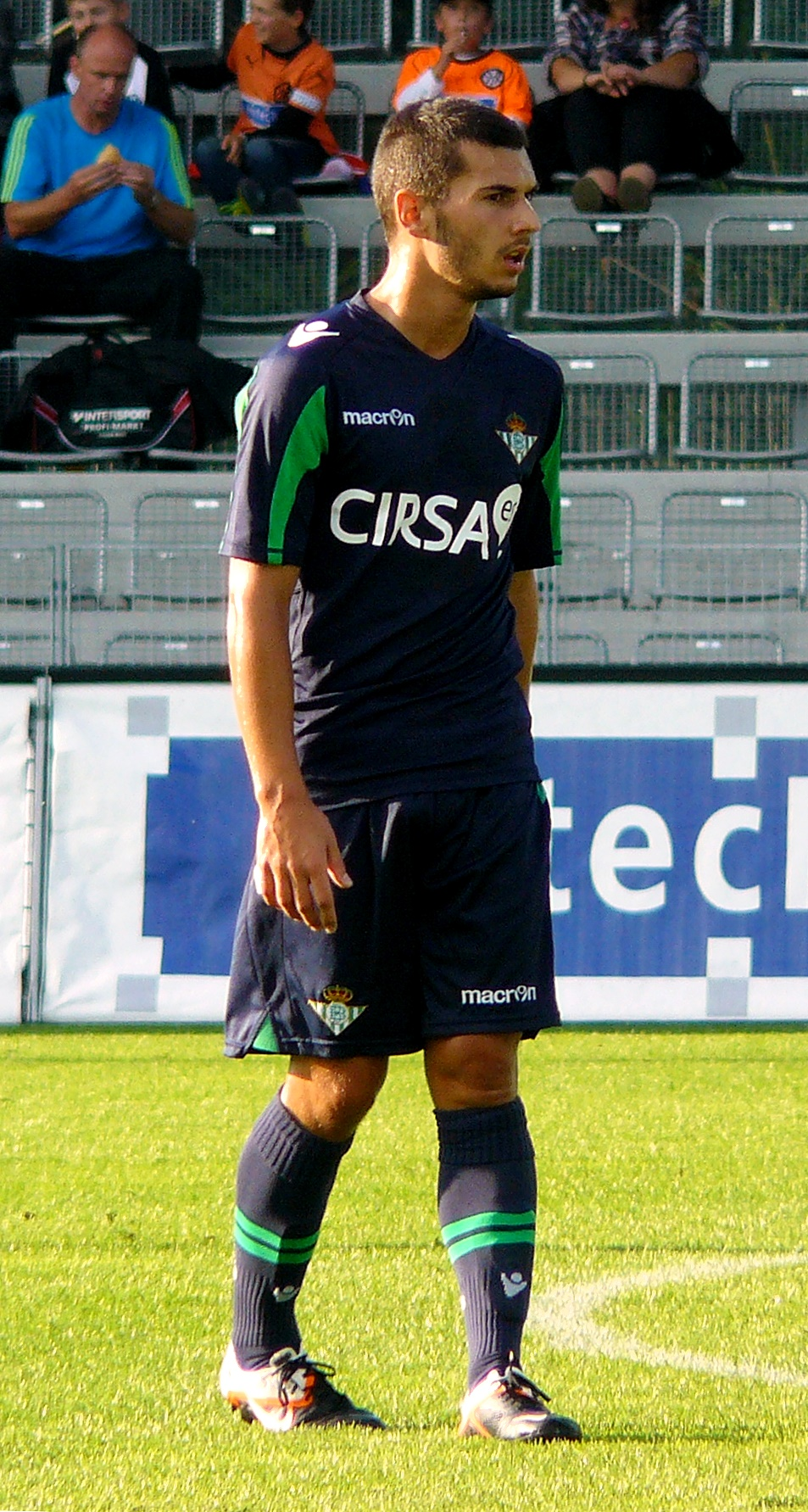
- Sergio training with Betis in 2012

Personal information
- Full name: Sergio Rodríguez Hurtado
- Date of birth: 7 September 1992 (age 34)
- Place of birth: Seville, Spain
- Height: 1.70 m (5 ft 7 in)
- Position: Winger

Youth career
- Betis

Senior career*
Years	Team	Apps	(Gls)
2011–2014	Betis B	42	(11)
2011–2015	Betis	6	(0)
2014	→ Lugo (loan)	11	(1)
2015	→ Gimnàstic (loan)	8	(0)
2015–2016	Alcorcón	0	(0)
2016–2017	La Roda	8	(1)
2017	Arcos	5	(0)
2017–2018	San Roque	30	(6)
2019–2020	Sant Julià	18	(2)
2020–2021	Gerena	26	(4)
2021–2022	Lora	19	(3)
- * Club domestic league appearances and goals as of 18:08, 19 April 2024 (UTC)

Sergio Rodríguez Hurtado (born 7 September 1992) is a Spanish footballer who plays as a winger.

== Club career ==
Born in Seville, Andalusia, Rodríguez graduated from Real Betis' youth setup. On 21 May 2011, before even having appearing for the reserves, he played his first match as a professional, coming on as a late substitute in a 3–1 Segunda División home win against SD Huesca.

Rodríguez was definitely promoted to the B team in the summer of 2011, and made his La Liga debut on 22 September, again coming from the bench in a 4–3 home victory over Real Zaragoza. On 16 July 2013, he signed a new four-year contract with the club.

On 22 January 2014, Rodríguez was loaned to Segunda División side CD Lugo until the end of the season. He returned to the Estadio Benito Villamarín in July, being assigned to the main squad.

On 2 February 2015, after making no appearances during the campaign, Rodríguez was loaned to Gimnàstic de Tarragona from Segunda División B until June. He was released by Betis after his loan ended, and subsequently joined AD Alcorcón on 25 July.

Rodríguez spent the following seasons in lower league or amateur football. He also played in the Andorran Primera Divisió, with UE Sant Julià.
