= Sergio Pérez (footballer, born 1993) =

Spanish footballer

Personal information
- Full name: Sergio Pérez Leyva
- Date of birth: 15 May 1993 (age 33)
- Place of birth: Vitoria-Gasteiz, Spain
- Height: 1.85 m (6 ft 1 in)
- Position: Goalkeeper

Team information
- Current team: Villanovense

Youth career
- Alavés

Senior career*
Years	Team	Apps	(Gls)
2012–2013	Alavés B	21	(0)
2013–2016	Mirandés B	83	(0)
2014–2018	Mirandés	30	(0)
2018–2019	Cornellà	4	(0)
2019–2020	Burgos Promesas	6	(0)
2020–2021	Toledo	16	(0)
2021–2022	Conquense	22	(0)
2022–2023	Calvo Sotelo	30	(0)
2023–2025	Tarancón	66	(0)
2025–	Villanovense	7	(0)
- * Club domestic league appearances and goals as of 9 November 2025

Sergio Pérez Leyva (born 15 May 1993) is a Spanish footballer who plays for Tercera Federación club Villanovense as a goalkeeper.

== Football career ==
Born in Vitoria-Gasteiz, Álava, Basque Country, Pérez was a graduate of Deportivo Alavés' youth setup, and made his senior debut with the reserves in the 2012–13 campaign, in the Tercera División. On 28 November 2012, he was named on the substitutes' bench with the main squad for the match against FC Barcelona, but remained unused in the Copa del Rey 1–3 away loss.

In June 2013, Pérez moved to another reserve team, CD Mirandés B in the regional leagues. On 28 September 2014, he appeared in his first game with the main squad, starting in a 0–2 away loss against Real Betis in the Segunda División.

Pérez was promoted to the first team ahead of the 2015–16 season, but remained as a backup for Raúl Fernández. After the latter's departure to Levante UD, he was made a starter ahead of the new signing Roberto Gutiérrez, but the campaign ended in relegation.
