= Fran Cruz =

Spanish footballer

Personal information
- Full name: Francisco de Paula Pablo Cruz Torres
- Date of birth: 22 June 1991 (age 35)
- Place of birth: Córdoba, Spain
- Height: 1.84 m (6 ft 0 in)
- Position: Centre-back

Team information
- Current team: Atlético Palma Río

Youth career
- Córdoba

Senior career*
Years	Team	Apps	(Gls)
2008–2013	Córdoba B	125	(0)
2012–2015	Córdoba	30	(0)
2014–2015	→ Alcorcón (loan)	12	(0)
2015–2016	Llagostera	16	(0)
2016	Rapid București	17	(1)
2016–2017	Mirandés	37	(1)
2017–2018	Lorca	36	(2)
2018–2019	Miedź Legnica	8	(0)
2018–2019	Miedź Legnica II	3	(0)
2019–2021	Extremadura	59	(3)
2022–2023	Cultural Leonesa	23	(0)
2024–	Atlético Palma Río	51	(1)
- * Club domestic league appearances and goals as of 22:07, 3 May 2026 (UTC)

Francisco 'Fran' de Paula Pablo Cruz Torres (born 22 June 1991) is a Spanish professional footballer who plays as a central defender for Atlético Palma del Río.

== Career ==
Born in Córdoba, Andalusia, Cruz finished his development with local Córdoba, making his senior debut with the reserves in 2008–09. His first competitive appearance with the first team took place on 6 January 2013, in a 0–0 away draw against Mirandés in the Segunda División.

Cruz played 32 matches during the 2013–14 season, in a promotion to La Liga after a 42-year absence. On 15 July 2014, he renewed his contract with the club for three seasons, and was immediately loaned to Alcorcón also in the second division.

In late August 2015, Cruz cut ties with Córdoba and moved to fellow second-tier team Llagostera. He spent the following years in the same league, representing Mirandés, Lorca and Extremadura, aside from a six-month spell at Miedź Legnica in the Polish Ekstraklasa and an even shorter stint with Romania's Rapid București.

== Personal life ==
Cruz's younger brother, Bernardo, was also a footballer and a defender. Both were developed at Córdoba.

== Career statistics ==
As of match played 13 May 2023

Appearances and goals by club, season and competition
Club	Season	League			National cup		Other		Total	
Club	Season	Division	Apps	Goals	Apps	Goals	Apps	Goals	Apps	Goals
Córdoba	2012–13	Segunda División	1	0	0	0	—		1	0
Córdoba	2013–14	Segunda División	29	0	1	0	3 (Note: Appearances in La Liga play-offs)	0	33	0
Córdoba	2015–16	Segunda División	0	0	0	0	—		0	0
Córdoba	Total		30	0	1	0	3	0	34	0
Alcorcón (loan)	2014–15	Segunda División	12	0	1	0	—		13	0
Llagostera	2015–16	Segunda División	16	0	2	0	—		18	0
Rapid București	2015–16	Liga II	17	1	0	0	—		17	1
Mirandés	2016–17	Segunda División	37	1	0	0	—		37	1
Lorca	2017–18	Segunda División	36	2	0	0	—		36	2
Miedź Legnica	2018–19	Ekstraklasa	8	0	2	0	—		10	0
Miedź Legnica II	2018–19	III liga	3	0	—		—		3	0
Extremadura	2018–19	Segunda División	4	0	0	0	—		4	0
Extremadura	2019–20	Segunda División	26	1	0	0	—		26	1
Extremadura	2020–21	Segunda División B	18	2	0	0	—		18	2
Extremadura	2021–22	Primera Federación	11	0	1	0	—		12	0
Extremadura	Total		59	3	1	0	0	0	60	3
Cultural Leonesa	2021–22	Primera Federación	12	0	0	0	—		12	0
Cultural Leonesa	2022–23	Primera Federación	11	0	0	0	—		11	0
Cultural Leonesa	Total		23	0	0	0	0	0	23	0
Career total			241	7	7	0	3	0	251	7
