= Gorka Kijera =

Spanish footballer

Personal information
- Full name: Gorka Kijera Salaberria
- Date of birth: 26 May 1986 (age 40)
- Place of birth: Hernani, Spain
- Height: 1.76 m (5 ft 9 in)
- Position: Left-back

Youth career
- Hernani
- 2004–2005: Real Sociedad

Senior career*
Years	Team	Apps	(Gls)
2005	Real Sociedad B	0	(0)
2005–2007	Hernani		
2007–2008	Lemona	26	(0)
2008	Bilbao Athletic	4	(0)
2008–2009	Hernani		
2009–2011	Eibar	59	(1)
2011–2012	Cartagena	21	(0)
2012–2013	Real Unión	33	(2)
2013–2014	Eibar	11	(0)
2014–2020	Mirandés	210	(4)
2020–2023	Real Unión	65	(2)
Total		429	(9)
- * Club domestic league appearances and goals

Gorka Kijera Salaberria (born 26 May 1986) is a Spanish former professional footballer who played as a left-back.

== Club career ==
Born in Hernani, Gipuzkoa, Kijera graduated from Real Sociedad's youth system, but made his debut as a senior with lowly CD Hernani. In the summer of 2007, he joined SD Lemona of Segunda División B.

On 17 June 2008, Kijera moved to Athletic Bilbao and was assigned to the reserves also in the third division. In November, he terminated his contract alleging personal reasons, and returned to his hometown club.

Kijera signed a two-year deal with SD Eibar on 14 July 2009. On 20 June 2011 he joined FC Cartagena, and played his first match as a professional on 9 October, starting in a 0–0 draw against Gimnàstic de Tarragona in the Segunda División.

On 5 July 2012, after the Murcians' relegation, Kijera moved to Real Unión. He featured regularly during his only season, totalling nearly 3,000 minutes of action.

On 11 July 2013, Kijera returned to Eibar now in the second tier. He appeared sparingly in the 2013–14 campaign, as the Basque side was promoted to La Liga for the first time ever.

Kijera cut ties with the Armeros on 27 August 2014, signing with CD Mirandés a day later. On 24 July 2020, having spent the majority of his spell as team captain, the 34-year-old left after his contract expired.
