= Daniel Provencio =

Spanish footballer

Dani Provencio
Personal information
- Full name: Daniel Provencio Azcune
- Date of birth: 7 October 1987 (age 39)
- Place of birth: Madrid, Spain
- Height: 1.82 m (6 ft 0 in)
- Position: Midfielder

Team information
- Current team: Racing Madrid

Youth career
- Real Madrid
- → Santa Ana (loan)
- Moscardó

Senior career*
Years	Team	Apps	(Gls)
2006–2008	Moscardó	?	(19)
2008–2011	Rayo Vallecano B	86	(12)
2010–2011	Rayo Vallecano	10	(0)
2011–2012	Getafe B	36	(4)
2012–2013	Levante B	35	(2)
2013–2014	Hospitalet	24	(2)
2014	CFR Cluj	0	(0)
2014–2017	Mirandés	80	(1)
2017–2019	Elche	40	(0)
2019	→ Ibiza (loan)	15	(0)
2019–2020	Lleida Esportiu	4	(0)
2020–2021	Las Rozas	18	(0)
2021–2022	Moscardó	36	(4)
2022–	Racing Madrid	26	(2)
- * Club domestic league appearances and goals as of 9 November 2025

Daniel 'Dani' Provencio Azcune (born 7 October 1987) is a Spanish footballer who plays for Tercera Federación club Racing Madrid as a midfielder.

== Club career ==
Born in Madrid, Provencio played youth football for local clubs Real Madrid, DAV Santa Ana and CDC Moscardó, making his senior debut with the latter in the 2006–07 season. In 2008 he signed with Rayo Vallecano, being initially assigned to the reserves in Tercera División.

On 10 April 2010, Provencio made his first official appearance with the main squad, coming on as an injury-time substitute in a 3–2 home win against UD Las Palmas in the Segunda División. He finished his first year with only three appearances, and in the second added a further seven, again all from the bench.

In the summer of 2011, Provencio left Rayo and signed with Getafe CF, again starting playing with the B side but now in Segunda División B. A year later he joined another reserve team, Atlético Levante UD.

Provencio was released by the Valencians in June 2013. Two months later, he moved to CE L'Hospitalet of the same league.

On 12 July 2014, Provencio moved abroad for the first time in his career, joining Romanian club CFR Cluj. However, on 28 August he returned to his native country, signing for CD Mirandés.

On 12 January 2016, Provencio scored twice in a 3–0 away victory over Deportivo de La Coruña in the Copa del Rey, which meant qualification to the quarter-finals 4–1 on aggregate. In the 2017 off-season he moved to third-tier Elche CF, who loaned him to UD Ibiza on 30 January 2019.
