= Néstor Salinas =

Spanish footballer

Personal information
- Full name: Néstor Salinas Alonso
- Date of birth: 28 February 1993 (age 33)
- Place of birth: Cabanillas, Spain
- Height: 1.87 m (6 ft 2 in)
- Position: Midfielder

Youth career
- 2006–2011: Athletic Bilbao

Senior career*
Years	Team	Apps	(Gls)
2011–2014	Basconia	51	(8)
2013–2014	→ Amorebieta (loan)	29	(4)
2014–2015	Bilbao Athletic	34	(3)
2015–2017	Mirandés	56	(9)
2017–2019	Mallorca	0	(0)
2017–2018	→ Ponferradina (loan)	12	(0)
2018–2019	→ Tudelano (loan)	16	(0)
2020	Tudelano	24	(1)
2021	Ejea	13	(2)
2021–2022	Sestao River	27	(1)
2022–2023	Tarazona	35	(5)
- * Club domestic league appearances and goals as of 13 March 2021

Néstor Salinas Alonso (born 28 February 1993) is a Spanish footballer who plays as a midfielder.

== Club career ==
Born in Cabanillas, Navarre, Salinas graduated with Athletic Bilbao's youth setup, and made his debuts as a senior with the farm team in 2011, in Tercera División. On 31 August 2013 he was loaned to SD Amorebieta in Segunda División B, in a season-long deal.

On 26 May 2014 Salinas was assigned to the reserves also in the third division, after his loan expired. He appeared in 34 matches for the side during the campaign, as it returned to Segunda División after a 19-year absence.

On 29 June 2015 Salinas was released by the Lions, and signed a two-year deal with CD Mirandés on 4 July. He made his debut as a professional on 23 August, coming on as a second-half substitute for Fran Carnicer in a 1–1 home draw against Real Zaragoza.

Salinas scored his first professional goal on 10 October 2015, netting his team's third in a 4–1 away routing of Elche CF, through a penalty. He finished the campaign with seven goals in 34 appearances, being the club's top goalscorer along with Lago Junior and Álex García.
