= Bernardo Cruz =

Spanish footballer

Bernardo
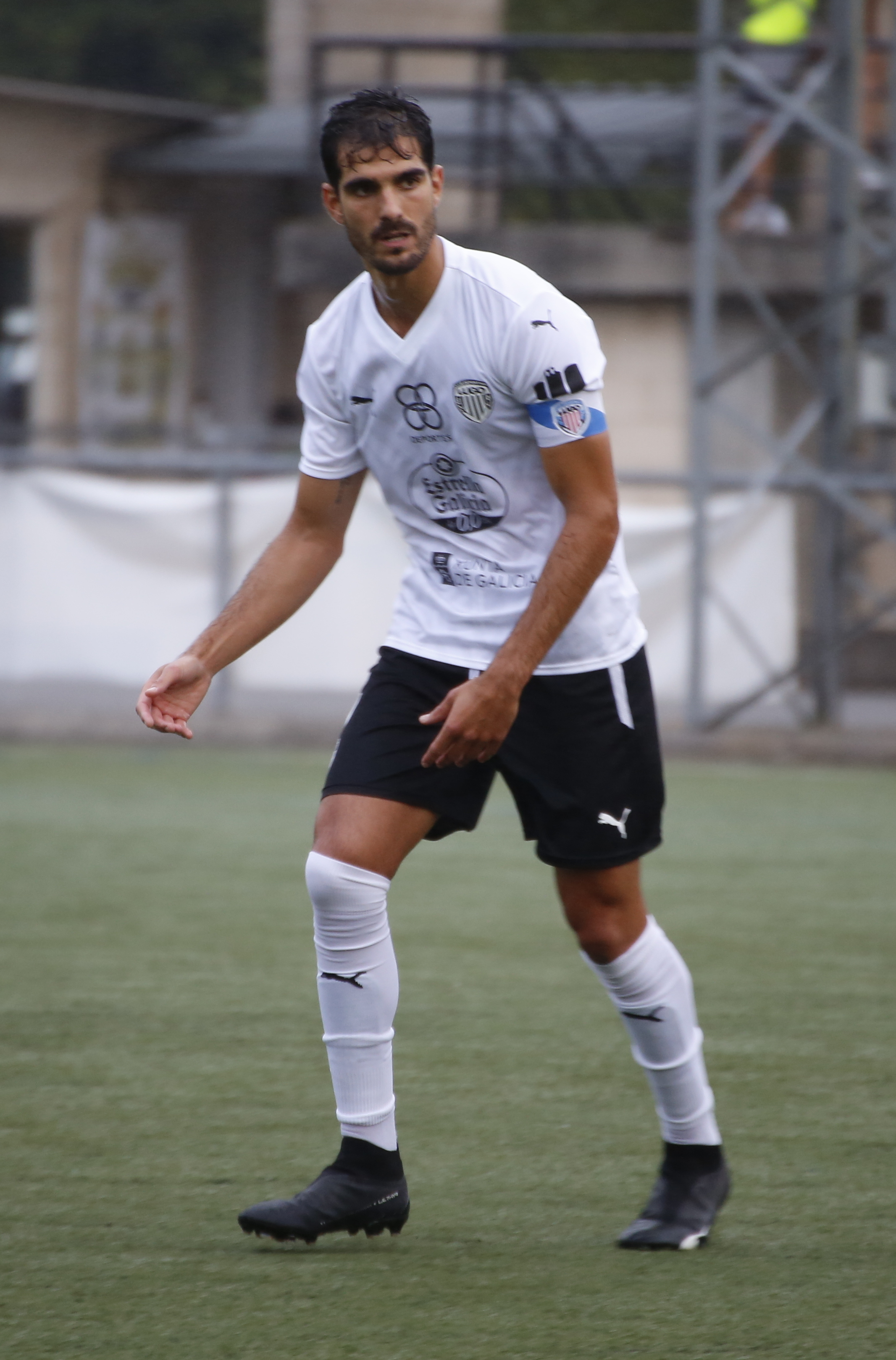
- Bernardo with Lugo in 2024

Personal information
- Full name: Bernardo Víctor Cruz Torres
- Date of birth: 17 July 1993 (age 33)
- Place of birth: Córdoba, Spain
- Height: 1.90 m (6 ft 3 in)
- Position: Centre-back

Youth career
- Córdoba

Senior career*
Years	Team	Apps	(Gls)
2010–2014	Córdoba B	89	(3)
2011–2015	Córdoba	15	(0)
2014–2015	→ Racing Santander (loan)	16	(0)
2015–2017	Sevilla B	75	(3)
2017–2019	Lugo	40	(1)
2019–2020	Granada	4	(1)
2019–2020	→ Alcorcón (loan)	4	(0)
2020	→ Numancia (loan)	8	(0)
2020–2022	Córdoba	36	(2)
2022–2023	Recreativo	23	(0)
2023–2025	Lugo	14	(1)
- * Club domestic league appearances and goals as of 1 July 2025

Bernardo Víctor Cruz Torres (born 17 July 1993), known simply as Bernardo, is a Spanish professional footballer who plays as a central defender.

== Career ==
Born in Córdoba, Andalusia, Bernardo finished his development at local club Córdoba, making his senior debut with their reserves in 2010–11. He first played an official match for the first team on 6 September 2011, when he came on as second-half substitute in a 1–0 away win against Real Murcia in the second round of the Copa del Rey. His maiden Segunda División appearance came two years later, in a 3–1 home victory over Numancia.

On 15 July 2014, after contributing 15 games in a promotion to La Liga, Bernardo joined Racing de Santander on loan. After that spell, he terminated his contract with Córdoba and signed with another reserve team, Sevilla Atlético of Segunda División B.

Bernardo was an undisputed starter during his two-year spell, winning promotion in his first season. He scored his first goal as a professional on 1 October 2016, to help his side earn one point at Gimnàstic de Tarragona (1–1).

On 30 June 2017, Bernardo agreed to a two-year contract with Lugo. In the 2019 January transfer window, however, he rejoined former Sevilla B coach Diego Martínez at Granada, who also competed in the second division.

On 2 September 2019, after appearing rarely as the team achieved promotion, Bernardo was loaned to Alcorcón for one year. The following 11 January, he moved to Numancia also of the second tier and in a temporary deal.

Bernardo returned to Córdoba in the summer of 2020, on a free transfer.

== Personal life ==
Bernardo's older brother, Francisco, was also a footballer and a defender. Both were brought up at Córdoba.
