= Íñigo Eguaras =

Spanish footballer

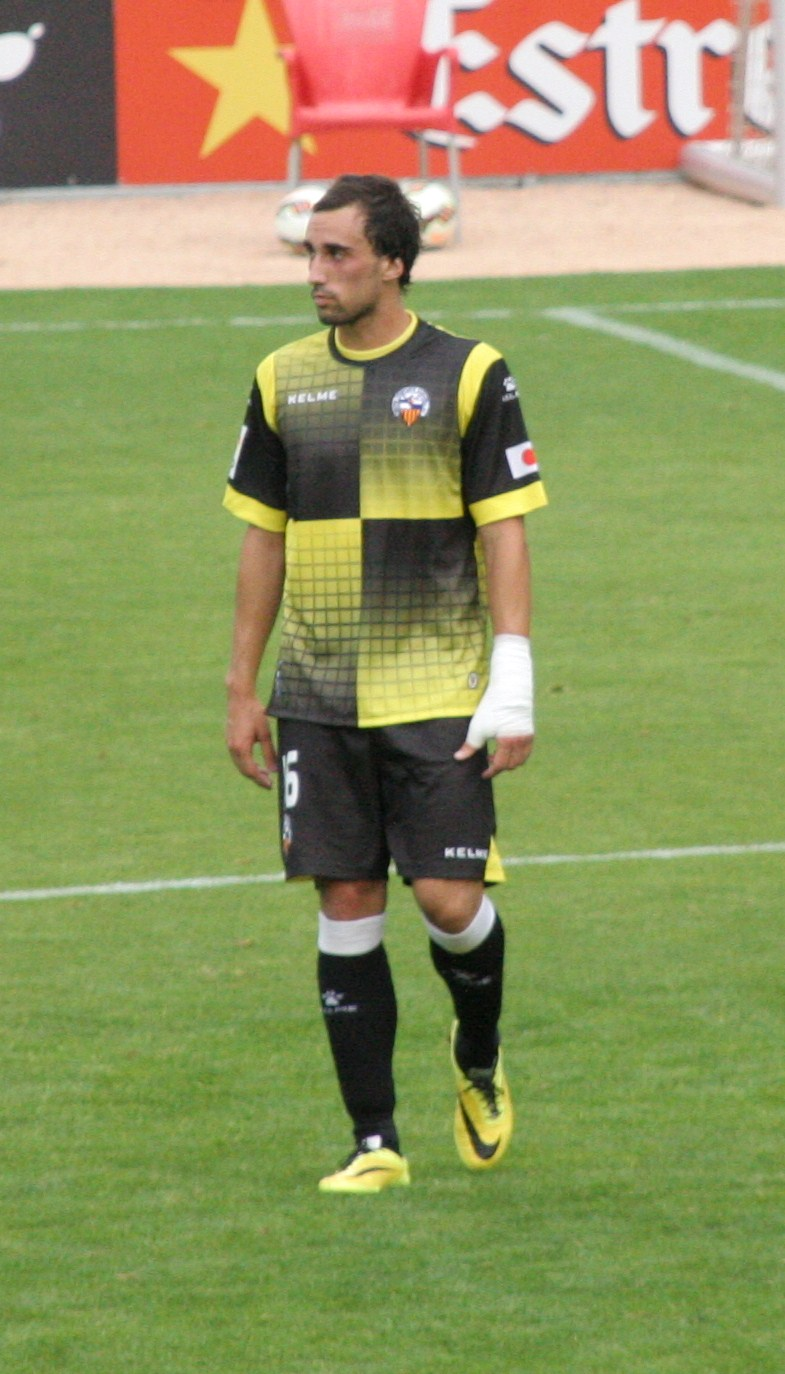

Personal information
- Full name: Íñigo Eguaras Álvarez
- Date of birth: 7 March 1992 (age 34)
- Place of birth: Ansoáin, Spain
- Height: 1.81 m (5 ft 11 in)
- Position: Midfielder

Youth career
- Txantrea
- 2004–2010: Athletic Bilbao

Senior career*
Years	Team	Apps	(Gls)
2010–2011	Basconia	31	(2)
2011–2014	Bilbao Athletic	84	(6)
2014–2015	Sabadell	34	(1)
2015–2017	Mirandés	69	(7)
2017–2022	Zaragoza	154	(4)
2022–2023	Almería	39	(2)
2024–2025	Celje	14	(1)
2025–2026	Dunkerque	10	(0)
- * Club domestic league appearances and goals as of 11 May 2026

Íñigo Eguaras Álvarez (born 7 March 1992) is a Spanish footballer who plays as a central midfielder.

== Football career ==
Born in Ansoáin, Navarre, Eguaras graduated from Athletic Bilbao's youth setup after joining in 2004 from UDC Txantrea, and made his senior debuts with CD Basconia, the club's farm team, in the 2010–11 campaign, in Tercera División. On 10 June 2011 he was promoted to the reserves in Segunda División B.

On 26 May 2014 Eguaras was released by the Lions, and subsequently signed for Segunda División club CE Sabadell FC on 2 July. He played his first match as a professional on 24 August, starting in a 2–3 home loss against Real Betis.

Eguaras scored his first professional goal on 16 May 2015, netting the last in a 1–1 away draw against CD Leganés. On 17 July he signed for fellow league team CD Mirandés, after agreeing to a two-year deal.

On 19 June 2017, after suffering relegation, Eguaras moved to fellow second tier club Real Zaragoza. A regular starter, he renewed his contract until 2024 on 18 May 2020.

On 21 January 2022, Eguaras moved to fellow second division side UD Almería on a two-and-a-half-year deal. He scored once in 14 appearances during the remainder of the season, as the club achieved promotion to La Liga.

Eguaras made his top tier debut on 14 August 2022, starting in a 2–1 home loss to Real Madrid. He scored his first goal in the category on 29 October, netting his team's third in a 3–1 home win over RC Celta de Vigo.

On 30 August 2023, Eguaras terminated his contract with the Andalusians.

On 28 September 2024, Eguaras joined Slovenian PrvaLiga club NK Celje on a contract for this season.

On 16 August 2025, Eguaras moved to Dunkerque in French Ligue 2 for one season.

== Personal life ==
Íñigo's younger brother Aritz is also a footballer. A defender, he has appeared for several clubs in the Navarre region including CD Izarra.
