= Jona (footballer) =

Spanish-born Honduran footballer (born 1989)

Personal information
- Full name: Jonathan Mejía Ruiz
- Date of birth: 7 January 1989 (age 37)
- Place of birth: Málaga, Spain
- Height: 1.83 m (6 ft 0 in)
- Position: Striker

Youth career
- Málaga

Senior career*
Years	Team	Apps	(Gls)
2008–2009	Lorca Deportiva	22	(2)
2009–2010	Melilla	9	(0)
2010–2011	Deportivo B	28	(5)
2011–2012	Zamora	36	(12)
2012–2013	Ourense	18	(11)
2013–2015	Granada	0	(0)
2013	→ Vitória Guimarães B (loan)	2	(0)
2013	→ Vitória Guimarães (loan)	3	(0)
2013–2014	→ Jaén (loan)	39	(16)
2014–2015	→ Cádiz (loan)	32	(18)
2015–2017	Albacete	29	(5)
2016–2017	→ UCAM Murcia (loan)	37	(15)
2017–2019	Córdoba	18	(3)
2018	→ Cádiz (loan)	14	(0)
2018–2019	→ Lugo (loan)	8	(0)
2019–2020	Hércules	34	(4)
2020–2022	Alcoyano	34	(7)
2022–2023	Torre del Mar	10	(1)

International career
2013–2015	Honduras	6	(0)
- * Club domestic league appearances and goals as of 08:58, 20 July 2023 (UTC)

Jonathan Mejía Ruiz (born 7 January 1989), commonly known as Jona, is a Honduran professional footballer who plays as a striker.

== Club career ==
Born in Málaga, Andalusia, Jona only played lower league football in his beginnings, always in the Segunda División B. He represented in quick succession Lorca Deportiva CF, UD Melilla, Deportivo Fabril, Zamora CF and CD Ourense.

In mid-January 2013, after excelling in the first half of the season with Ourense, Jona was acquired by La Liga club Granada CF, being immediately loaned to Vitória S.C. of Portugal. He made his Primeira Liga debut with the latter on 4 March, playing two minutes in a 2–0 home win against Académica de Coimbra.

In the following years, Jona all but competed in the Spanish Segunda División, representing Real Jaén, Cádiz CF (two spells), Albacete Balompié, UCAM Murcia CF, Córdoba CF and CD Lugo. He was relegated from that level three times.

Jona terminated his contract with Córdoba on 15 January 2019, and signed a two-and-a-half-year deal with third division side Hércules CF the following day.

== International career ==
Jona's father, Leonidas Mejía, was a Honduran from Tegucigalpa, and his mother was Spanish. In April 2013, he expressed interest in representing the Honduras national team.

Jona made his debut on 2 June 2013, in a friendly with Israel. He represented the nation at the 2014 Copa Centroamericana.

== Personal life ==
Jona's older half brother, Antonio Moreno, was also a footballer and a forward. He played once with Sevilla FC's first team, and also represented Cádiz.
