= Carlos Moreno (footballer, born 1992) =

Spanish footballer

Personal information
- Full name: Carlos Moreno Gómez
- Date of birth: 14 February 1992 (age 34)
- Place of birth: Villarrobledo, Spain
- Height: 1.80 m (5 ft 11 in)
- Position: Right back

Team information
- Current team: Peña Deportiva

Youth career
- Albacete

Senior career*
Years	Team	Apps	(Gls)
2011–2012	Albacete B	24	(5)
2012–2015	Albacete	55	(1)
2015–2017	Mirandés	63	(1)
2017–2019	UCAM Murcia	47	(1)
2020	Mérida	2	(0)
2020–2021	Las Rozas	22	(0)
2021–2022	Ibiza Islas Pitiusas	15	(0)
2022–2023	Alzira	5	(0)
2023–2024	Toledo	40	(1)
2024–2025	Penya Independent	30	(2)
2025–	Peña Deportiva	9	(0)
- * Club domestic league appearances and goals as of 1 November 2025

Carlos Moreno Gómez (born 14 February 1992) is a Spanish footballer who plays for Tercera Federación club Peña Deportiva mainly as a right back.

== Club career ==
Born in Villarrobledo, Albacete, Castilla-La Mancha, Moreno was a youth product at Albacete Balompié, making his senior debuts with the reserves in the 2010–11 campaign, in Tercera División. In October 2012 he was promoted to the main squad in Segunda División B.

On 10 September 2014, Moreno played his first match as a professional, starting in a 1–0 home win over Real Zaragoza for the season's Copa del Rey. His Segunda División debut came on 11 October by playing the full 90 minutes in a 0–1 home loss against Girona FC.

On 11 July 2015 Moreno signed a two-year deal with fellow league team CD Mirandés.
