= Álex García (footballer, born 1984) =

Spanish footballer

Personal information
- Full name: Alejandro García Peña
- Date of birth: 24 September 1984 (age 42)
- Place of birth: Bilbao, Spain
- Height: 1.85 m (6 ft 1 in)
- Position: Winger

Team information
- Current team: Cacereño (assistant coach)

Youth career
- SD Gama
- Racing Santander

Senior career*
Years	Team	Apps	(Gls)
2003–2006	Racing B	53	(14)
2003–2004	→ Rayo Cantabria (loan)		
2006	Racing Santander	1	(0)
2006–2007	Bilbao Athletic	29	(3)
2007–2008	Villarreal B	12	(0)
2008–2010	Jaén	68	(9)
2010–2011	Eibar	23	(3)
2011–2012	Badalona	37	(4)
2012–2013	Guadalajara	19	(2)
2013–2014	Sestao	40	(10)
2014–2016	Mirandés	80	(9)
2016–2017	Tenerife	7	(0)
2017	→ Mirandés (loan)	17	(1)
2017–2018	Racing Santander	16	(0)
2018–2020	Cacereño	47	(14)

Managerial career
- 2020–: Cacereño (assistant)
- * Club domestic league appearances and goals

Alejandro "Álex" García Peña (born 24 September 1984) is a Spanish professional football coach and a former left winger. He is an assistant coach with Cacereño.

== Club career ==
Born in Bilbao, Biscay, García began his career with Racing de Santander, making his senior debuts in 2004–05 for the reserves after a loan spell at neighbouring Deportivo Rayo Cantabria. On 22 January 2006 he made his first-team – and La Liga – debut, appearing as a substitute in a 2–3 home loss against Sevilla FC and being released at the end of the season.

In summer 2006, García returned to his native Basque Country as he signed with Athletic Bilbao, but he only featured with the B-team in Segunda División B during his one-season spell. He went on to remain in that level in the following years with Villarreal CF B, Real Jaén, SD Eibar and CF Badalona.

On 2 July 2012, García signed with Segunda División club CD Guadalajara. On 8 December he made his first league appearance with his new team, against CD Numancia; he scored his first goal in the second tier on 7 April of the following year, contributing to a 3–1 home win over Córdoba CF.
