= Marc Caballé =

Spanish footballer (born 1991)

Personal information
- Full name: Marc Caballé Naranjo
- Date of birth: 22 June 1991 (age 35)
- Place of birth: L'Hospitalet de Llobregat, Spain
- Height: 1.85 m (6 ft 1 in)
- Position: Defensive midfielder

Team information
- Current team: Inter Club d'Escaldes
- Number: 6

Youth career
- Espanyol

Senior career*
Years	Team	Apps	(Gls)
2010	Espanyol B	1	(0)
2010–2012	Atlético Madrid C	54	(3)
2012–2013	Málaga B	14	(0)
2013–2015	Espanyol B	35	(2)
2015–2016	Espanyol	0	(0)
2015–2016	→ Lugo (loan)	2	(0)
2016	→ Cornellà (loan)	13	(1)
2016–2018	Cornellà	66	(5)
2018–2019	Recreativo	17	(0)
2019–2020	Rayo Majadahonda	17	(1)
2020–2022	Atlético Sanluqueño	32	(3)
2022	Linares	10	(0)
2022–2023	Zamora	14	(1)
2023–	Inter Club d'Escaldes	37	(9)
- * Club domestic league appearances and goals as of 27 May 2024

Marc Caballé Naranjo (born 22 June 1991) is a Spanish footballer who plays for Inter Club d'Escaldes as a defensive midfielder.

== Club career ==
Born in L'Hospitalet de Llobregat, Barcelona, Catalonia, Caballé graduated with RCD Espanyol's youth setup, and made his debut as a senior with the reserves in the 2009–10 campaign, in Segunda División B. In the 2010 summer, he signed for Atlético Madrid and was assigned to the C-team in Tercera División.

On 14 July 2012, Caballé joined another reserve team, Atlético Malagueño, also in the fourth division. On 12 July of the following year, after appearing sparingly, he returned to Espanyol and its B-team.

In July 2014, Caballé suffered a serious knee injury and was sidelined for seven months, but still renewed his link until 2018. He was promoted to the main squad in La Liga on 3 June of the following year.

On 31 August 2015, Caballé was loaned to CD Lugo in a season-long deal. He made his professional debut on 15 October, starting in a 0–1 Copa del Rey away loss against SD Ponferradina.

On 29 January 2016, after being rarely used, Caballé was loaned to UE Cornellà until June. On 16 June, he rescinded his contract with the Pericos.
