= Roberto Gutiérrez (footballer, born 1991) =

Spanish footballer

Roberto
Personal information
- Full name: Roberto Gutiérrez Díaz
- Date of birth: 15 March 1991 (age 35)
- Place of birth: Santa Cruz de Tenerife, Spain
- Height: 1.83 m (6 ft 0 in)
- Position: Goalkeeper

Youth career
- Tenerife

Senior career*
Years	Team	Apps	(Gls)
2010–2012	Tenerife B	41	(0)
2012–2016	Tenerife	45	(0)
2016–2017	Mirandés	20	(0)
2017–2019	Sabadell	74	(0)
2020–2021	Calahorra	31	(0)
2021–2022	San Fernando	14	(0)
2022	Toledo	14	(0)
2022–2023	Guijuelo	6	(0)
2023–2024	Atlético Paso	1	(0)
2024–2025	Anguiano	31	(0)
2025–2026	Atlético Paso	31	(0)
- * Club domestic league appearances and goals as of 23:22, 18 August 2026 (UTC)

Roberto Gutiérrez Díaz (born 15 March 1991), known simply as Roberto, is a Spanish footballer who plays as a goalkeeper.

== Club career ==
Born in Santa Cruz de Tenerife, Canary Islands, Roberto spent his youth career with local club CD Tenerife, making his senior debut with their reserves in 2010–11 season, in the Tercera División. He was promoted to the first team in the summer of 2012, appearing twice during the campaign as they achieved promotion from Segunda División B.

Roberto played his first game as a professional on 19 October 2013, starting in a 1–0 Segunda División away win over SD Ponferradina. He subsequently became first choice for the Álvaro Cervera-led side, replacing longtime incumbent Sergio Aragoneses.

On 29 July 2016, Roberto signed with fellow second-division CD Mirandés as a free agent. He returned to the third tier after 21 competitive matches, representing CE Sabadell FC and CD Calahorra.

Roberto then moved to the Segunda Federación, where he appeared for UD San Fernando, CD Toledo and CD Guijuelo.
