= 2014–15 Elche CF season =

Elche CF
2014–15 season
- Chairman: José Sepulcre
- Manager: Fran Escribá
- Stadium: Martínez Valero
- La Liga: 13th (relegated, administratively by the LFP)
- Copa del Rey: Round of 16
- Top goalscorer: League: Jonathas (14); All: Jonathas (14)
Home colours	Away colours	Third colours

The 2014–15 season was the 92nd season in Elche’s history and the 21st in the top-tier.

== Squad ==
As of 30 January 2014

Note: Flags indicate national team as defined under FIFA eligibility rules; some limited exceptions apply. Players may hold more than one non-FIFA nationality.

No.	Pos.	Nation	Player
1	GK	ESP	Manu Herrera
2	DF	URU	Damián Suárez
3	DF	CHI	Enzo Roco (on loan from Universidad Católica)
4	DF	ESP	David Lombán
5	DF	ESP	Domingo Cisma
6	MF	ESP	Pedro Mosquera
7	MF	ESP	Aarón Ñíguez
8	MF	ESP	Adrián González
9	FW	ESP	Cristian Herrera
10	FW	ESP	Coro

No.	Pos.	Nation	Player
11	MF	CPV	Garry Rodrigues
14	DF	ESP	José Ángel Alonso
17	MF	ESP	Víctor Rodríguez
18	DF	ESP	Sergio Pelegrín
19	FW	ESP	Álvaro Giménez
20	MF	MAR	Fayçal Fajr
21	DF	ESP	Edu Albácar (Captain)
22	FW	BRA	Jonathas
24	MF	CRO	Mario Pašalić (on loan from Chelsea)
25	GK	POL	Przemysław Tytoń (on loan from PSV)

=== Out on loan ===
Note: Flags indicate national team as defined under FIFA eligibility rules; some limited exceptions apply. Players may hold more than one non-FIFA nationality.

No.	Pos.	Nation	Player
—	DF	ENG	Charlie I'Anson (on loan at Oviedo)
—	MF	ESP	Fidel Chaves (on loan at Córdoba)
—	MF	ESP	Miguel Ángel Garrido (on loan at Girona)

No.	Pos.	Nation	Player
—	MF	CHI	Nicolás Maturana (on loan at Alcoyano)
—	MF	ESP	Pelayo (on loan at Lugo)
—	FW	ESP	Jesús Tamayo (on loan at Alcorcón B)

== Transfers ==
=== Summer ===
In: Note: Flags indicate national team as defined under FIFA eligibility rules; some limited exceptions apply. Players may hold more than one non-FIFA nationality.

No.	Pos.	Nation	Player
3	DF	CHI	Enzo Roco (on loan from (Chile) Universidad Católica)
6	MF	ESP	Pedro Mosquera (from (Spain) Getafe)
8	MF	ESP	Adrián González (from (Spain) Rayo Vallecano)
17	MF	ESP	Víctor Rodríguez (from (Spain) Zaragoza)
20	MF	MAR	Fayçal Fajr (from (France) Caen)
22	FW	BRA	Jonathas (on loan from (Italy) Latina)
24	MF	CRO	Mario Pašalić (on loan from (England) Chelsea)
25	GK	POL	Przemysław Tytoń (on loan from (Netherlands) PSV Eindhoven)
34	FW	ARG	Franco Fragapane (loan from (Argentina) Boca Juniors)
—	MF	BEL	Gaby Mudingayi (from (Italy) Inter Milan)

Out: Note: Flags indicate national team as defined under FIFA eligibility rules; some limited exceptions apply. Players may hold more than one non-FIFA nationality.

No.	Pos.	Nation	Player
—	DF	ESP	Alberto Botía (loan return to (Spain) Sevilla, later signed by Olympiacos)
—	FW	ESP	Manu del Moral (loan return to (Spain) Sevilla, later loaned to Eibar)
—	MF	ESP	Fidel (on loan to (Spain) Córdoba)
—	MF	ESP	Javi Flores
—	MF	ESP	Sergio Mantecón (to (Spain) Cádiz)
—	MF	ESP	Javi Márquez (loan return to (Spain) Mallorca, later signed by Granada)
—	MF	ESP	Rubén Pérez (loan return to (Spain) Atlético Madrid, later loaned to Torino)
—	MF	ESP	Alberto Rivera (retired)
24	MF	COL	Carlos Sánchez (to (England) Aston Villa)
—	GK	ESP	Toño (to (Spain) Zaragoza)

=== Winter ===
In: Note: Flags indicate national team as defined under FIFA eligibility rules; some limited exceptions apply. Players may hold more than one non-FIFA nationality.

No.	Pos.	Nation	Player

Out: Note: Flags indicate national team as defined under FIFA eligibility rules; some limited exceptions apply. Players may hold more than one non-FIFA nationality.

No.	Pos.	Nation	Player
—	DF	ENG	Charlie (to (Spain) Real Oviedo, previously on loan to (Spain) Alcorcón)
—	MF	BEL	Gaby Mudingayi (to (Italy) Cesena)

== Competitions ==
=== La Liga ===
==== League table ====
Pos	Team	Pld	W	D	L	GF	GA	GD	Pts	Qualification or relegation
11	Rayo Vallecano	38	15	4	19	46	68	−22	49 (Note: Espanyol ahead on head-to-head record; Rayo Vallecano–Espanyol 1–3, Espanyol–Rayo Vallecano 1–1.)	
12	Real Sociedad	38	11	13	14	44	51	−7	46	
13	Elche (Note: Elche administratively relegated by the LFP.) (R)	38	11	8	19	35	62	−27	41	Relegation to Segunda División
14	Levante	38	9	10	19	34	67	−33	37 (Note: Levante ahead on head-to-head record; Levante–Getafe 1–1, Getafe–Levante 0–1.)	
15	Getafe	38	10	7	21	33	64	−31	37	

Source: La Liga
Rules for classification: 1) points; 2) head-to-head points; 3) head-to-head goal difference; 4) goal difference; 5) number of goals scored; 6) fair-play points; 7) playoff match
(R) Relegated

==== Results by round ====
Round	1	2	3	4	5	6	7	8	9	10	11	12	13	14	15	16	17	18	19	20	21	22	23	24	25	26	27	28	29	30	31	32	33	34	35	36	37	38
Ground																																						
Result																																						
Position	20	19	10	13	16	18	16	18	19	17	18	19	19	20	20	20	20	19	16	17	19	17	17	17	17	15	15	15	15	16	15	14	14	13	13	13	13	13

A = Away; H = Home; W = Win; D = Draw; L = Loss

==== Results ====
24 August 2014 1	Barcelona	3–0	Elche	Barcelona
21:00 CEST (UTC+02:00)	Messi 42', 63'; Mascherano (red card) 44'; Munir 46'	Report	Pašalić (yellow card) 55'	Stadium: Camp Nou; Attendance: 68,105; Referee: Teixeira Vitienes

31 August 2014 2	Elche	1–1	Granada	Elche
22:00 CEST (UTC+02:00)	Suárez (yellow card) 48'; Rodrigues (yellow card) 57'; Albácar (yellow card) 86'; Mosquera (yellow card) 89'; Lombán 90+1'	Report	Iturra (yellow card) 34'; Rico (yellow card) 54', (goal) 81'; Rochina (yellow card) 55'; Yuste (yellow card) 87'	Stadium: Manuel Martínez Valero; Attendance: 20,025; Referee: Ignacio Iglesias Villanueva

14 September 2014 3	Rayo Vallecano	2–3	Elche	Madrid
12:00 CEST (UTC+02:00)	Ba (yellow card) 7'; Kakuta 45'; Castro (yellow card) 53'; Bueno 90+1' (pen.)	Report	Albácar 37'; Lombán (yellow card) 50'; Jonathas 55'; Mosquera 69'; Giménez (yellow card) 71'	Stadium: Campo de Fútbol de Vallecas; Attendance: 9,521; Referee: Iñaki Bikandi

19 September 2014 4	Elche	0–2	Eibar	Elche
21:00 CEST (UTC+02:00)	Lombán (yellow card) 71'	Report	García 3'; Iruetagoiena (yellow card) 31'; Albentosa 42'	Stadium: Martínez Valero; Attendance: 22,474; Referee: Santiago Jaime

23 September 2014 5	Real Madrid	0–2	Elche	Madrid
20:00 CEST (UTC+02:00)	Carvajal (yellow card) 4'; Marcelo (yellow card) 16'; Bale 20'; Ronaldo 28' (pen.), 32', 80' (pen.), 90+2'	Report	Albácar 15' (pen.), (yellow card) 58'	Stadium: Estadio Santiago Bernabéu; Attendance: 63,634; Referee: Carlos Clos Gómez

26 September 2014 6	Elche	0–1	Celta de Vigo	Elche
21:00 CEST (UTC+02:00)	Jonathas (yellow card) 18'; Rodrigues (yellow card) 59'; Lombán (yellow card) 61'; Adrián (yellow card) 87'	Report	Radoja (yellow card) 52' Gómez (yellow card) 64' Nolito 90'	Stadium: Estadio Manuel Martínez Valero; Attendance: 20,852; Referee: Pedro Jesús Pérez Montero

4 October 2014 7	Almería	2 – 2	Elche	Almería
22:00 CEST (UTC+02:00)	Verza 36' (pen.); Navarro (yellow card) 46'; Hemed 84'; Édgar (yellow card) 90'	Report	V.Rodríguez 7', (yellow card) 67'; José Ángel (yellow card) 21'; Albácar (yellow card) 35'; Jonathas (yellow card) 42' (yellow-red card) 67', (goal) 56'; Mosquera (yellow card) 44'	Stadium: Juegos Mediterráneos; Referee: Del Cerro Grande

19 October 2014 8	Elche	0–2	Sevilla	Elche
19:00 CEST (UTC+02:00)	Alonso (yellow card) 39'; Giménez (yellow card) 55'; Suárez (yellow card) 60'; Mosquera (yellow card) 66'; Rodrigues (yellow card) 77'	Report	Coke (yellow card) 21'; Mbia (yellow card) 30'; Bacca 59'; Gameiro 73'	Stadium: Estadio Manuel Martínez Valero; Attendance: 26,059; Referee: Eduardo Prieto

=== Copa del Rey ===
2 December 2014 Round of 32 First Leg	Real Valladolid	0 – 0	Elche	Valladolid
22:00 CET (UTC+1)	Omar (yellow card) 71'	Report	Suárez (yellow card) 68'	Stadium: Estadio José Zorrilla; Attendance: 4,687; Referee: Pedro Pérez

18 December 2016 Round of 32 Second Leg	Elche	1 – 0 (1 – 0 agg.)	Real Valladolid	Elche
20:00 CET (UTC+1)	Adrián 7'; Cristian (yellow card) 36'; Pelegrín (yellow card) 59'; Roco (yellow card) 59'; Suárez (yellow card) 87'; Tytoń (yellow card) 89'	Report	Sastre (yellow card) 36'; Timor (yellow card) 82'; Omar (yellow card) 88'; Carmona (yellow card) 89'	Stadium: Estadio Martínez Valero; Attendance: 9,022; Referee: Javier Estrada

8 January 2015 Round of 16 First Leg	Barcelona	5 – 0	Elche	Barcelona
22:00 CET (UTC+01:00)	Neymar 35', 60'; Suárez 40'; Messi 46' (pen.); Alba 56'	Report	Suárez (yellow card) 42'; Roco (yellow card) 45'; Coro (yellow card) 58'; Pelegrín (yellow card) 77'	Stadium: Camp Nou; Attendance: 27,099; Referee: David Fernández Borbalán

15 January 2015 Round of 16 Second Leg	Elche	0 – 4 (0 – 9 agg.)	Barcelona	Elche
22:00 CET (UTC+01:00)	Albácar (yellow card) 18'; Peral (yellow card) 29'	Report	Mathieu 21'; Roberto 40'; Pedro 43' (pen.); Adriano (yellow card) 63', (goal) 90+2'	Stadium: Estadio Martínez Valero; Attendance: 13,446; Referee: Santiago Jaime Latre

== Statistics ==
=== Appearances and goals ===
Updated as of 30 May 2015.

No.	Pos	Nat	Player	Total		La Liga		Copa del Rey	
No.	Pos	Nat	Player	Apps	Goals	Apps	Goals	Apps	Goals
1	GK	(Spain) ESP	Manu Herrera	8	0	6+1	0	1	0
2	DF	(Uruguay) URU	Damián Suárez	37	1	34	1	3	0
3	DF	(Chile) CHI	Enzo Roco	36	1	32	1	3+1	0
4	DF	(Spain) ESP	David Lombán	36	5	33+1	5	2	0
5	DF	(Spain) ESP	Domingo Cisma	26	0	24+1	0	1	0
6	DF	(Spain) ESP	Pedro Mosquera	27	1	24+1	1	2	0
7	MF	(Spain) ESP	Aarón Ñíguez	23	0	15+6	0	1+1	0
8	MF	(Spain) ESP	Adrián González	31	1	22+6	0	1+2	1
9	FW	(Spain) ESP	Cristian Herrera	30	1	7+19	1	4	0
10	FW	(Spain) ESP	Coro	38	0	14+20	0	4	0
11	MF	(Cape Verde) CPV	Garry Rodrigues	32	2	16+15	2	1	0
14	DF	(Spain) ESP	José Ángel	14	0	8+5	0	1	0
17	MF	(Spain) ESP	Víctor Rodríguez	38	4	33+3	4	0+2	0
18	DF	(Spain) ESP	Sergio Pelegrín	13	0	8+2	0	3	0
19	FW	(Spain) ESP	Álvaro Giménez	19	0	2+15	0	1+1	0
20	MF	(Morocco) MAR	Fayçal Fajr	38	1	29+5	1	2+2	0
21	DF	(Spain) ESP	Edu Albácar	22	2	16+2	2	4	0
22	FW	(Brazil) BRA	Jonathas	36	14	34	14	1+1	0
24	MF	(Croatia) CRO	Mario Pašalić	35	3	26+5	3	3+1	0
25	GK	(Poland) POL	Przemysław Tytoń	35	0	32	0	3	0
34	FW	(Argentina) ARG	Franco Fragapane	3	0	0+1	0	1+1	0
35	MF	(Spain) ESP	Rafa Gálvez	5	0	1+3	0	1	0
36	DF	(Spain) ESP	José Antonio Peral	1	0	0	0	1	0

=== Disciplinary record ===
Number	Nation	Position	Name	La Liga		Copa del Rey		Total	
Number	Nation	Position	Name	Yellow card	Red card	Yellow card	Red card	Yellow card	Red card
2	(Uruguay)	DF	Damián Suárez	0	0	3	0	3	0
3	(Chile)	DF	Enzo Roco	0	0	2	0	2	0
9	(Spain)	FW	Cristian	0	0	1	0	1	0
10	(Spain)	FW	Coro	0	0	1	0	1	0
18	(Spain)	DF	Sergio Pelegrín	0	0	2	0	2	0
21	(Spain)	DF	Edu Albácar	0	0	1	0	1	0
25	(Poland)	GK	Przemysław Tytoń	0	0	1	0	1	0
36	(Spain)	DF	José Antonio Peral	0	0	1	0	1	0
			Totals	0	0	12	0	12	0
