= 2014–15 FC Barcelona season =

116th season of Spanish football club

Barcelona
2014–15 season
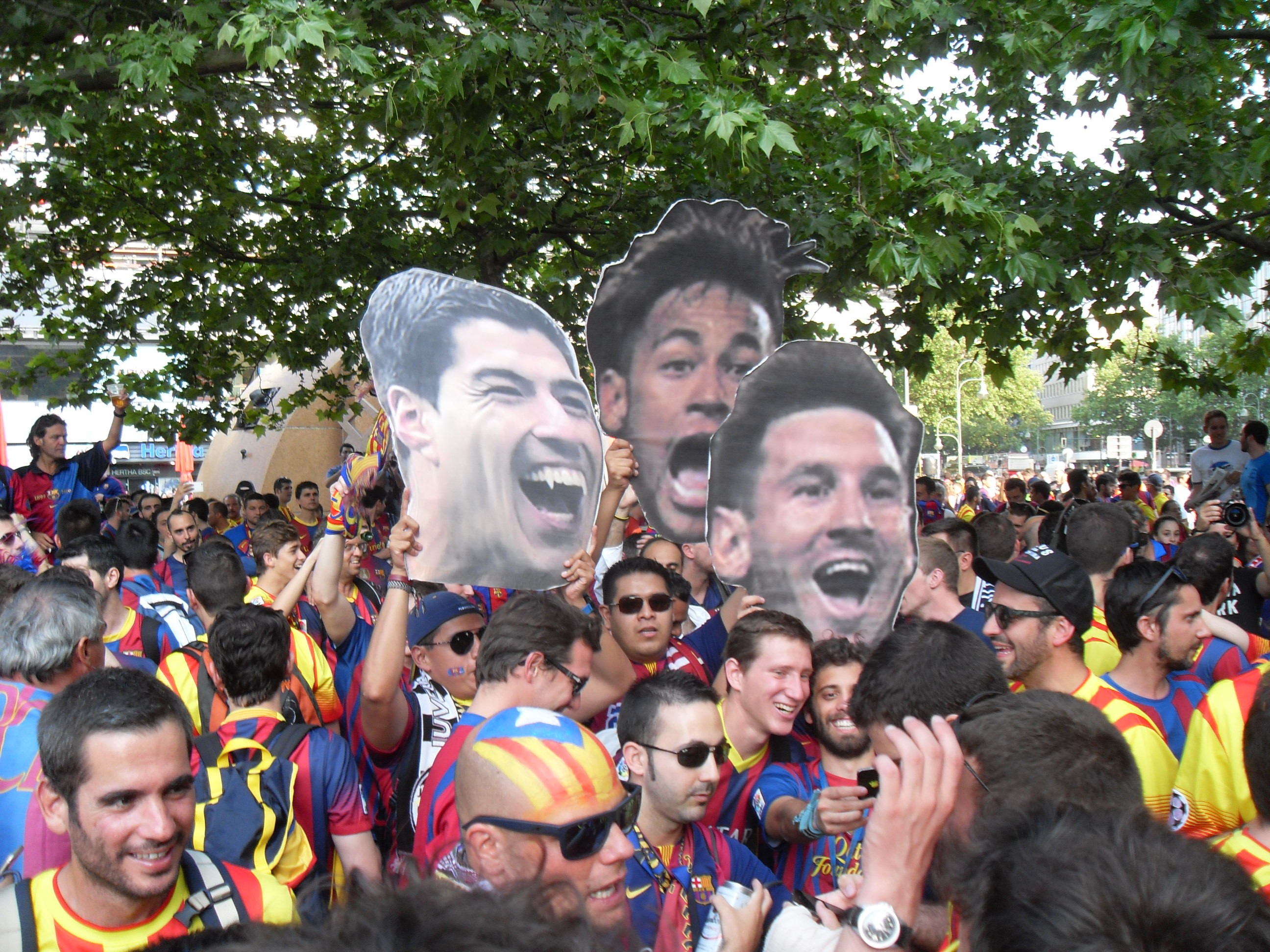
- FC Barcelona fans holding signs of (left to right): Luis Suárez, Neymar and Lionel Messi
- President: Josep Maria Bartomeu
- Head coach: Luis Enrique
- Stadium: Camp Nou
- La Liga: 1st
- Copa del Rey: Winners
- UEFA Champions League: Winners
- Top goalscorer: League: Lionel Messi (43); All: Lionel Messi (58)
- Highest home attendance: 98,760 vs Real Madrid (22 March 2015)
- Lowest home attendance: 27,099 vs Elche (8 January 2015)
- Average home league attendance: 77,374 (including Joan Gamper Trophy)
- Biggest win: Barcelona 8–0 Córdoba
- Biggest defeat: Barcelona 1–3 Real Madrid
Home colours	Away colours	Third colours

The 2014–15 season was Futbol Club Barcelona's 116th in existence and the club's 84th consecutive season in the top flight of Spanish football. This was the first of the three seasons under head coach Luis Enrique.

The season was one of the most successful ones in the club's history, as Barcelona clinched its second continental treble after winning La Liga, the Copa del Rey and the UEFA Champions League. The league title was won in a closely fought title race with Real Madrid, while the Copa victory was achieved with a brilliant 3–1 victory over Athletic Bilbao at Camp Nou in the final. In the Champions League, Barcelona overcame Bayern Munich (3–0 home, 2–3 away) to set up the final against Juventus in Berlin, where Barça triumphed 3–1. Barcelona's success may be in large part attributed to their formidable attacking trio composed of Lionel Messi, Neymar, and summer signing Luis Suárez, dubbed MSN, who scored a record 122 goals in all competitions to become the trio with most goals in a single season in Spanish football history.

The season was the first since 1998–99 without former captain Carles Puyol, who retired at the end of last season, 2001–02, and 2006–07 without goalkeepers Víctor Valdés and José Manuel Pinto. Valdés joined Manchester United in January 2015; whereas Pinto announced his retirement.

== Season overview ==
=== May ===
At the end of the 2013–14 FC Barcelona season, goalkeepers José Manuel Pinto and Víctor Valdés expired contracts were not renewed. Barcelona quickly signed Marc-André ter Stegen from Bundesliga club Borussia Mönchengladbach, and Claudio Bravo from fellow La Liga outfit Real Sociedad. On 15 May, long-time captain Carles Puyol announced his retirement from football after a 15-year career on the first team. Puyol was subsequently named Assistant to Sports Management under Director of football Andoni Zubizarreta. On 19 May, Luis Enrique was named the new manager after it was announced that Gerardo Martino would step down at the end of the season. Luis Enrique returned to Barça after being the B Team manager from 2008 to 2011.

=== June ===
On 12 June, Barcelona and Premier League club Chelsea reached an agreement for the transfer of midfielder Cesc Fàbregas for a reported fee of €33 million. With the move, Fàbregas returned to London where he started his first team career as an Arsenal player. On 16 June, Barcelona signed Croatian midfielder Ivan Rakitić from Sevilla for €18 million along with the loan of Barcelona B midfielder Denis Suárez for the next two seasons. Rakitić joins after leading Sevilla to the 2013–14 UEFA Europa League title, where he was named man of the match in the final.

=== July ===
On 9 July, Barcelona announced the transfer of Jonathan dos Santos to Villarreal for a fee of €2 million. Most of his last season with the club was spent recovering from an ACL tear which he suffered in training on 23 October 2013. With the move, Jonathan reunited with his older brother Giovani dos Santos, since both players shared time on the Barcelona youth team. On 10 July, Barcelona announced it had rescinded the contract of forward Isaac Cuenca. Cuenca then made the move to Deportivo de La Coruña, where he signed for one season to join the Galician club. Later in the day, Barcelona completed the transfer of Alexis Sánchez to Arsenal for €42 million. Sánchez left after three years when he had played 141 matches and scored 47 goals, including a season personal best of 21 goals during the 2013–14 season.

On 11 July, Barcelona and English club Liverpool announced the transfer of Uruguayan international forward Luis Suárez for a reported fee of £75 million. The reigning European Golden Shoe winner joined after spending four seasons with the Merseyside club in which he scored 82 goals in 133 appearances. Barcelona were without Suárez's services after the FIFA Disciplinary Committee banned the player for four months of any football-related activity after he was found guilty of biting Italian defender Giorgio Chiellini during Uruguay's final World Cup group stage match. The suspension meant Suárez was unable to play for Barcelona until 26 October. Later in the day, goalkeeper Oier moved to Granada on a free transfer to the Andalusian club. The transfer, however, included the caveat that "Barcelona reserves the economic rights to any future transfer of the player".

On 16 July, Barcelona announced that Spanish winger Cristian Tello would be moving on a two-year loan deal to Portuguese club Porto for a loan fee of €2 million. The deal included a purchase option for Porto of €8 million. Barcelona also informed that left back Adriano would be out four-to-six weeks with an abnormal heart rhythm discovered during his return medical. On 19 July, Barcelona played their first friendly of the pre-season against Recreativo de Huelva at the Nuevo Colombino in Huelva. The match ended 0–1 with the only goal coming from Barcelona B winger Joan Àngel Román in the 66th minute that gave Barça the Trofeo Colombino for the first time.

On 22 July, Barcelona parted ways with La Masia graduate and youth system all-time leading scorer Bojan. Bojan moved to English club Stoke City where he joined fellow La Masia graduate Marc Muniesa and ex-Barça striker and current manager Mark Hughes. On 23 July, Barcelona announced the transfer of French international central defender Jérémy Mathieu from Valencia for a transfer fee of €20 million. Mathieu signed a contract for four seasons, with an optional season, and a buyout fee of €50 million. With the move, Mathieu became the most expensive defender over 30 years old to be transferred.

=== August ===
On 9 August, Barcelona announced the signing of Belgium international defender Thomas Vermaelen from Arsenal for a fee of €19 million. The next day, Barcelona also announced that Ibrahim Afellay would be headed to Olympiacos in the Super League Greece for a season-long loan. On 14 August, the Court of Arbitration for Sport (CAS) confirmed the ban imposed by FIFA against Suárez, who remains suspended from football for four months, as well as a nine international match ban. However, the CAS removed the player's "football-related activities" ban, and was allowed to train with Barcelona. Barcelona also announced it had reached an agreement with Sevilla for the loan of forward Gerard Deulofeu for the 2014–15 season.

On 19 August, the FIFA Appeal Committee upheld its transfer ban on Barcelona in regards to "breaches relating to the international transfer and registration of players under the age of 18." Barcelona will be unable to transfer players during both the 2015 winter and summer transfer windows. Barcelona released a statement stating "that it shall continue defending its interests before the highest sporting authority, in this case the CAS". On 24 August, Barcelona started the season campaign with a 3-0 victory over Elche at the Camp Nou. A brace by Lionel Messi and a third by youth player Munir sealed the win for the Blaugrana. On 27 August, Barcelona announced it had reached an agreement with Brazilian club São Paulo for the transfer of right-back Douglas.

On 30 August, Barcelona and West Ham United announced the loan for Cameroonian international Alex Song for the remainder of the season to the Premier League club. The next day, Barcelona won their first away match at El Madrigal 0–1 versus Villarreal with the lone goal scored by Barça B forward Sandro.

=== September ===
The Senyera 2013–14 away kit

On 13 September, Barcelona played their first match after the FIFA international break and for the first time in their history, wore their Senyera shirts from the previous season in a home game. The Senyera was used to commemorate the 300th anniversary of the Siege of Barcelona in 1714. The match finished 2–0 victory against Athletic Bilbao with two second half goals from Neymar. On 17 September, Barcelona played their first match in the 2014–15 UEFA Champions League edition against Cypriot champions APOEL. It was the official debut of youngster Sergi Samper for the first team and the 300th match for Dani Alves at Barcelona. Barça won the match 1–0 with Lionel Messi heading the winning goal in 28th minute. Piqué was named Man of the Match.

On 21 September, Barcelona played against Levante. Goals from Neymar, Ivan Rakitić, Sandro, Pedro and Messi ensured that Barcelona had maintained their perfect record. On 24 September, Barcelona took on Málaga at La Rosaleda. It was the debut match for Douglas. Barcelona dropped first point of the season in La Liga as the game ended as a goalless draw. On 27 September, Barcelona played against Granada at Camp Nou. Barcelona kept up home form with a big win thanks to Neymar's first hat-trick of the season and a brace from Messi; the other goal came from Rakitić. On 30 September, Barcelona played its second match in the Champions League, against Paris Saint-Germain at the Parc des Princes. It was the first defeat of the season and also the first time in the season Barça conceded a goal; PSG won 3–2, were goals from Messi and Neymar were not enough to escape defeat.

=== October ===
On 4 October, Barcelona played Rayo Vallecano at the Campo de Vallecas. In an eventual 0–2 win with goals from Messi and Neymar, goalkeeper Claudio Bravo made La Liga history by going 630 minutes without conceding a goal, surpassing former Barça goalkeeper Pedro María Artola's record of 560 minutes, set in 1978. After an international break, Barcelona faced Eibar at Camp Nou on 18 October. Barça won the match 3–0, with late goals from Messi, Neymar and Xavi. On 21 October, Barcelona hosted Ajax at Camp Nou. Goals from Messi and Neymar and a late goal from youngster Sandro gave Barcelona a comfortable 3–1 win. On 25 October, Barcelona played the first Clásico of the season at the Santiago Bernabéu. This was the official debut match of star forward Luis Suárez due to his ban for biting Italy defender Giorgio Chellini during the 2014 FIFA World Cup. Neymar gave Barcelona an early lead but Barcelona could not further capitalize on the lead; a converted penalty from Cristiano Ronaldo and goals from Pepe and Karim Benzema resulted in a 3–1 defeat. This was the first defeat for Barcelona in their 2014–15 Liga campaign. Claudio Bravo's clean sheet run ended at 754 minutes..

=== November ===
On 1 November, Barcelona played against Celta de Vigo. Barcelona's losing streak continued as they experienced their first home defeat of the season at Camp Nou; a single goal from Joaquín Larrivey decided the outcome of the match. Barça were down to the fourth position in the league table with the loss. On 5 November, Barca played against Ajax at Amsterdam Arena; Messi scored a brace as Barcelona won the match 0–2. With these two goals, Messi equalized the Raúl's record as the all-time top scorer in the UEFA Champions League.

On 8 November, Barcelona visited Juegos Mediterráneos to play against Almería. Barcelona earned a hard-fought win thanks to late goals from Neymar and Jordi Alba as Thievy Bifouma gave Almería the lead after 37 minutes. This win brought Barcelona to second in the table. After the last international break of the year, Barça took on Sevilla at Camp Nou, winning 5–1 off goals by Neymar and Rakitić and a hat-trick from Messi, with Alba scoring an own goal. With his second goal, Messi broke the record of Telmo Zarra to become the all-time top scorer of La Liga.

On 25 November, Barça won 0–4 against APOEL at GSP Stadium of Nicosia, Cyprus. Messi scored a hat-trick and Luis Suárez scored his first official goal for Barcelona. The hat-trick made Messi the all-time top scorer of the Champions League, surpassing Raúl. On 30 November, Barcelona earned a dramatic win against Valencia at Mestalla after an injury time goal from Sergio Busquets gave Barça the 0–1 win. At the time of celebrating the goal, Messi was struck by a bottle by a Valencia fan. When Messi tried to report the incident to referee, he was shown a yellow card due to misunderstanding. Later on, due to the appeal from the club, the card was rescinded.

=== December ===
On 2 December, Barcelona defender Thomas Vermaelen, who was yet to make his official debut with Barcelona, underwent successful knee surgery in Finland. He would be out for next five-to-six months. Barcelona played the first match of 2014–15 Copa del Rey against Huesca at Estadio El Alcoraz on 3 December 2014. They won the round of 32 first leg by 0–4. Rakitić, Andrés Iniesta, Pedro and Rafinha scored the goals. Luis Enrique rested many of first team starters and handed Barça B defender Edgar Ié his debut. On 7 December, Barcelona played against Espanyol, the first Catalan Derby of 2014–15 La Liga at Camp Nou. Espanyol took the lead by a goal from Sergio García, but Barcelona eventually won the match 5–1 thanks to a hat-trick from Messi and goals from Piqué and Pedro. On 10 December, Barca played last match of the 2014–15 UEFA Champions League group stage, against Paris Saint-Germain at Camp Nou. The lead given by Zlatan Ibrahimović for PSG did not last long, as goals from Messi, Neymar and Suárez gave Barcelona the 3–1 win, ensuring the top spot in Group F. Barça played against Getafe on 13 December at Coliseum Alfonso Pérez; the match ended in a goalless draw.

On 16 December, Barca played against Huesca in the second leg of Copa del Rey at Camp Nou. Huesca was thrashed 8–1 as Pedro scored a hat-trick and Barça B winger Adama Traoré scoring his first goal of the season for the first team. Other goalscorers were Sergi Roberto, Iniesta, Adriano and Sandro. A goal from Carlos David only minimised the difference. By their 12–1 aggregate win, Barcelona are through to the last 16 of the Copa del Rey. Barça took on Córdoba at Camp Nou on 20 December, the last match of the 2014 calendar year. Barcelona ended the year with a convincing 5–0 win off goals from Pedro, Suárez, Piqué and a late double from Messi. On 30 December, Barça's appeal against two window transfer ban allotted by FIFA was rejected by CAS. As a result, Barcelona will not be allowed to sign any new player until January 2016 and have to pay a fine of approximately €375,000.

=== January ===
Barcelona's new year started on 4 January with an away match against Real Sociedad at Anoeta Stadium. A poor start for Barcelona as they lost the match 1–0. An own goal from Jordi Alba decided the result. On 5 January, Barcelona announced that they had terminated the contract of director of football Andoni Zubizarreta. He had been sacked after serving for more than four years starting from July 2010. On the same day, Carles Puyol, the assistant director of football, quit his position. On 7 January, club president Josep Maria Bartomeu called for early presidential election at the end of the 2014–15 season.

On 8 January, Barcelona played the first leg of Round of 16 of Copa del Rey against Elche at Camp Nou. Barça won the match 5–0 from a brace by Neymar and goals from Suárez, Alba and a penalty from Messi. On 11 January, Barcelona played against Atlético Madrid at Camp Nou, winning 3–1. Neymar, Suárez and Messi scored for Barça, and Mario Mandžukić reduced the gap from a penalty for Atlético. On 15 January, Barcelona played against Elche in the second leg of Round of 16 of Copa del Rey at Estadio Manuel Martínez Valero. Despite resting many first team players, Barca won 4–0 as Jérémy Mathieu, Sergi Roberto, Pedro and Adriano scored. With the win, Barça were through to the Quarter-finals of Copa del Rey with an aggregate 9–0 victory.

On 18 January, Barça took on Deportivo at Estadio Riazor, the last match of the first half of La Liga. Barca won the match 0–4 from Messi's hat-trick and an own goal by Sidnei. It was Messi's 22nd career hat-trick in La Liga. On 21 January, the first leg of quarter-finals of Copa del Rey took place between Barcelona and Atlético Madrid at Camp Nou, where Barça won 1–0 thanks to a late goal from Messi. On 24 January, Barca played against Elche at Estadio Manuel Martínez Valero. Barça won the match 0–6 as Messi and Neymar scored braces and Pedro and Piqué each scored once. Barça defeated Atlético Madrid in the second leg of the quarter-finals of Copa del Rey 2–3 goals on 28 January at the Vicente Calderón, completing a 4–2 aggregate win. Neymar scored a brace and Miranda scored an own goal for Barcelona, while Fernando Torres and Raúl García scored for Atlético.

=== February ===
On 1 February, Barcelona played the 21st match of La Liga against Villarreal at Camp Nou. Barça won the thrilling encounter 3-2 thanks to goals from Neymar, Rafinha and Messi; Denis Cheryshev and Luciano Vietto scored for Villarreal. On 8 February, Barcelona played Athletic Bilbao at the San Mamés Stadium in Bilbao. Barcelona won the match 5–2 as Messi, Luis Suárez, Neymar and Pedro scored. The other Barcelona goal was an own goal by Óscar de Marcos, while Mikel Rico and Aritz Aduriz reduced the gap for Athletic. On 11 February, Barcelona played Villarreal in the first leg of semi-finals of Copa del Rey at Camp Nou. Barça won the match 3–1 as Messi, Iniesta and Piqué scored for Barcelona, while Manu Trigueros scored for Villarreal. Neymar, meanwhile, missed a penalty.

On 15 February, Barcelona played the 23rd match of La Liga against Levante at the Camp Nou. It was Messi's 300th La Liga appearance. Barcelona won the match 5–0 as Messi scored his 23rd La Liga hat-trick, while Neymar and Suárez scored one each. On 21 February, Barça's eleven-match winning streak came to an end as they lost to Málaga, 1–0. Juanmi scored the only goal at Camp Nou. On 25 February, FC Barcelona flew to the Etihad Stadium in Manchester to play the first leg of the Champions League Round of 16 against Manchester City. Barça won the game 2–1 thanks to a brace from Suárez. Sergio Agüero reduced the gap for City in the second half of the game. On 28 February, Barcelona took on Granada at the Estadio Nuevo Los Cármenes. The Blaugranes won the match 3–1. The goals were scored by Rakitić and Suárez. Fran Rico scored for Granada, however Messi ensured Barça's victory by scoring his 27th league goal of the season.

=== March ===
On 4 March, Barcelona played the second leg of semi-finals of Copa del Rey against Villarreal at El Madrigal. Barça won the match 1–3 and went through to the final by a 6–2 aggregate scoreline. Neymar scored a brace while Suárez added one; Jonathan dos Santos scored the only goal for Villarreal. On 8 March, Barça played the 26th match of La Liga against Rayo Vallecano at Camp Nou, winning 6–1 as Messi scored his 24th La Liga hat-trick, Suárez scored a brace and Piqué scored the other. Alberto Bueno reduced the gap from a penalty while Dani Alves was sent off. With his hat-trick, Messi set the record for most hat-tricks in the history of La Liga. Additionally, Barcelona climbed to the top position of the league table with this win.

On 14 March, Barça took on Eibar at the Ipurua Municipal Stadium. Messi scored both goals as Barça won 0–2. On 18 March, Barça faced Manchester City at home for the second leg of Champions League round of 16. Barça won 1–0 on a goal by Rakitić, and as a result, Barcelona qualified for the quarter-final with a 3–1 aggregate score. Barcelona were drawn with Paris Saint-Germain in the quarter-finals draw. The second El Clásico of the Liga season was held on 22 March, during which Barcelona defeated their archrivals 2–1 at Camp Nou. The opener from Jérémy Mathieu was canceled out by Cristiano Ronaldo, but Suárez ensured a victory for Barcelona after scoring his team's second. Mathieu scored the first goal of his Barça career on the match. The win gave Barça a four-point lead over Real Madrid at the top of the table.

=== April ===
On 5 April, Barcelona played their 29th La Liga match at the Balaídos and won 0–1 against Celta Vigo, with the only goal scored by Mathieu. On 8 April, Barça took on Almería at Camp Nou, defeating the visitors 4–0, as Suárez scored a brace and Messi and Marc Bartra scored one each. On 11 April, Barcelona played against Sevilla at the Ramón Sánchez Pizjuán. The teams drew 2–2, which saw Barcelona's table lead fall to two points.

On 15 April, Barcelona flew to the Parc des Princes in Paris to play the first leg of the Champions League quarter-finals against Paris Saint-Germain. Barça won the game 1–3 via a brace from Suárez and a goal from Neymar. Mathieu reduced the gap for PSG by scoring an own goal in the second half of the game. On 18 April, Barcelona took on Valencia at home, winning 2–0 after an opening goal by Suárez and a late goal by Messi in the injury time, his 400th career goal for Barça. On 21 April, Barca took on PSG at the Camp Nou for the second leg of Champions League quarter-finals. Neymar scored both goals as Barça won 2–0, thus qualifying for the semi-finals with a 5–1 aggregate score. With victory, Barcelona reached the Champions League semi-finals for the seventh time in the last eight years.

Barcelona were drawn with Bayern Munich in the semi-finals during the semi-final draw in Nyon. On 25 April, Barcelona defeated Espanyol 0–2 at the Cornellà-El Prat and won the second derby of the season. On 28 April, Barça played its 34th match of the league season against Getafe at the Camp Nou, winning 6–0 as Messi and Suárez each scored a brace and Neymar and Xavi each got a goal.

=== May ===
On 2 May, Barcelona took on Córdoba at Estadio Nuevo Arcángel. Barcelona won the match 0–8 as Suárez scored his first Barcelona hat-trick, Messi scored twice and Neymar, Rakitić and Piqué each scored one. Messi had a chance to score a hat-trick when Córdoba conceded a penalty but he gave the chance to Neymar, who duly obliged. On 6 May, Barcelona played the first leg of the semi-finals of the Champions League against Bayern Munich, winning 3–0 as Messi scored twice in three minutes and assisted for Neymar, who scored one in injury time. Messi's second goal in the match won the UEFA Goal of the Year award.

On 9 May, Barcelona played the 2014–15 La Liga 36th matchday at Camp Nou against Real Sociedad, a game Barça won 2–0, with Neymar scoring the first with a header and Pedro scoring the second goal with a bicycle kick. With the win, Barcelona were one win away from winning the 2014–15 La Liga title as they were four points above Real Madrid with only two games left. On 12 May, Barcelona flew to the Allianz Arena in Munich to play the second leg of the semi-finals of the Champions League against Bayern Munich. Neymar scored both goals in a 2–3 Barça loss, though the team nonetheless won 5–3 on aggregate and booked their place in the final of Champions League. On 17 May, Barcelona clinched their 23rd La Liga title after winning 0–1 against Atlético Madrid at the Vicente Calderón. The game's only goal, by Messi, was enough to win the title. This was Barcelona's seventh La Liga title in the last ten years. On 21 May, Xavi had announced that he will leave Barcelona at the end of the season for Al-Sadd in Qatar.

On 23 May, Barcelona played the final match of La Liga against Deportivo at Camp Nou; Messi scored twice in the 2–2 draw. This was Xavi's last La Liga match. On 30 May, Barca took on Athletic Bilbao to play the final of the Copa del Rey at the Camp Nou. Barcelona won the match 3–1, clinching their 27th title. Messi scored twice, with the other scored by Neymar. Messi's first goal was scored through an impressive dribble on the right flank. The move started with Messi close to the half-way line. Cornered by four Bilbao players, Messi burst on and managed to beat them all with abnormal ease before running towards the goal and calmly slotting the ball past the goalkeeper. Messi's goal was subsequently nominated for the FIFA Puskás Award, an award given to the best goal of the year.

=== June ===
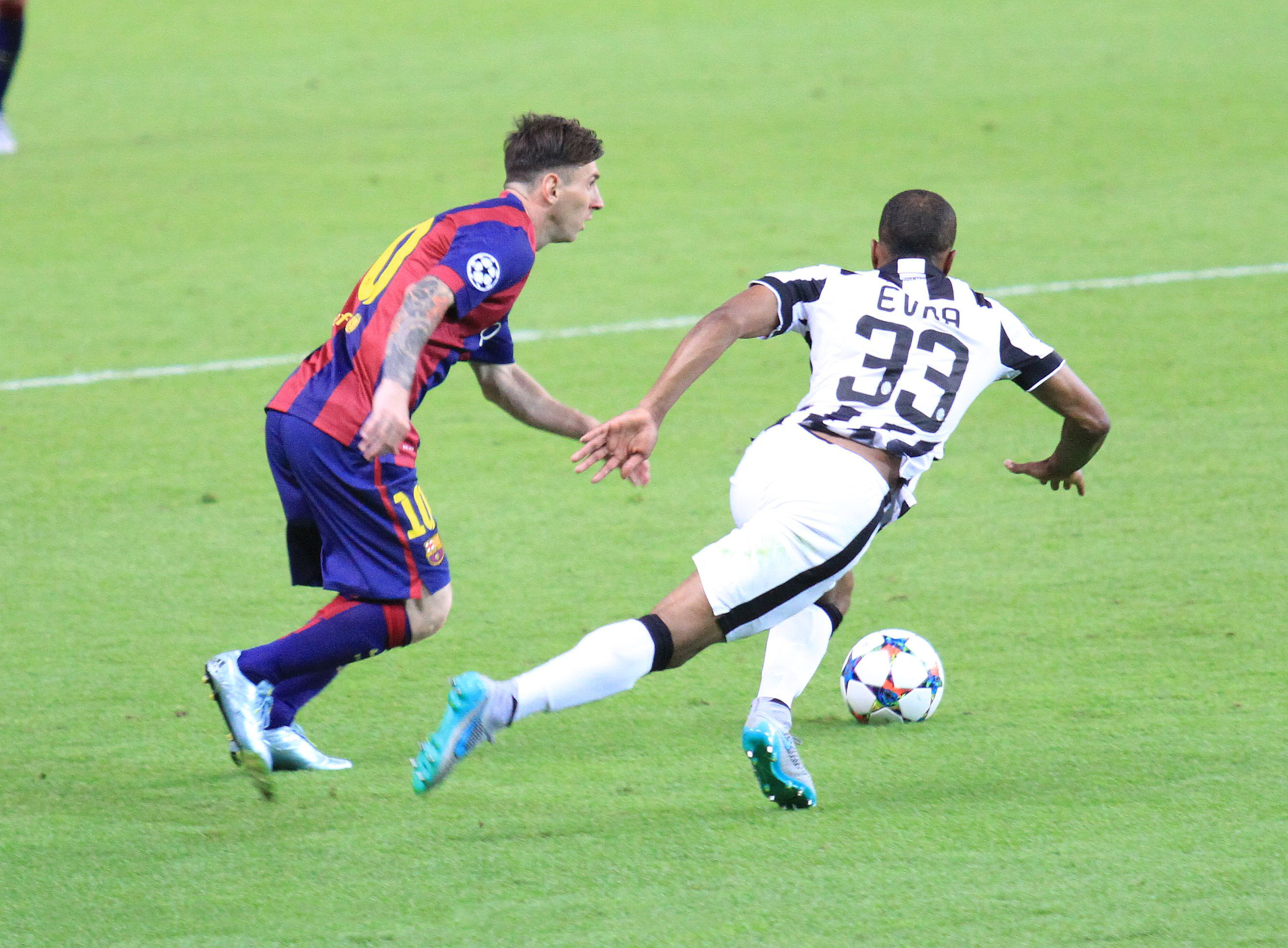
Messi challenging Patrice Evra in the Champions League Final

On 6 June, Barcelona played the 2015 UEFA Champions League Final against Juventus with the opportunity for both teams to complete the continental treble, after having already won their domestic league and cup competitions, respectively. Barcelona clinched their fifth Champions League trophy, and fourth in the last ten seasons, with a 3–1 victory over I bianconeri at the Olympiastadion in Berlin. Barcelona completed the historic treble with goals from Rakitić, Suárez and Neymar. By accomplishing this feat, Barcelona became the only European club to have won the treble twice. With the win, Barcelona qualified for the 2015 UEFA Super Cup against the 2014–15 UEFA Europa League winners Sevilla, to be played in August 2015.

== Players ==
=== Squad information ===
N	Pos.	Nat.	Name	Age	EU	Since	App	Goals	Ends	Transfer fee	Notes
1	GK	(Germany)	Marc-André ter Stegen	23	EU	2014	21	0	2019	€12M	
2	RB	(Spain)	Martín Montoya	24	EU	2011	67	2	2018	Youth system	
3	DF	(Spain)	Gerard Piqué	28	EU	2008	310	27	2019	€5M	From Youth system
4	MF	(Croatia)	Ivan Rakitić	27	EU	2014	51	8	2019	€18M	Second nationality: Switzerland
5	MF	(Spain)	Sergio Busquets (4th captain)	26	EU	2008	331	12	2019	Youth system	
6	MF	(Spain)	Xavi (captain)	35	EU	1998	767	83	2016	Youth system	
7	FW	(Spain)	Pedro	27	EU	2008	318	98	2019	Youth system	
8	MF	(Spain)	Andrés Iniesta (vice-captain)	31	EU	2002	549	53	2018	Youth system	
9	FW	(Uruguay)	Luis Suárez	28	Non-EU	2014	43	25	2019	€81M	
10	FW	(Argentina)	Lionel Messi (3rd captain)	27	EU	2004	482	412	2018	Youth system	Second nationality: Spain
11	FW	(Brazil)	Neymar	23	Non-EU	2013	92	54	2018	€86M	
12	MF	(Brazil)	Rafinha	22	EU	2011	39	2	2016	Youth system	Second nationality: Spain
13	GK	(Chile)	Claudio Bravo	32	EU	2014	37	0	2018	€12M	Second nationality: Spain
14	MF	(Argentina)	Javier Mascherano	30	EU	2010	231	0	2018	€22M	Second nationality: Italy
15	DF	(Spain)	Marc Bartra	24	EU	2010	79	4	2017	Youth system	
16	RB	(Brazil)	Douglas	24	Non-EU	2014	4	0	2019	€4M	
18	LB	(Spain)	Jordi Alba	26	EU	2012	114	7	2020	€14M	From Youth system
20	MF	(Spain)	Sergi Roberto	23	EU	2012	53	4	2019	Youth system	
21	LB	(Brazil)	Adriano	30	EU	2010	170	16	2017	€9.5M	Second nationality: Spain
22	RB	(Brazil)	Dani Alves	32	EU	2009	343	20	2015	€30M	Second nationality: Spain
23	DF	(Belgium)	Thomas Vermaelen	29	EU	2014	1	0	2019	€10M	
24	DF	(France)	Jérémy Mathieu	31	EU	2014	41	3	2018	€20M	
25	GK	(Spain)	Jordi Masip	26	EU	2014	2	0	2017	Youth system	

- Last updated: 6 June 2015
- Source: FCBarcelona.com, Players in / out, Wikipedia players' articles, ESPN (for appearances and goals) and footballdatabase.com (for EU passport)

=== From the youth squad ===
Note: Flags indicate national team as defined under FIFA eligibility rules; some limited exceptions apply. Players may hold more than one non-FIFA nationality.

No.	Pos.	Nation	Player
26	MF	ESP	Sergi Samper
27	MF	ESP	Adama Traoré
28	DF	ESP	Álex Grimaldo
29	FW	ESP	Sandro
30	MF	CRO	Alen Halilović

No.	Pos.	Nation	Player
31	FW	MAR	Munir
32	DF	POR	Edgar Ié
33	DF	SEN	Diawandou Diagne
34	GK	CMR	Fabrice Ondoa
35	MF	ESP	Gerard Gumbau

Source: UEFA.com

=== Transfers in ===
No.	Pos.	Nat.	Name	Age	EU	Moving from	Type	Transfer window	Ends	Transfer fee	Source
1	GK	(Germany)	Marc-André ter Stegen	22	EU	(Germany) Mönchengladbach	Transfer	Summer	2019	€12M	FCBarcelona.com
—	FW	(Spain)	Gerard Deulofeu	20	EU	(England) Everton	Loan return	Summer	2019	Free	FCBarcelona.com
12	MF	(Brazil)	Rafinha	21	EU	Celta Vigo	Loan return	Summer	2016	Free	FCBarcelona.com
4	MF	(Croatia)	Ivan Rakitić	26	EU	Sevilla	Transfer	Summer	2019	€18M+Suárez loan	FCBarcelona.com
13	GK	(Chile)	Claudio Bravo	31	EU	Real Sociedad	Transfer	Summer	2018	€12M	FCBarcelona.com
9	FW	(Uruguay)	Luis Suárez	27	Non-EU	(England) Liverpool	Transfer	Summer	2019	€81.25M	FCBarcelona.com
24	DF	(France)	Jérémy Mathieu	30	EU	Valencia	Transfer	Summer	2018	€20M	FCBarcelona.com
23	DF	(Belgium)	Thomas Vermaelen	28	EU	(England) Arsenal	Transfer	Summer	2019	€18M	FCBarcelona.com
16	RB	(Brazil)	Douglas	24	Non-EU	(Brazil) São Paulo	Transfer	Summer	2019	€4M	FCBarcelona.com

Total spending: ▼€165.25 million

=== Transfers out ===
No.	Pos.	Nat.	Name	Age	EU	Moving to	Type	Transfer window	Transfer fee	Source
1	GK	(Spain)	Víctor Valdés	32	EU	Manchester United (England)	End of contract	Summer	Free	FCBarcelona.com
5	DF	(Spain)	Carles Puyol	36	EU		Retirement	Summer	Free	FCBarcelona.com
13	GK	(Spain)	José Manuel Pinto	38	EU		End of contract	Summer	Free	FCBarcelona.com
4	MF	(Spain)	Cesc Fàbregas	27	EU	Chelsea (England)	Transfer	Summer	€33M	FCBarcelona.com
–	MF	(Spain)	Denis Suárez	20	EU	Sevilla	Loan	Summer	N/A	FCBarcelona.com
12	MF	(Mexico)	Jonathan dos Santos	24	EU	Villarreal	Transfer	Summer	€1.5M	FCBarcelona.com
23	FW	(Spain)	Isaac Cuenca	23	EU	Deportivo La Coruña	Contract termination	Summer	Free	FCBarcelona.com
9	FW	(Chile)	Alexis Sánchez	25	Non-EU	Arsenal (England)	Transfer	Summer	€42.5M	FCBarcelona.com
25	GK	(Spain)	Oier	24	EU	Granada	Transfer	Summer	Free	FCBarcelona.com
–	FW	(Brazil)	Keirrison	25	Non-EU	(Brazil) Coritiba	End of contract	Summer	Free	Coritiba.com.br
20	FW	(Spain)	Cristian Tello	22	EU	(Portugal) Porto	Loan	Summer	€2M+€8M purchase option	FCBarcelona.com
–	FW	(Spain)	Bojan	23	EU	(England) Stoke City	Transfer	Summer	€1.8M	FCBarcelona.com
19	FW	(Netherlands)	Ibrahim Afellay	28	EU	(Greece) Olympiacos	Loan	Summer	N/A	FCBarcelona.com
–	FW	(Spain)	Gerard Deulofeu	20	EU	Sevilla	Loan	Summer	N/A	FCBarcelona.com
17	MF	(Cameroon)	Alex Song	26	EU	(England) West Ham	Loan	Summer	N/A	FCBarcelona.com

Total income: ▲€80.8 million

Total expenditure: ▼€84.45 million

== Technical staff ==
Position	Staff
First team head coach	Luis Enrique
Assistant coach	Juan Carlos Unzué
Assistant	Robert Moreno
Auxiliary coach	Joan Barbarà
Fitness coach	Rafa Pol; Eduardo Pons; Francesc Cos; Paco Seiruŀlo
Goalkeeping coach	José Ramón de la Fuente
Scoutings	Àlex García; Jordi Melero; Jaume Torras
Physiotherapist	Jaume Minull; Juanjo Brau; Roger Gironès; Xavi Linde
Psychologist	Joaquín Valdés
Doctor	Ramón Canal; Ricard Pruna; Daniel Medina
Team liaison	Carles Naval
Football Area Technical Commission	Jordi Mestre; Javier Borda; Carles Rexach; Ariedo Braida
Academy director	Jordi Roura
B team coach	Jordi Vinyals

Last updated: 9 May 2014
Source: FC Barcelona

== Statistics ==
=== Squad, appearances and goals ===
Last updated on 6 June 2015.

No.	Pos	Nat	Player	Total		La Liga		Copa del Rey		UEFA Champions League	
No.	Pos	Nat	Player	Apps	Goals	Apps	Goals	Apps	Goals	Apps	Goals
Goalkeepers
1	GK	(Germany) GER	Marc-André ter Stegen	21	0	0	0	8	0	13	0
13	GK	(Chile) CHI	Claudio Bravo	37	0	37	0	0	0	0	0
25	GK	(Spain) ESP	Jordi Masip	2	0	1	0	1	0	0	0
Defenders
2	DF	(Spain) ESP	Martín Montoya	12	0	6+2	0	3	0	1	0
3	DF	(Spain) ESP	Gerard Piqué	44	7	26+1	5	6	1	11	1
14	DF	(Argentina) ARG	Javier Mascherano	47	0	26+2	0	7	0	12	0
15	DF	(Spain) ESP	Marc Bartra	25	1	11+3	1	4+1	0	5+1	0
16	DF	(Brazil) BRA	Douglas	5	0	1+1	0	1+2	0	0	0
18	DF	(Spain) ESP	Jordi Alba	44	2	27	1	6	1	11	0
20	DF	(Spain) ESP	Sergi Roberto	18	2	4+8	0	3+1	2	1+1	0
21	DF	(Brazil) BRA	Adriano	27	2	10+6	0	3+1	2	1+6	0
22	DF	(Brazil) BRA	Dani Alves	46	0	29+1	0	5	0	11	0
23	DF	(Belgium) BEL	Thomas Vermaelen	1	0	1	0	0	0	0	0
24	DF	(France) FRA	Jérémy Mathieu	41	3	23+5	2	3+3	1	3+4	0
32	DF	(Portugal) POR	Edgar Ié	1	0	0	0	0+1	0	0	0
Midfielders
4	MF	(Croatia) CRO	Ivan Rakitić	51	8	23+9	5	5+2	1	11+1	2
5	MF	(Spain) ESP	Sergio Busquets	47	1	29+4	1	4	0	9+1	0
6	MF	(Spain) ESP	Xavi	44	2	19+12	2	0+3	0	2+8	0
8	MF	(Spain) ESP	Andrés Iniesta	42	3	19+5	0	7	3	10+1	0
12	MF	(Brazil) BRA	Rafinha	36	2	13+11	1	5+1	1	1+5	0
26	MF	(Spain) ESP	Sergi Samper	4	0	0	0	2+1	0	1	0
27	MF	(Spain) ESP	Adama Traoré	2	1	0	0	1+1	1	0	0
30	MF	(Croatia) CRO	Alen Halilović	1	0	0	0	0+1	0	0	0
35	MF	(Spain) ESP	Gerard Gumbau	1	0	0	0	1	0	0	0
Forwards
7	FW	(Spain) ESP	Pedro	50	11	15+20	6	3+3	5	4+5	0
9	FW	(Uruguay) URU	Luis Suárez	43	25	25+2	16	6	2	10	7
10	FW	(Argentina) ARG	Lionel Messi	57	58	37+1	43	6	5	13	10
11	FW	(Brazil) BRA	Neymar	51	39	29+4	22	6	7	12	10
29	FW	(Spain) ESP	Sandro Ramírez	12	4	0+7	2	0+2	1	0+3	1
31	FW	(Spain) ESP	Munir El Haddadi	16	1	7+3	1	3	0	1+2	0

== Pre-season and friendlies ==
Win Draw Loss

19 July 2014 Colombino Trophy	Recreativo Huelva	0–1	Barcelona	Huelva, Spain
20:45	Dimas (yellow card) 60'	Report	Román 67'	Stadium: Nuevo Colombino; Attendance: 5,629; Referee: Jorge Vásquez (Spain)

2 August 2014 Friendly	Nice	1–1	Barcelona	Nice, France
20:45	Cvitanich 21' (pen.); Pied (yellow card) 22'; Amavi (yellow card) 41'; Bosetti (yellow card) 90+2'	Report	Piqué (yellow card) 21'; Iniesta (yellow card) 44'; Xavi 68' (pen.)	Stadium: Allianz Riviera; Attendance: 21,847; Referee: Ruddy Buquet (France)

6 August 2014 Friendly	Napoli	1–0	Barcelona	Geneva, Switzerland
20:00	Koulibaly (yellow card) 41'; Džemaili 80'	Report		Stadium: Stade de Genève; Attendance: 14,852; Referee: Stephan Studer (Switzerland)

9 August 2014 Friendly	HJK	0–6	Barcelona	Helsinki, Finland
16:00		Report	Munir 5', 17'; Roberto 9'; Piqué 24'; Bartra 50'; Sandro 82'	Stadium: Helsinki Olympic Stadium; Attendance: 40,435; Referee: Mattias Gestranius (Finland)

18 August 2014 Joan Gamper Trophy	Barcelona	6–0	León	Barcelona, Spain
20:30	Messi 3'; Neymar 12', 44'; Munir 55', 78'; Sandro 89'	Report		Stadium: Camp Nou; Attendance: 72,475; Referee: Álvarez Izquierdo (Spain)

== Competitions ==
=== La Liga ===
==== League table ====
Pos	Team	Pld	W	D	L	GF	GA	GD	Pts	Qualification or relegation
1	Barcelona (C)	38	30	4	4	110	21	+89	94	Qualification for the Champions League group stage
2	Real Madrid	38	30	2	6	118	38	+80	92	Qualification for the Champions League group stage
3	Atlético Madrid	38	23	9	6	67	29	+38	78	Qualification for the Champions League group stage
4	Valencia	38	22	11	5	70	32	+38	77	Qualification for the Champions League play-off round
5	Sevilla	38	23	7	8	71	45	+26	76	Qualification for the Champions League group stage (Note: Sevilla qualified for the Champions League group stage by winning the 2014–15 UEFA Europa League. As a result, the fifth-placed spot for the Europa League group stage they earned was vacated without replacement as per UEFA regulations.)

Source: La Liga
Rules for classification: 1) points; 2) head-to-head points; 3) head-to-head goal difference; 4) goal difference; 5) number of goals scored; 6) fair-play points; 7) playoff match
(C) Champions

==== Results by round ====
Round	1	2	3	4	5	6	7	8	9	10	11	12	13	14	15	16	17	18	19	20	21	22	23	24	25	26	27	28	29	30	31	32	33	34	35	36	37	38
Ground	H	A	H	A	A	H	A	H	A	H	A	H	A	H	A	H	A	H	A	A	H	A	H	H	A	H	A	H	A	H	A	H	A	H	A	H	A	H
Result	W	W	W	W	D	W	W	W	L	L	W	W	W	W	D	W	L	W	W	W	W	W	W	L	W	W	W	W	W	W	D	W	W	W	W	W	W	D
Position	1	1	1	1	2	1	1	1	1	4	2	2	2	2	2	2	2	2	2	2	2	2	2	2	2	1	1	1	1	1	1	1	1	1	1	1	1	1

Updated to match(es) played on 24 May 2015. Source: Competitive matches
A = Away; H = Home; W = Win; D = Draw; L = Loss

==== Matches ====
24 August 2014 1	Barcelona	3–0	Elche	Barcelona
21:00 CEST (UTC+02:00)	Messi 42', 63'; Mascherano (red card) 43'; Munir 46'	Report	Pašalić (yellow card) 55'	Stadium: Camp Nou; Attendance: 68,105; Referee: Fernando Teixeira Vitienes (Cantabria)

31 August 2014 2	Villarreal	0–1	Barcelona	Villarreal
19:00 CEST (UTC+02:00)		Report	Pedro (yellow card) 37'; Dani Alves (yellow card) 42'; Sandro 82'	Stadium: El Madrigal; Attendance: 21,200; Referee: Carlos Velasco Carballo (Community of Madrid)

13 September 2014 3	Barcelona	2–0	Athletic Bilbao	Barcelona
16:00 CEST (UTC+02:00)	Busquets (yellow card) 63'; Neymar 79', 84'	Report	Aduriz (yellow card) 30'	Stadium: Camp Nou; Attendance: 80,181; Referee: David Fernández Borbalán (Andalusia)

21 September 2014 4	Levante	0–5	Barcelona	Valencia
21:00 CEST (UTC+02:00)	Morales (yellow card) 39'; Vyntra (red card) 41'	Report	Neymar 34'; Mascherano (yellow card) 36'; Messi (penalty missed) 42', 77'; Busquets (yellow card) 43'; Rakitić 44'; Sandro 57'; Pedro 64'	Stadium: Ciutat de València; Attendance: 22,177; Referee: José Luis González González (Castile and León)

24 September 2014 5	Málaga	0–0	Barcelona	Málaga
22:00 CEST (UTC+02:00)	Rosales (yellow card) 73'; Weligton (yellow card) 83'	Report	Douglas (yellow card) 70'; Piqué (yellow card) 83'	Stadium: La Rosaleda; Attendance: 24,820; Referee: Alejandro José Hernández Hernández (Canary Islands)

27 September 2014 6	Barcelona	6–0	Granada	Barcelona
18:00 CEST (UTC+02:00)	Neymar 26', 45', 66'; Rakitić 43'; Messi 62', 82'; Dani Alves (yellow card) 81'	Report	Rico (yellow card) 34'; Foulquier (yellow card) 84'	Stadium: Camp Nou; Attendance: 72,596; Referee: Juan Martínez Munuera (Valencian Community)

4 October 2014 7	Rayo Vallecano	0–2	Barcelona	Madrid
18:00 CEST (UTC+02:00)	Ba (yellow card) 18'; Trashorras (yellow card) 33'; Morcillo (yellow card) 37' (yellow-red card) 60'; Aquino (yellow card) 63' (yellow-red card) 90+1'	Report	Xavi (yellow card) 10'; Messi 35'; Neymar 36'; Piqué (yellow card) 73'	Stadium: Campo de Vallecas; Attendance: 14,070; Referee: Antonio Mateu Lahoz (Valencian Community)

18 October 2014 8	Barcelona	3–0	Eibar	Barcelona
20:00 CEST (UTC+02:00)	Neymar (yellow card) 40', (goal) 72'; Xavi 60'; Messi 74'; Iniesta (yellow card) 82'	Report	Lillo (yellow card) 45'; Lara (yellow card) 53'	Stadium: Camp Nou; Attendance: 75,546; Referee: Fernando Teixeira Vitienes (Cantabria)

25 October 2014 9	Real Madrid	3–1	Barcelona	Madrid
18:00 CEST (UTC+02:00)	Ronaldo 35' (pen.), (yellow card) 90+3'; Pepe 50'; Benzema 61'; Carvajal (yellow card) 74'	Report	Neymar 4', (yellow card) 14'; Messi (yellow card) 9'; Piqué (yellow card) 34'; Iniesta (yellow card) 38'	Stadium: Santiago Bernabéu; Attendance: 85,450; Referee: Jesús Gil Manzano (Extremadura)

1 November 2014 10	Barcelona	0–1	Celta Vigo	Barcelona
20:00 CET (UTC+01:00)	Pedro (yellow card) 90+3'	Report	Hernández (yellow card) 14'; Larrivey 55'; S. Gómez (yellow card) 73'	Stadium: Camp Nou; Attendance: 71,468; Referee: Iñaki Vicandi Garrido (Basque Country)

8 November 2014 11	Almería	1–2	Barcelona	Almería
16:00 CET (UTC+01:00)	Thomas (yellow card) 31'; Soriano (yellow card) 35'; Thievy 37'	Report	Neymar 73'; Alba 82'	Stadium: Juegos Mediterráneos; Attendance: 12,606; Referee: Alberto Undiano Mallenco (Navarre)

22 November 2014 12	Barcelona	5–1	Sevilla	Barcelona
20:00 CET (UTC+01:00)	Messi 21', 72', 77'; Neymar 49'; Mathieu (yellow card) 56'; Rakitić 65'	Report	Coke (yellow card) 36'; Alba 47' (o.g.); Pareja (yellow card) 48'	Stadium: Camp Nou; Attendance: 78,283; Referee: Juan Martínez Munuera (Valencian Community)

30 November 2014 13	Valencia	0–1	Barcelona	Valencia
21:00 CET (UTC+01:00)	Barragán (yellow card) 20'; Mustafi (yellow card) 27'; Rodrigo (yellow card) 70'	Report	Mathieu (yellow card) 8'; Piqué (yellow card) 20'; Alba (yellow card) 29'; Busquets 90+4'; Messi (yellow card) 90+5'	Stadium: Mestalla; Attendance: 51,200; Referee: David Fernández Borbalán (Andalusia)

7 December 2014 14	Barcelona	5–1	Espanyol	Barcelona
17:00 CET (UTC+01:00)	Messi 45', 50', 81'; Piqué 53'; Pedro 77'	Report	S. García 13'; Sevilla (yellow card) 29'; Vázquez (yellow card) 52'; Álvaro (yellow card) 69'; Arbilla (yellow card) 79'	Stadium: Camp Nou; Attendance: 76,057; Referee: Ignacio Iglesias Villanueva (Galicia)

13 December 2014 15	Getafe	0–0	Barcelona	Getafe
16:00 CET (UTC+01:00)	Sarabia (yellow card) 65'; Castro (yellow card) 90+5'	Report		Stadium: Coliseum Alfonso Pérez; Attendance: 9,500; Referee: Iñaki Vicandi Garrido (Basque Country)

20 December 2014 16	Barcelona	5–0	Córdoba	Barcelona
16:00 CET (UTC+01:00)	Pedro 2'; Suárez 53'; Busquets (yellow card) 66'; Piqué 80'; Messi 82', 90+1'	Report		Stadium: Camp Nou; Attendance: 60,066; Referee: Antonio Mateu Lahoz (Valencian Community)

4 January 2015 17	Real Sociedad	1–0	Barcelona	San Sebastián
21:00 CET (UTC+01:00)	Alba 2' (o.g.); Vela (yellow card) 39'; I. Martínez (yellow card) 43'; Granero (yellow card) 51'; Finnbogason (yellow card) 89'; Bergara (yellow card) 90+2'	Report	Mathieu (yellow card) 34'; Dani Alves (yellow card) 76'; Alba (yellow card) 89'; Neymar (yellow card) 90+3'	Stadium: Anoeta; Attendance: 28,748; Referee: Carlos del Cerro Grande (Community of Madrid)

11 January 2015 18	Barcelona	3–1	Atlético Madrid	Barcelona
21:00 CET (UTC+01:00)	Neymar 12'; Suárez 35', (yellow card) 59'; Mascherano (yellow card) 74'; Messi (yellow card) 80', (goal) 87'	Report	Gámez (yellow card) 21'; Mandžukić (yellow card) 33', (goal) 57' (pen.); Juanfran (yellow card) 49'; Tiago (yellow card) 65'; Griezmann (yellow card) 69'; Godín (yellow card) 83'	Stadium: Camp Nou; Attendance: 81,658; Referee: Alberto Undiano Mallenco (Navarre)

18 January 2015 19	Deportivo La Coruña	0–4	Barcelona	A Coruña
19:00 CET (UTC+01:00)	Riera (yellow card) 59'; Toché (yellow card) 64'	Report	Messi 10', 33', 62'; Bartra (yellow card) 68'; Dani Alves (yellow card) 78'; Sidnei 83' (o.g.)	Stadium: Riazor; Attendance: 25,173; Referee: Juan Martínez Munuera (Valencian Community)

24 January 2015 20	Elche	0–6	Barcelona	Elche
18:00 CET (UTC+01:00)	Cisma (yellow card) 20'; Aarón (yellow card) 27'; Pelegrín (yellow card) 34'; Jonathas (yellow card) 40'; Fajr (yellow card) 41' (yellow-red card) 57'; Lombán (yellow card) 79'	Report	Piqué 36'; Messi 55' (pen.), 88'; Mascherano (yellow card) 62'; Alba (yellow card) 66'; Neymar 69', 72'; Pedro 90+3'	Stadium: Martínez Valero; Attendance: 28,235; Referee: Carlos Clos Gómez (Aragon)

1 February 2015 21	Barcelona	3–2	Villarreal	Barcelona
21:00 CET (UTC+01:00)	Neymar 45'; Rafinha 53', (yellow card) 64'; Messi 55'	Report	Ruiz (yellow card) 18'; Bruno (yellow card) 23'; Cheryshev 30'; J. Dos Santos (yellow card) 41'; Vietto 51'	Stadium: Camp Nou; Attendance: 60,005; Referee: Iñaki Vicandi Garrido (Basque Country)

8 February 2015 22	Athletic Bilbao	2–5	Barcelona	Bilbao
21:00 CET (UTC+01:00)	Balenziaga (yellow card) 40'; Rico 59'; Aduriz 66'; López (yellow card) 69'; Etxeita (red card) 75'; Gurpegui (yellow card) 90+1'	Report	Messi 15'; Suárez 26'; Dani Alves (yellow card) 45'; De Marcos 62' (o.g.); Neymar 64'; Pedro 86'	Stadium: San Mamés; Attendance: 40,000; Referee: Antonio Mateu Lahoz

15 February 2015 23	Barcelona	5–0	Levante	Barcelona
17:00 CET (UTC+01:00)	Neymar 17'; Messi 38', 59', 66' (pen.); Suárez 73'; Busquets (yellow card) 77'	Report	Ramis (yellow card) 64'; Barral (yellow card) 69'	Stadium: Camp Nou; Attendance: 74,963; Referee: Mario Melero López (Andalusia)

21 February 2015 24	Barcelona	0–1	Málaga	Barcelona
16:00 CET (UTC+01:00)	Rafinha (yellow card) 12'; Piqué (yellow card) 79'; Neymar (yellow card) 87'; Alba (yellow card) 90+1'	Report	Juanmi 8'; Weligton (yellow card) 49'; Recio (yellow card) 62'; Duda (yellow card) 90+1'	Stadium: Camp Nou; Attendance: 78,276; Referee: Juan Martínez Munuera (Valencian Community)

28 February 2015 25	Granada	1–3	Barcelona	Granada
16:00 CET (UTC+01:00)	Márquez (yellow card) 3'; Rico 53' (pen.)	Report	Suárez (yellow card) 15', (goal) 48'; Rakitić 25'; Neymar (yellow card) 55'; Mathieu (yellow card) 58'; Messi 70'	Stadium: Nuevo Los Cármenes; Attendance: 18,119; Referee: Santiago Jaime Latre (Aragon)

8 March 2015 26	Barcelona	6–1	Rayo Vallecano	Barcelona
12:00 CET (UTC+01:00)	Suárez 5', 90+1'; Mascherano (yellow card) 29'; Piqué 47'; Messi 56' (pen.), 63', 68'; Alba (yellow card) 57'; Dani Alves (red card) 80'; Adriano (yellow card) 90'	Report	Tito (yellow card) 27' (yellow-red card) 54'; Trashorras (yellow card) 56'; Bueno 81' (pen.); Aquino (yellow card) 84'	Stadium: Camp Nou; Attendance: 87,151; Referee: Jesús Gil Manzano (Community of Madrid)

14 March 2015 27	Eibar	0–2	Barcelona	Eibar
18:00 CET (UTC+01:00)	Ekiza (yellow card) 30'	Report	Messi 31' (pen.), 55'	Stadium: Ipurua; Attendance: 5,439; Referee: Carlos del Cerro Grande (Community of Madrid)

22 March 2015 28	Barcelona	2–1	Real Madrid	Barcelona
21:00 CET (UTC+01:00)	Mathieu 19'; Suárez (yellow card) 28', (goal) 56'; Alba (yellow card) 37'; Mascherano (yellow card) 61'; Iniesta (yellow card) 65'; Dani Alves (yellow card) 71'	Report	Pepe (yellow card) 21'; Ronaldo 31', (yellow card) 37'; Ramos (yellow card) 45'; Carvajal (yellow card) 48'; Modrić (yellow card) 52'; Isco (yellow card) 64'	Stadium: Camp Nou; Attendance: 98,760; Referee: Antonio Mateu Lahoz (Valencian Community)

5 April 2015 29	Celta Vigo	0–1	Barcelona	Vigo
21:00 CEST (UTC+02:00)	Krohn-Dehli (yellow card) 24'; Orellana (red card) 88'; Nolito (yellow card) 90'	Report	Suárez (yellow card) 45'; Mathieu 73'; Busquets (yellow card) 88'	Stadium: Balaídos; Attendance: 23,731; Referee: Iñaki Vicandi Garrido (Basque Country)

8 April 2015 30	Barcelona	4–0	Almería	Barcelona
20:00 CEST (UTC+02:00)	Messi 33'; Mascherano (yellow card) 43'; Suárez 55', 90+3'; Bartra 75'	Report	Casado (yellow card) 87'	Stadium: Camp Nou; Attendance: 73,837; Referee: Alejandro José Hernández Hernández (Canary Islands)

11 April 2015 31	Sevilla	2–2	Barcelona	Sevilla
20:00 CEST (UTC+02:00)	Krychowiak (yellow card) 29'; Banega 38', (yellow card) 57'; Iborra (yellow card) 46'; Reyes (yellow card) 78'; Mbia (yellow card) 82'; Gameiro 84'	Report	Messi 14'; Neymar 31'; Busquets (yellow card) 61'; Piqué (yellow card) 62'	Stadium: Ramón Sánchez Pizjuán; Attendance: 40,355; Referee: Juan Martínez Munuera (Valencian Community)

18 April 2015 32	Barcelona	2–0	Valencia	Barcelona
16:00 CEST (UTC+02:00)	Suárez 1'; Adriano (yellow card) 27'; Mascherano (yellow card) 54'; Rakitić (yellow card) 77'; Bravo (yellow card) 90+1'; Messi 90+4'	Report	Parejo (penalty missed) 10'; Fuego (yellow card) 28'; Orbán (yellow card) 35'; Otamendi (yellow card) 66'; Mustafi (yellow card) 79'	Stadium: Camp Nou; Attendance: 92,915; Referee: José Luis González González (Castile and León)

25 April 2015 33	Espanyol	0–2	Barcelona	Cornellà de Llobregat
16:00 CEST (UTC+02:00)	S. García (yellow card) 22'; Arbilla (yellow card) 62'; Vásquez (yellow card) 72'; Cañas (yellow card) 80'; Moreno (yellow card) 90+1' (yellow-red card) 90+1'	Report	Neymar 17'; Messi 25'; Alba (yellow card) 54' (yellow-red card) 54'; Dani Alves (yellow card) 58'; Busquets (yellow card) 83'	Stadium: Cornellà-El Prat; Attendance: 30,253; Referee: Antonio Mateu Lahoz (Valencian Community)

28 April 2015 34	Barcelona	6–0	Getafe	Barcelona
20:00 CEST (UTC+02:00)	Messi 9' (pen.), 47'; Suárez 25', 40'; Neymar 28'; Xavi 30'	Report		Stadium: Camp Nou; Attendance: 65,356; Referee: David Fernández Borbalán (Andalusia)

2 May 2015 35	Córdoba	0–8	Barcelona	Córdoba
16:00 CEST (UTC+02:00)	Luso (yellow card) 52'	Report	Rakitić 42'; Suárez 45+2', 53', 88'; Messi 46', 80'; Piqué 65'; Neymar 85' (pen.)	Stadium: Nuevo Arcángel; Attendance: 13,775; Referee: Carlos Clos Gómez (Aragon)

9 May 2015 36	Barcelona	2–0	Real Sociedad	Barcelona
18:00 CEST (UTC+02:00)	Neymar 51'; Mascherano (yellow card) 63'; Pedro 85'	Report	Granero (yellow card) 26'; De la Bella (yellow card) 27'; Bergara (yellow card) 29'; Rulli (yellow card) 62'; Pardo (yellow card) 76'	Stadium: Camp Nou; Attendance: 86,047; Referee: Ignacio Iglesias Villanueva (Galicia)

17 May 2015 37	Atlético Madrid	0–1	Barcelona	Madrid
19:00 CEST (UTC+02:00)	Godín (yellow card) 32'; Koke (yellow card) 53'; Gabi (yellow card) 75'; Giménez (yellow card) 89'; Siqueira (yellow card) 90+4'	Report	Pedro (yellow card) 29'; Messi 65', (yellow card) 90+4'; Neymar (yellow card) 90+2'	Stadium: Vicente Calderón; Attendance: 53,254; Referee: Alberto Undiano Mallenco (Navarre)

23 May 2015 38	Barcelona	2–2	Deportivo La Coruña	Barcelona
18:30 CEST (UTC+02:00)	Messi 5', 59'; Mathieu (yellow card) 75'	Report	Domínguez (yellow card) 58'; Lucas 67'; Salomão 76'; Bergantiños (yellow card) 90'; Medunjanin (yellow card) 90'	Stadium: Camp Nou; Attendance: 93,743; Referee: Carlos Clos Gómez (Aragon)

=== Score overview ===
Win Draw Loss

Opposition	Home score	Away score	Aggregate score
Almería	4–0	2–1	6–1
Athletic Bilbao	2–0	5–2	7–2
Atlético Madrid	3–1	1–0	4–1
Celta Vigo	0–1	1–0	1–1
Córdoba	5–0	8–0	13–0
Deportivo La Coruña	2–2	4–0	6–2
Eibar	3–0	2–0	5–0
Elche	3–0	6–0	9–0
Espanyol	5–1	2–0	7–1
Getafe	6–0	0–0	6–0
Granada	6–0	3–1	9–1
Levante	5–0	5–0	10–0
Málaga	0–1	0–0	0–1
Rayo Vallecano	6–1	2–0	8–1
Real Madrid	2–1	1–3	3–4
Real Sociedad	2–0	0–1	2–1
Sevilla	5–1	2–2	7–3
Valencia	2–0	1–0	3–0
Villarreal	3–2	1–0	4–2

=== Copa del Rey ===
==== Round of 32 ====
3 December 2014 First leg	Huesca	0–4	Barcelona	Huesca
22:00 CET (UTC+01:00)	Carlos David (yellow card) 16'	Report	Rakitić 12'; Iniesta 16'; Mathieu (yellow card) 17'; Pedro 39'; Rafinha 72'	Stadium: Estadio El Alcoraz; Attendance: 10,000; Referee: Carlos del Cerro Grande (Community of Madrid)

16 December 2014 Second leg	Barcelona	8–1 (12–1 agg.)	Huesca	Barcelona
22:00 CET (UTC+01:00)	Pedro 20', 26', 43'; Roberto 29'; Iniesta 40'; Adriano 68'; Traoré 78'; Sandro 83'	Report	Carlos David 86'	Stadium: Camp Nou; Attendance: 44,884; Referee: Eduardo Prieto Iglesias (Navarre)

==== Round of 16 ====
8 January 2015 First leg	Barcelona	5–0	Elche	Barcelona
22:00 CET (UTC+01:00)	Neymar 35', 60'; Suárez 40'; Messi 46' (pen.); Alba 56'	Report	Suárez (yellow card) 42'; Roco (yellow card) 45'; Coro (yellow card) 58'; Pelegrín (yellow card) 77'	Stadium: Camp Nou; Attendance: 27,099; Referee: David Fernández Borbalán (Andalusia)

15 January 2015 Second leg	Elche	0–4 (0–9 agg.)	Barcelona	Elche
22:00 CET (UTC+01:00)	Albácar (yellow card) 18'; Peral (yellow card) 29'	Report	Mathieu 21'; Roberto 40'; Pedro 43' (pen.); Adriano (yellow card) 63', (goal) 90+2'	Stadium: Martínez Valero; Attendance: 13,446; Referee: Santiago Jaime Latre (Aragon)

==== Quarter-finals ====
21 January 2015 First leg	Barcelona	1–0	Atlético Madrid	Barcelona
22:00 CET (UTC+01:00)	Suárez (yellow card) 79'; Mascherano (yellow card) 81'; Messi (penalty missed) 85', 85'	Report	Juanfran (yellow card) 45'; Miranda (yellow card) 83'; Gabi (yellow card) 84'; Godín (yellow card) 90+1'	Stadium: Camp Nou; Attendance: 62,225; Referee: José Luis González González (Castile and León)

28 January 2015 Second leg	Atlético Madrid	2–3 (2–4 agg.)	Barcelona	Madrid
21:00 CET (UTC+01:00)	Torres 1'; García (yellow card) 14', (goal) 30' (pen.); Gabi (yellow card) 41' (red card) 45+1'; Turan (yellow card) 48'; Suárez (yellow card) 69' (yellow-red card) 84'; Siqueira (yellow card) 75'; Giménez (yellow card) 83'; Cani (yellow card) 86'	Report	Neymar 9', 41'; Mascherano (yellow card) 29'; Miranda 38' (o.g.); Messi (yellow card) 44'; Dani Alves (yellow card) 74'	Stadium: Vicente Calderón; Attendance: 54,851; Referee: Jesús Gil Manzano (Extremadura)

==== Semi-finals ====
11 February 2015 First leg	Barcelona	3–1	Villarreal	Barcelona
20:00 CET (UTC+01:00)	Messi 41'; Iniesta 49'; Piqué 64'; Neymar (penalty missed) 71'; Suárez (yellow card) 86'	Report	Trigueros 48'; Pina (yellow card) 66'; Ruiz (yellow card) 70'; Musacchio (yellow card) 70'	Stadium: Camp Nou; Attendance: 57,738; Referee: Alejandro José Hernández Hernández (Canary Islands)

4 March 2015 Second leg	Villarreal	1–3 (2–6 agg.)	Barcelona	Villarreal
20:00 CET (UTC+01:00)	J. Dos Santos (yellow card) 36', (goal) 39'; Cheryshev (yellow card) 38'; Pina (red card) 65'; Campbell (yellow card) 82'	Report	Neymar 3', 88'; Piqué (yellow card) 50'; Suárez 73'	Stadium: El Madrigal; Attendance: 23,600; Referee: David Fernández Borbalán (Andalusia)

==== Final ====
30 May 2015 Final	Athletic Bilbao	1–3	Barcelona	Barcelona
21:30 CEST (UTC+02:00)	Iraola (yellow card) 43'; Balenziaga (yellow card) 58'; Williams (yellow card) 67', (goal) 79'; Iturraspe (yellow card) 87'	Report	Messi 20', 74'; Neymar 36', (yellow card) 88'; Piqué (yellow card) 42'; Busquets (yellow card) 90'	Stadium: Camp Nou; Attendance: 99,354; Referee: Velasco Carballo (Community of Madrid)

=== UEFA Champions League ===
==== Group stage ====
Pos	Team	Pld	W	D	L	GF	GA	GD	Pts	Qualification	BAR	PAR	AJX	APO
1	(Spain) Barcelona	6	5	0	1	15	5	+10	15	Advance to knockout phase	—	3–1	3–1	1–0
2	(France) Paris Saint-Germain	6	4	1	1	10	7	+3	13	Advance to knockout phase	3–2	—	3–1	1–0
3	(Netherlands) Ajax	6	1	2	3	8	10	−2	5	Transfer to Europa League	0–2	1–1	—	4–0
4	(Cyprus) APOEL	6	0	1	5	1	12	−11	1		0–4	0–1	1–1	—

Source: UEFA
Rules for classification: Group stage tiebreakers

Round	1	2	3	4	5	6
Ground	H	A	H	A	A	H
Result	W	L	W	W	W	W
Position	1	2	2	2	2	1

Updated to match(es) played on 10 Dec 2014. Source: Competitive matches
A = Away; H = Home; W = Win; D = Draw; L = Loss

17 September 2014 1	Barcelona (Spain)	1–0	(Cyprus) APOEL	Barcelona, Spain
20:45 CEST (UTC+02:00)	Piqué 28'	UEFA Report; Club Report	Vinícius (yellow card) 11'; Antoniades (yellow card) 27'	Stadium: Camp Nou; Attendance: 62,832; Referee: Deniz Aytekin (Germany)

30 September 2014 2	Paris Saint-Germain (France)	3–2	(Spain) Barcelona	Paris, France
20:45 CEST (UTC+02:00)	David Luiz 10'; Verratti 26', (yellow card) 28'; Matuidi (yellow card) 44', (goal) 54'; Van der Wiel (yellow card) 66'	UEFA Report; Club Report	Messi 12'; Neymar 56'; Dani Alves (yellow card) 83'	Stadium: Parc des Princes; Attendance: 46,400; Referee: Nicola Rizzoli (Italy)

21 October 2014 3	Barcelona (Spain)	3–1	(Netherlands) Ajax	Barcelona, Spain
20:45 CEST (UTC+02:00)	Neymar 7'; Messi 24'; Pedro (yellow card) 80'; Sandro 90+4'	UEFA Report; Club Report	Veltman (yellow card) 32'; Van Rhijn (yellow card) 69'; El Ghazi 88'; Riedewald (yellow card) 90'	Stadium: Camp Nou; Attendance: 79,357; Referee: William Collum (Scotland)

5 November 2014 4	Ajax (Netherlands)	0–2	(Spain) Barcelona	Amsterdam, Netherlands
20:45 CET (UTC+01:00)	El Ghazi (yellow card) 9'; Veltman (yellow card) 34' (yellow-red card) 71'; Moisander (yellow card) 40'	UEFA Report; Club Report	Mascherano (yellow card) 8'; Messi 36', 76'; Alba (yellow card) 42'; Dani Alves (yellow card) 45'	Stadium: Amsterdam Arena; Attendance: 52,117; Referee: Pedro Proença (Portugal)

25 November 2014 5	APOEL (Cyprus)	0–4	(Spain) Barcelona	Nicosia, Cyprus
20:45 CET (UTC+01:00)	Carlão (yellow card) 31'; João Guilherme (yellow card) 54' (yellow-red card) 84'	UEFA Report; Club Report	Suárez 27'; Dani Alves (yellow card) 33'; Rafinha (yellow card) 35' (yellow-red card) 70'; Messi 38', 58', 87'	Stadium: GSP Stadium; Attendance: 20,626; Referee: Gianluca Rocchi (Italy)

10 December 2014 6	Barcelona (Spain)	3–1	(France) Paris Saint-Germain	Barcelona, Spain
20:45 CET (UTC+01:00)	Messi 19'; Neymar 42'; Suárez 77'	UEFA Report; Club Report	Ibrahimović 15'; Cavani (yellow card) 57'	Stadium: Camp Nou; Attendance: 82,570; Referee: Martin Atkinson (England)

==== Knockout phase ====
===== Round of 16 =====
24 February 2015 First leg	Manchester City (England)	1–2	(Spain) Barcelona	Manchester, England
20:45 CET (UTC+01:00)	Clichy (yellow card) 59' (yellow-red card) 74'; Agüero 69'; Fernando (yellow card) 90'	UEFA Report; Club Report	Suárez 16', 30'; Rakitić (yellow card) 41'; Dani Alves (yellow card) 45'; Adriano (yellow card) 88'; Messi (penalty missed) 90+4'	Stadium: Etihad Stadium; Attendance: 47,726; Referee: Felix Brych (Germany)

18 March 2015 Second leg	Barcelona (Spain)	1–0 (3–1 agg.)	(England) Manchester City	Barcelona, Spain
20:45 CET (UTC+01:00)	Rakitić 31'; Dani Alves (yellow card) 80'	UEFA Report; Club Report	Fernandinho (yellow card) 15'; Kolarov (yellow card) 20'; Silva (yellow card) 27'; Nasri (yellow card) 36'; Agüero (penalty missed) 78'; Demichelis (yellow card) 82'	Stadium: Camp Nou; Attendance: 92,551; Referee: Gianluca Rocchi (Italy)

===== Quarter-finals =====
15 April 2015 First leg	Paris Saint-Germain (France)	1–3	(Spain) Barcelona	Paris, France
20:45 CEST (UTC+02:00)	Cabaye (yellow card) 37'; Mathieu 82' (o.g.)	UEFA Report; Club Report	Neymar 18'; Piqué (yellow card) 32'; Messi (yellow card) 54'; Suárez 67', 79'	Stadium: Parc des Princes; Attendance: 45,893; Referee: Mark Clattenburg (England)

21 April 2015 Second leg	Barcelona (Spain)	2–0 (5–1 agg.)	(France) Paris Saint-Germain	Barcelona, Spain
20:45 CEST (UTC+02:00)	Neymar 14', 34'	UEFA Report; Club Report	David Luiz (yellow card) 3'	Stadium: Camp Nou; Attendance: 84,477; Referee: Svein Oddvar Moen (Norway)

===== Semi-finals =====
6 May 2015 First leg	Barcelona (Spain)	3–0	(Germany) Bayern Munich	Barcelona, Spain
20:45 CEST (UTC+02:00)	Dani Alves (yellow card) 46'; Piqué (yellow card) 66'; Neymar (yellow card) 69', (goal) 90+4'; Messi 77', 80'	UEFA Report; Club Report	Alonso (yellow card) 35'; Benatia (yellow card) 52'; Bernat (yellow card) 56'	Stadium: Camp Nou; Attendance: 95,639; Referee: Nicola Rizzoli (Italy)

12 May 2015 Second leg	Bayern Munich (Germany)	3–2 (3–5 agg.)	(Spain) Barcelona	Munich, Germany
20:45 CEST (UTC+02:00)	Benatia 7'; Rafinha (yellow card) 40'; Thiago (yellow card) 45+2'; Lewandowski 59', (yellow card) 76'; Müller 74'; Alonso (yellow card) 81'; Rode (yellow card) 84'	UEFA Report; Club Report	Neymar 15', 29'; Rakitić (yellow card) 64'; Pedro (yellow card) 85'	Stadium: Allianz Arena; Attendance: 70,000; Referee: Mark Clattenburg (England)

===== Final =====
6 June 2015 Final	Juventus (Italy)	1–3	(Spain) Barcelona	Berlin, Germany
20:45 CEST (UTC+02:00)	Vidal (yellow card) 11'; Pogba (yellow card) 41'; Morata 55'	UEFA Report; Club Report	Rakitić 4'; Suárez 68', (yellow card) 70'; Neymar 90+7'	Stadium: Olympiastadion; Attendance: 70,442; Referee: Cüneyt Çakir (Turkey)

=== 2014 Supercopa de Catalunya ===
29 October 2014 Final	Barcelona	1–1 (4–2 p)	Espanyol	Girona
21:30	Piqué 15'	Report	Arbilla 50'	Stadium: Montilivi; Attendance: 5,110; Referee: Alfonso Álvarez Izquierdo (Catalonia)
	Penalties
	Xavi (penalty scored) Sandro (penalty missed) Grimaldo (penalty scored) Halilović (penalty scored) Rakitić (penalty scored)		(penalty scored) Sánchez (penalty missed) Arbilla (penalty missed) Abraham (penalty scored) Jordán
