= 2016–17 Elche CF season =

Elche
2016–17 season
- President: Juan Serrano
- Head coach: Vicente Parras
- Stadium: Manuel Martínez Valero
- Segunda División: 21st (relegated)
- Copa del Rey: Third round
Home colours	Away colours	Third colours

The 2016–17 season was Elche Club de Fútbol's 94th season in existence and the club's second consecutive season in the second division of Spanish football. In addition to the domestic league, Elche participated in this season's edition of the Copa del Rey.

== Competitions ==
=== Results summary ===
Overall								Home						Away					
Pld	W	D	L	GF	GA	GD	Pts	W	D	L	GF	GA	GD	W	D	L	GF	GA	GD
42	11	10	21	49	63	−14	43	6	7	8	27	33	−6	5	3	13	22	30	−8

Last updated: 10 June 2017.

=== Results by matchday ===
Matchday	1	2	3	4	5	6	7	8	9	10	11	12	13	14	15	16	17	18	19	20	21	22	23	24	25	26	27	28	29	30	31	32	33	34	35	36	37	38	39	40	41	42
Ground	H	A	H	A	H	A	H	A	H	A	H	A	A	H	A	H	A	H	A	H	A	A	H	A	H	A	H	A	H	A	H	A	H	H	A	H	A	H	A	H	A	H
Result	W	L	W	D	L	W	L	L	D	W	D	L	D	W	L	W	L	D	W	L	L	D	W	L	D	W	D	L	D	W	L	L	W	L	L	L	L	L	L	D	L	L
Position	2	8	4	3	9	7	8	12	12	8	7	11	13	9	12	8	12	12	10	12	14	12	12	13	13	11	11	12	12	11	12	14	11	13	15	18	18	20	20	21	21	21

Updated to match(es) played on 10 June 2017. Source:
A = Away; H = Home; W = Win; D = Draw; L = Loss

=== Matches ===
20 August 2016 1	Elche	2–1	Rayo Vallecano	Elche
19:00	Matilla 18', 37' (pen.); Rober (yellow card) 25'; Albácar (yellow card) 45'; Juan Carlos (yellow card) 64'; Pelayo (yellow card) 90+3'	Summary	Ebert 13'; Trashorras (yellow card) 43'	Stadium: Estadio Manuel Martínez Valero; Attendance: 6,759; Referee: Rubén Eiriz

27 August 2016 Match 2	Girona	3–1	Elche	Girona
19:00	B. García 21'; Pons (yellow card) 35'; Portu 41'; Aday (yellow card) 63'; Longo 75'	Summary	Pelegrín (yellow card) 44'; Rober (yellow card) 56'; Guillermo 90+2'	Stadium: Montilivi; Attendance: 4,203; Referee: Aitor Gorostegui

3 September 2016 3	Elche	3–1	Tenerife	Elche
20:00	Hervías 3'; Rober (yellow card) 23'; Pedro 69' (pen.); Fraile 90+1'	Summary	Ruiz (yellow card) 34'; Cámara (yellow card) 68'; Perdomo 87'	Stadium: Estadio Manuel Martínez Valero; Attendance: 7,171; Referee: Jorge Valdés

11 September 2016 4	UCAM Murcia	1–1	Elche	Murcia
18:00	Remón (yellow card) 57'; Mejía 70'	Summary	Pérez 10' (o.g.); Pedro (yellow card) 27'	Stadium: Estadio de La Condomina; Attendance: 4,893; Referee: Oliver de la Fuente

17 September 2016 5	Elche	0–3	Lugo	Elche
18:00	Matilla (yellow card) 37'	Summary	Pelegrín 17' (o.g.); Hernández (yellow card) 31'; Campillo 35'; Martínez 80'; Calavera (yellow card) 84'	Stadium: Estadio Manuel Martínez Valero; Attendance: 7,765; Referee: Javier Alberola Rojas

21 September 2016 6	Huesca	0–3	Elche	Huesca
20:00	Amador (yellow card) 47'; Lázaro (yellow card) 67'	Summary	Hervías 74'; Noblejas 80'; Nino 87'	Stadium: Estadio El Alcoraz; Attendance: 2,410; Referee: David Medié Jiménez

24 September 2016 7	Elche	0–1	Levante	Elche
20:00	Pelegrín (yellow card) 46'	Summary	Roger (yellow card) 27'; Campaña (yellow card) 38', (goal) 48'; Raúl (yellow card) 78'; Lerma (yellow card) 86'	Stadium: Estadio Manuel Martínez Valero; Attendance: 7,982; Referee: Guillermo Cuadra Fernández

1 October 2016 8	Alcorcón	1–0	Elche	Alcorcón
18:00	Rodríguez (yellow card) 22', (goal) 51'; Aguza (yellow card) 60'; Dmitrović (yellow card) 89'; Alejo (yellow card) 90+4'	Summary	Rober (yellow card) 67'; Álex (yellow card) 90+4'	Stadium: Estadio Municipal de Santo Domingo; Attendance: 2,864; Referee: Isidro Díaz de Mera

8 October 2016 9	Elche	4–4	Gimnàstic de Tarragona	Elche
18:00	Nino 15', 19', (yellow card) 84'; José Ángel (yellow card) 40'; Matilla 62', (yellow card) 64' (yellow-red card) 85'; Pedro (yellow card) 66'; Dorca 79'; Josete (yellow card) 90+1'	Summary	López 12', 70'; Bouzón (yellow card) 21' (yellow-red card) 90+3'; Mossa (yellow card) 61'; Zahibo (yellow card) 61'; Tejera 67' (pen.); Assoubre 75', (yellow card) 90+2'; Saja (yellow card) 77'	Stadium: Estadio Manuel Martínez Valero; Attendance: 6,907; Referee: Pablo González Fuertes

16 October 2016 10	Real Zaragoza	1–3	Elche	Zaragoza
12:00	Ángel 64'; Cabrera (yellow card) 83'	Summary	Pelayo 29', 44'; Nino 34'; Rober (yellow card) 74'; Albácar (yellow card) 78'; Pedro (yellow card) 87'	Stadium: La Romareda; Attendance: 16,066; Referee: (Spain) Adrián Cordero

22 October 2016 11	Elche	1–1	Córdoba	Elche
16:00	José Ángel (yellow card) 21'; Albácar (yellow card) 29'; Pelegrín 40'	Summary	Luso (yellow card) 2'; Samu (yellow card) 56'; Piovaccari 68', (yellow card) 72'; Caro (yellow card) 90+2'	Stadium: Estadio Manuel Martínez Valero; Attendance: 7,053; Referee: Francisco Arias

30 October 2016 12	Sevilla Atlético	2–0	Elche	Seville
12:00	Ivi (yellow card) 43', (goal) 56'; Curro 51'; Churripi (yellow card) 83'	Report	Álex (yellow card) 29'; Dorca (yellow card) 37'	Stadium: Ramón Sánchez Pizjuán Stadium; Attendance: 11,815; Referee: Víctor Areces

6 November 2016 13	Numancia	2–2	Elche	Soria
16:00	Valcarce 5', 11'; Ruiz de Galarreta (yellow card) 65'	Report	Hervías (yellow card) 10'; Matilla (yellow card) 42'; Pedro (yellow card) 44'; Nino 47', (yellow card) 62'; José Ángel 56', (yellow card) 58'; Dorca (yellow card) 74'	Stadium: Nuevo Estadio Los Pajaritos; Attendance: 2,386; Referee: Javier Alberola Rojas
