= 2013–14 Elche CF season =

Elche CF
2013–14 season
- Chairman: José Sepulcre
- Manager: Fran Escribá
- Stadium: Martínez Valero
- Primera División: 16th
- Copa del Rey: Round of 32
Home colours	Away colours	Third colours

The 2013–14 season was the 91st season in Elche’s history and the 20th in the top-tier.

== Squad ==
As June, 2014..

=== Squad and statistics ===
No.	Pos	Nat	Player	Total		Liga		Copa	
No.	Pos	Nat	Player	Apps	Goals	Apps	Goals	Apps	Goals
1	GK	(Spain) ESP	Manu Herrera	30	0	30	0	0	0
2	DF	(Uruguay) URU	Damián Suárez	32	1	31	1	1	0
3	DF	(Spain) ESP	Alberto Botía	35	0	33	0	2	0
4	DF	(Spain) ESP	David Lombán	28	1	28	1	0	0
5	MF	(Spain) ESP	Alberto Rivera	15	0	13	0	2	0
6	MF	(Spain) ESP	Rubén Pérez	32	0	31	0	1	0
7	MF	(Spain) ESP	Aarón Ñíguez	23	1	22	1	1	0
8	MF	(Spain) ESP	Sergio Mantecón	13	0	12	0	1	0
9	FW	(Ghana) GHA	Richmond Boakye	33	7	31	6	2	1
10	MF	(Spain) ESP	Javi Flores	2	0	1	0	1	0
11	FW	(Spain) ESP	Ferran Corominas "Coro"	38	6	36	6	2	0
13	GK	(Spain) ESP	Antonio Rodríguez "Toño"	11	0	9	0	2	0
14	FW	(Spain) ESP	Manu del Moral	24	2	24	2	0	0
15	MF	(Spain) ESP	Carles Gil	35	1	33	1	2	0
16	MF	(Spain) ESP	Fidel Chaves	36	2	35	2	1	0
17	MF	(Spain) ESP	Javi Márquez	30	2	29	2	1	0
18	DF	(Spain) ESP	Sergio Pelegrín	20	1	18	0	2	1
19	DF	(Romania) ROU	Cristian Săpunaru	9	1	8	1	1	0
20	MF	(Spain) ESP	David Generelo	2	0	1	0	1	0
21	DF	(Spain) ESP	Edu Albácar	19	3	18	3	1	0
22	MF	(Bosnia and Herzegovina) BIH	Miroslav Stevanović	3	0	3	0	0	0
23	DF	(Spain) ESP	Domingo Cisma	21	0	19	0	2	0
24	MF	(Colombia) COL	Carlos Sánchez	31	0	30	0	1	0
25	MF	(Cape Verde) CPV	Garry Rodrigues	10	1	10	1	0	0
26	DF	(England) ENG	Charlie I'Anson	2	0	2	0	0	0
27	FW	(Spain) ESP	Álvaro Giménez	2	0	2	0	0	0
28	FW	(Spain) ESP	Cristian Herrera	22	3	21	3	1	0
30	MF	(Spain) ESP	Samu Martínez	1	0	1	0	0	0

== Competitions ==
=== Overall ===
Competition	Started round	Final position / round	First match	Last match
La Liga	—	16th	19 August 2013	18 May 2014
Copa del Rey	Round of 32	Round of 32	6 December 2013	17 December 2013

Updated to match played June 2014
Source: Competitions
