= Manu Herrera =

Spanish footballer (born 1981)

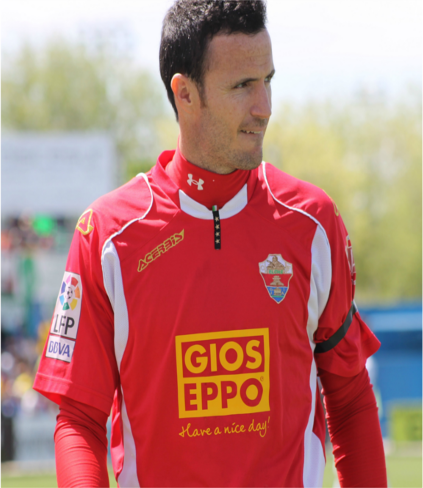
- Herrera in 2012

Personal information
- Full name: Manuel Herrera Yagüe
- Date of birth: 29 September 1981 (age 45)
- Place of birth: Madrid, Spain
- Height: 1.82 m (5 ft 11 1/2 in)
- Position: Goalkeeper

Youth career
- 1995–2000: Real Madrid

Senior career*
Years	Team	Apps	(Gls)
2000–2001	Real Madrid C	18	(0)
2001–2002	Real Madrid B	0	(0)
2002–2003	Casetas		
2003–2004	Palamós	31	(0)
2004–2007	Levante B	80	(0)
2007–2010	Levante	24	(0)
2007–2008	→ Eibar (loan)	4	(0)
2010–2012	Alcorcón	76	(0)
2012–2015	Elche	76	(0)
2015–2016	Zaragoza	23	(0)
2016–2017	Betis	0	(0)
2017–2018	Osasuna	4	(0)
2019–2020	Atlético Baleares	20	(0)
2020–2024	Intercity	97	(0)
Total		453	(0)
- * Club domestic league appearances and goals

Manuel Herrera Yagüe (born 29 September 1981) is a Spanish former professional footballer who played as a goalkeeper.

== Club career ==
Born in Madrid, Herrera joined Real Madrid's youth setup in 1995, aged 13, and made his senior debut with the C team in 2000–01, in Tercera División. He was promoted to the reserves in the Segunda División B the following year, but failed to make an appearance during the season.

After a brief period with amateurs UD Casetas, Herrera joined Palamós CF in the third division. In June 2004 he moved to Atlético Levante UD in the same league, and served as third choice for the main squad in 2006–07 behind José Francisco Molina and Pablo Cavallero.

On 8 August 2007, Herrera was loaned to Segunda División club SD Eibar. His first game as a professional occurred on 10 October, in a 2–1 away loss against Elche CF in the third round of the Copa del Rey. His maiden appearance in the league came late in the same month, a 2–2 home draw with UD Salamanca.

In summer 2008, Herrera returned to the Valencian side, now in division two. Initially a backup to Manolo Reina, he enjoyed a run in the starting XI from November 2009 until March of the following year, and also achieved promotion.

Herrera joined AD Alcorcón also of the second tier on 23 July 2010. After two years as a starter (playing all league matches in the second), he moved to Elche in June 2012.

Herrera won the Ricardo Zamora Trophy in his debut season with the Franjiverdes, who won the league and returned to La Liga after 24 years. On 19 August 2013, one month shy of his 32nd birthday, he made his debut in the competition, starting in a 3–0 away defeat to Rayo Vallecano.

On 13 July 2015, Herrera signed a two-year deal with Real Zaragoza after his contract with Elche expired. On 1 August of the following year he cut ties with the former team, and joined Real Betis the following day.

On 3 August 2017, Herrera agreed to a one-year contract at CA Osasuna. In January 2019, after six competitive appearances at the El Sadar Stadium, the free agent returned to the lower leagues with CD Atlético Baleares.

== Career statistics ==
Appearances and goals by club, season and competition
Club	Season	League			National cup		Other		Total	
Club	Season	Division	Apps	Goals	Apps	Goals	Apps	Goals	Apps	Goals
Palamós	2003–04	Segunda División B	31	0	—		—		31	0
Levante B	2004–05	Segunda División B	35	0	—		—		35	0
Levante B	2005–06	Segunda División B	24	0	—		1	0	25	0
Levante B	2006–07	Segunda División B	21	0	—		—		21	0
Levante B	Total		80	0	—		1	0	81	0
Levante	2005–06	Segunda División	0	0	0	0	—		0	0
Levante	2008–09	Segunda División	4	0	0	0	—		4	0
Levante	2009–10	Segunda División	20	0	1	0	—		21	0
Levante	Total		24	0	1	0	—		24	0
Eibar (loan)	2007–08	Segunda División	4	0	1	0	—		5	0
Alcorcón	2010–11	Segunda División	34	0	0	0	—		34	0
Alcorcón	2011–12	Segunda División	42	0	0	0	4	0	46	0
Alcorcón	Total		76	0	0	0	4	0	80	0
Elche	2012–13	Segunda División	39	0	0	0	—		39	0
Elche	2013–14	La Liga	30	0	0	0	—		30	0
Elche	2014–15	La Liga	7	0	1	0	—		8	0
Elche	Total		76	0	1	0	—		77	0
Zaragoza	2015–16	Segunda División	23	0	1	0	—		24	0
Betis	2016–17	La Liga	0	0	0	0	—		0	0
Osasuna	2017–18	Segunda División	4	0	2	0	—		6	0
Atlético Baleares	2018–19	Segunda División B	1	0	—		0	0	1	0
Atlético Baleares	2019–20	Segunda División B	19	0	0	0	2	0	21	0
Atlético Baleares	Total		20	0	0	0	2	0	22	0
Intercity	2020–21	Tercera División	24	0	—		3	0	27	0
Intercity	2021–22	Segunda División RFEF	33	0	—		—		33	0
Intercity	2022–23	Primera Federación	28	0	0	0	—		28	0
Intercity	2023–24	Primera Federación	12	0	—		—		12	0
Intercity	Total		97	0	0	0	3	0	100	0
Career total			435	0	5	0	10	0	450	0

== Honours ==
Elche

- Segunda División: 2012–13

Individual

- Ricardo Zamora Trophy: 2012–13
