= List of La Liga clubs =

Spanish football league clubs

The following is a list of clubs who have played in the La Liga since its formation in 1929.

Over that span, 63 teams have taken part in 95 La Liga championships, played from the 1929 season until the 2025–26 season. Athletic Bilbao, Barcelona and Real Madrid are the only teams that have played in every season.

== All-time table ==
The all-time La Liga table is an overall record of all match results, points, and goals of every team that has played in La Liga since its inception in 1929. Teams in bold are part of the 2026–27 La Liga season.

As of 2026–27 season (96 seasons total).

All-time La Liga table
Pos	Club	S	Pts	Pld	W	D	L	GF	GA	GD	Titles	Debut	Since/ Last App	Best
1	**Real Madrid**	96	5,129	3,104	1,873	618	613	6,638	3,449	3,189	36	1929	1929	1st
2	**Barcelona**	96	5,031	3,104	1,818	618	668	6,674	3,432	3,242	29	1929	1929	1st
3	**Atlético Madrid**	90	4,122	2,956	1,441	678	837	5,100	3,605	1,495	11	1929	2002–03	1st
4	**Valencia**	92	3,850	3,006	1,307	720	979	4,830	3,900	930	6	1931–32	1987–88	1st
5	**Athletic Bilbao**	96	3,850	3,104	1,335	737	1,032	5,048	4,077	971	8	1929	1929	1st
6	**Sevilla**	83	3,327	2,750	1,130	619	1,001	4,134	3,798	336	1	1934–35	2001–02	1st
7	**Espanyol**	90	3,086	2,892	1,020	686	1,186	3,877	4,237	−360	–	1929	2024–25	3rd
8	**Real Sociedad**	80	3,075	2,644	1,002	665	977	3,690	3,639	51	2	1929	2010–11	1st
9	**Real Betis**	61	2,399	2,070	746	534	790	2,636	2,938	−302	1	1932–33	2015–16	1st
10	**Celta Vigo**	61	2,208	2,040	693	487	860	2,726	3,111	−385	–	1939–40	2012–13	4th
11	Zaragoza	58	2,109	1,986	698	522	766	2,683	2,847	−164	–	1939–40	2012–13	2nd
12	**Deportivo A Coruña**	47	1,843	1,568	569	403	596	2,090	2,269	−179	1	1941–42	2026–27	1st
13	**Osasuna**	45	1,683	1,582	511	403	668	1,791	2,186	−395	–	1935–36	2019–20	4th
14	Valladolid	47	1,641	1,656	502	437	717	1,922	2,486	−564	–	1948–49	2024–25	4th
15	**Villarreal**	27	1,511	988	418	257	313	1,451	1,223	228	–	1998–99	2013–14	2nd
16	**Racing Santander**	45	1,415	1,426	453	335	638	1,842	2,365	−523	–	1929	2026–27	2nd
17	Mallorca	33	1,400	1,216	398	313	505	1,410	1,687	−277	–	1960–61	2025–26	3rd
18	Sporting Gijón	42	1,389	1,458	471	358	629	1,753	2,152	−399	–	1944–45	2016–17	2nd
19	Oviedo	39	1,203	1,230	414	303	513	1,668	2,011	−343	–	1933–34	2025–26	3rd
20	Las Palmas	36	1,114	1,210	390	267	553	1,444	1,928	−484	–	1951–52	2024–25	2nd
21	**Getafe**	22	976	798	254	214	330	856	998	−142	–	2004–05	2017–18	5th
22	**Rayo Vallecano**	24	925	870	254	216	400	996	1,398	−402	–	1977–78	2021–22	8th
23	Granada	27	828	894	259	213	422	1000	1,408	−408	–	1941–42	2023–24	6th
24	**Málaga CF**	18	791	646	209	164	273	779	898	−119	–	1949–50	2026–27	4th
25	**Alavés**	21	757	684	213	153	318	756	1,059	−303	–	1930–31	2023–24	6th
26	**Elche**	26	752	830	237	224	369	903	1,253	−350	–	1959–60	2025–26	5th
27	**Levante**	18	673	630	177	160	293	724	1,003	−279	–	1963–64	2025–26	6th
28	CD Málaga	20	540	647	186	171	290	666	926	−260	–	1949–50	1989–90	7th
29	Hércules	20	538	628	184	149	295	716	1,050	−334	–	1935–36	2010–11	5th
30	Tenerife	13	510	494	155	128	211	619	744	−125	–	1961–62	2009–10	5th
31	Cádiz	16	499	598	139	178	281	518	877	−359	–	1977–78	2023–24	12th
32	Murcia	18	445	586	145	143	298	607	992	−385	–	1940–41	2007–08	11th
33	Salamanca	12	377	424	124	102	198	425	581	−156	–	1974–75	1998–99	7th
34	Sabadell	14	353	426	129	95	202	492	720	−228	–	1943–44	1987–88	4th
35	Eibar	7	302	266	77	71	118	297	385	−88	–	2014–15	2020–21	9th
36	UD Almería	8	301	304	76	76	152	336	506	−170	–	2007–08	2023–24	8th
37	Girona	6	300	228	81	57	90	313	328	−15	–	2017–18	2025–26	3th
38	Logroñés	9	293	346	96	92	158	291	489	−198	–	1987–88	1996–97	7th
39	Castellón	11	285	334	103	79	152	419	588	−169	–	1941–42	1990–91	4th
40	Albacete	7	257	270	76	76	118	320	410	−90	–	1991–92	2004–05	7th
41	Córdoba	9	230	282	82	63	137	285	430	−145	–	1962–63	2014–15	5th
42	Leganés	5	199	190	48	55	87	176	256	−80	–	2016–17	2024–25	13th
43	Compostela	4	190	160	52	45	63	199	241	−42	–	1994–95	1997–98	10th
44	Recreativo	5	188	186	50	46	90	202	296	−94	–	1978–79	2008–09	8th
45	Burgos CF (1936)	6	168	204	59	50	95	216	310	−94	–	1971–72	1979–80	12th
46	Pontevedra	6	150	180	53	44	83	165	221	−56	–	1963–64	1969–70	7th
47	Numancia	4	148	152	37	37	78	155	253	−98	–	1999–00	2008–09	17th
48	Arenas	7	107	130	43	21	66	227	308	−81	–	1929	1934–35	3rd
49	Real Burgos	3	96	114	26	44	44	101	139	−38	–	1990–91	1992–93	9th
50	Gimnàstic	4	91	116	34	16	66	181	295	−114	–	1947–48	2006–07	7th
51	Extremadura	2	83	80	20	23	37	62	117	−55	–	1996–97	1998–99	17th
52	Mérida	2	81	80	19	24	37	70	115	−45	–	1995–96	1997–98	19th
53	Alcoyano	4	76	108	30	16	62	145	252	−107	–	1945–46	1950–51	10th
54	Jaén	3	71	90	29	13	48	121	183	−62	–	1953–54	1957–58	14th
55	Huesca	2	67	76	14	25	37	77	118	−41	–	2018–19	2020–21	19th
56	Real Unión	4	56	72	21	14	37	153	184	−31	–	1929	1931–32	6th
57	AD Almería	2	52	68	17	18	33	71	116	−45	–	1979–80	1980–81	10th
58	Europa	3	42	54	18	6	30	97	131	−34	–	1929	1930–31	8th
59	Lleida	2	40	68	13	14	41	70	182	−112	–	1950–51	1993–94	16th
60	Xerez	1	34	38	8	10	20	38	66	−28	–	2009–10	2009–10	20th
61	Condal	1	22	30	7	8	15	37	57	−20	–	1956–57	1956–57	16th
62	Atlético Tetuán	1	19	30	7	5	18	51	85	−34	–	1951–52	1951–52	16th
63	Cultural Leonesa	1	14	30	5	4	21	34	65	−31	–	1955–56	1955–56	15th
Notes
Despite finishing the season in the 13th position in the 2014–15 La Liga, on 5 June, Elche was relegated to the Segunda División due to its financial struggles. Newcomers Eibar, who finished the season in the 18th position, took Elche's place in the 2015–16 La Liga.

League or status for 2026–27 season
2026–27 La Liga
2026–27 Segunda División
2026–27 Primera Federación
2026–27 Segunda Federación
Club no longer exists

== Dead clubs and their replacements ==
1) CD Málaga

Although it isn't a direct replacement but Málaga CF used to be a reserve team but when CD Málaga where relegated to the Tercera Federación they would've been relegated to the 5th tier but to avoid this they held a referendum and become an independent club.

2) UD Salamanca

Salamanca actually had 3 replacements instead of just one. They are:

1) Salamanca CF UDS some managers of the former salamanca club decided to refound the farm team to preserve the legacy of the historical club. With that aim, they created this club which currently plays in the Primera Federación

2) Salamanca AC

Was created as a replacement. But did not play any matches. Then the supreme court gave the reason to the Royal Spanish Football Federation to dissoulate this project.

3) Unionistas De Salamanca CF
