= Jesús Tamayo =

Spanish footballer (born 1994)

Personal information
- Full name: Jesús Tamayo Tapia
- Date of birth: 17 July 1994 (age 32)
- Place of birth: Madrid, Spain
- Height: 1.75 m (5 ft 9 in)
- Position: Winger

Team information
- Current team: Toledo

Youth career
- Atlético Metropolitano
- 2012–2013: Alcorcón

Senior career*
Years	Team	Apps	(Gls)
2012–2014	Alcorcón B	40	(15)
2013–2014	Alcorcón	4	(0)
2014–2015	Elche B	9	(0)
2015	→ Alcorcón B (loan)	12	(0)
2015–2017	Alcorcón B	41	(11)
2017–2018	Getafe B	48	(9)
2018–2019	Internacional Madrid	33	(9)
2019–2020	Rayo Majadahonda	12	(2)
2020	Fuenlabrada	0	(0)
2020–2024	Numancia	73	(9)
2024–	Toledo	6	(2)
- * Club domestic league appearances and goals as of 13 October 2024

Jesús Tamayo Tapia (born 17 July 1994) is a Spanish professional footballer who plays mainly as a left winger for Toledo.

== Football career ==
A product of AD Alcorcón's youth system, Tamayo made his senior debuts in the 2012–13 season with the reserves, in the Tercera División. On 27 October 2013 he made his first appearance with the main squad, playing the last 5 minutes of a 0–0 home draw against Girona FC in the Segunda División.

On 13 July 2014 Tamayo rescinded his link with the Madrid outfit and moved to another reserve team, Elche CF Ilicitano. The following 22 January, after appearing sparingly, Tamayo returned to Alcorcón B, on loan until June, and signed permanently for the club on 28 July.

On 21 January 2017, Tamayo joined Getafe CF and was assigned to the B-team also in division four. He subsequently represented Segunda División B sides Internacional de Madrid and CF Rayo Majadahonda, scoring nine goals with the former.

On 24 August 2020, Tamayo agreed to a two-year deal with CF Fuenlabrada in the second division. On 24 September, after being offered to move out on loan, he terminated his contract with the club, and moved to CD Numancia just hours later.
