= Fran Pérez (footballer, born 1986) =

Spanish footballer

Personal information
- Full name: Francisco Pérez Caso
- Date of birth: 3 January 1986 (age 40)
- Place of birth: Santander, Spain
- Height: 1.90 m (6 ft 3 in)
- Position: Centre back

Youth career
- Escobedo

Senior career*
Years	Team	Apps	(Gls)
2005–2007	Escobedo		
2007–2009	Lemona	33	(1)
2009–2011	Barakaldo	50	(6)
2011–2013	Lugo	25	(1)
2013–2014	Cádiz	30	(0)
2014–2018	UCAM Murcia	114	(6)
- * Club domestic league appearances and goals

Francisco "Fran" Pérez Caso (born 3 January 1986) is a Spanish former footballer who played as a central defender.

== Football career ==
Born in Santander, Cantabria, Pérez started his senior career with local amateurs UM Escobedo, in 2005–06. In 2007, he joined SD Lemona in the third division, and two seasons later signed with Barakaldo CF in the same level.

In July 2011, Pérez moved to CD Lugo also from division three. In his first season he contributed with 11 appearances and one goal, with his team being promoted in the playoffs.

Pérez made his debut as a professional on 18 August 2012, playing the full 90 minutes in a 1–0 home win against Hércules CF in the second tier championship. He was released by the Galician club in June 2013, and subsequently moved to Cádiz CF in the third division.

On 18 August 2014, Pérez signed for fellow league team UCAM Murcia CF.
