= Damián Suárez =

Uruguayan footballer (born 1988)

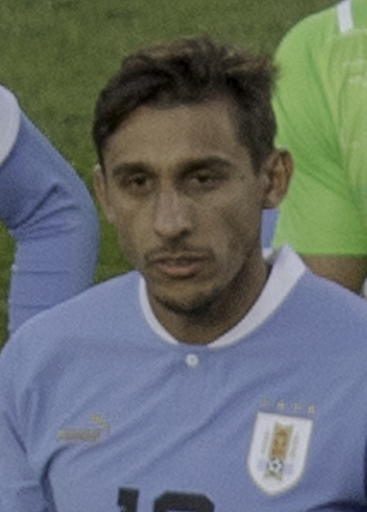
- Suárez with Uruguay in 2022

Personal information
- Full name: Damián Nicolás Suárez Suárez
- Date of birth: 27 April 1988 (age 38)
- Place of birth: Montevideo, Uruguay
- Height: 1.72 m (5 ft 8 in)
- Position: Right-back

Team information
- Current team: Cerro
- Number: 22

Youth career
- 1999–2007: Defensor

Senior career*
Years	Team	Apps	(Gls)
2007–2011	Defensor	67	(2)
2011–2012	Sporting Gijón	19	(0)
2012–2015	Elche	98	(3)
2015–2024	Getafe	277	(4)
2024	Botafogo	22	(0)
2024–2026	Peñarol	19	(0)
2026–	Cerro	22	(1)

International career
2005	Uruguay U17	3	(0)
2007	Uruguay U20	12	(0)
2022	Uruguay	7	(0)
- * Club domestic league appearances and goals as of 20:08, 7 October 2026 (UTC)

Damián Nicolás Suárez Suárez (born 27 April 1988) is a Uruguayan professional footballer who plays as a right-back for Uruguayan Primera División club Cerro.

After starting out at Defensor, he went on to spend the vast majority of his career in Spain, notably making 295 competitive appearances for Getafe.

Suárez made his debut for the Uruguay national team in 2022.

== Club career ==
Born in Montevideo, Suárez spent four seasons at his hometown club Defensor Sporting after joining as an 11-year old, winning the 2008 Uruguayan Primera División. In early June 2011 he moved to La Liga with Sporting de Gijón, signing a three-year deal.

Suárez made his league debut on 11 September 2011, playing the full 90 minutes in a 2–1 away loss against CA Osasuna. In his first season, which ended in relegation, he was mostly used as Alberto Lora's backup.

On 24 July 2012, Suárez terminated his contract with the Asturians and joined Elche CF in the Segunda División. He scored his first goal in Spain on 2 March 2013, his team's first in a 2–1 win at Recreativo de Huelva. He appeared in 33 matches during the campaign, as the Valencians returned to the top division after a 24-year absence.

Suárez scored his first goal in the Spanish top flight on 30 March 2014, through a penalty kick for the first in a 1–1 away draw against Villarreal CF. On 7 July 2015, he signed for Getafe CF in the same league on a three-year deal.

On 20 April 2022, after taking the field in the 2–0 away defeat of RC Celta de Vigo, Suárez became Getafe's player with the most appearances in the top tier at 191. In February 2024, the 35-year-old left by mutual consent.

Suárez agreed to a two-year contract with Campeonato Brasileiro Série A side Botafogo FR on 9 February 2024. On 16 September, however, he returned to Uruguayan football by signing with Peñarol until December 2025.

== International career ==
Suárez represented Uruguay at the 2005 FIFA U-17 World Championship and the 2007 FIFA U-20 World Cup. After several call-ups to the senior team, he made his full debut on 27 January 2022 in a 1–0 win against Paraguay in the 2022 FIFA World Cup qualifiers; this made him the oldest outfield player to achieve this for the country, a record held by Andrés Scotti since 2006.

== Personal life ==
Suárez's younger brother, Mathías, is also a professional footballer.

== Career statistics ==
=== Club ===
As of match played 1 February 2024

Appearances and goals by club, season and competition
Club	Season	League			National cup		Continental		Other		Total	
Club	Season	Division	Apps	Goals	Apps	Goals	Apps	Goals	Apps	Goals	Apps	Goals
Defensor	2007–08	Uruguayan Primera División	15	0	—		0	0	—		15	0
Defensor	2008–09	Uruguayan Primera División	5	0	—		4 (Note: Appearances in Copa Sudamericana)	0	—		9	0
Defensor	2009–10	Uruguayan Primera División	24	1	—		2	0	—		26	1
Defensor	2010–11	Uruguayan Primera División	23	1	—		6	0	1 (Note: Appearance in Uruguayan Primera División championship playoff)	0	31	1
Defensor	Total		67	2	0	0	12	0	1	0	80	2
Sporting Gijón	2011–12	La Liga	19	0	1	0	—		—		20	0
Elche	2012–13	Segunda División	33	1	0	0	—		—		33	1
Elche	2013–14	La Liga	31	1	1	0	—		—		32	1
Elche	2014–15	La Liga	34	1	3	0	—		—		37	1
Elche	Total		98	3	4	0	0	0	0	0	102	3
Getafe	2015–16	La Liga	31	0	2	0	—		—		33	0
Getafe	2016–17	Segunda División	37	0	1	0	—		4 (Note: Appearances in La Liga play-offs)	0	42	0
Getafe	2017–18	La Liga	33	1	0	0	—		—		33	1
Getafe	2018–19	La Liga	36	0	6	0	—		—		42	0
Getafe	2019–20	La Liga	30	1	0	0	4 (Note: Appearances in UEFA Europa League)	0	—		34	1
Getafe	2020–21	La Liga	31	1	0	0	—		—		31	1
Getafe	2021–22	La Liga	35	0	0	0	—		—		35	0
Getafe	2022–23	La Liga	28	1	0	0	—		—		28	1
Getafe	2023–24	La Liga	16	0	1	0	—		—		17	0
Getafe	Total		277	4	9	0	4	0	4	0	295	4
Career total			442	9	14	0	16	0	5	0	497	9

=== International ===
Appearances and goals by national team and year
National team	Year	Apps	Goals
Uruguay	2022	7	0
Total		7	0

== Honours ==
Defensor

- Uruguayan Primera División: 2007–08

Elche

- Segunda División: 2012–13

Peñarol

- Uruguayan Primera División: 2024
- Copa Uruguay: 2025
