= Pelayo Novo =

Spanish footballer (1990–2023)

Pelayo
- Pelayo as an Elche player

Personal information
- Full name: Pelayo Novo García
- Date of birth: 1 November 1990
- Place of birth: Oviedo, Spain
- Date of death: 28 February 2023 (aged 32)
- Place of death: Oviedo, Spain
- Height: 1.85 m (6 ft 1 in)
- Position: Midfielder

Youth career
- 2006–2009: Oviedo

Senior career*
Years	Team	Apps	(Gls)
2007–2009	Oviedo B	6	(3)
2008–2012	Oviedo	94	(14)
2012–2017	Elche	78	(7)
2013–2014	→ Córdoba (loan)	24	(1)
2014–2015	→ Lugo (loan)	14	(4)
2017	CFR Cluj	0	(0)
2017–2018	Albacete	2	(0)
Total		218	(29)
- * Club domestic league appearances and goals

Pelayo Novo García (1 November 1990 – 28 February 2023), known simply as Pelayo, was a Spanish professional footballer who played as a midfielder.

He appeared in 116 Segunda División matches over six seasons, scoring a total of 12 goals for Elche, Córdoba, Lugo and Albacete. He retired in 2018 after being paralysed in a fall, and was involved in wheelchair tennis until his death at age 32.

== Club career ==
Born in Oviedo, Asturias, Pelayo began playing with his hometown side Real Oviedo, spending his first three full seasons as a senior in the Segunda División B. In his last, he scored seven goals in 34 games (2,749 minutes of action) to help the team to finish in sixth position.

On 6 July 2012, Pelayo signed a three-year contract with Elche CF of Segunda División. He made his official debut on 19 August, coming on as a substitute for Carles Gil in the final minutes of the 4–2 home win against SD Ponferradina. On 6 October he scored his first goal in the league, contributing to a 2–1 away victory over CD Mirandés.

Pelayo agreed to a new two-year deal with the Valencian club in July 2013, and was immediately loaned to Córdoba CF. On 29 July 2014, he moved to second-tier CD Lugo until 30 June.

In mid-June 2017, immediately following Elche's relegation, 26-year-old Pelayo moved abroad for the first time in his career, joining Liga I's CFR Cluj. On 28 August, however, he terminated his contract and signed a two-year deal with Albacete Balompié.

On 31 March 2018, Pelayo was rushed to hospital after falling from the third floor of his team’s hotel before their match with SD Huesca, which resulted in permanent paralysis. As a result, he announced his retirement on the eve of his 28th birthday; the severe injuries were reported by some media outlets as the result of a suicide attempt. He had a history of clinical depression and had sought specialised mental health care before the incident in the hotel.

== Personal life and death ==
Pelayo married Iciar López in June 2022. He had a degree in industrial technical engineering, and together with his wife established a dog grooming business in his hometown.

Pelayo died on 28 February 2023 at the age of 32, after being hit by a train in Oviedo's railway station of La Corredoria. He had taken up wheelchair tennis prior to his death, first becoming regional champion in 2021 and later joining the Asturian Tennis Federation's board.

== See also ==
- Francesc Arnau
