= Enzo Roco =

Chilean footballer (born 1992)

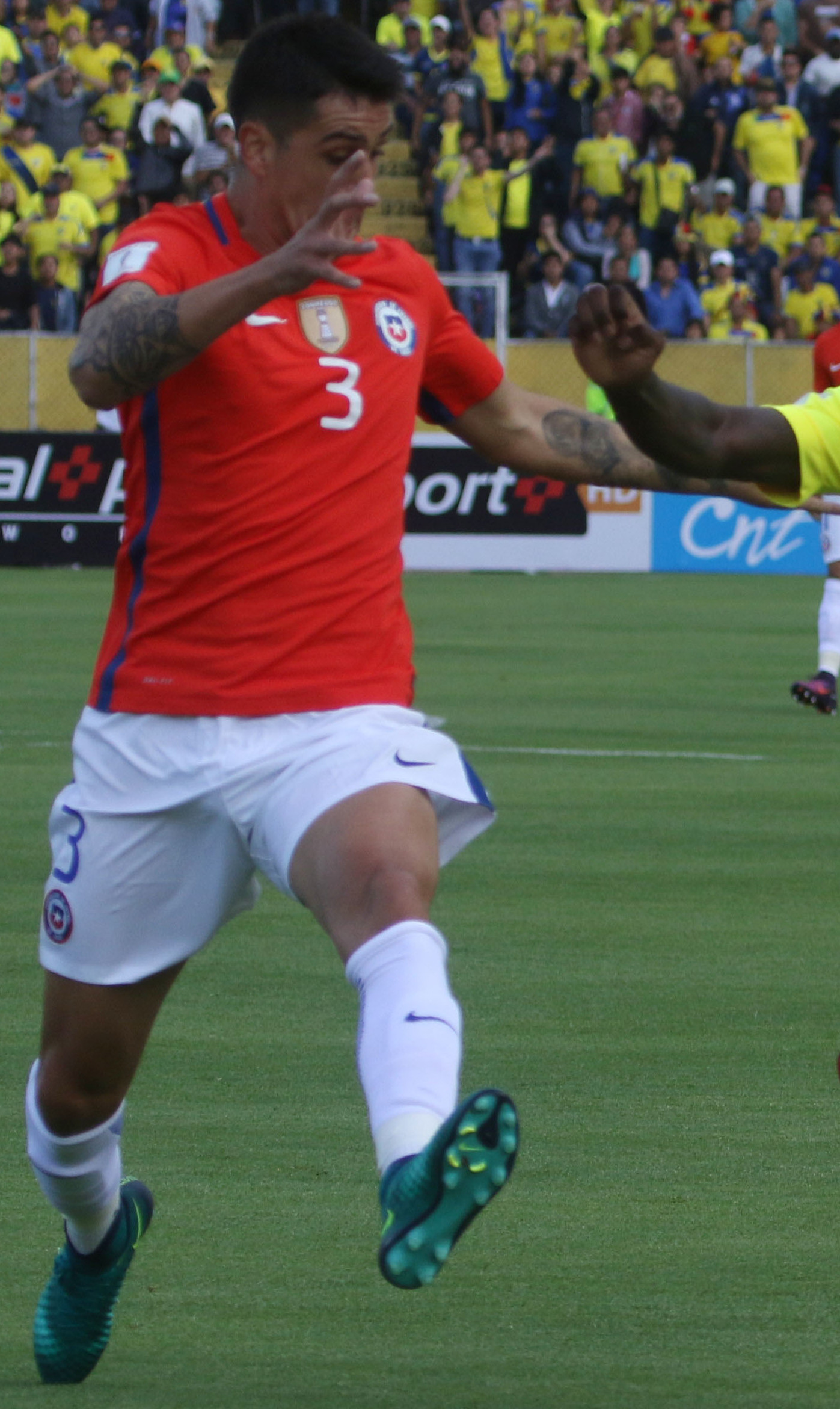
- Roco playing for Chile in 2016

Personal information
- Full name: Enzo Pablo Roco Roco
- Date of birth: 16 August 1992 (age 34)
- Place of birth: Ovalle, Chile
- Height: 1.92 m (6 ft 4 in)
- Position: Centre-back

Team information
- Current team: Palestino
- Number: 3

Youth career
- 2000–2007: Academia Municipal Ovalle
- 2008–2011: Universidad Católica

Senior career*
Years	Team	Apps	(Gls)
2011–2015	Universidad Católica	92	(8)
2014–2015	→ Elche (loan)	32	(1)
2015–2016	O'Higgins	0	(0)
2015–2016	→ Espanyol (loan)	33	(2)
2016–2018	Cruz Azul	51	(3)
2018–2020	Beşiktaş	17	(0)
2020–2021	Fatih Karagümrük	31	(3)
2021–2023	Elche	52	(1)
2023–2024	Al-Tai	30	(1)
2024–2025	Al-Riyadh	0	(0)
2025	Fatih Karagümrük	7	(0)
2026–	Palestino	8	(0)

International career^{‡}
2009	Chile U17	3	(1)
2012–	Chile	32	(1)
Medal record
Men's Football
Representing Chile
Copa América Centenario
Winner	2016 USA
FIFA Confederations Cup
Runner-up	2017 Russia
- * Club domestic league appearances and goals as of 27 July 2026 ‡ National team caps and goals as of 17:42, 6 March 2022 (UTC)

Enzo Pablo Roco Roco (born Enzo Pablo Andía Roco; 16 August 1992) is a Chilean professional footballer who plays as a central defender for Palestino.

== Club career ==
Born in Ovalle, Roco joined Universidad Católica's youth setup in 2008 from the Academia Municipal de Fútbol Ovalle (Municipal Football Academy of Ovalle), aged fifteen. He was definitely promoted to the first-team in 2011, and played his first match as a professional on 8 May 2011, starting and being sent off in a 0–0 home draw against Unión Española.

On 24 September Roco scored his first professional goal, but in a 3–2 loss at Santiago Morning. He established himself as a starter in the following campaigns, being an ever-present figure during the club's Primera División and Copa Chile titles.

On 31 July 2014, Roco joined La Liga side Elche CF on loan with a buyout clause. He made his debut in the competition on 31 August, playing the full 90 minutes in a 1–1 home draw against Granada CF.

On 31 July 2015, Roco moved to fellow league club RCD Espanyol, on loan from O'Higgins for one year with an option to buy.

On 28 June 2016, Eduardo de la Torre announced the arrival of Enzo along with Chilean teammate Francisco Silva. After, the municipal council of Ovalle declared him an Hijo Ilustre ('Honoured son') of the community.

Roco joined Turkish side Beşiktaş on a four-season contract on 27 July 2018. The contract between Beşiktaş and Roco was mutually terminated grounded upon conclusion that Roco to be paid his pending receivables worthing €700,000, on 6 September 2020. On 7 September 2020, another Süper Lig contestant Fatih Karagümrük S.K. announced that Roco joined their team.

On 9 July 2021, it was announced that Roco would rejoin Elche on a two-year deal, coming back after six years to play for former manager Fran Escribá.

On 28 July 2023, Roco signed with Al-Tai in the Saudi Professional League. In September 2024, he switched to Al-Riyadh.

Back to Chile, Roco signed with Palestino on 26 January 2026.

== International career ==
After appearing with the under-17 squad in 2009, Roco made his debut with the main squad on 15 February 2012, starting and playing the full 90 minutes of a 2–0 loss against Paraguay. He scored his first international goal on 22 March, netting his side's second of a 3–1 home win against Peru.

On 13 May 2014, Roco was named in Jorge Sampaoli's 30-man list for 2014 FIFA World Cup, but was one of the seven players cut from the final list.

== Personal life ==
On 8 July 2014 Roco changed his surname Andía to Roco, honoring his mother and grandfather.

== Career statistics ==
=== Club ===
As of match played 23 August 2024

Appearances and goals by club, season and competition
Club	Season	League			National Cup		Continental		Total	
Club	Season	Division	Apps	Goals	Apps	Goals	Apps	Goals	Apps	Goals
Universidad Católica	2010	Chilean Primera División	—		—		0	0	0	0
Universidad Católica	2011	Chilean Primera División	15	2	0	0	5 (Note: Appearance(s) in Copa Sudamericana)	1	20	3
Universidad Católica	2012	Chilean Primera División	26	0	9	0	14 (Note: Nine appearances, 1 goal in Copa Sudamericana, Five appearances, 1 goal in Copa Libertadores)	2	49	2
Universidad Católica	2013	Chilean Primera División	17	2	10	0	5	0	32	2
Universidad Católica	2013–14	Chilean Primera División	33	4	—		—		33	4
Universidad Católica	2014–15	Chilean Primera División	1	0	—		—		1	0
Universidad Católica	Total		92	8	19	0	24	3	135	11
Elche (loan)	2014–15	La Liga	32	0	4	0	—		36	0
Espanyol (loan)	2015–16	La Liga	33	2	2	0	—		35	2
Cruz Azul	2016–17	Liga MX	24	1	9	0	—		33	1
Cruz Azul	2017–18	Liga MX	27	2	7	0	—		34	2
Cruz Azul	Total		51	3	16	0	—		67	3
Beşiktaş	2018–19	Süper Lig	6	0	—		4 (Note: Appearance(s) in UEFA Europa League)	1	10	1
Beşiktaş	2019–20	Süper Lig	11	0	2	0	4	1	17	1
Beşiktaş	2020–21	Süper Lig	—		—		0	0	0	0
Beşiktaş	Total		17	0	2	0	8	2	27	2
Fatih Karagümrük	2020–21	Süper Lig	31	3	0	0	—		31	3
Elche	2021–22	La Liga	30	1	2	0	—		32	1
Elche	2022–23	La Liga	22	0	1	0	—		23	0
Elche	Total		52	1	3	0	—		55	1
Al-Tai	2023–24	Saudi Pro League	30	1	0	0	—		30	1
Career Total			338	18	46	0	32	5	416	23

== International ==
As of match played on 24 June 2021
Scores and results list Chile's goal tally first, score column indicates score after each Roco goal.

List of international goals scored by Enzo Roco
No.	Date	Venue	Opponent	Score	Result	Competition
1	21 March 2012	Estadio Carlos Dittborn, Arica, Chile	Peru	2–1	3–1	Friendly

== Honours ==
Universidad Católica U18

- Campeonato Fútbol Joven: 2009

Universidad Católica

- Primera División: 2010
- Copa Chile: 2011

Chile

- Copa América: 2016

Individual

- Hijo Ilustre de Ovalle: 2016
