= José Antonio Peral =

Spanish footballer (born 1992)

Personal information
- Full name: José Antonio Peral Alonso
- Date of birth: 6 March 1992 (age 34)
- Place of birth: Elche, Spain
- Height: 1.78 m (5 ft 10 in)
- Position: Right-back

Team information
- Current team: Kelme Cadete A (manager)

Youth career
- Kelme
- Alicante
- 2008–2012: Elche

Senior career*
Years	Team	Apps	(Gls)
2012–2015	Elche B	34	(0)
2014	→ Sanluqueño (loan)	10	(1)
2015	Elche	0	(0)
2016	Borja	14	(0)
2019–2020	Athletic Torrellano	21	(3)
2020–2022	CFI Alicante	39	(5)
2022–2024	Callosa Deportiva	53	(5)
2024–2025	SC Torrevieja	21	(1)

Managerial career
- 2024–: Kelme (youth)
- * Club domestic league appearances and goals

José Antonio Peral Alonso (born 6 March 1992) is Spanish retired footballer who played mainly a right back, and the current manager of Kelme CF's Cadete A squad.

== Club career ==
Born in Elche, Valencian Community, Peral joined Elche CF's youth setup in 2008, after stints at locals Kelme CF and Alicante CF. He made his senior debuts with the reserves in 2012, in Tercera División.

On 30 January 2014 Peral was loaned to Segunda División B's Atlético Sanluqueño CF, until June. He returned to the Franjverdes in June, after appearing in ten matches and scoring one goal – his first as a senior – in a 1–2 away loss against FC Cartagena on 9 March.

On 3 January 2015, Peral was called up by the main squad for a La Liga match against Villarreal CF, but remained unused in the 2–2 draw at the Estadio Martínez Valero. He made his professional debut twelve days later, starting in 0–4 Copa del Rey home loss against FC Barcelona (0–9 on aggregate).

On 3 February 2016, after more than six months without a club, Peral signed for SD Borja also in the fourth level.
