= José Ángel (footballer, born March 1989) =

Spanish footballer (born 1989)

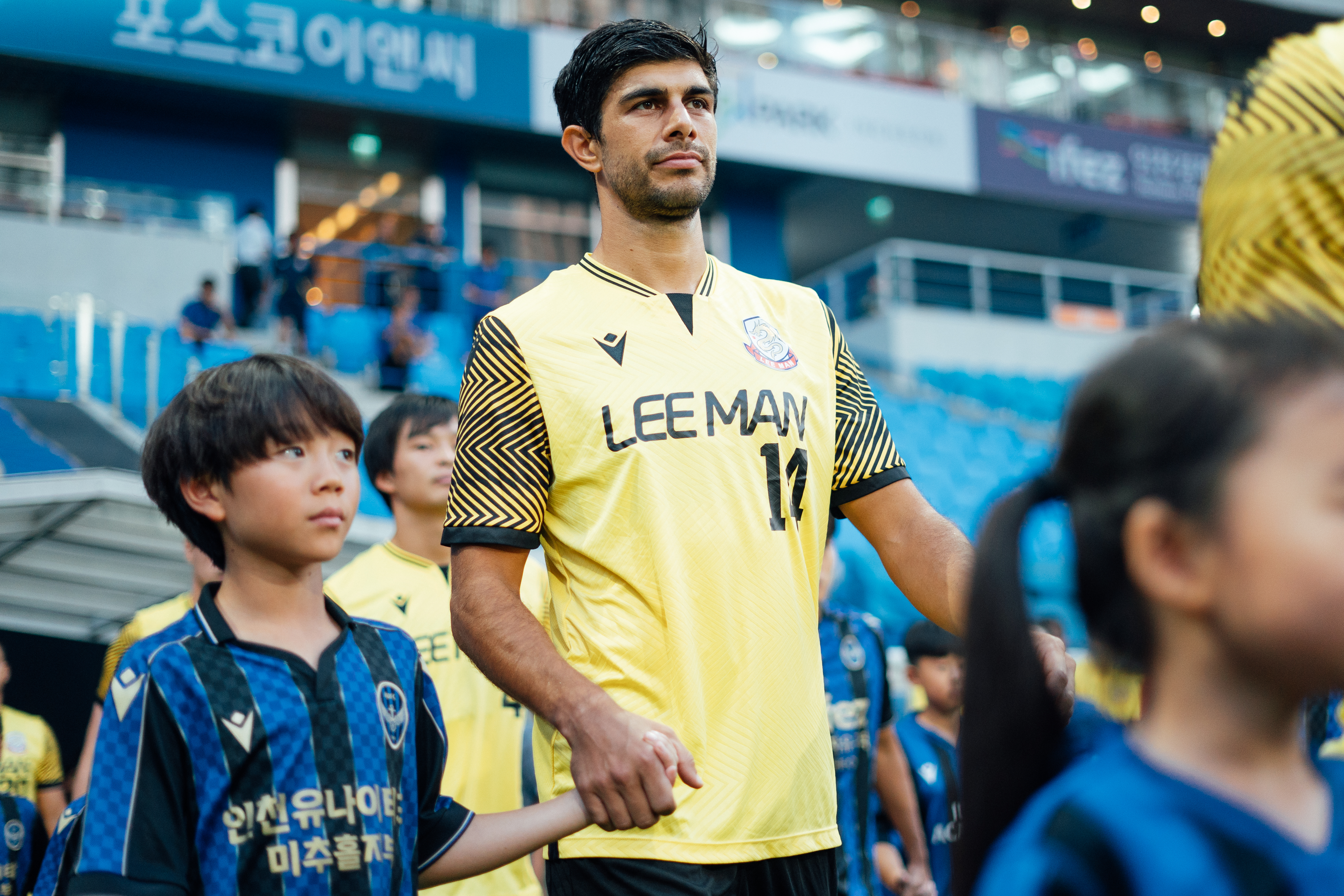
- José Ángel with Lee Man in 2023

Personal information
- Full name: José Ángel Alonso Martín
- Date of birth: 2 March 1989 (age 37)
- Place of birth: Salamanca, Spain
- Height: 1.84 m (6 ft 0 in)
- Position: Centre back

Youth career
- Salamanca

Senior career*
Years	Team	Apps	(Gls)
2008–2010	Salamanca B	62	(3)
2010–2013	Salamanca	68	(4)
2013–2014	Elche B	36	(3)
2014–2017	Elche	50	(2)
2017–2018	Mallorca	17	(0)
2018	Eastern	4	(2)
2020	Unionistas de Salamanca	9	(0)
2020–2024	Lee Man	40	(6)
- * Club domestic league appearances and goals as of 30 June 2024

José Ángel Alonso Martín (born 2 March 1989), commonly known as José Ángel, is a Spanish professional footballer who currently plays as a centre back.

== Football career ==
Born in Salamanca, Castile and León, José Ángel graduated from Salamanca's youth system, and made his senior debut with their reserves in the 2008–09 season, in Tercera División. In the summer of 2010, he was promoted to the first team that competed in Segunda División.

On 3 October 2010, José Ángel played his first game as a professional, coming on as a late substitute in a 1–0 away win against Villarreal B. He featured in eight matches during the campaign, as the Charros were relegated to Segunda División B.

José Ángel moved to Elche on 20 July 2013, being assigned to the B-side also in the third level, after Salamanca's dissolution. After featuring regularly, he was promoted to the main squad on 27 July of the following year, and signed a new three-year deal on 21 August.

José Ángel made his La Liga debut on 24 August 2014, starting as a defensive midfielder in a 0–3 away loss against Barcelona. He contributed with 13 appearances during the season, as the team suffered administrative relegation.

José Ángel scored his first professional goal on 24 May 2016, netting his team's only in a 1–2 away loss against Mallorca. On 19 July 2017, after suffering another drop, he moved to the latter club.

On 31 August 2018, José Ángel signed with Hong Kong Premier League club Eastern following a trial. He scored on his Hong Kong Premier League debut two days later, in a 3–2 home victory over R&F. On 27 October, he suffered a knee ligament injury in the Senior Challenge Shield match against Lee Man; although the club had initially hoped to rehabilitate his injury, it was confirmed on 26 November that the player would return to Spain in order to undergo ACL surgery, thus ending his season.

On 26 December 2019, José Ángel signed with Unionistas de Salamanca CF.

On 7 November 2020, it was reported that José Ángel would return to Hong Kong and sign for Lee Man.

On 4 February 2026, Jose Ángel signed with Sabah Football Club (Malaysia) for the season 2025/2026

José Ángel's older brother, Jorge, was also a footballer. A midfielder, he too was groomed at Salamanca.
