= Sergio Pelegrín =

Spanish footballer

Personal information
- Full name: Sergio Pelegrín López
- Date of birth: 18 April 1979 (age 47)
- Place of birth: Barcelona, Spain
- Height: 1.85 m (6 ft 1 in)
- Position: Centre-back

Youth career
- Espanyol

Senior career*
Years	Team	Apps	(Gls)
1998–2000	Espanyol B	40	(0)
2000–2001	Mallorca B	32	(0)
2001–2003	Zaragoza B	67	(7)
2003–2004	Girona	29	(1)
2004–2007	Alicante	94	(7)
2007–2009	Salamanca	67	(2)
2009–2010	Rayo Vallecano	36	(2)
2010–2015	Elche	116	(6)
2015–2016	Alavés	36	(3)
2016–2017	Elche	33	(2)
Total		550	(30)

International career
1997	Spain U17	5	(0)
1997	Spain U18	5	(0)
1998	Spain U20	2	(1)

Managerial career
- 2017–2018: Getafe (assistant)
- 2019–2020: Elche B
- 2021–2022: Hércules (assistant)
- * Club domestic league appearances and goals

Sergio Pelegrín López (born 18 April 1979) is a Spanish former professional footballer who played as a central defender. He was also a manager.

He played 260 Segunda División games during his career, totalling 15 goals for Salamanca, Rayo Vallecano, Elche (two spells) and Alavés. In La Liga, he appeared for the third club.

== Playing career ==
Born in Barcelona, Catalonia, Pelegrín spent until the age of 28 playing in the Segunda División B, where he represented RCD Espanyol B, RCD Mallorca B, Deportivo Aragón, Girona FC and Alicante CF. For the first team of the first and second clubs, he appeared in two official games apiece, in both cases in the UEFA Intertoto Cup.

Subsequently, Pelegrín moved to Segunda División, appearing for UD Salamanca, Rayo Vallecano and Elche CF. He scored a career-best four goals in 28 games in the 2011–12 season, then started in all his 35 league appearances the following campaign as the Valencian Community side returned to La Liga after 24 years.

Pelegrín became the oldest player to make his debut in the Spanish top flight on 4 November 2013 at age 34, coming on as a second-half substitute in a 0–1 home loss against Villarreal CF. On 30 June 2015, he signed a one-year deal with Deportivo Alavés in the second tier.

On 30 June 2016, after achieving another top-division promotion, Pelegrín left Alavés as his contract expired and returned to his former club Elche. He retired the following year aged 38, and joined Getafe CF's coaching staff under José Bordalás.

== Coaching career ==
In March 2019, Pelegrín took up the role of head coach at Elche CF Ilicitano. He was fired on 11 March 2020 after a poor run of results.

Pelegrín joined Sergio Mora's staff at Hércules CF on 15 July 2021.

== Managerial statistics ==
As of match played 28 September 2019

Managerial record by team and tenure
Team	Nat	From	To	Record								Ref
Team	Nat	From	To	G	W	D	L	GF	GA	GD	Win %	Ref
Elche B	(Spain)	11 March 2019	Present	16	8	4	4	25	14	+11	50.00	
Career total				16	8	4	4	25	14	+11	50.00	—

== Honours ==
Elche

- Segunda División: 2012–13

Alavés

- Segunda División: 2015–16
