= Edu Albácar =

Spanish footballer

Personal information
- Full name: Eduard Albácar Gallego
- Date of birth: 16 November 1979 (age 46)
- Place of birth: Tortosa, Spain
- Height: 1.77 m (5 ft 10 in)
- Position: Left-back

Youth career
- 1995–1996: Sant Jaume d'Enveja
- 1996–1997: Dertusa
- 1997–1998: Gimnàstic

Senior career*
Years	Team	Apps	(Gls)
1998–2000	La Sénia		
2000–2001	Tortosa	31	(0)
2001–2003	Espanyol B	24	(0)
2003–2004	Novelda	32	(0)
2004–2006	Alicante	58	(5)
2006–2008	Hércules	52	(0)
2008–2009	Alavés	28	(3)
2009–2010	Rayo Vallecano	30	(2)
2010–2015	Elche	137	(21)
2016–2018	Elche	37	(1)
2019	Sant Jaume d'Enveja	6	(3)
Total		435+	(35+)

Managerial career
- 2024: Athletic Torrellano
- * Club domestic league appearances and goals

Eduard 'Edu' Albácar Gallego (born 16 November 1979) is a Spanish former professional footballer who played as a left-back.

== Club career ==
Born in Tortosa, Tarragona, Catalonia, Albácar only played for Segunda División B and Tercera División teams until well into his 20s. In July 2006 he signed with Hércules CF in the Segunda División, and appeared in his first game as a professional on 27 August when he started in a 0–1 home loss against Málaga CF.

In June 2008, Albácar moved to Deportivo Alavés also in the second division. One year later, he signed with fellow second-tier club Rayo Vallecano.

On 22 July 2010, Albácar joined Elche CF. In his third year, he scored a career-best eight goals – mainly through free kicks and penalties– and also helped the Valencian side to return to La Liga after 24 years of absence.

On 24 August 2013, aged almost 34, Albácar made his debut in the top flight, starting in a 1–1 home draw against Real Sociedad. He scored his first goal in the competition six days later, in a 2–2 draw at UD Almería.

Albácar announced his retirement on 13 August 2015, being immediately included in Rubén Baraja's staff. Roughly a year later, he stepped down from retirement, returning to his last club Elche at the age of 36.

On 2 May 2018, Albácar announced that he would retire at the end of the season, which ended in promotion to the second division.

== Honours ==
Elche

- Segunda División: 2012–13
