= 2012–13 in Spanish football =

Football in Spain
- Season: 2012–13

Men's football
- La Liga: Barcelona
- Segunda División: Elche
- Segunda División B: Alavés
- Copa del Rey: Atlético Madrid
- Supercopa de España: Real Madrid

The 2012–13 season was the 109th season of competitive football in Spain. It started officially on 1 July 2012 and ended on 30 June 2013.

== Competitions dates ==
La Liga and Segunda División started for its first time around middle August, after previous season it was frustrated because of strike. All competitions made a break during Christmas holidays between 24 December 2012 and 3 January 2013.

Competition	Starts	Ends	Notes
La Liga	18 August 2012	1 June 2013	All weekends except breaks: 9 September, 14 October, winter break and 24 March. Pre-weekend: 21 December and 1 June. Draw was released on 10 July 2012.
Segunda División	17 August 2012	23 June 2013	All weekends except winter break. Pre-weekend: 21 December. Play-offs on 12, 16, 19 and 23 June 2013. Draw was released on 10 July 2012.
Segunda División B	25 August 2012	30 June 2013	All weekends except winter break. All league matches (regular phase) must finish at maximum on 19 May 2013. Play-offs in weekends from 26 May to 30 June 2013. Draw was released on 16 July 2012. Group III was rescheduled on 8 September 2012.
Tercera División	24 August 2012	30 June 2013	All weekends except winter break. All league matches (regular phase) from all groups must finish at maximum on 19 May 2013. Play-offs in weekends from 26 May to 30 June 2013.
Copa del Rey	29 August 2012	18 May 2013	Draws and calendar
Supercopa de España	23 August 2012	29 August 2012	
Copa Federación	1 August 2012	21 March 2013	
Primera División (women)	1 September 2012	5 May 2013	Calendar
Segunda División (women)	9 September 2012	21 April 2013	Calendar
Copa de la Reina	12 May 2013	16 June 2013	Calendar

== Transfer windows ==
=== Retirements ===
The following players retired from association football at the end of 2011–12 season or during this season, being the last club a member of 2012–13 La Liga or 2012–13 Segunda División:

Name	Club of retirement	Date
Ruud van Nistelrooy	Málaga	14 May 2012
Mikel Aranburu	Real Sociedad	14 May 2012
Aitor Ocio	Athletic Bilbao	14 June 2012

== Promotion and relegation (pre-season) ==
Teams promoted to 2012–13 La Liga

- Deportivo de La Coruña
- Celta de Vigo
- Real Valladolid

Teams relegated from 2011–12 La Liga

- Villarreal CF
- Sporting de Gijón
- Racing de Santander

Teams promoted to 2012–13 Segunda División

- Real Madrid Castilla
- CD Mirandés
- SD Ponferradina
- CD Lugo

Teams relegated from 2011–12 Segunda División

- Villarreal CF B
- FC Cartagena
- CD Alcoyano
- Gimnàstic de Tarragona

Teams promoted to 2012–13 Segunda División B

- Caudal Deportivo
- CF Fuenlabrada
- CD Marino
- CD Ourense
- Real Madrid C
- Avilés
- Barakaldo CF
- CD Izarra
- SD Logroñés
- SD Noja
- Peña Sport FC
- Racing de Santander B
- CD Tudelano
- CD Binissalem
- CD Constancia
- RCD Espanyol B
- Levante UD B
- AE Prat
- Yeclano Deportivo
- Arroyo CP
- Atlético Sanluqueño CF
- Loja CD
- San Fernando CD
- UCAM Murcia CF

Teams relegated from 2011–12 Segunda División B

- Celta de Vigo B
- UB Conquense
- Montañeros CF
- CD Toledo
- UD Vecindario
- Arandina CF
- Burgos CF
- Gimnástica Segoviana CF
- SD Lemona
- CF Palencia
- Andorra CF
- CD Dénia
- CF Gandía
- CD Manacor
- CF Sporting Mahonés
- CD Badajoz
- AD Ceuta
- CF La Unión
- Lorca Atlético CF
- Polideportivo Ejido
- CD Puertollano
- CD Roquetas
- Sporting Villanueva Promesas

== National team ==
The home team is on the left column; the away team is on the right column.

=== FIFA World Cup qualifiers ===
Spain was in Group I of the 2014 World Cup qualification process.

11 September 2012	Spain	1 – 0	Georgia	(Georgia (country)) Tbilisi
19:30 CEST; 21:30 Local time	Soldado 86'	Report		Stadium: Boris Paichadze; Attendance: 54,598; Referee: (Norway) Svein Oddvar Moen

12 October 2012	Spain	4 – 0	Belarus	(Belarus) Minsk
20:00 CEST; 21:00 Local time	Alba 12'; Pedro 21', 69', 72'	Report		Stadium: Dinamo Stadium; Attendance: 30,000; Referee: (Belgium) Serge Gumienny

16 October 2012	Spain	1 – 1	France	(Spain) Madrid
21:00 CEST	Ramos 25'	Report	Giroud 90+4'	Stadium: Vicente Calderón; Attendance: 46,000; Referee: (Germany) Felix Brych

22 March 2013	Spain	1 – 1	Finland	(Spain) Gijón
20:45 CET	Ramos 49'	Report	Pukki 79'	Stadium: El Molinón; Attendance: 27,637; Referee: Ovidiu Haţegan (Romania)

26 March 2013	Spain	1 – 0	France	(France) Saint-Denis
21:00 CET	Pedro 58'	Report		Stadium: Stade de France; Attendance: 78,329; Referee: Viktor Kassai (Hungary)

=== FIFA Confederations Cup ===
Spain participated in the 2013 FIFA Confederations Cup. Spain was in Group B and was winner in this group.

17 June 2013 Match 1	Spain	2 – 1	Uruguay	(Brazil) Recife
00:00 CEST; 16 June 2013 19:00 Local time	Pedro 20'; Soldado 32'	Report	Suárez 88'	Stadium: Arena Pernambuco; Attendance: 41,705; Referee: Yuichi Nishimura (Japan)

20 June 2013 Match 2	Spain	10 – 0	Tahiti	(Brazil) Rio de Janeiro
21:00 CEST; 16:00 Local time	Torres 5', 33', 57', 78'; Silva 31', 89'; Villa 39', 49', 64'; Mata 66'	Report		Stadium: Estádio do Maracanã, Rio de Janeiro; Attendance: 71,806; Referee: Djamel Haimoudi (Algeria)

23 June 2013 Match 3	Spain	3 – 0	Nigeria	(Brazil) Fortaleza
21:00 CEST; 16:00 Local time	Alba 3', 88'; Torres 62'	Report		Stadium: Estádio Castelão; Attendance: 51,263; Referee: Joel Aguilar (El Salvador)

27 June 2013 Semi-final	Spain	0 – 0 (a.e.t.) (7–6 p)	Italy	(Brazil) Fortaleza
21:00 CEST; 16:00 Local time		Report		Stadium: Estádio Castelão; Attendance: 56,083; Referee: Howard Webb (England)
	Penalties
	Xavi (penalty scored); Iniesta (penalty scored); Piqué (penalty scored); Ramos (penalty scored); Mata (penalty scored); Busquets (penalty scored); Navas (penalty scored)		(penalty scored) Candreva; (penalty scored) Aquilani; (penalty scored) De Rossi; (penalty scored) Giovinco; (penalty scored) Pirlo; (penalty scored) Montolivo; (penalty missed) Bonucci

1 July 2013 Final	Spain	0 – 3	Brazil	(Brazil) Rio de Janeiro
00:00 CEST; 30 June 2013 19:00 Local time		Report	Fred 2', 47'; Neymar 44'	Stadium: Estádio do Maracanã; Attendance: 73,531; Referee: Björn Kuipers (Netherlands)

=== Friendlies ===
15 August 2012	Spain	2 – 1	Puerto Rico	(Puerto Rico) Bayamón
22:30 CEST; 16:30 Local time	Cazorla 42'; Fàbregas 45'	Report	Cintron 65'	Stadium: Juan Ramón Loubriel; Attendance: 7,500; Referee: (Puerto Rico) Javier Santos

7 September 2012	Spain	5 – 0	Saudi Arabia	(Spain) Pontevedra
22:00 CEST	Cazorla 22'; Pedro 28', 73'; Xavi 47'; Villa 63' (pen.)	Report		Stadium: Nuevo Pasarón; Attendance: 11,850; Referee: (Azerbaijan) Anar Salmanov

14 November 2012	Spain	5 – 1	Panama	Panama City
22:30 CET; 16:30 Local time	Pedro 16', 43'; Villa 30'; Ramos 82'; Susaeta 84'	Report	Gómez 87' (pen.)	Stadium: Rommel Fernández; Attendance: 18,000; Referee: (Mexico) Mauricio Morales

6 February 2013	Spain	3 – 1	Uruguay	(Qatar) Doha
19:00 CET; 21:00 Local time	Fàbregas 16'; Pedro 51', 74'	Report	C. Rodríguez 32'	Stadium: Khalifa International; Attendance: 48,000; Referee: (Qatar) Fahad Al-Marri

8 June 2013	Spain	2 – 1	Haiti	(United States) Miami
22:00 CEST; 16:00 Local time	Cazorla 8'; Fàbregas 19'	Report	Guerrier 75'	Stadium: Sun Life; Attendance: 36,535; Referee: (United States) Juan Guzmán

12 June 2013	Spain	2 – 0	Republic of Ireland	(United States) New York City
02:00 CEST; 11 June 2013 20:00 Local time	Soldado 68'; Mata 88'	Report		Stadium: Yankee; Attendance: 39,368; Referee: (United States) Jair Marrufo

== Spanish friendly tournaments ==
List of some friendly matches or short tournaments celebrated in Spain, mainly at summer as part of pre-season, which participated La Liga and Segunda División teams. Other historical tournaments are also included.

21 July 2012 Trofeo Huerta de Europa	La Hoya Lorca (Spain)	0 – 1	(Spain) Granada	Lorca
19:30 CEST		Report	Machís 30'	Stadium: Francisco Artés Carrasco; Attendance: 1,000; Referee: Jorge Moya García

21 July 2012 Trofeo La Campiña	Marchamalo (Spain)	1 – 2	(Spain) Guadalajara	Marchamalo
19:45 CEST	Rony 59'	Report	Zazo 62'; Badía 83' (pen.)	Stadium: Campo de La Solana

25 July 2012 Ciudad de Vigo	Celta Vigo (Spain)	1 – 0	(Spain) Atlético Madrid	Vigo
20:30 CEST	Bermejo 75'	Report		Stadium: Balaídos; Attendance: 11,099; Referee: David Pérez Pallas

25 July 2012 Costa Brava	Girona (Spain)	0 – 1	(Spain) Sevilla	Girona
21:00 CEST		Report	Baba 47'	Stadium: Estadi Montilivi; Attendance: 2,751; Referee: Santiago Jaime Latre

26 July 2012 Ciudad de Zamora	Zamora (Spain)	0 – 2	(Spain) Guadalajara	Zamora
20:30 CEST		Report	Azkorra 82', 89'	Stadium: Ruta de la Plata; Attendance: 300; Referee: José Luis Hernández Cifuentes

28 July 2012 Vila de Palamós	Palamós (Spain)	0 – 3	(Spain) Sabadell	Palamós
18:30 CEST		Report	Llorente 35'; Ruiz 80'; Aníbal 91'	Stadium: Nou Municipal de Palamós; Attendance: 400; Referee: Anna Zardaín López

28 July 2012 Trofeo Vega Baja	Almoradí (Spain)	0 – 3	(Spain) Elche	Almoradí
19:30 CEST		Report	Xumetra 54'; Jornet 60'; Xumetra 87'	Stadium: El Sadrián; Attendance: 1,971; Referee: Daniel Sánchez Bailén

28 July 2012 Trofeo Naranja	Valencia (Spain)	1 – 1 (2 – 0 p)	(Portugal) Porto	Valencia
21:30 CEST	Jonas 63'	Report	González 57'	Stadium: Mestalla; Attendance: 23,000; Referee: Francisco Javier Mateo Valero
	Penalties
	Parejo (penalty scored); Gago (penalty scored); Bernat (penalty missed)		(penalty missed) Kléber; (penalty missed) Iturbe; (penalty missed) Kelvin; (penalty missed) Moutinho

29 July 2012 Emma Cuervo	Deportivo La Coruña (Spain)	1 – 4	(Spain) Sporting Gijón	Ribadeo
19:00 CEST	Saúl 20'	Report	Bilić 4'; Trejo 14'; Sangoy 69', 89'	Stadium: Estadio Pepe Barrera; Attendance: 3,500; Referee: Enrique Corral García

31 July 2012 Villa de Bergara	Real Sociedad (Spain)	2 – 1	(Spain) Zaragoza	Bergara
19:00 CEST	Agirretxe 10', 69'	Report	González 50'	Stadium: Agorrosin; Attendance: 1,000; Referee: Aitor Gorostegui Fernández

1 August 2012 Memorial Ramón Losada	Sporting Gijón (Spain)	1 – 1 (1 – 4 p)	(Spain) Valladolid	Luarca
19:30 CEST	Carmelo 47'	Report	Guerra 31'	Stadium: La Veigona; Attendance: 700; Referee: Pablo Fernández Pérez
	Penalties
	Bilić (penalty scored); Cases (penalty missed); Morán (penalty missed)		(penalty scored) Peña; (penalty scored) Bueno; (penalty scored) Neira; (penalty scored) Baraja

3 August 2012 Ciutat de Barcelona	Espanyol (Spain)	2 – 0	(France) Montpellier	Cornellà de Llobregat
21:45 CEST	Fonte 63'; Forlín 68'	Report		Stadium: Cornellà-El Prat; Attendance: 5,730; Referee: Alfonso Javier Álvarez Izquierdo

3 August 2012 Trofeo Colombino Semifinal 1	Getafe (Spain)	1 – 0	(Portugal) Sporting CP	Huelva
20:00 CEST	D. Castro 58'	Report		Stadium: Nuevo Colombino; Attendance: 500; Referee: Jesús Gil Manzano

3 August 2012 Trofeo Colombino Semifinal 2	Recreativo Huelva (Spain)	0 – 0 (8 – 7 p)	(Morocco) Moghreb Tétouan	Huelva
22:45 CEST		Report		Stadium: Nuevo Colombino; Attendance: 2,000; Referee: Jesús Arroyo Cortés
	Penalties
	Montoro (penalty missed); Morcillo (penalty scored); Berrocal (penalty scored); Ernesto (penalty scored); Vega (penalty scored); Aitor (penalty scored); Matamala (penalty scored); Dimas (penalty scored); Cifu (penalty scored)		Fall Serigne (penalty scored); Serge (penalty scored); Naussair (penalty missed); Smaali (penalty scored); Magribilal (penalty scored); Abdeladim (penalty scored); Chafiq (penalty scored); Moussa (penalty scored); El Kizani Samir (penalty missed)

4 August 2012 Trofeo Colombino 3rd/4th	Sporting CP (Portugal)	3 – 1	(Morocco) Moghreb Tétouan	Huelva
22:45 CEST	Carriço 42'; Van Wolfswinkel 66' (pen.); Mortada 71' (o.g.)	Report	Moussa 54'	Stadium: Nuevo Colombino; Attendance: 200; Referee: Manuel de los Santos Mellado

4 August 2012 Trofeo Colombino Final	Recreativo Huelva (Spain)	1 – 2	(Spain) Getafe	Huelva
22:45 CEST	Rubio 89' (pen.)	Report	Alexis 9'; Sarabia 15'	Stadium: Nuevo Colombino; Attendance: 1,500; Referee: José Luis Paradas Romero

4 August 2012 Trofeo Cervantes	Alcalá (Spain)	0 – 2	(Spain) Guadalajara	Alcalá de Henares
20:00 CEST		Report	Susaeta 40'; Azkorra 81'	Stadium: Municipal El Val; Attendance: 500; Referee: Santiago Cuesta Ferreiro

4 August 2012 Copa Mahou Canarias, 1st leg	Tenerife (Spain)	0 – 0	(Spain) Las Palmas	Santa Cruz de Tenerife
20:30 WEST		Report		Stadium: Heliodoro Rodríguez López; Attendance: 2,382; Referee: Ariel González Sicilia

7 August 2012 Diputación de Granada	Granada (Spain)	2 – 1	(Portugal) Vitória de Guimarães	Granada
21:00 CEST	El-Arabi 30'; Romero 90+1'	Report	Teles 36'	Stadium: Nuevo Los Cármenes; Attendance: 16,000; Referee: Carlos del Cerro Grande

8 August 2012 Carabela de Plata	Cartagena (Spain)	1 – 1 (10 – 11 p)	(Spain) Hércules	Cartagena
20:30 CEST	Florian 21'	Report	Muñoz 62'	Stadium: Cartagonova; Attendance: 3,529; Referee: Antonio Robles Martínez
	Penalties
	Perona (penalty scored); Riau (penalty missed); Florian (penalty scored); Álvarez (penalty scored); Rico (penalty scored); Álvarez (penalty scored); Nadal (penalty scored); Rueda (penalty missed); Jiménez (penalty scored); Sánchez (penalty scored); Ibáñez (penalty scored); Perona (penalty scored); Riau (penalty missed)		Raúl (penalty scored); Rivas (penalty scored); Callejón (penalty scored); Sanchón (penalty scored); Hadžić (penalty missed); Brian (penalty scored); Mérida (penalty scored); Víctor (penalty missed); Guille (penalty scored); Sellés (penalty scored); Falcón (penalty scored); Raúl (penalty scored); Guille (penalty scored)

8 August 2012 Antonio Puerta	Sevilla (Spain)	2 – 0	(Spain) Deportivo La Coruña	Seville
22:00 CEST	Negredo 30'; Trochowski 44'	Report		Stadium: Ramón Sánchez Pizjuán; Attendance: 25,000; Referee: Pedro Jesús Pérez Montero

10 August 2012 Ciutat de Tarragona	Gimnàstic de Tarragona (Spain)	1 – 0	(Spain) Villarreal	Tarragona
20:30 CEST	Eugeni 83' (pen.)	Report		Stadium: Nou Estadi; Attendance: 1,832; Referee: José Emilio Sánchez Aparicio

10 August 2012 Festa d'Elx	Elche (Spain)	1 – 3	(Spain) Almería	Elche
21:00 CEST	Mantecón 77' (pen.)	Report	Charles 4', 90'; Casquero 29'	Stadium: Manuel Martínez Valero; Attendance: 3,212; Referee: José Luis Lesma López

10 August 2012 Trofeo Carranza Semifinal 1	Osasuna (Spain)	1 – 2	(Portugal) Nacional	Cádiz
19:00 CEST	Sola 64'	Report	Rondón 23'; Mateus 41'	Stadium: Ramón de Carranza; Attendance: 1,000; Referee: José Luis González González

10 August 2012 Trofeo Carranza Semifinal 2	Cádiz (Spain)	3 – 6	(Spain) Rayo Vallecano	Cádiz
22:00 CEST	Sánchez 16' (pen.); Belencoso 24'; Gallardo 82'	Report	Fall 26' (o.g.); Juli 44'; Bangoura 47'; Adrián 50'; Delibašić 57'; Nono 87'	Stadium: Ramón de Carranza; Attendance: 1,500; Referee: Jorge Figueroa Vázquez

11 August 2012 Trofeo Carranza 3rd/4th	Cádiz (Spain)	0 – 1	(Spain) Osasuna	Cádiz
19:00 CEST		Report	Arribas 89'	Stadium: Ramón de Carranza; Attendance: 950; Referee: Juan Martínez Munuera

11 August 2012 Trofeo Carranza Final	Rayo Vallecano (Spain)	1 – 3	(Portugal) Nacional	Cádiz
22:00 CEST	Adrián 44'	Report	Isael 3'; Revson 55'; Rondón 84'	Stadium: Ramón de Carranza; Attendance: 1,000; Referee: Carlos Delgado Ferreiro

11 August 2012 Villa de Leganés	Leganés (Spain)	3 – 1	(Spain) Alcorcón	Leganés
20:00 CEST	Cristian 23'; Vega 60'; Adai 86'	Report	Postigo 80'	Stadium: Municipal de Butarque; Attendance: 2,100; Referee: Israel Mingo Bravo

11 August 2012 Teresa Herrera	Deportivo La Coruña (Spain)	2 – 2 (4 – 3 p)	(Spain) Atlético Madrid	A Coruña
21:00 CEST	Valerón 8'; Gama 56'	Report	Koke 11'; Falcao 85'	Stadium: Riazor; Attendance: 18,000; Referee: Miguel Ángel Pérez Lasa
	Penalties
	Pizzi (penalty scored); Oliveira (penalty missed); Santos (penalty scored); Gama (penalty scored); Aguilar (penalty scored)		Falcao (penalty scored); Rodríguez (penalty scored); García (penalty scored); Adrián (penalty missed); Godín (penalty missed)

11 August 2012 Costa del Sol	Málaga (Spain)	1 – 0	(England) Everton	Málaga
21:00 CEST	Weligton 74'	Report		Stadium: La Rosaleda; Attendance: 6,000; Referee: Pedro Jesús Pérez Montero

11 August 2012 Ciudad de Zaragoza - Memorial Carlos Lapetra	Zaragoza (Spain)	1 – 1 (5 – 4 p)	(Spain) Espanyol	Zaragoza
21:00 CEST	Apoño 27' (pen.)	Report	Verdú 32' (pen.)	Stadium: La Romareda; Attendance: 3,500; Referee: Carlos Clos Gómez
	Penalties
	Álamo (penalty scored); V. Rodríguez (penalty scored); Aranda (penalty scored); Apoño (penalty scored); Obradović (penalty missed); Goni (penalty scored)		Christian (penalty scored); Fonte (penalty missed); Forlín (penalty scored); Wakaso (penalty scored); Moreno (penalty scored); V. Álvarez (penalty missed)

11 August 2012 Ciutat de Palma	Mallorca (Spain)	0 – 1	(Germany) Hamburger SV	Palma
21:00 CEST		Report	Berg 34'	Stadium: Iberostar; Attendance: 8,053; Referee: Pedro Sureda Cuenca

11 August 2012 Villa de Gijón	Sporting Gijón (Spain)	0 – 2	(Portugal) Vitória de Guimarães	Gijón
21:00 CEST		Report	Defendi 48', 73'	Stadium: El Molinón; Attendance: 9,000; Referee: José Ramón Piñeiro Crespo

11 August 2012 Trofeu de la Ceràmica	Villarreal (Spain)	2 – 1	(Spain) Levante	Villarreal
21:00 CEST	Navarro 39' (o.g.); Trigueros 63'	Report	Ángel 11'	Stadium: El Madrigal; Attendance: 5,000; Referee: Juan Martínez Munuera

11 August 2012 Trofeo de la Vendimia	Xerez (Spain)	0 – 0 (3 – 4 p)	(Spain) Granada	Jerez de la Frontera
21:00 CEST		Report		Stadium: Chapín; Attendance: 2,699; Referee: José Caucelo Sace
	Penalties
	Poley (penalty scored); Vélez (penalty scored); Mendoza (penalty missed); Herrero (penalty scored); Rey (penalty missed)		Jaime (penalty missed); M. Rico (penalty scored); Machís (penalty scored); Benítez (penalty scored); Roberto (penalty scored)

11 August 2012 Copa Mahou Canarias, 2nd leg	Las Palmas (Spain)	1 – 0 (1 – 0 agg.)	(Spain) Tenerife	Las Palmas de Gran Canaria
20:30 WEST	Suárez 89' (pen.)	Report		Stadium: Gran Canaria; Attendance: 5,832; Referee: Alejandro Hernández Hernández

11 August 2012 Trofeo Decano	Recreativo Huelva (Spain)	2 – 2 (3 – 4 p)	(Spain) Real Madrid Castilla	Lepe
22:00 CEST	Szymanowski 70'; Valle 71'	Report	Sobrino 24'; Juanfran 90+1'	Stadium: Ciudad de Lepe; Attendance: 1,100; Referee: Luis Mario Milla Alvéndiz
	Penalties
	Ernesto (penalty scored); Zamora (penalty missed); Valle (penalty scored); Szymanowski (penalty scored); Bonaque (penalty missed)		Mosquera (penalty missed); De Tomás (penalty scored); Ríos (penalty scored); García (penalty scored); Mateos (penalty scored)

12 August 2012 Torneo de la Galleta	Racing Santander (Spain)	2 – 1	(Spain) Guadalajara	Aguilar de Campoo
18:00 CEST	Rivero 71'; Gullón 77'	Report	Jony 13'	Stadium: Alberto Fernández; Attendance: 800; Referee: Fernando Román Román

12 August 2012 Memorial Quinocho	Celta Vigo (Spain)	1 – 0	(England) Wigan Athletic	Vigo
20:30 CEST	Aspas 49'	Report		Stadium: Balaídos; Attendance: 6,504; Referee: Ignacio Iglesias Villanueva

14 August 2012 Trofeo Teide	Tenerife (Spain)	1 – 2	(Spain) Marino	La Orotava
20:00 WEST	Martín 60'	Report	Real 71'; Pérez 76'	Stadium: Los Cuartos; Attendance: 1,000; Referee: Carlos Díaz García

15 August 2012 Trofeo Playa y Sol	Águilas (Spain)	0 – 0 (3 – 5 p)	(Spain) La Hoya Lorca	Águilas
19:00 CEST		Report		Stadium: El Rubial; Attendance: 500; Referee: Samuel De Haro Tirado
	Penalties
	Gilé (penalty missed); Díaz (penalty scored); Soto (penalty scored); Olivares (penalty scored)		Martín (penalty scored); Prior (penalty scored); Juanito (penalty scored); Álex (penalty scored); Pérez (penalty scored)

17 August 2012 Torneo de San Ginés	Lanzarote (Spain)	3 – 1	(Spain) Tenerife	Arrecife
21:00 WEST	Rosmen 8'; Yunes 12'; Juancar 86'	Report	Martín 38'	Stadium: Ciudad Deportiva de Lanzarote; Attendance: 350; Referee: Juan Pedro Duque Ferrer

20 August 2012 Joan Gamper	Barcelona (Spain)	0 – 1	(Italy) Sampdoria	Barcelona
22:00 CEST		Report	Soriano 1'	Stadium: Camp Nou; Attendance: 55,498; Referee: Fernando Teixeira Vitienes

29 August 2012 Trofeo Vallecas	Rayo Vallecano (Spain)	1 – 2	(United Arab Emirates) Al Ain	Madrid
19:30 CEST	Quero 86'	Report	Ismail 8'; Aziz Fayed 30'	Stadium: Campo de Vallecas; Attendance: 4,000; Referee: José Luis Lesma López

30 August 2012 Trofeo Alcalde Villa de Los Barrios	Los Barrios (Spain)	1 – 6	(Spain) Sevilla	Los Barrios
21:00 CEST	Abel 25'	Report	Alfaro 8', 72'; Rubio 46', 51'; Trochowski 78', 87'	Stadium: San Rafael; Attendance: 1,500; Referee: Pedro Lobatón Sánchez

5 September 2012 Trofeo Alcarria	Guadalajara (Spain)	2 – 2 (4 – 2 p)	(Spain) Rayo Vallecano	Guadalajara
20:00 CEST	Susaeta 28'; Kepa 64'	Report	Sueliton 44'; Perea 75'	Stadium: Pedro Escartín; Attendance: 1,200; Referee: Dámaso Arcediano Monescillo
	Penalties
	Badía (penalty scored); Antón (penalty missed); Kepa (penalty scored); Ortiz (penalty scored); Espín (penalty scored)		Trashorras (penalty missed); Adrián (penalty scored); José Carlos (penalty scored); Bille (penalty missed)

5 September 2012 Trofeo Ayuntamiento de Segovia	Gimnástica Segoviana (Spain)	0 – 0 (4 – 5 p)	(Spain) Getafe	Segovia
20:00 CEST		Report		Stadium: La Albuera; Attendance: 200; Referee: Francisco José Manso García
	Penalties
	Calleja (penalty scored); Borja (penalty scored); Owen (penalty scored); Lázaro (penalty missed); Brañas (penalty scored)		Colunga (penalty scored); Pedro León (penalty scored); Torres (penalty scored); Mané (penalty scored); Gavilán (penalty scored)

5 September 2012 Trofeo Puchero	Alcorcón (Spain)	2 – 1	(Spain) Zaragoza	Alcorcón
21:00 CEST	Morán 8'; Riera 70'	Report	Aranda 19'	Stadium: Santo Domingo; Attendance: 3,000; Referee: Jorge Valdés Aller

6 September 2012 Ciutat d'Alcoi	Alcoyano (Spain)	0 – 3	(Spain) Valencia	Alcoi
21:00 CEST		Report	Barragán 18'; Piatti 51'; Viera 88'	Stadium: El Collao; Attendance: 5,000; Referee: Francisco Javier Barberá Fuentes

7 September 2012 Ciudad de Valladolid	Valladolid (Spain)	2 – 2 (1 – 3 p)	(Spain) Athletic Bilbao	Valladolid
20:00 CEST	Ebert 6'; Neira 86'	Report	Ibai 36'; Toquero 87'	Stadium: Nuevo José Zorrilla; Attendance: 6,638; Referee: José Luis González González
	Penalties
	Peña (penalty missed); Sastre (penalty scored); Baraja (penalty missed); Neira (penalty missed)		San José (penalty scored); Aduriz (penalty missed); Ibai (penalty missed); Iturraspe (penalty scored); Aurtenetxe (penalty scored)

26 September 2012 Trofeo Bernabéu	Real Madrid (Spain)	8 – 0	(Colombia) Millonarios	Madrid
20:30 CEST	Kaká 14', 38', 60' (pen.); Callejón 23', 68'; Morata 31', 36'; Benzema 79'	Report		Stadium: Santiago Bernabéu; Attendance: 30,000; Referee: Carlos del Cerro Grande

10 October 2012 Torneo Fiestas de San Nicasio	Leganés (Spain)	1 – 2	(Spain) Rayo Vallecano	Leganés
20:00 CEST	Quero 12'	Report	Bille 17'; Alcañiz 57'	Stadium: Municipal de Butarque; Attendance: 1,000; Referee: Hugo José López Puerta

10 October 2012 Trofeo del Olivo	Real Jaén (Spain)	1 – 0	(Spain) Betis	Jaén
21:00 CEST	Elady 53'	Report		Stadium: Nuevo La Victoria; Attendance: 4,000; Referee: Jesús Benjumea Álvarez

11 October 2012 Trofeo Luis Otero	Pontevedra (Spain)	2 – 2 (3 – 4 p)	(Spain) Deportivo La Coruña	Pontevedra
20:15 CEST	Tubo 50'; Moisés 60'	Report	Saúl 47'; Camuñas 56'	Stadium: Pasarón; Attendance: 1,500; Referee: Manuel Vidal Araujo
	Penalties
	Moisés (penalty missed); Pacheco (penalty missed); Breogán (penalty scored); Emilio (penalty scored); Jacobo (penalty scored); Buba (penalty missed)		Saúl (penalty missed); Aythami (penalty scored); Juan Domínguez (penalty missed); André (penalty scored); Valerón (penalty scored); Ayoze (penalty scored)

12 October 2012 Canal de Castilla Trophy	Valladolid (Spain)	0 – 1	(Spain) Getafe	Medina de Rioseco
17:00 CEST		Report	Fraile 22'	Stadium: Municipal de Medina de Rioseco; Attendance: 1,500; Referee: Jorge Gaspar Barajas

6 February 2013 Ourense Termal Trophy	Ourense (Spain)	1 – 2	(Spain) Celta Vigo	Ourense
21:00 CEST	Arce 71'	Report	Mina 17'; García 63'	Stadium: O Couto; Attendance: 2,000; Referee: Aitor Cid Puga

=== Other unofficial/friendly tournaments ===
Other unofficial major tournaments or friendly matches celebrated in Spain were:

- 2012 Supercopa de Catalunya (suspended)
- 2012 Castilla y León Cup
- 2011–12 Copa Catalunya Final
- 2012–13 Copa Catalunya
- 2012 Basque Country national football team friendly match
- 2013 Catalonia national football team friendly match (Trofeu Catalunya Internacional)
- 2013 Maspalomas International Football Tournament
- 2013 Football Impact Cup
- 2013 Copa del Sol
- 2013 Costa del Sol Trophy
- 2013 Bahía de Cádiz Cup
- 2013 Marbella Cup
- 2013 La Manga Cup

== Competitions ==
=== Trophy & League Champions ===
Competition	Winner	Details	At
La Liga	Barcelona	2012–13 La Liga	Cornellà-El Prat
Segunda División	Elche	2012–13 Segunda División (Play-Off 2ª)	Manuel Martínez Valero
Segunda División B	Overall Champions: Deportivo Alavés; Overall Runners-up: Tenerife; Group 1: Tenerife; Group 2: Deportivo Alavés; Group 3: L'Hospitalet; Group 4: Real Jaén	2012–13 Segunda División B (Play-Off 2ªB)	Heliodoro Rodríguez López
Tercera División	Group 1: Racing de Ferrol; Group 2: CD Tuilla; Group 3: CD Tropezón; Group 4: CD Laudio; Group 5: UE Olot; Group 6: Elche CF Ilicitano; Group 7: CD Puerta Bonita; Group 8: Burgos CF; Group 9: CD El Palo; Group 10: Algeciras CF; Group 11: Santa Eulàlia; Group 12: UD Las Palmas Atlético; Group 13: La Hoya Lorca CF; Group 14: Extremadura UD; Group 15: AD San Juan; Group 16: Haro Deportivo; Group 17: CD Sariñena; Group 18: CD Toledo	2012–13 Tercera División (Play-Off 3ª)	—
Copa del Rey	Atlético Madrid	2012–13 Copa del Rey	Santiago Bernabéu
Supercopa de España	Real Madrid	2012 Supercopa de España; Beat Barcelona 4–4 on agg. away goals (3–2 away and 2–1 home)	Santiago Bernabéu
Copa Federación de España	UE Sant Andreu	2012–13 Copa Federación de España	Narcís Sala
Primera División (women)	Barcelona	2012–13 Primera División (women)	San Mamés
Segunda División (women)	Group 1: Oviedo Moderno CF; Group 2: Añorga KKE; Group 3: Girona FC; Group 4: Granada CF; Group 5: AD Torrejón CF; Group 6: CD Achamán Santa Lucía; Group 7: Fundación Albacete; Group 8: CD Charco del Pino	2012–13 Segunda División (women)	—
Copa de la Reina	Barcelona	2013 Copa de la Reina	La Ciudad del Fútbol

== League tables ==
=== La Liga ===
Pos	Team	Pld	W	D	L	GF	GA	GD	Pts	Qualification or relegation
1	Barcelona (C)	38	32	4	2	115	40	+75	100	Qualification for the Champions League group stage
2	Real Madrid	38	26	7	5	103	42	+61	85	Qualification for the Champions League group stage
3	Atlético Madrid	38	23	7	8	65	31	+34	76	Qualification for the Champions League group stage
4	Real Sociedad	38	18	12	8	70	49	+21	66	Qualification for the Champions League play-off round
5	Valencia	38	19	8	11	67	54	+13	65	Qualification for the Europa League group stage (Note: Since the 2012–13 Copa del Rey champions Atlético Madrid and runners-up Real Madrid qualified for the 2013–14 UEFA Champions League, the 5th, 6th and 7th placed teams qualified for the group stage, play-off round, and third qualifying round of the 2013–14 UEFA Europa League respectively.)
6	Málaga	38	16	9	13	53	50	+3	57	(Note: Málaga was excluded from participating in any UEFA club competition in 2013–14 season as a punishment for not complying with UEFA Financial Fair Play Regulations. Málaga appealed against this UEFA ban, but the Court of Arbitration for Sport confirmed the decision of the UEFA Club Financial Control Body.)
7	Real Betis	38	16	8	14	57	56	+1	56	Qualification for the Europa League play-off round
8	Rayo Vallecano	38	16	5	17	50	66	−16	53	(Note: Rayo Vallecano was excluded from participating in any UEFA club competition for the next season after RFEF denied them a "UEFA licence" because they didn't meet the requirements as they were immersed in a creditor contest. They appealed to CAS in June 2013 and on 11 July that decision was confirmed. The team placed behind them, Sevilla, took their spot at the Europa League third qualifying round.)
9	Sevilla	38	14	8	16	58	54	+4	50	Qualification for the Europa League third qualifying round
10	Getafe	38	13	8	17	43	57	−14	47	
11	Levante	38	12	10	16	40	57	−17	46	
12	Athletic Bilbao	38	12	9	17	44	65	−21	45	
13	Espanyol	38	11	11	16	43	52	−9	44	
14	Valladolid	38	11	10	17	49	58	−9	43	
15	Granada	38	11	9	18	37	54	−17	42	
16	Osasuna	38	10	9	19	33	50	−17	39	
17	Celta Vigo	38	10	7	21	37	52	−15	37	
18	Mallorca (R)	38	9	9	20	43	72	−29	36	Relegation to Segunda División
19	Deportivo La Coruña (R)	38	8	11	19	47	70	−23	35	Relegation to Segunda División
20	Zaragoza (R)	38	9	7	22	37	62	−25	34	Relegation to Segunda División

Source: La Liga
Rules for classification: 1st points; 2nd head-to-head points; 3rd head-to-head goal difference; 4th goal difference; 5th number of goals scored; 7th Fair-play points
(C) Champions; (R) Relegated

=== Segunda División ===
Pos	Team	Pld	W	D	L	GF	GA	GD	Pts	Promotion, qualification or relegation
1	Elche (C, P)	42	23	13	6	54	27	+27	82	Promotion to La Liga
2	Villarreal (P)	42	21	14	7	68	38	+30	77	Promotion to La Liga
3	Almería (P)	42	22	8	12	72	50	+22	74	Qualification to promotion play-offs
4	Girona	42	21	8	13	74	56	+18	71	Qualification to promotion play-offs
5	Alcorcón	42	21	6	15	57	55	+2	69	Qualification to promotion play-offs
6	Las Palmas	42	18	12	12	62	55	+7	66 (Note: LPA 1–0 PON; PON 0–1 LPA)	Qualification to promotion play-offs
7	Ponferradina	42	19	9	14	57	50	+7	66	
8	Real Madrid Castilla	42	17	8	17	80	62	+18	59	
9	Barcelona B	42	15	12	15	76	71	+5	57	
10	Sporting Gijón	42	15	11	16	60	53	+7	56 (Note: SPG 1–1 LUG; LUG 1–2 SPG)	
11	Lugo	42	15	11	16	46	54	−8	56	
12	Numancia	42	13	16	13	53	55	−2	55	
13	Recreativo	42	15	9	18	46	57	−11	54 (Note: CÓR 0–2 REC; REC 2–1 CÓR)	
14	Córdoba	42	15	9	18	55	55	0	54	
15	Mirandés	42	13	13	16	35	51	−16	52 (Note: SAB 1–1 MIR; MIR 2–0 SAB)	
16	Sabadell	42	14	10	18	54	69	−15	52	
17	Hércules	42	13	11	18	43	53	−10	50 (Note: HÉR 0–0 GUA; GUA 0–2 HÉR)	
18	Guadalajara (R)	42	12	14	16	46	53	−7	50	Relegation to Segunda División B (Note: Guadalajara were relegated to the Segunda División B by the LFP. Guadalajara had appealed the decision, but LFP confirmed the sanction. CEDD also confirmed the relegation.)
19	Murcia	42	12	11	19	43	56	−13	47	
20	Racing Santander (R)	42	12	10	20	38	51	−13	46	Relegation to Segunda División B
21	Huesca (R)	42	11	12	19	46	58	−12	45	Relegation to Segunda División B
22	Xerez (R)	42	7	9	26	38	74	−36	30	Relegation to Tercera División (Note: Xerez were relegated to the Tercera División on 1 August after enduring serious financial difficulties for several years.)

Source: LFP - Liga Adelante
Rules for classification: 1st points; 2nd head-to-head points; 3rd head-to-head goal difference; 4th head-to-head goals scored; 5th goal difference; 6th number of goals scored; 7th Fair-play points
(C) Champions; (P) Promoted; (R) Relegated

== Spanish clubs in Europe ==
=== UEFA Champions League ===
==== Play-off round ====
Team 1	Agg.	Team 2	1st leg	2nd leg
Málaga (Spain)	2–0	(Greece) Panathinaikos	2–0	0–0

==== Group stage ====
===== Group C =====
Pos	Team	Pld	W	D	L	GF	GA	GD	Pts	Qualification	MLG	MIL	ZEN	AND
1	(Spain) Málaga	6	3	3	0	12	5	+7	12	Advance to knockout phase	—	1–0	3–0	2–2
2	(Italy) Milan	6	2	2	2	7	6	+1	8	Advance to knockout phase	1–1	—	0–1	0–0
3	(Russia) Zenit Saint Petersburg	6	2	1	3	6	9	−3	7	Transfer to Europa League	2–2	2–3	—	1–0
4	(Belgium) Anderlecht	6	1	2	3	4	9	−5	5		0–3	1–3	1–0	—

Source: Soccerway

===== Group D =====
Pos	Team	Pld	W	D	L	GF	GA	GD	Pts	Qualification	DOR	RMA	AJX	MCI
1	(Germany) Borussia Dortmund	6	4	2	0	11	5	+6	14	Advance to knockout phase	—	2–1	1–0	1–0
2	(Spain) Real Madrid	6	3	2	1	15	9	+6	11	Advance to knockout phase	2–2	—	4–1	3–2
3	(Netherlands) Ajax	6	1	1	4	8	16	−8	4	Transfer to Europa League	1–4	1–4	—	3–1
4	(England) Manchester City	6	0	3	3	7	11	−4	3		1–1	1–1	2–2	—

Source: Soccerway

===== Group F =====
Pos	Team	Pld	W	D	L	GF	GA	GD	Pts	Qualification	BAY	VAL	BATE	LIL
1	(Germany) Bayern Munich	6	4	1	1	15	7	+8	13 (Note: Head-to-head points: Bayern Munich 4, Valencia 1.)	Advance to knockout phase	—	2–1	4–1	6–1
2	(Spain) Valencia	6	4	1	1	12	5	+7	13	Advance to knockout phase	1–1	—	4–2	2–0
3	(Belarus) BATE Borisov	6	2	0	4	9	15	−6	6	Transfer to Europa League	3–1	0–3	—	0–2
4	(France) Lille	6	1	0	5	4	13	−9	3		0–1	0–1	1–3	—

Source: Soccerway

===== Group G =====
Pos	Team	Pld	W	D	L	GF	GA	GD	Pts	Qualification	BAR	CEL	BEN	SPM
1	(Spain) Barcelona	6	4	1	1	11	5	+6	13	Advance to knockout phase	—	2–1	0–0	3–2
2	(Scotland) Celtic	6	3	1	2	9	8	+1	10	Advance to knockout phase	2–1	—	0–0	2–1
3	(Portugal) Benfica	6	2	2	2	5	5	0	8	Transfer to Europa League	0–2	2–1	—	2–0
4	(Russia) Spartak Moscow	6	1	0	5	7	14	−7	3		0–3	2–3	2–1	—

Source: Soccerway

==== Knockout phase ====
===== Round of 16 =====
Team 1	Agg.	Team 2	1st leg	2nd leg
Milan (Italy)	2–4	(Spain) Barcelona	2–0	0–4
Real Madrid (Spain)	3–2	(England) Manchester United	1–1	2–1
Valencia (Spain)	2–3	(France) Paris Saint-Germain	1–2	1–1
Porto (Portugal)	1–2	(Spain) Málaga	1–0	0–2

===== Quarter-finals =====
Team 1	Agg.	Team 2	1st leg	2nd leg
Málaga (Spain)	2–3	(Germany) Borussia Dortmund	0–0	2–3
Real Madrid (Spain)	5–3	(Turkey) Galatasaray	3–0	2–3
Paris Saint-Germain (France)	3–3 (a)	(Spain) Barcelona	2–2	1–1

===== Semi-finals =====
Team 1	Agg.	Team 2	1st leg	2nd leg
Bayern Munich (Germany)	7–0	(Spain) Barcelona	4–0	3–0
Borussia Dortmund (Germany)	4–3	(Spain) Real Madrid	4–1	0–2

=== UEFA Europa League ===
==== Third qualifying round ====
Team 1	Agg.	Team 2	1st leg	2nd leg
Athletic Bilbao (Spain)	4–3	(Croatia) Slaven Belupo	3–1	1–2

==== Play-off Round ====
Team 1	Agg.	Team 2	1st leg	2nd leg
Athletic Bilbao (Spain)	9–3	(Finland) HJK	6–0	3–3

Team 1	Agg.	Team 2	1st leg	2nd leg
Motherwell (Scotland)	0–3	(Spain) Levante	0–2	0–1

==== Group stage ====
===== Group B =====
Pos	Team	Pld	W	D	L	GF	GA	GD	Pts	Qualification	PLZ	ATL	ACA	HTA
1	(Czech Republic) Viktoria Plzeň	6	4	1	1	11	4	+7	13	Advance to knockout phase	—	1–0	3–1	4–0
2	(Spain) Atlético Madrid	6	4	0	2	7	4	+3	12	Advance to knockout phase	1–0	—	2–1	1–0
3	(Portugal) Académica	6	1	2	3	6	9	−3	5		1–1	2–0	—	1–1
4	(Israel) Hapoel Tel Aviv	6	1	1	4	4	11	−7	4		1–2	0–3	2–0	—

Source: Soccerway

===== Group I =====
Pos	Team	Pld	W	D	L	GF	GA	GD	Pts	Qualification	OL	SPR	ATH	IKS
1	(France) Lyon	6	5	1	0	14	8	+6	16	Advance to knockout phase	—	2–1	2–1	2–0
2	(Czech Republic) Sparta Prague	6	2	3	1	9	6	+3	9	Advance to knockout phase	1–1	—	3–1	3–1
3	(Spain) Athletic Bilbao	6	1	2	3	7	9	−2	5		2–3	0–0	—	1–1
4	(Israel) Ironi Kiryat Shmona	6	0	2	4	6	13	−7	2		3–4	1–1	0–2	—

Source: Soccerway

===== Group L =====
Pos	Team	Pld	W	D	L	GF	GA	GD	Pts	Qualification	HAN	LEV	HEL	TWE
1	(Germany) Hannover 96	6	3	3	0	11	8	+3	12	Advance to knockout phase	—	2–1	3–2	0–0
2	(Spain) Levante	6	3	2	1	10	5	+5	11	Advance to knockout phase	2–2	—	1–0	3–0
3	(Sweden) Helsingborgs IF	6	1	1	4	9	12	−3	4 (Note: Head-to-head points: Helsingborg 4, Twente 1.)		1–2	1–3	—	2–2
4	(Netherlands) Twente	6	0	4	2	5	10	−5	4		2–2	0–0	1–3	—

Source: Soccerway

==== Knockout phase ====
===== Round of 32 =====
Team 1	Agg.	Team 2	1st leg	2nd leg
Atlético Madrid (Spain)	1–2	(Russia) Rubin Kazan	0–2	1–0

Team 1	Agg.	Team 2	1st leg	2nd leg
Levante (Spain)	4–0	(Greece) Olympiacos	3–0	1–0

===== Round of 16 =====
Team 1	Agg.	Team 2	1st leg	2nd leg
Levante (Spain)	0–2	(Russia) Rubin Kazan	0–0	0–2 (aet)

=== UEFA Super Cup ===
==== Final ====
31 August 2012
20:45 CEST

Chelsea (England)	1–4	(Spain) Atlético Madrid
Cahill 75'	Report	Falcao 6', 19', 45'; Miranda 60'

Stade Louis II, Monaco
Attendance: 14,312
Referee: Damir Skomina (Slovenia)
