= 2014–15 CD Tenerife season =

Tenerife
2014–15 season
- President: Miguel Concepción
- Manager: Raül Agné
- Stadium: Heliodoro Rodríguez López
- Segunda División: 16th
- Copa del Rey: Second round
| Home colours | Away colours | Third colours |

The 2014–15 CD Tenerife season is the 102nd season in the club's history.

== Current squad ==
As of 20 August 2014. Note: Flags indicate national team as defined under FIFA eligibility rules; some limited exceptions apply. Players may hold more than one non-FIFA nationality.

| No. | Pos. | Nation | Player |
|---|---|---|---|
| 1 | GK | ESP | Jacobo Sanz (on loan from PAOK) |
| 3 | DF | ESP | Igor Arnáez |
| 4 | DF | ESP | Hugo Álvarez |
| 5 | DF | ESP | Unai Albizua (on loan from Athletic Bilbao) |
| 6 | MF | ESP | Vitolo |
| 7 | MF | ESP | Iker Guarrotxena (on loan from Athletic Bilbao) |
| 8 | MF | ESP | Cristo Martín |
| 9 | FW | ESP | Aridane |
| 10 | MF | ESP | Suso (captain) |
| 11 | FW | URU | Maxi Pérez (on loan from Fénix) |
| 12 | MF | MEX | Ulises Dávila (on loan from Chelsea) |
| 13 | GK | ESP | Roberto |
| 14 | DF | ESP | Carlos Ruiz |

| No. | Pos. | Nation | Player |
|---|---|---|---|
| 16 | DF | ESP | Aitor Sanz |
| 17 | DF | ESP | Javi Moyano |
| 18 | MF | ESP | Ricardo León |
| 19 | FW | URU | Diego Ifrán (on loan from Real Sociedad) |
| 20 | DF | HON | Juan Carlos García (on loan from Wigan Athletic) |
| 21 | DF | ESP | Ayoze Díaz |
| 22 | FW | ARG | Ruso García |
| 23 | DF | ESP | Raúl Cámara |
| 26 | MF | ESP | Jairo |
| 27 | MF | ESP | Quique Rivero |
| 28 | DF | ESP | Jorge Sáenz |
| 29 | FW | ESP | Cristo González |

=== Squad information ===
Note: Flags indicate national team as defined under FIFA eligibility rules; some limited exceptions apply. Players may hold more than one non-FIFA nationality.

| No. | Pos. | Nation | Player |
|---|---|---|---|
| — | DF | ESP | Alberto (at Valencia Mestalla) |
| — | FW | ESP | Nano (at Hospitalet) |

=== Transfers in ===
In:

| No. | Pos. | Nation | Player |
|---|---|---|---|
| — | DF | ESP | Unai Albizua (on loan from Athletic Bilbao) |
| — | FW | ESP | Iker Guarrotxena (on loan from Athletic Bilbao) |
| — | GK | ESP | Jacobo (on loan from PAOK) |
| — | FW | ARG | Cristian García (from Godoy Cruz) |
| — | DF | HON | Juan Carlos García (on loan from Wigan Athletic) |
| — | FW | URU | Diego Ifrán (on loan from Real Sociedad, previously on loan at Deportivo de La Coruña) |
| — | FW | URU | Maxi Pérez (on loan from CA Fénix) |
| — | MF | ESP | Vitolo (from Elazığspor) |

Out:

| No. | Pos. | Nation | Player |
|---|---|---|---|
| — | MF | ESP | Aday Benítez (to Girona) |
| — | DF | ESP | Bruno (to Betis) |
| — | FW | ESP | Juanjo (to Llagostera) |
| — | MF | ESP | Édgar Méndez (loan return to Almería) |
| — | FW | ESP | Ayoze Pérez (to Newcastle United) |

== Competitions ==
=== Overall ===
As of 29 March 2014

| Competition | Started round | Current position/round | Final position | First match | Last match |
|---|---|---|---|---|---|
| Segunda División | — | 16th | — | 23 August 2014 | 6 June 2015 |
| Copa del Rey | Second round | — | Second round | 9 September 2014 | 9 September 2014 |

=== Liga Adelante ===
==== Matches ====
Kickoff times are in CET and CEST

| Round | Date | Time | Opponent | Score | Scorers | Live TV | Stadium | Location | Attendance | Referee |
|---|---|---|---|---|---|---|---|---|---|---|
| 1 | 24 August 2014 | 20:00 | (Spain) SD Ponferradina | 1 - 0 | | | El Toralín | Ponferrada, Castile and León, Spain | 4,500 | José Piñeiro (Spain) |
| 2 | 30 August 2014 | 22:00 | (Spain) Albacete Balompié | 1 - 1 | Aridane 59' | | Heliodoro Rodríguez López | Tenerife, Canary Islands, Spain | 7,785 | Valentín Pizarro (Spain) |
| 3 | 6 September 2014 | 20:00 | (Spain) Girona FC | 2 - 0 | | | Montilivi | Girona, Catalonia, Spain | 2,934 | Dámaso Arcediano (Spain) |
| 4 | 14 September 2014 | 20:00 | (Spain) CD Mirandés | 1 - 0 | Guarrotxena 7' | | Heliodoro Rodríguez López | Tenerife, Canary Islands, Spain | 8,175 | David Medié (Spain) |
| 5 | 21 September 2014 | 17:00 | (Spain) Real Valladolid | | | | José Zorrilla | Valladolid, Castile and León, Spain | 10,251 |
| 6 | 28 September 2014 | 18:00 | (Spain) UD Las Palmas | | | | Heliodoro Rodríguez López | Tenerife, Canary Islands, Spain | 3,100 |
| 7 | 5 October 2014 | 20:00 | (Spain) CD Leganés | | | | Butarque | Leganés, Madrid, Spain | 8,155 |
| 8 | 11 October 2014 | 20:00 | (Spain) Recreativo Huelva | | | | Heliodoro Rodríguez López | Tenerife, Canary Islands, Spain | 8,155 |
| 9 | 18 October 2014 | 20:00 | (Spain) CA Osasuna | | | | El Sadar | Pamplona, Navarre, Spain | 13,063 |
| 10 | 26 October 2014 | 20:00 | (Spain) FC Barcelona B | | | | Heliodoro Rodríguez López | Tenerife, Canary Islands, Spain | 9,062 |
| 11 | 3 November 2014 | 21:00 | (Spain) Real Zaragoza | | | | La Romareda | Zaragoza, Aragon, Spain |
| 12 | 9 November 2014 | 19:00 | (Spain) Deportivo Alavés | | | | Heliodoro Rodríguez López | Tenerife, Canary Islands, Spain |
| 13 | 16 November 2014 | 19:00 | (Spain) UE Llagostera | | | | Palamós Costa Brava | Llagostera, Catalonia, Spain |
| 14 | 22 November 2014 | 20:00 | (Spain) RCD Mallorca | | | | Heliodoro Rodríguez López | Tenerife, Canary Islands, Spain |
| 15 | 30 November 2014 | 19:00 | (Spain) CD Lugo | | | | Anxo Carro | Lugo, Galicia, Spain |
| 16 | 7 December 2014 | 19:00 | (Spain) Racing Santander | | | | Heliodoro Rodríguez López | Tenerife, Canary Islands, Spain |
| 17 | 14 December 2014 | 19:00 | (Spain) AD Alcorcón | | | | Santo Domingo | Alcorcón, Madrid, Spain |
| 18 | 20 December 2014 | 20:00 | (Spain) CE Sabadell | | | | Heliodoro Rodríguez López | Tenerife, Canary Islands, Spain |
| 19 | 4 January 2015 | 19:00 | (Spain) Sporting Gijón | | | | Heliodoro Rodríguez López | Tenerife, Canary Islands, Spain |
| 20 | 10 January 2015 | 20:00 | (Spain) Real Betis | | | | Benito Villamarín | Seville, Andalusia, Spain |
| 21 | 18 January 2015 | 19:00 | (Spain) CD Numancia | | | | Heliodoro Rodríguez López | Tenerife, Canary Islands, Spain |
| 22 | 24 January 2015 | 20:00 | (Spain) SD Ponferradina | | | | Heliodoro Rodríguez López | Tenerife, Canary Islands, Spain |
| 23 | 31 January 2015 | 18:00 | (Spain) Albacete Balompié | | | | Carlos Belmonte | Albacete, Castilla-La Mancha, Spain |
| 24 | 8 February 2015 | 19:00 | (Spain) Girona FC | | | | Heliodoro Rodríguez López | Tenerife, Canary Islands, Spain |
| 25 | 14 February 2015 | 21:00 | (Spain) CD Mirandés | | Sanz 30' | | Anduva | Miranda de Ebro, Castile and León, Spain | 2,513 |
| 26 | 22 February 2015 | 19:00 | (Spain) Real Valladolid | | | | Estadio Heliodoro Rodríguez López | Tenerife, Canary Islands, Spain | 9,112 |
| 27 | 1 March 2015 | 13:00 | (Spain) UD Las Palmas | 1 - 1 | Pérez 48' | | Gran Canaria | Las Palmas, Canary Islands, Spain | 28,032 | David Medié (Spain) |
| 28 | 7 March 2015 | 20:00 | (Spain) CD Leganés | 1 - 0 | Pérez 66' | | Heliodoro Rodríguez López | Leganés, Madrid, Spain | 9,504 | Jorge Valdéz (Spain) |
| 29 | 14 March 2015 | 20:00 | (Spain) Recreativo Huelva | 1 - 1 | Ifrán 4' | | Nuevo Colombino | Huelva, Andalusia, Spain | 5,932 | Ricardo de Burgos Bengoetxea (Spain) |
| 30 | 22 March 2015 | 19:00 | (Spain) CA Osasuna | 2 - 1 | Ifrán 35', Pérez 85' | | Heliodoro Rodríguez López | Tenerife, Canary Islands, Spain | 7,308 | José María Sánchez Martínez (Spain) |
| 31 | 29 March 2015 | 19:00 | (Spain) FC Barcelona B | 2 - 2 | Ifrán 13', Pérez 60' | LaLiga TV, LAOLA1 TV, | Mini Estadi | Barcelona, Catalonia, Spain | 5,495 | Francisco Arias (Spain) |
| 32 | 4 April 2015 | 18:00 | (Spain) Real Zaragoza | | | | Heliodoro Rodríguez López | Tenerife, Canary Islands, Spain |
| 33 | 11 April 2015 | 19:00 | (Spain) Deportivo Alavés |
| 34 | 18 April 2015 | --:-- | (Spain) UE Llagostera |
| 35 | 25 April 2015 | --:-- | (Spain) RCD Mallorca |
| 36 | 2 May 2015 | --:-- | (Spain) CD Lugo |
| 37 | 9 May 2015 | --:-- | (Spain) Racing Santander |
| 38 | 16 May 2015 | --:-- | (Spain) AD Alcorcon |
| 39 | 19 May 2015 | --:-- | (Spain) CE Sabadell |
| 40 | 23 May 2015 | --:-- | (Spain) Sporting Gijón |
| 41 | 30 May 2015 | --:-- | (Spain) Real Betis |
| 42 | 6 June 2015 | --:-- | (Spain) CD Numancia |

==== Results by round ====
| Round | 1 | 2 | 3 | 4 | 5 | 6 | 7 | 8 | 9 | 10 | 11 | 12 | 13 | 14 | 15 | 16 | 17 | 18 | 19 | 20 | 21 | 22 | 23 | 24 | 25 | 26 | 27 | 28 | 29 | 30 | 31 | 32 | 33 | 34 | 35 | 36 | 37 | 38 | 39 | 40 | 41 | 42 |
|---|---|---|---|---|---|---|---|---|---|---|---|---|---|---|---|---|---|---|---|---|---|---|---|---|---|---|---|---|---|---|---|---|---|---|---|---|---|---|---|---|---|---|
| Ground | A | H | A | H | A | H | A | H | A | H | A | H | A | H | A | H | A | H | H | A | H | H | A | H | A | H | A | H | A | H | A | H | A | H | A | H | A | H | A | A | H | A |
| Result | L | D | L | W | L | W | L | L | L | W | W | D | L | D | L | W | D | W | D | L | D | L | L | L | D | W | D | W | D | W | D | | | | | | | | | | | |
| Position | 19 | 18 | 20 | 16 | 18 | 15 | 20 | 20 | 21 | 17 | 16 | 16 | 17 | 17 | 19 | 16 | 18 | 15 | 16 | 16 | 15 | 16 | 19 | 20 | 19 | 17 | 18 | 16 | 16 | 16 | 16 | | | | | | | | | | | |

Updated to match(es) played on 29 March 2015. Source: Competitive matches
A = Away; H = Home; W = Win; D = Draw; L = Loss

==== Results summary ====
| Overall | | | | | | | | Home | | | | | | Away | | | | | |
| Pld | W | D | L | GF | GA | GD | Pts | W | D | L | GF | GA | GD | W | D | L | GF | GA | GD |
|---|---|---|---|---|---|---|---|---|---|---|---|---|---|---|---|---|---|---|---|
| 31 | 9 | 10 | 12 | 29 | 35 | −6 | 37 | 8 | 5 | 3 | 15 | 9 | +6 | 1 | 5 | 9 | 14 | 26 | −12 |

Last updated: 29 March 2015.
Source: Competitive matches

==== League table ====
| Pos | Team | Pld | W | D | L | GF | GA | GD | Pts | Promotion, qualification or relegation |
|---|---|---|---|---|---|---|---|---|---|---|
| 15 | Lugo | 42 | 11 | 16 | 15 | 48 | 56 | −8 | 49 | |
| 16 | Mallorca | 42 | 13 | 9 | 20 | 51 | 64 | −13 | 48 (Note: Mallorca ahead on head-to-head record; Mallorca-Tenerife 2-1, Tenerife-Mallorca 0-0) | |
| 17 | Tenerife | 42 | 11 | 15 | 16 | 41 | 48 | −7 | 48 | |
| 18 | Osasuna | 42 | 11 | 12 | 19 | 41 | 60 | −19 | 45 | |
| 19 | Racing Santander (R) | 42 | 12 | 8 | 22 | 42 | 53 | −11 | 44 | Relegation to Segunda División B |

Source: LFP - Liga Adelante
Rules for classification: 1) points; 2) head-to-head points; 3) head-to-head goal difference; 4) goal difference; 5) number of goals scored
(R) Relegated
