= 2005–06 Recreativo de Huelva season =

Recreativo de Huelva
2005–06 season
- Manager: Marcelino
- Stadium: Estadio Nuevo Colombino
- Segunda División: 1st
- Copa del Rey: Second round
- Top goalscorer: League: Ikechukwu Uche (20); All: Ikechukwu Uche (20)

The 2005–06 season was Recreativo de Huelva's 117th season in existence and the club's third consecutive season in the second division of Spanish football. In addition to the domestic league, Recreativo de Huelva participated in this season's edition of the Copa del Rey. The season covered the period from 1 July 2005 to 30 June 2006. The club won the league for the first time ever and thus promoted to the La Liga.

== Transfers ==
=== In ===
No.	Pos	Player	Transferred from	Fee	Date	Source
15			TBD		1 July 2005	

=== Out ===
No.	Pos	Player	Transferred to	Fee	Date	Source
15			TBD		1 July 2005	

== Pre-season and friendlies ==
Win Draw Loss

== Competitions ==
=== Overview ===
Competition	First match	Last match	Starting round	Final position	Record							
Competition	First match	Last match	Starting round	Final position	Pld	W	D	L	GF	GA	GD	Win %
Segunda División	27 August 2005	17 June 2006	Matchday 1	Winners	42	22	12	8	67	32	+35	52.38
Copa del Rey	31 August 2005	14 September 2005	Round of 64	Second round	2	1	0	1	3	4	−1	50.00
Total					44	23	12	9	70	36	+34	52.27

Source: Competitions

=== Segunda División ===
==== League table ====
Pos	Team	Pld	W	D	L	GF	GA	GD	Pts	Promotion or relegation
1	Recreativo (C, P)	42	22	12	8	67	32	+35	78	Promotion to La Liga
2	Gimnàstic (P)	42	23	7	12	48	38	+10	76	Promotion to La Liga
3	Levante (P)	42	20	14	8	53	39	+14	74	Promotion to La Liga
4	Ciudad de Murcia	42	20	12	10	53	42	+11	72	
5	Lorca Deportiva	42	19	12	11	56	39	+17	69	

Source: BDFutbol
Rules for classification: 1st points; 2nd head-to-head points; 3rd head-to-head goal difference; 4th head-to-head goals scored; 5th goal difference; 6th number of goals scored; 7th Fair-play points
(C) Champions; (P) Promoted

==== Results summary ====
Overall								Home						Away					
Pld	W	D	L	GF	GA	GD	Pts	W	D	L	GF	GA	GD	W	D	L	GF	GA	GD
0	0	0	0	0	0	0	0	0	0	0	0	0	0	0	0	0	0	0	0

==== Results by round ====
Round	1	2	3	4	5	6	7	8	9	10	11	12	13	14	15	16	17	18	19	20	21	22	23	24	25	26	27	28	29	30	31	32	33	34	35	36	37	38	39	40	41	42
Ground	A	H	A	H	A	H	A	H	A	H	A	H	A	H	H	A	H	A	H	A	H	H	A	H	A	H	A	H	A	H	A	H	A	H	A	A	H	A	H	A	H	A
Result	L	W	D	W	L	W	W	D	W	W	W	D	D	W	D	W	W	L	D	D	W	W	L	D	W	D	L	W	D	W	D	W	L	W	W	W	W	L	D	W	L	W
Position																																										

A = Away; H = Home; W = Win; D = Draw; L = Loss

==== Matches ====
27 August 2005 1	Ciudad de Murcia	3–1	Recreativo	Murcia
CEST (UTC+2)

3 September 2005 2	Recreativo	3–1	Tenerife	Huelva
CEST (UTC+2)				Stadium: Nuevo Colombino

11 September 2005 3	Sporting Gijón	1–1	Recreativo	Gijón
CEST (UTC+2)

18 September 2005 4	Recreativo	2–0	Valladolid	Huelva
CEST (UTC+2)				Stadium: Nuevo Colombino

24 September 2005 5	Eibar	2–1	Recreativo	Eibar
CEST (UTC+2)

2 October 2005 6	Recreativo	2–1	Lorca Deportiva	Huelva
CEST (UTC+2)				Stadium: Nuevo Colombino

9 October 2005 7	Levante	1–3	Recreativo	Valencia
CEST (UTC+2)

15 October 2005 8	Recreativo	2–2	Polideportivo Ejido	Huelva
CEST (UTC+2)				Stadium: Nuevo Colombino

23 October 2005 9	Racing Ferrol	0–3	Recreativo	Ferrol
CEST (UTC+2)

30 October 2005 10	Recreativo	2–0	Elche	Huelva
CEST (UTC+2)				Stadium: Nuevo Colombino

6 November 2005 11	Murcia	0–2	Recreativo	Murcia
CEST (UTC+2)

12 November 2005 12	Recreativo	1–1	Albacete	Huelva
CEST (UTC+2)				Stadium: Nuevo Colombino

20 November 2005 13	Gimnàstic	0–0	Recreativo	Tarragona
CEST (UTC+2)

27 November 2005 14	Recreativo	3–2	Lleida	Huelva
CEST (UTC+2)				Stadium: Nuevo Colombino

4 December 2005 15	Recreativo	0–0	Málaga B	Huelva
CEST (UTC+2)				Stadium: Nuevo Colombino

10 December 2005 16	Real Madrid Castilla	1–2	Recreativo	Madrid
CEST (UTC+2)

18 December 2005 17	Recreativo	2–0	Almería	Huelva
CEST (UTC+2)				Stadium: Nuevo Colombino

22 December 2005 18	Castellón	2–0	Recreativo	Castellón de la Plana
CEST (UTC+2)

8 January 2006 19	Recreativo	1–1	Numancia	Huelva
CEST (UTC+2)				Stadium: Nuevo Colombino

15 January 2006 20	Xerez	1–1	Recreativo	Jerez de la Frontera
CEST (UTC+2)

22 January 2006 21	Recreativo	1–0	Hércules	Huelva
CEST (UTC+2)				Stadium: Nuevo Colombino

29 January 2006 22	Recreativo	1–0	Ciudad de Murcia	Huelva
CEST (UTC+2)				Stadium: Nuevo Colombino

4 February 2006 23	Tenerife	1–0	Recreativo	Santa Cruz de Tenerife
CEST (UTC+2)

12 February 2006 24	Recreativo	0–0	Sporting Gijón	Huelva
CEST (UTC+2)				Stadium: Nuevo Colombino

19 February 2006 25	Valladolid	0–1	Recreativo	Valladolid
CEST (UTC+2)

25 February 2006 26	Recreativo	0–0	Eibar	Huelva
CEST (UTC+2)				Stadium: Nuevo Colombino

5 March 2006 27	Lorca Deportiva	2–1	Recreativo	Lorca
CEST (UTC+2)

12 March 2006 28	Recreativo	4–1	Levante	Huelva
CEST (UTC+2)				Stadium: Nuevo Colombino

18 March 2006 29	Polideportivo Ejido	0–0	Recreativo	El Ejido
CEST (UTC+2)

26 March 2006 30	Recreativo	3–0	Racing Ferrol	Huelva
CEST (UTC+2)				Stadium: Nuevo Colombino

2 April 2006 31	Elche	1–1	Recreativo	Elche
CEST (UTC+2)

9 April 2006 32	Recreativo	1–0	Murcia	Huelva
CEST (UTC+2)				Stadium: Nuevo Colombino

15 April 2006 33	Albacete	1–0	Recreativo	Albacete
CEST (UTC+2)

23 April 2006 34	Recreativo	3–0	Gimnàstic	Huelva
CEST (UTC+2)				Stadium: Nuevo Colombino

30 April 2006 35	Lleida	0–4	Recreativo	Lleida
CEST (UTC+2)

7 May 2006 36	Málaga B	0–2	Recreativo	Málaga
CEST (UTC+2)

13 May 2006 37	Recreativo	4–1	Real Madrid Castilla	Huelva
CEST (UTC+2)				Stadium: Nuevo Colombino

21 May 2006 38	Almería	2–1	Recreativo	Almería
CEST (UTC+2)

28 May 2006 39	Recreativo	2–2	Castellón	Huelva
CEST (UTC+2)				Stadium: Nuevo Colombino

4 June 2006 40	Numancia	0–3	Recreativo	Soria
CEST (UTC+2)

10 June 2006 41	Recreativo	1–2	Xerez	Huelva
CEST (UTC+2)				Stadium: Nuevo Colombino

18 June 2006 42	Hércules	0–2	Recreativo	Alicante
CEST (UTC+2)

=== Copa del Rey ===
31 August 2005 First round	Recreativo	3–2	Elche	Huelva
CEST (UTC+2)				Stadium: Nuevo Colombino

14 September 2005 Second round	Alicante	2–0	Recreativo	Alicante
CEST (UTC+2)				Stadium: Estadio Alicante CF
