= Hugo Álvarez =

Hugo Álvarez may refer to:

- Hugo Álvarez (footballer, born 1985), Spanish retired football centre-back
- Hugo Álvarez (footballer, born 2003), Spanish football midfielder
