= Cristo González =

Spanish footballer (born 1997)

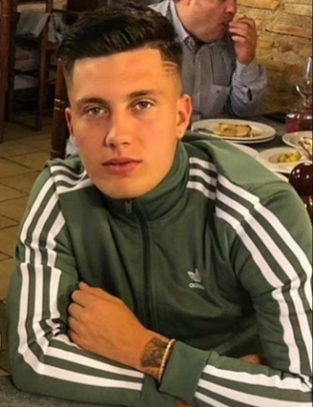
- González in 2017

Personal information
- Full name: Cristo Ramón González Pérez
- Date of birth: 24 October 1997 (age 29)
- Place of birth: Santa Cruz de Tenerife, Spain
- Height: 1.79 m (5 ft 10 in)
- Position: Forward

Team information
- Current team: Umm Salal (on loan from Al Sadd)
- Number: 33

Youth career
- 2005–2007: CD Tablero
- 2007–2008: CD Laurel
- 2008–2014: Tenerife

Senior career*
Years	Team	Apps	(Gls)
2014–2015	Tenerife B	9	(1)
2014–2017	Tenerife	50	(5)
2017–2019	Real Madrid B	70	(32)
2018–2019	Real Madrid	1	(0)
2019–2023	Udinese	0	(0)
2019–2020	→ Huesca (loan)	26	(5)
2020–2021	→ Mirandés (loan)	20	(4)
2021–2022	→ Valladolid (loan)	29	(2)
2022–2023	→ Sporting Gijón (loan)	34	(5)
2023–2024	Arouca	36	(15)
2024–	Al Sadd	10	(3)
2025–	→ Umm Salal (loan)	20	(6)

International career
2015	Spain U19	1	(0)
- * Club domestic league appearances and goals as of 11:45, 17 July 2026 (UTC)

Cristo Ramón González Pérez (born 24 October 1997) is a Spanish professional footballer who plays as a forward for Qatar Stars League club Umm Salal, on loan from Al Sadd.

== Club career ==
=== Tenerife ===
Born in Santa Cruz de Tenerife, Canary Islands, González finished his youth career at CD Tenerife. He later appeared with their first team in the 2014 pre-season, being also called up to the match against SD Ponferradina on 22 August 2014.

On 24 August 2014, before even having represented the B side, González played his first match as a professional, coming on as a substitute for Iker Guarrotxena in the 62nd minute of a 1–0 away loss to Ponferradina in the Segunda División. and thus becoming the second-youngest debutant for the club. He scored his first goal in the competition on 31 January of the following year, but in a 3–2 away defeat against Albacete Balompié.

=== Real Madrid ===
González signed with Real Madrid on 25 July 2017, being assigned to the reserves in the Segunda División B. He made his competitive debut for the first team on 31 October 2018, replacing Marco Asensio and scoring the final goal in the 4–0 victory at UD Melilla in the round of 32 of the Copa del Rey. His maiden La Liga appearance took place the following 13 January, when he played the entire second half of a 2–1 away defeat of Real Betis after coming on for the injured Karim Benzema.

=== Udinese ===
On 19 July 2019, González signed a five-year contract with Udinese Calcio of the Italian Serie A. On 13 August, however, he returned to his home country after agreeing to a one-year loan deal at SD Huesca, scoring six competitive goals during his spell for the second-division champions.

González played his first official game for Udinese on 28 October 2020, coming off the bench in a 3–1 win over L.R. Vicenza Virtus in the third round of the Coppa Italia. He returned to the Spanish second tier on 10 December, joining CD Mirandés on loan until the end of the season.

On 28 August 2021, González moved to Real Valladolid on loan for the upcoming campaign. In July 2022, also on loan, he joined Sporting de Gijón also of division two with an option to buy.

=== Arouca ===
On 1 July 2023, González signed a two-year contract with Portuguese Primeira Liga club F.C. Arouca. In February 2024, having scored 11 goals and provided five assists in 28 appearances in all competitions, he extended his link until 2026.

== Career statistics ==
As of match played 18 May 2024

Club	Season	League			National cup		League cup		Continental		Other		Total	
Club	Season	Division	Apps	Goals	Apps	Goals	Apps	Goals	Apps	Goals	Apps	Goals	Apps	Goals
Tenerife B	2014–15	Tercera División	9	1	—		—		—		—		9	1
Tenerife	2014–15	Segunda División	5	1	1	0	—		—		—		6	1
Tenerife	2015–16	Segunda División	24	1	0	0	—		—		—		24	1
Tenerife	2016–17	Segunda División	21	3	2	1	—		—		—		23	4
Tenerife	Total		50	5	3	1	—		—		—		53	6
Real Madrid B	2017–18	Segunda División B	35	11	—		—		—		—		35	11
Real Madrid B	2018–19	Segunda División B	35	21	—		—		—		2 (Note: Appearances in Segunda División B play-offs)	0	37	21
Real Madrid B	Total		70	32	—		—		—		2	0	72	32
Real Madrid	2018–19	La Liga	1	0	3	1	—		0	0	0	0	4	1
Huesca (loan)	2019–20	Segunda División	26	5	1	1	—		—		—		27	6
Udinese	2020–21	Serie A	0	0	1	0	—		—		—		1	0
Udinese	2021–22	Serie A	0	0	1	0	—		—		—		1	0
Udinese	Total		0	0	2	0	—		—		—		2	0
Mirandés (loan)	2020–21	Segunda División	20	4	0	0	—		—		—		20	4
Valladolid (loan)	2021–22	Segunda División	29	2	3	0	—		—		—		32	2
Sporting Gijón (loan)	2022–23	Segunda División	34	5	3	1	—		—		—		37	6
Arouca	2023–24	Primeira Liga	34	15	3	1	3	1	2 (Note: Appearances in UEFA Europa Conference League)	1	—		42	18
Career total			273	69	17	5	3	1	3	1	2	0	298	76

== Honours ==
Huesca

- Segunda División: 2019–20
