= Teresa Herrera =

Philanthropist

Teresa Herrera (1712–1791), was a Spanish philanthropist. She was the founder of the first hospital in town, the Hospital de la Caridad in A Coruña (1791).

A street is named after her, as well as the hospital Hospital Materno Infantil Teresa Herrera, and the awards Teresa Herrera Trophy (1946), Teresa Herrera Pennant (1986) and the Teresa Herrera Trophy (padel) (2007) were all made in memory of her.
