= Maximiliano Pérez =

Uruguayan footballer (born 1986)

Maxi Pérez
Personal information
- Full name: Maximiliano Daniel Pérez Tambasco
- Date of birth: 26 October 1986 (age 40)
- Place of birth: Buenos Aires, Argentina
- Height: 1.78 m (5 ft 10 in)
- Position: Forward

Youth career
- Fénix

Senior career*
Years	Team	Apps	(Gls)
2006–2016	Fénix	126	(50)
2008	→ Rosario Central (loan)	0	(0)
2008	→ Defensor Sporting (loan)	8	(3)
2009	→ Rangers (loan)	12	(5)
2009	→ Everton (loan)	18	(2)
2010	→ San Martín SJ (loan)	1	(0)
2011–2012	→ Peñarol (loan)	19	(3)
2012–2013	→ Necaxa (loan)	3	(0)
2014–2015	→ Tenerife (loan)	28	(5)
2016	Olimpo	4	(0)
2017–2019	Fénix	61	(21)
2020	Montevideo Wanderers	26	(3)
2021	Cerrito	18	(1)
2022	Miramar Misiones	9	(0)
Total		333	(93)
- * Club domestic league appearances and goals

Maximiliano 'Maxi' Daniel Pérez Tambasco (born October 26, 1986, in Buenos Aires) is a former Argentine naturalized Uruguayan footballer who played as a forward.

== Career ==
A product of Fénix, Pérez also played in Argentina, Chile, Mexico and Spain.

== Personal life ==
Born in Buenos Aires, Argentina, Pérez naturalized Uruguayan at age 18.
