= Trofeo Colombino =

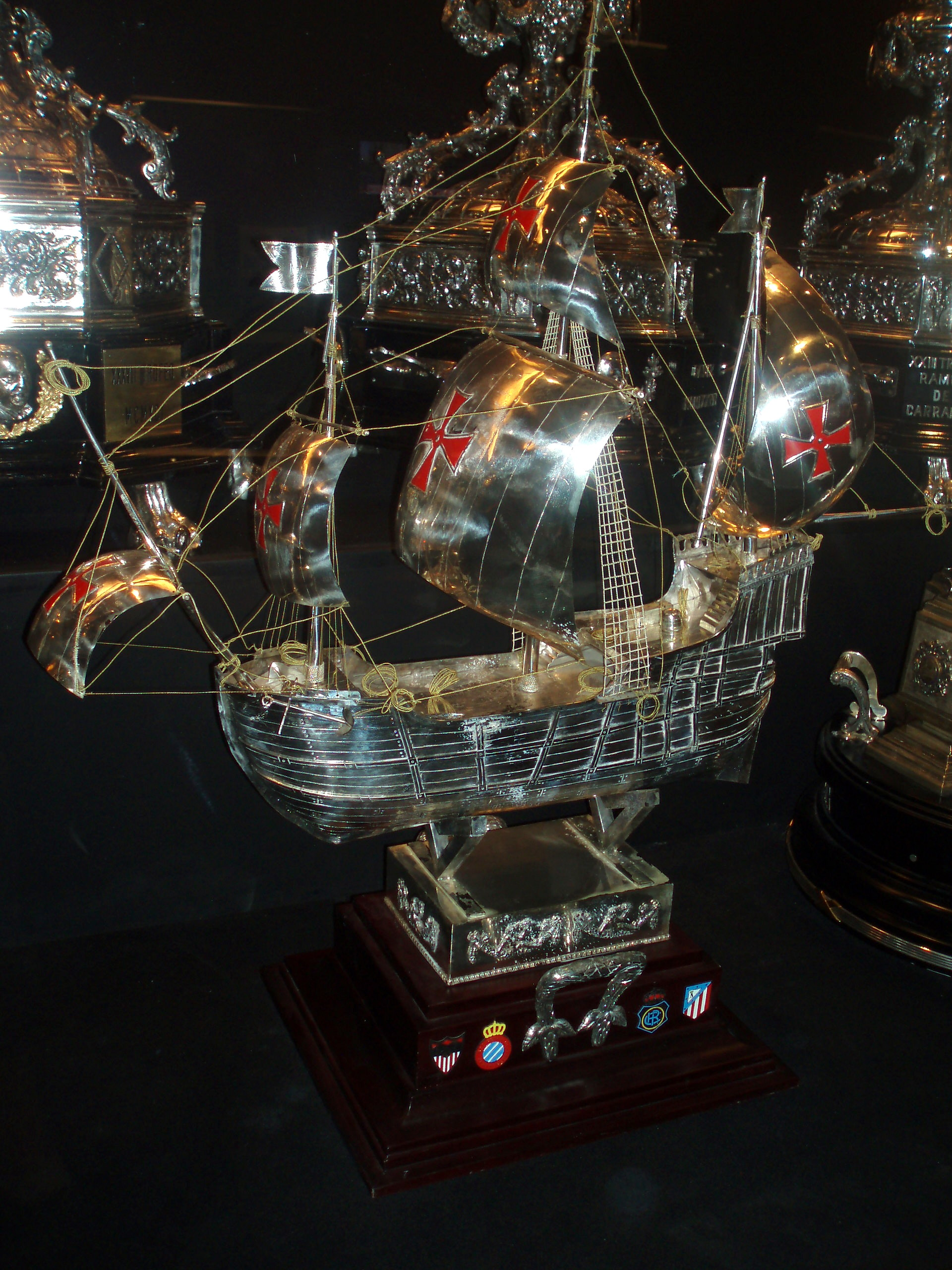
- Trofeo Colombino Trophy on display at the Atlético Madrid museum
- Organiser(s): Recreativo de Huelva
- Founded: 6 August 1965; 61 years ago
- Region: Huelva, Spain
- Teams: 2 or 3 or 4
- Current champions: (Spain) Real Betis (2026)
- Most championships: (Spain) Recreativo de Huelva (14 titles)
- Broadcaster: LaSexta

Trofeo Colombino is a summer football tournament hosted annually by Recreativo de Huelva at its home ground, the Estadio Nuevo Colombino in Huelva, Spain. The tournament is held in honor of Recre's status as the oldest surviving football club in Spain and has been held since 1965. Recreativo has won the tournament more times than any other club; the current champions are Real Betis.

== History ==
The tournament was established in 1965 as a summer competition to commemorate Recreativo de Huelva, the oldest surviving football club in Spain, which was founded on 18 December 1889. The Estadio Nuevo Colombino has hosted the tournament since 2001. The winner is awarded a silver caravel trophy. It is considered one of the most prestigious summer football tournaments in Spain, alongside the Teresa Herrera Trophy, Ramón de Carranza Trophy and Santiago Bernabéu Trophy.

The host club, Recreativo de Huelva has won the tournament 14 times and has also lost the most finals, with 20 defeats.

== List of champions ==
Year	Champion	Second	Third	Fourth
1965	(Spain) Recreativo	(Italy) Genoa	Racing Club de France	–
1966	(Spain) Atlético Madrid	(Spain) Recreativo	(France) Reims	(Portugal) Os Belenenses
1967	(Spain) Recreativo	(Spain) Sevilla	(Portugal) Vitoria Setubal	(France) Lyon
1968	(Spain) Real Betis	(Spain) Recreativo	(Brazil) Atlético Mineiro	(Morocco) FAR Rabat
1969	(Brazil) São Paulo	(Spain) Real Madrid	(Belgium) Anderlecht	(Spain) Las Palmas
1970	(Spain) Real Madrid	(Soviet Union) Spartak Moscow	(Belgium) Standard Liège	(Spain) Sevilla
1971	(Hungary) Újpesti Dózsa	(Soviet Union) CSKA Moscow	(Spain) Real Madrid	(Spain) Real Betis
1972	(Spain) Atlético Madrid	(Czechoslovakia) Slovan Bratislava	(Brazil) Fluminense	(Spain) Valencia
1973	(Soviet Union) Dinamo Tbilisi	(Portugal) Benfica	(England) Derby County	(Spain) Atlético Madrid
1974	(Netherlands) Feyenoord	(Hungary) Újpesti Dózsa	(Spain) Real Betis	(West Germany) Bayern Munich
1975	(Spain) Sevilla	(Spain) Athletic Bilbao	(Argentina) River Plate	(Soviet Union) Dinamo Tbilisi
1976	(Socialist Federal Republic of Yugoslavia) Partizán	(Spain) Atlético Madrid	(England) Manchester City	(Spain) Real Betis
1977	(Spain) Recreativo	(Hungary) Honved Budapest	(Hungary) Újpesti Dózsa	(Spain) Real Sociedad
1978	(Poland) Stal Mielec	(Romania) Dinamo București	(Spain) Sevilla	(Spain) Recreativo
1979	(Spain) Recreativo	(Belgium) Beveren	(Spain) Real Betis	(Poland) Stal Mielec
1980	(Brazil) Vasco da Gama	(Spain) Recreativo	(Spain) Espanyol	(Socialist Federal Republic of Yugoslavia) Dinamo Zagreb
1981	(Spain) Athletic Bilbao	(Spain) Barcelona	(Spain) Atlético Madrid	(Spain) Recreativo
1982	(England) Nottingham Forest	(Spain) Recreativo	(Spain) Sevilla	(Spain) Athletic Bilbao
1983	(Spain) Real Betis	(Mexico) América	(Brazil) América-RJ	(Spain) Recreativo
1984	(Spain) Real Madrid	(Spain) Recreativo	(Spain) Real Betis	(Spain) Málaga
1985	(Spain) Sevilla	(Spain) Atlético Madrid	(Brazil) Botafogo	(Spain) Recreativo
1986	(Spain) Recreativo	(England) Manchester City	(Spain) Barcelona	(Spain) Sevilla
1987	(Spain) Recreativo	(Portugal) Benfica	(Spain) Espanyol	(Spain) Real Betis
1988	(Brazil) Flamengo	(Spain) Recreativo	(Brazil) Cruzeiro	(Spain) Zaragoza
1989	(Spain) Real Madrid	(Soviet Union) Spartak Moscow	(Spain) Real Betis	(Spain) Recreativo
1990	(Spain) Athletic Bilbao	(Spain) Recreativo	(Spain) Atlético Madrid	(Spain) Real Betis
1991	(Spain) Atlético Madrid	(Spain) Sevilla	(Spain) Recreativo	(Soviet Union) Spartak Moscow
1992	Chile	(Portugal) Benfica	Uruguay	(Spain) Recreativo
1993	(Spain) Atlético Madrid	(Italy) Sampdoria	(Brazil) São Paulo	(Spain) Sevilla
1994	(Spain) Zaragoza	(Spain) Real Betis	(Spain) Atlético Madrid	–
1995	(Spain) Real Betis	(Spain) Mérida	(Spain) Recreativo	–
1996	(Spain) Sevilla	(Spain) Recreativo	(Spain) Valladolid	(Spain) Real Betis
1997	(Brazil) Grêmio	(Spain) Sevilla	(Spain) Zaragoza	(Spain) Recreativo
1998	(Spain) Recreativo	(Spain) Real Sociedad	(Spain) Real Betis	(Greece) Olympiakos
1999	(Spain) Athletic Bilbao	(Spain) Málaga	(Spain) Recreativo	(Netherlands) Eindhoven
2000	(Spain) Recreativo	(Spain) Real Betis	(Spain) Las Palmas	(Spain) Málaga
2001	(Spain) Celta Vigo	(Spain) Tenerife	(Spain) Recreativo	(Spain) Osasuna
2002	(Spain) Atlético Madrid	(Spain) Recreativo	(Spain) Sevilla	(Spain) Espanyol
2003	(Spain) Recreativo	(Spain) Málaga	(Spain) Sevilla	(Greece) Panathinaikos
2004	(Spain) Recreativo	(Spain) Málaga	(Spain) Real Sociedad	(Spain) Real Betis
2005	(Spain) Sevilla	(Spain) Recreativo	(Spain) Athletic Bilbao	–
2006	(Portugal) Sporting	(Spain) Recreativo	(Spain) Sevilla	(England) Bolton Wanderers
2007	(Italy) Parma	(Spain) Recreativo	(Spain) Real Zaragoza	–
2008	(Spain) Recreativo	(Spain) Athletic Bilbao	(Spain) Málaga	–
2009	(Spain) Real Betis	(Spain) Real Zaragoza	(Spain) Recreativo	–
2010	(Spain) Recreativo	(Spain) Sporting Gijón	(Spain) Atlético Madrid	(Uruguay) Montevideo Wanderers
2011	(Spain) Atlético Madrid	(Spain) Recreativo	–	–
2012	(Spain) Getafe	(Spain) Recreativo	(Portugal) Sporting	(Morocco) Atlético Tetuán
2013	(Spain) Levante	(Italy) Pescara	(Spain) Recreativo	(Portugal) Olhanense
2014	(Spain) Barcelona	(Spain) Recreativo	–	–
2015	(Spain) Real Betis	(Spain) Recreativo	–	–
2016	(Spain) Recreativo	(Spain) Córdoba	(Spain) Real Betis	–
2017	(Spain) Recreativo	(Spain) Getafe	–	–
2018	Not played			
2019	(Spain) Osasuna	(Spain) Recreativo	–	–
2020–2023	Not played			
2024	(Spain) Córdoba	(Spain) Recreativo	–	–
2025	(Spain) Zamora	(Spain) Recreativo	(Spain) Cacereño	–
2026	(Spain) Real Betis	(Spain) Recreativo	–	–

== Titles by club ==
Club	Champions	Runners-up	Years
(Spain) Recreativo	14	20	1965, 1967, 1977, 1979, 1986, 1987, 1998, 2000, 2003, 2004, 2008, 2010, 2016, 2017
(Spain) Atlético Madrid	6	2	1966, 1972, 1991, 1993, 2002, 2011
(Spain) Real Betis	6	2	1968, 1983, 1995, 2009, 2015, 2026
(Spain) Sevilla	4	2	1975, 1985, 1996, 2005
(Spain) Athletic Bilbao	3	2	1981, 1990, 1999
(Spain) Real Madrid	3	1	1970, 1984, 1989
The rest of the clubs (1 each)	21	28	–
TOTAL	57	57	–

== See also ==
- Ramón de Carranza Trophy
- Santiago Bernabéu Trophy
- Teresa Herrera Trophy
