= José Manuel Alcañiz =

Spanish footballer (born 1990)

Personal information
- Full name: José Manuel Alcañiz Andreu
- Date of birth: 12 July 1990 (age 36)
- Place of birth: Madrid, Spain
- Height: 1.78 m (5 ft 10 in)
- Position: Centre back

Team information
- Current team: Quintanar del Rey

Youth career
- –2008: Rayo Vallecano

Senior career*
Years	Team	Apps	(Gls)
2008–2013	Rayo Vallecano B	158	(4)
2011	Rayo Vallecano	2	(0)
2013–2014	Fuenlabrada	32	(0)
2014–2015	Compostela	33	(0)
2015–2016	Sabadell	22	(2)
2016–2017	Socuéllamos	26	(1)
2017–2018	Guadalajara	29	(1)
2018–2019	Zamora	35	(0)
2019–	Quintanar del Rey	26	(0)
- * Club domestic league appearances and goals as of 8 March 2020

José Manuel Alcañiz Andreu (born 12 July 1990) is a Spanish footballer who plays as a central defender for Spanish club Quintanar del Rey.

== Club career ==
Born in Madrid, Alcañiz graduated from local Rayo Vallecano's youth system, making his senior debuts with the reserves in the 2008–09 season, in the Tercera División. On 16 April 2011, he played his first game as a professional, starting in a 1–0 away win against SD Ponferradina in the Segunda División. On 29 May, in his first start, he was sent off in a 4–2 success at FC Cartagena also in the league.

On 9 August 2013, free agent Alcañiz signed with neighbouring CF Fuenlabrada of the Segunda División B. On 12 July of the following year, he moved to SD Compostela also in the third level.

On 11 July 2015, Alcañiz joined CE Sabadell FC, recently relegated to the third tier.
