= Álvaro Zazo =

Spanish footballer

Personal information
- Full name: Álvaro Zazo Feito
- Date of birth: 18 August 1982 (age 44)
- Place of birth: Madrid, Spain
- Height: 1.82 m (6 ft 0 in)
- Position: Midfielder

Youth career
- 2000–2001: Real Madrid
- 2001–2002: Las Rozas

Senior career*
Years	Team	Apps	(Gls)
2002–2003	Toledo	15	(0)
2003–2005	Mallorca B	62	(5)
2005–2006	Fuenlabrada	34	(12)
2006–2010	Rayo Vallecano	21	(3)
2008–2009	→ Lorca Deportiva (loan)	36	(7)
2010–2011	Leganés	33	(3)
2011–2012	Tenerife	26	(2)
2012–2014	Guadalajara	37	(5)
2015	Avilés	9	(1)
2017–2019	SS Reyes	74	(6)
Total		347	(44)
- * Club domestic league appearances and goals

Álvaro Zazo Feito (born 18 August 1982) is a Spanish retired professional footballer who played as a midfielder.

== Club career ==
Born in Madrid, Zazo finished his youth career with local Las Rozas CF, making his senior debut in the 2002–03 season with CD Toledo, in the Segunda División B. A year later he joined RCD Mallorca, being exclusively associated to the reserves in his two-year spell and being relegated from the third division in his final one.

In the summer of 2005, Zazo signed with CF Fuenlabrada also in the Community of Madrid, scoring twelve goals in his first and only season. He then moved to neighbouring Rayo Vallecano also in the third tier, where he began suffering heavily from injury problems, which caused him to miss the entirety of the 2007–08 and 2009–10 campaigns; during his spell with the club, he also played with Lorca Deportiva CF on loan.

In July 2010, Zazo signed with CD Leganés. He left after one sole season, and joined CD Tenerife still in division three.

On 9 July 2012, Zazo signed with Segunda División side CD Guadalajara. He made his debut as a professional on 19 August, playing the full 90 minutes in a 1–1 away draw against AD Alcorcón. However, in September, he suffered another knee injury which kept him out of action for six months.

Zazo appeared in only six matches as the Castile-La Mancha team were relegated, and renewed his contract on 15 August 2013. On 15 March 2015, after nearly eight months without a club, he signed for Real Avilés.

On 11 January 2017, after almost two years of inactivity, Zazo joined third-tier UD San Sebastián de los Reyes. He retired at the end of 2019 aged 37, following medical advice.
