= Raúl González (footballer, born 1991) =

Spanish footballer

Personal information
- Full name: Raúl González Robles
- Date of birth: 25 April 1991 (age 35)
- Place of birth: Alicante, Spain
- Height: 1.83 m (6 ft 0 in)
- Position: Forward

Team information
- Current team: Torrellano

Youth career
- 2001–2004: Hércules
- 2004–2008: Alicante
- 2008–2009: SCD Carolinas
- 2009–2010: Hércules

Senior career*
Years	Team	Apps	(Gls)
2010–2012	Hércules B		
2012–2013	Hércules	5	(0)
2013	→ Orihuela (loan)	20	(1)
2013–2014	Yeclano	24	(9)
2014–2015	Novelda	30	(7)
2015	Quintanar Rey	9	(3)
2015–2017	Orihuela	66	(28)
2017–2018	Ontinyent	30	(6)
2018–2019	Ebro	37	(9)
2019–2021	Lleida Esportiu	50	(13)
2021–2022	Hércules	32	(7)
2022–2023	Alcoyano	13	(0)
2023–2024	Racing Cartagena	42	(11)
2024–	Torrellano	6	(2)
- * Club domestic league appearances and goals as of 13 October 2024

Raúl González Robles (born 25 April 1991), sometimes known simply as Raúl, is a Spanish footballer who plays as a forward for Tercera Federación club Torrellano.

== Club career ==
Raúl was born in Alicante, Valencian Community, playing youth football for three local clubs including Hércules CF. In the 2012–13 season he was promoted to the first team, finally settling on jersey 26 (a youth squad number) for financial purposes.

Raúl made his debut in Segunda División on 26 August 2012, coming on as a 60th-minute substitute for Alberto Escassi in an eventual 1–2 derby home loss against Elche CF. On 9 January of the following year, however, he was loaned to neighbouring Orihuela CF until the end of the season.
