= Teresa Herrera Trophy =

Teresa Herrera Trophy Trofeo Teresa Herrera
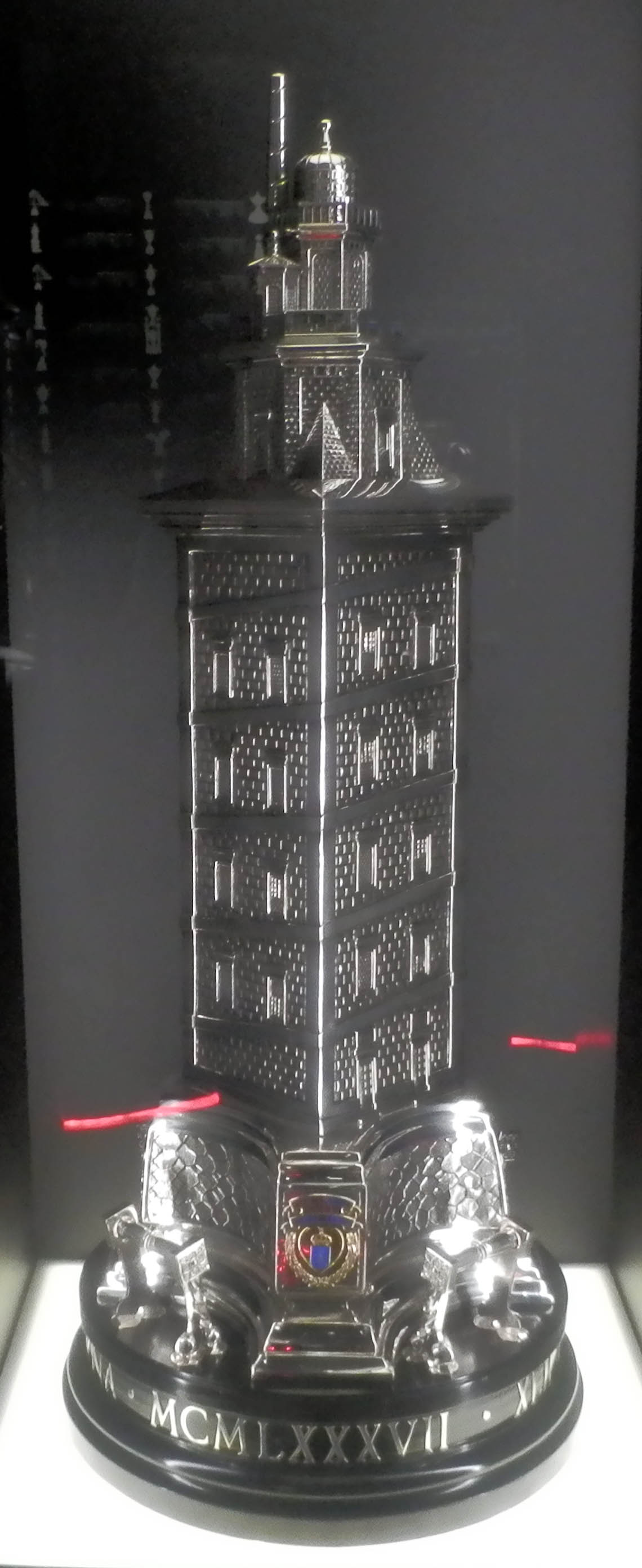
- Teresa Herrera Trophy on display at the Museu Cosme Damião
- Organiser(s): Deportivo de A Coruña
- Founded: 1946; 80 years ago
- Region: A Coruña, Spain
- Teams: 2
- Current champions: (Spain) Real Madrid (2026)
- Most championships: (Spain) Deportivo de A Coruña (26 titles)
- Broadcaster: Televisión de Galicia

The Teresa Herrera Trophy (Spanish: Trofeo Teresa Herrera) is an annual pre-season football tournament hosted by Deportivo de A Coruña at the Estadio Riazor.

Established in 1946, the tournament is usually held in August, and since 1990 it has always featured local club Deportivo.

The trophy was named after Teresa Herrera (1712–1791), a philanthropist born in A Coruña who dedicated her life to helping the poor and used her house as shelter for sick and poor women in the city. In 1791 she founded the Hospital de la Caridad ("Charity Hospital"), specially dedicated to maternity and orphanage.

== History ==
The competition, which was first played in 1946, originally began as a means of raising money for the poor in the city of A Coruña. The first edition was played between Sevilla and Athletic Club; Sevilla won the match 3–2.

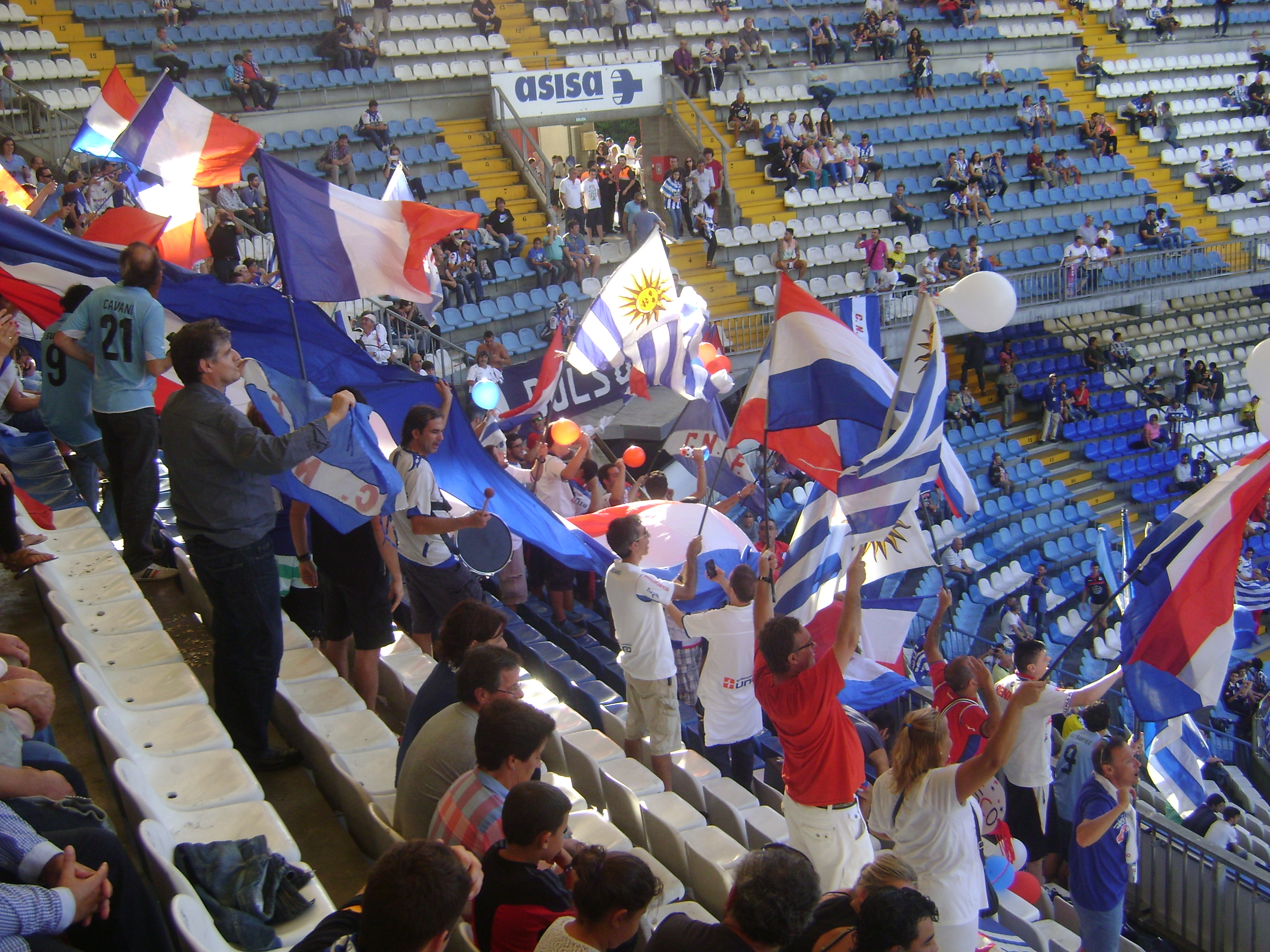
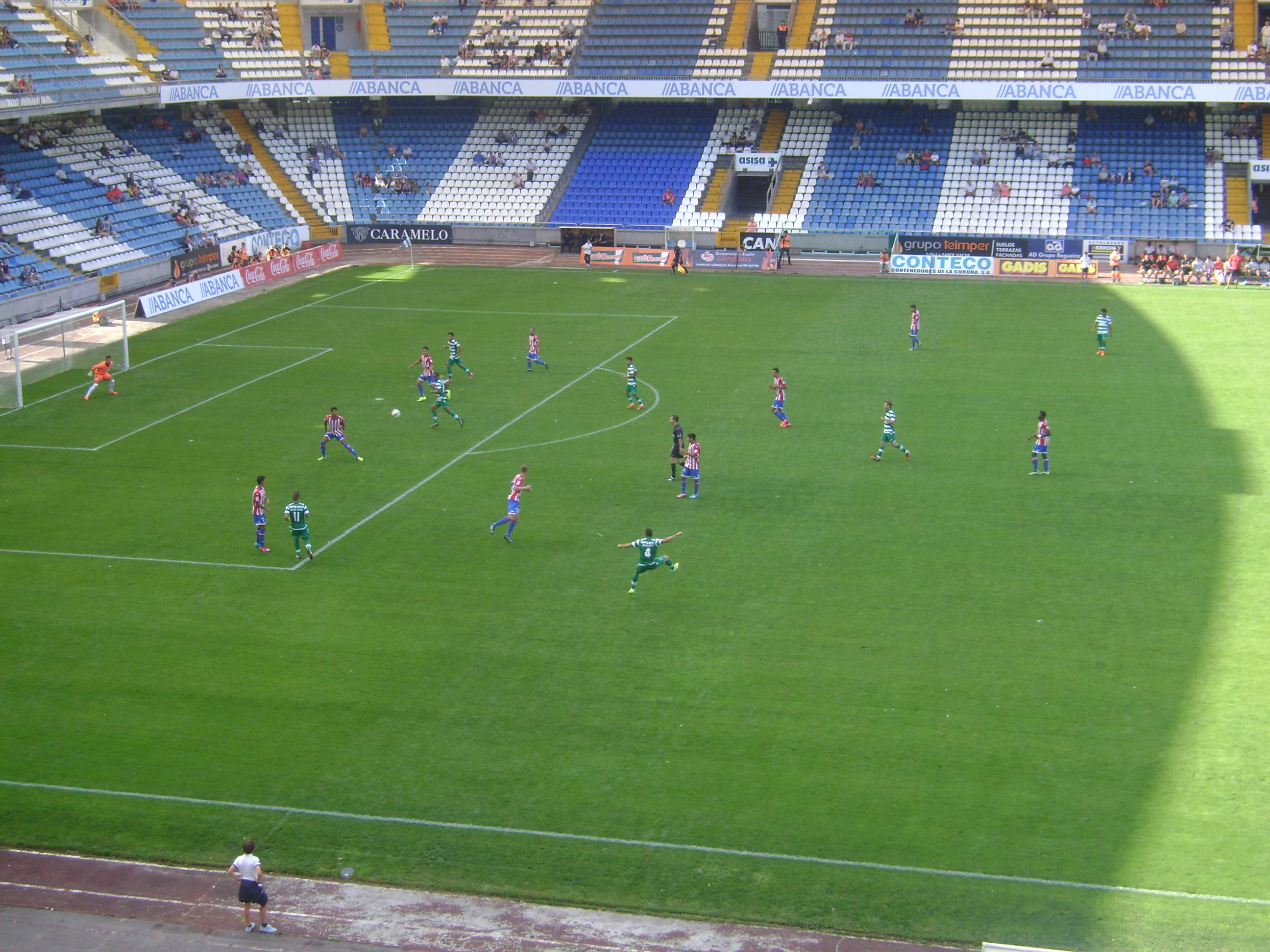
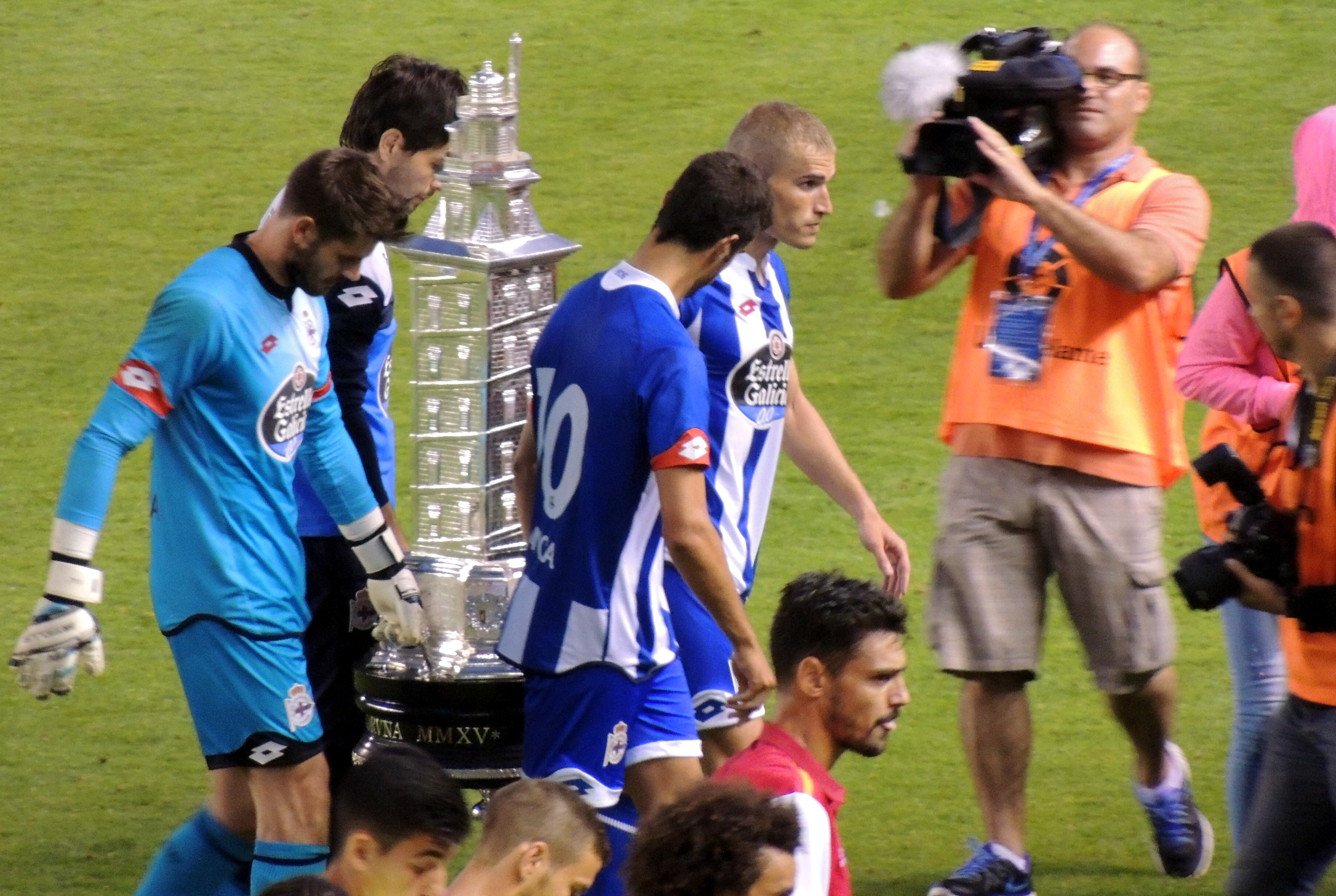
(First): Supporters of Uruguayan club Nacional in 2014; (second): Sporting v Sporting Gijón match, 2014; (third): Players of Deportivo de A Coruña holding the trophy in 2015

== List of winners ==
Ed.	Year	Winners	Score	Runners-up	Third place	Fourth place
1	1946	(Spain) Sevilla	3–2	(Spain) Athletic Club	none (Note: Two-teams competition.)	
2	1947	(Spain) Athletic Club	3–2	(Brazil) Vasco da Gama	none	
3	1948	(Spain) Barcelona	2–1	(Portugal) Porto	none	
4	1949	(Spain) Real Madrid	2–1	(France) Racing Club de Paris	none	
5	1950	(Italy) Lazio	3–1	(Spain) Atlético Madrid	none	
6	1951	(Spain) Barcelona	4–2	(Switzerland) Young Boys	none	
7	1952	(Spain) Valencia	2–1	(France) Olympique Roubaix	none	
8	1953	(Spain) Real Madrid	8–1	(France) Toulouse	none	
9	1954	(Spain) Sevilla	3–2	(Sweden) Helsingborg	none	
10	1955	(Spain) Deportivo de La Coruña	4–1	(Spain) Athletic Club	none	
11	1956	(Spain) Atlético Madrid	4–1	(Germany) 1. FC Köln	none	
12	1957	(Brazil) Vasco da Gama	4–2	(Spain) Athletic Club	none	
13	1958	(Uruguay) Nacional	2–1	(Brazil) Flamengo	none	
14	1959	(Brazil) Santos	4–1	(Brazil) Botafogo	none	
15	1960	(Spain) Sevilla	2–1	(England) Newcastle United	none	
16	1961	(Portugal) Sporting	3–2	(France) Reims	none	
17	1962	(Spain) Deportivo de La Coruña	4–2	(Portugal) Benfica	none	
18	1963	(France) Monaco	3–2	(Brazil) Vasco da Gama	none	
19	1964	(Spain) Deportivo de La Coruña	4–0	(Portugal) Sporting	(Portugal) Porto and (Italy) Roma	
20	1965	(Spain) Atlético Madrid	2–1	(Portugal) Vitória de Setúbal	none	
21	1966	(Spain) Real Madrid	2–0	(Spain) Deportivo de La Coruña	none	
22	1967	(Spain) Racing Ferrol	3–0	(Spain) Celta Vigo	(Spain) Deportivo de La Coruña	(Spain) Pontevedra
23	1968	(Portugal) Vitória de Setúbal	2–1	(Austria) Rapid Wien	none	
24	1969	(Spain) Deportivo de La Coruña	1–0	(Uruguay) Nacional	(Belgium) Olympic Charleroi	(Germany) Bayern Munich
25	1970	(Hungary) Ferencváros	0–0 (4–2 p)	(Argentina) San Lorenzo	none	
26	1971	(Socialist Federal Republic of Yugoslavia) Red Star Belgrade	3–1	(Spain) Deportivo de La Coruña	none	
27	1972	(Spain) Barcelona	2–0	(Netherlands) ADO Den Haag	none	
28	1973	(Spain) Atlético Madrid	2–1	(Czechoslovakia) Spartak Trnava	(Hungary) Újpest Dózsa	(Netherlands) Ajax
29	1974	(Uruguay) Peñarol	3–2	(Germany) Borussia MG	(Spain) Barcelona	(Spain) Atlético Madrid
30	1975	(Uruguay) Peñarol	3–3 (p)	(Brazil) Cruzeiro	(Spain) Atlético Madrid	(England) Stoke City
31	1976	(Spain) Real Madrid	2–0	(Brazil) Cruzeiro	(Netherlands) PSV Eindhoven	(Uruguay) Peñarol
32	1977	(Brazil) Fluminense	4–1	(Czechoslovakia) Dukla Prague	(Spain) Real Madrid	(Netherlands) Feyenoord
33	1978	(Spain) Real Madrid	2–0	(Brazil) Flamengo	(Spain) Deportivo de La Coruña	(Brazil) Fluminense
34	1979	(Spain) Real Madrid	1–0	(Spain) Sporting Gijón	(Hungary) Budapest Honvéd	(England) West Bromwich Albion
35	1980	(Spain) Real Madrid	3–1	(Spain) Sporting Gijón	(Portugal) Porto	(Brazil) Flamengo
36	1981	(Soviet Union) Dynamo Kyiv	1–0	(Spain) Atlético Madrid	(Spain) Deportivo de La Coruña	(Spain) Barcelona
37	1982	(Soviet Union) Dynamo Kyiv	4–1	(Spain) Barcelona	(Germany) Bayern Munich	(Brazil) Internacional
38	1983	(Spain) Athletic Bilbao	1–0	(Uruguay) Peñarol	(Spain) Real Madrid	(Soviet Union) Dynamo Kyiv
39	1984	(Italy) Roma	2–2 (p)	(Brazil) Vasco da Gama	(England) Manchester United	(Spain) Athletic Bilbao
40	1985	(Spain) Atlético Madrid	1–0	(Portugal) Porto	(Brazil) Fluminense	(Spain) Real Madrid
41	1986	(Spain) Atlético Madrid	1–0	(Brazil) Santos	(Spain) Real Madrid	(Brazil) São Paulo
42	1987	(Portugal) Benfica	1–1 (p)	(Spain) Deportivo de La Coruña	(Spain) Sporting Gijón	(England) Everton
43	1988	(Netherlands) PSV Eindhoven	3–1	(Spain) Atlético Madrid	(England) Liverpool	(Spain) Real Sociedad
44	1989	(Germany) Bayern Munich	4–1	(Romania) Steaua București	(Spain) Real Madrid	(Netherlands) PSV Eindhoven
45	1990	(Spain) Barcelona	2–0	(Portugal) Benfica	(Germany) Bayern Munich	(Spain) Deportivo de La Coruña
46	1991	(Portugal) Porto	1–0	(Spain) Deportivo de La Coruña	(Netherlands) Ajax	(Spain) Real Madrid
47	1992	(Brazil) São Paulo	4–1	(Spain) Barcelona	(Uruguay) Peñarol	(Spain) Deportivo de La Coruña
48	1993	(Spain) Barcelona	1–0	(Brazil) São Paulo	(Spain) Deportivo de La Coruña	(Italy) Lazio
49	1994	(Spain) Real Madrid	1–0	(Spain) Deportivo de La Coruña	(Italy) Sampdoria	(Portugal) Porto
50	1995	(Spain) Deportivo de La Coruña	2–0	(Spain) Real Madrid	(Brazil) Flamengo	(Portugal) Benfica
51	1996	(Brazil) Botafogo	4–4 (3–0 p)	(Italy) Juventus	(Spain) Deportivo de La Coruña	(Netherlands) Ajax
52	1997	(Spain) Deportivo de La Coruña	2–2 (p)	(Netherlands) PSV Eindhoven	(Spain) Atlético Madrid	(Brazil) Vasco da Gama
53	1998	(Spain) Deportivo de La Coruña	2–0	(Italy) Lazio	(Spain) Real Madrid	(Spain) Atlético Madrid
54	1999	(Spain) Celta Vigo	1–0	(Argentina) Boca Juniors	(Brazil) Corinthians	(Spain) Deportivo de La Coruña
55	2000	(Spain) Deportivo de La Coruña	2–2 (4–3 p)	(Italy) Lazio	none	
56	2001	(Spain) Deportivo de La Coruña	2–1	(Spain) Real Madrid	(Uruguay) Peñarol	(Mexico) Cruz Azul
57	2002	(Spain) Deportivo de La Coruña	1–0	(Mexico) Cruz Azul	(Spain) Atlético Madrid	(Uruguay) Nacional
58	2003	(Spain) Deportivo de La Coruña	Round-robin	(Mexico) América	(Uruguay) Nacional	—
59	2004	(Spain) Deportivo de La Coruña	3–1	(Spain) Atlético Madrid	(Spain) Real Zaragoza	(Portugal) Sporting
60	2005	(Spain) Deportivo de La Coruña	2–1	(Uruguay) Nacional	(Uruguay) Peñarol	—
61	2006	(Spain) Deportivo de La Coruña	3–1	(Italy) Milan	(Spain) Atlético Madrid	(Uruguay) Nacional
62	2007	(Spain) Deportivo de La Coruña	2–1	(Spain) Real Madrid	(Portugal) Os Belenenses	(Italy) Atalanta
63	2008	(Spain) Deportivo de La Coruña	2–1	(Spain) Atlético Madrid	(Mexico) Cruz Azul	(Spain) Sporting Gijón
64	2009	(Spain) Atlético Madrid	1–1 (4–3 p)	(Spain) Deportivo de La Coruña	none	
65	2010	(England) Newcastle United	0–0 (5–3 p)	(Spain) Deportivo de La Coruña	none	
66	2011	(Spain) Sevilla	1–1 (4–3 p)	(Spain) Deportivo de La Coruña	none	
67	2012	(Spain) Deportivo de La Coruña	2–2 (4–3 p)	(Spain) Atlético Madrid	none	
68	2013	(Spain) Real Madrid	4–0	(Spain) Deportivo de La Coruña	none	
69	2014	(Spain) Deportivo de La Coruña	1–0	(Spain) Sporting Gijón	(Portugal) Sporting	(Uruguay) Nacional
70	2015	(Spain) Deportivo de La Coruña	1–0	(Portugal) Braga	none	
71	2016	(Spain) Deportivo de La Coruña	2–0	(Spain) Villarreal	none	
72	2017	(Spain) Deportivo de La Coruña	2–0	(England) West Bromwich Albion	none	
73	2018	(Spain) Athletic Bilbao	2–2 (4–1 p)	(Spain) Deportivo de La Coruña	none	
74	2019	(Spain) Deportivo de La Coruña	1–0	(Spain) Real Betis	none	
75	2020	(Spain) Deportivo de La Coruña	6–0	(Spain) Amateur Combined (Note: Local name: "Combinado del Fútbol Aficionado Coruñés")	none	
76	2021	(Spain) Ponferradina	2–1	(Spain) Deportivo de La Coruña	none	
77	2022	(Spain) Deportivo de La Coruña	4–2	(Ukraine) Metalist Kharkiv	none	
78	2023	(Spain) Deportivo de La Coruña	4–0	(Brazil) Red Bull Bragantino II	none	
79	2024	(Spain) Leganés	3–1	(Spain) Deportivo de La Coruña	(Spain) Unionistas de Salamanca	(Spain) Real Oviedo
80	2025	(Spain) Deportivo de La Coruña	2–0	(France) Le Havre	none	
81	2026	(Spain) Real Madrid	1–0	(Spain) Deportivo de A Coruña	none	

== Women's tournament ==
Since 2013, a women's football edition of the trophy has also been held. Until 2016, when Deportivo de La Coruña established its women's football section, the tournament was hosted by a local women's team.

The inaugural edition was contested by the two local teams, second-tier Victoria CF and third-tier Orzán SD.

In 2014, the match was played at the Riazor for the first time and featured a foreign opponent, Boavista FC. A qualifying tournament for several local teams was held, which was won by the defending champions, Victoria. Boavista played in old Deportivo uniforms after their own kits were stolen.

In 2015, Victoria again made it to the Trophy after beating Orzán on penalties, but suffered a defeated against three-times national champions Rayo Vallecano.

=== List of winners ===
Ed.	Year	Winners	Result	Runners-up
1	2013	(Spain) Victoria	3–0	(Spain) Orzán
2	2014	(Spain) Victoria	2–1	(Portugal) Boavista
3	2015	(Spain) Rayo Vallecano	7–0	(Spain) Victoria
4	2016	(Spain) Deportivo de La Coruña	2–0	(Spain) Villarreal
5	2017	(Spain) Athletic Bilbao	1–0	(Spain) Deportivo de La Coruña
6	2018	(Spain) Athletic Bilbao	1–0	(Spain) Deportivo de La Coruña
7	2019	(Spain) Tenerife	5–1	(Spain) Deportivo de La Coruña
8	2020	(Spain) Deportivo de La Coruña	1–1 (5–3 p)	(Spain) Victoria
9	2021	(Portugal) Valadares Gaia	0–0 (5–4 p)	(Spain) Deportivo de La Coruña
10	2022	(Spain) Deportivo de La Coruña	2–2 (5–4 p)	(Portugal) Famalicão
11	2023	(Spain) Deportivo de La Coruña	2–0	(Spain) Alavés
12	2024	(Spain) Deportivo de La Coruña	2–1	(Spain) Athletic Bilbao
13	2025	(Spain) Deportivo de La Coruña	2–0	(Portugal) Braga
14	2026	(Spain) Deportivo de La Coruña	2–0	(Portugal) Porto

== Titles by club ==
=== Men's tournament ===
Team	Nation	Winners	Runners-up	Years won
Deportivo de A Coruña	Spain	26	13	1955, 1962, 1964, 1969, 1995, 1997, 1998, 2000, 2001, 2002, 2003, 2004, 2005, 2006, 2007, 2008, 2012, 2014, 2015, 2016, 2017, 2019, 2020, 2022, 2023, 2025
Real Madrid	Spain	10	3	1949, 1953, 1966, 1976, 1978, 1979, 1980, 1994, 2013, 2026
Atlético Madrid	Spain	6	6	1956, 1965, 1973, 1985, 1986, 2009
Barcelona	Spain	5	2	1948, 1951, 1972, 1990, 1993
Sevilla	Spain	4	0	1946, 1954, 1960, 2011
Athletic Bilbao	Spain	3	3	1947, 1983, 2018
Peñarol	Uruguay	2	1	1974, 1975
Dynamo Kyiv	Ukraine	2	0	1981, 1982
Vasco da Gama	Brazil	1	3	1957
Lazio	Italy	1	2	1950
Nacional	Uruguay	1	2	1958
Benfica	Portugal	1	2	1987
Porto	Portugal	1	2	1991
Santos	Brazil	1	1	1959
Sporting	Portugal	1	1	1961
Vitória de Setúbal	Portugal	1	1	1968
PSV Eindhoven	Netherlands	1	1	1988
São Paulo	Brazil	1	1	1992
Botafogo	Brazil	1	1	1996
Celta Vigo	Spain	1	1	1999
Newcastle United	England	1	1	2010
Valencia	Spain	1	0	1952
Monaco	France	1	0	1963
Racing Ferrol	Spain	1	0	1967
Ferencváros	Hungary	1	0	1970
Red Star Belgrade	Serbia	1	0	1971
Fluminense	Brazil	1	0	1977
Roma	Italy	1	0	1984
Bayern Munich	Germany	1	0	1989
Ponferradina	Spain	1	0	2021
Leganés	Spain	1	0	2024
The rest of the clubs		0	34	—
Total		81	81	

=== Women's tournament ===
Team	Nation	Winners	Years won
Deportivo de A Coruña	Spain	7	2016, 2020, 2022, 2023, 2024, 2025, 2026
Victoria	Spain	2	2013, 2014
Athletic Bilbao	Spain	2	2017, 2018
Rayo Vallecano	Spain	1	2015
Tenerife	Spain	1	2019
Valadares Gaia	Portugal	1	2021

== See also ==
- Colombino Trophy
- Ramón de Carranza Trophy
- Santiago Bernabéu Trophy
