= Guille Smitarello =

Spanish footballer

Personal information
- Full name: Guillermo Smitarello Pedernera
- Date of birth: 7 January 1993 (age 33)
- Place of birth: Torrevieja, Spain
- Height: 1.80 m (5 ft 11 in)
- Position: Defensive midfielder

Team information
- Current team: Utenis Utena
- Number: 8

Youth career
- 2003–2008: Hércules
- 2008–2010: Kelme
- 2010–2012: Hércules

Senior career*
| Years | Team | Apps | (Gls) |
| 2011–2013 | Hércules B | 13 | (0) |
| 2012–2013 | Hércules | 2 | (0) |
| 2013 | Recreativo B | 12 | (0) |
| 2013–2015 | Murcia B | 26 | (2) |
| 2014 | Murcia | 3 | (0) |
| 2015–2017 | Alcorcón B | 30 | (2) |
| 2017 | Eldense | 8 | (2) |
| 2017– | Utenis Utena | 1 | (0) |
- * Club domestic league appearances and goals as of 19 March 2017

Guillermo Smitarello Pedernera (born 7 January 1993) is a Spanish footballer who plays for Utenis Utena. Mainly a defensive midfielder he can also play as a central defender.

== Club career ==
Born in Torrevieja, Alicante, Valencia, Pibe graduated from Hércules CF's youth system, and made his senior debuts with the reserves in 2011, in the regional leagues. On 14 October 2012 he played his first match as a professional, playing the entire second half in a 2–1 away win against CE Sabadell FC in the Segunda División championship.

In January 2013 Pibe joined Recreativo de Huelva, being assigned to the B-side in Tercera División. He appeared regularly for the Andalusians, and moved to another reserve team in July, Real Murcia Imperial also in the fourth division.

On 30 August 2014 Pibe made his debut with the main squad, starting in a 2–1 Segunda División B away win against Racing de Ferrol.
