= Pepe Sellés =

Spanish footballer

Personal information
- Full name: José Sellés Mas
- Date of birth: 25 October 1993 (age 33)
- Place of birth: Alicante, Spain
- Height: 1.70 m (5 ft 7 in)
- Position: Left-back

Youth career
- 2002–2005: SCD Carolinas
- 2005–2011: Hércules

Senior career*
Years	Team	Apps	(Gls)
2011–2013	Hércules B	45	(1)
2012–2015	Hércules	6	(0)
2013–2014	→ Granada B (loan)	8	(0)
2015–2016	Eldense	31	(0)
2016–2018	Novelda	56	(3)
Total		146	(4)
- * Club domestic league appearances and goals

José "Pepe" Sellés Mas (born 25 October 1993) is a Spanish former professional footballer who played as a left-back.

== Club career ==
Born in Alicante, Valencian Community, Sellés joined local Hércules CF's youth system at the age of 11. He made his competitive debut with the club on 7 September 2011, playing the first half of a 3–2 home win against CD Alcoyano in that season's Copa del Rey.

Sellés made his first appearance in the Segunda División on 1 April 2012, featuring 90 minutes in the 3–1 away loss to Córdoba CF. On 14 August of the following year, he was loaned to Segunda División B side Club Recreativo Granada.

Sellés remained in the lower leagues until his retirement aged 24, representing CD Eldense and Novelda CF.

== International career ==
In February 2012, Sellés was called to the Spain under-19 team for training.
