= Miguel Ángel Riau =

Spanish footballer (born 1989)

Personal information
- Full name: Miguel Ángel Riau Ferragut
- Date of birth: 27 January 1989 (age 37)
- Place of birth: Lleida, Spain
- Height: 1.74 m (5 ft 8 1/2 in)
- Position: Winger

Youth career
- Lleida
- 2004–2008: Levante

Senior career*
Years	Team	Apps	(Gls)
2007–2008	Levante B	4	(1)
2008–2010	Valencia B	51	(7)
2010–2014	Cartagena	65	(4)
2011	→ Valencia B (loan)	4	(2)
2014–2015	Sabadell	13	(0)
Total		137	(14)
- * Club domestic league appearances and goals

Miguel Ángel Riau Ferragut (born 27 January 1989) is a Spanish former footballer who played as a left winger.

== Club career ==
Born in Lleida, Catalonia, Riau emerged through Levante UD's youth system, reaching the club at the age of 15. In 2007–08, he appeared in four games with the reserve team as the season ended in relegation from Segunda División B; he made his debut on 27 August 2007 in a 2–2 away draw against Ontinyent CF, starting and scoring in the match.

From 2008 to 2010, Riau competed again in the third tier, with Valencia CF's reserves. After suffering relegation at the end of the latter campaign, he signed a three-year contract with FC Cartagena of Segunda División.

Riau made his league debut with Efesé on 3 October 2010, playing ten minutes of the 1–1 draw at CD Tenerife. His stay with the Murcian club was greatly hampered by injuries, however, and he was also loaned to his former side Valencia B in January 2011.
