= Cristo Martín =

Spanish footballer

Personal information
- Full name: Cristo Martín Hernández
- Date of birth: 18 June 1987 (age 39)
- Place of birth: Santa Cruz de Tenerife, Spain
- Height: 1.74 m (5 ft 8 1/2 in)
- Position: Attacking midfielder

Team information
- Current team: Minerva

Youth career
- 1996–2006: Tenerife

Senior career*
Years	Team	Apps	(Gls)
2006–2009	Tenerife B	63	(7)
2008–2009	Tenerife	3	(0)
2009–2011	Universidad LP	48	(1)
2011–2012	Marino	37	(2)
2012–2015	Tenerife	99	(2)
2015–2019	Cartagena	102	(10)
2019–2020	Minerva	16	(5)
2020	Algeciras	4	(0)
2020	Lorca	2	(0)
2020–2021	Racing Murcia	23	(2)
2021–2022	Atlético Pulpileño	15	(0)
2022–2023	Águilas	44	(2)
2023–2025	Atlético Pulpileño	34	(4)
2025–	Minerva	9	(1)
- * Club domestic league appearances and goals as of 9 November 2025

Cristo Martín Hernández (born 18 June 1987) is a Spanish professional footballer who plays for Tercera Federación club Minerva as an attacking midfielder.

== Club career ==
Born in Santa Cruz de Tenerife, Canary Islands, Martín began his professional career at local CD Tenerife, making his senior debut with their B team in the 2006–07 season, in the Tercera División. His first competitive appearance for the main squad took place on 30 August 2008, when he started a 3–2 Segunda División home win against Gimnàstic de Tarragona.

Martín spent the following years in his native region, with Universidad de Las Palmas CF in the Segunda División B and CD Marino (Tercera División). In summer 2012 he returned to Tenerife, now in the former tier, achieving his second promotion with the club at the end of the campaign; he scored his only goal in division two on 28 September 2014, closing the 3–2 home victory over UD Las Palmas.

Until his retirement, Martín competed solely in the lower leagues, mainly with FC Cartagena.
