= Estadio Nuevo Colombino =

Football stadium in Huelva, Spain

Nuevo Colombino
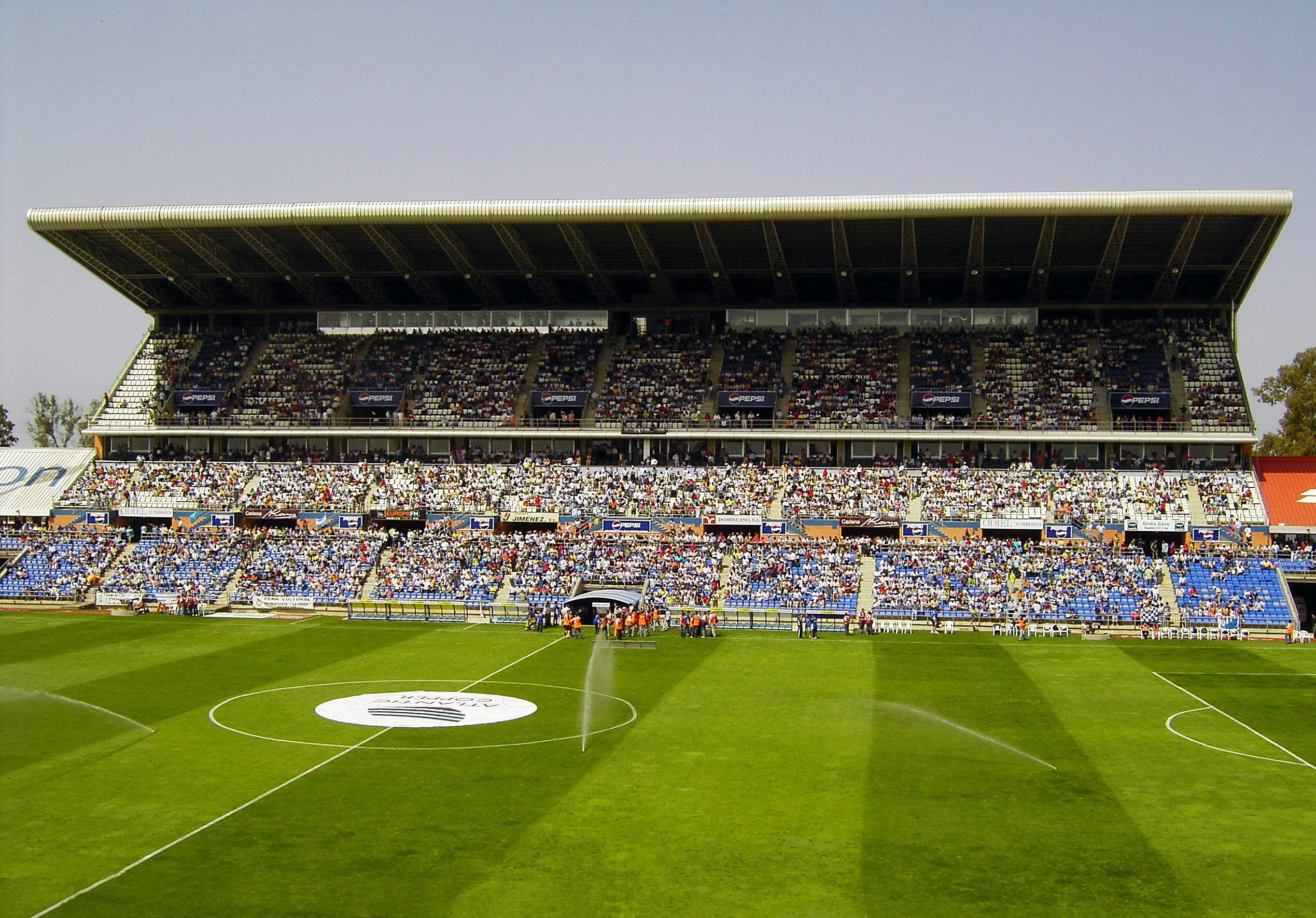
- Interactive map of Nuevo Colombino
- Location: Huelva, Spain
- Coordinates: 37°14′47″N 6°57′15″W
- Owner: Ayuntamiento de Huelva
- Operator: Ayuntamiento de Huelva
- Capacity: 21,670
- Field size: 105 metres (115 yd) x 68 metres (74 yd)

Construction
- Opened: 2001
- Cost: €14,000,000
- Architect: Joaquín Aramburu

Tenants
- Recreativo de Huelva (2001–present); Sporting de Huelva (selected matches); Spain national football team (selected matches)

Estadio Nuevo Colombino is a multi-purpose stadium in Huelva, Spain. It is currently used mostly for football matches and is the home ground of Recreativo de Huelva. Football was first introduced to Spain in Huelva and it still hosts the annual Trofeo Colombino, one of the traditional curtain-raisers to the Spanish football season. With a capacity of 21,670 seats, it is the 30th-largest stadium in Spain and the 6th-largest in Andalusia. Opened in November 2001, it replaced Estadio Colombino.

Estadio Nuevo Colombino hosted a Spain international match on 15 November 2014, a European Championship Qualifying match against Belarus.
