= Hugo Álvarez (footballer, born 1985) =

Spanish footballer

Personal information
- Full name: Hugo Álvarez Quintas
- Date of birth: 21 June 1985 (age 41)
- Place of birth: Vigo, Spain
- Height: 1.83 m (6 ft 0 in)
- Position: Centre back

Youth career
- –2003: Celta
- 2003–2004: Real Madrid

Senior career*
Years	Team	Apps	(Gls)
2004–2006	Las Rozas		
2006–2007	Rayo B		
2006	Rayo Vallecano	1	(0)
2007–2008	Leganés	23	(2)
2008–2009	Alcorcón	27	(1)
2009–2010	Zamora	17	(0)
2010–2011	Almería B	35	(1)
2011–2012	Real Unión	22	(0)
2012–2013	Cartagena	32	(2)
2013–2014	Jaén	32	(2)
2014	Real Murcia	0	(0)
2014–2015	Tenerife	24	(0)
2015–2016	Elche	16	(0)
2016–2017	UCAM Murcia	26	(0)
2017–2018	Alcorcón	19	(0)
2018–2019	Real Murcia	33	(0)
2019–2020	UCAM Murcia	23	(2)
- * Club domestic league appearances and goals

Hugo Álvarez Quintas (born 21 June 1985) is a Spanish former footballer who played as a central defender.

== Club career ==
Born in Vigo, Galicia, Álvarez made his senior debuts with Las Rozas CF, after playing youth football with RC Celta de Vigo and Real Madrid. He first arrived in Segunda División B in summer 2006 by signing for Rayo Vallecano, and remained in that level for that and the following six seasons, representing in quick succession CD Leganés, AD Alcorcón, Zamora CF, UD Almería B, Real Unión and FC Cartagena.

On 11 July 2013, Álvarez joined Real Jaén, freshly promoted to division two. On 25 August he made his debut as a professional, playing the full 90 minutes in a 2–4 away defeat against CD Numancia in the Segunda División championship; he scored his first goal on 8 September in a 3–1 home win against Girona FC, and appeared regularly for the Andalusians which were relegated at the end of the campaign.

On 22 July 2014, Álvarez moved to fellow league club Real Murcia. However, after its administrative relegation, he terminated his contract and signed with CD Tenerife also in the second tier.

After appearing regularly for the Canarians, Álvarez joined Elche CF in the same division on 10 August 2015. On 1 July of the following year, he moved to fellow league side UCAM Murcia CF.

On 6 July 2017, after suffering relegation, Álvarez returned to Alcorcón after agreeing to a two-year deal.
