= List of Spanish football transfers summer 2014 =

This is a list of Spanish football transfers for the summer sale in the 2014–15 season of La Liga and Segunda División. Only moves from La Liga and Segunda División are listed.

The summer transfer window began on 1 July 2014, although a few transfers took place prior to that date. The window closed at midnight on 1 September 2014. Players without a club can join one at any time, either during or in between transfer windows. Clubs below La Liga level can also sign players on loan at any time. If need be, clubs can sign a goalkeeper on an emergency loan, if all others are unavailable.

== La Liga ==
=== Almería ===
Manager: Francisco Rodríguez (2nd season)

In:

Out:

No.	Pos.	Nation	Player
2	DF	BRA	Michel Macedo (loan return from Atlético Mineiro)
3	DF	ESP	Fran Vélez (promoted from Almería B)
4	DF	ESP	Ximo Navarro (from Mallorca)
18	FW	THA	Teerasil Dangda (on loan from Muangthong United)
6	DF	ARG	Mauro dos Santos (from Murcia)
11	FW	ESP	Quique González (from Guadalajara)
10	FW	ISR	Tomer Hemed (from Mallorca)
25	GK	ESP	Rubén Martínez (from Rayo Vallecano)
17	MF	ESP	Édgar Méndez (loan return from Tenerife)
8	FW	BRA	Wellington Silva (on loan from Arsenal, previously on loan at Murcia)
9	FW	CGO	Thievy Bifouma (on loan from Espanyol, previously on loan at West Bromwich Albion)
22	MF	GHA	Thomas Partey (on loan from Atlético Madrid, previously on loan at Mallorca)

No.	Pos.	Nation	Player
—	FW	ESP	Óscar Díaz (to Valladolid)
—	GK	ESP	Esteban Suárez (to Oviedo)
—	DF	ESP	Rafita (to Murcia)
—	DF	URU	Marcelo Silva (to Las Palmas)
—	MF	ESP	Marcos Tébar (to Brentford)
—	MF	ESP	Aleix Vidal (to Sevilla)

=== Athletic Bilbao ===
Manager: Ernesto Valverde (2nd season)

In:

Out:

No.	Pos.	Nation	Player
21	FW	ESP	Borja Viguera (from Alavés)

No.	Pos.	Nation	Player
—	DF	ESP	Unai Albizua (on loan to Tenerife)
—	DF	ESP	Borja Ekiza (to Eibar)
—	GK	ESP	Raúl Fernández (to Racing Santander)
—	MF	ESP	Ander Herrera (to Manchester United)
—	DF	ESP	Enric Saborit (on loan to Mallorca)

=== Atlético Madrid ===
Manager: (Argentina) Diego Simeone (4th season)

In:

Out:

No.	Pos.	Nation	Player
15	DF	ARG	Cristian Ansaldi (on loan from Rubin Kazan)
19	FW	ARG	Ángel Correa (from San Lorenzo)
18	DF	ESP	Jesús Gámez (from Málaga)
7	MF	FRA	Antoine Griezmann (from Real Sociedad)
11	FW	MEX	Raúl Jiménez (from América)
9	FW	CRO	Mario Mandžukić (from Bayern Munich)
1	GK	ESP	Miguel Ángel Moyà (from Getafe)
13	GK	SLO	Jan Oblak (from Benfica)
17	MF	ESP	Saúl Ñíguez (loan return from Rayo Vallecano)
3	DF	BRA	Guilherme Siqueira (from Granada, previously on loan at Benfica)

No.	Pos.	Nation	Player
—	GK	BEL	Thibaut Courtois (loan return to Chelsea)
—	FW	ESP	Diego Costa (to Chelsea)
—	FW	ESP	Adrián López (to Porto)
—	DF	BRA	Filipe Luís (to Chelsea)
—	DF	ESP	Javier Manquillo (on loan to Liverpool)
—	MF	BRA	Diego Ribas (to Fenerbahçe)
—	FW	ESP	David Villa (to New York City, loaned to Melbourne City)

=== Barcelona ===
Manager: Luis Enrique Martínez (1st season)

In:

Out:

No.	Pos.	Nation	Player
12	MF	BRA	Rafinha Alcântara (loan return from Celta Vigo)
13	GK	CHI	Claudio Bravo (from Real Sociedad)
25	GK	ESP	Jordi Masip (promoted from Barcelona B)
24	DF	FRA	Jérémy Mathieu (from Valencia)
4	MF	CRO	Ivan Rakitić (from Sevilla)
1	GK	GER	Marc-André ter Stegen (from Borussia Mönchengladbach)
9	FW	URU	Luis Suárez (from Liverpool)
23	DF	BEL	Thomas Vermaelen (from Arsenal)
16	DF	BRA	Douglas Pereira dos Santos (from São Paulo)

No.	Pos.	Nation	Player
19	MF	NED	Ibrahim Afellay (on loan to Olympiacos)
23	MF	ESP	Isaac Cuenca (to Deportivo La Coruña)
12	MF	MEX	Jonathan dos Santos (to Villarreal)
4	MF	ESP	Cesc Fàbregas (to Chelsea)
25	GK	ESP	Oier Olazábal (to Granada)
13	GK	ESP	José Manuel Pinto (unattached)
5	DF	ESP	Carles Puyol (retired)
9	FW	CHI	Alexis Sánchez (to Arsenal)
20	FW	ESP	Cristian Tello (on loan to Porto)
1	GK	ESP	Victor Valdés (unattached)
27	FW	ESP	Gerard Deulofeu (on loan to Sevilla)

=== Celta Vigo ===
Manager: (Argentina) Eduardo Berizzo (1st season)

In:

No.	Pos.	Nation	Player
20	DF	ESP	Sergi Gómez (from Barcelona B)
5	MF	CHI	Pablo Hernández (from O'Higgins)
11	FW	ARG	Joaquín Larrivey (from Rayo Vallecano)
18	DF	ESP	Carles Planas (from Barcelona B)
6	MF	SRB	Nemanja Radoja (from Vojvodina)

Out:

No.	Pos.	Nation	Player
—	MF	BRA	Rafinha Alcântara (loan return to Barcelona)
—	FW	ESP	Mario Bermejo (retired)
—	DF	ESP	Íñigo López (loan return to PAOK, later signed by Córdoba)
—	GK	ESP	Yoel (on loan to Valencia)

=== Córdoba ===
Manager: Albert Ferrer (2nd season)

In:

No.	Pos.	Nation	Player
10	MF	ARG	Fede Cartabia (on loan from Valencia)
3	DF	ESP	José Ángel Crespo (on loan from Bologna)
15	DF	ESP	Deivid (from Las Palmas)
5	MF	CMR	Patrick Ekeng (from Lausanne)
16	MF	ESP	Fidel (on loan from Elche)
18	FW	ESP	Borja García (on loan from Real Madrid Castilla)
14	FW	JPN	Mike Havenaar (from Vitesse Arnhem)
11	MF	ESP	José Carlos (from Rayo Vallecano)
12	DF	ESP	Íñigo López (from PAOK, previously on loat at Celta Vigo)
20	MF	BRA	Ryder Matos (on loan from Fiorentina)
2	DF	SRB	Aleksandar Pantić (on loan from Villarreal)
7	MF	ITA	Fausto Rossi (on loan from Juventus, previously on loan at Valladolid)

Out:

No.	Pos.	Nation	Player
—	FW	ESP	Arturo (on loan to Alcorcón)
—	DF	ESP	Bernardo Cruz (on loan to Racing Santander)
—	DF	ESP	Fran Cruz (on loan to Alcorcón)
—	DF	ESP	Samu de los Reyes (on loan to Lugo)
—	MF	ESP	Pelayo (loan return to Elche, later loaned to Lugo)
—	FW	ESP	Pedro Sánchez (to Zaragoza)
—	GK	GHA	Brimah Razak (to Mirandés)

=== Deportivo La Coruña ===
Manager: Víctor Fernández (1st season)

In:

No.	Pos.	Nation	Player
3	DF	ESP	Roberto Canella (on loan from Sporting Gijón)
19	FW	POR	Ivan Cavaleiro (on loan from Benfica)
14	MF	ESP	Isaac Cuenca (from Barcelona)
8	MF	BIH	Haris Medunjanin (from Gaziantepspor)
24	MF	ARG	Luis Fariña (on loan from Benfica, previously on loan at Baniyas)
7	MF	ESP	Lucas Pérez (on loan from PAOK)
6	MF	ESP	José Rodríguez (on loan from Real Madrid)

Out:

No.	Pos.	Nation	Player
—	FW	ESP	Luis Fernández (on loan to Lugo)
—	FW	URU	Diego Ifrán (loan return to Real Sociedad, later loaned to Tenerife)
—	MF	ESP	Antonio Núñez (to Recreativo Huelva)

=== Eibar ===
Manager: Gaizka Garitano (3rd season)

In:

No.	Pos.	Nation	Player
9	FW	ESP	Ángel (from Levante)
20	FW	ESP	Manu del Moral (on loan from Sevilla, previously on loan at Elche)
18	MF	GHA	Derek Boateng (from Fulham)
5	DF	ESP	Borja Ekiza (from Athletic Bilbao)
25	GK	ESP	Jaime Jiménez (from Valladolid)
23	MF	ESP	Javi Lara (from Ponferradina)
21	DF	ESP	Abraham Minero (from Zaragoza)
11	MF	ESP	Dani Nieto (from Barcelona B)
19	FW	ITA	Federico Piovaccari (on loan from Sampdoria, previously on loan at Steaua Bucharest)

Out:

No.	Pos.	Nation	Player
—	DF	ESP	Aitor Arregi (on loan to Cádiz)
—	DF	ESP	Yuri Berchiche (loan return to Real Sociedad)
—	MF	ESP	Alain Eizmendi (loan return to Real Sociedad, later signed by Leganés)
—	MF	BRA	Gilvan Gomes (loan return to Hércules)
—	GK	ARG	Matías Ibáñez (to Lanús)
—	MF	ESP	Jota (loan return to Celta de Vigo, later signed by Brentford)
—	FW	ESP	José Luis Morales (loan return to Levante)
—	FW	ESP	Aitor Ortega (on loan to Amorebieta)
—	MF	ESP	Diego Jiménez (to Olímpic de Xàtiva)
—	FW	ESP	Urko Vera (to Mirandés)

=== Elche ===
Manager: Fran Escribá (3rd season)

In:

No.	Pos.	Nation	Player
20	MF	FRA	Fayçal Fajr (from Caen)
8	MF	ESP	Adrián González (from Rayo Vallecano)
22	FW	BRA	Jonathas (on loan from Latina)
6	MF	ESP	Pedro Mosquera (from Getafe)
24	MF	CRO	Mario Pašalić (on loan from Chelsea)
3	DF	CHI	Enzo Roco (on loan from Universidad Católica)
17	MF	ESP	Víctor Rodríguez (from Zaragoza)
25	GK	POL	Przemysław Tytoń (on loan from PSV Eindhoven)

Out:

No.	Pos.	Nation	Player
—	DF	ESP	Alberto Botía (loan return to Sevilla, later signed by Olympiacos)
—	FW	ESP	Manu del Moral (loan return to Sevilla, later loaned to Eibar)
—	MF	ESP	Fidel (on loan to Córdoba)
—	MF	ESP	Javi Flores (unattached)
—	MF	ESP	Sergio Mantecón (to Cádiz)
—	MF	ESP	Javi Márquez (loan return to Mallorca, later signed by Granada)
—	MF	ESP	Rubén Pérez (loan return to Atlético Madrid, later loaned to Torino)
—	MF	ESP	Alberto Rivera (retired)
24	MF	COL	Carlos Sánchez (to Aston Villa)
—	GK	ESP	Toño (to Zaragoza)

=== Espanyol ===
Manager: Sergio González (1st season)

In:

No.	Pos.	Nation	Player
23	DF	ESP	Anaitz Arbilla (from Rayo Vallecano)
20	FW	ECU	Felipe Caicedo (from Al-Jazira)
22	DF	ESP	Álvaro González (from Zaragoza)
24	MF	ESP	Paco Montañés (from Zaragoza)
6	MF	ESP	Salva Sevilla (from Betis)
17	MF	ESP	Lucas Vázquez (on loan from Real Madrid Castilla)

Out:

No.	Pos.	Nation	Player
—	DF	ESP	Joan Capdevila (to North East United FC)
—	FW	POR	Simão Sabrosa (unattached)

=== Getafe ===
Manager: (Romania) Cosmin Contra (2nd season)

In:

No.	Pos.	Nation	Player
15	GK	ESP	Vicente Guaita (from Valencia)
23	MF	COL	Fredy Hinestroza (on loan from La Equidad)
1	GK	ESP	Jonathan López (from Veria)
—	MF	ESP	Míchel (on loan from Valencia)
11	MF	FRA	Karim Yoda (from Astra Giurgiu)

Out:

No.	Pos.	Nation	Player
—	MF	ESP	Borja Fernández (to Atlético de Kolkata)
—	MF	ESP	Jaime Gavilán (to Levante)
—	MF	ESP	Pedro Mosquera (to Elche)
—	GK	ESP	Miguel Ángel Moyà (to Atlético Madrid)

=== Granada ===
Manager: Joaquín Caparrós (1st season)

In:

No.	Pos.	Nation	Player
6	DF	MTQ	Jean-Sylvain Babin (from Alcorcón)
20	MF	ESP	Juan Carlos (on loan from Braga, previously on loan at Betis)
18	FW	COL	Jhon Córdoba (from Querétaro, previously on loan at Tigres UANL)
19	FW	SWE	Daniel Larsson (from Valladolid)
8	MF	ESP	Javi Márquez (from Mallorca, previously on loan at Elche)
1	GK	ESP	Oier Olazábal (from Barcelona)
21	FW	ESP	Alfredo Ortuño (loan return from Girona)
23	FW	ESP	Rubén Rochina (from Blackburn Rovers, previously on loan at Rayo Vallecano)
17	MF	FRA	Abdoul Sissoko (on loan from Udinese, previously on loan at Hércules)
7	DF	ESP	Héctor Yuste (loan return from Hércules)

Out:

No.	Pos.	Nation	Player
—	DF	COL	Brayan Angulo (to Ludogorets Razgrad)
—	FW	ALG	Yacine Brahimi (to Porto)
—	MF	FRA	Alexandre Coeff (loan return to Udinese, later loaned to Mallorca)
—	FW	NGR	Odion Ighalo (loan return to Udinese, later loaned to Watford)
—	GK	GRE	Orestis Karnezis (loan return to Udinese)

=== Levante ===
Manager: José Luis Mendilibar (1st season)

In:

No.	Pos.	Nation	Player
1	GK	ESP	Jesús Fernández (from Real Madrid)
14	MF	ESP	Jaime Gavilán (from Getafe)
13	GK	ESP	Diego Mariño (from Valladolid)
9	FW	BRA	Rafael Martins (from Audax São Paulo, previously on loan at Vitória Setubal)
11	FW	ESP	José Luis Morales (loan return from Eibar)
20	MF	ESP	Víctor Pérez (from Valladolid)

Out:

No.	Pos.	Nation	Player
—	FW	ESP	Ángel (to Eibar)
—	DF	ESP	Nagore (to Alcorcón)
—	GK	CRC	Keylor Navas (to Real Madrid)
—	MF	POR	Sérgio Pinto (to Fortuna Düsseldorf)
—	MF	ESP	Pedro Ríos (to Recreativo Huelva)

=== Málaga ===
Manager: Javi Gracia (1st season)

In:

No.	Pos.	Nation	Player
22	FW	ESP	Luis Alberto (on loan from Liverpool)
19	DF	CIV	Arthur Boka (from Stuttgart)
10	MF	POR	Ricardo Horta (from Vitória Setúbal)
13	GK	MEX	Guillermo Ochoa (from Ajaccio)
18	DF	VEN	Roberto Rosales (from Twente)
23	DF	ESP	Miguel Torres (from Olympiacos)

Out:

No.	Pos.	Nation	Player
—	GK	ARG	Willy Caballero (to Manchester City)
—	MF	POR	Eliseu (to Benfica)
—	DF	ESP	Jesús Gámez (to Atlético Madrid)
—	MF	POL	Bartłomiej Pawłowski (to Lechia Gdańsk)

=== Rayo Vallecano ===
Manager: Paco Jémez (3rd season)

In:

No.	Pos.	Nation	Player
13	GK	ARG	Cristian Álvarez (from San Lorenzo)
4	DF	ESP	Antonio Amaya (from Betis)
16	MF	MEX	Javier Aquino (on loan from Villarreal)
21	DF	ESP	Diego Aguirre (from Toledo)
15	DF	SEN	Abdoulaye Ba (on loan from Porto, previously on loan at Vitória Guimaraes)
22	MF	ESP	Jozabed (from Jaén)
19	FW	BRA	Léo Baptistão (on loan from Atlético Madrid, previously on loan at Betis)
12	MF	FRA	Gaël Kakuta (on loan from Chelsea, previously on loan at Lazio)
25	FW	POR	Licá (on loan from Porto)
9	FW	ANG	Manucho (from Valladolid)
20	DF	ESP	Jorge Morcillo (from Recreativo Huelva)
27	FW	ESP	Álex Moreno (from Mallorca)
6	FW	ESP	Jonathan Pereira (on loan from Villarreal)
24	MF	ESP	Alejandro Pozuelo (from Swansea City)
17	DF	ESP	Quini (from Real Madrid Castilla)

Out:

No.	Pos.	Nation	Player
—	DF	ESP	Anaitz Arbilla (to Espanyol)
—	FW	MEX	Nery Castillo (to AEL Kalloni)
—	FW	URU	Seba Fernández (to Nacional Montevideo)
—	DF	ESP	Álex Gálvez (to Werder Bremen)
—	MF	ESP	Adrián González (to Elche)
—	MF	ESP	José Carlos (to Córdoba)
—	MF	ESP	Iago Falque (loan return to Tottenham Hotspur, later signed by Genoa)
—	FW	ARG	Joaquín Larrivey (to Celta)
—	FW	ITA	Samuele Longo (loan return to Inter Milan, later loaned to Cagliari)
—	GK	ESP	Rubén Martínez (to Almería)
—	DF	COL	Johan Mojica (on loan to Valladolid)
—	MF	ESP	Saúl Ñíguez (loan return to Atlético Madrid)
—	FW	ESP	Alberto Perea (to UE Llagostera)
—	FW	ESP	Rubén Rochina (loan return to Blackburn Rovers, later signed by Granada)

=== Real Madrid ===
Manager: (Italy) Carlo Ancelotti (2nd season)

In:

No.	Pos.	Nation	Player
8	MF	GER	Toni Kroos (from Bayern Munich)
13	GK	CRC	Keylor Navas (from Levante)
10	MF	COL	James Rodríguez (from Monaco)
14	FW	MEX	Javier Hernández (from Manchester United)

Out:

No.	Pos.	Nation	Player
14	MF	ESP	Xabi Alonso (to Bayern)
16	MF	BRA	Casemiro (on loan to Porto)
13	GK	ESP	Jesús Fernández (to Levante)
25	GK	ESP	Diego López (to Milan)
21	FW	ESP	Álvaro Morata (to Juventus)
17	AM	ARG	Ángel Di María (to Manchester United)

=== Real Sociedad ===
Manager: Jagoba Arrasate (2nd season)

In:

No.	Pos.	Nation	Player
19	DF	ESP	Yuri Berchiche (loan return from Eibar)
1	GK	ARG	Gerónimo Rulli (on loan from Estudiantes de La Plata)
7	FW	ISL	Alfreð Finnbogason (from Heerenveen)

Out:

No.	Pos.	Nation	Player
—	GK	CHI	Claudio Bravo (to Barcelona)
—	MF	FRA	Antoine Griezmann (to Atlético Madrid)
—	DF	ESP	José Ángel (loan return to Roma, later signed by Porto)
—	MF	ESP	Javier Ros (to Mallorca)
—	FW	SUI	Haris Seferovic (to Eintracht Frankfurt)

=== Sevilla ===
Manager: Unai Emery (3rd season)

In:

No.	Pos.	Nation	Player
24	DF	ESP	Alejandro Arribas (from Osasuna)
14	FW	ESP	Iago Aspas (on loan from Liverpool)
19	MF	ARG	Éver Banega (from Valencia, previously on loan at Newell's Old Boys)
25	GK	ARG	Mariano Barbosa (from Las Palmas)
18	FW	ESP	Gerard Deulofeu (on loan from Barcelona, previously on loan at Everton)
4	MF	POL	Grzegorz Krychowiak (from Stade Reims)
—	MF	BIH	Miroslav Stevanović (loan return from Alavés)
17	MF	ESP	Denis Suárez (on loan from Barcelona)
22	MF	ESP	Aleix Vidal (from Almería)

Out:

No.	Pos.	Nation	Player
—	MF	RUS	Denis Cheryshev (loan return to Real Madrid, later loaned to Villarreal)
—	MF	GER	Marko Marin (loan return to Chelsea, later loaned to Fiorentina)
—	DF	ESP	Alberto Moreno (to Liverpool)
—	MF	ARG	Diego Perotti (to Genoa)
—	MF	CRO	Ivan Rakitić (to Barcelona)

=== Valencia ===
Manager: (Portugal) Nuno Espírito Santo (1st season)

In:

No.	Pos.	Nation	Player
—	DF	POR	João Cancelo (on loan from Benfica)
—	MF	ARG	Rodrigo De Paul (from Racing de Avellaneda)
—	MF	POR	André Gomes (from Benfica)
18	MF	MEX	Andrés Guardado (loan return from Bayer Leverkusen)
—	DF	GER	Shkodran Mustafi (from Sampdoria)
—	DF	ARG	Lucas Orbán (from Girondins Bordeaux)
—	DF	ARG	Nicolás Otamendi (loan return from Atlético Mineiro)
—	FW	ESP	Rodrigo (from Benfica)
—	GK	ESP	Yoel (on loan from Celta Vigo)
—	MF	ARG	Bruno Zuculini (on loan from Manchester City)
—	FW	ESP	Álvaro Negredo (on loan from Manchester City)

Out:

No.	Pos.	Nation	Player
—	DF	ESP	Juan Bernat (to Bayern Munich)
—	MF	ARG	Fede Cartabia (on loan to Córdoba)
—	DF	POR	Ricardo Costa (to Al-Sailiya)
—	GK	ESP	Vicente Guaita (to Getafe)
—	MF	MLI	Seydou Keita (to Roma)
—	DF	FRA	Jérémy Mathieu (to Barcelona)
—	MF	ESP	Míchel (on loan to Getafe)
—	MF	ESP	Oriol Romeu (loan return to Chelsea, later loaned to Stuttgart)
—	DF	ESP	Víctor Ruiz (on loan to Villarreal)
—	DF	SUI	Phillipe Senderos (loan return to Fulham, later signed by Aston Villa)

=== Villarreal ===
Manager: Marcelino García Toral (3rd season)

In:

No.	Pos.	Nation	Player
17	MF	RUS	Denis Cheryshev (on loan from Real Madrid, previously loaned at Sevilla)
6	MF	MEX	Jonathan dos Santos (from Barcelona)
24	MF	ESP	Javier Espinosa (from Barcelona B)
23	FW	ESP	Gerard Moreno (loan return from Mallorca)
15	DF	ESP	Víctor Ruiz (on loan from Valencia)
22	DF	SRB	Antonio Rukavina (from Valladolid)
7	FW	ARG	Luciano Vietto (from Racing de Avellaneda)

Out:

No.	Pos.	Nation	Player
—	MF	MEX	Javier Aquino (on loan to Rayo Vallecano)
—	DF	SRB	Aleksandar Pantić (on loan to Córdoba)
—	FW	FRA	Jérémy Perbet (to İstanbul Başakşehir)
—	FW	ESP	Jonathan Pereira (on loan to Rayo Vallecano)
—	MF	ESP	Óliver Torres (loan return to Atlético Madrid, later loaned to Porto)

== Segunda División ==
=== Alavés ===
Manager: Alberto López (2nd season)

In:

Out:

No.	Pos.	Nation	Player
—	FW	ESP	Manu Barreiro (from Racing de Ferrol)
—	DF	ESP	Xabi Castillo (from Las Palmas)
—	FW	SRB	Ranko Despotović (from Sydney FC)
—	DF	ESP	Ernesto Galán (from Las Palmas)
—	DF	ESP	Einar Galilea (promoted from Alavés B)
—	MF	ESP	Juli (from Alcorcón)
5	DF	ESP	Víctor Laguardia (from Zaragoza)
—	MF	ESP	Sergio Llamas (promoted from Alavés B)
1	GK	ESP	Manu (from Alcorcón)
—	DF	ESP	Migue (from Girona)
—	MF	ESP	Marco Sangalli (on loan from Real Sociedad)

No.	Pos.	Nation	Player
—	MF	ESP	Guzmán Casaseca (to Las Palmas)
—	GK	ESP	Iván Crespo (to Tenerife)
—	DF	ESP	Jaume Delgado (to Reus)
—	MF	ESP	Carlos Lázaro (to Hércules)
—	DF	ESP	Samuel Llorca (loan return to Celta Vigo, later loaned to Valladolid)
—	DF	ESP	Luciano (to Coruxo)
—	DF	ESP	Álex Ortiz (to Mirandés)
—	FW	ARG	Mauro Quiroga (to Atlético Rafaela)
—	DF	ESP	Óscar Rubio (to Cádiz)
—	MF	ESP	Emilio Sánchez (to Mirandés)
—	MF	ESP	Óscar Serrano (unattached)
—	MF	BIH	Miroslav Stevanović (loan return to Sevilla)
—	FW	ESP	Borja Viguera (to Athletic Bilbao)

=== Albacete ===
Manager: Luis César Sampedro (3rd season)

In:

No.	Pos.	Nation	Player
—	MF	ESP	Antoñito (from Cartagena)
—	FW	ESP	Chumbi (from Valencia Mestalla)
—	MF	ESP	Sergio Cidoncha (from Atlético Madrid, previously on loan at Zaragoza)
—	DF	ESP	Fran García (from Villarreal B)
—	DF	ESP	Gonzalo (from Avilés)
—	MF	ESP	Portu (from Valencia Mestalla)
—	DF	ESP	Edu Ramos (from Villarreal B)

Out:

No.	Pos.	Nation	Player
—	FW	ESP	Antonio Calle (to Socuéllamos)
—	DF	ESP	José Carlos (to Getafe B)
—	FW	ESP	Borja Navarro (on loan to Compostela)
—	MF	ESP	Raúl Ruiz (to Guijuelo)

=== Alcorcón ===
Manager: Pepe Bordalás (2nd season)

In:

No.	Pos.	Nation	Player
—	FW	ESP	Arturo (on loan from Córdoba)
—	MF	ESP	Carlos Bellvís (from Ponferradina)
—	DF	ESP	Fran Cruz (on loan from Córdoba)
—	MF	ESP	Alberto Escassi (from Hércules)
—	GK	ESP	Ismael Falcón (from Hércules)
—	MF	ESP	David González (from Las Palmas)
—	DF	ENG	Charlie Dean (on loan from Elche)
—	GK	ESP	Víctor Ibáñez (from Almería B)
—	FW	ESP	Máyor (from Las Palmas)
—	DF	ESP	Nagore (from Levante)
—	MF	ESP	Álvaro Rey (from Columbus Crew)
—	FW	ESP	David Rodríguez (from Brighton & Hove Albion)

Out:

No.	Pos.	Nation	Player
—	DF	MTQ	Jean-Sylvain Babin (to Granada)
—	DF	FRA	Samuel Camille (to Ponferradina)
—	DF	ESP	Pau Cendrós (to Mallorca)
—	GK	ESP	Dani Giménez (to Betis)
—	MF	ESP	Javito (to Kerkyra)
—	MF	ESP	Juli (to Alavés)
—	GK	ESP	Manu (to Alavés)
—	MF	ESP	Dani Pacheco (to Betis)
—	FW	ESP	Dani Ponce (on loan to Újpest)
—	MF	ESP	Sergio Prendes (to Leganés)
—	FW	ESP	Jesús Tamayo (to Elche Ilicitano)

=== Barcelona B ===
Manager: Eusebio Sacristán (4th season)

In:

No.	Pos.	Nation	Player
—	MF	ESP	Bicho (on loan from Deportivo de La Coruña)
—	MF	ESP	Juan Cámara (from Villarreal B)
—	DF	SEN	Diawandou Diagne (from Eupen)
30	FW	ESP	Munir El Haddadi (from Barcelona Juvenil A)
—	DF	NGR	Elohor Godswill (from Barcelona Juvenil A)
—	MF	ESP	Gerard Gumbau (from Girona B)
—	MF	CRO	Alen Halilović (from Dinamo Zagreb)
—	MF	ESP	Joel Huertas (from Barcelona Juvenil A)
—	GK	CMR	Fabrice Ondoa (from Barcelona Juvenil A)
—	FW	ARG	Maxi Rolón (from Barcelona Juvenil A)
—	GK	ESP	José Aurelio Suárez (from Barcelona Juvenil A)

Out:

No.	Pos.	Nation	Player
—	GK	ESP	Miguel Bañuz (to Villarreal B)
—	MF	ESP	Edu Bedia (to 1860 München)
—	MF	ESP	Javier Espinosa (to Villarreal)
—	DF	ESP	Sergi Gómez (to Celta Vigo)
—	GK	ESP	Jordi Masip (promoted to Barcelona)
—	MF	ESP	Dani Nieto (to Eibar)
—	DF	ESP	Carles Planas (to Celta Vigo)
—	MF	ESP	Ilie Sánchez (to 1860 München)
—	MF	ESP	Denis Suárez (on loan to Sevilla)

=== Betis ===
Manager: Julio Velázquez (1st season)

In:

No.	Pos.	Nation	Player
4	DF	ESP	Bruno (from Tenerife)
23	DF	ESP	Jorge Casado (from Real Madrid Castilla)
—	MF	ESP	Álvaro Cejudo (from Osasuna)
13	GK	ESP	Dani Giménez (from Alcorcón)
2	DF	ESP	Francisco Molinero (from Murcia)
17	MF	ESP	Dani Pacheco (from Alcorcón)

Out:

No.	Pos.	Nation	Player
—	DF	ESP	Antonio Amaya (to Rayo Vallecano)
—	FW	BRA	Léo Baptistão (loan return to Atlético Madrid, later loaned to Rayo Vallecano)
—	MF	ESP	Juan Carlos (loan return to Braga, later loaned to Granada)
—	DF	ESP	Javi Chica (to Valladolid)
—	MF	NGR	Nosa Igiebor (to Maccabi Tel Aviv)
—	FW	URU	Braian Rodríguez (on loan to Numancia)
—	GK	ARG	Guillermo Sara (loan return to Atlético Rafaela)
—	MF	ESP	Salva Sevilla (to Espanyol)
—	MF	ESP	Joan Verdú (to Baniyas SC)

=== Girona ===
Manager: Pablo Machín (2nd season)

In:

No.	Pos.	Nation	Player
—	MF	ESP	Aday Benítez (from Tenerife)
—	DF	ESP	Miguel Ángel Garrido (on loan from Elche)
—	MF	ESP	Cristian Gómez (on loan from Espanyol, previously on loan at Real Madrid Castilla)
—	MF	ESP	Álex Granell (from Prat)
—	DF	ESP	Pablo Íñiguez (on loan from Villarreal)
—	DF	FRA	Florian Lejeune (from Villarreal, previously on loan at Brest)
—	FW	ESP	Fran Sandaza (from Lugo)

Out:

No.	Pos.	Nation	Player
—	FW	ESP	Chando (unattached)
—	MF	ESP	Bruno Herrero (to Delhi Dynamos FC)
—	DF	ESP	Chus Herrero (to Valladolid)
—	MF	ESP	Moisés Hurtado (unattached)
—	MF	ESP	Jofre Mateu (to Atlético de Kolkata)
—	DF	ESP	Migue (to Alavés)
—	FW	ESP	Alfredo Ortuño (loan return to Granada)
—	FW	ESP	Tato (unattached)
—	MF	ESP	David Timor (loan return to Osasuna, later signed by Valladolid)

=== Las Palmas ===
Manager: Paco Herrera (1st season)

In:

No.	Pos.	Nation	Player
—	FW	ARG	Sergio Araujo (on loan from Boca Juniors)
—	MF	ESP	Guzmán Casaseca (from Alavés)
—	DF	ESP	Christian Fernández (from D.C. United)
—	DF	URU	Marcelo Silva (from Almería)

Out:

No.	Pos.	Nation	Player
—	GK	ARG	Mariano Barbosa (to Sevilla)
—	DF	ESP	Xabi Castillo (to Alavés)
—	FW	NGR	Macauley Chrisantus (to Sivasspor)
—	DF	ESP	Deivid (to Córdoba)
—	DF	ESP	Ernesto Galán (to Alavés)
—	MF	ESP	David González (to Alcorcón)

=== Leganés ===
Manager: Asier Garitano (2nd season)

In:

No.	Pos.	Nation	Player
—	DF	ESP	Carlos Delgado (from Valencia Mestalla)
—	MF	SEN	Pape Diamanka (from Sestao)
—	MF	ESP	Alain Eizmendi (from Real Sociedad, previously on loan at Eibar)
—	DF	ESP	Carlos Gutiérrez (on loan from Las Palmas)
—	FW	ESP	Borja Lázaro (from Almería B)
—	DF	ESP	Rubén Peña (from Guijuelo)
—	MF	ESP	Sergio Prendes (from Alcorcón)
—	DF	ESP	César Soriano (from Avilés)

Out:

No.	Pos.	Nation	Player
—	DF	ESP	Dani Gómez (to Guadalajara)
—	MF	ESP	Carlos Martínez (to Fuenlabrada)
—	FW	URU	Jhon Pírez (loan return to Chelsea, later signed by Getafe B)
—	FW	ESP	Rubén Rivera (loan return to Admira Wacker, later signed by Avilés)
—	MF	ESP	Fer Ruiz (to SS Reyes)
—	MF	ESP	Abel Suárez (loan return to Tenerife, later loaned to La Roda)

=== Llagostera ===
Manager: Santi Castillejo (1st season)

In:

No.	Pos.	Nation	Player
—	DF	ESP	Pedro Alcalá (from Murcia)
—	MF	ESP	Rubén Carreras (from Constància)
—	FW	ESP	Jesús Imaz (from Lleida Esportiu)
—	DF	ESP	Jorge (from Lugo)
—	FW	ESP	Juanjo (from Tenerife)
—	FW	ESP	Sergio León (on loan from Elche Ilicitano)
—	MF	ESP	Joan Pons (from Girona B)
—	FW	ESP	David Querol (from Gimnàstic Tarragona)
—	FW	ESP	Alberto Perea (from Rayo Vallecano)
—	MF	ESP	Óscar Rico (from Jaén)
—	GK	ESP	René (from Jaén)
—	DF	ESP	José Antonio Ríos (from Mirandés)
—	DF	ESP	Ruymán (from Recreativo Huelva)
—	MF	ESP	Robert Simón (from Zaragoza B)

Out:

No.	Pos.	Nation	Player
—	DF	ESP	Óscar Álvarez (retired)
—	FW	ESP	José Flores (on loan to Palamós)
—	DF	ESP	Javi Morales (on loan to Palamós)

=== Lugo ===
Manager: Quique Setién (6th season)

In:

No.	Pos.	Nation	Player
—	FW	ESP	David Aganzo (from Aris)
—	DF	ESP	Albert Dalmau (from Cádiz)
—	DF	ESP	Samu de los Reyes (on loan from Córdoba)
—	FW	ESP	Luis Fernández (on loan from Deportivo La Coruña)
—	MF	ESP	David Ferreiro (from Granada, previously on loan at Hércules)
—	DF	ESP	Borja Gómez (on loan from Granada, previously on loan at Hércules)
—	MF	ESP	Iriome (from Mirandés)
—	MF	ESP	David López (from Brighton & Hove Albion)
—	MF	ESP	Pelayo (on loan from Elche, previously on loan at Córdoba)
—	GK	ESP	Jon Ander Serantes (from Athletic Bilbao, previously on loan at Barakaldo)
—	MF	ESP	Jonathan Valle (from Recreativo Huelva)

Out:

No.	Pos.	Nation	Player
—	DF	ESP	Víctor Díaz (to Recreativo Huelva)
—	DF	ESP	Jorge (to Llagostera)
—	FW	ESP	Juanjo (to Mirandés)
—	FW	ESP	Fran Sandaza (to Girona)

=== Mallorca ===
Manager: (Russia) Valery Karpin (1st season)

In:

No.	Pos.	Nation	Player
—	MF	ISR	Gai Assulin (from Granada, previously on loan at Hércules)
—	MF	ESP	Manuel Arana (from Recreativo Huelva)
—	MF	ESP	Cristian Bustos (from Celta Vigo, previously on loan at Sporting Gijón)
—	GK	ESP	Jesús Cabrero (from Recreativo Huelva)
—	DF	ESP	Pau Cendrós (from Alcorcón)
—	MF	FRA	Alexandre Coeff (on loan from Udinese, previously on loan at Granada)
—	FW	ESP	Fofo (from Ponferradina)
—	MF	SRB	Filip Marković (from Benfica)
—	MF	ESP	Javier Ros (from Real Sociedad)
—	DF	ESP	Enric Saborit (on loan from Athletic Bilbao)
—	FW	SRB	Marko Šćepović (on loan from Olympiacos)
—	DF	ESP	Joan Truyols (from Murcia)

Out:

No.	Pos.	Nation	Player
—	GK	ISR	Dudu Aouate (retired)
—	MF	ESP	David Generelo (to Oviedo)
—	FW	ISR	Tomer Hemed (to Almería)
—	FW	ESP	Álex Moreno (to Rayo Vallecano)
—	FW	ESP	Gerard Moreno (loan return to Villarreal)
—	DF	ESP	Ximo Navarro (to Almería)
—	MF	ESP	Iñigo Pérez (loan return to Athletic Bilbao, later signed by Numancia)
—	MF	GHA	Thomas Partey (loan return to Atlético Madrid, later loaned to Almería)

=== Mirandés ===
Manager: Carlos Terrazas (2nd season)

In:

No.	Pos.	Nation	Player
—	DF	ESP	Javi Cantero (from Enosis Neon Paralimni)
—	MF	ESP	Fran Carnicer (from La Hoya Lorca)
—	GK	ESP	Imanol Elías (from Zamora)
—	DF	ESP	Aitor Fernández (from Hércules)
—	FW	ESP	Juanjo (from Lugo)
—	DF	ESP	Álex Ortiz (from Alavés)
—	MF	ESP	Jordi Pablo (from La Roda)
—	GK	GHA	Brimah Razak (from Córdoba)
—	MF	ESP	Rúper (from Jaén)
—	MF	ESP	Emilio Sánchez (from Alavés)
—	FW	ESP	Urko Vera (from Eibar)

Out:

No.	Pos.	Nation	Player
—	MF	ESP	Iván Agustín (retired)
—	DF	ESP	Javi Flaño (to Osasuna)
—	MF	ESP	Pablo Infante (to Ponferradina)
—	MF	ESP	Iriome (to Lugo)
—	MF	ESP	Juan Muñiz (loan return to Sporting Gijón)
—	GK	CHI	Francisco Prieto (loan return to Colo-Colo, later signed by Ponferradina)
—	DF	ESP	José Antonio Ríos (to Llagostera)
—	MF	ESP	Iñigo Ruiz de Galarreta (loan return to Athletic Bilbao, later loaned to Zaragoza)

=== Numancia ===
Manager: Juan Antonio Anquela (2nd season)

In:

No.	Pos.	Nation	Player
—	MF	ESP	Álex Arias (from Avilés)
—	FW	ESP	Ito (from Avilés)
—	GK	ESP	Munir (from Melilla)
6	MF	ESP	Iñigo Pérez (from Athletic Bilbao, previously on loan at Mallorca)
—	FW	URU	Braian Rodríguez (on loan from Betis)
—	MF	ESP	Gerrit Stoeten (from El Palo)

Out:

No.	Pos.	Nation	Player
—	DF	GEQ	Carlos Akapo (to Valencia Mestalla)
—	MF	ESP	Miguel Bedoya (to Levski Sofia)

=== Osasuna ===
Manager: (Poland) Jan Urban (1st season)

In:

No.	Pos.	Nation	Player
2	DF	ESP	Javi Flaño (from Mirandés)
6	MF	IRI	Javad Nekounam (from Esteghlal, previously on loan at Al-Kuwait)
—	GK	ESP	Roberto Santamaría (from Ponferradina)

Out:

No.	Pos.	Nation	Player
—	DF	ESP	Alejandro Arribas (to Sevilla)
—	MF	ARG	Emiliano Armenteros (to Chiapas)
—	MF	ESP	Álvaro Cejudo (to Betis)
—	DF	ESP	Damià (to Middlesbrough)
—	GK	ESP	Andrés Fernández (to Porto)
—	DF	ESP	Joan Oriol (to Blackpool)
—	MF	ESP	Patxi Puñal (retired)
—	FW	ESP	Oriol Riera (to Wigan Athletic)

=== Ponferradina ===
Manager: Manolo Díaz (1st season)

In:

No.	Pos.	Nation	Player
—	MF	ESP	Andy Rodríguez (from Levante B)
—	DF	FRA	Samuel Camille (from Alcorcón)
—	MF	ESP	Pablo Infante (from Mirandés)
—	GK	CHI	Francisco Prieto (from Colo-Colo, previously on loan at Mirandés)
—	FW	ESP	Rubén Sobrino (from Real Madrid Castilla)

Out:

No.	Pos.	Nation	Player
—	MF	ESP	Carlos Bellvís (to Alcorcón)
—	FW	ESP	Fofo (to Mallorca)
—	MF	ESP	Javi Lara (to Eibar)
—	DF	ESP	Samuel San José (to Racing Santander)
—	GK	ESP	Roberto Santamaría (to Osasuna)
—	MF	ESP	Saúl (retired)

=== Racing de Santander ===
Manager: Paco Fernández (2nd season)

In:

No.	Pos.	Nation	Player
—	DF	ESP	Bernardo Cruz (on loan from Córdoba)
—	GK	ESP	Raúl Fernández (from Athletic Bilbao)
—	DF	ESP	Samuel San José (from Ponferradina)

Out:

No.	Pos.	Nation	Player
—	DF	ESP	Javi Barrio (to Huracán Valencia)
—	DF	ESP	Juanpe (to Granada B)

=== Recreativo Huelva ===
Manager: José Luis Oltra (1st season)

In:

No.	Pos.	Nation	Player
—	FW	ESP	Braulio (from Patriotas)
—	MF	URU	Javier Cabrera (on loan from Montevideo Wanderers)
16	DF	ESP	Víctor Díaz (from Lugo)
—	DF	ESP	Juanan (from Újpest)
—	FW	ESP	Rubén Mesa (from Atlético Madrid B)
—	MF	ESP	Manu Molina (from Valencia Mestalla)
—	MF	GHA	Isaac Nana (from Atlético Madrid B)
—	MF	ESP	Antonio Núñez (from Deportivo La Coruña)
—	MF	ESP	Pedro Ríos (from Levante)

Out:

No.	Pos.	Nation	Player
—	MF	ESP	Manuel Arana (to Mallorca)
—	GK	ESP	Jesús Cabrero (to Mallorca)
—	DF	ESP	Tomás Girón (to Toledo)
—	FW	ESP	Miguel Linares (to Oviedo)
—	DF	ESP	Jorge Morcillo (to Rayo Vallecano)
—	DF	ESP	Ruymán (to Llagostera)
—	MF	ESP	Jonathan Valle (to Lugo)

=== Sabadell ===
Manager: Miquel Olmo (2nd season)

In:

No.	Pos.	Nation	Player
—	FW	ESP	Ariday Cabrera (from L'Hospitalet)
—	MF	ESP	Íñigo Eguaras (from Bilbao Athletic)
—	MF	ESP	Javi Hervás (from Sevilla, previously on loan at Hércules)
—	DF	ESP	Miguel Ángel Riau (from Cartagena)

Out:

No.	Pos.	Nation	Player
—	FW	MEX	Aníbal (to Cruz Azul)
—	MF	ESP	David Arteaga (unattached)
—	DF	ESP	Javi Barral (to Fuenlabrada)
—	DF	ESP	Raúl Goni (unattached)
—	DF	ESP	Toni Lao (to Badalona)
—	MF	ESP	Fernando Llorente (unattached)
—	MF	MAR	Moha (unattached)

=== Sporting Gijón ===
Manager: Abelardo Fernández (2nd season)

In:

No.	Pos.	Nation	Player
—	MF	ESP	Juan Muñiz (loan return from Mirandés)

Out:

No.	Pos.	Nation	Player
—	MF	ESP	Cristian Bustos (loan return to Celta Vigo, later signed by Mallorca)
—	DF	ESP	Roberto Canella (on loan to Deportivo La Coruña)

=== Tenerife ===
Manager: Álvaro Cervera (3rd season)

In:

No.	Pos.	Nation	Player
—	DF	ESP	Unai Albizua (on loan from Athletic Bilbao)
—	GK	ESP	Iván Crespo (from Alavés)
—	FW	ESP	Iker Guarrotxena (on loan from Athletic Bilbao)
—	GK	ESP	Jacobo (on loan from PAOK)
—	FW	ARG	Cristian García (from Godoy Cruz)
—	DF	HON	Juan Carlos García (on loan from Wigan Athletic)
—	FW	URU	Diego Ifrán (on loan from Real Sociedad, previously on loan at Deportivo de La Coruña)
—	FW	URU	Maxi Pérez (on loan from CA Fénix)
—	MF	ESP	Vitolo (from Elazığspor)

Out:

No.	Pos.	Nation	Player
—	MF	ESP	Aday Benítez (to Girona)
—	DF	ESP	Bruno (to Betis)
—	FW	ESP	Juanjo (to Llagostera)
—	MF	ESP	Édgar Méndez (loan return to Almería)
—	FW	ESP	Ayoze Pérez (to Newcastle United)

=== Valladolid ===
Manager: Francesc Rubi (1st season)

In:

No.	Pos.	Nation	Player
2	DF	ESP	Javi Chica (from Betis)
—	FW	ESP	Óscar Díaz (from Almería)
15	DF	ESP	Chus Herrero (from Girona)
8	MF	POR	André Leão (from Paços Ferreira)
—	DF	ESP	Samuel Llorca (on loan from Celta Vigo, previously on loan at Alavés)
9	FW	ESP	Roger Martí (on loan from Levante, previously on loan at Zaragoza)
—	DF	COL	Johan Mojica (on loan from Rayo Vallecano)
—	MF	ESP	David Timor (from Osasuna, previously on loan at Girona)

Out:

No.	Pos.	Nation	Player
—	FW	ESP	Javi Guerra (to Cardiff City)
—	GK	ESP	Jaime Jiménez (to Eibar)
—	FW	SWE	Daniel Larsson (to Granada)
—	FW	ANG	Manucho (to Rayo Vallecano)
—	GK	ESP	Diego Mariño (to Levante)
—	DF	SRB	Stefan Mitrović (loan return to Benfica, later signed by Freiburg)
—	MF	ITA	Fausto Rossi (loan return to Juventus, later loaned to Córdoba)
—	DF	SRB	Antonio Rukavina (to Villarreal)
—	MF	ESP	Víctor Pérez (to Levante)

=== Zaragoza ===
Manager: Víctor Muñoz (2nd season)

In:

No.	Pos.	Nation	Player
—	MF	ALB	Vullnet Basha (on loan from Sion)
—	DF	URU	Leandro Cabrera (from Zaragoza)
—	DF	URU	Carlos Diogo (from Gent)
—	DF	ESP	Mario (from Baku)
—	FW	ESP	Adán Pérez (promoted from Zaragoza B)
—	MF	ESP	Jaime Romero (on loan from Udinese, previously on loan at Real Madrid Castilla)
—	FW	ESP	Pedro Sánchez (from Córdoba)
—	DF	ESP	Rubén (from Baku)
—	GK	ESP	Toño (from Elche)
—	MF	ESP	Iñigo Ruiz de Galarreta (on loan from Athletic Bilbao, previously on loan at Mirandés)

Out:

No.	Pos.	Nation	Player
—	DF	ESP	César Arzo (to Beitar Jerusalem)
—	MF	ESP	Sergio Cidoncha (loan return to Atlético Madrid, later signed by Albacete)
—	GK	ARG	Leo Franco (to San Lorenzo de Almagro)
—	DF	ESP	Álvaro González (to Espanyol)
—	FW	CHI	Ángelo Henríquez (loan return to Manchester United, later loaned to Dinamo Zagreb)
—	DF	ESP	Víctor Laguardia (to Alavés)
—	FW	ESP	Roger Martí (loan return to Levante, later loaned to Valladolid)
—	DF	ESP	Abraham Minero (to Eibar)
—	MF	ESP	Paco Montañés (to Espanyol)
—	MF	ESP	Víctor Rodríguez (to Elche)

== See also ==
- List of Spanish football transfers winter 2014–15
