= List of Spanish football transfers winter 2014–15 =

This is a list of Spanish football transfers for the winter sale in the 2014–15 season of La Liga and Segunda División. Only moves from La Liga and Segunda División are listed.

The winter transfer window opened on 1 January 2015, although a few transfers took place prior to that date. The window closed at midnight on 31 January 2015. Players without a club can join one at any time, either during or in between transfer windows. Clubs below La Liga level can also sign players on loan at any time. If need be, clubs can sign a goalkeeper on an emergency loan, if all others are unavailable.

== Winter 2014-15 La Liga transfer window ==
Date	Name	Moving from	Moving to	Fee
5 December 2014	(Spain) Marco Asensio	(Spain) RCD Mallorca	(Spain) Real Madrid CF	€3,9M
5 December 2014	(Spain) Marco Asensio	(Spain) Real Madrid CF	(Spain) RCD Mallorca	Loan
13 December 2014	(Argentina) Ángel Correa	(Argentina) San Lorenzo de Almagro	(Spain) Atlético de Madrid	€5,6M
18 December 2014	(Spain) Míchel Herrero	(Spain) Getafe CF	(Spain) Valencia CF	Loan return
18 December 2014	(Spain) Míchel Herrero	(Spain) Valencia CF	(China) Guangzhou R&F F.C.	€600K
19 December 2014	(Spain) Jonathan Viera	(Belgium) Standard Liège	(Spain) UD Las Palmas	Loan
24 December 2014	(Spain) José Antonio Espín	(Greece) AEL	(Spain) CD Mirandés	Free
28 December 2014	(Paraguay) Roque Santa Cruz	(Spain) Málaga CF	(Mexico) Cruz Azul	€1,5M
28 December 2014	(Argentina) Pablo Pérez	(Spain) Málaga CF	(Argentina) Boca Juniors	Loan
29 December 2014	(Spain) Fernando Torres	(Italy) AC Milan	(Spain) Atlético de Madrid	Loan
29 December 2014	(Italy) Alessio Cerci	(Spain) Atlético de Madrid	(Italy) AC Milan	Loan
29 December 2014	(Spain) Saúl García	(Spain) Racing de Santander	(Spain) Deportivo de La Coruña	Free
29 December 2014	(Spain) Saúl García	(Spain) Deportivo de La Coruña	(Spain) Racing de Santander	Loan
30 December 2014	(Spain) Carlos Expósito	(Spain) CP Cacereño	(Spain) Recreativo de Huelva	Loan return
30 December 2014	(Spain) Carlos Expósito	(Spain) Recreativo de Huelva	(Spain) Marbella FC	Free
30 December 2014	(Mexico) Miguel Layún	(Mexico) Club América	(Spain) Granada CF	Free
30 December 2014	(Venezuela) Josmar Zambrano	(Spain) Recreativo de Huelva	(Venezuela) Deportivo La Guaira	Free
31 December 2014	(Spain) Borja Fernández	(India) Atlético de Kolkata	(Spain) SD Eibar	Free
1 January 2015	(Spain) Jonathan Pereira	(Spain) Rayo Vallecano	(Spain) Villarreal CF	Loan return
1 January 2015	(Spain) Jonathan Pereira	(Spain) Villarreal CF	(Spain) Real Valladolid	Loan
2 January 2015	(Argentina) Enzo Pérez	(Portugal) S.L. Benfica	(Spain) Valencia CF	€25M
5 January 2015	(Spain) Oriol Riera	(England) Wigan Athletic F.C.	(Spain) Deportivo de La Coruña	Loan
5 January 2015	(Spain) Kepa Arrizabalaga	(Spain) Bilbao Athletic	(Spain) SD Ponferradina	Loan
5 January 2015	(Belarus) Egor Filipenko	(Belarus) BATE Borisov	(Spain) Málaga CF	Free
7 January 2015	(Spain) Benjamín Martínez	(Spain) UD Las Palmas	(Spain) CE Sabadell	Loan
7 January 2015	(Spain) Chuli	(Spain) Real Betis Balompié	(Spain) CD Leganés	Loan
7 January 2015	(Brazil) Edimar Fraga	(Italy) Chievo Verona	(Spain) Córdoba CF	Loan
7 January 2015	(Spain) Cani	(Spain) Villarreal CF	(Spain) Atlético de Madrid	Loan
7 January 2015	(Guinea) Lass Bangoura	(Spain) Rayo Vallecano	(Spain) Granada CF	Loan
7 January 2015	(Spain) Arturo Rodriguez	(Spain) AD Alcorcón	(Spain) Córdoba CF	Loan return
7 January 2015	(Spain) Arturo Rodriguez	(Spain) Córdoba CF	(Spain) UE Llagostera	Loan
7 January 2015	(Honduras) Juan Carlos García	(Spain) CD Tenerife	(England) Wigan Athletic	Loan return
8 January 2015	(Spain) Marc Bertrán	(Spain) Recreativo de Huelva	(Spain) CD Leganés	Loan
8 January 2015	(Spain) Kiko Femenía	Unattached	(Spain) AD Alcorcón	Free
8 January 2015	(Portugal) Bebé	(Portugal) S.L. Benfica	(Spain) Córdoba CF	Loan
9 January 2015	(Belgium) Theo Bongonda	(Belgium) SV Zulte Waregem	(Spain) Celta de Vigo	€1,3M
9 January 2015	(Spain) José Manuel Rojas	(Spain) Albacete Balompié	(Spain) SD Huesca	Free
9 January 2015	(Spain) Javier Paredes	Unattached	(Spain) Albacete Balompié	Free
9 January 2015	(Mexico) Miguel Layún	(Spain) Granada CF	(England) Watford FC	Free
9 January 2015	(Spain) Javier Espinosa	(Spain) Villarreal CF	(Spain) UD Almería	Loan
9 January 2015	(Spain) Raúl Rodríguez	(Spain) RCD Espanyol	(United States) Houston Dynamo	Free
13 January 2015	(Spain) Javi Guerra	(Wales) Cardiff City F.C.	(Spain) Málaga CF	Loan
13 January 2015	(Spain) Carles Gil	(Spain) Valencia CF	(England) Aston Villa F.C.	€6M
13 January 2015	(Spain) Álex Arias	(Spain) CD Numancia	(Spain) Real Avilés	Loan
13 January 2015	(Spain) Ito	(Spain) CD Numancia	(Spain) Real Avilés	Loan
13 January 2015	(Spain) Carlos Indiano	(Spain) Albacete Balompié	(Spain) Hércules CF	Free
14 January 2015	(Spain) Diego Seoane	(Spain) Deportivo de La Coruña	(Spain) CD Lugo	Loan
14 January 2015	(Costa Rica) Celso Borges	(Sweden) Allmänna Idrottsklubben	(Spain) Deportivo de La Coruña	Loan
14 January 2015	(Spain) Francisco Portillo	(Spain) Málaga CF	(Spain) Real Betis Balompié	Loan
15 January 2015	(Spain) Samuel de los Reyes	(Spain) CD Lugo	(Spain) Córdoba CF	Loan return
15 January 2015	(Spain) Samuel de los Reyes	(Spain) Córdoba CF	(Spain) UE Llagostera	Loan
15 January 2015	(Venezuela) Dani Hernández	(Spain) Real Valladolid	(Spain) CD Tenerife	Free
16 January 2015	(Spain) Robert Ibáñez	(Spain) Valencia CF	(Spain) Granada CF	Loan
16 January 2015	(Spain) Raúl Albentosa	(Spain) SD Eibar	(England) Derby County F.C.	€600K
16 January 2015	(Spain) Paco Candela	(Spain) CD Leganés	(Spain) Sevilla Atlético	Loan
16 January 2015	(Spain) Alfredo Ortuño	(Spain) Granada CF	(Spain) UD Las Palmas	Loan
16 January 2015	(Spain) Joselu	(Spain) Recreativo de Huelva	(Spain) RCD Mallorca	Free
17 January 2015	(Spain) José Mari	(United States) Colorado Rapids	(Spain) Levante UD	Free
17 January 2015	(Brazil) Ryder Matos	(Spain) Córdoba CF	(Italy) ACF Fiorentina	Loan return
18 January 2015	(Portugal) Hélder Costa	(Portugal) S.L. Benfica	(Spain) Deportivo de La Coruña	Loan
19 January 2015	(Argentina) Mario Paglialunga	(Spain) SD Ponferradina	(Argentina) CA Tigre	Free
20 January 2015	(Spain) Manuel Lanzarote	(Spain) RCD Espanyol	(Spain) Deportivo Alavés	Loan
20 January 2015	(Uruguay) Cristian Rodríguez	(Spain) Atlético de Madrid	(Italy) Parma FC	Loan
20 January 2015	(Spain) Dani Ponce	(Spain) AD Alcorcón	(Spain) CF Fuenlabrada	Loan
20 January 2015	(Spain) Pol Bueso	(Spain) Albacete Balompié	(Spain) Gimnàstic de Tarragona	Free
20 January 2015	(Spain) Fran García	(Spain) Albacete Balompié	(Spain) Villarreal CF B	Loan
20 January 2015	(Argentina) Emanuel Insúa	(Italy) Udinese Calcio	(Spain) Granada CF	Free
21 January 2015	(Spain) Rubén Pérez	(Italy) Torino FC	(Spain) Atlético de Madrid	Loan return
21 January 2015	(Spain) Rubén Pérez	(Spain) Atlético de Madrid	(Spain) Granada CF	Loan
21 January 2015	(Uruguay) Carlos Diogo	(Spain) Real Zaragoza	Unattached	Free
21 January 2015	(Spain) Natxo Insa	Unattached	(Spain) Real Zaragoza	Free
21 January 2015	(Spain) Germán Parreño	(Spain) RCD Espanyol	(Spain) Racing de Santander	Loan
21 January 2015	(Mexico) Ulises Dávila	(Spain) CD Tenerife	(England) Chelsea FC	Loan return
21 January 2015	(Argentina) Diego Buonanotte	(Mexico) CF Pachuca	(Spain) Granada CF	Loan return
22 January 2015	(Spain) Raúl Fernández	(Spain) Racing de Santander	(Spain) Real Valladolid	Free
22 January 2015	(Cameroon) Dany Nounkeu	(Spain) Granada CF	(Turkey) Galatasaray S.K.	Loan return
22 January 2015	(Mexico) Aníbal Zurdo	(Mexico) Cruz Azul	(Spain) CE Sabadell	Loan
22 January 2015	(Brazil) Lucas Silva	(Brazil) Cruzeiro EC	(Spain) Real Madrid CF	€13M
23 January 2015	(Spain) Xisco Jiménez	(Spain) Córdoba CF	(Spain) RCD Mallorca	Loan
23 January 2015	(Spain) Diego García	(Spain) SD Ponferradina	(Spain) CD Alcoyano	Free
24 January 2015	(Thailand) Teerasil Dangda	(Spain) UD Almería	(Thailand) Muangthong United	Loan return
24 January 2015	(Costa Rica) Joel Campbell	(England) Arsenal FC	(Spain) Villarreal CF	Loan
24 January 2015	(Brazil) Gabriel Paulista	(Spain) Villarreal CF	(England) Arsenal FC	€12M
25 January 2015	(Spain) Manuel Onwu	(Spain) CA Osasuna	(Georgia (country)) FC Dinamo Tbilisi	Free
26 January 2015	(Spain) Juan Carlos Real	(Spain) Deportivo de La Coruña	(Spain) CD Tenerife	Free
26 January 2015	(Spain) Jon Gaztañaga	(Spain) Real Sociedad	(Spain) SD Ponferradina	Loan
26 January 2015	(Poland) Damien Perquis	(Spain) Real Betis Balompié	(Canada) Toronto FC	Free
26 January 2015	(Spain) Robert Simón	(Spain) UE Llagostera	(Spain) UE Olot	Loan
26 January 2015	(Spain) Jason Remeseiro	(Spain) Villarreal CF B	(Spain) Levante UD	Loan return
27 January 2015	(Ivory Coast) Eric Bailly	(Spain) RCD Espanyol	(Spain) Villarreal CF	€5,25M
27 January 2015	(Spain) Ariday Cabrera	(Spain) CE Sabadell	(Spain) Huracán Valencia CF	Free
27 January 2015	(England) Charlie I'Anson	(Spain) AD Alcorcón	(Spain) Elche CF	Loan return
27 January 2015	(England) Charlie I'Anson	(Spain) Elche CF	(Spain) Real Oviedo	Loan
27 January 2015	(Spain) Javi Bonilla	(Spain) CD Numancia	(Greece) Aiginiakos F.C.	Free
27 January 2015	(Spain) Carlos Clerc	(Spain) RCD Espanyol	(Spain) CE Sabadell	Loan
28 January 2015	(Spain) Juan Cala	Unattached	(Spain) Granada CF	Free
28 January 2015	(Spain) Miguel Palanca	(Spain) CD Numancia	(Australia) Adelaide United FC	Free
28 January 2015	(Spain) Álex Fernández	(Spain) RCD Espanyol	(Croatia) HNK Rijeka	Loan
28 January 2015	(Brazil) Cicinho	(Spain) Sevilla FC	(Spain) CD Numancia	Loan
28 January 2015	(Spain) Dioni	(Spain) CD Leganés	(Spain) Real Oviedo	Free
28 January 2015	(Cape Verde) Héldon Ramos	Sporting Clube de Portugal	(Spain) Córdoba CF	Loan
28 January 2015	(Spain) Fernando Usero	(Greece) Asteras Tripolis	(Spain) AD Alcorcón	Loan
28 January 2015	(France) Alexandre Coeff	(Spain) RCD Mallorca	(Italy) Udinese Calcio	Loan return
29 January 2015	(Nigeria) Kalu Uche	(Qatar) Al Rayyan SC	(Spain) Levante UD	Free
29 January 2015	(Brazil) Túlio de Melo	Unattached	(Spain) Real Valladolid	Free
29 January 2015	(Portugal) João Pereira	(Spain) Valencia CF	(Germany) Hannover 96	Free
29 January 2015	(Spain) Iván Ramis	(England) Wigan Athletic	(Spain) Levante UD	Free
29 January 2015	(Spain) Héctor Rodas	(Spain) Levante UD	(Spain) Real Betis Balompié	Free
29 January 2015	(Portugal) Daniel Candeias	(Portugal) S.L. Benfica	(Spain) Granada CF	Loan
29 January 2015	(Spain) Erik Morán	(Spain) Athletic Club de Bilbao	(Spain) CD Leganés	Loan
29 January 2015	(Spain) Borja López	(France) AS Monaco	(Spain) Deportivo de La Coruña	Loan
29 January 2015	(Spain) Miguel de las Cuevas	(Spain) CA Osasuna	(Italy) Spezia Calcio 1906	Free
30 January 2015	(Argentina) Diego Buonanotte	(Spain) Granada CF	(Argentina) Quilmes AC	Loan
30 January 2015	(Spain) Víctor Pérez	(Spain) Levante UD	(Spain) Real Valladolid	Loan return
30 January 2015	(Chile) Bryan Rabello	(Switzerland) FC Luzern	(Spain) Sevilla FC	Loan return
30 January 2015	(Chile) Bryan Rabello	(Spain) Sevilla FC	(Spain) CD Leganés	Loan
30 January 2015	(Argentina) Pablo Caballero	(Argentina) Ferro Carril Oeste	(Spain) CD Lugo	Free
30 January 2015	(Spain) Toni Rodriguez	(United States) Sporting Kansas City	(Spain) CD Lugo	Free
30 January 2015	(Argentina) Bruno Zuculini	(Spain) Valencia CF	(England) Manchester City F.C.	Loan return
30 January 2015	(Argentina) Bruno Zuculini	(England) Manchester City F.C.	(Spain) Córdoba CF	Loan
30 January 2015	(Spain) Carlos Álvarez	(Spain) CD Leganés	(Spain) Real Murcia	Free
30 January 2015	(Spain) Quique González	(Spain) UD Almería	(Spain) Racing de Santander	Loan
30 January 2015	(Spain) Gonzalo Melero	(Spain) Real Madrid Castilla	(Spain) SD Ponferradina	Free
30 January 2015	(Democratic Republic of the Congo) Cedrick Mabwati	(Spain) CA Osasuna	(Spain) Real Betis Balompié	Loan return
30 January 2015	(Democratic Republic of the Congo) Cedrick Mabwati	(Spain) Real Betis Balompié	(United States) Columbus Crew SC	Free
30 January 2015	(Democratic Republic of the Congo) Cedrick Mabwati	(United States) Columbus Crew SC	(Spain) CA Osasuna	Loan
30 January 2015	(Slovenia) Rene Krhin	(Italy) Inter Milan	(Spain) Córdoba CF	Loan
30 January 2015	(Spain) Abdón Prats	(Spain) RCD Mallorca	(Spain) CD Tenerife	Loan
30 January 2015	(Spain) Maikel Mesa	(Spain) CA Osasuna	(Spain) Racing de Ferrol	Loan
30 January 2015	(Spain) Héctor Yuste	(Spain) Granada CF	(Spain) RCD Mallorca	Loan
30 January 2015	(Paraguay) Hernán Pérez	(Spain) Villarreal CF	(Spain) Real Valladolid	Loan
30 January 2015	(Spain) Jacobo Sanz	(Spain) CD Tenerife	(Greece) PAOK	Loan return
30 January 2015	(Spain) Óscar Rico	(Spain) UE Llagostera	(Spain) Reus Deportiu	Free
30 January 2015	(Spain) Adrián Colunga	(England) Brighton & Hove Albion F.C.	(Spain) Granada CF	Loan
30 January 2015	(Sweden) Daniel Larsson	(Spain) Granada CF	(Denmark) Esbjerg fB	Loan
30 January 2015	(Spain) José Manuel Casado	(Spain) Málaga CF	(Spain) UD Almería	Free
30 January 2015	(Spain) Carlos Caballero	(Spain) Córdoba CF	(Greece) Veria FC	Loan
1 February 2015	(Portugal) Vitorino Antunes	(Spain) Málaga CF	(Ukraine) Dynamo Kyiv	€6M
1 February 2015	(Venezuela) Miku	Unattached	(Spain) Rayo Vallecano	Free
1 February 2015	(Spain) Sergio Rodríguez	(Spain) Real Betis Balompié	(Spain) Gimnàstic de Tarragona	Loan
2 February 2015	(Morocco) Zakarya Bergdich	(Spain) Real Valladolid	(Italy) Genoa C.F.C.	Loan
2 February 2015	(Spain) Nono	(Spain) Real Betis Balompié	(Germany) SV Sandhausen	Loan
5 February 2015	(France) Modibo Diakité	(Spain) Deportivo de La Coruña	(Italy) Cagliari Calcio	Free
5 February 2015	(Colombia) Jeison Murillo	(Spain) Granada CF	(Italy) Internazionale Milano	€8M
5 February 2015	(Colombia) Jeison Murillo	(Italy) Internazionale Milano	(Spain) Granada CF	Loan
10 February 2015	(Spain) Jaime Gavilán	(Spain) Levante UD	(Greece) Platanias F.C.	Free
12 February 2015	(Morocco) Issam El Adoua	(Spain) Levante UD	(China) Chongqing Lifan F.C.	Free
18 February 2015	(Belgium) Gaby Mudingayi	(Spain) Elche CF	(Italy) A.C. Cesena	Free
18 February 2015	(Spain) Aritz López Garai	(Spain) Córdoba CF	(Romania) FC Rapid București	Free
19 February 2015	(Spain) Carlos Aranda	(Spain) CD Numancia	Unattached	Free
25 February 2015	(Serbia) Strahinja Karišić	(Serbia) FK Rad Belgrade	(Spain) Granada CF	Free
25 February 2015	(Serbia) Strahinja Karišić	(Spain) Granada CF	(Serbia) FK Rad Belgrade	Loan return
25 February 2015	(Croatia) Sammir	(Spain) Getafe CF	(China) Jiangsu Guoxin-Sainty F.C.	€5M
26 February 2015	(Serbia) Marko Šćepović	(Spain) RCD Mallorca	(Greece) Olympiacos F.C.	Loan return
2 March 2015	(Japan) Mike Havenaar	(Spain) Córdoba CF	(Finland) HJK Helsinki	Free
2 March 2015	(Uruguay) Braian Rodríguez	(Spain) CD Numancia	(Spain) Real Betis Balompié	Loan return
2 March 2015	(Uruguay) Braian Rodríguez	(Spain) Real Betis Balompié	(Brazil) Grêmio Foot-Ball Porto Alegrense	Loan
5 March 2015	(Spain) Albert Riera	Unattached	(Spain) RCD Mallorca	Free
5 March 2015	(Spain) Israel Puerto	(Spain) Villarreal CF B	(Spain) CD Lugo	Free
9 March 2015	(Uruguay) Cristian Rodríguez	(Italy) Parma FC	(Spain) Atlético de Madrid	Loan return
9 March 2015	(Uruguay) Cristian Rodríguez	(Spain) Atlético de Madrid	(Brazil) Grêmio Foot-Ball Porto Alegrense	Loan
17 March 2015	(Spain) David González	(Spain) AD Alcorcón	(Spain) Hércules CF	Free
28 March 2015	(Mexico) Andrés Guardado	(Netherlands) PSV Eindhoven	(Spain) Valencia CF	Loan return
28 March 2015	(Mexico) Andrés Guardado	(Spain) Valencia CF	(Netherlands) PSV Eindhoven	€2,8M
27 March 2015	(Senegal) Mamadou Sylla	(Spain) RCD Espanyol B	(Spain) Racing de Santander	Loan
28 March 2015	(Spain) Víctor Pérez	(Spain) Real Valladolid	(United States) Chicago Fire	Loan
31 March 2015	(Brazil) Danilo	(Portugal) FC Porto	(Spain) Real Madrid CF	€31,5M
31 March 2015	(Brazil) Danilo	(Spain) Real Madrid CF	(Portugal) FC Porto	Loan
9 April 2015	(Spain) Juanto Ortuño	(Spain) CE Sabadell	(Spain) UCAM Murcia CF	Free
10 April 2015	(Cape Verde) Valdo	Unattached	(Spain) Racing de Santander	Free
27 April 2015	(Spain) José Ángel Crespo	(Spain) Córdoba CF	(Italy) Bologna F.C. 1909	Loan return
27 April 2015	(Spain) José Ángel Crespo	(Italy) Bologna F.C. 1909	(Spain) Córdoba CF	Free
4 May 2015	(Morocco) Nordin Amrabat	(Spain) Málaga CF	(Turkey) Galatasaray S.K.	Loan return
4 May 2015	(Morocco) Nordin Amrabat	(Turkey) Galatasaray S.K.	(Spain) Málaga CF	€3,5M
8 May 2015	(Argentina) Bruno Zuculini	(Spain) Córdoba CF	(England) Manchester City F.C.	Loan return
8 May 2015	(Uruguay) Cristian Rodríguez	(Brazil) Grêmio Foot-Ball Porto Alegrense	(Spain) Atlético de Madrid	Loan return
8 May 2015	(Spain) Pablo Hervías	(Spain) Real Sociedad	(Spain) CA Osasuna	Loan
