= 2005 Copa del Rey Juvenil =

Tournament details
- Country: Spain
- Teams: 16

Final positions
- Champions: FC Barcelona
- Runners-up: Sporting de Gijón

Tournament statistics
- Matches played: 29
- Goals scored: 78 (2.69 per match)

The 2005 Copa del Rey Juvenil was the 55th staging of the tournament. The competition began on May 15, 2005, and ended on June 26, 2005, with the final.

== First round ==
Team 1	Agg.	Team 2	1st leg	2nd leg
Osasuna	1–2	Pontevedra	1–0	0–2
Antiguoko	2–3	Sporting de Gijón	2–1	0–2
Athletic Bilbao	5–3	Racing de Santander	2–0	3–3
Betis	3–4	FC Barcelona	2–0	1–4
Sevilla	2–2 (p)	Valencia	1–1	1–1
Vecindario	4–4 (a)	Atlético Madrid	2–0	2–4
Espanyol	4–5	Mallorca	4–2	0–3
Córdoba	0–3	Rayo Vallecano	0–0	0–3

== Quarterfinals ==
Team 1	Agg.	Team 2	1st leg	2nd leg
FC Barcelona	2–1	Mallorca	1–0	1–1
Sevilla	2–1	Pontevedra	2–1	0–0
Sporting de Gijón	4–2	Athletic Bilbao	3–1	1–1
Rayo Vallecano	3–2	Vecindario	2–1	1–1

== Semifinals ==
Team 1	Agg.	Team 2	1st leg	2nd leg
Sevilla	3–3 (a)	FC Barcelona	3–1	0–2
Sporting de Gijón	3–3 (a)	Rayo Vallecano	1–1	2–2

== Final ==
26 June 2005
12:00

FC Barcelona	2–0	Sporting de Gijón
Riera 54'; Pedro 90'	Report

Nou Sardenya, Barcelona
Referee: Clos Gómez

FC Barcelona:
GK	(Spain) Miguel Ramos
DF	(Spain) Carlos Alonso
DF	(Spain) Marc Valiente
DF	(Spain) Roger Giribet
DF	(Spain) José Manuel Casado
MF	(Spain) Julio de Dios (substituted off) 78'
MF	(Spain) Lluís Sastre
MF	(Spain) Toni Calvo (substituted off) 28'
MF	(Spain) Víctor Vázquez
FW	(Spain) Paco Montañés
FW	(Spain) Sito Riera (substituted off) 70'
Substitutes:
FW	(Spain) Pedro (yellow card) (substituted on) 28'
MF	(Spain) Ramón Masó (substituted on) 70'
MF	(Cameroon) Franck Songo'o (substituted on) 78'
Manager:
(Spain) Juan Carlos Rojo

Sporting de Gijón:
GK	(Spain) Gregorio Ciudad Real
DF	(Spain) Noel Alonso (substituted off) 46'
DF	(Spain) Fuentes (substituted off) 57'
DF	(Spain) Javier Rochela
DF	(Spain) Jony López (yellow card)
MF	(Spain) Marcos Landeira (yellow card)
MF	(Spain) Pablo Acebal (substituted off) 56'
MF	(Spain) Sergio Prendes
MF	(Spain) Pablo de Lucas (yellow card)
FW	(Spain) Carlinos
FW	(Spain) Luis Morán
Substitutes:
MF	(Spain) Saúl (substituted on) 46'
MF	(Spain) Jony Iglesias (substituted on) 56'
FW	(Spain) Roberto (substituted on) 57'
Manager:
(Spain) Alejandro Menéndez

Copa del Rey
Winners
FC Barcelona
