= 2005–06 FC Barcelona season =

107th season in existence of FC Barcelona

FC Barcelona
2005–06 season
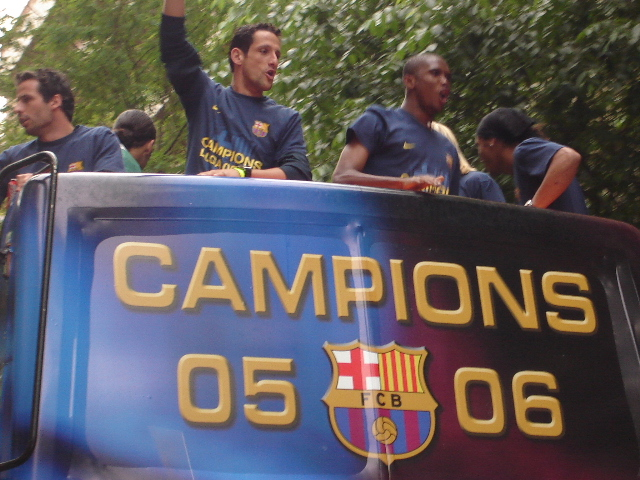
- Barcelona players celebrating the 2005–06 La Liga title
- President: Joan Laporta
- Head Coach: Frank Rijkaard
- Stadium: Camp Nou
- La Liga: 1st
- Copa del Rey: Quarter-finals
- Supercopa de España: Winners
- UEFA Champions League: Winners
- Top goalscorer: League: Samuel Eto'o (26); All: Samuel Eto'o (34)
Home colours	Away colours	Third colours

The 2005–06 season was Futbol Club Barcelona's 107th season in existence and 77th consecutive season in the top flight of Spanish football, La Liga. It was manager Frank Rijkaard's third season in charge of the club, a season in which he managed to successfully retain the La Liga title, as well as winning the UEFA Champions League and Spanish Super Cup. The squad was largely unchanged from the previous season, with only two players – Santiago Ezquerro and Mark van Bommel – joining the club. Gerard left on a free transfer during the summer.

Samuel Eto'o was once again the top scorer for the team, improving on his tally of 29 goals from the 2004–05 season by five goals, including one in the Champions League final. Ronaldinho and Eto'o were selected in the 2005–06 FIFPro XI at the end of the season.

== Squad ==
Squad at end of season

Note: Flags indicate national team as defined under FIFA eligibility rules; some limited exceptions apply. Players may hold more than one non-FIFA nationality.

No.	Pos.	Nation	Player
1	GK	ESP	Víctor Valdés
2	DF	BRA	Juliano Belletti
3	MF	BRA	Thiago Motta
4	DF	MEX	Rafael Márquez
5	DF	ESP	Carles Puyol (captain)
6	MF	ESP	Xavi
7	FW	SWE	Henrik Larsson
8	MF	FRA	Ludovic Giuly
9	FW	CMR	Samuel Eto'o
10	MF	BRA	Ronaldinho
11	FW	ARG	Maxi López
12	DF	NED	Giovanni van Bronckhorst
14	FW	ESP	Santiago Ezquerro
15	MF	BRA	Edmílson
16	DF	BRA	Sylvinho
17	MF	NED	Mark van Bommel
18	MF	ESP	Gabri
19	FW	ARG	Lionel Messi (Note: Messi began the season as a member of the Barcelona B team, wearing number 30. During the season, he was promoted to the first team and given the number 19.)
20	MF	POR	Deco

No.	Pos.	Nation	Player
23	DF	ESP	Oleguer
24	MF	ESP	Andrés Iniesta
25	GK	ESP	Albert Jorquera
26	DF	ESP	Rodri
27	MF	ESP	Pitu
28	GK	ESP	Rubén
29	DF	ESP	Carlos Peña
31	MF	ESP	Joan Verdú
32	DF	ESP	Damià
33	MF	ESP	Jordi Gómez
35	MF	ESP	Cristian
40	DF	ESP	Javi Martos
41	MF	FRA	Ludovic Sylvestre
42	MF	ESP	Paco Montañés
43	DF	ESP	Jesús Olmo
44	MF	ESP	Andrea Orlandi
45	MF	ESP	Ramón Masó

== Coaching staff ==
Position	Staff
Head coach	Frank Rijkaard
Assistant coach	Henk ten Cate / Eusebio Sacristán
Goalkeeping coach	Juan Carlos Unzué
Fitness coach	Paco Seirul·lo / Albert Roca
Doctors	Ricard Pruna / Gil Rodas / Toni Tramullas
Representative	Carles Naval

Source: FC Barcelona

== Transfers ==
=== In ===
No.	Pos.	Nat.	Name	Age	EU	Moving from	Type	Transfer window	Ends	Transfer fee	Source
14	FW	(Spain)	Ezquerro	28	EU	Athletic Bilbao	Transfer ✓	Summer	2008	Free	
17	MF	(Netherlands)	Van Bommel	28	EU	PSV (Netherlands)	Transfer ✓	Summer	2008	Free	

Total spending: ▼€0

=== Out ===
No.	Pos.	Nat.	Name	Age	EU	Moving to	Type	Transfer window	Transfer fee	Source
14	MF	(Spain)	Gerard	26	EU	Monaco (France)	Contract termination ✗	Summer	Free	
10	AM	(Argentina)	Riquelme	27	Non-EU	Villarreal	Transfer ✓	Summer	€7,000,000	
15	DM	(Brazil)	Fábio Rochemback	23	Non-EU	Middlesbrough (England)	Transfer ✓	Summer	€1,500,000	
36	FW	(Spain)	Sergio García	22	EU	Zaragoza	Transfer ✓	Summer	€1,500,000	
22	DM	(Italy)	Albertini	33	EU		Retirement 🔨	Summer	N/A	
7	FW	(Argentina)	Saviola	23	Non-EU	Sevilla	Loan →	Summer	N/A	
35	DF	(Spain)	Fernando Navarro	23	EU	Mallorca	Loan →	Summer	N/A	
27	DF	(Spain)	Óscar López	25	EU	Betis	Loan →	Summer	Free	
32	MF	(Spain)	Damià	23	EU	Racing Santander	Loan →	Winter	N/A	

Total income: ▲€10,000,000

Last updated: 1 September

== Competitions ==
=== Supercopa de España ===
13 August 2005	Real Betis	0–3	Barcelona	Seville
22:00 CET		Report	Giuly 47'; Eto'o 52'; Ronaldinho 63'	Stadium: Estadio Manuel Ruiz de Lopera; Attendance: 25,000; Referee: Arturo Daudén Ibáñez

20 August 2005	Barcelona	1–2 (4–2 agg.)	Real Betis	Barcelona
22:00 CET	Eto'o 14'	Report	Dani 24', 29'	Stadium: Camp Nou; Attendance: 48,000; Referee: Alberto Undiano Mallenco

=== La Liga ===
==== League table ====
Pos	Team	Pld	W	D	L	GF	GA	GD	Pts	Qualification or relegation
1	Barcelona (C)	38	25	7	6	80	35	+45	82	Qualification for the Champions League group stage
2	Real Madrid	38	20	10	8	70	40	+30	70	Qualification for the Champions League group stage
3	Valencia	38	19	12	7	58	33	+25	69	Qualification for the Champions League third qualifying round
4	Osasuna	38	21	5	12	49	43	+6	68	Qualification for the Champions League third qualifying round
5	Sevilla	38	20	8	10	54	39	+15	68	Qualification for the UEFA Cup first round

Source: LFP
Rules for classification: 1st points; 2nd head-to-head points; 3rd head-to-head goal difference; 4th head-to-head goals scored; 5th goal difference; 6th number of goals scored; 7th Fair-play points
(C) Champions

==== Results by round ====
Round	1	2	3	4	5	6	7	8	9	10	11	12	13	14	15	16	17	18	19	20	21	22	23	24	25	26	27	28	29	30	31	32	33	34	35	36	37	38
Ground	A	H	A	H	A	H	A	H	H	A	H	A	H	A	H	A	H	A	H	H	A	H	A	H	A	H	A	A	H	A	H	A	H	H	A	H	A	A
Result	D	W	L	D	W	D	D	W	W	W	W	W	W	W	W	W	W	W	W	W	W	L	L	W	W	W	L	W	W	D	D	D	W	W	W	W	L	L
Position	11	5	8	11	7	5	6	6	5	4	2	1	1	1	1	1	1	1	1	1	1	1	1	1	1	1	1	1	1	1	1	1	1	1	1	1	1	1

Updated to match(es) played on 2008-07-16. Source: LFP.com
A = Away; H = Home; W = Win; D = Draw; L = Loss; = Leader, 2006-07 UEFA Champions League group stage; = 2006-07 UEFA Champions League group stage; = 2006-07 UEFA Champions League qualifying round; = 2006-07 UEFA Cup; = 2006-07 Segunda Division

==== Matches ====
27 August 2005 1	Alavés	0–0	Barcelona	Vitoria-Gasteiz
20:00 CEST		Report		Stadium: Estadio de Mendizorroza

11 September 2005 2	Barcelona	2–0	Mallorca	Barcelona
19:00 CEST	Eto'o 27', 31'	Report		Stadium: Camp Nou

18 September 2005 3	Atlético Madrid	2–1	Barcelona	Madrid
21:00 CEST	Torres 17'; Kežman 46'	Report	Eto'o 6'	Stadium: Estadio Vicente Calderón

21 September 2005 4	Barcelona	2–2	Valencia	Barcelona
21:00 CEST	Giuly 45'; Deco 80'	Report	Villa 52' (pen.), 53'	Stadium: Camp Nou

24 September 2005 5	Real Betis	1–4	Barcelona	Seville
22:00 CEST	Juanito 37'	Report	Van Bommel 19'; Eto'o 67', 77'; Ezquerro 88'	Stadium: Estadio Benito Villamarín

1 October 2005 6	Barcelona	2–2	Zaragoza	Barcelona
20:00 CEST	Ronaldinho 77' (pen.); Eto'o 85'	Report	G. Milito 48'; D. Milito 52'	Stadium: Camp Nou

15 October 2005 7	Deportivo La Coruña	3–3	Barcelona	A Coruña
20:00 CEST	Valerón 10'; Munitis 71'; Castro 86'	Report	Eto'o 40'; Ronaldinho 45', 52' (pen.)	Stadium: Estadio Riazor

22 October 2005 8	Barcelona	3–0	Osasuna	Barcelona
22:00 CEST	Eto'o 46', 52'; Giuly 87'	Report		Stadium: Camp Nou

26 October 2005 11	Barcelona	2–0	Málaga	Barcelona
20:30 CEST	Ronaldinho 81' (pen.); Larsson 88'	Report		Stadium: Camp Nou

30 October 2005 9	Barcelona	5–0	Real Sociedad	Barcelona
20:00 CET	Van Bommel 19'; Ronaldinho 36', 59'; Puyol 70'; Larsson 85'	Report		Stadium: Camp Nou

6 November 2005 10	Getafe	1–3	Barcelona	Getafe
	Pernía 88'	Report	Eto'o 1'; Giuly 61'; Motta 71'	Stadium: Coliseum Alfonso Pérez

19 November 2005 12	Real Madrid	0–3	Barcelona	Madrid
		Report	Eto'o 14'; Ronaldinho 58', 77'	Stadium: Estadio Santiago Bernabéu

27 November 2005 13	Barcelona	4–1	Racing Santander	Barcelona
	Eto'o 30'; Messi 51'; Ronaldinho 56' (pen.); Sylvinho 66'	Report	Casquero 70' (pen.)	Stadium: Camp Nou

4 December 2005 14	Villarreal	0–2	Barcelona	Villarreal
		Report	Peña 23' (o.g.); Deco 62'	Stadium: Estadio de la Cerámica

11 December 2005 15	Barcelona	2–1	Sevilla	Barcelona
	Eto'o 65'; Ronaldinho 77'	Report	Kanouté 62'	Stadium: Camp Nou

17 December 2005 16	Cádiz	1–3	Barcelona	Cádiz
	Mirosavljević 90+1'	Report	Giuly 32'; Eto'o 45+1' (pen.), 48'	Stadium: Estadio Nuevo Mirandilla

20 December 2005 17	Barcelona	2–0	Celta Vigo	Barcelona
	Eto'o 37', 56'	Report		Stadium: Camp Nou

7 January 2006 18	Espanyol	1–2	Barcelona	Barcelona
	Tamudo 60'	Report	Deco 43'; Eto'o 47'	Stadium: Estadi Olímpic Lluís Companys

15 January 2006 19	Barcelona	2–1	Athletic Bilbao	Barcelona
	Ronaldinho 38' (pen.); Messi 50'	Report	Llorente 15'	Stadium: Camp Nou

22 January 2006 20	Barcelona	2–0	Alavés	Barcelona
	Larsson 46'; Messi 86'	Report		Stadium: Camp Nou

29 January 2006 21	Mallorca	0–3	Barcelona	Palma de Mallorca
		Report	Giuly 39'; Messi 75', 82'	Stadium: Estadi de Son Moix

5 February 2006 22	Barcelona	1–3	Atlético Madrid	Barcelona
	Larsson 64'	Report	Torres 32', 75'; Rodríguez 46'	Stadium: Camp Nou

12 February 2006 23	Valencia	1–0	Barcelona	Valencia
	Villa 44'	Report		Stadium: Estadio de Mestalla

18 February 2006 24	Barcelona	5–1	Real Betis	Barcelona
	Larsson 16'; Melli 28' (o.g.); Ronaldinho 33', 58'; Messi 84'	Report	Joaquín 61'	Stadium: Camp Nou

25 February 2006 25	Zaragoza	0–2	Barcelona	Zaragoza
		Report	Ronaldinho 76' (pen.); Larsson 79'	Stadium: Estadio La Romareda

4 March 2006 26	Barcelona	3–2	Deportivo La Coruña	Barcelona
	Ronaldinho 3'; Larsson 33'; Eto'o 61'	Report	Juanma 14'; Andrade 27'	Stadium: Camp Nou

12 March 2006 27	Osasuna	2–1	Barcelona	Pamplona
	Valdo 19'; Puñal 58' (pen.)	Report	Larsson 70'	Stadium: Estadio Reyno de Navarra

18 March 2006 28	Real Sociedad	0–2	Barcelona	San Sebastián
		Report	Larsson 8'; Eto'o 50'	Stadium: Estadio de Anoeta

21 March 2006 29	Barcelona	3–1	Getafe	Barcelona
	Matellán 22' (o.g.); Eto'o 52', 68'	Report	Nano 5'	Stadium: Camp Nou

25 March 2006 30	Málaga	0–0	Barcelona	Málaga
		Report		Stadium: Estadio La Rosaleda

1 April 2006 31	Barcelona	1–1	Real Madrid	Barcelona
	Ronaldinho 21' (pen.)	Report	Ronaldo 37'	Stadium: Camp Nou

9 April 2006 32	Racing Santander	2–2	Barcelona	Santander
	Antoñito 19'; Serrano 23'	Report	Larsson 17'; Eto'o 32'	Stadium: Campos de Sport de El Sardinero

14 April 2006 33	Barcelona	1–0	Villarreal	Barcelona
	Eto'o 10'	Report		Stadium: Camp Nou

29 April 2006 34	Barcelona	1–0	Cádiz	Barcelona
	Ronaldinho 9'	Report		Stadium: Camp Nou

3 May 2006 35	Celta Vigo	0–1	Barcelona	Vigo
		Report	Eto'o 55'	Stadium: Estadio Municipal de Balaídos

6 May 2006 36	Barcelona	2–0	Espanyol	Barcelona
	Jarque 19' (o.g.); Ronaldinho 50'	Report		Stadium: Camp Nou

13 May 2006 37	Sevilla	3–2	Barcelona	Seville
	Dani Alves 22'; Aitor Ocio 24'; Kepa 75'	Report	Ezquerro 41'; Sylvinho 42'	Stadium: Estadio Ramón Sánchez-Pizjuán

20 May 2006 38	Athletic Bilbao	3–1	Barcelona	Bilbao
	Andoni Iraola 57'; Felipe Guréndez 80'; Oleguer 82' (o.g.)	Report	Eto'o 35'	Stadium: Estadio San Mamés

=== Copa del Rey ===
==== Round of 16 ====
3 January 2006 First leg	Zamora	1–3	Barcelona	Zamora
19:30	Xaco 5'	Report	van Bronckhorst 36'; Márquez 80'; Giuly 84'	Stadium: Estadio Ruta de la Plata; Attendance: 11,500; Referee: Carlos Velasco Carballo (Spain)

11 January 2006 Second leg	Barcelona	6–0 (9–1 agg.)	Zamora	Barcelona
20:30	Ezquerro 1'; Larsson 19', 20'; Motta 34' van Bommel 51'; López 80' (pen.)	Report		Stadium: Camp Nou; Attendance: 16,242; Referee: Carlos Velasco Carballo (Spain)

==== Quarter-finals ====
26 January 2006 First leg	Zaragoza	4–2	Barcelona	Zaragoza
20:00	D. Milito 23', 90+3' (pen.); Ewerthon 25', 27'		Larsson 37'; Ronaldinho 61' (pen.)	Stadium: La Romareda; Attendance: 32,000; Referee: Luis Medina Cantalejo (Spain)

1 February 2006 Second leg	Barcelona	2–1 (4–5 agg.)	Zaragoza	Barcelona
21:00	Messi 41'; Larsson 90'		Óscar 66'	Stadium: Camp Nou; Referee: Julián Rodríguez Santiago (Spain)

=== UEFA Champions League ===
==== Group stage ====
Pos	Team	Pld	W	D	L	GF	GA	GD	Pts	Qualification
1	(Spain) Barcelona	6	5	1	0	16	2	+14	16	Advance to knockout stage
2	(Germany) Werder Bremen	6	2	1	3	12	12	0	7	Advance to knockout stage
3	(Italy) Udinese	6	2	1	3	10	12	−2	7	Transfer to UEFA Cup
4	(Greece) Panathinaikos	6	1	1	4	4	16	−12	4	

Source: RSSSF

14 September 2005 1	Werder Bremen (Germany)	0–2	(Spain) Barcelona	Bremen, Germany
20:45		Report	Deco 13'; Ronaldinho 76' (pen.)	Stadium: Weserstadion; Attendance: 42,450; Referee: Terje Hauge (Norway)

27 September 2005 2	Barcelona (Spain)	4–1	(Italy) Udinese	Barcelona, Spain
20:45	Ronaldinho 13', 32', 90' (pen.); Deco 41'	Report	Felipe 24'	Stadium: Camp Nou; Attendance: 85,000; Referee: Stephen Bennett (England)

18 October 2005 3	Panathinaikos (Greece)	0–0	(Spain) Barcelona	Athens, Greece
20:45		Report		Stadium: OAKA Spyro Louis Stadium; Attendance: 70,000; Referee: Frank De Bleeckere (Belgium)

2 November 2005 4	Barcelona (Spain)	5–0	(Greece) Panathinaikos	Barcelona, Spain
20:45	van Bommel 1'; Eto'o 14', 40', 65'; Messi 34'	Report		Stadium: Camp Nou; Attendance: 75,000; Referee: Rene Temmink (Netherlands)

22 November 2005 5	Barcelona (Spain)	3–1	(Germany) Werder Bremen	Barcelona, Spain
20:45	Gabri 14'; Ronaldinho 26'; Larsson 71'	Report	Borowski 22' (pen.)	Stadium: Camp Nou; Attendance: 67,275; Referee: Claus Bo Larsen (Denmark)

7 December 2005 6	Udinese (Italy)	0–2	(Spain) Barcelona	Udine, Italy
20:45		Report	Ezquerro 85'; Iniesta 90'	Stadium: Stadio Friuli; Attendance: 25,000; Referee: Eric Braamhaar (Netherlands)

==== Round of 16 ====
22 February 2006 First leg	Chelsea (England)	1–2	(Spain) Barcelona	Stamford Bridge, London
	Motta 59' (o.g.)	[Report]	Terry 71' (o.g.); Eto'o 80'	Attendance: 39,525; Referee: Terje Hauge (Norway)

7 March 2006 Second leg	Barcelona (Spain)	1–1 (3–2 agg.)	(England) Chelsea	Camp Nou, Barcelona
	Ronaldinho 78'	[Report]	Lampard 90' (pen.)	Attendance: 98,450; Referee: Markus Merk (Germany)

==== Quarter-finals ====
28 March 2006 First leg	Benfica (Portugal)	0–0	(Spain) Barcelona	Lisbon, Portugal
		Report		Stadium: Estádio da Luz; Attendance: 65,000; Referee: Steve Bennett (England)

5 April 2006 Second leg	Barcelona (Spain)	2–0 (2–0 agg.)	(Portugal) Benfica	Barcelona, Spain
	Ronaldinho 19'; Eto'o 89'	Report		Stadium: Camp Nou; Attendance: 89,875; Referee: Ľuboš Micheľ (Slovakia)

==== Semi-finals ====
18 April 2006 First leg	Milan (Italy)	0–1	(Spain) Barcelona	San Siro, Milan
		[Report]	Giuly 57'	Attendance: 76,900; Referee: Alain Sars (France)

26 April 2006 Second leg	Barcelona (Spain)	0–0 (1–0 agg.)	(Italy) Milan	Camp Nou, Barcelona
		[Report]		Attendance: 99,255; Referee: Markus Merk (Germany)

==== Final ====
17 May 2006	Barcelona (Spain)	2–1	(England) Arsenal	Stade de France, Saint-Denis
20:45	Eto'o 76'; Belletti 81'		Campbell 37'	Attendance: 79,610; Referee: Terje Hauge (Norway)

== Friendlies ==
GAMES 2005–2006
23-07-2005 Friendly. East Jutland XI 0–4 Barcelona

25-07-2005 Friendly. Aarhus 0–4 Barcelona

30-07-2005 Friendly. Yokohama Marinos 1–1 Barcelona

03-08-2005 Friendly. Shenzhen Janlibao 0–9 Barcelona

05-08-2005 Ramón de Carranza Trophy (semi-final). Sevilla 1–1 Barcelona (1–3) Penalties.

06-08-2005 Ramón de Carranza Trophy (final). Cadiz 1–3 Barcelona

24-08-2005 Joan Gamper Trophy. Barcelona 2–2 Juventus (2–4) Penalties.

02-09-2005 Friendly. Saint Étienne 2–1 Barcelona

15-11-2005 Copa Catalunya (semi-final). Gimnàstic 0–6 Barcelona

29-11-2005 Friendly. Barcelona 2–1 Israel-Palestine combined XI

15-03-2006 Friendly. Milan 3–2 Barcelona

== Statistics ==
=== Start formations ===
Qnt	Formation	Match(es)
52	4-3-3	All matches

Only competitive matches.

=== Players statistics ===
No.	Pos	Nat	Player	Total		La Liga		Copa del Rey		Champions League	
No.	Pos	Nat	Player	Apps	Goals	Apps	Goals	Apps	Goals	Apps	Goals
1	GK	(Spain) ESP	Valdes	47	-34	35	-29	0	0	12	-5
23	DF	(Spain) ESP	Oleguer	47	0	31+2	0	3	0	11	0
5	DF	(Spain) ESP	Puyol	50	1	35	1	3	0	12	0
4	DF	(Mexico) MEX	Marquez	36	1	25	0	3	1	8	0
16	DF	(Brazil) BRA	Sylvinho	29	2	22+4	2	1+1	0	0+1	0
17	MF	(Netherlands) NED	van Bommel	37	4	17+7	2	2+2	1	7+2	1
15	MF	(Brazil) BRA	Edmílson	39	0	24+4	0	2	0	7+2	0
20	MF	(Portugal) POR	Deco	41	4	28+1	2	1	0	11	2
8	FW	(France) FRA	Giuly	40	7	21+8	5	3	1	6+2	1
9	FW	(Cameroon) CMR	Eto'o	45	32	34	26	0	0	11	6
10	FW	(Brazil) BRA	Ronaldinho	43	25	29	17	2	1	12	7
25	GK	(Spain) ESP	Jorquera	8	-12	3	-6	4	-6	1	0
2	DF	(Brazil) BRA	Belletti	40	1	20+7	0	3	0	7+3	1
12	DF	(Netherlands) NED	van Bronckhorst	36	1	15+4	0	4	1	13	0
24	MF	(Spain) ESP	Iniesta	48	1	14+19	0	4	0	5+6	1
7	FW	(Sweden) SWE	Larsson	41	15	14+14	10	2+1	4	5+5	1
6	MF	(Spain) ESP	Xavi	20	0	14+2	0	0	0	4	0
30	FW	(Argentina) ARG	Messi	25	8	11+6	6	2	1	4+2	1
3	MF	(Brazil) BRA	Motta	23	2	11+4	1	1	1	4+3	0
18	MF	(Spain) ESP	Gabri	18	1	4+7	0	2+1	0	2+2	1
14	FW	(Spain) ESP	Ezquerro	19	4	3+9	2	2+1	1	1+3	1
26	DF	(Spain) ESP	Rodri	6	0	3+1	0	0+2	0	0	0
11	FW	(Argentina) ARG	Maxi López	9	1	2+4	0	0+2	1	0+1	0
27	MF	(Spain) ESP	Pitu	1	0	0+1	0	0	0	0	0
28	GK	(Spain) ESP	Rubén	0	0	0	0	0	0	0	0
29	DF	(Spain) ESP	Carlos Peña	0	0	0	0	0	0	0	0
31	MF	(Spain) ESP	Verdu	0	0	0	0	0	0	0	0
32	DF	(Spain) ESP	Damià	0	0	0	0	0	0	0	0
33	MF	(Spain) ESP	Gomez	1	0	0	0	0+1	0	0	0
35	MF	(Spain) ESP	Cristian	1	0	0	0	0+1	0	0	0
40	DF	(Spain) ESP	Javi Martos	0	0	0	0	0	0	0	0
41	MF	(France) FRA	Sylvestre	0	0	0	0	0	0	0	0
42	MF	(Spain) ESP	Paco Montañés	1	0	0+1	0	0	0	0	0
43	DF	(Spain) ESP	Olmo	1	0	1	0	0	0	0	0
44	MF	(Spain) ESP	Orlandi	1	0	1	0	0	0	0	0
45	MF	(Spain) ESP	Masó	1	0	0+1	0	0	0	0	0
