= José Rojas =

José Rojas may refer to:

- José María Rojas Garrido (1824–1883), Colombian politician and former acting President
- José Rojas (basketball) (1923–1991), Mexican Olympic basketball player
- José Rojas (skier) (born 1970), Spanish Olympic skier
- José Manuel Rojas (footballer, born 1952), Costa Rican footballer
- José Rojas (footballer, born 1983), Chilean footballer
- José Joaquín Rojas (born 1985), Spanish road racing cyclist
- José Manuel Rojas (footballer, born 1987), Spanish footballer
- José Antonio Rojas (born 1987), Chilean footballer
- Jose Rojas (racquetball) (born 1990), American racquetball player
- José Luis Rojas (born 1992), Peruvian runner
- José Rojas (baseball) (born 1993), baseball player
