= Tomás Girón =

Spanish footballer

Personal information
- Full name: Tomás Girón Gutiérrez
- Date of birth: 5 March 1992 (age 34)
- Place of birth: Seville, Spain
- Height: 1.73 m (5 ft 8 in)
- Position: Left back

Team information
- Current team: Gerena

Youth career
- 2002–2008: Betis
- 2008: Real Madrid
- 2008–2011: Sevilla

Senior career*
Years	Team	Apps	(Gls)
2011–2012	Sevilla B	2	(0)
2012–2014	Recreativo B	74	(1)
2014	Recreativo	1	(0)
2014–2015	Toledo	16	(0)
2015–	Gerena	17	(0)

International career
2008	Spain U16	2	(0)
2009	Spain U17	1	(0)
- * Club domestic league appearances and goals as of 12 October 2016

Tomás Girón Gutiérrez (born 5 March 1992) is a Spanish footballer who plays for CD Gerena as a left back.

== Football career ==
Born in Seville, Andalusia, Girón graduated from local Sevilla FC after spells with neighbouring Real Betis and Real Madrid, and spent his first year as a senior with the B-team. In February 2012 he moved to another reserve team, Recreativo de Huelva B.

On 4 May 2014 Girón first appeared for the main squad, starting in a 0–0 away draw against CD Numancia in the Segunda División. On 13 August he left Recre and joined Segunda División B club CD Toledo.
