= Emilio Sánchez (footballer) =

Spanish footballer

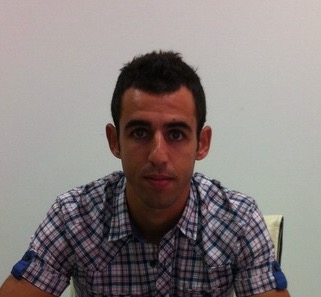
- Sánchez in 2011

Personal information
- Full name: Emilio José Sánchez Fuentes
- Date of birth: 30 April 1985 (age 41)
- Place of birth: Albacete, Spain
- Height: 1.76 m (5 ft 9 in)
- Position: Midfielder

Youth career
- Levante

Senior career*
Years	Team	Apps	(Gls)
2004–2006	Levante B	5	(0)
2004	Levante	1	(0)
2006–2007	Villanovense	32	(2)
2007–2008	Jaén	30	(2)
2008–2009	Alavés	37	(3)
2009–2011	Recreativo	52	(3)
2011–2013	Murcia	62	(13)
2013–2014	Alavés	32	(0)
2014–2015	Mirandés	21	(0)
2015–2016	Llagostera	23	(0)
2017	Doxa	5	(0)
Total		300	(23)
- * Club domestic league appearances and goals

Emilio José Sánchez Fuentes (born 30 April 1985 in Albacete, Castilla–La Mancha) is a Spanish former professional footballer who played as a midfielder.
