= José Manuel Rojas (footballer, born 1987) =

Spanish footballer

Personal information
- Full name: José Manuel Rojas Olmedo
- Date of birth: 10 April 1987 (age 39)
- Place of birth: Seville, Spain
- Height: 1.91 m (6 ft 3 in)
- Position: Centre back

Team information
- Current team: SS Reyes

Youth career
- Atlético Madrid

Senior career*
Years	Team	Apps	(Gls)
2006	Atlético Madrid B	1	(0)
2006–2007	Atlético Aviación		
2007–2008	Talavera	6	(0)
2008	Atlético Pinto	10	(0)
2008–2009	Puertollano	24	(2)
2009–2010	Murcia B	20	(3)
2010–2011	Jaén	31	(2)
2011–2012	San Roque de Lepe	28	(1)
2012–2013	La Roda	24	(0)
2013–2015	Albacete	43	(4)
2015	Huesca	15	(3)
2015–2017	Hércules	31	(1)
2017	Villanovense	16	(0)
2017–	SS Reyes	6	(0)
- * Club domestic league appearances and goals as of 8 November 2017

José Manuel Rojas Olmedo (born 10 April 1987) is a Spanish footballer who plays for UD San Sebastián de los Reyes mainly as a central defender.

== Club career ==
Born in Seville, Andalusia, Rojas was a youth product at Atlético Madrid, making his senior debuts with the reserves in 2006 and going on to appear with several Tercera División and Segunda División B clubs during his early years. In the 2009 summer he joined Real Murcia, but appeared only with the B-team.

Rojas continued to appear in the third level in the following seasons, representing Real Jaén, CD San Roque de Lepe, La Roda CF and Albacete Balompié. With the latter he achieved promotion to Segunda División, appearing in 37 matches and scoring four goals.

On 24 August 2014, aged 27, Rojas played his first match as a professional, starting in a 2–3 home loss against AD Alcorcón. On 9 January, after appearing sparingly, he rescinded his link, and signed for SD Huesca hours later.
