= Damià Abella =

Spanish footballer

Damià
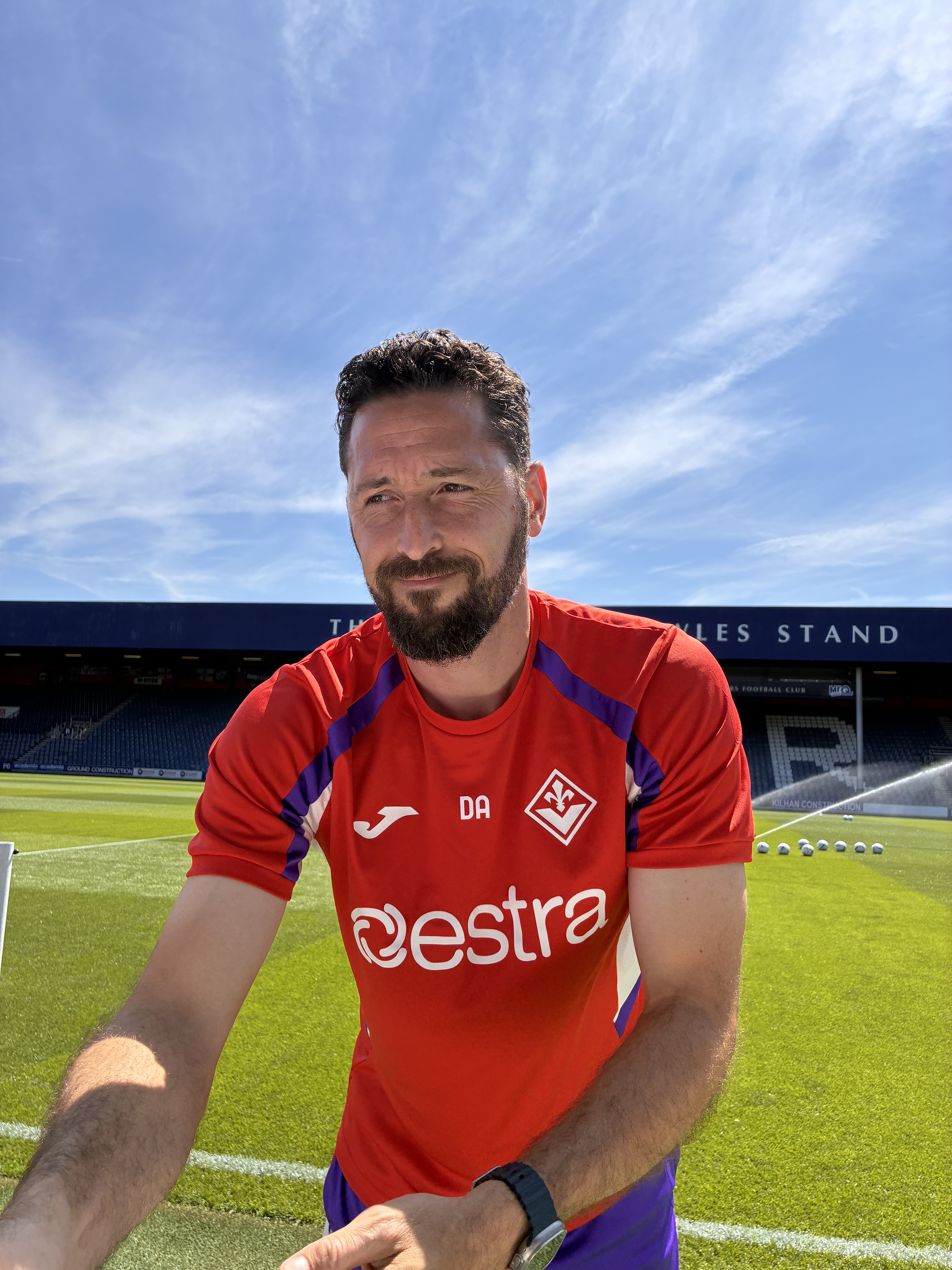
- Damià in 2026

Personal information
- Full name: Damià Abella Pérez
- Date of birth: 15 April 1982 (age 44)
- Place of birth: Olot, Spain
- Height: 1.88 m (6 ft 2 in)
- Positions: Full-back; midfielder

Youth career
- 1998–2000: Ferran Martorell
- 2000–2001: Caprabo

Senior career*
Years	Team	Apps	(Gls)
2001–2002	Peralada		
2002–2003	Valencia C		
2003–2004	Figueres	19	(3)
2004–2005	Barcelona B	22	(0)
2004–2006	Barcelona	9	(0)
2006	→ Racing Santander (loan)	18	(3)
2006–2010	Betis	79	(2)
2010–2014	Osasuna	120	(0)
2014–2016	Middlesbrough	6	(0)
Total		273	(8)

International career
2004	Catalonia	4	(0)
- * Club domestic league appearances and goals

Damià Abella Pérez (born 15 April 1982), known simply as Damià, is a Spanish former professional footballer who played as a full-back.

After starting out at Barcelona, he went on to amass La Liga totals of 198 matches and five goals over nine seasons, also representing in the competition Racing de Santander, Betis and Osasuna. He also spent two years in England, with Middlesbrough.

== Club career ==
=== Barcelona ===
Born in Olot, Girona, Catalonia, Damià's first professional club was local Figueres, for whom he played during the 2003–04 season, in the Segunda División B. He was subsequently acquired by national giants Barcelona, being assigned to its B side.

Due to many injuries to the main squad, Damià made his La Liga debut for Barça's first team against Athletic Bilbao on 30 October 2004, playing 90 minutes in a 1–1 away draw as right-back. However, he could never break into the main squad, finishing the campaign with ten competitive games while continuing to appear for the reserves.

In January 2006, Damià joined Racing de Santander on a one-and-a-half-year loan. He mainly operated at the position he knew from Barcelona B, right midfielder, and scored his first top-flight goal on 12 February in a 2–0 away win over Espanyol, eventually helping the Cantabrians to narrowly avoid relegation while starting 15 matches.

=== Betis ===
In summer 2006, Real Betis signed Damià on a five-year contract for €1 million; although Racing had agreed with Barcelona that the player would stay with them for the duration of the loan arrangement, they decided not to block the move, but a serious hip injury, contracted while still with in Santander, Santander, meant that he would be unregistered for the entire length of 2006–07. He made his competitive debut on 30 September 2007, playing as right-back in a 3–0 home defeat of Mallorca after having successfully undergone surgery in the United States.

Damià netted his first goals for the Andalusians in 2008–09, in consecutive matches early into the campaign (2–1 loss at Villarreal, 3–0 home win against Mallorca), but the club suffered relegation after nine years.

=== Osasuna ===
In late July 2010, after Betis' unsuccessful attempt in regaining their lost status, Damià joined Osasuna. He went on to spend several seasons in that tier, almost exclusively as a left-back in spite of being right-footed.

=== Middlesbrough ===
On 16 August 2014, Damià joined Middlesbrough of the Football League Championship on a free transfer, signed by his compatriot Aitor Karanka. He received international clearance just hours before his debut against Leeds United at Elland Road, playing the full 90 minutes of a 1–0 defeat.

Damià left the Riverside Stadium in May 2016, upon the expiration of his contract. He appeared in only seven competitive games during his spell, and decided to retire at 34 soon afterwards.

== Honours ==
Barcelona

- La Liga: 2004–05
