= Ito (footballer, born 1992) =

Spanish footballer

Personal information
- Full name: Jorge Delgado Figaldo
- Date of birth: 21 April 1992 (age 34)
- Place of birth: Avilés, Spain
- Height: 1.80 m (5 ft 11 in)
- Position: Forward

Youth career
- Avilés

Senior career*
Years	Team	Apps	(Gls)
2010–2013	Avilés B	26	(9)
2010–2014	Avilés	69	(12)
2014–2015	Numancia	2	(0)
2015	→ Avilés (loan)	16	(3)
2015–2018	Barakaldo	61	(10)
2017	→ Levante B (loan)	17	(3)
2018	La Nucía	11	(1)
2018–2019	Portugalete	15	(3)
2019–2020	Gimnástica	24	(5)
2020–2021	Somorrostro	24	(2)
2021–2025	Sámano	77	(10)
- * Club domestic league appearances and goals as of 1 July 2025

Jorge Delgado Fidalgo, commonly known as Ito (born 21 April 1992), is a Spanish footballer who plays as a striker.

== Club career ==
Born in Avilés, Asturias, Ito graduated from hometown's Real Avilés' youth system, and made his debuts as a senior with the reserves in 2010. He subsequently appeared for the main squad in Tercera División, always sharing minutes with the B-side.

On 3 July 2014, after scoring nine goals in the 2013–14 campaign, Ito signed a two-year deal with CD Numancia. On 23 August he played his first match as a professional, replacing Kader in the 80th minute of a 1–2 home loss against Sporting de Gijón in the Segunda División championship.

On 13 January 2015, after appearing sparingly, Ito was loaned to Avilés until June. On 17 July rescinded with his parent club, and signed for Segunda División B side Barakaldo CF hours later.

On 27 January 2017 Ito joined Levante UD, being assigned to the B-team also in the third division.
