= Robert Simón =

Spanish footballer (born 1993)

Personal information
- Full name: Robert Simón Rodríguez
- Date of birth: 22 May 1993 (age 33)
- Place of birth: Badalona, Spain
- Height: 1.75 m (5 ft 9 in)
- Position: Winger

Team information
- Current team: Badalona

Youth career
- Badalona

Senior career*
Years	Team	Apps	(Gls)
2011–2013	Badalona	47	(9)
2013–2014	Zaragoza B	33	(11)
2014–2015	Llagostera	6	(0)
2015	→ Olot (loan)	12	(3)
2015–2016	Espanyol B	26	(1)
2016–2017	Llagostera	61	(2)
2017	Sant Andreu	11	(1)
2017–2021	Badalona	123	(14)
2021–2024	Gimnàstic	62	(6)
2024	Cornellà	15	(2)
2024–2025	Terrassa	28	(0)
2025–	Badalona	4	(0)
- * Club domestic league appearances and goals as of 28 September 2025

Robert Simón Rodríguez (born 22 May 1993) is a Spanish professional footballer who plays as a right winger for Badalona in the Tercera Federación.

== Club career ==
Born in Badalona, Barcelona, Catalonia, Simón began his professional career at hometown's CF Badalona, making his senior debuts in the 2011–12 season, in Segunda División B.

On 15 July 2013, Simón joined Real Zaragoza, being assigned to the reserves in Tercera División. He appeared regularly for the Aragonese side, which were promoted back to the third level at first attempt.

On 11 July 2014, Simón signed with UE Llagostera, freshly promoted to Segunda División. On 10 September, he played his first professional match, starting in a 0–2 away loss against Real Betis, for the campaign's Copa del Rey.

On 26 January 2015, after appearing rarely, Simón was loaned to UE Olot until June. On 22 June, he signed for another reserve team, RCD Espanyol B also in the third level.

Simón was released by the Pericos on 8 July 2016 and immediately returned to his former club Llagostera. The following 31 January, he moved to UE Sant Andreu in the fourth division.

On 17 July 2017, Simón returned to Badalona, still in the third division. He left the club on 4 June 2021, after 175 official matches, and signed a two-year contract with Primera División RFEF side Gimnàstic de Tarragona on 22 June.
