= Óscar Rico =

Spanish footballer

Personal information
- Full name: Óscar Rico Lomas
- Date of birth: 5 December 1985 (age 40)
- Place of birth: Elche, Spain
- Height: 1.77 m (5 ft 9 1/2 in)
- Position: Winger

Youth career
- Levante

Senior career*
Years	Team	Apps	(Gls)
2002–2004	Levante B		
2004–2005	Logroñés		
2005–2006	Almansa	32	(9)
2006–2007	Levante B	11	(0)
2007	Cartagena	9	(0)
2007–2008	Lorca Deportiva	18	(2)
2008–2009	Cultural Leonesa	35	(3)
2009–2011	Alavés	62	(5)
2011–2012	Orihuela	35	(7)
2012–2013	Cartagena	34	(4)
2013–2014	Tenerife	9	(0)
2014	Jaén	19	(2)
2014–2015	Llagostera	7	(0)
2015–2016	Reus	38	(4)
2016–2017	Cartagena	18	(2)
2017	Mérida	15	(2)
2017	Atlético Baleares	8	(0)
2018–2019	Jumilla	28	(3)
2019–2020	Intercity	25	(3)
2020–2022	CFI Alicante	34	(3)
- * Club domestic league appearances and goals

Óscar Rico Lomas (born 5 December 1985) is a Spanish former footballer who played as a left winger.

He played 35 Segunda División matches, for Tenerife, Jaén and Llagostera, but spent most of his career in Segunda División B in representation of 11 clubs, playing 364 games and scoring 44 goals.

== Football career ==
Born in Elche, Province of Alicante, Valencian Community, Rico began his professional career at neighbouring Levante UD, making his senior debut with the reserves in the 2002–03 season, in Tercera División. He first arrived in Segunda División B in 2005, signing for UD Almansa.

Rico spent the following seven years competing in the third level, representing Levante B, FC Cartagena (two stints), Lorca Deportiva CF, Cultural y Deportiva Leonesa, Deportivo Alavés and Orihuela CF. In the 2012–13 campaign he was an important midfield unit for the second club, participating in 22 of the 46 goals scored by the club, assisting in 18 and scoring four himself.

On 28 June 2013, Rico signed with CD Tenerife, freshly promoted to Segunda División. He played his first professional match on 18 August, starting in a 0–1 away loss against AD Alcorcón.

On 21 January 2014, Rico moved to Real Jaén also from division two. After the Andalusian team's relegation he joined UE Llagostera, recently promoted to the second tier.

Rico terminated his contract with the Catalans on 30 January 2015, joining CF Reus Deportiu hours later. In June 2016, after the club's promotion to the second tier, he remained in the third and signed for Cartagena again. He rescinded his contract the following 31 January, to sign for Mérida AD the next day for the rest of the season.

In July 2017, Rico signed for Atlético Baleares. At the start of the new year, he joined FC Jumilla. Following their relegation to the fourth tier, he joined CF Intercity of his native region at that level in July 2019.
