= Samu de los Reyes =

Spanish footballer

Samu
Personal information
- Full name: Samuel de los Reyes Domínguez
- Date of birth: 15 February 1992 (age 34)
- Place of birth: Seville, Spain
- Height: 1.82 m (6 ft 0 in)
- Position: Left-back

Youth career
- Sevilla

Senior career*
Years	Team	Apps	(Gls)
2008–2011	Sevilla C	42	(2)
2009–2013	Sevilla B	55	(3)
2013	Sabadell	14	(0)
2013–2017	Córdoba	30	(0)
2014–2015	→ Lugo (loan)	2	(0)
2015–2016	→ Llagostera (loan)	50	(1)
2018	Sundsvall	9	(0)
2018–2019	Almería	0	(0)
2019–2020	Marbella	10	(0)

International career
2008	Spain U17	3	(0)
- * Club domestic league appearances and goals as of 01:26, 7 March 2023 (UTC)

Samuel de los Reyes Domínguez (born 15 February 1992), known as Samu, is a Spanish professional footballer who plays as a left-back.

== Club career ==
Born in Seville, Andalusia, Samu was a product of hometown Sevilla FC's youth system, and made his senior debut in 2008 at the age of only 16, with the club's C team. He signed a professional contract in 2011, and was promoted to the reserves in the Segunda División B.

On 17 February 2013, Samu cut ties with Sevilla and joined Segunda División side CE Sabadell FC. He made his league debut seven days later, playing the full 90 minutes in a 1–0 away win against Xerez CD.

Samu signed a two-year deal with Córdoba CF on 31 May 2013. He appeared in 25 matches during the campaign, as the Blanquiverdes returned to La Liga after a 42-year absence.

On 21 August 2014, Samu agreed to a new two-year contract, being immediately loaned to second-tier CD Lugo in a season-long move. On 14 January of the following year, he moved to UE Llagostera of the same league also in a temporary deal.

On 12 August 2015, Samu returned to Llagostera in a one-year loan. He scored his only professional goal on 14 February 2016, opening the 2–0 home victory over Albacete Balompié as the campaign ended in relegation from division two.

On 9 February 2018, after seven months without a club, Samu signed a short-term deal with Swedish Allsvenskan's GIF Sundsvall. On 29 June, he returned to Spain and its second division after agreeing to a contract at UD Almería.

Samu spent the first half of the season nursing an ankle injury, and subsequently terminated his contract on 18 January 2019. Three days later, he joined Marbella FC in the third tier.
