= Ramón Masó =

Spanish footballer

Personal information
- Full name: Ramón Masó Vallmajó
- Date of birth: 27 October 1987 (age 39)
- Place of birth: Olot, Spain
- Height: 1.79 m (5 ft 10 in)
- Position: Midfielder

Youth career
- Garrotxa
- 2001–2005: Barcelona

Senior career*
Years	Team	Apps	(Gls)
2005–2007	Barcelona C	38	(1)
2005	Barcelona B	1	(0)
2006	Barcelona	1	(0)
2007–2009	Girona	4	(0)
2008–2009	→ Cassà (loan)	35	(1)
2009–2010	Sant Andreu	14	(0)
2010–2011	Santboià	24	(0)
2011–2012	Olot	25	(0)
2012–2014	Manlleu	35	(1)
2014–2017	Figueres	83	(0)
2017–2019	La Jonquera	55	(5)
2019–2020	Tona	13	(0)
2020–2024	Bosc de Tosca	72	(5)
- * Club domestic league appearances and goals as of 23:46, 7 April 2025 (UTC)

Ramón Masó Vallmajó (born 27 October 1987 in Olot, Province of Girona, Catalonia) is a Spanish footballer who plays as a midfielder.

== Honours ==
Barcelona

- La Liga: 2005–06
