= Sergio Prendes =

Spanish footballer

Personal information
- Full name: Sergio Fernández Prendes
- Date of birth: 15 July 1986 (age 40)
- Place of birth: Gijón, Spain
- Height: 1.82 m (6 ft 0 in)
- Position: Winger

Youth career
- 2003–2005: Sporting Gijón

Senior career*
Years	Team	Apps	(Gls)
2005–2009	Sporting Gijón B	113	(13)
2009–2010	Cudillero	28	(1)
2010–2012	Marino	61	(11)
2012	Alcoyano	0	(0)
2012–2014	Alcorcón	28	(3)
2014–2015	Leganés	22	(1)
2015	Atlético San Luis	6	(0)
2016–2017	Tarxien Rainbows	34	(1)
2017–2018	Caudal	10	(0)
2018–2019	Móstoles Balompié	21	(0)
Total		323	(30)
- * Club domestic league appearances and goals

Sergio Fernández Prendes (born 15 July 1986) is a Spanish former professional footballer who played as a left winger.

== Club career ==
Born in Gijón, Asturias, Sergio began his senior career with hometown's Sporting de Gijón, but spent the vast majority of his six-year spell with their reserves, playing three of his four seasons in the Tercera División. In September 2009, following his release, he signed with neighbouring CD Cudillero in the same league.

In the 2010–11 campaign, Prendes continued competing in his native region and division four, scoring three goals in 28 games to help Marino de Luanco to promote to Segunda División B. In July 2012 he joined CD Alcoyano, but moved to AD Alcorcón shortly after due to a release clause in his contract with his previous club.

Prendes made his Segunda División debut on 8 September 2012, playing roughly 20 minutes in a 3–1 away win against UD Las Palmas. He scored his first professional goal on 28 September of the following year, opening the 2–0 home victory over Deportivo Alavés.

On 18 August 2014, Prendes signed for fellow second-tier CD Leganés. He moved abroad for the first time in his career in July 2015, with Mexican team Atlético San Luis.

Prendes joined Maltese Premier League's Tarxien Rainbows F.C. in the summer of 2016. He subsequently returned to his country's lower leagues.
