= 2024–25 SD Huesca season =

SD Huesca
2024–25 season
- Head coach: Antonio Hidalgo
- Stadium: Estadio El Alcoraz
- Segunda División: 8th
- Copa del Rey: 1/32
- Top goalscorer: League and All: Patrick Soko (13)
- Highest home attendance: 7,968 vs Real Betis (4 January 2025)
- Lowest home attendance: 3,660 vs Eibar (7 December 2024)
- Average home league attendance: 6,085
- Biggest win: Home: 4–0 vs Cartagena; Away: 3–0 vs Real Oviedo
- Biggest defeat: Home: 1–3 vs Racing Santander; Away: 0–4 vs Cádiz
Home colours	Away colours	Third colours

The 2024–25 season is the 65th season in the history of the SD Huesca, and the club's fourth consecutive season in Segunda División. In addition to the domestic league, the team is scheduled to participate in the Copa del Rey.

== Players ==
=== First-team squad ===
As of 31 January 2025

Note: Flags indicate national team as defined under FIFA eligibility rules; some limited exceptions apply. Players may hold more than one non-FIFA nationality.

No.	Pos.	Nation	Player
1	GK	ESP	Juan Pérez
2	DF	ESP	Toni Abad
3	DF	ESP	Jordi Martín
4	DF	ESP	Rubén Pulido
5	DF	ESP	Miguel Loureiro
6	MF	ESP	Javi Mier
7	MF	ESP	Gerard Valentín
8	MF	ESP	Javi Pérez
9	FW	ESP	Sergi Enrich
10	FW	ESP	Hugo Vallejo
11	FW	ESP	Joaquín Muñoz

No.	Pos.	Nation	Player
13	GK	ESP	Dani Jiménez
14	DF	ESP	Jorge Pulido
15	DF	FRA	Jérémy Blasco
16	DF	ESP	Moi Delgado
18	DF	ESP	Diego González
19	FW	CMR	Patrick Soko
20	DF	ESP	Ignasi Vilarrasa
21	FW	ESP	Iker Unzueta
22	MF	ESP	Iker Kortajarena
23	MF	ESP	Óscar Sielva
27	MF	ESP	Javi Hernández

=== Reserve team ===
Note: Flags indicate national team as defined under FIFA eligibility rules; some limited exceptions apply. Players may hold more than one non-FIFA nationality.

No.	Pos.	Nation	Player
28	DF	ESP	Álex Fita
29	MF	ESP	Jaime Escario
30	GK	ESP	Adrián Pereda
31	DF	ESP	Miguel Torguet
32	FW	ESP	Marc Torra
33	FW	MAR	Ayman Arguigue
35	MF	ESP	Axel Bejarano

No.	Pos.	Nation	Player
36	MF	ESP	Álvaro Novials
37	MF	CHI	Willy Chatiliez
38	DF	MAR	Moha Saadouni
39	MF	ESP	Raúl Ojeda
40	GK	ESP	Eloy Moreno
41	DF	ESP	Raúl Alarcón

== Transfers ==
=== In ===
Pos.	Player	Transferred from	Fee	Date	Source
MF	(Cameroon) Patrick Soko	Ibiza	Loan return	28 June 2024	
GK	(Spain) Dani Jiménez	Leganés	Free	28 June 2024	
CB	(Spain) Toni Abad	Eldense	Free	4 July 2024	
RB	(Spain) Diego González	Andorra	Free	5 July 2024	
CM	(Spain) Javi Pérez	Alcorcón	Free	31 July 2024	
MF	(Spain) Javi Hernández	Espanyol	Loan	13 August 2024	
FW	(Spain) Sergi Enrich	Real Zaragoza	Loan	15 August 2024	
FW	(Spain) Iker Unzueta	(Portugal) Vizela	Free	28 August 2024	
LB	(Spain) Jordi Martín	Getafe	Free	29 August 2024	
LB	(Spain) Moi Delgado	Racing Ferrol	Free	31 January 2025	

=== Out ===
Pos.	Player	Transferred to	Fee	Date	Source
DF	(Japan) Kento Hashimoto	Eibar	Free	3 June 2024	

== Friendlies ==
=== Pre-season ===
20 July 2024 Friendly	Tarazona	0–2	Huesca	Tarazona
19:30			Sielva 37'; Kortajarena 88'	Stadium: Estadio Municipal de Tarazona; Referee: Alfonso de Ena Wolf

24 July 2024 Friendly	CA Osasuna	0–0	Huesca
18:30

27 July 2024 Friendly	Huesca	2–1	CA Osasuna B
19:00

31 July 2024 Friendly	Espanyol	1–0	Huesca
19:00

3 August 2024 Friendly	Huesca	0–1	Andorra CF
19:00			Josep Cerda 21'

== Competitions ==
=== Overall record ===
Competition	First match	Last match	Starting round	Final position	Record							
Competition	First match	Last match	Starting round	Final position	Pld	W	D	L	GF	GA	GD	Win %
Segunda División	18 August 2024	1 June 2025	Matchday 1	8th	42	18	10	14	58	49	+9	42.86
Copa del Rey	30 October 2024	4 January 2025	First round	1/32	3	2	0	1	3	1	+2	66.67
Total					45	20	10	15	61	50	+11	44.44

Source: Soccerway

=== Segunda División ===
==== League table ====
Pos	Team	Pld	W	D	L	GF	GA	GD	Pts	Qualification or relegation
6	Almería	42	19	12	11	72	55	+17	69	Qualification for promotion playoffs
7	Granada	42	18	11	13	65	54	+11	65	
8	Huesca	42	18	10	14	58	49	+9	64	
9	Eibar	42	15	13	14	44	41	+3	58 (Note: Eibar finished ahead of Albacete on head-to-head points: Albacete 0–1 Eibar, Eibar 1–1 Albacete.)	
10	Albacete	42	15	13	14	57	57	0	58	

Source: LaLiga Hypermotion
Rules for classification: 1) Points; 2) Head-to-head points; 3) Head-to-head goal difference; 4) Goal difference; 5) Goals scored; 6) Fair-play points
(Note: Head-to-head record is used only after all the matches between the teams in question have been played)

==== Results summary ====
Overall								Home						Away					
Pld	W	D	L	GF	GA	GD	Pts	W	D	L	GF	GA	GD	W	D	L	GF	GA	GD
42	18	10	14	58	49	+9	64	12	5	4	39	25	+14	6	5	10	19	24	−5

==== Results by round ====
Round	1	2	3	4	5	6	7	8	9	10	11	12	14	15	13^{1}	16	17	18	19	20	21	22	23	24	25	26	27	28	29	30	31	32	33	34	35	36	37	38	39	40	41	42
Ground	A	H	A	H	A	H	A	H	H	A	A	H	H	A	A	H	A	H	A	H	A	H	A	H	A	A	H	A	H	A	H	A	H	A	H	H	A	H	A	H	A	H
Result	W	W	W	L	L	W	L	W	D	D	L	D	D	L	L	D	W	W	W	W	D	W	D	W	W	W	D	D	W	L	L	L	W	L	W	L	D	L	L	W	L	W
Position	7	3	1	2	7	4	5	2	3	3	9	9	11	13	13	13	12	9	7	6	7	6	7	7	4	2	3	4	2	5	5	5	5	6	6	7	8	8	8	8	8	8
Points	3	6	9	9	9	12	12	15	16	17	17	18	19	19	19	20	23	26	29	32	33	36	37	40	43	46	47	48	51	51	51	51	54	54	57	57	58	58	58	61	61	64

A = Away; H = Home; W = Win; D = Draw; L = Loss

^{1} Matchday 13 (vs Eldense) was postponed due to the postponed due to the 2024 Spanish floods.

==== Matches ====
The match schedule was released on 26 June 2024.

18 August 2024 1	Elche	0–1	Huesca	Elche
19:30	Febas (yellow card) 13'; Plano (yellow card) 36'; Barzic (yellow card) 42'	Report	Loureiro (yellow card) 24', (goal) 87'; Kortajarena (yellow card) 90+3'; D. Jiménez (yellow card) 90+6'	Stadium: Martínez Valero; Attendance: 15,059; Referee: Daniel Palencia Caballero

23 August 2024 2	Huesca	2–1	Deportivo La Coruña	Huesca
21:30	Sielva 39' (pen.), (yellow card) 90'; Mier (yellow card) 51'; Vilarrasa (yellow card) 61'; J. Pérez (yellow card) 63'; Blasco 90+3'	Report	Navarro 54'	Stadium: El Alcoraz; Attendance: 6,172; Referee: Iosu Galech Apezteguía

30 August 2024 3	Granada	1–3	Huesca	Granada
19:00	Neva (yellow card) 22'; Hongla 59'	Report	Joaquín 21'; Abad (yellow card) 28'; R. Pulido 57'; Sielva (yellow card) 77'; J. Martín (yellow card) 84'; Mier 90+8'	Stadium: Los Cármenes; Attendance: 15,089; Referee: Miguel González Díaz

7 September 2024 4	Huesca	0–1	Burgos	Huesca
18:30	J. Pérez (yellow card) 33'; Abad (yellow card) 47'; Vilarrasa (red card) 52'; Soko (yellow card) 90+1'; R. Pulido (yellow card) 90+2'; Valentín (yellow card) 90+3'	Report	Miguel (yellow card) 59'; Córdoba 77'; Navarro (yellow card) 90+7'	Stadium: El Alcoraz; Attendance: 6,024; Referee: José Antonio Sánchez Villalobos

14 September 2024 5	Málaga	1–0	Huesca	Málaga
18:30	J. Pulido 42' (o.g.); Herrero (yellow card) 60'; Monte (yellow card) 63'; Juanpe (yellow card) 89'	Report	Martín (yellow card) 53'; Abad (yellow card) 62'; Unzueta (yellow card) 90+2'	Stadium: La Rosaleda; Attendance: 26,672; Referee: Saúl Ais Reig

23 September 2024 6	Huesca	4–1	Córdoba	Huesca
20:30	Sielva 13' (pen.); Valentín (yellow card) 25'; Joaquín 29'; Enrich 31'; Sielva (yellow card) 42'; J. Martín 89'	Report	Isaac (yellow card) 33'; Adilson 44'; Genaro (yellow card) 90+1'; Mártinez (red card) 90+6'	Stadium: El Alcoraz; Attendance: 5,899; Referee: Sergiu Claudiu Mureșan

28 September 2024 7	Mirandés	1–0	Huesca	Miranda de Ebro
16:15	Tomeo 38'; Gutiérrez (yellow card) 58'; Gorrotxategi (yellow card) 80'	Report	J. Pulido (yellow card) 19'; Mier (yellow card) 22'; Joaquín (yellow card) 32'; Sielva (yellow card) 42'; Valentín (yellow card) 75'; Arguigue (yellow card) 90+7'	Stadium: Anduva; Attendance: 3,193; Referee: Rubén Ávalos Barrera

4 October 2024 8	Huesca	3–1	Cádiz	Huesca
20:30	Sielva (penalty missed) 25', 45+3' (pen.); Valentín (yellow card) 40'; J. Pulido (yellow card) 45+1' (yellow-red card) 80'; Soko 48'; Kortajarena 62'; D. Jiménez (yellow card) 87'	Report	Matos (yellow card) 24'; Fali (yellow card) 45'; Alejo (yellow card) 45'; Iza (yellow card) 45+3'; Alcaraz (penalty missed) 82'; Fernández (yellow card) 86'; Sobrino 86'	Stadium: El Alcoraz; Attendance: 5,949; Referee: Manuel Pérez Hernández

13 October 2024 9	Huesca	2–2	Albacete	Huesca
14:00	Sielva 29', (yellow card) 77'; Loureiro (yellow card) 36'; Valentín (yellow card) 37'; Enrich 80'	Report	Riki (yellow card) 23'; Lalo (yellow card) 28'; Higinio 38' (pen.) 45+5'; Rueda (yellow card) 69'; Lizoain (yellow card) 81'; Álvaro (yellow card) 85'	Stadium: El Alcoraz; Attendance: 5,722; Referee: Germán Cid Camacho

20 October 2024 10	Racing Ferrol	0–0	Huesca	Ferrol
16:15	Correa (yellow card) 13'; Álex López (red card) 45+2'; Manzanara (yellow card) 45+3'; Jauregizar (yellow card) 47'	Report	J. Pulido (yellow card) 49'; Kortajarena (yellow card) 83'	Stadium: Municipal de A Malata; Attendance: 6,732; Referee: Miguel González Díaz

24 October 2024 11	Sporting Gijón	2–1	Huesca	Gijón
21:00	Caicedo 5'; Gaspar 79'	Report	Mier (yellow card) 35'; J. Martín (yellow card) 43'; Soko (yellow card) 66'; Pier 87' (o.g.)	Stadium: El Molinón; Attendance: 18,690; Referee: Andrés Fuentes Molina

27 October 2024 12	Huesca	2–2	Almería	Huesca
18:30	Abad (yellow card) 3'; Unzueta 9'; D. González (red card) 36'; J. Hernández (yellow card) 45+3'; Vilarrasa 56'	Report	Suárez (penalty missed) 4'; Langa (yellow card) 43'; Centelles (yellow card) 55', (goal) 85'; Arribas 82'	Stadium: El Alcoraz; Attendance: 5,223; Referee: Dámaso Arcediano Monescillo

9 November 2024 14	Huesca	1–1	Real Zaragoza	Huesca
18:30	Valentín 24'; Loureiro (yellow card) 52'; J. Hernández (yellow card) 55'; R. Pulido (yellow card) 63'	Report	Azón 64'; Calero (yellow card) 72'	Stadium: El Alcoraz; Attendance: 6,895; Referee: Jon Ander González Esteban

17 November 2024 15	Cartagena	1–0	Huesca	Cartagena
18:30	Valles 14'; Musto (yellow card) 59'	Report		Stadium: Cartagonova; Attendance: 6,020; Referee: Eder Mallo Fernández

20 November 2024 13	Eldense	2–1	Huesca	Elda
20:00	Piña (yellow card) 42'; Chapela 45'; Mackay (yellow card) 77'; Quintana 79'; Mateu (yellow card) 86'	Report	Enrich (yellow card) 61', (goal) 83'; Joaquín (yellow card) 62'	Stadium: Nuevo Pepico Amat; Attendance: 4,259; Referee: Manuel Ángel Pérez Hernández

24 November 2024 16	Huesca	1–1	Castellón	Huesca
18:30	Loureiro (yellow card) 13'; Pulido (yellow card) 48'; Soko 83'; Mier (yellow card) 89'	Report	Douglas 70'; Chirino (yellow card) 74'; Seuntjens (yellow card) 90+1'; Willems (yellow card) 90+2'	Stadium: El Alcoraz; Attendance: 5,337; Referee: José Antonio Sánchez Villalobos

29 November 2024 17	Real Oviedo	0–3	Huesca	Oviedo
20:30	Seoane (yellow card) 17'; Calvo (yellow card) 55'; Luengo (yellow card) 77'; Hassan (yellow card) 80'	Report	Enrich 15', 48'; J. Hernández (yellow card) 31'; Sielva (yellow card) 63'; Joaquín 81'; Vilarrasa (yellow card) 88'	Stadium: Carlos Tartiere; Attendance: 17,475; Referee: Iosu Galech Apezteguía

7 December 2024 18	Huesca	2–1	Eibar	Huesca
18:30	J. Hernández (yellow card) 12'; Soko 39'; Vilarrasa (yellow card) 52'; Sielva 78' (pen.); Blasco (yellow card) 90+4'	Report	Pascual 9'; Álvarez (yellow card) 43'; Corpas (yellow card) 66', (penalty missed) 90+5'; Carrillo (yellow card) 90+2'	Stadium: El Alcoraz; Attendance: 3,660; Referee: Álvaro Moreno Aragón

15 December 2024 19	Racing Santander	0–1	Huesca	Santander
18:30	Andrés (yellow card) 36'; Maguette (yellow card) 59'	Report	J. Pulido (yellow card) 8'; Soko 68'; Joaquín (yellow card) 73'; Valentín (yellow card) 83'	Stadium: El Sardinero; Attendance: 17,115; Referee: Manuel Jesús Orellana Cid

19 December 2024 20	Huesca	1–0	Tenerife	Huesca
21:15	Soko 35'; Loureiro (yellow card) 66'; J. Pulido (yellow card) 75'	Report	Diarra (yellow card) 71'	Stadium: El Alcoraz; Attendance: 4,638; Referee: Dámaso Arcediano Monescillo

22 December 2024 21	Levante	1–1	Huesca	Valencia
21:00	Andrés (yellow card) 36'; Maguette (yellow card) 59'; Elgezabal (yellow card) 74'; Rey (yellow card) 90+1'; A. García 90+5'	Report	Soko 45'; R. Pulido (yellow card) 49'	Stadium: Ciutat de València; Attendance: 14,738; Referee: José Antonio Sánchez Villalobos

11 January 2025 22	Huesca	1–0	Mirandés	Huesca
16:15	Soko 36'; Sielva (red card) 63'; D. González (yellow card) 90'	Report	Parada (red card) 12'; Tachi (yellow card) 20'; Lachuer (red card) 45+2'	Stadium: El Alcoraz; Attendance: 6,409; Referee: Jon Ander González Esteban

19 January 2025 23	Almería	0–0	Huesca	Almería
21:00	Baptistão (yellow card) 43'	Report	J. Hernández (yellow card) 5'; D. González (yellow card) 34'	Stadium: UD Almería Stadium; Attendance: 9,723; Referee: Salvador Lax Franco

26 January 2025 24	Huesca	4–0	Cartagena	Huesca
18:30	Sielva 30' (pen.); Joaquín 52'; J. Pulido 77'; Vallejo 81'	Report	Aguirregabiria (yellow card) 29'	Stadium: El Alcoraz; Attendance: 5,706; Referee: José Luis Guzmán Mansilla

4 February 2025 25	Castellón	0–1	Huesca	Castellón
14:00	Markanich (yellow card) 68'; Camara (yellow card) 71'; Lottin (yellow card) 90+2'; van den Belt (yellow card) 90+3'; A. Jiménez (yellow card) 90+4'	Report	Loureiro 5'	Stadium: Castalia; Attendance: 10,429; Referee: Marta Huerta de Aza

9 February 2025 26	Córdoba	1–2	Huesca	Córdoba
16:15	Casas 22'; Marvel (yellow card) 45'; Carracedo (yellow card) 70'	Report	Valentín (yellow card) 35'; Loureiro 49'; Sielva (yellow card) 61'; Enrich 67'; Vallejo (yellow card) 71'; D. González (yellow card) 90+1'	Stadium: Nuevo Arcángel; Attendance: 16,278; Referee: Germán Cid Camacho

16 February 2025 27	Huesca	1–1	Granada	Huesca
16:15	Blasco (yellow card) 37'; Soko 76'; Sielva (yellow card) 90+4'	Report	Villar (yellow card) 26'; Ricard (red card) 45+2'; Boyé 84', (yellow card) 89'	Stadium: El Alcoraz; Attendance: 7,427; Referee: Andrés Fuentes Molina

23 February 2025 28	Deportivo La Coruña	0–0	Huesca	A Coruña
14:00	Villares (yellow card) 24'	Report	D. Jiménez (yellow card) 76'; J. Martín (yellow card) 80'; Loureiro (yellow card) 87'; Sielva (yellow card) 90'	Stadium: Riazor; Attendance: 20,714; Referee: Dámaso Arcediano Monescillo

1 March 2025 29	Huesca	3–1	Racing Ferrol	Huesca
16:15	Sielva (yellow card) 16'; Kortajarena 24'; Soko (yellow card) 26', (goal) 36', 50'	Report	D. Jiménez 1' (o.g.); Correa (yellow card) 64'	Stadium: El Alcoraz; Attendance: 5,944; Referee: José Antonio Sánchez Villalobos

9 March 2025 30	Tenerife	2–0	Huesca	Santa Cruz de Tenerife
14:00	Mesa 9'; A. Martín 90+3'	Report	J. Pulido (yellow card) 80'	Stadium: Heliodoro Rodríguez López; Attendance: 8,066; Referee: Iosu Galech Apezteguía

16 March 2025 31	Huesca	1–2	Levante	Huesca
16:15	J. Martín (yellow card) 29'; Loureiro (yellow card) 57'; Joaquín 69'; D. González (yellow card) 89'; J. Pulido (yellow card) 90+8'	Report	Pampín 54', (yellow card) 90+7'; Kochorashvili (yellow card) 87'; Forés 90+1'	Stadium: El Alcoraz; Attendance: 6,833; Referee: Jon Ander González Esteban

23 March 2025 32	Eibar	2–1	Huesca	Eibar
16:15	Bautista 51'; Corpas 56'; Matheus (yellow card) 67'	Report	Chatiliez 78'	Stadium: Ipurua; Attendance: 5,811; Referee: Saúl Ais Reig

30 March 2025 33	Huesca	3–2	Sporting Gijón	Huesca
18:30	Joaquín (yellow card) 45'; Soko 45+2'; R. Pulido (yellow card) 45+4'; J. Pulido 45+8', (yellow card) 90+7'; J. Martín 90+3'	Report	Nacho Méndez 21'; Olaetxea (yellow card) 45+9'; Otero 54' (pen.); Caicedo (yellow card) 74'; Joel (yellow card) 77'	Stadium: El Alcoraz; Attendance: 6,718; Referee: Manuel Jesús Orellana Cid

6 April 2025 34	Burgos	2–1	Huesca	Burgos
18:30	Fer Niño 30', 70'; Álex Sancris (yellow card) 90+8'	Report	Loureiro (yellow card) 62'; Enrich 89'; Sielva (red card) 90+7'	Stadium: El Plantío; Attendance: 10,132; Referee: Andrés Fuentes Molina

14 April 2025 35	Huesca	1–0	Málaga	Huesca
20:30	Abad (yellow card) 71'; J. Pulido (yellow card) 75'; Javi Pérez (yellow card) 86', (goal) 90+7'	Report	Juanpe (yellow card) 41'; Chupete (yellow card) 52'; Puga (yellow card) 89'	Stadium: El Alcoraz; Attendance: 6,661; Referee: Salvador Lax Franco

19 April 2025 36	Huesca	1–3	Racing Santander	Huesca
16:15	Kortajarena 6', (yellow card) 45'; Loureiro (red card) 57'; J. Pulido (red card) 58'; Sielva (yellow card) 70'; Vallejo (yellow card) 80' (yellow-red card) 90+4'; Valentín (yellow card) 85'; Javi Pérez (yellow card) 90+2'; R. Pulido (yellow card) 90+5'	Report	Aldasoro (yellow card) 51'; A. Martín (yellow card) 52', (goal) 83'; Mario 61'; Arana 90+7', (yellow card) 90+10'	Stadium: El Alcoraz; Attendance: 6,953; Referee: Miguel González Díaz

27 April 2025 37	Real Zaragoza	1–1	Huesca	Zaragoza
21:00	Arriaga 49', (yellow card) 64'	Report	Kortajarena 58'	Stadium: La Romareda; Attendance: 21,703; Referee: Iosu Galech Apezteguía

3 May 2025 38	Huesca	1–2	Real Oviedo	Huesca
16:15	J. Pérez (red card) 19'; Valentín (yellow card) 44'; Soko 70'	Report	Abdel Rahim (yellow card) 18'; Cazorla 45+5'; Hassan 62'; Moyano (yellow card) 82'	Stadium: El Alcoraz; Attendance: 6,832; Referee: Dámaso Arcediano Monescillo

11 May 2025 39	Albacete	3–2	Huesca	Albacete
18:30	Riki (yellow card) 37'; Sáenz 39'; Villar (yellow card) 85'; Kofane 90+8', 90+11', (yellow card) 90+12'	Report	J. Hernández (yellow card) 45+3'; Sielva (yellow card) 45+6'; Enrich (yellow card) 49'; Lalo 57' (o.g.); Vallejo 90+5'	Stadium: Carlos Belmonte; Attendance: 8,371; Referee: Eder Mallo Fernández

17 May 2025 40	Huesca	2–1	Elche	Huesca
18:30	Sielva (yellow card) 17'; R. Pulido (yellow card) 31'; J. Pulido (yellow card) 67'; D. González 79'; Unzueta (yellow card) 90+2'; Joaquín 90+3', (yellow card) 90+5'	Report	Valera (yellow card) 12' (yellow-red card) 58'; Núñez 29'; Aguado (yellow card) 58'	Stadium: El Alcoraz; Attendance: 6,194; Referee: Germán Cid Camacho

25 May 2025 41	Cádiz	4–0	Huesca	Cádiz
18:30	Diakité 11'; Melendo 20'; Roger 35'; A. Fernández 39'	Report		Stadium: Nuevo Mirandilla; Attendance: 11,337; Referee: Sergiu Claudiu Mureșan

1 June 2025 42	Huesca	3–2	Eldense	Huesca
18:30	Joaquín 16'; Soko 60'; J. Hernández 81'	Report	Diawara 23'; Vico 45'; Timor (yellow card) 49'	Stadium: El Alcoraz; Attendance: 5,010; Referee: Álvaro Moreno Aragón

=== Copa del Rey ===
30 October 2024 Round 1	Badalona Futur	0–2	Huesca	Premià de Dalt
20:00	P. Hernández (yellow card) 22'; Sami el Mahboubi (yellow card) 31'; Guanini (yellow card) 75'	Report	Unzueta 23' (pen.); Bejarano 64'	Stadium: Estadi Municipal; Attendance: 1,000; Referee: José Sánchez Villalobos

4 December 2024 Round 2	Gimnàstic Tarragona	0–1	Huesca	Tarragona
19:00	Alex Jiménez (yellow card) 47'; Dufur (yellow card) 55'; Álex López (yellow card) 78'	Report	Joaquín 58', (yellow card) 67'; Mier (yellow card) 60'	Stadium: Nou Estadi Costa Daurada; Attendance: 5,142; Referee: Sergiu Claudiu Mureșan

4 January 2025 Round of 32	Huesca	0–1	Real Betis	Huesca
15:30	Pulido (yellow card) 70'; J. Hernández (yellow card) 73'; Valentín (yellow card) 90+5'; Soko (yellow card) 90+5'	Report	Isco 38'	Stadium: El Alcoraz; Attendance: 7,968; Referee: Miguel Ángel Ortiz
