= 2022–23 SD Huesca season =

SD Huesca
2022–23 season
- Chairman: Agustín Lasaosa
- Manager: Cuco Ziganda
- Stadium: Estadio El Alcoraz
- Segunda División: 15th
- Copa del Rey: First round
- Top goalscorer: League: Juan Carlos Real (8); All: Juan Carlos Real (8)
Home colours	Away colours	Third colours

The 2022–23 season was the 63rd season in the history of SD Huesca and their second consecutive season in the second division. The club participated in Segunda División and the Copa del Rey.

== Players ==
=== First-team squad ===
As of 5 February 2023.

Note: Flags indicate national team as defined under FIFA eligibility rules; some limited exceptions apply. Players may hold more than one non-FIFA nationality.

No.	Pos.	Nation	Player
1	GK	ESP	Andrés Fernández (vice-captain)
2	DF	ROU	Andrei Rațiu
3	DF	FRA	Florian Miguel
4	MF	ESP	David Timor
5	MF	JPN	Kento Hashimoto (on loan from FC Rostov)
6	DF	ESP	Ignasi Vilarrasa
7	MF	ESP	Gerard Valentín
8	FW	CMR	Patrick Soko
9	FW	GHA	Samuel Obeng (on loan from Oviedo)
10	MF	ESP	Javi Martínez (on loan from Osasuna)
11	MF	ESP	Joaquín Muñoz
12	DF	ESP	Juanjo Nieto
13	GK	ESP	Juan Pérez

No.	Pos.	Nation	Player
14	DF	ESP	Jorge Pulido (captain)
15	DF	FRA	Jérémy Blasco
17	MF	FRA	Enzo Lombardo
18	FW	ESP	José Ángel Carrillo
19	FW	GAM	Abou Kanté
20	MF	ESP	Cristian Salvador
21	MF	ESP	Marc Mateu
22	MF	ESP	Juan Carlos Real
23	MF	ESP	Óscar Sielva (on loan from Eibar)
24	DF	ESP	Rubén Pulido
27	FW	ESP	Manu Rico
28	DF	ESP	Hugo Anglada
32	MF	ESP	Pablo Tomeo

=== Reserve team ===
Note: Flags indicate national team as defined under FIFA eligibility rules; some limited exceptions apply. Players may hold more than one non-FIFA nationality.

No.	Pos.	Nation	Player
30	GK	ESP	Miguel Ángel Sanz
31	MF	ESP	David García

=== Out on loan ===
Note: Flags indicate national team as defined under FIFA eligibility rules; some limited exceptions apply. Players may hold more than one non-FIFA nationality.

No.	Pos.	Nation	Player
—	GK	ESP	Álvaro Fernández (at Espanyol until 30 June 2023)
—	DF	ESP	Eusebio Monzó (at San Sebastián de los Reyes until 30 June 2023)
—	FW	ESP	Dani Escriche (at Albacete until 30 June 2023)
—	FW	COL	Juan Peñaloza (at Deportivo Pereira until 30 June 2023)

No.	Pos.	Nation	Player
—	FW	ESP	Juan Villar (at Córdoba until 30 June 2023)
—	FW	ESP	Kevin Carlos (at Betis Deportivo until 30 June 2023)
—	FW	ESP	Sandro Ramírez (at Las Palmas until 30 June 2023)

== Transfers ==
=== In ===
Date	Player	From	Type	Fee	Ref
10 June 2022	(Cameroon) Patrick Soko	Racing Santander	Transfer	Free	
5 July 2022	(Spain) Ignasi Vilarrasa	Valladolid	Transfer	Free	
8 July 2022	(France) Jérémy Blasco	Real Sociedad B	Transfer	Free	
14 July 2022	(The Gambia) Aboubakary Kanté	Fuenlabrada	Transfer	Free	
18 July 2022	(Japan) Kento Hashimoto	(Russia) Rostov	Loan		
5 August 2022	(Spain) Óscar Sielva	Eibar	Loan		
5 August 2022	(Spain) Juan Villar	Almería	Transfer	Free	
22 August 2022	(Spain) José Ángel Carrillo	Lugo	Transfer	Free	
29 August 2022	(Spain) Rubén Pulido	Fuenlabrada	Transfer	Undisclosed	

=== Out ===
Date	Player	To	Type	Fee	Ref
1 July 2022	(Argentina) Julio Buffarini	Released			
1 July 2022	(Spain) Mikel Rico	Cartagena	Transfer	Free	
1 July 2022	(Spain) Jaime Seoane	Getafe	Transfer	Free	
2 July 2022	(Spain) Pablo Insua	Sporting Gijón	Transfer	Free	
4 July 2022	(Spain) David Ferreiro	Cartagena	Transfer	Free	
4 July 2022	(Spain) Pedro Mosquera	Alcorcón	Transfer	Free	
22 August 2022	(Spain) Sandro Ramírez	Las Palmas	Loan		
31 August 2022	(Spain) Álvaro Fernández	Espanyol	Loan		

== Pre-season and friendlies ==
Win Draw Loss Fixtures

20 July 2022 Friendly	Huesca	1–1	Osasuna B	Huesca, Spain
19:00 CEST (UTC+2)	Valentín 13'		Rabadan 72'	Stadium: Complejo Deportivo San Jorge

23 July 2022 Trofeo Villa de Mendigorria	Osasuna	4–3	Huesca	Mendigorría, Spain
19:30 CEST (UTC+2)	Yoldi 33'; Moncayola 41'; Barbero 52'; Ávila 87'		Soko 29'; Muñoz 49'; García 77'	Stadium: Estadio El Pontarrón; Attendance: 1,200; Referee: Imanol Irurtzun

27 July 2022 Friendly	Calahorra	0–1	Huesca	Calahorra, Spain
19:30 CEST (UTC+2)			Blasco 17'	Stadium: Estadio La Planilla

30 July 2022 Friendly	Huesca	1–3	Eibar	Tafalla, Spain
11:30 CEST (UTC+2)				Stadium: Campo San Francisco

3 August 2022 Friendly	Gimnàstic	2–2	Huesca	Tarragona, Spain
20:00 CEST (UTC+2)				Stadium: Nou Estadi de Tarragona

5 August 2022 Friendly	Huesca	3–1	Andorra	Huesca, Spain
19:00 CEST (UTC+2)				Stadium: El Alcoraz

16 August 2022 Friendly	Huesca	1–0	Sabadell	Villacañas, Spain
19:00 CEST (UTC+2)				Stadium: Campo De Fútbol Las Pirámides

== Competitions ==
=== Overall record ===
Competition	First match	Last match	Starting round	Final position	Record							
Competition	First match	Last match	Starting round	Final position	Pld	W	D	L	GF	GA	GD	Win %
Segunda División	12 August 2022	27 May 2023	Matchday 1	15th	42	11	19	12	36	36	+0	26.19
Copa del Rey	13 November 2022		First round	First round	1	0	1	0	2	2	+0	0.00
Total					43	11	20	12	38	38	+0	25.58

Source: Soccerway

=== Segunda División ===
==== League table ====
Pos	Team	Pld	W	D	L	GF	GA	GD	Pts
13	Zaragoza	42	12	17	13	40	39	+1	53 (Note: Zaragoza finished ahead of Leganés on head-to-head goal difference: Leganés 2–1 Zaragoza, Zaragoza 3–0 Leganés.)
14	Leganés	42	14	11	17	37	42	−5	53
15	Huesca	42	11	19	12	36	36	0	52 (Note: Huesca finished ahead of Mirandés on head-to-head points: Mirandés 1–1 Huesca, Huesca 1–0 Mirandés.)
16	Mirandés	42	13	13	16	48	54	−6	52
17	Sporting Gijón	42	11	17	14	43	48	−5	50 (Note: Overall goal difference: Sporting Gijón −5, Villarreal B −6.)

Source: LaLiga SmartBank
Rules for classification: 1) points; 2) head-to-head points; 3) head-to-head goal difference; 4) goal difference; 5) number of goals scored
Notes:

Notes

1. Reserve teams are not eligible for promotion to the same league as the first team.

==== Results summary ====
Overall								Home						Away					
Pld	W	D	L	GF	GA	GD	Pts	W	D	L	GF	GA	GD	W	D	L	GF	GA	GD
42	11	19	12	36	36	0	52	9	9	3	23	13	+10	2	10	9	13	23	−10

Source: LaLiga SmartBank

==== Results by round ====
Round	1	2	3	4	5	6	7	8	9	10	11	12	13	14	15	16	17	18	19	20	21	22	23	24	25	26	27	28	29	30	31	32	33	34	35	36	37	38	39	40	41	42
Ground	A	H	A	H	H	A	H	A	H	A	H	A	H	A	H	A	H	A	H	A	A	H	A	H	A	H	A	H	A	H	A	H	A	H	H	A	H	A	A	H	A	H
Result	D	L	L	W	W	L	W	D	D	W	D	D	W	L	W	L	D	L	W	L	D	D	D	D	L	W	D	D	D	W	D	D	D	L	W	L	D	D	L	D	W	L
Position	11	15	17	15	11	15	12	11	10	8	9	10	9	10	7	9	10	11	9	13	11	11	11	12	14	11	10	12	10	9	9	10	10	11	9	12	14	14	17	17	15	15

Source: LaLiga SmartBank
A = Away; H = Home; W = Win; D = Draw; L = Loss

==== Matches ====
The league fixtures were announced on 23 June 2022.

12 August 2022 1	Levante	0–0	Huesca	Valencia
21:00				Stadium: Estadio Ciudad de Valencia

21 August 2022 2	Huesca	2–3	Cartagena	Huesca
19:30				Stadium: Estadio El Alcoraz

26 August 2022 3	Albacete	2–1	Huesca	Albacete
20:00				Stadium: Estadio Carlos Belmonte

4 September 2022 4	Huesca	3–0	Ibiza	Huesca
18:30				Stadium: Estadio El Alcoraz

11 September 2022 5	Huesca	1–0	Málaga	Huesca
21:00	Real 67'			Stadium: Estadio El Alcoraz

18 September 2022 6	Alavés	2–1	Huesca	Vitoria-Gasteiz
16:15				Stadium: Estadio de Mendizorroza; Referee: Raúl Martín González Francés

24 September 2022 7	Huesca	1–0	Leganés	Huesca
				Stadium: Estadio El Alcoraz

2 October 2022 8	Granada	0–0	Huesca	Granada

8 October 2022 9	Huesca	1–1	Lugo	Huesca
				Stadium: Estadio El Alcoraz

12 October 2022 10	Oviedo	0–1	Huesca	Oviedo

15 October 2022 11	Huesca	0–0	Racing Santander	Huesca
				Stadium: Estadio El Alcoraz

22 October 2022 12	Mirandés	1–1	Huesca	Miranda de Ebro

29 October 2022 13	Huesca	1–0	Las Palmas	Huesca
				Stadium: Estadio El Alcoraz

1 November 2022 14	Ponferradina	1–0	Huesca	Ponferrada

5 November 2022 15	Huesca	1–0	Villarreal B	Huesca
				Stadium: Estadio El Alcoraz

19 November 2022 16	Tenerife	2–0	Huesca	Santa Cruz de Tenerife

25 November 2022 17	Huesca	0–0	Sporting Gijón	Huesca
				Stadium: Estadio El Alcoraz

4 December 2022 18	Eibar	2–1	Huesca	Eibar

7 December 2022 19	Huesca	1–0	Andorra	Huesca
				Stadium: Estadio El Alcoraz

10 December 2022 20	Zaragoza	3–0	Huesca	Zaragoza
				Stadium: La Romareda

18 December 2022 21	Burgos	1–1	Huesca	Burgos
				Stadium: Estadio El Plantío

9 January 2023 222	Huesca	1–1	Albacete	Huesca
				Stadium: Estadio El Alcoraz

14 January 2023 23	Cartagena	0–0	Huesca	Cartagena
				Stadium: Estadio Cartagonova

22 January 2023 24	Huesca	1–1	Oviedo	Huesca
				Stadium: Estadio El Alcoraz

28 January 2023 25	Las Palmas	1–0	Huesca	Las Palmas
				Stadium: Estadio Gran Canaria

4 February 2023 26	Huesca	1–0	Mirandés	Huesca
				Stadium: Estadio El Alcoraz

12 February 2023 27	Sporting Gijón	1–1	Huesca	Gijón

19 February 2023 28	Huesca	1–1	Granada	Huesca
				Stadium: Estadio El Alcoraz

26 February 2023 29	Ibiza	2–2	Huesca	Ibiza

4 March 2023 30	Huesca	3–0	Levante	Huesca
				Stadium: Estadio El Alcoraz

13 March 2023 31	Racing Santander	1–1	Huesca	Santander

19 March 2023 32	Huesca	1–1	Zaragoza	Huesca
				Stadium: Estadio El Alcoraz

26 March 2023 33	Villarreal B	0–0	Huesca	Villarreal

2 April 2023 34	Huesca	0–1	Alavés	Huesca
14:00			Tenaglia 72'	Stadium: Estadio El Alcoraz

9 April 2023 35	Huesca	2–1	Burgos	Huesca
14:00				Stadium: Estadio El Alcoraz

16 April 2023 36	Andorra	1–0	Huesca	Andorra la Vella
14:00	Bakış 17'			Stadium: Estadi Nacional

24 April 2023 37	Huesca	1–1	Tenerife	Huesca
21:00				Stadium: Estadio El Alcoraz

1 May 2023 38	Málaga	0–0	Huesca	Málaga
18:30				Stadium: Estadio La Rosaleda

6 May 2023 39	Leganés	2–1	Huesca	Leganés
18:30				Stadium: Estadio Municipal de Butarque

14 May 2023 40	Huesca	1–1	Ponferradina	Huesca
18:30				Stadium: Estadio El Alcoraz

20 May 2023 41	Lugo	1–2	Huesca	Lugo
18:30				Stadium: Estadio Anxo Carro

27 May 2023 42	Huesca	0–1	Eibar	Huesca
21:00			Matheus Pereira 82'	Stadium: Estadio El Alcoraz
