= Aragonese derby =

Association football matches

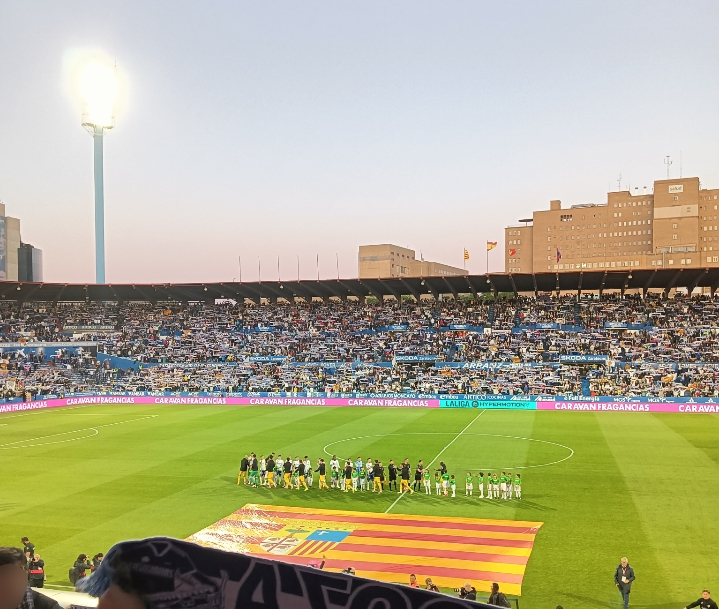
- Zaragoza and Huesca in the 2024–25 Segunda División match played in La Romareda, 27 April 2025
- Location: Aragon
- Teams: SD Huesca; Real Zaragoza
- First meeting: Zaragoza 1–1 Huesca; 1978–79 Copa del Rey (25 October 1978)
- Latest meeting: Zaragoza 2–0 Huesca; 2026–27 Primera Federación (7 November 2026)
- Next meeting: Huesca v Zaragoza; 2026–27 Primera Federación (28 March 2027)
- Stadiums: El Alcoraz (Huesca); Ibercaja Stadium (Zaragoza)

Statistics
- Total meetings: 25 matches
- Most wins: Zaragoza (10 wins)
- Most player appearances: Jair Amador (12); Jorge Pulido (12)
- Top scorer: Dongou (3)
- Largest victory: Zaragoza 3–0 Huesca; 1985–86 Copa del Rey (26 September 1985); Zaragoza 3–0 Huesca; 2022–23 Segunda División (10 December 2022)

The Aragonese derby (Spanish: Derbi aragonés), is the name given to any association football match contested between SD Huesca and Real Zaragoza, the two biggest clubs in Aragon.

== History ==
After the dissolution of UD Huesca, teams from both cities did not meet until 1978 in a Copa del Rey match, that ended with a draw at Estadio El Alcoraz. However, Real Zaragoza would eliminate Huesca in this and in their next meeting in the first round of the 1985–86 Copa del Rey.

In 2008, the relegation of Zaragoza from La Liga and the promotion of Huesca from Segunda División B allowed them to play the first Aragonese derby in Segunda División. It was played at La Romareda and ended with a 2–2 draw in a match where Zaragoza came back from a two-goal disadvantage. At El Alcoraz, Zaragoza beat the locals 1–0. Both teams would not face one another again until January 2016, again in Segunda División, in a match that ended 3–3 at La Romareda.

Huesca beat Zaragoza for the first time, on 6 November 2017, after eleven games played between them. At the end of that season, Huesca finished second and gained automatic promotion for the first time to La Liga, while Zaragoza placed just behind in third, but lost in the subsequent play-offs (to Numancia of Soria, another of their rival teams), meaning Huesca would play in the division above their regional rivals for the first time.

== Head-to-head statistics ==
| Competition | GP | SDH | D | RZ | HG | ZG |
|---|---|---|---|---|---|---|
| Segunda División | 20 | 5 | 8 | 7 | 22 | 24 |
| Primera Federación | 1 | 0 | 0 | 1 | 0 | 2 |
| Copa del Rey | 4 | 0 | 2 | 2 | 3 | 7 |
| Total in all games | 25 | 5 | 10 | 10 | 25 | 33 |

== All-time results ==
=== Segunda División ===
| # | Season | Date | R. | Home team | Score | Away team | Att. | Huesca scorers | Zaragoza scorers |
|---|---|---|---|---|---|---|---|---|---|
| 1 | 2008–09 | 6 December 2008 | 15 | Zaragoza | 2 – 2 | Huesca | 30,000 | Rubén Castro (56), Vegar (63) | Ewerthon (71, 85) |
| 2 | 2008–09 | 9 May 2009 | 36 | Huesca | 0 – 1 | Zaragoza | 6,000 | | Ander Herrera (54) |
| 3 | 2015–16 | 3 January 2016 | 19 | Zaragoza | 3 – 3 | Huesca | 19,351 | Fran Mérida (56), Héctor Figueroa (58), Carlos David (89) | Ángel (39), Ortuño (63), Diamanka (73) |
| 4 | 2015–16 | 26 May 2016 | 40 | Huesca | 1 – 1 | Zaragoza | 2,887 | Samu Saiz (61) | Dongou (26) |
| 5 | 2016–17 | 4 September 2016 | 3 | Zaragoza | 1 – 0 | Huesca | 21,343 | | Jorge Casado (89) |
| 6 | 2016–17 | 4 February 2017 | 24 | Huesca | 2 – 3 | Zaragoza | 4,205 | Borja Lázaro (53), Alexander González (90+3) | Dongou (59, 78), Ángel (73) |
| 7 | 2017–18 | 6 November 2017 | 13 | Huesca | 3 – 1 | Zaragoza | 4,805 | Melero (16), Cucho Hernández (63, 85) | Zapater (84) |
| 8 | 2017–18 | 7 April 2018 | 34 | Zaragoza | 1 – 0 | Huesca | 28,992 | | Javi Ros (58) |
| 9 | 2019–20 | 22 December 2019 | 21 | Huesca | 2 – 1 | Zaragoza | 7,202 | Okazaki (20), Josué Sá (69) | Soro (46) |
| 10 | 2019–20 | 29 June 2020 | 36 | Zaragoza | 0 – 1 | Huesca | – (Note: Match played behind closed doors due to the COVID-19 pandemic.) | Javi Galán (90) | |
| 11 | 2021–22 | 11 October 2021 | 9 | Zaragoza | 0 – 0 | Huesca | 25,307 | | |
| 12 | 2021–22 | 17 April 2022 | 36 | Huesca | 1 – 1 | Zaragoza | 8,143 | Seoane (31) | Iván Azón (38) |
| 13 | 2022–23 | 10 December 2022 | 20 | Zaragoza | 3 – 0 | Huesca | 20,511 | | Francho (3), Giuliano (14), Vada (90+3) |
| 14 | 2022–23 | 19 March 2023 | 32 | Huesca | 1 – 1 | Zaragoza | 8,443 | Obeng (45+3) | Bebé (32) |
| 15 | 2023–24 | 18 November 2023 | 16 | Zaragoza | 0 – 2 | Huesca | 28,667 | Obeng (15), Juanjo Nieto (71) | |
| 16 | 2023–24 | 20 April 2024 | 36 | Huesca | 1 – 2 | Zaragoza | 8,181 | Miguel Loureiro (19) | Liso (36), Maikel Mesa (45+5) |
| 17 | 2024–25 | 9 November 2024 | 14 | Huesca | 1 – 1 | Zaragoza | 6,895 | Gerard Valentín (24) | Iván Azón (64) |
| 18 | 2024–25 | 27 April 2025 | 37 | Zaragoza | 1 – 1 | Huesca | 21,703 | Kortajarena (58) | Arriaga (49) |
| 19 | 2025–26 | 16 November 2025 | 14 | Zaragoza | 1 – 0 | Huesca | 16,078 | | Aguirregabiria (12) |
| 20 | 2025–26 | 26 April 2026 | 37 | Huesca | 1 – 0 | Zaragoza | 8,150 | Óscar Sielva (65) | |

=== Primera Federación ===
| # | Season | Date | R. | Home team | Score | Away team | Att. | Huesca scorers | Zaragoza scorers |
|---|---|---|---|---|---|---|---|---|---|
| 1 | 2026–27 | 7 November 2026 | 11 | Zaragoza | 2 – 0 | Huesca | 18,125 | | Joaquín Delgado (23), Iker Vadillo (50) |

=== Copa del Rey ===
| # | Season | Date | R. | Home team | Score | Away team | Att. | Huesca scorers | Zaragoza scorers |
|---|---|---|---|---|---|---|---|---|---|
| 1 | 1978–79 | 25 October 1978 | R2 | Zaragoza | 1 – 1 | Huesca | | Arquillo (23) | Pérez Aguerri (50) |
| 2 | 1978–79 | 1 November 1978 | R2 | Huesca | 0 – 1 | Zaragoza | | | Antić (30) |
| 3 | 1985–86 | 11 September 1985 | R1 | Huesca | 2 – 2 | Zaragoza | | Peralta (22), Sánchez (82) | Herrera (30, 57) |
| 4 | 1985–86 | 26 September 1985 | R1 | Zaragoza | 3 – 0 | Huesca | | | Ruben Sosa (61), Casuco (72), Fraile (76) |

== See also ==
Real Zaragoza's other rivalries:

- CA Osasuna (an)
- CD Numancia (es)
