= 2019–20 SD Huesca season =

SD Huesca
2019–20 season
- President: Agustín Lasaosa
- Head coach: Míchel
- Stadium: Estadio El Alcoraz
- Segunda División: 1st (promoted)
- Copa del Rey: Second round
- Top goalscorer: League: Shinji Okazaki (12); All: Shinji Okazaki (12)
Home colours	Away colours	Third colours

The 2019–20 season was SD Huesca's 60th season in existence and the club's first season back in the second division of Spanish football. In addition to the domestic league, SD Huesca participated in this season's edition of the Copa del Rey. The season was slated to cover a period from 1 July 2019 to 30 June 2020. It was extended extraordinarily beyond 30 June due to the COVID-19 pandemic in Spain.

Following a 3–0 win over CD Numancia on 17 July 2020, Huesca won immediate promotion back to La Liga for the 2020–21 season as champions.

== Players ==
=== First-team squad ===
As of 1 February 2020.

Note: Flags indicate national team as defined under FIFA eligibility rules; some limited exceptions apply. Players may hold more than one non-FIFA nationality.

No.	Pos.	Nation	Player
1	GK	ESP	Álvaro Fernández
2	DF	ESP	Miguelón (on loan from Villarreal)
3	DF	POR	Josué Sá (on loan from Anderlecht)
4	DF	ESP	Pablo Insua (on loan from Schalke 04)
5	MF	ESP	Pedro Mosquera
6	MF	CIV	Cheick Doukouré (on loan from Levante)
7	MF	ESP	David Ferreiro
8	MF	ESP	Eugeni
9	FW	ESP	Jordi Mboula (on loan from Monaco)
10	FW	ESP	Cristo González (on loan from Udinese)
11	DF	ESP	Javi Galán
12	FW	JPN	Shinji Okazaki
13	GK	ESP	Rubén Yáñez (on loan from Getafe)

No.	Pos.	Nation	Player
14	DF	ESP	Jorge Pulido (captain)
15	DF	CRO	Toni Datković (on loan from Lokomotiva)
16	DF	POR	Luisinho
17	MF	ESP	Mikel Rico
18	MF	ESP	Sergio Gómez (on loan from Borussia Dortmund)
19	DF	ESP	Pedro López
21	MF	ESP	Juan Carlos
23	FW	ESP	Dani Raba (on loan from Villarreal)
24	FW	ESP	Rafa Mir (on loan from Wolverhampton Wanderers)
25	MF	NGR	Kelechi Nwakali
26	DF	ESP	Kike Hermoso
30	GK	ESP	Antonio Valera

=== Out on loan ===
Note: Flags indicate national team as defined under FIFA eligibility rules; some limited exceptions apply. Players may hold more than one non-FIFA nationality.

No.	Pos.	Nation	Player
—	GK	ESP	Ander Bardají (on loan at Ejea until 30 June 2020)
—	GK	SRB	Aleksandar Jovanović (on loan at Deportivo La Coruña until 30 June 2020)
—	MF	ARG	Damián Musto (on loan at Internacional until 30 June 2021)
—	MF	ESP	Joaquín Muñoz (on loan at Mirandés until 30 June 2020)

No.	Pos.	Nation	Player
—	MF	ESP	Jaime Seoane (on loan at Lugo until 30 June 2020)
—	FW	ESP	Dani Escriche (on loan at Elche until 30 June 2020)
—	FW	HON	Jonathan Toro (on loan at Tondela until 30 June 2020)

== Pre-season and friendlies ==
Win Draw Loss

20 July 2019 Friendly	Calahorra	0–0	Huesca	Calahorra, Spain
20:00 CEST (UTC+2)				Stadium: La Planilla

27 July 2019 Friendly	Huesca	2–0	Ejea	Benasque, Spain
18:00 CEST (UTC+2)				Stadium: Campo Municipal de Benasque

1 August 2019 Friendly	Levante	1–1	Huesca	Teruel, Spain
20:00 CEST (UTC+2)				Stadium: Estadio Pinilla

4 August 2019 Friendly	Huesca	2–2	Castellón	Teruel, Spain
20:00 CEST (UTC+2)				Stadium: Estadio Pinilla

8 August 2019 Friendly	Olot	0–0	Huesca	Olot, Spain
19:30 CEST (UTC+2)				Stadium: Municipal

10 August 2019 Friendly	Girona	0–2	Huesca	Girona, Spain
20:00 CEST (UTC+2)				Stadium: Estadi Montilivi

== Competitions ==
=== Overview ===
Competition	First match	Last match	Starting round	Final position	Record							
Competition	First match	Last match	Starting round	Final position	Pld	W	D	L	GF	GA	GD	Win %
Segunda División	18 August 2019	19 July 2020	Matchday 1	Winners	42	21	7	14	55	42	+13	50.00
Copa del Rey	19 December 2019	11 January 2020	First round	Second round	2	1	0	1	2	2	+0	50.00
Total					44	22	7	15	57	44	+13	50.00

Source: Soccerway

=== Segunda División ===
==== League table ====
Pos	Team	Pld	W	D	L	GF	GA	GD	Pts	Promotion, qualification or relegation
1	Huesca (C, P)	42	21	7	14	55	42	+13	70	Promotion to La Liga
2	Cádiz (P)	42	19	12	11	50	39	+11	69	Promotion to La Liga
3	Zaragoza	42	18	11	13	59	53	+6	65	Qualification to promotion play-offs
4	Almería	42	17	13	12	62	43	+19	64	Qualification to promotion play-offs
5	Girona	42	17	12	13	48	43	+5	63	Qualification to promotion play-offs

Source: LaLiga Soccerway
Rules for classification: 1) points; 2) head-to-head points; 3) head-to-head goal difference; 4) goal difference; 5) number of goals scored
(C) Champions; (P) Promoted

==== Results summary ====
Overall								Home						Away					
Pld	W	D	L	GF	GA	GD	Pts	W	D	L	GF	GA	GD	W	D	L	GF	GA	GD
42	21	7	14	55	42	+13	70	15	3	3	36	17	+19	6	4	11	19	25	−6

Source: La Liga SmartBank

==== Results by round ====
Round	1	2	3	4	5	6	7	8	9	10	11	12	13	14	15	16	17	18	19	20	21	22	23	24	25	26	27	28	29	30	31	32	33	34	35	36	37	38	39	40	41	42
Ground	A	H	A	H	A	H	A	H	A	H	H	A	H	A	H	A	H	A	H	A	H	A	H	A	H	A	A	H	A	H	H	A	H	A	H	A	H	A	H	A	H	A
Result	W	W	L	W	L	L	W	W	L	W	D	L	W	D	W	L	W	W	L	L	W	D	W	D	W	L	L	W	L	D	W	W	L	D	D	W	W	L	W	L	W	W
Position	8	3	6	5	5	7	5	5	5	4	5	6	4	4	2	4	3	3	3	5	3	4	4	4	4	4	4	4	4	4	4	4	4	4	4	3	2	2	2	2	2	1

Source: La Liga SmartBank
A = Away; H = Home; W = Win; D = Draw; L = Loss

==== Matches ====
The fixtures were revealed on 4 July 2019.

18 August 2019 1	Las Palmas	0–1	Huesca	Las Palmas
20:00 CEST (UTC+2)	Ruiz de Galarreta (yellow card) 51'; Mantovani (yellow card) 85'; Josep Martínez (yellow card) 90+4'	Report	Kike (yellow card) 11'; Gallar 76'; Miguelón (yellow card) 90'; Dani Escriche (yellow card) 90+4'	Stadium: Gran Canaria; Attendance: 10,427; Referee: Jorge Figueroa Vázquez

25 August 2019 2	Huesca	3–1	Deportivo La Coruña	Huesca
19:00 CEST (UTC+2)	Eugeni 26'; Raba 49'; Pulido 53'	Report	Santos 72'	Stadium: El Alcoraz; Attendance: 6,000; Referee: Isidro Díaz de Mera Escuderos

31 August 2019 3	Almería	1–0	Huesca	Almería
20:00 CEST (UTC+2)	Sekou 4'	Report		Stadium: Juegos Mediterráneos; Attendance: 9,542; Referee: Dámaso Arcediano Monescillo

8 September 2019 4	Huesca	1–0	Sporting Gijón	Huesca
12:00 CEST (UTC+2)	Dani Raba (yellow card) 28' (goal) 49'; Eugeni Valderrama (yellow card) 53'; Ivi (yellow card) 89'	Report	Pedro Díaz (yellow card) 35' (yellow-red card) 59'; Manu García (yellow card) 57'	Stadium: El Alcoraz; Attendance: 6,438; Referee: José López Toca

14 September 2019 5	Numancia	1–0	Huesca	Soria
16:00 CEST (UTC+2)	Nacho (yellow card) 58'; Álex Sola (yellow card) 62'; Alberto Escassi 80'	Report	David Ferreiro (yellow card) 45+2'; Luisinho (yellow card) 48'; Jorge Pulido (yellow card) 55'	Stadium: Los Pajaritos; Attendance: 4,032; Referee: Daniel Trujillo Suárez

18 September 2019 6	Huesca	0–1	Albacete	Huesca
19:00 CEST (UTC+2)	Galán (yellow card) 63'	Report	Néstor Susaeta 4' (pen.) (yellow card) 90+3'; Alberto Benito (yellow card) 13'; Zozulya (yellow card) 25'; Pedro (yellow card) 31'; Israfilov (yellow card) 32'; Acuña (yellow card) 61'; Barri (yellow card) 80'	Stadium: El Alcoraz; Attendance: 6,414; Referee: Rubén Ávalos Barrera

22 September 2019 7	Extremadura	0–1	Huesca	Almendralejo
20:00 CEST (UTC+2)	Zarfino (yellow card) 78'	Report	Jorge Pulido (yellow card) 14'; Juan Carlos 22'; Mosquera (yellow card) 28'; Luisinho (yellow card) 73'; Josué Sá (yellow card) 85'	Stadium: Ciudad de Almendralejo; Attendance: 6,278; Referee: Juan Pulido Santana

28 September 2019 8	Huesca	1–0	Girona	Huesca
18:00 CEST (UTC+2)	Okazaki 43'; Mosquera (yellow card) 76'; Galán (yellow card) 90+3'	Report	Diamanka (yellow card) 47'; Gumbau (yellow card) 58'; Granell (yellow card) 72'; Stuani (yellow card) 90+1'; Sáiz (yellow card) 90+6'	Stadium: El Alcoraz; Attendance: 6,624; Referee: Oliver De la Fuente Ramos

2 October 2019 9	Cádiz	1–0	Huesca	Cádiz
19:00 CEST (UTC+2)	Lozano 55'	Report		Stadium: Ramón de Carranza; Attendance: 15,099; Referee: Javier Iglesias Villanueva

6 October 2019 10	Huesca	2–0	Málaga	Huesca
20:00 CEST (UTC+2)	Jorge Pulido 14'; Juan Carlos 40'; Cristo González (yellow card) 88'; Mosquera (yellow card) 89'	Report	Luis Hernández (yellow card) 50'; Adrián (red card) 55'; Sadiku (yellow card) 71'; Diego González (yellow card) 88'	Stadium: El Alcoraz; Attendance: 6,383; Referee: Miguel Ortíz Arias

13 October 2019 11	Huesca	1–1	Racing Santander	Huesca
18:00 CEST (UTC+2)	Ivi 90+5'	Report	Cejudo 68'; Olaortua (yellow card) 90'	Stadium: El Alcoraz; Attendance: 6,659; Referee: Álvaro Moreno Aragón

19 October 2019 12	Lugo	3–2	Huesca	Lugo
18:00 CEST (UTC+2)	Rahmani (yellow card) 6' (yellow-red card) 47'; José Carlos 9' (yellow card) 90+4'; Carlos Pita (yellow card) 24'; Cristian 37' (pen.); Peybernes 70'	Report	Josué Sá (yellow card) 17' (yellow-red card) 69'; Álvaro Fernández (yellow card) 37'; Okazaki 54'; Miguelón 64' (yellow card) 72'; Luisinho (yellow card) 87'	Stadium: Anxo Carro; Attendance: 2,583; Referee: Aitor Gorostegui Fernández

27 October 2019 13	Huesca	2–0	Elche	Huesca
18:00 CET (UTC+1)	Miguelón (yellow card) 30'; Galán (yellow card) 37'; Okazaki 45'; Juan Carlos 59'; Dani Raba (yellow card) 73'	Report	Pere Milla (yellow card) 42'; Manuel Sánchez (yellow card) 44'; Gonzalo Villar (yellow card) 68'; Qasmi (yellow card) 90+1'	Stadium: El Alcoraz; Attendance: 6,525; Referee: Juan Pulido Santana

2 November 2019 14	Tenerife	0–0	Huesca	Santa Cruz de Tenerife
20:00 CET (UTC+1)	Mazáň (yellow card) 35' (yellow-red card) 79'; Malbašić (yellow card) 58'; Ortolá (yellow card) 90+2'	Report	Jorge Pulido (yellow card) 90'; Eugeni Valderrama (yellow card) 90+3'	Stadium: Heliodoro Rodríguez López; Attendance: 9,686; Referee: Oliver De la Fuente Ramos

9 November 2019 15	Huesca	3–1	Oviedo	Huesca
16:00 CET (UTC+1)	Dani Raba 15'; Mikel Rico 20' 87'; Galán (yellow card) 52'; Datković (yellow card) 90+5'	Report	Carlos Hernández (yellow card) 5'; Christian Fernández 32'; Champagne (yellow card) 77'; Alejandro Arribas (yellow card) 82'	Stadium: El Alcoraz; Attendance: 6,223; Referee: Luis Milla Alvendiz

16 November 2019 16	Fuenlabrada	3–2	Huesca	Fuenlabrada
13:00 CET (UTC+1)	Antonio Cristian 12'; David Prieto (yellow card) 42'; Josué Sá 53' (o.g.); José Fran 75' (yellow card) 85'; Cristóbal (yellow card) 90+4'	Report	Datković (yellow card) 37'; Cristo González 55' 78'; Josué Sá (yellow card) 80'	Stadium: Fernando Torres; Attendance: 4,832; Referee: José López Toca

23 November 2019 17	Huesca	2–0	Ponferradina	Huesca
20:00 CET (UTC+1)		Report		Stadium: El Alcoraz

30 November 2019 18	Alcorcón	0–2	Huesca	Alcorcón
16:00 CET (UTC+1)		Report		Stadium: Santo Domingo

7 December 2019 19	Huesca	0–2	Rayo Vallecano	Huesca
20:00 CET (UTC+1)		Report		Stadium: El Alcoraz

14 December 2019 20	Mirandés	2–0	Huesca	Miranda de Ebro
16:00 CET (UTC+1)		Report		Stadium: Anduva

22 December 2019 21	Huesca	2–1	Zaragoza	Huesca
16:00 CET (UTC+1)	Okazaki 20'; Pulido (yellow card) 27'; Ferreiro (yellow card) 45'; Luisinho (yellow card) 47'; Josué Sá 69'	Report	Soro 46'; Igbekeme (yellow card) 59'; Suárez (yellow card) 61'; Guitián (yellow card) 67' (red card) 82'; Delmás (red card) 76'; Guti (yellow card) 89'	Stadium: El Alcoraz; Attendance: 7,202; Referee: Isidro Díaz de Mera Escuderos

4 January 2020 22	Elche	1–1	Huesca	Elche
20:00 CET (UTC+1)		Report		Stadium: Martínez Valero

15 January 2020 23	Huesca	2–1	Tenerife	Huesca
19:00 CET (UTC+1)		Report		Stadium: El Alcoraz

19 January 2020 24	Oviedo	1–1	Huesca	Oviedo
18:15 CET (UTC+1)		Report		Stadium: Carlos Tartiere

25 January 2020 25	Huesca	2–1	Lugo	Huesca
16:00 CET (UTC+1)		Report		Stadium: El Alcoraz

1 February 2020 26	Ponferradina	3–1	Huesca	Ponferrada
18:15 CET (UTC+1)		Report		Stadium: El Toralín

8 February 2020 27	Girona	1–0	Huesca	Girona
16:00 CET (UTC+1)		Report		Stadium: Montilivi

15 February 2020 28	Huesca	3–2	Almería	Huesca
16:00 CET (UTC+1)		Report		Stadium: El Alcoraz

23 February 2020 29	Rayo Vallecano	2–0	Huesca	Madrid
21:00 CET (UTC+1)		Report		Stadium: Vallecas

29 February 2020 30	Huesca	2–2	Extremadura	Huesca
16:00 CET (UTC+1)		Report		Stadium: El Alcoraz

7 March 2020 31	Huesca	2–0	Fuenlabrada	Huesca
18:15 CET (UTC+1)		Report		Stadium: El Alcoraz

12 June 2020 32	Málaga	1–3	Huesca	Málaga
19:30 CEST (UTC+2)		Report		Stadium: La Rosaleda; Attendance: 0

18 June 2020 33	Huesca	1–2	Mirandés	Huesca
19:30 CEST (UTC+2)		Report		Stadium: El Alcoraz; Attendance: 0

21 June 2020 34	Albacete	2–2	Huesca	Albacete
19:30 CEST (UTC+2)		Report		Stadium: Carlos Belmonte; Attendance: 0

24 June 2020 35	Huesca	1–1	Cádiz	Huesca
19:30 CEST (UTC+2)	Okazaki 65'	Report	Álex 90+7' (pen.)	Stadium: El Alcoraz; Attendance: 0 Referee: Daniel Jesús Trujillo Suárez

29 June 2020 36	Zaragoza	0–1	Huesca	Zaragoza
21:45 CEST (UTC+2)	Guti (yellow card) 21'; Torres (yellow card) 65'; Linares (yellow card) 90+6'; Eguaras (yellow card) 90+6'; El Yamiq (yellow card) 90+7'	Report	Rico (yellow card) 5'; Juan Carlos (yellow card) 40'; Pulido (yellow card) 81'; Galán 90+5'	Stadium: La Romareda; Attendance: 0 Referee: Isidro Díaz de Mera Escuderos

2 July 2020 37	Huesca	1–0	Las Palmas	Huesca
19:30 CEST (UTC+2)	Okazaki 45+1'; Galán (yellow card) 80'	Report	Cristian (yellow card) 35'; Mantovani (yellow card) 37' (yellow-red card) 87'	Stadium: El Alcoraz; Attendance: 0 Referee: Jon Ander González Esteban

5 July 2020 38	Deportivo La Coruña	2–1	Huesca	A Coruña
17:00 CEST (UTC+2)	Aketxe 19'; Santos 43'; Shibasaki (yellow card) 47'; Bóveda (yellow card) 84'	Report	Mir 8'; Pulido (yellow card) 29'; Luisinho (yellow card) 45+2'	Stadium: Abanca-Riazor; Attendance: 0 Referee: Saúl Ais Reig

8 July 2020 39	Huesca	2–1	Alcorcón	Huesca
21:45 CEST (UTC+2)	González 21'; Galán (yellow card) 41'; Okazaki 45+3'; Luisinho (yellow card) 90+2'	Report	Sá 30' (o.g.); Ernesto (yellow card) 63'; Perea (yellow card) 82'	Stadium: El Alcoraz; Attendance: 0 Referee: Dámaso Arcediano Monescillo

11 July 2020 40	Racing Santander	1–0	Huesca	Santander
17:00 CEST (UTC+2)	Guillermo 26'; Moi (yellow card) 90+1'	Report	Mboula (yellow card) 66'	Stadium: El Sardinero; Attendance: 0 Referee: Javier Iglesias Villanueva

17 July 2020 41	Huesca	3–0	Numancia	Huesca
22:00 CEST (UTC+2)	Mir 54' (pen.), 68'; Sá (yellow card) 62'; Okazaki 78'	Report	Hernández (yellow card) 53'	Stadium: El Alcoraz; Attendance: 0 Referee: José Antonio López Toca

20 July 2020 42	Sporting Gijón	0–1	Huesca	Gijón
22:00 CEST (UTC+2)		Report	González 73'	Stadium: El Molinón; Attendance: 0 Referee: Gorka Sagués Oscoz

=== Copa del Rey ===
19 December 2019 First round	Laredo	0–1	Huesca	Laredo
20:30 CET (UTC+1)		Report	Cristo 82'	Stadium: San Lorenzo; Attendance: 2,300; Referee: Aitor Gorostegui Fernández-Ortega

11 January 2020 Second round	Cultural Leonesa	2–1	Huesca	León
19:00 CET (UTC+1)	Benito 76'; Kawaya 90' (pen.)	Report	Raba 7'	Stadium: Reino de León; Attendance: 4,820; Referee: Gorka Sagués Oscoz

== Statistics ==
=== Appearances and goals ===
Last updated on 20 July 2020.

No.	Pos	Nat	Player	Total		Segunda División		Copa del Rey	
No.	Pos	Nat	Player	Apps	Goals	Apps	Goals	Apps	Goals
Goalkeepers
1	GK	(Spain) ESP	Álvaro Fernández	36	0	36	0	0	0
13	GK	(Spain) ESP	Rubén Yáñez	8	0	6	0	2	0
30	GK	(Spain) ESP	Antonio Valera	0	0	0	0	0	0
Defenders
2	DF	(Spain) ESP	Miguelón	28	2	25+1	2	1+1	0
3	DF	(Portugal) POR	Josué Sá	27	1	25+1	1	0+1	0
4	DF	(Spain) ESP	Pablo Insua	9	0	6+1	0	2	0
11	DF	(Spain) ESP	Javi Galán	30	1	19+9	1	2	0
14	DF	(Spain) ESP	Jorge Pulido	39	2	39	2	0	0
15	DF	(Croatia) CRO	Toni Datković	19	0	11+6	0	2	0
16	DF	(Portugal) POR	Luisinho	27	0	24+3	0	0	0
19	DF	(Spain) ESP	Pedro López	19	0	17+1	0	1	0
26	DF	(Spain) ESP	Kike Hermoso	3	0	3	0	0	0
Midfielders
5	MF	(Spain) ESP	Pedro Mosquera	40	0	37+2	0	1	0
6	MF	(Ivory Coast) CIV	Cheick Doukouré	4	0	2+2	0	0	0
7	MF	(Spain) ESP	David Ferreiro	37	1	30+7	1	0	0
8	MF	(Spain) ESP	Eugeni	37	3	19+16	3	1+1	0
17	MF	(Spain) ESP	Mikel Rico	42	7	40+2	7	0	0
18	MF	(Spain) ESP	Sergio Gómez	37	1	19+17	1	1	0
21	MF	(Spain) ESP	Juan Carlos	33	4	24+9	4	0	0
25	MF	(Nigeria) NGR	Kelechi Nwakali	5	0	1+4	0	0	0
Forwards
9	FW	(Spain) ESP	Jordi Mboula	17	0	7+8	0	2	0
10	FW	(Spain) ESP	Cristo González	27	6	13+13	5	0+1	1
12	FW	(Japan) JPN	Shinji Okazaki	38	12	26+11	12	0+1	0
23	FW	(Spain) ESP	Dani Raba	24	5	20+3	4	1	1
24	FW	(Spain) ESP	Rafa Mir	18	9	10+8	9	0	0
Players who have made an appearance or had a squad number this season but have left the club
20	MF	(Spain) ESP	Jaime Seoane	2	0	0	0	2	0
22	MF	(Spain) ESP	Joaquín Muñoz	3	0	0+1	0	1+1	0
24	MF	(Spain) ESP	Ivi	9	1	1+6	1	2	0
