= Hugo Anglada =

Spanish footballer

Personal information
- Full name: Hugo Anglada Gutiérrez
- Date of birth: 17 March 2004 (age 22)
- Place of birth: Almudévar, Spain
- Height: 1.82 m (6 ft 0 in)
- Position: Centre back

Team information
- Current team: Atlético Baleares
- Number: 16

Youth career
- Amistad
- Zaragoza
- Huesca

Senior career*
Years	Team	Apps	(Gls)
2021–2024	Huesca B	45	(0)
2022–2025	Huesca	4	(0)
2023–2024	→ Talavera (loan)	10	(0)
2025–2026	Girona B	10	(0)
2025–2026	→ Barbastro (loan)	14	(1)
2026–	Atlético Baleares	3	(0)

International career^{‡}
2022	Spain U19	2	(0)
- * Club domestic league appearances and goals as of 14 May 2026 ‡ National team caps and goals as of 1 September 2022

Hugo Anglada Gutiérrez (born 17 March 2004) is a Spanish footballer who plays as a central defender for Segunda Federación club Atlético Baleares.

== Club career ==
Born in Almudévar, Huesca, Aragon, Anglada represented UD Amistad, Real Zaragoza and SD Huesca as a youth. He made his senior debut with the latter's reserves on 23 May 2021, starting in a 3–2 home win over CD Binéfar, for the Tercera División play-offs.

On 7 July 2021, Anglada renewed his contract until 2025. He made his first team debut on 12 August of the following year, starting in a 0–0 Segunda División away draw against Levante UD.

On 4 August 2023, Anglada was loaned to Segunda Federación side CF Talavera de la Reina for the season. Upon returning, he only featured in two matches for the main squad before moving to Girona FC's B-team in Tercera Federación on 3 February 2025.

== Career statistics ==
As of match played 30 March 2025

Appearances and goals by club, season and competition
Club	Season	League			Cup		Continental		Other		Total	
Club	Season	Division	Apps	Goals	Apps	Goals	Apps	Goals	Apps	Goals	Apps	Goals
Huesca B	2020–21	Segunda División B	0	0	—		—		2 (Note: Appearances in Segunda División B play-offs)	0	2	0
Huesca B	2021–22	Segunda Federación	22	0	—		—		—		22	0
Huesca B	2022–23	Tercera Federación	23	0	—		—		2 (Note: Appearances in Promotion play-offs)	1	25	1
Huesca B	Total		45	0	—		—		4	1	49	1
Huesca	2022–23	Segunda División	3	0	1	0	—		—		4	0
Huesca	2024–25	Segunda División	1	0	1	0	—		—		2	0
Huesca	Total		4	0	2	0	—		—		6	0
Talavera (loan)	2023–24	Segunda Federación	10	0	1	0	—		—		11	0
Girona B	2024–25	Tercera Federación	8	0	—		—		—		8	0
Girona	2024–25	La Liga	0	0	0	0	—		1 (Note: Appearances in Copa Catalunya)	0	1	0
Career total			66	0	3	0	0	0	5	1	75	1
