= Adrián Pereda =

Spanish footballer

Personal information
- Full name: Adrián Pereda Franco
- Date of birth: 14 May 2003 (age 23)
- Place of birth: Santander, Spain
- Height: 1.94 m (6 ft 4 in)
- Position: Goalkeeper

Team information
- Current team: Zamora
- Number: 13

Youth career
- Racing Santander
- 2018–2021: Deportivo La Coruña
- 2021–2022: Villarreal

Senior career*
Years	Team	Apps	(Gls)
2022–2023	Villarreal C	6	(0)
2023–2024	Málaga B	15	(0)
2024–2025	Huesca B	16	(0)
2025	Huesca	3	(0)
2025–	Zamora	1	(0)
- * Club domestic league appearances and goals as of 25 May 2026

Adrián Pereda Franco (born 14 May 2003) is a Spanish footballer who plays as a goalkeeper for Zamora CF.

== Career ==
Born in Santander, Cantabria, Pereda played for the youth sides of Racing de Santander and Deportivo de La Coruña before joining Villarreal CF in 2021. After finishing his formation, he made his senior debut with the latter's C-team on 11 December 2022, starting in a 2–1 Tercera Federación home loss to Silla CF.

On 21 July 2023, Pereda terminated his link with the Yellow submarine and moved to Málaga CF, being initially assigned to the reserves also in the fifth division. A backup option, he joined another reserve team, SD Huesca B, on 7 July 2024.

Pereda made his first team debut on 30 October 2024, coming on as a late substitute for Juan Pérez in a 2–0 away win over CF Badalona Futur, for the season's Copa del Rey. His professional debut occurred the following 19 April, as he replaced injured Dani Jiménez in a 3–1 Segunda División home loss to former side Racing Santander.

On 28 June 2025, Pereda agreed to a deal with Primera Federación side Zamora CF.
