= Chatiliez =

Chatiliez is a surname. Notable people with the surname include:

- Étienne Chatiliez (born 1952), French film director
- Willy Chatiliez (born 2005), Chilean footballer
