= Axel Bejarano =

Spanish footballer

Personal information
- Full name: Axel Bejarano Fernández
- Date of birth: 28 May 2005 (age 21)
- Place of birth: Palma, Spain
- Position: Winger

Team information
- Current team: Atlético Baleares
- Number: 20

Youth career
- Mallorca
- 2022–2023: San Francisco
- 2023–2024: Mallorca

Senior career*
Years	Team	Apps	(Gls)
2024–2025	Huesca B	28	(5)
2024–2025	Huesca	3	(0)
2025–	Atlético Baleares	24	(0)
- * Club domestic league appearances and goals as of 14 May 2026

Axel Bejarano Fernández (born 28 May 2005) is a Spanish footballer who plays for CD Atlético Baleares. Mainly a winger, he can also play as an attacking midfielder.

== Career ==
Born in Palma de Mallorca, Balearic Islands, Bejarano was a RCD Mallorca youth graduate, being the top scorer of the Juvenil side of affiliate team CD San Francisco in the 2022–23 season. He subsequently returned to the Bermellones, before moving to SD Huesca on 5 September 2024 and being assigned to the reserves in Tercera Federación.

Bejarano made his senior debut on 8 September 2024, starting in a 1–0 away win over AD Almudévar. He made his first team debut on 13 October, coming on as a late substitute for Hugo Vallejo and providing the assist for Sergi Enrich's equalizer in a 2–2 Segunda División home draw against Albacete Balompié.

Bejarano scored his first senior goal on 30 October 2024, netting Huesca's second in a 2–0 away win over CF Badalona, for the season's Copa del Rey. The following 3 July, he signed a two-year deal with CD Atlético Baleares in Segunda Federación.
