= Ayman Arguigue =

Moroccan footballer

Personal information
- Full name: Ayman Arguigue Safsafi
- Date of birth: 11 May 2005 (age 21)
- Place of birth: Carcaixent, Spain
- Height: 1.82 m (6 ft 0 in)
- Position: Forward

Team information
- Current team: Villarreal B
- Number: 24

Youth career
- 2012–2022: Carcaixent
- 2022–2023: Huesca

Senior career*
Years	Team	Apps	(Gls)
2022–2025	Huesca B	23	(12)
2024–2026	Huesca	9	(0)
2025–2026	→ Teruel (loan)	16	(2)
2026	→ Villarreal B (loan)	16	(5)
2026–	Villarreal B	0	(0)

International career^{‡}
2024–	Morocco U20	10	(4)
- * Club domestic league appearances and goals as of 17 May 2026 ‡ National team caps and goals as of 5 January 2026

Ayman Arguigue Safsafi (Arabic: أيمن الركيك صفصافي; born 11 May 2005) is a footballer who plays as a forward for Spanish club Villarreal CF B. Born in Spain, he is a youth international for Morocco.

== Club career ==
Born in Carcaixent, Valencian Community to Moroccan parents, Arguigue began his career with hometown side UD Carcaixent at the age of seven. In August 2021, he went on a trial at Getafe CF, but signed a two-year contract with SD Huesca in June 2022, after being recommended by David Timor.

Arguigue made his senior debut with the B-team on 25 September 2022, coming on as a second-half substitute in a 4–3 Tercera Federación away win over CD La Almunia. He scored his first senior goal the following 5 March, netting the B's opener in a 3–0 home win over CD Cariñena.

Arguigue made his first team debut on 21 January 2024, replacing Óscar Sielva in a 3–2 Segunda División home loss to SD Huesca. On 12 July, he renewed his contract with the club until 2026.

On 25 August 2025, Arguigue was loaned to Primera Federación side CD Teruel for one year. The following 13 January, he moved to fellow league team Villarreal CF B also in a temporary deal, with a buyout clause.

On 17 June 2026, Arguigue signed a permanent three-year contract with the Yellow Submarine.

== International career ==
Eligible to play for Spain and Morocco, Arguigue was called up to the latter's under-20 squad in March 2023. He scored a brace on his debut for the Morocco U20s in a friendly 4–0 win over the Mauritania U20s on 24 January 2024.
