= Javi Hernández (footballer, born 2004) =

Spanish footballer (born 2004)

Personal information
- Full name: Francisco Javier Hernández Coarasa
- Date of birth: 30 January 2004 (age 22)
- Place of birth: Barcelona, Spain
- Height: 1.82 m (6 ft 0 in)
- Position: Attacking midfielder

Team information
- Current team: Espanyol
- Number: 28

Youth career
- Damm
- 2018–2022: Espanyol

Senior career*
Years	Team	Apps	(Gls)
2022–2025	Espanyol B	48	(14)
2024–2025	→ Huesca (loan)	26	(1)
2025–	Espanyol	1	(0)
2026	→ Mirandés (loan)	21	(7)
- * Club domestic league appearances and goals as of 16 August 2026

Francisco Javier "Javi" Hernández Coarasa (born 30 January 2004) is a Spanish professional footballer who plays as an attacking midfielder for RCD Espanyol.

== Career ==
Born in Barcelona, Catalonia, Hernández joined RCD Espanyol's youth sides in 2018, from CF Damm. He made his senior debut with the reserves on 11 September 2022, coming on as a late substitute for goalscorer Juan Camilo Becerra in a 2–1 Segunda Federación away win over Deportivo Aragón.

Hernández scored his first senior goal on 16 April 2023, netting the B's winner in a 1–0 home success over SCR Peña Deportiva. On 8 June, he renewed his contract until 2026, and was the top scorer of the B-team during the 2023–24 campaign with 12 goals.

On 13 August 2024, Hernández further extended his link with the Pericos until 2028, and was immediately loaned to Segunda División side SD Huesca for one year. He made his professional debut on 28 September, replacing Iker Kortajarena in a 1–0 away loss to CD Mirandés.

Hernández scored his first professional goal on 1 June 2025, netting his side's third in a 3–2 home win over CD Eldense. Back to the Pericos in July, he made his first team debut on 30 October, starting in a 2–1 away win over CE Atlètic Lleida, for the season's Copa del Rey.

On 8 January 2026, after just one further cup match, Hernández was loaned to Mirandés until June. Back to the Pericos in July, he made his La Liga debut on 16 August, starting in a 3–0 home win over Levante UD.

== Honours ==
Individual

- La Liga U23 Player of the Month: August 2026
