= Öztürk Karataş =

Turkish footballer

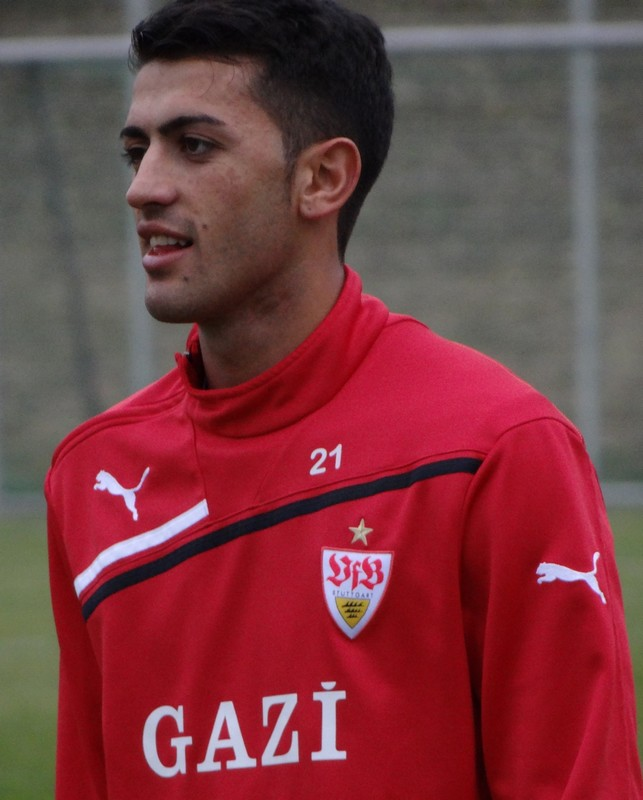
- Karataş training with VfB Stuttgart II

Personal information
- Date of birth: 15 February 1991 (age 35)
- Place of birth: Kağızman, Turkey
- Height: 1.78 m (5 ft 10 in)
- Position: Attacking midfielder

Youth career
- SSV Ulm
- –2009: Karlsruher SC
- 2009–2010: VfB Stuttgart

Senior career*
| Years | Team | Apps | (Gls) |
| 2010–2013 | VfB Stuttgart II | 35 | (1) |
| 2013–2014 | TSV Grunbach | | |
- * Club domestic league appearances and goals

Öztürk Karataş (born 15 February 1991) is a Turkish footballer who plays as an attacking midfielder.

== Club career ==
Karataş was born in Kağızman. On 8 May 2010, he had his debut for VfB Stuttgart II in the 3. Liga against Carl Zeiss Jena.

== International career ==
He played for Turkey at the 2008 European Under-17 Championship.
