= David García (footballer, born 2003) =

Spanish footballer

Personal information
- Full name: David García Hidalgo
- Date of birth: 15 September 2003 (age 23)
- Place of birth: Seville, Spain
- Height: 1.83 m (6 ft 0 in)
- Position: Midfielder

Team information
- Current team: Atlético Madrid B

Youth career
- 2019–2021: Tomares

Senior career*
Years	Team	Apps	(Gls)
2021–2022	Gerena	0	(0)
2022	Extremadura B	4	(1)
2022	Extremadura	7	(0)
2022–2024	Huesca B	52	(2)
2024–2025	Xerez	16	(0)
2025	Sanluqueño	14	(0)
2025–2026	Cádiz	0	(0)
2025–2026	→ Ibiza (loan)	26	(1)
2026–	Atlético Madrid B	0	(0)
- * Club domestic league appearances and goals as of 10 June 2026

David García Hidalgo (born 15 September 2003) is a Spanish professional footballer who plays as a midfielder for Atlético Madrileño.

== Career ==
Born in Seville, Andalusia, García was a youth product of UD Tomares. In July 2021, aged 17, he moved to Tercera División RFEF side CD Gerena, but did not feature for the squad and signed for Extremadura UD the following January.

Initially a member of the reserves also in the fifth division, García started to feature with the main squad in Primera División RFEF shortly after, as the club's financial problems worsened and most of the first team players left the club. On 16 March 2022, after seven first team matches, he moved to SD Huesca B in Segunda División RFEF.

On 12 July 2024, García agreed to a deal with Xerez CD also in the fourth division. He quickly established himself as a first-choice, but left to join Primera Federación side Atlético Sanluqueño CF the following 14 January.

On 28 June 2025, García signed a three-year contract with Cádiz CF in Segunda División, after the club activated a first option to buy clause on his Sanluqueño deal. On 1 September, however, he was loaned to third division side UD Ibiza for one year.

On 21 August 2026, García agreed to a one-year deal with Atlético Madrid, being assigned to the reserves also in the third tier.
