= 2008 UEFA European Under-17 Championship =

UEFA Euro Under-17 Football Championship
2008 Avrupa 17 Yaş Altı Futbol Şampiyonası

Tournament details
- Host country: Turkey
- Dates: 4–16 May
- Teams: 8 (from 1 confederation)
- Venues: 2 (in 1 host city)

Final positions
- Champions: Spain (8th title)
- Runners-up: France

Tournament statistics
- Matches played: 15
- Goals scored: 36 (2.4 per match)
- Attendance: 8,844 (590 per match)
- Top scorer: (France) Yannis Tafer (4 goals)
- Best player: (Serbia) Danijel Aleksić

The final tournament of the 2008 UEFA European Under-17 Championship was the 26th UEFA European Under-17 Championship, UEFA's premier football tournament for players under the age of 17. The tournament was held in Turkey from 4 to 16 May 2008. Players born after 1 January 1991 were eligible to participate in this competition.

== Qualification ==
Two rounds of qualifying were held in order to determine the seven teams to join the hosts, Turkey, at the final tournament. The qualifying round, held from 14 September to 28 October 2007, divided the 52 remaining UEFA nations into 13 groups of four. At the end of the qualifying round, the top two teams in each group and the two best third-placed teams qualified for the elite round. The elite round, held from 13 to 31 March 2008, divided the remaining 28 teams into seven groups of four. At the end of the round, the top team in each group advanced to the final tournament.

=== Qualified teams ===
Nation	Qualified as
Turkey	Host
Republic of Ireland	Group 1 winner
Switzerland	Group 2 winner
France	Group 3 winner
Serbia	Group 4 winner
Scotland	Group 5 winner
Spain	Group 6 winner
Netherlands	Group 7 winner

== Group stage ==
=== Group A ===
Team	Pld	W	D	L	GF	GA	GD	Pts
Turkey	3	2	1	0	4	0	+4	7
Netherlands	3	2	0	1	3	3	0	6
Serbia	3	1	1	1	2	1	+1	4
Scotland	3	0	0	3	0	5	−5	0

4 May 2008
15:00

Scotland	0–2	Serbia
	(Report)	Aleksić 40+1', 42'

World Wonder Football Centre, Antalya
Attendance: 160
Referee: Anders Hermansen (Denmark)
4 May 2008
18:00

Turkey	3–0	Netherlands
Karataş 11'; Albayrak 71'; Demir 80+1'	(Report)

Mardan Sports Complex, Antalya
Attendance: 1,000
Referee: Libor Kovarik (Czech Republic)

7 May 2008
16:00

Turkey	1–0	Scotland
Yollu 13'	(Report)

Mardan Sports Complex, Antalya
Attendance: 1,700
Referee: Tero Nieminen (Finland)
7 May 2008
18:00

Netherlands	1–0	Serbia
Castillion 33'	(Report)

World Wonder Football Centre, Antalya
Attendance: 434
Referee: Hubert Siejewicz (Poland)

10 May 2008
16:00

Serbia	0–0	Turkey
	(Report)

World Wonder Football Centre, Antalya
Attendance: 500
Referee: Gediminas Mažeika (Lithuania)
10 May 2008
16:00

Netherlands	2–0	Scotland
Castillion 34'; Van Rhijn 46'	(Report)

Mardan Sports Complex, Antalya
Attendance: 500
Referee: Angel Angelov (Bulgaria)

=== Group B ===
Team	Pld	W	D	L	GF	GA	GD	Pts
Spain	3	2	1	0	8	4	+4	7
France	3	2	1	0	7	4	+3	7
Switzerland	3	1	0	2	1	4	−3	3
Republic of Ireland	3	0	0	3	2	6	−4	0

4 May 2008
15:00

France	2–1	Republic of Ireland
Tafer 65'; Lacazette 80+3'	(Report)	Murphy 32'

Mardan Sports Complex, Antalya
Attendance: 500
Referee: Gediminas Mažeika (Lithuania)
4 May 2008
18:00

Spain	2–0	Switzerland
S. García 52', 61'	(Report)

World Wonder Football Centre, Antalya
Attendance: 153
Referee: Hubert Siejewicz (Poland)

7 May 2008
15:00

Republic of Ireland	0–1	Switzerland
	(Report)	Gunning 49' (o.g.)

World Wonder Football Centre, Antalya
Attendance: 327
Referee: Libor Kovarik (Czech Republic)
7 May 2008
19:00

France	3–3	Spain
Tafer 11'; Grenier 43'; Rémy 48'	(Report)	Thiago 31', 67'; Pulido 45'

Mardan Sports Complex, Antalya
Attendance: 300
Referee: Angel Angelov (Bulgaria)

10 May 2008
19:00

Switzerland	0–2	France
	(Report)	Tafer 33', 51'

World Wonder Football Centre, Antalya
Attendance: 120
Referee: Anders Hermansen (Denmark)
10 May 2008
19:00

Republic of Ireland	1–3	Spain
Hourihane 15'	(Report)	Rochina 47', 56'; Keko 73'

Mardan Sports Complex, Antalya
Attendance: 250
Referee: Tero Nieminen (Finland)

== Knockout stage ==
=== Semi-finals ===
13 May 2008
17:30

Turkey	1–1 (a.e.t.)	France
Kayalı 31'	(Report)	Kolodziejczak 69'
Penalties
Kayalı (penalty missed); Çolak (penalty scored); Çek (penalty scored); Karadeniz (penalty missed); Eren (penalty scored)	3–4	(penalty missed) Tafer; (penalty scored) Fofana; (penalty scored) Kakuta; (penalty scored) Kolodziejczak; (penalty scored) Lacazette

Mardan Sports Complex, Antalya
Attendance: 2,000
Referee: Gediminas Mažeika (Lithuania)

13 May 2008
20:00

Spain	2–1 (a.e.t.)	Netherlands
Pulido 46'; Martínez 92'	(Report)	Sneijder 34'

Antalya Atatürk Stadium, Antalya
Attendance: 300
Referee: Anders Hermansen (Denmark)

=== Final ===
16 May 2008
18:30

France	0–4	Spain
	(Report)	Keko 31'; S. García 46'; Thiago 63' (pen.); Gavilán 69'

Mardan Sports Complex, Antalya
Attendance: 600
Referee: Libor Kovařík (Czech Republic)

== Goalscorers ==
4 goals

- (France) Yannis Tafer

3 goals

- (Spain) Thiago
- (Spain) Sergio García

2 goals

- (Netherlands) Geoffrey Castillion
- (Serbia) Danijel Aleksić
- (Spain) Rubén Rochina
- (Spain) Keko
- (Spain) Jorge Pulido

1 goal

- (France) Clément Grenier
- (France) Timothée Kolodziejczak
- (France) Alexandre Lacazette
- (France) William Rémy
- (Netherlands) Ricardo van Rhijn
- (Republic of Ireland) Conor Hourihane
- (Republic of Ireland) Paul Murphy

== Awards ==
- Golden Player: (Serbia) Danijel Aleksić
- Best Goalkeeper: (Serbia) Vilson Caković
