= Toni Abad =

Spanish footballer

Personal information
- Full name: José Antonio Abad Martínez
- Date of birth: 3 November 1996 (age 30)
- Place of birth: Valencia, Spain
- Height: 1.74 m (5 ft 9 in)
- Position: Right-back

Team information
- Current team: Ceuta

Youth career
- Torre Levante

Senior career*
Years	Team	Apps	(Gls)
2015–2018	Torre Levante	87	(3)
2018–2020	Badajoz	43	(0)
2020–2021	Cultural Leonesa	16	(1)
2021–2022	Alcoyano	26	(1)
2022–2024	Eldense	71	(1)
2024–2026	Huesca	66	(0)
2026–	Ceuta	0	(0)
- * Club domestic league appearances and goals as of 9 June 2026

Antonio José "Toni" Abad Martínez (born 3 November 1996) is a Spanish professional footballer who plays as a right-back for AD Ceuta FC.

== Club career ==
Abad was born in Valencia, and was a youth product of hometown side CF Torre Levante. He made his first team debut on 15 April 2015, starting in a 1–0 Tercera División away loss against CF La Nucía.

Definitely promoted to the main squad for the 2015–16 season, Abad immediately became a regular starter, and scored his first senior goal on 5 March 2017, netting his team's fourth in a 4–2 home win over Ontinyent CF. On 5 July 2018, he joined Segunda División B side CD Badajoz.

On 3 November 2020, after spending four months unemployed, Abad signed for Cultural y Deportiva Leonesa also in the third division, and ended the campaign as a starter. On 5 July 2021, he moved to CD Alcoyano in Primera División RFEF.

On 5 July 2022, Abad agreed to a deal with CD Eldense also in division three. An immediate first-choice, he contributed with one goal in 41 appearances overall as the club achieved promotion to Segunda División after a 59-year absence.

Abad made his professional debut on 13 August 2023, starting in a 1–0 away win over FC Cartagena. The following 4 July, he signed a two-year contract with SD Huesca also in the second division.

On 1 September 2026, free agent Abad joined AD Ceuta FC still in division two.
