= Willy Chatiliez =

Chilean footballer

Personal information
- Full name: Willy Tomás Chatiliez
- Date of birth: 26 March 2005 (age 21)
- Place of birth: Santiago, Chile
- Height: 1.74 m (5 ft 9 in)
- Position: Winger

Team information
- Current team: Unionistas

Youth career
- Universidad de Chile
- Cornellà
- 2021–2023: Europa
- 2023–2024: Badalona

Senior career*
Years	Team	Apps	(Gls)
2022–2023	Europa B	7	(2)
2024	Badalona	14	(1)
2024–2025	Huesca B	14	(2)
2024–2026	Huesca	7	(1)
2026	→ Cartagena (loan)	12	(0)
2026–	Unionistas	0	(0)

International career^{‡}
- Chile U15
2025	Chile U20	10	(0)
- * Club domestic league appearances and goals as of 23 May 2026 ‡ National team caps and goals as of 9 October 2025

Willy Tomás Chatiliez (born 26 March 2005) is a Chilean footballer who plays as a winger for Spanish club Unionistas de Salamanca.

== Club career ==
Born in Santiago to a French father, Chatiliez was with Universidad de Chile before moving to Spain at the age of nine, and representing Cornellà and Europa as a youth. In 2023, after making his senior debut with the latter's reserves in the Primera Catalana, he moved to Badalona and returned to youth football.

On 5 September 2024, after playing for Badalona's first team in the Tercera Federación, Chatiliez moved to Huesca and was assigned to the reserves, also in the fifth division. He made his first team debut on 30 October, starting in a 2–0 away win over Badalona Futur, for the season's Copa del Rey.

Chatiliez made his Segunda División debut on 17 November 2024, coming on as a second-half substitute for Iker Kortajarena in a 1–0 away loss to Cartagena. He scored his first professional goal the following 23 March, netting his side's first in a 2–1 away loss to Eibar.

On 2 February 2026, Chatiliez was loaned to Primera Federación side Cartagena until June. On 19 August, he moved to fellow league team Unionistas de Salamanca.

== International career ==
Chatiliez represented the Chile national under-20 team in both the 2025 South American Championship and the 2025 FIFA World Cup.
