= Iker Unzueta =

Spanish footballer

Personal information
- Full name: Iker Unzueta Arregui
- Date of birth: 4 August 1998 (age 28)
- Place of birth: Abadiño, Spain
- Height: 1.81 m (5 ft 11 in)
- Position: Forward

Team information
- Current team: Mirandés

Youth career
- Abadiño

Senior career*
Years	Team	Apps	(Gls)
2017–2019	Durango B		
2018–2020	Durango	45	(5)
2020–2022	Amorebieta	51	(8)
2022–2023	Logroñés	37	(13)
2023–2024	Vizela	2	(0)
2024	→ Amorebieta (loan)	20	(5)
2024–2025	Huesca	26	(1)
2025–2026	Lugo	37	(11)
2026–	Mirandés	0	(0)
- * Club domestic league appearances and goals as of 9 June 2026

Iker Unzueta Arregui (born 4 August 1998) is a Spanish professional footballer who plays as a forward for CD Mirandés.

== Club career ==
Born in Abadiño, Biscay, Basque Country, Unzueta joined SCD Durango in 2017, from hometown side Abadiño KE. Initially assigned to the reserves in the regional leagues, he also appeared in four matches for the first team during the campaign, achieving promotion from Tercera División.

Unzueta was definitely promoted to the first team in July 2019, after Durango's relegation back to the fourth tier. Roughly one year later, he signed for Segunda División B side SD Amorebieta, featuring regularly as his side achieved a first-ever promotion to Segunda División at the end of the season.

Unzueta made his professional debut on 14 August 2021, starting in a 0–2 away loss against Girona FC. He scored his first professional goal on 3 November, netting his team's third in a 4–1 home routing of Real Valladolid.

In August 2022, Unzueta signed for Primera Federación club SD Logroñés. He scored a career-best 13 goals during the campaign, as his side finished ninth.

On 3 June 2023, Primeira Liga side FC Vizela announced the signing of Unzueta on a two-year contract. In January 2024, he returned to Amorebieta on loan until the end of the season.

On 28 August 2024, Unzueta agreed to a two-year deal with SD Huesca also in the second division. He was released by the club the following 12 August, and signed for third division side CD Lugo just hours later.

On 15 July 2026, Unzueta moved to CD Mirandés also in division three on a one-year contract.
