= Diego González (footballer, born 1999) =

Spanish footballer

Personal information
- Full name: Diego González Cabanes
- Date of birth: 7 May 1999 (age 27)
- Place of birth: Villarreal, Spain
- Height: 1.79 m (5 ft 10 in)
- Position: Centre-back

Team information
- Current team: Zaragoza

Youth career
- Villarreal
- 2017–2018: Betis

Senior career*
Years	Team	Apps	(Gls)
2016–2017	Almazora	25	(1)
2018–2019	Betis B	39	(3)
2019–2021	Llagostera	43	(1)
2021–2024	Andorra	45	(1)
2022–2023	→ Eldense (loan)	34	(1)
2024–2025	Huesca	23	(1)
2025–2026	Ceuta	35	(0)
2026–	Zaragoza	0	(0)
- * Club domestic league appearances and goals as of 9 June 2026

Diego González Cabanes (born 7 May 1999) is a Spanish professional footballer who plays as a centre-back for Real Zaragoza.

== Club career ==
Born in Villarreal, Castellón, Valencian Community, González represented hometown side Villarreal CF as a youth before moving to Tercera División side CD Almazora on 18 October 2016. He made his senior debut five days later, starting in a 1–1 away draw against Ontinyent CF.

In 2017, González signed for Real Betis and returned to youth football. On 29 July 2019, after playing for the reserves also in the fourth division, he joined Segunda División B side UE Llagostera.

On 22 July 2021, González agreed to a contract with Primera División RFEF side FC Andorra. He was mainly a backup option to Adrià Vilanova and Álex Pastor during the season, as the club achieved a first-ever promotion to Segunda División.

On 29 July 2022, González was loaned to CD Eldense in the third tier, for one year. A regular starter, he contributed with one goal in 41 appearances overall as the side returned to the second level after a 59-year absence.

Back to the Tricolors in July 2023, González made his professional debut on 13 August, coming on as a late substitute for Julen Lobete in a 1–0 away win over CD Leganés. On 5 July 2024, after suffering relegation, he signed a two-year deal with SD Huesca also in the second division.

On 8 August 2025, González joined AD Ceuta FC also in division two on a one-year contract. The following 21 July, he agreed to a two-year deal with Real Zaragoza, freshly relegated to division three.
