= Joaquín Muñoz (footballer, born 1999) =

Spanish footballer

Personal information
- Full name: Joaquín Muñoz Benavides
- Date of birth: 10 March 1999 (age 27)
- Place of birth: Málaga, Spain
- Height: 1.73 m (5 ft 8 in)
- Position: Winger

Team information
- Current team: Málaga
- Number: 11

Youth career
- 2005–2006: La Unidad
- 2006–2015: Puerto Malagueño
- 2015–2018: Atlético Madrid

Senior career*
Years	Team	Apps	(Gls)
2018–2019	Atlético Madrid B	30	(7)
2019	Atlético Madrid	1	(0)
2019–2025	Huesca	126	(13)
2020	→ Mirandés (loan)	15	(1)
2020–2021	→ Málaga (loan)	30	(2)
2025–	Málaga	38	(5)
- * Club domestic league appearances and goals as of 3 June 2026

Joaquín Muñoz Benavides (born 10 March 1999) is a Spanish footballer who plays as a left winger for Málaga CF.

== Career ==
Born in Málaga, Andalusia, Joaquín joined Atlético Madrid's youth categories in 2015, from CD Puerto Malagueño. He made his senior debut with the reserves on 30 March 2018, coming on as a late substitute in a 3–0 Segunda División B home win against Coruxo FC.

On 3 July 2018, Joaquín signed a new contract until 2021 and was definitely promoted to the B-side. He scored his first senior goal on 14 October, netting his team's second in a 3–0 home defeat of Celta de Vigo B.

Joaquín made his professional – and La Liga – debut on 19 January 2019, coming on as a late substitute for Thomas Lemar in a 3–0 away defeat of SD Huesca. On 4 July, he signed a four-year deal precisely with the latter club, now in Segunda División.

On 22 January 2020, after being rarely used, Joaquín was loaned to fellow second division side CD Mirandés for the remainder of the season. At the club he scored his first professional goal, netting the equalizer in a 2–2 away draw against Sporting de Gijón on 9 February.

On 5 October 2020, Joaquín joined second division side Málaga CF on loan for one year. Upon returning, he became a regular starter for Huesca, leaving the club on 20 June 2025.

On 1 July 2025, Joaquín returned to Málaga on a permanent two-year contract.

== Career statistics ==
As of 1 September 2022

Club	Season	League			Cup		Other		Total	
Club	Season	Division	Apps	Goals	Apps	Goals	Apps	Goals	Apps	Goals
Atlético Madrid B	2017–18	Segunda División B	1	0	—		—		1	0
Atlético Madrid B	2018–19	Segunda División B	29	7	—		2 (Note: appearances in 2019 Segunda División B play-offs)	0	31	7
Atlético Madrid B	Total		30	7	—		2	0	32	7
Atlético Madrid	2018–19	La Liga	1	0	0	0	—		1	0
Huesca	2019–20	Segunda División	1	0	2	0	—		3	0
Huesca	2020–21	La Liga	3	0	0	0	—		3	0
Huesca	2021–23	Segunda División	30	4	2	0	—		32	4
Huesca	2022–23	Segunda División	1	0	0	0	—		1	0
Huesca	Total		35	4	4	0	—		39	4
Mirandés (loan)	2019–20	Segunda División	15	1	0	0	—		15	1
Málaga (loan)	2020–21	Segunda División	30	2	1	0	—		31	2
Career Total			111	14	5	0	2	0	118	14
