= Miguel Loureiro =

Spanish footballer

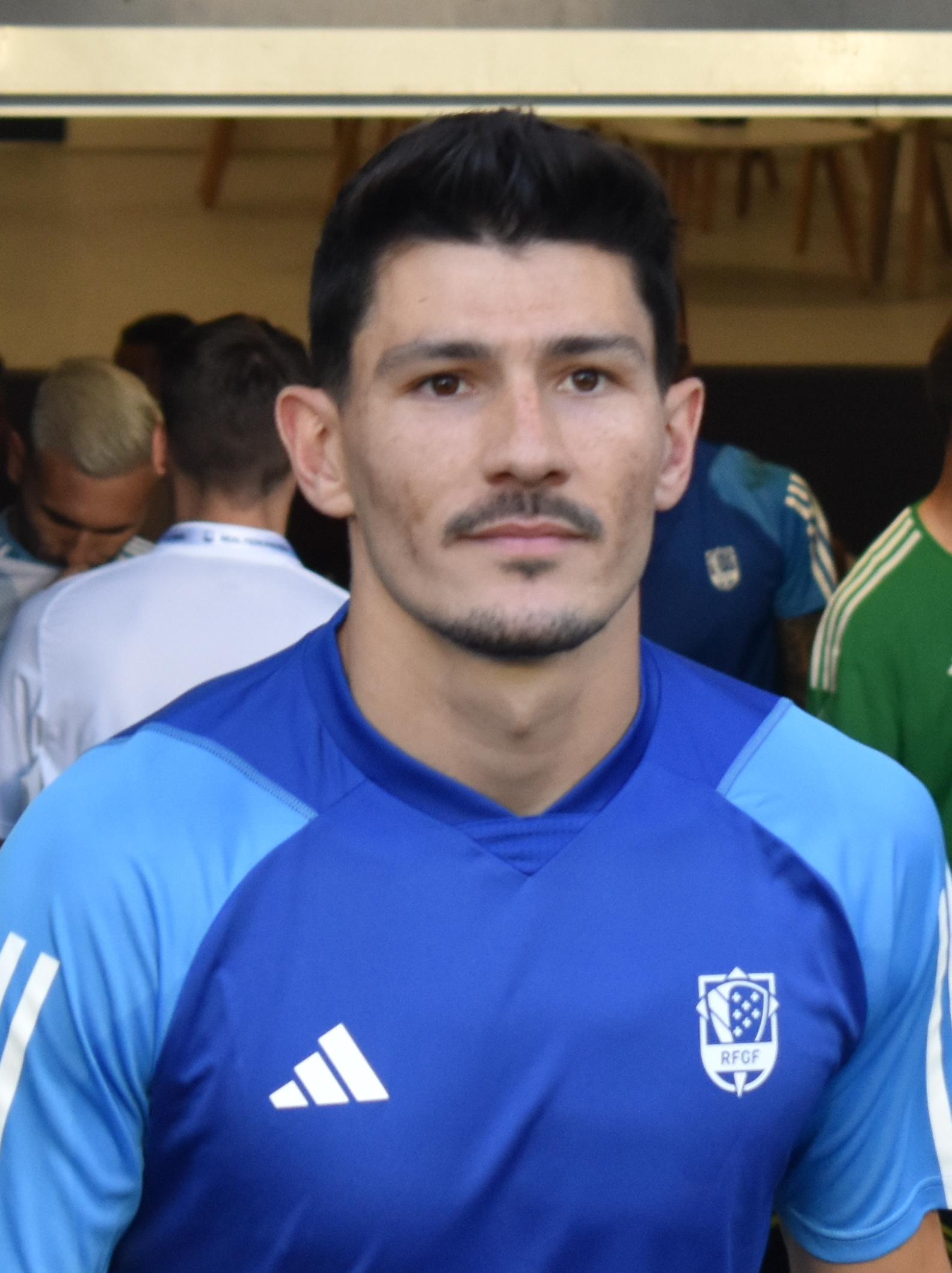
- Loureiro with Galicia in 2024

Personal information
- Full name: Miguel Loureiro Ameijenda
- Date of birth: 21 November 1996 (age 29)
- Place of birth: Cerceda, Spain
- Height: 1.75 m (5 ft 9 in)
- Position: Right-back

Team information
- Current team: Deportivo A Coruña
- Number: 15

Youth career
- EF Luis Calvo
- Bergantiños
- 2014–2015: Celta

Senior career*
Years	Team	Apps	(Gls)
2013–2014	Bergantiños	28	(2)
2015–2016	Pontevedra B	23	(3)
2016–2017	Pontevedra	42	(0)
2017–2019	Córdoba	33	(0)
2019–2021	Andorra	44	(1)
2021–2022	Racing Ferrol	35	(0)
2022–2023	Lugo	40	(1)
2023–2025	Huesca	71	(6)
2025–	Deportivo A Coruña	40	(0)

International career
2024	Galicia	1	(0)
- * Club domestic league appearances and goals as of 30 August 2026

Miguel Loureiro Ameijenda (born 21 November 1996) is a Spanish footballer who plays as a right-back for Deportivo de A Coruña.

== Club career ==
Born in Cerceda, A Coruña, Galicia, Loureiro made his senior debut with Bergantiños FC on 24 August 2013 at the age of 16, starting in a 2–1 away win against CA Rivera for the Preferente de Galicia championship. He scored his first senior goal on 1 December, netting the first in a 1–1 home draw against CF Dumbría.

On 21 July 2014, Loureiro joined Celta de Vigo, returning to youth football. On 25 August of the following year, after being deemed surplus to requirements, he signed for Pontevedra CF, being initially assigned to the reserves.

On 15 June 2016 Loureiro renewed with the Granates, and became an undisputed starter for the first team in Segunda División B during the season, as his side reached the play-offs. On 2 July of the following year, he signed a three-year contract with Segunda División side Córdoba CF.

Loureiro made his professional debut on 6 September 2017, starting in a 4–2 away defeat of Lorca FC, for the season's Copa del Rey. On 26 June 2019, after suffering relegation, he terminated his contract, and joined FC Andorra in the third division on 9 August.

On 21 June 2021, Loureiro signed for Racing de Ferrol in the newly-formed Primera División RFEF. On 1 August of the following year, he returned to the second division after agreeing to a two-year contract with CD Lugo.

On 3 July 2023, after Lugo's relegation, Loureiro signed a two-year deal with SD Huesca also in division two. On 15 April 2025, he agreed to a one-year extension.

On 1 August 2025, Loureiro moved to fellow second division side Deportivo de La Coruña on a three-year contract. He was a regular starter during the campaign as the club achieved promotion to La Liga, and made his debut in that category at the age of 29 on 24 August 2026, starting in a 1–1 away draw against Málaga CF.
