= Hugo Vallejo =

Spanish footballer

Personal information
- Full name: Hugo Claudio Vallejo Avilés
- Date of birth: 15 February 2000 (age 26)
- Place of birth: Granada, Spain
- Height: 1.85 m (6 ft 1 in)
- Position: Winger

Team information
- Current team: Piast Gliwice
- Number: 80

Youth career
- 2008–2015: Granada
- 2015–2018: Málaga

Senior career*
Years	Team	Apps	(Gls)
2018–2020	Málaga B	27	(2)
2018–2020	Málaga	8	(0)
2020–2021	Real Madrid B	23	(4)
2020	→ Deportivo La Coruña (loan)	13	(1)
2021–2023	Valladolid	2	(0)
2022–2023	→ Ponferradina (loan)	29	(3)
2023–2025	Huesca	61	(4)
2025–	Piast Gliwice	39	(9)

International career
2018	Spain U19	1	(0)
- * Club domestic league appearances and goals as of 21:11, 25 October 2026 (UTC)

Hugo Claudio Vallejo Avilés (born 15 February 2000) is a Spanish professional footballer who plays as a right winger for Ekstraklasa club Piast Gliwice.

== Club career ==
Born in Granada, Andalusia, Vallejo joined Málaga CF's youth setup in 2015, from Granada CF. He made his senior debut with the reserves on 28 October 2018, coming on as a half-time substitute in a 0–1 Segunda División B away loss against UD Almería B.

Vallejo scored his first senior goal on 25 November 2018, netting the winner in a 2–1 home defeat of Atlético Sanluqueño CF. He made his first team debut the following 6 January, replacing Dani Pacheco in a 0–3 loss at CF Reus Deportiu in the Segunda División championship.

On 14 January 2020, Málaga announced the transfer of Vallejo to Real Madrid, and he was loaned to Deportivo de La Coruña for the remainder of the season eleven days later. Upon returning, he was assigned to the reserves in the third division.

On 25 August 2021, Vallejo signed a three-year contract with Real Valladolid, recently relegated to the second division. On 1 September of the following year, after featuring rarely, he was loaned to SD Ponferradina for one year.

On 31 August 2023, Vallejo terminated his link with Valladolid, and signed a two-year deal with fellow second division side SD Huesca the following day.

On 13 August 2025, Vallejo moved to Polish club Piast Gliwice on a free transfer, signing a three-year deal.
