= Ignasi Vilarrasa =

Spanish footballer

Personal information
- Full name: Ignasi Vilarrasa Palacios
- Date of birth: 23 August 1999 (age 27)
- Place of birth: Granollers, Spain
- Height: 1.83 m (6 ft 0 in)
- Position: Left back

Team information
- Current team: Burgos

Youth career
- La Torreta
- 2007–2009: Barcelona
- 2009–2010: Mollet
- 2010–2016: Damm
- 2016–2018: Cornellà

Senior career*
Years	Team	Apps	(Gls)
2018–2019	Barcelona B	10	(1)
2018	→ Cornellà (loan)	9	(0)
2019–2021	Valladolid B	62	(3)
2021	Valladolid	0	(0)
2021–2022	Atlético Baleares	34	(2)
2022–2025	Huesca	110	(5)
2025–2026	Córdoba	21	(1)
2026–	Burgos	0	(0)
- * Club domestic league appearances and goals as of 6 June 2026

Ignasi Vilarrasa Palacios (born 23 August 1999) is a Spanish professional footballer who plays as a left back for Burgos CF.

== Club career ==
Born in Granollers, Barcelona, Catalonia, Vilarrasa joined FC Barcelona's La Masia in 2007, from CF La Torreta. Released in 2009, he subsequently represented CF Mollet, CF Damm and UE Cornellà, finishing his formation with the latter in 2018.

In August 2018, Vilarrasa returned to Barça after agreeing to a three-year contract, but returned to Cornellà on loan for the season. He made his senior debut on 6 October, starting in a 0–0 Segunda División B away draw against CD Castellón.

On 28 December 2018, after just nine league matches, Vilarrasa returned to Barcelona and was assigned to the reserves also in the third division. The following 3 September, he signed a three-year deal with another reserve team, Real Valladolid Promesas in the same category.

Vilarrasa made his first team debut on 5 January 2021, starting in a 3–2 away win against Marbella FC, for the season's Copa del Rey. His professional debut occurred on the 26th, as he played the full 90 minutes in a 2–4 home loss against Levante UD, also for the national cup. At the end of his contract at Valladolid he signed for Atlético Baleares in the third division.

On 5 July 2022, Vilarrasa signed a two-year contract with SD Huesca in Segunda División. He scored his first professional goal on 13 August 2023, netting the opener in a 1–1 away draw against Burgos CF.

On 1 April 2024, after establishing himself as a regular starter for the Aragonese side, Vilarrasa renewed his link with the club until 2025. On 11 August of the following year, he moved to fellow second division side Córdoba CF on a two-year deal.

On 4 August 2026, Vilarrasa was announced at Burgos also in the second division on a one-year contract.
