= Jorge Pulido =

Spanish footballer (born 1991)

Personal information
- Full name: Jorge Pulido Mayoral
- Date of birth: 8 April 1991 (age 35)
- Place of birth: Castillo de Bayuela, Spain
- Height: 1.86 m (6 ft 1 in)
- Position: Centre-back

Team information
- Current team: Almería
- Number: 5

Youth career
- Talavera
- 1999–2009: Atlético Madrid

Senior career*
Years	Team	Apps	(Gls)
2009–2011	Atlético Madrid B	44	(3)
2011–2013	Atlético Madrid	3	(0)
2012	→ Rayo Vallecano (loan)	14	(0)
2013–2014	Real Madrid B	19	(0)
2014–2016	Albacete	46	(7)
2016–2017	Sint-Truiden	13	(2)
2017–2026	Huesca	314	(16)
2026–	Almería	9	(0)

International career
2008	Spain U17	5	(2)
2008–2010	Spain U19	20	(0)
2011	Spain U20	4	(0)
Medal record
Men's football
Representing Spain
UEFA European Under-17 Championship
Winner	2008 Türkiye
- * Club domestic league appearances and goals as of 21:44, 15 November 2026 (UTC)

Jorge Pulido Mayoral (born 8 April 1991) is a Spanish professional footballer who plays as a central defender for Segunda División club Almería.

== Club career ==
=== Atlético Madrid ===
Born in the village of Castillo de Bayuela in Castilla–La Mancha, Pulido arrived at Atlético Madrid's youth system at the age of 8. He made his senior debut in the 2009–10 season, appearing with their reserves in the Segunda División B.

Pulido made his official debut with the Colchoneros's first team on 10 November 2010, playing the entire 1–1 home draw against Universidad de Las Palmas CF in the round of 32 of the Copa del Rey (6–1 aggregate win). On 18 February of the following year, he extended his contract with the club by signing until 2014.

On 15 May 2011, benefitting from injuries to Diego Godín and Luis Perea and the suspension of Tomáš Ujfaluši, Pulido made his first La Liga appearance, playing the full 90 minutes and being booked after committing a penalty in a 2–1 home victory over Hércules CF, as the team finally qualified for the UEFA Europa League as seventh. On 27 January 2012, he was loaned to fellow top-division side Rayo Vallecano until June.

=== Castilla and Albacete ===
After being a regular starter with Rayo, Pulido returned to Atlético in the summer of 2012, but after being again underplayed he moved across the city to Real Madrid on 19 July 2013, being assigned to the reserves in the Segunda División. He suffered relegation with the latter and was released, subsequently joining Albacete Balompié also in that tier.

Pulido scored his first professional goal on 25 January 2015, his team's second in a 3–2 win at AD Alcorcón.

=== Sint-Truiden ===
In June 2016, after Albacete's relegation, Pulido moved abroad for the first time to Sint-Truidense VV of Belgium on a three-year deal. In the third game of the season, he was sent off in a goalless draw with RSC Anderlecht for a foul on Trézéguet, earning him a two-match ban and €800 fine.

=== Huesca ===
Pulido went back to Spain's second tier on 6 July 2017, on a two-year contract at SD Huesca. He played all bar three matches as the Aragonese club reached the top flight for the first time, scoring in the 2–0 away defeat of CD Lugo on 21 May 2018 that confirmed it.

The team was immediately relegated, and Pulido was sent off in his last two appearances of the campaign. In late January 2019, he agreed to a three-year extension at the Estadio El Alcoraz.

In 2019–20, Pulido captained Huesca to the second division title. He wore a new armband design in every away game to honour the host city, such as a guitar at Cádiz CF.

On 26 April 2026, Pulido was pushed by Real Zaragoza's Esteban Andrada in injury time of a 1–0 home win, and the goalkeeper was given a straight red card, following which he landed a punch on Pulido; his teammate Dani Jiménez and opponent Dani Tasende were also ejected in the match later on.

=== Almería ===
On 29 June 2026, Pulido joined fellow second-tier side UD Almería on a two-year contract.

== International career ==
Pulido participated in the 2008 UEFA European Under-17 Championship with Spain, helping his country to eventual victory in the tournament and scoring two goals.

== Honours ==
Atlético Madrid

- Copa del Rey: 2012–13

Huesca

- Segunda División: 2019–20

Spain U17

- UEFA European Under-17 Championship: 2008

Spain U19

- UEFA European Under-19 Championship runner-up: 2010
