= Dani Jiménez =

Spanish footballer (born 1990)

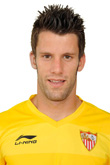
- Jiménez with Sevilla in 2011

Personal information
- Full name: Daniel Jiménez López
- Date of birth: 5 March 1990 (age 36)
- Place of birth: Lebrija, Spain
- Height: 1.79 m (5 ft 10 in)
- Position: Goalkeeper

Team information
- Current team: Murcia

Youth career
- Sevilla

Senior career*
Years	Team	Apps	(Gls)
2009–2010	Sevilla C	17	(0)
2009–2012	Sevilla B	53	(0)
2012–2014	Mirandés	22	(0)
2014–2015	Huesca	38	(0)
2015–2022	Alcorcón	139	(0)
2022–2024	Leganés	27	(0)
2024–2026	Huesca	70	(0)
2026–	Murcia	0	(0)
- * Club domestic league appearances and goals as of 31 May 2026

Daniel 'Dani' Jiménez López (born 5 March 1990) is a Spanish professional footballer who plays as a goalkeeper for Real Murcia.

== Club career ==
Born in Lebrija, Andalusia, Jiménez finished his youth career with Sevilla FC, making his senior debut with the C team in the 2009–10 season, in the Tercera División. The same year, he also featured for the reserves in the Segunda División B.

Jiménez signed a contract with Segunda División club CD Mirandés on 10 August 2012. He played his first game as a professional on 8 June 2013, starting in a 2–1 home win against Sporting de Gijón.

On 21 July 2014, Jiménez joined SD Huesca of the third tier. The following summer, he returned to division two with AD Alcorcón.

An undisputed starter for Alkor, Jiménez played all the league minutes in the 2020–21 campaign, and on 16 September 2021 he renewed his contract until 2024. The following 31 January, however, he terminated his link, and signed a two-and-a-half-year deal with fellow second division side CD Leganés later that day.

Jiménez backed up Asier Riesgo first and Diego Conde later during his spell, achieving La Liga promotion in 2023–24 as champions. On 28 June 2024, he returned to Huesca on a two-year contract.

On 16 June 2026, the 36-year-old Jiménez signed for Primera Federación side Real Murcia CF.

== Career statistics ==
As of match played 31 May 2026

Appearances and goals by club, season and competition
Club	Season	League			National Cup		Europe		Other		Total	
Club	Season	Division	Apps	Goals	Apps	Goals	Apps	Goals	Apps	Goals	Apps	Goals
Sevilla B	2009–10	Segunda División B	12	0	—		—		—		12	0
Sevilla B	2010–11	Segunda División B	23	0	—		—		4 (Note: Appearances in Segunda División B play-offs)	0	27	0
Sevilla B	2011–12	Segunda División B	18	0	—		—		—		18	0
Sevilla B	Total		53	0	—		—		4	0	57	0
Sevilla	2010–11	La Liga	0	0	0	0	0	0	—		0	0
Sevilla	2011–12	La Liga	0	0	0	0	—		—		0	0
Sevilla	Total		0	0	0	0	0	0	—		0	0
Mirandés	2012–13	Segunda División	1	0	0	0	—		—		1	0
Mirandés	2013–14	Segunda División	21	0	1	0	—		—		22	0
Mirandés	Total		22	0	1	0	—		—		23	0
Huesca	2014–15	Segunda División B	38	0	5	0	—		6	0	49	0
Alcorcón	2015–16	Segunda División	4	0	1	0	—		—		5	0
Alcorcón	2016–17	Segunda División	2	0	7	0	—		—		9	0
Alcorcón	2017–18	Segunda División	4	0	1	0	—		—		5	0
Alcorcón	2018–19	Segunda División	30	0	0	0	—		—		30	0
Alcorcón	2019–20	Segunda División	34	0	0	0	—		—		34	0
Alcorcón	2020–21	Segunda División	42	0	1	0	—		—		43	0
Alcorcón	2021–22	Segunda División	24	0	0	0	—		—		24	0
Alcorcón	Total		139	0	10	0	—		—		149	0
Leganés	2021–22	Segunda División	13	0	—		—		—		13	0
Leganés	2022–23	Segunda División	10	0	0	0	—		—		10	0
Leganés	2023–24	Segunda División	4	0	2	0	—		—		6	0
Leganés	Total		27	0	2	0	—		—		29	0
Huesca	2024–25	Segunda División	32	0	0	0	—		—		32	0
Huesca	2025–26	Segunda División	38	0	0	0	—		—		38	0
Huesca	Total		70	0	0	0	—		—		70	0
Career total			349	0	18	0	0	0	10	0	377	0

== Honours ==
Leganés

- Segunda División: 2023–24
