= Patrick Soko =

Cameroonian footballer

Personal information
- Full name: Serge Patrick Njoh Soko
- Date of birth: 31 October 1997 (age 29)
- Place of birth: Douala, Cameroon
- Height: 1.76 m (5 ft 9 in)
- Position: Winger

Team information
- Current team: Leganés (on loan from Almería)

Youth career
- 2005–2011: Union Douala
- 2012–2015: Astres FC

Senior career*
Years	Team	Apps	(Gls)
2016–2017	Cibao	21	(4)
2017–2018	Atlas	8	(0)
2019	Atlante	14	(6)
2020	Mineros de Zacatecas	8	(0)
2020–2022	Racing Santander	51	(9)
2022–2025	Huesca	59	(13)
2023–2024	→ Ibiza (loan)	38	(9)
2025–	Almería	21	(0)
2026–	→ Leganés (loan)	0	(0)

International career^{‡}
2024–	Cameroon	5	(1)
- * Club domestic league appearances and goals as of 3 June 2026 ‡ National team caps and goals as of 4 January 2026

Serge Patrick Njoh Soko (born 31 October 1997) is a Cameroonian footballer who plays as a winger for Segunda División club CD Leganés, on loan from UD Almería, and the Cameroon national team.

== Club career ==
Soko played for local sides Union Douala and Astres FC before making his senior debut with Dominican side Cibao FC in 2016. In the following year, he joined Liga MX side Atlas.

In 2018, Soko moved to Atlante in the Ascenso MX. He signed for Mineros de Zacatecas in 2020, before joining Spanish Segunda División B side Racing de Santander on 23 September of that year.

Soko was a regular starter for the Verdiblancos, helping the side to win the 2021–22 Primera División RFEF. On 10 June 2022, he agreed to a two-year deal with SD Huesca in the Segunda División.

On 24 August 2023, Soko was loaned to third division side UD Ibiza for the 2023–24 season. Upon returning, he became a key unit for Huesca and scored 13 goals in 2024–25, but still left the club in June 2025.

On 25 June 2025, UD Almería announced the signing of Soko on a three-year contract. Following a 2026 season with limited first-team opportunities at Almería, he was loaned to fellow second division side CD Leganés on 1 August 2026.

== International career ==
On 5 October 2024, Soko received his first call-up to the Cameroon national team, for two matches against Kenya. He made his full international debut on 13 November, coming on as a late substitute in a 0–0 draw against Namibia for the 2025 Africa Cup of Nations qualifiers.

Soko scored his first international goal on 6 June 2025, in a 3–0 win over Uganda.

== Personal life ==
Soko is married to Brazilian model Vanessa Crippa, winner of the 2015 Miss Brasil Globo.

== Career statistics ==
=== Club ===
As of match played 14 December 2025

Appearances and goals by club, season and competition
Club	Season	League			National Cup		Other		Total	
Club	Season	Division	Apps	Goals	Apps	Goals	Apps	Goals	Apps	Goals
Atlas	2017–18	Liga MX	8	0	7	1	—		15	1
Atlante	2018–19	Ascenso MX	14	6	1	0	—		15	6
Atlante	2019–20	Ascenso MX	14	0	4	0	—		18	0
Atlante	Total		28	6	5	0	0	0	33	6
Mineros de Zacatecas	2019–20	Ascenso MX	8	0	0	0	—		8	0
Racing Santander	2020–21	Segunda División B	17	3	1	0	—		18	3
Racing Santander	2021–22	Primera Federación	34	6	0	0	—		34	6
Racing Santander	Total		51	9	1	0	0	0	52	9
Huesca	2022–23	Segunda División	22	0	1	0	—		23	0
Huesca	2024–25	Segunda División	37	13	2	0	—		39	13
Huesca	Total		59	13	3	0	—		62	13
Ibiza (loan)	2023–24	Primera Federación	38	9	1	0	2	0	41	9
Almería	2025–26	Segunda División	14	0	2	1	—		16	1
Career total			206	37	19	2	2	0	227	39

=== International ===
As of match played 4 January 2026

Appearances and goals by national team and year
National team	Year	Apps	Goals
Cameroon	2024	2	0
Cameroon	2025	2	1
Cameroon	2026	1	0
Total		5	1

=== International goals ===
Scores and results list Cameroon's goal tally first.

No	Date	Venue	Opponent	Score	Result	Competition	Ref(s)
1	6 June 2025	Marrakesh Stadium Annexe, Marrakesh, Morocco	Uganda	3–0	3–0	Friendly	
