= Juan Pérez (footballer, born 1996) =

Spanish footballer

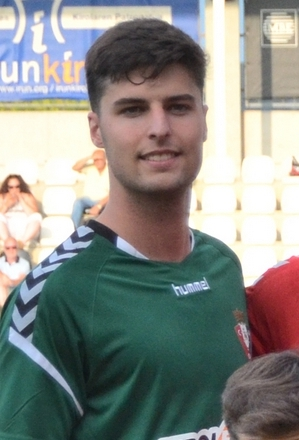
- Pérez with Osasuna in 2018

Personal information
- Full name: Juan Manuel Pérez Ruiz
- Date of birth: 15 July 1996 (age 30)
- Place of birth: Almudévar, Spain
- Height: 1.87 m (6 ft 2 in)
- Position: Goalkeeper

Youth career
- Huesca
- 2013–2014: Osasuna

Senior career*
Years	Team	Apps	(Gls)
2014–2018	Osasuna B	78	(0)
2018–2023	Osasuna	7	(0)
2023–2026	Huesca	10	(0)
- * Club domestic league appearances and goals as of 19 June 2025

Juan Manuel Pérez Ruiz (born 15 July 1996) is a Spanish footballer who plays as a goalkeeper.

== Club career ==
Born in Almudévar, Huesca, Aragon, Pérez joined CA Osasuna's youth setup in June 2013 at the age of 16, from SD Huesca. On 26 October 2014 he made his senior debut with the reserves, starting in a 2–1 Tercera División home win against CD Iruña.

On 8 June 2017, Pérez agreed to a professional contract, but remained appearing regularly with the B's. On 19 August 2018, as both first-team goalkeepers Sergio Herrera and Rubén Martínez were injured, he made his professional debut by starting in a 0–1 away loss against RCD Mallorca in the Segunda División.

On 27 November 2019, Pérez renewed his contract until 2022, and made his La Liga debut four days later, starting in a 4–2 away defeat of RCD Espanyol.

On 20 January 2023, Pérez signed a three-and-a-half-year contract with SD Huesca in division two.

== Career statistics ==
=== Club ===
As of match played 2 June 2024

Appearances and goals by club, season and competition
Club	Season	League			National Cup		Other		Total	
Club	Season	Division	Apps	Goals	Apps	Goals	Apps	Goals	Apps	Goals
Osasuna B	2014–15	Tercera División	16	0	—		5 (Note: Appearance(s) in Promotion Playoffs)	0	21	0
Osasuna B	2015–16	Tercera División	20	0	—		2	0	22	0
Osasuna B	2016–17	Segunda División B	18	0	—		—		18	0
Osasuna B	2017–18	Segunda División B	24	0	—		—		24	0
Osasuna B	Total		78	0	0	0	7	0	85	0
Osasuna	2014–15	Segunda División	0	0	0	0	—		0	0
Osasuna	2015–16	Segunda División	0	0	0	0	0	0	0	0
Osasuna	2016–17	La Liga	0	0	0	0	—		0	0
Osasuna	2017–18	Segunda División	0	0	0	0	—		0	0
Osasuna	2018–19	Segunda División	2	0	1	0	—		3	0
Osasuna	2019–20	La Liga	2	0	3	0	—		5	0
Osasuna	2020–21	La Liga	3	0	2	0	—		5	0
Osasuna	2021–22	La Liga	2	0	1	0	—		3	0
Osasuna	2022–23	La Liga	0	0	1	0	—		1	0
Osasuna	Total		9	0	8	0	0	0	17	0
Huesca	2022–23	Segunda División	0	0	—		—		0	0
Huesca	2023–24	Segunda División	1	0	3	0	—		4	0
Huesca	Total		1	0	3	0	—		4	0
Career total			88	0	11	0	7	0	106	0

== Honours ==
Osasuna

- Segunda División: 2018–19
