= Óscar Sielva =

Spanish footballer

Personal information
- Full name: Óscar Sielva Moreno
- Date of birth: 6 August 1991 (age 35)
- Place of birth: Olot, Spain
- Height: 1.78 m (5 ft 10 in)
- Position: Midfielder

Team information
- Current team: Huesca
- Number: 23

Youth career
- 1996–2000: Sant Roc
- 2000–2006: Garrotxa
- 2006–2008: Espanyol

Senior career*
| Years | Team | Apps | (Gls) |
| 2008–2011 | Espanyol B | 43 | (7) |
| 2008–2011 | Espanyol | 5 | (0) |
| 2009–2010 | → Cartagena (loan) | 7 | (0) |
| 2012–2013 | Málaga B | 45 | (4) |
| 2014–2015 | Olot | 26 | (1) |
| 2015–2016 | Marbella | 34 | (1) |
| 2016 | Europa | 9 | (0) |
| 2017 | Somozas | 17 | (0) |
| 2017–2018 | Rápido Bouzas | 34 | (5) |
| 2018–2021 | Ponferradina | 103 | (11) |
| 2021–2023 | Eibar | 18 | (0) |
| 2022–2023 | → Huesca (loan) | 23 | (2) |
| 2023– | Huesca | 108 | (16) |

International career
| 2008 | Spain U17 | 8 | (0) |
| 2008–2010 | Spain U19 | 15 | (2) |
Medal record
Men's football
Representing Spain
UEFA European Under-17 Championship
| Winner | 2008 Turkey |
- * Club domestic league appearances and goals as of 10:40, 1 September 2026 (UTC)

Óscar Sielva Moreno (born 6 August 1991) is a Spanish professional footballer who plays as a central midfielder for Primera Federación club Huesca.

== Club career ==
Born in Olot, Girona, Catalonia, Sielva was a product of local RCD Espanyol's youth system. He made his first-team (and La Liga) debut on 30 August 2008, at the age of 17 years and 24 days, in the season opener against Real Valladolid, coming on as a substitute for Iván de la Peña in the closing stages of the game and being booked in a 1–0 home win. He appeared in four more matches in that first campaign, before fracturing his clavicle twice.

In late August 2009, Sielva was loaned to FC Cartagena, recently promoted to Segunda División. He appeared in only one sixth of the league games during the campaign, often clashing with manager Juan Ignacio Martínez who wanted to play him out of position as a winger; he returned to Espanyol in January 2010.

Deemed surplus to requirements at his parent club, Sielva was also only reinstated with the reserves in January 2011. On 14 November, he joined Málaga CF's B team in a mutual agreement between both clubs.

Sielva was released by Málaga at the end of 2012–13. He subsequently underwent trials at FC Barcelona B, Girona FC and Swansea City, with no success.

On 17 June 2014, after one year out of football, Sielva signed for UE Olot in the Segunda División B. He continued to compete in divisions three and four in the following years, representing Marbella FC, CE Europa, UD Somozas, Rápido de Bouzas and SD Ponferradina.

Sielva was an undisputed starter during his spell at the Estadio El Toralín, achieving promotion to the second tier in 2019. He scored his first goal in the competition on 27 September 2020, opening the 3–0 home victory over Rayo Vallecano.

On 21 June 2021, after scoring a career-best ten times, Sielva moved to fellow second-division side SD Eibar on a three-year contract. On 5 August of the following year, he was loaned to SD Huesca in the same league.

On 22 June 2023, Sielva signed a permanent three-year deal with Huesca.

== International career ==
Sielva was a regular for the Spain under-17 side, playing a vital role in their victory in the 2008 UEFA European Championship held in Turkey.

== Honours ==
Spain U17

- UEFA European Under-17 Championship: 2008
