= Gerard Valentín =

Spanish footballer

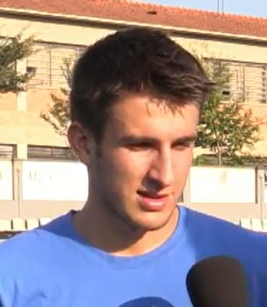
- Valentín in 2013

Personal information
- Full name: Gerard Valentín Sancho
- Date of birth: 28 July 1993 (age 33)
- Place of birth: Avinyonet, Spain
- Height: 1.77 m (5 ft 10 in)
- Positions: Right back; winger

Team information
- Current team: Tenerife
- Number: 14

Youth career
- 2003–2010: Figueres
- 2010–2012: Girona

Senior career*
Years	Team	Apps	(Gls)
2012–2013	Sevilla C	22	(1)
2013–2014	Olot	24	(0)
2014–2017	Gimnàstic	67	(0)
2017–2020	Deportivo La Coruña	4	(0)
2019–2020	→ Lugo (loan)	39	(2)
2020–2022	Lugo	54	(3)
2022–2025	Huesca	121	(4)
2025–2026	Al-Wakrah	16	(0)
2026	Al-Wakrah	8	(0)
2026-	CD Tenerife	1	(0)

International career^{‡}
2016–	Catalonia	1	(0)
- * Club domestic league appearances and goals as of 15 September 2026 ‡ National team caps and goals as of 28 December 2016

Gerard Valentín Sancho (born 28 July 1993) is a Spanish professional footballer who plays as either a right back or a right winger for CD Tenerife.

== Club career ==
Born in Avinyonet de Puigventós, Girona, Catalonia, Valentín graduated with Girona FC's youth setup, after a stint at UE Figueres. He made his debuts as a senior with Sevilla FC C in the 2012–13 campaign, in Tercera División.

On 13 July 2013, Valentín joined Segunda División B side UE Olot. On 6 July of the following year, after appearing regularly, he signed a two-year deal fellow league team Gimnàstic de Tarragona.

Valentín appeared in 24 matches for Nàstic during the campaign, winning promotion to Segunda División. He made his professional debut on 23 August, starting in a 2–2 home draw against Albacete Balompié.

On 18 January 2016, Valentín renewed his contract until 2019. On 12 July of the following year, he signed a four-year deal with La Liga side Deportivo de La Coruña.

Valentín made his top tier debut on 30 September 2017, replacing Juanfran in a 2–1 home defeat of Getafe CF. However, he featured rarely as his side suffered relegation.

On 15 January 2019, Valentín was loaned to CD Lugo in the second division, for six months. On 12 August, his loan was extended for the 2019–20 campaign.

On 14 September 2020, after Dépor's relegation, Valentín agreed to a permanent two-year contract with Lugo. On 27 January 2022, he moved to fellow second division side SD Huesca on a four-and-a-half-year deal.

On 8 August 2025, Valentín moved abroad for the first time in his career, joining Qatar Stars League side Al-Wakrah SC. He returned to Spain and its second division on 1 September of the following year, joining CD Tenerife on a one-year contract.

== International career ==
On 28 December 2016, Valentín made his debut for the Catalonia national football team, coming on as a half-time substitute for Pol Lirola in a 3–3 draw against Tunisia (2–4 penalty loss).

== Personal life ==
Valentín's younger brother, Pol, is also a footballer and a right back. He also played for Figueres. Their father Albert was also a right back, and also played for Figueres.
