= Iker Kortajarena =

Spanish association football player

Personal information
- Full name: Iker Kortajarena Canellada
- Date of birth: 21 June 2000 (age 26)
- Place of birth: Oiartzun, Spain
- Height: 1.79 m (5 ft 10 in)
- Position: Attacking midfielder

Team information
- Current team: Al-Kholood
- Number: 10

Youth career
- Real Sociedad

Senior career*
Years	Team	Apps	(Gls)
2019–2022	Real Sociedad C	78	(18)
2021–2023	Real Sociedad B	37	(5)
2023–2026	Huesca	90	(8)
2026–	Al-Kholood	23	(5)
- * Club domestic league appearances and goals as of 9 September 2026

Iker Kortajarena Canellada (born 21 June 2000) is a Spanish professional footballer who plays as an attacking midfielder for Saudi Pro League club Al-Kholood Club.

== Club career ==
Born in Oiartzun, Gipuzkoa, Basque Country, Kortajarena was a Real Sociedad youth graduate. He made his senior debut with the C-team on 16 February 2019, coming on as a second-half substitute for Daniel Garrido in a 0–0 Tercera División home draw against SD Beasain.

Kortajarena scored his first senior goal on 13 April 2019, netting the C's fourth in a 4–1 home routing of Pasaia KE. During the 2020–21 campaign, he scored nine goals as the C-side achieved promotion to Segunda División RFEF.

Kortajarena made his professional debut with the reserves on 4 September 2021, coming on as a second-half substitute for Luca Sangalli in a 0–1 away loss against FC Cartagena in the Segunda División championship. He was definitely promoted to the B-side ahead of the 2022–23 season, with the club now in Primera Federación.

On 29 June 2023, Kortajarena signed a two-year contract with SD Huesca in division two. He scored his first professional goal on 21 December, netting his team's third in a 3–0 home win over FC Cartagena.

On 31 January 2026, Kortajarena left Huesca after paying his release clause, and signed a three-and-a-half-year deal with Saudi Pro League club Al-Kholood Club two days later.
