= Jaime Seoane =

Spanish footballer (born 1997)

Personal information
- Full name: Jaime Seoane Valenciano
- Date of birth: 22 January 1997 (age 29)
- Place of birth: Madrid, Spain
- Height: 1.74 m (5 ft 9 in)
- Position: Midfielder

Youth career
- 2003–2006: Aluche
- 2006–2016: Real Madrid

Senior career*
Years	Team	Apps	(Gls)
2016–2019	Real Madrid B	90	(8)
2017–2019	Real Madrid	0	(0)
2019–2022	Huesca	72	(15)
2020	→ Lugo (loan)	12	(0)
2022–2023	Getafe	16	(0)
2023–2025	Pachuca	0	(0)
2023–2025	→ Oviedo (loan)	65	(7)
2026	Huesca	12	(0)
- * Club domestic league appearances and goals as of 2 June 2026

Jaime Seoane Valenciano (born 22 January 1997) is a Spanish professional footballer who plays as a midfielder.

== Club career ==
Born in Madrid, Seoane joined Real Madrid's La Fábrica at the age of nine, from EMF Aluche. Promoted to the reserves for the 2016–17 season, he made his senior debut on 20 August 2016 by starting in a 3–2 Segunda División B home defeat of Real Sociedad B.

On 26 April 2017, Seoane extended his contract with Los Blancos until 2020. He scored his first goal for Castilla on 1 November, scoring his team's second in a 4–1 away routing of Celta de Vigo B.

Seoane made his first team debut on 28 November 2017, coming on as a late substitute for Mateo Kovačić in 2–2 home draw against CF Fuenlabrada, for the season's Copa del Rey. He would resume his career at the club appearing for the B's, however.

On 6 August 2019, Seoane signed a three-year deal with Segunda División side SD Huesca. He made his professional debut twelve days later, replacing Mikel Rico in a 1–0 away defeat of UD Las Palmas.

On 31 January 2020, after appearing rarely, Seoane was loaned to fellow second division side CD Lugo, until June. Upon returning to his parent club, he made his La Liga debut on 13 September, replacing Mikel Rico late into a 1–1 away draw against Villarreal CF.

Seoane scored his first goal in the main category of Spanish football on 30 December 2020, but in a 2–1 loss at RC Celta de Vigo. A regular starter as Huesca immediately returned to the second division, he scored 14 goals during the 2021–22 campaign.

On 1 July 2022, free agent Seoane signed a three-year contract with Getafe CF in the top tier. On 4 August of the following year, after being sparingly used, he signed a one-year deal with second division side Real Oviedo.

On 30 January 2026, after six months without a club, Seoane returned to Huesca on a short-term deal.

== Career statistics ==
As of 16 August 2020

Appearances and goals by club, season and competition
Club	Season	League			Cup		Other		Total	
Club	Season	Division	Apps	Goals	Apps	Goals	Apps	Goals	Apps	Goals
Real Madrid B	2016-17	Segunda División B	19	0	—		—		19	0
Real Madrid B	2017-18	Segunda División B	34	5	—		—		34	5
Real Madrid B	2018-19	Segunda División B	37	3	—		2 (Note: appearances in 2019 Segunda División B play-offs)	0	39	3
Real Madrid B	Total		90	8	0	0	2	0	92	8
Real Madrid	2017-18	La Liga	0	0	1	0	—		1	0
SD Huesca	2019-20	Segunda División	4	0	2	0	—		6	0
Lugo (loan)	2019-20	Segunda División	12	0	0	0	—		12	0
Career total			106	8	3	0	2	0	111	8
