= Estadio El Alcoraz =

Football stadium in Huesca, Spain

El Alcoraz
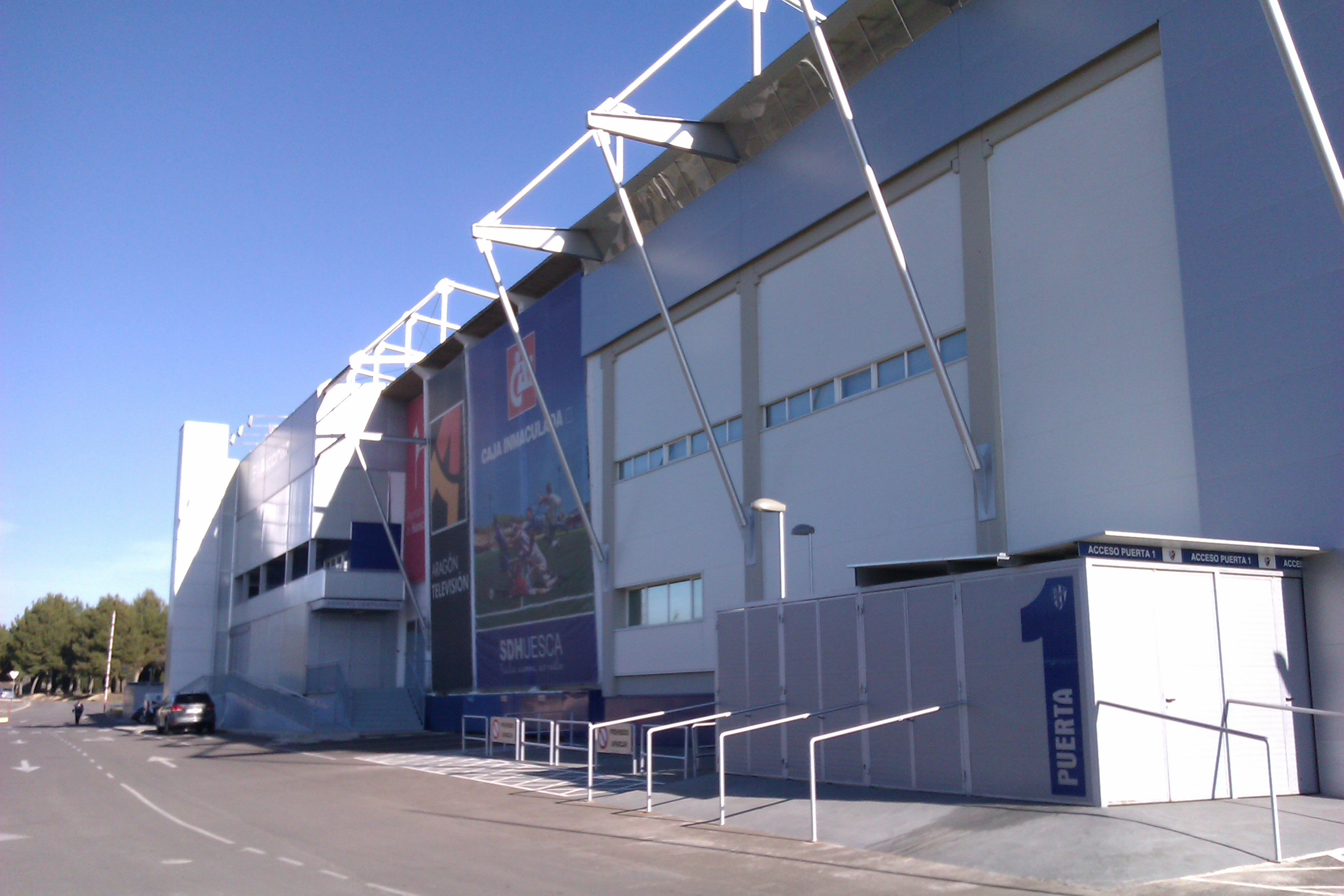
- Interactive map of El Alcoraz
- Location: Huesca, Spain
- Coordinates: 42°07′55″N 00°25′28″W
- Owner: SD Huesca
- Operator: SD Huesca
- Capacity: 9,100
- Record attendance: 7,968 (Huesca v Betis; 5 January 2025)
- Field size: 105 m × 68 m (344 ft × 223 ft)

Construction
- Opened: 1972
- Renovated: 2010, 2018

Tenant
- SD Huesca (1972—present)

Estadio El Alcoraz is a football stadium in the city of Huesca, Aragon, Spain. It serves as the home ground of the city's foremost professional football club, SD Huesca. It was named after the battle of Alcoraz which took place there in 1096.

It is located next to San Jorge's hill and it has a capacity of 7,638 people. The architect Raimundo Bambó was in charge of stadium's design and construction. The cost of his work was covered thanks to the efforts of José Maria Mur, the club's president at that time. He was the one who suggested building a stadium and started the project, which lasted for 4 years. The stadium's cost amounted to approximately 15 million pesetas (about 90,000 euros).

It was opened on January 16, 1972, with a match between SD Huesca and Deportivo Aragón. In 1986, with the club drowning debts, the stadium went to auction. About 200 managers and fans of the club joined to form a society that won the auction, thus rescuing the stadium from the bank's embargo. Since then it has witnessed many social and sport events. These include a Copa del Rey match in 1990 between SD Huesca and Cádiz CF, which took place on December 13 and ended in a 0:0 tie followed by the Cádiz CF win by penalty shoot-out in the second game. As well as a match between Spain's Under-21 national football team and Greece, which took place on June 6, 2003, and ended in Spain winning 2–0.

In the 2008/2009 season, after the promotion of SD Huesca to Segunda División, there were important enhancements in the stadium: roof building, extension of the central stand, reconstruction of the presidential box, changing rooms, offices, and benches.

With the promotion of Huesca to La Liga, the stadium was expanded from less than 5,500 seats to 7,638 seats in 2018 . The stadium underwent an extensive renovation. The changes have affected the stands, VIP guests boxes and spaces, the press room, mixed zone, toilets, bars, and the parking.
