= 2021–22 Real Sociedad B season =

Real Sociedad B
2021–22 season
- President: Jokin Aperribay
- Head coach: Xabi Alonso
- Stadium: Anoeta
- Segunda División: 20th (relegated)
- Top goalscorer: League: Jon Karrikaburu (11); All: Jon Karrikaburu (11)
Home colours	Away colours

The 2021–22 season was the 67th season in the existence of Real Sociedad B and the club's first season back in the second division of Spanish football since 1962.

== Players ==
=== First-team squad ===
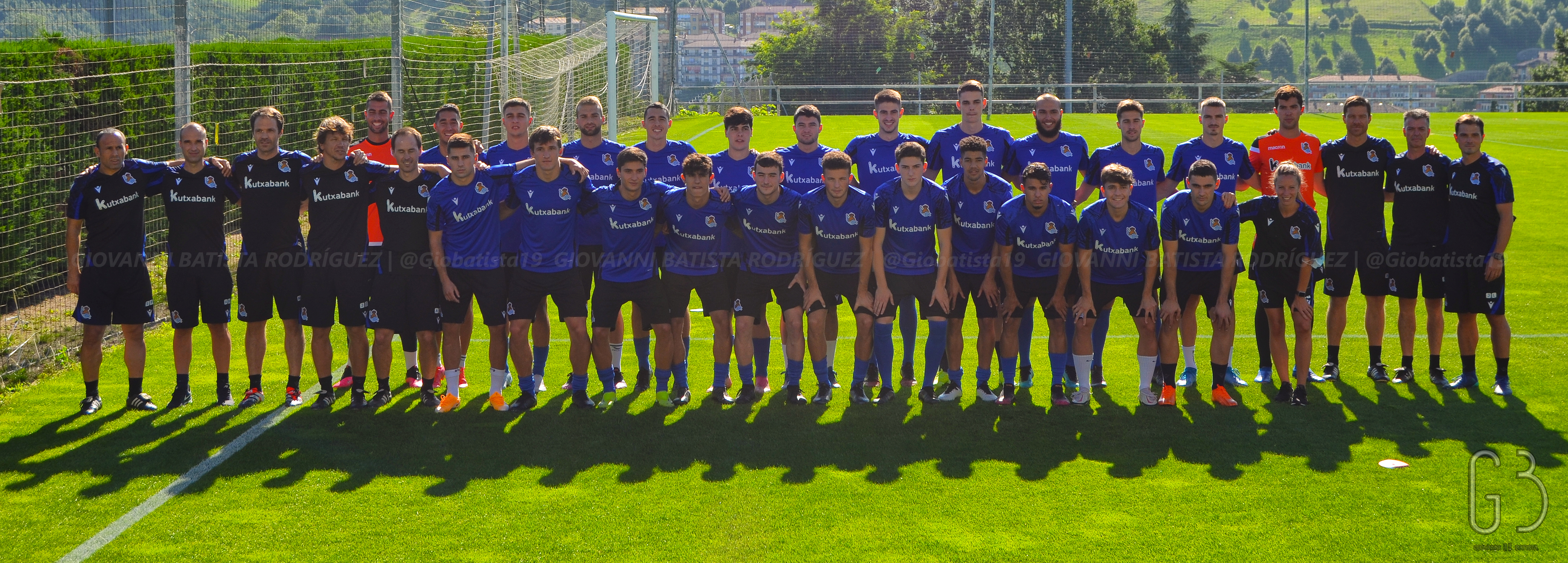
Real Sociedad B players in training in July 2021.

As of 9 January 2022

Note: Flags indicate national team as defined under FIFA eligibility rules; some limited exceptions apply. Players may hold more than one non-FIFA nationality.

No.	Pos.	Nation	Player
1	GK	ESP	Gaizka Ayesa
2	DF	ESP	Álex Sola
3	DF	USA	Jonathan Gómez
4	MF	ESP	Jon Ander Olasagasti
5	DF	ESP	Aritz Arambarri
6	DF	ESP	Urko González de Zárate
7	FW	ESP	Xeber Alkain
8	MF	ESP	Aritz Aldasoro
9	FW	ESP	Jon Karrikaburu
10	MF	ESP	Roberto López (captain)
11	FW	ESP	Julen Lobete
12	DF	ESP	Jon Pacheco
13	GK	ESP	Andoni Zubiaurre

No.	Pos.	Nation	Player
14	MF	ESP	Beñat Turrientes
15	DF	FRA	Jérémy Blasco
16	DF	ESP	Cristo Romero (on loan from Málaga)
17	MF	ESP	Germán Valera (on loan from Atlético Madrid)
18	MF	SVK	Peter Pokorný
19	FW	ESP	Javier Martón
20	FW	ESP	Ander Martín
21	FW	FRA	Naïs Djouahra
22	MF	ESP	Daniel Garrido
23	MF	ESP	Luca Sangalli
24	MF	ESP	Robert Navarro
25	DF	ESP	Enrique Clemente (on loan from Zaragoza)
32	GK	ESP	Unai Marrero

=== Reserve team ===
Note: Flags indicate national team as defined under FIFA eligibility rules; some limited exceptions apply. Players may hold more than one non-FIFA nationality.

No.	Pos.	Nation	Player
26	MF	ESP	Alberto Dadie
27	DF	ESP	Alex Carbonell
29	MF	ESP	Iker Kortajarena
31	MF	ESP	Jon Magunacelaya
33	DF	ESP	Yago Cantero

No.	Pos.	Nation	Player
35	GK	ESP	José Ortega
36	MF	ESP	Pablo Marín
37	DF	ESP	Peru Rodríguez
39	DF	ESP	Jokin Gabilondo
40	GK	ESP	Egoitz Arana

=== Out on loan ===
Note: Flags indicate national team as defined under FIFA eligibility rules; some limited exceptions apply. Players may hold more than one non-FIFA nationality.

No.	Pos.	Nation	Player
—	DF	ESP	Imanol Ezkurdia (at Real Unión until 30 June 2022)
—	DF	ESP	Ander Zoilo (at Calahorra until 30 June 2022)
—	MF	ESP	Anatz Elizondo (at Real Unión until 30 June 2022)

No.	Pos.	Nation	Player
—	FW	ESP	Jorge Martínez-Losa (at Calahorra until 30 June 2022)
—	FW	ESP	Jorge Aguirre (at Mirandés until 30 June 2022)

== Pre-season and friendlies ==
Win Draw Loss

24 July 2021 Friendly	Real Sociedad B	1–2	Eibar	Zarautz, Spain
11:00 CEST (UTC+2)				Stadium: Estadio Asti Kirol Instalakuntzak

28 July 2021 Friendly	Sporting Gijón	0–2	Real Sociedad B	Spain
18:30 CEST (UTC+2)

31 July 2021 Friendly	Real Sociedad B	0–0	Burgos	Lasarte-Oria, Spain
19:00 CEST (UTC+2)				Stadium: Zubieta Facilities

7 August 2021 Friendly	Real Sociedad B	1–1	Mirandés	Lasarte-Oria, Spain
19:00 CEST (UTC+2)				Stadium: Zubieta Facilities

== Competitions ==
=== Overall record ===
Competition	First match	Last match	Starting round	Final position	Record							
Competition	First match	Last match	Starting round	Final position	Pld	W	D	L	GF	GA	GD	Win %
Segunda División	14 August 2021	27 May 2022	Matchday 1	20th	42	10	10	22	43	61	−18	23.81
Total					42	10	10	22	43	61	−18	23.81

Source: Soccerway

=== Segunda División ===
==== League table ====
Pos	Team	Pld	W	D	L	GF	GA	GD	Pts	Qualification or relegation
18	Málaga	42	11	12	19	36	57	−21	45	
19	Amorebieta (R)	42	9	16	17	44	63	−19	43	Relegation to Primera Federación
20	Real Sociedad B (R)	42	10	10	22	43	61	−18	40	Relegation to Primera Federación
21	Fuenlabrada (R)	42	6	15	21	39	65	−26	33	Relegation to Primera Federación
22	Alcorcón (R)	42	6	11	25	37	71	−34	29	Relegation to Primera Federación

Source: LaLiga SmartBank
Rules for classification: 1) points; 2) head-to-head points; 3) head-to-head goal difference; 4) goal difference; 5) number of goals scored
(R) Relegated

==== Results summary ====
Overall								Home						Away					
Pld	W	D	L	GF	GA	GD	Pts	W	D	L	GF	GA	GD	W	D	L	GF	GA	GD
42	10	10	22	43	61	−18	40	4	4	13	19	32	−13	6	6	9	24	29	−5

Source: La Liga SmartBank

==== Results by round ====
Round	1	2	3	4	5	6	7	8	9	10	11	12	13	14	15	16	17	18	19	20	21	22	23	24	25	26	27	28	29	30	31	32	33	34	35	36	37	38	39	40	41	42
Ground	H	A	H	A	H	A	H	A	H	H	A	A	H	A	H	A	H	A	H	A	H	A	A	H	A	H	A	H	A	H	A	H	A	H	H	A	H	A	A	H	A	H
Result	W	D	D	L	L	D	L	W	D	D	L	W	L	L	L	W	L	L	L	L	L	L	D	L	D	D	L	W	W	W	D	L	D	L	L	L	W	W	W	L	L	L
Position	6	9	10	12	17	17	20	14	16	15	17	16	18	19	20	18	19	20	20	21	21	21	21	21	21	21	21	21	19	19	19	19	20	20	20	20	20	20	20	20	20	20

Source: La Liga SmartBank
A = Away; H = Home; W = Win; D = Draw; L = Loss

==== Matches ====
The league fixtures were announced on 30 June 2021.

14 August 2021 1	Real Sociedad B	1–0	Leganés	San Sebastián
17:00 CEST (UTC+2)	Karrikaburu 57'	Report		Stadium: Anoeta; Referee: Víctor García Verdura

21 August 2021 2	Lugo	0–0	Real Sociedad B	Lugo
17:00 CEST (UTC+2)		Report		Stadium: Estadio Anxo Carro; Attendance: 1,657; Referee: Raúl Martín González Francés

29 August 2021 3	Real Sociedad B	0–0	Fuenlabrada	San Sebastián
19:30 CEST (UTC+2)		Report		Stadium: Anoeta; Referee: Iosu Galech Apezteguía

4 September 2021 4	Cartagena	1–0	Real Sociedad B	Cartagena
18:15 CEST (UTC+2)	Ortuño 90+3'	Report		Stadium: Estadio Cartagonova; Referee: Iván Caparrós Hernández

11 September 2021 5	Real Sociedad B	2–3	Eibar	San Sebastián
16:00 CEST (UTC+2)	Karrikaburu 73'; Alkain 85'	Report		Stadium: Anoeta; Referee: Juan Luis Pulido Santana

18 September 2021 6	Zaragoza	1–1	Real Sociedad B	Zaragoza
18:15 CEST (UTC+2)				Stadium: La Romareda

24 September 2021 7	Real Sociedad B	0–2	Huesca	San Sebastián
20:00 CEST (UTC+2)		Report	Pitta 17', 90'	Stadium: Anoeta; Attendance: 3,171; Referee: José López Toca

2 October 2021 8	Alcorcón	1–4	Real Sociedad B	Alcorcón
21:00 CEST (UTC+2)	Gorosito 34'	Report	Olasagasti 3'; Karrikaburu 45+2'; Alkain 52', 62'	Stadium: Estadio Municipal; Attendance: 1,357; Referee: Rafael Sánchez López

10 October 2021 9	Real Sociedad B	1–1	Ponferradina	Eibar
14:00 CEST (UTC+2)	Alkain 63'	Report	Ojeda 53'	Stadium: Ipurua Municipal Stadium; Attendance: 972; Referee: Alejandro Quintero González

17 October 2021 10	Real Sociedad B	1–1	Real Oviedo	San Sebastián
18:45 CEST (UTC+2)	Olasagasti 57'; Arambarri (yellow card) 77'	Report	Baston 65'; Suárez (yellow card) 90'	Stadium: Anoeta; Attendance: 3,028; Referee: Raúl Martín González Francés

21 October 2021 11	Almería	3–1	Real Sociedad B	Almería
18:45 CEST (UTC+2)	Lazo 4'; Sadiq 75'; Pozo 87'	Report	Jon Magunazelaia 20'	Stadium: Estadio de los Juegos Mediterráneos; Attendance: 7,697; Referee: Javier Iglesias Villanueva

24 October 2021 12	Amorebieta	1–2	Real Sociedad B	Lezama
14:00 CEST (UTC+2)	Orozco (yellow card) 78'; Amorrortu 90+2'	Report	Karrikaburu 45+1'; Alkain (yellow card) 52'; González (yellow card) 59'; Alkain 83'	Stadium: Lezama Facilities; Attendance: 996; Referee: Daniel Jesús Trujillo Suárez

29 October 2021 13	Real Sociedad B	0–1	Las Palmas	San Sebastián
21:00 CEST (UTC+2)	Karrikaburu (yellow card) 78'	Report	Jesé 35'; González (yellow card) 80'	Stadium: Anoeta; Attendance: 2,320; Referee: Dámaso Arcediano Monescillo

4 November 2021 14	Málaga	2–1	Real Sociedad B	Málaga
21:15 CET (UTC+2)	Fernández 9'; Paulino 29'; Rodríguez (yellow card) 69'	Report	Sangalli 7'; Pokorný (yellow card) 53'; Aldasoro (yellow card) 71'	Stadium: La Rosaleda; Attendance: 12,130; Referee: Oliver De La Fuente

7 November 2021 15	Real Sociedad B	0–1	Ibiza	San Sebastián
21:00 CET (UTC+2)	Romero (yellow card) 89'; Pokorný (yellow card) 90+1'	Report	Villar 85'; Guerrero (red card) 90+1'	Stadium: Anoeta; Attendance: 845; Referee: Iosu Galech Apezteguía

12 November 2021 16	Sporting Gijón	0–1	Real Sociedad B	Gijón
21:00 CET (UTC+2)	Babin (yellow card) 35'; Villalba (yellow card) 90+2'	Report	Olasagasti 63'; Sangalli (yellow card) 80'	Stadium: El Molinón; Attendance: 12,452; Referee: Raúl Martín González Francés

22 November 2021 17	Real Sociedad B	1–2	Girona	San Sebastián
19:00 CET (UTC+2)	Olasagasti (yellow card) 55'; López 83' (pen.)	Report	Ayesa 19' (o.g.); Baena (yellow card) 60'; Bueno (yellow card) 66'; García (yellow card) 68'; Bernardo 75'; Juanpe (yellow card) 82'	Stadium: Anoeta; Attendance: 1,898; Referee: Francisco Hernández

28 November 2021 18	Tenerife	2–0	Real Sociedad B	Santa Cruz de Tenerife
18:15 CET (UTC+2)	Enric (yellow card) 9'; Enric (yellow card) 17'; Soriano (yellow card) 37'; Michel 87'	Report	Blasco (yellow card) 61'; Pokorný (yellow card) 70'; López (yellow card) 90+1'; Rodríguez (yellow card) 90+4'	Stadium: Heliodoro Rodríguez López; Attendance: 9,850; Referee: José López

5 December 2021 19	Real Sociedad B	0–1	Burgos	San Sebastián
18:15 CET (UTC+2)	Pokorný (yellow card) 59'; Karrikaburu (yellow card) 90'	Report	Gómez 37'; Grego (yellow card) 90+4'	Stadium: Anoeta; Attendance: 3,586; Referee: Alejandro Quintero

13 December 2021 20	Mirandés	2–0	Real Sociedad B	Miranda de Ebro
21:00 CET (UTC+2)	Camello 68'; Brugué 89'	Report	Lobete (yellow card) 54'	Stadium: Estadio Municipal de Anduva; Attendance: 2,170; Referee: Alejandro Hernández

19 December 2021 21	Real Sociedad B	0–2	Real Valladolid	San Sebastián
18:15 CET (UTC+2)	Pacheco (yellow card) 12'; Valera (yellow card) 90+6'	Report	Sánchez (yellow card) 37'; Weissman 61'; Pérez 90+6'	Stadium: Anoeta; Attendance: 2,582; Referee: Juan Pulido

31 December 2021 22	Eibar	3–2	Real Sociedad B	Eibar
16:15 CET (UTC+2)	Blanco 2' (yellow card) 52'; Blasco 31' (o.g.); Muñoz (yellow card) 66'; Stoichkov (yellow card) 70'; Expósito 89'	Report	Blasco (yellow card) 30' (goal) 81'; Magunazelaia 59'	Stadium: Ipurua Municipal Stadium; Attendance: 4,105; Referee: Oliver De La Fuent

8 January 2022 23	Leganés	1–1	Real Sociedad B	Leganés
21:00 CET (UTC+2)	Bautista (yellow card) 31'; Bustinza (yellow card) 41'; Ranđelović 60'	Report	Arambarri (yellow card) 10'; Olasagasti 49'; Karrikaburu (yellow card) 65'	Stadium: Estadio Municipal de Butarque; Attendance: 4,828; Referee: Saúl Ais

24 January 2022 24	Real Sociedad B	1–2	Cartagena	San Sebastián
21:00 CET (UTC+2)	López 53'; Martín (yellow card) 56'	Report	Alcalá (yellow card) 44'; Castro 49'; Dauda 83'	Stadium: Anoeta; Attendance: 985; Referee: Álvaro Moreno

30 January 2022 25	Las Palmas	0–0	Real Sociedad B	Las Palmas
18:15 CET (UTC+2)	Cardona (yellow card) 85'	Report	Turrientes (yellow card) 41'; Clemente (yellow card) 69'; Magunazelaia (yellow card) 76'; Gabilondo (yellow card) 78'	Stadium: Estadio Gran Canaria; Attendance: 11,030; Referee: Alejandro Quintero

5 February 2022 26	Real Sociedad B	1–1	Lugo	San Sebastián
16:00 CET (UTC+2)	Clemente (yellow card) 28'; Olasagati (yellow card) 55'; Karrikaburu 72'	Report	Barreiro 31' (pen.); Sánchez (yellow card) 42'; Ramos (yellow card) 85'	Stadium: Anoeta; Attendance: 5,356; Referee: Daniel Trujillo

14 February 2022 27	Ponferradina	3–2	Real Sociedad B	Ponferrada
21:00 CET (UTC+2)	Morán 30'; Abedzadeh (yellow card) 61'; Yuri 72' (pen.); Espiau 90+3' (yellow card) 90+3'	Report	Karrikaburu 62'; Clemente (yellow card) 71'; Lobete 80'	Stadium: Estadio El Toralín; Attendance: 3,300; Referee: Víctor Garcia

19 February 2022 28	Real Sociedad B	2–0	Málaga	San Sebastián
21:00 CET (UTC+2)	Alkain (yellow card) 8'; Karrikaburu 35'; López 52' (yellow card) 80'; Zubiaurre (yellow card) 89'	Report	Lombán (yellow card) 90'	Stadium: Anoeta; Attendance: 4,461; Referee: José López Toca

26 February 2022 29	Real Oviedo	0–1	Real Sociedad B	Oviedo
18:15 CET (UTC+2)	Isaac (yellow card) 16' (yellow-red card) 86'; Montiel (yellow card) 61'	Report	González (yellow card) 58'; Alkain (yellow card) 79'; Turrientes (yellow card) 85'; Valera 87' (pen.)	Stadium: Estadio Carlos Tartiere; Attendance: 10,486; Referee: Luis Milla Alvéndiz

7 March 2022 30	Real Sociedad B	2–1	Sporting Gijón	San Sebastián
21:00 CET (UTC+2)	Alkain (yellow card) 25'; Karrikaburu 44', 90+6' (pen.); Sola (yellow card) 66'; Clemente (yellow card) 68'	Report	Đurđević 61', (yellow card) 77'; Milovanov (yellow card) 74'; Ramírez (yellow card) 90+4'; Mariño (yellow card) 90+5'	Stadium: Anoeta; Attendance: 3,032; Referee: Oliver De La Fuente

13 March 2022 31	Burgos CF	0–0	Real Sociedad B	Burgos
14:00 CET (UTC+2)	Elgezabal (yellow card) 16'; García (yellow card) 47'; Gómez (yellow card) 60'	Report		Stadium: Estadio El Plantío; Attendance: 8,078; Referee: Alejandro Quintero

19 March 2022 32	Real Sociedad B	1–3	Mirandés	San Sebastián
14:00 CET (UTC+2)	Karrikaburu 23', (yellow card) 82'; Clemente (yellow card) 27'; Romero (yellow card) 90+5'; Zárate (yellow card) 90+6'	Report	Martín (yellow card) 19'; Sáenz (yellow card) 22'; Brugué 50'; Riquelme 78'; Meseguer 82', (yellow card) 90+5'; Garrido (yellow card) 90'; Marqués (yellow card) 90+5'	Stadium: Anoeta; Attendance: 8,531; Referee: Gálvez Rascon

26 March 2022 33	Ibiza	2–2	Real Sociedad B	Ibiza
14:00 CET (UTC+2)	Herrera 41'; Jiménez (yellow card) 55'; González (yellow card) 62'; Parreño (yellow card) 75'; Goldar (yellow card) 90+3'; Nono (yellow card) 90+3'	Report	Martín 3', 90+1'	Stadium: Estadi Can Misses; Attendance: 2,544; Referee: Arcediano Monescillo

2 April 2022 34	Real Sociedad B	2–4	Alcorcón	San Sebastián
16:00 CEST (UTC+2)	Alkain 5', 18'; Karrikaburu (penalty missed) 10'; Sola (yellow card) 28' (yellow-red card) 40'; Zubiaurre (red card) 30'	Report	Xisco 11', 41'; Borja 53'; Zarfino 63', (yellow card) 67'	Stadium: Anoeta; Attendance: 6,866; Referee: Luis Alvendiz

9 April 2022 35	Real Sociedad B	1–2	Tenerife	San Sebastián
16:00 CEST (UTC+2)	Olasagasti (yellow card) 68'; Navarro 81'	Report	González 10'; Bermejo (yellow card) 29'; Elady 86'	Stadium: Anoeta; Attendance: 4,941; Referee: Rubén Ávalos

18 April 2022 36	Girona	2–0	Real Sociedad B	Girona
19:00 CEST (UTC+2)	Stuani 63'; Bustos 84'	Report	Clemente (yellow card) 38'; Sola (yellow card) 53'; Gómez (yellow card) 77'	Stadium: Estadi Montilivi; Attendance: 7,432; Referee: Oliver De La Fuente

23 April 2022 37	Real Sociedad B	2–1	Amorebieta	San Sebastián
14:00 CEST (UTC+2)	Arambarri (yellow card) 20'; Sola 38'; López 45+1'	Report	Irazabal (yellow card) 4'; Guruzeta (penalty missed) 21', 53'; Santamaría (yellow card) 45'; Gil (yellow card) 90+5'	Stadium: Anoeta; Attendance: 3,038; Referee: Raúl Frances

2 May 2022 38	Real Valladolid	1–2	Real Sociedad B	Valladolid
21:00 CEST (UTC+2)	Sánchez 86'; Plata (yellow card) 90+2'	Report	Blasco (yellow card) 18'; El Yamiq 60', 77' (o.g.); Aldasoro (yellow card) 68'; Olasagati (yellow card) 80'	Stadium: Estadio José Zorrilla; Attendance: 14,326; Referee: Gálvez Rascon

7 May 2022 39	Fuenlabrada	1–2	Real Sociedad B	Fuenlabrada
16:00 CEST (UTC+2)	Tachi (yellow card) 39'; Bouldini 45', (yellow card) 85' (yellow-red card) 87'; Gozzi (yellow card) 75'; Iribas (yellow card) 87'; Zozulya (yellow card) 90'	Report	Alkain 63'; Martín (yellow card) 76'; Turrientes (yellow card) 83'; Sola 90+5'	Stadium: Estadio Fernando Torres; Attendance: 1,230; Referee: José Toca López

13 May 2022 40	Real Sociedad B	0–2	Almería	San Sebastián
21:00 CEST (UTC+2)	Arambarri (yellow card) 19'; Zubiaurre (yellow card) 58'; Turrientes (yellow card) 70'; Lobete (yellow card) 82'; Sola (yellow card) 90'	Report	Ely (yellow card) 17', (goal) 28'; Appiah (yellow card) 45+2'; Portillo (penalty missed) 59'; Lazo 68'	Stadium: Anoeta; Attendance: 8,140; Referee: Iván Caparrós

21 May 2022 41	Huesca	3–2	Real Sociedad B	Huesca
20:00 CEST (UTC+2)	Seoane 17'; Andrei 45+3', (yellow card) 50'; Gaich (yellow card) 57'; Juan Carlos 90+3'	Report	Karrikaburu 53'; Alkain 79'; Aldasoro (yellow card) 81'	Stadium: Estadio El Alcoraz; Attendance: 3,811; Referee: Alejandro Quintero González

27 May 2022 42	Real Sociedad B	1–2	Real Zaragoza	San Sebastián
21:00 CEST (UTC+2)	Aldasoro (yellow card) 10'; Martín 66'; Sola (yellow card) 82'	Report	Ivan 1'; Vada 41'	Stadium: Anoeta; Attendance: 2,622; Referee: Rafael Sánchez López
