= List of Spanish football transfers summer 2022 =

This is a list of Spanish football transfers for the summer sale prior to the 2022–23 season of La Liga and Segunda División. Only moves from La Liga and Segunda División are listed.

== La Liga ==
=== Almería ===
==== In ====
Date	Player	From	Type	Fee	Ref
5 June 2022	(Serbia) Srđan Babić	(Serbia) Red Star Belgrade	Buyout clause	Undisclosed	
6 June 2022	(Spain) Alejandro Pozo	Sevilla	Buyout clause	Undisclosed	
23 June 2022	(Portugal) Gui Guedes	(Portugal) Vitória de Guimarães	Transfer	Undisclosed	
30 June 2022	(Serbia) Dragan Rosić	Albacete	Loan return		
6 July 2022	(France) Houboulang Mendes	(France) Lorient	Transfer	Undisclosed	
7 July 2022	(Slovakia) Martin Šviderský	(England) Manchester United	Transfer	Free	
11 July 2022	(Brazil) Kaiky	(Brazil) Santos	Transfer	€7m	
11 July 2022	(Serbia) Marko Milovanović	(Serbia) Partizan	Transfer	Undisclosed	
10 August 2022	(Spain) Fernando Pacheco	Alavés	Transfer	Undisclosed	
11 August 2022	(Brazil) Léo Baptistão	(Brazil) Santos	Transfer	Undisclosed	
24 August 2022	(Spain) Adri Embarba	Espanyol	Transfer	Undisclosed	
1 September 2022	(Brazil) Lázaro	(Brazil) Flamengo	Transfer	Undisclosed	
1 September 2022	(Spain) Gonzalo Melero	Levante	Transfer	Undisclosed	
1 September 2022	(Mali) El Bilal Touré	(France) Reims	Transfer	Undisclosed	

==== Out ====
Date	Player	To	Type	Fee	Ref
1 July 2022	(Spain) Aitor Buñuel	Released			
1 July 2022	(Georgia (country)) Giorgi Makaridze	Released			
1 July 2022	(Portugal) Nélson Monte	(Ukraine) Dnipro-1	Loan return		
17 July 2022	(Spain) Javi Robles	Fuenlabrada	Loan		
19 July 2022	(Portugal) Daniel Carriço	Released			
22 July 2022	(Spain) Juan Villar	Huesca	Transfer	Free	
11 August 2022	(Serbia) Nikola Maraš	Alavés	Loan		
24 August 2022	(Spain) José Carlos Lazo	Espanyol	Transfer	Undisclosed	
30 August 2022	(Serbia) Dragan Rosić	Released			
1 September 2022	(England) Arvin Appiah	Tenerife	Loan		
1 September 2022	(Nigeria) Umar Sadiq	Real Sociedad	Transfer	Undisclosed	
1 September 2022	(Spain) Curro Sánchez	Burgos	Transfer	Free	

=== Athletic Bilbao ===
==== In ====
Date	Player	From	Type	Fee	Ref
3 July 2022	(Spain) Gorka Guruzeta	Amorebieta	Transfer	Undisclosed	
27 August 2022	(Spain) Ander Herrera	(France) Paris Saint-Germain	Loan		

==== Out ====
Date	Player	To	Type	Fee	Ref
4 July 2022	(Spain) Jokin Ezkieta	Released			
7 July 2022	(Spain) Juan Artola	Burgos	Loan		
7 July 2022	(Spain) Iñigo Córdoba	Released			
13 July 2022	(Mali) Youssouf Diarra	Córdoba	Transfer	Undisclosed	
13 July 2022	(Spain) Iñigo Vicente	Released			
14 July 2022	(Spain) Imanol	Eibar	Loan		
14 July 2022	(Spain) Beñat Prados	Mirandés	Loan		
20 July 2022	(Spain) Unai Núñez	Celta Vigo	Loan		
10 August 2022	(Spain) Álex Petxarroman	Andorra	Loan		
11 August 2022	(Spain) Nico Serrano	Mirandés	Loan		
26 August 2022	(Spain) Peru Nolaskoain	Eibar	Loan		

=== In ===
Date	Player	From	Type	Fee	Ref.
1 July 2022	(Spain) Álvaro Morata	(Italy) Juventus	Loan return		
1 July 2022	(Croatia) Ivo Grbić	(France) Lille	Loan return		
1 July 2022	(Colombia) Santiago Arias	(Spain) Granada	Loan Return		
6 July 2022	(Belgium) Axel Witsel	(Germany) Borussia Dortmund	Transfer	Free	
8 July 2022	(Brazil) Samuel Lino	(Portugal) Gil Vicente	Transfer	€6.5M	
28 July 2022	(Argentina) Nahuel Molina	(Italy) Udinese	Transfer	€10M	
30 August 2022	(Spain) Sergio Reguilón	(England) Tottenham Hotspur	Loan		

=== Out ===
Date	Player	To	Type	Fee	Ref.
30 June 2022	(France) Benjamin Lecomte	(France) Monaco	End of loan		
1 July 2022	(Uruguay) Luis Suárez	(Uruguay) Nacional	Released		
2 July 2022	(Croatia) Šime Vrsaljko	(Greece) Olympiacos	Released		
4 July 2022	(Argentina) Giuliano Simeone	(Spain) Zaragoza	Loan		
7 July 2022	(Mexico) Héctor Herrera	(United States) Houston Dynamo	Released		
21 July 2022	(Spain) Vitolo	Las Palmas	Loan		
27 July 2022	(Spain) Manu Sánchez	Osasuna	Loan		
28 July 2022	(Brazil) Samuel Lino	Valencia	Loan		
29 July 2022	(Argentina) Nehuén Pérez	(Italy) Udinese	Transfer	Undisclosed	
1 August 2022	(Spain) Rodrigo Riquelme	Girona	Loan		
3 August 2022	(Spain) Sergio Camello	Rayo Vallecano	Loan		
12 August 2022	(Denmark) Daniel Wass	(Denmark) Brøndby	Transfer	€1.5M	
25 August 2022	(Spain) Germán Valera	Andorra	Loan		
29 August 2022	(Brazil) Renan Lodi	(England) Nottingham Forest	Loan		
1 September 2022	(Portugal) Marcos Paulo	Mirandés	Loan		

=== Barcelona ===
==== In ====
Date	Player	From	Type	Fee	Ref
4 July 2022	(Denmark) Andreas Christensen	(England) Chelsea	Transfer	Free	
4 July 2022	(Ivory Coast) Franck Kessié	(Italy) Milan	Transfer	Free	
15 July 2022	(Brazil) Raphinha	(England) Leeds United	Transfer	£55m	
19 July 2022	(Poland) Robert Lewandowski	(Germany) Bayern Munich	Transfer	£45m	
29 July 2022	(France) Jules Koundé	(Spain) Sevilla	Transfer	£50m	
1 September 2022	(Spain) Héctor Bellerín	(England) Arsenal	Transfer	Free	
2 September 2022	(Spain) Marcos Alonso	(England) Chelsea	Transfer	Free	

==== Out ====
Date	Player	To	Type	Fee	Ref
12 May 2022	(Brazil) Philippe Coutinho	(England) Aston Villa	Buyout clause	£17m	
1 July 2022	(Brazil) Dani Alves	Released			
1 July 2022	(Spain) Ferran Jutglà	(Belgium) Club Brugge	Transfer	Undisclosed	
8 July 2022	(France) Clément Lenglet	(England) Tottenham Hotspur	Loan		
12 July 2022	(Albania) Rey Manaj	(England) Watford	Transfer	Undisclosed	
13 July 2022	(Portugal) Francisco Trincão	(Portugal) Sporting CP	Loan		
19 July 2022	(Senegal) Moussa Wagué	(Croatia) Gorica	Transfer	Undisclosed	
30 July 2022	(Spain) Óscar Mingueza	(Spain) Celta Vigo	Transfer	Undisclosed	
4 August 2022	(Spain) Riqui Puig	(United States) LA Galaxy	Transfer	Undisclosed	
7 August 2022	(Brazil) Neto	(England) Bournemouth	Transfer	Free	
13 August 2022	(Spain) Nico González	Valencia	Loan		
15 August 2022	(Spain) Álex Collado	Elche	Loan		
25 August 2022	(France) Samuel Umtiti	(Italy) Lecce	Loan		
30 August 2022	(Spain) Mika Mármol	Andorra	Transfer	Undisclosed	
1 September 2022	(Gabon) Pierre-Emerick Aubameyang	(England) Chelsea	Transfer	£12m	
1 September 2022	(Denmark) Martin Braithwaite	Espanyol	Transfer	Free	
1 September 2022	(United States) Sergiño Dest	(Italy) Milan	Loan		
1 September 2022	(Morocco) Abde Ezzalzouli	Osasuna	Loan		
1 September 2022	(Bosnia and Herzegovina) Miralem Pjanić	(United Arab Emirates) Sharjah	Transfer	Free	

=== Betis ===
==== In ====
Date	Player	From	Type	Fee	Ref
3 June 2022	(Brazil) Willian José	Real Sociedad	Buyout clause	€8.5m	
1 July 2022	(Brazil) Luiz Henrique	(Brazil) Fluminense	Transfer	€13M	
4 July 2022	(Italy) Luiz Felipe	(Italy) Lazio	Transfer	Undisclosed	

==== Out ====
Date	Player	To	Type	Fee	Ref
29 July 2022	(Mexico) Diego Lainez	(Portugal) Braga	Loan		
9 August 2022	(Spain) Joel Robles	(England) Leeds United	Transfer	Free	
14 August 2022	(Spain) Marc Bartra	(Turkey) Trabzonspor	Transfer	€1.25m	
26 August 2022	(Spain) Cristian Tello	(United States) Los Angeles FC	Transfer	Free	
1 September 2022	(Spain) Rober	Alavés	Loan		

=== Cádiz ===
==== In ====
Date	Player	From	Type	Fee	Ref
1 July 2022	(Australia) Awer Mabil	(Denmark) Midtjylland	Buyout clause	Undisclosed	
6 July 2022	(Spain) Víctor Chust	Real Madrid	Transfer	Undisclosed	
11 July 2022	(Spain) Joseba Zaldúa	Real Sociedad	Transfer	Undisclosed	
7 August 2022	(Spain) Fede San Emeterio	Real Valladolid	Transfer	Undisclosed	
18 August 2022	(Spain) Antonio Blanco	Real Madrid	Loan		
26 August 2022	(Democratic Republic of the Congo) Théo Bongonda	(Belgium) Genk	Transfer	Undisclosed	
28 August 2022	(Uruguay) Brian Ocampo	(Uruguay) Nacional	Transfer	Undisclosed	

==== Out ====
Date	Player	To	Type	Fee	Ref
1 July 2022	(Spain) Salvi	Rayo Vallecano	Transfer	Free	
4 July 2022	(Armenia) Varazdat Haroyan	(Cyprus) Anorthosis Famagusta	Transfer	Free	
7 July 2022	(Argentina) Juan Flere	Algeciras	Loan		
9 July 2022	(Spain) Manu Nieto	Andorra	Transfer	Undisclosed	
20 July 2022	(Spain) Álvaro Jiménez	Las Palmas	Loan		
4 August 2022	(Spain) Raúl Parra	Mirandés	Loan		
10 August 2022	(Montenegro) Milutin Osmajić	(Portugal) Vizela	Loan		
31 August 2022	(Spain) Martín Calderón	Celta Vigo B	Loan		
1 September 2022	(Spain) Iván Chapela	Unionistas de Salamanca	Loan		
1 September 2022	(Spain) Alberto Perea	Granada	Transfer	Free	
1 September 2022	(Spain) Jorge Pombo	Racing Santander	Transfer	Free	

=== Celta Vigo ===
==== In ====
Date	Player	From	Type	Fee	Ref
1 July 2022	(Sweden) Williot Swedberg	(Sweden) Hammarby	Transfer	€4,7M	
8 July 2022	(United States) Luca de la Torre	(Netherlands) Heracles Almelo	Transfer	€1,9M	
8 July 2022	(Spain) Óscar Rodríguez	Sevilla	Loan	Free	
20 July 2022	(Spain) Unai Núñez	Athletic Bilbao	Loan		
26 July 2022	(Spain) Julen Lobete	Real Sociedad	Transfer	Undisclosed	
30 July 2022	(Spain) Óscar Mingueza	Barcelona	Transfer	Undisclosed	
2 August 2022	(Argentina) Agustín Marchesín	(Portugal) Porto	Transfer	Undisclosed	
6 August 2022	(Portugal) Gonçalo Paciência	(Germany) Eintracht Frankfurt	Transfer	Undisclosed	
8 August 2022	(Spain) Carles Pérez	(Italy) Roma	Loan		
1 September 2022	(Norway) Jørgen Strand Larsen	(Netherlands) Groningen	Transfer	Undisclosed	

==== Out ====
Date	Player	To	Type	Fee	Ref
1 July 2022	(Spain) Alfon	Racing Santander	Loan		
1 July 2022	(Mexico) Néstor Araujo	(Mexico) América	Transfer	Undisclosed fee	
1 July 2022	(Uruguay) Gabriel Fernández	(Mexico) Juárez	Loan extension		
1 July 2022	(Spain) José Fontán	(Netherlands) Go Ahead Eagles	Loan		
1 July 2022	(Scotland) Jordan Holsgrove	(Portugal) Paços de Ferreira	Transfer	Undisclosed fee	
1 July 2022	(Turkey) Emre Mor	Released			
1 July 2022	(Turkey) Okay Yokuşlu	(England) West Bromwich Albion	Transfer	Free	
6 July 2022	(Spain) Brais Méndez	Real Sociedad	Transfer	Undisclosed	
15 July 2022	(Mexico) Orbelín Pineda	(Greece) AEK Athens	Loan		
20 July 2022	(Spain) Rubén Blanco	(France) Marseille	Loan		
28 July 2022	(Spain) Julen Lobete	(Netherlands) RKC Waalwijk	Loan		
5 August 2022	(Spain) Sergio Carreira	Villarreal B	Loan		
23 August 2022	(Spain) Santi Mina	(Saudi Arabia) Al Shabab	Loan		
31 August 2022	(Spain) Miguel Baeza	(Portugal) Rio Ave	Loan		
5 September 2022	(Spain) Nolito	Ibiza	Transfer	Free	

=== Elche ===
==== In ====
Date	Player	From	Type	Fee	Ref
1 June 2022	(Argentina) Ezequiel Ponce	(Russia) Spartak Moscow	Buyout clause	Undisclosed	
21 July 2022	(Spain) Carlos Clerc	Levante	Transfer	Free	
4 August 2022	(Spain) Roger Martí	Levante	Transfer	Undisclosed	
8 August 2022	(Argentina) Lautaro Blanco	(Argentina) Rosario Central	Transfer	Undisclosed	
12 August 2022	(Spain) Pol Lirola	(France) Marseille	Loan		
15 August 2022	(Spain) Álex Collado	Barcelona	Loan		
16 August 2022	(Portugal) Domingos Quina	(England) Watford	Loan		
1 September 2022	(Argentina) Federico Fernández	(England) Newcastle United	Transfer	Undisclosed	
1 September 2022	(Argentina) Nicolás Fernández	(Argentina) San Lorenzo	Transfer	Undisclosed	

==== Out ====
Date	Player	To	Type	Fee	Ref
1 July 2022	(Argentina) Iván Marcone	(Argentina) Independiente	Transfer	€1,9M	
30 July 2022	(Spain) José Salinas	Mirandés	Loan		
8 August 2022	(Argentina) Lautaro Blanco	(Argentina) Rosario Central	Loan		
12 August 2022	(Spain) Josema	Leganés	Transfer	Free	
1 September 2022	(Morocco) Mourad Daoudi	Burgos	Loan		
1 September 2022	(Colombia) Johan Mojica	Villarreal	Transfer	Undisclosed	

=== Espanyol ===
==== In ====
Date	Player	From	Type	Fee	Ref
1 July 2022	(Spain) Joselu	Alavés	Transfer	Free	
1 July 2022	(Spain) Pol Lozano	Girona	Loan return		
1 July 2022	(Spain) Brian Oliván	Mallorca	Transfer	Free	
8 July 2022	(Brazil) Vinícius Souza	(Belgium) Lommel	Loan		
13 July 2022	(France) Benjamin Lecomte	(France) Monaco	Loan		
13 July 2022	(Netherlands) Tonny Vilhena	(Russia) Krasnodar	Buyout clause	Undisclosed	
8 August 2022	(Spain) Edu Expósito	Eibar	Transfer	Undisclosed	
22 August 2022	(Spain) Dani Gómez	Levante	Loan		
24 August 2022	(Spain) José Carlos Lazo	Almería	Transfer	Undisclosed	
31 August 2022	(Spain) Álvaro Fernández	Huesca	Loan		
1 September 2022	(Denmark) Martin Braithwaite	Barcelona	Transfer	Free	

==== Out ====
Date	Player	To	Type	Fee	Ref
1 July 2022	(Spain) Diego López	Rayo Vallecano	End of contract		
1 July 2022	(Spain) Álvaro García	Ibiza	Loan		
1 July 2022	(Spain) Víctor Gómez	(Portugal) Braga	Loan		
1 July 2022	(Spain) Óscar Melendo	Granada	Transfer	Free	
1 July 2022	(Spain) Fran Mérida	Released			
1 July 2022	(Spain) Oier Olazábal	Released			
1 July 2022	(Spain) Dídac Vilà	Released			
11 July 2022	(Spain) Miguelón	Oviedo	Loan		
22 July 2022	(Spain) Álvaro Vadillo	Eibar	Loan		
25 July 2022	(Spain) David López	Girona	Transfer	Free	
10 August 2022	(Netherlands) Tonny Vilhena	(Italy) Salernitana	Loan		
11 August 2022	(China) Wu Lei	(China) Shanghai Port	Transfer	Undisclosed	
14 August 2022	(Spain) Jofre Carreras	Mirandés	Loan		
24 August 2022	(Spain) Adri Embarba	Almería	Transfer	Undisclosed	
24 August 2022	(Argentina) Matías Vargas	(China) Shanghai Port	Transfer	€3.5m	
30 August 2022	(Belgium) Landry Dimata	(Netherlands) NEC	Loan		
13 September 2022	(Spain) Raúl de Tomás	Rayo Vallecano	Transfer	Undisclosed	

=== Getafe ===
==== In ====
Date	Player	From	Type	Fee	Ref
1 July 2022	(Spain) Portu	Real Sociedad	Loan		
1 July 2022	(Spain) Jaime Seoane	Huesca	Transfer	Free	
11 July 2022	(Portugal) Domingos Duarte	Granada	Transfer	Undisclosed	
14 July 2022	(Argentina) Fabrizio Angileri	(Argentina) River Plate	Transfer	Undisclosed	
25 July 2022	(Spain) Luis Milla	Granada	Transfer	Undisclosed	
1 August 2022	(Spain) Borja Mayoral	Real Madrid	Transfer	Undisclosed	
10 August 2022	(Spain) Kiko Casilla	(England) Leeds United	Transfer	Free	
19 August 2022	(Paraguay) Omar Alderete	(Germany) Hertha BSC	Loan		
26 August 2022	(Spain) Juanmi Latasa	Real Madrid	Loan		
31 August 2022	(Morocco) Munir El Haddadi	Sevilla	Transfer	Undisclosed	
1 September 2022	(Spain) Jordan Amavi	(France) Marseille	Loan		

==== Out ====
Date	Player	To	Type	Fee	Ref
1 July 2022	(Spain) Hugo Duro	Valencia	Buyout clause	€4m	
1 July 2022	(Uruguay) Mathías Olivera	(Italy) Napoli	Transfer	Undisclosed	
5 July 2022	(Spain) Darío Poveda	Ibiza	Loan		
15 July 2022	(Spain) Rubén Yáñez	Málaga	Transfer	Free	
21 July 2022	(Spain) Chema	Eibar	Transfer	Free	
21 July 2022	(Scotland) Jack Harper	Hércules	Loan		
26 July 2022	(Spain) Miguel Ángel	Granada	Transfer	Undisclosed	
26 July 2022	(Uruguay) Erick Cabaco	Granada	Loan		
26 July 2022	(Spain) Ignasi Miquel	Granada	Transfer	Free	
26 July 2022	(Argentina) Jonathan Silva	Granada	Loan		
8 August 2022	(Ghana) Sabit Abdulai	Ponferradina	Loan		
10 August 2022	(Czech Republic) Jakub Jankto	(Czech Republic) Sparta Prague	Loan		

=== Girona ===
==== In ====
Date	Player	From	Type	Fee	Ref
4 July 2022	(Spain) Iván Marin	Villarreal	Loan extension		
25 July 2022	(Argentina) Valentín Castellanos	(United States) New York City	Loan		
25 July 2022	(Brazil) Yan Couto	(England) Manchester City	Loan		
25 July 2022	(Spain) David López	Espanyol	Transfer	Free	
1 August 2022	(Spain) Rodrigo Riquelme	Atlético Madrid	Loan		
2 August 2022	(Venezuela) Yangel Herrera	(England) Manchester City	Loan		
5 August 2022	(Spain) Miguel Gutiérrez	Real Madrid	Transfer	Undisclosed	
19 August 2022	(Spain) Javi Hernández	Leganés	Loan		
19 August 2022	(Brazil) Reinier	Real Madrid	Loan		
1 September 2022	(Spain) Toni Fuidias	Real Madrid	Transfer	Undisclosed	
1 September 2022	(Argentina) Paulo Gazzaniga	(England) Fulham	Loan		
1 September 2022	(Spain) Oriol Romeu	(England) Southampton	Transfer	Undisclosed	
1 September 2022	(Spain) Manu Vallejo	Valencia	Transfer	Undisclosed	
1 September 2022	(Spain) Toni Villa	Real Valladolid	Transfer	Undisclosed	

==== Out ====
Date	Player	To	Type	Fee	Ref
1 July 2022	(Spain) Álex Baena	Villarreal	Loan return		
1 July 2022	(Argentina) Nahuel Bustos	(England) Manchester City	Loan return		
1 July 2022	(Spain) Jairo Izquierdo	Cartagena	Transfer	Free	
1 July 2022	(Spain) David Juncà	Released			
1 July 2022	(Spain) Pol Lozano	Espanyol	Loan return		
1 July 2022	(Spain) Pablo Moreno	(England) Manchester City	Loan return		
1 July 2022	(Spain) Víctor Sánchez	Released			
1 July 2022	(Argentina) Darío Sarmiento	(England) Manchester City	Loan return		
10 July 2022	(Spain) Jordi Calavera	Lugo	Transfer	Free	
14 July 2022	(Spain) Álex Gallar	Released			
19 July 2022	(Belgium) Jonathan Dubasin	Albacete	Transfer	Undisclosed	
5 August 2022	(Spain) Adrián Ortolá	(Belgium) Deinze	Transfer	Free	
29 August 2022	(Spain) Pau Víctor	Sabadell	Loan		
29 August 2022	(Spain) Álex Sala	Sabadell	Loan		
31 August 2022	(Spain) Eric Monjonell	(Belgium) Lommel	Loan		

=== Mallorca ===
==== In ====
Date	Player	From	Type	Fee	Ref
1 July 2022	(Spain) Pablo Maffeo	(Germany) VfB Stuttgart	Buyout clause	Undisclosed	
1 July 2022	(Spain) José Manuel Copete	Ponferradina	Transfer	Free	
22 July 2022	(Kosovo) Vedat Muriqi	(Italy) Lazio	Transfer	Undisclosed	
22 July 2022	(Serbia) Predrag Rajković	(France) Reims	Transfer	€4.5m	
29 July 2022	(Argentina) Rodrigo Battaglia	(Portugal) Sporting CP	Transfer	Undisclosed	
29 August 2022	(Zimbabwe) Tino Kadewere	(France) Lyon	Loan		
1 September 2022	(Serbia) Matija Nastasić	(Italy) Fiorentina	Transfer	Free	

==== Out ====
Date	Player	To	Type	Fee	Ref
1 July 2022	(Spain) Salva Sevilla	Alavés	Transfer	Free	
1 July 2022	(Spain) Brian Oliván	Espanyol	Transfer	Free	
3 July 2022	(Serbia) Aleksandar Sedlar	Alavés	Transfer	Free	
4 July 2022	(Spain) Aleix Febas	Released			
10 August 2022	(United States) Matthew Hoppe	(England) Middlesbrough	Transfer	Undisclosed	
1 September 2022	(Spain) Álex Alegría	Fuenlabrada	Loan		

=== Osasuna ===
==== In ====
Date	Player	From	Type	Fee	Ref
1 July 2022	(Spain) Rubén Peña	Villarreal	Transfer	Free	
2 July 2022	(Spain) Aitor Fernández	Levante	Transfer	Free	
27 July 2022	(Spain) Manu Sánchez	Atlético Madrid	Loan		
28 July 2022	(Spain) Moi Gómez	Villarreal	Transfer	€1.8m	
1 September 2022	(Morocco) Abde Ezzalzouli	Barcelona	Loan		

==== Out ====
Date	Player	To	Type	Fee	Ref
1 June 2022	(Spain) Oier	(Cyprus) AEK Larnaca	Transfer	Free	
1 June 2022	(Spain) Iñigo Pérez	Released			
1 June 2022	(Angola) Jonás Ramalho	Málaga	Transfer	Free	
7 July 2022	(Spain) Marc Cardona	Las Palmas	Transfer	Free	
31 July 2022	(Spain) Cote	Sporting Gijón	Transfer	Free	
10 August 2022	(Spain) Robert Ibáñez	Levante	Transfer	Free	
23 August 2022	(Spain) Jesús Areso	Burgos	Loan		
1 September 2022	(Spain) Javi Martínez	Albacete	Loan		

=== Rayo Vallecano ===
==== In ====
Date	Player	From	Type	Fee	Ref
1 July 2022	(Spain) Salvi	Cádiz	Transfer	Free	
2 July 2022	(Spain) Diego López	RCD Espanyol	Transfer	Free	
29 July 2022	(France) Florian Lejeune	Alavés	Loan		
3 August 2022	(Spain) Sergio Camello	Atlético Madrid	Loan		
31 August 2022	(Spain) Pep Chavarría	Zaragoza	Transfer	Undisclosed	
1 September 2022	(Ghana) Abdul Mumin	(Portugal) Vitória de Guimarães	Transfer	Undisclosed	
13 September 2022	(Spain) Raúl de Tomás	Espanyol	Transfer	Undisclosed	

==== Out ====
Date	Player	To	Type	Fee	Ref
1 July 2022	(France) Luca Zidane	Eibar	Transfer	Free	
3 July 2022	(Spain) Martín Pascual	Ibiza	Loan		
7 July 2022	(Spain) Jorge Moreno	Córdoba	Loan		
14 July 2022	(Spain) Joni Montiel	Levante	Loan		
30 August 2022	(Spain) Sergio Moreno	Osasuna B	Loan		

=== Real Madrid ===
==== In ====
Date	Player	From	Type	Fee	Ref
1 July 2022	(France) Aurélien Tchouaméni	(France) Monaco	Transfer	€80M	
1 July 2022	(Germany) Antonio Rüdiger	(England) Chelsea	Transfer	Free	

==== Out ====
Date	Player	To	Type	Fee	Ref
1 July 2022	(Wales) Gareth Bale	(United States) Los Angeles	Released		
1 July 2022	(Spain) Isco	Sevilla	Released		
1 July 2022	(Brazil) Marcelo	Released			
6 July 2022	(Spain) Víctor Chust	Cádiz	Transfer	Undisclosed	
8 July 2022	(Serbia) Luka Jović	(Italy) Fiorentina	Transfer	Undisclosed	
12 July 2022	(Spain) Mario Gila	(Italy) Lazio	Transfer	Undisclosed	
18 July 2022	(Spain) Diego Altube	Albacete	Transfer	Undisclosed	
19 July 2022	(Japan) Takefusa Kubo	Real Sociedad	Transfer	Undisclosed	
1 August 2022	(Spain) Borja Mayoral	Getafe	Transfer	Undisclosed	
5 August 2022	(Spain) Miguel Gutiérrez	Girona	Transfer	Undisclosed	
12 August 2022	(Spain) Marvin Park	Las Palmas	Loan		
18 August 2022	(Spain) Antonio Blanco	Cádiz	Loan		
19 August 2022	(Brazil) Casemiro	(England) Manchester United	Transfer	Undisclosed	
19 August 2022	(Brazil) Reinier	Girona	Loan		
26 August 2022	(Spain) Juanmi Latasa	Getafe	Loan		
1 September 2022	(Spain) Toni Fuidias	Girona	Transfer	Undisclosed	

=== Real Sociedad ===
==== In ====
Date	Player	From	Type	Fee	Ref
1 July 2022	(France) Mohamed-Ali Cho	(France) Angers	Transfer	€12m	
6 July 2022	(Spain) Brais Méndez	Celta Vigo	Transfer	€14m	
19 July 2022	(Japan) Takefusa Kubo	Real Madrid	Transfer	Undisclosed	
29 August 2022	(Norway) Alexander Sørloth	(Germany) RB Leipzig	Loan		
1 September 2022	(Nigeria) Umar Sadiq	Almería	Transfer	Undisclosed	

==== Out ====
Date	Player	To	Type	Fee	Ref.
3 June 2022	(Brazil) Willian José	Real Betis	Buyout clause	€8.5m	
1 July 2022	(Spain) Portu	Getafe	Loan		
1 July 2022	(Norway) Alexander Sørloth	(Germany) RB Leipzig	Loan return		
11 July 2022	(Spain) Jon Guridi	Alavés	Transfer	Free	
11 July 2022	(France) Modibo Sagnan	(Netherlands) Utrecht	Loan		
11 July 2022	(Spain) Joseba Zaldúa	Cádiz	Transfer	Free	
22 July 2022	(Spain) Jon Bautista	Eibar	Transfer	Undisclosed	
26 July 2022	(Spain) Julen Lobete	Celta Vigo	Transfer	Undisclosed	
2 August 2022	(France) Naïs Djouahra	(Croatia) Rijeka	Transfer	€750k	
9 August 2022	(Australia) Mathew Ryan	(Denmark) Copenhagen	Transfer	€5m	
26 August 2022	(Sweden) Alexander Isak	(England) Newcastle United	Transfer	Undisclosed	
31 August 2022	(Belgium) Adnan Januzaj	Sevilla	Transfer	Free	

=== Sevilla ===
==== In ====
Date	Player	From	Type	Fee	Ref
11 July 2022	(Brazil) Marcão	(Turkey) Galatasaray	Transfer	€15m	
4 August 2022	(Brazil) Alex Telles	(England) Manchester United	Loan		
8 August 2022	(Spain) Isco	Real Madrid	Transfer	Free	
17 August 2022	(France) Tanguy Nianzou	(Germany) Bayern Munich	Transfer	€16m	
31 August 2022	(Belgium) Adnan Januzaj	Real Sociedad	Transfer	Free	
1 September 2022	(Denmark) Kasper Dolberg	(France) Nice	Loan		

==== Out ====
Date	Player	To	Type	Fee	Ref
1 June 2022	(Brazil) Diego Carlos	(England) Aston Villa	Transfer	£26m	
6 June 2022	(Spain) Alejandro Pozo	Almería	Buyout clause	Undisclosed	
1 July 2022	(France) Anthony Martial	(England) Manchester United	Loan return		
2 July 2022	(Netherlands) Luuk de Jong	(Netherlands) PSV Eindhoven	Transfer	£3.5m	
7 July 2022	(Spain) Javi Díaz	Tenerife	Transfer	Undisclosed	
8 July 2022	(Spain) Óscar Rodríguez	Celta Vigo	Loan		
11 July 2022	(Sweden) Ludwig Augustinsson	(England) Aston Villa	Loan		
11 July 2022	(Spain) Juan Berrocal	Eibar	Transfer	Undisclosed	
27 July 2022	(Morocco) Oussama Idrissi	(Netherlands) Feyenoord	Loan		
29 July 2022	(France) Jules Koundé	Barcelona	Transfer	€50m	
8 August 2022	(Spain) Juanlu Sánchez	Mirandés	Loan		
10 August 2022	(Spain) Antonio Zarzana	(Portugal) Marítimo	Loan		
24 August 2022	(Portugal) Rony Lopes	(France) Troyes	Loan		
31 August 2022	(Morocco) Munir El Haddadi	Getafe	Transfer	Undisclosed	
31 August 2022	(Argentina) Lucas Ocampos	(Netherlands) Ajax	Loan		
31 August 2022	(Spain) Iván Romero	Tenerife	Loan		

=== Valencia ===
==== In ====
Date	Player	From	Type	Fee	Ref
1 July 2022	(Spain) Hugo Duro	Getafe	Buyout clause	€4m	
12 July 2022	(Spain) Samu Castillejo	(Italy) Milan	Transfer	Undisclosed	
28 July 2022	(Brazil) Samuel Lino	Atlético Madrid	Loan		
13 August 2022	(Spain) Nico González	Barcelona	Loan		
25 August 2022	(Portugal) André Almeida	(Portugal) Vitória de Guimarães	Transfer	Undisclosed	
25 August 2022	(Turkey) Cenk Özkacar	(France) Lyon	Loan		
29 August 2022	(Uruguay) Edinson Cavani	(England) Manchester United	Transfer	Free	
1 September 2022	(Netherlands) Justin Kluivert	(Italy) Roma	Loan		
1 September 2022	(Guinea) Ilaix Moriba	(Germany) RB Leipzig	Loan		
26 September 2022	(Spain) Iago Herrerín	(Saudi Arabia) Al Raed	Transfer	Free	

==== Out ====
Date	Player	To	Type	Fee	Ref
1 July 2022	(Russia) Denis Cheryshev	Released			
5 July 2022	(Spain) Jorge Sáenz	Leganés	Loan		
19 July 2022	(Peru) Alessandro Burlamaqui	Badajoz	Loan		
8 August 2022	(Netherlands) Jasper Cillessen	(Netherlands) NEC	Transfer	Undisclosed	
8 August 2022	(Portugal) Gonçalo Guedes	(England) Wolverhampton Wanders	Transfer	€41.5m	
25 August 2022	(New Caledonia) Koba Koindredi	Real Oviedo	Loan		
1 September 2022	(Serbia) Uroš Račić	(Portugal) Braga	Loan		
1 September 2022	(Spain) Carlos Soler	(France) Paris Saint-Germain	Transfer	Undisclosed	
1 September 2022	(Spain) Manu Vallejo	Girona	Transfer	Undisclosed	

=== Valladolid ===
==== In ====
Date	Player	From	Type	Fee	Ref
6 June 2022	(Spain) Monchu	Granada	Transfer	Undisclosed	
1 July 2022	(Spain) Iván Sánchez	(England) Birmingham City	Transfer	€100k	
7 July 2022	(Spain) Sergio Asenjo	Villarreal	Transfer	Free	
11 July 2022	(Ecuador) Gonzalo Plata	(Portugal) Sporting CP	Buyout clause	Undisclosed	
13 July 2022	(Spain) Sergio Escudero	Granada	Transfer	Free	
12 August 2022	(Martinique) Mickaël Malsa	Levante	Transfer	Undisclosed	
24 August 2022	(Morocco) Zouhair Feddal	(Portugal) Sporting CP	Transfer	Free	
1 September 2022	(Brazil) Kenedy	(England) Chelsea	Transfer	Undisclosed	
1 September 2022	(Colombia) Juanjo Narváez	Zaragoza	Transfer	Undisclosed	

==== Out ====
Date	Player	To	Type	Fee	Ref
1 July 2022	(The Gambia) Saidy Janko	(Germany) VfL Bochum	Loan		
1 July 2022	(Spain) Nacho	Released			
5 July 2022	(Spain) Ignasi Vilarrasa	Huesca	Transfer	Free	
13 July 2022	(Spain) Churripi	Burgos	Transfer	Undisclosed	
14 July 2022	(Spain) Diego Alende	(Spain) Andorra	Transfer	Free	
14 July 2022	(Spain) Sergio Ortuño	Eldense	Loan		
15 July 2022	(Spain) Raúl García	Deportivo La Coruña	Loan		
16 July 2022	(Brazil) Paulo Vitor	(Portugal) Rio Ave	Loan		
20 July 2022	(Spain) Kiko	Cartagena	Transfer	Free	
7 August 2022	(Spain) Fede San Emeterio	Cádiz	Transfer	Undisclosed	
12 August 2022	(Spain) Roberto	Released			
29 August 2022	(Senegal) Sekou Gassama	Racing Santander	Loan		
30 August 2022	(Ecuador) Stiven Plaza	(United States) New York Red Bulls	Transfer	Undisclosed	
31 August 2022	(Ghana) Isaac Amoah	Algeciras	Loan		
1 September 2022	(Spain) Apa	Released			
1 September 2022	(Spain) Hugo Vallejo	Ponferradina	Loan		
1 September 2022	(Spain) Toni Villa	Girona	Transfer	Undisclosed	

=== Villarreal ===
==== In ====
Date	Player	From	Type	Fee	Ref
1 July 2022	(Spain) Álex Baena	Girona	Loan return		
1 July 2022	(Spain) José Luis Morales	Levante	Transfer	Free	
8 July 2022	(Spain) Pepe Reina	(Italy) Lazio	Transfer	Free	
28 July 2022	(Spain) Kiko Femenía	(England) Watford	Transfer	Undisclosed	
14 August 2022	(Argentina) Giovani Lo Celso	(England) Tottenham Hotspur	Loan		
1 September 2022	(Colombia) Johan Mojica	Elche	Transfer	Undisclosed	

==== Out ====
Date	Player	To	Type	Fee	Ref
1 July 2022	(Ivory Coast) Serge Aurier	End of contract			
1 July 2022	(Spain) Rubén Peña	Osasuna	Transfer	Free	
4 July 2022	(Spain) Iván Marin	Girona	Loan extension		
4 July 2022	(Spain) Xavi Quintillà	(Portugal) Santa Clara	Transfer	Undisclosed	
7 July 2022	(Spain) Sergio Asenjo	Real Valladolid	Transfer	Free	
8 July 2022	(Spain) Álex Millán	(Portugal) Famalicão	Loan		
28 July 2022	(Spain) Moi Gómez	Osasuna	Transfer	€1.8m	
29 July 2022	(Spain) Mario Gaspar	(England) Watford	Transfer	Free	
29 July 2022	(Spain) Vicente Iborra	Levante	Loan		
16 August 2022	(Ecuador) Pervis Estupiñán	(England) Brighton & Hove Albion	Transfer	Undisclosed	
18 August 2022	(Senegal) Boulaye Dia	(Italy) Salernitana	Loan		
19 August 2022	(Spain) Paco Alcácer	(United Arab Emirates) Sharjah	Transfer	Free	

== Segunda División ==
=== Alavés ===
==== In ====
Date	Player	From	Type	Fee	Ref
1 July 2022	(Argentina) Carlos Benavídez	(Argentina) Independiente	Transfer	Free	
1 July 2022	(Spain) Salva Sevilla	Mallorca	Transfer	Free	
1 July 2022	(Spain) Xeber Alkain	Real Sociedad B	Transfer	Free	
5 July 2022	(Serbia) Aleksandar Sedlar	Mallorca	Transfer	Free	
9 July 2022	(Colombia) Anderson Arroyo	(England) Liverpool	Loan		
11 July 2022	(Spain) Jon Guridi	Real Sociedad	Transfer	Undisclosed	
11 August 2022	(Serbia) Nikola Maraš	Almería	Loan		
1 September 2022	(Spain) Rober	Real Betis	Loan		

==== Out ====
Date	Player	To	Type	Fee	Ref
1 July 2022	(Spain) Martín Aguirregabiria	Released			
1 July 2022	(Sweden) John Guidetti	(Sweden) AIK	Transfer	Free	
1 July 2022	(Spain) Joselu	Espanyol	Transfer	Free	
1 July 2022	(Spain) Édgar Méndez	(Mexico) Necaxa	Transfer	Free	
1 July 2022	(Spain) Ximo Navarro	Released			
1 July 2022	(Spain) Tomás Pina	Released			
1 July 2022	(Spain) Pere Pons	Released			
15 July 2022	(Portugal) João Silva	(Belgium) KV Kortrijk	Transfer	Undisclosed	
18 July 2022	(Spain) Martín Aguirregabiria	(Portugal) Famalicão	Transfer	Free	
28 July 2022	(Spain) Borja Sainz	(Turkey) Giresunspor	Transfer	Undisclosed	
29 July 2022	(Spain) Saúl García	Racing Santander	Transfer	Free	
29 July 2022	(France) Florian Lejeune	Rayo Vallecano	Loan		
4 August 2022	(Spain) Carlos Isaac	(Portugal) Vizela	Transfer	Undisclosed	
5 August 2022	(Spain) Antonio Perera	(Bulgaria) Botev Plovdiv	Transfer	Undisclosed	
8 August 2022	(Georgia (country)) Giorgi Gagua	Real Unión	Loan		
10 August 2022	(Spain) Fernando Pacheco	Almería	Transfer	Undisclosed	
15 August 2022	(Panama) Puma Rodríguez	(Portugal) Famalicão	Transfer	Free	
31 August 2022	(Spain) Tachi	Released			

=== Albacete ===
==== In ====
Date	Player	From	Type	Fee	Ref
7 July 2022	(Spain) Juan María Alcedo	Sevilla Atlético	Transfer	Undisclosed	
18 July 2022	(Spain) Diego Altube	Real Madrid	Transfer	Undisclosed	
19 July 2022	(Belgium) Jonathan Dubasin	Girona	Transfer	Undisclosed	
19 July 2022	(Spain) Álvaro Rodríguez	Burgos	Transfer	Undisclosed	
23 July 2022	(Spain) Juanma	Burgos	Transfer	Undisclosed	
23 July 2022	(Portugal) Tomás Reymão	(Portugal) Boavista	Transfer	Undisclosed	
25 July 2022	(Spain) Maikel Mesa	Las Palmas	Transfer	Free	
25 July 2022	(Spain) Lander Olaetxea	Amorebieta	Transfer	Undisclosed	
25 July 2022	(Spain) Juan Antonio Ros	Lugo	Transfer	Undisclosed	
27 July 2022	(Spain) Higinio	(Bulgaria) Ludogorets Razgrad	Transfer	Undisclosed	
31 August 2022	(Spain) Antonio Glauder	Eibar	Transfer	Undisclosed	
1 September 2022	(Spain) Javi Martínez	Osasuna	Loan		

==== Out ====
Date	Player	To	Type	Fee	Ref
23 June 2022	(Cameroon) Jean Jules	(Poland) Górnik Zabrze	Transfer	Undisclosed	
30 June 2022	(Uruguay) Emiliano Gómez	(Italy) Sassuolo	Loan return		
30 June 2022	(Spain) Alberto Jiménez	Tenerife	Loan return		
30 June 2022	(Spain) Kike Márquez	Released			
30 June 2022	(Venezuela) Yaimil Medina	Released			
30 June 2022	(Serbia) Dragan Rosić	Almería	Loan return		
30 June 2022	(Spain) Jordi Sánchez	Released			
21 July 2022	(Spain) Rafa Gálvez	Released			
29 July 2022	(Spain) Andreu Arasa	Released			
29 July 2022	(Spain) Rubén Cantero	Barcelona Juvenil	Loan		
22 August 2022	(Peru) Jeisson Martínez	Released			
23 August 2022	(Spain) Eric Montes	Gimnàstic Tarragona	Loan		
1 September 2022	(Spain) Sergi García	Sabadell	Loan		

=== Andorra ===
==== In ====
Date	Player	From	Type	Fee	Ref
1 July 2022	(Spain) Marc Aguado	Zaragoza	Loan		
7 July 2022	(Spain) Raúl Lizoain	Mirandés	Transfer	Free	
8 July 2022	(Spain) Diego Pampín	Celta Vigo B	Transfer	Free	
9 July 2022	(Spain) Dani Morer	(Portugal) Famalicão	Loan		
9 July 2022	(Spain) Manu Nieto	Cádiz	Transfer	Undisclosed	
9 July 2022	(Spain) Marc Vidal	Betis Deportivo	Transfer	Free	
14 July 2022	(Spain) Diego Alende	Real Valladolid	Transfer	Free	
21 July 2022	(Spain) Jacobo González	Sabadell	Transfer	Undisclosed	
22 July 2022	(Spain) Jandro Orellana	Barcelona B	Transfer	Free	
10 August 2022	(Spain) Álex Petxarroman	Athletic Bilbao	Loan		
25 August 2022	(Spain) Germán Valera	Atlético Madrid	Loan		
26 August 2022	(Spain) Moha Moukhliss	Real Valladolid Promesas	Transfer	Undisclosed	
30 August 2022	(Spain) Mika Mármol	Barcelona	Transfer	Undisclosed	
1 September 2022	(Greece) Christos Albanis	(Greece) AEK Athens	Loan		
1 September 2022	(Turkey) Sinan Bakış	(Netherlands) Heracles Almelo	Transfer	Undisclosed	
1 September 2022	(Sierra Leone) Mustapha Bundu	(Belgium) Anderlecht	Loan		

==== Out ====
Date	Player	To	Type	Fee	Ref
12 July 2022	(Spain) Eric Cañete	San Cristóbal	Loan		
12 July 2022	(Spain) Alejandro Gutiérrez	Released			
12 July 2022	(Spain) Marc Pedraza	Released			
12 July 2022	(Senegal) Zourdine Thior	Released			
18 July 2022	(Spain) Rubén Enri	Cornellà	Loan		
28 July 2022	(Spain) Diego González	Eldense	Loan		
28 July 2022	(Spain) Eudald Vergés	Sabadell	Loan		
1 August 2022	(Andorra) Albert Rosas	Utebo	Loan		
11 August 2022	(Spain) David Martín	Released			
14 August 2022	(Spain) Manu Nieto	Eldense	Loan		
1 September 2022	(Spain) Josele Martínez	Released			
1 September 2022	(Spain) Roger Riera	Released			
1 September 2022	(Spain) Martí Riverola	Released			

=== Burgos ===
==== In ====
Date	Player	From	Type	Fee	Ref
23 June 2022	(Spain) Borja González	Rayo Majadahonda	Transfer	Undisclosed	
30 June 2022	(France) Loïc Badiashile	Inter de Madrid	Transfer	Free	
30 June 2022	(Spain) Dani Barrio	Málaga	Transfer	Free	
7 July 2022	(Spain) Juan Artola	Athletic Bilbao	Loan		
8 July 2022	(Spain) Miguel Atienza	Eibar	Transfer	Undisclosed	
13 July 2022	(Spain) Churripi	Valladolid	Transfer	Undisclosed	
21 July 2022	(Spain) Álex Bermejo	Tenerife	Transfer	Free	
18 August 2022	(Spain) Gaspar Campos	Sporting Gijón	Loan		
23 August 2022	(Spain) Jesús Areso	Osasuna	Loan		
30 August 2022	(Spain) Javi Pérez	Ibiza	Transfer	Free	
1 September 2022	(Morocco) Mourad Daoudi	Elche	Loan		
1 September 2022	(Spain) Juan Hernández	Ponferradina	Transfer	Free	
3 September 2022	(Spain) Curro Sánchez	Almería	Transfer	Free	

==== Out ====
Date	Player	To	Type	Fee	Ref
1 July 2022	(Spain) Eneko Undabarrena	Intercity	Transfer	Free	
19 July 2022	(Spain) Álvaro Rodríguez	Albacete	Transfer	Undisclosed	
23 July 2022	(Spain) Juanma	Albacete	Transfer	Undisclosed	
26 July 2022	(Serbia) Filip Malbašić	Released			
23 August 2022	(Spain) Iván Serrano	Linares	Loan		

=== Cartagena ===
==== In ====
Date	Player	From	Type	Fee	Ref
1 July 2022	(Spain) Óscar Arribas	Alcorcón	Transfer	Free	
1 July 2022	(Spain) Mikel Rico	Huesca	Transfer	Free	
1 July 2022	(Spain) Luca Sangalli	Real Sociedad B	Transfer	Free	
2 July 2022	(Spain) Aarón Escandell	Granada	Transfer	Free	
3 July 2022	(Spain) Iván Calero	Málaga	Transfer	Free	
4 July 2022	(Spain) David Ferreiro	Huesca	Transfer	Free	
7 July 2022	(Spain) Borja Valle	Alcorcón	Transfer	Free	
8 July 2022	(Spain) Jairo Izquierdo	Girona	Transfer	Free	
17 July 2022	(Albania) Armando Sadiku	Las Palmas	Transfer	Free	
20 July 2022	(Spain) Kiko	Valladolid	Transfer	Free	
25 July 2022	(Argentina) Damián Musto	(Argentina) Peñarol	Transfer	Free	
28 July 2022	(Argentina) Franchu	Eibar	Loan		
1 August 2022	(Sweden) Isak Jansson	(Sweden) Kalmar	Transfer	Undisclosed	
19 August 2022	(Venezuela) Jeriel De Santis	(Portugal) Boavista	Loan		
1 September 2022	(South Korea) Lee Sang-hyeok	(Czech Republic) Pardubice	Transfer	Free	
28 September 2022	(Spain) Jaime Romero	(Azerbaijan) Qarabağ	Transfer	Free	

==== Out ====
Date	Player	To	Type	Fee	Ref
21 June 2022	(France) Yann Bodiger	Granada	Transfer	Free	
19 July 2022	(Spain) Antonio Luna	Released			

=== Eibar ===
==== In ====
Date	Player	From	Type	Fee	Ref
1 July 2022	(Spain) Ríos Reina	Ponferradina	Transfer	Free	
11 July 2022	(Spain) Juan Berrocal	Sevilla	Transfer	Undisclosed	
12 July 2022	(Brazil) Matheus Pereira	Barcelona B	Transfer	Undisclosed	
14 July 2022	(Spain) Imanon García	Athletic Bilbao	Loan		
21 July 2022	(Spain) Chema	Getafe	Transfer	Free	
22 July 2022	(Spain) Jon Bautista	Real Sociedad	Transfer	Undisclosed	
22 July 2022	(Spain) Álvaro Vadillo	Espanyol	Loan		
16 August 2022	(Argentina) Blanco Leschuk	(Turkey) Antalyaspor	Transfer	Undisclosed	
26 August 2022	(Spain) Peru Nolaskoain	Athletic Bilbao	Loan		
1 September 2022	(France) Luca Zidane	Rayo Vallecano	Transfer	Free	

==== Out ====
Date	Player	To	Type	Fee	Ref
8 July 2022	(Spain) Miguel Atienza	Burgos	Transfer	Undisclosed	
28 July 2022	(Argentina) Franchu	Cartagena	Loan		
5 August 2022	(Spain) Óscar Sielva	Huesca	Loan		
8 August 2022	(Spain) Edu Expósito	Espanyol	Transfer	Undisclosed	
17 August 2022	(Spain) Sergio Cubero	Fuenlabrada	Loan		
31 August 2022	(Spain) Antonio Glauder	Albacete	Transfer	Undisclosed	

=== Granada ===
==== In ====
Date	Player	From	Type	Fee	Ref
21 June 2022	(France) Yann Bodiger	Cartagena	Transfer	Free	
18 July 2022	(Spain) Raúl Fernández	Las Palmas	Transfer	Free	
20 July 2022	(Portugal) André Ferreira	(Portugal) Paços de Ferreira	Transfer	Undisclosed	
25 July 2022	(Spain) José Callejón	(Italy) Fiorentina	Transfer	Free	
26 July 2022	(Spain) Miguel Ángel	Getafe	Transfer	Undisclosed	
26 July 2022	(Uruguay) Erick Cabaco	Getafe	Loan		
26 July 2022	(Spain) Ignasi Miquel	Getafe	Transfer	Free	
26 July 2022	(Argentina) Jonathan Silva	Getafe	Loan		
6 August 2022	(Spain) Óscar Melendo	Espanyol	Transfer	Free	
9 August 2022	(Spain) Sergio Ruiz	(United States) Charlotte FC	Transfer	Undisclosed	
10 August 2022	(Spain) Víctor Meseguer	Mirandés	Transfer	Undisclosed	
1 September 2022	(Spain) Alberto Perea	Cádiz	Transfer	Free	

==== Out ====
Date	Player	To	Type	Fee	Ref
6 June 2022	(Spain) Monchu	Real Valladolid	Transfer	Undisclosed	
1 July 2022	(France) Maxime Gonalons	(France) Clermont Foot	Transfer	Free	
1 July 2022	(Spain) Dani Raba	Leganés	Transfer	Free	
1 July 2022	(Spain) Germán Sánchez	Released			
1 July 2022	(Venezuela) Darwin Machís	(Mexico) Juárez	Transfer	Free	
2 July 2022	(Spain) Aarón Escandell	Cartagena	Transfer	Free	
11 July 2022	(Portugal) Domingos Duarte	Getafe	Transfer	Undisclosed	
13 July 2022	(Spain) Sergio Escudero	Real Valladolid	Transfer	Free	
13 July 2022	(Portugal) Luís Maximiano	(Italy) Lazio	Transfer	Undisclosed	
19 July 2022	(Cameroon) Yan Eteki	(Portugal) Casa Pia	Transfer	Undisclosed	
20 July 2022	(Colombia) Luis Suárez	(France) Marseille	Transfer	Undisclosed	
22 July 2022	(Colombia) Neyder Lozano	Lugo	Transfer	Free	
25 July 2022	(Spain) Antoñín	(Portugal) Vitória de Guimarães	Loan		
25 July 2022	(Spain) Luis Milla	Getafe	Transfer	Undisclosed	
14 August 2022	(Spain) Adrián Marín	(Portugal) Gil Vicente	Transfer	Undisclosed	
19 August 2022	(Spain) Isma Ruiz	Ibiza	Loan		
24 August 2022	(Spain) Adrián Butzke	(Portugal) Paços de Ferreira	Loan		

=== Huesca ===
==== In ====
Date	Player	From	Type	Fee	Ref
10 June 2022	(Cameroon) Patrick Soko	Racing Santander	Transfer	Free	
5 July 2022	(Spain) Ignasi Vilarrasa	Valladolid	Transfer	Free	
8 July 2022	(France) Jérémy Blasco	Real Sociedad B	Transfer	Free	
14 July 2022	(The Gambia) Aboubakary Kanté	Fuenlabrada	Transfer	Free	
18 July 2022	(Japan) Kento Hashimoto	(Russia) Rostov	Loan		
5 August 2022	(Spain) Óscar Sielva	Eibar	Loan		
5 August 2022	(Spain) Juan Villar	Almería	Transfer	Free	
22 August 2022	(Spain) José Ángel Carrillo	Lugo	Transfer	Free	
29 August 2022	(Spain) Rubén Pulido	Fuenlabrada	Transfer	Undisclosed	

==== Out ====
Date	Player	To	Type	Fee	Ref
1 July 2022	(Argentina) Julio Buffarini	Released			
1 July 2022	(Spain) Mikel Rico	Cartagena	Transfer	Free	
1 July 2022	(Spain) Jaime Seoane	Getafe	Transfer	Free	
2 July 2022	(Spain) Pablo Insua	Sporting Gijón	Transfer	Free	
4 July 2022	(Spain) David Ferreiro	Cartagena	Transfer	Free	
4 July 2022	(Spain) Pedro Mosquera	Alcorcón	Transfer	Free	
22 August 2022	(Spain) Sandro Ramírez	Las Palmas	Loan		
31 August 2022	(Spain) Álvaro Fernández	Espanyol	Loan		

=== Ibiza ===
==== In ====
Date	Player	From	Type	Fee	Ref
1 July 2022	(Spain) Suleiman Camara	Girona	Transfer	Free	
1 July 2022	(Brazil) Daniel Fuzato	(Italy) Roma	Transfer	Free	
1 July 2022	(Spain) Álvaro García	Espanyol	Loan		
3 July 2022	(Spain) Martín Pascual	Rayo Vallecano	Loan		
5 July 2022	(Spain) Darío Poveda	Getafe	Loan		
11 July 2022	(Portugal) Zé Carlos	(Portugal) Braga	Loan		
12 July 2022	(England) Armando Shashoua	Atlético Baleares	Transfer	Free	
19 July 2022	(Spain) Iván Morante	Real Madrid Castilla	Transfer	Undisclosed	
19 August 2022	(Spain) Isma Ruiz	Granada	Loan		
31 August 2022	(Poland) Mateusz Bogusz	(England) Leeds United	Loan		
1 September 2022	(England) Miguel Azeez	(England) Arsenal	Loan		
1 September 2022	(Spain) Coke	Levante	Transfer	Free	
5 September 2022	(Spain) Nolito	Celta Vigo	Transfer	Free	

==== Out ====
Date	Player	To	Type	Fee	Ref
1 July 2022	(Spain) David Álvarez	(Poland) Wisła Płock	Transfer	Free	
1 July 2022	(Spain) Rubén González	Racing de Santander	Transfer	Free	
1 July 2022	(Spain) Javi Lara	Alcorcón	Transfer	Free	
1 July 2022	(Spain) Manu Molina	Zaragoza	Transfer	Free	
1 July 2022	(Spain) David Morillas	Alcorcón	Transfer	Free	
20 August 2022	(Spain) Ángel Rodado	(Poland) Wisła Kraków	Transfer	Undisclosed	
25 August 2022	(Spain) Raúl Sánchez	Castellón	Transfer	Undisclosed	
30 August 2022	(Spain) Javi Pérez	Burgos	Transfer	Free	
8 September 2022	(Spain) Nono	Released			

=== Las Palmas ===
==== In ====
Date	Player	From	Type	Fee	Ref
7 July 2022	(Spain) Marc Cardona	Osasuna	Transfer	Free	
7 July 2022	(Brazil) Sidnei	(Brazil) Goiás	Transfer	Undisclosed	
20 July 2022	(Spain) Álvaro Jiménez	Cádiz	Loan		
21 July 2022	(Spain) Vitolo	Atlético Madrid	Loan		
12 August 2022	(Spain) Marvin Park	Real Madrid	Loan		
22 August 2022	(Spain) Sandro Ramírez	Huesca	Loan		
27 August 2022	(Spain) Enrique Clemente	Zaragoza	Transfer	Undisclosed	
1 September 2022	(Romania) Florin Andone	(England) Brighton & Hove Albion	Transfer	Undisclosed	

==== Out ====
Date	Player	To	Type	Fee	Ref
1 July 2022	(Spain) Rafa Mújica	(Portugal) Arouca	Transfer	Undisclosed	
17 July 2022	(Albania) Armando Sadiku	Cartagena	Transfer	Free	
18 July 2022	(Spain) Raúl Fernández	Granada	Transfer	Free	
25 July 2022	(Spain) Maikel Mesa	Albacete	Transfer	Free	
4 August 2022	(Spain) Jesé	(Turkey) MKE Ankaragücü	Transfer	Free	
9 August 2022	(Portugal) Hernâni	(Portugal) Rio Ave	Transfer	Free	
23 August 2022	(Ecuador) Erick Ferigra	(Portugal) Paços de Ferreira	Transfer	Free	

=== Leganés ===
==== In ====
Date	Player	From	Type	Fee	Ref
1 July 2022	(Spain) Dani Raba	Granada	Transfer	Free	
5 July 2022	(Spain) Jorge Sáenz	Valencia	Loan		
19 July 2022	(Spain) Jorge Miramón	Levante	Transfer	Free	
12 August 2022	(Spain) Josema	Elche	Transfer	Free	
26 August 2022	(Spain) Iker Undabarrena	(Portugal) Tondela	Transfer	Undisclosed	
31 August 2022	(Cameroon) Yvan Neyou	(France) Saint-Étienne	Loan		
1 September 2022	(Denmark) Riza Durmisi	(Italy) Lazio	Loan		
5 September 2022	(Poland) Piotr Parzyszek	(Italy) Frosinone	Transfer	Free	

==== Out ====
Date	Player	To	Type	Fee	Ref
1 July 2022	(Spain) Unai Bustinza	Málaga	Transfer	Free	
1 July 2022	(Spain) Javier Eraso	(Cyprus) Akritas Chlorakas	Transfer	Free	
1 July 2022	(Argentina) Facundo García	Released			
3 August 2022	(Spain) Diego García	Fuenlabrada	Loan		
19 August 2022	(Spain) Javi Hernández	Girona	Loan		
26 August 2022	(Venezuela) Josua Mejías	(Israel) Beitar Jerusalem	Transfer	Undisclosed	
1 September 2022	(Brazil) William de Camargo	(Belgium) Deinze	Loan		
10 September 2022	(Spain) Luis Perea	(Greece) OFI Crete	Loan		

=== Levante ===
==== In ====
Date	Player	From	Type	Fee	Ref
1 July 2022	(Spain) Joan Femenías	Oviedo	Transfer	Free	
8 July 2022	(Spain) Álex Muñoz	Tenerife	Transfer	Undisclosed	
14 July 2022	(Spain) Joni Montiel	Rayo Vallecano	Loan		
22 July 2022	(Brazil) Wesley	(England) Aston Villa	Loan		
29 July 2022	(Spain) Vicente Iborra	Villarreal	Loan		
10 August 2022	(Spain) Robert Ibáñez	Osasuna	Transfer	Free	
16 August 2022	(Belgium) Charly Musonda	(England) Chelsea	Transfer	Free	
23 August 2022	(Morocco) Mohamed Bouldini	(Portugal) Santa Clara	Transfer	Undisclosed	

==== Out ====
Date	Player	To	Type	Fee	Ref
1 July 2022	(Spain) José Luis Morales	Villarreal	Transfer	Free	
2 July 2022	(Spain) Aitor Fernández	Levante	Transfer	Free	
6 July 2022	(Russia) Edgar Sevikyan	(Russia) Pari Nizhny Novgorod	Transfer	Undisclosed	
19 July 2022	(Spain) Jorge Miramón	Leganés	Transfer	Free	
21 July 2022	(Spain) Carlos Clerc	Elche	Transfer	Free	
21 July 2022	(Sweden) Omar Faraj	(Sweden) Degerfors	Loan		
4 August 2022	(Spain) Roger Martí	Elche	Transfer	Undisclosed	
12 August 2022	(North Macedonia) Enis Bardhi	(Turkey) Trabzonspor	Transfer	Undisclosed	
12 August 2022	(Martinique) Mickaël Malsa	Real Valladolid	Transfer	Undisclosed	
19 August 2022	(Spain) Álex Blesa	Cultural Leonesa	Loan		
22 August 2022	(Spain) Dani Gómez	Espanyol	Loan		
25 August 2022	(Spain) Antonio Leal	Unionistas de Salamanca	Loan		
30 August 2022	(Georgia (country)) Giorgi Kochorashvili	Castellón	Loan		
1 September 2022	(Spain) Coke	Ibiza	Transfer	Free	
1 September 2022	(Spain) Gonzalo Melero	Almería	Transfer	Undisclosed	

=== Lugo ===
==== In ====
Date	Player	From	Type	Fee	Ref
1 July 2022	(Spain) Ángel Baena	Betis Deportivo	Transfer	Free	
4 July 2022	(Costa Rica) Patrick Sequeira	Real Unión	Transfer	Free	
5 July 2022	(Spain) Marc Carbó	San Fernando	Transfer	Free	
7 July 2022	(Brazil) Zé Ricardo	(Portugal) Feirense	Transfer	Free	
10 July 2022	(Spain) Jordi Calavera	Girona	Transfer	Free	
22 July 2022	(Colombia) Neyder Lozano	Granada	Transfer	Free	
1 August 2022	(Spain) Miguel Loureiro	Racing Ferrol	Transfer	Free	
4 August 2022	(Brazil) Bruno Pirri	Free Agent			
26 August 2022	(Mauritania) El Hacen	Free Agent			

==== Out ====
Date	Player	To	Type	Fee	Ref
1 July 2022	(Spain) Fran Vieites	Betis Deportivo	Transfer	Free	
25 July 2022	(Spain) Juan Antonio Ros	Albacete	Transfer	Undisclosed	
22 August 2022	(Spain) José Ángel Carrillo	Huesca	Transfer	Free	

=== Málaga ===
==== In ====
Date	Player	From	Type	Fee	Ref
2 July 2022	(Spain) Unai Bustinza	Leganés	Transfer	Free	
15 July 2022	(Angola) Jonás Ramalho	Osasuna	Transfer	Free	
15 July 2022	(Spain) Rubén Yáñez	Getafe	Transfer	Free	

==== Out ====
Date	Player	To	Type	Fee	Ref
30 June 2022	(Spain) Dani Barrio	Burgos	Transfer	Free	
3 July 2022	(Spain) Iván Calero	Cartagena	Transfer	Free	
23 July 2022	(Spain) Kevin Villodres	(Portugal) Gil Vicente	Loan		

=== Mirandés ===
==== In ====
Date	Player	From	Type	Fee	Ref
1 July 2022	(Spain) Roberto López	Real Sociedad B	Loan	Free	
14 July 2022	(Spain) Beñat Prados	Athletic Bilbao	Loan		
30 July 2022	(Spain) José Salinas	Elche	Loan		
4 August 2022	(Spain) Raúl Parra	Cádiz	Loan		
8 August 2022	(Spain) Juanlu Sánchez	Sevilla	Loan		
11 August 2022	(Spain) Nico Serrano	Athletic Bilbao	Loan		
14 August 2022	(Spain) Jofre Carreras	Espanyol	Loan		
1 September 2022	(Portugal) Marcos Paulo	Atlético Madrid	Loan		

==== Out ====
Date	Player	To	Type	Fee	Ref
7 July 2022	(Spain) Raúl Lizoain	Andorra	Transfer	Free	
10 August 2022	(Spain) Víctor Meseguer	Granada	Transfer	Undisclosed	

=== Oviedo ===
==== In ====
Date	Player	From	Type	Fee	Ref
1 July 2022	(France) Quentin Braat	(France) Chamois Niortais	Transfer	Free	
11 July 2022	(Spain) Miguelón	Espanyol	Loan		
25 August 2022	(New Caledonia) Koba Koindredi	Valencia	Loan		

==== Out ====
Date	Player	To	Type	Fee	Ref
1 July 2022	(Spain) Joan Femenías	Levante	Transfer	Free	

=== Ponferradina ===
==== In ====
Date	Player	From	Type	Fee	Ref
8 August 2022	(Ghana) Sabit Abdulai	Getafe	Loan		
1 September 2022	(Spain) Hugo Vallejo	Real Valladolid	Loan		

==== Out ====
Date	Player	To	Type	Fee	Ref
1 July 2022	(Spain) José Manuel Copete	Mallorca	Transfer	Free	
1 September 2022	(Spain) Juan Hernández	Burgos	Transfer	Free	

=== Racing Santander ===
==== In ====
Date	Player	From	Type	Fee	Ref
1 July 2022	(Spain) Alfon	Celta Vigo	Loan		
1 July 2022	(Spain) Rubén González	Ibiza	Transfer	Free	
2 July 2022	(Colombia) Juergen Elitim	(England) Watford	Loan		
29 July 2022	(Spain) Saúl García	Alavés	Transfer	Free	
29 August 2022	(Senegal) Sekou Gassama	Real Valladolid	Loan		
1 September 2022	(Spain) Jorge Pombo	Cádiz	Transfer	Free	

==== Out ====
Date	Player	To	Type	Fee	Ref
10 June 2022	(Cameroon) Patrick Soko	Huesca	Transfer	Free	

=== Sporting Gijón ===
==== In ====
Date	Player	From	Type	Fee	Ref
1 July 2022	(Spain) Fran Villalba	(England) Birmingham City	Buyout clause	Undisclosed	
4 July 2022	(Spain) Pablo Insua	Huesca	Transfer	Free	
28 July 2022	(Spain) Jony Rodríguez	(Italy) Lazio	Loan		
31 July 2022	(Spain) Cote	Osasuna	Transfer	Free	
30 August 2022	(Ivory Coast) Axel Bamba	(France) Paris	Transfer	Undisclosed	

==== Out ====
Date	Player	To	Type	Fee	Ref
1 July 2022	(Spain) Borja López	(Belgium) Zulte Waregem	Transfer	Free	
8 July 2022	(Ukraine) Bohdan Milovanov	(Portugal) Arouca	Transfer	Undisclosed	
18 August 2022	(Spain) Gaspar Campos	Burgos	Loan		

=== Tenerife ===
==== In ====
Date	Player	From	Type	Fee	Ref
30 June 2022	(Spain) Alberto Jiménez	Albacete	Loan return		
7 July 2022	(Spain) Javi Díaz	Sevilla	Transfer	Undisclosed	
22 July 2022	(Ghana) Mohammed Dauda	(Belgium) Anderlecht	Loan		
31 August 2022	(Spain) Iván Romero	Sevilla	Loan		
1 September 2022	(England) Arvin Appiah	Almería	Loan		

==== Out ====
Date	Player	To	Type	Fee	Ref
8 July 2022	(Spain) Álex Muñoz	Levante	Transfer	Undisclosed	
21 July 2022	(Spain) Álex Bermejo	Burgos	Transfer	Free	

=== Villarreal B ===
==== In ====
Date	Player	From	Type	Fee	Ref
6 July 2022	(Argentina) Thiago Ojeda	(Argentina) Vélez Sarsfield	Transfer	Free	
5 August 2022	(Spain) Sergio Carreira	Celta Vigo	Loan		
26 August 2022	(Senegal) Mamadou Fall	(United States) Los Angeles FC	Loan		
26 August 2022	(Ecuador) Liberman Torres	(Ecuador) Independiente del Valle	Transfer	Free	

==== Out ====
Date	Player	To	Type	Fee	Ref
30 June 2022	(Spain) Lanchi	San Fernando	Loan		

=== Zaragoza ===
==== In ====
Date	Player	From	Type	Fee	Ref
1 July 2022	(Spain) Manu Molina	Ibiza	Transfer	Free	
4 July 2022	(Argentina) Giuliano Simeone	Atlético Madrid	Loan		

==== Out ====
Date	Player	To	Type	Fee	Ref
1 July 2022	(Spain) Marc Aguado	Andorra	Loan		
5 August 2022	(Equatorial Guinea) Federico Bikoro	(Norway) Sandefjord	Transfer	Undisclosed	
27 August 2022	(Spain) Enrique Clemente	Las Palmas	Transfer	Undisclosed	
31 August 2022	(Spain) Pep Chavarría	Rayo Vallecano	Transfer	Undisclosed	
1 September 2022	(Colombia) Juanjo Narváez	Real Valladolid	Transfer	Undisclosed	
