= Juanma (footballer, born 1984) =

Spanish footballer

Personal information
- Full name: Juan Manuel Espinosa Valenzuela
- Date of birth: 8 August 1984 (age 42)
- Place of birth: Jaén, Spain
- Height: 1.71 m (5 ft 7 in)
- Position: Midfielder

Team information
- Current team: Atlético Mancha Real

Youth career
- Jaén

Senior career*
Years	Team	Apps	(Gls)
2003–2004	Martos		
2004–2005	Úbeda		
2005–2006	Alcalá	34	(1)
2006–2007	Poli Ejido B	28	(1)
2007	Ontinyent	7	(0)
2008	Burgos	8	(0)
2008–2009	Móstoles	34	(4)
2009–2011	Mancha Real	66	(2)
2011–2014	Real Jaén	117	(3)
2014–2015	Cádiz	38	(0)
2015–2017	Hércules	69	(5)
2017–2018	Melilla	36	(3)
2018–2020	Real Jaén	68	(4)
2021–	Atlético Mancha Real	114	(5)
- * Club domestic league appearances and goals as of 13 October 2024

Juan Manuel Espinosa Valenzuela (born 8 August 1984), known as Juanma, is a Spanish footballer who plays for Atlético Mancha Real as a central midfielder.

== Club career ==
Born in Jaén, Andalusia, Juanma made his senior debut with Martos CD. He first arrived in Segunda División B in the 2005–06 season, starting often and being relegated with RSD Alcalá.

In the following years, Juanma alternated between the third level and Tercera División, representing Polideportivo Ejido B, Ontinyent CF, Burgos CF, CD Móstoles and Atlético Mancha Real. On 8 July 2011 he signed with Real Jaén, achieving promotion to division two at the end of the 2012–13 campaign and contributing with 36 appearances to the feat.

On 18 August 2013, at already 29, Juanma played his first game as a professional, starting in a 1–2 home loss against SD Eibar. He scored his first and only goal in the second tier on 15 December, helping the hosts defeat RCD Mallorca 2–1.
