= Albiol =

Albiol may refer to:

== Places ==
- L'Albiol, a municipality in Tarragona, Spain

== People ==
- Miguel Albiol (born 1981), Spanish footballer
- Raúl Albiol (born 1985), Spanish footballer
- Sergio Albiol (born 1987), Spanish footballer
- Xavier García Albiol (born 1967), Spanish politician
