= Jonathan Gómez (soccer, born 2003) =

American professional soccer player (born 2003)

Personal information
- Full name: Jonathan Germán Gómez Mendoza
- Date of birth: September 1, 2003 (age 23)
- Place of birth: North Richland Hills, Texas, United States
- Height: 5 ft 10 in (1.78 m)
- Position: Left-back

Team information
- Current team: VfL Osnabrück (on loan from PAOK)
- Number: 42

Youth career
- 2016–2020: FC Dallas

Senior career*
Years	Team	Apps	(Gls)
2019	North Texas SC	8	(0)
2020–2021	Louisville City FC	36	(2)
2022–2024	Real Sociedad B	42	(1)
2023–2024	→ Mirandés (loan)	38	(1)
2024–	PAOK	2	(0)
2025–2026	→ Albacete (loan)	37	(2)
2026–	→ VfL Osnabrück (loan)	0	(0)

International career^{‡}
2019	United States U16	6	(1)
2019	Mexico U16	1	(0)
2019	United States U17	1	(0)
2021–2022	Mexico U20	2	(0)
2022–2023	United States U20	11	(1)
2022	Mexico	1	(0)
2021–2023	United States	2	(0)
- * Club domestic league appearances and goals as of September 2, 2026 ‡ National team caps and goals as of June 4, 2023

Jonathan Germán Gómez Mendoza (born September 1, 2003) is an American professional soccer player who plays as a left-back for 2. Bundesliga club VfL Osnabrück, on loan from Super League Greece club PAOK. He has one previous friendly cap for the Mexico national team but has most recently represented the United States national team.

== Youth soccer ==
Gómez joined the FC Dallas academy in 2016, at the age of 12. He progressed through the ranks starting with the U-13 side as a left winger. During his three years with the FCD academy he transitioned to playing fullback. After three years with the academy Gómez signed an amateur contract with FC Dallas's reserve side North Texas SC in USL League One at the age of 15. During his time with North Texas, Gómez appeared in eight league matches and tallied 2 assists as part of their title-winning campaign in the 2019 USL League One season.

== Professional career ==
=== Louisville City ===
On March 5, 2020, Louisville City FC announced that it had signed Gómez to a professional contract. Gómez proceeded to appear 36 times in the USL Championship and score two goals in his bid to set a precedent within the club as a youth development player. At the end of the 2021 USL Championship season, Gómez was named the 2021 USL Championship Young Player of the Year and also named to the USL Championship's All-League First Team.

=== Real Sociedad ===
On September 30, 2021, Real Sociedad announced an agreement with Louisville City for the transfer of Gómez, with the player signing a contract until 2025 and being initially assigned to Real Sociedad B in Segunda División. The deal took effect January 1, 2022.

On March 2, 2022, Gómez was included in Real Sociedad's La Liga matchday squad for the first time against RCD Mallorca. On August 11, 2023, he joined Segunda División side Mirandés on a season-long loan deal.

=== PAOK ===
On August 23, 2024, Gómez joined Super League Greece side PAOK on a three-year contract. He made his club debut on October 6, starting in a 2–0 away win over Levadiakos.

==== Loan to Albacete ====
On July 10, 2025, after featuring rarely, Gómez returned to Spain after agreeing to a one-year loan deal with Albacete, with a buyout clause.

==== Loan to VfL Osnabrück ====
On September 1, 2026, Gómez moved on loan to VfL Osnabrück in German 2. Bundesliga.

== International career ==
Gómez was born and raised in the United States to Mexican parents and was extensively pursued by the national team federations of both countries. He represented both the United States and Mexico at the U16 level, including winning the 2019 UEFA Development Tournament and 2019 Nike International Friendlies with the United States U16s and third place at the 2019 Nordic Cup with Mexico U16s.

Gómez was a non-roster trainee with Mexico during their loss to the United States in the 2021 CONCACAF Nations League Finals. Gómez was subsequently named to the United States provisional squad for the 2021 CONCACAF Gold Cup although he did not make the final roster as the United States won the Final over Mexico. In October 2021, Gómez played in a pair of friendlies for Mexico U20s in Europe.

On December 3, 2021, Gómez was called up to the United States national team for a friendly match against Bosnia and Herzegovina. On December 18, Gómez made his senior international debut as an 84th-minute substitute and his shot on goal was rebounded in by Cole Bassett for the United States' 1–0 victory.

On April 21, 2022, Gómez was called up to the Mexico national team for a friendly match against Guatemala on April 27, in which he was subbed on in the 82nd minute. He thus became the fourth player to be capped by both the United States and Mexico senior national teams. Because both matches were friendlies, Gómez was not cap-tied to either nation.

In May 2022, Gómez was named to the provisional squads of both the United States U20s and Mexico U20s for the 2022 CONCACAF U-20 Championship but could not participate for either nation due to injury. After the United States U20s won the tournament to qualify for the 2023 FIFA U-20 World Cup and 2024 Olympics while Mexico U20s failed to qualify for either, Gómez was called up in September 2022 to the United States U20s for the 2022 Revelations Cup in Mexico. Gómez played in all three of the United States U20s' friendlies including against Mexico U20s.

On January 18, 2023, Gómez was called up for the second time to the United States national team for friendly matches against Serbia and Colombia and made his first senior international start against Serbia.

On May 20, 2023, Gómez scored the winning goal for the United States U20s in their opening match against Ecuador U20s at the 2023 FIFA U-20 World Cup. Gómez played every match for the Americans as they won their first four matches before losing in the quarterfinal to the eventual champions Uruguay U20s.

== Personal life ==
Jonathan is the younger brother of soccer player Johan Gomez, who formerly played for North Texas SC and FC Porto B .

== Career statistics ==
=== Club ===
As of match played April 10, 2025

Appearances and goals by club, season and competition
Club	Season	League			National cup (Note: Includes Copa del Rey, Greek Football Cup)		Other		Total	
Club	Season	Division	Apps	Goals	Apps	Goals	Apps	Goals	Apps	Goals
North Texas SC	2019	USL League One	8	0	–		1 (Note: Appearances in USL League One Playoffs)	0	9	0
Louisville City FC	2020	USL	10	0	–		–		10	0
Louisville City FC	2021	USL	26	2	–		3 (Note: Appearances in USL Championship play-offs)	0	29	2
Louisville City FC	Total		36	2	–		3	0	39	2
Real Sociedad B	2021–22	Segunda División	14	0	–		–		14	0
Real Sociedad B	2022–23	Primera División RFEF	28	1	–		–		28	1
Real Sociedad B	Total		42	1	–		–		42	1
Mirandés (loan)	2023–24	Segunda División	38	1	1	0	–		39	1
PAOK	2024–25	Super League Greece	2	0	2	0	–		4	0
Career total			126	4	3	0	4	0	133	4

=== International ===
As of match played January 26, 2023

Appearances and goals by national team and year
National team	Year	Apps	Goals
United States	2021	1	0
United States	2022	0	0
United States	2023	1	0
Career total		2	0

== Honors ==
North Texas SC

- USL League One Regular Season Title: 2019
- USL League One Championship: 2019

Individual

- USL Championship All League First Team: 2021
- USL Championship Young Player of the Year: 2021
