= David Morillas =

Spanish footballer (born 1986)

Personal information
- Full name: David Morillas Jiménez
- Date of birth: 28 September 1986 (age 40)
- Place of birth: Águilas, Spain
- Height: 1.86 m (6 ft 1 in)
- Position: Left back

Team information
- Current team: Atlético Pulpileño

Senior career*
Years	Team	Apps	(Gls)
2005–2006	Cuevas		
2006–2008	Pulpileño	?	(10)
2008–2009	Poli Ejido B	32	(1)
2009–2010	Águilas	31	(1)
2010–2011	Roquetas	36	(1)
2011–2012	Conquense	38	(1)
2012–2013	Arroyo	33	(0)
2013–2014	La Hoya Lorca	41	(0)
2014–2016	Huesca	75	(0)
2016–2017	UCAM Murcia	26	(1)
2017–2018	Albacete	26	(0)
2018–2019	Rayo Majadahonda	34	(0)
2019–2022	Ibiza	69	(0)
2022–2024	Alcorcón	59	(0)
2024–2025	Águilas	30	(0)
2025–	Atlético Pulpileño	4	(0)
- * Club domestic league appearances and goals as of 28 September 2025

David Morillas Jiménez (born 28 September 1986) is a Spanish footballer who plays as a left back for Tercera Federación club Atlético Pulpileño.

== Club career ==
Born in Águilas, Region of Murcia, Morillas made his debut with Cuevas CF in the regional leagues, in 2005. He first arrived in Segunda División B only in 2009, after spells at CA Pulpileño (where he scored a career-best ten goals during his first and only campaign) and Polideportivo Ejido B, agreeing to a contract with Águilas CF.

Morillas remained in the third division in the following years, representing CD Roquetas, UB Conquense, Arroyo CP, La Hoya Lorca CF and SD Huesca. With the latter he achieved promotion to Segunda División at the end of the campaign, appearing in 44 matches.

Morillas made his professional debut on 22 August 2015, playing the full 90 minutes in a 2–3 home loss against Deportivo Alavés. On 3 November, he renewed his contract until 2017.

On 29 August 2016, Morillas signed a two-year contract with fellow league team UCAM Murcia CF, after rescinding with Huesca. He scored his first professional goal on 20 May of the following year, his team's third in a 3–1 home win against his former club Huesca.

On 6 July 2017, after suffering relegation with UCAM, Morillas joined Albacete Balompié also in the second tier. On 23 July of the following year, he moved to fellow league team CF Rayo Majadahonda.

On 20 July 2019, Morillas joined UD Ibiza in the third division. He was a regular starter in the club's first-ever promotion to the second level, before leaving on 18 May 2022.

On 27 July 2022, 35-year-old Morillas joined AD Alcorcón in Primera Federación.

On 28 June 2024, Morillas returned to his hometown and signed with Águilas FC in Segunda Federación.
