= Sergio Albiol =

Spanish footballer

Personal information
- Full name: Sergio Plaza Albiol
- Date of birth: 11 March 1987 (age 39)
- Place of birth: Málaga, Spain
- Height: 1.75 m (5 ft 9 in)
- Position: Right-back

Youth career
- Málaga

Senior career*
Years	Team	Apps	(Gls)
2006	Málaga B	1	(0)
2006–2009	Poli Ejido B	52	(1)
2009–2010	Murallas Ceuta	12	(0)
2010–2011	Vélez	28	(0)
2011–2012	Sporting Villanueva	18	(0)
2012–2013	Lucena	38	(0)
2013–2014	La Roda	27	(0)
2014–2015	Lucena	27	(0)
2015–2017	Jumilla	60	(0)
2017–2019	Ontinyent	36	(0)
2020	Lorca	4	(0)
Total		303	(1)
- * Club domestic league appearances and goals

Sergio Plaza Albiol (born 11 March 1987) is a Spanish former footballer who played as a right-back.

He played one Segunda División match with Málaga B, and spent the rest of his career in the lower leagues.

== Club career ==
Born in Málaga, Andalusia, Albiol graduated from local Málaga CF's youth system. He made his professional debut with the reserves on 21 May 2006, playing the entire second half of a 4–1 Segunda División away loss against Real Madrid Castilla.

After spending five seasons in the Tercera División (where he represented Polideportivo Ejido B, Murallas de Ceuta FC and Vélez CF), Albiol first arrived in the Segunda División B in 2011, signing with Sporting Villanueva Promesas. He continued to compete at the latter level the following years, with Lucena CF (two stints), La Roda CF, FC Jumilla and Ontinyent CF.

On 28 March 2019, after the club's dissolution, Albiol left Ontinyent. He remained without a club until February 2020, when he joined Lorca FC on a short-term contract.
