= Peter Pokorný (footballer) =

Slovak footballer (born 2001)

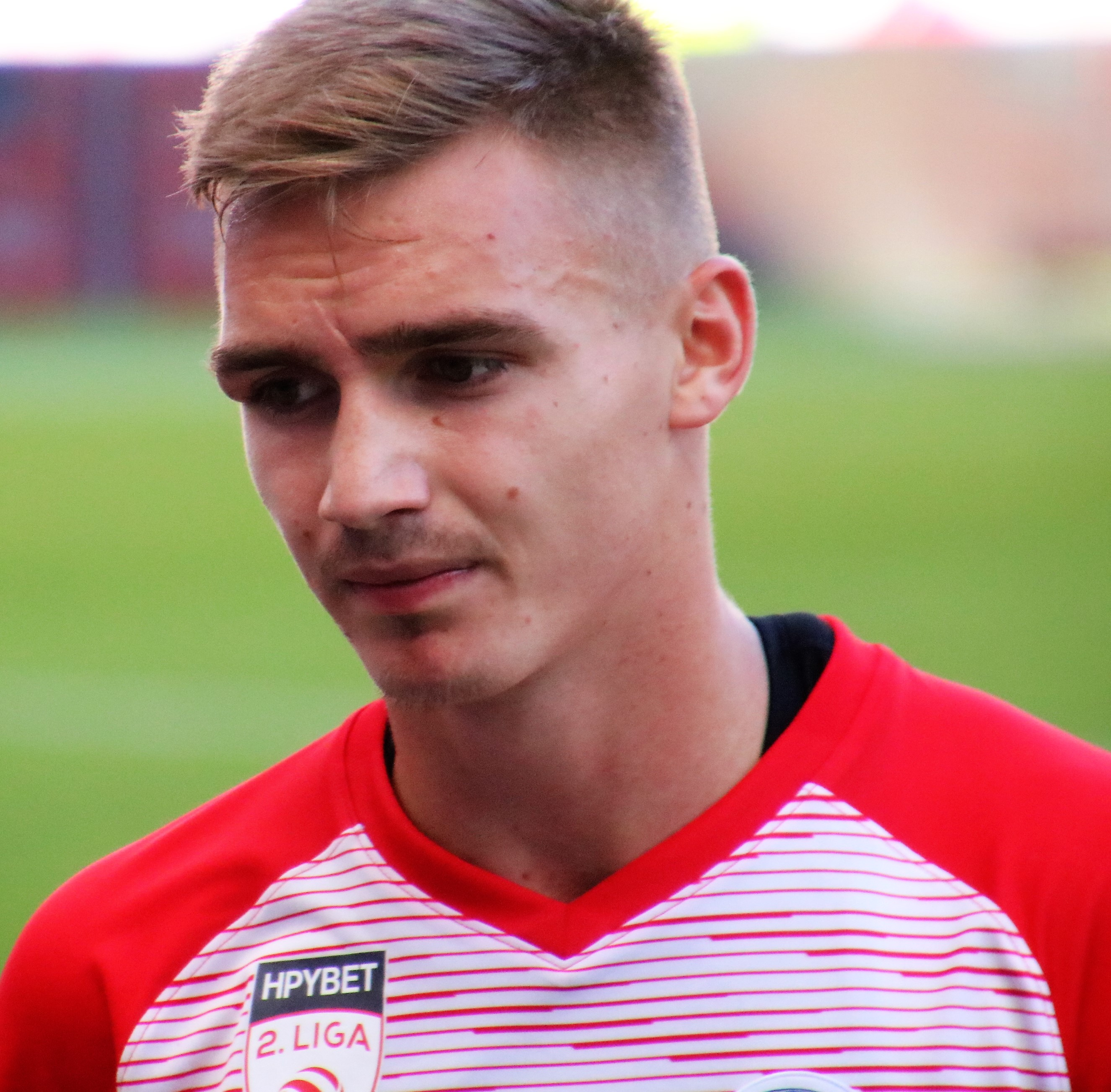
- Pokorný in 2019 with Liefering

Personal information
- Date of birth: 8 August 2001 (age 25)
- Place of birth: Trenčín, Slovakia
- Height: 1.81 m (5 ft 11 1/2 in)
- Position: Defensive midfielder

Team information
- Current team: Slovan Bratislava
- Number: 3

Youth career
- 2007–2018: AS Trenčín

Senior career*
Years	Team	Apps	(Gls)
2018–2019	FC Liefering	23	(0)
2019–2021	Red Bull Salzburg	0	(0)
2019–2020	→ FC Liefering (loan)	14	(0)
2020–2021	→ SKN St. Pölten (loan)	30	(0)
2021–2023	Real Sociedad B	24	(0)
2022–2023	→ Fehérvár (loan)	23	(0)
2023–2025	Śląsk Wrocław	49	(0)
2025–	Slovan Bratislava	29	(1)

International career^{‡}
2016	Slovakia U15	2	(0)
2017	Slovakia U16	1	(0)
2018	Slovakia U17	5	(2)
2018	Slovakia U20	1	(0)
2019–2022	Slovakia U21	22	(2)
2026–	Slovakia	3	(0)
- * Club domestic league appearances and goals as of 20:00, 31 October 2026 (UTC) ‡ National team caps and goals as of 18 November 2026

Peter Pokorný (born 8 August 2001) is a Slovak professional footballer who plays as a defensive midfielder for Slovak club Slovan Bratislava.

== Club career ==
Pokorný started playing football with AS Trenčín, before moving to the academy of Red Bull Salzburg. In 2018 he signed with FC Liefering, the feeder team of FC Red Bull Salzburg.

Pokorný made his debut for FC Liefering on 3 August 2018, before being replaced by Nikola Stošić in the 63rd minute.

On 16 June 2021, Pokorný signed a three-year deal with Spanish side Real Sociedad, being placed initially into the B team under manager Xabi Alonso.

After one season, however, in July 2022, Pokorný departed to Hungarian Nemzeti Bajnokság I to feature for Fehérvár on a one-year loan deal.

On 9 August 2023, he joined Polish Ekstraklasa side Śląsk Wrocław on a two-year deal, with an extension option for another year.

== International career ==
Pokorný was first recognised as an alternate broader squad member for the senior Slovak national team on 28 September 2021 ahead of two 2022 FIFA World Cup qualifiers against Russia and Croatia. Pokorný then first penetrated into the national team nomination in November 2022 by Francesco Calzona being listed as a part of a 27-man squad for two friendly fixtures against Montenegro and Marek Hamšík's retirement game against Chile. While he was available on the bench for both of the fixtures, he was not fielded in either of them. Subsequently, in December 2022, Pokorný was shortlisted in a nomination for senior national team prospective players' training camp at NTC Senec.

== Personal life ==
Other than his native Slovak, Pokorný also speaks English, German and Spanish.

== Career statistics ==
=== Club ===
As of match played 3 November 2026

Appearances and goals by club, season and competition
Club	Season	League			National cup (Note: Includes Austrian Cup, Magyar Kupa, Polish Cup)		Europe		Other		Total	
Club	Season	Division	Apps	Goals	Apps	Goals	Apps	Goals	Apps	Goals	Apps	Goals
FC Liefering	2018–19	2. League	23	0	0	0	—		—		23	0
FC Liefering (loan)	2019–20	2. League	14	0	0	0	—		—		14	0
FC Liefering (loan)	Total		37	0	0	0	—		—		37	0
SKN St. Pölten (loan)	2020–21	Bundesliga	29	0	2	0	—		1 (Note: Appearance(s) in relegation play-offs)	0	32	0
Real Sociedad B	2021–22	Segunda División	24	0	—		—		—		24	0
Fehérvár (loan)	2022–23	NB I	23	0	1	0	3 (Note: Appearances in UEFA Conference League)	0	—		27	0
Śląsk Wrocław	2023–24	Ekstraklasa	27	0	1	0	—		—		28	0
Śląsk Wrocław	2024–25	Ekstraklasa	20	0	2	0	4	0	—		26	0
Śląsk Wrocław	Total		47	0	3	0	4	0	—		54	0
Slovan Bratislava	2025–26	Slovak First Football League	20	0	2	0	9 (Note: Four appearances in UEFA Champions League, two appearances in UEFA Europa League, three appearances in UEFA Conference League)	0	0	0	31	0
Slovan Bratislava	2026–27	Slovak First Football League	9	1	0	0	10 (Note: Appearances in UEFA Champions League)	0	—		19	1
Slovan Bratislava	Total		29	1	2	0	19	0	0	0	50	1
Career total			189	1	8	0	26	0	1	0	224	1

=== International ===
As of match played 16 November 2026

Appearances and goals by national team and year
National team	Year	Apps	Goals
Slovakia	2026	3	0
Total		3	0
