= Imanol Ezkurdia =

Spanish association football player

Personal information
- Full name: Imanol Ezkurdia Ugalde
- Date of birth: 4 January 1999 (age 27)
- Place of birth: Lezo, Spain
- Height: 1.80 m (5 ft 11 in)
- Position: Centre-back

Youth career
- 2011–2018: Real Sociedad

Senior career*
Years	Team	Apps	(Gls)
2018–2019	Real Sociedad C	16	(0)
2019–2023	Real Sociedad B	77	(1)
2022	→ Real Unión (loan)	2	(0)
2023–2024	Logroñés	16	(2)
2024–2025	Guijuelo	25	(1)
- * Club domestic league appearances and goals

Imanol Ezkurdia Ugalde (born 4 January 1999) is a Spanish professional footballer who plays as a centre-back.

== Club career ==
Born in Lezo, Gipuzkoa, Basque Country, Ezkurdia joined Real Sociedad's youth setup in 2011, aged 12. He made his senior debut with the C-team during the 2017–18 season, in Tercera División.

Ezkurdia first appeared with the reserves on 10 March 2019, starting in a 1–1 Segunda División B home draw against CD Tudelano. On 5 February 2021, he renewed his contract with the Txuri-urdin until 2023, and was a regular starter the campaign as his side returned to Segunda División after 59 years.

Ezkurdia made his professional debut on 21 August 2021, starting in a 0–0 away draw against CD Lugo. On 28 December, after featuring rarely, he was loaned to Primera División RFEF side Real Unión until June.
