= Yago Cantero =

Spanish footballer

Personal information
- Full name: Yago Cantero Pérez
- Date of birth: 26 January 2000 (age 26)
- Place of birth: Bera, Spain
- Height: 1.85 m (6 ft 1 in)
- Position: Centre-back

Team information
- Current team: Hércules

Youth career
- 2012–2019: Real Sociedad

Senior career*
Years	Team	Apps	(Gls)
2019–2022	Real Sociedad C	60	(3)
2021–2024	Real Sociedad B	67	(1)
2024–2026	Ceuta	41	(2)
2026–	Hércules	0	(0)
- * Club domestic league appearances and goals as of 9 June 2026

Yago Cantero Pérez (born 26 January 2000) is a Spanish professional footballer who plays as a centre-back for Hércules CF.

== Career ==
Born in Bera, Navarre, Cantero joined Real Sociedad's youth sides in 2012, aged 12. He made his senior debut with the C-team on 25 August 2019, coming on as a second-half substitute in a 1–1 Tercera División home draw against Club Portugalete.

After establishing himself as a regular for the C's, Cantero first appeared with the reserves on 18 April 2021, replacing Robert Navarro late into a 3–2 Segunda División B home win over CD Tudelano. He was definitely promoted to the B-side for the 2022–23 season, and renewed his contract until 2024 on 15 March 2023.

Cantero became a regular starter for the B's in the following years, but suffered a knee injury in April 2024 which sidelined him for the remainder of the campaign. Despite being out of contract, he was kept at Sanse until his full recovery, and signed for AD Ceuta FC also in the third division on 29 August.

Cantero became a regular starter for the Caballas during the season, featuring in 35 matches overall and scoring twice as the club achieved promotion to Segunda División; one of his goals was the opener in a 2–1 away win over CF Fuenlabrada on 11 May 2025, which ensured the club's automatic promotion.

Cantero made his professional debut on 15 August 2025, starting in a 3–0 away loss to Real Valladolid. The following 4 July, he moved to Hércules CF in the third division.
