= Peru Rodríguez =

Spanish footballer (born 2002)

Personal information
- Full name: Peru Rodríguez Larrañaga
- Date of birth: 3 April 2002 (age 24)
- Place of birth: Antzuola, Spain
- Height: 1.90 m (6 ft 3 in)
- Position: Centre-back

Team information
- Current team: Mirandés

Youth career
- Real Sociedad
- → Bergara (loan)

Senior career*
Years	Team	Apps	(Gls)
2020–2022	Real Sociedad C	41	(2)
2021–2026	Real Sociedad B	88	(4)
2026	Cultural Leonesa	4	(0)
2026–	Mirandés	0	(0)
- * Club domestic league appearances and goals as of 31 May 2026

Peru Rodríguez Larrañaga (born 3 April 2002) is a Spanish professional footballer who plays as a central defender for CD Mirandés.

== Career ==
Born in Antzuola, Gipuzkoa, Basque Country, Rodríguez represented Real Sociedad and Bergara KE as a youth. He made his senior debut with the C-team on 26 January 2020, coming on as second-half substitute in a 1–0 away win over CD Vitoria.

Rodríguez scored his first senior goal on 14 February 2021, netting the C's fourth in a 5–0 home routing of Urgatzi KK. He first appeared with the reserves on 12 November, starting in a 1–0 away success over Sporting de Gijón in the Segunda División.

Rodríguez became a regular starter for the B-team in the 2023–24 season, and contributed with two goals in 38 appearances overall during the 2024–25 season as the club returned to the second division. He scored his first professional goal on 5 November 2025, netting the opener through a penalty kick in a 2–0 home win over SD Huesca.

On 1 February 2026, Rodríguez moved to fellow division two side Cultural y Deportiva Leonesa on a six-month contract. On 17 July, after being rarely used as the club suffered relegation, he agreed to a one-year deal with CD Mirandés, also relegated to Primera Federación.
