= Germán Valera =

Spanish footballer (born 2002)

Personal information
- Full name: Germán Valera Karabinaite
- Date of birth: 16 March 2002 (age 24)
- Place of birth: Murcia, Spain
- Height: 1.70 m (5 ft 7 in)
- Position: Winger

Team information
- Current team: Elche
- Number: 11

Youth career
- 2012–2018: Villarreal
- 2018–2019: Atlético Madrid

Senior career*
Years	Team	Apps	(Gls)
2019–2021	Atlético Madrid B	23	(6)
2020–2024	Atlético Madrid	1	(0)
2021	→ Tenerife (loan)	17	(2)
2021–2022	→ Real Sociedad B (loan)	20	(1)
2021–2022	→ Real Sociedad (loan)	3	(0)
2022–2023	→ Andorra (loan)	38	(2)
2023–2024	→ Zaragoza (loan)	38	(1)
2024–2025	Valencia	8	(0)
2025	→ Elche (loan)	16	(3)
2025–	Elche	36	(4)

International career
2018	Spain U16	6	(1)
2017–2019	Spain U17	21	(4)
2019	Spain U18	2	(0)
- * Club domestic league appearances and goals as of 27 May 2026

Germán Valera Karabinaite (born 16 March 2002) is a Spanish professional footballer who plays as a right winger for La Liga club Elche CF.

== Club career ==
Born in Murcia to a Lithuanian mother, Valera joined Atlético Madrid's youth setup in 2018, from Villarreal CF. Promoted to the reserves for the 2019–20 season, he made his senior debut on 24 August 2019, coming on as second-half substitute in a 2–1 Segunda División B away win against Marino de Luanco.

Valera scored his first senior goal on 13 October 2019, scoring his team's third in a 3–0 home defeat of Coruxo FC. He made his first team – and La Liga – debut the following 4 January, replacing João Félix late into a 2–1 home success over Levante UD.

On 1 February 2021, Valera renewed his contract until 2026 and moved to Segunda División side CD Tenerife on loan for the remainder of the season. On 11 August, he moved to fellow second division side Real Sociedad B on a one-year loan deal.

On 25 August 2022, Valera joined FC Andorra also in the second level, on a one-year loan deal. On 8 August of the following year, he moved to fellow league team Real Zaragoza also in a temporary deal.

On 30 August 2024, Valera signed a four-year contract with Valencia CF in the top tier. The following 3 February, he was loaned to Elche CF in the second tier until the end of the season.

On 3 July 2025, after helping the Franjiverdes to achieve promotion to the first division, Valera signed a permanent two-year deal with the club.

== Career statistics ==
As of match played on 3 January 2026

Club statistics
Club	Season	League			National Cup		Continental		Other		Total	
Club	Season	Division	Apps	Goals	Apps	Goals	Apps	Goals	Apps	Goals	Apps	Goals
Atlético Madrid	2019–20	La Liga	1	0	0	0	—		—		1	0
Atlético Madrid B	2019–20	Segunda División B	14	4	—		—		1 (Note: Appearance in the 2020 Segunda División B play-offs)	0	15	4
Atlético Madrid B	2020–21	Segunda División B	9	2	—		—		—		9	2
Atlético Madrid B	Total		23	6	0	0	0	0	1	0	24	6
Tenerife (loan)	2020–21	Segunda División	17	2	0	0	—		—		17	2
Real Sociedad (loan)	2021–22	La Liga	3	0	0	0	—		—		3	0
Real Sociedad B (loan)	2021–22	Segunda División	20	1	—		—		—		20	1
Andorra (loan)	2022–23	Segunda División	38	2	1	0	—		—		39	2
Zaragoza (loan)	2023–24	Segunda División	38	1	1	0	—		—		39	1
Valencia	2024–25	La Liga	8	0	4	0	—		—		12	0
Elche (loan)	2024–25	Segunda División	16	3	0	0	—		—		16	3
Elche	2025–26	La Liga	17	3	0	0	—		—		17	3
Career totals			181	18	6	0	0	0	1	0	188	18

== International career ==
Eligible to play for Spain or Lithuania, Valera is a youth international footballer for the former.
