= Julen Lobete =

Spanish footballer (born 2000)

Personal information
- Full name: Julen Lobete Cienfuegos
- Date of birth: 18 September 2000 (age 26)
- Place of birth: Lezo, Spain
- Height: 1.77 m (5 ft 10 in)
- Position: Winger

Team information
- Current team: Málaga
- Number: 24

Youth career
- Allerru
- Antiguoko
- 2018–2019: Real Sociedad

Senior career*
Years	Team	Apps	(Gls)
2018–2019	Real Sociedad C	11	(0)
2019–2022	Real Sociedad B	73	(14)
2021–2022	Real Sociedad	13	(2)
2022–2024	Celta	0	(0)
2022–2023	→ RKC Waalwijk (loan)	29	(4)
2023–2024	→ Andorra (loan)	41	(4)
2024–	Málaga	65	(5)

International career^{‡}
2021–	Spain U21	5	(3)
- * Club domestic league appearances and goals as of 3 June 2026 ‡ National team caps and goals as of 7 June 2022

Julen Lobete Cienfuegos (born 18 September 2000) is a Spanish professional footballer who plays as a left winger for Málaga CF.

== Club career ==
=== Real Sociedad ===
Born in Lezo, Gipuzkoa, Basque Country, Lobete joined Real Sociedad's youth setup in 2018, from Antiguoko. He made his senior debut with the C-team on 22 September 2018, coming on as a second-half substitute in a 0–0 Tercera División home draw against Deportivo Alavés B.

Lobete first appeared with the reserves on 7 September 2019, playing 34 minutes in a 2–0 home win over CD Guijuelo in the Segunda División B. He scored his first senior goal late in the month, netting the B's fourth goal in a 5–0 away routing of Barakaldo CF.

Lobete renewed his contract until 2023 on 4 January 2020. He was a regular starter for the B-side during the 2020–21 campaign, scoring seven goals as the side returned to Segunda División after 59 years.

Lobete made his first team – and La Liga – debut on 15 August 2021; after replacing Portu in the 65th minute, he scored his team's first in a 4–2 away loss against FC Barcelona.

=== Celta ===
On 26 July 2022, Lobete signed a four-year contract with RC Celta de Vigo in the top tier. Two days later, he was loaned to Eredivisie side RKC Waalwijk for a season.

On 30 June 2023, Lobete returned to Spain and its second division after agreeing to a one-year loan deal with FC Andorra. On 2 August of the following year, after suffering relegation, he terminated his link with the Galicians.

=== Málaga ===
Hours after leaving Celta, Lobete signed a three-year deal with Málaga CF in division two.
