= Xeber Alkain =

Spanish footballer (born 1997)

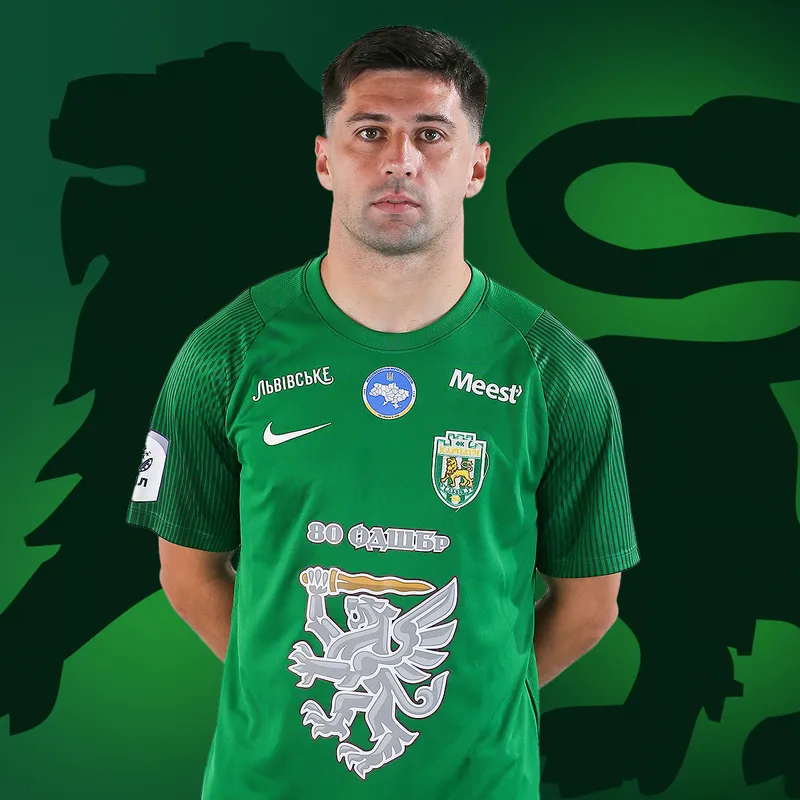

Personal information
- Full name: Xeber Alkain Mitxelena
- Date of birth: 26 June 1997 (age 29)
- Place of birth: Hondarribia, Spain
- Height: 1.74 m (5 ft 9 in)
- Position: Winger

Team information
- Current team: Karpaty Lviv
- Number: 70

Youth career
- Antiguoko

Senior career*
Years	Team	Apps	(Gls)
2016–2019	Real Sociedad C	48	(4)
2019	→ Arenas Getxo (loan)	16	(2)
2019–2022	Real Sociedad B	81	(17)
2022–2024	Alavés	44	(4)
2024–2026	Eibar	45	(1)
2026–	Karpaty Lviv	14	(2)
- * Club domestic league appearances and goals as of 3 June 2026

Xeber Alkain Mitxelena (born 26 June 1997) is a Spanish professional footballer who plays mainly as a right winger for Ukrainian Premier League club Karpaty Lviv.

== Career ==
Born in Hondarribia, Gipuzkoa, Basque Country, Alkain joined Real Sociedad in 2016 from Antiguoko, and was initially assigned to the C-team. On 10 January 2019, after establishing himself as a starter for the C's, he was loaned to Segunda División B side Arenas Club de Getxo for the remainder of the season.

Upon returning, Alkain was assigned to the reserves also in the third division, and renewed his contract until 2021 on 1 July 2020. He was a regular starter during the 2020–21 campaign, scoring five goals as his side returned to Segunda División after 59 years; on 5 July 2021, he extended his link for a further year.

Alkain made his professional debut on 14 August 2021, coming on as a late substitute for Álex Sola in a 1–0 home win over CD Leganés. He scored his first professional goal on 11 September, netting his side's second in a 3–2 home loss against SD Eibar.

Alkain and his teammate Jérémy Blasco left Sanse on 30 May 2022, with their contract expiring in the following month. On 7 June, he signed a three-year deal with Deportivo Alavés, freshly relegated to the second level.

Alkain scored four goals in 36 appearances overall during the 2022–23 season, as the Babazorros achieved promotion to La Liga. He made his debut in the category on 21 August 2023, starting in a 4–3 home win over Sevilla FC.

On 30 July 2024, Alkain agreed to a two-year contract with Eibar in the second division.
