= Rubén Alves =

Brazilian footballer (born 1994)

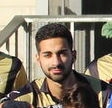
- Alves with Barakaldo in 2017

Personal information
- Full name: Rubén González Alves
- Date of birth: 7 September 1994 (age 32)
- Place of birth: Rio de Janeiro, Brazil
- Height: 1.84 m (6 ft 0 in)
- Position: Centre back

Team information
- Current team: Córdoba
- Number: 16

Youth career
- Santutxu

Senior career*
Years	Team	Apps	(Gls)
2013–2015	Santutxu	50	(3)
2015–2017	Amorebieta	53	(5)
2017–2018	Barakaldo	25	(0)
2018–2019	Atlético Baleares	28	(1)
2019–2022	Ibiza	72	(4)
2022–2024	Racing Santander	60	(2)
2024–2025	Tenerife	9	(1)
2025	→ Córdoba (loan)	10	(2)
2025–	Córdoba	21	(2)
- * Club domestic league appearances and goals as of 6 June 2026

Rubén González Alves (born 7 September 1994) is a Brazilian professional footballer who plays for Córdoba CF. Mainly a central defender, he can also play as a left back.

== Club career ==
Born in Rio de Janeiro to a Basque father and a Brazilian mother, Alves moved to Bilbao, Biscay, Basque Country at nine months of age and was a Santutxu FC youth graduate. After making his senior debut in 2013, he went on to become a regular starter for the side in Tercera División before signing for Segunda División B side SD Amorebieta on 1 July 2015.

On 25 June 2017, Alves agreed to a two-year contract with Barakaldo CF, also in the third division. An immediate first-choice, he moved to fellow league team CD Atlético Baleares on 14 July 2018.

On 19 July 2019, Alves joined UD Ibiza still in division three, on a 1+1 deal. He renewed his contract for a further year on 9 August 2020, and helped the club in their first-ever promotion to Segunda División at the end of the campaign; he extended his link for a further year on 30 June 2021.

Alves made his professional debut at the age of 26 on 13 August 2021, starting in a 0–0 away draw against Real Zaragoza. On 14 June of the following year, he signed a two-year contract with Racing de Santander, recently promoted to the second division.

Alves left Racing on 11 June 2024, after failing to agree new terms, and agreed to a three-year deal with fellow second division side CD Tenerife on 31 July. The following 30 January, however, he moved to Córdoba CF in the same category on loan.

On 7 June 2025, Alves signed a permanent three-year contract with the Blanquiverdes.
