= Enrique Clemente =

Spanish footballer

Personal information
- Full name: Enrique Clemente Maza
- Date of birth: 4 March 1999 (age 27)
- Place of birth: Zaragoza, Spain
- Height: 1.80 m (5 ft 11 in)
- Position: Centre back

Team information
- Current team: Las Palmas
- Number: 5

Youth career
- Zaragoza

Senior career*
Years	Team	Apps	(Gls)
2018–2019	Zaragoza B	8	(0)
2019–2022	Zaragoza	22	(0)
2020–2021	Logroñés (loan)	21	(0)
2022	→ Real Sociedad B (loan)	16	(0)
2022–	Las Palmas	52	(5)
2023–2024	→ Racing Ferrol (loan)	20	(0)
2024–2025	→ Zaragoza (loan)	20	(1)

International career
2017	Spain U18	2	(0)
2019–2020	Spain U21	3	(0)
- * Club domestic league appearances and goals as of 3 June 2026

Enrique Clemente Maza (born 4 March 1999) is a Spanish footballer who plays for UD Las Palmas. Mainly a central defender, he can also play as a left back.

== Club career ==
Born in Zaragoza, Clemente was a Real Zaragoza youth graduate. He made his senior debut with the reserves on 14 January 2018, starting in a 1–2 Segunda División B home loss against Lleida Esportiu.

Clemente was definitely promoted to the B-side in July 2018, after their relegation to Tercera División. In September, he suffered a serious knee injury, being sidelined for the remainder of the season; on 1 October, he extended his contract until 2022, being definitely promoted to the main squad ahead of the 2019–20 campaign.

Clemente made his professional debut on 30 August 2019, playing the full 90 minutes in a 1–0 home win against Elche CF in the Segunda División championship. On 1 October of the following year, he moved to fellow second division side UD Logroñés, on loan for one year.

Clemente scored his first goal as a senior on 1 December 2021, in a Copa del Rey match against CD Mensajero. The following 8 January, he was loaned to fellow second division side Real Sociedad B for the remainder of the season.

On 27 August 2022, Clemente signed a contract with fellow second level team UD Las Palmas. On 1 August of the following year, after achieving promotion to La Liga, he renewed his contract until 2026 and was immediately loaned to Racing de Ferrol, newly-promoted to the second division.

On 27 August 2024, Clemente returned to his first club Zaragoza on a one-year loan deal.
