= Jérémy Blasco =

French footballer (born 1999)

Personal information
- Full name: Jérémy Damien Blasco
- Date of birth: 12 February 1999 (age 27)
- Place of birth: Bayonne, France
- Height: 1.85 m (6 ft 1 in)
- Position: Defender

Team information
- Current team: Ibiza (on loan from Radomiak Radom)
- Number: 5

Youth career
- 2004–2010: Bayonne
- 2010–2017: Real Sociedad

Senior career*
Years	Team	Apps	(Gls)
2017–2019	Real Sociedad C	48	(3)
2019–2022	Real Sociedad B	78	(4)
2022–2025	Huesca	91	(2)
2025–	Radomiak Radom	17	(1)
2026–	→ Ibiza (loan)	0	(0)
- * Club domestic league appearances and goals as of 12:22, 5 September 2026 (UTC)

Jérémy Damien Blasco (born 12 February 1999) is a French professional footballer who plays as either a central defender or a right back for Primera Federación club Ibiza, on loan from Radomiak Radom.

== Club career ==
Born in Bayonne, Blasco began his career with hometown side Aviron Bayonnais at the age of five, before joining Real Sociedad's youth setup in 2010. He made his senior debut with the C-team on 11 March 2017, starting in a 1–0 Tercera División away win against Deportivo Alavés B.

Blasco scored his first senior goal on 1 October 2017, netting the C's second in a 3–2 home win over Alavés B. He first appeared with the reserves on 17 March 2019, playing the full 90 minutes in a 0–1 away loss against Gimnástica de Torrelavega in the Segunda División B.

On 1 July 2020, Blasco renewed his contract until 2022, and contributed with 15 appearances during the campaign as Sanse achieved promotion to Segunda División. He made his professional debut on 14 August 2021, starting in a 1–0 home win over CD Leganés.

Blasco and his teammate Xeber Alkain left Sanse on 30 May 2022, with their contract expiring in the following month. On 8 July, he moved to second division side SD Huesca on a two-year deal.

On 21 June 2025, Blasco left Spain after 15 years and agreed to a three-year contract with Polish side Radomiak Radom.

On 1 September 2026, Blasco returned to Spain, joining third-tier side Ibiza on loan for the rest of the season.
