= Álex Sola =

Spanish footballer (born 1999)

Personal information
- Full name: Alejandro Sola López-Ocaña
- Date of birth: 9 June 1999 (age 27)
- Place of birth: San Sebastián, Spain
- Height: 1.78 m (5 ft 10 in)
- Positions: Right back; winger

Team information
- Current team: Almería

Youth career
- Real Sociedad

Senior career*
Years	Team	Apps	(Gls)
2017–2022	Real Sociedad B	76	(4)
2019–2024	Real Sociedad	15	(0)
2019–2020	→ Numancia (loan)	31	(1)
2023–2024	→ Alavés (loan)	29	(0)
2024–2025	Getafe	20	(0)
2025–2026	Granada	36	(3)
2026–	Almería	0	(0)

International career^{‡}
2016	Spain U17	1	(0)
2024–	Basque Country	1	(0)
- * Club domestic league appearances and goals as of 9 June 2026 ‡ National team caps and goals as of 24 March 2024

Alejandro "Álex" Sola López-Ocaña (born 9 June 1999), sometimes known as Álex Ujía, is a Spanish professional footballer who plays as either a right back or a right winger for UD Almería.

== Club career ==
Sola was born in San Sebastián, Gipuzkoa, Basque Country, and represented Real Sociedad as a youth. He made his senior debut with the reserves on 9 April 2017, starting in a 0–0 Segunda División B home draw against Sestao River Club.

Sola was promoted to the B-team ahead of the 2017–18 campaign, and appeared regularly afterwards. He made his first team – and La Liga – debut on 16 February 2019, playing the full 90 minutes in a 3–0 home defeat of CD Leganés.

On 14 August 2019, Sola renewed his contract with the Txuri-urdin until 2023, and was immediately loaned to Segunda División side CD Numancia for one year. He scored his first professional goal the following 22 February, netting the opener in a 2–1 loss at Albacete Balompié.

Sola suffered a knee injury in July 2020, making a come back the following April before being sidelined again in August. He returned to action in January 2022, subsequently becoming a regular starter for Sanse before renewing his contract until 2026, on 12 May.

On 2 August 2022, Sola was promoted to Real Sociedad's first team, being assigned the number 2 jersey. On 1 September 2023, after the arrival of Álvaro Odriozola, he was loaned to fellow top tier side Deportivo Alavés for the 2023–24 season.

On 15 July 2024, Sola signed a three-year contract with Getafe CF also in the first division. On 1 September of the following year, he terminated his link with the club, and joined second division side Granada CF on a one-year deal just hours later.

On 7 July 2026, Sola agreed to a four-year contract with UD Almería in division two.

== International career ==
Sola represented Spain at under-17 level in 2016, and also featured for the Basque Country national team in 2024, in a friendly against Uruguay.

== Honours ==
Individual

- La Liga Play of the Month: February 2024 (with Samu Omorodion)
