= Lezo, Spain =

Lezo
- Municipality
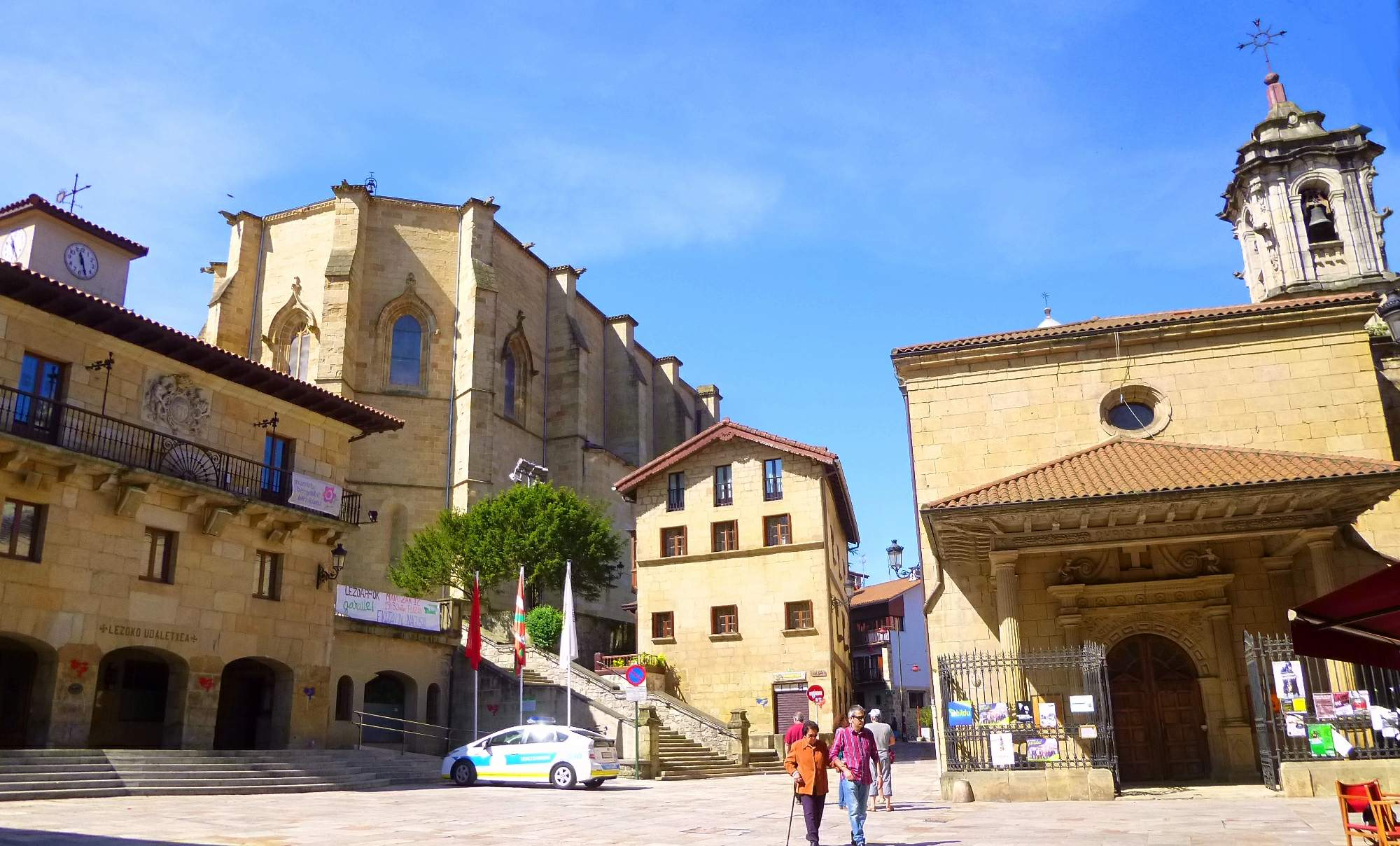

- Coat of arms

- Location of Lezo within the Basque Country
- Coordinates: 43°19′N 1°54′W
- Country: Spain
- Autonomous community: Basque Country
- Province: Gipuzkoa
- Eskualdea: Donostialdea
- Founded: 1202

Government
  - Mayor: Ainhoa Zabalo Loyarte (EH Bildu)

Area
  - Total: 12.94 km^{2} (5.00 sq mi)
- Elevation: 18 m (59 ft)

Population (2025-01-01)
  - Total: 6,184
  - Density: 477.9/km^{2} (1,238/sq mi)
- Time zone: UTC+1 (CET)
  - Summer (DST): UTC+2 (CEST)
- Postal code: 20100
- Official language(s): Basque, Spanish
- Website: Official website

Lezo is a town located in the province of Gipuzkoa, in the autonomous community of Basque Country, northern Spain.
