= Polideportivo Ejido B =

Poli Ejido B
- Full name: Club Polideportivo Ejido "B"
- Nickname(s): Poli
- Founded: 1996
- Dissolved: 2010
- Ground: Santo Domingo; El Ejido, Andalusia, Spain
- Capacity: 7,870
- 2008–09: 3ª - Group 9, 7th
Home colours	Away colours

Club Polideportivo Ejido "B" was a Spanish football team from El Ejido, in Almería, Andalusia. Founded in 1996, it was the reserve team of Polideportivo Ejido. The reserve team was dissolved due to the bad general situation of the club.

== Season to season ==
Season	Tier	Division	Place
1996–97	6	1ª Reg.	8th
1997–98	6	1ª Reg.	4th
1998–99	5	Reg. Pref.	7th
1999–2000	5	Reg. Pref.	14th
2000–01	5	Reg. Pref.	1st
2001–02	5	Reg. Pref.	4th
2002–03	5	Reg. Pref.	3rd

Season	Tier	Division	Place
2003–04	5	Reg. Pref.	3rd
2004–05	5	1ª And.	6th
2005–06	5	1ª And.	1st
2006–07	4	3ª	3rd
2007–08	4	3ª	5th
2008–09	4	3ª	7th
2009–10	4	3ª	(R)

- 4 seasons in Tercera División
