= 2020–21 SD Huesca season =

SD Huesca
2020–21 season
- Owner: Fundación Alcoraz
- President: Agustín Lasaosa
- Head coach: Míchel (until 12 January); Pacheta (from 12 January)
- Stadium: El Alcoraz
- La Liga: 18th (relegated)
- Copa del Rey: Second round
- Top goalscorer: League: Rafa Mir (13); All: Rafa Mir (16)
- Biggest win: Valladolid 1–3 Huesca; Huesca 3–1 Elche
- Biggest defeat: Real Sociedad 4–1 Huesca; Real Madrid 4–1 Huesca; Barcelona 4–1 Huesca
colours	Away colours	Third colours

The 2020–21 season was the 61st season in the existence of SD Huesca and the club's first season back in the top flight of Spanish football, and second overall in their history. In addition to the domestic league, SD Huesca participated in this season's edition of the Copa del Rey. The season covered the period from 21 July 2020 to 30 June 2021, with the late start to the season due to the COVID-19 pandemic in Spain.

== Players ==
=== First-team squad ===
As of 1 February 2021.

Note: Flags indicate national team as defined under FIFA eligibility rules; some limited exceptions apply. Players may hold more than one non-FIFA nationality.

No.	Pos.	Nation	Player
1	GK	ESP	Álvaro Fernández
2	MF	CIV	Idrissa Doumbia (on loan from Sporting CP)
3	DF	ESP	Pablo Maffeo (on loan from VfB Stuttgart)
4	DF	ESP	Pablo Insua
5	MF	ESP	Pedro Mosquera
6	FW	ESP	Sandro Ramírez
7	MF	ESP	David Ferreiro
8	MF	ESP	Eugeni
9	FW	ESP	Rafa Mir (on loan from Wolverhampton Wanderers)
10	MF	ESP	Sergio Gómez (on loan from Borussia Dortmund)
11	DF	ESP	Javi Galán
12	FW	JPN	Shinji Okazaki
13	GK	ESP	Andrés Fernández
14	DF	ESP	Jorge Pulido (captain)

No.	Pos.	Nation	Player
15	MF	ESP	Javi Ontiveros (on loan from Villarreal)
16	DF	POR	Luisinho
17	MF	ESP	Mikel Rico
18	DF	GRE	Dimitris Siovas
19	DF	ESP	Pedro López
20	MF	ESP	Jaime Seoane
21	MF	ESP	Juan Carlos
22	DF	URU	Gastón Silva
23	FW	ESP	Dani Escriche
24	MF	ESP	Borja García
25	DF	SVK	Denis Vavro (on loan from Lazio)
30	GK	ESP	Antonio Valera

=== Other players under contract ===
Note: Flags indicate national team as defined under FIFA eligibility rules; some limited exceptions apply. Players may hold more than one non-FIFA nationality.

No.	Pos.	Nation	Player
—	MF	ARG	Damián Musto

=== Reserve team ===
Note: Flags indicate national team as defined under FIFA eligibility rules; some limited exceptions apply. Players may hold more than one non-FIFA nationality.

No.	Pos.	Nation	Player
27	FW	ESP	Kevin Carlos
28	DF	ESP	Manuel Galán

No.	Pos.	Nation	Player
31	FW	ESP	Gustavo Abizanda

=== Out on loan ===
Note: Flags indicate national team as defined under FIFA eligibility rules; some limited exceptions apply. Players may hold more than one non-FIFA nationality.

No.	Pos.	Nation	Player
—	MF	ESP	Joaquín Muñoz (on loan at Málaga until 30 June 2021)
—	MF	CIV	Ronald Gbizie (on loan at Numancia until 30 June 2021)

No.	Pos.	Nation	Player
—	MF	NGR	Kelechi Nwakali (on loan at Alcorcón until 30 June 2021)
—	FW	COL	Juan Peñaloza (on loan at Racing Ferrol until 30 June 2021)

== Transfers ==
=== In ===
Date	Player	From	Type	Fee	Ref
21 July 2020	(Spain) Joaquín Muñoz	Mirandés	Loan return		
21 July 2020	(Spain) Jaime Seoane	Lugo	Loan return		
27 July 2020	(Turkey) Serdar Gürler	(Turkey) Göztepe	Loan return		
4 August 2020	(Spain) Pablo Insua	(Germany) Schalke 04	Buyout clause	Undisclosed	
8 August 2020	(Serbia) Aleksandar Jovanović	Deportivo La Coruña	Loan return		
24 August 2020	(Spain) Dani Escriche	Elche	Loan return		

=== Out ===
Date	Player	To	Type	Fee	Ref
21 July 2020	(Croatia) Toni Datković	(Croatia) Lokomotiva	Loan return		
21 July 2020	(Ivory Coast) Cheick Doukouré	Levante	Loan return		
21 July 2020	(Spain) Cristo González	(Italy) Udinese	Loan return		
21 July 2020	(Spain) Jordi Mboula	(France) Monaco	Loan return		
21 July 2020	(Spain) Miguelón	Villarreal	Loan return		
21 July 2020	(Spain) Dani Raba	Villarreal	Loan return		
21 July 2020	(Portugal) Josué Sá	(Belgium) Anderlecht	Loan return		
21 July 2020	(Spain) Rubén Yáñez	Getafe	Loan return		
7 August 2020	(Turkey) Serdar Gürler	(Turkey) Antalyaspor	Transfer	Undisclosed	
31 January 2021	(Nigeria) Kelechi Nwakali	Alcorcón	Loan		

== Pre-season and friendlies ==
Win Draw Loss

22 August 2020 Friendly	Espanyol	1–1	Huesca	Sant Adrià de Besòs, Spain
19:30 CEST (UTC+2)	Melendo 21'	Report	Pulido 35'	Stadium: Ciutat Esportiva Dani Jarque

26 August 2020 Friendly	Alavés	1–2	Huesca	Vitoria-Gasteiz, Spain
19:00 CEST (UTC+2)	Joselu 5'	Report	Okazaki 8'; Mir 62'	Stadium: Ciudad Deportiva José Luis Compañón

29 August 2020 Friendly	Real Sociedad	2–2	Huesca	Zubieta, Spain
18:00 CEST (UTC+2)	Merino 47'; Bautista 88'		Juan Carlos 33'; Mir 69' (pen.)	Stadium: Campo José Luis Orbegozo; Attendance: 0 Referee: Rezola Etxeberria

4 September 2020 Friendly	Huesca	3–0	Sabadell	Villacañas, Spain
18:00 CEST (UTC+2)				Stadium: Campo De Fútbol Las Pirámides

== Competitions ==
=== Overall record ===
Competition	First match	Last match	Starting round	Final position	Record							
Competition	First match	Last match	Starting round	Final position	Pld	W	D	L	GF	GA	GD	Win %
La Liga	13 September 2020	22 May 2021	Matchday 1	18th	38	7	13	18	34	53	−19	18.42
Copa del Rey	15 December 2020	7 January 2021	First round	Second round	2	1	0	1	4	4	+0	50.00
Total					40	8	13	19	38	57	−19	20.00

Source: Soccerway

=== La Liga ===
==== League table ====
Pos	Team	Pld	W	D	L	GF	GA	GD	Pts	Qualification or relegation
16	Alavés	38	9	11	18	36	57	−21	38	
17	Elche	38	8	12	18	34	55	−21	36	
18	Huesca (R)	38	7	13	18	34	53	−19	34	Relegation to Segunda División
19	Valladolid (R)	38	5	16	17	34	57	−23	31	Relegation to Segunda División
20	Eibar (R)	38	6	12	20	29	52	−23	30	Relegation to Segunda División

Source: La Liga
Rules for classification: 1) Points; 2) Head-to-head points; 3) Head-to-head goal difference; 4) Goal difference; 5) Goals scored; 6) Fair-play points (Note: Head-to-head record is used only after all the matches between the teams in question have been played)
(R) Relegated

==== Results summary ====
Overall								Home						Away					
Pld	W	D	L	GF	GA	GD	Pts	W	D	L	GF	GA	GD	W	D	L	GF	GA	GD
38	7	13	18	34	53	−19	34	5	7	7	17	21	−4	2	6	11	17	32	−15

Source: La Liga

==== Results by round ====
Round	1	2	3	4	5	6	7	8	9	10	11	12	13	14	15	16	17	18	19	20	21	22	23	24	25	26	27	28	29	30	31	32	33	34	35	36	37	38
Ground	A	H	A	H	A	H	A	A	H	A	H	A	H	A	H	A	H	H	A	H	A	H	A	H	A	H	A	H	A	H	A	H	A	H	A	H	A	H
Result	D	L	D	D	D	D	L	L	D	D	L	D	W	L	D	L	L	L	L	D	W	L	L	W	D	L	L	D	W	W	L	L	L	W	L	W	L	D
Position	8	13	17	16	15	15	18	19	20	19	20	20	19	19	19	20	20	20	20	20	20	20	20	20	20	20	20	20	18	16	18	19	19	18	18	17	17	18

Source: La Liga
A = Away; H = Home; W = Win; D = Draw; L = Loss

==== Matches ====
The league fixtures were announced on 31 August 2020.

13 September 2020 1	Villarreal	1–1	Huesca	Villarreal
18:30 CEST (UTC+2)	Pedraza (yellow card) 36'; Gerard 68' (pen.)	Report	Maffeo 42'; Mosquera (yellow card) 88'	Stadium: Estadio de la Cerámica; Attendance: 0 (Note: The match was played behind closed doors due to the COVID-19 pandemic in Spain.); Referee: Xavier Estrada Fernández

20 September 2020 2	Huesca	0–2	Cádiz	Huesca
16:00 CEST (UTC+2)	Pulido (yellow card) 16'; Ferreiro (yellow card) 50'; Siovas (yellow card) 76'	Report	Negredo 11'; Cala (yellow card) 29'; Espino (yellow card) 58'; Pombo (yellow card) 64', (goal) 83'	Stadium: El Alcoraz; Attendance: 0 Referee: César Soto Grado

26 September 2020 3	Valencia	1–1	Huesca	Valencia
16:00 CEST (UTC+2)	Wass 38'	Report	Siovas 63'; Galán (yellow card) 64'	Stadium: Mestalla; Attendance: 0 Referee: José Luis Munuera Montero

30 September 2020 4	Huesca	0–0	Atlético Madrid	Huesca
19:00 CEST (UTC+2)	Galán (yellow card) 80'	Report		Stadium: El Alcoraz; Attendance: 0 Referee: Adrián Cordero Vega

3 October 2020 5	Elche	0–0	Huesca	Elche
18:30 CEST (UTC+2)		Report	Insua (yellow card) 43'; Pulido (yellow card) 59'	Stadium: Estadio Manuel Martínez Valero; Attendance: 0 Referee: Mario Melero López

18 October 2020 6	Huesca	2–2	Valladolid	Huesca
18:30 CEST (UTC+2)	Mir 53'; Sandro 56'; Maffeo (yellow card) 73'	Report	Bruno (yellow card) 12', (goal) 35'; Rubio 51' (pen.); Joaquín (yellow card) 89'	Stadium: El Alcoraz; Attendance: 0 Referee: Jorge Figueroa Vázquez

25 October 2020 7	Real Sociedad	4–1	Huesca	San Sebastián
21:00 CET (UTC+1)	Elustondo (yellow card) 23'; Oyarzabal 35' (pen.), 54', (yellow card) 64'; Portu 68'; Isak 75'	Report	Mir 46'; Escriche (yellow card) 60'	Stadium: Anoeta; Attendance: 0 Referee: Isidro Díaz de Mera Escuderos

31 October 2020 8	Real Madrid	4–1	Huesca	Madrid
14:00 CET (UTC+1)	Hazard 40'; Benzema 45', 90'; Valverde 54'	Report	Ferreiro 74'; Siovas (yellow card) 79'; Sandro (yellow card) 88'	Stadium: Alfredo Di Stéfano; Attendance: 0 Referee: Pablo González Fuertes

7 November 2020 9	Huesca	1–1	Eibar	Huesca
14:00 CET (UTC+1)	Mir 67'; Insua (yellow card) 89'; Doumbia (yellow card) 90+3'	Report	Burgos 38'	Stadium: El Alcoraz; Attendance: 0 Referee: Mario Melero López

20 November 2020 10	Osasuna	1–1	Huesca	Pamplona
21:00 CET (UTC+1)	Budimir (yellow card) 41'; D. García 68'; Pérez (yellow card) 75'	Report	Sandro 5'; Insua (yellow card) 21'; López (yellow card) 74'; Nwakali (yellow card) 90+2'	Stadium: El Sadar Stadium; Attendance: 0 Referee: Valentín Pizarro Gómez

28 November 2020 11	Huesca	0–1	Sevilla	Huesca
18:30 CET (UTC+1)	Seoane (yellow card) 53'; Maffeo (yellow card) 60'; Okazaki (yellow card) 85'; Insua (yellow card) 88'	Report	Rekik (yellow card) 23'; Jordán (yellow card) 58'; Torres (yellow card) 70'; En-Nesyri 83'	Stadium: El Alcoraz; Attendance: 0 Referee: Guillermo Cuadra Fernández

6 December 2020 12	Granada	3–3	Huesca	Granada
14:00 CET (UTC+1)	Foulquier (yellow card) 31'; Suárez 43'; Germán (yellow card) 56', (goal) 90'; Molina 88'	Report	Rico 21'; García 49'; Okazaki 82'	Stadium: Nuevo Los Cármenes; Attendance: 0 Referee: Javier Alberola Rojas

12 December 2020 13	Huesca	1–0	Alavés	Huesca
18:30 CET (UTC+1)	Ontiveros (yellow card) 58', (goal) 66'	Report	Duarte (yellow card) 37'; Jota (yellow card) 52'; Tachi (yellow card) 70'; Joselu (yellow card) 83'	Stadium: El Alcoraz; Attendance: 0 Referee: Mario Melero López

18 December 2020 14	Athletic Bilbao	2–0	Huesca	Bilbao
21:00 CET (UTC+1)	Kodro 86' (pen.); Núñez 90+2'	Report	Pulido (yellow card) 36' (yellow-red card) 86'; Doumbia (yellow card) 67'	Stadium: San Mamés Stadium; Attendance: 0 Referee: Valentín Pizarro Gómez

22 December 2020 15	Huesca	1–1	Levante	Huesca
19:45 CET (UTC+1)	Ontiveros 31' (pen.); López (yellow card) 69'; Insua (yellow card) 80'	Report	Vezo (yellow card) 30'; Róber (yellow card) 39'; Melero 53'; Rochina (yellow card) 90+1'	Stadium: El Alcoraz; Attendance: 0 Referee: Isidro Díaz de Mera

30 December 2020 16	Celta Vigo	2–1	Huesca	Vigo
19:15 CET (UTC+1)	Nolito 33'; Suárez (yellow card) 37'; Aspas 61'; Mallo (yellow card) 90+6'	Report	Seoane 84'	Stadium: Balaídos; Attendance: 0 Referee: José Luis Munuera Montero

3 January 2021 17	Huesca	0–1	Barcelona	Huesca
21:00 CET (UTC+1)	Ontiveros (yellow card) 84'	Report	De Jong 27'	Stadium: El Alcoraz; Attendance: 0 Referee: Guillermo Cuadra Fernández

11 January 2021 18	Huesca	0–2	Real Betis	Huesca
21:00 CET (UTC+1)	Ontiveros (yellow card) 56'; Insua (yellow card) 85'	Report	Akouokou (yellow card) 51' (yellow-red card) 82'; Mandi 78'; Sanabria 90+4'	Stadium: El Alcoraz; Attendance: 0 Referee: Adrián Cordero Vega

20 January 2021 19	Getafe	1–0	Huesca	Getafe
19:00 CET (UTC+1)	Nyom (yellow card) 7'; Mata (yellow card) 41'; Arambarri 69'	Report	Mir (yellow card) 29'; Ontiveros (yellow card) 62'; Seoane (yellow card) 90+6'; Siovas (yellow card) 90+7'	Stadium: Coliseum Alfonso Pérez; Attendance: 0 Referee: David Medié Jiménez

23 January 2021 20	Huesca	0–0	Villarreal	Huesca
14:00 CET (UTC+1)	Ontiveros (yellow card) 34'; Escriche (yellow card) 55'; Luisinho (yellow card) 89'	Report	Capoue (yellow card) 73'	Stadium: El Alcoraz; Attendance: 0 Referee: Javier Alberola Rojas

29 January 2021 21	Valladolid	1–3	Huesca	Valladolid
21:00 CET (UTC+1)	Míchel (yellow card) 33'; Nacho (yellow card) 64'; Toni 90+3'	Report	Silva (yellow card) 23'; Doumbia (yellow card) 30'; Mir 37', 50', 57'	Stadium: José Zorrilla; Attendance: 0 Referee: Juan Martínez Munuera

6 February 2021 22	Huesca	1–2	Real Madrid	Huesca
16:15 CET (UTC+1)	Maffeo (yellow card) 45'; Galán 48'; Silva (yellow card) 53'	Report	Kroos (yellow card) 32'; Varane 55', 84'	Stadium: El Alcoraz; Attendance: 0 Referee: Xavier Estrada Fernández

13 February 2021 23	Sevilla	1–0	Huesca	Seville
16:15 CET (UTC+1)	Munir 57'; De Jong (yellow card) 63'; En-Nesyri (yellow card) 87'; Bono (yellow card) 90'	Report	Doumbia (yellow card) 40'; Mir (yellow card) 51'; Galán (yellow card) 63'; Insua (yellow card) 80'	Stadium: Ramón Sánchez Pizjuán; Attendance: 0 Referee: David Medié Jiménez

21 February 2021 24	Huesca	3–2	Granada	Huesca
18:30 CET (UTC+1)	Mir (penalty missed) 16'; Escriche 31'; Pulido 39'; Foulquier 44' (o.g.); Rico (yellow card) 51'; Insua (yellow card) 73'; Seoane (yellow card) 90+3'	Report	Quina 8'; Silva (yellow card) 15'; Soro 59'; Pérez (yellow card) 61'; Díaz (yellow card) 81'; Germán (red card) 90+1'	Stadium: El Alcoraz; Attendance: 0 Referee: César Soto Grado

27 February 2021 25	Eibar	1–1	Huesca	Eibar
14:00 CET (UTC+1)	José Ángel (yellow card) 60'; León (yellow card) 73'; Diop 83'	Report	Galán (yellow card) 36'; Maffeo (yellow card) 40'; Sandro 81'	Stadium: Ipurua; Attendance: 0 Referee: Pablo González Fuertes

7 March 2021 26	Huesca	3–4	Celta Vigo	Huesca
14:00 CET (UTC+1)	Siovas 14'; Mir 16'; Ferreiro 74'	Report	Mina 5'; Nolito 37'; Mallo 52', (yellow card) 57'; Beltrán 76'; Ferreyra (yellow card) 88'	Stadium: El Alcoraz; Attendance: 0 Referee: José Luis Munuera Montero

15 March 2021 27	Barcelona	4–1	Huesca	Barcelona
21:00 CET (UTC+1)	Messi 13', 90'; Griezmann 35'; Mingueza 53'	Report	Mir 45+4' (pen.); Escriche (yellow card) 48'; Insua (yellow card) 61'	Stadium: Camp Nou; Attendance: 0 Referee: Adrián Cordero Vega

20 March 2021 28	Huesca	0–0	Osasuna	Huesca
18:30 CET (UTC+1)	Siovas (yellow card) 39'	Report	Moncayola (yellow card) 61'; Vidal (yellow card) 66'	Stadium: El Alcoraz; Attendance: 0 Referee: Carlos del Cerro Grande

2 April 2021 29	Levante	0–2	Huesca	Valencia
21:00 CEST (UTC+2)	Son (yellow card) 34'; Rochina (yellow card) 60'	Report	Pulido (yellow card) 14'; Mir 15', 54'; Seoane (yellow card) 49'	Stadium: Ciutat de València; Attendance: 0 Referee: Jorge Figueroa Vázquez

9 April 2021 30	Huesca	3–1	Elche	Huesca
21:00 CEST (UTC+2)	Mir 3', 88' (pen.); Sandro 30'; Gómez (yellow card) 60'; Ferreiro (yellow card) 71'	Report	Vavro 4' (o.g.); Fidel (yellow card) 52'; Gonzalo (yellow card) 90+3'	Stadium: El Alcoraz; Attendance: 0 Referee: Javier Alberola Rojas

18 April 2021 33	Alavés	1–0	Huesca	Vitoria-Gasteiz
16:15 CEST (UTC+2)	Battaglia (yellow card) 60', (goal) 85'	Report	Vavro (yellow card) 30'; Escriche (yellow card) 84'	Stadium: Mendizorrotza; Attendance: 0 Referee: Alejandro Hernández Hernández
Note: The match was originally scheduled for 28 April 2021, but was brought forward by La Liga.

22 April 2021 31	Atlético Madrid	2–0	Huesca	Madrid
19:00 CEST (UTC+2)	Correa 39'; Giménez (yellow card) 65'; Carrasco 80'; Saúl (yellow card) 83'	Report		Stadium: Wanda Metropolitano; Attendance: 0 Referee: José Luis Munuera Montero

25 April 2021 32	Huesca	0–2	Getafe	Huesca
14:00 CEST (UTC+2)	Ferreiro (yellow card) 40'; Escriche (yellow card) 49'	Report	Ünal 20', 52', (yellow card) 54'; Arambarri (yellow card) 71'; Iglesias (yellow card) 90+2'; Suárez (yellow card) 90+3'	Stadium: El Alcoraz; Attendance: 0 Referee: Juan Martínez Munuera

1 May 2021 34	Huesca	1–0	Real Sociedad	Huesca
18:30 CEST (UTC+2)	Seoane (yellow card) 76'; Sandro 86'; Pulido (yellow card) 89'	Report	Gorosabel (yellow card) 52'; Zaldúa (yellow card) 86'	Stadium: El Alcoraz; Attendance: 0 Referee: Antonio Mateu Lahoz

8 May 2021 35	Cádiz	2–1	Huesca	Cádiz
18:30 CEST (UTC+2)	Marcos Mauro 43'; Silva 45+2' (o.g.); José Mari (yellow card) 49'; Jønsson (yellow card) 61'; Carcelén (yellow card) 79'; Fali (yellow card) 90+1'	Report	Mir 45+1'	Stadium: Ramón de Carranza; Attendance: 0 Referee: Alejandro Hernández Hernández

12 May 2021 36	Huesca	1–0	Athletic Bilbao	Huesca
20:00 CEST (UTC+2)	Sandro 61'	Report	Simón (yellow card) 62'	Stadium: El Alcoraz; Attendance: 0 Referee: Jorge Figueroa Vázquez

16 May 2021 37	Real Betis	1–0	Huesca	Seville
18:30 CEST (UTC+2)	Iglesias 57' (pen.); Lainez (yellow card) 88'	Report	Rico (yellow card) 17'; Galán (yellow card) 28'; Siovas (yellow card) 59'; Sandro (yellow card) 68'; Ferreiro (yellow card) 86'; Escriche (red card) 90+4'	Stadium: Benito Villamarín; Attendance: 0 Referee: Pablo González Fuertes

22 May 2021 38	Huesca	0–0	Valencia	Huesca
18:00 CEST (UTC+2)	Ferreiro (yellow card) 34'; Siovas (yellow card) 55'	Report	Guillamón (yellow card) 20'	Stadium: El Alcoraz; Attendance: 0 Referee: Guillermo Cuadra Fernández

=== Copa del Rey ===
15 December 2020 First round	Marchamalo	2–3 (a.e.t.)	Huesca	Marchamalo
19:00 CET (UTC+1)	Fernández 64'; Cerro 118'	Report	Mir 9', 94', 111'	Stadium: La Solana; Referee: José Luis Munuera Montero

7 January 2021 Second round	Alcoyano	2–1	Huesca	Alcoy
21:00 CET (UTC+1)	Mourad 16'; Jony (penalty missed) 66'; Moltó 85'	Report	Seoane 38'	Stadium: El Collao; Referee: Jorge Figueroa Vázquez

== Statistics ==
=== Goalscorers ===
As of 12 April 2021

Rank	No.	Pos	Nat	Name	La Liga	Copa del Rey	Total
1	9	FW	(Spain)	Rafa Mir	12	3	15
2	6	FW	(Spain)	Sandro Ramírez	4	0	4
3	15	MF	(Spain)	Javi Ontiveros	2	0	2
3	18	DF	(Greece)	Dimitris Siovas	2	0	2
3	20	MF	(Spain)	Jaime Seoane	1	1	2
4	3	DF	(Spain)	Pablo Maffeo	1	0	1
4	7	MF	(Spain)	David Ferreiro	1	0	1
4	17	MF	(Spain)	Mikel Rico	1	0	1
4	24	MF	(Spain)	Borja García	1	0	1
4	12	FW	(Japan)	Shinji Okazaki	1	0	1
Own goals					2	0	2
Totals					31	4	35
