= 2018–19 SD Huesca season =

Huesca
2018–19 season
- President: Agustín Lasaosa
- Head coach: Leo Franco (until 9 October 2018); Francisco (from 10 October 2018)
- Stadium: El Alcoraz
- La Liga: 19th (relegated)
- Copa del Rey: Round of 32
- Top goalscorer: League: Chimy Ávila (8); All: Chimy Ávila (8)
- Highest home attendance: 7,341 vs Real Madrid (9 December 2018)
- Lowest home attendance: 6,052 vs Valladolid (1 February 2019)
- Average home league attendance: 6,563 (including Copa del Rey)
Home colours	Away colours	Third colours

The 2018–19 season is Sociedad Deportiva Huesca's inaugural season in the Spanish top-flight after achieving a historic promotion in the previous season in Segunda División.

== Squad ==
=== Current squad/Statistics ===
No	Pos	Name	Age	La Liga				Copa del Rey				Since	Signed from	Notes
No	Pos	Name	Age	Apps	Goal	Booked	Sent off (straight red)	Apps	Goal	Booked	Sent off (straight red)	Since	Signed from	Notes
Goalkeepers
1	GK	(Spain) Javi Varas	44	0	0	0	0	0	0	0	0	2019 (Winter)	Granada
13	GK	(Spain) Roberto Santamaría	41	0	0	0	0	0	0	0	0	2018 (Winter)	Reus
25	GK	(Serbia) Aleksandar Jovanović	33	6	0	0	0	0	0	0	0	2018	(Denmark) AGF Aarhus
Defenders
3	CB	(Spain) Xabier Etxeita	38	7+1	1	0	0	0	0	0	0	2018	Athletic Bilbao (on loan)
4	CB	(Spain) Adrián Diéguez	30	0	0	0	0	0	0	0	0	2019 (Winter)	Alavés (on loan)
12	LB	(Spain) Javi Galán	31	0	0	0	0	0	0	0	0	2019 (Winter)	Córdoba
14	CB	(Spain) Jorge Pulido	35	11	1	1	0	0	0	0	0	2017	(Belgium) Sint-Truiden
15	CB/RB	(Equatorial Guinea) Carlos Akapo	33	5+1	0	1	0	0	0	0	0	2016	Valencia B
16	LB	(Portugal) Luisinho	41	6	0	3	0	0	0	0	0	2018	Deportivo La Coruña	Source
18	CB	(Spain) Pablo Insua	33	1	0	0	0	0	0	0	0	2018	(Germany) Schalke 04 (on loan)	Source
24	RB/CM	(Spain) Jorge Miramón	37	12	1	3	0	0	0	0	0	2018	Reus
Midfielders
5	CM	(Spain) Juan Aguilera	41	3+1	0	0	0	0	0	0	0	2016	(India) Mumbai City
6	AM	(Spain) Moi Gómez	32	10+1	1	0	0	0	0	0	0	2018	Sporting Gijón (on loan)
7	MF	(Spain) David Ferreiro	38	6+5	0	3	0	0	0	0	0	2016	Lugo
8	CM	(Spain) Gonzalo Melero (C)	32	6+1	1	0	0	0	0	0	0	2016	Ponferradina
10	AM	(Spain) Juanjo Camacho	46	0	0	0	0	0	0	0	0	2008	Vecindario
11	FW/LW	(Spain) Álex Gallar	34	7+5	3	2	0	0	0	0	0	2017	Cultural Leonesa
17	DM	(Spain) Christian Rivera	29	0+1	0	0	0	0	0	0	0	2018	Las Palmas (on loan)
20	AM	(Venezuela) Juanpi	32	0	0	0	0	0	0	0	0	2019 (Winter)	Málaga (on loan)
21	MF	(Venezuela) Yangel Herrera	28	0	0	0	0	0	0	0	0	2019 (Winter)	(England) Manchester City (on loan)
23	MF	(Argentina) Damián Musto	39	10	0	7	0	0	0	0	0	2018	(Mexico) Tijuana (on loan)
Forwards
9	FW	(Colombia) Cucho Hernández	27	10+2	1	2	0	0	0	0	0	2017	(England) Watford (on loan)
19	AM	(Argentina) Chimy Ávila	32	4+6	1	4	0	0	0	0	0	2017	(Argentina) San Lorenzo (on loan)
22	ST	(Spain) Enric Gallego	40	0	0	0	0	0	0	0	0	2019 (Winter)	Extremadura
Players who have made an appearance, but have left the club
21	RW	(Turkey) Serdar Gürler	35	5+4	0	2	0	0	0	0	0	2018	(Turkey) Osmanlıspor
22	DM	(Spain) Lluís Sastre	40	1	0	0	0	0	0	0	0	2017	Leganés
12	ST	(Italy) Samuele Longo	34	6+5	0	2	0	0	0	0	0	2018	(Italy) Internazionale (on loan)
4	CB/DM	(Portugal) Rúben Semedo	32	9+2	0	4	0	0	0	0	0	2018	Villarreal (on loan)
20	LB	(Serbia) Rajko Brežančić	37	0+1	0	0	0	0	0	0	0	2016	(Netherlands) AZ
1	GK	(Argentina) Axel Werner	30	6	0	0	0	0	0	0	0	2018	Atlético Madrid (on loan)

Last updated: 16 January 2019
Source: First Team Statistics

=== Players in ===
No	Pos	Name	Age	Moving from	Type	Fee	Transfer window	Source
—	FW	(Colombia) Cucho Hernández	27	(England) Watford	Loan		Summer	sdhuesca.es
—	DF	(Spain) Jorge Miramón	37	Reus	Transfer	Free	Summer	sdhuesca.es
—	DF	(Portugal) Luisinho	41	Deportivo La Coruña	Transfer	Free	Summer	sdhuesca.es
—	MF	(Argentina) Chimy Ávila	32	(Argentina) San Lorenzo	Loan		Summer	sdhuesca.es
—	MF	(Spain) Eugeni Valderrama	32	Valencia B	Transfer	Free	Summer	sdhuesca.es
—	FW	(Italy) Samuele Longo	34	(Italy) Internazionale	Loan		Summer	sdhuesca.es
—	FW	(Honduras) Jonathan Toro	29	(Portugal) Gil Vicente	Transfer	Free	Summer	sdhuesca.es
—	GK	(Argentina) Axel Werner	30	Atlético Madrid	Loan		Summer	sdhuesca.es
—	MF	(Argentina) Damián Musto	39	(Mexico) Tijuana	Loan		Summer	sdhuesca.es
—	FW	(Spain) Dani Escriche	28	Polvorín	Transfer	€500,000	Summer	sdhuesca.es
—	DF	(Portugal) Rúben Semedo	32	Villarreal	Loan		Summer	sdhuesca.es
—	DF	(Spain) Pablo Insua	33	(Germany) Schalke 04	Loan		Summer	sdhuesca.es
—	DF	(Spain) Xabier Etxeita	38	Athletic Bilbao	Loan		Summer	sdhuesca.es
—	MF	(Turkey) Serdar Gürler	35	(Turkey) Osmanlıspor	Transfer	€2,500,000	Summer	sdhuesca.es
—	GK	(Serbia) Aleksandar Jovanović	33	(Denmark) AGF	Transfer	N/A	Summer	sdhuesca.es
—	FW	(Colombia) Juan Peñaloza	26	(Colombia) Estudiantil de Medellín	Transfer^{1}	N/A	Summer	sdhuesca.es
—	MF	(Spain) Christian Rivera	29	Las Palmas	Loan		Summer	sdhuesca.es
—	FW	(Spain) Enric Gallego	40	Extremadura	Transfer	€3,000,000	Winter	sdhuesca.es
—	MF	(Venezuela) Yangel Herrera	28	(England) Manchester City	Loan		Winter	sdhuesca.es
–	LB	(Spain) Javi Galán	31	Córdoba	Transfer	€1,000,000	Winter	sdhuesca.es
—	FW	(Honduras) Jonathan Toro	29	(Portugal) Varzim	Loan return		Winter	varzim.pt
—	CB	(Spain) Adrián Diéguez	30	Alavés	Loan		Winter	sdhuesca.es
—	MF	(Venezuela) Juanpi	32	Málaga	Loan		Winter	sdhuesca.es
—	GK	(Spain) Javi Varas	44	Granada	Transfer	Free	Winter	sdhuesca.es
—	DF	(Argentina) Martín Mantovani	42	Las Palmas	Loan		Winter	sdhuesca.es

1. Joined 1 January 2019.

Total spending: ▼€7,000,000

=== Players out ===
No	Pos	Name	Age	Moving to	Type	Fee	Transfer window	Source
—	FW	(Colombia) Cucho Hernández	27	(England) Watford	Loan return		Summer	sdhuesca.es
—	GK	(Spain) Álex Remiro	31	Athletic Bilbao	Loan return		Summer	sdhuesca.es
—	FW	(Spain) Álvaro Vadillo	32	Granada	End of contract		Summer	sdhuesca.es
—	FW	(Argentina) Ezequiel Rescaldani	34	(Colombia) Atlético Nacional	Loan return		Summer	sdhuesca.es
—	DF	(Venezuela) Alexander González	34	Elche	End of contract		Summer	sdhuesca.es
—	DF	(Spain) Jair Amador	37	(Israel) Maccabi Tel Aviv	End of contract		Summer	sdhuesca.es
—	DF	(Spain) Nagore	45	Retired	End of contract		Summer	sdhuesca.es
—	FW	(Spain) Kilian Grant	32	UCAM Murcia	End of contract		Summer	sdhuesca.es
—	MF	(Argentina) Chimy Ávila	32	(Argentina) San Lorenzo	Loan return		Summer	sdhuesca.es
—	DF	(Spain) Carlos David	40	(Belgium) Union SG	Contract termination		Summer	sdhuesca.es
—	FW	(Spain) Dani Escriche	28	Lugo	Loan		Summer	sdhuesca.es
—	MF	(Spain) Luso	41	Rayo Majadahonda	Contract termination		Summer	sdhuesca.es
—	MF	(Spain) Eugeni Valderrama	32	Albacete	Loan		Summer	sdhuesca.es
—	FW	(Honduras) Jonathan Toro	29	(Portugal) Varzim	Loan		Summer	sdhuesca.es
—	GK	(Spain) Ander Bardají	31	Fuenlabrada	Loan		Summer	sdhuesca.es
—	DF	(Spain) Rulo	30	Alcorcón	Contract termination		Summer	sdhuesca.es
—	CB	(Spain) Íñigo López	44	Extremadura	Contract termination		Summer	extremaduraud.com
—	MF	(Spain) Lluís Sastre	40	(Cyprus) AEK Larnaca	Contract Termination		Winter	sdhuesca.es
—	MF	(Turkey) Serdar Gürler	35	(Turkey) Göztepe	Loan	€400,000	Winter	sdhuesca.es
—	FW	(Italy) Samuele Longo	34	(Italy) Cremonese	Loan return		Winter	sdhuesca.es
—	CB	(Portugal) Rúben Semedo	32	Villarreal	Loan return		Winter	sdhuesca.es
—	LB	(Serbia) Rajko Brežančić	37	Málaga	Contract termination		Winter	sdhuesca.es
—	GK	(Argentina) Axel Werner	30	Atlético Madrid	Loan return		Winter	sdhuesca.es
—	FW	(Honduras) Jonathan Toro	29	(Portugal) Académica	Loan		Winter	sdhuesca.es
—	FW	(Colombia) Juan Peñaloza	26	Teruel	Loan		Winter	sdhuesca.es

Total income: ▲€400,000 million

Net: ▼€6,600,000

== Competitions ==
=== Pre-season ===
Kickoff times are in CEST or CET.

Win Draw Loss

Round	Date	Time	Opponent	Venue	Score	Scorer	Attendance	Referee
Pre-season	14 July 2018	18:00	Atlético Monzón	N	5–0	Miramón 2', Sastre 18', Álex Gallar 28', Camacho 68', Arnedillo 83'	500	Monter Solanas (Aragon)
Pre-season	21 July 2018	20:00	Lleida Esportiu	A	3–2	Melero 20', Moi Gómez 40', Camacho 70'	500	Estrada Fernández (Catalonia)
Pre-season	25 July 2018	19:30	Osasuna	N	0–1		800	González Fuertes (Asturias)
Pre-season	28 July 2018	19:30	Numancia	N	1–5	Ferreiro 55'	700	Laín Pérez (Castile-León)
Pre-season	4 August 2018	19:00	Eibar	N	2–1	Longo 20', Cucho Hernández 22'	300	Recio Moreno (Navarre)
Pre-season	8 August 2018	19:00	Real Oviedo	N	1–2	Camacho 80' (pen.)	500	Ruiz Rabanal (Basque Country)
Pre-season	11 August 2018	19:00	Alavés	N	2–1	Álex Gallar 8', 61'		Velasco Arbaiza (Basque Country)
Season friendly	15 November 2018	12:00	Eibar	N	0–2			Galech Apezteguía (Navarre)

=== Overall ===
Competition	First match	Last match	Starting round	Final position	Record							
Competition	First match	Last match	Starting round	Final position	Pld	W	D	L	GF	GA	GD	Win %
La Liga	19 August 2018	19 May 2019	Matchday 1	19th	38	7	12	19	43	65	−22	18.42
Copa del Rey	28 November 2018	6 December 2018	Round of 32	Round of 32	2	0	0	2	0	8	−8	0.00
Total					40	7	12	21	43	73	−30	17.50

Last updated: 18 May 2019
Source: Competitions

=== Primera División ===
==== League table ====
Pos	Team	Pld	W	D	L	GF	GA	GD	Pts	Qualification or relegation
16	Valladolid	38	10	11	17	32	51	−19	41 (Note: Valladolid finished ahead of Celta Vigo on head-to-head points: Celta Vigo 3–3 Valladolid, Valladolid 2–1 Celta Vigo.)	
17	Celta Vigo	38	10	11	17	53	62	−9	41	
18	Girona (R)	38	9	10	19	37	53	−16	37	Relegation to Segunda División
19	Huesca (R)	38	7	12	19	43	65	−22	33	Relegation to Segunda División
20	Rayo Vallecano (R)	38	8	8	22	41	70	−29	32	Relegation to Segunda División

Source: La Liga, Soccerway
Rules for classification: 1) Points; 2) Head-to-head points; 3) Head-to-head goal difference; 4) Goal difference; 5) Goals scored; 6) Fair-play points (Note: Head-to-head record is used only after all the matches between the teams in question have been played)
(R) Relegated

==== Results summary ====
Overall								Home						Away					
Pld	W	D	L	GF	GA	GD	Pts	W	D	L	GF	GA	GD	W	D	L	GF	GA	GD
38	7	12	19	43	65	−22	33	5	6	8	24	30	−6	2	6	11	19	35	−16

Last updated: 18 May 2019.
Source: La Liga

==== Matches ====
Source: Kickoff times are in CEST or CET.

Win Draw Loss

19 August 2018 1	Eibar	1–2	Huesca	Eibar
18:15 CEST (UTC+02:00)	Jordán (yellow card) 50'; Escalante 69'	Report	Gallar 5', 40'; Longo (yellow card) 90+3'	Stadium: Ipurua; Attendance: 4,209; Referee: Eduardo Prieto Iglesias

27 August 2018 2	Athletic Bilbao	2–2	Huesca	Bilbao
22:00 CEST (UTC+02:00)	D. García (yellow card) 42'; Susaeta 47'; Berchiche 63'; Iturraspe (yellow card) 73'	Report	Miramón 71'; Pulido (yellow card) 72'; Ávila 87'; Musto (yellow card) 90+2'	Stadium: San Mamés; Attendance: 36,900; Referee: Javier Alberola

2 September 2018 3	Barcelona	8–2	Huesca	Barcelona
18:30 CEST (UTC+02:00)	Messi 16', 61'; Pulido 24' (o.g.); Suárez 39', 90+3' (pen.); O. Dembélé 48'; I. Rakitić 52'; Jordi Alba 81'; Vidal (yellow card) 88'	Report	Hernández 3'; Luisinho (yellow card) 26'; Alex Gallar 42'; Musto (yellow card) 87'	Stadium: Camp Nou; Attendance: 72,892; Referee: Mario Melero López

14 September 2018 4	Huesca	0–1	Rayo Vallecano	Huesca
21:00 CEST (UTC+02:00)	Ávila (yellow card) 79'; Luisinho (yellow card) 90+3'	Report	Imbula 29'; Amat (yellow card) 53'	Stadium: El Alcoraz; Attendance: 6,502; Referee: David Medié Jiménez

21 September 2018 5	Huesca	0–1	Real Sociedad	Huesca
21:00 CEST (UTC+02:00)	Luisinho (yellow card) 43'; C. Hernández (yellow card) 45'; Gallar (yellow card) 65'; Longo (yellow card) 76'; Ferreiro (yellow card) 90+1'	Report	Pardo (yellow card) 23'; Merino 64'; Juanmi (yellow card) 71' (yellow-red card) 71'; Hernandez (red card) 82'	Stadium: El Alcoraz; Attendance: 6,948; Referee: Ignacio Iglesias Villanueva

25 September 2018 6	Atlético Madrid	3–0	Huesca	Madrid
22:00 CEST (UTC+02:00)	Griezmann 16'; Thomas 29'; Koke 33'	Report	Semedo (yellow card) 45'; Musto (yellow card) 67'	Stadium: Wanda Metropolitano; Attendance: 47,109; Referee: Pablo González Fuertes

30 September 2018 7	Huesca	1–1	Girona	Huesca
12:00 CEST (UTC+02:00)	Ávila (yellow card) 28'; Musto (yellow card) 45'; Melero 72' (pen.); Ferreiro (yellow card) 87'	Report	Stuani 37' (pen.), (yellow card) 39'; Espinosa (yellow card) 70'	Stadium: El Alcoraz; Attendance: 6,786; Referee: Adrián Cordero Vega

7 October 2018 8	Real Valladolid	1–0	Huesca	Valladolid
12:00 CEST (UTC+02:00)	Míchel (yellow card) 6'; Alcaraz 28'	Report	Gürler (yellow card) 13'; Semedo (yellow card) 27'	Stadium: José Zorrilla; Attendance: 17,474; Referee: Antonio Mateu Lahoz

21 October 2018 9	Huesca	0–2	Espanyol	Huesca
18:30 CEST (UTC+02:00)	Musto (yellow card) 58'; Ávila (yellow card) 67'; Miramón (yellow card) 90+9'	Report	Granero (yellow card) 39'; Iglesias 41', 64'; Hermoso (yellow card) 68'; Vilà (yellow card) 73'	Stadium: El Alcoraz; Attendance: 6,964; Referee: Eduardo Prieto Iglesias

28 October 2018 10	Sevilla	2–1	Huesca	Seville
20:45 CET (UTC+01:00)	Carriço (yellow card) 45'; Arana (yellow card) 61'; Sarabia 65', 78'	Report	Gürler (yellow card) 45'; Miramón (yellow card) 60'; Ávila (yellow card) 90+2'; Pulido 90+3'	Stadium: Ramón Sánchez Pizjuán; Attendance: 33,022; Referee: David Medié Jiménez

4 November 2018 11	Huesca	1–1	Getafe	Huesca
18:30 CET (UTC+01:00)	Miramon (yellow card) 23'; Etxeita 50'; Musto (yellow card) 59'; Ferreiro (yellow card) 74'; Semedo (yellow card) 74'; Gallar (yellow card) 75'	Report	Rodriguez (yellow card) 54'; Suárez (yellow card) 85'; Molina 90+1'; Dakonam (yellow card) 90+4'	Stadium: El Alcoraz; Attendance: 6,445; Referee: Juan Martínez Munuera

11 November 2018 12	Alavés	2–1	Huesca	Vitoria-Gasteiz
12:00 CET (UTC+01:00)	Jony 41'; Navarro (yellow card) 45+1'; Sobrino 68', (yellow card) 73'; Maripan (yellow card) 74'	Report	Gómez 35'; Semedo (yellow card) 45+1'; Musto (yellow card) 70'; Akapo (yellow card) 76'; Hernández (yellow card) 90+2'	Stadium: Mendizorrotza; Attendance: 14,554; Referee: José Luis Munuera Montero

24 November 2018 13	Huesca	2–2	Levante	Huesca
18:30 CET (UTC+01:00)	Pulido (yellow card) 12'; Rivera 23'; Etxeita 51', (yellow card) 76'; Jovanović (yellow card) 75'; Ávila (yellow card) 81' (yellow-red card) 90+6'	Report	Vukčević (yellow card) 10'; Roger 45+1'; Prcić (yellow card) 67'; Boateng 74'; Toño (yellow card) 81'	Stadium: El Alcoraz; Attendance: 6,496; Referee: Xavier Estrada Fernández

1 December 2018 14	Celta Vigo	2–0	Huesca	Vigo
13:00 CET (UTC+01:00)	Boufal (yellow card) 32'; Aspas 38', 77'; Blanco (yellow card) 59'	Report	Hernández (yellow card) 29'; Musto (yellow card) 31'; Etxeita (yellow card) 37'	Stadium: Balaídos; Attendance: 13,463; Referee: Adrián Cordero Vega

9 December 2018 15	Huesca	0–1	Real Madrid	Huesca
16:15 CET (UTC+01:00)	Etxeita (yellow card) 42'; Insua (yellow card) 80'	Report	Bale 8'; Carvajal (yellow card) 26'; Ceballos (yellow card) 39'	Stadium: El Alcoraz; Attendance: 7,341; Referee: Mario Melero López

16 December 2018 16	Huesca	2–2	Villarreal	Huesca
18:30 CET (UTC+01:00)	Ávila (yellow card) 16'; Hernández 44' (pen.); Insua (yellow card) 53'; Pulido (yellow card) 73'; Longo 90+4', (yellow card) 90+4'	Report	Trigueros (yellow card) 42'; Mario Gaspar (yellow card) 43' (yellow-red card) 65'; Bacca 63' (pen.), (yellow card) 66'; Gerard 81'; Cáseres (yellow card) 90+4'	Stadium: El Alcoraz; Attendance: 6,455; Referee: David Medié Jiménez

23 December 2018 17	Valencia	2–1	Huesca	Valencia
12:00 CET (UTC+01:00)	Parejo 25'; Mina (yellow card) 31'; Cheryshev (yellow card) 34'; Garay (yellow card) 49'; Rodrigo (yellow card) 63'; Gayà (yellow card) 84'; Soler (yellow card) 87'; Piccini 90+4', (yellow card) 90+4'	Report	Insua (yellow card) 54'; Hernández 72' (pen.); Longo (yellow card) 82'; Rivera (yellow card) 84'; Etxeita (yellow card) 90+5'	Stadium: Mestalla; Attendance: 36,547; Referee: Jesús Gil Manzano

5 January 2019 18	Huesca	2–1	Real Betis	Huesca
20:45 CET (UTC+01:00)	Hernández (yellow card) 41'; Etxeita (yellow card) 45'; Ferreiro 73'; Rivera 79'; Gómez (yellow card) 85'	Report	Feddal (yellow card) 8'; Sanabria 55' (pen.); Francis (yellow card) 78'	Stadium: El Alcoraz; Attendance: 6,135; Referee: Ricardo de Burgos Bengoetxea

12 January 2019 19	Leganés	1–0	Huesca	Leganés
13:00 CET (UTC+01:00)	Siovas (yellow card) 35'; Bustinza (yellow card) 58'; En-Nesyri 73'; Silva (yellow card) 89'	Report	Melero (yellow card) 30'; Santamaría (yellow card) 65'; Pulido (yellow card) 67'	Stadium: Municipal de Butarque; Attendance: 10,341; Referee: Mario Melero López

19 January 2019 20	Huesca	0–3	Atlético Madrid	Huesca
18:30 CET (UTC+01:00)	Etxeita (yellow card) 24'; Gallego (yellow card) 68'	Report	Hernandez 31'; Arias 52'; Giménez (yellow card) 62'; Correa (yellow card) 64'; Koke 71'	Stadium: Estadio El Alcoraz; Attendance: 7,107; Referee: Guillermo Cuadra Fernández

27 January 2019 21	Real Sociedad	0–0	Huesca	San Sebastián
18:30 CET (UTC+01:00)		Report	Miramón (yellow card) 59'; Herrera (yellow card) 63'; Akapo (yellow card) 90+4'	Stadium: Anoeta; Attendance: 21,252; Referee: Eduardo Prieto Iglesias

1 February 2019 22	Huesca	4–0	Real Valladolid	Huesca
21:00 CET (UTC+01:00)	Gallego 19'; Hernández (yellow card) 37'; Pulido 50', (yellow card) 82'; Gómez 53', (yellow card) 85'; Insua (yellow card) 63'; Galán (yellow card) 69'; Ávila 77'; Musto (yellow card) 83'	Report	Anuar (yellow card) 85'; Calero (yellow card) 88'	Stadium: El Alcoraz; Attendance: 6,052; Referee: José Luis Munuera Montero

9 February 2019 23	Girona	0–2	Huesca	Girona
20:45 CET (UTC+01:00)	Espinosa (yellow card) 48' (yellow-red card) 68'; García (yellow card) 69'	Report	Ávila 35', 40'; Galán (yellow card) 81'	Stadium: Montilivi; Attendance: 10,662; Referee: Adrián Cordero Vega

18 February 2019 24	Huesca	0–1	Athletic Bilbao	Huesca
21:00 CET (UTC+01:00)	Herrera (yellow card) 38'; Miramón (yellow card) 41'; Gallego (yellow card) 42'; Diéguez (yellow card) 68'; Gómez (yellow card) 73'	Report	García 19' (pen.); Capa (yellow card) 32'	Stadium: El Alcoraz; Attendance: 6,742; Referee: José María Sánchez Martínez

22 February 2019 25	Espanyol	1–1	Huesca	Cornellà de Llobregat
21:00 CET (UTC+01:00)	Granero 20', (yellow card) 31'; Semedo (yellow card) 80'	Report	Etxeita (yellow card) 25', (goal) 47'; Ávila (yellow card) 28'; Juanpi (yellow card) 69'; Galán (yellow card) 76'	Stadium: RCDE Stadium; Attendance: 20,078; Referee: Alejandro Hernández Hernández

2 March 2019 26	Huesca	2–1	Sevilla	Huesca
18:30 CET (UTC+01:00)	Juanpi 7'; Etxeita (yellow card) 61'; Galán (yellow card) 66'; Herrera (yellow card) 77'; Pulido (yellow card) 78'; Ávila 90+8', (yellow card) 90+9'	Report	Rog (yellow card) 40'; Promes (yellow card) 45'; Kjær (yellow card) 54'; Ben Yedder 84' (pen.); Mercado (yellow card) 90+8'	Stadium: El Alcoraz; Attendance: 6,818; Referee: Ricardo de Burgos Bengoetxea

9 March 2019 27	Getafe	2–1	Huesca	Getafe
20:45 CET (UTC+01:00)	Mata 50', 77' (pen.)	Report	Galán (yellow card) 4'; Etxeita (yellow card) 20'; Gallego 35'; Ferreiro (yellow card) 69'; Musto (yellow card) 82'	Stadium: Coliseum Alfonso Pérez; Attendance: 10,882; Referee: Eduardo Prieto Iglesias

16 March 2019 28	Huesca	1–3	Alavés	Huesca
13:00 CET (UTC+01:00)	Ávila 14' (pen.); Ferreiro (yellow card) 38'	Report	Calleri 11' (pen.), 86'; Laguardia (yellow card) 33'; Guidetti 80'; Maripán (yellow card) 89'; Pina (yellow card) 90+1'	Stadium: El Alcoraz; Attendance: 6,811; Referee: Alberto Undiano Mallenco

31 March 2019 29	Real Madrid	3–2	Huesca	Madrid
20:45 CEST (UTC+02:00)	Isco 25'; Ceballos 62'; Nacho (yellow card) 66'; Benzema 89'	Report	Hernández 3'; Pulido (yellow card) 48'; Musto (yellow card) 51'; Etxeita 74'; Mantovani (yellow card) 90'	Stadium: Santiago Bernabéu; Attendance: 49,293; Referee: Xavier Estrada Fernández

3 April 2019 30	Huesca	3–3	Celta Vigo	Huesca
20:30 CEST (UTC+02:00)	Pulido (yellow card) 25', (goal) 73'; Etxeita (yellow card) 55'; Gallego 63'; Ávila 71'	Report	Méndez 14', (yellow card) 18'; Olaza (yellow card) 52'; Aspas 57'; Boudebouz 81'; Mor (yellow card) 88'	Stadium: El Alcoraz; Attendance: 6,552; Referee: Adrián Cordero Vega

7 April 2019 31	Levante	2–2	Huesca	Valencia
18:30 CEST (UTC+02:00)	Roger 19', (yellow card) 58'; Chema (yellow card) 36'; Morales 65' (pen.)	Report	Hernández (yellow card) 40'; Gallego 63'; Ávila 69', (yellow card) 83'; Diéguez (yellow card) 76'; Juanpi (yellow card) 90+1'	Stadium: Ciutat de València; Attendance: 19,824; Referee: Carlos del Cerro Grande

13 April 2019 32	Huesca	0–0	Barcelona	Huesca
16:15 CEST (UTC+02:00)	Pulido (yellow card) 90+1'	Report	Todibo (yellow card) 42'; Wagué (yellow card) 90'	Stadium: El Alcoraz; Attendance: 7,332; Referee: Guillermo Cuadra Fernández

20 April 2019 33	Rayo Vallecano	0–0	Huesca	Madrid
18:30 CEST (UTC+02:00)	Medrán (yellow card) 45'; Tito (yellow card) 45'; Pozo (yellow card) 66'; De Tomás (yellow card) 86'	Report	Gallego (yellow card) 47'; Melero (yellow card) 62'	Stadium: Vallecas; Attendance: 10,542; Referee: José Luis González González

23 April 2019 34	Huesca	2–0	Eibar	Huesca
19:30 CEST (UTC+02:00)	Gallego (yellow card) 24', (goal) 54'; Mantovani (yellow card) 37'; Ávila 57', (yellow card) 70'; Herrera (yellow card) 86'	Report	Diop (yellow card) 31'	Stadium: El Alcoraz; Attendance: 6,157; Referee: David Medié Jiménez

28 April 2019 35	Villarreal	1–1	Huesca	Villarreal
18:30 CEST (UTC+02:00)	Mario Gaspar (yellow card) 7'; Fornals 30', (yellow card) 40'; Toko Ekambi (yellow card) 56'; Cáseres (yellow card) 75'; Quintillà (yellow card) 90+1'	Report	Galán (yellow card) 53'; Ávila 78'; Herrera (yellow card) 86'; Pulido (red card) 90+2'	Stadium: Estadio de la Cerámica; Attendance: 17,901; Referee: José María Sánchez Martínez

5 May 2019 36	Huesca	2–6	Valencia	Huesca
20:45 CEST (UTC+02:00)	Ávila (yellow card) 30'; Melero 66'; Rivera (yellow card) 85'; Gallar 90+2' (pen.)	Report	Wass 2'; Rodrigo 16', 51'; Mina 20', 32'; Coquelin (yellow card) 29'; Etxeita 40' (o.g.)	Stadium: El Alcoraz; Attendance: 6,378; Referee: Carlos del Cerro Grande

12 May 2019 37	Real Betis	2–1	Huesca	Seville
18:30 CEST (UTC+02:00)	Joaquín 22', 90+8', (yellow card) 90+9'; Guardado (yellow card) 70'; Feddal (yellow card) 90+2'	Report	Juanpi 55' (pen.); Etxeita (yellow card) 61'; Diéguez (yellow card) 64'; Galán (yellow card) 64'; Melero (yellow card) 70'; Pulido (red card) 76'; Luisinho (yellow card) 90+7'	Stadium: Benito Villamarín; Attendance: 28,078; Referee: Adrián Cordero Vega

18 May 2019 38	Huesca	2–1	Leganés	Huesca
20:45 CEST (UTC+02:00)	Mantovani 55', 83'	Report	Omeruo (yellow card) 17'; Mantovani 39' (o.g.)	Stadium: El Alcoraz; Attendance: 5,575; Referee: Javier Alberola Rojas

=== Copa del Rey ===
Source: Kickoff times are in CEST or CET.

Win Draw Loss

28 November 2018 First leg	Athletic Bilbao	4–0	Huesca	Bilbao
20:45 CEST (UTC+02:00)	Aduriz 10', 32'; Insua 27' (o.g.); Beñat 55'; San José (yellow card) 59'	Report	Ávila (yellow card) 9'; Sastre (yellow card) 22'; Brežančić (yellow card) 41'	Stadium: San Mamés; Attendance: 25,360; Referee: José González
Note: This match was originally scheduled to take place on 31 October, but later postponed because of an MTV concert at San Mamés.

6 December 2018 Second leg	Huesca	0–4 (0–8 agg.)	Athletic Bilbao	Huesca
18:30 CEST (UTC+02:00)	Musto (yellow card) 27'; Ávila (yellow card) 72'	Report	Aduriz 37', 58'; Williams 80', 90+2'	Stadium: El Alcoraz; Attendance: 5,561; Referee: Carlos del Cerro
