= 2014–15 Deportivo de La Coruña season =

Deportivo de La Coruña
2014–15 season
- President: Tino Fernández
- Manager: Victor Fernández (until 9 April); Víctor Sánchez (from 9 April)
- Stadium: Riazor
- La Liga: 16th
- Copa del Rey: Round of 32
- Top goalscorer: League: Lucas Pérez (6); All: Lucas Pérez (6)
- Highest home attendance: 30,334
- Lowest home attendance: 14,167
- Average home league attendance: 21,275
Home colours	Away colours	Third colours

The 2014–15 season Deportivo de La Coruña season is the club's 108th season in its history and its 43rd in La Liga, the top-flight of Spanish football.

== Squad ==
As 2014..

=== Current squad ===
As of 2 September 2014

Note: Flags indicate national team as defined under FIFA eligibility rules; some limited exceptions apply. Players may hold more than one non-FIFA nationality.

No.	Pos.	Nation	Player
1	GK	ARG	Germán Lux
2	DF	ESP	Manuel Pablo (captain)
3	DF	ESP	Roberto Canella (on loan from Sporting Gijón)
4	MF	ESP	Álex Bergantiños
5	DF	ESP	Pablo Insua
6	MF	ESP	José Rodríguez (on loan from Real Madrid)
7	FW	ESP	Lucas Pérez (on loan from PAOK)
8	MF	BIH	Haris Medunjanin
9	FW	POR	Hélder Postiga
10	MF	ESP	Juan Domínguez
11	DF	ESP	Juanfran (on loan from Watford)
12	DF	BRA	Sidnei (on loan from Benfica)
13	GK	ESP	Fabricio

No.	Pos.	Nation	Player
14	FW	ESP	Isaac Cuenca
15	DF	ESP	Laure (vice-captain)
16	DF	POR	Luisinho
17	FW	POR	Diogo Salomão (on loan from Sporting CP)
18	FW	ESP	Toché
19	FW	POR	Ivan Cavaleiro (on loan from Benfica)
20	MF	POL	Cezary Wilk
22	DF	ESP	Diego Seoane
23	DF	ESP	Alberto Lopo
24	MF	ARG	Luis Fariña (on loan from Benfica)
25	MF	ESP	Juan Carlos

== Pre-season and friendlies ==
23 July 2014 LFP WC	Santa Fe	1–0	Deportivo	Bogotá, Colombia
03:00 MST	Seijas 13'	Report		Stadium: Estadio El Campín; Attendance: 8,000; Referee: Ímer Machado (Colombia)

25 July 2014 LFP WC	Deportivo Cali	3–1	Deportivo	Cali, Colombia
03:00 MST	Herrera 58'; Candelo 74'; R. Ramírez 88'	Report	Bergantiños 85'	Stadium: Estadio Olímpico Pascual Guerrero; Attendance: 11,000; Referee: Wilson Lamouroux (Colombia)

31 July 2014 Friendly match	Académica de Coimbra	0–0	Deportivo	Coimbra, Portugal
21:00 UTC±0		Report		Stadium: Estádio Cidade de Coimbra; Referee: Tiago Antunes (Portugal)

2 August 2014 Friendly match	Braga	1–0	Deportivo	Braga, Portugal
19:00 UTC±0	Sasso 85'	Report		Stadium: Estádio Municipal de Braga; Referee: Jorge Sousa (Portugal)

5 August 2014 Friendly match	Racing Ferrol	0–2	Deportivo	Monforte de Lemos, Spain
19:30 CEST		Report	Fariña 56'; Toché 84'	Stadium: A Pinguela; Referee: Cid Parga (Spain)

9 August 2014 Teresa Herrera Trophy	Deportivo	3–0	Nacional	A Coruña, Spain
20:30 CEST	Fariña 8', 12'; Toché 56'	Report		Stadium: Riazor; Attendance: 9,000; Referee: Ignacio Iglesias Villanueva (Spain)

10 August 2014 Teresa Herrera Trophy	Deportivo	1–0	Sporting Gijón	A Coruña, Spain
20:30 CEST	A. Serrano 40' (o.g.)	Report		Stadium: Riazor; Attendance: 11,000; Referee: Carlos Velasco Carballo (Spain)

13 August 2014 Galician Football Federation Trophy	Celta Vigo	2–0	Deportivo	Pontevedra, Spain
21:30 CEST	Nolito 49'; Larrivey 74'	Report		Stadium: Pasarón; Attendance: 7,500; Referee: Ignacio Iglesias Villanueva (Spain)

16 August 2014 Friendly match	Ponferradina	3–2	Deportivo	Ponferrada, Spain
20:00 CEST	Yuri 23'; Infante 56'; Sobrino 86'	Report	Domínguez 39'; Toché 75'	Stadium: El Toralín; Attendance: 3,000; Referee: Víctor Areces Franco (Spain)

4 September 2014 50th anniversary Laracha CF	Laracha	0–3	Deportivo	A Laracha, Spain
20:30 CEST		Report	Remeseiro 15'; Cardoso 18'; Wilk 85'	Stadium: Municipal de Laracha; Attendance: 1,500; Referee: López Fernández (Spain)

11 September 2014 Friendly match	Arosa	1–3	Deportivo	Vilagarcía de Arousa, Spain
20:30 CEST	Santi 30'	Report	Cavaleiro 21'; Toché 28'; Postiga 37'	Stadium: A Lomba; Attendance: 1.800; Referee: Antonio Loira Rodríguez (Spain)

== Statistics ==
=== Appearances and goals ===
Updated as of 30 May 2015.

No.	Pos	Nat	Player	Total		La Liga		Copa del Rey	
No.	Pos	Nat	Player	Apps	Goals	Apps	Goals	Apps	Goals
1	GK	(Argentina) ARG	Germán Lux	9	0	7	0	2	0
2	DF	(Spain) ESP	Manuel Pablo	7	0	5	0	2	0
3	DF	(Spain) ESP	Roberto Canella	10	0	5+4	0	1	0
4	MF	(Spain) ESP	Álex Bergantiños	34	0	29+4	0	1	0
5	DF	(Spain) ESP	Pablo Insua	18	0	14+3	0	1	0
6	MF	(Spain) ESP	José Rodríguez	27	2	17+8	2	0+2	0
7	FW	(Spain) ESP	Lucas Pérez	21	6	20+1	6	0	0
8	MF	(Bosnia and Herzegovina) BIH	Haris Medunjanin	25	2	16+8	2	0+1	0
9	FW	(Portugal) POR	Hélder Postiga	16	2	8+6	1	1+1	1
10	MF	(Spain) ESP	Juan Domínguez	24	1	13+9	1	2	0
11	DF	(Spain) ESP	Juanfran	34	1	33+1	1	0	0
12	DF	(Brazil) BRA	Sidnei	32	0	32	0	0	0
13	GK	(Spain) ESP	Fabri	31	0	31	0	0	0
14	FW	(Spain) ESP	Isaac Cuenca	29	2	14+13	2	2	0
15	DF	(Spain) ESP	Laure	21	0	14+5	0	2	0
16	DF	(Portugal) POR	Luisinho	36	0	34+1	0	1	0
17	FW	(Portugal) POR	Diogo Salomão	7	1	2+4	1	0+1	0
18	FW	(Spain) ESP	Toché	26	5	9+16	4	1	1
19	FW	(Portugal) POR	Ivan Cavaleiro	34	3	27+7	3	0	0
20	MF	(Poland) POL	Cezary Wilk	12	0	6+5	0	1	0
21	FW	(Spain) ESP	Oriol Riera	21	4	18+3	4	0	0
22	MF	(Costa Rica) CRC	Celso Borges	17	3	17	3	0	0
23	DF	(Spain) ESP	Alberto Lopo	32	2	30	2	2	0
24	MF	(Argentina) ARG	Luis Fariña	21	1	15+6	1	0	0
28	MF	(Spain) ESP	Marcos Remeseiro	1	0	0	0	0+1	0
32	FW	(Portugal) POR	Hélder Costa	6	0	0+6	0	0	0
Players who have made an appearance or had a squad number this season but have been loaned out or transferred
21	DF	(France) FRA	Modibo Diakité	3	0	2	0	1	0
22	DF	(Spain) ESP	Diego Seoane	0	0	0	0	0	0
25	MF	(Spain) ESP	Juan Carlos	4	0	0+2	0	2	0

== Competitions ==
=== La Liga ===
==== League table ====
Pos	Team	Pld	W	D	L	GF	GA	GD	Pts
14	Levante	38	9	10	19	34	67	−33	37 (Note: Levante ahead on head-to-head record; Levante–Getafe 1–1, Getafe–Levante 0–1.)
15	Getafe	38	10	7	21	33	64	−31	37
16	Deportivo La Coruña	38	7	14	17	35	60	−25	35 (Note: Head-to-head record: Deportivo 7 pts, Granada 6 pts, Eibar 2 pts)
17	Granada	38	7	14	17	29	64	−35	35
18	Eibar	38	9	8	21	34	55	−21	35

Source: La Liga
Rules for classification: 1) points; 2) head-to-head points; 3) head-to-head goal difference; 4) goal difference; 5) number of goals scored; 6) fair-play points; 7) playoff match

==== Matches ====
Kickoff times are in CET. Win Draw Loss

23 August 2014 1	Granada	2–1	Deportivo	Granada
21:00 CEST	Rochina 54'; El-Arabi (yellow card) 67'; Babin 77'	Report	Cavaleiro 20'; Luisinho (yellow card) 41'; Lopo (yellow card) 56'; Rodríguez (yellow card) 76'	Stadium: Los Cármenes; Referee: Iñaki Vicani Garrido (Basque Country)

31 August 2014 2	Deportivo	2–2	Rayo Vallecano	A Coruña
21:00 CEST	Rodríguez 6', (yellow card) 37'; Lopo (yellow card) 26'; Insua (yellow card) 45'; Laure (yellow card) 83'; Cuenca 90' (pen.)	Report	Bueno 40', 72'; Quini (yellow card) 43'; Tito (yellow card) 52'; Baena (yellow card) 84'; Castro (yellow card) 88'; Trashorras (yellow card) 89'; Ba (yellow card) 90'	Stadium: Riazor; Referee: José González González (Castile-León)

15 September 2014 3	Eibar	0–1	Deportivo	Eibar
20:45 CEST		Report	Domínguez 12'; Cavaleiro (yellow card) 15'; Medunjanin (yellow card) 31'; Postiga (yellow card) 53'; Lopo (yellow card) 78'; Fabricio (yellow card) 83'; Sidnei (yellow card) 87'	Stadium: Ipurua; Referee: Mario Melero López (Andalusia)

20 September 2014 4	Deportivo	2–8	Real Madrid	A Coruña
16:00 CEST	Medunjanin 51' (pen.); Sidnei (yellow card) 65'; Toché 83'	Report	Ronaldo 29', 41', 78'; Rodríguez 36'; Ramos (yellow card) 50'; Bale 66', 74'; Hernández 88', 90+2'	Stadium: Riazor; Attendance: 25,000; Referee: Pedro Pérez Montero (Andalusia)

23 September 2014 5	Celta Vigo	2–1	Deportivo	Vigo
22:00 CEST	Nolito 3'; Orellana 72'	Report	Cuenca 55'	Stadium: Balaídos; Referee: Carlos del Cerro Grande

28 September 2014 6	Deportivo	0–1	Almería	A Coruña
17:00 CEST	Laure (yellow card) 2'; Lopo (yellow card) 89'	Report	Trujillo (yellow card) 32'; Navarro (yellow card) 40'; Dubarbier (yellow card) 62'; Rubén (yellow card) 85'; Édgar 90+2'	Stadium: Riazor; Referee: Teixeira Vitienes

5 October 2014 7	Sevilla	4–1	Deportivo	Seville
12:00 CEST	Mbia (yellow card) 9', (goal) 24', 57'; Coke (yellow card) 30'; Bacca 39'; Vitolo 63'	Report	Medunjanin 31'; Lux (yellow card) 68'; Wilk (yellow card) 78'	Stadium: Ramón Sánchez Pizjuán; Referee: Jesús Gil Manzano (Extremadura)

19 October 2014 8	Deportivo	3–0	Valencia	A Coruña
17:00 CEST	Mustafi 36' (o.g.); Lucas 43'; Fariña (yellow card) 52'; Juanfran (yellow card) 75'; Toché 79', (yellow card) 86'; Rodríguez (yellow card) 90+3'	Summary	Filipe Augusto (yellow card) 35'; Feghouli (yellow card) 71'; Alcácer (yellow card) 77'; Parejo (yellow card) 90'	Stadium: Riazor; Attendance: 21,908; Referee: Javier Estrada Fernández

26 October 2014 9	Espanyol	0–0	Deportivo	Barcelona
17:00 CEST	Sánchez (yellow card) 52'; Álvaro (yellow card) 79'	Report	Luisinho (yellow card) 37'; Medunjanin (yellow card) 53'; Postiga (yellow card) 69'; Insua (yellow card) 80'	Stadium: Cornellà-El Prat; Attendance: 22,732; Referee: Carlos Velasco Carballo

31 October 2014 10	Deportivo	1–2	Getafe	A Coruña
19:45 CET	Wilk (yellow card) 31'; Cavaleiro (yellow card) 60'; Postiga 80'	Report	Yoda 35'; Lafita 46', (yellow card) 62'	Stadium: Riazor; Attendance: 20,150; Referee: Alejandro Hernández Hernández

7 November 2014 11	Córdoba	0–0	Deportivo	Córdoba
20:45 CET	Luso (yellow card) 18'; Í. López (yellow card) 29'; Pinillos (yellow card) 43'; Pantić (yellow card) 59'	Report	Postiga (yellow card) 16' (yellow-red card) 29'	Stadium: Nuevo Arcángel; Attendance: 15,643

22 November 2014 12	Deportivo	0–0	Real Sociedad	A Coruña
22:00 CET	Juanfran (yellow card) 33'; Medunjanin (yellow card) 37'; Lopo (yellow card) 90+1'	Report	Ansotegi (yellow card) 52'	Stadium: Riazor; Attendance: 18,521; Referee: Eduardo Prieto Iglesias

30 November 2014 13	Atlético Madrid	2–0	Deportivo	Madrid
12:00 CET	Mandžukić (yellow card) 33'; Giménez (yellow card) 38'; Saúl 43'; Turan 55'	Report	Juanfran (yellow card) 13'; Insua (yellow card) 40'	Stadium: Vicente Calderón; Attendance: 45,000; Referee: José Teixeira Vitienes

6 December 2014 14	Deportivo	0–1	Málaga	A Coruña
22:00 CET	Luisinho (yellow card) 60'; Sidnei (yellow card) 61'; Cuenca (yellow card) 73'; Toché (yellow card) 86'	Report	Kameni (yellow card) 11'; Darder 21'; Antunes (yellow card) 24'; Samu (yellow card) 50'	Stadium: Riazor; Attendance: 19,000; Referee: Jesús Gil Manzano

15 December 2014 15	Deportivo	1–0	Elche	A Coruña
20:45 CET	Fariña 22'; Lopo (yellow card) 50'; Cavaleiro (yellow card) 52'; Bergantiños (yellow card) 56'; Luisinho (yellow card) 68'; Fabricio (yellow card) 90+1'	Report	Suárez (yellow card) 33'; José Ángel (yellow card) 34'	Stadium: Riazor; Attendance: 14,167; Referee: Mario Melero López

21 December 2014 16	Villarreal	3–0	Deportivo	Vilarreal
12:00 CET	J. Dos Santos 10'; Vietto 68', 73'; Bruno (yellow card) 75'; Pina (red card) 80'	Report	Sidnei (yellow card) 56'; Toché (yellow card) 61'; Lopo (yellow card) 70'	Stadium: El Madrigal; Attendance: 16,000; Referee: José González González

3 January 2015 17	Deportivo	1–0	Athletic Bilbao	A Coruña
22:00 CET	Cavaleiro 24'; Domínguez (yellow card) 85'	Report	López (yellow card) 63'	Stadium: Riazor; Attendance: 16,200; Referee: Alberto Undiano Mallenco

9 January 2015 18	Levante	0–0	Deportivo	Valencia
20:45 CET	Víctor (yellow card) 40'; Barral (yellow card) 42'; Karabelas (yellow card) 68'; Navarro (yellow card) 75'	Report	Bergantiños (yellow card) 34'; Lopo (yellow card) 43'; Sidnei (yellow card) 73'	Stadium: Ciutat de València; Attendance: 17,000; Referee: Pedro Pérez Montero

18 January 2015 19	Deportivo	0–4	Barcelona	A Coruña
19:00 CET	Riera (yellow card) 59'; Toché (yellow card) 64'	Report	Messi 10', 33', 62'; Bartra (yellow card) 68'; Alves (yellow card) 78'; Sidnei 83' (o.g.)	Stadium: Riazor; Attendance: 25,173; Referee: Juan Martínez Munuera

25 January 2015 20	Deportivo	2–2	Granada	A Coruña
12:00 CET	Rodríguez 34', (yellow card) 43'; Lucas 38', (yellow card) 55'; Domínguez (yellow card) 47'; Fariña (red card) 86'	Report	Piti 7'; Juan Carlos (yellow card) 74'; Ibáñez 83'; Rico (yellow card) 87'; Córdoba (yellow card) 90+1'	Stadium: Riazor; Attendance: 17,000; Referee: Carlos del Cerro Grande

30 January 2015 21	Rayo Vallecano	1–2	Deportivo	Madrid
20:45 CET	Bueno 22'; Castro (yellow card) 30'; Ba (yellow card) 71'; Baena (yellow card) 90+4'; Toño (yellow card) 90+5'	Report	Borges 10', 72' (pen.); Rodríguez (yellow card) 39'; Sidnei (yellow card) 51'; Laure (yellow card) 51'; Lucas (yellow card) 59'; Insua (yellow card) 90+1'	Stadium: Campo de Vallecas; Attendance: 10,724; Referee: Eduardo Prieto Iglesias

6 February 2015 22	Deportivo	2–0	Eibar	A Coruña
20:45 CET	Lucas 52', (yellow card) 54'; Insua (yellow card) 61'; Cavaleiro 79'	Report	García (yellow card) 54'; Borja (yellow card) 84'; Ekiza (yellow card) 88'	Stadium: Riazor; Attendance: 16,898; Referee: Carlos Velasco Carballo

14 February 2015 23	Real Madrid	2–0	Deportivo	Madrid
18:00 CET	Isco 22'; Nacho (yellow card) 48'; Benzema 73'; Arbeloa (yellow card) 78'	Report	Borges (yellow card) 45'; Manuel Pablo (yellow card) 61'; Lopo (yellow card) 83'; Laure (yellow card) 89'	Stadium: Santiago Bernabéu; Attendance: 68,500; Referee: Javier Estrada Fernández

21 February 2015 24	Deportivo	0–2	Celta Vigo	A Coruña
22:00 CET	Lopo (yellow card) 6' (yellow-red card) 72'; Luisinho (yellow card) 53'; Lucas (yellow card) 65'	Report	Charles 46', (yellow card) 59'; Nolito (yellow card) 65'; Larrivey 82'; Sergio (yellow card) 86'; Gómez (yellow card) 87'	Stadium: Riazor; Attendance: 30,334; Referee: Pedro Pérez Montero

28 February 2015 25	Almería	0–0	Deportivo	Almería
20:00 CET	Bifouma (yellow card) 27' (yellow-red card) 55'; Navarro (yellow card) 53'; Édgar (yellow card) 71'; Michel (yellow card) 90+2' (yellow-red card) 90+3'	Report	Luisinho (yellow card) 23'; Rodríguez (yellow card) 45'; Borges (yellow card) 85'	Stadium: Juegos Mediterráneos; Attendance: 11,000; Referee: Jesús Gil Manzano

7 March 2015 26	Deportivo	3–4	Sevilla	A Coruña
16:00 CET	Riera 28', 72'; Bergantiños (yellow card) 63'; Lucas 90+3' (pen.)	Report	Vitolo 33', 52'; Iborra (yellow card) 43'; Krychowiak (yellow card) 45'; Banega (yellow card) 49'; Gameiro 65' (pen.); Sidnei 83' (o.g.); Figueiras (yellow card) 86'	Stadium: Riazor; Attendance: 21,555; Referee: José Teixeira Vitienes (Cantabria)

13 March 2015 27	Valencia	2–0	Deportivo	Valencia
20:45 CET	Rodrigo (yellow card) 44'; Parejo 61' (pen.); Alcácer 72'	Report	Cavaleiro (yellow card) 22'; Luisinho (yellow card) 27'	Stadium: Mestalla; Attendance: 45,000; Referee: Alfonso Álvarez Izquierdo

22 March 2015 28	Deportivo	0–0	Espanyol	A Coruña
12:00 CET	Lopo (yellow card) 33'; Sidnei (yellow card) 39'; Borges (yellow card) 50'; Bergantiños (yellow card) 69'	Report	Sánchez (yellow card) 8'; J. López (yellow card) 31'; Duarte (yellow card) 43'; Álvaro (yellow card) 88'	Stadium: Riazor; Attendance: 19,957; Referee: Fernando Teixeira Vitienes

5 April 2015 29	Getafe	2–1	Deportivo	Getafe
19:00 CEST	Alexis 18'; Escudero 34'; Castro (yellow card) 76'	Report	Cavaleiro (yellow card) 61'; Sidnei (yellow card) 81'; Lucas (yellow card) 90'	Stadium: Coliseum Alfonso Pérez; Attendance: 6,287; Referee: Carlos Clos Gómez

8 April 2015 30	Deportivo	1–1	Córdoba	A Coruña
20:00 CEST	Borges (yellow card) 47'; Luisinho (yellow card) 50' (yellow-red card) 69'; Medunjanin (yellow card) 74'; Juanfran (yellow card) 74'; Andone 87' (o.g.)	Report	Krhin (yellow card) 25'; Andone 55'; Cartabia (yellow card) 73'	Stadium: Riazor; Attendance: 17,602; Referee: Eduardo Prieto Iglesias

12 April 2015 31	Real Sociedad	2–2	Deportivo	San Sebastián
19:00 CEST	Prieto 33' (pen.), (yellow card) 68'; Ansotegi (yellow card) 39'; Castro 58', (yellow card) 63'; Zaldúa (yellow card) 84'	Report	Fabricio (yellow card) 33'; Borges (yellow card) 36'; Lucas 40'; Cavaleiro (yellow card) 72'; Toché 78'; Lopo (yellow card) 85'	Stadium: Anoeta; Attendance: 21,894; Referee: Pedro Pérez Montero

18 April 2015 32	Deportivo	1–2	Atlético Madrid	A Coruña
18:00 CEST	Toché (yellow card) 53'; Sidnei (yellow card) 72'; Riera 78'	Report	Griezmann 5', 22'; Koke (yellow card) 8'; Godín (yellow card) 25'; García (yellow card) 27'; Oblak (yellow card) 80'	Stadium: Riazor; Attendance: 24,693; Referee: David Fernández Borbalán

26 April 2015 33	Málaga	1–1	Deportivo	Málaga
12:00 CEST	Amrabat 47', (yellow card) 71'; Weligton (yellow card) 58'; Sánchez (yellow card) 82'; Recio (yellow card) 88'; Juanmi (yellow card) 90'	Report	Insua (yellow card) 23'; Riera 60'	Stadium: La Rosaleda Stadium; Attendance: 23,851; Referee: Javier Estrada Fernández

29 April 2015 34	Elche	4–0	Deportivo	Elche
22:00 CEST	Jonathas 6'; Lombán 20' (pen.); Pašalić 54'; Suárez (yellow card) 85'; Rodrigues 90'	Report	Lopo (yellow card) 37'; Luisinho (yellow card) 43'	Stadium: Manuel Martínez Valero; Attendance: 19,642; Referee: Alfonso Álvarez Izquierdo

2 May 2015 35	Deportivo	1–1	Villarreal	A Coruña
22:00 CEST	Borges 50'; Riera (yellow card) 68'	Report	Mario (yellow card) 39'; Bailly (yellow card) 45'; Costa 48'; Jokić (yellow card) 62'; Ruiz (yellow card) 74'; Gómez (yellow card) 80'	Stadium: Riazor; Attendance: 20,817; Referee: Alejandro Hernández Hernández

9 May 2015 36	Athletic Bilbao	1–1	Deportivo	Bilbao
22:00 CEST	Aduriz 13', (yellow card) 39'; Laporte (yellow card) 48'; De Marcos (yellow card) 66'; San José (yellow card) 86'	Report	Postiga (yellow card) 78'; Lucas (yellow card) 85'; Borges (yellow card) 90'; Lopo 90', (yellow card) 90'	Stadium: San Mamés; Attendance: 39,670; Referee: Jesús Gil Manzano

17 May 2015 37	Deportivo	2–0	Levante	A Coruña
19:00 CEST	Lopo 21', (yellow card) 77'; Riera (yellow card) 33'; Luisinho (yellow card) 43'; Juanfran 80'	Report	Sissoko (yellow card) 16'; Víctor (yellow card) 59'	Stadium: Riazor; Attendance: 30,251; Referee: José González González

23 May 2015 38	Barcelona	2–2	Deportivo	Barcelona
18:30 CEST	Messi 5', 59'; Mathieu (yellow card) 75'	Report	Domínguez (yellow card) 58'; Lucas 67'; Salomão 76'; Bergantiños (yellow card) 90'; Medunjanin (yellow card) 90'	Stadium: Camp Nou; Attendance: 93,743; Referee: Carlos Clos Gómez

=== Copa del Rey ===
==== Round of 32 ====
3 December 2014 First leg	Deportivo	1–1	Málaga	A Coruña
20:00 CET	Diakité (yellow card) 56'; Toché 68', (yellow card) 77'	Report	Camacho 11'; Angeleri (yellow card) 43'; Rosales (yellow card) 50'; Portillo (yellow card) 88'	Stadium: Riazor; Attendance: 8,700; Referee: Antonio Mateu Lahoz

18 December 2014 Second leg	Málaga	4–1 (5–2 agg.)	Deportivo	Málaga
22:00 CET	Santa Cruz 51', 68'; Recio 59'; Horta (yellow card) 83'; Camacho 89'	Report	Postiga 57'; Lopo (yellow card) 76'	Stadium: La Rosaleda; Attendance: 18,000; Referee: Juan Martínez Munuera

==== Results by round ====
Round	1	2	3	4	5	6	7	8	9	10	11	12	13	14	15	16	17	18	19	20	21	22	23	24	25	26	27	28	29	30	31	32	33	34	35	36	37	38
Ground	A	H	A	H	A	H	A	H	A	H	A	H	A	H	H	A	H	A	H	H	A	H	A	H	A	H	A	H	A	H	A	H	A	A	H	A	H	A
Result	L	D	W	L	L	L	L	W	D	L	D	D	L	L	W	L	W	D	L	D	W	W	L	L	D	L	L	D	L	D	D	L	D	L	D	D	W	D
Position	14	15	9	14	15	17	20	15	16	16	17	18	18	19	16	17	16	16	17	16	14	11	14	15	15	16	16	16	16	16	16	17	17	17	16	16	16	16

Updated to match(es) played on 23 May 2015. Source:
A = Away; H = Home; W = Win; D = Draw; L = Loss
