= 2013–14 Deportivo de La Coruña season =

Deportivo
2013–14 season
- Manager: Fernando Vázquez
- Stadium: Riazor
- Segunda Division: 2nd (Promoted)
- Copa del Rey: Third round
- Top goalscorer: Borja Bastón (10)
- Highest home attendance: 33,639
- Lowest home attendance: 15,672
- Average home league attendance: 22,150
Home colours	Away colours	Third colours

The 2013–14 Deportivo de La Coruña season was the 83rd season in club history and the first season back in the Segunda División following relegation from La Liga.

== Players ==
=== Senior squad ===
Updated 14 March 2014 Note: Flags indicate national team as defined under FIFA eligibility rules; some limited exceptions apply. Players may hold more than one non-FIFA nationality.

No.	Pos.	Nation	Player
1	GK	ARG	Germán Lux
2	DF	ESP	Manuel Pablo (captain)
3	FW	CIV	Ibrahim Sissoko (on loan from VfL Wolfsburg)
4	MF	ESP	Álex Bergantiños
5	DF	ESP	Carlos Marchena
7	MF	ESP	Antonio Núñez
9	FW	ESP	Borja Bastón (on loan from Atlético Madrid)
10	MF	ESP	Juan Domínguez
11	MF	ESP	Javier Arizmendi
13	GK	ESP	Fabricio Agosto
14	MF	CHI	Bryan Rabello (on loan from Sevilla)

No.	Pos.	Nation	Player
15	DF	ESP	Laure (vice-captain)
16	DF	POR	Luisinho
17	FW	POR	Diogo Salomão (on loan from Sporting CP)
18	FW	ESP	Toché
19	FW	URU	Diego Ifrán (on loan from Real Sociedad)
20	MF	POL	Cezary Wilk
22	DF	ESP	Diego Seoane
23	DF	ESP	Alberto Lopo
24	FW	ESP	Luis Fernández
25	MF	ESP	Juan Carlos Real
28	DF	ESP	Pablo Insua

=== From youth team ===
Note: Flags indicate national team as defined under FIFA eligibility rules; some limited exceptions apply. Players may hold more than one non-FIFA nationality.

No.	Pos.	Nation	Player
26	GK	ESP	David Gómez
27	GK	ESP	Marc Martínez
29	DF	ESP	Uxío Marcos
30	MF	ESP	Bicho

No.	Pos.	Nation	Player
32	FW	ESP	Dani Iglesias
33	MF	ESP	Cañi
34	DF	SRB	Stefan Deák
35	DF	ESP	Quique Fornos

=== Out on loan ===
Note: Flags indicate national team as defined under FIFA eligibility rules; some limited exceptions apply. Players may hold more than one non-FIFA nationality.

No.	Pos.	Nation	Player
—	MF	POR	Rudy (to Belenenses until the end of the season)
—	MF	POR	Paulo Teles (to Guijuelo until the end of the season)

== Competitions ==
=== Segunda División ===
==== League table ====
Pos	Team	Pld	W	D	L	GF	GA	GD	Pts	Promotion, qualification or relegation
1	Eibar (C, P)	42	19	14	9	49	28	+21	71	Promotion to La Liga
2	Deportivo La Coruña (P)	42	19	12	11	48	36	+12	69	Promotion to La Liga
3	Barcelona B (Note: Barcelona B could not participate in the play-offs as they are Barcelona's reserve team, so the seventh positioned team qualified for the play-offs.)	42	20	6	16	60	46	+14	66	
4	Murcia (R)	42	16	17	9	55	44	+11	65	Qualification to the promotion play offs and relegation to Segunda División B (Note: Murcia failed to obtain a professional license and were relegated to the Segunda División B by the LFP while Mirandés was re-instated.)
5	Sporting Gijón	42	16	16	10	63	51	+12	64	Qualification to promotion play-offs

Source: LFP - Liga Adelante
Rules for classification: 1st points; 2nd head-to-head points; 3rd head-to-head goal difference; 4th goal difference; 5th number of goals scored.
(C) Champions; (P) Promoted; (R) Relegated

=== Copa del Rey ===
16 October 2013 Third round	Real Jaén	2–0	Deportivo La Coruña	Jaén
19:30	Servando 71'; Juanma 77'	Report		Stadium: Nuevo Estadio de La Victoria; Referee: Trujillo Suárez
