= Martín Mantovani =

Argentine footballer

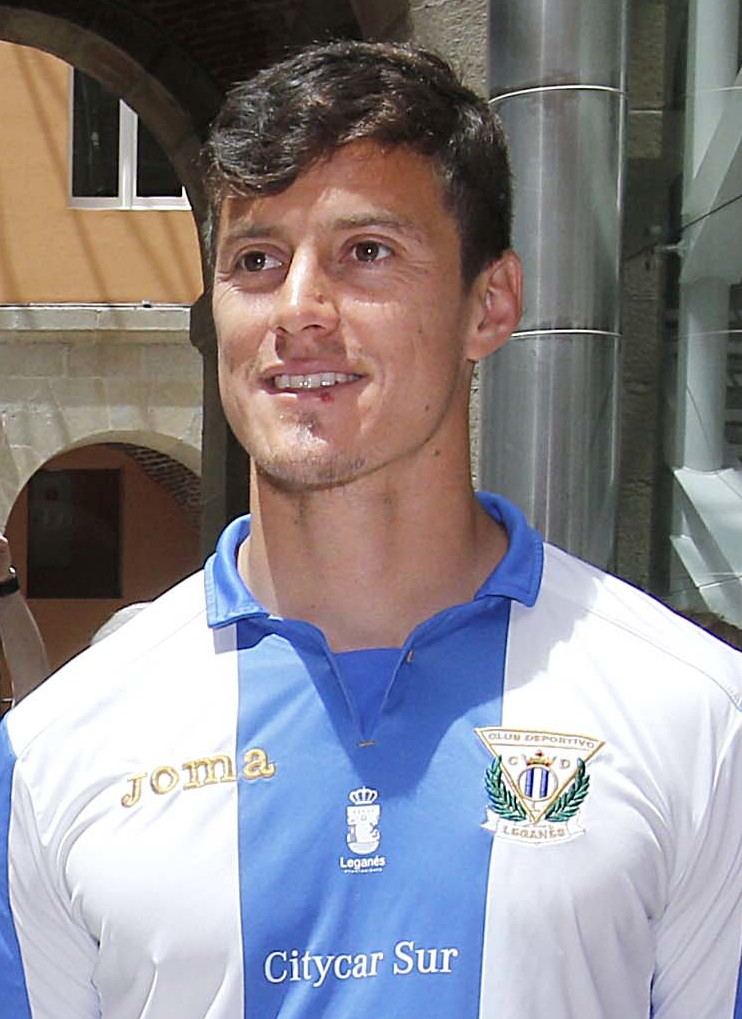
- Mantovani with Leganés in 2016

Personal information
- Full name: Martín Maximiliano Mantovani
- Date of birth: 7 July 1984 (age 42)
- Place of birth: San Miguel, Argentina
- Height: 1.85 m (6 ft 1 in)
- Position: Centre-back

Youth career
- Banfield
- Kimberley
- Cadetes San Martín

Senior career*
Years	Team	Apps	(Gls)
2006–2010	Atlético Madrid C		
2009–2010	Atlético Madrid B	7	(0)
2010–2011	Cultural Leonesa	32	(0)
2011–2012	Atlético Baleares	29	(1)
2012–2014	Oviedo	35	(0)
2013–2014	→ Leganés (loan)	34	(2)
2014–2018	Leganés	117	(9)
2018–2020	Las Palmas	37	(0)
2019	→ Huesca (loan)	9	(2)
2020–2021	Andorra	12	(0)
2021–2022	Móstoles	27	(3)
Total		339	(15)
- * Club domestic league appearances and goals

Martín Maximiliano Mantovani (born 7 July 1984) is an Argentine retired footballer who played as a centre-back.

== Career ==
Born in San Miguel, Corrientes, Mantovani played for local clubs as a youth before joining Atlético Madrid in the 2006 summer. Initially assigned to the C-team, he went on to appear rarely with the reserves in the 2009–10 campaign, in Segunda División B.

On 10 August 2010, Mantovani moved to Cultural y Deportiva Leonesa, also in the third level. He subsequently represented CD Atlético Baleares and Real Oviedo, being an undisputed starter on both sides.

In June 2013, Mantovani was loaned to CD Leganés in the same division. He appeared in 39 matches during the season, as the Madrid side returned to Segunda División after a ten-year absence, and subsequently signed permanently on 30 June 2014.

On 5 October 2014, aged 30, Mantovani played his first match as a professional, starting in a 2–0 home win against CD Tenerife. He scored his first goal late in the month, netting his side's only in a 1–1 away draw against CD Numancia.

Mantovani appeared in 38 matches and scored two goals during the 2015–16 campaign, captaining his side in its first-ever promotion to La Liga. He made his debut in the category on 22 August 2016, starting in a 1–0 away win against Celta de Vigo.

After five seasons at Leganés, Mantovani left the team and signed a two-year contract with UD Las Palmas as a free agent. In March 2019, he joined SD Huesca on loan until the end of the season.

On 5 October 2020, Mantovani terminated his contract with the Canarians.

== Career statistics ==
=== Club ===
As of match played 20 March 2021

Appearances and goals by club, season and competition
Club	Season	League			Cup		Other		Total	
Club	Season	Division	Apps	Goals	Apps	Goals	Apps	Goals	Apps	Goals
Atlético Madrid B	2009–10	Segunda División B	7	0	—		—		7	0
Cultural Leonesa	2010–11	Segunda División B	32	0	0	0	—		32	0
Atlético Baleares	2011–12	Segunda División B	29	1	0	0	3 (Note: Appearance(s) in Promotion Playoffs)	0	32	1
Real Oviedo	2012–13	Segunda División B	35	0	2	0	4	0	41	0
Leganés (loan)	2013–14	Segunda División B	34	2	3	1	5	1	42	4
Leganés	2014–15	Segunda División	34	3	0	0	—		34	3
Leganés	2015–16	Segunda División	38	2	2	0	—		40	2
Leganés	2016–17	La Liga	31	1	1	0	—		32	1
Leganés	2017–18	La Liga	14	1	5	0	—		19	1
Leganés	Total		151	9	11	1	5	1	167	13
Las Palmas	2018–19	Segunda División	12	0	1	0	—		13	0
Las Palmas	2019–20	Segunda División	25	0	0	0	—		25	0
Las Palmas	Total		37	0	1	0	0	0	38	0
Huesca (loan)	2018–19	La Liga	9	2	0	0	—		9	2
Andorra	2020–21	Segunda División B	10	0	0	0	—		10	0
Career total			310	12	14	1	12	1	336	14
