= Marc Martínez (footballer, born 1990) =

Spanish footballer

Personal information
- Full name: Marc Martínez Aranda
- Date of birth: 4 April 1990 (age 36)
- Place of birth: Barcelona, Spain
- Height: 1.86 m (6 ft 1 in)
- Position: Goalkeeper

Team information
- Current team: Lugo
- Number: 1

Youth career
- Barcelona

Senior career*
Years	Team	Apps	(Gls)
2009–2011	Racing Santander B	32	(0)
2011–2013	Deportivo La Coruña B	72	(0)
2013–2014	Elche B	10	(0)
2014	Deportivo La Coruña	0	(0)
2014	Logroñés	0	(0)
2015	Somozas	19	(0)
2015–2017	Alcoyano	63	(0)
2017–2019	Recreativo	76	(0)
2019–2024	Cartagena	126	(0)
2024–2025	Granada	7	(0)
2025–	Lugo	25	(0)
- * Club domestic league appearances and goals as of 9 June 2026

Marc Martínez Aranda (born 4 April 1990) is a Spanish professional footballer who plays as a goalkeeper for Primera Federación club Lugo.

== Club career ==
Born in Barcelona, Catalonia, Martínez was a FC Barcelona youth graduate. On 20 July 2009, he signed for Racing de Santander and was immediately assigned to the reserves in the Segunda División B.

Martínez made his senior debut on 1 November 2009, in a 3–1 away loss against Atlético Madrid B. Third-choice behind Mario Fernández and Pablo Gómez, he only appeared in five matches during the season, which ended in relegation.

On 4 July 2011, Martínez agreed to a contract with another reserve team, Deportivo Fabril of Tercera División. Two years later, the free agent joined Elche CF's B side; he left the latter club in January 2014, and returned to the former as understudy to Fabri due to Germán Lux's injury.

Martínez remained in the third division the following years, representing UD Logroñés, UD Somozas, CD Alcoyano, Recreativo de Huelva and FC Cartagena. He achieved promotion to Segunda División with the latter in 2020, following a penalty shootout win over CD Atlético Baleares.

Martínez played his first professional game on 13 September 2020 at age 30, starting in a 0–0 draw at Real Oviedo. He remained the undisputed starter under Luis Carrión but, with the same manager still in charge, lost his place to Aarón Escandell in the 2022–23 campaign.

On 28 January 2024, Martínez signed an 18-month deal with La Liga club Granada CF for a reported fee of €150,000. On 15 May, as they were already relegated as second-bottom, the 34-year-old made his first appearance in the competition, losing 2–1 away to Rayo Vallecano.

== Career statistics ==
As of match played 24 May 2024

Appearances and goals by club, season and competition
Club	Season	League			Cup		Other		Total	
Club	Season	Division	Apps	Goals	Apps	Goals	Apps	Goals	Apps	Goals
Racing Santander B	2009–10	Segunda División B	5	0	—		—		5	0
Elche	2013–14	La Liga	0	0	0	0	—		0	0
Elche B	2013–14	Segunda División B	10	0	—		—		10	0
Deportivo La Coruña	2013–14	La Liga	0	0	0	0	—		0	0
Logroñés	2014–15	Segunda División B	0	0	—		—		0	0
Somozas	2014–15	Segunda División B	19	0	—		—		19	0
Alcoyano	2015–16	Segunda División B	33	0	0	0	—		33	0
Alcoyano	2016–17	Segunda División B	30	0	0	0	2 (Note: Appearances in Segunda División B play-offs)	0	32	0
Alcoyano	Total		63	0	0	0	2	0	65	0
Recreativo	2017–18	Segunda División B	38	0	—		—		38	0
Recreativo	2018–19	Segunda División B	38	0	—		4	0	42	0
Recreativo	Total		76	0	—		4	0	80	0
Cartagena	2019–20	Segunda División B	28	0	—		1	0	29	0
Cartagena	2020–21	Segunda División	30	0	0	0	—		30	0
Cartagena	2021–22	Segunda División	40	0	0	0	—		40	0
Cartagena	2022–23	Segunda División	7	0	3	0	—		10	0
Cartagena	2023–24	Segunda División	21	0	0	0	—		21	0
Cartagena	Total		126	0	3	0	1	0	130	0
Granada	2023–24	La Liga	3	0	—		—		3	0
Career total			302	0	3	0	7	0	312	0
