= Cezary Wilk =

Polish footballer

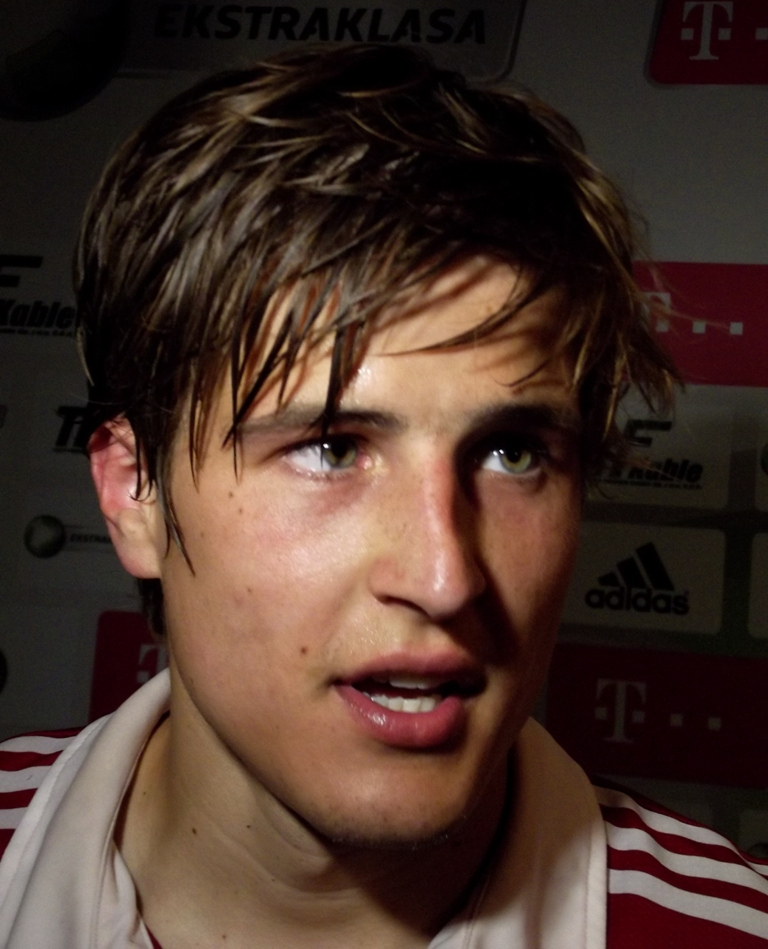

Personal information
- Full name: Cezary Stefan Wilk
- Date of birth: 12 February 1986 (age 40)
- Place of birth: Warsaw, Poland
- Height: 1.80 m (5 ft 11 in)
- Position: Defensive midfielder

Youth career
- 1993–2005: Polonia Warsaw

Senior career*
Years	Team	Apps	(Gls)
2005–2010	Korona Kielce	74	(5)
2007	→ ŁKS Łódź (loan)	14	(0)
2010–2013	Wisła Kraków	78	(4)
2013–2015	Deportivo La Coruña	30	(0)
2015–2018	Zaragoza	11	(1)
Total		207	(10)

International career
2007–2008	Poland U21	11	(1)
2009–2010	Poland U23	7	(1)
2010–2011	Poland	2	(0)
- * Club domestic league appearances and goals

Cezary Stefan Wilk (born 12 February 1986) is a Polish former professional footballer who played as a defensive midfielder.

== Club career ==
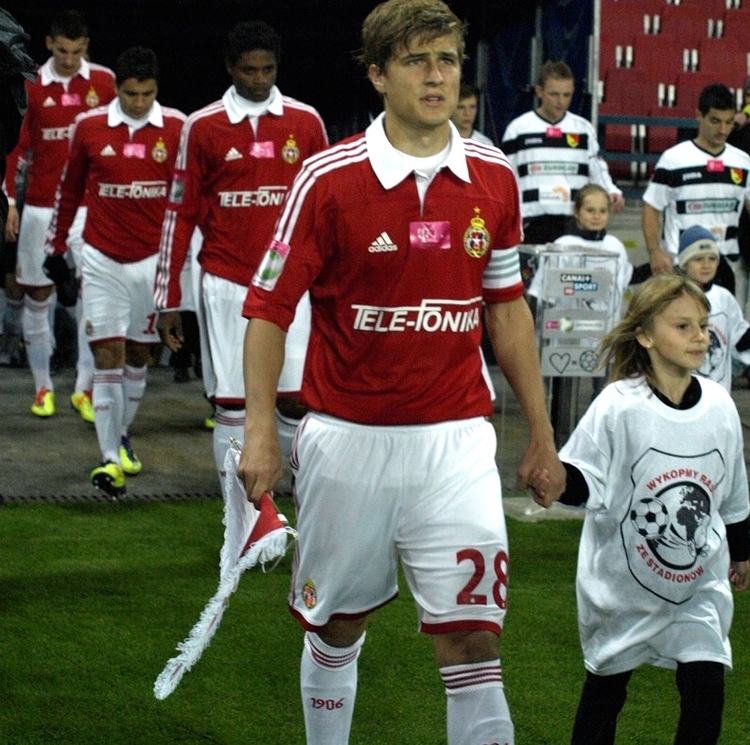
Wilk captaining Wisła Kraków

Wilk was born in Warsaw. He played in hometown's Polonia Warsaw's youth setup, but left the club in 2005 and subsequently joined Korona Kielce. Wilk played his first match as a professional on 15 October 2005, aged 19, and eventually represented his side for five years, playing 74 official games and scoring five goals. In 2007, he was loaned to ŁKS Łódź, appearing in 14 matches during his six-month spell.

In 2010, Wilk agreed to a four-year deal with Wisła Kraków, and was a part of the squad which was crowned champions in the following year. He remained at the club for almost four years and made 106 appearances, scoring 7 goals in all competitions.

On 13 August 2013, Wilk moved abroad for the first time in his career, agreeing to a two-year deal with Spanish Segunda División side Deportivo La Coruña. He appeared in 19 matches as Dépor returned to La Liga at the first attempt.

On 7 July 2015, Wilk joined Real Zaragoza on a two-year contract. On 20 March 2018, after severely struggling with injuries, he announced his retirement.

== International career ==
Having represented Poland at the U-21 and U-23 levels, Wilk was called up in December 2010 to the main squad for a match against Bosnia and Herzegovina. He made his debut on the 10th, replacing Ariel Borysiuk in the 62nd minute of an eventual 2–2 draw.

== Honours ==
Wisła Kraków

- Ekstraklasa: 2010–11

== Statistics ==
As of 12 February 2024

Appearances and goals by club, season and competition
Club	Season	League	League		Domestic cup		Europe		Total	
Club	Season	League	Apps	Goals	Apps	Goals	Apps	Goals	Apps	Goals
Korona Kielce	2005–06	Ekstraklasa	4	0	3	0	—		7	0
Korona Kielce	2006–07	Ekstraklasa	3	0	3	0	—		6	0
Korona Kielce	2007–08	Ekstraklasa	14	0	5	0	—		19	0
Korona Kielce	2008–09	I liga	30	1	0	0	—		30	1
Korona Kielce	2009–10	Ekstraklasa	23	4	4	1	—		27	5
Korona Kielce	Total		74	5	15	1	—		89	6
ŁKS Łódź (loan)	2006–07	Ekstraklasa	14	0	2	0	—		16	0
Wisła Kraków	2010–11	Ekstraklasa	22	3	3	0	1	0	26	3
Wisła Kraków	2011–12	Ekstraklasa	25	0	5	0	13	2	43	2
Wisła Kraków	2012–13	Ekstraklasa	28	1	6	1	—		34	2
Wisła Kraków	2013–14	Ekstraklasa	3	0	—		—		3	0
Wisła Kraków	Total		78	4	14	1	14	2	106	7
Deportivo La Coruña	2013–14	Segunda División	19	0	1	0	—		20	0
Deportivo La Coruña	2014–15	La Liga	11	0	1	0	—		12	0
Deportivo La Coruña	Total		30	0	2	0	—		32	0
Zaragoza	2015–16	Segunda División	9	1	1	0	—		10	1
Zaragoza	2016–17	Segunda División	2	0	1	0	—		3	0
Zaragoza	Total		11	1	2	0	—		13	1
Career total			207	10	35	2	14	2	256	14

== See also ==
- Wilk – people with the surname Wilk
