= Ivan Cavaleiro =

Portuguese footballer (born 1993)

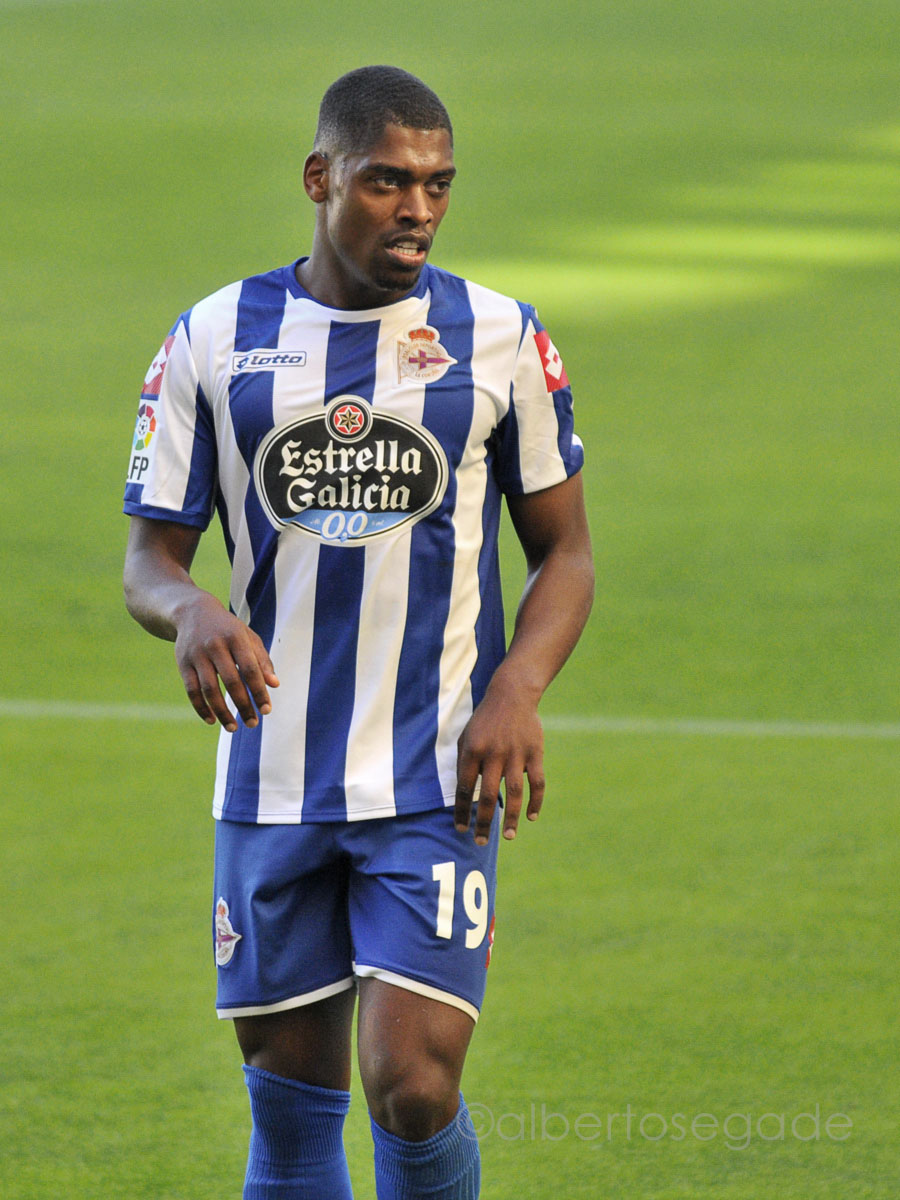
- Cavaleiro playing for Deportivo in 2015

Personal information
- Full name: Ivan Ricardo Neves Abreu Cavaleiro
- Date of birth: 18 October 1993 (age 33)
- Place of birth: Vila Franca de Xira, Portugal
- Height: 1.75 m (5 ft 9 in)
- Positions: Winger; forward

Team information
- Current team: Petro Atlético
- Number: 7

Youth career
- 2004–2005: Vialonga
- 2005–2007: Alverca
- 2007–2012: Benfica
- 2009–2010: → Belenenses (loan)

Senior career*
Years	Team	Apps	(Gls)
2012–2014	Benfica B	56	(22)
2013–2015	Benfica	8	(0)
2014–2015	→ Deportivo La Coruña (loan)	34	(3)
2015–2016	Monaco	14	(1)
2016	Monaco B	1	(1)
2016–2020	Wolverhampton Wanderers	96	(17)
2019–2020	→ Fulham (loan)	25	(5)
2020–2023	Fulham	72	(6)
2022–2023	→ Alanyaspor (loan)	22	(2)
2023–2024	Lille	17	(1)
2024	Red Bull Bragantino	5	(0)
2025	Stal Mielec	6	(2)
2025–2026	Tondela	13	(2)
2026	Zürich	13	(3)
2026–	Petro Atlético	0	(0)

International career
2010	Portugal U17	8	(1)
2011	Portugal U18	4	(0)
2011–2012	Portugal U19	22	(4)
2012–2013	Portugal U20	15	(1)
2013–2015	Portugal U21	14	(7)
2014	Portugal	2	(0)
Medal record
Men's football
Representing Portugal
UEFA European Under-21 Championship
Runner-up	2015
- * Club domestic league appearances and goals as of 26 May 2026

Ivan Ricardo Neves Abreu Cavaleiro (born 18 October 1993) is a Portuguese professional footballer who plays for Girabola club Petro Atlético. Mainly a winger, he can also play as a forward.

A product of Benfica's youth system, he was part of the club's domestic treble in the 2013–14 season. After one-year spells with Deportivo La Coruña (Spain) and Monaco he went on to spend most of his career in England with Wolverhampton Wanderers and Fulham, signing with the former in 2016.

Cavaleiro earned 63 caps for Portugal at youth level across all age groups, scoring 13 goals. He made his senior international debut in 2014.

== Club career ==
=== Benfica ===
Born in Vila Franca de Xira, Lisbon District, Cavaleiro played youth football for five clubs, notably representing S.L. Benfica from ages 13–18, a loan spell notwithstanding. He made his senior debut in the 2012–13 season, playing his first Segunda Liga match with the reserves on 11 August 2012 against S.C. Braga B. The following weekend he scored his first goal(s) as a professional, grabbing a brace in a 4–2 away win over C.D. Feirense, and added another two before the end of the month in a 6–0 home rout of C.F. Os Belenenses; he finished his first year with 38 appearances and 12 goals, helping his team to the seventh position.

Cavaleiro started his second season with Benfica B in fashion, netting seven times in ten matches and earning the Second Division Player of the Month award for August/September. He made his official debut for the main squad on 19 October 2013, playing the full 90 minutes against CD Cinfães in the third round of the Taça de Portugal and assisting Ola John for the game's only goal. He appeared in his maiden match in the UEFA Champions League four days later, playing the second half of a 1–1 home draw with Olympiacos F.C. in the group stage.

On 15 January 2014, Cavaleiro scored his first competitive goal for Benfica, the last in a 2–0 win against Leixões S.C. in that campaign's Taça da Liga. On 7 August, he was loaned to Deportivo de La Coruña of the Spanish La Liga for one year, making his debut on the first matchday and opening the scoring in a 2–1 defeat at Granada CF.

=== Monaco ===
On 10 July 2015, Cavaleiro joined AS Monaco FC on a permanent deal until 2020, for a transfer fee rumoured to be €15 million. He made his debut on the 28th, starting in a 3–1 away win over BSC Young Boys in the Champions League third qualifying round, and scored his first goal in the second leg, opening a 4–0 victory at the Stade Louis II.

=== Wolverhampton Wanderers ===
On 31 August 2016, Cavaleiro moved to English Championship side Wolverhampton Wanderers on a five-year deal (with the option of an additional year) for an undisclosed fee, reported to be a new club-record sum of £7 million. He made his debut on 10 September in a 1–1 home draw to Burton Albion, and scored his first goal for the club 14 days later in a 3–1 win against Brentford also at Molineux Stadium.

Cavaleiro was voted the Professional Footballers' Association Fans' Championship Player of the Month for November 2017, after netting four times in as many games. The previous month, he had provided five assists to keep his team clear at the top of the table; he finished the season with nine goals from 42 appearances, adding 12 decisive passes and achieving promotion to the Premier League as champion.

Cavaleiro's first match in the English top division occurred on 29 September 2018, and he scored once in the 2–0 home victory over Southampton with his very first touch of the ball after coming on as a substitute in place of compatriot Diogo Jota.

=== Fulham ===
Cavaleiro signed for Fulham on 13 July 2019 on a season-long loan, with the option to make the move permanent afterwards. On 21 August, he put on a player of the match performance in the 4–0 home win against Millwall, scoring twice and adding an assist.

On 7 January 2020, Cavaleiro agreed to a permanent four-and-a-half-year contract. In the 2021–22 campaign, as the club returned to the top tier as champions, he dealt with several injury problems.

In September 2022, Cavaleiro was loaned to Alanyaspor of the Turkish Süper Lig for one year.

=== Lille ===
Cavaleiro returned to the French Ligue 1 on 11 August 2023, on a one-year deal at Lille OSC. During his tenure, he scored once from 23 matches.

=== Later career ===
On 19 September 2024, Cavaleiro joined Campeonato Brasileiro Série A club Red Bull Bragantino on a three-month contract. On 3 March 2025, he agreed to a similar deal with Stal Mielec in the Polish Ekstraklasa. He made his debut on 30 March in a 4–1 away loss to Motor Lublin, providing an assist for Stal's consolation goal in injury time.

Cavaleiro returned to Portugal on 19 August 2025 after 11 years away, with the 31-year-old signing a two-year contract at top-division C.D. Tondela. He scored his first goal in the competition 12 days later in a 2–2 home draw against G.D. Estoril Praia, being subsequently voted Player of the Week by website FlashScore.

On 12 June 2026, Cavaleiro joined Girabola's Atlético Petróleos de Luanda from FC Zürich. He scored on his debut on 16 August to help his team to claim the Supertaça de Angola after beating Wiliete S.C. 1–0.

== International career ==
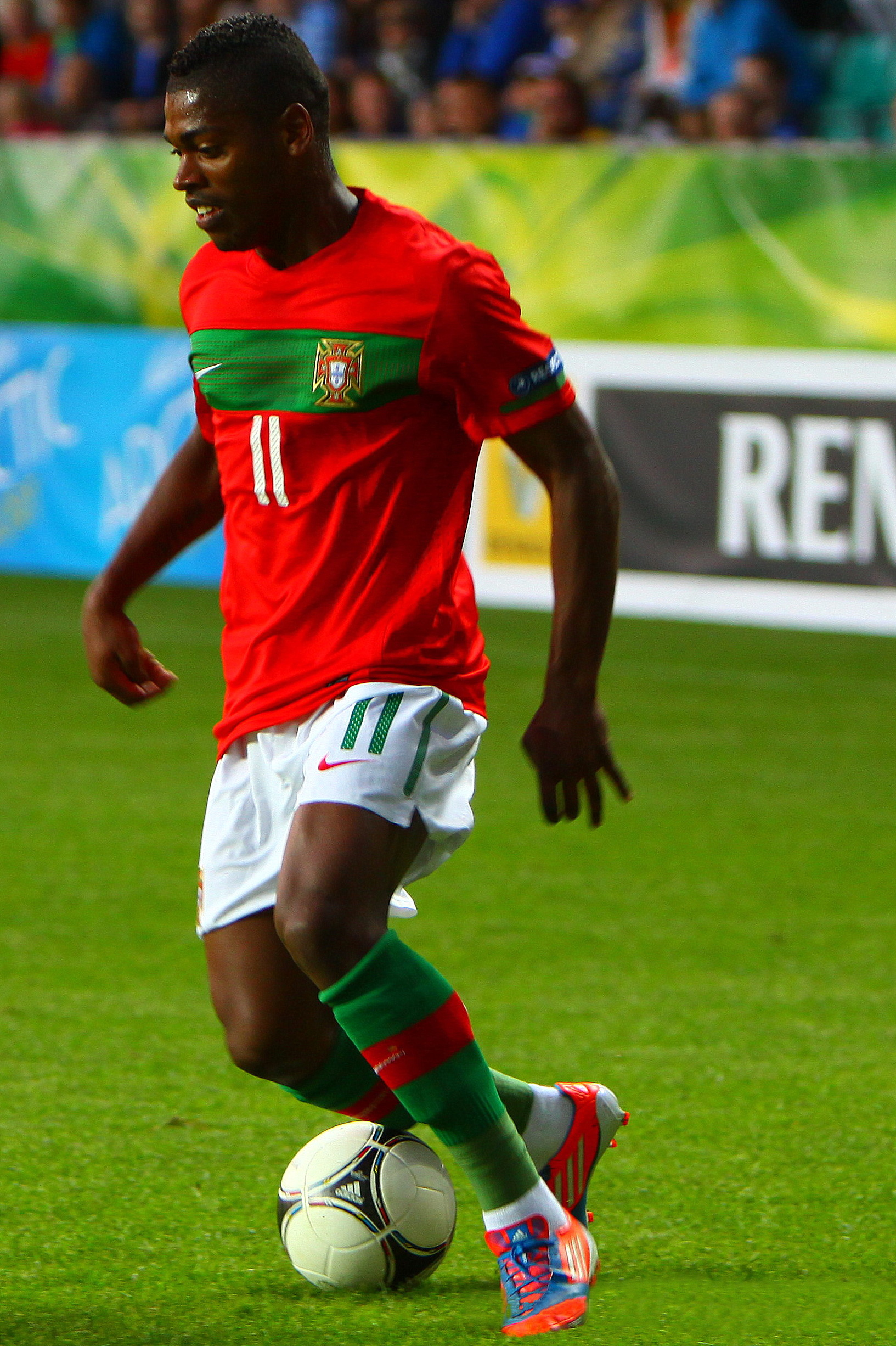
Cavaleiro playing for Portugal U19

=== Youth ===
Cavaleiro was named in the Portugal under-19 squad at the 2012 UEFA European Championship, playing the last match of the group stage against Greece. A year later, he represented the under-20 team at the 2013 FIFA U-20 World Cup; he appeared in four games as a substitute in Turkey, in an eventual round-of-16 exit.

Cavaleiro made his debut for the under-21s on 14 August 2013, netting a hat-trick in a 5–2 friendly win against Switzerland. On 27 June 2015, he scored Portugal's third goal in a 5–0 rout of Germany in the semi-finals of the European Championship in Czech Republic; he was named in the Team of the Tournament, in an eventual runner-up finish.

=== Senior ===
On 28 February 2014, Cavaleiro received his first callup to the Portugal senior side, for a friendly with Cameroon on 5 March. He started and played 70 minutes in the 5–1 victory in Leiria.

Cavaleiro was selected by Angola manager Pedro Gonçalves for 2022 FIFA World Cup qualifiers against Egypt and Libya on 2 and 7 September 2021, respectively. He was not included in the final squad, however.

== Personal life ==
Cavaleiro's father, Lindo, was crowned Angolan youth champion for Atlético Petróleos de Luanda, whilst his uncle Monhé excelled as a midfielder for Progresso Associação do Sambizanga.

== Career statistics ==
=== Club ===
As of match played 12 May 2025

Appearances and goals by club, season and competition
Club	Season	League			National cup (Note: Includes Taça de Portugal, Copa del Rey, Coupe de France, FA Cup, Turkish Cup)		League cup (Note: Includes Taça da Liga, Coupe de la Ligue, EFL Cup)		Other		Total	
Club	Season	Division	Apps	Goals	Apps	Goals	Apps	Goals	Apps	Goals	Apps	Goals
Benfica B	2012–13	Segunda Liga	38	12	—		—		—		38	12
Benfica B	2013–14	Segunda Liga	18	10	—		—		—		18	10
Benfica B	Total		56	22	—		—		—		56	22
Benfica	2013–14	Primeira Liga	8	0	3	0	3	1	6 (Note: Four appearances in UEFA Champions League, two appearances in UEFA Europa League)	0	20	1
Deportivo La Coruña (loan)	2014–15	La Liga	34	3	0	0	—		—		34	3
Monaco	2015–16	Ligue 1	12	1	0	0	1	0	6 (Note: Four appearances and one goal in Champions League, two appearances and one goal in Europa League)	2	19	3
Monaco	2016–17	Ligue 1	2	0	0	0	0	0	1	0	3	0
Monaco	Total		14	1	0	0	1	0	7	2	22	3
Monaco B	2015–16	CFA	1	1	—		—		—		1	1
Wolverhampton Wanderers	2016–17	Championship	31	5	0	0	0	0	—		31	5
Wolverhampton Wanderers	2017–18	Championship	42	9	1	0	3	0	—		46	9
Wolverhampton Wanderers	2018–19	Premier League	23	3	5	2	1	0	—		29	5
Wolverhampton Wanderers	Total		96	17	6	2	4	0	—		106	19
Fulham (loan)	2019–20	Championship	25	5	1	0	0	0	—		26	5
Fulham	2019–20	Championship	18	1	1	0	0	0	1 (Note: Appearance in EFL Championship play-offs)	0	20	1
Fulham	2020–21	Premier League	36	3	1	0	0	0	—		37	3
Fulham	2021–22	Championship	18	2	0	0	2	1	—		20	3
Fulham	Total		97	11	3	0	2	1	1	0	103	12
Alanyaspor (loan)	2022–23	Süper Lig	22	2	3	2	—		—		25	4
Lille	2023–24	Ligue 1	17	1	0	0	—		6 (Note: Appearances in UEFA Europa Conference League)	0	23	1
Red Bull Bragantino	2024	Série A	5	0	—		—		—		5	0
Stal Mielec	2024–25	Ekstraklasa	6	2	—		—		—		6	2
Career total			356	60	15	4	10	2	20	2	401	68

=== International ===
Appearances and goals by national team and year
National team	Year	Apps	Goals
Portugal
Portugal	2014	2	0
Total		2	0

== Honours ==
Benfica

- Primeira Liga: 2013–14
- Taça de Portugal: 2013–14
- Taça da Liga: 2013–14
- UEFA Europa League runner-up: 2013–14

Wolverhampton Wanderers

- EFL Championship: 2017–18

Fulham

- EFL Championship: 2021–22; play-offs: 2020

Petro Atlético

- Supertaça de Angola: 2026

Portugal U21

- UEFA European Under-21 Championship runner-up: 2015

Individual

- SJPF Segunda Liga Player of the Month: August 2013, September 2013
- UEFA European Under-21 Championship Team of the tournament: 2015
- Professional Footballers' Association Fans' Championship Player of the Month: November 2017
