= Pablo Insua =

Spanish footballer

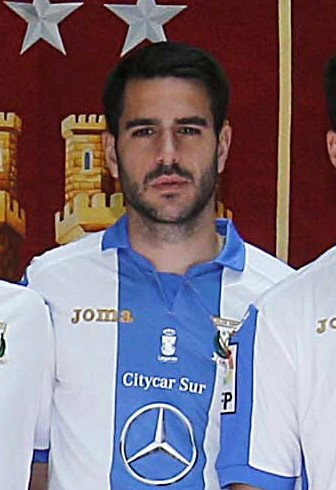
- Insua with Leganés in 2016

Personal information
- Full name: Pablo Insua Blanco
- Date of birth: 9 September 1993 (age 33)
- Place of birth: Arzúa, Spain
- Height: 1.87 m (6 ft 2 in)
- Position: Centre-back

Youth career
- 2005–2010: Deportivo La Coruña

Senior career*
Years	Team	Apps	(Gls)
2010–2012	Deportivo B	60	(0)
2012–2017	Deportivo La Coruña	59	(3)
2015–2017	→ Leganés (loan)	64	(2)
2017–2020	Schalke 04	1	(0)
2018–2020	→ Huesca (loan)	17	(0)
2020–2022	Huesca	40	(0)
2022–2024	Sporting Gijón	66	(4)
2024–2025	Granada	15	(1)
2025–2026	Zaragoza	30	(0)

International career
2012	Spain U19	5	(0)
2012–2013	Spain U20	4	(0)
- * Club domestic league appearances and goals as of 31 May 2026

Pablo Insua Blanco (born 9 September 1993) is a Spanish professional footballer who plays as a central defender.

== Club career ==
=== Deportivo ===
Born in Arzúa, Province of A Coruña, Insua was a youth product of local Deportivo de La Coruña. He made his debut as a senior with the reserves, representing them in both the Segunda División B and the Tercera División.

Insua made his official debut for the Galicians' first team on 25 November 2012, playing the last ten minutes of the 1–1 La Liga away draw against Athletic Bilbao. On 17 August of the following year, with the club again in the Segunda División, he scored his first professional goal, the only in a win at UD Las Palmas.

Insua renewed with Depor on 25 March 2014, signing until 2018. He was an ever-present figure during the season, appearing in 39 matches and scoring three goals as his team returned to the top flight at the first attempt.

=== Leganés ===
On 15 August 2015, Insua was loaned to CD Leganés of the second tier for one year. He scored once from 35 games in his first year, helping to a first ever top-division promotion.

Insúa's loan was renewed for a further season on 15 July 2016. He scored his only goal in the Spanish top tier on 21 January 2017, equalising a 2–2 away draw with Deportivo Alavés.

=== Schalke 04 ===
On 29 June 2017, after contributing 29 appearances as Leganés retained their newly acquired status, Insua signed with FC Schalke 04 on a four-year deal for an undisclosed fee. In September, he suffered myocarditis which kept him out of play for months until he returned to training in January 2018. His Bundesliga debut occurred on 17 March, when he came on as a 64th-minute substitute in the 1–0 away defeat of VfL Wolfsburg.

=== Huesca ===
On 20 July 2018, Insua joined SD Huesca on a season-long loan. On 21 August 2019, the move was extended for another year.

Insua agreed to a permanent three-year contract on 1 August 2020, after the club exercised their option to buy. On 2 July 2022, his link was terminated.

=== Later career ===
On 4 July 2022, Insua signed a two-year deal with Sporting de Gijón. In June 2024, he moved to fellow second-tier Granada CF on a contract of the same duration, but left on 22 August 2025.

On 25 August 2025, Insua remained in the league by joining Real Zaragoza on a one-year contract.

== Career statistics ==
As of 25 April 2021

Club	Season	League			Cup		Europe		Total	
Club	Season	Division	Apps	Goals	Apps	Goals	Apps	Goals	Apps	Goals
Deportivo	2012–13	La Liga	3	0	1	0	—		4	0
Deportivo	2013–14	Segunda División	39	3	1	0	—		40	3
Deportivo	2014–15	La Liga	17	0	1	0	—		18	0
Deportivo	Total		59	3	3	0	—		62	3
Leganés (loan)	2015–16	Segunda División	35	1	3	0	—		38	1
Leganés (loan)	2016–17	La Liga	29	1	1	0	—		30	1
Leganés (loan)	Total		64	2	4	0	—		68	2
Schalke 04	2017–18	Bundesliga	1	0	0	0	—		1	0
Huesca (loan)	2018–19	La Liga	10	0	2	0	—		12	0
Huesca (loan)	2019–20	Segunda División	7	0	2	0	—		9	0
Huesca	2020–21	La Liga	20	0	1	0	—		21	0
Huesca	Total		37	0	5	0	—		42	0
Career total			161	5	12	0	0	0	173	5

== Honours ==
Huesca

- Segunda División: 2019–20

Spain U19

- UEFA European Under-19 Championship: 2012
