= Marcos Remeseiro =

Spanish footballer (born 1992)

Personal information
- Full name: Marcos Remeseiro Conde
- Date of birth: 21 July 1992 (age 34)
- Place of birth: A Coruña, Spain
- Height: 1.80 m (5 ft 11 in)
- Position: Attacking midfielder

Team information
- Current team: Arosa

Youth career
- Ural
- 2009–2011: Racing Ferrol

Senior career*
Years	Team	Apps	(Gls)
2010–2011	Racing Ferrol	3	(0)
2011	→ Galicia Mugardos (loan)		
2011–2013	Cerceda	53	(6)
2013–2015	Deportivo B	62	(24)
2014	Deportivo La Coruña	0	(0)
2015–2016	Somozas	35	(0)
2016–2017	Oviedo B	33	(11)
2017–2018	Boiro	36	(5)
2018–2019	Compostela	33	(2)
2019–2025	Bergantiños	188	(29)
2025–	Arosa	4	(0)
- * Club domestic league appearances and goals as of 28 September 2025

Marcos Remeseiro Conde (born 21 July 1992) is a Spanish footballer who plays for Tercera Federación club Arosa as an attacking midfielder.

== Club career ==
Born in A Coruña, Galicia, Remeseiro joined Racing de Ferrol's youth setup in January 2009, after starting it out at local Ural CF. He made his debuts as a senior in the 2009–10 campaign in Segunda División B, appearing in three matches as a substitute.

On 19 April 2011 Remeseiro was loaned to SDC Galicia Mugardos, until June. Shortly after his return he rescinded his link, and joined Tercera División's CCD Cerceda.

On 19 July 2013 Remeseiro moved to Deportivo de La Coruña, also in the fourth level. He made his first team debut on 3 December of the following year, replacing Juan Carlos in the 67th minute of a 1–1 home draw against Málaga CF, for the season's Copa del Rey.
