= David Ferreiro =

Spanish footballer (born 1988)

Personal information
- Full name: David Ferreiro Quiroga
- Date of birth: 1 April 1988 (age 38)
- Place of birth: Baños de Molgas, Spain
- Height: 1.70 m (5 ft 7 in)
- Position: Winger

Team information
- Current team: UD Ourense

Youth career
- Nogueira
- Pabellón Ourense

Senior career*
Years	Team	Apps	(Gls)
2006–2007	CD Ourense B		
2007–2008	CD Ourense	36	(4)
2008–2009	Atlético Ciudad	23	(1)
2009–2011	Zamora	72	(8)
2011–2014	Granada	0	(0)
2011–2012	→ Cádiz (loan)	33	(8)
2012–2013	→ Racing Santander (loan)	35	(1)
2013–2014	→ Hércules (loan)	35	(2)
2014–2016	Lugo	73	(2)
2016–2022	Huesca	211	(12)
2022–2024	Cartagena	25	(0)
2024	Málaga	16	(3)
2024–2026	Arenteiro	69	(4)
2026–	UD Ourense	10	(0)
- * Club domestic league appearances and goals as of 13:25, 16 November 2026 (UTC)

David Ferreiro Quiroga (born 1 April 1988) is a Spanish professional footballer who plays mainly as a winger for Primera Federación club UD Ourense.

== Club career ==
Born in Baños de Molgas, Province of Ourense, Galicia, Ferreiro finished his development at Pabellón Ourense after starting out at Nogueira de Ramuín. In 2006, he signed with CD Ourense: initially assigned to the reserves in the Tercera División, he became a regular starter for the first team during the 2007–08 season, which ended in relegation from Segunda División B.

Ferreiro continued to compete in the third division the following years, representing Atlético Ciudad and Zamora. On 2 August 2011, he signed a contract with Granada who paid his buyout clause of €20,000, and was immediately loaned to Cádiz.

In the summer of 2012, still owned by Granada, Ferreiro joined Racing de Santander. He made his Segunda División debut on 19 August, starting in a 0–1 home loss against Las Palmas. His only goal of the campaign, which ended in relegation, came on 12 May of the following year in the 1–0 home defeat of Real Madrid Castilla.

In the 2014 off-season, after a third loan to Hércules, Ferreiro was released by Granada and moved to Lugo also in the third tier. He signed with Huesca of the same league on 20 June 2016, achieving promotion to La Liga at the end of 2017–18.

Ferreiro made his debut in the Spanish top flight on 19 August 2018, coming on as a 90th-minute substitute for Damián Musto in a 2–1 away win against Eibar. He scored his first goal in the competition the following 5 January, equalising an eventual 2–1 home victory over Real Betis.

On 3 July 2022, Ferreiro terminated his contract with Huesca, leaving the club with 216 competitive appearances to his credit. The following day, the 34-year-old joined second-division Cartagena on a two-year deal.

From January 2024 onwards, Ferreiro played in the Primera Federación, with Málaga, Arenteiro and UD Ourense.

== Honours ==
Huesca

- Segunda División: 2019–20
