= Cañi (footballer) =

Spanish footballer

Personal information
- Full name: Jesús Cañizares Sánchez
- Date of birth: 21 April 1992 (age 34)
- Place of birth: As Pontes, Spain
- Height: 1.74 m (5 ft 9 in)
- Position: Attacking midfielder

Team information
- Current team: Xerez CD

Youth career
- As Pontes
- 2010–2011: → Racing Ferrol (loan)

Senior career*
Years	Team	Apps	(Gls)
2011–2013	As Pontes		(6)
2013–2015	Deportivo B	67	(12)
2013	Deportivo La Coruña	0	(0)
2015–2016	As Pontes	33	(6)
2016–2017	Cerceda	36	(3)
2017–	Silva	13	(9)
- * Club domestic league appearances and goals as of 5 November 2017

Jesús Cañizares Sánchez (born 21 April 1992), best known as Cañi, is a Spanish footballer who plays for Xerez CD as an attacking midfielder.

== Club career ==
Born in As Pontes, Cañi was a youth product of local CD As Pontes. He made his debuts as a senior in 2011–12 season, representing the side in Tercera División. On 21 May 2013 he signed a two-year deal with Deportivo de La Coruña, being initially assigned to the reserves also in the fourth level.

Cañi made his official debut for the Galicians' first team on 12 September 2013, starting in a 2–2 away draw against Córdoba CF, for the season's Copa del Rey.
