= Damián Musto =

Argentinian association football player

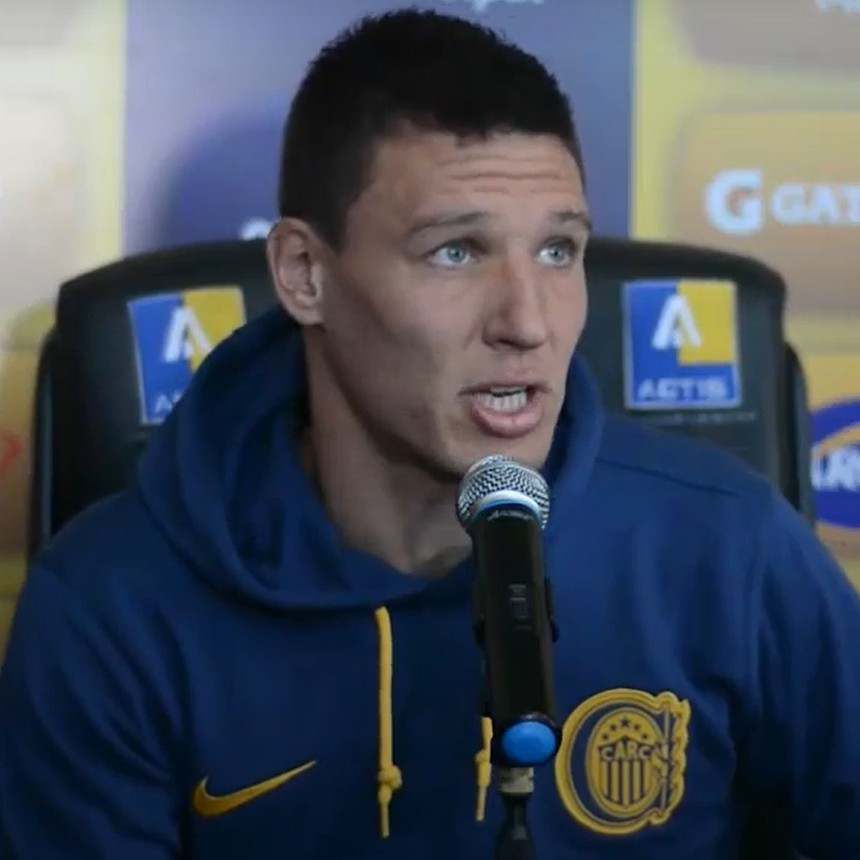

Personal information
- Full name: Damián Marcelo Musto
- Date of birth: 9 June 1987 (age 39)
- Place of birth: Casilda, Argentina
- Height: 1.82 m (6 ft 0 in)
- Position: Midfielder

Team information
- Current team: Alumni

Youth career
- Alumni de Casilda
- 2005–2006: Quilmes

Senior career*
Years	Team	Apps	(Gls)
2006–2008	Quilmes	44	(1)
2008–2010	Atlético Tucumán	56	(0)
2010–2011	Spezia	14	(0)
2011–2015	Olimpo	92	(5)
2014–2015	→ Rosario Central (loan)	36	(1)
2016–2017	Rosario Central	33	(1)
2017–2019	Tijuana	29	(1)
2018–2019	→ Huesca (loan)	22	(0)
2019–2020	Huesca	0	(0)
2020	→ Internacional (loan)	14	(1)
2021–2022	Peñarol	41	(0)
2022–2025	Cartagena	97	(1)
2025–	Alumni	0	(0)
- * Club domestic league appearances and goals as of 2 April 2025

Damián Marcelo Musto (born 9 June 1987) is an Argentine former footballer who played as a midfielder. He is currently part of Eduardo Coudet's coaching staff at River Plate.

== Club career ==
=== Early career ===
Born in Casilda, Musto joined Quilmes' youth setup in 2005, from hometown side Alumni. He made his senior debut during the 2006–07 season, suffering relegation from Primera División.

In 2008, Musto joined Primera B Nacional side Atlético Tucumán. He was viewed as a midfielder with strong marking style, comparable to that of Pablo Guiñazú. He featured regularly during his two-year spell at the club, achieving promotion to the first division in his first campaign.

On 13 July 2010, Musto signed for Lega Pro Prima Divisione club Spezia. After appearing sparingly, he returned to his home country after agreeing to a contract with Olimpo.

=== Rosario Central ===
On 29 July 2015, Musto was loaned to Rosario Central for 18 months, with a buyout clause. He made his debut for the club on 9 August, in a 3–1 win against former club Quilmes.

=== Tijuana ===
On 3 July 2017, Musto joined Tijuana on a 2 million dollar move for a three-years contract. Musto scoring his first goal with the club on August 25, 2017, scoring the late winner goal in the 87 min against Pachuca ending in a 2–1 win.

=== Huesca ===
On 14 July 2018, Musto was loaned to La Liga side Huesca for one season, with an obligatory buyout clause.

==== Internacional (loan) ====
On 30 December 2019, Musto joined Internacional on loan from Huesca until the end of the 2020 season.
