= List of Spanish football transfers winter 2022–23 =

This is a list of Spanish football transfers for the winter sale prior to the 2022–23 season of La Liga and Segunda División. Only moves from La Liga and Segunda División are listed.

== La Liga ==
=== Almería ===
==== In ====
| Date | Player | From | Type | Fee | Ref |
|---|---|---|---|---|---|
| 5 December 2022 | (Colombia) Luis Suárez | (France) Marseille | Loan | | |
| 30 December 2022 | (England) Arvin Appiah | Tenerife | Loan return | | |
| 25 January 2023 | (Spain) Diego Mariño | Sporting Gijón | Transfer | Undisclosed | |

==== Out ====
| Date | Player | To | Type | Fee | Ref |
|---|---|---|---|---|---|
| 9 January 2023 | (England) Arvin Appiah | Málaga | Loan | | |
| 19 January 2023 | (Spain) Iván Martos | Cartagena | Loan | | |
| 31 January 2023 | (Spain) Javi Robles | Released | | | |
| 1 February 2023 | (Spain) Fernando Pacheco | Espanyol | Transfer | Undisclosed | |
| 3 February 2023 | (Portugal) Gui Guedes | Lugo | Loan | | |

=== Athletic Bilbao ===
==== In ====
| Date | Player | From | Type | Fee | Ref |
|---|---|---|---|---|---|
| 1 February 2023 | (Spain) Ander Herrera | (France) Paris Saint-Germain | Buyout clause | Undisclosed | |

==== Out ====
| Date | Player | To | Type | Fee | Ref |
|---|---|---|---|---|---|
| 30 January 2023 | (Spain) Asier Villalibre | Alavés | Loan | | |

=== Atlético Madrid ===
==== In ====
| Date | Player | From | Type | Fee | Ref |
|---|---|---|---|---|---|
| 10 October 2022 | (France) Antoine Griezmann | Barcelona | Transfer | Undisclosed | |
| 28 December 2022 | (Portugal) Marcos Paulo | Mirandés | Loan return | | |
| 20 January 2023 | (Netherlands) Memphis Depay | Barcelona | Transfer | €3m | |
| 31 January 2023 | (Republic of Ireland) Matt Doherty | (England) Tottenham Hotspur | Transfer | Free | |
| 31 January 2023 | (Spain) Javi Serrano | Mirandés | Loan return | | |

==== Out ====
| Date | Player | To | Type | Fee | Ref |
|---|---|---|---|---|---|
| 26 December 2022 | (Brazil) Matheus Cunha | (England) Wolverhampton Wanderers | Loan | | |
| 28 December 2022 | (Portugal) Marcos Paulo | (Brazil) São Paulo | Loan | | |
| 11 January 2023 | (Portugal) João Félix | (England) Chelsea | Loan | | |
| 31 January 2023 | (Brazil) Felipe | (England) Nottingham Forest | Transfer | Undisclosed | |
| 31 January 2023 | (Spain) Javi Serrano | Ibiza | Loan | | |

=== Barcelona ===
==== In ====
| Date | Player | From | Type | Fee | Ref |

==== Out ====
| Date | Player | To | Type | Fee | Ref |
|---|---|---|---|---|---|
| 10 October 2022 | (France) Antoine Griezmann | Atlético Madrid | Transfer | Undisclosed | |
| 3 November 2022 | (Spain) Gerard Piqué | Retired | | | |
| 20 January 2023 | (Netherlands) Memphis Depay | Atlético Madrid | Transfer | €3m | |
| 20 January 2023 | (Spain) Álvaro Sanz | Mirandés | Transfer | Free | |
| 31 January 2023 | (Spain) Héctor Bellerín | (Portugal) Sporting CP | Transfer | Undisclosed | |
| 31 January 2023 | (Turkey) Emre Demir | (Turkey) Fenerbahçe | Transfer | Free | |
| 31 January 2023 | (Spain) Àlex Valle | Andorra | Loan | | |

=== Betis ===
==== In ====
| Date | Player | From | Type | Fee | Ref |
|---|---|---|---|---|---|
| 15 January 2023 | (Brazil) Abner Vinícius | (Brazil) Athletico Paranaense | Transfer | Undisclosed | |
| 31 January 2023 | (Spain) Ayoze Pérez | (England) Leicester City | Loan | | |

==== Out ====
| Date | Player | To | Type | Fee | Ref |
|---|---|---|---|---|---|
| 11 January 2023 | (Spain) Álex Moreno | (England) Aston Villa | Transfer | £13.2m | |
| 30 January 2023 | (Mexico) Diego Lainez | (Mexico) Tigres | Loan | | |
| 31 January 2023 | (Spain) Víctor Camarasa | Released | | | |
| 31 January 2023 | (Spain) Loren | Las Palmas | Loan | | |

=== Cádiz ===
==== In ====
| Date | Player | From | Type | Fee | Ref |
|---|---|---|---|---|---|
| 26 December 2022 | (Spain) Raúl Parra | Mirandés | Loan return | | |
| 27 December 2022 | (Mali) Youba Diarra | (Austria) Red Bull Salzburg | Transfer | Undisclosed | |
| 25 January 2023 | (Argentina) Gonzalo Escalante | (Italy) Lazio | Loan | | |
| 26 January 2023 | (Spain) Roger Martí | Elche | Loan | | |
| 31 January 2023 | (Spain) Sergi Guardiola | Valladolid | Loan | | |
| 31 January 2023 | (Spain) Jorge Meré | (Mexico) Club América | Loan | | |
| 1 February 2023 | (Spain) Chris Ramos | Lugo | Transfer | Undisclosed | |

==== Out ====
| Date | Player | To | Type | Fee | Ref |
|---|---|---|---|---|---|
| 27 December 2022 | (Chile) Tomás Alarcón | Zaragoza | Loan | | |
| 31 December 2022 | (Spain) Lucas Pérez | Deportivo La Coruña | Transfer | €1m | |
| 3 January 2023 | (Australia) Awer Mabil | (Czech Republic) Sparta Prague | Loan | | |
| 12 January 2023 | (Spain) Antonio Blanco | Real Madrid | Loan return | | |
| 1 February 2023 | (Spain) Álvaro Giménez | Released | | | |

=== Celta Vigo ===
==== In ====
| Date | Player | From | Type | Fee | Ref |
|---|---|---|---|---|---|
| 30 January 2023 | (Spain) Alfon | Racing Santander | Loan return | | |
| 31 January 2023 | (Serbia) Haris Seferovic | (Portugal) Benfica | Loan | | |

==== Out ====
| Date | Player | To | Type | Fee | Ref |
|---|---|---|---|---|---|
| 30 January 2023 | (Spain) Alfon | Real Murcia | Loan | | |
| 31 January 2023 | (Spain) Denis Suárez | Espanyol | Loan | | |

=== Elche ===
==== In ====
| Date | Player | From | Type | Fee | Ref |
|---|---|---|---|---|---|
| 5 January 2023 | (Argentina) Lisandro Magallán | (Netherlands) Ajax | Transfer | Undisclosed | |
| 11 January 2023 | (Spain) José Ángel Carmona | Sevilla | Loan | | |
| 1 February 2023 | (France) Randy Nteka | Rayo Vallecano | Loan | | |

==== Out ====
| Date | Player | To | Type | Fee | Ref |
|---|---|---|---|---|---|
| 7 January 2023 | (Argentina) Javier Pastore | Released | | | |
| 26 January 2023 | (Spain) Roger Martí | Cádiz | Loan | | |

=== Espanyol ===
==== In ====
| Date | Player | From | Type | Fee | Ref |
|---|---|---|---|---|---|
| 27 December 2022 | (Mexico) César Montes | (Mexico) Monterrey | Transfer | Undisclosed | |
| 5 January 2023 | (Spain) Miguelón | Oviedo | Loan return | | |
| 18 January 2023 | (France) Ronaël Pierre-Gabriel | (Germany) Mainz 05 | Loan | | |
| 31 January 2023 | (Spain) Denis Suárez | Celta Vigo | Loan | | |
| 1 February 2023 | (Spain) Fernando Pacheco | Almería | Transfer | Undisclosed | |

==== Out ====
| Date | Player | To | Type | Fee | Ref |
|---|---|---|---|---|---|
| 5 January 2023 | (Spain) Miguelón | Cartagena | Loan | | |
| 26 January 2023 | (France) Benjamin Lecomte | (France) Monaco | Loan return | | |
| 30 January 2023 | (Spain) Pol Lozano | Granada | Loan | | |
| 31 January 2023 | (Spain) Álvaro García | Fuenlabrada | Loan | | |

=== Getafe ===
==== In ====
| Date | Player | From | Type | Fee | Ref |
|---|---|---|---|---|---|
| 13 January 2023 | (Spain) Gonzalo Villar | (Italy) Roma | Loan | | |
| 19 January 2023 | (Spain) Darío Poveda | Ibiza | Loan return | | |

==== Out ====
| Date | Player | To | Type | Fee | Ref |
|---|---|---|---|---|---|
| 19 January 2023 | (Spain) Darío Poveda | Cartagena | Loan | | |

=== Girona ===
==== In ====
| Date | Player | From | Type | Fee | Ref |
|---|---|---|---|---|---|
| 17 January 2023 | (Ukraine) Viktor Tsyhankov | (Ukraine) Dynamo Kyiv | Transfer | Undisclosed | |
| 23 January 2023 | (Peru) Alexander Callens | (United States) New York City | Transfer | Free | |

==== Out ====
| Date | Player | To | Type | Fee | Ref |
|---|---|---|---|---|---|
| 16 January 2023 | (Spain) Oscar Ureña | Cartagena | Loan | | |
| 18 January 2023 | (Spain) Ramon Terrats | Villarreal B | Loan | | |
| 27 January 2023 | (Spain) Manu Vallejo | Oviedo | Loan | | |

=== Mallorca ===
==== In ====
| Date | Player | From | Type | Fee | Ref |
|---|---|---|---|---|---|
| 18 January 2023 | (Bosnia and Herzegovina) Dennis Hadžikadunić | (Russia) Rostov | Loan | | |
| 30 January 2023 | (Sweden) Ludwig Augustinsson | Sevilla | Loan | | |
| 31 January 2023 | (Colombia) Daniel Luna | (Colombia) Deportivo Cali | Loan | | |
| 31 January 2023 | (Spain) Manu Morlanes | Villarreal | Loan | | |

==== Out ====
| Date | Player | To | Type | Fee | Ref |
|---|---|---|---|---|---|
| 11 January 2023 | (Ivory Coast) Lago Junior | Released | | | |
| 16 January 2023 | (Argentina) Franco Russo | (Bulgaria) Ludogorets Razgrad | Transfer | Undisclosed | |
| 18 January 2023 | (Spain) Javier Llabrés | Mirandés | Loan | | |
| 31 January 2023 | (Spain) Álex Alegría | Released | | | |
| 3 February 2023 | (Argentina) Braian Cufré | (United States) New York CIty | Loan | | |

=== Osasuna ===
==== In ====
| Date | Player | From | Type | Fee | Ref |
|---|---|---|---|---|---|
| 31 January 2023 | (Spain) Javi Martínez | Albacete | Loan return | | |

==== Out ====
| Date | Player | To | Type | Fee | Ref |
|---|---|---|---|---|---|
| 29 December 2022 | (Spain) Roberto Torres | Released | | | |
| 20 January 2023 | (Spain) Juan Pérez | Huesca | Transfer | Undisclosed | |
| 22 January 2023 | (Spain) Kike Saverio | Released | | | |
| 31 January 2023 | (Spain) Javi Martínez | Huesca | Loan | | |

=== Rayo Vallecano ===
==== In ====
| Date | Player | from | Type | Fee | Ref |

==== Out ====
| Date | Player | to | Type | Fee | Ref |
|---|---|---|---|---|---|
| 31 January 2023 | (Cape Verde) Bebé | Zaragoza | Loan | | |
| 1 February 2023 | (France) Randy Nteka | Elche | Loan | | |

=== Real Madrid ===
==== In ====
| Date | Player | From | Type | Fee | Ref |
|---|---|---|---|---|---|
| 12 January 2023 | (Spain) Antonio Blanco | Cádiz | Loan return | | |

==== Out ====
| Date | Player | To | Type | Fee | Ref |
|---|---|---|---|---|---|
| 12 January 2023 | (Spain) Antonio Blanco | Alavés | Loan | | |

=== Real Sociedad ===
==== In ====
| Date | Player | From | Type | Fee | Ref |

==== Out ====
| Date | Player | To | Type | Fee | Ref. |

=== Sevilla ===
==== In ====
| Date | Player | From | Type | Fee | Ref |
|---|---|---|---|---|---|
| 31 December 2022 | (France) Loïc Badé | (France) Rennes | Loan | | |
| 11 January 2023 | (Spain) Antonio Zarzana | (Portugal) Famalicão | Loan return | | |
| 17 January 2023 | (Argentina) Lucas Ocampos | (Netherlands) Ajax | Loan return | | |
| 30 January 2023 | (Sweden) Ludwig Augustinsson | (England) Aston Villa | Loan return | | |
| 30 January 2023 | (Spain) Bryan Gil | (England) Tottenham Hotspur | Loan | | |
| 30 January 2023 | (Senegal) Pape Gueye | (France) Marseille | Loan | | |

==== Out ====
| Date | Player | To | Type | Fee | Ref |
|---|---|---|---|---|---|
| 21 December 2022 | (Spain) Isco | Released | | | |
| 2 January 2023 | (Denmark) Kasper Dolberg | (France) Nice | Loan return | | |
| 11 January 2023 | (Spain) José Ángel Carmona | Elche | Loan | | |
| 13 January 2023 | (Spain) Antonio Zarzana | Numancia | Loan | | |
| 17 January 2023 | (Spain) Pedro Ortiz | (Portugal) Vizela | Loan | | |
| 30 January 2023 | (Sweden) Ludwig Augustinsson | Mallorca | Loan | | |
| 30 January 2023 | (Denmark) Thomas Delaney | (Germany) 1899 Hoffenheim | Loan | | |
| 31 January 2023 | (Spain) Kike Salas | Tenerife | Loan | | |
| 3 February 2023 | (Belgium) Adnan Januzaj | (Turkey) İstanbul Başakşehir | Loan | | |

=== Valencia ===
==== In ====
| Date | Player | From | Type | Fee | Ref |

==== Out ====
| Date | Player | To | Type | Fee | Ref |

=== Valladolid ===
==== In ====
| Date | Player | From | Type | Fee | Ref |
|---|---|---|---|---|---|
| 19 January 2023 | (Venezuela) Darwin Machís | (Mexico) Juárez | Transfer | Undisclosed | |
| 24 January 2023 | (Canada) Cyle Larin | (Belgium) Club Brugge | Loan | | |
| 31 January 2023 | (Morocco) Selim Amallah | (Belgium) Standard Liège | Transfer | Undisclosed | |
| 31 January 2023 | (Cameroon) Martin Hongla | (Italy) Hellas Verona | Loan | | |

==== Out ====
| Date | Player | To | Type | Fee | Ref |
|---|---|---|---|---|---|
| 30 January 2023 | (Colombia) Juanjo Narváez | Leganés | Loan | | |
| 31 January 2023 | (Spain) Sergi Guardiola | Cádiz | Loan | | |
| 31 January 2023 | (Morocco) Zouhair Feddal | Released | | | |
| 31 January 2023 | (Israel) Shon Weissman | Granada | Loan | | |

=== Villarreal ===
==== In ====
| Date | Player | From | Type | Fee | Ref |

==== Out ====
| Date | Player | To | Type | Fee | Ref |
|---|---|---|---|---|---|
| 6 January 2023 | (Argentina) Gerónimo Rulli | (Netherlands) Ajax | Transfer | Undisclosed | |
| 25 January 2023 | (Netherlands) Arnaut Danjuma | (England) Tottenham Hotspur | Loan | | |
| 31 January 2023 | (Spain) Manu Morlanes | Mallorca | Loan | | |

== Segunda División ==
=== Alavés ===
==== In ====
| Date | Player | From | Type | Fee | Ref |
|---|---|---|---|---|---|
| 10 January 2023 | (Chile) Sebastián Pino | Pontifical Catholic University of Chile | Transfer | Undisclosed | |
| 12 January 2023 | (Spain) Antonio Blanco | Real Madrid | Loan | | |
| 13 January 2023 | (Argentina) Joaquín Panichelli | (Argentina) River Plate | Transfer | Undisclosed | |
| 30 January 2023 | (Spain) Asier Villalibre | Athletic Bilbao | Loan | | |

==== Out ====
| Date | Player | To | Type | Fee | Ref |
|---|---|---|---|---|---|
| 4 January 2023 | (Mauritania) Abdallahi Mahmoud | (Croatia) Istra 1961 | Loan | | |
| 23 January 2023 | (Japan) Taichi Hara | (Belgium) Sint-Truiden | Loan | | |

=== Albacete ===
==== In ====
| Date | Player | From | Type | Fee | Ref |
|---|---|---|---|---|---|
| 11 January 2023 | (Bolivia) Jovanny Bolívar | (Venezuela) Deportivo La Guaira | Transfer | Undisclosed | |
| 17 January 2023 | (Spain) Carlos Isaac | (Portugal) Vizela | Transfer | Undisclosed | |
| 27 January 2023 | (Spain) Rodri | Villarreal B | Loan | | |
| 30 January 2023 | (Spain) Dani Escriche | Huesca | Loan | | |

==== Out ====
| Date | Player | To | Type | Fee | Ref |
|---|---|---|---|---|---|
| 19 December 2022 | (Spain) Rubén Martínez | (Greece) Lamia | Transfer | Undisclosed | |
| 30 January 2023 | (Ghana) Emmanuel Attipoe | Logroñés | Loan | | |
| 31 January 2023 | (Spain) Javi Jiménez | Released | | | |
| 31 January 2023 | (Belgium) Andy Kawaya | Released | | | |
| 31 January 2023 | (Spain) Javi Martínez | Osasuna | Loan return | | |
| 2 February 2023 | (Portugal) Tomás Reymão | Released | | | |

=== Andorra ===
==== In ====
| Date | Player | From | Type | Fee | Ref |
|---|---|---|---|---|---|
| 31 January 2023 | (Spain) Àlex Valle | Barcelona | Loan | | |
| 31 January 2023 | (Greece) Christos Albanis | (Greece) AEK Athens | Transfer | | |

==== Out ====
| Date | Player | To | Type | Fee | Ref |
|---|---|---|---|---|---|
| 29 December 2022 | (Spain) Marc Fernández | Gimnàstic Tarragona | Transfer | Undisclosed | |
| 20 January 2023 | (Spain) Pau Casadesús | Espanyol B | Loan | | |
| 31 January 2023 | (Andorra) Albert Rosas | Betis B | Loan | | |
| 1 February 2023 | (Spain) Moha Moukhliss | Barcelona B | Loan | | |

=== Burgos ===
==== In ====
| Date | Player | From | Type | Fee | Ref |
|---|---|---|---|---|---|
| 5 January 2023 | (Spain) Iván Serrano | Linares | Loan return | | |
| 26 January 2023 | (Spain) David Goldar | Ibiza | Transfer | Free | |
| 30 January 2023 | (Spain) Sergio Castel | Ibiza | Transfer | Free | |

==== Out ====
| Date | Player | To | Type | Fee | Ref |
|---|---|---|---|---|---|
| 5 January 2023 | (Spain) Iván Serrano | Released | | | |
| 9 January 2023 | (Spain) Saúl Berjón | Released | | | |

=== Cartagena ===
==== In ====
| Date | Player | From | Type | Fee | Ref |
|---|---|---|---|---|---|
| 5 January 2023 | (Spain) Miguelón | Espanyol | Loan | | |
| 16 January 2023 | (Spain) Oscar Ureña | Girona | Loan | | |
| 19 January 2023 | (Spain) Iván Martos | Almería | Loan | | |
| 19 January 2023 | (Spain) Darío Poveda | Getafe | Loan | | |
| 21 January 2023 | (Portugal) Pêpê | (Greece) Olympiacos | Loan | | |
| 29 January 2023 | (Cameroon) Yan Eteki | (Portugal) Casa Pia | Loan | | |

==== Out ====
| Date | Player | To | Type | Fee | Ref |
|---|---|---|---|---|---|
| 24 December 2022 | (Spain) Julián Delmás | Málaga | Transfer | Free | |
| 30 December 2022 | (Spain) Sergio Tejera | Released | | | |
| 28 January 2023 | (Spain) Neskes | Unionistas de Salamanca | Loan | | |

=== Eibar ===
==== In ====
| Date | Player | From | Type | Fee | Ref |
|---|---|---|---|---|---|
| 5 January 2023 | (Spain) Juan Carlos Arana | Villarreal B | Transfer | Undisclosed | |

==== Out ====
| Date | Player | To | Type | Fee | Ref |

=== Granada ===
==== In ====
| Date | Player | From | Type | Fee | Ref |
|---|---|---|---|---|---|
| 13 January 2023 | (Spain) Antoñín | (Portugal) Vitória de Guimarães | Loan return | | |
| 24 January 2023 | (Senegal) Famara Diédhiou | (Turkey) Alanyaspor | Loan | | |
| 30 January 2023 | (Spain) Pol Lozano | Espanyol | Loan | | |
| 31 January 2023 | (Israel) Shon Weissman | Valladolid | Loan | | |

==== Out ====
| Date | Player | To | Type | Fee | Ref |
|---|---|---|---|---|---|
| 13 January 2023 | (Spain) Antoñín | (Cyprus) Anorthosis Famagusta | Loan | | |
| 20 January 2023 | (Uruguay) Matías Arezo | (Uruguay) Peñarol | Loan | | |
| 27 January 2023 | (Spain) Pepe Sánchez | Deportivo La Coruña | Loan | | |
| 2 February 2023 | (Peru) Luis Abram | (United States) Atlanta United | Transfer | Undisclosed | |

=== Huesca ===
==== In ====
| Date | Player | From | Type | Fee | Ref |
|---|---|---|---|---|---|
| 20 January 2023 | (Spain) Juan Pérez | Osasuna | Transfer | Undisclosed | |
| 31 January 2023 | (Spain) Javi Martínez | Osasuna | Loan | | |
| 31 January 2023 | (Ghana) Samuel Obeng | Oviedo | Loan | | |

==== Out ====
| Date | Player | To | Type | Fee | Ref |
|---|---|---|---|---|---|
| 21 December 2022 | (Paraguay) Isidro Pitta | (Brazil) Cuiabá | Transfer | Undisclosed | |
| 4 January 2023 | (Spain) Eusebio Monzó | SS Reyes | Loan | | |
| 12 January 2023 | (Spain) Kevin Carlos | Betis Deportivo | Loan | | |
| 20 January 2023 | (Spain) Miguel San Román | Ponferradina | Transfer | Undisclosed | |
| 30 January 2023 | (Spain) Dani Escriche | Albacete | Loan | | |
| 31 January 2023 | (Spain) Juan Villar | Córdoba | Loan | | |

=== Ibiza ===
==== In ====
| Date | Player | From | Type | Fee | Ref |
|---|---|---|---|---|---|
| 29 December 2022 | (Argentina) Marcos Mauro | (Mexico) Juárez | Transfer | Undisclosed | |
| 2 January 2023 | (Spain) Joseda Menargues | Valencia B | Transfer | Undisclosed | |
| 4 January 2023 | (Argentina) Fausto Grillo | (Chile) O'Higgins | Transfer | Undisclosed | |
| 4 January 2023 | (Spain) Kaxe | Atlético Baleares | Transfer | Undisclosed | |
| 15 January 2023 | (Czech Republic) Lukáš Juliš | (Czech Republic) Sparta Prague | Transfer | Undisclosed | |
| 31 January 2023 | (Chile) Williams Alarcón | (Chile) Unión La Calera | Loan | | |
| 31 January 2023 | (Spain) Javi Serrano | Atlético Madrid | Loan | | |

==== Out ====
| Date | Player | To | Type | Fee | Ref |
|---|---|---|---|---|---|
| 19 January 2023 | (Spain) Darío Poveda | Getafe | Loan return | | |
| 26 January 2023 | (Spain) David Goldar | Burgos | Transfer | Free | |
| 30 January 2023 | (Spain) Sergio Castel | Burgos | Transfer | Free | |

=== Las Palmas ===
==== In ====
| Date | Player | From | Type | Fee | Ref |
|---|---|---|---|---|---|
| 13 January 2023 | (Cameroon) Wilfrid Kaptoum | (United States) New England Revolution | Transfer | Undisclosed | |
| 31 January 2023 | (Spain) Loren | Real Betis | Loan | | |

==== Out ====
| Date | Player | To | Type | Fee | Ref |

=== Leganés ===
==== In ====
| Date | Player | From | Type | Fee | Ref |
|---|---|---|---|---|---|
| 19 January 2023 | (Spain) Enric Franquesa | Levante | Loan | | |
| 30 January 2023 | (Colombia) Juanjo Narváez | Valladolid | Loan | | |

==== Out ====
| Date | Player | To | Type | Fee | Ref |
|---|---|---|---|---|---|
| 25 January 2023 | (Spain) Javier Avilés | Lugo | Loan | | |
| 30 January 2023 | (Denmark) Riza Durmisi | (Italy) Lazio | Loan return | | |
| 31 January 2023 | (Spain) Naim García | Ponferradina | Loan | | |

=== Levante ===
==== In ====
| Date | Player | From | Type | Fee | Ref |

==== Out ====
| Date | Player | To | Type | Fee | Ref |
|---|---|---|---|---|---|
| 19 January 2023 | (Spain) Enric Franquesa | Leganés | Loan | | |

=== Lugo ===
==== In ====
| Date | Player | From | Type | Fee | Ref |
|---|---|---|---|---|---|
| 2 January 2023 | (Spain) Joselu | Free Agent | | | |
| 2 January 2023 | (Serbia) Aleksandar Pantić | Free Agent | | | |
| 25 January 2023 | (Spain) Javier Avilés | Leganés | Loan | | |
| 1 February 2023 | (Spain) Andoni López | Tenerife | Transfer | Undisclosed | |
| 3 February 2023 | (Portugal) Gui Guedes | Almería | Loan | | |
| 6 February 2023 | (Serbia) Marko Šćepović | Free Agent | | | |

==== Out ====
| Date | Player | To | Type | Fee | Ref |
|---|---|---|---|---|---|
| 21 January 2023 | (Ukraine) Orest Lebedenko | Deportivo La Coruña | Transfer | Undisclosed | |
| 30 January 2023 | (Colombia) Neyder Lozano | Talavera | Loan | | |
| 1 February 2023 | (Spain) Chris Ramos | Cádiz | Transfer | Undisclosed | |

=== Málaga ===
==== In ====
| Date | Player | From | Type | Fee | Ref |
|---|---|---|---|---|---|
| 24 December 2022 | (Spain) Julián Delmás | Cartagena | Transfer | Free | |
| 9 January 2023 | (England) Arvin Appiah | Almería | Loan | | |
| 11 January 2023 | (Ivory Coast) Lago Junior | Free Agent | | | |

==== Out ====
| Date | Player | To | Type | Fee | Ref |
|---|---|---|---|---|---|
| 28 December 2022 | (Spain) Pablo Hervías | (Bolivia) Club Bolívar | Transfer | Undisclosed | |
| 9 January 2023 | (Spain) Juanfran | Released | | | |
| 19 January 2023 | (Spain) Dani Lorenzo | Mérida | Loan | | |

=== Mirandés ===
==== In ====
| Date | Player | From | Type | Fee | Ref |
|---|---|---|---|---|---|
| 18 January 2023 | (Spain) Javier Llabrés | Mallorca | Loan | | |
| 20 January 2023 | (Spain) Álvaro Sanz | Barcelona | Transfer | Free | |
| 23 January 2023 | (Spain) David Vicente | Unionistas de Salamanca | Transfer | Undisclosed | |
| 3 February 2023 | (Slovenia) Žiga Frelih | Free Agent | | | |

==== Out ====
| Date | Player | To | Type | Fee | Ref |
|---|---|---|---|---|---|
| 26 December 2022 | (Spain) Raúl Parra | Cádiz | Loan return | | |
| 28 December 2022 | (Portugal) Marcos Paulo | Atlético Madrid | Loan return | | |
| 24 January 2023 | (Slovakia) Samuel Mráz | (Italy) Spezia | Loan return | | |
| 31 January 2023 | (Spain) Javi Serrano | Atlético Madrid | Loan return | | |

=== Oviedo ===
==== In ====
| Date | Player | From | Type | Fee | Ref |
|---|---|---|---|---|---|
| 3 January 2023 | (Argentina) Leonardo Sequeira | (Argentina) Belgrano | Transfer | Undisclosed | |
| 9 January 2023 | (Spain) Juanfran | Free Agent | | | |
| 25 January 2023 | (Spain) Raúl Moro | (Italy) Lazio | Loan | | |
| 27 January 2023 | (Spain) Manu Vallejo | Girona | Loan | | |
| 1 February 2023 | (Spain) Víctor Camarasa | Free Agent | | | |

==== Out ====
| Date | Player | To | Type | Fee | Ref |
|---|---|---|---|---|---|
| 3 January 2023 | (Mexico) Daniel Alonso Aceves | (Mexico) Pachuca | Loan return | | |
| 5 January 2023 | (Spain) Miguelón | Espanyol | Loan return | | |
| 24 January 2023 | (Spain) Marco Sangalli | Released | | | |
| 31 January 2023 | (Ghana) Samuel Obeng | Huesca | Loan | | |

=== Ponferradina ===
==== In ====
| Date | Player | From | Type | Fee | Ref |
|---|---|---|---|---|---|
| 14 November 2022 | (Spain) Álex Díez | Free Agent | | | |
| 18 January 2023 | (Morocco) Sofian Chakla | (Belgium) OH Leuven | Transfer | Free | |
| 20 January 2023 | (Spain) Miguel San Román | Huesca | Transfer | Undisclosed | |
| 31 January 2023 | (Spain) Naim García | Leganés | Loan | | |

==== Out ====
| Date | Player | To | Type | Fee | Ref |
|---|---|---|---|---|---|
| 9 January 2023 | (Georgia (country)) Georgi Makaridze | Released | | | |
| 9 January 2023 | (Spain) Ricard Pujol | Released | | | |
| 31 January 2023 | (Portugal) Aldair Neves | (Portugal) Sanjoanense | Loan | | |

=== Racing Santander ===
==== In ====
| Date | Player | From | Type | Fee | Ref |
|---|---|---|---|---|---|
| 24 January 2023 | (Spain) Marco Sangalli | Free Agent | | | |
| 31 January 2023 | (Croatia) Roko Baturina | (Hungary) Ferencváros | Loan | | |

==== Out ====
| Date | Player | To | Type | Fee | Ref |
|---|---|---|---|---|---|
| 30 January 2023 | (Spain) Alfon | Celta Vigo | Loan return | | |
| 31 January 2023 | (Spain) Marco Camus | Córdoba | Loan | | |

=== Sporting Gijón ===
==== In ====
| Date | Player | From | Type | Fee | Ref |
|---|---|---|---|---|---|
| 9 January 2023 | (Chile) Ignacio Jeraldino | (Mexico) Santos Laguna | Loan | | |
| 27 January 2023 | (Uruguay) Guillermo de Amores | (Argentina) Lanús | Loan | | |
| 31 January 2023 | (Spain) José Marsà | (Portugal) Sporting CP | Loan | | |

==== Out ====
| Date | Player | To | Type | Fee | Ref |
|---|---|---|---|---|---|
| 25 January 2023 | (Spain) Diego Mariño | Almería | Transfer | Undisclosed | |

=== Tenerife ===
==== In ====
| Date | Player | From | Type | Fee | Ref |
|---|---|---|---|---|---|
| 30 January 2023 | (Denmark) Riza Durmisi | (Italy) Lazio | Loan | | |
| 31 January 2023 | (Spain) Kike Salas | Sevilla | Loan | | |

==== Out ====
| Date | Player | To | Type | Fee | Ref |
|---|---|---|---|---|---|
| 30 December 2022 | (England) Arvin Appiah | Almería | Loan return | | |
| 1 February 2023 | (Spain) Andoni López | Lugo | Transfer | Undisclosed | |

=== Villarreal B ===
==== In ====
| Date | Player | From | Type | Fee | Ref |
|---|---|---|---|---|---|
| 7 January 2023 | (Spain) Álex Millán | (Portugal) Famalicão | Loan return | | |
| 18 January 2023 | (Spain) Ramon Terrats | Girona | Loan | | |

==== Out ====
| Date | Player | To | Type | Fee | Ref |
|---|---|---|---|---|---|
| 5 January 2023 | (Spain) Juan Carlos Arana | Eibar | Transfer | Undisclosed | |
| 27 January 2023 | (Spain) Rodri | Albacete | Loan | | |

=== Zaragoza ===
==== In ====
| Date | Player | From | Type | Fee | Ref |
|---|---|---|---|---|---|
| 27 December 2022 | (Chile) Tomás Alarcón | Cádiz | Loan | | |
| 31 January 2023 | (Cape Verde) Bebé | Rayo Vallecano | Loan | | |

==== Out ====
| Date | Player | To | Type | Fee | Ref |
|---|---|---|---|---|---|
| 4 January 2023 | (Spain) Daniel Lasure | Released | | | |
| 31 January 2023 | (Serbia) Radosav Petrović | Released | | | |
