= List of Spanish football transfers winter 2023–24 =

This is a list of Spanish football transfers for the 2023–24 winter transfer window. Only transfers featuring La Liga and Segunda División are listed.

== La Liga ==
Note: Flags indicate national team as has been defined under FIFA eligibility rules. Players may hold more than one non-FIFA nationality.

=== Barcelona ===
In:

No.	Pos.	Nation	Player
19	FW	BRA	Vitor Roque (from (Brazil) Athletico Paranaense)

Out:

No.	Pos.	Nation	Player

=== Real Madrid ===
In:

No.	Pos.	Nation	Player

Out:

No.	Pos.	Nation	Player

=== Atlético Madrid ===
In:

No.	Pos.	Nation	Player
1	GK	ROU	Horațiu Moldovan (from (Romania) Rapid București)
4	DF	BRA	Gabriel Paulista (from Valencia)
18	MF	BEL	Arthur Vermeeren (from (Belgium) Royal Antwerp)

Out:

No.	Pos.	Nation	Player
1	GK	CRO	Ivo Grbić (to (England) Sheffield United)
4	DF	TUR	Çağlar Söyüncü (on loan to (Turkey) Fenerbahçe)
17	DF	ESP	Javi Galán (on loan to Real Sociedad)

=== Real Sociedad ===
In:

No.	Pos.	Nation	Player
11	FW	SUR	Sheraldo Becker (from (Germany) Union Berlin)
25	DF	ESP	Javi Galán (on loan from Atlético Madrid)

Out:

No.	Pos.	Nation	Player
11	FW	FRA	Mohamed-Ali Cho (to (France) Nice)
—	FW	ESP	Jon Karrikaburu (on loan to Andorra, previously on loan at Alavés)

=== Villarreal ===
In:

No.	Pos.	Nation	Player
2	DF	COL	Yerson Mosquera (on loan from (England) Wolverhampton Wanderers, previously on loan at (United States) FC Cincinnati)
9	FW	POR	Gonçalo Guedes (on loan from (England) Wolverhampton Wanderers, previously on loan at (Portugal) Benfica)
12	DF	CIV	Eric Bailly (from (Turkey) Beşiktaş)
25	FW	BFA	Bertrand Traoré (from (England) Aston Villa)

Out:

No.	Pos.	Nation	Player
2	DF	ITA	Matteo Gabbia (loan return to (Italy) AC Milan)
9	FW	CHI	Ben Brereton Díaz (on loan to (England) Sheffield United)

=== Real Betis ===
In:

No.	Pos.	Nation	Player
4	MF	USA	Johnny Cardoso (from (Brazil) Internacional)
9	FW	ARG	Chimy Ávila (from Osasuna)
11	FW	COD	Cédric Bakambu (from (Turkey) Galatasaray)
18	MF	ESP	Pablo Fornals (from (England) West Ham United)

Out:

No.	Pos.	Nation	Player
9	FW	ESP	Borja Iglesias (on loan to (Germany) Bayer Leverkusen)
11	FW	BRA	Luiz Henrique (to (Brazil) Botafogo)
16	FW	ESP	Juan Cruz (on loan to Leganés)
18	MF	MEX	Andrés Guardado (to (Mexico) León)
—	FW	ESP	Juanmi (on loan to Cádiz, previously on loan at (Saudi Arabia) Al-Riyadh)

=== Osasuna ===
In:

No.	Pos.	Nation	Player

Out:

No.	Pos.	Nation	Player
2	DF	ESP	Nacho Vidal (on loan to Mallorca)
8	MF	SRB	Darko Brašanac (to Leganés)
9	FW	ARG	Chimy Ávila (to Real Betis)
—	DF	ESP	Diego Moreno (on loan to Cartagena, previously on loan at Mirandés)

=== Athletic Bilbao ===
In:

No.	Pos.	Nation	Player

Out:

No.	Pos.	Nation	Player
23	MF	ESP	Peru Nolaskoain (to Eibar)
—	FW	ESP	Nico Serrano (on loan to Racing Ferrol, previously on loan at (Netherlands) PEC Zwolle)

=== Mallorca ===
In:

No.	Pos.	Nation	Player
22	DF	ESP	Nacho Vidal (on loan from Osasuna)
23	FW	SRB	Nemanja Radonjić (on loan from (Italy) Torino)

Out:

No.	Pos.	Nation	Player
23	FW	SEN	Amath Ndiaye (on loan to Valladolid)
27	DF	ESP	David López (on loan to Elche)
—	DF	ARG	Braian Cufré (free agent, previously on loan at (United States) New York City)

=== Girona ===
In:

No.	Pos.	Nation	Player

Out:

No.	Pos.	Nation	Player
2	DF	COL	Bernardo Espinosa (to (Colombia) Atlético Nacional)
6	MF	MLI	Ibrahima Kébé (on loan to Mirandés)
—	FW	ESP	Arnau Ortiz (on loan to Cartagena, previously on loan at Eldense)

=== Rayo Vallecano ===
In:

No.	Pos.	Nation	Player
15	MF	POR	Miguel Crespo (on loan from (Turkey) Fenerbahçe)

Out:

No.	Pos.	Nation	Player
—	MF	ESP	Joni Montiel (on loan to Burgos, previously on loan at Valladolid)

=== Sevilla ===
In:

No.	Pos.	Nation	Player
10	FW	ARG	Alejo Véliz (on loan from (England) Tottenham Hotspur)
42	MF	FRA	Lucien Agoumé (on loan from (Italy) Inter Milan)
46	MF	TUN	Hannibal Mejbri (on loan from (England) Manchester United)

Out:

No.	Pos.	Nation	Player
2	DF	ARG	Federico Gattoni (on loan to (Belgium) Anderlecht)
10	MF	CRO	Ivan Rakitić (to (Saudi Arabia) Al Shabab)
20	MF	BRA	Fernando (to (Brazil) Vila Nova)
—	GK	ESP	Alfonso Pastor (to Atlético Levante)

=== Celta Vigo ===
In:

No.	Pos.	Nation	Player
9	FW	ARG	Tadeo Allende (from (Argentina) Godoy Cruz)
16	MF	BRA	Jailson (from (Brazil) Palmeiras)
22	DF	ESP	Javier Manquillo (from (England) Newcastle United)

Out:

No.	Pos.	Nation	Player
1	GK	ARG	Agustín Marchesín (to (Brazil) Grêmio)
—	FW	URU	Lautaro de León (on loan to Mirandés, previously on loan at Cartagena)

=== Cádiz ===
In:

No.	Pos.	Nation	Player
6	MF	MLI	Diadie Samassékou (on loan from (Germany) TSG Hoffenheim)
9	FW	ESP	Juanmi (on loan from Real Betis, previously on loan at (Saudi Arabia) Al-Riyadh)
24	DF	SYR	Aiham Ousou (on loan from (Czech Republic) Slavia Prague, previously on loan at (Sweden) Häcken)

Out:

No.	Pos.	Nation	Player
9	FW	ESP	Álvaro Negredo (to Valladolid)
—	MF	ESP	Martín Calderón (on loan to Atlético Sanluqueño)
—	FW	ESP	Álvaro Jiménez (on loan to Tenerife, previously on loan at (Iran) Tractor)

=== Getafe ===
In:

No.	Pos.	Nation	Player
24	MF	GUI	Ilaix Moriba (on loan from (Germany) RB Leipzig)
25	MF	ESP	Yellu Santiago (from Valencia B)

Out:

No.	Pos.	Nation	Player
10	FW	TUR	Enes Ünal (on loan to (England) Bournemouth)
17	FW	HON	Choco Lozano (on loan to Almería)
22	DF	URU	Damián Suárez (to (Brazil) Botafogo)
23	DF	SRB	Stefan Mitrović (to (Belgium) Gent)
—	MF	GHA	Sabit Abdulai (on loan to Real Murcia, previously on loan at Lugo)
—	FW	ESP	Darío Poveda (on loan to Cartagena, previously on loan at Leganés)

=== Valencia ===
In:

No.	Pos.	Nation	Player
11	FW	DOM	Peter Federico (on loan from Real Madrid B)

Out:

No.	Pos.	Nation	Player
5	DF	BRA	Gabriel Paulista (to Atlético Madrid)
—	MF	FRA	Koba Koindredi (to (Portugal) Estoril, previously on loan)

=== Almería ===
In:

No.	Pos.	Nation	Player
15	FW	HON	Choco Lozano (on loan from Getafe)
8	MF	ESP	Jonathan Viera (from Las Palmas)
16	DF	SRB	Aleksandar Radovanović (from (Belgium) Kortrijk)
24	DF	MOZ	Bruno Langa (on loan from (Portugal) Chaves)
38	MF	ARG	Luka Romero (on loan from (Italy) AC Milan)

Out:

No.	Pos.	Nation	Player
2	DF	BRA	Kaiky (on loan to Albacete)
8	MF	ESP	Arnau Puigmal (on loan to Elche)
14	MF	BRA	Lázaro (on loan to (Brazil) Palmeiras)
15	DF	ESP	Sergio Akieme (to (France) Reims)
24	DF	GNB	Houboulang Mendes (on loan to Mirandés)
34	FW	GNB	Marciano Sanca (on loan to Alcorcón)

=== Granada ===
In:

No.	Pos.	Nation	Player
2	DF	URU	Bruno Méndez (from (Brazil) Corinthians)
3	DF	FRA	Faitout Maouassa (on loan from (Belgium) Club Brugge, previously on loan at (France) Lens)
6	MF	CMR	Martin Hongla (from (Italy) Hellas Verona)
13	GK	ESP	Marc Martínez (from Cartagena)
17	FW	CAN	Theo Corbeanu (from (England) Wolverhampton Wanderers, previously on loan at (Switzerland) Grasshoppers)
18	FW	POL	Kamil Jóźwiak (from (United States) Charlotte)
19	FW	URU	Facundo Pellistri (on loan from (England) Manchester United)
22	DF	POL	Kamil Piątkowski (on loan from (Austria) Red Bull Salzburg)
25	GK	ARG	Augusto Batalla (on loan from (Argentina) River Plate, previously on loan at (Argentina) San Lorenzo)

Out:

No.	Pos.	Nation	Player
3	DF	POR	Wilson Manafá (to (China) Shanghai Shenhua)
13	GK	POR	André Ferreira (on loan to Valladolid)
17	FW	ISR	Shon Weissman (on loan to (Italy) Salernitana)
18	MF	SRB	Njegoš Petrović (on loan to (Serbia) Vojvodina)
19	FW	SEN	Famara Diédhiou (on loan to (Wales) Cardiff City)
22	MF	ESP	Alberto Perea (to (Cyprus) Anorthosis Famagusta)
26	FW	ESP	Bryan Zaragoza (on loan to (Germany) Bayern Munich)
33	DF	ESP	Álvaro Carreras (loan return to (England) Manchester United)

=== Las Palmas ===
In:

No.	Pos.	Nation	Player
21	MF	ESP	José Campaña (free agent)

Out:

No.	Pos.	Nation	Player
21	MF	ESP	Jonathan Viera (to Almería)

=== Alavés ===
In:

No.	Pos.	Nation	Player
22	FW	ESP	Carlos Vicente (from Racing Ferrol)

Out:

No.	Pos.	Nation	Player
9	FW	ESP	Jon Karrikaburu (loan return to Real Sociedad)
19	DF	SRB	Nikola Maraš (on loan to Levante)
—	FW	ESP	Alan Godoy (on loan to Gimnàstic, previously on loan at Mirandés)

== Ligue 2 ==
Note: Flags indicate national team as has been defined under FIFA eligibility rules. Players may hold more than one non-FIFA nationality.

=== Valladolid ===
In:

No.	Pos.	Nation	Player
12	DF	BRA	Lucas Oliveira (on loan from (Brazil) Cruzeiro)
13	GK	POR	André Ferreira (on loan from Granada)
17	MF	CRO	Stipe Biuk (on loan from (United States) Los Angeles)
19	FW	SEN	Amath Ndiaye (on loan from Mallorca)
21	FW	ESP	Álvaro Negredo (from Cádiz)
34	DF	ESP	César Tárrega (on loan from Valencia B)

Out:

No.	Pos.	Nation	Player
15	DF	BRA	Gustavo Henrique (to (Brazil) Corinthians)
21	MF	ESP	Joni Montiel (loan return to Rayo Vallecano)
25	GK	BRA	John (loan return to (Brazil) Santos)
36	FW	NGA	Tunde Akinsola (on loan to (Portugal) AVS)

=== Espanyol ===
In:

No.	Pos.	Nation	Player

Out:

No.	Pos.	Nation	Player
12	DF	BRA	Ramon Ramos (loan return to (Greece) Olympiacos, later on loan to (Brazil) Cuiabá)

=== Elche ===
In:

No.	Pos.	Nation	Player
3	MF	ECU	Jhegson Méndez (on loan from (Brazil) São Paulo)
8	MF	ESP	Arnau Puigmal (on loan from Almería)
9	MF	ESP	Sergio Bermejo (on loan from Zaragoza)
10	FW	ESP	Manu Nieto (on loan from Andorra)
13	GK	ARG	Matías Dituro (from (Turkey) Fatih Karagümrük)
35	DF	ESP	David López (on loan from Mallorca)

Out:

No.	Pos.	Nation	Player
3	DF	ARG	Lautaro Blanco (to (Argentina) Boca Juniors)
8	MF	ESP	Raúl Guti (on loan to Zaragoza)
9	FW	ESP	Sergio León (to Eibar)
13	GK	ESP	Edgar Badia (on loan to Zaragoza)
15	DF	ESP	Álex Martín (on loan to Racing Ferrol)
16	FW	ESP	Fidel (to Albacete)

=== Levante ===
In:

No.	Pos.	Nation	Player
14	DF	SRB	Nikola Maraš (on loan from Alavés)

Out:

No.	Pos.	Nation	Player
14	DF	POR	Rúben Vezo (to (Greece) Olympiacos)

=== Eibar ===
In:

No.	Pos.	Nation	Player
11	FW	ESP	Sergio León (from Elche)
24	MF	ESP	Peru Nolaskoain (from Athletic Bilbao)

Out:

No.	Pos.	Nation	Player
11	MF	FRA	Yanis Rahmani (on loan to Tenerife)
12	MF	VEN	Jorge Yriarte (on loan to Amorebieta)
29	MF	ESP	Ángel Troncho (on loan to Amorebieta)

=== Albacete ===
In:

No.	Pos.	Nation	Player
6	MF	ESP	Rai Marchán (from (Australia) Melbourne Victory)
11	FW	ESP	Fidel (from Elche)
15	DF	BRA	Kaiky (on loan from Almería)
25	GK	CZE	Tomáš Vaclík (free agent)

Out:

No.	Pos.	Nation	Player

=== Andorra ===
In:

No.	Pos.	Nation	Player
9	FW	ESP	Jon Karrikaburu (on loan from Real Sociedad, previously on loan at Alavés)
22	MF	ESP	Jorge Pombo (from Racing Santander)

Out:

No.	Pos.	Nation	Player
9	FW	ESP	Manu Nieto (on loan to Elche)
12	FW	ALB	Laorent Shabani (loan return to (Sweden) Norrköping)
22	DF	COL	Anderson Arroyo (loan return to (England) Liverpool)

=== Real Oviedo ===
In:

No.	Pos.	Nation	Player
13	MF	URU	Santiago Homenchenko (on loan from (Uruguay) Peñarol)
22	MF	BEL	Jonathan Dubasin (on loan from (Switzerland) Basel)
25	FW	ESP	Borja Sánchez (from (Mexico) León)

Out:

No.	Pos.	Nation	Player
22	FW	ECU	Romario Ibarra (loan return to (Mexico) Pachuca)
32	MF	ESP	Álex Cardero (on loan to Arenteiro)

=== Cartagena ===
In:

No.	Pos.	Nation	Player
1	GK	ESP	Tomás Mejías (from Ceuta)
2	DF	ESP	Diego Moreno (on loan from Osasuna, previously on loan at Mirandés)
6	MF	ESP	Andy Rodríguez (from Burgos)
10	FW	ESP	Darío Poveda (on loan from Getafe, previously on loan at Leganés)
26	FW	ESP	Arnau Ortiz (on loan from Girona, previously on loan at Eldense)

Out:

No.	Pos.	Nation	Player
1	GK	ESP	Marc Martínez (to Granada)
7	MF	ESP	David Ferreiro (to Málaga)
10	MF	NED	Hector Hevel (to (China) Guangxi Pingguo Haliao)
19	FW	POR	Umaro Embaló (loan return to (Netherlands) Fortuna Sittard)
21	FW	SWE	Isak Jansson (on loan to (Austria) Rapid Wien)
24	MF	ESP	Jony (free agent)
29	FW	URU	Lautaro de León (loan return to Celta Vigo)

=== Tenerife ===
In:

No.	Pos.	Nation	Player
11	MF	FRA	Yanis Rahmani (on loan from Eibar)
20	FW	ESP	Álvaro Jiménez (on loan from Cádiz, previously on loan at (Iran) Tractor)

Out:

No.	Pos.	Nation	Player
7	FW	ESP	Elady (on loan to Huesca)
11	FW	GHA	Mo Dauda (on loan to Eldense)
20	MF	ESP	Pablo Hernández (on loan to Melilla)
28	FW	ESP	Alassan (on loan to Melilla)

=== Burgos ===
In:

No.	Pos.	Nation	Player
4	DF	COL	Anderson Arroyo (on loan from (England) Liverpool, previously on loan at Andorra)
21	MF	ESP	Joni Montiel (on loan from Rayo Vallecano, previously on loan at Valladolid)

Out:

No.	Pos.	Nation	Player
17	MF	ESP	Andy Rodríguez (to Cartagena)
27	FW	ESP	Javi López (on loan to Algeciras)

=== Racing Santander ===
In:

No.	Pos.	Nation	Player
8	MF	ESP	Jordi Mboula (from (Italy) Hellas Verona)
12	FW	CRO	Roko Baturina (on loan from (Portugal) Gil Vicente)
18	DF	ESP	Manu Hernando (from Amorebieta)

Out:

No.	Pos.	Nation	Player
8	MF	ESP	Jorge Pombo (to Andorra)
27	MF	ESP	Yeray Cabanzón (on loan to Ponferradina)

=== Zaragoza ===
In:

No.	Pos.	Nation	Player
2	DF	ALG	Akim Zedadka (on loan from (France) Lille)
10	MF	ESP	Raúl Guti (on loan from Elche)
25	GK	ESP	Edgar Badia (on loan from Elche)

Out:

No.	Pos.	Nation	Player
10	MF	ESP	Sergio Bermejo (on loan to Elche)
27	DF	ESP	Marcos Luna (on loan to Real Unión)
—	FW	ESP	Guillem Naranjo (on loan to Teruel, previously on loan at Sabadell)

=== Leganés ===
In:

No.	Pos.	Nation	Player
5	DF	ESP	Borja López (on loan from (Belgium) Zulte Waregem)
11	FW	ESP	Juan Cruz (on loan from Real Betis)
14	MF	SRB	Darko Brašanac (from Osasuna)

Out:

No.	Pos.	Nation	Player
5	DF	ESP	Josema (to (Poland) Ruch Chorzów)
11	FW	ESP	Darío Poveda (loan return to Getafe)
27	FW	ESP	Naim García (on loan to Barcelona B)
33	DF	ESP	Lalo Aguilar (on loan to Atlético Madrid B)
—	MF	BRA	William de Camargo (to Fuenlabrada)
—	MF	ESP	Sergio Navarro (on loan to Rayo Majadahonda, previously on loan at Real Murcia)
—	FW	ESP	Javier Avilés (on loan to Málaga, previously on loan at Amorebieta)

=== Huesca ===
In:

No.	Pos.	Nation	Player
2	DF	ESP	Carlos Gutiérrez (from (Japan) V-Varen Nagasaki)
21	FW	ESP	Elady (on loan from Tenerife)

Out:

No.	Pos.	Nation	Player
19	FW	GAM	Aboubakary Kanté (free agent)
27	FW	ESP	Manu Rico (on loan to Ceuta)
29	FW	ESP	Diego Aznar (on loan to Valencia B)
—	FW	ESP	Kevin Carlos (to (Switzerland) Yverdon-Sport, previously on loan)

=== Mirandés ===
In:

No.	Pos.	Nation	Player
6	MF	MLI	Ibrahima Kébé (on loan from Girona)
17	DF	GNB	Houboulang Mendes (on loan from Almería)
23	FW	ITA	Antonino La Gumina (on loan from (Italy) Sampdoria)
25	GK	ESP	Andoni Zubiaurre (on loan from Eldense)
29	FW	URU	Lautaro de León (on loan from Celta Vigo, previously on loan at Cartagena)
32	MF	COL	Daniel Luna (on loan from Mallorca B)

Out:

No.	Pos.	Nation	Player
14	FW	CRO	Ivan Durdov (loan return to (Belgium) Oostende)
17	MF	RUS	Nikita Iosifov (to Castellón)
21	DF	ESP	Diego Moreno (loan return to Osasuna)
29	FW	ESP	Alan Godoy (loan return to Alavés)
32	DF	ESP	Rubén Sánchez (loan return to Espanyol)

=== Sporting Gijón ===
In:

No.	Pos.	Nation	Player
20	FW	ESP	Mario González (on loan from (United States) Los Angeles)

Out:

No.	Pos.	Nation	Player
14	FW	CHI	Ignacio Jeraldino (to (Chile) Audax Italiano)
20	MF	MEX	Jordan Carrillo (loan return to (Mexico) Santos Laguna)
27	DF	ESP	Enol Coto (on loan to Real Murcia)

=== Villarreal B ===
In:

No.	Pos.	Nation	Player
17	FW	ESP	Hugo Novoa (on loan from (Germany) RB Leipzig, previously on loan at (Netherlands) Utrecht)

Out:

No.	Pos.	Nation	Player
17	FW	ESP	Fabio Blanco (on loan to Cultural Leonesa)
—	MF	ESP	Luis Quintero (on loan to Deportivo La Coruña, previously on loan at Amorebieta)

=== Amorebieta ===
In:

No.	Pos.	Nation	Player
5	DF	ESP	Unai Bustinza (free agent)
6	MF	VEN	Jorge Yriarte (on loan from Eibar)
23	FW	ESP	Iker Unzueta (on loan from (Portugal) Vizela)
29	MF	ESP	Ángel Troncho (on loan from Eibar)

Out:

No.	Pos.	Nation	Player
4	DF	ESP	Manu Hernando (to Racing Santander)
19	FW	ESP	Javier Avilés (loan return to Leganés)
27	MF	ESP	Luis Quintero (loan return to Villarreal B)
29	FW	ITA	Marco Da Graca (loan return to (Italy) Juventus)

=== Racing Ferrol ===
In:

No.	Pos.	Nation	Player
3	MF	ESP	Pinchi (on loan from (Turkey) Çaykur Rizespor)
12	DF	ESP	Álex Martín (on loan from Elche)
23	FW	ESP	Nico Serrano (on loan from Athletic Bilbao, previously on loan at (Netherlands) PEC Zwolle)

Out:

No.	Pos.	Nation	Player
23	FW	ESP	Carlos Vicente (to Alavés)

=== Alcorcón ===
In:

No.	Pos.	Nation	Player
14	MF	ESP	Fede Vico (from (Greece) Asteras Tripolis)
24	MF	ESP	Iker Bilbao (from (Greece) PAS Giannina)
33	FW	GNB	Marciano Sanca (on loan from Almería)

Out:

No.	Pos.	Nation	Player
7	FW	ESP	Álvaro Bustos (to Recreativo Huelva)
14	MF	ESP	Álex López (to (Greece) Kalamata)

=== Eldense ===
In:

No.	Pos.	Nation	Player
13	GK	ESP	Ian Mackay (from Deportivo La Coruña)
15	FW	GHA	Mo Dauda (on loan from Tenerife)
25	DF	ESP	Nacho Monsalve (from (Poland) ŁKS Łódź)

Out:

No.	Pos.	Nation	Player
13	GK	ESP	Andoni Zubiaurre (on loan to Mirandés)
15	MF	ESP	Miguel Marí (on loan to Hércules)
29	FW	ESP	Arnau Ortiz (loan return to Girona)
—	MF	ESP	Mario da Costa (on loan to Lugo, previously on loan at Atlético Madrid B)
—	DF	ESP	Xavi Estacio (to Recreativo Granada, previously on loan at San Fernando)

== See also ==
- 2023–24 La Liga
- 2023–24 Segunda División
