= 2021–22 SD Huesca season =

SD Huesca
2021–22 season
- Owner: Fundación Alcoraz
- President: Agustín Lasaosa
- Head coach: Ignacio Ambríz
- Stadium: El Alcoraz
- Segunda División: 13th
- Copa del Rey: Second round
- Top goalscorer: League: Jaime Seoane (14); All: Jaime Seoane (14)
Home colours	Away colours	Third colours

The 2021–22 season was the 62nd season in the existence of SD Huesca and the club's first season back in the top flight of Spanish football. In addition to the domestic league, SD Huesca participated in this season's edition of the Copa del Rey.

== Players ==
=== First-team squad ===
As of 5 April 2022.

Note: Flags indicate national team as defined under FIFA eligibility rules; some limited exceptions apply. Players may hold more than one non-FIFA nationality.

No.	Pos.	Nation	Player
1	GK	ESP	Andrés Fernández
2	DF	ROU	Andrei Rațiu
3	DF	FRA	Florian Miguel
4	DF	ESP	Pablo Insua
5	MF	ESP	Pedro Mosquera
6	MF	ESP	Cristian Salvador
7	MF	ESP	David Ferreiro (vice-captain)
9	MF	ESP	Gerard Valentín
10	FW	ESP	Dani Escriche
11	MF	ESP	Joaquín Muñoz
12	MF	ESP	David Timor
13	GK	ESP	Miguel San Román

No.	Pos.	Nation	Player
14	DF	ESP	Jorge Pulido (captain)
15	MF	CIV	Lago Junior (on loan from Mallorca)
16	MF	ESP	Pablo Martínez (on loan from Levante)
17	MF	ESP	Mikel Rico (3rd captain)
18	FW	ARG	Adolfo Gaich (on loan from CSKA Moscow)
19	FW	ESP	Darío Poveda (on loan from Getafe)
20	MF	ESP	Jaime Seoane
21	MF	ESP	Marc Mateu
22	MF	ESP	Juan Carlos Real
23	DF	ESP	Ignasi Miquel (on loan from Getafe)
24	MF	FRA	Enzo Lombardo

=== Reserve team ===
Note: Flags indicate national team as defined under FIFA eligibility rules; some limited exceptions apply. Players may hold more than one non-FIFA nationality.

No.	Pos.	Nation	Player
26	MF	ESP	Pablo Tomeo
27	MF	ESP	Alberto Fuentes
28	FW	ESP	Kevin Carlos
29	DF	ESP	Gerard Barri
30	GK	POR	Tiago Martins
31	MF	ESP	Manu Rico

No.	Pos.	Nation	Player
32	FW	ESP	Gustavo Abizanda
33	DF	ESP	Hugo Anglada
35	MF	ESP	Roberto Barba
36	DF	ESP	Eusebio Monzó
38	FW	ESP	Esteban Aparicio

=== Out on loan ===
Note: Flags indicate national team as defined under FIFA eligibility rules; some limited exceptions apply. Players may hold more than one non-FIFA nationality.

No.	Pos.	Nation	Player
—	GK	ESP	Álvaro Fernández (at Brentford until 30 June 2022)
—	DF	ARG	Julio Buffarini (at Cartagena until 30 June 2022)
—	FW	PAR	Isidro Pitta (at Juventude until 31 December 2022)

No.	Pos.	Nation	Player
—	FW	COL	Juan Peñaloza (at Águilas Doradas until 30 June 2022)
—	FW	ESP	Sandro Ramírez (at Getafe until 30 June 2022)

== Pre-season and friendlies ==
Win Draw Loss Fixtures

21 July 2021 Friendly	Osasuna	2–1	Huesca	Ribaforada, Spain
19:30 CEST (UTC+2)	Vidal 47'; Ávila 60'	Report	Escriche 6'	Stadium: Estadio San Bartolomé; Attendance: 800; Referee: David Recio Moreno

4 August 2021 Friendly	Huesca	1–0	Mallorca	Spain
20:00 CEST (UTC+2)	Seoane 21' (pen.)

== Competitions ==
=== Overall record ===
Competition	First match	Last match	Starting round	Final position	Record							
Competition	First match	Last match	Starting round	Final position	Pld	W	D	L	GF	GA	GD	Win %
Segunda División	13 August 2021	29 May 2022	Matchday 1	13th	42	13	15	14	49	44	+5	30.95
Copa del Rey	30 November 2021	14 December 2021	First round	Second round	2	1	0	1	2	1	+1	50.00
Total					44	14	15	15	51	45	+6	31.82

Source: Soccerway

=== Segunda División ===
==== League table ====
Pos	Team	Pld	W	D	L	GF	GA	GD	Pts
11	Burgos	42	15	10	17	41	41	0	55
12	Leganés	42	13	15	14	50	51	−1	54 (Note: Leganés finished ahead of Huesca on head-to-head points: Leganés 2–1 Huesca, Huesca 0–2 Leganés.)
13	Huesca	42	13	15	14	49	44	+5	54
14	Mirandés	42	15	7	20	58	62	−4	52 (Note: Mirandés finished ahead of Ibiza on head-to-head points: Mirandés 4–0 Ibiza, Ibiza 0–2 Mirandés.)
15	Ibiza	42	12	16	14	53	59	−6	52

Source: LaLiga SmartBank
Rules for classification: 1) points; 2) head-to-head points; 3) head-to-head goal difference; 4) goal difference; 5) number of goals scored

==== Results summary ====
Overall								Home						Away					
Pld	W	D	L	GF	GA	GD	Pts	W	D	L	GF	GA	GD	W	D	L	GF	GA	GD
42	13	15	14	49	44	+5	54	7	9	5	23	17	+6	6	6	9	26	27	−1

Source: La Liga SmartBank

==== Results by round ====
Round	1	2	3	4	5	6	7	8	9	10	11	12	13	14	15	16	17	18	19	20	21	22	23	24	25	26	27	28	29	30	31	32	33	34	35	36	37	38	39	40	41	42
Ground	H	H	A	H	A	H	A	H	A	A	H	A	H	A	H	A	H	A	H	A	H	H	A	H	A	H	A	H	A	H	A	H	A	H	A	H	A	A	H	A	H	A
Result	W	W	L	L	L	D	W	L	D	W	D	L	D	D	L	W	D	D	W	D	D	L	W	L	L	W	D	W	L	D	L	W	W	D	W	D	D	L	D	L	W	L
Position	3	1	4	7	11	11	7	11	12	9	9	12	12	14	15	14	14	14	12	12	11	14	12	15	15	13	14	12	12	15	15	15	11	11	9	9	11	12	11	12	11	13

Source: La Liga SmartBank
A = Away; H = Home; W = Win; D = Draw; L = Loss

==== Matches ====
The league fixtures were announced on 30 June 2021.

13 August 2021 1	Huesca	2–0	Eibar	Huesca
20:00 CEST (UTC+2)	Muñoz 21'; Seoane 68'	Report		Stadium: El Alcoraz; Attendance: 2,944; Referee: José Antonio López Toca

22 August 2021 2	Huesca	2–0	Cartagena	Huesca
22:00 CEST (UTC+2)	Delmás 53' (o.g.); Seoane 73'	Report		Stadium: El Alcoraz; Referee: Daniel Jesús Trujillo Suárez

27 August 2021 3	Las Palmas	2–1	Huesca	Las Palmas
19:00 WEST (UTC+1)	Jesé 6' (pen.); Pejiño 14'	Report	Miguel 90+4'	Stadium: Estadio Gran Canaria; Referee: Javier Iglesias Villanueva

6 September 2021 4	Huesca	1–2	Oviedo	Huesca
21:00 CEST (UTC+2)	Escriche 63'	Report	Bastón 12'; Obeng 80'	Stadium: El Alcoraz; Referee: Eduardo Prieto Iglesias

13 September 2021 5	Lugo	3–2	Huesca	Lugo
21:00 CEST (UTC+2)	Valentín 6'; Barreiro 83'; Cuéllar 86'	Report	Barreiro 35' (o.g.); Escriche 39'	Stadium: Estadio Anxo Carro; Referee: Saúl Ais Reig

19 September 2021 6	Huesca	0–0	Fuenlabrada	Huesca
14:00 CEST (UTC+2)				Stadium: El Alcoraz

24 September 2021 7	Real Sociedad B	0–2	Huesca	San Sebastián
20:00 CEST (UTC+2)				Stadium: Anoeta

27 November 2021 18	Almería	0–0	Huesca	Almería
18:15 CET	Sergio Akieme (yellow card) 83'	Report	Gaich (yellow card) 19'; Jorge Pulido (yellow card) 23'; Rațiu (yellow card) 32'; Joaquín Muñoz (yellow card) 33'; Miguel (yellow card) 90+6'	Stadium: Estadio de los Juegos Mediterráneos; Attendance: 9,486; Referee: David Gálvez Rascón

3 April 2022 34	Huesca	1–1	Almería	Huesca
18:15 CET	Ignasi Miquel 11'; Timor (yellow card) 61'; Joaquín Muñoz (yellow card) 89'	Report	Robertone 21'; Rodrigo Ely (yellow card) 23'; Sergio Akieme (red card) 65'; José Carlos Lazo (yellow card) 82'; Juan Villar (red card) 90+2'	Stadium: Estadio El Alcoraz; Attendance: 5,832; Referee: (Spain) José López Toca

10 April 2022 35	Fuenlabrada	2–3	Huesca	Fuenlabrada
CEST (UTC+2)

17 April 2022 36	Huesca	1–1	Zaragoza	Huesca
CEST (UTC+2)

22 April 2022 37	Tenerife	0–0	Huesca	Santa Cruz de Tenerife
CEST (UTC+2)

2 May 2022 38	Leganés	2–1	Huesca	Leganés
CEST (UTC+2)

7 May 2022 39	Huesca	1–1	Sporting Gijón	Huesca
CEST (UTC+2)

14 May 2022 40	Amorebieta	1–0	Huesca	Lezama
CEST (UTC+2)

21 May 2022 41	Huesca	3–2	Real Sociedad B	Huesca
CEST (UTC+2)

29 May 2022 42	Real Valladolid	3–0	Huesca	Valladolid
CEST (UTC+2)
