= 2023–24 SD Huesca season =

SD Huesca
2023–24 season
- President: Manuel Torres
- Head coach: José Ángel Ziganda (until 7 October); Antonio Hidalgo (from 11 October)
- Stadium: El Alcoraz
- Segunda División: 19th
- Copa del Rey: Round of 32
- Top goalscorer: League: Samuel Obeng (4); All: Samuel Obeng (4)
Home colours
- All statistics correct as of 1 November 2023.

The 2023–24 season is Sociedad Deportiva Huesca's 64th season in existence and third consecutive in the Segunda División, the second division of association football in Spain. They will also compete in the Copa del Rey.

== Players ==
=== First-team squad ===
As of 17 August 2023.

Note: Flags indicate national team as defined under FIFA eligibility rules; some limited exceptions apply. Players may hold more than one non-FIFA nationality.

No.	Pos.	Nation	Player
1	GK	ESP	Álvaro Fernández
2	DF	ROU	Andrei Rațiu
3	DF	ESP	Iván Martos
4	DF	ESP	Rubén Pulido
5	DF	ESP	Miguel Loureiro
7	MF	ESP	Gerard Valentín
8	FW	CMR	Patrick Soko
9	FW	GHA	Samuel Obeng (on loan from Oviedo)
10	FW	ESP	Dani Escriche
11	MF	ESP	Joaquín Muñoz
12	DF	ESP	Juanjo Nieto

No.	Pos.	Nation	Player
13	GK	ESP	Juan Pérez
14	DF	ESP	Jorge Pulido (captain)
15	DF	FRA	Jérémy Blasco
17	MF	FRA	Enzo Lombardo
18	FW	ESP	Rafa Tresaco
19	FW	GAM	Abou Kanté
20	DF	ESP	Ignasi Vilarrasa
22	MF	ESP	Iker Kortajarena
23	MF	ESP	Óscar Sielva
26	MF	GEQ	Álex Balboa (on loan from Alavés)
27	FW	ESP	Manu Rico

=== Reserve team ===
Note: Flags indicate national team as defined under FIFA eligibility rules; some limited exceptions apply. Players may hold more than one non-FIFA nationality.

No.	Pos.	Nation	Player
29	FW	ESP	Diego Aznar

=== Out on loan ===
Note: Flags indicate national team as defined under FIFA eligibility rules; some limited exceptions apply. Players may hold more than one non-FIFA nationality.

No.	Pos.	Nation	Player
—	DF	ESP	Hugo Anglada (at Talavera until 30 June 2024)
—	FW	COL	Juan Peñaloza (at Valmiera until 31 December 2023)

No.	Pos.	Nation	Player
—	FW	ESP	Kevin Carlos (at Yverdon-Sport until 30 June 2024)

== Transfers ==
=== In ===
Pos.	Player	Transferred from	Fee	Date	Source
MF	(Spain) Javi Martínez	(Spain) Osasuna	Loan	23 August 2023	

=== Out ===
Pos.	Player	Transferred to	Fee	Date	Source
GK	(Spain) Andrés Fernández	(Spain) Levante	Free	18 August 2023	
MF	(Cameroon) Patrick Soko	(Spain) Ibiza	Loan	24 August 2023	
FW	(Spain) Dani Escriche	(Spain) Albacete	€400,000	26 August 2023	
DF	(Romania) Andrei Rațiu	(Spain) Rayo Vallecano	€500,000	26 August 2023	

== Pre-season and friendlies ==
Win Draw Loss Fixtures

6 September 2023 Copa Pirineos	Huesca	3–0	Pau	Huesca
20:15 CEST (UTC+2)	Rico 35'; Vallejo 39'; Tresaco 49'	Report		Stadium: El Alcoraz

== Competitions ==
=== Overall record ===
Competition	First match	Last match	Starting round	Record							
Competition	First match	Last match	Starting round	Pld	W	D	L	GF	GA	GD	Win %
Segunda División	13 August 2023	2 June 2024	Matchday 1	21	5	7	9	16	18	−2	23.81
Copa del Rey	1 November 2023		First round	2	2	0	0	3	0	+3	100.00
Total				23	7	7	9	19	18	+1	30.43

Last updated: 21 December 2023
Source: Soccerway

=== Segunda División ===
==== League table ====
Pos	Team	Pld	W	D	L	GF	GA	GD	Pts	Qualification or relegation
15	Zaragoza	42	12	15	15	42	42	0	51 (Note: Albacete finished ahead of Cartagena and Zaragoza on head-to-head points: Albacete 6 pts, Cartagena 5 pts, Zaragoza 4 pts)	
16	Eldense	42	12	14	16	46	56	−10	50	
17	Huesca	42	11	16	15	36	33	+3	49 (Note: Huesca finished ahead of Mirandés on head-to-head points: Huesca 1–1 Mirandés, Mirandés 0–3 Huesca)	
18	Mirandés	42	12	13	17	47	55	−8	49	
19	Amorebieta (R)	42	11	12	19	37	53	−16	45	Relegation to Primera Federación

Updated to match(es) played on 2 Jun 2024. Source: LaLiga HyperMotion
Rules for classification: 1) Points; 2) Head-to-head points; 3) Head-to-head goal difference; 4) Goal difference; 5) Goals scored; 6) Fair-play points
(Note: Head-to-head record is used only after all the matches between the teams in question have been played)
(R) Relegated

==== Results summary ====
Overall								Home						Away					
Pld	W	D	L	GF	GA	GD	Pts	W	D	L	GF	GA	GD	W	D	L	GF	GA	GD
42	11	16	15	36	33	+3	49	5	7	9	17	20	−3	6	9	6	19	13	+6

Source: LaLiga.com

==== Results by round ====
Round	1	2	3	4	5	6	7	8	9	10
Ground	A	H	A	H	A	H	A	H	A	H
Result	D	L	D	D	L	D	W	L	L	
Position	15	19	20	19	21	20				

Updated to match(es) played on 29 October 2023. Source: LaLiga.com
A = Away; H = Home; W = Win; D = Draw; L = Loss

==== Matches ====
The league fixtures were unveiled on 28 June 2023.

13 August 2023 1	Burgos	1–1	Huesca	Burgos
17:00 CEST (UTC+2)	Sánchez 35' (pen.); Miki (yellow card) 39'; Niño (yellow card) 41'	Report	Vilarrasa 10'; Nieto (yellow card) 35'; Kortajarena (yellow card) 41'; Balboa (yellow card) 80'; Pulido (yellow card) 90+6'	Stadium: El Plantío; Attendance: 7,358; Referee: Andrés Fuentes Molina

21 August 2023 2	Huesca	0–2	Tenerife	Huesca
21:30 CEST (UTC+2)		Report	López 14'; Gallego (yellow card) 24'; Corredera (yellow card) 45'; Medrano (yellow card) 46'; Rubio 50'; Cruz (yellow card) 57'	Stadium: El Alcoraz; Attendance: 5,434; Referee: José Antonio López Toca

28 August 2023 3	Racing Santander	0–0	Huesca	Santander
21:30 CEST (UTC+2)		Report		Stadium: Campos de Sport de El Sardinero; Attendance: 13,043; Referee: Miguel Sesma Espinosa

3 September 2023 4	Huesca	1–1	Mirandés	Huesca
21:00 CEST (UTC+2)	Martínez 55'	Report	Martín 84' (pen.)	Stadium: El Alcoraz; Referee: Rubén Ávalos Barrera

9 September 2023 5	Leganés	2–0	Huesca	Leganés
21:00 CEST (UTC+2)	Miramón 42'; Franquesa 77'	Report		Stadium: Estadio Municipal de Butarque; Attendance: 6,948; Referee: Dámaso Arcediano Monescillo

16 September 2023 6	Huesca	2–2	Villarreal B	Huesca
16:15 CEST (UTC+2)	Loureiro 54'; Sielva 90+2'	Report	Forés 15'; Ontiveros 31'	Stadium: El Alcoraz; Referee: Salvador Lax Franco

23 September 2023 7	Alcorcón	0–2	Huesca	Alcorcón
21:00 CEST (UTC+2)	Eteki (yellow card) 45+1'; Mosquera (yellow card) 67'	Report	Mier (yellow card) 7'; Loureiro 21'; Obeng 25'	Stadium: Estadio Municipal de Santo Domingo; Referee: Iván Caparrós Hernández

1 October 2023 8	Huesca	0–1	Sporting Gijón	Huesca
21:00 CEST (UTC+2)		Report		Stadium: El Alcoraz; Referee: Manuel Jesús Orellana Cid

4 October 2023 9	Oviedo	1–0	Huesca	Oviedo
19:00 CEST (UTC+2)		Report		Stadium: Estadio Carlos Tartiere; Referee: Germán Cid Camacho

7 October 2023 10	Huesca	0–1	Eldense	Huesca
16:15 CEST (UTC+2)		Report	Soberón 90+6'	Stadium: El Alcoraz; Referee: Adrián Cordero Vega

15 October 2023 11	Eibar	1–1	Huesca	Eibar
18:30 CEST (UTC+2)				Stadium: Ipurua Municipal Stadium

24 March 2024 32	Huesca	v	Burgos	Huesca
16:15 CET (UTC+1)				Stadium: El Alcoraz

30 March 2024 33	Albacete	v	Huesca	Albacete
18:30 CET (UTC+1)				Stadium: Carlos Belmonte

2 June 2024 42	Huesca	v	Levante	Huesca
				Stadium: Estadio El Alcoraz

=== Copa del Rey ===
1 November 2023 First round	Águilas	0–1	Huesca	Águilas
19:00 CET (UTC+1)		Report	Juanjo 25'	Stadium: Estadio El Rubial; Referee: Saúl Ais Reig
