= Andrei Rațiu =

Romanian footballer (born 1998)

Personal information
- Full name: Andrei Florin Rațiu
- Date of birth: 20 June 1998 (age 28)
- Place of birth: Aiud, Romania
- Height: 1.83 m (6 ft 0 in)
- Position: Right-back

Team information
- Current team: Rayo Vallecano
- Number: 2

Youth career
- Águaviva
- –2010: Andorra
- 2010–2016: Villarreal

Senior career*
| Years | Team | Apps | (Gls) |
| 2016–2018 | Villarreal C | 65 | (4) |
| 2017–2021 | Villarreal B | 58 | (1) |
| 2019–2021 | Villarreal | 0 | (0) |
| 2020–2021 | → ADO Den Haag (loan) | 10 | (0) |
| 2021–2023 | Huesca | 72 | (3) |
| 2023– | Rayo Vallecano | 91 | (3) |

International career^{‡}
| 2019–2020 | Romania U21 | 3 | (0) |
| 2021 | Romania U23 | 6 | (0) |
| 2021– | Romania | 43 | (2) |
- * Club domestic league appearances and goals as of 22 November 2026 ‡ National team caps and goals as of 17 November 2026

Andrei Florin Rațiu (Romanian pronunciation: [anˈdrej floˈrin ˈrat͡sju]; born 20 June 1998) is a Romanian professional footballer who plays as a right-back for La Liga club Rayo Vallecano and the Romania national team.

Rațiu progressed through the Villarreal youth academy, but did not make his debut for the first team. After a loan spell at Dutch club ADO Den Haag between 2020 and 2021, he moved to Huesca. Two years later, he transferred to Rayo Vallecano, with which he registered his La Liga debut.

Rațiu made his senior international debut for Romania in September 2021, in a 2–0 win over Iceland. He represented the country in the UEFA Euro 2024.

== Club career ==
=== Early career and Villarreal ===
Born in Aiud, Alba County, Rațiu moved to Aragon, Spain in childhood and joined Villarreal's youth setup from Andorra CF. He made his senior debut with the C-team on 20 August 2016, coming on as a second-half substitute in a 2–2 Tercera División away draw against Alzira. Rațiu scored his first senior goal on 14 September 2016, netting the opener in a 2–1 away defeat of Elche Ilicitano.

After being regularly used with the C-side, Rațiu made his debut for the reserves on 17 December 2017, replacing Darío Poveda late into a 3–2 home win against Peña Deportiva in the Segunda División B championship. He was definitely promoted to the B-team in August 2018, being regularly used afterwards. He made his first team debut the following 18 April, starting in a 2–0 derby loss at Valencia for the season's UEFA Europa League.

On 4 August 2020, Rațiu was loaned to Eredivisie side ADO Den Haag for the campaign. He returned to his parent club the following 29 January, after 12 appearances.

=== Huesca ===
On 4 August 2021, Rațiu signed a three-year contract with Huesca, recently relegated to Segunda División. He scored his first professional goal on 21 May 2022, netting his team's second in a 3–2 home win over Real Sociedad B.

=== Rayo Vallecano ===
On 26 August 2023, Rațiu agreed to a five-year deal with La Liga side Rayo Vallecano. He made his debut on 1 November, in a 6–0 Copa del Rey thrashing of Atlético Lugones in which he also scored. Four days later, he played the full 90 minutes in a goalless league away draw at Real Madrid.

== International career ==
On 2 September 2021, Rațiu made his debut for the Romanian national team in a 2–0 victory over Iceland in the 2022 World Cup qualifiers, starting the match and coming off after 68 minutes. On 26 September 2022, he scored his first goal in a 4–1 defeat of Bosnia and Herzegovina, which had already won its UEFA Nations League group at that point.

In 2023, Rațiu made five appearances in the Euro 2024 qualifiers, which included a start in the final 1–0 victory over Switzerland. Romania emerged as Group I winners, maintaining an undefeated record throughout. On 7 June 2024, he was chosen by Edward Iordănescu in the squad for the final tournament. Rațiu started in all four matches, as the nation won its group but was eliminated by the Netherlands in the round of 16. His speed and blue-dyed hair during the tournament led to him being nicknamed "Sonic", inspired by Japanese character Sonic the Hedgehog.

== Career statistics ==
=== Club ===
As of match played 22 November 2026

Appearances and goals by club, season and competition
| Club | Season | League | | | National cup (Note: Includes KNVB Cup, Copa del Rey) | | Europe | | Other | | Total | |
| Club | Season | Division | Apps | Goals | Apps | Goals | Apps | Goals | Apps | Goals | Apps | Goals |
|---|---|---|---|---|---|---|---|---|---|---|---|---|
| Villarreal C | 2016–17 | Tercera División | 36 | 2 | — | | — | | — | | 36 | 1 |
| Villarreal C | 2017–18 | Tercera División | 29 | 2 | — | | — | | — | | 30 | 1 |
| Villarreal C | Total | | 65 | 4 | — | | — | | — | | 65 | 4 |
| Villarreal B | 2017–18 | Segunda División B | 1 | 0 | — | | — | | — | | 1 | 0 |
| Villarreal B | 2018–19 | Segunda División B | 28 | 1 | — | | — | | 2 (Note: Appearances in Segunda División B promotion play-offs) | 0 | 30 | 1 |
| Villarreal B | 2019–20 | Segunda División B | 21 | 0 | — | | — | | — | | 21 | 0 |
| Villarreal B | 2020–21 | Segunda División B | 8 | 0 | — | | — | | — | | 8 | 0 |
| Villarreal B | Total | | 58 | 1 | — | | — | | 2 | 0 | 60 | 1 |
| Villarreal | 2018–19 | La Liga | 0 | 0 | 0 | 0 | 1 (Note: Appearance in UEFA Europa League) | 0 | — | | 1 | 0 |
| ADO Den Haag (loan) | 2020–21 | Eredivisie | 10 | 0 | 2 | 0 | — | | — | | 12 | 0 |
| Huesca | 2021–22 | Segunda División | 34 | 1 | 0 | 0 | — | | — | | 34 | 1 |
| Huesca | 2022–23 | Segunda División | 38 | 2 | 1 | 0 | — | | — | | 39 | 2 |
| Huesca | Total | | 72 | 3 | 1 | 0 | — | | — | | 73 | 3 |
| Rayo Vallecano | 2023–24 | La Liga | 12 | 0 | 4 | 1 | — | | — | | 16 | 1 |
| Rayo Vallecano | 2024–25 | La Liga | 35 | 2 | 1 | 0 | — | | — | | 36 | 2 |
| Rayo Vallecano | 2025–26 | La Liga | 35 | 0 | 2 | 0 | 13 (Note: Appearances in UEFA Conference League) | 1 | — | | 50 | 1 |
| Rayo Vallecano | 2026–27 | La Liga | 9 | 1 | 0 | 0 | — | | — | | 9 | 1 |
| Rayo Vallecano | Total | | 91 | 3 | 7 | 1 | 13 | 1 | — | | 111 | 5 |
| Career total | | | 296 | 11 | 10 | 1 | 14 | 1 | 2 | 0 | 322 | 13 |

=== International ===
As of match played 17 November 2026

Appearances and goals by national team and year
| National team | Year | Apps | Goals |
|---|---|---|---|
| Romania | 2021 | 5 | 0 |
| Romania | 2022 | 5 | 1 |
| Romania | 2023 | 5 | 0 |
| Romania | 2024 | 12 | 0 |
| Romania | 2025 | 9 | 1 |
| Romania | 2026 | 7 | 0 |
| Total | | 43 | 2 |

Scores and results list Romania's goal tally first, score column indicates score after each Rațiu goal.

List of international goals scored by Andrei Rațiu
| No. | Date | Venue | Opponent | Score | Result | Competition |
|---|---|---|---|---|---|---|
| 1 | 26 September 2022 | Stadionul Rapid-Giulești, Bucharest, Romania | Bosnia and Herzegovina | 3–1 | 4–1 | 2022–23 UEFA Nations League B |
| 2 | 18 November 2025 | Ilie Oană, Ploiești, Romania | San Marino | 6–1 | 7–1 | 2026 FIFA World Cup qualification |

== Honours ==
Rayo Vallecano

- UEFA Conference League runner-up: 2025–26

Individual

- Gazeta Sporturilor Romanian Footballer of the Year: 2025
- La Liga Team of the Season: 2024–25
- UEFA Conference League Team of the Season: 2025–26
