= Miguel San Román =

Spanish footballer (born 1997)

Personal information
- Full name: Miguel San Román Ferrándiz
- Date of birth: 14 July 1997 (age 29)
- Place of birth: Benidorm, Spain
- Height: 1.89 m (6 ft 2 in)
- Position: Goalkeeper

Youth career
- 2011–2016: Atlético Madrid

Senior career*
Years	Team	Apps	(Gls)
2016–2021	Atlético Madrid B	83	(0)
2019–2020	→ Elche (loan)	4	(0)
2021	Atlético Madrid	0	(0)
2021–2023	Huesca	0	(0)
2023	Ponferradina	5	(0)
2023–2025	Elche	17	(0)
2025–2026	Leganés	0	(0)
- * Club domestic league appearances and goals as of 19 June 2025

Miguel San Román Ferrándiz (born 14 July 1997) is a Spanish footballer who plays as a goalkeeper.

== Club career ==
San Román was born in Benidorm, Alicante, Valencian Community, and was an Atlético Madrid youth graduate. He made his senior debut with the reserves on 20 November 2016, starting in a 1–1 Tercera División home draw against CF Pozuelo de Alarcón.

San Román became a regular starter after the departure of Bernabé Barragán, and renewed his contract until 2021 on 27 March 2018. On 23 July 2019, he was loaned to Segunda División side Elche CF for the season.

San Román made his Elche debut on 17 December 2019, starting in a 2–0 Copa del Rey away defeat of Gimnástica Segoviana CF. Four days later he made his league debut, playing the full 90 minutes in a 1–0 win at Albacete Balompié as starter Édgar Badía was unavailable. Upon returning, he was a third-choice option at Atleti behind Jan Oblak and Ivo Grbić, and made his first team debut on 6 January 2021 by starting in a 0–1 away loss against UE Cornellà, also for the national cup.

On 11 August 2021, San Román signed a two-year contract with SD Huesca in the second level. After only featuring twice (both cup matches), he moved to fellow league team SD Ponferradina on 20 January 2023.

On 11 July 2023, after Ponfe's relegation, San Román returned to his former side Elche on a two-year contract. He spent his spell at the club as a backup to Matías Dituro, and joined CD Leganés on 16 July 2025.

== Personal life ==
San Román comes from a family of goalkeepers: his father Juan Miguel played for Atleti's reserves before resuming his career in the Segunda División B, while his grand-uncle, also named Miguel, was a first team player during the 1960s. He won 20/21 La Liga Title.

== Career statistics ==
=== Club ===
As of match played 7 April 2025

Appearances and goals by club, season and competition
Club	Season	League			National Cup		Continental		Other		Total	
Club	Season	Division	Apps	Goals	Apps	Goals	Apps	Goals	Apps	Goals	Apps	Goals
Atlético Madrid B	2016–17	Tercera División	15	0	—		—		2 (Note: Appearance(s) in promotion play-offs)	0	17	0
Atlético Madrid B	2017–18	Segunda División B	29	0	—		—		—		29	0
Atlético Madrid B	2018–19	Segunda División B	23	0	—		—		2	0	25	0
Atlético Madrid B	2020–21	Segunda División B	8	0	—		—		—		8	0
Atlético Madrid B	Total		75	0	—		—		4	0	79	0
Atlético Madrid	2017–18	La Liga	0	0	0	0	0	0	—		0	0
Atlético Madrid	2020–21	La Liga	0	0	1	0	0	0	—		1	0
Atlético Madrid	Total		0	0	1	0	0	0	—		1	0
Elche (loan)	2019–20	Segunda División	4	0	3	0	—		0	0	7	0
Huesca	2021–22	Segunda División	0	0	2	0	—		—		2	0
Huesca	2022–23	Segunda División	0	0	1	0	—		—		1	0
Huesca	Total		0	0	3	0	—		—		3	0
Ponferradina	2022–23	Segunda División	5	0	2	0	—		—		5	0
Elche	2023–24	Segunda División	14	0	1	0	—		—		15	0
Elche	2024–25	Segunda División	3	0	4	0	—		—		7	0
Elche	Total		17	0	5	0	—		—		22	0
Career total			101	0	12	0	0	0	4	0	117	0
