= Álex Balboa =

Equatoguinean footballer (born 2001)

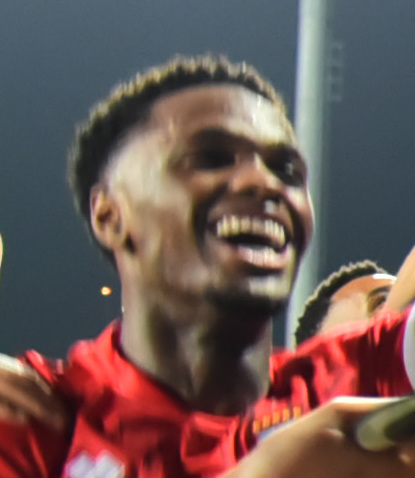
- Balboa with Equatorial Guinea in 2022

Personal information
- Full name: Alejandro Balboa Bandeira
- Date of birth: 6 March 2001 (age 25)
- Place of birth: Vitoria-Gasteiz, Spain
- Height: 1.81 m (5 ft 11 in)
- Position: Midfielder

Team information
- Current team: Valladolid

Youth career
- 2005–2013: Aurrerá Vitoria
- 2013–2020: Alavés

Senior career*
| Years | Team | Apps | (Gls) |
| 2020–2021 | San Ignacio | 11 | (2) |
| 2021–2023 | Alavés B | 37 | (0) |
| 2022–2024 | Alavés | 11 | (0) |
| 2023–2024 | → Huesca (loan) | 13 | (1) |
| 2024–2025 | Almere City | 10 | (1) |
| 2025–2026 | Lugo | 34 | (3) |
| 2026– | Valladolid | 0 | (0) |

International career^{‡}
| 2021– | Equatorial Guinea | 16 | (0) |
- * Club domestic league appearances and goals as of 9 June 2026 ‡ National team caps and goals as of 9 September 2024

Alejandro 'Álex' Balboa Bandeira (born 6 March 2001) is a professional footballer who plays as a midfielder for Segunda División club Valladolid. Born in Spain, he plays for the Equatorial Guinea national team.

== Early life ==
Balboa was born in Vitoria-Gasteiz to Equatoguinean parents. His maternal grandfather is originally from São Tomé and Príncipe. His paternal side, the Balboa, is of distant Cuban descent.

== Club career ==
Balboa joined Deportivo Alavés' youth setup in 2013, from CD Aurrerá de Vitoria. He made his senior debut with farm team Club San Ignacio during the 2020–21 season in Tercera División, but finished the campaign playing with the reserves in Segunda División B.

Balboa made his first team debut on 30 November 2021, starting in a 3–0 away win over Unami CP, for the season's Copa del Rey. He made his professional debut on 13 August of the following year, coming on as a late substitute for Jon Guridi in a 2–1 Segunda División away win over CD Leganés.

On 12 July 2023, Balboa renewed his contract with the Babazorros until 2026, and moved on loan to SD Huesca in the second division on 8 August.

In July 2024, Balboa joined Eredivisie club Almere City on a two-year deal with the option for a third. On 1 July of the following year, he signed for Primera Federación club Lugo on a one-year deal with the option for a second.

On 25 July 2026, Valladolid announced the signing of Balboa on a two-year contract.

== International career ==
Balboa made his senior debut for Equatorial Guinea on 7 September 2021.

== Personal life ==
Balboa's uncle is former Real Madrid footballer Javier Balboa, who also played for the Equatorial Guinea national football team.

== Career statistics ==
=== Club ===
As of 09 February 2025

| Club | Season | League | | | National Cup | | Total | |
| Club | Season | Division | Apps | Goals | Apps | Goals | Apps | Goals |
|---|---|---|---|---|---|---|---|---|
| San Ignacio | 2020-21 | Tercera División | 11 | 2 | — | | 11 | 2 |
| Alavés B | 2020-21 | Segunda División B | 15 | 0 | — | | 15 | 0 |
| Alavés B | 2021-22 | Tercera División | 20 | 0 | — | | 20 | 0 |
| Alavés B | 2022-23 | Segunda Federación | 2 | 0 | — | | 2 | 0 |
| Alavés B | Total | | 37 | 0 | — | | 37 | 0 |
| Alavés | 2021-22 | La Liga | 0 | 0 | 1 | 0 | 1 | 0 |
| Alavés | 2022-23 | Segunda División | 11 | 0 | 4 | 0 | 15 | 0 |
| Alavés | 2023-24 | La Liga | 0 | 0 | — | | 0 | 0 |
| Alavés | Total | | 11 | 0 | 5 | 0 | 16 | 0 |
| Huesca (loan) | 2023-24 | Segunda División | 10 | 0 | 1 | 0 | 11 | 0 |
| Almere City | 2024-25 | Eredivisie | 4 | 0 | 0 | 0 | 4 | 0 |
| Career Total | | | 73 | 2 | 6 | 0 | 79 | 2 |

=== International ===
As of 10 June 2024

Equatorial Guinea
| Year | Apps | Goals |
|---|---|---|
| 2021 | 4 | 0 |
| 2022 | 3 | 0 |
| 2023 | 4 | 0 |
| 2024 | 4 | 0 |
| Total | 12 | 0 |
