= Isidro Pitta =

Paraguayan footballer (born 1999)

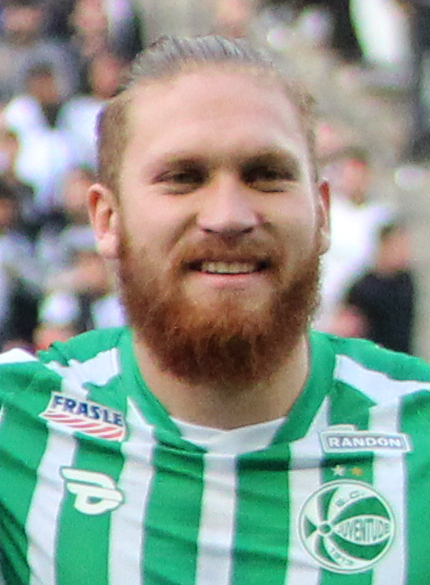
- Pitta with Juventude in 2022.

Personal information
- Full name: Isidro Miguel Pitta Saldivar
- Date of birth: 14 August 1999 (age 27)
- Place of birth: Asunción, Paraguay
- Height: 1.83 m (6 ft 0 in)
- Position: Forward

Team information
- Current team: Red Bull Bragantino
- Number: 9

Youth career
- 2013–2017: Cerro Porteño

Senior career*
Years	Team	Apps	(Gls)
2017–2018	Alvarenga	14	(5)
2019	Deportivo Santaní	26	(6)
2020	Sportivo Luqueño	16	(7)
2020–2021	Olimpia	15	(4)
2021–2022	Huesca	14	(2)
2022	→ Juventude (loan)	32	(5)
2023–2024	Cuiabá	71	(24)
2025–	Red Bull Bragantino	48	(12)

International career^{‡}
2024–	Paraguay	6	(0)
- * Club domestic league appearances and goals as of 7 April 2026 ‡ National team caps and goals as of 21 June 2026

Isidro Miguel Pitta Saldivar (born 14 August 1999) is a Paraguayan footballer who plays as a forward for Campeonato Brasileiro Série A club Red Bull Bragantino and the Paraguay national team.

== Club career ==
=== Early career ===
Born in Asunción, Pitta was formed at the Cerro Porteño youth academy from 2014 to 2017, where he was leading goal scorer for its teams. His playing style at Cerro Porteño was an area-man.

=== Alvarenga ===
Pitta briefly played for Portuguese club Alvarenga in Arouca for six months during the 2017–18 season, where he scored 5 goals in 14 matches. Upon returning to Paraguay from Portugal, Pitta trialed for Primera División Paraguaya club Guaraní.

=== Deportivo Santani ===
In 2019, Pitta signed a two-year contract with Deportivo Santaní. Whilst at Deportivo Santani, Pitta was represented by Juan Dragotto.

In March 2019, Pitta debuted and scored in the same game for Deportivo Santaní against Olimpia Asunción. He entered the pitch at the 13th minute of the first half, then scored his goal in the second half of a game which ended in a 2–2 draw.

Amongst other clubs in Paraguay, Argentina and Chile, Universidad de Chile were interested in Pitta during 2019.

In December 2019, Paraguayan Periodic HOY announced that Pitta would join Sportivo Luqueño for the 2020 season and had departed Deportivo Santani, who descended to the country's second-tier.

=== Sportivo Luqueño ===
In August 2020, Pitta was in the interest of Argentine club Union de Santa Fé after scoring three goals in three games following the recommencement of the 2020 season. In September 2020, Tigo Sports announced that Pitta was in the orbit of Primera División Argentina club Independiente. Independiente unsuccessfully submitted a loan offer for Pitta with an option to buy him.

=== Olimpia ===
In September 2020, Pitta joined Club Olimpia of Asunción from Sportivo Luqueño for the remainder of the 2020 season and the 2020 Copa Libertadores group stage. Prior to the transfer, Pitta had scored 8 goals and created 4 assists in 18 league games for Sportivo Luqueño during the 2020 season.

=== Huesca ===
On 16 August 2021, Pitta moved to Spain and signed a four-year contract with Segunda División side SD Huesca. He scored his first goals abroad on 24 September, netting a brace in a 2–0 away win over Real Sociedad B.

==== Loan to Juventude ====
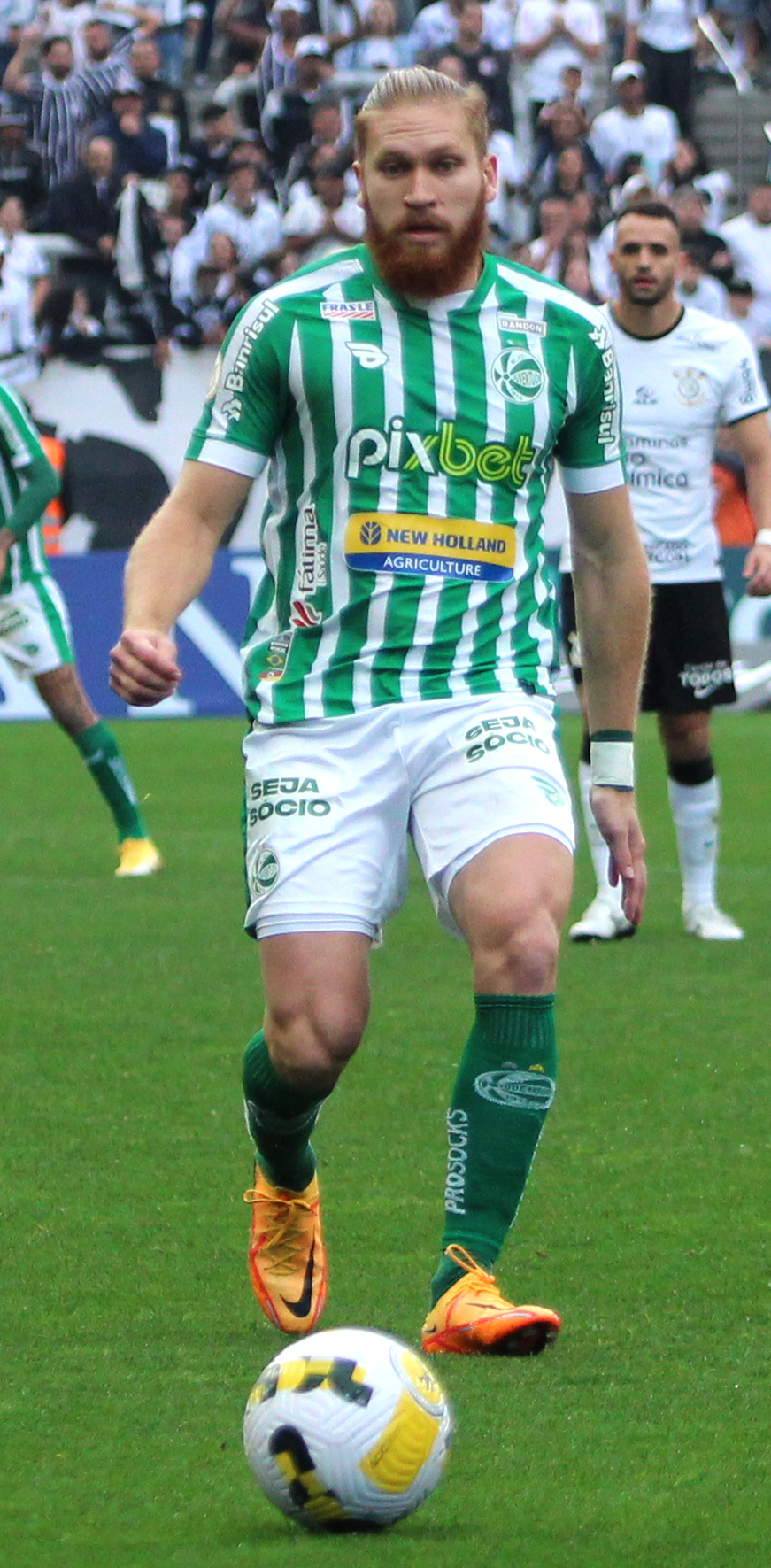
Pitta playing for Juventude in 2022

On 28 January 2022, Pitta switched teams and countries again after signing a one-year loan deal with Campeonato Brasileiro Série A side Juventude. He has been a regular starter for the club, but his team was relegated at the end of the season.

=== Cuiabá ===
On 21 December 2022, Pitta signed a four-year contract with Cuiabá, another Campeonato Brasileiro Série A club.

== International career ==
Pitta made his debut for the Paraguay national team on 6 September 2024 in a World Cup qualifier against Uruguay at the Estadio Centenario. He started the game and played 61 minutes, as the game ended with the score of 0–0.

On 1 June 2026, he was named by head coach Gustavo Alfaro in Paraguay's 26-man squad for the 2026 FIFA World Cup.

== Personal life ==
Pitta's appearance is likened to Ragnar Lodbrok from the successful series Vikings. He is nicknamed Viking and he celebrates his goals with the same celebration as Conor McGregor.

== Career statistics ==
=== Club ===
As of 8 November 2024

Appearances and goals by club, season and competition
Club	Season	League			National cup (Note: Includes Copa del Rey, Copa do Brasil)		Continental		State league		Other		Total	
Club	Season	Division	Apps	Goals	Apps	Goals	Apps	Goals	Apps	Goals	Apps	Goals	Apps	Goals
Alvarenga	2014–15	Aveiro FA Elite	14	5	—		—		—		—		14	5
Deportivo Santaní	2019	Paraguayan Primera División	26	6	—		2 (Note: Appearance(s) in Copa Sudamericana)	0	—		—		28	6
Sportivo Luqueño	2020	Paraguayan Primera División	16	7	—		2	1	—		—		18	8
Olimpia	2020	Paraguayan Primera División	4	1	—		4 (Note: Appearance(s) in Copa Libertadores)	1	—		—		8	2
Olimpia	2021	Paraguayan Primera División	11	3	—		6	2	—		—		17	5
Olimpia	Total		15	4	—		10	3	—		—		25	7
Huesca	2021–22	Segunda División	14	2	2	0	—		—		—		16	2
Juventude	2022	Série A	32	5	3	2	—		7 (Note: Appearance(s) in Campeonato Gaúcho)	1	—		42	8
Cuiabá	2023	Série A	29	5	1	0	—		11 (Note: Appearance(s) in Campeonato Mato-Grossense)	6	5 (Note: Appearance(s) in Copa Verde)	1	46	12
Cuiabá	2024	Série A	31	7	4	1	8	4	11	6	4	4	58	22
Cuiabá	2025	Série A	0	0	0	0	0	0	0	0	0	0	0	0
Cuiabá	Total		60	12	5	1	6	4	24	13	9	4	104	33
Career total			177	41	10	3	25	9	26	13	9	4	247	70

=== International ===
As of match played 19 June 2026

Appearances and goals by national team and year
National team	Year	Apps	Goals
Paraguay	2024	5	0
2025	0	0	
2026	1	0	
Total		6	0

== Honours ==
Olimpia

- Paraguayan Primera División: 2020 (Clausura)

Cuiaba

- Campeonato Mato-Grossense:2023, 2024
