= Diego Aznar =

Spanish footballer (born 2003)

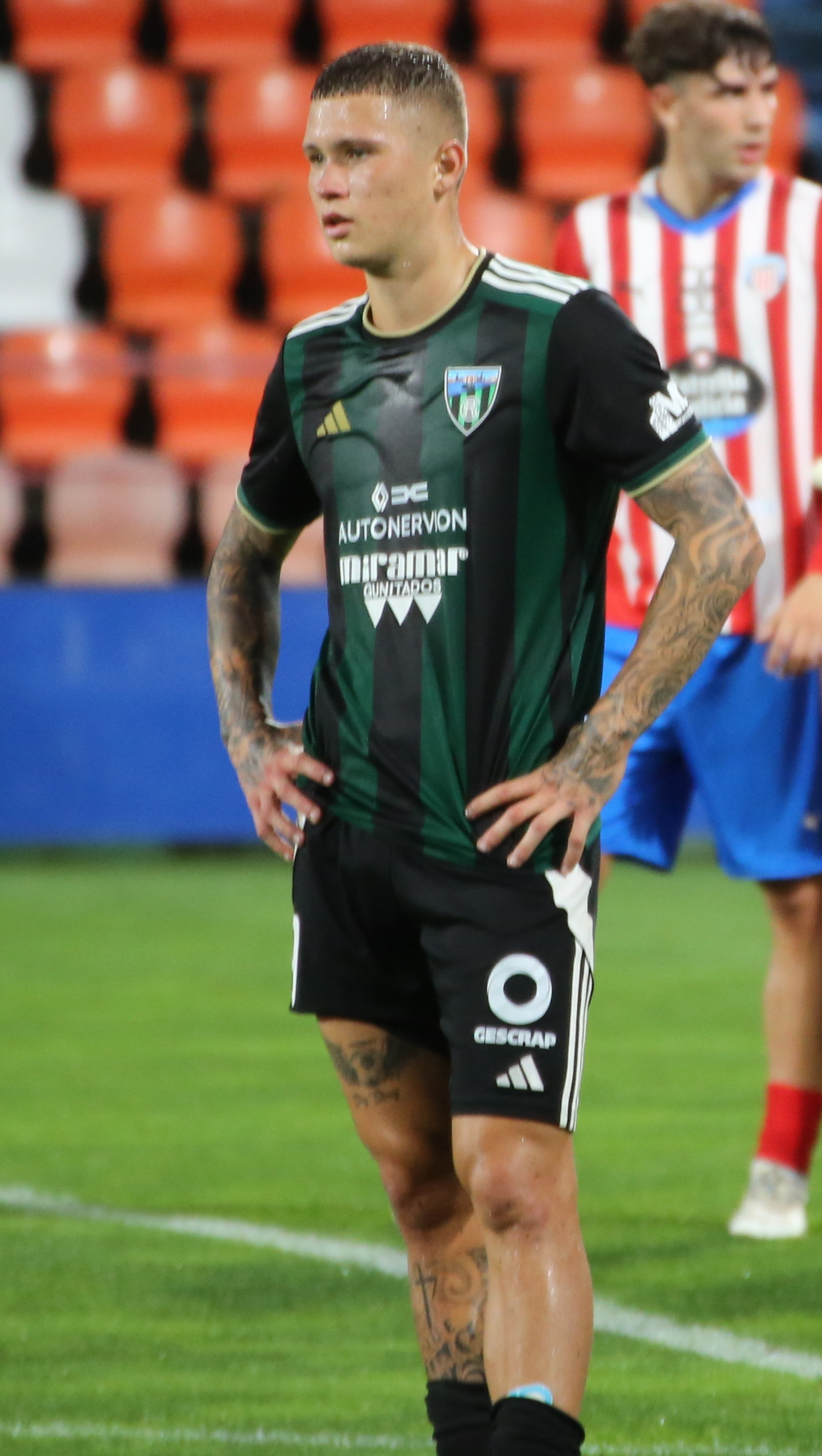
- Aznar with Sestao River in 2024

Personal information
- Full name: Diego Aznar Valero
- Date of birth: 20 September 2003 (age 23)
- Place of birth: Zaragoza, Spain
- Position: Forward

Team information
- Current team: Huesca
- Number: 31

Youth career
- El Olivar
- Amistad
- Zaragoza
- Montecarlo
- 2021–2022: Osasuna

Senior career*
Years	Team	Apps	(Gls)
2022–2023	Huesca B	29	(23)
2023–	Huesca	6	(0)
2024	→ Valencia B (loan)	13	(3)
2024–2025	→ Sestao River (loan)	33	(8)
- * Club domestic league appearances and goals as of 28 November 2025

Diego Aznar Valero (born 20 September 2003) is a Spanish professional footballer who plays as a forward for SD Huesca.

== Club career ==
Born in Zaragoza, Aznar represented EM El Olivar, UD Amistad, Real Zaragoza and UD Montecarlo before moving to CA Osasuna on 7 July 2021. In 2022, after a few weeks on trial, he signed for SD Huesca and was initially assigned to the reserves in Tercera Federación.

Aznar made his senior debut on 11 September 2022, coming on as a second-half substitute for Rafa Tresaco and scoring the B's equalizer in a 1–1 away draw against CD Cuarte. In January 2023, after scoring 17 goals in 16 matches for the B-side (which included a hat-trick against Cuarte), he was nicknamed the "Aragonese Haaland".

Aznar made his first team debut on 6 May 2023, replacing Cristian Salvador late into a 2–1 Segunda División away loss against CD Leganés. On 19 January 2024, he was loaned to Segunda Federación side Valencia CF Mestalla until the end of the season.

On 6 July 2024, Aznar joined Primera Federación side Sestao River Club on a one-year loan deal.
