= Arnau Ortiz =

Spanish footballer (born 2001)

Personal information
- Full name: Arnau Ortiz Sánchez
- Date of birth: 29 October 2001 (age 25)
- Place of birth: Figueres, Spain
- Height: 1.75 m (5 ft 9 in)
- Position: Winger

Team information
- Current team: Atlético Madrid
- Number: 16

Youth career
- 2007–2019: Figueres

Senior career*
Years	Team	Apps	(Gls)
2019–2021	Peralada	50	(8)
2021–2022	Girona B	15	(3)
2022	→ Peña Deportiva (loan)	14	(4)
2022–2024	Girona	0	(0)
2022–2023	→ Murcia (loan)	31	(5)
2023–2024	→ Eldense (loan)	9	(0)
2024	→ Cartagena (loan)	14	(0)
2024–2025	Śląsk Wrocław	33	(3)
2024	Śląsk Wrocław II	2	(0)
2025–2026	Atlético Madrid B	36	(23)
2026–	Atlético Madrid	5	(0)
- * Club domestic league appearances and goals as of 16 September 2026

Arnau Ortiz Sánchez (born 29 October 2001) is a Spanish professional footballer who plays as a left winger for La Liga club Atlético Madrid.

== Career ==
=== Girona ===
Born in Figueres, Girona, Catalonia, Ortiz joined the youth sides of hometown club Figueres at the age of five, and left in 2019 to join Girona, being initially assigned to farm team Peralada in the Tercera División. He made his senior debut on 5 September of that year, coming on as a second-half substitute in a 4–2 away loss against Sants.

Ortiz scored his first senior goal on 5 January 2020, netting the equalizer in a 1–1 draw at former side Figueres. On 13 February, he renewed his contract until 2022.

Ortiz started the 2021–22 campaign with Girona B in the Tercera División RFEF, after the club's link with Peralada ended. On 29 January 2022, he was loaned to Segunda División RFEF side Peña Deportiva until June.

On 14 July 2022, Ortiz moved to Primera Federación side Real Murcia on loan for the season. On 21 June of the following year, he renewed his contract with Girona until 2026, and was loaned to Eldense in the Segunda División on 11 July 2023.

Ortiz made his professional debut on 13 August 2023, starting in a 1–0 away win over Cartagena. The following 18 January, he moved to the Efesé on loan for the remainder of the season.

=== Śląsk Wrocław ===
On 18 July 2024, Ortiz signed a two-year deal with Polish Ekstraklasa club Śląsk Wrocław. He scored his first professional goal on 22 November, netting the opener in a 2–2 away draw against Jagiellonia Białystok.

=== Atlético Madrid ===
On 1 September 2025, Ortiz returned to Spain to join Atlético Madrid's reserve side, Atlético Madrileño, for a reported fee of €300,000. With the side, he finished the 2025–26 campaign with 23 goals, being the top scorer of the third division.

Ortiz spent the entire 2026 pre-season with Atleti's first team, scoring in friendlies against Getafe and Manchester United and providing an assist against Olympique de Marseille. On 17 August of that year, he was registered in the main squad and assigned the number 16 jersey, and made his La Liga debut two days later by starting in a 2–0 home win over Málaga CF.

== Honours ==
Śląsk Wrocław II

- III liga, group III: 2024–25
