= Eusebio Monzó =

Spanish footballer

Personal information
- Full name: Eusebio Monzó Alfonso
- Date of birth: 4 December 2000 (age 25)
- Place of birth: Valencia, Spain
- Height: 1.88 m (6 ft 2 in)
- Position: Centre back

Team information
- Current team: Utiel

Youth career
- Levante

Senior career*
Years	Team	Apps	(Gls)
2019–2021	Levante B	11	(0)
2020	→ La Nucía (loan)	0	(0)
2021–2022	Huesca B	31	(1)
2022–2023	Huesca	3	(0)
2023	→ SS Reyes (loan)	18	(0)
2023–2024	Compostela	22	(1)
2025–	Utiel	9	(0)
- * Club domestic league appearances and goals as of 9 November 2025

Eusebio Monzó Alfonso (born 4 December 2000) is a Spanish footballer who plays for Tercera Federación club Utiel. Mainly a central defender, he can also play as a left back.

== Club career ==
Born in Valencia, Monzó was a Levante UD youth graduate. In 2018, he spent several months sidelined due to a knee injury, and after fully recovering, he was promoted to the reserve team ahead of the 2019–20 campaign.

On 17 January 2020, Levante announced the loan of Monzó to Tercera División side CF Intercity, but he moved on loan to Segunda División B side CF La Nucía late in the month instead. He returned to his parent club in July after making no appearances, and was again assigned to Levante's B-side.

On 21 July 2021, Monzó moved to SD Huesca and was initially assigned to the B-team in Segunda División RFEF. He made his first team debut on 29 May of the following year, coming on as a late substitute for Pablo Insua in a 0–3 Segunda División away loss against Real Valladolid.

On 4 January 2023, Monzó was loaned to Primera Federación side UD San Sebastián de los Reyes for the remainder of the season.
