= Manu Rico =

Spanish footballer

Personal information
- Full name: Manuel Rico Del Valle
- Date of birth: 11 January 2003 (age 23)
- Place of birth: Huesca, Spain
- Height: 1.74 m (5 ft 9 in)
- Position: Attacking midfielder

Team information
- Current team: Hércules

Youth career
- EF Oscense
- 2014–2021: Huesca

Senior career*
| Years | Team | Apps | (Gls) |
| 2021–2023 | Huesca B | 37 | (4) |
| 2021–2026 | Huesca | 20 | (0) |
| 2024 | → Ceuta (loan) | 6 | (0) |
| 2024–2025 | → Tarazona (loan) | 37 | (0) |
| 2026 | → Osasuna B (loan) | 17 | (0) |
| 2026– | Hércules | 0 | (0) |
- * Club domestic league appearances and goals as of 17 May 2026

Manuel "Manu" Rico Del Valle (born 11 January 2003) is a Spanish footballer who plays as an attacking midfielder for Hércules CF.

== Club career ==
Rico joined SD Huesca's youth setup at the age of 11 from EF Oscense. He first appeared with the reserves on 5 September 2021, coming on as a second-half substitute in a 1–2 Segunda División RFEF away loss against Terrassa FC.

Rico made his first-team debut 30 November 2021, replacing Dani Escriche late into a 2–0 away win over CD Cayón in the season's Copa del Rey. He made his professional debut on 14 December, as he replaced Kevin Carlos in a 0–1 home loss against Girona FC, also in the national cup.

On 30 January 2024, Rico was loaned to Primera Federación side AD Ceuta FC for the remainder of the season. On 16 August, he moved to fellow league team SD Tarazona also in a temporary deal.

On 9 July 2025, upon returning, Rico renewed his contract with Huesca for a further year. After being again rarely used, he was loaned to CA Osasuna B on 22 January 2026.

On 18 June 2026, Rico signed a permanent deal with Hércules CF also in the third division.
