= Rafa Tresaco =

Spanish footballer

Personal information
- Full name: Rafael Tresaco Blasco
- Date of birth: 24 August 2000 (age 26)
- Place of birth: Sabiñánigo, Spain
- Height: 1.84 m (6 ft 0 in)
- Position: Forward

Team information
- Current team: Huesca

Youth career
- 2010–2019: Zaragoza
- 2019: Racing Santander

Senior career*
Years	Team	Apps	(Gls)
2019–2020	Racing B	15	(4)
2019–2020	Racing Santander	8	(0)
2020–2021	Marbella	19	(5)
2021–2022	Algeciras	8	(2)
2022–2023	Huesca B	19	(6)
2023–2024	Huesca	16	(0)
2024–2025	Zamora	34	(6)
2025–2026	Cultural Leonesa	24	(2)
2026–	Huesca	0	(0)
- * Club domestic league appearances and goals as of 31 May 2026

Rafael "Rafa" Tresaco Blasco (born 24 August 2000) is a Spanish professional footballer who plays as a forward for SD Huesca.

== Club career ==
Tresaco was born in Sabiñánigo, Huesca, Aragon, and started his career at Real Zaragoza in 2010, aged ten. On 19 February 2019, after failing to agree terms on a new contract, he left the club and joined Racing de Santander.

On 10 April 2019, Tresaco was promoted to Racing's first team to cover for injured Jon Ander. He made his senior debut eleven days later, coming on as a late substitute for Alberto Noguera in a 1–1 Segunda División B home draw against SD Amorebieta.

Assigned to the reserves for the 2019–20 campaign, Tresaco made his professional debut on 4 January 2020, replacing Jon Ander late into a 0–0 away draw against CD Mirandés in the Segunda División. On 2 October, he joined Marbella FC in the third division.

On 23 June 2021, Tresaco signed for Primera División RFEF side Algeciras CF. On 31 July of the following year, he moved to another reserve team, SD Huesca B in Tercera Federación.

In August 2023, Tresaco was promoted to the main squad of the Oscenses after impressing during the pre-season. On 8 August of the following year, he joined Zamora CF in the third tier.

On 26 June 2025, Cultural y Deportiva Leonesa announced the signing of Tresaco. Roughly one year later, he returned to Huesca on a two-year deal.
