= Dani Escriche =

Spanish footballer

Personal information
- Full name: Daniel Escriche Romero
- Date of birth: 24 March 1998 (age 28)
- Place of birth: Burriana, Spain
- Height: 1.78 m (5 ft 10 in)
- Position: Forward

Team information
- Current team: Apollon Limassol
- Number: 30

Youth career
- Burriana FB
- Villarreal
- Burriana FB
- 2015–2016: Castellón
- 2016–2018: Lugo

Senior career*
Years	Team	Apps	(Gls)
2015–2016	Castellón B	?	(1)
2016	Castellón	1	(0)
2017–2018	Lugo	13	(2)
2017–2018	Polvorín	23	(11)
2018–2023	Huesca	97	(7)
2018–2019	→ Lugo (loan)	29	(3)
2020	→ Elche (loan)	20	(3)
2023	→ Albacete (loan)	12	(1)
2023–2026	Albacete	49	(5)
2024–2025	→ Cartagena (loan)	36	(0)
2026–	Apollon Limassol	20	(2)
- * Club domestic league appearances and goals as of 18 October 2026

Daniel "Dani" Escriche Romero (born 24 March 1998) is a Spanish footballer who plays for Cypriot club Apollon Limassol FC. Mainly a forward, he can also play as a winger.

== Club career ==
Born in Burriana, Castellón, Valencian Community, Escriche joined CD Castellón's youth setup in 2015 from Club Burriana FB. After being initially assigned to the Juvenil squad, he made his senior debut with the reserves in the regional leagues, scoring his first goal on 22 November of that year in a 6–1 home routing of Vinaròs CF.

Escriche made his first team debut for Castellón on 3 January 2016 with the age of 17 years and 284 days, coming on as a second-half substitute in a 3–0 Tercera División home win against CF Recambios Colón. On 9 August he signed for CD Lugo, returning to youth football.

On 27 May 2017 Escriche made his professional debut, replacing Iriome in a 0–1 away loss against SD Huesca in the Segunda División championship. On 17 December, he scored a hat-trick for the farm team in a 5–1 home routing of SD Outeiro de Rei.

Escriche scored his first professional goal on 22 April 2018, netting the opener in a 1–1 home draw against Lorca FC. On 15 July, he signed a four-year deal with La Liga side SD Huesca, being immediately loaned back to Lugo for the 2018–19 campaign.

Escriche returned to Huesca for the 2019–20 season, with the club now also in the second division. On 20 January 2020, he was loaned to Elche CF in the same category, until June. Upon returning, he was a part of the Oscenses' main squad also in La Liga, and made his debut in the category on 20 September 2020 by replacing David Ferreiro in a 0–2 home loss against Cádiz CF.

Escriche scored his first goal in the main category of Spanish football on 21 February 2021, netting the equalizer in a 3–2 home success over Granada CF. He featured in 23 league matches during the campaign, as the club suffered relegation.

On 30 January 2023, Escriche was loaned to second division side Albacete Balompié, until the end of the season. On 26 August, he signed a permanent three-year contract with the club.

On 14 August 2024, Escriche was loaned to fellow second division side FC Cartagena for the entire 2024–25 campaign. Back to Alba in July 2025, he was mainly a backup option before terminating his link with the club on 31 January 2026, and moved abroad with Cypriot side Apollon Limassol FC just hours later.

== Career statistics ==
As of match played 18 October 2026

Club	Season	League			Cup (Note: Includes Copa del Rey, Cypriot Cup)		Continental		Other		Total	
Club	Season	Division	Apps	Goals	Apps	Goals	Apps	Goals	Apps	Goals	Apps	Goals
Lugo	2017–18	Segunda División	12	2	1	0	—		—		13	2
Lugo (loan)	2018–19	Segunda División	29	3	4	1	—		—		33	4
Huesca	2019–20	Segunda División	15	0	2	0	—		—		17	0
Huesca	2020–21	La Liga	23	1	2	0	—		—		25	1
Huesca	2021–22	Segunda División	37	5	2	0	—		—		39	5
Huesca	2022–23	Segunda División	20	1	1	1	—		—		21	2
Huesca	2023–24	Segunda División	2	0	0	0	—		—		2	0
Huesca	Total		97	7	7	1	—		—		104	8
Elche (loan)	2019–20	Segunda División	20	3	0	0	—		—		20	3
Albacete (loan)	2022–23	Segunda División	14	1	0	0	—		—		14	1
Albacete	2023–24	Segunda División	33	3	1	0	—		—		34	3
Albacete	2025–26	Segunda División	18	2	3	0	—		—		21	2
Albacete	Total		51	5	4	0	—		—		55	5
Cartagena (loan)	2024–25	Segunda División	36	0	1	0	—		—		37	0
Apollon Limassol	2025–26	Cypriot First Division	14	1	4	0	—		—		18	1
Apollon Limassol	2026–27	Cypriot First Division	6	1	0	0	4	1	—		10	2
Apollon Limassol	Total		20	2	4	0	4	1	0	0	28	3
Career total			279	23	21	2	4	1	0	0	304	26
