= Darío Poveda =

Spanish footballer (born 1997)

Personal information
- Full name: Darío Poveda Romera
- Date of birth: 13 March 1997 (age 29)
- Place of birth: San Vicente del Raspeig, Spain
- Height: 1.85 m (6 ft 1 in)
- Position: Forward

Team information
- Current team: Nea Salamis Famagusta
- Number: 9

Youth career
- Jove Español
- Alicante CF
- 2008–2016: Villarreal

Senior career*
| Years | Team | Apps | (Gls) |
| 2016–2017 | Villarreal C | 34 | (15) |
| 2016–2018 | Villarreal B | 35 | (5) |
| 2017 | Villarreal | 1 | (0) |
| 2018–2019 | Atlético Madrid B | 37 | (19) |
| 2019–2021 | Atlético Madrid | 1 | (0) |
| 2020–2021 | → Getafe (loan) | 1 | (0) |
| 2021–2024 | Getafe | 15 | (1) |
| 2022 | → Huesca (loan) | 14 | (2) |
| 2022–2023 | → Ibiza (loan) | 18 | (1) |
| 2023 | → Cartagena (loan) | 15 | (3) |
| 2023–2024 | → Leganés (loan) | 7 | (0) |
| 2024 | → Cartagena (loan) | 18 | (3) |
| 2024–2026 | Farense | 42 | (5) |
| 2026– | Nea Salamis Famagusta | 3 | (2) |

International career
| 2016 | Spain U19 | 4 | (1) |
- * Club domestic league appearances and goals as of 20 September 2026

Darío Poveda Romera (born 13 March 1997) is a Spanish professional footballer who plays as a forward for Cypriot First Division club Nea Salamis Famagusta.

== Club career ==
Born in San Vicente del Raspeig, Alicante, Valencian Community, Poveda began his football career at Jove Español in his hometown as a goalkeeper, although he soon switched to playing as a striker before moving on to Alicante CF. [17] Then, he joined Villarreal CF's youth setup in 2008, aged 11. He made his senior debut with the C-team on 13 March 2016, coming on as a late substitute and scoring the last in a 5–2 home routing of UD Benigànim in the Tercera División.

On 21 August 2016, Poveda made his debut with the reserves in a 1–0 Segunda División B away loss against UE Cornellà. He was definitely promoted to the B-side the following 30 May, after scoring 14 goals for the C-team.

On 21 August 2017, Poveda made his first-team – and La Liga – debut, replacing Manu Trigueros in a 0–1 loss at Levante UD. The following 23 July, he moved to another reserve team, Atlético Madrid B also in the third division.

Poveda made his first-team debut for Atleti on 23 November 2019, playing the last eight minutes of a 1–1 away draw against Granada CF. On 31 August of the following year, he moved to fellow top tier side Getafe CF on a season-long loan deal.

In June 2021, despite only playing five minutes for Getafe, Poveda signed a permanent five-year contract with the club. He scored his first goal in the top tier on 19 December, netting a last-minute winner in a 1–0 home success over CA Osasuna.

On 25 January 2022, Poveda was loaned to Segunda División side SD Huesca until the end of the campaign. On 5 July, he moved to fellow league team UD Ibiza also in a temporary deal.

On 19 January 2023, Poveda's loan with Ibiza was terminated, and he moved to fellow second division side FC Cartagena on loan for the remainder of the season. On 3 July, he was loaned to CD Leganés in the same category for one year, but after being rarely used, he returned to the Efesé on 1 February 2024, again in a temporary deal.

On 1 July 2024, Poveda terminated his contract with Geta.

On 4 July 2024, Poveda signed with Farense in Portugal.

On 13 July 2026, Poveda moved to Cyprus and signed a two-season contract with Nea Salamis Famagusta.

== Career statistics ==
=== Club ===
As of match played 21 March 2021

Appearances and goals by club, season and competition
| Club | Season | League | | | National cup | | Continental | | Other | | Total | |
| Club | Season | Division | Apps | Goals | Apps | Goals | Apps | Goals | Apps | Goals | Apps | Goals |
|---|---|---|---|---|---|---|---|---|---|---|---|---|
| Villarreal C | 2015–16 | Tercera División | 2 | 1 | — | | — | | — | | 2 | 1 |
| Villarreal C | 2016–17 | Tercera División | 32 | 14 | — | | — | | — | | 32 | 14 |
| Villarreal C | Total | | 34 | 15 | 0 | 0 | 0 | 0 | 0 | 0 | 34 | 15 |
| Villarreal B | 2016–17 | Segunda División B | 2 | 0 | — | | — | | — | | 2 | 0 |
| Villarreal B | 2017–18 | Segunda División B | 33 | 5 | — | | — | | 4 (Note: Appearance(s) in Promotion Playoffs) | 0 | 37 | 5 |
| Villarreal B | Total | | 35 | 5 | 0 | 0 | 0 | 0 | 4 | 0 | 39 | 5 |
| Villarreal | 2016–17 | La Liga | 0 | 0 | 0 | 0 | — | | — | | 0 | 0 |
| Villarreal | 2017–18 | La Liga | 1 | 0 | 0 | 0 | 1 (Note: Appearance(s) in UEFA Europa League) | 0 | — | | 2 | 0 |
| Villarreal | Total | | 1 | 0 | 0 | 0 | 1 | 0 | 0 | 0 | 2 | 0 |
| Atlético Madrid B | 2018–19 | Segunda División B | 27 | 9 | — | | — | | 2 | 0 | 29 | 9 |
| Atlético Madrid B | 2019–20 | Segunda División B | 10 | 10 | — | | — | | — | | 10 | 10 |
| Atlético Madrid B | Total | | 37 | 19 | 0 | 0 | 0 | 0 | 2 | 0 | 39 | 19 |
| Atlético Madrid | 2019–20 | La Liga | 1 | 0 | 0 | 0 | — | | — | | 1 | 0 |
| Getafe (loan) | 2020–21 | La Liga | 1 | 0 | 0 | 0 | — | | — | | 1 | 0 |
| Career total | | | 75 | 25 | 0 | 0 | 1 | 0 | 6 | 0 | 82 | 25 |
